= Boxing at the 2011 Commonwealth Youth Games =

Boxing at the IV Commonwealth Youth Games
- Host city: Isle of Man
- Dates: September
- Main venue: Royal Hall, Villa Marina, Douglas

Boxing will be competed as one of the seven sports at the 2011 Commonwealth Youth Games in the Isle of Man from September 8 to 12, 2011, in the Royal Hall in the Villa Marina, Douglas. The event is only open to boys. In the Games, the age limit for participating athletes has been set according to the youth category of the International Boxing Association, which is 17–18 years, means athletes born in 1993 or 1994 are only eligible to take part.

== Medal summary ==
Event	Gold	Silver	Bronze
Light flyweight	Jack Bateson; England (ENG)	Kieron Smith; India (IND)	Nyiko Ndukula; South Africa (RSA)
Light flyweight	Jack Bateson; England (ENG)	Kieron Smith; India (IND)	Cornet Claudi; Mauritius (MRI)
Flyweight	Samson Sykes; England (ENG)	Jackson Woods; Australia (AUS)	Joseph Fitzpatrick; Northern Ireland (NIR)
Flyweight	Samson Sykes; England (ENG)	Jackson Woods; Australia (AUS)	Josh John; Wales (WAL)
Bantamweight	Qais Ashfaq; England (ENG)	Jessy Brown; Canada (CAN)	Obedy Mutapa; Zambia (ZAM)
Bantamweight	Qais Ashfaq; England (ENG)	Jessy Brown; Canada (CAN)	Cliff Wale; Solomon Islands (SOL)
Lightweight	Henry Thomas; England (ENG)	Charlie Flynn; Scotland (SCO)	Enda Kennedy; Northern Ireland (NIR)
Lightweight	Henry Thomas; England (ENG)	Charlie Flynn; Scotland (SCO)	Jabulani Makhense; South Africa (RSA)
Light welterweight	Daniel Lewis; Australia (AUS)	Darren Tetley; England (ENG)	Rhys Pagan; Scotland (SCO)
Light welterweight	Daniel Lewis; Australia (AUS)	Darren Tetley; England (ENG)	Mitch Buckland; Wales (WAL)
Welterweight	Damon Jones; England (ENG)	Kieran Smith; Scotland (SCO)	Botshelo Robby; Botswana (BOT)
Welterweight	Damon Jones; England (ENG)	Kieran Smith; Scotland (SCO)	Conor Doherty; Northern Ireland (NIR)
Middleweight	Dylan Hardy; Australia (AUS)	Grant Quigley; Scotland (SCO)	Surender Singh; India (IND)
Middleweight	Dylan Hardy; Australia (AUS)	Grant Quigley; Scotland (SCO)	Cody Crowley; Canada (CAN)
Light heavyweight	Brandon Allan; Australia (AUS)	Calum Evans; Wales (WAL)	Jack Massey; England (ENG)
Light heavyweight	Brandon Allan; Australia (AUS)	Calum Evans; Wales (WAL)	Heamasi Sekona; Tonga (TGA)

== Results ==
=== Light flyweight ===
Round of 16; September 8
Israel Kammwamba (MAW)
Bye
Carlos António Mandjate (MOZ)	4
Rahul Poonia (IND)	21
Brody Pigeon (CAN)
Bye
Bye
Nyiko Ndukula (RSA)
Charles Keama (PNG)
Bye
Bye
Cornet Claudi (MRI)
Shaffi Bakari (KEN)	23
Victorio Saludar (NRU)	10
Bye
(England) Jack Bateson (ENG)

Quarterfinal; September 9
Israel Kammwamba (MAW)
Rahul Poonia (IND)
Brody Pigeon (CAN)
Nyiko Ndukula (RSA)
Charles Keama (PNG)
Cornet Claudi (MRI)
Shaffi Bakari (KEN)
(England) Jack Bateson (ENG)

Semifinal; September 10
Rahul Poonia (IND)
Nyiko Ndukula (RSA)
Cornet Claudi (MRI)
(England) Jack Bateson (ENG)

Gold medal September 11
Rahul Poonia (IND)	6
(England) Jack Bateson (ENG)	13

=== Flyweight ===
Round of 16; September 8
Jackson Woods (AUS)
Bye
Sikho Nqothole (RSA)	11
Isaack Mejor (KEN)	15
(Northern Ireland) Joseph Fitzpatrick (NIR)
Bye
Bye
Dario Gabriel (SEY)
Balakrishna Vankala (IND)
Bye
Bye
(Wales) Josh John (WAL)
(England) Samson Sykes (ENG)	Knockout
Filipe Mandjate (MOZ)
Bye
Henry Umings (PNG)

Quarterfinal; September 9
Jackson Woods (AUS)
Isaack Mejor (KEN)
(Northern Ireland) Joseph Fitzpatrick (NIR)
Dario Gabriel (SEY)
Balakrishna Vankala (IND)
(Wales) Josh John (WAL)
(England) Samson Sykes (ENG)
Henry Umings (PNG)

Semifinal; September 10

Gold medal September 11

=== Bantamweight ===
Round of 16; September 8
Riyad Hossen (BAN)
Bye
Tahj Farley (BAR)	5
Obedy Mutapa (ZAM)	19
Benjamin Henry (GUY)
Bye
Bye
Jessy Brown (CAN)
Megel Drigo (DMA)
Bye
Bye
Cliff Wale (SOL)
Qais Ashfaq (ENG)	15
Dylan Cooney (AUS)	3
Bye
(Scotland) Mark McKeown (SCO)

Quarterfinal; September 9
Riyad Hossen (BAN)
Obedy Mutapa (ZAM)
Benjamin Henry (GUY)
Jessy Brown (CAN)
Megel Drigo (DMA)
Cliff Wale (SOL)
Qais Ashfaq (ENG)
(Scotland) Mark McKeown (SCO)

Semifinal; September 10
Obedy Mutapa (ZAM)	7
Jessy Brown (CAN)	19
Qais Ashfaq (ENG)

Gold medal September 11
Jessy Brown (CAN)	3
Qais Ashfaq (ENG)	15

=== Light Heavyweight ===
Quarterfinals
(Australia) Brandon Allen (AUS)
Bye
(England) Jack Massey (ENG)	15
(India) Sumit Sangwan (IND)	13
(Wales) Calum Evans (WAL)
Bye
(Tonga) Heamasi Sekona (TON)
Bye

Semifinals
(Australia) Brandon Allen (AUS)	15
(England) Jack Massey (ENG)	13
(Wales) Calum Evans (WAL)	23
(Tonga) Heamasi Sekona (TON)	14

Finals
(Australia) Brandon Allen (AUS)	26
(Wales) Calum Evans (WAL)	12
