= Canada at the 2011 Commonwealth Youth Games =

- Flag of Canada
- CG code: CAN
- CGA: Commonwealth Games Canada

in Isle of Man September 7, 2011 – September 13, 2011
- Competitors: 56 in 6 sports
- Flag bearers: Asianna Covington (opening); Caroline Morin-Houde (closing)
- Officials: 14
- Medals Ranked 15th: Gold 0 Silver 6 Bronze 10 Total 16

Commonwealth Youth Games appearances
- 2000; 2004; 2008; 2011; 2015; 2017; 2023

Canada competed at the 2011 Commonwealth Youth Games held in the British Crown Dependency of Isle of Man from September 7 to 13, 2011. Their participation marked their third Commonwealth Youth Games appearance. Canada was represented by the Commonwealth Games Canada, the association which is responsible for Commonwealth Games and Commonwealth movement in Canada. The delegation of 70 people included 56 competitors and 14 coaches and supporting staff.

Asianna Covington of Surrey, British Columbia, was given the honor to carry the national flag of Canada at the opening ceremony. Caroline Morin-Houde of Saint-Jean-sur-Richelieu, Quebec, was selected as the flag bearer in the closing ceremony. This was the first time that Canada failed to win any gold medal, and devolved to 15th position with six silvers and 16 overall medals, Canada ranking fifth in the medal table (with six golds and 26 overall medals) of the previous Commonwealth Youth Games. Sprinter Caroline Morin-Houde was the most successful competitor from Canadian side, winning three silvers. Artistic gymnast Curtis Graves was the most medal winning athlete in the Canadian delegation, winning two silvers and two bronze medals. With one silver and one bronze, Shaina Harrison and Kal Nemier were other competitors who won multiple medals at the Games.

== Medalists ==
A total of 20 out of 56 Canadian competitors won medals at the Games. The following Canadian competitors won medals at the Games. In the 'by discipline' sections below, medalists' names are emboldened.

| Medal | Name | Sport | Event | Date |
|---|---|---|---|---|
| Silver | Caroline Morin-Houde | Athletics | 100 m | September 9 |
| Silver | Caroline Morin-Houde | Athletics | 200 m | September 11 |
| Silver | Shaina Harrison; Alexa Hrycun; Caroline Morin-Houde; Marie Colombe St-Pierre | Athletics | 4×100 m relay | September 11 |
| Silver | Jessy Brown | Boxing | Bantamweight | September 11 |
| Silver | Curtis Graves | Gymnastics | Horizontal bar CIII | September 11 |
| Silver | Zachary Clay; Curtis Graves; Kal Nemier | Gymnastics | Men's team CIV | September 9 |
| Bronze | Deshaunda Morrison | Athletics | 100 m hurdles | September 10 |
| Bronze | Shaina Harrison | Athletics | 100 m | September 9 |
| Bronze | Steven Ajayi; Drelan Bramwell; Denray Jean-Jacques; Keefer Joyce | Athletics | 4×100 m relay | September 11 |
| Bronze | Taylor Farquhar | Athletics | 400 m hurdles | September 11 |
| Bronze | Vanessa McLeod | Athletics | 800 m | September 11 |
| Bronze | Cody Crowley | Boxing | Middleweight | September 10 |
| Bronze | Elliott Doyle; Simon Gauthier; Charles Matte; David Onsow | Cycling | Time trial team | September 9 |
| Bronze | Kal Nemier | Gymnastics | Horizontal bar CIII | September 11 |
| Bronze | Curtis Graves | Gymnastics | Parallel bars CIII | September 11 |
| Bronze | Curtis Graves | Gymnastics | Still rings CIII | September 11 |

Medals by discipline
| Discipline | Gold medal | Silver medal | Bronze medal | Total |
|---|---|---|---|---|
| Athletics | 0 | 3 | 5 | 8 |
| Badminton | 0 | 0 | 0 | 0 |
| Boxing | 0 | 1 | 1 | 2 |
| Cycling | 0 | 0 | 1 | 1 |
| Gymnastics | 0 | 2 | 3 | 5 |
| Rugby sevens | 0 | 0 | 0 | 0 |
| Total | 0 | 6 | 10 | 16 |

=== Multiple medalists ===
| Name | Medal | Sport | Event |
|---|---|---|---|
| Caroline Morin-Houde | Silver; Silver; Silver | Athletics | 100 m 200 m 4×100 m relay |
| Curtis Graves | Silver; Silver; Bronze; Bronze | Gymnastics | Men's team CIV; Horizontal bar CIII; Parallel bars CIII; Still rings CIII |
| Shaina Harrison | Silver; Bronze | Athletics | 4×100 m relay 100 m |
| Kal Nemier | Silver; Bronze | Gymnastics | Men's team CIV; Horizontal bar |

== Athletics ==
Athletics Canada, the national governing body of athletics in Canada, selected 21 athletes (nine men and twelve women) as a part of the delegation to participate in the athletics events. This was the second time in the history of the Games that Canada sent contingents for the athletics. Canada made its appearance in the athletics events of the Commonwealth Youth Games in 2008, where they won one gold, three silver and three bronze medals.

In the athletics team, there were nine men: Steven Ajayi (100 m), Drelan Bramwell (100– and 200 m), Jeremy Coughler (2000 m steeplechase), Christian Gravel (3000 m), Denray Jean-Jacques (400 m), Keefer Joyce (100 m), Troy Smith (1500 m), Matthew Swanson (800 m), and Jordan Wand (800 m), and twelve women: Mireille Aylwin-Descôteaux (2000 m steeplechase), Asianna Covington (discus and hammer throw), Adrianne Erdman (2000 m steeplechase), Taylor Farquhar (400 m hurdles), Emma Galbraith (800 m), Shaina Harrison (100 m), Alexa Hrycun (1500 m), Cassandra Jones (400 m), Vanessa McLeod (800 m), Caroline Morin-Houde (200 m), Brooke Rowland (javelin throw), and Marie-Colombe St-Pierre (200 m) athletes. The team was also accompanied by Christine Laverty as head coach, Jean-François Roy as team manager, and two event coaches George Kerr and Gregory Peters.

Men

| Athlete | Events | Heat | | Semifinal | | Final | |
| Athlete | Events | Result | Rank | Result | Rank | Result | Rank |
|---|---|---|---|---|---|---|---|
| Drelan Bramwell | 100 m | 10.76 | 1 Q | 10.72 | 3 Q | 10.60 | 4 |
| Drelan Bramwell | 200 m | 21.79 | 2 Q | 22.04 | 3 | did not advance | |
| Keefer Joyce | 100 m | 10.69 | 1 Q | 10.61 | 2 Q | 10.63 | 5 |
| Steven Ajayi | 200 m | 22.07 | 2 Q | 22.29 | 3 | did not advance | |
| Denray Jean-Jacques | 400 m | 49.16 | 3 Q | 50.33 | 4 | did not advance | |
| Matthew Swanson | 800 m | 1:52.74 | 2 Q | 1:52.72 | 2 Q | 1:54.09 | 4 |
| Jordan Wand | 800 m | 1:55.18 | 2 Q | 2:03.85 | 6 | did not advance | |
| Christian Gravel | 1500 m | 4:01.50 | 4 Q | N/A | | 3:58.81 | 6 |
| Troy Smith | 1500 m | 4:01.95 | 5 Q | N/A | | 4:04.09 | 8 |
| Thomas Jeremy Coughler | 2000 m steeplechase | N/A | | | | 6:14.36 | 6 |
| Steven Ajayi; Drelan Bramwell; Denray Jean-Jacques; Keefer Joyce | 4×100 m relay | N/A | | | | 41.44 | 3rd place, bronze medalist(s) |

Women

| Athlete | Events | Heat | | Semifinal | | Final | |
| Athlete | Events | Result | Rank | Result | Rank | Result | Rank |
|---|---|---|---|---|---|---|---|
| Caroline Morin-Houde | 100 m | 11.97 | 1 Q | 11.67 | 1 Q | 11.81 | 2nd place, silver medalist(s) |
| Caroline Morin-Houde | 200 m | 24.40 | 1 Q | 24.74 | 1 Q | 24.44 | 2nd place, silver medalist(s) |
| Shaina Harrison | 100 m | 12.00 | 1 Q | 11.82 | 2 Q | 11.81 | 3rd place, bronze medalist(s) |
| Marie-Colombe St-Pierre | 200 m | 24.89 | 2 Q | 25.14 | 2 Q | 25.04 | 6 |
| Cassandra Jones | 400 m | 58.15 | 2 Q | 57.56 | 3 Q | DQ | |
| Emma Galbraith | 800 m | 2:16.42 | 1 Q | N/A | | 2:16.08 | 5 |
| Vanessa McLeod | 800 m | 2:15.34 | 3 Q | N/A | | 2:13.08 | 3rd place, bronze medalist(s) |
| Alexa Hrycun | 100 m hurdles | 13.86 | 1 Q | N/A | | 13.96 | 4 |
| Deshaunda Morrison | 100 m hurdles | 13.87 | 3 Q | N/A | | 13.77 | 3rd place, bronze medalist(s) |
| Taylor Farquhar | 400 m hurdles | N/A | | | | 62.00 | 3rd place, bronze medalist(s) |
| Mireille Aylwin-Descôteaux | 2000 m steeplechase | N/A | | | | 7:17.81 | 6 |
| Adrianne Erdman | 2000 m steeplechase | N/A | | | | 7:14.58 | 5 |
| Shaina Harrison; Alexa Hrycun; Caroline Morin-Houde; Marie Colombe St-Pierre | 4×100 m relay | N/A | | | | 46.58 | 2nd place, silver medalist(s) |
| Asianna Covington | Discus throw | N/A | | | | 43.52 m | 5 |
| Asianna Covington | Hammer throw | N/A | | | | 49.94 m | 4 |

== Badminton ==
Commonwealth Games Canada sent eight—four men and four women—badminton players to the Games, competing in all the events. None of the players succeeded in winning a medal. The doubles pair of Nathan Choi and Nyl Yakura advanced to the bronze final match where they lost to Srikanth Kidambi and Hema Thandarang of India.

| Athlete | Event | Round of 64 | Round of 32 | Round of 16 | Quarterfinals | Semifinals | Final | | Ref |
| Athlete | Event | Opposition Result | Opposition Result | Opposition Result | Opposition Result | Opposition Result | Opposition Result | Rank | |
|---|---|---|---|---|---|---|---|---|---|
| Clinton Wong | Men's singles | Bye | (Scotland) Matthew Carder (SCO); W 21–15, 18–21, 21–16 | (Wales) Matthew Carder (WAL); L 22–24, 18–21 | did not advance | | | | |
| Nyl Yakura | Men's singles | Bye | Daniel Sebunnya (UGA); W 21–8, 21–8 | Pratul Joshi (IND); L 18–21, 15–21 | did not advance | | | | |
| Adrianna Giuffre | Women's singles | Bye | (Northern Ireland) Alannah Stephenson (NIR); W 21–16, 21–16 | did not advance | | | | | |
| Wan-Ting Tsai | Women's singles | Bye | Kristi Reno-Singh (TRI); W 21–6, 21–3 | Pusarla Sindhu (IND); L 15–21, 21–13, 8–21 | did not advance | | | | |
| Andrew Lau, Clinton Wong | Men's doubles | N/A | | (Trinidad and Tobago) Jason Ramjas, Matthaus Wilford (TRI); W 21–6, 21–9 | (India) Srikanth Kidambi, Hema Thandarang (IND); L 21–18, 16–21, 15–21 | did not advance | | | |
| Nathan Choi, Nyl Yakura | Men's doubles | | | (Scotland) Matthew Carder, Josh Neil (SCO); W 21–14, 21–10 | (Australia) Hu-Wen Chew, Toby Wong (AUS); W 21–9, 21–11 | (Malaysia) Nelson Heg, Ee yi Teo (IND); L 17–21, 11–21 | Bronze final (India) Srikanth Kidambi, Hema Thandarang (IND); L 14–21, 21–15, 12–21 | 4 | |
| Adrianna Giuffre, Wan-Ting Tsai | Women's doubles | N/A | | (Malaysia) Sonia Cheah, Li lian Yang (MAS); L 13–21, 18–21 | did not advance | | | | |
| Vivian Kwok, Kacey Tung | Women's doubles | N/A | | (Falkland Islands) Matthew Carder, Josh Neil (FLK); W 21–3, 21–8 | (Australia) Jacqueline Guan, Gronya Somerville (AUS); L 11–21, 12–21 | did not advance | | | |
| Kacey Tung, Clinton Wong | Mixed doubles | N/A | | (Maldives) Aminath Suhaila Hussain; Mohamed Shabin (MDV); W 21–2, 21–2 | (Wales) Daniel Font; Jordan Hart (WAL); L 21–15, 15–21, 19–21 | did not advance | | | |
| Wan-Ting Tsai, Nyl Yakura | Mixed doubles | N/A | | (South Africa) Andries Malan, Jennifer van den Berg (RSA); W 21–11, 21–10 | (Guernsey) Emily Trebert, Jordan Trebert (GGY); W 21–8, 21–10 | (Malaysia) Nelson Heg, Meng yean Lee (MAS); L 21–18, 21–17, –21, 16–21 | did not advance | | |

== Boxing ==
Canada entered four pugilists—Brody Pigeon (light flyweight), Jessy Brown (bantamweight), Luis Valdivia (welterweight) and Cody Crowley (middleweight)—to compete in the boxing events. Both Pigeon and Brown received byes in their first round matches. Pigeon eliminated in the second round (quarterfinal) after losing to Nyiko Ndukula of South Africa. Brown was the only medal winning Canadian boxer. He defeated Benjamin Henry of Guyana in the quarterfinal and Obedy Mutapa of Zambia in the semifinal. In the final bout, Brown lost to Qais Ashfaq of England by the points difference of 3 to 15, but his appearance in the final round helped him with the podium finish—a silver medal. Opponent of Valdivia, Kieran Smith, won the quarterfinal match due to walkover. Crowley defeated Tevita Pomale of Tonga in the quarterfinal, but lost to Dylan Hardy of Australia in the semifinal.

| Athlete | Event | Round of 16 | Quarterfinals | Semifinals | Final | | Ref |
| Athlete | Event | Opposition Result | Opposition Result | Opposition Result | Opposition Result | Rank | |
|---|---|---|---|---|---|---|---|
| Brody Pigeon | Light flyweight | Bye | Nyiko Ndukula (RSA); L 11–16 | did not advance | | | |
| Jessy Brown | Bantamweight | Bye | Benjamin Henry (GUY); W opponent retired injured | Obedy Mutapa (ZAM); W 19–7 | (England) Qais Ashfaq (ENG); L 3–15 | 2nd place, silver medalist(s) | |
| Luis Valdivia | Welterweight | N/A | (Scotland) Kieran Smith (SCO); L opponent won by walkover | did not advance | | | |
| Cody Crowley | Middleweight | N/A | Tevita Pomale (TGA); W 16–5 | Dylan Hardy (AUS); W 12–14 | did not advance | | |

== Cycling ==
Men

| Athlete | Event | Time | Rank | Ref |
|---|---|---|---|---|
| Elliott Doyle | Time trial | 10.02 | 15 | |
| Elliott Doyle | Road race | @1Lap | 22 | |
| Elliott Doyle | Criterium | @34Laps | 27 | |
| Simon-Pierre Gauthier | Time trial | 9.44 | 9 | |
| Simon-Pierre Gauthier | Road race | 2:37:24 | 15 | |
| Simon-Pierre Gauthier | Criterium | 57.48 | 8 | |
| Charles Matte | Time trial | 9.43 | 8 | |
| Charles Matte | Road race | 2:36:22 | 7 | |
| Charles Matte | Criterium | @34Laps | 26 | |
| David Onsow | Time trial | 10.37 | 27 | |
| David Onsow | Road race | @2Laps | 24 | |
| David Onsow | Criterium | @35Laps | 28 | |
| Elliott Doyle, Simon-Pierre Gauthier, Charles Matte, David Onsow | Time trial team | 19.27 | 3rd place, bronze medalist(s) | |
| Elliott Doyle, Simon-Pierre Gauthier, Charles Matte, David Onsow | Road race team | — | 6 | |

Women

| Athlete | Event | Time | Rank | Ref |
|---|---|---|---|---|
| Allyson Gillard | Time trial | 11:44 | 12 | |
| Allyson Gillard | Road race | 1:14:52 | 15 | |
| Allyson Gillard | Criterium | @3Laps | 15 | |
| Tennessee Mayer | Time trial | 11:45 | 13 | |
| Tennessee Mayer | Road race | 1:16:01 | 16 | |
| Tennessee Mayer | Criterium | @2Laps | 13 | |
| Janie Rioux-Coulombe | Time trial | 11:50 | 15 | |
| Janie Rioux-Coulombe | Road race | 1:08:11 | 11 | |
| Janie Rioux-Coulombe | Criterium | @2Laps | 12 | |
| Allyson Gillard, Tennessee Mayer, Janie Rioux-Coulombe | Time trial team | 23.29 | 5 | |
| Allyson Gillard, Tennessee Mayer, Janie Rioux-Coulombe | Road race team | — | 6 | |

== Gymnastics ==
Artistic
Men

| Athlete | Event | Apparatus | | | | | | Final | |
| Athlete | Event | Floor | Pommel horse | Rings | Vault | Parallel bars | Horizontal bar | Total | Rank |
|---|---|---|---|---|---|---|---|---|---|
| Zachary Clay | Qualification | 13.400 Q | 13.050 Q | 10.450 | 14.650 Q | 13.600 Q | 12.950 | 78.100 | 3 Q |
| Zachary Clay | All-around | 13.650 | 12.600 | 11.650 | 14.850 | 13.500 | 10.800 | 77.050 | 7 |
| Zachary Clay | Floor | 13.300 | N/A | | | | | 13.300 | 4 |
| Zachary Clay | Pommel horse | N/A | 12.950 | N/A | | | | 12.950 | 4 |
| Zachary Clay | Vault | N/A | | | 14.175 | N/A | | 14.175 | 5 |
| Zachary Clay | Parallel bars | N/A | | | | 12.850 | N/A | 12.850 | 4 |
| Kal Nemier | Qualification | 12.650 | 10.350 | 13.050 Q | 14.500 | 13.000 | 13.450 Q | 77.000 | 5 Q |
| Kal Nemier | All-around | 13.100 | 10.700 | 13.450 | 14.900 | 12.900 | 13.550 | 78.600 | 5 |
| Kal Nemier | Rings | N/A | | 12.850 | N/A | | | 12.850 | 5 |
| Kal Nemier | Horizontal bar | N/A | | | | | 13.600 | 13.600 | 3rd place, bronze medalist(s) |
| Curtis Grave | Qualification | 12.050 | 8.500 | 12.550 Q | 14.100 | 13.400 Q | 13.450 Q | 74.050 | 11 |
| Curtis Grave | Rings | N/A | | 13.400 | N/A | | | 13.400 | 3rd place, bronze medalist(s) |
| Curtis Grave | Parallel bars | N/A | | | | 13.250 | N/A | 13.250 | 3rd place, bronze medalist(s) |
| Curtis Grave | Horizontal bar | N/A | | | | | 13.750 | 13.750 | 2nd place, silver medalist(s) |

== Rugby sevens ==
Canadian roster for the 2011 Commonwealth Youth Games consisted of 12 players. Players were selected evenly from British Columbia and Ontario only. Shane Thompson, head coach of the Canadian National Under-18 Men's Sevens team, joined the team as coach, Jeff Williams as assistant coach and Darrell Devine as co-coach/manager.

Team Roster

- Lukas Balkovec
- Justin Douglas
- Fergus Hall
- Conor McCann
- Andrew Battaglia
- Haydn Evans
- Lucas Hammond
- Jorden Sandover-Best
- Byron Boville
- Scott Gauer
- Patrick Kay
- Nathan Yanagiya

Pool A

| Team | Pld | W | D | L | PF | PA | PD | Pts |
|---|---|---|---|---|---|---|---|---|
| Australia | 3 | 3 | 0 | 0 | 97 | 5 | +92 | 9 |
| Scotland | 3 | 2 | 0 | 1 | 63 | 38 | +25 | 7 |
| Canada | 3 | 1 | 0 | 2 | 65 | 46 | +19 | 5 |
| Isle of Man | 3 | 0 | 0 | 3 | 5 | 140 | −135 | 3 |

10 September 2011
16:41

| Australia | 31–0 | Canada |
| | Report |

The Bowl Stadium, Douglas

10 September 2011
17:58

| Scotland | 15–14 | Canada |
| | Report |

The Bowl Stadium, Douglas

10 September 2011
19:36

| Canada | 50–0 | Isle of Man |
| | Report |

The Bowl Stadium, Douglas

Quarterfinals

Canadian team qualified for the quarterfinal after finishing third in the pool A. On 11 September, team Canada played its quarterfinal match against the runner-up of pool B South Africa. South African team won the match with a goal difference of 24–12, and qualified for the semifinals.

11 September 2011
16:53

| Canada | 12–24 | South Africa |
| | Report |

The Bowl Stadium, Douglas

Semi-final plate and bowl

After losing to South African team in the quarterfinal, Canadian team played against Trinidad and Tobago to qualify for the Grand Final Plate match. Canada beat Trinidad and Tobago with a goal difference of 60–7, largest margin victory of Canada in the tournament.

11 September 2011
17:49

| Trinidad and Tobago | 7–60 | Canada |
| | Report |

The Bowl Stadium, Douglas

Grand Final Plate

Canada faced Isle of Man in the Grand Final Plate match. Isle of Man earned a place after beating Sri Lanka in the other semi Final Plate match. Similar to pool round match, Isle of Man remained scoreless and Canadian team with a goal difference of 52–0 won Grand Final Plate—equivalent to fifth position in the final standings.

11 September 2011
19:34

| Isle of Man | 0–52 | Canada |
| | Report |

The Bowl Stadium, Douglas

== See also ==
- 2011 Commonwealth Youth Games medal table
- Canada at the 2010 Summer Youth Olympics
