= Barbados at the 2011 Commonwealth Youth Games =

- CGF code: BAR
- CGA: Barbados Olympic Association

in Isle of Man
- Competitors: 13 in 5 sports
- Medals Ranked 22nd: Gold 0 Silver 0 Bronze 1 Total 1

Commonwealth Youth Games appearances
- 2000; 2004; 2008; 2011; 2015; 2017; 2023

Barbados competed in the 2011 Commonwealth Youth Games (officially known as the IV Commonwealth Youth Games) held in the British Crown Dependency of Isle of Man from September 7 to 13, 2011. The nation was represented by the Barbados Olympic Association, which is responsible for the Commonwealth Games and Commonwealth Youth Games in Barbados.

Barbados sent a delegation of 13 athletes, who participated in five different sports—athletics, badminton, boxing, cycling, and swimming. Barbados earned only one bronze medal in the Games, won by Kion Joseph in 400 m hurdles event of athletics. Barbados ranked 22nd and finished last in the medal table of the Games, a position shared with nine other Commonwealth Games Associations.

== Background ==
Barbados is participating in the Commonwealth Games since their first appearance at the 1954 British Empire and Commonwealth Games held in Vancouver, in the province of British Columbia in Canada.^{[a]} The Barbados Olympic Association, the country's National Olympic Committee, is responsible for the Commonwealth and Commonwealth Youth Games in Barbados. Barbados participated in the inaugural Games hosted by the Scottish city of Edinburgh in 2000. Barbados did not send its delegation for the 2004 Commonwealth Youth Games held in Bendigo, Australia. At the previous edition of the Games in Pune, the country had a delegation of ten athletes (six men and four women). Barbados succeeded in winning a gold in athletics, which came from 100 m hurdles women event. With this gold medal, Barbados finished at 17th position in the final medal standings, the position it shared with Grenada and Guernsey.

== Athletics ==
Three athletes participated for Barbados in athletics. Jerrad Mason competed in 800 m, he took a time of 2:08.01 in his heat and qualified for the semifinal. In the semifinal, Mason was eliminated from the competition after finishing sixth. Kion Joseph ranked first in his heat of 400 m with a time of 54.56. He earned a bronze medal for his nation after taking a time of 53.52 in the final. The sole female athlete to represent Barbados in athletics was Sonia Gaskin, who failed to get through her heat round. Gaskin took a time of 2:19.10 and finished third in her heat.

Men

Athlete	Events	Heat		Semifinal		Final	
Athlete	Events	Result	Rank	Result	Rank	Result	Rank
Jerrad Mason	800 m	2:08.01 Q	2	2:06.03	6	Did Not Advance	
Kion Joseph	400 m hurdles	54.56 Q	1	NA		53.52	Bronze medal

Women

Athlete	Events	Heat		Semifinal		Final	
Athlete	Events	Result	Rank	Result	Rank	Result	Rank
Sonia Gaskin	800 m	2:19.10	3	Did Not Advance			

== Badminton ==
Two Barbadian athletes, Jevon Gaskin and Monyata Riviera, participated in badminton. Both the players received a bye in their first round matches of singles. None of the players advanced past the first round. Gaskin lost to Reneshan Naidoo of South Africa by a points difference of 4–21, 11–21. Riviera lost to Welsh Jordan Hart by a points difference of 7–21, 3–21. Gaskin and Riviera paired up for mixed doubles; they succeeded against a Kiribati pair of Mikaere Ramuz and Teitiria Utimawa. The pair lost to Nelson Heg and Meng yean Lee of Malaysia in the second round by a points difference of 5–21, 13–21.

Athlete	Event	Round of 64	Round of 32	Round of 16	Quarterfinals	Semifinals	Final	
Athlete	Event	Opposition Result	Opposition Result	Opposition Result	Opposition Result	Opposition Result	Opposition Result	Rank
Jevon Gaskin	Men's singles	Bye	Reneshan Naidoo (RSA); L 4–21, 11–21	did not advance				
Monyata Riviera	Women's singles	Bye	(Wales) Jordan Hart (WAL); L 7–21, 3–21	did not advance				
Jevon Gaskin; Monyata Riviera	Mixed doubles	N/A	(Kiribati) Mikaere Ramuz, Teitiria Utimawa (KIR); W 21–11, 21–10	(Malaysia) Nelson Heg, Meng yean Lee (MAL); L 5–21, 13–21	did not advance			

== Boxing ==
Two pugilists—Tahj Farley and Leonard Harewood—competed for Barbados in boxing in the bantamweight and middleweight classes, respectively. Both the players were eliminated after losing their first round matches. Farley lost to Obedy Mutapa of Zambia by a points difference of 5–19. Dylan Hardy of Australia defeated Harewood by a points difference of 19 to 10.

Athlete	Event	Round of 16	Quarterfinals	Semifinals	Final	
Athlete	Event	Opposition Result	Opposition Result	Opposition Result	Opposition Result	Rank
Tahj Farley	Bantamweight	Obedy Mutapa (ZAM); L 5–19	did not advance			
Leonard Harewood	Middleweight	N/A	Dylan Hardy (AUS); L 10–19	did not advance		

== Cycling ==
Two cyclists represented Barbados. Both Russell Elcock and Brandon Wilkie competed in the same three events (time trial, road race and criterium). They also participated in team time trial event and finished in 10th position.

Men

Athlete	Event	Time/Laps	Rank
Russell Elcock	Time trial	10:05	17
Russell Elcock	Road race	4 laps	30
Russell Elcock	Criterium	36 laps	30
Brandon Wilkie	Time trial	10.45	32
Brandon Wilkie	Road race	7 laps	40
Brandon Wilkie	Criterium	39 laps	36
Team Barbados	Team time trial	20.50	10

== Swimming ==
Barbados entered four swimmers—one man and three women. Zabrina Holder was the most successful female swimmer from Barbadian side. She was the only Barbadian female swimmer who advanced beyond the preliminary round and competed in the final, finishing sixth in the 100 m butterfly event. Amara Gibbs reached the final of 200 m butterfly, but did not start her event. Another woman swimmer, Lee-Ann Rose, failed to advance to the finals of any of her events. Matthew Courtis was the only male swimmer from Barbados; he participated in six different events. His best performances came from 400 m individual medley and 200 m backstroke, ranking fifth and seventh in the finals of the respective events.

Men

Athlete	Events	Heat		Final	
Athlete	Events	Time	Rank	Time	Rank
Matthew Courtis	400 m Individual Medley	N/A		4:42.22	5
Matthew Courtis	200 m Backstroke	2:13.78	11	Did Not Advance	
Matthew Courtis	1500 m Freestyle	16:34.75	10	Did Not Advance	
Matthew Courtis	200 m Individual Medley	2:15.22	9	Did Not Advance	
Matthew Courtis	400 m Freestyle	4:14.79	11	Did Not Advance	
Matthew Courtis	200 m Butterfly	2:15.76	11Q	2:14.15	7

Women

Athlete	Events	Heat		Final	
Athlete	Events	Time	Rank	Time	Rank
Zabrina Holder	50 m Butterfly	29.07	9	Did Not Advance	
Zabrina Holder	200 m Individual Medley	2:25.12	14	Did Not Advance	
Zabrina Holder	100 m Butterfly	1:02.65	5Q	1:02.51	6
Amara Gibbs	200 m Backstroke	2:25.05	12	Did Not Advance	
Amara Gibbs	200 m Butterfly	2:24.27	9Q	DNS	
Amara Gibbs	400 m Individual Medley	5:08.89	13	Did Not Advance	
Lee-Ann Rose	200 m Backstroke	2:22.88	10	Did Not Advance	
Lee-Ann Rose	100 m Backstroke	1:07.24	11	Did Not Advance	
Lee-Ann Rose	50 m Backstroke	31.45	11	Did Not Advance	

== Notes and references ==
Notes

- ^{a} The Commonwealth Games were initially known as the British Empire Games and were renamed to the British Empire and Commonwealth Games in 1954 and the British Commonwealth Games in 1970, before finally gaining their current title for the 1978 edition.
