= India at the 2011 Commonwealth Youth Games =

- CGF code: IND
- CGA: Indian Olympic Association

in Isle of Man
- Competitors: 20 (twelve men and eight women) in 4 sports
- Officials: 11
- Medals Ranked 9th: Gold 4 Silver 4 Bronze 3 Total 11

Commonwealth Youth Games appearances
- 2000; 2004; 2008; 2011; 2015; 2017; 2023

India competed at the 2011 Commonwealth Youth Games (officially known as the IV Commonwealth Youth Games) held in the Isle of Man from 7 to 13 September 2011. India has participated in all the editions of the Commonwealth Youth Games. The nation was represented by the Indian Olympic Association, which is responsible for the Commonwealth Games and Commonwealth Youth Games in India.

The delegation of India consisted of 20 competitors, participating in four—athletics, badminton, boxing and cycling—out of the seven sports of the programme, and 11 officials. Durgesh Kumar, Navjetdeep Singh and Pusarla Sindhu won gold medals for India in 400 m hurdles, shot put, and women's singles event of badminton, respectively. Badminton player Srikanth Kidambi became the only Indian athlete to win multiple medals, including a silver in mixed doubles (paired with Maneesha Kukkapalli) and a bronze in men's doubles (paired with Hema Thandarang). India devolved from the top position in the previous Games to the ninth position with total of nine medals (equally distributed in all medal categories).

== Background ==
India has participated in the Commonwealth Games since their second revision in 1934 (the then-British Empire Games), held in London, England. The Indian Olympic Association, the country's National Olympic Committee, is responsible for the Commonwealth and Commonwealth Youth Games in India. The nation has sent its delegation to all the editions of the Commonwealth Youth Games. India has hosted the Commonwealth and Commonwealth Youth Games in 2010 and 2008 in New Delhi and Pune, respectively. In the 2008 Commonwealth Youth Games, India won the most gold (33), silver (26) and total medals, and finished first in the final medal table standings. In the 2011 Commonwealth Youth Games, Indian Olympic Association sent a delegation consisted of twenty athletes (twelve men and eight women) and eleven officials (including coaches and supporting staff).

== Medalists ==
Indian athletes won a total of nine medals at the Games, equally distributed among all categories of medals. India devolved to ninth position in the final medal table standings, behind Malaysia; India was ranked first in the medal table of the previous Commonwealth Youth Games, with total 76 medals.

Pusarla Venkata Sindhu, supported by the Olympic Gold Quest, won a gold for India in the women's singles event of badminton. The other two gold medals came from Durgesh Kumar and Navjetdeep Singh, who finished on the top of the podium of 400 m hurdles and shot put, respectively. Badminton player Srikanth Kidambi was the only multiple medal winning Indian athlete at the Games, winning a silver in mixed doubles and a bronze in men's doubles. Two pugilists, Rahul Poonia and Surender Singh, won medals in their respective weight categories. Poonia won silver in light flyweight and Singh won bronze in middleweight.

Medal	Name	Sport	Event	Date
Gold	Durgesh Kumar	Athletics	Men's 400 m hurdles	11 September
Gold	Pusarla Sindhu	Badminton	Women's singles	11 September
Gold	Navjetdeep Singh	Athletics	Men's shot put	11 September
Silver	Sameer Verma	Badminton	Men's singles	11 September
Silver	Maneesha Kukkapalli, Srikanth Kidambi	Badminton	Mixed doubles	11 September
Silver	Rahul Poonia	Boxing	Light flyweight	11 September
Bronze	Navjeet Kaur Dhillon	Athletics	Women's shot put	9 September
Bronze	Surender Singh	Boxing	Middleweight	10 September
Bronze	Srikanth Kidambi, Hema Thandarang	Badminton	Men's doubles	11 September

== Athletics ==
Navjeet Kaur Dhillon was one of seven athletes to participate in the women's discus throw event. With a throw of 45.27 m, Dhillon won a bronze medal. Durgesh Kumar completed his heat of 400 m hurdles with a time of 53.15 and qualified for final. He won a gold in the final after finishing race with a time of 51.76. Another medallist from the Indian side was Navjetdeep Singh, who won a gold medal in shot put event with a throw of 18.81 m.

Women

Athlete	Events	Heat		Semifinal		Final	
Athlete	Events	Result	Rank	Result	Rank	Result	Rank
Sunanda Sarkar	100 m sprint	12.41	3 Q	12.10	4 Q	12.32	6
Sunanda Sarkar	200 m sprint	24.97	3 Q	25.20	6	did not advance	
Archana Suseentran	200 m sprint	24.59	1 Q	25.36	3	did not advance	
Priyanka Mondal	400 m	Disqualified					
Navjeet Kaur Dhillon	Discus throw	N/A				45.27 m	Bronze medal

Men

Athlete	Events	Heat		Semifinal		Final	
Athlete	Events	Result	Rank	Result	Rank	Result	Rank
Durgesh Kumar	400 m hurdles	53.15	1 Q	N/A		51.76	Gold medal
Sachin	Discus throw	N/A				55.43 m	5
Navjetdeep Singh	Shot put	N/A				18.81 m	Gold medal

== Badminton ==
Seven Indian badminton players went to the Games, competing in all five badminton events. Malaysia dominated in the sport, winning all but one of the five gold medals, the only other gold was won by Pusarla Sindhu in women's singles. Sindhu defeated Malaysian Sonia Cheah in the final match by 22–20, 21–8. Sameer Verma won silver after losing to Zulfadli Zulkiffli of Malaysia by 16–21, 21–17, 15–21 in the final of men's singles. In men's doubles, the pair Srikanth Kidambi/Hema Thandarang won a bronze after defeating Canadian pair Nathan Choi/Nyl Yakura. Kidambi, pairing with Maneesha Kukkapalli, also won silver in mixed doubles event.

Athlete	Event	Round of 64	Round of 32	Round of 16	Quarterfinals	Semifinals	Final	
Athlete	Event	Opposition Result	Opposition Result	Opposition Result	Opposition Result	Opposition Result	Opposition Result	Rank
Pratul Joshi	Men's singles	Bye	(Falkland Islands) Dominic Jaffray (FLK); W 21–5, 21–7	Nyl Yakura (CAN); W 21–18, 21–15	Zulfadli Zulkiffli (MAS); L 13–21, 21–19, 19–21	did not advance		
Sameer Verma	Men's singles	Bye	Andries Malan (RSA); W 21–6, 21–9	Ezra Mulenga (ZAM); W 21–4, 21–4	Joo Ven Soong (MAS); W 21–12, 21–15	(England) Tom Wolfenden (ENG); W 21–9, 21–15	Zulfadli Zulkiffli (MAS); L 16–21, 21–17, 15–21	Silver medal
Pusarla Sindhu	Women's singles	Bye	(Isle of Man) Dominic Jaffray;(IMN); W 21–2, 21–3	Wan-Ting Tsai (CAN); W 15–21, 21–13, 21–8	Tara Pilven (AUS); W 21–5, 21–5	Li lian Yang (MAS); W 21–12, 21–10	Sonia Cheah (MAS); W 22–20, 21–8	Gold medal
Saili Rane	Women's singles	Bye	Stella Knekna (CYP); W 21–15, 21–14	Sonia Cheah (MAS); L 7–21, 10–21	did not advance			
Srikanth Kidambi, Hema Thandarang	Men's doubles	N/A		(Australia) Matthew Chau, Eddie Hung (AUS); W 21–13, 21–13	(Canada) Andrew Lau, Clinton Wong (CAN); W 18–21, 21–16, 21–15	(England) Ryan McCarthy, Tom Wolfenden (ENG); L 21–8, 14–21, 20–22	Bronze final (Canada) Nathan Choi, Nyl Yakura (CAN); W 21–14, 15–21, 21–12	Bronze medal
Maneesha Kukkapalli, Pusarla Sindhu	Women's doubles	N/A		(Kenya) Naylee Nagada, Ashni Shah (KEN); W 21–7, 21–6	(Malaysia) Andrew Lau, Clinton Wong (MAS); L 19–21, 19–21	did not advance		
Saili Rane, Hema Thandarang	Mixed doubles	N/A	Bye	(Australia) Jacqueline Guan, Toby Wong (AUS); W 21–18, 21–10	(Malaysia) Mei kuan Chow, Ee yi Teo (MAS); L 13–21, 15–21	did not advance		
Maneesha Kukkapalli, Srikanth Kidambi	Mixed doubles	N/A	(Falkland Islands) Sofia Arkhipkina, Jordan Phillips (FLK); W 21–4, 21–7	(England) Holly Smith, Rhys Walker (ENG); W 21–13, 21–19	(Scotland) Kirsty Gilmour, Matthew Carder (SCO); W 21–10, 21–10	(Malaysia) Nelson Heg, Meng yean Lee (MAS); W 21–18, 21–19	(Malaysia) Mei kuan Chow, Ee yi Teo (MAS); L 21–18, 16–21, 8–21	Silver medal

== Boxing ==
Indian Boxing Federation selected four boxers to represent India in the Games. The boxing delegation was also accompanied by two coaches. Rahul Poonia (light flyweight) and Surender Singh (middle weight) won medals for India. Poonia, winning all his preliminary bouts by large margins, lost to Jack Bateson of England with a point difference of 6–13 in the final bout, and won a silver medal. In Singh's middleweight event, only eight pugilists competed, making first round a quarterfinal match. Singh defeated Nathan Thorley of Wales in his first bout. In the semifinal match, Singh lost to Scottish boxer Grant Quigley, but his semifinal appearance guaranteed him a bronze medal, which he shared with Cody Crowley of Canada.

Athlete	Event	Round of 16	Quarterfinals	Semifinals	Final	
Athlete	Event	Opposition Result	Opposition Result	Opposition Result	Opposition Result	Rank
Rahul Poonia	Light Flyweight	Carlos Mandjate (MOZ); W 21–4	Israel Kammwamba (MAW); W (RSCI)	Nyiko Ndukula (RSA); W 26–8	(England) Jack Bateson (ENG); L 6–13	Silver medal
Balakrishna Vankala	Flyweight	Bye	(Wales) Josh John (WAL); L 12–14	did not advance		
Surender Singh	Middleweight	N/A	(Wales) Nathan Thorley (WAL); W 21–15	(Scotland) Grant Quigley (SCO); L 24–15	did not advance	Bronze medal
Sumit Sangwan	Light heavyweight	(England) Jack Massey (ENG); L 13–15	did not advance			

== Cycling ==
Two entrants competed for India in the cycling events: Abhinandan Bhosale and Anjitha Parambil. Bhosale was ranked 37 in his time trial event and drove 11.24. Parambil did not finish her time trial event. She was expected to participate in the road race, but she did not start the event.

Men

Athlete	Event	Time	Rank
Abhinandan Bhosale	Time trial	11.24	37

Women

Athlete	Event	Time	Rank
Anjitha Parambil	Time trial	DNF	
Anjitha Parambil	Road race	DNS	

== See also ==
- India at the 2010 Summer Youth Olympics
- India at the 2010 Commonwealth Games
