= Zambia at the 2011 Commonwealth Youth Games =

- CGF code: ZAM
- CGA: National Olympic Committee of Zambia

in Isle of Man
- Competitors: Five in Four sports
- Officials: Two
- Medals Ranked 22nd: Gold 0 Silver 0 Bronze 1 Total 1

Commonwealth Youth Games appearances
- 2000; 2004; 2008; 2011; 2015; 2017; 2023

Zambia competed in the 2011 Commonwealth Youth Games held in the British Crown Dependency of Isle of Man from 7 to 13 September 2011. National Olympic Committee of Zambia sent a delegation of eight people included six competitors – all men – and two officials. The Zambian delegation was economically supported by the Commonwealth Games Federation. Zambia won only one bronze medal and finished last in the medal table, with 10 other Commonwealth Games Associations.

== Delegation ==
National Olympic Committee of Zambia selected eight members as an official delegation of nation in the 2011 Commonwealth Youth Games. It consisted five competitors, including two pugilists (Obed Mutapa and Charles Lumbwe), two swimmers (Chishala Mukuka and Ralph Goveia) middle distance runner Harry Mulenga and Chongo Mulenga, who participated in badminton. Delegation was also accompanied by the boxing coach Musonda Chinungu and swimming coach Chisela Kanchela.

The Commonwealth Games Federation supported the National Olympic Committee of Zambia to send its delegation for the Games as a part of its sports development program.

So, hopefully we can see the graduation of these juniors to be able to participate at the next Commonwealth Games. As you know the Commonwealth has started a development programme equivalent to the junior Olympics.

—Hazel Kennedy, General Secretary of the National Olympic Committee of Zambia

== Athletics ==
Athlete	Event	Final	
Athlete	Event	Result	Rank
Harry Mulenga	3000 m	8:29.98	4

== Badminton ==
Athlete	Event	Round of 64	Round of 32	Round of 16	Quarterfinals	Semifinals	Final	
Athlete	Event	Opposition Result	Opposition Result	Opposition Result	Opposition Result	Opposition Result	Opposition Result	Rank
Chongo Mulenga	Men's singles	Bye	(Falkland Islands) Jordan Phillips (FLK); W 21–9, 21–11	Sameer Verma (IND); L 4–21, 4–21	did not advance			

== Boxing ==
Athlete	Event	Round of 16	Quarterfinals	Semifinals	Final	
Athlete	Event	Opposition Result	Opposition Result	Opposition Result	Opposition Result	Rank
Surender Singh	Bantamweight	Tahj Farley (BAR); W 19–5	Riyad Hossen (BAN); W 15–5	Jessy Brown (CAN); L 7–19	did not advance	Bronze medal
Charles Lumbwe	Lightweight	Denis Okoth (KEN); W 15–12	(Scotland) Charlie Flynn (SCO); L 6–22	did not advance		
