= Tonga at the 2011 Commonwealth Youth Games =

- CGF code: TON
- CGA: Tonga Association of Sports and National Olympic Committee

in Isle of Man
- Competitors: 4 in 3 sports
- Officials: 3
- Medals Ranked 22nd: Gold 0 Silver 0 Bronze 1 Total 1

Commonwealth Youth Games appearances
- 2000; 2004; 2008; 2011; 2015; 2017; 2023

Tonga competed in the 2011 Commonwealth Youth Games held in the British Crown Dependency of Isle of Man from 7 to 13 September 2011. Their participation marked their second Commonwealth Youth Games appearance. The delegation of Tonga consisted of three officials and four competitors (two men and two women) participating in three different sports— athletics, boxing and swimming. This was a decrease in the number of athletes from the nation's last appearance at the Games, when nine athletes were sent to the 2008 Commonwealth Youth Games in Pune. Heamasi Sekona won a bronze in the light heavyweight class of boxing without winning a single bout. Sekona was the only medalist from Tongan side. None of the rest three athletes advanced past the qualifying stages, and thus did not win any medals. Katiloka ranked eighth overall in the qualifying round for triple jump; middleweight boxer, Pomale, lost to Cody Crowley of Canada in his first round match. Additionally, Prescott ranked 18th and 13th in the heat rounds of 50 m and 100 m backstroke events respectively. Sekona's was the first medal for Tonga in the history of the Games.

== Background ==
Independent Tonga became a member of the Commonwealth of Nations in 1970, and debuted in the Commonwealth Games in 1974 in Christchurch, New Zealand. Tonga did not participate in first two—2000 Edinburgh and 2004 Bendigo—Commonwealth Youth Games. It entered nine athletes (two men and seven women) in the 2008 Commonwealth Youth Games in Pune, India, competed in athletics, table tennis and tennis; but failed to win any medal. Tonga was one of the 63 nations that participated in the 2011 Commonwealth Youth Games held in the British Crown Dependency of Isle of Man from 7 to 13 September 2011, making its second Commonwealth Youth Games appearance. Tonga finished last in the medal table, in 22nd, sharing the position with nine other Commonwealth Games Associations.

== Delegation ==
The Tonga Association of Sports and National Olympic Committee selected a delegation consisting of three officials and four competitors for the 2011 Commonwealth Youth Games. None of the athletes had previously participated in the Commonwealth Youth Games. The first, Ana Katiloka, was the sole athlete to represent the nation in athletics. Two pugilists—Tevita Pomale and Heamasi Sekona—competed in the middleweight and light heavyweight classes. Irene Prescott, as the only swimmer from Tongan side, participated in two events. Also in the delegation as a chef de mission of Tonga for the Games was Hiko Fungavaka. The delegation was also accompanied by the head boxing coach Lolo Heimuli. The final member of the delegation was Sione Prescott as an extra official.

== Athletics ==
Athletics events were held in the National Sports Center Athletics Stadium. Ana Katiloka represented Tonga in the triple jump event of athletics. This event took place on 11 September 2011. Katiloka's best jump in the event was 10.41 m, and she finished last (eighth) in the final standings. The gold medal in this event was won by Nat Apikotoa of Australia with a best jump of 12.55 m.

Athlete	Events	Final	
Athlete	Events	Result	Rank
Ana Katiloka	Triple jump	10.41 m	8

== Boxing ==
Tonga's boxing squad consisted of two pugilists, Tevita Pomale and Heamasi Sekona, who participated in the middleweight and light heavyweight classes, respectively. Pomale was eliminated in the first round after losing to Cody Crowley of Canada. Sekona won a bronze medal in the light heavyweight class without winning a single match. He received a bye in his first match (quarterfinals), and lost to Calum Evans of Wales in the semifinals by a points difference of 23–14. The semifinal appearance of Sekona guaranteed him a bronze medal, which he shared with Jack Massey of England—another semifinalist who lost to gold medalist of the event, Brandon Allan of Australia.

Athlete	Event	Quarterfinals	Semifinals	Final	
Athlete	Event	Opposition Result	Opposition Result	Opposition Result	Rank
Tevita Pomale	Middleweight	Cody Crowley (CAN); L 5–16	Did Not Advance		
Heamasi Sekona	Light heavyweight	Bye	(Wales) Calum Evans (WAL); L 14–23	Did Not Advance	Bronze medal

- Bye = Athlete received a bye.

== Swimming ==
Irene Prescott was the sole swimmer in the delegation of Tonga. She competed in two events, the 50– and 100 m backstrokes. Prescott took a time of 33.52 to complete her preliminary heat of the 50 m backstroke and finished in 18th place, not high enough to ensure a berth in the final. She was also eliminated in the preliminary heat of 100 m backstroke after ranking 13th with a time of 1:13.42.

Athlete	Events	Heat		Final	
Athlete	Events	Time	Rank	Time	Rank
Irene Prescott	50 m backstroke	33.52	18	Did Not Advance	
Irene Prescott	100 m backstroke	1:13.42	13	Did Not Advance	

== See also ==
- Tonga at the 2010 Commonwealth Games
- Tonga at the 2010 Summer Youth Olympics
