= Bangladesh at the 2011 Commonwealth Youth Games =

- CG code: BAN
- CGA: Bangladesh Olympic Association

in Isle of Man
- Competitors: 4 in 3 sports
- Officials: 4
- Medals Ranked 23rd: Gold 0 Silver 0 Bronze 0 Total 0

Commonwealth Youth Games appearances
- 2000; 2004; 2008; 2011; 2015; 2017; 2023

Bangladesh competed in the 2011 Commonwealth Youth Games (officially known as the IV Commonwealth Youth Games) held in the Isle of Man from 7 to 13 September 2011. This was their second appearance in the Commonwealth Youth Games. The nation was represented by the Bangladesh Olympic Association, which is responsible for the Commonwealth Games and Commonwealth Youth Games in Bangladesh.

The Bangladeshi delegation consisted of four officials and four competitors: two men and two women, who took part in three different sports—athletics, boxing and swimming. (At the previous Commonwealth Youth Games, Bangladesh had a delegation of ten athletes.) None of the athletes won any medals. Papia Rani Sarkar finished sixth in the semifinal round of the 100 metres for women; bantamweight boxer Riyad Hossen received a bye into the quarterfinal, but then lost to Obedy Mutapa of Zambia. In the swimming heats, Sonia Akter finished 22nd in the 50 m backstroke and 19th in the 50 m butterfly, and Anik Islam finished 12th in the 50 m butterfly and 14th in the 100 m butterfly.

== Background ==
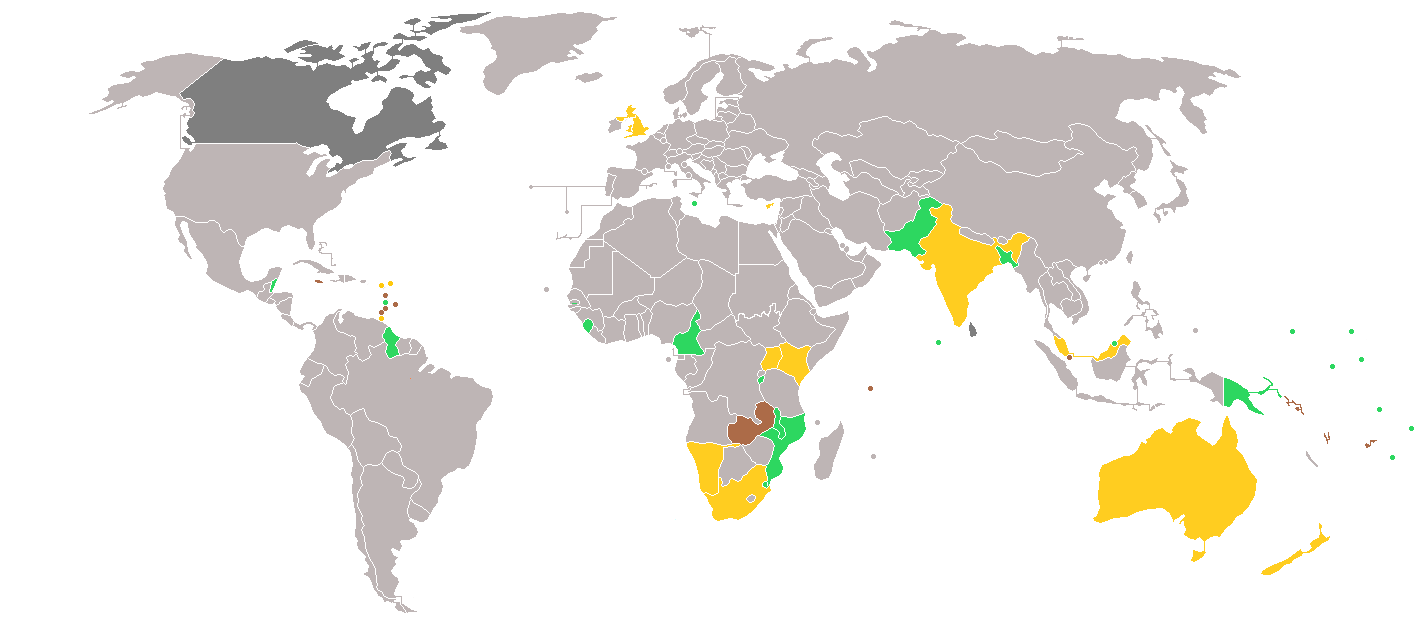
Medal map of the games. Bangladesh and other countries that won no medals are shown in green.

Bangladesh became a member of the Commonwealth of Nations in 1972 and made its Commonwealth Games debut in the 1990 Commonwealth Games in Auckland, New Zealand. The Bangladesh Olympic Association, the country's National Olympic Committee, is responsible for the Commonwealth and Commonwealth Youth Games in Bangladesh. Bangladesh did not participate in the first two Commonwealth Youth Games in Edinburgh (2000) and Bendigo (2004). For the 2008 Commonwealth Youth Games in Pune, India, it entered ten athletes, all men, who competed in athletics, boxing and shooting, winning one bronze medal in Weightlifting. Bangladesh was one of the 63 nations and territories taking part in the 2011 Commonwealth Youth Games held in the Isle of Man from 7 to 13 September 2011, making its second appearance in the games. This time Bangladesh, like 31 other countries, won no medals.

== Delegation ==
The age of every participant at the Commonwealth Youth Games is between fourteen and eighteen years in the year of event. Each Commonwealth Games Association can send a maximum of one thousand competitors. The Bangladesh Olympic Association selected a delegation consisting of four officials and four competitors for the 2011 Commonwealth Youth Games. Riyad Hossen, the only one to have taken part in the previous games, boxed in the bantamweight class. Papia Rani Sarkar was the only Bangladeshi competing in athletics. Sonia Akter and Anik Islam, the delegation's only two swimmers, each participated in two events. The head of delegation was A K Sarker.

== Athletics ==
Athletics events were held in the National Sports Center Athletics Stadium. Papia Rani Sarkar represented Bangladesh in the women's 100 m on 9 September 2011. She ran it in 12.66 seconds in the heats to qualify for the semifinals, and in 12.63 seconds to place sixth in the first semifinal. The gold medal in this event was won by Sophie Papps of England, with a time of 11.53 seconds in the final.

Athlete	Events	Heat 3		Semifinals		Final	
Athlete	Events	Time	Rank	Time	Rank	Time	Rank
Papia Rani Sarkar	women's 100 m	12.66 seconds	4 Q	12.63 seconds	6	did not advance	

- Q = Qualified for the next round

== Boxing ==
Bangladesh's boxing squad consisted of one contestant, Riyad Hossen, who boxed in the bantamweight class. He was eliminated in the quarterfinals, losing to Obedy Mutapa of Zambia with a points difference of 15–5 after receiving a bye in the previous round.

Athlete	Event	Last 16	Quarterfinals	Semifinals	Final	
Athlete	Event	Opposition Result	Opposition Result	Opposition Result	Opposition Result	Rank
Md. Riyad Hossen	Bantamweight	Bye	Obedy Mutapa (ZAM); L 5–15	did not advance		

- Bye = received a bye.

== Swimming ==
Sonia Akter and Anik Islam were the two Bangladeshi swimmers. Akter entered three events, the 50 m butterfly, 50 m backstroke and 50 m breaststroke. She completed her preliminary heat of the 50 m butterfly in 32.78 seconds, finishing in 19th place, not high enough to secure a place in the final. She was also eliminated in the preliminary heat of the 50 m backstroke, ranking 22nd with a time of 36.00 seconds in the heats. She did not start in the preliminary heat of the 50 m breaststroke. Anik Islam swam in the 50 m and 100 m butterfly. He finished the 50 m butterfly in a time of 26.97 seconds, ranking 14th, and the 100 m butterfly in 58.41 seconds, ranking 12th.

Athlete	Events	Heat		Final	
Athlete	Events	Time	Rank	Time	Rank
Sonia Akter	50 m butterfly	32.78	19	did not advance	
Sonia Akter	50 m backstroke	36:00	22	did not advance	
Sonia Akter	50 m breaststroke	DNS	DNS	did not advance	
Md. Anik Islam	100 m butterfly	58.41	12	did not advance	
Md. Anik Islam	50 m butterfly	26.97	14	did not advance	

- DNS = Did not start.

== See also ==
- Bangladesh at the 2010 Commonwealth Games
- Bangladesh at the 2010 Summer Youth Olympics
