= Teo Ee Yi =

Malaysian badminton player (born 1993)

Teo Ee Yi 张御宇
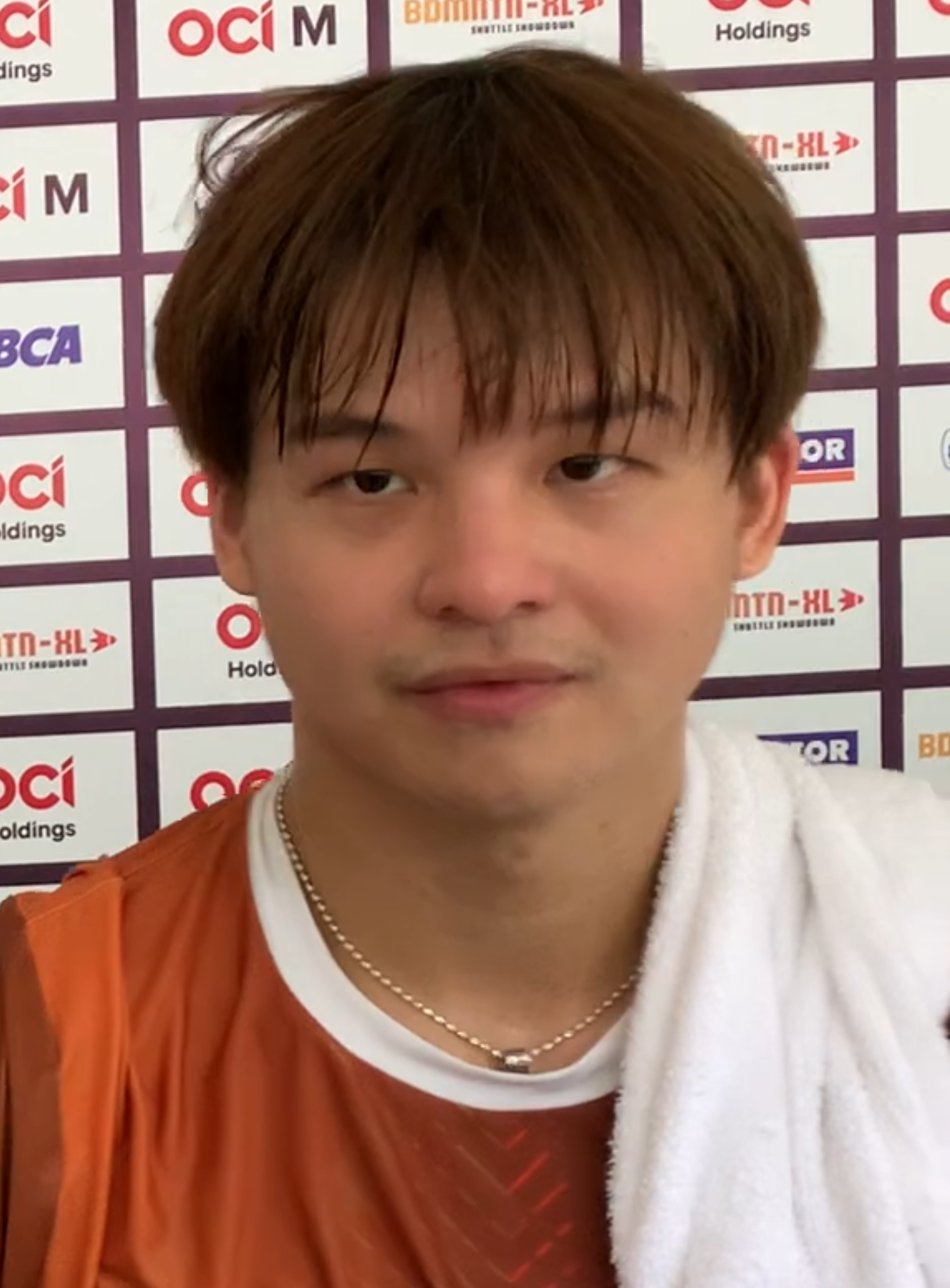
- Teo in 2024

Personal information
- Born: 4 April 1993 (age 33) Muar, Johor, Malaysia
- Height: 1.74 m (5 ft 9 in)

Sport
- Country: Malaysia
- Sport: Badminton
- Handedness: Right

Men's doubles
- Highest ranking: 6 (with Ong Yew Sin, 20 June 2023)
- Current ranking: 36 (with Chia Wei Jie, 10 November 2026)
- BWF profile
Medal record
Men's badminton
Representing Malaysia
World Championships
Bronze medal – third place	2021 Huelva	Men's doubles
Sudirman Cup
Bronze medal – third place	2023 Suzhou	Mixed team
Thomas Cup
Bronze medal – third place	2016 Kunshan	Men's team
Asian Championships
Silver medal – second place	2023 Dubai	Men's doubles
Asia Team Championships
Silver medal – second place	2020 Manila	Men's team
Bronze medal – third place	2018 Alor Setar	Men's team
SEA Games
Silver medal – second place	2017 Kuala Lumpur	Men's doubles
Silver medal – second place	2017 Kuala Lumpur	Men's team
Silver medal – second place	2019 Philippines	Men's team
Bronze medal – third place	2019 Philippines	Men's doubles
World Junior Championships
Gold medal – first place	2011 Taipei	Boys' doubles
Gold medal – first place	2011 Taipei	Mixed team
Silver medal – second place	2010 Guadalajara	Boys' doubles
Bronze medal – third place	2010 Guadalajara	Mixed team
Commonwealth Youth Games
Gold medal – first place	2011 Douglas	Boys' doubles
Gold medal – first place	2011 Douglas	Mixed doubles
Asian Junior Championships
Silver medal – second place	2010 Kuala Lumpur	Mixed team
Silver medal – second place	2011 Lucknow	Mixed team
Bronze medal – third place	2010 Kuala Lumpur	Boys' doubles
Bronze medal – third place	2011 Lucknow	Boys' doubles

Teo Ee Yi
- Traditional Chinese: 張御宇
- Simplified Chinese: 张御宇
Transcriptions
Standard Mandarin
- Hanyu Pinyin: Zhāng Yùyǔ
Yue: Cantonese
- Jyutping: Zoeng1 Jyu6 Jyu5
Southern Min
- Hokkien POJ: Tiuⁿ Gū-ú

Teo Ee Yi (simplified Chinese: 张御宇; traditional Chinese: 張御宇; pinyin: Zhāng Yùyǔ, born 4 April 1993) is a Malaysian badminton player. A world junior champion, world championship bronze medalist, Asian championship silver medalist and SEA Games silver medalist, he won the boys' doubles and mixed team gold medals at the 2011 BWF World Junior Championships. At senior level, he and his former longtime partner Ong Yew Sin won a bronze medal in men's doubles at the 2021 BWF World Championships and a silver medal at the 2023 Badminton Asia Championships. Together, they reached a career-high world ranking of number six on 20 June 2023.

At the 2011 BWF World Junior Championships, Teo won the boys' doubles gold medal alongside Nelson Heg, defeating Chinese Taipei's Huang Po-jui and Lin Chia-yu in the final. He also won the mixed team gold medal at the same tournament, following his boys' doubles silver medal at the 2010 BWF World Junior Championships. At the 2011 Commonwealth Youth Games, he won two additional gold medals, capturing the boys' doubles title with Heg and the mixed doubles title with Chow Mei Kuan. He also won boys' doubles bronze medals at the 2010 and 2011 Asian Junior Championships.

Together with Ong Yew Sin, Teo won the 2016 Bitburger Open and their first BWF World Tour title at the 2020 Thailand Masters, a Super 300 tournament. They also finished runners-up at the 2019 Malaysia Masters and 2022 Australian Open. At the 2017 SEA Games, Teo won silver medals in men's doubles and the men's team event, followed by a men's doubles bronze medal and men's team silver medal at the 2019 SEA Games. He also contributed to Malaysia's bronze medals at the 2023 Thomas Cup and 2023 Sudirman Cup, and a men's team silver medal at the 2020 Badminton Asia Team Championships.

After competing together for more than a decade, Teo and Ong ended their longstanding partnership in 2026. Teo subsequently formed a new men's doubles partnership with Chia Wei Jie, making their international debut at the 2026 Thailand Open.

== Career ==
Teo won his first Grand Prix title at the 2016 Bitburger Open with his partner, Ong Yew Sin.

Teo and Ong earned a silver and a bronze medal at the 2017 and 2019 SEA Games respectively. They were also runners-up at the 2019 Malaysia Masters.

In January 2020, they were dropped from the national team by the Badminton Association of Malaysia. Following the incident, they went on to win their first World Tour title at the 2020 Thailand Masters. At the Indonesia badminton festival in Bali, they finished as semifinalists at the 2021 Indonesia Masters and the 2021 BWF World Tour Finals.

Their best achievement was winning the men's doubles silver medal at the 2023 Badminton Asia Championships after narrowly losing to Satwiksairaj Rankireddy and Chirag Shetty with score of 21–16, 17–21, 19–21 in 66 minutes. They won the men's doubles bronze medal at the 2021 BWF World Championships, where they had to go through a narrow fight against Olympic champions Lee Yang and Wang Chi-lin in the quarterfinals. Because of their achievements, they were selected to be part of the Malaysian squad in the 2022 Thomas Cup.

== Achievements ==
=== World Championships ===
Men's doubles
Year	Venue	Partner	Opponent	Score	Result
2021	Palacio de los Deportes Carolina Marín, Huelva, Spain	(Malaysia) Ong Yew Sin	(Japan) Takuro Hoki (Japan) Yugo Kobayashi	13–21, 9–21	Bronze

=== Asian Championships ===
Men's doubles
Year	Venue	Partner	Opponent	Score	Result
2023	Sheikh Rashid Bin Hamdan Indoor Hall; Dubai, United Arab Emirates	(Malaysia) Ong Yew Sin	(India) Satwiksairaj Rankireddy (India) Chirag Shetty	21–16, 17–21, 19–21	Silver

=== SEA Games ===
Men's doubles
Year	Venue	Partner	Opponent	Score	Result
2017	Axiata Arena; Kuala Lumpur, Malaysia	(Malaysia) Ong Yew Sin	(Thailand) Kittinupong Kedren (Thailand) Dechapol Puavaranukroh	19–21, 22–20, 17–21	Silver
2019	Muntinlupa Sports Complex; Metro Manila, Philippines	(Malaysia) Ong Yew Sin	(Thailand) Bodin Isara (Thailand) Maneepong Jongjit	12–21, 21–16, 19–21	Bronze

=== World Junior Championships ===
Boys' doubles
Year	Venue	Partner	Opponent	Score	Result
2010	Domo del Code Jalisco; Guadalajara, Mexico	(Malaysia) Nelson Heg	(Malaysia) Ow Yao Han (Malaysia) Yew Hong Kheng	18–21, 15–21	Silver
2011	Taoyuan Arena; Taoyuan City, Taipei, Taiwan	(Malaysia) Nelson Heg	(Chinese Taipei) Huang Po-jui (Chinese Taipei) Lin Chia-yu	21–17, 21–17	Gold

=== Commonwealth Youth Games ===
Boys' doubles
Year	Venue	Partner	Opponent	Score	Result
2011	National Sports Centre, Douglas, Isle of Man	(Malaysia) Nelson Heg	(England) Ryan McCarthy (England) Tom Wolfenden	24–22, 21–16	Gold

Mixed doubles
Year	Venue	Partner	Opponent	Score	Result
2011	National Sports Centre, Douglas, Isle of Man	(Malaysia) Chow Mei Kuan	(India) Srikanth Kidambi (India) K. Maneesha	18–21, 21–16, 21–8	Gold

=== Asian Junior Championships ===
Boys' doubles
Year	Venue	Partner	Opponent	Score	Result
2010	Stadium Juara; Kuala Lumpur, Malaysia	(Malaysia) Nelson Heg	(South Korea) Choi Seung-il (South Korea) Kang Ji-wook	13–21, 14–21	Bronze
2011	Babu Banarasi Das Indoor Stadium; Lucknow, India	(Malaysia) Nelson Heg	(Chinese Taipei) Huang Po-jui (Chinese Taipei) Lin Chia-yu	16–21, 21–11, 17–21	Bronze

=== BWF World Tour (1 title, 2 runners-up) ===
The BWF World Tour, which was announced on 19 March 2017 and implemented in 2018, is a series of elite badminton tournaments sanctioned by the Badminton World Federation (BWF). The BWF World Tour is divided into levels of World Tour Finals, Super 1000, Super 750, Super 500, Super 300 (part of the HSBC World Tour), and the BWF Tour Super 100.

Men's doubles
Year	Tournament	Level	Partner	Opponent	Score	Result
2019	Malaysia Masters	Super 500	(Malaysia) Ong Yew Sin	(Indonesia) Marcus Fernaldi Gideon (Indonesia) Kevin Sanjaya Sukamuljo	15–21, 16–21	(silver) Runner-up
2020	Thailand Masters	Super 300	(Malaysia) Ong Yew Sin	(China) Huang Kaixiang (China) Liu Cheng	18–21, 21–17, 21–17	(gold) Winner
2022	Australian Open	Super 300	(Malaysia) Ong Yew Sin	(China) Liu Yuchen (China) Ou Xuanyi	16–21, 20–22	(silver) Runner-up

=== BWF Grand Prix (1 title, 1 runner-up) ===
The BWF Grand Prix had two levels, the Grand Prix and Grand Prix Gold. It was a series of badminton tournaments sanctioned by the Badminton World Federation (BWF) and played between 2007 and 2017.

Men's doubles
Year	Tournament	Partner	Opponent	Score	Result
2016	Bitburger Open	(Malaysia) Ong Yew Sin	(Germany) Michael Fuchs (Germany) Johannes Schöttler	21–16, 21–18	(gold) Winner
2017	New Zealand Open	(Malaysia) Ong Yew Sin	(Chinese Taipei) Chen Hung-ling (Chinese Taipei) Wang Chi-lin	16–21, 18–21	(silver) Runner-up

BWF Grand Prix Gold tournament
BWF Grand Prix tournament

=== BWF International Challenge/Series (6 titles) ===
Men's doubles
Year	Tournament	Partner	Opponent	Score	Result
2012	Dutch International	(Malaysia) Nelson Heg	(Netherlands) Jorrit de Ruiter (Netherlands) Dave Khodabux	19–21, 21–13, 21–9	(gold) Winner
2012	Malaysia International	(Malaysia) Goh V Shem	(Malaysia) Low Juan Shen (Malaysia) Tan Yip Jiun	21–15, 21–12	(gold) Winner
2013	Finnish Open	(Malaysia) Nelson Heg	(Malaysia) Mohd Lutfi Zaim Abdul Khalid (Malaysia) Tan Wee Gieen	21–14 21–12	(gold) Winner
2016	Portugal International	(Malaysia) Ong Yew Sin	(Vietnam) Đỗ Tuấn Đức (Vietnam) Phạm Hồng Nam	21–17, 24–22	(gold) Winner
2016	Romanian International	(Malaysia) Ong Yew Sin	(Croatia) Zvonimir Đurkinjak (Croatia) Zvonimir Hölbling	21–13, 21–9	(gold) Winner
2016	Vietnam International	(Malaysia) Ong Yew Sin	(Japan) Kenya Mitsuhashi (Japan) Yuta Watanabe	21–19, 21–14	(gold) Winner

BWF International Challenge tournament
BWF International Series tournament
