= Daniel Lewis (boxer) =

Australian boxer (born 1993)

Personal information
- Nationality: Australian
- Born: Daniel Jason Lewis; 18 December 1993 (age 32) Penrith, New South Wales, Australia
- Height: 5 ft 10 in (178 cm)
- Weight: Light Middleweight

Boxing career
- Reach: 71.5 in (182 cm)
- Stance: Orthodox

Boxing record
- Total fights: 7
- Wins: 6
- Win by KO: 4
- Losses: 1
Medal record
Men's amateur boxing
Representing Australia
Commonwealth Youth Games
| Gold medal – first place | 2011 Isle of Man | Light-welterweight |

Daniel Lewis (born 18 December 1993) is an Australian professional boxer. As an amateur, he won a gold medal while representing Australia at the 2011 Commonwealth Youth Games.

== Amateur career ==
=== Commonwealth Youth Games ===
In 2011, Lewis competed and won gold for Australia at the 2011 Commonwealth Youth Games in the light-welterweight division, winning the final against England's Darren Tetley with a score of 27–24.

=== 2014 Commonwealth Games ===
Lewis finished in sixth place in the boxing men's welterweight at the 2014 Commonwealth Games. Lewis was ruled out of his welterweight quarter-final bout against Indian boxer Mandeep Jangra by medical staff after suffering a cut above the eye during his second round – round of 16 – unanimous points win over Nigeria's Kehinde Ademuyiwa. Lewis and his team called for a return of headgear for the games after he was ruled out.

=== 2016 Rio Olympics ===
He competed in the men's middleweight event at the 2016 Summer Olympics. He won his first bout in the round of 32 against Polish boxer Tomasz Jabłoński 2–1, but lost his second bout 0–3 in the round of 16 against Uzbek boxer Bektemir Melikuziev.

== Professional career ==
Lewis made his pro-boxing debut on 23 May 2019 at the Wildfighter boxing event presented by Will Tomlinson in Melbourne, Australia where he scored the second round knockout win against Sanong Seepongsert of Thailand.

He won his first six professional fights, before losing to future world champion Sebastian Fundora by unanimous decision on the undercard of Deontay Wilder vs. Tyson Fury 2 at MGM Grand Garden Arena in Paradise, Nevada, USA, on 22 February 2020.

== Professional boxing record ==
| 7 fights | 6 wins | 1 loss |
|---|---|---|
| By knockout | 4 | 0 |
| By decision | 2 | 1 |

| No. | Result | Record | Opponent | Type | Round, time | Date | Location | Notes |
|---|---|---|---|---|---|---|---|---|
| 7 | Loss | 6–1 | (United States) Sebastian Fundora | UD | 10 | 22 Feb 2020 | (United States) MGM Grand Garden Arena, Paradise, Nevada, US | |
| 6 | Win | 6–0 | (Indonesia) Rivo Kundimang | KO | 2 (10), 1:43 | 21 Dec 2019 | Entertainment Centre, Sydney, Australia | |
| 5 | Win | 5–0 | (United States) Alexis Gaytan | UD | 8 | 2 Nov 2019 | (United States) Dignity Health Sports Park, Carson, California, US | |
| 4 | Win | 4–0 | (Australia) Siliveni Nawai | TKO | 2 (6) | 27 Sep 2019 | Arena Sports Club, Sydney, Australia | |
| 3 | Win | 3–0 | (Australia) Wade Ryan | UD | 10 | 27 Jul 2019 | Luna Park, Sydney, Australia | Won vacant Australian super-welterweight title |
| 2 | Win | 2–0 | (Australia) Freddy Marai | TKO | 2 (4), 0:26 | 21 Jun 2019 | Club Punchbowl, Punchbowl, Australia | |
| 1 | Win | 1–0 | (Thailand) Sanong Seepongsert | KO | 2 (6) | 23 Mar 2019 | The Timberyard, Melbourne, Australia | |
