= Srikanth Kidambi =

Indian badminton player (born 1993)

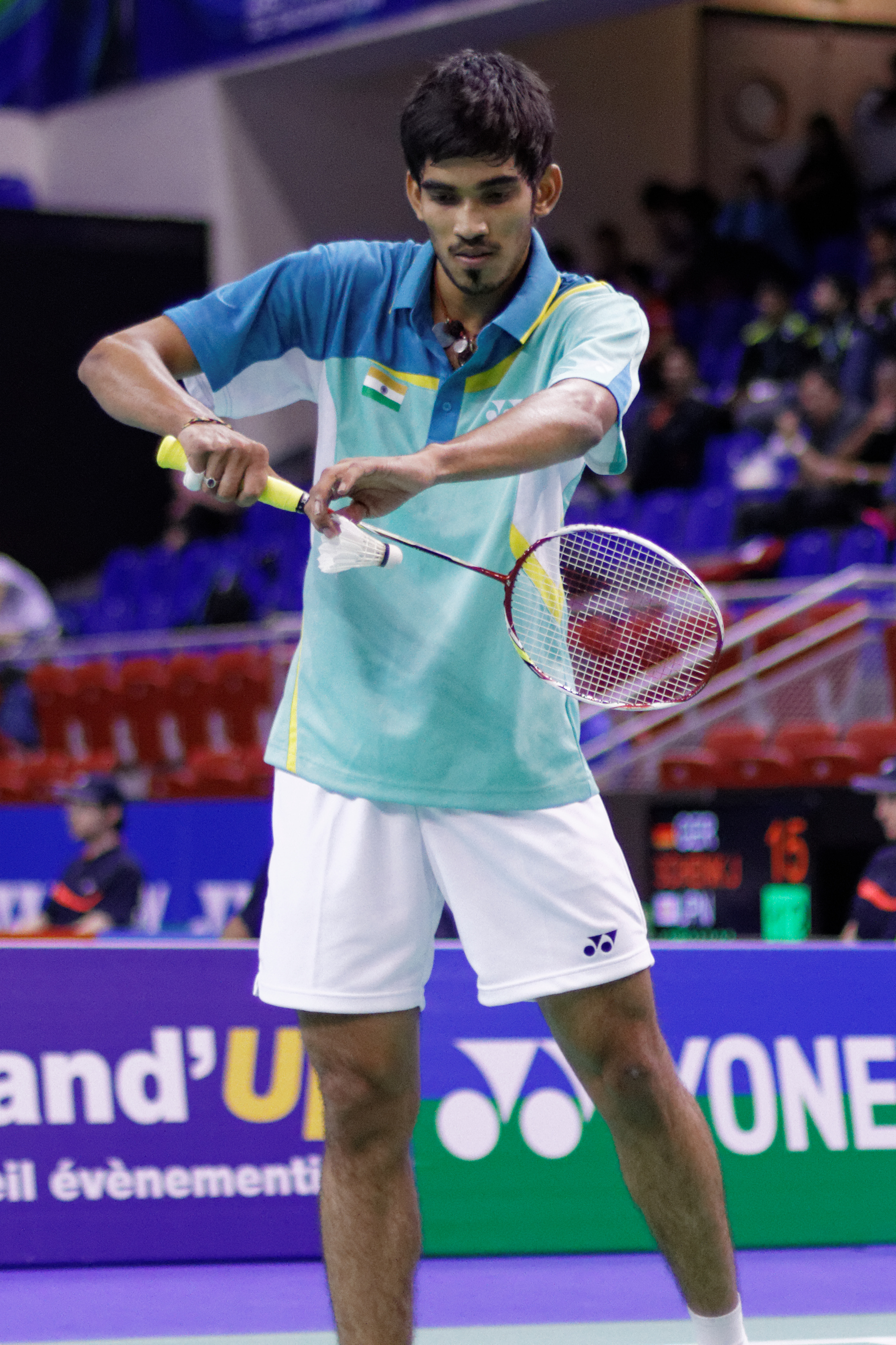
- Kidambi at the 2013 French Super Series

Personal information
- Born: Srikanth Kidambi; 7 February 1993 (age 33) Ravulapalem, Andhra Pradesh, India
- Height: 1.78 m (5 ft 10 in)
- Weight: 73 kg (161 lb)

Sport
- Country: India
- Sport: Badminton
- Handedness: Right
- Coached by: Pullela Gopichand

Men's singles
- Career record: 336 wins, 207 losses
- Highest ranking: 1 (12 April 2018)
- Current ranking: 31 (27 October 2026)
- Honours: Arjuna Award; Padma Shri
- BWF profile
Medal record
Men's badminton
Representing India
World Championships
| Silver medal – second place | 2021 Huelva | Men's singles |
Thomas Cup
| Gold medal – first place | 2022 Bangkok | Men's team |
| Bronze medal – third place | 2026 Horsens | Men's team |
Commonwealth Games
| Gold medal – first place | 2018 Gold Coast | Mixed team |
| Silver medal – second place | 2018 Gold Coast | Men's singles |
| Silver medal – second place | 2022 Birmingham | Mixed team |
| Bronze medal – third place | 2022 Birmingham | Men's singles |
Asian Games
| Silver medal – second place | 2022 Hangzhou | Men's team |
| Bronze medal – third place | 2026 Aichi–Nagoya | Men's team |
Asian Team Championships
| Bronze medal – third place | 2016 Hyderabad | Men's team |
| Bronze medal – third place | 2020 Manila | Men's team |
South Asian Games
| Gold medal – first place | 2016 Shillong | Men's singles |
| Gold medal – first place | 2016 Shillong | Men's team |
| Gold medal – first place | 2019 Pokhara | Men's team |
Asian Junior Championships
| Bronze medal – third place | 2011 Lucknow | Mixed team |
Commonwealth Youth Games
| Silver medal – second place | 2011 Douglas | Mixed doubles |
| Bronze medal – third place | 2011 Douglas | Boys' doubles |

Srikanth Kidambi (born 7 February 1993) is an Indian badminton player. He represented India in men's singles at the 2016 Rio Olympics, finishing fifth after a quarterfinal run. In April 2018, he made history by becoming the first Indian male to achieve the World No.1 ranking since Prakash Padukone. He made history in 2021 by becoming the first Indian male to reach the final of the BWF World Championships in the men's singles category, winning a silver medal. Kidambi also served as the captain of the historic Thomas Cup-winning team in 2022, leading India to its first-ever title in the tournament.

== Early life and background ==
Srikanth Nammalwar Kidambi was born in Ravulapalem, Andhra Pradesh on 7 February 1993 to a Telugu family. His father, KVS Krishna, is a landlord, and his mother Radha is a house-wife. His older brother K. Nandagopal is also a badminton player and junior national champion with his brother. They used to live in the same house until 2008 and then Srikanth moved to the Gopichand Academy to continue his practice.

== Career ==
=== 2011 ===
In the 2011 Commonwealth Youth Games in the Isle of Man, Kidambi won the bronze medal in men's doubles and silver in mixed doubles. He also emerged as the winner in the singles and doubles category at the All India Junior International Badminton Championship held in Pune.

=== 2012 ===
In 2012, Kidambi overcame the then Junior World Champion Zulfadli Zulkiffli of Malaysia in the Maldives International Challenge to claim the men's singles title.

=== 2013 ===
In the Thailand Open Grand Prix Gold event, Kidambi won the men's singles title, beating then world number eight and local favorite Boonsak Ponsana in straight games. In the same year, Kidambi beat reigning champion and Olympian Parupalli Kashyap in the All India Senior National Championships in Delhi to claim his first senior national title. He was also part of the Awadhe Warriors team that finished second in the Indian Badminton League, 2013.

=== 2014 ===
Kidambi finished runner up at the 2014 India Open Grand Prix Gold event in Lucknow and was a quarterfinalist in the 2014 Malaysian Open. He was part of the Indian badminton contingent that reached the semi-finals of the mixed team event at the Commonwealth Games 2014 in Glasgow. He also reached the quarter-finals of the men's singles event in the same tournament. In November, he created a major upset in the final of the 2014 China Open Super Series Premier by beating 5-time World Champion and 2-time Olympic Champion Lin Dan in straight games (21–19, 21–17), thus becoming the first Indian to win a Super Series Premier men's title. He then reached the semi-finals of the Hong Kong Open Super Series after beating Taiwan's Chou Tien-chen in an early round. He lost to Chen Long of China in three games in the semi-finals. With those wins, he was qualified for the World Superseries Finals. He defeated Kento Momota (15–21, 21–16, 21–10) and Tommy Sugiarto (21–18, 21–13) in the group stage to reach the semi-final of the prestigious BWF Super Series Masters Finals, where he lost again to Chen Long of China.

=== 2015 ===
Kidambi became the first Indian man to win gold at the 2015 Swiss Open Grand Prix Gold by defeating Viktor Axelsen 21–15, 12–21, 21–14. During the same year, he also won the India Open Super Series title by defeating Viktor Axelsen in the final.

=== 2016 ===
Kidambi reached the semifinal in the Malaysia Masters, where he lost to Iskandar Zulkarnain Zainuddin of Malaysia in January. The following week, he won the Syed Modi International Badminton Championships Grand Prix Gold title, defeating Huang Yuxiang 21–13, 14–21, 21–14 in the final. At the 2016 South Asian Games, he won two gold medals, in men's team and men's singles, defeating Prannoy H. S. in the singles final. At the 2016 Badminton Asia Team Championship, although his team lost in the semifinal, he remained undefeated.

In the 2016 Rio Olympics, the World No. 11 Kidambi entered the Round of 16 of the men's singles by beating Lino Muñoz and Henri Hurskainen. He went on to beat World No. 5 Jan Ø. Jørgensen 21–19, 21–19 to reach the quarterfinals, but was defeated by Lin Dan by a score of 6–21, 21–11, and 18–21.

=== 2017 ===
Kidambi and Sai Praneeth created history when they became the first ever Indian pair to enter the finals of a ranking event in Badminton. Both hailing from Hyderabad and being coached by Pullela Gopichand, it was Sai Praneeth who prevailed 17–21, 21–17, 21–12 eventually to clinch the Singapore Super Series title.

Kidambi won the Indonesia Super Series beating Japan's Kazumasa Sakai 21–11, 21–19, thereby becoming the first ever Indian male player to do so. He went on to win the Australian Super Series beating China's Chen Long 22–20, 21–16 in the final, setting an Indian record for entering three consecutive Super Series Finals. At the World Championships, he was defeated in the quarter-final by South Korea's Son Wan-Ho in straight games. At the next Super Series, the Denmark, he won the title defeating Lee Hyun-il of Korea 21–10, 21–5 in the final. Following his good run, Kidambi became the fourth player ever to win four Super Series titles in a year, after he won the French Super Series that followed, defeating Japan's Kenta Nishimoto 21–14, 21–13 in the final. In the process, he equalled the record held by Lee Chong Wei, Lin Dan, and Chen Long. Following the victory, he reached his career-best world ranking of 2.

=== 2018 ===
Kidambi started 2018 at the India Open as the second seed. He was defeated in the second round by Iskandar Zulkarnain Zainuddin who had qualified from the qualifiers. He also lost in the second round at the All England Open to Chinese player Huang Yuxiang in three games. At the Commonwealth Games in Gold Coast, Kidambi was more successful, winning a gold in the mixed team event, and a silver in the singles event. He achieved the world number 1 ranking for a week during this period. Kidambi lost to Liew Daren 18–21, 18–21 at the world championships pre-quarters. Kidambi had a disappointing 2018 Asian Games where in singles he lost in 1st round to Wong Wing Ki 21–23, 19–21 and in the team event after defeating Maldives 3–0 in the 1st round his team suffered a loss to Indonesia in quarterfinals.

=== 2019 ===
Kidambi represented his country at the South Asian Games in Nepal, and won the gold medal in the team event.

=== 2021 ===
In 2021, Kidambi reached the finals of World championships becoming the first Indian male badminton player to do so. He lost the final to Loh Kean Yew to win the silver medal.

=== 2022 ===
Kidambi was part of the Indian men's team for Thomas Cup 2022. The team went on to win the Thomas Cup by beating Indonesia 3–0 in the final, with Kidambi winning his match against Jonatan Christie.

== Achievements ==
=== World Championships ===
Men's singles
| Year | Venue | Opponent | Score | Result |
|---|---|---|---|---|
| 2021 | Palacio de los Deportes Carolina Marín, Huelva, Spain | (Singapore) Loh Kean Yew | 15–21, 20–22 | Silver |

=== Commonwealth Games ===
Men's singles
| Year | Venue | Opponent | Score | Result |
|---|---|---|---|---|
| 2018 | Carrara Sports and Leisure Centre, Gold Coast, Australia | (Malaysia) Lee Chong Wei | 21–19, 14–21, 14–21 | Silver |
| 2022 | National Exhibition Centre, Birmingham, England | (Singapore) Jason Teh | 21–15, 21–18 | Bronze |

=== South Asian Games ===
Men's singles
| Year | Venue | Opponent | Score | Result |
|---|---|---|---|---|
| 2016 | Multipurpose Hall SAI–SAG Centre, Shillong, India | (India) Prannoy H. S. | 11–21, 21–14, 21–6 | Gold |

=== Commonwealth Youth Games ===
Boys' doubles
| Year | Venue | Partner | Opponent | Score | Result |
|---|---|---|---|---|---|
| 2011 | National Sports Centre, Douglas, Isle of Man | (India) Hema Thandarang | (Canada) Nathan Choi (Canada) Nyl Yakura | 21–14, 15–21, 21–12 | Bronze |

Mixed doubles
| Year | Venue | Partner | Opponent | Score | Result |
|---|---|---|---|---|---|
| 2011 | National Sports Centre, Douglas, Isle of Man | (India) K. Maneesha | (Malaysia) Teo Ee Yi (Malaysia) Chow Mei Kuan | 21–18, 16–21, 8–21 | Silver |

=== BWF World Tour (4 runners-up) ===
The BWF World Tour, which was announced on 19 March 2017 and implemented in 2018, is a series of elite badminton tournaments sanctioned by the Badminton World Federation (BWF). The BWF World Tours are divided into levels of World Tour Finals, Super 1000, Super 750, Super 500, Super 300 (part of the HSBC World Tour), and the BWF Tour Super 100.

Men's singles
| Year | Tournament | Level | Opponent | Score | Result | Ref. |
|---|---|---|---|---|---|---|
| 2019 | India Open | Super 500 | (Denmark) Viktor Axelsen | 7–21, 20–22 | (silver) Runner-up | |
| 2025 | Malaysia Masters | Super 500 | (China) Li Shifeng | 11–21, 9–21 | (silver) Runner-up | |
| 2025 | Syed Modi International | Super 300 | (Hong Kong) Jason Gunawan | 16–21, 21–8, 20–22 | (silver) Runner-up | |
| 2026 | U.S. Open | Super 300 | (Chinese Taipei) Su Li-yang | 15–21, 21–16, 9–21 | (silver) Runner-up | |

=== BWF Superseries (6 titles, 1 runner-up) ===
The BWF Superseries, which was launched on 14 December 2006 and implemented in 2007, is a series of elite badminton tournaments, sanctioned by the Badminton World Federation (BWF). BWF Superseries levels are Superseries and Superseries Premier. A season of Superseries consists of twelve tournaments around the world that have been introduced since 2011. Successful players are invited to the Superseries Finals, which are held at the end of each year.

Men's singles
| Year | Tournament | Opponent | Score | Result |
|---|---|---|---|---|
| 2014 | China Open | (China) Lin Dan | 21–19, 21–17 | (gold) Winner |
| 2015 | India Open | (Denmark) Viktor Axelsen | 18–21, 21–13, 21–12 | (gold) Winner |
| 2017 | Singapore Open | (India) B. Sai Praneeth | 21–17, 17–21, 12–21 | (silver) Runner–up |
| 2017 | Indonesia Open | (Japan) Kazumasa Sakai | 21–11, 21–19 | (gold) Winner |
| 2017 | Australian Open | (China) Chen Long | 22–20, 21–16 | (gold) Winner |
| 2017 | Denmark Open | (South Korea) Lee Hyun-il | 21–10, 21–5 | (gold) Winner |
| 2017 | French Open | (Japan) Kenta Nishimoto | 21–14, 21–13 | (gold) Winner |

BWF Super Series Premier tournament
BWF Super Series tournament

=== BWF Grand Prix (3 titles, 3 runners-up) ===
The BWF Grand Prix had two levels, the BWF Grand Prix and Grand Prix Gold. It was a series of badminton tournaments sanctioned by the Badminton World Federation (BWF) which was held from 2007 to 2017.

Men's singles
| Year | Tournament | Opponent | Score | Result |
|---|---|---|---|---|
| 2013 | Thailand Open | (Thailand) Boonsak Ponsana | 21–16, 21–12 | (gold) Winner |
| 2014 | India Grand Prix Gold | (China) Xue Song | 21–16, 19–21, 13–21 | (silver) Runner-up |
| 2015 | Syed Modi International | (India) Parupalli Kashyap | 21–23, 21–23 | (silver) Runner-up |
| 2015 | Swiss Open | (Denmark) Viktor Axelsen | 21–15, 12–21, 21–14 | (gold) Winner |
| 2015 | Indonesian Masters | (Indonesia) Tommy Sugiarto | 21–17, 13–21, 22–24 | (silver) Runner-up |
| 2016 | Syed Modi International | (China) Huang Yuxiang | 21–13, 14–21, 21–14 | (gold) Winner |

BWF Grand Prix Gold tournament
BWF Grand Prix tournament

=== BWF International Challenge/Series (1 title) ===
Men's singles
| Year | Tournament | Opponent | Score | Result |
|---|---|---|---|---|
| 2012 | Maldives International | (Malaysia) Zulfadli Zulkiffli | 13–21, 21–11, 21–16 | (gold) Winner |

BWF International Challenge tournament
BWF International Series tournament

== Record against selected opponents ==
Record against Year-end Finals finalists, World Championships semi-finalists, and Olympic quarter-finalists. Accurate as of 31 July 2025.

| Player | Matches | Win | Lost | Diff. |
|---|---|---|---|---|
| (China) Chen Long | 9 | 2 | 7 | –5 |
| (China) Lin Dan | 5 | 2 | 3 | –1 |
| (China) Shi Yuqi | 6 | 4 | 2 | +2 |
| (China) Tian Houwei | 8 | 2 | 6 | –4 |
| (China) Zhao Junpeng | 3 | 1 | 2 | –1 |
| (Chinese Taipei) Chou Tien-chen | 11 | 4 | 7 | –3 |
| (Denmark) Anders Antonsen | 6 | 3 | 3 | 0 |
| (Denmark) Viktor Axelsen | 14 | 3 | 11 | –8 |
| (Denmark) Jan Ø. Jørgensen | 6 | 4 | 2 | +2 |
| (Denmark) Hans-Kristian Vittinghus | 6 | 4 | 2 | +2 |
| (England) Rajiv Ouseph | 4 | 4 | 0 | +4 |
| (France) Christo Popov | 3 | 2 | 1 | +1 |
| (India) Parupalli Kashyap | 4 | 2 | 2 | 0 |
| (India) B. Sai Praneeth | 10 | 5 | 5 | 0 |
| (India) Lakshya Sen | 3 | 3 | 0 | +3 |
| (India) Prannoy H. S. | 10 | 7 | 3 | +4 |

| Player | Matches | Win | Lost | Diff. |
|---|---|---|---|---|
| (Indonesia) Anthony Sinisuka Ginting | 7 | 2 | 5 | –3 |
| (Indonesia) Sony Dwi Kuncoro | 1 | 1 | 0 | +1 |
| (Indonesia) Tommy Sugiarto | 6 | 3 | 3 | 0 |
| (Japan) Kento Momota | 19 | 3 | 16 | –13 |
| (Japan) Kodai Naraoka | 4 | 0 | 4 | –4 |
| (Japan) Sho Sasaki | 1 | 1 | 0 | +1 |
| (Malaysia) Lee Chong Wei | 7 | 1 | 6 | –5 |
| (Malaysia) Liew Daren | 4 | 1 | 3 | –2 |
| (Malaysia) Wong Choong Hann | 1 | 1 | 0 | +1 |
| (Malaysia) Lee Zii Jia | 7 | 2 | 5 | –3 |
| (Singapore) Loh Kean Yew | 3 | 1 | 2 | –1 |
| (South Korea) Heo Kwang-hee | 1 | 1 | 0 | +1 |
| (South Korea) Lee Hyun-il | 1 | 1 | 0 | +1 |
| (South Korea) Son Wan-ho | 12 | 5 | 7 | –2 |
| (Thailand) Boonsak Ponsana | 5 | 3 | 2 | +1 |
| (Thailand) Kunlavut Vitidsarn | 5 | 1 | 4 | –3 |
| (Thailand) Kantaphon Wangcharoen | 4 | 3 | 1 | +2 |
| (Vietnam) Nguyễn Tiến Minh | 3 | 2 | 1 | +1 |

== Awards ==
- ₹500,000 award announced for Kidambi from BAI for 2015 Swiss Open Grand Prix Gold victory. He defeated Viktor Axelsen in the final 21–15,12–21,21–14.
- ₹500,000 award announced for Kidambi from BAI for 2015 India Super Series victory. He defeated Viktor Axelsen in the final 18–21, 21–13, 21–12.
- ₹500,000 award announced for Kidambi from BAI for 2017 Indonesia Super Series Premier victory. He defeated Kazumasa Sakai in the final 21–11, 21–19.
- ₹500,000 award announced for Kidambi from BAI for 2017 Australian Super Series victory. He defeated Chen Long in the final 22–20, 21–16.
- On 21 March 2018, Kidambi received Padma Shri, India's fourth-highest civilian award from Ram Nath Kovind, the President of India.

== See also ==
- Badminton in India
- India national badminton team
