= Jackson Woods =

Australian boxer

Personal information
- Full name: Jackson Woods
- Nationality: Australia
- Born: 1 February 1993 (age 33) Latrobe, Tasmania, Australia
- Height: 1.70 m (5 ft 7 in)
- Weight: 52 kg (115 lb)

Sport
- Sport: Boxing
- Weight class: Flyweight
- Club: Latrobe Boxing Club
Medal record
Men's amateur boxing
Representing Australia
Commonwealth Youth Games
Silver medal – second place	2011 Isle of Man	Flyweight

Jackson Woods (born 1 February 1993 in Latrobe, Tasmania) is an amateur boxer who has represented Australia at the World Youth Games and Commonwealth Youth Games. He was selected for the 2012 Summer Olympics in the flyweight division.

Woods began boxing in 2006 and won the Tasmanian junior title that same year. He has appeared at the Australian titles every year since then. In 2010, he won the Australian title, earning him a trip to the World Youth Games in Baku where he made the quarter-finals. In 2011, he went to the Commonwealth Youth Games on the Isle of Man where he won a silver medal in his weight class. In 2012, he stepped up to senior level winning both the Australian and Oceania titles and earning a place at the London Olympics.
