= 2011 in Indian sports =

== June ==
- India's Rohan Bopanna and Pakistan's Aisam-ul-Haq Qureshi won the Gerry Weber Open in Halle.

== August ==
- Champion double-trap shooter and Asian Games gold medalist Ronjan Sodhi was ranked No.1 in the world, as per the latest rankings released by the International Shooting Sport Federation (ISSF).
- India's under-16 football team was defeated by Pakistan 1-2 in the title clash of the SAFF Championship
- In cricket, India slipped from first to third position after losing Test Series to England by 4-0.
- Leander Paes and Mahesh Bhupathi won Doubles Title at the Cincinnati Masters.
- Gagan Narang was conferred the Rajiv Gandhi Khel Ratna. Rahul Banerjee (archery), Preeja Sreedharan (athletics), Vikas Gowda (athletics), Jwala Gutta (badminton), M Suranjoy Singh (boxing), Zaheer Khan (cricket), Sunil Chhetri (football), Ashish Kumar (gymnastics), Rajpal Singh (hockey), Rakesh Kumar (kabaddi, men), Tejaswini Bai V (kabaddi, women), Tejaswini Sawant (shooting), Virdhawal Khade (swimming), Somdev Devvarman (tennis), Sanjay Kumar (volleyball), Ravinder Singh (wrestling), Katulu Ravi Kumar (weightlifting), W Sandhyarani Devi (wushu), Prasanta Karmakar (para-swimming) received the Arjuna awards.

== September ==
- Rahul Sangma of Delhi won the Sunita Singh Memorial National youth (under-25) chess championship at Indore.
- Preeja Sreedharan won the gold medal in the 10000m race on the opening day of the 51st National Open Athletics Championships held in Kolkata.
- India defeated Pakistan 4-2 in the penalty shoot-out in the final to clinch the inaugural Asian Champions Trophy hockey tournament.
- In Commonwealth Youth Games held in the Isle of Man India won 3 Gold medals and secured ninth position. Pusarla Venkata Sindhu won a gold for in the women's singles event of badminton. In athletics, Durgesh Kumar and Navjetdeep Singh won gold medals for 400 m hurdles and shot put, respectively.
- India's Deepika Kumari of India settled for a silver after being defeated by China's Cheng Ming in the women's individual recurve summit clash at the World Cup archery finals in Istanbul
- Salgaocar defeated East Bengal 3-1 in the final of 33rd Federation Cup.

== October ==
- Ministry of Youth Affairs and Sports on 9 October 2011 launched the nationwide Come and Play scheme in New Delhi. Through this scheme, the ministry aims at opening SAI's sporting infrastructure for the youth across India.
- In the best ever performance in Asian age group swimming championship, India bags 8 golds medals. Gold medalists include Virdhawal Khade, Sandeep Sejwal, Rehan Poncha etc.
- Vinod Kumar (freestyle) and Anil (Greco-Roman) won the gold medal in the 56th National Wrestling Championships at Nandininagar, UP
- MC Mary Kom, Mandakini Chann, Kavita Goyat and Neetu Chahal won gold at the 12th Senior Women's National Boxing Championships in Bhopal. Haryana won the overall title.
- Olympic Champion Abhinav Bindra won Air Rifle Silver in 4th Asian Airgun Shooting Championship
- India's Rohan Bopanna and Pakistan's Aisam-ul-Haq Qureshi won the Stockholm Open men's doubles title.

== November ==
- Anirban Lahiri became the first Indian golfer to shoot a spectacular round of 12-under 60 on home soil.
- Rohan Bopanna and Aisam-ul-Haq Qureshi won their first ever ATP Masters tournament, Paris Masters.
- Karnataka emerged the overall champion of the 65th National aquatics meet which concluded on 20 November 2011 in Ranchi. Aaron D'Souza and Richa Mishra of Police were crowned the best swimmers of the meet. Both won five individual gold medals and broke three records. Talasha Prabhu and Anshul Kothari emerged as fastest swimmers.
- Gagan Narang won 50m Rifle 3 Position Men's Event at the 55th National Shooting Championships. Sushil Ghaley won gold in the 50m rifle prone event.

== December ==
- Belgium defeated India 4-3 in the final of the Champions Challenge hockey tournament in Johannesburg. Sandeep Singh finished the tournament with seven goals, all through penalty corners, and won the Player of the Tournament award.
- India won its 6th SAFF Championship title against the Afghanistan. India's star striker Sunil Chhetri won all the individual awards in the tournament.
- Indian Grandmaster Abhijeet Gupta won the London Chess Classic's Open Section.
- Saina Nehwal of India was defeated by first seed Wang Yihan in the women's singles final of the World Super Series badminton championship in China. Saina is the first ever Indian to enter the singles final of the World Super Series.
- Indian Striker Sunil Chhetri voted Player of the Year by the All India Football Federation.
- Kerala won Men's & Women's Title in the 10th All-India Volleyball Tournament.
