= Rhys Walker =

English badminton player (born 1994)

Personal information
- Born: 26 January 1994 (age 32) Nuneaton, Warwickshire, England
- Height: 1.75 m (5 ft 9 in)

Sport
- Country: England
- Sport: Badminton
- Handedness: Right
- Coached by: Steve Butler

Men's Singles
- Highest ranking: 113 (19 Nov 2015)
- Current ranking: 147 (25 Aug 2016)
- BWF profile
Medal record
Men's badminton
Representing England
European Mixed Team Championships
Silver medal – second place	2015 Leuven	Mixed team
European Men's Team Championships
Silver medal – second place	2014 Basel	Men's team
Bronze medal – third place	2016 Kazan	Men's team
Commonwealth Youth Games
Bronze medal – third place	2011 Douglas	Boys' singles
European Junior Championships
Bronze medal – third place	2013 Ankara	Boys' singles

Rhys Walker (born 26 January 1994) is a badminton player from England. He started paying badminton at age 8, then in 2013, he won bronze medal at the European Junior Badminton Championships in men's singles event.

== Achievements ==
=== Commonwealth Youth Games ===
Boys' singles
Year	Venue	Opponent	Score	Result
2011	National Sports Centre, Douglas, Isle of Man	(England) Tom Wolfenden	21–14, 21–18	Bronze

=== European Junior Championships ===
Boys' singles
Year	Venue	Opponent	Score	Result
2013	ASKI Sport Hall, Ankara, Turkey	(Netherlands) Mark Caljouw	20–22, 19–21	Bronze

=== BWF International Challenge/Series ===
Men's singles
Year	Tournament	Opponent	Score	Result
2015	Kharkiv International	(Sweden) Henri Hurskainen	9–21, 15–21	(silver) Runner-up

Men's doubles

Year	Tournament	Opponent	Partner	Score	Result
2013	Cyprus International	(England) Sam Parsons	(Wales) Joe Morgan (Wales) Nic Strange	22–24, 21–19, 14–21	(silver) Runner-up

BWF International Challenge tournament
BWF International Series tournament
BWF Future Series tournament
