= Lee Meng Yean =

Malaysian badminton player

Lee Meng Yean 李明晏
Personal information
- Born: 30 March 1994 (age 32) Malacca, Malaysia
- Years active: 2009 - 2021
- Height: 1.65 m (5 ft 5 in)
- Weight: 55 kg (121 lb)

Sport
- Country: Malaysia
- Sport: Badminton
- Handedness: Right

Women's & mixed doubles
- Highest ranking: 10 (WD with Chow Mei Kuan) (2 February 2021); 79 (XD with Ong Jian Guo) (25 September 2014)
- BWF profile
Medal record
Women's badminton
Representing Malaysia
Asia Team Championships
Bronze medal – third place	2020 Manila	Women's team
SEA Games
Silver medal – second place	2017 Kuala Lumpur	Women's team
Bronze medal – third place	2019 Philippines	Women's doubles
Bronze medal – third place	2019 Philippines	Women's team
Summer Universiade
Bronze medal – third place	2013 Kazan	Women's doubles
World Junior Championships
Gold medal – first place	2011 Taipei	Mixed team
Bronze medal – third place	2012 Chiba	Girls' doubles
Commonwealth Youth Games
Gold medal – first place	2011 Douglas	Girls' doubles
Bronze medal – third place	2011 Douglas	Mixed doubles
Asian Junior Championships
Silver medal – second place	2010 Kuala Lumpur	Mixed team
Silver medal – second place	2011 Lucknow	Girls' doubles
Silver medal – second place	2011 Lucknow	Mixed team
Bronze medal – third place	2012 Gimcheon	Girls' doubles
Bronze medal – third place	2012 Gimcheon	Mixed team

Lee Meng Yean (born 30 March 1994) is a Malaysian badminton player. Together with Chow Mei Kuan, she won the 2018 Syed Modi International and achieved a career-high ranking of 10 in women's doubles.

== Career ==
She was the 2011 Asian Junior Badminton Championships silver medalist. In 2013, she won a bronze medal at the BWF World Junior Championships and the Summer Universiade. In 2018, they were runners-up at the 2018 Russian Open. In 2019, they lost in the 2019 India Open final to future Olympic gold medalists Greysia Polii and Apriyani Rahayu.

In the same year, she won a bronze medal at the SEA Games. They competed in the 2020 Summer Olympics but lost in the group stage. In 2022, she was appointed as the coach for women's doubles by the Badminton Association of Malaysia.

== Achievements ==
=== SEA Games ===
Women's doubles
Year	Venue	Partner	Opponent	Score	Result
2019	Muntinlupa Sports Complex; Metro Manila, Philippines	(Malaysia) Chow Mei Kuan	(Thailand) Chayanit Chaladchalam (Thailand) Phataimas Muenwong	20–22, 11–21	Bronze

=== Summer Universiade ===
Women's doubles
Year	Venue	Partner	Opponent	Score	Result
2013	Tennis Academy; Kazan, Russia	(Malaysia) Chow Mei Kuan	(South Korea) Jang Ye-na (South Korea) Kim So-young	17–21, 9–21	Bronze

=== World Junior Championships ===
Girls' doubles
Year	Venue	Partner	Opponent	Score	Result
2012	Chiba Port Arena; Chiba, Japan	(Malaysia) Chow Mei Kuan	(South Korea) Lee So-hee (South Korea) Shin Seung-chan	6–21, 12–21	Bronze

=== Commonwealth Youth Games ===
Girls' doubles
Year	Venue	Partner	Opponent	Score	Result
2011	National Sports Centre; Douglas, Isle of Man	(Malaysia) Chow Mei Kuan	(Malaysia) Soniia Cheah Su Ya (Malaysia) Yang Li Lian	21–17, 21–8	Gold

Mixed doubles
Year	Venue	Partner	Opponent	Score	Result
2011	National Sports Centre; Douglas, Isle of Man	(Malaysia) Nelson Heg	(England) Ryan McCarthy (England) Emily Westwood	21–14, 21–10	Bronze

=== Asian Junior Championships ===
Girls' doubles
Year	Venue	Partner	Opponent	Score	Result
2011	Babu Banarasi Das Indoor Stadium; Lucknow, India	(Malaysia) Chow Mei Kuan	(Indonesia) Suci Rizki Andini (Indonesia) Tiara Rosalia Nuraidah	18–21, 21–16, 12–21	Silver
2012	Gimcheon Indoor Stadium; Gimcheon, South Korea	(Malaysia) Chow Mei Kuan	(South Korea) Lee So-hee (South Korea) Shin Seung-chan	14–21, 14–21	Bronze

=== BWF World Tour (1 title, 2 runners-up) ===
The BWF World Tour, which was announced on 19 March 2017 and implemented in 2018, is a series of elite badminton tournaments sanctioned by the Badminton World Federation (BWF). The BWF World Tour is divided into levels of World Tour Finals, Super 1000, Super 750, Super 500, Super 300 (part of the HSBC World Tour), and the BWF Tour Super 100.

Women's doubles
Year	Tournament	Level	Partner	Opponent	Score	Result
2018	Russian Open	Super 100	(Malaysia) Chow Mei Kuan	(Japan) Chisato Hoshi (Japan) Kie Nakanishi	11–21, 18–21	(silver) Runner-up
2018	Syed Modi International	Super 300	(Malaysia) Chow Mei Kuan	(India) Ashwini Ponnappa (India) N. Sikki Reddy	21–15, 21–13	(gold) Winner
2019	India Open	Super 500	(Malaysia) Chow Mei Kuan	(Indonesia) Greysia Polii (Indonesia) Apriyani Rahayu	11–21, 23–25	(silver) Runner-up

=== BWF International Challenge/Series (2 titles, 4 runners-up) ===
Women's doubles
Year	Tournament	Partner	Opponent	Score	Result
2012	Finnish Open	(Malaysia) Chow Mei Kuan	(Canada) Alex Bruce (Canada) Michelle Li	19–21, 21–12, 16–21	(silver) Runner-up
2012	Malaysia International	(Malaysia) Chow Mei Kuan	(Indonesia) Ririn Amelia (Indonesia) Melvira Oklamona	21–13, 23–21	(gold) Winner
2013	Austrian International	(Malaysia) Chow Mei Kuan	(Japan) Misato Aratama (Japan) Megumi Taruno	14–21, 20–22	(silver) Runner-up
2015	Bangladesh International	(Malaysia) Lim Yin Loo	(Thailand) Chaladchalam Chayanit (Thailand) Phataimas Muenwong	15–21, 19–21	(silver) Runner-up
2016	Polish Open	(Malaysia) Chow Mei Kuan	(Thailand) Puttita Supajirakul (Thailand) Sapsiree Taerattanachai	7–21, 17–21	(silver) Runner-up
2016	Malaysia International	(Malaysia) Chow Mei Kuan	(China) Jiang Binbin (China) Tang Pingyang	21–17, 17–21, 21–15	(gold) Winner

BWF International Challenge tournament
BWF International Series tournament
BWF Future Series tournament
