= Yang Li Lian =

Malaysian badminton player

Yang Li Lian 翁丽莲
Personal information
- Born: 26 January 1993 (age 33) Selangor, Malaysia
- Height: 1.70 m (5 ft 7 in)
- Weight: 57 kg (126 lb)

Sport
- Country: Malaysia
- Sport: Badminton

Women's singles & doubles
- Highest ranking: 54 (WS 12 February 2015); 106 (WD 1 December 2011); 108 (XD 22 September 2016)
- BWF profile
Medal record
Women's badminton
Representing Malaysia
Southeast Asian Games
Bronze medal – third place	2011 Jakarta	Women's team
Summer Universiade
Bronze medal – third place	2017 Taipei	Women's singles
Bronze medal – third place	2017 Taipei	Mixed team
World Junior Championships
Gold medal – first place	2011 Taipei	Mixed team
Silver medal – second place	2009 Alor Setar	Mixed team
Bronze medal – third place	2010 Guadalajara	Mixed team
Commonwealth Youth Games
Silver medal – second place	2011 Douglas	Girls' doubles
Asia Junior Championships
Gold medal – first place	2009 Kuala Lumpur	Mixed team
Silver medal – second place	2011 Lucknow	Mixed team
Silver medal – second place	2010 Kuala Lumpur	Mixed team
Bronze medal – third place	2010 Kuala Lumpur	Girls' doubles

Yang Li Lian (born 26 January 1993) is a Malaysian badminton player. In 2014, she competed in badminton at the 2014 Asian Games in Incheon, South Korea.

== Career ==
In 2010, she won a bronze medal at the Asian Junior Championships in the girls' doubles event, partnering with Sonia Cheah Su Ya. In 2013, she competed at the Summer Universiade in Kazan, Russia. In 2014, she became the runner-up at the Iran Fajr International tournament in the women's singles event after being defeated by her compatriot Tee Jing Yi. She also won the 2015 Bahrain International Series in the women's singles and mixed doubles event, and the 2017 Iceland International in the women's singles and doubles events. In January 2015, Li Lian announced her retirement from the Badminton Association of Malaysia in pursuit of her further education. Li Lian subsequently graduated from the University of Nottingham, United Kingdom with a first-class honours in Mathematics and Economics.

== Achievements ==
=== Summer Universiade ===
Women's singles
Year	Venue	Opponent	Score	Result
2017	Taipei Gymnasium; Taipei, Taiwan	(South Korea) Lee Jang-mi	17–21, 15–21	Bronze

=== Commonwealth Youth Games ===
Girls' doubles
Year	Venue	Partner	Opponent	Score	Result
2011	National Sports Centre; Douglas, Isle of Man	(Malaysia) Soniia Cheah Su Ya	(Malaysia) Chow Mei Kuan (Malaysia) Lee Meng Yean	17–21, 8–21	Silver

=== Asian Junior Championships ===
Girls' doubles
Year	Venue	Partner	Opponent	Score	Result
2010	Stadium Juara; Kuala Lumpur, Malaysia	(Malaysia) Sonia Cheah Su Ya	(China) Xia Huan (China) Tang Jinhua	11–21, 13–21	Bronze

=== BWF International Challenge/Series (5 titles, 1 runner-up) ===
Women's singles
Year	Tournament	Opponent	Score	Result
2017	Iceland International	(Malaysia) Lyddia Cheah	21–8, 21–11	(gold) Winner
2015	Bahrain International	(India) Saili Rane	21–19, 21–17	(gold) Winner
2014	Iran Fajr International	(Malaysia) Tee Jing Yi	10–21, 15–21	(silver) Runner-up

Women's doubles
Year	Tournament	Partner	Opponent	Score	Result
2018	Irish Open	(England) Emily Westwood	(England) Jessica Hopton (England) Victoria Williams	21–15, 19–21, 21–19	(gold) Winner
2017	Iceland International	(Malaysia) Lyddia Cheah	(England) Grace King (England) Hope Warner	21–6, 21–16	(gold) Winner

Mixed doubles
Year	Tournament	Partner	Opponent	Score	Result
2015	Bahrain International	(Malaysia) Tan Yip Jiun	(Uzbekistan) Artyom Savatyugin (Belarus) Alesia Zaitsava	21–17, 21–10	(gold) Winner

BWF International Challenge tournament
BWF International Series tournament
BWF Future Series tournament
