= Chow Mei Kuan =

Malaysian badminton player

Chow Mei Kuan 邹美君
Personal information
- Born: 23 December 1994 (age 31) Cheras, Kuala Lumpur, Malaysia
- Years active: 2012–2021
- Height: 1.61 m (5 ft 3 in)
- Weight: 50 kg (110 lb)

Sport
- Country: Malaysia
- Sport: Badminton
- Handedness: Right
- Retired: 16 August 2021

Women's & mixed doubles
- Highest ranking: 10 (WD 2 February 2021); 38 (XD 27 August 2015)
- BWF profile
Medal record
Women's badminton
Representing Malaysia
Commonwealth Games
Gold medal – first place	2018 Gold Coast	Women's doubles
Silver medal – second place	2018 Gold Coast	Mixed team
Asia Team Championships
Bronze medal – third place	2020 Manila	Women's team
SEA Games
Silver medal – second place	2017 Kuala Lumpur	Women's team
Bronze medal – third place	2019 Philippines	Women's doubles
Bronze medal – third place	2019 Philippines	Women's team
Summer Universiade
Bronze medal – third place	2013 Kazan	Women's doubles
World Junior Championships
Gold medal – first place	2011 Taipei	Mixed team
Bronze medal – third place	2011 Taipei	Mixed doubles
Bronze medal – third place	2012 Chiba	Girls' doubles
Commonwealth Youth Games
Gold medal – first place	2011 Douglas	Girls' doubles
Gold medal – first place	2011 Douglas	Mixed doubles
Asian Junior Championships
Silver medal – second place	2010 Kuala Lumpur	Mixed team
Silver medal – second place	2011 Lucknow	Girls' doubles
Silver medal – second place	2011 Lucknow	Mixed team
Bronze medal – third place	2012 Gimcheon	Girls' doubles
Bronze medal – third place	2012 Gimcheon	Mixed team

Chow Mei Kuan

Chinese name
- Traditional Chinese: 鄒美君
Transcriptions
Standard Mandarin
- Hanyu Pinyin: Zōu Měi Jūn
Hakka
- Pha̍k-fa-sṳ: Tseû Mûi-kiûn
Yue: Cantonese
- Jyutping: Zau1 Mei5 Gwan1
Southern Min
- Hokkien POJ: Chau Bí-kun
- Tâi-lô: Tsau Bí-kun

Chow Mei Kuan (Chinese: 鄒美君; born 23 December 1994) is a Malaysian retired badminton player. She started playing badminton at the age of 7 in her primary school. Chow made a debut in the international senior tournament in 2012. She won gold medals at the 2011 Commonwealth Youth Games in the girls' and mixed doubles event. Chow competed at the 2018 Commonwealth Games in Gold Coast and won the women's doubles event with Vivian Hoo Kah Mun.

== Career ==
Chow competed at the 2020 Tokyo Summer Olympics in the women's doubles partnering Lee Meng Yean, but the duo were eliminated in the group stage.

Chow gave her resignation letter to Badminton Association of Malaysia on 16 August 2021, and effectively left the team on 15 September 2021.

== Achievements ==
=== Commonwealth Games ===
Women's doubles
Year	Venue	Partner	Opponent	Score	Result
2018	Carrara Sports and Leisure Centre; Gold Coast, Australia	(Malaysia) Vivian Hoo	(England) Lauren Smith (England) Sarah Walker	21–12, 21–12	Gold

=== SEA Games ===
Women's doubles
Year	Venue	Partner	Opponent	Score	Result
2019	Muntinlupa Sports Complex; Metro Manila, Philippines	(Malaysia) Lee Meng Yean	(Thailand) Chayanit Chaladchalam (Thailand) Phataimas Muenwong	20–22, 11–21	Bronze

=== Summer Universiade ===
Women's doubles
Year	Venue	Partner	Opponent	Score	Result
2013	Tennis Academy; Kazan, Russia	(Malaysia) Lee Meng Yean	(South Korea) Jang Ye-na (South Korea) Kim So-young	17–21, 9–21	Bronze

=== World Junior Championships ===
Girls' doubles
Year	Venue	Partner	Opponent	Score	Result
2012	Chiba Port Arena; Chiba, Japan	(Malaysia) Lee Meng Yean	(South Korea) Lee So-hee (South Korea) Shin Seung-chan	6–21, 12–21	Bronze

Mixed doubles
Year	Venue	Partner	Opponent	Score	Result
2011	Taoyuan Arena; Taoyuan City, Taipei, Taiwan	(Malaysia) Nelson Heg	(Indonesia) Ronald Alexander (Indonesia) Tiara Rosalia Nuraidah	17–21, 22–20, 16–21	Bronze

=== Commonwealth Youth Games ===
Girls' doubles
Year	Venue	Partner	Opponent	Score	Result
2011	National Sports Centre, Douglas, Isle of Man	(Malaysia) Lee Meng Yean	(Malaysia) Soniia Cheah Su Ya (Malaysia) Yang Li Lian	21–17, 21–8	Gold

Mixed doubles
Year	Venue	Partner	Opponent	Score	Result
2011	National Sports Centre, Douglas, Isle of Man	(Malaysia) Teo Ee Yi	(India) Srikanth Kidambi (India) K. Maneesha	18–21, 21–16, 21–8	Gold

=== Asian Junior Championships ===
Girls' doubles
Year	Venue	Partner	Opponent	Score	Result
2011	Babu Banarasi Das Indoor Stadium; Lucknow, India	(Malaysia) Lee Meng Yean	(Indonesia) Suci Rizki Andini (Indonesia) Tiara Rosalia Nuraidah	18–21, 21–16, 12–21	Silver
2012	Gimcheon Indoor Stadium; Gimcheon, South Korea	(Malaysia) Lee Meng Yean	(South Korea) Lee So-hee (South Korea) Shin Seung-chan	14–21, 14–21	Bronze

=== BWF World Tour ===
The BWF World Tour, which was announced on 19 March 2017 and implemented in 2018, is a series of elite badminton tournaments sanctioned by the Badminton World Federation (BWF). The BWF World Tour is divided into levels of World Tour Finals, Super 1000, Super 750, Super 500, Super 300 (part of the HSBC World Tour), and the BWF Tour Super 100.

Women's doubles
Year	Tournament	Level	Partner	Opponent	Score	Result
2018	Russian Open	Super 100	(Malaysia) Lee Meng Yean	(Japan) Chisato Hoshi (Japan) Kie Nakanishi	11–21, 18–21	(silver) Runner-up
2018	Syed Modi International	Super 300	(Malaysia) Lee Meng Yean	(India) Ashwini Ponnappa (India) N. Sikki Reddy	21–15, 21–13	(gold) Winner
2019	India Open	Super 500	(Malaysia) Lee Meng Yean	(Indonesia) Greysia Polii (Indonesia) Apriyani Rahayu	11–21, 23–25	(silver) Runner-up

=== BWF International Challenge/Series ===
Women's doubles
Year	Tournament	Partner	Opponent	Score	Result
2012	Finnish Open	(Malaysia) Lee Meng Yean	(Canada) Alex Bruce (Canada) Michelle Li	19–21, 21–12, 16–21	(silver) Runner-up
2012	Malaysia International	(Malaysia) Lee Meng Yean	(Indonesia) Ririn Amelia (Indonesia) Melvira Oklamona	21–13, 23–21	(gold) Winner
2013	Austrian International	(Malaysia) Lee Meng Yean	(Japan) Misato Aratama (Japan) Megumi Taruno	14–21, 20–22	(silver) Runner-up
2016	Polish Open	(Malaysia) Lee Meng Yean	(Thailand) Puttita Supajirakul (Thailand) Sapsiree Taerattanachai	7–21, 17–21	(silver) Runner-up
2016	Malaysia International	(Malaysia) Lee Meng Yean	(China) Jiang Binbin (China) Tang Pingyang	21–17, 17–21, 21–15	(gold) Winner
2018	Vietnam International	(Malaysia) Vivian Hoo	(South Korea) Baek Ha-na (South Korea) Lee Yu-rim	19–21, 21–17, 17–21	(silver) Runner-up

Mixed doubles
Year	Tournament	Partner	Opponent	Score	Result
2012	French International	(Malaysia) Nelson Heg	(Germany) Peter Käsbauer (Germany) Johanna Goliszewski	12–21, 11–21	(silver) Runner-up
2012	Smiling Fish International	(Malaysia) Tan Wee Gieen	(Malaysia) Wong Fai Yin (Malaysia) Shevon Jemie Lai	13–21, 21–23	(silver) Runner-up
2015	Polish International	(Malaysia) Wong Fai Yin	(Denmark) Kasper Antonsen (Denmark) Amanda Madsen	19–21, 12–21	(silver) Runner-up

BWF International Challenge tournament
BWF International Series tournament
BWF Future Series tournament
