= Papua New Guinea at the 2011 Commonwealth Youth Games =

- CGF code: PNG
- CGA: Papua New Guinea Olympic Committee & Commonwealth Games Association

in Isle of Man
- Competitors: 7 in 3 sports
- Medals Ranked 27th: Gold 0 Silver 0 Bronze 0 Total 0

Commonwealth Youth Games appearances
- 2000; 2004; 2008; 2011; 2015; 2017; 2023

Papua New Guinea competed at the 2011 Commonwealth Youth Games in Isle of Man from 7 to 13 September 2011.The Papua New Guinea Olympic Committee & Commonwealth Games Association selected 7 competitors. None of them won any medals.
