= Soniia Cheah Su Ya =

Malaysian badminton player (born 1993)

Soniia Cheah Su Ya 谢抒芽
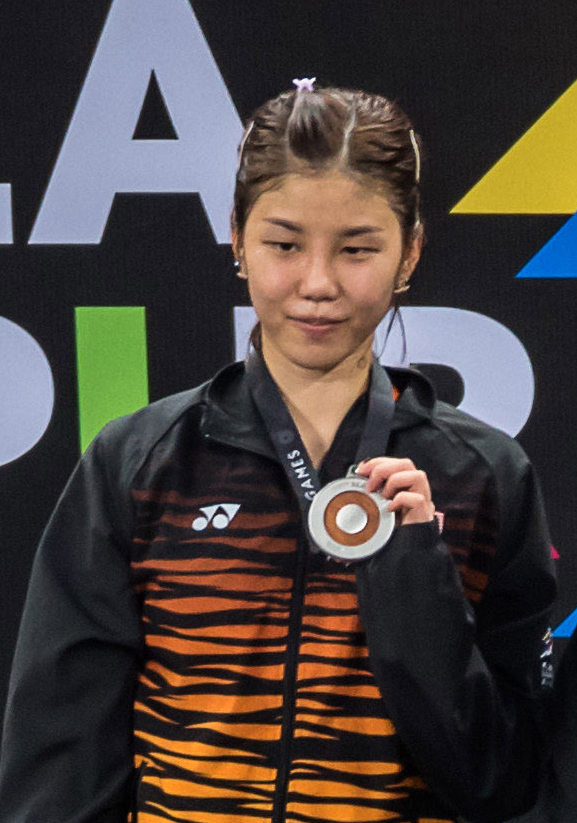
- Cheah at the 2017 Southeast Asian Games.

Personal information
- Born: 謝淑雅; 19 June 1993 (age 33) Kuala Lumpur, Malaysia
- Height: 1.75 m (5 ft 9 in)
- Weight: 65 kg (143 lb)

Sport
- Country: Malaysia
- Sport: Badminton
- Handedness: Right
- Retired: 13 December 2022

Women's singles
- Highest ranking: 23 (13 July 2017)
- BWF profile
Medal record
Women's badminton
Representing Malaysia
Commonwealth Games
Silver medal – second place	2018 Gold Coast	Mixed team
Asia Team Championships
Bronze medal – third place	2020 Manila	Women's team
SEA Games
Silver medal – second place	2017 Kuala Lumpur	Women's singles
Silver medal – second place	2017 Kuala Lumpur	Women's team
Bronze medal – third place	2011 Jakarta–Palembang	Women's team
Bronze medal – third place	2019 Philippines	Women's team
World Junior Championships
Gold medal – first place	2011 Taipei	Mixed team
Silver medal – second place	2009 Alor Setar	Mixed team
Bronze medal – third place	2010 Guadalajara	Mixed team
Commonwealth Youth Games
Silver medal – second place	2011 Douglas	Girls' singles
Silver medal – second place	2011 Douglas	Girls' doubles
Asian Junior Championships
Gold medal – first place	2009 Kuala Lumpur	Mixed team
Silver medal – second place	2010 Kuala Lumpur	Mixed team
Silver medal – second place	2011 Lucknow	Mixed team
Bronze medal – third place	2010 Kuala Lumpur	Girls' doubles

Soniia Cheah Su Ya
- Traditional Chinese: 謝抒芽
- Simplified Chinese: 谢抒芽
Transcriptions
Standard Mandarin
- Hanyu Pinyin: Xiè Shūyá

Soniia Cheah Su Ya (Chinese: 謝抒芽), born 19 June 1993) is a retired Malaysian badminton player. She is the younger sister of Lyddia Cheah who is also a professional badminton player.

== Career ==
In her junior career, she represented Malaysia at the 2009, 2010, and 2011 Asian Junior Championships, World Junior Championships, 2010 Summer Youth Olympics, and 2011 Commonwealth Youth Games.

She won her first international title at the 2016 Belgian International tournament. At the Southeast Asian Games, she won the mixed team bronze medal in 2011, also the silver medals in 2017 in the women's singles and team event. Cheah competed at the 2018 Commonwealth Games.

She founded a badminton academy, Sunheart Badminton with her sister, Lyddia in April 2022. On 13 December 2022, she announced her retirement from badminton due to the pain from the relapse of her bone spur injury which she has been enduring since 2013.

== Achievements ==
=== SEA Games ===
Women's singles
Year	Venue	Opponent	Score	Result
2017	Axiata Arena, Kuala Lumpur, Malaysia	(Malaysia) Goh Jin Wei	11–21, 10–21	Silver

=== Commonwealth Youth Games ===
Girls' singles
Year	Venue	Opponent	Score	Result
2011	National Sports Centre, Douglas, Isle of Man	(India) P. V. Sindhu	20–22, 8–21	Silver

Girls' doubles
Year	Venue	Partner	Opponent	Score	Result
2011	National Sports Centre, Douglas, Isle of Man	(Malaysia) Yang Li Lian	(Malaysia) Chow Mei Kuan (Malaysia) Lee Meng Yean	17–21, 8–21	Silver

=== Asian Junior Championships ===
Girls' doubles
Year	Venue	Partner	Opponent	Score	Result
2010	Stadium Juara, Kuala Lumpur, Malaysia	(Malaysia) Yang Li Lian	(China) Tang Jinhua (China) Xia Huan	11–21, 13–21	Bronze

=== BWF Grand Prix ===
The BWF Grand Prix had two levels, the Grand Prix and Grand Prix Gold. It was a series of badminton tournaments sanctioned by the Badminton World Federation (BWF) and played between 2007 and 2017.

Women's singles
Year	Tournament	Opponent	Score	Result
2017	Russian Open	(Russia) Evgeniya Kosetskaya	9–11, 11–5, 5–11, 11–5, 4–11	(silver) Runner-up

BWF Grand Prix Gold tournament
BWF Grand Prix tournament

=== BWF International Challenge/Series ===
Women's singles
Year	Tournament	Opponent	Score	Result
2012	Dutch International	(Netherlands) Yao Jie	21–19, 9–21, 12–21	(silver) Runner-up
2016	Belgian International	(Denmark) Sofie Holmboe Dahl	21–11, 16–21, 21–16	(gold) Winner
2016	Tata Open India International	(India) Pardeshi Shreyanshi	11–3, 6–11, 11–6, 11–7	(gold) Winner

BWF International Challenge tournament
BWF International Series tournament
