= Tom Wolfenden =

English badminton player (born 1994)

Personal information
- Born: 23 February 1994 (age 32) Liverpool, England
- Years active: 2011
- Height: 1.93 m (6 ft 4 in)

Sport
- Country: England
- Sport: Badminton
- Handedness: Right

Men's doubles
- Highest ranking: 34 (25 January 2018)
- BWF profile
Medal record
Men's badminton
Representing England
European Men's Team Championships
Silver medal – second place	2018 Kazan	Men's team
Silver medal – second place	2014 Basel	Men's team
Bronze medal – third place	2016 Kazan	Men's team
Commonwealth Youth Games
Silver medal – second place	2011 Douglas	Boys' doubles

Tom Wolfenden (born 23 February 1994) is a badminton player from England. He started playing badminton at aged 6, he won U-19 England national badminton championships five times, and became the England's Young Player of the year 2012–13.

== Achievements ==
=== Commonwealth Youth Games ===
Boys' doubles
Year	Venue	Partner	Opponent	Score	Result
2011	National Sports Centre; Douglas, Isle of Man	(England) Ryan McCarthy	(Malaysia) Nelson Heg (Malaysia) Teo Ee Yi	22–24, 16–21	Silver

=== BWF Grand Prix ===
The BWF Grand Prix has two level such as Grand Prix and Grand Prix Gold. It is a series of badminton tournaments, sanctioned by Badminton World Federation (BWF) since 2007.

Men's doubles
Year	Tournament	Partner	Opponent	Score	Result
2017	Canada Open	(England) Peter Briggs	(South Korea) Kim Won-ho (South Korea) Seo Seung-jae	22–20, 16–21, 21–19	(gold) Winner

BWF Grand Prix Gold tournament
BWF Grand Prix tournament

=== BWF International Challenge/Series ===
Men's doubles
Year	Tournament	Partner	Opponent	Score	Result
2015	Austrian International	(England) Peter Briggs	(Indonesia) Fajar Alfian (Indonesia) Muhammad Rian Ardianto	21–23, 21–18, 19–21	(silver) Runner-up
2015	Portugal International	(England) Peter Briggs	(Scotland) Martin Campbell (Scotland) Patrick MacHugh	21–17, 22–20	(gold) Winner
2015	Croatian International	(England) Peter Briggs	(Malaysia) Lim Ming Chuen (Malaysia) Ong Wei Khoon	21–19, 21–10	(gold) Winner
2015	Swiss International	(England) Peter Briggs	(Malaysia) Koo Kien Keat (Malaysia) Tan Boon Heong	21–18, 16–21, 16–21	(silver) Runner-up
2017	Belgian International	(England) Peter Briggs	(Denmark) Frederik Colberg (Denmark) Rasmus Fladberg	21–16, 13–21, 6–21	(silver) Runner-up

BWF International Challenge tournament
BWF International Series tournament
BWF Future Series tournament
