= Northern Ireland at the 2011 Commonwealth Youth Games =

- CGF code: NIR
- CGA: Commonwealth Games Council for Northern Ireland

in Isle of Man
- Competitors: 19 in 6 sports
- Medals Ranked 10th: Gold 3 Silver 2 Bronze 3 Total 8

Commonwealth Youth Games appearances
- 2000; 2004; 2008; 2011; 2015; 2017; 2023

Northern Ireland competed at the 2011 Commonwealth Youth Games in Isle of Man from 7 to 13 September 2011.The Commonwealth Games Council for Northern Ireland selected 4 competitors. Northern Ireland won three gold, two silver and three bronze medals and finished tenth overall.
