= Badminton at the 2011 Commonwealth Youth Games =

Tournament details
- Dates: 9–11 September
- Edition: 3rd
- Competitors: 86 from 24 nations
- Venue: National Sports Centre
- Location: Douglas

Badminton was one of the seven events of 2011 Commonwealth Youth Games staged in the Isle of Man. There were five contests in the sport: boys' singles, boys' doubles, girls' singles, girls' doubles, and mixed doubles. Each Commonwealth Games Association could send up to two athletes (or two pairs) per event, for a maximum of four athletes per sex. The age of participating athletes was limited to the 14–18 years, so that only those born in 1993, 1994, 1995, 1996 or 1997 were eligible to take part.

== Events ==
Event	Gold	Silver	Bronze
Boys' singles	Zulfadli Zulkiffli; Malaysia (MAS)	Sameer Verma; India (IND)	Rhys Walker; England (ENG)
Girls' singles	P. V. Sindhu; India (IND)	Sonia Cheah Su Ya; Malaysia (MAS)	Kirsty Gilmour; Scotland (SCO)
Boys' doubles	Nelson Heg Wei Keat; Teo Ee Yi; Malaysia (MAS)	Ryan McCarthy; Tom Wolfenden; England (ENG)	Srikanth Kidambi; T. Hema Nagendra Babu; India (IND)
Girls' doubles	Chow Mei Kuan; Lee Meng Yean; Malaysia (MAS)	Sonia Cheah Su Ya; Yang Li Lian; Malaysia (MAS)	Achininimeshika Rathnasiri Kapuru Mudiyanselage; Upuli Samanthika; Sri Lanka (SRI)
Mixed doubles	Teo Ee Yi; Chow Mei Kuan; Malaysia (MAS)	Srikanth Kidambi; Maneesha Kukkapalli; India (IND)	Nelson Heg Wei Keat; Lee Meng Yean; Malaysia (MAS)

== Results ==
=== Boys' singles ===
Semifinal
(Malaysia) Zulfadli Zulkiffli	21	21
(England) Rhys Walker	12	10
(England) Tom Wolfenden	9	15
(India) Sameer Verma	21	21

Final
(Malaysia) Zulfadli Zulkiffli	21	17	21
(India) Sameer Verma	16	21	15
Third place
(England) Rhys Walker	21	21
(England) Tom Wolfenden	14	18

=== Girls' singles ===
Semifinal
(India) P. V. Sindhu	21	21
(Malaysia) Yang Li Lian	12	10
(Malaysia) Soniia Cheah Su Ya	21	10	21
(Scotland) Kirsty Gilmour	19	21	11

Final
(India) P. V. Sindhu	22	21
(Malaysia) Soniia Cheah Su Ya	20	8
Third place
(Malaysia) Yang Li Lian	16	20
(Scotland) Kirsty Gilmour	21	22

=== Boys' doubles ===
Semi-finals
(Malaysia) Nelson Heg (Malaysia) Teo Ee Yi	21	21
(Canada) Nathan Choi (Canada) Nyl Yakura	17	11
(India) T. Hema Nagendra Babu (India) Srikanth Kidambi	21	14	20
(England) Ryan McCarthy (England) Tom Wolfenden	8	21	22

Final
(Malaysia) Nelson Heg (Malaysia) Teo Ee Yi	24	21
(England) Ryan McCarthy (England) Tom Wolfenden	22	16
Third place
(Canada) Nathan Choi (Canada) Nyl Yakura	14	21	12
(India) T. Hema Nagendra Babu (India) Srikanth Kidambi	21	15	21

=== Girls' doubles ===
Semi-finals
(Malaysia) Chow Mei Kuan (Malaysia) Lee Meng Yean	21	21
(Australia) Jacqueline Guan (Australia) Gronya Somerville	7	19
(Sri Lanka) Achini Ratnasiri (Sri Lanka) Upuli Samanthika	16	20
(Malaysia) Soniia Cheah Su Ya (Malaysia) Yang Li Lian	21	22

Final
(Malaysia) Chow Mei Kuan (Malaysia) Lee Meng Yean	21	21
(Malaysia) Soniia Cheah Su Ya (Malaysia) Yang Li Lian	17	8
Third place
(Australia) Jacqueline Guan (Australia) Gronya Somerville	12	21	16
(Sri Lanka) Achini Ratnasiri (Sri Lanka) Upuli Samanthika	21	19	21

=== Mixed doubles ===
Semi-finals
(Malaysia) Teo Ee Yi (Malaysia) Chow Mei Kuan	21	21
(England) Ryan McCarthy (England) Emily Westwood	18	14
(Malaysia) Nelson Heg (Malaysia) Lee Meng Yean	18	19
(India) Srikanth Kidambi (India) K. Maneesha	21	21

Final
(Malaysia) Teo Ee Yi (Malaysia) Chow Mei Kuan	18	21	21
(India) Srikanth Kidambi (India) K. Maneesha	21	16	8
Third place
(England) Ryan McCarthy (England) Emily Westwood	14	10
(Malaysia) Nelson Heg (Malaysia) Lee Meng Yean	21	21
