= South Africa at the 2011 Commonwealth Youth Games =

- CGF code: RSA

in Isle of Man
- Competitors: 53 in 7 sports
- Medals Ranked 3rd: Gold 8 Silver 7 Bronze 15 Total 30

Commonwealth Youth Games appearances
- 2000; 2004; 2008; 2011; 2015; 2017; 2023

South Africa participated at the 2011 Commonwealth Youth Games in Isle of Man from 7 to 13 September 2011. The South African athletes competed in all the seven sports of the program.
