= Scotland at the 2011 Commonwealth Youth Games =

- CGF code: SCO
- CGA: Commonwealth Games Scotland

in Isle of Man
- Competitors: 50 in 7 sports
- Medals Ranked 6th: Gold 5 Silver 6 Bronze 11 Total 22

Commonwealth Youth Games appearances
- 2000; 2004; 2008; 2011; 2015; 2017; 2023

Scotland competed at the 2011 Commonwealth Youth Games in Isle of Man from 7 to 13 September 2011.The Commonwealth Games Scotland selected 50 competitors. Scotland won five gold medals, six silver and eleven bronze medals. 3 of their gold medals were won by swimmer Craig Benson who took a clean sweep of Breastroke titles. They finished in the sixth place overall.
