= Australia at the 2011 Commonwealth Youth Games =

- CGF code: AUS
- CGA: Australian Commonwealth Games Association

in Isle of Man
- Competitors: 77 (32 females and 45 males) in 7 sports
- Officials: 35
- Medals Ranked 2nd: Gold 29 Silver 28 Bronze 17 Total 74

Commonwealth Youth Games appearances
- 2000; 2004; 2008; 2011; 2015; 2017; 2023

Australia competed at the 2011 Commonwealth Youth Games in Isle of Man from 7 to 13 September 2011. Australian Commonwealth Games Association selected 77 contingents for seven different sports. Australia won total 74 medals (including 29 gold), and finished at the second spot in a medal table.
