= Wales at the 2011 Commonwealth Youth Games =

- CGF code: WAL
- CGA: Commonwealth Games Council for Wales

in Isle of Man
- Competitors: 32 (15 females and 17 males) in 6 sports
- Medals Ranked 5th: Gold 5 Silver 11 Bronze 10 Total 26

Commonwealth Youth Games appearances
- 2000; 2004; 2008; 2011; 2015; 2017; 2023

Wales competed at the 2011 Commonwealth Youth Games in the Isle of Man from 7 to 13 September 2011.The Commonwealth Games Council for Wales selected 32 competitors. Wales won five gold medals, eleven silver medals, and ten bronze medals. They finished in the fifth place overall.

== History ==
Wales made their Commonwealth Games debut in Hamilton in 1930 and are one of only six nations to have taken part in every Games since then. Since Wales cannot compete at the Olympic Games as a separate nation, the Commonwealth Games provides them its only opportunity to compete in a major international multi-sport event. The principality's participation in the Games is organised by the Commonwealth Games Council of Wales.

== Delegation ==
The delegation of Wales consisted of 32 competitors, of whom 15 were female and 17 were males.

== Results ==
=== Gold Medal Winners ===
Name	Sport
Ffion Price	Athletics
Angel Romaeo	Gymnastics
Ieuan Lloyd(2 medals)	Swimming
Wales	Swimming
