= 2011 Commonwealth Youth Games =

Multi-sport event on the Isle of Man

IV Commonwealth Youth Games
- Host city: Isle of Man
- Nations: 64
- Athletes: 800
- Events: 110 in 7 sports
- Opening: 7 September 2011
- Closing: 13 September 2011
- Opened by: Prince Edward, Earl of Wessex
- Main venue: National Sports Centre

The 2011 Commonwealth Youth Games, officially known as the IV Commonwealth Youth Games, and commonly known as Isle Of Man 2011, is a multi-sport event which took place from 7 to 13 September 2011 in the British Crown Dependency of the Isle of Man. As per the original quadrennial cycle, the Games were scheduled for 2012. However, the Commonwealth Games Federation at its general assembly in 2005 decided to move the Games within one year before the Summer Olympics. The Bowl Stadium at the National Sports Centre, Douglas staged the opening ceremony on 7 September 2011. The closing ceremony was held on Douglas Promenade & the Villa Marina on 13 September.

== Host city selection ==
The Isle of Man had unsuccessfully bid to host the 2008 Commonwealth Youth Games, losing to the bid of India for Pune.

== Venues ==
In October 2008 the organising committee released a provisional events programme. All events were held between September 9 and 11, 2011

- National Sports Centre, Douglas - The athletics stadium staged all the athletics events. The swimming pool staged the swimming events and the main Sports Hall staged badminton.
- The Bowl Stadium, Douglas - Rugby sevens.
- The Villa Marina, Douglas - Boxing.
- Ellan Vannin Gymnastics Club - Gymnastics (boys).
- Manx Gymnastics Centre of Excellence - Gymnastics (girls).
- The start line for the 3 cycling races will be: TT Grandstand for the Road Race & Douglas Promenade for the Criterium & Time Trial.

== Sports ==
The 2011 Commonwealth Youth Games program featured seven sports, two fewer from previous Games in Pune.

- Athletics (36)
- Badminton (5)
- Boxing (8)
- Cycling (8)
- Gymnastics (14)
- Rugby sevens (1)
- Swimming (38)

== Participating nations ==
64 Commonwealth nations competed at the 2011 Commonwealth Youth Games. Fiji was barred from the Games as it was suspended from the Commonwealth. Both Norfolk Island and Vanuatu withdrew from the competition, as both Norfolk Island competitors were injured, and the latter cited other sporting commitments, followed by Lesotho and Montserrat for similar reasons. Ghana, Nigeria and Tuvalu were scheduled to compete at the Games, however they did not appear on the start lists.

The number of athletes per country is in brackets.

- Anguilla (5)
- Antigua and Barbuda (6)
- Australia (87)
- Bahamas (8)
- Bangladesh (4)
- Barbados (13)
- Belize (4)
- Bermuda (8)
- Botswana (8)
- British Virgin Islands (5)
- Brunei (3)
- Cameroon (8)
- Canada (56)
- Cayman Islands (4)
- Cook Islands (3)
- Cyprus (11)
- Dominica (4)
- England (78)
- Falkland Islands (5)
- Gambia (4)
- Gibraltar (5)
- Grenada (4)
- Guernsey (8)
- Guyana (7)
- India (20)
- Isle of Man (33) host
- Jamaica (11)
- Jersey (7)
- Kenya (20)
- Kiribati (6)
- Malawi (3)
- Malaysia (18)
- Maldives (4)
- Malta (5)
- Mauritius (5)
- Mozambique (3)
- Namibia (8)
- Nauru (3)
- New Zealand (29)
- Niue (1)
- Northern Ireland (19)
- Pakistan (4)
- Papua New Guinea (8)
- Rwanda (4)
- Saint Helena (4)
- Saint Kitts and Nevis (3)
- Saint Lucia (5)
- Saint Vincent and the Grenadines (4)
- Samoa (3)
- Scotland (50)
- Seychelles (7)
- Sierra Leone (4)
- Singapore (6)
- Solomon Islands (4)
- South Africa (54)
- Sri Lanka (25)
- Swaziland (4)
- Tanzania (1)
- Tonga (4)
- Trinidad and Tobago (22)
- Turks and Caicos Islands (3)
- Uganda (11)
- Wales (32)
- Zambia (6)

== Schedule ==
OC	Opening ceremony	●	Event competitions	1	Event finals	CC	Closing ceremony

September	8th Thu	9th Fri	10th Sat	11th Sun	12th Mon	Events
Ceremonies	OC				CC	
Athletics		7	13	16		36
Badminton		●	●	5		5
Boxing	●	●	●	8		8
Cycling		4	2	2		8
Gymnastics		2	2	10		14
Rugby sevens			●	1		1
Swimming		12	13	13		14
Total Events		25	30	55	0	108
Cumulative total		25	55	110	110	110
September	8th Thu	9th Fri	10th Sat	11th Sun	12th Mon	Events

== Medal table ==
Country codes.

Key

List of medal-winning nations, showing the number of gold, silver, and bronze medals won
Rank	Nation	Gold	Silver	Bronze	Total
1	England (ENG)	37	24	16	77
2	Australia (AUS)	29	28	17	74
3	South Africa (RSA)	8	7	15	30
4	New Zealand (NZL)	6	6	8	20
5	Wales (WAL)	5	11	10	26
6	Scotland (SCO)	5	6	11	22
7	Kenya (KEN)	4	4	2	10
8	Malaysia (MAS)	4	2	1	7
9	India (IND)	3	3	3	9
10	Northern Ireland (NIR)	3	2	3	8
	Total	110	110	110	330
