= Athletics at the 2011 Commonwealth Youth Games =

Athletics at the IV Commonwealth Youth Games
- Dates: September
- Host city: Douglas, Isle of Man
- Venue: National Sports Centre
- Events: 34
- Records set: 11 games records

Athletics was one of the seven sports of the 2011 Commonwealth Youth Games. Held between 9 and 11 September, the events were staged at the National Sports Centre in Douglas, Isle of Man.

A total of 34 athletics events were contested, 17 for both boys and girls. Racewalking and pole vault events were scheduled for both sexes, but did not take place due to lack of entries. Over the course of the three-day tournament 11 Commonwealth Youth Games records were set or improved. Strong tailwinds affected both the sprint events and horizontal jumps.

Each Commonwealth Games Association sent up to two athletes per event, including one relay team. The age of participating athletes was limited to 16- and 17-year-olds only. This meant that for 2011 athletes must have been born in 1994 or 1995 to be eligible to take part.

England was the most successful nation in the athletics programme, winning twelve events and taking 21 medals in total. South Africa won the next most gold medals, with six, while Australia had the next highest medal tally, with 17 medals overall. Kenya also performed well, with four golds among its ten medals. Host nation Isle of Man won one bronze medal. Twenty-six nations reached the athletics medal table.

The men's 800 metres was high calibre and medallists Timothy Kitum and Nijel Amos both went on to win medals at the 2012 London Olympics. Jazmin Sawyers, the long jump and relay gold medallist in Douglas, advanced into the senior ranks three years later at the 2014 Commonwealth Games by getting the long jump silver.

== Medal summary ==
=== Boys ===
Event	Gold		Silver		Bronze	
100 metres (wind: +2.9 m/s)	Tahir Walsh; Antigua and Barbuda	10.50 w	Chijindu Ujah; England	10.52 w	Josh Clarke; Australia	10.53 w
200 metres	Tom Holligan; Scotland	21.52 w	Tahir Walsh; Antigua and Barbuda	21.66 w	Dalton Coppins; New Zealand	21.75 w
400 metres	Clovis Asong; England	47.76	Alphas Kishoyian; Kenya	48.28	George Caddick; England	48.99
800 metres	Timothy Kitum; Kenya	1:49.32 GR	Leonard Kosencha; Kenya	1:50.62	Nigel Amos; Botswana	1:51.07
1500 metres	Jonathan Sawe; Kenya	3:48.38	Vincent Mutai; Kenya	3:50.32	Robbie Farnham-Rose; England	3:51.89
3000 metres	Wiliam Sitonik; Kenya	7:57.03 GR	Patrick Mwikya; Kenya	8:00.81	Phillip Kipyeko; Uganda	8:02.33
110 metres hurdles (wind: +3.4 m/s)	Andries van der Merwe; South Africa	13.32 w	Anthony Collins; Australia	13.59 w	Jack Edwards; Australia	13.85 w
400 metres hurdles	Durgesh Kumar; India	51.76 GR	Johannes Pretorius; South Africa	53.05	Kion Joseph; Barbados	53.52
2000 metres steeplechase	Zak Seddon; England	5:41.81 GR	Zakaria Kiprotich; Uganda	5:43.93	Katleho Dyoyi; South Africa	5:56.91
4×100 metres relay	South Africa (RSA); Bradley Britz; Pieter Conradie; Johannes Pretorius; Andries van der Merwe	41.00	England (ENG); Leon Reid; Elliot Safo; Joshua Street; Chijindu Ujah	41.06	Canada (CAN); Steven Ajayi; Drelan Bramwell; Denray Jean-Jacques; Keefer Joyce	41.06
High jump	Willem van Schalkwyk; South Africa	2.03 m	Tom Henry; Australia	2.00 m	Michael Hartley; England	1.90 m
Long jump	Angus Gould; Australia	7.52 m w	Elliot Safo; England	7.41 m w	Ifeanyichukwu Otuonye; Turks and Caicos Islands	7.15 m w
Triple jump	Sithembiso Janki; South Africa	14.85 m	Jimi Tele; England	14.60 m	Gervais Tsoaoule-Mpazambe; Cameroon	13.88 m
Shot put	Navjetdeep Singh; India	18.81 m GR	Ruan Combrinck; South Africa	18.57 m	Hezekiel Romeo; Trinidad and Tobago	17.97 m
Discus throw	Gerhard de Beer; South Africa	67.44 m GR	Nicholas Percy; Scotland	62.96 m	Jan-Louw Kotze; South Africa	62.90 m
Hammer throw	Callum Brown; England	72.19 m GR	Michael Painter; England	68.64 m	Nicholas Percy; Scotland	64.96 m
Javelin throw	Morne Moolman; South Africa	81.53 m GR	Luke Cann; Australia	75.21 m	Adrian Williams; Saint Kitts and Nevis	63.02 m

=== Girls ===
Event	Gold		Silver		Bronze	
100 metres (wind: +2.4 m/s)	Sophie Papps; England	11.53 w	Caroline Morin-Houde; Canada	11.81 w	Shaina Harrison; Canada	11.81 w
200 metres (wind: +2.2 m/s)	Dina Asher-Smith; England	24.30 w	Caroline Morin-Houde; Canada	24.44 w	Chloe Lambert; Scotland	24.49 w
400 metres	Halima Nakaayi; Uganda	57.16	Siwanthi Rathnayaka; Sri Lanka	58.95	Alcindor Carinne; Mauritius	59.71
800 metres	Katie Snowden; England	2:11.20	Rochelle Kennedy; Australia	2:12.06	Vanessa Mcleod; Canada	2:13.08
1500 metres	Ffion Price; Wales	4:44.14	Sophie Linn; Australia	4:45.33	Meropi Panagiotou; Cyprus	4:47.47
3000 metres	Emelia Gorecka; England	9:14.08	Nancy Cheptegei; Uganda	9:22.70	Norah Jeruto Tanui; Kenya	9:24.02
100 metres hurdles (wind: +4.1 m/s)	Yasmin Miller; England	13.30 w	Abbie Taddeo; Australia	13.70 w	Deshaunda Morrison; Canada	13.77 w
400 metres hurdles	Tatum Shaw; Australia	60.49 GR	Hayley McLean; England	61.76	Taylor Farquhar; Canada	62.00
2000 metres steeplechase	Norah Jeruto Tanui; Kenya	6:28.10 GR	Nancy Cheptegei; Uganda	6:36.41	Lilian Chemweno; Kenya	6:41.80
4×100 metres relay	England (ENG); Dina Asher-Smith; Yasmin Miller; Sophie Papps; Jazmin Sawyers	46.19	Canada (CAN); Shaina Harrison; Alexa Hrycun; Caroline Morin-Houde; Marie-Colombe St-Pierre	46.58	Australia (AUS); Margaret Gayen; Tatum Shaw; Abbie Taddeo; Sophie Taylor	48.10
High jump	Leontia Kallenou; Cyprus	1.79 m	Jeanelle Scheper; Saint Lucia	1.76 m	Reagan Dee; Isle of Man	1.65 m
Long jump	Jazmin Sawyers; England	6.27 m w	Naa Anang; Australia	5.94 m w	Margaret Gayen; Australia	5.87 m w
Triple jump	Natalie Apikotoa; Australia	12.55 m	Greer Alsop; New Zealand	12.39 m w	Sabrina Allen; Jamaica	11.42 m
Shot put	Sophie McKinna; England	14.75 m	Taylah Sengul; Australia	14.10 m	Chei Kenneally; New Zealand	12.96 m
Discus throw	Taylah Sengul; Australia	50.71 m GR	Shadine Duquemin; Jersey	49.25 m	Navjeet Kaur Dhillon; India	45.27 m
Hammer throw	Louisa James; England	58.10 m	Kimberley Reed; Scotland	54.22 m	Mikki Genge; Australia	51.49 m
Javelin throw	Sune Wittmann; Namibia	43.25 m	Carys Mansfield; Wales	39.18 m	Shanica Yankey; Dominica	37.39 m

== Medal table ==
* Host nation (Isle of Man)

Rank	Nation	Gold	Silver	Bronze	Total
1	England	12	6	3	21
2	South Africa	6	2	2	10
3	Australia	4	8	5	17
4	Kenya	4	4	2	10
5	India	2	0	1	3
6	Uganda	1	3	1	5
7	Scotland	1	2	2	5
8	Antigua and Barbuda	1	1	0	2
8	Wales	1	1	0	2
10	Cyprus	1	0	1	2
11	Namibia	1	0	0	1
12	Canada	0	3	5	8
13	New Zealand	0	1	2	3
14	Jersey	0	1	0	1
14	Saint Lucia	0	1	0	1
14	Sri Lanka	0	1	0	1
17	Barbados	0	0	1	1
17	Botswana	0	0	1	1
17	Cameroon	0	0	1	1
17	Dominica	0	0	1	1
17	Isle of Man*	0	0	1	1
17	Jamaica	0	0	1	1
17	Mauritius	0	0	1	1
17	Saint Kitts and Nevis	0	0	1	1
17	Trinidad and Tobago	0	0	1	1
17	Turks and Caicos Islands	0	0	1	1
Totals (26 entries)		34	34	34	102
