= List of Central American and Caribbean youth bests in athletics =

Central American and Caribbean youth bests in the sport of athletics are the all-time best marks set in competition by aged 17 or younger throughout the entire calendar year of the performance and competing for a member nation of the Central American and Caribbean Athletic Confederation (CACAC). CACAC doesn't maintain an official list for such performances. All bests shown on this list are tracked by statisticians not officially sanctioned by the governing body.

== Outdoor ==
=== Boys ===
Event	Record	Athlete	Nationality	Date	Meet	Place	Age	Ref.
100 m	10.20 (+2.0 m/s)	Sachin Dennis	Jamaica	24 March 2018	ISSA/GraceKennedy Championships	Kingston, Jamaica	15 years, 133 days	
200 m	20.13 (±0.0 m/s)	Usain Bolt	Jamaica	20 July 2003	Pan American Junior Championships	Bridgetown, Barbados	16 years, 333 days	
400 m								
800 m	1:47.38	Wesley Vázquez	Puerto Rico	14 May 2011	Ponce Grand Prix	Ponce, Puerto Rico	17 years, 48 days	
1500 m								
Mile								
3000 m								
5000 m								
10,000 m								
110 m hurdles (91.4 cm)	12.96 (+1.3 m/s)	Jaheel Hyde	Jamaica	23 August 2014	Youth Olympic Games	Nanjing, China	17 years, 202 days	
110 m hurdles (99/100 cm)	13.20 (+0.6 m/s)	Dejour Russell	Jamaica	20 July 2016	World U20 Championships	Bydgoszcz, Poland	16 years, 110 days	
110 m hurdles	13.32 (+0.7 m/s)	Dejour Russell	Jamaica	24 June 2017	Jamaican Championships	Kingston, Jamaica	17 years, 84 days	
300 m hurdles (91.4 cm)								
400 m hurdles (84.0 cm)								
400 m hurdles (91.4 cm)	49.29	Jaheel Hyde	Jamaica	25 July 2014	World Junior Championships	Eugene, United States	17 years, 173 days	
2000 m steeplechase (91.0 cm)	6:10.97	Paulo Gómez González	Costa Rica	11 July 2021	NACAC U18 Championships	San José, Costa Rica	17 years, 143 days	
3000 m steeplechase	8:53.78	Osmani Calzado	Cuba	18 March 2005	Cuban Championships	Havana, Cuba	16 years, 264 days	
High jump	2.33 m	Javier Sotomayor	Cuba	19 May 1984		Havana, Cuba	16 years, 219 days	
Pole vault								
Long jump	8.28 m (+1.8 m/s)	Maykel Demetrio Massó	Cuba	28 May 2016	Barrientos Memorial	Havana, Cuba	17 years, 20 days	
Triple jump	17.41 m (+1.0 m/s)	Jordan A. Díaz	Cuba	8 June 2018		Havana, Cuba	17 years, 105 days	
Shot put (6 kg)								
Discus throw (1.5 kg)	67.05 m	Fedrick Dacres	Jamaica	6 July 2011	World Youth Championships	Lille, France	17 years, 128 days	
Discus throw (1.750 kg)	59.92 m	Ralford Mullings	Jamaica	19 July 2019	Pan American U20 Athletics Championships	San José, Costa Rica	16 years, 239 days	
Hammer throw (6 kg)								
Javelin throw								
Octathlon	6482 pts	Yordanis García	Cuba	13–14 July 2005		Marrakesh, Morocco	16 years, 235 days	
Octathlon	100m (wind) / Long jump (wind) / Shot put / 400m / 110m H (wind) / High jump / Javelin / 1000m; 11.24 / 6.86 m / 16.39 m / 51.35 / 14.11 / 1.95 m / 65.76 m / 2:54.19							
10,000 m walk (track)	39:27.10	Emiliano Barba	Mexico	30 August 2024	World U20 Championships	Lima, Peru	17 years, 160 days	
10 km walk (road)	40:46	Bryan Alexander Matías Ortíz	Guatemala	8 May 2022	Campeonato International De Marcha	San Jerónimo, Guatemala	17 years, 29 days	
4 × 100 m relay	40.03	Winston Smith; Michael Frater; Davaon Spence; Omar Brown	Jamaica	18 July 1999	World Youth Championships	Bydgoszcz, Poland	16 years, 238 days 16 years, 285 days 17 years, 27 days	
4 × 400 m relay	3:12.07	Leonardo Ledgister; Devaughn Ellington; Jauavney James; Christopher Taylor	Jamaica	6 April 2015	CARIFTA Games	Basseterre, Saint Kitts and Nevis	16 years, 344 days 17 years, 34 days 16 years, 106 days 15 years, 187 days	
Swedish medley relay	1:49.23	Waseem Williams; Michael O'Hara; Okeen Williams; Martin Manley	Jamaica	14 July 2013	World Youth Championships	Donetsk, Ukraine	16 years, 187 days 16 years, 288 days 17 years, 194 days 16 years, 126 days	

=== Girls ===
Event	Record	Athlete	Nationality	Date	Meet	Place	Age	Ref.	Video
100 m	10.94 (+0.6 m/s)	Briana Williams	Jamaica	21 June 2019	Jamaican Championships	Kingston, Jamaica	17 years, 92 days		
200 m									
400 m									
800 m									
1500 m									
Mile									
3000 m									
5000 m									
10,000 m									
100 m hurdles (76.2 cm)	12.71 (+0.8 m/s)	Kerrica Hill	Jamaica	9 April 2022	ISSA/Grace Kennedy Boys and Girls Championships	Kingston, Jamaica	17 years, 34 days		
100 m hurdles (83.8 cm)	12.77 (+0.2 m/s)	Kerrica Hill	Jamaica	6 August 2022	World U20 Championships	Cali, Colombia	17 years, 153 days		
300 m hurdles									
400 m hurdles									
2000 m steeplechase									
3000 m steeplechase									
High jump									
Pole vault									
Long jump									
Triple jump									
Shot put									
Discus throw									
Hammer throw (3 kg)	71.12 m	Amanda Almendáriz	Cuba	15 July 2017	IAAF World U18 Championships	Nairobi, Kenya	16 years, 238 days		
Hammer throw									
Javelin throw (500 g)	65.44 m	Marisleisys Duarthe	Cuba	25 May 2017	Barrientos Memorial	Havana, Cuba	16 years, 250 days		
Javelin throw	57.46 m	Yiselena Ballar Rojas	Cuba	13 March 2020	Prueba de confrontacion 2020	Havana, Cuba	17 years, 61 days		
Heptathlon (youth)	5720 pts	Adriana Rodríguez	Cuba	17-18 July 2015	World Youth Championships	Cali, Colombia	16 years, 5 days		
Heptathlon (youth)	100m H / High jump / Shot put / 200m / Long jump / Javelin / 800m; 13.43 (+0.6 m/s) / 1.73 m / 14.19 m / 24.64 (−0.5 m/s) / 5.66 m (+0.2 m/s) / 34.54 m / 2:26.91								
Heptathlon									
Heptathlon	100m H / High jump / Shot put / 200m / Long jump / Javelin / 800m								
10,000 m walk (track)									
10 km walk (road)	44:46	Maribel Rebollo	Mexico	23 May 1993		Brandýs nad Labem, Czech Republic	16 years, 251 days		
4 × 100 m relay	42.94	Serena Cole; Tina Clayton; Kerrica Hill; Tia Clayton	Jamaica	22 August 2021	World U20 Championships	Nairobi, Kenya	17 years, 57 days 17 years, 5 days 16 years, 169 days 17 years, 5 days		
4 × 400 m relay	3:34.43	Breanna Brown; Jody-Ann Daley; Rosalee Gallimore; Rhianna Lewis	Jamaica	10 April 2023	CARIFTA Games	Nassau, The Bahamas	16 years, 49 days 15 years, 340 days 15 years, 158 days		
Medley relay	2:03.42	Christania Williams; Shericka Jackson; Chrisann Gordon; Olivia James	Jamaica	10 July 2011	World Youth Championships	Lille, France	16 years, 327 days 16 years, 359 days 16 years, 295 days		

== Indoor ==
=== Boys ===
Event	Record	Athlete	Nationality	Date	Meet	Place	Age	Ref.
60 m								
200 m	21.67	Jaylen Bennett	Saint Kitts and Nevis	26 January 2024	BU John Thomas Terrier Classic	Boston, United States	16 years, 265 days	
400 m	47.83	Jaylen Bennett	Saint Kitts and Nevis	26 January 2024	BU John Thomas Terrier Classic	Boston, United States	16 years, 265 days	
800 m								
1000 m								
1500 m								
Mile								
3000 m								
5000 m								
60 m hurdles								
High jump								
Pole vault								
Long jump								
Triple jump								
Shot put								
Heptathlon								
Heptathlon	60m / Long jump / Shot put / High jump / 60m H / Pole vault / 1000m							
5000 m walk	20:18.99	Alberto Cruz	Mexico	5 March 1989	World Championships	Budapest, Hungary	16 years, 272 days	
4 × 400 m relay								

=== Girls ===
Event	Record	Athlete	Nationality	Date	Meet	Place	Age	Ref.
55 m	6.63+	Lisa Raye	Trinidad and Tobago	8 February 2025	Millrose Games	New York City, United States	17 years, 20 days	
60 m	7.13	Lisa Raye	Trinidad and Tobago	8 February 2025	Millrose Games	New York City, United States	17 years, 20 days	
200 m	22.33	Adaejah Hodge	British Virgin Islands	12 March 2023	New Balance Nationals	Boston, United States	16 years, 364 days	
400 m								
800 m								
1500 m								
Mile								
3000 m								
5000 m								
60 m hurdles								
High jump								
Pole vault								
Long jump								
Triple jump								
Shot put								
Pentathlon								
Pentathlon	60m H / High jump / Shot put / Long jump / 800m							
3000 m walk								
4 × 400 m relay								
