= List of North, Central American and Caribbean youth bests in athletics =

North, Central American and Caribbean youth bests in the sport of athletics are the all-time best marks set in competition by aged 17 or younger throughout the entire calendar year of the performance and competing for a member nation of the North American, Central American and Caribbean Athletics Association (NACAC). NACAC doesn't maintain an official list for such performances. All bests shown on this list are tracked by statisticians not officially sanctioned by the governing body.

== Outdoor ==
=== Boys ===
Event	Record	Athlete	Nationality	Date	Meet	Place	Age	Ref.
100 m	10.06 (+2.0 m/s)	Christian Miller	United States	8 July 2023	USA U20 Championships	Eugene, United States	17 years, 53 days	
200 m	19.84 (+0.3 m/s)	Erriyon Knighton	United States	27 June 2021	US Olympic Trials	Eugene, United States	17 years, 149 days	
300 m	32.90	Zachary Shinnick	United States	13 February 2016	California Winter Championships	Norwalk, United States	17 years, 5 days	
400 m	44.10	Quincy Wilson	United States	12 July 2025	Ed Murphey Classic	Memphis, United States	17 years, 185 days	
800 m	1:42.27	Cooper Lutkenhaus	United States	3 August 2025	USA Championships	Eugene, United States	16 years, 227 days	
1500 m	3:39.0 h	Jim Ryun	United States	28 June 1964		New Brunswick, United States	17 years, 60 days	
Mile	3:59.0 h	Jim Ryun	United States	5 June 1964		Compton, United States	17 years, 37 days	
3000 m								
5000 m	13:43.95	Lex Young	United States	6 May 2022		San Juan Capistrano, United States	17 years, 67 days	
10,000 m	29:06.8 h	Bill McChesney	United States	20 March 1976		Eugene, United States	17 years, 72 days	
110 m hurdles (91.4 cm)	12.94 (+2.0 m/s)	Jahcario Wilson	Bahamas	11 July 2026	NACAC U18 Championships	Apizaco, Mexico	16 years, 192 days	
110 m hurdles (99/100 cm)	13.20 (+0.6 m/s)	Dejour Russell	Jamaica	20 July 2016	World U20 Championships	Bydgoszcz, Poland	16 years, 110 days	
110 m hurdles	13.32 (+0.7 m/s)	Dejour Russell	Jamaica	24 June 2017	Jamaican Championships	Kingston, Jamaica	17 years, 84 days	
300 m hurdles (91.4 cm)	36.45	Bershawn Jackson	United States	13 May 2000		Gainesville, United States	17 years, 5 days	
400 m hurdles (84.0 cm)	49.01	William Wynne	United States	15 July 2007	World Youth Championships	Ostrava, Czech Republic	17 years, 166 days	
400 m hurdles (91.4 cm)	49.29	Jaheel Hyde	Jamaica	25 July 2014	World Junior Championships	Eugene, United States	17 years, 173 days	
2000 m steeplechase	5:45.20	Bailey Roth	United States	20 July 2013	World Youth Championships	Donetsk, Ukraine	17 years, 184 days	
3000 m steeplechase	8:53.78	Osmani Calzado	Cuba	18 March 2005	Cuban National Championships	Havana, Cuba	16 years, 264 days	
High jump	2.33 m	Javier Sotomayor	Cuba	19 May 1984		Havana, Cuba	16 years, 219 days	
Pole vault	5.40 m	Brandon Bray	United States	10 May 2014	UIL Championships	Austin, United States	17 years, 16 days	
Long jump	8.28 m (+1.8 m/s)	Maykel Massó	Cuba	28 May 2016	Memorial Barrientos	Havana, Cuba	17 years, 20 days	
Triple jump	17.41 m (+1.0 m/s)	Jordan A. Díaz	Cuba	8 June 2018		Havana, Cuba	17 years, 105 days	
Shot put (5 kg)	22.38 m (73 ft 5 in)	Jackson Cantwell	United States	14 June 2024	Nike Outdoor Nationals	Eugene, United States	16 years, 18 days	
Shot put (6 kg)	20.62 m	Adrian Piperi	United States	19 July 2016	World Junior Championships	Bydgoszcz, Poland	17 years, 181 days	
Shot put (7.26 kg)	18.72 m	Arnold Campbell	United States	May 18, 1983		Shreveport, United States	16 years, 184 days	
Discus throw (1.5 kg)	67.05 m	Fedrick Dacres	Jamaica	6 July 2011	World Youth Championships	Lille, France	17 years, 128 days	
Discus throw (1.750 kg)	59.92 m	Ralford Mullings	Jamaica	19 July 2019	Pan American U20 Athletics Championships	San José, Costa Rica	16 years, 239 days	
Hammer throw (5 kg)	80.39 m	Conor McCullough	United States	1 June 2008		Norwalk, United States	17 years, 122 days	
Hammer throw (6 kg)	75.88 m	Conor McCullough	United States	12 July 2008		Bydgoszcz, Poland	17 years, 163 days	
Hammer throw (7.26 kg)	73.43 m	Alec Faldermeyer	United States	18 April 2009	Princeton Larry Ellis Invitational	Princeton, United States	16 years, 283 days	
Javelin throw (700g)	76.88 m	Devin Bogert	United States	22 August 2010	Youth Olympic Games	Singapore	17 years, 87 days	
Javelin throw (800 g)	68.30 m	Kaleb Zuidema	United States	5 May 2010		Glen Rock, United States	17 years, 199 days	
Octathlon	6482 pts	Yordanis García	Cuba	13–14 July 2005		Marrakesh, Morocco	16 years, 235 days	
Octathlon	11.24 (100 m), 6.86 m (long jump), 16.39 m (shot put), 51.35 (400 m) / 14.11 (110 m hurdles), 1.95 m (high jump), 65.76 m (javelin), 2:54.19 (1000 m)							
5000 m walk (track)	20:31.53	Gilberto Menjívar	El Salvador	11 October 2018	Youth Olympic Games	Buenos Aires, Argentina	17 years, 50 days	
10,000 m walk (track)	39:27.10	Emiliano Barba	Mexico	30 August 2024	World Athletics U20 Championships	Lima, Peru	17 years, 160 days	
10 km walk (road)	40:46	Bryan Alexander Matías Ortíz	Guatemala	8 May 2022	Campeonato International De Marcha	San Jerónimo, Guatemala	17 years, 29 days	
4 × 100 m relay	39.95	Alex Sands; Cameron Douglas; Terry Conwell; Terryon Conwell	United States (Elite Speed Youth Track Club A)	12 July 2015	Hoschton USATF U19 JO Region 4 Qualifier	Hoschton, United States	16 years, 352 days 16 years, 352 days 16 years, 352 days	
4 × 400 m relay	3:12.07	Leonardo Ledgister; Devaughn Ellington; Jauavney James; Christopher Taylor	Jamaica	6 April 2015	CARIFTA Games	Basseterre, Saint Kitts and Nevis	16 years, 344 days 17 years, 34 days 16 years, 106 days 15 years, 187 days	
Swedish medley relay	1:49.23	Waseem Williams; Michael O'Hara; Okeen Williams; Martin Manley	Jamaica	14 July 2013	World Youth Championships	Donetsk, Ukraine	16 years, 187 days 16 years, 288 days 17 years, 194 days 16 years, 126 days	

=== Girls ===
Event	Record	Athlete	Nationality	Date	Meet	Place	Age	Ref.	Video
100 m	10.98 (+2.0 m/s)	Candace Hill	United States	20 June 2015	Brooks PR Invitational	Shoreline, United States	16 years, 130 days		
100 m	10.94 (+0.6 m/s) X (Note: Williams later tested positive for the banned substance hydrochlorothiazide and her results from the championships were nullified.)	Briana Williams	Jamaica	21 June 2019	Jamaican Championships	Kingston, Jamaica	17 years, 92 days		
200 m	22.43 (−0.7 m/s)	Candace Hill	United States	19 July 2015	World Youth Championships	Cali, Colombia	16 years, 158 days		
400 m	50.69	Sanya Richards	United States	22 June 2002	USA U20 Championships	Palo Alto, United States	17 years, 116 days		
600 m	1:25.22	Sophia Gorriaran	United States	30 April 2022	Penn Relays	Philadelphia, United States	16 years, 314 days		
800 m	1:59.51	Mary Cain	United States	1 June 2013	Prefontaine Classic	Eugene, United States	17 years, 29 days		
1500 m	4:04.62	Mary Cain	United States	17 May 2013	USATF Oxy High Performance Meet	Los Angeles, United States	17 years, 14 days		
Mile									
3000 m	9:09.71	Katelyn Tuohy	United States	8 June 2018	New York State Public High School Athletic Association State Championships	Cicero, United States	16 years, 82 days		
5000 m	15:25.27	Elizabeth Leachman	United States	28 March 2024	Texas Relays	Austin, United States	16 years, 68 days		
10,000 m	33:26.53	Cathy Schiro	United States	17 June 1984	United States Olympic trials	Los Angeles, United States	16 years, 334 days		
100 m hurdles (76.2 cm)	12.71 (+0.8 m/s)	Kerrica Hill	Jamaica	9 April 2022	ISSA/Grace Kennedy Boys and Girls Championships	Kingston, Jamaica	17 years, 34 days		
100 m hurdles (83.8 cm)	12.77 (+0.2 m/s)	Kerrica Hill	Jamaica	6 August 2022	World U20 Championships	Cali, Colombia	17 years, 153 days		
300 m hurdles	40.10	Ebony Collins	United States	4 June 2005		Sacramento, United States	16 years, 85 days		
400 m hurdles	54.15	Sydney McLaughlin	United States	10 July 2016	United States Olympic Trials	Eugene, United States	16 years, 338 days		
2000 m steeplechase	6:29.08	Sarah Trainor	United States	4 May 2019	Race at the Oval Office	New York City, United States	16 years, 346 days		
3000 m steeplechase	10:15.26	Mel Lawrence	United States	23 June 2006	USA U20 Championships	Indianapolis, United States	16 years, 298 days		
High jump	1.96 m	Vashti Cunningham	United States	1 August 2015	Pan American Junior Championships	Edmonton, Canada	17 years, 195 days		
Pole vault	4.51 m	Amanda Moll	United States	25 March 2022	Texas Relays	Austin, United States	17 years, 53 days		
Long jump	6.68 m (+0.7 m/s)	Lanae-Tava Thomas	United States	26 July 2017	USA Track and Field Junior Olympic Championships	Lawrence, United States	16 years, 179 days		
Triple jump	14.25 m (+0.5 m/s)	Dailenys Alcántara	Cuba	10 July 2008	World Junior Championships	Bydgoszcz, Poland	16 years, 335 days		
Shot put									
Shot put (3 kg)	18.31 m	Alyssa Wilson	United States	5 June 2016	Monmouth University Shot Put Meeting	West Long Branch, United States	17 years, 106 days		
Discus throw	59.11 m	Julia Tunks	Canada	15 April 2023	Millican Field at Throw Town	Ramona, United States	16 years, 269 days		
Hammer throw	65.32 m	Shelby Ashe	United States	15 June 2010		Marietta, United States	17 years, 94 days		
Hammer throw (3 kg)	71.12 m	Amanda Almendáriz	Cuba	15 July 2017	IAAF World U18 Championships	Nairobi, Kenya	16 years, 238 days		
Javelin throw (500 g)	65.44 m	Marisleisys Duarthe	Cuba	25 May 2017	Barrientos Memorial	Havana, Cuba	16 years, 250 days		
Javelin throw	57.46 m	Yiselena Ballar Rojas	Cuba	13 March 2020	Prueba de confrontacion 2020	Havana, Cuba	17 years, 61 days		
Heptathlon (youth)	5720 pts	Adriana Rodríguez	Cuba	17–18 July 2015	World Youth Championships	Cali, Colombia	16 years, 5 days		
Heptathlon (youth)	13.43 (+0.6 m/s) (100m hurdles), 1.73m (high jump), 14.19m (shot put), 24.64 (−0.5 m/s) (200m) / 5.66m (+0.2 m/s) (long jump), 34.54m (javelin), 2:26.91 (800m)								
5000 m walk (track)	22:16.91 Mx	Rachelle De Orbeta	Puerto Rico	17 March 2017		San Juan, Puerto Rico	16 years, 355 days		
5000 m walk (track)	22:17.85 Wo	Alejandra Ortega	Mexico	8 July 2011	World Youth Championships	Lille, France	17 years, 0 days		
5 km walk (road)	23:08	Taylor Ewert	United States	10 August 2018	USA vs. Canada Junior Race Walk match	Toronto Islands, Canada	16 years, 262 days		
10,000 m walk (track)	45:57.81	Taylor Ewert	United States	14 July 2018	World U20 Championships	Tampere, Finland	16 years, 235 days		
10 km walk (road)	44:46	Maribel Rebollo	Mexico	23 May 1993		Brandýs nad Labem, Czech Republic	16 years, 251 days		
4 × 100 m relay	42.94	Serena Cole; Tina Clayton; Kerrica Hill; Tia Clayton	Jamaica	22 August 2021	World U20 Championships	Nairobi, Kenya	17 years, 57 days 17 years, 5 days 16 years, 169 days 17 years, 5 days		
4 × 400 m relay	3:34.43	Breanna Brown; Jody-Ann Daley; Rosalee Gallimore; Rhianna Lewis	Jamaica	10 April 2023	CARIFTA Games	Nassau, The Bahamas	16 years, 49 days 15 years, 340 days 15 years, 158 days		
Medley relay	2:03.42	Christania Williams; Shericka Jackson; Chrisann Gordon; Olivia James	Jamaica	10 July 2011	World Youth Championships	Lille, France	16 years, 266 days 16 years, 359 days 16 years, 295 days 17 years, 39 days		

=== Mixed ===
Event	Record	Athlete	Nationality	Date	Meet	Place	Age	Ref.	Video
4 × 400 m relay	3:19.54	Keshun Reed; Lynna Irby; Norman Grimes; Samantha Watson	United States	19 July 2015	World Youth Championships	Cali, Colombia	17 years, 124 days 16 years, 225 days 17 years, 194 days 15 years, 251 days		

== Indoor ==
=== Boys ===
Event	Record	Athlete	Nationality	Date	Meet	Place	Age	Ref.
50 m	5.81	Jeremy Rankin	United States	11 March 2007		Landover, United States	16 years, 169 days	
55 m	6.12	Ronald Darby	United States	21 December 2011	Prince George's County Invitational	Landover, United States	17 years, 353 days	
60 m	6.59	Dillon Mitchell	United States	1 March 2026	USA Championships	Staten Island, United States	16 years, 87 days	
200 m	20.79	Nyckoles Harbor	United States	22 January 2022	Texas Tech Under Armour High School Classic	Lubbock, United States	16 years, 201 days	
300 m	32.87	Tyrese Cooper	United States	4 February 2017	Armory Track Invitational	New York City, United States	16 years, 320 days	
400 m	45.66	Quincy Wilson	United States	2 February 2025	New Balance Indoor Grand Prix	Boston, United States	17 years, 25 days	
500 m	1:01.27	Quincy Wilson	United States	12 January 2024	The VA Showcase	Lynchburg, United States	16 years, 4 days	
600 m	1:16.20	Quincy Wilson	United States	8 February 2025	Millrose Games	New York City, United States	17 years, 31 days	
800 m	1:44.03	Cooper Lutkenhaus	United States	14 February 2026	Sound Invite	Winston-Salem, United States	17 years, 57 days	
1000 m	2:24.18	Marcus Reilly	United States	30 January 2022	Boston University John Thomas Terrier Classic	Boston, United States	16 years, 78 days	
1500 m	3:52.50	Andy Powell	United States	9 March 1997	National Scholastic Indoor Championships	Boston, United States	16 years, 351 days	
Mile	4:07.04	Marcus Reilly	United States	27 February 2022	Boston University Last Chance Meet	Boston, United States	16 years, 106 days	
3000 m	7:57.06	Lex Young	United States	February 5, 2022	Dr. Sander Invitational	New York City, United States	16 years, 342 days	
5000 m	13:59.96	Daniel Simmons	United States	11 March 2023	New Balance Nationals Indoor	Boston, United States	17 years, 39 days	
50 m hurdles (99/100 cm)	6.69	Wayne Davis	United States	11 March 2007		Landover, United States	15 years, 201 days	
60 m hurdles (91.4 cm)	7.71	Brahian Peña	Dominican Republic	13 February 2011		St. Gallen, Switzerland	16 years, 316 days	
60 m hurdles (99/100 cm)	7.62	Wayne Davis	United States	16 March 2008		Landover, United States	16 years, 207 days	
High jump	2.18 m	Scott Sellers	United States	11 January 2003	Carl Lewis Invitational	Houston, United States	16 years, 148 days	
High jump	2.18 m	Dartis Willis	United States	18 December 2010	Great Lakes Classic	Ypsilanti, United States	17 years, 88 days	
Pole vault	5.34 m	Andrew Irwin	United States	15 May 2010	Arkansas Vault Club Gravity Cheater Vault Meet	Black Springs, United States	17 years, 112 days	
Long jump	7.80 m	Ja'Mari Ward	United States	14 March 2015	New Balance Nationals Indoor	New York City, United States	16 years, 358 days	
Triple jump								
Shot put	19.29 m	Jeremy Kline	United States	12 March 2011		Hillside, United States		
Shot put (5 kg)	20.01 m	Joseph Maxwell	Canada	14 February 2015	AO Youth Senior Championships	Toronto, Canada	16 years, 317 days	
Heptathlon								
Heptathlon	60m / Long jump / Shot put / High jump / 60m H / Pole vault / 1000m							
5000 m walk	20:18.99	Alberto Cruz	Mexico	5 March 1989	World Indoor Championships	Budapest, Hungary	16 years, 272 days	
4 × 200 m relay	1:26.09	Long Beach Polytechnic High School; Isaiah Green; Vincent Joseph; Travon Patterson; Bryshon Nellum	United States	13 March 2005	New Balance Nationals Indoor	New York City, United States	15 years, 215 days 17 years, 52 days 16 years, 174 days 15 years, 316 days	
4 × 400 m relay	3:23.04	Zebulon B. Vance TC, Charlotte; Lamar Johnson; Erin Jenkins; Cameron Tate; Jarrett Samuels	United States	14 March 2010	Nike Indoor Nationals	Boston, United States		

=== Girls ===
Event	Record	Athlete	Nationality	Date	Meet	Place	Age	Ref.
50 m	6.28	Victoria Jordan	United States	11 March 2007		Landover, Maryland, United States	17 years, 13 days	
55 m	6.63+	Lisa Raye	Trinidad and Tobago	8 February 2025	Millrose Games	New York City, United States	17 years, 20 days	
60 m	7.13	Lisa Raye	Trinidad and Tobago	8 February 2025	Millrose Games	New York City, United States	17 years, 20 days	
200 m	22.33	Adaejah Hodge	British Virgin Islands	12 March 2023	New Balance Nationals	Boston, United States	16 years, 364 days	
300 m	37.38	Kayla Davis	United States	18 January 2020	The VA Showcase	Lynchburg, United States	16 years, 28 days	
400 m	51.84	Sydney McLaughlin	United States	13 March 2016	New Balance Nationals	New York City, United States	16 years, 219 days	
500 m	1:11.44	Devon Williams	United States	26 December 2004	MAC Holiday Classic	New York City, United States	15 years, 211 days	
600 m	1:23.57	Athing Mu	United States	24 February 2019	USA Championships	Staten Island, United States	16 years, 261 days	
800 m	2:00.58	Sophia Gorriaran	United States	11 February 2022	BU David Hemery Valentine Invitational	Boston, United States	16 years, 236 days	
1000 m	2:41.53	Roisin Willis	United States	20 February 2021	CYUP Misfits Invitational	Chicago, United States	16 years, 198 days	
1500 m	4:11.72+	Mary Cain	United States	16 February 2013	Millrose Games	New York, United States	16 years, 289 days	
Mile	4:28.25	Mary Cain	United States	16 February 2013	Millrose Games	New York, United States	16 years, 289 days	
3000 m	9:01.81	Katelyn Tuohy	United States	26 January 2019	Dr. Sander Columbia Challenge	New York City, United States	16 years, 314 days	
3000 m	9:00.16 OT (Note: Non-ratifiable as the track was an oversized track and not a 200m track eligible for indoor record-purposes)	Alexa Efraimson	United States	February 1, 2014	Seattle Washington Invitational	Seattle, United States	16 years, 346 days	
Two miles	9:38.68	Mary Cain	United States	2 February 2013	New Balance Indoor Grand Prix	Boston, United States	16 years, 275 days	
5000 m	15:28.90	Elizabeth Leachman	United States	9 March 2024	Nike Indoor Nationals	New York City, United States	15 years, 361 days	
50 m hurdles (84 cm)	6.95	Candy Young	United States	3 February 1979		Edmonton, Alberta, Canada	16 years, 258 days	
60 m hurdles (76.2 cm)	8.41	Tatiana Aholou	Canada	10 December 2016	Défi des champions	Sherbrooke, Canada	16 years, 14 days	
60 m hurdles (84 cm)	8.05	Grace Stark	United States	11 March 2018	New Balance Nationals Indoor	New York City, United States	16 years, 309 days	
High jump	1.91 m	Morgan Smalls	United States	8 March 2019	New Balance Nationals	New York City, United States	16 years, 301 days	
Pole vault	4.50 m	Amanda Moll	United States	27 February 2022	USA Championships	Spokane, United States	17 years, 27 days	
Long jump	6.47 m	Ava Kitchings	United States	8 February 2025	Millrose Games	New York City, United States	16 years, 346 days	
Triple jump	13.10 m	Jasmine Moore	United States	11 March 2018	New York New Balance Indoor Nationals	New York City, United States	16 years, 314 days	
Shot put	16.73 m	Alyssa Wilson	United States	1 March 2016	New York Eastern States Championships	New York City, United States	17 years, 10 days	
Pentathlon	4054 pts	Anna Hall	United States	10 March 2018	New York New Balance Indoor Nationals	New York City, United States	16 years, 352 days	
Pentathlon	8.82 (60 m hurdles), 1.74 m (high jump), 11.06 m (shot put), 5.68 m (long jump), 2:17.98 (800 m)							
3000 m walk								
4 × 400 m relay	3:39.70	Lauryn Harris; Leah Phillips; Masai Russell; Shaniya Hall	United States (Bullis School)	12 March 2017	New York New Balance Nationals	New York City, United States	14 years, 210 days 16 years, 268 days 15 years, 151 days	
