= Leon Reid =

Northern Irish sprinter

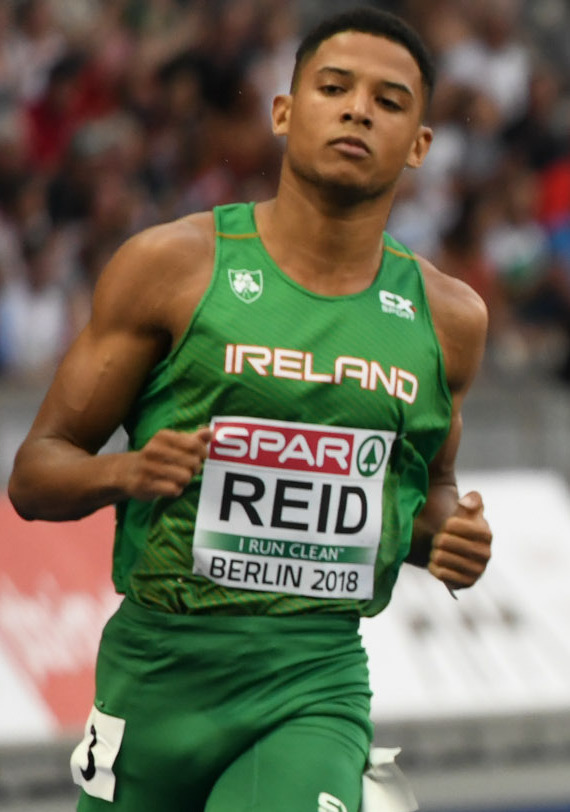
- Reid at the 2018 European Athletics Championships in Berlin

Personal information
- Nationality: British; Irish
- Born: 26 July 1994 (age 31) Bath, England

Sport
- Country: Ireland
- Sport: Athletics
- Events: 100 metres, 200 metres
- Club: Menapians AC
- Coached by: James Hillier
- Retired: 2023

Achievements and titles
- Personal bests: 100 m: 10.30 (Worthing 2021); 200 m: 20.27 (Birmingham 2018); Indoors; 60 m: 6.68 (Dublin 2021)
Medal record
Men's athletics
Representing Northern Ireland
Commonwealth Games
| Bronze medal – third place | 2018 Gold Coast | 200 m |
Representing Great Britain
European U23 Championships
| Silver medal – second place | 2015 Tallinn | 200 m |
European U20 Championships
| Silver medal – second place | 2013 Rieti | 200 m |
European Youth Olympic Festival
| Silver medal – second place | 2011 Trabzon | 100 m |
| Silver medal – second place | 2011 Trabzon | 4×100 m relay |
Representing England
Commonwealth Youth Games
| Silver medal – second place | 2011 Douglas | 4×100 m relay |

Leon Reid (born 26 July 1994) is a former British-Irish track and field sprinter. He won the bronze medal in the 200 metres at the 2018 Commonwealth Games, Northern Ireland's first athletics medal in 28 years, and silver in the event at the 2013 European Under-23 Championships.

Reid took silver in the 200 m at the 2013 European U20 Championships. He won five Irish national titles (mostly for the 200 m).

Leon grew up in the care system, experiencing 13 foster homes. He became an ambassador for the charity Break in 2024 hoping to use his experience of being in care to raise awareness of the issues young people leaving care (care leavers) face.

== Career ==
Born in the West Country, England, Leon Reid won silver medals for Great Britain at the 2011 European Youth Olympic Festival, 2013 European Athletics Under-20 Championships and 2015 European Athletics U23 Championships. He also won a relay silver medal for England at the 2008 Commonwealth Youth Games. He later decided to represent Northern Ireland – the nation of his mother's birth – and made his international debut for them at the 2014 Commonwealth Games. He attempted to transfer his allegiance to represent Ireland, but this move was blocked following a temporary freeze on such moves by the International Association of Athletics Federations. Once the freeze was lifted, Reid began competing for Ireland, with his first event the 2018 European Championships.

Reid took bronze in the men's 200 metres at the 2018 Commonwealth Games. Initially he finished fourth, but was elevated when Zharnel Hughes was disqualified for a lane violation. This was the first Commonwealth Games athletics medal for Northern Ireland in 28 years.

Reid won the 200 metres at the Irish Athletics Championships in June 2021, and was nominated for the postponed 2020 Tokyo Olympics team. Initially, the Olympic Federation of Ireland rejected Reid's selection to the team, due to his pending trial for conspiracy to supply cocaine, but he was included in the team after filing an appeal. The Olympic Games took place in August 2021, and Reid qualified for the 200 metres semi-finals by finishing fifth in his heat, with a season's best time of 20.53 seconds. He failed to qualify for the final after finishing seventh in his semi-final.

Reid was selected for the Northern Irish team at the 2022 Commonwealth Games, but on 12 July 2022, he was barred from participating on security grounds.

== Personal life ==
Reid was born in Bath to an English-Jamaican father, and a mother from Belfast, Northern Ireland. He was adopted by a woman whose parents were from the Republic of Ireland. He has self-identified as both Northern Irish and Irish.

In April 2021, Reid was charged with conspiracy to supply cocaine by Bristol Crown Court. In February 2022, he was given a 22-month suspended sentence, and ordered to do 220 hours of unpaid work.

== International competitions ==
Representing Great Britain (–04/2018) / Ireland (08/2018–) / Northern Ireland
| Year | Competition | Venue | Position | Event | Time |
|---|---|---|---|---|---|
| 2011 | European Youth Summer Olympic Festival | Trabzon, Turkey | 2nd | 100 m | 10.68 |
| 2011 | European Youth Summer Olympic Festival | Trabzon, Turkey | 2nd | 4 × 100 m relay | 41.37 |
| 2011 | Commonwealth Youth Games | Douglas, Isle of Man | 6th | 100 m | 10.72w |
| 2011 | Commonwealth Youth Games | Douglas, Isle of Man | 2nd | 4 × 100 m relay | 41.06 |
| 2013 | European Junior Championships | Rieti, Italy | 2nd | 200 m | 20.92 |
| 2013 | European Junior Championships | Rieti, Italy | 5th | 4 × 100 m relay | 40.09 |
| 2014 | Commonwealth Games | Glasgow, United Kingdom | — (h) | 100 m | DQ |
| 2014 | Commonwealth Games | Glasgow, United Kingdom | 8th (sf) | 200 m | 21.03 |
| 2015 | European U23 Championships | Tallinn, Estonia | 2nd | 200 m | 20.63 |
| 2018 | Commonwealth Games | Gold Coast, Australia | 3rd | 200 m | 20.55 |
| 2018 | European Championships | Berlin, Germany | 7th | 200 m | 20.37 |
| 2018 | European Championships | Berlin, Germany | 11th (h) | 4 × 400 m relay | 3:06.55 |
| 2021 | European Indoor Championships | Toruń, Poland | 34th (h) | 60 m | 6.75 |
| 2021 | Olympics Games | Tokyo, Japan | 20th (sf) | 200 m | 20.54 |

== See also ==
- List of Commonwealth Games medallists in athletics (men)
