= Grace Robinson =

Australian athlete

Personal information
- National team: Australia
- Born: 31 December 1998 (age 27)
- Education: Bethany College

Sport
- Sport: Athletics
- Event(s): Discus, javelin, shot put
- Club: St George District Athletic Club
- Coached by: Chris Robinson

Achievements and titles
- Personal best(s): Shot put: 16.59m (Melbourne 2015); Discus throw: 43.25m (Brisbane 2015); Javelin throw: 39.71m (Sydney 2015)
Medal record
Commonwealth Youth Games
Gold medal – first place	2015 Apia	Shot put
- Updated on 18 August 2016

Grace Robinson (born 31 December 1998) is an Australian track and field athlete competing in the disciplines of discus, javelin throw, and shot put. She represented Australia in women's shot put at the 2014 Summer Youth Olympics and 2015 Commonwealth Youth Games, winning gold in the latter.

== Career ==
Prior to international competition, Robinson achieved early success in national events, winning gold in women's shot put at the 2012 Australian Little Athletics Championships and captured multiple national junior records such as the under-13 shot put record and the under-11 discus record. By 2013, she held four Australian national records and was ranked the no. 1 Australian junior thrower, after winning gold in both the women's shot put and discus at the 2013 Australian Junior Athletics Championships, setting a shot put meet record of 14.66m. She also notably threw a then-personal best of 16.05m, more than the 15m needed to qualify for the 2013 World Youth Championships in Athletics. She was, however, unable to compete due to age restrictions for the World Youth Championships.

In 2014, Robinson was selected as part of the Australian squad sent to the 2014 Summer Youth Olympics in Nanjing, China, to compete in the girls' shot put event. She qualified for the team after narrowly beating Queensland athlete Luisa Sekona during national trials for the Youth Olympics, throwing only 4 cm better than Sekona, at 15.91m. In the qualifying rounds of the girls' shot put event, Robinson threw 15.61m on her third attempt, which saw her place sixth and secure a place in the final. However, she ultimately placed seventh in the final, throwing a distance of 15.42m and failing to capture a medal. Despite the result, Robinson expressed gratitude in an interview after the event, stating, "even though it wasn’t a good throw, I’m pretty happy to be at the Youth Olympics. It’s such a great opportunity." Robinson would later take part in the inaugural 8 × 100 meter mixed team relay event the following week, joining four other girls and five boys from various NOCs as part of Team 020 in the event. The team, however, failed to qualify for the final, despite placing third in the third heat of the event, clocking in a time of 1:52.45.

Robinson would appear again in international competition at the 2015 Commonwealth Youth Games in Apia, Samoa, competing in the women's shot put alongside fellow Australian athlete Kristina Moore. Robinson threw 16.39m in the event, achieving her goal of beating her previous personal best of 16.25m, and defeating British athlete Sophie Merritt's throw of 15.78m by 61 cm, to claim the gold medal. The win was Robinson's first ever gold medal in an international event, and also set the Commonwealth Youth games record in women's shot put.

== Personal life ==
Robinson was born on 31 December 1998. She was raised with, and trains closely with, her cousin Pita Toamotu, who is also an athlete. Robinson's father Chris raised her and Toamotu as a sibling pair, after Toamotu's father had died early in his childhood. Both Robinson and Toamotu started athletics when they were six years of age, and by age 13, were both training four times a week. Robinson was previously coached by Ray Russell of the St George District Athletic Club, but is now coached by her father, Chris Robinson.

== Statistics ==
=== International competitions ===
Year	Competition	Venue	Position	Event	Notes
2014	Youth Olympic Games	Nanjing, China	3rd (heats)	Mixed 8 × 100 meter relay	1:52.45 (Note: Overall time of Team 020 during Heat 3 of the Mixed 8 × 100 meter relay.)
2014	Youth Olympic Games	Nanjing, China	7th	Shot put (Note: 3-kilogram (6.6 lb) weight shot put.)	15.42m
2015	Commonwealth Youth Games	Apia, Samoa	1st	Shot put	16.39m GR

== See also ==
- Athletics in Australia
