= Athletics at the 2015 Commonwealth Youth Games =

Athletics at the V Commonwealth Youth Games
- Dates: 7–9 September
- Host city: Apia, Samoa
- Venue: Apia Park Sports Complex
- Events: 34
- Records set: 12 games records

Athletics was one of the nine sports of the 2015 Commonwealth Youth Games. Held between 7 and 9 September, the events were staged at the Apia Park Sports Complex in Apia, Samoa.

Each Commonwealth Games Association was permitted to send up to two athletes per event and one team per each of the three relay events. The age of participating athletes was limited to 16- and 17-year-olds only. This meant that for 2015 athletes must have been born in 1998 or 1999 to be eligible to take part. Compared to the previous edition, the 2015 programme did not include the 2000 metres steeplechase, hammer throw, and triple jump disciplines. Two relay races were added to the programme, over distances of 4 × 200 m and 4 × 400 m.

The highlight of the first day was a run of 10.20 seconds by the winner of the boys' 100 metres, Tlotliso Leotlela. This was one hundredth slower than the world youth best for the event and the joint-second fastest ever run by a youth athlete.

== Medal summary ==
=== Men ===
Event	Gold		Silver		Bronze	
100 metres	Tlotliso Leotlela (RSA)	10.20 GR	Rechmial Miller (ENG)	10.39	Cameron Tindle (SCO)	10.42
200 metres	Tlotliso Leotlela (RSA)	20.56 w	Toby Harries (ENG)	20.56 w	Kyle Bradley Appel (RSA)	21.11 w
400 metres	Karabo Sibanda (BOT)	45.83 GR	Jamal Walton (CAY)	46.46	Chandan Bauri (IND)	46.99
800 metres	Willy Tarbei (KEN)	1:46.05 GR	Bett Kipyegon (KEN)	1:46.15	Ben Greenwood (SCO)	1:50.42
1500 metres	Kumari Taki (KEN)	3:39.80 GR	Lawi Kosgei (KEN)	3:40.77	Brodie Modini (AUS)	3:55.38
3000 metres	Davis Kiplangat (KEN)	7:59.56	Richard Kimunyan (KEN)	7:59.78	Alex Yee (ENG)	8:18.12
110 metres hurdles	Mpho Katlego Tladi (RSA)	13.50	Benjamin Collerton (NZL)	14.22	Benjamin Fisher (NIR)	14.32
400 metres hurdles	Rivaldo Leacock (BAR)	51.12 GR	Jauavney James (JAM)	51.54	Harrison Kimpton-Moss (AUS)	52.33
4×100 metres relay	Botswana (BOT); Karabo Sibanda; Thabiso Sekgopi; Aobakwe Malau; Kabo Mphali	41.94	Australia (AUS); Grant Szalek; Johnathan Taylor; Rowan Sutton; Lachlan McDermot	42.67	Nigeria (NGR); Henry Effiong Etim; Adeyemi Sikiru; Itsekiri Usheoritse Ese; Idjesa Uruemu	42.68
4×200 metres relay	Nigeria (NGR); Ojeikere Precious Omokheoa; Itsekiri Usheoritse Ese; Idjesa Uruemu; Adeyemi Sikiru	1:28.35	Samoa (SAM); Junior Palamo; Joe Fruean; Luatimu Samau; William Brown	1:35.76	Only two starters	
4×400 metres relay	Jamaica (JAM); Leonardo Ledgister; Michael Bentley; Leon Clarke; Jauavney James	3:13.45	Samoa (SAM); Leo Tiasasa; William Brown; Matthew Kolio; Daniel Talivaa	3:43.15	Only three starters and two finishers (Kenya DQ)	
High jump	Tejaswin Shankar (IND)	2.14 m GR	Roshan Dammika Ranatunga Ranatungage (SRI)	2.11 m	Lashane Wilson (JAM)	2.11 m
Long jump	Richard Seklorwu (GHA)	7.67 m w	Thomas Wilson (AUS)	7.48 m	Benjamin Fisher (NIR)	7.38 m
Shot put	Kevin Nedrick (JAM)	20.12 m GR	Werner Jakobus Visser (RSA)	19.78 m	Burger Lambrechts, Jr. (RSA)	19.31 m
Discus throw	Werner Jakobus Visser (RSA)	60.94 m	George Evans (SCO)	58.19 m	Burger Lambrechts, Jr. (RSA)	58.02 m
Javelin throw	Hadeesh Mohd (IND)	79.29 m	George Davies (ENG)	68.23 m	Luke Giacca (AUS)	67.91 m

=== Women ===
Event	Gold		Silver		Bronze	
100 metres	Abolaji Omotayo Oluwaseun (NGR)	11.59	Aniekeme Alphonsus (NGR)	11.64	Alisha Rees (SCO)	11.72
200 metres	Idamadudu Praise Oghenefejiro (NGR)	23.30 w	Alisha Rees (SCO)	23.61 w	Aniekeme Alphonsus (NGR)	23.63 w
400 metres	Junelle Bromfield (JAM)	53.09	Jisna Mathew (IND)	53.14	Idamadudu Praise Oghenefejiro (NGR)	53.20
800 metres	Amy Harding-Delooze (AUS)	2:06.84	Carys McAulay (SCO)	2:07.05	Abitha Mary Manuel (IND)	2:07.33
1500 metres	Amy Harding-Delooze (AUS)	4:18.02 GR	Peruth Chemutai (UGA)	4:18.22	Janat Chemusto (UGA)	4:19.48
3000 metres	Sheila Chelangat (KEN)	9:10.12	Peruth Chemutai (UGA)	9:20.20	Janat Chemusto (UGA)	9:56.62
100 metres hurdles	Taylon Bieldt (RSA)	13.18 GR	Kirra Womersley (AUS)	13.39	Rachel Pace (AUS)	13.46
400 metres hurdles	Junelle Bromfield (JAM)	1:00.78	Yamani Danansooriya Mudi (SRI)	1:01.70	Niamh Emerson (ENG)	1:01.99
4×100 metres relay	Nigeria (NGR); Aniekeme Alphonsus; Idamadudu Praise Oghenefejiro; Adiakerehwa Blessing; Abolaji Omotayo Oluwaseun	45.86	Australia (AUS); Rachel Pace; Kirra Womersley; Madeleine Attlee; Jacinta Beecher	47.36	Samoa (SAM); Claudia Osborne; Miriama Mefiposeta; Emele Paletasala; June Solia	53.97
4×200 metres relay	Nigeria (NGR); Adiakerehwa Blessing; Uche Brown; Aniekeme Alphonsus; Abolaji Omotayo Oluwaseun	1:41.60	Samoa (SAM); Miriama Mefiposeta; June Solia; Emele Paletasala; Claudia Osborne	1:57.57	Only two starters	
4×400 metres relay	Nigeria (NGR); Adiakerehwa Blessing; Abolaji Omotayo Oluwaseun; Aniekeme Alphonsus; Idamadudu Praise Oghenefejiro	4:02.75	Only two starters and one finisher (Samoa DQ)			
High jump	Niamh Emerson (ENG)	1.80 m	Adaora Chigba (ENG)	1.77 m	Paige Wilson (AUS)	1.74 m
Long jump	Renate Monika van Tonder (RSA)	6.26 m w	Billie Arch (AUS)	6.04 m w	Rachel Alexander (SCO)	5.90 m w
Shot put	Grace Robinson (AUS)	16.39 m GR	Sophie Merritt (ENG)	15.78 m	Anamika Das (IND)	15.03 m
Discus throw	Kristina Moore (AUS)	46.95 m	Bianca Hansen (AUS)	46.20 m	Sophie Merritt (ENG)	44.83 m
Javelin throw	Emma Hamplett (ENG)	49.57 m	Shanee Angol (DMA)	45.45 m	Rochelle Etienne (LCA)	40.88 m

== Medal table ==
* Host nation (Samoa)

Rank	Nation	Gold	Silver	Bronze	Total
1	Nigeria	6	1	3	10
1	South Africa	6	1	3	10
3	Australia	4	6	5	15
4	Kenya	4	3	0	7
5	Jamaica	4	1	1	6
6	England	2	5	3	10
7	India	2	1	3	6
8	Botswana	2	0	0	2
9	Barbados	1	0	0	1
9	Ghana	1	0	0	1
11	Scotland	0	3	4	7
12	Samoa*	0	3	1	4
13	Uganda	0	2	2	4
14	Sri Lanka	0	2	0	2
15	Cayman Islands	0	1	0	1
15	Dominica	0	1	0	1
15	New Zealand	0	1	0	1
18	Northern Ireland	0	0	1	1
18	Saint Lucia	0	0	1	1
Totals (19 entries)		32	31	27	90
