= James Tomlinson (discus thrower) =

British discus thrower (born 2000)

Personal information
- Nationality: British (Welsh)
- Born: 11 January 2000 (age 26)

Sport
- Sport: Athletics
- Event: Discus
- Club: Birchfield Harriers

Achievements and titles
- Personal best: Discus: 63.18 m (2026)
Medal record
Men's athletics
Representing Wales
Commonwealth Youth Games
Silver medal – second place	2017 Nassau	Discus

James Tomlinson (born 11 January 2000) is a British discus thrower from Wales. A successful junior, he is the British under-18 record holder.

== Biography ==
From Pembroke Dock, Tomlinson took up discus as a junior athlete and won his first Wales Schools Championship in 2014. He qualified for the World U18 Championships as a 15 year-old but was too young to be able to compete in the discipline.

He became the British under-18 discus record holder in 2017 while competing at Loughborough International, recording a distance of 63.48m with the 1.5 kg disc. He was a silver medalist behind Connor Bell of New Zealand at the 2017 Commonwealth Youth Games in the Bahamas, with a best measured throw of 60.11 metres, although suffered misfortunate when his final throw could not be measured after it struck a judge.

Tomlinson later attended Pembrokeshire College. Competing for Pembrokeshire Harriers, Tomlinson broke the Welsh under-20 discus record at the Cardiff Throws Open with 60.24 metres in August 2019. Later that month, he then broke British under-20 discus record with 61.64 metres, surpassing the previous record of 60.46m that had been held by Brett Morse since 2008.

Later a member of Birchfield Harriers, he threw a personal best of 57.30 metres in 2023. He won the England Athletics senior championships in July 2024 in Birmingham with a best throw of 57.23 metres, and placed fourth that year at the 2024 British Athletics Championships in Manchester.

Competing in Ramona, Oklahoma at The Oklahoma Throws Series World Invitational event in April 2026, Tomlinson made a succession of throws that landed over 60 metres, first throwing 60.80 m before improving his best distance to 61.15 m, and then to a new personal best of 63.18 m. Tomlinson placed second competing for Wales in the discus at the 2026 Loughborough International in May.
