= Athletics at the 2011 European Youth Summer Olympic Festival =

The athletics competition at the 2011 European Youth Summer Olympic Festival was held from 25 to 29 July 2011. The events took place at the Söğütlü Athletics Stadium in Trabzon, Turkey. Boys and girls born 1994 or 1995 or later participated 36 track and field events, divided evenly between the sexes.

The five-day competition was preceded by the 2011 World Youth Championships in Athletics and a number of athletes participated at both meetings. Bence Pásztor of Hungary set a world youth best of 84.41 metres to win the boy's hammer throw, while Yuriy Kushniruk of Ukraine set a European youth best in the javelin throw (his mark of 83.42 m was second only to Argentina's Braian Toledo).

Internationally, the championships was evenly matched and no one country dominated as 26 nations had a medal-winning athlete. Three countries each attained a total of ten medals: Great Britain topped the medal table with five gold medals and four silvers, Ukraine was a close runner-up with five gold and three silvers, while Russia came third with four golds. France and Italy were also strong performers, with totals of nine and eight medals, respectively.

== Medal summary ==
=== Boys ===
Event	Gold		Silver		Bronze	
100 m	Daniel Kölsch; Germany	10.66; PB	Leon Reid; Great Britain	10.68	Marek Bakalar; Czech Republic	10.75
200 m	Thomas Holligan; Great Britain	21.46; PB	Ilya Siratsiuk; Belarus	21.55	Marek Bakalar; Czech Republic	21.57; PB
400 m	Clovis Asong; Great Britain	46.93	Steffen Dale Trenk; Germany	48.74	Aliaksandr Krasouski; Belarus	48.91
800 m	Brecht Bertels; Belgium	1:50.90; PB	Nemanja Kojić; Serbia	1:51.55; PB	Karl John Griffin; Ireland	1:51.64
1500 m	Ruairi Finnegan; Ireland	3:53.78	Samuele Dini; Italy	3:54.45	James Lamswood; Great Britain	3:55.02
3000 m	Bohdan-Ivan Horodyskyi; Ukraine	8:21.99; PB	Gordon Benson; Great Britain	8:23.05	Lorenzo Dini; Italy	8:24.20; PB
2000 m St.	Gonzalo Basconcelo; Spain	5:54.60; PB	Italo Quazzola; Italy	5:56.30; PB	Johannes Max. Motschmann; Germany	5:57.37; PB
110 m H (91.4 cm)	Lorenzo Perini; Italy	13.44; CR	Wilhem Belocian; France	13.50; PB	Thomas Durant; Belgium	13.56; PB
400 m H (84.0 cm)	Ben Kiely; Ireland	52.69; PB	Jacob Paul; Great Britain	52.80; PB	Vladislav Tsygankov; Russia	53.01; PB
4 × 100 m relay	France; Jean-Noël Crétinoir; Mickaël Zézé; Gautier Dautremer; Wilhem Belocian	40.90	Great Britain; James Taylor; Thomas Holligan; Clovis Asong; Leon Reid	41.37	Belgium; Oumar Diallo; Bram Luycx; Mathias Broothaerts; Lorijn Verbrughhe	41.60
High jump	Gaël Rotardier; France	2.11 m	Falk Wendrich; Germany	2.08 m PB	Pavel Kipra; Belarus	2.08 m
Long jump	Elliot Safo; Great Britain	7.38 m PB	Stefano Braga; Italy	7.36 m	Semen Popov; Russia	7.36 m
Triple jump	Robert Clarke; Switzerland	15.50 m PB	Lasha Gulelauri; Georgia	15.49 m	Jean-Noël Crétinoir; France	15.49 m
Pole vault	Robert Renner; Slovenia	5.31 m CR	Torben Laidig; Germany	5.00 m PB	Georgiy Bykov; Ukraine	4.95 m
Shot put (5 kg)	Vladyslav Chernikov; Ukraine	20.13 m	Matti Sivonen; Finland	19.43 m PB	Mesud Pezer; Bosnia and Herzegovina	19.13 m
Discus (1.5 kg)	Dominik Kosar; Czech Republic	56.04 m	Vladyslav Chernikov; Ukraine	55.40 m	Martin Pilato; Italy	55.34 m
Hammer throw (5 kg)	Bence Pásztor; Hungary	84.41 m WYB	Sergiy Reheda; Ukraine	80.81 m PB	Ozkan Baltaci; Turkey	78.90 m PB
Javelin (700 g)	Yuriy Kushniruk; Ukraine	83.42 m WYL	Sebastian Teikari; Finland	75.43 m SB	Povilas Dabasinskas; Lithuania	73.23 m PB
WR world record | AR area record | CR championship record | GR games record | NR national record | OR Olympic record | PB personal best | SB season best | WL world leading (in a given season)

=== Girls ===
Event	Gold		Silver		Bronze	
100 m	Sophie Papps; Great Britain	11.82	Samantha Dagry; Switzerland	11.91; PB	Solenn Compper; France	11.99
200 m	Ekaterina Renzhina; Russia	23.64; CR	Justien Grillet; Belgium	23.94	Anna Hämäläinen; Finland	24.14
400 m	Modesta Morauskaite; Lithuania	54.07; PB	Kimberley Efonye; Belgium	54.30; PB	Barbara Camblor; Spain	55.03
800 m	Olena Sidorska; Ukraine	2:05.26; CR	Camilla de Bleecker; Belgium	2:05.74	Luna Udelhoven; Germany	2:07.30; PB
1500 m	Sophie Riches; Great Britain	4:25.95	Síofra Cléirigh Büttner; Ireland	4:26.42; PB	Meropi Panayiotou; Cyprus	4:29.13; PB
3000 m	Alena Kudashkina; Russia	9:18.46	Anca Maria Bunea; Romania	9:30.81; PB	Jip Vastenburg; Netherlands	9:39.47
2000 m St.	Dana Elena Loghin; Romania	6:40.93; CR	Johanna Christine Schulz; Germany	6:46.49; PB	Olja Nikolić; Serbia	6:48.05; PB
100 m H (76.2 cm)	Nadine Visser; Netherlands	13.28; PB	Monika Zapalska; Germany	13.52; PB	Sarah Kate Lavin; Ireland	13.62; PB
400 m H (76.2 cm)	Katsiaryna Verameyenka; Belarus	59.57; PB	Emeline Bauwe; France	1:00.42; PB	Megan Kiely; Ireland	1:00.44; PB
4 × 100 m relay	Netherlands; Tessa van Schagen; Sacha van Agt; Naomi Sedney; Nadine Visser	45.93	Belgium; Sarah Missinne; Justien Grillet; Orphee Depuydt; Kimberley Efonye	46.12	Russia; Anastasia Nikolaeva; Elizaveta Anikienko; Anastasiia Aslanidi; Ekaterina Renzhina	46.58
High jump	Dior Delophont; France	1.85 m PB	Leontia Kallenou; Cyprus	1.79 m	Ligia Damaris Grozav; Romania	1.79 m
Pole vault	Roberta Bruni; Italy	4.10 m CR	Georgia Stefanidi; Greece	4.10 m	Kristina Bondarenko; Russia	4.10 m
Long jump	Maryna Bekh; Ukraine	6.25 m	Julia Gerter; Germany	6.14 m	Marina Buchelnikova; Russia	6.11 m
Triple jump	Ana Peleteiro; Spain	13.17 m PB	Sokhna Galle; France	13.11 m	Anna Krasutska; Ukraine	13.00 m
Shot put (4 kg)	Natalia Shirobokova; Russia	14.23 m	Charlene Okken; Netherlands	13.84 m PB	Monia Cantarella; Italy	13.67 m
Discus (1 kg)	Florentia Kalogeraki; Greece	48.31 m	Natalia Shirobokova; Russia	48.31 m	Ozge Yilmaz; Turkey	44.72 m
Hammer throw (4 kg)	Hanna Zinchuk; Belarus	59.48 m	Alyona Shamotina; Ukraine	59.23 m PB	Petra Jakeljić; Croatia	56.35 m
Javelin (600 g)	Alina Gerasimchuk; Russia	53.86 m CR	Liveta Jasiunaite; Lithuania	52.00 m PB	Alexie Alaïs; France	50.94 m
WR world record | AR area record | CR championship record | GR games record | NR national record | OR Olympic record | PB personal best | SB season best | WL world leading (in a given season)

== Medal table ==
* Host nation (Turkey)

Rank	Nation	Gold	Silver	Bronze	Total
1	Great Britain	5	4	1	10
2	Ukraine	5	3	2	10
3	Russia	4	1	5	10
4	France	3	3	3	9
5	Italy	2	3	3	8
6	Ireland	2	1	3	6
7	Belarus	2	1	2	5
8	Netherlands	2	1	1	4
9	Spain	2	0	1	3
10	Germany	1	6	2	9
11	Belgium	1	4	2	7
12	Lithuania	1	1	1	3
12	Romania	1	1	1	3
14	Greece	1	1	0	2
14	Switzerland	1	1	0	2
16	Czech Republic	1	0	2	3
17	Hungary	1	0	0	1
17	Slovenia	1	0	0	1
19	Finland	0	2	1	3
20	Cyprus	0	1	1	2
20	Serbia	0	1	1	2
22	Georgia	0	1	0	1
23	Turkey*	0	0	2	2
24	Bosnia and Herzegovina	0	0	1	1
24	Croatia	0	0	1	1
Totals (25 entries)		36	36	36	108

== See also ==
- European Youth Olympic Festival
