= LaKeisha Lawson =

American athlete

LaKeisha Moore
Personal information
- Nationality: American
- Born: June 3, 1987 (age 39) San Pedro, Los Angeles
- Height: 5 ft 6 in (1.68 m)
- Weight: 130 lb (59 kg)

Sport
- Country: United States
- Sport: Track and field
- Event(s): 60m, 100m, 200m
- College team: UNLV Rebels
- Club: Adidas
- Turned pro: 2009
Medal record
Women's athletics
Representing the United States
World Relay Championships
Gold medal – first place	2014 Nassau	4×100 m relay

LaKeisha Moore (born June 3, 1987) is an American sprinter. She competed in the 60 metres event at the 2014 IAAF World Indoor Championships.

== Professional career ==
Coach Lekeisha Moore enters was named the head coach at Cal State Dominguez Hills Toros in 2024.

After spending three seasons (2021 - 2024) as the track and field assistant coach with Claremont-Mudd-Scripps Stags and Athenas. Moore was named the U.S. Track & Field and Cross Country Coaches Association Men's Track and Field West Region Assistant Coach of the Year in 2023, after having a key role in the performance of the CMS sprinters.

In particular, Christian Campbell was the SCIAC Track Athlete of the Year after setting Southern California Intercollegiate Athletic Conference records in the 100 and 200 meters, breaking CMS standards that had stood for 35 years. The Stags also broke school records in the 4x100 and 4x400 relays, with the 4x400 team recording the fourth-fastest time in Division III history at the NCAA Division III Championships to earn second place .

Moore graduated from the University of Nevada-Las Vegas with a degree in journalism in 2009 and is a native of Victorville, California. Her husband, Carlos Moore, is a former World and National Junior Championship sprinter for USA Track and Field.

Moore coached with CYP Training and helped put multiple high school athletes in state meets, as well as contributing to scholarships earned by most of the athletes involved in the CYP sprint group over her six seasons. She also served as the head coach at Glendora and Bonita High Schools, coaching top sprint teams through CIF Championships.

== International competitions ==
Year	Competition	Venue	Position	Event	Notes
2014	2014 IAAF World Indoor Championships – Women's 60 metres	Ergo Arena in Sopot, Poland	10th	60 m	7.18
2014	2014 IAAF World Relays – Women's 4 × 100 metres relay	Thomas Robinson Stadium in Nassau, Bahamas	1st	4×100 m relay	41.88
2015	Athletics at the 2015 Pan American Games – Women's 4 × 100 metres relay	York Lions Stadium in Toronto, Ontario, Canada	1st	4×100 m relay	42.58

=== USA Track and field National Championships ===
Year	Competition	Venue	Position	Event	Notes
2012	United States Olympic trials	Eugene, Oregon	18th	100m	11.54
2013	USA Indoor Track and Field Championships	Albuquerque, New Mexico	2nd	60m	7.10
2013	USA Outdoor Track and Field Championships	Des Moines, Iowa	17th	100m	11.17
2014	USA Indoor Track and Field Championships	Albuquerque, New Mexico	2nd	60 m	7.09
2014	USA Outdoor Track and Field Championships	Sacramento, California	3rd	100 m	11.30
2015	USA Outdoor Track and Field Championships	Eugene, Oregon	15th	100m	11.26
2016	USA Indoor Track and Field Championships	Portland, Oregon	9th	60m	7.33
2016	United States Olympic trials	Eugene, Oregon	20th	100m	11.24
2017	USA Indoor Track and Field Championships	Albuquerque, New Mexico	3rd	60m	7.15
2017	USA Outdoor Track and Field Championships	Sacramento, California	24th	100m	11.33
2018	USA Outdoor Track and Field Championships	Des Moines, Iowa	11th	100m	11.21

== College ==
LaKeisha Lawson earned all-Mountain West Conference honors in 2006, 2008 and 2009 seasons representing UNLV. Lawson earned silver medals in MWC 100 meters, 200 meters outdoor, 60 meters and 200 meters indoor in 2009.
