= Athletics at the Commonwealth Youth Games =

Athletics is one of several sports contested at the quadrennial Commonwealth Youth Games. It has featured at every edition of the competition since its inauguration in 2000. Athletes under nineteen years old may compete (in contrast to the usual under-18 format of other youth athletics competitions).

== Editions ==
Games	Year	Host city	Host country
I	2000	Edinburgh	Scotland
II	2004	Bendigo	Australia
III	2008	Pune	India
IV	2011	Douglas	Isle of Man
V	2015	Apia	Samoa
VI	2017	Nassau	Bahamas
VII	2023	Trinidad and Tobago	Trinidad and Tobago

== Games records ==
=== Men ===
Event	Record	Name	Nationality	Date	Games	Place	Ref.
100 m	10.20 (+1.5 m/s)	Tlotliso Leotlela	South Africa	7 September 2015	2015 Games	Apia, Samoa	
200 m	21.06	Julian Thomas	England	December 2004	2004 Games	Bendigo, Australia	
400 m	45.83	Karabo Sibanda	Botswana	September 2015	2015 Games	Apia, Samoa	
800 m	1:46.05	Willy Tarbei	Kenya	September 2015	2015 Games	Apia, Samoa	
1500 m	3:39.80	Kumari Taki	Kenya	September 2015	2015 Games	Apia, Samoa	
3000 m	7:57.03	Wiliam Sitonik	Kenya	11 September 2011	2011 Games	Douglas, Isle of Man	
110 m hurdles (91.4 cm)	13.71	Samuel Bennett	England	22 July 2017	2017 Games	Nassau, Bahamas	
400 m hurdles (84.0 cm)	51.12	Rivaldo Leacock	Barbados	September 2015	2015 Games	Apia, Samoa	
2000 m steeplechase	5:41.81	Zak Seddon	England	10 September 2011	2011 Games	Douglas, Isle of Man	
High jump	2.14 m	Tejaswin Shankar	India	September 2015	2015 Games	Apia, Samoa	
Pole vault	5.25 m	Blake Lucas	Australia	October 2008	2008 Games	Pune, India	
Long jump	7.64 m	Sheldon Noble	Antigua and Barbuda	21 July 2017	2017 Games	Nassau, Bahamas	
Triple jump	16.02 m	Jonathan Moore	England	December 2000	2004 Games	Edinburgh, Scotland	
Shot put (5 kg)	20.12 m	Kevin Nedrick	Jamaica	September 2015	2015 Games	Apia, Samoa	
Discus throw (1.5 kg)	67.44 m	Gerhard de Beer	South Africa	10 September 2011	2011 Games	Douglas, Isle of Man	
Hammer throw	72.19 m	Callum Brown	England	11 September 2011	2011 Games	Douglas, Isle of Man	
Javelin throw (500 g)	81.53 m	Morne Moolman	South Africa	11 September 2011	2011 Games	Douglas, Isle of Man	
4 × 100 m relay	40.85	Ranil Jayawardena; Roshan Chamara Silva; Keith de Mel; Shehan Abeyptiya	Sri Lanka	October 2008	2008 Games	Pune, India	
4 × 200 m relay	1:28.35	Ojeikere Precious Omokheoa; Itsekiri Usheoritse Ese; Idjesa Uruemu; Adeyemi Sikiru	Nigeria	September 2015	2015 Games	Apia, Samoa	
4 × 400 m relay	3:13.32	Jithin Paul; Dharambir; Singh Inderjeet; Parveen Kumar	India	October 2008	2008 Games	Pune, India	

=== Women ===
Event	Record	Name	Nationality	Date	Games	Place	Ref.
100 m	11.46	Shaunna Thompson	England	October 2008	2008 Games	Pune, India	
200 m	23.42	Shaunna Thompson	England	October 2008	2008 Games	Pune, India	
200 m	23.42	Riley Day	Australia	23 July 2017	2017 Games	Nassau, Bahamas	
400 m	52.97	Racheal Nachula	Zambia	October 2008	2008 Games	Pune, India	
800 m	2:02.30	Phoebe Gill	England	10 August 2023	2023 Games	Port of Spain, Trinidad and Tobago	
1500 m	4:12.38	Nancy Cherop	Kenya	8 August 2023	2023 Games	Port of Spain, Trinidad and Tobago	
3000 m	9:06.01	Mercy Cherono	Kenya	October 2008	2008 Games	Pune, India	
100 m hurdles (76.2 cm)	13.18 (+1.6 m/s)	Taylon Bieldt	South Africa	September 2015	2015 Games	Apia, Samoa	
400 m hurdles	59.40	Johnelle Thomas	Jamaica	23 July 2017	2017 Games	Nassau, Bahamas	
2000 m steeplechase	6:28.10	Norah Jeruto Tanui	Kenya	9 September 2011	2011 Games	Douglas, Isle of Man	
High jump	1.83 m	Sommer Lecky	Northern Ireland	23 July 2017	2017 Games	Nassau, Bahamas	
Pole vault	4.05 m	Jade Ive	England	October 2008	2008 Games	Pune, India	
Long jump	6.19 m	Holly Mills	England	20 July 2017	2017 Games	Nassau, Bahamas	
Triple jump	13.11 m	Shardha Ghule	India	October 2008	2008 Games	Pune, India	
Shot put (3 kg)	17.82 m	Trinity Tutti	Canada	20 July 2017	2017 Games	Nassau, Bahamas	
Discus throw	50.71 m	Taylah Sengul	Australia	9 September 2011	2011 Games	Douglas, Isle of Man	
Hammer throw	58.43 m	Sophie Hitchon	England	October 2008	2008 Games	Pune, India	
Javelin throw (500 g)	51.99 m	Annabel Thomson	Australia	December 2004	2004 Games	Bendigo, Australia	
4 × 100 m relay	45.63	Joscelynn Hopeson; Johnelle Gibbons; Joey Duck; Lucy Sargent	England	December 2004	2004 Games	Bendigo, Australia	
4 × 200 m relay	1:41.60	Adiakerehwa Blessing; Uche Brown; Etim Aniekeme Alphonsus; Abolaji Omotayo Oluwaseun	Nigeria	September 2015	2015 Games	Apia, Samoa	
4 × 400 m relay	3:42.02	Chinchu Jose; Anu Mariam Jose; Arya Charivila; M. R. Poovamma	India	October 2008	2008 Games	Pune, India	

=== Mixed ===
Event	Record	Name	Nationality	Date	Games	Place	Ref.
4 × 100 m relay	43.19	Riley Day; Ella Connolly; Ben Schmidtchen; Jake Doran	Australia	23 July 2017	2017 Games	Nassau, Bahamas	
4 × 200 m relay	1:31.50	Doneisha Anderson; Kayvon Stubbs; Joel Johnson; Shaquiel Higgs	Bahamas	23 July 2017	2017 Games	Nassau, Bahamas	
4 × 400 m relay	3:22.07	Malachi Austin; Narissa McPherson; Javon Roberts; Tianna Springer	Guyana	10 August 2023	2023 Games	Port of Spain, Trinidad and Tobago	
