= Tatiana Aholou =

Canadian hurdler (born 2000)

Personal information
- Born: 26 November 2000 (age 25)

Sport
- Sport: Athletics
- Event: Hurdler

Achievements and titles
- Personal bests: 60m hurdles: 8.01 (Boston, 2025); 100m hurdles: 12.66 (London, 2026)
Medal record
Women's athletics
Representing Canada
Pan American Championships
Silver medal – second place	2026 Medellín	100 m hurdles
NACAC Championships
Silver medal – second place	2025 Freeport	100 m hurdles
Commonwealth Youth Games
Silver medal – second place	2017 Bahamas	Long jump

Tatiana Aholou (born 26 November 2000) is a Canadian high hurdler.

== Early life ==
From Laval, Quebec, she attended Collège Stanislas. She participated in gymnastics and soccer before focusing on athletics. She won two age-group gold medals at the 2015 Canadian Outdoor Championships, winning the long jump and the 100 metres.

== Career ==
She is a member of the Club d'athétisme Dynamique de Laval (CADL) in Laval, Quebec and set area records as a junior athlete. She was a silver medalist in the long jump at the 2017 Youth Commonwealth Games in Nassau, Bahamas, where she also competed in the 100 metres. She was the 2018 New Balance Nationals Indoor long jump champion. She later attended the University of Kentucky and transferring to Iowa State University in 2020.

She finished in third place in the 100 metres hurdles at the 2023 and 2024 Canadian Track and Field Championships. She was selected for the 60 metres hurdles at the 2025 World Athletics Indoor Championships in Nanjing, China, in March 2025. She was a silver medalist in the 100 metres hurdles at the 2025 NACAC Championships in Freeport, The Bahamas in 13.01 seconds (-1.1). She competed at the 2025 World Athletics Championships in Tokyo, Japan.

In June 2026, she won the silver medal in the 100 metres hurdles at the inaugural 2026 Pan American Championships in Medellín. She was a finalist competing in the 100 metres hurdles at the 2026 Commonwealth Games in Glasgow, Scotland, placing sixth overall.
