= Athletics at the 2017 Commonwealth Youth Games =

Athletics at the VI Commonwealth Youth Games
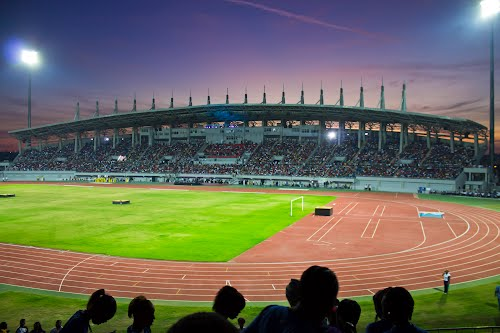
- Dates: 20–23 July
- Host city: Nassau, Bahamas
- Venue: Thomas Robinson Stadium
- Level: U18
- Events: 29
- Participation: 309 athletes

Athletics was one of the nine sports of the 2017 Commonwealth Youth Games. The events were staged at the Thomas Robinson Stadium in Nassau, Bahamas between 20 and 23 July, shortly after the 2017 World U18 Championships in Athletics.

== Medal summary ==
=== Boys ===
Event	Gold		Silver		Bronze	
100 metres	Adell Colthrust; Trinidad and Tobago	10.55	Kevon Stone; Jamaica	10.59	Adrian Curry; Bahamas	10.61
200 metres	Aaron Sexton; Northern Ireland	21.57	Danel Mahautière; Dominica	21.61	Chad Miller; England	21.65
400 metres	Kennedy Luchembe; Zambia	47.63	Vaughn Taylor; Canada	47.92	Ramone Lindo; Jamaica	48.01
800 metres	Alex Botterill; England	1:52.22	Jordan Doris; Australia	1:52.82	Joshua Allen; England	1:53.09
1500 metres	John Mwangi Waweru; Kenya	3:48.86	Joshua Lay; England	3:49.35	Luke Duffy; England	3:49.70
3000 metres	Edwin Kiplagat Bett; Kenya	8:23.96	Joshua Desouza; Canada	8:35.15	Francis Damasi; Tanzania	8:37.51
110 metres hurdles (91.4 cm)	Samuel Bennett; England	13.71 GR	Jack Sumners; England	13.85	Denvaughn Whymns; Bahamas	13.88
400 metres hurdles (84.0 cm)	Alastair Chalmers; Guernsey	51.22	Seamus Derbyshire; England	52.00	Boitumelo Mayo; South Africa	52.20
High jump	Sean Szalek; Australia	2.11	Samual Hall; Canada	2.09	Shaun Miller; Bahamas	2.01
Long jump	Sheldon Noble; Antigua and Barbuda	7.64 GR	Benjamin Schmidtchen; Australia	7.54	Denvaughn Whymns; Bahamas	7.15
Shot put (5 kg)	Alexander Kolesnikoff; Australia	19.76	Nicholas Palmer; New Zealand	19.57	Cobe Graham; Jamaica	17.80
Discus throw (1.5 kg)	Connor Bell; New Zealand	63.17	James Tomlinson; Wales	60.11	Djimon Gumbs; British Virgin Islands	56.24
Javelin throw (500 g)	Neil Janse Van Rensburg; Australia	74.19	Tyriq Horsford; Trinidad and Tobago	69.43	Oscar Sullivan; Australia	66.23

=== Girls ===
Event	Gold		Silver		Bronze	
100 metres	Julien Alfred; Saint Lucia	11.56	Riley Day; Australia	11.59	Deondra Green; Canada	11.62
200 metres	Riley Day; Australia	23.42 =GR	Beyoncé Defreitas; British Virgin Islands	23.88	Ella Connolly; Australia	24.09
400 metres	Bendere Oboya; Australia	52.69	Ella Connolly; Australia	52.72	Amber Anning; England	53.68
800 metres	Carley Thomas; Australia	2:05.04	Anna Burt; England	2:05.31	Aurora Rynda; Canada	2:06.38
1500 metres	Erin Wallace; Scotland	4:16.61 GR	Emmaculate Chepkirui; Kenya	4:16.73	Katrina Robinson; New Zealand	4:17.19
3000 metres	Emmaculate Chepkirui; Kenya	9:25.20	Katrina Robinson; New Zealand	9:27.40	Brogan MacDougall; Canada	9:29.34
100 metres hurdles (76.2 cm)	Shanette Allison; Jamaica	13.26	Lateisha Willis; Australia	13.55	Katarina Vlahovic; Canada	13.58
400 metres hurdles	Johnelle Thomas; Jamaica	59.40 GR	Sharelle Samuel; Canada	59.59	Terice Steen; Jamaica	1:00.68
High jump	Sommer Lecky; Northern Ireland	1.83 GR	Emily Whelan; Australia	1.79	Imogen Skelton; New Zealand	1.76
Long jump	Holly Mills; England	6.19 GR	Tatiana Aholou; Canada	5.97	Lucy Hadaway; England	5.67
Shot put (3 kg)	Trinity Tutti; Canada	17.82 GR	Sarah Omoregie; Wales	16.74	Styliana Kyriakidou; Cyprus	15.57
Discus throw	Trinity Tutti; Canada	49.57	Tatiana Kaumoana; New Zealand	45.54	Dolly Gabri; Canada	44.70
Javelin throw (500 g)	Josephine Lalam; Uganda	51.89	Ellie Bowyer; Australia	50.64	Emma Howe; England	47.04

=== Mixed ===
Event	Gold		Silver		Bronze	
Mixed 4 × 100 metres relay	Australia; Riley Day; Ella Connolly; Ben Schmidtchen; Jake Doran	43.19	Jamaica; Kevon Stone; David Tomilson; Anna-Kay Allen; Shanette Allison	43.62	Bahamas; Marissa White; Tylar Lightbourne; Kristin Major; Joel Johnson	43.83
Mixed 4 × 200 metres relay	Bahamas; Doneisha Anderson; Kayvon Stubbs; Joel Johnson; Shaquiel Higgs	1:31.50	England; Vera Chinedu; Georgina Adam; Chad Miller; Samuel Bennett	1:31.77	Botswana	1:33.51
Mixed 4 × 400 metres relay	Australia; Bendere Oboya; Sebastien Moir; Carley Thomas; Jordan Doris	3:25.08 AU18B	England; Emma Alderson; Amber Anning; Alex Botterill; Joshua Faulds	3:25.45	Bahamas; Doneisha Anderson; Wendira Moss; Corey Sherrod; Tyrell Simms	3:34.06

== Medal table ==
* Host nation (Bahamas)

Rank	Nation	Gold	Silver	Bronze	Total
1	Australia (AUS)	8	7	2	17
2	England (ENG)	3	6	6	15
3	Kenya (KEN)	3	1	0	4
4	Canada (CAN)	2	5	5	12
5	Jamaica (JAM)	2	2	3	7
6	Northern Ireland (NIR)	2	0	0	2
7	New Zealand (NZL)	1	3	2	6
8	Trinidad and Tobago (TTO)	1	1	0	2
9	Bahamas (BAH)*	1	0	6	7
10	Antigua and Barbuda (ATG)	1	0	0	1
10	Guernsey (GUE)	1	0	0	1
10	Saint Lucia (LCA)	1	0	0	1
10	Scotland (SCO)	1	0	0	1
10	Uganda (UGA)	1	0	0	1
10	Zambia (ZAM)	1	0	0	1
16	Wales (WAL)	0	2	0	2
17	British Virgin Islands (IVB)	0	1	1	2
18	Dominica (DMA)	0	1	0	1
19	Botswana (BOT)	0	0	1	1
19	Cyprus (CYP)	0	0	1	1
19	South Africa (RSA)	0	0	1	1
19	Tanzania (TAN)	0	0	1	1
Totals (22 entries)		29	29	29	87
