= 2014 IAAF World Indoor Championships – Women's 60 metres =

Women's 60 metres at the 2014 IAAF World Indoor Championships
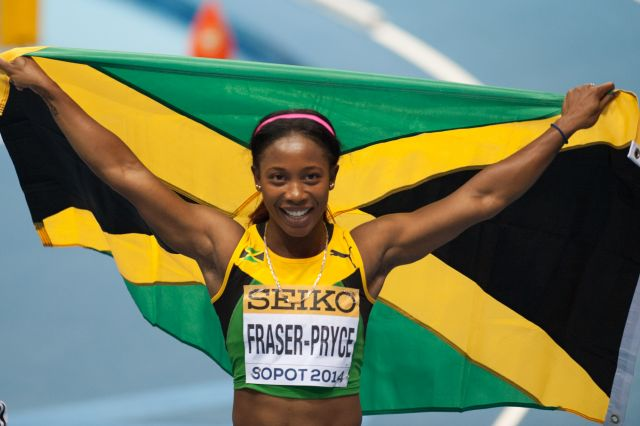
- Shelly-Ann Fraser-Pryce after winning the final.
- Venue: Ergo Arena
- Dates: 8 March (heats); 9 March (semifinals and final)
- Competitors: 43 from 36 nations
- Winning time: 6.98 WL

Medalists
gold medal	Shelly-Ann Fraser-Pryce	Jamaica
silver medal	Murielle Ahouré	Ivory Coast
bronze medal	Tianna Bartoletta	United States

The women's 60 metres at the 2014 IAAF World Indoor Championships took place on 8–9 March 2014.

== Records ==
Standing records prior to the 2014 IAAF World Indoor Championships
World record	Irina Privalova (RUS)	6.92	Madrid, Spain	11 February 1993
World record	Irina Privalova (RUS)	6.92	Madrid, Spain	9 February 1995
Championship record	Gail Devers (USA)	6.95	Toronto, Canada	12 March 1993
World leading	Murielle Ahouré (CIV)	7.03	Houston, United States	1 February 2014
African record	Murielle Ahouré (CIV)	6.99	Birmingham, England	16 February 2013
Asian record	Susanthika Jayasinghe (SRI)	7.09	Stuttgart, Germany	17 February 1999
European record	Irina Privalova (RUS)	6.92	Madrid, Spain	11 February 1993
European record	Irina Privalova (RUS)	6.92	Madrid, Spain	9 February 1995
North and Central American and Caribbean record	Gail Devers (USA)	6.95	Toronto, Canada	12 March 1993
North and Central American and Caribbean record	Marion Jones (USA)	6.95	Maebashi, Japan	7 March 1998
Oceanian record	Sally McLellan (AUS)	7.30	Boston, United States	7 February 2009
South American record	Franciela Krasucki (BRA)	7.19	São Caetano do Sul, Brazil	16 February 2014
Records broken during the 2014 IAAF World Indoor Championships
World Leading	Shelly-Ann Fraser-Pryce (JAM)	6.98	Sopot, Poland	9 March 2014

== Qualification standards ==
Indoor	Outdoor
7.32	11.20 (100 m)

== Schedule ==
Date	Time	Round
March 8, 2014	10:40	Heats
March 9, 2014	15:15	Semifinals
March 9, 2014	18:05	Final

== Results ==
=== Heats ===
Qualification: First 3 in each heat (Q) and the next 6 fastest (q) qualified for the semifinal.

Rank	Heat	Lane	Name	Nationality	Time	Notes
1	6	4	Murielle Ahouré	Côte d'Ivoire	7.09	Q
2	2	3	Shelly-Ann Fraser-Pryce	Jamaica	7.12	Q
=3	3	3	Tianna Bartoletta	United States	7.13	Q
=3	4	3	Verena Sailer	Germany	7.13	Q
5	3	8	Michelle-Lee Ahye	Trinidad and Tobago	7.14	Q
6	1	4	Asha Philip	Great Britain	7.18	Q
=7	5	2	Gloria Asumnu	Nigeria	7.19	Q, SB
=7	5	5	LaKeisha Lawson	United States	7.19	Q
=7	1	6	Dafne Schippers	Netherlands	7.19	Q
=7	4	6	Ezinne Okparaebo	Norway	7.19	Q
=7	5	8	Ruddy Zang Milama	Gabon	7.19	Q
12	2	8	Tahesia Harrigan-Scott	British Virgin Islands	7.20	Q
=13	6	8	Sophie Papps	Great Britain	7.22	Q, PB
=13	4	4	Veronica Campbell-Brown	Jamaica	7.22	Q, SB
15	6	5	Franciela Krasucki	Brazil	7.25	Q
16	2	7	Yasmin Kwadwo	Germany	7.27	Q
17	1	8	Nataliya Pohrebnyak	Ukraine	7.30	Q
=18	6	6	Anna Kiełbasińska	Poland	7.31	q, =PB
=18	1	7	Sheniqua Ferguson	Bahamas	7.31	q, SB
20	2	6	Wei Yongli	China	7.32	q, SB
=21	4	2	Marta Jeschke	Poland	7.33	q
=21	2	4	Hanna-Maari Latvala	Finland	7.33	q
23	4	8	Jamile Samuel	Netherlands	7.34	q
=24	6	3	Audrey Alloh	Italy	7.35	
=24	1	3	Olga Safronova	Kazakhstan	7.35	
26	3	4	Carina Horn	South Africa	7.36	Q
27	3	7	Maria Gatou	Greece	7.38	
28	3	1	LaVerne Jones-Ferrette	U.S. Virgin Islands	7.39	SB
29	4	7	Flings Owusu-Agyapong	Ghana	7.42	
30	5	4	Ramona Papaioannou	Cyprus	7.43	
31	5	7	Geronne Black	Trinidad and Tobago	7.45	
32	3	2	Tiffany Tshilumba	Luxembourg	7.47	
33	2	2	Fong Yee Pui	Hong Kong	7.58	
34	3	5	Joanne Pricilla Loutoy	Seychelles	7.75	PB
35	6	7	Aziza Sbaity	Lebanon	7.82	PB
36	1	2	Estefania Sebastian	Andorra	7.83	
37	3	6	Rachel Fitz	Malta	7.86	PB
38	4	5	Shinelle Proctor	Anguilla	7.91	
39	5	3	Patricia Taea	Cook Islands	7.93	NR
=40	1	5	Lovelite Detenamo	Nauru	7.94	NR
=40	5	6	Martina Pretelli	San Marino	7.94	
42	6	2	Marlene Mevong	Equatorial Guinea	8.05	
43	2	5	Rachel Abrams	Northern Mariana Islands	8.30	PB

=== Semifinals ===
Qualification: First 2 in each heat (Q) and the next 2 fastest (q) qualified for the final.

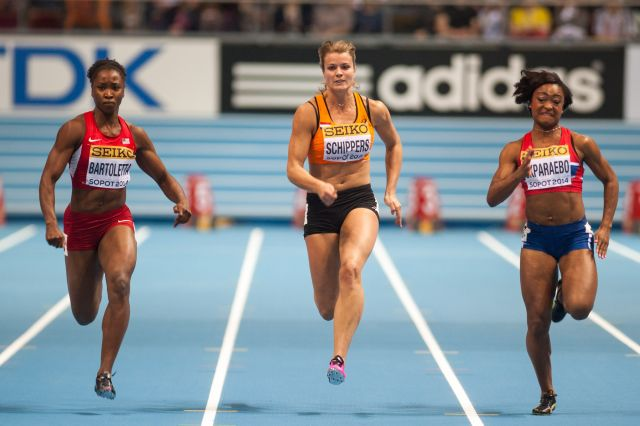
From L to R: Tianna Bartoletta, Dafne Schippers and Ezinne Okparaebo racing in the second semifinal.

Rank	Heat	Lane	Name	Nationality	Time	Notes
1	1	3	Murielle Ahouré	Côte d'Ivoire	7.06	Q
2	3	4	Shelly-Ann Fraser-Pryce	Jamaica	7.08	Q, SB
3	3	3	Asha Philip	Great Britain	7.09	Q, PB
4	3	6	Michelle-Lee Ahye	Trinidad and Tobago	7.10	q, NR
5	1	4	Gloria Asumnu	Nigeria	7.11	Q, SB
6	2	6	Verena Sailer	Germany	7.12	Q, PB
7	2	5	Tianna Bartoletta	United States	7.14	Q
=8	2	8	Veronica Campbell-Brown	Jamaica	7.17	q, SB
=8	3	5	Tahesia Harrigan-Scott	British Virgin Islands	7.17	SB
=10	1	6	LaKeisha Lawson	United States	7.18	
=10	2	4	Dafne Schippers	Netherlands	7.18	
=12	1	8	Ruddy Zang Milama	Gabon	7.19	
=12	2	3	Ezinne Okparaebo	Norway	7.19	
14	1	1	Sheniqua Ferguson	Bahamas	7.25	SB
=15	1	5	Sophie Papps	Great Britain	7.30	
=15	2	1	Wei Yongli	China	7.30	SB
=17	3	8	Franciela Krasucki	Brazil	7.31	
=17	3	1	Anna Kiełbasińska	Poland	7.31	=PB
19	3	7	Yasmin Kwadwo	Germany	7.32	
=20	1	7	Carina Horn	South Africa	7.34	
=20	2	7	Nataliya Pohrebnyak	Ukraine	7.34	
=20	3	2	Hanna-Maari Latvala	Finland	7.34	
23	1	2	Jamile Samuel	Netherlands	7.39	
24	2	2	Marta Jeschke	Poland	7.41	

=== Final ===
Rank	Lane	Name	Nationality	Time	Notes
1st place, gold medalist(s)	5	Shelly-Ann Fraser-Pryce	Jamaica	6.98	WL
2nd place, silver medalist(s)	3	Murielle Ahouré	Côte d'Ivoire	7.01	SB
3rd place, bronze medalist(s)	7	Tianna Bartoletta	United States	7.06	SB
4	4	Asha Philip	Great Britain	7.11	
5	2	Veronica Campbell-Brown	Jamaica	7.13	SB
6	1	Michelle-Lee Ahye	Trinidad and Tobago	7.16	
7	8	Gloria Asumnu	Nigeria	7.18	
8	6	Verena Sailer	Germany	7.18	
