= Connor Bell (athlete) =

New Zealand athlete (born 2001)

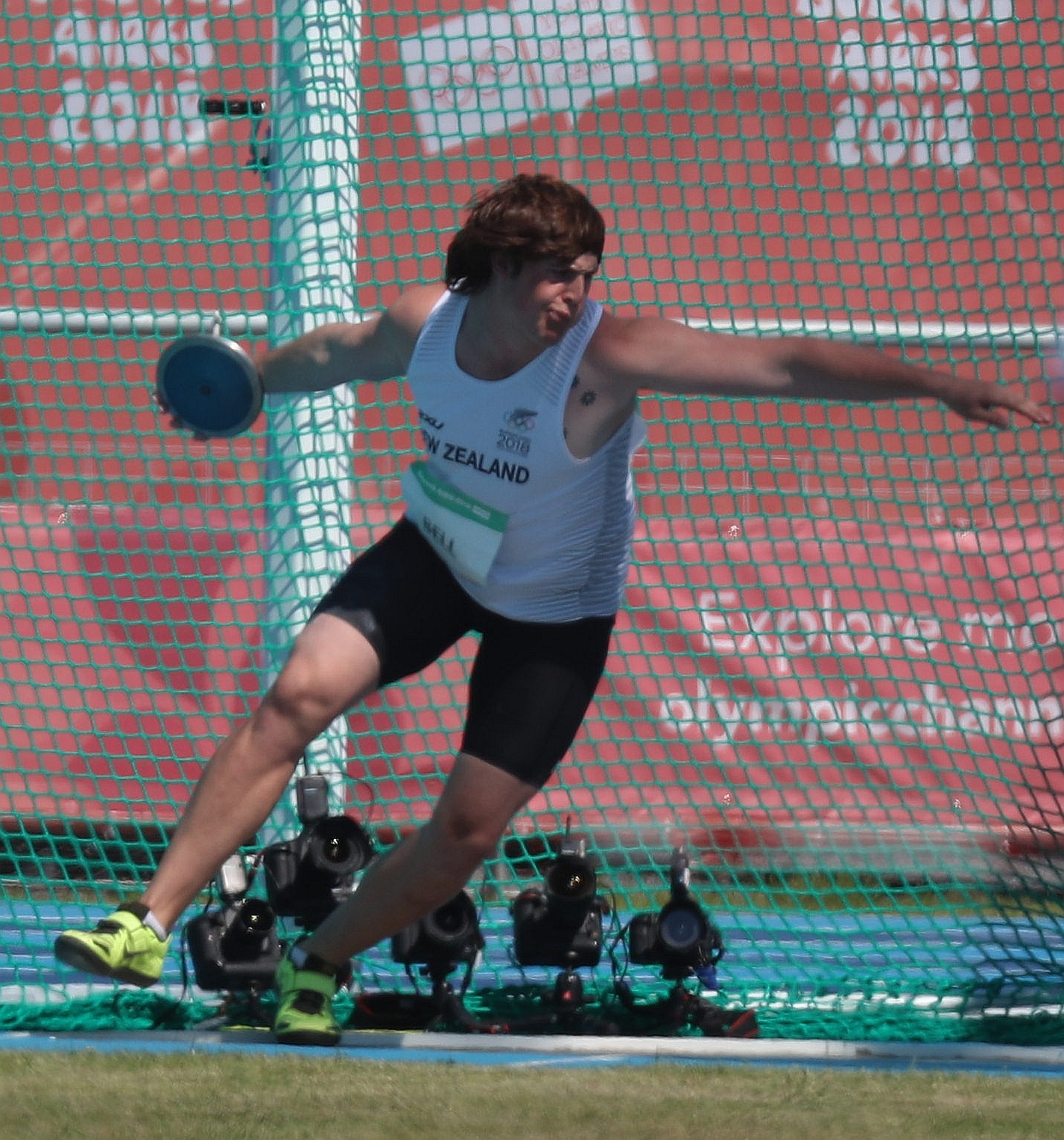
- 2018 Summer Youth Olympics

Personal information
- Born: 21 June 2001 (age 25) Auckland, New Zealand
- Education: Westlake Boys High School
- Height: 192 cm (6 ft 4 in)
- Weight: 104 kg (229 lb)

Sport
- Country: New Zealand
- Sport: Track and Field
- Event: Discus throw

Achievements and titles
- National finals: Discus champion (2021, 2022, 2023, 2024, 2925, 2026)
- Personal bests: Discus throw – 69.51m (Ramona, 2025) NR
Medal record
Men's athletics
Representing New Zealand
Oceania Championships
Gold medal – first place	2022 Mackay	Discus
Commonwealth Youth Games
Gold medal – first place	2017 Bahamas	Discus

Connor Bell (born 21 June 2001) is a New Zealand former field athlete who retired as the national record holder and multiple-time national champion in the discus throw. He represented his country at the 2022 Commonwealth Games and 2024 Olympic Games, and had top-ten finishes at the 2023 and 2025 World Athletics Championships.

== Biography ==
Bell won the gold medal in the discus throw at the 2017 Commonwealth Youth Games in the Bahamas, finishing ahead of James Tomlinson of Wales. On 25 January 2020, at the Potts Classic, Hawkes Bay Sports Park, in Hastings, Bell threw 63.25 m, ranking him 31st in the world for the year. At the same venue, on 23 January 2021, Bell set a new personal best throw of 64.29 m. On 27 March 2021, Bell won the New Zealand national championship with a throw of 61.85. In 2022, Bell repeated his national title win and added a victory at the 2022 Oceania Athletics Championships in Mackay, Australia.

Bell competed in the men's discus throw at the 2022 Commonwealth Games. He was the sixth-placed qualifier for the final, where he finished eighth with a best throw of 60.23 metres.

At the Pre-Potts track and field meeting in Hastings on 18 January 2023, Bell broke the New Zealand national discus throw record, with a distance of 66.14 metres, breaking the previous mark of 65.03 metres set by Ian Winchester in 2002. At the Maurie Plant Meet - Melbourne on 22 February 2023, Bell bettered his own national record with 66.23 metres to win the event ahead of Australian Matthew Denny. The following month, he threw 61.33 metres to win the New Zealand national title in Wellington. In August, he represented New Zealand at the 2023 World Athletics Championships in Budapest, qualifying for the final and placing tenth overall.

Bell won the discus title at the 2024 New Zealand Athletics Championships in Wellington, throwing 57.83 metres. He competed in the discus throw at the 2024 Summer Olympics in Paris in August 2024.

Bell won the discus title at the 2025 New Zealand Athletics Championships in Dunedin, throwing 60.73 metres. He extended the New Zealand national record to 69.51 metres at the Oklahoma Throws Series in Ramona in April 2025. In September 2025, he competed in the discus throw at the 2025 World Championships in Tokyo, Japan, qualifying for the final and placing tenth overall.

Bell won the discus title at the 2026 New Zealand Athletics Championships in Auckland, throwing 59.09 metres. Later that year, Bell announced his retirement from the sport.
