= 2011 World Youth Championships in Athletics – Boys' discus throw =

Boys' discus throw at the 2011 World Youth Championships in Athletics
- Venue: Stadium Lille Métropole
- Dates: 6 July (qualification & final)
- Competitors: 28
- Winning distance: 67.05 WYL

Medalists
gold medal	Fedrick Dacres	Jamaica
silver medal	Ethan Cochran	United States
bronze medal	Gerhard de Beer	South Africa

The boys' discus throw at the 2011 World Youth Championships in Athletics was held at the Stadium Lille Métropole on 6 July.

== Medalists ==
Gold	Silver	Bronze
Fedrick Dacres; Jamaica	Ethan Cochran; United States	Gerhard de Beer; South Africa

== Records ==
Prior to the competition, the following records were as follows.

World Youth Best	Mykyta Nesterenko (UKR)	77.50	Kyiv, Ukraine	19 May 2008
Championship Record	Mykyta Nesterenko (UKR)	70.67	Ostrava, Czech Republic	13 July 2007
World Youth Leading	Fedrick Dacres (JAM)	66.42	Kingston, Jamaica	4 June 2011

== Qualification ==
Qualification rule: qualification standard 57.25 m or at least best 12 qualified.

=== Group A ===
Rank	Name	Nationality	#1	#2	#3	Result	Notes
1	Jan-Louw Kotze	South Africa	56.42	57.95		57.95	Q
2	Viktor Gardenkrans	Sweden	x	57.47		57.47	Q
3	Nicholas Percy	Great Britain	50.51	56.48	53.98	56.48	q
4	Robert Załoga	Poland	46.96	56.08	55.87	56.08	q
5	Philipp Spindler	Germany	55.34	x	52.95	55.34	q
6	Sachin Dalal Singh	India	52.38	54.67	x	54.67	PB
7	Dominik Košař	Czech Republic	53.44	x	53.66	53.66	
8	Marcell Kecskeméty	Hungary	x	52.47	x	52.47	
9	Matti Sivonen	Finland	52.15	x	x	52.15	
10	Iason Thanopoulos	Greece	45.26	51.65	51.86	51.86	
11	Thiago Negreiros	Brazil	44.81	51.56	x	51.56	
12	Aleksandr Dobrenkiy	Russia	x	49.55	46.64	49.55	
13	Roman Yerukh	Ukraine	x	40.89	x	40.89	
	Gian Ragonesi	Peru	x	x	x	NM	

=== Group B ===
Rank	Name	Nationality	#1	#2	#3	Result	Notes
1	Mauricio Ortega	Colombia	52.48	53.11	61.78	61.78	Q, PB
2	Fedrick Dacres	Jamaica	61.57			61.57	Q
3	Gerhard de Beer	South Africa	55.95	x	59.45	59.45	Q
4	János Káplár	Hungary	x	57.95		57.95	Q
5	Ethan Cochran	United States	x	57.13	x	57.13	q
6	Valeriy Pronkin	Russia	56.65	54.37	56.76	56.76	q
7	Martin Pilato	Italy	x	49.68	56.73	56.73	q
8	Yevgeniy Yevgeniy	Kazakhstan	53.97	x	49.60	53.97	
9	Andrea Caiaffa	Italy	45.34	52.31	53.63	53.63	
10	Kristian Periš	Croatia	53.10	50.10	50.65	53.10	PB
11	Ma Shitu	China	46.80	52.64	52.11	52.64	
12	Kostas Kotsanpapas	Greece	48.81	50.34	51.89	51.89	
13	Giovanni Bonilla	Chile	x	47.86	50.42	50.42	
14	Basile Rolnin	France	47.69	x	x	47.69	

== Final ==
Rank	Name	Nationality	#1	#2	#3	#4	#5	#6	Result	Notes
1st place, gold medalist(s)	Fedrick Dacres	Jamaica	63.67	62.05	63.37	64.52	x	67.05	67.05	WYL
2nd place, silver medalist(s)	Ethan Cochran	United States	x	60.37	61.37	x	57.58	x	61.37	PB
3rd place, bronze medalist(s)	Gerhard de Beer	South Africa	59.28	x	56.12	x	60.63	60.16	60.63	PB
4	Mauricio Ortega	Colombia	x	60.28	55.49	x	59.38	x	60.28	
5	Jan-Louw Kotze	South Africa	57.94	55.75	56.46	54.92	59.48	51.30	59.48	
6	Viktor Gardenkrans	Sweden	56.35	x	59.18	58.91	57.66	58.45	59.18	
7	Nicholas Percy	Great Britain	x	58.95	x	x	53.96	54.27	58.95	PB
8	Martin Pilato	Italy	48.91	53.82	57.95	x	x	x	57.95	PB
9	Philipp Spindler	Germany	49.81	56.47	55.57				56.47	
10	Valeriy Pronkin	Russia	56.39	54.49	54.00				56.39	
11	János Káplár	Hungary	56.39	x	x				56.39	
12	Robert Załoga	Poland	x	x	55.86				55.86	
