= Clovis Asong =

British sprinter (born 1994)

Personal information
- Nationality: Great Britain
- Born: 31 October 1994 (age 31)

Sport
- Sport: Running
- Event: 400 metres

Achievements and titles
- Personal best: 400 m: 46.74 s (Trabzon 2011)
Medal record
Men's athletics
Representing Great Britain
European Youth Olympic Festival
Gold medal – first place	2011 Trabzon	400 m
Silver medal – second place	2011 Trabzon	4×100 m relay
Representing England
Commonwealth Youth Games
Gold medal – first place	2011 Douglas	400 m

Clovis Asong (born 31 October 1994) is a former British sprinter who specialised in the 400 metres.

Asong first drew media attention for breaking the United Kingdom Under-15 400 metres record in only his second race.

He won a gold medal in the 400 m at the 2011 Commonwealth Youth Games, beating World Youth Championship silver medalist Alphas Kishoyian. Asong added gold and silver medals at the 2011 European Youth Summer Olympic Festival.

He represented Great Britain at the 2012 World Junior Championships in Athletics.

Despite his early youth-group success, Asong was not able to translate his form into the senior ranks, and raced less regularly after 2014. His last recorded race was a single outing in 2020, aged 25, and he ceased competing thereafter.
