= Geronne Black =

Trinidadian sprinter

Personal information
- Nationality: Trinidadian
- Born: 26 October 1989 (age 36)

Sport
- Sport: Track and field
- Event: 60m

Geronne Black (born 26 October 1989) is a Trinidadian sprinter. She competed in the 60 metres event at the 2014 IAAF World Indoor Championships.

Black competed for the Portland State Vikings track and field program, where she won seven Big Sky Conference titles and qualified for the 2013 NCAA Division I Women's Indoor Track and Field Championships in the 60 metres.
