= Ethan Cochran =

American discus thrower

Personal information
- Nationality: USA
- Born: January 9, 1994 (age 32) Newport Beach, California
- Height: 6 ft 1 in (1.85 m)
- Weight: 210 lb (95 kg)

Sport
- Sport: Track and field
- Event: Discus throw
- College team: California Golden Bears

Achievements and titles
- Personal best: DT (1.5 kg): 61.37 m (Lille 2011) DT (2.0 kg): 57.52 m (2012)
Medal record
Men's Athletics
Representing the United States
World Youth Championships
Silver medal – second place	2011 Lille	Discus throw

Ethan Cochran (born January 9, 1994) is an American discus thrower.

He won a silver medal at the 2011 World Youth Championships in Athletics.

Cochran attended Newport Harbor High School, where he played varsity football until suffering a concussion during his senior season, after which he decided to focus on his track career. He competed for the California Golden Bears between 2013 and 2016 where he broke numerous records which included setting the all-time record for discus throw as a freshman.

He was a USA Today All-American track and field selection in 2012.

Upon retiring from athletics, Cochran founded White Wire LLC a technology startup based in Sheridan, Wyoming.
