= Johannes Pretorius =

South African cricketer (born 1956)

Personal information
- Born: 5 September 1956 (age 70); Cape Town, South Africa
- Source: Cricinfo, 1 December 2020

Johannes Pretorius (born 5 September 1956) is a South African cricketer. He played in one first-class match for Boland in 1983/84.

== See also ==
- List of Boland representative cricketers
