= Athletics at the 2008 Commonwealth Youth Games =

Athletics at the III Commonwealth Youth Games
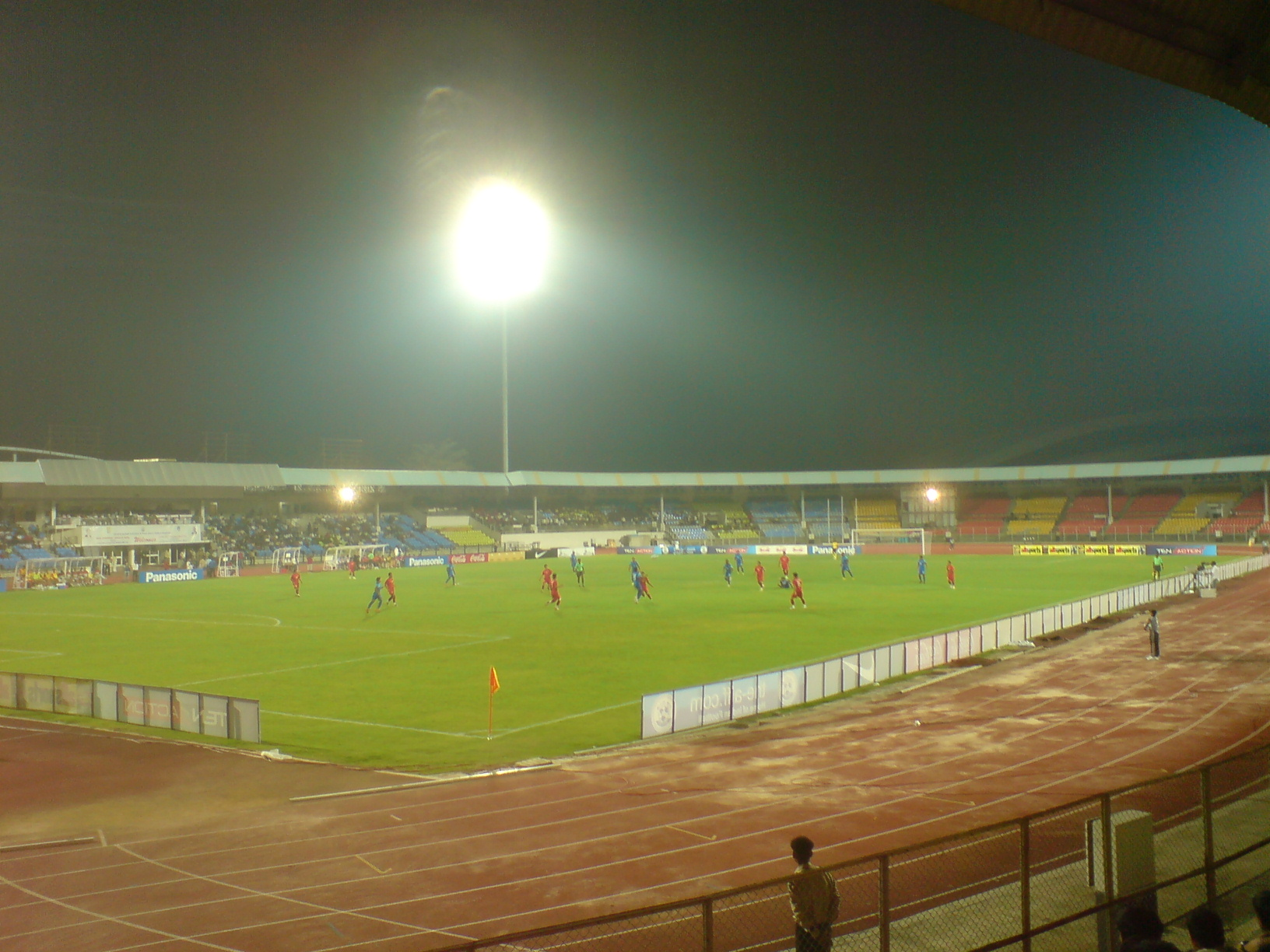
- The host athletics stadium in 2010
- Dates: 14 to 16 October
- Host city: Pune, India
- Venue: Shree Shiv Chhatrapati Sports Complex

At the 2008 Commonwealth Youth Games, the athletics events were held at the Shree Shiv Chhatrapati Sports Complex in Pune, India from 14 to 16 October. A total of 34 events were contested, which were split evenly between the sexes. After the swimming programme, the athletics competition had the next most number of events.

== Medal summary ==
=== Boys ===
Event	Gold		Silver		Bronze	
100 metres	Shehan Abeyptiya; Sri Lanka	10.43 GR	Suwaibou Sanneh; Gambia	10.51	Jason Rogers; Saint Kitts and Nevis	10.52
200 metres	Shehan Abeyptiya; Sri Lanka	21.27	Ray Williams; Australia	21.30	Amiya Mallick; India	21.33
400 metres	Kirani James; Grenada	46.66 GR	Elvis Ukale; Uganda	47.16	Jordan McGrath; England	47.26
800 metres	Windy Jonas; South Africa	1:50.72	Daniel Lagamang; Botswana	1:51.28	David Mutinda; Kenya	1:52.22
1500 metres	Jonathon Ndiku; Kenya	3:45.96 GR	Alex Cherop; Uganda	3:48.41	Windy Cylof Jonas; South Africa	3:48.41
5000 metres	Moses Kibet; Uganda	14:10.86	Dickson Huru; Uganda	14:11.06	Japhet Korir; Kenya	14:11.3
110 metres hurdles	Sam Baines; Australia	13.77 GR	Cornel Fredericks; South Africa	13.99	Jared Bezuidenhout; Australia	14.08
4×100 metres relay	Ranil Jayawardena; Roshan Chamara Silva; Keith de Mel; Shehan Abeyptiya; Sri Lanka	40.85 GR	Mitchell Zlim; Kevin Moore; Jared Bezuidenhout; Sam Baines; Australia	41.08	Simon Leveille; Phillip Hayle; Makinde Oluwasegun; Andre Robert Hamilton; Canada	41.31
4×400 metres relay	Jithin Paul; Dharambir; Singh Inderjeet; Parveen Kumar; India	3:13.32 GR	Dean Swart; Folavia Sehohle; Windy Jonas; Willem Voigt; South Africa	3:14.01	Frazer Wickes; Shaun McFarlane; Tama Toki; Matthew Robinson; New Zealand	41.31
High jump	Willem Voigt; South Africa	2.11	Nikhil Chittarasu; India	2.09	Derek Drouin; Canada	2.09
Pole vault	Blake Lucas; Australia	5.25 GR	Cheyne Damon Rahme; South Africa	5.20	Edward Mourbey; Northern Ireland	4.70
Long jump	Stefan Brits; South Africa	7.38	Rosito Andrews; India	7.24	Azarudeen Buhari; India	7.14
Triple jump	Dheeraj Mishra; India	15.42	Benjamin Williams; England	15.41	Boipelo Rakola Motlhatlhego; South Africa	15.20
Shot put	Curtis Griffith; England	18.56 GR	Stephen Brink; South Africa	18.41	Jasdeep Singh Dhillon; India	18.10
Discus throw	Julian Wruck; Australia	60.88 GR	Curtis Griffith; England	55.35	Arjun Kumar; India	52.02
Hammer throw	Peter Smith; England	68.38	Chandrodaya Singh Narayan; India	67.38	Ajaj Ahmed; India	64.97
Javelin throw	Krishan Tripathi; India	71.52 GR	Rohit Kumar; India	67.60	Luke Bissett; Australia	65.64

=== Girls ===
Event	Gold		Silver		Bronze	
100 metres	Shaunna Thompson; England	11.46 GR	Elly Graf; Australia	11.80	Lauren O'Sullivan; Australia	11.81
200 metres	Shaunna Thompson; England	23.42 GR	Racheal Nachula; Zambia	23.86	Lauren O'Sullivan; Australia	24.14
400 metres	Racheal Nachula; Zambia	52.97 GR	M. R. Poovamma; India	55.17	Rabecca Nachula; Zambia	55.20
800 metres	Caster Semenya; South Africa	2:04.23 GR	Rachel Stringer; England	2:05.71	Lynsey Sharp; Scotland	2:06.77
1500 metres	Stacy Chepkemboi Ndiwa; Kenya	4:20.16 GR	Jessica Parry; Canada	4:20.59	Ciara Mageean; Northern Ireland	4:22.53
3000 metres	Mercy Cherono; Kenya	9:06.01 GR	Doreen Chesang; Uganda	9:35.71	Mary Naali; Tanzania	9:36.63
100 metres hurdles	Kierre Beckles; Barbados	13.88 GR	Gayathri Govindaraj; India	14.00	Brianna Beahan; Australia	14.08
4×100 metres relay	India; Nirupama Sunderraj; Bhagyashri Shirke; Srabani Nanda; Gayathri Govindaraj	46.27	Australia; Brianna Beahan; Lauren O'Sullivan; Elly Graf; Ainsley Ackerman	46.74	Canada; Olivia Charnuski; Loudia Laarman; Alyssa Johnson; Karlene Hurrell Jemmott	46.83
4×400 metres relay	India; Chinchu Jose; Anu Mariam Jose; Arya Charivila; M. R. Poovamma	3:42.02 GR	Canada; Lauren Leon; Karlene Hurrell Jemmott; Jessica Parry; Alyssa Johnson	3:45.46	Australia; Aimie Laube; Alicia Keir; Zoe Mazoudier; Selma Kajan	3:46.10
High jump	Elizabeth Lamb; New Zealand	1.79	Molly Grant; Australia	1.74	Norliyana Kamarudin; Malaysia	1.71
Pole vault	Jade Ive; England	4.05 GR	Ariane Beaumont-Courteau; Canada	3.90	Abi Haywood; England	3.80
Long jump	Abigail Irozuru; England	5.92	Hannah Lewis; Northern Ireland	5.85	Mariah Ririnui; New Zealand	5.80
Triple jump	Shardha Ghule; India	13.11 GR	Gayathri Govindaraj; India	12.89	Ainsley Ackerman; Australia	12.72
Shot put	Julie Labonté; Canada	15.02	Vika Lolo; Australia	14.73	Margaret Satupai; Samoa	14.24
Discus throw	Vika Lolo; Australia	50.49 GR	Margaret Satupai; Samoa	48.43	Shaunagh Brown; England	42.96
Hammer throw	Sophie Hitchon; England	58.43 GR	Maria Badenhorst; South Africa	50.92	Ashleigh Mumberson; Australia	50.87
Javelin throw	Bianca Maurer; Australia	49.87	Pip Charlesworth; New Zealand	46.14	Poonam Rani Jakhar; India	44.25
