= Leonardo Ledgister =

Jamaican athlete (born 1999)

Personal information
- Nationality: Jamaican
- Born: 27 April 1999 (age 27)

Sport
- Sport: Track and Field
- Event: 400m hurdles
- College team: Texas A&M–Corpus Christi Islanders
Medal record
Men's athletics
Representing Jamaica
Commonwealth Youth Games
| Gold medal – first place | 2015 Apia | 4×400m relay |
CARIFTA Games (U18)
| Gold medal – first place | 2015 Basseterre | 4×400 m relay |

Leonardo Ledgister (born 27 April 1999) is a Jamaican athlete who competes in the 400m Hurdles.

== Personal life ==
From Santa Cruz, Jamaica he attended St. Elizabeth Technical High School. He went to Southern University-New Orleans and then to Texas A&M-Corpus Christi.

== Career ==
Ledgister was a finalist at the 2018 World Under-20 Championships in the 400m hurdles finishing fourth in Tampere, Finland in a personal best time of 49.93.

On 30 May 2021 he achieved the 400m hurdles Olympic qualifying standard for the delayed 2020 Tokyo Olympics after he ran a personal best 48.79 seconds to place second at the National Collegiate Athletics Association (NCAA) West Regionals at his home track of Texas A&M University in College Station, Texas. In June, 2021 he advanced to the finals of the 400m hurdles at the 2021 NCAA Outdoor Championships at Hayward Field, Eugene, Oregon, finishing sixth overall. He earned All-America First-Team honors, becoming the first Jamaican to do so since Hickel Woolery in 2009 in the discus.

Ledgister had a disappointing run at the Jamaican Olympic trials where he was the fastest man in the field but did not get past the semi-finals, finishing eighth in his race. Ledgister was subsequently named as a reserve in the Jamaican squad for the Tokyo Olympics, however was unable to compete at the event.
