= National Sports Centre (Isle of Man) =

Multi-sports centre in Douglas, Isle of Man

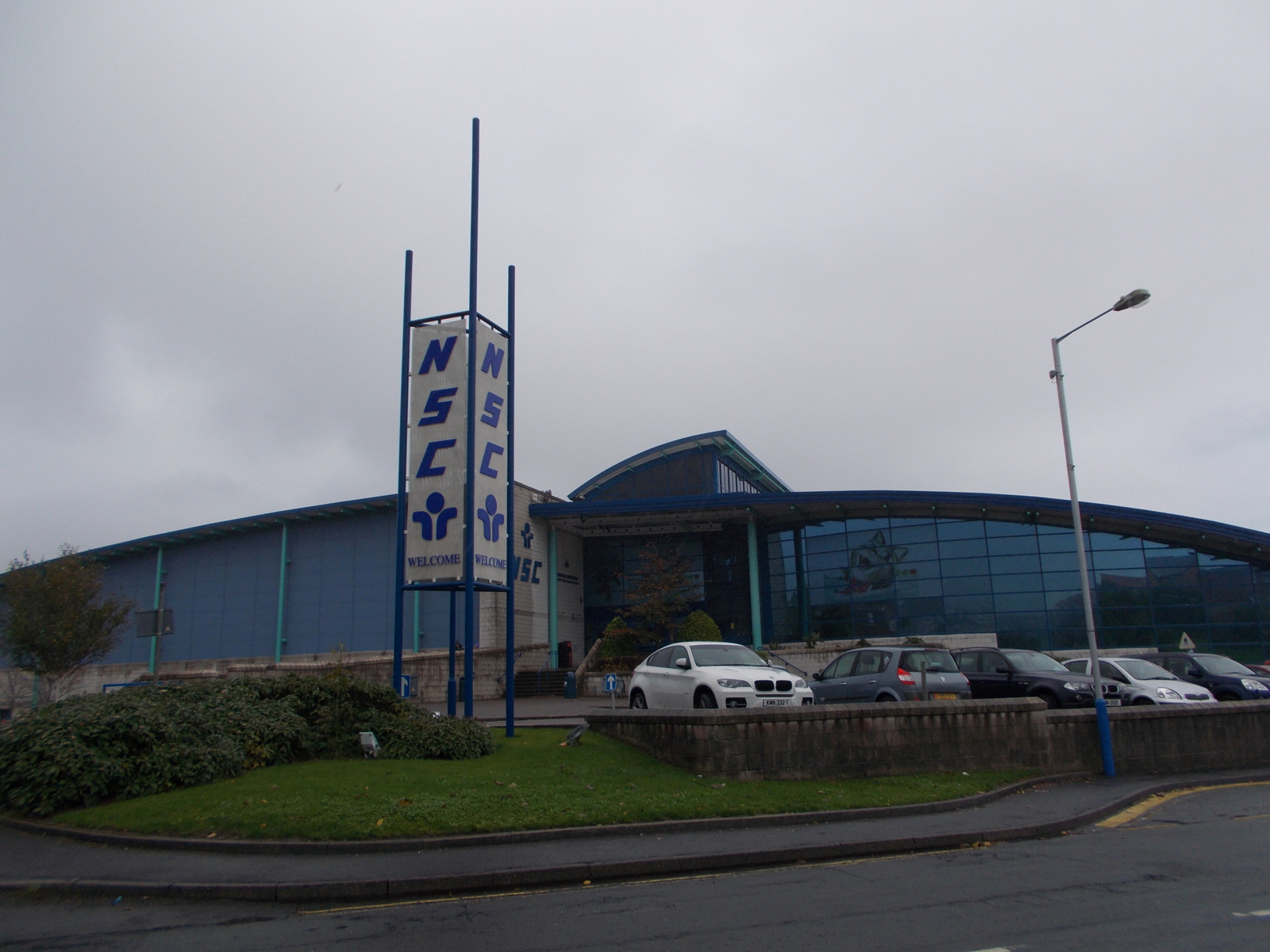
- Aspect from Groves Road
- Interactive map of National Sports Centre
- Location: Groves Road, Douglas, Isle of Man
- Coordinates: 54.152357°N 4.502549°W
- Owner: Department of Education, Sport and Culture of the Isle of Man Government
- Operator: Manx Sport & Recreation
- Capacity: 500 (stadium)
- Surface: Grass

Construction
- Opened: 1991

The National Sports Centre (also known as NSC) in Douglas, Isle of Man is a large multi-sports centre and athletics stadium. The NSC is owned by the Department of Education, Sport and Culture of the Isle of Man Government and operated by the Manx Sport & Recreation.

== History ==
The NSC is built on the site of the former Belle Vue and King George V Park with phase one being opened in 1991. The centre is Quest Accredited (the UK Quality Scheme for Sport and Leisure) and has maintained its highly commended status since it was first awarded in December 2001. The 2001 Island Games was held on the Isle of Man with the NSC being used for some of the sports and the closing ceremony.

In August 2007 the NSC won the runner-up award in the European City of Sport competition after a visit of assessors from the European Capitals of Sport Association.

The centre hosts the annual Manx Youth Games. The opening ceremony is held in the athletics stadium and there are twelve different sports staged throughout the venues in the centre with teams from all over the island. The centre also hosts the annual Manx Gateway Games, with the ninth games being held in July 2008.

In March 2008 the NSC was announced as one of 73 venues earmarked as possible training venues in North West England for the 2012 Summer Olympics, with the NSC listed for Road cycling, Mountain biking, Handball and Shooting.

In 2009 the Isle of Man Institute of Sport moved into a new purpose-built facility at the athletics stadium in the NSC.

=== 2011 Commonwealth Youth Games ===
The NSC was one of the venues for the 2011 Commonwealth Youth Games which was staged on the Isle of Man. The athletics stadium staged the opening ceremony on 8 September 2011 as well as all the athletics events. The swimming pool staged the swimming events and the main sports hall staged badminton with seating for 1,000 spectators.

=== 2018 refurbishment ===
The site suffered damage during a 2015 flood, as well as a fire in March 2018. That August, the swimming pools were closed to enable a nine-month refurbishment to take place. The 4.2 million pound works include replacement of the moveable floor in the competition pool, as well as replacement of the two flumes.

== Facilities ==
=== Outdoor facilities ===
The three outdoor facilities have six group/team changing rooms and two en-suite changing rooms for match officials. For individual competitors there are separate male and female changing areas equipped with lockers, toilets and showers.

The outdoor facilities are -

==== Athletics stadium ====
The athletics stadium has a 400-metre, six lane (eight lane straight) fully floodlit synthetic running track with a 500-seat grandstand.

The track has a current United Kingdom (UK) Athletics Certificate and there is an 11-metre hammer/discus cage.

==== Synthetic pitch ====
Alongside the athletics stadium is a full size (7,000 sq. metres) floodlit all-weather synthetic pitch. The pitch was renewed by AstroTurf in 2002 with a water based playing surface. The pitch is used for various sports including Sunday league football and hockey.

==== Raceway ====
The other outdoor facility is an 800 metres fully lit tarmac raceway, which forms the perimeter of the outdoor provision and has a competition and training facility for Cycling Criterium racing, Racewalking and Road running.

=== Swimming pool and leisure pool ===
The competition pool is a 25-metre state-of-the-art Short course pool with two floating floors and a retractable boom to divide the pool lengthways. The leisure pool has flume rides and a flow pool with a separate shallow pool a children's beach area and a spa pool.

=== Sports halls ===
The NSC has a full-size sports hall with an electronic scoreboard and a PA system and a four-court secondary sports hall. The main hall can be divided into ten badminton courts. The secondary sports hall can be divided into four badminton courts with facilities for cricket and archery practice.

=== Fitness Zone gym and spa suite ===
The Fitness Zone gym and spa suite has a range of cardiovascular fitness and resistance equipment. The health suite has sauna cabins, steam room and a whirlpool spa.

=== Bowls Hall ===
The Bowls Hall has five rinks and a master scoreboard, electronic digital lane scoreboards and a spectator/refreshment area. Portable tiered seating units can be installed to house 100 spectators for special events. The centre is home to the Isle of Man National Sports Centre Indoor Bowls Association.

=== Squash Centre ===
The Squash Centre has six squash courts. Four of the courts have glass backs, three of which are portable and can be moved to create two show courts. These can then accommodate fifty spectators for each court in portable tiered seating units.

=== Bar and cafe ===
The NSC has a bar and café in the main atrium between the pools and dry sports facilities with views of the athletic stadium.
