= Lisa Raye (sprinter) =

Trinidad and Tobago sprinter

Personal information
- Born: 19 January 2008 (age 18)

Sport
- Sport: Athletics
- Event: Sprint

Lisa Raye (born 19 January 2008) is an American-based sprinter who competes for Trinidad and Tobago. In 2025, she set a world under-18 best time over 60 metres.

== Early and personal life ==
Her mother Ava Skeete is from Siparia in the south of Trinidad. With her sister Xenia she was coached by her father Lionel Raye. Their brother Lionel 'LJ” Raye Jr. also competed as a sprinter. Both sisters also played tennis as well as running track. She attended West Warwick High School in West Warwick, Rhode Island. In December 2024, Lisa and Xenia Raye both committed to attend the University of Georgia in the United States.

== Career ==
At the 2024 New Balance Nationals Outdoor in Philadelphia, Raye won both the 100 metres and 200 metres races recording wind-legal times of 11.26 and 22.77 seconds respectively. In July 2024, running for the Providence Cobras, she claimed the 200 metres title in the 15-16 age-group 200 in 23.20 seconds.

In January 2025, she ran a personal best for the 60 metres of 7.24 seconds at the New York International Showcase. Competing over 60 metres at the Millrose Games in February 2025 she set a Girls Under-18 indoor world best and broke the U.S. high school girls 60m national record with 7.13 seconds, surpassing the previous U.S. high school national record of 7.16 set by Shawnti Jackson in 2023. The time set a new Trinidad and Tobago national under-20 record and moved her to joint-second in the senior all-time list with Kelly-Ann Baptiste, behind only Michelle-Lee Ahye.
