= Sophie Papps =

British sprinter

Personal information
- Nationality: British
- Born: 6 October 1994 (age 31)

Sport
- Sport: Track and field
- Event: 60m

Sophie Papps (born 6 October 1994) is a British sprinter. She competed in the 60 metres event at the 2014 IAAF World Indoor Championships.
