= Gerhard de Beer =

South African American football player (born 1994)

No. 67, 72, 71, 70
- Position: Offensive tackle

Personal information
- Born: 5 July 1994 (age 32); Pretoria, South Africa
- Listed height: 6 ft 6 in (1.98 m)
- Listed weight: 312 lb (142 kg)

Career information
- High school: Afrikaanse Hoër Seunskool (Pretoria, South Africa)
- College: Arizona
- NFL draft: 2018: undrafted

Career history
- Buffalo Bills (2018)*; Green Bay Packers (2018–2019)*; Indianapolis Colts (2019)*; Houston Roughnecks (2020)*; Team 9 (2020)*; St. Louis BattleHawks (2020)
- * Offseason or practice squad member only
- Stats at Pro Football Reference

Gerhard de Beer (born 5 July 1994) is a South African former gridiron football player who was an offensive tackle in the National Football League (NFL) and XFL. He played college football at Arizona and was signed by the Buffalo Bills as an undrafted free agent in 2018. He has also played for the Green Bay Packers, Indianapolis Colts, Houston Roughnecks, and St. Louis BattleHawks.

== Early life ==
De Beer was born and raised in South Africa. He played rugby and discus throw in high school at the Afrikaanse Hoër Seunskool. He moved to America to attend the University of Arizona to play American football. He redshirted his first season, but saw playing time for his final three seasons.

De Beer was also an All-American thrower for the Arizona Wildcats track and field team, finishing 4th in the discus throw at the 2016 NCAA Division I Outdoor Track and Field Championships.

== Professional career ==
=== Buffalo Bills ===
After going undrafted in the 2018 NFL draft, de Beer signed with the Buffalo Bills on 11 May 2018. He was waived on 1 September 2018 .

=== Green Bay Packers ===
On 27 November 2018 de Beer was signed to the Green Bay Packers practice squad. On 31 December 2018 he was signed to the active roster. He was waived on 31 August 2019 and became a free agent.

=== Indianapolis Colts ===
On 12 November 2019, de Beer was signed to the Indianapolis Colts practice squad, but was released three days later.

=== Houston Roughnecks ===
In the 2020 XFL draft, de Beer was drafted to the Houston Roughnecks. He was waived during final roster cuts on 22 January 2020.

=== St. Louis BattleHawks ===
De Beer was signed to the XFL's practice squad team, referred to as Team 9, on 30 January 2020. He was signed off of Team 9 by the St. Louis BattleHawks on 9 March 2020. He had his contract terminated when the league suspended operations on 10 April 2020.
