= 2015 Commonwealth Youth Games =

Youth games at the Commonwealth

V Commonwealth Youth Games
- Host city: Apia, Samoa
- Nations: 65
- Athletes: 807
- Events: 170 in 9 sports
- Opening: 5 September 2015
- Closing: 11 September 2015
- Opened by: O le Ao o le Malo Tufuga Efi
- Main venue: Apia Park

The 2015 Commonwealth Youth Games, officially known as the V Commonwealth Youth Games, and commonly known as Samoa 2015, was the fifth Commonwealth Youth Games which started in the year 2000. It was held from 5 to 11 September, 2015 in Apia, the capital of Samoa. Samoa were the only bidders for the Games.

All events took place in the capital city, Apia. The opening and closing ceremonies were held in Apia Park, which also hosted the athletics, rugby and tennis competitions. All other events (boxing, swimming, squash, weightlifting and lawn bowls) were hosted in the Faleata Sports Complex.

About a thousand athletes from 63 nations and territories participated in the nine sports: aquatics, archery, athletics, boxing, lawn bowls, rugby sevens, squash, tennis and weightlifting. Sierra Leone's delegation of seven athletes were prevented from taking part, as the Samoan government refused to grant them visas, citing fears over the spread of ebola. The Commonwealth Games Federation appealed unsuccessfully to Samoan Prime Minister Tuilaepa Aiono Sailele Malielegaoi to reverse that decision, but also rejected Ghana's request that Samoa be subjected to sanctions as a result.

== Sports ==
The 2015 programme featured nine sports, two more than the previous Games and matching that of the 2008 edition. Of the sports on the 2011 programme, badminton, cycling and gymnastics were dropped.

- Aquatics (38)
- Archery (3)
- Athletics (34)
- Boxing (8)
- Lawn bowls (3)
- Rugby sevens (2)
- Squash (5)
- Tennis (5)
- Weightlifting (12)

== Medal table ==
As of September 11, 2015 (information from official website)

Rank	Nation	Gold	Silver	Bronze	Total
1	Australia (AUS)	24	19	19	62
2	South Africa (RSA)	13	7	15	35
3	England (ENG)	12	16	16	44
4	Malaysia (MAS)	11	3	3	17
5	India (IND)	9	4	6	19
6	New Zealand (NZL)	7	9	5	21
7	Nigeria (NGR)	6	2	3	11
8	Northern Ireland (NIR)	4	4	4	12
9	Kenya (KEN)	4	3	0	7
9	Scotland (SCO)	4	3	0	7
11	Jamaica (JAM)	4	1	1	6
12	Samoa (SAM)	2	4	6	12
13	Fiji (FIJ)	2	2	1	5
14	Botswana (BOT)	2	0	1	3
15	Wales (WAL)	1	5	3	9
16	Cameroon (CMR)	1	0	2	3
16	Papua New Guinea (PNG)	1	0	2	3
18	Bangladesh (BAN)	1	0	1	2
19	Barbados (BAR)	1	0	0	1
19	Ghana (GHA)	1	0	0	1
19	Guernsey (GGY)	1	0	0	1
22	Sri Lanka (SRI)	0	4	2	6
23	Uganda (UGA)	0	2	2	4
24	Pakistan (PAK)	0	2	0	2
25	Anguilla (AIA)	0	1	0	1
25	Canada (CAN)	0	1	0	1
25	Cayman Islands (CAY)	0	1	0	1
25	Cook Islands (COK)	0	1	0	1
25	Dominica (DMA)	0	1	0	1
25	Isle of Man (IOM)	0	1	0	1
25	Namibia (NAM)	0	1	0	1
25	Tonga (TGA)	0	1	0	1
33	Mauritius (MRI)	0	0	2	2
33	Norfolk Island (NFK)	0	0	2	2
35	Cyprus (CYP)	0	0	1	1
35	Guyana (GUY)	0	0	1	1
35	Saint Lucia (LCA)	0	0	1	1
35	Seychelles (SEY)	0	0	1	1
35	Solomon Islands (SOL)	0	0	1	1
35	Zambia (ZAM)	0	0	1	1
Totals (40 entries)		111	98	102	311
