= 2019 Malaysia Masters =

Badminton tournament in Kuala Lumpur

Tournament details
- Dates: 15–20 January
- Level: Super 500
- Total prize money: US$350,000
- Venue: Axiata Arena
- Location: Kuala Lumpur, Malaysia

Champions
- Men's singles: (South Korea) Son Wan-ho
- Women's singles: (Thailand) Ratchanok Intanon
- Men's doubles: (Indonesia) Marcus Fernaldi Gideon (Indonesia) Kevin Sanjaya Sukamuljo
- Women's doubles: (Japan) Yuki Fukushima (Japan) Sayaka Hirota
- Mixed doubles: (Japan) Yuta Watanabe (Japan) Arisa Higashino

The 2019 Malaysia Masters (officially known as the Perodua Malaysia Masters 2019 presented by Daihatsu for sponsorship reasons) was a badminton tournament that took place at the Axiata Arena in Malaysia from 15 to 20 January 2019 and had a total purse of $350,000.

== Tournament ==
The 2019 Malaysia Masters was the second tournament of the 2019 BWF World Tour and also part of the Malaysia Masters championships, which had been held since 2009. This tournament was organized by the Badminton Association of Malaysia and sanctioned by the BWF.

=== Venue ===
This international tournament was held at the Axiata Arena in Kuala Lumpur, Malaysia.

=== Point distribution ===
Below is the point distribution table for each phase of the tournament based on the BWF points system for the BWF World Tour Super 500 event.

| Winner | Runner-up | 3/4 | 5/8 | 9/16 | 17/32 | 33/64 | 65/128 |
|---|---|---|---|---|---|---|---|
| 9,200 | 7,800 | 6,420 | 5,040 | 3,600 | 2,220 | 880 | 430 |

=== Prize money ===
The total prize money for this tournament was US$350,000. Distribution of prize money was in accordance with BWF regulations.

| Event | Winner | Finals | Semi-finals | Quarter-finals | Last 16 |
| Singles | $26,250 | $13,300 | $5,075 | $2,100 | $1,225 |
| Doubles | $27,650 | $13,300 | $4,900 | $2,537.50 | $1,312.50 |

== Men's singles ==
=== Seeds ===
1. (Japan) Kento Momota (first round)
2. (China) Shi Yuqi (quarter-finals)
3. (China) Chen Long (final)
4. (South Korea) Son Wan-ho (champion)
5. (Denmark) Viktor Axelsen (semi-finals)
6. (Indonesia) Anthony Sinisuka Ginting (quarter-finals)
7. (India) Srikanth Kidambi (quarter-finals)
8. (Indonesia) Tommy Sugiarto (first round)

=== Finals ===
Semi-finals
5 | (Denmark) Viktor Axelsen | 13 | 18
3 | (China) Chen Long | 21 | 21
4 | (South Korea) Son Wan-ho | w | / | o
(Malaysia) Liew Daren

Final
3 | (China) Chen Long | 17 | 19
4 | (South Korea) Son Wan-ho | 21 | 21

=== Top half ===
==== Section 1 ====
First Round
1 | (Japan) K Momota | 15 | 21 | 20
(Japan) K Nishimoto | 21 | 14 | 22
Q2 | (Malaysia) Lee Z J | 14 | 21 | 21
Q4 | (Thailand) T Saensomboonsuk | 21 | 18 | 10
5 | (Denmark) V Axelsen | 21 | 21
(Japan) K Sakai | 16 | 5
(Denmark) H-K Vittinghus | 21 | 21
(Japan) K Tsuneyama | 13 | 9

Second Round
(Japan) K Nishimoto | 15 | 17
Q2 | (Malaysia) Lee Z J | 21 | 21
5 | (Denmark) V Axelsen | 21 | 21
(Denmark) H-K Vittinghus | 18 | 19

Quarter-finals
Q2 | (Malaysia) Lee Z J | 12 | 20
5 | (Denmark) V Axelsen | 21 | 22

==== Section 2 ====
First Round
3 | (China) Chen L | 21 | 21
PFQ | (Hong Kong) Lee C Y | 12 | 13
(Indonesia) J Christie | 21 | 21
(Denmark) J Ø. Jørgensen | 16 | 15
6 | (Indonesia) A S Ginting | 18 | 21 | 21
(Thailand) K Phetpradab | 21 | 9 | 10
(Denmark) R Gemke | 21 | 19 | 10
Q1 | (India) Parupalli K | 19 | 21 | 21

Second Round
3 | (China) Chen L | 21 | 21
(Indonesia) J Christie | 15 | 18
6 | (Indonesia) A S Ginting | 21 | 25
Q1 | (India) Parupalli K | 17 | 23

Quarter-finals
3 | (China) Chen L | 21 | 22
6 | (Indonesia) A S Ginting | 11 | 20

=== Bottom half ===
==== Section 3 ====
First Round
(Netherlands) M Caljouw | 13 | 18
PFQ | (Hong Kong) Wong W K | 21 | 21
(Hong Kong) Ng K L | 17 | 11
7 | (India) S Kidambi | 21 | 21
(Thailand) K Wangcharoen | 21 | 21
(England) R Ouseph | 19 | 13
(Denmark) A Antonsen | 17 | 9
4 | (South Korea) Son W-h | 21 | 21

Second Round
PFQ | (Hong Kong) Wong W K | 21 | 21 | 18
7 | (India) S Kidambi | 23 | 8 | 21
(Thailand) K Wangcharoen | 21 | 12 | 12
4 | (South Korea) Son W-h | 11 | 21 | 21

Quarter-finals
7 | (India) S Kidambi | 23 | 16 | 17
4 | (South Korea) Son W-h | 21 | 21 | 21

==== Section 4 ====
First Round
Q3 | (Denmark) V Svendsen | 3
(South Korea) Lee H-i | 1^{r}
(Malaysia) Liew D | 23 | 21
8 | (Indonesia) T Sugiarto | 21 | 13
(Thailand) S Avihingsanon | 11 | 21 | 21
(Chinese Taipei) Wang T-w | 21 | 17 | 12
(France) B Leverdez | 9 | 21 | 23
2 | (China) Shi YQ | 21 | 18 | 25

Second Round
Q3 | (Denmark) V Svendsen | 18 | 7
(Malaysia) Liew D | 21 | 21
(Thailand) S Avihingsanon | 8 | 12
2 | (China) Shi YQ | 21 | 21

Quarter-finals
(Malaysia) Liew D | 21 | 16 | 21
2 | (China) Shi YQ | 12 | 21 | 11

== Women's singles ==
=== Seeds ===
1. (Chinese Taipei) Tai Tzu-ying (quarter-finals)
2. (Japan) Nozomi Okuhara (quarter-finals)
3. (Japan) Akane Yamaguchi (first round)
4. (Spain) Carolina Marín (final)
5. (China) He Bingjiao (quarter-finals)
6. (Thailand) Ratchanok Intanon (champion)
7. (India) Saina Nehwal (semi-finals)
8. (South Korea) Sung Ji-hyun (quarter-finals)

=== Finals ===
Semi-finals
6 | (Thailand) Ratchanok Intanon | 21 | 21
(Malaysia) Goh Jin Wei | 16 | 16
4 | (Spain) Carolina Marín | 21 | 21
7 | (India) Saina Nehwal | 16 | 13

Final
6 | (Thailand) Ratchanok Intanon | 21 | 22
4 | (Spain) Carolina Marín | 9 | 20

=== Top half ===
==== Section 1 ====
First Round
1 | (Chinese Taipei) Tai T-y | 21 | 21
(Hong Kong) Cheung N Y | 9 | 11
(Denmark) L Kjærsfeldt | 21 | 21
(Indonesia) L A Mainaky | 9 | 15
6 | (Thailand) R Intanon | 21 | 21
(Indonesia) G M Tunjung | 15 | 16
PFQ | (England) C Birch | 16 | 21 | 21
Q2 | (Switzerland) S Jaquet | 21 | 8 | 16

Second Round
1 | (Chinese Taipei) Tai T-y | 19 | 21 | 21
(Denmark) L Kjærsfeldt | 21 | 12 | 10
6 | (Thailand) R Intanon | 21 | 21
PFQ | (England) C Birch | 12 | 10

Quarter-finals
1 | (Chinese Taipei) Tai T-y | 13 | 14
6 | (Thailand) R Intanon | 21 | 21

==== Section 2 ====
First Round
3 | (Japan) A Yamaguchi | 14 | 12
(Malaysia) Goh J W | 21 | 21
(China) Zhang YM | 21 | 13 | 21
Q3 | (Singapore) Yeo J M | 18 | 21 | 16
5 | (China) He BJ | 21 | 21
(Thailand) B Ongbamrungphan | 15 | 15
(Indonesia) Fitriani | 21 | 21
Q1 | (Indonesia) Y Y Susanto | 16 | 18

Second Round
(Malaysia) Goh J W | 21 | 21
(China) Zhang YM | 13 | 10
5 | (China) He BJ | 21 | 21
(Indonesia) Fitriani | 14 | 11

Quarter-finals
(Malaysia) Goh J W | 21 | 21
5 | (China) He BJ | 15 | 16

=== Bottom half ===
==== Section 3 ====
First Round
(Malaysia) Lee Y Y | 11 | 21 | 17
(Russia) E Kosetskaya | 21 | 15 | 21
(Canada) M Li | 19 | 19
8 | (South Korea) Sung J-h | 21 | 21
(Malaysia) S Cheah S Y | 21 | 5 | 13
(China) Gao FJ | 19 | 21 | 21
(Thailand) N Jindapol | 19 | 23
4 | (Spain) C Marín | 21 | 25

Second Round
(Russia) E Kosetskaya | 17 | 17
8 | (South Korea) Sung J-h | 21 | 21
(China) Gao FJ | 16 | 8^{r}
4 | (Spain) C Marín | 21 | 6

Quarter-finals
8 | (South Korea) Sung J-h | 13 | 13
4 | (Spain) C Marín | 21 | 21

==== Section 4 ====
First Round
Q4 | (Indonesia) R Hartawan | 21 | 18 | 17
(Hong Kong) Yip P Y | 19 | 21 | 21
(Hong Kong) Deng X | 21 | 18 | 18
7 | (India) S Nehwal | 14 | 21 | 21
(Japan) A Ohori | 21 | 21
(South Korea) Kim G-e | 16 | 19
(Japan) S Takahashi | 15 | 13
2 | (Japan) N Okuhara | 21 | 21

Second Round
(Hong Kong) Yip P Y | 14 | 16
7 | (India) S Nehwal | 21 | 21
(Japan) A Ohori | 21 | 11 | 14
2 | (Japan) N Okuhara | 14 | 21 | 21

Quarter-finals
7 | (India) S Nehwal | 21 | 23
2 | (Japan) N Okuhara | 18 | 21

== Men's doubles ==
=== Seeds ===
1. (Indonesia) Marcus Fernaldi Gideon / Kevin Sanjaya Sukamuljo (champions)
2. (Japan) Takeshi Kamura / Keigo Sonoda (quarter-finals)
3. (Japan) Hiroyuki Endo / Yuta Watanabe (quarter-finals)
4. (Denmark) Kim Astrup / Anders Skaarup Rasmussen (quarter-finals)
5. (Indonesia) Fajar Alfian / Muhammad Rian Ardianto (second round)
6. (Indonesia) Mohammad Ahsan / Hendra Setiawan (second round)
7. (Japan) Takuto Inoue / Yuki Kaneko (quarter-finals)
8. (Chinese Taipei) Liao Min-chun / Su Ching-heng (first round)

=== Finals ===
Semi-finals
1 | (Indonesia) Marcus Fernaldi Gideon (Indonesia) Kevin Sanjaya Sukamuljo | 21 | 24
(Malaysia) Goh V Shem (Malaysia) Tan Wee Kiong | 18 | 22
(Malaysia) Aaron Chia (Malaysia) Soh Wooi Yik | 6 | 21 | 19
(Malaysia) Ong Yew Sin (Malaysia) Teo Ee Yi | 21 | 18 | 21

Final
1 | (Indonesia) Marcus Fernaldi Gideon (Indonesia) Kevin Sanjaya Sukamuljo | 21 | 21
(Malaysia) Ong Yew Sin (Malaysia) Teo Ee Yi | 15 | 16

=== Top half ===
==== Section 1 ====
First Round
1 | (Indonesia) M F Gideon (Indonesia) K S Sukamuljo | 21 | 21
Q3 | (Indonesia) S K Gutama (Indonesia) F W Putra | 16 | 17
PFQ | (South Korea) Kang M-h (South Korea) Kim W-h | 22 | 11 | 14
PFQ | (Thailand) K Kedren (Thailand) D Puavaranukroh | 20 | 21 | 21
7 | (Japan) T Inoue (Japan) Y Kaneko | 21 | 21
(Denmark) M P Kolding (Denmark) N Nøhr | 19 | 16
(Russia) V Ivanov (Russia) I Sozonov | 23 | 21 | 19
(Indonesia) W Nayaka (Indonesia) A Yusuf | 25 | 19 | 21

Second Round
1 | (Indonesia) M F Gideon (Indonesia) K S Sukamuljo | 21 | 3
PFQ | (Thailand) K Kedren (Thailand) D Puavaranukroh | 16 | 3^{r}
7 | (Japan) T Inoue (Japan) Y Kaneko | 19 | 30 | 21
(Indonesia) W Nayaka (Indonesia) A Yusuf | 21 | 29 | 18

Quarter-finals
1 | (Indonesia) M F Gideon (Indonesia) K S Sukamuljo | 21 | 23 | 21
7 | (Japan) T Inoue (Japan) Y Kaneko | 13 | 25 | 14

==== Section 2 ====
First Round
3 | (Japan) H Endo (Japan) Y Watanabe | 21 | 21
(South Korea) Choi S-g (South Korea) Seo S-j | 18 | 17
(Indonesia) B Angriawan (Indonesia) Hardianto | 21 | 21
(Netherlands) J Maas (Netherlands) R Tabeling | 16 | 15
6 | (Indonesia) M Ahsan (Indonesia) H Setiawan | 21 | 21
(South Korea) Kim G-j (South Korea) Lee Y-d | 16 | 13
(Malaysia) Goh V S (Malaysia) Tan W K | 21 | 19 | 21
Q4 | (China) Di ZJ (China) Wang C | 14 | 21 | 9

Second Round
3 | (Japan) H Endo (Japan) Y Watanabe | 27 | 21
(Indonesia) B Angriawan (Indonesia) Hardianto | 25 | 12
6 | (Indonesia) M Ahsan (Indonesia) H Setiawan | 19 | 22
(Malaysia) Goh V S (Malaysia) Tan W K | 21 | 24

Quarter-finals
3 | (Japan) H Endo (Japan) Y Watanabe | 20 | 15
(Malaysia) Goh V S (Malaysia) Tan W K | 22 | 21

=== Bottom half ===
==== Section 3 ====
First Round
(England) M Ellis (England) C Langridge | 19 | 12
(Malaysia) A Chia (Malaysia) Soh W Y | 21 | 21
PFQ | (China) Huang KX (China) Wang ZK | 17 | 13
5 | (Indonesia) F Alfian (Indonesia) M R Ardianto | 21 | 21
(Germany) M Lamsfuß (Germany) M E Seidel | 13 | 22 | 19
Q1 | (Malaysia) Chooi K M (Malaysia) Low J S | 21 | 20 | 21
Q2 | (England) B Lane (England) S Vendy | 19 | 10
4 | (Denmark) K Astrup (Denmark) A S Rasmussen | 21 | 21

Second Round
(Malaysia) A Chia (Malaysia) Soh W Y | 26 | 21
5 | (Indonesia) F Alfian (Indonesia) M R Ardianto | 24 | 15
Q1 | (Malaysia) Chooi K M (Malaysia) Low J S | 13 | 14
4 | (Denmark) K Astrup (Denmark) A S Rasmussen | 21 | 21

Quarter-finals
(Malaysia) A Chia (Malaysia) Soh W Y | 21 | 21
4 | (Denmark) K Astrup (Denmark) A S Rasmussen | 17 | 19

==== Section 4 ====
First Round
(Malaysia) M Arif A L (Malaysia) N M Azriyn A | 18 | 18
PFQ | (Denmark) D Daugaard (Denmark) F Søgaard | 21 | 21
(Malaysia) Ong Y S (Malaysia) Teo E Y | 21 | 21
8 | (Chinese Taipei) Liao M-c (Chinese Taipei) Su C-h | 14 | 14
(Japan) T Hoki (Japan) Y Kobayashi | 21 | 21
(Denmark) M Boe (Denmark) C Mogensen | 15 | 14
(Chinese Taipei) Lu C-y (Chinese Taipei) Yang P-h | 14 | 18
2 | (Japan) T Kamura (Japan) K Sonoda | 21 | 21

Second Round
PFQ | (Denmark) D Daugaard (Denmark) F Søgaard | 13 | 21 | 10
(Malaysia) Ong Y S (Malaysia) Teo E Y | 21 | 14 | 21
(Japan) T Hoki (Japan) Y Kobayashi | 17 | 19
2 | (Japan) T Kamura (Japan) K Sonoda | 21 | 21

Quarter-finals
(Malaysia) Ong Y S (Malaysia) Teo E Y | 21 | 21
2 | (Japan) T Kamura (Japan) K Sonoda | 19 | 16

== Women's doubles ==
=== Seeds ===
1. (Japan) Yuki Fukushima / Sayaka Hirota (champions)
2. (Japan) Misaki Matsutomo / Ayaka Takahashi (semi-finals)
3. (Japan) Mayu Matsumoto / Wakana Nagahara (semi-finals)
4. (Indonesia) Greysia Polii / Apriyani Rahayu (final)
5. (South Korea) Lee So-hee / Shin Seung-chan (withdrew)
6. (Japan) Shiho Tanaka / Koharu Yonemoto (first round)
7. (Thailand) Jongkolphan Kititharakul / Rawinda Prajongjai (first round)
8. (Bulgaria) Gabriela Stoeva / Stefani Stoeva (second round)

=== Finals ===
Semi-finals
1 | (Japan) Yuki Fukushima (Japan) Sayaka Hirota | 21 | 21
3 | (Japan) Mayu Matsumoto (Japan) Wakana Nagahara | 13 | 14
4 | (Indonesia) Greysia Polii (Indonesia) Apriyani Rahayu | 20 | 21 | 21
2 | (Japan) Misaki Matsutomo (Japan) Ayaka Takahashi | 22 | 13 | 19

Final
1 | (Japan) Yuki Fukushima (Japan) Sayaka Hirota | 18 | 21 | 21
4 | (Indonesia) Greysia Polii (Indonesia) Apriyani Rahayu | 21 | 16 | 16

=== Top half ===
==== Section 1 ====
First Round
1 | (Japan) Y Fukushima (Japan) S Hirota | 21 | 21
(Russia) E Bolotova (Russia) A Davletova | 7 | 11
(South Korea) Kim S-y (South Korea) Kong H-y | 21 | 21
(China) Dong WJ (China) Feng XY | 14 | 16
8 | (Bulgaria) G Stoeva (Bulgaria) S Stoeva | 21 | 21
(Australia) S Mapasa (Australia) G Somerville | 15 | 18
Q3 | (China) Liu XX (China) Xia YT | 19 | 16
(South Korea) Chang Y-n (South Korea) Jung K-e | 21 | 21

Second Round
1 | (Japan) Y Fukushima (Japan) S Hirota | 21 | 21
(South Korea) Kim S-y (South Korea) Kong H-y | 17 | 19
8 | (Bulgaria) G Stoeva (Bulgaria) S Stoeva | 12 | 6
(South Korea) Chang Y-n (South Korea) Jung K-e | 21 | 21

Quarter-finals
1 | (Japan) Y Fukushima (Japan) S Hirota | 21 | 17 | 21
(South Korea) Chang Y-n (South Korea) Jung K-e | 11 | 21 | 19

==== Section 2 ====
First Round
3 | (Japan) M Matsumoto (Japan) W Nagahara | 21 | 21
(England) C Birch (England) L Smith | 17 | 17
(France) D Delrue (France) L Palermo | 21 | 19 | 21
(France) É Lefel (France) A Tran | 13 | 21 | 18
7 | (Thailand) J Kititharakul (Thailand) R Prajongjai | 21 | 19 | 25
(Indonesia) D D Haris (Indonesia) V Putri | 17 | 21 | 27
(Japan) A Sakuramoto (Japan) Y Takahata | 21 | 21
(Malaysia) Chow M K (Malaysia) Lee M Y | 8 | 14

Second Round
3 | (Japan) M Matsumoto (Japan) W Nagahara | 21 | 21
(France) D Delrue (France) L Palermo | 14 | 17
(Indonesia) D D Haris (Indonesia) V Putri | 11 | 13
(Japan) A Sakuramoto (Japan) Y Takahata | 21 | 21

Quarter-finals
3 | (Japan) M Matsumoto (Japan) W Nagahara | 21 | 21
(Japan) A Sakuramoto (Japan) Y Takahata | 12 | 13

=== Bottom half ===
==== Section 3 ====
First Round
Q4 | (Indonesia) Y Barkah (Indonesia) J F Sugiarto | 14 | 21 | 21
Q2 | (Germany) L Efler (Germany) I Herttrich | 21 | 9 | 17
(Thailand) C Chaladchalam (Thailand) P Muenwong | 21 | 12 | 18
PFQ | (Malaysia) V Hoo K M (Malaysia) Yap C W | 12 | 21 | 21
(Indonesia) A Imanuela (Indonesia) S F Ramadhanti | 13 | 9
PFQ | (Thailand) P Supajirakul (Thailand) S Taerattanachai | 21 | 21
PFQ | (Hong Kong) Ng W Y (Hong Kong) Yeung N T | 21 | 8 | 17
4 | (Indonesia) G Polii (Indonesia) A Rahayu | 17 | 21 | 21

Second Round
Q4 | (Indonesia) Y Barkah (Indonesia) J F Sugiarto | 21 | 21
PFQ | (Malaysia) V Hoo K M (Malaysia) Yap C W | 9 | 18
PFQ | (Thailand) P Supajirakul (Thailand) S Taerattanachai | 14 | 15
4 | (Indonesia) G Polii (Indonesia) A Rahayu | 21 | 21

Quarter-finals
Q4 | (Indonesia) Y Barkah (Indonesia) J F Sugiarto | 21 | 12 | 14
4 | (Indonesia) G Polii (Indonesia) A Rahayu | 19 | 21 | 21

==== Section 4 ====
First Round
(Hong Kong) Ng T Y (Hong Kong) Yuen S Y | 16 | 20
(India) A Ponnappa (India) N. S Reddy | 21 | 22
(Indonesia) N K M Istirani (Indonesia) R A Pradipta | 21 | 19 | 21
6 | (Japan) S Tanaka (Japan) K Yonemoto | 13 | 21 | 11
(Germany) J Goliszewski (Germany) L Käpplein | 11 | 20
(Netherlands) S Piek (Netherlands) C Seinen | 21 | 22
Q1 | (Malaysia) A Cheong C Y (Malaysia) Lim C S | 10 | 9
2 | (Japan) M Matsutomo (Japan) A Takahashi | 21 | 21

Second Round
(India) A Ponnappa (India) N. S Reddy | 18 | 17
(Indonesia) N K M Istirani (Indonesia) R A Pradipta | 21 | 21
(Netherlands) S Piek (Netherlands) C Seinen | 19 | 8
2 | (Japan) M Matsutomo (Japan) A Takahashi | 21 | 21

Quarter-finals
(Indonesia) N K M Istirani (Indonesia) R A Pradipta | 24 | 8
2 | (Japan) M Matsutomo (Japan) A Takahashi | 26 | 21

== Mixed doubles ==
=== Seeds ===
1. (Japan) Yuta Watanabe / Arisa Higashino (champions)
2. (Thailand) Dechapol Puavaranukroh / Sapsiree Taerattanachai (final)
3. (Malaysia) Chan Peng Soon / Goh Liu Ying (semi-finals)
4. (England) Chris Adcock / Gabby Adcock (quarter-finals)
5. (Malaysia) Goh Soon Huat / Shevon Jemie Lai (quarter-finals)
6. (South Korea) Seo Seung-jae / Chae Yoo-jung (quarter-finals)
7. (Indonesia) Hafiz Faizal / Gloria Emanuelle Widjaja (second round)
8. (England) Marcus Ellis / Lauren Smith (first round)

=== Finals ===
Semi-finals
1 | (Japan) Yuta Watanabe (Japan) Arisa Higashino | 21 | 7 | 21
3 | (Malaysia) Chan Peng Soon (Malaysia) Goh Liu Ying | 15 | 21 | 14
Q4 | (Netherlands) Robin Tabeling (Netherlands) Selena Piek | 19 | 14
2 | (Thailand) Dechapol Puavaranukroh (Thailand) Sapsiree Taerattanachai | 21 | 21

Final
1 | (Japan) Yuta Watanabe (Japan) Arisa Higashino | 21 | 21
2 | (Thailand) Dechapol Puavaranukroh (Thailand) Sapsiree Taerattanachai | 18 | 18

=== Top half ===
==== Section 1 ====
First Round
1 | (Japan) Y Watanabe (Japan) A Higashino | 21 | 15 | 21
PFQ | (Republic of Ireland) S Magee (Republic of Ireland) C Magee | 15 | 21 | 17
(England) B Lane (England) J Pugh | 21 | 13 | 21
PFQ | (Japan) K Gondo (Japan) A Kurihara | 17 | 21 | 15
6 | (South Korea) Seo S-j (South Korea) Chae Y-j | 21 | 16 | 21
(Germany) M E Seidel (Germany) L Efler | 18 | 21 | 13
(Malaysia) Chen T J (Malaysia) Peck Y W | 18 | 12
PFQ | (Japan) Y Kaneko (Japan) M Matsutomo | 21 | 21

Second Round
1 | (Japan) Y Watanabe (Japan) A Higashino | 21 | 21
(England) B Lane (England) J Pugh | 9 | 14
6 | (South Korea) Seo S-j (South Korea) Chae Y-j | 21 | 17 | 21
PFQ | (Japan) Y Kaneko (Japan) M Matsutomo | 12 | 21 | 12

Quarter-finals
1 | (Japan) Y Watanabe (Japan) A Higashino | 21 | 21
6 | (South Korea) Seo S-j (South Korea) Chae Y-j | 7 | 13

==== Section 2 ====
First Round
3 | (Malaysia) Chan P S (Malaysia) Goh L Y | 21 | 21
Q3 | (France) T Gicquel (France) D Delrue | 13 | 14
(China) Lu K (China) Chen L | 21 | 21
(France) R Labar (France) A Mittelheisser | 11 | 15
5 | (Malaysia) Goh S H (Malaysia) S J Lai | 23 | 21
(Hong Kong) Chang T C (Hong Kong) Ng W Y | 21 | 14
(Indonesia) R Rivaldy (Indonesia) P H Mentari | 9 | 21 | 17
(Japan) T Hoki (Japan) W Nagahara | 21 | 19 | 21

Second Round
3 | (Malaysia) Chan P S (Malaysia) Goh L Y | 17 | 21 | 21
(China) Lu K (China) Chen L | 21 | 17 | 15
5 | (Malaysia) Goh S H (Malaysia) S J Lai | 21 | 21
(Japan) T Hoki (Japan) W Nagahara | 13 | 19

Quarter-finals
3 | (Malaysia) Chan P S (Malaysia) Goh L Y | 22 | 22
5 | (Malaysia) Goh S H (Malaysia) S J Lai | 20 | 20

=== Bottom half ===
==== Section 3 ====
First Round
Q4 | (Netherlands) R Tabeling (Netherlands) S Piek | 21 | 21
(India) P Chopra (India) N. S Reddy | 19 | 17
(Indonesia) T Ahmad (Indonesia) D Susanto | 21 | 21
8 | (England) M Ellis (England) L Smith | 16 | 17
(Thailand) N Phuangphuapet (Thailand) S Amitrapai | 21 | 21
(Russia) E Dremin (Russia) E Dimova | 16 | 14
(Malaysia) Tan K M (Malaysia) Lai P J | 22 | 11 | 15
4 | (England) C Adcock (England) G Adcock | 20 | 21 | 21

Second Round
Q4 | (Netherlands) R Tabeling (Netherlands) S Piek | 21 | 21
(Indonesia) T Ahmad (Indonesia) D Susanto | 10 | 12
(Thailand) N Phuangphuapet (Thailand) S Amitrapai | 14 | 12
4 | (England) C Adcock (England) G Adcock | 21 | 21

Quarter-finals
Q4 | (Netherlands) R Tabeling (Netherlands) S Piek | 21 | 21
4 | (England) C Adcock (England) G Adcock | 18 | 18

==== Section 4 ====
First Round
Q1 | (China) Ren XY (China) Zhou CM | 13 | 19
(Indonesia) P Jordan (Indonesia) M D Oktavianti | 21 | 21
Q2 | (Chinese Taipei) Lu C-y (Chinese Taipei) Lee C-h | 10 | 18
7 | (Indonesia) H Faizal (Indonesia) G E Widjaja | 21 | 21
(Indonesia) R Alexander (Indonesia) A Saufika | 21 | 17 | 22
(Germany) M Lamsfuß (Germany) I Herttrich | 19 | 21 | 24
PFQ | (Indonesia) A E Prasetya (Indonesia) M G Islami | 19 | 12
2 | (Thailand) D Puavaranukroh (Thailand) S Taerattanachai | 21 | 21

Second Round
(Indonesia) P Jordan (Indonesia) M D Oktavianti | 21 | 24
7 | (Indonesia) H Faizal (Indonesia) G E Widjaja | 14 | 22
(Germany) M Lamsfuß (Germany) I Herttrich | 9 | 21 | 15
2 | (Thailand) D Puavaranukroh (Thailand) S Taerattanachai | 21 | 19 | 21

Quarter-finals
(Indonesia) P Jordan (Indonesia) M D Oktavianti | 21 | 14 | 18
2 | (Thailand) D Puavaranukroh (Thailand) S Taerattanachai | 18 | 21 | 21

| Preceded by 2019 Thailand Masters | BWF World Tour; 2019 BWF season | Succeeded by 2019 Indonesia Masters |
