= Niek van Dijk =

Dutch orthopedic surgeon (born 1951)

C. Niek van Dijk
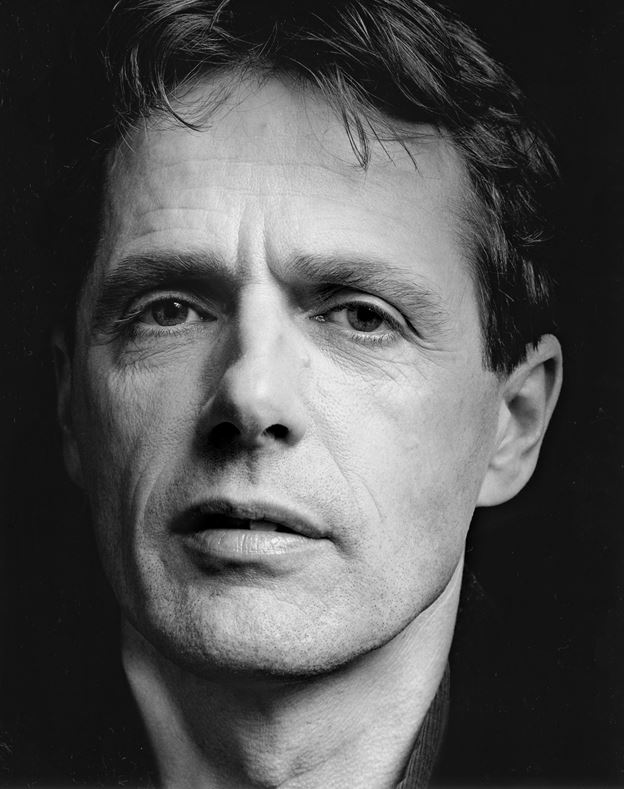
- Born: 20 May 1951 (age 75); Amsterdam, Netherlands
- Occupation: Orthopaedic surgeon
- Employer(s): Academic Medical Center, Amsterdam
- Website: http://www.ankleplatform.com

Cornelis Nicolaas "Niek" van Dijk is an orthopaedic surgeon, a specialist in sports traumatology and arthroscopic surgery of the ankle and knee. Until 2016 Van Dijk was Full Professor in Orthopaedics and head of the Orthopaedic Department at the AMC-hospital in Amsterdam (Amsterdam University Medical Centers, University of Amsterdam). He continues his career in the FIFA Medical Centres of excellence in Madrid and Porto. He is the founder of a characteristic approach, which has come to be known as the Amsterdam Foot & Ankle School (aka The Amsterdam Approach):

Niek van Dijk has won renown as a leading authority for arthroscopic surgery of the ankle and the knee. In particular, he is known for his Amsterdam Ankle School (the Amsterdam Approach), which places particular emphasis upon a painstaking diagnosis, followed by arthroscopy as a surgical resource rather than a mere diagnostic. His operative techniques have spread throughout the world, and have benefitted leading athletes, as well as ordinary people suffering from ankle problems.

== Education ==
Niek van Dijk was born in Amsterdam, on 20 May 1951. He received his MD in 1977 from the University of Leiden. He began his residency at Utrecht's Centraal Military Hospital, and continued at Wilhelmina Gasthuis Department of Experimental Surgery, in Amsterdam. Between 1979 and 1985 he was trained by Professor Dr. R.K. Marti in Orthopaedic Surgery at the Amsterdam Academic Medical Center (AMC), where he commenced his career as an orthopaedic surgeon. In March 1994, he obtained his Ph.D. from the University of Amsterdam. His thesis was entitled “Diagnostic strategies in patients with severe ankle sprain”, and his promoter was Professor Dr. R.K. Marti, the former head of Orthopaedic Surgery at AMC.

== Appointments ==
- 1985 Orthopaedic consultant, National Ballet, Amsterdam.
- 2000-2001 President Dutch Orthopaedic Association
- 2001 Professor Arthroscopic Surgery at the University of Amsterdam
- 2002-2016 Head of the Orthopaedic Department at Academic Medical Center and Full Professor at the University of Amsterdam
- 2003-2005 President Dutch Orthopaedic Association
- 2008-2010 President Nordic Orthopaedic Federation
- 2008 President European Ankle and Foot Association
- 2010 Affiliate Professor, University of Minho, Portugal
- 2010-2012 President European Society of Sports Traumatology, Knee Surgery and Arthroscopy
- 2014 Affiliate Professor, University of Porto, Portugal
- 2014 Congress president biannual ESSKA Congress Amsterdam

== Honorary memberships and awards ==
- 2005 Honorary member of the Greek Arthroscopy Association (HAA) Thessaloniki, Greece.
- 2005 Cappagh Trust Lecture: ”Lateral Ankle Ligament Lesions”;Visiting Professor, Cappagh National Orthopaedic Hospital, Dublin, Ireland.
- 2007 Honorary member Czech Society for Sports Traumatology and Arthroscopy (SSTA)
- 2007 Rose Honorary Lecture: “Treatment of OCD”; Visiting Professor, Hospital of Special Surgery (HSS), New York, USA.
- 2010 Grand Round Lecture “Osteochondral Talar Defects: Current Concepts”; Visiting Professor Harvard University, Boston, USA.
- 2011 Honorary member of the ASTAOR (The Association of Sports Traumatology, Arthroscopy, Orthopaedic surgery and Rehabilitation), Russia
- 2011 Honorary member of GRECMIP (Groupe de la Chirurgie Mini-Invasive et de la Cheville) France.
- 2013 Honorary member Slovak Society of Arthroscopy and Sport Traumatology (SSAST)
- 2014 ESSKAR-award for the most valuable section/ committee of ESSKA (as president of ESSKA-AFAS)
- 2014 Honorary Lecture “Osteochondral defects in the ankle: the rationale for diagnosis and treatment”, 29th GOTS (Association of Orthopaedic and Traumatologic Sports Medicine) Annual Congress, Munich, Germany
- 2014 Presidential lecture “Actual dilemmas and future in orthopaedics”, XIII International Congress of the Argentine Arthroscopy Association (AAA), Buenos Aires, Argentina
- 2014 Honorary member of the Argentine Arthroscopy Association (AAA)
- 2015 Honorary member of Sociedade Portuguesa de Artroscopia e Traumatologia Desportiva (SPAT)

== Editorial roles ==
Member of several editorial boards:

- KSSTA journal
- Acta Orthopaedica et Traumatologica Turcica (AOTT)
- Journal of Experimental Orthopaedics (JEO)
- Journal of Orthopaedics Trauma and Rehabilitation (Hong Kong)
- AP-SMART (Asia Pacific Journal of Sports Medicine, Arthroscopy, Rehabilitation and Technology)

Corresponding member of:

- Deutschprachige Arbeitsgemeinschaft für Arthroskopie (AGA)
- Colombian and Chilean Society of Orthopaedic Surgery and Traumatology.

Editor-in-Chief of:

- Journal of ISAKOS (JISAKOS)

== Founding member roles ==
- International Achilles Tendon Study Group, which has published four books on Achilles tendon problems.
- Ankle and Foot Associates, a Section of the European Society of Sports Traumatology, Knee Surgery & Arthroscopy (ESSKA-AFAS)

== Publications ==
Niek van Dijk has written or co-edited 11 books, published more than 280 indexed SCI-publications. He has written more than 100 book chapters and presents on average 25 international invited lectures a year.

Author:

- Ankle Arthroscopy. Techniques developed by the Amsterdam Foot and Ankle School, Author: C. Niek van Dijk, Springer Heidelberg New York London, 2014, with anatomical illustrations by Pau Golanó.
- Inaugural address : “Beweegredenen. De patient als bron van inspiratie”, C. Niek van Dijk, Vossiuspers UvA, Amsterdam, the Netherlands, 2002.
- Thesis: “On Diagnostic Strategies in Patients with Severe Ankle Sprain”, author: C. Niek van Dijk, Rodopi, Amsterdam, 1994.

Co-editor:

- Current Concepts in Achilles tendon disorders. A comprehensive overview of diagnosis and treatment. Editors: Jon Karlsson, James Calder, C. Niek van Dijk, Nicola Maffulli, Hajo Thermann, DJO publications Guildford UK, 2014.
- Talar Osteochondral defects, Editors: C. Niek van Dijk, John G. Kennedy, Springer Heidelberg New York Dordrecht London, 2014.
- ESSKA Instructional Course Lecture Book, Amsterdam 2014, Editors: S. Zaffagnini, R. Becker, G.M.M.J. Kerkhoffs, J. Espregueira Mendes, C.N. van Dijk, Springer Heidelberg New York Dordrecht London, 2014.
- ESSKA Instructional Course Lecture Book, Geneva 2012, Editors: J. Menetrey, S. Zaffagnini, D. Fritschy, C.N. van Dijk, Springer Heidelberg New York Dordrecht London, 2012.
- Disorders of the Achilles Tendon Insertion. Current Concepts, Editors: James Calder, Jón Karlsson, Nicola Maffulli, Hajo Thermann, C. Niek van Dijk, DJO Publications Guildford UK, 2012.
- Current Concepts in Achilles Tendinopathy, Editors: James D. Calder, Jón Karlsson, Nicola Maffulli, Hajo Thermann, C. Niek van Dijk DJO Publications Guildford UK, 2010.
- Current Concepts in Achilles Tendon Rupture, Editors: C. Niek van Dijk, Jon Karlsson, Nicola Maffulli, Hayo Thermann, DJO Publications, Guildford, UK, 2008.
- Foot and Ankle Clinics “Arthroscopy of the Foot and Ankle”, Guest editor: C. Niek van Dijk, consulting editor Mark S. Myerson, Elsevier Saunders, Philadelphia, June 2006, volume 11, number 2.

== Famous patients (selection) ==
- Keylor Navas, Goalkeeper at Real Madrid and Costa Rica national team.
- Cristiano Ronaldo, Soccer player Manchester United and Real Madrid, World Soccer player of the year 2008, 2013.
- Képler Laveran Lima Ferreira (Pepe), Soccer player Real Madrid. Portugal National team
- Juan Carlos Navarro, Basketball player FC Barcelona, All-Europa player of the year (2009, 2010, 2011)
- Robin van Persie, Football player Arsenal, Manchester United, Fenerbahçe and Netherlands National team
- Riccardo Montolivo, Football player AC Milan
- El Shaarawy, Football player AC Milan
- Marco van Basten, Ajax & AC Milan
- Marcus Fernaldi Gideon, Indonesian badminton player, former world number 1.
