= 2017 All England Super Series Premier =

Badminton championships

Tournament details
- Dates: 7–12 March
- Edition: 107th
- Level: Super Series Premier
- Total prize money: US$600,000
- Venue: Barclaycard Arena
- Location: Birmingham, England

Champions
- Men's singles: (Malaysia) Lee Chong Wei
- Women's singles: (Chinese Taipei) Tai Tzu-ying
- Men's doubles: (Indonesia) Marcus Fernaldi Gideon (Indonesia) Kevin Sanjaya Sukamuljo
- Women's doubles: (South Korea) Chang Ye-na (South Korea) Lee So-hee
- Mixed doubles: (China) Lu Kai (China) Huang Yaqiong

The 2017 All England Super Series Premier was the first Super Series tournament of the 2017 BWF Super Series. The tournament took place in Birmingham, England, from 7 to 12 March 2017 and had a total purse of $600,000.

== Men's singles ==
=== Seeds ===
1. (Malaysia) Lee Chong Wei (champion)
2. (Denmark) Jan Ø. Jørgensen (second round)
3. (Denmark) Viktor Axelsen (quarterfinals)
4. (South Korea) Son Wan-ho (first round)
5. (China) Chen Long (second round)
6. (China) Lin Dan (semifinals)
7. (China) Tian Houwei (quarterfinals)
8. (Hong Kong) Ng Ka Long (second round)

=== Top half ===
First Round
1	(Malaysia) Lee C W	21	21
Q4	(France) B Leverdez	15	12
(Chinese Taipei) Wang T-w	17	21	21
(Hong Kong) Wei N	21	19	14
7	(China) Tian HW	21	21
(Indonesia) T Sugiarto	19	18
(China) Qiao B	21	20	19
(India) H.S. Prannoy	17	22	21
4	(South Korea) Son W-h	1^{r}
(Indonesia) S D Kuncoro	4
(Chinese Taipei) Chou T-c	21	21
Q2	(Indonesia) A S Ginting	10	14
5	(China) Chen L	21	21
(Germany) M Zwiebler	17	7
(Denmark) H-K Vittinghus	15	18
(Thailand) T Saensomboonsuk	21	21

Second Round
1	(Malaysia) Lee C W	21	21
(Chinese Taipei) Wang T-w	18	18
7	(China) Tian HW	21	21
(India) H.S. Prannoy	13	5
(Indonesia) S D Kuncoro	13	11
(Chinese Taipei) Chou T-c	21	21
5	(China) Chen L	16	19
(Thailand) T Saensomboonsuk	21	21

Quarterfinals
1	(Malaysia) Lee C W	21	21
7	(China) Tian HW	12	15
(Chinese Taipei) Chou T-c	21	16	21
(Thailand) T Saensomboonsuk	19	21	8

Semifinals
1	(Malaysia) Lee C W	10	21	21
(Chinese Taipei) Chou T-c	21	14	9

=== Bottom half ===
First Round
(India) A Jayaram	19	13
(China) Huang YX	21	21
(Malaysia) Z Zulkiffli	11	12
6	(China) Lin D	21	21
(India) S Kidambi	19	21	12
Q1	(China) Zhao JP	21	19	21
PFQ	(Denmark) A Antonsen	13	9
3	(Denmark) V Axelsen	21	21
(China) Shi YQ	21	21
(Hong Kong) Hu Y	12	9
(England) R Ouseph	21	18	12
8	(Hong Kong) Ng K L	19	21	21
Q3	(Japan) K Sakai	22	21
(Hong Kong) Wong W K	20	18
(Chinese Taipei) Hsu J-h	9	13
2	(Denmark) J Ø. Jørgensen	21	21

Second Round
(China) Huang YX	16	11
6	(China) Lin D	21	21
Q1	(China) Zhao JP	10	11
3	(Denmark) V Axelsen	21	21
(China) Shi YQ	21	21
8	(Hong Kong) Ng K L	16	14
Q3	(Japan) K Sakai	21	21
2	(Denmark) J Ø. Jørgensen	16	13

Quarterfinals
6	(China) Lin D	8	21	21
3	(Denmark) V Axelsen	21	14	15
(China) Shi YQ	21	21
Q3	(Japan) K Sakai	13	4

Semifinals
6	(China) Lin D	22	11
(China) Shi YQ	24	21

=== Finals ===
Semifinals
1	(Malaysia) Lee Chong Wei	10	21	21
(Chinese Taipei) Chou Tien-chen	21	14	9
6	(China) Lin Dan	22	11
(China) Shi Yuqi	24	21

Final
1	(Malaysia) Lee Chong Wei	21	21
(China) Shi Yuqi	12	10

== Women's singles ==
=== Seeds ===
1. (Chinese Taipei) Tai Tzu-ying (champion)
2. (Spain) Carolina Marín (quarterfinals)
3. (South Korea) Sung Ji-hyun (semifinals)
4. (China) Sun Yu (quarterfinals)
5. (Thailand) Ratchanok Intanon (final)
6. (India) P. V. Sindhu (quarterfinals)
7. (Japan) Akane Yamaguchi (semifinals)
8. (India) Saina Nehwal (quarterfinals)

=== Top half ===
First Round
1	(Chinese Taipei) Tai T-y	21	21
(Thailand) N Jindapol	18	14
(Japan) M Mitani	21	21
(Spain) B Corrales	7	11
6	(India) P. V. Sindhu	21	21
(Denmark) M Poulsen	10	11
Q3	(Denmark) N K Rohde	19	20
(Indonesia) D D Ayustine	21	22
3	(South Korea) Sung J-h	21	21
(Indonesia) Fitriani	18	12
(Hong Kong) Yip P Y	21	21
Q2	(England) F M Chapman	12	19
8	(India) S Nehwal	21	21
(Japan) N Okuhara	15	14
Q4	(Germany) F Deprez	19	21	21
Q1	(France) D Lansac	21	15	18

Second Round
1	(Chinese Taipei) Tai T-y	27	21
(Japan) M Mitani	25	11
6	(India) P. V. Sindhu	21	21
(Indonesia) D D Ayustine	12	4
3	(South Korea) Sung J-h	15	21	21
(Hong Kong) Yip P Y	21	16	9
8	(India) S Nehwal	21	21
Q4	(Germany) F Deprez	18	10

Quarterfinals
1	(Chinese Taipei) Tai T-y	21	21
6	(India) P. V. Sindhu	14	10
3	(South Korea) Sung J-h	22	22
8	(India) S Nehwal	20	20

Semifinals
1	(Chinese Taipei) Tai T-y	11	21	21
3	(South Korea) Sung J-h	21	14	14

=== Bottom half ===
First Round
(Bulgaria) L Zetchiri	11	21	14
(Chinese Taipei) Chiang M-h	21	19	21
(Singapore) Liang XY	16	12
7	(Japan) A Yamaguchi	21	21
(China) Chen YF	18	21	21
(Thailand) B Ongbamrungphan	21	15	11
(United States) B Zhang	17	15
4	(China) Sun Y	21	21
(Hong Kong) Cheung N Y	21	18	18
(Chinese Taipei) Hsu Y-c	17	21	21
(Japan) S Sato	14	9
5	(Thailand) R Intanon	21	21
(South Korea) Kim H-m	12	20
(China) He BJ	21	22
(Denmark) L Kjærsfeldt	12	17
2	(Spain) C Marín	21	21

Second Round
(Chinese Taipei) Chiang M-h	19	22	15
7	(Japan) A Yamaguchi	21	20	21
(China) Chen YF	15	14
4	(China) Sun Y	21	21
(Chinese Taipei) Hsu Y-c	14	15
5	(Thailand) R Intanon	21	21
(China) He BJ	21	19	10
2	(Spain) C Marín	15	21	21

Quarterfinals
7	(Japan) A Yamaguchi	21	21	22
4	(China) Sun Y	23	14	20
5	(Thailand) R Intanon	22	13	21
2	(Spain) C Marín	20	21	18

Semifinals
7	(Japan) A Yamaguchi	20	16
5	(Thailand) R Intanon	22	21

=== Finals ===
Semifinals
1	(Chinese Taipei) Tai Tzu-ying	11	21	21
3	(South Korea) Sung Ji-hyun	21	14	14
7	(Japan) Akane Yamaguchi	20	16
5	(Thailand) Ratchanok Intanon	22	21

Final
1	(Chinese Taipei) Tai Tzu-ying	21	22
5	(Thailand) Ratchanok Intanon	16	20

== Men's doubles ==
=== Seeds ===
1. (Malaysia) Goh V Shem / Tan Wee Kiong (quarterfinals)
2. (Denmark) Mathias Boe / Carsten Mogensen (first round)
3. (Japan) Takeshi Kamura / Keigo Sonoda (quarterfinals)
4. (China) Chai Biao / Hong Wei (quarterfinals)
5. (Indonesia) Marcus Fernaldi Gideon / Kevin Sanjaya Sukamuljo (champion)
6. (China) Li Junhui / Liu Yuchen (final)
7. (Indonesia) Angga Pratama / Ricky Karanda Suwardi (second round)
8. (Denmark) Mads Conrad-Petersen / Mads Pieler Kolding (semifinals)

=== Top half ===
First Round
1	(Malaysia) Goh V S (Malaysia) Tan W K	21	21
(Japan) T Hoki (Japan) Y Kobayashi	15	18
(China) Liu XL (China) Xu C	21	21
Q3	(Japan) H Endo (Japan) Y Watanabe	17	14
6	(China) Li JH (China) Liu YC	21	21
(Indonesia) F Alfian (Indonesia) M R Ardianto	19	16
Q1	(Netherlands) J Arends (Netherlands) R Jille	14	13
(Thailand) B Issara (Thailand) N Puangpuapech	21	21
3	(Japan) T Kamura (Japan) K Sonoda	21	21
(Chinese Taipei) Chen H-l (Chinese Taipei) Wang C-l	17	18
(Denmark) K Astrup (Denmark) A S Rasmussen	21	20	21
(Chinese Taipei) Lee J-h (Chinese Taipei) Lee Y	13	22	11
7	(Indonesia) A Pratama (Indonesia) R K Suwardi	27	21
(England) M Ellis (England) C Langridge	25	19
Q2	(China) Liu C (China) Zhang N	21	16	21
(Thailand) K Kedren (Thailand) D Puavaranukroh	11	21	13

Second Round
1	(Malaysia) Goh V S (Malaysia) Tan W K	21	21
(China) Liu XL (China) Xu C	12	16
6	(China) Li JH (China) Liu YC	21	21
(Thailand) B Issara (Thailand) N Puangpuapech	18	18
3	(Japan) T Kamura (Japan) K Sonoda	21	21
(Denmark) K Astrup (Denmark) A S Rasmussen	18	15
7	(Indonesia) A Pratama (Indonesia) R K Suwardi	14	7
Q2	(China) Liu C (China) Zhang N	21	21

Quarterfinals
1	(Malaysia) Goh V S (Malaysia) Tan W K	19	21	19
6	(China) Li JH (China) Liu YC	21	17	21
3	(Japan) T Kamura (Japan) K Sonoda	23	15	19
Q2	(China) Liu C (China) Zhang N	21	21	21

Semifinals
6	(China) Li JH (China) Liu YC	21	21
Q2	(China) Liu C (China) Zhang N	18	14

=== Bottom half ===
First Round
Q4	(England) P Briggs (England) T Wolfenden	21	10	21
(India) M Attri (India) B. S Reddy	19	21	18
(Indonesia) H Setiawan (Malaysia) Tan B H	12	17
5	(Indonesia) M F Gideon (Indonesia) K S Sukamuljo	21	21
(Hong Kong) Or C C (Hong Kong) Tang C M	11	17
(China) Huang KX (China) Wang YL	21	21
(Denmark) M Christiansen (Denmark) D Daugaard	18	19
4	(China) Chai B (China) Hong W	21	21
(Chinese Taipei) Lu C-y (Chinese Taipei) Yang P-h	21	13	21
(Malaysia) Ong Y S (Malaysia) Teo E Y	14	21	18
(Russia) V Ivanov (Russia) I Sozonov	11	15
8	(Denmark) M Conrad-Petersen (Denmark) M Pieler Kolding	21	21
(Hong Kong) Law C H (Hong Kong) Lee C H	13	21	10
(Indonesia) M Ahsan (Indonesia) R A Saputro	21	16	21
(China) Lu K (China) Zheng SW	21	22
2	(Denmark) M Boe (Denmark) C Mogensen	15	20

Second Round
Q4	(England) P Briggs (England) T Wolfenden	13	14
5	(Indonesia) M F Gideon (Indonesia) K S Sukamuljo	21	21
(China) Huang KX (China) Wang YL	21	17	13
4	(China) Chai B (China) Hong W	18	21	21
(Chinese Taipei) Lu C-y (Chinese Taipei) Yang P-h	25	17
8	(Denmark) M Conrad-Petersen (Denmark) M Pieler Kolding	27	21
(Indonesia) M Ahsan (Indonesia) R A Saputro	19	21	18
(China) Lu K (China) Zheng SW	21	9	21

Quarterfinals
5	(Indonesia) M F Gideon (Indonesia) K S Sukamuljo	21	21
4	(China) Chai B (China) Hong W	16	18
8	(Denmark) M Conrad-Petersen (Denmark) M Pieler Kolding	21	11	21
(China) Lu K (China) Zheng SW	12	21	16

Semifinals
5	(Indonesia) M F Gideon (Indonesia) K S Sukamuljo	19	21	21
8	(Denmark) M Conrad-Petersen (Denmark) M Pieler Kolding	21	13	17

=== Finals ===
Semifinals
6	(China) Li Junhui (China) Liu Yuchen	21	21
Q2	(China) Liu Cheng (China) Zhang Nan	18	14
5	(Indonesia) Marcus Fernaldi Gideon (Indonesia) Kevin Sanjaya Sukamuljo	19	21	21
8	(Denmark) Mads Conrad-Petersen (Denmark) Mads Pieler Kolding	21	13	17

Final
6	(China) Li Junhui (China) Liu Yuchen	19	14
5	(Indonesia) Marcus Fernaldi Gideon (Indonesia) Kevin Sanjaya Sukamuljo	21	21

== Women's doubles ==
=== Seeds ===
1. (Japan) Misaki Matsutomo / Ayaka Takahashi (second round)
2. (Denmark) Kamilla Rytter Juhl / Christinna Pedersen (final)
3. (South Korea) Jung Kyung-eun / Shin Seung-chan (semifinals)
4. (South Korea) Chang Ye-na / Lee So-hee (champion)
5. (China) Chen Qingchen / Jia Yifan (first round)
6. (China) Luo Ying / Luo Yu (quarterfinals)
7. (China) Huang Dongping / Li Yinhui (first round)
8. (Japan) Naoko Fukuman / Kurumi Yonao (quarterfinals)

=== Top half ===
First Round
1	(Japan) M Matsutomo (Japan) A Takahashi	21	21
(Indonesia) D D Haris (Indonesia) R E Putri Sari	15	13
(Japan) Y Fukushima (Japan) S Hirota	21	21
(Bulgaria) M Mitsova (Bulgaria) P Nedelcheva	10	9
7	(China) Huang DP (China) Li YH	13	13
Q4	(China) Bao YX (China) Yu XH	21	21
(Chinese Taipei) Hsu Y-c (Chinese Taipei) Wu T-j	21	21
(India) M Jakkampudi (India) P S Ram	19	12
4	(South Korea) Chang Y-n (South Korea) Lee S-h	21	21
PFQ	(Germany) J Goliszewski (Germany) L Kaepplein	11	5
Q1	(Chinese Taipei) Lin X-m (Chinese Taipei) Wu F-c	21	21
Q2	(Switzerland) N Fankhauser (Malaysia) S Saniru	14	15
6	(China) Luo Y (China) Luo Y	21	16	21
(Bulgaria) G Stoeva (Bulgaria) S Stoeva	16	21	6
(Chinese Taipei) Chiang K-h (Chinese Taipei) Hung S-h	14	16
(China) Huang YQ (China) Tang JH	21	21

Second Round
1	(Japan) M Matsutomo (Japan) A Takahashi	16	21	16
(Japan) Y Fukushima (Japan) S Hirota	21	19	21
Q4	(China) Bao YX (China) Yu XH	21	21
(Chinese Taipei) Hsu Y-c (Chinese Taipei) Wu T-j	14	6
4	(South Korea) Chang Y-n (South Korea) Lee S-h	21	21
Q1	(Chinese Taipei) Lin X-m (Chinese Taipei) Wu F-c	10	9
6	(China) Luo Y (China) Luo Y	21	21
(China) Huang YQ (China) Tang JH	17	13

Quarterfinals
(Japan) Y Fukushima (Japan) S Hirota	11	14
Q4	(China) Bao YX (China) Yu XH	21	21
4	(South Korea) Chang Y-n (South Korea) Lee S-h	21	21
6	(China) Luo Y (China) Luo Y	17	8

Semifinals
Q4	(China) Bao YX (China) Yu XH	18	18
4	(South Korea) Chang Y-n (South Korea) Lee S-h	21	21

=== Bottom half ===
First Round
(Russia) A Chervyakova (Russia) O Morozova	18	21	16
(Indonesia) A S Awanda (Indonesia) A Rahayu	21	16	21
(Japan) S Tanaka (Japan) K Yonemoto	15	28	21
5	(China) Chen QC (China) Jia YF	21	26	18
(Malaysia) Vivian Hoo K M (Malaysia) Woon K W	18	21	21
(Thailand) P Supajirakul (Thailand) S Taerattanachai	21	11	17
(Thailand) J Kititharakul (Thailand) R Prajongjai	19	19
3	(South Korea) Jung K-e (South Korea) Shin S-c	21	21
(Denmark) M Fruergaard (Denmark) S Thygesen	19	17
(Indonesia) G Polii (Indonesia) R A Pradipta	21	21
Q3	(Netherlands) C Seinen (Netherlands) I Tabeling	18	11
8	(Japan) N Fukuman (Japan) K Yonao	21	21
(Denmark) J Finne-Ipsen (Denmark) R Søby	22	9	21
(Indonesia) N K M Istirani (Indonesia) T R Nuraidah	20	21	18
PFQ	(France) É Lefel (France) A Tran	16	16
2	(Denmark) K Rytter Juhl (Denmark) C Pedersen	21	21

Second Round
(Indonesia) A S Awanda (Indonesia) A Rahayu	21	13	11
(Japan) S Tanaka (Japan) K Yonemoto	14	21	21
(Malaysia) Vivian Hoo K M (Malaysia) Woon K W	21	12	17
3	(South Korea) Jung K-e (South Korea) Shin S-c	17	21	21
(Indonesia) G Polii (Indonesia) R A Pradipta	22	8
8	(Japan) N Fukuman (Japan) K Yonao	24	21
(Denmark) J Finne-Ipsen (Denmark) R Søby	14	16
2	(Denmark) K Rytter Juhl (Denmark) C Pedersen	21	21

Quarterfinals
(Japan) S Tanaka (Japan) K Yonemoto	19	17
3	(South Korea) Jung K-e (South Korea) Shin S-c	21	21
8	(Japan) N Fukuman (Japan) K Yonao	12	11
2	(Denmark) K Rytter Juhl (Denmark) C Pedersen	21	21

Semifinals
3	(South Korea) Jung K-e (South Korea) Shin S-c	16	13
2	(Denmark) K Rytter Juhl (Denmark) C Pedersen	21	21

=== Finals ===
Semifinals
Q4	(China) Bao Yixin (China) Yu Xiaohan	18	18
4	(South Korea) Chang Ye-na (South Korea) Lee So-hee	21	21
3	(South Korea) Jung Kyung-eun (South Korea) Shin Seung-chan	16	13
2	(Denmark) Kamilla Rytter Juhl (Denmark) Christinna Pedersen	21	21

Final
4	(South Korea) Chang Ye-na (South Korea) Lee So-hee	21	21
2	(Denmark) Kamilla Rytter Juhl (Denmark) Christinna Pedersen	18	13

== Mixed doubles ==
=== Seeds ===
1. (China) Zheng Siwei / Chen Qingchen (second round)
2. (Indonesia) Tontowi Ahmad / Liliyana Natsir (quarterfinals)
3. (Denmark) Joachim Fischer Nielsen / Christinna Pedersen (quarterfinals)
4. (Indonesia) Praveen Jordan / Debby Susanto (first round)
5. (China) Lu Kai / Huang Yaqiong (champion)
6. (Malaysia) Chan Peng Soon / Goh Liu Ying (final)
7. (England) Chris Adcock / Gabrielle Adcock (semifinals)
8. (Malaysia) Tan Kian Meng / Lai Pei Jing (second round)

=== Top half ===
First Round
1	(China) Zheng SW (China) Chen QC	21	21
(Thailand) D Puavaranukroh (Thailand) S Taerattanachai	10	15
Q3	(China) Wang YL (China) Huang DP	21	21
(South Korea) Choi S-g (South Korea) Chae Y-j	9	16
6	(Malaysia) Chan P S (Malaysia) Goh L Y	21	21
(Sweden) N Ruponen (Sweden) A Högström	12	19
(Indonesia) H Faizal (Indonesia) S D Aulia	16	13
(China) Zhang N (China) Li YH	21	21
4	(Indonesia) P Jordan (Indonesia) D Susanto	17	21	12
(Japan) Y Watanabe (Japan) A Higashino	21	19	21
(Poland) R Mateusiak (Poland) N Zięba	22	21
(Chinese Taipei) Lin C-y (Chinese Taipei) Wu T-j	20	14
8	(Malaysia) Tan K M (Malaysia) Lai P J	21	21
PFQ	(Chinese Taipei) Lu C-y (Chinese Taipei) Chiang K-h	14	19
(South Korea) Yoo Y-s (South Korea) Kim H-n	21	22
(India) P J Chopra (India) N. S Reddy	19	20

Second Round
1	(China) Zheng SW (China) Chen QC	22	15
Q3	(China) Wang YL (China) Huang DP	24	21
6	(Malaysia) Chan P S (Malaysia) Goh L Y	9	23	21
(China) Zhang N (China) Li YH	21	21	17
(Japan) Y Watanabe (Japan) A Higashino	21	21
(Poland) R Mateusiak (Poland) N Zięba	13	18
8	(Malaysia) Tan K M (Malaysia) Lai P J	15	9
(South Korea) Yoo Y-s (South Korea) Kim H-n	21	21

Quarterfinals
Q3	(China) Wang YL (China) Huang DP	21	14
6	(Malaysia) Chan P S (Malaysia) Goh L Y	23	21
(Japan) Y Watanabe (Japan) A Higashino	21	18	22
(South Korea) Yoo Y-s (South Korea) Kim H-n	17	21	20

Semifinals
6	(Malaysia) Chan P S (Malaysia) Goh L Y	21	21
(Japan) Y Watanabe (Japan) A Higashino	17	15

=== Bottom half ===
First Round
PFQ	(Republic of Ireland) S Magee (Republic of Ireland) C Magee	21	16	15
(Hong Kong) Lee C H (Hong Kong) Chau H W	16	21	21
(Indonesia) A E Prasetya (Indonesia) A Saufika	9	17
5	(China) Lu K (China) Huang YQ	21	21
(Japan) K Kazuno (Japan) A Kurihara	21	21
(Denmark) M Christiansen (Denmark) S Thygesen	18	18
(Indonesia) R Alexander (Indonesia) M D Oktavianti	14	5
3	(Denmark) J Fischer Nielsen (Denmark) C Pedersen	21	21
Q4	(Thailand) N Puangpuapech (Thailand) J Kititharakul	9	23
(China) Xu C (China) Du Y	21	25
(Singapore) Terry Hee Y K (Singapore) Tan W H	9	18
7	(England) C Adcock (England) G Adcock	21	21
Q2	(Germany) M Lamsfuss (Germany) I Herttrich	21	17	21
(Thailand) B Issara (Thailand) S Amitrapai	18	21	16
Q1	(Chinese Taipei) Wang C-l (Chinese Taipei) Lee C-h	8	18
2	(Indonesia) T Ahmad (Indonesia) L Natsir	21	21

Second Round
(Hong Kong) Lee C H (Hong Kong) Chau H W	13	21	16
5	(China) Lu K (China) Huang YQ	21	16	21
(Japan) K Kazuno (Japan) A Kurihara	13	11
3	(Denmark) J Fischer Nielsen (Denmark) C Pedersen	21	21
(China) Xu C (China) Du Y	17	12
7	(England) C Adcock (England) G Adcock	21	21
Q2	(Germany) M Lamsfuss (Germany) I Herttrich	12	13
2	(Indonesia) T Ahmad (Indonesia) L Natsir	21	21

Quarterfinals
5	(China) Lu K (China) Huang YQ	21	18	21
3	(Denmark) J Fischer Nielsen (Denmark) C Pedersen	14	21	11
7	(England) C Adcock (England) G Adcock	16	21	21
2	(Indonesia) T Ahmad (Indonesia) L Natsir	21	19	12

Semifinals
5	(China) Lu K (China) Huang YQ	19	21	22
7	(England) C Adcock (England) G Adcock	21	12	20

=== Finals ===
Semifinals
6	(Malaysia) Chan Peng Soon (Malaysia) Goh Liu Ying	21	21
(Japan) Yuta Watanabe (Japan) Arisa Higashino	17	15
5	(China) Lu Kai (China) Huang Yaqiong	19	21	22
7	(England) Chris Adcock (England) Gabrielle Adcock	21	12	20

Final
6	(Malaysia) Chan Peng Soon (Malaysia) Goh Liu Ying	21	19	16
5	(China) Lu Kai (China) Huang Yaqiong	18	21	21

Preceded by 2016 All England Super Series Premier	All England Open Badminton Championships	Succeeded by 2018 All England Open
Preceded by 2016 BWF Super Series Masters Finals	BWF Super Series; 2017 BWF Season	Succeeded by 2017 India Super Series
