= Marcus Fernaldi Gideon =

Indonesian badminton player

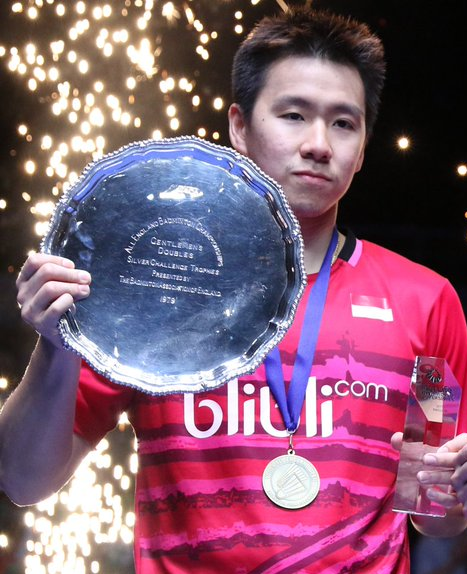
- Gideon at the 2017 All England Open

Personal information
- Born: 9 March 1991 (age 35) Jakarta, Indonesia
- Years active: 2010–2024
- Height: 1.68 m (5 ft 6 in)
- Spouse: Agnes Amelinda Mulyadi (m. 2018)

Sport
- Country: Indonesia
- Sport: Badminton
- Handedness: Right
- Coached by: Herry Iman Pierngadi; Aryono Miranat
- Retired: 9 March 2024

Men's doubles
- Career record: 426 wins, 155 losses
- Highest ranking: 1 (with Kevin Sanjaya Sukamuljo, 16 March 2017)
- BWF profile
Medal record
Men's badminton
Representing Indonesia
Sudirman Cup
Bronze medal – third place	2015 Dongguan	Mixed team
Bronze medal – third place	2019 Nanning	Mixed team
Thomas Cup
Gold medal – first place	2020 Aarhus	Men's team
Silver medal – second place	2016 Kunshan	Men's team
Bronze medal – third place	2018 Bangkok	Men's team
Asian Games
Gold medal – first place	2018 Jakarta–Palembang	Men's doubles
Silver medal – second place	2018 Jakarta–Palembang	Men's team
Asian Championships
Silver medal – second place	2019 Wuhan	Men's doubles
Asia Team Championships
Gold medal – first place	2018 Alor Setar	Men's team
Gold medal – first place	2020 Manila	Men's team
SEA Games
Gold medal – first place	2015 Singapore	Men's team
Silver medal – second place	2015 Singapore	Men's doubles

Marcus Fernaldi Gideon (born 9 March 1991) is an Indonesian former professional badminton player who was ranked world No. 1 in the men's doubles by the Badminton World Federation alongside Kevin Sanjaya Sukamuljo. He plays for PB Jaya Raya, and has been a member of the club since June 2018. He and Sukamuljo were recognized as one of the most outstanding players, and awarded as the BWF Best Male Players of the Year for two years in a row after collecting seven Superseries titles in 2017 and eight World Tour titles in 2018, including two back-to-back All England Open titles.

Gideon and Sukamuljo are often referred to as "the Minions" because of their below average height and for their fast and agile playing style, jumping and bouncing just like the Minions in the film Despicable Me. Gillian Clark, a BWF commentator, stated that the fast play shown by Gideon and Sukamuljo have taken the men's doubles game to a new level and makes the matches more exciting to watch.

== Career ==
=== Early life ===
Gideon began his badminton career at the Tangkas Jakarta club when at the age of nine. At 13, he began playing professionally, and received a scholarship to study in Singapore. However, he returned to Indonesia after four months due of an illness and decided not to continue his education abroad. Under the guidance of his father, a former national badminton player, Gideon trained in both singles and doubles. He later won his first international title in the men's singles discipline at the Victorian International, a Future Series event.

=== 2010–2014: Independent player, first Superseries title ===
Gideon was selected to join the national training centre in Cipayung, in the men's doubles team in 2010. During his partnership with Agripina Prima Rahmanto Putra, he won the 2011 Singapore and 2012 Iran International tournaments, and also finished as the runner-up in the 2012 Vietnam and Osaka International. In 2013, he decided to leave the national training centre, reportedly due to his dissatisfaction with the coaching team's decision to leave him and Agrippina out of the All-England championships.

Gideon then returned to the court as an independent player paired with the Beijing 2008 gold medalist, Markis Kido. The pair reached the semi-finals of the 2013 Indonesian Masters Grand Prix Gold before losing to fellow Indonesians, Ronald Alexander and Selvanus Geh in straight games. They captured their first Superseries title at the 2013 French Open after defeating the Malaysian pair, Koo Kien Keat and Tan Boon Heong 21-16, 21-18 in the final.

In 2014, Gideon and Kido reached the semi-finals of the 2014 All England Open before losing to the No. 1 seed at the time and fellow Indonesians, Mohammad Ahsan and Hendra Setiawan, who went on to win the tournament. They ultimately won their second title at the 2014 Indonesia Masters after defeating Selvanus Geh and Kevin Sanjaya Sukamuljo in three sets (21-17, 20-22, 21-14).

=== 2015–2016: "The Minions" and World No. 2 ===
Seeing his achievements with Markis Kido, Gideon was invited by PBSI to rejoin the national team. In early 2015, head coach of the Indonesia national men's doubles juniors, Chafidz Yusuf, paired Gideon with Kevin Sanjaya Sukamuljo, because Selvanus Geh had to resign from the national team due to illness. The new partnership opened the season in Europe playing at the All England and Swiss Open. In England they reached the quarter-finals before falling to the Danish pair Mads Conrad-Petersen and Mads Pieler Kolding. In Switzerland, he and Sukamuljo were stopped in the semi-finals by the Malaysian pair Goh V Shem and Tan Wee Kiong. Gideon then took part in the Sudirman Cup held in Dongguan, China, where Indonesia settled for a bronze medal. At the June SEA Games in Singapore, he helped his team win the gold medal, and in the individual men's doubles event, he and Sukamuljo captured the silver medal.

In July, Gideon and Sukamuljo competing as an unseeded pair in the Chinese Taipei Open, and the duo reached the final by defeating then World Champions Mohammad Ahsan and Hendra Setiawan, but they failed to take the title, losing the final tamely to Fu Haifeng and Zhang Nan. After this tournament, Indonesian badminton fans dub them as "the Minions" because of their below average height and for their fast and agile playing style, jumping and bouncing just like the Minions in the film Despicable Me. The former badminton player who is currently a BWF commentator, Gillian Clark, also highlighted that the fast play shown by Gideon and Sukamuljo have taken the men's doubles game to a new level and makes the matches exciting to watch. In the next tournament, the duo then reached the semi-finals of the Vietnam and Thailand Opens before capturing their first title together at the Chinese Taipei Masters in October where they beat Malaysia' Hoon Thien How and Lim Khim Wah in the finals. In the Hong Kong Open, Gideon and Sukamuljo beat the World Championship silver medalists Liu Xiaolong and Qiu Zihan before losing to top seeded South Koreans Lee Yong-dae and Yoo Yeon-seong in the quarter-finals. In December, they were stopped in the quarter-finals of the Indonesia Masters by second seeds Chai Biao and Hong Wei in three games. They ended the 2015 season ranked 16th in the world.

Gideon and Sukamuljo started their 2016 tour by winning the Malaysia Masters in January. Their performance continued to improve and they won the Superseries title in India and Australia, followed by the Superseries Premier title in China. In May, Gideon participated in the Thomas Cup held in Kunshan, China, but he failed to contribute points to the Indonesian team during the Thomas Cup Group B tie against Thailand. and was not selected to play in the knockout stage of the tournament between qualifying teams. Here Indonesia won the silver medal, losing the final 2 matches to 3 against Denmark. At the end of 2016, he and Sukamuljo reached the top 10 world ranking, and qualified to compete at the BWF Superseries Finals held in Dubai. The duo failed to advance to the knock out stage after standing in the third position in the group stage, having won a match against their compatriots Angga Pratama and Ricky Karanda Suwardi, and losing two matches to Danish and Japanese pairs. Nevertheless, at year's end Gideon and Sukamuljo occupied the number 2 position in the world rankings.

=== 2017: World number 1 ===
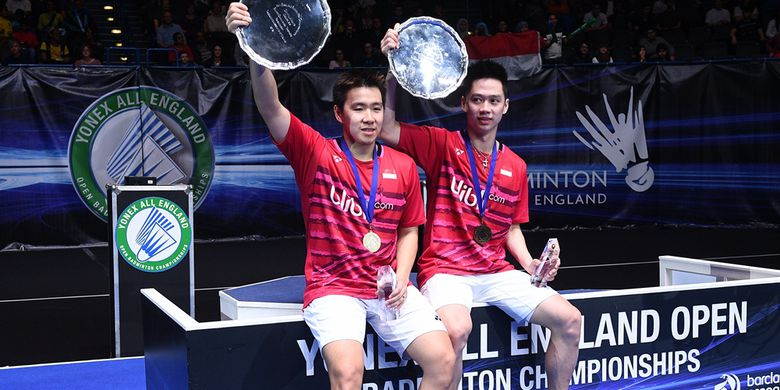
Gideon and Kevin Sanjaya Sukamuljo won the 2017 All England Open

Now competing only in the world's biggest events, Gideon and Sukamuljo began the 2017 by making up for their 2016 first round defeat with a tournament victory at the coveted All England Open in March, thus earning a number one men's doubles world ranking. They then secured their second consecutive India Open title, and after that won the Malaysia Open. Their remarkable winning run was then stopped by Danish veterans Mathias Boe and Carsten Mogensen in the semi-finals of the Singapore Open. In May, they played for Indonesia at the Sudirman Cup held in Australia. In group round robin play they won their country's only point in its surprising loss to India but in group play against Denmark they again lost to Boe and Mogensen, as Indonesia, for the first time in the Cup's 28-year history, was eliminated in the group stage of the competition. In June the duo was upset by another Danish pair, Kim Astrup and Anders Skaarup Rasmussen, in the first round of Indonesia Open.

In August, Gideon and Sukamuljo went to the World Championships held in Glasgow, Scotland, as third seeds, but lost in the quarter-finals to China's Chai Biao and Hong Wei in three close games. In September they reached the final of the Korea Open but were again beaten by Boe and Morgensen, however, one week later they exacted a measure of revenge against the Danes in the semi-finals of Japan Open, then went on to win the tournament by defeating the host pair of Takuto Inoue and Yuki Kaneko. In October, Gideon and Sukamuljo lost the final of the Denmark Open in a tight match to reigning World Champion Liu Cheng and Zhang Nan. Citing an arm injury suffered during their semi-final match in Denmark, Gideon withdrew from the next Superseries tournament in France. Back together in November, Gideon and Sukamuljo reduce their head-to-head margin against Boe and Mogensen to 3–4, after defeating them in the finals and securing their second China Open title. They won the Hong Kong Open a week later, their sixth Superseries victory of the season, thus equaling the previous men's doubles record of six set by South Koreans Lee Yong-dae and Yoo Yeon-seong in 2015. For their achievements Gideon and Sukamuljo were named Best Male Players of the Year by the Badminton World Federation. The duo then closed out the year by capturing the Dubai World Superseries Finals, making them the first men's doubles pair to win seven Superseries titles in a year.

=== 2018: Asian Games gold medalists ===
Under the new BWF player commitment regulations, Gideon and Sukamuljo who ranked as world number 1, are obligated to play in 12 BWF World Tour. They were unbeaten in the first 3 tournaments that they participated in, capturing his second Indonesia Masters and All England Open, and also his third India Open titles. He and sukamuljo then defeated at the quarter-finals of Malaysia Open by Chinese pair He Jiting and Tan Qiang. In July, he and his partner won the Indonesia Open. At the 2018 World Championships, Gideon and Sukamuljo lost in the quarter-finals to Takeshi Kamura and Keigo Sonoda in straight games.

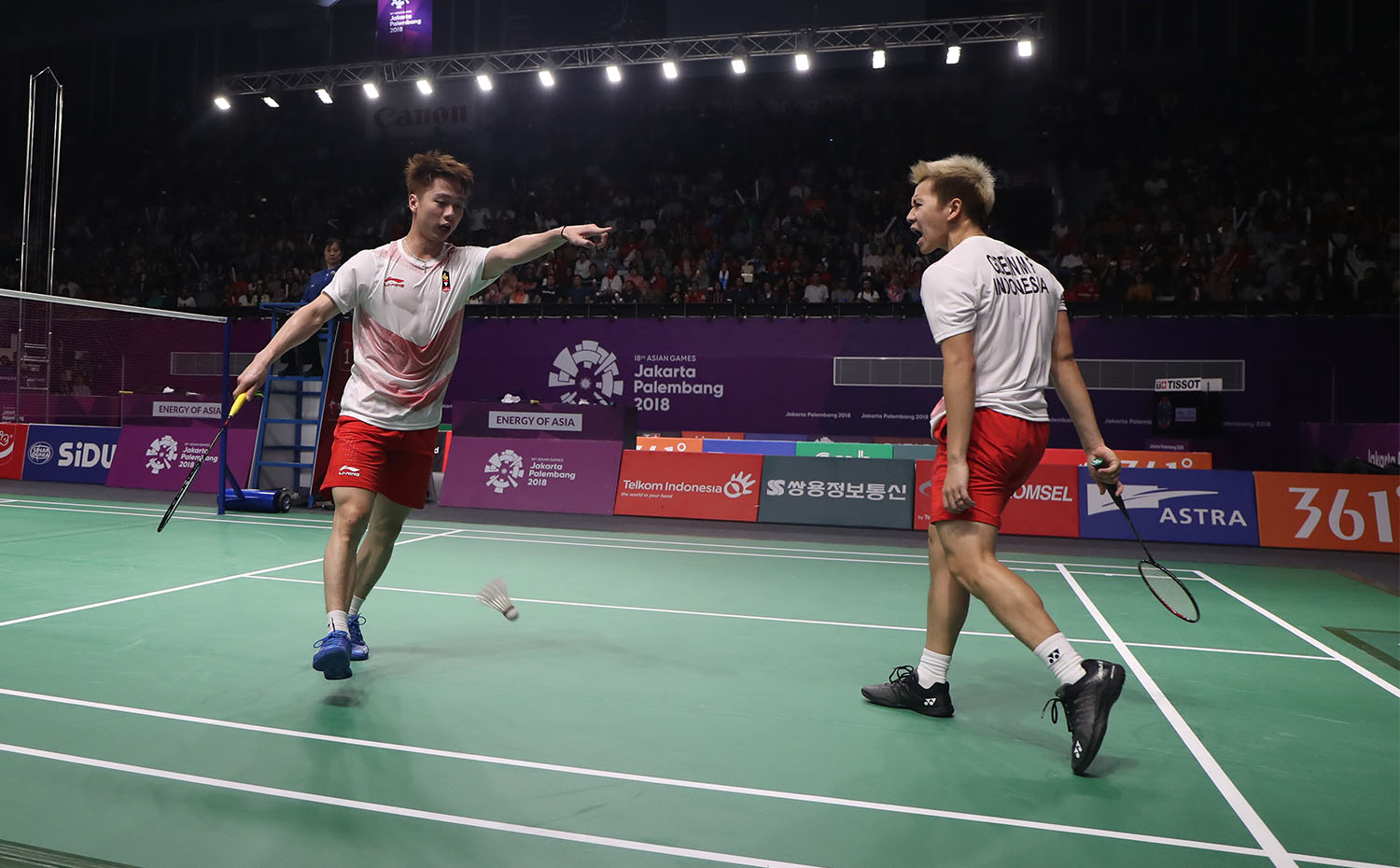
Gideon and Kevin Sanjaya Sukamuljo at the 2018 Asian Games in Jakarta

Gideon competed at the 2018 Asian Games, won a silver in the team events, and then captured the men's doubles gold medal, after he and his partner, Sukamuljo, beat their compatriots Fajar Alfian and Muhammad Rian Ardianto in close rubber games in the final. In September, Gideon and Sukamuljo retained their Japan Open title, defeating the reigning World Champions Li Junhui and Liu Yuchen. A week later, they finished as semi-finalists in China Open, lost to Han Chengkai and Zhou Haodong of China. On the Europe tour in October, they clinched the Denmark Open title. But in France, they again defeated by Han and Zhou in the final, made their head-to-head record deficit to 1–2. In November, the duo won the Fuzhou China Open and Hong Kong Open. After the victory they achieved in Hong Kong, Gideon and Sukamuljo managed to set a record as the first ever men's doubles pair to win eight world tour titles in a season. At the 2018 BWF World Tour Finals gala dinner, the duo then awarded as the BWF Best Male Players of the Year for two consecutive year. As the defending champions of the World Tour Finals, they had to withdraw from the competition before their last group match, due to the neck injury suffered by Gideon.

=== 2019: Eight World Tour titles ===
Gideon opened the season in January by winning his second Malaysia Masters and third Indonesia Masters titles. Gideon and Sukamuljo reached his record 20th titles at the Superseries/Super 500 above tournaments. They then played at the Asian Championships held in Wuhan, China as first seed, and proceeded to the final, but inflicted a crushing defeat by number 5 seed Hiroyuki Endo and Yuta Watanabe. Gideon then played with Indonesia mixed team at the Nanning Sudirman Cup, where he and his partner, Sukamuljo, have never lost in their three matches against England, Chinese Taipei and Japan, but the team ended their journey in the competition after lost 1–3 in the semi-finals tie against Japan. In the second half of the 2019 season, Gideon and Sukamuljo won the Indonesia and Japan Opens in July; China Open in September; Denmark and French Opens in October; and also the Fuzhou China Open in November. Gideon and Sukamuljo were nominated for the Best Male Player award, but failed to retain the award after being defeated by Kento Momota. They entered the World Tour Finals as the first seed. In the group stage, they beat Li Junhui and Liu Yuchen, lost to Endo and Watanabe, and then in the last match, they won against Takeshi Kamura and Keigo Sonoda, progressed to the next round as group runners-up. In the semi-final, they again defeated by the Japanese pair Endo and Watanabe, made their head-to-head record deficit to 2–5. Gideon ended the 2019 season by winning eight World Tour titles, including three in a row at Denmark, France and China.

=== 2020–2021: The Thomas Cup: World men's team champions ===
Gideon and his partner, Sukamuljo started the 2020 season by playing in the Malaysia Masters. However, they finished in the quarter-finals after losing to Fajar Alfian and Muhammad Rian Ardianto in a close rubber game. Gideon later won his fourth Indonesia Masters title (third with Sukamuljo) by defeating Mohammad Ahsan and Hendra Setiawan in straight games in the final. In February, he alongside Indonesia men's team won the Asia Team Championships held in Manila. In March, they played at the All England Open. The duo failed to win the title after lost to Hiroyuki Endo and Yuta Watanabe in the final. This was their sixth loss in a row over Endo and Watanabe. Due to the COVID-19 pandemic, numerous tournaments on the 2020 BWF World Tour were either cancelled or rescheduled for later in the year. Gideon and Sukamuljo planned to return in the international competitions at the 2020 Asian Leg tournament in January 2021, but then they had to withdraw from the competition after his partner, Sukamuljo, tested positive for COVID-19 in December 2020.

Gideon made his comeback at the All England Open in March 2021. He and Sukamuljo had played in the first round by beating the host pair Matthew Clare and Ethan van Leeuwen in a rubber game, but later Indonesia team were forced to withdraw from the competition by BWF after the team members will self-isolate for 10 days from the date of their inbound flight after an anonym person traveling onboard tested positive for COVID-19. In July 2021, Gideon competed at the 2020 Summer Olympics partnering Sukamuljo as first seed. The duo led the group standings after won two matches and lost a match. Gideon and Sukamuljo were eliminated from the competition by Malaysian pair Aaron Chia and Soh Wooi Yik in the quarter-finals.

In September–October, Gideon alongside Indonesia team competed at the 2021 Sudirman Cup in Vantaa, Finland. The team advanced to the knocked-out stage, but stopped in the quarter-finals to Malaysia. In the next tournament in Aarhus, Denmark, he helped Indonesia team reached the final of the World Men's Team Championships, and the team won the 2020 Thomas Cup. In the next tournament, Gideon and Sukamuljo played at the BWF World Tour in Denmark, French, and Hylo Opens. The duo ended the tour by winning the Hylo Open. At the Indonesia badminton festival, they finished as runner-up in the Indonesia Masters and triumph in the Indonesia Open. This was their three successive victory at the Indonesia Open following on from success in 2018 and 2019. Their achievements in 2021, lead them as the first seed in the BWF World Tour Finals. The duo reached the final, but lost a well contested match to Japan's Takuro Hoki and Yugo Kobayashi in a close rubber games.

=== 2022 ===
In 2022, Gideon and his partner, Sukamuljo, started the BWF tour in the All England Open. Unfortunately, they were stopped in the semi-finals by the young compatriot, the eventual champions, Muhammad Shohibul Fikri and Bagas Maulana. In April, Gideon flew to Porto, Portugal underwent surgery to remove pieces of bone on his ankles performed by surgeon Niek van Dijk. Even though he has not fully recovered, Gideon returned to the tournament court in June, to compete in the Indonesia Masters and Open. At that tournament, Gideon and Sukamuljo finished as semi-finalists in the Indonesia Masters, and stopped in the second round in the Indonesia Open. They then stepped on podium in October as runner-up of the Denmark Open, losing the final to Fajar Alfian and Muhammad Rian Ardianto.

=== 2023 ===
Gideon and his partner, Sukamuljo, started the BWF tour in the Malaysia Open, but were stopped in the second round by a Chinese pair, Liang Weikeng and Wang Chang. In the next tournament, they lost again to Liang and Wang in the quarter-finals of the India Open. They competed at the home tournament, Indonesia Masters, but retired in the second round from Chinese pair Liu Yuchen and Ou Xuanyi following the injury of Gideon.

In May, Gideon alongside the Indonesian team competed at the 2023 Sudirman Cup in Suzhou, China. He won a match in the group stage, against Kevin Lee and Ty Alexander Lindeman of Canada. Indonesia advanced to the knockout stage but lost at the quarter-finals against China. In the following week, Gideon and his partner, Sukamuljo, competed in the Malaysia Masters, but lost in the second round to the 4th seeds Takuro Hoki and Yugo Kobayashi in straight games. In the next tour, they competed at the Thailand Open, but lost in the semi-finals to the 3rd seeds and eventual winners Liang Weikeng and Wang Chang in straight games. In June, Gideon competed at the Singapore Open, but lost in the second round to the 4th seeded Japanese pair Takuro Hoki and Yugo Kobayashi in straight games.

Following Singapore Open, Gideon and Sukamuljo ended their eight-year partnership after Gideon was forced to take a break from competition to undergo a surgery on his right leg. Sukamuljo subsequently formed a new partnership with Rahmat Hidayat. Gideon later returned to competition alongside a new partner, Rayhan Fadillah, at the 2023 Syed Modi International and 2023 Guwahati Masters, where the pair reached the round of 32 and quarter-finals, respectively.

=== Retirement ===
On 9 March 2024, on his thirty-third birthday, Gideon officially announced his retirement from professional badminton, citing a desire to spend time with his family and coach alongside his father.

== Personal life ==
Gideon is the son of former national badminton player, Kurniahu, who served as a coach at Marcus' namesake badminton academy in Ciangsana, Bogor Regency. He married a general practitioner, Agnes Amelinda Mulyadi on 14 April 2018. His first son Marcus Fernaldi Gideon Jr. was born in January 2019.

== Awards and nominations ==
Award	Year	Category	Result	Ref.
AORI	2018	Best Male Athlete with Kevin Sanjaya Sukamuljo	Won	
BWF Awards	2017	BWF Best Male Player of the Year with Kevin Sanjaya Sukamuljo	Won	
BWF Awards	2018	BWF Best Male Player of the Year with Kevin Sanjaya Sukamuljo	Won	
BWF Awards	2019	BWF Best Male Player of the Year with Kevin Sanjaya Sukamuljo	Nominated	
Forbes	2020	30 Under 30 Asia (Entertainment and Sports with Kevin Sanjaya Sukamuljo)	Placed	
Forbes	2020	30 Under 30 Indonesia (Young achievers & game changers with Kevin Sanjaya Sukamuljo)	Placed	
Gatra Awards	2021	Sports Category with 2020 Thomas Cup squad	Won	
Golden Award SIWO PWI	2019	Best Male Athlete with Kevin Sanjaya Sukamuljo	Won	
Golden Award SIWO PWI	2019	Favorite Team with 2018 Asian Games men's badminton team	Nominated	
Golden Award SIWO PWI	2020	Favorite Male Athlete with Kevin Sanjaya Sukamuljo	Won	
Indonesian Sport Awards	2018	Athlete of the Year with Kevin Sanjaya Sukamuljo	Won	
Indonesian Sport Awards	2018	Favorite Male Athlete Duos with Kevin Sanjaya Sukamuljo	Won	

== Achievements ==
=== Asian Games ===
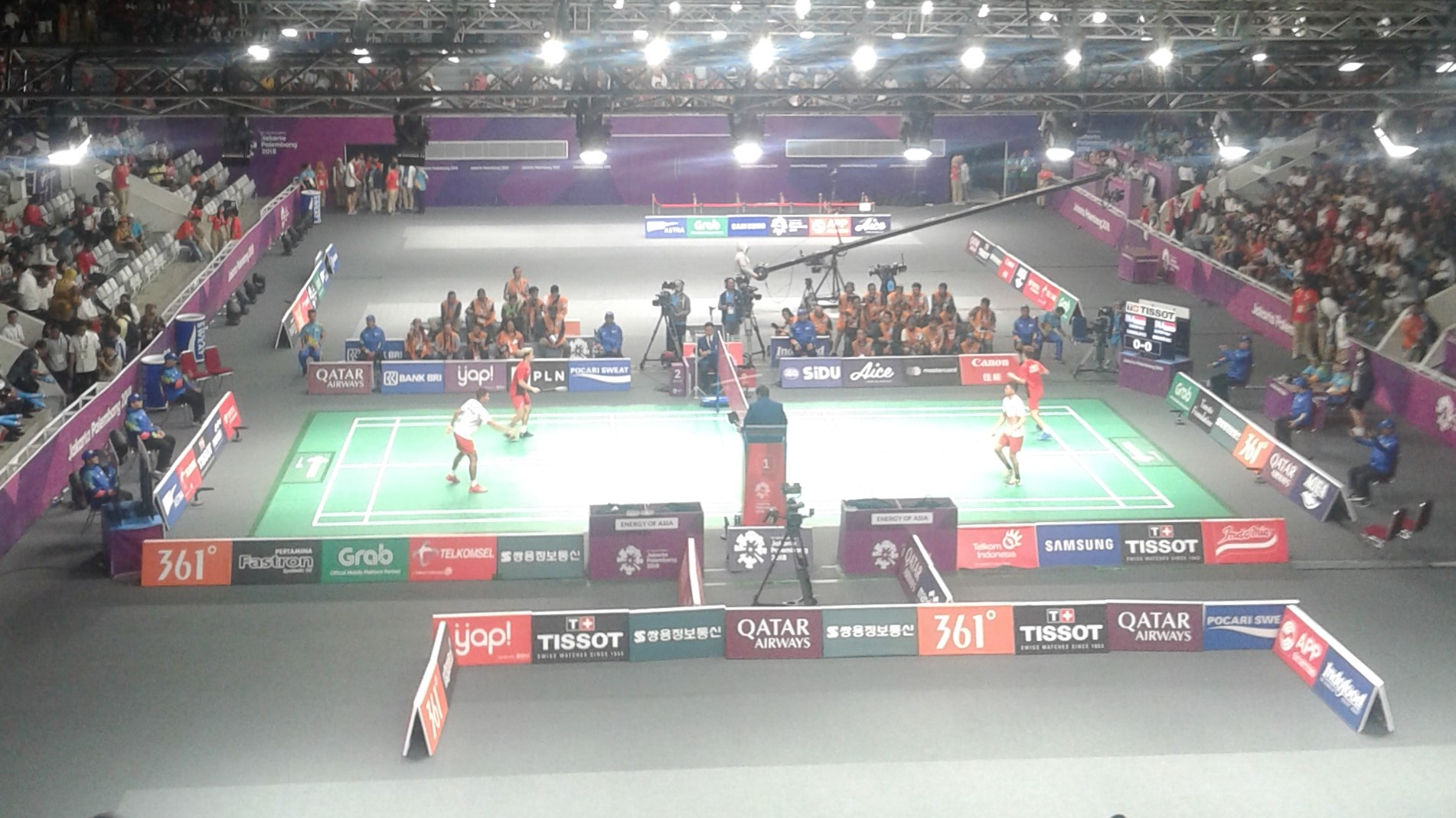
Gideon and Sukamuljo warmed up before the 2018 Asian Games final

Men's doubles
Year	Venue	Partner	Opponent	Score	Result	Ref.
2018	Istora Gelora Bung Karno; Jakarta, Indonesia	(Indonesia) Kevin Sanjaya Sukamuljo	(Indonesia) Fajar Alfian (Indonesia) Muhammad Rian Ardianto	13–21, 21–18, 24–22	Gold	

=== Asian Championships ===
Men's doubles
Year	Venue	Partner	Opponent	Score	Result	Ref.
2019	Wuhan Sports Center Gymnasium; Wuhan, China	(Indonesia) Kevin Sanjaya Sukamuljo	(Japan) Hiroyuki Endo (Japan) Yuta Watanabe	18–21, 3–21	Silver	

=== SEA Games ===
Men's doubles
Year	Venue	Partner	Opponent	Score	Result	Ref.
2015	Singapore Indoor Stadium, Singapore	(Indonesia) Kevin Sanjaya Sukamuljo	(Indonesia) Angga Pratama (Indonesia) Ricky Karanda Suwardi	12–21, 22–24	Silver	

=== BWF World Tour (19 titles, 6 runners-up) ===
The BWF World Tour, which was announced on 19 March 2017 and implemented in 2018, is a series of elite badminton tournaments sanctioned by the Badminton World Federation (BWF). The BWF World Tour is divided into levels of World Tour Finals, Super 1000, Super 750, Super 500, Super 300 (part of the HSBC World Tour), and the BWF Tour Super 100.

Men's doubles
Year	Tournament	Level	Partner	Opponent	Score	Result	Ref.
2018	Indonesia Masters	Super 500	(Indonesia) Kevin Sanjaya Sukamuljo	(China) Li Junhui (China) Liu Yuchen	11–21, 21–10, 21–16	(gold) Winner	
2018	India Open	Super 500	(Indonesia) Kevin Sanjaya Sukamuljo	(Denmark) Kim Astrup (Denmark) Anders Skaarup Rasmussen	21–14, 21–16	(gold) Winner	
2018	All England Open	Super 1000	(Indonesia) Kevin Sanjaya Sukamuljo	(Denmark) Mathias Boe (Denmark) Carsten Mogensen	21–18, 21–17	(gold) Winner	
2018	Indonesia Open	Super 1000	(Indonesia) Kevin Sanjaya Sukamuljo	(Japan) Takuto Inoue (Japan) Yuki Kaneko	21–13, 21–16	(gold) Winner	
2018	Japan Open	Super 750	(Indonesia) Kevin Sanjaya Sukamuljo	(China) Li Junhui (China) Liu Yuchen	21–11, 21–13	(gold) Winner	
2018	Denmark Open	Super 750	(Indonesia) Kevin Sanjaya Sukamuljo	(Japan) Takeshi Kamura (Japan) Keigo Sonoda	21–15, 21–16	(gold) Winner	
2018	French Open	Super 750	(Indonesia) Kevin Sanjaya Sukamuljo	(China) Han Chengkai (China) Zhou Haodong	21–23, 21–8, 17–21	(silver) Runner-up	
2018	Fuzhou China Open	Super 750	(Indonesia) Kevin Sanjaya Sukamuljo	(China) He Jiting (China) Tan Qiang	25–27, 21–17, 21–15	(gold) Winner	
2018	Hong Kong Open	Super 500	(Indonesia) Kevin Sanjaya Sukamuljo	(Japan) Takeshi Kamura (Japan) Keigo Sonoda	21–13, 21–12	(gold) Winner	
2019	Malaysia Masters	Super 500	(Indonesia) Kevin Sanjaya Sukamuljo	(Malaysia) Ong Yew Sin (Malaysia) Teo Ee Yi	21–15, 21–16	(gold) Winner	
2019	Indonesia Masters	Super 500	(Indonesia) Kevin Sanjaya Sukamuljo	(Indonesia) Mohammad Ahsan (Indonesia) Hendra Setiawan	21–17, 21–11	(gold) Winner	
2019	Indonesia Open	Super 1000	(Indonesia) Kevin Sanjaya Sukamuljo	(Indonesia) Mohammad Ahsan (Indonesia) Hendra Setiawan	21–19, 21–16	(gold) Winner	
2019	Japan Open	Super 750	(Indonesia) Kevin Sanjaya Sukamuljo	(Indonesia) Mohammad Ahsan (Indonesia) Hendra Setiawan	21–18, 23–21	(gold) Winner	
2019	China Open	Super 1000	(Indonesia) Kevin Sanjaya Sukamuljo	(Indonesia) Mohammad Ahsan (Indonesia) Hendra Setiawan	21–18, 17–21, 21–15	(gold) Winner	
2019	Denmark Open	Super 750	(Indonesia) Kevin Sanjaya Sukamuljo	(Indonesia) Mohammad Ahsan (Indonesia) Hendra Setiawan	21–14, 21–13	(gold) Winner	
2019	French Open	Super 750	(Indonesia) Kevin Sanjaya Sukamuljo	(India) Satwiksairaj Rankireddy (India) Chirag Shetty	21–18, 21–16	(gold) Winner	
2019	Fuzhou China Open	Super 750	(Indonesia) Kevin Sanjaya Sukamuljo	(Japan) Takeshi Kamura (Japan) Keigo Sonoda	21–17, 21–9	(gold) Winner	
2020	Indonesia Masters	Super 500	(Indonesia) Kevin Sanjaya Sukamuljo	(Indonesia) Mohammad Ahsan (Indonesia) Hendra Setiawan	21–15, 21–16	(gold) Winner	
2020	All England Open	Super 1000	(Indonesia) Kevin Sanjaya Sukamuljo	(Japan) Hiroyuki Endo (Japan) Yuta Watanabe	18–21, 21–12, 19–21	(silver) Runner-up	
2021	French Open	Super 750	(Indonesia) Kevin Sanjaya Sukamuljo	(South Korea) Ko Sung-hyun (South Korea) Shin Baek-cheol	17–21, 20–22	(silver) Runner-up	
2021	Hylo Open	Super 500	(Indonesia) Kevin Sanjaya Sukamuljo	(Indonesia) Leo Rolly Carnando (Indonesia) Daniel Marthin	21–14, 21–19	(gold) Winner	
2021	Indonesia Masters	Super 750	(Indonesia) Kevin Sanjaya Sukamuljo	(Japan) Takuro Hoki (Japan) Yugo Kobayashi	11–21, 21–17, 19–21	(silver) Runner-up	
2021	Indonesia Open	Super 1000	(Indonesia) Kevin Sanjaya Sukamuljo	(Japan) Takuro Hoki (Japan) Yugo Kobayashi	21–14, 21–18	(gold) Winner	
2021	BWF World Tour Finals	World Tour Finals	(Indonesia) Kevin Sanjaya Sukamuljo	(Japan) Takuro Hoki (Japan) Yugo Kobayashi	16–21, 21–13, 17–21	(silver) Runner-up	
2022	Denmark Open	Super 750	(Indonesia) Kevin Sanjaya Sukamuljo	(Indonesia) Fajar Alfian (Indonesia) Muhammad Rian Ardianto	19–21, 26–28	(silver) Runner-up	

=== BWF Superseries (11 titles, 2 runners-up) ===
The BWF Superseries, which was launched on 14 December 2006 and implemented in 2007, was a series of elite badminton tournaments, sanctioned by the Badminton World Federation (BWF). BWF Superseries levels were Superseries and Superseries Premier. A season of Superseries consisted of twelve tournaments around the world that had been introduced since 2011. Successful players were invited to the Superseries Finals, which were held at the end of each year.

Men's doubles
Year	Tournament	Partner	Opponent	Score	Result	Ref.
2013	French Open	(Indonesia) Markis Kido	(Malaysia) Koo Kien Keat (Malaysia) Tan Boon Heong	21–16, 21–18	(gold) Winner	
2016	India Open	(Indonesia) Kevin Sanjaya Sukamuljo	(Indonesia) Angga Pratama (Indonesia) Ricky Karanda Suwardi	21–17, 21–13	(gold) Winner	
2016	Australian Open	(Indonesia) Kevin Sanjaya Sukamuljo	(Indonesia) Angga Pratama (Indonesia) Ricky Karanda Suwardi	21–14, 21–15	(gold) Winner	
2016	China Open	(Indonesia) Kevin Sanjaya Sukamuljo	(Denmark) Mathias Boe (Denmark) Carsten Mogensen	21–18, 22–20	(gold) Winner	
2017	All England Open	(Indonesia) Kevin Sanjaya Sukamuljo	(China) Li Junhui (China) Liu Yuchen	21–19, 21–14	(gold) Winner	
2017	India Open	(Indonesia) Kevin Sanjaya Sukamuljo	(Indonesia) Angga Pratama (Indonesia) Ricky Karanda Suwardi	21–11, 21–15	(gold) Winner	
2017	Malaysia Open	(Indonesia) Kevin Sanjaya Sukamuljo	(China) Fu Haifeng (China) Zheng Siwei	21–14, 14–21, 21–12	(gold) Winner	
2017	Korea Open	(Indonesia) Kevin Sanjaya Sukamuljo	(Denmark) Mathias Boe (Denmark) Carsten Mogensen	19–21, 21–19, 15–21	(silver) Runner-up	
2017	Japan Open	(Indonesia) Kevin Sanjaya Sukamuljo	(Japan) Takuto Inoue (Japan) Yuki Kaneko	21–12, 21–15	(gold) Winner	
2017	Denmark Open	(Indonesia) Kevin Sanjaya Sukamuljo	(China) Liu Cheng (China) Zhang Nan	16–21, 24–22, 19–21	(silver) Runner-up	
2017	China Open	(Indonesia) Kevin Sanjaya Sukamuljo	(Denmark) Mathias Boe (Denmark) Carsten Mogensen	21–19, 21–11	(gold) Winner	
2017	Hong Kong Open	(Indonesia) Kevin Sanjaya Sukamuljo	(Denmark) Mads Conrad-Petersen (Denmark) Mads Pieler Kolding	21–12, 21–18	(gold) Winner	
2017	Dubai World Superseries Finals	(Indonesia) Kevin Sanjaya Sukamuljo	(China) Liu Cheng (China) Zhang Nan	21–16, 21–15	(gold) Winner	

BWF Super Series Finals tournament
BWF Super Series Premier tournament
BWF Super Series tournament

=== BWF Grand Prix (3 titles, 1 runner-up) ===
The BWF Grand Prix had two levels, the Grand Prix and Grand Prix Gold. It was a series of badminton tournaments sanctioned by the Badminton World Federation (BWF) and played between 2007 and 2017.

Men's doubles
Year	Tournament	Partner	Opponent	Score	Result	Ref.
2014	Indonesian Masters	(Indonesia) Markis Kido	(Indonesia) Selvanus Geh (Indonesia) Kevin Sanjaya Sukamuljo	21–17, 20–22, 21–14	(gold) Winner	
2015	Chinese Taipei Open	(Indonesia) Kevin Sanjaya Sukamuljo	(China) Fu Haifeng (China) Zhang Nan	13–21, 8–21	(silver) Runner-up	
2015	Chinese Taipei Masters	(Indonesia) Kevin Sanjaya Sukamuljo	(Malaysia) Hoon Thien How (Malaysia) Lim Khim Wah	21–12, 21–8	(gold) Winner	
2016	Malaysia Masters	(Indonesia) Kevin Sanjaya Sukamuljo	(Malaysia) Koo Kien Keat (Malaysia) Tan Boon Heong	18–21, 21–13, 21–18	(gold) Winner	

BWF Grand Prix Gold tournament
BWF Grand Prix tournament

=== BWF International Challenge/Series (3 titles, 3 runners-up) ===
Men's singles
Year	Tournament	Opponent	Score	Result	Ref.
2009	Victorian International	(New Zealand) Joe Wu	17–21, 21–8, 21–15	(gold) Winner	

Men's doubles
Year	Tournament	Partner	Opponent	Score	Result	Ref.
2011	Singapore International	(Indonesia) Agripina Prima Rahmanto Putra	(Indonesia) Lukhi Apri Nugroho (Indonesia) Kevin Sanjaya Sukamuljo	21–17, 21–9	(gold) Winner	
2012	Iran Fajr International	(Indonesia) Agripina Prima Rahmanto Putra	(India) Tarun Kona (India) Arun Vishnu	21–18, 21–18	(gold) Winner	
2012	Vietnam International	(Indonesia) Agripina Prima Rahmanto Putra	(Indonesia) Ricky Karanda Suwardi (Indonesia) Muhammad Ulinnuha	12–21, 19–21	(silver) Runner-up	
2012	Osaka International	(Indonesia) Agripina Prima Rahmanto Putra	(Japan) Takeshi Kamura (Japan) Keigo Sonoda	17–21, 23–21, 18–21	(silver) Runner-up	

Mixed doubles
Year	Tournament	Partner	Opponent	Score	Result	Ref.
2014	Turkey International	(Bulgaria) Gabriela Stoeva	(Germany) Jones Ralfy Jansen (Germany) Cisita Joity Jansen	21–17, 17–21, 12–21	(silver) Runner-up	

BWF International Challenge tournament
BWF International Series tournament
BWF Future Series tournament

=== BWF Junior International (1 runner-up) ===
Boys' doubles
Year	Tournament	Partner	Opponent	Score	Result	Ref.
2007	Cheers Youth International	(Indonesia) Nandang Arif Saputra	(Singapore) Riky Widianto (Singapore) Chayut Triyachart	8–21, 18–21	(silver) Runner-up	

BWF Junior International Grand Prix tournament
BWF Junior International Challenge tournament
BWF Junior International Series tournament
BWF Junior Future Series tournament

== Performance timeline ==
Key

W	Won	F	Finalist	SF	Semi-finalist
QF	Quarter-finalist	#R	Rounds 4, 3, 2, 1	RR	Round-robin stage
Q#	Qualification round	A	Absent	w/d	Withdrew
G	Gold	S	Silver	B	Bronze
NH	Not held	N/A	Not applicable	DNQ	Did not qualify

=== National team ===
- Senior level

Team events	2015	2016	2017	2018	2019	2020	2021	2022	2023	Ref
SEA Games	G	NH	A	NH	A	NH	A	NH	A	
Asia Team Championships	NH	A	NH	G	NH	G	NH	A	NH	
Asian Games	NH			S	NH				NH	
Thomas Cup	NH	S	NH	B	NH	G	NH	A	NH	
Sudirman Cup	B	NH	RR	NH	B	NH	QF	NH	QF	

=== Individual competitions ===
==== Senior level ====
===== Men's doubles =====
Events	2014	2015	2016	2017	2018	2019	2020	2021	2022	2023	Ref
SEA Games	NH	S	NH	A	NH	A	NH	A	NH	A	
Asian Championships	A		QF	w/d	A	S	NH		A		
Asian Games	A	NH			G	NH				NH	
World Championships	3R	A	NH	QF	QF	2R	NH	w/d	3R	DNQ	
Olympic Games	NH		DNQ	NH			QF	NH			

Tournament	BWF Superseries / Grand Prix								BWF World Tour						Best	Ref
Tournament	2010	2011	2012	2013	2014	2015	2016	2017	2018	2019	2020	2021	2022	2023	Best	Ref
Malaysia Open	A				QF	1R	2R	W	QF	QF	NH		w/d	2R	W ('17)	
India Open	A				1R	A	W	W	W	A	NH		A	QF	W ('16, '17, '18)	
Indonesia Masters	2R	QF	QF	SF	W	QF	A	NH	W	W	W	F	SF	2R	W ('14, '18, '19, '20)	
Thailand Masters	NH						2R	A				NH		A	2R ('16)	
All England Open	A				SF	QF	1R	W	W	1R	F	2R	SF	A	W ('17, '18)	
Swiss Open	A				QF	SF	A				NH	A			SF ('15)	
Malaysia Masters	A		2R	QF	SF	A	W	A		W	QF	NH	w/d	2R	W ('16, '19)	
Thailand Open	NH	2R	1R	A	NH	SF	A			QF	w/d	NH	A	SF	SF ('15, '23)	
Thailand Open	NH	2R	1R	A	NH	SF	A			QF	w/d	NH	A	SF	SF ('15, '23)	
Singapore Open	A			1R	1R	2R	QF	SF	A	SF	NH		w/d	2R	SF ('17, '19)	
Indonesia Open	A		2R	2R	QF	2R	2R	1R	W	W	NH	W	2R	A	W ('18, '19, '21)	
Chinese Taipei Open	A	2R	1R	A	1R	F	A				NH		A		F ('15)	
Korea Open	A					1R	A	F	A	QF	NH		w/d	A	F ('17)	
Japan Open	A			1R	A	1R	A	W	W	W	NH		2R	A	W ('17, '18, '19)	
Australian Open	A			1R	2R	A	W	w/d	A		NH		A		W ('16)	
China Open	A			2R	A		W	W	SF	W	NH			A	W ('16, '17, '19)	
Hong Kong Open	A			QF	2R	QF	1R	W	W	QF	NH			A	W ('17, '18)	
Vietnam Open	A		QF	A		SF	A				NH		A		SF ('15)	
Denmark Open	A			2R	QF	A	QF	F	W	W	A	2R	F	A	W ('18, '19)	
French Open	A			W	QF	A	2R	w/d	F	W	NH	F	1R	A	W ('13, '19)	
Hylo Open	A											W	A		W ('21)	
Korea Masters	A	1R	A			2R	A				NH		A		2R ('15)	
China Masters	A			QF	A	1R	A		W	W	NH			A	W ('18, '19)	
Syed Modi International	A	2R	SF	NH	w/d	A	2R	A			NH		A	1R	SF ('12)	
Guwahati Masters	NH													QF	QF ('23)	
Superseries / World Tour Finals	DNQ						RR	W	RR	SF	DNQ	F	DNQ		W ('17)	
Chinese Taipei Masters	NH					W	A	NH							W ('15)	
Macau Open	A	1R	QF	A		2R	A				NH				QF ('12)	
New Zealand Open	NH	N/A	NH	2R	A		SF	A			NH				SF ('16)	
Year-end ranking	120	55	26	24	10	16	2	1	1	1	1	1	23	39	1	
Tournament	2010	2011	2012	2013	2014	2015	2016	2017	2018	2019	2020	2021	2022	2023	Best	Ref

===== Mixed doubles =====
Events	2014	Ref
World Championships	1R	

Tournament	BWF Superseries / Grand Prix		Best	Ref
Tournament	2013	2014	Best	Ref
Swiss Open	A	1R	1R ('14)	
Malaysia Masters	SF	A	SF ('13)	
New Zealand Open	2R	A	2R ('13)	
Australian Open	2R	1R	2R ('13)	
India Open	A	1R	1R ('14)	
Malaysia Open	A	1R	1R ('14)	
Singapore Open	1R	2R	2R ('14)	
China Open	2R	A	2R ('13)	
Japan Open	2R	A	2R ('13)	
Denmark Open	1R	A	1R ('13)	
French Open	A	1R	1R ('14)	
China Masters	1R	A	1R ('13)	
Hong Kong Open	1R	A	1R ('13)	
Indonesia Masters	QF	A	QF ('13)	
Indonesia Open	1R	1R	1R ('13, '14)	
Year-end ranking	53	59	34	
Tournament	2013	2014	Best	Ref

== Record against selected opponents ==
Record against year-end Finals finalists, World Championships semi-finalists, and Olympic quarter-finalists.

=== Kevin Sanjaya Sukamuljo ===
Marcus Fernaldi Gideon and Kevin Sanjaya Sukamuljo have an eleven-match winning streak in the head-to-head record against Satwiksairaj Rankireddy and Chirag Shetty of India. They also lead the meeting record with a wide margin against Li Junhui and Liu Yuchen of China and their senior compatriots Mohammad Ahsan and Hendra Setiawan. Meanwhile, Sukamuljo and Gideon have a poor head-to-head record against Liang Weikeng and Wang Chang (0–4), Hiroyuki Endo and Yuta Watanabe (2–6), Lee Yong-dae and Yoo Yeon-seong (0–3), and also Fu Haifeng and Zhang Nan (1–3).

Players	M	W	L	Diff.
(China) Chai Biao & Hong Wei	5	3	2	+1
(China) Fu Haifeng & Zhang Nan	4	1	3	–2
(China) He Jiting & Tan Qiang	8	7	1	+6
(China) Li Junhui & Liu Yuchen	13	11	2	+9
(China) Liang Weikeng & Wang Chang	4	0	4	–4
(China) Liu Cheng & Zhang Nan	7	5	2	+3
(China) Liu Xiaolong & Qiu Zihan	1	1	0	+1
(China) Liu Yuchen & Ou Xuanyi	1	0	1	–1
(Chinese Taipei) Chen Hung-ling & Wang Chi-lin	5	5	0	+5
(Chinese Taipei) Lee Yang & Wang Chi-lin	6	5	1	+4
(Denmark) Kim Astrup & Anders Skaarup Rasmussen	9	8	1	+7
(Denmark) Mathias Boe & Carsten Mogensen	9	5	4	+1
(England) Marcus Ellis & Chris Langridge	5	5	0	+5
(India) Satwiksairaj Rankireddy & Chirag Shetty	11	11	0	+11
(Indonesia) Mohammad Ahsan & Hendra Setiawan	13	11	2	+9
(Indonesia) Fajar Alfian & Muhammad Rian Ardianto	10	6	4	+2

Players	M	W	L	Diff.
(Japan) Hiroyuki Endo & Kenichi Hayakawa	1	0	1	–1
(Japan) Hiroyuki Endo & Yuta Watanabe	8	2	6	–4
(Japan) Takuro Hoki & Yugo Kobayashi	15	11	4	+7
(Japan) Takeshi Kamura & Keigo Sonoda	16	11	5	+6
(Malaysia) Aaron Chia & Soh Wooi Yik	11	9	2	+7
(Malaysia) Goh Sze Fei & Nur Izzuddin	2	2	0	+2
(Malaysia) Goh V Shem & Tan Wee Kiong	8	7	1	+6
(Malaysia) Koo Kien Keat & Tan Boon Heong	3	3	0	+3
(Malaysia) Ong Yew Sin & Teo Ee Yi	7	7	0	+7
(Russia) Vladimir Ivanov & Ivan Sozonov	7	7	0	+7
(South Korea) Kang Min-hyuk & Seo Seung-jae	3	2	1	+1
(South Korea) Kim Gi-jung & Kim Sa-rang	2	1	1	0
(South Korea) Ko Sung-hyun & Shin Baek-cheol	4	2	2	0
(South Korea) Lee Yong-dae & Yoo Yeon-seong	3	0	3	–3
(Thailand) Supak Jomkoh & Kittinupong Kedren	3	3	0	+3

=== Markis Kido ===
Players	M	W	L	Diff.
(China) Chai Biao & Hong Wei	2	0	2	–2
(China) Fu Haifeng & Zhang Nan	1	1	0	+1
(China) Li Junhui & Liu Yuchen	1	1	0	+1
(China) Liu Xiaolong & Qiu Zihan	3	1	2	–1
(Chinese Taipei) Chen Hung-ling & Wang Chi-lin	1	0	1	–1
(Denmark) Mathias Boe & Carsten Mogensen	2	1	1	0
(Indonesia) Mohammad Ahsan & Hendra Setiawan	3	0	3	–3
(Indonesia) Fajar Alfian & Muhammad Rian Ardianto	1	1	0	+1

Players	M	W	L	Diff.
(Japan) Hiroyuki Endo & Kenichi Hayakawa	1	1	0	+1
(Japan) Takeshi Kamura & Keigo Sonoda	2	2	0	+2
(Malaysia) Goh V Shem & Tan Wee Kiong	1	0	1	–1
(Malaysia) Koo Kien Keat & Tan Boon Heong	1	1	0	+1
(Russia) Vladimir Ivanov & Ivan Sozonov	1	0	1	–1
(South Korea) Ko Sung-hyun & Shin Baek-cheol	3	2	1	+1
(South Korea) Lee Yong-dae & Yoo Yeon-seong	1	0	1	–1

== Filmography ==
=== Web shows ===
Year	Title	Role	Notes	Ref.
2025	Physical: Asia	Contestant	Team Indonesia	
