= 2019 Indonesia Masters =

Badminton tournament in Jakarta

Tournament details
- Dates: 22–27 January
- Edition: 9th
- Level: Super 500
- Total prize money: US$350,000
- Venue: Istora Gelora Bung Karno
- Location: Jakarta, Indonesia

Champions
- Men's singles: (Denmark) Anders Antonsen
- Women's singles: (India) Saina Nehwal
- Men's doubles: (Indonesia) Marcus Fernaldi Gideon (Indonesia) Kevin Sanjaya Sukamuljo
- Women's doubles: (Japan) Misaki Matsutomo (Japan) Ayaka Takahashi
- Mixed doubles: (China) Zheng Siwei (China) Huang Yaqiong

The 2019 Indonesia Masters (officially known as the Daihatsu Indonesia Masters 2019 for sponsorship reasons) was a badminton tournament that took place at the Istora Gelora Bung Karno in Indonesia from 22 to 27 January 2019 and had a total purse of $350,000.

== Tournament ==
The 2019 Indonesia Masters was the third tournament of the 2019 BWF World Tour and also part of the Indonesia Masters championships, which had been held since 2010. This tournament was organized by the Badminton Association of Indonesia with sanction from the BWF.

=== Venue ===
This international tournament was held at the Istora Gelora Bung Karno in Jakarta, Indonesia.

=== Point distribution ===
Below is the point distribution table for each phase of the tournament based on the BWF points system for the BWF World Tour Super 500 event.

Winner	Runner-up	3/4	5/8	9/16	17/32	33/64	65/128
9,200	7,800	6,420	5,040	3,600	2,220	880	430

=== Prize money ===
The total prize money for this tournament was US$350,000. Distribution of prize money was in accordance with BWF regulations.

Event	Winner	Finals	Semi-finals	Quarter-finals	Last 16
Singles	$26,250	$13,300	$5,075	$2,100	$1,225
Doubles	$27,650	$13,300	$4,900	$2,537.50	$1,312.50

== Men's singles ==
=== Seeds ===
1. (Japan) Kento Momota (final)
2. (China) Shi Yuqi (second round)
3. (Chinese Taipei) Chou Tien-chen (first round)
4. (China) Chen Long (quarter-finals)
5. (South Korea) Son Wan-ho (first round)
6. (Denmark) Viktor Axelsen (semi-finals)
7. (Indonesia) Anthony Sinisuka Ginting (quarter-finals)
8. (India) Srikanth Kidambi (quarter-finals)

=== Finals ===
Semi-finals
1	(Japan) Kento Momota	21	21
6	(Denmark) Viktor Axelsen	15	4
(Denmark) Anders Antonsen	21	21
(Indonesia) Jonatan Christie	18	16

Final
1	(Japan) Kento Momota	16	21	16
(Denmark) Anders Antonsen	21	14	21

=== Top half ===
==== Section 1 ====
First Round
1	(Japan) K Momota	22	21
(Denmark) J Ø. Jørgensen	20	11
(Denmark) H-K Vittinghus	21	18	21
(Thailand) K Phetpradab	12	21	16
7	(Indonesia) A S Ginting	21	21
PFQ	(India) Parupalli K	12	16
PFQ	(China) Zhao JP	21	15	21
(China) Lin D	17	21	9

Second Round
1	(Japan) K Momota	21	22
(Denmark) H-K Vittinghus	18	20
7	(Indonesia) A S Ginting	21	21
PFQ	(China) Zhao JP	15	12

Quarter-finals
1	(Japan) K Momota	21	21
7	(Indonesia) A S Ginting	9	10

==== Section 2 ====
First Round
4	(China) Chen L	21	21
(India) B. S Praneeth	12	16
(Thailand) K Wangcharoen	21	20	21
(Thailand) S Avihingsanon	15	22	15
6	(Denmark) V Axelsen	21	19	21
Q4	(India) S Dey	14	21	15
Q2	(Thailand) T Saensomboonsuk	13	15
(Japan) K Tsuneyama	21	21

Second Round
4	(China) Chen L	21	21
(Thailand) K Wangcharoen	19	10
6	(Denmark) V Axelsen	21	21
(Japan) K Tsuneyama	11	9

Quarter-finals
4	(China) Chen L	18	14
6	(Denmark) V Axelsen	21	21

=== Bottom half ===
==== Section 3 ====
First Round
Q3	(Indonesia) S D Kuncoro	22	15	8
Q1	(Indonesia) S H Rhustavito	20	21	21
(Denmark) A Antonsen	21	6	21
5	(South Korea) Son W-h	17	21	15
PFQ	(Thailand) S Thammasin	21	21
(Japan) K Sakai	11	19
PFQ	(Malaysia) Lee Z J	21	21
3	(Chinese Taipei) Chou T-c	13	13

Second Round
Q1	(Indonesia) S H Rhustavito	11	9
(Denmark) A Antonsen	21	21
PFQ	(Thailand) S Thammasin	13	13
PFQ	(Malaysia) Lee Z J	21	21

Quarter-finals
(Denmark) A Antonsen	21	21
PFQ	(Malaysia) Lee Z J	13	13

==== Section 4 ====
First Round
(Hong Kong) Ng K L	21	20	17
(Japan) K Nishimoto	19	22	21
PFQ	(Malaysia) Chong W F	12	8
8	(India) S Kidambi	21	21
(Denmark) R Gemke	16	0^{r}
(Indonesia) J Christie	21	0
(China) Lu GZ	13	15
2	(China) Shi YQ	21	21

Second Round
(Japan) K Nishimoto	14	9
8	(India) S Kidambi	21	21
(Indonesia) J Christie	22	21
2	(China) Shi YQ	20	6

Quarter-finals
8	(India) S Kidambi	18	19
(Indonesia) J Christie	21	21

== Women's singles ==
=== Seeds ===
1. (Japan) Nozomi Okuhara (first round)
2. (India) P. V. Sindhu (quarter-finals)
3. (China) Chen Yufei (semi-finals)
4. (Japan) Akane Yamaguchi (second round)
5. (Spain) Carolina Marín (final)
6. (China) He Bingjiao (semi-finals)
7. (Thailand) Ratchanok Intanon (quarter-finals)
8. (India) Saina Nehwal (champion)

=== Finals ===
Semi-finals
6	(China) He Bingjiao	21	12	18
8	(India) Saina Nehwal	18	21	21
3	(China) Chen Yufei	21	11	21
5	(Spain) Carolina Marín	17	21	23

Final
8	(India) Saina Nehwal	4
5	(Spain) Carolina Marín	10^{r}

=== Top half ===
==== Section 1 ====
First Round
1	(Japan) N Okuhara	18	17
(China) Chen XX	21	21
(Chinese Taipei) Pai Y-p	12	11
Q3	(Indonesia) R Hartawan	21	21
6	(China) He BJ	16	23	22
(Malaysia) Goh J W	21	21	20
(Russia) E Kosetskaya	19	9
(Thailand) N Jindapol	21	21

Second Round
(China) Chen XX	17	21	21
Q3	(Indonesia) R Hartawan	21	15	13
6	(China) He BJ	21	21
(Thailand) N Jindapol	17	18

Quarter-finals
(China) Chen XX	18	14
6	(China) He BJ	21	21

==== Section 2 ====
First Round
4	(Japan) A Yamaguchi	21	15	21
(China) Han Y	16	21	16
Q1	(England) C Birch	21	8	9
(Thailand) P Chochuwong	17	21	21
8	(India) S Nehwal	7	21	21
Q2	(Indonesia) D D Ayustine	21	16	11
(Indonesia) Fitriani	21	21
(Denmark) L Kjærsfeldt	16	14

Second Round
4	(Japan) A Yamaguchi	18	12
(Thailand) P Chochuwong	21	21
8	(India) S Nehwal	21	21
(Indonesia) Fitriani	17	15

Quarter-finals
(Thailand) P Chochuwong	7	18
8	(India) S Nehwal	21	21

=== Bottom half ===
==== Section 3 ====
First Round
(Thailand) B Ongbamrungphan	21	21
(China) Cai YY	13	14
(Malaysia) S Cheah S Y	15	14
7	(Thailand) R Intanon	21	21
PFQ	(Indonesia) L A Mainaky	20	14
(Japan) S Takahashi	22	21
Q4	(Indonesia) Y Y Susanto	21	15	8
3	(China) Chen YF	15	21	21

Second Round
(Thailand) B Ongbamrungphan	16	13
7	(Thailand) R Intanon	21	21
(Japan) S Takahashi	11	11
3	(China) Chen YF	21	21

Quarter-finals
7	(Thailand) R Intanon	21	9	15
3	(China) Chen YF	14	21	21

==== Section 4 ====
First Round
PFQ	(South Korea) Kim G-e	21	15	21
(South Korea) Sung J-h	14	21	19
PFQ	(China) Zhang YM	14	8
5	(Spain) C Marín	21	21
(Indonesia) G M Tunjung	18	21	21
(Japan) A Ohori	21	18	18
(China) Li XR	24	8	17
2	(India) P. V. Sindhu	22	21	21

Second Round
PFQ	(South Korea) Kim G-e	21	12	18
5	(Spain) C Marín	18	21	21
(Indonesia) G M Tunjung	21	7
2	(India) P. V. Sindhu	23	21

Quarter-finals
5	(Spain) C Marín	21	21
2	(India) P. V. Sindhu	11	12

== Men's doubles ==
=== Seeds ===
1. (Indonesia) Marcus Fernaldi Gideon / Kevin Sanjaya Sukamuljo (champions)
2. (China) Li Junhui / Liu Yuchen (quarter-finals)
3. (Japan) Takeshi Kamura / Keigo Sonoda (quarter-finals)
4. (Japan) Hiroyuki Endo / Yuta Watanabe (quarter-finals)
5. (Denmark) Kim Astrup / Anders Skaarup Rasmussen (semi-finals)
6. (Indonesia) Fajar Alfian / Muhammad Rian Ardianto (quarter-finals)
7. (China) Han Chengkai / Zhou Haodong (semi-finals)
8. (Indonesia) Mohammad Ahsan / Hendra Setiawan (final)

=== Finals ===
Semi-finals
1	(Indonesia) Marcus Fernaldi Gideon (Indonesia) Kevin Sanjaya Sukamuljo	21	21
5	(Denmark) Kim Astrup (Denmark) Anders Skaarup Rasmussen	19	13
7	(China) Han Chengkai (China) Zhou Haodong	11	17
8	(Indonesia) Mohammad Ahsan (Indonesia) Hendra Setiawan	21	21

Final
1	(Indonesia) Marcus Fernaldi Gideon (Indonesia) Kevin Sanjaya Sukamuljo	21	21
8	(Indonesia) Mohammad Ahsan (Indonesia) Hendra Setiawan	17	11

=== Top half ===
==== Section 1 ====
First Round
1	(Indonesia) M F Gideon (Indonesia) K S Sukamuljo	21	19	21
(Germany) M Lamsfuß (Germany) M E Seidel	14	21	15
(Indonesia) W Nayaka (Indonesia) A Yusuf	21	16	21
(Russia) V Ivanov (Russia) I Sozonov	17	21	19
6	(Indonesia) F Alfian (Indonesia) M R Ardianto	21	21
Q4	(Chinese Taipei) Lee J-h (Chinese Taipei) Yang P-h	10	13
Q1	(Thailand) I Apisuk (Thailand) T Viriyangkura	9	12
(Indonesia) B Angriawan (Indonesia) Hardianto	21	21

Second Round
1	(Indonesia) M F Gideon (Indonesia) K S Sukamuljo	21	21
(Indonesia) W Nayaka (Indonesia) A Yusuf	14	16
6	(Indonesia) F Alfian (Indonesia) M R Ardianto	21	21
(Indonesia) B Angriawan (Indonesia) Hardianto	18	19

Quarter-finals
1	(Indonesia) M F Gideon (Indonesia) K S Sukamuljo	18	21	21
6	(Indonesia) F Alfian (Indonesia) M R Ardianto	21	17	19

==== Section 2 ====
First Round
3	(Japan) T Kamura (Japan) K Sonoda	21	21
(Malaysia) Goh V S (Malaysia) Tan W K	12	16
(Japan) T Hoki (Japan) Y Kobayashi	16	18
(South Korea) Choi S-g (South Korea) Seo S-j	21	21
5	(Denmark) K Astrup (Denmark) A S Rasmussen	21	21
(Japan) T Inoue (Japan) Y Kaneko	11	15
PFQ	(Denmark) M P Kolding (Denmark) N Nøhr	21	19	15
(India) M Attri (India) B. S Reddy	14	21	21

Second Round
3	(Japan) T Kamura (Japan) K Sonoda	21	21
(South Korea) Choi S-g (South Korea) Seo S-j	19	14
5	(Denmark) K Astrup (Denmark) A S Rasmussen	21	17	21
(India) M Attri (India) B. S Reddy	14	21	10

Quarter-finals
3	(Japan) T Kamura (Japan) K Sonoda	21	17	18
5	(Denmark) K Astrup (Denmark) A S Rasmussen	9	21	21

=== Bottom half ===
==== Section 3 ====
First Round
(South Korea) Kim G-j (South Korea) Lee Y-d	21	21
(Denmark) M Boe (Denmark) C Mogensen	16	13
PFQ	(Thailand) B Isara (Thailand) M Jongjit	19	19
7	(China) Han CK (China) Zhou HD	21	21
Q2	(Thailand) K Kedren (Thailand) D Puavaranukroh	18	21	21
(Chinese Taipei) Liao M-c (Chinese Taipei) Su C-h	21	19	11
(Chinese Taipei) Lu C-y (Chinese Taipei) Yang P-h	18	6
4	(Japan) H Endo (Japan) Y Watanabe	21	21

Second Round
(South Korea) Kim G-j (South Korea) Lee Y-d	21	14	10
7	(China) Han CK (China) Zhou HD	19	21	21
Q2	(Thailand) K Kedren (Thailand) D Puavaranukroh	16	15
4	(Japan) H Endo (Japan) Y Watanabe	21	21

Quarter-finals
7	(China) Han CK (China) Zhou HD	23	21
4	(Japan) H Endo (Japan) Y Watanabe	21	19

==== Section 4 ====
First Round
Q3	(China) Huang KX (China) Wang ZK	16	19
(China) Ou XY (China) Ren XY	21	21
(Malaysia) A Chia (Malaysia) Soh W Y	13	13
8	(Indonesia) M Ahsan (Indonesia) H Setiawan	21	21
(China) He JT (China) Tan Q	17	8
(Malaysia) Ong Y S (Malaysia) Teo E Y	21	21
(South Korea) Ko S-h (South Korea) Shin B-c	16	15
2	(China) Li JH (China) Liu YC	21	21

Second Round
(China) Ou XY (China) Ren XY	16	15
8	(Indonesia) M Ahsan (Indonesia) H Setiawan	21	21
(Malaysia) Ong Y S (Malaysia) Teo E Y	13	18
2	(China) Li JH (China) Liu YC	21	21

Quarter-finals
8	(Indonesia) M Ahsan (Indonesia) H Setiawan	21	21
2	(China) Li JH (China) Liu YC	16	12

== Women's doubles ==
=== Seeds ===
1. (Japan) Yuki Fukushima / Sayaka Hirota (first round)
2. (Japan) Misaki Matsutomo / Ayaka Takahashi (champions)
3. (Japan) Mayu Matsumoto / Wakana Nagahara (semi-finals)
4. (Indonesia) Greysia Polii / Apriyani Rahayu (semi-finals)
5. (China) Chen Qingchen / Jia Yifan (quarter-finals)
6. (South Korea) Lee So-hee / Shin Seung-chan (withdrew)
7. (Japan) Shiho Tanaka / Koharu Yonemoto (second round)
8. (Thailand) Jongkolphan Kititharakul / Rawinda Prajongjai (quarter-finals)

=== Finals ===
Semi-finals
(South Korea) Kim So-yeong (South Korea) Kong Hee-yong	13	22	21
3	(Japan) Mayu Matsumoto (Japan) Wakana Nagahara	21	20	16
4	(Indonesia) Greysia Polii (Indonesia) Apriyani Rahayu	20	22	12
2	(Japan) Misaki Matsutomo (Japan) Ayaka Takahashi	22	20	21

Final
(South Korea) Kim So-yeong (South Korea) Kong Hee-yong	19	15
2	(Japan) Misaki Matsutomo (Japan) Ayaka Takahashi	21	21

=== Top half ===
==== Section 1 ====
First Round
1	(Japan) Y Fukushima (Japan) S Hirota	19	9
(South Korea) Chang Y-n (South Korea) Jung K-e	21	21
PFQ	(Indonesia) T O Kusumah (Indonesia) V A Sukoco	21	19	14
Q4	(Indonesia) D B Anjani (Indonesia) D D Cahyaning	11	21	21
7	(Japan) S Tanaka (Japan) K Yonemoto	21	21
(Indonesia) D D Haris (Indonesia) V Putri	15	14
Q3	(Indonesia) D Fitriani (Indonesia) N Melati	12	14
(South Korea) Kim S-y (South Korea) Kong H-y	21	21

Second Round
(South Korea) Chang Y-n (South Korea) Jung K-e	21	21
Q4	(Indonesia) D B Anjani (Indonesia) D D Cahyaning	10	7
7	(Japan) S Tanaka (Japan) K Yonemoto	17	17
(South Korea) Kim S-y (South Korea) Kong H-y	21	21

Quarter-finals
(South Korea) Chang Y-n (South Korea) Jung K-e	17	19
(South Korea) Kim S-y (South Korea) Kong H-y	21	21

==== Section 2 ====
First Round
3	(Japan) M Matsumoto (Japan) W Nagahara	21	21
(Germany) J Goliszewski (Germany) L Käpplein	14	12
(Indonesia) N K M Istirani (Indonesia) R A Pradipta	16	15
Q2	(China) Liu XX (China) Xia YT	21	21
5	(China) Chen QC (China) Jia YF	21	21
PFQ	(Indonesia) F D Kusuma (Indonesia) R Sugiarto	12	10
(Thailand) C Chaladchalam (Thailand) P Muenwong	17	11
(Chinese Taipei) Pai Y-p (Chinese Taipei) Wu T-j	21	21

Second Round
3	(Japan) M Matsumoto (Japan) W Nagahara	21	21
Q2	(China) Liu XX (China) Xia YT	11	11
5	(China) Chen QC (China) Jia YF	21	21
(Chinese Taipei) Pai Y-p (Chinese Taipei) Wu T-j	11	11

Quarter-finals
3	(Japan) M Matsumoto (Japan) W Nagahara	18	21	21
5	(China) Chen QC (China) Jia YF	21	14	8

=== Bottom half ===
==== Section 3 ====
First Round
(Malaysia) Chow M K (Malaysia) Lee M Y	21	21
(Russia) E Bolotova (Russia) A Davletova	15	17
(India) A Ponnappa (India) N. S Reddy	14	14
8	(Thailand) J Kititharakul (Thailand) R Prajongjai	21	21
Q1	(Chinese Taipei) Hsu Y-c (Chinese Taipei) Hu L-f	21	21
(Indonesia) Y Barkah (Indonesia) J F Sugiarto	18	15
(Bulgaria) G Stoeva (Bulgaria) S Stoeva	20	15
4	(Indonesia) G Polii (Indonesia) A Rahayu	22	21

Second Round
(Malaysia) Chow M K (Malaysia) Lee M Y	21	21	14
8	(Thailand) J Kititharakul (Thailand) R Prajongjai	19	23	21
Q1	(Chinese Taipei) Hsu Y-c (Chinese Taipei) Hu L-f	9	18
4	(Indonesia) G Polii (Indonesia) A Rahayu	21	21

Quarter-finals
8	(Thailand) J Kititharakul (Thailand) R Prajongjai	16	21	13
4	(Indonesia) G Polii (Indonesia) A Rahayu	21	17	21

==== Section 4 ====
First Round
(Japan) A Sakuramoto (Japan) Y Takahata	20	13
(China) Du Y (China) Li YH	22	21
(China) Chen L (China) Xu Y	19	17
PFQ	(England) C Birch (England) L Smith	21	21
(Malaysia) V Hoo K M (Malaysia) Yap C W	21	21
(Indonesia) A Imanuela (Indonesia) S F S Ramadhanti	13	14
(Thailand) P Supajirakul (Thailand) S Taerattanachai	10	8
2	(Japan) M Matsutomo (Japan) A Takahashi	21	21

Second Round
(China) Du Y (China) Li YH	21	21
PFQ	(England) C Birch (England) L Smith	14	19
(Malaysia) V Hoo K M (Malaysia) Yap C W	14	13
2	(Japan) M Matsutomo (Japan) A Takahashi	21	21

Quarter-finals
(China) Du Y (China) Li YH	13	15
2	(Japan) M Matsutomo (Japan) A Takahashi	21	21

== Mixed doubles ==
=== Seeds ===
1. (China) Zheng Siwei / Huang Yaqiong (champions)
2. (China) Wang Yilyu / Huang Dongping (withdrew)
3. (Japan) Yuta Watanabe / Arisa Higashino (semi-finals)
4. (Indonesia) Tontowi Ahmad / Liliyana Natsir (final)
5. (Thailand) Dechapol Puavaranukroh / Sapsiree Taerattanachai (second round)
6. (Malaysia) Chan Peng Soon / Goh Liu Ying (semi-finals)
7. (England) Chris Adcock / Gabby Adcock (second round)
8. (China) Zhang Nan / Li Yinhui (withdrew)

=== Finals ===
Semi-finals
1	(China) Zheng Siwei (China) Huang Yaqiong	11	21	21
3	(Japan) Yuta Watanabe (Japan) Arisa Higashino	21	14	11
4	(Indonesia) Tontowi Ahmad (Indonesia) Liliyana Natsir	22	21
6	(Malaysia) Chan Peng Soon (Malaysia) Goh Liu Ying	20	11

Final
1	(China) Zheng Siwei (China) Huang Yaqiong	19	21	21
4	(Indonesia) Tontowi Ahmad (Indonesia) Liliyana Natsir	21	19	16

=== Top half ===
==== Section 1 ====
First Round
1	(China) Zheng SW (China) Huang YQ	21	16	21
(China) Ou XY (China) Liu XX	13	21	10
(Indonesia) P Jordan (Indonesia) M D Oktavianti	21	21	23
(China) He JT (China) Du Y	19	23	21
7	(England) C Adcock (England) G Adcock	21	21
PFQ	(Japan) Y Kaneko (Japan) M Matsutomo	12	18
(Germany) M E Seidel (Germany) L Efler	21	19	12
(Malaysia) Goh S H (Malaysia) S J Lai	18	21	21

Second Round
1	(China) Zheng SW (China) Huang YQ	21	21
(Indonesia) P Jordan (Indonesia) M D Oktavianti	16	12
7	(England) C Adcock (England) G Adcock	19	23	7
(Malaysia) Goh S H (Malaysia) S J Lai	21	21	21

Quarter-finals
1	(China) Zheng SW (China) Huang YQ	21	22
(Malaysia) Goh S H (Malaysia) S J Lai	13	20

==== Section 2 ====
First Round
3	(Japan) Y Watanabe (Japan) A Higashino	21	21
Q1	(Chinese Taipei) Lu C-y (Chinese Taipei) Lee C-h	16	17
(Germany) M Lamsfuß (Germany) I Herttrich	21	21
(Indonesia) R Alexander (Indonesia) D Susanto	15	13
5	(Thailand) D Puavaranukroh (Thailand) S Taerattanachai	21	21
Q2	(Indonesia) R N Kusharjanto (Indonesia) S F S Ramadhanti	18	17
(Thailand) N Phuangphuapet (Thailand) S Amitrapai	16	14
(China) Lu K (China) Chen L	21	21

Second Round
3	(Japan) Y Watanabe (Japan) A Higashino	21	21
(Germany) M Lamsfuß (Germany) I Herttrich	14	19
5	(Thailand) D Puavaranukroh (Thailand) S Taerattanachai	23	15	18
(China) Lu K (China) Chen L	21	21	21

Quarter-finals
3	(Japan) Y Watanabe (Japan) A Higashino	21	21
(China) Lu K (China) Chen L	15	17

=== Bottom half ===
==== Section 3 ====
First Round
(Indonesia) R Rivaldy (Indonesia) P H Mentari	14	21	21
(Russia) E Dremin (Russia) E Dimova	21	11	12
(Japan) T Hoki (Japan) W Nagahara	21	21
PFQ	(Japan) K Gondo (Japan) A Kurihara	15	10
(Malaysia) Tan K M (Malaysia) Lai P J	12	21	18
(Indonesia) H Faizal (Indonesia) G E Widjaja	21	13	21
(India) P Chopra (India) N. S Reddy	15	15
4	(Indonesia) T Ahmad (Indonesia) L Natsir	21	21

Second Round
(Indonesia) R Rivaldy (Indonesia) P H Mentari	16	21	13
(Japan) T Hoki (Japan) W Nagahara	21	19	21
(Indonesia) H Faizal (Indonesia) G E Widjaja	16	12
4	(Indonesia) T Ahmad (Indonesia) L Natsir	21	21

Quarter-finals
(Japan) T Hoki (Japan) W Nagahara	16	14
4	(Indonesia) T Ahmad (Indonesia) L Natsir	21	21

==== Section 4 ====
First Round
(England) B Lane (England) J Pugh	21	18	21
Q4	(Chinese Taipei) Lin C-y (Chinese Taipei) Hsu Y-c	15	21	14
(Indonesia) A B Cahyono (Indonesia) W O Kandow	19	19
6	(Malaysia) Chan P S (Malaysia) Goh L Y	21	21
Q3	(Indonesia) A Ramadiansyah (Indonesia) A Saufika	18	13
(South Korea) Seo S-j (South Korea) Chae Y-j	21	21
(England) M Ellis (England) L Smith	21	16	21
PFQ	(Indonesia) A E Prasetya (Indonesia) M G Islami	19	21	10

Second Round
(England) B Lane (England) J Pugh	13	10
6	(Malaysia) Chan P S (Malaysia) Goh L Y	21	21
(South Korea) Seo S-j (South Korea) Chae Y-j	25	16	15
(England) M Ellis (England) L Smith	23	21	21

Quarter-finals
6	(Malaysia) Chan P S (Malaysia) Goh L Y	21	22
(England) M Ellis (England) L Smith	11	20

Preceded by 2019 Malaysia Masters	BWF World Tour; 2019 BWF season	Succeeded by 2019 Spain Masters
