= Athletics at the 2004 Commonwealth Youth Games =

Athletics at the II Commonwealth Youth Games
- Dates: 2 – 3 December
- Host city: Bendigo, Australia
- Venue: La Trobe University Athletics Complex
- Events: 34

At the 2004 Commonwealth Youth Games, the athletics events were held at the La Trobe University Athletics Complex in Bendigo, Australia from 2–3 December. A total of 34 events were contested, divided equally between the sexes. Among the medallists on the girls' side were Dani Samuels (the 2009 discus world champion) and two 2012 Olympic champions, Sally McLellan (100 m hurdles) and Jessica Ennis (heptathlon).

== Medal table ==
* Host nation (Australia)

Rank	Nation	Gold	Silver	Bronze	Total
1	Australia*	15	10	6	31
2	England	9	10	7	26
3	South Africa	6	5	7	18
4	India	2	3	3	8
5	Scotland	2	3	2	7
6	New Zealand	0	3	6	9
7	Jersey	0	0	2	2
8	Ghana	0	0	1	1
8	Singapore	0	0	1	1
Totals (9 entries)		34	34	35	103

=== Boys ===
Event	Gold		Silver		Bronze	
100 metres	Brandan Galic (AUS)	10.76 GR	Harry Aikines-Aryeetey (ENG)	10.81	Graeme Read (NZL)	10.82
200 metres	Julian Thomas (ENG)	21.06 GR	Somto Eruchie (ENG)	21.37	Brandan Galic (AUS)	21.68
400 metres	Tristan Thomas (AUS)	47.06 GR	Ruaan Grobler (RSA)	48.07	Richard Buck (ENG)	48.21
800 metres	Bongani Sipho Mgemane (RSA)	1:50.67 GR	Brad Woods (AUS)	1:50.71	Michael Rimmer (ENG)	1:51.20
1500 metres	Isaac Mboyaza (RSA)	3:58.60 GR	Dane Frey (AUS)	4:00.08	Carl Mackenzie (NZL)	4:00.75
3000 metres	Tshamano Setone (RSA)	8:21.30 GR	Isaac Mboyaza (RSA)	8:21.73	Hayden McLaren (NZL)	8:34.25
110 metres hurdles	Ruan de Vries (RSA)	14.44	Oliver McNeillis (ENG)	14.72	Abdul Hakeem Bin Abdul Halim (SIN)	14.82
4 × 100 m relay	England (ENG); Bernard Yeboah; Julian Thomas; Harry Aikines-Aryeetey; Wade Bennett-Jackson	40.90 GR	New Zealand (NZL); Matt Brown; Graeme Read; Byron Smith; Daniel Natush	41.45	Australia (AUS); Brandan Galic; Adam Slezak; Matt Lynch; Chris Noffke	42.05
4 × 400 m relay	Australia (AUS); Brandan Galic; Matt Lynch; Tristan Thomas; Brad Woods	3:23.81	South Africa (RSA); Ernst Hattingh; Jeanre Rossouw; Ruaan Grobler; Bongani Sipho Mgemane	3:26.59	New Zealand (NZL); Matt Brown; Graeme Read; Sam Wilson; Scott Nicol	3:32.62
High jump	Hari Shankar Roy (IND)	2.13 m GR	Nick Stanisavljevic (ENG)	2.10 m	Fanie van Rensburg (RSA)	2.04 m
Pole vault	Joel Pocklington (AUS)	5.00 m GR	Barend Howell (RSA)	4.90 m	Liam O'Connell (NZL)	3.60 m
Long jump	Chris Noffke (AUS)	7.64 m w	Bernard Yeboah (ENG)	7.60 m GR	Regan Julius (RSA)	7.45 m
Triple jump	Graeme Matthews (ENG)	15.13 m w	Scott McLeod-Robertson (AUS)	15.09 m w	Jude Beimers (SCO)	14.38 m w
Shot put	Sourabh Vij (IND)	18.45 m GR	Chris Gearing (ENG)	18.30 m	Donovan Snyman (RSA)	17.02 m
Discus throw	Ronnie Buckley (AUS)	56.45 m GR	Harpreet Singh (IND)	53.16 m	Chris Gearing (ENG)	50.81 m
Hammer throw	Alexander Smith (ENG)	70.45 m GR	Simon Wardhaugh (AUS)	70.06 m	Ashok Tiwari (IND)	66.03 m
Javelin throw	James Campbell (SCO)	67.21 m GR	Arun Kumar Patel (IND)	65.01 m	Matthew Outzen (AUS)	62.55 m

=== Girls ===
Event	Gold		Silver		Bronze	
100 metres	Joscelynn Hopeson (ENG)	12.18	Michelle Cutmore (AUS)	12.24	Sally McLellan (AUS)	12.26
200 metres	Michelle Cutmore (AUS)	24.45	Laura Verlinden (AUS)	24.62	Joey Duck (ENG)	24.87
400 metres	Amanda Kotze (RSA)	56.16	Gemma Nicol (SCO)	56.62	Vivian Mills (GHA)	57.22
800 metres	Danielle Christmas (ENG)	2:10.38	Katherine Katsanevakis (AUS)	2:10.41	Angela Wagner (RSA)	2:10.82
1500 metres	Morag MacLarty (SCO)	4:29.25 GR	Nikki Hamblin (ENG)	4:31.11	Madeline Heiner (AUS)	4:32.13
3000 metres	Madeline Heiner (AUS)	9:42.95 GR	Sarah Morgan (NZL)	10:14.95	Chanelle Olivier (RSA)	10:49.64
100 metres hurdles	Sally McLellan (AUS)	14.11 GR	Jessica Ennis (ENG)	14.50	Christine Ras (RSA)	14.75
4 × 100 m relay	England (ENG); Joscelynn Hopeson; Johnelle Gibbons; Joey Duck; Lucy Sargent	45.63 GR	Australia (AUS); Michelle Cutmore; Sally McLellan; Laura Verlinden; Megan Wheatley	46.08	South Africa (RSA); Thandi Mngwevu; Amanda Kotze; Christine Ras; Isabel Le Roux	47.46
4 × 400 m relay	South Africa (RSA); Thandi Mngwevu; Isabel Le Roux; Amanda Kotze; Angela Wagner	3:52.53	Scotland (SCO); Noni Mordi; Kim Skinner; Gemma Nicol; Morag MacLarty	3:53.82	Australia (AUS); Laura Verlinden; Michelle Cutmore; Sally McLellan; Katherine Katsanevakis	3:56.37
High jump	Sophia Begg (AUS)	1.78 m	Jessica Ennis (ENG)	1.75 m	Kavya Chottekalapanda (IND) Kylie Leydon (NZL)	1.70 m
Pole vault	Katrina Miroshnichenko (AUS)	3.85 m GR	Kim Skinner (SCO)	3.60 m	Natalie Olson (ENG)	3.60 m
Long jump	Amy Harris (ENG)	6.19 m w	Jessica Penney (NZL)	6.06 m GR	Reshmi Bose (IND)	5.95 m
Triple jump	Alysha House (AUS)	12.80 m w	Revathi Krishnan (IND)	12.78 m GR	Yasmine Regis-Moses (ENG)	12.60 m w
Shot put	Dani Samuels (AUS)	15.50 m GR	Marli Knoetze (RSA)	15.36 m	Chloe Edwards (ENG)	13.26 m
Discus throw	Dani Samuels (AUS)	49.92 m GR	Calista Lyon (AUS)	48.47 m	Lauren Therin (JER)	44.81 m
Hammer throw	Sam Hynes (ENG)	54.07 m GR	Michelle Schlechter (AUS)	47.73 m	Laura Chalmers (SCO)	46.79 m
Javelin throw	Annabel Thomson (AUS)	51.99 m GR	Jo Blair (ENG)	49.85 m	Lauren Therin (JER)	42.86 m
