= 2012 European Athletics Championships – Men's hammer throw =

Sporting event in Helsinki

Men's hammer throw at the European Athletics Championships

The men's hammer throw at the 2012 European Athletics Championships was held at the Helsinki Olympic Stadium on 28 and 30 June.

== Medalists ==
Gold	Krisztián Pars; Hungary
Silver	Aleksey Zagornyi; Russia
Bronze	Szymon Ziółkowski; Poland

== Records ==
Standing records prior to the 2010 European Athletics Championships
World record	Yuriy Sedykh (URS)	86.74	Stuttgart, West Germany	30 August 1986
European record	Yuriy Sedykh (URS)	86.74	Stuttgart, West Germany	30 August 1986
Championship record	Yuriy Sedykh (URS)	86.74	Stuttgart, West Germany	30 August 1986
World Leading	Ivan Tsikhan (BLR)	82.81	Brest, Belarus	25 May 2012
European Leading	Ivan Tsikhan (BLR)	82.81	Brest, Belarus	25 May 2012

== Schedule ==
Date	Time	Round
28 June 2012	13:55	Qualification
30 June 2012	21:05	Final

== Results ==
=== Qualification ===
Qualification: Qualification Performance 77.50 (Q) or at least 12 best performers advance to the final

Rank	Group	Athlete	Nationality	#1	#2	#3	Result	Notes
1	A	Krisztián Pars	Hungary	77.16	x	78.09	78.09	Q
2	B	Nicola Vizzoni	Italy	73.99	76.42	74.18	76.42	q, SB
3	B	Oleksiy Sokyrskyy	Ukraine	75.35	x	72.56	75.35	q
4	A	Olli-Pekka Karjalainen	Finland	74.54	x	x	74.54	q
5	B	Pavel Kryvitski	Belarus	70.78	x	74.39	74.39	q
6	B	Markus Esser	Germany	74.04	73.42	x	74.04	q
7	A	Aleksey Zagornyi	Russia	72.10	73.55	74.00	74.00	q
8	A	Marcel Lomnický	Slovakia	73.84	73.32	x	73.84	q
9	B	Szymon Ziółkowski	Poland	72.05	x	73.74	73.74	q
10	A	Jérôme Bortoluzzi	France	70.29	73.46	x	73.46	q
11	B	Valeriy Sviatokha	Belarus	73.01	x	70.48	73.01	q
12	A	Mattias Jons	Sweden	71.56	72.85	x	72.85	q
13	A	Nicolas Figère	France	72.84	71.17	x	72.84	
14	A	Eivind Henriksen	Norway	72.54	x	71.49	72.54	
15	A	Lorenzo Povegliano	Italy	x	72.47	x	72.47	
16	B	Kristóf Németh	Hungary	69.42	71.23	72.46	72.46	
17	A	Yury Shayunou	Belarus	x	72.18	72.07	72.18	
18	B	Anatoliy Pozdnyakov	Russia	69.08	67.84	71.79	71.79	
19	A	Andriy Martynyuk	Ukraine	71.48	68.39	71.69	71.69	
20	B	Tuomas Seppänen	Finland	69.84	70.47	71.15	71.15	
21	A	Marco Lingua	Italy	x	70.81	71.07	71.07	
22	B	Javier Cienfuegos	Spain	x	70.91	x	70.91	
23	B	Igors Sokolovs	Latvia	69.77	x	70.80	70.80	
24	B	Quentin Bigot	France	68.36	x	70.78	70.78	
25	B	Mark Dry	Great Britain	69.32	x	70.27	70.27	
26	B	Libor Charfreitag	Slovakia	x	69.65	x	69.65	
27	A	Andraš Haklić	Croatia	69.31	x	x	69.31	
28	B	Lukáš Melich	Czech Republic	x	68.92	x	68.92	
29	A	Konstantinos Stathelakos	Cyprus	68.07	67.30	68.20	68.20	
30	A	Dorian Collaku	Albania	59.44	59.92	x	59.92	
	A	David Söderberg	Finland	x	x	x	NM	

=== Final ===
Rank	Athlete	Nationality	#1	#2	#3	#4	#5	#6	Result	Notes
1st place, gold medalist(s)	Krisztián Pars	Hungary	78.57	79.40	x	79.72	79.46	77.47	79.72	
2nd place, silver medalist(s)	Aleksey Zagornyi	Russia	74.97	76.51	x	x	75.92	77.40	77.40	
3rd place, bronze medalist(s)	Szymon Ziółkowski	Poland	76.44	x	x	x	74.31	76.67	76.67	
4	Valeriy Sviatokha	Belarus	75.83	x	x	73.34	73.15	75.07	75.83	
5	Nicola Vizzoni	Italy	75.13	74.77	74.22	74.77	x	x	75.13	
6	Mattias Jons	Sweden	74.50	73.64	x	74.56	x	74.44	74.56	
7	Markus Esser	Germany	74.18	73.26	73.00	74.49	72.23	74.43	74.49	
8	Jérôme Bortoluzzi	France	73.89	74.49	73.10	x	73.89	74.05	74.49	
9	Pavel Kryvitski	Belarus	x	x	73.67				73.67	
10	Olli-Pekka Karjalainen	Finland	69.97	73.08	73.48				73.48	
11	Marcel Lomnický	Slovakia	73.41	x	72.97				73.41	
	Oleksiy Sokyrskyy	Ukraine	x	x	x				NM	
