= 2009 European Athletics U23 Championships – Men's hammer throw =

The men's hammer throw event at the 2009 European Athletics U23 Championships was held in Kaunas, Lithuania, at S. Dariaus ir S. Girėno stadionas (Darius and Girėnas Stadium) on 18 and 19 July.

== Medalists ==
Gold	Yury Shayunou; Belarus
Silver	Anatoliy Pozdnyakov; Russia
Bronze	Alexander Ziegler; Germany

== Results ==
=== Final ===
19 July

Rank	Name	Nationality	Attempts						Result	Notes
Rank	Name	Nationality	1	2	3	4	5	6	Result	Notes
1st place, gold medalist(s)	Yury Shayunou	Belarus	75.78	x	76.86	78.16	x	x	78.16	
2nd place, silver medalist(s)	Anatoliy Pozdnyakov	Russia	x	x	68.70	71.35	72.42	70.05	72.42	
3rd place, bronze medalist(s)	Alexander Ziegler	Germany	x	70.62	70.87	68.88	72.32	70.46	72.32	
4	Kristóf Németh	Hungary	69.92	71.85	70.57	69.37	69.95	70.66	71.85	
5	Dmytro Mykolaychuk	Ukraine	68.84	69.47	70.65	68.97	69.77	x	70.65	
6	Marcel Lomnický	Slovakia	69.86	69.05	67.53	68.24	69.94	70.59	70.59	
7	Alex Smith	United Kingdom	64.53	65.80	68.75	66.47	63.32	66.20	68.75	
8	Paweł Fajdek	Poland	x	68.70	65.94	x	x	x	68.70	
9	Pavel Bukvic	Czech Republic	65.93	68.61	x				68.61	
10	Yevgeniy Aydamirov	Russia	68.47	x	x				68.47	
11	Siarhei Kalamoyets	Belarus	65.62	x	x				65.62	
12	Lorenzo Rocchi	Italy	63.69	65.57	x				65.57	

=== Qualifications ===
18 July
Qualifying 69.50 or 12 best to the Final

==== Group A ====
Rank	Name	Nationality	Result	Notes
1	Yury Shayunou	Belarus	74.87	Q
2	Marcel Lomnický	Slovakia	70.73	Q
3	Alex Smith	United Kingdom	68.53	q
4	Anatoliy Pozdnyakov	Russia	68.53	q
5	Lorenzo Rocchi	Italy	67.24	q
6	Matt Lambley	United Kingdom	65.22	
7	Joachim Koivu	Finland	64.91	
8	Bartłomiej Molenda	Poland	63.71	
9	Dimitrios Filladitakis	Greece	63.24	
10	Benjamin Hedermann	Germany	61.64	
11	Máté Dobos	Hungary	61.2	
12	Adrian Pop	Romania	60.17	
	Matej Muža	Croatia	NM	

==== Group B ====
Rank	Name	Nationality	Result	Notes
1	Alexander Ziegler	Germany	71..10	Q
2	Kristóf Németh	Hungary	67.80	q
3	Yevgeniy Aydamirov	Russia	66.88	q
4	Paweł Fajdek	Poland	66.50	q
5	Pavel Bukvic	Czech Republic	66.45	q
6	Siarhei Kalamoyets	Belarus	66.44	q
7	Dmytro Mykolaychuk	Ukraine	65.42	q
8	Mark Dry	United Kingdom	65.05	
9	Konstadinos Stathelakos	Greece	64.99	
10	Isaac Vicente	Spain	64.29	
11	Mirko Mičuda	Croatia	62.93	
12	Andrei Alestar	Romania	62.29	

== Participation ==
According to an unofficial count, 25 athletes from 15 countries participated in the event.

- Belarus (2)
- Croatia (2)
- Czech Republic (1)
- Finland (1)
- Germany (2)
- Greece (2)
- Hungary (2)
- Italy (1)
- Poland (2)
- Romania (2)
- Russia (2)
- Slovakia (1)
- Spain (1)
- Ukraine (1)
- United Kingdom (3)
