= 2014 British Athletics Championships =

- Dates: 27–29 June 2014
- Host city: Birmingham, England
- Venue: Alexander Stadium
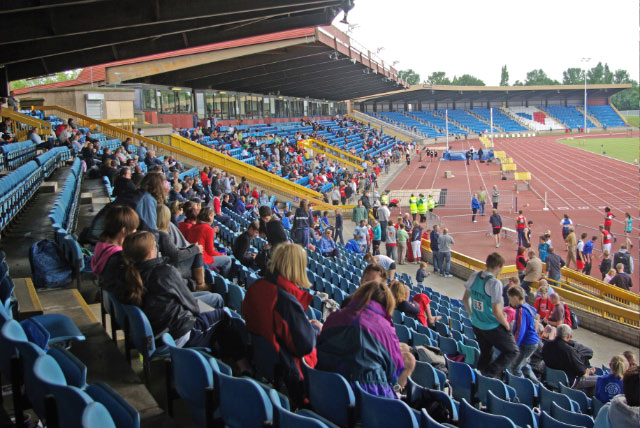
- Level: Senior
- Type: Outdoor

The 2014 British Athletics Championships was the national championship in outdoor track and field for athletes in the United Kingdom, held 27–29 June 2014 at Alexander Stadium in Birmingham. It was organised by UK Athletics. It served as a selection meeting for the 2014 European Athletics Championships.

== Medal summary ==
=== Men ===
Event	Gold		Silver		Bronze	
100m Wind: 0.3 m/s	Dwain Chambers	10.12	Harry Aikines-Aryeetey	10.14	Chijindu Ujah	10.18
200m wind: -0.8 m/s	Danny Talbot	20.42	Adam Gemili	20.61	James Ellington	20.64
400m	Martyn Rooney	45.78	Conrad Williams	45.88	Michael Bingham	46.32
800m	Michael Rimmer	1:48.00	Mukhtar Mohammed	1:48.20	Andrew Osagie	1:48.37
1,500m	Charlie Grice	3:46.97	William Paulson	3:48.16	Richard Peters	3:48.33
5,000m	Tom Farrell	13:51.43	Ross Millington	13:52.04	Jonathan Mellor	13:54.11
110m hurdles wind: 2.4 m/s	William Sharman	13.18	Lawrence Clarke	13.61	Alex Al-Ameen	13.64
400m hurdles	Niall Flannery	49.54	Tom Burton	49.78	Sebastian Rodger	50.07
3000m s'chase	James Wilkinson	8:37.36	Luke Gunn	8:43.80	(Wales) Ieuan Thomas	8:46.07
5000m walk	(Australia) Dane Bird-Smith	19:14.53	Tom Bosworth	19:16.82 NR	(New Zealand) Quentin Rew	20:07.00
high jump	(Scotland) Allan Smith	2.24 m	Chris Baker	2.24 m	Matthew Roberts	2.20 m
pole vault	Steven Lewis	5.55 m	Paul Walker	5.35 m	Andrew Sutcliffe	5.35 m
long jump	JJ Jegede	7.83 m (0.0 m/s)	Dan Bramble	7.77 m (-0.1 m/s)	Matthew Burton	7.73 m (-0.4 m/s)
triple jump	Julian Reid	16.82 m (0.0 m/s)	Ben Williams	16.73 m (2.3 m/s)	Nathan Fox	16.59 m (2.7 m/s)
shot put	Scott Rider	18.34 m	Zane Duquemin	18.00 m	Ryan Spencer-Jones	17.23 m
discus throw	Zane Duquemin	60.38 m	(Wales) Brett Morse	60.26 m	Daniel Greaves	59.34 m
hammer throw	Nick Miller	73.96 m	Alex Smith	73.52 m	(Scotland) Mark Dry	73.27 m
javelin throw	Lee Doran	70.71 m	Bonne Buwembo	70.59 m	(Scotland) James Campbell	68.12 m

=== Women ===
event	Gold		Silver		Bronze	
100m wind: 3.6 m/s	Asha Philip	11.11	Ashleigh Nelson	11.15	Jodie Williams	11.15
200m wind: 0.9 m/s	Jodie Williams	22.79	Bianca Williams	22.88	Anyika Onuora	22.97
400m	Kelly Massey	52.42	Shana Cox	52.51	Emily Diamond	52.75
800m	(Scotland) Lynsey Sharp	2:01.40	Alison Leonard	2:01.83	Jenny Meadows	2:02.18
1,500m	Laura Weightman	4:09.77	(Scotland) Laura Muir	4:10.01	Hannah England	4:12.37
5,000m	Emelia Gorecka	15:40.65	Jo Pavey	15:40.90	(Scotland) Laura Whittle	15:50.21
100m hurdles wind: 0.5 m/s	Tiffany Porter	12.85	Lucy Hatton	13.20	Serita Solomon	13.22
400m hurdles	(Scotland) Eilidh Child	55.58	Meghan Beesley	56.12	Hayley McLean	56.43
3000m s'chase	(Scotland) Eilish McColgan	9:50.06	(Scotland) Lennie Waite	9:53.03	Racheal Bamford	10:10.11
5000m walk	Heather Lewis	22:09.87	Alana Barber	22:11.52	Emma Achurch	24:14.96
high jump	Isobel Pooley	1.90 m	Katarina Johnson-Thompson	1.86 m	Morgan Lake	1.82 m
pole vault	Sally Peake	4.30 m	Katie Byres	4.10 m	Sally Scott	4.10 m
long jump	Katarina Johnson-Thompson	6.81 (1.9 m/s)	Jazmin Sawyers	6.49 (1.0 m/s)	(Scotland) Sarah Warnock	6.42 (1.7 m/s)
triple jump	Yamilé Aldama	13.60 (-1.7 m/s)	Laura Samuel	13.58 (1.0 m/s)	Chioma Matthews	13.25 (-0.4 m/s)
shot put	Eden Francis	16.66 m	Rachel Wallader	16.54 m	Sophie McKinna	15.79 m
discus throw	Eden Francis	55.93 m	Jade Lally	54.58 m	(Scotland) Kirsty Law	54.00 m
hammer throw	Sophie Hitchon	65.56 m	Carys Parry	63.33 m	Louisa James	62.30 m
javelin throw	Goldie Sayers	62.75 m	Izzy Jeffs	54.53 m	Joanna Blair	49.82 m
