= 2004 World Junior Championships in Athletics – Men's hammer throw =

The men's hammer throw event at the 2004 World Junior Championships in Athletics was held in Grosseto, Italy, at Stadio Olimpico Carlo Zecchini on 15 and 16 July. A 6 kg (junior implement) hammer was used.

== Medalists ==
Gold	Andrey Azarenkov; Russia
Silver	Mohsen Anany; Egypt
Bronze	Kamilius Bethke; Germany

== Results ==
=== Final ===
16 July

Rank	Name	Nationality	Attempts						Result	Notes
Rank	Name	Nationality	1	2	3	4	5	6	Result	Notes
1st place, gold medalist(s)	Andrey Azarenkov	Russia	73.88	67.82	74.11	x	73.62	68.72	74.11	
2nd place, silver medalist(s)	Mohsen Anany	Egypt	68.34	72.47	72.98	68.88	x	70.82	72.98	
3rd place, bronze medalist(s)	Kamilius Bethke	Germany	70.94	69.07	71.91	67.55	x	x	71.91	
4	Kristóf Németh	Hungary	64.63	x	68.19	69.23	71.40	70.21	71.40	
5	Simon Wardhaugh	Australia	67.31	x	64.75	x	68.07	70.60	70.60	
6	Mikhail Levin	Russia	70.39	67.25	66.52	62.74	68.62	67.90	70.39	
7	Matko Tesija	Croatia	69.65	70.02	67.33	70.14	x	69.57	70.14	
8	Olexiy Sokirskiy	Ukraine	63.28	65.58	67.34	x	x	68.33	68.33	
9	Sergej Litvinov	Belarus	x	61.63	67.11				67.11	
10	Sándor Pálhegyi	Hungary	66.97	x	64.66				66.97	
11	Michal Fiala	Czech Republic	x	x	64.74				64.74	
12	Andreas Sahner	Germany	x	62.76	62.35				62.76	

=== Qualifications ===
15 July

==== Group A ====
Rank	Name	Nationality	Attempts			Result	Notes
Rank	Name	Nationality	1	2	3	Result	Notes
1	Kamilius Bethke	Germany	70.99	-	-	70.99	Q
2	Mohsen Anany	Egypt	70.35	-	-	70.35	Q
3	Mikhail Levin	Russia	67.44	68.43	66.95	68.43	q
4	Matko Tesija	Croatia	68.03	x	67.44	68.03	q
5	Kristóf Németh	Hungary	64.99	67.64	x	67.64	q
6	Yury Shayunov	Belarus	66.89	65.85	x	66.89	
7	Marcel Lomnický	Slovakia	65.79	x	x	65.79	
8	Kaveh Mousavi	Iran	24.50	65.23	x	65.23	
9	Mikko Järvinen	Finland	x	64.32	x	64.32	
10	Berguer Ingi Petursson	Iceland	63.69	59.38	x	63.69	
	Lin Ming-Chien	Chinese Taipei	x	x	x	NM	
	Nick Owens	United States	x	x	x	NM	

==== Group B ====
Rank	Name	Nationality	Attempts			Result	Notes
Rank	Name	Nationality	1	2	3	Result	Notes
1	Olexiy Sokirskiy	Ukraine	69.20	72.22	-	72.22	Q
2	Andrey Azarenkov	Russia	70.76	-	-	70.76	Q
3	Andreas Sahner	Germany	x	60.47	70.71	70.71	Q
4	Michal Fiala	Czech Republic	69.65	-	-	69.65	Q
5	Sándor Pálhegyi	Hungary	50.96	65.82	69.22	69.22	q
6	Sergej Litvinov	Belarus	66.53	68.65	61.97	68.65	q
7	Simon Wardhaugh	Australia	x	x	67.31	67.31	q
8	Zhao Yihai	China	x	x	66.87	66.87	
9	Cory Martin	United States	66.41	x	65.49	66.41	
10	Turgay Çabukel	Turkey	66.05	x	65.00	66.05	
11	Juha Kauppinen	Finland	63.94	64.52	65.53	65.53	
12	Lorenzo Rocchi	Italy	61.22	61.21	61.61	61.61	

== Participation ==
According to an unofficial count, 24 athletes from 18 countries participated in the event.

- Australia (1)
- Belarus (2)
- China (1)
- Chinese Taipei (1)
- Croatia (1)
- Czech Republic (1)
- Egypt (1)
- Finland (2)
- Germany (2)
- Hungary (2)
- Iceland (1)
- Iran (1)
- Italy (1)
- Russia (2)
- Slovakia (1)
- Turkey (1)
- Ukraine (1)
- United States (2)
