= Joanna Blair =

British javelin thrower (born 1986)

Personal information
- Born: 1 March 1986 (age 40) Luton, England

Sport
- Sport: Athletics
- Club: Luton AC
Medal record
Javelin
Commonwealth Youth Games
Silver medal – second place	2004 Bendigo	Javelin
AAA Championships
Silver medal – second place	2006 Manchester	Javelin
British Athletics Championships
Bronze medal – third place	2014 Birmingham	Javelin
Gold medal – first place	2016 Birmingham	Javelin
Silver medal – second place	2017 Birmingham	Javelin

Joanna Blair (born 1 March 1986) is a British javelin thrower who won the javelin event at the 2016 British Athletics Championships and England Athletics Championships, came second in the events at the 2004 Commonwealth Youth Games, 2006 AAA Championships and 2017 British Athletics Championships, and came third at the 2014 British Athletics Championships.

== Career ==
Blair trained at Luton Athletics Club, and also worked as a sports masseuse. In 2003, she won the English Schools Senior Championship javelin event. She came second in the javelin event at the 2004 Commonwealth Youth Games, behind Australian Annabel Thomson. Blair competed at the 2005 European Athletics Junior Championships. She came second in the 2006 AAA Championships. She came seventh in the 2010 South of England Championships, with a best throw of 42.20m.

Blair came third in the javelin event at the 2014 British Athletics Championships. She won the javelin event at the 2016 British Athletics Championships, in a personal best distance of 57.44m, more than three metres better than her previous best. It was the seventh best throw ever by a British female javelin thrower. Later in the year, she won the England Athletics Championships with a best throw of 52.63m, and she was named Luton's female sportsperson of the year.

In 2017, she competed at the Nitro Athletics team event in Australia. She failed to qualify for the 2017 World Championships in Athletics in London; the qualifying distance was 61.50 metres. She came second at the 2017 trial event for the 2018 Commonwealth Games in Australia, and was considered a contender for a place at the Games. She came second to Laura Whittingham at the 2017 British Athletics Championships.

Blair served a four-year competition ban from 2017 to 2021 for an anti-doping rule violation after testing positive for the anabolic steroid metandienone whilst attending the 2017 European Team Championships in French in June 2017. UK Anti-Doping (UKAD) did not accept her explanation that she had unintentionaly ingested the substance via a contaminated supplement. Her results at the European Team Championships were disqualified.
