= Mikhail Levin (disambiguation) =

Mikhail Levin (born 1969) is a Russian football player.

Mikhail Levin may also refer to:

- Michel Michelet (1894–1995), composer, born Mikhail Isaakovich Levin
- Mikhail Levin (athlete) (born 1986), Russian athlete
