= Athletics at the 2014 Commonwealth Games – Men's hammer throw =

Men's hammer throw at the Commonwealth Games

The Men's hammer throw at the 2014 Commonwealth Games as part of the athletics programme took place at Hampden Park on 28 and 29 July 2014.

== Results ==
=== Qualifying round ===
| Rank | Group | Athlete | #1 | #2 | #3 | Result | Notes |
|---|---|---|---|---|---|---|---|
| 1 | A | Nick Miller (ENG) | x | 64.34 | 72.76 | 72.76 | Q |
| 2 | A | Alex Smith (ENG) | 72.34 | | | 72.34 | Q |
| 3 | B | Mark Dry (SCO) | 71.62 | | | 71.62 | Q |
| 4 | B | Jim Steacy (CAN) | 70.62 | | | 70.62 | Q |
| 5 | A | Timothy Driesen (AUS) | 54.84 | 69.63 | 69.40 | 69.63 | q |
| 6 | B | Amir Williamson (ENG) | 62.85 | 68.42 | – | 68.42 | q |
| 7 | A | Chris Bennett (SCO) | 68.01 | 64.27 | 65.79 | 68.01 | q |
| 8 | A | Chandrodaya Narayan Singh (IND) | 67.95 | x | 67.20 | 67.95 | q |
| 9 | B | Andrew Frost (SCO) | 64.57 | 66.54 | 66.08 | 66.54 | q |
| 10 | B | Constantinos Stathelakos (CYP) | 66.17 | x | x | 66.17 | q |
| 11 | A | Dempsey McGuigan (NIR) | x | 64.50 | 66.16 | 66.16 | q |
| 12 | A | Alexandros Poursanidis (CYP) | 62.53 | 64.66 | 65.25 | 65.25 | q |
| 13 | B | Kamalpreet Singh (IND) | 65.25 | 62.90 | 63.67 | 65.25 | |
| 14 | B | Huw Peacock (AUS) | x | 63.95 | x | 63.95 | |
| 15 | A | Michael Kolokotronis (CYP) | 59.08 | 63.68 | 63.01 | 63.68 | |
| 16 | B | Jonathan Edwards (WAL) | 63.66 | 62.13 | x | 63.66 | |
| 17 | B | Osian Jones (WAL) | 57.86 | x | 61.30 | 61.30 | |
| 18 | A | Siew Cheer Jackie Wong (MAS) | 58.19 | 59.24 | 58.26 | 59.24 | |
| 19 | A | Matthew Richards (AUS) | x | 56.95 | 58.52 | 58.52 | |
| 20 | B | Dean William (SEY) | x | x | 47.18 | 47.18 | |

=== Final ===
| Rank | Athlete | #1 | #2 | #3 | #4 | #5 | #6 | Result | Notes |
|---|---|---|---|---|---|---|---|---|---|
| 1st place, gold medalist(s) | Jim Steacy (CAN) | 72.61 | 74.16 | 72.87 | 73.35 | 73.98 | 73.54 | 74.16 | |
| 2nd place, silver medalist(s) | Nick Miller (ENG) | 70.80 | 72.99 | x | x | 59.01 | 72.07 | 72.99 | |
| 3rd place, bronze medalist(s) | Mark Dry (SCO) | 69.73 | 71.64 | x | 70.69 | x | x | 71.64 | |
| 4 | Alex Smith (ENG) | 70.48 | 68.42 | x | 70.99 | x | 69.58 | 70.99 | |
| 5 | Timothy Driesen (AUS) | x | 69.01 | 69.24 | 69.23 | 69.94 | 68.98 | 69.94 | |
| 6 | Amir Williamson (ENG) | 69.38 | 68.70 | 68.41 | 66.18 | 65.60 | 67.05 | 69.38 | |
| 7 | Constantinos Stathelakos (CYP) | x | x | 68.22 | x | x | x | 68.22 | |
| 8 | Chandrodaya Narayan Singh (IND) | 67.65 | 67.45 | x | 66.25 | x | 67.99 | 67.99 | |
| 9 | Andrew Frost (SCO) | 62.26 | x | 66.63 | | | | 66.63 | |
| 10 | Alexandros Poursanidis (CYP) | 64.77 | 65.66 | 63.83 | | | | 65.66 | |
| 11 | Dempsey McGuigan (NIR) | 64.16 | 64.79 | x | | | | 64.79 | |
| 12 | Chris Bennett (SCO) | 61.70 | 61.92 | x | | | | 61.92 | |
