= Athletics at the 2012 Summer Olympics – Men's hammer throw =

Men's hammer throw at the Games of the XXX Olympiad
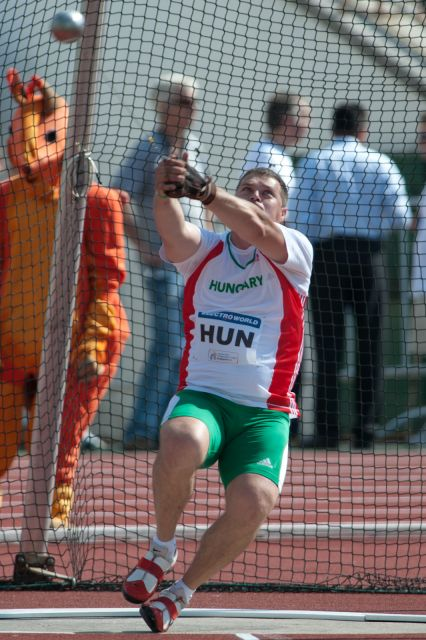
- Krisztián Pars (2010)
- Venue: Olympic Stadium
- Dates: 3–5 August
- Competitors: 41 from 32 nations
- Winning distance: 80.59

Medalists
1st place, gold medalist(s)		Krisztián Pars; Hungary
2nd place, silver medalist(s)		Primož Kozmus; Slovenia
3rd place, bronze medalist(s)		Koji Murofushi; Japan

Official Video Highlights

The men's hammer throw competition at the 2012 Summer Olympics in London, United Kingdom was held at the Olympic Stadium on 3–5 August. There were 41 competitors from 32 nations. The event was won by Krisztián Pars of Hungary, the nation's first victory in the men's hammer throw since 1996 and fifth overall (third-most all-time behind the United States' seven and the Soviet Union's six). Primož Kozmus of Slovenia, the 2008 winner, took silver. Koji Murofushi of Japan, the 2004 winner, took bronze. Kozmus and Murofoshi were the 12th and 13th men to earn multiple medals in the hammer throw.

== Background ==
This was the 26th appearance of the event, which has been held at every Summer Olympics except 1896. Seven of the 12 finalists from the 2008 Games returned: gold medalist Primož Kozmus of Slovenia, fourth-place finisher (and 2004 finalist) Krisztián Pars of Hungary, fifth-place finisher (and 2008 gold medalist and 2000 finalist) Koji Murofushi of Japan, seventh-place finisher (and 2000 gold medalist) Szymon Ziółkowski of Poland, tenth-place finisher András Haklits of Croatia, eleventh-place finisher Dilshod Nazarov of Tajikistan, and twelfth-place finisher James Steacy of Canada. After a retesting of his 2004 sample (which resulted in his 2004 silver medal being stripped), 2008 bronze medalist and 2012 world leader Ivan Tsikhan's entry was withdrawn. Kozmus had won the 2009 World Championship and finished third in 2011; Murofoshi had won the 2011 Worlds with Pars the runner-up. Pars was the favorite in London.

Azerbaijan, Cyprus, and Iran each made their debut in the event. The United States appeared for the 25th time, most of any nation, having missed only the boycotted 1980 Games.

== Summary ==
In the preliminary round, Primož Kozmus only needed one throw to make the automatic qualifier, while Krisztián Pars threw the best qualifying effort 79.37 on his second attempt. Koji Murofushi was the only other automatic qualifier, also in his second attempt. It took 74.69 to make the final.

Pars entered the final with the best 2012 performance among the finalists and took the lead with his first throw. Immediately before him, Kozmus threw far enough to win silver. Olexiy Sokyrskiyy put himself in third place with his second effort. That lasted until the third round when Murofushi's best effort put him in the bronze medal position. But one throw before, Pars let loose the only plus 80 metre throw, solidifying his grasp on the gold medal. After three fouls, in the fifth round Kozmus improved his hold on silver, but was still 1.23 behind the winner.

A great deal of photojournalist attention was devoted to the mini Cooper vehicles being used to retrieve the implements during the competition. The vehicles were used throughout the Olympics, but first appeared in the preliminary round of the hammer.

== Qualification ==
A National Olympic Committee (NOC) could enter up to 3 qualified athletes in the men's hammer throw event if all athletes met the A standard, or 1 athlete if they met the B standard. The maximum number of athletes per nation had been set at 3 since the 1930 Olympic Congress. The qualifying distance standards could be obtained in various meets during the qualifying period that had the approval of the IAAF. Both outdoor and indoor meets were eligible. The A standard for the 2012 men's hammer throw was 78.00 metres; the B standard was 74.00 metres. The qualifying period for was from 1 May 2011 to 8 July 2012. NOCs could also have an athlete enter the hammer throw through a universality place. NOCs could enter one male athlete in an athletics event, regardless of time, if they had no male athletes meeting the qualifying A or B standards in any men's athletic event.

== Competition format ==
Each athlete received three throws in the qualifying round. All who achieved the qualifying distance of 78.00 metres progressed to the final. If fewer than twelve athletes achieved this mark, then the twelve furthest throwing athletes would reach the final.

== Records ==
Prior to this competition, the existing world and Olympic records were as follows:

World record	Yuriy Sedykh (URS)	86.74	Stuttgart, Germany	30 August 1986
Olympic record	Sergey Litvinov (URS)	84.80	Seoul, South Korea	26 September 1988

No new world or Olympic records were set for this event.

== Schedule ==
All times are British Summer Time (UTC+1)

Date	Time	Round
Friday, 3 August 2012	11:20	Qualifying
Sunday, 5 August 2012	20:20	Final

== Results ==
=== Qualifying ===
- Entrants as of 27 July 2012.

Qual. rule: qualification standard 78.00m (Q) or at least best 12 qualified (q).

Rank	Group	Athlete	Nation	1	2	3	Distance	Notes
1	B	Krisztián Pars	Hungary	77.11	79.37	—	79.37	Q
2	A	Koji Murofushi	Japan	77.18	78.48	—	78.48	Q, SB
3	A	Primož Kozmus	Slovenia	78.12	—	—	78.12	Q, SB
4	A	Olexiy Sokyyrskiyy	Ukraine	X	X	77.65	77.65	q
5	A	Kibwe Johnson	United States	X	X	77.17	77.17	q, SB
~~6~~	A	Kirill Ikonnikov	Russia	X	~~76.43~~	~~76.85~~	~~76.85~~	q, DPG
7	A	Szymon Ziółkowski	Poland	76.22	X	75.68	76.22	q
8	A	Dilshod Nazarov	Tajikistan	~~73.90~~	X	~~75.91~~	~~75.91~~	q, DPG
9	A	Lukáš Melich	Czech Republic	75.88	75.29	72.49	75.88	q
10	A	Nicola Vizzoni	Italy	74.79	73.88	74.12	74.79	q
11	A	Alexander Smith	Great Britain	72.59	74.71	73.21	74.71	q
12	B	Valeriy Sviatokha	Belarus	73.11	73.07	74.69	74.69	q
13	B	Eivind Henriksen	Norway	72.67	X	74.62	74.62	
14	B	Jérôme Bortoluzzi	France	X	70.36	74.15	74.15	
15	B	Marcel Lomnicky	Slovakia	X	74.00	X	74.00	
16	B	Javier Cienfuegos	Spain	X	63.79	73.73	73.73	
17	A	Eşref Apak	Turkey	X	X	73.47	73.47	
18	B	Ali Al-Zinkawi	Kuwait	70.67	73.40	X	73.40	
19	B	Roberto Janet	Cuba	72.52	73.34	70.19	73.34	
20	B	Dzmitry Marshin	Azerbaijan	72.06	X	72.85	72.85	
21	A	Igors Sokolovs	Latvia	X	71.77	72.76	72.76	
22	B	Kaveh Mousavi	Iran	67.25	71.42	72.70	72.70	
23	B	Aleksey Zagornyi	Russia	71.02	72.52	X	72.52	
24	A	Quentin Bigot	France	69.22	68.17	72.42	72.42	
25	B	A. G. Kruger	United States	X	72.13	X	72.13	
26	B	David Söderberg	Finland	X	71.26	71.76	71.76	
27	B	Lorenzo Povegliano	Italy	71.55	68.77	X	71.55	
~~28~~	A	Pavel Kryvitski	Belarus	~~71.49~~	X	X	~~71.49~~	DPG
29	A	Mostafa Al-Gamel	Egypt	X	70.23	71.36	71.36	
30	A	András Haklits	Croatia	X	70.61	X	70.61	
31	A	Serghei Marghiev	Moldova	67.17	67.32	69.76	69.76	
32	B	Nicolas Figère	France	69.74	X	X	69.74	
33	B	Constantinos Stathelakos	Cyprus	69.65	X	X	69.65	
~~34~~	A	Oleksandr Dryhol	Ukraine	X	~~68.02~~	~~69.57~~	~~69.57~~	DPG
35	B	Mergen Mamedov	Turkmenistan	68.39	66.99	67.23	68.39	
36	B	Juan Ignacio Cerra	Argentina	65.82	66.25	68.20	68.20	
37	A	Alexandros Papadimitriou	Greece	X	66.91	67.19	67.19	
38	A	Suhrob Khodjaev	Uzbekistan	65.88	64.74	X	65.88	
—	B	Paweł Fajdek	Poland	X	X	X	NM	
—	B	Artem Rubanko	Ukraine	X	X	X	NM	
—	B	James Steacy	Canada	X	X	X	NM	

=== Final ===
Rank	Athlete	Nation	1	2	3	4	5	6	Distance	Notes
1st place, gold medalist(s)	Krisztián Pars	Hungary	79.14	78.33	80.59	79.70	79.28	78.88	80.59	
2nd place, silver medalist(s)	Primož Kozmus	Slovenia	78.97	X	X	X	79.36	78.59	79.36	SB
3rd place, bronze medalist(s)	Koji Murofushi	Japan	X	78.16	78.71	78.09	77.12	76.47	78.71	SB
4	Olexiy Sokyyrskiyy	Ukraine	76.51	78.25	X	X	X	76.99	78.25	
~~5~~	Kirill Ikonnikov	Russia	~~77.86~~	X	~~77.81~~	~~74.60~~	X	~~77.46~~	~~77.86~~	DPG
5	Lukáš Melich	Czech Republic	76.73	75.67	77.17	76.28	18.90	X	77.17	
6	Szymon Ziółkowski	Poland	75.69	74.95	76.30	76.88	77.10	75.86	77.10	
7	Nicola Vizzoni	Italy	75.75	75.84	75.41	76.07	75.79	X	76.07	
8	Kibwe Johnson	United States	73.31	74.95	X	Did not advance			74.95	
~~10~~	Dilshod Nazarov	Tajikistan	~~70.00~~	~~70.88~~	~~73.80~~	Did not advance			~~73.80~~	DPG
9	Valeriy Sviatokha	Belarus	73.13	72.78	72.42	Did not advance			73.13	
10	Alexander Smith	Great Britain	69.74	72.87	71.47	Did not advance			72.87	
