= 2006 World Junior Championships in Athletics – Men's hammer throw =

The men's hammer throw event at the 2006 World Junior Championships in Athletics was held in Beijing, China, at Chaoyang Sports Centre on 16 and 18 August. A 6 kg (junior implement) hammer was used.

== Medalists ==
| Gold | Yevgeniy Aydamirov; Russia |
| Silver | Kristóf Németh; Hungary |
| Bronze | Marcel Lomnický; Slovakia |

== Results ==
=== Final ===
18 August

| Rank | Name | Nationality | Attempts | | | | | | Result | Notes |
| Rank | Name | Nationality | 1 | 2 | 3 | 4 | 5 | 6 | Result | Notes |
|---|---|---|---|---|---|---|---|---|---|---|
| 1st place, gold medalist(s) | Yevgeniy Aydamirov | Russia | x | 78.42 | x | x | x | 75.72 | 78.42 | |
| 2nd place, silver medalist(s) | Kristóf Németh | Hungary | 76.35 | 78.39 | 78.33 | 77.16 | 77.00 | 75.32 | 78.39 | |
| 3rd place, bronze medalist(s) | Marcel Lomnický | Slovakia | 71.71 | 75.01 | 70.60 | 76.83 | 77.06 | x | 77.06 | |
| 4 | Yury Shayunov | Belarus | 74.98 | 75.81 | x | x | 76.95 | x | 76.95 | |
| 5 | Anatoliy Pozdnyakov | Russia | 75.74 | x | x | 75.64 | x | 76.09 | 76.09 | |
| 6 | Qi Dakai | China | 74.98 | 71.68 | 75.11 | 74.79 | 75.97 | 75.65 | 75.97 | |
| 7 | Benjamin Hedermann | Germany | x | x | 73.80 | 70.17 | x | 68.04 | 73.80 | |
| 8 | Walter Henning | United States | 70.28 | 71.52 | 71.90 | 68.33 | 71.33 | 71.55 | 71.90 | |
| 9 | Alexander Ziegler | Germany | 71.22 | x | 66.77 | | | | 71.22 | |
| 10 | Alexander Smith | United Kingdom | 69.69 | 68.65 | 70.77 | | | | 70.77 | |
| 11 | Shan Changcheng | China | x | 67.86 | x | | | | 67.86 | |
| 12 | Lorenzo Rocchi | Italy | 65.77 | x | x | | | | 65.77 | |

=== Qualifications ===
16 August

==== Group A ====
| Rank | Name | Nationality | Attempts | | | Result | Notes |
| Rank | Name | Nationality | 1 | 2 | 3 | Result | Notes |
|---|---|---|---|---|---|---|---|
| 1 | Kristóf Németh | Hungary | 73.86 | - | - | 73.86 | Q |
| 2 | Anatoliy Pozdnyakov | Russia | x | 72.89 | - | 72.89 | Q |
| 3 | Walter Henning | United States | x | 70.61 | 71.51 | 71.51 | Q |
| 4 | Qi Dakai | China | 70.73 | x | x | 70.73 | q |
| 5 | Alexander Ziegler | Germany | 69.57 | 69.31 | 70.64 | 70.64 | q |
| 6 | Lorenzo Rocchi | Italy | x | 65.98 | 70.59 | 70.59 | q |
| 7 | Amir Williamson | United Kingdom | 65.63 | 66.45 | 66.77 | 66.77 | |
| 8 | Dmitriy Mykolaychuk | Ukraine | x | x | 66.52 | 66.52 | |
| 9 | Isaac Vicente | Spain | 59.63 | 64.62 | 63.98 | 64.62 | |
| 10 | Evgeniy Shaytor | Belarus | 60.81 | x | 64.53 | 64.53 | |
| 11 | Konstadínos Stathelákos | Greece | x | x | 64.47 | 64.47 | |
| 12 | Ardít Merdanáj | Albania | x | 61.38 | 64.13 | 64.13 | |
| | Arno Laitinen | Finland | x | x | x | NM | |

==== Group B ====
| Rank | Name | Nationality | Attempts | | | Result | Notes |
| Rank | Name | Nationality | 1 | 2 | 3 | Result | Notes |
|---|---|---|---|---|---|---|---|
| 1 | Yury Shayunov | Belarus | 76.76 | - | - | 76.76 | Q |
| 2 | Yevgeniy Aydamirov | Russia | 70.35 | 75.90 | - | 75.90 | Q |
| 3 | Marcel Lomnický | Slovakia | 73.25 | - | - | 73.25 | Q |
| 4 | Shan Changcheng | China | x | 72.31 | - | 72.31 | Q |
| 5 | Alexander Smith | United Kingdom | 67.46 | 72.03 | - | 72.03 | Q |
| 6 | Benjamin Hedermann | Germany | 68.86 | 68.07 | 70.52 | 70.52 | q |
| 7 | Sándor Pálhegyi | Hungary | 68.78 | x | 68.44 | 68.78 | |
| 8 | Artyom Vynnyk | Ukraine | x | x | 67.79 | 67.79 | |
| 9 | Matej Muza | Croatia | 65.88 | x | 65.91 | 65.91 | |
| 10 | Samuli Heinänen | Finland | x | 65.68 | x | 65.68 | |
| 11 | Stefan Kvist | Sweden | 65.15 | 65.20 | 62.33 | 65.20 | |
| 12 | Pavel Bukvic | Czech Republic | x | 60.58 | x | 60.58 | |
| 13 | Amanmurad Hommadov | Turkmenistan | 52.24 | x | 54.54 | 54.54 | |
| | Bledar Disha | Albania | x | x | x | NM | |

== Participation ==
According to an unofficial count, 27 athletes from 18 countries participated in the event.

- Albania (2)
- Belarus (2)
- China (2)
- Croatia (1)
- Czech Republic (1)
- Finland (2)
- Germany (2)
- Greece (1)
- Hungary (2)
- Italy (1)
- Russia (2)
- Slovakia (1)
- Spain (1)
- Sweden (1)
- Turkmenistan (1)
- Ukraine (2)
- United Kingdom (2)
- United States (1)
