= Tuomas Seppänen =

Finnish hammer thrower (born 1986)

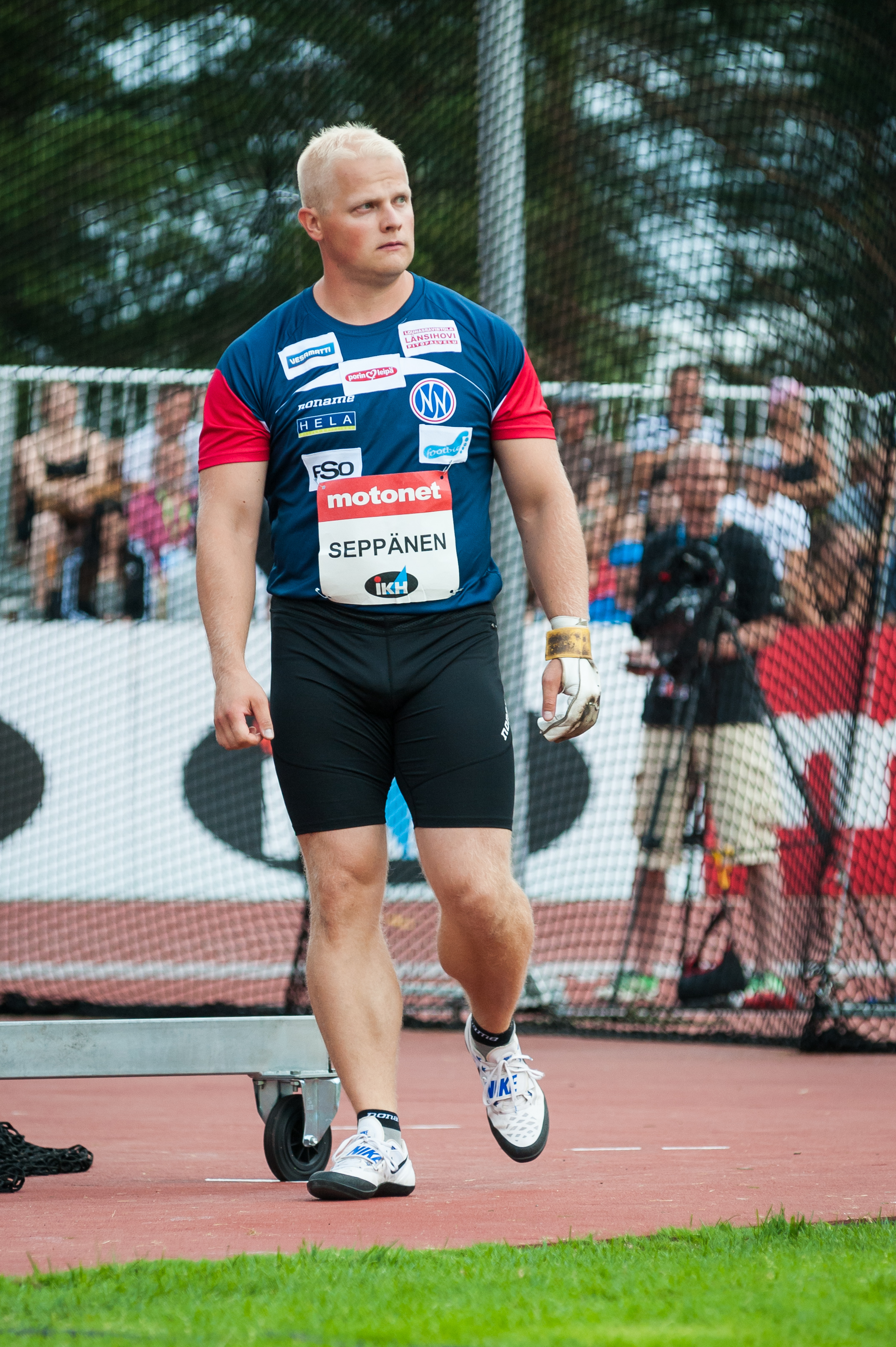
Tuomas Seppänen (2018)

Tuomas Kristian Seppänen (born 16 May 1986) is a Finnish athlete specialising in the hammer throw. He was born in Pori, and represented his country at three consecutive European Championships, his best outing being the twelfth place in 2014.

His personal best in the event is 76.20 metres set in 2016 in Halle.

== Competition record ==
Year	Competition	Venue	Position	Event	Notes
Representing Finland
2005	European Junior Championships	Kaunas, Lithuania	7th	Hammer throw (6 kg)	70.95 m
2007	European U23 Championships	Debrecen, Hungary	9th	Hammer throw	67.67 m
2010	European Championships	Barcelona, Spain	15th (q)	Hammer throw	72.94 m
2011	Universiade	Shenzhen, China	7th	Hammer throw	71.04 m
2012	European Championships	Helsinki, Finland	20th (q)	Hammer throw	71.15 m
2013	Universiade	Kazan, Russia	7th	Hammer throw	73.89 m
2014	European Championships	Zürich, Switzerland	12th	Hammer throw	73.70 m
2015	World Championships	Beijing, China	10th	Hammer throw	73.18 m
2016	European Championships	Amsterdam, Netherlands	23rd (q)	Hammer throw	69.76 m
2022	World Championships	Eugene, United States	23rd (q)	Hammer throw	72.81 m
2022	European Championships	Munich, Germany	16th (q)	Hammer throw	71.24 m
2024	European Championships	Rome, Italy	20th (q)	Hammer throw	72.85 m
