= Athletics at the 2022 Commonwealth Games – Men's hammer throw =

Men's hammer throw at the 2022 Commonwealth Games
- Venue: Alexander Stadium
- Dates: 6 August
- Competitors: 14 from 8 nations
- Winning distance: 76.43

Medalists
gold medal	Nick Miller	England
silver medal	Ethan Katzberg	Canada
bronze medal	Alexandros Poursanidis	Cyprus

The men's hammer throw at the 2022 Commonwealth Games, as part of the athletics programme, took place in the Alexander Stadium in Birmingham on 6 August 2022.

The winning margin was 7 cm which as of 2024 remains the only time the men's hammer throw was won by less than 10 cm at these games.

== Records ==
Prior to this competition, the existing world and Games records were as follows:

World record	Yuriy Sedykh (URS)	86.74 m	Stuttgart, West Germany	30 August 1986
Commonwealth record	Chris Harmse (RSA)	80.63 m	Durban, South Africa	15 April 2005
Games record	Nick Miller (ENG)	80.26 m	Gold Coast, Australia	8 April 2018

== Schedule ==
The schedule was as follows:

Date	Time	Round
Saturday 6 August 2022	11:48	Final

All times are British Summer Time (UTC+1)

== Results ==
=== Final ===
The medals were determined in the final.

Rank	Name	#1	#2	#3	#4	#5	#6	Result	Notes
1st place, gold medalist(s)	Nick Miller (ENG)	x	x	69.04	76.43	75.13	x	76.43	
2nd place, silver medalist(s)	Ethan Katzberg (CAN)	x	70.11	71.46	73.67	76.36	70.64	76.36	PB
3rd place, bronze medalist(s)	Alexandros Poursanidis (CYP)	x	x	69.17	71.11	73.04	73.97	73.97	SB
4	Joseph Ellis (ENG)	67.28	70.89	71.19	72.09	71.96	73.09	73.09	
5	Adam Keenan (CAN)	68.89	69.02	71.61	x	64.90	72.36	72.36	
6	Osian Jones (WAL)	68.88	x	x	69.15	x	68.50	69.15	
7	Tshepang Makhethe (RSA)	68.25	x	66.33	x	68.76	66.46	68.76	
8	Craig Murch (ENG)	60.54	66.19	68.42	67.68	66.46	x	68.42	
9	Rowan Hamilton (CAN)	x	64.32	67.76				67.76	
10	Mark Dry (SCO)	66.45	66.86	x				66.86	
11	Jac Palmer (WAL)	64.59	66.63	x				66.63	
12	Chris Bennett (SCO)	66.48	x	65.33				66.48	
13	Allan Cumming (RSA)	63.17	62.50	x				63.17	
14	Jackie Siew Cheer Wong (SGP)	61.40	x	61.25				61.40	
