= Sergey Litvinov (athlete, born 1986) =

Russian hammer thrower (born 1986)

Personal information
- Born: 27 January 1986 (age 40) Rostov-on-Don, Russia
- Height: 185 cm (6 ft 1 in)
- Weight: 100 kg (220 lb)

Sport
- Sport: Athletics
- Event: Hammer throw
- Coached by: Sergey Litvinov Sr.

Achievements and titles
- Personal best: 80.98 m (2012)
Medal record
Representing Russia
European Championships
Disqualified	2014 Zürich

Sergey Sergeyevich Litvinov (Russian: Сергей Сергеевич Литвинов, born 27 January 1986) is a hammer thrower. He was stripped of the bronze medal of the 2014 European Championship for doping. He currently competes for Russia, having previously represented Germany and Belarus.

== Career ==
Litvinov was coached by his father – two time world champion, Olympic champion and former world record holder Sergey Litvinov. He had no notable performances as a junior and was 12th in the IAAF world junior rankings in 2005 with a personal best of 72.14 m (6 kg hammer). The same year he threw 73.98 m with the 7.26 kg hammer, which placed him 57th on the senior world rankings. He finished ninth at the 2004 World Junior Championships in Athletics and 2005 European Athletics Junior Championships. Aged 21, he attended the 2007 European Athletics U23 Championships where he went in as favorite with a mark of 74.80 m set only a month earlier. He qualified as 4th with 69.04 m, but finished 11th in the final. He improved in 2009, finishing 5th at the world championships with a throw of 76.58 m. He missed the 2010 European Athletics Championships because of the transfer to the Russian team, and failed to reach the final at the 2011 World Championships, but later won bronze medals at the 2013 Summer Universiade and 2014 European Championships.

In 2022, all his results from 14 July 2012 until 25 February 2016 have been cancelled after he recognised have been doped to AIU.

== Competition record ==
Year	Competition	Venue	Position	Event	Notes
Representing Belarus
2004	World Junior Championships	Grosseto, Italy	9th	Hammer (6 kg)	67.11 m
2005	European Junior Championships	Kaunas, Lithuania	9th	Hammer (6 kg)	69.65 m
2007	European U23 Championships	Debrecen, Hungary	11th	Hammer	64.03 m
Representing Germany
2009	World Championships	Berlin, Germany	5th	Hammer	76.58 m
Representing Russia
2011	World Championships	Daegu, South Korea	15th (q)	Hammer	74.80 m
2013	Universiade	Kazan, Russia	3rd	Hammer	78.08 m (DQ)
2013	World Championships	Moscow, Russia	11th	Hammer	75.90 m (DQ)
2014	European Championships	Zürich, Switzerland	3rd	Hammer	79.35 m (DQ)
2015	World Championships	Beijing, China	5th	Hammer	77.24 m (DQ)
Competing as neutral
2017	World Championships	London, United Kingdom	17th (q)	Hammer	73.48 m

== Progression ==
Impl.	Year	Perf.	Date
7.26 kg	2010	78.98	30/05/2010
7.26 kg	2009	77.88	09/06/2009
7.26 kg	2008	75.35	17/05/2008
7.26 kg	2007	74.80	09/06/2007
7.26 kg	2006	66.72	06/07/2006
6 kg	2005	72.14	30/04/2005
6 kg	2004	71.09	13/06/2004
5 kg	2003	72.74	28/06/2003

== See also ==
- List of eligibility transfers in athletics
- List of hammer throwers
