= Marcel Lomnický =

Slovak hammer thrower

Personal information
- Born: 6 July 1987 (age 39) Nitra, Czechoslovakia
- Height: 1.77 m (5 ft 9 1/2 in)
- Weight: 106 kg (234 lb)

Sport
- Country: Slovakia
- Sport: Athletics
- Event: Hammer throw
- College team: Virginia Tech Hokies
Medal record
Men's athletics
Representing Slovakia
European Games
Gold medal – first place	2015 Baku	Mixed team
Universiade
Silver medal – second place	2011 Shenzhen	Hammer throw
Silver medal – second place	2013 Kazan	Hammer throw
- Updated on 14 August 2012

Marcel Lomnický (born 6 July 1987) is a Slovak hammer thrower. He competed for Slovakia at the 2012 Summer Olympics and 2016 Summer Olympics.

== Competition record ==
Year	Competition	Venue	Position	Event	Notes
Representing Slovakia
2004	World Junior Championships	Grosseto, Italy	17th (q)	Hammer throw (6 kg)	65.79 m
2005	European Junior Championships	Kaunas, Lithuania	8th	Hammer throw (6 kg)	70.49 m
2006	World Junior Championships	Beijing, China	3rd	Hammer throw (6 kg)	77.06 m
2007	European U23 Championships	Debrecen, Hungary	3rd	Hammer throw	72.17 m
2009	European U23 Championships	Kaunas, Lithuania	6th	Hammer throw	70.59 m
2009	Universiade	Belgrade, Serbia	8th	Hammer throw	70.37 m
2010	European Championships	Barcelona, Spain	24th (q)	Hammer throw	68.22 m
2011	Universiade	Shenzhen, China	2nd	Hammer throw	73.90 m
2011	World Championships	Daegu, South Korea	21st (q)	Hammer throw	72.68 m
2012	European Championships	Helsinki, Finland	11th	Hammer throw	73.41 m
2012	Olympic Games	London, United Kingdom	15th (q)	Hammer throw	74.00 m
2013	Universiade	Kazan, Russia	2nd	Hammer throw	78.73 m
2013	World Championships	Moscow, Russia	7th	Hammer throw	77.57 m
2014	European Championships	Zurich, Switzerland	7th	Hammer throw	76.89 m
2015	World Championships	Beijing, China	8th	Hammer throw	75.79 m
2016	European Championships	Amsterdam, Netherlands	5th	Hammer throw	75.84 m
2016	Olympic Games	Rio de Janeiro, Brazil	5th	Hammer throw	75.97 m
2017	World Championships	London, United Kingdom	13th (q)	Hammer throw	74.26 m
2018	European Championships	Berlin, Germany	11th	Hammer throw	72.74 m
2019	World Championships	Doha, Qatar	18th (q)	Hammer throw	73.51 m
2021	Olympic Games	Tokyo, Japan	24th (q)	Hammer throw	72.52 m
2024	European Championships	Rome, Italy	30th (q)	Hammer throw	68.15 m
