= 2007 European Athletics U23 Championships – Men's hammer throw =

The men's hammer throw event at the 2007 European Athletics U23 Championships was held in Debrecen, Hungary, at Gyulai István Atlétikai Stadion on 14 and 15 July.

== Medalists ==
Gold	Yury Shayunou; Belarus
Silver	Kristóf Németh; Hungary
Bronze	Marcel Lomnický; Slovakia

== Results ==
=== Final ===
15 July

Rank	Name	Nationality	Attempts						Result	Notes
Rank	Name	Nationality	1	2	3	4	5	6	Result	Notes
1st place, gold medalist(s)	Yury Shayunou	Belarus	74.92	x	71.36	71.50	x	x	74.92	
2nd place, silver medalist(s)	Kristóf Németh	Hungary	70.24	71.30	71.57	72.55	72.56	70.60	72.56	
3rd place, bronze medalist(s)	Marcel Lomnický	Slovakia	70.04	69.47	72.17	70.63	68.64	x	72.17	
4	Andrey Azarenkov	Russia	70.38	x	71.87	x	x	x	71.87	
5	Yevgeniy Aydamirov	Russia	64.95	68.13	x	x	69.62	71.20	71.20	
6	Oleksiy Sokyrskyy	Ukraine	70.20	69.79	70.63	x	69.66	x	70.63	
7	Anatoliy Pozdnyakov	Russia	69.39	65.37	68.54	x	x	x	69.39	
8	Juha Kauppinen	Finland	68.26	68.67	x	67.79	68.85	68.93	68.93	
9	Tuomas Seppänen	Finland	67.67	x	x				67.67	
10	Petri Mättölä	Finland	66.28	65.53	x				66.28	
11	Sergej Litvinov	Belarus	64.03	x	x				64.03	
12	Efthimios Katsikadamis	Greece	59.45	59.98	53.85				59.98	

=== Qualifications ===
14 July
Qualifying 67.00 or 12 best to the Final

Rank	Name	Nationality	Result	Notes
1	Yevgeniy Aydamirov	Russia	70.86	Q
2	Marcel Lomnický	Slovakia	69.89	Q
3	Yury Shayunou	Belarus	69.59	Q
4	Sergej Litvinov	Belarus	69.03	Q
5	Andrey Azarenkov	Russia	68.91	Q
6	Anatoliy Pozdnyakov	Russia	68.80	Q
7	Oleksiy Sokyrskyy	Ukraine	68.33	Q
8	Tuomas Seppänen	Finland	68.09	Q
9	Petri Mättölä	Finland	68.02	Q
10	Kristóf Németh	Hungary	67.85	Q
11	Juha Kauppinen	Finland	66.62	q
12	Efthimios Katsikadamis	Greece	64.55	q
13	Aurélien Boisrond	France	63.94	
14	Steffen Nerdal	Norway	62.91	
15	Matej Muža	Croatia	62.37	
16	Bergur Ingi Pétursson	Iceland	61.63	
17	Turgay Çabukel	Turkey	60.07	
	Konstadinos Stathelakos	Greece	NM	

== Participation ==
According to an unofficial count, 18 athletes from 12 countries participated in the event.

- Belarus (2)
- Croatia (1)
- Finland (3)
- France (1)
- Greece (2)
- Hungary (1)
- Iceland (1)
- Norway (1)
- Russia (3)
- Slovakia (1)
- Turkey (1)
- Ukraine (1)
