= Constantinos Stathelakos =

Cypriot track and field athlete (1987–2024)

Personal information
- Born: 30 December 1987 Lamia, Greece
- Died: 1 February 2024 (aged 36) South Africa
- Height: 1.78 m (5 ft 10 in)
- Weight: 130 kg (287 lb)

Sport
- Country: Cyprus
- Sport: Athletics
- Event: Hammer throw
- Updated on 14 August 2012

Constantinos Stathelakos (Greek: Κωνσταντίνος Σταθελάκος, Konstandinos Stathelakos; 30 December 1987 – 1 February 2024) was a Cypriot track and field athlete who competed in the hammer throw. He was born in Lamia, Greece and transferred his international eligibility to Cyprus after 2009. He competed in the hammer throw at the 2012 Summer Olympics for Cyprus.

Stathelakos died in a road traffic collision in South Africa, on 1 February 2024, at the age of 36.

== Competition record ==
Year	Competition	Venue	Position	Event	Notes
Representing Greece
2006	World Junior Championships	Beijing, China	22nd (q)	Hammer throw (6 kg)	64.47 m
2007	European U23 Championships	Debrecen, Hungary	–	Hammer throw	NM
2009	European U23 Championships	Kaunas, Lithuania	15th (q)	Hammer throw	64.99 m
Representing Cyprus
2012	European Championships	Helsinki, Finland	29th (q)	Hammer throw	68.20 m
2012	Olympic Games	London, United Kingdom	33rd (q)	Hammer throw	69.65 m
2013	Mediterranean Games	Mersin, Turkey	7th	Hammer throw	67.26 m
2014	Commonwealth Games	Glasgow, United Kingdom	7th	Hammer throw	68.22 m
2015	Universiade	Gwangju, South Korea	10th	Hammer throw	68.91 m
2016	European Championships	Amsterdam, Netherlands	22nd (q)	Hammer throw	70.20 m
2018	Commonwealth Games	Gold Coast, Australia	12th	Hammer throw	64.87 m
