= Athletics at the 2013 Summer Universiade – Men's hammer throw =

The men's hammer throw event at the 2013 Summer Universiade was held on 8 July.

== Medalists ==
Gold	Silver	Bronze
Paweł Fajdek; Poland	Marcel Lomnický; Slovakia	Sergej Litvinov; Russia

== Results ==
Rank	Athlete	Nationality	#1	#2	#3	#4	#5	#6	Result	Notes
1st place, gold medalist(s)	Paweł Fajdek	Poland	76.96	x	x	79.99	x	78.65	79.99	=SB
2nd place, silver medalist(s)	Marcel Lomnický	Slovakia	x	75.94	76.75	76.63	77.78	78.73	78.73	PB
DQ	Sergej Litvinov	Russia	75.89	x	78.08 (DQ)	x	x	75.23	78.08	
4	Yury Shayunou	Belarus	74.63	74.56	x	73.46	74.13	75.82	75.82	
5	Wojciech Nowicki	Poland	74.54	75.32	73.53	74.94	x	x	75.32	
6	Siarhei Kalamoyets	Belarus	71.52	73.30	71.78	73.14	74.18	73.34	74.18	
7	Tuomas Seppänen	Finland	x	x	72.95	72.86	73.89	70.70	73.89	
8	Serghei Marghiev	Moldova	x	71.93	x	x	x	72.99	72.99	SB
9	Anatoliy Pozdnyakov	Russia	x	71.20	x				71.20	
10	Alexander Ziegler	Germany	70.62	67.39	71.10				71.10	
11	Mergen Mammedov	Turkmenistan	67.26	x	69.78				69.78	
12	Alaa El-Din El-Ashry	Egypt	69.21	69.77	69.41				69.77	
13	Juha Kauppinen	Finland	x	67.76	x				67.76	
14	Amanmyrat Hommadov	Turkmenistan	63.26	x	64.28				64.28	
15	Jacobo Saldarriaga	Colombia	55.48	x	x				55.48	
	Edgars Gailis	Latvia	x	x	x				NM	
	Alexander Rose	Samoa							DNS	
