= Athletics at the 2009 Summer Universiade – Men's hammer throw =

The men's hammer throw event at the 2009 Summer Universiade was held on 7–8 July.

== Medalists ==
Gold	Silver	Bronze
Yury Shayunou; Belarus	James Steacy; Canada	Oleksiy Sokyrskyy; Ukraine

== Results ==
=== Qualification ===
Qualification: 74.00 m (Q) or at least 12 best (q) qualified for the final.

Rank	Group	Athlete	Nationality	#1	#2	#3	Result	Notes
1	B	Yury Shayunou	Belarus	x	71.31	73.74	73.74	q
2	B	James Steacy	Canada	73.52	–	–	73.52	q
3	B	Frédérick Pouzy	France	69.16	70.30	73.27	73.27	q
4	B	Dmitry Velikopolsky	Russia	71.57	71.70	70.33	71.70	q
5	A	Oleksiy Sokyrskyy	Ukraine	71.05	71.58	x	71.58	q
6	A	Sven Mohsner	Germany	70.55	70.91	68.91	70.91	q
7	B	Juha Kauppinen	Finland	69.13	68.87	70.18	70.18	q
8	B	Benjamin Siart	Austria	69.97	67.25	69.56	69.97	q
9	A	Mohsen El Anany	Egypt	67.65	68.12	69.70	69.70	q
10	A	Marcel Lomnický	Slovakia	66.43	68.19	69.53	69.53	q
11	B	Ainārs Vaičulēns	Latvia	68.86	x	63.63	68.86	q
12	A	Efthimios Katsikadamis	Greece	68.43	67.81	x	68.43	q
13	A	Denis Lukyanov	Russia	x	65.70	62.73	65.70	
14	B	Gong Jian	China	62.10	x	65.10	65.10	
15	A	Kaveh Mousavi	Iran	63.33	63.96	x	63.96	
16	A	Petros Sofianos	Cyprus	60.92	60.27	60.96	60.96	
17	A	Martin Vasilev	Bulgaria	57.79	60.20	59.30	60.20	
	B	Mostafa Abdul El-Moaty	Egypt				DNS	

=== Final ===
Rank	Athlete	Nationality	#1	#2	#3	#4	#5	#6	Result	Notes
1st place, gold medalist(s)	Yury Shayunou	Belarus	x	76.77	74.28	76.92	x	x	76.92	
2nd place, silver medalist(s)	James Steacy	Canada	72.67	74.60	71.26	73.01	72.27	74.88	74.88	SB
3rd place, bronze medalist(s)	Oleksiy Sokyrskyy	Ukraine	73.73	x	x	x	71.54	72.87	73.73	
4	Frédérick Pouzy	France	71.15	x	71.92	67.41	71.08	x	71.92	
5	Sven Mohsner	Germany	69.61	70.05	70.73	x	71.74	71.30	71.74	
6	Dmitry Velikopolsky	Russia	70.87	70.73	71.30	68.81	70.16	68.17	71.30	
7	Benjamin Siart	Austria	67.54	70.90	68.31	x	x	66.02	70.90	
8	Marcel Lomnický	Slovakia	68.05	68.59	70.37	69.16	x	68.17	70.37	
9	Juha Kauppinen	Finland	70.18	69.54	x				70.18	
10	Mohsen El Anany	Egypt	69.91	x	x				69.91	
11	Efthimios Katsikadamis	Greece	x	x	63.50				63.50	
12	Ainārs Vaičulēns	Latvia	x	62.92	–				62.92	
