= Athletics at the 2018 Commonwealth Games – Men's hammer throw =

Men's hammer throw at the 2018 Commonwealth Games
- Venue: Carrara Stadium
- Dates: 8 April
- Competitors: 16 from 11 nations
- Winning distance: 80.26 m GR

Medalists
gold medal	Nick Miller	England
silver medal	Matthew Denny	Australia
bronze medal	Mark Dry	Scotland

The men's hammer throw at the 2018 Commonwealth Games, as part of the athletics programme, took place in the Carrara Stadium in Queensland on 8 April 2018.

The winning margin was 5.38 metres which as of 2024 remains the only time the men's hammer throw has been won by more than 5 metres at these games.

== Records ==
Prior to this competition, the existing world and Games records were as follows:

World record	Yuriy Sedykh (URS)	86.74 m	Stuttgart, West Germany	30 August 1986
Games record	Stuart Rendell (AUS)	77.53 m	Melbourne, Australia	24 March 2006

== Schedule ==
The schedule was as follows:

Date	Time	Round
Sunday 8 April 2018	14:00	Final

All times are Australian Eastern Standard Time (UTC+10)

== Results ==
With sixteen entrants, the event was held as a straight final.

=== Final ===
Rank	Athlete	#1	#2	#3	#4	#5	#6	Result	Notes
1st place, gold medalist(s)	Nick Miller (ENG)	63.60	x	76.48	80.26	79.75	x	80.26	GR, NR^{[UK]}
2nd place, silver medalist(s)	Matthew Denny (AUS)	x	x	73.82	74.88	x	74.61	74.88	PB
3rd place, bronze medalist(s)	Mark Dry (SCO)	69.00	68.44	68.74	70.78	71.34	73.12	73.12	SB
4	Adam Keenan (CAN)	x	68.29	x	70.43	70.75	72.15	72.15	
5	Taylor Campbell (ENG)	71.69	x	x	71.18	72.03	71.46	72.03	
6	Dempsey McGuigan (NIR)	67.08	68.73	67.80	67.33	70.24	68.27	70.24	
7	Osian Jones (WAL)	69.44	70.14	x	68.79	69.44	x	70.14	
8	Jack Dalton (AUS)	x	68.28	x	62.96	x	66.34	68.28	=PB
9	Tshepang Makhethe (RSA)	67.05	67.99	x	—N/a			67.99	
10	Chris Bennett (SCO)	65.22	64.29	x	—N/a			65.22	
11	Huw Peacock (AUS)	64.68	x	65.19	—N/a			65.19	
12	Constantinos Stathelakos (CYP)	x	x	64.87	—N/a			64.87	
13	Canigia Raynor (JAM)	64.36	x	x	—N/a			64.36	
14	Jackie Siew Cheer Wong (MAS)	62.44	x	64.35	—N/a			64.35	
15	Alexandros Poursanidis (CYP)	x	x	63.86	—N/a			63.86	
16	Dominic Ondigi Abunda (KEN)	60.15	60.64	61.38	—N/a			61.38	NR

Note

- ^{^{UK}} Also a British record
