= Evgeny Aydamirov =

Russian hammer thrower

Evgeny Aydamirov (Russian: Евгений Айдамиров; born 11 May 1987 in Leningrad) is a male hammer thrower from Russia. His personal best throw is 74.92 metres, achieved in March 2010 in Adler. He held the junior world record with 82.62 metres with the 6 kg until Javier Cienfuegos beat it with an 82.96 toss in 2009.

== Achievements ==
Year	Competition	Venue	Position	Event	Notes
Representing Russia
2003	World Youth Championships	Sherbrooke, Quebec, Canada	4th	Hammer (5 kg)	72.76 m
2005	European Junior Championships	Kaunas, Lithuania	2nd	Hammer (6 kg)	76.73 m
2006	World Junior Championships	Beijing, PR China	1st	Hammer (6 kg)	78.42 m
2007	European U23 Championships	Debrecen, Hungary	5th	Hammer	71.20 m
2009	European U23 Championships	Kaunas, Lithuania	10th	Hammer	68.47 m
