= Jérôme Bortoluzzi =

French hammer thrower

Personal information
- Born: May 20, 1982 (age 44)
- Height: 1.82 m (5 ft 11 1/2 in)
- Weight: 110 kg (240 lb)

Sport
- Country: France
- Sport: Athletics
- Event: Hammer throw
- Updated on 14 August 2012

Jérôme Bortoluzzi (born 20 March 1982 in Amnéville) is a French athlete specialising in the hammer throw. He competed for France at the 2012 Summer Olympics.

Bortoluzzi was an All-American thrower for the SMU Mustangs track and field team, finishing 5th in the hammer throw at the 2004 NCAA Division I Outdoor Track and Field Championships.

His personal best in the event is 78.26 metres from 2012.

== Competition record ==
| Year | Competition | Venue | Position | Event | Notes |
Representing France
| 2009 | Mediterranean Games | Pescara, Italy | 2nd | Hammer throw | 73.73 m |
| 2009 | World Championships | Berlin, Germany | 19th (q) | Hammer throw | 73.09 m |
| 2009 | Jeux de la Francophonie | Beirut, Lebanon | 3rd | Hammer throw | 68.03 m |
| 2012 | European Championships | Helsinki, Finland | 8th | Hammer throw | 74.49 m |
| 2012 | Olympic Games | London, United Kingdom | 14th (q) | Hammer throw | 74.15 m |
| 2013 | Mediterranean Games | Mersin, Turkey | 5th | Hammer throw | 72.98 m |
| 2013 | Jeux de la Francophonie | Nice, France | 4th | Hammer throw | 72.04 m |
