= Alexandros Poursanidis =

Cypriot hammer thrower (born 1993)

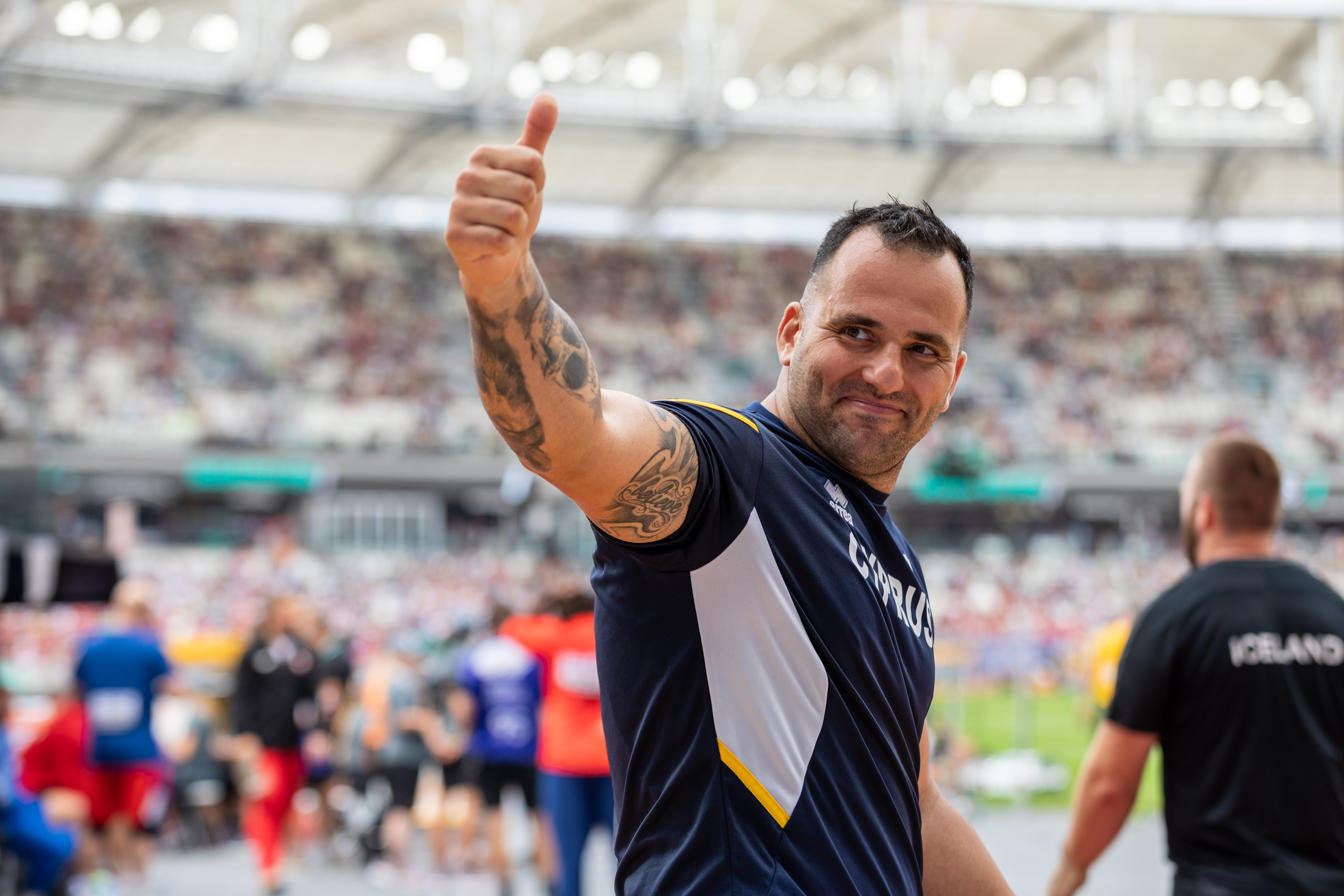

Personal information
- Born: 23 January 1993 (age 33)

Sport
- Country: Cypriot
- Sport: Athletics
- Event: Hammer throw
Medal record
Hammer throw
Representing Cyprus
Commonwealth Games
| Bronze medal – third place | 2022 Birmingham | Men's hammer throw |

Alexandros Poursanidis (Greek: Αλέξανδρος Πουρσανίδης; born 23 January 1993) is a Cypriot hammer thrower.

In age-specific categories he won the silver medal at the 2010 Youth Olympics and finished fourth at the 2012 World Junior Championships, eighth at the 2013 European U23 Championships and twelfth at the 2015 European U23 Championships.

He finished tenth at the 2014 Commonwealth Games, no-marked in the final at the 2017 Universiade, finished fifteenth at the 2018 Commonwealth Games. Won the European team cup league B in 2019 in Croatia with a mark of 71.06.

Won a bronze medal at the 2022 Commonwealth Games in Birmingham.

Won silver medal in the Mediterranean Games in Algeria in 2022.

Placed 27th in the World Championships in Budapest.

His personal best throw is 74.97 meters, achieved at National Championships in June 2024.
