= Kristóf Németh =

Hungarian hammer thrower

Kristóf Németh (born 17 September 1987 in Szombathely) is a Hungarian male hammer thrower.

== Achievements ==
Year	Competition	Venue	Position	Event	Notes
Representing Hungary
2003	World Youth Championships	Sherbrooke, Canada	2nd	Hammer throw (5 kg)	75.59
2004	World Junior Championships	Grosseto, Italy	4th	Hammer (6 kg)	71.40 m
2006	World Junior Championships	Beijing, China	2nd	Hammer throw (6 kg)	78.39 m
2007	European U23 Championships	Debrecen, Hungary	2nd	Hammer throw	72.56 m
2009	European U23 Championships	Kaunas, Lithuania	4th	Hammer	71.85 m
2010	European Championships	Barcelona, Spain	9th	Hammer throw	73.93
2012	European Championships	Helsinki, Finland	16th (q)	Hammer throw	72.46
2014	European Championships	Zürich, Switzerland	14th (q)	Hammer throw	73.33
