= Pike County shootings =

American mass shooting in 2016

Pike County Massacre
- Part of mass shootings in the United States
- Location of Pike County within the U.S. state of Ohio
- Date: April 21–22, 2016
- Location: Pike County, Ohio, United States
- Type: Spree shooting, mass murder, familicide, mass shooting
- Deaths: 8
- Injuries: 0
- Accused: George "Billy" Wagner III
- Convicted: Rita Newcomb; Edward "Jake" Wagner; Angela Wagner; George Wagner IV
- Convictions: Rita Newcomb: Obstructing official business; Edward "Jake" Wagner: 8 counts of aggravated murder and felony conspiracy; unlawful sexual conduct with a minor; other charges; Angela Wagner: Conspiracy to commit aggravated murder; other charges; George Wagner IV: 8 counts of aggravated murder and conspiracy
- Sentence: Rita Newcomb: 5 years of adult supervision; Edward "Jake" Wagner: Life imprisonment (8 consecutive terms); Angela Wagner: 30 years imprisonment; George Wagner IV: Life imprisonment (8 consecutive terms + 121 years)

The Pike County Shootings, also known as the Pike County Massacre, occurred on the night of April 21–22, 2016, when eight people – all belonging to the Rhoden family – were shot and killed in four homes in Sunfish Township in Pike County, Ohio, 50 miles (80 km) from Columbus and 60 miles (97 km) from Cincinnati. Their bodies were found later on April 22. Seven of the victims – six adults and a 16-year-old boy – were discovered to have been shot execution-style in three adjacent houses, while the eighth victim, an adult male, was found shot to death in his camper in nearby Piketon. Three young children, including two infants, were physically unharmed. At least two shooters were initially believed to be responsible.

Investigators believe the murders were premeditated, and that the perpetrators were known to the Rhoden family. On April 25, the Ohio Attorney General's office confirmed the presence of marijuana cultivation and cockfighting operations at some of the crime scenes, but did not confirm a direct connection to the killings. The ensuing investigation soon became the largest in Ohio's history.

In November 2018, four members of the Wagner family, who were known to the Rhodens, were arrested in Ohio and Kentucky, and charged in the eight murders. Edward "Jake" Wagner, an ex-boyfriend of victim Hanna Rhoden, and father of her three-year-old daughter pleaded guilty to all eight murders; he later testified that he shot five of the eight victims.

== Events ==
The bodies were first discovered on April 22, 2016, after Bobby Jo Manley, a sister of victim Dana Rhoden, came to feed pets at the homes. Police were first alerted after receiving a 9-1-1 call about two bodies inside a home on Union Hill Road, at 7:51 a.m. EDT. Before the police arrived, Manley discovered two more bodies in a second trailer on the property. Her brother, James Manley, went to check on their sister Dana, and discovered a third crime scene, where the police found three more victims when they arrived. At 1:26 p.m., a 9-1-1 call reported an eighth body, an adult male, at a fourth residence in the nearby village of Piketon.

Three young children—ages three years, six months, and four days—were unharmed during the shootings, with the four-day-old being found in bed with her mother's body. Seven adults and a 16-year-old were among those slain. The four-day-old and the six-month-old were placed under protective services, and the three-year-old was put under the guardianship of his mother, who was not involved in the shootings.

Three weapons were used in the shootings: a 7.62×39mm SKS semi-automatic rifle, a .40-caliber Glock 22 Gen 2 semi-automatic pistol, and a Walther Colt 1911 .22-caliber pistol.

== Victims ==
The eight victims were identified as:

Name	Age	Relationship	Cause of death
Christopher Rhoden Jr.	16	Youngest son of Dana and Christopher Rhoden Sr.	Gunshot wounds to the head
Christopher Rhoden Sr.	40	Ex-husband of Dana Rhoden	Gunshot wounds to the head, torso, and limbs
Clarence "Frankie" Rhoden	20	Eldest son of Dana and Christopher Rhoden Sr. Father of the surviving 6-month-old and 3-year-old	Gunshot wounds to the head
Dana Lynn (née Manley) Rhoden	37	Ex-wife of Christopher Rhoden Sr.	Gunshot wounds to the head and neck
Gary Rhoden	38	Cousin of Christopher Sr. and Kenneth Rhoden	Gunshot wounds to the head
Hanna May Rhoden	19	Daughter of Dana and Christopher Rhoden Sr.; mother of the surviving 3-day-old infant (and of another, 2.5-year-old-child, who was with a relative elsewhere on the night. (Note: Hanna Rhoden's two-and-a-half- or three-year-old daughter, the child of her past relationship with Edward "Jake" Wagner, was not present in the home that night. The prosecution case was that Jake's and the Wagner family's desire for unencumbered custody of this child was the motive for the murders.))	Gunshot wounds to the head
Hannah Hazel Gilley	20	Fiancée of Clarence Rhoden; mother of the surviving 6-month-old child	Gunshot wounds to the head
Kenneth Rhoden	44	Brother of Christopher Rhoden Sr.	Single gunshot wound to the head

=== Autopsies ===
The bodies of the victims were taken to the Hamilton County Coroner's Office in Cincinnati, where autopsies found that all but one of the victims were shot multiple times. Four of the victims were shot once, twice, or three times; one was shot four times; two were shot five times; and the eighth suffered a total of nine gunshot wounds. Death certificates released on May 28 clarified that six of the eight victims were shot in the head only; Christopher Rhoden Sr. suffered gunshot wounds to the head, torso and limbs, and Dana was shot in the head and neck. Bruising was also found on some of the bodies, indicating some of the victims were beaten as well. Some of the victims were found shot in their beds. From the number of gunshot wounds on the victims' bodies, an estimated total of 32 shots were fired during the killings.

==== Autopsy report released ====
The offices of the county coroner and the Ohio Attorney General announced that the full final autopsy reports would not be released to the public, citing security concerns. On July 22, 2016, The Cincinnati Enquirer filed a lawsuit against the Pike County Coroner's Office, asking for the full autopsy records of the victims. On August 12, 2016, a similar lawsuit was filed by The Columbus Dispatch. In both cases, Ohio Attorney General Mike DeWine called for mediation, which attracted criticism and accusations that it was merely a delay tactic. A lawyer representing both newspapers said there was no legal basis for law enforcement's withholding of information from the public.

In a filing on September 6, 2016, DeWine responded to The Columbus Dispatch's lawsuit against the coroner's office, saying:

Public release of information known only to law enforcement and the killer(s) directly threatens the success of the investigation. Among other consequences, releasing this type of information impedes investigators' ability to separate genuine leads from fake, which wastes resources; makes it difficult to analyze confessions, which are fact-checked against information known only by investigators; and devalues information provided by witnesses who come forward after public release.

Amid lawsuits by media outlets, the coroner's office released heavily redacted versions of the final reports on September 23, 2016. The Fourth District Court of Appeals denied the Enquirer's request for an unredacted copy of the autopsy report on March 17, 2017. On September 19, 2018, the Ohio Supreme Court overturned a lower court's refusal to release the autopsy reports and the full autopsy reports were then publicly released.

=== Funeral services ===
On April 28, Gary Rhoden was the first of the victims to be buried, with his funeral proceedings being held in South Shore, Kentucky. Hannah Hazel Gilley was the next to be buried, on May 1, at Otway, Ohio. Funerals for the remaining victims took place on May 3 at West Portsmouth, where there was a high level of security. Ohio Attorney General Mike DeWine approved more than $20,000 to help pay for the funerals.

== Reactions ==
Ohio Governor and 2016 U.S. presidential candidate John Kasich, who was briefed on the killings, described them as "tragic beyond comprehension".

Cincinnati-area businessman Jeff Ruby offered a reward of $25,000 for information leading to the arrest and conviction of anyone involved in the shootings. On April 28, 2016, Ruby withdrew his reward, citing "recent complex criminal developments" in a post on Twitter. A reward of $10,000 from the Southern Ohio Crime Stoppers fund was authorized on May 10, but not announced by authorities until ten weeks later on July 21 due to a "miscommunication and a misunderstanding" about public notification.

== Investigation ==
=== Early stages ===
Police believed that more than one shooter was responsible for the killings, since two of the crime scenes were within walking distance, a third located about a mile away, and the fourth about eight miles away. Investigators briefly considered the possibility of a murder–suicide, but it was discredited as none of the victims' deaths appeared to be suicides. Attorney General DeWine stated that the killings were planned, premeditated, and "a sophisticated operation," citing the efforts taken by the shooter or shooters to cover up their tracks and remove any incriminating forensic evidence.

All of the victims were members of the Rhoden family. Surviving family members were urged by police to take precautions, and all residents of Peebles were advised to stay inside their homes the following night. An investigative task force of at least 100 members, led by the Ohio Bureau of Criminal Identification and Investigation (BCI), was assembled. More than 251 law enforcement officials were involved in the investigation overall, and sheriffs from 25 offices across Ohio offered to provide resources to Pike County. The Federal Bureau of Investigation and the Drug Enforcement Administration provided technical expertise to DeWine's office.

At least five search warrants were executed, and more than 50 people were interviewed in connection with the killings. Seventy-nine pieces of evidence were examined, including a Facebook threat aimed at Christopher Rhoden Jr., which was posted before the shootings.

=== Discovery of cannabis and cockfighting operations ===
On April 25, a spokesperson for DeWine's office also confirmed that cannabis was discovered at the three crime scenes on Union Hill Road, including an indoor grow house in which hundreds of cannabis plants were being grown, as well as chickens and equipment consistent with breeding chickens for cockfighting. An estimated total of 200 cannabis plants were recovered from the crime scenes and are believed to have been grown for sale and not for personal use. It was not known whether the cannabis was connected to the shootings, though investigators confirmed the possibility of the involvement of a Mexican drug cartel.

Cannabis cultivation is a common occurrence in Pike County: in 2010, 22,000 cannabis plants were seized by authorities in Latham, 15 miles (24 km) west of Piketon; and a major cannabis growth site was discovered by police in August 2012, with about 1,200 cannabis plants being destroyed by investigators. In both cases, police suspected connections to Mexican drug cartels.

On April 26, Dana Rhoden's father, Leonard Manley, stated that the victims knew their killer(s), citing the presence of Dana's two protective dogs. There was no indication that the dogs tried to attack anyone during the shootings, and there were no signs of forced entry at any of the crime scenes. Manley, who was not involved in the shootings, also said his daughter had no involvement in the exposed cannabis operations, saying that "they are trying to drag my daughter through the mud, and I don't appreciate that."

Some family members have acknowledged brothers Kenneth and Christopher Rhoden Sr. growing cannabis, but added that they were unaware of any high-volume cultivation occurring.

=== Seizure of victims' properties ===
On May 3, following the funerals of the last six victims, authorities towed away at least three vehicles from property belonging to the Rhoden family; a spokeswoman for Mike DeWine said they were towed "as part of the investigation". Additional vehicles were towed the next day as well. They were all dropped off at the base of operations set up by the investigative task force. As of May 12, more than 500 tips had been submitted and 128 interviews were conducted.

On May 12, DeWine and Pike County Sheriff Charles Reader announced the state's intention to relocate the mobile homes where the killings occurred to a secure location, in order to preserve evidence and protect the personal effects of the Rhoden family. Three of the homes were taken to a property in Waverly, where the investigative task force set up their command center, while the fourth would arrive later due to complications in removing it.

As of October 6, the homes were being stored in a warehouse that was once part of a chemical processing company. On November 24, dozens of family vehicles and farming equipment, which were seized and investigated earlier in May, were returned to the victims' relatives.

=== August 2016–January 2017 developments ===
On August 4, during a court hearing relating to the custody of the 6-month-old and 4-day-old children left alive, Sheriff Charles Reader confirmed investigators' early suspicions that more than one shooter was involved in the killings. He also said that the two children remained in "grave danger" because of the investigation, and that the investigation was possibly the largest in the BCI's history.

On August 13, KVIA-TV incorrectly reported that two men arrested in Hatch, New Mexico, for the shooting death of a police officer were also suspected in the Rhoden familicide. The men, in reality, were suspected of another shooting death in Londonderry, Ross County, Ohio. DeWine and Pike County Sheriff Charles S. Reader issued a statement saying that they were unaware of a link between the case and the New Mexico arrests, that there was no evidence confirming it, and that New Mexico authorities had not contacted them about a suspected connection. KVIA later retracted the error.

On August 20, DeWine announced new information regarding the investigation. He confirmed family and community members' suspicions that the perpetrators were familiar with the victims, their homes, and the surrounding area. He also announced that the U.S. Department of Homeland Security and other federal agencies had become involved with the investigation. In addition, DeWine speculated that residents in the area have more knowledge than what they are sharing with investigators.

On August 23, officials in Kenton County, Kentucky, located about 100 miles (160 km) from Pike County, reported similarities between the Ohio shootings and a double homicide in Kenton County that occurred two weeks before. The victims, a well-known drug dealer and his girlfriend, were found fatally shot execution-style in their bed. The uncaught Kenton County killers, who were believed to be familiar with the victims' home, also left any children in the house unharmed. A total of 770 tips had been submitted to investigators as of September 23, according to court documents released on October 7.

On September 28, WXIX-TV reported that the Rhoden family houses, all seized by the state as part of the investigation, were not being guarded properly. A news team had spent six weeks, starting from August 14 and ending in late September, watching the warehouse. Their surveillance reportedly turned up an absence of uniformed officers guarding the building, as well as a lack of security cameras and an unlocked, open main gate. DeWine responded to the claims, calling them "ludicrous" and asserting that the evidence was preserved and is not compromised. Reacting to the report, a former prosecutor from Hamilton County criticized the inadequate security measures and said, "Any evidence that they would pull out of that thing would be virtually useless."

On October 1, DeWine said that investigators were getting leads in the case and that the state had enough physical evidence for prosecution. He also appealed to the public, explaining that there are people who know more about the shootings.

On November 14, Pike County Sheriff Charles Reader issued a statement urging people with knowledge of the killings to come forward. He followed up with a second statement threatening to arrest anyone who may be obstructing the investigation, including relatives, family friends, and neighbors. Reacting to the second statement, Dana Rhoden's father, Leonard Manley, said that he "held nothing back" during the investigation. Following his reelection to the position of sheriff, Reader reiterated this belief and added that people may be scared of providing information.

On January 20, 2017, DeWine, on behalf of the Ohio Victims of Crime Compensation Program, denied a request by family member David Weisel to recover lost compensation related to the massacre.

=== Wagner family ===
On May 12, 2017, a SWAT team from the Franklin County Sheriff's Office raided a Pike County home approximately 10 miles from the site of the murders. Police originally stated they were searching for suspects in the murders; however, it was later clarified they were looking for evidence in the case and not suspects. Police also searched an Adams County property once owned and recently sold by Edward "Jake" Wagner, an ex-boyfriend of victim Hanna Rhoden and father of her 3-year-old daughter, but not the father of her 4-day-old daughter who was unharmed during the killings. Rhoden was only 13 years old when their sexual relationship began.

On June 20, 2017, Ohio police announced that they were seeking additional information on Jake Wagner, as well as his parents Billy and Angela and brother George. The family was living in Alaska at that time and police wanted to learn of interactions that members of the public had with the family, specifically conversations pertaining to vehicles, firearms and ammunition.

== Arrests ==
On November 13, 2018, Ohio Attorney General Mike DeWine announced that George "Billy" Wagner and Angela Wagner and their sons, Edward (known as "Jake") and George, had been arrested and charged with planning and carrying out the murders. The suspects were all members of the Wagner-Newcomb family from South Webster:

- George Wagner III ("Billy"), 47, was arrested in Lexington, Kentucky
- Angela Wagner, 48, was arrested at her home in Scioto County
- George Wagner IV, 27, was arrested during a traffic stop in Ross County
- Edward "Jake" Wagner, 26, was arrested along with his brother during a traffic stop in Ross County

Also arrested were the mother of Angela Wagner, Rita Newcomb, 65, of South Webster, and Fredericka Wagner, the mother of Billy Wagner. They were charged with perjury and obstructing justice for allegedly misleading investigators; Newcomb also was charged with forging custody documents to cover up the crimes. Charges against Fredericka Wagner were dismissed.

== Legal proceedings ==
- Rita Newcomb
  Charges: Obstructing official business
  On December 2, 2019, Newcomb pleaded guilty to a lesser charge of obstructing the investigation of the April 2016 homicides. In exchange, prosecutors dropped the forgery, obstruction of justice and perjury charges against her. Newcomb agreed to cooperate with prosecutors. In January 2025, she was sentenced to five years of adult supervision and a $753 fine, and she could spend 83 days in jail if she violates supervision rules.
- Fredericka Wagner
  The charges against Fredericka Wagner were dropped in June 2019.
- Edward Jacob "Jake" Wagner
  - Charges: Eight counts of aggravated murder
  - felony conspiracy
  - four counts of aggravated burglary
  - unlawful possession of a dangerous ordnance
  - multiple counts of tampering with evidence
  - forgery
  - unauthorized use of property
  - interception of wire and oral communications
  - obstruction of justice
  - engaging in a pattern of corrupt activity
  - unlawful sexual conduct with a minor
  On April 21, 2021, five years to the day that the eight members of the Rhoden family were found dead, Wagner pleaded guilty to all proffered charges. The State of Ohio agreed, as part of the guilty plea, not to seek the death penalty for him, his father, mother, or older brother. Families of the victims agreed to the plea deal, according to prosecutors. As part of the deal, Wagner, who admitted to shooting five of the eight victims, agreed to cooperate with prosecutors and testify against his family members. In September 2021, he was sentenced to eight consecutive life sentences with the possibility of parole after 32 years.
- Angela Wagner
  - Charges: Conspiracy to commit aggravated murder
  - several counts of aggravated burglary
  - tampering with evidence
  - possession of firearms
  - forgery
  - obstructing justice
  - engaging in a pattern of corrupt activity
  On September 10, 2021, Angela Wagner pleaded guilty to all charges arrived at, as part of a plea deal. The original eight counts of aggravated murder were dismissed.
- George W. Wagner IV
  - Charges: Eight counts of aggravated murder
  - tampering with evidence
  - conspiracy
  On September 12, 2022, the trial for George W. Wagner IV started, in Pike County. The main jury consisted of nine women and three men; the six alternates were five women and one man. This was an unusually large number of alternates given the trial had been expected to take up to six to eight weeks. George was found guilty on all counts and sentenced to life without parole. He was moved to Rhode Island as part of an interstate compact in 2023. During their opening statements, prosecutors said the guns used to kill the family were placed in buckets of concrete and gifted to a member of the Wagner family on Father's Day as boat anchors. Unbeknownst to the family member, the anchors contained the murder weapons. Later, the anchors were cut from a rope on the boat and dropped in a pond. Jake Wagner confessed that they were at the bottom of the pond, and after obtaining a search warrant, the state found the anchors in the water. They chipped away the concrete and found the murder weapons inside; the weapons matched the shell casing markings found at the murder scenes.
- George W. Wagner III ("Billy" )
  - Charges: Eight counts of aggravated homicide
  - fourteen related charges
  As of June 2025, a trial date for George "Billy" Wagner had not been set. Attorneys for the victims' families have argued against a previous ruling to move the trial on the basis that Wagner could not get a fair trial in Pike County; Rhoden family attorneys say the change of venue will cause the victims' relatives unnecessary hardship. The prosecution have lodged an appeal against an earlier ruling that Billy Wagner would not face the death penalty. On October 14, 2026 it was announced that the new venue for Wagner's trial would be the Seneca County courthouse in Tiffin, Ohio.

== See also ==
- Crime in Ohio
