= Ashok Tiwari =

Indian politician

Mayor of Varanasi
- Incumbent
- Assumed office 2023

Personal details
- Party: Bharatiya Janata Party

Ashok Tiwari is an Indian politician from Uttar Pradesh and a member of the Bharatiya Janata Party. He was elected as the Mayor of Varanasi in the 2023 Uttar Pradesh municipal elections.

== Political career ==
Tiwari contested the 2023 Uttar Pradesh municipal elections as a candidate of the Bharatiya Janata Party (BJP) and won the mayoral seat of Varanasi.
