= James Campbell (javelin thrower) =

British athlete (born 1988)

Personal information
- Nationality: British
- Born: 1 April 1988 (age 38) Cheltenham, England

Sport
- Sport: Athletics
- Event: Javelin throw
- Club: Cheltenham AC

James Edward Campbell (born 1 April 1988) is an English born, Scottish former track and field athlete.

== Biography ==
Campbell won the gold medal in the 2004 Commonwealth Youth Games, and was recognised as Scotland's athlete of the Games. He set the Scottish record in the javelin throw in 2006, throwing for a distance of 73.18 metres (240.1 ft) at the World Junior Championships in Beijing, ranking him 8th (junior) in the world.

In 2009 Campbell improved his lifetime best to 76.71 to set his 3rd national record of his career.

He became the British javelin throw champion after winning the British Athletics Championships in 2010. Shortly afterwards at the Commonwealth Games trials, Campbell became only the 10th Briton and 3rd British Under 23 to ever throw over 80m recording a new Scottish National Record and a lifetime best of 80.38.
