= Mikko Järvinen =

Finnish politician (1895–1953)

Mikko Järvinen (20 September 1895 – 30 April 1953; original surname Kuorrejärvi) was a Finnish politician, born in Kangasala. He was a member of the Parliament of Finland from 1945 until his death in 1953, representing the Finnish People's Democratic League (SKDL). He was a presidential elector in the 1950 Finnish presidential election. Järvinen was a member of the Communist Party of Finland (SKP). He joined the party in 1926, when it was still illegal in Finland. He was imprisoned for a while in the 1930s for his political activities. The SKP was eventually legalized as a result of the Moscow Armistice of 19 September 1944, six months before Järvinen was elected as a Member of Parliament.
