= Valeriy Sviatokha =

Belarusian hammer thrower

Personal information
- Born: July 20, 1981 (age 44) Grodno, Byelorussian SSR, Soviet Union
- Height: 1.88 m (6 ft 2 in)
- Weight: 116 kg (256 lb)

Sport
- Country: Belarus
- Sport: Athletics
- Event: Hammer throw
- Updated on 14 August 2012

Valeriy Vitalevich Sviatokha (Belarusian: Валеры Віталевіч Сьвятоха; born 20 July 1981) is a Belarusian hammer thrower. His personal best throw is 81.49 metres, achieved in May 2006 in Brest.

He won the bronze medal at the 2005 Summer Universiade. He also competed at the 2008 Olympic Games without reaching the final. When he took part in the 2012 Summer Olympics he reached the final, finishing in 11th place.

== Achievements ==
Year	Competition	Venue	Position	Notes
Representing Belarus
2003	European U23 Championships	Bydgoszcz, Poland	4th	70.28 m
2008	Olympic Games	Beijing, PR China	17th	74.41 m
2010	European Championships	Barcelona, Spain	4th	78.20 m
2012	Olympic Games	London, Great Britain	11th	73.13 m
