= Mikhail Levin =

Russian footballer

Personal information
- Full name: Mikhail Vyacheslavovich Levin
- Date of birth: 19 April 1969 (age 57)
- Height: 1.78 m (5 ft 10 in)
- Positions: Forward; midfielder

Youth career
- PFC CSKA Moscow

Senior career*
Years	Team	Apps	(Gls)
1986–1989	PFC CSKA Moscow	16	(1)
1986	→ PFC CSKA-2 Moscow (loan)	27	(1)
1988–1989	→ FC Chayka-CSKA-2 Moscow (loan)	15	(0)
1989	FC Krystal Kherson	13	(0)
1989	FC Nistru Chişinău	9	(2)
1990	Navbahor Namangan	42	(9)
1991–1994	FC Zenit Saint Petersburg	131	(6)
1994	→ FC Zenit-d Saint Petersburg	1	(0)
1995	FC Gazovik-Gazprom Izhevsk	36	(6)
1996	FC Amkar Perm	17	(4)
1997	FC Spartak-Orekhovo Orekhovo-Zuyevo	8	(0)
1997	FC Khimik Saint Petersburg		
1998	FC Kuzbass Kemerovo	10	(0)
1999	Foshan Fosti		
2000	FC Ladoga Kirovsk		
2001	FC Ladoga Vsevolozhsk		
- * Club domestic league appearances and goals

Mikhail Vyacheslavovich Levin (Russian: Михаил Вячеславович Левин; born 19 April 1969) is a former Russian football player.
