= 2005 European Athletics Junior Championships =

- Dates: 21–24 July
- Host city: Kaunas, Lithuania
- Venue: Darius and Girėnas Stadium
- Level: Under 20
- Events: 44
- Records set: 1 WJR, 5 CRs

The 2005 European Athletics Junior Championships was the 18th edition of the biennial athletics competition for European under-20 athletes, which was held in Kaunas, Lithuania on 21–24 July.

== Medal summary ==
=== Men ===
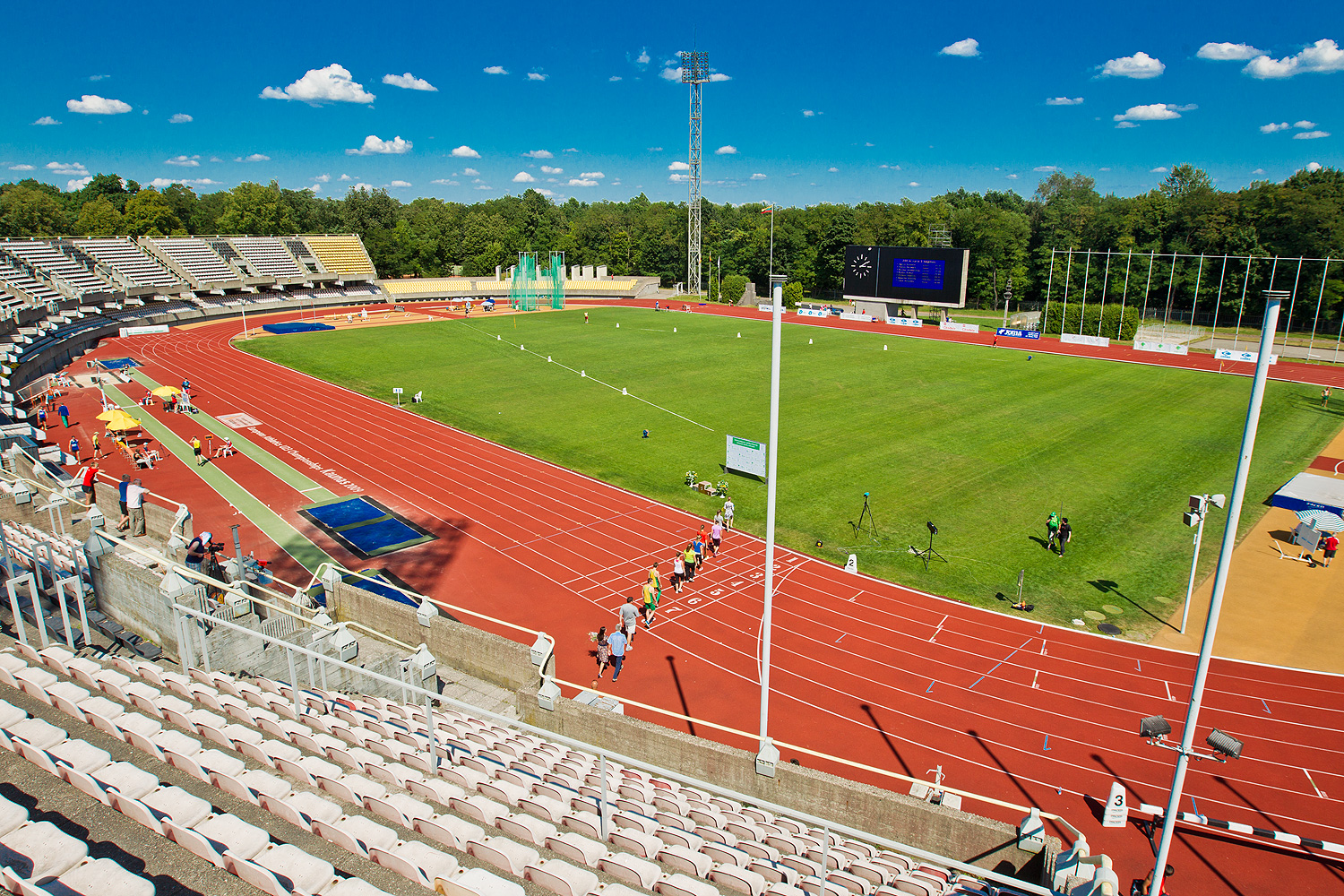
Host stadium in Kaunas.

Event	Gold		Silver		Bronze	
100 metres	Craig Pickering; Great Britain	10.51	Simeon Williamson; Great Britain	10.52	Alexander Nelson; Great Britain	10.60
200 metres	Daniel Schnelting; Germany	21.12	Julian Thomas; Great Britain	21.17	Wade Bennett-Jackson; Great Britain	21.41
400 metres	Željko Vincek; Croatia	46.14	Martyn Rooney; Great Britain	46.56	Dimítrios Régas; Greece	46.79 PB
800 metres	Mattias Claesson; Sweden	1:49.58	Lukas Rifesser; Italy	1:50.79	Steve Fennell; Great Britain	1:50.85
1500 metres	Colin Costello; Ireland	3:45.25 PB	Danny Darcy; Ireland	3:46.07	Adrian Danilewicz; Poland	3:47.22 (SB)
5000 metres	Barnabás Bene; Hungary	14:22.30	Dušan Markešević; Serbia and Montenegro	14:24.04 PB	László Tóth; Hungary	14:25.46
10,000 metres	Mugdat Öztürk; Turkey	30:10.60 PB	Stepan Rogovtsev; Belarus	30:12.76 PB	Carlos Gazapo; Spain	30:24.18
110 metres hurdles	Garfield Darien; France	13.77	Konstadinos Douvalidis; Greece	13.99	Alexander John; Germany	14.10
400 metres hurdles	Milan Kotur; Croatia	50.15 NJR	Dai Greene; Great Britain	51.14 PB	Fadil Bellaabouss; France	51.31
3000 metres steeplechase	Marcin Chabowski; Poland	8:40.88 CR	Albert Minczér; Hungary	8:45.82 PB	Andrzej Pasternak; Poland	8:52.31 PB
4 × 100 metres relay	Germany; Marius Sewald; Christian Blum; Nils Müller; Daniel Schnelting	39.90	Poland; Mikołaj Lewański; Dariusz Kuć; Radosław Drapała; Karol Sienkiewicz	40.03	Finland; Teemu Vilén; Visa Hongisto; Timo Salonen; Niko Viiala	40.29 NJR
4 × 400 metres relay	United Kingdom; Richard Buck; Set Osho; Richard Strachan; Martyn Rooney	3:06.67	Russia; Aleksandr Sigalovskiy; Dmitriy Buryak; Anton Kokorin; Artyom Sergiyenkov	3:07.19 NJR	Poland; Patryk Baranowski; Paweł Dobek; Ziemowit Ryś; Kacper Kozłowski	3:09.75
10,000 m walk (track)	Andrey Ruzavin; Russia	39:28.45 CR	Aleksandr Prokhorov; Russia	40:43.67 PB	Giorgio Rubino; Italy	40:46.95 PB
High jump	Ivan Ukhov; Russia	2.23 m	Wojciech Theiner; Poland	2.21 m	Niki Palli; Israel	2.19 m
Pole vault	Dmitriy Starodubtsev; Russia	5.50 m	Konstadinos Filippidis; Greece	5.45 m	Mikhail Golovtsov; Russia	5.45 m
Long jump	Greg Rutherford; Great Britain	8.14 m NJR	Sebastian Bayer; Germany	7.73 m	Mihail Mertzanidis-Despoteris; Greece	7.63 m
Triple jump	Stevens Marie-Sainte; France	16.29 m	Zhivko Petkov; Bulgaria	15.98 m	Dmitriy Nikonov; Russia	15.84 m
Shot put (6 kg)	Remigius Machura, Jr. Czech Republic	20.09 m NJR	Lajos Kürthy; Hungary	19.65 m	Maksim Sidorov; Russia	19.32 m
Discus throw (1.75 kg)	Margus Hunt; Estonia	62.19 m CR, NJR	Lajos Kürthy; Hungary	59.75 m	Martin Wierig; Germany	59.04 m
Hammer throw (6 kg)	Kristóf Németh; Hungary	78.85 m CR	Yevgeniy Aydamirov; Russia	76.73 m	Yury Shayunou; Belarus	74.78 m
Javelin throw (800 g)	Ioannis-Georgios Smalios; Greece	77.25 m	Alexander Vieweg; Germany	75.85 m	Ari Mannio; Finland	72.47 m
Decathlon (junior implements)	Andrei Krauchanka (BLR)	7997 pts	Arthur Abele (GER)	7634 pts	Mauri Kaattari (FIN)	7427 pts

=== Women ===
Event	Gold		Silver		Bronze	
100 metres	Iwona Brzezińska; Poland	11.67 PB	Lina Grinčikaitė; Lithuania	11.69	Eleni Artymata; Cyprus	11.74
200 metres	Yuliya Chermoshanskaya; Russia	23.21	Jala Gangnus; Germany	23.57	Angela Moroșanu; Romania	23.71
400 metres	Danijela Grgić; Croatia	52.42	Ksenia Zadorina; Russia	53.39	Angela Moroșanu; Romania	53.48
800 metres	Nataliia Lupu; Ukraine	2:02.78 PB	Mariya Shapayeva; Russia	2:03.00	Olga Cristea; Moldova	2:03.08
1500 metres	Morag McLarty; United Kingdom	4:15.12 PB	Yekaterina Martynova; Russia	4:15.46 PB	Azra Eminovic; Serbia and Montenegro	4:15.77 PB
3000 metres	Adelina De Soccio (ITA)	9:20.89	Susan Kuijken (NED)	9:28.45	Barbara Maveau (BEL)	9:29.78
5000 metres	Emily Pidgeon (GBR)	16:14.71	Tatyana Azorkina (RUS)	16:18.60	Svetlana Kudelich (BLR)	16:33.07
100 metres hurdles	Eline Berings (BEL)	13.41	Christina Vukicevic (NOR)	13.56	Cindy Billaud (FRA)	13.65
400 metres hurdles	Zuzana Hejnová (CZE)	55.89	Yekaterina Kostetskaya (RUS)	55.89	Yuliya Bychkova (RUS)	58.12
3000 metres steeplechase	Polina Jelizarova (LAT)	10:12.82	Ancuta Bobocel (ROM)	10:14.29	Susi Lutz (GER)	10:14.96
4 × 100 metres relay	Poland (POL); Agnieszka Ceglarek; Marika Popowicz; Marta Jeschke; Iwona Brzezińska	44.65	Russia (RUS); Yuna Mekhti-Zade; Natalya Dashina; Yuliya Kashina; Yuliya Chermoshanskaya	44.70	France (FRA); Christelle Monne; Nelly Banco; Symphora Behi; Céline Distel	44.79
4 × 400 metres relay	Russia (RUS); Ksenia Kuznetsova; Ksenia Zadorina; Nadezhda Shlyapnikova; Yekaterina Kostetskaya	3:32.63	Germany (GER); Wiebke Ullmann; Désirée Meyer; Julia Müller-Foell; Janin Lindenberg	3:36.63	Ukraine (UKR); Aleksandra Peycheva; Anzhelika Shevchenko; Natalya Lupu; Kseniya Karandyuk	3:36.64
10000 m walk (track)	Vera Sokolova; Russia	43:11.34 WJR CR	Olga Mikhaylova; Russia	45:31.49 PB	Martina Gabrielli; Italy	46:38.53 NJR PB
High jump	Svetlana Shkolina; Russia	1.91 m	Julia Hartmann; Germany	1.87 m	Iryna Kovalenko; Ukraine	1.85 m
Pole vault	Silke Spiegelburg; Germany	4.35 m	Svetlana Makarevich; Belarus	4.20 m NJR	Elena Scarpellini; Italy	4.15 m NJR
Long jump	Denisa Ščerbová; Czech Republic	6.57 m	Amy Harris; Great Britain	6.35 m	Anna Nazarova; Russia	6.31 m
Triple jump	Tetyana Dyachenko; Ukraine	14.04 m NJR	Cristina Bujin; Romania	13.72 m	Liliya Kulyk; Ukraine	13.42 m
Shot put (4 kg)	Denise Hinrichs; Germany	17.55 m	Irina Tarasova; Russia	16.53 m	Magdalena Sobieszek; Poland	16.24 m
Discus throw (1 kg)	Kristina Gehrig; Germany	50.60 m	Liliana Cá; Portugal	49.69 m	Marina Yakimova; Belarus	49.31 m
Hammer throw (4 kg)	Noémi Németh; Hungary	63.70 m	Valentina Srša; Croatia	63.12 m	Laura Gibilisco; Italy	62.58 m
Javelin throw (600 g)	Mariya Abakumova; Russia	57.11 m	Maria Zerva; Greece	56.47 m	Sandra Schaffarzik; Germany	55.49 m
Heptathlon (junior implements)	Jessica Ennis (GBR)	5891 pts	Julia Mächtig (GER)	5830 pts	Ksenija Balta (EST)	5747 pts

== Medal table ==
Rank	Nation	Gold	Silver	Bronze	Total
1	Russia (RUS)	7	12	3	22
2	Great Britain (GBR)	6	5	3	14
3	Germany (DEU)	5	7	4	16
4	Hungary (HUN)	3	3	1	7
5	Poland (POL)	3	2	3	8
6	Croatia (CRO)	3	1	0	4
7	Czech Republic (CZE)	3	0	0	3
8	France (FRA)	2	0	3	5
8	Ukraine (UKR)	2	0	3	5
10	Greece (GRC)	1	3	2	6
11	Belarus (BLR)	1	2	2	5
12	Italy (ITA)	1	1	4	6
13	Ireland (IRL)	1	1	0	2
14	Belgium (BEL)	1	0	1	2
14	Estonia (EST)	1	0	1	2
16	Latvia (LAT)	1	0	0	1
16	Sweden (SWE)	1	0	0	1
16	Turkey (TUR)	1	0	0	1
19	Romania (ROU)	0	2	2	4
20	Serbia and Montenegro (SCG)	0	1	1	2
21	Bulgaria (BUL)	0	1	0	1
21	Lithuania (LTU)	0	1	0	1
21	Norway (NOR)	0	1	0	1
24	Finland (FIN)	0	0	2	2
25	Cyprus (CYP)	0	0	1	1
25	Israel (ISR)	0	0	1	1
25	Moldova (MDA)	0	0	1	1
25	Spain (ESP)	0	0	1	1
Totals (28 entries)		43	43	39	125
