= Mikhail Levin (athlete) =

Russian hammer thrower

Personal information
- Born: 10 April 1986 (age 40)

Sport
- Country: Russia
- Sport: Athletics
- Event: Hammer throw

Achievements and titles
- Personal best: Hammer throw: 71.07 m (2008)

Mikhail Levin (born 10 April 1986) is a Russian male hammer thrower, who won an individual gold medal at the Youth World Championships.
