= Aleksey Sokirskiy =

Russian hammer thrower

Personal information
- Born: March 16, 1985 (age 40) Horlivka, Ukrainian SSR, Soviet Union
- Height: 1.85 m (6 ft 1 in)
- Weight: 108 kg (238 lb)

Sport
- Country: Ukraine (until 2015); Russia (since 2015)
- Sport: Athletics
- Event: Hammer throw
- Updated on 14 August 2012

Aleksey Nikolaevich Sokirskiy (Russian: Алексей Николаевич Сокирский, born March 16, 1985) is a Ukrainian (until 2015) and Russian hammer thrower. His personal best is 76.96, achieved 19 June 2011 in Stockholm. He became a Russian citizen in 2015.

== Competition record ==
Year	Competition	Venue	Position	Notes
Representing Ukraine
2007	European U23 Championships	Debrecen, Hungary	6th	70.63 m
2009	Universiade	Belgrade, Serbia	3rd	73.73 m
2009	World Championships	Berlin, Germany	22nd (q)	72.56 m
2010	European Championships	Barcelona, Spain	6th	76.62 m
2011	World Championships	Daegu, South Korea	17th (q)	73.81 m
Competing as an Authorised Neutral Athlete
2017	World Championships	London, United Kingdom	5th	77.50 m
2018	European Championships	Berlin, Germany	14th (q)	72.97 m
