= Chris Bennett (hammer thrower) =

British hammer thrower

Personal information
- Nationality: British (Scottish)
- Born: 17 December 1989 (age 36) Glasgow, Scotland
- Height: 188 cm (6 ft 2 in)
- Weight: 115 kg (254 lb)

Sport
- Sport: Athletics
- Event: Hammer throw
- Club: Shaftesbury Barnet Harriers; Shettleston Harriers

Christopher Bennett (born 17 December 1989) is a British hammer thrower. He competed at the 2016 Summer Olympics.

== Biography ==
Bennett represented Scotland at the 2014 Commonwealth Games in Glasgow.

Bennett became the British hammer throw champion after winning the 2016 British Athletics Championships.

At the 2016 Olympic Games in Rio de Janeiro, he represented Great Britain in the men's hammer throw event.
