= Mark Dry =

British hammer thrower and Coalville town rugby club bosh master

Personal information
- Nationality: British
- Born: 11 October 1987 (age 38) Milton Keynes, England
- Height: 184 cm (6 ft 0 in)
- Weight: 110.8 kg (244 lb)

Sport
- Sport: Track and field
- Event: Hammer throw
- Club: Woodford Green & Essex Ladies
- Coached by: Tore Gustafsson

Achievements and titles
- Personal best: 76.93 m
Medal record
Men's athletics
Representing Scotland
Commonwealth Games
Bronze medal – third place	2014 Glasgow	Hammer throw
Bronze medal – third place	2018 Gold Coast	Hammer throw

Mark William Dry (born 11 October 1987) is a British former track and field athlete who competed in the hammer throw, who won bronze medals for Scotland at the 2014 and 2018 Commonwealth Games.

== Biography ==
Dry was born in Milton Keynes. In his earlier years he was a member of Elgin Amateur Athletics Club, where he began competing in hammer event in 2005. In his first year, he managed to come tenth in the country as an under-20 athlete. Since 2010, he represents the Woodford Green with Essex Ladies in National Championships, and predominantly competes in England or the United States. Although the top-ranked British athlete, he missed the 2013 World Championships in Athletics due to him having not achieved the B qualifying standard. UK Athletics selected him to receive support from the World Class Performance Programme for 2013-2014 because they judged him to have Olympic potential. In 2013 his seasons' best throw of 74.46m was the best achieved amongst UK men.

Dry podiumed on seven occasions at the British Athletics Championships from 2011 to 2018. In the Scottish Championships he won gold in Kilmarnock in August 2014.

In May 2015, he threw a distance of 76.93m which secured him the fifth spot in the all-time UK rankings.

In a complex anti-doping rule violation case initiated in May 2019 and involved a series of judgements and appeals, Dry ultimately served a 28 month competition ban from February 2020 to January 2022.

== International competitions ==
He competed in the 2010 Commonwealth Games but did not perform well, being placed sixth with 67.41 m, some seven metres short of his best of 74.82 m. He has also competed in the 2009 European Athletics U23 Championships, but failed to live up to expectations and came eighth with a throw almost six metres off his best.

In 2014, competing for Scotland at the XX Commonwealth Games in Glasgow, Dry came third in the Men's Hammer throw finishing behind Jim Steacey (Canada) and Nicholas Miller (England).

Dry represented Great Britain at the 2016 Summer Olympics taking part in the qualification round of the men's hammer throw, but not proceeding to the final.

Dry competed in the 2022 Commonwealth Games placing 10th in the men's hammer throw.
