= 2004 Commonwealth Youth Games =

II Commonwealth Youth Games
- Host city: Bendigo, Australia
- Nations: 22
- Athletes: 980
- Events: 146 in 10 sports
- Opening: 29 November 2004
- Closing: 4 December 2004
- Opened by: Governor John Landy
- Main venue: Tom Flood Sports Centre

The 2004 Commonwealth Youth Games, officially known as the II Commonwealth Youth Games and commonly known as Bendigo 2004, was an international sporting event that was held from 29 November to 4 December 2004 in the small city of Bendigo, Australia. They were the second Commonwealth Youth Games, which are held every four years.

The opening ceremony took place at the Tom Flood Sports Centre. John Landy, a Victorian athlete and state governor, opened the games with Jana Pittman as a special guest. There were 980 athletes representing 22 countries. The mascot of the Games was a sugar glider character named Ausca.

== Sports ==
- Athletics ()
- Badminton ()
- Bowls ()
- Boxing ()
- Cycling ()
- Gymnastics ()
- Rugby sevens ()
- Swimming ()
- Ten-pin bowling ()
- Weightlifting ()

== Medal count ==
* Host nation (Australia)

Rank	Nation	Gold	Silver	Bronze	Total
1	Australia (AUS)*	58	41	30	129
2	England (ENG)	31	29	26	86
3	South Africa (SAF)	20	18	18	56
4	Scotland (SCO)	12	17	23	52
5	New Zealand (NZL)	10	18	19	47
6	Malaysia (MAS)	6	9	3	18
7	Singapore (SIN)	3	2	5	10
8	India (IND)	2	4	4	10
9	Nauru (NRU)	2	1	0	3
10	Jersey (JEY)	1	1	2	4
11	Sri Lanka (SRI)	1	1	0	2
12	Wales (WAL)	0	2	1	3
13	Northern Ireland (NIR)	0	1	3	4
14	Samoa (SAM)	0	1	2	3
15	Solomon Islands (SOL)	0	1	1	2
16	Cook Islands (COK)	0	0	2	2
16	Fiji (FIJ)	0	0	2	2
18	Ghana (GHA)	0	0	1	1
Totals (18 entries)		146	146	142	434
