= Alex Smith (hammer thrower) =

British hammer thrower

Personal information
- Born: 6 March 1988 (age 38) Hull, England
- Height: 1.83 m (6 ft 0 in)
- Weight: 115 kg (254 lb)

Sport
- Sport: Athletics
- Event: Hammer throw
- Club: Sale Harriers
Medal record
Representing Great Britain
World Youth Championships in Athletics
Bronze medal – third place	2005 Marrakesh	Hammer 5kg
Representing England
Commonwealth Games
Silver medal – second place	2010 Delhi	Hammer throw

Alexander David Smith (born 6 March 1988) is an English track and field athlete competing in the hammer throw. He competed at the 2012 Summer Olympics.

== Life and career ==
Born in Hull, he is the son of Dave Smith, a former Commonwealth Games champion in the hammer. His first international medal came at the 2005 World Youth Championships in Athletics, where he was the bronze medallist.

In 2010 he finished second at the 2010 Commonwealth Games in Delhi with a personal best of 72.95 metres. He improved his personal best to 75.63 m in 2012 and was selected to represent Great Britain at the London 2012 Olympic Games, where he reached the final and finished 12th. At the 2014 Commonwealth Games, he finished 4th with a throw of 70.99m.
