= Yury Shayunou =

Belarusian hammer thrower

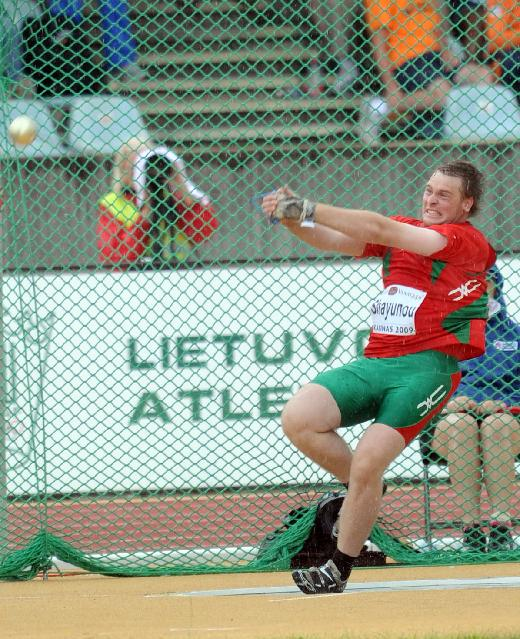
- Yury Shayunou

Medal record

Representing Belarus

Men's athletics

European Athletics U23 Championships
Gold medal – first place	2009 Kaunas	Hammer throw
Gold medal – first place	2007 Debrecen	Hammer throw

Universiade
Gold medal – first place	2009 Belgrad	Hammer throw

Yury Shayunou (Belarusian: Юры Шаюноў; born October 10, 1987) is a Belarusian hammer thrower, coached by his father Victor Shayunou. Yury Shayunou has a personal best of 80.72 meters with the 7.26 kg (or 16 lbs) implement, achieved on July 6, 2009 in Minsk at the Romuald Klim Trophy. He has an orthodox countering technique and relies on his controlled throwing, instead of overpowering the hammer with pure strength. He is therefore an efficient and reliable type of thrower, with a high lowest level in comparison to other hammer throwers of the same calibre.

== Career ==
Yury Shayunou held a relatively low profile in his younger years, considering that the leader of the youth world rankings in 2004 threw almost 9½ meters farther. With a personal best of 73,86 meters with the 5 kg implement, Yury Shayunou was 8th in the IAAF world rankings in 2004. At the age of 18, being a junior, Yury Shayunou threw the 6 kg implement 74,78 meters claiming the bronze medal at the 2005 European Athletics Junior Championships. Yury Shayunou had his breakthrough on July 15, 2007, when he won the 2007 European Athletics U23 Championships. After a fourth place at the 2006 World Junior Championships in Athletics, he had now surpassed every opponent under 23 years of age in the world. His result was 74,92 meters with the 7,26 kg implement. In 2009 Yury Shayunou won the Belarusian national championship, in the absence of Ivan Tikhon and Vadim Devyatovskiy, with 78.76 meters. He later won the 2009 world student games with 76,92 meters and the 2009 European Athletics U23 Championships with 78,16 meters. Yury Shayunou also attended the 2009 World Championships in Athletics in which he went in as second in the world rankings after Hungarian Krísztian Párs. Though, he only finished 12th in the qualifications with a performance of 71,37 followed by two fouls which would not be good enough to grab a position among the 12 best in any of the qualifying groups.

== International honours ==
Competition	Rank	Perf.	Year
2009 World Championships in Athletics	12 q	71,37	2009
2009 European Championships U23	1 f	78,16	2009
2009 World Student Games	1 f	76,92	2009
2007 European Championships U23	1 f	74,92	2007
11th IAAF World Junior Championships	4 f	76,95	2006
18th European Junior Championships	3 f	74,78	2005
10th IAAF World Junior Championships	6 q	66,89	2004

== Progression ==
Impl.	Year	Perf.	Date
7,26 kg	2010	78,73	22/05/2010
7,26 kg	2009	80,72	06/06/2009
7,26 kg	2008	77,32	27/07/2008
7,26 kg	2007	74,92	15/07/2007
6 kg	2006	76,95	18/08/2006
6 kg	2005	74,78	24/07/2005
5 kg	2004	73,86	19/06/2004
5 kg	2003	68,32	23/05/2003
