= Pakistan at the 2011 Commonwealth Youth Games =

- CGF code: PAK
- CGA: Pakistan Olympic Association

in Isle of Man
- Competitors: 4 (2 females and 2 males) in 3 sports
- Medals Ranked 23rd: Gold 0 Silver 0 Bronze 0 Total 0

Commonwealth Youth Games appearances
- 2000; 2004; 2008; 2011; 2015; 2017; 2023

Pakistan competed at the 2011 Commonwealth Youth Games (officially known as the IV Commonwealth Youth Games) in Isle of Man from 7 to 13 September 2011.The Pakistan Olympic Association selected 4 competitors. None of them won any medals.
