= 2008 Commonwealth Youth Games medal table =

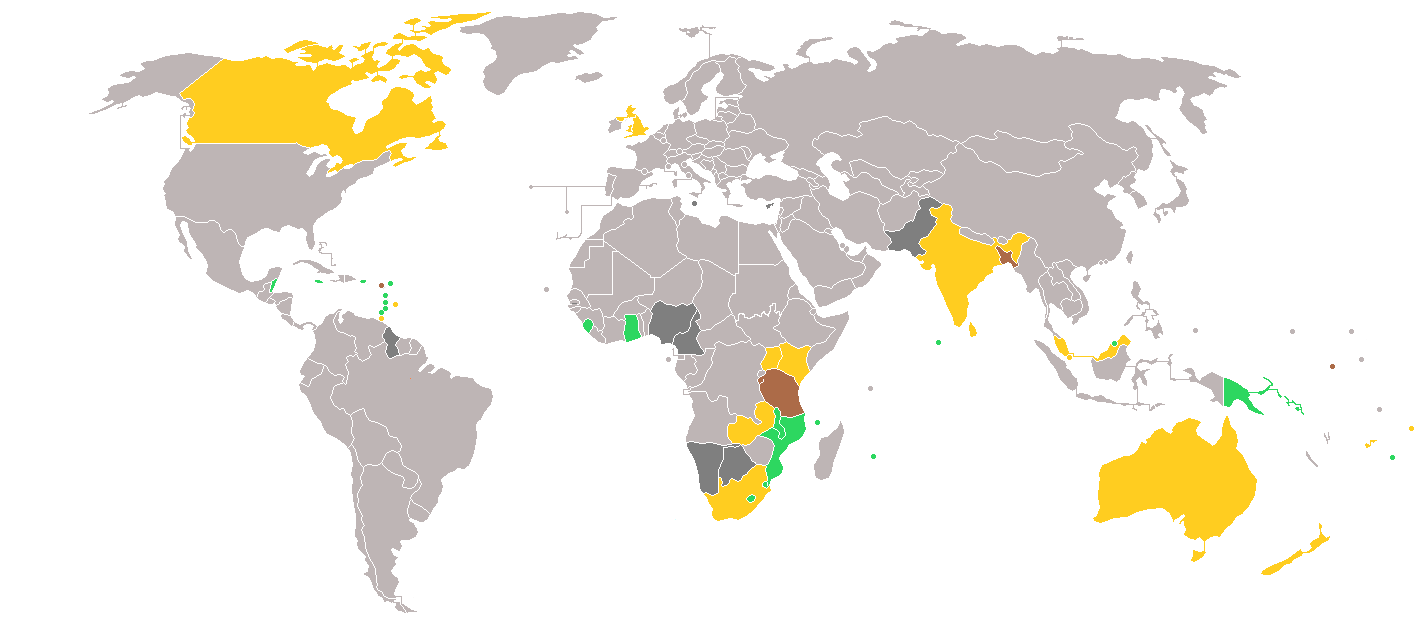
Map of the Commonwealth of Nations showing the achievements of each country during the 2011 Commonwealth Youth Games in Pune.

The 2008 Commonwealth Youth Games, officially known as the III Commonwealth Youth Games, were a multi-sport event held in the Indian city of Pune from 12 to 18 October 2008. This was the first time in the history of the Commonwealth Youth Games that the Games were organised in Asia. At the Games, 1220 athletes between 14 and 18 years of age from 71 Commonwealth of Nations competed in nine sports.

Athletes from 34 nations won at least one medal, and athletes from 19 of these nations secured at least one gold. India lead the medal count for the first time in Commonwealth Youth Games, with 33 gold medals. Athletes from India also led the silver medal count, with 26 medals. Australia claimed 65 medals in total (including 24 gold), earning second spot on the table. Athletes from Australia led the bronze medal count, with 23 medals. Australia was the host nation of the 2004 Commonwealth Youth Games, in which it ranked first in the medal table, with 58 gold and 129 overall medals.

== Medal table ==
The ranking in this table is based on the official medal standings approved by the CYG 2008 Organising Committee. By default, the table is ordered by the number of gold medals the athletes from a nation have won (in this context, a "nation" is an entity represented by a Commonwealth Games Association). The number of silver medals is taken into consideration next and then the number of bronze medals. If nations are still tied, equal ranking is given and they are listed alphabetically by CGF country code.

- To sort this table by nation, total medal count, or any other column, click on the icon next to the column title.

* Host nation (India)

Rank	CGA	Gold	Silver	Bronze	Total
1	India (IND)*	33	26	17	76
2	Australia (AUS)	24	18	23	65
3	England (ENG)	18	9	14	41
4	South Africa (RSA)	7	14	9	30
5	Canada (CAN)	6	11	9	26
6	Wales (WAL)	5	5	6	16
7	Malaysia (MAS)	3	4	6	13
8	Scotland (SCO)	3	3	12	18
9	New Zealand (NZL)	3	1	3	7
10	Kenya (KEN)	3	0	3	6
11	Sri Lanka (SRI)	3	0	0	3
12	Singapore (SIN)	2	5	4	11
13	Northern Ireland (NIR)	1	4	5	10
14	Uganda (UGA)	1	3	1	5
15	Samoa (SAM)	1	1	2	4
16	Zambia (ZAM)	1	1	1	3
17	Fiji (FIJ)	1	1	0	2
18	Barbados (BAR)	1	0	0	1
18	Grenada (GRN)	1	0	0	1
18	Guernsey (GUE)	1	0	0	1
21	Pakistan (PAK)	0	2	1	3
22	Nigeria (NGR)	0	1	2	3
23	Botswana (BOT)	0	1	1	2
23	Cameroon (CMR)	0	1	1	2
25	Cyprus (CYP)	0	1	0	1
25	Gambia (GAM)	0	1	0	1
25	Guyana (GUY)	0	1	0	1
25	Malta (MLT)	0	1	0	1
25	Namibia (NAM)	0	1	0	1
30	Bangladesh (BAN)	0	0	1	1
30	Nauru (NRU)	0	0	1	1
30	Saint Kitts and Nevis (SKN)	0	0	1	1
30	Tanzania (TAN)	0	0	1	1
Totals (33 entries)		118	116	124	358

== See also ==
- 2010 Commonwealth Games medal table
- 2011 Commonwealth Youth Games medal table
