= Dominica at the 2011 Commonwealth Youth Games =

- CGF code: DMA
- CGA: Dominica National Olympic Committee

in Isle of Man
- Competitors: 4 in 2 sports
- Medals Ranked 22nd: Gold 0 Silver 0 Bronze 1 Total 1

Commonwealth Youth Games appearances
- 2000; 2004; 2008; 2011; 2015; 2017; 2023

Dominica competed in the 2011 Commonwealth Youth Games held in the British Crown Dependency of Isle of Man from September 7 to 13, 2011. Their participation marked their second Commonwealth Youth Games appearance. The Dominican delegation consisted of four competitors (two men and two women) who competed in two different sports. This was a decrease in the number of athletes from the nation's last appearance at the Games, when five athletes were sent to Pune. Shanica Yankey won a bronze medal in the javelin throw with a best throw of 38.08 m. Yankey was the only medal winner for Dominica, and the country finished last in the medal table, in 22nd position, sharing the position with nine other Commonwealth Games Associations. Yankey's was the first medal for Dominica in the history of the Games.

== Background ==
Independent Dominica became the member of the Commonwealth of Nations in 1978, but it had already made its debut in the Commonwealth Games in 1958, with further appearances coming in 1962 and 1970, then not appearing for twenty-four years. It has appeared at every Games since 1994. Dominica did not participate in the first two—2000 Edinburgh and 2004 Bendigo—Commonwealth Youth Games. It entered five athletes—all participated in athletic events—in the 2008 Commonwealth Youth Games in Pune, India, but failed to win any medal.

Dominica National Olympic Committee selected a delegation consisted of four contingents for the 2011 Commonwealth Youth Games. In the delegation there were two male pugilists (Megel Drigo and Jamesy Greenaway) and two female athletes (Chelsey Linton and Shanica Yankey), competed in track events.

== Athletics ==
Two women athletes represented Dominica in athletics. None of the athletes participated in any running event; Chelsey Linton competed in long jump and high jump, while Shanica Yankey competed in javelin throw. Linton ranked fifth in the final standings of long jump, with a best jump of 5.72 m, and she failed to start her high jump event. Shanica Yankey's best throw of 38.08 m won her a bronze medal.

Women

Athlete	Events	Final	
Athlete	Events	Result	Rank
Chelsey Linton	Long jump	5.72 m	5
Chelsey Linton	High jump	DNS	
Shanica Yankey	Javelin throw	38.08 m	Bronze medal

== Boxing ==
The boxing squad of the Dominica for the Games included two boxers, Megel Drigo and Jamesy Greenaway, competing in the bantamweight and light welterweight classes, respectively. Drigo received a bye in the first round and lost his quarterfinals match to Cliff Wale of Solomon Islands, after retiring from the match due to injury. An injury also forced Greenaway to retire from his match against Aryk Whalley of New Zealand.

Athlete	Event	Round of 16	Quarterfinals	Semifinals	Final	
Athlete	Event	Opposition Result	Opposition Result	Opposition Result	Opposition Result	Rank
Megel Drigo	Bantamweight	Bye	Cliff Wale (SOL); L Retired injured	Did Not Advance		
Jamesy Greenaway	Light Welterweight	Aryk Whalley (NZL); L Retired injured	Did Not Advance			

- Bye = Athlete received a bye.
