= Saint Kitts and Nevis at the 2011 Commonwealth Youth Games =

- CGF code: SKN
- CGA: Saint Kitts and Nevis Olympic Committee

in Isle of Man
- Competitors: 3 in 1 sport
- Medals Ranked 22nd: Gold 0 Silver 0 Bronze 1 Total 1

Commonwealth Youth Games appearances
- 2000; 2004; 2008; 2011; 2015; 2017; 2023

Saint Kitts and Nevis competed in the 2011 Commonwealth Youth Games held in the British Crown Dependency of Isle of Man from 7 to 13 September 2011. Their participation marked their second Commonwealth Youth Games appearance. Saint Kitts and Nevis sent a delegation consisting of three athletes (two men and one woman) who participated in three athletic events. This was a decrease in the number of participating athletes from the nation's last appearance at the Games when six athletes were sent to Pune. Adrian Williams earned a bronze medal in the javelin throw, with a best throw of 63.02 m. Williams was the only medalist for Saint Kitts and Nevis, and helped his nation to manage a place in the medal table. Saint Kitts and Nevis ranked last (at 22nd spot) with nine other Commonwealth Games Associations. This was also the first medal for Saint Kitts and Nevis in the history of the Games.

== Athletics ==
All the athletes sent by Saint Kitts and Nevis participated in track and field events. Both the male athletes, Adrian Williams and J’Anthon Silliday, competed in the javelin throw; while the sole female athlete, Noah Herbert, represented Saint Kitts and Nevis in the sprint races (100 and 200 m).

Men

Adrian Williams succeeded in winning a bronze medal at the javelin event, with a best throw of 63.02 m. J’Anthon Silliday managed only a best throw of 52.53 m, ranking him eighth in the final standings.

Athlete	Events	Final	
Athlete	Events	Result	Rank
Adrian Williams	Javelin throw	63.02 m	Bronze medal
J’Anthon Silliday	Javelin throw	52.53 m	8

Women

Noah Herbert took a time of 12.84 to complete her preliminary heat in the 100 m sprint; ranking her fourth, and so Herbert did not qualify for the semi-finals. Herbert also participated in the 200 m, and ensured a place in the semi-finals after finishing fourth with a time of 26.02. But an injury forced her out of the competition.

Athlete	Events	Heat		Semi-final		Final	
Athlete	Events	Result	Rank	Result	Rank	Result	Rank
Noah Herbert	100 m	12.84	4	Did Not Advance			
Noah Herbert	200 m	26.02	4	DNS		Did Not Advance	
