= Solomon Islands at the 2011 Commonwealth Youth Games =

- CGF code: SOL

in Isle of Man
- Competitors: 3 in 2 sports
- Medals Ranked 22nd: Gold 0 Silver 0 Bronze 1 Total 1

Commonwealth Youth Games appearances
- 2000; 2004; 2008; 2011; 2015; 2017; 2023

Solomon Islands competed in the 2011 Commonwealth Youth Games held in the British Crown Dependency of Isle of Man from 7 to 13 September 2011. Their participation marked their third Commonwealth Youth Games appearance. The Solomon Islands delegation consisted of three athletes (one woman and two men) who competed in four events in two different sports. This was a decrease in the number of participating athletes from the nation's last appearance at the Games when seven athletes were sent to Pune.

Cliff Wale was the sole medalist from Solomon Islands, winning a bronze medal in the bantamweight category of boxing after reaching the semifinal, which he lost to Qais Ashfaq of England. This was the first medal for Solomon Islands in the history of the Games. Solomon Islands, ranked at 22nd, was last in the medal table, a position shared with nine other Commonwealth Games Associations.

== Athletics ==
Two athletes represented Solomon Islands in athletics. Alwin Muha cleared his heat of 200 m at third spot with a time of 23.19, and qualified for the semifinal, but was eliminated in the semifinal round after finishing sixth. Muha also competed in the 400 m race. He took a time of 53.03 to finish his preliminary heat and ranked fourth, not high enough to ensure a berth in the semifinal.

Freda Mama participated in the middle-distance race of 3000 m. She ranked ninth in the final standings of her event with a time of 12:59.72.

Men

Athlete	Events	Heat		Semifinal		Final	
Athlete	Events	Result	Rank	Result	Rank	Result	Rank
Alwin Muha	200 m	23.19 s	3Q	23.72 s	6	Did Not Advance	
Alwin Muha	400 m	53.03 s	4	Did Not Advance			

Women

Athlete	Events	Heat		Semifinal		Final	
Athlete	Events	Result	Rank	Result	Rank	Result	Rank
Freda Mama	3000 m	N/A				12:59.72	9

== Boxing ==
Cliff Wale competed for Solomon Islands in the bantamweight category of boxing. He received a bye in first round, and his opponent left the quarterfinals match due to injury. In the semifinals he faced Qais Ashfaq of England. The match finished with no points scored by either boxer, but Ashfaq was declared the winner on the judges decision. Wale's appearance in the semifinals ensured him a bronze medal in the event, which he shared with Obedy Mutapa of Zambia—another semifinalist lost to silver medalist of the event, Jessy Brown of Canada.

Athlete	Event	Round of 16	Quarterfinals	Semifinals	Final	
Athlete	Event	Opposition Result	Opposition Result	Opposition Result	Opposition Result	Rank
Cliff Wale	Bantamweight	Bye	Megel Drigo (DMA); W Opponent retired injured	(England) Qais Ashfaq (ENG); L 0–0 Opponent won after judges decision	Did Not Advance	Bronze medal
