= Jersey at the 2011 Commonwealth Youth Games =

- CGF code: JER
- CGA: Commonwealth Games Association of Jersey

in Isle of Man
- Competitors: 7 in 2 sports
- Medals Ranked 18th: Gold 0 Silver 1 Bronze 0 Total 1

Commonwealth Youth Games appearances
- 2000; 2004; 2008; 2011; 2015; 2017; 2023

Jersey competed at the 2011 Commonwealth Youth Games in Isle of Man from 7 to 13 September 2011. The Commonwealth Games Association of Jersey selected 7 competitors. Jersey won a silver medal in . They finished eighteenth in the medal table.
