= Singapore at the 2011 Commonwealth Youth Games =

- CGF code: SIN
- CGA: Singapore National Olympic Council

in Isle of Man
- Competitors: 6 (1 females and 5 males) in 2 sports
- Medals Ranked 25th: Gold 0 Silver 0 Bronze 1 Total 1

Commonwealth Youth Games appearances
- 2000; 2004; 2008; 2011; 2015; 2017; 2023

Singapore competed at the 2011 Commonwealth Youth Games in Isle of Man from 7 to 13 September 2011.The Singapore National Olympic Committee selected 6 competitors. Tan Wei-An Terry won bronze medal in the Men's Vault CIII event of Gymnastics
