= Sri Lanka at the 2011 Commonwealth Youth Games =

- CGF code: SRI
- CGA: Sri Lanka National Olympic Committee

in Isle of Man
- Competitors: 25 in 5 sports
- Medals Ranked 17th: Gold 0 Silver 1 Bronze 1 Total 2

Commonwealth Youth Games appearances
- 2000; 2004; 2008; 2011; 2015; 2017; 2023

Sri Lanka competed at the 2011 Commonwealth Youth Games in Isle of Man from 7 to 13 September 2011. The Sri Lankan National Olympic Committee selected 25 competitors to participate in 5 different sports. Sri Lanka finished in the 17th place with a silver medal and one bronze medal.
