= Turks and Caicos Islands at the 2011 Commonwealth Youth Games =

- CGF code: TCI
- CGA: Turks and Caicos Islands Commonwealth Games Association

in Isle of Man
- Competitors: 3 in 1 sport
- Medals Ranked 22nd: Gold 0 Silver 0 Bronze 1 Total 1

Commonwealth Youth Games appearances
- 2000; 2004; 2008; 2011; 2015; 2017; 2023

The Turks and Caicos Islands competed in the 2011 Commonwealth Youth Games held in the British Crown Dependency of Isle of Man from 7 to 13 September 2011. Their participation marked their second Commonwealth Youth Games appearance. The Caribbean British Overseas Territory sent a delegation that consisted of three competitors (one man and two women) participating in the athletics—one out of seven sports of the Games—events only. This was a decrease in the number of athletes from the nation's last appearance at the Games, when eight athletes were sent to the 2008 Commonwealth Youth Games in Pune. Ifeany Otounye won the sole medal of the Turks and Caicos Islands in the Games, a bronze in long jump with a best jump of 7.15 m, setting a new national record in the event. Otounye improved the national record by 5 centimeters, the previous one was 7.10 m, set by Levard Missick 13 years ago during the 1998 Commonwealth Games in Kuala Lumpur, Malaysia. Turks and Caicos Islands ranked last—at 22nd spot—in the medal table of the Games, the position shared by nine other Commonwealth Games Associations.

== Delegation ==
Turks and Caicos Islands Commonwealth Games Association selected three athletes – one man and two women – to represent the nation in the 2011 Commonwealth Youth Games; all contingents participated in the athletics events only. Ifeany Otounye competed in the 200 m and long jump events. Serena Delancy and Dixie Smith participated in 200 m; Smith also competed in 400 m, while Delancy represented her nation in the long jump.

== Athletics ==
Men

Athlete	Events	Heat		Semifinal		Final	
Athlete	Events	Result	Rank	Result	Rank	Result	Rank
Ifeany Otounye	200 m	22.42Q	2	23.02	5	Did Not Advance	
Ifeany Otounye	Long jump	N/A				7.15	Bronze medal

Women

Athlete	Events	Heat		Semifinal		Final	
Athlete	Events	Result	Rank	Result	Rank	Result	Rank
Serena Delancy	200 m	30.24	4	Did Not Advance			
Serena Delancy	Long jump	N/A				3.98 m	9
Dixie Smith	200 m	29.73	5	Did Not Advance			
Dixie Smith	400 m	72.96	72.96	4	Did Not Advance		
