= Cyprus at the 2011 Commonwealth Youth Games =

- CGF code: CYP
- CGA: Cyprus National Olympic Committee

in Isle of Man
- Competitors: 11 in 5 sports
- Medals Ranked 11th: Gold 3 Silver 0 Bronze 3 Total 6

Commonwealth Youth Games appearances
- 2000; 2004; 2008; 2011; 2015; 2017; 2023

Cyprus competed at the 2011 Commonwealth Youth Games in Isle of Man from 7 to 13 September 2011.The Cyprus National Olympic Committee selected 11 competitors. Cyprus won three gold medals and three bronze medals. They finished eleventh in the medal table.
