= Antigua and Barbuda at the 2011 Commonwealth Youth Games =

- CGF code: ANT
- CGA: The Antigua and Barbuda Olympic and Commonwealth Games Association

in Isle of Man
- Competitors: six (five men and one woman) in two sports
- Officials: 3
- Medals Ranked 13th: Gold 1 Silver 1 Bronze 0 Total 2

Commonwealth Youth Games appearances
- 2000; 2004; 2008; 2011; 2015; 2017; 2023

Antigua and Barbuda participated in the 2011 Commonwealth Youth Games in Isle of Man from 7 to 13 September 2011. The Caribbean nation sent a six-member group to compete in only two sports, athletics and swimming, of the seven sport event.

== Delegation ==
The delegation of Antigua and Barbuda for the 2011 Commonwealth Youth Games consisted of nine people including six competitors – five men, one woman – and three officials. Five athletes — Tahir Walsh, Jared Jarvis, Cejaeh Greene, Mark Phillips and Viani Joseph — were selected for athletics events, and one, William "Trey" Smith, represented the nation in swimming. The supporting staff included Ted Daley as coach of the track and field contingent, Mark Mitchell as a swimming coach, and Yvette Francis as chef de mission.

Tahir Walsh, Jared Jarvis, Cejaeh Greene and Mark Phillips constituted the 4×100 meters relay team. Walsh and Jarvis also competed in the 100 meters sprint; Walsh also contested in the 200 meters sprint along with Greene. The sole female athlete to represent the nation, Viani Joseph, competed in the 200 and 400 meters sprints. The only participant in swimming, Smith, took part in the 100 meter freestyle event.
