= New Zealand at the 2011 Commonwealth Youth Games =

- CGF code: NZL
- CGA: New Zealand Olympic Committee Inc.

in Isle of Man
- Competitors: 29 in 5 sports
- Medals Ranked 4th: Gold 6 Silver 6 Bronze 8 Total 20

Commonwealth Youth Games appearances
- 2000; 2004; 2008; 2011; 2015; 2017; 2023

New Zealand competed at the 2011 Commonwealth Youth Games in Isle of Man from 7 to 13 September 2011. The New Zealand Olympic Committee selected 29 competitors. New Zealand won six gold medals, six silver medals and eight bronze medals. They finished fourth overall.
