= 2011 Commonwealth Youth Games medal table =

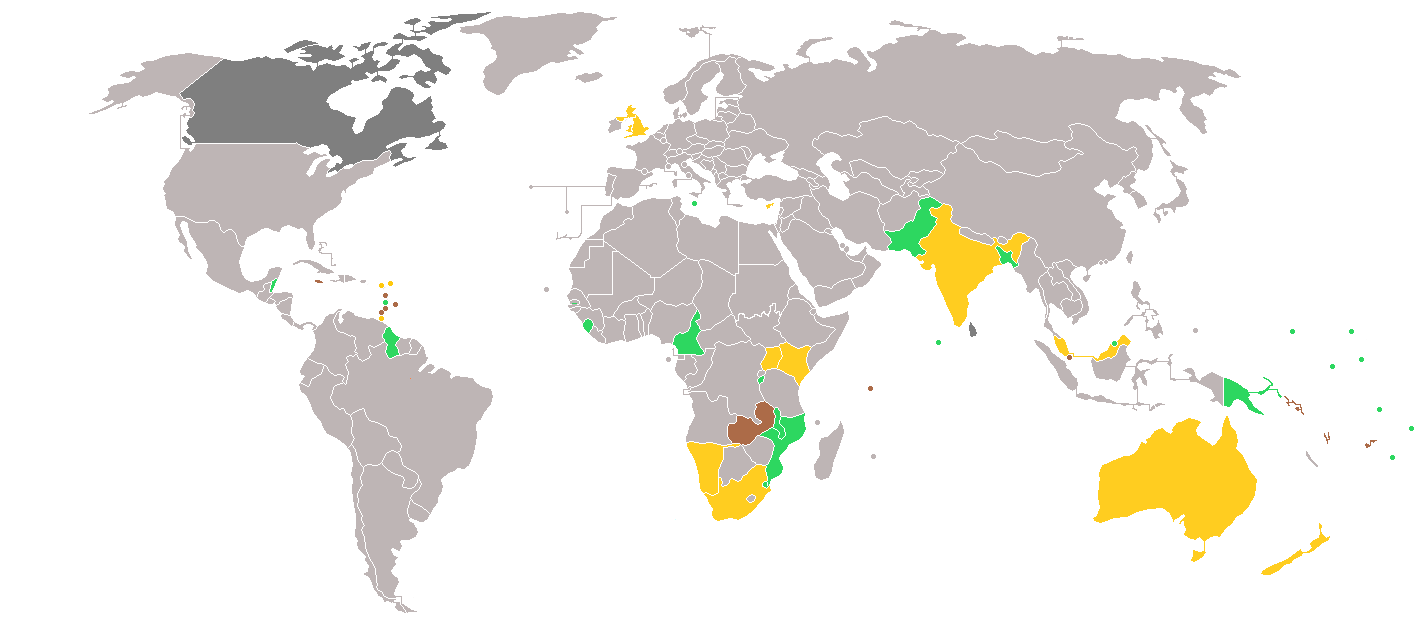
Map of the Commonwealth of Nations showing the achievements of each country during the 2011 Commonwealth Youth Games in Isle of Man.

The 2011 Commonwealth Youth Games, officially known as the IV Commonwealth Youth Games, were a multi-sport event held in the British Crown Dependency of Isle of Man from 7 to 13 September 2011. This was the first time in the history of the Commonwealth Youth Games that Games were organised in any island nation, and second time in any British Islands venue, after inaugural Games in Edinburgh, Scotland in 2000. At the Games, around 1,000 athletes between 14 and 18 years of age from 66 Commonwealth of Nations competed in seven sports.

Athletes from 31 nations won at least one medal, and athletes from 14 of these nations secured at least one gold. England did lead the medal count for the second time in the Commonwealth Youth Games after 2000, with 37 gold medals. Australia claimed 74 medals in total (including 29 gold), earning second spot on the table. Athletes from Australia led the silver and bronze medal count, with 28 and 17 medals respectively. Isle of Man secured 16th position with two silver and one bronze medals, its best ever performance. Isle of Man didn't win any medal in the previous revisions of the Games. Host nation of the 2008 Commonwealth Youth Games, India, devolved to ninth position with three gold and nine overall medals, India ranking first in the medal table of the previous Games, with 33 gold and 76 overall medals.

In badminton, Malaysia won all but one of the five gold medals on offer, the only other gold was won by P. V. Sindhu of India in women's singles. England and Australia dominated in boxing, winning all eight—England five and Australia three—gold medals at stake. Both the countries also preponderated in cycling, earning all the 10 gold medals.

== Medal table ==
The ranking in this table is based on the official medal standings approved by the CYG 2011 Organising Committee. By default, the table is ordered by the number of gold medals the athletes from a nation have won (in this context, a nation is an entity represented by a Commonwealth Games Association). The number of silver medals is taken into consideration next, followed by the number of bronze medals. If nations are still tied, equal ranking is given; they are listed alphabetically by their country codes (similar to IOC country code).

*	Host nation

- To sort this table by nation, total medal count, or any other column, click on the icon next to the column title.

List of medal-winning nations, showing the number of gold, silver, and bronze medals won
Rank	Nation	Gold	Silver	Bronze	Total
1	England (ENG)	37	24	16	77
2	Australia (AUS)	29	28	17	74
3	South Africa (RSA)	8	7	15	30
4	New Zealand (NZL)	6	6	8	20
5	Wales (WAL)	5	11	10	26
6	Scotland (SCO)	5	6	11	22
7	Kenya (KEN)	4	4	2	10
8	Malaysia (MAS)	4	2	1	7
9	India (IND)	3	3	3	9
10	Northern Ireland (NIR)	3	2	3	8
11	Cyprus (CYP)	3	0	3	6
12	Uganda (UGA)	1	3	1	5
13	Antigua and Barbuda (ATG)	1	1	0	2
14	Namibia (NAM)	1	0	0	1
15	Canada (CAN)	0	6	10	16
16	Isle of Man (IOM)*	0	2	1	3
17	Sri Lanka (SRI)	0	1	1	2
18	Jersey (JEY)	0	1	0	1
18	Saint Lucia (LCA)	0	1	0	1
20	Botswana (BOT)	0	0	2	2
20	Jamaica (JAM)	0	0	2	2
22	Barbados (BAR)	0	0	1	1
22	Dominica (DMA)	0	0	1	1
22	Mauritius (MRI)	0	0	1	1
22	Singapore (SIN)	0	0	1	1
22	Solomon Islands (SOL)	0	0	1	1
22	Saint Kitts and Nevis (SKN)	0	0	1	1
22	Tonga (TGA)	0	0	1	1
22	Trinidad and Tobago (TRI)	0	0	1	1
22	Turks and Caicos Islands (TCA)	0	0	1	1
22	Zambia (ZAM)	0	0	1	1
	Total	110	110	110	330

== See also ==
- 2010 Commonwealth Games medal table
