= 2002 in shot put =

This page lists the World Best Year Performance in the year 2002 in both the men's and the women's shot put. One of the main event during this season were the 2002 European Athletics Championships in Munich, Germany, where the final of the men's competition was held on Tuesday August 6, 2002. The women had their final four days later, on Saturday August 10, 2002.

== Men ==
=== Records ===
Standing records prior to the 2002 season in track and field
World Record	Randy Barnes (USA)	23.12 m	May 20, 1990	Los Angeles, United States

=== 2002 World Year Ranking ===
Rank	Mark	Athlete	Venue	Date	Note
1	22.51 m	Adam Nelson (USA)	Portland, United States	2002-05-18	
2	22.19 m	Kevin Toth (USA)	Eugene, United States	2002-05-26	
3	21.91 m	John Godina (USA)	Eugene, United States	2002-05-26	
4	21.60 m	Janus Robberts (RSA)	Baton Rouge, United States	2002-06-01	
5	21.57 m	Joachim Olsen (DEN)	Baton Rouge, United States	2002-06-01	
6	21.47 m	Manuel Martínez (ESP)	Salamanca, Spain	2002-07-10	
7	21.45 m	Christian Cantwell (USA)	Iowa City, United States	2002-05-04	
8	21.37 m	Yuriy Bilonoh (UKR)	Munich, Germany	2002-08-06	
9	21.11 m	Arsi Harju (FIN)	Lapinlahti, Finland	2002-07-14	
10	21.09 m	Ville Tiisanoja (FIN)	Kuortane, Finland	2002-07-28	
11	21.00 m	Jamie Beyer (USA)	Palo Alto, United States	2002-06-22	
12	20.91 m	Justin Anlezark (AUS)	Manchester, Great Britain	2002-07-31	
13	20.86 m	Paolo Dal Soglio (ITA)	Riese Pio, Italy	2002-09-22	
14	20.85 m	Ralf Bartels (GER)	Gotha, Germany	2002-06-09	
15	20.82 m	Milan Haborák (SVK)	Thum, Germany	2002-05-19	
16	20.80 m	Tepa Reinikainen (FIN)	Kuortane, Finland	2002-07-28	
17	20.73 m	Jimmy Nordin (SWE)	Ludvika, Sweden	2002-06-27	
18	20.72 m	Carl Myerscough (GBR)	Lincoln, United States	2002-05-04	
19	20.56 m	Szilárd Kiss (HUN)	Debrecen, Hungary	2002-07-26	
20	20.51 m	Tonyo Sylvester (USA)	Palo Alto, United States	2002-06-22	
21	20.50 m	Conny Karlsson (FIN)	Espoo, Finland	2002-05-30	
22	20.47 m	Detlef Bock (GER)	Gotha, Germany	2002-06-09	
22	20.47 m	Reese Hoffa (USA)	Palo Alto, United States	2002-06-22	
24	20.39 m	Rutger Smith (NED)	Hengelo, Netherlands	2002-06-02	
25	20.28 m	Petr Stehlík (CZE)	Patras, Greece	2002-07-14	

== Women ==
=== Records ===
Standing records prior to the 2002 season in track and field
World Record	Natalya Lisovskaya (URS)	22.63 m	June 7, 1987	Moscow, Soviet Union

=== 2002 World Year Ranking ===
Rank	Mark	Athlete	Venue	Date	Note
1	20.64 m	Irina Korzhanenko (RUS)	Munich, Germany	10/08/2002	
2	20.53 m	Svetlana Krivelyova (RUS)	Tula, Russia	02/06/2002	
3	20.07 m	Vita Pavlysh (UKR)	Dortmund, Germany	08/06/2002	
4	19.86 m	Astrid Kumbernuss (GER)	Neuwied-Engers, Germany	17/05/2002	
5	19.40 m	Nadzeya Astapchuk (BLR)	Milan, Italy	05/06/2002	
6	19.39 m	Yumileidi Cumbá (CUB)	Salamanca, Spain	10/07/2002	
7	19.24 m	Nadine Kleinert (GER)	Neuwied-Engers, Germany	17/05/2002	
8	19.20 m	Olga Ryabinkina (RUS)	Tula, Russia	09/06/2002	
8	19.20 m	Teri Steer (USA)	Palo Alto, United States	21/06/2002	
10	18.95 m	Li Meiju (CHN)	Benxi, PR China	09/06/2002	
11	18.92 m	Irina Khudoroshkina (RUS)	Moscow, Russia	28/06/2002	
12	18.73 m	Elena Hila (ROM)	Snagov, Romania	18/05/2002	
12	18.73 m	Krystyna Zabawska (POL)	Sopot, Poland	13/07/2002	
14	18.67 m	Du Xianhui (CHN)	Singapore	17/03/2002	
15	18.62 m	Song Feina (CHN)	Benxi, PR China	09/06/2002	
16	18.51 m	Seilala Sua (USA)	Palo Alto, United States	21/06/2002	
17	18.50 m	Lee Myung-Sun (KOR)	Busan, South Korea	09/10/2002	
18	18.47 m	Lieja Tunks (NED)	Rome, Italy	12/07/2002	
19	18.46 m	Elisângela Adriano (BRA)	São Caetano do Sul, Brazil	24/08/2002	
20	18.40 m	Valerie Vili (NZL)	Madrid, Spain	21/09/2002	
21	18.39 m	Li Fengfeng (CHN)	Tiantai, PR China	27/10/2002	
22	18.38 m	Zhang Xiaoyu (CHN)	Baoding, PR China	09/09/2002	
23	18.37 m	Cheng Xiaoyan (CHN)	Shanghai, PR China	18/05/2002	
24	18.34 m	Valentina Fedyushina (AUT)	Lisboa, Portugal	03/07/2002	
25	18.31 m	Katarzyna Zakowicz (POL)	Dortmund, Germany	08/06/2002	
