= 2002 European Athletics Championships – Men's shot put =

Akcent Sbi Copyright

Men's shot put at the European Athletics Championships

These are the official results of the Men's shot put event at the 2002 European Championships in Munich, Germany. There were a total number of 27 participating athletes. The final and the qualification round were both held on Tuesday August 6, 2002, with the qualifying mark set at 20.20 metres.

== Medalists ==
Gold	Yuriy Bilonoh; Ukraine (UKR)
Silver	Joachim Olsen; Denmark (DEN)
Bronze	Ralf Bartels; Germany (GER)

== Schedule ==
- All times are Central European Time (UTC+1)

Qualification Round
Group A	Group B
06.08.2002 – ??:??	06.08.2002 – ??:??
Final Round
06.08.2002 – ??:??

== Abbreviations ==
- All results shown are in metres

Q	automatic qualification
q	qualification by rank
DNS	did not start
NM	no mark
WR	world record
AR	area record
NR	national record
PB	personal best
SB	season best

== Records ==
Standing records prior to the 2002 European Athletics Championships
World Record	Randy Barnes (USA)	23.12 m	May 20, 1990	Los Angeles, United States
Event Record	Werner Günthör (SUI)	22.22 m	August 28, 1986	Stuttgart, West Germany

== Qualification ==
=== Group A ===
Rank	Overall	Athlete	Attempts			Distance	Note
Rank	Overall	Athlete	1	2	3	Distance	Note
1	1	Joachim Olsen (DEN)	20.45	—	—	20.45 m	
2	4	Yuriy Bilonoh (UKR)	19.85	20.22	—	20.22 m	
3	5	Ralf Bartels (GER)	20.22	—	—	20.22 m	
4	7	Ville Tiisanoja (FIN)	19.43	20.16	—	20.16 m	
5	9	Gheorghe Guşet (ROM)	19.45	19.33	19.98	19.98 m	
6	13	Szilárd Kiss (HUN)	19.66	19.55	—	19.66 m	
7	14	Conny Karlsson (FIN)	X	19.66	19.43	19.66 m	
8	15	Yury Bialou (BLR)	19.43	X	19.30	19.43 m	
9	16	Zlatan Zmirak (CRO)	18.87	X	X	18.87 m	
10	19	Ivan Emilianov (MDA)	X	18.06	18.08	18.08 m	
11	21	Giovanni Tubini (ITA)	18.05	X	X	18.05 m	
12	22	Pavel Pankuch (SVK)	17.93	17.8	X	17.93 m	
13	26	Michal Oertelt (CZE)	X	16.66	X	16.66 m	

=== Group B ===
Rank	Overall	Athlete	Attempts			Distance	Note
Rank	Overall	Athlete	1	2	3	Distance	Note
1	2	Arsi Harju (FIN)	20.40	—	—	20.40 m	
2	3	Manuel Martínez (ESP)	20.38	—	—	20.38 m	
3	6	Rutger Smith (NED)	19.17	20.17	—	20.17 m	
4	8	Milan Haborak (SVK)	19.83	20.15	—	20.15 m	
5	10	Roman Virastyuk (UKR)	19.83	19.90	X	19.90 m	
6	11	Petr Stehlík (CZE)	19.17	19.41	19.76	19.76 m	
7	12	Jimmy Nordin (SWE)	19.31	19.76	X	19.76 m	
8	17	Zsolt Biber (HUN)	18.83	X	X	18.83 m	
9	18	Andy Dittmar (GER)	18.77	18.52	18.77	18.77 m	
10	19	Detlef Bock (GER)	17.77	18.08	18.04	18.08 m	
11	23	Marco Dodoni (ITA)	17.82	17.57	17.68	17.82 m	
12	24	Hamza Alić (BIH)	17.29	X	X	17.29 m	
13	25	Antonín Zalsky (CZE)	17.17	X	X	17.17 m	
—	—	Pavel Lyzhin (BLR)	X	X	X	NM	

== Final ==
Rank	Athlete	Attempts						Distance	Note
Rank	Athlete	1	2	3	4	5	6	Distance	Note
1st place, gold medalist(s)	Yuriy Bilonoh (UKR)	20.98	21.37	20.97	20.82	21.04	—	21.37 m	
2nd place, silver medalist(s)	Joachim Olsen (DEN)	20.15	20.71	21.16	21.00	20.53	20.56	21.16 m	
3rd place, bronze medalist(s)	Ralf Bartels (GER)	20.10	19.95	19.48	19.19	20.58	20.42	20.58 m	
4	Arsi Harju (FIN)	19.66	X	X	20.08	19.74	20.47	20.47 m	
5	Manuel Martínez (ESP)	20.45	19.88	X	X	19.90	20.16	20.45 m	
6	Ville Tiisanoja (FIN)	19.73	19.96	20.17	20.09	19.98	20.20	20.20 m	
7	Gheorghe Guşet (ROM)	19.12	19.46	20.05	X	19.47	X	20.05 m	
8	Rutger Smith (NED)	19.37	19.60	19.73	X	—	—	19.73 m	
9	Roman Virastyuk (UKR)	19.52	X	X				19.52 m	
10	Milan Haborák (SVK)	X	19.40	19.20				19.40 m	
11	Jimmy Nordin (SWE)	19.12	X	X				19.12 m	
—	Petr Stehlík (CZE)	X	X	X				NM	

== See also ==
- 1999 Men's World Championships Shot Put (Seville)
- 2000 Men's Olympic Shot Put (Sydney)
- 2001 Men's World Championships Shot Put (Edmonton)
- 2002 Shot Put Year Ranking
- 2003 Men's World Championships Shot Put (Paris)
- 2004 Men's Olympic Shot Put (Athens)
- 2005 Men's World Championships Shot Put (Helsinki)
