= Athletics at the 1999 Summer Universiade – Men's shot put =

The men's shot put event at the 1999 Summer Universiade was held at the Estadio Son Moix in Palma de Mallorca, Spain on 10 July.

== Medalists ==
Gold	Silver	Bronze
Andy Bloom; United States	Adam Nelson; United States	Stevimir Ercegovac; Croatia

== Results ==
=== Qualification ===
Qualification: 18.00 (Q) or at least 12 best performers (q) advance to the final

Rank	Group	Athlete	Nationality	Result	Notes
1	A	Andy Bloom	United States	19.95	Q
2	B	Adam Nelson	United States	19.92	Q
3	B	Mikuláš Konopka	Slovakia	19.01	Q
4	A	Conny Karlsson	Finland	18.72	Q
5	B	Gunnar Pfingsten	Germany	18.65	Q
6	A	Karel Potgieter	South Africa	18.49	Q
7	A	Stevimir Ercegovac	Croatia	18.43	Q
8	A	Brad Snyder	Canada	18.37	Q
9	B	Josef Rosůlek	Czech Republic	18.20	Q
10	A	Szilárd Kiss	Hungary	17.94	q
11	B	Erwin Simpelaar	Netherlands	17.66	q
12	A	Ivan Emilianov	Moldova	17.36	q
13	B	Emeka Udechuku	Great Britain	16.85	
14	A	Mark Edwards	Great Britain	16.64	
15	B	Orlando Ibarra	Colombia	16.43	
16	A	Marco Antonio Verni	Chile	16.23	
17	A	Juan Manuel Tello	Peru	16.23	
18	B	Sukraj Singh	Indonesia	16.04	
19	B	Gerardo Maurer	Chile	14.62	
20	B	Leonardo Ochoa	Peru	14.04	

=== Final ===
Rank	Athlete	Nationality	#1	#2	#3	#4	#5	#6	Result	Notes
1st place, gold medalist(s)	Andy Bloom	United States	20.39	20.93	21.11	x	20.93	19.61	21.11	UR
2nd place, silver medalist(s)	Adam Nelson	United States	x	x	20.64	x	19.60	x	20.64	SB
3rd place, bronze medalist(s)	Stevimir Ercegovac	Croatia							19.94	PB
4	Brad Snyder	Canada							19.80	
5	Conny Karlsson	Finland							19.11	
6	Josef Rosůlek	Czech Republic							18.88	
7	Gunnar Pfingsten	Germany							18.77	
8	Mikuláš Konopka	Slovakia							18.38	
9	Karel Potgieter	South Africa							18.20	
10	Szilárd Kiss	Hungary							18.19	
11	Erwin Simpelaar	Netherlands							17.52	
12	Ivan Emilianov	Moldova							17.43	
