= 2002 European Athletics Indoor Championships – Men's shot put =

The men's shot put event at the 2002 European Athletics Indoor Championships was held on March 1–2.

== Medalists ==
| Gold | Silver | Bronze |
|---|---|---|
| Manuel Martínez; Spain | Joachim Olsen; Denmark | Pavel Chumachenko; Russia |

Note: Mikuláš Konopka of Slovakia had originally won the bronze but was later disqualified for doping.

== Results ==
=== Qualification ===
Qualifying perf. 20.20 (Q) or 8 best performers (q) advanced to the Final.

| Rank | Athlete | Nationality | #1 | #2 | #3 | Result | Note |
|---|---|---|---|---|---|---|---|
| 1 | Joachim Olsen | Denmark | 20.44 | | | 20.44 | Q |
| 2 | Pavel Chumachenko | Russia | 18.54 | 19.55 | 20.35 | 20.35 | Q |
| 3 | Manuel Martínez | Spain | X | 20.19 | – | 20.19 | q |
| 4 | Petr Stehlik | Czech Republic | X | 19.60 | 19.98 | 19.98 | q |
| 5 | Ville Tiisanoja | Finland | 19.92 | 18.82 | 19.24 | 19.92 | q |
| 6 | Pavel Lyzhin | Belarus | X | 19.84 | X | 19.84 | q |
| 7 | Jimmy Nordin | Sweden | 19.67 | X | 19.21 | 19.67 | q |
| 8 | Ralf Bartels | Germany | 19.31 | 18.78 | 19.60 | 19.60 | |
| 9 | Rutger Smith | Netherlands | 18.77 | 18.61 | 19.60 | 19.60 | |
| 10 | Tepa Reinikainen | Finland | 19.27 | 19.55 | 19.24 | 19.55 | |
| 11 | Gheorghe Guşet | Romania | 19.49 | 19.47 | X | 19.49 | |
| 12 | Conny Karlsson | Finland | 19.49 | 19.46 | X | 19.49 | |
| 13 | Paolo Dal Soglio | Italy | 19.44 | X | X | 19.44 | |
| 14 | Zsolt Bíber | Hungary | X | 19.30 | 19.17 | 19.30 | |
| 15 | Detlef Bock | Germany | 18.39 | 18.75 | 19.21 | 19.21 | |
| 16 | Leszek Śliwa | Poland | 17.69 | 19.18 | 19.20 | 19.20 | |
| 17 | Milan Haborák | Slovakia | 18.75 | 19.19 | X | 19.19 | |
| 18 | Andy Dittmar | Germany | 19.05 | X | X | 19.05 | |
| 19 | Ivan Yushkov | Russia | 18.73 | 18.74 | 18.83 | 18.83 | SB |
| 20 | Marco Dodoni | Italy | 18.65 | 18.64 | X | 18.65 | |
| 21 | Ivan Emilianov | Moldova | 18.54 | 18.62 | X | 18.62 | PB |
| 22 | Sergio Mottin | Italy | 18.21 | X | 18.00 | 18.21 | |
| 23 | Marco Fortes | Portugal | X | 16.91 | 16.97 | 16.97 | |
| 24 | Andreas Vlasny | Austria | X | 16.11 | 16.03 | 16.11 | |
| | Tigran Rostomyan | Armenia | – | – | – | DNF | |
| | Mikuláš Konopka | Slovakia | | | | DQ | |

=== Final ===
| Rank | Athlete | Nationality | #1 | #2 | #3 | #4 | #5 | #6 | Result | Note |
|---|---|---|---|---|---|---|---|---|---|---|
| 1st place, gold medalist(s) | Manuel Martínez | Spain | 20.68 | 19.50 | 20.63 | 20.95 | 21.26 | X | 21.26 | NR |
| 2nd place, silver medalist(s) | Joachim Olsen | Denmark | 20.55 | 20.65 | 20.55 | 20.31 | 21.13 | 21.23 | 21.23 | |
| 3rd place, bronze medalist(s) | Pavel Chumachenko | Russia | 19.76 | X | 19.92 | X | 19.77 | 20.30 | 20.30 | |
| 4 | Ville Tiisanoja | Finland | 20.19 | 19.85 | 19.53 | 19.86 | X | 19.55 | 20.19 | |
| 5 | Petr Stehlik | Czech Republic | 19.37 | 19.26 | 19.86 | 19.62 | 19.54 | X | 19.86 | |
| 6 | Pavel Lyzhin | Belarus | 18.86 | 19.79 | X | X | X | X | 19.79 | |
| 7 | Jimmy Nordin | Sweden | X | X | X | X | 19.69 | X | 19.69 | |
| | Mikuláš Konopka | Slovakia | | | | | | | DQ | |
