= 2005 World Championships in Athletics – Men's shot put =

Shot Put event held in Helsinki, Finland

The Men's Shot Put event at the 2005 World Championships in Athletics was held at the Helsinki Olympic Stadium on August 6.

== Medalists ==
Gold	Adam Nelson; United States (USA)
Silver	Rutger Smith; Netherlands (NED)
Bronze	Ralf Bartels; Germany (GER)

== Schedule ==
- All times are Eastern European Time (UTC+2)

Qualification Round
Group A	Group B
06.08.2005 – 10:00h	06.08.2005 – 11:30h
Final Round
06.08.2005 – 21:00h

== Abbreviations ==
- All results shown are in metres

Q	automatic qualification
q	qualification by rank
DNS	did not start
NM	no mark
WR	world record
AR	area record
NR	national record
PB	personal best
SB	season best

== Records ==
Standing records prior to the 2005 World Athletics Championships
World Record	Randy Barnes (USA)	23.12 m	May 20, 1990	Westwood, United States
Event Record	Werner Günthör (SUI)	22.23 m	August 29, 1987	Rome, Italy

== Results ==
=== Qualifying ===
==== Group A ====
1. Christian Cantwell, United States 21.11 Q
2. Joachim Olsen, Denmark 20.85 Q
3. Adam Nelson, United States 20.35 Q
4. Tepa Reinikainen, Finland 20.19 q
5. Tomasz Majewski, Poland 20.19 q
6. Carl Myerscough, Great Britain 20.07 q
7. Gheorghe Guset, Romania 19.83
8. Manuel Martínez, Spain 19.55
9. Petr Stehlik, Czech Republic 19.48
10. Miran Vodovnik, Slovenia 19.28
11. Ivan Yushkov, Russia 18.98
12. Marco Antonio Verni, Chile 18.60
13. Dorian Scott, Jamaica 18.33
- Andrey Mikhnevich, Belarus ~~20.54~~ Q, DQ
- Shaka Sola, Samoa DNS

==== Group B ====
1. Ralf Bartels, Germany 20.56 Q
2. Mikulas Konopka, Slovakia 20.39 Q
3. Rutger Smith, Netherlands 20.26 Q
4. Ville Tiisanoja, Finland 20.18 q
5. Khaled Habash Al-Suwaidi, Qatar 19.72
6. Anton Lyuboslavskiy, Russia 19.56
7. John Godina, United States 19.54
8. Dragan Peric, Serbia and Montenegro 19.46
9. Taavi Peetre, Estonia 19.20
10. Yuriy Belov, Belarus 19.16
11. Hamza Alic, Bosnia and Herzegovina 18.77
12. Edis Elkasevic, Croatia 18.59
- Janus Robberts, South Africa NM
- Pavel Lyzhyn, Belarus NM
- Yuriy Bilonoh, Ukraine ~~20.21~~ q, DQ

==== Final ====
1. Adam Nelson, United States 21.73 (SB)
2. Rutger Smith, Netherlands 21.29
3. Ralf Bartels, Germany 20.99
4. Christian Cantwell, United States 20.87
5. Joachim Olsen, Denmark 20.73
6. Ville Tiisanoja, Finland 20.57
7. Tomasz Majewski, Poland 20.23
8. Tepa Reinikainen, Finland 20.09
9. Mikuláš Konopka, Slovakia 19.72
10. Carl Myerscough, Great Britain 19.67
- Yuriy Bilonoh, Ukraine ~~20.89~~ DQ
- Andrey Mikhnevich, Belarus ~~20.74~~ DQ

== See also ==
- 2005 Shot Put Year Ranking
