= Athletics at the 2001 Summer Universiade – Men's shot put =

The men's shot put event at the 2001 Summer Universiade was held at the Workers Stadium in Beijing, China. The final took place on 29–30 August.

== Medalists ==
| Gold | Silver | Bronze |
|---|---|---|
| Manuel Martínez; Spain | Yuriy Bilonoh; Ukraine | Milan Haborák; Slovakia |

== Results ==
=== Qualification ===
| Rank | Group | Athlete | Nationality | Result | Notes |
|---|---|---|---|---|---|
| 1 | A | Stevimir Ercegovac | Croatia | 19.84 | |
| 2 | B | Manuel Martínez | Spain | 19.22 | |
| 3 | A | Yuriy Bilonoh | Ukraine | 19.16 | |
| 4 | B | Milan Haborák | Slovakia | 19.06 | |
| 5 | A | Jamie Beyer | United States | 19.00 | |
| 6 | A | Reese Hoffa | United States | 18.87 | |
| 7 | B | René Sack | Germany | 18.84 | |
| 8 | A | Karel Potgieter | South Africa | 18.72 | |
| 9 | B | Marco Antonio Verni | Chile | 18.72 | |
| 10 | B | Mikuláš Konopka | Slovakia | 18.58 | |
| 11 | A | Rutger Smith | Netherlands | 18.21 | |
| 12 | B | Paolo Capponi | Italy | 18.15 | |
| 13 | A | Szilárd Kiss | Hungary | 17.95 | |
| 14 | B | Wang Zhiyong | China | 17.85 | |
| 15 | A | Erik van Vreumingen | Netherlands | 17.63 | |
| 16 | A | Ivan Yushkov | Russia | 17.60 | |
| 17 | B | Marc Sandmeier | Switzerland | 17.18 | |
| 18 | A | Fatih Yazıcı | Turkey | 17.01 | |
| 19 | B | Mohamed Abou Nasr | Egypt | 16.88 | |
| 20 | A | Emeka Udechuku | Nigeria | 16.77 | |
| 21 | ? | Dumisani Fakudze | Swaziland | 13.56 | |
| 22 | ? | Erick Melendez | Peru | 11.89 | |
| | B | Mark Edwards | Great Britain | NM | |
| | B | Chang Ming-huang | Chinese Taipei | NM | |

=== Final ===
| Rank | Athlete | Nationality | Result | Notes |
|---|---|---|---|---|
| 1st place, gold medalist(s) | Manuel Martínez | Spain | 20.97 | |
| 2nd place, silver medalist(s) | Yuriy Bilonoh | Ukraine | 20.16 | |
| 3rd place, bronze medalist(s) | Milan Haborák | Slovakia | 19.90 | |
| 4 | Karel Potgieter | South Africa | 19.51 | |
| 5 | Mikuláš Konopka | Slovakia | 19.51 | |
| 6 | Stevimir Ercegovac | Croatia | 19.29 | |
| 7 | René Sack | Germany | 18.85 | |
| 8 | Paolo Capponi | Italy | 18.75 | |
| 9 | Reese Hoffa | United States | 18.67 | |
| 10 | Jamie Beyer | United States | 18.48 | |
| 11 | Marco Antonio Verni | Chile | 18.31 | |
| 12 | Rutger Smith | Netherlands | 18.17 | |
