= 2001 World Championships in Athletics – Men's shot put =

The Men's Shot Put event at the 2001 World Championships in Edmonton, Alberta, Canada was held on Saturday August 4, 2001. There were a total number of 30 participating athletes, with the qualification mark set at 20.45 metres.

== Doping ==
Andrey Mikhnevich of Belarus tested positive for Human chorionic gonadotropin during the championships and his results were subsequently disqualified.

== Medalists ==
Gold	John Godina; United States (USA)
Silver	Adam Nelson; United States (USA)
Bronze	Arsi Harju; Finland (FIN)

== Schedule ==
- All times are Mountain Standard Time (UTC-7)

Qualification Round
Group A	Group B
04.08.2001 – 08:30h	04.08.2001 – 08:30h
Final Round
04.08.2001 – 16:00h

== Abbreviations ==
- All results shown are in metres

Q	automatic qualification
q	qualification by rank
DNS	did not start
NM	no mark
WR	world record
AR	area record
NR	national record
PB	personal best
SB	season best
DQ	disqualified

== Records ==
Standing records prior to the 2001 World Athletics Championships
World Record	Randy Barnes (USA)	23.12 m	May 20, 1990	Westwood, United States
Event Record	Werner Günthör (SUI)	22.23 m	August 29, 1987	Rome, Italy
Season Best	Janus Robberts (RSA)	21.97 m	June 2, 2001	Eugene, United States

== Qualification ==
=== Group A ===
Rank	Overall	Athlete	Attempts			Distance	Note
Rank	Overall	Athlete	1	2	3	Distance	Note
1	3	John Godina (USA)	18.28	20.06	20.52	20.52 m	
2	4	Manuel Martínez (ESP)	20.08	20.44	20.50	20.50 m	
3	5	Bradley Snyder (CAN)	20.47	—	—	20.47 m	
4	11	Ville Tiisanoja (FIN)	20.07	20.14	—	20.14 m	
5	15	Petr Stehlík (CZE)	19.68	X	X	19.68 m	
6	18	Pavel Chumachenko (RUS)	X	19.35	19.27	19.35 m	
7	19	Dzimitry Hancharuk (BLR)	19.27	X	X	19.27 m	
8	20	John Davis (USA)	X	19.11	X	19.11 m	
9	21	Oliver-Sven Buder (GER)	18.62	18.89	—	18.89 m	
10	21	Mikuláš Konopka (SVK)	18.60	X	18.89	18.89 m	
11	24	Jimmy Nordin (SWE)	18.85	18.65	X	18.85 m	
12	24	Marco Antonio Verni (CHI)	18.85	X	18.03	18.85 m	
13	26	Yves Niaré (FRA)	X	X	18.71	18.71 m	
14	28	Ivan Emelianov (MDA)	X	17.87	18.06	18.06 m	
15	30	Mark Proctor (GBR)	16.98	X	17.75	17.75 m	

=== Group B ===
Rank	Overall	Athlete	Attempts			Distance	Note
Rank	Overall	Athlete	1	2	3	Distance	Note
1	1	Janus Robberts (RSA)	21.26	—	—	21.26 m	
2	2	Conny Karlsson (FIN)	20.72	—	—	20.72 m	PB
3	6	Yuriy Bilonoh (UKR)	20.46	—	—	20.46 m	
4	7	Dragan Perić (YUG)	20.43	—	—	20.43 m	SB
5	8	Arsi Harju (FIN)	19.70	X	20.39	20.39 m	
6	9	Joachim Olsen (DEN)	20.32	20.26	—	20.32 m	
7	10	Andrey Mikhnevich (BLR)	20.11	20.05	20.31	20.31 m	SB
8	12	Adam Nelson (USA)	20.13	X	X	20.13 m	
9	13	Paolo Dal Soglio (ITA)	19.71	19.80	19.72	19.80 m	
10	14	Gheorghe Guşet (ROM)	X	19.74	X	19.74 m	
11	16	Milan Haborák (SVK)	19.35	19.52	19.46	19.52 m	
12	17	Ralf Bartels (GER)	19.41	19.24	X	19.41 m	
13	21	Gjøran Sørli (NOR)	18.89	X	X	18.89 m	
14	27	Justin Anlezark (AUS)	18.70	18.33	18.14	18.70 m	SB
15	29	Yojer Medina (VEN)	X	17.75	17.76	17.76 m	

== Final ==
Rank	Athlete	Attempts						Distance	Note
Rank	Athlete	1	2	3	4	5	6	Distance	Note
1st place, gold medalist(s)	John Godina (USA)	21.87	21.80	X	X	X	X	21.87 m	
2nd place, silver medalist(s)	Adam Nelson (USA)	19.92	20.86	20.19	21.24	X	X	21.24 m	
3rd place, bronze medalist(s)	Arsi Harju (FIN)	20.28	20.01	20.59	20.93	20.10	20.79	20.93 m	SB
4	Manuel Martínez (ESP)	20.78	X	X	20.91	X	X	20.91 m	
5	Dragan Perić (YUG)	20.91	X	20.67	X	X	X	20.91 m	SB
6	Yuriy Bilonoh (UKR)	20.56	20.74	X	20.83	20.83	X	20.83 m	
7	Conny Karlsson (FIN)	20.07	X	20.78	X	19.96	X	20.78 m	PB
8	Bradley Snyder (CAN)	20.63	X	X	X	X	20.34	20.63 m	
9	Ville Tiisanoja (FIN)	20.37	19.95	20.45				20.45 m	
10	Joachim Olsen (DEN)	18.94	20.38	20.24				20.38 m	
11	Janus Robberts (RSA)	20.12	X	20.18				20.18 m	
DQ (10)	Andrey Mikhnevich (BLR)	20.41	X	20.42				20.42 m	Doping

== See also ==
- 2001 Shot Put Year Ranking
- 2002 European Championships
