= 1998 World Junior Championships in Athletics – Men's shot put =

The men's shot put event at the 1998 World Junior Championships in Athletics was held in Annecy, France, at Parc des Sports on 31 July and 1 August. A 7257g (Senior implement) shot was used.

== Medalists ==
Gold	Mikuláš Konopka; Slovakia
Silver	Janus Robberts; South Africa
Bronze	Carl Myerscough; United Kingdom

== Results ==
=== Final ===
1 August

Rank	Name	Nationality	Attempts						Result	Notes
Rank	Name	Nationality	1	2	3	4	5	6	Result	Notes
1st place, gold medalist(s)	Mikuláš Konopka	Slovakia	18.50	17.95	17.72	18.39	x	x	18.50	
2nd place, silver medalist(s)	Janus Robberts	South Africa	16.83	16.50	x	x	18.12	18.15	18.15	
3rd place, bronze medalist(s)	Carl Myerscough	United Kingdom	x	16.24	17.42	18.12	x	x	18.12	
4	Peter Sack	Germany	16.07	17.98	17.72	18.09	17.78	17.34	18.09	
5	Johannes van Wyk	South Africa	17.20	x	17.06	17.35	x	x	17.35	
6	Chris Sprague	United States	16.44	16.68	17.14	16.56	16.65	16.50	17.14	
7	Łukasz Wenta	Poland	16.91	17.01	17.12	16.92	16.37	16.79	17.12	
8	Jhonny Rodríguez	Colombia	17.05	16.95	x	16.44	16.36	15.85	17.05	
9	Ronny Jiménez	Venezuela	16.54	16.49	x				16.54	
10	Leszek Śliwa	Poland	16.46	16.49	x				16.49	
11	Jimmy Nordin	Sweden	16.43	x	x				16.43	
12	Rhys Jones	Australia	x	15.80	16.30				16.30	

=== Qualifications ===
31 Jul

==== Group A ====
Rank	Name	Nationality	Attempts			Result	Notes
Rank	Name	Nationality	1	2	3	Result	Notes
1	Janus Robberts	South Africa	x	17.94	-	17.94	Q
2	Peter Sack	Germany	17.46	-	-	17.46	Q
3	Łukasz Wenta	Poland	14.82	17.04	-	17.04	Q
4	Chris Sprague	United States	16.31	16.32	16.95	16.95	q
5	Ronny Jiménez	Venezuela	16.37	16.88	16.21	16.88	q
6	Jhonny Rodríguez	Colombia	15.97	16.79	16.67	16.79	q
7	Emeka Udechuku	United Kingdom	15.67	16.42	x	16.42	
8	Damjan Verbnjak	Slovenia	15.13	15.54	16.01	16.01	
9	Michal Oertelt	Czech Republic	15.90	x	x	15.90	
10	Ahmed Gholoum	Kuwait	15.39	15.76	15.29	15.76	
11	Anastasis Anastasiou	Cyprus	15.64	15.48	15.70	15.70	
12	Aaron Hartney	Australia	x	15.16	15.65	15.65	
13	Mohamed Abou El-Nasr	Egypt	x	15.23	15.18	15.23	

==== Group B ====
Rank	Name	Nationality	Attempts			Result	Notes
Rank	Name	Nationality	1	2	3	Result	Notes
1	Carl Myerscough	United Kingdom	18.05	-	-	18.05	Q
2	Mikuláš Konopka	Slovakia	16.91	17.82	-	17.82	Q
3	Johannes van Wyk	South Africa	16.39	x	17.28	17.28	Q
4	Leszek Śliwa	Poland	16.06	16.88	17.16	17.16	Q
5	Jimmy Nordin	Sweden	16.67	x	x	16.67	q
6	Rhys Jones	Australia	16.22	x	16.53	16.53	q
7	Van Mounts	United States	16.16	15.85	x	16.16	
8	Hamza Alić	Bosnia and Herzegovina	15.39	15.65	15.98	15.98	
9	Sven-Eric Hahn	Germany	15.79	15.37	15.90	15.90	
10	Hicham Aït Aha	Morocco	15.55	15.29	x	15.55	
11	Navpreet Singh	India	15.25	15.10	15.04	15.25	
12	Ilya Kostin	Russia	x	14.92	x	14.92	
13	Dmitry Kruchenok	Belarus	14.40	x	x	14.40	
14	Pavlos Atmatsidis	Greece	14.19	x	x	14.19	

== Participation ==
According to an unofficial count, 27 athletes from 21 countries participated in the event.

- Australia (2)
- Belarus (1)
- Bosnia and Herzegovina (1)
- Colombia (1)
- Cyprus (1)
- Czech Republic (1)
- Egypt (1)
- Germany (2)
- Greece (1)
- India (1)
- Kuwait (1)
- Morocco (1)
- Poland (2)
- Russia (1)
- Slovakia (1)
- Slovenia (1)
- South Africa (2)
- Sweden (1)
- United Kingdom (2)
- United States (2)
- Venezuela (1)
