= Shot put at the 2004 Summer Olympics =

Shot put at the 2004 Summer Olympics may refer to:

- Athletics at the 2004 Summer Olympics – Men's shot put
- Athletics at the 2004 Summer Olympics – Women's shot put
