= 1999 European Athletics U23 Championships – Men's shot put =

The men's shot put event at the 1999 European Athletics U23 Championships was held in Gothenburg, Sweden, at Ullevi on 29 July 1999.

== Medalists ==
Gold	Mikuláš Konopka; Slovakia
Silver	Joachim Olsen; Denmark
Bronze	Jarkko Haukijärvi; Finland

== Results ==
=== Final ===
29 July

Rank	Name	Nationality	Attempts						Result	Notes
Rank	Name	Nationality	1	2	3	4	5	6	Result	Notes
1st place, gold medalist(s)	Mikuláš Konopka	Slovakia	18.04	x	x	18.15	19.02	19.60	19.60	CR
2nd place, silver medalist(s)	Joachim Olsen	Denmark	x	18.91	x	17.97	19.50	18.52	19.50	
3rd place, bronze medalist(s)	Jarkko Haukijärvi	Finland	18.02	18.21	x	x	19.15	18.56	19.15	
4	Jimmy Nordin	Sweden	18.85	18.98	x	19.08	19.07	x	19.08	
5	Vaios Tiggas	Greece	18.23	18.46	18.51	18.23	x	18.72	18.72	
6	Ralf Bartels	Germany	x	18.34	x	18.53	18.44	x	18.53	
7	Petr Stehlík	Czech Republic	18.36	x	x	17.94	18.31	18.10	18.36	
8	Carl Myerscough	Great Britain	18.09	x	x	17.57	x	x	18.09	
9	Iker Sukia	Spain	17.81	18.00	17.91				18.00	
10	Yves Niaré	France	17.91	x	x				17.91	
11	Mirosław Dec	Poland	17.58	x	x				17.58	
12	Attila Pintér	Hungary	x	15.99	x				15.99	

=== Qualifications ===
29 July
Qualifying 18.40 or 12 best to the Final

==== Group A ====
Rank	Name	Nationality	Result	Notes
1	Jimmy Nordin	Sweden	18.49	Q
2	Petr Stehlík	Czech Republic	18.02	q
3	Mirosław Dec	Poland	17.89	q
4	Yves Niaré	France	17.52	q
5	Mikko Rönkkö	Finland	17.39	
6	Dmitriy Kruchenok	Belarus	17.38	
7	Miran Vodovnik	Slovenia	17.10	
8	Ivan Emelianov	Moldova	16.94	
9	Gjøran Sørli	Norway	16.78	
10	Andriy Borodkin	Ukraine	16.59	
11	Arpad Sinko	Yugoslavia	16.55	

==== Group B ====
Rank	Name	Nationality	Result	Notes
1	Joachim Olsen	Denmark	18.64	Q
2	Carl Myerscough	Great Britain	18.43	Q
3	Attila Pintér	Hungary	18.38	q
4	Vaios Tiggas	Greece	18.28	q
5	Mikuláš Konopka	Slovakia	18.21	q
6	Jarkko Haukijärvi	Finland	18.21	q
7	Ralf Bartels	Germany	18.05	q
8	Iker Sukia	Spain	17.59	q
9	Leszek Śliwa	Poland	17.44	
10	Anders Holmström	Sweden	17.23	
11	Erwin Simpelaar	Netherlands	17.04	

== Participation ==
According to an unofficial count, 22 athletes from 19 countries participated in the event.

- Belarus (1)
- Czech Republic (1)
- Denmark (1)
- Finland (2)
- France (1)
- Germany (1)
- Great Britain (1)
- Greece (1)
- Hungary (1)
- Moldova (1)
- Netherlands (1)
- Norway (1)
- Poland (2)
- Slovakia (1)
- Slovenia (1)
- Spain (1)
- Sweden (2)
- Ukraine (1)
- Yugoslavia (1)
