= Dylan Armstrong =

Canadian shot putter (born 1981)

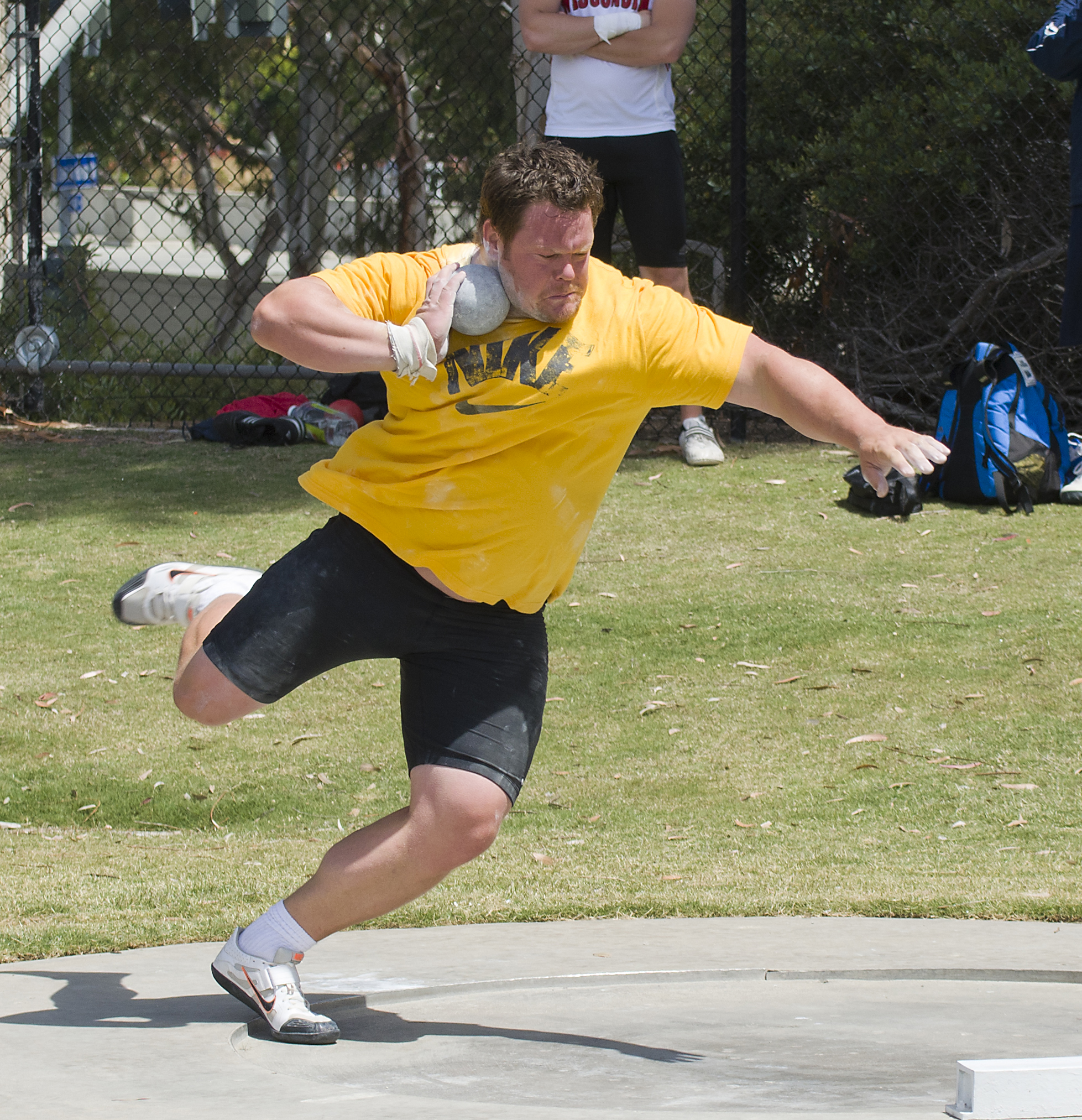
- Armstrong in 2011 at the Triton Invitational where he threw 21.72m (71.3 ft)

Personal information
- Nationality: Canadian
- Born: January 15, 1981 (age 45) Kamloops, British Columbia, Canada
- Height: 6 ft 4 in (1.93 m)
- Weight: 306 lb (139 kg; 21.9 st)

Sport
- Sport: Track and field
- Events: Shot put, hammer throw

Achievements and titles
- Personal bests: SP – 22.21 m NR, Calgary, 2011
Medal record
Men's Athletics
Representing Canada
Olympic Games
Bronze medal – third place	2008 Beijing	Shot put
World Championships
Silver medal – second place	2011 Daegu	Shot put
Bronze medal – third place	2013 Moscow	Shot put
World Indoor Championships
Bronze medal – third place	2010 Doha	Shot put
Commonwealth Games
Gold medal – first place	2010 Delhi	Shot put
Pan American Games
Gold medal – first place	2007 Rio de Janeiro	Shot put
Gold medal – first place	2011 Guadalajara	Shot put
World Junior Championships
Silver medal – second place	2000 Santiago	Hammer throw

Dylan Armstrong (born January 15, 1981) is a Canadian athletics coach and retired competitive shot putter. He is the 2008 Olympic bronze medallist, a two-time World Athletics Championships medallist, a two-time Pan American Games champion, and the 2010 Commonwealth Games champion in that discipline. He was awarded his Olympic bronze medal in 2015, seven years after the event, following the doping disqualification of competitor Andrei Mikhnevich.

Armstrong holds the Canadian national record for the shot put, and is a former holder of the Pan American Games and Commonwealth games records. Armstrong was the first Canadian to reach the podium in a throwing event in a major global competition.

== Career ==
Armstrong competed for the Texas Longhorns men's track and field team in the NCAA in 2001.

Prior to focusing on the shot put in 2004, Armstrong competed in the hammer throw. As a junior, he won a gold medal at the 1999 Pan American Junior Games and a silver medal at the 2000 World Junior Championships. He continues to hold the North American high school and junior records in the hammer throw. His personal best is 71.51 ft, achieved in April 2003 in Walnut.

Armstrong achieved a personal best, and Canadian record at that time, of 21.04 meters at the 2008 Summer Olympics in Beijing, where he finished fourth, missing out on a medal by a single centimetre. However, on August 20, 2014, the Canadian Olympic Committee announced that Armstrong would be awarded the 2008 Summer Olympic bronze medal by the International Olympic Committee. This followed a retroactive lifetime ban for doping violations dating back to 2005 given to Belarusian shot putter Andrei Mikhnevich, who had won the medal initially.

=== Commonwealth and World Championships success ===
28 years after former Canadian national champion Bruno Pauletto won gold at the 1982 Commonwealth Games Armstrong succeeded in reiterating that performance at the 2010 edition of the Games, placing first with a Commonwealth record of 21.02 m. At the 2010 World Indoor Championship, in Doha, Qatar, Dylan placed fourth with a Canadian indoor record of 21.39 m. He improved his outdoor national record to 21.58 m at the Askina Meeting in Baunatal, Germany, beating Ralf Bartels to the victory. When in 2014 Andrei Mikhnevich was stripped of the event's silver medal for doping violations, Armstrong moved up to the bronze medal position.

His first true world success came at the 2011 World Championships in Athletics when he won the silver at the outdoor event for shot put. He threw a 21.64 before David Storl of Germany beat him with a 21.78 on his last throw. Armstrong next attended the 2011 Pan American Games, there he went on to win gold and broke the Pan American Games record with a 21.30. Armstrong finished off the year by winning the Diamond League title in shot put.

As one of Canada's leading medal favourites and only medal favourite in athletics, Armstrong had set a season's best of 21.50 heading into the 2012 Summer Olympics in London. There he finished fifth, falling short of a medal.

=== Olympic bronze medal awarded ===
Prior to the beginning of the 2013 World Athletics Championships, Armstrong was awarded the bronze medal from the 2010 IAAF World Indoor Championships after Andrei Mikhnevich's positive drug test and subsequent forfeiture of his silver medal. At the time the IAAF and IOC had yet to rule on whether Armstrong would as well receive the bronze medal from the 2008 Olympics where he just missed the podium behind Mikhnevich. In an interview regarding the possible return of the medal Armstrong stated that "I worked hard for it, and I want it back...It's my country's medal too, we deserve it." The decision to allocate the Olympic bronze medal to Armstrong was finally announced in January 2015.

After the awarding of his indoor medal, Armstrong began competition at the 2013 World Championships. He qualified for the finals where he threw 21.04 m. In the finals he tossed a season's best 21.34 m. Armstrong acknowledge the importance of sport funding as a result of what was Canada's fourth medal at the World Championships, tying a record from the 1995 World Championships. He said that "I just feel amazing. My coach and I worked really hard, I made some really good choices this year. It's another medal for Canada, it shows that when you have the right coaches in place, the right support and the funding behind it that it's going to pay off. You have to invest in sport, results don't come for free." Armstrong received his medal at a ceremony in his hometown of Kamloops on February 15, 2015, around 700 people attended the event.

Following his competitive career, Armstrong started coaching amateur athletes at the Kamloops Track and Field Club in 2017. He notably guided student Ethan Katzberg to a World title in the men's hammer throw at the 2023 World Athletics Championships.

== Personal life ==
Armstrong lives in Kamloops, British Columbia and trained there during his career at the nearby National Throws Centre with famed coach and Olympic gold medallist Anatoliy Bondarchuk. In September 2015 Armstrong married the Russian shot putter Yevgeniya Kolodko whom he dated since 2012. In a reversal of situations, his wife Kolodko was stripped of all her medals from 2012 to 2016 following positive doping results in 2016 and tests of B samples. Armstrong responded to the issue saying: "News of athlete doping is very disheartening for competitive athletes who are committed to competing clean. I have never condoned doping in sport … I have been consistently outspoken about my position on doping, which is zero tolerance. Today's news is especially difficult as it affects both the Olympic athletic community I am part of – and someone I love deeply: Evgeniia."

== Achievements ==
Year	Competition	Venue	Position	Event	Notes
Representing Canada
2000	World Junior Championships	Santiago, Chile	18th (q)	Discus	49.53 m
2000	World Junior Championships	Santiago, Chile	2nd	Hammer	67.50 m
2001	Jeux de la Francophonie	Ottawa, Ontario, Canada	3rd	Shot put	17.57 m
2001	Jeux de la Francophonie	Ottawa, Ontario, Canada	7th	Hammer	64.91 m
2001	World Championships	Edmonton, Alberta, Canada	31st (q)	Hammer	63.89 m
2007	Pan American Games	Rio, Brazil	1st	Shot	20.10 m
2007	World Championships	Osaka, Japan	8th	Shot	20.23 m
2008	World Indoor Championships	Valencia, Spain	14th (q)	Shot	19.56 m
2008	Olympic Games	Beijing, China	3rd	Shot	21.04 m
2009	World Championships	Berlin, Germany	16th (q)	Shot	19.86 m
2009	World Athletics Final	Thessaloniki, Greece	7th	Shot	19.61 m
2010	World Indoor Championship	Doha, Qatar	3rd	Shot	21.39 m
2010	Commonwealth Games	Delhi, India	1st	Shot	21.02 m
2011	World Championship	Daegu, South Korea	2nd	Shot	21.64 m
2011	Pan American Games	Guadalajara, Mexico	1st	Shot	21.30 m
2012	World Indoor Championship	Istanbul, Turkey	9th (q)	Shot	19.84 m
2012	Olympic Games	London, United Kingdom	5th	Shot	20.93 m
2013	World Championship	Moscow, Russia	3rd	Shot	21.34 m

== See also ==
- Canadian records in track and field
- List of Canadian sports personalities
