= Athletics at the 2008 Summer Olympics – Men's shot put =

Men's shot put at the Games of the XXIX Olympiad
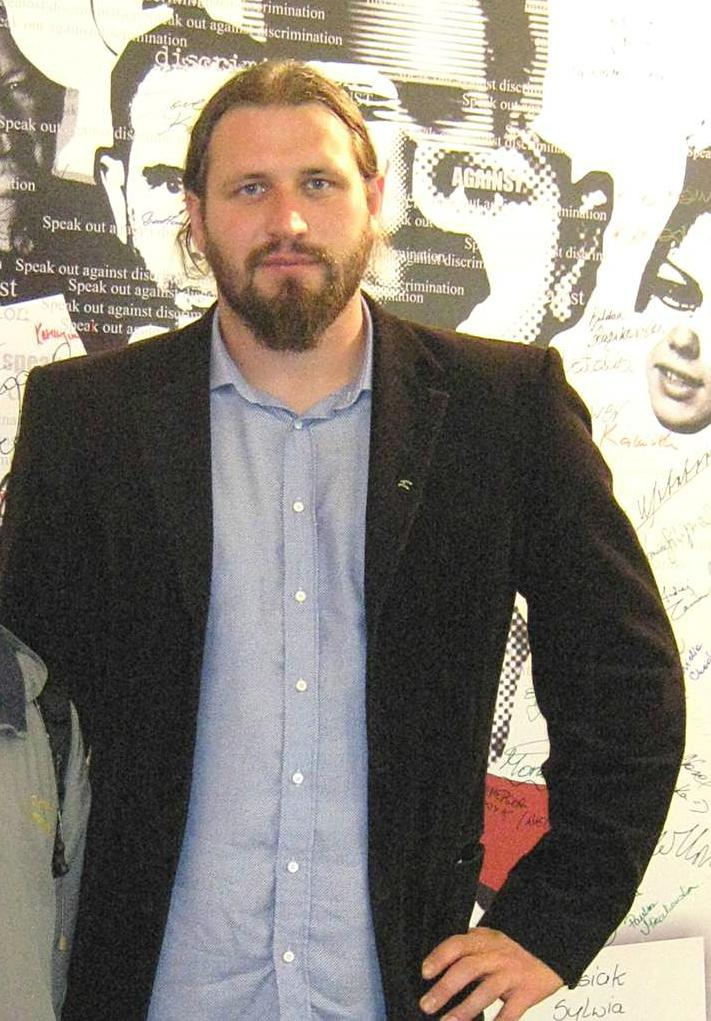
- Tomasz Majewski (2009)
- Venue: Beijing National Stadium
- Date: 15 August 2008
- Competitors: 44 from 34 nations
- Winning distance: 21.51

Medalists
1st place, gold medalist(s)		Tomasz Majewski; Poland
2nd place, silver medalist(s)		Christian Cantwell; United States
3rd place, bronze medalist(s)		Dylan Armstrong; Canada

The men's shot put event at the 2008 Olympic Games took place on 15 August at the Beijing Olympic Stadium. Forty-four athletes from 34 nations competed. The event was won by Tomasz Majewski of Poland, the nation's first victory (and first medal) in the men's shot put since 1972. Christian Cantwell of the United States took silver, the seventh consecutive Games in which an American finished first or second.

Andrei Mikhnevich of Belarus was initially awarded the bronze medal but he was later disqualified for doping and the medal was awarded to 4th-place finisher Dylan Armstrong of Canada. It was Canada's first men's shot put medal.

== Background ==
This was the 26th appearance of the event, which is one of 12 athletics events to have been held at every Summer Olympics. The top eight finishers from 2004 returned: Yuriy Bilonoh of Ukraine (whose 2004 gold medal would later be stripped), Adam Nelson of the United States, Joachim Olsen of Denmark, Manuel Martínez Gutiérrez of Spain, Andrei Mikhnevich and Yury Bialou of Belarus, Justin Anlezark of Australia, and Ralf Bartels of Germany, along with eleventh-place finisher Miran Vodovnik of Slovenia. Nelson had won the 2005 world championships and come in second to Reese Hoffa in 2007. Hoffa, Nelson, and Christian Cantwell were favored, with an American sweep thought to be a "real possibility."

Chinese Taipei, Iran, Jamaica, Portugal, and Serbia each made their debut in the men's shot put. The United States made its 25th appearance, most of any nation, having missed only the boycotted 1980 Games.

== Qualification ==
The qualifying standards were 20.30 m (66.6 ft) (A standard) and 19.80 m (64.96 ft) (B standard). Each National Olympic Committee (NOC) was able to enter up to three entrants providing they had met the A qualifying standard in the qualifying period (1 January 2007 to 23 July 2008). NOCs were also permitted to enter one athlete providing he had met the B standard in the same qualifying period. The maximum number of athletes per nation had been set at 3 since the 1930 Olympic Congress.

== Competition format ==
The competition used the two-round format introduced in 1936, with the qualifying round completely separate from the divided final. In qualifying, each athlete received three attempts; those recording a mark of at least 20.40 metres advanced to the final. If fewer than 12 athletes achieved that distance, the top 12 would advance. The results of the qualifying round were then ignored. Finalists received three throws each, with the top eight competitors receiving an additional three attempts. The best distance among those six throws counted.

== Records ==
Prior to this competition, the existing world and Olympic records were as follows.

World record	Randy Barnes (USA)	23.12	Westwood, United States	20 May 1990
Olympic record	Ulf Timmermann (GDR)	22.47	Seoul, South Korea	23 September 1988

No new world or Olympic records were set for this event. The following national records were set during the competition:

Nation	Athlete	Round	Distance
Canada	Dylan Armstrong	Final	20.43

== Schedule ==
All times are China standard time (UTC+8)

Date	Time	Round
Friday, 15 August 2008	09:00; 21:00	Qualifying; Finals

== Results ==
=== Qualifying round ===
Qualification: 20.40 (Q) or at least 12 best performers (q) advance to the final.

Rank	Group	Athlete	Nation	1	2	3	Distance	Notes
1	A	Tomasz Majewski	Poland	21.04	—	—	21.04	Q, PB
2	B	Adam Nelson	United States	20.56	—	—	20.56	Q
~~3~~	B	Andrei Mikhnevich	Belarus	~~20.38~~	~~20.48~~		~~20.48~~	Q, DPG
4	A	Christian Cantwell	United States	20.11	20.48	—	20.48	Q
5	A	Dylan Armstrong	Canada	20.43	—	—	20.43	Q
6	A	Reese Hoffa	United States	20.41	—	—	20.41	Q
~~7~~	B	Pavel Lyzhyn	Belarus	~~20.36~~	X	X	~~20.36~~	q, DPG
8	A	Pavel Sofin	Russia	20.29	X	X	20.29	q
9	B	Yuriy Bilonog	Ukraine	19.93	20.16	19.57	20.16	q
10	B	Rutger Smith	Netherlands	20.13	X	19.97	20.13	q
11	A	Yury Bialou	Belarus	X	20.12	19.87	20.12	q
~~12~~	B	Ivan Yushkov	Russia	~~20.02~~	~~19.83~~	~~20.00~~	~~20.02~~	q, DPG
13	B	Peter Sack	Germany	19.76	X	20.01	20.01	
14	A	Andriy Semenov	Ukraine	18.95	19.59	20.01	20.01	
15	B	Dorian Scott	Jamaica	19.54	19.94	19.71	19.94	
16	B	Justin Anlezark	Australia	19.91	19.75	x	19.91	
17	A	Hamza Alic	Bosnia and Herzegovina	19.33	19.48	19.87	19.87	
18	A	Anton Lyuboslavskiy	Russia	19.14	X	19.87	19.87	
19	B	Manuel Martínez	Spain	19.62	19.45	19.81	19.81	
20	B	Miran Vodovnik	Slovenia	18.72	X	19.81	19.81	
21	A	Scott Martin	Australia	19.75	X	X	19.75	
22	A	Joachim Olsen	Denmark	19.62	19.69	19.74	19.74	SB
23	B	Yves Niare	France	X	X	19.73	19.73	
24	A	Carlos Véliz	Cuba	19.58	19.25	19.16	19.58	
25	A	Māris Urtāns	Latvia	18.78	19.57	19.34	19.57	
26	B	Taavi Peetre	Estonia	X	X	19.57	19.57	
27	B	Sultan Abdulmajeed Al-Hebshi	Saudi Arabia	X	18.67	19.51	19.51	
28	B	Petr Stehlik	Czech Republic	X	19.41	X	19.41	
29	B	Nedzad Mulabegovic	Croatia	19.11	19.35	18.88	19.35	
30	A	Milan Haborák	Slovakia	X	19.32	X	19.32	
31	B	Reinaldo Proenza	Cuba	19.15	19.06	19.20	19.20	
32	A	Germán Lauro	Argentina	19.07	X	18.96	19.07	
33	A	Asmir Kolašinac	Serbia	18.32	X	19.01	19.01	
34	A	Lajos Kürthy	Hungary	18.38	X	18.74	18.74	
35	B	Ivan Emilianov	Moldova	18.64	18.27	X	18.64	
36	A	Mihail Stamatoyiannis	Greece	X	18.45	18.30	18.45	
37	B	Yasser Farag Ibrahim	Egypt	18.37	X	18.42	18.42	
38	B	Marco Fortes	Portugal	X	X	18.05	18.05	
39	A	Marco Antonio Verni	Chile	X	17.96	X	17.96	
40	B	Chang Ming-Huang	Chinese Taipei	16.13	16.98	17.43	17.43	
—	A	Robert Häggblom	Finland	X	X	X	No mark	
—	A	Georgi Ivanov	Bulgaria	X	X	X	No mark	
—	B	Alexis Paumier	Cuba	X	X	X	No mark	
—	B	Amin Nikfar	Iran	X	X	X	No mark	
—	A	Ralf Bartels	Germany	DNS				

=== Final ===
Rank	Athlete	Nation	1	2	3	4	5	6	Distance	Notes
1st place, gold medalist(s)	Tomasz Majewski	Poland	20.80	20.47	21.21	21.51	X	20.44	21.51	PB
2nd place, silver medalist(s)	Christian Cantwell	United States	20.39	20.98	20.88	20.86	20.69	21.09	21.09	
3rd place, bronze medalist(s)	Dylan Armstrong	Canada	20.62	21.04	X	X	20.47	X	21.04	NR
4	Yuriy Bilonog	Ukraine	20.63	X	20.53	20.46	20.31	X	20.63	SB
5	Reese Hoffa	United States	X	19.81	20.53	20.38	X	X	20.53	
6	Pavel Sofin	Russia	20.42	X	X	X	X	X	20.42	
7	Rutger Smith	Netherlands	20.41	X	20.30	Did not advance			20.41	
8	Yury Bialou	Belarus	20.06	X	X	Did not advance			20.06	
—	Adam Nelson	United States	X	X	X	Did not advance			No mark	
—	Andrei Mikhnevich	Belarus	~~20.73~~	~~21.05~~	X	~~20.78~~	~~20.57~~	~~20.93~~	~~21.05~~	DPG
—	Ivan Yushkov	Russia	~~19.67~~	~~19.55~~	X	Did not advance			~~19.67~~	DPG
—	Pavel Lyzhyn	Belarus	~~20.33~~	~~20.15~~	~~20.98~~	~~20.98~~	~~20.40~~	X	~~20.98~~	DPG
