= Simon Patrick Stewart =

Biographical details
- Born: January 28, 1980 (age 46); Pierre, South Dakota

Playing career

Shot Put
- 2001-2006: Idaho

Coaching career (HC unless noted)

Shot Put
- 2007–2009: Joachim B. Olsen

Shot put
- 2008–2011: Trine Mulbjerg

Basketball
- 2009-: Bakken Bears Phys. coach

Archery
- 2010-: Danish Archery Federation Phys. coach

Accomplishments and honors

Records
- Joachim B. Olsen: 21.61 (shot put); Bakken Bears: Danish National Championships 2010/11 (basketball)

Simon Patrick Stewart (born January 28, 1980) is a professional coach and retired Shot putter from United States. Now lives in Århus, Denmark.

== Coaching career ==
Technical Coach

- Shot put: Trine Mulbjerg, Coach, Elite Center West
- Discus, Coach, Elite Center West
- Hammer throw, Coach, Elite Center West

Physical Coach

- Bakken Bears basketball.
- Martin Kirketerp Olympian gold medalist, 2008 Beijing, 49er class
- Danish Archery Federation Elite coach.

== Competitive and professional career ==
| Year | Competition | Venue | Position | Notes |
Representing United States
| 2002 | NCAA Division I Men's Outdoor Track and Field Championships | Baton Rouge, LA | 3rd | 63.11 ft |
| 2003 | NCAA Division I Men's Indoor Track and Field Championships | Fayetteville, Arkansas | 8th | 18.85 m |
| 2004 | 2004 Danish National Championships, outdoor | | 1st | 18.54 m |
| 2005 | 2005 Danish National Championships, indoor | | 1st | 17.91 m |
| 2005 | 2005 Danish National Championships, outdoor | | 1st | 18.10 m |
