= Athletics at the 2007 Pan American Games – Men's shot put =

Men's shot put at the Pan American Games

The men's shot put event at the 2007 Pan American Games was held on July 24.

== Results ==
Rank	Athlete	Nationality	#1	#2	#3	#4	#5	#6	Result	Notes
1st place, gold medalist(s)	Dylan Armstrong	Canada	19.81	20.10	x	20.05	x	x	20.10	
2nd place, silver medalist(s)	Dorian Scott	Jamaica	19.63	20.06	20.02	19.95	20.00	19.59	20.06	
3rd place, bronze medalist(s)	Carlos Véliz	Cuba	19.20	18.32	19.03	19.75	19.36	19.32	19.75	PB
4	Garrett Johnson	United States	18.76	18.72	19.67	x	x	x	19.67	
5	Germán Lauro	Argentina	19.44	19.43	x	19.49	x	x	19.49	
6	Marco Antonio Verni	Chile	18.54	x	18.42	17.93	x	18.09	18.54	
7	Alexis Paumier	Cuba	18.14	18.32	x	x	18.47	x	18.47	
8	Yojer Medina	Venezuela	17.69	18.10	17.97	x	18.02	x	18.10	
9	Carlos García Córdoba	Colombia	17.61	17.26	16.40				17.61	
10	Ronald Julião	Brazil	16.72	17.31	x				17.31	
11	Gustavo Mendonça	Brazil	16.49	17.27	16.75				17.27	
12	Kimani Kirton	Jamaica	16.74	16.69	x				16.74	
13	Tyron Benjamin	Dominica	16.29	16.64	x				16.64	
