= Peter Sack =

German shot putter (born 1979)

Peter Sack (born 27 July 1979 in Schkeuditz, Bezirk Leipzig) is a German shot putter.

He finished fourth at the 1998 World Junior Championships and won the bronze medal at the 1999 European Junior Championships behind Ralf Bartels and Mikuláš Konopka. He also competed at the 2004 Olympic Games and the 2006 World Indoor Championships without reaching the finals. At the 2007 World Championships his three throws in the qualification round were all invalid, causing him to miss the final again. At the 2008 World Indoor Championships he finished eighth. He then competed at his second Olympic Games, but did not reach the final.

His personal best throw is 21.19 metres, achieved in May 2008 in Versmold.
