= Stevimir Ercegovac =

Croatian shot putter

Personal information
- Born: 20 January 1974 (age 52) Zagreb, SR Croatia, Yugoslavia

Sport
- Sport: Track and field
Medal record
Representing Croatia
Summer Universiade
Bronze medal – third place	1999 Palma de Mallorca	Shot put
Mediterranean Games
Bronze medal – third place	1997 Bari	Shot put

Stevimir Ercegovac (born 20 January 1974) is a former Croatian shot putter, who represented his native country at the 2000 Summer Olympics in Sydney, Australia. His personal best is 20.28 metres, thrown in 2000 in Rijeka.

Ercegovac attended Taylor University from 1998 to 2002 and was NAIA National Shot Put Champion in each of those years. He also holds the NAIA shot put outdoor record at 20.06m.

== Competition record ==
Year	Competition	Venue	Position	Notes
Representing Croatia
1997	Mediterranean Games	Bari, Italy	3rd	19.00 m
1997	World Championships	Athens, Greece	19th (q)	19.00 m
1997	Universiade	Catania, Italy	14th	18.10 m
1999	Universiade	Palma de Mallorca, Spain	3rd	19.94 m
2000	Olympic Games	Sydney, Australia	24th (q)	18.98 m
2001	Universiade	Beijing, China	6th	19.29 m
