= Yves Niaré =

French shot putter (1977–2012)

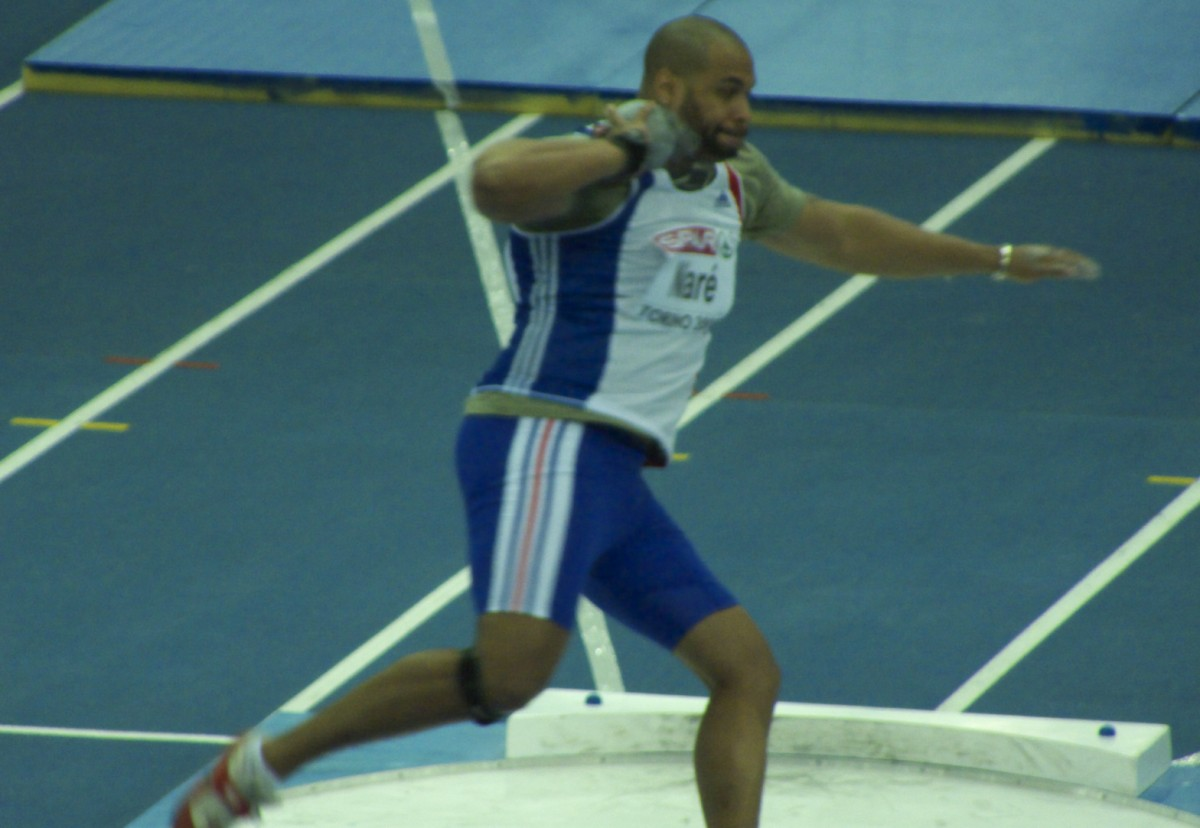
- Niaré in action at the 2009 European Indoor Championships

Personal information
- Nationality: French
- Born: 20 July 1977 Saint-Maurice, France
- Died: 5 December 2012 (aged 35) France

Sport
- Sport: Track and field
- Event: Shot put

Yves Niaré (20 July 1977 – 5 December 2012) was a shot putter from France.

== Career ==
Niaré was born in Saint-Maurice, Val-de-Marne. He father was Malian shot putter Namakoro Niaré. His main honor was the silver medal at the 2009 European Indoor Championships with a throw of 20.42 metres. He also finished eleventh at the 1996 World Junior Championships, and fourth at the 2009 Mediterranean Games.

Niaré competed at the 2001 World Championships, the 2006 European Championships, the 2007 World Championships, the 2008 Olympic Games and the 2009 World Championships without reaching the final.

His personal best throw in the shot put was 20.72 metres, a French national record, achieved in May 2008 in Versailles. He also had 63.44 metres in the discus throw, achieved in May 2007 in Chelles.

He was the brother of French High Jumper Gaëlle Niaré.

== Death ==
Niaré was killed on the morning of 5 December 2012 in an automobile accident. A statement regarding his death was issued by the French Athletics Federation. He was 35.

== Competition record ==
| Year | Competition | Venue | Position | Event | Notes |
Representing France
| 1995 | European Junior Championships | Nyíregyháza, Hungary | 10th | Shot put | 15.64 m |
| 1995 | European Junior Championships | Nyíregyháza, Hungary | 8th | Discus throw | 49.74 m |
| 1996 | World Junior Championships | Sydney, Australia | 11th | Shot put | 16.12 m |
| 1996 | World Junior Championships | Sydney, Australia | 12th | Discus throw | 47.18 m |
| 1997 | European U23 Championships | Turku, Finland | 15th (q) | Shot put | 16.90 m |
| 1997 | European U23 Championships | Turku, Finland | 15th (q) | Discus throw | 50.34 m |
| 1999 | European U23 Championships | Gothenburg, Sweden | 10th | Shot put | 17.91 m |
| 1999 | European U23 Championships | Gothenburg, Sweden | 12th | Discus throw | 53.58 m |
| 2001 | Jeux de la Francophonie | Ottawa, Canada | 2nd | Shot put | 18.94 m |
| 2001 | World Championships | Edmonton, Canada | 26th (q) | Shot put | 18.71 m |
| 2001 | Mediterranean Games | Radès, Tunisia | 5th | Shot put | 18.13 m |
| 2005 | Jeux de la Francophonie | Niamey, Niger | 1st | Shot put | 18.64 m |
| 2005 | Jeux de la Francophonie | Niamey, Niger | 1st | Discus throw | 54.15 m |
| 2006 | European Championships | Gothenburg, Sweden | 20th (q) | Shot put | 18.70 m |
| 2007 | World Championships | Osaka, Japan | 15th (q) | Shot put | 19.62 m |
| 2008 | Olympic Games | Beijing, China | 23rd (q) | Shot put | 19.73 m |
| 2009 | European Indoor Championships | Turin, Italy | 2nd | Shot put | 20.42 m (iNR) |
| 2009 | Mediterranean Games | Pescara, Italy | 4th | Shot put | 19.71 m |
| 2009 | World Championships | Berlin, Germany | 26th (q) | Shot put | 19.37 m |
| 2010 | European Championships | Barcelona, Spain | – | Shot put | NM |
