= Hamza Alić =

Bosnian shot putter (born 1979)

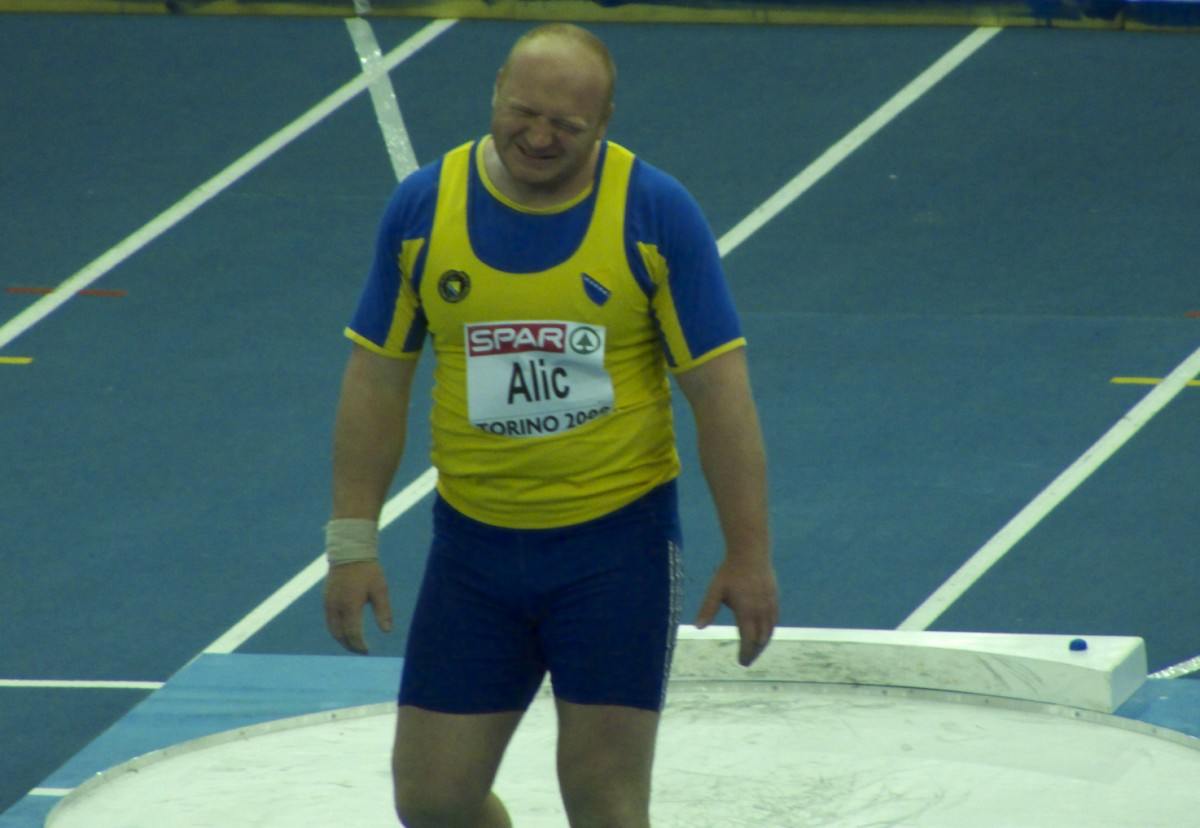
- Hamza Alić at the 2009 European Athletics Indoor Championships in Turin

Personal information
- Nationality: Bosnian
- Born: 20 January 1979 (age 47) Srebrenica, SR Bosnia and Herzegovina, SFR Yugoslavia
- Height: 1.86 m (6 ft 1 in)
- Weight: 127 kg (280 lb)

Sport
- Country: Bosnia and Herzegovina
- Sport: Track and field
- Event: Shot put
- Club: AK Zenica

Achievements and titles
- Olympic finals: 17th - 2008 Summer Olympics
- Personal bests: Outdoor: 21.07 m Indoor: 20.34 m
Medal record
Representing Bosnia and Herzegovina
European Indoor Championships
Silver medal – second place	2013 Gothenburg	Shot put
Mediterranean Games
Gold medal – first place	2018 Tarragona	Shot Put
Silver medal – second place	2009 Pescara	Shot Put
Bronze medal – third place	2005 Almería	Shot Put
Bronze medal – third place	2013 Mersin	Shot Put

Hamza Alić (born 20 January 1979) is a Bosnian shot putter. On 1 March 2013, at 2013 European Athletics Indoor Championships, he won a silver medal which he dedicated to all the people of Bosnia and Herzegovina to coincide with the Bosnia and Herzegovina Independence Day.

His personal best throw is 21.07 m (69 ft 1 1/2 in), achieved in April 2008 in Podgorica.

== Competition record ==
Year	Competition	Venue	Position	Notes
Representing Bosnia and Herzegovina
1997	European Junior Championships	Ljubljana, Slovenia	24th (q)	14.29 m
1998	World Junior Championships	Annecy, France	16th (q)	15.98 m
2002	European Championships	Munich, Germany	24th (q)	17.29 m
2005	Mediterranean Games	Almeria, Spain	3rd	19.49 m
2005	World Championships	Helsinki, Finland	22nd (q)	18.77 m
2006	World Indoor Championships	Moscow, Russia	16th (q)	18.15 m
2006	European Championships	Gothenburg, Sweden	25th (q)	18.15 m
2007	World Championships	Osaka, Japan	–	NM
2008	World Indoor Championships	Valencia, Spain	8th (q)	20.00 m
2008	Olympic Games	Beijing, China	17th (q)	19.87 m
2009	European Indoor Championships	Turin, Italy	11th (q)	19.41 m
2009	Mediterranean Games	Pescara, Italy	2nd	20.05 m
2009	World Championships	Berlin, Germany	8th	20.00 m
2011	European Indoor Championships	Paris, France	9th (q)	19.60 m
2011	World Championships	Daegu, South Korea	17th (q)	19.70 m
2012	World Indoor Championships	Istanbul, Turkey	20th (q)	18.80 m
2012	European Championships	Istanbul, Turkey	17th (q)	19.03 m
2013	European Indoor Championships	Gothenburg, Sweden	2nd	20.34 m
2013	Mediterranean Games	Mersin, Turkey	3rd	19.69 m
2013	World Championships	Moscow, Russia	19th (q)	19.18 m
2014	European Championships	Zürich, Switzerland	19th (q)	19.36 m
2015	European Indoor Championships	Prague, Czech Republic	–	NM
2015	European Games (Note: The third league of the 2015 European Team Championships)	Baku, Azerbaijan	1st	20.26
2015	World Championships	Beijing, China	28th (q)	18.62 m
2016	European Championships	Amsterdam, Netherlands	13th (q)	19.61 m
2016	Olympic Games	Rio de Janeiro, Brazil	26th (q)	19.48 m
2017	World Championships	London, United Kingdom	32nd (q)	18.95 m
2018	Mediterranean Games	Tarragona, Spain	1st	20.43 m
2018	European Championships	Berlin, Germany	20th (q)	19.34 m
