= Marco Antonio Verni =

Chilean shot putter (born 1976)

Personal information
- Born: 27 February 1976 (age 50) Santiago, Chile

Sport
- Sport: Track and field
Medal record
Representing Chile
South American Games
Gold medal – first place	1998 Cuenca	Shot put
Silver medal – second place	1998 Cuenca	Discus throw
Pan American Games
Silver medal – second place	2003 Santo Domingo	Shot put
South American Championships
Gold medal – first place	2001 Manaus	Shot put
Gold medal – first place	2003 Barquisimeto	Shot put
Gold medal – first place	2005 Cali	Shot put
Silver medal – second place	1997 Mar del Plata	Shot put
Silver medal – second place	1999 Bogotá	Shot put
Silver medal – second place	2006 Tunja	Shot put
Silver medal – second place	2007 São Paulo	Shot put
Ibero-American Championships
Gold medal – first place	2002 Guatemala City	Shot put
Silver medal – second place	2004 Huelva	Shot put
Bronze medal – third place	2006 Ponce	Shot put

Marco Antonio Verni Lippi (born 27 February 1976) is a Chilean shot putter. His personal best throw is 21.14 metres, achieved in July 2004 in Santiago.

== Biography ==
He is a multiple South American champion, finished eleventh at the 2001 Summer Universiade and won the silver medal at the 2003 Pan American Games. He also competed at the World Championships in 2001, 2003, 2005 and 2007, the Olympic Games in 2004 and 2008 as well as the 2004 World Indoor Championships without reaching the final.

Verni held the South American Record with 21.14 metres until 2013.

== Competition record ==
Year	Competition	Venue	Position	Event	Notes
Representing Chile
1994	South American Junior Championships	Santa Fe, Argentina	3rd	Shot put	13.82 m
1994	South American Junior Championships	Santa Fe, Argentina	6th	Discus throw	37.28 m
1995	Pan American Junior Championships	Santiago, Chile	2nd	Shot put	16.23 m
1995	Pan American Junior Championships	Santiago, Chile	5th	Discus throw	45.60 m
1995	South American Junior Championships	Santiago, Chile	1st	Shot put	16.04 m
1995	South American Junior Championships	Santiago, Chile	3rd	Discus throw	44.02 m
1997	South American Championships	Mar del Plata, Argentina	2nd	Shot put	16.82 m
1997	South American Championships	Mar del Plata, Argentina	6th	Discus throw	48.56 m
1997	Universiade	Catania, Italy	19th (q)	Shot put	15.74 m
1997	Universiade	Catania, Italy	23rd (q)	Discus throw	46.64 m
1998	Ibero-American Championships	Lisbon, Portugal	7th	Shot put	16.81 m
1998	South American Games	Cuenca, Ecuador	1st	Shot put	17.76 m A
1998	South American Games	Cuenca, Ecuador	2nd	Discus	51.88 m A
1999	South American Championships	Bogotá, Colombia	2nd	Shot put	17.83 m
1999	Universiade	Palma de Mallorca, Spain	16th (q)	Shot put	16.23 m
1999	Pan American Games	Winnipeg, Canada	6th	Shot put	16.65 m
2000	Ibero-American Championships	Rio de Janeiro, Brazil	4th	Shot put	18.10 m
2000	Ibero-American Championships	Rio de Janeiro, Brazil	8th	Discus	48.48 m
2001	South American Championships	Manaus, Brazil	1st	Shot put	18.57 m
2001	South American Championships	Manaus, Brazil	4th	Discus	49.56 m
2001	World Championships	Edmonton, Canada	25th (q)	Shot put	18.85 m
2001	Universiade	Beijing, China	11th	Shot put	18.31 m
2002	Ibero-American Championships	Guatemala City, Guatemala	1st	Shot put	19.79 m
2002	Ibero-American Championships	Guatemala City, Guatemala	5th	Discus	50.68 m
2003	South American Championships	Barquisimeto, Venezuela	1st	Shot put	20.23 m
2003	Pan American Games	Santo Domingo, Dominican Republic	2nd	Shot put	20.14 m
2003	World Championships	Paris, France	21st (q)	Shot put	19.24 m
2004	World Indoor Championships	Budapest, Hungary	15th (q)	Shot put	19.61 m
2004	Ibero-American Championships	Huelva, Spain	2nd	Shot put	20.17 m
2004	Olympic Games	Athens, Greece	–	Shot put	NM
2005	South American Championships	Cali, Colombia	1st	Shot put	18.43 m
2005	World Championships	Helsinki, Finland	23rd (q)	Shot put	18.60 m
2006	Ibero-American Championships	Ponce, Puerto Rico	3rd	Shot put	18.48 m
2006	South American Championships	Tunja, Colombia	2nd	Shot put	18.62 m
2007	South American Championships	São Paulo, Brazil	2nd	Shot put	19.22 m
2007	Pan American Games	Rio de Janeiro, Brazil	6th	Shot put	18.54 m
2007	World Championships	Osaka, Japan	27th (q)	Shot put	18.68 m
2008	Ibero-American Championships	Iquique, Chile	4th	Shot put	18.23 m
2008	Olympic Games	Beijing, China	39th (q)	Shot put	17.96 m
2009	South American Championships	Lima, Peru	4th	Shot put	17.45 m
