= 2000 World Junior Championships in Athletics – Men's hammer throw =

The men's hammer throw event at the 2000 World Junior Championships in Athletics was held in Santiago, Chile, at Estadio Nacional Julio Martínez Prádanos on 18 October. A 7257g (senior implement) hammer was used.

== Medalists ==
Gold	Eşref Apak; Turkey
Silver	Dylan Armstrong; Canada
Bronze	Aaron Fish; Australia

== Results ==
=== Final ===
18 October

Rank	Name	Nationality	Attempts						Result	Notes
Rank	Name	Nationality	1	2	3	4	5	6	Result	Notes
1st place, gold medalist(s)	Eşref Apak	Turkey	67.25	69.97	68.40	67.57	68.53	66.58	69.97	
2nd place, silver medalist(s)	Dylan Armstrong	Canada	66.98	62.80	67.24	63.45	67.50	66.82	67.50	
3rd place, bronze medalist(s)	Aaron Fish	Australia	66.14	x	64.79	x	66.72	67.44	67.44	
4	Aleksey Yeliseyev	Russia	x	64.37	x	65.08	65.82	62.19	65.82	
5	Dilshod Nazarov	Tajikistan	63.43	60.95	x	x	62.29	61.30	63.43	
6	Alessandro Beschi	Italy	58.29	x	61.58	x	60.44	x	61.58	
7	Jari Polvi	Finland	59.38	58.86	57.01	58.95	60.15	58.73	60.15	
8	Lucas Andino	Argentina	57.01	58.69	56.75	x	x	57.65	58.69	
9	Nick Welihozkiy	United States	55.81	58.32	x				58.32	
10	Michael Gusbeth	Australia	57.74	56.88	x				57.74	
11	Frédéric Pouzy	France	57.31	x	50.78				57.31	
12	Steffen Neurohr	Germany	57.28	57.16	x				57.28	
13	Drew Matthews	Canada	55.14	53.85	57.20	55.23	x	x	57.20	
14	Fabián Di Paolo	Argentina	x	54.47	56.15				56.15	
15	Roberto Sáez	Chile	54.59	x	55.22				55.22	

== Participation ==
According to an unofficial count, 14 athletes from 12 countries participated in the event.

- Argentina (2)
- Australia (2)
- Canada (2)
- Chile (1)
- Finland (1)
- France (1)
- Germany (1)
- Italy (1)
- Russia (1)
- Tajikistan (1)
- Turkey (1)
- United States (1)
