= Joachim B. Olsen =

Danish politician and shot putter

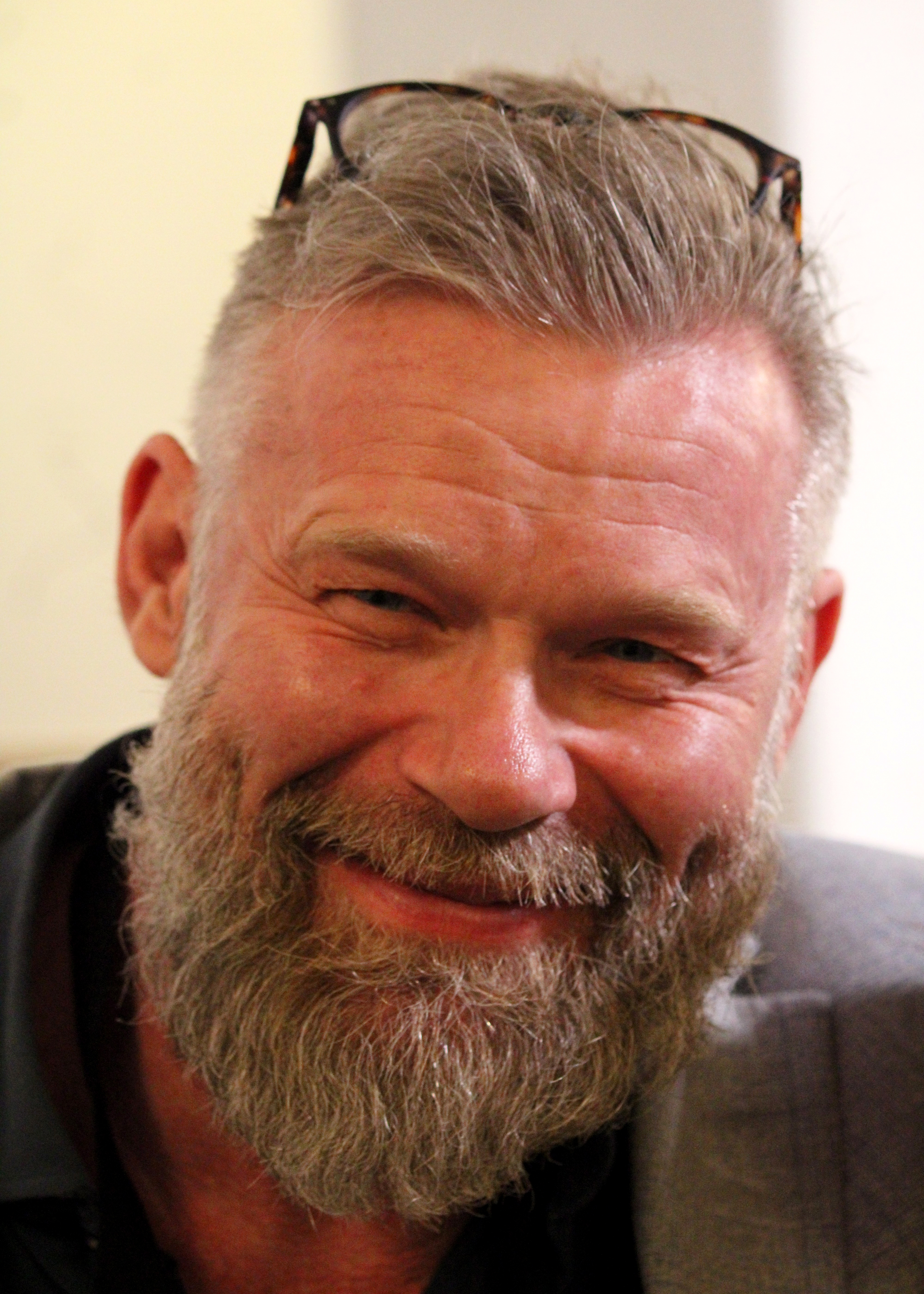
- Olsen in 2026

Member of the Folketing
- In office 15 September 2011 – 5 June 2019

Personal details
- Born: Joachim Brøchner Olsen; 31 May 1977 (age 49) Aalborg, Denmark
- Party: Liberal Alliance (until 2020)
- Spouse: Karen Westergaard (m. 2013)
- Sports career
- Height: 1.84 m (6 ft 0 in)
- Sport: Shot put
- Coached by: Vesteinn Hafsteinsson; Simon Patrick Stewart
Medal record
Men's athletics
Representing Denmark
Olympic Games
Silver medal – second place	2004 Athens	Shot put
World Indoor Championships
Bronze medal – third place	2004 Budapest	Shot put
Bronze medal – third place	2006 Moscow	Shot put
European Championships
Silver medal – second place	2002 Munich	Shot put
Bronze medal – third place	2006 Gothenburg	Shot put
European Indoor Championships
Gold medal – first place	2005 Madrid	Shot put
Silver medal – second place	2002 Vienna	Shot put
Bronze medal – third place	2007 Birmingham	Shot put

Joachim Brøchner Olsen (born 31 May 1977) is a Danish former politician and former world-class shot putter. He was elected to the Danish parliament at the 2011 election, representing the Liberal Alliance in the Greater Copenhagen constituency.

As an athlete, he represented Århus 1900. With ten straight international finals, Joachim holds the longest string of appearances in finals at Olympic, World and European Championships among throwers.

From October 2003, Olsen was coached by former Olympic finalist Vesteinn Hafsteinsson. From February 2007 until Olsen ended his career in July 2009, Olsen was coached by Simon Patrick Stewart.

== Biography ==
Olsen was born in Aalborg. He went to the Sct. Mariæ Skole in Aalborg from 1984 to 1994. In 1998, he became a student at the Nørresundby Gymnasium & HF. He then studied history for four years at the University of Idaho from 1999 to 2002.

Olsen participated in the Unibet Open in Prague in 2010.

He married Karen Westergaard in 2013. They have two children. The couple divorced in 2022.

== Athletic career ==
Olsen began practicing athletics in his teens in the late 1980s for the Aalborg AK. Olsen primarily focused on the discus throw, but after switching shot put technique from the glide style to the rotational style, he improved dramatically during his four years at the University of Idaho, where he was coached by Tim Taylor.

Olsen achieved his first national victory at the age of 16 during the Danish National Indoor Youth Championships. The following year, at 17, while still in the youth category, he claimed both the national titles in shot put (16.08 meters) and discus throw (56.88 meters). Transitioning to the junior category in 1995, he clinched the national championship in shot put, using a 6 kg implement, both indoors (14.23 meters) and outdoors (15.17 meters).

Although he appeared at the World Junior Championships in Sydney 1996, where he threw the Discus, it was at the U23 European Championships in Gothenburg in 1999 he made his first international impact, winning a silver medal. At the 2000 Summer Olympics in Sydney, Olsen did not qualify for the final. Nevertheless, he received worldwide attention after he wrote in a chat room that the winner of the final, Arsi Harju had failed a doping test. The rumour was false, and the incident caused the Danish National Olympic Committee to send Joachim B. Olsen home prior to the closing of the Games.

At the 2001 World Championships in Athletics, Olsen qualified for his first international final. Since then he has qualified for every final at Olympic, World and European Championships.

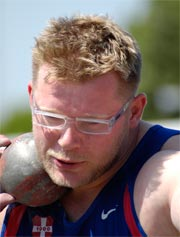
Olsen during 2004 Summer Olympics

In 2002 Olsen won the silver medal at the European Championships outdoor as well as indoor. In 2003 a hand injury held him back, but a revised training plan removed the pain in his wrist. Thus Olsen was ready for a comeback in 2004, and at the 2004 IAAF World Indoor Championships he won a Bronze medal - a placement he repeated at the Olympic Games in Athens. But because of a positive doping of the gold medalist Yuri Bilonog (Ukraine), which caused the cancellation of the medal, Olsen inherited the silver medal after the announcement of redistributing medals.

On 6 November 2005 Olsen injured his right ankle during practise. Several ligaments were either torn or severely damaged. On 6 February 2006 he announced, that the injury had healed sufficiently for him to compete again at highest level. A month later, at the World Indoor Championships, he managed to win a bronze medal with a throw of 21.16 metres.

On 8 August 2008 at the opening ceremony of the Beijing Olympics, Olsen was the flagbearer for Denmark. He failed to reach the final.

In 2008 Joachim Olsen became well known in the Danish publicity by his participation in, and winning of, the fifth season of the Danish version of Dancing with the Stars.

On 22 July 2009, he announced his withdrawal from shot putting, saying that while he had a dream of competing at the 2012 Summer Olympics, his physical condition would not allow it. He suffered a slipped disc in April 2009.

== Political career ==
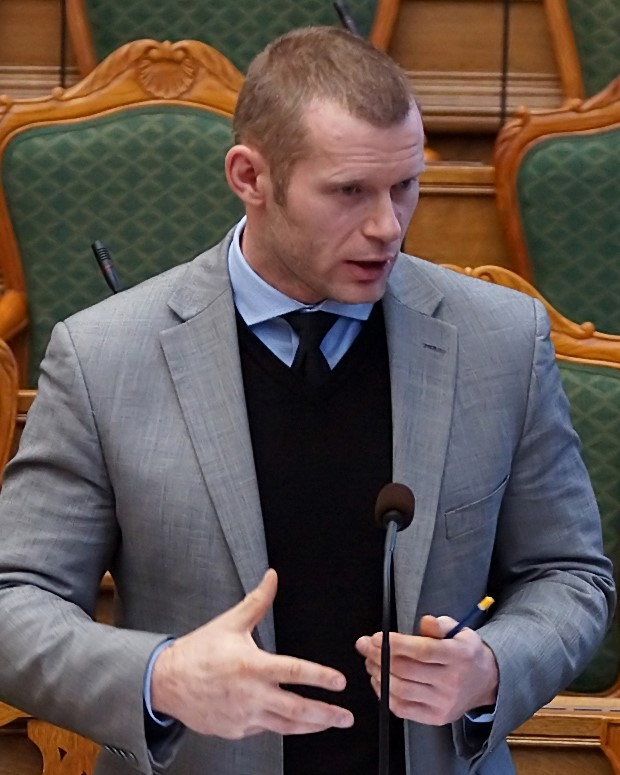
Olsen speaking in the Folketing in 2012

After retiring from athletics in 2009, Olsen transitioned into politics. The same year, he backed Nicolai Wammen, from the Social Democrats, in Aarhus' municipal elections. A prominent Danish politician, Anders Samuelsen, encouraged Olsen to collaborate with the Liberal Alliance party, which subsequently nominated Olsen for the Folketing elections in 2011. Olsen won a seat in the Folketing with a total result of 1,932 personal votes. In 2015, Olsen was re-elected to the Folketing with 4,259 votes.

As part of his campaign for the 2019 general election, Olsen placed his ad on the pornographic website, Pornhub. Olsen failed to gain the necessary votes to be re-elected, as the Liberal Alliance lost nine seats.

== Achievements ==
Year	Competition	Venue	Position	Event	Notes
Representing Denmark
1996	World Junior Championships	Sydney, Australia	23rd (q)	Discus	46.26 m
1999	European U23 Championships	Gothenburg, Sweden	2nd	Shot put	19.50 m
1999	European U23 Championships	Gothenburg, Sweden	11th	Discus	54.97 m
1999	World Championships	Seville, Spain	22nd (q)	Shot put	19.13 m
2000	Olympic Games	Sydney, Australia	17th (q)	Shot put	19.41 m
2001	World Championships	Edmonton, Canada	11th	Shot put	20.38 m
2002	European Indoor Championships	Vienna, Austria	2nd	Shot put	21.23 m
2002	European Championships	Munich, Germany	2nd	Shot put	21.16 m
2003	World Indoor Championships	Birmingham, United Kingdom	8th	Shot put	20.12 m
2003	World Championships	Paris, France	9th (q)	Shot put	20.14 m
2004	World Indoor Championships	Budapest, Hungary	3rd	Shot put	20.99 m
2004	Olympic Games	Athens, Greece	2nd	Shot put	21.07 m
2005	European Indoor Championships	Madrid, Spain	1st	Shot put	21.19 m
2005	World Championships	Helsinki, Finland	5th	Shot put	20.73 m
2006	World Indoor Championships	Moscow, Russia	2nd	Shot put	21.16 m
2006	European Championships	Gothenburg, Sweden	2nd	Shot put	21.09 m
2007	European Indoor Championships	Birmingham, United Kingdom	3rd	Shot put	20.55 m
2007	World Championships	Osaka, Japan	4th (q)	Shot put	20.62 m
2008	Olympic Games	Beijing, China	22nd (q)	Shot put	19.74 m
