= Rutger Smith =

Dutch track and field athlete

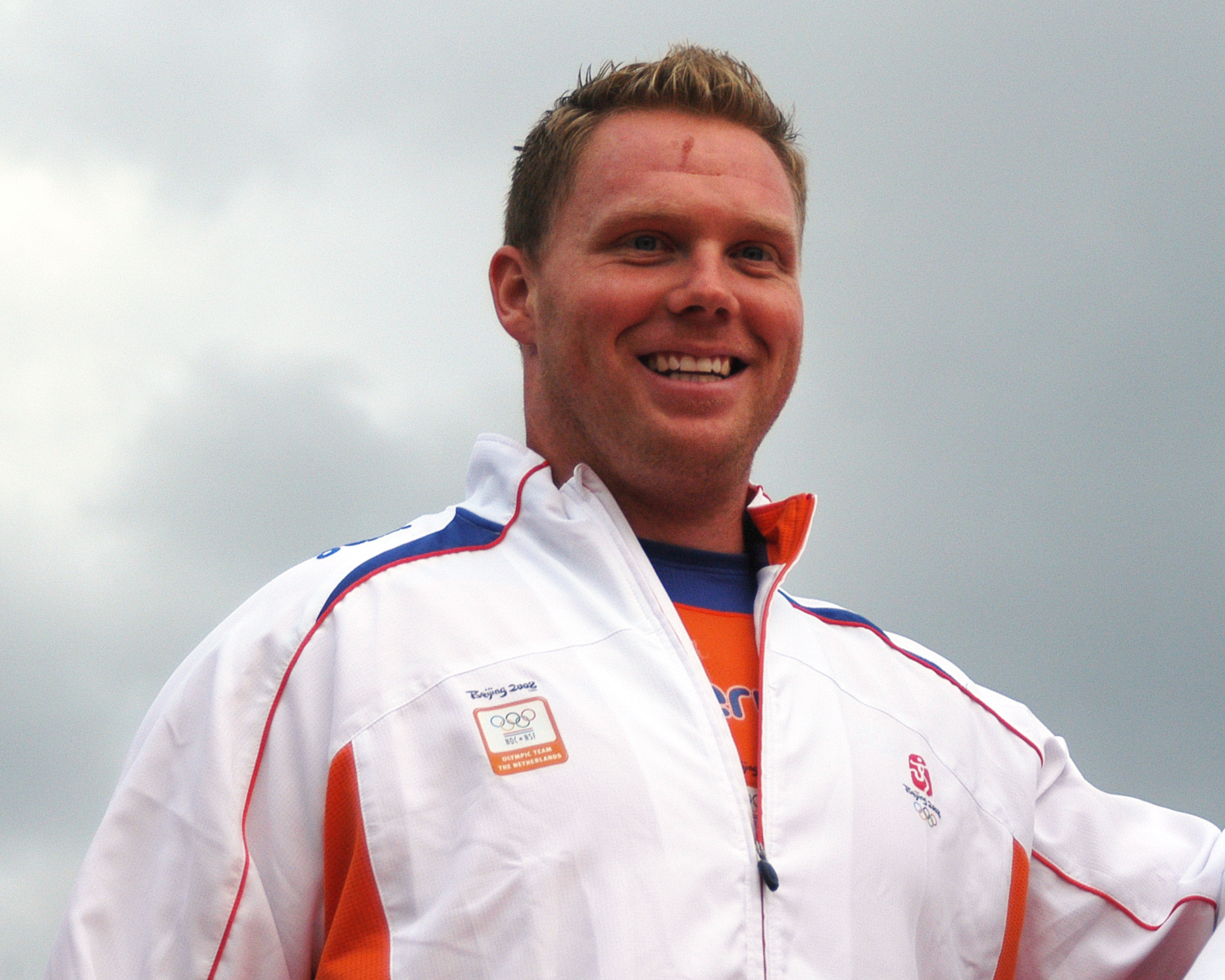
- Rutger Smith in 2008

Personal information
- Full name: Rutger Smith
- Born: 9 July 1981 (age 45) Groningen, Netherlands
- Years active: 1987-2018
- Height: 1.97 m (6 ft 6 in)
- Weight: 129 kg (284 lb; 20.3 st)

Achievements and titles
- Personal bests: shot put – 21.62 (2006) discus throw – 67.63 (2007) hammer throw – 60.85 (2001)
Medal record
Men's athletics
Representing the Netherlands
World Championships
Silver medal – second place	2005 Helsinki	Shot put
Bronze medal – third place	2007 Osaka	Discus
Bronze medal – third place	2007 Osaka	Shot put
European Championships
Silver medal – second place	2012 Helsinki	Shot put
Bronze medal – third place	2006 Gothenburg	Shot put
Bronze medal – third place	2012 Helsinki	Discus
European Cup Winter Throwing
Gold medal – first place	2008 Split	Shot Put
- Updated on 1 November 2008

Rutger Smith (born 9 July 1981) is a Dutch retired track and field athlete who competed in the shot put and discus throw. He is the first athlete to win medals at the World Championships in both events. He represented the Netherlands at the Summer Olympics in 2004, 2008 and 2012. His personal best of 21.62 m for the shot put is the Dutch national record.

In his first international competition, he won a shot put and discus double at the 1999 European Athletics Junior Championships. At the 2000 World Junior Championships he won medals in both events, and he also competed in both events at the 2004 Olympics. In 2005 he won silver medals in shot put at the European Indoor Championships and World Championships. Two years later he won the bronze medal in the discus at the 2007 World Championships and narrowly missed a shot put medal with a fourth-place finish.

A series of back problems affected his throwing after he competed at the 2008 Beijing Olympics and he did not return to competition until April 2011.

Since then he has competed at the 2012 Summer Olympics, and won a silver medal at the shot put in the 2012 European Championships. He also finished fourth in the men's discus at the same championships. This result was later upgraded to bronze after the disqualification of Zoltán Kővágó.

== Achievements ==
Year	Competition	Venue	Position	Event	Notes
1999	European Junior Championships	Riga, Latvia	1st	Shot put	18.27 m
1999	European Junior Championships	Riga, Latvia	1st	Discus throw	52.89 m
2000	World Junior Championships	Santiago, Chile	1st	Shot put	19.48 m
2000	World Junior Championships	Santiago, Chile	3rd	Discus throw	58.70 m
2001	Universiade	Beijing, China	12th	Shot put	18.17 m
2001	Universiade	Beijing, China	11th	Discus throw	55.70 m
2002	European Indoor Championships	Vienna, Austria	10th (q)	Shot put	19.60 m
2002	European Championships	Munich, Germany	8th	Shot put	19.73 m
2003	World Indoor Championships	Birmingham, United Kingdom	10th (q)	Shot put	19.59 m
2003	European U23 Championships	Bydgoszcz, Poland	3rd	Shot put	20.18 m
2003	European U23 Championships	Bydgoszcz, Poland	1st	Discus throw	59.90 m
2003	World Championships	Paris, France	25th (q)	Shot put	19.02 m
2003	World Championships	Paris, France	15th (q)	Discus throw	61.55 m
2004	World Indoor Championships	Budapest, Hungary	14th (q)	Shot put	19.67
2004	Olympic Games	Athens, Greece	13th (q)	Shot put	19.69 m
2004	Olympic Games	Athens, Greece	17th (q)	Discus throw	61.11 m
2005	European Indoor Championships	Madrid, Spain	2nd	Shot put	20.79 m
2005	World Championships	Helsinki, Finland	2nd	Shot put	21.29 m
2006	European Championships	Gothenburg, Sweden	3rd	Shot put	20.90 m
2006	European Championships	Gothenburg, Sweden	7th	Discus throw	64.46 m
2006	World Athletics Final	Stuttgart, Germany	3rd	Shot put	20.74 m
2007	European Indoor Championships	Birmingham, United Kingdom	8th (q)	Shot put	19.19 m
2007	World Championships	Osaka, Japan	3rd	Shot put	21.13 m
2007	World Championships	Osaka, Japan	3rd	Discus throw	66.42 m
2007	World Athletics Final	Stuttgart, Germany	5th	Shot put	20.01 m
2008	World Indoor Championships	Valencia, Spain	4th	Shot put	20.78 m
2008	Olympic Games	Beijing, China	8th	Shot put	20.41 m
2008	Olympic Games	Beijing, China	7th	Discus throw	65.39 m
2011	World Championships	Daegu, South Korea	16th (q)	Discus throw	62.12 m
2012	World Indoor Championships	Istanbul, Turkey	7th	Shot put	20.30 m
2012	European Championships	Helsinki, Finland	2nd	Shot put	20.55 m
2012	European Championships	Helsinki, Finland	3rd	Discus throw	64.02 m
2012	Olympic Games	London, United Kingdom	14th (q)	Shot put	20.08 m
2012	Olympic Games	London, United Kingdom	16th (q)	Discus throw	63.09 m
2016	European Championships	Amsterdam, Netherlands	11th	Discus throw	59.99 m

=== Personal bests ===
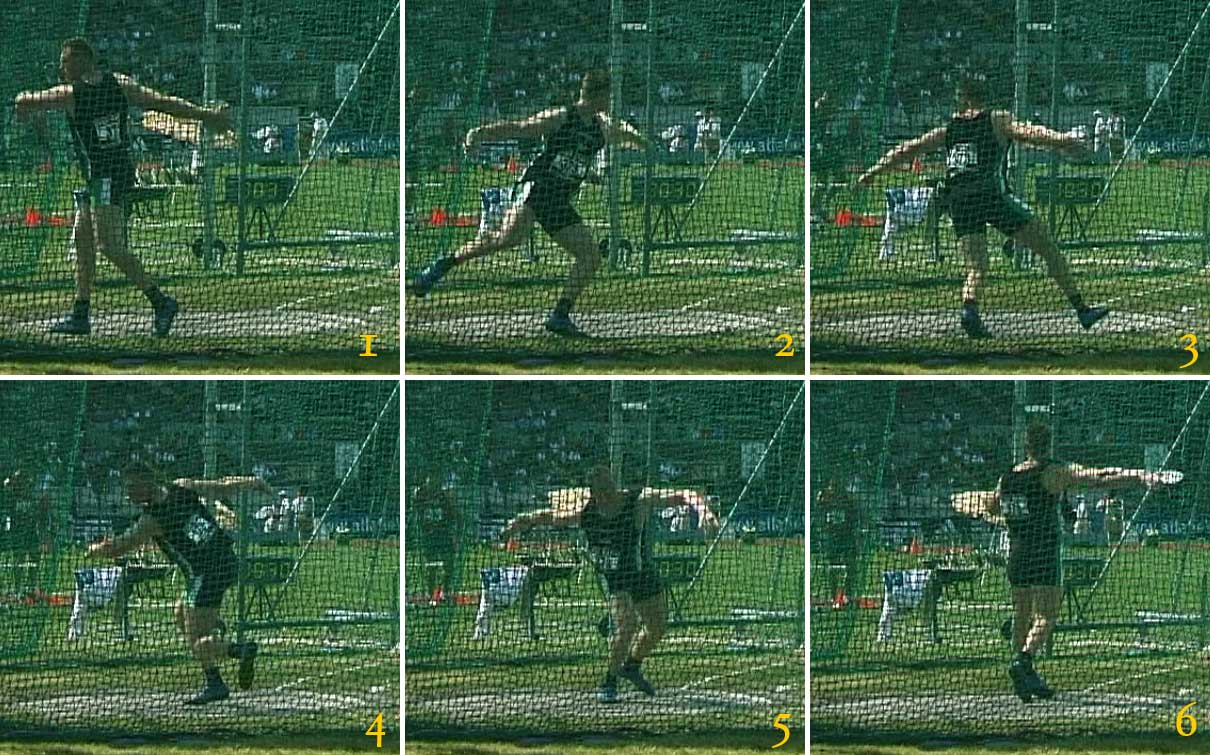
Smith in phases of the discus throw, June 2007

- Shot put – 21.62 m (2006), NR
- Discus throw – 67.77 m (2011)

Awards
Preceded by Bram Som	Men's Dutch Athlete of the Year; 2007, 2008	Succeeded by Martijn Nuijens
