= Petr Stehlík =

Czech shot putter

Petr Stehlík (born 15 April 1977 in Turnov) is a Czech shot putter. His personal best throw is 20.96 metres, achieved in May 2004 in Turnov. The Czech record is currently held by Remigius Machura with 21.93 metres.

He finished fifth at the 2002 European Indoor Championships and twelfth at the 2004 Olympic Games. He also competed at the World Championships in 2001, 2003, 2005 and 2007 as well as the 2008 Olympic Games without reaching the finals.

== Achievements ==
| Year | Competition | Venue | Position | Event | Notes |
Representing the Czech Republic
| 1996 | World Junior Championships | Sydney, Australia | 4th | Shot put | 17.35 m |
| 1996 | World Junior Championships | Sydney, Australia | 24th (q) | Discus throw | 45.84 m |
| 1997 | European U23 Championships | Turku, Finland | 10th | Shot put | 17.66 m |
| 1999 | European U23 Championships | Gothenburg, Sweden | 7th | Shot put | 18.36 m |
| 2001 | World Championships | Edmonton, Canada | 15th (q) | Shot put | 19.68 m |
| 2002 | European Indoor Championships | Vienna, Austria | 5th | Shot put | 19.86 m |
| 2002 | European Championships | Munich, Germany | — | Shot put | NM |
| 2003 | World Championships | Paris, France | 15th (q) | Shot put | 19.70 m |
| 2004 | Olympic Games | Athens, Greece | 11th | Shot put | 19.21 m |
| 2005 | European Indoor Championships | Madrid, Spain | 14th (q) | Shot put | 19.36 m |
| 2005 | World Championships | Helsinki, Finland | 16th (q) | Shot put | 19.48 m |
| 2007 | World Championships | Osaka, Japan | 19th (q) | Shot put | 19.51 m |
| 2008 | Olympic Games | Beijing, China | 28th (q) | Shot put | 19.41 m |
