= Athletics at the 2004 Summer Olympics – Men's shot put =

Men's shot put at the Games of the XXVIII Olympiad
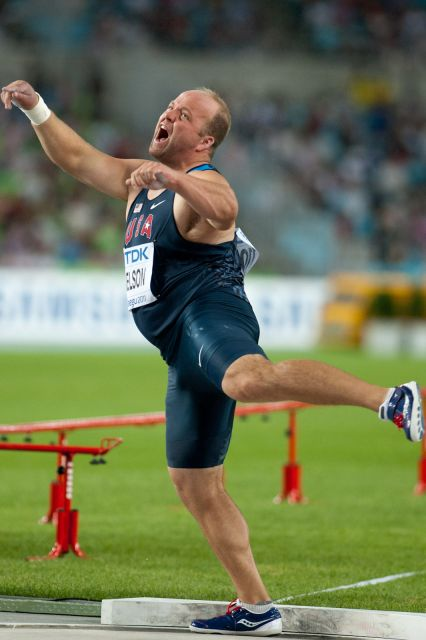
- Adam Nelson (2011)
- Venue: Ancient Olympia Stadium
- Dates: 18 August
- Competitors: 39 from 26 nations
- Winning distance: 21.16

Medalists
1st place, gold medalist(s)		Adam Nelson	United States
2nd place, silver medalist(s)		Joachim Olsen	Denmark
3rd place, bronze medalist(s)		Manuel Martínez	Spain

The men's shot put at the Athens 2004 Summer Olympics was held on August 18, 2004, at the Ancient Olympia Stadium in Olympia, Greece. It was originally planned to hold the discus throw at this venue, but it was discovered that the field was insufficiently large to accommodate the range of modern discus throwers, and would have posed a danger to spectators. As such, it was decided instead to hold the shot put at the site, despite the fact that the shot put was not contested at the Ancient Olympic Games. All distances are given in metres. Thirty-nine athletes from 26 nations competed.

Ukrainian shot putter Yuriy Bilonoh was stripped of his gold medal on 5 December 2012 after drug re-testings of his samples were found positive. After the announcement of the disqualification, there was a new distribution of medals on 5 March 2013. According to a statement from the IOC, sent to the Spanish Olympic Committee, the gold medal went to original silver medalist Adam Nelson of the United States, the silver to Joachim Olsen of Denmark, and the bronze to Manuel Martínez of Spain. This gave the United States its 17th victory in the men's shot put, and Denmark and Spain their first medals in the event. Nelson was the 13th man to win a second shot put medal, adding to his 2000 silver.

== Background ==
This was the 25th appearance of the event, which is one of 12 athletics events to have been held at every Summer Olympics. The returning finalists from the 2000 Games were silver medalist Adam Nelson and bronze medalist John Godina of the United States, fifth-place finisher Yuriy Bilonoh of Ukraine, sixth-place finisher Manuel Martínez Gutiérrez of Spain, seventh-place finisher Janus Robberts of South Africa, and ninth-place finisher Andrey Mikhnevich of Belarus. Mikhnevich, Nelson, and Bilonoh (in that order) had medaled at the 2003 world championships. Nelson had also finished second at the 2001 worlds.

Serbia and Montenegro and Slovenia both made their debut in the men's shot put. The United States made its 24th appearance, most of any nation, having missed only the boycotted 1980 Games.

== Qualification ==
The qualification period for Athletics was 1 January 2003 to 9 August 2004. For the men's shot put, each National Olympic Committee was permitted to enter up to three athletes that had thrown 20.30 metres or further during the qualification period. The maximum number of athletes per nation had been set at 3 since the 1930 Olympic Congress. If an NOC had no athletes that qualified under that standard, one athlete that had thrown 20.00 metres or further could be entered.

== Competition format ==
Each athlete received three throws in the qualifying round. All who achieved the qualifying distance of 20.40 metres progressed to the final. If fewer than twelve athletes achieved this mark, then the twelve furthest throwing athletes reached the final. Each finalist was allowed three throws in the last round, with the top eight athletes after that point being given three further attempts.

== Records ==
Prior to the competition, the existing world and Olympic records were as follows.

World record	Randy Barnes (USA)	23.12	Los Angeles, United States	20 May 1990
Olympic record	Ulf Timmermann (GDR)	22.47	Seoul, South Korea	23 September 1988

No new world or Olympic records were set during the competition.

== Schedule ==
All times are Greece Standard Time (UTC+2)

Date	Time	Round
Wednesday, 18 August 2004	10:00; 17:30	Qualification; Final

== Results ==
=== Qualifying round ===
Rule: Qualifying standard 20.40 (Q) or at least 12 best qualified (q).

Rank	Group	Athlete	Nation	1	2	3	Distance	Notes
1	A	Adam Nelson	United States	X	21.15	—	21.15	Q
2	B	Joachim Olsen	Denmark	20.78	—	—	20.78	Q
3	A	Ralf Bartels	Germany	20.65	—	—	20.65	Q
~~4~~	A	Yuriy Bilonoh	Ukraine	~~20.61~~	—	—	~~20.61~~	Q, DPG
5	B	John Godina	United States	19.73	20.53	—	20.53	Q
6	A	Justin Anlezark	Australia	18.53	20.45	—	20.45	Q
7	B	Manuel Martínez Gutiérrez	Spain	19.15	19.54	20.37	20.37	q
8	B	Mikuláš Konopka	Slovakia	20.32	20.20	X	20.32	q
9	A	Andrei Mikhnevich	Belarus	20.10	20.11	20.09	20.11	q
10	A	Petr Stehlík	Czech Republic	X	19.74	20.06	20.06	q
11	B	Yury Bialou	Belarus	X	X	20.06	20.06	q
12	B	Miran Vodovnik	Slovenia	18.83	20.04	X	20.04	q
13	B	Tepa Reinikainen	Finland	18.27	19.71	19.74	19.74	
14	A	Rutger Smith	Netherlands	19.02	19.28	19.69	19.69	
15	A	Gheorghe Guşet	Romania	19.42	19.26	19.68	19.68	
16	A	Ivan Yushkov	Russia	19.15	19.42	19.67	19.67	
17	B	Pavel Lyzhyn	Belarus	x	x	19.60	19.60	
18	B	Tomasz Majewski	Poland	19.55	19.07	X	19.55	
19	B	Ville Tiisanoja	Finland	19.28	19.50	X	19.50	
20	B	Bradley Snyder	Canada	19.36	19.46	X	19.46	
21	B	Janus Robberts	South Africa	19.41	X	X	19.41	
22	A	Reese Hoffa	United States	18.88	X	19.40	19.40	
23	A	Pavel Chumachenko	Russia	19.17	19.38	X	19.38	
24	B	Zsolt Bíber	Hungary	19.31	X	X	19.31	
25	A	Ivan Emilianov	Moldova	18.83	18.92	19.25	19.25	
26	A	Taavi Peetre	Estonia	19.14	18.97	X	19.14	
27	A	Antonín Žalský	Czech Republic	18.93	19.09	X	19.09	
28	B	Peter Sack	Germany	19.09	17.91	X	19.09	
29	A	Nedžad Mulabegović	Croatia	X	18.86	19.07	19.07	
30	B	Khalid Habash Al-Suwaidi	Qatar	X	X	19.04	19.04	
31	B	Pavel Sofin	Russia	18.78	19.02	X	19.02	
32	B	Dragan Perić	Serbia and Montenegro	18.91	18.79	18.74	18.91	
33	A	Detlef Bock	Germany	18.40	18.89	X	18.89	
34	B	Burger Lambrechts	South Africa	18.67	18.63	X	18.67	
35	A	Roman Virastyuk	Ukraine	18.12	18.40	18.52	18.52	
36	B	Edis Elkasević	Croatia	17.54	18.44	X	18.44	
37	A	Galin Kostadinov	Bulgaria	17.75	17.51	17.47	17.75	
—	A	Marco Antonio Verni	Chile	X	X	X	No mark	
—	A	Bahadur Singh Sagoo	India	X	X	X	No mark	

=== Final ===
Nelson put the shot 21.16 metres on his first throw of the final, but that would be his only legal mark. He led until the very end; Bilonoh had thrown 21.15 on both of his first two throws. The two were the last to throw in the sixth and final set, with Bilonoh before Nelson. Bilonoh's last throw was 21.16 metres—matching Nelson, but giving the Ukrainian the lead because the tie-breaker was second-best throw (and the American had no legal second-best). Nelson had one final chance to throw another 21.16 or better, but again fouled as he threw a 21.30 that did not count. It was the fourth consecutive major championship that Nelson finished second (2000 Olympics, 2001 and 2003 world championships).

Bilonoh would be later stripped of his medal for doping and Nelson promoted to gold medalist.

Rank	Athlete	Nation	1	2	3	4	5	6	Distance	Notes
1st place, gold medalist(s)	Adam Nelson	United States	21.16	X	X	X	X	X	21.16	
2nd place, silver medalist(s)	Joachim Olsen	Denmark	20.47	20.48	21.07	20.78	X	X	21.07	
3rd place, bronze medalist(s)	Manuel Martínez Gutiérrez	Spain	20.70	20.21	20.48	20.78	20.84	X	20.84	
4	Andrei Mikhnevich	Belarus	19.41	20.51	X	X	20.60	X	20.60	
5	Yury Bialou	Belarus	20.34	20.33	X	X	X	19.88	20.34	
6	Justin Anlezark	Australia	20.07	X	20.31	X	X	X	20.31	
7	Ralf Bartels	Germany	20.26	X	X	20.07	X	20.00	20.26	
8	John Godina	United States	X	X	20.19	Did not advance			20.19	
9	Mikuláš Konopka	Slovakia	x	19.92	19.91	Did not advance			19.92	
10	Miran Vodovnik	Slovenia	19.34	18.93	X	Did not advance			19.34	
11	Petr Stehlík	Czech Republic	18.72	X	19.21	Did not advance			19.21	
—	Yuriy Bilonoh	Ukraine	~~21.15~~	~~21.15~~	~~21.07~~	~~X~~	~~X~~	~~21.16~~	~~21.16~~	DPG
