= Jimmy Nordin =

Swedish folk singer and ex-shot putter (born 1979)

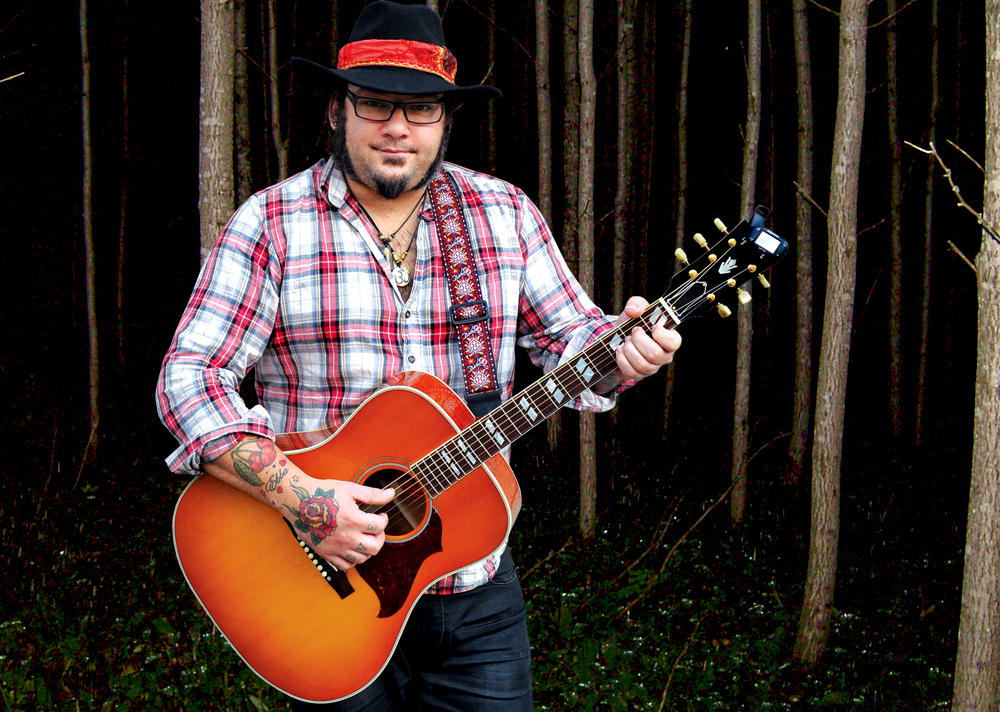
Jimmy Nordin in 2012.

Lars "Jimmy" Morgan Nordin (born 19 October 1979 in Falun) is a Swedish folk singer and ex-shot putter. His biggest athletics achievements were the finals of the 2002 European Indoor Championships and 2002 European Championships.

He is a seven-time Swedish national shot put champion (1999–2002, 2004–2006). His shot put personal best of 20.73 metres, set in 2002, puts him third on the Swedish all-time list.

== Athletics competition record ==
Year	Competition	Venue	Position	Notes
Representing Sweden
1997	European Junior Championships	Ljubljana, Slovenia	20th (q)	15.28 m
1998	World Junior Championships	Annecy, France	11th	16.43 m
1999	European U23 Championships	Gothenburg, Sweden	4th	19.08 m
2000	European Indoor Championships	Ghent, Belgium	–	NM
2001	European U23 Championships	Amsterdam, Netherlands	4th	19.04 m
2001	World Championships	Edmonton, Canada	24th (q)	18.85 m
2002	European Indoor Championships	Vienna, Austria	7th	19.69 m
2002	European Championships	Munich, Germany	11th	19.12 m
2005	European Indoor Championships	Madrid, Spain	–	NM
2006	European Championships	Gothenburg, Sweden	24th (q)	18.35 m

== Personal bests ==
Outdoor

- Shot put – 20.73 (Ludvika 2002)
- Discus throw – 47.37 (Karlstad 2005)

Indoor

- Shot put – 19.96 (Malmö 2001)
