= Adam Nelson =

American shot putter (born 1975)

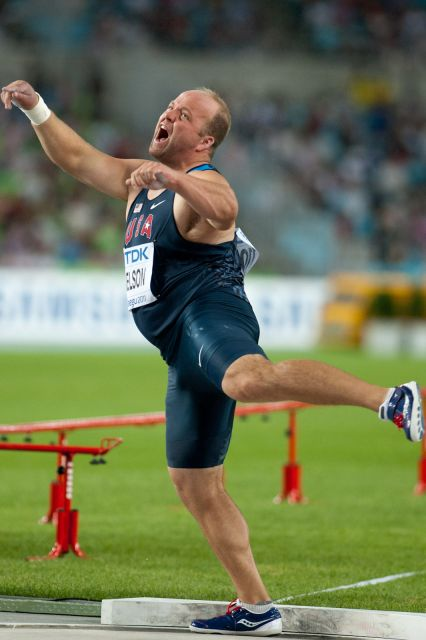
- Nelson at the 2011 World Championships

Personal information
- Full name: Adam McCright Nelson
- Born: July 7, 1975 (age 51) Atlanta, Georgia, U.S.
- Height: 6 ft 0 in (183 cm)
- Weight: 255 lb (116 kg)

Sport
- Country: United States
- Sport: Track and field
- Event: Shot put
- Coached by: Carrie Lane

Achievements and titles
- Personal bests: 22.51 m (outdoor); 22.40 m (indoor)
Medal record
Men's athletics
Representing the United States
Olympic Games
Gold medal – first place	2004 Athens	Shot put
Silver medal – second place	2000 Sydney	Shot put
World Championships
Gold medal – first place	2005 Helsinki	Shot put
Silver medal – second place	2001 Edmonton	Shot put
Silver medal – second place	2003 Paris	Shot put
Silver medal – second place	2007 Osaka	Shot put
IAAF World Athletics Final
Gold medal – first place	2005 Monaco	Shot put
Silver medal – second place	2004 Monaco	Shot put
Silver medal – second place	2007 Stuttgart	Shot put
Summer Universiade
Silver medal – second place	1999 Palma de Mallorca	Shot put

Adam McCright Nelson (born July 7, 1975) is a retired American shot putter and Olympic gold medalist. Nelson competed in three consecutive Olympic Games in 2000, 2004 and 2008. In addition to his gold medal at the 2004 Summer Olympics, Nelson won a silver medal at the 2000 Summer Olympics.

He is married to Laci Nelson and he has 2 daughters, Caroline and Lauren Nelson.

== Personal life ==
Adam Nelson was born in Atlanta, Georgia. He attended The Lovett School in Atlanta where he was a letterman and a standout in football and track and field. Nelson graduated from Lovett in 1993 and moved on to Dartmouth College, graduating from the Ivy League school in 1997. As an undergraduate at Dartmouth, Nelson earned various accolades as a member of the track and field team, including the collegiate shot put title at the 1997 NCAA championships with a throw of 19.62 m (64 ft 4 in).

Nelson holds the Dartmouth shot put record with a throw of 65 feet 3 inches (19.89 m). In addition to shot put, Nelson played football at Dartmouth, as a linebacker and later, as a defensive tackle. In 1993 he became the first freshman ever to play football on the Dartmouth squad. Prior to 1993, the Ivy League prohibited first-year students from playing on the varsity football team. Nelson was a member of Dartmouth's 1996 undefeated Ivy League champion team.

At Dartmouth, Adam Nelson served as President of Chi Heorot fraternity.

Prior to his own Olympics experience, Nelson worked at a concession stand during the 1996 Summer Olympics in his hometown of Atlanta.

== International career ==
Adam Nelson earned a silver medal In the 2000 Summer Olympics in Sydney, Australia, Prior to the Games, Nelson was considered the favorite to win gold. He had won the title in every major shot put event leading up to the Olympic Games that summer including the 2000 Olympic Trials. At the 2000 Games, his throw of 21.21 metres (69 feet 7 inches) was three inches (7.6 cm) short of the winning throw of gold medalist, Arsi Harju of Finland.

Nelson's personal best in the shot put is 22.51 metres (73 feet 10 inches), which he threw in 2002. At that time, this was the third-longest throw in U.S. history and the ninth-farthest ever in the world.

At the 2004 Summer Olympics in Athens, Greece the shot put was held in a spectacular setting at the original Stadium of Ancient Olympia, bringing Olympic competition back to the venue for the first time in over a millennium.

In Athens, Nelson jumped out in front of the field with his first round throw of 21.16 metres (69 feet 5 inches). He held the lead going into the final round, despite fouling throws in rounds 2, 3, 4 and 5. As the event leader, Nelson was the last to throw in the sixth and final round. The current second-place thrower, Yuriy Bilonog of Ukraine, stepped up on his final throw and improved with a throw of 21.16 metres (69 feet 5 inches) to tie Nelson for first place. Nelson entered the ring for his final throw to break the tie. He unleashed what looked to be initially a gold medal-winning 70-foot throw, but Nelson was flagged for stepping on the line to the left-front of the circle. Nelson protested vociferously to the officials at the time of the call, but later apologized for his emotional reaction.

With Nelson and Bilonog precisely tied on distance after six-rounds, the tie-breaker rule came into effect, counting the competitors' second-best throws. Because Nelson had fouled on each throw after the opening round, he had no second mark. Yuriy Bilonog was awarded the gold medal; Nelson was awarded his second consecutive Olympic silver medal. Nelson's shot put Silver was the first track and field medal for the United States in the 2004 Summer Olympics.

Nelson's silver medal in the shot put at the 2004 Summer Olympics was upgraded to a gold medal retroactively in 2013 after Yuriy Bilonog's urine sample tested positive for performance-enhancing drug use. With the advent of drug testing at international athletic competitions, it has become increasingly common for athlete disqualifications from placements in standings months or years after the event conclusions.

At the 2005 World Athletics Championships, Nelson won his first major world title with a throw of 21.73 meters (71 feet 4 inches). Two years later, he won a silver medal at the 2007 World Athletics Championships with a throw of 21.61 meters (70 feet 11 inches). At the 2008 Summer Olympics in Beijing, Nelson failed to throw a valid mark in the final. In the qualifying round, Nelson had a throw of 20.56 meters (67 feet 5 inches). At the 2009 and 2011 World Athletics Championships, Nelson failed to medal in the finals, finishing 5th and 8th place, respectively.

Nelson attempted to make the U.S. Olympic Team for a fourth time at the 2012 United States Olympic Trials, but did not make the final round in wet conditions.

== 2013 elevation to Olympic gold medal ==
In 2012, retroactive testing on competitors' urine samples retained from the 2004 Olympic Games by the International Olympic Committee revealed that 2004 Olympic gold medalist Yuriy Bilonog of Ukraine was guilty of performance-enhancing drug use. In 2012, the IOC re-tested approximately 100 urine samples from specific events in the 2004 Games and found that four medal winners in Track and Field (both men and women, all in the throwing events) tested positive for performance-enhancing drugs.

On December 5, 2012, the IOC announced that men's shot put winner Bilonog, and women's shot put third-place finisher, Svetlana Krivelyova of Russia, re-tests showed positive for the steroid agent, Oxandrolone. Bilonog was stripped of his gold medal. The IOC, following established rules, allowed Bilonog (and the others disqualified) 21 days to appeal the ruling. Although no appeal was filed, the IOC waited another five months, to May 30, 2013, before declaring Adam Nelson the 2004 Olympic champion and awarding him the gold medal.

Nelson received his gold medal from a United States Olympic Committee official at an airport food court in Atlanta.

In 2017, Adam Nelson joined Michael Phelps in speaking before a U.S. Congressional committee examining anti-doping measures in international sporting events.

== Spin technique ==
Nelson throws with his right arm, utilizing the "spin" technique to generate speed and power within the 7-foot-diameter (2.135-meter) throwing ring. While the "spin" is considered a more powerful style (because of its rotational speed), competitors have a greater tendency to foul compared to those who use the more traditional "glide" technique. Although throws are usually launched within the legal sector, spinners are more prone to lose their balance in their follow-through and to step on the front toe board (or, to have a foot come down to the side, on or over the ring's 7-foot circle line.) For example, at the 2004 Olympic Games, Nelson foot-fouled on five of his six rounds of throws, though he did still win the gold medal.

== Advertising ==
During the early 2005 shot put season, Nelson solicited sponsors by wearing T-shirts reading "Space for Rent." This culminated in May when Nelson found a sponsor in the amount of $12,000, slightly more than the donation Nelson had made to the World Anti-Doping Agency following his second Olympic silver medal, and prior to that Olympics' winner later being disqualified for positive drug test. Nelson went on to win the IAAF World Championships later that season (though he wore the USA uniform in that competition).

== Post-shot put career ==
Since retiring from formal athletic competition, Nelson has trained top-level athletes in football, golf, baseball, and track and field. He has worked for NBC Sports as an expert on field events. Nelson remains a strong advocate of clean sport competition and often speaks out against the use of performance-enhancing drugs in athletic competition.

In 2017, Nelson moved to Houston with his wife and two kids, where he works for The D10, an events organization, that like the Olympic movement, has found ways to leverage physical performance to create a massive social impact, raising over $12 million for pediatric cancer research and treatment.

In 2020, he returned to his alma mater to become the athletic director of The Lovett School. z

In 2025, he announced his position on the USOPC, the United States Olympic Comity.

In 2025, he announced he accepted a job at Hoffman & Hoffman in Georgia.

== Major competition record ==
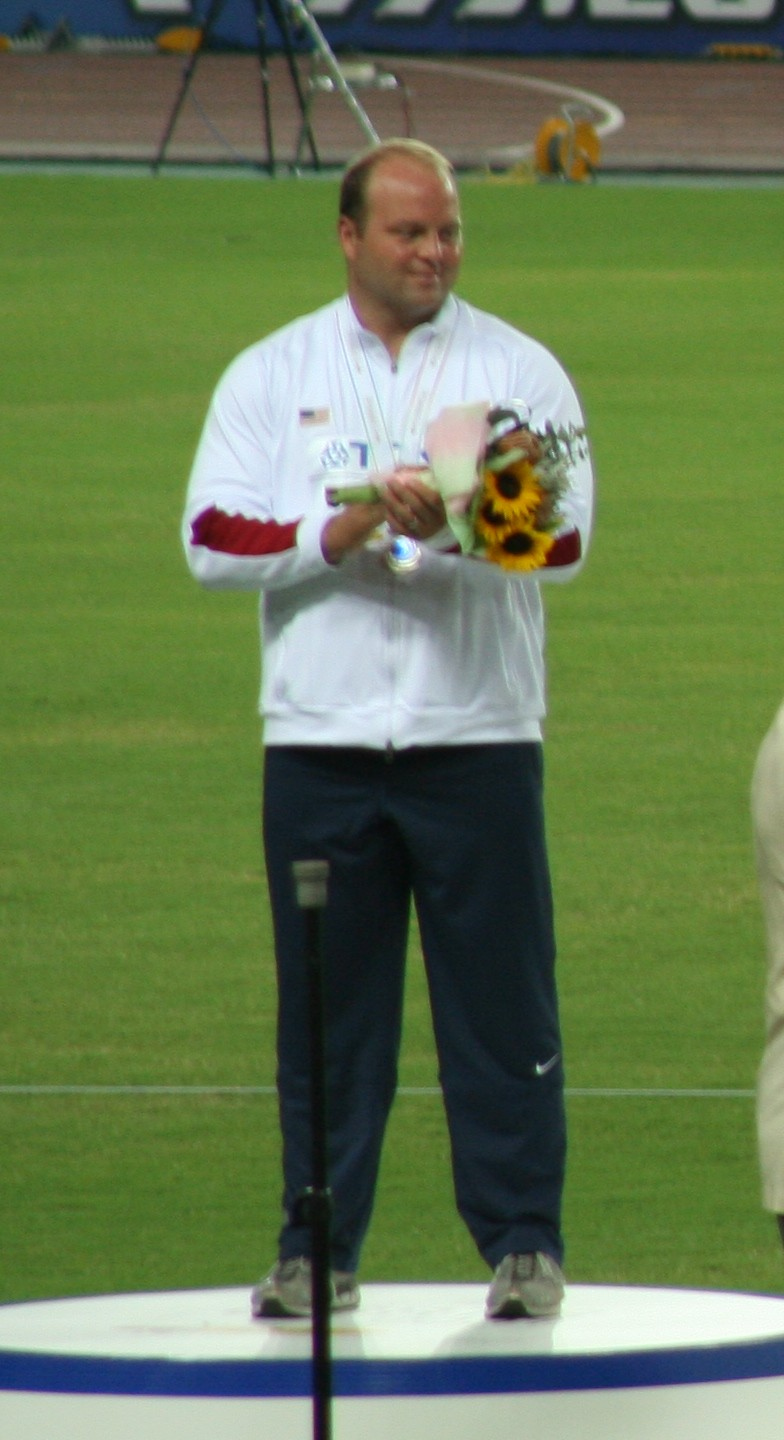
Nelson following his second-place finish at the 2007 World Championships

Year	Competition	Venue	Position	Notes
Representing the United States
1994	World Junior Championships	Lisbon, Portugal	1st	18.34 m
1999	Universiade	Palma de Mallorca, Spain	2nd	20.64 m
2000	Olympic Games	Sydney, Australia	2nd	21.21 m
2001	World Indoor Championships	Lisbon, Portugal	2nd	20.72 m
2001	World Championships	Edmonton, Canada	2nd	21.24 m
2001	Goodwill Games	Brisbane, Australia	1st	20.91 m
2003	World Championships	Paris, France	2nd	21.26 m
2004	Olympic Games	Athens, Greece	1st	21.16 m
2005	World Championships	Helsinki, Finland	1st	21.73 m
2007	World Championships	Osaka, Japan	2nd	21.61 m
2008	Olympic Games	Beijing, China	—N/a	NM
2009	World Championships	Berlin, Germany	5th	21.11 m
2011	World Championships	Daegu, South Korea	7th	20.29 m
