= Andrei Mikhnevich =

Belarusian shot putter

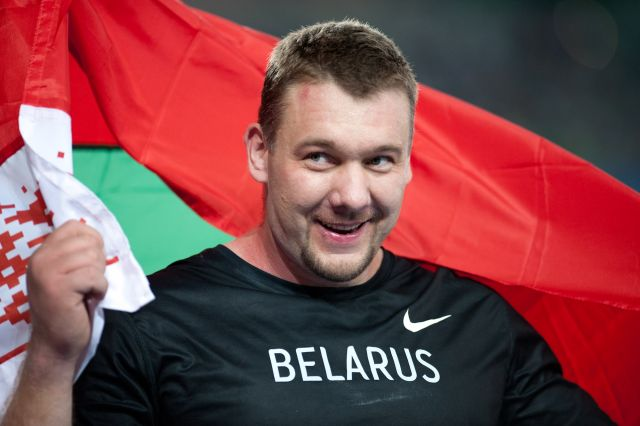
- Mikhnevich at the 2011 World Championships Athletics in Daegu

Personal information
- Born: 12 July 1976 (age 50) Babruysk, Byelorussian SSR, Soviet Union
- Height: 2.01 m (6 ft 7 in)
- Weight: 145 kg (320 lb)

Sport
- Country: Belarus
- Sport: Athletics
- Event: Shot put
Medal record
Olympic Games
Bronze medal – third place	2008 Beijing	Shot put
World Championships
Gold medal – first place	2003 Paris	Shot put
Bronze medal – third place	2007 Osaka	Shot put
Bronze medal – third place	2011 Daegu	Shot put
World Indoor Championships
Silver medal – second place	2006 Moscow	Shot put
Silver medal – second place	2010 Doha	Shot put
European Championships
Gold medal – first place	2010 Barcelona	Shot put
Silver medal – second place	2006 Gothenburg	Shot put
Continental Cup
Bronze medal – third place	2010 Split	Shot put
Summer Universiade
Gold medal – first place	2003 Daegu	Shot put
- Updated on 10 July 2015

Andrei Anatolyevich Mikhnevich (Belarusian: Андрэй Анатолевіч Міхневіч, Andrej Michnievič, Russian: Андрей Анатольевич Михневич; born 12 July 1976) is a Belarusian shot putter with a personal best of 21.69 metres, set in 2003.

== Career ==
He made his first major championships appearance at the 1999 IAAF World Indoor Championships and he finished eighth overall. He also attended the 1999 World Championships in Athletics that year but did not reach the final. His first Olympics soon followed at the 2000 Sydney Games where he finished ninth in the shot put final.

He became world champion in Paris with a personal best throw of 21.69 metres. He also won the Universiade the same year. His best performance in the following two years was a fifth place at the 2004 Summer Olympics.

In 2006 he finished second both at the World Indoor Championships in Moscow, with a new personal indoor best throw of 21.37 metres, and the 2006 European Championships with 21.11. He followed this with a bronze medal at the 2007 World Championships.

He finished fifth at the 2008 IAAF World Indoor Championships but rebounded to peak with a 22.00 m personal best in July and taking his first Olympic medal at the 2008 Beijing Olympics in the form of a bronze. He sank back down the rankings at the 2009 World Championships, finishing seventh, but he gained his second indoor silver at the 2010 World Indoors a few months later. He set a national indoor record of 21.81 m in Mogilev, Belarus, and continued his good form with a win at the 2010 European Cup Winter Throwing meeting. He followed that victory by winning the 2010 European Championships in Barcelona. His wife is fellow shot-putter Natallia Mikhnevich, who won a silver medal at the 2008 Olympic Games.

== Personal bests ==
Event	Best (m)	Venue	Date
Shot put (outdoor)	22.10	Saint-Denis, France	15 August 2011
Shot put (indoor)	21.81	Minsk, Belarus	6 February 2010

- All information taken from IAAF profile.

== Achievements ==
Year	Competition	Venue	Position	Notes
Representing Belarus
1997	European U23 Championships	Turku, Finland	6th	18.72 m
1999	World Indoor Championships	Maebashi, Japan	8th	19.44 m
2000	Olympic Games	Sydney, Australia	9th	19.48 m
2001	World Championships	Edmonton, Canada	(10th)	(20.42 m)
2003	World Championships	Paris, France	1st	21.69 m = PB
2003	Universiade	Daegu, South Korea	1st	20.76 m
2003	World Athletics Final	Monte Carlo, Monaco	3rd	20.51 m
2004	World Indoor Championships	Budapest, Hungary	6th	20.50 m
2004	Olympic Games	Athens, Greece	5th	20.60 m
2004	World Athletics Final	Monte Carlo, Monaco	7th	19.47 m
2005	World Championships	Helsinki, Finland	6th	
2005	World Athletics Final	Monte Carlo, Monaco	7th	
2006	World Indoor Championships	Moscow, Russia	2nd	(21.37
2006	European Championships	Gothenburg, Sweden	2nd	(21.11 m)
2007	European Indoor Championships	Birmingham, United Kingdom	25th	
2007	World Championships	Osaka, Japan	3rd	
2007	World Athletics Final	Stuttgart, Germany	3rd	
2008	World Indoor Championships	Valencia, Spain	4th	
2008	Olympic Games	Beijing, China	3rd	
2010	World Indoor Championships	Doha, Qatar	2nd	
2010	European Cup Winter Throwing	Arles, France	1st	21.04 m
2010	European Championships	Barcelona, Spain	1st	21.01 m
2011	World Championships	Daegu, South Korea	3rd	21.40 m
