= Karel Potgieter =

South African shot putter

Personal information
- Born: 21 September 1975 (age 51) Pretoria, South Africa
- Relative: Frits Potgieter (brother)

Sport
- Country: South Africa
- Sport: Shot put

Achievements and titles
- Olympic finals: 2000 Summer Olympics
Medal record
Representing South Africa
African Games
Bronze medal – third place	1999 Johannesburg	Shot put

Herman Karel Potgieter (born 21 September 1975) is a South African former shot put athlete who competed in the 2000 Summer Olympics, where he scored a 19.02 in the first heat, not enough to advance to the next round. His personal best is 20.29. He is the brother of fellow Olympian Frits Potgieter.
