= Ville Tiisanoja =

Finnish shot putter

Ville Johannes Tiisanoja (born 24 December 1975 in Vantaa, Finland) is a 192 cm (6 ft 4 in) tall Finnish shot putter who weighs 119 kg (262 lb) and competes for Kenttäurheilijat-58 in Vantaa. His personal best in the men's shot put currently stands at 21.09 m, which he put on 28 July 2002 in the Elite Games in Kuortane, Finland. He is coached by his father Kalle Tiisanoja. Tiisanoja is a construction foreman by trade.

Although Tiisanoja does not hold any Finnish records for men's shot put, he does hold the record for 17-year-olds from 1992 (19.79 m) and the indoor shot put record for 14-year-olds from 1989 (13.30 m). In addition, Tiisanoja holds several records for discus, javelin throw and hammer throw. Tiisanoja competed in the 2004 Olympic Games in Athens, where he did not make it to the final round and ended up placing 19th thanks to his put of 19.50 in the qualifiers.

Even though Tiisanoja regularly puts over 20 m, his best placing in the European Championships was a 4th place in the 2005 Indoor Championships in Madrid and 8th place in 3 World Athletics Championships. He has, however, won 3 Finnish Championships, one (2006) which he has been stripped of. Tiisanoja was the 15th member to be inducted into the 20 meter club after he successfully putted the shot 20.06 m in a competition on 31 July 1999 in Espoo, Finland.

== Doping ==
=== 2002 ===
Tiisanoja and discus thrower Timo Tompuri were caught by the French Customs Authorities in spring 2002 with doping substances (4 ampules of testosterone, 38 tablets of ephedrine, 44 tablets of clenbuterol and 245 tablets of melatonin) in their car when they were returning from training in Spain; they denied all involvement and were left off with a warning even though the Legal Protection Board of Sport in Finland stated in their decision that it was extremely unlikely that someone would have been able to stash doping substances in their luggage by accident or without their knowledge that are abused in their sports events. For this reason, the Legal Protection Board did not consider it credible that Tiisanoja and Tompuri did not know about the doping substances in their car.

=== 2006 ===
On 27 June, 21 July and 31 July 2006 Tiisanoja tested positive for testosterone; he admitted that his A test was accurate and did not request that his B sample be analyzed. Tiisanoja is banned from competing for two years and has been fined EUR 50,000. In addition, all of his results in competitions since 27 June 2006 will be thrown out, thus stripping him of his gold medal in the Finnish Championships that year, meaning that Conny Karlsson won that year's Finnish Championship. Tiisanoja is attributing his decision to use a banned substance to his desire to attain the levels he had previously reached in international competitions after a dismal indoors season.

== Achievements ==
Year	Competition	Venue	Position	Event	Notes
Representing Finland
1994	World Junior Championships	Lisbon, Portugal	3rd	Shot put	17.90 m
1994	World Junior Championships	Lisbon, Portugal	10th	Discus	50.86 m
1997	European U23 Championships	Turku, Finland	4th	Shot put	19.01 m
2001	World Championships	Edmonton, Canada	9th	Shot put	20.45 m
2002	European Championships	Munich, Germany	6th	Shot put	20.20 m
2006	European Championships	Gothenburg, Sweden	DSQ	Shot put	19.48 m

== See also ==
- List of sportspeople sanctioned for doping offences
