= Mikuláš Konopka =

Slovak shot putter

Personal information
- Born: 23 January 1979 (age 47) Rimavská Sobota, Czechoslovakia

Sport
- Sport: Track and field
Medal record
Representing Slovakia
European Indoor Championships
Gold medal – first place	2007 Birmingham	Shot put
European U23 Championships
Gold medal – first place	1999 Gothenburg	Shot put
Gold medal – first place	2001 Amsterdam	Shot put
World Junior Championships
Gold medal – first place	1998 Annecy	Shot put

Mikuláš Konopka (born 23 January 1979) is a Slovak retired shot putter.

Konopka originally won the bronze medal at the 2002 European Indoor Championships with a personal best throw (indoor) of 20.87 metres, but tested positive for stanozolol and lost the medal. He was suspended between March 2002 and March 2004.

His personal best throw outdoor is 20.66 metres, achieved in May 2001 in Ostrava. He currently holds the Slovak indoor record with 21.57, achieved when he won the 2007 European Indoor Championships.

On 13 May 2008 Konopka tested positive for metandienone and subsequently received a lifetime ban from competing due to a second doping violation.

== Achievements ==
Year	Competition	Venue	Position	Notes
Representing Slovakia
1996	World Junior Championships	Sydney, Australia	5th	17.33 m
1998	World Junior Championships	Annecy, France	1st	18.50 m
1999	European U23 Championships	Gothenburg, Sweden	1st	19.60 m
2001	European U23 Championships	Amsterdam, Netherlands	1st	19.79 m
2001	World Championships	Edmonton, Canada	21st	18.89 m
2001	Universiade	Beijing, China	5th	19.51 m
2004	Olympic Games	Athens, Greece	10th	19.92 m
2005	European Indoor Championships	Madrid, Spain	5th	19.95 m
2005	World Championships	Helsinki, Finland	9th	19.72 m
2005	World Athletics Final	Monte Carlo, Monaco	6th	19.29 m
2006	European Championships	Gothenburg, Sweden	12th	19.65 m
2007	European Indoor Championships	Birmingham, United Kingdom	1st	21.57 NRi

== See also ==
- List of sportspeople sanctioned for doping offences
