= Szilárd Kiss =

Hungarian shot putter

Personal information
- Nationality: Hungarian
- Born: 9 December 1975 (age 50) Zalaegerszeg, Hungary

Sport
- Sport: Athletics
- Event: Shot put

Szilárd Kiss (born 9 December 1975) is a Hungarian athlete. He competed in the men's shot put at the 2000 Summer Olympics.
