= Ivan Emilianov =

Moldovan shot putter

Personal information
- Born: February 19, 1977 (age 49) Chișinău, Moldovan SSR, Soviet Union
- Height: 2.02 m (6 ft 7 1/2 in)
- Weight: 165 kg (364 lb)

Sport
- Country: Moldova
- Sport: Athletics
- Event: Shot put

Ivan Emilianov (born 19 February 1977) is a Moldovan shot putter.

He competed at the Olympic Games in 2000, 2004 and 2008, the World Championships in 2001 and 2007, the World Indoor Championships in 2004 and 2008 and the European Championships in 2002 and 2006 without reaching the finals.

He achieved his best throw of 20.64 metres on May 29, 2011, at the Moldovan Championships in Chişinău, Moldova. He has 20.26 metres on the indoor track, which he achieved in February 2000 in Chişinău. He improved his own Moldovan national record in the shot put at an indoor meet in Moldova in February, launching the implement at 20.31 m.

== Doping case ==
On 18 June 2011, he was banned from competition for 2 years for the use of banned anabolic steroids, metenolone and stanozolol.
