= 2007 World Championships in Athletics – Men's shot put =

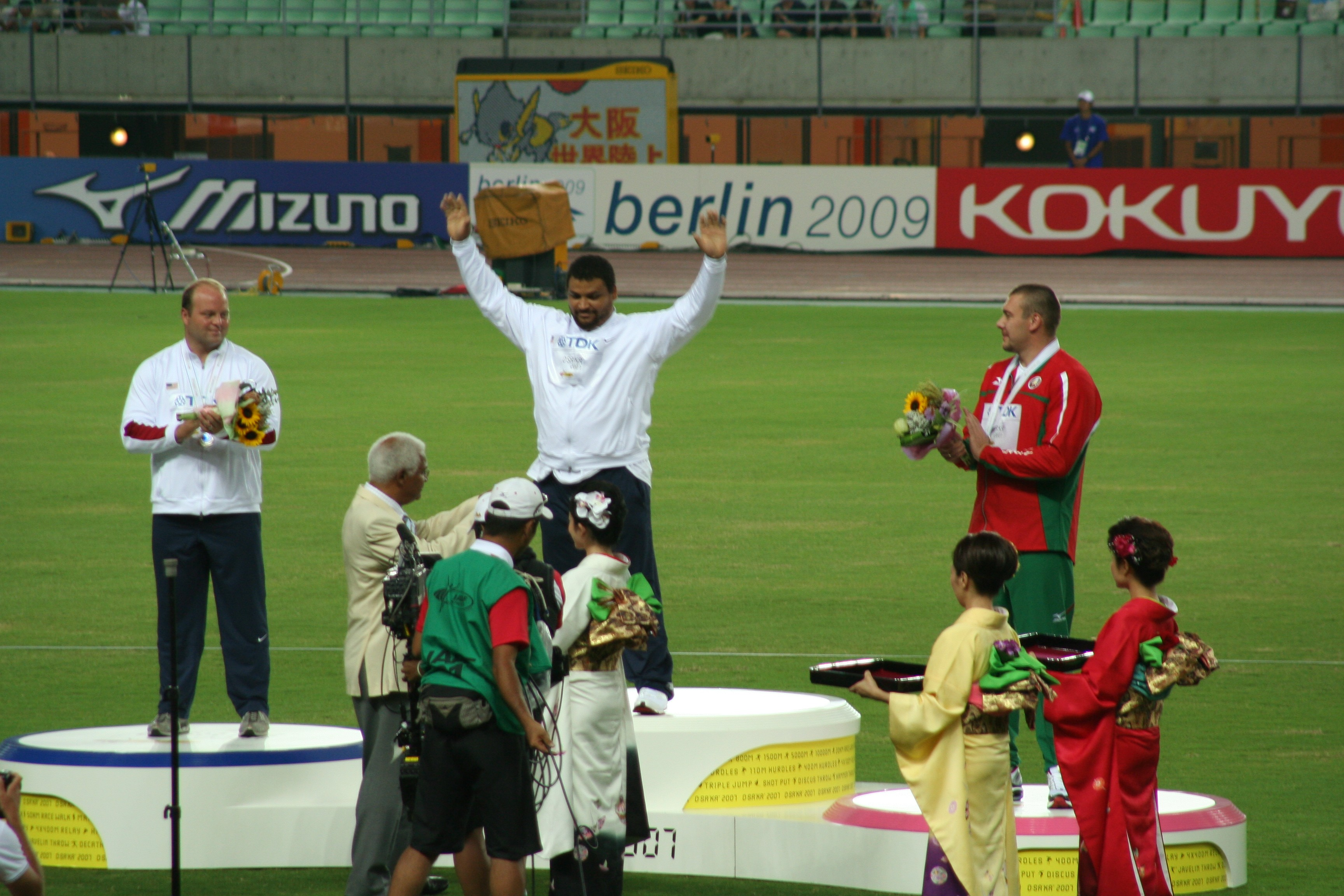
Victory ceremony (including the later disqualified Mikhnevich)

The men's shot put event at the 2007 World Championships in Athletics took place on August 25, 2007 at the Nagai Stadium in Osaka, Japan.

In 2013 it was revealed that Andrei Mikhnevich, the original bronze medalist, tested positive for a prohibited substance at the 2005 World Championships. Since this was his second offense, he was given a lifetime ban and all his results from August 2005 on were annulled.

== Medallists ==
Gold	Reese Hoffa; United States (USA)
Silver	Adam Nelson; United States (USA)
Bronze	Rutger Smith; Netherlands (NED)

== Abbreviations ==
- All results shown are in metres

Q	automatic qualification
q	qualification by rank
DNS	did not start
NM	no mark
WR	world record
AR	area record
NR	national record
PB	personal best
SB	season best

== Records ==
World Record	Randy Barnes (USA)	23.12 m	May 20, 1990	Westwood, United States
Championship record	Werner Günthör (SUI)	22.23 m	August 29, 1987	Rome, Italy

== Results ==
=== Qualification ===
==== Group A ====
Place	Athlete	Nation	1	2	3	Time	Notes
1	Adam Nelson	United States	X	20.81		20.81	Q
2	Joachim Olsen	Denmark	20.62			20.62	Q
3	Yury Bialou	Belarus	X	20.26		20.26	Q
4	Tomasz Majewski	Poland	X	20.25		20.25	Q
5	Dorian Scott	Jamaica	19.90	20.01	19.87	20.01	q
6	Anton Lyuboslavskiy	Russia	X	19.74	19.91	19.91	
7	Yves Niaré	France	19.24	19.62	19.53	19.62	
8	Milan Haborák	Slovakia	19.50	19.55	X	19.55	
9	Mika Vasara	Finland	19.40	18.91	19.55	19.55	
10	Pavel Lyzhyn	Belarus	X	X	19.45	19.45	
11	Navpreet Singh	India	19.00	19.34	19.35	19.35	
12	Sultan Abdulmajeed Al-Habashi	Saudi Arabia	X	X	19.20	19.20	
13	Germán Lauro	Argentina	19.19	X	18.67	19.19	
14	Marco Antonio Verni	Chile	X	X	18.68	18.68	
15	Noah Bryant	United States	X	18.58	X	18.58	
16	Antonin Žalský	Czech Republic	18.41	18.50	X	18.50	
17	Ivan Emilianov	Moldova	18.15	17.70	18.47	18.47	
—	Peter Sack	Germany	X	X	X	NM	
—	Hamza Alic	Bosnia and Herzegovina	X	X	X	NM	
—	Dragan Peric	Serbia	DNS				

==== Group B ====
Place	Athlete	Nation	1	2	3	Time	Notes
1	Rutger Smith	Netherlands	21.04			21.04	Q
2	Reese Hoffa	United States	20.89			20.89	Q
3	Ralf Bartels	Germany	19.91	20.33		20.33	Q
4	Dylan Armstrong	Canada	18.62	20.07	19.65	20.07	q
5	Miran Vodovnik	Slovenia	19.51	19.97	19.11	19.97	q
6	Pavel Sofin	Russia	19.43	19.92	19.68	19.92	q
7	Scott Martin	Australia	19.71	19.81	X	19.81	
8	Mikuláš Konopka	Slovakia	18.78	X	19.63	19.63	
9	Petr Stehlík	Czech Republic	19.25	X	19.51	19.51	
10	Robert Häggblom	Finland	X	19.29	X	19.29	
11	Māris Urtāns	Latvia	X	X	19.17	19.17	
12	Khalid Habash Al-Suwaidi	Qatar	19.09	18.80	18.75	19.09	
13	Nedzad Mulabegovic	Croatia	18.69	X	X	18.69	
14	Milan Jotanović	Serbia	18.57	X	X	18.57	
15	Chang Ming Huang	Chinese Taipei	18.53	18.08	18.48	18.53	
16	Daniel Taylor	United States	X	X	18.45	18.45	
17	Satoshi Hatase	Japan	17.30	17.71	17.42	17.71	
18	Lajos Kürthy	Hungary	17.56	17.43	X	17.56	
—	Manuel Martínez Gutiérrez	Spain	X	X	X	NM	
—	Andrei Mikhnevich	Belarus	~~20.23~~			~~20.23~~	Q, DQ

=== Final ===
Place	Athlete	Nation	1	2	3	4	5	6	Mark	Notes
1st place, gold medalist(s)	Reese Hoffa	United States	21.81	21.64	22.04	X	21.92	21.58	22.04	
2nd place, silver medalist(s)	Adam Nelson	United States	21.47	21.61	X	X	X	X	21.61	SB
3rd place, bronze medalist(s)	Rutger Smith	Netherlands	20.90	21.13	20.90	X	X	X	21.13	
4	Tomasz Majewski	Poland	20.35	X	20.37	20.41	20.07	20.87	20.87	PB
5	Miran Vodovnik	Slovenia	19.85	20.42	X	20.67	20.25	X	20.67	SB
6	Ralf Bartels	Germany	20.02	20.34	X	20.40	20.45	20.09	20.45	Q
7	Yury Bialou	Belarus	20.34	X	X	X	X	20.34	20.34	
8	Dylan Armstrong	Canada	20.22	20.23	19.94				20.23	
9	Pavel Sofin	Russia	19.62	X	X				19.62	
—	Dorian Scott	Jamaica	X	X	X				NM	
—	Joachim Olsen	Denmark	X	X	X				NM	
—	Andrei Mikhnevich	Belarus	~~19.97~~	~~21.27~~	~~20.88~~	~~20.75~~	~~20.61~~	X	~~21.27~~	DQ
