= 2007 European Athletics Indoor Championships – Men's shot put =

The Men's shot put event at the 2007 European Athletics Indoor Championships was held on March 2.

== Medalists ==
Gold	Silver	Bronze
Mikuláš Konopka; Slovakia	Pavel Lyzhyn; Belarus	Joachim Olsen; Denmark

== Results ==
=== Qualification ===
Qualifying perf. 20.00 (Q) or 8 best performers (q) advanced to the Final.

Rank	Athlete	Nationality	#1	#2	#3	Result	Note
1	Joachim Olsen	Denmark	20.93			20.93	Q
2	Mikuláš Konopka	Slovakia	20.35			20.35	Q
3	Pavel Lyzhyn	Belarus	19.97	19.82	X	19.97	q
4	Miran Vodovnik	Slovenia	18.53	19.56	19.88	19.88	q
5	Robert Häggblom	Finland	19.83	19.74	X	19.83	q
6	Gaëtan Bucki	France	18.94	19.61	X	19.61	q
7	Conny Karlsson	Finland	19.58	X	19.57	19.58	q
8	Rutger Smith	Netherlands	19.19	X	X	19.19	
9	Jakub Giża	Poland	18.67	18.36	19.15	19.15	
10	Anton Lyuboslavskiy	Russia	18.84	X	19.12	19.12	
11	Soslan Tsirikhov	Russia	X	X	19.00	19.00	
12	Milan Haborák	Slovakia	18.71	18.84	18.50	18.84	
13	Manuel Martínez	Spain	X	18.73	18.30	18.73	
14	José María Peña	Spain	18.61	18.44	X	18.61	
15	Māris Urtāns	Latvia	18.59	X	X	18.59	
16	Andriy Semenov	Ukraine	X	18.41	18.23	18.41	
17	Taavi Peetre	Estonia	18.28	X	X	18.28	
18	Óddin Björn Thorsteinsson	Iceland	17.45	17.94	17.35	17.94	
19	Kim Christensen	Denmark	16.70	X	17.36	17.36	
	~~Andrei Mikhnevich~~	~~Belarus~~	~~19.75~~	~~19.64~~	~~X~~	~~19.75~~	DQ

=== Final ===
Rank	Athlete	Nationality	#1	#2	#3	#4	#5	#6	Result	Note
1st place, gold medalist(s)	Mikuláš Konopka	Slovakia	21.32	21.57	X	21.36	21.14	21.40	21.57	NR
2nd place, silver medalist(s)	Pavel Lyzhyn	Belarus	20.08	20.48	X	20.82	X	X	20.82	PB
3rd place, bronze medalist(s)	Joachim Olsen	Denmark	X	X	20.43	20.55	X	X	20.55	
4	Robert Häggblom	Finland	20.00	X	20.05	20.04	X	20.26	20.26	PB
5	Conny Karlsson	Finland	19.45	19.77	19.68	19.85	19.89	20.09	20.09	SB
6	Miran Vodovnik	Slovenia	X	X	18.62	18.58	19.15	19.46	19.46	
7	Gaëtan Bucki	France	18.72	X	X	X	X	X	18.72	
	~~Andrei Mikhnevich~~	~~Belarus~~	~~X~~	~~19.55~~	~~20.12~~	~~X~~	~~X~~	~~X~~	~~20.12~~	DQ
