= 2005 European Athletics Indoor Championships – Men's shot put =

The Men's shot put event at the 2005 European Athletics Indoor Championships was held on March 4–5.

== Medalists ==
Gold	Silver	Bronze
Joachim Olsen; Denmark	Rutger Smith; Netherlands	Manuel Martínez; Spain

== Results ==
=== Qualification ===
Qualifying perf. 20.10 (Q) or 8 best performers (q) advanced to the Final.

Rank	Athlete	Nationality	#1	#2	#3	Result	Note
1	Joachim Olsen	Denmark	19.92	20.67		20.67	Q
2	Rutger Smith	Netherlands	19.45	X	20.46	20.46	Q, SB
3	Mikulas Konopka	Slovakia	20.46			20.46	Q
4	Manuel Martínez	Spain	20.30			20.30	Q
5	Ivan Yushkov	Russia	19.04	19.43	20.06	20.06	q, SB
6	Ville Tiisanoja	Finland	20.03	19.77	20.04	20.04	q
7	Pavel Sofin	Russia	19.85	X	X	19.85	q, PB
8	Gheorghe Guset	Romania	X	19.64	19.80	19.80	q
9	Andy Dittmar	Germany	19.72	19.41	19.43	19.72	
10	Tomasz Majewski	Poland	19.09	19.57	X	19.57	
11	Mika Vasara	Finland	19.56	X	X	19.56	
12	Peter Sack	Germany	19.11	X	19.47	19.47	
13	Taavi Peetre	Estonia	19.08	19.24	19.45	19.45	
14	Petr Stehlík	Czech Republic	19.36	X	X	19.36	
15	Conny Karlsson	Finland	X	19.32	X	19.32	
16	Miran Vodovnik	Slovenia	19.01	X	X	19.01	
17	Marco Dodoni	Italy	18.87	18.81	18.91	18.91	
18	Gaëtan Bucki	France	X	X	18.86	18.86	
19	Detlef Bock	Germany	X	18.77	X	18.77	
20	Ivan Emelianov	Moldova	17.79	17.85	X	17.85	
	Jimmy Nordin	Sweden	X	X	X	NM	

=== Final ===
Rank	Athlete	Nationality	#1	#2	#3	#4	#5	#6	Result	Note
1st place, gold medalist(s)	Joachim Olsen	Denmark	21.19	20.76	20.52	20.81	X	X	21.19	
2nd place, silver medalist(s)	Rutger Smith	Netherlands	20.05	20.51	20.50	20.79	20.78	X	20.79	NR
3rd place, bronze medalist(s)	Manuel Martínez	Spain	20.23	X	X	20.51	X	20.51	20.51	=SB
4	Ville Tiisanoja	Finland	20.01	19.97	X	20.10	20.36	20.00	20.36	SB
5	Gheorghe Guset	Romania	19.79	20.25	X	X	19.85	X	20.25	
6	Mikulas Konopka	Slovakia	X	19.69	19.95	X	X	X	19.95	
7	Ivan Yushkov	Russia	19.23	X	X	19.49	19.69	X	19.69	
8	Pavel Sofin	Russia	19.15	19.42	X	19.51	X	X	19.51	
