= 2008 IAAF World Indoor Championships – Men's shot put =

== Medalists ==
Gold
Christian Cantwell	United States
Silver
Reese Hoffa	United States
Bronze
Tomasz Majewski	Poland

== Qualification ==
Chang Ming-Huang competing in qualification

Qualification rule: qualification standard 20.20m or at least best 8 qualified

Pos	Athlete	Country	Mark	Q	Attempts		
Pos	Athlete	Country	Mark	Q	1	2	3
1	Reese Hoffa	United States	21.49 SB	Q	21.49		
2	Christian Cantwell	United States	20.91	Q	19.25	20.91	
3	Scott Martin	Australia	20.83 AR	Q	20.12	19.85	20.83
4	Dorian Scott	Jamaica	20.62 NR	Q	19.56	20.62	
5	Rutger Smith	Netherlands	20.30	Q	19.96	19.60	20.30
6	Peter Sack	Germany	20.27	Q	20.27		
7	Tomasz Majewski	Poland	20.23	Q	19.89	20.23	
8	Hamza Alić	Bosnia and Herzegovina	20.00		19.36	20.00	19.96
9	Pavel Sofin	Russia	19.95		19.71	19.95	19.95
10	Miran Vodovnik	Slovenia	19.80		19.26	18.94	19.94
11	Carl Myerscough	United Kingdom	19.86 SB		X	X	19.86
12	Milan Haborák	Slovakia	19.80		19.80	X	X
13	Manuel Martínez	Spain	19.75 SB		19.56	19.64	19.75
14	Dylan Armstrong	Canada	19.56		19.56	X	19.03
15	Robert Häggblom	Finland	19.42		19.56	X	19.42
16	Yuriy Bilonoh	Ukraine	19.02		19.02	X	-
17	Kim Christensen	Denmark	18.26		17.95	17.87	18.26
18	Ivan Emilianov	Moldova	18.16		18.16	18.70	X
19	Marco Fortes	Portugal	17.96		X	17.96	X
20	Chang Ming-Huang	Chinese Taipei	17.73		17.73	X	X
	~~Andrei Mikhnevich~~	~~Belarus~~	~~20.58~~	~~Q~~	~~20.58~~		

== Final ==
Pos	Athlete	Country	Mark	Attempts					
Pos	Athlete	Country	Mark	1	2	3	4	5	6
Gold medal	Christian Cantwell	United States	21.77	21.14	21.19	21.59	X	21.77	21.69
Silver medal	Reese Hoffa	United States	21.20	20.31	21.20	20.74	X	X	X
Bronze medal	Tomasz Majewski	Poland	20.93 NR	X	20.78	20.93	X	X	X
4	Rutger Smith	Netherlands	20.78	20.75	20.78	X	X	X	X
5	Dorian Scott	Jamaica	20.29	20.03	20.12	20.05	X	20.29	X
6	Scott Martin	Australia	20.13	18.96	20.13	X	X	X	19.54
7	Peter Sack	Germany	20.05	19.95	19.94	19.67	19.96	20.05	X
	~~Andrei Mikhnevich~~	~~Belarus~~	~~20.82 SB~~	~~20.58~~	~~20.66~~	~~X~~	~~20.39~~	~~20.60~~	~~20.82~~
