= Yuri Belov =

Yuri Belov may refer to:

- Yuri Belov (painter) (1929–2017, Russian Soviet realist painter
- Yuri Belov (actor) (1930–1991), Soviet film and theatre actor
- Yury Bialou, Belarusian shot putter
