= 2006 European Athletics Championships – Men's shot put =

Men's shot put at the European Athletics Championships

The men's shot put at the 2006 European Athletics Championships were held at the Ullevi on August 7.

Ralf Bartels was outside the podium before the final attempt, having managed 20.57 in his first five, whereas Andrei Mikhnevich and Joachim Olsen had achieved their best attempts in round two. However, Bartels put the shot two centimetres further than Mikhnevich, and despite Olsen coming up with a second 21-metre put with 21.04 in his final attempt, it was not enough to better his previous attempts.

In 2013 it was revealed that Mikhnevich tested positive for prohibited substances at the 2005 World Championships. Since this was his second offense, he was given a lifetime ban and all his results from August 2005 on were annulled. In addition, the results of finalists Ville Tiisanoja and Yuriy Bilonoh were also voided for doping offences as indicated in the official results at the European Athletics website.

== Medalists ==
Gold	Silver	Bronze
Ralf Bartels; Germany	Joachim Olsen; Denmark	Rutger Smith; Netherlands

== Schedule ==
Date	Time	Round
August 7, 2006	10:05	Qualification
August 7, 2006	18:45	Final

== Results ==
=== Qualification ===
Qualification: Qualifying Performance 20.20 (Q) or at least 12 best performers (q) advance to the final.

Rank	Group	Athlete	Nationality	#1	#2	#3	Result	Notes
1	B	Ralf Bartels	Germany	20.58			20.58	Q
2	B	Rutger Smith	Netherlands	20.39			20.39	Q
3	B	Manuel Martínez	Spain	19.60	19.84	20.37	20.37	Q
4	A	Joachim Olsen	Denmark	19.79	20.32		20.32	Q
5	B	Anton Lyuboslavskiy	Russia	18.89	19.09	20.22	20.22	Q
6	A	Pavel Sofin	Russia	x	19.77	20.15	20.15	q
7	B	Tomasz Majewski	Poland	18.80	19.74	19.61	19.74	q
8	B	Pavel Lyzhyn	Belarus	x	19.37	19.71	19.71	q
9	A	Andy Dittmar	Germany	19.43	19.29	19.68	19.68	q
10	B	Mikuláš Konopka	Slovakia	19.65	19.40	x	19.65	
11	A	Milan Jotanović	Serbia	18.68	18.53	19.53	19.53	
12	A	Carl Myerscough	Great Britain	19.52	x	19.02	19.52	
13	B	Nedžad Mulabegović	Croatia	17.59	18.88	19.48	19.48	
14	A	Milan Haborák	Slovakia	19.09	18.98	19.38	19.38	
15	A	Conny Karlsson	Finland	18.92	x	19.18	19.18	
16	A	Raigo Toompuu	Estonia	18.95	19.11	x	19.11	SB
17	A	Gheorghe Guşet	Romania	x	x	19.00	19.00	
18	B	Mika Vasara	Finland	x	18.95	x	18.95	
19	A	Gaëtan Bucki	France	18.85	18.94	x	18.94	
20	B	Yves Niaré	France	18.70	x	x	18.70	
21	B	Taavi Peetre	Estonia	18.67	x	18.53	18.67	
22	A	Galin Kostadinov	Bulgaria	18.04	18.43	18.27	18.43	
23	B	Māris Urtāns	Latvia	18.40	17.84	x	18.40	
24	A	Jimmy Nordin	Sweden	18.26	18.28	18.35	18.35	
25	A	Hamza Alić	Bosnia and Herzegovina	x	18.15	x	18.15	
26	B	Remigius Machura	Czech Republic	17.90	17.92	18.09	18.09	
27	A	Ivan Emilianov	Moldova	18.04	17.78	17.65	18.04	
28	B	Danilo Ristić	Montenegro	15.29	x	x	15.29	
	B	Luka Rujević	Serbia	x	x	x	NM	
	A	~~Andrei Mikhnevich~~	~~Belarus~~	~~x~~	~~20.49~~		~~20.49~~	Q, DQ
	B	~~Ville Tiisanoja~~	~~Finland~~	~~20.34~~			~~20.34~~	Q, DQ
	A	~~Yuriy Bilonoh~~	~~Ukraine~~	~~19.78~~	~~x~~	~~x~~	~~19.78~~	q, DQ

=== Final ===
Rank	Athlete	Nationality	#1	#2	#3	#4	#5	#6	Result	Notes
1st place, gold medalist(s)	Ralf Bartels	Germany	20.08	20.45	20.57	20.47	20.23	21.13	21.13	SB
2nd place, silver medalist(s)	Joachim Olsen	Denmark	20.06	21.09	20.95	x	20.79	21.04	21.09	
3rd place, bronze medalist(s)	Rutger Smith	Netherlands	19.76	20.73	20.90	20.63	x	20.18	20.90	
4	Pavel Sofin	Russia	20.39	20.55	20.22	20.49	x	20.40	20.55	
5	Andy Dittmar	Germany	19.62	19.59	19.93	x	19.61	19.95	19.95	
6	Tomasz Majewski	Poland	19.52	19.85	x	x	x	-	19.85	
7	Manuel Martínez	Spain	x	19.68	19.18				19.68	
8	Pavel Lyzhyn	Belarus	x	19.51	19.49				19.51	
9	Anton Lyuboslavskiy	Russia	19.44	x	x				19.44	
	~~Andrei Mikhnevich~~	~~Belarus~~	~~20.88~~	~~21.11~~	~~20.57~~	~~21.05~~	~~x~~	~~20.68~~	~~21.11~~	DQ
	~~Yuriy Bilonoh~~	~~Ukraine~~	~~20.32~~	~~20.21~~	~~x~~	~~x~~	~~x~~	~~x~~	~~20.32~~	DQ
	~~Ville Tiisanoja~~	~~Finland~~	~~x~~	~~x~~	~~19.48~~				~~19.48~~	DQ
