= 2012 IAAF World Indoor Championships – Men's shot put =

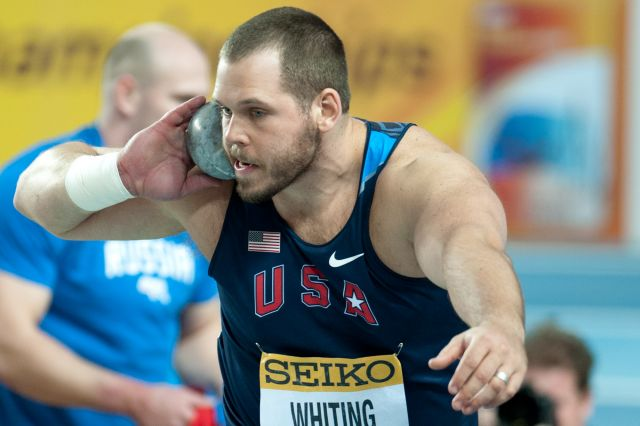
Gold medal winner Ryan Whiting during the competition.

The men's shot put at the 2012 IAAF World Indoor Championships took place March 9 at the Ataköy Athletics Arena.

== Medalists ==
Gold	Silver	Bronze
Ryan Whiting; United States	David Storl; Germany	Tomasz Majewski; Poland

== Records ==
Standing records prior to the 2012 IAAF World Indoor Championships
World record	Randy Barnes (USA)	22.66	Los Angeles, United States	20 January 1989
Championship record	Ulf Timmermann (GDR)	22.24	Indianapolis, United States	7 March 1987
World Leading	Reese Hoffa (USA)	21.87	Chemnitz, Germany	28 January 2012
African record	Janus Robberts (RSA)	21.47	Norman, United States	1 December 2001
Asian record	Zhang Jun (CHN)	20.16	Nanjing, China	13 February 2012
European record	Ulf Timmermann (GDR)	22.55	Senftenberg, East Germany	11 February 1989
North and Central American and Caribbean record	Randy Barnes (USA)	22.66	Los Angeles, United States	20 January 1989
Oceanian Record	Scott Martin (AUS)	20.83	Valencia, Spain	7 March 2008
South American record	Gert Weil (CHI)	20.15	Leverkusen, West Germany	31 January 1985

== Qualification standards ==
Indoor
20.00

== Schedule ==
Date	Time	Round
March 9, 2012	9:55	Qualification
March 9, 2012	19:15	Final

== Results ==
=== Qualification ===
Qualification standard: 20.70 m (Q) or at least best 8 qualified (q). 23 athletes from 20 countries participated. The qualification round started at 09:54 and ended at 11:04.

Rank	Athlete	Nationality	#1	#2	#3	Result	Notes
1	David Storl	Germany	21.43			21.43	SB, Q
2	Reese Hoffa	United States	21.23			21.23	Q
3	Tomasz Majewski	Poland	20.33	21.17		21.17	Q
4	Germán Lauro	Argentina	20.35	20.08	20.40	20.40	AR, q
5	Ryan Whiting	United States	x	20.37	20.27	20.37	q
6	Rutger Smith	Netherlands	19.36	20.19	20.21	20.21	q
7	Ivan Yushkov	Russia	20.14	19.49	19.99	20.14	q
8	Maksim Sidorov	Russia	19.45	19.24	20.04	20.04	q
9	Dylan Armstrong	Canada	19.84	x	x	19.84	
10	Marco Fortes	Portugal	19.83	19.21	19.20	19.83	
11	Dale Stevenson	Australia	19.72	x	19.80	19.80	
12	Asmir Kolašinac	Serbia	x	x	19.70	19.70	
13	Carlos Véliz	Cuba	19.60	19.64	x	19.64	
14	Lajos Kürthy	Hungary	x	x	19.62	19.62	
15	Candy Bauer	Germany	x	x	19.60	19.60	
16	Amin Nikfar	Iran	18.69	18.82	18.97	18.97	
17	Burger Lambrechts	South Africa	18.96	x	x	18.96	
18	Borja Vivas	Spain	18.94	x	18.52	18.94	
19	Kim Christensen	Denmark	x	x	18.87	18.87	
20	Hamza Alić	Bosnia and Herzegovina	18.49	18.80	x	18.80	
21	Chang Ming-Huang	Chinese Taipei	x	18.75	x	18.75	
22	Emanuele Fuamatu	Samoa	18.60	x	x	18.60	NR
23	Hüseyin Atıcı	Turkey	18.42	18.34	18.38	18.42	

=== Final ===
8 athletes from 6 countries participated. The final started at 19:54 and ended at 20:04.

Rank	Athlete	Nationality	#1	#2	#3	#4	#5	#6	Result	Notes
1st place, gold medalist(s)	Ryan Whiting	United States	21.59	x	21.06	21.16	22.00	21.98	22.00	WL
2nd place, silver medalist(s)	David Storl	Germany	21.88	x	21.86	x	x	x	21.88	PB
3rd place, bronze medalist(s)	Tomasz Majewski	Poland	21.28	21.65	x	20.94	21.72	x	21.72	NR
4	Reese Hoffa	United States	20.41	21.55	20.86	x	x	x	21.55	
5	Maksim Sidorov	Russia	20.22	20.21	20.78	x	20.50	x	20.78	
6	Germán Lauro	Argentina	20.13	20.22	19.82	19.93	20.19	20.38	20.38	
7	Rutger Smith	Netherlands	x	x	20.30	x	x	x	20.30	
8	Ivan Yushkov	Russia	19.65	20.10	19.84	19.84	19.99	19.78	20.10	
