= 2003 European Athletics U23 Championships – Men's shot put =

The men's shot put event at the 2003 European Athletics U23 Championships was held in Bydgoszcz, Poland, at Zawisza Stadion on 18 and 20 July.

== Medalists ==
Gold	Pavel Lyzhyn; Belarus
Silver	Pavel Sofyin; Russia
Bronze	Rutger Smith; Netherlands

== Results ==
=== Final ===
20 July

Rank	Name	Nationality	Attempts						Result	Notes
Rank	Name	Nationality	1	2	3	4	5	6	Result	Notes
1st place, gold medalist(s)	Pavel Lyzhyn	Belarus	20.35	x	20.43	20.24	x	x	20.43	CR
2nd place, silver medalist(s)	Pavel Sofyin	Russia	19.03	20.33	–	19.88	x	19.63	20.33	
3rd place, bronze medalist(s)	Rutger Smith	Netherlands	19.18	20.18	x	x	x	x	20.18	
4	Tomasz Majewski	Poland	19.92	x	x	x	x	19.58	19.92	
5	Ivan Yushkov	Russia	19.27	x	19.41	19.63	19.66	19.76	19.76	
6	Tomasz Chrzanowski	Poland	19.47	19.14	x	x	x	x	19.47	
7	Yury Bialou	Belarus	19.09	x	x	x	x	x	19.09	
8	Andrei Siniakou	Belarus	18.54	18.05	18.39	x	x	18.73	18.73	
9	Jarosław Cichocki	Poland	18.13	18.02	18.35				18.35	
10	Panagiotis Bacharidis	Greece	17.83	x	18.18				18.18	
11	Mika Vasara	Finland	x	17.70	17.61				17.70	
12	Marco Fortes	Portugal	17.20	17.58	17.61				17.61	

=== Qualifications ===
18 July
Qualifying 18.70 or 12 best to the Final

Rank	Name	Nationality	Result	Notes
1	Ivan Yushkov	Russia	19.56	Q
2	Tomasz Majewski	Poland	19.32	Q
3	Pavel Lyzhyn	Belarus	19.17	Q
4	Rutger Smith	Netherlands	18.93	Q
5	Pavel Sofyin	Russia	18.86	Q
6	Yury Bialou	Belarus	18.68	q
7	Tomasz Chrzanowski	Poland	18.54	q
8	Jarosław Cichocki	Poland	18.49	q
9	Mika Vasara	Finland	18.03	q
10	Marco Fortes	Portugal	17.96	q
11	Andrei Siniakou	Belarus	17.84	q
12	Panagiotis Bacharidis	Greece	17.71	q
13	Tomas Keinys	Lithuania	17.69	
14	Robert Häggblom	Finland	17.65	
15	Māris Urtāns	Latvia	17.61	
16	Mihail Stamatoyiannis	Greece	17.42	
17	José María Peña	Spain	16.65	
18	Mikko Kurunsaari	Finland	16.37	
	Taavi Peetre	Estonia	NM	

== Participation ==
According to an unofficial count, 19 athletes from 11 countries participated in the event.

- Belarus (3)
- Estonia (1)
- Finland (3)
- Greece (2)
- Latvia (1)
- Lithuania (1)
- Netherlands (1)
- Poland (3)
- Portugal (1)
- Russia (2)
- Spain (1)
