= 2009 European Athletics Indoor Championships – Men's shot put =

The Men's shot put event at the 2009 European Athletics Indoor Championships was held on March 7–8.

== Medalists ==
Gold	Silver	Bronze
Tomasz Majewski; Poland	Yves Niaré; France	Ralf Bartels; Germany

== Results ==
=== Qualification ===
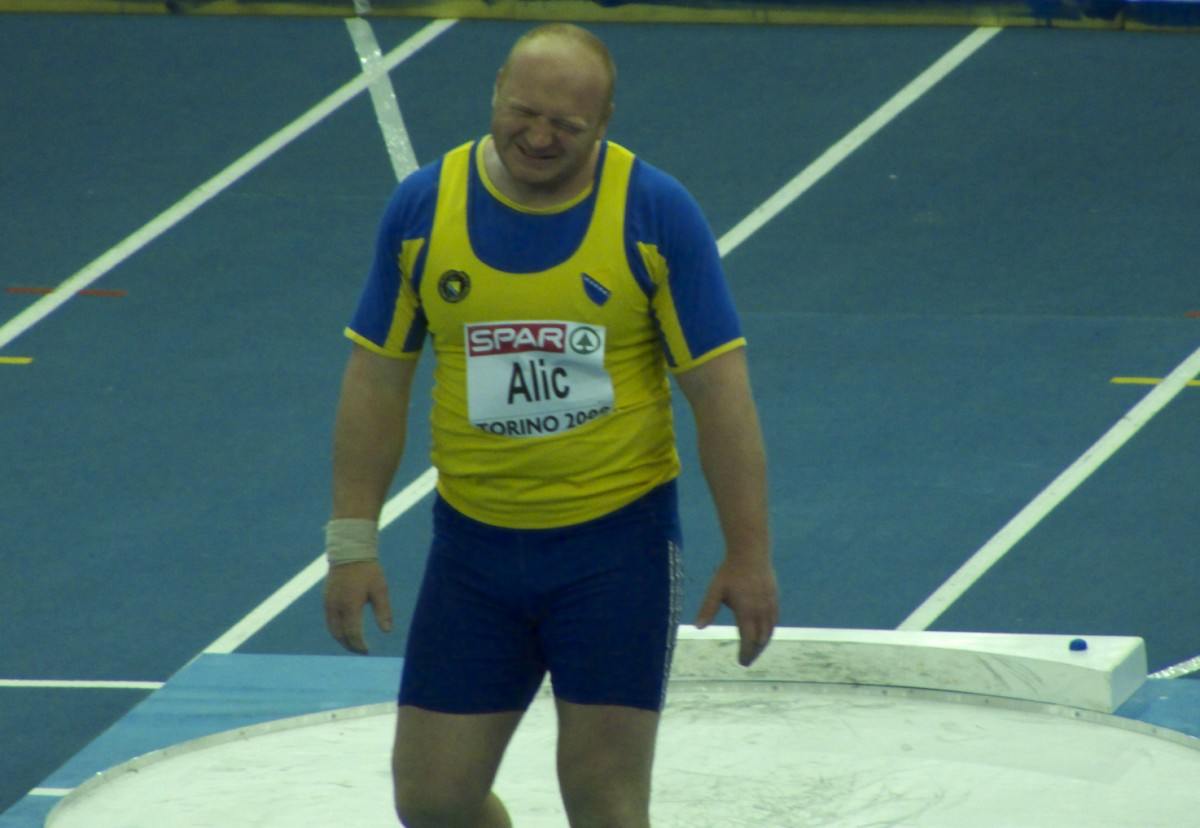
Hamza Alić of Bosnia and Herzegovina during the qualification round.

Qualifying perf. 19.80 (Q) or 8 best performers (q) advanced to the Final.

Rank	Athlete	Nationality	#1	#2	#3	Result	Note
1	Ralf Bartels	Germany	18.80	x	19.94	19.94	Q
2	Anton Lyuboslavskiy	Russia	19.61	19.29	19.92	19.92	Q
3	Manuel Martínez	Spain	19.40	19.23	19.92	19.92	Q, SB
4	Tomasz Majewski	Poland	19.86			19.86	Q
5	Lajos Kürthy	Hungary	19.85			19.85	Q
6	Milan Haborák	Slovakia	19.50	19.57	19.76	19.76	q
7	Yves Niaré	France	19.42	19.76	19.48	19.76	q
8	Andrei Siniakou	Belarus	18.82	19.03	19.66	19.66	q, SB
9	Miran Vodovnik	Slovenia	18.72	19.56	19.50	19.56	
10	Kim Christensen	Denmark	18.43	19.55	x	19.55	
11	Hamza Alić	Bosnia and Herzegovina	19.17	19.41	19.26	19.41	
12	Marco Schmidt	Germany	19.38	18.93	x	19.38	
13	Andy Dittmar	Germany	19.10	19.10	18.90	19.10	
14	Marco Fortes	Portugal	18.68	19.00	18.83	19.00	
15	Nedžad Mulabegović	Croatia	18.43	x	18.96	18.96	
16	Pavel Sofin	Russia	18.79	x	x	18.79	
17	Daniel Vanek	Slovakia	17.51	18.78	18.40	18.78	
18	Carl Myerscough	Great Britain	18.65	x	x	18.65	SB
19	Borja Vivas	Spain	18.37	18.44	x	18.44	
20	Raigo Toompuu	Estonia	18.14	x	18.27	18.27	
21	Maksim Sidorov	Russia	17.37	x	18.01	18.01	
22	Nick Petersen	Denmark	17.47	17.97	17.41	17.97	
23	Georgios Arestis	Cyprus	17.65	x	17.47	17.65	

=== Final ===
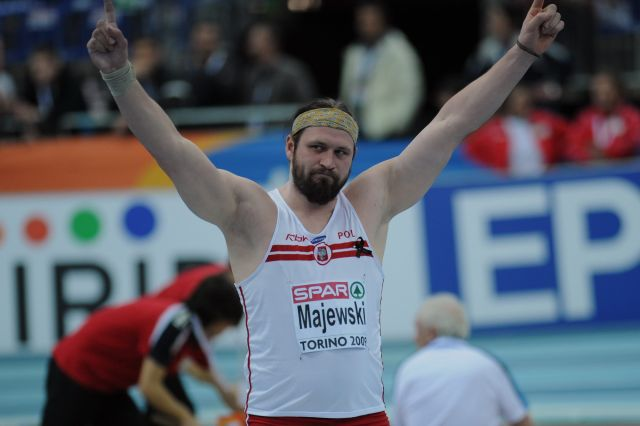
Tomasz Majewski of Poland was the winner of the event.

Rank	Athlete	Nationality	#1	#2	#3	#4	#5	#6	Result	Note
1st place, gold medalist(s)	Tomasz Majewski	Poland	20.05	20.76	20.06	x	21.02	x	21.02	
2nd place, silver medalist(s)	Yves Niaré	France	19.61	19.90	19.46	x	19.79	20.42	20.42	NR
3rd place, bronze medalist(s)	Ralf Bartels	Germany	18.97	19.90	20.39	19.95	19.77	20.27	20.39	SB
4	Anton Lyuboslavskiy	Russia	19.08	19.57	20.14	x	19.76	20.02	20.14	SB
5	Lajos Kürthy	Hungary	19.47	20.04	19.75	19.42	20.02	19.87	20.04	PB
6	Manuel Martínez	Spain	19.11	x	19.11	x	19.65	x	19.65	
7	Milan Haborák	Slovakia	19.18	x	x	x	x	19.51	19.51	
8	Andrei Siniakou	Belarus	x	19.14	x	18.73	19.25	18.74	19.25	
