= 2009 World Championships in Athletics – Men's shot put =

International shot put competition

The Men's Shot Put event at the 2009 World Championships in Athletics was held at the Olympic Stadium on August 15. The Olympic champion Tomasz Majewski entered the competition as the world-leading athlete and one of the favourites. Much was expected of the four-man United States team, consisting of defending champion Reese Hoffa, Olympic silver medalist Christian Cantwell, former world champion Adam Nelson, and newcomer Dan Taylor.

Cantwell won the competition, recording a world-leading 22.03 m throw to fend off second-placed Majewski (who managed 21.91 m). Former champions Hoffa and Nelson were beaten to the bronze medal by German Ralf Bartels, who threw a new personal best of 21.37 m to win the host nation's first medal of the tournament.

== Medalists ==
Gold	Christian Cantwell; United States (USA)
Silver	Tomasz Majewski; Poland (POL)
Bronze	Ralf Bartels; Germany (GER)

== Records ==
World record	Randy Barnes (USA)	23.12	Westwood, United States	20 May 1990
Championship record	Werner Günthör (SUI)	22.23	Rome, Italy	29 August 1987
World Leading	Tomasz Majewski (POL)	21.95	Stockholm, Sweden	30 July 2009
African record	Janus Robberts (RSA)	21.97	Eugene, United States	2 June 2001
Asian record	Sultan Abdulmajeed Al-Hebshi (KSA)	21.13	Doha, Qatar	8 May 2009
North American record	Randy Barnes (USA)	23.12	Westwood, United States	20 May 1990
South American record	Marco Antonio Verni (CHI)	21.14	Santiago, Chile	29 July 2004
European record	Ulf Timmermann (GDR)	23.06	Chania, Greece	22 May 1988
Oceanian record	Scott Martin (AUS)	21.26	Melbourne, Australia	21 February 2008

== Qualification standards ==
A standard	B standard
20.30m	19.90m

== Schedule ==
Date	Time	Round
August 15, 2009	10:00	Qualification
August 15, 2009	20:15	Final

== Results ==
=== Qualification ===
Qualification: Qualifying Performance 20.30 (Q) or at least 12 best performers (q) advance to the final.

Rank	Group	Athlete	Nationality	#1	#2	#3	Result	Notes
1	A	Tomasz Majewski	Poland	21.19			21.19	Q
2	A	Pavel Lyzhyn	Belarus	x	20.72		20.72	Q
3	A	Christian Cantwell	United States	20.20	20.63		20.63	Q
4	A	Adam Nelson	United States	20.50			20.50	Q
5	B	Ralf Bartels	Germany	20.16	x	20.41	20.41	Q
6	B	Reese Hoffa	United States	20.23	19.90	x	20.23	q
7	A	Miroslav Vodovnik	Slovenia	19.80	20.22	20.05	20.22	q, SB
8	A	Peter Sack	Germany	20.09	20.20	19.98	20.20	q
9	B	Carl Myerscough	Great Britain & N.I.	20.17	x	19.79	20.17	q
10	A	Pavel Sofin	Russia	x	x	20.16	20.16	q
11	A	Hamza Alić	Bosnia and Herzegovina	x	20.01	20.10	20.10	q
12	A	Sultan Abdulmajeed Al-Hebshi	Saudi Arabia	19.91	x	20.04	20.04	
13	A	Justin Anlezark	Australia	19.94	19.41	19.33	19.94	
14	B	Taavi Peetre	Estonia	19.91	19.79	19.69	19.91	
15	A	Māris Urtāns	Latvia	19.89	x	x	19.89	SB
16	A	Dylan Armstrong	Canada	19.46	19.86	x	19.86	
17	B	Marco Fortes	Portugal	18.70	x	19.81	19.81	
18	B	Manuel Martínez	Spain	19.74	19.80	19.73	19.80	
19	B	Antonin Žalský	Czech Republic	19.63	19.46	19.77	19.77	
20	B	Yury Bialou	Belarus	19.38	19.75	19.35	19.75	
21	B	Asmir Kolašinac	Serbia	19.62	19.67	x	19.67	
22	B	Lajos Kürthy	Hungary	19.16	19.64	x	19.64	
23	A	Carlos Véliz	Cuba	18.82	19.62	19.48	19.62	
24	B	Scott Martin	Australia	19.16	19.52	19.45	19.52	
25	B	Dan Taylor	United States	x	x	19.39	19.39	
26	B	Yves Niaré	France	x	x	19.37	19.37	
27	B	David Storl	Germany	19.19	x	19.18	19.19	
28	A	Nedžad Mulabegović	Croatia	19.15	x	x	19.15	
29	A	Valeriy Kokoyev	Russia	18.02	19.13	18.90	19.13	
30	B	Maksim Sidorov	Russia	18.92	18.77	x	18.92	
31	A	Yasser Ibrahim Farag	Egypt	18.40	18.69	18.54	18.69	
32	A	Borja Vivas	Spain	17.70	18.38	x	18.38	
33	B	Georgi Ivanov	Bulgaria	18.11	x	x	18.11	
34	A	Adriatik Hoxha	Albania	15.78	15.89	x	15.89	
	B	Germán Lauro	Argentina	x	x	x	NM	
	B	~~Andrei Mikhnevich~~	~~Belarus~~	~~20.65~~			~~20.65~~	DQ

Key: NM = No mark, Q = qualification by place in heat, q = qualification by overall place, SB = Seasonal best

=== Final ===
Rank	Athlete	Nationality	#1	#2	#3	#4	#5	#6	Result	Notes
1st place, gold medalist(s)	Christian Cantwell	United States	21.54	20.72	21.03	21.21	22.03	–	22.03	WL
2nd place, silver medalist(s)	Tomasz Majewski	Poland	21.36	21.19	20.80	21.68	21.91	21.18	21.91	
3rd place, bronze medalist(s)	Ralf Bartels	Germany	20.35	20.18	21.37	20.80	20.94	21.20	21.37	PB
4	Reese Hoffa	United States	21.02	x	20.95	21.14	20.97	21.28	21.28	
5	Adam Nelson	United States	21.11	20.93	x	x	x	x	21.11	SB
6	Pavel Lyzhyn	Belarus	x	20.98	x	x	x	x	20.98	PB
7	Miroslav Vodovnik	Slovenia	19.60	19.50	20.50	x	19.82	20.14	20.50	SB
8	Hamza Alić	Bosnia and Herzegovina	20.00	x	19.80				20.00	
9	Pavel Sofin	Russia	19.89	19.69	19.85				19.89	
10	Carl Myerscough	Great Britain & N.I.	18.42	x	x				18.42	
	Peter Sack	Germany	x	x	x				NM	
	~~Andrei Mikhnevich~~	~~Belarus~~	~~20.34~~	~~20.31~~	~~20.62~~	~~20.74~~	~~20.54~~	~~x~~	~~20.74~~	DQ

Key: PB = Personal best, SB = Seasonal best, WL = World leading (in a given season)

== See also ==
- 2009 Shot Put Year Ranking
