= Māris Urtāns =

Latvian shot putter

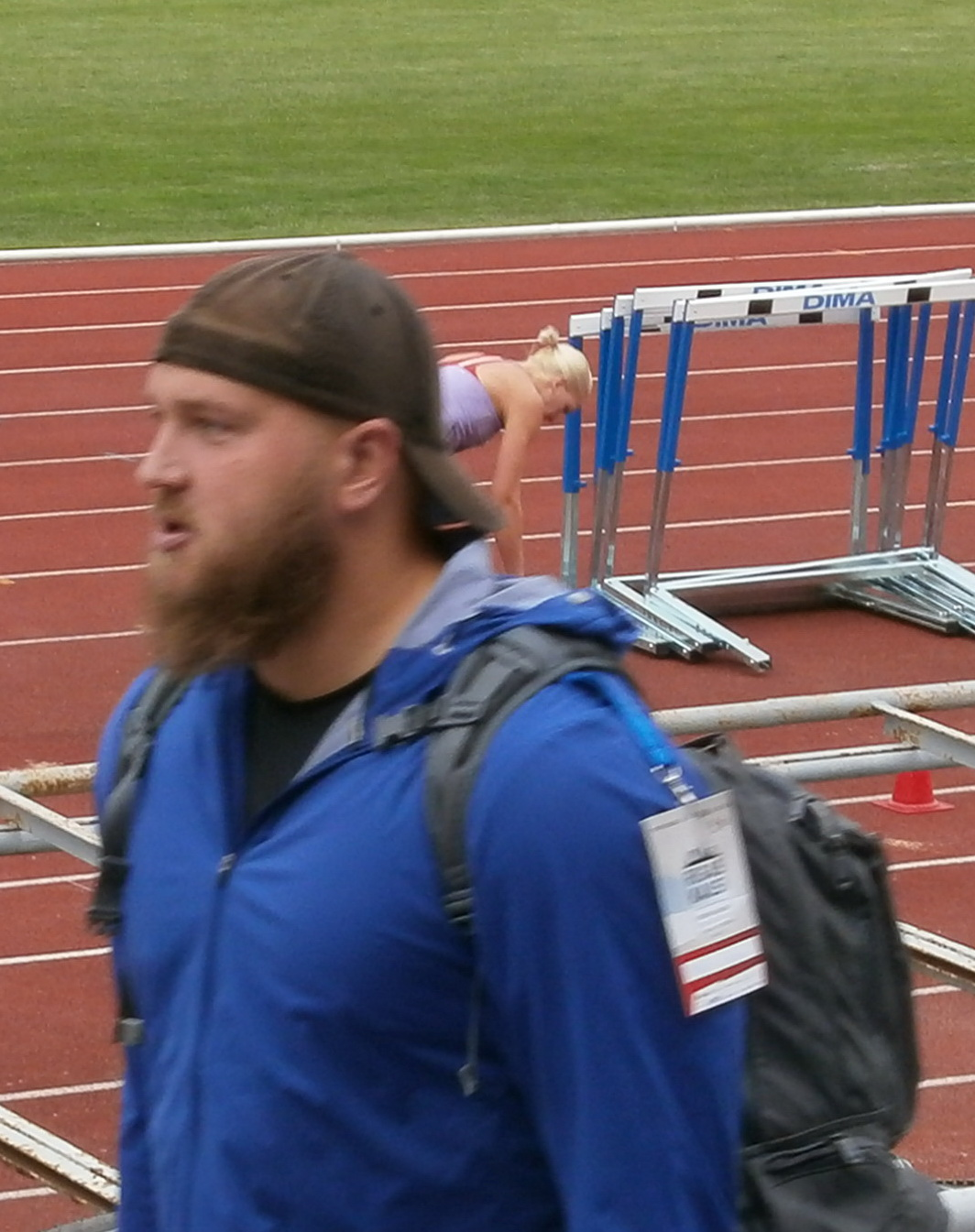
- Urtāns in 2012

Personal information
- Nationality: Latvian
- Born: 9 February 1981 (age 45) Riga, Latvian SSR, Soviet Union
- Height: 1.88 m (6 ft 2 in)
- Weight: 123 kg (271 lb)

Sport
- Country: Latvia
- Sport: Track and field
- Event: Shot put

Achievements and titles
- Olympic finals: 2008
- Personal bests: Shot put: 21.63m; Discus throw: 53.72m

Māris Urtāns (born 9 February 1981) is a Latvian shot putter. His personal best throw is 21.63 metres, achieved on 19 June 2010 in Belgrade.

He finished ninth at the 2005 Summer Universiade and won the silver medal at the 2007 Summer Universiade. He also competed at the 2006 European Championships, the 2007 and 2009 World Championships, the 2008 Olympic Games and the 2012 Olympic Games without reaching the final.

== Competition record ==
Year	Competition	Venue	Position	Event	Notes
Representing Latvia
2000	World Junior Championships	Santiago, Chile	14th (q)	Discus	50.63 m
2001	European U23 Championships	Amsterdam, Netherlands	18th (q)	Discus	49.40 m
2003	European U23 Championships	Bydgoszcz, Poland	13th (q)	Shot put	17.61 m
2005	Universiade	İzmir, Turkey	9th	Shot put	18.07 m
2006	European Championships	Gothenburg, Sweden	23rd (q)	Shot put	18.40 m
2007	European Indoor Championships	Birmingham, United Kingdom	15th (q)	Shot put	18.59 m
2007	Universiade	Bangkok, Thailand	2nd	Shot put	19.38 m
2007	World Championships	Osaka, Japan	24th (q)	Shot put	19.17 m
2008	Olympic Games	Beijing, China	25th (q)	Shot put	19.57 m
2009	Universiade	Belgrade, Serbia	5th	Shot put	19.09 m
2009	World Championships	Berlin, Germany	15th (q)	Shot put	19.89 m
2010	World Indoor Championships	Doha, Qatar	12th (q)	Shot put	19.97 m
2010	European Championships	Barcelona, Spain	3rd	Shot put	20.72 m
2011	European Indoor Championships	Paris, France	12th (q)	Shot put	19.32 m
2012	European Championships	Helsinki, Finland	15th (q)	Shot put	19.25 m
2012	Olympic Games	London, United Kingdom	26th (q)	Shot put	19.13 m
2014	European Championships	Zurich, Switzerland	23rd (q)	Shot put	18.35 m
2015	European Indoor Championships	Prague, Czech Republic	–	Shot put	NM
