= Francisco Guzmán (shot putter) =

Mexican athletics competitor

Personal information
- Full name: Francisco Guzmán Ruiz
- Born: August 2, 1978 (age 47) Mexico City, Mexico

Sport
- Country: Mexico
- Sport: Athletics
Medal record
Men's Athletics
Representing Mexico
Central American and Caribbean Championships
Silver medal – second place	2003 Grenada	Shot put

Francisco "Frank" Guzmán Ruiz (born 2 August 1978) is a Mexican-American shot putter.

== Career ==
Guzmán grew up as a Mexican-American, and was a multi-sport athlete at Schaumburg High School in Illinois. He competed collegiately for the DePaul Blue Demons track and field team in Chicago, Illinois. Mexican track coach Elbert Pratt saw Guzmán's talent and encouraged him to apply for the Mexican team at the 2003 Pan American Games. His selection for the team was controversial, as he had not represented Mexico internationally before and his selection would have bumped out one other Mexican shot putter. In order to qualify for the team per FMAA rules, Guzmán had to compete in at least one shot put competition in Mexico with at least three competitors. Despite a boycott organized by the Mexican shot putter left off the team, a competition meeting these requirements was set up by Pratt for Guzmán against two Mexican teenagers. Guzmán broke the Mexican record at that meet and finished 9th at the Pan American Games for Mexico with a throw of 17.39 m.

The highlight of Guzmán's career was a silver medal at the Central American and Caribbean Championships in 2003, with a throw of 17.82 meters. At the Ibero-American Championships, he finished 5th in 2004 with a throw of 17.90 meters.

In world-level competitions, Guzmán finished thirteenth at the 2003 Universiade, with a throw of 17.89 meters.

His personal best put is 19.73 meters, achieved on 5 June 2004.

== Achievements ==
Year	Competition	Venue	Position	Event	Notes
Representing Mexico
2003	Central American and Caribbean Championships	St. George's, Grenada	2nd	Shot put	17.82 m
2003	Pan American Games	Santo Domingo, Dominican Republic	9th	Shot put	17.39 m
2003	Universiade	Daegu, South Korea	13th	Shot put	17.89 m
2004	Ibero-American Championships	Huelva, Spain	5th	Shot put	17.90 m
