= Sergiu Ursu =

Romanian discus thrower (born 1980)

Sergiu Ursu (born April 26, 1980) is a Romanian discus thrower. Originally from the Republic of Moldova, he transferred to compete for Romania from 2003 onwards. He represented his adopted country twice at both the World Championships in Athletics and European Athletics Championships.

He was banned for two years from February 2004 after a positive test for Nandrolone. In 2013 Urzu tested positive for Norandrosterone in an out of competition test, and was given another two-year sanction.

== International competitions ==
Year	Competition	Venue	Position	Event	Notes
Representing Moldova
2001	European U23 Championships	Amsterdam, Netherlands	7th	Shot put	18.59 m
Representing Romania
2003	World Championships	Paris, France	13th	Discus	61.98
2006	European Championships	Gothenburg, Sweden	9th	Discus	62.48
2007	World Championships	Osaka, Japan	25th	Discus	59.22
2010	European Championships	Barcelona, Spain	8th	Discus	63.11
2013	Jeux de la Francophonie	Nice France, Spain	1st	Discus	62.87

== See also ==
- List of doping cases in athletics
