= Anton Lyuboslavskiy =

Russian shot putter

Anton Andreyevich Lyuboslavskiy (Russian: Антон Андреевич Любославский; born 26 June 1984, in Irkutsk) is a Russian shot putter.

His personal best is 20.77 metres, achieved in August 2007 in Tula.

== International competitions ==
Year	Competition	Venue	Position	Event	Notes
Representing Russia
2002	World Junior Championships	Kingston, Jamaica	17th (q)	Shot put (6 kg)	17.77 m
2003	European Junior Championships	Tampere, Finland	2nd	Shot put (6 kg)	20.10 m
2005	European U23 Championships	Erfurt, Germany	1st	Shot put	20.44 m
2005	World Championships	Helsinki, Finland	13th (q)	Shot put	19.56 m
2005	Universiade	İzmir, Turkey	3rd	Shot put	19.40 m
2006	World Indoor Championships	Moscow, Russia	7th	Shot put	19.93 m
2006	European Championships	Gothenburg, Sweden	9th	Shot put	19.44 m
2007	European Indoor Championships	Birmingham, United Kingdom	10th (q)	Shot put	19.12 m
2007	World Championships	Osaka, Japan	12th (q)	Shot put	19.91 m
2008	Olympic Games	Beijing, China	18th (q)	Shot put	19.87 m
2009	European Indoor Championships	Turin, Italy	4th	Shot put	20.14 m
