= 2001 European Athletics U23 Championships – Men's shot put =

The men's shot put event at the 2001 European Athletics U23 Championships was held in Amsterdam, Netherlands, at Olympisch Stadion on 14 and 15 July.

== Medalists ==
Gold	Mikuláš Konopka; Slovakia
Silver	Yuriy Belov; Belarus
Bronze	Leszek Śliwa; Poland

== Results ==
=== Final ===
15 July

Rank	Name	Nationality	Attempts						Result	Notes
Rank	Name	Nationality	1	2	3	4	5	6	Result	Notes
1st place, gold medalist(s)	Mikuláš Konopka	Slovakia	19.79	x	19.55	19.76	x	x	19.79	CR
2nd place, silver medalist(s)	Yuriy Belov	Belarus	x	19.07	x	x	19.38	x	19.38	
3rd place, bronze medalist(s)	Leszek Śliwa	Poland	18.32	19.08	18.96	x	18.53	19.08	19.08	
4	Jimmy Nordin	Sweden	17.97	18.99	x	18.78	x	19.04	19.04	
5	Ivan Yushkov	Russia	18.85	x	18.96	x	x	18.75	18.96	
6	Łukasz Wenta	Poland	18.84	17.82	18.07	x	x	18.66	18.84	
7	Sergiu Ursu	Moldova	18.58	17.59	18.25	18.59	18.29	18.28	18.59	
8	Pavel Lyzhyn	Belarus	18.57	x	x	x	17.79	18.59	18.59	
9	Peter Sack	Germany	18.26	x	x				18.26	
10	Tomasz Chrzanowski	Poland	17.82	18.03	x				18.03	
11	Nedžad Mulabegović	Croatia	x	17.66	x				17.66	
12	Gaëtan Bucki	France	16.88	17.11	x				17.11	

=== Qualifications ===
14 July
Qualifying 18.70 or 12 best to the Final

==== Group A ====
Rank	Name	Nationality	Result	Notes
1	Mikuláš Konopka	Slovakia	19.33	Q
2	Tomasz Chrzanowski	Poland	19.16	Q
3	Leszek Śliwa	Poland	18.34	q
4	Pavel Lyzhyn	Belarus	18.23	q
5	Peter Sack	Germany	18.10	q
6	Christos Sarakoglou	Greece	17.79	
7	Aukusitino Hoatau	France	17.65	
8	Antonín Žalský	Czech Republic	17.23	
9	Iñaki Romero	Spain	16.88	
10	Tomas Keinys	Lithuania	16.26	

==== Group B ====
Rank	Name	Nationality	Result	Notes
1	Yuriy Belov	Belarus	18.59	q
2	Łukasz Wenta	Poland	18.57	q
3	Ivan Yushkov	Russia	18.54	q
4	Nedžad Mulabegović	Croatia	18.51	q
5	Jimmy Nordin	Sweden	18.45	q
6	Sergiu Ursu	Moldova	18.24	q
7	Gaëtan Bucki	France	17.99	q
8	Teijo Kööpikää	Finland	17.86	
9	Gábor Máté	Hungary	17.24	
10	Panagiotis Bacharidis	Greece	17.23	
	Michal Oertelt	Czech Republic	NM	

== Participation ==
According to an unofficial count, 21 athletes from 15 countries participated in the event.

- Belarus (2)
- Croatia (1)
- Czech Republic (2)
- Finland (1)
- France (2)
- Germany (1)
- Greece (2)
- Hungary (1)
- Lithuania (1)
- Moldova (1)
- Poland (3)
- Russia (1)
- Slovakia (1)
- Spain (1)
- Sweden (1)
