= 2000 World Junior Championships in Athletics – Men's discus throw =

The men's discus throw event at the 2000 World Junior Championships in Athletics was held in Santiago, Chile, at Estadio Nacional Julio Martínez Prádanos on 20 and 21 October. A 2 kg (senior implement) discus was used.

== Medalists ==
Gold	Hannes Hopley; South Africa
Silver	Niklas Arrhenius; Sweden
Bronze	Rutger Smith; Netherlands

== Results ==
=== Final ===
21 October

Rank	Name	Nationality	Attempts						Result	Notes
Rank	Name	Nationality	1	2	3	4	5	6	Result	Notes
1st place, gold medalist(s)	Hannes Hopley	South Africa	58.01	56.82	x	52.93	59.51	56.52	59.51	
2nd place, silver medalist(s)	Niklas Arrhenius	Sweden	53.48	53.63	51.57	56.32	59.19	x	59.19	
3rd place, bronze medalist(s)	Rutger Smith	Netherlands	56.39	58.70	x	x	x	x	58.70	
4	Michał Hodun	Poland	54.86	56.58	55.73	x	58.62	57.86	58.62	
5	Rashid Al-Dosari	Qatar	56.28	58.29	56.71	x	x	55.82	58.29	
6	Loy Martínez	Cuba	54.93	56.94	55.37	55.51	x	x	56.94	
7	Pavel Lyzhin	Belarus	56.24	x	54.20	54.95	x	x	56.24	
8	Krishnakumar Sharma	India	51.65	x	51.55	x	x	52.01	52.01	
9	Julian Ames	United States	51.09	x	51.61				51.61	
10	Manuel Florido	Spain	51.01	51.61	x				51.61	
11	Ivan Napreyenko	Ukraine	50.56	x	49.86				50.56	
12	Nicolas Deldycke	France	x	x	50.47				50.47	

=== Qualifications ===
20 October

==== Group A ====
Rank	Name	Nationality	Attempts			Result	Notes
Rank	Name	Nationality	1	2	3	Result	Notes
1	Hannes Hopley	South Africa	57.12	-	-	57.12	Q
2	Rashid Al-Dosari	Qatar	x	53.84	54.84	54.84	q
3	Julian Ames	United States	50.70	53.63	45.27	53.63	q
4	Pavel Lyzhin	Belarus	49.46	51.09	52.85	52.85	q
5	Michał Hodun	Poland	x	52.69	x	52.69	q
6	Krishnakumar Sharma	India	50.41	52.06	51.70	52.06	q
7	Nicolas Deldycke	France	x	50.91	47.22	50.91	q
8	Matej Gasaj	Slovakia	50.48	x	50.19	50.48	
9	Dylan Armstrong	Canada	49.53	48.75	x	49.53	
10	Georgios Arestis	Cyprus	x	48.10	44.36	48.10	
11	Nedžad Mulabegović	Croatia	47.48	46.09	46.90	47.48	
12	Marco Fortes	Portugal	x	46.32	x	46.32	
13	Christian Nordgård	Norway	41.20	45.58	x	45.58	
14	Staffan Jönsson	Sweden	45.51	x	43.25	45.51	

==== Group B ====
Rank	Name	Nationality	Attempts			Result	Notes
Rank	Name	Nationality	1	2	3	Result	Notes
1	Rutger Smith	Netherlands	56.14	-	-	56.14	Q
2	Loy Martínez	Cuba	x	54.40	54.37	54.40	q
3	Niklas Arrhenius	Sweden	x	51.61	54.38	54.38	q
4	Manuel Florido	Spain	x	51.24	x	51.24	q
5	Ivan Napreyenko	Ukraine	49.44	50.84	x	50.84	q
6	Peter Jahn	Germany	50.80	50.52	x	50.80	
7	Māris Urtāns	Latvia	50.63	50.54	47.43	50.63	
8	Scott Martin	Australia	x	44.59	50.56	50.56	
9	Omar El-Ghazaly	Egypt	50.43	48.24	47.11	50.43	
10	Edis Elkasević	Croatia	x	48.94	47.02	48.94	
11	Encho Shterev	Bulgaria	46.79	48.31	x	48.31	
12	Ömer Inan	United States	x	48.09	45.98	48.09	
13	Chang Ming-Huang	Chinese Taipei	47.55	47.45	48.07	48.07	
14	Jean-François Aurokiom	France	45.52	47.77	x	47.77	
15	Adam Major	United Kingdom	x	45.34	x	45.34	
16	Dmitriy Kondratenko	Kazakhstan	x	43.53	45.03	45.03	

== Participation ==
According to an unofficial count, 30 athletes from 26 countries participated in the event.

- Australia (1)
- Belarus (1)
- Bulgaria (1)
- Canada (1)
- Chinese Taipei (1)
- Croatia (2)
- Cuba (1)
- Cyprus (1)
- Egypt (1)
- France (2)
- Germany (1)
- India (1)
- Kazakhstan (1)
- Latvia (1)
- Netherlands (1)
- Norway (1)
- Poland (1)
- Portugal (1)
- Qatar (1)
- Slovakia (1)
- South Africa (1)
- Spain (1)
- Sweden (2)
- Ukraine (1)
- United Kingdom (1)
- United States (2)
