= Gaëtan Bucki =

French shot putter

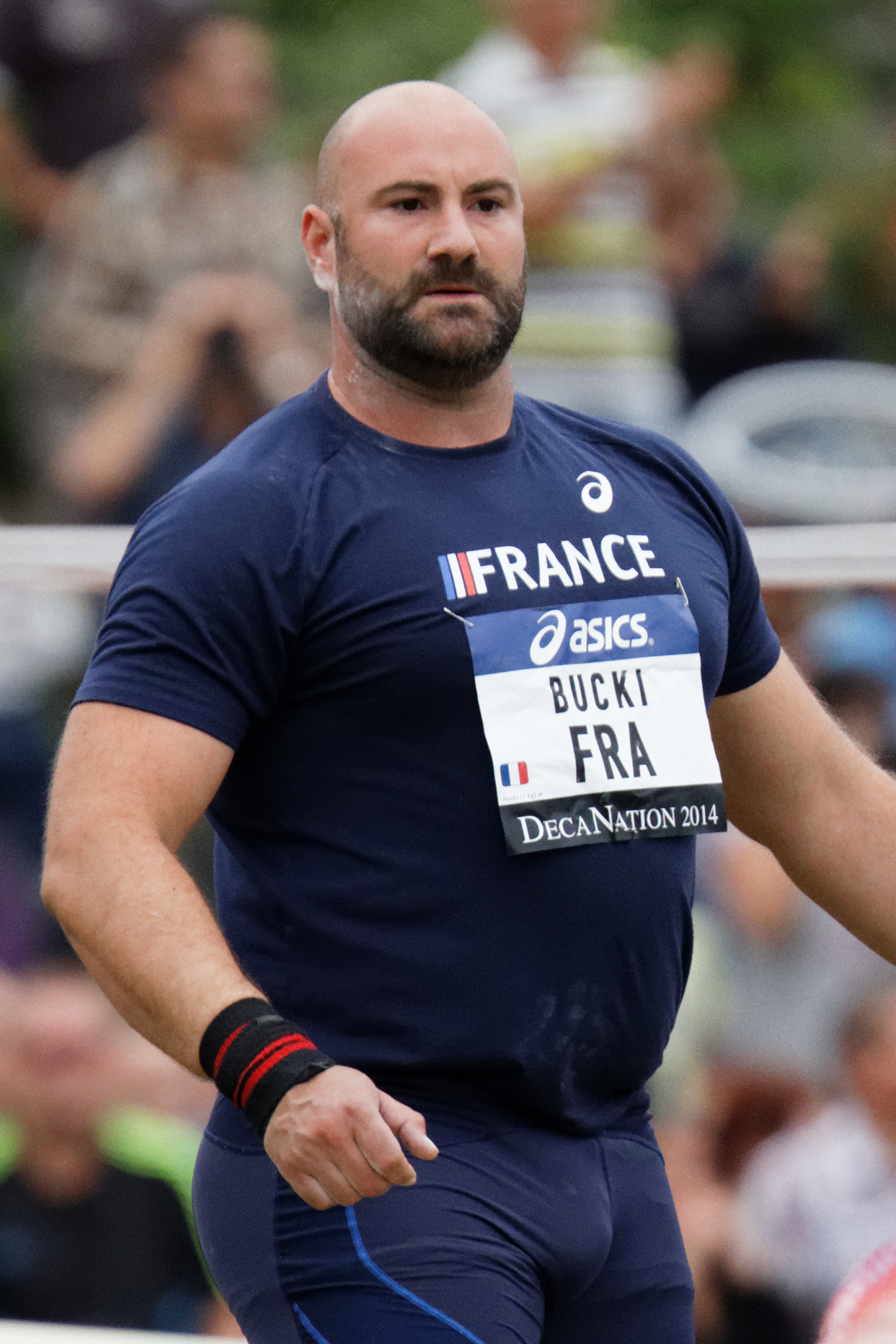
Gaëtan Bucki at the DécaNation 2014.

Gaëtan Bucki (born 9 May 1980 in Béthune, Pas-de-Calais) is a French shot putter.

== Achievements ==
Year	Competition	Venue	Position	Notes
Representing France
1999	European Junior Championships	Riga, Latvia	14th (q)	15.40 m
2001	European U23 Championships	Amsterdam, Netherlands	12th	17.11 m
2003	Universiade	Daegu, South Korea	8th	18.69 m
2005	European Indoor Championships	Madrid, Spain	18th (q)	18.86 m
2005	Mediterranean Games	Almería, Spain	6th	18.61 m
2006	European Championships	Gothenburg, Sweden	19th (q)	18.94 m
2006	World Cup	Athens, Greece	6th	19.40 m
2007	European Indoor Championships	Birmingham, United Kingdom	7th	20.07 m
2009	Mediterranean Games	Pescara, Italy	5th	18.75 m
2011	European Indoor Championships	Paris, France	7th	20.07 m
2013	Jeux de la Francophonie	Nice, France	2nd	19.33 m
2014	European Championships	Zürich, Switzerland	11th	19.75 m
2015	European Indoor Championships	Prague, Czech Republic	11th (q)	19.73 m
