= 2000 World Junior Championships in Athletics – Men's shot put =

The men's shot put event at the 2000 World Junior Championships in Athletics was held in Santiago, Chile, at Estadio Nacional Julio Martínez Prádanos on 19 October. A 7257g (Senior implement) shot was used.

== Medalists ==
Gold	Rutger Smith; Netherlands
Silver	Ivan Yushkov; Russia
Bronze	Tomasz Chrzanowski; Poland

== Results ==
=== Final ===
19 October

Rank	Name	Nationality	Attempts						Result	Notes
Rank	Name	Nationality	1	2	3	4	5	6	Result	Notes
1st place, gold medalist(s)	Rutger Smith	Netherlands	18.87	19.25	19.18	x	x	19.48	19.48	
2nd place, silver medalist(s)	Ivan Yushkov	Russia	x	18.79	18.81	18.80	19.06	19.04	19.06	
3rd place, bronze medalist(s)	Tomasz Chrzanowski	Poland	18.39	x	18.92	x	19.00	18.69	19.00	
4	Pavel Lyzhin	Belarus	18.88	x	19.00	18.44	18.48	x	19.00	
5	Jeff Chakouian	United States	17.84	18.34	18.89	17.85	x	x	18.89	
6	Yury Belov	Belarus	x	x	18.13	x	18.83	x	18.83	
7	Pavel Sofin	Russia	18.14	x	18.26	x	17.83	18.10	18.26	
8	Jarosław Cichocki	Poland	18.26	x	x	x	x	x	18.26	
9	Mihaíl Stamatógiannis	Greece	16.85	17.57	18.12				18.12	
10	Rhys Jones	Australia	18.04	x	x				18.04	
11	Scott Martin	Australia	17.27	17.60	x				17.60	
12	Nedžad Mulabegović	Croatia	17.23	x	x				17.23	

=== Qualifications ===
19 October

==== Group A ====
Rank	Name	Nationality	Attempts			Result	Notes
Rank	Name	Nationality	1	2	3	Result	Notes
1	Pavel Lyzhin	Belarus	17.15	18.71	-	18.71	Q
2	Ivan Yushkov	Russia	18.01	-	-	18.01	Q
3	Jarosław Cichocki	Poland	17.22	17.92	17.65	17.92	q
4	Rhys Jones	Australia	17.88	x	17.29	17.88	q
5	Nedžad Mulabegović	Croatia	17.32	16.85	16.82	17.32	q
6	Mihaíl Stamatógiannis	Greece	16.52	17.20	17.25	17.25	q
7	Julian Ames	United States	16.45	16.25	15.47	16.45	
8	Marco Fortes	Portugal	16.36	x	15.99	16.36	
9	Francisco José Ecija	Spain	16.10	16.28	16.11	16.28	
10	Ivan Napreyenko	Ukraine	16.14	16.20	16.13	16.20	
11	Manuel Repollet	Puerto Rico	15.99	15.67	16.19	16.19	
12	Yannick Issenbeck	France	16.19	15.29	x	16.19	
13	Daniel Muñoz	Chile	15.69	x	16.16	16.16	
14	Georgios Arestis	Cyprus	x	16.09	15.65	16.09	
15	Choe Tae-Ho	South Korea	15.54	15.64	15.07	15.64	
16	Christopher Götz	Germany	x	15.57	15.18	15.57	
17	Vasile Bolozan	Romania	14.76	x	14.64	14.76	
	Khalid Habash Al-Suwaidi	Qatar	x	x	x	NM	

==== Group B ====
Rank	Name	Nationality	Attempts			Result	Notes
Rank	Name	Nationality	1	2	3	Result	Notes
1	Rutger Smith	Netherlands	17.76	18.52	-	18.52	Q
2	Yury Belov	Belarus	17.96	18.10	-	18.10	Q
3	Tomasz Chrzanowski	Poland	18.01	-	-	18.01	Q
4	Jeff Chakouian	United States	17.94	17.98	17.90	17.98	q
5	Pavel Sofin	Russia	16.80	17.82	17.51	17.82	q
6	Scott Martin	Australia	16.81	17.17	x	17.17	q
7	Tomas Keinys	Lithuania	17.14	x	16.46	17.14	
8	John Sullivan	South Africa	16.71	16.80	16.49	16.80	
9	Aukusitino Hoatau	France	15.49	x	16.73	16.73	
10	Greg Beard	United Kingdom	16.28	16.49	x	16.49	
11	Edmundo Martínez	Venezuela	x	16.22	15.73	16.22	
12	Mateus Monari	Brazil	15.04	15.67	16.22	16.22	
13	Panayiótis Baharídis	Greece	15.87	x	x	15.87	
14	Satoshi Hatase	Japan	15.86	15.71	15.81	15.86	
15	Kuldeep Singh Mann	India	15.68	15.59	15.78	15.78	
16	Alexander Belz	Germany	15.65	15.59	15.24	15.65	
17	Edis Elkasević	Croatia	14.38	15.13	15.57	15.57	
18	Leonardo Latorre	Argentina	x	14.11	14.12	14.12	
19	Ismaïla Doucouré	Senegal	x	11.15	x	11.15	

== Participation ==
According to an unofficial count, 37 athletes from 28 countries participated in the event.

- Argentina (1)
- Australia (2)
- Belarus (2)
- Brazil (1)
- Chile (1)
- Croatia (2)
- Cyprus (1)
- France (2)
- Germany (2)
- Greece (2)
- India (1)
- Japan (1)
- Lithuania (1)
- Netherlands (1)
- Poland (2)
- Portugal (1)
- Puerto Rico (1)
- Qatar (1)
- Romania (1)
- Russia (2)
- Senegal (1)
- South Africa (1)
- South Korea (1)
- Spain (1)
- Ukraine (1)
- United Kingdom (1)
- United States (2)
- Venezuela (1)
