= Marco Fortes =

Portuguese shot putter

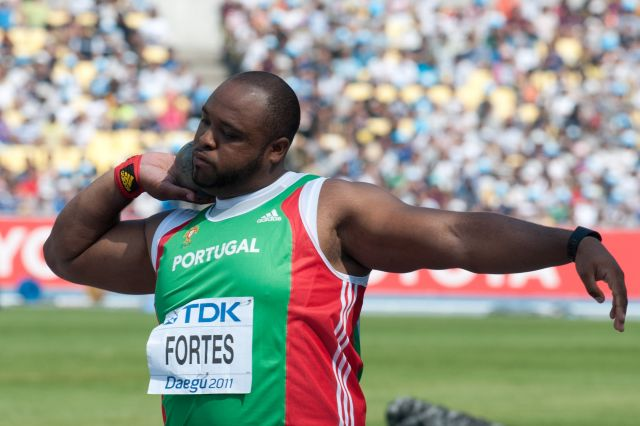
- Marco Fortes in 2011

Personal information
- Born: September 26, 1982 (age 43) Funchal, Madeira, Portugal
- Height: 1.89 m (6 ft 2 in)
- Weight: 135 kg (298 lb)

Sport
- Country: Portugal
- Sport: Athletics
- Event: Shot put
- Updated on 15 August 2012

Marco Fortes (born 26 September 1982) is a male shot putter from Portugal. His personal best throw is 21.02 meters – Portuguese record – was achieved at the 2012 European Cup Winter Throwing in Bar, Montenegro, where he won the gold medal.

== Career ==
Fortes was born in Portugal to Mozambican immigrants. At the age of 25, he was the first Portuguese shot putter to participate in the Olympics. In Beijing 2008, after beating his personal (and national) record (18.05) he jokingly stated "I seem to perform better in the afternoon. Apparently I would do better to remain in bed on mornings." In response, he was expelled from the Olympic committee. This spawned controversy, especially when Nelson Évora, who was the only Portuguese athlete to earn olympic gold that year, protested against his expulsion upon his victory speech on national TV.

Marco Fortes carried on beating his personal (and national) records, arriving at 20.52 in 2009, 20.89 in 2011, and 21,02 in 2012. In his second participation in the Olympics, in London 2012, he rose from his 2008 classification of 38th place to 15th place.

== Achievements ==
Year	Competition	Venue	Position	Event	Notes
Representing Portugal
2000	World Junior Championships	Santiago, Chile	18th (q)	Shot put	16.36 m
2000	World Junior Championships	Santiago, Chile	26th (q)	Discus	46.32 m
2001	European Junior Championships	Grosseto, Italy	3rd	Shot put (6 kg)	17.86 m
2003	European U23 Championships	Bydgoszcz, Poland	12th	Shot put	17.61 m
2004	Ibero-American Championships	Huelva, Spain	7th	Shot put	17.01 m
2006	Lusophony Games	Macau	1st	Shot put	17.73 m
2008	World Indoor Championships	Valencia, Spain	20th (q)	Shot put	17.96 m
2008	Olympic Games	Beijing, China	38th (q)	Shot put	18.05 m
2009	European Indoor Championships	Turin, Italy	14th (q)	Shot put	19.00 m
2009	Lusophony Games	Lisbon, Portugal	1st	Shot put	19.74 m
2009	World Championships	Berlin, Germany	18th (q)	Shot put	19.81 m
2010	European Championships	Barcelona, Spain	13th (q)	Shot put	19.48 m
2010	Ibero-American Championships	San Fernando, Spain	1st	Shot put	20.69 m (CR/NR)
2011	European Indoor Championships	Paris, France	8th	Shot put	19.83 m
2011	European Cup Winter Throwing	Sofia, Bulgaria	2nd	Shot put	20.18 m
2011	World Championships	Daegu, South Korea	6th	Shot put	20.32 m
2012	World Indoor Championship	Istanbul, Turkey	10th (q)	Shot put	19.83 m
2012	European Championships	Helsinki, Finland	5th	Shot put	20.24 m
2012	Olympic Games	London, United Kingdom	15th	Shot put	20.06 m
2013	European Indoor Championships	Gothenburg, Sweden	5th	Shot put	20.02 m
2013	World Championships	Moscow, Russia	16th (q)	Shot put	19.38 m
2014	World Indoor Championships	Sopot, Poland	11th (q)	Shot put	20.12 m
2014	European Championships	Zürich, Switzerland	7th	Shot put	20.35 m
2016	Ibero-American Championships	Rio de Janeiro, Brazil	2nd	Shot put	19.05 m
2016	European Championships	Amsterdam, Netherlands	23rd (q)	Shot put	18.64 m
