= Pavel Sofin =

Russian shot putter

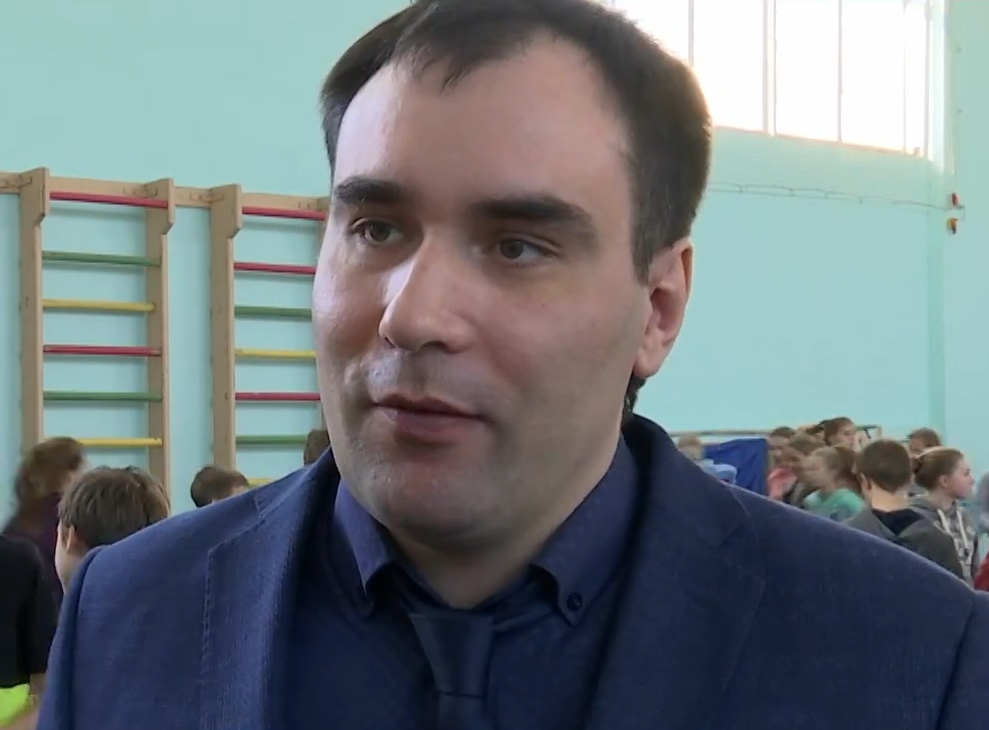
Pavel Sofin in 2018

Pavel Sofin (born 4 September 1981) is a Russian shot putter.

His personal best is 20.82 metres, achieved in September 2009 in Thessaloniki. He has 20.68 metres on the indoor track, achieved in March 2006 in Moscow.

== International competitions ==
Year	Competition	Venue	Position	Notes
Representing Russia
1999	European Junior Championships	Riga, Latvia	6th	17.12 m
2000	World Junior Championships	Santiago, Chile	7th	18.26 m
2003	European U23 Championships	Bydgoszcz, Poland	2nd	20.33 m
2003	World Championships	Paris, France	27th (q)	18.66 m
2004	World Indoor Championships	Budapest, Hungary	18th (q)	19.02 m
2004	Olympic Games	Athens, Greece	30th (q)	19.02 m
2005	European Indoor Championships	Madrid, Spain	8th	19.51 m
2006	World Indoor Championships	Moscow, Russia	3rd	20.68 m
2006	European Championships	Gothenburg, Sweden	4th	20.55 m
2006	World Cup	Athens, Greece	3rd	20.45 m
2007	World Championships	Osaka, Japan	9th	19.62 m
2008	World Indoor Championships	Valencia, Spain	9th (q)	19.95 m
2008	Olympic Games	Beijing, China	7th	20.42 m
2009	European Indoor Championships	Turin, Italy	16th (q)	18.79 m
2009	World Championships	Berlin, Germany	9th	19.89 m
