= Athletics at the 2005 Summer Universiade – Men's shot put =

The men's shot put event at the 2005 Summer Universiade was held on 20 August in İzmir, Turkey.

== Results ==
Rank	Athlete	Nationality	#1	#2	#3	#4	#5	#6	Result	Notes
1st place, gold medalist(s)	Tomasz Majewski	Poland	19.05	20.60	19.39	x	x	x	20.60	
2nd place, silver medalist(s)	Taavi Peetre	Estonia	20.02	19.58	19.56	19.72	19.31	19.63	20.02	
3rd place, bronze medalist(s)	Anton Lyuboslavskiy	Russia	19.35	18.68	19.06	x	18.57	19.40	19.40	
4	Ivan Yushkov	Russia	18.70	19.22	x	19.03	x	19.38	19.38	
5	Pavel Lyzhyn	Belarus	x	19.28	18.95	x	x	x	19.28	
6	Yury Bialou	Belarus	x	19.24	x	18.81	x	x	19.24	
7	Mehdi Shahrokhi	Iran	17.71	x	18.24	x	17.94	x	18.24	
8	Clay Cross	Australia	18.08	x	17.46	17.47	17.93	17.00	18.08	
9	Māris Urtāns	Latvia	x	17.44	18.07				18.07	
10	Roelie Potgieter	South Africa	17.25	18.03	16.97				18.03	
11	Milan Jotanović	Serbia and Montenegro	17.35	17.84	17.12				17.84	
12	Fatih Yazıcı	Turkey	x	17.69	x				17.69	
13	Salesi Ahokovi	Tonga	13.80	14.21	14.56				14.56	
14	Yevgeniy Labutov	Kazakhstan	x	14.09	14.33				14.33	
