= Athletics at the 2003 Summer Universiade – Men's shot put =

The men's shot put event at the 2003 Summer Universiade was held on 30 August in Daegu, South Korea.

== Results ==
Rank	Athlete	Nationality	#1	#2	#3	#4	#5	#6	Result	Notes
1st place, gold medalist(s)	Andrei Mikhnevich	Belarus	20.42	20.07	20.17	20.76	20.45	20.26	20.76	
2nd place, silver medalist(s)	Pavel Lyzhyn	Belarus	18.84	19.40	19.76	19.95	20.72	x	20.72	
3rd place, bronze medalist(s)	Nedžad Mulabegović	Croatia	19.16	19.27	18.97	19.88	x	19.99	19.99	
4	René Sack	Germany	19.22	18.65	18.90	18.75	x	x	19.22	
5	Tomasz Majewski	Poland	18.39	18.87	x	x	18.40	x	18.87	
6	Taavi Peetre	Estonia	18.21	18.17	18.38	x	18.47	18.73	18.73	
7	Clay Cross	Australia	18.38	18.71	x	x	18.33	x	18.71	
8	Gaëtan Bucki	France	18.57	18.69	18.52	x	x	x	18.69	
9	Roelof Potgieter	South Africa	18.36	18.13	17.51				18.36	
10	Andriy Borodkin	Ukraine	18.21	18.26	x				18.26	
11	Chris Meisner	Canada	16.81	17.08	18.21				18.21	
12	Sven Hahn	Germany	17.65	17.83	17.97				17.97	
13	Francisco Guzmán	Mexico	17.19	17.89	17.53				17.89	
14	Anton Savkin	Russia	17.15	17.76	17.24				17.76	
15	Pavel Pankuch	Slovakia	17.52	17.54	17.14				17.54	
16	Paolo Capponi	Italy	17.49	17.20	17.33				17.49	
17	Ivan Emilianov	Moldova	x	17.48	17.45				17.48	
18	Hwang In-sung	South Korea	16.47	15.92	x				16.47	
19	Salesi Ahokovi	Tonga	11.63	13.45	13.65				13.65	
	Kouadio Benoît Lingue	Ivory Coast							DNS	
