= Miroslav Vodovnik =

Slovenian shot putter

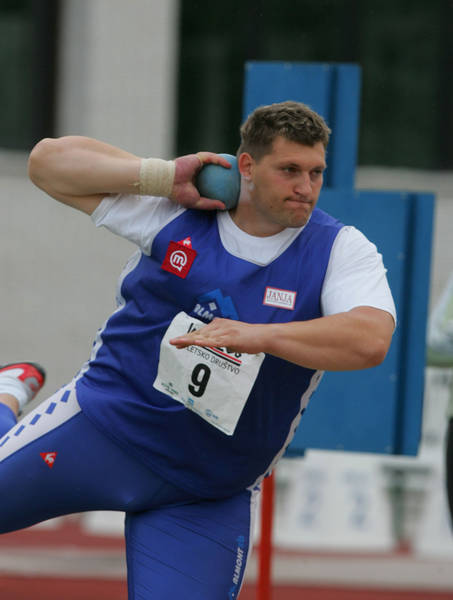
Miran Vodovnik in 2010.

Miran Vodovnik (born 11 September 1977) is a Slovenian shot putter. His personal best throw and Slovene record is 20.76 metres, achieved in June 2006 in Thessaloniki.

He finished eleventh at the 2004 Olympic Games, seventh at the 2007 European Indoor Championships and sixth at the 2007 World Championships. He also competed at the 2003 World Championships and 2005 World Championships and the 2008 Olympic Games without reaching the final.

== Competition record ==
Year	Competition	Venue	Position	Event	Notes
Representing Slovenia
1995	European Junior Championships	Nyíregyháza, Hungary	15th (q)	Shot put	15.21 m
1996	World Junior Championships	Sydney, Australia	13th (q)	Shot put	16.49 m
1996	World Junior Championships	Sydney, Australia	19th (q)	Discus	47.90 m
1999	European U23 Championships	Gothenburg, Sweden	17th (q)	Shot put	17.10 m
2003	World Championships	Paris, France	22nd (q)	Shot put	19.23 m
2004	World Indoor Championships	Budapest, Hungary	12th (q)	Shot put	19.83 m
2004	Olympic Games	Athens, Greece	10th	Shot put	19.34 m
2005	European Indoor Championships	Madrid, Spain	15th (q)	Shot put	19.01 m
2005	Mediterranean Games	Almería, Spain	4th	Shot put	19.21 m
2005	World Championships	Helsinki, Finland	18th (q)	Shot put	19.28 m
2006	World Indoor Championships	Moscow, Russia	13th (q)	Shot put	19.37 m
2007	European Indoor Championships	Birmingham, United Kingdom	6th	Shot put	19.46 m
2007	World Championships	Osaka, Japan	5th	Shot put	20.67 m
2008	World Indoor Championships	Valencia, Spain	10th (q)	Shot put	19.80 m
2008	Olympic Games	Beijing, China	20th (q)	Shot put	19.81 m
2009	European Indoor Championships	Turin, Italy	9th (q)	Shot put	19.56 m
2009	World Championships	Berlin, Germany	7th	Shot put	20.50 m
2010	World Indoor Championships	Doha, Qatar	14th (q)	Shot put	19.82 m
2010	European Championships	Barcelona, Spain	19th (q)	Shot put	18.42 m
2011	European Indoor Championships	Paris, France	17th (q)	Shot put	18.76 m
