= Andy Dittmar =

German shot putter

Andreas "Andy" Dittmar (born 5 July 1974 in Gotha) is a German athlete specialising in the shot put. He represented his country at two outdoor and four indoor European Championships.

He has personal bests of 20.55 metres outdoors (Schönebeck 2006) and 20.34 metres indoors (Nordhausen 2005).

== Competition record ==
Year	Competition	Venue	Position	Notes
Representing Germany
2000	European Indoor Championships	Ghent, Belgium	11th (q)	19.20 m
2002	European Indoor Championships	Vienna, Austria	18th (q)	19.05 m
2002	European Championships	Munich, Germany	18th (q)	18.77 m
2005	European Indoor Championships	Madrid, Spain	9th (q)	19.72 m
2006	European Championships	Gothenburg, Sweden	5th	19.95 m
2009	European Indoor Championships	Turin, Italy	13th (q)	19.10 m
