= 2011 European Athletics Indoor Championships – Men's shot put =

The Men's shot put event at the 2011 European Athletics Indoor Championships were held on March 4, 2011 at 09:30 (qualification) and March 4, 17:30 (final) local time.

== Records ==
Standing records prior to the 2011 European Athletics Indoor Championships
| World record | Randy Barnes (USA) | 22.66 | Los Angeles, United States | 20 January 1989 |
| European record | Ulf Timmermann (GDR) | 22.55 | Senftenberg, East Germany | 11 February 1989 |
| Championship record | Ulf Timmermann (GDR) | 22.19 | Liévin, France | 21 February 1987 |
| World Leading | Ryan Whiting (USA) | 21.35 | Albuquerque, United States | 27 February 2011 |
| European Leading | Ralf Bartels (GER) | 20.91 | Düsseldorf, Germany | 11 February 2011 |

== Results ==
=== Qualification ===
Qualification: Qualification Performance 20.10 (Q) or at least 8 best performers advanced to the final. It was held at 09:30.

| Rank | Athlete | Nationality | #1 | #2 | #3 | Result | Note |
|---|---|---|---|---|---|---|---|
| 1 | Gaëtan Bucki | France | 20.39 | | | 20.39 | Q, PB |
| 2 | Marco Fortes | Portugal | 19.98 | 19.37 | 20.34 | 20.34 | Q, NR |
| 3 | Ralf Bartels | Germany | 20.33 | | | 20.33 | Q |
| 4 | Maksim Sidorov | Russia | 20.19 | | | 20.19 | Q |
| 5 | Nedžad Mulabegović | Croatia | 19.80 | 19.80 | 20.05 | 20.05 | q, NR |
| 6 | David Storl | Germany | X | 20.01 | X | 20.01 | q |
| 7 | Marco Schmidt | Germany | 19.93 | X | X | 19.93 | q |
| 8 | Ivan Yushkov | Russia | 19.75 | 19.68 | X | 19.75 | q |
| 9 | Hamza Alić | Bosnia and Herzegovina | 19.51 | 19.60 | X | 19.60 | |
| 10 | Andriy Semenov | Ukraine | X | 19.47 | X | 19.47 | |
| 11 | Borja Vivas | Spain | 18.61 | 19.40 | X | 19.40 | |
| 12 | Māris Urtāns | Latvia | 19.32 | 19.23 | X | 19.32 | |
| 13 | Valeriy Kokoyev | Russia | 19.32 | X | X | 19.32 | |
| 14 | Niklas Arrhenius | Sweden | 17.28 | 19.01 | 19.21 | 19.21 | |
| 15 | Kim Christensen | Denmark | 17.85 | 19.16 | 18.19 | 19.16 | |
| 16 | Nick Petersen | Denmark | 19.00 | X | X | 19.00 | |
| 17 | Miran Vodovnik | Slovenia | 18.37 | 18.76 | 18.53 | 18.76 | |
| 18 | Lajos Kürthy | Hungary | 18.75 | X | X | 18.75 | |
| 19 | Manuel Martínez | Spain | 18.62 | X | X | 18.62 | |
| 20 | Ódinn Björn Thorsteinsson | Iceland | 17.03 | 17.31 | X | 17.31 | |
| 21 | Benik Abramyan | Georgia | X | X | 17.20 | 17.20 | |
| – | Georgi Ivanov | Bulgaria | X | X | X | | NM |
| – | Asmir Kolašinac | Serbia | X | X | X | | NM |

=== Final ===
| Rank | Athlete | Nationality | #1 | #2 | #3 | #4 | #5 | #6 | Result | Note |
|---|---|---|---|---|---|---|---|---|---|---|
| 1st place, gold medalist(s) | Ralf Bartels | Germany | 19.74 | 20.80 | 20.79 | 21.16 | x | 21.09 | 21.16 | EL |
| 2nd place, silver medalist(s) | David Storl | Germany | x | 20.29 | 20.75 | x | x | x | 20.75 | SB |
| 3rd place, bronze medalist(s) | Maksim Sidorov | Russia | 20.46 | 20.55 | x | x | 20.17 | x | 20.55 | |
| 4 | Nedžad Mulabegović | Croatia | x | x | x | 19.63 | 20.43 | x | 20.43 | NR |
| 5 | Marco Schmidt | Germany | x | 20.29 | 19.71 | 19.91 | x | 19.62 | 20.29 | |
| 6 | Ivan Yushkov | Russia | x | 20.04 | 20.19 | x | 19.99 | x | 20.19 | |
| 7 | Gaëtan Bucki | France | 20.07 | 20.00 | x | x | x | x | 20.07 | |
| 8 | Marco Fortes | Portugal | x | 19.61 | 19.83 | x | 19.26 | 19.54 | 19.83 | |
