= Michalis Stamatogiannis =

Greek shot putter

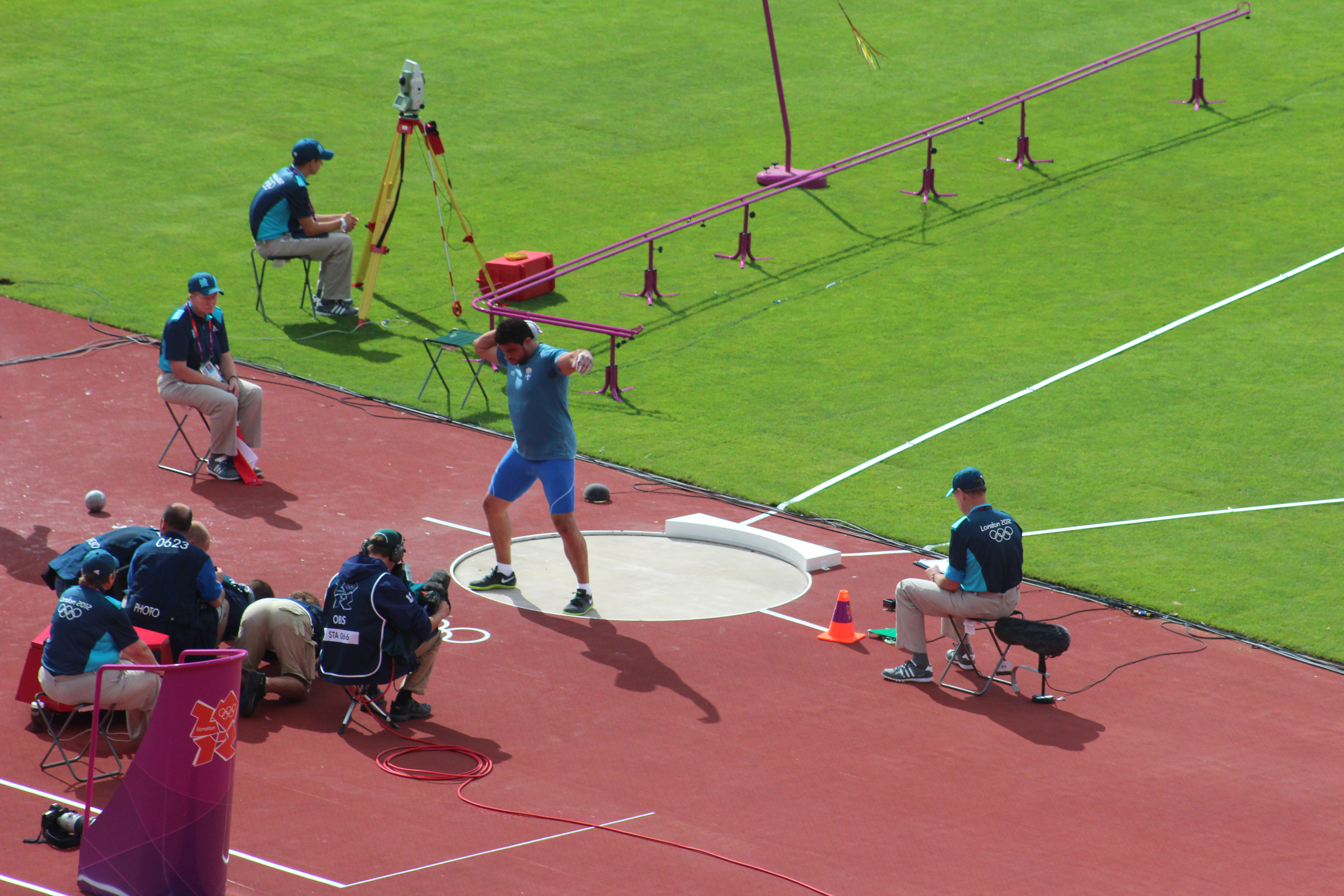
- Michalis Stamatogiannis at the 2012 Summer Olympics in London

Personal information
- Born: 20 May 1982 (age 43)
- Height: 1.88 m (6 ft 2 in)
- Weight: 108 kg (238 lb)

Sport
- Country: Greece
- Sport: Athletics
- Event: Shot put
- Updated on 15 August 2012

Michalis Stamatogiannis (Greek: Μιχάλης Σταματογιάννης; born 20 May 1982 in Athens) is a Greek shot putter.

He finished tenth (in discus throw) at the 1999 World Youth Championships and ninth at the 2000 World Junior Championships. He also competed at the 2008 Olympic Games without reaching the final.

His personal best is 20.17 metres, achieved on 20 July 2011 in Patras. In the indoor track he has set a Greek record of 20.36 metres.

Stamatogiannis was found guilty for doping violation in May 2014 and got 2 years ban until July 2016.

== Doping ==
Stamatogiannis tested positive for the anabolic steroid Stanozolol on 31 May 2014, and was subsequently handed a two-year ban from sport.

== Competition record ==
Year	Competition	Venue	Position	Event	Notes
Representing Greece
1999	World Youth Championships	Bydgoszcz, Poland	23rd (q)	Shot put (5 kg)	17.16 m
1999	World Youth Championships	Bydgoszcz, Poland	10th	Discus throw (1.5 kg)	51.42 m
2000	World Junior Championships	Santiago, Chile	9th	Shot put	18.12 m
2001	European Junior Championships	Grosseto, Italy	7th	Shot put	16.74 m
2003	European U23 Championships	Bydgoszcz, Poland	16th (q)	Shot put	17.42 m
2008	Olympic Games	Beijing, China	36th (q)	Shot put	18.45 m
2009	Mediterranean Games	Pescara, Italy	8th	Shot put	18.22 m
2010	World Indoor Championships	Doha, Qatar	15th (q)	Shot put	19.51 m
2010	European Championships	Barcelona, Spain	18th (q)	Shot put	18.58 m
2012	European Championships	Helsinki, Finland	18th (q)	Shot put	18.95 m
2012	Olympic Games	London, United Kingdom	24th (q)	Shot put	19.24 m
2017	European Indoor Championships	Belgrade, Serbia	22nd (q)	Shot put	18.83 m
