= Andriy Semenov =

Ukrainian shot putter

Personal information
- Born: July 4, 1984 (age 42)
- Height: 2.03 m (6 ft 8 in)
- Weight: 125 kg (276 lb)

Sport
- Country: Ukraine
- Sport: Athletics
- Event: Shot put
- Updated on 15 August 2012

Andriy Semenov (Ukrainian: Андрій Семенов; born 4 July 1984 in Orhei) is a Ukrainian shot putter.

Semenov was born in Moldavian SSR; he does his trainings in Odessa. He finished fourth at the 2001 World Youth Championships. He competed at the 2008 Olympic Games, and with a throw of 20.01 metres he was only 1 centimetre short of a place in the final, among the top twelve. Semenov also competed at the 2012 Olympic Games.

His personal best throw is 20.63 metres, achieved in August 2011 in Donetsk.

In August 2019, Semenov received a 2 year doping ban after a re-testing case from the 2011 World Championships. All of his results from 22 August 2011 to 21 August 2013 were disqualified.

== Competition record ==
| Year | Competition | Venue | Position | Event | Notes |
Representing Ukraine
| 2001 | World Youth Championships | Debrecen, Hungary | 4th | Discus throw (1.5 kg) | 58.38 m |
| 2002 | World Junior Championships | Kingston, Jamaica | 30th (q) | Discus throw (1.75 kg) | 48.38 m |
| 2007 | European Indoor Championships | Birmingham, United Kingdom | 17th (q) | Shot put | 18.41 m |
| 2008 | Olympic Games | Beijing, China | 14th (q) | Shot put | 20.01 m |
| 2010 | European Championships | Barcelona, Spain | 15th (q) | Shot put | 19.31 m |
| 2011 | European Indoor Championships | Paris, France | 10th (q) | Shot put | 19.47 m |
| 2011 | World Championships | Daegu, South Korea | 22nd (q) (DQ) | Shot put | 19.45 m |
| 2012 | Olympic Games | London, United Kingdom | – (DQ) | Shot put | NM |
| 2013 | European Indoor Championships | Gothenburg, Sweden | 14th (q) (DQ) | Shot put | 19.53 m |
