= 2006 IAAF World Indoor Championships – Men's shot put =

The Men's shot put event at the 2006 IAAF World Indoor Championships was held on 10 March 2006.

The winning margin was 95 cm which as of July 2024 remains the only time the men's shot put has been won by more than 90 cm at these championships.

== Medalists ==
Gold	Silver	Bronze
Reese Hoffa; United States	Joachim Olsen; Denmark	Pavel Sofin; Russia

Note: In 2013 it was revealed that Andrei Mikhnevich, the original silver medalist, tested positive for a prohibited substance at the 2005 World Championships. Since this was his second offense, he was given a lifetime ban and all his results from August 2005 on were annulled.

== Results ==
=== Qualification ===
Qualifying perf. 20.30 (Q) or 8 best performers (q) advanced to the Final.

Rank	Athlete	Nationality	#1	#2	#3	Result	Notes
1	Reese Hoffa	United States	20.76			20.76	Q
DQ	Andrei Mikhnevich	Belarus	~~20.35~~			~~20.35~~	Q, Doping
2	Joachim Olsen	Denmark	20.04	X	20.33	20.33	Q
3	Pavel Sofin	Russia	20.23	20.24	X	20.24	q, PB
4	Gheorghe Guset	Romania	X	19.80	20.22	20.22	q
5	Tomasz Majewski	Poland	19.50	X	20.19	20.19	q
6	Manuel Martínez	Spain	19.80	X	20.10	20.10	q
7	Anton Luboslavskiy	Russia	X	19.07	20.04	20.04	q
8	Mikuláš Konopka	Slovakia	19.33	X	19.91	19.91	
9	Christian Cantwell	United States	18.69	X	19.90	19.90	
10	Peter Sack	Germany	18.69	X	19.90	19.79	
11	Ralf Bartels	Germany	X	X	19.46	19.46	
12	Janus Robberts	South Africa	19.39	19.14	19.21	19.39	SB
13	Miran Vodovnik	Slovenia	X	18.84	19.37	19.37	
14	Zhang Qi	China	18.71	18.96	18.21	18.96	
15	Ville Tiisanoja	Finland	18.86	X	X	18.86	
16	Hamza Alić	Bosnia and Herzegovina	18.22	18.24	18.42	18.42	
	Khalid Habash Al-Suwaidi	Qatar	X	X	X	NM	

=== Final ===
Rank	Athlete	Nationality	#1	#2	#3	#4	#5	#6	Result	Notes
1st place, gold medalist(s)	Reese Hoffa	United States	21.41	22.11	X	21.61	X	X	22.11	WL
DQ	Andrei Mikhnevich	Belarus	~~X~~	~~21.25~~	~~X~~	~~21.37~~	~~21.30~~	~~21.19~~	~~21.37~~	Doping
2nd place, silver medalist(s)	Joachim Olsen	Denmark	20.28	21.16	20.62	X	20.80	20.45	21.16	
3rd place, bronze medalist(s)	Pavel Sofin	Russia	20.68	20.27	X	20.03	19.60	20.14	20.68	PB
4	Gheorghe Guset	Romania	20.42	X	X	X	X	20.60	20.60	
5	Manuel Martínez	Spain	19.77	20.43	20.36	X	X	20.39	20.43	SB
6	Tomasz Majewski	Poland	19.80	20.07	X	X	X	X	20.07	
7	Anton Luboslavskiy	Russia	X	19.93	X	X	X	X	19.93	
