= Tomasz Majewski =

Polish shot putter (born 1981)

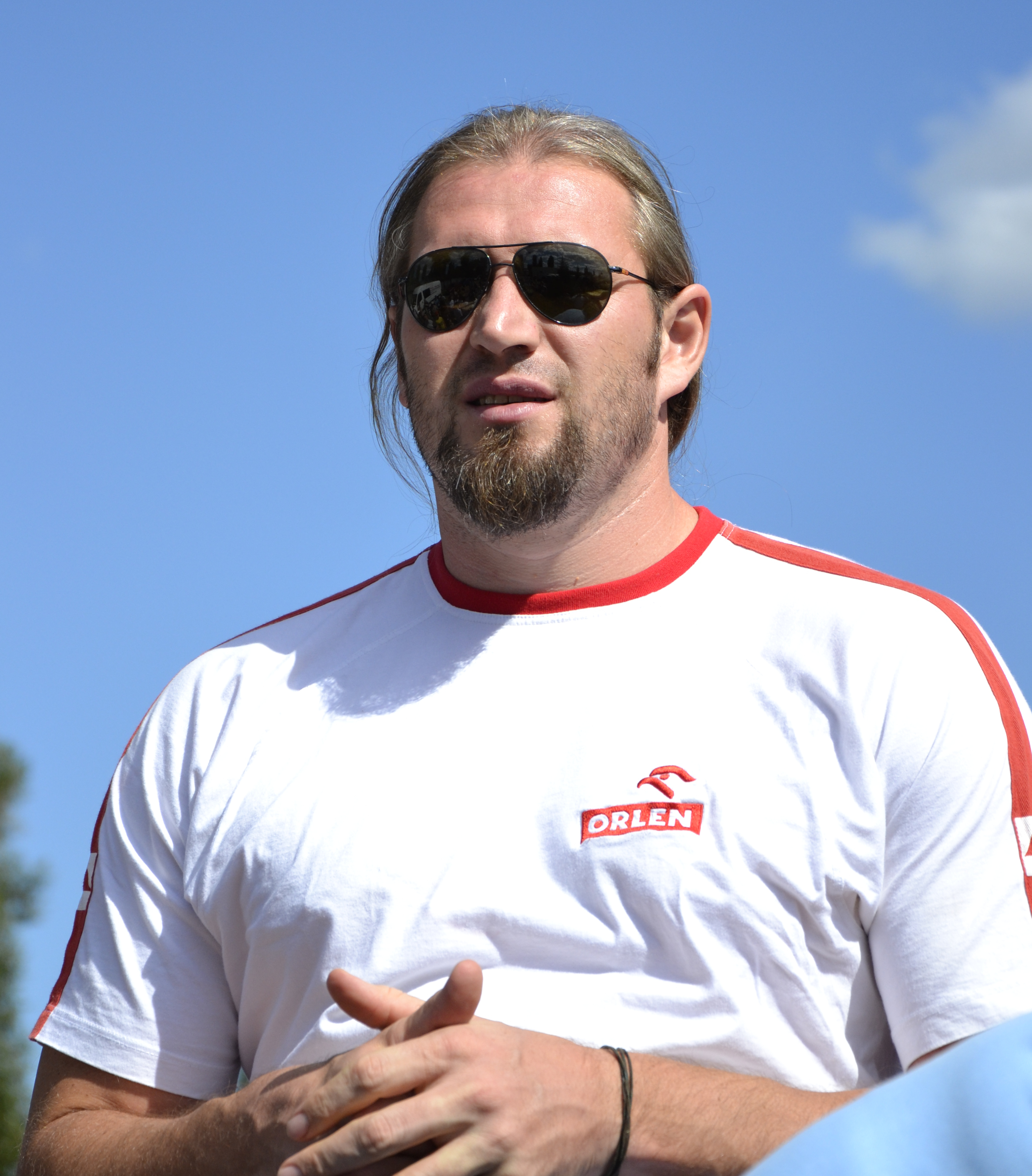
- Majewski in 2013

Personal information
- Nickname: The Silent Giant
- Nationality: Polish
- Born: 30 August 1981 (age 45) Nasielsk, Poland
- Education: Stefan Wyszyński University (Political science)
- Height: 2.04 m (6 ft 8 in)
- Weight: 142 kg (313 lb)
- Website: tomasz-majewski.pl

Sport
- Country: Poland
- Sport: Track and field
- Event: Shot put
- Club: AZS AWF Warszawa
- Turned pro: 1999-
- Coached by: Henryk Olszewski

Achievements and titles
- Olympic finals: Gold in 2008 Gold in 2012
- World finals: Silver in 2009
- Personal bests: 21.95 in outdoor (NR); 21.72 in indoor (NR)
Medal record
Men's athletics
Representing Poland
Event	1st	2nd	3rd
Olympic Games	2	0	0
World Championships	0	1	0
World Indoor Championships	0	0	3
European Championships	1	0	1
European Indoor Championships	1	0	0
Continental Cup	0	0	0
Summer Universiade	1	0	0
Total	5	1	4
Olympic Games
Gold medal – first place	2008 Beijing	Shot put
Gold medal – first place	2012 London	Shot put
World Championships
Silver medal – second place	2009 Berlin	Shot put
World Indoor Championships
Bronze medal – third place	2008 Valencia	Shot put
Bronze medal – third place	2012 Istanbul	Shot put
European Championships
Gold medal – first place	2010 Barcelona	Shot put
Bronze medal – third place	2014 Zürich	Shot put
European Indoor Championships
Gold medal – first place	2009 Torino	Shot put
European Team Championships
Gold medal – first place	2009 Leiria	Shot put
Gold medal – first place	2010 Bergen	Shot put
Silver medal – second place	2011 Stockholm	Shot put
Silver medal – second place	2013 Gateshead	Shot put
Silver medal – second place	2014 Braunschweig	Shot put
Silver medal – second place	2015 Cheboksary	Shot put
European Cup Winter Throwing
Gold medal – first place	2006 Tel Aviv	Shot put
Summer Universiade
Gold medal – first place	2005 Izmir	Shot Put
Jeux de la Francophonie
Gold medal – first place	2013 Nice	Shot put

Tomasz Majewski (born 30 August 1981) is a Polish shot putter and a double Olympic gold medalist (2008 Beijing, 2012 London). He is the third shot putter to successfully defend the Olympic title, first European to do so, and the first since Parry O'Brien in 1956. He also won the silver medal at the 2009 World Athletics Championships and gold medal at the 2010 European Athletics Championships.

== Career ==
Majewski stands at 204 cm (6' 8 1/2") tall and weighs 140 kg (300 lb).

During the Olympic final in Beijing on 15 August 2008, he threw 21.51 meters for the gold medal, Poland's first Olympic medal in shot put since 1972 when the late Władysław Komar took the gold. Majewski was also the first Pole to win gold at the 2008 Olympics.

On 25 July 2009 in Barcelona he threw a personal best of 21.64 m and few days later in DN Galan in Stockholm, Sweden he improved upon this with a throw of 21.95 m, a new Polish record.

At the 2010 IAAF World Indoor Championships he threw a personal best and Polish indoor record of 21.20 m. However, the level of competition was so high that this was only enough for fifth place behind a Canadian record-breaking Dylan Armstrong. It was the first time in championships history that five men had gone beyond the 21 m mark.

In the outdoor season, Majewski competed at the 2010 European Athletics Championships and won the shot put silver medal. His 21-metre throw was beaten by a single centimetre as Andrei Mikhnevich took the title. He had shoulder surgery in the latter half of the year. Focusing on the 2011 season, he said that the strong form of his opponents was more of an inspiration than an obstacle: "Christian Cantwell and Reese Hoffa [both] went over 22 metres last year, the good performances of my rivals doesn't make me angry or worried, instead it acts as the best sort of motivation to get up to their level".

At the 2011 European Team Championships he was the silver medallist behind David Storl and while his young German rival went on to win at the 2011 World Championships in Athletics, Majewski managed only ninth place with a best throw of 20.18 m. At the start of 2012 he broke his own Polish indoor record at the BW-Bank Meeting in Karlsruhe with a winning mark of 21.27 m. In London 2012 he won the gold medal with a mark of 21.89 m and he became the first male shot-put thrower to defend his Olympic title since Parry O'Brien achieved that in Melbourne 1956.

== Hobbies ==
His hobbies include basketball and playing video games.

== National honours ==
For his sport achievements, he received:
Knight's Cross of the Order of Polonia Restituta (5th Class) in 2008.
Officer's Cross of the Order of Polonia Restituta (4th Class) in 2009.

== Personal bests ==
- Outdoor – 21.95 m (2009)
- Indoor – 21.72 m (2012)

His best attempt was in Sweden DN Galan (21.65 m, 21.95 m, 21.44 m, x, x, 21.83 m).

== Achievements ==
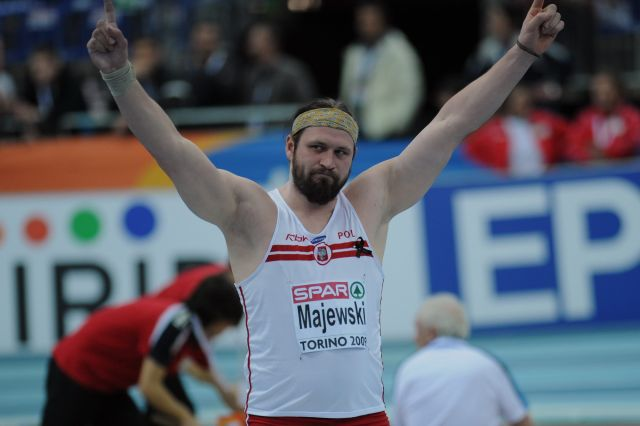
Majewski took gold in Turin in 2009

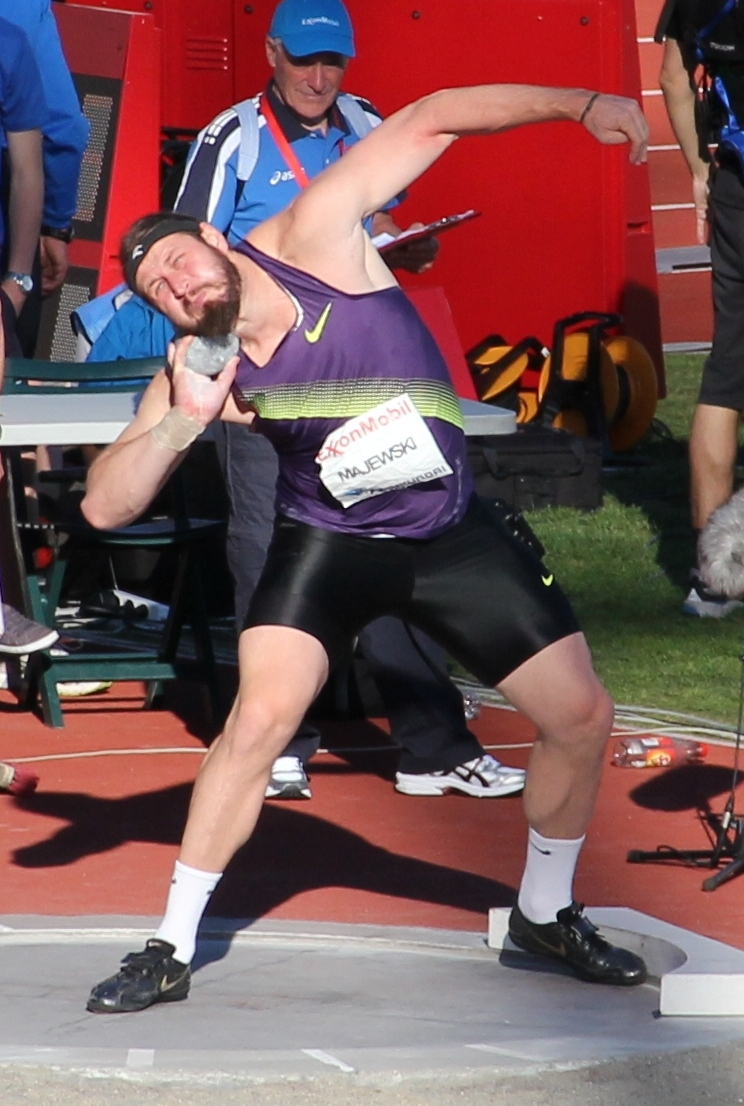
Putting at the 2010 Bislett Games

Year	Competition	Venue	Position	Notes
Representing Poland
2003	European U23 Championships	Bydgoszcz, Poland	4th	19.92 m
2003	Universiade	Daegu, South Korea	5th	19.90 m
2004	World Indoor Championships	Budapest, Hungary	4th	20.83 m
2004	Olympic Games	Athens, Greece	18th (q)	19.55 m
2005	European Indoor Championships	Madrid, Spain	10th (q)	19.57 m
2005	World Championships	Helsinki, Finland	7th	20.23 m
2005	Universiade	İzmir, Turkey	1st	20.60 m
2006	World Indoor Championships	Moscow, Russia	6th	20.07 m
2006	European Championships	Gothenburg, Sweden	6th	19.85 m
2006	World Athletics Final	Stuttgart, Germany	7th	20.13 m
2007	World Championships	Osaka, Japan	4th	20.87 m
2008	World Indoor Championships	Valencia, Spain	3rd	20.93 m
2008	Olympic Games	Beijing, China	1st	21.51 m
2008	World Athletics Final	Stuttgart, Germany	1st	20.88 m
2009	European Indoor Championships	Turin, Italy	1st	21.02 m
2009	European Team Championships	Leiria, Portugal	1st	20.81 m
2009	World Championships	Berlin, Germany	2nd	21.91 m
2009	World Athletics Final	Thessaloniki, Greece	2nd	21.21 m
2010	World Indoor Championships	Doha, Qatar	4th	21.20 m (iNR)
2010	European Championships	Barcelona, Spain	1st	21.00 m
2011	World Championships	Daegu, South Korea	8th	20.18 m
2012	World Indoor Championships	Istanbul, Turkey	3rd	21.72 m (iNR)
2012	Olympic Games	London, United Kingdom	1st	21.89 m
2013	World Championships	Moscow, Russia	6th	20.98 m
2013	Jeux de la Francophonie	Nice, France	1st	20.18 m
2014	World Indoor Championships	Sopot, Poland	4th	21.04 m
2014	European Championships	Zürich, Switzerland	3rd	20.83 m
2015	World Championships	Beijing, China	6th	20.82 m
2016	Olympic Games	Rio de Janeiro, Brazil	6th	20.72 m
