= Ralf Bartels =

German shot putter (born 1978)

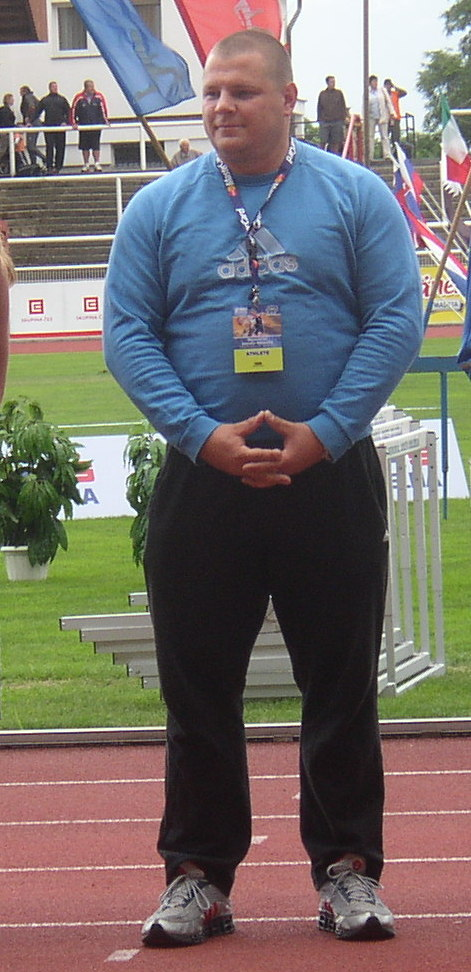
- Bartels at the 2008 Odložil Memorial in Prague

Personal information
- Born: 21 February 1978 (age 48)
- Height: 1.87 m (6 ft 1 1/2 in)
- Weight: 143 kg (315 lb)

Sport
- Country: Germany
- Sport: Athletics
- Event: Shot put
Medal record
Men's athletics
Representing Germany
World Championships
Bronze medal – third place	2005 Helsinki	Shot put
Bronze medal – third place	2009 Berlin	Shot put
European Championships
Gold medal – first place	2006 Göteborg	Shot put
Silver medal – second place	2010 Barcelona	Shot put
Bronze medal – third place	2002 München	Shot put
World Indoor Championships
Silver medal – second place	2010 Doha	Shot put
European Indoor Championships
Gold medal – first place	2011 Paris	Shot put
Bronze medal – third place	2009 Torino	Shot put
- Updated on 15 August 2012

Ralf Bartels (born 21 February 1978 in Stavenhagen, Germany, then German Democratic Republic) is a German shot putter. He became European Champion at the 2006 European Championships in Athletics in Gothenburg, Sweden after beating Belarusian Andrei Mikhnevich with a final put of 21.13 metres, two centimetres ahead of the Belarusian.

Bartels also won bronze at the 2005 World Championships in Athletics in Helsinki, with a put of 20.99 m. He had previously been a bronze medalist at the 2002 European Athletics Championships.

== Competition record ==
Year	Competition	Venue	Position	Notes
Representing Germany
1996	World Junior Championships	Sydney, Australia	1st	18.71 m
1997	European Junior Championships	Ljubljana, Slovenia	1st	18.30 m
1999	European U23 Championships	Gothenburg, Sweden	6th	18.53 m
2001	World Championships	Edmonton, Canada	17th (q)	19.41 m
2002	European Indoor Championships	Vienna, Austria	8th (q)	19.60 m
2002	European Championships	Munich, Germany	3rd	20.58 m
2003	World Indoor Championships	Birmingham, United Kingdom	12th (q)	19.32 m
2003	World Championships	Paris, France	5th	20.50 m
2004	World Indoor Championships	Budapest, Hungary	11th (q)	19.93 m
2004	Olympic Games	Athens, Greece	7th	20.26 m
2005	World Championships	Helsinki, Finland	3rd	20.99 m
2006	World Indoor Championships	Moscow, Russia	11th (q)	19.46 m
2006	European Championships	Gothenburg, Sweden	1st	21.13 m
2007	World Championships	Osaka, Japan	6th	20.45 m
2009	European Indoor Championships	Turin, Italy	3rd	20.39 m
2009	World Championships	Berlin, Germany	3rd	21.37 m
2010	World Indoor Championships	Doha, Qatar	2nd	21.44 m
2010	European Championships	Barcelona, Spain	2nd	20.93 m
2011	European Indoor Championships	Paris, France	1st	21.16 m
2011	World Championships	Daegu, South Korea	9th	20.14 m
2012	Olympic Games	London, United Kingdom	16th (q)	20.00 m
2013	European Indoor Championships	Gothenburg, Sweden	4th	20.16 m
