= Ivan Yushkov =

Russian shot putter

Ivan Yushkov (born 15 January 1981) is a Russian shot putter. His personal best throw is 21.01 metres, achieved in May 2008 in Sochi.

In 2016, he was disqualified from the Beijing 2008 Olympics following reanalysis of his samples from the 2008 Olympics, resulted in a positive test for the prohibited substances turinabol, oxandrolone and stanozolol. In February 2019, the Court of Arbitration for Sport handed him a four-year ban for doping, starting from 2 July 2016.

== International competitions ==
Year	Competition	Venue	Position	Notes
Representing Russia
2000	World Junior Championships	Santiago, Chile	2nd	19.06 m
2001	European U23 Championships	Amsterdam, Netherlands	5th	18.96 m
2002	European Indoor Championships	Vienna, Austria	19th (q)	18.83 m
2003	European U23 Championships	Bydgoszcz, Poland	5th	19.76 m
2004	World Indoor Championships	Budapest, Hungary	16th (q)	19.55 m
2004	Olympic Games	Athens, Greece	15th (q)	19.67 m
2005	European Indoor Championships	Madrid, Spain	7th	19.69 m
2005	World Championships	Helsinki, Finland	21st (q)	18.98 m
2005	Universiade	İzmir, Turkey	4th	19.38 m
2008	Olympic Games	Beijing, China	DSQ	19.67 m
2011	European Indoor Championships	Paris, France	6th	20.19 m
2012	World Indoor Championships	Istanbul, Turkey	8th	20.10 m

== See also ==
- List of doping cases in athletics
