= 2004 IAAF World Indoor Championships – Men's shot put =

The Men's shot put event at the 2004 IAAF World Indoor Championships was held on March 6–7.

== Medalists ==
Gold	Silver	Bronze
Christian Cantwell; United States	Reese Hoffa; United States	Joachim Olsen; Denmark

== Results ==
=== Qualification ===
Qualifying performance 20.50 (Q) or 8 best performers (q) advanced to the final.

Rank	Group	Athlete	Nationality	#1	#2	#3	Result	Notes
1	A	Yuriy Bilonoh	Ukraine	20.79			20.79	Q, SB
2	A	Christian Cantwell	United States	X	20.41	20.77	20.77	Q
3	B	Manuel Martínez	Spain	20.59			20.59	Q
4	A	Carl Myerscough	Great Britain	19.20	19.74	20.41	20.41	q
5	A	Andrei Mikhnevich	Belarus	19.69	20.41	X	20.41	q
6	B	Reese Hoffa	United States	19.70	20.28	20.13	20.28	q
7	A	Tomasz Majewski	Poland	20.28	X	20.04	20.28	q, PB
8	B	Joachim Olsen	Denmark	19.90	20.28	X	20.28	q
9	B	Zsolt Bíber	Hungary	19.92	20.24	20.19	20.24	
10	B	Ville Tiisanoja	Finland	20.13	20.09	20.21	20.21	
11	A	Ralf Bartels	Germany	X	19.62	19.93	19.93	
12	B	Miran Vodovnik	Slovenia	19.40	X	19.83	19.83	
13	B	Khalid Habash Al-Suwaidi	Qatar	19.25	19.82	X	19.82	
14	A	Rutger Smith	Netherlands	X	X	19.67	19.67	
15	A	Marco Antonio Verni	Chile	19.61	X	X	19.61	SB
16	A	Ivan Yushkov	Russia	18.78	19.34	19.55	19.55	
17	B	Janus Robberts	South Africa	19.41	X	X	19.41	
18	B	Pavel Sofin	Russia	19.02	X	X	19.02	
19	B	Dzimitry Hancharuk	Belarus	18.24	X	X	18.24	
20	A	Ivan Emilianov	Moldova	X	17.47	17.29	17.47	SB
	A	Alexis Paumier	Cuba	X	X	X	NM	
	B	Gheorghe Guset	Romania	X	X	X	NM	

=== Final ===
Rank	Athlete	Nationality	#1	#2	#3	#4	#5	#6	Result	Notes
1st place, gold medalist(s)	Christian Cantwell	United States	20.96	21.49	20.81	20.62	X	–	21.49	
2nd place, silver medalist(s)	Reese Hoffa	United States	21.07	X	20.36	20.52	20.82	X	21.07	PB
3rd place, bronze medalist(s)	Joachim Olsen	Denmark	20.27	20.95	20.33	20.99	20.72	20.39	20.99	
4	Tomasz Majewski	Poland	19.92	X	X	19.98	20.83	X	20.83	NR
5	Manuel Martínez	Spain	X	20.79	20.60	X	X	20.33	20.79	SB
6	Andrei Mikhnevich	Belarus	20.22	20.50	20.27	20.27	19.97	20.23	20.50	
7	Carl Myerscough	Great Britain	19.69	X	19.76	19.90	X	20.47	20.47	
8	Yuriy Bilonoh	Ukraine	X	20.26	X	X	20.02	X	20.26	
