= Kim Christensen (shot putter) =

Danish shot putter

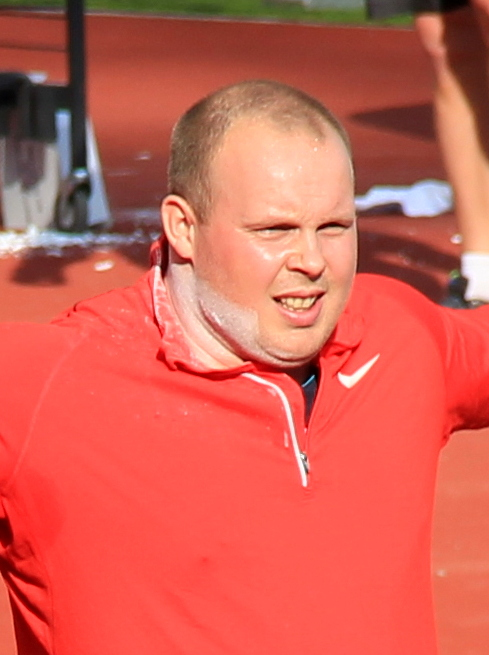

Personal information
- Born: April 1, 1984 (age 41) Mariager, Denmark
- Height: 1.86 m (6 ft 1 in)
- Weight: 125 kg (276 lb)

Sport
- Country: Denmark
- Sport: Athletics
- Event: Shot put
- Club: Sparta AM
- Updated on 15 August 2012

Kim Juhl Christensen (born 1 April 1984 in Mariager) is a Danish athlete. He represented Denmark in shot put at the 2012 Summer Olympics.

== Competition record ==
| Year | Competition | Venue | Position | Notes |
Representing Denmark
| 2005 | European U23 Championships | Erfurt, Germany | 17th (q) | 15.64 m |
| 2007 | European Indoor Championships | Birmingham, United Kingdom | 19th (q) | 17.36 m |
| 2008 | World Indoor Championships | Valencia, Spain | 17th (q) | 18.26 m |
| 2009 | European Indoor Championships | Turin, Italy | 10th (q) | 19.55 m |
| 2010 | European Championships | Barcelona, Spain | 22nd (q) | 18.20 m |
| 2011 | European Indoor Championships | Paris, France | 15th (q) | 19.16 m |
| 2011 | World Championships | Daegu, South Korea | 16th (q) | 19.74 m |
| 2012 | World Indoor Championships | Istanbul, Turkey | 19th (q) | 18.87 m |
| 2012 | European Championships | Helsinki, Finland | 12th | 19.00 m |
| 2012 | Olympic Games | London, United Kingdom | 27th (q) | 19.13 m |
