= Yury Bialou =

Belarusian shot putter

Yury Bialou (Belarusian: Юрый Уладзіміравіч Бялоў; born March 20, 1981, in Krychaw, Belarusian SSR) is a male shot putter from Belarus. His personal best throw is 21.14 metres, achieved in May 2003 in Minsk.

== Achievements ==
| Year | Competition | Venue | Position | Notes |
Representing Belarus
| 2000 | World Junior Championships | Santiago, Chile | 6th | 18.83 m |
| 2001 | European U23 Championships | Amsterdam, Netherlands | 2nd | 19.38 m |
| 2002 | European Championships | Munich, Germany | 15th | 19.43 m |
| 2003 | European U23 Championships | Bydgoszcz, Poland | 7th | 19.09 m |
| 2004 | Olympic Games | Olympia, Greece | 6th | 20.34 m |
| 2005 | Universiade | İzmir, Turkey | 6th | 19.24 m |
| 2007 | World Championships | Osaka, Japan | 8th | 20.34 m |
| 2008 | Olympic Games | Beijing, China | 9th | 20.06 m |
| 2009 | World Championships | Berlin, Germany | 21st | 19.75 m |
