= Robert Häggblom =

Finnish shot putter (born 1982)

Robert Markus Häggblom (born 9 August 1982 in Vaasa) is a Finnish shot putter.

He won the gold medal at the 1999 World Youth Championships and finished fourth at the 2007 European Indoor Championships. He also competed at the 2007 World Championships, the 2008 World Indoor Championships and the 2008 Olympic Games without reaching the final.

Häggblom was the nineteenth member to be inducted into the 20 meter club after he putted the shot 20.13 metres in May 2006 in Halle, Germany. His personal best throw is 20.53 metres, achieved in July 2007 in Lapua.

He represents the sports club Vasa Idrottssällskap, and is coached by his father Magnus Häggblom.

== Achievements ==
Year	Competition	Venue	Position	Notes
Representing Finland
2003	European U23 Championships	Bydgoszcz, Poland	14th (q)	17.65 m
2008	Finnish Championships	Tampere, Finland	1st	18.88 m
