= Nedžad Mulabegović =

Croatian shot putter

Personal information
- Nationality: Croatian
- Born: February 4, 1981 (age 45) Derventa, SR Bosnia and Herzegovina, SFR Yugoslavia
- Height: 1.90 m (6 ft 3 in)
- Weight: 122 kg (269 lb)

Sport
- Sport: Athletics
- Event: Shot put
Medal record
Men's athletics
Representing Croatia
Mediterranean Games
| Bronze medal – third place | Pescara 2009 | Shot Put |
- Updated on 15 August 2012

Nedžad Mulabegović (born 4 February 1981) is a Croatian shot putter of Bosniak origin. His personal best throw is 20.67 metres, achieved in July 2014 in Varaždin, Croatia.

He finished twelfth at the 2000 World Junior Championships and won the bronze medal at the 2003 Summer Universiade. He also competed at the 2004 Olympic Games, the 2006 European Championships, the 2007 World Championships, the 2008 Olympic Games, 2009 World Championship in Berlin and the 2012 Olympic Games, without reaching the finals. He attended Purdue University.

== Competition record ==
| Year | Competition | Venue | Position | Event | Notes |
Representing Croatia
| 1999 | European Junior Championships | Riga, Latvia | 10th | Shot put | 16.11 m |
| 2000 | World Junior Championships | Santiago, Chile | 12th | Shot put | 17.23 m |
| 2000 | World Junior Championships | Santiago, Chile | 25th (q) | Discus throw | 47.48 m |
| 2001 | European U23 Championships | Amsterdam, Netherlands | 11th | Shot put | 17.66 m |
| 2003 | Universiade | Daegu, South Korea | 3rd | Shot put | 19.99 m |
| 2004 | Olympic Games | Athens, Greece | 28th (q) | Shot put | 19.07 m |
| 2006 | European Championships | Gothenburg, Sweden | 13th (q) | Shot put | 19.48 m |
| 2008 | Olympic Games | Beijing, China | 29th (q) | Shot put | 19.35 m |
| 2009 | World Championships | Berlin, Germany | 28th (q) | Shot put | 19.15 m |
| 2010 | European Championships | Barcelona, Spain | 5th | Shot put | 20.56 m |
| 2011 | European Indoor Championships | Paris, France | 4th | Shot put | 20.43 m |
| 2012 | Olympic Games | London, United Kingdom | 17th (q) | Shot put | 19.86 m |
| 2013 | European Indoor Championships | Gothenburg, Sweden | 16th (q) | Shot put | 19.42 m |
| 2016 | European Championships | Amsterdam, Netherlands | 15th (q) | Shot put | 19.55 m |
