= Pavel Lyzhyn =

Belarusian shot putter (born 1981)

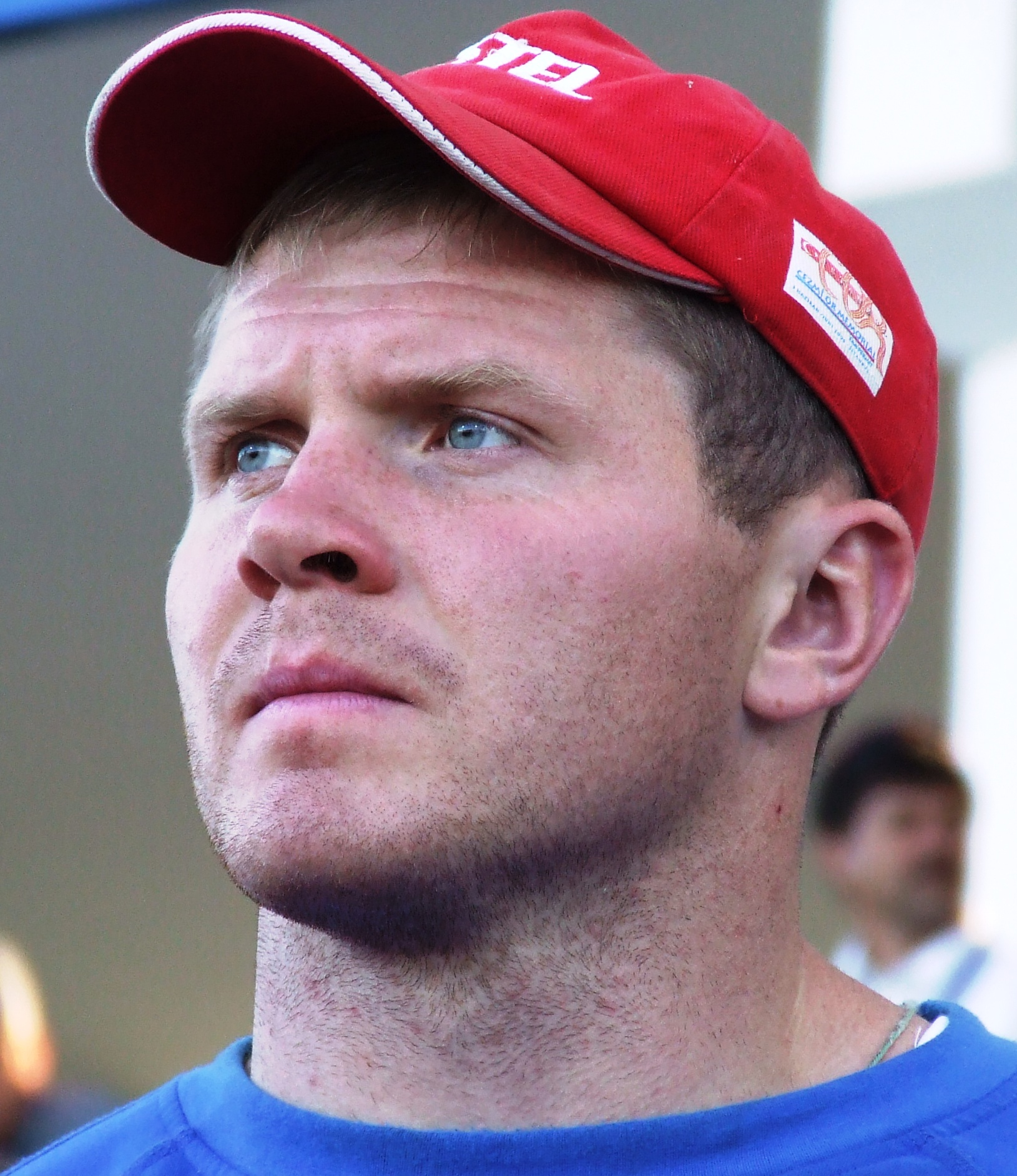

Personal information
- Nationality: Belarusian
- Born: 24 March 1981 (age 45) Vysokaye, Belarus
- Height: 1.89 m (6 ft 2 1/2 in)
- Weight: 110 kg (243 lb)

Sport
- Sport: Track and field
- Events: Shot put, Discus throw

Achievements and titles
- Personal best: 21.21 m
Medal record
World Student Games
Silver medal – second place	2003 Daegu	Shot put
European Indoor Championships
Silver medal – second place	2007 Birmingham	Shot put

Pavel Kanstantsinavich Lyzhyn (Belarusian: Павел Канстанцінавіч Лыжын, Pavieł Łyžyn, born 24 March 1981 in Vysokaye) is a Belarusian shot putter. His personal best throw is 21.21 metres from 2010. He threw a personal best throw of 20.98 metres at the 2008 Olympics in Beijing which originally translated into a fourth place, just 5 cm short of the bronze medal winner and 11 cm short of the silver. However, on 25 November 2016 the IOC disqualified him from the 2008 Olympic Games and struck his results from the record for failing a drugs test in a re-analysis of his doping sample from 2008.

He competed at the 2012 Summer Olympics, finishing in 8th, with a throw of 20.69 m.

Lyzhyn also throws the discus, and has a personal best throw of 61.72 metres

== Achievements ==
Year	Competition	Venue	Position	Event	Notes
Representing Belarus
2000	World Junior Championships	Santiago, Chile	4th	Shot put	19.00 m
2000	World Junior Championships	Santiago, Chile	7th	Discus	56.24 m
2001	European U23 Championships	Amsterdam, Netherlands	8th	Shot put	18.59 m
2002	European Indoor Championships	Vienna, Austria	6th	Shot put	19.79 m
2003	European U23 Championships	Bydgoszcz, Poland	1st	Shot put	20.43 m
2003	Universiade	Daegu, South Korea	2nd	Shot put	20.72 m
2005	Universiade	İzmir, Turkey	5th	Shot put	19.28 m
2006	European Championships	Gothenburg, Sweden	10th	Shot put	19.51 m
2007	European Indoor Championships	Birmingham, England	2nd	Shot put	20.82 PBi
2008	Olympic Games	Beijing, China	DSQ	Shot put	for doping
2009	World Championships	Berlin, Germany	DSQ	Shot put	20.98
2010	European Championships	Barcelona, Spain	DSQ	Shot put	20.11 m
2012	Olympic Games	London, Great Britain	8th	Shot put	20.69
