= Taavi Peetre =

Estonian shot putter and discus thrower

Personal information
- Nationality: Estonian
- Born: 5 July 1983 Käina Parish, then part of Estonian SSR, Soviet Union
- Died: 11 September 2010 (aged 27) Lake Tamula, Estonia
- Height: 1.92 m (6 ft 4 in)
- Weight: 112 kg (247 lb)

Achievements and titles
- Olympic finals: 2008
- Personal bests: Shot put: 20.33 m Discus: 60.84 m
Medal record
Men's athletics
Representing Estonia
European Athletics U23 Championships
Silver medal – second place	2005 Erfurt	Shot put
Summer Universiade
Silver medal – second place	2005 Izmir	Shot put

Taavi Peetre (5 July 1983 – 11 September 2010) was an Estonian shot putter and discus thrower. He represented his country at two Olympic Games (in 2004 and 2008) and also took part in the World Championships in Athletics on two occasions. His personal best shot put mark of 20.33 m was then the second best after an Estonian record holder Heino Sild. His personal best in discus throw was 60.84 m, achieved in April 2010 in Denton, Texas, United States. He died in 2010 after a boat accident.

== Career ==
Born in Käina Parish, his first major international competition was the 1999 World Youth Championships in Athletics, where he was tenth in the discus throw qualifiers of the competition's inaugural edition. Peetre finished ninth in the shot put final at the 2002 World Junior Championships, having already thrown a national junior record of 17.71 m earlier that year, and also competed in the qualifiers of the discus contest. He improved his best shot put mark to 19.02 m the following year and made his first Olympic appearance at the 2004 Olympic Games.

Having changed his focus to primarily the shot put, the 2005 season marked a further breakthrough into the senior ranks. He represented Estonia at the 2005 European Athletics Indoor Championships and then at the 2005 World Championships later in the season, but did not get past the qualifiers on either occasion. He enjoyed success at lower level competitions, however, winning shot put silver medals at the 2005 European Athletics U23 Championships, 2005 Universiade, and in the A League of the 2005 European Cup.

He improved his indoor shot put best in February 2006, throwing 19.81 m, and was eleventh at the European Cup Winter Throwing. He retained his runner-up place in the A League section of the 2006 European Cup, but managed only eleventh in the qualifiers of his first continental outdoor championships, the 2006 European Athletics Championships. A low-key 2007 was highlighted by a win at the national championships and eighteenth in the qualifiers at the 2007 European Athletics Indoor Championships.

He returned to top form in 2008, throwing over sixty metres in the discus for the first time and putting a season's best of 20.22 m in the shot just prior to the 2008 Beijing Olympics. At his second Olympic shot put competition he had a best mark of 19.57 m but failed to reach the final round. In 2009 he regained the national shot put title and gave his best performance at a global event at the 2009 World Championships in Athletics: his mark of 19.91 m was the fifth best of his qualification group, but this was not enough to progress to the final. He achieved a personal best in the shot put of 20.33 m in July 2010 in Viljandi, Estonia. His last major international championships was the 2010 European Athletics Championships, where he threw 19.42 m for seventh place in the qualifying round.

On 11 September 2010, Peetre drowned in Lake Tamula during a fishing trip with friends.

== Major competitions ==
Year	Competition	Venue	Position	Event	Result
Representing Estonia
2001	European Junior Championships	Grosseto, Italy	15th (q)	Shot put	15.72 m
2002	World Junior Championships	Kingston, Jamaica	9th	Shot put (6 kg)	18.72 m
2002	World Junior Championships	Kingston, Jamaica	18th (q)	Discus (1.75 kg)	53.90 m
2003	European U23 Championships	Bydgoszcz, Poland	–	Shot put	NM
2003	Universiade	Daegu, South Korea	6th	Shot put	18.73 m
2004	Olympic Games	Athens, Greece	26th (q)	Shot put	19.14 m
2005	European U23 Championships	Erfurt, Germany	2nd	Shot put	19.85 m
2005	World Championships	Helsinki, Finland	19th (q)	Shot put	19.20 m
2005	Universiade	İzmir, Turkey	2nd	Shot put	20.02 m
2006	European Championships	Gothenburg, Sweden	21st (q)	Shot put	18.67 m
2008	Olympic Games	Beijing, China	26th (q)	Shot put	19.57 m
2009	World Championships	Berlin, Germany	14th (q)	Shot put	19.91 m
2010	European Championships	Barcelona, Spain	13th (q)	Shot put	19.42 m
