= Scott Martin (thrower) =

Australian shot putter and discus thrower

Personal information
- Born: 12 October 1982 (age 43) Wodonga, Victoria
- Height: 1.9 m (6 ft 3 in)
- Weight: 135 kg (298 lb)

Sport
- Country: Australia
- Sport: Athletics
- Event(s): Discus, Hammer throw, Shot Put
Medal record
Men's athletics
Representing Australia
Commonwealth Games
Gold medal – first place	2006 Melbourne	Discus
Bronze medal – third place	2006 Melbourne	Shot put
Oceania Championships
Gold medal – first place	2010 Cairns	Shot put
- Updated on 28 June 2022

Scott Martin (born 12 October 1982 in Wodonga, Victoria) is an Australian shot putter and discus throw competitor. He rose to prominence in a National Australia Bank advertisement promoting the 2006 Commonwealth Games; in the ad, Martin was shown taking part in a ballet class to improve his discus technique. He won a bronze medal in the men's shot put at the Games, and won gold in the men's discus throw.

Martin is a three-time discus champion (2004–06). He is currently managed by the Australian arm of Athletes1, whose Director is Rick Olarenshaw.

In 2008, Martin was temporarily the Australia and Oceania shot put record holder following his performance at the Melbourne Telstra A Series. He competed at the 2008 Beijing Olympics in the shot put and 2012 London Olympics at the discus but failed to progress beyond the qualifying stage on both occasions.

== Achievements ==
Year	Competition	Venue	Position	Event	Notes
Representing Australia
1999	World Youth Championships	Bydgoszcz, Poland	6th	Shot put (5 kg)	18.71 m
2000	World Junior Championships	Santiago, Chile	11th	Shot put	17.60 m
2000	World Junior Championships	Santiago, Chile	15th (q)	Discus	50.56 m
2006	Commonwealth Games	Melbourne, Australia	3rd	Shot put	19.48 m
2006	Commonwealth Games	Melbourne, Australia	1st	Discus throw	63.48 m
2006	World Athletics Final	Stuttgart, Germany	5th	Shot put	20.38 m
2006	World Cup	Athens, Greece	4th	Shot put	20.25 m
2006	World Cup	Athens, Greece	5th	Discus throw	60.93 m
2008	Melbourne Telstra A Series	Melbourne, Australia	1st	Shot put	21.26 m
2008	World Indoor Championships	Valencia, Spain	6th	Shot put	20.13 m
2008	Olympic Games	Beijing, China	21st	Shot put	19.75 m
2009	World Championships	Berlin, Germany	25th	Shot put	19.52 m
2010	Oceania Championships	Cairns, Australia	1st	Shot put	19.55 m
2012	Olympic Games	London, United Kingdom	19th (q)	Discus throw	62.14 m
