= Mika Vasara =

Finnish shot putter

Mika Tapani Vasara (born 22 October 1983 in Pieksämäki, Finland) is a male shot putter from Finland.

Vasara won his first medal in the Finnish Championships in 2006 when he won the bronze in the indoors championships and silver in the outdoors. On 4 June 2006, in Leppävirta, Finland, Vasara put the shot over the 20-m line for the first time in his career, making him the 20th member of the 20 meter club. Vasara also competed in the 2006 European Championships in Athletics, but did not make the final.

Vasara's current record is 20.21, which he hoped to surpass at his first adult World Championships at Osaka. His result was 19.55 when 19.92 was needed to qualify for the final.

Vasara puts for Pieksämäen Veikot and is coached by his father, Markku Vasara. Mika Vasara himself has a family of four.

In addition with athletics, Vasara is studying for Bachelor of Business Administration at Savonia University of Applied Sciences.
