= Athletics at the 2012 Summer Olympics – Men's shot put =

Men's shot put at the Games of the XXX Olympiad
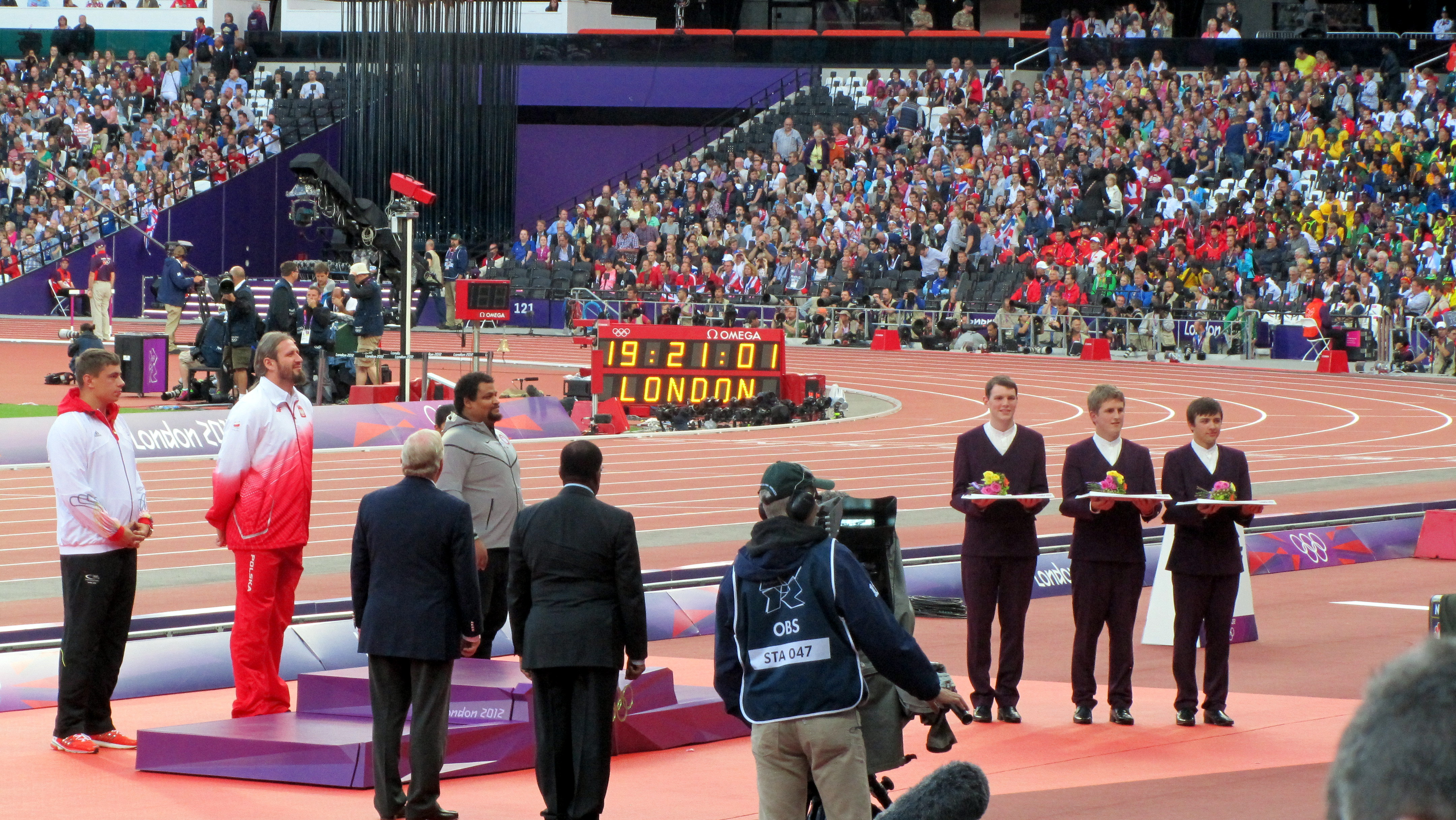
- Men's shot put victory ceremony
- Venue: Olympic Stadium
- Date: 3 August
- Competitors: 40 from 34 nations
- Winning distance: 21.89

Medalists
1st place, gold medalist(s)		Tomasz Majewski	Poland
2nd place, silver medalist(s)		David Storl	Germany
3rd place, bronze medalist(s)		Reese Hoffa	United States

Official Video Highlights

The men's shot put competition at the 2012 Summer Olympics in London, United Kingdom was held at the Olympic Stadium on 3 August. Forty athletes from 34 nations competed. The event was won by Tomasz Majewski of Poland, the nation's second consecutive and third overall victory in the men's shot put. Majewski was the third man to successfully defend Olympic shot put gold (after Ralph Rose and Parry O'Brien), both of whom added a silver medal after their two golds). David Storl of Germany took silver, the first medal for united Germany since 1936 (though East Germany had won multiple medals). Reese Hoffa took bronze to keep the American podium streak going at eight consecutive Games.

== Summary ==
In the qualification rounds, the first athletics event of the Olympics, the athletes with the best credentials coming in; (2007 World Champion) Reese Hoffa, (2011 World Champion) David Storl and (defending champion) Tomasz Majewski placed themselves in the favorite role, by tossing an automatic qualifier on their first attempt. Ryan Whiting and German Lauro had to take all three attempts to make their automatic qualifier, Lauro's becoming the new National Record for Argentina. It took 20.25 to make it to the finals, held in the evening.

The results of the first preliminary round foretold the final results. Those three athletes led from the first round, with Storl literally flexing his muscles in the ring as he took the early lead, then improving his position slightly in the second round. Lauro added 7 cm to the national record he had set in the morning in the second round and another 2 cm in the third, but in the end that was only good enough for sixth place. Majewski edged into the lead with his third attempt, while Hoffa made his best attempt in the fourth round. (2009 World Champion) Christian Cantwell came within 4 cm of grabbing the bronze medal from his American teammate in the final round, then Majewski put a cap on his victory with the best throw in the competition 21.89 on the final throw. Majewski is the first to repeat as champion since Parry O'Brien in 1956, with Ralph Rose from 1908 the only other, and the first non-American to do that.

== Background ==
This was the 27th appearance of the event, which is one of 12 athletics events to have been held at every Summer Olympics. The top five finishers from 2008 returned: Tomasz Majewski of Poland, Christian Cantwell of the United States, Andrei Mikhnevich of Belarus (whose bronze medal would later be stripped and reassigned to Armstrong), Dylan Armstrong of Canada, and Pavel Lyzhyn of Belarus (also later disqualified), along with original seventh-place finisher Reese Hoffa of the United States and original ninth-place finisher Rutger Smith of the Netherlands. Since then, Cantwell had won the 2009 world championships and David Storl of Germany had won the 2011 worlds. Majewski and Armstrong had taken silver at those events. Those four men, along with the other Americans (Hoffa and Ryan Whiting, the 2012 indoor world champion) were the favored contenders.

Albania made its debut in the men's shot put. The United States made its 26th appearance, most of any nation, having missed only the boycotted 1980 Games.

== Qualification ==
A National Olympic Committee (NOC) could enter up to 3 qualified athletes in the men's shot put event if all athletes met the A standard, or 1 athlete if they met the B standard. The maximum number of athletes per nation had been set at 3 since the 1930 Olympic Congress. The qualifying distance standards could be obtained in various meets during the qualifying period that had the approval of the IAAF. Both outdoor and indoor meets were eligible. The A standard for the 2012 men's shot put was 20.50 metres; the B standard was 20.00 metres. The qualifying period for was from 1 May 2011 to 8 July 2012. NOCs could also have an athlete enter the shot put through a universality place. NOCs could enter one male athlete in an athletics event, regardless of time, if they had no male athletes meeting the qualifying A or B standards in any men's athletic event.

== Competition format ==
Each athlete received three throws in the qualifying round. All who achieved the qualifying distance of 20.65 metres progressed to the final. If fewer than twelve athletes achieved this mark, then the twelve furthest throwing athletes reached the final. Each finalist was allowed three throws in last round, with the top eight athletes after that point being given three further attempts.

== Records ==
Prior to the competition, the existing world and Olympic records were as follows.

World record	Randy Barnes (USA)	23.12	Westwood, United States	20 May 1990
Olympic record	Ulf Timmermann (GDR)	22.47	Seoul, South Korea	23 September 1988

No new world or Olympic records were set during the competition. The following national record were set during this competition.

Nation	Athlete	Round	Distance
Argentina National Record	Germán Lauro	Qualifying	20.75
Argentina National Record	Germán Lauro	Final	20.82
Argentina National Record	Germán Lauro	Final	20.84

== Schedule ==
All times are British Summer Time (UTC+1)

Date	Time	Round
Friday, 3 August 2012	10:00; 20:30	Qualifying; Final

== Results ==
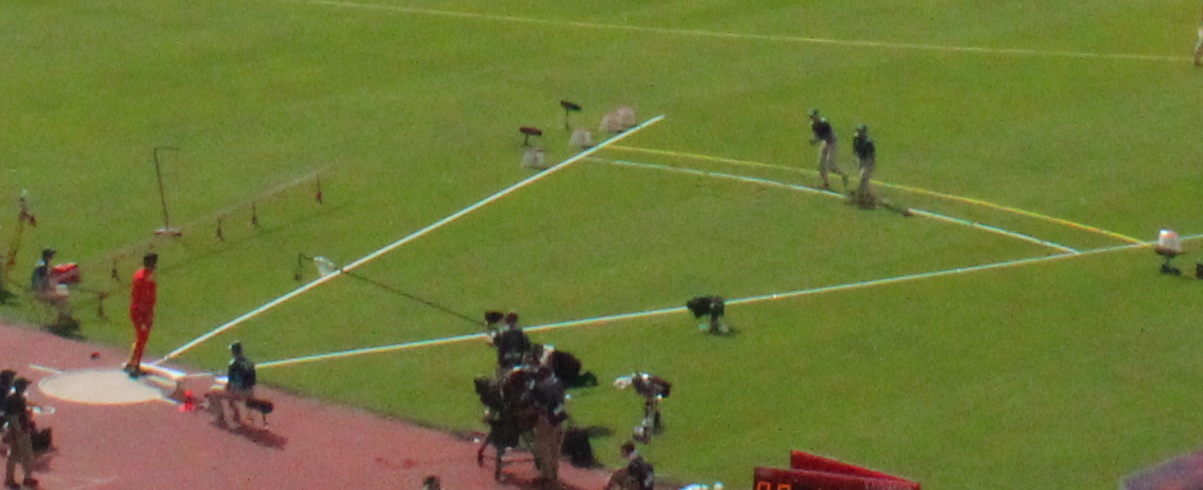

=== Qualifying round ===
Qual. rule: qualification standard 20.65m (Q) or at least best 12 qualified (q).

Rank	Group	Athlete	Nation	1	2	3	Distance	Notes
1	B	Reese Hoffa	United States	21.36	—	—	21.36	Q
2	A	David Storl	Germany	21.15	—	—	21.15	Q
3	A	Tomasz Majewski	Poland	21.03	—	—	21.03	Q
4	B	Ryan Whiting	United States	20.29	20.25	20.78	20.78	Q
5	A	Germán Lauro	Argentina	20.10	X	20.75	20.75	Q, NR
6	A	Pavel Lyzhyn	Belarus	19.85	20.10	20.57	20.57	q
7	B	Dylan Armstrong	Canada	19.99	X	20.49	20.49	q
8	B	Asmir Kolašinac	Serbia	20.44	—	—	20.44	q
9	A	Christian Cantwell	United States	20.41	20.30	19.88	20.41	q
10	B	Maksim Sidorov	Russia	X	19.59	20.40	20.40	q
11	A	Dorian Scott	Jamaica	20.18	20.30	20.31	20.31	q
12	B	Chang Ming-Huang	Chinese Taipei	19.14	X	20.25	20.25	q
13	A	Soslan Tsirikhov	Russia	19.25	19.78	20.17	20.17	
14	A	Rutger Smith	Netherlands	20.08	X	19.55	20.08	
15	A	Marco Fortes	Portugal	19.59	20.06	19.50	20.06	
16	B	Ralf Bartels	Germany	X	20.00	19.89	20.00	
17	B	Nedžad Mulabegović	Croatia	19.18	19.86	19.72	19.86	
18	B	Om Prakash Singh	India	19.40	19.86	X	19.86	
19	B	Hüseyin Atıcı	Turkey	19.47	19.49	19.74	19.74	
20	A	Lajos Kürthy	Hungary	19.65	X	X	19.65	
21	A	Georgi Ivanov	Bulgaria	19.42	19.40	19.63	19.63	
22	B	Antonín Žalský	Czech Republic	X	19.62	19.49	19.62	
23	A	Kemal Mešić	Bosnia and Herzegovina	19.49	X	19.60	19.60	
24	A	Mihail Stamatoyiannis	Greece	18.67	X	19.24	19.24	
25	A	Dale Stevenson	Australia	18.38	19.17	19.01	19.17	
26	A	Māris Urtāns	Latvia	18.92	19.13	X	19.13	
27	B	Kim Christensen	Denmark	18.40	X	19.13	19.13	
28	B	Carl Myerscough	Great Britain	18.75	18.95	X	18.95	
29	B	Raigo Toompuu	Estonia	18.87	18.91	X	18.91	
30	A	Borja Vivas	Spain	18.46	X	18.88	18.88	
31	A	Stephen Saenz	Mexico	X	18.65	X	18.65	
32	B	Amin Nikfar	Iran	18.62	X	X	18.62	
33	B	Carlos Véliz	Cuba	18.26	X	18.57	18.57	
34	B	Emanuele Fuamatu	Samoa	17.78	X	X	17.78	
35	A	Odinn Bjorn Thorsteinsson	Iceland	X	17.04	17.62	17.62	
36	A	Adriatik Hoxha	Albania	17.58	X	17.13	17.58	
—	A	Justin Rodhe	Canada	X	X	X	No mark	
—	B	Zhang Jun	China	X	X	X	No mark	
—	B	Andriy Semenov	Ukraine	X	X	X	No mark	
—	B	Andrei Mikhnevich	Belarus	~~19.81~~	~~19.55~~	~~19.89~~	~~19.89~~	DQ

=== Final ===
Rank	Athlete	Nation	1	2	3	4	5	6	Distance	Notes
1st place, gold medalist(s)	Tomasz Majewski	Poland	21.19	21.72	21.87	X	21.72	21.89	21.89	
2nd place, silver medalist(s)	David Storl	Germany	21.84	21.86	21.41	X	X	X	21.86	PB
3rd place, bronze medalist(s)	Reese Hoffa	United States	20.98	20.95	21.23	21.11	19.53	X	21.23	
4	Christian Cantwell	United States	20.21	20.95	X	X	20.65	21.19	21.19	
5	Dylan Armstrong	Canada	20.16	20.93	20.74	X	X	20.34	20.93	
6	Germán Lauro	Argentina	19.40	20.82	20.84	20.34	20.65	X	20.84	NR
7	Asmir Kolašinac	Serbia	20.18	20.71	X	20.54	20.46	X	20.71	
8	Pavel Lyzhyn	Belarus	20.69	X	X	19.93	20.04	X	20.69	
9	Ryan Whiting	United States	20.21	20.21	20.64	Did not advance			20.64	
10	Dorian Scott	Jamaica	19.51	20.61	X	Did not advance			20.61	
11	Maksim Sidorov	Russia	X	20.41	X	Did not advance			20.41	
12	Chang Ming-Huang	Chinese Taipei	19.99	X	19.64	Did not advance			19.99	
