= 2015 World Championships in Athletics – Men's shot put =

Men's shot put at the 2015 World Championships
- Venue: Beijing National Stadium
- Dates: 23 August
- Competitors: 30 from 22 nations
- Winning distance: 21.93

Medalists
gold medal	Joe Kovacs	United States
silver medal	David Storl	Germany
bronze medal	O'Dayne Richards	Jamaica

The men's shot put at the 2015 World Championships in Athletics was held at the Beijing National Stadium on 23 August.

As the best thrower in a decade, Joe Kovacs looked to be the favorite, though David Storl was the two-time defending champion. With his first throw Kovacs took the lead at 21.23. Storl raised the lead to 21.46 on his second throw. But the surprise leader at the end of the third round was O'Dayne Richards equalling his Jamaican National Record from the Pan American Games at 21.69. In the fourth round, Tomas Walsh threw his Continental Record 21.58 to take the second position. A few throws later, Kovacs moved into second place with his 21.67 fourth throw. The medals were settled in the fifth round when Kovacs threw the 21.93 winner, followed immediately by Storl throwing his 21.74 silver medal winner.

== Records ==
Prior to the competition, the records were as follows:

World record	Randy Barnes (USA)	23.12	Westwood, CA, United States	20 May 1990
Championship record	Werner Günthör (SUI)	22.23	Rome, Italy	29 August 1987
World Leading	Joe Kovacs (USA)	22.56	Monaco	17 July 2015
African record	Janus Robberts (RSA)	21.97	Eugene, OR, United States	2 June 2001
Asian record	Sultan Abdulmajeed Al-Hebshi (KSA)	21.13	Doha, Qatar	8 May 2009
NACAC record	Randy Barnes (USA)	23.12	Westwood, CA, United States	20 May 1990
South American record	Germán Lauro (ARG)	21.26	Doha, Qatar	10 May 2013
European record	Ulf Timmermann (GDR)	23.06	Chania, Greece	22 May 1988
Oceanian record	Tomas Walsh (NZL)	21.50	Mutterstadt, Germany	25 July 2015
The following records were established during the competition:
Oceanian record	Tomas Walsh (NZL)	21.58	Beijing, China	23 August 2015

== Qualification standards ==
Entry standards
20.45

== Schedule ==
Date	Time	Round
23 August 2015	10:05	Qualification
23 August 2015	19:30	Final

All times are local times (UTC+8)

== Results ==
=== Qualification ===
Qualification: 20.65 m (Q) or at least best 12 performers (q).

Rank	Group	Name	Nationality	#1	#2	#3	Mark	Notes
1	A	Joe Kovacs	United States	20.28	21.36		21.36	Q
2	B	David Storl	Germany	21.26			21.26	Q
3	A	Reese Hoffa	United States	20.75			20.75	Q
4	B	Germán Lauro	Argentina	20.64	x		20.64	q
5	B	Christian Cantwell	United States	19.61	x	20.63	20.63	q
6	B	O'Dayne Richards	Jamaica	20.55	20.01	x	20.55	q
7	A	Tomas Walsh	New Zealand	x	20.49	20.31	20.49	q
8	A	Inderjeet Singh	India	19.15	x	20.47	20.47	q
9	A	Asmir Kolašinac	Serbia	19.35	20.37	20.22	20.37	q
10	A	Tomasz Majewski	Poland	20.13	20.11	20.34	20.34	q
11	A	Jan Marcell	Czech Republic	20.32	19.47	x	20.32	q
12	B	Jacko Gill	New Zealand	19.93	19.94	19.79	19.94	q
13	B	Jordan Clarke	United States	19.29	19.88	19.89	19.89	
14	A	Bob Bertemes	Luxembourg	19.87	19.60	19.64	19.87	NR
15	A	Darlan Romani	Brazil	19.86	19.06	19.41	19.86	
16	A	Aleksandr Lesnoy	Russia	19.29	19.78	x	19.78	
17	B	Andrei Gag	Romania	x	19.74	x	19.74	
18	A	Mostafa Amr Hassan	Egypt	18.97	19.42	19.65	19.65	
19	B	Tomáš Staněk	Czech Republic	19.64	19.05	x	19.64	
20	B	Tim Nedow	Canada	19.41	x	19.63	19.63	
21	B	Franck Elemba	Congo	18.59	19.40	19.28	19.40	
22	B	Maksim Sidorov	Russia	x	19.35	19.28	19.35	
23	B	Marin Premeru	Croatia	x	19.33	x	19.33	
24	A	Borja Vivas	Spain	18.88	19.19	19.28	19.28	
25	A	Jaco Engelbrecht	South Africa	19.04	x	x	19.04	
26	A	Tsanko Arnaudov	Portugal	18.01	18.85	x	18.85	
27	B	Orazio Cremona	South Africa	x	18.63	x	18.63	
28	B	Hamza Alić	Bosnia and Herzegovina	x	18.62	x	18.62	
	B	Konrad Bukowiecki	Poland	x	x	x	NM	
	B	Georgi Ivanov	Bulgaria	x	x	x	NM	
	A	Kemal Mešić	Bosnia and Herzegovina				DNS	

=== Final ===
The final was started at 19:30.

Rank	Name	Nationality	# 1	# 2	# 3	# 4	# 5	# 6	Mark	Notes
1st place, gold medalist(s)	Joe Kovacs	United States	21.23	20.48	x	21.67	21.93	21.66	21.93	
2nd place, silver medalist(s)	David Storl	Germany	x	21.46	x	20.44	21.74	21.28	21.74	
3rd place, bronze medalist(s)	O'Dayne Richards	Jamaica	x	20.79	21.69	x	20.54	x	21.69	=NR
4	Tomas Walsh	New Zealand	20.05	x	20.64	21.58	21.01	x	21.58	AR
5	Reese Hoffa	United States	20.61	20.72	x	20.31	21.00	x	21.00	
6	Tomasz Majewski	Poland	20.57	20.82	20.17	20.59	20.50	x	20.82	SB
7	Asmir Kolašinac	Serbia	x	20.11	20.36	x	x	20.71	20.71	
8	Jacko Gill	New Zealand	19.99	20.11	19.54	19.44	19.54	19.49	20.11	
9	Germán Lauro	Argentina	19.70	x	x				19.70	
10	Jan Marcell	Czech Republic	x	19.00	19.69				19.69	
11	Inderjeet Singh	India	19.52	x	18.68				19.52	
	Christian Cantwell	United States							DNS	
