= 2010 European Athletics Championships – Men's shot put =

Men's shot put at the European Athletics Championships

The men's shot put at the 2010 European Athletics Championships was held at the Estadi Olímpic Lluís Companys on 30 and 31 July.

== Medalists ==
Gold	Tomasz Majewski; Poland (POL)
Silver	Ralf Bartels; Germany (GER)
Bronze	Māris Urtāns; Latvia (LAT)

== Records ==
Standing records prior to the 2010 European Athletics Championships
World record	Randy Barnes (USA)	23.12	Westwood, United States	20 May 1990
European record	Ulf Timmermann (GDR)	23.06	Chania, Greece	22 May 1988
Championship record	Werner Günthör (SUI)	22.22	Stuttgart, West Germany	28 August 1986
World Leading	Christian Cantwell (USA)	22.41	Eugene, United States	3 July 2010
European Leading	Andrei Mikhnevich (BLR)	22.09	Minsk, Belarus	14 July 2010

== Schedule ==
Date	Time	Round
30 July 2010	11:30	Qualification
31 July 2010	18:30	Final

== Results ==
=== Qualification ===
Qualification: Qualification Performance 20.00 (Q) or at least 12 best performers advance to the final

Rank	Group	Athlete	Nationality	#1	#2	#3	Result	Notes
DQ	B	Pavel Lyzhyn	Belarus	~~x~~	~~19.43~~	~~20.42~~	~~20.42~~	Q, Doping
1	A	Ralf Bartels	Germany	20.37			20.37	Q
2	A	Tomasz Majewski	Poland	20.36			20.36	Q
DQ	A	Andrei Mikhnevich	Belarus	~~20.35~~			~~20.35~~	Q, Doping
3	B	David Storl	Germany	19.74	x	20.24	20.24	Q
4	B	Māris Urtāns	Latvia	18.55	19.17	20.19	20.19	Q
5	A	Nedžad Mulabegović	Croatia	20.01			20.01	Q
6	A	Antonín Žalský	Czech Republic	19.93	19.78	19.74	19.93	q
7	B	Asmir Kolašinac	Serbia	x	19.75	19.83	19.83	q
8	A	Carl Myerscough	Great Britain & N.I.	19.34	x	19.81	19.81	q
9	B	Jakub Giża	Poland	19.44	18.90	19.69	19.69	q
10	B	Borja Vivas	Spain	19.14	19.21	19.51	19.51	q
11	B	Marco Fortes	Portugal	19.24	19.48	18.70	19.48	
12	A	Taavi Peetre	Estonia	19.42	x	x	19.42	
13	A	Andriy Semenov	Ukraine	19.31	x	x	19.31	
14	A	Lajos Kürthy	Hungary	x	19.15	x	19.15	
15	A	Niklas Arrhenius	Sweden	18.93	x	x	18.93	
16	A	Milan Jotanović	Serbia	18.81	18.38	18.42	18.81	
DQ	B	Remigius Machura	Czech Republic	~~18.71~~	~~18.55~~	~~x~~	~~18.71~~	Doping
17	B	Mihaíl Stamatóyiannis	Greece	18.15	18.28	18.58	18.58	
18	A	Miran Vodovnik	Slovenia	x	18.42	x	18.42	
19	B	Georgi Ivanov	Bulgaria	18.18	18.28	x	18.28	
20	B	Georgios Arestis	Cyprus	x	18.23	17.76	18.23	
21	B	Kim Christensen	Denmark	17.36	18.20	x	18.20	
22	A	Manuel Martínez	Spain	18.08	x	17.73	18.08	
	B	Ódinn Björn Thorsteinsson	Iceland	x	x	x	NM	
	B	Yves Niaré	France	x	x	x	NM	

=== Final ===
Rank	Athlete	Nationality	#1	#2	#3	#4	#5	#6	Result	Notes
DQ	Andrei Mikhnevich	Belarus	~~20.49~~	~~21.01~~	~~20.87~~	~~20.77~~	~~20.58~~	~~20.94~~	~~21.01~~	Doping
1st place, gold medalist(s)	Tomasz Majewski	Poland	20.66	20.83	20.78	21.00	20.96	20.59	21.00	
2nd place, silver medalist(s)	Ralf Bartels	Germany	20.23	20.22	20.40	20.22	20.65	20.93	20.93	
3rd place, bronze medalist(s)	Māris Urtāns	Latvia	19.81	20.12	x	20.56	20.72	20.64	20.72	
4	David Storl	Germany	20.24	20.24	x	20.28	x	20.57	20.57	
5	Nedžad Mulabegović	Croatia	20.56	x	20.33	19.90	20.50	20.37	20.56	PB
DQ	Pavel Lyzhyn	Belarus	~~x~~	~~19.93~~	~~20.11~~	~~x~~	~~x~~	~~x~~	~~20.11~~	Doping
7	Antonín Žalský	Czech Republic	20.01	x	x	19.58	x	x	20.01	
8	Asmir Kolašinac	Serbia	19.61	x	19.77				19.77	
9	Jakub Giża	Poland	18.63	19.04	19.73				19.73	
10	Borja Vivas	Spain	19.04	18.94	19.12				19.12	
11	Carl Myerscough	Great Britain & N.I.	x	x	18.19				18.19	
