= 2004 World Junior Championships in Athletics – Men's discus throw =

The men's discus throw event at the 2004 World Junior Championships in Athletics was held in Grosseto, Italy, at Stadio Olimpico Carlo Zecchini on 16 and 18 July. A 1.75 kg (junior implement) discus was used.

== Medalists ==
Gold	Ehsan Hadadi; Iran
Silver	Oleg Pirog; Russia
Bronze	Luka Rujević; Serbia and Montenegro

== Results ==
=== Final ===
18 July

Rank	Name	Nationality	Attempts						Result	Notes
Rank	Name	Nationality	1	2	3	4	5	6	Result	Notes
1st place, gold medalist(s)	Ehsan Hadadi	Iran	57.12	59.17	60.01	62.14	60.98	x	62.14	
2nd place, silver medalist(s)	Oleg Pirog	Russia	58.27	57.84	55.98	x	x	60.28	60.28	
3rd place, bronze medalist(s)	Luka Rujević	Serbia and Montenegro	59.58	x	59.82	59.16	x	x	59.82	
4	Dmitriy Isnyuk	Ukraine	58.56	54.20	59.19	x	57.02	x	59.19	
5	Roman Ryzhyy	Ukraine	58.19	58.02	58.51	57.64	x	56.34	58.51	
6	Margus Hunt	Estonia	x	55.87	57.67	58.30	56.25	x	58.30	
7	Ronnie Buckley	Australia	58.11	57.00	54.90	x	x	56.67	58.11	
8	Martin Wierig	Germany	53.98	57.28	57.76	57.88	x	55.96	57.88	
9	Sultan Al-Dawoodi	Saudi Arabia	x	57.67	x				57.67	
10	Sergey Gribkov	Russia	49.57	x	57.09				57.09	
11	Nazzareno Di Marco	Italy	x	52.70	x				52.70	
12	Lajos Kürthy	Hungary	45.47	49.90	52.15				52.15	

=== Qualifications ===
16 July

==== Group A ====
Rank	Name	Nationality	Attempts			Result	Notes
Rank	Name	Nationality	1	2	3	Result	Notes
1	Roman Ryzhyy	Ukraine	55.86	58.71	-	58.71	Q
2	Ronnie Buckley	Australia	x	56.35	58.22	58.22	Q
3	Oleg Pirog	Russia	58.04	-	-	58.04	Q
4	Margus Hunt	Estonia	48.08	x	55.87	55.87	q
5	Nazzareno Di Marco	Italy	x	55.12	x	55.12	q
6	Sultan Al-Dawoodi	Saudi Arabia	48.14	x	54.96	54.96	q
7	Robert McDade	United States	54.70	53.39	49.81	54.70	
8	Stefan Keller	Germany	x	53.95	53.21	53.95	
9	Mihai Grasu	Romania	52.16	x	52.97	52.97	
10	Wang Yao-Hui	Chinese Taipei	52.64	51.32	x	52.64	
11	Wu Jian	China	51.22	51.04	51.83	51.83	
12	Kemal Mešić	Bosnia and Herzegovina	49.06	49.04	x	49.06	

==== Group B ====
Rank	Name	Nationality	Attempts			Result	Notes
Rank	Name	Nationality	1	2	3	Result	Notes
1	Ehsan Hadadi	Iran	61.15	-	-	61.15	Q
2	Dmitriy Isnyuk	Ukraine	55.15	59.83	-	59.83	Q
3	Luka Rujević	Serbia and Montenegro	x	58.37	-	58.37	Q
4	Sergey Gribkov	Russia	51.25	56.46	x	56.46	q
5	Martin Wierig	Germany	54.23	53.97	55.93	55.93	q
6	Lajos Kürthy	Hungary	55.00	54.30	51.50	55.00	q
7	Raffaell Laurins	Australia	x	49.73	54.55	54.55	
8	Orestis Antoniades	Cyprus	54.38	51.57	49.77	54.38	
9	Jens Kujacznski	United States	x	53.69	53.00	53.69	
10	Kamil Grzegorczyk	Poland	49.97	x	53.54	53.54	
11	Simon Cooke	United Kingdom	52.30	49.56	50.88	52.30	
12	Saad Al-Bakhmi	Saudi Arabia	51.24	6.25	x	51.24	
13	Henrik Laitasalo	Finland	49.32	48.28	50.05	50.05	

== Participation ==
According to an unofficial count, 25 athletes from 19 countries participated in the event.

- Australia (2)
- Bosnia and Herzegovina (1)
- China (1)
- Chinese Taipei (1)
- Cyprus (1)
- Estonia (1)
- Finland (1)
- Germany (2)
- Hungary (1)
- Iran (1)
- Italy (1)
- Poland (1)
- Romania (1)
- Russia (2)
- Saudi Arabia (2)
- Serbia and Montenegro (1)
- Ukraine (2)
- United Kingdom (1)
- United States (2)
