= 2012 European Athletics Championships – Men's shot put =

Men's shot put at the European Athletics Championships

The men's shot put at the 2012 European Athletics Championships was held at the Helsinki Olympic Stadium on 27 and 29 June.

== Medalists ==
Gold	David Storl; Germany
Silver	Rutger Smith; Netherlands
Bronze	Asmir Kolašinac; Serbia

== Records ==
Standing records prior to the 2012 European Athletics Championships
World record	Randy Barnes (USA)	23.12	Westwood, United States	20 May 1990
European record	Ulf Timmermann (GDR)	23.06	Chania, Greece	22 May 1988
Championship record	Werner Günthör (SUI)	22.22	Stuttgart, West Germany	28 August 1986
World Leading	Reese Hoffa (USA)	22.00	Eugene, United States	24 June 2012
European Leading	Tomasz Majewski (POL)	21.60	Eugene, United States	2 June 2012

== Schedule ==
Date	Time	Round
27 June 2012	9:45	Qualification
29 June 2012	21:20	Final

== Results ==
=== Qualification ===
Qualification: Qualification Performance 20.30 (Q) or at least 12 best performers advance to the final

Rank	Group	Athlete	Nationality	#1	#2	#3	Result	Notes
1	B	Rutger Smith	Netherlands	20.55			20.55	Q, SB
2	A	David Storl	Germany	20.30			20.30	Q
3	A	Antonín Žalský	Czech Republic	19.94	19.88	–	19.94	q
4	B	Marco Schmidt	Germany	19.18	19.85	x	19.85	q
5	B	Nedžad Mulabegović	Croatia	19.47	19.49	19.79	19.79	q
6	A	Kim Christensen	Denmark	18.77	18.83	19.69	19.69	q
7	A	Borja Vivas	Spain	19.67	x	x	19.67	q
8	B	Marco Fortes	Portugal	19.15	18.84	19.66	19.66	q
9	B	Hüseyin Atıcı	Turkey	17.96	x	19.64	19.64	q
10	A	Asmir Kolašinac	Serbia	19.42	19.62	x	19.62	q
11	A	Dmytro Savytskyy	Ukraine	19.23	19.52	19.51	19.52	q
12	B	Lajos Kürthy	Hungary	x	19.11	19.48	19.48	q
13	A	Leif Arrhenius	Sweden	x	18.64	19.33	19.33	
14	A	Carl Myerscough	Great Britain	18.61	19.30	x	19.30	
15	A	Māris Urtāns	Latvia	19.08	19.25	x	19.25	
16	B	Georgi Ivanov	Bulgaria	19.14	19.02	x	19.14	
17	B	Hamza Alić	Bosnia and Herzegovina	18.66	18.84	19.03	19.03	
18	B	Michalis Stamatogiannis	Greece	18.68	18.94	18.95	18.95	
19	B	Ladislav Prášil	Czech Republic	18.87	x	x	18.87	
20	A	Marin Premeru	Croatia	18.71	x	18.56	18.71	
21	B	Božidar Antunović	Serbia	18.69	x	18.56	18.69	
22	A	Ódinn Björn Thorsteinsson	Iceland	x	18.19	x	18.19	
23	A	Georgios Arestis	Cyprus	18.16	18.13	18.15	18.16	
24	B	Adriatik Hoxha	Albania	16.40	x	17.00	17.00	
	A	Anton Lyuboslavskiy	Russia				DNS	
	B	Damian Kusiak	Poland				DNS	

=== Final ===
Rank	Athlete	Nationality	#1	#2	#3	#4	#5	#6	Result	Notes
1st place, gold medalist(s)	David Storl	Germany	21.19	x	21.58	x	x	–	21.58	SB
2nd place, silver medalist(s)	Rutger Smith	Netherlands	20.25	x	20.55	x	20.15	x	20.55	=SB
3rd place, bronze medalist(s)	Asmir Kolašinac	Serbia	20.22	20.36	x	19.88	20.33	x	20.36	
4	Hüseyin Atıcı	Turkey	18.70	20.24	20.02	20.08	19.89	x	20.24	
5	Marco Fortes	Portugal	19.47	19.29	20.24	19.38	19.84	18.54	20.24	
6	Antonín Žalský	Czech Republic	19.94	x	19.63	x	x	x	19.94	
7	Borja Vivas	Spain	19.54	19.59	19.81	19.37	19.35	19.37	19.81	
8	Marco Schmidt	Germany	19.42	19.65	x	x	x	18.97	19.65	
9	Lajos Kürthy	Hungary	19.23	19.55	x				19.55	
10	Dmytro Savytskyy	Ukraine	19.30	x	19.30				19.30	
11	Nedžad Mulabegović	Croatia	19.26	x	19.09				19.26	
12	Kim Christensen	Denmark	18.72	19.00	18.91				19.00	
