= 2010 USA Indoor Track and Field Championships =

- Dates: February 27–28
- Host city: Albuquerque, New Mexico, United States
- Venue: Albuquerque Convention Center
- Level: Senior
- Type: Indoor
- Events: 26 (men: 13; women: 13) + 2

The 2010 USA Indoor Track and Field Championships was held at Albuquerque Convention Center in Albuquerque, New Mexico. Organized by USA Track and Field (USATF), the two-day competition took place February 27–28 and served as the national championships in indoor track and field for the United States. The championships in combined track and field events were held two weeks later from March 6–7 at Gladstein Fieldhouse at Indiana University Bloomington, Indiana.

The competition served as the selection meet for the United States team for the 2010 IAAF World Indoor Championships, held in Doha, Qatar. Five American national champions went on to become world champions: Bernard Lagat in the 3000 meters, Christian Cantwell in the shot put, Debbie Dunn in the 400-meter dash, Lolo Jones in the 60-meter hurdles and Brittney Reese in the long jump.

== Medal summary ==
=== Men ===
Event	Gold		Silver		Bronze	
60 meters (Note: Ivory Williams finished first in a time of 6.49 seconds, but his results were nullified after the race because he tested positive for marijuana metabolites.)	Mike Rodgers	6.52	Trell Kimmons	6.56	Walter Dix	6.58
400 meters	Bershawn Jackson	45.41 PB	Jamaal Torrance	45.76 PB	Greg Nixon	45.77 PB
800 meters	Nick Symmonds	1:48.10	Duane Solomon	1:48.41	Tyler Mulder	1:48.53
1500 meters	Leonel Manzano	3:49.16	Will Leer	3:49.31	David Torrence	3:50.08
3000 meters	Bernard Lagat	8:12.60	Galen Rupp	8:13.49	Chris Solinsky	8:13.85
60 m hurdles	Terrence Trammell	7.41	David Oliver	7.54	Jeff Porter	7.62 PB
5000 m walk	Tim Seaman	20:57.47	Patrick Stroupe	21:19.90	Ben Shorey	22:06.36
High jump	Jesse Williams	2.34	Dusty Jonas	2.31	Andra Manson	2.31
Pole vault	Tim Mack	5.70	Derek Miles	5.70	Darren Niedermeyer	5.60
Long jump	Jeremy Hicks	7.94	Jeff Henderson	7.94 PB	Norris Frederick	7.89
Triple jump	Lawrence Willis	16.86 PB	Brandon Roulhac	16.72	Allen Simms	16.49
Shot put	Christian Cantwell	21.13	Ryan Whiting	21.03	Cory Martin	20.60 PB
Weight throw	A. G. Kruger	24.99 PB	Cory Martin	24.38 PB	Jake Freeman	23.98
Heptathlon	Jake Arnold	5861 pts	Tom Pappas	5845 pts	Skyler Reising	5487 pts

=== Women ===
Event	Gold		Silver		Bronze	
60 meters	Carmelita Jeter	7.02 PB	Mikele Barber	7.15	Gloria Asumnu	7.18
400 meters	Debbie Dunn	50.86 PB	DeeDee Trotter	51.23 PB	Allyson Felix	51.37 PB
800 meters	Anna Pierce	2:00.84	Alysia Johnson	2:01.45	Heather Dorniden	2:02.33 PB
1500 meters	Morgan Uceny	4:19.46 PB	Shannon Rowbury	4:19.48 PB	Erin Donohue	4:21.86
3000 meters	Renee Baillie	9:14.90	Sara Hall	9:14.92	Shannon Rowbury	9:15.41
60 m hurdles	Virginia Powell	7.87	Lolo Jones	7.89	Damu Cherry	7.90
3000 m walk	Maria Michta	13:51.33 PB	Joanne Dow	14:01.53	Teresa Vaill	14:09.42
High jump	Chaunté Lowe	1.98 PB	Deirdre Mullen	1.86	Raevan Harris	1.86
Pole vault	Lacy Janson	4.65	Chelsea Johnson	4.60	Becky Holliday	4.55 PB
Long jump	Brittney Reese	6.89 PB	Brianna Glenn	6.78 PB	Hyleas Fountain	6.70 PB
Triple jump	Erica McLain	14.06	Shakeema Welsch	13.73	Crystal Manning	13.62
Shot put	Jillian Camarena-Williams	18.63	Michelle Carter	18.03	Sarah Stevens	17.99
Weight throw	Amber Campbell	24.70 PB	Loree Smith	21.99	Erin Gilreath	21.92
Pentathlon	Diana Pickler	4544 pts	Bettie Wade	4469 pts	Sharon Day	4467 pts
