= Athletics at the 2009 Summer Universiade – Men's shot put =

The men's shot put event at the 2009 Summer Universiade was held on 7 July.

The winning margin was 1 cm which was also the winning margin for the men's shot put at the 1995 games. As of 2024, these are the only two occasions where the men's shot put was won by less than 4 cm at these games.

== Medalists ==
Gold	Silver	Bronze
Soslan Tsyrikhov; Russia	Zhang Jun; China	Krzysztof Krzywosz; Poland

== Results ==
=== Qualification ===
Qualification: 18.50 m (Q) or at least 12 best (q) qualified for the final.

Rank	Group	Athlete	Nationality	#1	#2	#3	Result	Notes
1	A	Zhang Jun	China	19.14			19.14	Q
2	A	Borja Vivas	Spain	18.10	x	19.05	19.05	Q
3	A	Asmir Kolašinac	Serbia	x	19.03		19.03	Q
4	B	Soslan Tsyrikhov	Russia	18.86			18.86	Q
5	A	Krzysztof Krzywosz	Poland	18.11	18.83		18.83	Q
6	A	Māris Urtāns	Latvia	18.75			18.75	Q
7	B	Raigo Toompuu	Estonia	18.63			18.63	Q
8	B	Chang Ming-Huang	Chinese Taipei	17.52	18.60		18.60	Q
9	B	Georgios Arestis	Cyprus	x	18.58		18.58	Q
10	A	Egor Malinkin	Russia	x	18.55		18.55	Q, SB
11	B	Laurentin Flotin Popa	Romania	x	18.51		18.51	Q
12	A	Kemal Mešić	Bosnia and Herzegovina	17.75	18.48	x	18.48	q
13	A	Milan Jotanović	Serbia	17.79	18.14	17.86	18.14	
14	A	Feng Jie	China	16.21	16.77	17.88	17.88	
15	A	Dale Stevenson	Australia	17.17	17.81	17.74	17.81	
16	A	Rosen Karamfilov	Bulgaria	15.97	16.88	17.58	17.58	
17	B	Ross Jordaan	South Africa	17.50	x	x	17.50	
18	B	Donovan Snyman	South Africa	16.85	x	17.07	17.07	
19	B	Semir Begić	Bosnia and Herzegovina	16.71	16.56	x	16.71	
20	B	Panagiotis Anyfandis	Greece	15.61	15.95	x	15.95	
21	A	Michael Torie	United States	14.22	x	14.79	14.79	
22	B	Daniel Rubangakene	Uganda	13.75	12.50	13.43	13.75	
23	B	Charles Anywar	Uganda	11.79	10.97	12.20	12.20	
	B	Jakub Giża	Poland				DNS	
	B	Jan Marcell	Czech Republic				DNS	

=== Final ===
Rank	Athlete	Nationality	#1	#2	#3	#4	#5	#6	Result	Notes
1st place, gold medalist(s)	Soslan Tsyrikhov	Russia	19.38	x	19.00	19.47	19.59	x	19.59	SB
2nd place, silver medalist(s)	Zhang Jun	China	19.16	19.58	x	x	x	x	19.58	PB
3rd place, bronze medalist(s)	Krzysztof Krzywosz	Poland	19.00	18.58	18.81	19.24	19.38	19.22	19.38	
4	Raigo Toompuu	Estonia	18.70	19.31	19.15	18.85	19.30	x	19.31	
5	Māris Urtāns	Latvia	18.78	18.64	x	x	x	19.09	19.09	
6	Egor Malinkin	Russia	18.38	18.58	18.47	18.28	18.21	18.72	18.72	SB
7	Borja Vivas	Spain	x	18.72	x	x	18.44	18.49	18.72	
8	Chang Ming-Huang	Chinese Taipei	18.42	x	x	18.39	x	x	18.42	
9	Kemal Mešić	Bosnia and Herzegovina	18.37	x	x				18.37	
10	Laurentin Flotin Popa	Romania	18.36	18.00	17.81				18.36	
	Georgios Arestis	Cyprus	x	x	x				NM	
	Asmir Kolašinac	Serbia	x	x	x				NM	
