= 2010 IAAF World Indoor Championships – Men's shot put =

The men's shot put at the 2010 IAAF World Indoor Championships was held at the ASPIRE Dome on 12 and 13 March.

== Medalists ==
Gold	Silver	Bronze
Christian Cantwell; United States	Ralf Bartels; Germany	Dylan Armstrong; Canada

== Records ==
Standing records prior to the 2010 IAAF World Indoor Championships
World record	Randy Barnes (USA)	22.66	Los Angeles, United States	20 January 1989
Championship record	Ulf Timmermann (GDR)	22.24	Indianapolis, United States	7 March 1987
World Leading	Christian Cantwell (USA)	21.95	New York City, United States	29 January 2010
African record	Janus Robberts (RSA)	21.47	Norman, United States	1 December 2001
Asian record	Khalid Habash Al-Suwaidi (QAT)	20.09	Schio, Italy	11 February 2006
European record	Ulf Timmermann (GDR)	22.55	Senftenberg, East Germany	11 February 1989
North and Central American and Caribbean record	Randy Barnes (USA)	22.66	Los Angeles, United States	20 January 1989
Oceanian Record	Scott Martin (AUS)	20.83	Valencia, Spain	7 March 2008
South American record	Gert Weil (CHI)	20.15	Leverkusen, West Germany	31 January 1985

== Qualification standards ==
Indoor
20.00 m

== Schedule ==
Date	Time	Round
March 12, 2010	9:20	Qualification, Group A
March 12, 2010	10:30	Qualification, Group B
March 13, 2010	16:20	Final

== Results ==
=== Qualification ===
Qualification: Qualifying Performance 20.30 (Q) or at least 8 best performers (q) advance to the final.

Rank	Group	Athlete	Nationality	#1	#2	#3	Result	Notes
1	A	Ralf Bartels	Germany	20.22	20.91		20.91	Q
2	B	Christian Cantwell	United States	20.72			20.72	Q
3	B	Scott Martin	Australia	19.51	20.21	20.61	20.61	Q, SB
4	A	Dylan Armstrong	Canada	20.08	20.50		20.50	Q
5	B	David Storl	Germany	x	18.33	20.49	20.49	Q
6	B	Carl Myerscough	Great Britain	18.79	x	20.44	20.44	Q, SB
DQ	B	Pavel Lyzhyn	Belarus	~~20.42~~			~~20.42~~	Q
7	B	Tomasz Majewski	Poland	20.27	x	20.38	20.38	Q
DQ	A	Andrei Mikhnevich	Belarus	~~20.34~~			~~20.34~~	Q
8	A	Cory Martin	United States	19.32	x	20.23	20.23	
9	B	Asmir Kolašinac	Serbia	x	20.03	20.10	20.10	
10	A	Jan Marcell	Czech Republic	x	x	20.04	20.04	
11	A	Māris Urtāns	Latvia	18.95	x	19.97	19.97	
12	A	Maksim Sidorov	Russia	18.10	19.88	x	19.88	
13	A	Miran Vodovnik	Slovenia	19.59	x	19.82	19.82	SB
14	A	Mihail Stamatoyiannis	Greece	19.07	x	19.51	19.51	
15	B	Lajos Kürthy	Hungary	19.43	x	19.26	19.43	
16	B	Sultan Al-Hebshi	Saudi Arabia	17.98	18.58	18.67	18.67	
17	A	Zhang Jun	China	18.51	x	x	18.51	
18	B	Yasser Ibrahim Farag	Egypt	18.06	x	17.75	18.06	SB
	B	Marco Fortes	Portugal	x	x	x	NM	

=== Final ===
Rank	Athlete	Nationality	#1	#2	#3	#4	#5	#6	Result	Notes
Gold medal	Christian Cantwell	United States	21.60	x	21.07	21.13	21.14	21.83	21.83	
DQ	Andrei Mikhnevich	Belarus	~~20.81~~	~~21.20~~	~~21.49~~	~~21.10~~	~~21.68~~	~~21.45~~	~~21.68~~	
Silver medal	Ralf Bartels	Germany	20.43	21.44	21.04	20.76	20.35	20.93	21.44	PB
Bronze medal	Dylan Armstrong	Canada	21.12	20.62	20.92	x	21.39	x	21.39	NR
4	Tomasz Majewski	Poland	21.20	x	20.46	x	20.84	20.98	21.20	NR
DQ	Pavel Lyzhyn	Belarus	x	~~19.77~~	~~20.03~~	~~20.67~~	x	x	~~20.67~~	
5	David Storl	Germany	x	x	20.20	19.97	20.40	x	20.40	
6	Scott Martin	Australia	x	x	19.36	19.76	x	x	19.76	
7	Carl Myerscough	Great Britain	x	18.50	x	18.66	x	x	18.66	
