= Maksim Sidorov (shot putter) =

Russian shot putter

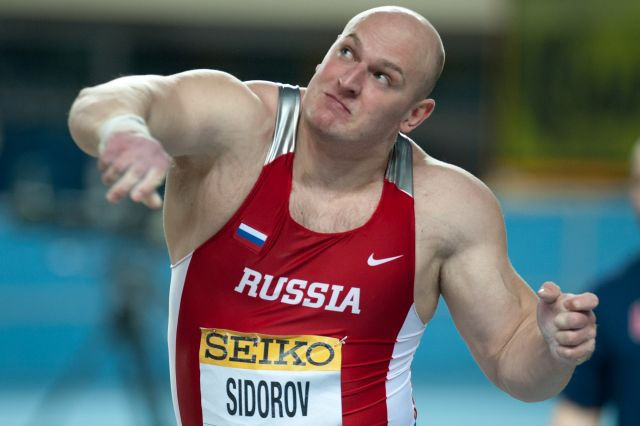
- Sidorov during 2012 IAAF World Indoor Championships in Istanbul.

Personal information
- Nationality: Russian
- Born: 13 May 1986 (age 40) Moscow, Russia
- Height: 1.88 m (6 ft 2 in)
- Weight: 120 kg (265 lb)

Sport
- Sport: Track and field
- Event: Shot put
- Club: Dynamo Sports Club

Achievements and titles
- Personal best: 21.45m
Medal record
European Indoor Championships
Bronze medal – third place	2011 Paris	Shot put
Summer Universiade
Gold medal – first place	2007 Bangkok	Shot put

Maksim Viktorovich Sidorov (Russian: Максим Викторович Сидоров; born 13 May 1986) is a Russian shot putter. He has a personal best throw of 21.51 metres (70.571 ft).

== Career ==
Sidorov narrowly missed making the final of the shot put at the 2012 IAAF World Indoor Championships, finishing seventh in his qualifying group, and 14th overall with a mark of 19.88 m.

Sidorov took his first senior international championship medal, when he threw 20.55m for bronze at the 2011 European Indoor Championships in Paris. He threw 21.45m on 22 July to win the Russian National Championships. In doing so, he overtook David Storl and Aleksandr Lobynya as the best European outdoor shot putter and best Russian outdoor shot putter respectively in 2011. He also competed at the 2012 Summer Olympics.

In 2017, he tested for a positive for a banned substance Indapamide and was disqualified for a year starting in July 2017.

== International competitions ==
Year	Competition	Venue	Position	Event	Notes
Representing Russia
2005	European Junior Championships	Kaunas, Lithuania	3rd	Shot put (6 kg)	19.32 m
2007	European U23 Championships	Debrecen, Hungary	8th	Shot put	18.24 m
2007	Universiade	Bangkok, Thailand	1st	Shot put	20.01 m
2009	World Championships	Berlin, Germany	30th (q)	Shot put	18.92 m
2010	World Indoor Championships	Doha, Qatar	13th (q)	Shot put	19.88 m
2011	European Indoor Championships	Paris, France	3rd	Shot put	20.55 m
2012	World Indoor Championships	Istanbul, Turkey	5th	Shot put	20.78 m
2012	Olympic Games	London, United Kingdom	11th	Shot put	20.41 m
2013	European Indoor Championships	Gothenburg, Sweden	12th (q)	Shot put	19.58 m
2013	World Championships	Moscow, Russia	13th (q)	Shot put	19.63 m
2014	World Indoor Championships	Sopot, Poland	16th (q)	Shot put	18.98 m
2015	European Indoor Championships	Prague, Czech Republic	14th (q)	Shot put	19.45 m
2015	World Championships	Beijing, China	22nd (q)	Shot put	19.35 m

== See also ==
- List of doping cases in athletics
