= Athletics at the 2007 Summer Universiade – Men's shot put =

The men's shot put event at the 2007 Summer Universiade was held on 14 August.

== Results ==
Rank	Athlete	Nationality	#1	#2	#3	#4	#5	$6	Result	Notes
1st place, gold medalist(s)	Maksim Sidorov	Russia	18.68	20.01	18.79	18.83	19.33	x	20.01	
2nd place, silver medalist(s)	Māris Urtāns	Latvia	19.38	x	19.37	x	x	x	19.38	
3rd place, bronze medalist(s)	Chang Ming-huang	Chinese Taipei	18.39	19.05	19.36	18.88	x	18.84	19.36	
4	Mehdi Shahrokhi	Iran	18.17	x	18.65	x	19.15	18.99	19.15	
5	Aleksander Grekov	Russia	18.72	18.94	x	x	x	x	18.94	
6	Asmir Kolašinac	Serbia	18.50	x	x	x	18.34	18.90	18.90	
7	Sven Hahn	Germany	17.40	18.26	18.72	18.24	18.24	x	18.72	
8	Andrei Siniakou	Belarus	x	18.42	x	x	x	x	18.42	
9	Borja Vivas	Spain	18.14	18.34	x				18.34	
10	Chatchawal Polyiam	Thailand	17.18	18.03	x				18.03	PB
11	Germán Millán	Spain	18.01	17.63	x				18.01	
12	Sourabh Vij	India	x	16.81	17.96				17.96	
13	Andrus Niit	Estonia	17.59	17.31	x				17.59	
14	Georgios Arestis	Cyprus	16.70	17.56	x				17.56	
15	Roelof Potgieter	South Africa	x	17.53	x				17.53	
16	Sarayudh Pinitjit	Thailand	x	15.35	16.09				16.09	
17	Linus Nicholas	Malaysia	11.46	12.15	x				12.15	
18	Charles Anywar	Uganda	11.07	x	11.82				11.82	
19	Sonam Rinzin	Bhutan	9.81	10.40	10.45				10.45	
