= 2004 World Junior Championships in Athletics – Men's shot put =

The men's shot put event at the 2004 World Junior Championships in Athletics was held in Grosseto, Italy, at Stadio Olimpico Carlo Zecchini on 13 July. A 6 kg (junior implement) shot was used.

== Medalists ==
Gold	Georgi Ivanov; Bulgaria
Silver	Jakub Giża; Poland
Bronze	Aleksandr Grekov; Russia

== Results ==
=== Final ===
13 July

Rank	Name	Nationality	Attempts						Result	Notes
Rank	Name	Nationality	1	2	3	4	5	6	Result	Notes
1st place, gold medalist(s)	Georgi Ivanov	Bulgaria	19.76	20.02	19.85	20.70	x	x	20.70	
2nd place, silver medalist(s)	Jakub Giża	Poland	17.76	19.41	19.68	18.91	19.73	20.05	20.05	
3rd place, bronze medalist(s)	Aleksandr Grekov	Russia	19.70	19.34	x	x	19.80	19.98	19.98	
4	Seyed Mehdi Shahrokhi	Iran	x	19.65	x	19.80	19.11	x	19.80	
5	Sun Ke	China	x	x	18.80	x	19.11	19.22	19.22	
6	Luka Rujević	Serbia and Montenegro	18.92	x	x	x	19.15	x	19.15	
7	Piotr Golba	Poland	18.37	18.21	18.79	19.12	18.88	18.37	19.12	
8	Kyle Helf	Canada	17.85	19.03	x	x	18.66	18.66	19.03	
9	Mamuka Tugushi	Georgia	18.17	18.56	18.31				18.56	
10	Aleksandr Shkolnikau	Belarus	x	17.91	18.44				18.44	
11	Cory Martin	United States	18.23	x	x				18.23	
12	Justin Clickett	United States	x	17.12	18.10				18.10	

=== Qualifications ===
13 July

==== Group A ====
Rank	Name	Nationality	Attempts			Result	Notes
Rank	Name	Nationality	1	2	3	Result	Notes
1	Georgi Ivanov	Bulgaria	19.64	-	-	19.64	Q
2	Jakub Giża	Poland	x	x	18.81	18.81	q
3	Luka Rujević	Serbia and Montenegro	18.79	x	x	18.79	q
4	Kyle Helf	Canada	18.04	18.30	18.75	18.75	q
5	Aleksandr Shkolnikau	Belarus	18.42	18.73	x	18.73	q
6	Justin Clickett	United States	18.49	x	18.20	18.49	q
7	Raffaell Laurins	Australia	x	x	18.44	18.44	
8	Alexander Rödiger	Germany	17.87	17.40	18.14	18.14	
9	Lajos Kürthy	Hungary	17.62	17.46	18.05	18.05	
10	Vadym Boychuk	Ukraine	17.39	18.03	17.42	18.03	
11	Eugenio Umberto Mannucci	Italy	17.59	17.94	17.86	17.94	
12	Andrus Niit	Estonia	17.35	17.37	x	17.37	
13	Daniel Anglés	Spain	x	17.32	17.28	17.32	
14	Mihai Grasu	Romania	16.69	17.09	16.54	17.09	
15	Kosie Barnard	South Africa	16.71	x	x	16.71	
16	Jan Marcell	Czech Republic	x	x	16.64	16.64	
	Said Al-Yami	Saudi Arabia	x	x	x	NM	

==== Group B ====
Rank	Name	Nationality	Attempts			Result	Notes
Rank	Name	Nationality	1	2	3	Result	Notes
1	Seyed Mehdi Shahrokhi	Iran	18.82	19.78	-	19.78	Q
2	Aleksandr Grekov	Russia	18.91	19.02	-	19.02	Q
3	Piotr Golba	Poland	18.92	x	18.25	18.92	q
4	Cory Martin	United States	x	x	18.69	18.69	q
5	Sun Ke	China	x	18.65	x	18.65	q
6	Mamuka Tugushi	Georgia	18.62	x	18.03	18.62	q
7	Chris Gearing	United Kingdom	18.23	18.35	18.48	18.48	
8	Viktor Samolyuk	Ukraine	17.53	17.48	18.19	18.19	
9	Ameen Al-Aradi	Saudi Arabia	18.11	x	x	18.11	
10	Stefan Keller	Germany	x	17.87	17.84	17.87	
11	Remigius Machura	Czech Republic	17.62	x	17.82	17.82	
12	Ali Said	Kuwait	16.80	16.84	17.69	17.69	
13	Mindaugas Kriziokas	Lithuania	17.40	x	17.54	17.54	
14	Mostafa El-Moaty	Egypt	17.34	17.16	17.50	17.50	
15	Antonio Luis Zuasti	Spain	16.66	x	x	16.66	
	Ross Jordaan	South Africa	x	x	x	NM	

== Participation ==
According to an unofficial count, 33 athletes from 25 countries participated in the event.

- Australia (1)
- Belarus (1)
- Bulgaria (1)
- Canada (1)
- China (1)
- Czech Republic (2)
- Egypt (1)
- Estonia (1)
- Georgia (1)
- Germany (2)
- Hungary (1)
- Iran (1)
- Italy (1)
- Kuwait (1)
- Lithuania (1)
- Poland (2)
- Romania (1)
- Russia (1)
- Saudi Arabia (2)
- Serbia and Montenegro (1)
- South Africa (2)
- Spain (2)
- Ukraine (2)
- United Kingdom (1)
- United States (2)
