= 2005 European Athletics U23 Championships – Men's shot put =

The men's shot put event at the 2005 European Athletics U23 Championships was held in Erfurt, Germany, at Steigerwaldstadion on 15 and 17 July.

== Medalists ==
Gold	Anton Lyuboslavskiy; Russia
Silver	Taavi Peetre; Estonia
Bronze	Mika Vasara; Finland

== Results ==
=== Final ===
17 July

Rank	Name	Nationality	Attempts						Result	Notes
Rank	Name	Nationality	1	2	3	4	5	6	Result	Notes
1st place, gold medalist(s)	Anton Lyuboslavskiy	Russia	19.32	20.44	x	x	x	19.91	20.44	CR
2nd place, silver medalist(s)	Taavi Peetre	Estonia	19.47	19.78	19.85	x	x	19.80	19.85	
3rd place, bronze medalist(s)	Mika Vasara	Finland	18.54	19.15	x	19.50	19.46	19.84	19.84	
4	Georgi Ivanov	Bulgaria	18.60	x	18.32	18.26	x	19.51	19.51	
5	Magnus Lohse	Sweden	18.86	x	x	x	x	x	18.86	
6	Robert Dippl	Germany	18.68	x	18.23	x	x	x	18.68	
7	Jakub Giża	Poland	18.17	x	18.11	17.74	18.68	x	18.68	
8	Borja Vivas	Spain	17.11	17.36	18.13	17.78	x	x	18.13	
9	Krzysztof Krzywosz	Poland	17.31	17.50	x				17.50	
10	Philipp Barth	Germany	17.38	x	17.37				17.38	
11	Jaroslav Pittner	Slovakia	16.68	x	–				16.68	
	Luka Rujević	Serbia and Montenegro	x	x	x				NM	

=== Qualifications ===
15 July
Qualifying 18.40 or 12 best to the Final

==== Group A ====
Rank	Name	Nationality	Result	Notes
1	Anton Lyuboslavskiy	Russia	19.05	Q
2	Robert Dippl	Germany	18.81	Q
3	Luka Rujević	Serbia and Montenegro	18.32	q
4	Borja Vivas	Spain	18.00	q
5	Krzysztof Krzywosz	Poland	17.90	q
6	Magnus Lohse	Sweden	17.35	q
7	Sami Kalliomäki	Finland	16.94	
8	Marco Di Maggio	Italy	16.72	

==== Group B ====
Rank	Name	Nationality	Result	Notes
1	Taavi Peetre	Estonia	19.47	Q
2	Georgi Ivanov	Bulgaria	18.76	Q
3	Mika Vasara	Finland	18.53	Q
4	Jakub Giża	Poland	18.26	q
5	Jaroslav Pittner	Slovakia	17.59	q
6	Philipp Barth	Germany	17.27	q
7	Lájos Tóth	Hungary	17.20	
8	Asmir Kolašinac	Serbia and Montenegro	15.66	
9	Kim Christensen	Denmark	15.64	

== Participation ==
According to an unofficial count, 17 athletes from 13 countries participated in the event.

- Bulgaria (1)
- Denmark (1)
- Estonia (1)
- Finland (2)
- Germany (2)
- Hungary (1)
- Italy (1)
- Poland (2)
- Russia (1)
- Serbia and Montenegro (2)
- Slovakia (1)
- Spain (1)
- Sweden (1)
