= Tobias Dahm =

German shot putter

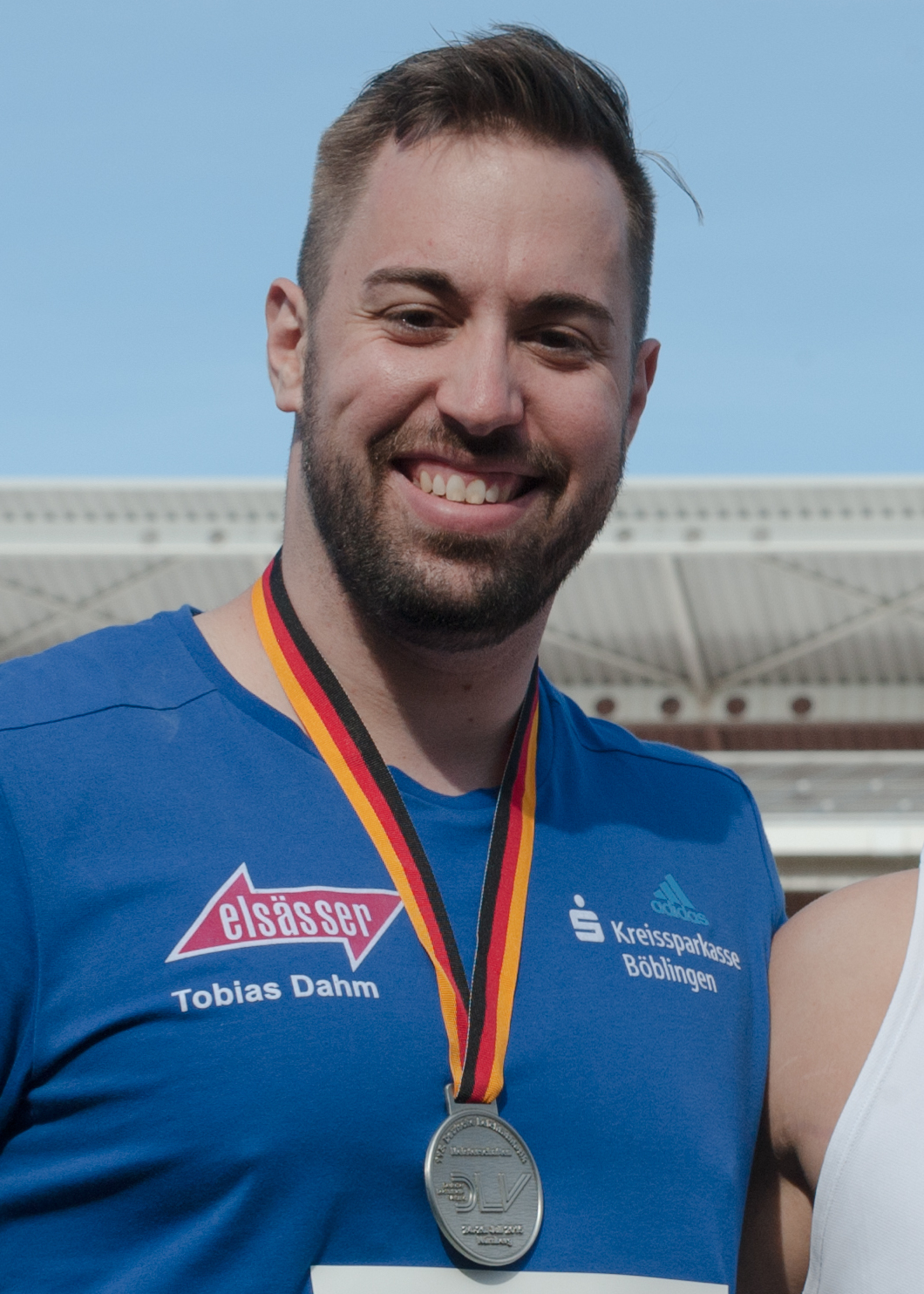

Personal information
- Born: 23 May 1987 (age 39)
- Height: 2.03 m (6 ft 8 in)
- Weight: 117 kg (258 lb)

Sport
- Sport: Athletics
- Event: Shot put
- Club: VfL Sindelfingen

Tobias Dahm (born 23 May 1987) is a German athlete specialising in the shot put. He represented his country at the 2016 World Indoor Championships finishing eighth.

His personal bests in the event are 20.38 metres outdoors (Kassel 2016) and 20.56 metres indoors (Sassnitz 2016).

== Competition record ==
Year	Competition	Venue	Position	Notes
Representing Germany
2015	European Indoor Championships	Prague, Czech Republic	8th	19.58 m
2016	World Indoor Championships	Portland, United States	8th	20.22 m
2016	European Championships	Amsterdam, Netherlands	7th	20.25 m
2016	Olympic Games	Rio de Janeiro, Brazil	22nd (q)	19.62 m
