= Soslan Tsirikhov =

Russian shot putter

Personal information
- Born: November 24, 1984 (age 41)
- Height: 1.95 m (6 ft 5 in)
- Weight: 125 kg (276 lb)

Sport
- Country: Russia
- Sport: Athletics
- Event: Shot put
- Updated on 15 August 2012

Soslan Tsirikhov (born 24 November 1984) is a Russian athlete specializing in the shot put. He represented Russia at the 2012 Summer Olympics failing to qualify for the final.

== Competition record ==
Year	Competition	Venue	Position	Notes
Representing Russia
2007	European Indoor Championships	Birmingham, United Kingdom	11th (q)	19.00 m
2009	Universiade	Belgrade, Serbia	1st	19.59 m
2011	European Cup Winter Throwing	Sofia, Bulgaria	3rd	19.45 m
2011	Universiade	Shenzhen, China	2nd	19.80 m
2012	Olympic Games	London, United Kingdom	13th (q)	20.17 m
2013	World Championships	Moscow, Russia	27th (q)	18.53 m
