= 2002 World Junior Championships in Athletics – Men's shot put =

The men's shot put event at the 2002 World Junior Championships in Athletics was held in Kingston, Jamaica, at National Stadium on 16 July. A 6 kg (junior implement) shot was used.

== Medalists ==
Gold	Edis Elkasević; Croatia
Silver	Sean Shields; United States
Bronze	Mika Vasara; Finland

== Results ==
=== Final ===
16 July

Rank	Name	Nationality	Attempts						Result	Notes
Rank	Name	Nationality	1	2	3	4	5	6	Result	Notes
1st place, gold medalist(s)	Edis Elkasević	Croatia	x	20.59	x	x	20.75	21.47	21.47	
2nd place, silver medalist(s)	Sean Shields	United States	x	19.73	x	19.46	20.54	19.89	20.54	
3rd place, bronze medalist(s)	Mika Vasara	Finland	18.98	x	20.21	19.78	x	20.50	20.50	
4	Michał Hodun	Poland	20.41	20.42	x	19.91	x	x	20.42	
5	Bertrand Vili	France	19.37	19.61	20.09	20.12	x	x	20.12	
6	Dmitriy Sivakov	Belarus	18.84	19.29	18.88	19.51	19.96	19.97	19.97	
7	Yasser Ibrahim	Egypt	18.67	18.97	19.25	19.17	19.49	x	19.49	
8	Vikas Gowda	India	19.30	x	18.64	18.55	18.88	18.88	19.30	
9	Taavi Peetre	Estonia	18.72	x	18.02				18.72	
10	Khalid Habash Al-Suwaidi	Qatar	x	18.66	x				18.66	
11	Chris Meisner	Canada	17.87	18.54	x				18.54	
12	Jeremy Silverman	United States	18.38	18.29	18.38				18.38	

=== Qualifications ===
16 Jul

==== Group A ====
Rank	Name	Nationality	Attempts			Result	Notes
Rank	Name	Nationality	1	2	3	Result	Notes
1	Bertrand Vili	France	19.54	-	-	19.54	Q
2	Michał Hodun	Poland	19.24	-	-	19.24	Q
3	Vikas Gowda	India	17.85	18.02	19.05	19.05	Q
4	Jeremy Silverman	United States	18.42	x	18.77	18.77	q
5	Yasser Ibrahim	Egypt	18.19	18.70	18.05	18.70	q
6	Magnus Lohse	Sweden	17.60	17.85	17.07	17.85	
7	Anton Lyuboslavskiy	Russia	x	17.76	17.77	17.77	
8	John Meszaros	Australia	x	x	17.73	17.73	
9	Jonathan Doucette	Canada	17.30	17.31	x	17.31	
10	Gustavo de Mendonça	Brazil	x	x	17.15	17.15	
11	Georgi Ivanov	Bulgaria	x	x	17.12	17.12	
12	Vasil Najdov	North Macedonia	16.40	x	15.84	16.40	
13	Zurab Gigaia	Georgia	16.15	15.22	16.06	16.15	
14	Kimani Kirton	Jamaica	15.87	x	x	15.87	

==== Group B ====
Rank	Name	Nationality	Attempts			Result	Notes
Rank	Name	Nationality	1	2	3	Result	Notes
1	Mika Vasara	Finland	20.43	-	-	20.43	Q
2	Sean Shields	United States	20.35	-	-	20.35	Q
3	Edis Elkasević	Croatia	20.20	-	-	20.20	Q
4	Dmitriy Sivakov	Belarus	18.89	18.89	18.63	18.89	q
5	Taavi Peetre	Estonia	18.76	18.53	x	18.76	q
6	Khalid Habash Al-Suwaidi	Qatar	18.51	x	x	18.51	q
7	Chris Meisner	Canada	18.38	x	18.48	18.48	q
8	Ranvijay Singh	India	x	18.29	17.99	18.29	
9	Philipp Barth	Germany	17.89	17.87	x	17.89	
10	Paul Peulich	Australia	17.17	17.88	x	17.88	
11	Berne van den Bergh	South Africa	16.64	17.76	16.98	17.76	
12	Hwang In-Sung	South Korea	17.22	17.64	17.20	17.64	
13	Milan Jotanovic	Yugoslavia	17.38	17.45	x	17.45	
14	Sultan Al-Hebsi	Saudi Arabia	16.99	x	16.45	16.99	

== Participation ==
According to an unofficial count, 28 athletes from 24 countries participated in the event.

- Australia (2)
- Belarus (1)
- Brazil (1)
- Bulgaria (1)
- Canada (2)
- Croatia (1)
- Egypt (1)
- Estonia (1)
- Finland (1)
- France (1)
- Georgia (1)
- Germany (1)
- India (2)
- Jamaica (1)
- North Macedonia (1)
- Poland (1)
- Qatar (1)
- Russia (1)
- Saudi Arabia (1)
- South Africa (1)
- South Korea (1)
- Sweden (1)
- United States (2)
- Yugoslavia (1)
