= Luka Rujević =

Serbian shot putter (born 1985)

Luka Rujević (born 14 October 1985) is a retired Serbian shot putter.

He finished sixth at the 2004 World Junior Championships, no-marked in the final at the 2005 European U23 Championships and won the silver medal at the 2007 European U23 Championships. He also competed at the 2006 European Championships without reaching the final.

Rujević won the bronze medal in discus throw at the 2001 European Youth Olympic Festival and 2004 World Junior Championships, his only major outings in the discus event.

His personal best put was 20.46 metres, achieved in August 2009 in Sremska Mitrovica. He had 58.66 metres in the discus throw, achieved in September 2006 in Zenica.
