= 2007 European Athletics U23 Championships – Men's shot put =

The men's shot put event at the 2007 European Athletics U23 Championships was held in Debrecen, Hungary, at Gyulai István Atlétikai Stadion on 12 July.

== Medalists ==
Gold	Jakub Giża; Poland
Silver	Luka Rujević; Serbia
Bronze	Aleksandr Grekov; Russia

== Results ==
=== Final ===
12 July

Rank	Name	Nationality	Attempts						Result	Notes
Rank	Name	Nationality	1	2	3	4	5	6	Result	Notes
1st place, gold medalist(s)	Jakub Giża	Poland	19.42	19.87	19.47	19.10	x	x	19.87	
2nd place, silver medalist(s)	Luka Rujević	Serbia	19.36	x	19.55	19.28	19.46	x	19.55	
3rd place, bronze medalist(s)	Aleksandr Grekov	Russia	18.95	19.13	19.10	x	x	x	19.13	
4	Georgi Ivanov	Bulgaria	19.02	x	x	x	x	x	19.02	
5	Lajos Kürthy	Hungary	17.34	17.80	18.59	18.87	x	x	18.87	
6	Remigius Machura	Czech Republic	17.89	18.24	x	18.48	18.54	x	18.54	
7	Jan Marcell	Czech Republic	17.65	x	18.42	x	18.07	x	18.42	
8	Maksim Sidorov	Russia	18.16	x	x	x	18.24	x	18.24	
9	Viktor Samolyuk	Ukraine	17.92	17.53	17.74				17.92	
10	Daniel Anglés	Spain	17.64	17.74	17.58				17.74	
11	Viktor Páli	Hungary	16.88	17.18	x				17.18	
12	Kieren Kelly	United Kingdom	16.12	16.85	x				16.85	

=== Qualifications ===
12 July
Qualifying 17.95 or 12 best to the Final

==== Group A ====
Rank	Name	Nationality	Result	Notes
1	Daniel Anglés	Spain	18.59	Q
2	Jakub Giża	Poland	18.42	Q
3	Aleksandr Grekov	Russia	18.28	Q
4	Lajos Kürthy	Hungary	18.18	Q
5	Viktor Samolyuk	Ukraine	18.06	Q
6	Jan Marcell	Czech Republic	17.94	q
7	Viktor Páli	Hungary	17.78	q
8	Kieren Kelly	United Kingdom	17.72	q
9	Hüseyin Atıcı	Turkey	17.27	
10	Rimantas Martišauskas	Lithuania	16.38	

==== Group B ====
Rank	Name	Nationality	Result	Notes
1	Luka Rujević	Serbia	19.20	Q
2	Maksim Sidorov	Russia	18.99	Q
3	Georgi Ivanov	Bulgaria	18.26	Q
4	Remigius Machura	Czech Republic	18.19	Q
5	Andrus Niit	Estonia	17.57	
6	Piotr Golba	Poland	17.33	
7	Kemal Mešić	Bosnia and Herzegovina	17.19	
8	Piotr Radziwon	Poland	17.15	
9	Nick Petersen	Denmark	16.47	
10	Paulius Luožys	Lithuania	16.42	
	Péter Kovács	Hungary	NM	

== Participation ==
According to an unofficial count, 21 athletes from 14 countries participated in the event.

- Bosnia and Herzegovina (1)
- Bulgaria (1)
- Czech Republic (2)
- Denmark (1)
- Estonia (1)
- Hungary (3)
- Lithuania (2)
- Poland (3)
- Russia (2)
- Serbia (1)
- Spain (1)
- Turkey (1)
- Ukraine (1)
- United Kingdom (1)
