= 2015 European Athletics Indoor Championships – Men's shot put =

The men's shot put event at the 2015 European Athletics Indoor Championships was held on 5 March 2015 at 16:30 (qualification) and 6 March, 17:25 (final) local time.

== Medalists ==
Gold	Silver	Bronze
David Storl; Germany	Asmir Kolašinac; Serbia	Ladislav Prášil; Czech Republic

== Records ==
Standing records prior to the 2015 European Athletics Indoor Championships
World record	Randy Barnes (USA)	22.66	Los Angeles, United States	20 January 1989
European record	Ulf Timmermann (GDR)	22.55	Senftenberg, East Germany	11 February 1989
Championship record	Ulf Timmermann (GDR)	22.19	Liévin, France	21 February 1987
World Leading	Ryan Whiting (USA)	21.80	Łódź, Poland	17 February 2015
European Leading	David Storl (GER)	21.26	Karlsruhe, Germany	21 February 2015

== Results ==
=== Qualification ===
Qualification: Qualification Performance 20.55 (Q) or at least 8 best performers advanced to the final.

Rank	Athlete	Nationality	#1	#2	#3	Result	Note
1	David Storl	Germany	21.23			21.23	Q
2	Stipe Žunić	Croatia	20.16	20.39	20.67	20.67	Q, NR
3	Bob Bertemes	Luxembourg	20.19	20.56		20.56	Q, NR
4	Ladislav Prášil	Czech Republic	19.96	20.50	–	20.50	q
5	Konrad Bukowiecki	Poland	19.55	20.46	19.62	20.46	q, AJB
6	Asmir Kolašinac	Serbia	20.23	20.41	x	20.41	q
7	Borja Vivas	Spain	20.16	x	19.80	20.16	q
8	Tobias Dahm	Germany	19.97	x	19.50	19.97	q, PB
9	Georgi Ivanov	Bulgaria	19.34	19.31	19.95	19.95	
10	Aleksandr Lesnoy	Russia	x	19.57	19.91	19.91	
11	Gaëtan Bucki	France	19.73	19.66	x	19.73	
12	Rafał Kownatke	Poland	19.63	18.73	19.68	19.68	
13	Konstantin Lyadusov	Russia	19.61	x	x	19.61	
14	Maksim Sidorov	Russia	18.90	19.45	x	19.45	
15	Jan Marcell	Czech Republic	x	x	19.45	19.45	
16	Pavel Lyzhyn	Belarus	x	19.30	x	19.30	
17	Carlos Tobalina	Spain	x	18.94	19.18	19.18	
18	Christian Jagusch	Germany	19.11	18.98	19.06	19.11	
19	Leif Arrhenius	Sweden	x	19.07	x	19.07	
20	Kemal Mešić	Bosnia and Herzegovina	19.04	x	18.91	19.04	
21	Tumatai Dauphin	France	18.95	x	x	18.95	
22	Yioser Toledo	Spain	18.90	x	x	18.90	
23	Šarūnas Banevičius	Lithuania	17.68	18.52	18.72	18.72	
24	Lukas Weißhaidinger	Austria	18.65	18.62	18.71	18.71	
25	Daniele Secci	Italy	x	x	18.53	18.53	
26	Andrei Gag	Romania	x	18.31	18.45	18.45	
27	Kristo Galeta	Estonia	18.18	x	x	18.18	
	Hamza Alić	Bosnia and Herzegovina	x	x	x	NM	
	Arttu Kangas	Finland	x	x	x	NM	
	Matúš Olej	Slovakia	x	x	x	NM	
	Tomáš Staněk	Czech Republic	x	x	x	NM	
	Jakub Szyszkowski	Poland	x	x	x	NM	
	Māris Urtāns	Latvia	x	x	x	NM	

=== Final ===
Rank	Athlete	Nationality	#1	#2	#3	#4	#5	#6	Result	Note
1st place, gold medalist(s)	David Storl	Germany	20.56	x	21.12	x	20.92	21.23	21.23	
2nd place, silver medalist(s)	Asmir Kolašinac	Serbia	x	x	20.47	20.34	x	20.90	20.90	
3rd place, bronze medalist(s)	Ladislav Prášil	Czech Republic	20.66	x	x	x	20.26	x	20.66	SB
4	Borja Vivas	Spain	19.72	20.03	20.15	20.14	20.59	20.10	20.59	
5	Bob Bertemes	Luxembourg	19.93	x	20.32	x	20.48	x	20.48	
6	Konrad Bukowiecki	Poland	20.46	20.41	20.44	x	20.19	x	20.46	=AJB
7	Stipe Žunić	Croatia	x	19.58	20.28	x	x	x	20.28	
8	Tobias Dahm	Germany	19.58	19.43	19.36	19.21	x	x	19.58	
