= Georgi Ivanov (shot putter) =

Bulgarian shot putter

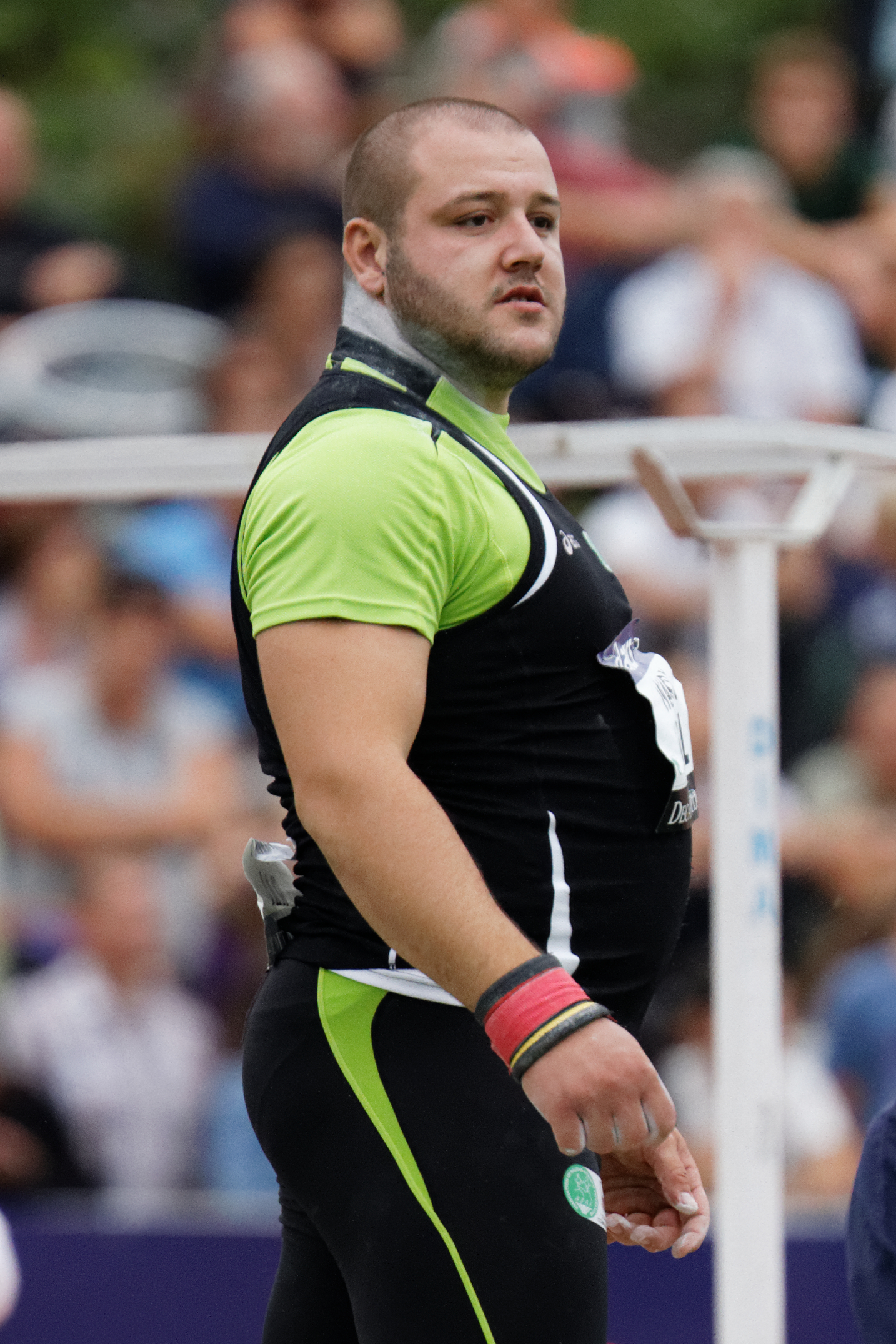
- Ivanov at the Décanation 2014

Personal information
- Born: 13 March 1985 (age 40)
- Height: 1.87 m (6 ft 2 in)
- Weight: 130 kg (287 lb)

Sport
- Country: Bulgaria
- Sport: Athletics
- Event: Shot put
- Updated on 15 August 2012

Georgi Stoyanov Ivanov (Bulgarian: Георги Стоянов Иванов; born 13 March 1985 in Sliven) is a Bulgarian shot putter. His personal best is 21.09 metres, achieved on 20 July 2013 in Ústí nad Labem.

He won the gold medals at the 2001 World Youth Championships and the 2004 World Junior Championships, and the bronze medal at the 2003 European Junior Championships. He also competed at the 2008 Olympic Games and 2012 Olympic Games without reaching the final.

== Competition record ==
Year	Competition	Venue	Position	Event	Notes
Representing Bulgaria
2001	World Youth Championships	Debrecen, Hungary	1st	Shot put (5 kg)	19.73 m
2002	World Junior Championships	Kingston, Jamaica	24th (q)	Shot put (6 kg)	17.12 m
2003	European Junior Championships	Tampere, Finland	3rd	Shot put (6 kg)	19.94 m
2004	World Junior Championships	Grosseto, Italy	1st	Shot put (6 kg)	20.70 m
2005	European U23 Championships	Erfurt, Germany	4th	Shot put	19.51 m
2007	European U23 Championships	Debrecen, Hungary	4th	Shot put	19.02 m
2008	Olympic Games	Beijing, China	–	Shot put	NM
2009	World Championships	Berlin, Germany	33rd (q)	Shot put	18.11 m
2010	European Championships	Barcelona, Spain	20th (q)	Shot put	18.28 m
2011	European Indoor Championships	Paris, France	–	Shot put	NM
2012	European Championships	Helsinki, Finland	16th (q)	Shot put	19.14 m
2012	Olympic Games	London, United Kingdom	21st (q)	Shot put	19.63 m
2013	European Indoor Championships	Gothenburg, Sweden	15th (q)	Shot put	19.52 m
2013	World Championships	Moscow, Russia	8th	Shot put	20.39 m
2014	World Indoor Championships	Sopot, Poland	5th	Shot put	21.02 m
2014	European Championships	Zürich, Switzerland	5th (q)	Shot put	20.18 m
2015	European Indoor Championships	Prague, Czech Republic	9th (q)	Shot put	19.95 m
2015	World Championships	Beijing, China	—	Shot put	NM
2016	European Championships	Amsterdam, Netherlands	–	Shot put	NM
2016	Olympic Games	Rio de Janeiro, Brazil	25th (q)	Shot put	19.49 m
2017	European Indoor Championships	Belgrade, Serbia	20th (q)	Shot put	18.94 m
2018	European Championships	Berlin, Germany	19th (q)	Shot put	19.40 m
