= Asmir Kolašinac =

Serbian shot putter (born 1984)

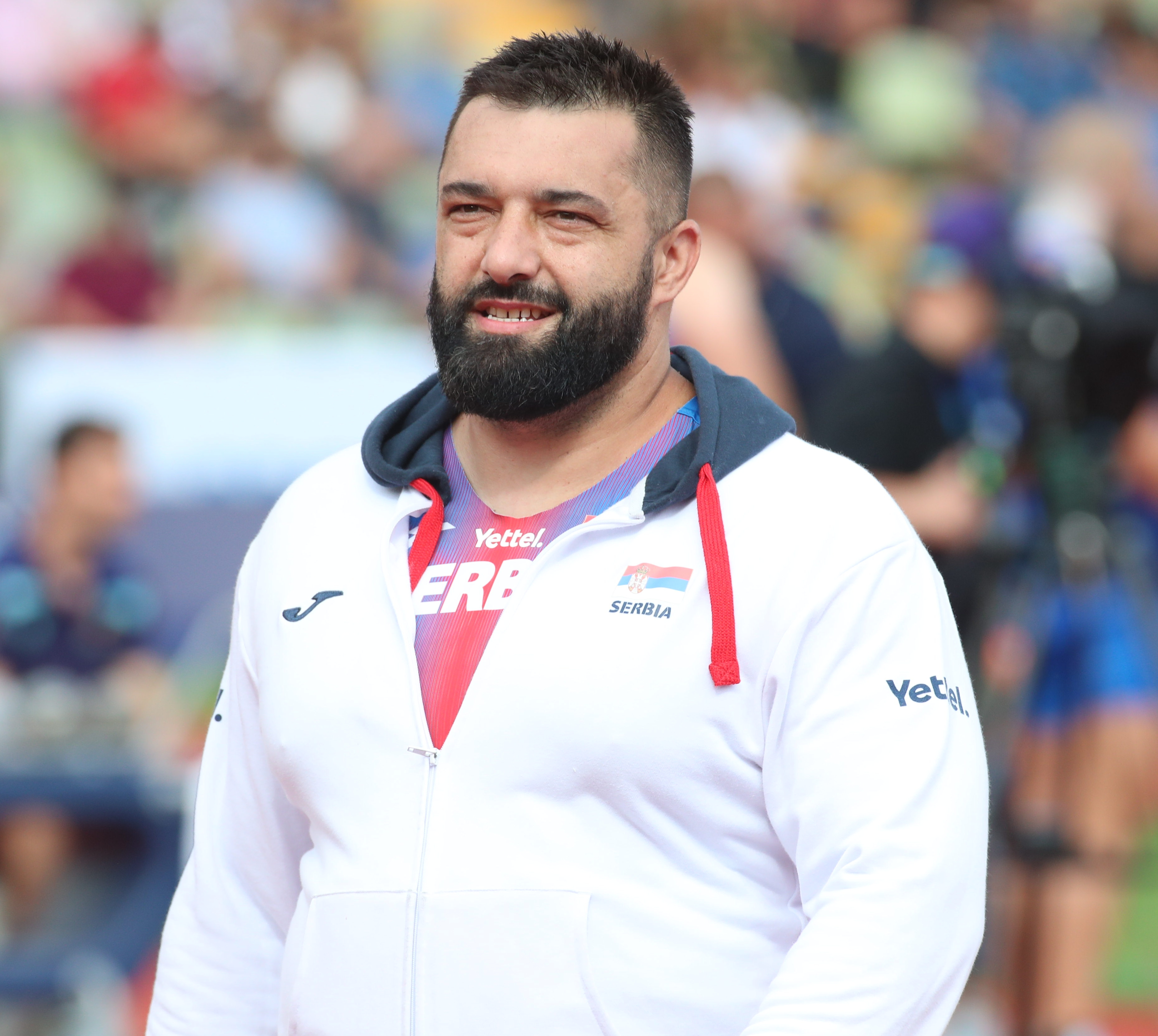
- Kolašinac at the 2022 European Championships in Munich

Personal information
- Nationality: Serbian
- Born: 15 October 1984 (age 41) Skopje, SR Macedonia, SFR Yugoslavia
- Height: 1.85 m (6 ft 1 in)
- Weight: 132 kg (291 lb)

Sport
- Country: Serbia
- Sport: Track and field
- Event: Shot put
- Club: AK Partizan

Achievements and titles
- Olympic finals: 7th - 2012 Summer Olympics
- Personal bests: Outdoor: 21.58 m Indoor: 21.06 m
Medal record
Men's athletics
Representing Serbia
European Championships
Bronze medal – third place	2012 Helsinki	Shot put
European Indoor Championships
Gold medal – first place	2013 Gothenburg	Shot put
Silver medal – second place	2015 Prague	Shot put
Mediterranean Games
Silver medal – second place	2022 Oran	Shot put

Asmir Kolašinac (Serbian Cyrillic: Асмир Колашинац; born 15 October 1984) is a Serbian shot putter who competed at the 2008 Beijing Olympics, 2012 London Olympics, 2016 Rio Olympics and 2020 Tokyo Olympics. In 2013, Kolašinac was European Indoor Champion in shot put. He is coached by Mišo Đurić and Nikola Tomasović.

== Career ==
Kolašinac was a finalist at the 2010 European Athletics Championships, where he placed ninth overall. He has competed for Serbia in indoor track and field events, including the 2010 IAAF World Indoor Championships and the 2011 European Athletics Indoor Championships. Outside of major competitions, he won gold and silver medal at the 2010 and 2012 European Cup Winter Throwing, respectively.

He achieved a personal best throw of 20.50 m in Novi Sad in June 2011, becoming the first Serbian track and field athlete to achieve the "A" Standard for the 2012 London Olympic Games. He primarily uses the spin technique. He improved his best to 20.64 m at the 2012 Gugl Indoor Meeting in Germany in February. In Olympic final he was placed 7th with a throw 20.71 m.

At the 2012 European Championship he won a bronze medal, at the 2013 European Indoor Championship he became European Champion and at the 2015 European Indoor Championship he won silver. These are the greatest achievements in his career so far.

In addition to his personal best of 21.58 m outdoors and former national record of 21.06 m indoors, he achieved a personal best throw of 63.18 m in the javelin. He ended his career at the age of 40 at the 10th Belgrade Indoor Meeting in January 2025.

== Personal life ==
Kolašinac is an ethnic Bosniak, and practising Muslim. His parents, Spaho and Muradija, lived briefly in Skopje where he was born, but then returned to their hometown of Sjenica in southwestern Serbia. He is a supporter of FK Partizan. He is currently studying at the University of Sport and Physical Education in Sarajevo.

== Statistics ==
Outdoor
Season	Performance	Place	Date
2015	21.58 m (70 ft 9 1/2 in)	Belgrade, Serbia	27 June 2015
2014	20.79 m (68 ft 2 1/2 in)	Prijepolje, Serbia	7 August 2014
2013	20.80 m (68 ft 2 3/4 in)	Belgrade, Serbia	3 August 2013
2012	20.85 m (68 ft 4 3/4 in)	Rijeka, Croatia	22 July 2012
2011	20.50 m (67 ft 3 in)	Novi Sad, Serbia	4 June 2011
2010	20.38 m (66 ft 10 1/4 in)	Bajina Basta, Serbia	8 July 2010
2009	20.41 m (66 ft 11 1/2 in)	Celje, Slovenia	2 September 2009
2008	19.99 m (65 ft 7 in)	Novi Sad, Serbia	7 June 2008
2007	19.30 m (63 ft 3 3/4 in)	Banja Luka, Bosnia	5 May 2007
2005	16.95 m (55 ft 7 1/4 in)	Leiria, Portugal	18 June 2005

Indoor
Season	Performance	Place	Date
2015	20.91 m (68 ft 7 in) (NR, EL)	Novi Sad, Serbia	15 February 2015
2014	20.67 m (67 ft 9 3/4 in) (NR)	Novi Sad, Serbia	1 March 2014
2013	20.62 m (67 ft 7 3/4 in)	Gothenburg, Sweden	1 March 2013
2012	20.64 m (67 ft 8 1/2 in) (=NR)	Linz, Austria	3 February 2012
2011	20.12 m (66 ft 0 in)	Budapest (Syma Hall), Hungary	13 February 2011
2010	20.52 m (67 ft 3 3/4 in)	Linz, Austria	4 February 2010
2009	18.88 m (61 ft 11 1/4 in)	Sarajevo, Bosnia	7 February 2009
2008	18.99 m (62 ft 3 1/2 in)	Budapest (Syma Hall), Hungary	26 January 2008

== International competitions ==
Year	Competition	Venue	Position	Notes
Representing Serbia and Montenegro
2005	European U23 Championships	Erfurt, Germany	16th (q)	15.66 m
Representing Serbia
2007	Universiade	Bangkok, Thailand	6th	18.90 m
2008	Olympic Games	Beijing, China	33rd (q)	19.01 m
2009	Universiade	Belgrade, Serbia	–	NM
2009	World Championships	Berlin, Germany	21st (q)	19.67 m
2010	World Indoor Championships	Doha, Qatar	9th (q)	20.10 m
2010	European Cup Winter Throwing	Arles, France	1st	20.15 m
2010	European Team Championships — 2nd League	Belgrade, Serbia	2nd	20.20 m
2010	European Championships	Barcelona, Spain	8th	19.77 m
2011	European Indoor Championships	Paris, France	– (q)	NM
2011	European Team Championships — 2nd League	Novi Sad, Serbia	2nd	20.09 m
2011	World Championships	Daegu, South Korea	10th	19.84 m
2012	World Indoor Championships	Istanbul, Turkey	12th (q)	19.70 m
2012	European Cup Winter Throwing	Bar, Montenegro	2nd	20.50 m
2012	European Championships	Helsinki, Finland	3rd	20.36 m
2012	Olympic Games	London, United Kingdom	7th	20.71 m
2013	European Indoor Championships	Gothenburg, Sweden	1st	20.62 m
2013	European Team Championships — 2nd League	Kaunas, Lithuania	1st	20.37 m
2013	World Championships	Moscow, Russia	10th	19.96 m
2014	World Indoor Championships	Sopot, Poland	13th (q)	20.04 m
2014	European Team Championships — 2nd League	Riga, Latvia	1st	20.15 m
2014	European Championships	Zürich, Switzerland	5th	20.55 m
2015	European Indoor Championships	Prague, Czech Republic	2nd	20.90 m
2015	European Team Championships — 2nd League	Stara Zagora, Bulgaria	1st	20.75 m
2015	World Championships	Beijing, China	7th	20.71 m
2016	European Championships	Amsterdam, Netherlands	5th	20.43 m
2016	Olympic Games	Rio de Janeiro, Brazil	15th (q)	20.16 m
2017	European Indoor Championships	Belgrade, Serbia	11th (q)	19.96 m
2018	World Indoor Championships	Birmingham, United Kingdom	15th	19.34 m
2018	European Championships	Berlin, Germany	– (q)	NM
2019	European Indoor Championships	Glasgow, United Kingdom	13th (q)	19.82 m
2019	European Team Championships — 3rd League	Skopje, North Macedonia	1st	20.01 m
2019	World Championships	Doha, Qatar	27th (q)	19.86 m
2021	European Team Championships — 3rd League	Limassol, Cyprus	2nd	20.45 m
2021	Olympic Games	Tokyo, Japan	29th (q)	19.68 m
2022	World Indoor Championships	Belgrade, Serbia	11th	20.64 m
2022	Mediterranean Games	Oran, Algeria	2nd	20.37 m
2022	European Championships	Munich, Germany	8th	20.15 m
2023	European Indoor Championships	Istanbul, Turkey	11th (q)	19.63 m
2023	World Championships	Budapest, Hungary	19th (q)	20.01 m
2024	European Championships	Rome, Italy	18th (q)	19.19 m
