= Cory Martin =

American shot putter

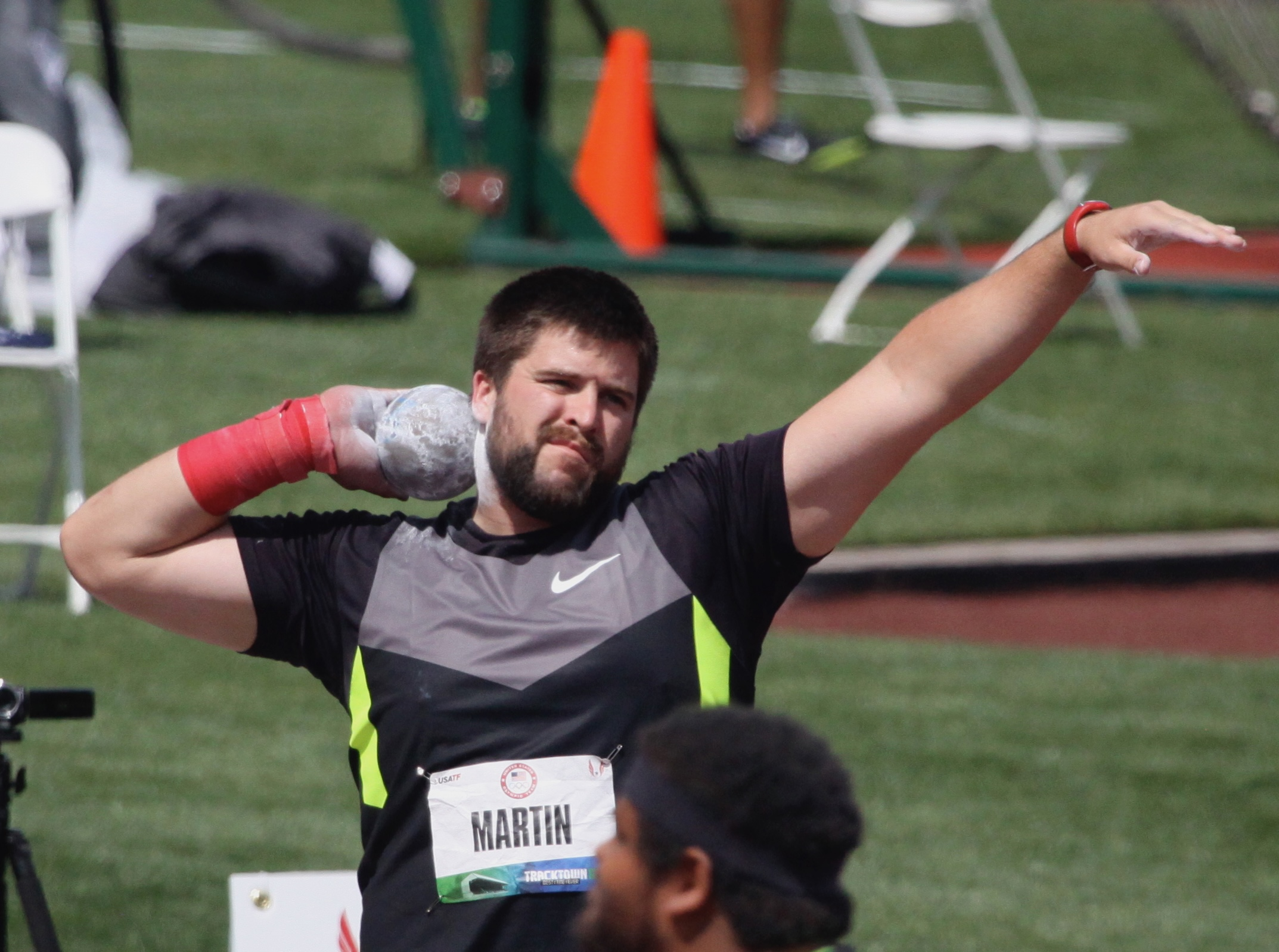

Personal information
- Born: May 22, 1985 (age 41) Bloomington, Indiana, US

Sport
- Sport: track and field
- Event: shot put

Achievements and titles
- Highest world ranking: 9th (2013 World Championships)
- Personal best: 22.10 metres (72 feet 6 inches)

Cory Martin (born May 22, 1985, in Bloomington, Indiana) is an American track and field athlete specializing in the shot put. His best international outing so far is the ninth place at the 2013 World Championships in Moscow.

His outdoor personal best of 22.10 metres (72 feet 6 inches), set in 2010 places him tied at number 21 on the world all-time list, as of 2017. His indoor personal best is 20.98 meters, set in 2013.

== Throwing career ==
Martin attended Edgewood high school. He won the 2003 IHSAA state meet in the discus. After high school he attended Auburn University where he was a nine-time All-American and two time national champion. Following his collegiate career he got sponsored by Nike in order to continue throwing competitively.

Competition results

Year	Competition	Venue	Place	Event	Mark
2004	US Junior Championships	College Station, TX	1st	Shot Put	19.79
2005	NCAA Indoor Track and Field Championships	Randal Tyson Track Center	2nd	Hammer	22.16
2007	NCAA Outdoor Track and Field Championships	Sacramento, CA	7th	Shot Put	19.08
2007	NCAA Outdoor Track and Field Championships	Sacramento, CA	3rd	Hammer	70.48
2007	USA Outdoor Track and Field Championships	Carroll Stadium	6th	Hammer	70.79
2007	NCAA Indoor Track and Field Championships	Randal Tyson Track Center	2nd	Hammer	23.27
2008	NCAA Outdoor Track and Field Championships	Drake Stadium	1st	Shot Put	20.35
2008	NCAA Outdoor Track and Field Championships	Drake Stadium	1st	Hammer	74.13
2008	USA Outdoor Track and Field Championships	Hayward Field	6th	Hammer	71.64
2009	USA Indoor Track and Field Championships	Boston, MA	4th	Shot Put	19.90
2009	USA Outdoor Track and Field Championships	Hayward Field	4th	Hammer	71.68
2010	USA Outdoor Track and Field Championships	Drake Stadium	4th	Shot Put	20.62
2010	USA Outdoor Track and Field Championships	Drake Stadium	6th	Hammer	71.63
2010	USA Indoor Track and Field Championships	Albuquerque Convention Center	3rd	Shot Put	20.60
2010	USA Indoor Track and Field Championships	Albuquerque Convention Center	2nd	Hammer	24.38
2013	USA Outdoor Track and Field Championships	Drake Stadium	4th	Shot Put	20.67
2013	USA Indoor Track and Field Championships	Albuquerque Convention Center	2nd	Shot Put	20.93

International championship results

Year	Competition	Venue	Position	Event	Notes
Representing the United States
2004	World Junior Championships	Grosseto, Italy	11th	Shot put (6 kg)	18.23 m
2004	World Junior Championships	Grosseto, Italy	15th (q)	Hammer throw (6 kg)	66.41 m
2010	World Indoor Championships	Doha, Qatar	9th (q)	Shot put	20.23 m
2010	DécaNation	Annecy, France	1st	Shot put	20.03 m
2013	World Championships	Moscow, Russia	9th	Shot put	20.09 m

== Personal life ==
Martin became the throwers coach at Indiana University in 2014.
