= Raigo Toompuu =

Estonian shot putter

Personal information
- Born: July 17, 1981 (age 44) Haapsalu, then part of Estonian SSR, Soviet Union
- Height: 1.86 m (6 ft 1 in)
- Weight: 120 kg (260 lb)

Sport
- Country: Estonia
- Sport: Athletics
- Event: Shot put
- Updated on 15 August 2012

Raigo Toompuu (born 17 July 1981) is an Estonian athlete. He competed for Estonia in shot put at the 2012 Summer Olympics.

Toompuu was an All-American thrower for the Western Kentucky Hilltoppers track and field team, finishing 5th in the discus at the 2005 NCAA Division I Outdoor Track and Field Championships.

== Competition record ==
Year	Competition	Venue	Position	Event	Result
Representing Estonia
2003	European U23 Championships	Bydgoszcz, Poland	13th (q)	Discus throw	53.27 m
2006	European Championships	Gothenburg, Sweden	16th (q)	Shot put	19.11 m
2009	European Indoor Championships	Turin, Italy	20th (q)	Shot put	18.27 m
2009	Universiade	Belgrade, Serbia	4th	Shot put	19.31 m
2012	Olympic Games	London, United Kingdom	29th (q)	Shot put	18.91 m
2013	European Indoor Championships	Gothenburg, Sweden	21st (q)	Shot put	18.28 m
