= Antonín Žalský =

Czech shot putter (born 1980)

Personal information
- Born: 7 August 1980 (age 45) Jilemnice, Czechoslovakia
- Height: 2.00 m (6 ft 7 in)
- Weight: 128 kg (282 lb)

Sport
- Country: Czech Republic
- Sport: Athletics
- Event: Shot put
- Updated on 15 August 2012

Antonín Žalský (Czech pronunciation: [ˈantoɲiːn ˈʒalskiː]; born 7 August 1980) is a Czech shot putter.

== Achievements ==
Year	Competition	Venue	Position	Event	Notes
Representing Czech Republic
1998	World Junior Championships	Annecy, France	18th (q)	Discus throw	48.53 m
1999	European Junior Championships	Riga, Latvia	5th	Discus throw	49.78
2001	European U23 Championships	Amsterdam, Netherlands	17th (q)	Shot put	17.23 m
2002	European Championships	Munich, Germany	25th (q)	Shot put	17.17
2004	Olympic Games	Athens, Greece	26th (q)	Shot put	19.09
2007	World Championships	Osaka, Japan	32nd (q)	Shot put	18.50
2009	European Team Championships	Leiria, Portugal	3rd	Shot put	20.11
2009	World Championships	Berlin, Germany	20th (q)	Shot put	19.77
2010	European Championships	Barcelona, Spain	8th	Shot put	20.01
2012	European Championships	Helsinki, Finland	6th	Shot put	19.94
2012	Olympic Games	London, United Kingdom	23rd (q)	Shot put	19.62
2013	World Championships	Moscow, Russia	11th	Shot put	19.54
