= Jakub Giża =

Polish shot putter (born 1985)

Personal information
- Nationality: Polish

Sport
- Sport: Track and field
- Event: Shot put
Medal record
European Athletics U23 Championships
Gold medal – first place	2009 Kaunas	Shot put

Jakub Giża (born 26 April 1985) is a Polish shot putter. Born in Bielawa.

== Achievements ==
Year	Competition	Venue	Position	Event	Notes
Representing Poland
2004	World Junior Championships	Grosseto, Italy	2nd	Shot put (6 kg)	20.05 m
2005	European U23 Championships	Erfurt, Germany	7th	Shot put	18.68 m
2007	European Indoor Championships	Birmingham, United Kingdom	9th (q)	Shot put	19.15 m
2007	European U23 Championships	Debrecen, Hungary	1st	Shot put	19.87 m
2010	European Championships	Barcelona, Spain	9th	Shot put	19.73 m
