= Kemal Mešić =

Bosnian athletics competitor

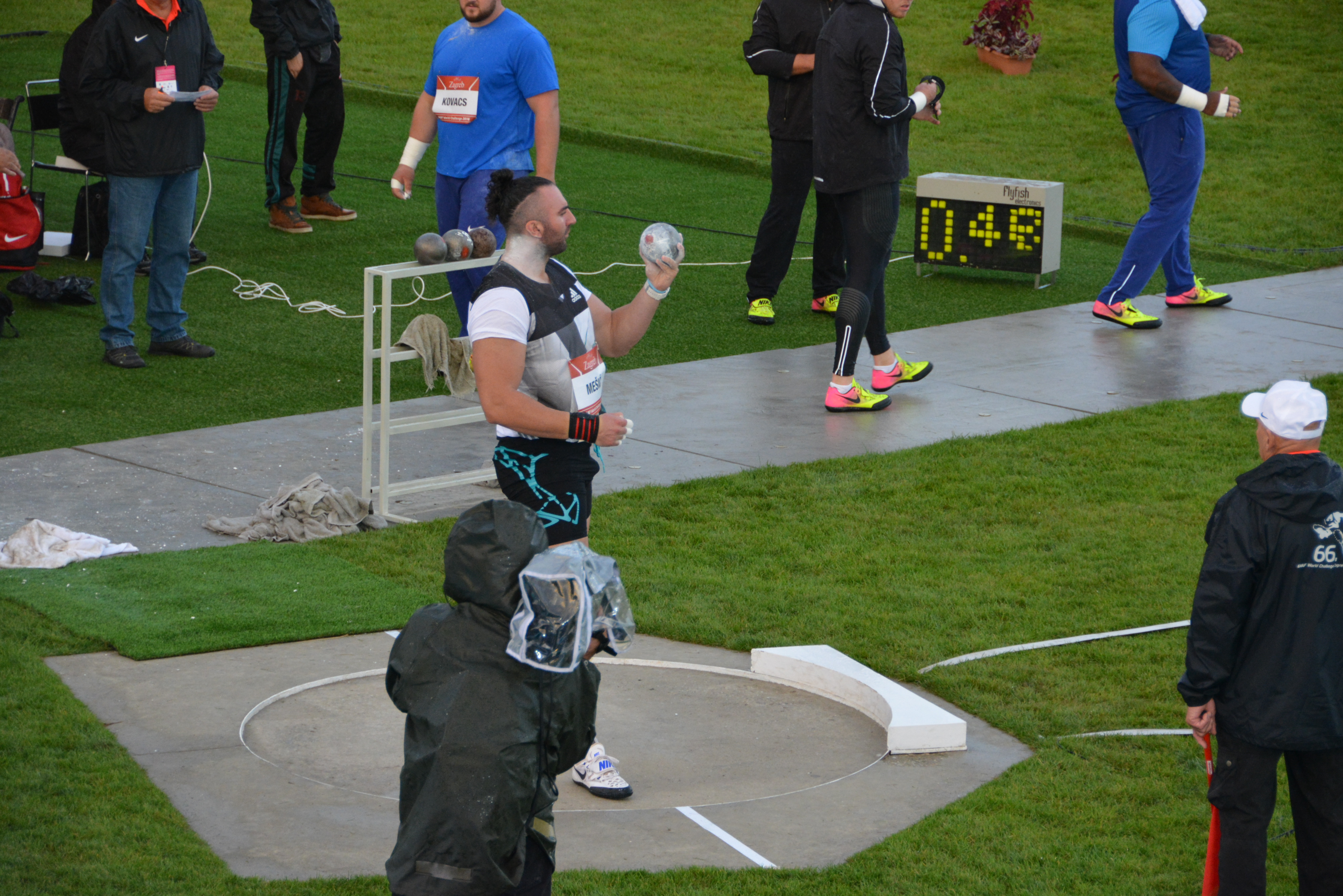
- Mešić at the 2016 Hanžeković Memorial

Personal information
- Born: 4 August 1985 (age 40) Rogatica, SR Bosnia and Herzegovina, SFR Yugoslavia
- Height: 2.00 m (6 ft 6 1/2 in)
- Weight: 125 kg (276 lb)

Sport
- Country: Bosnia and Herzegovina
- Sport: Athletics
- Event: Shot put
- Updated on 15 August 2012

Kemal Mešić (born 4 August 1985, in Rogatica) is a shot putter and discus thrower from Bosnia and Herzegovina.

Mešić competed for the Florida Gators track and field team in the NCAA.

He competed at the 2012 Olympic Games and the 2016 Olympic Games, both times without reaching the final.

His personal best throw in shot put is 20.83 meters, achieved in June 2019 in Sarajevo, Bosnia and Herzegovina, and 56.88 meters in the discus throw, achieved in May 2009 in Tallahassee, Florida.

== Competition record ==
Year	Competition	Venue	Position	Event	Notes
Representing Bosnia and Herzegovina
2004	World Junior Championships	Grosseto, Italy	25th (q)	Discus (1.75 kg)	49.06 m
2005	European U23 Championships	Erfurt, Germany	22nd (q)	Discus	48.36 m
2007	European U23 Championships	Debrecen, Hungary	16th (q)	Shot put	17.19 m
2007	European U23 Championships	Debrecen, Hungary	19th (q)	Discus	51.78 m
2009	Mediterranean Games	Pescara, Italy	9th	Shot put	17.96 m
2009	Universiade	Belgrade, Serbia	9th	Shot put	18.37 m
2011	Universiade	Shenzhen, China	10th	Shot put	18.66 m
2012	Olympic Games	London, United Kingdom	23rd (q)	Shot put	19.60 m
2013	European Indoor Championships	Gothenburg, Sweden	9th (q)	Shot put	19.71 m
2013	Mediterranean Games	Mersin, Turkey	4th	Shot put	19.60 m
2013	World Championships	Moscow, Russia	22nd (q)	Shot put	18.98 m
2014	World Indoor Championships	Sopot, Poland	15th (q)	Shot put	19.50 m
2014	European Championships	Zürich, Switzerland	22nd (q)	Shot put	18.81 m
2015	European Indoor Championships	Prague, Czech Republic	20th (q)	Shot put	19.04 m
2016	European Championships	Amsterdam, Netherlands	–	Shot put	NM
2016	Olympic Games	Rio de Janeiro, Brazil	30th (q)	Shot put	18.78 m
2018	European Championships	Berlin, Germany	27th (q)	Shot put	18.70 m
2019	World Championships	Doha, Qatar	33rd (q)	Shot put	19.49 m
