= Nazzareno Di Marco =

Italian discus thrower

Personal information
- National team: Italy: 1 cap
- Born: 30 April 1985 (age 41) Ascoli Piceno, Italy
- Height: 1.96 m (6 ft 5 in)
- Weight: 98 kg (216 lb)

Sport
- Sport: Athletics
- Event: Discus throw
- Club: Fiamme Oro

Achievements and titles
- Personal best: Discus throw: 64.93 m (2019)

Nazzareno Di Marco (born 30 April 1985) is an Italian discus thrower.

His personal bests, 64.93 m set in 2019, at the end of the 2020 outdoor season is the 6th best all-time performance of the Italian lists and in that year it was also the 29th best result in the world top-lists.

== National titles ==
Di Marco won a national championship at individual senior level.

- Italian Winter Throwing Championships
  - Discus throw: 2021

== See also ==
- Italian all-time top lists - Discus throw
