= David Storl =

German shot putter (born 1990)

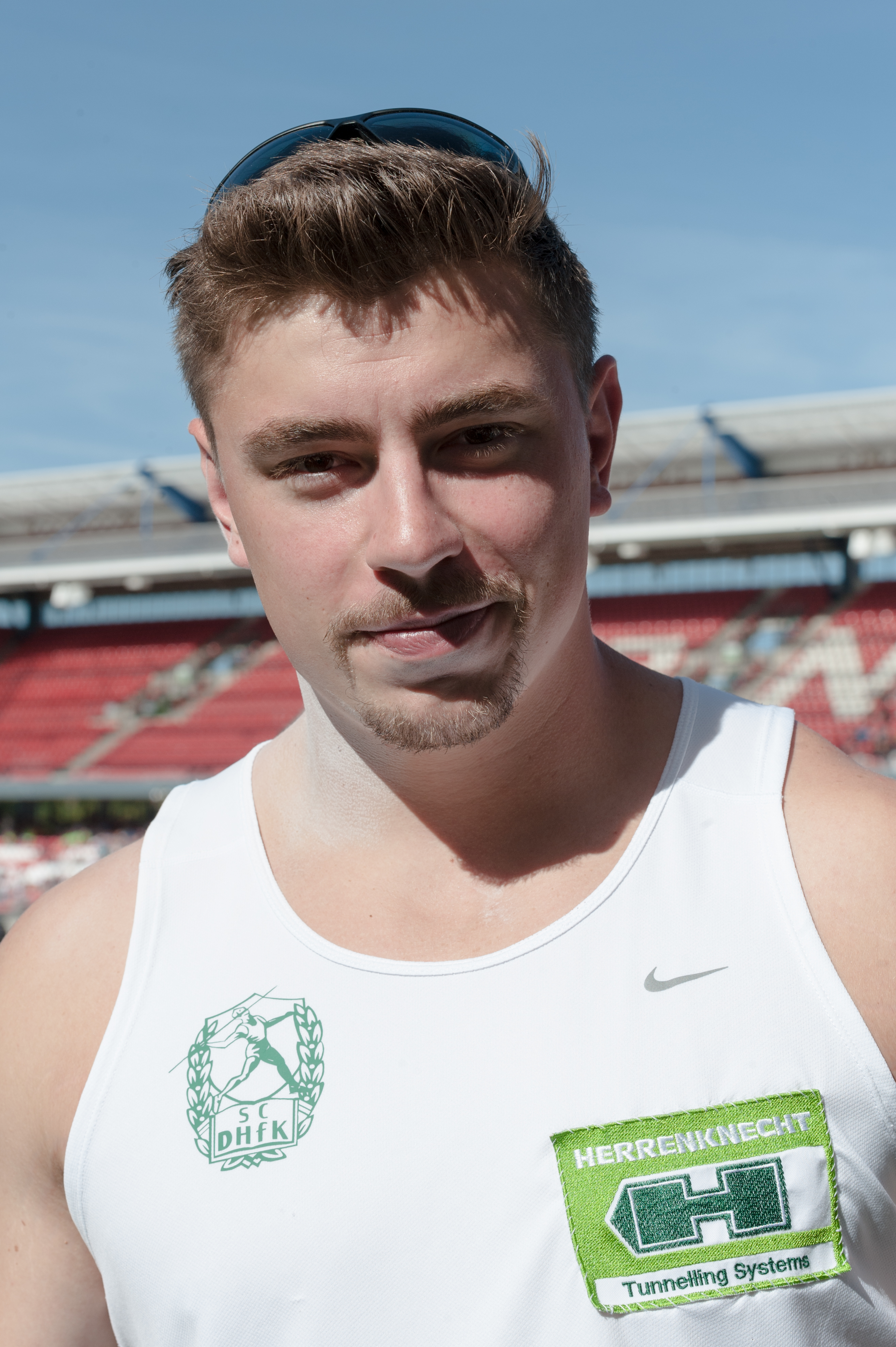
- Storl in 2015

Personal information
- Nationality: German
- Born: 27 July 1990 (age 36) Rochlitz, East Germany
- Height: 1.98 m (6 ft 6 in)
- Weight: 117 kg (258 lb)

Sport
- Country: Germany
- Sport: Track and field
- Event: Shot put
- Club: SC DHfK Leipzig
- Coached by: Sven Lang

Achievements and titles
- Personal bests: 22.20 m 22.73 m (6 kg)
Medal record
Men's athletics
Representing Germany
Event	1st	2nd	3rd
Olympic Games	0	1	0
World Championships	2	1	0
World Indoor Championships	0	3	0
European Championships	3	0	0
European Indoor Championships	1	2	1
Continental Cup	1	0	0
Junior / Youth Championships	4	0	0
Total	15	6	1
Olympic Games
Silver medal – second place	2012 London	Shot put
World Championships
Gold medal – first place	2011 Daegu	Shot put
Gold medal – first place	2013 Moscow	Shot put
Silver medal – second place	2015 Beijing	Shot put
World Indoor Championships
Silver medal – second place	2012 Istanbul	Shot put
Silver medal – second place	2014 Sopot	Shot put
Silver medal – second place	2018 Birmingham	Shot put
European Championships
Gold medal – first place	2012 Helsinki	Shot put
Gold medal – first place	2014 Zurich	Shot put
Gold medal – first place	2016 Amsterdam	Shot put
European Indoor Championships
Gold medal – first place	2015 Prague	Shot put
Silver medal – second place	2011 Paris	Shot put
Silver medal – second place	2019 Glasgow	Shot put
Bronze medal – third place	2017 Belgrade	Shot put
Continental Cup
Gold medal – first place	2014 Marrakesh	Shot put
World Junior Championships
Gold medal – first place	2008 Bydgoszcz	Shot put
World Youth Championships
Gold medal – first place	2007 Ostrava	Shot put
European U23 Championships
Gold medal – first place	2011 Ostrava	Shot put
European Junior Championships
Gold medal – first place	2009 Novi Sad	Shot put

David Storl (born 27 July 1990) is a German track and field athlete who specialises in the shot put. He was successful on the youth and junior athletics circuit, winning gold medals at the World Youth Championships and World Junior Championships. Storl won his first senior medal, a silver, at the 2011 European Athletics Indoor Championships.

He held the world junior record of 22.73 m with the 6 kg shot. His personal best with the senior implement is 22.20 m.

He won the gold medal in the shot put competition at the 2011 World Championships in Athletics, and the silver medal at the 2012 Summer Olympics.

Storl is one of only eleven athletes (along with Valerie Adams, Usain Bolt, Veronica Campbell-Brown, Armand Duplantis, Jacques Freitag, Yelena Isinbayeva, Kirani James, Faith Kipyegon, Jana Pittman, and Dani Samuels) to win World Championship titles at the youth, junior, and senior levels of an athletic event.

Storl uses the glide technique for shot putting.

== Career ==
Storl first became involved in athletics as a child when his grandfather suggested he join the local club, VfL Rochlitzer Berg. Initially a decathlon specialist, the death of his personal coach in 2006 led him to focus exclusively on the shot put and discus throwing events. At the age of 16, he won the gold medal at the 2007 World Youth Championships with a personal best and German under-18 record throw of 21.40 metres (using the lighter 5 kg shot for youths).

The following year he competed with the 6 kg junior implement and won the shot put title at the 2008 World Junior Championships in Athletics with a mark of 21.08 m, which made him the fourth-best junior of all time. In 2009, he began using the full senior weight (7.26 kg) in the indoor season and achieved a best of 19.48 m. Returning to the junior 6 kg shot in the outdoor season, he became the first ever junior athlete to throw beyond 22 metres in Mannheim, setting consecutive world junior records of 22.18 m and then 22.34 m. A month later he increased this mark to 22.73 m in Osterode (putting some distance between himself and the Edis Elkasevic's former record of 21.96 m), and went on to win the 2009 European Junior title with a championships record of 22.40 m. Having placed third at the 2009 German Athletics Championships and achieved the senior international "A" standard with a personal best throw of 20.43 m, he was selected for the 2009 World Championships in Athletics in Berlin. He ended his first senior international appearance in 15th place in the qualifying rounds.

The 2010 season was his first as a senior athlete and he was runner-up at the Indoor and Outdoor German Championships. At the 2010 IAAF World Indoor Championships, he came seventh while compatriot Ralf Bartels won the bronze. Storl represented Germany at the 2010 European Athletics Championships and managed fourth place. That year he achieved senior personal bests of 20.77 m both outdoors and indoors. He defeated Bartels to win the German indoor title in 2011, but the places were reversed at the 2011 European Athletics Indoor Championships, although Storl's silver medal was his first major senior medal.

He surpassed the 21-metre mark in Gothenburg in June with a throw of 21.03 m and topped the podium at both the 2011 European Team Championships and 2011 European Athletics U23 Championships, setting championship records of 20.81 m and 20.45 m in the process. With Bartels not competing, Storl won his first outdoor senior national title in July. He added to his best mark with a throw of 21.05 m at the Weltklasse hinterm Deich meeting.

On 12 August 2014, Storl won his second successive European Athletics Championships gold medal with a throw of 21.42m.

Storl surpassed the 22-metre mark on 9 July 2015 in Lausanne with a winning throw of 22.20m, making it his new personal best.

== Achievements ==
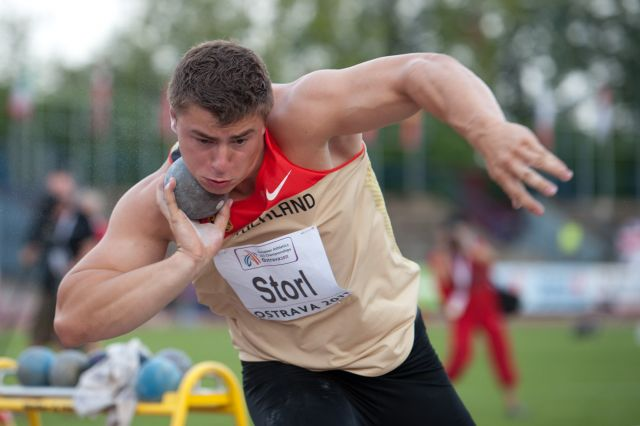
Storl at the 2011 European Athletics U23 Championships

Year	Competition	Venue	Position	Event	Notes
Representing Germany
2007	World Youth Championships	Ostrava, Czech Republic	1st	Shot put (5 kg)	21.40 m
2008	World Junior Championships	Bydgoszcz, Poland	1st	Shot put (6 kg)	21.08 m
2009	European Junior Championships	Novi Sad, Serbia	1st	Shot put (6 kg)	22.40 m
2009	World Championships	Berlin, Germany	27th (q)	Shot put	19.19 m
2010	World Indoor Championships	Doha, Qatar	7th	Shot put	20.40 m
2010	European Championships	Barcelona, Spain	4th	Shot put	20.57 m
2011	European Indoor Championships	Paris, France	2nd	Shot put	20.75 m
2011	European U23 Championships	Ostrava, Czech Republic	1st	Shot put	20.45 m
2011	World Championships	Daegu, South Korea	1st	Shot put	21.78 m
2011	DécaNation	Nice, France	1st	Shot put	20.30 m
2012	World Indoor Championships	Istanbul, Turkey	2nd	Shot put	21.88 m
2012	European Championships	Helsinki, Finland	1st	Shot put	21.58 m
2012	Olympic Games	London, United Kingdom	2nd	Shot put	21.86 m
2013	World Championships	Moscow, Russia	1st	Shot put	21.73 m
2014	World Indoor Championships	Sopot, Poland	2nd	Shot put	21.79 m
2014	European Championships	Zurich, Switzerland	1st	Shot put	21.41 m
2015	European Indoor Championships	Prague, Czech Republic	1st	Shot put	21.23 m
2015	World Championships	Beijing, China	2nd	Shot put	21.74 m
2016	European Championships	Amsterdam, Netherlands	1st	Shot put	21.31 m
2016	Olympic Games	Rio de Janeiro, Brazil	7th	Shot put	20.64 m
2017	European Indoor Championships	Belgrade, Serbia	3rd	Shot put	21.30 m
2017	World Championships	London, United Kingdom	10th	Shot put	20.80 m
2018	World Indoor Championships	Birmingham, United Kingdom	2nd	Shot put	21.44 m
2018	European Championships	Berlin, Germany	3rd	Shot put	21.41 m
2019	European Indoor Championships	Glasgow, United Kingdom	2nd	Shot put	21.54 m

Awards and achievements
Preceded by Teddy Tamgho	Men's European Athletics Rising Star of the Year; 2011	Succeeded by Pavel Maslák
