= Borja Vivas =

Spanish shot putter (born 1984)

Personal information
- Born: May 26, 1984 (age 42) Málaga, Spain
- Height: 2.04 m (6 ft 8 1/2 in)
- Weight: 139 kg (306 lb)

Sport
- Country: Spain
- Sport: Athletics
- Event: Shot put
Medal record
Representing Spain
Men's athletics
European Championships
| Silver medal – second place | 2014 Zürich | Shot put |
European Cup Winter Throwing
| Gold medal – first place | 2013 Leiria | Shot put |
Mediterranean Games
| Gold medal – first place | 2013 Mersin | Shot put |

Borja Vivas Jiménez (born 26 May 1984) is a Spanish shot putter and politician. He represented his country at the 2012 and 2016 Summer Olympics as well as four outdoor and three indoor World Championships, in addition to multiple regional competitions. His biggest success is the silver medal at the 2014 European Championships.

== Political career ==
Vivas was part of the candidate list of the People's Party (PP) in the municipal elections of 2011 and 2015 in Málaga. On both occasions, he held the largely symbolic position of number 31, the last place on the list.

In December 2021, following his retirement from athletics, he was appointed Director of the Sports Area of the Provincial Deputation of Málaga by its president, Francisco Salado. In the 2023 Spanish local elections, he was elected as a councillor of the city of Málaga representing the People's Party. He was subsequently appointed Councillor for Sports and president of District Board No. 11, Teatinos-Universidad, in the city.

== Achievements ==
| Year | Competition | Venue | Position | Event | Notes |
Representing Spain
| 2003 | European Junior Championships | Tampere, Finland | 10th | Shot put (6 kg) | 17.86 m |
| 2004 | Ibero-American Championships | Huelva, Spain | 6th | Shot put | 17.09 m |
| 2005 | Mediterranean Games | Almería, Spain | 8th | Shot put | 17.58 m |
| 2005 | European U23 Championships | Erfurt, Germany | 8th | Shot put | 18.13 m |
| 2006 | Ibero-American Championships | Ponce, Puerto Rico | 2nd | Shot put | 18.66 m |
| 2007 | Universiade | Bangkok, Thailand | 9th | Shot put | 18.34 m |
| 2008 | Ibero-American Championships | Iquique, Chile | 1st | Shot put | 19.45 m |
| 2009 | European Indoor Championships | Turin, Italy | 19th (q) | Shot put | 18.44 m |
| 2009 | Universiade | Belgrade, Serbia | 7th | Shot put | 18.72 m |
| 2009 | World Championships | Berlin, Germany | 32nd (q) | Shot put | 18.38 m |
| 2010 | Ibero-American Championships | San Fernando, Spain | 4th | Shot put | 19.20 m |
| 2010 | European Championships | Barcelona, Spain | 10th | Shot put | 19.12 m |
| 2011 | European Indoor Championships | Paris, France | 11th (q) | Shot put | 19.40 m |
| 2011 | World Championships | Daegu, South Korea | 25th (q) | Shot put | 18.37 m |
| 2012 | World Indoor Championship | Istanbul, Turkey | 18th (q) | Shot put | 18.94 m |
| 2012 | Olympic Games | London, United Kingdom | 30th (q) | Shot put | 18.88 m |
| 2013 | European Indoor Championships | Gothenburg, Sweden | 17th (q) | Shot put | 19.30 m |
| 2013 | Mediterranean Games | Mersin, Turkey | 1st | Shot put | 19.99 m |
| 2013 | World Championships | Moscow, Russia | 23rd (q) | Shot put | 18.97 m |
| 2014 | World Indoor Championships | Sopot, Poland | 9th (q) | Shot put | 20.19 m |
| 2014 | European Championships | Zürich, Switzerland | 2nd | Shot put | 20.86 m |
| 2015 | European Indoor Championships | Prague, Czech Republic | 4th | Shot put | 20.59 m |
| 2015 | World Championships | Beijing, China | 24th (q) | Shot put | 19.28 m |
| 2016 | World Indoor Championships | Portland, United States | 11th | Shot put | 19.85 m |
| 2016 | European Championships | Amsterdam, Netherlands | 8th | Shot put | 20.16 m |
| 2016 | Olympic Games | Rio de Janeiro, Brazil | 14th (q) | Shot put | 20.25 m |
| 2017 | European Indoor Championships | Belgrade, Serbia | 9th (q) | Shot put | 19.97 m |
| 2018 | Mediterranean Games | Tarragona, Spain | 13th (q) | Shot put | 17.98 m |
