= Ronnie Buckley =

Australian discus thrower

Personal information
- Born: 15 June 1986 (age 40) Australia
- Height: 195 cm (6 ft 5 in)
- Weight: 170 kg (375 lb)

Sport
- Country: Australia
- Sport: Athletics
- Event: Discus throw

Achievements and titles
- Personal bests: Discus throw: 64.69m u17 record 1.5kg(2002) Olympic Park, Victoria; 59.66m u19/u20 records 1.75kg (2004) Box Hill, Victoria; 2kg open PB 55.51 at 18 years of age (2004)

Ronnie Buckley (born 15 June 1986) is an Australian male discus thrower, who won an individual gold medal for Australia in discus throwing at the Youth World Championships (u18) in Sherbrooke Canada (2003) he also went onto represent his home country of Australia in (2004) at the world junior (u20) world championships in Grosseto Italy the following year. Mr Buckley over his discus career broke many records that still stand to this day and can be seen in the athletics Australia and athletics Victoria records archive.
