= Lajos Kürthy =

Hungarian shot putter

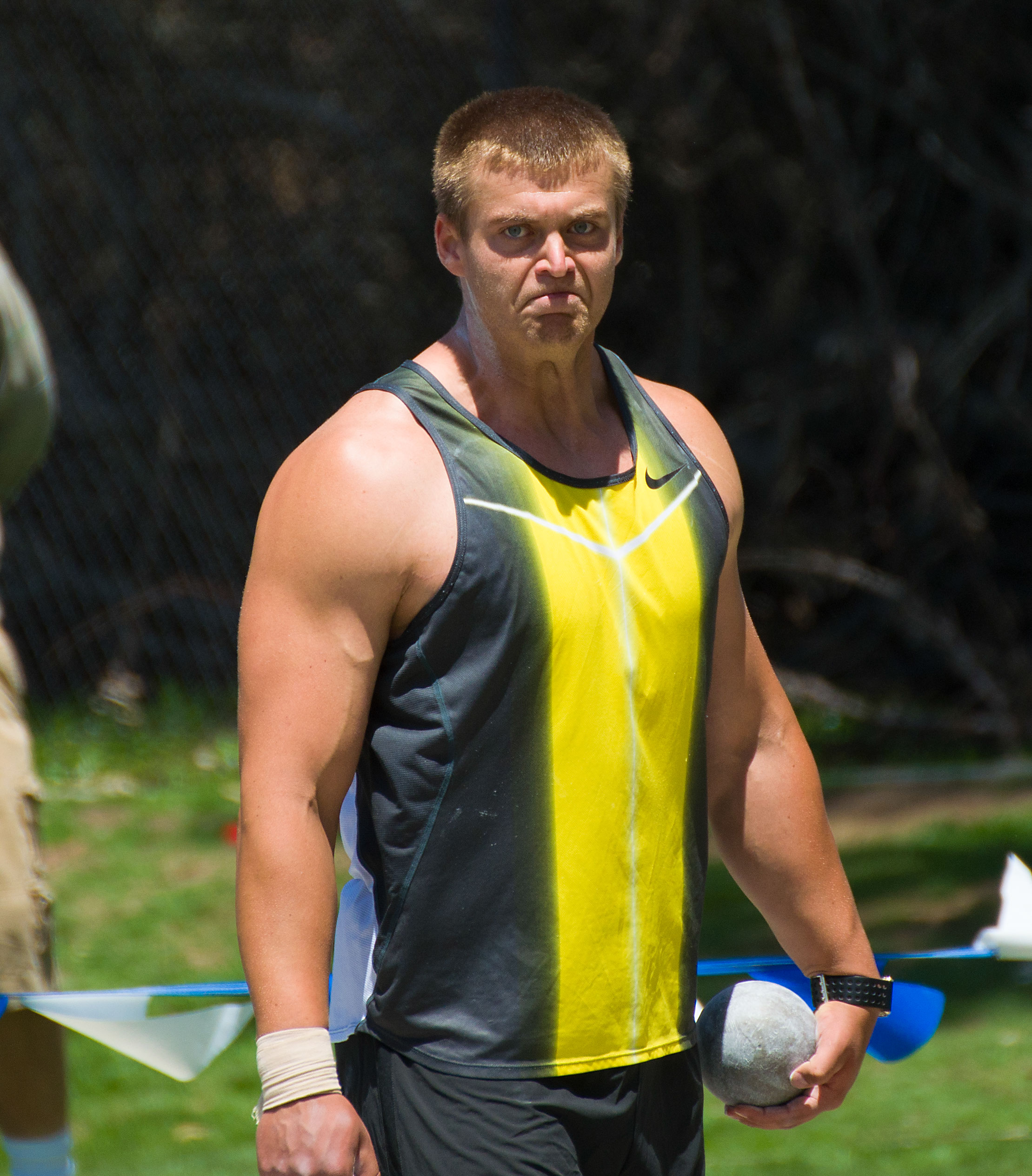
- Lajos Kürthy in 2012

Personal information
- Born: 22 October 1986 (age 38)
- Height: 1.9 m (6 ft 3 in)
- Weight: 118 kg (260 lb)

Sport
- Country: Hungary
- Sport: Athletics
- Event: Shot put
- Updated on 15 August 2012

Lajos Kürthy (Hungarian pronunciation: [ˈlɒjoʃ ˈkyrti]; born 22 October 1986) is a Hungarian shot putter. He was successful as a junior athlete, specializing in the discus throw. He later shifted to the shot put. His personal best is 20.32 metres, achieved in June 2008 in Pécs.

== Achievements ==
Year	Competition	Venue	Position	Event	Notes
Representing Hungary
2003	World Youth Championships	Sherbrooke, Canada	10th	Shot put (5 kg)	18.40 m
2003	World Youth Championships	Sherbrooke, Canada	4th	Discus (1.5 kg)	59.69 m
2004	World Junior Championships	Grosseto, Italy	18th (q)	Shot put (6 kg)	18.05 m
2004	World Junior Championships	Grosseto, Italy	12th	Discus (1.75 kg)	52.15 m
2005	European Junior Championships	Kaunas, Lithuania	2nd	Shot put (6 kg)	19.65 m
2005	European Junior Championships	Kaunas, Lithuania	2nd	Discus (1.75 kg)	59.75 m
2007	European U23 Championships	Debrecen, Hungary	5th	Shot put	18.87 m
2007	European U23 Championships	Debrecen, Hungary	9th	Discus	53.92 m
2007	World Championships	Osaka, Japan	35th (q)	Shot put	17.56 m
2009	World Championships	Berlin, Germany	22nd (q)	Shot put	19.64 m
2010	European Cup Winter Throwing	Arles, France	3rd	Shot put	20.07 m
2011	European Indoor Championships	Paris, France	18th (q)	Shot put	18.75 m
2011	World Championships	Daegu, South Korea	13th (q)	Shot put	20.02 m
2012	World Indoor Championship	Istanbul, Turkey	14th (q)	Shot put	19.62 m
2012	European Athletics Championships	Helsinki, Finland	9th (f)	Shot put	19.55 m
