= Reese Hoffa =

American shot putter (born 1977)

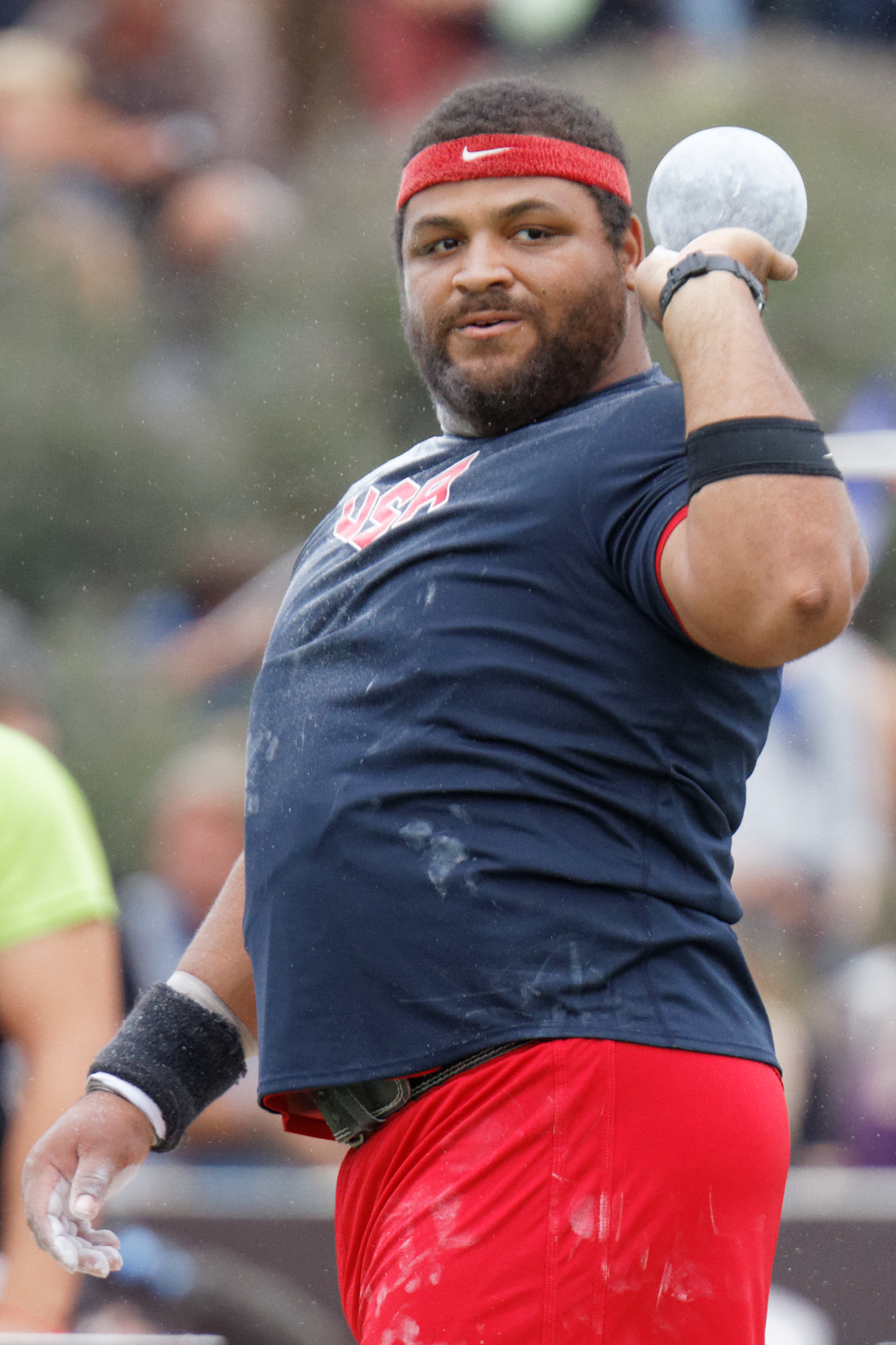
- Hoffa in 2014

Personal information
- Full name: Michael Reese Hoffa
- Nationality: American
- Born: Maurice Antawn Chism; October 8, 1977 (age 49) Evans, Georgia, U.S.
- Height: 5 ft 11 in (1.80 m)
- Weight: 147 kg (324 lb)

Sport
- Country: United States
- Sport: Athletics
- Event: Shot Put
- Club: New York Athletic Club
- Coached by: Don Babbitt

Achievements and titles
- Personal best: 22.43 m (73 ft 7 in)
Medal record
Olympic Games
Bronze medal – third place	2012 London	Shot put
World Championships
Gold medal – first place	2007 Osaka	Shot put
World Indoor Championships
Gold medal – first place	2006 Moscow	Shot put
Silver medal – second place	2004 Budapest	Shot put
Silver medal – second place	2008 Valencia	Shot put
Pan American Games
Gold medal – first place	2003 Santo Domingo	Shot put
- Updated on August 6, 2012

Michael Reese Hoffa (born Maurice Antawn Chism; October 8, 1977 in Evans, Georgia) is an American shot putter. Reese won the shot put in the 2006 World Indoor Track and Field Championships and in the 2007 World Outdoor Championships. He also won the bronze medal at the 2012 Summer Olympics in London. His personal bests stand at 22.11 m (72 ft 6 in) indoor and 22.43 m (73 ft 7 in) outdoor. In 2012, he threw over 21 meters in competition for the 100th time, putting him in rarefied air in the throwing community. Hoffa was adopted at the age of four.
