= Christian Cantwell =

American shot putter (born 1980)

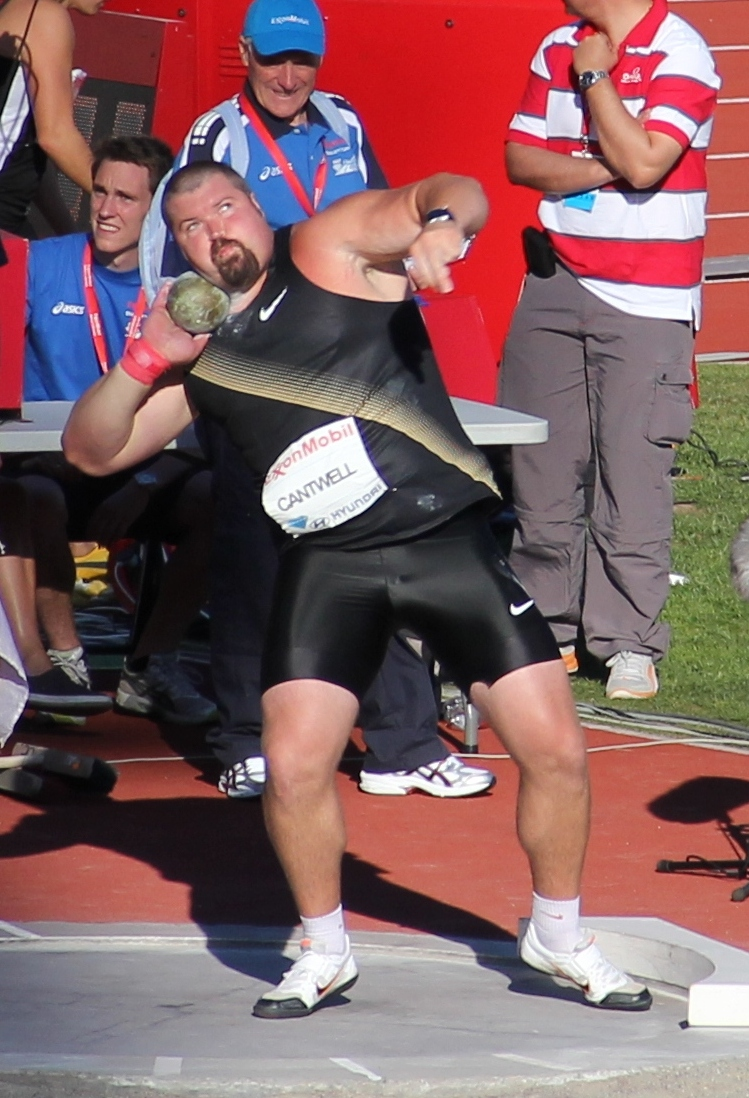
- Cantwell at the 2010 Bislett Games.

Personal information
- Born: September 30, 1980 (age 46)
- Height: 6 ft 5 in (1.96 m)
- Weight: 154 kg (340 lb)

Sport
- Country: United States
- Sport: Athletics
- Event: Shot put

Achievements and titles
- Personal bests: SP: 22.54 m (2004); DT: 59.32 m (2001)
Medal record
Summer Olympics
Silver medal – second place	2008 Beijing	Shot put
IAAF World Championships in Athletics
Gold medal – first place	2009 Berlin	Shot put
Bronze medal – third place	2011 Daegu	Shot put
World Indoor Championships
Gold medal – first place	2004 Budapest	Shot put
Gold medal – first place	2008 Valencia	Shot put
Gold medal – first place	2010 Doha	Shot put
World Athletics Final
Gold medal – first place	2003 Monte Carlo	Shot put
Gold medal – first place	2009 Thessaloniki	Shot put
Silver medal – second place	2006 Stuttgart	Shot put
Silver medal – second place	2008 Stuttgart	Shot put
Continental Cup
Gold medal – first place	2010 Split	Shot put
- Updated on August 15, 2012

Christian Cantwell (born September 30, 1980) is a World Champion American shot putter. He won a silver medal at the 2008 Summer Olympics and placed 4th at the 2012 Summer Olympics.

== Biography ==
Cantwell was born in Jefferson City, Missouri. He graduated from Eldon High School in Eldon in 1999, and the University of Missouri in 2003.

His best outdoor season was 2006, in which he had 8 of the 10 longest throws in the year. At the Berlin World Championships in 2009, he took gold with a throw of 22.03 meters. He won the gold medal at the 2010 World Indoor Championships. At the 2011 World Championships, he took bronze with a throw of 21.36.

== Personal ==
Cantwell is married to USA Olympic shot putter Teri Steer. They have one child together, Jackson Daniel Cantwell, who was born in 2008. Jackson, who attends Nixa High School in Nixa, Missouri, is a 5-star offensive tackle prospect in the class of 2026 and is ranked as the best high school shot putter in the country that is committed to play football at the University of Miami.
