= 4 × 400 meter relay at the NCAA Division I Indoor Track and Field Championships =

The 4 × 400 meter relay or its imperial 4 × 440 yard relay equivalent has been held at the NCAA Division I Indoor Track and Field Championships since its founding in 1965. The imperial distance was held until 1983, while the metric distance has been run since 1984. Hand timing was used until 1975 and in 1980, while in all other years fully automatic timing was used. In 1986 and 1987, the 1/10-mile track that the races were run on was 25 inches (640 mm) per lap short, making the actual race distance less than 400 meters those years. Official relay splits were provided by Flash Results beginning in 2008.

== Winners ==
Key
y=yards
A=Altitude assisted

Women's 4 × 440 yd relay / 4 × 400 m relay winners
Year	Athletes	Split	Team	Time	R
1983	Cathy Rattray	55.1 y	Tennessee Volunteers	3:37.08 y	
1983	Sharrieffa Barksdale	54.8 y	Tennessee Volunteers	3:37.08 y	
1983	Joetta Clark	54.2 y	Tennessee Volunteers	3:37.08 y	
1983	Delisa Walton Floyd	52.9 y	Tennessee Volunteers	3:37.08 y	
1984	Mary Bolden	55.4	Tennessee Volunteers	3:37.04	
1984	Ilrey Oliver	54.5	Tennessee Volunteers	3:37.04	
1984	Sharrieffa Barksdale	54.0	Tennessee Volunteers	3:37.04	
1984	Cathy Rattray	53.2	Tennessee Volunteers	3:37.04	
1985	Vicky Davis	55.6	Indiana Hoosiers	3:40.40	
1985	Gretchen Baker	55.5	Indiana Hoosiers	3:40.40	
1985	Adriane Diamond	54.4	Indiana Hoosiers	3:40.40	
1985	Tina Parrott	54.9	Indiana Hoosiers	3:40.40	
1986	Ilrey Oliver		Tennessee Volunteers	3:34.19	
1986	Carla McLaughlin		Tennessee Volunteers	3:34.19	
1986	Robin Benjiman		Tennessee Volunteers	3:34.19	
1986	LaVonna Martin		Tennessee Volunteers	3:34.19	
1987 (Note: Listed as Williams, Opal Cunningham, Truvillion, Wofford by the USTFCCCA archive)	Danyel Wofford	55.1	LSU Lady Tigers	3:35.49	
1987	Sylvia Brydson	53.6	LSU Lady Tigers	3:35.49	
1987	Wendy Truvillion	53.8	LSU Lady Tigers	3:35.49	
1987	Schowanda Williams	53.0	LSU Lady Tigers	3:35.49	
1988	Kellie Roberts	54.4	Texas Longhorns	3:37.19	
1988	Mary Bolden	55.8	Texas Longhorns	3:37.19	
1988	Carlette Guidry	53.3	Texas Longhorns	3:37.19	
1988	Barbara Flowers	53.7	Texas Longhorns	3:37.19	
1989	Cheryl Wilson	55.0	LSU Lady Tigers	3:33.98	
1989	Opal Cunningham	53.7	LSU Lady Tigers	3:33.98	
1989	Sylvia Byrdson	53.5	LSU Lady Tigers	3:33.98	
1989	Dawn Sowell	51.8	LSU Lady Tigers	3:33.98	
1990	Kellie Roberts	54.9	Texas Longhorns	3:32.01	
1990	Carlette Guidry	51.7	Texas Longhorns	3:32.01	
1990	Nicole Ates	53.5	Texas Longhorns	3:32.01	
1990	Sandie Richards	51.9	Texas Longhorns	3:32.01	
1991 (Note: Malone's split listed as 50.4 by The Indianapolis Star, but 50.7 by Track and Field News)	Tionette Holmes	53.9	Arizona State Sun Devils	3:32.46	
1991	Shanequa Campbell	53.4	Arizona State Sun Devils	3:32.46	
1991	Dana Jones	54.5	Arizona State Sun Devils	3:32.46	
1991	Maicel Malone	50.7	Arizona State Sun Devils	3:32.46	
1992	Nekita Beasley	54.5	Florida Gators	3:33.10	
1992	Michelle Freeman	53.5	Florida Gators	3:33.10	
1992	Kim Mitchell	53.0	Florida Gators	3:33.10	
1992	Anita Howard	52.1	Florida Gators	3:33.10	
1993	Indira Hamilton	54.9	LSU Lady Tigers	3:33.63	
1993	Dahlia Duhaney	53.5	LSU Lady Tigers	3:33.63	
1993	Heather Van Norman	53.1	LSU Lady Tigers	3:33.63	
1993	Youlanda Warren	52.1	LSU Lady Tigers	3:33.63	
1994 (Note: Listed as Shermaine Ross, Caine, Sandiford, F. Harris by the USTFCCCA archive)	Veronica Harris	55.4	Seton Hall Pirates	3:34.69	
1994	Keisha Caine	53.5	Seton Hall Pirates	3:34.69	
1994	Julia Sandiford	53.5	Seton Hall Pirates	3:34.69	
1994	Flirtisha Harris	52.3	Seton Hall Pirates	3:34.69	
1995	Zenita Davis	54.7	Texas Longhorns	3:32.17	
1995	Donna Howard	52.3	Texas Longhorns	3:32.17	
1995	Toya Brown	53.1	Texas Longhorns	3:32.17	
1995	Merlene Frazer	52.1	Texas Longhorns	3:32.17	
1996	LaTarsha Stroman	54.2	LSU Lady Tigers	3:32.53	
1996	Astia Walker	53.0	LSU Lady Tigers	3:32.53	
1996	Charlene Maulseed	53.1	LSU Lady Tigers	3:32.53	
1996	Sheila Powell	52.2	LSU Lady Tigers	3:32.53	
1997	Andrea Blackett	53.8	Rice Owls	3:34.44	
1997	Tanisha Mills	54.2	Rice Owls	3:34.44	
1997	Margaret Fox	53.6	Rice Owls	3:34.44	
1997	Melissa Stoker	52.8	Rice Owls	3:34.44	
1998	Angeline Banket	54.7	Baylor Bears	3:33.93	
1998	Alayah Cooper	53.0	Baylor Bears	3:33.93	
1998	Yulanda Nelson	54.0	Baylor Bears	3:33.93	
1998	Jennifer Jordan	52.2	Baylor Bears	3:33.93	
1999	Angel Patterson	54.0	Texas Longhorns	3:31.55	
1999	Aminah Haddad	53.3	Texas Longhorns	3:31.55	
1999	Tanya Jarrett	52.8	Texas Longhorns	3:31.55	
1999	Suziann Reid	51.5	Texas Longhorns	3:31.55	
2000	Nakiya Johnson	54.0	Texas Longhorns	3:32.56	
2000	Angel Patterson	53.1	Texas Longhorns	3:32.56	
2000	Moushaumi Robinson	52.7	Texas Longhorns	3:32.56	
2000	Tanya Jarrett	52.8	Texas Longhorns	3:32.56	
2001 (Note: Washington's split reported as 51.4 in The State)	Tacita Bass	53.6	South Carolina Gamecocks	3:30.08	
2001	Miki Barber	51.9	South Carolina Gamecocks	3:30.08	
2001	Sheneka Griffin	53.3	South Carolina Gamecocks	3:30.08	
2001	Demetria Washington	51.3	South Carolina Gamecocks	3:30.08	
2002	Tacita Bass	54.1	South Carolina Gamecocks	3:30.36	
2002	Lashinda Demus	51.7	South Carolina Gamecocks	3:30.36	
2002	Shevon Stoddart	53.3	South Carolina Gamecocks	3:30.36	
2002	Demetria Washington	51.3	South Carolina Gamecocks	3:30.36	
2003	Keasha Downer	52.8	Texas Longhorns	3:27.66	
2003	Raasin McIntosh	51.7	Texas Longhorns	3:27.66	
2003	Moushaumi Robinson	51.5	Texas Longhorns	3:27.66	
2003	Sanya Richards	51.7	Texas Longhorns	3:27.66	
2004	Raasin McIntosh	53.6	Texas Longhorns	3:28.69	
2004	Jerrika Chapple	50.9	Texas Longhorns	3:28.69	
2004	Sheretta Jones	53.0	Texas Longhorns	3:28.69	
2004	Sanya Richards	51.2	Texas Longhorns	3:28.69	
2005	Shevon Stoddart	54.0	South Carolina Gamecocks	3:30.01	
2005	Stephanie Smith	52.3	South Carolina Gamecocks	3:30.01	
2005	Tiffany Ross	51.8	South Carolina Gamecocks	3:30.01	
2005	Shalonda Solomon	51.9	South Carolina Gamecocks	3:30.01	
2006	Brooklynn Morris	52.7	LSU Lady Tigers	3:29.33	
2006	Juanita Broaddus	53.1	LSU Lady Tigers	3:29.33	
2006	Cynetheia Rooks	52.3	LSU Lady Tigers	3:29.33	
2006	Deonna Lawrence	51.2	LSU Lady Tigers	3:29.33	
2007	Stephanie Smith	53.65	South Carolina Gamecocks	3:29.57	
2007	Krystal Cantey	52.78	South Carolina Gamecocks	3:29.57	
2007	Brandi Cross	52.46	South Carolina Gamecocks	3:29.57	
2007	Natasha Hastings	50.68	South Carolina Gamecocks	3:29.57	
2008	Brooklynn Morris	54.12	LSU Lady Tigers	3:31.14	
2008	Nickiesha Wilson	52.42	LSU Lady Tigers	3:31.14	
2008	Latavia Thomas	52.63	LSU Lady Tigers	3:31.14	
2008	Deonna Lawrence	51.98	LSU Lady Tigers	3:31.14	
2009	Allison George	53.20	Texas A&M Aggies	3:32.52	
2009	Sandy Wooten	54.10	Texas A&M Aggies	3:32.52	
2009	Porscha Lucas	53.98	Texas A&M Aggies	3:32.52	
2009	Jessica Beard	51.25	Texas A&M Aggies	3:32.52	
2010	Jamesha Youngblood	54.75	Oregon Ducks	3:32.97	
2010	Keshia Baker	51.12	Oregon Ducks	3:32.97	
2010	Michele Williams	54.18	Oregon Ducks	3:32.97	
2010	Amber Purvis	52.94	Oregon Ducks	3:32.97	
2011	Jeneba Tarmoh	54.38	Texas A&M Aggies	3:29.72	
2011	Ibukun Mayungbe	51.51	Texas A&M Aggies	3:29.72	
2011	Andrea Sutherland	52.76	Texas A&M Aggies	3:29.72	
2011	Jessica Beard	51.09	Texas A&M Aggies	3:29.72	
2012	Rebecca Alexander	53.47	LSU Lady Tigers	3:31.89	
2012	Cassandra Tate	52.07	LSU Lady Tigers	3:31.89	
2012	Siedda Herbert	53.85	LSU Lady Tigers	3:31.89	
2012	Jonique Day	52.51	LSU Lady Tigers	3:31.89	
2013	English Gardner	53.64	Oregon Ducks	3:30.22	
2013	Chizoba Okodogbe	52.54	Oregon Ducks	3:30.22	
2013	Laura Roesler	52.64	Oregon Ducks	3:30.22	
2013	Phyllis Francis	51.42	Oregon Ducks	3:30.22	
2014	Chizoba Okodogbe	53.12	Oregon Ducks	3:27.40 A	
2014	Laura Roesler	51.24	Oregon Ducks	3:27.40 A	
2014	Christian Brennan	52.40	Oregon Ducks	3:27.40 A	
2014	Phyllis Francis	50.64	Oregon Ducks	3:27.40 A	
2015	Morolake Akinosun	53.99	Texas Longhorns	3:28.48	
2015	Ashley Spencer	51.25	Texas Longhorns	3:28.48	
2015	Kendall Baisden	52.88	Texas Longhorns	3:28.48	
2015	Courtney Okolo	50.36	Texas Longhorns	3:28.48	
2016	Chrisann Gordon	52.42	Texas Longhorns	3:28.27	
2016	Ariel Jones	53.02	Texas Longhorns	3:28.27	
2016	Morolake Akinosun	52.07	Texas Longhorns	3:28.27	
2016	Courtney Okolo	50.77	Texas Longhorns	3:28.27	
2017	Cameron Pettigrew	52.75	USC Trojans	3:27.03	
2017	Amalie Iuel	51.65	USC Trojans	3:27.03	
2017	Deanna Hill	51.46	USC Trojans	3:27.03	
2017	Kendall Ellis	51.18	USC Trojans	3:27.03	
2018	Kaelin Roberts	52.32	USC Trojans	3:27.45	
2018	Anna Cockrell	52.65	USC Trojans	3:27.45	
2018	Deanna Hill	51.73	USC Trojans	3:27.45	
2018	Kendall Ellis	50.75	USC Trojans	3:27.45	
2019	Stephanie Davis	53.17	South Carolina Gamecocks	3:30.76	
2019	Aliyah Abrams	51.89	South Carolina Gamecocks	3:30.76	
2019	Tatyana Mills	54.13	South Carolina Gamecocks	3:30.76	
2019	Wadeline Jonathas	51.59	South Carolina Gamecocks	3:30.76	
2021	Jania Martin	53.16	Texas A&M Aggies	3:26.68	
2021	Charokee Young	50.97	Texas A&M Aggies	3:26.68	
2021	Tierra Robinson-Jones	53.02	Texas A&M Aggies	3:26.68	
2021	Athing Mu	49.54	Texas A&M Aggies	3:26.68	
2022	Rosey Effiong	52.45	Arkansas Razorbacks	3:27.23	
2022	Jayla Hollis	52.71	Arkansas Razorbacks	3:27.23	
2022	Shafiqua Maloney	51.47	Arkansas Razorbacks	3:27.23	
2022	Britton Wilson	50.61	Arkansas Razorbacks	3:27.23	
2023	Amber Anning	51.47	Arkansas Razorbacks	3:21.75 A	
2023	Joanne Reid	50.52	Arkansas Razorbacks	3:21.75 A	
2023	Rosey Effiong	50.57	Arkansas Razorbacks	3:21.75 A	
2023	Britton Wilson	49.20	Arkansas Razorbacks	3:21.75 A	
2024	Zaya Akins	52.43	South Carolina Gamecocks	3:26.20	
2024	Jahnile Registre	51.55	South Carolina Gamecocks	3:26.20	
2024	Jayla Jamison	51.50	South Carolina Gamecocks	3:26.20	
2024	JaMeesia Ford	50.74	South Carolina Gamecocks	3:26.20	
2025	Joanne Reid	53.14	Arkansas Razorbacks	3:25.20	
2025	Sanaria Butler	51.10	Arkansas Razorbacks	3:25.20	
2025	Kaylyn Brown	51.26	Arkansas Razorbacks	3:25.20	
2025	Isabella Whittaker	49.71	Arkansas Razorbacks	3:25.20	
2026	Kaylyn Brown	52.09	Arkansas Razorbacks	3:23.63	
2026	Analisse Batista	50.73	Arkansas Razorbacks	3:23.63	
2026	Sanu Jallow-Lockhart	50.51	Arkansas Razorbacks	3:23.63	
2026	Sanaria Butler	50.31	Arkansas Razorbacks	3:23.63	

Men's 4 × 440 yd relay / 4 × 400 m relay winners
Year	Athletes	Split	Team	Time	R.
1965	Dennis Edghill	50.4 y	Morgan State Bears	3:15.6 y	
1965	Henry Hawthorne	49.1 y	Morgan State Bears	3:15.6 y	
1965	Timothy Johnson	47.8 y	Morgan State Bears	3:15.6 y	
1965	Nick Lee	47.3 y	Morgan State Bears	3:15.6 y	
1966	Ray Pollard	49.8 y	Morgan State Bears	3:16.5 y	
1966	Herman Hawthorne	49.6 y	Morgan State Bears	3:16.5 y	
1966	Malbert Brown	48.5 y	Morgan State Bears	3:16.5 y	
1966	Howard Stanback	48.6 y	Morgan State Bears	3:16.5 y	
1967	Tommy Melton	49.4 y	Oklahoma Sooners	3:15.5 y	
1967	James Shields	49.3 y	Oklahoma Sooners	3:15.5 y	
1967	James Hardwick	48.2 y	Oklahoma Sooners	3:15.5 y	
1967	Bill Calhoun	48.6 y	Oklahoma Sooners	3:15.5 y	
1968	Hal Nichter	50.7 y	Villanova Wildcats	3:14.4 y	
1968	Hardge Davis	48.5 y	Villanova Wildcats	3:14.4 y	
1968	Ken Prince	48.6 y	Villanova Wildcats	3:14.4 y	
1968	James Swift	46.6 y	Villanova Wildcats	3:14.4 y	
1969	Gary Womble	49.8 y	Tennessee Volunteers	3:14.6 y	
1969	Larry Kelley	49.0 y	Tennessee Volunteers	3:14.6 y	
1969	Audry Hardy	48.0 y	Tennessee Volunteers	3:14.6 y	
1969	Hardee McAlhaney	47.8 y	Tennessee Volunteers	3:14.6 y	
1970	Lamotte Hyman	50.1 y	Villanova Wildcats	3:15.3 y	
1970	Greg Govan	48.6 y	Villanova Wildcats	3:15.3 y	
1970	Hardge Davis	49.0 y	Villanova Wildcats	3:15.3 y	
1970	Larry James	47.6 y	Villanova Wildcats	3:15.3 y	
1971	Ray Lee		Adelphi Panthers	3:15.5 y	
1971	Keith Davis		Adelphi Panthers	3:15.5 y	
1971	Denny Walker	48.3 y	Adelphi Panthers	3:15.5 y	
1971	Clyde McPherson	48.1 y	Adelphi Panthers	3:15.5 y	
1972	Ray Lee	49.7 y	Adelphi Panthers	3:15.8 y	
1972	Keith Davis	49.0 y	Adelphi Panthers	3:15.8 y	
1972	Denny Walker	48.3 y	Adelphi Panthers	3:15.8 y	
1972	Clyde McPherson	48.8 y	Adelphi Panthers	3:15.8 y	
1973	Mike Tyson	50.9 y	Seton Hall Pirates	3:17.0 y	
1973	Larry Mustachio	49.4 y	Seton Hall Pirates	3:17.0 y	
1973	Orlando Greene	49.3 y	Seton Hall Pirates	3:17.0 y	
1973	Howard Brock	47.4 y	Seton Hall Pirates	3:17.0 y	
1974	Alfred Daley	48.7 y	Seton Hall Pirates	3:14.0 y	
1974	Charles Joseph	48.4 y	Seton Hall Pirates	3:14.0 y	
1974	Art Cooper	48.4 y	Seton Hall Pirates	3:14.0 y	
1974	Howard Brock	48.5 y	Seton Hall Pirates	3:14.0 y	
1975	Beaufort Brown	49.0 y	Florida Gators	3:15.8 y	
1975	Horace Tuitt	48.5 y	Florida Gators	3:15.8 y	
1975	Noel Gray	49.5 y	Florida Gators	3:15.8 y	
1975	Winfred Alexander	48.8 y	Florida Gators	3:15.8 y	
1976 (Note: The winning time was listed as 3:16.08 by GBR Athletics, but as 3:16.03 in contemporary reports.)	Lamar Preyor	49.8 y	Tennessee Volunteers	3:16.03 y	
1976	Mike Barlow	49.6 y	Tennessee Volunteers	3:16.03 y	
1976	Ronnie Harris	48.5 y	Tennessee Volunteers	3:16.03 y	
1976	Jerome Morgan	48.0 y	Tennessee Volunteers	3:16.03 y	
1977	Kevin Newell	49.7 y	Kansas Jayhawks	3:15.61 y	
1977	David Blutcher	49.5 y	Kansas Jayhawks	3:15.61 y	
1977	Clifford Wiley	49.9 y	Kansas Jayhawks	3:15.61 y	
1977	Jay Wagner	48.5 y	Kansas Jayhawks	3:15.61 y	
1978	Tony Husbands	49.8 y	Alabama Crimson Tide	3:15.11 y	
1978	Ike Levine	49.6 y	Alabama Crimson Tide	3:15.11 y	
1978	Darroll Gatson	48.7 y	Alabama Crimson Tide	3:15.11 y	
1978	Joe Coombs	47.0 y	Alabama Crimson Tide	3:15.11 y	
1979	Keith Brown	49.8 y	Villanova Wildcats	3:15.52 y	
1979	Derrek Harbour	49.4 y	Villanova Wildcats	3:15.52 y	
1979	Anthony Tufariello	48.0 y	Villanova Wildcats	3:15.52 y	
1979	Tim Dale	48.2 y	Villanova Wildcats	3:15.52 y	
1980 (Note: Simmons' and McCoy's splits reported as 48.3 and 47.5 respectively by the Tallahassee Democrat)	Reginald Ross	50.6 y	Florida State Seminoles	3:16.64 y	
1980	Mel Boodie	49.4 y	Florida State Seminoles	3:16.64 y	
1980	Palmer Simmons	48.7 y	Florida State Seminoles	3:16.64 y	
1980	Walter McCoy	47.7 y	Florida State Seminoles	3:16.64 y	
1981	Derrick Peynado	49.2 y	Seton Hall Pirates	3:15.91 y	
1981	Linval Francis	48.9 y	Seton Hall Pirates	3:15.91 y	
1981	Mike Paul	48.3 y	Seton Hall Pirates	3:15.91 y	
1981	Washington Njiri	49.4 y	Seton Hall Pirates	3:15.91 y	
1982	Freddie Wilson	48.5 y	Oklahoma Sooners	3:11.07 y	
1982	Donald Bly	48.0 y	Oklahoma Sooners	3:11.07 y	
1982	Coty Duling	47.2 y	Oklahoma Sooners	3:11.07 y	
1982	Dennis Carter	47.4 y	Oklahoma Sooners	3:11.07 y	
1983	Freddie Wilson	48.7 y	Oklahoma Sooners	3:11.21 y	
1983	Coty Duling	48.1 y	Oklahoma Sooners	3:11.21 y	
1983	Aubrey Jones	47.3 y	Oklahoma Sooners	3:11.21 y	
1983	Donald Bly	47.1 y	Oklahoma Sooners	3:11.21 y	
1984 (Note: Winning time listed as 3:08.56 by the USTFCCCA archive, but 3:08.55 by contemporary sources.)	Aubrey Jones	47.3	Oklahoma Sooners	3:08.55	
1984	Fonnie Kemp	46.9	Oklahoma Sooners	3:08.55	
1984	Dannie Carter	47.2	Oklahoma Sooners	3:08.55	
1984	Donald Bly	46.8	Oklahoma Sooners	3:08.55	
1985	Harold Spells	47.1	SMU Mustangs	3:08.50	
1985	Sven Nylander	48.1	SMU Mustangs	3:08.50	
1985	Kevin Robinzine	46.8	SMU Mustangs	3:08.50	
1985	Rod Jones	46.5	SMU Mustangs	3:08.50	
1986 (Note: Splits taken from Track and Field News' converted times minus 0.1 per split)	Harold Spells	48.2	SMU Mustangs	3:06.24	
1986	Roy Maritn	45.8	SMU Mustangs	3:06.24	
1986	Kevin Robinzine	46.2	SMU Mustangs	3:06.24	
1986	Rod Jones	46.3	SMU Mustangs	3:06.24	
1987	Harold Spells	48.3	SMU Mustangs	3:07.63	
1987	Roy Martin	46.2	SMU Mustangs	3:07.63	
1987	Cedric Matterson	47.6	SMU Mustangs	3:07.63	
1987	Kevin Robinzine	45.6	SMU Mustangs	3:07.63	
1988	Dennis Mitchell	47.3	Florida Gators	3:07.26	
1988	Timmy Johnson	47.2	Florida Gators	3:07.26	
1988	Calvin Long	46.4	Florida Gators	3:07.26	
1988	Mark Everett	46.4	Florida Gators	3:07.26	
1989	Calvin Long	46.2	Florida Gators	3:06.96	
1989	Earl Diamond	47.5	Florida Gators	3:06.96	
1989	Aaron Wallace	48.2	Florida Gators	3:06.96	
1989	Tyrone Kemp	45.1	Florida Gators	3:06.96	
1990	Tony Miller	48.0	Baylor Bears	3:06.49	
1990	Todd Thompson	47.2	Baylor Bears	3:06.49	
1990	Etheridge Green	46.2	Baylor Bears	3:06.49	
1990	Michael Johnson	45.1	Baylor Bears	3:06.49	
1991	Daniel Fredericks	47.5	Baylor Bears	3:07.74	
1991	Corey Williams	47.7	Baylor Bears	3:07.74	
1991	Etheridge Green	46.0	Baylor Bears	3:07.74	
1991	Tony Miller	46.5	Baylor Bears	3:07.74	
1992	Daniel Fredericks	46.6	Baylor Bears	3:04.89	
1992	Etheridge Green	45.8	Baylor Bears	3:04.89	
1992	Deon Minor	46.5	Baylor Bears	3:04.89	
1992	Corey Williams	46.0	Baylor Bears	3:04.89	
1993	Guy Robinson	47.4	Georgia Tech Yellow Jackets	3:06.23	
1993	Julian Amadee	46.4	Georgia Tech Yellow Jackets	3:06.23	
1993	Derrick Adkins	46.7	Georgia Tech Yellow Jackets	3:06.23	
1993	Derek Mills	45.7	Georgia Tech Yellow Jackets	3:06.23	
1994	Stacy Zamzow	46.6	Texas A&M Aggies	3:06.51	
1994	Mike Miller	46.7	Texas A&M Aggies	3:06.51	
1994	Dante Bolden	47.0	Texas A&M Aggies	3:06.51	
1994	Danny McCray	45.6	Texas A&M Aggies	3:06.51	
1995	Tony McCall	48.0	North Carolina Tar Heels	3:06.36	
1995	Milton Campbell	46.2	North Carolina Tar Heels	3:06.36	
1995	Henry McRoy	46.8	North Carolina Tar Heels	3:06.36	
1995	Ken Harnden	45.4	North Carolina Tar Heels	3:06.36	
1996	Roxbert Martin	46.31	Oklahoma Sooners	3:04.46	
1996	Ryan Kite	45.85	Oklahoma Sooners	3:04.46	
1996	Justin Chapman	45.57	Oklahoma Sooners	3:04.46	
1996	Danny McFarlane	45.73	Oklahoma Sooners	3:04.46	
1997	Edward Clarke	46.8	Oklahoma Sooners	3:04.25	
1997	Roxbert Martin	45.3	Oklahoma Sooners	3:04.25	
1997	Ryan Kite	46.0	Oklahoma Sooners	3:04.25	
1997	Danny McFarlane	46.1	Oklahoma Sooners	3:04.25	
1998 (Note: Mario Watts competed in the prelims. Listed as Watts, Davis, Bragner, Couts by the USTFCCCA)	Bayano Kamani	47.4	Baylor Bears	3:06.38	
1998	Damian Davis	47.4	Baylor Bears	3:06.38	
1998	Stephan Bragner	45.9	Baylor Bears	3:06.38	
1998	Brandon Couts	45.7	Baylor Bears	3:06.38	
1999	Charles Allen	47.5	Clemson Tigers	3:07.80	
1999	Kenny Franklin	47.1	Clemson Tigers	3:07.80	
1999	Davidson Gill	47.1	Clemson Tigers	3:07.80	
1999	Ato Modibo	46.1	Clemson Tigers	3:07.80	
2000	Roy Williams	46.4	TCU Horned Frogs	3:06.69	
2000	Anthony Amantine	47.7	TCU Horned Frogs	3:06.69	
2000	Kendrick Campbell	46.8	TCU Horned Frogs	3:06.69	
2000	Johnny Collins	45.8	TCU Horned Frogs	3:06.69	
2001 (Note: Listed as Colquhoun, Francique, Parham, Tunon in the 2013 NCAA Men's Indoor Championships statistics book)	Robert Parham	46.8	LSU Tigers	3:04.44	
2001	Leuroy Colquhoun	45.5	LSU Tigers	3:04.44	
2001	Pedro Tunon	47.4	LSU Tigers	3:04.44	
2001	Alleyne Francique	44.7	LSU Tigers	3:04.44	
2002 (Note: Listed as Szeglet, Sterling, Smith, Williamson in the 2013 NCAA Men's Indoor Championships statistics book. Williamson's split was reported as 45.66 in the Waco Tribune-Herald.)	Zsolt Szeglet	46.6	Baylor Bears	3:05.54	
2002	Michael Smith	45.9	Baylor Bears	3:05.54	
2002	Charles Sterling	46.6	Baylor Bears	3:05.54	
2002	Darold Williamson	46.4	Baylor Bears	3:05.54	
2003 (Note: Listed as Brazell, Coley, Greensword, Willie in the 2013 NCAA Men's Indoor Championships statistics book)	Pete Coley	46.1	LSU Tigers	3:04.79	
2003	Marlon Greensword	46.9	LSU Tigers	3:04.79	
2003	Bennie Brazell	46.2	LSU Tigers	3:04.79	
2003	Kelly Willie	45.6	LSU Tigers	3:04.79	
2004 (Note: Listed as Sazirue, Teter, Wariner, Williamson in the 2013 NCAA Men's Indoor Championships statistics book)	James Sazirue	47.2	Baylor Bears	3:03.96	
2004	Jeremy Wariner	45.4	Baylor Bears	3:03.96	
2004	Mark Teter	46.9	Baylor Bears	3:03.96	
2004	Darold Williamson	44.5	Baylor Bears	3:03.96	
2005	Sekou Clarke	46.8	Florida Gators	3:03.51	
2005	Bernard Middleton	46.1	Florida Gators	3:03.51	
2005	Stefan Pastor	45.5	Florida Gators	3:03.51	
2005	Kerron Clement	45.1	Florida Gators	3:03.51	
2006 (Note: Listed as Carter, Dardar, Rogers, Willie in the 2013 NCAA Men's Indoor Championships statistics book)	Kelly Willie	45.8	LSU Tigers	3:04.01	
2006	Reginald Dardar	46.2	LSU Tigers	3:04.01	
2006	Melville Rogers	46.1	LSU Tigers	3:04.01	
2006	Xavier Carter	45.9	LSU Tigers	3:04.01	
2007	Reggie Witherspoon	45.96	Baylor Bears	3:04.24	
2007	LeJerald Betters	45.77	Baylor Bears	3:04.24	
2007	Kevin Mutai	46.60	Baylor Bears	3:04.24	
2007	Quentin Iglehart-Summers	45.91	Baylor Bears	3:04.24	
2008	Trey Harts	47.14	Baylor Bears	3:05.66	
2008	Marcus Boyd	46.80	Baylor Bears	3:05.66	
2008	Justin Boyd	46.45	Baylor Bears	3:05.66	
2008	LeJerald Betters	45.28	Baylor Bears	3:05.66	
2009	Trey Harts	47.39	Baylor Bears	3:05.81	
2009	Marcus Boyd	46.04	Baylor Bears	3:05.81	
2009	LeJerald Betters	45.60	Baylor Bears	3:05.81	
2009	Quentin Iglehart-Summers	46.80	Baylor Bears	3:05.81	
2010	Demetrius Pinder	46.45	Texas A&M Aggies	3:04.40	
2010	Bryan Miller	46.29	Texas A&M Aggies	3:04.40	
2010	Tabarie Henry	45.76	Texas A&M Aggies	3:04.40	
2010	Curtis Mitchell	45.92	Texas A&M Aggies	3:04.40	
2011	Tran Howell	46.45	Texas A&M Aggies	3:04.24	
2011	Demetrius Pinder	44.94	Texas A&M Aggies	3:04.24	
2011	Bryan Miller	46.53	Texas A&M Aggies	3:04.24	
2011	Tabarie Henry	46.33	Texas A&M Aggies	3:04.24	
2012	Marek Niit	46.95	Arkansas Razorbacks	3:04.92	
2012	Akheem Gauntlett	46.14	Arkansas Razorbacks	3:04.92	
2012	Ben Skidmore	46.25	Arkansas Razorbacks	3:04.92	
2012	Neil Braddy	45.58	Arkansas Razorbacks	3:04.92	
2013	Marek Niit	46.26	Arkansas Razorbacks	3:03.50	
2013	Neil Braddy	46.10	Arkansas Razorbacks	3:03.50	
2013	Caleb Cross	45.88	Arkansas Razorbacks	3:03.50	
2013	Akheem Gauntlett	45.28	Arkansas Razorbacks	3:03.50	
2014	Darrell Bush	46.46	LSU Tigers	3:04.10 A	
2014	Quincy Downing	46.03	LSU Tigers	3:04.10 A	
2014	Cyril Grayson	46.57	LSU Tigers	3:04.10 A	
2014	Vernon Norwood	45.04	LSU Tigers	3:04.10 A	
2015	Gregory Coleman	46.52	Texas A&M Aggies	3:02.86	
2015	Bralon Taplin	45.12	Texas A&M Aggies	3:02.86	
2015	Shavez Hart	45.89	Texas A&M Aggies	3:02.86	
2015	Deon Lendore	45.33	Texas A&M Aggies	3:02.86	
2016	Cyril Grayson	46.93	LSU Tigers	3:04.28	
2016	Lamar Bruton	46.26	LSU Tigers	3:04.28	
2016	Michael Cherry	45.49	LSU Tigers	3:04.28	
2016	Fitzroy Dunkley	45.61	LSU Tigers	3:04.28	
2017	Fred Kerley	45.08	Texas A&M Aggies	3:02.80	
2017	Robert Grant	46.50	Texas A&M Aggies	3:02.80	
2017	Devin Dixon	45.85	Texas A&M Aggies	3:02.80	
2017	Mylik Kerley	45.39	Texas A&M Aggies	3:02.80	
2018	Zach Shinnick	46.24	USC Trojans	3:00.77	
2018	Rai Benjamin	44.35	USC Trojans	3:00.77	
2018	Ricky Morgan	45.66	USC Trojans	3:00.77	
2018	Michael Norman	44.52	USC Trojans	3:00.77	
2019	Amere Lattin	46.65	Houston Cougars	3:05.04	
2019	Obi Igbokwe	46.76	Houston Cougars	3:05.04	
2019	Jermaine Holt	46.22	Houston Cougars	3:05.04	
2019	Kahmari Montgomery	45.43	Houston Cougars	3:05.04	
2021	Randolph Ross	45.68	North Carolina A&T Aggies	3:03.16	
2021	Daniel Stokes (MEX)	46.04	North Carolina A&T Aggies	3:03.16	
2021	Elijah Young	46.78	North Carolina A&T Aggies	3:03.16	
2021	Trevor Stewart	44.67	North Carolina A&T Aggies	3:03.16	
2022	Chevannie Hanson	46.91	Texas A&M Aggies	3:04.16	
2022	Omajuwa Etiwe	46.23	Texas A&M Aggies	3:04.16	
2022	Brandon Miller	45.45	Texas A&M Aggies	3:04.16	
2022	Emmanuel Bamidele	45.58	Texas A&M Aggies	3:04.16	
2023	Connor Washington	46.48	Arkansas Razorbacks	3:02.09 A	
2023	James Benson II	44.91	Arkansas Razorbacks	3:02.09 A	
2023	Ayden Owens-Delerme	46.56	Arkansas Razorbacks	3:02.09 A	
2023	Christopher Bailey	44.15	Arkansas Razorbacks	3:02.09 A	
2024	Justin Robinson	45.73	Arizona State Sun Devils	3:02.35	
2024	Kaleb Simpson	46.18	Arizona State Sun Devils	3:02.35	
2024	Jayden Davis	45.24	Arizona State Sun Devils	3:02.35	
2024	Gamali Felix	45.21	Arizona State Sun Devils	3:02.35	
2025	Will Floyd	46.24	Georgia Bulldogs	3:03.44	
2025	Shemar Chambers	45.62	Georgia Bulldogs	3:03.44	
2025	Xai Ricks	46.04	Georgia Bulldogs	3:03.44	
2025	Ervin Pearson	45.55	Georgia Bulldogs	3:03.44	
2026	Josiah Wrice	46.28	South Carolina Gamecocks	3:02.07	
2026	Jasauna Dennis	45.48	South Carolina Gamecocks	3:02.07	
2026	Devan Crumpton	44.62	South Carolina Gamecocks	3:02.07	
2026	Andrew Salvodon	45.71	South Carolina Gamecocks	3:02.07	
