= Chima Ugwu =

Nigerian athlete (born 1973)

Medal record

Men's athletics

Representing Nigeria

African Championships
Gold medal – first place	1992 Belle Vue Harel	Shot put
Gold medal – first place	2000 Algiers	Shot put
Silver medal – second place	1989 Lagos	Shot put
Silver medal – second place	1993 Durban	Shot put
Bronze medal – third place	2000 Algiers	Discus throw
Bronze medal – third place	2006 Bambous	Discus throw

Chima Kingsley Ugwu // (born 19 July 1973 in Enugu) is a Nigerian shot putter. He also occasionally competed in discus throw.

He competed at the 1996, 2000, and 2004 Summer Olympics, and the World Championships in 1993, 1997 and 2003 without reaching the finals.

Ugwu came to the United States in 1994 and won the 1995 NJCAA outdoor shot put title while attending Central Arizona College. He was then recruited to play defensive tackle for the Arizona Wildcats football team, even though he had never played the sport before. He also won Pacific-10 Conference titles in both the shot put and discus throw.

His personal best throw is 20.26 metres, achieved in July 2000 in Lagos. This is the previous Nigerian record, and ranks him fifth in South Africans Janus Robberts, Burger Lambrechts and Karel Potgieter.

== Personal life ==
In 2017, Ugwu was indicted for attempting to ship firearms to Nigeria. Chima was arrested in 2013 not 2017. The case went to trial in 2015 when charges were dismissed.

His son, Kingsley, plays football at Kansas State.

== Competition record ==
Year	Competition	Venue	Position	Event	Notes
Representing Nigeria
1989	African Championships	Lagos, Nigeria	2nd	Shot put	16.76 m
1991	All-Africa Games	Cairo, Egypt	1st	Shot put	17.64 m
1992	African Championships	Belle Vue Harel, Mauritius	1st	Shot put	18.50 m
1993	African Championships	Durban, South Africa	2nd	Shot put	18.07 m
1993	World Championships	Stuttgart, Germany	26th (q)	Shot put	18.19 m
1994	Commonwealth Games	Victoria, Canada	3rd	Shot put	19.26 m
1995	All-Africa Games	Harare, Zimbabwe	2nd	Shot put	18.55 m
1996	Olympic Games	Atlanta, United States	25th (q)	Shot put	18.39 m
1997	World Championships	Athens, Greece	28th (q)	Shot put	18.00 m
2000	African Championships	Algiers, Algeria	1st	Shot put	19.02 m
2000	African Championships	Algiers, Algeria	3rd	Discus throw	57.91 m
2000	Olympic Games	Sydney, Australia	21st (q)	Shot put	19.11 m
2002	Commonwealth Games	Manchester, United Kingdom	5th	Shot put	18.46 m
2002	Commonwealth Games	Manchester, United Kingdom	4th	Discus throw	59.19 m
2003	World Championships	Paris, France	23rd (q)	Discus throw	58.13 m
2003	All-Africa Games	Abuja, Nigeria	2nd	Shot put	18.66 m
2003	All-Africa Games	Abuja, Nigeria	4th	Discus throw	62.26 m
2003	Afro-Asian Games	Hyderabad, India	5th	Shot put	18.42 m
2003	Afro-Asian Games	Hyderabad, India	2nd	Discus throw	59.87 m
2006	African Championships	Bambous, Mauritius	4th	Shot put	16.59 m
2006	African Championships	Bambous, Mauritius	3rd	Discus throw	51.56 m
2007	All-Africa Games	Algiers, Algeria	5th	Shot put	17.16 m
2007	All-Africa Games	Algiers, Algeria	6th	Discus throw	53.75 m
2008	African Championships	Addis Ababa, Ethiopia	6th	Shot put	15.77 m
2008	African Championships	Addis Ababa, Ethiopia	4th	Discus throw	50.84 m
