= Athletics at the 2011 All-Africa Games – Men's shot put =

The Men's Shot Put event at the 2011 All-Africa Games took place on 12 September at the Estádio Nacional do Zimpeto.

== Medalists ==
Gold	Yasser Farag Ibrahim (EGY)
Silver	Jaco Engelbrecht (RSA)
Bronze	Roelie Potgieter (RSA)

== Records ==
Prior to the competition, the established records were as follows.

World record	Randy Barnes (USA)	23.12	Westwood, United States	20 May 1990
Games record	Burger Lambrechts (RSA)	19.50	Johannesburg, South Africa	September 1999
World Leading	Dylan Armstrong (CAN)	22.21	Calgary, Canada	25 June 2011
African record	Janus Robberts (RSA)	21.97	Eugene, United States	2 June 2001

The games record was broken by gold medalist.

== Schedule ==
Date	Time	Round
September 12, 2011	17:45	Final

== Results ==
=== Final ===
Rank	Athlete	Nationality	#1	#2	#3	#4	#5	#6	Result	Notes
1st place, gold medalist(s)	Yasser Farag Ibrahim	Egypt	18.30	19.40	19.73	X	X	19.28	19.73m	GR
2nd place, silver medalist(s)	Jaco Engelbrecht	South Africa	18.41	X	18.89	X	X	18.24	18.89m	
3rd place, bronze medalist(s)	Roelie Potgieter	South Africa	17.76	17.90	18.30	18.68	X	17.99	18.68m	
4	Ross Jordaan	South Africa	17.60	X	17.19	17.87	X	18.08	18.08m	
5	Frank Elemba	Republic of the Congo	X	15.15	15.42	16.44	15.73	16.08	16.44m	
6	Moussa Diarra	Mali	15.89	16.23	16.12	15.87	X	15.91	16.23m	
7	Luccioni Mve	Gabon	X	X	14.66	15.01	X	X	15.01m	
