= 2012 African Championships in Athletics – Men's shot put =

The men's shot put at the 2012 African Championships in Athletics was held at the Stade Charles de Gaulle on 27 June.

== Medalists ==
Gold	Burger Lambrechts; South Africa
Silver	Orazio Cremona; South Africa
Bronze	Yasser Ibrahim Farag; Egypt

== Records ==
Standing records prior to the 2012 African Championships in Athletics
World record	Randy Barnes (USA)	23.12	Westwood, United States	20 May 1990
African record	Janus Robberts (RSA)	21.97	Eugene, United States	2 June 2001
Championship record	Janus Robberts (RSA)	21.02	Brazzaville, Republic of the Congo	18 July 2004

== Schedule ==
Date	Time	Round
27 June 2012	15:50	Final

== Results ==
=== Final ===
Rank	Athlete	Nationality	#1	#2	#3	#5	#5	#6	Result	Notes
1st place, gold medalist(s)	Burger Lambrechts	South Africa	19.51	19.48	x	–	–	x	19.51	
2nd place, silver medalist(s)	Orazio Cremona	South Africa	17.12	19.19	18.90	x	x	x	19.19	
3rd place, bronze medalist(s)	Yasser Ibrahim Farag	Egypt	18.71	18.17	18.78	x	x	–	18.78	
4	Jaco Engelbrecht	South Africa	17.85	17.91	x	x	x	x	17.91	
5	Franck Elemba Owaka	Republic of the Congo	x	16.12	16.19	x	16.23	x	16.23	
6	Emmanuel Asante-Ofori	Ghana	15.47	16.01	15.94	14.85	x	x	16.01	
7	Kenechukwu Ezeofor	Nigeria	15.68	15.26	15.93	x	14.70	14.69	15.93	
8	Essohounamondom Tchalim	Togo	15.34	15.63	x	15.67	14.22	14.52	15.67	
9	Lucionni Mve	Gabon	x	15.45	13.80				15.45	
10	Romainio Houndeladji	Benin	13.89	13.79	13.32				13.89	
11	Timothee Lengani	Burkina Faso	12.80	13.28	13.37				13.37	
