= Athletics at the 2007 All-Africa Games – Men's shot put =

The men's shot put at the 2007 All-Africa Games was held on July 19.

== Results ==
Rank	Athlete	Nationality	Result	Notes
1st place, gold medalist(s)	Yasser Fathy Ibrahim	Egypt	19.20	
2nd place, silver medalist(s)	Roelie Potgieter	South Africa	19.02	
3rd place, bronze medalist(s)	Mohamed Meddeb	Tunisia	17.94	
4	Ali Kamé	Madagascar	17.91	
5	Chima Ugwu	Nigeria	17.16	
6	Moussa Diarra	Mali	14.69	
