= 2004 African Championships in Athletics – Men's shot put =

The men's shot put event at the 2004 African Championships in Athletics was held in Brazzaville, Republic of the Congo on July 17.

== Results ==
| Rank | Name | Nationality | Result | Notes |
|---|---|---|---|---|
| 1st place, gold medalist(s) | Janus Robberts | South Africa | 21.02 | |
| 2nd place, silver medalist(s) | Burger Lambrechts | South Africa | 18.78 | |
| 3rd place, bronze medalist(s) | Yasser Ibrahim Farag | Egypt | 18.51 | |
| 4 | Hicham Ait Aha | Morocco | 17.37 | |
| 5 | Mohamed Meddeb | Tunisia | 16.62 | |
| 6 | Sylvestre Kamgang Simo | Cameroon | 16.14 | |
| 7 | Pedro Miguel Guimarari | Angola | 10.56 | |
