= SMU Mustangs track and field =

College track and field team

- University: Southern Methodist University
- Head coach: 'A Havahla Haynes
- Conference: ACC
- Location: University Park, Texas
- Outdoor track: Washburne Soccer and Track Stadium
- Nickname: Mustangs
- Colors: Red and blue

NCAA Indoor National Championships
- Men: 1983

NCAA Outdoor National Championships
- Men: 1983, 1986

The SMU Mustangs track and field team is the track and field program that represents Southern Methodist University. The Mustangs compete in NCAA Division I as a member of the Atlantic Coast Conference. The team is based in University Park, Texas at the Washburne Soccer and Track Stadium.

The program is coached by 'A Havahla Haynes. The track and field program officially encompasses four teams because the NCAA considers men's and women's indoor track and field and outdoor track and field as separate sports.

The men's teams were cut in 2004 due to budget constraints and to comply with Title IX. The cut was controversial as the team returned the defending NCAA discus champion Hannes Hopley.

== Postseason ==
As of 2024, a total of 63 men and 23 women have achieved individual first-team All-American status at the Division I men's outdoor, women's outdoor, men's indoor, or women's indoor national championships.

First team All-Americans
Team	Championships	Name	Event	Place	Ref.
Men's	1927 Outdoor	Winston Hooper	Mile run	5th	
Men's	1929 Outdoor	Marion Hammon	Javelin throw	2nd	
Men's	1930 Outdoor	Marion Hammon	Javelin throw	6th	
Men's	1951 Outdoor	Val Joe Walker	110 meters hurdles	6th	
Men's	1952 Outdoor	Val Joe Walker	110 meters hurdles	3rd	
Men's	1954 Outdoor	Don Morton	400 meters	4th	
Men's	1955 Outdoor	Don Morton	400 meters	6th	
Men's	1957 Outdoor	John Emmett	400 meters	8th	
Men's	1957 Outdoor	Don Stewart	High jump	1st	
Men's	1958 Outdoor	Don Stewart	High jump	1st	
Men's	1959 Outdoor	Don Stewart	High jump	3rd	
Men's	1960 Outdoor	Dexter Elkins	Pole vault	2nd	
Men's	1962 Outdoor	Dexter Elkins	Pole vault	1st	
Men's	1971 Outdoor	Sam Walker	Shot put	2nd	
Men's	1972 Outdoor	Sam Walker	Shot put	4th	
Men's	1973 Indoor	Sam Walker	Shot put	3rd	
Men's	1973 Outdoor	Joe Pouncy	200 meters	5th	
Men's	1973 Outdoor	Mike Rideau	4 × 100 meters relay	5th	
Men's	1973 Outdoor	Joe Pouncy	4 × 100 meters relay	5th	
Men's	1973 Outdoor	Rufus Shaw	4 × 100 meters relay	5th	
Men's	1973 Outdoor	Gene Pouncy	4 × 100 meters relay	5th	
Men's	1973 Outdoor	Sam Walker	Shot put	4th	
Men's	1974 Outdoor	Glenn Derwin	Javelin throw	3rd	
Men's	1979 Outdoor	Rob Gray	Discus throw	7th	
Men's	1980 Indoor	Mike Carter	Shot put	1st	
Men's	1980 Outdoor	Mike Carter	Shot put	1st	
Men's	1981 Indoor	Dennis Bradley	55 meters hurdles	5th	
Men's	1981 Indoor	Sammy Koskei	800 meters	1st	
Men's	1981 Indoor	Keith Connor	Long jump	6th	
Men's	1981 Indoor	Keith Connor	Triple jump	1st	
Men's	1981 Indoor	Mike Carter	Shot put	1st	
Men's	1981 Indoor	Robert Weir	Weight throw	1st	
Men's	1981 Indoor	Richard Olsen	Weight throw	2nd	
Men's	1981 Outdoor	Sammy Koskei	800 meters	1st	
Men's	1981 Outdoor	Keith Connor	Triple jump	3rd	
Men's	1981 Outdoor	Mike Carter	Shot put	1st	
Men's	1981 Outdoor	Mike Carter	Discus throw	2nd	
Men's	1981 Outdoor	Robert Weir	Discus throw	6th	
Men's	1981 Outdoor	Richard Olsen	Hammer throw	1st	
Men's	1981 Outdoor	Robert Weir	Hammer throw	2nd	
Men's	1981 Outdoor	Anders Hoff	Hammer throw	4th	
Men's	1982 Indoor	Keith Connor	Triple jump	1st	
Men's	1982 Indoor	Richard Olsen	Weight throw	2nd	
Men's	1982 Indoor	Robert Weir	Weight throw	4th	
Men's	1982 Indoor	Anders Hoff	Weight throw	5th	
Men's	1982 Outdoor	Henry Andrade	110 meters hurdles	6th	
Men's	1982 Outdoor	Keith Connor	Triple jump	1st	
Men's	1982 Outdoor	Richard Olsen	Hammer throw	1st	
Men's	1982 Outdoor	Robert Weir	Hammer throw	2nd	
Men's	1982 Outdoor	Keith Bateson	Hammer throw	7th	
Men's	1982 Outdoor	Anders Hoff	Hammer throw	8th	
Men's	1982 Outdoor	Roald Bradstock	Javelin throw	4th	
Men's	1983 Indoor	Robb Topping	800 meters	4th	
Men's	1983 Indoor	Russell Carter	4 × 400 meters relay	2nd	
Men's	1983 Indoor	Rod Jones	4 × 400 meters relay	2nd	
Men's	1983 Indoor	Russell Mitchell	4 × 400 meters relay	2nd	
Men's	1983 Indoor	Leslie Brooks	4 × 400 meters relay	2nd	
Men's	1983 Indoor	Keith Connor	Triple jump	2nd	
Men's	1983 Indoor	Mike Carter	Shot put	1st	
Men's	1983 Indoor	Robert Weir	Weight throw	1st	
Men's	1983 Indoor	Richard Olsen	Weight throw	5th	
Men's	1983 Indoor	Anders Hoff	Weight throw	6th	
Men's	1983 Outdoor	Henry Andrade	110 meters hurdles	5th	
Men's	1983 Outdoor	Sven Nylander	400 meters hurdles	1st	
Men's	1983 Outdoor	Leslie Brooks	4 × 400 meters relay	4th	
Men's	1983 Outdoor	Russell Carter	4 × 400 meters relay	4th	
Men's	1983 Outdoor	Eric Josjo	4 × 400 meters relay	4th	
Men's	1983 Outdoor	Rod Jones	4 × 400 meters relay	4th	
Men's	1983 Outdoor	Keith Connor	Triple jump	1st	
Men's	1983 Outdoor	Mike Carter	Shot put	1st	
Men's	1983 Outdoor	Robert Weir	Hammer throw	1st	
Men's	1983 Outdoor	Richard Olsen	Hammer throw	3rd	
Men's	1983 Outdoor	Roald Bradstock	Javelin throw	3rd	
Men's	1984 Indoor	Henry Andrade	55 meters hurdles	3rd	
Men's	1984 Indoor	Rick Raymond	Distance medley relay	6th	
Men's	1984 Indoor	Harold Spells	Distance medley relay	6th	
Men's	1984 Indoor	Ben Bor	Distance medley relay	6th	
Men's	1984 Indoor	Paul Rugut	Distance medley relay	6th	
Men's	1984 Indoor	Mike Carter	Shot put	1st	
Men's	1984 Indoor	Robert Weir	Weight throw	3rd	
Men's	1984 Indoor	Keith Bateson	Weight throw	4th	
Men's	1984 Outdoor	Henry Andrade	110 meters hurdles	2nd	
Men's	1984 Outdoor	Sven Nylander	400 meters hurdles	8th	
Men's	1984 Outdoor	Harold Spells	4 × 400 meters relay	7th	
Men's	1984 Outdoor	John Carter	4 × 400 meters relay	7th	
Men's	1984 Outdoor	Leslie Brooks	4 × 400 meters relay	7th	
Men's	1984 Outdoor	Rod Jones	4 × 400 meters relay	7th	
Men's	1984 Outdoor	Mike Carter	Shot put	2nd	
Men's	1984 Outdoor	Robert Weir	Discus throw	7th	
Men's	1984 Outdoor	Robert Weir	Hammer throw	3rd	
Men's	1984 Outdoor	Roald Bradstock	Javelin throw	2nd	
Men's	1985 Indoor	Henry Andrade	55 meters hurdles	1st	
Men's	1985 Indoor	Rod Jones	400 meters	5th	
Men's	1985 Indoor	Sven Nylander	4 × 400 meters relay	1st	
Men's	1985 Indoor	Harold Spells	4 × 400 meters relay	1st	
Men's	1985 Indoor	Kevin Robinzine	4 × 400 meters relay	1st	
Men's	1985 Indoor	Rod Jones	4 × 400 meters relay	1st	
Men's	1985 Indoor	Joe Phillips	Shot put	6th	
Men's	1985 Outdoor	Henry Andrade	110 meters hurdles	1st	
Men's	1985 Outdoor	Paul Rugut	1500 meters	8th	
Men's	1985 Outdoor	John Williams	Triple jump	4th	
Men's	1985 Outdoor	Vernon Samuels	Triple jump	6th	
Men's	1985 Outdoor	Sten Ekberg	Decathlon	3rd	
Men's	1986 Indoor	Roy Martin	4 × 400 meters relay	1st	
Men's	1986 Indoor	Harold Spells	4 × 400 meters relay	1st	
Men's	1986 Indoor	Kevin Robinzine	4 × 400 meters relay	1st	
Men's	1986 Indoor	Rod Jones	4 × 400 meters relay	1st	
Men's	1986 Indoor	Lars Nilsen	Shot put	3rd	
Men's	1986 Outdoor	Jon Ridgeon	110 meters hurdles	6th	
Men's	1986 Outdoor	Roy Martin	200 meters	7th	
Men's	1986 Outdoor	Kevin Robinzine	400 meters	3rd	
Men's	1986 Outdoor	Sven Nylander	400 meters hurdles	4th	
Men's	1986 Outdoor	Tommy Lovelace	4 × 100 meters relay	5th	
Men's	1986 Outdoor	Kevin Robinzine	4 × 100 meters relay	5th	
Men's	1986 Outdoor	Rod Jones	4 × 100 meters relay	5th	
Men's	1986 Outdoor	Roy Martin	4 × 100 meters relay	5th	
Men's	1986 Outdoor	Harold Spells	4 × 400 meters relay	1st	
Men's	1986 Outdoor	Rod Jones	4 × 400 meters relay	1st	
Men's	1986 Outdoor	Roy Martin	4 × 400 meters relay	1st	
Men's	1986 Outdoor	Kevin Robinzine	4 × 400 meters relay	1st	
Men's	1986 Outdoor	Greg West	Pole vault	7th	
Men's	1986 Outdoor	Vernon Samuels	Triple jump	5th	
Men's	1986 Outdoor	Lars Nilsen	Shot put	1st	
Men's	1986 Outdoor	Sten Ekberg	Decathlon	2nd	
Men's	1987 Indoor	Kevin Robinzine	500 meters	2nd	
Men's	1987 Indoor	Roy Martin	4 × 400 meters relay	1st	
Men's	1987 Indoor	Harold Spells	4 × 400 meters relay	1st	
Men's	1987 Indoor	Kevin Robinzine	4 × 400 meters relay	1st	
Men's	1987 Indoor	Cedric Matterson	4 × 400 meters relay	1st	
Men's	1987 Indoor	Greg West	Pole vault	5th	
Men's	1987 Indoor	Roy Hix	Pole vault	6th	
Men's	1987 Indoor	Vernon Samuels	Triple jump	7th	
Men's	1987 Indoor	Lars Nilsen	Shot put	1st	
Men's	1987 Outdoor	Kevin Robinzine	400 meters	4th	
Men's	1987 Outdoor	Cedric Matterson	800 meters	6th	
Men's	1987 Outdoor	Harold Spells	4 × 400 meters relay	2nd	
Men's	1987 Outdoor	Kevin Robinzine	4 × 400 meters relay	2nd	
Men's	1987 Outdoor	Cedric Matterson	4 × 400 meters relay	2nd	
Men's	1987 Outdoor	Roy Martin	4 × 400 meters relay	2nd	
Men's	1988 Indoor	Tim Gargiulo	Mile run	6th	
Men's	1988 Indoor	Simon Williams	Shot put	6th	
Men's	1988 Outdoor	Tim Gargiulo	5000 meters	8th	
Men's	1988 Outdoor	Simon Williams	Shot put	8th	
Men's	1989 Indoor	Thomas Rosvold	Weight throw	8th	
Men's	1990 Indoor	Tim Gargiulo	3000 meters	5th	
Men's	1990 Indoor	Roar Hoff	Shot put	6th	
Men's	1990 Outdoor	Tim Gargiulo	5000 meters	5th	
Men's	1990 Outdoor	Roar Hoff	Shot put	5th	
Women's	1990 Outdoor	JoAnn Hacker	Shot put	5th	
Men's	1991 Indoor	Roar Hoff	Shot put	5th	
Men's	1991 Indoor	Christophe Epalle	Weight throw	1st	
Men's	1991 Outdoor	Roar Hoff	Shot put	8th	
Men's	1991 Outdoor	Lars Sundt	Discus throw	3rd	
Men's	1991 Outdoor	Christophe Epalle	Hammer throw	1st	
Men's	1992 Indoor	Courtney Ireland	Shot put	3rd	
Women's	1992 Indoor	Joanie Hacker	Shot put	5th	
Men's	1992 Outdoor	Courtney Ireland	Shot put	6th	
Men's	1992 Outdoor	Lars Sundt	Discus throw	8th	
Men's	1992 Outdoor	Brian Murer	Hammer throw	6th	
Women's	1992 Outdoor	JoAnn Hacker	Shot put	5th	
Men's	1993 Indoor	Courtney Ireland	Shot put	2nd	
Men's	1993 Outdoor	Courtney Ireland	Shot put	3rd	
Men's	1993 Outdoor	Brian Murer	Hammer throw	5th	
Women's	1993 Outdoor	JoAnn Hacker	Shot put	5th	
Men's	1994 Indoor	Courtney Ireland	Shot put	3rd	
Men's	1994 Indoor	Brian Murer	Weight throw	2nd	
Men's	1994 Outdoor	Courtney Ireland	Shot put	4th	
Men's	1994 Outdoor	Courtney Ireland	Discus throw	3rd	
Women's	1994 Outdoor	Teri Cantwell	Shot put	7th	
Men's	1995 Indoor	Brian Murer	Weight throw	2nd	
Women's	1995 Indoor	Sabine Kreiger	High jump	8th	
Women's	1995 Indoor	Teri Cantwell	Shot put	6th	
Men's	1995 Outdoor	Alex Tammert	Discus throw	3rd	
Men's	1995 Outdoor	Brian Murer	Hammer throw	7th	
Women's	1995 Outdoor	Katie Swords	5000 meters	4th	
Women's	1995 Outdoor	Katie Swords	10,000 meters	1st	
Women's	1995 Outdoor	Teri Cantwell	Shot put	7th	
Women's	1995 Outdoor	Windy Dean	Javelin throw	3rd	
Women's	1995 Outdoor	Sabine Kreiger	Heptathlon	5th	
Women's	1996 Indoor	Katie Swords	5000 meters	8th	
Women's	1996 Indoor	Teri Cantwell	Shot put	2nd	
Men's	1996 Outdoor	Alex Tammert	Discus throw	2nd	
Men's	1996 Outdoor	Jason Tunks	Discus throw	3rd	
Men's	1996 Outdoor	Ian Winchester	Discus throw	4th	
Women's	1996 Outdoor	Katie Swords	5000 meters	2nd	
Women's	1996 Outdoor	Katie Swords	10,000 meters	1st	
Women's	1996 Outdoor	Kajsa Bergqvist	High jump	2nd	
Women's	1996 Outdoor	Teri Cantwell	Shot put	1st	
Women's	1996 Outdoor	Windy Dean	Hammer throw	5th	
Women's	1996 Outdoor	Windy Dean	Javelin throw	1st	
Women's	1997 Indoor	Marika Tuliniemi	Shot put	2nd	
Men's	1997 Outdoor	Jason Tunks	Discus throw	1st	
Men's	1997 Outdoor	Alex Tammert	Discus throw	5th	
Men's	1997 Outdoor	Xavier Tison	Hammer throw	2nd	
Men's	1997 Outdoor	Daniel Gustafsson	Javelin throw	3rd	
Women's	1997 Outdoor	Kajsa Bergqvist	High jump	1st	
Women's	1997 Outdoor	Marika Tuliniemi	Shot put	2nd	
Women's	1997 Outdoor	Windy Dean	Hammer throw	3rd	
Women's	1997 Outdoor	Windy Dean	Javelin throw	1st	
Men's	1998 Indoor	Roman Oravec	800 meters	5th	
Men's	1998 Indoor	Clyde Colenso	Mile run	6th	
Men's	1998 Indoor	Mustapha Raifak	High jump	6th	
Men's	1998 Indoor	Libor Charfreitag	Weight throw	1st	
Men's	1998 Indoor	Xavier Tison	Weight throw	6th	
Women's	1998 Indoor	Kajsa Bergqvist	High jump	2nd	
Women's	1998 Indoor	Bianca McKell	High jump	8th	
Women's	1998 Indoor	Teri Cantwell	Shot put	1st	
Women's	1998 Indoor	Marika Tuliniemi	Shot put	5th	
Men's	1998 Outdoor	Clyde Colenso	1500 meters	7th	
Men's	1998 Outdoor	Mustapha Raifak	High jump	8th	
Men's	1998 Outdoor	Libor Charfreitag	Hammer throw	1st	
Men's	1998 Outdoor	Xavier Tison	Hammer throw	4th	
Men's	1998 Outdoor	Daniel Gustafsson	Javelin throw	2nd	
Women's	1998 Outdoor	Tytti Reho	800 meters	8th	
Women's	1998 Outdoor	Kajsa Bergqvist	High jump	2nd	
Women's	1998 Outdoor	Teri Cantwell	Shot put	2nd	
Women's	1998 Outdoor	Marika Tuliniemi	Shot put	5th	
Women's	1998 Outdoor	Teri Cantwell	Discus throw	5th	
Women's	1998 Outdoor	Windy Dean	Hammer throw	3rd	
Women's	1998 Outdoor	Windy Dean	Javelin throw	1st	
Women's	1998 Outdoor	Liza Randjelovic	Javelin throw	5th	
Men's	1999 Indoor	Roman Oravec	800 meters	4th	
Men's	1999 Indoor	Clyde Colenso	Mile run	4th	
Men's	1999 Indoor	Janus Robberts	Shot put	7th	
Men's	1999 Indoor	Libor Charfreitag	Weight throw	1st	
Men's	1999 Indoor	Xavier Tison	Weight throw	7th	
Women's	1999 Indoor	Tytti Reho	800 meters	3rd	
Women's	1999 Indoor	Bianca McKell	High jump	8th	
Women's	1999 Indoor	Marika Tuliniemi	Shot put	1st	
Women's	1999 Indoor	Florence Ezeh	Weight throw	2nd	
Men's	1999 Outdoor	Roman Oravec	800 meters	3rd	
Men's	1999 Outdoor	Clyde Colenso	1500 meters	1st	
Men's	1999 Outdoor	Janus Robberts	Shot put	1st	
Men's	1999 Outdoor	Janus Robberts	Discus throw	2nd	
Men's	1999 Outdoor	Mark Simmons	Discus throw	7th	
Men's	1999 Outdoor	Libor Charfreitag	Hammer throw	3rd	
Men's	1999 Outdoor	Daniel Gustafsson	Javelin throw	5th	
Men's	1999 Outdoor	Torsten Sippel	Javelin throw	6th	
Women's	1999 Outdoor	Tytti Reho	800 meters	4th	
Women's	1999 Outdoor	Kajsa Bergqvist	High jump	1st	
Women's	1999 Outdoor	Grete Etholm	Discus throw	5th	
Women's	1999 Outdoor	Florence Ezeh	Hammer throw	1st	
Men's	2000 Indoor	Roman Oravec	800 meters	3rd	
Men's	2000 Indoor	Mustapha Raifak	High jump	5th	
Men's	2000 Indoor	Janus Robberts	Shot put	1st	
Men's	2000 Indoor	Libor Charfreitag	Weight throw	1st	
Men's	2000 Indoor	Xavier Tison	Weight throw	2nd	
Women's	2000 Indoor	Tytti Reho	800 meters	3rd	
Women's	2000 Indoor	Florence Ezeh	Weight throw	1st	
Men's	2000 Outdoor	Mustapha Raifak	High jump	7th	
Men's	2000 Outdoor	Janus Robberts	Shot put	2nd	
Men's	2000 Outdoor	Libor Charfreitag	Hammer throw	1st	
Women's	2000 Outdoor	Tytti Reho	800 meters	1st	
Women's	2000 Outdoor	Florence Ezeh	Hammer throw	1st	
Men's	2001 Indoor	Roman Oravec	800 meters	4th	
Men's	2001 Indoor	Janus Robberts	Shot put	1st	
Men's	2001 Indoor	Andrey Borodkin	Shot put	5th	
Men's	2001 Indoor	Libor Charfreitag	Weight throw	2nd	
Women's	2001 Indoor	Diana Nikitina	Triple jump	5th	
Women's	2001 Indoor	Florence Ezeh	Weight throw	1st	
Men's	2001 Outdoor	Janus Robberts	Shot put	1st	
Men's	2001 Outdoor	Andrey Borodkin	Shot put	6th	
Men's	2001 Outdoor	Janus Robberts	Discus throw	4th	
Women's	2001 Outdoor	Florence Ezeh	Hammer throw	1st	
Women's	2001 Outdoor	Nancy Guillen	Hammer throw	6th	
Women's	2001 Outdoor	Liza Randjelovic	Javelin throw	3rd	
Men's	2002 Indoor	Dalibor Balgac	3000 meters	7th	
Men's	2002 Indoor	Janus Robberts	Shot put	4th	
Men's	2002 Indoor	Andrey Borodkin	Shot put	8th	
Men's	2002 Outdoor	Roman Oravec	800 meters	7th	
Men's	2002 Outdoor	Dalibor Balgac	5000 meters	6th	
Men's	2002 Outdoor	Janus Robberts	Shot put	1st	
Men's	2002 Outdoor	Andrey Borodkin	Shot put	6th	
Men's	2002 Outdoor	Janus Robberts	Discus throw	1st	
Men's	2002 Outdoor	Hannes Hopley	Discus throw	3rd	
Men's	2002 Outdoor	Libor Charfreitag	Hammer throw	2nd	
Men's	2003 Indoor	Mindaugas Pukstas	5000 meters	8th	
Men's	2003 Indoor	Martin Allgeyer	Distance medley relay	4th	
Men's	2003 Indoor	Josef Rous	Distance medley relay	4th	
Men's	2003 Indoor	Abraham Ekal	Distance medley relay	4th	
Men's	2003 Indoor	Dalibor Balgac	Distance medley relay	4th	
Women's	2003 Indoor	Nevena Lendel	High jump	1st	
Men's	2003 Outdoor	Hannes Hopley	Discus throw	1st	
Men's	2003 Outdoor	Michael Robertson	Discus throw	3rd	
Men's	2004 Indoor	Hannes Hopley	Shot put	6th	
Women's	2004 Indoor	Nevena Lendel	High jump	6th	
Men's	2004 Outdoor	Mickael Hanany	High jump	4th	
Men's	2004 Outdoor	Hannes Hopley	Shot put	4th	
Men's	2004 Outdoor	Hannes Hopley	Discus throw	1st	
Men's	2004 Outdoor	Michael Robertson	Discus throw	3rd	
Men's	2004 Outdoor	Jerome Bortoluzzi	Hammer throw	5th	
Women's	2004 Outdoor	Nevena Lendel	High jump	7th	
Women's	2004 Outdoor	Lavada Hill	Long jump	7th	
Women's	2005 Indoor	Gaelle Niare	High jump	2nd	
Women's	2006 Indoor	Gaelle Niare	High jump	6th	
Women's	2006 Outdoor	Gaelle Niare	High jump	8th	
Women's	2007 Indoor	Gaelle Niare	High jump	5th	
Women's	2007 Outdoor	Gaelle Niare	Heptathlon	4th	
Women's	2008 Outdoor	Silje Fjortoft	3000 meters steeplechase	2nd	
Women's	2008 Outdoor	Andrea Kvetova	Javelin throw	4th	
Women's	2009 Outdoor	Christine Mueller	Discus throw	5th	
Women's	2010 Outdoor	Simone du Toit	Discus throw	6th	
Women's	2011 Indoor	Simone du Toit	Shot put	6th	
Women's	2011 Outdoor	Simone du Toit	Discus throw	4th	
Women's	2024 Outdoor	Funminiyi Olajide	Long jump	6th	

== See also ==
- Category:SMU Mustangs men's track and field athletes (39)
- Category:SMU Mustangs women's track and field athletes (10)
