= Omar Ahmed El Ghazaly =

Egyptian discus thrower (born 1984)

Personal information
- Born: February 9, 1984 (age 42)
- Height: 1.99 m (6 ft 6 1/2 in)
- Weight: 125 kg (276 lb)

Sport
- Country: Egypt
- Sport: Athletics
- Event: Discus
Medal record
Men's athletics
Representing Egypt
African Championships
Gold medal – first place	2006 Bambous	Discus throw
Gold medal – first place	2010 Nairobi	Discus throw
Bronze medal – third place	2002 Radès	Discus throw
- Updated on 12 August 2012

Omar Ahmed El Ghazaly (born 9 February 1984 in Cairo) is an Egyptian discus thrower.

== Career ==
He originally played handball, while his siblings were on the Egyptian national swimming team.

In 1999 he was recruited by former African shot put champion Nagui Asaad, who was setting up a throwing school that also included hammer thrower Mohsen El Anany and shot putter Yasser Fathy. After having a try with the different implements, he settled for the discus and rapidly made his debut in the national team. In 2000, aged 16, he was selected for the Egyptian team for the World Junior Championships, where he finished in 17th. That year he also won the Arab Championships with a throw of 53.07 m. At the 2002 World Junior Championships, a poor result of 10th was due to a shoulder injury. In 2003, his final year as a junior, he set a new junior world record of 65.88.

His personal best throw is 66.58 metres, achieved in June 2007 in Helsingborg. This is the current national record. In 2007, he also became the first Egyptian athlete to reach the final of an event at the Athletics World Championships.

His 2008 season did not go as well due to a series of injuries.

In June 2009, El Ghazaly gave a strong showing at a meeting in Sollentuna, Sweden, registering a number of throws over 65 metres and winning with 66.34 m. This was an African season's best throw and highlighted him as a possible finalist for the 2009 World Championships in Athletics. He again reached the final, but could only achieve 9th place.

His 2010 season was again marred by injury.

== Achievements ==
Year	Competition	Venue	Position	Event	Notes
Representing Egypt
2000	World Junior Championships	Santiago, Chile	17th (q)	Discus	50.43 m
2001	World Youth Championships	Debrecen, Hungary	3rd	Discus throw (1.5 kg)	61.06 m
2001	African Junior Championships	Réduit, Mauritius	2nd	Discus throw (1.75 kg)	49.79 m
2002	World Junior Championships	Kingston, Jamaica	10th	Discus throw (1.75 kg)	58.20 m
2002	African Championships	Radès, Tunisia	3rd	Discus throw	48.17 m
2003	African Junior Championships	Garoua, Cameroon	1st	Discus throw (1.75 kg)	61.87 m
2003	Universiade	Daegu, South Korea	9th	Discus throw	55.15 m
2003	All-Africa Games	Abuja, Nigeria	1st	Discus throw	63.61 m
2003	Afro-Asian Games	Hyderabad, India	3rd	Discus throw	59.77 m
2004	Olympic Games	Athens, Greece	33rd (q)	Discus throw	55.53 m
2004	Pan Arab Games	Algiers, Algeria	1st	Discus throw	61.06 m
2005	Islamic Solidarity Games	Mecca, Saudi Arabia	1st	Discus throw	59.89 m
2005	Universiade	İzmir, Turkey	2nd	Discus throw	62.28 m
2006	African Championships	Bambous, Mauritius	1st	Discus throw	61.11 m
2006	World Cup	Athens, Greece	4th	Discus throw	61.50 m
2007	All-Africa Games	Algiers, Algeria	1st	Discus throw	62.28 m
2007	Universiade	Bangkok, Thailand	2nd	Discus throw	60.89 m
2007	World Championships	Osaka, Japan	6th	Discus throw	64.58 m
2008	Olympic Games	Beijing, China	23rd (q)	Discus throw	60.24 m
2009	World Championships	Berlin, Germany	9th	Discus throw	62.83 m
2009	Jeux de la Francophonie	Beirut, Lebanon	1st	Discus throw	61.01 m
2010	African Championships	Nairobi, Kenya	1st	Discus throw	59.30 m
