= Athletics at the 2011 Summer Universiade – Men's shot put =

The men's shot put event at the 2011 Summer Universiade was held on 16 August.

== Medalists ==
Gold	Silver	Bronze
O'Dayne Richards; Jamaica	Soslan Tsyrikhov; Russia	Mason Finley; United States

== Results ==
=== Qualification ===
Qualification: 19.00 m (Q) or at least 12 best (q) qualified for the final.

Rank	Group	Athlete	Nationality	#1	#2	#3	Result	Notes
1	A	O'Dayne Richards	Jamaica	18.08	19.09		19.09	Q
2	B	Soslan Tsyrikhov	Russia	18.57	19.06		19.06	Q
3	A	Mason Finley	United States	18.92	x	x	18.92	q
4	B	Damian Kusiak	Poland	17.56	18.82	x	18.82	q
5	B	Kemal Mešić	Bosnia and Herzegovina	x	18.70	x	18.70	q
6	B	Emanuele Fuamatu	Samoa	18.24	18.69	x	18.69	q, PB
7	A	Daniel Vanek	Slovakia	18.15	18.65	x	18.65	q
8	B	Jaco Engelbrecht	South Africa	x	18.53	18.11	18.53	q
9	B	Ronald Julião	Brazil	17.54	18.14	18.46	18.46	q, SB
10	A	Hüseyin Atıcı	Turkey	16.86	17.28	18.21	18.21	q
11	A	Aleksandr Lobynya	Russia	18.02	17.72	17.25	18.02	q
12	B	Timothy Nedow	Canada	17.15	x	17.92	17.92	q
13	B	Martin Stašek	Czech Republic	x	17.24	17.52	17.52	
14	A	Marco di Maggio	Italy	17.13	x	17.40	17.40	
15	A	Andrew Smith	Canada	17.22	17.05	x	17.22	PB
16	B	Kaupo Valb	Estonia	16.79	17.10	16.79	17.10	
17	A	Jasdeep Singh Dhillon	India	16.08	16.24	16.18	16.24	
18	A	Frank Elemba	Republic of the Congo	14.10	15.71	15.61	15.71	
19	B	Diego Osorio	Chile	15.42	15.52	x	15.52	
20	B	Abdullah Alawi Alibrahim	Saudi Arabia	x	13.74	14.62	14.62	
21	B	Juan José Álvarez	Honduras	11.09	12.98	13.61	13.61	
	A	Siarhei Bakhar	Belarus	x	x	x	NM	

=== Final ===
Rank	Athlete	Nationality	#1	#2	#3	#4	#5	#6	Result	Notes
1st place, gold medalist(s)	O'Dayne Richards	Jamaica	17.45	18.69	19.93	18.62	x	x	19.93	PB
2nd place, silver medalist(s)	Soslan Tsyrikhov	Russia	19.00	19.34	19.80	19.43	19.75	x	19.80	
3rd place, bronze medalist(s)	Mason Finley	United States	18.63	19.23	19.72	x	x	x	19.72	
4	Aleksandr Lobynya	Russia	18.86	18.87	18.83	x	x	19.71	19.71	
5	Daniel Vanek	Slovakia	18.44	19.09	18.90	18.84	x	x	19.09	
6	Damian Kusiak	Poland	19.04	x	x	18.91	x	x	19.04	
7	Jaco Engelbrecht	South Africa	18.32	18.49	18.88	18.37	x	18.97	18.97	
8	Hüseyin Atıcı	Turkey	18.68	x	18.80	18.83	18.35	18.96	18.96	NR
9	Ronald Julião	Brazil	17.94	18.51	18.78				18.78	NR
10	Kemal Mešić	Bosnia and Herzegovina	x	18.33	18.66				18.66	
11	Emanuele Fuamatu	Samoa	18.08	18.28	18.32				18.32	
12	Timothy Nedow	Canada	17.99	18.13	x				18.13	
