= 2008 African Championships in Athletics – Men's discus throw =

The men's discus throw event at the 2008 African Championships in Athletics was held at the Addis Ababa Stadium on May 1.

== Results ==
Rank	Athlete	Nationality	#1	#2	#3	#4	#5	#6	Result	Notes
1st place, gold medalist(s)	Hannes Hopley	South Africa	55.67	56.83	x	x	x	56.98	56.98	
2nd place, silver medalist(s)	Yasser Ibrahim Farag	Egypt	51.57	56.06	55.32	x	54.38	x	56.06	
3rd place, bronze medalist(s)	Nabil Kiram	Morocco	50.82	52.58	52.99	x	x	51.78	52.99	
4	Chima Ugwu	Nigeria	47.95	x	50.84	48.61	x	x	50.84	
5	Yemi Ayeni	Nigeria	x	x	49.28	x	x	x	49.28	
6	Mitko Tilahun	Ethiopia	38.31	40.60	39.73	39.76	41.01	x	41.01	
7	Muhammed Sahile	Ethiopia	38.81	36.55	36.63	36.79	37.69	38.81	38.81	
8	Bekele Gebre	Ethiopia	34.10	33.70	29.67	34.79	x	31.54	34.79	
	Janus Robberts	South Africa							DNS	
