= 2008 African Championships in Athletics – Men's shot put =

The men's shot put event at the 2008 African Championships in Athletics was held at the Addis Ababa Stadium on May 1.

== Results ==
Rank	Athlete	Nationality	#1	#2	#3	#4	#5	#6	Result	Notes
1st place, gold medalist(s)	Mostafa Abdul El-Moaty	Egypt	15.52	17.41	17.73	18.06	x	17.99	18.06	
2nd place, silver medalist(s)	Yasser Ibrahim Farag	Egypt	x	16.54	17.39	x	x	x	17.39	
3rd place, bronze medalist(s)	Janus Robberts	South Africa	16.09	x	16.44	x	x	x	16.44	
4	Mohamed Meddeb	Tunisia	x	x	15.25	15.21	16.17	x	16.17	
5	Asahte Emml Ofori	Ghana	9.72	14.26	13.81	15.20	x	15.89	15.89	
6	Chima Ugwu	Nigeria	14.44	x	x	15.77	15.43	15.60	15.77	
7	Kenechukwu Ezeofor	Nigeria	14.78	x	14.63	x	x	15.04	15.04	
8	Ross Jordaan	South Africa	14.43	14.98	12.83	x	13.56	x	14.98	
9	Roelie Potgieter	South Africa	13.38	x	x				13.38	
10	Moussa Diarra	Mali	11.53	x	12.97				12.97	
11	Yemi Ayeni	Nigeria	12.65	x	x				12.65	
12	Sisay Mekonen	Ethiopia	x	10.52	12.12				12.12	
13	Muhammed Sahile	Ethiopia	10.29	10.87	11.76				11.76	
14	Bekele Gebre	Ethiopia	10.20	9.88	x				10.20	
	Mohamedi Hamis	Tanzania							DNS	
