= Robinzine =

Robinzine is a surname. Notable people with the surname include:

- Bill Robinzine (1953–1982), American basketball player
- Kevin Robinzine (born 1966), American sprinter
