= Jaco Engelbrecht =

South African shot putter (born 1987)

Personal information
- Born: 8 March 1987 (age 39)
- Education: University of Johannesburg
- Height: 1.98 m (6 ft 6 in)
- Weight: 146 kg (322 lb)

Sport
- Sport: Track and field
- Event: Shot put
Medal record
Men's athletics
Representing South Africa
All-Africa Games
| Silver medal – second place | 2011 Maputo | Shot put |
| Bronze medal – third place | 2015 Brazzaville | Shot put |
African Championships
| Gold medal – first place | 2016 Durban | Shot put |
| Silver medal – second place | 2014 Marrakesh | Shot put |

Jacobus Petrus Engelbrecht (born 8 March 1987) is a South African athlete specialising in the shot put. He has won several medals on continental level. In addition, he represented his country at the 2014 World Indoor Championships without qualifying for the final.

His personal bests in the event are 20.45 metres outdoors (Stellenbosch 2015) and 17.59 metres indoors (Sopot 2014).

== Competition record ==
| Year | Competition | Venue | Position | Event | Notes |
Representing South Africa
| 2011 | Universiade | Shenzhen, China | 7th | Shot put | 18.97 m |
| 2011 | All-Africa Games | Maputo, Mozambique | 2nd | Shot put | 18.89 m |
| 2012 | African Championships | Porto-Novo, Benin | 4th | Shot put | 17.91 m |
| 2013 | Universiade | Kazan, Russia | 5th | Shot put | 19.48 m |
| 2014 | World Indoor Championships | Sopot, Poland | 19th (q) | Shot put | 17.59 m |
| 2014 | African Championships | Marrakesh, Morocco | 2nd | Shot put | 18.87 m |
| 2015 | Universiade | Gwangju, South Korea | 6th | Shot put | 19.20 m |
| 2015 | World Championships | Beijing, China | 25th (q) | Shot put | 19.04 m |
| 2015 | African Games | Brazzaville, Republic of the Congo | 3rd | Shot put | 19.55 m |
| 2016 | African Championships | Durban, South Africa | 1st | Shot put | 20.00 m |
| 2017 | World Championships | London, United Kingdom | 27th (q) | Shot put | 19.59 m |
