= 2016 African Championships in Athletics – Men's shot put =

The men's shot put event at the 2016 African Championships in Athletics was held on 22 June in Kings Park Stadium.

== Results ==
Rank	Athlete	Nationality	Result	Notes
1st place, gold medalist(s)	Jaco Engelbrecht	South Africa	20.00	
2nd place, silver medalist(s)	Franck Elemba	Congo	19.89	
3rd place, bronze medalist(s)	Stephen Mozia	Nigeria	19.84	
4	Oghenakpobo Efekoro	Nigeria	19.57	
5	Orazio Cremona	South Africa	19.15	
6	Mohamed Magdi Hamza Khalif	Egypt	19.00	
7	Yao Adantor	Togo	17.98	
8	Burger Lambrechts Sr.	South Africa	17.79	
9	Bernard Baptiste	Mauritius	16.71	
10	Zegeye Moga	Ethiopia	14.58	
11	Georgio Vahoua	Ivory Coast	14.50	
12	Charlton Rickerts	Namibia	10.58	
	Luccioni Mve	Gabon	DNS	
	Enock Ngwenya	Zimbabwe	DNS	
