= Athletics at the 2010 Commonwealth Games – Men's shot put =

Men's shot put at the Commonwealth Games

The Men's shot put at the 2010 Commonwealth Games as part of the athletics programme was held at the Jawaharlal Nehru Stadium on Wednesday 6 October and Thursday 7 October 2010.

== Records ==
World Record	23.12	Randy Barnes	USA	Westwood, Los Angeles, USA	20 May 1990
Games Record	20.91	Justin Anlezark	AUS	Manchester, England	31 July 2002

== Results ==
=== Qualifying round ===
Qualification: Qualifying Performance 19.00 (Q) or at least 12 best performers (q) advance to the Final.

Rank	Athlete	1	2	3	Result	Notes
1	Dylan Armstrong (CAN)	20.01			20.01	Q
2	Dorian Scott (JAM)	18.85	19.59		19.59	Q
3	Dale Stevenson (AUS)	x	18.36	19.34	19.34	Q
4	Carl Myerscough (ENG)	18.54	18.82	18.79	18.79	q
5	Om Prakash Karhana (IND)	17.51	17.58	18.48	18.48	q
6	Scott Rider (ENG)	17.08	18.02	17.72	18.02	q
7	Sourabh Vij (IND)	17.16	x	16.41	17.16	q
8	Ryan Jones (WAL)	15.76	x	16.95	16.95	q
9	Emanuele Fuamatu (SAM)	16.55	16.75	x	16.75	q
10	Georgios Arestis (CYP)	16.33	x	16.74	16.74	q
11	Raymond Brown (JAM)	15.92	16.31	16.22	16.31	q
12	Zane Duquemin (JER)	15.63	16.01	15.13	16.01	q
13	Petros Mitsides (CYP)	15.28	15.44	15.50	15.50	
14	Fakapelu Sileti (TUV)	10.96	9.71	12.62	12.62	NR
	Raobu Tarawa (KIR)				DNS	

=== Final ===
Rank	Athlete	1	2	3	4	5	6	Result	Notes
1st place, gold medalist(s)	Dylan Armstrong (CAN)	19.99	x	20.76	x	20.47	21.02	21.02	GR
2nd place, silver medalist(s)	Dorian Scott (JAM)	20.19	x	x	19.83	19.70	20.03	20.19	
3rd place, bronze medalist(s)	Dale Stevenson (AUS)	19.21	19.99	19.80	x	19.44	19.76	19.99	PB
4	Carl Myerscough (ENG)	19.74	19.16	x	x	18.99	x	19.74	
5	Om Prakash Karhana (IND)	x	19.11	x	19.51	18.90	19.21	19.51	
6	Sourabh Vij (IND)	17.68	18.22	18.09	18.60	x	x	18.60	
7	Georgios Arestis (CYP)	17.50	17.86	17.53	18.01	18.20	x	18.20	
8	Scott Rider (ENG)	17.44	17.72	17.48	17.50	17.60	17.73	17.73	
9	Emanuele Fuamatu (SAM)	17.15	17.04	16.87				17.15	
10	Ryan Jones (WAL)	16.07	16.39	16.66				16.66	
11	Raymond Brown (JAM)	16.64	x	x				16.64	
12	Zane Duquemin (JER)	x	x	15.97				15.97	
