= Vernon Samuels =

British triple jumper

Personal information
- Nationality: British (English)
- Born: 5 October 1964 (age 61) Bristol, England
- Height: 188 cm (6 ft 2 in)
- Weight: 80 kg (176 lb)

Sport
- Sport: Athletics
- Event: Triple jump
- Club: Wolverhampton & Bilston AC

Vernon George Samuels (born 5 October 1964) is a British retired athlete who competed at the 1988 Summer Olympics.

== Biography ==
Samuels finished third behind Mike Conley and Eric McCalla in the triple jump event at the 1983 AAA Championships.

Samuels was a three-time All-American jumper for the SMU Mustangs track and field team, finishing 5th in the triple jump at the 1986 NCAA Division I Outdoor Track and Field Championships. At the British AAA Championships, he finished on the podium four more times from 1988 to 1990.

At the 1988 Olympic Games in Seoul, he represented Great Britain in the men's triple jump and represented England in the triple jump event, at the 1990 Commonwealth Games in Auckland, New Zealand.

He won the 1991 UK Athletics Championships triple jump event in Cardiff.
