= Franck Elemba =

Republic of the Congo athlete

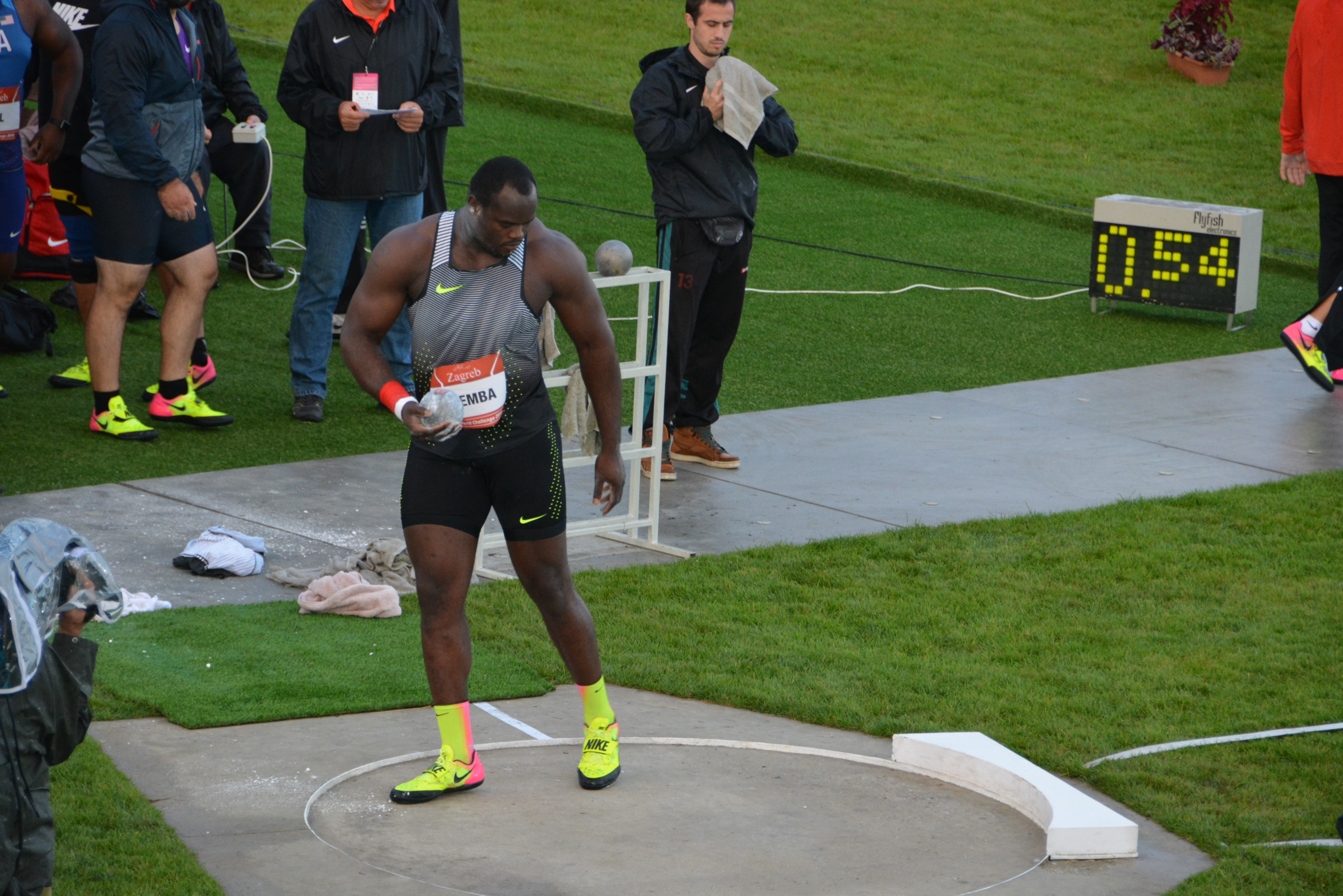
- Elemba at the 2016 Hanžeković Memorial

Personal information
- Born: 21 July 1990 (age 36)
- Height: 1.98 m (6 ft 6 in)
- Weight: 130 kg (290 lb)

Sport
- Country: Republic of the Congo
- Sport: Athletics
- Event: Shot put
Medal record
Men's athletics
Representing Republic of the Congo
African Games
Gold medal – first place	2015 Brazzaville	Shot put
Bronze medal – third place	2015 Brazzaville	Discus
African Championships
Silver medal – second place	2016 Durban	Shot put
Bronze medal – third place	2014 Marrakesh	Shot put

Franck Dannique Elemba Owaka (born 21 July 1990) is a Republic of the Congo athlete competing in the shot put. He represented his country at the 2014 World Indoor Championships and 2015 World Championships, as well as team Africa at the 2010 and 2014 Continental Cup.

He was born in Brazzaville, and represented his country at the 2016 Summer Olympics where he was placed 4th in the shot put with a throw of 21.20 metres. He was the flag bearer for the Republic of Congo during the Parade of Nations.

He has personal bests of 21.20 metres outdoors (Rio de Janeiro 2016) and 20.53 metres indoors (Karlsruhe 2016). Both results are current national records.

Earlier in his career he competed in judo, before turning to athletics in 2006.

== Competition record ==
Year	Competition	Venue	Position	Event	Notes
Representing the Republic of the Congo
2009	African Junior Championships	Bambous, Mauritius	4th	Shot put	14.93 m
2009	African Junior Championships	Bambous, Mauritius	5th	Discus throw	36.23 m
2009	Jeux de la Francophonie	Beirut, Lebanon	7th	Shot put	15.09 m
2009	Jeux de la Francophonie	Beirut, Lebanon	9th	Discus throw	40.95 m
2010	African Championships	Nairobi, Kenya	4th	Shot put	15.90 m
2010	African Championships	Nairobi, Kenya	12th	Discus throw	38.56 m
2010	Continental Cup	Split, Croatia	8th	Shot put	15.83 m (Note: Representing Africa)
2011	Universiade	Shenzhen, China	18th (q)	Shot put	15.71 m
2011	All-Africa Games	Maputo, Mozambique	5th	Shot put	16.44 m
2012	African Championships	Porto-Novo, Benin	5th	Shot put	16.23 m
2013	Jeux de la Francophonie	Nice, France	5th	Shot put	18.68 m
2014	World Indoor Championships	Sopot, Poland	18th (q)	Shot put	17.74 m
2014	African Championships	Marrakesh, Morocco	3rd	Shot put	18.74 m
2014	Continental Cup	Marrakesh, Morocco	7th	Shot put	19.72 m
2015	World Championships	Beijing, China	21st (q)	Shot put	19.40 m
2015	African Games	Brazzaville, Republic of the Congo	1st	Shot put	20.25 m
2015	African Games	Brazzaville, Republic of the Congo	3rd	Discus throw	50.30 m
2016	World Indoor Championships	Portland, United States	17th	Shot put	19.34 m
2016	African Championships	Durban, South Africa	2nd	Shot put	19.89 m
2016	Olympic Games	Rio de Janeiro, Brazil	4th	Shot put	21.20 m
2017	Jeux de la Francophonie	Abidjan, Ivory Coast	1st	Shot put	19.99 m
2017	World Championships	London, United Kingdom	24th (q)	Shot put	19.74 m
2019	African Games	Rabat, Morocco	6th	Shot put	19.17 m
2019	World Championships	Doha, Qatar	29th (q)	Shot put	19.76 m
Representing France
2026	Mediterranean Games	Taranto, Italy	6th	Shot put	19.44 m

== Notes ==
Olympic Games
Preceded by Lorène Bazolo	Flagbearer for Congo; Rio de Janeiro 2016	Succeeded by Natacha Ngoye Akamabi
