= 2010 African Championships in Athletics – Men's shot put =

The men's shot put at the 2010 African Championships in Athletics was held on July 28.

== Results ==
| Rank | Athlete | Nationality | #1 | #2 | #3 | #4 | #5 | #6 | Result | Notes |
|---|---|---|---|---|---|---|---|---|---|---|
| 1st place, gold medalist(s) | Burger Lambrechts | South Africa | X | 17.65 | 18.59 | 18.45 | 18.43 | 18.63 | 18.63 | |
| 2nd place, silver medalist(s) | Roelof Potgieter | South Africa | 17.74 | 17.73 | 16.77 | 18.62 | X | 18.31 | 18.62 | |
| 3rd place, bronze medalist(s) | Orazio Cremona | South Africa | 16.91 | – | 17.67 | 17.75 | 17.33 | 18.27 | 18.27 | |
| 4 | Franck Elemba Owaka | Republic of the Congo | 14.41 | 14.41 | 15.90 | 14.02 | 14.09 | 14.93 | 15.90 | NR |
| 5 | Moussa Diarra | Mali | X | 14.52 | 14.51 | 14.68 | X | X | 14.68 | |
| 6 | David Limo | Kenya | 14.46 | 14.55 | X | X | 13.97 | 13.90 | 14.55 | |
| 7 | Richard Metet | Kenya | 13.71 | 13.51 | 13.11 | 13.40 | 13.97 | 13.98 | 13.98 | |
| 8 | Vincent Tuikong | Kenya | 13.97 | X | X | 13.79 | X | X | 13.97 | |
| 9 | Romainio Houndeladji | Benin | X | 13.60 | 13.23 | | | | 13.60 | |
| 10 | Kwabena Keene | Ghana | X | X | 13.52 | | | | 13.52 | |
| | Mohamed Ibrahim | Tanzania | | | | | | | DNS | |
