= Gaëlle Niaré =

French high jumper

Personal information
- Nationality: France
- Born: 12 March 1982 (age 43) Colombes
- Height: 1.88 m (6 ft 2 in)

Sport
- Event: High Jump
- Club: CA Montreuil 93
- Coached by: Namakoro Niaré

Gaëlle Niaré (born 12 March 1982 at Colombes) is a French athlete, who specializes in the high jump. She is the daughter of Namakoro Niaré and sister of Yves Niaré.

== Biography ==
Niaré was a five-time All-American for the SMU Mustangs track and field team, finishing 2nd in the high jump at the 2005 NCAA Division I Indoor Track and Field Championships. She also finished 4th in the women's heptathlon at the 2007 NCAA Division I Outdoor Track and Field Championships.

In 1999, she placed third in the first World Youth Championships at Bydgoszcz Poland. She also placed fourth in the 2001 Junior European Championships.

She won six titles French National High Jump Championships: four in outdoor in 2000, 2002, 2003 and 2004 and two indoors in 2000 and 2003.

=== Prize list ===
- French Championships in Athletics :
  - winner of the high jump in 2000, 2002, 2003 and 2004
- French Indoors Championships in Athletics:
  - winner of the high jump 2000 and 2003

=== Records ===
Personal records
Event	Performance	Location	Date
High jump	1.93 m	Rennes Munich	7 June 2003 8 August 2004
