= Roar Hoff =

Norwegian shot putter (born 1965)

Roar Hoff (born 21 May 1965) is a retired Norwegian shot putter.

Hoff was a four-time All-American for the SMU Mustangs track and field team, finishing 5th in the shot put at the 1991 NCAA Division I Indoor Track and Field Championships and 1990 NCAA Division I Outdoor Track and Field Championships.

He finished twelfth at the 1994 European Championships and eleventh at the 1995 IAAF World Indoor Championships. He became Norwegian champion in 1992 and 1999.

His personal best throw was 19.52 metres, achieved in June 1994 in Drammen. This places him eighth among Norwegian shot putters through all time.
