= Athletics at the 2015 African Games – Men's shot put =

The men's shot put event at the 2015 African Games was held on 14 September.

== Results ==
Rank	Name	Nationality	#1	#2	#3	#4	#5	#6	Result	Notes
1st place, gold medalist(s)	Franck Elemba	Republic of the Congo	19.87	x	19.88	20.25	x	19.38	20.25	GR, NR
2nd place, silver medalist(s)	Mohamed Magdi Hamza	Egypt	17.96	18.14	18.55	19.52	x	19.78	19.78	
3rd place, bronze medalist(s)	Jaco Engelbrecht	South Africa	18.61	19.55	x	19.02	x	x	19.55	
4	Yawo Adantor	Togo	16.18	16.44	16.60	16.76	17.64	x	17.64	NR
5	Bernard Baptiste	Mauritius	16.55	16.10	x	15.62	15.58	16.08	16.55	NR
6	Timothée Lingani	Burkina Faso	15.39	16.11	x	16.12	x	x	16.12	NR
