= 2004 African Championships in Athletics – Men's discus throw =

The men's discus throw event at the 2004 African Championships in Athletics was held in Brazzaville, Republic of the Congo on July 14.

== Results ==
| Rank | Name | Nationality | Result | Notes |
|---|---|---|---|---|
| 1st place, gold medalist(s) | Frantz Kruger | South Africa | 63.85 | |
| 2nd place, silver medalist(s) | Hannes Hopley | South Africa | 63.50 | |
| 3rd place, bronze medalist(s) | Nabil Kirame | Morocco | 52.12 | |
| 4 | Yasser Ibrahim Farag | Egypt | 51.10 | |
