= Scott Rider =

British bobsledder and athlete

Personal information
- Nationality: British (English)
- Born: 22 September 1977 (age 48) Harlow, Essex, England
- Height: 188 cm (6 ft 2 in)
- Weight: 108 kg (238 lb)

Sport
- Sport: Bobsleigh, shot put, Highland games
- Club: Enfield Harriers

Scott Frederick Rider (born 22 September 1977) is a British former bobsledder, shot putter and Highland games competitor.

== Biography ==
Rider joined the British bobsleigh team in 2000, and he competed in the four man event at the 2002 Winter Olympics, where he and his team-mates finished 11th.

In shot putting, Rider represented England at three Commonwealth Games, in 2006, 2010 and 2014, finishing in the top ten in all three tournaments. He was also British outdoor champion in the shot put in 2014 and British indoor champion in 2003 and 2013. He is a member of Birchfield Harriers athletics club.

At the Highland games, Rider won the World Highland Games Championships in 2016. He was also World Caber Champion in 2013, 2014, 2016 and 2018.

Rider holds a BA in Sports Sciences and Art from Brunel University London.
