= Courtney Ireland =

New Zealand athlete (born 1972)

Personal information
- Born: 12 January 1972 (age 54)

Sport
- Sport: Track and field
Medal record
Representing New Zealand
Commonwealth Games
Silver medal – second place	1994 Victoria	Shot put

Courtney William Ireland (born 12 January 1972) is a New Zealand athlete specialising in the shot put.

He competed in the Commonwealth Games in 1990, and in 1994 when he won silver. In 1990, he was awarded the New Zealand 1990 Commemoration Medal.

He was in the US on a scholarship for the SMU Mustangs track and field team from 1991–1994, and he later played rugby in Japan for Coca-Cola.
