= 2014 African Championships in Athletics – Men's shot put =

The men's shot put event at the 2014 African Championships in Athletics was held on August 10 on Stade de Marrakech.

== Results ==
Rank	Athlete	Nationality	#1	#2	#3	#4	#5	#6	Result	Notes
1st place, gold medalist(s)	Orazio Cremona	South Africa	17.35	19.82	19.23	19.84	19.56	x	19.84	
2nd place, silver medalist(s)	Jaco Engelbrecht	South Africa	x	x	18.68	18.87	x	x	18.87	
3rd place, bronze medalist(s)	Franck Elemba	Republic of the Congo	18.58	18.41	18.74	18.47	18.43	18.37	18.74	
4	Stephen Mozia	Nigeria	17.65	x	17.58	x	x	x	17.65	
5	Mohamed Magdi Hamza	Egypt	16.31	17.46	x	16.90	17.45	17.64	17.64	
6	Mohammed Gharrous	Morocco	x	16.74	17.05	16.73	16.61	16.88	17.05	
7	Augustine Nwoye	Nigeria	x	16.09	16.26	x	16.90	x	16.90	
8	Yao Adantor	Togo	13.97	15.14	15.17	x	16.33	16.18	16.33	
9	Commission Mlaku	Ethiopia	x	x	13.74				13.74	
10	Dean William	Seychelles	12.85	12.77	12.78				12.85	
	Juma Ali Seifi	Tanzania							DNS	
	Mohamed Ibrahim Mtwana	Tanzania							DNS	
