= Orazio Cremona =

South African shot putter (born 1989)

Personal information
- Born: 1 July 1989 (age 36) Johannesburg, South Africa
- Education: Monash South Africa
- Height: 1.91 m (6 ft 3 in)
- Weight: 148 kg (326 lb) (2014)

Sport
- Sport: Athletics
- Event: Shot put
- Coached by: Dup de Preeze
Medal record
Men's athletics
Representing South Africa
African Championships
Gold medal – first place	2014 Marrakesh	Shot put
Silver medal – second place	2012 Porto-Novo	Shot put
Bronze medal – third place	2010 Nairobi	Shot put
African Junior Championships
Silver medal – second place	2007 Ouagadougou	Shot put

Orazio Cremona (born 1 July 1989) is a South African athlete specialising in the shot put. He finished seventh at the 2014 World Indoor Championships.

His personal bests in the event are 21.12 metres outdoors (Potchefstroom 2017) and 20.49 metres indoors (Sopot 2014).

== Competition record ==
Year	Competition	Venue	Position	Event	Notes
Representing South Africa
2007	African Junior Championships	Ouagadougou, Burkina Faso	2nd	Shot put (6 kg)	17.66 m
2008	World Junior Championships	Bydgoszcz, Poland	19th (q)	Shot put (6 kg)	18.28 m
2010	African Championships	Nairobi, Kenya	3rd	Shot put	18.27 m
2012	African Championships	Porto-Novo, Benin	2nd	Shot put	19.19 m
2013	World Championships	Moscow, Russia	15th (q)	Shot put	19.42 m
2014	World Indoor Championships	Sopot, Poland	7th	Shot put	20.49 m
2014	Commonwealth Games	Glasgow, United Kingdom	4th	Shot put	20.13 m
2014	African Championships	Marrakesh, Morocco	1st	Shot put	19.84 m
2015	World Championships	Beijing, China	27th (q)	Shot put	18.63 m
2016	African Championships	Durban, South Africa	5th	Shot put	19.15 m
2017	World Championships	London, United Kingdom	23rd (q)	Shot put	19.81 m
2018	Commonwealth Games	Gold Coast, Australia	6th	Shot put	20.51 m
2019	African Games	Rabat, Morocco	5th	Shot put	20.06 m
2019	World Championships	Doha, Qatar	24th (q)	Shot put	19.98 m
