= 2002 African Championships in Athletics – Men's discus throw =

The men's discus throw event at the 2002 African Championships in Athletics was held in Radès, Tunisia on August 8.

== Results ==
Rank	Name	Nationality	Result	Notes
1st place, gold medalist(s)	Janus Robberts	South Africa	54.32	
2nd place, silver medalist(s)	Walid Boudaoui	Algeria	49.49	
3rd place, bronze medalist(s)	Omar Ahmed El Ghazaly	Egypt	48.17	
4	Nabil Kirame	Morocco	47.76	
5	Eric Koo Wan Siong	Mauritius	36.14	
