= 2006 African Championships in Athletics – Men's discus throw =

The men's discus throw event at the 2006 African Championships in Athletics was held at the Stade Germain Comarmond on August 10.

== Results ==
Rank	Name	Nationality	#1	#2	#3	#4	#5	#6	Result	Notes
1st place, gold medalist(s)	Omar Ahmed El Ghazaly	Egypt	56.83	59.99	61.11	x	x	x	61.11	
2nd place, silver medalist(s)	Yasser Ibrahim Farag	Egypt	49.40	54.38	x	x	x	51.95	54.38	
3rd place, bronze medalist(s)	Chima Ugwu	Nigeria	49.86	51.56	51.52	51.55	x	x	51.56	
	Nabil Kiram	Morocco							DQ	
	E.O. Asante	Ghana							DNS	
	Pierre Ngarsou	Cameroon							DNS	
	Xavio Timchou Tallam	Cameroon							DNS	

Note: Nabil Kiram of Morocco originally finished in the bronze medal position with 53.41 metres but was later disqualified for doping.
