= Val Joe Walker =

American football player (1930–2013)

No. 47, 44
- Position: Defensive back

Personal information
- Born: January 7, 1930; Tahoka, Texas, U.S.
- Died: January 23, 2013 (aged 83); Dallas, Texas, U.S.
- Listed height: 6 ft 1 in (1.85 m)
- Listed weight: 179 lb (81 kg)

Career information
- High school: Seminole (Seminole, Texas)
- College: SMU
- NFL draft: 1952: 7th round, 83rd overall pick

Career history
- Green Bay Packers (1953–1956); Detroit Lions (1957)*; San Francisco 49ers (1957)
- * Offseason or practice squad member only

Awards and highlights
- Second-team All-American (1952)

Career NFL statistics
- Interceptions: 17
- Fumble recoveries: 7
- Total touchdowns: 1
- Stats at Pro Football Reference

Val Joe Walker (January 7, 1930 –January 23, 2013) was an American professional football player who was a defensive back in the National Football League (NFL). He played college football for the SMU Mustangs. He was selected by the New York Giants in the seventh round of the 1952 NFL draft, and would later play four seasons with the Green Bay Packers and one with the San Francisco 49ers.

Walker was also a two-time All-American hurdler for the SMU Mustangs track and field team, finishing 3rd in the 110 m hurdles at the 1952 NCAA track and field championships.
