= 2006 African Championships in Athletics – Men's shot put =

The men's shot put event at the 2006 African Championships in Athletics was held at the Stade Germain Comarmond on August 9.

== Results ==
Rank	Name	Nationality	#1	#2	#3	#4	#5	#6	Result	Notes
1st place, gold medalist(s)	Yasser Ibrahim Farag	Egypt	18.55	18.93	x	x	x	18.69	18.93	
2nd place, silver medalist(s)	Janus Robberts	South Africa	17.61	17.79	17.76	x	17.88	x	17.88	
3rd place, bronze medalist(s)	Mohamed Meddeb	Tunisia	x	17.61	x	17.40	17.87	17.46	17.87	
4	Chima Ugwu	Nigeria	15.83	16.58	16.59	x	–	–	16.59	
5	Selwyn Beauchamp	Seychelles	14.84	14.95	14.90	14.91	15.40	14.84	15.40	
