= 2010 African Championships in Athletics – Men's discus throw =

African Championship

The men's discus throw at the 2010 African Championships in Athletics was held on July 29.

== Results ==
Rank	Athlete	Nationality	#1	#2	#3	#4	#5	#6	Result	Notes
1st place, gold medalist(s)	Omar Ahmed El Ghazaly	Egypt	58.30	59.27	57.58	59.30	58.75	X	59.30	
2nd place, silver medalist(s)	Yasser Ibrahim Farag	Egypt	56.86	X	58.71	X	X	X	58.71	
3rd place, bronze medalist(s)	Victor Hogan	South Africa	55.01	54.90	54.03	56.58	55.18	58.11	58.11	
4	Nabil Kiram	Morocco	51.60	52.53	52.52	56.58	50.21	X	54.27	
5	Ali Khalifa	Libya	54.10	53.23	X	X	52.01	53.31	54.10	
6	Abdelmoumene Bourakba	Algeria	X	48.63	48.13	50.96	50.47	49.20	50.96	
7	Joshua Pondo	Kenya	X	45.90	46.13	47.52	45.93	48.17	48.17	SB
8	David Limo	Kenya	47.84	46.83	48.02	46.97	X	47.48	48.02	SB
9	Daniel Kimeli	Kenya	44.09	X	41.27				44.09	
10	Kwabena Keene	Ghana	43.14	43.03	42.92				43.14	
11	Siegfried Luccioni	Gabon	X	X	39.38				39.38	
12	Franck Elemba Owaka	Republic of the Congo	38.56	X	X				38.56	
