= Athletics at the 2003 All-Africa Games – Men's discus throw =

The men's discus throw event at the 2003 All-Africa Games was held on October 13.

== Results ==
| Rank | Name | Nationality | Result | Notes |
|---|---|---|---|---|
| 1st place, gold medalist(s) | Omar Ahmed El Ghazaly | Egypt | 63.61 | GR |
| 2nd place, silver medalist(s) | Hannes Hopley | South Africa | 62.86 | |
| 3rd place, bronze medalist(s) | Johannes van Wyk | South Africa | 62.43 | |
| 4 | Chima Ugwu | Nigeria | 62.26 | |
| 5 | Walid Boudaoui | Algeria | 55.88 | |
| 6 | Yasser Ibrahim Farag | Egypt | 55.73 | |
| 7 | Kenechukwu Ezeofor | Nigeria | 51.75 | |
| 8 | Ali Abdallah Khalifa | Libya | 50.68 | |
| 9 | Anthony Soalla-Bell | Sierra Leone | 39.84 | |
