= Athletics at the 2003 All-Africa Games – Men's shot put =

The men's shot put event at the 2003 All-Africa Games was held in Abuja, Nigeria.

== Results ==
Rank	Name	Nationality	Result	Notes
1st place, gold medalist(s)	Burger Lambrechts	South Africa	18.87	
2nd place, silver medalist(s)	Chima Ugwu	Nigeria	18.66	
3rd place, bronze medalist(s)	Yasser Ibrahim Farag	Egypt	17.96	
4	Roelie Potgieter	South Africa	17.91	
5	Hannes Hopley	South Africa	17.76	
6	Victor Omogberale	Nigeria	16.68	
7	Khalil Slimani	Algeria	16.47	
8	Kenechukwu Ezeofor	Nigeria	15.49	
9	Anthony Soalla-Bell	Sierra Leone	15.37	
10	Emmanuel Asante-Ofori	Ghana	15.26	
11	Kayembe Tshiaba	Democratic Republic of the Congo	13.05	
12	Takondwa Phiri	Malawi	10.95	
