= 2002 African Championships in Athletics – Men's shot put =

The men's shot put event at the 2002 African Championships in Athletics was held in Radès, Tunisia on August 6.

== Results ==
Rank	Name	Nationality	Result	Notes
1st place, gold medalist(s)	Janus Robberts	South Africa	19.73	
2nd place, silver medalist(s)	Hicham Aït Aha	Morocco	17.18	
3rd place, bronze medalist(s)	Mohamed Meddeb	Tunisia	16.40	
4	Wajdi Bellili	Tunisia	15.62	
5	Khalil Slimani	Algeria	15.31	
	Tshiaba Kayemba	Democratic Republic of the Congo	DNS	
