= Athletics at the 2006 Commonwealth Games – Men's shot put =

Men's shot put at the Commonwealth Games

The men's shot put event at the 2006 Commonwealth Games was held on 19–20 March 2006.

The winning margin was 1 cm which as of 2024 remains the only time the men's shot put was won by less than 3 cm at these games.

== Medalists ==
Gold	Silver	Bronze
Janus Robberts; South Africa	Dorian Scott; Jamaica	Scott Martin; Australia

== Results ==
=== Qualification ===
Qualification: 19.50 m (Q) or at least 12 best (q) qualified for the final.

Rank	Athlete	Nationality	#1	#2	#3	Result	Notes
1	Scott Martin	Australia	19.64			19.64	Q
2	Janus Robberts	South Africa	19.40	x	x	19.40	q
3	Carl Myerscough	England	18.95	18.94	x	18.95	q
4	Dorian Scott	Jamaica	17.69	18.19	18.90	18.90	q
5	Vikas Gowda	India	x	17.91	18.37	18.37	q, SB
6	Scott Rider	England	17.60	17.80	17.86	17.86	q
7	Clay Cross	Australia	17.57	17.75	17.84	17.84	q
8	Hannes Hopley	South Africa	x	16.24	17.68	17.68	q
9	Muhammad Ashraf Ali	Pakistan	17.40	x	17.25	17.40	q
10	Shaka Sola	Samoa	15.92	x	x	15.92	q
11	Mark Proctor	England	15.88	15.91	15.58	15.91	q
12	Petros Mitsides	Cyprus	15.42	x	14.72	15.42	q
13	Anthony Soalla-Bell	Sierra Leone	15.41	15.02	15.06	15.41	
14	Adonson Shallow	Saint Vincent and the Grenadines	14.00	14.76	x	14.76	
15	Dumsane Fakudze	Swaziland	14.15	x	x	14.15	

=== Final ===
Rank	Athlete	Nationality	#1	#2	#3	#4	#5	#6	Result	Notes
1st place, gold medalist(s)	Janus Robberts	South Africa	18.17	19.26	19.76	x	x	x	19.76	
2nd place, silver medalist(s)	Dorian Scott	Jamaica	19.33	x	x	x	18.42	19.75	19.75	
3rd place, bronze medalist(s)	Scott Martin	Australia	19.48	19.28	x	x	x	x	19.48	
4	Carl Myerscough	England	18.71	x	19.07	x	17.82	x	19.07	
5	Vikas Gowda	India	x	18.25	18.46	x	18.41	18.39	18.46	SB
6	Clay Cross	Australia	18.20	x	x	x	18.44	17.56	18.44	
7	Hannes Hopley	South Africa	18.44	x	x	x	17.97	18.04	18.44	
8	Mark Proctor	England	17.13	17.59	17.12	17.24	17.37	x	17.59	
9	Scott Rider	England	16.67	x	17.10				17.10	
10	Shaka Sola	Samoa	16.17	16.47	16.03				16.47	
11	Petros Mitsides	Cyprus	x	15.17	15.63				15.63	
	Muhammad Ashraf Ali	Pakistan							NM	
