= Dorian Scott =

Jamaican shot putter (born 1982)

Personal information
- Born: 1 February 1982 (age 44) East Orange, New Jersey, United States
- Education: Seton Hall Preparatory School
- Height: 1.86 m (6 ft 1 in)
- Weight: 132 kg (291 lb)

Sport
- Country: Jamaica
- Event: Shot put
Medal record
Commonwealth Games
Silver medal – second place	2010 Delhi	Shot put
Silver medal – second place	2006 Melbourne	Shot put
Pan American Games
Silver medal – second place	2007 Rio de Janeiro	Shot put
Central American and Caribbean Games
Gold medal – first place	2010 Mayagüez	Shot put
Gold medal – first place	2006 Cartagena	Shot put
CAC Championships
Gold medal – first place	2005 Nassau	Shot put
- Updated on 29 April 2023

Dorian Armand Scott (born 1 February 1982 in East Orange, New Jersey, United States) is a Jamaican shot putter.

He set a national record of 20.34 m to win at the 2006 Central American and Caribbean Games.

His personal best is 21.45 meters, achieved in March 2008 in Tallahassee, Florida. This was a Jamaican record before O'Dayne Richards broke it at the 2015 Pan American Games with a throw of 21.69.

Scott attended Seton Hall Preparatory School in West Orange, New Jersey and Florida State University in Tallahassee, Florida.

== Achievements ==
Year	Competition	Venue	Position	Event	Notes
Representing Jamaica
2003	Pan American Games	Santo Domingo, Dominican Republic	10th	Shot put	17.02 m
2004	NACAC U-23 Championships	Sherbrooke, Canada	3rd	Shot put	17.62 m
2005	Central American and Caribbean Championships	Nassau, Bahamas	1st	Shot put	20.21 m
2005	World Championships	Helsinki, Finland	25th (q)	Shot put	18.33 m
2006	Commonwealth Games	Melbourne, Australia	2nd	Shot put	19.75 m
2006	World Cup	Athens, Greece	5th	Shot put	20.21 m
2007	Pan American Games	Rio de Janeiro, Brazil	2nd	Shot put	20.06 m
2007	World Championships	Osaka, Japan	9th (q)	Shot put	20.01 m
2008	World Indoor Championships	Valencia, Spain	5th	Shot put	20.29 m
2008	Olympic Games	Beijing, China	15th (q)	Shot put	19.94 m
2010	Central American and Caribbean Games	Mayagüez, Puerto Rico	1st	Shot put	18.92 m
2010	Commonwealth Games	Delhi, India	2nd	Shot put	20.69 m
2012	Olympic Games	London, United Kingdom	10th	Shot put	20.61 m
