= Hüseyin Atıcı =

Turkish shot putter (born 1986)

Personal information
- Nationality: Turkey
- Born: 3 May 1986 (age 40) Tirebolu, Giresun Province, Turkey
- Height: 188 cm (6 ft 2 in)
- Weight: 118 kg (260 lb)

Sport
- Sport: Shot put
- Club: Fenerbahçe Athletics
- Coached by: Dimitar Georgiov Mindov

Achievements and titles
- Personal best: 20.30 m (2012)
Medal record
Men's athletics
Representing Turkey
Islamic Solidarity Games
Bronze medal – third place	2013 Palembang	Shot put

Hüseyin Atıcı (born 3 May 1986) is a Turkish track and field athlete competing in shot put. The 188 cm (6 ft 2 in) tall athlete at 118 kg (260 lb) is a member of Fenerbahçe Athletics, where he is coached by Dimitar Georgiov Mindov.

== Career ==
He qualified for participation in shot put event at the 2012 Summer Olympics, but did not reach the final round. At the 2013 Islamic Solidarity Games held in Palembang, Indonesia, Atıcı won the bronze medal.

== Competition record ==
Year	Competition	Venue	Position	Notes
Representing Turkey
2007	6th European U23 Championships	Debrecen, Hungary	15th (q)	17.27 m
2011	26th Summer Universiade	Shenzhen, China	8th	18.96 m
2012	14th World Indoor Championships	Istanbul, Turkey	23rd (q)	18.42 m
2012	21st European Championships	Helsinki, Finland	4th	20.24 m
2012	30th Summer Olympic Games	London, United Kingdom	20th (q)	19.74 m
2013	32nd European Indoor Championships	Gothenburg, Sweden	11th (q)	19.59 m
2013	17th Mediterranean Games	Mersin, Turkey	5th	19.53 m
2013	27th Summer Universiade	Kazan, Russia	6th	19.34 m
2013	3rd Islamic Solidarity Games	Palembang, Indonesia	3rd	18.56 m
