= Hannes Hopley =

South African discus thrower

Medal record

Men's athletics

Representing South Africa

African Championships
Gold medal – first place	2008 Addis Ababa	Discus throw
Silver medal – second place	2004 Brazzaville	Discus throw

Johannes ("Hannes") Hopley (born 26 January 1981) is a South African discus thrower, born in Pretoria. His personal best throw is 67.66 metres, achieved in May 2004 in College Station.

Competing for the SMU Mustangs track and field team, Hopley won an NCAA DI title in the discus. He did it in the team's last ever competition, as the team was eliminated following the 2004 season.

== Competition record ==
Year	Competition	Venue	Position	Event	Notes
Representing South Africa
2000	World Junior Championships	Santiago, Chile	1st	Discus throw	59.51 m
2003	All-Africa Games	Abuja, Nigeria	5th	Shot put	17.76 m
2003	All-Africa Games	Abuja, Nigeria	2nd	Discus throw	62.86 m
2004	African Championships	Brazzaville, Republic of the Congo	2nd	Discus throw	63.50 m
2004	Olympic Games	Athens, Greece	8th	Discus throw	62.58 m
2006	Commonwealth Games	Melbourne, Australia	7th	Shot put	18.44 m
2006	Commonwealth Games	Melbourne, Australia	4th	Discus throw	60.99 m
2007	All-Africa Games	Algiers, Algeria	3rd	Discus throw	57.79 m
2008	African Championships	Addis Ababa, Ethiopia	2nd	Discus throw	56.98 m
