= Athletics at the 2007 All-Africa Games – Men's discus throw =

The men's discus throw at the 2007 All-Africa Games was held on July 18.

== Results ==
Rank	Athlete	Nationality	Result	Notes
1st place, gold medalist(s)	Omar El Ghazaly	Egypt	62.28	
2nd place, silver medalist(s)	Yasser Fathy Ibrahim	Egypt	61.58	
3rd place, bronze medalist(s)	Hannes Hopley	South Africa	57.79	
4	Yemi Ayeni	Nigeria	57.64	
5	Ali Khelifa Abdallah	Libya	54.07	NR
6	Chima Ugwu	Nigeria	53.75	
7	Kenechukwu Ezeofor	Nigeria	53.51	
