= Yasser Farag Ibrahim =

Egyptian athlete (born 1984)

Medal record

Men's athletics

Representing Egypt

All-Africa Games
Gold medal – first place	2011 Maputo	Discus throw
Gold medal – first place	2011 Maputo	Shot put

African Championships
Gold medal – first place	2006 Bambous	Shot put
Silver medal – second place	2006 Bambous	Discus throw
Silver medal – second place	2008 Addis Ababa	Shot put
Silver medal – second place	2008 Addis Ababa	Discus throw
Silver medal – second place	2010 Nairobi	Discus throw
Silver medal – second place	2012 Porto-Novo	Discus throw
Bronze medal – third place	2004 Brazzaville	Shot put
Bronze medal – third place	2012 Porto-Novo	Shot put

Yasser Ibrahim Farag (Arabic: ياسر ابراهيم فرج; born May 2, 1984) is an Egyptian athlete competing in the shot put and discus throw events.

== Biography ==
He has also taken part in discus throw competitions. In 2003 he was the Egyptian champion in both shot put and discus throw.

His personal best shot put is 19.87 metres, achieved in July 2008 in Ústí nad Labem. In the discus throw he has 61.58 metres, achieved at the 2007 All-Africa Games.

== Competition record ==
Year	Competition	Venue	Position	Event	Notes
Representing Egypt
2001	African Junior Championships	Tunis, Tunisia	1st	Shot put	15.44 m
2001	World Youth Championships	Debrecen, Hungary	2nd	Shot put (5 kg)	19.58 m
2002	World Junior Championships	Kingston, Jamaica	7th	Shot put (6 kg)	19.49 m
2003	All-Africa Games	Abuja, Nigeria	3rd	Shot put	17.96 m
2003	All-Africa Games	Abuja, Nigeria	6th	Discus throw	55.73 m
2003	Afro-Asian Games	Hyderabad, India	7th	Shot put	16.65 m
2004	African Championships	Brazzaville, Republic of the Congo	3rd	Shot put	18.51 m
2004	African Championships	Brazzaville, Republic of the Congo	4th	Discus throw	51.10 m
2004	Pan Arab Games	Algiers, Algeria	2nd	Shot put	18.65 m
2005	Islamic Solidarity Games	Mecca, Saudi Arabia	4th	Shot put	17.65 m
2005	Islamic Solidarity Games	Mecca, Saudi Arabia	5th	Discus throw	56.14 m
2005	Mediterranean Games	Almería, Spain	9th	Shot put	17.36 m
2005	Mediterranean Games	Almería, Spain	7th	Discus throw	55.38 m
2006	African Championships	Bambous, Mauritius	1st	Shot put	18.93 m
2006	African Championships	Bambous, Mauritius	2nd	Discus throw	54.38 m
2006	IAAF World Cup	Athens, Greece	8th	Shot put	18.23 m
2007	All-Africa Games	Algiers, Algeria	1st	Shot put	19.20 m
2007	All-Africa Games	Algiers, Algeria	2nd	Discus throw	61.58 m
2007	Pan Arab Games	Cairo, Egypt	3rd	Shot put	19.42 m
2007	Pan Arab Games	Cairo, Egypt	3rd	Discus throw	57.74 m
2008	African Championships	Addis Ababa, Ethiopia	2nd	Shot put	17.39 m
2008	African Championships	Addis Ababa, Ethiopia	2nd	Discus throw	56.06 m
2008	Olympic Games	Beijing, China	37th (q)	Shot put	18.42 m
2009	Mediterranean Games	Pescara, Italy	3rd	Discus throw	61.07 m
2009	World Championships	Berlin, Germany	31st (q)	Shot put	18.69 m
2009	Jeux de la Francophonie	Beirut, Lebanon	2nd	Shot put	18.09 m
2009	Jeux de la Francophonie	Beirut, Lebanon	2nd	Discus throw	59.56 m
2010	World Indoor Championships	Doha, Qatar	19th (q)	Shot put	18.06 m
2010	African Championships	Nairobi, Kenya	2nd	Discus throw	58.71 m
2011	All-Africa Games	Maputo, Mozambique	1st	Shot put	19.73 m (GR)
2011	All-Africa Games	Maputo, Mozambique	1st	Discus throw	63.20 m
2011	Pan Arab Games	Doha, Qatar	1st	Shot put	19.44 m
2011	Pan Arab Games	Doha, Qatar	2nd	Discus throw	60.47 m
2012	African Championships	Porto-Novo, Benin	3rd	Shot put	18.78 m
2012	African Championships	Porto-Novo, Benin	2nd	Discus throw	59.61 m
2013	Mediterranean Games	Mersin, Turkey	6th	Shot put	19.25 m
2013	Mediterranean Games	Mersin, Turkey	6th	Discus throw	59.72 m
2013	Islamic Solidarity Games	Palembang, Indonesia	6th	Discus throw	56.01 m
2014	African Championships	Marrakesh, Morocco	5th	Discus throw	52.82 m
