= Aleksandr Lobynya =

Russian shot putter

Personal information
- Nationality: Russian
- Born: 31 May 1984 (age 42) Russia

Sport
- Sport: Track and field
- Event: Shot put

Achievements and titles
- Personal best: 21.00 m

Aleksandr Lobynya (born 31 May 1985) is a male Russian shot putter. His personal best throw is 21.00 metres, achieved in Adler on 25 May 2011.

== Career ==
- 2009

Lobynya broke the 20-metre barrier with a 20.09m effort in Bryansk on 27 June

- 2011

Lobynya produced a massive personal best of 21.00m, becoming the 2nd best Russian, 3rd best European, and the 11th best Outdoor Shot-Putter in the World in 2011, however he was omitted from the Russian National Team for the 2011 IAAF World Athletics Championships in Daegu, South Korea possibly due to the presence of rival Maksim Sidorov.
