= Rod Jones (cornerback) =

American football player (born 1964)

No. 22, 25
- Position: Cornerback

Personal information
- Born: March 31, 1964 (age 62); Dallas, Texas, U.S.
- Listed height: 6 ft 0 in (1.83 m)
- Listed weight: 185 lb (84 kg)

Career information
- High school: South Oak Cliff (Dallas)
- College: SMU
- NFL draft: 1986: 1st round, 25th overall pick

Career history
- Tampa Bay Buccaneers (1986–1989); Cincinnati Bengals (1990–1996)

Career NFL statistics
- Tackles: 531
- Interceptions: 10
- Fumble recoveries: 6
- Stats at Pro Football Reference

Roderick Wayne Jones (born March 31, 1964) is an American former professional football player who was a cornerback in the National Football League (NFL). He was selected by the Tampa Bay Buccaneers in the first round (25th overall) of the 1986 NFL draft. A 1982 graduate of South Oak Cliff High School and former player for Southern Methodist University, Jones played in 11 seasons for the Bucs and Cincinnati Bengals from 1986 to 1996. Running for the SMU Mustangs track and field program, he was an All-American in the 400 meters, and won national titles with the 1,600-meter relay team in 1984 and 1986. The latter occurred only four days before his report to Buccaneers training camp. He won SMU's Big Hit award in his last two football seasons, where he was nicknamed "K.O." for his hard-hitting play. He was later named as one of the players who had received slush-fund money in the scandal that resulted in SMU receiving the "death penalty" from the NCAA.

Jones was the first of the 1986 first-round draft picks to sign with his team. There was concern that his contract, described as "terrible" by sports agents, would set a bad precedent in negotiations that year. It featured a high signing bonus and a salary far below the previous year's average. He was inserted immediately into the Bucs' starting lineup as a rookie. In his professional career, he appeared in 146 games, intercepting 10 passes for 49 yards.

Jones' claim to fame is having caught Bo Jackson, who appeared to have a touchdown, from behind after an 88-yard run in 1990.
