= Burger Lambrechts =

South African shot putter

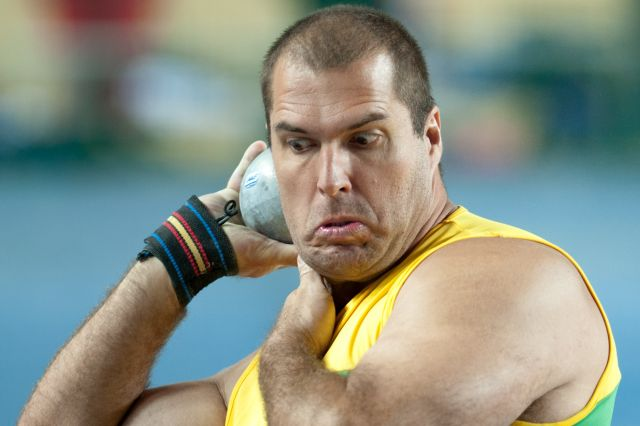
- Lambrechts at the 2012 World Indoor Championships

Personal information
- Born: Burger Lambrechts; 3 April 1973 (age 53) Phalaborwa, South Africa
- Education: University of Pretoria
Medal record
Men's athletics
Representing South Africa
African Championships
Gold medal – first place	1998 Dakar	Shot put
Gold medal – first place	2010 Nairobi	Shot put
Gold medal – first place	2012 Porto-Novo	Shot put
Silver medal – second place	2004 Brazzaville	Shot put

Burger Lambrechts (born 3 April 1973) is a South African shot putter.

== Life and career ==
He attended Laerskool Nelspruit, where he was head-boy in 1986 and Hoërskool Waterkloof, where he was vice head-boy in 1991. As far as tertiary education is concerned, Lambrechts attained a BSC (Genetics) from the University of Pretoria in 1995 and a BA ("Biology") from Western Michigan University in 1996.

His international career started with a fifteenth place at the 1992 World Junior Championships. The following year he took his first national shot put title. In 1994 he threw past the 19-metre mark for the first time, with 19.06 metres achieved in April in his birth city. At his first World Championships, in 1997, he reached the final and placed tenth. He only managed one valid throw. In 1998 he won the gold medal at the African Championships with a throw of 19.78 metres. This was the best winning result since 1982, when Youssef Nagui Asaad threw 20.44 metres. In the same year he threw 20.01 metres when winning the Commonwealth Games held in Kuala Lumpur, and 20.29 metres in Johannesburg in September. Rarely competing in other athletics events, Lambrechts did throw 53.68 metres with the hammer (1996) and 58.60 with the discus (October 1998).

The following year Lambrechts led a South African clean sweep in the shot put at the All-Africa Games while fellow South Africans (Frantz Kruger, Chris Harmse and Marius Corbett) won the other three throwing events for men. Throwing 19.50 metres, this time Lambrechts beat the championship record of Youssef Nagui Asaad, which had stood at 19.48 since 1973. He finished ninth at the World Championships the same year, once again with only one valid throw in the final round. At the 2000 Summer Olympic Lambrechts failed to reach the final for the first time in a worldwide event. He reportedly suffered a calf injury during the competition, but still managed to achieve a distance of 19.75 meter, with which he fell just 4 centimetres short of the place in the final, which ironically went to his compatriot Janus Robberts, though Canada's Bradley Snyder was even closer with 19.77 metres.

In February 2001 Lambrechts established a new South African record with 20.90 metres in Port Elizabeth, but the result was later disqualified as he was found to have been using the anabolic steroid Stanozolol. He'd tested positive for the substance at the meet in Port Elizabeth and also in a control seven days later, and was subsequently banned from sports for two years by the Athletics South Africa. Lambrechts returned from the doping ban to win the gold medal at the 2003 All-Africa Games, retaining the title he won four years earlier, and the silver medal at the African Championships in July 2004. The same month he achieved a lifetime best throw of 20.63 metres in Pretoria, which ranks him second in Africa behind fellow South African Janus Robberts. A month later he entered the 2004 Summer Olympics. Managing only 18.67 metres, he placed fourth from the bottom. He has not competed internationally since.

In 2007, at a bodyweight of 135 kg, Lambrechts became the heaviest person ever to successfully complete the 250 kilometer Kalahari Augrabies Extreme Marathon, an event billed as the toughest footrace in the world.

In 2008 the University of Pretoria inducted Lambrechts into their Hall of Fame.

In 2010 Lambrechts made a return to athletics after an absence of five years and, at the age of 37, won the African Championships for the second time. His season's best performance in the shot put was 19.26 meters and in the discus 52.10 meters. He then also represented the African continent at the IAAF Continental Cup (previously known as the IAAF World Cup), where he ended 6th. In doing so he set a new record for the longest span of appearances at the World Cup, namely 16 years (his first appearance was at the 1994 World Cup in London). The record was previously held by Tessa Sanderson, who achieved a span of 15 years between her first and last appearance.

In 2012 Lambrechts set a distance of 20.12m in the shot put in February, thereby qualifying for the World Indoor Championships and the Olympic Games (B standard). He competed at the World Indoor Championships in Istanbul, Turkey, but injured his middle finger the day before the competition in training (he fell on his hand and chipped the bone), causing him to only reach 18.96m and end 17th. He was the oldest person ever to compete in the men's Shot Put event at the World Indoor Championships. The South African Olympic Committee (SASCOC) did not select Lambrechts to go to the Olympic Games, where he would have been ranked 21st out of 41 competitors before the competition.

During the early stages of 2013 Lambrechts suffered from a foot injury, preventing him from entering any competitions, but in August he competed in the World Highland Games in Glasgow, Scotland. He won the title of World Stone Put Champion by putting a 10 kg stone 14.92m and a 7.26 kg stone 18.42m off a grass surface. he ended fifth in the overall Highland Championships.

== Competition record ==
Year	Competition	Venue	Position	Notes
Representing South Africa
1992	World Junior Championships	Seoul, South Korea	15th	15.66 m
1994	Commonwealth Games	Victoria, Canada	6th	18.15 m
1997	World Championships	Athens, Greece	10th	19.39 m
1998	African Championships	Dakar, Senegal	1st	19.78 m
1998	Commonwealth Games	Kuala Lumpur, Malaysia	1st	20.01 m
1999	World Championships	Seville, Spain	9th	19.29 m
1999	All-Africa Games	Johannesburg, South Africa	1st	19.50 m
2000	Olympic Games	Sydney, Australia	14th (q)	19.75 m
2003	All-Africa Games	Abuja, Nigeria	1st	18.87 m
2003	Afro-Asian Games	Hyderabad, India	2nd	18.97 m
2004	African Championships	Brazzaville, Republic of the Congo	2nd	18.78 m
2004	Olympic Games	Athens, Greece	34th (q)	18.67 m
2010	African Championships	Nairobi, Kenya	1st	18.63 m
2012	World Indoor Championships	Istanbul, Turkey	17th (q)	18.96 m
2012	African Championships	Porto-Novo, Benin	1st	19.51 m
2016	African Championships	Durban, South Africa	8th	17.79 m
