= Kevin Robinzine =

American sprinter (born 1966)

Personal information
- Full name: Kevin Bernard Robinzine
- Born: April 12, 1966 (age 60) Fort Worth, Texas, U.S.
Medal record
Men's athletics
Representing the United States
Olympic Games
Gold medal – first place	1988 Seoul	4 × 400 m relay
Pan American Games
Gold medal – first place	1987 Indianapolis	4 x 400 m relay
Summer Universiade
Gold medal – first place	1987 Zagreb	4 x 400 m relay

Kevin Bernard Robinzine (born April 12, 1966) is a former American sprinter who was a 1988 Olympic gold medalist in the men's 4 × 400 meter relay for the United States, where he ran the third leg. The team equalled the world and Olympic record from 1968 in Mexico with 2:56.16.

Running for the SMU Mustangs track and field program, Robinzine anchored the winning 1986 4 × 400 meter relay at the NCAA Division I Outdoor Track and Field Championships.
