= Roy Martin (sprinter) =

American sprinter (born 1966)

Personal information
- Nationality: American
- Born: December 25, 1966 (age 59) Dallas, Texas, United States

Sport
- Sport: Running
- Event: 200 meters
- College team: SMU Mustangs
- Coached by: Earnest James, Ted McLaughlin, Bob Kersee

Achievements and titles
- Personal best: 200 m: 20.05 (Indianapolis 1988)

Roy Chester Martin Jr. (born December 25, 1966) is a former American sprinter. He is considered one of the greatest high school sprinters in American history, and at the height of his career, he competed for the United States at the 1988 Summer Olympics.

As a high school senior in 1985, Martin set the National High School Record for 200 meters with a time of 20.13 seconds at the 1985 UIL Track and Field Championships in Austin. That same year, he also recorded the fastest prep time in the nation for 100 meters at 10.18 seconds and anchored his high school's 4×100 meter and 4×400 meter relay teams to marks (40.28 in the 4×100 and 3:09.4 in the 4×400) that are among the fastest ever recorded in high school competition. Martin was named Male Prep Athlete of the Year by Track & Field News in 1984 and in 1985 and was ranked #3 in the world at 200 meters as a high school senior. His national record for 200 meters stood until July 9, 2016, when it was surpassed by Noah Lyles.

There has never been one like him in high school. Carl Lewis, Michael Johnson, nobody.

— Earnest James, Martin’s coach at Dallas Roosevelt.

Martin was born and raised in Dallas, Texas. As a boy, he developed a mechanical running style that earned him the nickname "Robot" from his classmates at Franklin D. Roosevelt High School in Dallas. Throughout high school, Martin competed against Michael Johnson of Skyline High School, who later went on to set the world record at 200 and 400 meters and win four Olympic gold medals.

In head-to-head high school competition, Johnson never beat Martin. "He was phenomenal," Johnson recalled of Martin, during an interview in 2008 with the Dallas Morning News. "It was incredible to watch, but at the same time I had to compete against him every week," Johnson said. "You knew first place was gone. You tried to beat out the other guys for second."

He was named Track and Field News "High School Athlete of the Year" in 1984 and 1985, the first male athlete to win the award twice.

As a college freshman, Martin helped Southern Methodist University win the 1986 NCAA track and field championship with a 43.5-second relay carry that propelled the Mustangs to a dramatic victory. His coach at SMU proclaimed Martin "the greatest pure sprinter I’ve ever seen…better than Bob Hayes."

Martin dropped out of S.M.U. after his freshman year and enrolled at Paul Quinn College in Dallas. He later moved to Long Beach, California, to train with Bob Kersee and his wife Jackie Joyner-Kersee. Under Kersee's tutelage, Martin regained his form and competed for the United States in the 1988 Summer Olympics in Seoul, South Korea, where he finished sixth in the 200 meter dash semifinals. Martin retired from sprinting shortly after returning home to Dallas from the Olympics.

Martin has worked as a long-haul truck driver and has held positions as a track coach in the Dallas Independent School District and at Paul Quinn College. He founded and manages a non-profit track club for young Dallas-area athletes. In 2013, Martin was inducted into the Texas Track and Field Hall of Fame, and in 2019, he was inducted into the DISD Athletic Hall of Fame. He is a cousin of former Dallas Cowboys All Pro defensive end Harvey Martin.

Awards
Preceded by Clinton Davis	Track & Field News High School Boys Athlete of the Year; 1984, 1985	Succeeded by Derrick Florence
Records
Preceded by (United States) Dwayne Evans	Men's World Junior Record Holder, 200 metres 11 May 1985 – 11 April 2004	Succeeded by (Jamaica) Usain Bolt
