= Mohamed Meddeb =

Tunisian shot putter (born 1981)

Medal record

Men's athletics

Representing Tunisia

African Championships
Bronze medal – third place	2002 Radès	Shot put

Mohamed Meddeb (born 9 August 1981) is a Tunisian former athlete specializing in the shot put.

His personal best of 18.51 metres (2006) is the current national record. He finished 3rd in the shot put at the African Championships in Athletics in both 2002 and 2006.
