= Janus Robberts =

South African athlete (born 1979)

Medal record

Men's athletics

Representing South Africa

African Championships
Gold medal – first place	2002 Radès	Shot put
Gold medal – first place	2002 Radès	Discus throw
Gold medal – first place	2004 Brazzaville	Shot put
Silver medal – second place	2006 Bambous	Shot put
Bronze medal – third place	2008 Addis Ababa	Shot put

Commonwealth Games
Silver medal – second place	2002 Manchester	Shot Put

Janus Robberts (born 10 March 1979 in Louis Trichardt) is a South African athlete who competes in shot put, and occasionally in the discus throw. He is the current African record holder in shot put with 21.97 metres and is also a former junior world record holder. He also holds the African indoor record with 21.47 metres, achieved in December 2001 in Norman.

Competing for the SMU Mustangs track and field program, he won NCAA titles in the shot put and discus.

== Achievements ==
Year	Competition	Venue	Position	Event	Notes
Representing South Africa
1997	African Junior Championships	Ibadan, Nigeria	1st	Shot put	18.55 m
1997	African Junior Championships	Ibadan, Nigeria	1st	Discus throw	54.55 m
1998	World Junior Championships	Annecy, France	2nd	Shot put	18.15 m
1998	World Junior Championships	Annecy, France	7th	Discus throw	55.63 m
1998	Commonwealth Games	Kuala Lumpur, Malaysia	5th	Shot put	19.15 m
1999	World Championships	Seville, Spain	20th (q)	Shot put	19.37 m
1999	All-Africa Games	Johannesburg, South Africa	2nd	Shot put	19.16 m
1999	All-Africa Games	Johannesburg, South Africa	4th	Discus throw	56.82 m
2000	Olympic Games	Sydney, Australia	7th	Shot put	20.32 m
2001	World Championships	Edmonton, Canada	12th	Shot put	20.18 m
2002	Commonwealth Games	Manchester, United Kingdom	2nd	Shot put	19.97 m
2002	Commonwealth Games	Manchester, United Kingdom	7th	Discus throw	57.02 m
2002	African Championships	Radès, Tunisia	1st	Shot put	19.73 m
2002	African Championships	Radès, Tunisia	1st	Discus throw	54.32 m
2003	World Championships	Paris, France	25th (q)	Shot put	19.02 m m
2004	World Indoor Championships	Budapest, Hungary	17th (q)	Shot put	19.41 m
2004	African Championships	Brazzaville, Republic of the Congo	1st	Shot put	21.02 m
2004	Olympic Games	Athens, Greece	20th (q)	Shot put	19.41 m
2005	World Championships	Helsinki, Finland	–	Shot put	NM
2006	World Indoor Championships	Moscow, Russia	12th (q)	Shot put	19.39 m
2006	Commonwealth Games	Melbourne, Australia	1st	Shot put	19.76 m
2006	Commonwealth Games	Melbourne, Australia	9th	Discus throw	55.57 m
2006	African Championships	Bambous, Mauritius	2nd	Shot put	17.88 m
2008	African Championships	Addis Ababa, Ethiopia	3rd	Shot put	16.44 m
