= 2026 European Athletics Championships – Men's hammer throw =

Men's hammer throw at the 2026 European Athletics Championships
- Venue: Alexander Stadium
- Location: Birmingham, United Kingdom
- Dates: 10 August 2026 (qualification) 11 August 2026 (final)
- Competitors: 30 from 19 nations
- Winning distance: 84.25 m WL, NR

Medalists
| gold medal | Bence Halász | Hungary |
| silver medal | Merlin Hummel | Germany |
| bronze medal | Mykhaylo Kokhan | Ukraine |

The men's hammer throw at the 2026 European Athletics Championships took place over two rounds at the Alexander Stadium in Birmingham, United Kingdom, on 10 and 11 August 2026.

== Background ==
Records before the 2026 European Athletics Championships
| Record | Athlete (nation) | Distance | Location | Date |
|---|---|---|---|---|
| World record | Yuriy Sedykh (URS) | 86.74 m | Stuttgart, West Germany | 30 August 1986 |
| European record | Yuriy Sedykh (URS) | 86.74 m | Stuttgart, West Germany | 30 August 1986 |
| Championship record | Yuriy Sedykh (URS) | 86.74 m | Stuttgart, West Germany | 30 August 1986 |
| World leading | Ethan Katzberg (CAN) | 83.64 m | Budapest, Hungary | 14 July 2026 |
| European leading | Yann Chaussinand (FRA) | 82.44 m | Wilmington, United States | 13 June 2026 |

== Qualification ==
For the men's hammer throw, the qualification period was from 27 July 2025 to 26 July 2026. Athletes qualified by achieving the entry standard of 77.00 m or better, by wildcard for the 2024 European Athletics Champion, or by their position on the World Athletics Rankings for the event. The target number was 30 athletes.

Qualification standings per 31 July 2026
| QP | CP | Country | Athlete | PB | SB | Status | Details |
|---|---|---|---|---|---|---|---|
| 1 | 1 | Poland | Wojciech Nowicki | 82.52 | 75.27 | Qualified by Wild Card | Defending European Champion |
| 2 | 1 | Hungary | Bence Halász | 83.18 | 81.87 | Qualified by Entry Standard | 83.18 - Nemzeti Atlétikai Központ, Budapest (HUN) - 12 AUG 2025 |
| 3 | 1 | Germany | Merlin Hummel | 82.77 | 81.74 | Qualified by Entry Standard | 82.77 - National Stadium, Tokyo (JPN) - 16 SEP 2025 |
| 4 | 1 | France | Yann Chaussinand | 82.44 | 82.44 | Qualified by Entry Standard | 82.44 - Colich Throws Center, Wilmington, CA (USA) - 13 JUN 2026 |
| 5 | 1 | Ukraine | Mykhaylo Kokhan | 82.38 | 82.38 | Qualified by Entry Standard | 82.38 - Colich Throws Center, Wilmington, CA (USA) - 13 JUN 2026 |
| 6 | 2 | Poland | Paweł Fajdek | 83.93 | 82.09 | Qualified by Entry Standard | 82.09 - Stade Raymond Petit, Tomblaine (FRA) - 03 JUL 2026 |
| 7 | 2 | Hungary | Ármin Szabados | 80.95 | 80.95 | Qualified by Entry Standard | 80.95 - Egyetemi Stadion, Veszprém (HUN) - 25 APR 2026 |
| 8 | 1 | Czech Republic | Volodymyr Myslyvčuk | 80.69 | 80.69 | Qualified by Entry Standard | 80.69 - GPS Stadium, Nicosia (CYP) - 15 MAR 2026 |
| 9 | 1 | Greece | Christos Frantzeskakis | 79.09 | 79.09 | Qualified by Entry Standard | 79.09 - Elena Venizelou National Stadium, Chania (GRE) - 09 MAY 2026 |
| 10 | 1 | Norway | Thomas Mardal | 78.66 | 78.66 | Qualified by Entry Standard | 78.66 - Fana Stadion, Bergen (NOR) - 28 MAY 2026 |
| 11 | 1 | Cyprus | Iosif Kesidis | 78.61 | 78.61 | Qualified by Entry Standard | 78.61 - Sports Park Mladost, Zagreb (CRO) - 26 JUN 2026 |
| 12 | 2 | Germany | Sören Klose | 78.18 | 78.18 | Qualified by Entry Standard | 78.18 - Lohrheidestadion, Wattenscheid, Bochum (GER) - 26 JUL 2026 |
| 13 | 1 | Iceland | Hilmar Örn Jónsson | 78.03 | 78.03 | Qualified by Entry Standard | 78.03 - GPS Stadium, Nicosia (CYP) - 15 MAR 2026 |
| 14 | 1 | Great Britain & N.I. | Jake Norris | 77.76 | 77.76 | Qualified by Entry Standard | 77.76 - Werferzentrum Brandberge, Halle (GER) - 16 MAY 2026 |
| 15 | 2 | Greece | Georgios Papanastasiou | 77.71 | 77.71 | Qualified by Entry Standard | 77.71 - National Stadium, Serres (GRE) - 11 JUL 2026 |
| 16 | 2 | Norway | Eivind Henriksen | 81.58 | 75.37 | Qualified by Entry Standard | 77.70 - National Stadium, Tokyo (JPN) - 15 SEP 2025 |
| 17 | 3 | Hungary | Dániel Rába | 76.83 | 74.06 | Qualified by World Rankings | 14th - 1202 points |
| 18 | 1 | Netherlands | Denzel Comenentia | 79.09 | 75.87 | Qualified by World Rankings | 15th - 1188 points |
| 19 | 1 | Croatia | Matija Gregurić | 76.68 | 76.50 | Qualified by World Rankings | 18th - 1181 points |
| 20 | 3 | Poland | Marcin Wrotyński | 77.01 | 76.72 | Qualified by World Rankings | 19th - 1173 points |
| 21 | 1 | Albania | Markelo Mema | 76.57 | 76.57 | Qualified by World Rankings | 21st - 1167 points |
| 22 | 3 | Greece | Mihail Anastasakis | 77.72 | 76.36 | Qualified by World Rankings | 22nd - 1166 points |
| 23 | 1 | Finland | Henri Liipola | 75.88 | 75.88 | Qualified by World Rankings | 24th - 1163 points |
| reserve | 4 | Greece | Angelos Mantzouranis | 78.61 | 75.98 | Qualified by World Rankings | 25th - 1158 points |
| 24 | 2 | Czech Republic | Patrik Hájek | 78.20 | 75.66 | Qualified by World Rankings | 27th - 1155 points |
| 25 | 1 | Turkey | Halil Yilmazer | 75.01 | 74.66 | Qualified by World Rankings | 28th - 1150 points |
| 26 | 4 | Poland | Dawid Piłat | 75.40 | 75.40 | Qualified by World Rankings | 31st - 1144 points |
| 27 | 1 | Estonia | Adam Kelly | 75.81 | 74.85 | Qualified by World Rankings | 32nd - 1144 points |
| 28 | 1 | Italy | Giorgio Olivieri | 74.39 | 74.27 | Qualified by World Rankings | 33rd - 1143 points |
| reserve | 4 | Hungary | Gábor Czeller | 74.48 | 74.48 | Qualified by World Rankings | 34th - 1142 points |
| 29 | 2 | Turkey | Özkan Baltacı | 77.50 | 73.87 | Qualified by World Rankings | 36th - 1138 points |
| 30 | 1 | Sweden | Ragnar Carlsson | 77.57 | 73.90 | Qualified by World Rankings | 37th - 1135 points |
| reserve | 1 | Slovakia | Marcel Lomnický | 79.19 | 72.33 | Next best by World Rankings | 39th - 1129 points |
| reserve | 1 | Slovenia | Jan Emberšič | 72.71 | 72.71 | Next best by World Rankings | 40th - 1117 points |
| reserve | 2 | Finland | Aaron Kangas | 79.05 | 74.28 | Next best by World Rankings | 44th - 1102 points |
| reserve | 3 | Finland | Max Lampinen | 72.48 | 71.64 | Next best by World Rankings | 46th - 1101 points |
| reserve | 4 | Finland | Tuomas Seppänen | 76.20 | 71.53 | Next best by World Rankings | 48th - 1099 points |
| reserve | 2 | Italy | Davide Costa | 74.17 | 74.17 | Next best by World Rankings | 50th - 1096 points |
| reserve | 5 | Finland | Roope Auvinen | 72.77 | 72.77 | Next best by World Rankings | 51st - 1095 points |
| reserve | 3 | Italy | Filippo Maria Iacocca | 71.33 | 71.33 | Next best by World Rankings | 60th - 1076 points |
| reserve | 1 | Bulgaria | Valentin Andreev | 74.02 | 69.94 | Next best by World Rankings | 66th - 1068 points |

| Bye to semi-finals | Reserve activated | Withdrawal / reserve unused |

== Schedule ==
| Date | Time | Round |
|---|---|---|
| 10 August 2026 | 10:40 | Qualification. |
| 11 August 2026 | 19:10 | Final |

All times are local times (UTC+1)

== Results ==
=== Qualification ===
The qualification round was held on 10 August 2026, at 10:44 in the morning. All athletes meeting the Qualification Standard (Q) of 78.00 m or at least 12 best performers (q) advanced to the final.

==== Group A ====
| Place | Athlete | Nation | Round | | | Result | Notes |
| Place | Athlete | Nation | #1 | #2 | #3 | Result | Notes |
|---|---|---|---|---|---|---|---|
| 1 | Bence Halász | Hungary | 79.58 | – | – | 79.58 m | Q |
| 2 | Yann Chaussinand | France | 74.61 | x | 77.45 | 77.45 m | q |
| 3 | Hilmar Örn Jónsson | Iceland | 73.13 | 73.44 | 76.63 | 76.63 m | q |
| 4 | Jake Norris | Great Britain & N.I. | 73.72 | x | 75.67 | 75.67 m | q |
| 5 | Merlin Hummel | Germany | x | 74.77 | 75.49 | 75.49 m | q |
| 6 | Christos Frantzeskakis | Greece | 71.01 | 75.22 | 73.85 | 75.22 m | q |
| 7 | Wojciech Nowicki | Poland | 74.14 | 73.74 | 74.49 | 74.49 m | |
| 8 | Markelo Mema | Albania | x | 72.96 | 74.09 | 74.09 m | |
| 9 | Matija Gregurić | Croatia | 73.20 | 73.49 | 72.69 | 73.49 m | |
| 10 | Thomas Mardal | Norway | x | 73.23 | x | 73.23 m | |
| 11 | Denzel Comenentia | Netherlands | x | 72.00 | x | 72.00 m | |
| 12 | Giorgio Olivieri | Italy | 71.83 | 71.05 | x | 71.83 m | |
| 13 | Dawid Piłat | Poland | 70.63 | x | x | 70.63 m | |
| 14 | Patrik Hájek | Czech Republic | 70.24 | 70.56 | x | 70.56 m | |
| 15 | Özkan Baltacı | Turkey | 68.59 | 68.90 | x | 68.90 m | |

==== Group B ====
| Place | Athlete | Nation | Round | | | Result | Notes |
| Place | Athlete | Nation | #1 | #2 | #3 | Result | Notes |
|---|---|---|---|---|---|---|---|
| 1 | Volodymyr Myslyvčuk | Czech Republic | 79.61 | – | – | 79.61 m | Q |
| 2 | Mykhaylo Kokhan | Ukraine | 74.22 | 77.40 | – | 77.40 m | q |
| 3 | Paweł Fajdek | Poland | 74.57 | x | 77.35 | 77.35 m | q |
| 4 | Ármin Szabados | Hungary | 77.08 | 75.38 | – | 77.08 m | q |
| 5 | Sören Klose | Germany | 75.80 | 73.48 | 71.17 | 75.80 m | q |
| 6 | Iosif Kesidis | Cyprus | 74.02 | 75.48 | 73.13 | 75.48 m | q, NU23R |
| 7 | Marcin Wrotyński | Poland | x | 72.90 | 72.37 | 72.90 m | |
| 8 | Michail Anastasakis | Greece | 72.05 | 71.84 | 72.57 | 72.57 m | |
| 9 | Eivind Henriksen | Norway | 72.06 | 69.10 | x | 72.06 m | |
| 10 | Adam Kelly | Estonia | 68.63 | x | 71.63 | 71.63 m | |
| 11 | Henri Liipola | Finland | 66.56 | 71.23 | 69.35 | 71.23 m | |
| 12 | Gábor Czeller | Hungary | 70.47 | 70.38 | 67.71 | 70.47 m | |
| 13 | Halil Yılmazer | Turkey | 69.53 | x | x | 69.53 m | |
| 14 | Ragnar Carlsson | Sweden | x | x | 68.54 | 68.54 m | |
| 15 | Georgios Papanastasiou | Greece | 66.10 | 67.89 | x | 67.89 m | |

=== Final ===
The final was held on 11 August 2026, at 19:10 in the evening.

| Place | Athlete | Nation | Round | | | | | | Result | Notes |
| Place | Athlete | Nation | #1 | #2 | #3 | #4 | #5 | #6 | Result | Notes |
|---|---|---|---|---|---|---|---|---|---|---|
| 1st place, gold medalist(s) | Bence Halász | Hungary | 80.96 | 77.99 | 81.84 | 80.69 | 84.25 | x | 84.25 m | WL, NR |
| 2nd place, silver medalist(s) | Merlin Hummel | Germany | 79.08 | x | x | 75.97 | 81.30 | x | 81.30 m | |
| 3rd place, bronze medalist(s) | Mykhaylo Kokhan | Ukraine | 78.70 | x | 78.76 | 79.10 | 79.49 | x | 79.49 m | |
| 4 | Volodymyr Myslyvčuk | Czech Republic | 78.45 | 79.42 | 76.89 | 78.93 | 79.42 | x | 79.42 m | |
| 5 | Paweł Fajdek | Poland | 79.13 | x | 76.71 | x | x | x | 79.13 m | |
| 6 | Sören Klose | Germany | 77.10 | 75.94 | 78.13 | x | 77.16 | x | 78.13 m | |
| 7 | Hilmar Örn Jónsson | Iceland | 74.38 | 77.26 | x | 76.89 | x | x | 77.26 m | |
| 8 | Ármin Szabados | Hungary | x | x | 76.91 | x | x | x | 76.91 m | |
| 9 | Yann Chaussinand | France | x | x | 76.19 | | | | 76.19 m | |
| 10 | Christos Frantzeskakis | Greece | 75.06 | 75.72 | x | | | | 75.72 m | |
| 11 | Jake Norris | Great Britain & N.I. | 74.61 | x | 74.35 | | | | 74.61 m | |
| 12 | Iosif Kesidis | Cyprus | x | x | 72.27 | | | | 72.27 m | |
