= 2013 World Youth Championships in Athletics – Boys' hammer throw =

Boys' hammer throw at the 2013 World Youth Championships in Athletics
- Venue: RSC Olimpiyskiy
- Dates: 11 July (qualification); 12 July (final)
- Competitors: 39
- Winning distance: 79.38 PB

Medalists
gold medal	Matija Gregurić	Croatia
silver medal	Pavel Paliakou	Belarus
bronze medal	Matthew Denny	Australia

The boys' hammer throw at the 2013 World Youth Championships in Athletics was held on 11 and 12 July.

== Medalists ==
Gold	Silver	Bronze
Matija Gregurić; Croatia	Pavel Paliakou; Belarus	Matthew Denny; Australia

== Records ==
Prior to the competition, the following records were as follows.

World Youth Best	Ashraf Amgad El-Seify (QAT)	85.26	Rhede, Germany	20 July 2011
Championship Record	Bence Pásztor (HUN)	82.60	Lille, France	8 July 2011
World Youth Leading	Joaquín Gómez (ARG)	81.88	Buenos Aires, Argentina	9 March 2013

== Qualification ==
Qualification rule: 71.50 (Q) or at least 12 best performers (q) qualified.

Rank	Group	Name	Nationality	#1	#2	#3	Result	Notes
1	A	Tshepang Makhethe	South Africa	74.97			74.97	Q, PB
2	B	Bence Halász	Hungary	74.86			74.86	Q
3	A	Matthew Denny	Australia	x	x	74.41	74.41	Q
4	B	Matija Gregurić	Croatia	70.01	74.23		74.23	Q
5	B	Pavel Paliakou	Belarus	74.18			74.18	Q
6	A	Alexei Mikhailov	Germany	73.94			73.94	Q, PB
7	B	Matthew Bloxham	New Zealand	73.83			73.83	Q
8	B	Miguel Blanco	Spain	70.59	x	72.68	72.68	Q, SB
9	B	Ahmed Amgad El-Seify	Qatar	x	72.23		72.23	Q
10	B	Volodymyr Myslyvčuk	Ukraine	x	x	72.20	72.20	Q
11	A	Raman Zholudzeu	Belarus	71.95			71.95	Q
12	B	Gabriel Kehr	Chile	71.68			71.68	Q, PB
13	B	Colin Minor	United States	x	70.11	71.52	71.52	Q, PB
14	A	Taylor Campbell	Great Britain	61.57	x	71.49	71.49	
15	A	Juan Romano	Argentina	x	70.51	71.42	71.42	
16	A	Daniel Ivanoff	Finland	x	68.49	71.10	71.10	PB
17	A	Hilmar Örn Jónsson	Iceland	69.60	x	70.98	70.98	
18	B	Costa Kousparis	Australia	59.37	x	70.93	70.93	
19	A	Ahmed Tarek Ismail	Egypt	70.34	68.76	66.85	70.34	PB
20	A	Oleg Romanov	Russia	70.10	66.58	x	70.10	
21	A	Humberto Mansilla	Chile	x	70.04	x	70.04	
22	B	Abdurauf Musoev	Tajikistan	68.92	69.79	x	69.79	PB
23	B	Gleb Volik	Russia	69.71	x	69.34	69.71	
24	B	Chris Arnoldsson	Sweden	65.31	69.18	x	69.18	
25	A	Fellan McGuigan	Ireland	68.75	x	68.94	68.94	
26	A	Andriy Kozyr	Ukraine	66.89	68.71	68.53	68.71	
27	B	Ioannis Beikos	Greece	65.70	x	66.85	66.85	
28	B	Pedro Macías	Mexico	64.43	x	64.81	64.81	
29	A	Xavier Colmenárez	Venezuela	x	60.79	63.88	63.88	
30	A	Jan Lokar	Slovenia	59.72	63.63	63.18	63.63	
31	B	Prakash Singh	India	61.66	62.02	61.01	62.02	
32	B	Jaroslav Lauterkranc	Czech Republic	61.89	x	x	61.89	
33	A	Burak Meriç Kizildağ	Turkey	61.27	x	x	61.27	
34	B	Jan Pustavrh	Slovenia	x	55.57	x	55.57	
	A	Alexios Prodanas	Greece	x	x	x	NM	
	B	Joaquín Gómez	Argentina	x	x	x	NM	
	A	Karol Koncoš	Slovakia	x	x	x	NM	
	A	Tiziano Di Blasio	Greece	x	x	x	NM	
	A	Santiago Sasiaín	Paraguay				DNS	

== Final ==
Rank	Name	Nationality	#1	#2	#3	#4	#5	#6	Result	Notes
1st place, gold medalist(s)	Matija Gregurić	Croatia	76.19	76.62	x	x	78.37	79.38	79.38	PB
2nd place, silver medalist(s)	Pavel Paliakou	Belarus	x	77.05	78.45	77.92	77.60	79.02	79.02	PB
3rd place, bronze medalist(s)	Matthew Denny	Australia	77.66	77.37	x	x	78.67	x	78.67	
4	Raman Zholudzeu	Belarus	74.44	76.34	77.17	76.06	78.55	78.03	78.55	PB
5	Ahmed Amgad El-Seify	Egypt	74.20	73.02	75.57	77.33	74.26	72.59	77.33	PB
6	Tshepang Makhethe	South Africa	75.54	75.27	x	73.02	75.00	74.74	75.54	PB
7	Bence Halász	Hungary	74.90	x	x	x	x	x	74.90	
8	Miguel Blanco	Spain	x	71.21	74.55	74.58	x	x	74.58	SB
9	Alexei Mikhailov	Germany	x	x	73.21				73.21	
10	Volodymyr Myslyvčuk	Ukraine	71.39	72.30	72.42				72.42	
11	Matthew Bloxham	New Zealand	71.77	x	x				71.77	
12	Colin Minor	United States	64.88	70.97	69.78				70.97	
	Gabriel Kehr	Chile	x	x	x				NM	
