= 2022 European Athletics Championships – Men's hammer throw =

Men's hammer throw at the 2022 European Athletics Championships
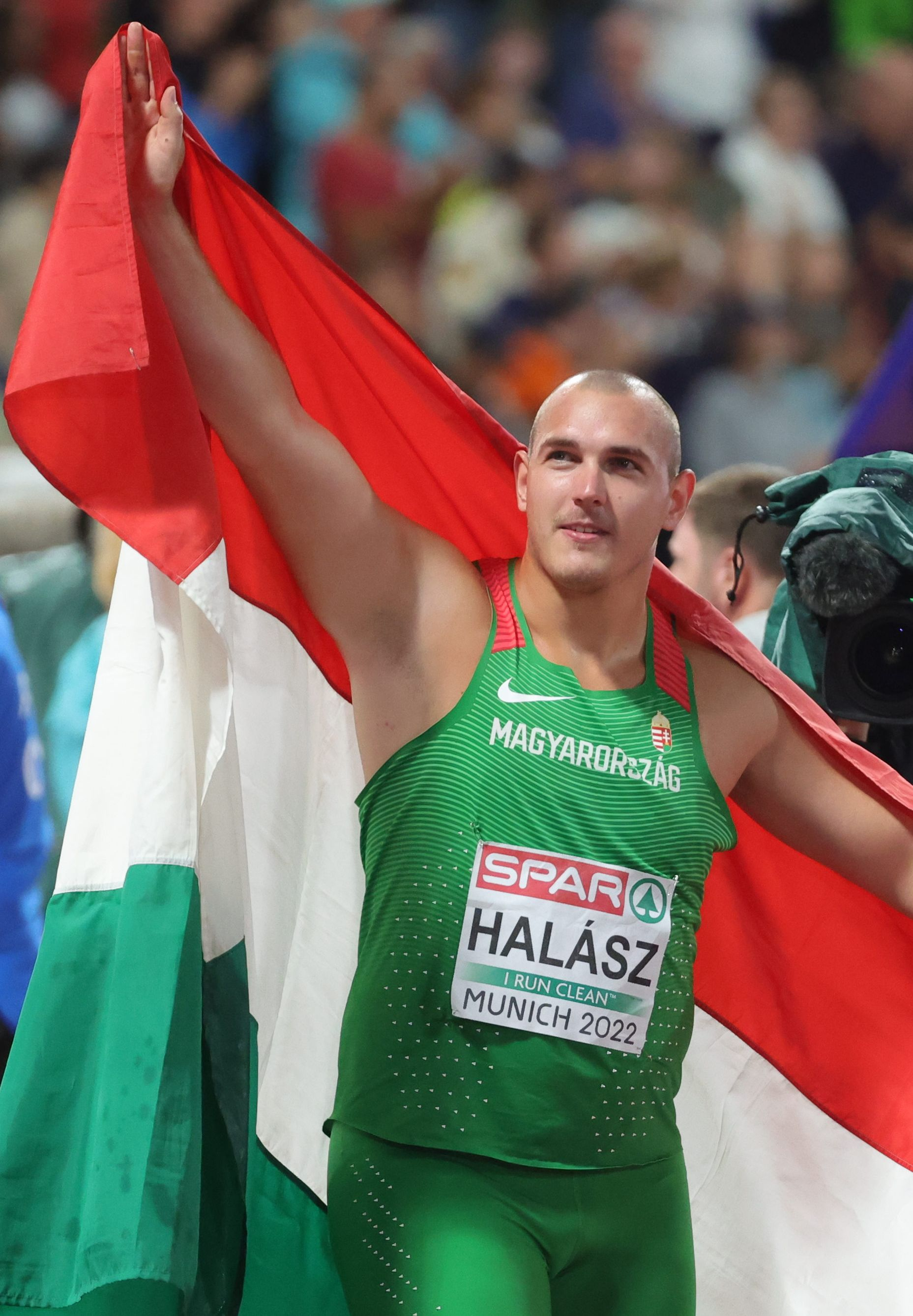
- Venue: Olympiastadion
- Location: Munich
- Dates: August 17 (qualification); August 18 (final)
- Competitors: 26 from 15 nations
- Winning distance: 82.00

Medalists
gold medal	Wojciech Nowicki	Poland
silver medal	Bence Halász	Hungary
bronze medal	Eivind Henriksen	Norway

The men's hammer throw at the 2022 European Athletics Championships took place at the Olympiastadion on 17 and 18 August.

== Records ==
Standing records prior to the 2022 European Athletics Championships
World record	Yuriy Sedykh (URS)	86.74 m	Stuttgart, West Germany	30 August 1986
European record	Yuriy Sedykh (URS)	86.74 m	Stuttgart, West Germany	30 August 1986
Championship record	Yuriy Sedykh (URS)	86.74 m	Stuttgart, West Germany	30 August 1986
World Leading	Paweł Fajdek (POL)	81.98 m	Eugene, United States	16 July 2022
Europe Leading	Paweł Fajdek (POL)	81.98 m	Eugene, United States	16 July 2022

== Schedule ==
Date	Time	Round
17 August 2022	9:35	Qualification
18 August 2022	20:40	Final

All times are local times (UTC+2)

== Results ==
=== Qualification ===
Qualification: 77.50 m (Q) or best 12 performers (q)

Rank	Group	Name	Nationality	#1	#2	#3	Result	Note
1	B	Paweł Fajdek	Poland	75.78	79.76		79.76	Q
2	A	Wojciech Nowicki	Poland	78.78			78.78	Q
3	B	Mykhaylo Kokhan	Ukraine	75.08	75.48	77.85	77.85	Q
4	B	Bence Halász	Hungary	77.72			77.72	Q
5	B	Eivind Henriksen	Norway	77.27	x	–	77.27	q
6	A	Quentin Bigot	France	77.22	77.11	–	77.22	q
7	A	Hilmar Örn Jónsson	Iceland	x	72.87	76.33	76.33	q, SB
8	B	Christos Frantzeskakis	Greece	76.33	x	–	76.33	q
9	B	Nick Miller	Great Britain	72.67	76.09	–	76.09	q
10	A	Ragnar Carlsson	Sweden	74.65	x	73.72	74.65	q
11	B	Serghei Marghiev	Moldova	74.26	73.92	73.46	74.26	q
12	A	Javier Cienfuegos	Spain	x	73.26	71.91	73.26	q
13	B	Marcin Wrotyński	Poland	71.86	x	68.03	71.86	
14	A	Dániel Rába	Hungary	70.32	71.59	71.14	71.59	
15	A	Henri Liipola	Finland	x	71.55	71.32	71.55	
16	B	Tuomas Seppänen	Finland	71.24	70.70	68.90	71.24	
17	A	Mykhailo Havryliuk	Ukraine	70.50	71.14	x	71.14	
18	A	Aaron Kangas	Finland	71.08	x	67.60	71.08	
19	A	Mihail Anastasakis	Greece	70.49	70.84	x	70.84	
20	B	Jean-Baptiste Bruxelle	France	x	70.79	69.81	70.79	
21	B	Alexandros Poursanidis	Cyprus	x	66.70	70.56	70.56	
22	A	Özkan Baltacı	Turkey	67.84	70.34	x	70.34	
23	B	Denzel Comenentia	Netherlands	x	68.89	x	68.89	
24	A	Thomas Mardal	Norway	x	68.55	68.56	68.56	
	A	Yann Chaussinand	France	x	x	x	NM	
	A	Krisztián Pars	Hungary	x	x	x	NM	

=== Final ===
Rank	Name	Nationality	#1	#2	#3	#4	#5	#6	Result	Note
1st place, gold medalist(s)	Wojciech Nowicki	Poland	78.95	80.90	80.91	80.66	82.00	x	82.00	WL
2nd place, silver medalist(s)	Bence Halász	Hungary	78.20	78.26	80.92	x	78.46	x	80.92	PB
3rd place, bronze medalist(s)	Eivind Henriksen	Norway	x	77.60	x	79.45	78.18	77.88	79.45	
4	Paweł Fajdek	Poland	x	x	78.43	78.49	79.03	79.15	79.15	
5	Mykhaylo Kokhan	Ukraine	78.48	x	77.09	x	x	x	78.48	
6	Christos Frantzeskakis	Greece	71.76	75.79	76.92	74.84	x	78.20	78.20	PB
7	Quentin Bigot	France	75.23	x	x	75.48	76.67	77.48	77.48	
8	Nick Miller	Great Britain	75.92	75.89	x	x	75.35	77.29	77.29	SB
9	Ragnar Carlsson	Sweden	x	69.51	74.00				74.00	
10	Serghei Marghiev	Moldova	73.89	72.88	73.75				73.89	
11	Javier Cienfuegos	Spain	71.96	72.18	73.06				73.06	
12	Hilmar Örn Jónsson	Iceland	x	70.03	x				70.03	
