= 2017 World Youth Championships in Athletics – Boys' hammer throw =

The Boys' hammer throw at the 2017 World Youth Championships in Athletics was held on 12 and 14 July.

== Medalists ==
Gold	Silver	Bronze

== Records ==
Prior to the competition, the following records were as follows.

World Youth Best	Bence Halász (HUN)	87.16 m	Baku, Azerbaijan	31 May 2014
Championship Record	Hlib Piskunov (UKR)	84.91 m	Cali, Colombia	17 July 2015
World Youth Leading	Mykhaylo Kokhan (UKR)	84.25 m	Dnipro, Ukraine	10 June 2017

== Qualification ==
Qualification rule: 72.00 m (Q) or at least 12 best (q) performers.

Rank	Group	Name	Nationality	#1	#2	#3	Mark	Notes	Points
	A	Dorin Juncu	Moldova						
	A	Mykhaylo Kokhan	Ukraine						
	A	Ali Hesham Mohamed Ahmed	Egypt						
	A	Damneet Singh	India						
	A	Vladut Gabriel Caus	Romania						
	A	Dzianis Shabasau	Belarus						
	A	Daniel Danác	Slovakia						
	A	Liu Yuxuan	China						
	A	Oliver Tomann	Germany						
	B	Batuhan Hizal	Turkey						
	B	Wang Qi	China						
	B	Juan Pablo Bacotti	Argentina						
	B	Uladzislau Trambovich	Belarus						
	B	Bohdan Potrus	Ukraine						
	B	Nitesh Poonia	India						
	B	Victor Kiplimo	Kenya						
	B	Mohamed Tarek Ismail Mahmoud	Egypt						
	B	Raphael Winkelvoss	Germany						
