= 2026 World Athletics Ultimate Championship – Men's hammer throw =

Men's hammer throw at the 2026 World Athletics Ultimate Championship
- Venue: National Athletics Centre
- Location: Budapest, Hungary
- Dates: 11 September 2026 (final)
- Competitors: 8 from 8 nations
- Winning time: 81.46 m

Champion
- Merlin Hummel; Germany

The men's hammer throw was held as a straight final at the 2026 World Athletics Ultimate Championship at the National Athletics Centre in Budapest, Hungary on 11 September 2026. It was the first time the World Ultimate Championship is held. Athletes qualified by wildcard or by their world ranking.

== Background ==
Global records before the 2026 World Athletics Ultimate Championship
Record	Distance	Athlete (nation)	Location	Date
World record	86.74 m	Yuriy Sedykh (URS)	Stuttgart, West Germany	30 August 1986
World lead	84.25 m	Bence Halász (HUN)	Birmingham, United Kingdom	11 August 2026

Area records before the 2026 World Athletics Ultimate Championship
Record	Distance	Athlete (nation)	Location	Date
African record	81.27 m	Mostafa Elgamel (EGY)	Cairo, Egypt	21 March 2014
Asian record	84.86 m	Koji Murofushi (JPN)	Prague, Czech Republic	29 June 2003
European record	86.74 m	Yuriy Sedykh (URS)	Stuttgart, West Germany	30 August 1986
North, Central American, and Caribbean record	84.70 m	Ethan Katzberg (CAN)	Tokyo, Japan	16 September 2025
Oceanian record	79.29 m	Stuart Rendell (AUS)	Varaždin, Croatia	6 July 2002
South American record	78.63 m	Wagner Domingos (BRA)	Celje, Slovenia	19 June 2016

== Qualification ==
For the hammer throw, eight athletes qualified, up to three by wildcard for winners of the event at the 2024 Summer Olympic, the 2025 World Athletics Championships, or the 2026 Diamond League final and the others by their position at the World Athletics Rankings for the event on 3 September 2026.

== Results ==
=== Final ===
The final was held on 12 September at 19:23 (UTC+2).

Place	Athlete	Nation	Round				Result	Notes
Place	Athlete	Nation	#1	#2	#3	#4	Result	Notes
1st place, gold medalist(s)	Merlin Hummel	Germany	81.46	x	81.44	x	81.46 m	
2	Bence Halász	Hungary	80.30	x	x	x	80.30 m	
3	Mykhaylo Kokhan	Ukraine	73.18	78.50	78.90	77.60	78.90 m	
4	Yann Chaussinand	France	78.36	x	x	x	78.36 m	
5	Volodymyr Myslyvčuk	Czech Republic	73.12	78.19	77.30		78.19 m	
6	Paweł Fajdek	Poland	73.98	76.11	x		76.11 m	
7	Rudy Winkler	United States	75.86	x			75.86 m	
—	Ethan Katzberg	Canada	x	x			NM	
