= Donát Varga =

Hungarian athlete

Personal information
- Nationality: Hungarian
- Born: 8 April 2000 (age 26)

Sport
- Sport: Athletics
- Event: Hammer throw

Achievements and titles
- Personal bests: Hammer: 75.26m (Budapest, 2023)

Donát Varga (born 8 April 2000) is a Hungarian hammer thrower. He competed at the 2023 World Athletics Championships and the 2024 Olympic Games.

== Career ==
He is a member of Szombathelyi Dobó SE where he is a teammate of Bence Halasz and Dániel Rába, coached by Zsolt Németh and László Németh. He finished fourth at the 2019 European Athletics U20 Championships in the hammer throw in Borås, Sweden. He finished third at the 2022 Hungarian Athletics Championships, behind his club teammates Halasz, and Rába, with a throw of 73.71 metres.

He was runner-up to Bence Halász at the 2023 Hungarian Athletics Championships with a throw of 75.26 metres in Budapest. He was subsequently selected to compete at the home 2023 World Athletics Championships in Budapest in the hammer throw, throwing 72.02 metres without processing to the final.

He competed in the 2024 European Championships in Rome, Italy, in the hammer throw, throwing 70.78 meters which was not enough to qualify for the final. At the end of that month, he finished third at the 2024 Hungarian Athletics Championships with a distance of 71.13 metres. He competed in the hammer throw at the 2024 Olympic Games in Paris, France, throwing 71.65 metres with his best throw which was not enough to qualify for the final.

== Personal life ==
He was ruled out of action for a number of weeks during the 2021 season after he had to have his gallbladder removed in emergency surgery. To help his mental recovery from the surgery he used a sports psychologist, Lilla Gurisatti, herself from a high achieving sporting family.
