= 2024 European Athletics Championships – Men's hammer throw =

Men's hammer throw at the 2024 European Athletics Championships
- Venue: Stadio Olimpico
- Location: Rome
- Dates: 8 June (qualification); 9 June (final)
- Competitors: 30 from 18 nations
- Winning time: 80.98

Medalists
gold medal	Wojciech Nowicki	Poland
silver medal	Bence Halász	Hungary
bronze medal	Mykhaylo Kokhan	Ukraine

The men's hammer throw at the 2024 European Athletics Championships took place at the Stadio Olimpico on 8 and 9 June.

== Records ==
Standing records prior to the 2024 European Athletics Championships
World record	Yuriy Sedykh (URS)	86.74 m	Stuttgart, West Germany	30 August 1986
European record	Yuriy Sedykh (URS)	86.74 m	Stuttgart, West Germany	30 August 1986
Championship record	Yuriy Sedykh (URS)	86.74 m	Stuttgart, West Germany	30 August 1986
World Leading	Ethan Katzberg (CAN)	84.38 m	Nairobi, Kenya	20 April 2024
Europe Leading	Valeriy Pronkin (RUS)	81.53 m	Sochi, Russia	21 May 2024

== Schedule ==
Date	Time	Round
8 June 2024	10:05	Qualification
9 June 2024	21:11	Final

All times are local times (UTC+2)

== Results ==
=== Qualification ===
Qualification: 77.00 m (Q) or best 12 performers (q)

Rank	Group	Name	Nationality	#1	#2	#3	Result	Note
1	A	Wojciech Nowicki	Poland	76.66	79.00		79.00	Q
2	B	Bence Halász	Hungary	77.84			77.84	Q, SB
3	B	Mykhaylo Kokhan	Ukraine	77.77			77.77	Q
4	A	Yann Chaussinand	France	76.84	x	x	76.84	q
5	B	Jake Norris	Great Britain	75.69	75.73	–	75.73	q
6	A	Merlin Hummel	Germany	73.73	75.73	x	75.73	q
7	A	Eivind Henriksen	Norway	75.21	75.32	75.49	75.49	q, SB
8	A	Matija Gregurić	Croatia	73.74	74.65	75.42	75.42	q, PB
9	B	Quentin Bigot	France	74.18	74.84	75.29	75.29	q
10	B	Serghei Marghiev	Moldova	73.55	74.85	75.18	75.18	q
11	A	Paweł Fajdek	Poland	x	74.52	75.17	75.17	q
12	A	Konstantinos Zaltos	Greece	74.49	70.80	72.02	74.49	q
13	B	Adam Kelly	Estonia	71.40	73.92	71.08	73.92	
14	A	Michail Anastasakis	Greece	70.80	73.60	72.55	73.60	
15	B	Marcin Wrotyński	Poland	x	66.46	73.58	73.58	
16	B	Denzel Comenentia	Netherlands	72.35	73.45	73.31	73.45	
17	A	Volodymyr Myslyvčuk	Czech Republic	x	73.43	x	73.43	
18	B	Christos Frantzeskakis	Greece	72.92	x	73.11	73.11	
19	B	Sören Klose	Germany	72.35	72.96	72.79	72.96	
20	B	Tuomas Seppänen	Finland	68.30	70.31	72.85	72.85	
21	B	Patrik Hájek	Czech Republic	71.49	72.72	70.82	72.72	
22	A	Ragnar Carlsson	Sweden	72.53	71.11	x	72.53	
23	A	Dániel Rába	Hungary	x	72.52	x	72.52	
24	A	Hilmar Örn Jónsson	Iceland	x	72.05	x	72.05	
25	A	Özkan Baltacı	Turkey	70.73	x	71.58	71.58	
26	A	Aaron Kangas	Finland	71.58	x	x	71.58	
27	B	Dawid Piłat	Poland	69.98	71.44	69.13	71.44	
28	B	Thomas Mardal	Norway	x	71.16	x	71.16	
29	B	Donát Varga	Hungary	70.78	x	70.52	70.78	
30	A	Marcel Lomnický	Slovakia	68.15	67.98	67.35	68.15	

=== Final ===
The final started on 9 June at 21:10.

Rank	Name	Nationality	#1	#2	#3	#4	#5	#6	Result	Note
1st place, gold medalist(s)	Wojciech Nowicki	Poland	78.61	80.14	79.06	79.18	77.56	80.95	80.95	SB
2nd place, silver medalist(s)	Bence Halász	Hungary	72.74	77.99	78.55	80.49	x	77.71	80.49	SB
3rd place, bronze medalist(s)	Mykhaylo Kokhan	Ukraine	76.06	78.45	80.10	78.31	80.18	x	80.18	
4	Merlin Hummel	Germany	71.51	78.85	x	x	x	79.25	79.25	EU23L
5	Yann Chaussinand	France	78.37	76.05	x	75.69	x	x	78.37	
6	Paweł Fajdek	Poland	75.88	77.26	75.45	x	77.50	76.60	77.50	SB
7	Eivind Henriksen	Norway	75.55	76.51	x	75.54	x	73.42	76.51	SB
8	Matija Gregurić	Croatia	x	75.47	74.70	x	73.19	73.30	75.47	PB
9	Quentin Bigot	France	73.31	72.84	73.81				73.81	
10	Jake Norris	Great Britain	71.52	x	73.66				73.66	
11	Serghei Marghiev	Moldova	71.59	73.07	72.95				73.07	
12	Konstantinos Zaltos	Greece	71.94	71.53	72.64				72.64	
