= 2016 IAAF World U20 Championships – Men's hammer throw =

The men's hammer throw event at the 2016 IAAF World U20 Championships was held at Zdzisław Krzyszkowiak Stadium on 20 and 22 July.

== Medalists ==
Gold	Bence Halász; Hungary
Silver	Hlib Piskunov; Ukraine
Bronze	Aleksi Jaakkola; Finland

== Records ==
Standing records prior to the 2016 IAAF World U20 Championships in Athletics
World Junior Record	Ashraf Amgad Elseify (QAT)	85.57	Barcelona, Spain	14 July 2012
Championship Record	Ashraf Amgad Elseify (QAT)	85.57	Barcelona, Spain	14 July 2012
World Junior Leading	Bence Halász (HUN)	82.64	Szombathely, Hungary	25 June 2016

== Results ==
=== Qualification ===
Qualification: 72.00 (Q) or at least 12 best performers (q) qualified for the final.

Rank	Group	Name	Nationality	#1	#2	#3	Result	Note
1	A	Bence Halász	Hungary	77.86			77.86	Q
2	A	Hlib Piskunov	Ukraine	76.15			76.15	Q
3	B	Aliaksandr Shymanovich	Belarus	75.81			75.81	Q, PB
4	B	Dániel Rába	Hungary	75.09			75.09	Q
5	B	Aleksi Jaakkola	Finland	75.06			75.06	Q
6	A	Alberto González	Spain	x	69.19	74.29	74.29	Q, PB
7	B	Ahmed Tarek Ismail	Egypt	x	x	72.69	72.69	Q
8	B	Adam Patrick King	Ireland	71.60	x	70.03	71.60	q, NU20R
9	B	Ned Weatherly	Australia	71.08	71.18	x	71.18	q
10	A	Robert Colantonio Jr.	United States	64.74	67.81	71.00	71.00	q
11	B	Adam Kelly	United States	69.75	70.98	67.43	70.98	q
12	A	Aaron Kangas	Finland	70.64	x	x	70.64	q
13	A	Owen Russell	Ireland	68.14	66.52	70.34	70.34	
14	A	Tomas Vasiliauskas	Lithuania	66.81	65.86	68.98	68.98	
15	A	Mihaita Andrei Micu	Romania	66.25	67.38	66.77	67.38	
16	A	Alexios Prodanas	Greece	66.75	64.91	64.68	66.75	
17	B	Ashish Jakhar	India	65.92	66.73	x	66.73	
18	B	Florin Constantin Coman	Romania	x	x	65.92	65.92	
19	A	Nathan Wilkins	Australia	x	65.32	x	65.32	
20	B	Josef Egrt	Czech Republic	63.00	64.81	x	64.81	
21	A	Alejandro Medina	Paraguay	62.18	63.13	x	63.13	
22	B	Xavier Colmenarez	Venezuela	x	62.12	63.05	63.05	
23	A	Patrik Hájek	Czech Republic	58.49	x	59.63	59.63	
24	B	Hussein Al-Bayati	Iraq	56.20	x	x	56.20	

=== Final ===
Rank	Name	Nationality	#1	#2	#3	#4	Result	Note
1st place, gold medalist(s)	Bence Halász	Hungary	73.12	78.74	80.93	x	80.93	
2nd place, silver medalist(s)	Hlib Piskunov	Ukraine	78.77	79.58	x	75.83	79.58	PB
3rd place, bronze medalist(s)	Aleksi Jaakkola	Finland	x	77.88	76.39	75.79	77.88	
4	Dániel Rába	Hungary	73.31	76.71	x	74.72	76.71	
5	Alberto González	Spain	75.52	x	x	x	75.52	PB
6	Ahmed Tarek Ismail	Egypt	x	x	74.42	x	74.42	
7	Ned Weatherly	Australia	x	73.75	x		73.75	PB
8	Adam Kelly	United States	70.74	71.82	73.17		73.17	PB
9	Aaron Kangas	Finland	67.78	70.55	72.64		72.64	
10	Aliaksandr Shymanovich	Belarus	70.82	72.29	x		72.29	
11	Adam Patrick King	Ireland	x	71.70	70.69		71.70	NU20R
12	Robert Colantonio Jr.	United States	x	69.23	66.64		69.23	
