= 2023 World Athletics Championships – Men's hammer throw =

2023 sporting event

Men's hammer throw at the 2023 World Championships
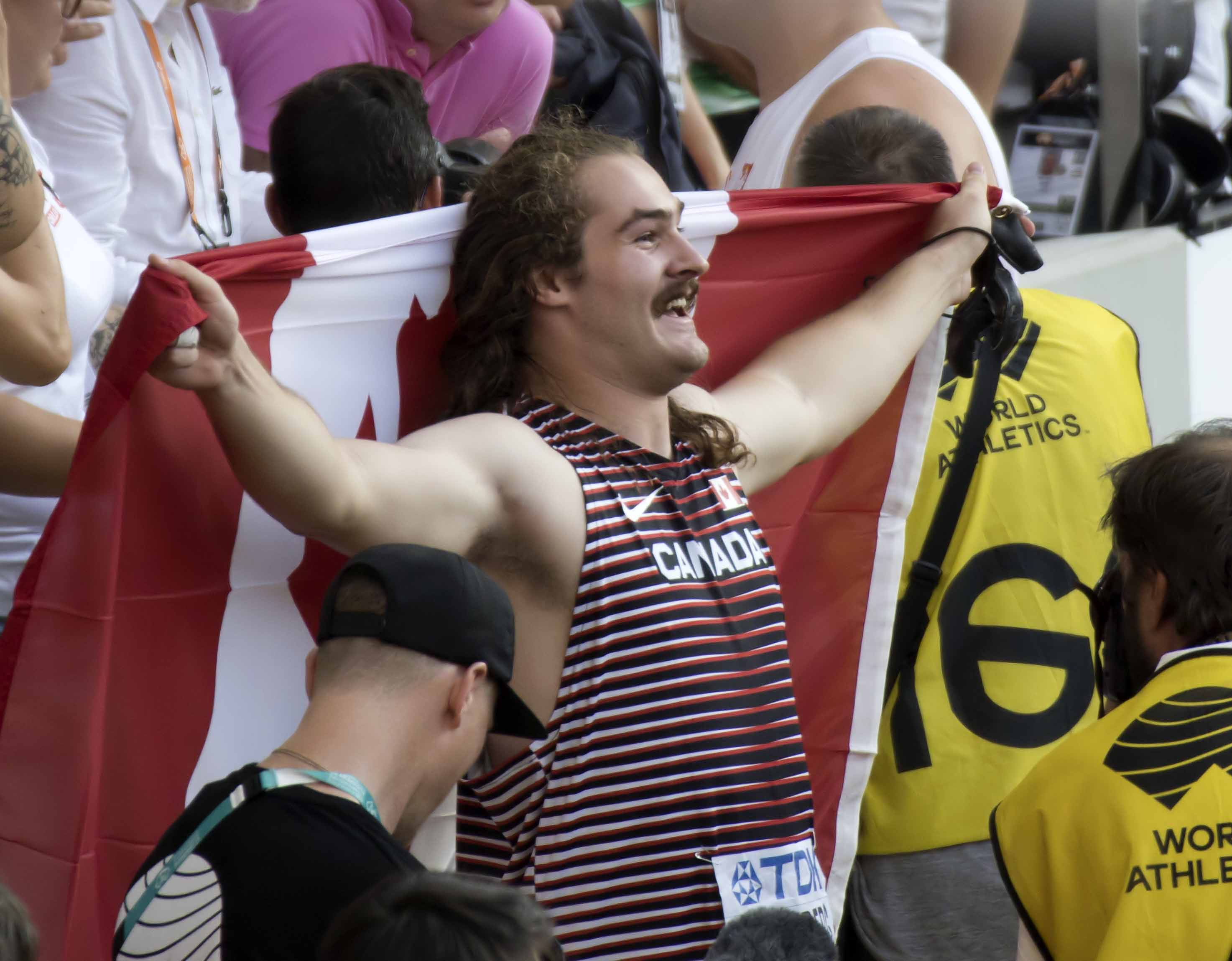
- Ethan Katzberg shortly after the final.
- Venue: National Athletics Centre
- Dates: 19 August (Qualification); 20 August (Final)
- Competitors: 35 from 22 nations
- Winning distance: 81.25

Medalists
gold medal	Ethan Katzberg	Canada
silver medal	Wojciech Nowicki	Poland
bronze medal	Bence Halász	Hungary

The men's hammer throw at the 2023 World Athletics Championships was held at the National Athletics Centre in Budapest on 19 and 20 August 2023.

== Summary ==
Ethan Katzberg arrived at these championships with a respectable personal best of 78.73m set earlier in the season. As the fourth thrower in the preliminary rounds, he threw an 81.18m National Record, while no other athlete cleared 78.50 in the preliminaries.

Five time defending champion Paweł Fajdek started off the finals with an exact 80 metre throw. With the home crowd cheering, Bence Halász took the lead with an 80.82m. Katzberg closed off the first round with an 80.18m. In the second round, Olympic Champion Wojciech Nowicki knocked his teammate Fajdek off the podium with an 80.70m. He improved that to 80.83m in the fourth round to knock Halász off the top by a single cm. In the fifth round, Katzberg jumped into the lead with an 81.25 m (266 ft 6 in). On the next throw, Nowicki improved, but 81.02m wasn't enough to get back to the lead. Neither were able to improve in the final round, but Katzberg's 81.11m would have also won the competition.

Through two days of competition, Katzberg landed 6 legal throws, all of them more than a metre longer than he had ever thrown before. He took home a World Championship and set his National Record twice. He became the first athlete from NACAC to win a medal at a Men's Hammer throw in the World Athletics Championships.

== Records ==
Before the competition records were as follows:

Record	Athlete & Nat.	Perf.	Location	Date
World record	Yuriy Sedykh (URS)	86.74 m	Stuttgart, West Germany	30 August 1986
Championship record	Ivan Tsikhan (BLR)	83.63 m	Osaka, Japan	27 August 2007
World Leading	Wojciech Nowicki (POL)	81.92 m	Oslo, Norway	15 June 2023
African Record	Mostafa Elgamel (EGY)	81.27 m	Cairo, Egypt	21 March 2014
Asian Record	Koji Murofushi (JPN)	84.86 m	Prague, Czech Republic	29 June 2003
North, Central American and Caribbean record	Rudy Winkler (USA)	82.71 m	Eugene, United States	20 June 2021
South American Record	Wagner Domingos (BRA)	78.63 m	Celje, Slovenia	19 June 2016
European Record	Yuriy Sedykh (URS)	86.74 m	Stuttgart, West Germany	30 August 1986
Oceanian record	Stuart Rendell (AUS)	79.29 m	Varaždin, Croatia	6 July 2002

The following records were established during the competition:

Date	Event	Name	Nationality	Distance	Record
19 August	Qualification	Ethan Katzberg	Canada	81.18	NR
20 August	Final	Ethan Katzberg	Canada	81.25	NR

== Qualification standard ==
The standard to qualify automatically for entry was 78.00.

== Schedule ==
The event schedule, in local time (CEST), was as follows:

Date	Time	Round
19 August	13:00	Qualification
19 August	14:45	Qualification
20 August	17:49	Final

== Results ==
=== Qualification ===
Qualification: Qualifying Performance 77.00 (Q) or at least 12 best performers (q) advanced to the final.

Rank	Group	Name	Nationality	Round			Mark	Notes
Rank	Group	Name	Nationality	1	2	3	Mark	Notes
1	A	Ethan Katzberg	Canada	81.18			81.18	Q, NR
2	B	Mykhaylo Kokhan	Ukraine	76.59	78.47		78.47	Q
3	A	Bence Halász	Hungary	78.13			78.13	Q
4	A	Wojciech Nowicki	Poland	78.04			78.04	Q
5	B	Paweł Fajdek	Poland	77.98			77.98	Q
6	B	Rudy Winkler	United States	75.37	77.06		77.06	Q
7	A	Daniel Haugh	United States	x	x	76.64	76.64	q
8	B	Michail Anastasakis	Greece	x	73.43	75.76	75.76	q
9	B	Eivind Henriksen	Norway	71.61	74.37	75.37	75.37	q
10	A	Gabriel Kehr	Chile	75.10	72.88	73.63	75.10	q
11	B	Diego del Real	Mexico	73.28	74.91	73.30	74.91	q
12	A	Adam Keenan	Canada	74.56	72.97	73.32	74.56	q
13	B	Rowan Hamilton	Canada	71.81	70.42	74.14	74.14	
14	A	Christos Frantzeskakis	Greece	74.05	73.30	x	74.05	
15	B	Dániel Rába	Hungary	x	71.93	73.17	73.17	SB
16	A	Thomas Mardal	Norway	72.40	73.13	72.62	73.13	
17	B	Aaron Kangas	Finland	x	72.15	72.96	72.96	
18	B	Serghei Marghiev	Moldova	72.91	68.76	71.50	72.91	
19	A	Jerome Vega	Puerto Rico	71.61	x	72.87	72.87	
20	B	Humberto Mansilla	Chile	72.32	72.80	72.01	72.80	
21	B	Joaquín Gómez	Argentina	68.66	72.77	68.57	72.77	
22	A	Sören Klose	Germany	72.23	x	x	72.23	
23	B	Yann Chaussinand	France	x	72.17	x	72.17	
24	B	Ragnar Carlsson	Sweden	70.94	72.02	x	72.02	
25	B	Donát Varga	Hungary	x	x	72.02	72.02	
26	B	Ronald Mencía	Cuba	71.72	70.74	x	71.72	
27	A	Alexandros Poursanidis	Cyprus	71.63	x	71.58	71.63	
28	B	Mostafa Elgamel	Egypt	x	71.36	x	71.36	
29	A	Denzel Comenentia	Netherlands	69.46	x	70.16	70.16	
30	A	Konstantinos Zaltos	Greece	69.98	x	69.67	69.98	
31	A	Alex Young	United States	69.10	x	67.40	69.10	
32	A	Patrik Hájek	Czech Republic	67.36	66.30	68.77	68.77	
33	A	Marcin Wrotyński	Poland	67.57	x	68.65	68.65	
	B	Merlin Hummel	Germany	x	x	x	NM	
	A	Hilmar Örn Jónsson	Iceland	x	x	x	NM	

=== Final ===
The final was started on 20 August at 17:52.

Rank	Name	Nationality	Round						Mark	Notes
Rank	Name	Nationality	1	2	3	4	5	6	Mark	Notes
1st place, gold medalist(s)	Ethan Katzberg	Canada	80.18	80.02	x	79.82	81.25	81.11	81.25	NR
2nd place, silver medalist(s)	Wojciech Nowicki	Poland	79.14	80.70	78.94	80.83	81.02	80.36	81.02	
3rd place, bronze medalist(s)	Bence Halász	Hungary	80.82	x	x	80.59	79.94	x	80.82	SB
4	Paweł Fajdek	Poland	80.00	x	77.06	x	x	77.99	80.00	SB
5	Mykhaylo Kokhan	Ukraine	x	77.41	79.34	78.37	79.59	79.52	79.59	SB
6	Daniel Haugh	United States	76.07	77.38	75.66	78.64	74.83	x	78.64	SB
7	Eivind Henriksen	Norway	75.85	77.06	x	x	76.81	x	77.06	SB
8	Rudy Winkler	United States	x	x	76.04	x	75.83	x	76.04	
9	Gabriel Kehr	Chile	75.99	75.54	74.24				75.99	
10	Michail Anastasakis	Greece	74.62	73.04	75.49				75.49	
11	Adam Keenan	Canada	74.49	73.96	72.58				74.49	
12	Diego del Real	Mexico	72.39	71.84	72.56				72.56	
