= 2017 European Athletics U23 Championships – Men's hammer throw =

The men's hammer throw event at the 2017 European Athletics U23 Championships was held in Bydgoszcz, Poland, at Zdzisław Krzyszkowiak Stadium on 13 and 14 July.

== Medalists ==
Gold	Bence Halász; Hungary
Silver	Bence Pásztor; Hungary
Bronze	Alexej Mikhailov; Germany

== Results ==
=== Qualification ===
13 July

Qualification rule: 67.50 (Q) or the 12 best results (q) qualified for the final.

Rank	Group	Name	Nationality	#1	#2	#3	Results	Notes
1	B	Bence Pásztor	Hungary	70.22			70.22	Q
2	A	Bence Halász	Hungary	70.14			70.14	Q
3	A	Miguel Alberto Blanco	Spain	67.02	68.59		68.59	Q
4	B	Aleksi Jaakkola	Finland	68.50			68.50	Q
5	B	Thomas Mardal	Norway	68.34			68.34	Q, PB
6	A	Alexej Mikhailov	Germany	65.26	68.26		68.26	Q
7	A	Hilmar Örn Jónsson	Iceland	68.09			68.09	Q
8	A	Markus Kokkonen	Finland	67.84			67.84	Q
9	B	Volodymyr Myslyvchuk	Ukraine	66.45	65.50	67.56	67.56	Q
10	B	Taylor Campbell	Great Britain	66.89	x	67.43	67.43	q
11	B	Aaron Kangas	Finland	x	64.78	66.95	66.95	q
12	A	Raman Zholudzeu	Belarus	63.20	66.81	64.56	66.81	q
13	A	Matija Gregurić	Croatia	66.53	65.69	x	66.53	
14	A	Nikolaos Gavriilidis	Greece	x	66.12	66.28	66.28	
15	B	Ivan Menglebei	Greece	x	63.15	66.10	66.10	
16	B	Tim Söderqvist	Sweden	64.00	65.74	62.13	65.74	
17	B	Maksim Mitskou	Belarus	62.84	63.10	64.74	64.74	
18	A	Kevin Arreaga	Spain	x	63.91	61.13	63.91	
19	A	Adam King	Ireland	63.86	62.82	61.40	63.86	
20	B	Viorel Cristian Ravar	Spain	62.43	62.69	63.19	63.19	
21	B	Owen Russell	Ireland	58.73	62.28	57.76	62.28	
22	B	Karol Končoš	Slovakia	x	x	61.57	61.57	
23	A	Tolgahan Yavuz	Turkey	61.30	61.35	61.07	61.35	
24	B	Bálint Horváth	Hungary	59.19	60.85	x	60.85	
25	B	Mykola Lopushenko	Ukraine	59.33	59.58	60.62	60.62	
26	A	Miguel Carreira	Portugal	53.16	56.26	60.39	60.39	
27	A	Giacomo Proserpio	Italy	x	60.32	x	60.32	
28	A	Serhiy Perevoznikov	Ukraine	x	x	60.30	60.30	
29	A	Evald Osnes Devik	Norway	x	51.64	59.97	59.97	
30	B	Tomas Vasiliauskas	Lithuania	58.23	58.20	58.52	58.52	

=== Final ===
14 July

Rank	Name	Nationality	#1	#2	#3	#4	#5	#6	Result	Notes
1st place, gold medalist(s)	Bence Halász	Hungary	68.77	70.60	70.87	x	73.30	71.49	73.30	
2nd place, silver medalist(s)	Bence Pásztor	Hungary	69.41	71.47	71.51	70.15	69.73	58.33	71.51	
3rd place, bronze medalist(s)	Alexej Mikhailov	Germany	69.65	70.26	70.60	68.47	66.29	x	70.60	
4	Taylor Campbell	Great Britain	70.59	x	x	x	69.38	70.25	70.59	
5	Volodymyr Myslyvchuk	Ukraine	69.26	69.36	69.46	70.30	69.90	68.96	70.30	
6	Miguel Alberto Blanco	Spain	66.32	69.02	70.06	66.35	67.32	69.88	70.06	
7	Hilmar Örn Jónsson	Iceland	68.17	69.39	x	69.96	x	66.06	69.96	
8	Markus Kokkonen	Finland	65.69	66.32	68.56	66.63	x	x	68.56	
9	Aleksi Jaakkola	Finland	62.40	68.34	x				68.34	
10	Thomas Mardal	Norway	68.28	66.59	66.96				68.28	
11	Aaron Kangas	Finland	x	65.99	x				65.99	
12	Raman Zholudzeu	Belarus	63.81	64.67	62.54				64.67	
