= Athletics at the 2024 Summer Olympics – Men's hammer throw =

Men's hammer throw at the Games of the XXXIII Olympiad
- Venue: Stade de France, Paris, France
- Date: 2 August 2024 (qualification) 4 August 2024 (final)
- Competitors: 32 from 21 nations
- Winning distance: 84.12 m

Medalists
1st place, gold medalist(s)		Ethan Katzberg	Canada
2nd place, silver medalist(s)		Bence Halász	Hungary
3rd place, bronze medalist(s)		Mykhaylo Kokhan	Ukraine

The men's hammer throw at the 2024 Summer Olympics was held in Paris, France, on 2 and 4 August 2024. This was the 29th time that the event is contested at the Summer Olympics.

== Summary ==
The revelation of 2023 was Ethan Katzberg who had grown from fouling out at the 2021 U20 Championships to winning the 2023 World Championships. At the time the narrow victory over Olympic Champion Wojciech Nowicki may have marked a changing of the guard. Silver medalist Eivind Henriksen and bronze medalist Paweł Fajdek were back but now well over 30, not abnormal for hammer throwers. World Championship bronze medalist Bence Halász is still in his late 20's, but Katzberg is only 22. This season Katzberg dominated the top throws, setting a North American record at 84.38m in April and 8 different competitions over 80. The only other throwers over 80 meters were Nowicki, Fajdek, Halász and Mykhaylo Kokhan, age 23 who threw over 80 five times. A Russian and a Belorussian were not invited to the Olympics.

In the qualifying round, only Rudy Winkler made an auto qualifier of 77 meters on his first attempt. After cleaning up a first round foul, Katzberg led five auto qualifiers. It took 75.25m to get into the final.

In the finals, Nowicki started with a 77.42m, Kokhan topped that with 78.54m and Winkler put himself in position with 77.92m. Then, Katzberg stepped into the ring and launched his first throw of the finals at 84.12 m (275 ft 11 in). It was game over at that point, with the other competitors now having to fight it out for silver and bronze. In the second round, Kokhan improved to 79.39m and Henriksen moved up to 79.18m. In the third round, Halász pushed Henriksen off the podium with a 79.97m, the Katzberg backed up his first throw with an 82.28m. They went through the formality of three more rounds as no other thrower broke 80m, but only Fajdek improved to 78.80m and that only put him in fifth.

Katzberg was the first Canadian to win the Hammer, the first North American since 1956, and only the third non-(former) Soviet Bloc athlete to win since WWII.

== Background ==
The men's hammer throw has been present on the Olympic athletics programme since the second edition in 1900.

Global records before the 2024 Summer Olympics
Record	Athlete (Nation)	Distance (m)	Location	Date
World record	Yuriy Sedykh (URS)	86.74	Stuttgart, West Germany	30 August 1986
Olympic record	Sergey Litvinov (URS)	84.80	Seoul, South Korea	26 September 1988
World leading	Ethan Katzberg (CAN)	84.38	Nairobi, Kenya	20 April 2024

Area records before the 2024 Summer Olympics
Area Record	Athlete (Nation)	Distance (m)
Africa (records)	Mostafa El Gamel (EGY)	81.27
Asia (records)	Koji Murofushi (JPN)	84.86
Europe (records)	Yuriy Sedykh (URS)	86.74 WR
North, Central America and Caribbean (records)	Ethan Katzberg (CAN)	84.38
Oceania (records)	Stuart Rendell (AUS)	79.29
South America (records)	Wagner Domingos (BRA)	78.63

== Qualification ==
For the men's hammer throw event, the qualification period was between 1 July 2023 and 30 June 2024. 32 athletes were able to qualify for the event, with a maximum of three athletes per nation, by throwing the entry standard of 78.20 m or further or by their World Athletics Ranking for this event.

== Results ==
=== Qualification ===
The qualification was held on 2 August, starting at 10:10 (UTC+2) for Group A and 11:35 (UTC+2) for Group B in the morning. 32 athletes qualified for the first round by qualification distance or world ranking. Qualification: 77.00 (Q) or at least 12 best performers (q) advance to the final.

Rank	Group	Athlete	Nation	1	2	3	Distance	Notes
1	B	Ethan Katzberg	Canada	X	79.93		79.93	Q
2	A	Rowan Hamilton	Canada	76.97	X	77.78	77.78	Q, PB
3	A	Mykhaylo Kokhan	Ukraine	X	77.42		77.42	Q
4	B	Rudy Winkler	United States	77.29			77.29	Q
5	B	Eivind Henriksen	Norway	X	77.14		77.14	Q, SB
6	B	Bence Halász	Hungary	76.84	72.89	76.90	76.90	q
7	A	Yann Chaussinand	France	X	75.43	76.86	76.86	q
8	A	Thomas Mardal	Norway	76.16	76.78	73.71	76.78	q
9	B	Pawel Fajdek	Poland	X	X	76.56	76.56	q
10	A	Wojciech Nowicki	Poland	X	76.32	75.50	76.32	q
11	B	Christos Frantzeskakis	Greece	75.53	73.94	74.21	75.53	q
12	B	Merlin Hummel	Germany	75.25	X	X	75.25	q
13	B	Adam Keenan	Canada	X	69.97	74.45	74.45	SB
14	B	Denzel Comenentia	Netherlands	X	72.17	74.31	74.31	
15	A	Ragnar Carlsson	Sweden	72.72	73.96	73.94	73.96	
16	B	Volodymyr Myslyvčuk	Czech Republic	73.84	X	X	73.84	
17	A	Matija Gregurić	Croatia	71.48	72.94	73.69	73.69	
18	A	Serghei Marghiev	Moldova	73.46	X	70.73	73.46	
19	A	Wang Qi	China	65.43	72.52	69.60	72.52	
20	B	Gabriel Kehr	Chile	72.28	72.12	72.31	72.31	
21	B	Dániel Rába	Hungary	71.37	X	72.29	72.29	
22	B	Diego del Real	Mexico	69.39	72.10	X	72.10	
23	B	Joaquín Gómez	Argentina	X	64.94	72.10	72.10	
24	A	Humberto Mansilla	Chile	71.75	71.83	70.81	71.83	
25	A	Donát Varga	Hungary	69.95	71.65	69.71	71.65	
26	B	Jerome Vega	Puerto Rico	69.19	71.61	70.44	71.61	
27	B	Özkan Baltacı	Turkey	X	71.40	71.24	71.40	
28	A	Sören Klose	Germany	71.20	X	X	71.20	
29	A	Mihail Anastasakis	Greece	X	70.14	X	70.14	
30	A	Mostafa El Gamel	Egypt	68.12	68.65	70.09	70.09	
31	A	Patrik Hájek	Czech Republic	67.96	68.45	68.80	68.80	
	A	Daniel Haugh	United States	X	X	X	NM	

=== Final ===
The final was held on 4 August, starting at 20:30 (UTC+2) in the evening.

Rank	Athlete	Nation	1	2	3	4	5	6	Distance	Notes
1st place, gold medalist(s)	Ethan Katzberg	Canada	84.12	X	82.28	X	X	X	84.12	
2nd place, silver medalist(s)	Bence Halász	Hungary	77.58	78.84	79.97	79.94	77.66	79.82	79.97	
3rd place, bronze medalist(s)	Mykhaylo Kokhan	Ukraine	78.54	79.39	X	78.17	76.53	79.24	79.39	
4	Eivind Henriksen	Norway	76.45	79.18	X	X	76.11	X	79.18	SB
5	Pawel Fajdek	Poland	78.01	77.22	78.57	78.80	X	76.64	78.80	
6	Rudy Winkler	United States	77.92	X	X	X	71.90	X	77.92	
7	Wojciech Nowicki	Poland	77.42	77.28	76.75	77.03	X	75.92	77.42	
8	Yann Chaussinand	France	X	X	77.38	77.15	X	X	77.38	
9	Rowan Hamilton	Canada	76.59	X	X	Did not advance			76.59	
10	Merlin Hummel	Germany	74.85	76.03	X	Did not advance			76.03	
11	Thomas Mardal	Norway	74.25	73.68	X	Did not advance			74.25	
12	Christos Frantzeskakis	Greece	X	73.34	X	Did not advance			73.34	
