= 2022 World Athletics Championships – Men's hammer throw =

Men's hammer throw at the 2022 World Championships
- Venue: Hayward Field
- Dates: 15 July (qualification); 16 July (final)
- Competitors: 32 from 21 nations
- Winning distance: 81.98

Medalists
gold medal	Paweł Fajdek	Poland
silver medal	Wojciech Nowicki	Poland
bronze medal	Eivind Henriksen	Norway

The men's hammer throw at the 2022 World Athletics Championships was held at the Hayward Field in Eugene on 15 and 16 July 2022.

== Summary ==
Back in 2011, Paweł Fajdek finished 11th and last in the final. Since then, the results have been the same, Paweł Fajdek World Champion. He was back for another spin.

In the first round, Rudy Winkler was the first to throw over 78 with a 78.91m. Quentin Bigot threw 79.52m to take the lead and Bence Halász was in second with 79.12m. Seven throwers were over 77 metres while Fajdek only managed 74.71m to find himself in a non-qualifying 9th place. Leading off the second round, Olympic Champion and World Leader Wojciech Nowicki threw 80.07m to take the lead. Then Fajdek put one out to 80.58m, that's more like it. Then the next thrower Eivind Henriksen pushed him to second position by throwing an 80.87m. Nowicki led off the third round with an 81.03m to take the lead. Later Fajdek threw 81.98 m (268 ft 11 in) to take the lead back. Bigot and Halász both threw beyond 80 metres in the third round. And that decided the medals. Nobody threw over 80 the rest of the finals.

For the fifth time in a row, Fajdek won the Championships, to become the first five time gold medalist. Shelly-Ann Fraser-Pryce would duplicate the feat, non-consecutively at 100m the following day.

== Records ==
Before the competition records were as follows:

Record	Athlete & Nat.	Perf.	Location	Date
World record	Yuriy Sedykh (URS)	86.74 m	Stuttgart, West Germany	30 August 1986
Championship record	Ivan Tsikhan (BLR)	83.63 m	Osaka, Japan	27 August 2007
World Leading	Wojciech Nowicki (POL)	81.58 m	Chorzów, Poland	5 June 2022
African Record	Mostafa Elgamel (EGY)	81.27 m	Cairo, Egypt	21 March 2014
Asian Record	Koji Murofushi (JPN)	84.86 m	Prague, Czech Republic	29 June 2003
North, Central American and Caribbean record	Lance Deal (USA)	82.52 m	Milan, Italy	7 September 1996
South American Record	Wagner Domingos (BRA)	78.63 m	Celje, Slovenia	19 June 2016
European Record	Yuriy Sedykh (URS)	86.74 m	Stuttgart, West Germany	30 August 1986
Oceanian record	Stuart Rendell (AUS)	79.29 m	Varaždin, Croatia	6 July 2002

The following records were established during the competition:

Date	Event	Name	Nationality	Distance	Record
17 July	Final	Paweł Fajdek	POL	81.98	WL

== Qualification standard ==
The standard to qualify automatically for entry was 77.50 m.

== Schedule ==
The event schedule, in local time (UTC−7), was as follows:

Date	Time	Round
15 July	09:05	Qualification
16 July	12:00	Final

== Results ==
=== Qualification ===
Qualification: Qualifying Performance 77.50 (Q) or at least 12 best performers (q) advanced to the final.

Rank	Group	Name	Nationality	Round			Mark	Notes
Rank	Group	Name	Nationality	1	2	3	Mark	Notes
1	B	Paweł Fajdek	Poland	74.63	80.09		80.09	Q
2	A	Daniel Haugh	United States	74.56	77.13	79.34	79.34	Q
3	A	Wojciech Nowicki	Poland	79.22			79.22	Q
4	B	Bence Halász	Hungary	79.13			79.13	Q
5	B	Rudy Winkler	United States	76.97	78.61		78.61	Q
6	A	Eivind Henriksen	Norway	78.12			78.12	Q
7	B	Quentin Bigot	France	75.62	77.95		77.95	Q
8	B	Mykhaylo Kokhan	Ukraine	76.62	74.95	77.58	77.58	Q
9	A	Nick Miller	Great Britain & N.I.	77.13	x	x	77.13	q, SB
10	A	Christos Frantzeskakis	Greece	76.03	74.47	75.79	76.03	q
11	B	Humberto Mansilla	Chile	72.85	74.39	75.33	75.33	q
12	B	Alex Young	United States	74.67	x	72.97	74.67	q
13	A	Adam Keenan	Canada	74.38	74.44	72.24	74.44	
14	B	Javier Cienfuegos	Spain	73.16	72.43	74.25	74.25	
15	B	Serghei Marghiev	Moldova	70.13	73.46	74.17	74.17	
16	A	Diego del Real	Mexico	73.96	74.12	73.23	74.12	
17	B	Rowan Hamilton	Canada	73.58	74.02	72.26	74.02	
18	A	Yann Chaussinand	France	72.62	73.95	x	73.95	
19	A	Marcin Wrotyński	Poland	73.00	73.55	73.26	73.55	
20	B	Ragnar Carlsson	Sweden	x	72.26	73.45	73.45	
21	B	Thomas Mardal	Norway	70.31	x	72.90	72.90	
22	A	Tristan Schwandke	Germany	71.94	72.87	71.02	72.87	
23	A	Tuomas Seppänen	Finland	72.63	72.29	72.81	72.81	
24	A	Hilmar Örn Jónsson	Iceland	72.36	72.72	x	72.72	
25	B	Michail Anastasakis	Greece	70.35	70.03	72.40	72.40	
26	B	Allan Wolski	Brazil	x	69.56	71.27	71.27	
27	B	Aaron Kangas	Finland	69.69	69.64	68.35	69.69	
28	A	Joaquín Gómez	Argentina	69.03	68.41	x	69.03	
	A	Denzel Comenentia	Netherlands	x	x	x	NM	
	A	Gabriel Kehr	Chile					DNS

=== Final ===
Rank	Name	Nationality	Round						Mark	Notes
Rank	Name	Nationality	1	2	3	4	5	6	Mark	Notes
1st place, gold medalist(s)	Paweł Fajdek	Poland	74.71	80.58	81.98	79.13	x	x	81.98	WL
2nd place, silver medalist(s)	Wojciech Nowicki	Poland	77.40	80.07	81.03	x	79.45	79.53	81.03	
3rd place, bronze medalist(s)	Eivind Henriksen	Norway	78.89	80.87	x	75.55	77.74	78.19	80.87	SB
4	Quentin Bigot	France	79.52	78.86	80.24	79.94	79.85	79.38	80.24	
5	Bence Halász	Hungary	79.12	79.46	80.15	x	78.77	79.07	80.15	PB
6	Rudy Winkler	United States	78.91	77.49	x	78.51	78.99	78.89	78.99	
7	Mykhaylo Kokhan	Ukraine	78.07	78.83	x	77.94	78.16	77.97	78.83	SB
8	Daniel Haugh	United States	76.80	78.10	x	76.52	77.71	x	78.10	
9	Christos Frantzeskakis	Greece	77.04	74.34	76.85				77.04	
10	Humberto Mansilla	Chile	73.91	71.71	73.05				73.91	
11	Nick Miller	Great Britain & N.I.	x	x	73.74				73.74	
12	Alex Young	United States	73.60	73.53	x				73.60	
