= Sören Klose =

German athlete

Personal information
- Nationality: German
- Born: 14 June 2002 (age 24)

Sport
- Sport: Athletics
- Event: Hammer throw

Achievements and titles
- Personal best: Hammer: 77.49m (2024)
Medal record
Men's athletics
Representing Germany
European U23 Championships
Bronze medal – third place	2023 Espoo	Hammer throw

Sören Klose (born 14 June 2002) is a German hammer thrower. He won the German Athletics Championships in 2023 and 2024. He competed at the 2023 World Athletics Championships and the 2024 Olympic Games.

== Biography ==
He is a member of Eintracht Frankfurt athletics club. He is coached by Helge Zöllkau. He was a bronze medalist at the 2023 European Athletics U23 Championships in Espoo, Finland in the hammer throw, finishing behind compatriot Merlin Hummel, who won the silver medal, and Ukrainian Mykhaylo Kokhan.

He became senior national champion at the German Athletics Championships for the first time in July 2023. He competed at the 2023 World Athletics Championships in Budapest in the hammer throw where he threw 72.23 metres but did not proceed to the final.

He set a new personal best of 77.49 metres, achieving a throw over 77 metres for the first time, at the International Sparkasse Hammer Throw Meeting in Fränkisch-Crumbach in May 2024. He competed in the 2024 European Championships in Rome in the hammer throw, throwing 72.96 metres without reaching the final. He retained his German national title in June 2024. He competed in the hammer throw at the 2024 Paris Olympics where he threw 71.20 metres but did not progress through to the final.

In August 2026, he was a finalist competing at the 2026 European Athletics Championships in Birmingham, England, placing sixth overall in the hammer throw.

== Personal life ==
He is from near Porta Westfalica in the district of Minden-Lübbecke, in North Rhine-Westphalia, Germany. He is from a family of hammer throwers. His father Holger Klose took part in World and European championships in the 1990s and 2000s and his mother Kirsten Münchow won bronze at the 2000 Olympic Games in Sydney. He is good friends with fellow German athlete and hammer thrower Merlin Hummel.
