= Denzel Comenentia =

Dutch athletics competitor

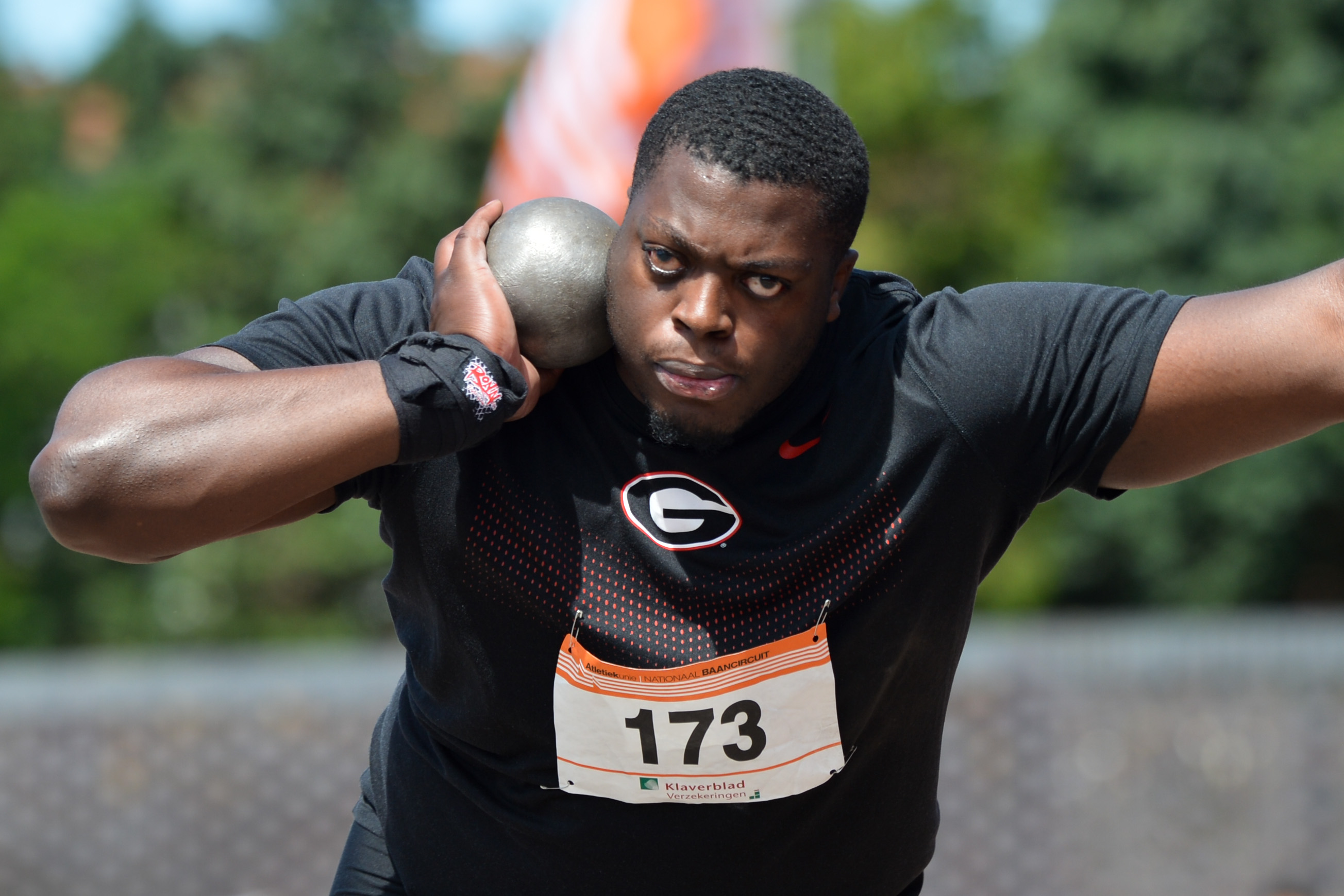
- Denzel Comenentia in 2017

Personal information
- Born: 25 November 1995 (age 30) Amsterdam, Netherlands
- Education: University of Georgia
- Height: 1.86 m (6 ft 1 in)
- Weight: 109 kg (240 lb)

Sport
- Sport: Athletics
- Events: Hammer throw, shot put
- College team: Georgia Bulldogs

Denzel Comenentia (born 25 November 1995) is a Dutch athlete specialising in the hammer throw and shot put. He won silver medals in the latter at the 2014 World Junior Championships and 2017 European U23 Championships.

His personal best in the hammer is 79.09 metres set in Los Angeles in 2024. This is the current national record. His personal best in the shot put is 20.88 metres set in Knoxville in 2018.

Comenentia is blind in his right eye following an accident in a gym in 2015.

== International competitions ==
Year	Competition	Venue	Position	Event	Notes
Representing the Netherlands
2013	European Junior Championships	Rieti, Italy	16th (q)	Discus throw (6 kg)	53.22 m
2013	European Junior Championships	Rieti, Italy	–	Hammer throw (6 kg)	NM
2014	World Junior Championships	Eugene, United States	2nd	Shot put (6 kg)	20.17 m
2014	World Junior Championships	Eugene, United States	11th	Hammer throw (6 kg)	68.65 m
2015	European U23 Championships	Tallinn, Estonia	23rd (q)	Shot put	17.04 m
2017	European U23 Championships	Bydgoszcz, Poland	2nd	Shot put	19.86 m
2018	European Championships	Berlin, Germany	22nd (q)	Hammer throw	70.70 m
2019	World Championships	Doha, Qatar	23rd (q)	Shot put	20.03 m
2022	World Championships	Eugene, United States	–	Hammer throw	NM
2022	European Championships	Munich, Germany	23rd (q)	Hammer throw	68.89 m
2023	World Championships	Budapest, Hungary	29th (q)	Hammer throw	70.16 m
2024	European Championships	Rome, Italy	16th (q)	Hammer throw	73.45 m
2024	Olympic Games	Paris, France	14th (q)	Hammer throw	74.31 m
2025	World Championships	Tokyo, Japan	12th	Hammer throw	74.86 m
2026	European Championships	Birmingham, United Kingdom	20th (q)	Hammer throw	72.00 m
