= Mihail Anastasakis =

Greek hammer thrower (born 1994)

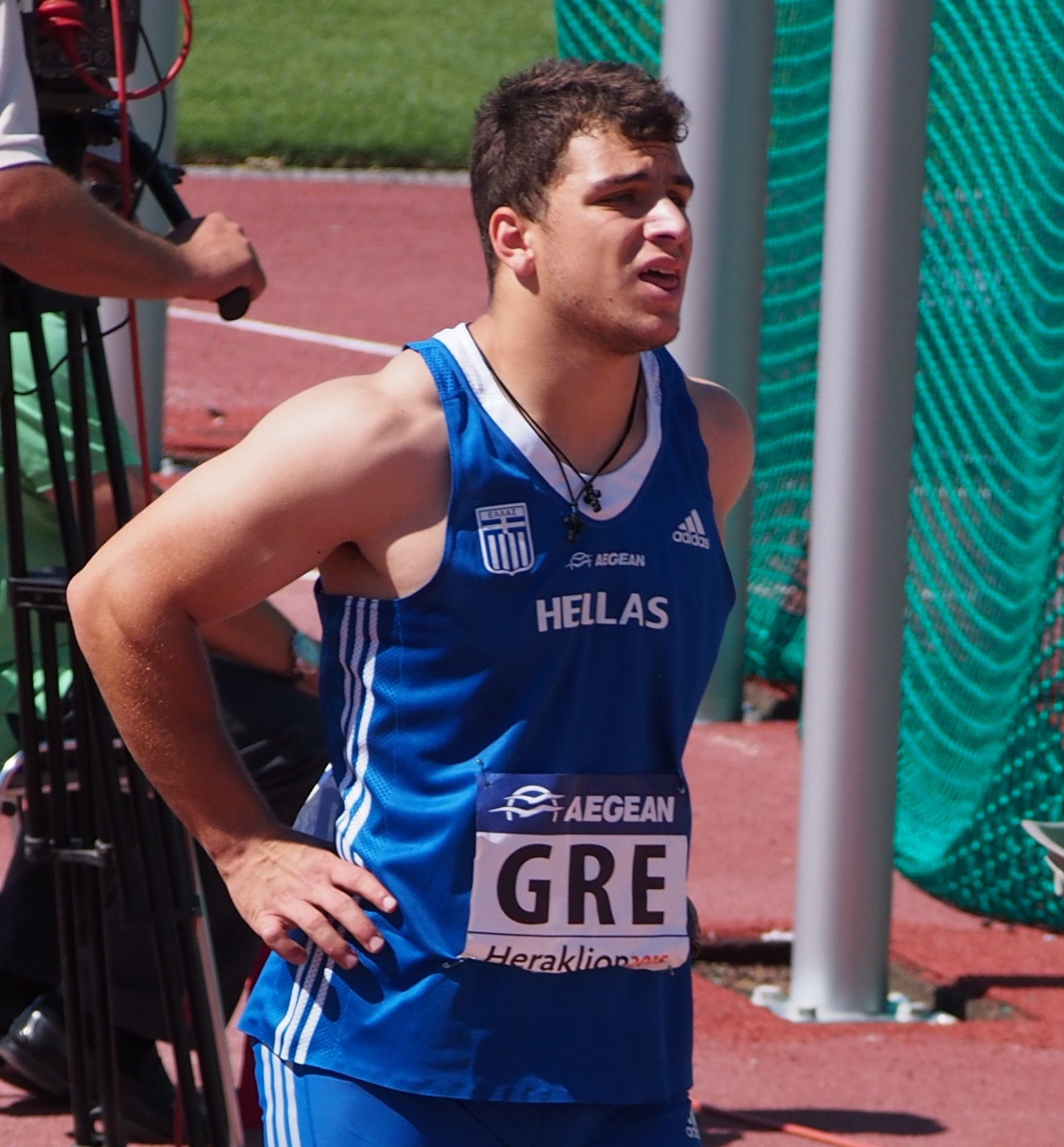
- Mihail Anastasakis in 2015

Personal information
- Nationality: Greek
- Born: 3 December 1994 (age 31)
- Height: 1.83 m (6 ft 0 in)
- Weight: 92 kg (203 lb)

Sport
- Sport: Athletics
- Event: Hammer throw

Achievements and titles
- Personal best: 77.72 m (2017)

Mihaíl Anastasákis (Greek: Μιχάλης Αναστασάκης; born 3 December 1994) is a Greek track and field athlete specialising in the hammer throw. He finished fourth at the 2016 European Championships.

His personal best in the event is 77.72 metres set in Nikiti in 2017.

== International competitions ==
Year	Competition	Venue	Position	Event	Notes
Representing Greece
2011	World Youth Championships	Lille, France	8th	Hammer throw (5 kg)	69.64 m
2011	European Youth Olympic Festival	Trabzon, Turkey	8th	Hammer throw (5 kg)	69.26 m
2013	European Junior Championships	Rieti, Italy	6th	Hammer throw (6 kg)	72.44 m
2015	European U23 Championships	Tallinn, Estonia	4th	Hammer throw	71.64 m
2016	European Championships	Amsterdam, Netherlands	4th	Hammer throw	75.89 m
2016	Olympic Games	Rio de Janeiro, Brazil	20th (q)	Hammer throw	71.28 m
2017	World Championships	London, United Kingdom	28th (q)	Hammer throw	70.94 m
2018	European Championships	Berlin, Germany	9th	Hammer throw	73.33 m
2019	World Championships	Doha, Qatar	13th (q)	Hammer throw	75.07 m
2021	Olympic Games	Tokyo, Japan	22nd (q)	Hammer throw	73.52 m
2022	World Championships	Eugene, United States	25th (q)	Hammer throw	72.40 m
2022	European Championships	Munich, Germany	19th (q)	Hammer throw	70.84 m
2023	World Championships	Budapest, Hungary	10th	Hammer throw	75.49 m
2024	European Championships	Rome, Italy	14th (q)	Hammer throw	73.60 m
2024	Olympic Games	Paris, France	29th (q)	Hammer throw	70.14 m
2026	European Championships	Birmingham, United Kingdom	18th (q)	Hammer throw	72.57 m
