= Rudy Winkler =

American hammer thrower (born 1994)

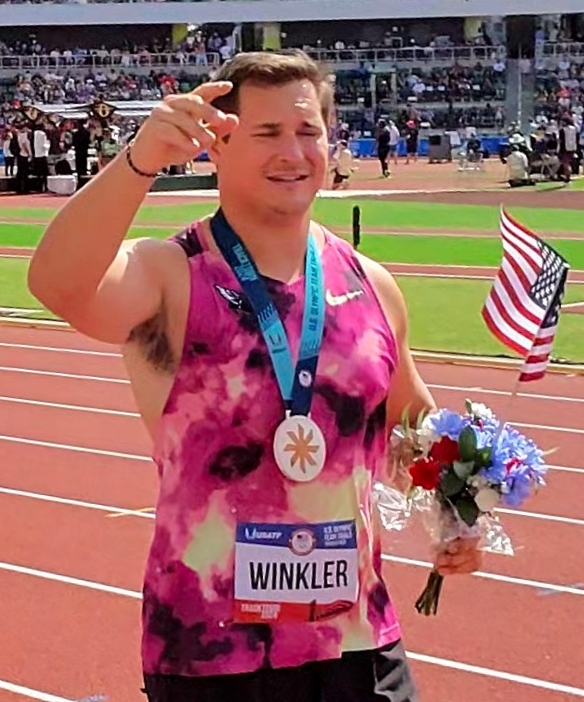
- Winkler in 2024

Personal information
- Born: December 6, 1994 (age 31) Albany, New York, U.S.
- Height: 6 ft 2 in (188 cm)
- Weight: 240 lb (109 kg)

Sport
- Sport: Track and field
- Event: Hammer throw
- College team: Cornell Big Red

Achievements and titles
- Personal best: Hammer: 82.71 m (271 ft 4 in)
Medal record
Men's athletics
Representing United States
NACAC Championships
Silver medal – second place	2025 Freeport	Discus throw
Pan American Games
Bronze medal – third place	2023 Santiago	Hammer throw
- Updated on July 8, 2021

Rudy Winkler (born December 6, 1994) is an American male track and field athlete who competes in the hammer throw. He is the NACAC area record holder and American record holder with a throw of 82.71 m (271 ft 4 in) for the hammer and holds a personal best of 23.32 m (76 ft 6 in) for the weight throw. He was the hammer national champion in 2016 and 2020, winning the 2016. and 2020 United States Olympic Trials.

== Career ==
Born in Sand Lake, New York, Winkler attended Averill Park High School and competed in the hammer from a young age and represented the United States in age category competitions. He was a finalist at both the 2011 World Youth and the 2012 World Junior Championships in Athletics. He won his first international medal at the Pan American Junior Championships in 2013, taking the silver medal behind Mexico's Diego del Real.

He joined Cornell University and competed collegiately for their Cornell Big Red track team and was selected for the Quill and Dagger society. He topped the field of the weight throw at the 2015 Ivy League Indoor Track & Field Championships, then won the hammer title at the conference's outdoor championships later that year. At his first national event, he came eighth in the hammer at the 2015 NCAA Division I Outdoor Track and Field Championships. In the 2016 season, he defended his Ivy League Indoor title and placed tenth at the NCAA Men's Division I Indoor Track and Field Championships. He was again hammer champion at the Ivy League Outdoor meet and set a personal record of 72.84 m (238 ft 11 1/2 in) to place runner-up to Britain's Nick Miller at the 2016 NCAA Outdoor Championships. Following his graduation in 2017, Winkler used the last of his NCAA eligibility for the Rutgers Scarlet Knights track and field team, setting their school record and placing 4th at the 2018 NCAA Division I Outdoor Track and Field Championships.

At the 2016 United States Olympic Trials a big personal best of 76.76 m (251 ft 10 in) brought him his first national title and selection for the USA Olympic team. Although he was just short of the 77-meter qualifying standard set by the IAAF, he was invited to compete as one of the highest-ranked athletes, as an insufficient number of people had achieved the mark that year.

He currently resides in Washington, D.C., with his fiancé, Olivia Foster.

He has cited his friends, Paddy McGrath and Roman Feldman, as influences on his athletic career.

== International competitions ==
Year	Competition	Venue	Position	Event	Notes
2011	World Youth Championships	Villeneuve-d'Ascq, France	9th	Hammer throw	68.14 m
2012	World Junior Championships	Barcelona, Spain	11th	Hammer throw	69.35 m
2013	Pan American Junior Championships	Medellín, Colombia	2nd	Hammer throw	71.79 m
2016	NACAC U23 Championships	San Salvador, El Salvador	2nd	Hammer throw	73.00 m
2016	Olympic Games	Rio de Janeiro, Brazil	18th (q)	Hammer throw	71.89 m
2017	World Championships	London, United Kingdom	31st (q)	Hammer throw	68.88 m
2018	NACAC Championships	Toronto, Canada	4th	Hammer throw	70.45 m
2019	Pan American Games	Lima, Peru	8th	Hammer throw	71.84 m
2019	World Championships	Doha, Qatar	11th	Hammer throw	75.20 m
2021	Olympic Games	Tokyo, Japan	7th	Hammer throw	77.08 m
2022	World Championships	Eugene, United States	6th	Hammer throw	78.99 m
2022	NACAC Championships	Freeport, Bahamas	1st	Hammer throw	78.29 m
2023	World Championships	Budapest, Hungary	8th	Hammer throw	76.04 m
2023	Pan American Games	Santiago, Chile	3rd	Hammer throw	76.65 m
2024	Olympic Games	Paris, France	6th	Hammer throw	77.92 m
2025	NACAC Championships	Freeport, Bahamas	2nd	Hammer throw	76.87 m
2025	World Championships	Tokyo, Japan	5th	Hammer throw	78.52 m
2026	World Ultimate Championship	Budapest, Hungary	7th	Hammer throw	75.86 m

== National titles ==
- USA Outdoor Track and Field Championships
  - Hammer throw: 2016
  - Hammer throw: 2020

== Personal records ==
- Hammer throw – 82.71 m (271 ft 4 1/4 in) (2021)
- Discus throw – 51.47 m (168 ft 10 1/4 in) (2019)
- Weight throw – 23.32 m (76 ft 6 in) (2017)

Awards
Preceded by Tyreek Hill	Track & Field News High School Boys Athlete of the Year; 2013	Succeeded by Trentavis Friday
