= Patrik Hájek =

Czech athlete

Patrick Hájek
Personal information
- Nationality: Czech
- Born: 11 November 1998 (age 27) Jablonec nad Nisou, Czech Republic

Sport
- Sport: Athletics
- Event: Hammer throw

Achievements and titles
- Personal bests: Hammer: 76.49 m (Kolín, 2024)

Patrik Hájek (born 11 November 1998) is a Czech hammer thrower. He is a multiple-time national champion and won the Czech Athletics Championships for consecutive years between 2020 and 2023. He has competed for the Czech Republic at multiple major championships, including the 2024 Olympic Games.

== Life ==
Hájek was born on 11 November 1998 in Jablonec nad Nisou.

== Career ==
From Jablonec, he is a member of Dukla Prague. He competed at the 2016 IAAF World U20 Championships in Bydgoszcz, Poland.

He increases his personal best distance for the hammer throw to 72.02 metres whilst competing in Kolín in June 2020. He won his first Czech national title at the Czech Athletics Championships in August 2020, in Plzeň. He would go on to win four consecutive national titles, winning his fourth in July 2023 in Tábor.

He competed at the 2023 World Athletics Championships in Budapest in the hammer throw, where he threw 68.77 metres without progressing through to the final.

He started his 2024 season with a throw of 74.63 metres competing in April 2024, in Kolín. Later that month at the same venue, he threw a new personal best distance of 76.49 metres.

He competed in the 2024 European Championships in Rome, Italy, in the hammer throw, where he threw 72.72 metres but did not proceed to the final. He finished runner-up to Volodymyr Myslyvčuk at the 2024 Czech Athletics Championships later that month, throwing a distance of 73.84 metres in Zlín. He competed in the hammer throw at the 2024 Olympic Games in Paris, France, but threw 68.80 metres and did not qualify for the final.

In September 2025, he competed in the hammer throw at the 2025 World Championships in Tokyo, Japan.

In August 2026, he competed at the 2026 European Athletics Championships in Birmingham, England, in the hammer throw.
