= Jake Norris =

British athlete

Personal information
- Nationality: British (English)
- Born: 30 June 1999 (age 27) Ascot, England

Sport
- Sport: Athletics
- Event: hammer throw
- University team: LSU Tigers
- Club: Windsor, Slough, Eton & Hounslow

Achievements and titles
- Personal best: Hammer: 77.76m (2026)
Medal record
Men's athletics
Representing Great Britain
World U20 Championships
Gold medal – first place	2018 Tampere	Hammer
European Youth Championships
Silver medal – second place	2016 Tbilisi	Hammer

Jake Norris (born 30 June 1999) is a British athlete, specialising in the hammer throw. He was the 2018 World U-20 (junior) champion and is a multiple-time British champion.

== Biography ==
Norris played a number of sports including as a hooker in rugby union prior to focusing on athletics. He was coached by Paul Dickenson for 12 years, until his death in November 2024. A member of Windsor, Slough Eton & Hounslow Athletics Club, Norris attended Louisiana State University in the United States. In July 2016, he was a silver medalist at the 2016 European Athletics U18 Championships in Tbilisi.

In June 2018, Norris competed at the England Athletics U23 and U20 Championships in Bedford and won with a British under-20 hammer record of 80.45m. He broke the British U20 record again with 80.65m throw in the 6 kg hammer, and won the gold medal at the 2018 IAAF World Junior Championship in Tampere.

Although he threw 73.24 metres with the senior weight implement as a 17-year-old, as he moved into his early 20s he suffered from a series of minor injuries that interrupted his training and stunted his progress. He returned to Britain in 2022 and was trained by Paul Dickenson. After a accession of throws of 70 metres in 2023, he became the British hammer throw champion after winning the title at the 2023 British Athletics Championships in Manchester, in July, with a distance of 74.75 metres. He then set a new personal best of 76.30 metres in October 2023.

In May 2024, he threw a personal best 77.37 metres in Kladno. He was also selected to represent Britain in the hammer at the 2024 European Athletics Championships in Rome, Italy, placing tenth overall with a throw of 73.66 metres He qualified for the 2024 Olympic Games by ranking but was one of a number of athletes controversially not selected by British Athletics.

In March 2025, he competed for Great Britain at the European Throwing Cup, in Nicosia, Cyprus, and placed seventh overall with a throw of 75.61 metres. He was selected for the 2025 European Athletics Team Championships in Madrid in June 2025. In August he won his third consecutive British outdoor title at the 2025 UK Athletics Championships, and represented Great Britain the following month at the 2025 World Athletics Championships.

In May 2026, he set a new personal best of 77.76 metres while competing in Germany, to win the Halplus Werfertage Throws Meet ahead of Merlin Hummel. In June, Norris retained the British national hammer throw title at the 2026 UK Athletics Championships with 76.30 metres. He was selected to represent England at the 2026 Commonwealth Games in Glasgow, placing fourth overall with 71.66 metres. Competing for Great Britain at the 2026 European Championships in Birmingham, he qualified for the final on 10 August, and finished eleventh overall the following day with a best of 74.61 metres. In October 2026, he moved up to podium potential in the 2026-27 Olympic World Class Programme awarded by UK Athletics.
