= Hlib Piskunov =

Ukrainian hammer thrower (born 1998)

Personal information
- Born: 25 November 1998 (age 27)

Sport
- Country: Ukraine
- Sport: Athletics
- Event: Hammer throw

Achievements and titles
- Personal best: Hammer throw: 77.72 m (2021)
Medal record
Men's athletics
Representing Ukraine
Youth Olympic Games
Gold medal – first place	2014 Nanjing	Hammer throw
World Youth Championships
Gold medal – first place	2015 Cali	Hammer throw
World U20 Championships
Silver medal – second place	2016 Bydgoszcz	Hammer throw
European U20 Championships
Gold medal – first place	2017 Grosseto	Hammer throw
European Youth Olympic Festival
Gold medal – first place	2013 Utrecht	Hammer throw

Hlib Piskunov (born 25 November 1998) is a Ukrainian male hammer thrower, who won an individual gold medal at the Youth World Championships.
