= Volodymyr Myslyvčuk =

Czech athlete

Personal information
- Nationality: Czech
- Born: 25 April 1996 (age 30) Deliatyn, Ukraine

Sport
- Sport: Athletics
- Event: Hammer throw

Achievements and titles
- Personal bests: Hammer: 80.69 m (Nicosia, 2026)
Medal record
Men's athletics
Representing Czech Republic
European Throwing Cup
Gold medal – first place	2026 Nicosia	Hammer Throw
Silver medal – second place	2025 Nicosia	Hammer Throw

Volodymyr Myslyvčuk (Ukrainian: Володимир Мисливчук; born 25 April 1996) is a Ukrainian-Czech hammer thrower. Born in Ukraine, he gained Czech citizenship in 2024. He became Czech national champion at the 2024 Czech Athletics Championships and competed for the Czech Republic at the 2024 Olympic Games.

== Life ==
Myslyvčuk was born on 25 April 1996 in Deliatyn, Ukraine, he gained Czech citizenship in May 2024. After he moved to the Czech Republic he worked as a labourer. He had a period of time without competing but was gifted a new hammer by his wife which kick-started his athletics career.

== Career ==
He won the bronze medal competing for Ukraine in the hammer throw in the U23 category at the European Throwing Cup in Las Palmas in 2017, and a year later in Leiria, Portugal, he won the silver medal in that age-group category at the event.

He improved his personal best to 76.52 metres competing in April 2024 in Kolín. He competed in the 2024 European Championships in Rome, Italy in the hammer throw, achieving a distance of 73.43 metres without qualifying for the final, in June 2024. He became Czech national champion for the first time in June 2024 the Czech Athletics Championships later that month, throwing a distance of 75.84 metres in Zlín. He competed in the hammer throw at the 2024 Olympic Games in Paris, France where he threw 73.84 metres without reaching the final.

He won the silver medal at the 2025 European Throwing Cup in Nicosia, Cyprus in March 2025, with a personal best throw of 77.98 metres. In September 2025, he competed in the hammer throw at the 2025 World Championships in Tokyo, Japan.

In March 2026, he won the hammer throw at the 2026 European Throwing Cup in Nicolas, Cyprus, with a personal best throw of 80.69 metres to beat defending champion Bence Halasz. It was the first throw over 80 metres at the competition since 2009. In April, he placed third with a throw of 77.71m at the 2026 Kip Keino Classic. On 11 August, Myslyvcuk made a throw of 79.42 metres in the hammer throw final at the 2026 European Athletics Championships in Birmingham and held second spot for much of the competition behind Halász, before ultimately being usurped from the medal positions by Merlin Hummel of Germany and Ukrainian Mykhaylo Kokhan, finishing fourth.
