= Angelos Mantzouranis =

Greek athlete (born 2004)

Personal information
- Nationality: Greek
- Born: 1 May 2004 (age 22)

Sport
- Sport: Athletics
- Event: Hammer

Achievements and titles
- Personal best(s): Hammer: 78.61m (Minneapolis, 2025)

Angelos Mantzouranis (born 1 May 2004) is a Greek track and field athlete who competes in the hammer throw.

== Biography ==
Competing for the University of Minnesota he won the NCAA Division 1 West Regional hammer throw competition in Fayetteville, Arkansas with a best throw of 72.57 metres. He finished third as a freshman in the hammer throw at the 2024 NCAA Division I Outdoor Track and Field Championships in Eugene, Oregon.

He increased his personal best to 78.61 metres in May 2025 at Hamline's 'Meet of the UnSaintly', a distance that was a programme record for Minnesota, and placed him third on the all-time NCAA list, being the furthest college throw since Andras Haklits in 2002. The throw also met the qualifying standard for the 2025 World Athletics Championships. He threw 76.96 metres to place runner-up at the 2025 NCAA Championships in June 2025, behind compatriot and Minnesota teammate Kostas Zaltos. It was the first time teammates had finished first and second in the hammer throw at the NCAA championships since 2011. The following month, he was selected to represent Greece at the 2025 European Athletics U23 Championships in Bergen, Norway. In September 2025, he competed in the hammer throw at the 2025 World Championships in Tokyo, Japan.

In May 2026, he threw 75.98 m to win the hammer throw at the Big Ten Championships. The following month he won the 2026 NCAA Championships with a throw of 75.78 metres.

== Personal life ==
He is from Athens.
