= Konstantinos Zaltos =

Greek athlete (born 2000)

Kostas Zaltos
Personal information
- Nationality: Greek
- Born: Konstantinos Zaltos; 5 February 2000 (age 26)

Sport
- Sport: Athletics
- Event: Hammer

Achievements and titles
- Personal bests: Hammer: 78.08m (Eugene, 2025)

Konstantinos “Kostas” Zaltos (Greek: Κωνσταντίνος Ζάλτος; born 5 February 2000) is a Greek track and field athlete who competes in the hammer throw. He competed at the 2023 World Athletics Championships and won the 2025 NCAA Division I Outdoor Track and Field Championships.

== Early life ==
Zaltos was raised in Pedino, Kilkis, Greece. A keen basketball player, he was introduced to the hammer throw as a 14-year-old. He moved to the United States to study and compete at the University of Minnesota following a conversation with Minnesota throwing coach Peter Miller in Sweden at the 2019 European Athletics U20 Championships.

== Career ==
Representing the University of Minnesota, he finished in third place at both the 2021 and 2022 NCAA Championships. His 2021 distance was 71.21 metres, and in 2022 he set a personal best distance of 72.51 metres.

Zaltos won the Big Ten hammer competition for the third consecutive year in May 2023. He was the runner-up at the 2023 NCAA Championships in Austin, Texas in June 2023, with a personal best 76.33 metres, to finish runner-up to Britain's Kenneth Ikeji. He was selected for the 2023 World Athletics Championships in Budapest in August 2023 but did not qualify for the final.

In June 2024, he competed at the 2024 European Athletics Championships in Rome, Italy, throwing 74.49 metres to qualify for the final, in which he placed twelfth overall. Later that month, he finished third at the Greek Athletics Championships with a throw of 74.06 metres.

In March 2025, he threw 76.85m in Tampa to move to 13th on the all-time NCAA list. He threw 78.08 metres to win the 2025 NCAA Championships title in June 2025, ahead of Minnesota teammate and compatriot Angelos Mantzouranis. In September 2025, he competed in the hammer throw at the 2025 World Championships in Tokyo, Japan.

== International competitions ==
Year	Competition	Venue	Position	Notes
Representing Greece
2024	European Championships	Rome, Italy	final	9/6
