= Hilmar Örn Jónsson =

Icelandic hammer thrower

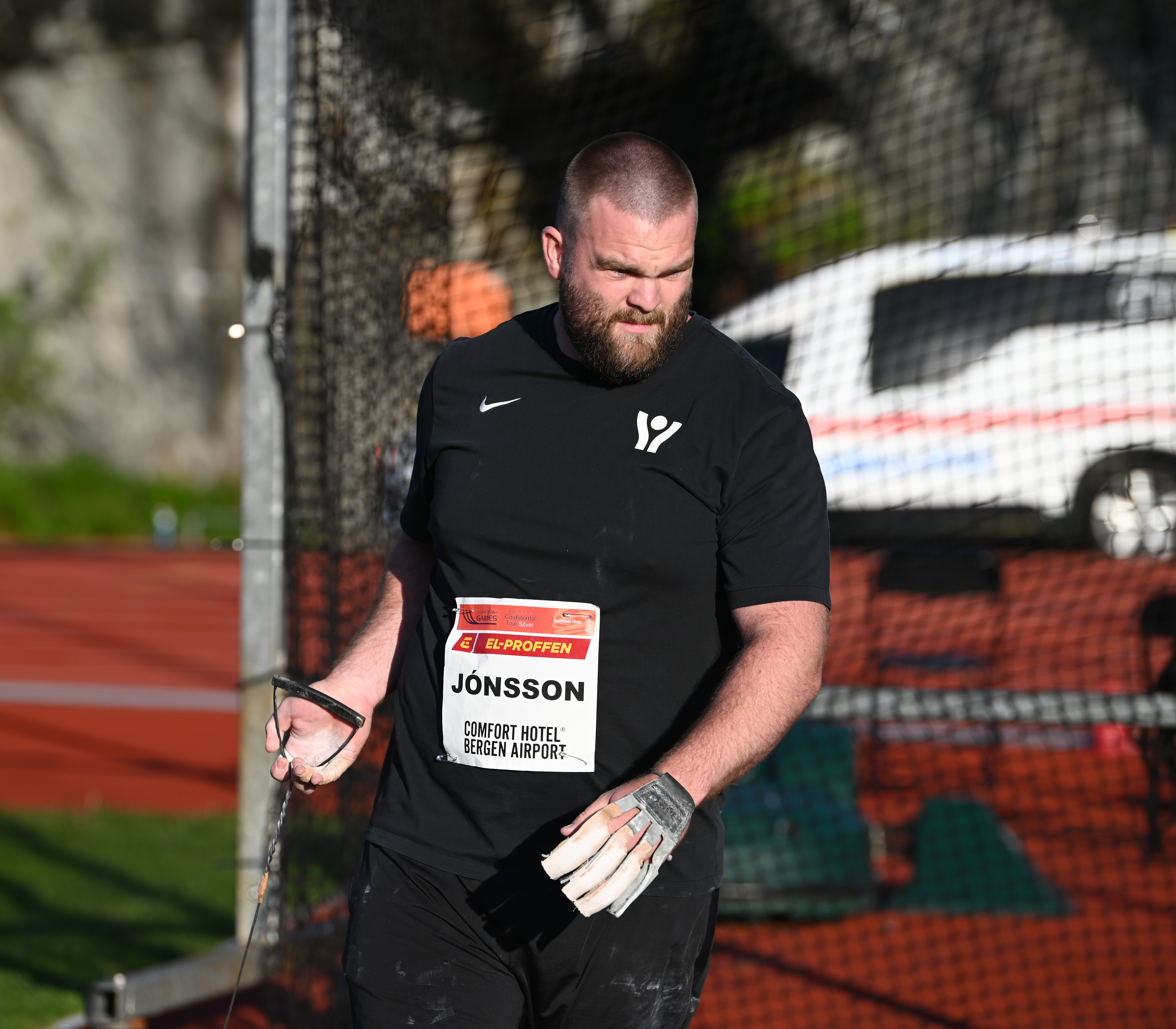
- Hilmar Jonsson in 2026

Personal information
- Born: 6 May 1996 (age 30) Reykjavík, Iceland
- Education: University of Virginia
- Height: 1.81 m (5 ft 11 in)
- Weight: 100 kg (220 lb)

Sport
- Sport: Athletics
- Event: Hammer throw
- College team: Virginia Cavaliers

Hilmar Örn Jónsson (born 6 May 1996) is an Icelandic athlete specialising in the hammer throw. He represented his country at the 2017 World Championships without reaching the final.

His personal best in the event is 78.03 m set in Nicosia, Cyprus in March 2026 at the 2026 European Throwing Cup.

Both of his parents used to be athletes; his father Jón Sigurjónsson was a hammer thrower while his mother Guðbjörg Lilja Svansdóttir was a high jumper.

== International competitions ==
Year	Competition	Venue	Position	Event	Notes
Representing Iceland
2013	World Youth Championships	Donetsk, Ukraine	25th (q)	Shot put (5 kg)	17.86 m
2013	World Youth Championships	Donetsk, Ukraine	17th (q)	Hammer throw (5 kg)	70.98 m
2013	European Junior Championships	Rieti, Italy	7th	Hammer throw (6 kg)	71.85 m
2014	World Junior Championships	Eugene, United States	3rd (q)	Hammer throw (6 kg)	76.03 m^{1}
2015	Games of the Small States of Europe	Reykjavík, Iceland	5th	Discus throw	43.96 m
2015	European Junior Championships	Eskilstuna, Sweden	–	Hammer throw (6 kg)	NM
2017	European U23 Championships	Bydgoszcz, Poland	7th	Hammer throw	69.96 m
2017	World Championships	London, United Kingdom	27th (q)	Hammer throw	71.12 m
2022	Championships of the Small States of Europe	Marsa, Malta	2nd	Hammer throw	70.95 m
2022	World Championships	Eugene, United States	24th (q)	Hammer throw	72.72 m
2022	European Championships	Munich, Germany	12th	Hammer throw	70.03 m
2023	World Championships	Budapest, Hungary	–	Hammer throw	NM
2024	European Championships	Rome, Italy	24th (q)	Hammer throw	72.05 m
2026	European Championships	Birmingham, United Kingdom	7th	Hammer throw	77.26 m

^{1}No mark in the final
