= Merlin Hummel =

German athlete (born 2002)

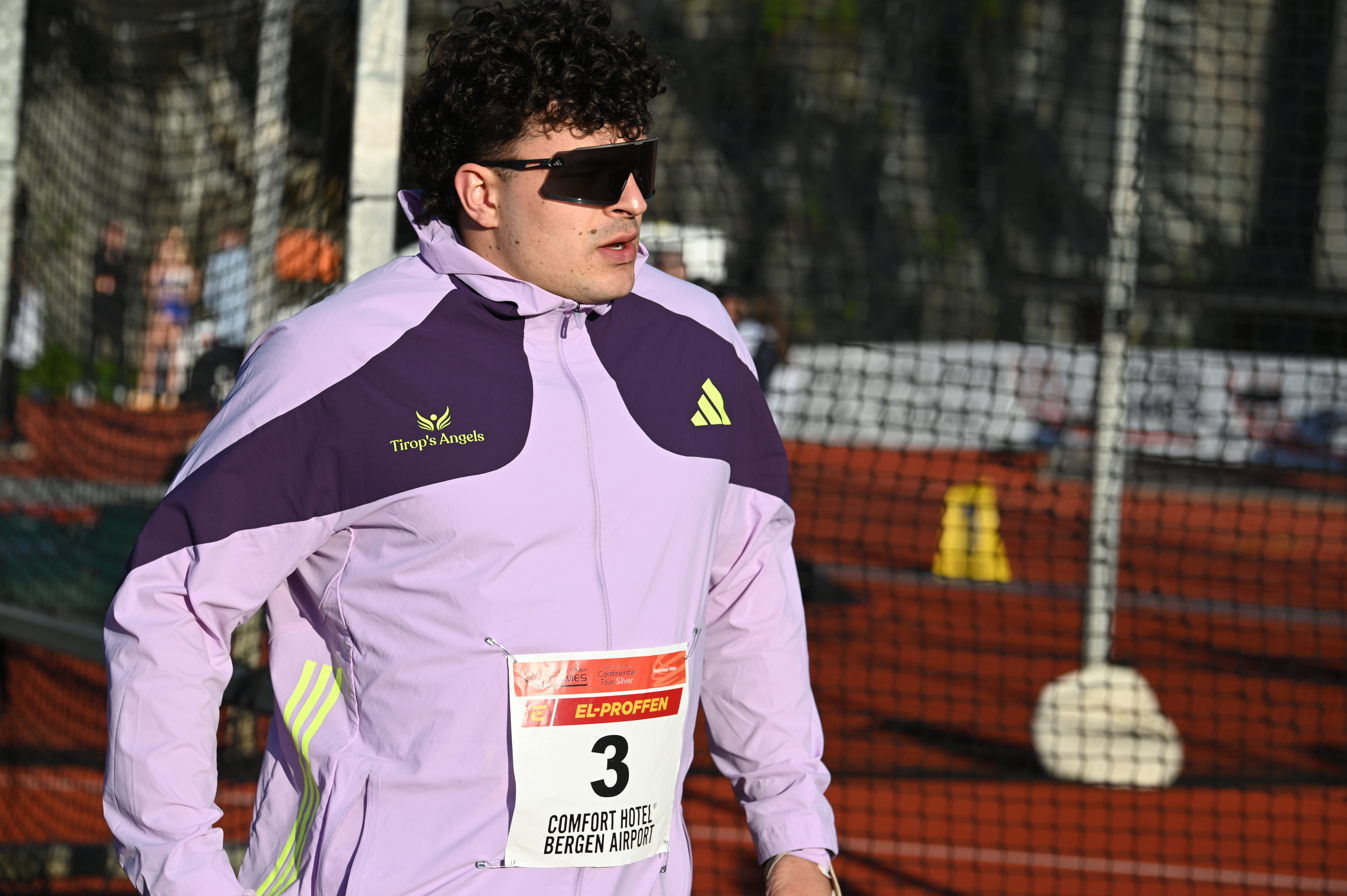
- Merlin Hummel in 2026

Personal information
- Nationality: German
- Born: 4 January 2002 (age 24)

Sport
- Sport: Athletics
- Event: Hammer throw

Achievements and titles
- Personal bests: Hammer: 82.77 m (Tokyo, 2025)
Medal record
Men's athletics
Representing Germany
World Championships
| Silver medal – second place | 2025 Tokyo | Hammer throw |
World Ultimate Championship
| First place | 2026 Budapest | Hammer throw |
European Championships
| Silver medal – second place | 2026 Birmingham | Hammer throw |
European U23 Championships
| Silver medal – second place | 2023 Espoo | Hammer throw |
Summer World University Games
| Silver medal – second place | 2025 Bochum | Hammer throw |
European U20 Championships
| Silver medal – second place | 2021 Tallinn | Hammer throw |

Merlin Hummel (born 4 January 2002) is a German hammer thrower. He won the inaugural World Ultimate Championship in 2026 having previously won the German Championships in 2022, 2025 and 2026. He was a silver medalist at the 2025 World Championships, and represented Germany at the 2024 Olympic Games. He also won silver medals at the European U20 and U23 Championships, and the 2025 World University Games.

== Biography ==
Hummel is a member of ULC Kulmbach. He was a 2021 European Athletics U20 Championships silver medallist in Tallinn, Estonia, in 2021. He finished runner-up at the U23 European Throwing Cup in 2022. He won the senior German Athletics Championships title for the first time in June 2022, ahead of the experienced campaigner and defending champion Tristan Schwandke.

Competing in Andujar, Spain in June 2023, Hummel won a meeting title on the World Continental Tour with a personal best of 76.28 meters. He was a 2023 European Athletics U23 Championships silver medallist in Espoo, Finland in July 2023 behind Mykhaylo Kokhan but beating compatriot Soren Klose. He competed at the 2023 World Athletics Championships in Budapest, Hungary, but suffered a slipped disk to his back.

Hummel won the German Winter Throwing Cup in Halle with a throw of 75.45 metres in February 2024. He set a new personal best of 77.65 metres in Langenbrand in May 2024.

Hummel threw 79.25 metres to set a European U23 lead at the 2024 European Athletics Championships in Rome, Italy in June 2024, and ultimately placed fourth overall. He competed in the hammer throw at the 2024 Olympics Games, in Paris, France, placing tenth overall with a throw of 76.03 metres.

In May 2025 in Halle, Hummel threw a lifetime best 80.11 metres and became the first German in 18 years to break the 80 metres-barrier. He then threw a personal best of 81.23 m in winning the Hammerwurf-Meeting in Fränkisch-Crumbach, Germany in June 2025. He represented Germany at the 2025 European Athletics Team Championships, where he threw a personal best of 81.27 metres, to finish second in the First Division. He finished third at the 2025 Kamila Skolimowska Memorial, in Poland, on 16 August.

In September 2025, Hummel was a silver medalist competing in the hammer throw at the 2025 World Championships in Tokyo, Japan, with a personal best throw of 82.77 metres.

In July 2026, Hummel threw 79.01 metres to place third in the hammer throw at the 2026 Prefontaine Classic. On 11 August, Hummel won the silver medal in the hammer throw at the 2026 European Athletics Championships in Birmingham. On 23 August, he placed second with 81.25 metres at the 2026 Kamila Skolimowska Memorial in Silesia, Poland. On 11 September, he won the hammer throw competition at the inaugural World Ultimate Championship in Budapest, leading from the first round with a throw of 81.46m.

== Personal life ==
He is from Burghaig in the Kulmbach district of Bavaria.
