= Ragnar Carlsson =

Swedish athlete

Personal information
- Born: 16 December 2000 (age 25) Ljungby, Sweden

Sport
- Sport: Hammer throw

Ragnar Erik Georg Carlsson (born 16 November 2000) is a Swedish hammer thrower who has competed in several international events, among them the 2024 Summer Olympics.

== Career ==
Carlsson was born in Ljungby on 16 November 2000. As a Falu IK athlete, he left his youth career with a Swedish under-19 record in the hammer throw, set in 2018. He then switched to Stockholm club Hässelby SK in the end of 2019. After different inflammations had disturbed his 2019 season, he won the Swedish national title in 2020.

Carlsson competed at the 2022 World Athletics Championships in Eugene in the men's hammer throw.

Carlsson competed at the 2023 World Athletics Championships in Budapest in the hammer throw.

Carlsson competed in the 2024 European Championships in Rome in the hammer throw.

Carlsson was selected to compete for Sweden in the 2024 Paris Olympics. Carlsson failed to reach the final in the hammer throw event.
