= Thomas Mardal =

Norwegian athlete (born 1997)

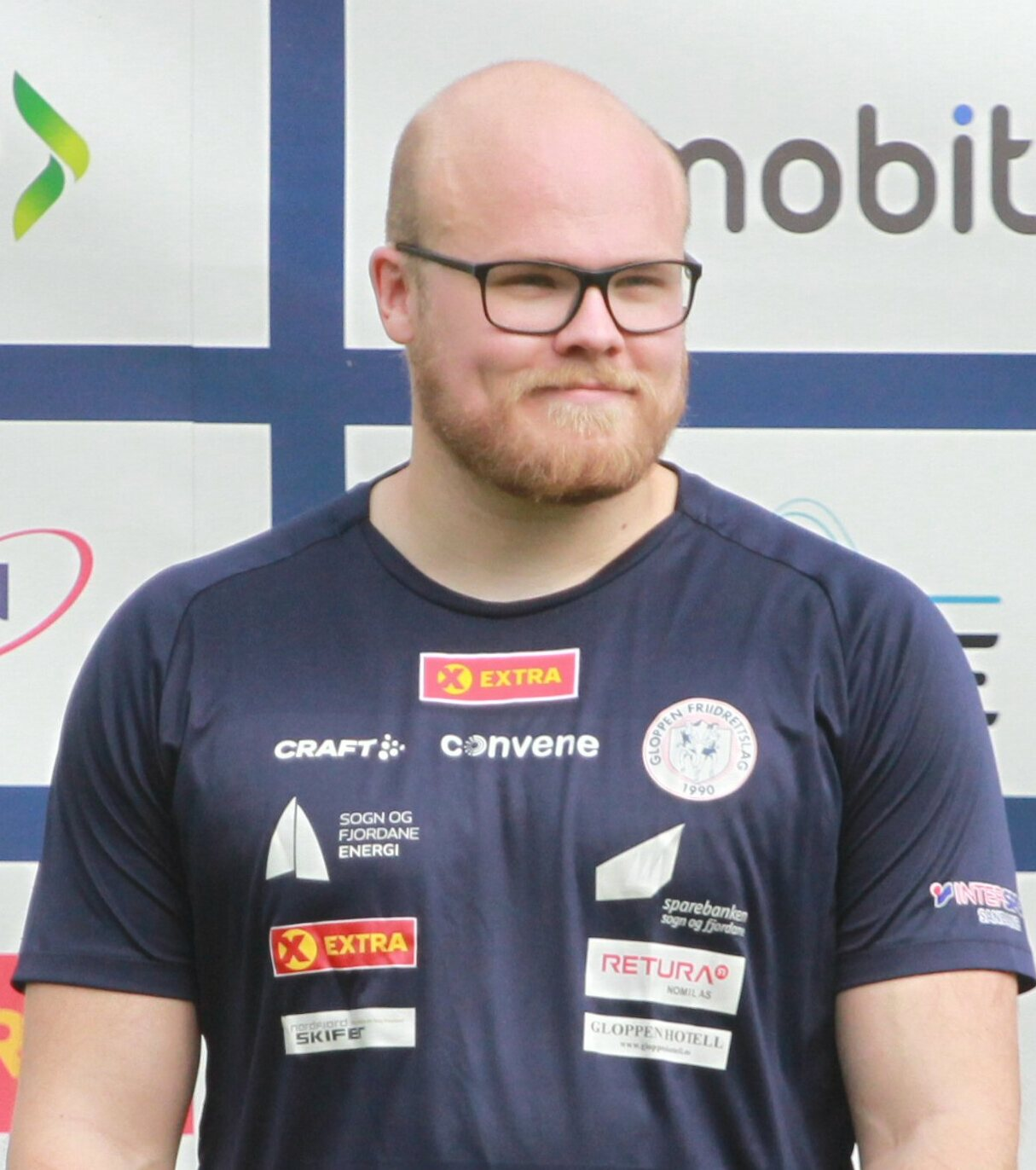
- Mardal in 2022

Personal information
- Born: 16 April 1997 (age 29) Gloppen Municipality, Norway

Sport
- Sport: Athletics
- Event: Hammer throw

Achievements and titles
- Personal bests: Hammer: 78.66m (Bergen, 2026)
Medal record
Men's athletics
Representing Norway
European Throwing Cup
Bronze medal – third place	2025 Nicosia	Hammer Throw

Thomas Mardal (born 16 April 1997) is a Norwegian hammer thrower. He has competed at multiple major championships, including the 2024 Olympic Games. He won NCAA championships titles in both the weight throw and the hammer throw.

== Biography ==
Whilst attending the University of Florida he became NCAA champion in the weight throw. He broke the Norwegian national record in the weight throw in February 2021, achieving a distance of 24.16 metres. He also became 2021 NCAA champion in the hammer throw. That year, he improved his personal best in the hammer throw to improved his lifetime best in the hammer to 76.18m whilst competing in Kingston, Jamaica.

He competed at the 2022 World Athletics Championships in Eugene, Oregon in the men's hammer throw, where his throw of 72.90 metres was insufficient to proceed to the final of the championships.

He finished runner-up at the 2023 European Throwing Cup in Portugal with a throw of 73.94 metres. He competed at the 2023 World Athletics Championships in Budapest, Hungary, where he managed a distance of 73.13 metres but did not progress to the final of the hammer throw.

He competed in the 2024 European Championships in Rome, Italy in the hammer throw where his best throw of 71.16 metres was not enough to qualify for the final. He competed in the hammer throw at the 2024 Paris Olympics, placing eleventh overall.

He won the bronze medal in the hammer at the 2025 European Throwing Cup in Nicosia, Cyprus, in March 2025. He finished third with a personal best 78.25 metres at the 2025 Bislett Games in Oslo on 12 June 2025. He won the hammer throw for Norway at the 2025 European Athletics Team Championships Second Division in Maribor on 28 June. In September 2025, he placed sixth overall competing in the hammer throw at the 2025 World Championships in Tokyo, Japan.

In May 2026, Mardel threw a new personal best of 78.66 metres in Bergen. In August, he competed at the 2026 European Athletics Championships in Birmingham, England, in the hammer throw.

== Personal life ==
He is the son of the former long jumper Ole Morten Mardal.
