= Dániel Rába =

Hungarian athlete

Daniel Rába
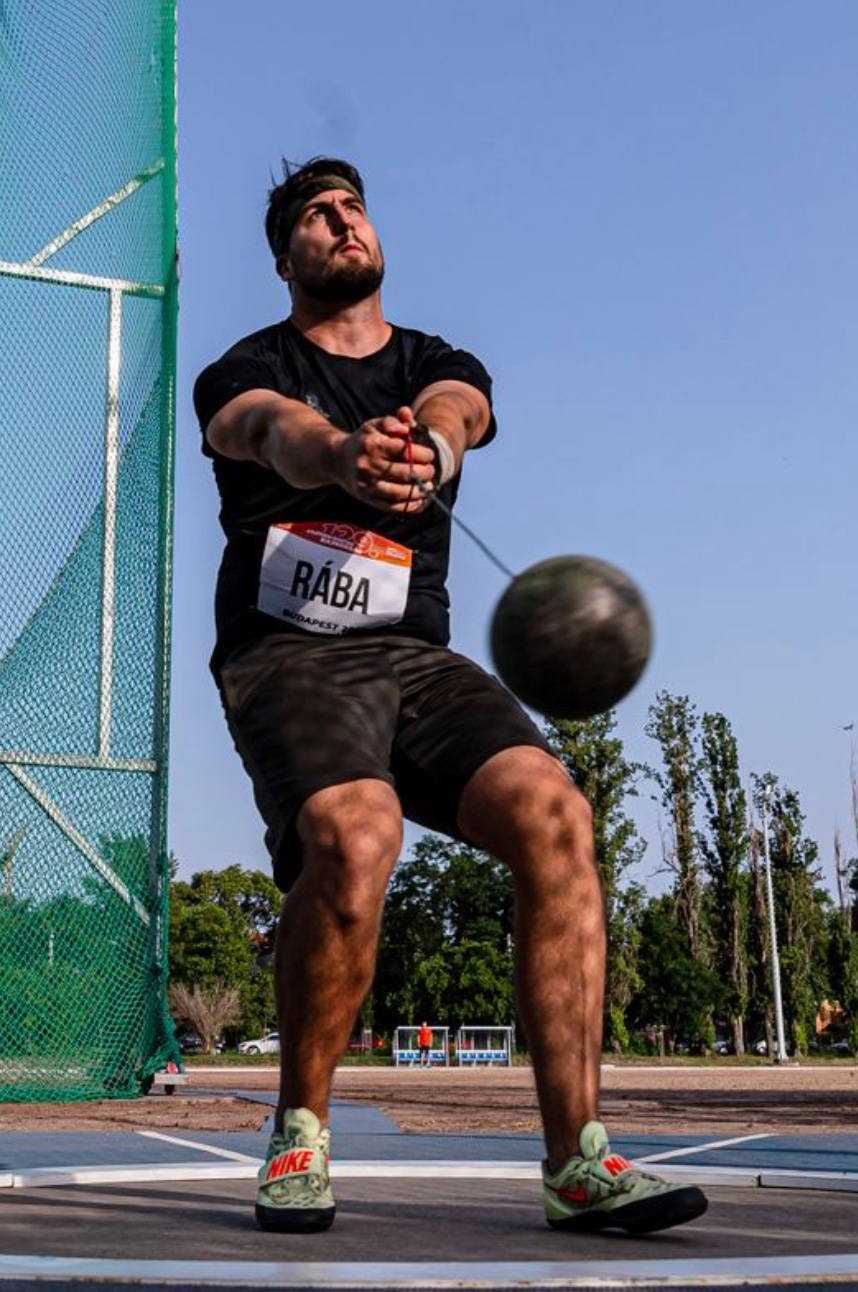
- Dániel at MTK Hammer Throw Field

Personal information
- Nationality: Hungarian
- Born: 24 April 1998 (age 28) Szombathely
- Height: 196
- Weight: 118

Sport
- Sport: Athletics
- Event: Hammer throw

Achievements and titles
- Personal bests: Hammer: 76.83m (Szombathely, 2021)
Medal record
Men's athletics
Representing Hungary
European U20 Championships
Bronze medal – third place	2017 Grosseto	Hammer throw

Dániel Rába (born 24 April 1998) is a Hungarian hammer thrower. He competed at the 2024 Olympic Games.

== Career ==
He is a member of Szombathelyi Dobó SE where he is a teammate of fellow Hungarian international hammer thrower Bence Halasz. He finished in fourth place in the hammer throw at the 2016 IAAF World U20 Championships in Bydgoszcz, Poland, won by compatriot Bence Halasz. He was a bronze medalist at the 2017 European Athletics U20 Championships in the hammer throw in Grosseto, Italy. In June 2020, he increased his personal best to 73.85 metres whilst competing in Szombathely.

He increased his personal best to 76.83 metres whilst competing in Szombathely in 2021. He competed at the 2023 World Athletics Championships in Budapest in the hammer throw where he threw 73.17 metres, without progressing to the final.

He competed in the 2024 European Championships in Rome, Italy in the hammer throw where his best throw was 72.52 metres and he did not qualify for the final. That month, he became Hungarian national champion in the hammer for the first time with victory at the Hungarian Athletics Championships with a throw of 73.99 metres at the Lantos Mihály Sports Centre. The rankings points accrued from the win pushed him into 32nd place in the world rankings - with the top 32 athletes qualifying for the upcoming Olympics by ranking. He subsequently competed in the hammer throw at the 2024 Olympic Games in Paris, France, where he achieved a throw of 72.29 metres which was not enough to qualify for the final, although he outperformed his 32nd-place ranking, finishing twelfth out of sixteen in his qualifying group.

In September 2025, he competed in the hammer throw at the 2025 World Championships in Tokyo, Japan, placing eleventh overall.
