= Mykhaylo Kokhan =

Ukrainian hammer thrower (born 2001)

Mykhaylo Kokhan Mykhailo Kokhan
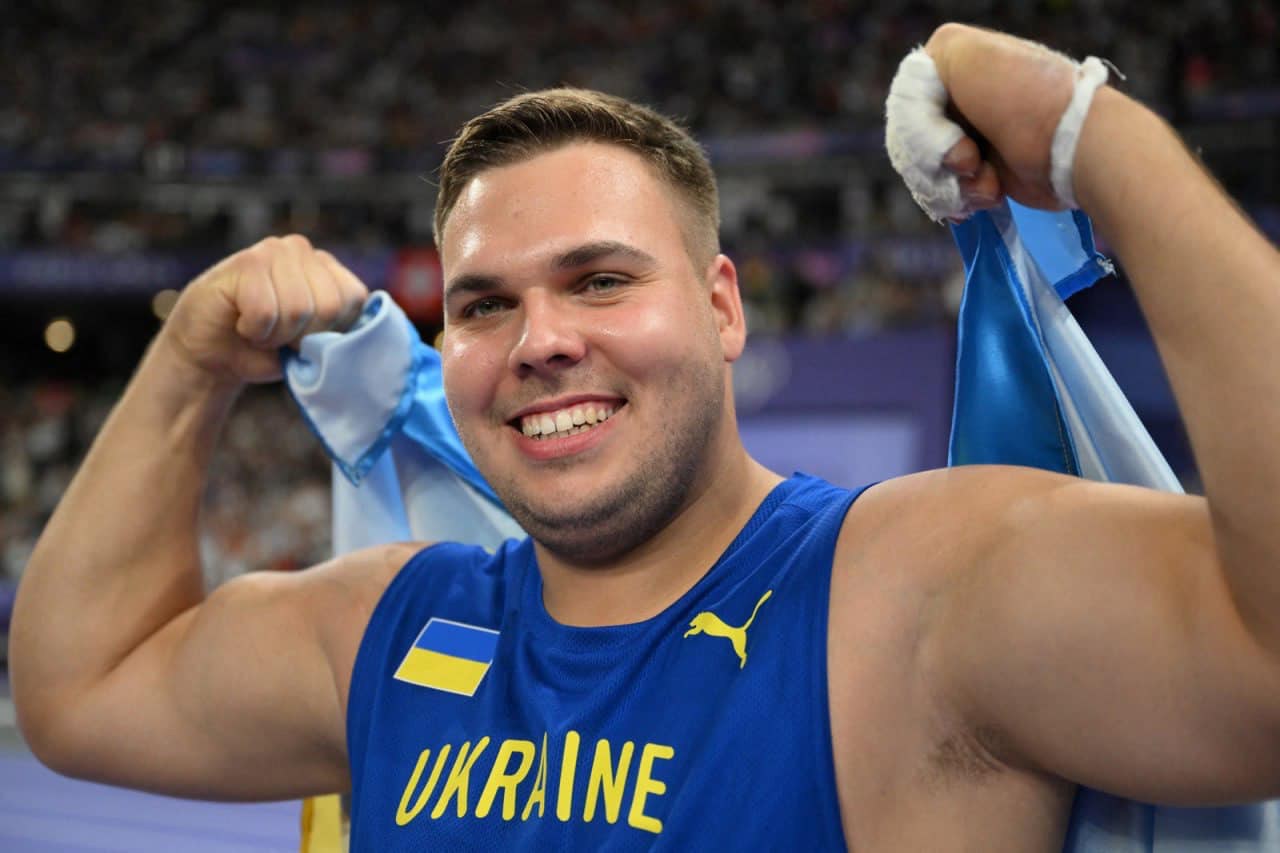
- Mykhaylo Kokhan at the 2024 Summer Olympics

Personal information
- Born: 22 January 2001 (age 25) Zaporizhzhia, Ukraine
- Height: 1.82 m (6 ft 0 in)
- Weight: 103 kg (227 lb)

Sport
- Sport: Athletics
- Event: Hammer throw
Medal record
Men's athletics
Representing Ukraine
Olympic Games
Bronze medal – third place	2024 Paris	Hammer throw
World Ultimate Championship
Third place	2026 Budapest	Hammer throw
European Championships
Bronze medal – third place	2024 Rome	Hammer throw
Bronze medal – third place	2026 Birmingham	Hammer throw
European Games
Silver medal – second place	2023 Kraków–Małopolska	Hammer throw
Summer World University Games
Gold medal – first place	2025 Bochum	Hammer throw
European U23 Championships
Gold medal – first place	2021 Tallinn	Hammer throw
Gold medal – first place	2023 Espoo	Hammer throw
World U20 Championships
Silver medal – second place	2018 Tampere	Hammer throw
European U20 Championships
Gold medal – first place	2019 Borås	Hammer throw
Youth Olympics
Gold medal – first place	2018 Buenos Aires	Hammer throw
World U18 Championships
Gold medal – first place	2017 Nairobi	Hammer throw
European Youth Olympic Festival
Gold medal – first place	2017 Győr	Hammer throw

Mykhaylo Kokhan or Mykhailo Serhiiovych Kokhan (Ukrainian: Михайло Сергійович Кохан; born 22 January 2001) is a Ukrainian athlete specialising in the hammer throw. He won the bronze medal at the 2024 Summer Olympics.

== Career ==
He represented his country at the 2019 World Championships finishing fifth the final.

His personal best with a senior implement was 82.02 m metres set at the 2025 World Athletics Championships in Tokyo.

== International competitions ==
Year	Competition	Venue	Position	Event	Notes
Representing Ukraine
2017	World U18 Championships	Nairobi, Kenya	1st	Hammer throw (5 kg)	82.31 m
2017	European Youth Olympic Festival	Győr, Hungary	1st	Hammer throw (5 kg)	78.28 m
2018	World U20 Championships	Tampere, Finland	2nd	Hammer throw (6 kg)	79.68 m
2018	Youth Olympic Games	Buenos Aires, Argentina	1st	Hammer throw (5 kg)	85.97 m + 85.14 m^{1}
2019	European Throwing Cup (U23)	Šamorín, Slovakia	1st	Hammer throw	76.68 m
2019	European U20 Championships	Borås, Sweden	1st	Hammer throw (6 kg)	84.73 m (EU20R CR)
2019	World Championships	Doha, Qatar	5th	Hammer throw	77.39 m
2021	European U23 Championships	Tallinn, Estonia	1st	Hammer throw	77.88 m
2021	Olympic Games	Tokyo, Japan	4th	Hammer throw	80.39 m
2022	World Championships	Eugene, United States	7th	Hammer throw	78.83 m
2022	European Championships	Munich, Germany	5th	Hammer throw	78.48 m
2023	European U23 Championships	Espoo, Finland	1st	Hammer throw	77.21 m
2023	World Championships	Budapest, Hungary	5th	Hammer throw	79.59 m
2024	European Championships	Rome, Italy	3rd	Hammer throw	80.18 m
2024	Olympic Games	Paris, France	3rd	Hammer throw	79.39 m
2025	World University Games	Bochum, Germany	1st	Hammer throw	77.10 m
2025	World Championships	Tokyo, Japan	4th	Hammer throw	82.02 m
2026	European Championships	Birmingham, United Kingdom	3rd	Hammer throw	79.49 m
2026	World Ultimate Championship	Budapest, Hungary	3rd	Hammer throw	78.90 m

^{1}Sum of the best marks in the two stages.
