= Bence Halász =

Hungarian hammer thrower

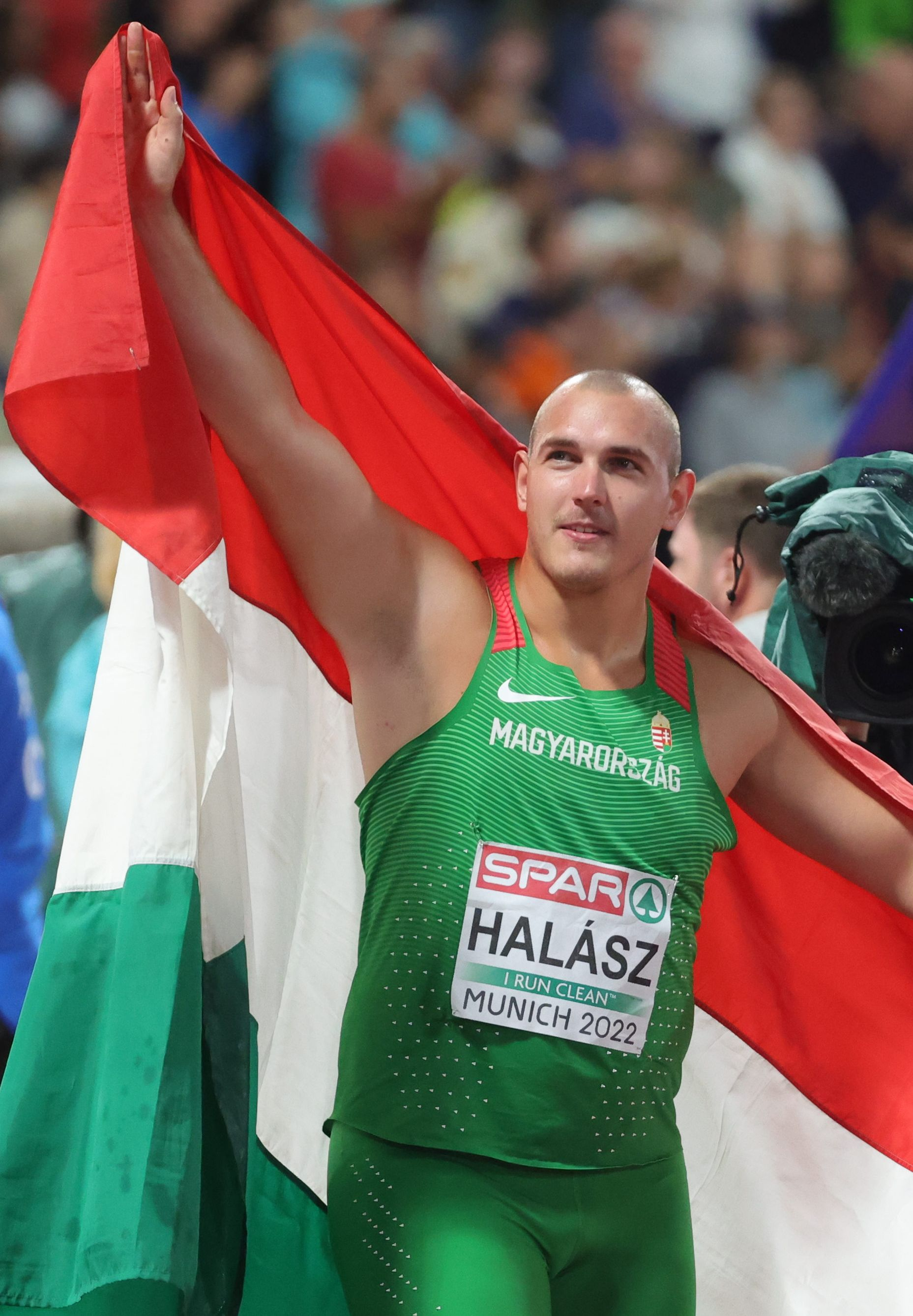
- Halász in 2022

Personal information
- Nationality: Hungarian
- Born: 4 August 1997 (age 29) Kiskunhalas, Hungary
- Height: 1.88 m (6 ft 2 in)
- Weight: 116 kg (256 lb)

Sport
- Country: Hungary
- Sport: Athletics
- Event: Hammer throw
- Club: Dobó SE
- Coached by: Zsolt Németh; László Németh

Achievements and titles
- Personal bests: 84.25 m (276 ft 4 3/4 in) (Birmingham 2026) NR
Medal record
Men's athletics
Representing Hungary
Olympic Games
Silver medal – second place	2024 Paris	Hammer throw
World Championships
Bronze medal – third place	2019 Doha	Hammer throw
Bronze medal – third place	2023 Budapest	Hammer throw
Bronze medal – third place	2025 Tokyo	Hammer throw
World Ultimate Championship
Second place	2026 Budapest	Hammer throw
World U20 Championships
Gold medal – first place	2016 Bydgoszcz	Hammer throw
European Championships
Gold medal – first place	2026 Birmingham	Hammer throw
Silver medal – second place	2022 Munich	Hammer throw
Silver medal – second place	2024 Rome	Hammer throw
Bronze medal – third place	2018 Berlin	Hammer throw
European Throwing Cup
Gold medal – first place	2025 Nicosia	Hammer Throw

Bence Halász (born 4 August 1997) is a Hungarian athlete specialising in the hammer throw. He won the silver medal at the 2024 Paris Summer Olympics and also the bronze medal at the 2019 and the 2023 World Championships. In 2026, he won the gold medal at the European Athletics Championships.

His personal best in the event is 84.25 m, the Hungarian record, set at the 2026 European Athletics Championships in Birmingham on 11 August 2026. Early in his career, he also competed in the discus throw.

== International competitions ==
Year	Competition	Venue	Position	Event	Notes
Representing Hungary
2013	World Youth Championships	Donetsk, Ukraine	8th	Discus throw (1.5 kg)	57.83 m
2013	World Youth Championships	Donetsk, Ukraine	7th	Hammer throw (5 kg)	74.90 m
2013	European Youth Summer Olympic Festival	Utrecht, Netherlands	1st	Discus throw (1.5 kg)	61.13 m
2013	European Youth Summer Olympic Festival	Utrecht, Netherlands	1st	Hammer throw (5 kg)	74.63 m
2014	World Junior Championships	Eugene, United States	35th (q)	Discus throw (1.75 kg)	52.90 m
2014	World Junior Championships	Eugene, United States	14th (q)	Hammer throw (6 kg)	71.95 m
2014	Youth Olympic Games	Nanjing, China	2nd	Hammer throw (5 kg)	81.90 m
2015	European Junior Championships	Eskilstuna, Sweden	15th (q)	Discus throw (1.75 kg)	53.78 m
2015	European Junior Championships	Eskilstuna, Sweden	1st	Hammer throw (6 kg)	79.60 m
2016	European Throwing Cup (U23)	Arad, Romania	2nd	Hammer throw	71.16 m
2016	World U20 Championships	Bydgoszcz, Poland	35th (q)	Discus throw (1.75 kg)	52.90 m
2016	World U20 Championships	Bydgoszcz, Poland	1st	Hammer throw (6 kg)	80.93 m
2017	European Throwing Cup (U23)	Las Palmas, Spain	2nd	Hammer throw	71.51 m
2017	European U23 Championships	Bydgoszcz, Poland	1st	Hammer throw	73.30 m
2017	World Championships	London, United Kingdom	11th	Hammer throw	74.45 m
2017	Universiade	Taipei, Taiwan	4th	Hammer throw	73.79 m
2018	European Championships	Berlin, Germany	3rd	Hammer throw	77.36 m
2019	European U23 Championships	Gävle, Sweden	2nd	Hammer throw	74.14 m
2019	World Championships	Doha, Qatar	3rd	Hammer throw	78.18 m
2021	Olympic Games	Tokyo, Japan	14th (q)	Hammer throw	75.39 m
2022	World Championships	Eugene, United States	5th	Hammer throw	80.15 m
2022	European Championship	Munich, Germany	2nd	Hammer throw	80.92 m
2023	World Championships	Budapest, Hungary	3rd	Hammer throw	80.82 m
2024	European Championships	Rome, Italy	2nd	Hammer throw	80.49 m
2024	Olympic Games	Paris, France	2nd	Hammer throw	79.97 m
2025	World Championships	Tokyo, Japan	3rd	Hammer throw	82.69 m
2026	European Championships	Birmingham, Great Britain	1st	Hammer throw	84.25 m NR
2026	World Ultimate Championship	Budapest, Hungary	2nd	Hammer throw	80.30 m
