= Matija Gregurić =

Croatian hammer thrower

Personal information
- Born: 17 September 1996 (age 29) Zabok, Croatia
- Height: 1.87 m (6 ft 2 in)

Sport
- Country: Croatia
- Sport: Athletics
- Event: Hammer throw

Achievements and titles
- Personal best: 76.68 m (2025)
Medal record
Men's athletics
Representing Croatia
Mediterranean Games
Bronze medal – third place	2026 Taranto	Hammer throw

Matija Gregurić (born 17 September 1996) is a Croatian male hammer thrower, who won an individual gold medal at the Youth World Championships. He is multiple Croatian state champion (2018, 2022–2025). He participated at the 2024 Olympics.
