= Yann Chaussinand =

French hammer thrower (born 1998)

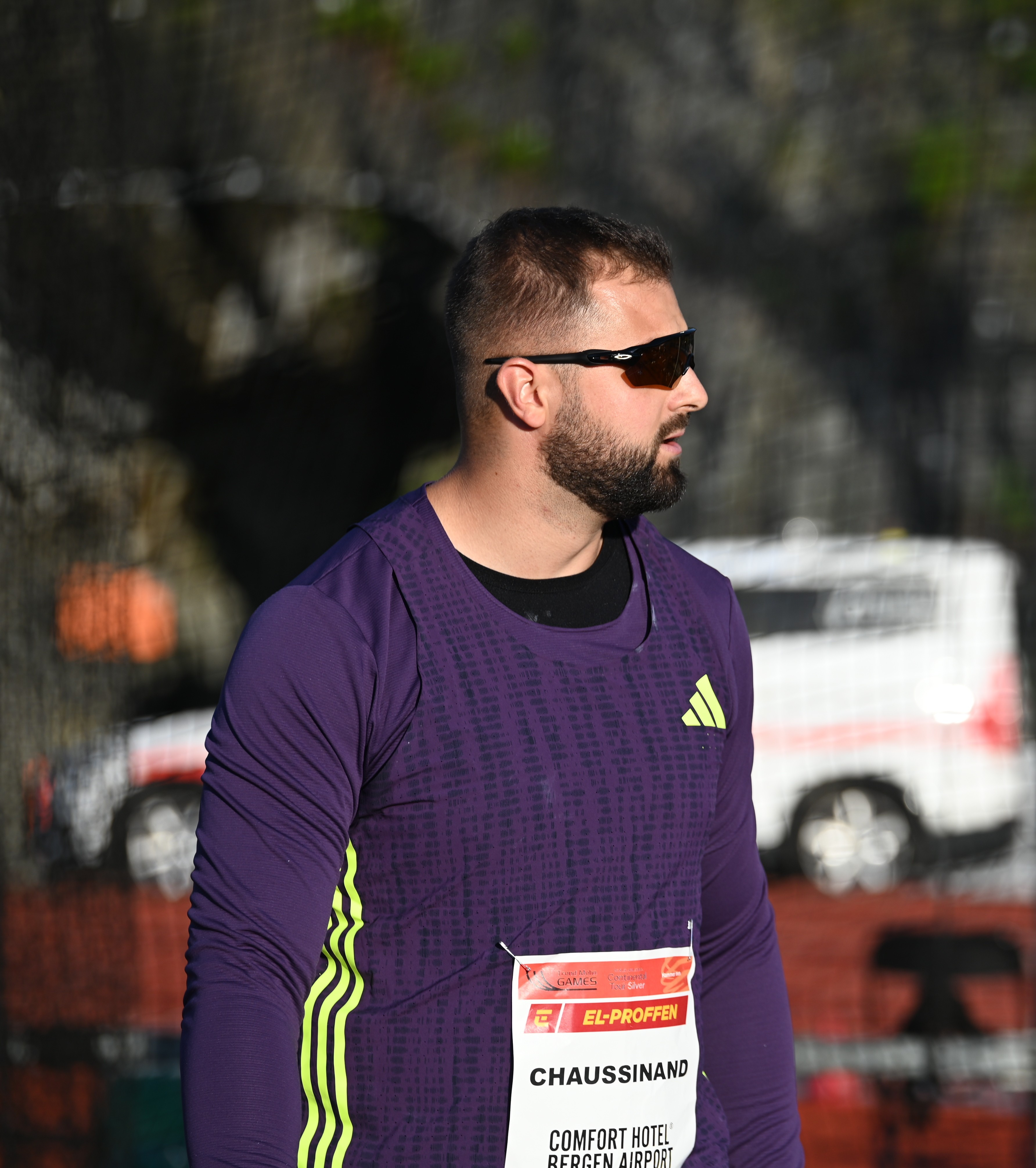
- Chaussinand in 2026

Personal information
- Born: 11 May 1998 (age 28) Clermont-Ferrand, France
- Height: 196 cm (6 ft 5 in)
- Weight: 110 kg (243 lb)
Medal record
Men's athletics
Representing France
Mediterranean U23 Championships
Gold medal – first place	2018 Jesolo	Hammer throw

Yann Chaussinand (born 11 May 1998 in Clermont-Ferrand) is a French hammer thrower.

He won the 2018 Mediterranean Athletics U23 Championships. His personal best is 82.44 m.

Chaussinand competed for France at the 2024 Summer Olympics.
