= 2012 European Cup Winter Throwing =

2012 European Throwing Cup
- Events: 16

The 2012 European Cup Winter Throwing was held on 17 and 18 March at the Stadion Topolica in Bar, Montenegro. It was the twelfth edition of the athletics competition for throwing events and was jointly organised by the European Athletic Association and the Athletic Federation of Montenegro. The competition featured men's and women's contests in shot put, discus throw, javelin throw and hammer throw. In addition to the senior competitions, there were also under-23 events for younger athletes. A total of 294 athletes from 39 European countries entered the competition.

On the first day of the competition, Nadzeya Ostapchuk produced a throw of 20.29 m to win the shot put, while Martina Ratej took the women's javelin title. Dutchman Erik Cadée won the men's discus and Kirill Ikonnikov took the hammer title for Russia. In the men's under-23 discus event, home athlete Danijel Furtula threw a Montenegrin record to win the gold. The highlights of the second day were Nadine Müller's personal best of 68.89 m to win the women's discus (the best performance in the world in eight years) and Marco Fortes won the men's shot put in a Portuguese record and world-leading throw if 21.02 m. Turkish thrower Fatih Avan won the men's javelin and Zalina Marghieva broke the Moldovan record to beat Tatyana Lysenko to the women's hammer throw title.

Five national records were broken at the event. The non-medallists who achieved this feat were: Kateřina Šafránková (fourth in the women's hammer with 71.16 m), Danijel Furtula (17.10 m in the men's under-23 shot put), and Tiago Aperta (fourth in the men's under-23 javelin with 75.55 m). In the team rankings, Russia claimed both the senior titles while Ukraine won both the under-23 sections.

== Medal summary ==
=== Senior ===
Men
Event	Gold		Silver		Bronze	
Shot put	Marco Fortes (POR)	21.02 m NR	Asmir Kolašinac (SRB)	20.50 m	Borja Vivas (ESP)	20.06 m
Discus throw	Erik Cadée (NED)	64.09 m	Ercüment Olgundeniz (TUR)	63.59 m	Rutger Smith (NED)	63.30 m
Hammer throw	Kirill Ikonnikov (RUS)	75.95 m	Siarhei Kalamoets (BLR)	75.15 m	Kristóf Németh (HUN)	74.23 m
Javelin throw	Fatih Avan (TUR)	81.09 m	Dmitri Tarabin (RUS)	79.94 m	Risto Mätas (EST)	78.74 m
WR world record | AR area record | CR championship record | GR games record | NR national record | OR Olympic record | PB personal best | SB season best | WL world leading (in a given season)

Women
Event	Gold		Silver		Bronze	
Shot put	Nadzeya Ostapchuk (BLR)	20.29 m	Nadine Kleinert (GER)	19.12 m	Josephine Terlecki (GER)	18.59 m
Discus throw	Nadine Müller (GER)	68.89 m	Darya Pishchalnikova (RUS)	63.86 m	Mélina Robert-Michon (FRA)	63.03 m
Hammer throw	Zalina Marghieva (MDA)	73.60 m NR	Tatyana Lysenko (RUS)	72.87 m	Stéphanie Falzon (FRA)	72.60 m
Javelin throw	Martina Ratej (SLO)	63.59 m	Goldie Sayers (GBR)	62.75 m	Marina Maksimova (RUS)	60.33 m
WR world record | AR area record | CR championship record | GR games record | NR national record | OR Olympic record | PB personal best | SB season best | WL world leading (in a given season)

=== Under-23 ===
Under-23 men
Event	Gold		Silver		Bronze	
Shot put	Marin Premeru (CRO)	19.49 m	Dmytro Savytskyy (UKR)	18.76 m	Maksim Afonin (RUS)	18.73 m
Discus throw	Danijel Furtula (MNE)	60.24 m NR	Eduardo Albertazzi (ITA)	58.26 m	Daniel Ståhl (SWE)	57.45 m
Hammer throw	Eivind Henriksen (NOR)	73.62 m	Andriy Martynyuk (UKR)	71.37 m	Pavel Bareisha (BLR)	69.16 m
Javelin throw	Oleksandr Nychyporchuk (UKR)	76.23 m	Jaka Muhar (SLO)	75.94 m NJR	Valeriy Iordan (RUS)	75.58 m

Under 23 women
Event	Gold		Silver		Bronze	
Shot put	Sophie Kleeberg (GER)	17.42 m	Olha Holodna (UKR)	17.32 m	Emel Dereli (TUR)	16.87 m NJR
Discus throw	Sandra Perković (CRO)	67.19 m	Irina Rodrigues (POR)	54.83 m	Yuliya Kurylo (UKR)	52.03 m
Hammer throw	Bianca Perie (ROM)	68.74 m	Alina Kastrova (BLR)	67.86 m	Anna Skydan (UKR)	66.35 m
Javelin throw	Sanni Utriainen (FIN)	57.39 m	Lyubov Zhatkina (RUS)	55.77 m	Kateryna Derun (UKR)	55.67 m
