= 2008 World Junior Championships in Athletics – Men's hammer throw =

The men's hammer throw event at the 2008 World Junior Championships in Athletics was held in Bydgoszcz, Poland, at Zawisza Stadium on 10 and 12 July. A 6 kg (junior implement) hammer was used.

== Medalists ==
Gold	Walter Henning; United States
Silver	Conor McCullough; United States
Bronze	Aleh Dubitski; Belarus

== Results ==
=== Final ===
12 July

Rank	Name	Nationality	Attempts						Result	Notes
Rank	Name	Nationality	1	2	3	4	5	6	Result	Notes
1st place, gold medalist(s)	Walter Henning	United States	76.14	x	74.23	76.13	70.18	76.92	76.92	
2nd place, silver medalist(s)	Conor McCullough	United States	67.74	70.73	75.88	74.07	74.24	73.50	75.88	
3rd place, bronze medalist(s)	Aleh Dubitski	Belarus	x	71.82	75.42	x	x	x	75.42	
4	Paweł Fajdek	Poland	71.78	75.31	x	72.76	x	75.24	75.31	
5	Siarhei Kalamoets	Belarus	74.22	x	x	72.72	x	71.46	74.22	
6	Dániel Szabó	Hungary	72.04	73.34	73.56	72.03	x	x	73.56	
7	Ákos Hudi	Hungary	72.58	x	73.31	71.56	72.03	72.55	73.31	
8	Markus Johansson	Sweden	69.57	72.97	72.95	72.16	72.75	x	72.97	
9	Andrey Martynyuk	Ukraine	70.37	72.26	x				72.26	
10	Denis Lukyanov	Russia	x	65.11	70.77				70.77	
11	Mirko Micuda	Croatia	69.23	x	70.41				70.41	
12	Javier Cienfuegos	Spain	x	65.93	x				65.93	

=== Qualifications ===
10 July

==== Group A ====
Rank	Name	Nationality	Attempts			Result	Notes
Rank	Name	Nationality	1	2	3	Result	Notes
1	Ákos Hudi	Hungary	72.22	72.86	70.70	72.86	q
2	Andrey Martynyuk	Ukraine	x	x	72.83	72.83	q
3	Markus Johansson	Sweden	68.37	71.69	71.99	71.99	q
4	Siarhei Kalamoets	Belarus	71.90	70.89	x	71.90	q
5	Walter Henning	United States	x	66.10	71.43	71.43	q
6	Paweł Fajdek	Poland	x	70.84	x	70.84	q
7	Mirko Micuda	Croatia	69.94	x	68.17	69.94	q
8	Khaled Shawki Wanis	Egypt	65.77	68.17	69.42	69.42	
9	Tomaž Bogovic	Slovenia	x	66.93	68.55	68.55	
10	Ignacio López	Spain	x	64.08	66.46	66.46	
11	Erwan Cassier	France	65.18	63.44	x	65.18	
12	Harri Santala	Finland	64.04	64.84	65.04	65.04	
13	Mart Olman	Estonia	x	61.67	x	61.67	
14	Amanmurad Hommadov	Turkmenistan	x	61.11	x	61.11	
	Eivind Henriksen	Norway	x	x	x	NM	

==== Group B ====
Rank	Name	Nationality	Attempts			Result	Notes
Rank	Name	Nationality	1	2	3	Result	Notes
1	Conor McCullough	United States	72.82	x	69.04	72.82	q
2	Aleh Dubitski	Belarus	x	x	71.84	71.84	q
3	Dániel Szabó	Hungary	71.27	68.99	67.15	71.27	q
4	Javier Cienfuegos	Spain	70.42	x	x	70.42	q
5	Denis Lukyanov	Russia	70.04	69.75	66.83	70.04	q
6	Alaa El-Din	Egypt	67.59	69.19	66.69	69.19	
7	Richard Olbrich	Germany	69.02	x	68.32	69.02	
8	Kai Räsänen	Finland	x	68.07	64.98	68.07	
9	Sergey Kravchenko	Ukraine	x	66.94	x	66.94	
10	Norbert Rauhut	Poland	x	66.75	61.14	66.75	
11	Park Yeong-Sik	South Korea	x	64.76	62.06	64.76	
12	Maxime Rolnin	France	62.04	59.53	64.68	64.68	
13	Michael Kolokotronis	Cyprus	63.18	x	60.42	63.18	
14	Alisher Eshbekov	Tajikistan	x	55.31	59.06	59.06	
15	Indrek Masing	Estonia	x	55.33	x	55.33	

== Participation ==
According to an unofficial count, 30 athletes from 20 countries participated in the event.

- Belarus (2)
- Croatia (1)
- Cyprus (1)
- Egypt (2)
- Estonia (2)
- Finland (2)
- France (2)
- Germany (1)
- Hungary (2)
- Norway (1)
- Poland (2)
- Russia (1)
- Slovenia (1)
- South Korea (1)
- Spain (2)
- Sweden (1)
- Tajikistan (1)
- Turkmenistan (1)
- Ukraine (2)
- United States (2)
