= Athletics at the 2016 Summer Olympics – Men's hammer throw =

Men's hammer throw at the Games of the XXXI Olympiad
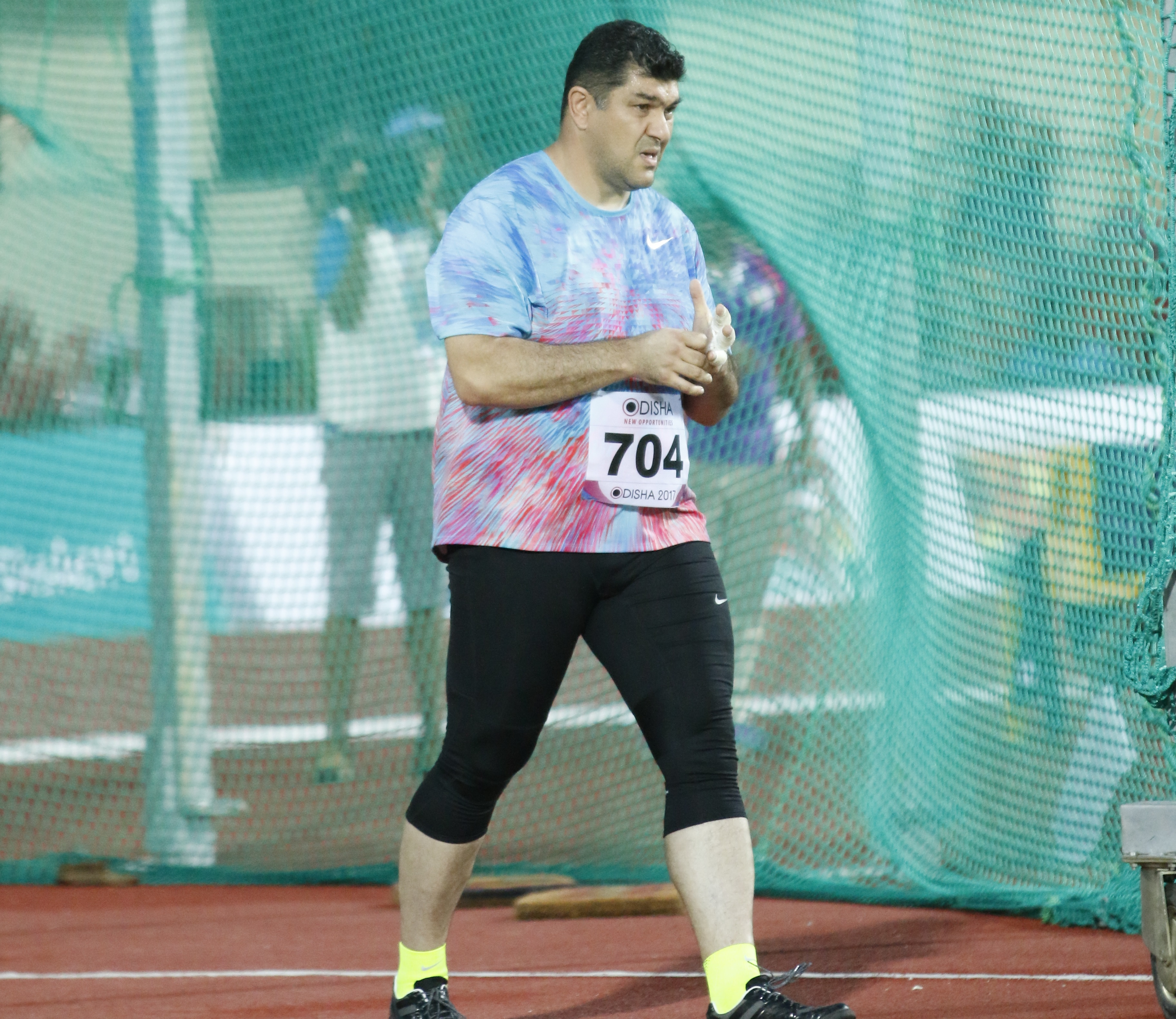
- Dilshod Nazarov (2017)
- Venue: Estádio Olímpico João Havelange
- Dates: 17–19 August 2016
- Competitors: 32 from 24 nations
- Winning distance: 78.68

Medalists
1st place, gold medalist(s)		Dilshod Nazarov	Tajikistan
2nd place, silver medalist(s)		Ivan Tsikhan	Belarus
3rd place, bronze medalist(s)		Wojciech Nowicki	Poland

Official Video Highlights

The men's hammer throw was a competition at the 2016 Summer Olympics in Rio de Janeiro, Brazil. The event was held at the Estádio Olímpico João Havelange between 17–19 August. There were 32 competitors from 24 nations. The event was won by Dilshod Nazarov of Tajikistan, the nation's first medal in the men's hammer throw and first gold medal in any Olympic event. Ivan Tsikhan of Belarus took silver, the 14th man to win multiple medals in the event in adding to his 2008 bronze (which had made him temporarily the 12th man to do so before his 2004 silver medal was stripped in 2012). Bronze went to Wojciech Nowicki of Poland, the nation's first medal in the event since 2000.

== Background ==
This was the 27th appearance of the event, which has been held at every Summer Olympics except 1896. Four of the 12 finalists from the 2012 Games returned: gold medalist Krisztián Pars of Hungary, sixth-place finisher Lukáš Melich of the Czech Republic, ninth-place finisher Kibwe Johnson of the United States, and tenth-place finisher Dilshod Nazarov of Tajikistan. The two-time reigning World Champion (2013 and 2015), and the favorite in Rio de Janeiro, was Paweł Fajdek of Poland. Pars had been the runner-up (with Melich third) in 2013, Nazarov in 2015.

Costa Rica and Qater each made their debut in the event. The United States appeared for the 26th time, most of any nation, having missed only the boycotted 1980 Games.

== Summary ==
The hammer throw was an event that experienced a lot of problems. Initially the IAAF set the entry standard at 78.00 meters. With the ban of the Russian team from the Olympics, eliminating three top throwers in the world (and their potentially drug affected performances throwing off the bell curve), the IAAF had to lower the qualification standard to 77.00 meters. Still there were not sufficient qualified athletes to fill the quota of entries. Three American throwers Conor McCullough, Kibwé Johnson and Rudy Winkler, whose best marks were just below 77 meters, along with Amanmurad Hommadov, Javier Cienfuegos and Esref Apak were invited to fill the quota. Number 4 in the world qualifying Mostafa Al-Gamel and number 10 in 2016, Oleksandr Drygol did not enter. Drygol is a 50 year old, former Soviet thrower who switched his citizenship from Ukraine to Israel in 2016 in order to enter the Olympics. Dryhol would have been the oldest track and field athlete should have he competed.

With 76.50 m set as the automatic qualifying mark, only two athletes were able to manage the distance. One of them was 40 year old Ivan Tsikhan, who was previously stripped of a 2004 Olympic medal for doping and is only able to compete due to a second violation being overturned by the Court of Arbitration for Sport on a procedural technicality. Number one in the world, with the top 24 performances (meaning 24 separate meets) over the last two years, Paweł Fajdek, did not get out of the qualifying round, only managing 72.00 m to finish in 17th place. Highly ranked throwers Pavel Bareisha and Roberto Janet also did not get out of qualifying.

Tsikhan started the final with at 76.13 m as the first thrower in the competition. Two thrower later, Krisztián Pars managed a 74.77 m, but no other thrower in the round even threw that far until the last thrower, World Championships silver medalist Dilshod Nazarov edged ahead with a 76.16 m. On the next throw, at the beginning of the second round, Tsikhan improved his mark to 77.43 m, to again take the lead. During the round Pars improved his bronze medal position to 75.15. A few throwers later, Ashraf Amgad Elseify, a Sri Lankan born, Egyptian free agent throwing for Qatar threw 75.40, to move into third. Nazarov improved to 77.27 to sit in second place. In the third round, Diego del Real threw 76.05 to move into third. On the final throw of the round, Nazarov threw 78.07 to not only take the lead, but to earn the right to continue as the last thrower in the remaining rounds. It didn't matter because nobody was able to throw further. There were no leader improvements during the fourth round. In the fifth round, Marcel Lomnicky moved into fourth with a 75.97 and Elseify improved, before solidified his hold on silver with a 77.79, which Nazarov answered with a 78.68 m (258 ft 1 in) that proved to be the winner. Nazrov knew it was big, dropping to his knees in celebration before exiting the ring. In the final round, Wojciech Nowicki threw 77.73 m, to leap from seventh place to the bronze medal, just 6 cm out of silver. None of the other athletes were able to answer.

Nazarov won the first gold medal for Tajikistan.

The following evening the medals were presented by Irena Szewińska, IOC member, Poland and Sergey Bubka, Senior Vice President of the IAAF.

== Qualification ==
A National Olympic Committee (NOC) could enter up to 3 qualified athletes in the men's hammer throw event if all athletes meet the entry standard during the qualifying period. (The limit of 3 has been in place since the 1930 Olympic Congress.) The qualifying standard was 77.00 metres. The qualifying period was from 1 May 2015 to 11 July 2016. The qualifying distance standards could be obtained in various meets during the given period that have the approval of the IAAF. Only outdoor meets were accepted. NOCs could also use their universality place—each NOC could enter one male athlete regardless of time if they had no male athletes meeting the entry standard for an athletics event—in the hammer throw.

With only 23 athletes meeting the entry standard, invitational places were used to fill the field to 32 competitors.

== Competition format ==
Each athlete received three throws in the qualifying round. All who achieved the qualifying distance of 76.50 metres progressed to the final. If fewer than twelve athletes achieved this mark, then the twelve furthest throwing athletes reached the final. Each finalist was allowed three throws in last round, with the top eight athletes after that point being given three further attempts.

== Records ==
Prior to this competition, the existing world and Olympic records were as follows:

World record	Yuriy Sedykh (URS)	86.74	Stuttgart, Germany	30 August 1986
Olympic record	Sergey Litvinov (URS)	84.80	Seoul, South Korea	26 September 1988

No new world or Olympic records were set for this event.

== Schedule ==
All times are Brasilia Time (UTC-3)

Date	Time	Round
Wednesday, 17 August 2016	9:40	Qualifying
Friday, 19 August 2016	21:05	Final

== Results ==
=== Qualifying ===
Progression rules: qualifying performance 76.50 (Q) or at least 12 best performers (q) advance to the final.

Rank	Group	Athlete	Nation	1	2	3	Distance	Notes
1	B	Wojciech Nowicki	Poland	74.39	74.09	77.64	77.64	Q
2	B	Ivan Tsikhan	Belarus	76.51	—	—	76.51	Q
3	B	Dilshod Nazarov	Tajikistan	75.46	76.39	—	76.39	q
4	B	Krisztián Pars	Hungary	73.54	75.49	—	75.49	q
5	B	Diego del Real	Mexico	73.20	75.19	X	75.19	q
6	B	Serghei Marghiev	Moldova	74.97	73.74	X	74.97	q
7	B	David Söderberg	Finland	74.55	70.91	74.64	74.64	q
8	B	Siarhei Kalamoyets	Belarus	71.10	74.29	73.00	74.29	q
9	A	Wagner Domingos	Brazil	71.93	74.17	73.65	74.17	q
10	A	Marcel Lomnický	Slovakia	74.16	X	73.47	74.16	q
11	A	Yevhen Vynohradov	Ukraine	73.46	71.85	73.95	73.95	q
12	A	Ashraf Amgad Elseify	Qatar	72.99	72.62	73.47	73.47	q
13	A	Pavel Bareisha	Belarus	X	X	73.33	73.33	
14	A	Roberto Janet	Cuba	72.77	71.53	73.23	73.23	
15	B	Lukas Melich	Czech Republic	70.73	73.14	72.54	73.14	
16	B	Conor McCullough	United States	70.64	66.30	72.88	72.88	
17	A	Paweł Fajdek	Poland	X	71.33	72.00	72.00	
18	A	Rudy Winkler	United States	X	71.89	X	71.89	
19	B	Chris Bennett	Great Britain	68.44	70.47	71.32	71.32	
20	B	Mihail Anastasakis	Greece	71.07	X	71.28	71.28	
21	A	Mark Dry	Great Britain	70.26	X	71.03	71.03	
22	B	Nick Miller	Great Britain	X	X	70.83	70.83	
23	B	Suhrob Khodjaev	Uzbekistan	68.83	X	70.11	70.11	
24	B	Esref Apak	Turkey	X	X	70.08	70.08	
24	A	Roberto Sawyers	Costa Rica	70.08	X	X	70.08	
26	A	Mohamed Mahmoud Hassan	Egypt	68.47	67.38	69.87	69.87	
27	A	Javier Cienfuegos	Spain	68.88	69.73	68.69	69.73	
28	B	Pezhman Ghalehnoei	Iran	69.15	X	X	69.15	
29	A	Kaveh Mousavi	Iran	63.19	65.03	X	65.03	
30	A	Amanmurad Hommadov	Turkmenistan	61.55	61.99	X	61.99	
—	A	Kibwe Johnson	United States	X	X	X	NM	
—	A	Marco Lingua	Italy	X	X	X	NM	

=== Final ===
Rank	Athlete	Nation	1	2	3	4	5	6	Distance
1st place, gold medalist(s)	Dilshod Nazarov	Tajikistan	76.16	77.27	78.07	77.17	78.68	77.68	78.68
2nd place, silver medalist(s)	Ivan Tsikhan	Belarus	76.13	77.43	73.48	X	77.79	76.34	77.79
3rd place, bronze medalist(s)	Wojciech Nowicki	Poland	X	74.94	74.97	X	X	77.73	77.73
4	Diego del Real	Mexico	73.35	73.58	76.05	X	70.83	73.57	76.05
5	Marcel Lomnický	Slovakia	73.33	72.65	74.96	75.09	75.97	74.64	75.97
6	Ashraf Amgad Elseify	Qatar	73.88	75.40	74.45	75.20	75.46	74.25	75.46
7	Krisztián Pars	Hungary	74.77	75.15	75.28	74.89	74.62	X	75.28
8	David Söderberg	Finland	72.30	X	74.61	74.38	X	X	74.61
9	Siarhei Kalamoyets	Belarus	74.22	74.17	73.70	Did not advance			74.22
10	Serghei Marghiev	Moldova	73.31	74.14	X	Did not advance			74.14
11	Yevhen Vynohradov	Ukraine	73.39	X	74.11	Did not advance			74.11
12	Wagner Domingos	Brazil	X	71.97	72.28	Did not advance			72.28
