= 2016 European Athletics Championships – Men's hammer throw =

Men's hammer throw at the European Athletics Championships
- Venue: Olympic Stadium
- Location: Amsterdam
- Dates: 8 July (qualification); 10 July (final)
- Competitors: 28 from 17 nations
- Winning mark: 80.93 m

Medalists
gold medal	Paweł Fajdek	Poland
silver medal	Ivan Tsikhan	Belarus
bronze medal	Wojciech Nowicki	Poland

The men's hammer throw at the 2016 European Athletics Championships took place at the Olympic Stadium on 8 and 10 July.

== Records ==
Standing records prior to the 2014 European Athletics Championships
World record	Yuriy Sedykh (URS)	86.74 m	Stuttgart, West Germany	30 August 1986
European record	Yuriy Sedykh (URS)	86.74 m	Stuttgart, West Germany	30 August 1986
Championship record	Yuriy Sedykh (URS)	86.74 m	Stuttgart, West Germany	30 August 1986
World Leading	Paweł Fajdek (POL)	81.71 m	Bydgoszcz, Poland	5 June 2016
European Leading	Paweł Fajdek (POL)	81.71 m	Bydgoszcz, Poland	5 June 2016

== Schedule ==
Date	Time	Round
8 July 2016	12:30	Qualifying
10 July 2016	17:10	Final

All times are local times (UTC+2)

== Results ==
=== Qualification ===
Qualification: 75.00 m (Q) or best 12 performers (q)

Rank	Group	Name	Nationality	#1	#2	#3	Result	Note
1	B	Paweł Fajdek	Poland	x	x	78.82	78.82	Q
2	A	Ivan Tsikhan	Belarus	73.34	74.19	76.10	76.10	Q
3	A	Wojciech Nowicki	Poland	74.33	75.85		75.85	Q
4	B	Marcel Lomnický	Slovakia	72.97	74.68	x	74.68	q
5	B	Mihaíl Anastasakis	Greece	73.29	71.95	74.01	74.01	q
6	A	Chris Bennett	Great Britain	74.39	72.62	x	74.39	q
7	B	Serghei Marghiev	Moldova	73.95	x	x	73.95	q
8	B	Özkan Baltaci	Turkey	73.10	71.34	70.67	73.10	q
9	A	David Söderberg	Finland	72.96	x	70.19	72.96	q
10	B	Marco Lingua	Italy	72.94	x	x	72.94	q
11	B	Javier Cienfuegos	Spain	70.97	72.21	72.73	72.73	q
12	B	Siarhei Kalamoyets	Belarus	67.36	69.94	72.55	72.55	q
13	A	Andriy Martynyuk	Ukraine	x	72.15	72.37	72.37	
14	A	Pavel Bareisha	Belarus	70.71	72.19	x	72.19	
15	B	Mark Dry	Great Britain	71.65	69.59	71.96	71.96	
16	A	Eivind Henriksen	Norway	69.38	71.93	70.30	71.93	
17	A	Bence Pásztor	Hungary	70.56	70.38	71.20	71.20	
18	A	Simone Falloni	Italy	70.51	69.76	x	70.51	
19	A	Lukáš Melich	Czech Republic	69.45	66.38	70.50	70.50	
20	A	Nejc Pleško	Slovenia	66.66	70.44	x	70.44	
21	B	Ákos Hudi	Hungary	69.48	70.37	69.94	70.37	
22	B	Constantinos Stathelakos	Cyprus	70.20	x	68.36	70.20	
23	B	Tuomas Seppänen	Finland	69.76	69.48	x	69.76	
24	B	Oleksandr Drygol	Israel	x	68.10	64.69	68.10	NR
25	A	Nick Miller	Great Britain	67.76	x	x	67.76	
26	B	Serhiy Reheda	Ukraine	66.72	65.56	66.36	66.72	
	A	Eşref Apak	Turkey	x	x	x	NM	
	A	Libor Charfreitag	Slovakia	x	x	x	NM	

=== Final ===
Rank	Athlete	Nationality	#1	#2	#3	#4	#5	#6	Result	Notes
1st place, gold medalist(s)	Paweł Fajdek	Poland	80.46	78.85	79.09	80.37	80.93	79.69	80.93	
2nd place, silver medalist(s)	Ivan Tsikhan	Belarus	76.60	75.16	76.42	76.18	75.84	78.84	78.84	
3rd place, bronze medalist(s)	Wojciech Nowicki	Poland	74.52	77.31	77.53	x	77.43	76.02	77.53	
4	Mihaíl Anastasakis	Greece	75.89	x	x	x	x	x	75.89	
5	Marcel Lomnický	Slovakia	73.26	75.41	75.19	75.84	74.55	x	75.84	
6	Siarhei Kalamoyets	Belarus	69.11	73.97	x	74.65	x	67.88	74.65	
7	David Söderberg	Finland	74.22	73.83	72.98	x	72.01	73.86	74.22	
8	Serghei Marghiev	Moldova	71.40	70.90	72.66	66.42	73.21	x	73.21	
9	Özkan Baltaci	Turkey	68.96	71.35	69.36				71.35	
10	Chris Bennett	Great Britain	69.85	70.43	70.93				70.93	
11	Marco Lingua	Italy	70.00	x	x				70.00	
12	Javier Cienfuegos	Spain	68.17	x	x				68.17	
