= 2011 European Athletics U23 Championships – Men's hammer throw =

The Men's hammer throw event at the 2011 European Athletics U23 Championships was held in Ostrava, Czech Republic, at Městský stadion on 16 and 17 July.

== Medalists ==
Gold	Paweł Fajdek; Poland
Silver	Javier Cienfuegos; Spain
Bronze	Aleh Dubitski; Belarus

== Results ==
=== Final ===
17 July 2011 / 13:30

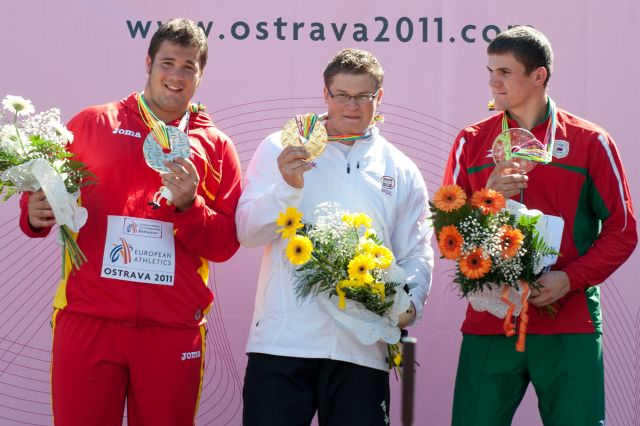
Medal winners (left to right): Javier Cienfuegos, Paweł Fajdek, Aleh Dubitski

Rank	Name	Nationality	Attempts						Result	Notes
Rank	Name	Nationality	1	2	3	4	5	6	Result	Notes
1st place, gold medalist(s)	Paweł Fajdek	Poland	72.66	76.74	78.54	77.21	77.52	77.54	78.54	PB
2nd place, silver medalist(s)	Javier Cienfuegos	Spain	70.34	70.91	72.08	x	x	73.03	73.03	
3rd place, bronze medalist(s)	Aleh Dubitski	Belarus	x	70.22	72.52	70.44	x	69.75	72.52	
4	Markus Johansson	Sweden	71.46	70.59	x	x	x	72.27	72.27	
5	Wojciech Nowicki	Poland	69.01	72.20	x	70.82	x	71.66	72.20	
6	Siarhei Kalamoyets	Belarus	71.48	71.79	71.84	x	x	x	71.84	
7	Andriy Martynyuk	Ukraine	71.47	71.10	69.67	69.55	69.10	x	71.47	
8	Ákos Hudi	Hungary	68.90	70.75	70.65	x	69.50	x	70.75	
9	Aleksey Kochnev	Russia	69.47	70.67	68.35				70.67	
10	Dániel Szabó	Hungary	70.26	70.62	69.33				70.62	
11	Norbert Rauhut	Poland	69.61	69.34	70.44				70.44	PB
12	Eivind Henriksen	Norway	69.89	x	x				69.89	

=== Qualifications ===
Qualified: qualifying perf. 72.00 (Q) or 12 best performers (q) to the advance to the Final

==== Summary ====
Rank	Name	Nationality	Result	Notes
1	Paweł Fajdek	Poland	74.33	Q
2	Siarhei Kalamoyets	Belarus	72.95	Q
3	Javier Cienfuegos	Spain	71.28	q
4	Ákos Hudi	Hungary	70.56	q
5	Aleksey Kochnev	Russia	70.56	q
6	Aleh Dubitski	Belarus	70.33	q
7	Dániel Szabó	Hungary	70.10	q
8	Markus Johansson	Sweden	70.09	q
9	Andriy Martynyuk	Ukraine	69.47	q
10	Norbert Rauhut	Poland	69.21	q
11	Eivind Henriksen	Norway	69.15	q
12	Wojciech Nowicki	Poland	68.04	q
13	Mirko Mičuda	Croatia	67.24	
14	Kai Räsänen	Finland	67.00	
15	Johannes Bichler	Germany	66.00	
16	Simone Falloni	Italy	65.43	
17	Pavel Bareisha	Belarus	65.41	
18	Michael Kolokotronis	Cyprus	64.39	
19	Tibor Petrovszki	Hungary	64.11	
20	Martin Lehemets	Estonia	62.61	
21	Alexandru Meheş	Romania	61.48	
22	Edgars Gailis	Latvia	59.25	
23	Jan Dvořák	Czech Republic	58.08	

==== Details ====
===== Group A =====
16 July 2011 / 10:00

Rank	Name	Nationality	Attempts			Result	Notes
Rank	Name	Nationality	1	2	3	Result	Notes
1	Paweł Fajdek	Poland	x	74.33		74.33	Q
2	Javier Cienfuegos	Spain	71.28	70.76	x	71.28	q
3	Ákos Hudi	Hungary	70.46	68.96	70.56	70.56	q
4	Markus Johansson	Sweden	68.66	68.66	70.09	70.09	q
5	Andriy Martynyuk	Ukraine	x	x	69.47	69.47	q
6	Mirko Mičuda	Croatia	67.06	x	67.24	67.24	
7	Kai Räsänen	Finland	x	67.00	66.75	67.00	
8	Simone Falloni	Italy	61.29	65.43	65.28	65.43	
9	Pavel Bareisha	Belarus	x	x	65.41	65.41	
10	Alexandru Meheş	Romania	61.00	x	61.48	61.48	
11	Edgars Gailis	Latvia	x	59.25	x	59.25	
12	Jan Dvořák	Czech Republic	57.56	58.08	57.53	58.08	

===== Group B =====
16 July 2011 / 11:10

Rank	Name	Nationality	Attempts			Result	Notes
Rank	Name	Nationality	1	2	3	Result	Notes
1	Siarhei Kalamoyets	Belarus	70.56	72.95		72.95	Q
2	Aleksey Kochnev	Russia	70.56	69.72	x	70.56	q
3	Aleh Dubitski	Belarus	63.65	x	70.33	70.33	q
4	Dániel Szabó	Hungary	68.95	70.10	69.34	70.10	q
5	Norbert Rauhut	Poland	66.30	69.21	x	69.21	q
6	Eivind Henriksen	Norway	67.37	66.77	69.15	69.15	q
7	Wojciech Nowicki	Poland	65.98	68.04	x	68.04	q
8	Johannes Bichler	Germany	66.00	65.93	x	66.00	
9	Michael Kolokotronis	Cyprus	61.76	64.39	63.87	64.39	
10	Tibor Petrovszki	Hungary	64.11	x	x	64.11	
11	Martin Lehemets	Estonia	60.72	60.08	62.61	62.61	

== Participation ==
According to an unofficial count, 23 athletes from 17 countries participated in the event.

- Belarus (3)
- Croatia (1)
- Cyprus (1)
- Czech Republic (1)
- Estonia (1)
- Finland (1)
- Germany (1)
- Hungary (3)
- Italy (1)
- Latvia (1)
- Norway (1)
- Poland (3)
- Romania (1)
- Russia (1)
- Spain (1)
- Sweden (1)
- Ukraine (1)
