= 2018 European Athletics Championships – Men's hammer throw =

Men's hammer throw at the 2018 European Athletics Championships
- Venue: Olympic Stadium
- Location: Berlin
- Dates: August 6 (qualification); August 7 (final)
- Competitors: 30 from 18 nations
- Winning distance: 80.12

Medalists
gold medal	Wojciech Nowicki	Poland
silver medal	Paweł Fajdek	Poland
bronze medal	Bence Halász	Hungary

The men's hammer throw at the 2018 European Athletics Championships took place at the Olympic Stadium on 6 and 7 August.

== Records ==
Standing records prior to the 2018 European Athletics Championships
World record	Yuriy Sedykh (URS)	86.74 m	Stuttgart, West Germany	30 August 1986
European record	Yuriy Sedykh (URS)	86.74 m	Stuttgart, West Germany	30 August 1986
Championship record	Yuriy Sedykh (URS)	86.74 m	Stuttgart, West Germany	30 August 1986
World Leading	Wojciech Nowicki (POL)	81.85 m	Székesfehérvár, Hungary	2 July 2018
Europe Leading	Wojciech Nowicki (POL)	81.85 m	Székesfehérvár, Hungary	2 July 2018

== Schedule ==
Date	Time	Round
6 August 2018	16:05	Qualification
7 August 2018	18:45	Final

All times are local times (UTC+2)

== Results ==
=== Qualification ===
Qualification: 76.00 m (Q) or best 12 performers (q)

Rank	Group	Name	Nationality	#1	#2	#3	Result	Note
1	B	Paweł Fajdek	Poland	74.61	77.86		77.86	Q
2	A	Bence Halász	Hungary	76.81			76.81	Q
3	B	Pavel Bareisha	Belarus	74.34	76.47		76.47	Q
4	A	Wojciech Nowicki	Poland	76.03			76.03	Q
5	A	Mihail Anastasakis	Greece	73.72	75.61	72.87	75.61	q
6	B	Eivind Henriksen	Norway	74.54	74.36	75.14	75.14	q
7	A	Serghei Marghiev	Moldova	75.10	73.51	74.31	75.10	q
8	B	Marcel Lomnický	Slovakia	72.26	x	75.08	75.08	q
9	A	Ivan Tsikhan	Belarus	72.53	74.67	74.31	74.67	q
10	B	Hlib Piskunov	Ukraine	72.40	x	74.18	74.18	q
11	B	Nick Miller	Great Britain	73.79	x	–	73.79	q
12	A	Denis Lukyanov	Authorised Neutral Athletes	72.06	73.35	73.19	73.19	q
13	A	Marco Lingua	Italy	x	x	73.07	73.07	
14	B	Aleksey Sokirskiy	Authorised Neutral Athletes	72.97	70.97	71.85	72.97	
15	A	Javier Cienfuegos	Spain	72.76	71.27	71.94	72.76	
16	A	Quentin Bigot	France	72.73	72.12	72.33	72.73	
17	B	Eşref Apak	Turkey	72.70	x	71.88	72.70	
18	A	Hleb Dudarau	Belarus	x	71.41	72.19	72.19	
19	A	Özkan Baltacı	Turkey	71.55	71.35	x	71.55	
20	A	Henri Liipola	Finland	70.86	71.34	68.75	71.34	
21	B	Simone Falloni	Italy	70.77	71.03	69.58	71.03	
22	B	Denzel Comenentia	Netherlands	x	66.10	70.70	70.70	
23	B	Volodymyr Myslyvchuk	Ukraine	69.57	x	70.59	70.59	
24	A	Chris Bennett	Great Britain	70.57	70.34	x	70.57	
25	A	Serhiy Reheda	Ukraine	67.81	70.39	x	70.39	
26	B	Bence Pásztor	Hungary	69.02	69.66	68.85	69.66	
27	A	Anders Eriksson	Sweden	x	69.19	x	69.19	
28	B	David Söderberg	Finland	69.18	68.15	67.21	69.18	
29	B	Nejc Pleško	Slovenia	x	68.29	x	68.29	
30	B	Pedro José Martín	Spain	x	x	67.56	67.56	

=== Final ===
Rank	Athlete	Nationality	#1	#2	#3	#4	#5	#6	Result	Notes
1st place, gold medalist(s)	Wojciech Nowicki	Poland	77.19	80.00	80.12	79.00	x	78.81	80.12	
2nd place, silver medalist(s)	Paweł Fajdek	Poland	78.69	x	x	x	78.34	76.02	78.69	
3rd place, bronze medalist(s)	Bence Halász	Hungary	77.15	x	x	x	77.36	x	77.36	
4	Pavel Bareisha	Belarus	x	75.20	x	75.02	75.47	77.02	77.02	
5	Eivind Henriksen	Norway	76.05	76.71	76.86	74.58	75.89	x	76.86	NR
6	Ivan Tsikhan	Belarus	73.85	x	74.05	75.12	75.79	75.23	75.79	SB
7	Hlib Piskunov	Ukraine	73.99	73.68	72.80	73.41	74.62	72.68	74.62	
8	Serghei Marghiev	Moldova	72.72	74.47	73.76	x	73.06	x	74.47	
9	Mihail Anastasakis	Greece	73.33	x	72.35				73.33	
10	Nick Miller	Great Britain	73.16	x	x				73.16	
11	Marcel Lomnický	Slovakia	x	x	72.74				72.74	
12	Denis Lukyanov	Authorised Neutral Athletes	x	69.64	71.71				71.71	
