= 2013 European Athletics U23 Championships – Men's hammer throw =

The Men's hammer throw event at the 2013 European Athletics U23 Championships was held in Tampere, Finland, at Ratina Stadium on 11 and 13 July.

== Medalists ==
Gold	Zakhar Makhrosenka; Belarus
Silver	Ákos Hudi; Hungary
Bronze	Quentin Bigot; France

== Results ==
=== Final ===
13 July 2013

Rank	Name	Nationality	Attempts						Result	Notes
Rank	Name	Nationality	1	2	3	4	5	6	Result	Notes
1st place, gold medalist(s)	Zakhar Makhrosenka	Belarus	x	66.06	69.29	74.23	74.63	x	74.63	
2nd place, silver medalist(s)	Ákos Hudi	Hungary	71.49	73.42	71.69	71.57	74.06	74.09	74.09	
3rd place, bronze medalist(s)	Quentin Bigot	France	68.65	x	74.00	71.83	73.71	70.56	74.00	
4	Simone Falloni	Italy	71.36	67.27	71.78	70.15	72.43	67.99	72.43	PB
5	Serghei Marghiev	Moldova	71.29	72.08	69.75	71.07	71.87	71.87	72.08	
6	Conor McCullough	Ireland	69.67	x	71.49	71.41	67.59	70.27	71.49	SB
7	Yevgeniy Korotovskiy	Russia	4.68	x	69.40	68.03	x	68.66	69.40	
8	Alexandros Poursanidis	Cyprus	60.86	65.95	67.92	67.00	63.45	64.22	67.92	NUR
9	Nick Miller	United Kingdom	61.82	64.64	66.64				66.64	
10	Arkadiusz Rogowski	Poland	63.77	x	66.12				66.12	
11	Balázs Töreky	Hungary	63.90	59.86	65.70				65.70	
12	Tomáš Kružliak	Slovakia	64.29	x	64.02				64.29	

=== Qualifications ===
Qualified: qualifying perf. 71.00 (Q) or 12 best performers (q) advance to the Final

==== Summary ====
Rank	Name	Nationality	Result	Notes
1	Quentin Bigot	France	73.06	Q
2	Zakhar Makhrosenka	Belarus	71.75	Q
3	Serghei Marghiev	Moldova	71.67	Q
4	Ákos Hudi	Hungary	70.40	q
5	Simone Falloni	Italy	70.17	q
6	Conor McCullough	Ireland	69.40	q SB
7	Nick Miller	United Kingdom	67.41	q
8	Arkadiusz Rogowski	Poland	67.36	q
9	Balázs Töreky	Hungary	66.66	q PB
10	Tomáš Kružliak	Slovakia	66.60	q
11	Yevgeniy Korotovskiy	Russia	66.39	q
12	Alexandros Poursanidis	Cyprus	66.32	q
13	Pedro José Martín	Spain	66.04	
14	Ilmari Lahtinen	Finland	66.00	
15	Igor Buryi	Russia	64.70	
16	Paul Hützen	Germany	64.51	
17	Martin Lehemets	Estonia	64.16	
18	Gergely Nagy	Hungary	64.13	
19	Pablo Denis	Spain	63.63	
20	Juho Saarikoski	Finland	62.94	
21	Tomas Juknevičius	Lithuania	62.41	
22	Jesse Lehto	Finland	62.30	
23	Aykhan Apti	Bulgaria	61.84	
24	Gianlorenzo Ferretti	Italy	59.84	
25	Edgars Gailis	Latvia	57.54	
	Nejc Pleško	Slovenia	NM	

==== Details ====
===== Group A =====
11 July 2013 / 10:00

Rank	Name	Nationality	Attempts			Result	Notes
Rank	Name	Nationality	1	2	3	Result	Notes
1	Zakhar Makhrosenka	Belarus	61.15	68.67	71.75	71.75	Q
2	Serghei Marghiev	Moldova	68.53	69.34	71.67	71.67	Q
3	Conor McCullough	Ireland	68.70	68.74	69.40	69.40	q SB
4	Arkadiusz Rogowski	Poland	65.93	x	67.36	67.36	q
5	Tomáš Kružliak	Slovakia	66.04	x	66.60	66.60	q
6	Yevgeniy Korotovskiy	Russia	66.39	x	66.10	66.39	q
7	Pedro José Martín	Spain	64.81	66.04	x	66.04	
8	Ilmari Lahtinen	Finland	x	63.74	66.00	66.00	
9	Gergely Nagy	Hungary	63.31	64.13	x	64.13	
10	Tomas Juknevičius	Lithuania	56.68	61.07	62.41	62.41	
11	Aykhan Apti	Bulgaria	61.36	61.84	61.72	61.84	
12	Gianlorenzo Ferretti	Italy	57.23	57.54	59.84	59.84	
13	Edgars Gailis	Latvia	57.54	x	56.61	57.54	

===== Group B =====
11 July 2013 / 11:20

Rank	Name	Nationality	Attempts			Result	Notes
Rank	Name	Nationality	1	2	3	Result	Notes
1	Quentin Bigot	France	70.41	73.06		73.06	Q
2	Ákos Hudi	Hungary	69.87	70.40	-	70.40	q
3	Simone Falloni	Italy	69.53	70.17	-	70.17	q
4	Nick Miller	United Kingdom	62.49	67.41	x	67.41	q
5	Balázs Töreky	Hungary	65.22	65.57	66.66	66.66	q PB
6	Alexandros Poursanidis	Cyprus	x	66.32	64.48	66.32	q
7	Igor Buryi	Russia	x	64.70	61.66	64.70	
8	Paul Hützen	Germany	x	64.51	64.44	64.51	
9	Martin Lehemets	Estonia	64.16	x	x	64.16	
10	Pablo Denis	Spain	59.27	x	63.63	63.63	
11	Juho Saarikoski	Finland	x	62.94	x	62.94	
12	Jesse Lehto	Finland	60.26	x	62.30	62.30	
	Nejc Pleško	Slovenia	x	x	x	NM	

== Participation ==
According to an unofficial count, 26 athletes from 19 countries participated in the event.

- Belarus (1)
- Bulgaria (1)
- Cyprus (1)
- Estonia (1)
- Finland (3)
- France (1)
- Germany (1)
- Hungary (3)
- Ireland (1)
- Italy (2)
- Latvia (1)
- Lithuania (1)
- Moldova (1)
- Poland (1)
- Russia (2)
- Slovakia (1)
- Slovenia (1)
- Spain (2)
- United Kingdom (1)
