= Yury Vasilchanka =

Belarusian hammer thrower

Personal information
- Nationality: Belarusian
- Born: 1 April 1994 (age 32)

Sport
- Sport: Athletics
- Event: Hammer throw

Yury Vasilchanka (Belarusian: Юрый Васільчанка; born 1 April 1994) is a Belarusian hammer thrower.

== Career ==
He competed at the 2012 World Junior Championships in Athletics in Barcelona, in the men's 6kg hammer throw, without proceeding to the final. He was a silver medalist at the 2015 European Cup Winter Throwing in the men's U23 hammer throw competition in Leiria, Portugal. He competed at the 2015 European Athletics U23 Championships in Tallinn, Estonia, qualifying for the final, however his results men's hammer throw for this time period were later annulled.

Vasilchanka threw 76.32 metres to win at a competition in Minsk in May 2021. He became Belarusian national hammer throwing champion for the first time with a victory in Minsk at the Belarus Athletics Championships in June 2021, with a throw of 72.82 metres. Whilst competing in the hammer throw at the delayed 2020 Summer Olympics in Beijing in August 2021, Vasilchanka threw 74.00m to finish seventh in qualifying heat B. In September 2021, he threw 73.14 metres to finish in fifth place at the Kip Keino Classic in Nairobi, Kenya.

He threw a distance of 73.62 metres to win the hammer throw at the Belarusian Athletics Championships in June 2024, to become Belarusian national champion for a second time.

He finished runner-up to Siarhei Kalamoyets at the Belarus Winter Throwing Championships in Brest, Belarus in March 2025, with a throw of 70.65 metres.

== Doping ==
Vasilchanka received a four-year doping ban from May 2015 following a positive drug test for a banned substance whilst in competition in Germany.
