= Conor McCullough (hammer thrower, born 1961) =

Irish hammer thrower

Personal information
- Nationality: Irish
- Born: 22 March 1961 (age 65) Ireland
- Height: 192 cm (6 ft 4 in)
- Weight: 111 kg (245 lb)

Sport
- Sport: Athletics
- Event: Hammer throw

Connor McCullough (born 22 March 1961) is an Irish athlete. He competed in the men's hammer throw at the 1984 Summer Olympics and the 1988 Summer Olympics.

His son, Conor McCullough was the 2010 World Junior Champion in the hammer throw, competing for the United States.

== Biography ==
McCullough was educated at Multyfarnham Agricultural College in Multyfarnham before studying in the United States at Kent State University and Boston University.

In 1987, while working as a bouncer he was stabbed at a nightclub in Santa Monica, California. He recovered from his injuries in time to be selected by the Irish Olympic team for the 1988 Seoul Olympics.

He was a three Irish hammer champion (1988, 1990-91) and finished third behind Sean Carlin in the hammer throw event at the British 1991 AAA Championships.
