= 2015 World Championships in Athletics – Men's hammer throw =

Men's hammer throw at the 2015 World Championships
- Venue: Beijing National Stadium
- Dates: 22 August (qualification); 23 August (final)
- Competitors: 30 from 21 nations
- Winning distance: 80.88

Medalists
gold medal	Paweł Fajdek	Poland
silver medal	Dilshod Nazarov	Tajikistan
bronze medal	Wojciech Nowicki	Poland

The men's hammer throw at the 2015 World Championships in Athletics was held at the Beijing National Stadium on 22 and 23 August.

Returning champion and current world leader Paweł Fajdek looked to be the favorite. In the first round it was David Söderberg who took the lead. The second round saw Dilshod Nazarov and Sergej Litvinov get off 77 metre throws to take the top two spots. Then in the third round, Fajdek let out 80.64 and calmly walked out of the ring. Nobody else could get in that range, but Fajdek launched 80.88 on his next throw for the win. Nazarov got off a 78.55 in the fifth round to move into second, but that was matched exactly by Wojciech Nowicki on his final throw. With an exact tie for the silver medal, the second best throw became the tiebreaker, Nazarov's 78.06 in the fourth round being superior to Nowicki's third round 77.20.

The world championships also incorporated the 2015 IAAF Hammer Throw Challenge and Fajdek was the series winner.

== Records ==
Prior to the competition, the records were as follows:

World record	Yuriy Sedykh (URS)	86.74	Stuttgart, West Germany	30 August 1986
Championship record	Ivan Tsikhan (BLR)	83.63	Osaka, Japan	27 August 2007
World leading	Paweł Fajdek (POL)	83.93	Szczecin, Poland	9 August 2015
African record	Mostafa Al-Gamel (EGY)	81.27	Cairo, Egypt	21 March 2014
Asian record	Koji Murofushi (JPN)	84.86	Prague, Czech Republic	29 June 2003
North, Central American and Caribbean record	Lance Deal (USA)	82.52	Milan, Italy	7 September 1996
South American record	Juan Ignacio Cerra (ARG)	76.42	Trieste, Italy	25 July 2001
European record	Yuriy Sedykh (URS)	86.74	Stuttgart, West Germany	30 August 1986
Oceanian record	Stuart Rendell (AUS)	79.29	Varaždin, Croatia	6 July 2002

== Qualification standards ==
Entry standards
76.00

== Schedule ==
Date	Time	Round
22 August 2015	09:30	Qualification
23 August 2015	18:30	Final

All times are local times (UTC+8)

== Results ==
KEY:	Q	Qualified	q	12 best performers	NR	National record	PB	Personal best	SB	Seasonal best

=== Qualification ===
Qualification: Qualifying Performance 77.00 (Q) or at least 12 best performers (q) advanced to the final.

Rank	Group	Name	Nationality	#1	#2	#3	Mark	Notes
1	A	Paweł Fajdek	Poland	76.46	78.38		78.38	Q
2	A	Nick Miller	Great Britain & N.I.	77.42			77.42	Q
3	B	Sergej Litvinov	Russia	74.75	76.79	–	76.79	q
4	B	Wojciech Nowicki	Poland	75.52	x	76.72	76.72	q
5	B	Ashraf Amgad Elseify	Qatar	72.01	75.03	76.51	76.51	q
6	A	David Söderberg	Finland	73.30	75.96	75.42	75.96	q
7	A	Dilshod Nazarov	Tajikistan	74.86	75.56	–	75.56	q
8	B	Mostafa Al-Gamel	Egypt	75.48	x	74.06	75.48	q
9	B	Krisztián Pars	Hungary	75.37	74.41	75.02	75.37	q
10	B	Roberto Janet	Cuba	x	74.77	75.28	75.28	q
11	B	Tuomas Seppänen	Finland	74.74	x	73.43	74.74	q, SB
12	A	Marcel Lomnický	Slovakia	73.10	x	74.51	74.51	q
13	B	Conor McCullough	United States	72.40	72.05	74.31	74.31	
14	A	Yevhen Vynohradov	Ukraine	71.01	x	74.09	74.09	
15	B	Mark Dry	Great Britain & N.I.	72.13	71.24	73.87	73.87	
16	A	Kibwe Johnson	United States	71.72	73.75	73.33	73.75	
17	B	Eşref Apak	Turkey	73.01	x	x	73.01	
18	A	Yury Shayunou	Belarus	x	72.07	72.87	72.87	
19	A	Marco Lingua	Italy	72.01	x	72.85	72.85	
20	A	Lukáš Melich	Czech Republic	71.89	70.11	72.12	72.12	
21	B	Ivan Tsikhan	Belarus	70.30	71.88	x	71.88	
22	A	Wagner Domingos	Brazil	71.35	71.82	x	71.82	
23	B	Serghei Marghiev	Moldova	x	71.61	71.45	71.61	
24	A	A. G. Kruger	United States	x	71.56	x	71.56	
25	A	Pavel Bareisha	Belarus	x	71.41	71.23	71.41	
26	A	Suhrob Khodjaev	Uzbekistan	70.45	70.99	71.24	71.24	
27	B	Ákos Hudi	Hungary	71.15	x	x	71.15	
28	A	Bence Pásztor	Hungary	71.10	70.68	71.14	71.14	
29	B	Javier Cienfuegos	Spain	69.38	68.37	70.96	70.96	
30	B	Roberto Sawyers	Costa Rica	x	65.53	66.64	66.64	

=== Final ===
The final was started at 18:30.

Rank	Name	Nationality	# 1	# 2	# 3	# 4	# 5	# 6	Mark	Notes
1st place, gold medalist(s)	Paweł Fajdek	Poland	76.40	x	80.64	80.88	79.34	78.29	80.88	
2nd place, silver medalist(s)	Dilshod Nazarov	Tajikistan	76.83	77.61	76.17	78.06	78.55	76.60	78.55	
3rd place, bronze medalist(s)	Wojciech Nowicki	Poland	76.14	76.73	77.20	x	75.80	78.55	78.55	
4	Krisztián Pars	Hungary	76.33	75.98	77.32	x	76.40	77.05	77.32	
5	Sergej Litvinov	Russia	70.75	77.09	~~77.24~~ DQ	x	77.04	x	77.24 (DQ)	
6	David Söderberg	Finland	76.92	74.75	75.70	75.48	75.32	75.19	76.92	SB
7	Mostafa Al-Gamel	Egypt	74.70	76.25	76.81	x	x	75.77	76.81	
8	Marcel Lomnický	Slovakia	73.71	74.36	75.62	75.79	75.72	74.82	75.79	
9	Ashraf Amgad Elseify	Qatar	x	72.90	74.09				74.09	
10	Tuomas Seppänen	Finland	x	71.85	73.18				73.18	
11	Nick Miller	Great Britain & N.I.	x	x	72.94				72.94	
12	Roberto Janet	Cuba	x	72.50	71.79				72.50	
