= Wojciech Nowicki =

Polish hammer thrower (born 1989)

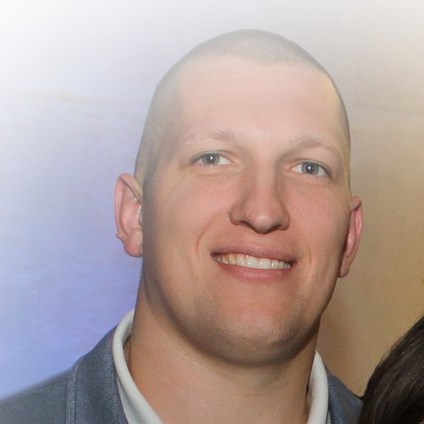
- Nowicki in 2016

Personal information
- Born: 22 February 1989 (age 37) Białystok, Poland
- Height: 1.96 m (6 ft 5 in)
- Weight: 128 kg (282 lb)

Sport
- Country: Poland
- Sport: Athletics
- Event: Hammer throw
- Club: Podlasie Białystok (2008–)
- Coached by: Malwina Sobierajska-Wojtulewicz (2016–2021), Joanna Fiodorow (2021–)
Medal record
Men's athletics
Representing Poland
Event	1st	2nd	3rd
Olympic Games	1	0	1
World Championships	0	2	3
European Championships	3	0	1
Total	4	2	5
Olympic Games
Gold medal – first place	2020 Tokyo	Hammer throw
Bronze medal – third place	2016 Rio de Janeiro	Hammer throw
World Championships
Silver medal – second place	2022 Eugene	Hammer throw
Silver medal – second place	2023 Budapest	Hammer throw
Bronze medal – third place	2015 Beijing	Hammer throw
Bronze medal – third place	2017 London	Hammer throw
Bronze medal – third place	2019 Doha	Hammer throw
European Championships
Gold medal – first place	2018 Berlin	Hammer throw
Gold medal – first place	2022 Munich	Hammer throw
Gold medal – first place	2024 Rome	Hammer throw
Bronze medal – third place	2016 Amsterdam	Hammer throw
European Games
Gold medal – first place	2023 Kraków–Małopolska	Hammer throw
European Team Championships
Gold medal – first place	2019 Bydgoszcz	Hammer throw
Military World Games
Gold medal – first place	2019 Wuhan	Hammer throw

Wojciech Nowicki (Polish pronunciation: [ˈvɔjt͡ɕɛx nɔˈvit͡skʲi]; born 22 February 1989) is a Polish hammer thrower. He won the gold medal at the 2020 Summer Olympics, silver medals at the 2022 and 2023 World Championships and bronze medals at the 2016 Summer Olympics, 2015, 2017 and 2019 World Championships. His personal best in the event is 82.52 metres set in 2021 at the Olympic Games in Tokyo.

== Career ==
Nowicki achieved his personal best, 78.71 metres, on 3 May 2015. In August of the same year, he won the bronze medal in the hammer throw event at the 2015 World Championships in Athletics in Beijing, China. He placed third again at the two subsequent World Championships (London 2017 and Doha 2019).

In July 2016, Nowicki took bronze at the European Athletics Championships in Amsterdam, Netherlands. In August, he was awarded the bronze medal in the hammer throw at the 2016 Summer Olympics in Rio de Janeiro, Brazil. At the 2020 Summer Olympics, Nowicki won the qualification with a throw of 79.78 m. In the third attempt of the finals, he managed to improve his personal best from 81.72 m to 82.52 m which secured him the gold medal, while Eivind Henriksen took silver and his fellow countryman Paweł Fajdek placed third.

== Competition record ==
Year	Competition	Venue	Position	Event	Notes
Representing Poland
2011	European U23 Championships	Ostrava, Czech Republic	5th	Hammer throw	72.20 m
2013	Universiade	Kazan, Russia	5th	Hammer throw	75.32 m
2015	World Championships	Beijing, China	3rd	Hammer throw	78.55 m
2016	European Championships	Amsterdam, Netherlands	3rd	Hammer throw	77.53 m
2016	Olympic Games	Rio de Janeiro, Brazil	3rd	Hammer throw	77.73 m
2017	World Championships	London, United Kingdom	3rd	Hammer throw	78.03 m
2018	Athletics World Cup	London, United Kingdom	1st	Hammer throw	77.94 m
2018	European Championships	Berlin, Germany	1st	Hammer throw	80.12 m
2019	World Championships	Doha, Qatar	3rd	Hammer throw	77.69 m
2019	Military World Games	Wuhan, China	1st	Hammer throw	77.38 m
2021	Olympic Games	Tokyo, Japan	1st	Hammer throw	82.52 m PB
2022	World Championships	Eugene, United States	2nd	Hammer throw	81.03 m
2022	European Championships	Munich, Germany	1st	Hammer throw	82.00 m
2023	World Championships	Budapest, Hungary	2nd	Hammer throw	81.02 m
2024	European Championships	Rome, Italy	1st	Hammer throw	80.95 m
2024	Olympic Games	Paris, France	7th	Hammer throw	77.42 m
2026	European Championships	Birmingham, United Kingdom	13th (q)	Hammer throw	74.49 m

== Personal life ==
Nowicki and his wife Anna have two daughters – Amelia and Izabela. He studied mechanical engineering at the Bialystok University of Technology.
