= Athletics at the 2017 Summer Universiade – Men's hammer throw =

The men's hammer throw event at the 2017 Summer Universiade was held on 23 and 24 August at the Taipei Municipal Stadium.

== Medalists ==
Gold	Silver	Bronze
Paweł Fajdek; Poland	Pavel Bareisha; Belarus	Serghei Marghiev; Moldova

== Results ==
=== Qualification ===
Qualification: 60.00 m (Q) or at least 12 best (q) qualified for the final.

Rank	Group	Athlete	Nationality	#1	#2	#3	Result	Notes
1	A	Serghei Marghiev	Moldova	72.59			72.59	Q
2	A	Bence Halász	Hungary	71.29			71.29	Q
3	A	Diego del Real	Mexico	70.50			70.50	Q
4	B	Özkan Baltacı	Turkey	70.43			70.43	Q
5	B	Pavel Bareisha	Belarus	70.29			70.29	Q
6	A	Serhii Reheda	Ukraine	68.25			68.25	Q
7	B	Paweł Fajdek	Poland	67.97			67.97	Q
8	B	Simone Falloni	Italy	67.47			67.47	Q
9	B	Tomáš Kružliak	Slovakia	66.44			66.44	Q
10	A	Tshepang Makhethe	South Africa	66.39			66.39	Q
11	A	Alexandros Poursanidis	Cyprus	x	65.45		65.45	Q
12	B	Alexei Mikhailov	Germany	64.11			64.11	Q
13	A	Joaquín Gómez	Argentina	63.33			63.33	Q
14	A	Kunihiro Sumi	Japan	62.01			62.01	Q
15	B	Wu Jhou-wei	Chinese Taipei	56.46	58.28	61.59	61.59	Q
16	A	Daniel Aguirre	Colombia	x	61.32		61.32	Q
17	B	Renaldo Frechou	South Africa	60.84			60.84	Q
18	A	Taj Murmann	Denmark	x	57.96	x	57.96	
19	B	Singh Taranveer	India	54.03	x	x	54.03	
20	B	Abdurauf Musoev	Tajikistan	53.01	51.56	53.38	53.38	

=== Final ===
Rank	Name	Nationality	#1	#2	#3	#4	#5	#6	Result	Notes
1st place, gold medalist(s)	Paweł Fajdek	Poland	x	72.57	79.16	77.34	x	x	79.16	
2nd place, silver medalist(s)	Pavel Bareisha	Belarus	68.89	x	71.75	x	77.98	73.59	77.98	
3rd place, bronze medalist(s)	Serghei Marghiev	Moldova	74.64	74.98	73.61	x	x	73.78	74.98	
4	Bence Halász	Hungary	70.76	70.40	73.79	x	x	73.73	73.79	
5	Özkan Baltacı	Turkey	72.65	71.95	73.58	72.85	x	x	73.58	
6	Simone Falloni	Italy	71.75	70.74	72.18	x	73.24	70.83	73.24	
7	Serhii Reheda	Ukraine	70.34	x	x	x	69.16	x	70.34	
8	Tshepang Makhethe	South Africa	67.59	69.62	x	69.77	69.39	68.00	69.77	
9	Joaquín Gómez	Argentina	x	66.17	69.49				69.49	
10	Alexei Mikhailov	Germany	69.07	x	x				69.07	
11	Tomáš Kružliak	Slovakia	66.60	66.19	65.84				66.60	
12	Renaldo Frechou	South Africa	x	64.14	58.14				64.14	
13	Kunihiro Sumi	Japan	64.00	x	62.25				64.00	
14	Daniel Aguirre	Colombia	x	59.96	x				59.96	
15	Wu Jhou-wei	Chinese Taipei	59.51	57.78	x				59.51	
	Diego del Real	Mexico	x	x	x				NM	
	Alexandros Poursanidis	Cyprus	x	x	x				NM	
