= 2010 World Junior Championships in Athletics – Men's hammer throw =

The men's hammer throw at the 2010 World Junior Championships in Athletics was held at the Moncton 2010 Stadium on 23 & 25 July. The final was won by American Conor McCullough. A six-kilogram ball was used throughout the competition.

== Medalists ==
Gold	Silver	Bronze
Conor McCullough; United States	Ákos Hudi; Hungary	Alaa El-Din El-Ashry; Egypt

== Records ==
Prior to the competition, the existing world junior and championship records were as follows.

	Name	Nationality	Distance	Location	Date
World junior record	Javier Cienfuegos	Spain	82.97	Madrid	June 17, 2009
Championship record	Yevgeniy Aydamirov	Russia	78.42	Beijing	August 28, 2006

The following records were established during the competition:

Date	Round	Name	Nationality	Distance	WJR	CR
July 25	Final	Conor McCullough	United States	80.79		CR

== Results ==
=== Final ===
25 July

Rank	Athlete	Nationality	1	2	3	4	5	6	Result	Notes
1st place, gold medalist(s)	Conor McCullough	United States	77.59	80.79	80.18	78.05	80.69	x	80.79	(CR), (NJR)
2nd place, silver medalist(s)	Ákos Hudi	Hungary	78.37	x	74.15	77.28	76.56	75.33	78.37	
3rd place, bronze medalist(s)	Alaa El-Din El-Ashry	Egypt	76.38	76.66	74.70	75.23	76.54	76.05	76.66	(PB)
4	Bartłomiej Krupa	Poland	74.43	68.56	x	69.05	72.36	x	74.43	(PB)
5	Dániel Szabó	Hungary	x	71.16	74.41	x	70.85	x	74.41	
6	Pavel Bareisha	Belarus	72.41	x	x	73.23	x	71.99	73.23	(PB)
7	Quentin Bigot	France	70.22	68.45	69.40	70.18	69.02	71.51	71.51	
8	Paul Hützen	Germany	x	67.03	67.22	64.07	x	x	67.22	
9	Marcin Pastuszko	Poland	x	67.22	x				67.22	
10	Justin Welch	United States	67.20	x	x				67.20	
11	Edgards Gailis	Latvia	67.02	66.46	x				67.02	
12	Tomáš Kružliak	Slovakia	66.02	x	66.54				66.54	

Key: CR = Championship record, NJR = National junior record, PB = Personal best

=== Qualifications ===
23 July

==== Group A ====
Rank	Name	Nationality	Attempts			Result	Notes
Rank	Name	Nationality	1	2	3	Result	Notes
1	Conor McCullough	United States	76.05	-	-	76.05	Q
2	Bartłomiej Krupa	Poland	x	71.55	-	71.55	Q
3	Dániel Szabó	Hungary	60.24	x	x	70.89	q
4	Edgars Gailis	Latvia	68.13	x	67.34	68.13	q
5	Tomáš Kružliak	Slovakia	x	64.54	67.50	67.50	q
6	Harinder Singh	India	63.82	66.57	65.51	66.57	
7	Serghei Marghiev	Moldova	63.78	x	66.56	66.56	
8	Tristan Schwandke	Germany	x	x	66.12	66.12	
9	Servando Rivas	Spain	62.36	65.71	64.42	65.71	
10	Pedro Martín	Spain	65.54	65.38	61.80	65.54	
11	Mikko Koskiranta	Finland	60.80	63.71	64.99	64.99	
12	Zdravko Dimitrov	Bulgaria	x	63.98	64.75	64.75	
13	Simone Falloni	Italy	64.49	63.35	60.24	64.49	
14	Abdulhamed Mohammad	Kuwait	62.98	x	64.36	64.36	
15	Elias Håkansson	Sweden	-	62.72	x	62.72	
16	Cheng Tzu-Chi	Chinese Taipei	60.49	60.18	x	60.49	
17	Enrique Gaitán	Guatemala	x	x	54.12	54.12	

==== Group B ====
Rank	Name	Nationality	Attempts			Result	Notes
Rank	Name	Nationality	1	2	3	Result	Notes
1	Ákos Hudi	Hungary	76.62	-	-	76.62	Q
2	Alaa El-Din El-Ashry	Egypt	73.23	-	-	73.23	Q
3	Pavel Bareisha	Belarus	68.33	72.35	-	72.35	Q
4	Quentin Bigot	France	69.01	69.25	70.41	70.41	q
5	Marcin Pastuszko	Poland	x	68.52	67.29	68.52	q
6	Justin Welch	United States	67.46	x	x	67.46	q
7	Paul Hützen	Germany	66.82	x	63.97	66.82	q
8	Joelvis Hernández	Cuba	x	x	66.32	66.32	
9	Alexandru Mehes	Romania	62.06	62.03	65.35	65.35	
10	Juho Saarikoski	Finland	63.76	x	63.10	63.76	
11	Özkan Baltaci	Turkey	x	61.95	x	61.95	
12	Anastas Papazov	Bulgaria	61.52	58.65	x	61.52	
13	Demetris Elia	Cyprus	70.17	70.89	69.95	60.24	
14	Ryota Kashimura	Japan	x	x	58.91	58.91	
15	Kevin Bowman	Canada	x	x	54.51	54.51	
	Martin Lehemets	Estonia	x	x	x	NM	
	Pezhman Ghalehnoei	Iran	x	x	x	NM	

== Participation ==
According to an unofficial count, 34 athletes from 27 countries participated in the event.

- Belarus (1)
- Bulgaria (2)
- Canada (1)
- Chinese Taipei (1)
- Cuba (1)
- Cyprus (1)
- Egypt (1)
- Estonia (1)
- Finland (2)
- France (1)
- Germany (2)
- Guatemala (1)
- Hungary (2)
- India (1)
- Iran (1)
- Italy (1)
- Japan (1)
- Kuwait (1)
- Latvia (1)
- Moldova (1)
- Poland (2)
- Romania (1)
- Slovakia (1)
- Spain (2)
- Sweden (1)
- Turkey (1)
- United States (2)
