= 2017 World Championships in Athletics – Men's hammer throw =

Men's hammer throw at the 2017 World Championships
- Venue: Olympic Stadium
- Dates: 9 August (qualification); 11 August (final)
- Competitors: 32 from 20 nations
- Winning distance: 79.73 m (261 ft 6 3/4 in)

Medalists
gold medal	Paweł Fajdek	Poland
silver medal	Valeriy Pronkin	Authorised Neutral Athletes
bronze medal	Wojciech Nowicki	Poland

Video on YouTube Official Video

The men's hammer throw at the 2017 World Championships in Athletics is being held at the Olympic Stadium on 9 and 11 August.

== Summary ==
The final started with Aleksei Sokirskiy (ANA)'s 76.22 m early leader. Wojciech Nowicki (POL) slightly improved upon that to 77.36 m but the next thrower Quentin Bigot (FRA) hit the first round leader 77.05 m on the next throw. Near the end of the round, Valeriy Pronkin (ANA) moved into second place with his 77.00 m. In the second round, Sokirskiy improved to 77.50 m, while Olympic champion Dilshod Nazarov (TJK) moved into second with his best of the day 77.22m. In the third round, Nick Miller (GBR) put himself into bronze medal position with his 77.31 m best, but two throws later Nowicki threw his best of 78.03 m to take the lead followed by Bigot improving to 77.46 m. Near the end of the round, 2017 #1 Paweł Fajdek (POL) took a big lead with a 79.73 m. In the fourth round, Bigot again improved, 77.67 m enough to move into bronze position. At the end of the round, Fajdek threw his best of the day 79.81 m (261 ft 10 in). Two throws later, in the fifth round, Pronkin's 77.98 m leapfrogged him from seventh place to silver. He then improved upon that with a 78.16 m in the final round. It was the third silver medal for Authorised Neutral Athletes.

== Records ==
Before the competition records were as follows:

Record	Perf.	Athlete	Nat.	Date	Location
World	86.74	Yuriy Sedykh	URS	30 Aug 1986	Stuttgart, West Germany
Championship	83.63	Ivan Tsikhan	BLR	27 Aug 2007	Osaka, Japan
World leading	83.44	Paweł Fajdek	POL	27 Jun 2017	Ostrava, Czech Republic
African	81.27	Mostafa Al-Gamel	EGY	21 Mar 2014	Cairo, Egypt
Asian	84.86	Koji Murofushi	JPN	29 Jun 2003	Prague, Czech Republic
NACAC	82.52	Lance Deal	USA	7 Sep 1996	Milan, Italy
South American	78.63	Wagner Domingos	BRA	19 Jun 2016	Celje, Slovenia
European	86.74	Yuriy Sedykh	URS	30 Aug 1986	Stuttgart, West Germany
Oceanian	79.29	Stuart Rendell	AUS	6 Jul 2002	Varaždin, Croatia

No records were set at the competition.

== Qualification standard ==
The standard to qualify automatically for entry was 76.00 metres.

== Schedule ==
The event schedule, in local time (UTC+1), is as follows:

Date	Time	Round
9 August	19:20	Qualification
11 August	20:30	Final

== Results ==
=== Qualification ===
The qualification round took place on 9 August, in two groups, with Group A starting at 19:22 and Group B starting at 20:50. Athletes attaining a mark of at least 75.50 metres ( Q ) or at least the 12 best performers ( q ) qualified for the final. The overall results were as follows:

Rank	Group	Name	Nationality	Round			Mark	Notes
Rank	Group	Name	Nationality	1	2	3	Mark	Notes
1	B	Wojciech Nowicki	Poland	76.85			76.85	Q
2	A	Paweł Fajdek	Poland	71.43	76.82		76.82	Q
3	A	Quentin Bigot	France	76.11			76.11	Q
4	A	Pavel Bareisha	Belarus	x	74.07	75.98	75.98	Q
5	A	Bence Halász	Hungary	75.56			75.56	Q
6	A	Dilshod Nazarov	Tajikistan	x	75.54		75.54	Q
7	A	Nick Miller	Great Britain & N.I.	75.52			75.52	Q
8	A	Aleksei Sokirskiy	Authorised Neutral Athletes	75.50			75.50	Q
9	B	Serghei Marghiev	Moldova	75.18	73.41	74.96	75.18	q
10	B	Valeriy Pronkin	Authorised Neutral Athletes	74.11	73.75	75.09	75.09	q
11	A	Özkan Baltacı	Turkey	74.69	74.16	74.46	74.69	q
12	A	Marco Lingua	Italy	74.41	x	x	74.41	q
13	B	Marcel Lomnický	Slovakia	74.26	73.35	x	74.26	
14	B	Krisztián Pars	Hungary	74.08	x	73.36	74.08	
15	A	David Söderberg	Finland	73.76	x	x	73.76	
16	B	Eşref Apak	Turkey	73.55	x	x	73.55	
17	A	Sergey Litvinov	Authorised Neutral Athletes	73.32	73.48	73.36	73.48	
18	B	Zakhar Makhrosenka	Belarus	x	72.58	x	72.58	
19	A	Allan Wolski	Brazil	x	x	72.51	72.51	
20	B	Alex Young	United States	x	72.07	70.93	72.07	
21	B	Chris Bennett	Great Britain & N.I.	x	72.05	69.12	72.05	
22	B	Siarhei Kalamoyets	Belarus	71.90	68.97	x	71.90	
23	B	Ashraf Amgad Elseify	Qatar	71.87	x	71.00	71.87	
24	B	Wagner Domingos	Brazil	x	69.59	71.69	71.69	
25	A	Serhii Reheda	Ukraine	70.03	71.10	71.53	71.53	
26	B	Diego del Real	Mexico	68.10	70.72	71.29	71.29	
27	A	Hilmar Örn Jónsson	Iceland	71.12	x	x	71.12	
28	B	Mihail Anastasakis	Greece	70.94	70.93	69.95	70.94	
29	A	Mohamed Mahmoud Hassan	Egypt	x	x	69.92	69.92	
30	B	Simone Falloni	Italy	x	69.90	x	69.90	
31	A	Rudy Winkler	United States	68.77	x	68.88	68.88	
32	B	Kibwé Johnson	United States	68.86	x	68.81	68.86	

=== Final ===
The final took place on 11 August at 20:30. The results were as follows:

Rank	Name	Nationality	Round						Mark	Notes
Rank	Name	Nationality	1	2	3	4	5	6	Mark	Notes
1st place, gold medalist(s)	Paweł Fajdek	Poland	x	77.09	79.73	79.81	79.40	x	79.81	
2nd place, silver medalist(s)	Valeriy Pronkin	Authorised Neutral Athletes	77.00	77.20	75.71	76.25	77.98	78.16	78.16	
3rd place, bronze medalist(s)	Wojciech Nowicki	Poland	76.36	76.54	78.03	76.19	x	x	78.03	
4	Quentin Bigot	France	77.05	76.26	77.46	77.67	x	76.87	77.67	
5	Aleksei Sokirskiy	Authorised Neutral Athletes	76.22	77.50	77.15	x	x	x	77.50	SB
6	Nick Miller	Great Britain & N.I.	x	75.78	77.31	x	76.16	x	77.31	
7	Dilshod Nazarov	Tajikistan	76.33	77.22	75.36	76.01	77.14	74.91	77.22	
8	Serghei Marghiev	Moldova	75.40	75.87	75.80	75.85	74.57	x	75.87	
9	Pavel Bareisha	Belarus	74.35	75.86	x				75.86	
10	Marco Lingua	Italy	69.64	75.13	x				75.13	
11	Bence Halász	Hungary	70.89	x	74.45				74.45	
12	Özkan Baltacı	Turkey	73.17	72.90	74.39				74.39	
