= Paweł Fajdek =

Polish hammer thrower (born 1989)

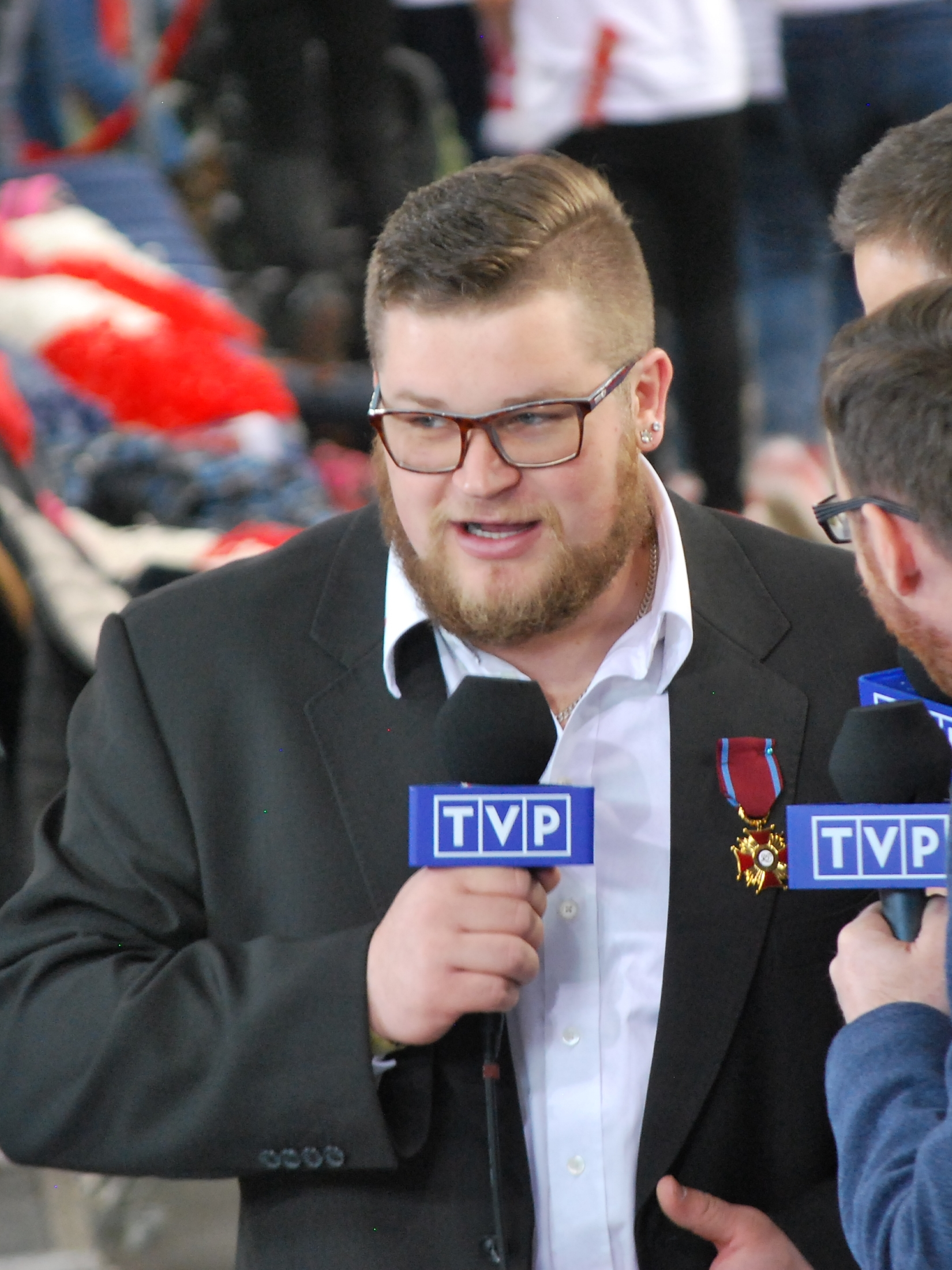
- Fajdek in 2015

Personal information
- Nationality: Polish
- Born: 4 June 1989 (age 37) Świebodzice, Poland
- Education: Academy of Sport Education in Warsaw
- Height: 1.86 m (6 ft 1 in)
- Weight: 128 kg (282 lb)

Sport
- Country: Poland
- Sport: Athletics
- Event: Hammer throw
- Club: Agros Zamość
Medal record
Men's athletics
Representing Poland
Event	1st	2nd	3rd
Olympic Games	0	0	1
World Championships	5	0	0
European Championships	1	2	0
Continental Cup	0	0	0
European Team Championships	3	2	0
Summer Universiade	4	0	0
Total	13	4	1
Olympic Games
Bronze medal – third place	2020 Tokyo	Hammer throw
World Championships
Gold medal – first place	2013 Moscow	Hammer throw
Gold medal – first place	2015 Beijing	Hammer throw
Gold medal – first place	2017 London	Hammer throw
Gold medal – first place	2019 Doha	Hammer throw
Gold medal – first place	2022 Eugene	Hammer throw
European Championships
Gold medal – first place	2016 Amsterdam	Hammer throw
Silver medal – second place	2014 Zurich	Hammer throw
Silver medal – second place	2018 Berlin	Hammer throw
European Team Championships
Gold medal – first place	2013 Gateshead	Hammer throw
Gold medal – first place	2015 Cheboksary	Hammer throw
Gold medal – first place	2021 Chorzów	Hammer throw
Silver medal – second place	2011 Stockholm	Hammer throw
Silver medal – second place	2014 Braunschweig	Hammer throw
European U23 Championships
Gold medal – first place	2011 Ostrava	Hammer throw
Universiade
Gold medal – first place	2011 Shenzhen	Hammer throw
Gold medal – first place	2013 Kazan	Hammer throw
Gold medal – first place	2015 Gwangju	Hammer throw
Gold medal – first place	2017 Taipei	Hammer throw
Jeux de la Francophonie
Gold medal – first place	2013 Nice	Hammer throw

Paweł Fajdek (Polish pronunciation: [ˈpavɛw ˈfajdɛk]; born 4 June 1989) is a Polish hammer thrower, a five-time World Champion, European Champion, Olympic bronze medal winner, multiple Polish Champion and Polish men's hammer throw record holder. In 2013, he became the youngest world champion in the event. His personal best throw of 83.93 metres was achieved on 9 August 2015 at the Janusz Kusociński Memorial in Szczecin.

A clip of Fajdek's 80.05-metre record at the 2015 Summer Universiade, Guangzhou

== Career ==
Fajdek represented Poland at the 2008 World Junior Championships in Bydgoszcz, finishing just off the podium in 4th despite throwing a new Polish junior record of 75.31 metres with the 6 kg under-20 implement. In 2009, his first year as a senior, Fajdek placed 8th at the European U23 Championships in Kaunas, Lithuania with a throw of 68.70 metres. Fajdek placed 3rd at the Polish Championships that year with a mark of 70.86, behind former Olympic and World Champion Szymon Ziółkowski and a returning Wojciech Kondratowicz. In 2010 he grabbed another national bronze, this time with a throw of 73.85 metres; later that year, he improved his personal best to 76.07, good enough for 35th in the world.

Fajdek continued to improve in 2011, finishing second at the European Team Championships in Stockholm with a new personal best of 76.98 metres. He improved further to 78.13 at Madrid, beating among others the reigning Olympic Champion, Primož Kozmus of Slovenia. He was an overwhelming winner at the European U23 Championships in Ostrava, Czech Republic, beating second placer Javier Cienfuegos by five and a half metres to record yet another personal best of 78.54. He also dominated his speciality at the World University Games in Shenzhen, winning the gold with 78.14, more than four metres ahead of silver medallist Marcel Lomnický; a week later at the World Championships in Daegu, however, he only managed 75.20 and finished eleventh.

Fajdek first broke 80 metres at the Ostrava Golden Spike meeting in May 2012, finishing second to Hungary's World silver medallist Krisztián Pars. In his next competition at Montreuil he threw yet another personal best of 81.39, this time beating Pars.

Fajdek is currently coached by Czesław Cybulski, who has also coached Ziółkowski and Anita Włodarczyk.

At the 2020 Summer Olympics, he won his first Olympic medal (bronze) in the men's hammer throw by achieving 81.53 meters, finishing behind Wojciech Nowicki and Eivind Henriksen.

In 2022, by winning gold medal at the 2022 World Athletics Championships with the result of 81.98 meters, Fajdek became only the second athlete in history to win five back-to-back gold medals at the event, after pole vaulter Sergey Bubka, who eventually won six consecutive titles.

== Competition record ==
Year	Competition	Venue	Position	Event	Notes
Representing Poland
2008	World Junior Championships	Bydgoszcz, Poland	4th	Hammer throw (6 kg)	75.31 m
2009	European U23 Championships	Kaunas, Lithuania	8th	Hammer throw	68.70 m
2011	European U23 Championships	Ostrava, Czech Republic	1st	Hammer throw	78.54 m
2011	Universiade	Shenzhen, China	1st	Hammer throw	78.14 m
2011	World Championships	Daegu, South Korea	11th	Hammer throw	75.20 m
2012	Olympic Games	London, United Kingdom	–	Hammer throw	NM
2013	Universiade	Kazan, Russia	1st	Hammer throw	79.99 m
2013	World Championships	Moscow, Russia	1st	Hammer throw	81.97 m
2013	Jeux de la Francophonie	Nice, France	1st	Hammer throw	78.28 m
2014	European Championships	Zurich, Switzerland	2nd	Hammer throw	82.05 m
2015	Universiade	Gwangju, South Korea	1st	Hammer throw	80.05 m
2015	World Championships	Beijing, China	1st	Hammer throw	80.88 m
2016	European Championships	Amsterdam, Netherlands	1st	Hammer throw	80.93 m
2016	Olympic Games	Rio de Janeiro, Brazil	17th (q)	Hammer throw	72.00 m
2017	World Championships	London, United Kingdom	1st	Hammer throw	79.86 m
2017	Universiade	Taipei, Taiwan	1st	Hammer throw	79.16 m
2018	European Championships	Berlin, Germany	2nd	Hammer throw	78.69 m
2019	World Championships	Doha, Qatar	1st	Hammer throw	80.50 m
2021	European Team Championships	Chorzów, Poland	1st	Hammer throw	82.98 m
2021	Olympic Games	Tokyo, Japan	3rd	Hammer throw	81.53 m
2022	World Championships	Eugene, United States	1st	Hammer throw	81.98 m
2022	European Championships	Munich, Germany	4th	Hammer throw	79.15 m
2023	World Championships	Budapest, Hungary	4th	Hammer throw	80.00 m
2024	European Championships	Rome, Italy	6th	Hammer throw	77.50 m
2024	Olympic Games	Paris, France	5th	Hammer throw	78.80 m
2025	World Championships	Tokyo, Japan	7th	Hammer throw	77.75 m
2026	European Championships	Birmingham, United Kingdom	5th	Hammer throw	79.13 m
2026	World Ultimate Championship	Budapest, Hungary	6th	Hammer throw	76.11 m
