= Diego del Real =

Mexican hammer thrower (born 1994)

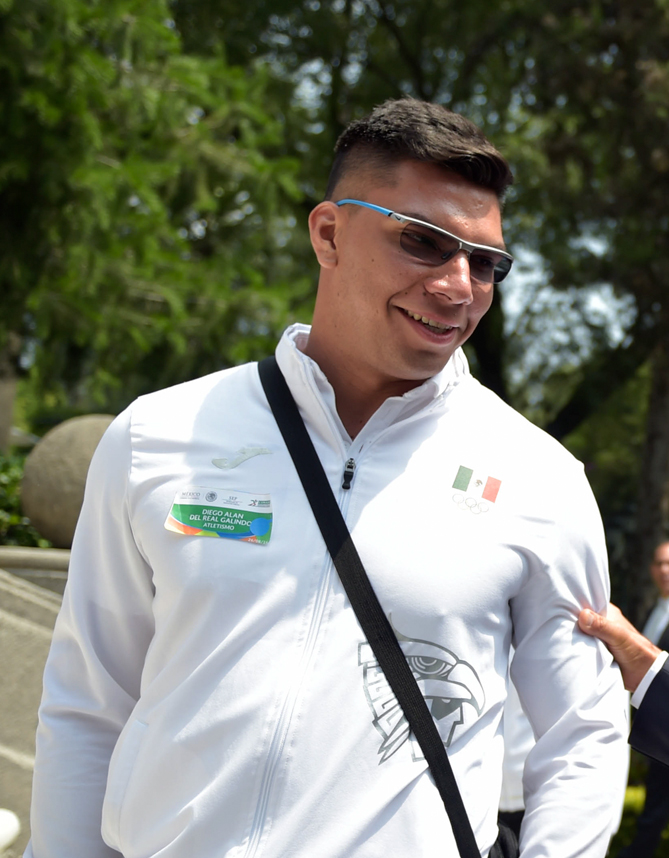
- Del Real in 2016

Personal information
- Full name: Diego Alan del Real Galindo
- Nationality: Mexico
- Born: 6 March 1994 (age 32) Monterrey, Nuevo León, Mexico
- Height: 1.88 m (6 ft 2 in)
- Weight: 112 kg (247 lb)

Sport
- Sport: Track and field
- Event: Hammer throw
- Club: Puro D Club y Casa Morelos
- Coached by: Alejandro Laverdesque

Achievements and titles
- Personal bests: HT (7.26 kg): 77.49 m (Querétaro 2016) HT (6 kg): 74.37 m (Mexico City 2012) HT (5 kg): 75.07 m (Mexico City 2011)
Medal record
Men's Athletics
Representing Mexico
CAC Championships
Silver medal – second place	2013 Morelia	Hammer throw
Pan American Junior Championships
Silver medal – second place	2011 Miramar	Hammer throw
CAC Junior Championships (Junior)
Gold medal – first place	2012 San Salvador	Hammer throw
- Updated on 27 December 2014

Diego Alan del Real Galindo (born 6 March 1994) is a Mexican hammer thrower.

He competed in boys' hammer throw at the 2010 Summer Youth Olympics, finishing first in the B final and then 4th at the 2016 Summer Olympics.

== Personal life ==
Diego Alan Del Real Galindo was born in Monterrey, Nuevo León, Mexico. He is also known as "El Gato", since he was a kid. Del Real studied at Universidad Autónoma de Nuevo León.

Del Real is coached by Alejandro Laverdesque.

== Personal best ==
Event	Result	Venue	Date
Hammer throw	78.86m A	Nuevo León, Mexico	24 April 2021

== International competitions ==
Year	Competition	Venue	Position	Event	Notes
Representing Mexico
2010	Central American and Caribbean; Junior Championships (U17)	Santo Domingo, Dominican Republic	1st	Hammer (5 kg)	61.27 m
2010	Youth Olympic Games	Singapore	9th (B)	Hammer (5 kg)	69.66 m
2011	World Youth Championships	Villeneuve d'Ascq, France	6th	Hammer (5 kg)	72.21 m
2011	Pan American Junior Championships	Miramar, United States	2nd	Hammer (6 kg)	66.77 m
2011	Pan American Games	Guadalajara, Mexico	10th	Hammer	59.41 m A
2012	Central American and Caribbean; Junior Championships (U20)	San Salvador, El Salvador	1st	Hammer (6 kg)	73.96 m
2012	World Junior Championships	Barcelona, Spain	17th (q)	Hammer (6 kg)	69.56 m
2013	Central American and Caribbean Championships	Morelia, Mexico	2nd	Hammer	65.35 m A
2013	Pan American Junior Championships	Medellín, Colombia	1st	Hammer (6 kg)	72.99 m A
2014	NACAC Under-23 Championships	Kamloops, Canada	1st	Hammer	69.42 m
2014	Central American and Caribbean Games	Xalapa, Mexico	4th	Hammer	69.84 m A
2015	Pan American Games	Toronto, Canada	6th	Hammer	71.74 m
2015	NACAC Championships	San José, Costa Rica	3rd	Hammer	70.83 m
2016	NACAC U23 Championships	San Salvador, El Salvador	1st	Hammer	74.55 m
2016	Olympic Games	Rio de Janeiro, Brazil	4th	Hammer	76.05 m
2017	World Championships	London, United Kingdom	26th (q)	Hammer	71.29 m
2017	Universiade	Taipei, Taiwan	3rd (q)	Hammer	70.50 m^{1}
2018	Central American and Caribbean Games	Barranquilla, Colombia	1st	Hammer	74.95 m
2019	Pan American Games	Lima, Peru	4th	Hammer	74.16 m
2019	World Championships	Doha, Qatar	21st (q)	Hammer	73.15 m
2021	Olympic Games	Tokyo, Japan	15th (q)	Hammer	75.17 m
2022	World Championships	Eugene, United States	16th (q)	Hammer	74.12 m
2023	Central American and Caribbean Games	San Salvador, El Salvador	2nd	Hammer	74.57 m
2023	World Championships	Budapest, Hungary	12th	Hammer	72.56 m
2023	Pan American Games	Santiago, Chile	4th	Hammer	75.63 m
2024	Olympic Games	Paris, France	22nd (q)	Hammer	72.10 m
2025	NACAC Championships	Freeport, Bahamas	5th	Hammer	71.68 m
2026	Pan American Championships	Medellín, Colombia	4th	Hammer throw	74.23 m
2026	Central American and Caribbean Games	Santo Domingo, Dominican Republic	3rd	Hammer throw	73.00 m

^{1}No mark in the final
