= Özkan Baltacı =

Turkish hammer thrower (born 1994)

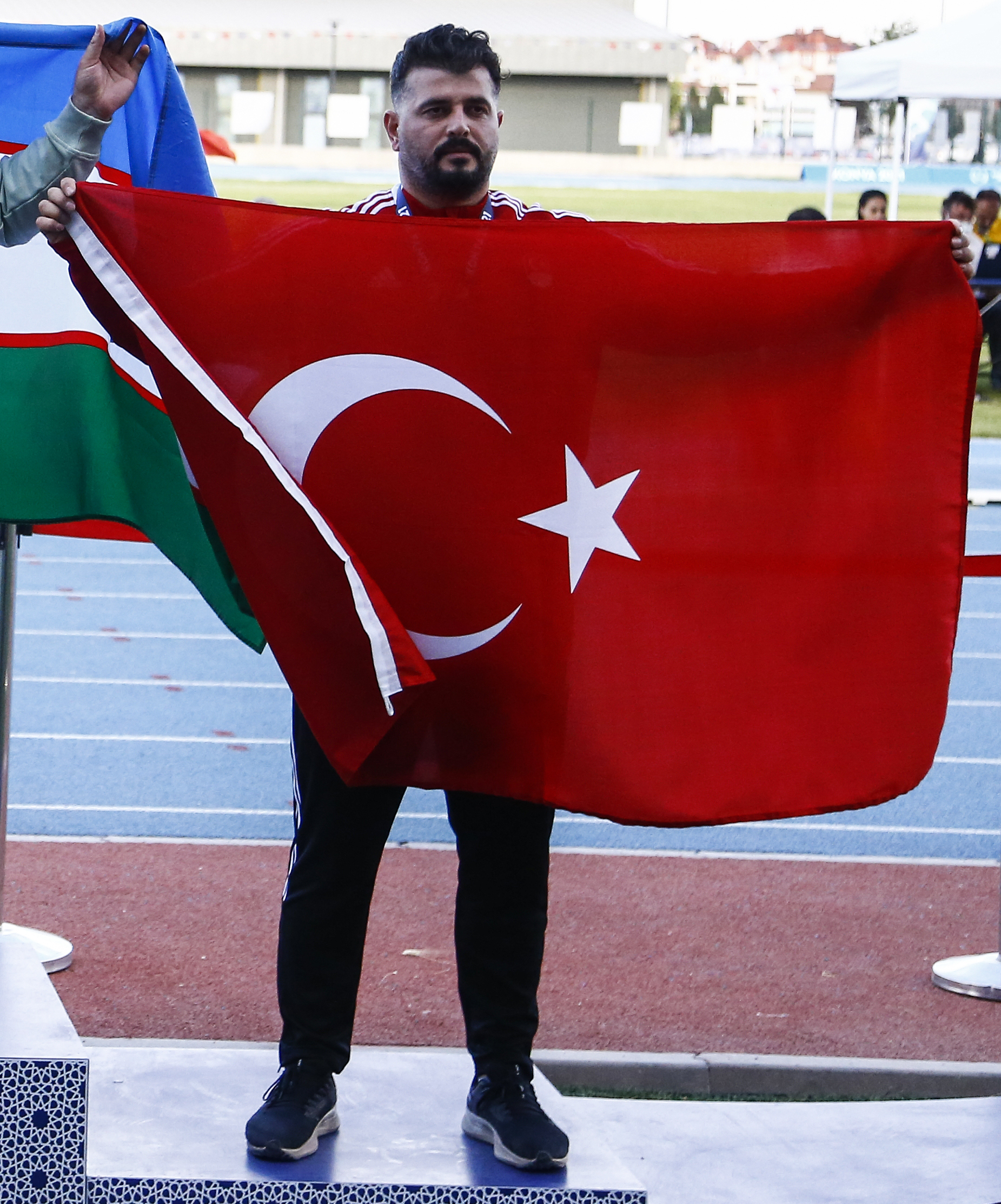
- Özkan Baltacı in 2022

Personal information
- Born: 13 February 1994 (age 32) İzmir, Turkey

Sport
- Country: Turkey
- Sport: Athletics
- Event: Hammer throw
- Club: Fenerbahçe Athletics
Medal record
Summer World University Games
Gold medal – first place	2019 Naples	Hammer throw
Mediterranean Games
Gold medal – first place	2022 Oran	Hammer throw
Islamic Solidarity Games
Silver medal – second place	2017 Baku	Hammer throw
Bronze medal – third place	2021 Konya	Hammer throw
European Team Championships
Silver medal – second place	2025 Maribor	Hammer throw

Özkan Baltacı (born 13 February 1994) is a Turkish hammer thrower.

== Sport career ==
Baltacı is a member of Fenerbahçe Athletics in Istanbul.

In age-specific categories, he won the silver medal at the 2011 World Youth Championships, the bronze medal at the 2011 European Youth Olympic Festival and finished tenth at the 2012 World Junior Championships. He also competed at the 2010 World Junior Championships and the 2015 European U23 Championships without reaching the final.

He finished ninth at the 2016 European Championships, won the silver medal at the 2017 Islamic Solidarity Games, finished fifth at the 2017 Universiade and finished twelfth at the 2017 World Championships. He also competed at the 2018 European Championships without reaching the final. He won the gold medal at the Athletics at the 2019 Summer Universiade held in Naples, Italy.

His personal best throw is 76.84 metres, achieved in May 2018 in Mersin.<ref=bio/>

Baltacı represented Turkey at the 2024 Summer Olympics in Paris, France finishing in the 27th place with his hammer throw of 71.40 m.

He won the silver medal in the hammer throw event with 74.58 m at the 2025 European Athletics Team Championships in Maribor, Slovenia. He contributed to his team's record with 15 points.
