= 2015 European Athletics U23 Championships – Men's hammer throw =

The men's hammer throw event at the 2015 European Athletics U23 Championships was held in Tallinn, Estonia, at Kadriorg Stadium on 9 and 10 July.

== Medalists ==
Gold	Nick Miller; United Kingdom
Silver	Valeriy Pronkin; Russia
Bronze	Bence Pásztor; Hungary

== Results ==
=== Final ===
10 July

Rank	Name	Nationality	Attempts						Result	Notes
Rank	Name	Nationality	1	2	3	4	5	6	Result	Notes
1st place, gold medalist(s)	Nick Miller	United Kingdom	x	74.46	74.01	x	x	x	74.46	
2nd place, silver medalist(s)	Valeriy Pronkin	Russia	x	74.29	71.11	72.30	73.22	72.13	74.29	
3rd place, bronze medalist(s)	Bence Pásztor	Hungary	61.86	74.06	x	72.18	72.90	68.36	74.06	
4	Mihaíl Anastasákis	Greece	71.55	71.64	x	x	x	x	71.64	
5	Juho Saarikoski	Finland	70.94	70.19	70.04	x	68.25	69.22	70.94	
6	Yury Vasilchanka	Belarus	x	70.48	x	67.59	x	x	70.48	
7	Jesse Lehto	Finland	68.69	66.31	70.05	x	68.49	x	70.05	
8	Serhiy Reheda	Ukraine	65.73	x	69.42	68.59	x	x	69.42	
9	Arkadiusz Rogowski	Poland	68.81	68.23	68.92				68.92	
10	Aykhan Apti	Bulgaria	68.01	68.00	66.81				68.01	
11	Tommi Remes	Finland	67.29	x	x				67.29	
12	Alexandros Poursanidis	Cyprus	x	61.60	65.55				65.55	

=== Qualifications ===
9 July

Rank	Name	Nationality	Attempts			Result	Notes
Rank	Name	Nationality	1	2	3	Result	Notes
1	Valeriy Pronkin	Russia	70.92	72.35		72.35	Q
2	Mihaíl Anastasákis	Greece	68.64	71.60		71.60	Q
3	Nick Miller	United Kingdom	71.37	x	71.29	71.37	q
4	Bence Pásztor	Hungary	70.56	–	–	70.56	q
5	Aykhan Apti	Bulgaria	68.66	69.17	70.01	70.01	q
6	Juho Saarikoski	Finland	68.19	69.87	68.30	69.87	q
7	Jesse Lehto	Finland	66.95	68.26	69.76	69.76	q
8	Serhiy Reheda	Ukraine	x	62.11	69.03	69.03	q
9	Tommi Remes	Finland	68.27	64.96	67.15	68.27	q
10	Yury Vasilchanka	Belarus	x	67.93	66.09	67.93	q
11	Arkadiusz Rogowski	Poland	67.24	x	67.13	67.24	q
12	Alexandros Poursanidis	Cyprus	65.78	65.95	67.16	67.16	q
13	Patrizio Di Blasio	Italy	66.61	63.67	66.54	66.61	
14	Sebastian Nowicki	Poland	63.85	65.01	66.34	66.34	
15	Oskar Vestlund	Sweden	x	65.79	63.65	65.79	
16	Dempsey McGuigan	Ireland	63.19	65.09	65.05	65.09	
17	Márton Cser	Hungary	64.89	62.34	63.84	64.89	
18	Marco Bortolato	Italy	63.25	64.33	64.86	64.86	
19	Artem Poleshko	Ukraine	57.28	61.53	64.15	64.15	
20	Balázs Töreky	Hungary	64.10	x	63.48	64.10	
21	Özkan Baltacı	Turkey	63.79	63.32	63.61	63.79	
22	Alexander Larsson	Sweden	x	x	63.78	63.78	
23	Tolgahan Yavuz	Turkey	61.87	55.65	62.81	62.81	
24	Lowe Litzell	Sweden	60.06	62.61	x	62.61	
25	Antonio Malora	Croatia	x	59.94	62.53	62.53	
26	Kevin Arreaga	Spain	61.81	61.47	x	61.81	
27	Kjetil Røste Ringen	Norway	60.50	59.13	x	60.50	
28	Martynas Šedys	Lithuania	x	57.06	57.67	57.67	

== Participation ==
According to an unofficial count, 28 athletes from 18 countries participated in the event.

- Belarus (1)
- Bulgaria (1)
- Croatia (1)
- Cyprus (1)
- Finland (3)
- Greece (1)
- Hungary (3)
- Ireland (1)
- Italy (2)
- Lithuania (1)
- Norway (1)
- Poland (2)
- Russia (1)
- Spain (1)
- Sweden (3)
- Turkey (2)
- Ukraine (2)
- United Kingdom (1)
