= Nick Miller (hammer thrower) =

British hammer thrower

Personal information
- Nationality: British (English)
- Born: 1 May 1993 (age 33)
- Height: 1.88 m (6 ft 2 in)
- Weight: 112 kg (247 lb)

Sport
- Sport: Athletics
- Event: Hammer throw
Medal record
Representing Great Britain
Athletics World Cup
Silver medal – second place	2018 London	Hammer throw
European Athletics U23 Championships
Gold medal – first place	2015 Tallinn	Hammer throw
Representing England
Commonwealth Games
Silver medal – second place	2014 Glasgow	Hammer throw
Gold medal – first place	2018 Gold Coast	Hammer throw
Gold medal – first place	2022 Birmingham	Hammer throw

Nicholas Miller (born 1 May 1993) is a British track and field athlete who specialises in the hammer throw. He was the gold medallist at the 2018 Commonwealth Games and 2022 Commonwealth Games, a silver medallist at the 2014 Commonwealth Games and the gold medal at the 2015 European Athletics U23 Championships. He holds the British record of 80.26 m (263 ft 3 3/4 in) for the event.

He represented Great Britain at the 2012 World Junior Championships in Athletics and the 2013 European Athletics U23 Championships. He studied at Oklahoma State University and is a five-time Big 12 Conference champion (three times in hammer, twice in weight throw). His personal best in the weight throw of 23.07 m (75 ft 8 1/4 in) is the British record. He is also a two-time runner-up at the NCAA Championships.

== Career ==
=== Early life and career ===
Born and raised in Carlisle, Cumbria, he became interested in athletics after working with Jack Harper-Tarr, a physical education teacher and athletics judge. Miller began training in throwing events at the local club, Border Harriers & Athletics Club, where Harper-Tarr coached. Miller preferred individual sports and also took part in karate, winning a national youth age-category competition. Initially, he competed in a variety of track and field throwing events, but he became increasingly interested in the hammer throw after seeing a rival youngster throw beyond sixty metres.

Miller achieved this feat himself with the 5 kg implement in 2009, winning the Cumbria Schools Championships. In 2010 he won the English junior (under-20) championships with a mark of 66.79 m (219 ft 1 1/2 in) with the 6 kg hammer. He repeated as champion the following year and also won the English Schools Championships title. After finishing school, he gained an athletic scholarship to study a multi-disciplinary degree at the Oklahoma State University. In joining the American college, he followed in the footsteps of a fellow Border Harrier, distance runner Tom Farrell, who began studying there in 2010.

=== Move to Oklahoma ===
Miller began to compete athletically for the Oklahoma State Cowboys team and took up the weight throw event. His throwing coach, John Baumann, had trained several Olympians, including Gia Lewis-Smallwood. Miller was runner-up at his first major college event, the 2012 Big 12 Conference indoor championships. Throwing with the senior weight implement, he set a series of personal bests at the start of the outdoor season: he threw 65.09 m (213 ft 6 1/2 in) for second at the Texas Relays, before improving to 66.88 m (219 ft 5 in), then 67.06 m (220 ft 0 in). He was the champion of the Big 12 Outdoor Championship, becoming Oklahoma State's first conference hammer throw winner since 1901. In July that year he had another best with a mark of 67.56 m (221 ft 7 3/4 in) before going on to represent Great Britain in the qualifiers at the 2012 World Junior Championships in Athletics.

He established himself as a top weight thrower in the 2013 indoor season, winning the Big 12 title before placing fourth at the NCAA Men's Indoor Track and Field Championship with a school record of 21.48 m (70 ft 5 1/2 in). In the hammer he cleared seventy metres for the first time at the Mt. SAC Relays. He defended his Big 12 hammer title with a stadium record in Waco, Texas and won at the NCAA qualifier meet with a new best of 71.60 m (234 ft 10 3/4 in). He gave his worst performance of the season at the NCAA Outdoor finals, finishing in ninth place with a sub-65-metre throw. He was similarly off his best at the 2013 European Athletics U23 Championships, where he also ended the competition in ninth place.

He improved again in the weight throw the following indoor season, culminating a new best mark of 23.07 m (75 ft 8 1/4 in), which brought him second place at the NCAA Indoor Championships and a British record. He also defended his Big 12 indoor title that season. He won a third straight Big 12 outdoor hammer title with a throw of 74.38 m (244 ft 1/4 in) – a personal best, school record, stadium record, and Big 12 Conference record. His winning margin was more than fifteen metres. He was runner-up in the NCAA Outdoor hammer throw that year, second only to Matthias Tayala.

=== Commonwealth medal ===
He won his first senior international selection for the 2014 European Team Championships and placed fifth for Great Britain. A week later, he was close to his best at the British Athletics Championships and won his first national title with a mark of 73.96 m (242 ft 7 3/4 in). This led to his inclusion in the English team for the 2014 Commonwealth Games and at the event in Glasgow he threw 72.99 m (239 ft 5 1/2 in) to take the silver medal behind James Steacy – Miller's first international medal. In spite of this, Miller said "a little bit of me is a bit upset I didn't win but part of me is just 'what a fantastic achievement'". Won gold in the hammerthrow at the 2022 commonwealth games in Birmingham

== Personal bests ==
- Hammer throw – 80.26 m (263 ft 3 3/4 in) (Commonwealth Games 2018)
- Shot put – 11.92 m (39 ft 1 1/4 in) (2012)
- Weight throw – 23.07 m (75 ft 8 1/4 in) (2014)
- Discus throw – 45.37 m (148 ft 10 in) (2013)
- Javelin throw – 52.54 m (172 ft 4 1/2 in) (2010)

== International competitions ==
Year	Competition	Venue	Position	Event	Notes
2012	World Junior Championships	Barcelona, Spain	13th (q)	Hammer throw (6 kg)	67.46 m
2013	European U23 Championships	Tampere, Finland	9th	Hammer throw	66.64 m
2014	European Team Championships	Braunschweig, Germany	5th	Hammer throw	73.56 m
2014	Commonwealth Games	Glasgow, United Kingdom	2nd	Hammer throw	72.99 m
2015	European U23 Championships	Tallinn, Estonia	1st	Hammer throw	74.46 m
2015	World Championships	Beijing, China	11th	Hammer throw	72.94 m
2016	European Championships	Amsterdam, Netherlands	25th (q)	Hammer throw	67.76 m
2016	Olympic Games	Rio de Janeiro, Brazil	22nd (q)	Hammer throw	70.83 m
2017	World Championships	London, United Kingdom	6th	Hammer throw	77.31 m
2018	Commonwealth Games	Gold Coast, Australia	1st	Hammer throw	80.26 m GR NR
2018	World Cup	London, United Kingdom	2nd	Hammer throw	76.14 m
2018	European Championships	Berlin, Germany	10th	Hammer throw	73.16 m
2019	World Championships	Doha, Qatar	10th	Hammer throw	75.31 m
2021	Olympic Games	Tokyo, Japan	6th	Hammer throw	78.15 m
2022	World Championships	Eugene, United States	11th	Hammer throw	73.74 m
2022	European Championships	Munich, Germany	8th	Hammer throw	77.29 m
