= Serhiy Reheda =

Ukrainian hammer thrower

Personal information
- Born: 6 February 1994 (age 32)

Sport
- Country: Ukraine
- Sport: Athletics
- Event: Hammer throw
Medal record
Men's athletics
Representing Ukraine
World Youth Championships
Bronze medal – third place	2011 Lille	Hammer throw
Summer Universiade
Silver medal – second place	2019 Napoli	Hammer throw
European Youth Olympic Festival
Silver medal – second place	2011 Trabzon	Hammer throw

Serhiy Reheda (born 6 February 1994) is a Ukrainian hammer thrower.

In age-specific categories he won the bronze medal at the 2011 World Youth Championships, finished ninth at the 2012 World Junior Championships and eighth at the 2015 European U23 Championships.

He finished seventh at the 2017 Universiade. He also competed at the 2016 European Championships, the 2017 World Championships and the 2018 European Championships without reaching the final.

His personal best throw is 76.92 metres, achieved in May 2017 in Kyiv.
