= Javier Cienfuegos =

Spanish hammer thrower (born 1990)

Personal information
- Full name: Javier Cienfuegos Pinilla
- Nationality: Spanish
- Born: 15 July 1990 (age 36)
- Height: 1.93 m (6 ft 4 in)
- Weight: 134 kg (295 lb)

Sport
- Country: Spain
- Sport: Athletics
- Event: Hammer throw
Medal record
European Junior Championships
Bronze medal – third place	2009 Novi Sad	Hammer throw
European Cup Winter Throwing
Gold medal – first place	2009 Los Realejos	Hammer throw
Gold medal – first place	2010 Arles	Hammer throw
- Updated on 14 August 2012

Javier Cienfuegos Pinilla (born 15 July 1990 in Montijo-Badajoz) is a Spanish hammer thrower and the junior world record holder. Javier represents his club CA Playas de Castellón, and is coached by Raul Jimeno. His personal best and junior world record with the 6 kg hammer, a throw of 82,96 m, was set in Madrid 17 June 2009. On 5 May 2012, he became the Spanish record holder with the senior weight hammer, which weighs 7,26 kg (16 lbs), after making a throw of 76,21 meters. He established a new national record of 78.70 m at the Estadi Olímpic Camilo Cano of La Nucia, on 31 August 2019. On 6 September 2019, he improved this record with a mark of 79.38 m.

== Sports career ==
Cienfuegos's first international championship was the 2007 World Youth Championships in Athletics (u18) held in Ostrava, Czech Republic. He was 17 years old at the time, and he finished 8th with a throw of 64,04 m with the 5 kg hammer – a relatively poor result, as his personal best, set four months earlier, was 73,20 m. Ukrainian Andriy Martynyuk emerged victorious with a throw of 76,09 m. Next year, his first year as a junior, he attended the 2008 World Junior Championships in Athletics (u20) in which he finished 12th in the final with a 65,93 m throw with the 6 kg hammer – also a relatively bad performance, his personal best at the time was 76,13 m, set three weeks earlier. Cienfuegos's nerves seemed to be the problem but the expectations only rose in 2009 when he beat Yevgeny Aydamirov's junior world record of 82,62 m and then set a new junior world record with his 82,96 m throw. After more international competition experience, as well as three throws beyond 80 meters, he seemed to have learned how to cope with the pressure. He won the ninth annual European Cup Winter Throwing Championship (u23 group B) with a 73,18 m performance (hammer weight = 7,26 kg). He placed third (79,12 m) at the 2009 European Athletics Junior Championships behind youth World Champion from 2007, Ukrainian Andriy Martynyuk (79,54 m) and Hungarian Ákos Hudi (79,14 m) in one of history's toughest ever junior hammer competitions. Cienfuegos also attended the 2009 World Championships in Athletics and finished 13th in his qualifying group with a 72,01 performance (7,26 kg hammer).

== Political career ==
Cienfuegos ran 3rd in the People's Party (PP) list for Badajoz vis-à-vis the 2019 Extremaduran regional election, becoming a member of the 10th Assembly of Extremadura.

== International honours ==
Year	Competition	Venue	Position	Event	Notes
Representing Spain
2007	World Youth Championships	Ostrava, Czech Republic	18th (q)	Hammer throw (5 kg)	64.04 m
2007	European Junior Championships	Hengelo, Netherlands	20th (q)	Hammer throw (6 kg)	63.74 m
2008	World Junior Championships	Bydgoszcz, Poland	12th	Hammer throw (6 kg)	65.93 m
2009	European Junior Championships	Novi Sad, Serbia	3rd	Hammer throw (6 kg)	79.12 m
2009	World Championships	Berlin, Germany	24th (q)	Hammer throw	72.01 m
2010	European Cup Winter Throwing (U23)	Arles, France	1st	Hammer throw	71.60 m
2010	Ibero-American Championships	San Fernando, Spain	4th	Hammer throw	69.39 m
2010	European Championships	Barcelona, Spain	18th (q)	Hammer throw	72.19 m
2011	European U23 Championships	Ostrava, Czech Republic	2nd	Hammer throw	73.03 m
2011	World Championships	Daegu, South Korea	33rd (q)	Hammer throw	67.49 m
2012	European Championships	Helsinki, Finland	22nd (q)	Hammer throw	70.91 m
2012	Olympic Games	London, United Kingdom	16th (q)	Hammer throw	73.73 m
2013	World Championships	Moscow, Russia	25th (q)	Hammer throw	70.79 m
2014	European Championships	Zürich, Switzerland	15th (q)	Hammer throw	72.55 m
2015	World Championships	Beijing, China	29th (q)	Hammer throw	70.96 m
2016	European Championships	Amsterdam, Netherlands	16th (q)	Hammer throw	68.17 m
2016	Olympic Games	Rio de Janeiro, Brazil	27th (q)	Hammer throw	68.88 m
2018	European Championships	Berlin, Germany	15th (q)	Hammer throw	72.76 m
2018	Ibero-American Championships	Trujillo, Peru	1st	Hammer throw	74.71 m
2019	World Championships	Doha, Qatar	7th	Hammer throw	76.57 m
2021	Olympic Games	Tokyo, Japan	10th	Hammer throw	76.30 m
2022	Ibero-American Championships	La Nucía, Spain	1st	Hammer throw	74.70 m
2022	World Championships	Eugene, United States	14th (q)	Hammer throw	74.25 m
2022	European Championships	Munich, Germany	11th	Hammer throw	73.06 m

== Progression ==
Impl.	Year	Perf.	Date
7.26 kg	2019	79.38	31 August 2019
7.26 kg	2012	76	5 May 2012
7.26 kg	2011	75.02	12 March 2011
7.26 kg	2010	72.00	20 February 2010
6 kg	2009	82.96	17 June 2009
6 kg	2008	76.13	14 June 2008
5 kg	2007	73.20	17 March 2007
