= Athletics at the 2015 Summer Universiade – Men's hammer throw =

The men's hammer throw event at the 2015 Summer Universiade was held on 9 July at the Gwangju Universiade Main Stadium.

== Results ==
Rank	Athlete	Nationality	#1	#2	#3	#4	#5	#6	Result	Notes
1st place, gold medalist(s)	Paweł Fajdek	Poland	x	x	77.31	76.40	x	80.05	80.05	
2nd place, silver medalist(s)	Pavel Bareisha	Belarus	71.43	75.12	x	x	75.75	x	75.75	
3rd place, bronze medalist(s)	Siarhei Kalamoyets	Belarus	73.35	72.86	74.68	x	72.57	x	74.68	
4	Serghei Marghiev	Moldova	x	73.30	x	72.12	72.66	73.65	73.65	
5	Denis Lukyanov	Russia	71.99	73.65	x	72.58	73.02	x	73.65	
6	Eivind Henriksen	Norway	70.70	71.47	69.93	x	68.13	71.19	71.47	
7	Anatoliy Pozdnyakov	Russia	x	70.85	70.16	68.93	x	x	70.85	
8	Simone Falloni	Italy	69.39	69.40	70.58	68.85	70.48	70.52	70.58	
9	Tomáš Kružliak	Slovakia	65.26	69.07	66.85				69.07	
10	Konstantinos Stathelakos	Cyprus	68.26	68.91	x				68.91	
11	Mattias Lindberg	Sweden	64.67	66.12	66.31				66.31	SB
12	Renaldo Frechou	South Africa	61.54	x	64.28				64.28	
13	Qi Dakai	China	63.84	x	60.30				63.84	
14	Jackie Wong Siew Cheer	Malaysia	63.48	60.95	60.89				63.48	
15	Alec Faldermeyer	United States	61.81	62.05	62.73				62.73	
16	Park Young-sic	South Korea	x	61.78	x				61.78	
17	Taj Murmann	Denmark	61.04	59.37	59.29				61.04	
18	Saleem Fadel	Qatar	52.23	49.88	x				52.23	
	Daniel Aguirre	Colombia	x	x	x				NM	
	Isaac Dan	Argentina	x	x	x				NM	
