= 2014 European Athletics Championships – Men's hammer throw =

Men's hammer throw at the European Athletics Championships

The men's hammer throw at the 2014 European Athletics Championships took place at the Letzigrund on 14 and 16 August.

== Medalists ==
Gold	Krisztián Pars; Hungary
Silver	Paweł Fajdek; Poland
Bronze	Pavel Kryvitski; Belarus

== Results ==
=== Qualification ===
75.00 (Q) or at least 12 best performers (q) advanced to the Final.

Rank	Group	Name	Nationality	#1	#2	#3	Mark	Note
1	B	Paweł Fajdek	Poland	x	77.45		77.45	Q
2	B	Serghei Marghiev	Moldova	73.46	x	76.25	76.25	Q
3	A	Marcel Lomnický	Slovakia	74.98	77.06		77.06	Q
4	A	Sergej Litvinov	Russia	76.12			76.12	Q
5	A	Primož Kozmus	Slovenia	75.87			75.87	Q
6	B	David Söderberg	Finland	69.71	75.83		75.83	Q
7	B	Pavel Kryvitski	Belarus	72.87	75.44		75.44	Q
8	A	Szymon Ziółkowski	Poland	71.97	74.54	74.93	74.93	q
9	A	Krisztián Pars	Hungary	74.44	x	x	74.44	q
10	A	Tuomas Seppänen	Finland	x	72.88	74.37	74.37	q
11	B	Nicola Vizzoni	Italy	70.10	74.26	71.26	74.26	q
12	B	Pavel Bareisha	Belarus	72.07	70.41	73.85	73.85	q
13	B	Lukáš Melich	Czech Republic	72.42	70.32	73.48	73.48	
14	B	Kristóf Németh	Hungary	71.64	72.38	73.33	73.33	
15	A	Javier Cienfuegos	Spain	71.53	72.31	72.55	72.55	
16	B	Ákos Hudi	Hungary	71.82	x	72.53	72.53	
17	A	Eivind Henriksen	Norway	70.15	72.30	72.31	72.31	SB
18	A	Siarhei Kalamoyets	Belarus	72.14	x	70.94	72.14	
19	B	Dzmitry Marshyn	Azerbaijan	69.15	x	71.42	71.42	
20	B	Markus Johansson	Sweden	69.21	67.91	67.10	69.21	
21	A	Martin Bingisser	Switzerland	64.37	64.62	64.40	64.62	
	A	Yevhen Vynohradov	Ukraine	x	x	x	NM	

=== Final ===
Rank	Name	Nationality	#1	#2	#3	#4	#5	#6	Result	Notes
1st place, gold medalist(s)	Krisztián Pars	Hungary	78.11	78.45	82.18	78.36	81.69	82.69	82.69	WL
2nd place, silver medalist(s)	Paweł Fajdek	Poland	x	78.48	x	x	82.05	x	82.05	
3rd place, bronze medalist(s)	Sergej Litvinov	Russia	77.33	77.09	x	x	79.35	x	~~79.35~~ DQ (2022)	SB
4	Pavel Kryvitski	Belarus	x	76.48	x	x	78.05	78.50	78.50	
5	Szymon Ziółkowski	Poland	75.71	76.98	x	76.54	77.36	78.41	78.41	SB
6	Primož Kozmus	Slovenia	77.45	77.46	75.46	x	x	x	77.46	SB
7	Marcel Lomnický	Slovakia	73.21	76.23	75.42	76.89	x	x	76.89	
8	David Söderberg	Finland	75.01	76.55	75.87	x	70.88	72.56	76.55	
9	Serghei Marghiev	Moldova	74.33	75.06	75.18				75.18	
10	Pavel Bareisha	Belarus	x	74.73	73.73				74.73	
11	Nicola Vizzoni	Italy	72.75	73.68	73.94				73.94	
12	Tuomas Seppänen	Finland	68.74	73.05	73.70				73.70	
