= Pavel Bareisha =

Belarusian hammer thrower (born 1991)

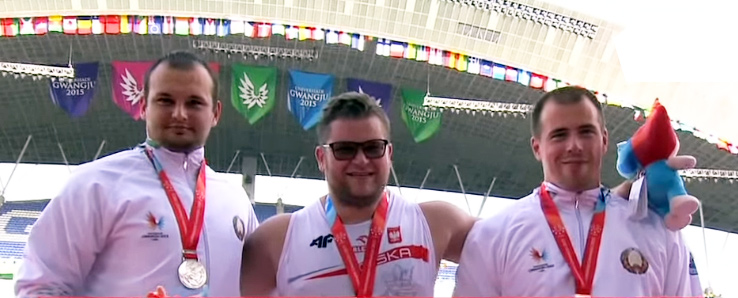
- Pavel Bareisha (left), Pawel Fajdek (centre) and Siarhei Kalamoyets (right), in men's hammer throw final, 28th Summer Universiade (2015) Gwangju, South Korea

Personal information
- Born: 16 February 1991 (age 35)
- Education: Hrodna State University
- Height: 1.93 m (6 ft 4 in)
- Weight: 120 kg (265 lb)

Sport
- Country: Belarus
- Sport: Track and field
- Event: Hammer throw

Pavel Henadzevich Bareisha (Belarusian: Павел Генадзевіч Барэйша; born 16 February 1991) is a Belarusian athlete whose specialty is the hammer throw. He competed at the 2015 World Championships in Beijing without qualifying for the final. In addition, he won the silver medal at the 2015 Summer Universiade. His personal best in the event is 77.03 metres set in Jablonec nad Nisou in 2015.

== Competition record ==
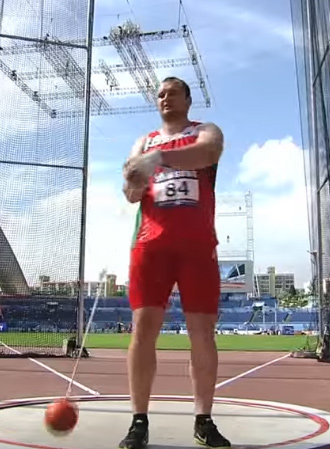
Pavel Bareisha in men's hammer throw final, 28th Summer Universiade (2015)

Year	Competition	Venue	Position	Event	Notes
Representing Belarus
2010	World Junior Championships	Moncton, Canada	6th	Hammer throw (6 kg)	73.23 m
2011	European U23 Championships	Ostrava, Czech Republic	17th (q)	Hammer throw	65.41 m
2014	European Championships	Zürich, Switzerland	10th	Hammer throw	74.73 m
2015	Universiade	Gwangju, South Korea	2nd	Hammer throw	75.75 m
2015	World Championships	Beijing, China	25th (q)	Hammer throw	71.41 m
2016	European Championships	Amsterdam, Netherlands	14th (q)	Hammer throw	72.19 m
2016	Olympic Games	Rio de Janeiro, Brazil	13th (q)	Hammer throw	73.33 m
2017	World Championships	London, United Kingdom	9th	Hammer throw	75.86 m
2017	Universiade	Taipei, Taiwan	2nd	Hammer throw	77.98 m
2018	European Championships	Berlin, Germany	4th	Hammer throw	77.02 m
