= Serghei Marghiev =

Moldovan hammer thrower (born 1992)

Personal information
- Born: 6 November 1992 (age 33) Vladikavkaz, Russia
- Height: 1.95 m (6 ft 5 in)
- Weight: 93 kg (205 lb)

Sport
- Country: Moldova
- Sport: Athletics
- Event: Hammer throw
- Coached by: Soslan Marghiev
- Updated on 14 August 2012

Serghei Marghiev (Russian: Маргиев, Сергей Сосланович; born 6 November 1992) is a Moldovan athlete specialising in the hammer throw. He competed for Moldova at the 2012 Summer Olympics.

Born in Russia, he is the younger brother of fellow hammer throwers, Zalina Marghieva and Marina Nikişenko.

In March 2026, Marghiev was issued with a provisional suspension from competition by the Athletics Integrity Unit after testing positive for dehydrochloromethyltestosterone.

== Competition record ==
Year	Competition	Venue	Position	Event	Notes
Representing Moldova
2009	World Youth Championships	Brixen, Italy	28th (q)	Hammer throw (6 kg)	59.36 m
2010	World Junior Championships	Moncton, Canada	14th (q)	Hammer throw (6 kg)	66.56 m
2011	European Junior Championships	Tallinn, Estonia	2nd	Hammer throw (6 kg)	76.60 m
2012	Olympic Games	London, United Kingdom	31st (q)	Hammer throw	69.76 m
2013	European Cup Winter Throwing (U23)	Castellón, Spain	3rd	Hammer throw	69.72 m
2013	Universiade	Kazan, Russia	8th	Hammer throw	72.99 m
2013	European U23 Championships	Tampere, Finland	5th	Hammer throw	72.08 m
2014	European Championships	Zürich, Switzerland	9th	Hammer throw	75.18 m
2015	Universiade	Gwangju, South Korea	4th	Hammer throw	73.65 m
2015	World Championships	Beijing, China	23rd (q)	Hammer throw	71.61 m
2016	European Championships	Amsterdam, Netherlands	8th	Hammer throw	73.21 m
2016	Olympic Games	Rio de Janeiro, Brazil	10th	Hammer throw	74.14 m
2017	World Championships	London, United Kingdom	8th	Hammer throw	75.87 m
2017	Universiade	Taipei, Taiwan	3rd	Hammer throw	74.98 m
2018	European Championships	Berlin, Germany	8th	Hammer throw	74.47 m
2019	World Championships	Doha, Qatar	16th (q)	Hammer throw	74.28 m
2021	Olympic Games	Tokyo, Japan	12th	Hammer throw	75.24 m
2022	Championships of the Small States of Europe	Marsa, Malta	1st	Hammer throw	74.17 m
2022	World Championships	Eugene, United States	15th (q)	Hammer throw	74.17 m
2022	European Championships	Munich, Germany	10th	Hammer throw	73.89 m
2023	World Championships	Budapest, Hungary	18th (q)	Hammer throw	72.91 m
2024	European Championships	Rome, Italy	11th	Hammer throw	73.07 m
2024	Olympic Games	Paris, France	18th (q)	Hammer throw	73.46 m
