= Simone Falloni =

Italian hammer thrower

Personal information
- National team: Italy
- Born: 26 July 1991 (age 34) San Cesareo, Italy
- Height: 1.90 m (6 ft 3 in)
- Weight: 108 kg (238 lb)

Sport
- Sport: Athletics
- Event: Hammer throw
- Club: Libertas San Cesareo (2004–2006); Studentesca Cariri (2007–2011); C.S. Aeronautica Militare (2012–)
- Coached by: Valter Rizzi; Gino Brichese; Nicola Vizzoni (2017–2020); Federico Apolloni (2021- )

Achievements and titles
- Personal best: Hammer throw: 76.33 m (2021)

Simone Falloni (born 26 July 1991 in San Cesareo) is an Italian athlete specialising in the hammer throw.

== Career ==
He represented his country at the 2017 World Championships without qualifying for the final. His biggest success to date is the bronze medal at the 2017 European Throwing Cup.

His personal best in the event is 76.33 m set in Rieti in 2021.

== Achievements ==
Year	Competition	Venue	Position	Event	Notes
Representing Italy
2009	European Junior Championships	Novi Sad, Serbia	24th (q)	Hammer throw (6 kg)	61.55 m
2010	World Junior Championships	Moncton, Canada	22nd (q)	Hammer throw (6 kg)	64.49 m
2011	European U23 Championships	Ostrava, Czech Republic	16th (q)	Hammer throw	65.43 m
2013	European U23 Championships	Tampere, Finland	4th	Hammer throw	72.43 m
2015	Universiade	Gwangju, South Korea	8th	Hammer throw	70.58 m
2016	European Championships	Amsterdam, Netherlands	18th (q)	Hammer throw	70.51 m
2017	European Throwing Cup	Las Palmas, Spain	3rd	Hammer throw	74.37 m
2017	World Championships	London, United Kingdom	30th (q)	Hammer throw	69.90 m
2018	European Championships	Berlin, Germany	21st (q)	Hammer throw	71.03 m
