= Pezhman Ghalehnoei =

Iranian hammer thrower (born 1992)

Pezhman Ghalehnoei (born January 29, 1992) is an Iranian hammer thrower. He competed at the 2016 Summer Olympics in the men's hammer throw event; his mark of 69.15 meters in the qualifying round did not qualify him for the final.
