= Siarhei Kalamoyets =

Belarusian hammer thrower

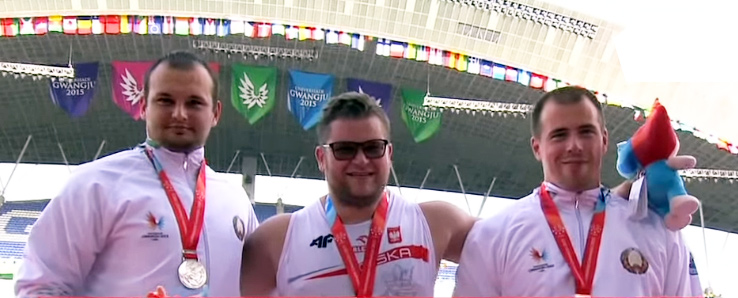
- Pavel Bareisha (left), Pawel Fajdek (centre) and Siarhei Kalamoyets (right), in men's hammer throw final, 28th Summer Universiade (2015) Gwangju, South Korea

Personal information
- Nationality: Belarusian
- Born: 11 August 1989 (age 36) Grodno, Byelorussian SSR, Soviet Union
- Education: Vitebsk State Technological University
- Height: 1.92 m (6 ft 4 in)
- Weight: 115 kg (254 lb)

Sport
- Sport: Track and field
- Event: Hammer throw

Siarhei Viktaravich Kalamoyets (Belarusian: Сяргей Віктаравіч Каламоец; born 11 August 1989) is a Belarusian athlete specialising in the hammer throw. He won the bronze medal at the 2015 Summer Universiade. His personal best in the event is 77.52 metres set in Minsk in 2011.

== Competition record ==
Year	Competition	Venue	Position	Event	Notes
Representing Belarus
2008	World Junior Championships	Bydgoszcz, Poland	5th	Hammer throw (6 kg)	74.22 m
2009	European U23 Championships	Kaunas, Lithuania	11th	Hammer throw	65.62 m
2011	European U23 Championships	Ostrava, Czech Republic	6th	Hammer throw	71.84 m
2011	Universiade	Shenzhen, China	4th	Hammer throw	72.23 m
2013	Universiade	Kazan, Russia	6th	Hammer throw	74.18 m
2014	European Championships	Zürich, Switzerland	18th (q)	Hammer throw	72.14 m
2015	Universiade	Gwangju, South Korea	3rd	Hammer throw	74.68 m
2016	European Championships	Amsterdam, Netherlands	6th	Hammer throw	74.65 m
2016	Olympic Games	Rio de Janeiro, Brazil	9th	Hammer throw	74.22 m
2017	World Championships	London, United Kingdom	22nd (q)	Hammer throw	71.90 m
