= Ákos Hudi =

Hungarian hammer thrower

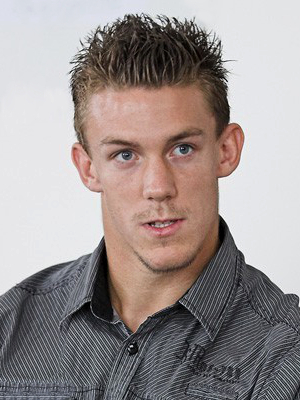
Ákos Hudi

Ákos Hudi (born 10 August 1991) is a Hungarian athlete specialising in the hammer throw. He won several medals in younger age categories including the silver at the 2010 World Junior Championships. In addition, he competed at the 2013 World Championships without qualifying for the final.

His personal best in the event is 76.93 metres set in 2013 in Budapest.

== Competition record ==
Year	Competition	Venue	Position	Event	Notes
Representing Hungary
2007	European Junior Championships	Hengelo, Netherlands	17th (q)	Hammer throw (6 kg)	65.19 m
2008	World Junior Championships	Bydgoszcz, Poland	7th	Hammer throw (6 kg)	73.31 m
2009	European Junior Championships	Novi Sad, Serbia	2nd	Hammer throw (6 kg)	79.14 m
2010	World Junior Championships	Moncton, Canada	2nd	Hammer throw (6 kg)	78.37 m
2011	European U23 Championships	Ostrava, Czech Republic	8th	Hammer throw	70.75 m
2013	European U23 Championships	Tampere, Finland	2nd	Hammer throw	74.06 m
2013	World Championships	Moscow, Russia	15th (q)	Hammer throw	74.30 m
2014	European Championships	Zürich, Switzerland	16th (q)	Hammer throw	72.53 m
2015	World Championships	Beijing, China	27th (q)	Hammer throw	71.15 m
2016	European Championships	Amsterdam, Netherlands	21st (q)	Hammer throw	70.37 m
