= Hassan Mohamed Mahmoud =

Egyptian hammer thrower (born 1984)

Hassan Mohamed Mahmoud (born February 10, 1984) is an Egyptian hammer thrower. He competed at the 2016 Summer Olympics in the men's hammer throw event; his result of 69.87 metres in the qualifying round did not qualify him for the final.
