= Aleksandr Dryhol =

Ukrainian-born Israeli hammer thrower

Personal information
- Born: 25 April 1966 (age 60) Ukrainian SSR, Soviet Union
- Height: 1.83 m (6 ft 0 in)
- Weight: 104 kg (229 lb)

Sport
- Country: Israel formerly Ukraine and Soviet Union
- Sport: Athletics
- Event: Hammer throw
- Updated on 14 August 2012

Aleksandr Dryhol (sometimes spelled Oleksandr Dryhol and Oleksandr Drygol; born 25 April 1966) is a Ukrainian-born Israeli, formerly Ukrainian and Soviet track and field athlete primarily known for the Hammer throw. He was selected to compete for Ukraine in the 2012 Summer Olympics, his first Olympic selection at the age of 46. He is the current world record holder in the M45 division of masters athletics at 79.42 m. In 2016, at the age of 50, he switched his country of eligibility to Israel, where he had been living for several years. On 1 June, with a 77.70 m (254 ft 11 in) throw in Jablonec nad Nisou, he qualified for the Olympics again. At that point in time he was the #7 thrower in the world that year. For the second time, he would have been the oldest competitor in Athletics competition at the Olympics. His throw does not count as a Masters M50 world record because the implement he throws for open competition is 1.26 kg heavier than the normal implement for the M50 age group. His throw was almost 6 meters further than Jud Logan's record with the lighter implement. He is the last remaining active athlete to have competed for the Soviet Union.

In November 2016 it was announced retests of the samples taken from the 2012 Olympics indicated that Dryhol had tested positive for prohibited substances. The IOC Disciplinary Commission disqualified Dryhol from the Olympic Games 2012.

== Biography ==
He achieved the selection as the top hammer thrower from the highly competitive country of Ukraine during the 2012 season that saw him improve his personal best in the event out to 79.42 m at a meet in Jablonec, Czech Republic, four days after his 46th birthday. At the time, it had been the #2 throw in the world that year. His previous personal best of 77.86 m was set almost 22 years earlier in 1990, when he was the 22nd ranked hammer thrower in the world while competing for the Soviet Union. That mark improved his standing world record in the age group by over 4 metres (13 feet). This was not a fluke throw, throughout the 2012 season Dryhol had several competitions beyond the 77 meter range. Throughout the 2011 season, Dryhol was also a top ranked hammer thrower, peaking at the 75.27, but gave up his spot to compete in the 2011 IAAF World Championships to Andriy Martynyuk, the 2009 European Junior Champion who was born 15 days after Dryhol had set his personal best to that time.

== See also ==
- List of Israeli records in athletics
