= Amanmyrat Hommadow =

Turkmenistani hammer thrower

Amanmurad Hommadov
Personal information
- Nationality: Turkmenistan
- Born: 28 January 1989 (age 37) Tejen, Turkmenistan, Soviet Union
- Height: 1.86 m (6 ft 1 in)
- Weight: 100 kg (220 lb)

Sport
- Sport: Athletics
- Event: Hammer throw

Achievements and titles
- Personal best: Hammer throw: 69.15 m (2011)

Amanmurad Hommadov (Turkmen: Amanmyrat Hommadow; born January 28, 1989) is a Turkmenistani hammer thrower. Hommadov represented Turkmenistan at the 2008 Summer Olympics in Beijing, where he competed for the men's hammer throw. He received no mark in the qualifying round, after failing to throw the hammer at a specific distance in three successive attempts.

Hommadov threw his personal best of 69.15 metres at a national meet in Ashgabat.
