= Denis Lukyanov =

Russian hammer thrower

Personal information
- Full name: Denis Igorevich Lukyanov
- Born: 14 July 1989 (age 36)

Sport
- Country: Russia
- Sport: Men's athletics
- Event: Hammer throw

Achievements and titles
- Personal best: 79.61 (2013)
Medal record
Men's hammer throw
Representing Russia
Military World Games
Bronze medal – third place	2019 Wuhan	Hammer throw

Denis Igorevich Lukyanov (Russian: Денис Игоревич Лукьянов; born 14 July 1989) is a Russian athletics competitor competing in the hammer throw. In 2019, he competed in the men's hammer throw at the 2019 World Athletics Championships held in Doha, Qatar. He did not qualify to compete in the final.

In 2015, he competed in the men's hammer throw at the 2015 Summer Universiade held in Gwangju, South Korea. He finished in 5th place.

In 2019, he represented Europe in The Match Europe v USA where he finished in 6th place in the men's hammer throw event. He won the bronze medal in the men's hammer throw at the 2019 Military World Games held in Wuhan, China.
