= Eivind Henriksen =

Norwegian hammer thrower (born 1990)

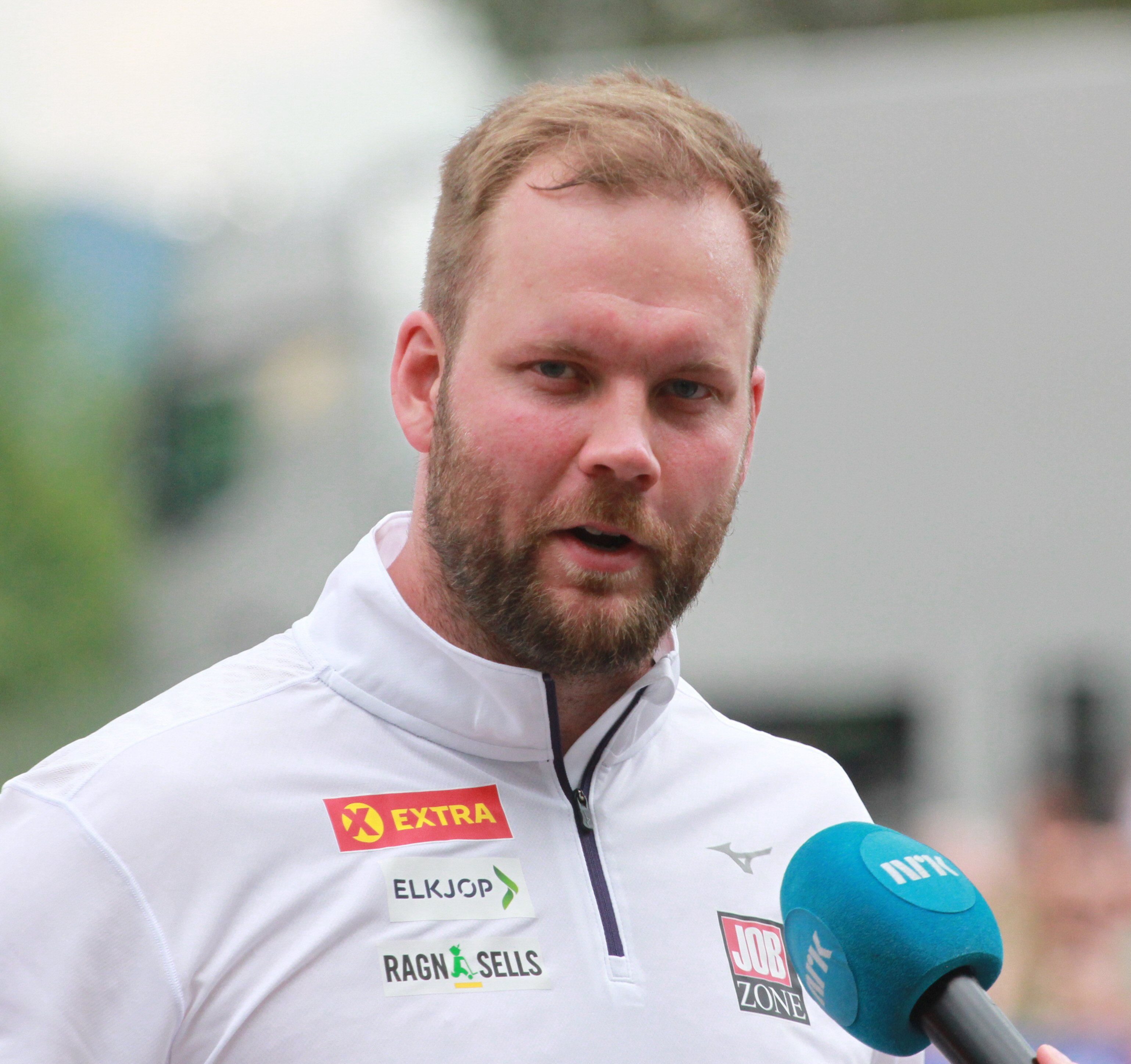
- Henriksen in 2022

Personal information
- Born: 14 September 1990 (age 35) Oslo, Norway

Sport
- Country: Norway
- Sport: Athletics
- Event: Hammer throw

Achievements and titles
- Personal bests: 81.58 m NR
Medal record
Men's athletics
Representing Norway
Olympic Games
Silver medal – second place	2020 Tokyo	Hammer throw
World Championships
Bronze medal – third place	2022 Eugene	Hammer throw
European Championships
Bronze medal – third place	2022 Munich	Hammer throw
- Updated on 18 August 2022

Eivind Henriksen (born 14 September 1990) is a Norwegian athlete competing in hammer throw. He is a three-time Olympian and won the silver medal in the men's hammer throw event at the 2020 Summer Olympics. Henriksen is also a World Championships and European Championships bronze medalist, and a thirteen-time Norwegian champion in hammer throw.

== Career ==
Henriksen made his Olympic debut at the 2012 Summer Olympics in London. He placed fifth at the 2018 European Championships and sixth at the 2019 World Championships. Henriksen won the silver medal in the men's hammer throw event at the 2020 Summer Olympics in Tokyo, while also setting a new Norwegian record in the event at 81.58 metres.

Henriksen won bronze medals in the hammer throw events at the 2022 World Championships and the 2022 European Championships. He competed in the men's hammer throw event at the 2024 Summer Olympics in Paris, placing fourth in the event.

In September 2025 he qualified for the hammer throw final at the 2025 World Athletics Championships in Tokyo, and placed ninth in the final.

== Personal life ==
Henriksen was born in Oslo on 14 September 1990.

== Competition record ==
Year	Competition	Venue	Position	Event	Notes
Representing Norway
2007	World Youth Championships	Ostrava, Czech Republic	9th	Hammer (5 kg)	71.10 m
2007	European Junior Championships	Hengelo, Netherlands	22nd (q)	Hammer (6 kg)	61.48 m
2008	World Junior Championships	Bydgoszcz, Poland	–	Hammer (6 kg)	NM
2009	European Junior Championships	Novi Sad, Serbia	4th	Hammer (6 kg)	76.65 m
2010	European Championships	Barcelona, Spain	22nd (q)	Hammer	69.98 m
2011	European Cup Winter Throwing (U23)	Sofia, Bulgaria	2nd	Hammer	72.37 m
2011	European U23 Championships	Ostrava, Czech Republic	12th	Hammer	69.89 m
2011	World Championships	Daegu, South Korea	24th (q)	Hammer	71.27 m
2012	European Championships	Helsinki, Finland	14th (q)	Hammer	72.54 m
2012	Olympic Games	London, United Kingdom	13th (q)	Hammer	74.62 m
2014	European Championships	Zürich, Switzerland	17th (q)	Hammer	72.31 m
2015	Universiade	Gwangju, South Korea	6th	Hammer	71.47 m
2016	European Championships	Amsterdam, Netherlands	16th (q)	Hammer	71.93 m
2018	European Championships	Berlin, Germany	5th	Hammer	76.86 m NR
2019	World Championships	Doha, Qatar	6th	Hammer	77.38 m
2021	Olympic Games	Tokyo, Japan	2nd	Hammer	81.58 m NR
2022	World Championships	Eugene, United States	3rd	Hammer	80.87 m
2022	European Championships	Munich, Germany	3rd	Hammer	79.45 m
2023	World Championships	Budapest, Hungary	7th	Hammer	77.06 m
2024	European Championships	Rome, Italy	7th	Hammer	76.51 m
2024	Olympic Games	Paris, France	4th	Hammer	79.18 m
2025	World Championships	Tokyo, Japan	9th	Hammer	76.47 m
2026	European Championships	Birmingham, United Kingdom	19th (q)	Hammer	72.06 m
