= Conor McCullough =

American hammer thrower (born 1991)

Personal information
- Full name: Conor Michael McCullough
- Born: 31 January 1991 (age 35) Woodland Hills, Los Angeles, United States

Sport
- Sport: Track and field
- Event: Hammer throw
Medal record
Representing the United States
World Junior Championships
Gold medal – first place	2010 Moncton	Hammer throw
Silver medal – second place	2008 Bydgoszcz	Hammer throw
Pan American Games
Bronze medal – third place	2015 Toronto	Hammer throw

Conor Michael McCullough (born January 31, 1991) is an American hammer thrower. He is a two-time medalist (one gold, one silver) at the World Junior Championships. While competing for Chaminade College Preparatory School he set the US high school record at four contested hammer weights - 11 lb (263' 9"), 12 lb (260' 0"), 13.2 lb (248' 11") and 16 lb (219' 7"). He also set the record in the Indoor Weight Throw at 93' 3¼". He set his personal best 78.12 m (256 ft 3 in) using the senior implement on his final throw while winning the 2019 USA Outdoor Track and Field Championships.

== Career ==
At the 2008 World Junior Championships in Athletics, McCullough won a silver medal behind compatriot Walter Henning in a personal best throw of 75.88 m (with a six-kilogram ball). Two years later, after competing for Princeton University, at the 2010 World Junior Championships in Athletics, McCullough won gold with a distance of 80.79 m, a national junior and championship record. In 2012 McCullough qualified for the Olympic Trials; there he finished just out of the medals with a throw of 73.55, leaving him in the fourth place position.

His father, Connor McCullagh, competed in the hammer throw for Ireland and was in the 1984 and 1988 Olympics.

USC's Conor McCullough was granted a sixth year of eligibility by the NCAA and competed in both the indoor season, finishing second in the weight throw at the 2015 NCAA Division I Indoor Track and Field Championships and the outdoor season, winning the 2015 NCAA Division I Outdoor Track and Field Championships. McCullough began his career at Princeton University and enrolled at USC in 2014. He was hammer runner up in 76.09m (249-7) at 2015 USA Outdoor Track and Field Championships. At the 2015 World Championships he was the top American, finishing the qualifying round in 13th place, just missing making the final by .20 m (7 3/4 in). In 2016 McCullough competed in the Olympic Games and again finished as the top american with a 16th place finish.

== Personal bests ==
Event	Best (m)	Venue	Date
Hammer throw	75.09	Lucerne, Switzerland	2012
Hammer throw	78.14	Des Moines, Iowa	2019
