= Andriy Martynyuk =

Ukrainian hammer thrower

Personal information
- Born: 23 September 1990 (age 35)

Sport
- Country: Ukraine
- Sport: Athletics
- Event: Hammer throw

Achievements and titles
- Personal best: Hammer throw: 77.70 m (2012)
Medal record
Men's athletics
Representing Ukraine
World Youth Championships
| Gold medal – first place | 2007 Ostrava | Hammer throw |
European Cup Winter Throwing (U23)
| Silver medal – second place | 2010 Arles | Hammer throw |
| Silver medal – second place | 2012 Bar | Hammer throw |
| Bronze medal – third place | 2011 Sofia | Hammer throw |
European Junior Championships
| Gold medal – first place | 2009 Novi Sad | Hammer throw |

Andriy Martynyuk (born 23 September 1990) is a Ukrainian male hammer thrower, who won an individual gold medal at the Youth World Championships.
