= Athletics at the 2014 Asian Games – Men's hammer throw =

Men's hammer throw at the 2014 Asian Games
- Venue: Incheon Asiad Main Stadium
- Dates: 27 September 2014
- Competitors: 12 from 10 nations

Medalists
gold medal	Dilshod Nazarov	Tajikistan
silver medal	Wang Shizhu	China
bronze medal	Wan Yong	China

The men's hammer throw event at the 2014 Asian Games was held at the Incheon Asiad Main Stadium, Incheon, South Korea on 27 September.

== Schedule ==
All times are Korea Standard Time (UTC+09:00)

Date	Time	Event
Saturday, 27 September 2014	18:50	Final

== Records ==
Prior to this competition, the existing world, Asian and Games records were as follows.

World Record	Yuriy Sedykh (URS)	86.74	Stuttgart, West Germany	30 August 1986
Asian Record	Koji Murofushi (JPN)	84.86	Prague, Czech Republic	29 June 2003
Games Record	Koji Murofushi (JPN)	78.72	Busan, South Korea	8 October 2002

== Results ==
Legend

- NM — No mark

Rank	Athlete	Attempt						Result	Notes
Rank	Athlete	1	2	3	4	5	6	Result	Notes
1st place, gold medalist(s)	Dilshod Nazarov (TJK)	73.27	73.81	76.49	76.82	76.32	76.14	76.82	
2nd place, silver medalist(s)	Wang Shizhu (CHN)	72.84	72.54	70.76	73.65	72.18	73.30	73.65	
3rd place, bronze medalist(s)	Wan Yong (CHN)	X	73.43	73.33	72.92	73.39	X	73.43	
4	Ali Al-Zenkawi (KUW)	69.32	72.88	X	X	69.66	X	72.88	
5	Suhrob Khodjaev (UZB)	X	68.39	70.28	69.72	71.43	70.19	71.43	
6	Lee Yun-chul (KOR)	68.88	X	70.36	69.47	X	69.07	70.36	
7	Mergen Mämmedow (TKM)	66.50	X	66.95	68.68	68.01	68.03	68.68	
8	Chandrodaya Narayan Singh (IND)	65.67	X	65.86	X	66.98	X	66.98	
9	Tantipong Phetchaiya (THA)	57.60	57.14	58.32				58.32	
—	Ashraf Amgad El-Seify (QAT)	X	X	X				NM	
—	Reza Moghaddam (IRI)	X	X	X				NM	
—	Kaveh Mousavi (IRI)	X	X	X				NM	
