= Athletics at the 2026 Asian Games – Men's hammer throw =

Men's hammer throw at the 2026 Asian Games
- Venue: Mizuho Park Athletic Stadium, Nagoya
- Date: 25 September 2026
- Competitors: 15 from 11 nations
- Winning distance: 74.38 m

Medalists
gold medal	Sukhrob Khodjaev	Uzbekistan
silver medal	Shota Fukuda	Japan
bronze medal	Mohammed Aldubaisi	Saudi Arabia

The men's hammer throw competition at the 2026 Asian Games took place on 25 September 2026 at the Mizuho Park Athletic Stadium in Nagoya, Japan. Sukhrob Khodjaev of Uzbekistan won the gold medal with a throw of 74.38 metres (244.0 ft), while Shota Fukuda of Japan and Mohammed Aldubaisi of Saudi Arabia won the silver and bronze medals respectively.

== Schedule ==
All times are Japan Standard Time (UTC+09:00)

Schedule
Date	Time	Event
25 September 2026	17:10	Final

== Records ==
Prior to this competition, the existing world, Asian and Games records were as follows.

World Record	Yuriy Sedykh (URS)	86.74	Stuttgart, West Germany	29 August 1986
Asian Record	Koji Murofushi (JPN)	84.86	Prague, Czech Republic	28 June 2003
Games Record	Koji Murofushi (JPN)	78.72	Busan, South Korea	7 October 2002

== Results ==
Rank	Athlete	Attempt						Result	Notes
Rank	Athlete	1	2	3	4	5	6	Result	Notes
1st place, gold medalist(s)	Sukhrob Khodjaev (UZB)	70.92	74.38	72.76	71.36	68.87	70.91	74.38	
2nd place, silver medalist(s)	Shota Fukuda (JPN)	69.09	70.45	X	66.82	71.78	68.85	71.78	
3rd place, bronze medalist(s)	Mohammed Aldubaisi (KSA)	X	70.38	52.97	71.43	69.86	71.53	71.53	
4	Tatsuto Nakagawa (JPN)	69.70	X	X	71.48	70.29	70.06	71.48	
5	Ashraf Elseify (QAT)	69.97	68.69	69.48	69.97	70.29	71.41	71.41	SB
6	Wang Qi (CHN)	69.71	69.68	70.80	70.93	70.61	70.36	70.93	
7	Ayyubkhon Fayozov (UZB)	X	69.25	X	X	X	69.01	69.25	
8	Lee Ywun-chul (KOR)	65.50	64.43	68.10	67.44	68.35	67.99	68.35	
9	Damneet Singh (IND)	67.56	67.30	65.42				67.56	
10	Mubeen Al Kindi (OMA)	63.96	66.53	65.87				66.53	
11	Praveen Kumar (IND)	65.24	64.30	64.74				65.24	
12	Talal Alrushoud (KUW)	64.65	63.29	63.69				64.65	
13	Abdelrahman Ibrahim (QAT)	62.83	63.89	X				63.89	
14	Sadat Marzuqi Ajisan (MAS)	62.58	X	X				62.58	
15	Kittipong Boonmawan (THA)	59.19	60.34	60.55				60.55	
