= Athletics at the 2018 Asian Games – Men's hammer throw =

Asian Games athletics event

Men's hammer throw at the 2018 Asian Games
- Venue: Gelora Bung Karno Stadium
- Date: 26 August 2018
- Competitors: 14 from 10 nations

Medalists
gold medal	Ashraf Amgad El-Seify	Qatar
silver medal	Dilshod Nazarov	Tajikistan
bronze medal	Suhrob Khodjaev	Uzbekistan

The men's hammer throw competition at the 2018 Asian Games took place on 26 August 2018 at the Gelora Bung Karno Stadium.

== Schedule ==
All times are Western Indonesia Time (UTC+07:00)

Date	Time	Event
Sunday, 26 August 2018	20:35	Final

== Records ==
Prior to this competition, the existing world, Asian and Games records were as follows.

World Record	Yuriy Sedykh (URS)	86.74	Stuttgart, West Germany	30 August 1986
Asian Record	Koji Murofushi (JPN)	84.86	Prague, Czech Republic	29 June 2003
Games Record	Koji Murofushi (JPN)	78.72	Busan, South Korea	8 October 2002

== Results ==
Legend

- NM — No mark

Rank	Athlete	Attempt						Result	Notes
Rank	Athlete	1	2	3	4	5	6	Result	Notes
1st place, gold medalist(s)	Ashraf Amgad El-Seify (QAT)	X	70.12	75.61	76.57	76.88	74.56	76.88	
2nd place, silver medalist(s)	Dilshod Nazarov (TJK)	72.99	X	74.16	73.57	X	X	74.16	
3rd place, bronze medalist(s)	Suhrob Khodjaev (UZB)	70.24	72.41	74.06	74.03	72.16	X	74.06	
4	Wang Shizhu (CHN)	X	66.36	70.87	70.22	71.31	71.00	71.31	
5	Lee Yun-chul (KOR)	68.71	68.95	67.72	69.19	71.10	67.71	71.10	
6	Qi Dakai (CHN)	X	64.89	63.53	65.00	65.70	66.81	66.81	
7	Jackie Wong (MAS)	64.28	X	65.92	64.01	62.76	63.88	65.92	
8	Ahmed Amgad El-Seify (QAT)	64.60	64.80	63.28	65.33	64.28	63.76	65.33	
9	Reza Moghaddam (IRI)	64.67	X	X				64.67	
10	Kittipong Boonmawan (THA)	62.88	63.29	63.38				63.38	
11	Abdurauf Musoev (TJK)	57.98	58.54	58.95				58.95	
12	Rafika Putra (INA)	49.83	X	X				49.83	
—	Mergen Mämmedow (TKM)	X	X	X				NM	
—	Denny Yohannes Sianturi (INA)	X	X	X				NM	
