= 2019 Asian Athletics Championships – Men's hammer throw =

Men's hammer throw at the 2019 Asian Athletics Championships
- Venue: Khalifa International Stadium
- Location: Doha, Qatar
- Dates: 23 April (qualification); 24 April (final)
- Competitors: 17 from 11 nations
- Winning distance: 76.14 m

Medalists
gold medal	Dilshod Nazarov	Tajikistan
silver medal	Ashraf Amgad El-Seify	Qatar
bronze medal	Suhrob Khodjaev	Uzbekistan

The men's hammer throw at the 2019 Asian Athletics Championships was held on 23 and 24 April.

== Records ==
Records before the 2019 Asian Athletics Championships
Record	Athlete (nation)	Distance (m)	Location	Date
World record	Yuriy Sedykh (URS)	86.74	Stuttgart, West Germany	30 August 1986
Asian record	Koji Murofushi (JPN)	84.86	Prague, Czech Republic	29 June 2003
Championship record	Koji Murofushi (JPN)	80.45	Colombo, Sri Lanka	10 August 2002
World leading	Denis Lukyanov (ANA)	78.97	Sochi, Russia	21 February 2019
Asian leading	Ashraf El-Seify (QAT)	74.44	Doha, Qatar	7 April 2019

== Results ==
=== Qualification ===
Qualification rule: Qualifying performance 70.00 (Q) or at least 12 best performers (q) qualify for the final

Rank	Name	Nationality	#1	#2	#3	Result	Notes
1	Ashraf Amgad El-Seify	Qatar	69.10	69.81	74.92	74.92	Q, SB
2	Dilshod Nazarov	Tajikistan	71.46			71.46	Q, SB
3	Lee Yun-chul	South Korea	66.94	68.79	69.67	69.67	q
4	Mergen Mämmedow	Turkmenistan	67.31	69.62	–	69.62	q, SB
5	Suhrob Khodjaev	Uzbekistan	69.62	–	–	69.62	q
6	Wang Shizhu	China	68.21	68.14	67.29	68.21	q
7	Ali Al-Zinkawi	Kuwait	x	68.20	–	68.20	q
8	Guo Kun	China	65.11	66.81	x	66.81	q
9	Ahmed El-Sify	Qatar	64.18	65.54	64.41	65.54	q, SB
10	Jackie Wong Siew Cheer	Malaysia	63.84	64.83	65.33	65.33	q
11	Kunihiro Sumi	Japan	64.22	65.28	x	65.28	q
12	Amanmyrat Hommadow	Turkmenistan	58.12	58.79	63.41	63.41	q, SB
13	Kittipong Boonmawan	Thailand	62.74	60.96	61.31	62.74	SB
14	Khalil Bedoui	Qatar	59.98	x	x	59.98	
15	Yudai Kimura	Japan	x	59.62	x	59.62	
16	Rashed Al-Failkawi	Kuwait	53.53	58.21	x	58.21	
	Mahmood Al-Gohary	Bahrain	x	x	x	NM	

=== Final ===
Rank	Name	Nationality	#1	#2	#3	#4	#5	#6	Result	Notes
1st place, gold medalist(s)	Dilshod Nazarov	Tajikistan	72.31	70.91	72.65	73.28	76.14	75.86	76.14	SB
2nd place, silver medalist(s)	Ashraf Amgad El-Seify	Qatar	72.55	73.27	x	73.06	71.30	73.76	73.76	
3rd place, bronze medalist(s)	Suhrob Khodjaev	Uzbekistan	x	71.28	71.86	72.85	72.80	72.39	72.85	
4	Ali Al-Zinkawi	Kuwait	x	70.91	x	x	x	x	70.91	
5	Lee Yun-chul	South Korea	66.52	67.09	69.19	69.81	69.71	67.06	69.81	
6	Wang Shizhu	China	68.89	67.31	67.56	67.06	68.58	68.26	68.89	
7	Guo Kun	China	x	66.34	65.76	67.01	66.86	x	67.01	
8	Jackie Wong Siew Cheer	Malaysia	63.48	65.70	67.01	x	65.65	66.40	67.01	NR
9	Kunihiro Sumi	Japan	64.93	64.06	65.86				65.86	
10	Ahmed El-Sify	Qatar	65.08	63.86	61.93				65.08	
11	Amanmyrat Hommadow	Turkmenistan	61.67	61.59	60.45				61.67	
	Mergen Mämmedow	Turkmenistan	x	x	x				NM	
