= Athletics at the 2022 Asian Games – Men's hammer throw =

Men's hammer throw at the 2022 Asian Games
- Venue: Hangzhou Olympic Expo Main Stadium
- Date: 30 September 2023
- Competitors: 13 from 10 nations

Medalists
gold medal	Wang Qi	China
silver medal	Ashraf Amgad El-Seify	Qatar
bronze medal	Suhrob Khodjaev	Uzbekistan

The men's hammer throw competition at the 2022 Asian Games took place on 30 September 2023 at the HOC Stadium, Hangzhou.

== Schedule ==
All times are China Standard Time (UTC+08:00)

Date	Time	Event
Saturday, 30 September 2023	19:00	Final

== Records ==
Prior to this competition, the existing world, Asian and Games records were as follows.

World Record	Yuriy Sedykh (URS)	86.74	Stuttgart, West Germany	30 August 1986
Asian Record	Koji Murofushi (JPN)	84.86	Prague, Czech Republic	29 June 2003
Games Record	Koji Murofushi (JPN)	78.72	Busan, South Korea	8 October 2002

== Results ==
Rank	Athlete	Attempt						Result	Notes
Rank	Athlete	1	2	3	4	5	6	Result	Notes
1st place, gold medalist(s)	Wang Qi (CHN)	70.83	72.03	72.34	72.74	72.97	71.75	72.97	
2nd place, silver medalist(s)	Ashraf Amgad El-Seify (QAT)	69.26	72.42	70.20	X	71.67	72.00	72.42	
3rd place, bronze medalist(s)	Suhrob Khodjaev (UZB)	70.79	68.28	67.83	68.25	68.88	66.96	70.79	
4	Ryota Kashimura (JPN)	69.52	70.72	68.31	68.15	70.50	X	70.72	
5	Lee Yun-chul (KOR)	66.62	67.56	68.25	69.12	65.87	67.80	69.12	
6	Shota Fukuda (JPN)	66.69	67.07	68.74	65.57	68.53	67.16	68.74	
7	Ahmed Amgad El-Seify (QAT)	67.85	66.99	65.81	67.86	X	65.74	67.86	
8	Ali Al-Zenkawi (KUW)	64.82	67.57	X	X	X	67.41	67.57	
9	Mergen Mämmedow (TKM)	65.97	66.00	66.93				66.93	
10	Mohammed Al-Dubaisi (KSA)	61.94	65.95	X				65.95	
11	Jackie Wong (MAS)	62.79	X	X				62.79	
12	Mohammed Al-Zayer (KSA)	61.25	62.50	59.34				62.50	
13	Kittipong Boonmawan (THA)	55.20	X	X				55.20	
