= 2025 Asian Athletics Championships – Men's hammer throw =

Men's hammer throw at the 2025 Asian Athletics Championships
- Venue: Gumi Civic Stadium
- Location: Gumi, South Korea
- Dates: 28 May
- Competitors: 16 from 11 nations
- Winning distance: 74.50 m

Medalists
| gold medal | Wang Qi | China |
| silver medal | Tatsuto Nakagawa | Japan |
| bronze medal | Shota Fukuda | Japan |

The men's hammer throw event at the 2025 Asian Athletics Championships was held on 28 May.

== Records ==
Records before the 2025 Asian Athletics Championships
| Record | Athlete (nation) | Distance (m) | Location | Date |
|---|---|---|---|---|
| World record | Yuriy Sedykh (URS) | 86.74 | Stuttgart, West Germany | 30 August 1986 |
| Asian record | Koji Murofushi (JPN) | 84.86 | Prague, Czech Republic | 29 June 2003 |
| Championship record | Koji Murofushi (JPN) | 80.45 | Colombo, Sri Lanka | 10 August 2002 |
| World leading | Yann Chaussinand (FRA) | 81.91 | Zagreb, Croatia | 24 May 2025 |
| Asian leading | Wang Qi (CHN) | 74.44 | Jiaxing, China | 29 April 2025 |

== Schedule ==
The event schedule, in local time (UTC+9), was as follows:

| Date | Time | Round |
|---|---|---|
| 28 May | 12:20 | Final |

== Results ==
| Place | Athlete | Nation | #1 | #2 | #3 | #4 | #5 | #6 | Result | Notes |
|---|---|---|---|---|---|---|---|---|---|---|
| 1st place, gold medalist(s) | Wang Qi | China | 69.80 | 71.05 | 71.92 | 73.02 | 73.68 | 74.50 | 74.50 m | |
| 2nd place, silver medalist(s) | Tatsuto Nakagawa | Japan | 69.25 | 69.87 | 67.28 | 71.00 | 71.76 | 71.97 | 71.97 m | |
| 3rd place, bronze medalist(s) | Shota Fukuda | Japan | 69.79 | 71.89 | x | 70.34 | 69.11 | 70.91 | 71.89 m | PB |
| 4 | Mohammed Al-Dubaisi | Saudi Arabia | x | x | 63.34 | 69.61 | 70.40 | 68.71 | 70.40 m | SB |
| 5 | Ashraf Amgad El-Seify | Qatar | 67.91 | 69.17 | 68.48 | x | x | 69.82 | 69.82 m | |
| 6 | Suhrob Khodjaev | Uzbekistan | 68.66 | x | 68.18 | 68.99 | 68.33 | 69.06 | 69.06 m | |
| 7 | Lee Yun-chul | South Korea | 63.28 | 64.14 | 66.59 | 64.56 | 66.70 | 65.52 | 66.70 m | |
| 8 | Mahdi Haft Cheshmeh | Iran | x | x | 64.68 | 65.30 | x | 64.26 | 65.30 m | |
| 9 | Hussein Al-Bayati | Iraq | 59.94 | 62.93 | 62.54 | | | | 62.93 m | PB |
| 10 | Mergen Mämmedow | Turkmenistan | 62.34 | x | 60.38 | | | | 62.34 m | |
| 11 | Kang Min-seung | South Korea | 61.86 | 61.61 | 59.94 | | | | 61.86 m | SB |
| 12 | Kittipong Boonmawan | Thailand | 61.13 | 61.48 | 61.81 | | | | 61.81 m | SB |
| 13 | Ali Al-Zenkawi | Kuwait | 61.76 | x | x | | | | 61.76 m | |
| 14 | Yousef ben Rajab | Kuwait | 60.53 | x | x | | | | 60.53 m | |
| 15 | Amanmyrat Hommadow | Turkmenistan | 57.37 | x | 60.29 | | | | 60.29 m | |
| 16 | Aws Basim Alaithan | Saudi Arabia | 59.10 | x | 54.22 | | | | 59.10 m | |
