= Athletics at the 2010 Asian Games – Men's hammer throw =

Men's hammer throw at the 2010 Asian Games
- Venue: Aoti Main Stadium
- Date: 21 November 2010
- Competitors: 12 from 9 nations

Medalists
gold medal	Dilshod Nazarov	Tajikistan
silver medal	Kaveh Mousavi	Iran
bronze medal	Hiroaki Doi	Japan

The men's hammer throw event at the 2010 Asian Games was held at the Aoti Main Stadium, Guangzhou, China on 21 November.

== Schedule ==
All times are China Standard Time (UTC+08:00)

Date	Time	Event
Sunday, 21 November 2010	17:05	Final

== Records ==
Prior to this competition, the existing world, Asian and Games records were as follows.

World Record	Yuriy Sedykh (URS)	86.74	Stuttgart, West Germany	30 August 1986
Asian Record	Koji Murofushi (JPN)	84.86	Prague, Czech Republic	29 June 2003
Games Record	Koji Murofushi (JPN)	78.72	Busan, South Korea	8 October 2002

== Results ==
Legend

- NM — No mark

Rank	Athlete	Attempt						Result	Notes
Rank	Athlete	1	2	3	4	5	6	Result	Notes
1st place, gold medalist(s)	Dilshod Nazarov (TJK)	X	71.27	74.78	X	74.44	76.44	76.44	
2nd place, silver medalist(s)	Kaveh Mousavi (IRI)	58.76	X	59.07	68.90	X	X	68.90	
3rd place, bronze medalist(s)	Hiroaki Doi (JPN)	X	66.50	X	67.65	67.83	68.72	68.72	
4	Ali Al-Zenkawi (IOC)	60.00	62.29	X	68.65	X	64.02	68.65	
5	Amanmyrat Hommadow (TKM)	61.54	67.93	66.57	67.53	X	x	67.93	
6	Lee Yun-chul (KOR)	65.04	66.35	X	67.55	67.34	67.31	67.55	
7	Mohamed Faraj Al-Kaabi (QAT)	64.04	66.38	66.11	67.02	65.97	65.14	67.02	
8	Döwletgeldi Mamedow (TKM)	61.86	63.79	63.58	64.73	X	63.01	64.73	
9	Arniel Ferrera (PHI)	55.89	58.06	X				58.06	
10	Alisher Eshbekov (TJK)	57.57	57.10	X				57.57	
11	Hou Fei (MAC)	41.36	45.86	X				45.86	
—	Mohammad Al-Jawhar (IOC)	X	X	X				NM	
