= Athletics at the 2020 Summer Olympics – Men's hammer throw =

Men's hammer throw at the Games of the XXXII Olympiad
- Olympic Athletics
- Venue: Japan National Stadium
- Dates: 2 August 2021 (qualifying); 4 August 2021 (final)
- Competitors: 31 from 21 nations
- Winning distance: 82.52

Medalists
1st place, gold medalist(s)		Wojciech Nowicki	Poland
2nd place, silver medalist(s)		Eivind Henriksen	Norway
3rd place, bronze medalist(s)		Paweł Fajdek	Poland

The men's hammer throw event at the 2020 Summer Olympics took place between 2 and 4 August 2021 at the Japan National Stadium. Approximately 35 athletes were expected to compete; the exact number was dependent on how many nations used universality places to enter athletes in addition to the 32 qualifying through distance or ranking (no universality places were used in 2016). 31 athletes from 21 nations competed. Wojciech Nowicki of Poland won the gold medal, adding to his 2016 bronze to become the 15th man to earn multiple hammer throw medals. It was Poland's second gold medal in the event, after Szymon Ziółkowski's 2000 victory. Nowicki's countryman Paweł Fajdek took bronze. Between them was Norwegian thrower Eivind Henriksen, with his silver being Norway's first-ever Olympic medal in the men's hammer.

== Background ==
This was the 28th appearance of the event, which has been held at every Summer Olympics except the first in 1896.

Paweł Fajdek of Poland was the four-time reigning World Champion (2013, 2015, 2017, and 2019), qualified, and was a favorite in Tokyo.

No nations made their men's hammer throw debut, though Russian athletes competed as the "ROC" for the first time. The United States appeared for the 27th time, most of any nation, having missed only the boycotted 1980 Games.

== Qualification ==
A National Olympic Committee (NOC) could enter up to 3 qualified athletes in the men's hammer throw event if all athletes meet the entry standard or qualify by ranking during the qualifying period. (The limit of 3 has been in place since the 1930 Olympic Congress.) The qualifying standard is 77.50 metres. This standard was "set for the sole purpose of qualifying athletes with exceptional performances unable to qualify through the IAAF World Rankings pathway." The world rankings, based on the average of the best five results for the athlete over the qualifying period and weighted by the importance of the meet, will then be used to qualify athletes until the cap of 32 is reached.

The qualifying period was originally from 1 May 2019 to 29 June 2020. Due to the COVID-19 pandemic, the period was suspended from 6 April 2020 to 30 November 2020, with the end date extended to 29 June 2021. The world rankings period start date was also changed from 1 May 2019 to 30 June 2020; athletes who had met the qualifying standard during that time were still qualified, but those using world rankings would not be able to count performances during that time. The qualifying time standards could be obtained in various meets during the given period that have the approval of the IAAF. Both outdoor and indoor meets are eligible. The most recent Area Championships may be counted in the ranking, even if not during the qualifying period.

NOCs can also use their universality place—each NOC can enter one male athlete regardless of time if they had no male athletes meeting the entry standard for an athletics event—in the hammer throw.

== Competition format ==
The 2020 competition continued to use the two-round format with divided final introduced in 1936. The qualifying round gave each competitor three throws to achieve a qualifying distance (77.50 metres); if fewer than 12 men did so, the top 12 will advance. The final provided each thrower with three throws; the top eight throwers received an additional three throws for a total of six, with the best to count (qualifying round throws were not considered for the final).

== Records ==
Prior to this competition, the existing world, Olympic, and area records were as follows.

World record	Yuriy Sedykh (URS)	86.74	Stuttgart, Germany	30 August 1986
Olympic record	Sergey Litvinov (URS)	84.80	Seoul, South Korea	26 September 1988

Area	Distance (m)	Athlete	Nation
Africa (records)	81.27	Mostafa Al-Gamel	Egypt
Asia (records)	84.86	Koji Murofushi	Japan
Europe (records)	86.74 WR	Yuriy Sedykh	Soviet Union
North, Central America and Caribbean (records)	82.52	Lance Deal	United States
Oceania (records)	79.29	Stuart Rendell	Australia
South America (records)	78.63	Wagner Domingos	Brazil

== Schedule ==
All times are Japan Standard Time (UTC+9)

The men's hammer throw took place over two separate days.

Date	Time	Round
Monday, 2 August 2021	9:00	Qualifying
Wednesday, 4 August 2021	18:30	Final

== Results ==
=== Qualifying ===
Qualification rules: qualifying performance 77.50 (Q) or at least 12 best performers (q) advance to the final.

Rank	Group	Athlete	Nation	1	2	3	Distance	Notes
1	B	Wojciech Nowicki	Poland	79.78	—	—	79.78	Q
2	B	Rudy Winkler	United States	76.39	78.81	—	78.81	Q
3	B	Eivind Henriksen	Norway	78.79	—	—	78.79	Q, NR
4	A	Quentin Bigot	France	76.10	78.73	—	78.73	Q
5	A	Mykhaylo Kokhan	Ukraine	76.82	78.36	—	78.36	Q
6	A	Nick Miller	Great Britain	X	76.93	X	76.93	q
7	B	Javier Cienfuegos	Spain	72.76	75.56	76.91	76.91	q
8	A	Eşref Apak	Turkey	75.87	76.76	75.15	76.76	q
9	A	Paweł Fajdek	Poland	74.28	X	76.46	76.46	q
10	A	Serghei Marghiev	Moldova	74.31	72.25	75.94	75.94	q
11	A	Valeriy Pronkin	ROC	75.09	75.80	75.80	75.80	q
12	B	Daniel Haugh	United States	X	X	75.73	75.73	q
13	A	Gabriel Kehr	Chile	74.46	72.61	75.60	75.60	
14	A	Bence Halász	Hungary	75.39	X	75.03	75.39	
15	A	Diego del Real	Mexico	X	73.32	75.17	75.17	
16	A	Alex Young	United States	75.09	75.02	X	75.09	
17	B	Humberto Mansilla	Chile	73.17	74.76	72.77	74.76	
18	A	Ivan Tsikhan	Belarus	72.48	74.57	X	74.57	
19	B	Yury Vasilchanka	Belarus	X	73.27	74.00	74.00	
20	B	Hlib Piskunov	Ukraine	72.42	73.37	73.84	73.84	
21	B	Tristan Schwandke	Germany	72.92	72.74	73.77	73.77	
22	B	Mihail Anastasakis	Greece	73.52	73.22	X	73.52	
23	B	Mostafa El Gamel	Egypt	72.13	72.76	71.85	72.76	
24	B	Marcel Lomnický	Slovakia	71.17	X	72.52	72.52	
25	A	Christos Frantzeskakis	Greece	72.19	X	70.64	72.19	
26	B	Ashraf Amgad El-Seify	Qatar	71.84	X	X	71.84	
27	A	Hleb Dudarau	Belarus	X	71.04	71.60	71.60	
28	B	Taylor Campbell	Great Britain	X	71.34	X	71.34	
29	A	Suhrob Khodjaev	Uzbekistan	70.87	X	71.26	71.26	
30	B	Mergen Mämmedow	Turkmenistan	62.93	67.41	67.53	67.53	
31	B	Özkan Baltacı	Turkey	63.63	r	—	63.63	

=== Final ===
Rank	Athlete	Nation	1	2	3	4	5	6	Distance	Notes
1st place, gold medalist(s)	Wojciech Nowicki	Poland	81.18	81.72	82.52	81.39	82.06	X	82.52	PB
2nd place, silver medalist(s)	Eivind Henriksen	Norway	79.18	79.06	80.31	77.78	81.58	80.02	81.58	NR
3rd place, bronze medalist(s)	Paweł Fajdek	Poland	77.58	78.58	78.83	78.04	81.53	79.66	81.53	
4	Mykhaylo Kokhan	Ukraine	77.91	80.39	X	79.79	78.81	77.52	80.39	
5	Quentin Bigot	France	77.93	79.39	78.30	78.84	X	75.78	79.39	
6	Nick Miller	Great Britain	77.88	X	77.46	77.64	X	78.15	78.15	SB
7	Rudy Winkler	United States	77.08	X	75.95	X	75.34	X	77.08	
8	Valeriy Pronkin	ROC	76.72	X	X	X	75.97	74.73	76.72	
9	Eşref Apak	Turkey	76.22	76.71	74.28	Did not advance			76.71	
10	Javier Cienfuegos	Spain	74.62	X	76.30	Did not advance			76.30	
11	Daniel Haugh	United States	X	76.22	X	Did not advance			76.22	
12	Serghei Marghiev	Moldova	73.28	75.24	74.95	Did not advance			75.24	
