= Malyukov =

Malyukov (masculine, Russian: Малюков) or Malyukova (feminine, Russian: Малюкова), also transliterated as Maliukov, is a Russian surname. Notable people with the surname include:

- Aleksey Malyukov (born 1950), Russian hammer thrower and athletics coach
- Oleg Malyukov (born 1965), Russian footballer and manager
- Oleg Olegovich Malyukov (born 1985), Russian footballer and manager
