= Athletics at the 2006 Asian Games – Men's hammer throw =

Men's hammer throw at the 2006 Asian Games
- Venue: Khalifa International Stadium
- Date: 8 December 2006
- Competitors: 10 from 8 nations

Medalists
gold medal	Dilshod Nazarov	Tajikistan
silver medal	Ali Al-Zenkawi	Kuwait
bronze medal	Hiroaki Doi	Japan

The men's hammer throw competition at the 2006 Asian Games in Doha, Qatar was held on 8 December 2006 at the Khalifa International Stadium.

== Schedule ==
All times are Arabia Standard Time (UTC+03:00)

Date	Time	Event
Friday, 8 December 2006	17:20	Final

== Records ==
Prior to this competition, the existing world, Asian and Games records were as follows.

World Record	Yuriy Sedykh (URS)	86.74	Stuttgart, West Germany	30 August 1986
Asian Record	Koji Murofushi (JPN)	84.86	Prague, Czech Republic	29 June 2003
Games Record	Koji Murofushi (JPN)	78.72	Busan, South Korea	8 October 2002

== Results ==
Legend

- DNS — Did not start

Rank	Athlete	Attempt						Result	Notes
Rank	Athlete	1	2	3	4	5	6	Result	Notes
1st place, gold medalist(s)	Dilshod Nazarov (TJK)	X	69.13	X	68.28	74.43	X	74.43	
2nd place, silver medalist(s)	Ali Al-Zenkawi (KUW)	68.96	73.14	73.01	X	X	X	73.14	
3rd place, bronze medalist(s)	Hiroaki Doi (JPN)	67.52	X	X	68.11	69.45	67.77	69.45	
4	Lee Yun-chul (KOR)	68.56	67.11	X	66.01	68.32	69.07	69.07	
5	Mohamed Faraj Al-Kaabi (QAT)	63.26	64.26	67.56	65.21	65.50	X	67.56	
6	Mohammad Al-Jawhar (KUW)	X	60.62	64.64	X	X	63.35	64.64	
7	Arniel Ferrera (PHI)	54.78	57.29	57.50	55.87	X	57.36	57.50	
8	Hou Fei (MAC)	X	43.71	44.55	X	X	X	44.55	
—	Khaled Salah Gomaa (QAT)							DNS	
—	Döwletgeldi Mamedow (TKM)							DNS	
