= 2023 Asian Athletics Championships – Men's hammer throw =

Men's hammer throw at the 2023 Asian Athletics Championships
- Venue: National Stadium
- Location: Bangkok, Thailand
- Dates: 13 July
- Competitors: 15 from 10 nations
- Winning distance: 72.13 m

Medalists
gold medal	Wang Qi	China
silver medal	Sukhrob Khodyayev	Uzbekistan
bronze medal	Shota Fukuda	Japan

The men's hammer throw event at the 2023 Asian Athletics Championships was held on 13 July.

== Records ==
Records before the 2023 Asian Athletics Championships
Record	Athlete (nation)	Distance (m)	Location	Date
World record	Yuriy Sedykh (URS)	86.74	Stuttgart, West Germany	30 August 1986
Asian record	Koji Murofushi (JPN)	84.86	Prague, Czech Republic	29 June 2003
Championship record	Koji Murofushi (JPN)	80.45	Colombo, Sri Lanka	10 August 2002
World leading	Wojciech Nowicki (POL)	81.92	Oslo, Norway	15 June 2023
Asian leading	Wang Qi (CHN)	75.53	Kladno, Czech Republic	13 June 2023

== Results ==
Rank	Name	Nationality	#1	#2	#3	#4	#5	#6	Result	Notes
1st place, gold medalist(s)	Wang Qi	China	x	69.61	69.22	72.13	x	70.94	72.13	
2nd place, silver medalist(s)	Sukhrob Khodyayev	Uzbekistan	70.32	71.83	69.43	70.64	70.64	x	71.83	
3rd place, bronze medalist(s)	Shota Fukuda	Japan	69.27	71.80	69.10	70.74	x	x	71.80	PB
4	Ryota Kashimura	Japan	70.59	x	x	71.24	69.21	70.21	71.24	
5	Lee Yun-chul	South Korea	66.94	65.13	64.38	x	69.74	x	69.74	
6	Jackie Wong Siew Cheer	Malaysia	63.58	x	65.07	x	x	62.79	65.07	
7	Mohammed Al-Dubaisi	Saudi Arabia	63.08	64.42	x	63.86	63.48	x	64.42	
8	Kittipong Boonmawan	Thailand	x	62.04	62.14	x	62.02	x	62.14	
9	Mohamad Abdallah Al-Zayr	Saudi Arabia	61.48	59.41	61.25				61.48	
10	Mergen Mammedov	Turkmenistan	61.38	x	x				61.38	
11	Reza Moghaddam	Iran	x	x	61.31				61.31	
12	Ayubkhon Fayezov	Uzbekistan	x	x	59.80				59.80	
13	Sadat Marzuki Ajisan	Malaysia	58.04	58.94	59.40				59.40	
14	Amanmurad Hommadov	Turkmenistan	x	58.61	x				58.61	
	Mubeen Al-Kindi	Oman							DNS	
