= 2015 Asian Athletics Championships – Men's hammer throw =

2015 Asian Championships: Hammer Throw

The men's hammer throw event at the 2015 Asian Athletics Championships was held on June 4.

== Results ==
| Rank | Name | Nationality | #1 | #2 | #3 | #4 | #5 | #6 | Result | Notes |
|---|---|---|---|---|---|---|---|---|---|---|
| 1st place, gold medalist(s) | Dilshod Nazarov | Tajikistan | 75.32 | 77.46 | 73.69 | 77.12 | 77.68 | 77.05 | 77.68 | |
| 2nd place, silver medalist(s) | Ashraf Amgad Elseify | Qatar | 69.49 | 74.34 | 74.42 | 75.15 | 76.03 | x | 76.03 | |
| 3rd place, bronze medalist(s) | Wan Yong | China | x | 68.83 | 70.79 | 73.40 | 73.09 | 71.64 | 73.40 | |
| 4 | Suhrob Khodjaev | Uzbekistan | 69.81 | 70.48 | 71.78 | x | 72.63 | 71.85 | 72.63 | |
| 5 | Wang Shizhu | China | x | 71.71 | 71.38 | 71.14 | 70.65 | x | 71.71 | |
| 6 | Pezhman Ghalehnoei | Iran | 70.27 | x | x | x | x | 69.76 | 70.27 | |
| 7 | Mergen Mammedov | Turkmenistan | 65.42 | 65.89 | x | 63.55 | 63.97 | x | 65.89 | |
| 8 | Qi Dakai | China | 64.22 | 63.81 | 65.49 | x | x | 64.92 | 65.49 | |
| 9 | Toru Tanaka | Japan | 65.05 | 65.27 | 65.27 | | | | 65.27 | |
| 10 | Shakeel Ahmed | Pakistan | 61.84 | x | 60.24 | | | | 61.84 | |
| 11 | Jackie Wong Siew Cheer | Malaysia | 59.39 | x | 59.76 | | | | 59.76 | |
| 12 | Lam Wai | Hong Kong | x | x | 55.03 | | | | 55.03 | |
