= 2011 Asian Athletics Championships – Men's hammer throw =

The men's hammer throw event took place on July 9, 2011, at the Kobe Universiade Memorial Stadium.

== Results ==
Rank	Athlete	Nationality	#1	#2	#3	#4	#5	#6	Result	Notes
1st place, gold medalist(s)	Ali Zenkawi	Kuwait	72.58	73.45	72.97	70.19	73.73	x	73.73	
2nd place, silver medalist(s)	Hiroshi Noguchi	Japan	65.10	x	x	x	69.04	70.89	70.89	
3rd place, bronze medalist(s)	Hiroaki Doi	Japan	68.52	68.52	70.69	x	x	x	70.69	
4	Kaveh Mousavi	Iran	67.10	x	x	x	66.36	68.88	68.88	
5	Lee Yun-Chul	South Korea	64.39	64.83	65.02	66.38	66.61	67.97	67.97	
6	R. Moghadam Kord Maha	Iran	63.92	65.86	64.24	64.51	65.78	64.10	65.86	
7	Amanmurad Hommadov	Turkmenistan	62.70	64.15	65.09	x	x	65.38	65.38	
8	Alisher Eshbekov	Tajikistan	59.53	58.47	61.03	59.60	60.70	60.28	61.03	
9	Arniel Ferrera	Philippines	56.55	56.95	59.25				59.25	
10	Suhrob Khojaev	Uzbekistan	x	x	58.50				58.50	
11	J.S.C. Wong	Malaysia	52.97	50.63	x				52.97	
