= 2009 Asian Athletics Championships – Men's hammer throw =

The men's hammer throw event at the 2009 Asian Athletics Championships was held at the Guangdong Olympic Stadium on November 10.

== Results ==
Rank	Athlete	Nationality	#1	#2	#3	#4	#5	#6	Result	Notes
1st place, gold medalist(s)	Dilshod Nazarov	Tajikistan	69.45	75.52	71.80	74.43	x	76.92	76.92	
2nd place, silver medalist(s)	Ali Al-Zinkawi	Kuwait	70.55	x	x	x	68.88	73.45	73.45	
3rd place, bronze medalist(s)	Ma Liang	China	69.35	x	70.08	68.41	67.90	69.49	70.08	
4	Hiroaki Doi	Japan	x	x	69.75	x	x	x	69.75	
5	Kaveh Mousavi	Iran	62.73	68.15	66.13	66.60	x	x	68.15	
6	Mohamed Faraj Al-Kaabi	Qatar	63.48	65.72	67.09	65.91	66.28	x	67.09	PB
7	Lee Yun-chul	South Korea	x	66.24	65.83	65.82	64.06	x	66.24	
8	Qi Dakai	China	65.60	x	59.10	x	65.20	x	65.60	
9	Mohammad Aliawhar	Kuwait	x	65.39	x				65.39	
10	Alisher Eshbekov	Tajikistan	x	54.96	61.13				61.13	
11	Dovletgeldi Mamedov	Turkmenistan	59.70	x	x				59.70	
12	Tantipong Phetchaiya	Thailand	57.65	58.81	x				58.81	
13	Lam Wai	Hong Kong	52.08	x	x				52.08	
14	Hou Fei	Macau	47.27	47.45	46.40				47.45	
