= Track and field at the 2015 Military World Games – Men's hammer throw =

The men's hammer throw event at the 2015 Military World Games was held on 6 October at the KAFAC Sports Complex.

== Records ==
Prior to this competition, the existing world and CISM record were as follows:

World Record	Yuriy Sedykh (URS)	86.74	Stuttgart, Germany	30 August 1986
CISM World Record	Andriy Skvaruk (UKR)	79.76	Zagreb, Croatia	August 1999

== Schedule ==
Date	Time	Round
6 October 2015	14:35	Final

== Medalists ==
Gold	Silver	Bronze
Kirill Ikonnikov; Russia	Yevhen Vynohradov; Ukraine	Guo Kun; China

== Results ==
=== Final ===
Rank	Athlete	Nationality	#1	#2	#3	#4	#5	#6	Mark	Notes
1st place, gold medalist(s)	Kirill Ikonnikov	Russia	73.61	x	70.07	75.11	75.88	x	75.88	
2nd place, silver medalist(s)	Yevhen Vynohradov	Ukraine	72.11	x	74.77	x	73.30	72.86	74.77	
3rd place, bronze medalist(s)	Guo Kun	China	64.70	62.40	63.73	66.98	x	66.82	66.98	
4	Dong Won Jang	South Korea	60.64	63.12	63.66	64.84	63.76	65.55	65.55	
5	Markus Kokkonen	Finland	64.45	x	x	x	62.51	64.27	64.45	
6	Shakeel Ahmed	Pakistan	60.41	x	62.88	60.48	x	60.56	62.88	
	Emmanuel Chimdzeka	Malawi							DNS	
	Pethias Barclays Gondwe Mdoka	Malawi							DNS	
