= 2017 Asian Athletics Championships – Men's hammer throw =

The men's hammer throw at the 2017 Asian Athletics Championships was held on 8 July.

== Results ==
| Rank | Name | Nationality | #1 | #2 | #3 | #4 | #5 | #6 | Result | Notes |
|---|---|---|---|---|---|---|---|---|---|---|
| 1st place, gold medalist(s) | Dilshod Nazarov | Tajikistan | 71.12 | 72.65 | 75.09 | x | 75.06 | 76.69 | 76.69 | |
| 2nd place, silver medalist(s) | Wang Shizhu | China | 67.21 | 73.81 | x | 71.98 | x | x | 73.81 | |
| 3rd place, bronze medalist(s) | Lee Yun-chul | South Korea | 71.54 | 72.23 | x | 70.32 | 73.70 | 73.77 | 73.77 | NR |
| 4 | Yudai Kimura | Japan | 65.37 | 64.60 | 66.36 | 67.23 | 69.85 | 61.76 | 69.85 | |
| 5 | Reza Moghadam | Iran | x | 64.92 | 68.86 | 66.59 | 67.44 | 67.72 | 68.86 | |
| 6 | Ryota Kashimura | Japan | 67.84 | 68.02 | 67.73 | x | 67.94 | x | 68.02 | |
| 7 | Ahmed Amgad Elseify | Qatar | x | 66.27 | 66.71 | 67.19 | 67.81 | 67.54 | 67.81 | |
| 8 | Jackie Wong | Malaysia | 61.05 | 64.17 | x | x | x | 64.84 | 64.84 | |
| 9 | Niraj Kumar | India | x | 63.07 | 63.26 | | | | 63.26 | |
| 10 | Ardiansyah Apandy | Indonesia | 45.23 | 47.15 | x | | | | 47.15 | |
| 11 | Hedayet Md Hossain | Bangladesh | x | 33.76 | 41.21 | | | | 41.21 | |
