= 2012 World Junior Championships in Athletics – Men's hammer throw =

Estadi Olímpic Lluís Companys

The men's hammer throw at the 2012 World Junior Championships in Athletics was held at the Estadi Olímpic Lluís Companys on 13 and 14 July.

== Medalists ==
Gold	Silver	Bronze
Ashraf Amgad Elseify; Qatar	Bence Pásztor; Hungary	Suhrob Khodjaev; Uzbekistan

== Records ==
Prior to the competition, the existing world junior and championship records were as follows.

World Junior Record	Javier Cienfuegos (ESP)	82.97	Madrid, Spain	17 June 2009
Championship Record	Conor McCullough (USA)	80.79	Moncton, Canada	21 July 2010
World Junior Leading	Ashraf Amgad Elseify (QAT)	80.85	Colombo, Sri Lanka	11 June 2012
Broken records during the 2012 World Junior Championships in Athletics
World Junior Record	Ashraf Amgad Elseify (QAT)	85.57	Barcelona, Spain	14 July 2012

=== Qualification ===
Qual. rule: qualification standard 72.50 m (Q) or at least best 12 qualified (q)

Rank	Group	Name	Nationality	#1	#2	#3	Result	Note
1	A	Ashraf Amgad Elseify	Qatar	79.98			79.98	Q
2	B	Alexandros Poursanidis	Cyprus	75.16			75.16	Q
3	B	Serhii Reheda	Ukraine	69.75	74.40		74.40	Q
4	B	Juho Saarikoski	Finland	66.75	72.20	73.85	73.85	Q
5	B	Suhrob Khodjaev	Uzbekistan	73.56			73.56	Q, PB
6	A	Igor Buryi	Russia	70.21	73.45		73.45	Q
7	A	Bence Pásztor	Hungary	73.33			73.33	Q
8	A	Ilmari Lahtinen	Finland	71.62	68.52	73.30	73.30	Q, SB
9	A	Rudy Winkler	United States	73.18			73.18	Q, PB
10	A	Özkan Baltaci	Turkey	70.58	71.38	72.84	72.84	Q
11	B	Valeriy Pronkin	Russia	70.94	72.77		72.77	Q
12	B	Jørgen Olsen Austnes	Norway	67.28	X	71.88	71.88	q, PB
13	A	Anders Eriksson	Sweden	X	64.98	70.70	70.70	PB
14	B	Marco Bortolato	Italy	65.34	65.49	70.32	70.32	
15	B	Oscar Vestlund	Sweden	X	69.81	X	69.81	
16	B	Balázs Töreky	Hungary	67.95	69.75	68.80	69.75	
17	A	Diego del Real	Mexico	69.56	65.26	X	69.56	
18	B	James McCabe	Ireland	69.49	X	65.14	69.49	PB
19	A	Antoine Nabialek	France	66.70	68.32	69.43	69.43	PB
20	A	Dempsey McGuigan	Ireland	68.33	67.08	69.27	69.27	
21	A	Eslam Ahmed Ibrahim	Egypt	65.87	68.80	X	68.80	
22	B	Matthias Tayala	United States	68.70	X	X	68.70	
23	B	Bastian Abend	Germany	67.24	67.83	X	67.83	
24	A	Siarhei Salianik	Belarus	67.51	67.64	X	67.64	
25	B	Nick Miller	Great Britain	X	X	67.46	67.46	
26	B	Ayhan Apti	Bulgaria	67.16	X	X	67.16	
27	A	Michael Painter	Great Britain	67.00	X	X	67.00	
28	B	Adam Keenan	Canada	66.56	64.50	X	66.56	
29	A	Kjetil Røste Ringen	Norway	64.18	66.23	66.39	66.39	
30	B	Robert Johnston	Australia	62.21	66.15	66.33	66.33	
31	A	Sergio Guijo	Spain	62.57	X	65.95	65.95	
32	A	Patrizio Di Blasio	Italy	64.43	65.29	X	65.29	
33	B	Sukhdev Singh	India	64.90	X	65.21	65.21	
34	B	Abraham Parra	Mexico	63.55	64.79	65.16	65.16	
35	A	Simon Lang	Germany	63.82	64.98	64.56	64.98	
36	A	Hevertt Álvarez	Chile	63.87	64.67	X	64.67	
37	A	Sebastian Nowicki	Poland	X	63.16	X	63.16	
38	A	Mobarak Al-Hendal	Kuwait	X	61.88	X	61.88	
39	B	Yury Vasilchanka	Belarus	59.86	X	61.82	61.82	
40	B	Jonathan Gras	Argentina	61.57	59.19	59.92	61.57	
41	B	Pablo González	Spain	59.37	59.09	61.26	61.26	
42	B	Fabián Serna	Colombia	X	X	60.63	60.63	
43	A	Artem Poleshko	Ukraine	X	X	60.16	60.16	
44	B	Martynas Šedys	Lithuania	X	59.30	X	59.30	
45	A	Enrique Gaitán	Guatemala	X	58.57	55.89	58.57	
–	A	Jordan Young	Canada	X	X	X	NM	
–	B	Tolgahan Yavuz	Turkey	X	X	X	NM	

=== Final ===
Rank	Name	Nationality	#1	#2	#3	#4	#5	#6	Result	Note
1st place, gold medalist(s)	Ashraf Amgad Elseify	Qatar	77.23	78.61	81.84	81.60	85.57	X	85.57	WJ
2nd place, silver medalist(s)	Bence Pásztor	Hungary	X	76.74	75.57	72.94	72.58	74.85	76.74	
3rd place, bronze medalist(s)	Suhrob Khodjaev	Uzbekistan	X	73.25	75.11	76.16	70.28	X	76.16	PB
4	Alexandros Poursanidis	Cyprus	X	X	76.05	74.20	X	75.74	76.05	
5	Igor Buryi	Russia	73.88	75.45	73.87	74.13	74.28	75.83	75.83	PB
6	Ilmari Lahtinen	Finland	72.57	73.82	75.26	X	X	70.56	75.26	NJ
7	Juho Saarikoski	Finland	69.81	74.47	74.89	X	73.87	X	74.89	PB
8	Valeriy Pronkin	Russia	69.64	73.01	X	69.41	74.51	X	74.51	
9	Serhii Reheda	Ukraine	69.84	X	72.37				72.37	
10	Özkan Baltaci	Turkey	X	67.91	70.98				70.98	
11	Rudy Winkler	United States	63.88	X	69.35				69.35	
12	Jørgen Olsen Austnes	Norway	64.05	69.01	X				69.01	

== Participation ==
According to an unofficial count, 47 athletes from 31 countries participated in the event.

- Argentina (1)
- Australia (1)
- Belarus (2)
- Bulgaria (1)
- Canada (2)
- Chile (1)
- Colombia (1)
- Cyprus (1)
- Egypt (1)
- Finland (2)
- France (1)
- Germany (2)
- Guatemala (1)
- Hungary (2)
- India (1)
- Ireland (2)
- Italy (2)
- Kuwait (1)
- Lithuania (1)
- Mexico (2)
- Norway (2)
- Poland (1)
- Qatar (1)
- Russia (2)
- Spain (2)
- Sweden (2)
- Turkey (2)
- Ukraine (2)
- United Kingdom (2)
- United States (2)
- Uzbekistan (1)
