= Bence Pásztor =

Hungarian hammer thrower

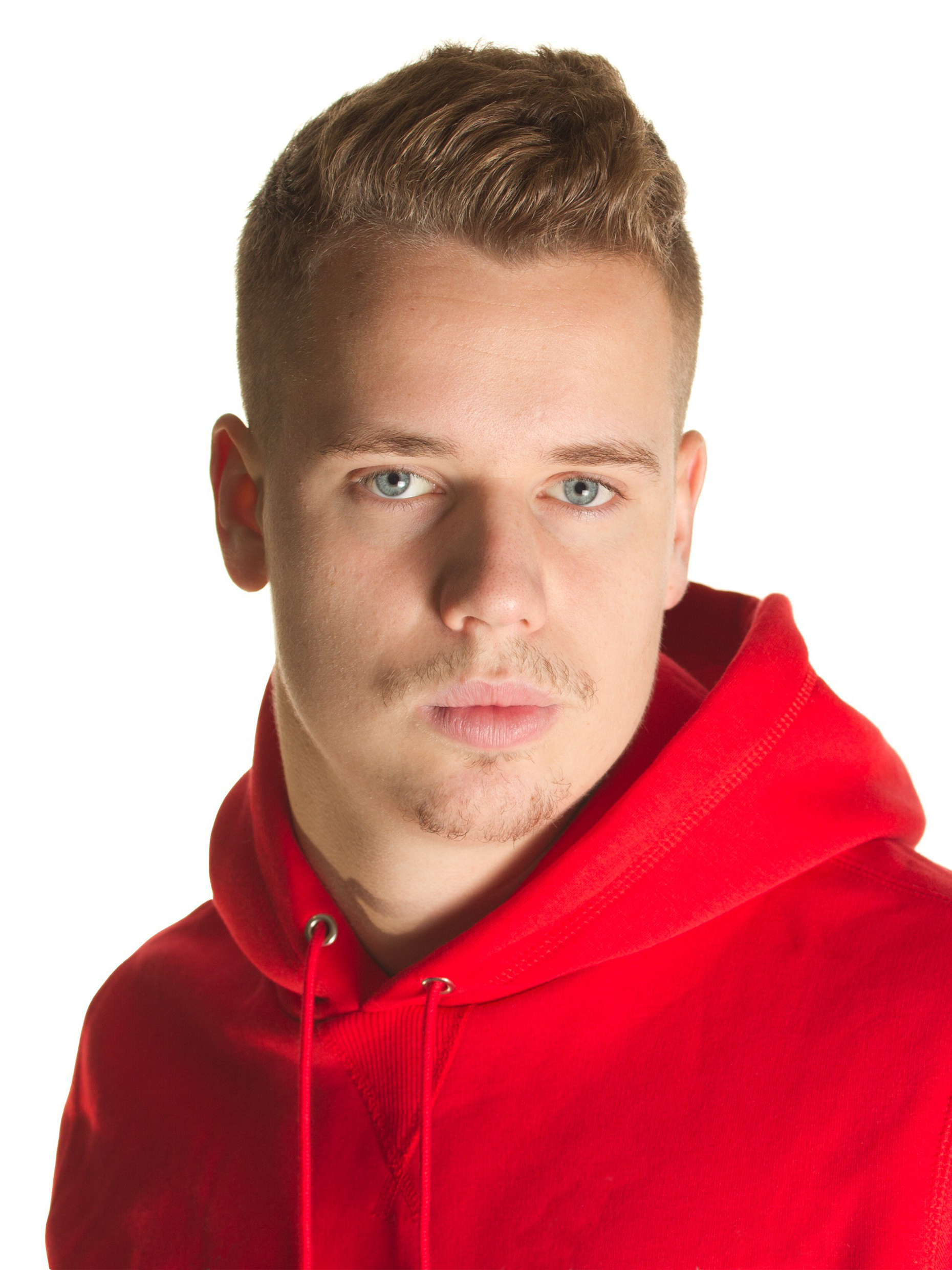

Personal information
- Nationality: Hungary
- Born: 5 February 1995 (age 31)

Sport
- Sport: Track and field
- Event: Hammer throw

Achievements and titles
- Personal bests: HT (7.3 kg): 75.74 m (Veszprém 2015) HT (6 kg): 77.02 m (Veszprém 2012) HT (5 kg): 84.41 m (Trabzon 2011) WYB
Medal record
Men's Athletics
Representing Hungary
World Junior Championships
Silver medal – second place	2012 Barcelona	Hammer throw
Silver medal – second place	2014 Oregon	Hammer throw
World Youth Championships
Gold medal – first place	2011 Lille	Hammer throw

Bence Pásztor (born 5 February 1995) is a Hungarian hammer thrower.

He won a gold medal at the 2011 World Youth Championships in Athletics, establishing a new championship record. Only days later, at the 2011 European Youth Summer Olympic Festival, he set a new World Youth Best with a throw of 84.41 m (276 ft 11 in).

== Competition record ==
Year	Competition	Venue	Position	Event	Notes
Representing Hungary
2011	World Youth Championships	Lille, France	1st	Hammer throw (5 kg)	82.60 m
2011	European Youth Olympic Festival	Trabzon, Turkey	1st	Hammer throw (5 kg)	84.41 m
2012	World Junior Championships	Barcelona, Spain	2nd	Hammer throw (6 kg)	76.74 m
2013	European Junior Championships	Rieti, Italy	2nd	Hammer throw (6 kg)	77.35 m
2014	World Junior Championships	Eugene, United States	2nd	Hammer throw (6 kg)	79.99 m
2015	European U23 Championships	Tallinn, Estonia	3rd	Hammer throw	74.06 m
2015	World Championships	Beijing, China	28th (q)	Hammer throw	71.14 m
2016	European Championships	Amsterdam, Netherlands	17th (q)	Hammer throw	71.20 m
2017	European U23 Championships	Bydgoszcz, Poland	2nd	Hammer throw	71.51 m
2018	European Championships	Berlin, Germany	26th (q)	Hammer throw	69.66 m
