= Kaveh Mousavi =

Iranian hammer thrower

Personal information
- Born: May 27, 1985 (age 41)
- Height: 2.03 m (6 ft 8 in)
- Weight: 120 kg (260 lb)

Sport
- Country: Iran
- Sport: Athletics
- Event: Hammer throw
Medal record
Asian Games
Silver medal – second place	2010 Guangzhou	Hammer
- Updated on 10 July 2016

Kaveh Mousavi (Persian: کاوه موسوی, born 27 May 1985 in Urmia) is an Iranian athlete. He competed for Iran in hammer throw at the 2012 Summer Olympics.

His has a personal best of 77.40 meters achieved in Belarus on 8 July 2016 which is the current Iranian record. The record was thrown three before the end of the Rio Olympics qualification period. The date and the unclear circumstances of the throw have led to questions of the validity of the result and IAAF board member Antti Pihlakoski has stated he will investigate the issue.

== Competition record ==
Year	Competition	Venue	Position	Event	Notes
Representing Iran
2004	Asian Junior Championships	Ipoh, Malaysia	5th	Hammer throw (6 kg)	60.76 m
2004	World Junior Championships	Grosseto, Italy	19th (q)	Hammer throw (6 kg)	65.23 m
2009	Universiade	Belgrade, Serbia	15th (q)	Hammer throw	63.96 m
2009	Asian Championships	Guangzhou, China	5th	Hammer throw	68.15 m
2010	West Asian Championships	Aleppo, Syria	2nd	Hammer throw	69.91 m
2010	Asian Games	Guangzhou, China	2nd	Hammer throw	68.90 m
2011	Asian Championships	Kobe, Japan	4th	Hammer throw	68.88 m
2011	Universiade	Shenzhen, China	8th	Hammer throw	68.80 m
2011	World Championships	Daegu, South Korea	31st (q)	Hammer throw	68.01 m
2012	Olympic Games	London, United Kingdom	22nd (q)	Hammer throw	72.70 m
2012	West Asian Championships	Dubai, United Arab Emirates	2nd	Hammer throw	70.43 m
2013	Asian Championships	Pune, India	5th	Hammer throw	71.43 m
2013	Islamic Solidarity Games	Palembang, Indonesia	5th	Hammer throw	68.01 m
2014	Asian Games	Incheon, South Korea	–	Hammer throw	NM
2016	Olympic Games	Rio de Janeiro, Brazil	29th (q)	Hammer throw	65.03 m
