= Athletics at the 2002 Asian Games – Men's hammer throw =

Men's hammer throw at the 2002 Asian Games
- Venue: Busan Asiad Main Stadium
- Date: 8 October 2002
- Competitors: 9 from 8 nations

Medalists
gold medal	Koji Murofushi	Japan
silver medal	Hiroaki Doi	Japan
bronze medal	Ye Kuigang	China

The men's hammer throw competition at the 2002 Asian Games in Busan, South Korea was held on 8 October at the Busan Asiad Main Stadium.

== Schedule ==
All times are Korea Standard Time (UTC+09:00)

Date	Time	Event
Tuesday, 8 October 2002	09:30	Final

== Records ==
Prior to this competition, the existing world, Asian and Games records were as follows.

World Record	Yuriy Sedykh (URS)	86.74	Stuttgart, West Germany	30 August 1986
Asian Record	Koji Murofushi (JPN)	83.47	Toyota, Japan	14 July 2001
Games Record	Koji Murofushi (JPN)	78.57	Bangkok, Thailand	13 December 1998

== Results ==
Rank	Athlete	Attempt						Result	Notes
Rank	Athlete	1	2	3	4	5	6	Result	Notes
1st place, gold medalist(s)	Koji Murofushi (JPN)	76.00	78.72	76.89	78.48	X	78.58	78.72	GR
2nd place, silver medalist(s)	Hiroaki Doi (JPN)	X	63.59	66.76	69.01	69.57	68.02	69.57	
3rd place, bronze medalist(s)	Ye Kuigang (CHN)	63.01	66.91	68.18	65.68	66.78	66.55	68.18	
4	Viktor Ustinov (UZB)	X	65.73	63.58	65.08	X	X	65.73	
5	Hou Chin-hsien (TPE)	63.46	63.85	64.08	64.95	64.14	61.51	64.95	
6	Pramod Tiwari (IND)	62.14	61.77	X	X	64.54	X	64.54	
7	Naser Al-Jarallah (KUW)	62.73	62.47	60.49	64.17	63.07	64.29	64.29	
8	Lee Yun-chul (KOR)	62.57	61.77	61.87	X	X	X	62.57	
9	Dilshod Nazarov (TJK)	X	X	58.39				58.39	
