= Aliaksandr Kazulka =

Belarusian hammer thrower

Aliaksandr Kazulka (Belarusian: Аляксандр Казулька; born December 8, 1983) is a male hammer thrower from Belarus. He set his personal best (78.54 metres) in the men's hammer throw event on July 6, 2006, in Brest, Belarus.

== Achievements ==
| Year | Competition | Venue | Position | Notes |
Representing Belarus
| 2002 | World Junior Championships | Kingston, Jamaica | 3rd | 72.72 m (6 kg) |
| 2005 | European U23 Championships | Erfurt, Germany | 2nd | 73.60 m |
| 2007 | Universiade | Bangkok, Thailand | 2nd | 74.52 m |
