= Lee Yun-chul =

South Korean hammer thrower

Personal information
- Nationality: South Korea
- Born: 10 March 1982 (age 44)

Sport
- Sport: Athletics
- Event: Hammer throw
Medal record
Men's athletics
Representing South Korea
Asian Championships
Bronze medal – third place	2017 Bhubaneswar	Hammer throw

Lee Yun-chul (born 28 March 1982 in Gunsan) is a South Korean athlete who specialises in the hammer throw. He represented his country at the 2011 World Championships without qualifying for the final.

His personal best of 73.77 metres is the current national record.

== Competition record ==
Year	Competition	Venue	Position	Event	Notes
Representing South Korea
2002	Asian Championships	Colombo, Sri Lanka	5th	Hammer throw	63.53 m
2002	Asian Games	Busan, South Korea	8th	Hammer throw	62.57 m
2003	Asian Championships	Manila, Philippines	6th	Hammer throw	64.56 m
2005	Asian Championships	Incheon, South Korea	5th	Hammer throw	64.56 m
2005	East Asian Games	Macau, China	2nd	Hammer throw	66.40 m
2006	Asian Games	Doha, Qatar	4th	Hammer throw	69.07 m
2007	Asian Championships	Amman, Jordan	4th	Hammer throw	64.51 m
2007	Universiade	Bangkok, Thailand	11th	Hammer throw	66.86 m
2009	Asian Championships	Guangzhou, China	7th	Hammer throw	66.24 m
2010	Asian Games	Guangzhou, China	6th	Hammer throw	67.55 m
2011	Asian Championships	Kobe, Japan	5th	Hammer throw	67.97 m
2011	World Championships	Daegu, South Korea	29th (q)	Hammer throw	68.98 m
2013	Asian Championships	Pune, India	4th	Hammer throw	72.98 m
2013	East Asian Games	Tianjin, China	2nd	Hammer throw	67.65 m
2014	Asian Games	Incheon, South Korea	6th	Hammer throw	70.36 m
2017	Asian Championships	Bhubaneswar, India	3rd	Hammer throw	73.77 m
2018	Asian Games	Jakarta, Indonesia	5th	Hammer throw	71.10 m
2019	Asian Championships	Doha, Qatar	5th	Hammer throw	69.81 m
2023	Asian Championships	Bangkok, Thailand	5th	Hammer throw	69.74 m
2023	Asian Games	Hangzhou, China	5th	Hammer throw	69.12 m
2025	Asian Championships	Gumi, South Korea	7th	Hammer throw	66.70 m
