= 2005 European Athletics U23 Championships – Men's hammer throw =

The men's hammer throw event at the 2005 European Athletics U23 Championships was held in Erfurt, Germany, at Steigerwaldstadion on 16 July.

== Medalists ==
Gold	Pavel Kryvitski; Belarus
Silver	Aliaksandr Kazulka; Belarus
Bronze	Andrey Azarenkov; Russia

== Results ==
=== Final ===
16 July

Rank	Name	Nationality	Attempts						Result	Notes
Rank	Name	Nationality	1	2	3	4	5	6	Result	Notes
1st place, gold medalist(s)	Pavel Kryvitski	Belarus	69.65	72.15	73.72	x	x	x	73.72	
2nd place, silver medalist(s)	Aliaksandr Kazulka	Belarus	67.89	71.92	70.57	72.46	73.60	73.07	73.60	
3rd place, bronze medalist(s)	Andrey Azarenkov	Russia	71.18	x	x	x	68.24	x	71.18	
4	Lorenzo Povegliano	Italy	x	67.81	67.97	x	65.74	69.98	69.98	
5	Frédéric Pouzy	France	67.76	67.77	67.38	68.63	x	68.90	68.90	
6	Yevhen Vynohradov	Ukraine	68.65	x	66.04	x	x	68.53	68.65	
7	Lasse Luotonen	Finland	x	63.77	66.72	x	67.04	67.40	67.40	
8	Massimo Marussi	Italy	x	x	65.73	x	65.09	63.46	65.73	
9	Matko Tešija	Croatia	63.80	65.64	64.48				65.64	
10	Michal Fiala	Czech Republic	64.75	65.44	65.16				65.44	
11	Dušan Král	Czech Republic	x	55.91	61.48				61.48	
	Dmitriy Velikopolskiy	Russia	x	x	x				NM	

== Participation ==
According to an unofficial count, 12 athletes from 8 countries participated in the event.

- Belarus (2)
- Croatia (1)
- Czech Republic (2)
- Finland (1)
- France (1)
- Italy (2)
- Russia (2)
- Ukraine (1)
