= Athletics at the 2007 Summer Universiade – Men's hammer throw =

The men's hammer throw event at the 2007 Summer Universiade was held on 14 August.

== Results ==
Rank	Athlete	Nationality	#1	#2	#3	#4	#5	$6	Result	Notes
1st place, gold medalist(s)	Aliaksandr Vashchyla	Belarus	x	71.77	x	x	76.94	x	76.94	
2nd place, silver medalist(s)	Aliaksandr Kazulka	Belarus	67.69	72.19	x	72.60	73.89	74.52	74.52	
3rd place, bronze medalist(s)	Igor Vinichenko	Russia	70.09	65.60	67.77	69.95	72.35	73.94	73.94	
4	Mohsen El Anany	Egypt	70.98	70.88	72.66	x	68.76	x	72.66	PB
5	Dmitry Velikopolsky	Russia	71.23	69.85	67.78	68.94	72.05	64.92	72.05	
6	Lorenzo Povegliano	Italy	70.15	x	x	70.95	71.41	68.12	71.41	
7	Frédérick Pouzy	France	68.43	69.40	68.36	x	68.44	x	69.40	
8	Benjamin Boruschewski	Germany	68.42	66.72	x	x	x	65.83	68.42	
9	Fatih Eryildirim	Turkey	68.36	65.73	65.07				68.36	
10	Benjamin Siart	Austria	67.47	63.02	66.15				67.47	
11	Lee Yun-chul	South Korea	66.25	66.86	x				66.86	
12	Ainars Valculens	Latvia	65.66	x	64.42				65.66	
13	Yongjaros Kanju	Thailand	49.18	x	48.65				49.18	
14	Tantipong Phetchaiya	Thailand	x	48.96	x				48.96	
15	Israr Ahmed	Pakistan	x	44.27	46.98				46.98	
	Yevhen Vynohradov	Ukraine	x	x	x				NM	
