= Hiroaki Doi =

Japanese hammer thrower (born 1978)

Medal record

Men's athletics

Representing Japan

Asian Championships
Silver medal – second place	2002 Colombo	Hammer throw
Silver medal – second place	2003 Manila	Hammer throw
Bronze medal – third place	2005 Incheon	Hammer throw
Bronze medal – third place	2007 Amman	Hammer throw

Hiroaki Doi (土井宏昭, Doi Hiroaki; born December 2, 1978) is a Japanese hammer thrower. His personal best throw is 74.08 metres, achieved in June 2007 in Inba.

== Achievements ==
Year	Competition	Venue	Position	Notes
Representing Japan
2002	Asian Championships	Colombo, Sri Lanka	2nd	70.27 m
2002	Asian Games	Busan, South Korea	2nd	69.57 m
2003	Asian Championships	Manila, Philippines	2nd	70.11 m
2005	Asian Championships	Incheon, South Korea	3rd	68.50 m
2005	East Asian Games	Macau	1st	70.35 m
2006	Asian Games	Doha, Qatar	3rd	69.45 m
2007	World Championships	Osaka, Japan	26th (q)	69.89 m
2007	Asian Championships	Amman, Jordan	3rd	70.74 m
2009	Asian Championships	Guangzhou, China	4th	69.75 m
2009	East Asian Games	Hong Kong	1st	71.25 m
2010	Asian Games	Guangzhou, China	3rd	68.72 m
2011	Asian Championships	Kobe, Japan	3rd	70.69 m
