= Valeriy Pronkin =

Russian hammer thrower

Personal information
- Native name: Валерий Александрович Пронкин
- Full name: Valeriy Alexandrovich Pronkin
- National team: Russia
- Born: 15 June 1994 (age 32) Nizhny Novgorod, Russia
- Height: 1.95 m (6 ft 5 in)
- Weight: 115 kg (254 lb)

Sport
- Country: Russia; ANA (2017); ROC (2021)
- Sport: Men's athletics
- Event: Hammer throw

Achievements and titles
- Personal best: 79.32 m (2017)
Medal record
World Championships
Silver medal – second place	2017 London	Hammer

Valeriy Alexandrovich Pronkin (Russian: Валерий Александрович Пронкин; born 15 June 1994) is a Russian hammer thrower. His personal best is 79.32 metres, achieved in July 2017 in Zhukovskiy. He won the silver medal at the 2017 World Championships competing as a neutral athlete.

== International competitions ==
Year	Competition	Venue	Position	Event	Notes
Representing Russia
2011	World Youth Championships	Lille, France	10th	Discus throw (1.5 kg)	56.39 m
2011	World Youth Championships	Lille, France	9th (q)	Hammer throw (5 kg)	66.06 m
2012	World Junior Championships	Barcelona, Spain	8th	Hammer throw (6 kg)	74.51 m
2013	European Junior Championships	Rieti, Italy	1st	Hammer throw (6 kg)	78.34 m
2015	European U23 Championships	Tallinn, Estonia	2nd	Hammer throw	74.29 m
Competed as an Authorised Neutral Athlete
2017	World Championships	London, United Kingdom	2nd	Hammer throw	78.16 m
2021	Olympic Games	Tokyo, Japan	8th	Hammer throw	76.72 m
