= Igor Vinichenko =

Russian hammer thrower

Igor Alekseyevich Vinichenko (Russian: Игорь Алексеевич Виниченко; born 21 April 1984) is a male hammer thrower from Russia. His personal best throw is 80.00 metres, achieved in February 2007 in Adler. He competed at the 2008 Olympic Games without reaching the final.

== Doping ==
Vinichenko tested positive for Dehydrochloromethyltestosterone (Oral Turinabol) on 27 February 2013 and was subsequently banned for two years, ending 12 March 2015.

== International competitions ==
Representing Russia
Year	Competition	Venue	Position	Notes
2007	Universiade	Bangkok, Thailand	3rd	73.94 m
2008	Olympic Games	Beijing, China	22nd (q)	72.05 m
2009	World Championships	Berlin, Germany	12th	NM
2010	European Championships	Barcelona, Spain	8th	74.32 m
2011	Universiade	Shenzhen, China	13th	65.78 m

== See also ==
- List of doping cases in athletics
