= Lorenzo Povegliano =

Italian hammer thrower (born 1984)

Personal information
- Nationality: Italian
- Born: 11 November 1984 (age 41) Palmanova, Italy
- Height: 1.87 m (6 ft 2 in)
- Weight: 102 kg (225 lb)

Sport
- Country: Italy
- Sport: Athletics
- Event: Hammer throw
- Club: C.S. Carabinieri

Achievements and titles
- Personal bests: Hammer throw: 79.08 m (2012)
Medal record
European Junior Championships
Gold medal – first place	Tampere 2003	Hammer throw
Universiade
Bronze medal – third place	Shenzhen 2011	Hammer throw

Lorenzo Povegliano (born 11 November 1984, in Palmanova) is an Italian hammer thrower.

== Biography ==
On 12 May 2012, in Codroipo, Povegliano threw the hammer 79.08 meters, which, in addition to being his personal best, was also the 4th best performance in the world this year, 5th best Italian performance of all time, and the standard A for the 2012 European Athletics Championships and 2012 Summer Olympics.

== Personal best ==
- Hammer throw: 79.08 m (Codroipo, 12 May 2012)

== Achievements ==
Year	Competition	Venue	Position	Event	Notes
Representing Italy
2003	European Junior Championships	(Finland) Tampere	1st	Hammer throw (6 kg)	72.72 m
2005	European U23 Championships	(Germany) Erfurt	4th	Hammer throw	69.98 m
2007	Universiade	(Thailand) Bangkok	6th	Hammer throw	71.41 m
2011	Universiade	(China) Shenzhen	3rd	Hammer throw	73.39 m
2012	Olympic Games	(United Kingdom) London	27th (q)	Hammer throw	71.55 m

== National titles ==
- 1 win in the hammer throw at the Italian Athletics Championships (2012)
- 1 win in the hammer throw at the Italian Winter Throwing Championships (2012)

== See also ==
- Italian all-time top lists - Hammer throw
