= 2000 Asian Athletics Championships – Men's hammer throw =

The men's hammer throw event at the 2000 Asian Athletics Championships was held in Jakarta, Indonesia on 29 August.

== Results ==
Rank	Name	Nationality	#1	#2	#3	#4	#5	#6	Result	Notes
1st place, gold medalist(s)	Watara Ebihara	Japan	65.01	67.93	66.51	66.68	69.50	x	69.50	
2nd place, silver medalist(s)	Ye Kuigang	China	65.84	62.99	69.48	x	x	67.10	69.48	
3rd place, bronze medalist(s)	Nasser Al-Jarallah	Kuwait	66.98	66.28	65.82	66.86	x	x	66.98	
4	Nikolay Davidov	Kyrgyzstan							66.31	
5	Pramod Kumar Tiwari	India							65.98	
6	Hou Chin-Hsien	Chinese Taipei							65.56	
7	Dilshod Nazarov	Tajikistan							61.62	
8	Dovletgeldy Mamedov	Turkmenistan							59.21	
9	Ong Kok Hin	Indonesia							48.39	
10	Cakra Hadi Mulya	Indonesia							43.89	
