= Kirill Ikonnikov =

Russian hammer thrower

Personal information
- Born: March 5, 1984 (age 41) Leningrad, Soviet Union (today Russia)
- Height: 1.87 m (6 ft 1 1/2 in)
- Weight: 115 kg (254 lb)

Sport
- Country: Russia
- Sport: Athletics
- Event: Hammer throw
- Updated on 14 August 2012

Kirill Gennadiyevich Ikonnikov (Russian: Кирилл Геннадиевич Иконников; born 5 March 1984, in Leningrad) is a male hammer thrower from Russia. His personal best throw is 79.20 metres, achieved in June 2008 in Zhukovsky.

== Doping ==
He was serving a 2-year competition ban for the use of a prohibited substance, Dehydrochloromethyltestosterone, lasting from 8 October 2012 to 1 November 2014.

Samples taken during the 2012 Olympics were retested in 2016. On October 27, 2016 it was announced that Ikonnikov tested positive for dehydrochlormethyltestosterone (turinabol) and his results from the 2012 Olympics, 2 months before the previous ban, were also disqualified.

== International competitions ==
Representing Russia
Year	Competition	Venue	Position	Notes
2001	World Youth Championships	Debrecen, Hungary	3rd	77.75 m (5 kg)
2002	World Junior Championships	Kingston, Jamaica	5th	71.26 m (6 kg)
2003	European Junior Championships	Tampere, Finland	4th	71.60 m (6 kg)
2008	Olympic Games	Beijing, China	21st	72.33 m
2011	World Championships	Daegu, South Korea	6th	78.37 m
2012	Olympic Games	London, United Kingdom	DSQ ~~5th~~	~~77.86 m~~
2015	Military World Games	Mungyeong, South Korea	1st	75.88 m

== See also ==
- List of doping cases in athletics
