= 2013 Asian Athletics Championships – Men's hammer throw =

The men's hammer throw at the 2013 Asian Athletics Championships was held at the Shree Shiv Chhatrapati Sports Complex on 6 July.

== Results ==
Rank	Name	Nationality	#1	#2	#3	#4	#5	#6	Result	Notes
1st place, gold medalist(s)	Dilshod Nazarov	Tajikistan	77.19	78.08	75.53	77.86	x	78.32	78.32	
2nd place, silver medalist(s)	Ali Al-Zinkawi	Kuwait	73.09	x	69.40	74.52	70.81	74.70	74.70	
3rd place, bronze medalist(s)	Qi Dakai	China	69.99	71.77	72.45	74.19	72.93	69.81	74.19	
4	Lee Yun-Chul	South Korea	x	70.34	70.40	70.49	70.16	72.98	72.98	NR
5	Kaveh Mousavi	Iran	69.09	x	71.43	69.41	x	x	71.43	
6	Hiroshi Noguchi	Japan	61.31	64.35	68.18	67.37	68.96	68.99	68.99	
7	Reza Moghaddam	Iran	x	67.53	68.61	x	x	x	68.61	
8	Chandrodaya Singh	India	x	66.32	66.01	67.42	65.69	64.84	67.42	
9	Lam Wai	Hong Kong	59.36	61.58	63.87				63.87	
10	Ashraf Amgad Elseify	Qatar	x	63.29	x				63.29	
11	Kamalpreet Singh	India	59.90	59.80	63.18				63.18	
12	Arniel Ferrera	Philippines	59.03	x	61.39				61.39	
13	Kaushal Singh	India	59.30	60.65	59.69				60.65	
