= Dilshod Nazarov =

Tajikistani hammer thrower

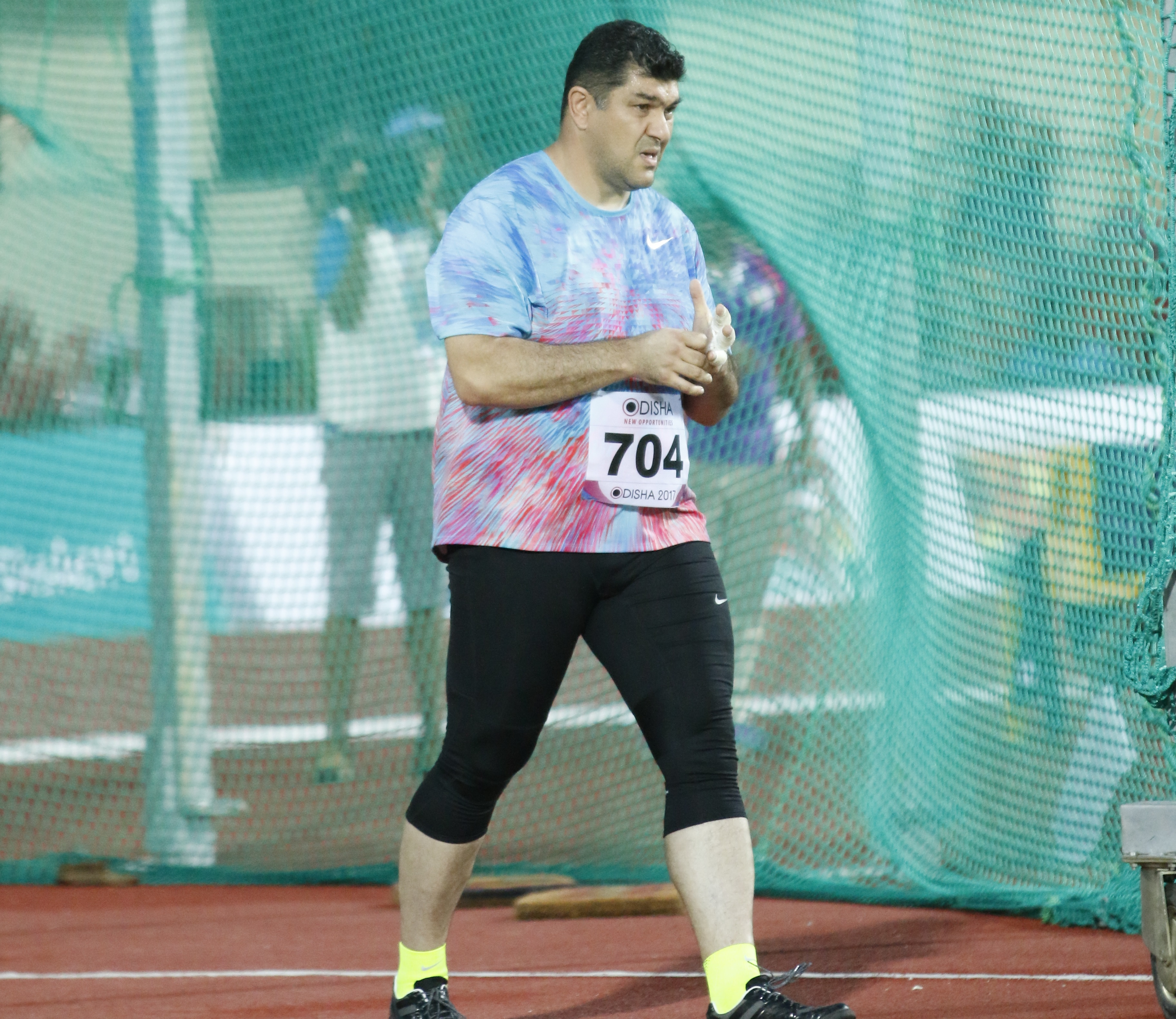
- Nazarov at the 2017 Asian Championships

Personal information
- Nationality: Tajik
- Born: 6 May 1982 (age 44) Dushanbe, Tajik SSR, Soviet Union
- Height: 1.87 m (6 ft 1 1/2 in)
- Weight: 120 kg (265 lb)

Sport
- Country: Tajikistan
- Sport: Athletics
- Event: Hammer throw
- Coached by: Yury Kuskunov
Medal record
Men's athletics
Representing Tajikistan
Olympic Games
| Gold medal – first place | 2016 Rio de Janeiro | Hammer throw |
World Championships
| Silver medal – second place | 2015 Beijing | Hammer throw |
Asian Games
| Gold medal – first place | 2006 Doha | Hammer throw |
| Gold medal – first place | 2010 Guangzhou | Hammer throw |
| Gold medal – first place | 2014 Incheon | Hammer throw |
| Silver medal – second place | 2018 Jakarta-Palembang | Hammer throw |
Asian Championships
| Silver medal – second place | 2005 Incheon | Hammer throw |
| Silver medal – second place | 2007 Amman | Hammer throw |
| Bronze medal – third place | 2003 Manila | Hammer throw |
Representing Asia-Pacific
Continental Cup
| Gold medal – first place | 2018 Ostrava | Hammer throw |
- Updated on 23 August 2015

Dilshod Jamoliddinovich Nazarov (Tajik: Dilşod Çamoliddinovic Nazarov, Persian: دلشاد نظروف‌; Russian: Дильшод Джамолиддинович Назаров, Dilshod Dzhamoliddinovich Nazarov) (born 6 May 1982) is a Tajik track and field athlete who specializes in the hammer throw. He has represented his country at the Olympic Games on four occasions (in 2004, 2008, 2012 and 2016), winning the gold medal in Rio de Janeiro, the first gold medal for Tajikistan in the history of the Olympic Games.

He has competed seven times at the World Championships in Athletics (2005 to 2017), but has been most successful at regional competitions: he won medals at four consecutive Asian Athletics Championships and was the hammer champion at the Asian Games in 2006, 2010 and 2014. He won his first global medal (a silver) in 2010 at the IAAF Continental Cup.

His personal best for the event is 80.71 metres, set in 2013.

== Career ==
=== Early career ===
Born in Dushanbe the capital of Tajikistan, his first noteworthy international result was a bronze medal at the 1997 West Asian Games. He made his debut on the global stage at the 1998 World Junior Championships in Athletics, but he did not reach the final. His first continental gold medal came at the 1999 Asian Junior Athletics Championships. He took fifth place at the 2000 World Junior Championships, an event won by 2004 Olympic bronze medalist Eşref Apak, and repeated as the continental junior champion at the 2001 Asian Junior Athletics Championships.

Nazarov then finished fourth at the 2002 Asian Championships in Colombo, and won a bronze medal the next year in Manila in a contest won by Ali Mohamed Al-Zinkawi of Kuwait. He took part in the inaugural Afro-Asian Games and managed to win the silver medal behind South African thrower Chris Harmse. Another medal came at the 2003 Central Asian Games in Dushanbe, where he took the hammer gold for the hosts.

=== Olympic debut and Asian medals ===
Participating in the 2004 Summer Olympics, he got no mark in the qualifying round and thus failed to make it through to the second round. He started the next year with an appearance at the 2005 Islamic Solidarity Games, where he took his country's sole gold medal of the tournament. In June 2005 he threw a new personal best of 77.63 metres in Almaty. At the 2005 World Championships he was again knocked out in the qualifying round, but at the 2005 Asian Championships in Incheon Nazarov won a silver medal, again behind Al-Zinkawi.

At the 2006 Asian Games Nazarov finally won a gold medal, overcoming Ali Mohamed Al-Zinkawi who had held the lead until the fifth and penultimate round. Al-Zinkawi was the pre-event favourite, having a season (and career) best of 76.97 metres while Nazarov only had a season best of 70.03 metres from Istanbul in June. The absence of 2004 Olympic champion Koji Murofushi was noted; nonetheless, Nazarov's gold medal was celebrated as the first gold medal of Tajikistan at the Asian Games in any sport. In addition it was their first Asian Games medal of any kind in athletics. Another famous hammer thrower, Andrey Abduvaliyev, did compete for Tajikistan from 1991 to 1997, winning gold medals at the World Championships in 1993 and 1995. When he won his first and only Asian Games medal, a silver at the 1998 edition, he did so as an Uzbekistani citizen. Commenting on the victory, Nazarov stated that "This is a big victory for my country".

The next year Nazarov participated in his second World Championships, but did not make it to the final round. At the 2007 Asian Championships, he won the silver medal, again behind Al-Zinkawi, this time by only one centimetre. He also improved his personal best throw to 78.89 metres, in June in Dushanbe. In 2008 he improved further, to 79.05 at a June meet in Almaty. At the 2008 Olympic Games he finished eleventh in the final.

He set a new national hammer throw record of 79.28 m in Uberlândia, Brazil. The record, set in May 2009, was enough to bring him victory over Olympic champion Primož Kozmus. He finished eleventh again at the global level at the 2009 World Championships in Athletics in Berlin. He improved to fifth place at the 2009 IAAF World Athletics Final however. He won his first continental title at the end of the year, finally beating Al-Zinkawi at the 2009 Asian Athletics Championships after a series of second-place finishes.

The following year, he improved his hammer best to 80.11 m at the Tajikistan national championships in June. Representing Asia-Pacific, he came second at the 2010 IAAF Continental Cup, finishing just behind newly crowned European Champion Libor Charfreitag. He was also runner-up in the inaugural IAAF Hammer Throw Challenge series having a combined score of 236.02 to finish behind Koji Murofushi. He repeated that placing for the second IAAF Hammer Challenge in 2011, this time finishing behind Hungary's Krisztián Pars. Nazarov placed tenth in the final at the 2011 World Championships in Athletics and ended the year with his first throw over eighty metres, recording 80.30 m to win at the Hanzekovic Memorial.

Nazarov performed less well in the 2012 season and his best throw that year was 77.70 m. He still managed to place tenth at the 2012 London Olympics, but he was down in fifth on the IAAF Challenge circuit. He rebounded at the start of 2013 by setting a personal best of 80.71 m to win at the Hallesche Werfertage meet.

On 18 March 2021, Nazarov was banned for two years by the AIU after testing positive for the banned steroid turinabol during re-analysis of samples taken from the 2011 World Championships. All of Nazarov's results from 29 August 2011 to 29 August 2013 were disqualified.

== International competitions ==
| Year | Competition | Venue | Position | Notes |
Representing Tajikistan
| 1998 | World Junior Championships | Annecy, France | 15th (q) | 60.02 m |
| 1998 | Asian Games | Bangkok, Thailand | 7th | 63.91 m |
| 1999 | Asian Junior Championships | Singapore | 1st | 63.56 m |
| 2000 | Asian Championships | Jakarta, Indonesia | 7th | 61.62 m |
| 2000 | World Junior Championships | Santiago, Chile | 5th | 63.43 m |
| 2001 | Asian Junior Championships | Bandar Seri Begawan, Brunei | 1st | 68.08 m |
| 2001 | Universiade | Beijing, China | 12th | 66.10 m |
| 2002 | Asian Championships | Colombo, Sri Lanka | 4th | 67.70 m |
| 2002 | Asian Games | Busan, South Korea | 9th | 58.39 m |
| 2003 | Asian Championships | Manila, Philippines | 3rd | 69.90 m |
| 2003 | Afro-Asian Games | Hyderabad, India | 2nd | 69.72 m |
| 2004 | Olympic Games | Athens, Greece | — | NM |
| 2005 | Islamic Solidarity Games | Mecca, Saudi Arabia | 1st | 76.98 m |
| 2005 | World Championships | Helsinki, Finland | 15th (q) | 73.38 m |
| 2005 | Asian Championships | Incheon, South Korea | 2nd | 71.38 m |
| 2006 | Asian Games | Doha, Qatar | 1st | 74.43 m |
| 2007 | Asian Championships | Amman, Jordan | 2nd | 75.70 m |
| 2007 | World Championships | Osaka, Japan | 21st (q) | 71.70 m |
| 2008 | Olympic Games | Beijing, China | 11th | 76.54 m |
| 2009 | World Championships | Berlin, Germany | 11th | 71.69 m |
| 2009 | World Athletics Final | Thessaloniki, Greece | 5th | 77.14 m |
| 2009 | Asian Championships | Guangzhou, China | 1st | 76.92 m |
| 2010 | Continental Cup | Split, Croatia | 2nd | 78.76 m |
| 2010 | Asian Games | Guangzhou, China | 1st | 76.44 m |
| 2011 | World Championships | Daegu, South Korea | DQ (10th) | 76.58 m |
| 2012 | Olympic Games | London, United Kingdom | DQ (10th) | 73.80 m |
| 2013 | Asian Championships | Pune, India | DQ (1st) | 78.32 m |
| 2013 | World Championships | Moscow, Russia | DQ (5th) | 78.31 m |
| 2014 | Asian Games | Incheon, South Korea | 1st | 76.82 m |
| 2015 | Asian Championships | Wuhan, China | 1st | 77.68 m |
| 2015 | World Championships | Beijing, China | 2nd | 78.55 m |
| 2016 | Olympic Games | Rio de Janeiro, Brazil | 1st | 78.68 m |
| 2017 | Asian Championships | Bhubaneswar, India | 1st | 76.69 m |
| 2017 | World Championships | London, United Kingdom | 7th | 77.22 m |
| 2018 | Asian Games | Jakarta, Indonesia | 2nd | 74.16 m |
| 2019 | Asian Championships | Doha, Qatar | 1st | 76.14 m |

== Personal life ==
He currently resides in Dushanbe. He is also the president of the Athletics Federation of the Republic of Tajikistan. His father Jamoliddin Nazarov was a soldier in the Tajik National Army who died in Tavildar during the Tajikistani Civil War. Dilshod's mother is a physical education teacher and coach.

== State awards ==
- Order of Glory, 2nd class (2015)
- Order of Glory, 2nd class (2016)
- Medal "For strengthening the military commonwealth" (2016)

Olympic Games
| Preceded by Mavzuna Chorieva | Flagbearer for Tajikistan; Rio de Janeiro 2016 | Succeeded by Incumbent |
