= 2003 Asian Athletics Championships – Men's hammer throw =

The men's hammer throw event at the 2003 Asian Athletics Championships was held in Manila, Philippines on September 21.

== Results ==
Rank	Name	Nationality	Result	Notes
1st place, gold medalist(s)	Ali Al-Zinkawi	Kuwait	70.64	
2nd place, silver medalist(s)	Hiroaki Doi	Japan	70.11	
3rd place, bronze medalist(s)	Dilshod Nazarov	Tajikistan	69.90	
4	Naser Abdullah Al-Jarallah	Kuwait	68.64	
5	Viktor Ustinov	Uzbekistan	66.51	
6	Lee Yun-Chul	South Korea	64.56	
7	Nadeem Khan Ahmad	Pakistan	57.60	
8	Arniel Ferrera	Philippines	54.55	
9	Wong Tee Kue	Malaysia	51.47	SB
10	Muhamad Azman	Malaysia	43.23	PB
