= Viktor Ustinov =

Uzbekistani hammer thrower

Medal record

Men's athletics

Representing Uzbekistan

Asian Championships
Bronze medal – third place	2002 Colombo	Hammer throw

Viktor Ustinov (born 20 July 1974) is a retired Uzbekistani hammer thrower.

He won the bronze medal at the 2002 Asian Championships, finished fourth at the 2002 Asian Games, finished fifth at the 2003 Asian Championships and competed at the 2000 Olympic Games without reaching the final.

His personal best throw was 75.86 metres, achieved in September 2004 in Tashkent.
