= Athletics at the 1998 Asian Games – Men's hammer throw =

Men's hammer throw at the 1998 Asian Games
- Venue: Thammasat Stadium
- Dates: 13 December 1998
- Competitors: 8 from 7 nations

Medalists
| gold medal | Koji Murofushi | Japan |
| silver medal | Andrey Abduvaliyev | Uzbekistan |
| bronze medal | Nikolay Davydov | Kyrgyzstan |

The men's hammer throw competition at the 1998 Asian Games in Bangkok, Thailand was held on 13 December at the Thammasat Stadium.

== Schedule ==
All times are Indochina Time (UTC+07:00)

| Date | Time | Event |
|---|---|---|
| Sunday, 13 December 1998 | 10:40 | Final |

== Results ==
| Rank | Athlete | Result | Notes |
|---|---|---|---|
| 1st place, gold medalist(s) | Koji Murofushi (JPN) | 78.57 | GR |
| 2nd place, silver medalist(s) | Andrey Abduvaliyev (UZB) | 77.14 | |
| 3rd place, bronze medalist(s) | Nikolay Davydov (KGZ) | 68.10 | |
| 4 | Vitaliy Khozhatelev (UZB) | 67.86 | |
| 5 | Naser Al-Jarallah (KUW) | 66.61 | |
| 6 | Ye Kuigang (CHN) | 65.73 | |
| 7 | Dilshod Nazarov (TJK) | 63.91 | |
| 8 | Anak Prasongsook (THA) | 46.82 | |
