= 2007 Asian Athletics Championships – Men's hammer throw =

The men's hammer throw event at the 2007 Asian Athletics Championships was held in Amman, Jordan, on July 25.

== Results ==
Rank	Name	Nationality	Result	Notes
1st place, gold medalist(s)	Ali Al-Zinkawi	Kuwait	75.71	
2nd place, silver medalist(s)	Dilshod Nazarov	Tajikistan	75.70	
3rd place, bronze medalist(s)	Hiroaki Doi	Japan	70.74	
4	Lee Yun-Chul	South Korea	64.51	
5	Mohamed Faraj Al-Kaabi	Qatar	64.06	
6	Mohammad Al-Jawhar	Kuwait	63.78	
7	Nirbhay Singh	India	62.54	
8	Arniel Ferrera	Philippines	55.47	
	Hou Fei	Macau	NM	
	Khaled Salah Abdelnasr Gomaa	Qatar	DNS	
