= 2005 Asian Athletics Championships – Men's hammer throw =

The men's hammer throw event at the 2005 Asian Athletics Championships was held in Incheon, South Korea on September 2.

== Results ==
Rank	Name	Nationality	Result	Notes
1st place, gold medalist(s)	Ali Al-Zinkawi	Kuwait	71.74	
2nd place, silver medalist(s)	Dilshod Nazarov	Tajikistan	71.38	
3rd place, bronze medalist(s)	Hiroaki Doi	Japan	68.50	
4	Ye Kuigang	China	68.40	
5	Lee Yun-Chul	South Korea	64.56	
6	Mohamed Al-Jawher	Kuwait	63.81	
7	Arniel Ferrera	Philippines	58.61	NR
