= Pavel Kryvitski =

Belarusian hammer thrower (born 1984)

Personal information
- Born: April 17, 1984 (age 42)
- Height: 1.84 m (6 ft 1/2 in)
- Weight: 115 kg (254 lb)

Sport
- Country: Belarus
- Sport: Athletics
- Event: Hammer throw
Medal record
Representing Belarus
European Championships
Bronze medal – third place	2014 Zürich
- Updated on 3 June 2024

Pavel Kryvitski (Belarusian: Павал Крывіцкі; born April 17, 1984) is a male hammer thrower from Belarus. He set his personal best (80.67 metres) in the men's hammer throw event on August 11, 2011 in Minsk.

== Doping ban ==
Kryvitski tested positive for growth hormones in 2015, and was subsequently given a four-year ban from sport. In addition all his results from 17 July 2012 to 16 July 2014 and since 11 May 2015 were annulled.

== International competitions ==
Year	Competition	Venue	Position	Notes
Representing Belarus
2003	European Junior Championships	Tampere, Finland	18th (q)	66.64 m
2005	European U23 Championships	Erfurt, Germany	1st	73.72 m
2009	World Championships	Berlin, Germany	8th	76.00 m
2010	European Championships	Barcelona, Spain	16th (q)	72.68 m
2011	World Championships	Daegu, South Korea	5th	78.53 m
2012	European Championships	Helsinki, Finland	9th	73.67 m
2012	Olympic Games	London, United Kingdom	–	DQ
2013	World Championships	Moscow, Russia	–	DQ
2014	European Championships	Zürich, Switzerland	3rd	78.50 m
