= 2002 Asian Athletics Championships – Men's hammer throw =

The men's hammer throw event at the 2002 Asian Athletics Championships was held in Colombo, Sri Lanka on 10 August.

== Results ==
Rank	Name	Nationality	Result	Notes
1st place, gold medalist(s)	Koji Murofushi	Japan	80.45	
2nd place, silver medalist(s)	Hiroaki Doi	Japan	70.27	
3rd place, bronze medalist(s)	Viktor Ustinov	Uzbekistan	69.25	
4	Dilshod Nazarov	Tajikistan	67.70	
5	Lee Yun-Chul	South Korea	63.53	SB
6	Ali Al-Zankawi	Kuwait	63.45	
7	Mohamed Faraj Al-Kaabi	Qatar	62.37	
8	Ho Chin-Hsien	Chinese Taipei	61.93	
9	Nirbhay Singh	India	59.32	
