= Athletics at the 2011 Summer Universiade – Men's hammer throw =

The men's hammer throw event at the 2011 Summer Universiade was held on 17 August.

== Results ==
Rank	Athlete	Nationality	#1	#2	#3	#4	#5	#6	Result	Notes
1st place, gold medalist(s)	Paweł Fajdek	Poland	77.48	77.19	x	78.14	x	76.25	78.14	
2nd place, silver medalist(s)	Marcel Lomnický	Slovakia	71.85	72.56	69.26	72.34	73.85	73.90	73.90	
3rd place, bronze medalist(s)	Lorenzo Povegliano	Italy	69.90	70.11	73.39	69.07	69.66	x	73.39	
4	Siarhei Kalamoyets	Belarus	72.23	x	70.53	70.60	70.51	69.81	72.23	
5	Dmitry Velikopolsky	Russia	x	67.33	71.58	70.43	71.11	72.17	72.17	
6	Juha Kauppinen	Finland	69.03	70.30	70.75	71.04	71.55	70.40	71.55	
7	Tuomas Seppänen	Finland	70.19	70.30	67.09	70.10	70.93	71.04	71.04	
8	Kaveh Mousavi	Iran	x	68.73	x	68.80	x	x	68.80	
9	Mirko Micuda	Croatia	67.09	x	x				67.09	
10	Alaa Elashry	Egypt	66.19	66.57	65.06				66.57	
11	Shan Changcheng	China	63.89	65.95	x				65.95	
12	Park Young-sic	South Korea	64.36	63.42	65.89				65.89	
13	Igor Vinichenko	Russia	x	x	65.78				65.78	
14	Jesús Sánchez	Paraguay	50.67	49.09	47.80				50.67	PB
	Timothy Nedow	Canada							DNS	
	Knut Syversen	Norway							DNS	
