= 2002 World Junior Championships in Athletics – Men's hammer throw =

The men's hammer throw event at the 2002 World Junior Championships in Athletics was held in Kingston, Jamaica, at National Stadium on 16 and 17 July. A 6 kg (junior implement) hammer was used.

== Medalists ==
Gold	Werner Smit; South Africa
Silver	Ali Al-Zinkawi; Kuwait
Bronze	Aleksandr Kazulka; Belarus

== Results ==
=== Final ===
17 July

Rank	Name	Nationality	Attempts						Result	Notes
Rank	Name	Nationality	1	2	3	4	5	6	Result	Notes
1st place, gold medalist(s)	Werner Smit	South Africa	74.63	x	76.43	73.74	73.39	76.03	76.43	
2nd place, silver medalist(s)	Ali Al-Zinkawi	Kuwait	73.69	x	x	x	70.02	x	73.69	
3rd place, bronze medalist(s)	Aleksandr Kazulka	Belarus	x	72.72	x	x	x	x	72.72	
4	Fabián Di Paolo	Argentina	71.48	71.22	71.26	x	69.48	x	71.48	
5	Kirill Ikonnikov	Russia	71.26	x	x	61.87	x	70.23	71.26	
6	Mohamed Al-Kaabi	Qatar	x	x	71.22	x	x	64.60	71.22	
7	Lasse Luotonen	Finland	65.95	70.47	69.33	69.69	x	50.63	70.47	
8	Frédéric Pouzy	France	x	70.42	66.49	70.38	66.38	70.03	70.42	
9	Guram Feroyev	Russia	69.65	65.42	x				69.65	
10	Timothy Driesen	Australia	67.07	x	68.34				68.34	
11	Kamilius Bethke	Germany	66.44	66.10	64.99				66.44	
12	Oleg Sinkevich	Belarus	x	x	66.07				66.07	

=== Qualifications ===
16 Jul

==== Group A ====
Rank	Name	Nationality	Attempts			Result	Notes
Rank	Name	Nationality	1	2	3	Result	Notes
1	Ali Al-Zinkawi	Kuwait	73.42	-	-	73.42	Q
2	Fabián Di Paolo	Argentina	70.47	-	-	70.47	Q
3	Timothy Driesen	Australia	68.34	x	69.59	69.59	q
4	Guram Feroyev	Russia	69.49	68.74	68.37	69.49	q
5	Kamilius Bethke	Germany	67.52	x	66.09	67.52	q
6	Oleg Sinkevich	Belarus	66.40	x	x	66.40	q
7	Jacques Koen	South Africa	x	63.90	x	63.90	
8	Jaroslaw Zabrocki	Poland	60.41	x	62.45	62.45	
9	Laslo Eperjesi	Yugoslavia	62.05	x	x	62.05	
10	Matko Tesija	Croatia	x	x	58.42	58.42	
	Mohsen Anany	Egypt	x	x	x	NM	
	Stamatis Papantoniou	Greece	x	x	x	NM	

==== Group B ====
Rank	Name	Nationality	Attempts			Result	Notes
Rank	Name	Nationality	1	2	3	Result	Notes
1	Aleksandr Kazulka	Belarus	x	75.01	-	75.01	Q
2	Werner Smit	South Africa	73.95	-	-	73.95	Q
3	Kirill Ikonnikov	Russia	71.82	-	-	71.82	Q
4	Lasse Luotonen	Finland	71.44	-	-	71.44	Q
5	Frédéric Pouzy	France	x	x	71.10	71.10	Q
6	Mohamed Al-Kaabi	Qatar	70.63	-	-	70.63	Q
7	Mohamad Al-Jowhar	Kuwait	x	63.75	65.74	65.74	
8	Massimo Marussi	Italy	x	63.27	65.37	65.37	
9	Paul Peulich	Australia	x	64.43	x	64.43	
10	Mark Newton	Germany	63.63	62.79	61.42	63.63	
11	Benjamin Siart	Austria	x	x	61.95	61.95	
	Roberto Sáez	Chile	x	x	x	NM	

== Participation ==
According to an unofficial count, 24 athletes from 18 countries participated in the event.

- Argentina (1)
- Australia (2)
- Austria (1)
- Belarus (2)
- Chile (1)
- Croatia (1)
- Egypt (1)
- Finland (1)
- France (1)
- Germany (2)
- Greece (1)
- Italy (1)
- Kuwait (2)
- Poland (1)
- Qatar (1)
- Russia (2)
- South Africa (2)
- Yugoslavia (1)
