= Ashraf Amgad El-Seify =

Qatari hammer thrower

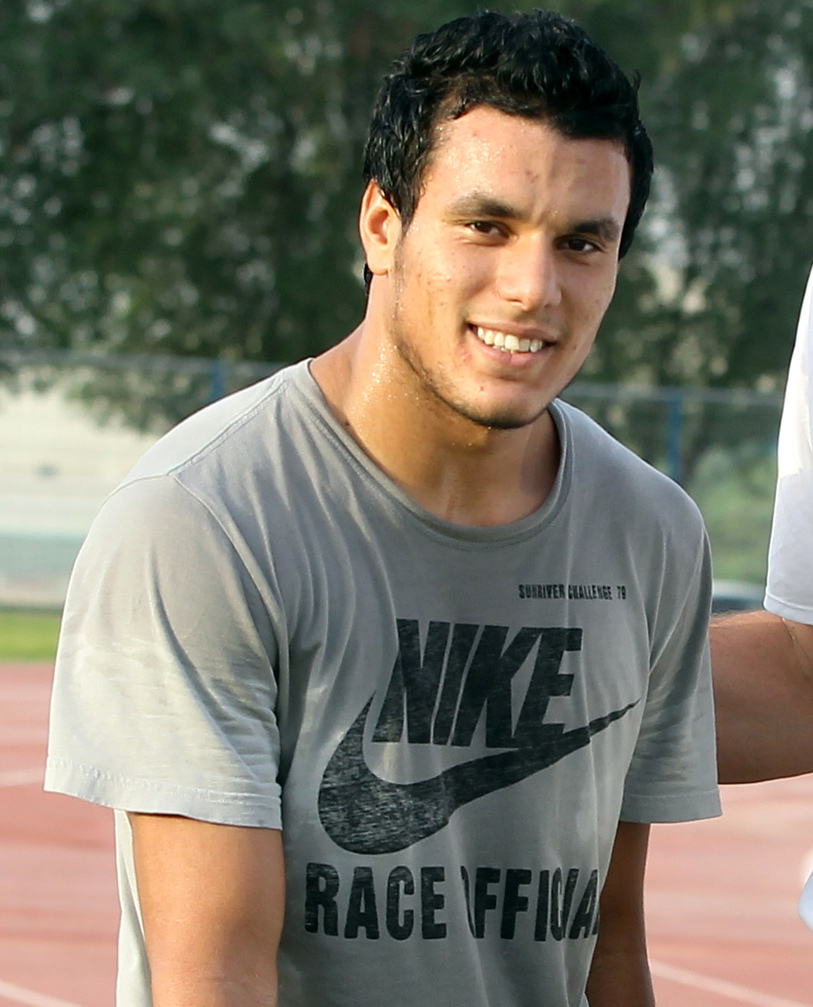

Personal information
- Native name: أشرف أمجد الصيفي
- Full name: Ashraf Amgad Elseify
- Nationality: Qatari
- Born: 20 February 1995 (age 31) Egypt

Sport
- Sport: Track and field
- Event: Hammer throw
- Coached by: Alexey Malyukov

Achievements and titles
- Personal bests: HT (7.26 kg): 78.19 m (Doha 2016); HT (6 kg): 85.57 m (Barcelona 2012) WJR; HT (5 kg): 85.26 m (Rhede 2011) WYB
Medal record
Men's athletics
Representing Qatar
Asian Games
Gold medal – first place	2018 Jakarta-Palembang	Hammer throw
World Junior Championships
Gold medal – first place	2012 Barcelona	Hammer throw
Gold medal – first place	2014 Oregon	Hammer throw
Asian Junior Championships
Gold medal – first place	2012 Colombo	Hammer throw

Ashraf Amgad Elseify (Arabic: أشرف أمجد الصيفي; born 20 February 1995) is a Qatari hammer thrower.

== Biography ==
He won a gold medal at the 2012 Asian Junior Athletics Championships in Colombo, Sri Lanka, establishing a new Asian junior record and World Youth Best.

Elseify originally hails from Egypt and was talented spotted when he won the Egyptian youth title in Cairo as a 15-year-old. He was invited to train in Qatar, under the tutelage of Russian hammer coach Alexey Malyukov.

== Achievements ==
Year	Competition	Venue	Position	Event	Notes
Representing Qatar
2012	Asian Junior Championships	Colombo, Sri Lanka	1st	Hammer throw (6 kg)	80.85 m
2012	World Junior Championships	Barcelona, Spain	1st	Hammer throw (6 kg)	85.57 m
2013	Asian Championships	Pune, India	10th	Hammer throw	63.29 m
2013	World Championships	Moscow, Russia	26th (q)	Hammer throw	69.70 m
2013	Jeux de la Francophonie	Nice, France	3rd	Hammer throw	72.88 m
2014	World Junior Championships	Eugene, Oregon, United States	1st	Hammer throw (6 kg)	84.71 m
2015	Asian Championships	Wuhan, China	2nd	Hammer throw	76.03 m
2015	World Championships	Beijing, China	9th	Hammer throw	74.09 m
2016	Olympic Games	Rio de Janeiro, Brazil	6th	Hammer throw	75.46 m
2017	Islamic Solidarity Games	Baku, Azerbaijan	3rd	Hammer throw	73.17 m
2017	World Championships	London, United Kingdom	23rd (q)	Hammer throw	71.87 m
2018	Asian Games	Jakarta, Indonesia	1st	Hammer throw	76.88 m
2019	Asian Championships	Doha, Qatar	2nd	Hammer throw	73.76 m
2019	World Championships	Doha, Qatar	9th	Hammer throw	75.41 m
2021	Arab Championships	Radès, Tunisia	2nd	Hammer throw	71.30 m
2021	Olympic Games	Tokyo, Japan	26th (q)	Hammer throw	71.84 m
2022	Islamic Solidarity Games	Konya, Turkey	5th	Hammer throw	68.14 m
2023	West Asian Championships	Doha, Qatar	1st	Hammer throw	67.87 m
2023	Arab Championships	Marrakesh, Morocco	5th	Hammer throw	65.92 m
2023	Asian Games	Hangzhou, China	2nd	Hammer throw	72.42 m
2024	West Asian Championships	Basra, Iraq	1st	Hammer throw	72.80 m
2025	Arab Championships	Oran, Algeria	1st	Hammer throw	72.98 m
2025	Asian Championships	Gumi, South Korea	5th	Hammer throw	69.82 m
2025	Islamic Solidarity Games	Riyadh, Saudi Arabia	5th	Hammer throw	71.59 m
2026	GCC Games	Doha, Qatar	1st	Hammer throw	70.18 m
