= Qi Dakai =

Chinese hammer thrower (born 1987)

Personal information
- Born: 23 May 1987 (age 39)

Sport
- Sport: Athletics
- Event: Hammer throw

Qi Dakai (Chinese: 齐大开; born 23 May 1987) is a Chinese athlete specialising in the hammer throw. He won a bronze medal at the 2013 Asian Championships.

His personal best in the event is 74.19 metres set in Pune in 2013.

== International competitions ==
Year	Competition	Venue	Position	Event	Notes
Representing China
2006	World Junior Championships	Beijing, China	6th	Hammer throw (6 kg)	75.97 m
2009	Asian Championships	Guangzhou, China	8th	Hammer throw	65.60 m
2013	Asian Championships	Pune, India	3rd	Hammer throw	74.19 m
2013	East Asian Games	Tianjin, China	3rd	Hammer throw	67.01 m
2015	Asian Championships	Wuhan, China	8th	Hammer throw	65.49 m
2015	Universiade	Gwangju, South Korea	13th	Hammer throw	63.84 m
2018	Asian Games	Jakarta, Indonesia	6th	Hammer throw	66.81 m
