= Aleksey Malyukov =

Russian hammer thrower and coach

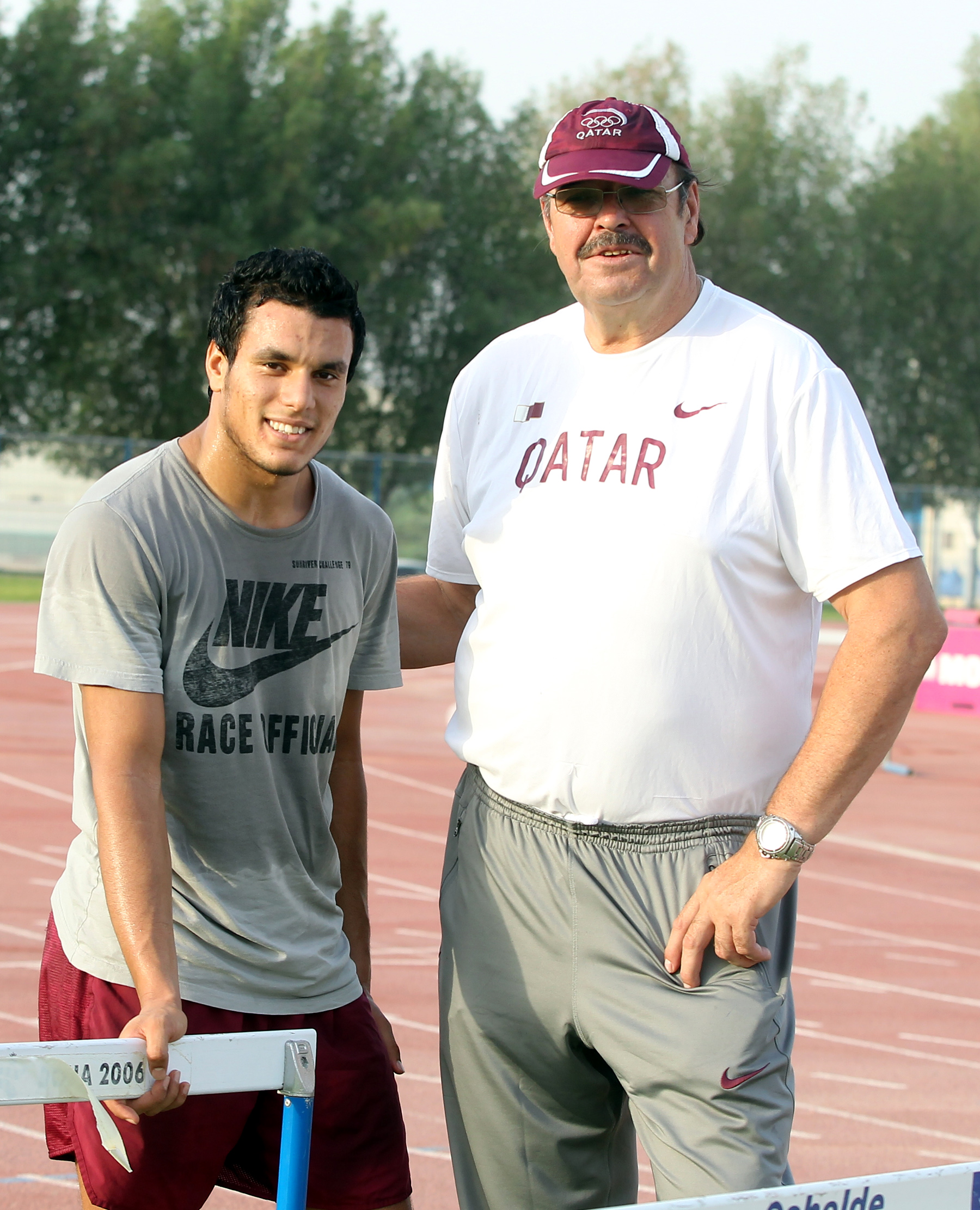
Malyukov (right) with his pupil Ashraf Amgad Elseify

Aleksey Sergeyevich Malyukov (Russian: Алексей Сергеевич Малюков; born 27 March 1950) is a Russian athletics coach and former hammer thrower. Malyukov represented the Soviet Union at the 1978 European Championships and was ranked among the world's top 10 hammer throwers four times between 1975 and 1980.

== Biography ==
Malyukov first reached the world's top 25 in 1972, when he threw 72.02 m in Kharkiv and was ranked 18th on the world season list. In 1975 he was ranked eighth in the world (and fourth in the Soviet Union) by Track & Field News; he was Soviet indoor champion in 15 kg weight throw that winter. In 1978 he had the fourth-best throw in the world at 78.32 m (behind West Germany's Karl-Hans Riehm and fellow Soviets Boris Zaychuk and Yuriy Sedykh), but at the European Championships in Prague he only managed 68.78 m and was eliminated in the qualification round. As in 1975, Track & Field News ranked him eighth in the world.

In 1979 Malyukov again placed fourth on the season list (now with 77.96 m) and took silver behind Sergey Litvinov at the Spartakiad. Track & Field News ranked him seventh in the world that year, a rank he retained in 1980; he threw his eventual personal best, 78.52 m, in Sochi on 24 May 1980.

After his throwing career Malyukov became a coach. He coached the Russian national throwing team for the 2008 Summer Olympics in Beijing. In 2010 he started coaching 15-year-old Qatari hammer talent Ashraf Amgad Elseify, who became World Junior Champion and world junior record holder under his tutelage.
