= Yevhen Vynohradov =

Ukrainian hammer thrower (born 1984)

Personal information
- Born: April 30, 1984 (age 42)
- Height: 1.95 m (6 ft 5 in)
- Weight: 105 kg (231 lb)

Sport
- Country: Ukraine
- Sport: Athletics
- Event: Hammer throw
Medal record
Men's athletics
Representing Ukraine
European Team Championships
Bronze medal – third place	2015 Cheboksary	Hammer throw

Yevhen Valeriyovych Vynohradov (Ukrainian: Євген Валерійович Виноградов; born 30 April 1984 in Vasylkiv) is a Ukrainian hammer thrower. He was born in the Kyiv Oblast, in the Ukrainian republic of the Soviet Union. His personal best throw is 80.58 metres, achieved in July 2008 in Kyiv.

He finished seventh at the 2003 European Junior Championships. He also competed at the 2007 World Championships and the 2008 Olympic Games without reaching the final.

== Doping ban ==
Vynohradov tested positive for the anabolic steroid nandrolone in an out-of-competition control 7 July 2009 and was subsequently handed a two-year ban from sport. The ban ended 7 September 2011.

== Achievements ==
Year	Competition	Venue	Position	Event	Notes
Representing Ukraine
2001	World Youth Championships	Debrecen, Hungary	26th (q)	Hammer (5 kg)	61.69 m
2003	European Junior Championships	Tampere, Finland	7th	Hammer (6 kg)	68.89 m
2005	European U23 Championships	Erfurt, Germany	6th	Hammer	68.65 m
2007	Universiade	Bangkok, Thailand	–	Hammer	NM
2007	World Championships	Osaka, Japan	15th (q)	Hammer	73.87 m
2008	Olympic Games	Beijing, China	14th (q)	Hammer	74.49 m
2013	World Championships	Moscow, Russia	18th (q)	Hammer	72.90 m
2014	European Championships	Zürich, Switzerland	–	Hammer	NM
2015	World Championships	Beijing, China	14th (q)	Hammer	74.09 m
2016	Olympic Games	Rio de Janeiro, Brazil	11th	Hammer	74.11 m
