= Wang Qi (athlete) =

Chinese athlete (born 2001)

Personal information
- Nationality: Chinese
- Born: 10 February 2001 (age 25)
- Height: 1.90 m (6 ft 3 in)

Sport
- Sport: Athletics
- Event: Hammer

Achievements and titles
- Personal bests: Hammer: 75.33m (Kladno, 2023)
Medal record
Men's athletics
Representing China
Asian Games
Gold medal – first place	2022 Hangzhou	Hammer throw
Asian Championships
Gold medal – first place	2023 Bangkok	Hammer throw
Gold medal – first place	2025 Gumi	Hammer throw

Wang Qi (born 10 February 2001) is a Chinese track and field athlete who competes in the hammer throw. He won the gold medal at the 2022 Asian Games, in Hangzhou.

== Biography ==
Wang took up the hammer throw in 2013 in Yangzhou. He started at Nanjing Normal University in 2019. In June 2023, he set a new personal best throw of 75.33m in Kladno.

In July 2023, he won gold at the 2023 Asian Athletics Championships in Bangkok with a throw of 72.13m. In August 2023, he won gold in the hammer throw at the 2023 University Games in Chengdu with a throw of 73.63 metres.

Wang won the gold medal at the 2022 Asian Games, held in Hangzhou on 30 September 2023. He triumphed with a throw of 72.97 meters. It was China's first gold in hammer throw since the 1994 Asian Games. He competed in the hammer throw at the 2024 Paris Olympics.

In May 2025, he won the gold medal in the hammer throw at the 2025 Asian Athletics Championships. In September 2025, he competed in the hammer throw at the 2025 World Championships in Tokyo, Japan. In November, he threw 73.28 m to win the 2025 Chinese National Games.
