= Shota Fukuda =

Japanese hammer thrower

Personal information
- Native name: 福田 翔大
- Nationality: Japanese
- Born: November 28, 2000 (age 25) Osaka Prefecture, Japan
- Education: Nihon University
- Occupation: Athlete

Sport
- Sport: Athletics
- Event: Hammer throw
- Club: Sumitomo Electric Industries
Medal record
Men's athletics
Representing Japan
Asian Athletics Championships
Bronze medal – third place	2023 Bangkok	Hammer throw
Bronze medal – third place	2025 Gumi	Hammer throw
Asian Throwing Championships
Gold medal – first place	2023 Mokpo	Hammer throw
Asian Games
Silver medal – second place	2026 Aichi–Nagoya	Hammer throw

Shota Fukuda (Japanese: 福田 翔大; born 28 November 2000) is a Japanese track and field athlete who specialises in the hammer throw. He represents Sumitomo Electric Industries and has won medals at the Asian Athletics Championships, Asian Throwing Championships and Asian Games.

== Career ==
Fukuda attended Osaka Toin High School before studying at Nihon University and its graduate school. He is affiliated with Sumitomo Electric Industries. His personal best in the hammer throw is 74.57 metres, achieved in July 2025 at the Japanese Athletics Championships.

In July 2023, Fukuda won the bronze medal in the men's hammer throw at the Asian Athletics Championships in Bangkok, Thailand, with a throw of 71.80 metres. Later that year, he won the gold medal in the men's hammer throw at the Asian Throwing Championships in Mokpo, South Korea, recording 72.18 metres.

Fukuda won another bronze medal at the 2025 Asian Athletics Championships in Gumi, South Korea. He finished third in the men's hammer throw with a mark of 71.89 metres. In September of that year, he competed at the World Athletics Championships in Tokyo, Japan, but did not advance beyond the qualifying round.

At the 2026 Asian Throwing Championships in Mokpo, South Korea, Fukuda finished fifth in the men's hammer throw.

In September 2026, Fukuda competed in the men's hammer throw at the 2026 Asian Games in Aichi and Nagoya, Japan. He won the silver medal with a throw of 71.78 metres, finishing behind Uzbekistan's Sukhrob Khodjaev. Following the competition, Fukuda said he was pleased to win a medal but felt that his performance did not reflect his full potential.
