= Suhrob Khodjaev =

Uzbekistani hammer thrower

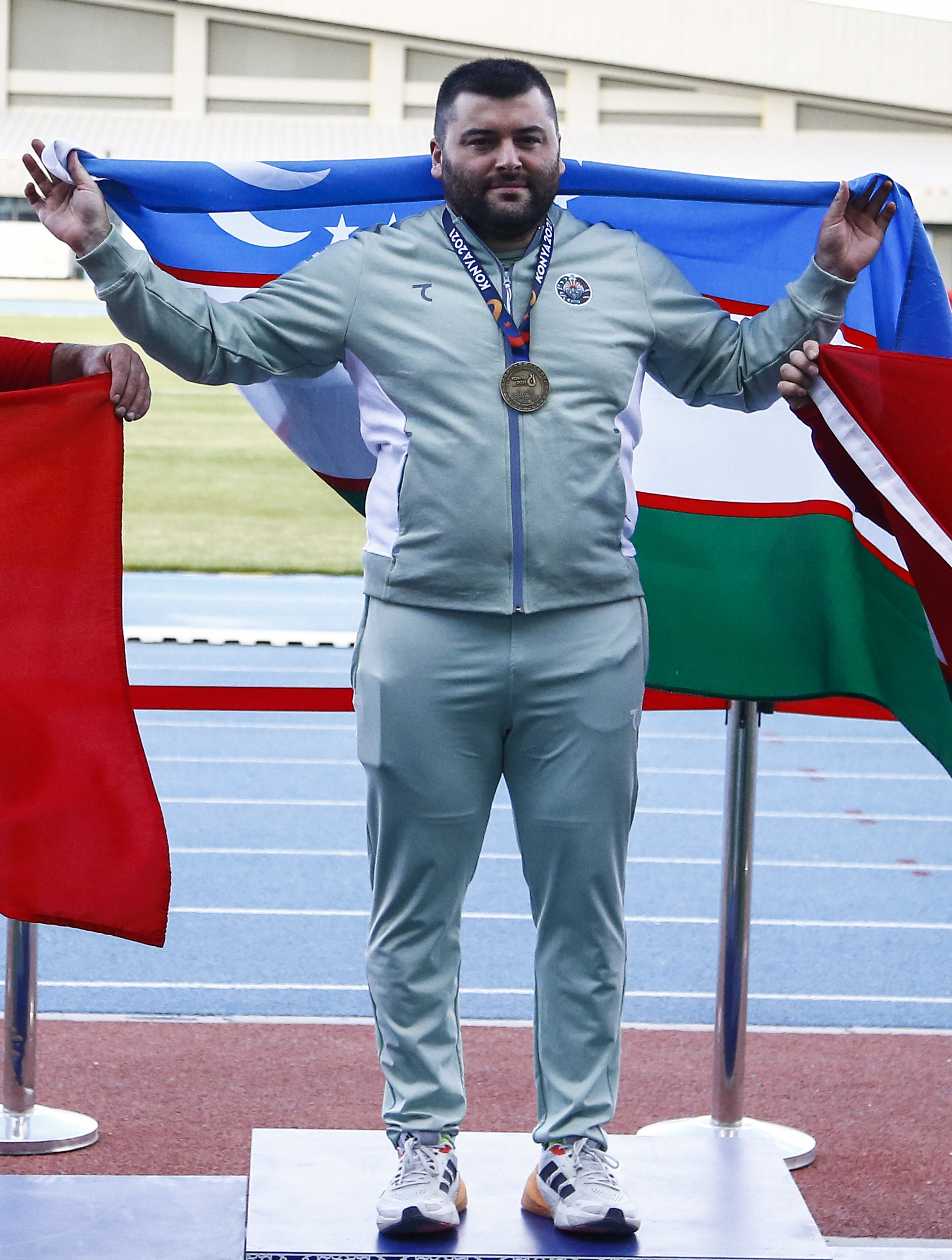
- Suhrob Khodjaev in 2022

Personal information
- Nationality: Uzbek
- Born: 21 May 1993 (age 33) Farkhor, Tajikistan
- Height: 1.86 m (6 ft 1 in)
- Weight: 105 kg (231 lb)

Sport
- Sport: Track and field
- Event: Hammer throw

Achievements and titles
- Personal bests: HT (7.3 kg): 78.22 m (Almaty 2015); HT (6 kg): 76.16 m (Barcelona 2012); HT (5 kg): 73.29 m (Brixen 2009)
Medal record
Men's athletics
Representing Uzbekistan
Asian Games
Gold medal – first place	2026 Nagoya	Hammer throw
Representing Uzbekistan
Asian Games
Gold medal – first place	2026 Nagoya	Hammer throw
Silver medal – second place	2025 Riyadh	Hammer throw
World Junior Championships
Bronze medal – third place	2012 Barcelona	Hammer throw
Representing Tajikistan
World Youth Championships
Silver medal – second place	2009 Brixen	Hammer throw

Suhrob Rustamovich Khodjaev (Tajik: Сӯҳроб Хоҷаев; born 21 May 1993) is an Uzbek hammer thrower. He was born in and originally competed for Tajikistan.

== Career ==
Khodjaev competed for Uzbekistan at the 2012 Summer Olympics. He won a bronze medal in hammer throw at the 2012 World Junior Championships in Athletics.

== Competition record ==
Year	Competition	Venue	Position	Event	Notes
Representing Tajikistan
2009	World Youth Championships	Brixen, Italy	2nd	Hammer throw (5 kg)	73.29 m
Representing Uzbekistan
2012	World Junior Championships	Barcelona, Spain	3rd	Hammer throw (6 kg)	76.16 m
2012	Olympic Games	London, United Kingdom	38th (q)	Hammer throw	65.88 m
2014	Asian Games	Incheon, South Korea	5th	Hammer throw	71.43 m
2015	Asian Championships	Wuhan, China	4th	Hammer throw	72.63 m
2015	World Championships	Beijing, China	26th (q)	Hammer throw	71.24 m
2016	Olympic Games	Rio de Janeiro, Brazil	23rd (q)	Hammer throw	70.11 m
2017	Islamic Solidarity Games	Baku, Azerbaijan	5th	Hammer throw	70.31 m
2018	Asian Games	Jakarta, Indonesia	3rd	Hammer throw	74.06 m
2019	Asian Championships	Doha, Qatar	3rd	Hammer throw	72.85 m
2021	Olympic Games	Tokyo, Japan	29th (q)	Hammer throw	71.26 m
2022	Islamic Solidarity Games	Konya, Turkey	1st	Hammer throw	71.87 m
2023	Asian Championships	Bangkok, Thailand	2nd	Hammer throw	71.83 m
2023	Asian Games	Hangzhou, China	3rd	Hammer throw	70.79 m
2025	Asian Championships	Gumi, South Korea	6th	Hammer throw	69.06 m
2025	Islamic Solidarity Games	Riyadh, Saudi Arabia	2nd	Hammer throw	74.44 m
2026	Asian Games	Nagoya, Japan	1st	Hammer throw	74.38 m
