= Mohamed Faraj Al-Kaabi =

Qatari hammer thrower

Mohamed Faraj Al-Kaabi (born 31 December 1984 in Qatar) is a male hammer thrower from Qatar. His personal best throw is 70.87 metres, achieved in April 2003 in Doha. This is the Qatari record.

== Achievements ==
Year	Competition	Venue	Position	Event	Notes
Representing Qatar
2001	World Youth Championships	Debrecen, Hungary	4th	Hammer throw (5 kg)	75.75
2001	Asian Junior Championships	Bandar Seri Begawan, Brunei	10th	Hammer throw	53.92 m
2002	World Junior Championships	Kingston, Jamaica	6th	Hammer (6 kg)	71.22 m
2002	Asian Championships	Colombo, Sri Lanka	7th	Hammer throw	62.37 m
2002	Asian Junior Championships	Bangkok, Thailand	3rd	Hammer throw (6 kg)	70.32 m
2005	West Asian Games	Doha, Qatar	3rd	Hammer throw	63.27 m
2006	Asian Games	Doha, Qatar	5th	Hammer throw	67.56 m
2007	Asian Championships	Amman, Jordan	5th	Hammer throw	64.06 m
2007	Pan Arab Games	Cairo, Egypt	5th	Hammer throw	65.81 m
2009	Asian Championships	Guangzhou, China	6th	Hammer throw	67.09 m
2010	Asian Games	Guangzhou, China	7th	Hammer throw	67.02 m
