= Ali Al-Zenkawi =

Kuwaiti hammer thrower (born 1984)

Personal information
- Nationality: Kuwaiti
- Born: February 27, 1984 (age 42) Hungary, Budapest
- Years active: 23
- Height: 1.87 m (6 ft 1 1/2 in)
- Weight: 105 kg (231 lb)
- Website: www.hammer-ali.com

Sport
- Country: Kuwait
- Sport: Athletics
- Event: Hammer throw
- Club: Al-Tadamon
- Coached by: Anatoly Bondarchuk 1999-2004 Vladimir Hudilin 2005-2008 Andri Skvaruk 2009-2012 Vladimir Hudilin 2014-2015 Andri Skvaruk 2016-2019

Achievements and titles
- World finals: 12th Osaka/Japan 2007
- Highest world ranking: 7th in IAAF top list 2009
- Personal best: 7kg : 79,74m 6kg : 78.41m 5kg : 78.78m
Medal record
Men's athletics
Representing Kuwait
Asian Championships
Gold medal – first place	2003 Manila	Hammer throw
Gold medal – first place	2005 Incheon	Hammer throw
Gold medal – first place	2007 Amman	Hammer throw

Ali Mohammed Al-Zenkawi (born 27 February 1984) is a male hammer thrower from Kuwait. His personal best throw is 79.74 metres, achieved in September 2009 in Celje.

== International competitions ==
Year	Competition	Venue	Position	Event	Notes
Representing Kuwait
2001	World Youth Championships	Debrecen, Hungary	6th	Hammer throw (5 kg)	72.91 m
2002	West Asian Games	Kuwait City, Kuwait	2nd	Hammer throw	66.01 m
2002	World Junior Championships	Kingston, Jamaica	2nd	Hammer throw (6 kg)	73.69 m
2002	Asian Championships	Colombo, Sri Lanka	6th	Hammer throw	63.45 m
2002	Asian Junior Championships	Bangkok, Thailand	1st	Hammer throw (6 kg)	74.93 m
2003	Asian Championships	Manila, Philippines	1st	Hammer throw	70.62 m
2004	Pan Arab Games	Algiers, Algeria	1st	Hammer throw	72.22 m
2004	Olympic Games	Athens, Greece	30th (q)	Hammer throw	71.06 m
2005	Islamic Solidarity Games	Mecca, Saudi Arabia	2nd	Hammer throw	71.36 m
2005	World Championships	Helsinki, Finland	19th (q)	Hammer throw	72.28 m
2005	Asian Championships	Incheon, South Korea	1st	Hammer throw	71.74 m
2006	Asian Games	Doha, Qatar	2nd	Hammer throw	73.14 m
2007	Asian Championships	Amman, Jordan	1st	Hammer throw	75.71 m
2007	World Championships	Osaka, Japan	12th	Hammer throw	76.04 m
2007	Pan Arab Games	Cairo, Egypt	2nd	Hammer throw	74.02 m
2008	Olympic Games	Beijing, China	20th (q)	Hammer throw	73.62 m
2009	World Championships	Berlin, Germany	13th (q)	Hammer throw	75.10 m
2009	World Athletics Final	Thessaloniki, Greece	8th	Hammer throw	73.61 m
2010	Continental Cup	Split, Croatia	3rd	Hammer throw	76.73 m
2010	West Asian Championships	Aleppo, Syria	1st	Hammer throw	76.72 m
2010	Asian Games	Guangzhou, China	4th	Hammer throw	68.65 m
2011	World Championships	Daegu, South Korea	13th (q)	Hammer throw	75.35 m
2011	Arab Championships	Al Ain, Emirates	1st	Hammer throw	79.27 m
2011	Pan Arab Games	Doha, Qatar	1st	Hammer throw	73.29 m
2012	Olympic Games	London, United Kingdom	18th (q)	Hammer throw	73.40 m
2012	West Asian Championships	Dubai, United Arab Emirates	1st	Hammer throw	76.14 m
2013	Asian Championships	Pune, India	1st	Hammer throw	74.70 m
2013	Islamic Solidarity Games	Palembang, Indonesia	2nd	Hammer throw	76.68 m
2014	Asian Games	Incheon, South Korea	4th	Hammer throw	72.88 m
2019	Arab Championships	Cairo, Egypt	1st	Hammer throw	73.49 m
2019	Asian Championships	Doha, Qatar	4th	Hammer throw	70.91 m
2022	GCC Games	Kuwait City, Kuwait	2nd	Hammer throw	66.97 m
2022	Islamic Solidarity Games	Konya, Turkey	6th	Hammer throw	66.98 m
2023	West Asian Championships	Doha, Qatar	2nd	Hammer throw	66.61 m
2023	Asian Games	Hangzhou, China	8th	Hammer throw	67.57 m
2025	Asian Championships	Gumi, South Korea	13th	Hammer throw	61.76 m
