= Wang Shizhu =

Chinese hammer thrower (born 1989)

Medal record

Men's athletics

Representing China

Asian Games
Silver medal – second place	2014 Incheon	Hammer throw

Wang Shizhu (Chinese: 王士筑; born 20 February 1989) is a Chinese track and field athlete who competes in the hammer throw. He has a personal best of 75.20 m (246 ft 8 1/2 in) for the event, which ranks him second among Chinese men after national record holder Bi Zhong. He was the silver medallist at the 2014 Asian Games and won the National Games of China title in 2013.

== Career ==
Raised in Liaoning, Wang took part in hammer throw from a young age and was the winner of the 2006 Chinese youth championship. He threw beyond sixty metres with the senior implement for the first time in 2007 and improved to 63.20 m (207 ft 4 in) the year after, placing seventh at the Chinese Athletics Championships. His gradual improvement continued into 2009, with a new best of 66.15 m (217 ft 1/4 in) coming at the 11th Chinese Games which was enough for sixth place. He bettered his national placing by one spot in 2010 and in 2011 he marked himself among the nations best throwers with a mark of 69.59 m (228 ft 3 3/4 in).

Wang was runner-up to Qi Dakai at the 2012 Chinese Championships. That year he had two wins on the Chinese Athletics Grand Prix circuit and was runner-up at the national university games. Qi and Wang both broke new ground in Chengdu in April 2013: Wang threw a best of 73.25 m (240 ft 3 3/4 in) while Qi went nine centimetres better – the first time two Chinese men had thrown so far in the same competition. Wang threw beyond seventy metres on several occasions that year, with his most prominent performance came at the 12th Chinese Games in his home province of Liaoning. There he became the second best Chinese male hammer thrower in history by clearing a games record mark of 75.20 m (246 ft 8 1/2 in) – only Bi Zhong (Chinese record holder since 1989) had thrown further. Out of competition, Wang received a public warning in June after a positive test for hydrochlorothiazide (a banned diuretic but a minor infraction of the doping code).

He opened 2014 with a win in Chengdu in a mark of 72.67 m (238 ft 5 in). His female counterpart, Wang Zheng, broke the Asian record at that competition. He was runner-up at the National Grand Prix Final in July and took that same position at the 2014 Asian Games, finishing behind Tajikistan's Dilshod Nazarov.
