= Mergen Mämmedow =

Turkmenistani hammer thrower

Personal information
- Nationality: Turkmen
- Born: 24 December 1990 (age 35) Jilikul, Khatlon Region, Tajikistan
- Height: 1.84 m (6 ft 1/2 in)
- Weight: 100 kg (220 lb)

Sport
- Country: Turkmenistan
- Sport: Athletics
- Event: Hammer throw
- Coached by: Haji Rahmanov
- Updated on 14 August 2012

Mergen Mamedov (born 24 December 1990) is a Turkmenistan athlete. He competed in hammer throw at the 2012 Summer Olympics in London. Master of Sport of International Class in Turkmenistan.

== Career ==
Mergen Mämmedow took up the sport in 2003 in Ashgabat, Turkmenistan. Graduated National Institute of Sports and Tourism of Turkmenistan.

Mämmedow competing at the Athletics at the 2020 Summer Olympics – Men's hammer throw Schwndke threw 67.53 m to finish 30 in qualifying heat.
