= Koji Murofushi =

Former Japanese hammer thrower

Koji Murofushi OLY
- Murofushi in 2021

Commissioner of the Japan Sports Agency
- In office 1 October 2020 – 30 September 2025
- Preceded by: Daichi Suzuki
- Succeeded by: Junichi Kawai

Personal details
- Born: 8 October 1974 (age 52) Numazu, Shizuoka, Japan
- Education: Chukyo University
- Sports career
- Employer: Mizuno Track Club
- Height: 187 cm (6 ft 2 in)
- Weight: 99 kg (218 lb)
- Country: Japan
- Sport: Athletics
- Event: Hammer throw

Sports achievements and titles
- Personal best: 84.86 m (2003)
Medal record
Men's athletics
Representing Japan
Olympic Games
| Gold medal – first place | 2004 Athens | Hammer throw |
| Bronze medal – third place | 2012 London | Hammer throw |
World Championships
| Gold medal – first place | 2011 Daegu | Hammer throw |
| Silver medal – second place | 2001 Edmonton | Hammer throw |
| Bronze medal – third place | 2003 Paris | Hammer throw |
Asian Games
| Gold medal – first place | 1998 Bangkok | Hammer throw |
| Gold medal – first place | 2002 Busan | Hammer throw |
| Silver medal – second place | 1994 Hiroshima | Hammer throw |
Asian Championships
| Gold medal – first place | 2002 Colombo | Hammer throw |
| Silver medal – second place | 1993 Manila | Hammer throw |
| Silver medal – second place | 1995 Jakarta | Hammer throw |
| Silver medal – second place | 1998 Fukuoka | Hammer throw |

Alexander Koji Murofushi (室伏 アレクサンダー広治, Murofushi Arekusandā Kōji; born 8 October 1974) is a Japanese former hammer thrower and sports scientist. He has been among the world elite since the 2001 World Championships, where he won the silver medal. He was the 2004 Olympic champion. In 2011, he was crowned world champion.

== Early life and education ==
Koji Murofushi was born on 8 October 1974 in Numazu, Shizuoka Prefecture. He is of Japanese and Romanian descent. His father, Shigenobu Murofushi is a former Olympian and held the Japanese record for 23 years before it was broken by Koji. Murofushi's sister, Yuka Murofushi, throws both hammer and discus. Murofushi's mother, Serafina Moritz, is a Romanian of Hungarian origin. She was a javelin thrower for Romania. Murofushi speaks Romanian.

Murofushi began hammer throwing at age 10, taught by his father. He attended Chukyo University, where his father coached track and field. Having an undergraduate degree in physical education, Murofushi completed his doctorate in 2007 at Chukyo University. Murofushi was accepted a faculty appointment at Chukyo University as associate professor of physical education in 2011. He joined Tokyo Medical and Dental University in 2014 and serves as professor in physical education and as director of the sports science center.

== Career ==
Before the 2001 World Championships he had made his mark in Asian athletics. He started with a bronze medal at the 1993 East Asian Games. At the Asian Championships he won silver medals in 1993, 1995. He won the silver medal at the 1994 Asian Games and then took his first title 1997 East Asian Games. A silver medal at the 1998 Asian Championship was followed by a gold medal at the 1998 Asian Games. In global events, he finished eighth at the 1992 World Junior Championships, tenth at the 1997 World Championships and ninth at the 2000 Olympic Games.

He scored gold medals at both the 2001 Goodwill Games and the 2001 East Asian Games – setting a Games record at the latter event. After the 2001 World Championships, he proceeded by winning the 2002 Asian Championships and Asian Games as well as a silver medal at the 2002 World Cup and a bronze medal at the 2003 World Championships. That year he threw 84.86 metres, which was the longest hammer throw in over ten years, putting Murofushi fourth on the all-time performer's list. Among the favorites at the 2004 Summer Olympics, he eventually won the gold medal after the disqualification of Adrián Annus.

In July 2006 he won the World Athletics Final and the World Cup. He finished sixth at the 2007 World Championships in Athletics, third at the 2007 World Athletics Final, and fifth at the 2008 Olympic Games. Two medalists, Vadim Devyatovskiy and Ivan Tsikhan, were first disqualified for failing the doping test, but won the appeal and had their medals reinstated.

At the 2009 Japanese Championships, Murofushi retained his national title, winning his fifteenth consecutive championships at the event. He increased his title total again the following year.

He made a world-leading throw of 80.99 m at the Rieti IAAF Grand Prix meeting which ranked him first place in the inaugural IAAF Hammer Throw Challenge. He remained ahead of second-placed Dilshod Nazarov at the end of the series, winning with a score of 238.52 (the combined total of his three best throws on the circuit).

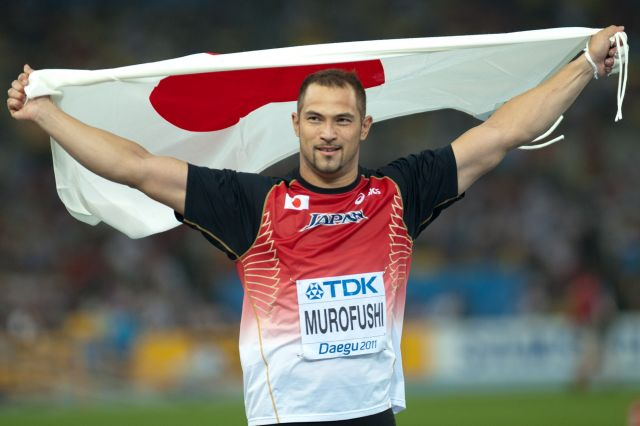
Murofushi at the 2011 World Championships in Athletics

In July 2011, the JOC (Japanese Olympic Committee) nominated Murofushi for the IOC Athletes' Commission, with the elections taking place at the 2012 Olympics. Although Murofushi collected more than enough votes to be elected, his candidacy was voided by the IOC (International Olympic Committee) due to inappropriate campaigning by the JOC during the Games.

In August 2011, Murofushi won the gold medal at the world championships, making him the oldest winner of the men's hammer world title. He also won the International Fair Play award at the same world championships.

He competed in the 2012 Summer Olympics, winning the bronze medal.

He was appointed as sports director for the Tokyo 2020 Olympic Games in June 2014.

Morofushi was appointed commissioner of the Japan Sports Agency in October 2020 and served for a five-year term.

== Record ==
=== Competition record ===
| Year | Competition | Venue | Position | Notes |
Representing Japan
| 1992 | World Junior Championships | Seoul, South Korea | 8th | 65.78 m |
| 1993 | East Asian Games | Shanghai, China | 3rd | 66.78 m |
| 1993 | Asian Championships | Manila, Philippines | 2nd | 65.54 m |
| 1994 | Asian Games | Hiroshima, Japan | 2nd | 67.48 m |
| 1995 | Asian Championships | Jakarta, Indonesia | 2nd | 69.24 m |
| 1995 | World Championships | Gothenburg, Sweden | 35th (q) | 67.06 m |
| 1995 | Universiade | Fukuoka, Japan | 15th | 67.58 m |
| 1997 | East Asian Games | Busan, South Korea | 1st | 73.40 m |
| 1997 | World Championships | Athens, Greece | 10th | 74.82 m |
| 1997 | Universiade | Catania, Italy | 8th | 73.46 m |
| 1998 | Asian Championships | Fukuoka, Japan | 2nd | 74.17 m |
| 1998 | Asian Games | Bangkok, Thailand | 1st | 78.57 m |
| 1999 | Universiade | Palma de Mallorca, Spain | 6th | 77.14 m |
| 1999 | World Championships | Seville, Spain | 14th (q) | 75.18 m |
| 2000 | Olympic Games | Sydney, Australia | 9th | 76.60 m |
| 2001 | East Asian Games | Osaka, Japan | 1st | 79.68 m |
| 2001 | World Championships | Edmonton, Canada | 2nd | 82.92 m |
| 2001 | Goodwill Games | Brisbane, Australia | 1st | 82.94 m |
| 2002 | Asian Championships | Colombo, Sri Lanka | 1st | 80.45 m |
| 2002 | Asian Games | Busan, South Korea | 1st | 78.72 m |
| 2003 | World Championships | Paris, France | 3rd | 80.12 m |
| 2004 | Olympic Games | Athens, Greece | 1st | 82.91 m |
| 2007 | World Championships | Osaka, Japan | 6th | 80.46 m |
| 2008 | Olympic Games | Beijing, China | 5th | 80.71 m |
| 2011 | World Championships | Daegu, South Korea | 1st | 81.24 m |
| 2012 | Olympic Games | London, United Kingdom | 3rd | 78.71 m |
| 2013 | World Championships | Moscow, Russia | 6th | 78.03 m |

== Distance progression ==
- 1992 65.78m (South Korea) Seoul
- 1994 67.48m (Japan) Hiroshima
- 1995 72.32m (Japan) Fukushima
- 1996 71.84m (Japan) Tokyo
- 1997 75.72m (Japan) Marugame
- 1998 78.57m (Thailand) Bangkok
- 1999 79.17m (Japan) Kumamoto
- 2000 81.08m (Japan) Yokohama
- 2001 83.47m (Japan) Toyota
- 2002 83.33m (Qatar) Doha
- 2003 84.86m (Czech Republic) Prague
- 2004 83.15m (Japan) Yokohama
- 2005 76.47m (Japan) Tokyo
- 2006 82.01m (Greece) Athens
- 2007 82.62m (Italy) Rieti
- 2008 81.87m (Japan) Nagoya
- 2009 78.36m (United States) Portland, OR
- 2010 80.99m (Italy) Rieti
- 2011 81.24m (South Korea) Daegu
- 2012 78.71m (United Kingdom) London
- 2013 78.03m (Russia) Moscow
- 2014 73.93m (Japan) Fukushima
- 2016 64.74m (Japan) Nagoya

== See also ==
- List of Olympic medalists in athletics (men)
- List of World Athletics Championships medalists (men)
- List of 2004 Summer Olympics medal winners
- List of 2012 Summer Olympics medal winners
- Hammer throw at the Olympics
- List of Japanese people
- List of hāfu people
