= 2016 Balkan Athletics Championships =

Annual track and field competition

- Dates: 25–26 June
- Host city: Pitești, Romania
- Venue: Stadionul Nicolae Dobrin
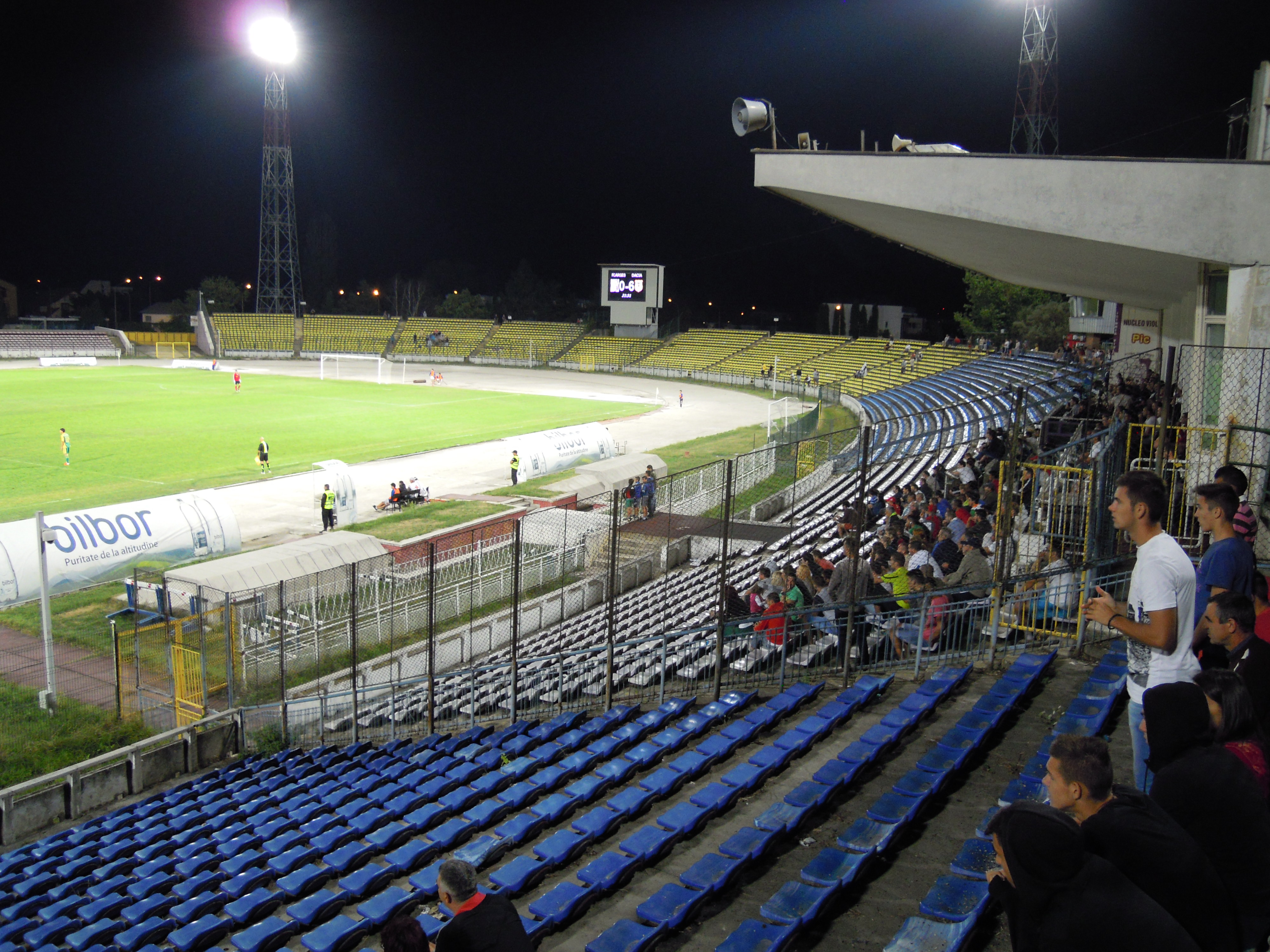
- Level: Senior
- Type: Outdoor

The 2016 Balkan Athletics Championships was the 75th edition of the annual track and field competition for athletes from the Balkans, organised by Balkan Athletics. It was held at Stadionul Nicolae Dobrin in Pitești, Romania on 25 and 26 June. The host nation Romania won the most titles at the competition, with eight, and Turkey won with most medals overall, at 23.

== Results ==
=== Men ===
Event	Gold		Silver		Bronze	
100 metres	Ramil Guliyev (TUR)	10.30	Emre Zafer Barnes (TUR)	10.32	Denis Dimitrov (BUL)	10.47
200 metres	Ramil Guliyev (TUR)	20.98	İzzet Safer (TUR)	21.16	Panagiotis Andreadis (GRE)	21.35
400 metres	Mateo Ružić (CRO)	46.31	Željko Vincek (CRO)	46.83	Alexandru Babaian (MDA)	47.41
800 metres	Amel Tuka (BIH)	1:47.69	Musa Hajdari (KOS)	1:48.55	Valentin Catalin Voicu (ROU)	1:50.16
1500 metres	Ioan Zaizan (ROU)	3:42.74	Andreas Dimitrakis (GRE)	3:44.25	Süleyman Bekmezci (TUR)	3:44.85
5000 metres	Mitko Tsenov (BUL)	14:29.86	Hakan Coban (TUR)	15:03.87	Maxim Răileanu (MDA)	15:04.93
100 m hurdles	Milan Trajkovic (CYP)	13.73	Cosmin Ilie Dumitrache (ROU)	14.01	Alexandros Stavrides (CYP)	14.37
400 m hurdles	Rusmir Malkočević (BIH)	51.47	Petros Kyriakidis (GRE)	51.97	Filip Pestic (CRO)	52.02
3000 m s'chase	Hakan Duvar (TUR)	8:40.76	Stefana Andrei Cristian (ROU)	8:51.00	Osman Junuzovic (BIH)	9:00.06
4 × 100 m relay	Turkey; Cumali Umutcan Emektaş; Furkan Sen; Abdulkadir Gögalp; Emre Zafer Barnes	39.67	Slovenia; Jan Kramberger; Gregor Kokalovič; Blaž Brulc; Ahac Moretti	40.81	Serbia; Goran Podunavac; Filip Ištvanovic; Strahinja Jovancevic; Aleksa Kijanovic	40.83
4 × 400 m relay	Turkey; Halit Kiliç; Yasmani Copello; Batuhan Altıntaş; Yavuz Can	3:04.21	Croatia; Antonio Zelić; Željko Vincek; Mateo Kovačić; Mateo Ružić	3:08.54	Bosnia and Herzegovina; Rusmir Malkočević; Semir Avdic; Abedin Mujezinovic; Amel Tuka	3:09.47
High jump	Vasílios Konstantínou (CYP)	2.23 m	Konstadinos Baniotis (GRE)	2.23 m	Milos Todosijevic (SRB) Tihomir Ivanov (BUL)	2.20 m
Pole vault	Ivan Horvat (CRO)	5.50 m	Lev Skorish (ISR)	5.00 m	Atanas Petrov (BUL)	5.00 m
Long jump	Strahinja Jovančević (SRB)	7.92 m	Cristian Iulian Staicu (ROU)	7.87 m	Alper Kulaksız (TUR)	7.84 m
Triple jump	Levon Aghasyan (ARM)	16.49 m	Tom Yakubov (ISR)	16.44 m	Momchil Karailiev (BUL)	16.24 m
Shot put	Georgi Ivanov (BUL)	20.62 m	Asmir Kolašinac (SRB)	20.02 m	Andrei Toader (ROU)	19.98 m
Discus throw	Alin Firfirică (ROU)	60.58 m	Martin Marković (CRO)	60.05 m	Roland Varga (CRO)	58.24 m
Hammer throw	Eşref Apak (TUR)	76.45 m	Serghei Marghiev (MDA)	74.89 m	Özkan Baltacı (TUR)	74.65 m
Javelin throw	Dejan Mileusnić (BIH)	77.83 m	George Catalin Zaharia (ROU)	76.17 m	Andrian Mardare (MDA)	75.72 m
Decathlon	Darko Pešić (MNE)	7827 pts	Panayiótis Mántis (GRE)	7077 pts	Aleksandar Grnovic (SRB)	7049 pts

=== Women ===
Event	Gold		Silver		Bronze	
100 metres	Ivet Lalova-Collio (BUL)	11.57	Diana Vaisman (ISR)	11.88	Lucija Pokos (CRO)	11.89
200 metres	Katerina Dalaka (GRE)	24.10	Lucija Pokos (CRO)	24.13	Andreea Ogrăzeanu (ROU)	24.25
400 metres	Tamara Salaški (SRB)	52.00	Anna Vasileiou (GRE)	52.75	Bianca Răzor (ROU)	52.89
800 metres	Florina Pierdevară (ROU)	2:04.21	Mihaela Roxana Nunu (ROU)	2:05.10	Eleni Filandra (GRE)	2:06.45
1500 metres	Claudia Bobocea (ROU)	4:16.94	Aslı Arık (TUR)	4:21.54	Dilyana Minkina (BUL)	4:23.04
5000 metres	Teodora Simović (SRB)	16:28.98	Monica Madalina Florea (ROU)	16:33.87	Anastasia Karakatsani (GRE)	16:35.80
110 m hurdles	Ivana Lončarek (CRO)	13.09	Olympia Petsoudi (GRE)	13.36	Anamaria Nesteriuc (ROU)	13.44
400 m hurdles	Katerina Dalaka (GRE)	58.27	Anna Berghii (MDA)	58.28	Elif Yıldırım (TUR)	58.78
3000 m s'chase	Ancuța Bobocel (ROU)	9:46.34	Silvia Danekova (BUL)	10:05.99	Sebahat Akpınar (TUR)	10:24.02
4 × 100 m relay	Greece; Georgia Kokloni; Elisavet Pesiridou; Olympia Petsoudi; Katerina Dalaka	44.51	Croatia; Ivana Lončarek; Lucija Pokos; Kristina Dudek; Nika Župa	45.45	Turkey; Derya Yildirim; Zeynep Baş; Yaren Acer; Berfe Sanlak	45.97
4 × 400 m relay	Romania; Adelina Pastor; Anamaria Ioniță; Andrea Miklós; Bianca Răzor	3:31.26	Greece; Konstantina Giannopoulou; Eleni Filandra; Despoia Mourta; Katerina Dalaka	3:37.48	Turkey; Emel Şanlı; Meryem Kasap; Berfe Sanlak; Meryem Kasap	3:37.72
High jump	Mirela Demireva (BUL)	1.91 m	Marija Vuković (MNE)	1.88 m	Burcu Yüksel (TUR)	1.85 m
Pole vault	Stella-Iro Ledaki (GRE)	4.10 m	Demet Parlak (TUR)	3.80 m	Elija Valentić (CRO)	3.80 m
Long jump	Nektaría Panayí (CYP)	6.49 m	Filippa Fotopoulou (CYP)	6.45 m	Efthymia Kolokytha (GRE)	6.40 m
Triple jump	Elena Panțuroiu (ROU)	14.33 m	Hanna Knyazyeva-Minenko (ISR)	14.25 m	Cristina Sandu (ROU)	13.67 m
Shot put	Radoslava Mavrodieva (BUL)	18.12 m	Emel Dereli (TUR)	17.47 m	Dimitriana Surdu (MDA)	15.45 m
Discus throw	Chrysoula Anagnostopoulou (GRE)	59.76 m	Natalia Stratulat (MDA)	56.29 m	Dimitriana Surdu (MDA)	52.63 m
Hammer throw	Zalina Petrivskaya (MDA)	73.89 m	Marina Nichișenco (MDA)	69.25 m	Kıvılcım Kaya (TUR)	68.03 m
Javelin throw	Eda Tuğsuz (TUR)	56.47 m	Mădălina-Nicoleta Anghelescu (ROU)	53.72 m	Berivan Şakir (TUR)	51.40 m
Heptathlon	Beatrice Puiu (ROU)	5 890 pts	Stella Tzikanoula (GRE)	5 135 pts	Mladena Petrušić (BIH)	4 785 pts

== Medal table ==
* Host nation (Romania)

Rank	Nation	Gold	Silver	Bronze	Total
1	Romania*	8	7	6	21
2	Turkey	7	6	10	23
3	Greece	5	8	4	17
4	Bulgaria	5	1	5	11
5	Croatia	3	5	4	12
6	Serbia	3	1	3	7
7	Cyprus	3	1	1	5
8	Bosnia and Herzegovina	3	0	3	6
9	Moldova	1	4	5	10
10	Montenegro	1	1	0	2
11	Armenia	1	0	0	1
12	Israel	0	4	0	4
13	Kosovo	0	1	0	1
13	Slovenia	0	1	0	1
Totals (14 entries)		40	40	41	121
