= 2018 Balkan Athletics Championships =

- Dates: 20–21 July
- Host city: Stara Zagora, Bulgaria
- Venue: Beroe Stadium
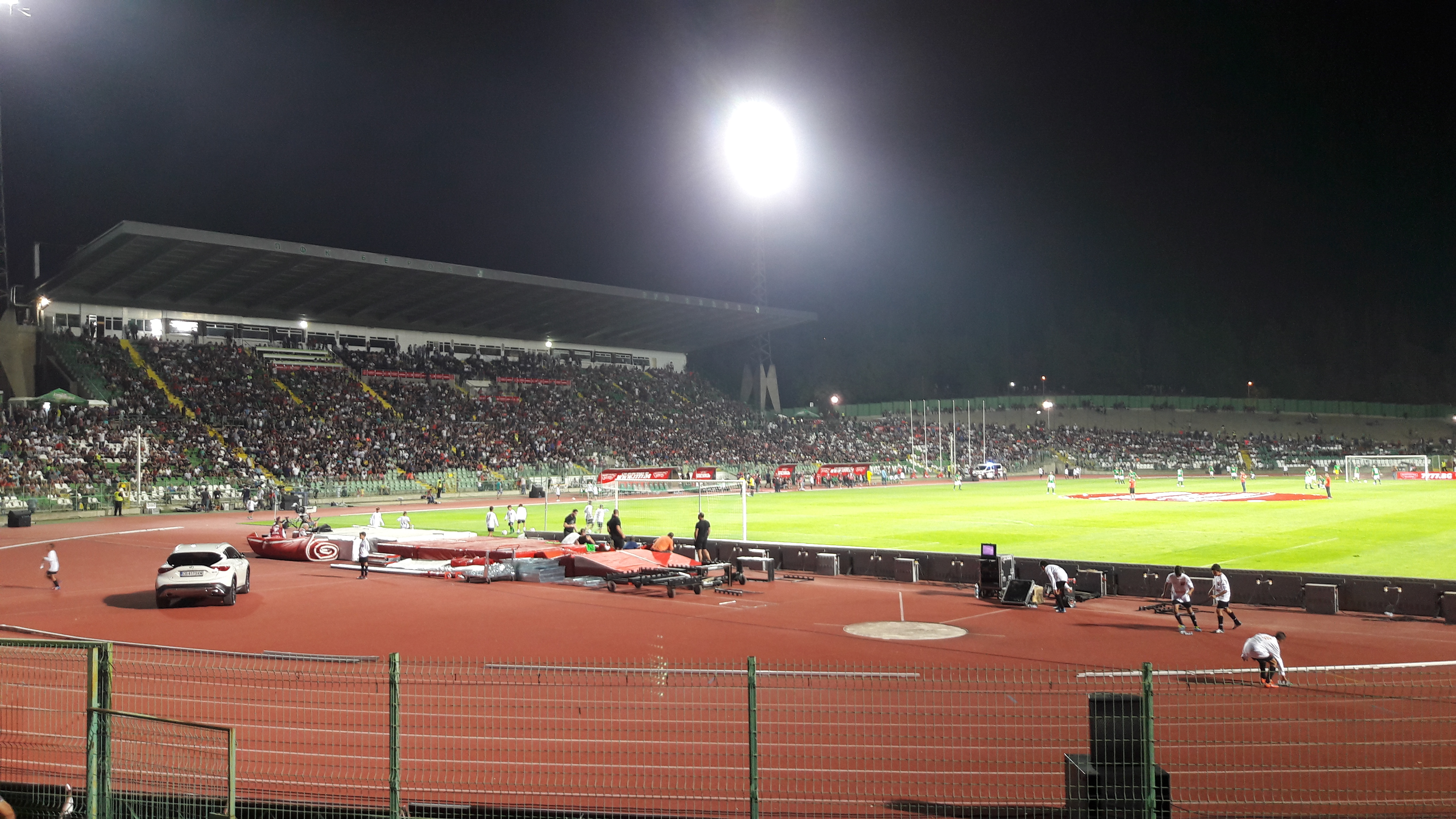
- Level: Senior
- Type: Outdoor
- Events: 40
- Participation: 610 athletes from 18 nations

The 2018 Balkan Athletics Championships was the 73rd edition of the annual track and field competition for athletes from the Balkans, organised by Balkan Athletics. It was held at Beroe Stadium in Stara Zagora, Bulgaria on 20 and 21 July. It was the fourth time that the city hosted the competition, following the 1985, 2011 and 2013 editions.

Two championship records were broken: Paraskevi Papachristou of Greece set a women's triple jump mark of 14.60 m (+ 1.7 m/s), while Serbia's Marija Vučenović set a women's javelin throw best of 60.60 m. Bulgaria's Inna Eftimova took a women's sprint double in the 100 metres and 200 metres. Florina Pierdevară of Romania was runner-up in both women's middle-distance running events and Bulgarian horizontal jumper Gabriela Petrova also won two individual silvers. Romania was the most successful nation at the competition, topping the medal table with 23 medals (nine of them gold), and were closely followed by Greece on 22 medals and eight golds.

== Results ==
=== Men ===
Event	Gold		Silver		Bronze	
100 metres Wind: -1.5 m/s	Ioannis Nifadopoulos (GRE)	10.36	Denis Dimitrov (BUL)	10.37	Ionut Andrei Neagoe (ROU)	10.42
200 metres Wind: -1.5 m/s	Panayiotis Trivyzas (GRE)	20.87	Ionut Andrei Neagoe (ROU)	20.88	Denis Dimitrov (BUL)	20.92
400 metres	Batuhan Altıntaş (TUR)	46.13	Yavuz Can (TUR)	46.37	Robert Parge (ROU)	46.44
800 metres	Sven Cepuš (CRO)	1:47.51	Musa Hajdari (KOS)	1:48.29	Cosmin Trofin (ROU)	1:48.31
1500 metres	Elzan Bibić (SRB)	3:43.36	Yervand Mkrtchyan (ARM)	3:44.55	Andreas Dimitrakis (GRE)	3:44.95
5000 metres	Chis Laviniu Madalin (ROU)	14:26.07	David Nikolli (ALB)	14:32.22	Sezgin Ataç (TUR)	14:32.73
110 m hurdles	Konstadinos Douvalidis (GRE)	13.63	Roman Suprun (UKR)	14.22	Batuhan Buğra (TUR)	14.30
400 m hurdles	Emir Bekrić (SRB)	51.05	Hrvoje Čukman (CRO)	51.15	Rusmir Malkočević (BIH)	51.90
3000 m s'chase	Mitko Tsenov (BUL)	8:45.50	Turgay Bayram (TUR)	8:55.85	Ivo Balabanov (BUL)	9:01.44
4 × 100 metres relay	Romania; Costin Homiuc; Alexandru Terpezan; Ioan Melnicescu; Petre Rezmiveș	39.48	Greece; Efthimios Stergioulis; Ioannis Nifadopoulos; Panayiotis Trivyzas; Konstadinos Douvalidis	39.84	Israel; Asaf Malka; Dayan Aviv; Imri Persiado; Gal Arad	40.29
4 × 400 metres relay	Turkey; Abdullah Tütünci; Yavuz Can; Ahmet Kasap; Batuhan Altıntaş	3:07.17	Romania; Cristian Radu; Constantin Andonii; David Nastase; Robert Parge	3:08.29	Croatia; Mateo Parlov; Hrvoje Čukman; David Šalamon; Mateo Kovačić	3:09.04
High jump	Alperen Acet (TUR)	2.24 m	Dmitry Kroyter (ISR)	2.21 m SB	Konstadinos Baniotis (GRE)	2.21 m
Pole vault	Ivan Horvat (CRO)	5.30 m	Thodoris Chrysanthopoulos (GRE)	5.10 m	Ersu Şaşma (TUR)	5.00 m
Long jump	Miltiádis Tedóglou (GRE)	8.17 m	Strahinja Jovančević (SRB)	7.70 m SB	Denis Eradiri (BUL)	7.70 m
Triple jump	Dimitrios Tsiamis (GRE)	16.67 m	Momchil Karailiev (BUL)	16.56 m SB	Georgi Tsonov (BUL)	16.16 m
Shot put	Andrei Gag (ROU)	20.19 m	Nikólaos Skarvélis (GRE)	20.12 m	Mesud Pezer (BIH)	19.72 m
Discus throw	Alin Firfirică (ROU)	63.76 m	Apóstolos Paréllis (CYP)	62.87 m	Danijel Furtula (MNE)	61.88 m
Hammer throw	Eşref Apak (TUR)	76.21 m	Mihail Anastasakis (GRE)	74.93 m	Serghei Marghiev (MDA)	72.30 m
Javelin throw	Vedran Samac (SRB)	76.80 m	George Catalin Zaharia (ROU)	75.92 m	Mark Slavov (BUL)	73.53 m
Decathlon	Darko Pešić (MNE)	7658 pts	Alexis Spyridonidis (GRE)	7336 pts	Aleksandar Grnović (SRB)	7165 pts

=== Women ===
Event	Gold		Silver		Bronze	
100 metres Wind: -1.5	Inna Eftimova (BUL)	11.45	Diana Weissman (ISR)	11.53	Olivia Fotopoulou (CYP)	11.55
200 metres Wind: -1.0	Inna Eftimova (BUL)	23.11	Olivia Fotopoulou (CYP)	23.57	Karin Okolie (BUL)	23.70
400 metres	Eléni Artymatá (CYP)	51.29	Tamara Salaški (SRB)	52.26	Bianca Răzor (ROU)	52.96
800 metres	Konstantina Giannopoulou (GRE)	2:04.65	Florina Pierdevară (ROU)	2:09.01	Jerneja Smonkar (SLO)	2:09.47
1500 metres	Lenuta Petronela Simiuc (ROU)	4:20.81	Florina Pierdevară (ROU)	4:22.94	Damla Çelik (TUR)	4:25.56
5000 metres	Teodora Simović (SRB)	16:41.80	Emine Hatun Tuna (TUR)	16:44.79	Sümeyye Erol (TUR)	16:46.18
100 m hurdles Wind: -0.6	Andrea Ivančević (CRO)	12.93	Elisavet Pesiridou (GRE)	13.04	Ivana Lončarek (CRO)	13.17
400 m hurdles	Sanda Belgyan (ROU)	56.69 PB	Elif Gören (TUR)	58.05	Emel Şanli (TUR)	59.33
3000 m s'chase	Claudia Prisecaru (ROU)	10:05.89	Sümeyye Erol (TUR)	10:11.78	Lora Ontl (CRO)	11:18.83
4 × 100 metres relay	Greece; Grigoría-Emmanouéla Keramidá; Elisavet Pesiridou; Ekaterini Sarri; Korina Politi	45.43	Romania; Ana Maria Rosianu; Ioana Teodora Gheorghe; Roxana Maria Ene; Marina Andreea Baboi	45.55	Bulgaria; Viktoriya Georgieva; Radostina Stoyanova; Karin Okolie; Inna Eftimova|	45.62
4 × 400 metres relay	Romania; Cristina Daniela Balan; Camelia Florina Gal; Sanda Belgyan; Bianca Răzor	3:33.56	Greece; Elpida Karkalatou; Despina Mourta; Evangelia Zigori; Anna Vasiliou	3:33.89	Serbia; Zorana Barjaktarović; Tamara Salaški; Bojana Kaličanin; Maja Ćirić	3:34.64
High jump	Mirela Demireva (BUL)	1.95 m	Liliia Klintsova (UKR)	1.84 m	Rümeysa Ökdem (TUR)	1.84 m PB
Pole vault	Buse Arıkazan (TUR)	4.00 m	Elija Valentić (CRO)	3.80 m	Aikaterini Vagena (GRE)	3.80 m
Long jump	Florentina Costina Iusco (ROU)	6.59 m	Gabriela Petrova (BUL)	6.48 m	Angela Moroșanu (ROU)	6.48 m
Triple jump	Paraskevi Papachristou (GRE)	14.74 m w	Gabriela Petrova (BUL)	14.34 m	Paola Borović (CRO)	13.55 m PB
Shot put	Radoslava Mavrodieva (BUL)	18.95 m PB	Dimitriana Surdu (MDA)	17.36 m	Statia Scarvelis (GRE)	15.51 m
Discus throw	Dragana Tomašević (SRB)	60.19 m	Chrysoula Anagnostopoulou (GRE)	58.76 m	Estel Valeanu (ISR)	51.46 m
Hammer throw	Zalina Petrivskaya (MDA)	71.36 m	Bianca Perie-Ghelber (ROU)	68.88 m	Stamatia Scarvelis (GRE)	68.48 m
Javelin throw	Marija Vučenović (SRB)	60.60 m CR PB	Sofia Yfantidou (GRE)	57.37 m	Florina Andreea Necşoiu (ROU)	52.24 m
Heptathlon	Mladena Petrušić (BIH)	4990 pts	Iva Aleksandrova (BUL)	4789 pts	Ljiljana Matović (MNE)	4593 pts

== Medal table ==
* Host nation (Bulgaria)

Rank	Nation	Gold	Silver	Bronze	Total
1	Romania (ROU)	9	8	6	23
2	Greece (GRE)	8	9	5	22
3	Serbia (SRB)	8	2	2	12
4	Turkey (TUR)	5	6	8	19
5	Bulgaria (BUL)*	5	5	7	17
6	Croatia (CRO)	3	2	5	10
7	Cyprus (CYP)	1	2	1	4
8	Moldova (MDA)	1	1	1	3
9	Bosnia and Herzegovina (BIH)	1	0	2	3
9	Montenegro (MNE)	1	0	2	3
11	Israel (ISR)	0	2	2	4
12	Ukraine (UKR)	0	2	0	2
13	Albania (ALB)	0	1	0	1
13	Armenia (ARM)	0	1	0	1
13	Kosovo (KOS)	0	1	0	1
16	Slovenia (SLO)	0	0	1	1
Totals (16 entries)		42	42	42	126
