= 2019 Balkan Athletics Championships =

- Dates: 2–3 September
- Host city: Pravets, Bulgaria
- Venue: Pravets Sports Complex
- Level: Senior
- Type: Outdoor
- Events: 40
- Participation: 19 nations
- Records set: 3 championship records

The 2019 Balkan Athletics Championships was the 74th edition of the annual track and field competition for athletes from the Balkans, organised by Balkan Athletics. It was held at the Pravets Sports Complex in Pravets, Bulgaria on 2 and 3 September. It was the first time that the city hosted the competition.

Three championship records were broken: both 200 metres records were improved (the men's by Ukraine's Serhiy Smelyk in 20.50 seconds, and the women's by Bulgarian Ivet Lalova-Collio, who ran 22.45 seconds), while Greek men's pole vaulter Emmanouil Karalis cleared a record height of 5.66 m. Lalova-Collio won a sprint double in the women's 100 metres and 200 m while Smelyk won golds for Ukraine in the 200 m and 4 × 100 metres relay. Ukraine was the most successful nation at the competition, topping the medal table with 18 medals (nine of them gold). Romania also won 18 medals, though only five golds. Greece, Turkey and host nation Bulgaria all won five or more gold medals.

Romanian men's throwers Andrei Gag and Alin Alexandru Firfirică successfully defended their titles. In women's jumps Mirela Demireva (high jump), Buse Arıkazan (pole vault) and Paraskevi Papachristou (triple jump) all repeated their victories from 2018. Serbia's Teodora Simović (5000 m) was the sole individual to retain a track title while her compatriot Marija Vučenović took her third straight javelin throw title.

== Results ==
=== Men ===
Event	Gold		Silver		Bronze	
100 metres	Emre Zafer Barnes (TUR)	10.48	Aleksa Kijanovic (SRB)	10.58	Antonio Ivanov (BUL)	10.66
200 metres	Serhiy Smelyk (UKR)	20.50 CR	Antonio Ivanov (BUL)	21.07	Ihor Bodrov (UKR)	21.43
400 metres	Danylo Danylenko (UKR)	46.84	Mindia Endeladze (GEO)	47.37	Oğuz Akgül (TUR)	47.68
800 metres	Oleh Myronets (UKR)	1:50.13	Musa Hajdari (KOS)	1:50.33	Christos Kotitsas (GRE)	1:50.48
1500 metres	Yervand Mkrtchyan (ARM)	3:46.00	Musa Hajdari (KOS)	3:46.54	David Nikolli (ALB)	3:47.06
5000 metres	Ilie Alexandru Corneschi (ROU)	14:51.17	Yolo Nikolov (BUL)	14:52.01	Ayetullah Aslanhan (TUR)	14:53.12
100 m hurdles	Artem Shamatryn (UKR)	14.18	Cosmin Ilie Dumitrache (ROU)	14.22	Luka Trgovčević (SRB)	14.22
400 m hurdles	Denys Nechyporenko (UKR)	50.71	Dmytro Romaniuk (UKR)	51.12	Rusmir Malkočević (BIH)	51.53
3000 m s'chase	Aras Kaya (TUR)	8:39.35	Osman Junuzović (BIH)	8:47.97	Mitko Tsenov (BUL)	8:54.97
4 × 100 m relay	Ukraine; Erik Kostrytsia; Stanislav Kovalenko; Ihor Bodrov; Serhiy Smelyk	40.40	Romania; Efthimios Stergioulis; Alexandru Terpezan; Marian Valentin Tanase; Daniel Mihai Robert Budin	41.48	Bosnia and Herzegovina; Nikola Brdar; Aleksandar Novaković; Milan Vidović; Hajrudin Vejzović	43.57
4 × 400 m relay	Turkey; Akın Özyürek; Yavuz Can; Batuhan Altıntaş; İlyas Çanakçı	3:5.85	Romania; David Nastase; Vlad Dulcescu; Mihai Cristian Pislaru; Robert Parge	3:12.43	Croatia; Mateo Parlov; Ivan Katić; Jakov Vuković; Mateo Ružić	3:14.62
High jump	Tihomir Ivanov (BUL)	2.27 m	Alperen Acet (TUR)	2.23 m	Vadym Kravchuk (UKR)	2.15 m
Pole vault	Emmanouil Karalis (GRE)	5.66 m CR	Thodoris Chrysanthopoulos (GRE)	5.45 m	Dario Prekl (CRO)	5.31 m
Long jump	Yaroslav Isachenkov (UKR)	7.89 m	Miltiádis Tedóglou (GRE)	7.88 m	Lazar Anić (SRB)	7.88 m
Triple jump	Georgi Tsonov (BUL)	17.03 m PB=	Momchil Karailiev (BUL)	16.42 m	Can Özüpek (TUR)	16.37 m
Shot put	Andrei Gag (ROU)	20.71 m	Armin Sinančević (SRB)	20.58 m	Andrei Toader (ROU)	20.30 m
Discus throw	Alin Firfirică (ROU)	63.67 m	Danijel Furtula (MNE)	62.93 m	Mykyta Nesterenko (UKR)	59.32 m
Hammer throw	Christos Frantzeskakis (GRE)	76.67 m	Mihail Anastasakis (GRE)	75.32 m	Hlib Piskunov (UKR)	74.52 m
Javelin throw	Alexandru Novac (ROU)	77.90 m	Mark Slavov (BUL)	73.84 m	Denis Picus (MDA)	72.16 m
Decathlon	Elvis Kryoukov (CYP)	7134 pts	Aleksandar Grnović (SRB)	7104 pts	Roman Razvan George (ROU)	6555 pts

=== Women ===
Event	Gold		Silver		Bronze	
100 metres	Ivet Lalova-Collio (BUL)	11.23	Diana Vaisman (ISR)	11.25 NR	Inna Eftimova (BUL)	11.56
200 metres	Ivet Lalova-Collio (BUL)	22.45 CR	Eléni Artymatá (CYP)	22.97	Rafaéla Spanoudáki-Chatziríga (GRE)	23.16 PB
400 metres	Irini Vasiliou (GRE)	51.75 PB	Eléni Artymatá (CYP)	51.77	Andrea Miklós (ROU)	52.57
800 metres	Jerneja Smonkar (SLO)	2:07.25	Jelena Gajić (BIH)	2:07.61	Natalia Evangelidou (CYP)	2:08.47
1500 metres	Natalia Evangelidou (CYP)	4:17.29	Florina Pierdevară (ROU)	4:19.75	Anna Mishchenko (UKR)	4:20.00
5000 metres	Teodora Simović (SRB)	16:36.45	Yayla Kılıç (TUR)	16:46.39	Neja Kršina (SLO)	17:05.02
110 m hurdles	Elisavet Pesiridou (GRE)	13.11	Hanna Chubkovtsova (UKR)	13.28	Oksana Shkurat (UKR)	13.34
400 m hurdles	Mariia Mykolenko (UKR)	56.45	Olena Kolesničenko (UKR)	57.59	Emel Şanli (TUR)	58.20
3000 m s'chase	Özlem Kaya (TUR)	9:54.28	Isavela Kotsacheili (GRE)	10:37.53	Chrystalla Hadjipolydorou (CYP)	10:59.70
4 × 100 m relay	Israel; Gal Kadmon; Diana Vaisman; Olga Lenskay; Ilana Dorfman	45.00	Romania; Camelia Gal; Ioana Teodora Gheorghe; Roxana Maria Ene; Marina Andreea Baboi	46.05	Not awarded	
4 × 400 m relay	Romania; Camelia Gal; Mirela Lavric; Sanda Belgyan; Andrea Miklós	3:39.52	Bulgaria; Nadezhda Racheva; Polina Todorova; Gabriela Georgieva; Kristina Borukova	3:47.83	Not awarded	
High jump	Mirela Demireva (BUL)	1.91 m	Ligia-Damaris Bara (ROU)	1.80 m	Marija Vuković (MNE)	1.80 m
Pole vault	Buse Arıkazan (TUR)	4.35 m	Eleni Claudia Polak (GRE)	4.28 m	Naama Bernstein (ISR)	4.01 m
Long jump	Milica Gardašević (SRB)	6.42 m	Efthymia Kolokytha (GRE)	6.41 m	Florentina Iusco (ROU)	6.37 m
Triple jump	Paraskevi Papachristou (GRE)	14.24 m	Aleksandra Nacheva (BUL)	13.89 m	Elena Panțuroiu (ROU)	13.81 m
Shot put	Dimitriana Surdu (MDA)	17.53 m	Olha Holodna (UKR)	17.51 m	Radoslava Mavrodieva (BUL)	16.81 m
Discus throw	Özlem Becerek (TUR)	57.47 m	Kristina Rakočević (MNE)	52.49 m	Veronika Domjan (SLO)	51.10 m
Hammer throw	Stamatia Scarvelis (GRE)	71.33 m	Bianca Florentina Ghelber (ROU)	69.96 m	Kıvılcım Kaya (TUR)	69.04 m
Javelin throw	Marija Vučenović (SRB)	57.21 m	Selena Durna (TUR)	55.48 m	Mihaela Petkova (BUL)	46.40 m
Heptathlon	Alina Shukh (UKR)	6042 pts	Beatrice Puiu (ROU)	5497 pts	Iva Aleksandrova (BUL)	4967 pts

== Medal table ==
* Host nation (Bulgaria)

Rank	Nation	Gold	Silver	Bronze	Total
1	Ukraine	9	4	5	18
2	Greece	6	6	2	14
3	Turkey	6	3	7	16
4	Romania	5	8	5	18
5	Bulgaria*	5	6	6	17
6	Serbia	4	3	2	9
7	Cyprus	2	2	2	6
8	Israel	1	1	1	3
9	Armenia	1	1	0	2
10	Croatia	1	0	2	3
10	Slovenia	1	0	2	3
12	Moldova	1	0	1	2
13	Kosovo	0	3	0	3
14	Bosnia and Herzegovina	0	2	2	4
15	Montenegro	0	2	1	3
16	Georgia	0	1	0	1
17	Albania	0	0	2	2
Totals (17 entries)		42	42	40	124
