= 2015 Balkan Athletics Indoor Championships =

- Dates: 21 February
- Host city: Istanbul, Turkey
- Venue: Ataköy Athletics Arena
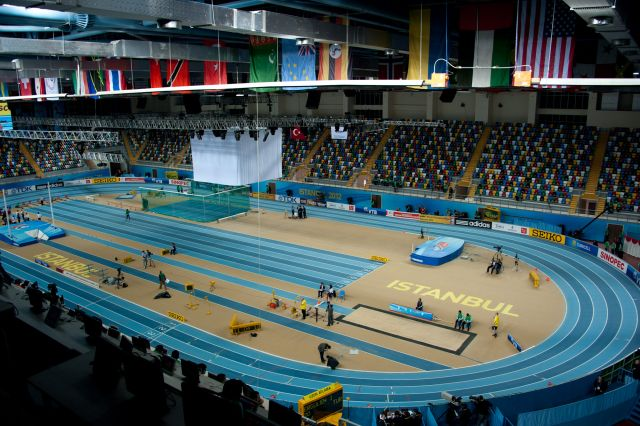
- Events: 24

The 2015 Balkan Athletics Indoor Championships was the 20th edition of the annual indoor track and field competition for athletes from the Balkans, organised by Balkan Athletics. It was held on 21 February at the Ataköy Athletics Arena in Istanbul, Turkey.

== Results ==
=== Men ===
Event	Gold		Silver		Bronze	
60 metres	Denis Dimitrov (BUL)	6.69	Cătălin Cîmpeanu (ROU)	6.71	Georgi Georgiev (BUL)	6.73
400 metres	Yavuz Can (TUR)	47.04	Batuhan Altıntaş (TUR)	47.10	Miloš Raović (SRB)	48.04
800 metres	Amel Tuka (BIH)	1:48.86 NR	Christos Dimitriou (CYP)	1:49.30 NR	Hasan Basri Guduk (TUR)	1:50.00
1500 metres	Ramazan Ozdemir (TUR)	3:44.35	Amin Chantiri (CYP)	3:45.16	Levent Ateş (TUR)	3:45.17
3000 metres	Andrei Stefana (ROU)	8:16.09	Ivan Popov (BUL)	8:16.12	Jasmin Ljajic (SRB)	8:16.15
60 m hurdles	Milan Trajkovic (CYP)	7.87	Radu Daniel Ciobanu (ROU)	8.00	David Šarančić (CRO)	8.15
4 × 400 m relay	Turkey (TUR); Batuhan Altıntaş; Mehmet Guzel; Halit Kiliç; Yavuz Can	3:14.86	Armenia (ARM); Tiykran Mkrtchyan; Roman Alksanyan; Ashot Hayraptyan; Narek Ghukasyan	3:26.76 NR	North Macedonia (MKD); Aleksandar Taheski; Gjorgi Kuzmonovski; Slave Koevski; Aleksandar Stojanovsk	3:31.61 NR
High jump	Tihomir Ivanov (BUL)	2.22 m	Andrei Mîtîcov (MDA)	2.22 NR	Alen Melon (CRO)	2.16 m
Pole vault	Nikandros Stylianou (CYP)	5.35 m	Ivan Horvat (CRO)	5.30 m	Umit Sungur (TUR)	5.10 m
Long jump	Dino Pervan (CRO)	7.57 m	Lazar Anić (SRB)	7.55 m	Michalis Mertzanidis (GRE)	7.51 m
Triple jump	Rumen Dimitrov (BUL)	16.50 m	Vladimir Letnicov (MDA)	16.31 m	Dimitrios Tsiamis (GRE)	16.27 m
Shot put	Asmir Kolašinac (SRB)	20.61 m	Georgi Ivanov (BUL)	19.79 m	Mesud Pezer (BIH)	19.36 m

=== Women ===
Event	Gold		Silver		Bronze	
60 metres	Andrea Ivančević (CRO)	7.41	Inna Eftimova (BUL)	7.42	Andreea Ogrăzeanu (ROU)	7.47
400 metres	Adelina Pastor (ROU)	53.22	Tamara Salaški (SRB)	54.03	Irini Vasiliou (GRE)	54.38
800 metres	Michaela Nunu (ROU)	2:04.93	Eleni Filandra (GRE)	2:05.46	Vania Stambolova (BUL)	2:06.14
1500 metres	Florina Pierdevară (ROU)	4:16.01	Silvia Danekova (BUL)	4:16.04	Songül Konak (TUR)	4:16.47
3000 metres	Maruša Mišmaš (SLO)	9:00.13	Claudia Bobocea (ROU)	9:03.42	Özlem Kaya (TUR)	9:04.41
60 m hurdles	Andrea Ivančević (CRO)	8.10	Elisavet Pesiridou (GRE)	8.29	Ivana Lončarek (CRO)	8.31
4 × 400 m relay	Romania (ROU); Michaela Nunu; Florina Pierdevară; Adelina Pastor; Angela Moroșanu	3:44.15	Turkey (TUR); Esir Bahar Dolek; Serai Sedurk; Sema Apak; Meriem Kasap	3:51.08	Not awarded	
High jump	Venelina Veneva-Mateeva (BUL)	1.92 m	Burcu Yüksel (TUR)	1.85 m	Marija Vuković (MNE)	1.82 m
Pole vault	Stella-Iro Ledaki (GRE)	4.30 m	Lorela Manou (GRE)	4.20 m	Buse Arıkazan (TUR)	4.00 m
Long jump	Florentina Marincu (ROU)	6.44 m	Serpil Koçak (TUR)	6.05 m	Haido Alexouli (GRE)	6.04 m
Triple jump	Andriana Bânova (BUL)	13.91 m	Elena Panțuroiu (ROU)	13.56 m	Saša Babšek (SLO)	13.47 m
Shot put	Emel Dereli (TUR)	17.55 m	Radoslava Mavrodieva (BUL)	17.34 m	Dimitriana Surdu (MDA)	15.44 m
