= 2017 Balkan Athletics Championships =

- Dates: 15–16 July
- Host city: Novi Pazar, Serbia
- Venue: Novi Pazar Athletics Stadium
- Level: Senior
- Type: Outdoor
- Participation: 16 nations

The 2017 Balkan Athletics Championships was the 76th edition of the annual track and field competition for athletes from the Balkans, organised by Balkan Athletics. It was held at Novi Pazar Athletics Stadium in Novi Pazar, Serbia on 15 and 16 July. The host nation Serbia won the most titles at the competition, with nine, and also shared the highest medal total with Romania, at 21. Romania finished top of the team points table.

== Results ==
=== Men ===
Event	Gold		Silver		Bronze	
100 metres (Wind: +2.2 m/s)	Jak Ali Harvey (TUR)	10.11 w	Ioannis Nyfadopoulos (GRE)	10.22 w	Denis Dimitrov (BUL)	10.40 w
200 metres (Wind: +1.1 m/s)	Jak Ali Harvey (TUR)	20.56	Panayiotis Trivyzas (GRE)	20.92	Imri Persiado (ISR)	21.01
400 metres	Mateo Ružić (CRO)	47.22	Stefan Vukadinović (SRB)	49.03	Stjepan Bojanić (SRB)	49.07
800 metres	Abedin Mujezinović (BIH)	1:51.75	Ion Siuris (MDA)	1:52.11	Hasan Basri Güdük (TUR)	1:52.17
1500 metres	Mitko Tsenov (BUL)	3:50.81	Levent Ateş (TUR)	3:51.16	Nikolay Parvanov (BUL)	3:51.39
5000 metres	Yolo Nikolov (BUL)	14:33.35	Cihat Ulus (TUR)	14:37.01	Vasile-Daniel Suciu (ROU)	14:41.83
100 m hurdles	Cosmin Ilie Dumitrache (ROU)	14.06	Mustafa Güneş (TUR)	14.29	Batuhan Buğra Eruygun (TUR)	14.36
400 m hurdles	Yann Senjarić (CRO)	51.42	Nagy Attila Csongor (ROU)	52.13	Peter Hribaršek (SLO)	52.43
3000 m s'chase	Osman Junuzović (BIH)	8:56.09	Nicolai Gorbusco (MDA)	9:00.61	Resul Çevik (TUR)	9:06.18
4 × 100 m relay	Romania; Serban Marius Florin; Alexandru Terpezan; Ionuț Neagoe; Budin Daniel Mihai	40.62	Slovenia; Tilen Ovniček; Jan Kramberger; Blaž Brulc; Luka Marolt	40.95	Israel; Asaf Malka; Aviv Dayan; Omri Harush; Imri Persiado	41.16
4 × 400 m relay	Serbia; Stjepan Bojanić; Igor Garaj; Ivan Marković; Stefan Vukadinović	3:15.92	Romania; Serban Marius Florin; Madalin Dorian Gheban; Nagy Attila Csongor; Pavel Nichituş	3:20.66	Albania; Daniel Limani; Marko Makaj; Florian Lata; Edison Muço	3:27.36
High jump	Konstadinos Baniotis (GRE)	2.14 m	Dan Claudiu Lazarica (ROU)	2.14 m	Georgios Tessaromatis (GRE)	2.14 m
Pole vault	Ivan Horvat (CRO)	5.50 m	Thodoris Chrysanthopoulos (GRE)	5.30 m	Nikandros Stylianou (CYP)	5.10 m
Long jump	Lazar Anić (SRB)	7.94 m	Strahinja Jovančević (SRB)	7.75 m	Bachana Khorava (GEO)	7.56 m
Triple jump	Momchil Karailiev (BUL)	16.82 m	Georgi Tsonov (BUL)	16.62 m	Marian Oprea (ROU)	15.93 m
Shot put	Mesud Pezer (BIH)	20.11 m	Hamza Alić (BIH)	19.60 m	Asmir Kolašinac (SRB)	19.45 m
Discus throw	Martin Marić (CRO)	61.20 m	Andreas Christou (CYP)	60.14 m	Sergiu Ursu (ROU)	57.55 m
Hammer throw	Özkan Baltacı (TUR)	71.92 m	Ayhan Apti (BUL)	67.29 m	Boris Yordanov (BUL)	62.75 m
Javelin throw	Branko Pauković (SRB)	75.82 m	Paraskevás Batzávalis (GRE)	73.97 m	Dejan Mileusnić (BIH)	73.37 m
Decathlon	Aleksandar Grnović (SRB)	7 225 pts	Urban Čehovin (SLO)	7 058 pts	Dragan Pešić (MNE)	6 777 pts

=== Women ===
Event	Gold		Silver		Bronze	
100 metres (Wind: +0.4 m/s)	Katerina Dalaka (GRE)	11.72	Milana Tirnanic (SRB)	11.82	Katarina Sirmić (SRB)	11.93
200 metres (Wind: +1.0 m/s)	Grigoryia-Emmanouella Keramida (GRE)	23.35	Bianca Răzor (ROU)	23.62	Camelia Florina Ga (ROU)	24.00
400 metres	Bianca Răzor (ROU)	52.76	Anna Vasileiou (GRE)	53.79	Maja Ćirić (SRB)	53.38
800 metres	Amela Terzić (SRB)	2:07.25	Konstantina Giannopoulou (GRE)	2:08.16	Lenuta Petronela Simiuc (ROU)	2:10.63
1500 metres	Amela Terzić (SRB)	4:19.00	Anthi Kyriakopoulou (GRE)	4:22.01	Lenuta Petronela Simiuc (ROU)	4:23.09
5000 metres	Cristina Negru (ROU)	16:36.98	Şeyma Yıldız (TUR)	16:40.88	Teodora Simović (SRB)	17:46.92
110 m hurdles	Elisavet Pesiridou (GRE)	13.16	Anamaria Nesteriuc (ROU)	13.19	Anamaria Ioniță (ROU)	13.37
400 m hurdles	Elif Yıldırım (TUR)	58.67	Katerina Dalaka (GRE)	58.87	Emel Şanlı (TUR)	59.15
3000 m s'chase	Adela Bălțoi (ROU)	10:29.27	Fatma Demir (TUR)	10:35.12	Slađana Perunović (MNE)	11:02.41
4 × 100 m relay	Serbia; Ivana Petković; Katarina Sirmić; Tamara Vuletic; Milana Tirnanić	46.34	Romania; Ana Maria Roșianu; Anamaria Ioniță; Anamaria Nesteriuc; Ene Roxana	46.45	Macedonia; Kristina Josifovska; Katarina Timchevska; Aiše Halili; Valbona Selimi	50.54
4 × 400 m relay	Romania; Camelia Florina Ga; Anamaria Ioniță; Ene Roxana; Bianca Răzor	3:37.29	Serbia; Marina Banovic; Kristina Dudek; Marija Hizman; Anita Banovic	3:43.90	Macedonia; Marija Jovanoska; Kristina Josifovska; Aiše Halili; Katarina Timchevska	4:09.84
High jump	Tatiana Gousin (GRE)	1.91 m	Mirela Demireva (BUL)	1.88 m	Marija Vuković (MNE)	1.84 m
Pole vault	Maria Aristotelous (CYP)	4.00 m	Buse Arıkazan (TUR)	3.80 m	Ionela Denisa Luca (ROU)	3.80 m
Long jump	Chaido Alexouli (GRE)	6.41 m	Milica Gardašević (SRB)	6.38 m	Milena Mitkova (BUL)	6.30 m
Triple jump	Carmen Toma (ROU)	13.65 m	Kristína Alvertsián (GRE)	13.36 m	Petra Koren (SLO)	13.10 m
Shot put	Dimitriana Surdu (MDA)	17.86 m	Radoslava Mavrodieva (BUL)	17.62 m	Evangelia Sofiani (GRE)	15.31 m
Discus throw	Dragana Tomašević (SRB)	59.35 m	Chrysoula Anagnostopoulou (GRE)	58.05 m	Kristina Rakočević (MNE)	52.12 m
Hammer throw	Zalina Petrivskaya (MDA)	69.03 m	Tuğçe Şahutoğlu (TUR)	65.87 m	Marina Nichișenco (MDA)	64.61 m
Javelin throw	Marija Vučenović (SRB)	56.41 m	Bernarda Letnar (SLO)	52.27 m	Tatjana Mirković (SRB)	51.83 m
Heptathlon	Mladena Petrušić (BIH)	4 796 pts	Nikolija Stanivuković (BIH)	4 585 pts	Sanja Ristovic (SRB)	4 518 pts

== Medal table ==
* Host nation (Serbia)

Rank	Nation	Gold	Silver	Bronze	Total
1	Serbia*	9	5	7	21
2	Romania	7	6	8	21
3	Greece	6	10	2	18
4	Turkey	4	7	4	15
5	Bosnia and Herzegovina	4	2	1	7
6	Croatia	4	0	0	4
7	Bulgaria	3	4	4	11
8	Moldova	2	2	1	5
9	Cyprus	1	1	1	3
10	Slovenia	0	3	2	5
11	Montenegro	0	0	4	4
12	Israel	0	0	2	2
12	North Macedonia	0	0	2	2
14	Albania	0	0	1	1
14	Georgia	0	0	1	1
Totals (15 entries)		40	40	40	120

== Participation ==
- Albania
- Armenia
- Bosnia and Herzegovina
- Bulgaria
- Croatia
- Cyprus
- Georgia
- Greece
- Macedonia
- Israel
- Montenegro
- Moldova
- Romania
- Turkey
- Slovenia
- Serbia
