= 2021 European Athletics U23 Championships – Men's hammer throw =

Men's hammer throw at the 2021 European Athletics U23 Championships
- Venue: Kadriorg Stadium, Tallinn
- Dates: 8–9 July
- Competitors: 19 from 13 nations
- Winning distance: 77.88

Medalists
gold medal	Mykhaylo Kokhan	Ukraine
silver medal	Christos Frantzeskakis	Greece
bronze medal	Ragnar Carlsson	Sweden

The men's hammer throw event at the 2021 European Athletics U23 Championships was held in Tallinn, Estonia, at Kadriorg Stadium on 8 and 9 July.

== Records ==
Prior to the competition, the records were as follows:

European U23 record	Olli-Pekka Karjalainen (FIN)	81.70	Lahti, Finland	16 June 2002
Championship U23 record	Nicolas Figère (FRA)	80.88	Amsterdam, Netherlands	15 July 2001

== Results ==
=== Qualification ===
Qualification rule: 71.00 (Q) or the 12 best results (q) qualified for the final.

Rank	Group	Name	Nationality	#1	#2	#3	Results	Notes
1	A	Mykhaylo Kokhan	Ukraine	74.07			74.07	Q
2	A	Giorgio Olivieri	Italy	x	68.10	71.16	71.16	Q
3	B	Hugo Tavernier	France	69.21	70.88	x	70.88	q
4	B	Ragnar Carlsson	Sweden	x	x	70.67	70.67	q
5	B	Mykhailo Havryliuk	Ukraine	68.91	70.25	70.54	70.54	q
6	A	Christos Frantzeskakis	Greece	69.99	x	x	69.99	q
7	B	Gábor Czeller	Hungary	66.30	67.85	x	67.85	q
8	A	Donát Varga	Hungary	x	66.85	67.44	67.44	q
9	A	Mihăiță Andrei Micu	Romania	63.33	67.39	x	67.39	q
10	B	Markelo Mema	Greece	61.64	64.81	66.41	66.41	q
11	A	Earwyn Abdou	France	65.01	65.90	65.38	65.90	q
12	A	Dzianis Shabasau	Belarus	x	64.40	65.67	65.67	q
13	B	Benedek Doma	Hungary	64.33	x	65.19	65.19	
14	B	Ben Hawkes	Great Britain	x	x	65.06	65.06	
15	B	Batuhan Hizal	Turkey	64.24	x	64.38	64.38	
16	B	Lasha-Giorgi Gurgenidze	Georgia	63.25	x	64.25	64.25	
17	A	Halil Yılmazer	Turkey	x	63.67	64.17	64.17	
18	A	Sean Mockler	Ireland	x	x	63.95	63.95	
19	B	Hans Barrett	Denmark	x	61.80	x	61.80	

=== Final ===
Rank	Name	Nationality	#1	#2	#3	#4	#5	#6	Result	Notes
1st place, gold medalist(s)	Mykhaylo Kokhan	Ukraine	76.76	77.14	77.88	x	76.99	x	77.88	
2nd place, silver medalist(s)	Christos Frantzeskakis	Greece	72.94	x	75.23	71.26	x	74.40	75.23	
3rd place, bronze medalist(s)	Ragnar Carlsson	Sweden	70.92	71.54	x	73.85	x	x	73.85	
4	Mykhailo Havryliuk	Ukraine	71.25	72.67	73.18	x	x	72.73	73.18	
5	Giorgio Olivieri	Italy	x	x	71.11	71.95	x	71.47	71.95	
6	Hugo Tavernier	France	71.51	x	69.97	70.82	69.74	69.03	71.51	
7	Gábor Czeller	Hungary	61.72	x	66.38	x	67.84	65.06	67.84	
8	Mihăiță Andrei Micu	Romania	66.04	64.48	67.43	x	67.04	65.81	67.43	
9	Earwyn Abdou	France	64.85	66.29	62.71				66.29	
10	Donát Varga	Hungary	65.67	x	x				65.67	
11	Dzianis Shabasau	Belarus	x	65.07	65.29				65.29	
12	Markelo Mema	Greece	x	60.73	x				60.73	
