= 2018 IAAF World U20 Championships – Men's hammer throw =

Men's hammer throw at the 2018 World U20 Championships
- Venue: Ratina Stadium
- Dates: 11 July (qualification); 13 July (final)
- Competitors: 31 from 22 nations
- Winning distance: 80.65 m

Medalists
gold medal	Jake Norris	Great Britain
silver medal	Mykhaylo Kokhan	Ukraine
bronze medal	Mykhailo Havryliuk	Ukraine

The men's hammer throw at the 2018 IAAF World U20 Championships was held at Ratina Stadium on 11 and 13 July.

== Records ==
Standing records prior to the 2018 IAAF World U20 Championships in Athletics
World U20 Record	Ashraf Amgad Elseify (QAT)	85.57	Barcelona, Spain	14 July 2012
Championship Record	Ashraf Amgad Elseify (QAT)	85.57	Barcelona, Spain	14 July 2012
World U20 Leading	Christos Frantzeskakis (GRE)	81.32	Tripoli, Greece	5 May 2018

== Results ==
=== Qualification ===
The qualification round took place on 11 July in two groups, with Group A starting at 12.20 and Group B starting at 13:40. Athletes attaining a mark of at least 74.00 metres ( Q ) or at least the 12 best performers ( q ) qualified for the final.

Rank	Group	Name	Nationality	Round			Mark	Notes
Rank	Group	Name	Nationality	1	2	3	Mark	Notes
1	A	Jake Norris	Great Britain	73.44	76.95		76.95	Q
2	A	Ragnar Carlsson	Sweden	71.12	75.18		75.18	Q
3	A	Hugo Tavernier	France	x	74.45		74.45	Q, PB
4	A	Mykhaylo Kokhan	Ukraine	74.15			74.15	Q
5	B	Mykhailo Havryliuk	Ukraine	73.71	72.28	x	73.71	q
6	B	Valentin Andreev	Bulgaria	71.28	70.14	72.44	72.44	q
7	B	Donát Varga	Hungary	71.72	x	x	71.72	q
8	B	Ashish Jakhar	India	x	70.52	70.33	70.52	q
9	A	James Joycey	Australia	67.60	70.38	68.80	70.38	q, SB
10	B	Fabio Hessling	Germany	x	69.88	x	69.88	q
11	B	Bayley Campbell	Great Britain	69.75	x	x	69.75	q
12	B	Earwyn Abdou	France	x	68.46	x	68.46	q
13	B	Mihaita-Andrei Micu	Romania	67.98	67.98	66.34	67.98	
14	B	Aimar-Genís Palma	Spain	x	x	67.74	67.74	
15	A	Damneet Singh	India	67.48	x	x	67.48	
16	B	Giorgio Olivieri	Italy	x	x	67.29	67.29	
17	A	Dzianis Shabasau	Belarus	66.63	x	x	66.63	
18	A	Gábor Czeller	Hungary	x	66.30	x	66.30	
19	A	Rúben Antunes	Portugal	x	66.01	x	66.01	
20	A	Hans Barrett	Denmark	65.70	63.95	x	65.70	
21	B	Masanobu Hattori	Japan	65.70	x	x	65.70	
22	A	Lasha Giorgi Gurgenidze	Georgia	x	65.62	x	65.62	
23	B	Veikka Koskinen	Finland	x	64.68	x	64.68	
24	B	Michael Feldman	United States	64.01	60.17	59.53	64.01	
25	A	Khalil Bedoui	Qatar	x	63.67	x	63.67	
26	B	Davit Ochigava	Georgia	63.60	63.10	62.04	63.60	
27	A	Konstantinos Zaltos	Greece	63.49	x	61.83	63.49	
28	A	Aitor Urkía	Spain	x	60.08	x	60.08	
29	A	Steven Feldman	United States	x	58.89	58.77	58.89	
	A	Miguel Ángel Zamora	Cuba	x	x	x	NM	
	B	Christos Frantzeskakis	Greece	x	x	x	NM	

=== Final ===
The final took place on 13 July at 17:50.

Rank	Name	Nationality	Round						Mark	Notes
Rank	Name	Nationality	1	2	3	4	5	6	Mark	Notes
1st place, gold medalist(s)	Jake Norris	Great Britain	x	73.18	78.17	80.65	74.55	80.55	80.65	NU20R
2nd place, silver medalist(s)	Mykhaylo Kokhan	Ukraine	x	x	74.37	x	79.68	x	79.68	PB
3rd place, bronze medalist(s)	Mykhailo Havryliuk	Ukraine	75.00	75.98	76.23	x	74.43	77.71	77.71	PB
4	Ragnar Carlsson	Sweden	x	72.59	77.62	74.09	x	x	77.62	NU20R
5	Hugo Tavernier	France	75.70	x	75.44	75.37	75.99	74.20	75.99	PB
6	Ashish Jakhar	India	72.56	74.59	72.69	71.46	72.39	74.34	74.59	
7	Donát Varga	Hungary	66.89	70.80	x	x	x	71.99	71.99	
8	Bayley Campbell	Great Britain	71.28	71.21	58.56	66.42	x	x	71.28	
9	Fabio Hessling	Germany	69.44	70.57	x				70.57	
10	Valentin Andreev	Bulgaria	x	x	68.59				68.59	
11	Earwyn Abdou	France	x	x	66.08				66.08	
12	James Joycey	Australia	63.61	x	63.92				63.92	
