= 2017 European Athletics Team Championships Super League =

Athletics team competitions

These are the complete results of the 2017 European Team Championships Super League on 23–25 June 2017 in Lille, France. Compared with earlier editions, several special regulations were in effect, including a maximum of three attempts in throwing disciplines as well as the long jump and triple jump, with only the leading four athletes granted a fourth attempt. In addition, athletes in the high jump and pole vault were allowed no more than four total failures.

== Background ==
- Czech Republic, Greece and Netherlands were promoted from 2015 First League.
- Due to Russia's suspension, the competition is staged with 11 teams only and Russia is one of the three teams to be relegated to the European Athletics Team Championships First League 2019.

== Men ==
=== 100 metres ===
==== Qualification ====
Qualification: First 3 in each heat (Q) and the next 2 fastest (q) advance to the Final

Rank	Heat	Lane	Name	Nationality	React	Time	Notes	Points
1	1	4	Harry Aikines-Aryeetey	Great Britain	0.185	10.33	Q	
2	1	5	Julian Reus	Germany	0.145	10.36	Q	
3	2	5	Churandy Martina	Netherlands	0.157	10.39	Q	
4	2	7	Lykourgos-Stefanos Tsakonas	Greece	0.152	10.39	Q	
5	2	3	Stuart Dutamby	France	0.127	10.52	Q	
6	1	3	Federico Cattaneo	Italy	0.219	10.54	Q	
7	2	4	Ángel David Rodríguez	Spain	0.128	10.58	q	
8	1	3	Zdeněk Stromšík	Czech Republic	0.246	10.60	q	
9	2	2	Dominik Kopeć	Poland	0.246	10.70		3
10	1	6	Volodymyr Suprun	Ukraine	0.199	10.78		2
11	2	6	Dzianis Konanau	Belarus	0.180	10.88		1

==== Final ====
Rank	Lane	Name	Nationality	React	Time	Notes	Points
1	6	Harry Aikines-Aryeetey	Great Britain	0.121	10.21		11
2	4	Julian Reus	Germany	0.121	10.27		10
3	3	Churandy Martina	Netherlands	0.148	10.30		9
4	5	Lykourgos-Stefanos Tsakonas	Greece	0.133	10.37		8
5	1	Ángel David Rodríguez	Spain	0.151	10.39		7
6	2	Zdeněk Stromšík	Czech Republic	0.131	10.43		6
7	8	Federico Cattaneo	Italy	0.134	10.47		5
8	7	Stuart Dutamby	France	0.125	10.48		4

=== 200 metres ===
==== Qualification ====
Qualification: First 3 in each heat (Q) and the next 2 fastest (q) advance to the Final

Rank	Heat	Lane	Name	Nationality	React	Time	Notes	Points
1	1	7	Lykourgos-Stefanos Tsakonas	Greece	0.168	20.33	Q, SB	
2	1	3	Serhiy Smelyk	Ukraine	0.157	20.75	Q	
3	1	6	Sam Miller	Great Britain	0.192	20.88	Q	
4	1	5	Aleixo-Platini Menga	Germany	0.172	20.90	q	
5	2	7	Karol Zalewski	Poland	0.185	21.00	Q	
6	2	2	Pavel Maslák	Czech Republic	0.178	21.04	Q	
7	2	3	Mickael-Meba Zeze	France	0.201	21.16	Q	
8	1	4	Óscar Husillos	Spain	0.174	21.20	q	
9	2	4	Solomon Bockarie	Netherlands	0.136	21.25		3
10	2	5	Antonio Infantino	Italy	0.161	21.29		2
11	2	6	Stanislau Darahakupets	Belarus	0.160	21.66		1

==== Final ====
Rank	Lane	Name	Nationality	Time	Notes	Points
1	3	Serhiy Smelyk	Ukraine	20.53	SB	11
2	7	Mickael-Meba Zeze	France	20.57		10
3	4	Likourgos-Stefanos Tsakonas	Greece	20.59		9
4	6	Pavel Maslák	Czech Republic	20.66		8
5	8	Sam Miller	Great Britain	20.79	PB	7
6	5	Karol Zalewski	Poland	20.87	SB	6
7	1	Aleixo Platini Menga	Germany	20.90		5
8	2	Óscar Husillos	Spain	20.97		4

=== 400 metres ===
==== Qualification ====
Qualification: First 3 in each heat (Q) and the next 2 fastest (q) advance to the Final

Rank	Heat	Lane	Name	Nationality	React	Time	Notes	Points
1	2	7	Davide Re	Italy	0.169	45.85	Q	
2	1	7	Dwayne Cowan	Great Britain	0.215	46.04	Q	
3	2	6	Teddy Atine-Venel	France	0.205	46.12	Q	
4	2	3	Liemarvin Bonevacia	Netherlands	0.200	46.36	Q	
5	1	6	Rafał Omelko	Poland	0.252	46.38	Q	
6	1	3	Samuel García	Spain	0.184	46.79	Q	
7	1	5	Johannes Trefz	Germany	0.181	46.96	q	
8	2	5	Vitaliy Butrym	Ukraine	0.187	47.13	q	
9	1	4	Patrik Šorm	Czech Republic	0.244	47.25		3
10	2	4	Maksim Hrabarenka	Belarus	0.199	48.32	PB	2
11	2	2	Mihaíl Pappás	Greece	0.631	48.65		1

==== Final ====
Rank	Lane	Name	Nationality	React	Time	Notes	Points
1	5	Dwayne Cowan	Great Britain	0.134	45.46	PB	11
2	4	Rafał Omelko	Poland	0.211	45.53		10
3	3	Davide Re	Italy	0.160	45.56	PB	9
4	7	Samuel García	Spain	0.116	45.60	SB	8
5	6	Teddy Atine-Venel	France	0.187	45.93		7
6	1	Johannes Trefz	Germany	0.153	46.54		6
7	2	Vitaliy Butrym	Ukraine	0.152	46.95		5
	8	Liemarvin Bonevacia	Netherlands	0.157	DQ	R 162.7	4

=== 800 metres ===
Rank	Name	Nationality	Time	Notes	Points
1	Thijmen Kupers	Netherlands	1:47.18		11
2	Giordano Benedetti	Italy	1:47.94		10
3	James Bowness	Great Britain	1:48.19		9
4	Yevhen Hutsol	Ukraine	1:48.26	PB	8
5	Yan Sloma	Belarus	1:48.32		7
6	Álvaro de Arriba	Spain	1:48.54		6
7	Filip Šnejdr	Czech Republic	1:48.61		5
8	Samir Dahmani	France	1:48.65		4
9	Christoph Kessler	Germany	1:48.89		3
10	Athanasios Kalakos	Greece	1:52.27		2
	Adam Kszczot	Poland	DQ	R 163.3b	0

=== 1500 metres ===
Rank	Name	Nationality	Time	Notes	Points
1	Marcin Lewandowski	Poland	3:53.40		11
2	Jake Wightman	Great Britain	3:53.72		10
3	Timo Benitz	Germany	3:54.28		9
4	Mahiedine Mekhissi-Benabbad	France	3:54.54		8
5	Filip Sasínek	Czech Republic	3:54.56		7
6	Marc Alcalá	Spain	3:54.89		6
7	Joao Bussotti Neves	Italy	3:55.36		5
8	Vincent Hazeleger	Netherlands	3:55.90		4
9	Volodymyr Kyts	Ukraine	3:55.90		3
10	Andréas Dimitrákis	Greece	3:57.18		2
11	Artsiom Lohish	Belarus	3:57.87		1

=== 3000 metres ===
Rank	Name	Nationality	Time	Notes	Points
1	Jakub Holuša	Czech Republic	7:57.60		11
2	Marc Scott	Great Britain	7:58.52	PB	10
3	Carlos Mayo	Spain	7:58.97	PB	9
4	Yoann Kowal	France	7:59.61		8
5	Marcel Fehr	Germany	8:00.52	SB	7
6	Yassin Bouih	Italy	8:01.80		6
7	Stanislav Maslov	Ukraine	8:02.11	SB	5
8	Richard Douma	Netherlands	8:08.24	PB	4
9	Michał Rozmys	Poland	8:11.90		3
10	Andreas Dimitrakis	Greece	8:16.63	PB	2
11	Artsiom Lohish	Belarus	8:37.54		1

=== 5000 metres ===
Rank	Name	Nationality	Time	Notes	Points
1	Antonio Abadía	Spain	13:59.40		11
2	Nick Goolab	Great Britain	13:59.72		10
3	Amanal Petros	Germany	13:59.83		9
4	Marouan Razine	Italy	14:02.62		8
5	Szymon Kulka	Poland	14:04.59		7
6	Félix Bour	France	14:05.11		6
7	Yehor Zhukov	Ukraine	14:15.26	SB	5
8	Uladzislau Pramau	Belarus	14:16.98	PB	4
9	Konstadínos Gelaoúzos	Greece	14:22.41	PB	3
10	Bart van Nunen	Netherlands	14:24.77	SB	2
11	Jakub Zemaník	Czech Republic	14:48.83		1

=== 3000 metres steeplechase ===
Rank	Name	Nationality	Time	Notes	Points
1	Mahiedine Mekhissi-Benabbad	France	8:26.71		11
2	Sebastián Martos	Spain	8:27.46		10
3	Krystian Zalewski	Poland	8:33.02		9
4	Rob Mullett	Great Britain	8:33.99		8
5	Abdoullah Bamoussa	Italy	8:38.12		7
6	Tim Stegemann	Germany	8:42.77		6
7	Siarhei Litouchyk	Belarus	8:47.62		5
8	Noah Schutte	Netherlands	8:53.09		4
9	Nikolaos Gotsis	Greece	8:59.20	PB	3
10	Lukáš Oleinícek	Czech Republic	8:59.61		2
11	Roman Rostykus	Ukraine	9:15.09		1

=== 110 metres hurdles ===
==== Qualification ====
Qualification: First 3 in each heat (Q) and the next 2 fastest (q) advance to the Final

Rank	Heat	Lane	Name	Nationality	React	Time	Notes	Points
1	1	7	David Omoregie	Great Britain	0.149	13.34	Q, SB	
2	1	5	Orlando Ortega	Spain	0.137	13.36	Q	
3	2	2	Damian Czykier	Poland	0.152	13.48	Q	
4	2	3	Aurel Manga	France	0.148	13.52	Q	
5	1	3	Konstadínos Douvalídis	Greece	0.173	13.54	Q	
6	1	4	Koen Smet	Netherlands	0.137	13.65	q, SB	
7	2	5	Erik Balnuweit	Germany	0.144	13.76	Q	
8	2	4	Lorenzo Perini	Italy	0.145	13.77	q	
9	1	6	Vitali Parakhonka	Belarus	0.160	13.85		3
10	2	7	Václav Sedlák	Czech Republic	0.134	13.98		2
11	2	6	Artem Shamatryn	Ukraine	0.160	14.33		1

==== Final ====
Rank	Lane	Name	Nationality	React	Time	Notes	Points
1	3	Orlando Ortega	Spain	0.155	13.20	=CR	11
2	5	Aurel Manga	France	0.124	13.35		10
3	4	David Omoregie	Great Britain	0.124	13.36		9
4	6	Damian Czykier	Poland	0.110	13.40		8
5	8	Konstadinos Douvalidis	Greece	0.141	13.42	SB	7
6	7	Erik Balnuweit	Germany	0.138	13.60		6
7	2	Lorenzo Perini	Italy	0.147	13.62	=PB	5
8	1	Koen Smet	Netherlands	0.161	13.66		4

=== 400 metres hurdles ===
==== Qualification ====
Qualification: First 3 in each heat (Q) and the next 2 fastest (q) advance to the Final

Rank	Heat	Lane	Name	Nationality	React	Time	Notes	Points
1	1	3	Jack Green	Great Britain	0.235	49.96	Q	
2	2	4	Sergio Fernández	Spain	0.238	50.28	Q	
3	2	2	José Reynaldo Bencosme	Italy	0.193	50.42	Q	
4	2	7	Vít Müller	Czech Republic	0.193	50.47	Q	
5	1	5	Patryk Dobek	Poland	0.227	50.53	Q	
6	1	4	Ludvy Vaillant	France	0.236	50.62	Q	
7	2	5	Felix Franz	Germany	0.257	51.06	q	
8	1	6	Danylo Danylenko	Ukraine	0.267	51.30	q	
9	1	7	Nick Smidt	Netherlands	0.250	51.32		3
10	2	6	Mikita Yakauleu	Belarus	0.220	51.58		2
11	2	3	Konstadínos Nákos	Greece	0.417	52.16		1

==== Final ====
Rank	Lane	Name	Nationality	React	Time	Notes	Points
1	5	Jack Green	Great Britain	0.145	49.47		11
2	3	Sergio Fernández	Spain	0.125	49.72		10
3	6	Patryk Dobek	Poland	0.173	49.79		9
4	4	José Reynaldo Bencosme	Italy	0.148	49.85		8
5	7	Ludvy Vaillant	France	0.197	50.02		7
6	8	Vít Müller	Czech Republic	0.206	50.85		6
7	2	Felix Franz	Germany	0.187	50.95		5
8	1	Danylo Danylenko	Ukraine	0.221	51.03		4

=== 4 × 100 metres ===
Rank	Final	Lane	Nation	Athletes	React	Time	Notes	Points
1	A	4	Great Britain	Chijindu Ujah, Zharnel Hughes, Danny Talbot, Harry Aikines-Aryeetey	0.209	38.08	CR	11
2	A	5	Germany	Julian Reus, Robert Hering, Roy Schmidt, Aleixo-Platini Menga	0.138	38.30		10
3	A	7	France	Ben Bassaw, Gautier Dautremer, Mickael-Meba Zeze, Guy-Elphège Anouman	0.123	38.68		9
4	B	6	Ukraine	Roman Kravtsov, Emil Ibrahimov, Volodymyr Suprun, Serhiy Smelyk	0.105	39.07		8
5	B	3	Netherlands	Giovanni Codrington, Churandy Martina, Wouter Brus, Roelf Bouwmeester	0.142	39.07		7
6	B	4	Italy	Antonio Infantino, Eseosa Desalu, Gaetano Di Franco, Hillary Wanderson Polanco Rijo	0.163	39.08		6
7	A	6	Poland	Dominik Kopeć, Przemysław Słowikowski, Karol Zalewski, Dariusz Kuć	0.200	39.21		5
8	B	5	Greece	Konstadinos Zikos, Konstadinos Douvalidis, Panayiotis Trivizas, Ioannis Nifadopoulos	0.119	39.42		4
9	A	3	Czech Republic	Dominik Záleský, Jan Veleba, Jan Jirka, Zdenek Stromšík	0.178	39.73		3
10	B	7	Belarus	Yahor Papou, Stanislau Darahakupets, Illia Siratsiuk, Dzianis Konanau	0.197	40.05		2
11	A	2	Spain	Adrián Pérez, Javier Sanz, Daniel Cerdan, Ángel David Rodríguez	0.188	40.05		1

=== 4 × 400 metres ===
Rank	Final	Lane	Nation	Athletes	React	Time	Notes	Points
1	B	6	Spain	Óscar Husillos, Lucas Bua, Darwin Andrés Echeverry, Samuel García	0.127	3:02.32	EL	11
2	B	7	Netherlands	Maarten Stuivenberg, Liemarvin Bonevacia, Terrence Agard, Bjorn Blauwhof	0.107	3:02.37	NR	10
3	B	5	Czech Republic	Jan Tesař, Pavel Maslák, Vít Müller, Patrik Šorm	0.146	3:03.31		9
4	A	4	Poland	Łukasz Krawczuk, Michał Pietrzak, Jakub Krzewina, Rafał Omelko	0.180	3:03.86		8
5	A	3	France	Gilles Biron, Thomas Jordier, Mamoudou Hanne, Yoan Décimus	0.159	3:03.92		7
6	A	6	Germany	Patrick Schneider, Torben Junker, Johannes Trefz, Constantin Schmidt	0.121	3:04.64		6
7	A	2	Italy	Vladimir Aceti, Michele Tricca, Brayan Lopez, Eseosa Desalu	0.195	3:06.35		5
8	A	7	Ukraine	Danylo Danylenko, Yevhen Hutsol, Oleksiy Pozdnyakov, Vitaliy Butrym	0.120	3:07.03		4
9	A	5	Great Britain	Rabah Yousif, Sam Miller, Jarryd Dunn, Cameron Chalmers	0.170	3:07.49		3
10	B	4	Greece	Georgios Labropoulos, Petros Kiriakidis, Konstadinos Koutsoukis, Mihail Pappas	0.208	3:08.58		2
11	B	3	Belarus	Ihar Zubko, Mikita Yakauleu, Aliaksandr Krasouski, Maksim Hrabarenka	0.126	3:09.84		1

=== High jump ===
Rank	Name	Nationality	2.07	2.12	2.17	2.22	2.26	2.30	Mark	Notes	Points
1	Mickaël Hanany	France	–	o	o	xo	xxo	xxx	2.26	SB	11
2	Marco Fassinotti	Italy	–	o	xo	o	xxx		2.22		10
3	Eike Onnen	Germany	–	o	o	xo	xxx		2.22		9
4	Konstadinos Baniotis	Greece	o	o	xo	xo	xx		2.22		7.5
4	Norbert Kobielski	Poland	o	o	xo	xo	xx		2.22		7.5
6	Dmytro Dem'yanyuk	Ukraine	–	xo	xo	xx			2.17		6
7	Pavel Seliverstau	Belarus	–	xxo	xo	x			2.17		5
8	Douwe Amels	Netherlands	o	o	xxx				2.12		3.5
8	Chris Baker	Great Britain	–	o	xxx				2.12		3.5
10	Martin Heindl	Czech Republic	–	xxo	xx				2.12		2
11	Miguel Ángel Sancho	Spain	xo	xxo	x				2.12		1

=== Pole vault ===
Rank	Name	Nationality	4.80	5.00	5.15	5.30	5.45	5.55	5.65	5.70	5.80	5.91	Mark	Notes	Points
1	Renaud Lavillenie	France	–	–	–	–	–	xo	–	xo	o	xxx	5.80		11
2	Igor Bychkov	Spain	–	o	–	xo	–	xo	–	xx			5.55		9.5
2	Hendrik Gruber	Germany	–	–	–	o	xo	xo	xx				5.55		9.5
4	Jan Kudlička	Czech Republic	–	–	–	xo	–	xxo	x				5.55		8
5	Piotr Lisek	Poland	–	–	–	o	o	xx–	x				5.45		7
6	Menno Vloon	Netherlands	–	–	–	o	x–	xx					5.30		6
7	Dimitrios Patsoukakis	Greece	–	o	xx–	o	xx						5.30		5
8	Luke Cutts	Great Britain	–	–	–	xo	xxx						5.30		4
9	Claudio Michel Stecchi	Italy	–	o	o	xxo	xx						5.30		2.5
9	Ivan Yeryomin	Ukraine	–	o	o	xxo	xx						5.30		2.5
11	Uladzislau Chamarmazovich	Belarus	o	xo	xo	xx							5.15		1

=== Long jump ===
Rank	Name	Nationality	#1	#2	#3	#4	Mark	Notes	Points
1	Dan Bramble	Great Britain	x	7.79	8.00	x	8.00	=SB	11
2	Eusebio Cáceres	Spain	7.96	x	x	7.83	7.96		10
3	Radek Juška	Czech Republic	7.74	7.86	7.78	x	7.86		9
4	Tomasz Jaszczuk	Poland	7.72	7.84	x	7.82	7.84		8
5	Miltiádis Tentóglou	Greece	7.61	7.60	7.76		7.76		7
6	Kafétien Gomis	France	7.61	7.33	7.70		7.70		6
7	Kevin Ojiaku	Italy	7.20	7.39	7.54		7.54		5
8	Kanstantsin Barycheuski	Belarus	7.37	7.43	7.39		7.43		4
9	Taras Neledva	Ukraine	7.27	7.39	7.20		7.39		3
10	Julian Howard	Germany	7.39	x	x		7.39		2
11	Steven Nuytinck	Netherlands	7.28	7.18	7.31		7.31		1

=== Triple jump ===
Rank	Name	Nationality	#1	#2	#3	#4	Mark	Notes	Points
1	Max Heß	Germany	16.84	17.02	15.15	x	17.02	=SB	11
2	Ben Williams	Great Britain	16.35	x	16.73	x	16.73	SB	10
3	Pablo Torrijos	Spain	15.98	16.71	16.28	16.04	16.71		9
4	Jean-Marc Pontvianne	France	16.42	x	16.58	16.06	16.58		8
5	Dimitrios Tsiamis	Greece	16.55	16.55	x		16.55		7
6	Dzmitry Platnitski	Belarus	16.52	x	16.21		16.52	SB	6
7	Karol Hoffmann	Poland	16.08	16.42	16.07		16.42		5
8	Oleksandr Malosilov	Ukraine	16.27	16.12	16.03		16.27		4
9	Fabrizio Donato	Italy	15.98	x	–		15.98		3
10	Fabian Florant	Netherlands	15.32	15.44	15.56		15.56		2
11	Jiří Zeman	Czech Republic	14.67	13.25	15.07		15.07		1

=== Shot put ===
Rank	Name	Nationality	#1	#2	#3	#4	Mark	Notes	Points
1	Tomáš Staněk	Czech Republic	20.27	21.63	x	–	21.63	=CR	11
2	David Storl	Germany	20.86	21.23	x	x	21.23	SB	10
3	Konrad Bukowiecki	Poland	20.83	20.18	20.80	20.33	20.83		9
4	Frédéric Dagée	France	19.45	19.88	20.04	x	20.04	PB	8
5	Aliaksei Nichypor	Belarus	19.49	19.77	19.22		19.77		7
6	Nikólaos Skarvélis	Greece	19.33	19.73	19.45		19.73	SB	6
7	Carlos Tobalina	Spain	19.06	19.57	19.45		19.57		5
8	Sebastiano Bianchetti	Italy	18.49	18.87	19.34		19.34		4
9	Ihor Musiyenko	Ukraine	18.78	19.33	x		19.33		3
10	Scott Lincoln	Great Britain	17.96	17.65	17.95		17.96		2
11	Erik Cadée	Netherlands	15.58	x	16.79		16.79		1

=== Discus throw ===
Rank	Name	Nationality	#1	#2	#3	#4	Mark	Notes	Points
1	Robert Harting	Germany	63.60	65.13	x	66.30	66.30	SB	11
2	Robert Urbanek	Poland	63.30	64.22	66.25	66.11	66.25	SB	10
3	Lolassonn Djouhan	France	60.96	60.16	61.37	64.35	64.35		9
4	Erik Cadée	Netherlands	59.81	62.22	x	60.60	62.22	SB	8
5	Zane Duquemin	Great Britain	60.00	61.20	61.23		61.23		7
6	Lois Maikel Martínez	Spain	58.21	57.22	60.86		60.86		6
7	Hannes Kirchler	Italy	59.84	59.23	x		59.84		5
8	Marek Bárta	Czech Republic	55.17	59.84	57.15		59.84		4
9	Viktar Trus	Belarus	52.57	58.35	56.47		58.35		3
10	Ivan Panasyuk	Ukraine	54.73	x	54.41		54.73		2
11	Iason Thanopoulos	Greece	54.40	54.40	x		54.40		1

=== Hammer throw ===
Rank	Name	Nationality	#1	#2	#3	#4	Mark	Notes	Points
1	Paweł Fajdek	Poland	x	x	78.29	x	78.29		11
2	Pavel Bareisha	Belarus	75.41	73.17	x	77.52	77.52		10
3	Nick Miller	Great Britain	76.65	x	x	x	76.65		9
4	Quentin Bigot	France	76.63	76.13	76.14	73.28	76.63		8
5	Serhiy Reheda	Ukraine	x	75.10	x		75.10		7
6	Marco Lingua	Italy	72.67	74.69	x		74.69		6
7	Alexander Ziegler	Germany	69.02	x	66.05		69.02		5
8	Mihail Anastasakis	Greece	65.36	x	67.68		67.68		4
9	Miguel Alberto Blanco	Spain	x	67.38	67.65		67.65		3
10	Sander Stock	Netherlands	52.86	56.55	54.46		56.55		2
	Miroslav Pavlícek	Czech Republic	x	x	x		NM		0

=== Javelin throw ===
Rank	Name	Nationality	#1	#2	#3	#4	Mark	Notes	Points
1	Jakub Vadlejch	Czech Republic	80.51	83.44	87.95	–	87.95	CR	11
2	Ioánnis Kiriazís	Greece	85.27	–	–	86.33	86.33		10
3	Thomas Röhler	Germany	80.57	84.01	84.22	x	84.22		9
4	Pavel Mialeshka	Belarus	71.82	x	79.51	80.41	80.41	SB	8
5	Hubert Chmielak	Poland	73.72	x	75.81		75.81		7
6	Yuriy Kushniruk	Ukraine	68.62	70.72	74.14		74.14	SB	6
7	Mauro Fraresso	Italy	66.67	69.88	73.67		73.67		5
8	Matti Mortimore	Great Britain	69.56	70.82	72.42		72.42		4
9	Thomas van Ophem	Netherlands	63.97	71.28	x		71.28		3
10	Jérémy Nicollin	France	68.28	70.17	64.45		70.17		2
11	Odei Jainaga	Spain	60.48	69.85	x		69.85		1

== Women ==
=== 100 metres ===
==== Qualification ====
Qualification: First 3 in each heat (Q) and the next 2 fastest (q) advance to the Final

Rank	Heat	Lane	Name	Nationality	React	Time	Notes	Points
1	2	4	Carolle Zahi	France	0.124	11.34	Q	
2	1	7	Gina Lückenkemper	Germany	0.241	11.40	Q	
3	2	7	Corinne Humphreys	Great Britain	0.179	11.53	Q	
4	1	3	Grigoría-Emmanouéla Keramidá	Greece	0.161	11.54	Q	
5	2	3	Naomi Sedney	Netherlands	0.276	11.61	Q	
6	1	5	Krystsina Tsimanouskaya	Belarus	0.161	11.62	Q	
7	2	2	Audrey Alloh	Italy	0.195	11.70	q	
8	2	6	Barbora Procházková	Czech Republic	0.165	11.76	q	
9	2	5	Cristina Lara	Spain	0.175	11.87		3
	1	4	Olesya Povh	Ukraine	0.038	DQ	R 162.6	0
	1	6	Ewa Swoboda	Poland	0.081	DQ	R 162.6	0

==== Final ====
Rank	Lane	Name	Nationality	React	Time	Notes	Points
1	5	Carole Zahi	France	0.133	11.19		11
2	3	Gina Lückenkemper	Germany	0.181	11.35		10
3	6	Corinne Humphreys	Great Britain	0.156	11.50		9
4	7	Naomi Sedney	Netherlands	0.146	11.51		8
5	8	Krystsina Tsimanouskaya	Belarus	0.183	11.56		7
6	4	Grigoría-Emmanouéla Keramidá	Greece	0.205	11.60		6
7	1	Barbora Procházková	Czech Republic	0.157	11.70		5
8	2	Audrey Alloh	Italy	0.126	11.72		4

=== 200 metres ===
==== Qualification ====
Qualification: First 3 in each heat (Q) and the next 2 fastest (q) advance to the Final

Rank	Heat	Lane	Name	Nationality	React	Time	Notes	Points
1	1	3	Estela García	Spain	0.230	23.13	Q, PB	
2	1	4	Rebekka Haase	Germany	0.182	23.19	Q	
3	1	5	Krystsina Tsimanouskaya	Belarus	0.227	23.19	Q, PB	
4	2	5	María Belibasáki	Greece	0.215	23.27	Q	
5	1	7	Finette Agyapong	Great Britain	0.163	23.31	q	
6	2	4	Anna Kiełbasińska	Poland	0.258	23.62	Q, SB	
7	2	2	Fanny Peltier	France	0.162	23.70	Q	
8	1	6	Alina Kalistratova	Ukraine	0.288	23.77	q	
9	2	6	Tessa van Schagen	Netherlands	0.214	23.77		3
10	2	7	Nikola Bendová	Czech Republic	0.255	23.99		2
11	2	3	Irene Siragusa	Italy	0.177	23.99		1

==== Final ====
Due to problems with the timing, all times were stopped by hand.

Rank	Lane	Name	Nationality	React	Time	Notes	Points
1	6	Maria Belibasaki	Greece		22.6		11
2	3	Anna Kiełbasińska	Poland		22.8		10
3	5	Rebekka Haase	Germany		22.8		9
4	1	Finette Agyapong	Great Britain		23.0		8
5	7	Krystsina Tsimanouskaya	Belarus		23.1		7
6	4	Estela García	Spain		23.1		6
7	2	Alina Kalistratova	Ukraine		23.4		5
8	8	Fanny Peltier	France		23.5		4

=== 400 metres ===
==== Qualification ====
Qualification: First 3 in each heat (Q) and the next 2 fastest (q) advance to the Final

Rank	Heat	Lane	Name	Nationality	React	Time	Notes	Points
1	1	7	Olha Zemlyak	Ukraine	0.191	51.70	Q	
2	1	3	Laura Müller	Germany	0.124	52.04	Q, SB	
3	2	2	Déborah Sananes	France	0.274	52.45	Q	
4	2	3	Irini Vasiliou	Greece	0.268	52.52	Q	
5	2	4	Iga Baumgart	Poland	0.251	52.61	Q	
6	2	7	Maria Benedicta Chigbolu	Italy	0.207	52.64	q	
7	1	4	Lisanne de Witte	Netherlands	0.315	52.67	Q	
8	2	5	Mary Iheke	Great Britain	0.263	52.92	q, SB	
9	1	5	Laura Bueno	Spain	0.237	53.15		3
10	2	6	Ilona Vusovich	Belarus	0.267	53.20	SB	2
11	1	6	Marcela Pírková	Czech Republic	0.222	53.60		1

==== Final ====
Rank	Lane	Name	Nationality	React	Time	Notes	Points
1	7	Lisanne de Witte	Netherlands	0.253	51.71	PB	11
2	5	Olha Zemlyak	Ukraine	0.241	51.88		10
3	3	Laura Müller	Germany	0.153	52.09		9
4	8	Iga Baumgart	Poland	0.264	52.18	SB	8
5	2	Maria Benedicta Chigbolu	Italy	0.141	52.36		7
6	1	Mary Iheke	Great Britain	0.204	52.60	PB	6
7	4	Irini Vasiliou	Greece	0.216	52.74		5
8	6	Déborah Sananes	France	0.237	53.01		4

=== 800 metres ===
Rank	Name	Nationality	Time	Notes	Points
1	Olha Lyakhova	Ukraine	2:03.09		11
2	Yusneysi Santiusti	Italy	2:03.56		10
3	Esther Guerrero	Spain	2:03.70		9
4	Joanna Jóźwik	Poland	2:03.81		8
5	Christina Hering	Germany	2:04.19		7
6	Konstadína Yiannopoúlou	Greece	2:04.60		6
7	Maryna Arzamasova	Belarus	2:04.86		5
8	Kateřina Hálová	Czech Republic	2:05.03		4
9	Katie Snowden	Great Britain	2:05.19		3
10	Clarisse Moh	France	2:05.82		2
11	Danaïd Prinsen	Netherlands	2:08.02		1

=== 1500 metres ===
Rank	Name	Nationality	Time	Notes	Points
1	Konstanze Klosterhalfen	Germany	4:09.57		11
2	Angelika Cichocka	Poland	4:12.16		10
3	Nataliya Pryshchepa	Ukraine	4:13.51	SB	9
4	Daryia Barysevich	Belarus	4:14.37		8
5	Marta Pérez	Spain	4:14.68		7
6	Maureen Koster	Netherlands	4:15.12		6
7	Kristiina Mäki	Czech Republic	4:16.43		5
8	Elodie Normand	France	4:17.53		4
9	Rhianwedd Price	Great Britain	4:17.60		3
10	Yusneysi Santiusti	Italy	4:19.59		2
11	Konstadina Yiannopoulou	Greece	4:31.58		1

=== 3000 metres ===
Rank	Name	Nationality	Time	Notes	Points
1	Sofia Ennaoui	Poland	9:01.24		11
2	Hanna Klein	Germany	9:01.64		10
3	Simona Vrzalová	Czech Republic	9:02.77	PB	9
4	Susan Krumins	Netherlands	9:03.16		8
5	Nuria Fernández	Spain	9:03.40		7
6	Margherita Magnani	Italy	9:03.75		6
7	Viktoriya Pohoryelska	Ukraine	9:06.02	SB	5
8	Tatsiana Stsefanenka	Belarus	9:07.08	PB	4
9	Harriet Knowles-Jones	Great Britain	9:14.86		3
10	Anastasía-Panayióta Marinákou	Greece	9:20.15		2
11	Ophélie Claude-Boxberger	France	9:34.10		1

=== 5000 metres ===
Rank	Name	Nationality	Time	Notes	Points
1	Ana Lozano	Spain	15:18.40		11
2	Yuliya Shmatenko	Ukraine	15:30.36	SB	10
3	Alina Reh	Germany	15:32.50		9
4	Liv Westphal	France	15:34.73	SB	8
5	Paulina Kaczyńska	Poland	16:01.68	SB	7
6	Calli Thackery	Great Britain	16:12.16		6
7	Nina Savina	Belarus	16:17.81		5
8	Moira Stewartová	Czech Republic	16:22.38		4
9	Anne Luijten	Netherlands	16:24.05		3
10	Isabel Mattuzzi	Italy	16:33.19		2
11	Ourania Rebouli	Greece	17:31.47		1

=== 3000 metres steeplechase ===
Rank	Name	Nationality	Time	Notes	Points
1	Gesa Felicitas Krause	Germany	9:27.02		11
2	Lennie Waite	Great Britain	9:43.33	SB	10
3	Irene Sánchez-Escribano	Spain	9:43.51		9
4	Francesca Bertoni	Italy	9:43.80	PB	8
5	Lucie Sekanová	Czech Republic	9:43.88	SB	7
6	Nataliya Strebkova	Ukraine	9:44.57	NU23R	6
7	Maeva Danois	France	9:47.50	SB	5
8	Nastassia Puzakova	Belarus	9:58.37		4
9	Matylda Kowal	Poland	10:01.98		3
10	Veerle Bakker	Netherlands	10:16.15		2
11	Maria Maniadaki	Greece	10:46.74		1

=== 100 metres hurdles ===
==== Qualification ====
Qualification: First 3 in each heat (Q) and the next 2 fastest (q) advance to the Final

Rank	Heat	Lane	Name	Nationality	React	Time	Notes	Points
1	1	6	Pamela Dutkiewicz	Germany	0.105	12.82	Q	
2	1	5	Elisávet Pesirídou	Greece	0.150	13.03	Q, SB	
3	1	3	Laura Valette	France	0.148	13.04	Q, PB	
4	1	7	Hanna Plotitsyna	Ukraine	0.165	13.05	q, SB	
5	2	4	Alina Talay	Belarus	0.179	13.11	Q	
6	2	2	Karolina Kołeczek	Poland	0.176	13.17	Q	
7	2	6	Alicia Barrett	Great Britain	0.193	13.32	Q	
8	2	5	Teresa Errandonea	Spain	0.180	13.37	q, PB	
9	1	4	Veronica Borsi	Italy	0.148	13.61		3
10	2	7	Lucie Koudelová	Czech Republic	0.166	13.70		2
	2	3	Sharona Bakker	Netherlands	0.182	DQ	R 168.7.b	0

==== Final ====
Rank	Lane	Name	Nationality	React	Time	Notes	Points
1	3	Pamela Dutkiewicz	Germany	0.102	12.75		11
2	6	Alina Talay	Belarus	0.117	12.91		10
3	2	Hanna Plotitsyna	Ukraine	0.146	13.05		9
4	4	Elisavet Pesiridou	Greece	0.122	13.12		8
5	7	Laura Valette	France	0.157	13.24		7
6	8	Alicia Barrett	Great Britain	0.145	13.27		6
	1	Teresa Errandonea	Spain	0.172	DQ	R 168.7b	4.5
	5	Karolina Kołeczek	Poland	0.092	DQ	R 162.7	4.5

=== 400 metres hurdles ===
==== Qualification ====
Qualification: First 3 in each heat (Q) and the next 2 fastest (q) advance to the Final

Rank	Heat	Lane	Name	Nationality	React	Time	Notes	Points
1	1	4	Eilidh Doyle	Great Britain	0.192	55.76	Q, SB	
2	2	5	Yadisleidy Pedroso	Italy	0.274	56.29	Q	
3	2	2	Olena Kolesnychenko	Ukraine	0.223	56.33	Q	
4	2	3	Denisa Rosolová	Czech Republic	0.231	56.33	Q, SB	
5	1	3	Joanna Linkiewicz	Poland	0.210	57.39	Q	
6	1	7	Jackie Baumann	Germany	0.286	57.52	Q	
7	2	6	Phara Anacharsis	France	0.256	57.63	q	
8	1	6	Katerina Dalaka	Greece	0.310	58.09	q	
9	1	5	Anna Sjoukje Runia	Netherlands	0.243	59.43		3
10	2	4	Katsiaryna Khairullina	Belarus	0.294	59.70		2
11	2	7	Sonia Nasarre	Spain	0.334	1:00.85		1

==== Final ====
Rank	Lane	Name	Nationality	React	Time	Notes	Points
1	6	Eilidh Doyle	Great Britain	0.144	54.60	SB	11
2	3	Yadisleidy Pedroso	Italy	0.174	55.39	SB	10
3	5	Olena Kolesnychenko	Ukraine	0.149	55.51		9
4	7	Denisa Rosolová	Czech Republic	0.169	55.59	SB	8
5	4	Joanna Linkiewicz	Poland	0.167	55.98		7
6	2	Phara Anacharsis	France	0.228	57.08		6
7	8	Jackie Baumann	Germany	0.228	57.98		5
8	1	Katerina Dalaka	Greece	0.167	58.21		4

=== 4 × 100 metres ===
Rank	Final	Lane	Nation	Athletes	React	Time	Notes	Points
1	A	6	Germany	Lara Matheis, Alexandra Burghardt, Gina Lückenkemper, Rebekka Haase	0.194	42.47	CR	11
2	A	4	Poland	Kamila Ciba, Marika Popowicz-Drapała, Anna Kiełbasińska, Ewa Swoboda	0.198	43.07		10
3	B	4	Ukraine	Olesya Povh, Hrystyna Stuy, Yana Kachur, Yelizaveta Bryzgina	0.191	43.09		9
4	B	5	Italy	Gloria Hooper, Irene Siragusa, Anna Bongiorni, Audrey Alloh	0.197	43.38		8
5	B	7	Netherlands	Jamile Samuel, Dafne Schippers, Tessa van Schagen, Naomi Sedney	0.126	43.56		7
6	A	3	Spain	Alazne Furundarena, Paula Sevilla, Estela García, Cristina Lara	0.185	44.03		6
7	A	2	Czech Republic	Klára Seidlová, Barbora Procházková, Jana Slaninová, Marcela Pírková	0.133	44.10		5
8	B	6	Greece	Grigoria-Emmanouela Keramida, Elisavet Pesiridou, Ekaterini Dalaka, Maria Belibasaki	0.204	44.20		4
9	B	3	Belarus	Alina Talay, Krystsina Radzivaniuk, Katsiaryna Kharashkevich, Elvira Herman	0.145	45.06		3
	A	5	Great Britain	Asha Philip, Desirèe Henry, Shannon Hylton, Daryll Neita	0.125	DNF		0
	A	7	France	Floriane Gnafoua, Stella Akakpo, Charlotte Jeanne, Carole Zahi	0.158	DQ	R 170.7	0

=== 4 × 400 metres ===
Rank	Final	Lane	Nation	Athletes	React	Time	Notes	Points
1	A	3	Poland	Iga Baumgart, Patrycja Wyciszkiewicz, Martyna Dąbrowska, Małgorzata Hołub	0.286	3:27.60	EL	11
2	A	2	Ukraine	Kateryna Klymyuk, Olha Lyakhova, Anastasiya Bryzhina, Olha Zemlyak	0.260	3:28.02		10
3	A	4	Germany	Laura Müller, Nadine Gonska, Hannah Mergenthaler, Ruth Sophia Spelmeyer	0.154	3:28.47		9
4	A	5	Great Britain	Emily Diamond, Laviai Nielsen, Kirsten McAslan, Anyika Onuora	0.132	3:28.96		8
5	A	7	France	Déborah Sananes, Elea-Mariama Diarra, Louise-Anne Bertheau, Agnès Raharolahy	0.279	3:29.09		7
6	A	6	Italy	Raphaela Boaheng Lukudo, Marzia Caravelli, Gloria Hooper, Maria Enrica Spacca	0.168	3:29.84		6
7	B	3	Netherlands	Anna Sjoukje Runia, Lisanne de Witte, Laura de Witte, Eva Hovenkamp	0.234	3:31.79		5
8	B	5	Greece	Despina Mourta, Anna Vasiliou, Andriana Ferra, Irini Vasiliou	0.186	3:32.80		4
9	B	6	Spain	Carmen Sánchez, Laura Bueno, Aauri Lorena Bokesa, Elena Moreno	0.176	3:33.70		3
10	B	4	Czech Republic	Helena Jiranová, Katerina Hálová, Marcela Pírková, Tereza Petržilková	0.208	3:35.41		2
11	B	7	Belarus	Yuliya Kastsiuchkova, Viktoria Kushnir, Maryna Arzamasova, Ilona Usovich	0.237	3:38.28		1

=== High jump ===
Rank	Name	Nationality	1.65	1.70	1.75	1.80	1.85	1.90	1.94	1.97	2.00	Mark	Notes	Points
1	Kamila Lićwinko	Poland	–	–	–	–	o	xo	o	o	xxx	1.97	=SB	11
2	Marie-Laurence Jungfleisch	Germany	–	–	–	o	o	o	xo	xxo	x	1.97	SB	10
3	Michaela Hrubá	Czech Republic	–	–	o	o	o	xo	xo	xx		1.94	NU20R	8.5
3	Alessia Trost	Italy	–	–	–	o	xo	o	xo	xx		1.94	SB	8.5
5	Tatiana Gusin	Greece	–	–	–	o	o	o	xxx			1.90		7
6	Oksana Okuneva	Ukraine	–	–	o	o	xo	xo	xx			1.90		6
7	Morgan Lake	Great Britain	–	–	–	o	o	xxx				1.85		4.5
7	Karina Taranda	Belarus	–	o	o	o	o	xxx				1.85		4.5
9	Saleta Fernández	Spain	o	o	o	o	xxx					1.80		2.5
9	Lisanne Hagens	Netherlands	–	o	o	o	xxx					1.80		2.5
11	Marine Vallet	France	–	o	o	xo	xxx					1.80		1

=== Pole vault ===
Rank	Name	Nationality	3.80	4.00	4.20	4.35	4.45	4.55	4.60	4.65	4.70	4.82	Mark	Notes	Points
1	Katerina Stefanidi	Greece	–	–	–	–	–	–	xo	–	o	xxx	4.70		11
2	Iryna Yakaltsevich	Belarus	–	–	o	xo	xo	xo	o	x			4.60	PB	10
3	Ninon Guillon-Romarin	France	–	–	o	o	xo	xxx					4.45		9
4	Romana Malácová	Czech Republic	–	–	o	o	xx–	x					4.35		8
5	Femke Pluim	Netherlands	–	–	xo	o	xxx						4.35	SB	7
6	Sally Peake	Great Britain	–	o	o	xxo	xx						4.35	=SB	6
7	Yana Hladiychuk	Ukraine	o	xo	o	xxx							4.20		5
8	Kamila Przybyła	Poland	–	o	xo	xxx							4.20		4
9	Miren Bartolome	Spain	o	o	xxo	xx							4.20		3
10	Sonia Malavisi	Italy	–	xo	xxx								4.00		2
-	Lisa Ryzih	Germany											DNS		0

=== Long jump ===
Rank	Name	Nationality	#1	#2	#3	#4	Mark	Notes	Points
1	Claudia Salman-Rath	Germany	6.66	x	6.44	6.52	6.66		11
2	Rougui Sow	France	6.09	5.89	6.45	6.39	6.45		10
3	Maryna Bekh	Ukraine	6.27	x	6.43	x	6.43		9
4	Jazmin Sawyers	Great Britain	6.29	6.36	6.42	6.24	6.42		8
5	Anna Jagaciak-Michalska	Poland	6.35	6.23	6.28		6.35		7
6	Laura Strati	Italy	6.35	6.13	6.24		6.35		6
7	Juliet Itoya	Spain	x	6.32	x		6.32		5
8	Violetta Skvartsova	Belarus	6.02	5.82	6.13		6.13		4
9	Barbora Dvořáková	Czech Republic	5.97	6.01	5.95		6.01		3
10	Haido Alexouli	Greece	x	5.94	x		5.94		2
11	Tara Yoro	Netherlands	5.40	–	–		5.40		1

=== Triple jump ===
Rank	Name	Nationality	#1	#2	#3	#4	Mark	Notes	Points
1	Paraskeví Papahrístou	Greece	13.71	14.24	13.94	14.22	14.24	SB	11
2	Kristin Gierisch	Germany	13.64	13.63	14.13	14.11	14.13		10
3	Jeanine Assani Issouf	France	x	13.59	14.00	x	14.00		9
4	Lucie Májková	Czech Republic	13.73	13.54	13.45	13.49	13.73	SB	8
5	Anna Jagaciak-Michalska	Poland	11.70	13.71	x		13.71		7
6	Olha Saladuha	Ukraine	13.62	13.52	13.41		13.62		6
7	Iryna Vaskouskaya	Belarus	13.50	13.24	13.58		13.58		5
8	Ana Peleteiro	Spain	13.06	13.54	x		13.54		4
9	Shara Proctor	Great Britain	13.39	13.13	13.32		13.39		3
10	Dariya Derkach	Italy	12.84	13.29	13.37		13.37		2
11	Maureen Herremans	Netherlands	11.93	11.88	11.33		11.93		1

=== Shot put ===
Rank	Name	Nationality	#1	#2	#3	#4	Mark	Notes	Points
1	Aliona Dubitskaya	Belarus	17.39	17.98	18.39	x	18.39		11
2	Melissa Boekelman	Netherlands	17.72	x	17.67	17.68	17.72		10
3	Paulina Guba	Poland	17.67	x	17.16	x	17.67		9
4	Sara Gambetta	Germany	17.14	x	16.34	17.49	17.49		8
5	Jessica Cérival	France	16.37	16.86	x		16.86		7
6	Úrsula Ruiz	Spain	15.81	16.68	x		16.68		6
7	Chiara Rosa	Italy	16.42	16.38	16.63		16.63		5
8	Halyna Obleshchuk	Ukraine	16.48	16.09	16.56		16.56		4
9	Stamatia Skarvelis	Greece	15.98	15.84	16.42		16.42		3
10	Amelia Strickler	Great Britain	15.40	15.35	15.17		15.40		2
11	Petra Klementová	Czech Republic	12.82	14.44	15.31		15.31		1

=== Discus throw ===
Rank	Name	Nationality	#1	#2	#3	#4	Mark	Notes	Points
1	Mélina Robert-Michon	France	61.56	60.49	62.62	x	62.62		11
2	Nadine Müller	Germany	60.33	62.57	x	x	62.57		10
3	Hrisoula Anagnostopoulou	Greece	59.28	54.91	58.46	57.91	59.28		9
4	Natalia Semenova	Ukraine	56.93	x	58.93	x	58.93		8
5	Eliška Staňková	Czech Republic	58.44	x	x		58.44		7
6	Daisy Osakue	Italy	x	57.64	x		57.64	NUR, PB	6
7	Lidia Augustyniak	Poland	56.16	56.59	56.09		56.59		5
8	Sabina Asenjo	Spain	56.42	55.91	55.66		56.42		4
9	Corinne Nugter	Netherlands	54.53	51.40	56.39		56.39		3
10	Jade Lally	Great Britain	49.07	x	54.01		54.01		2
11	Sviatlana Siarova	Belarus	49.78	50.58	50.98		50.98		1

=== Hammer throw ===
Rank	Name	Nationality	#1	#2	#3	#4	Mark	Notes	Points
1	Hanna Malyshchyk	Belarus	x	74.56	74.29	x	74.56		11
2	Malwina Kopron	Poland	67.09	73.06	71.88	x	73.06		10
3	Alyona Shamotina	Ukraine	62.71	70.02	67.74	x	70.02	PB	9
4	Alexandra Tavernier	France	69.40	64.25	66.96	x	69.40		8
5	Sophie Hitchon	Great Britain	x	69.10	69.30		69.30		7
6	Berta Castells	Spain	61.69	64.53	67.44		67.44	SB	6
7	Kateřina Šafránková	Czech Republic	x	65.85	65.47		65.85		5
8	Kathrin Klaas	Germany	57.48	64.43	x		64.43		4
9	Sara Fantini	Italy	63.19	60.17	x		63.19		3
10	Iliána Korosídou	Greece	61.07	62.63	61.59		62.63		2
11	Wendy Koolhaas	Netherlands	59.05	60.54	x		60.54		1

=== Javelin throw ===
Rank	Name	Nationality	#1	#2	#3	#4	Mark	Notes	Points
1	Barbora Špotáková	Czech Republic	62.17	63.81	x	65.14	65.14	SB	11
2	Tatsiana Khaladovich	Belarus	64.60	62.67	x	60.90	64.60		10
3	Marcelina Witek	Poland	60.98	x	55.05	x	60.98	SB	9
4	Katharina Molitor	Germany	57.56	60.71	59.46	x	60.71		8
5	Sofia Ifantidou	Greece	54.24	53.79	58.21		58.21		7
6	Hanna Hatsko-Fedusova	Ukraine	56.02	56.01	55.23		56.02		6
7	Paola Padovan	Italy	52.68	55.45	x		55.45		5
8	Lidia Parada	Spain	51.05	x	x		51.05		4
9	Jo Blair	Great Britain	50.61	x	x		50.61		3
10	Alexia Kogut Kubiak	France	45.89	50.11	x		50.11		2
11	Lisanne Schol	Netherlands	49.94	x	x		49.94		1
