= Buse Arıkazan =

Turkish pole vaulter (born 1994)

Personal information
- Nationality: TUR
- Born: Buse Arıkazan; 8 July 1994 (age 32) Altındağ, Ankara, Turkey

Sport
- Sport: Athletics
- Event: Pole vault
- Club: Enka S.K.

Achievements and titles
- Personal bests: 2017: 4.32 NR; 2018: 4.30 m NR; 2019: 4.40 m NR, 4.36 m indoor NR
Medal record
Women's athletics
Representing Turkey
Islamic Solidarity Games
Gold medal – first place	2013 Palembang	Pole vault
Gold medal – first place	2017 Baku	Pole vault
Gold medal – first place	2021 Konya	Pole vault
Silver medal – second place	2025 Riyadh	Pole vault
Balkan Championships
Gold medal – first place	2019 Pravets	Pole vault
Gold medal – first place	2018 Stara Zagora	Pole vault
Silver medal – second place	2017 Novi Pazar	Pole vault
Bronze medal – third place	2013 Stara Zagora	Pole vault
Balkan Indoor Championships
Silver medal – second place	2020 Istanbul	Pole vault
Silver medal – second place	2019 Istanbul	Pole vault
Bronze medal – third place	2018 Istanbul	Pole vault
Bronze medal – third place	2015 Istanbul	Pole vault
Silver medal – second place	2012 Istanbul	Pole vault

Buse Arıkazan Çağlayan (née Buse Arıkazan; 8 July 1994), also known as Buse Çağlayan, is a Turkish pole vaulter. She is a member of Enka SK in Istanbul. She holds national records both outdoor and indoor. She studied Exercise and Sport Science at Hacettepe University in Ankara.

== Early life ==
Buse Arıkan was born in Altındağ district of Ankara Province, Turkey. She started running sport in the elementary school upon recommendation of her teacher. She drew attention with her success in intraschool competitions. She later unwillingly switched over to pole vault upon the recommendation of the national athletics coach Tayfun Aygün.

== Sports career ==
Arıkazan was the national record holder for juniors with 3.75 m before it was broken by Demet Parlak in 2013. She captured the gold medal at the 2013 Islamic Solidarity Games held in Palembang, Indonesia. She took the bronze medal at the 2015 Balkan Indoor Championships in Istanbul. During the 2017 Istanbul Cup, she broke the national record first with 4.27 m and then with 4.32 m, which was held by Demet Parlakwith 4.26 m. Arıkazan shared the gold medal with Demet Parlak at the 2017 Islamic Solidarity Games held in Baku, Azerbaijan. She set the Games record with 4.15 m. She took part at the 2019 Summer Universiade in Naples, Italy. She reached 4.30 m and placed sixth rank. 2018 Balkan Athletics Championships held in Stara Zagora, Bulgaria, she added one gold medal to her previous two silver and one bronze medals won at the Balkan Athletics Championships. She became bronze medalist at the 2018 Balkan Athletics Indoor Championships in Istanbul. At the Cezmi Or Memorial Tournament in 2018, she equaled the national record held by Demet Parlak with 4.30. She won the silver medal at the 2019 Balkan Indoor Championships in Istanbul. During the Istanbul Olympic Indoor Athletics Qualifications in 2019, she set a new national indoor record with 4.36 m, which belonged to Demet Parlak with 4.33 m. Arıkazan became champion at the 2019 Balkan Championships in Pravets, Bulgaria. She improved her own national record to 4.40 m at the first round of the 2019 Türkcell Athletics Super League in Bursa. She became silver medalist at the 2020 Balkan Athletics Indoor Championships in Istanbul, Turkey.

== International competitions ==
Year	Competition	Venue	Position	Result	Notes
Representing Turkey
2012	Balkan Indoor Championships	Istanbul, Turkey	2nd	4.00 m PB	
2013	Balkan Championships	Stara Zagora, Bulgaria	3rd	3.80 m	
2013	Islamic Solidarity Games	Palembang, Indonesia	1st	3.95 m	
2015	Balkan Indoor Championships	Istanbul, Turkey	3rd	4.00 m	
2017	Islamic Solidarity Games	Baku, Azerbaijan	1st	4.15 m GR	
2017	Balkan Championships	Novi Pazar, Serbia	2nd	3.80 m	
2018	Balkan Championships	Stara Zagora, Bulgaria	1st	4.00 m	
2018	Balkan Indoor Championships	Istanbul, Turkey	3rd	4.10 m	
2019	Balkan Indoor Championships	Istanbul, Turkey	2nd	4.30 m	
2019	Balkan Championships	Pravets, Bulgaria	1st	4.35 m	
2020	Balkan Indoor Championships	Istanbul, Turkey	2nd	4.20 m	
2025	Islamic Solidarity Games	Riyadh, Saudi Arabia	2nd	4.01 m	
