= Katerina Dalaka =

Greek hurdler

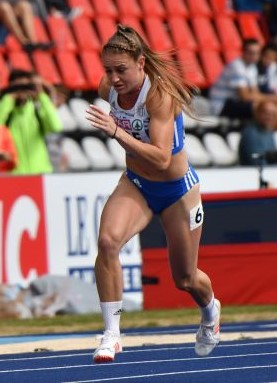

Personal information
- Nationality: Greek
- Born: Katerina Dalaka; 20 August 1992 (age 33) Munich, Germany

Sport
- Country: Greece
- Sport: Athletics
- Event(s): 400 m hurdles, 400 m 200 m, 100 m 200 m (i), 60 m
- Club: A.E.K.

Achievements and titles
- Personal best(s): 57.97 (2017), 55.45 (2015); 23.74 (2021), 11.52 (2016); 24.19 (2017), 7.45 (2017)
Medal record
Women's Athletics
Representing Greece
Balkan Athletics Championships
Gold medal – first place	2016 Pitești	200 m
Gold medal – first place	2016 Pitești	400 m hurdles
Gold medal – first place	2016 Pitești	4x100 m relay
Gold medal – first place	2017 Novi Pazar	100 m
Silver medal – second place	2016 Pitești	4x400 m relay
Silver medal – second place	2017 Novi Pazar	400 m hurdles

Katerina Dalaka (Greek: Κατερίνα Δαλάκα, born August 20, 1992, in Munich, Germany) is a Greek hurdler. With origins from Katerini, currently representing A.E.K., Dalaka has won gold medals at the Panhellenic Games and the Balkan Games in 400 m hurdles as well as in 100 m, 200 m, the 100 m relay and the 400 m relay.

== International competitions ==
Year	Competition	Venue	Position	Event	Notes
2016	European Championships	Amsterdam, Netherlands	14th (sf)	4 × 100 m relay	44.58
2016	European Championships	Amsterdam, Netherlands	10th (sf)	4 × 400 m relay	3:31.66 SB
2017	European Team Championships	Lille, France	8th	400 m hurdles	58.21
2017	European Team Championships	Lille, France	8th	4 × 100 m relay	44.20

== Greek Championships ==
2014 Panhellenic Games
400 m hurdles: 59.61 s - 1st

2015 Panhellenic Games
400 m hurdles: 59.34 s - 2nd

2016 Panhellenic Games
200 m indoor: 24.83 s - 3rd
100 m: 11.70 s - 1st
400 m hurdles: 58.43 s - 1st

2017 Panhellenic Games
60 m indoor: 7.50 s - 5th
200 m indoor: 24.57 s - 2nd
100 m: 11.57 s - 3rd
400 m hurdles: 59.47 s - 1st

2019 Panhellenic Games
4 × 400 m relay indoor: 3:46.69 - 1st
100 m: 12.17 s - 8th
4 × 400 m relay: 3:42.06 - 1st

2021 Panhellenic Games
100 m: 11.59 s - 2nd
200 m: 23.74 s (PB) - 2nd

=== Personal ===
Her family has hails from Praitori, Larissa.

=== Survivor Greece ===
Katerina Dalaka participated in the 6th season of Survivor Greece and finished in the second place behind Ilias Gotsis. Her athleticism and character made her very popular to the public. She returned the next season where she was declared winner of season 2019. At 2023 she returned once again at season 10 at the All Star season of the show. On episode 15, Dalaka along with Asimina Chatziandreou were expelled after being accused for using a cell phone, ordering food. The next year they both joined the new season of the show which premiered on January 7, 2024. At the finals on June 26th, actor Daniel Nurka was the winner, Katerina along with Fanis Boletsis were the runners up. After her elimination she announced that she's retiring from the show.
