= Athletics at the 2025 Summer World University Games – Men's hammer throw =

Men's hammer throw at the 2025 Summer World University Games
- Venue: Lohrheidestadion
- Location: Bochum, Germany
- Dates: 22 July (qualification); 23 July (final)
- Competitors: 21 from 17 nations
- Winning distance: 77.10 m

Medalists
gold medal	Mykhaylo Kokhan	Ukraine
silver medal	Merlin Hummel	Germany
bronze medal	Giorgio Olivieri	Italy

The men's hammer throw event at the 2025 Summer World University Games was held in Bochum, Germany, at Lohrheidestadion on 22 and 23 July.

== Records ==
Prior to the competition, the records were as follows:

Record	Athlete (nation)	Distance (m)	Location	Date
Games record	Ivan Tikhon (BLR)	82.77 m	Daegu, South Korea	30 August 2003

== Results ==
=== Qualification ===
All athletes over 71.00 m (Q) or at least the 12 best performers (q) advance to the final.

==== Group A ====
Place	Athlete	Nation	#1	#2	#3	Result	Notes
1	Mykhaylo Kokhan	Ukraine	73.74			73.74 m	Q
2	Halil Yilmazer	Turkey	72.60			72.60 m	Q
3	Iosif Kesidis	Cyprus	69.49	71.09		71.09 m	Q
4	Jean-Baptiste Bruxelle	France	69.98	x	x	69.98 m	q
5	Adam Ziółkowski	Poland	62.90	66.93	x	66.93 m	q
6	Lars Wolfisberg	Switzerland	66.04	x	65.89	66.04 m	q
7	Roland Imre	Hungary	64.81	x	63.38	64.81 m	q
8	Hugo Sörby	Sweden	62.47	x	x	62.47 m	q
9	Shaun Kerry	Great Britain	61.99	57.73	60.59	61.99 m	
10	Andres Ayazo Muñoz	Colombia	49.33	x	x	49.33 m	
11	Rodrigo Yunga Mora	Ecuador	x	40.08	43.62	43.62 m	PB

==== Group B ====
Place	Athlete	Nation	#1	#2	#3	Result	Notes
1	Merlin Hummel	Germany	68.22	x	75.76	75.76 m	Q
2	Giorgio Olivieri	Italy	71.60			71.60 m	Q
3	Dawid Piłat	Poland	x	70.47	70.10	70.47 m	q
4	Alar Reiljan	Estonia	59.17	60.92	65.17	65.17 m	q
5	Basel Mohamed Ahmed	Egypt	61.30	x	61.37	61.37 m	
6	Dominic Nutter	United States	59.29	x	x	59.29 m	
7	Harry Ricketts	Great Britain	57.96	x	55.65	57.96 m	
—	Emre ÇiftçI	Turkey	x	x	x	NM	
—	Alfons Haals	Sweden	x	x	x	NM	
—	Gurdev Singh	India	x	x	x	NM	

=== Final ===
Place	Athlete	Nation	#1	#2	#3	#4	#5	#6	Result	Notes
1st place, gold medalist(s)	Mykhaylo Kokhan	Ukraine	73.60	74.35	75.53	77.10	x	x	77.10 m	
2nd place, silver medalist(s)	Merlin Hummel	Germany	75.88	77.03	74.93	x	x	x	77.03 m	
3rd place, bronze medalist(s)	Giorgio Olivieri	Italy	71.97	70.93	72.52	73.78	72.01	x	73.78 m	SB
4	Dawid Piłat	Poland	x	71.28	71.07	72.06	x	70.03	72.06 m	
5	Halil Yilmazer	Turkey	71.49	x	70.88	71.43	71.29	71.31	71.49 m	
6	Jean-Baptiste Bruxelle	France	70.44	68.68	70.34	71.37	68.93	70.72	71.37 m	
7	Iosif Kesidis	Cyprus	69.21	69.52	x	70.78	68.74	70.45	70.78 m	
8	Lars Wolfisberg	Switzerland	63.71	67.27	x	x	67.15	66.49	67.27 m	
9	Roland Imre	Hungary	65.16	65.96	66.00				66.00 m	
10	Adam Ziółkowski	Poland	64.37	65.16	65.62				65.62 m	
11	Hugo Sörby	Sweden	x	64.32	63.75				64.32 m	
12	Alar Reiljan	Estonia	62.00	63.56	x				63.56 m	
