= Christos Frantzeskakis =

Greek hammer thrower (born 2000)

Personal information
- Born: 26 April 2000 (age 26)

Sport
- Country: Greece
- Sport: Athletics
- Event: Hammer throw

Achievements and titles
- World finals: 9th
- National finals: 1st
- Personal best: 78.20m (2022)
Medal record
Representing Greece
Mediterranean Games
Silver medal – second place	2026 Taranto	Hammer throw
Balkan Athletics Championships
Gold medal – first place	2019 Pravets	Hammer throw

Christos Frantzeskakis (Greek: Χρήστος Φραντζεσκάκης; born 26 April 2000 in Chania) is a Greek athletics competitor competing in the hammer throw. He competed in the men's hammer throw event at the 2020 Summer Olympics held in Tokyo, Japan.

== Career ==
In 2019, he won the gold medal in the men's hammer throw event at the Balkan Athletics Championships held in Pravets, Bulgaria. In that same year, he competed in the men's hammer throw at the 2019 World Athletics Championships held in Doha, Qatar. He did not qualify to compete in the final.

He took the ninth place in the men's hammer throw event at the 2022 World Athletics Championships held in Eugene, Oregon, United States.

== International competitions ==
Year	Competition	Venue	Position	Notes
Representing Greece
2018	World U20 Championships	Tampere, Finland	-	NM
2019	European U20 Championships	Borås, Sweden	2nd	84.22 NU20R
2019	Balkan Championships	Pravets, Bulgaria	1st	76.67
2019	World Championships	Doha, Qatar	23rd (q)	72.96
2021	Olympic Games	Tokyo, Japan	25th (q)	72.19
2021	European Team Championships	Cluj-Napoca, Romania	2nd	73.46
2021	Balkan Championships	Smederevo, Serbia	2nd	72.74
2021	European U23 Championships	Tallinn, Estonia	2nd	75.23
2022	World Championships	Eugene, United States	9th	77.04
2022	European Championships	Munich, Germany	6th	78.20
2023	World Championships	Budapest, Hungary	14th (q)	74.05
2024	European Championships	Rome, Italy	18th (q)	73.11
2024	Olympic Games	Paris, France	12th	73.34
2025	World Championships	Tokyo, Japan	15th (q)	75.43
2026	European Championships	Birmingham, United Kingdom	10th	75.72
2026	Mediterranean Games	Taranto, Italy	2nd	77.59 m
