= Abedin Mujezinović =

Bosnian middle-distance runner

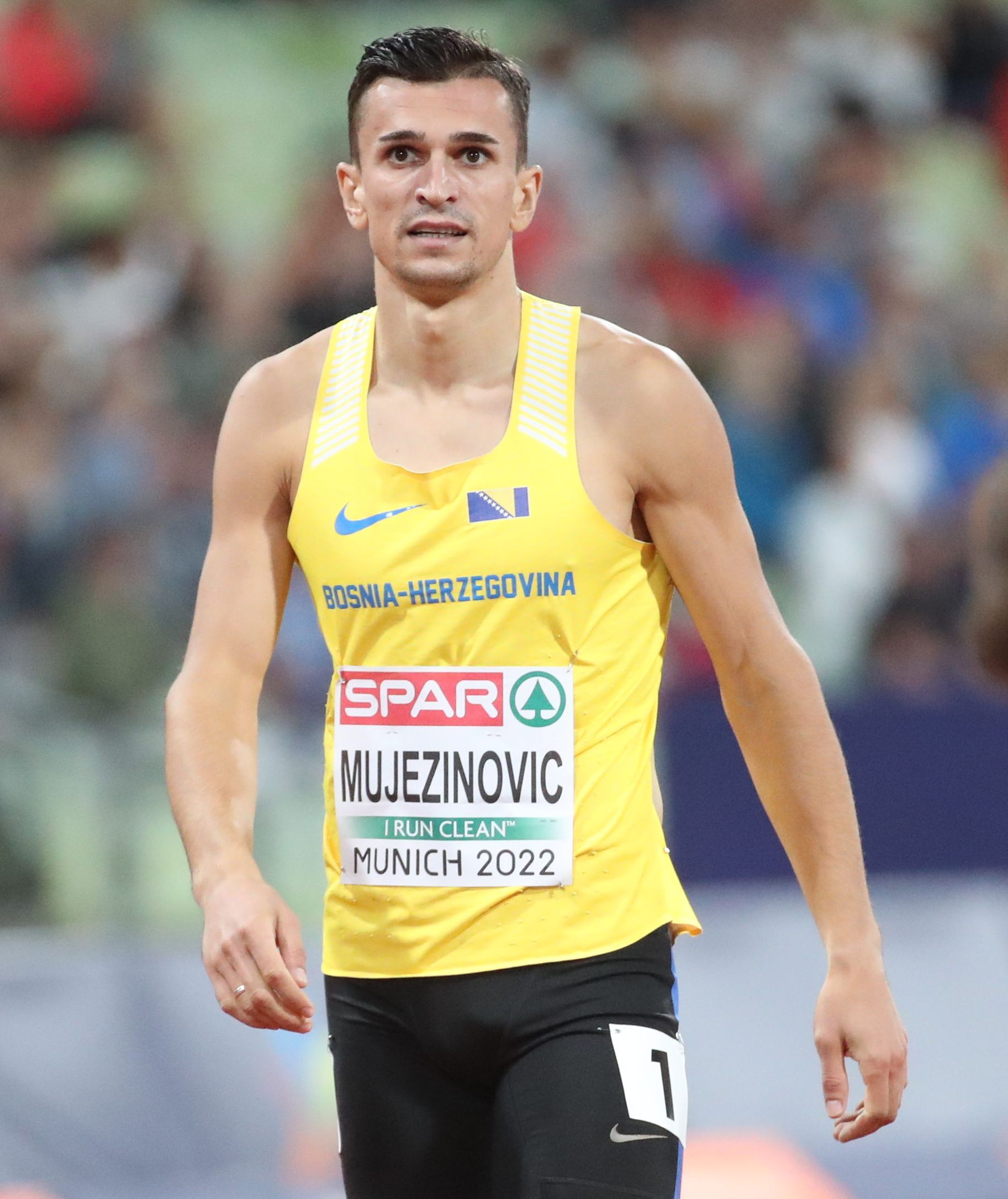
- Mujezinović at Munich 2022

Personal information
- Born: 2 June 1993 (age 33) Zenica, Republic of Bosnia and Herzegovina

Sport
- Country: Bosnia and Herzegovina
- Sport: Track and field
- Event: 800 metres
- Club: AK Sarajevo
- Coached by: Gianni Ghidini

Achievements and titles
- Highest world ranking: 55
- Personal best(s): 400 m: 47.58 (2019); 800 m: 1:45.32 (2023)
Medal record
Men's athletics
Representing Bosnia and Herzegovina
Mediterranean Games
Bronze medal – third place	2018 Tarragona	800 m
Balkan Championships
Gold medal – first place	2017 Novi Pazar	800 m
Bronze medal – third place	2016 Pitești	800 m
Bronze medal – third place	2016 Pitești	4x400 m relay
Bronze medal – third place	2020 Cluj-Napoca	800 m
Balkan Indoor Championships
Gold medal – first place	2017 Belgrade	800 m
Gold medal – first place	2022 Istanbul	800 m
Bronze medal – third place	2018 Istanbul	4x400 m relay
Bronze medal – third place	2021 Istanbul	800 m
- Updated on 19 August 2023

Abedin Mujezinović (born 2 June 1993) is a Bosnian middle-distance runner who competes in the 800 metres.

He won a bronze medal at the 2018 Mediterranean Games. He competed at the 2022 World Athletics Championships and the 2023 World Athletics Championships.

His personal best in the 800 m is 1:45.32, achieved in Lignano Sabbiadoro, Italy on 14 July 2023. He is coached by Gianni Ghidini.
