= Atanas Petrov =

Romanian volleyball coach (born 1977)

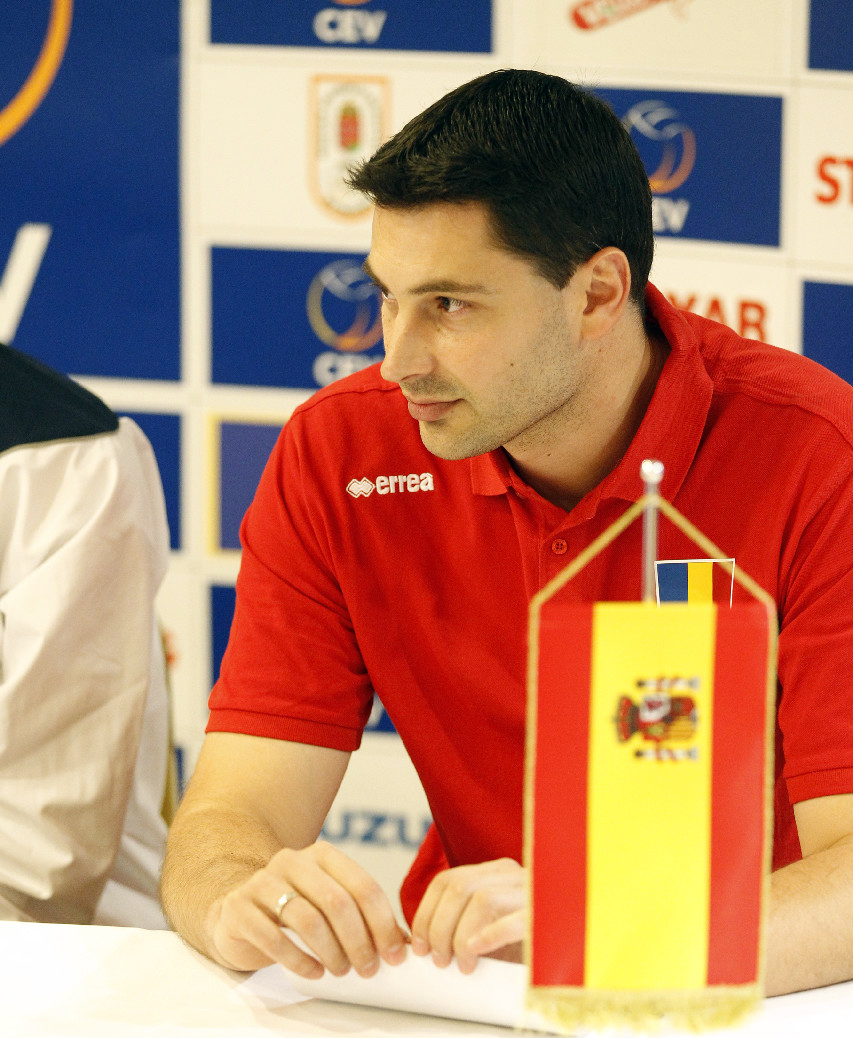
- Petrov managing Romanian women's national volleyball team in 2012

Personal information
- Nationality: Bulgarian
- Born: February 8, 1977 (age 49); Sofia, Bulgaria

Coaching information
- Current team: CSU Târgu Mureș (Head coach)
Previous teams coached
Years	Teams
2001–2010; 2003–2010; 2010–2011; 2011–2012; 2012–2013; 2012–2014; 2014–2015; 2015–	CSKA Sofia; Bulgaria; Dinamo Romprest; CSM Bucharest; Romania; Târgu Mureș; Pannaxiakos; Târgu Mureș
- Last updated: April 24, 2015

Atanas Petrov (Bulgarian: Атанас Петров) (born February 8, 1977) is a professional volleyball coach, who guided the professional volleyball women's team CSKA Sofia to many successes in the period 2003–2010 ( 5 titles, 3 national cups and many tournaments). At the same time he was coach of Junior's national team of Bulgaria for 7 years. He was the basis of the growth of the best volleyball generation of Bulgaria in recent 15 years. In the period 2010–2014 he was coach of the best teams in Romania (Dinamo Romprest, CSM Bucharest, CSU Târgu Mureș) and coach of Romanian woman's national team.

== Career ==
Petrov coached from 2001 until 2003 the CSKA Junior women's team. With this team he won 3 titles in Bulgarian junior's championships. In 2003, Petrov was promoted to coach of CSKA Sofia women's team. Follow 5 titles in Bulgarian championships, 3 national cups and first positions in many tournaments. For this success, he was awarded the title "Coach of the Year" for 2005 from National Sport Association. In season 2009–2010 Petrov and CSKA win title on championship of Bulgaria without losing any game and with only one game 3–2 on the final with Marica Plovdiv. Between 2003 and 2010, he served as the vice coach and later as the head coach of the Bulgarian junior's national volleyball team. From 2010 to 2011 Petrov is a head coach of Romanian Grand Dinamo Bucharest that win bronze in Romanian championship. In the season 2011–2012 he is a head coach of CSM Bucharest. From last position in championship 2010/2011, Petrov promoted the team to the top 4 on season 2011/2012. From 2012 to 2013 he is appointed for head coach of Romanian women's national team. From 2012 to 2014 Atanas Petrov is a coach of CSU Târgu Mureș. In 2014 the team qlasificate in top 4 in Romanian championship for first time in his history. In the season 2014/2015 is coach of Greek team AON Pannaxiakos, Naxos. In the same season Petrov and Pannaxiakos created the biggest achievement for the Greek team – won bronze medals, promoted team for final 4 in Greek cup and qualified for 4th Finals of the CEV Challenge cup. From 2014 Petrov is a head coach of Man's national team of Bulgaria U21.

== Education ==
Petrov has Bachelor's and master's degrees in volleyball coaching and physical education from the National Sports Academy "Vasil Levski" – Sofia; He have also second bachelor's degree for PR, Management and Journalism from the Sofia University;

== Honours ==
- 1 "Coach of the Year" of National Sport Association: 2005
- 5 times Champion of Bulgaria with CSKA volleyball women's team: 2004, 2005, 2007, 2008, 2010
- 3 times Winner of Bulgarian National Cup with CSKA volleyball women's team: 2004, 2008, 2010
- 3 times Champion of Bulgaria with CSKA junior women's team: 2001, 2002, 2003
- 1 Bronze of Romania with CS Dinamo București Romprest volleyball team: 2011
- 1 Silver of Balkan Games with Bulgarian volleyball national team: 2008
- 1 Silver of Black Sea Games with Bulgarian volleyball national team: 2007
- 1 Bronze of Greece with Pannaxiakos AON volleyball team: 2015
