= Antonio Zelić =

Croatian bobsledder

Personal information
- Nationality: Croatian
- Born: 5 June 1994 (age 30)
- Height: 1.91 m (6 ft 3 in)
- Weight: 86 kg (190 lb)

Sport
- Sport: Bobsleigh

Antonio Zelić (Croatian pronunciation: [zěːlitɕ]; born 5 June 1994) is a Croatian bobsledder. He competed in the 2018 Winter Olympics.
