= Giorgio Olivieri =

Italian hammer thrower (born 2000)

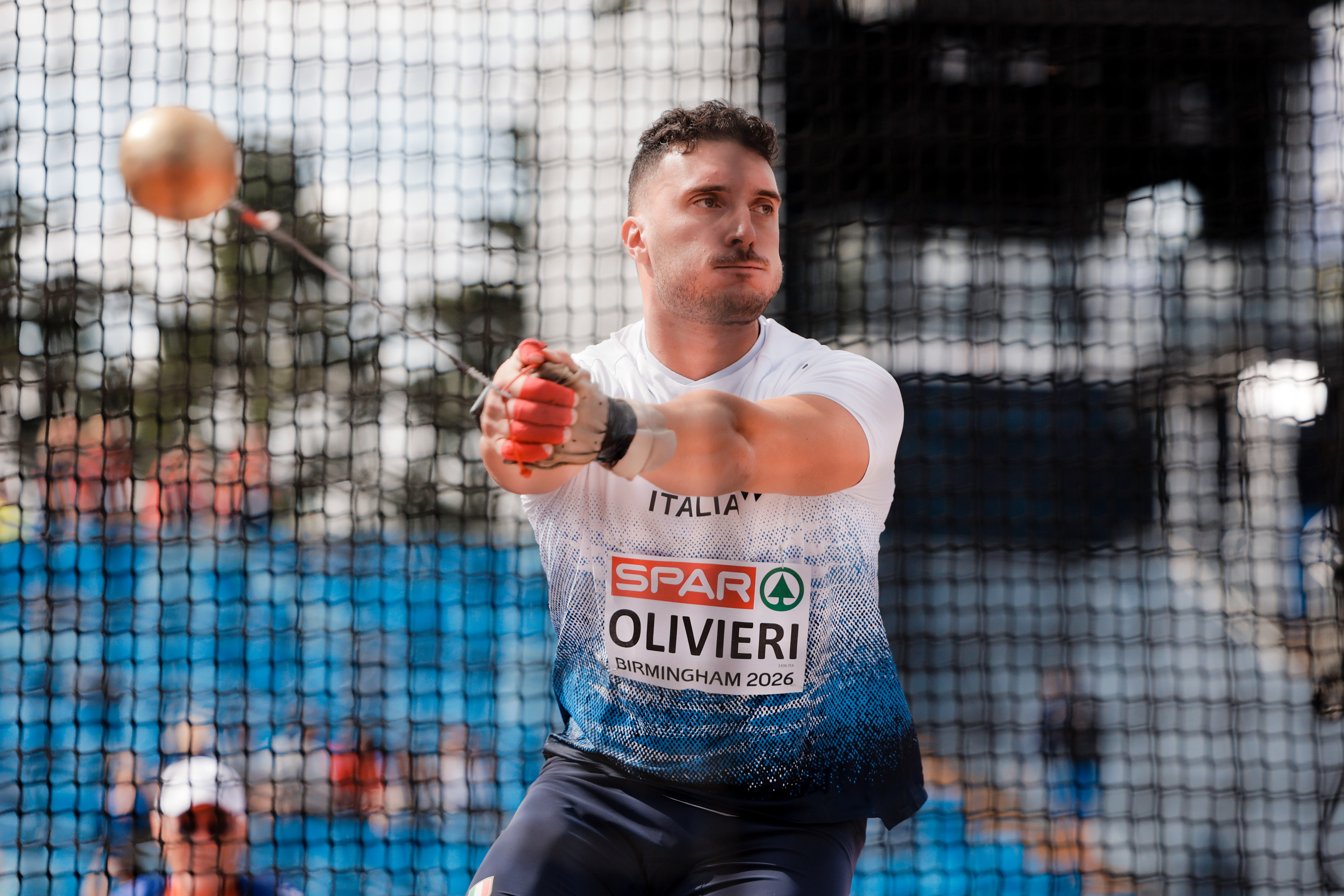
- Olivieri at Birmingham 2026

Personal information
- National team: Italy
- Born: 5 November 2000 (age 25) Fermo, Italy
- Height: 1.82 m (6 ft 0 in)
- Weight: 94 kg (207 lb)

Sport
- Sport: Athletics
- Event: Hammer throw
- Club: Carabinieri Bologna
- Coached by: Nicola Silvaggi

Achievements and titles
- Personal best: Hammer throw: 74.39 m (2022)
Medal record
Men's athletics
Representing Italy
Mediterranean Games
Bronze medal – third place	2022 Oran	Hammer throw
World University Games
Bronze medal – third place	2025 Bochum	Hammer throw

Giorgio Olivieri (born 5 November 2000) is an Italian hammer thrower who won bronze medal at the 2025 Summer World University Games and five senior national championships.

== Career ==
He competed at the 2025 World Athletics Championships and at the 2026 European Athletics Championships. He is among the Italian national athletics team's squad members for the 2026 Mediterranean Games.

== Achievements ==
Year	Competition	Venue	Position	Event	Measure	-
Young level
2019	European U20 Championships	(Sweden) Boras	3rd	Hammer throw	78.75 m	(Note: At U20 level hammer weighs less: 6 kg.)
2022	European Throwing U23 Cup	(Portugal) Leiria	3rd	Hammer throw	70.84 m	
2022	Mediterranean Athletics U23 Championships	(Italy) Pescara	2nd	Hammer throw	71.09 m	
Senior level
2022	Mediterranean Games	(Algeria) Oran	3rd	Hammer throw	72.18 m	
2025	World University Games	(Germany) Bochum	3rd	Hammer throw	73.78 m	SB
2025	World Championships	(Japan) Tokyo	Qual.	Hammer throw	71.41 m	
2026	European Championships	(United Kingdom) Birmingham	Qual.	Hammer throw	71.83 m	

== National titles ==
Olivieri won five national championships at individual senior level.

- Italian Athletics Championships
  - Hammer throw: 2025, 2026 (2)
- Italian Winter Throwing Championships
  - Hammer throw: 2022, 2023, 2025 (3)
