= Andreas Dimitrakis =

Greek middle-distance runner

Personal information
- Nationality: Greek
- Born: September 8, 1990 (age 35) Athens, Greece
- Height: 1.88 m (6 ft 2 in)
- Weight: 73 kg (161 lb)

Sport
- Sport: Track
- Event(s): 800 meters, 1500 meters, mile
- Club: ARETE International AC

Achievements and titles
- Personal best(s): 800m: 1:47.35; 1500m: 3:39.32

Andreas Dimitrakis (born September 8, 1990) is a Greek middle-distance runner. He made his international debut with the Greece national team at the 2010 European Team Championships Super League, and since then competed at the same competition in 2011, 2013, and 2014. He graduated from Panteion University in 2015 with a degree in European and International Studies.

== Running career ==
Dimitrakis first began training for the 400 and 800 meter disciplines before specializing in the 1500, which he raced most frequently throughout his career in Europe. At the 2012 European Athletics Championships, he ran in the men's 800 meters but did not qualify for the final round. After this he focused on the 1500, and qualified for the 2013 European Athletics Indoor Championships, where he placed 12th out of 23rd competitors in the men's 1500.

In September 2015, he was invited by coach Jeff Vargas to move to Tarpon Springs, Florida in the United States in order to find athletic sponsors and have more stable training. Since then, he signed with ARETE International Athletic Club, and also got sponsored by real estate businessman Giorgos Veronis from Naxos, Greece. On January 14, 2016, Dimitrakis made his mile race debut at the Armory Track in New York City, where he won the race in a time of 4:01.89.
