= Tamara Salaški =

Serbian sprinter

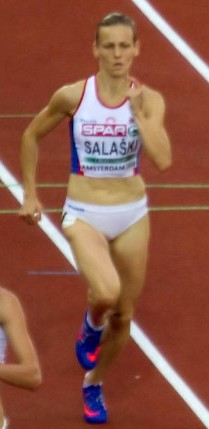
- Tamara Salaški in 2016

Personal information
- Born: 16 October 1988 (age 37) Valjevo, Socialist Republic of Serbia, Yugoslavia
- Height: 1.65 m (5 ft 5 in)
- Weight: 54 kg (119 lb)

Sport
- Country: Serbia
- Sport: Track and field
- Event: 400 metres

Achievements and titles
- Personal bests: 400 m: 51.89 (2016, NR); 400 m short track: 52.99 (2017)

Tamara Salaški (Serbian Cyrillic: Тамара Салашки; born 16 October 1988) is a Serbian sprinter. She competed for Serbia at the 2016 Rio Olympics with a result of 52.70 seconds. Her personal best is 51.89.

== Career ==
Salaški set a Serbian national record in the women's 400 metres in Stara Zagora, Bulgaria when she ran the event in a time of 51.89 seconds in June 2016. This time was within the Olympic qualifying mark of 52.20 seconds, so it resulted in her qualification for the 2016 Summer Olympics in Rio de Janeiro. In July of that year, she competed in the 400 metres at the 2016 European Athletics Championships.

She ran in heat two of the women's 400 metres in Rio, finishing third in her heat behind American Allyson Felix and Olha Zemlyak of Ukraine. Her time of 52.70 seconds was 37th overall, with only the top two from each heat, plus the next eight fastest runners qualifying for the semi-finals.

In February 2017 in Banjica, Salaški set a new national record in the indoor 400 metres, coming home in 52.99 seconds. In August of that year, Salaški competed in the 400 metres at the World Championships in Athletics in London. Running in the heats, she recorded a time of 52.13 seconds on her way to a fifth-place finish in heat six. This was marginally insufficient to advance to the semi-finals, ending her competition.

At the 2018 European Athletics Championships in Berlin, Salaški qualified for the semi-finals of the 400 metres after running a time of 52.39 seconds in the heats. In the semi-finals she ran a time of 53.20 which was last in her race for a result of 24th overall in the competition.
