= Teodora Simović =

Serbian athlete

Personal information
- Nationality: Serbian
- Born: 27 October 1993 (age 32)

Sport
- Sport: Long-distance running
- Event: Marathon

Teodora Simović (born 27 October 1993) is a Serbian long-distance runner. She competed in the women's marathon at the 2017 World Championships in Athletics.
