= 1997 World Championships in Athletics – Men's hammer throw =

These are the official results of the men's hammer throw event at the 1997 World Championships in Athens, Greece. There were a total number of 43 participating athletes, with the final held on Sunday 3 August 1997.

== Medalists ==
Gold	Heinz Weis; Germany (GER)
Silver	Andriy Skvaruk; Ukraine (UKR)
Bronze	Vasiliy Sidorenko; Russia (RUS)

== Schedule ==
- All times are Eastern European Time (UTC+2)

Qualification Round
Group A	Group B
02.08.1997 – 08:00h	02.08.1997 – 10:00h
Final Round
03.08.1997 – 17:30h

== Abbreviations ==
- All results shown are in metres

Q	automatic qualification
q	qualification by rank
DNS	did not start
NM	no mark
WR	world record
AR	area record
NR	national record
PB	personal best
SB	season best

== Records ==
Standing records prior to the 1997 World Athletics Championships
World Record	Yuriy Sedykh (URS)	86.74 m	August 30, 1986	Stuttgart, West Germany
Event Record	Sergey Litvinov (URS)	83.06 m	September 1, 1987	Rome, Italy
Season Best	Heinz Weis (GER)	83.04 m	June 29, 1997	Frankfurt, Germany

== Qualification ==
=== Group A ===
Rank	Overall	Athlete	Attempts			Distance
Rank	Overall	Athlete	1	2	3	Distance
1	3	Vasiliy Sidorenko (RUS)	74.42	77.94	—	77.94 m
2	4	Andriy Skvaruk (UKR)	X	77.94	—	77.94 m
3	5	Heinz Weis (GER)	75.86	77.12	—	77.12 m
4	9	Raphaël Piolanti (FRA)	74.42	75.04	76.12	76.12 m
5	11	Oleksandr Krykun (UKR)	74.26	75.32	75.26	75.32 m
6	12	Koji Murofushi (JPN)	75.28	74.50	73.50	75.28 m
7	13	Holger Klose (GER)	75.16	X	74.18	75.16 m
8	15	Andrey Abduvaliyev (UZB)	68.92	74.30	74.96	74.96 m
9	17	Stuart Rendell (AUS)	74.28	X	X	74.28 m
10	18	Pavel Sedláček (CZE)	73.94	73.84	73.76	73.94 m
11	19	Alexandros Papadimitriou (GRE)	73.92	X	73.48	73.92 m
12	21	Marko Wahlman (FIN)	73.00	72.22	73.60	73.60 m
13	22	Nicola Vizzoni (ITA)	71.52	73.42	72.62	73.42 m
14	23	Kevin McMahon (USA)	X	66.92	72.42	72.42 m
15	25	Jud Logan (USA)	X	70.66	71.92	71.92 m
16	26	Zsolt Németh (HUN)	71.80	X	X	71.80 m
17	28	Maciej Pałyszko (POL)	71.54	71.32	69.02	71.54 m
18	31	David Chaussinand (FRA)	71.20	70.20	68.54	71.20 m
19	33	Aleksandr Krasko (BLR)	70.84	X	X	70.84 m
20	38	Nikolaos Gentekos (GRE)	67.36	66.84	—	67.36 m
21	40	Brentt Jones (GBR)	49.30	53.04	52.60	53.04 m
22	41	Enrique Reina (HON)	47.92	—	—	47.92 m

=== Group B ===
Rank	Overall	Athlete	Attempts			Distance
Rank	Overall	Athlete	1	2	3	Distance
1	1	Balázs Kiss (HUN)	80.46	—	—	80.46 m
2	2	Igor Astapkovich (BLR)	75.90	77.96	—	77.96 m
3	6	Vadim Khersontsev (RUS)	76.44	75.58	75.12	76.44 m
4	7	Ilya Konovalov (RUS)	75.86	76.36	74.18	76.36 m
5	8	Karsten Kobs (GER)	72.96	76.20	X	76.20 m
6	10	Ivan Tikhon (BLR)	75.08	75.74	X	75.74 m
7	14	Vadim Kolesnik (UKR)	74.86	75.16	73.12	75.16 m
8	16	Enrico Sgrulletti (ITA)	74.70	73.50	72.84	74.70 m
9	20	Jan Bielecki (DEN)	71.70	73.36	73.82	73.82 m
10	24	Zoltán Fábián (HUN)	69.68	71.92	72.12	72.12 m
11	27	Christos Polychroniou (GRE)	71.56	X	X	71.56 m
12	29	David Popejoy (USA)	71.52	—	—	71.52 m
13	30	Loris Paoluzzi (ITA)	71.50	X	X	71.50 m
14	32	David Smith (GBR)	70.94	—	—	70.94 m
15	34	Vladimír Maška (CZE)	X	X	70.50	70.50 m
16	35	Vítor Costa (POR)	70.04	68.66	X	70.04 m
17	36	Hakim Toumi (ALG)	66.94	68.32	67.62	68.32 m
18	37	Roman Linscheid (IRL)	X	X	67.96	67.96 m
19	39	Eduardo Acuña (PER)	X	57.78	60.14	60.14 m
—	—	Christophe Épalle (FRA)	X	X	X	NM
—	—	Naser Al Husaini (KUW)	X	X	X	NM

== Final ==
Rank	Athlete	Attempts						Distance	Note
Rank	Athlete	1	2	3	4	5	6	Distance	Note
1st place, gold medalist(s)	Heinz Weis (GER)	X	77.54	80.24	80.52	81.14	81.78	81.78 m	
2nd place, silver medalist(s)	Andrey Skvaruk (UKR)	76.88	76.94	X	78.04	X	81.46	81.46 m	
3rd place, bronze medalist(s)	Vasiliy Sidorenko (RUS)	78.26	79.10	79.80	80.38	80.76	78.32	80.76 m	
4	Balázs Kiss (HUN)	77.86	78.32	X	79.32	79.96	79.28	79.96 m	
5	Igor Astapkovich (BLR)	X	X	78.12	79.70	77.94	78.72	79.70 m	
6	Ilya Konovalov (RUS)	75.18	76.60	76.46	77.36	78.12	78.68	78.68 m	
7	Vadim Khersontsev (RUS)	76.24	77.42	77.00	X	X	X	77.42 m	
8	Oleksandr Krykun (UKR)	75.02	76.44	75.26	76.62	77.14	76.76	77.14 m	
9	Karsten Kobs (GER)	76.12	74.94	X				76.12 m	
10	Koji Murofushi (JPN)	74.82	74.50	X				74.82 m	
11	Raphaël Piolanti (FRA)	74.08	73.26	73.44				74.08 m	
—	Ivan Tikhon (BLR)	X	X	X				NM	

== See also ==
- 1996 Men's Olympic Hammer Throw (Atlanta)
- 1997 Hammer Throw Year Ranking
- 1998 Men's European Championships Hammer Throw (Budapest)
- 2000 Men's Olympic Hammer Throw (Sydney)
