= 1999 World Championships in Athletics – Men's hammer throw =

This article documents the official results of the Men's Hammer Throw event at the 1999 World Championships in Seville, Spain. There were a total number of 39 participating athletes, with the final held on Sunday 22 August 1999.

== Medalists ==
| Gold | Karsten Kobs; Germany (GER) |
| Silver | Zsolt Németh; Hungary (HUN) |
| Bronze | Vladyslav Piskunov; Ukraine (UKR) |

== Schedule ==
- All times are Central European Time (UTC+1)

Qualification Round
| Group A | Group B |
|---|---|
| 21.08.1999 – 10:00h | 21.08.1999 – 12:00h |
Final Round
22.08.1999 – 21:45h

== Abbreviations ==
- All results shown are in metres

| Q | automatic qualification |
| q | qualification by rank |
| DNS | did not start |
| NM | no mark |
| WR | world record |
| AR | area record |
| NR | national record |
| PB | personal best |
| SB | season best |

== Records ==
Standing records prior to the 1999 World Athletics Championships
| World Record | Yuriy Sedykh (URS) | 86.74 m | August 30, 1986 | Stuttgart, West Germany |
| Event Record | Sergey Litvinov (URS) | 83.06 m | September 1, 1987 | Rome, Italy |
| Season Best | Karsten Kobs (GER) | 82.78 m | June 26, 1999 | Dortmund, Germany |

== Qualification ==
=== Group A ===
| Rank | Overall | Athlete | Attempts | | | Distance |
| Rank | Overall | Athlete | 1 | 2 | 3 | Distance |
|---|---|---|---|---|---|---|
| 1 | 1 | Karsten Kobs (GER) | 78.91 | — | — | 78.91 m |
| 2 | 3 | Zsolt Németh (HUN) | X | 76.18 | 77.56 | 77.56 m |
| 3 | 6 | Vladyslav Piskunov (UKR) | 76.09 | 76.99 | 76.67 | 76.99 m |
| 4 | 8 | Olli-Pekka Karjalainen (FIN) | 74.23 | 75.11 | 75.89 | 75.89 m |
| 5 | 9 | Nicola Vizzoni (ITA) | 75.55 | X | 75.81 | 75.81 m |
| 6 | 12 | Vadim Khersontsev (RUS) | 71.90 | 74.29 | 75.42 | 75.42 m |
| 7 | 13 | Lance Deal (USA) | 73.28 | 73.66 | 75.29 | 75.29 m |
| 8 | 15 | Andrey Abduvaliyev (UZB) | 72.36 | 75.12 | 72.91 | 75.12 m |
| 9 | 17 | Vasiliy Sidorenko (RUS) | 73.01 | 74.85 | 73.04 | 74.85 m |
| 10 | 20 | Balázs Kiss (HUN) | 74.61 | 73.96 | X | 74.61 m |
| 11 | 22 | Raphaël Piolanti (FRA) | 72.76 | 73.38 | 74.23 | 74.23 m |
| 12 | 23 | Szymon Ziółkowski (POL) | 72.90 | X | 74.12 | 74.12 m |
| 13 | 26 | András Haklits (CRO) | 71.67 | 72.89 | 73.28 | 73.28 m |
| 14 | 27 | Alexandros Papadimitriou (GRE) | X | 72.97 | X | 72.97 m |
| 15 | 28 | Pavel Sedláček (CZE) | 70.66 | 72.63 | 72.48 | 72.63 m |
| 16 | 30 | Chris Harmse (RSA) | X | 71.57 | 65.06 | 71.57 m |
| 17 | 32 | Libor Charfreitag (SVK) | X | 69.92 | 70.20 | 70.20 m |
| 18 | 36 | Stuart Rendell (AUS) | 67.55 | X | X | 67.55 m |
| — | — | Holger Klose (GER) | X | X | X | NM |

=== Group B ===
| Rank | Overall | Athlete | Attempts | | | Distance |
| Rank | Overall | Athlete | 1 | 2 | 3 | Distance |
|---|---|---|---|---|---|---|
| 1 | 2 | Igor Astapkovich (BLR) | 76.11 | 77.75 | — | 77.75 m |
| 2 | 4 | Andriy Skvaruk (UKR) | 77.42 | — | — | 77.42 m |
| 3 | 5 | Tibor Gécsek (HUN) | 76.47 | 75.35 | 77.27 | 77.27 m |
| 4 | 7 | Christos Polychroniou (GRE) | 76.55 | 76.82 | Ab | 76.82 m |
| 5 | 10 | Vladimír Maška (CZE) | 75.78 | 72.62 | 74.93 | 75.78 m |
| 6 | 11 | Ilya Konovalov (RUS) | 74.18 | 74.63 | 75.72 | 75.72 m |
| 7 | 14 | Koji Murofushi (JPN) | 74.04 | 75.18 | 73.68 | 75.18 m |
| 8 | 16 | Marko Wahlman (FIN) | 74.32 | 75.04 | 74.58 | 75.04 m |
| 9 | 18 | Heinz Weis (GER) | 74.71 | 74.71 | 72.98 | 74.71 m |
| 10 | 19 | Kevin McMahon (USA) | 74.62 | 73.84 | X | 74.62 m |
| 11 | 21 | Loris Paoluzzi (ITA) | 72.75 | 74.26 | X | 74.26 m |
| 12 | 24 | David Chaussinand (FRA) | 71.64 | 72.83 | 74.02 | 74.02 m |
| 13 | 25 | Gilles Dupray (FRA) | 73.32 | 71.70 | 69.62 | 73.32 m |
| 14 | 29 | Maciej Pałyszko (POL) | 69.60 | 72.05 | 71.57 | 72.05 m |
| 15 | 31 | Juan Ignacio Cerra (ARG) | 69.72 | 71.24 | 69.83 | 71.24 m |
| 16 | 33 | Vítor Costa (POR) | 68.35 | 67.44 | 69.28 | 69.28 m |
| 17 | 34 | Paddy McGrath (IRL) | 66.51 | 68.96 | 65.80 | 68.96 m |
| 18 | 35 | Vadim Kolesnik (UKR) | X | 68.14 | 67.96 | 68.14 m |
| 19 | 37 | Nikolay Davydov (KGZ) | 66.87 | 64.76 | 65.08 | 66.87 m |
| — | — | Jan Bielecki (DEN) | — | — | — | DNS |

== Final ==
| Rank | Athlete | Attempts | | | | | | Distance |
| Rank | Athlete | 1 | 2 | 3 | 4 | 5 | 6 | Distance |
|---|---|---|---|---|---|---|---|---|
| 1st place, gold medalist(s) | Karsten Kobs (GER) | 80.24 | 78.87 | 79.90 | X | 79.12 | 78.00 | 80.24 m |
| 2nd place, silver medalist(s) | Zsolt Németh (HUN) | 74.52 | 76.15 | X | X | 77.72 | 79.05 | 79.05 m |
| 3rd place, bronze medalist(s) | Vladyslav Piskunov (UKR) | 77.38 | 77.94 | 77.92 | 77.25 | 79.03 | 76.39 | 79.03 m |
| 4 | Tibor Gécsek (HUN) | X | X | 78.16 | X | 78.95 | 73.77 | 78.95 m |
| 5 | Andrey Skvaruk (UKR) | 78.80 | 77.35 | 77.14 | 77.87 | X | X | 78.80 m |
| 6 | Christos Polychroniou (GRE) | 76.43 | 78.31 | X | 77.01 | 77.15 | 76.84 | 78.31 m |
| 7 | Nicola Vizzoni (ITA) | 76.54 | 77.07 | 74.89 | 74.76 | 78.31 | X | 78.31 m |
| 8 | Vadim Khersontsev (RUS) | 76.17 | 76.73 | X | 76.96 | 76.30 | 74.05 | 76.96 m |
| 9 | Igor Astapkovich (BLR) | 74.98 | 76.02 | 75.50 | | | | 76.02 m |
| 10 | Ilya Konovalov (RUS) | X | 74.52 | 75.63 | | | | 75.63 m |
| 11 | Olli-Pekka Karjalainen (FIN) | X | 75.59 | X | | | | 75.59 m |
| 12 | Vladimír Maška (CZE) | X | 75.26 | X | | | | 75.26 m |

== See also ==
- 1996 Men's Olympic Hammer Throw (Atlanta)
- 1998 Men's European Championships Hammer Throw (Budapest)
- 1999 Hammer Throw Year Ranking
- 2000 Men's Olympic Hammer Throw (Sydney)
- 2002 Men's European Championships Hammer Throw (Munich)
