= Athletics at the 1995 Summer Universiade – Men's hammer throw =

The men's hammer throw event at the 1995 Summer Universiade was held on 29 August at the Hakatanomori Athletic Stadium in Fukuoka, Japan.

== Results ==
Rank	Athlete	Nationality	#1	#2	#3	#4	#5	#6	Result	Notes
1st place, gold medalist(s)	Balázs Kiss	Hungary	77.92	77.62	78.70	79.74	79.72	x	79.74	
2nd place, silver medalist(s)	Oleksandr Krykun	Ukraine	73.96	74.02	75.10	74.16	75.80	77.06	77.06	
3rd place, bronze medalist(s)	Sergey Gavrilov	Russia	x	75.50	x	x	x	x	75.50	
4	Vadim Kolesnik	Ukraine	74.34	x	73.58	x	72.90	x	74.34	
5	Kevin McMahon	United States	70.88	74.30	x	x	72.52	x	74.30	
6	Zsolt Németh	Hungary	71.44	73.04	x	72.42	x	74.12	74.12	
7	Karsten Kobs	Germany	70.92	73.32	x	73.08	x	x	73.32	
8	David Chaussinand	France	70.52	73.10	71.04	x	73.26	71.60	73.26	
9	Szymon Ziółkowski	Poland	70.16	72.56	72.94				72.94	
10	Claus Dethloff	Germany	70.28	x	72.16				72.16	
11	Aleksandr Krasko	Belarus	x	x	71.40				71.40	
12	Gilles Dupray	France	67.44	x	70.96				70.96	
13	Nicola Vizzoni	Italy	68.96	x	70.70				70.70	
14	David Popejoy	United States	67.78	65.36	68.58				68.58	
15	Koji Murofushi	Japan	x	67.58	x				67.58	
16	Roman Linscheid	Ireland	x	66.14	x				66.14	
17	Vítor Costa	Portugal	64.22	65.68	63.92				65.68	
18	Vladimir Kevo	Slovenia	65.22	x	64.34				65.22	
19	Wataru Ebihara	Japan	60.70	62.30	63.44				63.44	
20	Eduardo Acuña	Peru	x	x	54.54				54.54	
