= Athletics at the 1993 Summer Universiade – Men's hammer throw =

The men's hammer throw event at the 1993 Summer Universiade was held at the UB Stadium in Buffalo, United States on 16 July 1993.

== Results ==
Rank	Athlete	Nationality	Result	Notes
1st place, gold medalist(s)	Vadim Kolesnik	Ukraine	77.00	
2nd place, silver medalist(s)	Balázs Kiss	Hungary	76.88	
3rd place, bronze medalist(s)	Christophe Épalle	France	76.80	
4	Valeriy Gubkin	Belarus	74.34	
5	Ilya Konovalov	Russia	73.52	
6	Savvas Saritzoglou	Greece	72.98	
7	Alberto Sánchez	Cuba	72.24	
8	Gilles Dupray	France	70.98	
9	Oleksandr Krykun	Ukraine	70.42	
10	Jörn Hübner	Germany	69.54	
11	Kevin McMahon	United States	67.50	
12	Hristos Polihroniou	Greece	67.22	
13	Giovanni Sanguin	Italy	66.88	
14	Oliver Sack	Switzerland	66.22	
15	Ken Popejoy	United States	65.44	
16	Alex Marfull	Spain	63.70	
17	Zsolt Németh	Hungary	62.66	
18	Paddy McGrath	Ireland	62.02	
