= 1998 European Athletics Championships – Men's hammer throw =

Men's hammer throw at the European Athletics Championships

These are the official results of the Men's hammer throw event at the 1998 European Championships in Budapest, Hungary. Thirty-six athletes took part. The qualification mark was set at 77.00 metres.

== Medalists ==
Gold	Tibor Gécsek; Hungary (HUN)
Silver	Balázs Kiss; Hungary (HUN)
Bronze	Karsten Kobs; Germany (GER)

== Schedule ==
- All times are Central European Time (UTC+1)

Qualification Round
Group A	Group B
18.08.1998 – ??:??h	18.08.1998 – ??:??h
Final Round
19.08.1998 – ??:??h

== Abbreviations ==
- All results shown are in metres

Q	automatic qualification
q	qualification by rank
DNS	did not start
NM	no mark
WR	world record
AR	area record
NR	national record
PB	personal best
SB	season best

== Records ==
Standing records prior to the 1998 European Athletics Championships
World Record	Yuriy Sedykh (URS)	86.74 m	August 30, 1986	Stuttgart, West Germany
Event Record	Yuriy Sedykh (URS)	86.74 m	August 30, 1986	Stuttgart, West Germany

== Qualification ==
=== Group A ===
Rank	Overall	Athlete	Attempts			Distance
Rank	Overall	Athlete	1	2	3	Distance
1	1	Adrián Annus (HUN)	76.29	79.52		79.52 m
2	5	Hristos Polihroniou (GRE)	77.99			77.99 m
3	6	Heinz Weis (GER)	77.46			77.46 m
4	7	Igor Astapkovich (BLR)	77.43			77.43 m
5	8	Szymon Ziółkowski (POL)	76.66			76.66 m
6	10	Vladyslav Piskunov (UKR)				76.24 m
7	13	Vasiliy Sidorenko (RUS)	75.07	75.60	75.56	75.56 m
8	14	Andrey Skvaruk (UKR)				75.56 m
9	15	Loris Paoluzzi (ITA)				75.00 m
10	16	Enrico Sgrulletti (ITA)				74.91 m
11	18	Sergey Kirmasov (RUS)				74.50 m
12	21	Gilles Dupray (FRA)	73.92	73.21		73.92 m
13	22	András Haklits (CRO)	71.18	x	73.41	73.41 m
14	25	Pavel Sedláček (CZE)				72.68 m
15	28	Vítor Costa (POR)				72.28 m
16	30	Ivan Tikhon (BLR)				71.50 m
17	33	Paddy McGrath (IRL)				66.25 m
—	—	Marko Wahlman (FIN)	x	x	x	NM

=== Group B ===
Rank	Overall	Athlete	Attempts			Distance
Rank	Overall	Athlete	1	2	3	Distance
1	2	Tibor Gécsek (HUN)	79.44			79.44 m
2	3	Ilya Konovalov (RUS)				78.09 m
3	4	Balázs Kiss (HUN)	x	78.06		78.06 m
4	9	Karsten Kobs (GER)				76.67 m
5	11	Oleksandr Krykun (UKR)				75.90 m
6	12	Christophe Épalle (FRA)				75.75 m
7	17	Nicola Vizzoni (ITA)				74.65 m
8	19	Vladimír Maška (CZE)				74.12 m
9	20	Holger Klose (GER)				74.05 m
10	23	David Chaussinand (FRA)				73.30 m
11	24	Olli-Pekka Karjalainen (FIN)				73.13 m
12	26	Jan Bielecki (DEN)				72.48 m
13	27	Alexandros Papadimitriou (GRE)				72.47 m
14	29	Maciej Pałyszko (POL)				72.03 m
15	31	Nikolay Avlasevich (BLR)				69.11 m
16	32	Per Karlsson (SWE)				67.20 m
17	34	Dorian Collaku (ALB)				64.88 m
18	35	Roman Linscheid (IRL)				63.75 m

== Final ==
Rank	Athlete	Attempts						Distance	Note
Rank	Athlete	1	2	3	4	5	6	Distance	Note
1st place, gold medalist(s)	Tibor Gécsek (HUN)	80.94	X	81.66	X	82.87	82.25	82.87 m	
2nd place, silver medalist(s)	Balázs Kiss (HUN)	80.96	80.71	X	78.87	80.38	81.26	81.26 m	
3rd place, bronze medalist(s)	Karsten Kobs (GER)	X	77.83	75.22	X	80.13	X	80.13 m	
4	Heinz Weis (GER)	76.89	80.04	78.79	X	77.28	77.15	80.04 m	
5	Szymon Ziółkowski (POL)	X	X	77.37	X	X	78.16	78.16 m	
6	Hristos Polihroniou (GRE)	X	77.97	X	74.95	77.43	X	77.97 m	
7	Igor Astapkovich (BLR)	X	X	77.81	X	X	76.93	77.81 m	
8	Adrián Annus (HUN)	75.77	76.19	X	77.29	76.43	76.09	77.29 m	
9	Ilya Konovalov (RUS)	76.11	75.66	75.32				76.11 m	
10	Vladyslav Piskunov (UKR)	X	74.30	75.10				75.10 m	
11	Oleksandr Krykun (UKR)	74.34	73.41	X				74.34 m	
12	Christophe Épalle (FRA)	70.33	74.00	73.82				74.00 m	

== See also ==
- 1995 Men's World Championships Hammer Throw (Gothenburg)
- 1996 Men's Olympic Hammer Throw (Atlanta)
- 1997 Men's World Championships Hammer Throw (Athens)
- 1998 Hammer Throw Year Ranking
- 1999 Men's World Championships Hammer Throw (Seville)
- 2000 Men's Olympic Hammer Throw (Sydney)
