= 1995 World Championships in Athletics – Men's hammer throw =

These are the official results of the Men's Hammer Throw event at the 1995 World Championships in Gothenburg, Sweden. There were a total number of 44 participating athletes, with the final held on Sunday August 6, 1995. The qualification mark was set at 76.50 metres.

== Medalists ==
| Gold | Andrey Abduvaliyev; Tajikistan (TJK) |
| Silver | Igor Astapkovich; Belarus (BLR) |
| Bronze | Tibor Gécsek; Hungary (HUN) |

== Schedule ==
- All times are Central European Time (UTC+1)

Qualification Round
| Group A | Group B |
|---|---|
| 05.08.1995 – 11:00h | 05.08.1995 – 13:00h |
Final Round
06.08.1995 – 14:15h

== Abbreviations ==
- All results shown are in metres

| Q | automatic qualification |
| q | qualification by rank |
| DNS | did not start |
| NM | no mark |
| WR | world record |
| AR | area record |
| NR | national record |
| PB | personal best |
| SB | season best |

== Records ==
Standing records prior to the 1995 World Athletics Championships
| World Record | Yuriy Sedykh (URS) | 86.74 m | August 30, 1986 | Stuttgart, West Germany |
| Event Record | Sergey Litvinov (URS) | 83.06 m | September 1, 1987 | Rome, Italy |
| Season Best | Igor Astapkovich (BLR) | 82.60 m | May 29, 1995 | Szombathely, Hungary |

== Qualification ==
=== Group A ===
| Rank | Overall | Athlete | Attempts | | | Distance |
| Rank | Overall | Athlete | 1 | 2 | 3 | Distance |
|---|---|---|---|---|---|---|
| 1 | 2 | Igor Astapkovich (BLR) | 79.12 | — | — | 79.12 m |
| 2 | 4 | Lance Deal (USA) | 76.38 | 76.70 | — | 76.70 m |
| 3 | 5 | Tibor Gécsek (HUN) | 76.64 | — | — | 76.64 m |
| 4 | 7 | Aleksandr Seleznyov (RUS) | 72.76 | 76.16 | 74.04 | 76.16 m |
| 5 | 8 | Ilya Konovalov (RUS) | 75.58 | — | — | 75.58 m |
| 6 | 12 | Oleksandr Krykun (UKR) | 72.32 | 74.48 | 74.30 | 74.48 m |
| 7 | 18 | Enrico Sgrulletti (ITA) | X | 71.82 | 72.60 | 72.60 m |
| 8 | 19 | Plamen Minev (BUL) | 70.94 | 72.60 | 67.90 | 72.60 m |
| 9 | 20 | Per Karlsson (SWE) | X | 70.54 | 72.48 | 72.48 m |
| 10 | 21 | Mika Laaksonen (FIN) | 71.46 | 71.72 | 72.20 | 72.20 m |
| 11 | 22 | Szymon Ziółkowski (POL) | 71.08 | 71.84 | 71.30 | 71.84 m |
| 12 | 24 | Zoltán Fábián (HUN) | 69.36 | 71.06 | 71.02 | 71.06 m |
| 13 | 26 | Gilles Dupray (FRA) | 68.98 | 70.46 | 69.64 | 70.46 m |
| 14 | 27 | Claus Dethloff (GER) | 67.14 | 69.64 | X | 69.64 m |
| 15 | 30 | José Manuel Perez (ESP) | 68.42 | 67.10 | 65.28 | 68.42 m |
| 16 | 33 | Pavel Sedláček (CZE) | X | 66.14 | 67.94 | 67.94 m |
| 17 | 34 | Peter Vivian (GBR) | X | 67.28 | 65.90 | 67.28 m |
| 18 | 36 | Vitaliy Khozhatelev (UZB) | 65.60 | 66.46 | 65.82 | 66.46 m |
| 19 | 39 | Waleed Al-Bekheet (KUW) | X | 59.22 | 61.50 | 61.50 m |
| 20 | 41 | Agustin Jarina (PHI) | 49.98 | 49.94 | — | 49.98 m |
| — | — | Hristos Polihroniou (GRE) | X | X | X | NM |
| — | — | Heinz Weis (GER) | — | — | — | DNS |

=== Group B ===
| Rank | Overall | Athlete | Attempts | | | Distance |
| Rank | Overall | Athlete | 1 | 2 | 3 | Distance |
|---|---|---|---|---|---|---|
| 1 | 1 | Andrey Abduvaliyev (TJK) | 75.50 | 79.18 | — | 79.18 m |
| 2 | 3 | Balázs Kiss (HUN) | 78.04 | — | — | 78.04 m |
| 3 | 6 | Raphaël Piolanti (FRA) | 74.00 | 76.26 | — | 76.26 m |
| 4 | 9 | Sergey Alay (BLR) | 74.38 | 75.36 | X | 75.36 m |
| 5 | 10 | Vadim Kolesnik (UKR) | X | 74.86 | X | 74.86 m |
| 6 | 11 | Marko Wahlman (FIN) | 74.60 | X | 73.64 | 74.60 m |
| 7 | 13 | Tore Gustafsson (SWE) | 72.64 | 71.92 | 74.44 | 74.44 m |
| 8 | 14 | Sean Carlin (AUS) | 73.02 | 71.84 | 73.86 | 73.86 m |
| 9 | 15 | Christophe Épalle (FRA) | 72.04 | 73.62 | 72.02 | 73.62 m |
| 10 | 16 | Karsten Kobs (GER) | 72.96 | X | X | 72.96 m |
| 11 | 17 | Jüri Tamm (EST) | 71.06 | X | 72.66 | 72.66 m |
| 12 | 23 | Vasiliy Sidorenko (RUS) | 71.78 | X | 71.22 | 71.78 m |
| 13 | 25 | Lasse Akselin (FIN) | 70.82 | 70.22 | X | 70.82 m |
| 14 | 28 | Kevin McMahon (USA) | 68.40 | 69.14 | 67.58 | 69.14 m |
| 15 | 29 | Jan Bielecki (DEN) | 68.80 | X | X | 68.80 m |
| 16 | 31 | Hakim Toumi (ALG) | 68.36 | 62.68 | 66.40 | 68.36 m |
| 17 | 32 | Roman Linscheid (IRL) | 68.14 | 68.34 | 68.08 | 68.34 m |
| 18 | 35 | Koji Murofushi (JPN) | 67.06 | X | X | 67.06 m |
| 19 | 37 | Andrés Charadia (ARG) | 66.34 | 65.78 | 64.88 | 66.34 m |
| 20 | 38 | Cherif El Hennawi (EGY) | X | 63.68 | 65.66 | 65.66 m |
| 21 | 40 | Brentt Jones (NFK) | 50.52 | 49.44 | 46.80 | 50.52 m |
| — | — | Alberto Sánchez (CUB) | X | X | X | NM |

== Final ==
| Rank | Athlete | Attempts | | | | | | Distance |
| Rank | Athlete | 1 | 2 | 3 | 4 | 5 | 6 | Distance |
|---|---|---|---|---|---|---|---|---|
| 1st place, gold medalist(s) | Andrey Abduvaliyev (TJK) | 77.68 | 79.10 | 78.22 | 80.12 | 79.00 | 81.56 | 81.56 m |
| 2nd place, silver medalist(s) | Igor Astapkovich (BLR) | X | 79.02 | 79.98 | 81.10 | 80.58 | 80.26 | 81.10 m |
| 3rd place, bronze medalist(s) | Tibor Gécsek (HUN) | 79.20 | 80.40 | 77.94 | 80.98 | X | X | 80.98 m |
| 4 | Balázs Kiss (HUN) | 79.02 | 77.84 | 78.70 | 78.18 | 77.46 | X | 79.02 m |
| 5 | Lance Deal (USA) | X | 73.12 | 76.24 | 77.86 | 78.12 | 78.66 | 78.66 m |
| 6 | Sergey Alay (BLR) | 74.26 | 75.68 | 76.66 | 71.84 | 75.38 | 75.74 | 76.66 m |
| 7 | Ilya Konovalov (RUS) | 75.84 | 75.52 | 76.50 | X | 72.46 | 76.46 | 76.50 m |
| 8 | Aleksandr Seleznyov (RUS) | 76.18 | X | X | X | X | 72.02 | 76.18 m |
| 9 | Raphaël Piolanti (FRA) | 75.98 | X | 75.18 | | | | 75.98 m |
| 10 | Oleksandr Krykun (UKR) | 73.32 | 75.52 | 74.10 | | | | 75.52 m |
| 11 | Vadim Kolesnik (UKR) | X | 75.18 | 74.50 | | | | 75.18 m |
| 12 | Marko Wahlman (FIN) | 73.02 | X | 71.04 | | | | 73.02 m |

== See also ==
- 1992 Men's Olympic Hammer Throw (Barcelona)
- 1994 Men's European Championships Hammer Throw (Helsinki)
- 1995 Hammer Throw Year Ranking
- 1996 Men's Olympic Hammer Throw (Atlanta)
- 1998 Men's European Championships Hammer Throw (Budapest)
