= Athletics at the 1997 Summer Universiade – Men's hammer throw =

The men's hammer throw event at the 1997 Summer Universiade was held at the Stadio Cibali in Catania, Italy, on 26 August.

== Medalists ==
| Gold | Silver | Bronze |
|---|---|---|
| Balázs Kiss; Hungary | Vadim Kolesnik; Ukraine | Ilya Konovalov; Russia |

== Results ==
=== Qualification ===
| Rank | Group | Athlete | Nationality | Results | Notes |
|---|---|---|---|---|---|
| 1 | ? | Vadim Khersontsev | Russia | 73.94 | Q |
| 2 | ? | Balázs Kiss | Hungary | 73.40 | Q |
| 3 | ? | Aleksandr Krasko | Belarus | 71.60 | Q |
| 4 | ? | Nicola Vizzoni | Italy | 71.02 | Q |
| 5 | ? | Koji Murofushi | Japan | 70.42 | Q |
| 6 | ? | Vadym Grabovoyy | Ukraine | 70.18 | Q |
| 6 | ? | Zsolt Németh | Hungary | 70.18 | Q |
| 8 | ? | Jan Bielecki | Denmark | 70.10 | Q |
| 9 | ? | Ilya Konovalov | Russia | 69.78 | Q |
| 10 | ? | David Chaussinand | France | 69.52 | Q |
| 11 | ? | Giovanni Sanguin | Italy | 69.50 | Q |
| 12 | ? | Konstantin Astapkovich | Belarus | 69.32 | Q |
| 13 | ? | Vadim Kolesnik | Ukraine | 68.74 | Q |
| 14 | ? | Paddy McGrath | Ireland | 68.10 | Q |
| 13 | ? | Siniša Svedrović | Croatia | 67.64 | |
| 14 | ? | Mark McGehearty | United States | 63.50 | |
| 15 | ? | Nicolas Rougetet | France | 62.14 | |
| 16 | ? | Eduardo Acuña | Peru | 61.02 | |
| 17 | ? | Andrej Šimonjik | Croatia | 60.62 | |
| 18 | ? | Damir Skripec | Slovenia | 58.00 | |
| 19 | ? | Aleksandr Cojocari | Moldova | 57.20 | |
| 20 | ? | Felipe Rios Garcia | Brazil | 50.40 | |
| 21 | ? | Israel Pérez | Puerto Rico | 50.12 | |
| 22 | ? | Cakra Hadi Mulya | Indonesia | 44.94 | |
| | ? | Vítor Costa | Portugal | NM | |

=== Final ===
| Rank | Athlete | Nationality | Result | Notes |
|---|---|---|---|---|
| 1st place, gold medalist(s) | Balázs Kiss | Hungary | 79.42 | |
| 2nd place, silver medalist(s) | Vadim Kolesnik | Ukraine | 77.16 | |
| 3rd place, bronze medalist(s) | Ilya Konovalov | Russia | 76.16 | |
| 4 | Vadim Khersontsev | Russia | 75.70 | |
| 5 | Nicola Vizzoni | Italy | 75.12 | |
| 6 | Aleksandr Krasko | Belarus | 74.96 | |
| 7 | Konstantin Astapkovich | Belarus | 73.80 | |
| 8 | Koji Murofushi | Japan | 73.46 | |
| 9 | Giovanni Sanguin | Italy | 70.44 | |
| 10 | David Chaussinand | France | 69.72 | |
| 11 | Zsolt Németh | Hungary | 69.60 | |
| 12 | Vadym Grabovoyy | Ukraine | 69.18 | |
| 13 | Jan Bielecki | Denmark | 68.90 | |
| 14 | Paddy McGrath | Ireland | 65.16 | |
