= Athletics at the 1991 Summer Universiade – Men's hammer throw =

Hammer throw event

The men's hammer throw event at the 1991 Summer Universiade was held at the Don Valley Stadium in Sheffield on 20 July 1991.

== Medalists ==
Gold	Silver	Bronze
Ken Flax; United States	Valeriy Gubkin; Soviet Union	Heinz Weis; Germany

== Results ==
=== Qualification ===
Qualification distance: 65.00 metres

Rank	Athlete	Nationality	Result	Notes
1	Aleksandr Seleznyov	Soviet Union	75.00	Q
2	Valeriy Gubkin	Soviet Union	71.72	Q
3	Bi Zhong	China	70.52	Q
4	Christophe Épalle	France	69.58	Q
5	Heinz Weis	Germany	69.30	Q
6	Jörn Hübner	Germany	67.64	Q
7	Sean Carlin	Australia	66.24	Q
8	Alex Marfull	Spain	65.98	Q
9	Ken Flax	United States	65.86	Q
10	Nicola Sundas	Italy	65.66	Q
11	Juha Paasonen	Finland	65.44	Q
12	Mika Laaksonen	Finland	65.42	Q
13	Shane Peacock	Great Britain	65.16	Q
14	Olivier Sack	Switzerland	65.04	Q
15	Antón María Godall	Spain	64.60	
16	Nicolas Rougetet	France	64.58	
17	Zsolt Németh	Hungary	63.96	
18	Michael Morales	United States	62.72	
19	Anders Halvorsen	Norway	60.38	
20	Chris Rowe	Great Britain	59.96	
21	Nikos Anastasiades	Cyprus	57.24	

=== Final ===
Rank	Athlete	Nationality	#1	#2	#3	#4	#5	#6	Result	Notes
1st place, gold medalist(s)	Ken Flax	United States	70.82	74.04	75.94	73.86	75.20	76.46	76.46	
2nd place, silver medalist(s)	Valeriy Gubkin	Soviet Union	74.46	x	74.68	x	76.28	x	76.28	
3rd place, bronze medalist(s)	Heinz Weis	Germany							75.62	
4	Aleksandr Seleznyov	Soviet Union							75.62	
5	Christophe Épalle	France							73.52	
6	Bi Zhong	China							73.14	
7	Jörn Hübner	Germany							70.72	
8	Nicola Sundas	Italy							69.40	
9	Juha Paasonen	Finland							66.92	
10	Mika Laaksonen	Finland							66.88	
11	Sean Carlin	Australia							66.54	
12	Olivier Sack	Switzerland							65.84	
13	Alex Marfull	Spain							65.44	
14	Shane Peacock	Great Britain	63.88	x	x				63.88	
