= Athletics at the 2000 Summer Olympics – Men's hammer throw =

Men's hammer throw at the Games of the XXVII Olympiad
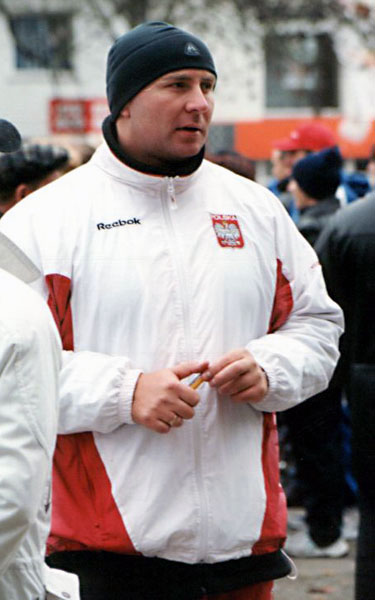
- Szymon Ziółkowski (2001)
- Venue: ANZ Stadium
- Dates: 23 September 2000 (qualifying); 24 September 2000 (final)
- Competitors: 44 from 24 nations
- Winning distance: 80.02

Medalists
1st place, gold medalist(s)		Szymon Ziółkowski; Poland
2nd place, silver medalist(s)		Nicola Vizzoni; Italy
3rd place, bronze medalist(s)		Igor Astapkovich; Belarus

The men's hammer throw at the 2000 Summer Olympics as part of the athletics program was held at the ANZ Stadium on Saturday, 23 September and Sunday, 24 September. There were 44 competitors from 24 nations. The event was won by Szymon Ziółkowski of Poland, the nation's first victory in the event and first medal of any color in the men's hammer throw since 1960. Silver went to Nicola Vizzoni, the first medal winner in the event for Italy. Igor Astapkovich, who had won a silver medal on the Unified Team in 1992, took bronze for the first medal credited to Belarus in the event. Astapkovich was the 11th man to win multiple medals in the hammer throw.

== Background ==
This was the 23rd appearance of the event, which has been held at every Summer Olympics except 1896. Seven of the 12 finalists from the 1996 Games returned: silver medalist (and 1992 finalist) Lance Deal of the United States, fourth-place finisher Andriy Skvaruk of Ukraine, fifth-place finisher (and 1988 and 1992 finalist) Heinz Weis of Germany, sixth-place finisher Ilya Konovalov of Russia, seventh-place finisher (and 1992 silver medalist) Igor Astapkovich of Belarus, tenth-place finisher Szymon Ziółkowski of Poland, and twelfth-place finisher Vasiliy Sidorenko of Russia. Also returning was 1992 Olympic champion Andrey Abduvaliyev, now competing for Uzbekistan. Weis (1997) and Karsten Kobs (199), also of Germany, were the last two World Champions.

Croatia, Kyrgyzstan, Moldova, Slovakia, and Slovenia each made their debut in the event. The United States appeared for the 22nd time, most of any nation, having missed only the boycotted 1980 Games.

== Qualification ==
Each National Olympic Committee was permitted to enter up to three athletes that had thrown 75.50 metres or further during the qualification period. The maximum number of athletes per nation had been set at 3 since the 1930 Olympic Congress. If an NOC had no athletes that qualified under that standard, one athlete that had thrown 72.50 metres or further could be entered.

== Competition format ==
The competition used the two-round format introduced in 1936, with the qualifying round completely separate from the divided final. In qualifying, each athlete received three attempts; those recording a mark of at least 77.50 metres advanced to the final. If fewer than 12 athletes achieved that distance, the top 12 would advance. The results of the qualifying round were then ignored. Finalists received three throws each, with the top eight competitors receiving an additional three attempts. The best distance among those six throws counted.

== Records ==
Prior to the competition, the existing world and Olympic records were as follows.

World record	Yuriy Sedykh (URS)	86.74	Stuttgart, West Germany	30 August 1986
Olympic record	Sergey Litvinov (URS)	84.80	Seoul, South Korea	26 September 1988

No new world or Olympic records were set during the competition.

== Schedule ==
All times are Australian Eastern Standard Time (UTC+10)

Date	Time	Round
Saturday, 23 September 2000	10:00	Qualifying
Sunday, 24 September 2000	20:50	Final

== Results ==
=== Qualifying ===
Rank	Athlete	Nation	1	2	3	Distance	Notes
1	Igor Astapkovich	Belarus	79.81	–	–	79.81	Q
2	Andriy Skvaruk	Ukraine	79.55	–	–	79.55	Q
3	Koji Murofushi	Japan	78.49	–	–	78.49	Q
4	Szymon Ziółkowski	Poland	77.81	–	–	77.81	Q
5	Nicola Vizzoni	Italy	75.31	77.56	–	77.56	Q
6	Tibor Gécsek	Hungary	75.97	X	77.33	77.33	q
7	David Chaussinand	France	77.12	X	X	77.12	q
8	Ilya Konovalov	Russia	77.07	76.93	74.29	77.07	q
9	Loris Paoluzzi	Italy	X	73.63	76.91	76.91	q
10	Ivan Tikhon	Belarus	76.43	76.90	X	76.90	q
11	Vladimír Maška	Czech Republic	X	76.70	75.62	76.70	q
12	Alexandros Papadimitriou	Greece	76.61	74.77	X	76.61	q
13	Maciej Pałyszko	Poland	76.33	X	70.11	76.33	
14	Vladyslav Piskunov	Ukraine	75.95	76.00	76.08	76.08	
15	Andrey Abduvaliyev	Uzbekistan	X	75.64	74.19	75.64	
16	Lance Deal	United States	73.84	75.61	73.93	75.61	
17	Adrián Annus	Hungary	74.01	75.41	X	75.41	
18	Pavel Sedláček	Czech Republic	74.66	72.71	75.33	75.33	
19	Gilles Dupray	France	X	74.71	75.05	75.05	
20	Oleksandr Krykun	Ukraine	74.83	72.49	74.17	74.83	
21	Vasiliy Sidorenko	Russia	74.72	73.97	X	74.72	
22	Aleksey Zagornyi	Russia	70.58	74.00	74.63	74.63	
23	Christophe Épalle	France	70.46	72.70	74.22	74.22	
24	Hristos Polihroniou	Greece	X	X	74.02	74.02	
25	Zsolt Nemeth	Hungary	73.95	X	X	73.95	
26	Heinz Weis	Germany	73.51	73.19	X	73.51	
27	Juan Ignacio Cerra	Argentina	X	72.86	X	72.86	
28	Stuart Rendell	Australia	67.67	72.78	X	72.78	
29	András Haklits	Croatia	X	X	72.66	72.66	
30	Libor Charfreitag	Slovakia	71.10	72.52	X	72.52	
31	Karsten Kobs	Germany	72.29	X	71.65	72.29	
32	Miloslav Konopka	Slovakia	70.55	X	X	70.55	
33	Jan Bielecki	Denmark	68.56	70.46	X	70.46	
34	Olli-Pekka Karjalainen	Finland	69.64	X	X	69.64	
35	Markus Esser	Germany	X	69.51	X	69.51	
36	Kevin McMahon	United States	69.48	65.97	X	69.48	
37	Vitor Costa	Portugal	67.07	68.79	68.89	68.89	
38	Primož Kozmus	Slovenia	68.83	X	67.02	68.83	
39	Jud Logan	United States	68.42	68.05	X	68.42	
40	Roman Rozna	Moldova	X	68.01	62.46	68.01	
41	Paddy McGrath	Ireland	67.00	64.09	64.35	67.00	
42	Vitaly Khojatelev	Uzbekistan	60.55	64.53	65.04	65.04	
43	Victor Ustinov	Uzbekistan	X	60.60	X	60.60	
—	Nikolay Davydov	Kyrgyzstan	X	X	X	NM	

=== Final ===
The tie for bronze medal at 79.17 metres was broken by second-best throw, with Astapkovich's 79.06 metres beating Tikhon's 78.85 metres.

Rank	Athlete	Nation	1	2	3	4	5	6	Distance	Notes
1st place, gold medalist(s)	Szymon Ziółkowski	Poland	74.89	79.87	X	80.02	78.68	78.32	80.02	
2nd place, silver medalist(s)	Nicola Vizzoni	Italy	76.35	76.57	79.64	76.07	76.99	X	79.64	PB
3rd place, bronze medalist(s)	Igor Astapkovich	Belarus	74.98	X	77.08	X	79.17	79.06	79.17	
4	Ivan Tikhon	Belarus	78.85	78.11	79.17	X	75.93	X	79.17	
5	Ilya Konovalov	Russia	78.56	78.12	X	X	72.78	X	78.56	
6	Loris Paoluzzi	Italy	78.18	X	X	X	76.19	X	78.18	
7	Tibor Gécsek	Hungary	75.25	76.99	77.70	75.81	77.06	76.82	77.70	
8	Vladimír Maška	Czech Republic	77.32	75.37	76.39	73.86	X	75.52	77.32	
9	Koji Murofushi	Japan	X	76.24	76.60	Did not advance			76.60	
10	Andriy Skvaruk	Ukraine	71.60	75.50	X	Did not advance			75.50	
11	David Chaussinand	France	74.74	X	75.26	Did not advance			75.26	
12	Alexandros Papadimitriou	Greece	X	73.30	X	Did not advance			73.30	

== See also ==
- 2000 Hammer Throw Year Ranking
