= Athletics at the 1999 Summer Universiade – Men's hammer throw =

The men's hammer throw event at the 1999 Summer Universiade was held on 9 and 10 July at the Estadio Son Moix in Palma de Mallorca, Spain.

== Medalists ==
Gold	Silver	Bronze
Zsolt Németh; Hungary	Hristos Polihroniou; Greece	Vladyslav Piskunov; Ukraine

== Results ==
=== Qualification ===
Qualification: 72.00 (Q) or at least 12 best performers (q) advance to the final

Rank	Group	Athlete	Nationality	Results	Notes
1	B	Alexandros Papadimitriou	Greece	76.44	Q
2	B	Zsolt Németh	Hungary	75.44	Q
3	A	Hristos Polihroniou	Greece	73.53	Q
4	B	Nicola Vizzoni	Italy	73.37	Q
5	B	Libor Charfreitag	Slovakia	73.31	Q
6	A	Vadim Khersontsev	Russia	73.12	Q
7	A	Koji Murofushi	Japan	73.00	Q
8	B	Jan Bielecki	Denmark	72.90	Q
9	B	András Haklits	Croatia	72.86	Q
10	B	Artem Rubanko	Ukraine	72.68	Q
11	A	Vítor Costa	Portugal	72.31	Q
12	B	Chris Harmse	South Africa	72.28	Q
13	A	Vladyslav Piskunov	Ukraine	72.10	Q
14	B	Vadim Dzeviatouski	Belarus	70.87	
15	B	Primož Kozmus	Slovenia	70.11	
16	A	Paddy McGrath	Ireland	69.87	
17	A	Jerry Ingalls	United States	68.58	
18	A	Cosmin Sorescu	Romania	68.09	
19	A	Bengt Johansson	Sweden	67.55	
20	B	Adam Connolly	United States	67.02	
21	A	John Stoikos	Canada	66.25	
22	A	Damir Škripec	Slovenia	65.17	
23	A	Yosvany Suárez	Cuba	63.56	
24	B	Eduardo Acuña	Peru	62.85	
25	B	Oğuz Kalkan	Turkey	59.19	
26	B	Hamad Saleh Al-Mahdi	Algeria	58.21	
27	A	Raúl Rivera	Guatemala	54.49	

=== Final ===
Rank	Athlete	Nationality	#1	#2	#3	#4	#5	#6	Result	Notes
1st place, gold medalist(s)	Zsolt Németh	Hungary	x	78.96	80.40	x	x	79.58	80.40	PB
2nd place, silver medalist(s)	Hristos Polihroniou	Greece	x	78.81	77.40	79.83	77.75	x	79.83	PB
3rd place, bronze medalist(s)	Vladyslav Piskunov	Ukraine	76.83	77.79	77.88	78.04	77.55	78.61	78.61	
4	Vadim Khersontsev	Russia							77.87	
5	Nicola Vizzoni	Italy							77.80	
6	Koji Murofushi	Japan							77.14	
7	Alexandros Papadimitriou	Greece							76.66	
8	Libor Charfreitag	Slovakia							75.18	PB
9	Jan Bielecki	Denmark							73.79	
10	András Haklits	Croatia							73.23	
11	Vítor Costa	Portugal							73.23	
12	Artem Rubanko	Ukraine							71.91	
13	Chris Harmse	South Africa							70.18	
