= 1994 European Athletics Championships – Men's hammer throw =

Men's Hammer Throw Event

Men's hammer throw at the European Athletics Championships

These are the official results of the Men's hammer throw event at the 1994 European Championships in Helsinki, Finland, held at Helsinki Olympic Stadium on 10 and 11 August 1994. There were a total number of 25 participating athletes.

== Medalists ==
Gold	Vasiliy Sidorenko; Russia (RUS)
Silver	Igor Astapkovich; Belarus (BLR)
Bronze	Heinz Weis; Germany (GER)

== Abbreviations ==
- All results shown are in metres

Q	automatic qualification
q	qualification by rank
DNS	did not start
NM	no mark
WR	world record
AR	area record
NR	national record
PB	personal best
SB	season best

== Records ==
Standing records prior to the 1994 European Athletics Championships
World Record	Yuriy Sedykh (URS)	86.74 m	August 30, 1986	Stuttgart, West Germany
Event Record	Yuriy Sedykh (URS)	86.74 m	August 30, 1986	Stuttgart, West Germany

== Qualification ==
=== Group A ===
Rank	Overall	Athlete	Attempts			Distance
Rank	Overall	Athlete	1	2	3	Distance
1	1	Heinz Weis (GER)				79.56 m
2	2	Igor Astapkovich (BLR)				79.00 m
3	6	Igor Nikulin (RUS)				75.10 m
4	9	Tibor Gécsek (HUN)				74.74 m
5	12	Oleksandr Krykun (UKR)				74.16 m
6	14	Aleksandr Krasko (BLR)				73.88 m
7	16	Mika Laaksonen (FIN)				72.88 m
8	19	Claus Dethloff (GER)				72.08 m
9	20	Tore Gustafsson (SWE)				71.90 m
10	21	Gilles Dupray (FRA)				71.38 m
11	22	Pavel Sedláček (CZE)				71.36 m
12	24	Jan Bielecki (DEN)				66.72 m
13	25	Loris Paoluzzi (ITA)				66.50 m

=== Group B ===
Rank	Overall	Athlete	Attempts			Distance
Rank	Overall	Athlete	1	2	3	Distance
1	3	Vitaliy Alisevich (BLR)				75.84 m
2	4	Christophe Épalle (FRA)				75.44 m
3	5	Vasiliy Sidorenko (RUS)				75.42 m
4	7	Balázs Kiss (HUN)				74.84 m
5	8	Karsten Kobs (GER)				74.76 m
6	10	Andriy Skvaruk (UKR)				74.70 m
7	11	Vadim Kolesnik (UKR)				74.28 m
8	13	Marko Wahlman (FIN)				73.96 m
9	15	Frédéric Kuhn (FRA)				73.30 m
10	17	Zoltán Fábián (HUN)				72.80 m
11	18	Per Karlsson (SWE)				72.56 m
12	23	Jüri Tamm (EST)				68.46 m

== Final ==
Rank	Athlete	Attempts						Distance	Note
Rank	Athlete	1	2	3	4	5	6	Distance	Note
1st place, gold medalist(s)	Vasiliy Sidorenko (RUS)	79.54	X	81.10	80.26	79.54	80.90	81.10 m	
2nd place, silver medalist(s)	Igor Astapkovich (BLR)	79.54	80.40	78.64	78.46	X	79.88	80.40 m	
3rd place, bronze medalist(s)	Heinz Weis (GER)	X	78.10	77.18	78.48	X	75.94	78.48 m	
4	Igor Nikulin (RUS)							78.38 m	
5	Tibor Gécsek (HUN)							77.62 m	
6	Oleksandr Krykun (UKR)							76.08 m	
7	Christophe Épalle (FRA)							75.22 m	
8	Vadim Kolesnik (UKR)							75.22 m	
9	Vitaliy Alisevich (BLR)							74.44 m	
10	Karsten Kobs (GER)							74.40 m	
11	Andrey Skvaruk (UKR)							74.22 m	
12	Balázs Kiss (HUN)							73.08 m	

== Participation ==
According to an unofficial count, 25 athletes from 12 countries participated in the event.

- Belarus (3)
- Czech Republic (1)
- Denmark (1)
- Estonia (1)
- Finland (2)
- France (3)
- Germany (3)
- Hungary (3)
- Italy (1)
- Russia (2)
- Sweden (2)
- Ukraine (3)

== See also ==
- 1992 Men's Olympic Hammer Throw (Barcelona)
- 1993 Men's World Championships Hammer Throw (Stuttgart)
- 1994 Hammer Throw Year Ranking
- 1995 Men's World Championships Hammer Throw (Gothenburg)
- 1996 Men's Olympic Hammer Throw (Atlanta)
