= Zoltán Fábián =

Hungarian hammer thrower (born 1969)

Zoltán Fábián (born 22 April 1969) is a male hammer thrower from Hungary. His personal best throw is 78.20 metres, achieved in June 1998 in Budapest.

He competed at the 1994 European Championships and the 1997 World Championships, but without reaching the final. He never became national champion; the competition from Tibor Gécsek, Balázs Kiss, Adrián Annus and Zsolt Németh was too strong, but he did win a bronze medal in 1994.

Continuing as a Masters athlete, he won the M45 division at the 2015 World Masters Athletics Championships.

== Achievements ==
Year	Competition	Venue	Position	Notes
Representing Hungary
1994	European Championships	Helsinki, Finland	17th	72.80 m
1995	World Championships	Gothenburg, Sweden	24th	71.06 m
1997	World Championships	Athens, Greece	24th	72.12 m
