= Athletics at the 1996 Summer Olympics – Men's hammer throw =

Men's hammer throw at the Games of the XXVI Olympiad
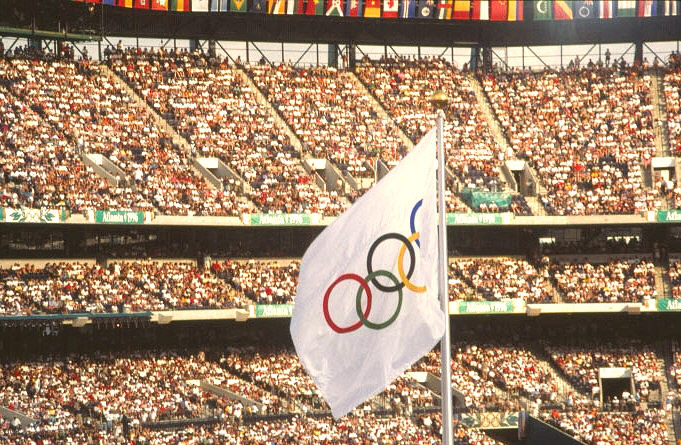
- Olympic flag at the Centennial Olympic Stadium
- Venue: Centennial Olympic Stadium
- Dates: 27 July 1996 (qualifying); 28 July 1996 (final)
- Competitors: 37 from 22 nations
- Winning distance: 81.24

Medalists
1st place, gold medalist(s)		Balázs Kiss; Hungary
2nd place, silver medalist(s)		Lance Deal; United States
3rd place, bronze medalist(s)		Oleksandr Krykun; Ukraine

The men's hammer throw was an event at the 1996 Summer Olympics in Atlanta, Georgia. There were 37 competitors from 22 nations, with twelve athletes reaching the final. The maximum number of athletes per nation had been set at 3 since the 1930 Olympic Congress. The eight highest-ranked competitors after three rounds qualified for the final three throws to decide the medals. The qualification mark was set at 76.50 metres. The event was won by Balázs Kiss of Hungary, the nation's first victory in the men's hammer throw since 1968 and fourth overall (third-most behind the United States's seven and the Soviet Union's six). Lance Deal earned the United States' first medal in the event since 1956 with his silver. Oleksandr Krykun's bronze gave Ukraine a medal in its debut as an independent nation.

== Background ==
This was the 22nd appearance of the event, which has been held at every Summer Olympics except 1896. Seven of the 12 finalists from the 1992 Games returned: silver medalist Igor Astapkovich of the Unified Team (now competing for Belarus), fifth-place finisher (and 1980 and 1988 bronze medalist) Jüri Tamm of Estonia, sixth-place finisher (and 1988 finalist) Heinz Weis of Germany, seventh-place finisher Lance Deal of the United States, eighth-place finisher Sean Carlin of Australia, tenth-place finisher Christophe Epalle of France, and eleventh-place finisher Enrico Sgrulletti of Italy. Reigning Olympic champion and two-time reigning (1993 and 1995) world champion Andrey Abduvaliyev of Tajikistan did not compete. Astapkovich had been runner-up to Abduvaliyev at both world championships as well as the 1992 Games.

Belarus, the Czech Republic, Russia, Ukraine, and Uzbekistan (the latter three having formerly competed as part of the Soviet Union and Unified Team) each made their debut in the event. The United States appeared for the 21st time, most of any nation, having missed only the boycotted 1980 Games.

== Competition format ==
The competition used the two-round format introduced in 1936, with the qualifying round completely separate from the divided final. In qualifying, each athlete received three attempts; those recording a mark of at least 76.50 metres advanced to the final. If fewer than 12 athletes achieved that distance, the top 12 would advance. The results of the qualifying round were then ignored. Finalists received three throws each, with the top eight competitors receiving an additional three attempts. The best distance among those six throws counted.

== Records ==
Prior to the competition, the existing world and Olympic records were as follows.

World record	Yuriy Sedykh (URS)	86.74	Stuttgart, West Germany	30 August 1986
Olympic record	Sergey Litvinov (URS)	84.80	Seoul, South Korea	26 September 1988

No new world or Olympic records were set during the competition.

== Schedule ==
All times are Eastern Daylight Time (UTC-4)

Date	Time	Round
Saturday, 27 July 1996	11:30	Qualifying
Sunday, 28 July 1996	15:45	Final

== Results ==
=== Qualifying ===
Rank	Athlete	Nation	1	2	3	Distance	Notes
1	Lance Deal	United States	75.10	76.34	78.56	78.56	Q
2	Igor Astapkovich	Belarus	76.00	78.52	—	78.52	Q
3	Balázs Kiss	Hungary	X	78.34	—	78.34	Q
4	Heinz Weis	Germany	75.16	77.84	—	77.84	Q
5	Szymon Ziółkowski	Poland	77.64	—	—	77.64	Q
6	Andriy Skvaruk	Ukraine	73.52	77.48	—	77.48	Q
7	Enrico Sgrulletti	Italy	77.36	—	—	77.36	Q
8	Vasiliy Sidorenko	Russia	76.64	—	—	76.64	Q
9	Raphaël Piolanti	France	75.46	X	76.44	76.44	q
10	Oleksandr Krykun	Ukraine	73.82	75.78	75.70	75.78	q
11	Ilya Konovalov	Russia	74.84	75.10	75.08	75.10	q
12	Sergey Alay	Belarus	74.94	73.60	75.10	75.10	q
13	Alberto Sánchez	Cuba	73.16	74.22	74.82	74.82	
14	Claus Dethloff	Germany	74.60	73.68	72.68	74.60	
15	Vadim Khersontsev	Russia	73.62	74.00	74.48	74.48	
16	Alexandros Papadimitriou	Greece	74.42	X	74.46	74.46	
17	Christophe Épalle	France	74.22	73.42	73.98	74.22	
18	Karsten Kobs	Germany	72.04	X	74.20	74.20	
19	Gilles Dupray	France	X	70.92	74.04	74.04	
20	Pavel Sedláček	Czech Republic	72.60	73.98	X	73.98	
21	Aleksandr Krasko	Belarus	71.82	73.74	X	73.74	
22	Zsolt Németh	Hungary	41.64	72.24	73.68	73.68	
23	Marko Wahlman	Finland	72.60	73.50	X	73.50	
24	Kevin McMahon	United States	73.10	73.46	72.78	73.46	
25	Sean Carlin	Australia	73.32	72.00	X	73.32	
26	Jüri Tamm	Estonia	72.14	73.16	X	73.16	
27	Loris Paoluzzi	Italy	71.38	71.68	72.82	72.82	
28	Adrián Annus	Hungary	68.68	72.26	72.58	72.58	
29	Ken Popejoy	United States	72.08	72.46	X	72.46	
30	Tore Gustafsson	Sweden	70.36	71.02	X	71.02	
31	Jan Bielecki	Denmark	X	X	69.40	69.40	
32	David Smith	Great Britain	X	X	69.32	69.32	
33	Roman Linscheid	Ireland	X	68.14	66.90	68.14	
34	Aqarab Abbas	Pakistan	65.60	X	64.34	65.60	
35	Andrés Charadia	Argentina	65.26	X	X	65.26	
36	Vitaliy Khozhatelev	Uzbekistan	64.52	X	X	64.52	
—	Hristos Polyhroniou	Greece	X	X	X	NM	

=== Final ===
Deal fouled his first two throws; his third equaled the eighth longest throw of the competition. However, he was only in ninth place, because the other competitor had a second legal throw. The announcer initially stated that, on the basis of that tiebreaker, Deal was out of the rest of the competition. The officials corrected the error, however; IAAF rules do not call for breaking ties in this case. So Deal advanced, and on his sixth and final throw, won the silver medal behind Balázs Kiss.

Rank	Athlete	Nation	1	2	3	4	5	6	Distance
1st place, gold medalist(s)	Balázs Kiss	Hungary	79.28	80.50	81.24	78.60	79.82	X	81.24
2nd place, silver medalist(s)	Lance Deal	United States	X	X	76.94	75.62	77.26	81.12	81.12
3rd place, bronze medalist(s)	Oleksandr Krykun	Ukraine	76.24	77.64	79.44	X	78.14	80.02	80.02
4	Andriy Skvaruk	Ukraine	74.24	X	79.92	75.80	76.56	X	79.92
5	Heinz Weis	Germany	78.78	79.30	X	78.10	78.98	79.78	79.78
6	Ilya Konovalov	Russia	76.44	77.48	77.44	77.70	76.52	78.72	78.72
7	Igor Astapkovich	Belarus	76.38	78.20	X	76.62	77.38	X	78.20
8	Sergey Alay	Belarus	75.46	76.68	77.38	76.50	76.38	75.78	77.38
9	Enrico Sgrulletti	Italy	76.34	76.94	75.22	76.88	74.78	76.98	76.98
10	Szymon Ziółkowski	Poland	76.30	74.90	76.64	Did not advance			76.64
11	Raphaël Piolanti	France	74.34	75.24	X	Did not advance			75.24
12	Vasiliy Sidorenko	Russia	73.62	X	74.68	Did not advance			74.68

== See also ==
- 1996 Hammer Throw Year Ranking
