= Jan Bielecki =

Jan Bielecki may refer to:

- Jan Krzysztof Bielecki (born 1951), Polish politician and economist
- Jan Bielecki (athlete) (born 1971), Danish athlete
