= M40 at the 2012 European Masters Athletics Championships =

The eighteenth European Masters Athletics Championships were held in Zittau, Germany, Zgorzelec, Poland and Hrádek nad Nisou, Czech Republic, from August 16-25, 2012. The European Masters Athletics Championships serve the division of the sport of athletics for people over 35 years of age, referred to as masters athletics.

The championships were held in three locations near the German/Czech/Polish border.

Less countries participated compared with the last championships in Nyiregyhaza, but just over 700 more athletes participated, giving it the third greatest attendance of any championship run by European Masters Athletics ever.

== Results ==
=== 100 metres ===
Pos	Athlete	Country	Results
1st place, gold medalist(s)	Mattias Sunneborn	Sweden	11.07
2nd place, silver medalist(s)	Mark Dunwell	Great Britain	11.16
3rd place, bronze medalist(s)	Andrea Benatti	Italy	11.21

=== 200 metres ===
Pos	Athlete	Country	Results
1st place, gold medalist(s)	Andrea Benatti	Italy	22.43
2nd place, silver medalist(s)	Jim Tipper	Great Britain	22.59
3rd place, bronze medalist(s)	Will Macgee	Great Britain	22.92

=== 400 metres ===
Pos	Athlete	Country	Results
1st place, gold medalist(s)	Michael Gardiner	Great Britain	49.82
2nd place, silver medalist(s)	Andreas Schulze	Germany	50.40
3rd place, bronze medalist(s)	Massimiliano Poeta	Italy	50.72

=== 800 metres ===
Pos	Athlete	Country	Results
1st place, gold medalist(s)	Frederic Desmedt	Belgium	2:02.50
2nd place, silver medalist(s)	Juan Hernandez	Spain	2:02.50
3rd place, bronze medalist(s)	Joaquin Rosello	Spain	2:04.29

=== 1500 metres ===
Pos	Athlete	Country	Results
1st place, gold medalist(s)	Julio Bardavio Atienza	Spain	4:21.33
2nd place, silver medalist(s)	German Hehn	Germany	4:21.80
3rd place, bronze medalist(s)	Ugo Piccioli Cappelli	Italy	4:23.76

=== 5000 metres ===
Pos	Athlete	Country	Results
1st place, gold medalist(s)	David Morwood	Great Britain	15:29.88
2nd place, silver medalist(s)	Panajot Papandreopoulos	Greece	15:33.79
3rd place, bronze medalist(s)	Michel Ribeiro	France	15:49.27

=== 10000 metres ===
Pos	Athlete	Country	Results
1st place, gold medalist(s)	Luis del Aguila	Spain	31:45.60
2nd place, silver medalist(s)	Bernard te Boekhorst	Netherlands	32:36.76
3rd place, bronze medalist(s)	Miguel an Gil Rodriguez	Spain	32:39.95

=== 110 metres hurdles ===
Pos	Athlete	Country	Results
1st place, gold medalist(s)	Joe Appiah	Great Britain	14.86
2nd place, silver medalist(s)	Peter Zillig	Switzerland	15.58
3rd place, bronze medalist(s)	Tomas Petricek	Czech Republic	15.62

=== 400 metres hurdles ===
Pos	Athlete	Country	Results
1st place, gold medalist(s)	Andreas Schulze	Germany	56.31
2nd place, silver medalist(s)	Darko Juricic	Croatia	56.85
3rd place, bronze medalist(s)	Neal Edwards	Great Britain	58.24

=== 3000 metres steeplechase ===
Pos	Athlete	Country	Results
1st place, gold medalist(s)	Walter de Laurentiis	Italy	10:26.28
2nd place, silver medalist(s)	Jan Cihlar	Czech Republic	10:28.06
3rd place, bronze medalist(s)	Katerin Stoilov	Bulgaria	10:29.88

=== 4×100 metres relay ===
Pos	Athletes	Country	Results
1st place, gold medalist(s)	Paolo Chiapperini	Italy	43.78
1st place, gold medalist(s)	Massimiliano Poeta	Italy	43.78
1st place, gold medalist(s)	Emiliano Raspi	Italy	43.78
1st place, gold medalist(s)	Andrea Benatti	Italy	43.78
2nd place, silver medalist(s)	Stefan Rackwitz	Germany	44.25
2nd place, silver medalist(s)	Bernd Schauwecker	Germany	44.25
2nd place, silver medalist(s)	Harald Koehler	Germany	44.25
2nd place, silver medalist(s)	Andreas Schulze	Germany	44.25
3rd place, bronze medalist(s)	Dalton Powell	Great Britain	44.26
3rd place, bronze medalist(s)	Will Macgee	Great Britain	44.26
3rd place, bronze medalist(s)	Joe Appiah	Great Britain	44.26
3rd place, bronze medalist(s)	Jim Tipper	Great Britain	44.26

=== 4×400 metres relay ===
Pos	Athletes	Country	Results
1st place, gold medalist(s)	Kolja Ewert	Germany	3:27.23
1st place, gold medalist(s)	Bernd Schauwecker	Germany	3:27.23
1st place, gold medalist(s)	Bernd Lachmann	Germany	3:27.23
1st place, gold medalist(s)	Andreas Schulze	Germany	3:27.23
2nd place, silver medalist(s)	Massimiliano Poeta	Italy	3:36.81
2nd place, silver medalist(s)	Ugo Piccioli Cappelli	Italy	3:36.81
2nd place, silver medalist(s)	Moreno Mandich	Italy	3:36.81
2nd place, silver medalist(s)	Emiliano Raspi	Italy	3:36.81
3rd place, bronze medalist(s)	Radoslaw Stepniak	Poland	3:44.19
3rd place, bronze medalist(s)	Andrzej Fras	Poland	3:44.19
3rd place, bronze medalist(s)	Jerzy Krauze	Poland	3:44.19
3rd place, bronze medalist(s)	Andrzej Nowacki	Poland	3:44.19

=== Marathon ===
Pos	Athlete	Country	Results
1st place, gold medalist(s)	Muharrem Yilmaz	Turkey	2:39:20
2nd place, silver medalist(s)	Zoltan Sebestyen	Hungary	2:43:48
3rd place, bronze medalist(s)	Stefan Hauptmann	Germany	2:47:09

=== High jump ===
Pos	Athlete	Country	Results
1st place, gold medalist(s)	Mikhail Mekhonoshin	Russia	1.83
2nd place, silver medalist(s)	Igor Svintsov	Russia	1.80
3rd place, bronze medalist(s)	Mariusz Dziuba	Poland	1.75

=== Pole vault ===
Pos	Athlete	Country	Results
1st place, gold medalist(s)	Lars Funke	Germany	4.40
2nd place, silver medalist(s)	Piotr Nawocki	Poland	4.30
3rd place, bronze medalist(s)	Petr Julis	Czech Republic	4.00

=== Long jump ===
Pos	Athlete	Country	Results
1st place, gold medalist(s)	Mattias Sunneborn	Sweden	7.18
2nd place, silver medalist(s)	Stanislav Lepik	Russia	6.47
3rd place, bronze medalist(s)	Josue Mbon	Switzerland	6.39

=== Triple jump ===
Pos	Athlete	Country	Results
1st place, gold medalist(s)	Petr Remes	Czech Republic	13.80
2nd place, silver medalist(s)	Stanislav Lepik	Russia	13.64
3rd place, bronze medalist(s)	Keith Newton	Great Britain	13.14

=== Shot put ===
Pos	Athlete	Country	Results
1st place, gold medalist(s)	Tilman Northoff	Germany	16.56
2nd place, silver medalist(s)	Gintas Degutis	Lithuania	16.22
3rd place, bronze medalist(s)	Oliver Rohwer	Germany	15.93

=== Discus throw ===
Pos	Athlete	Country	Results
1st place, gold medalist(s)	Szabolcs Bognar	Hungary	49.32
2nd place, silver medalist(s)	Tilman Northoff	Germany	46.32
3rd place, bronze medalist(s)	Aitor Olaizola	Spain	45.00

=== Hammer throw ===
Pos	Athlete	Country	Results
1st place, gold medalist(s)	Zoltan Fabian	Hungary	66.03
2nd place, silver medalist(s)	Mariusz Walczak	Poland	57.53
3rd place, bronze medalist(s)	Michael Hofer	Austria	55.12

=== Javelin throw ===
Pos	Athlete	Country	Results
1st place, gold medalist(s)	Birger Voigt	Germany	50.52
2nd place, silver medalist(s)	Allan K. Nielsen	Denmark	45.89
3rd place, bronze medalist(s)	Jose Dominguez	Spain	45.16

=== Weight throw ===
Pos	Athlete	Country	Results
1st place, gold medalist(s)	Mariusz Walczak	Poland	18.54
2nd place, silver medalist(s)	Pavel Penaz	Czech Republic	16.37
3rd place, bronze medalist(s)	Antonios Kontos	Germany	15.47

=== Throws pentathlon ===
Pos	Athlete	Country	Results
1st place, gold medalist(s)	Pavel Penaz	Czech Republic	3713
2nd place, silver medalist(s)	Grzegorz Pawelski	Poland	3685
3rd place, bronze medalist(s)	Jozko Pirnat	Slovenia	2925

=== Decathlon ===
Pos	Athlete	Country	Results
1st place, gold medalist(s)	Heiko Illig	Germany	6295
2nd place, silver medalist(s)	Stephan Andres	Germany	6091
3rd place, bronze medalist(s)	Jiri Horak	Czech Republic	5904

=== 5000 metre track race walk ===
Pos	Athlete	Country	Results
1st place, gold medalist(s)	Emmanuel Boulay	France	22:19.47
2nd place, silver medalist(s)	Normunds Ivzans	Latvia	22:53.50
3rd place, bronze medalist(s)	Viacheslav Degtyarenko	Russia	23:26.35

=== 20000 metre road race walk ===
Pos	Athlete	Country	Results
1st place, gold medalist(s)	Andrei Pupyshev	Russia	1:38:21
2nd place, silver medalist(s)	Viacheslav Degtyarenko	Russia	1:39:27
3rd place, bronze medalist(s)	Normunds Ivzans	Latvia	1:44:20
