= Christophe Épalle =

French hammer thrower (born 1969)

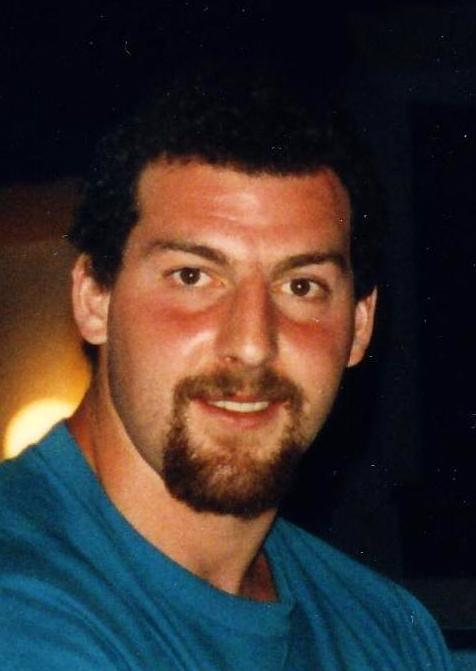
- Christophe Épalle in 1993

Personal information
- Born: 23 January 1969 (age 57) Saint-Etienne, France

Sport
- Sport: Track and field
Medal record
Representing France
Summer Universiade
Bronze medal – third place	1993 Buffalo	Hammer throw
Mediterranean Games
Gold medal – first place	1997 Bari	Hammer throw

Christophe Épalle (born 23 January 1969) is a French hammer thrower, whose personal best throw is 81.79 metres, achieved in June 2000 in Clermont-Ferrand.

Competing for the SMU Mustangs track and field team, Épalle was the 1991 NCAA Division I champion in the hammer throw and weight throw.

== Achievements ==
Year	Competition	Venue	Position	Notes
Representing France
1988	World Junior Championships	Sudbury, Canada	8th	62.14 m
1991	Universiade	Sheffield, United Kingdom	5th	73.52 m
1992	Olympic Games	Barcelona, Spain	10th	74.84 m
1993	Universiade	Buffalo, United States	3rd	76.80 m
1993	World Championships	Stuttgart, Germany	8th	76.22 m
1994	European Championships	Helsinki, Finland	7th	75.22 m
1995	World Championships	Gothenburg, Sweden	15th (q)	73.62 m
1996	Olympic Games	Atlanta, United States	17th (q)	74.22 m
1997	Mediterranean Games	Bari, Italy	1st	78.44 m
1997	World Championships	Paris, France	–	NM
1998	European Championships	Budapest, Hungary	12th	74.00 m
2000	Olympic Games	Sydney, Australia	23rd (q)	74.22 m
2002	European Championships	Munich, Germany	21st (q)	76.27 m
2003	World Championships	Paris, France	23rd (q)	72.82 m
2005	Jeux de la Francophonie	Niamey, Niger	2nd	71.41 m
2006	European Championships	Gothenburg, Sweden	20th (q)	69.12 m
2006	World Cup	Athens, Greece	9th	71.43 m
