= Enrico Sgrulletti =

Italian hammer thrower (born 1965)

Personal information
- Nationality: Italian
- Born: April 24, 1965 (age 61) Rome, Italy
- Height: 1.81 m (5 ft 11 in)
- Weight: 110 kg (243 lb)

Sport
- Country: Italy
- Sport: Athletics
- Event: Hammer throw
- Club: G.S. Fiamme Gialle

Achievements and titles
- Personal best: Hammer throw: 81.64 m (1997)
Medal record
Mediterranean Games
Silver medal – second place	1991 Athens	Hammer throw
Bronze medal – third place	1997 Bari	Hammer throw

Enrico Sgrulletti (born 24 April 1965 in Rome) is a retired male hammer thrower from Italy, whose personal best throw is 81.64 metres, achieved in March 1997 in Ostia.

== Biography ==
He won two medals, at senior level, at the International athletics competitions.

== Achievements ==
Year	Competition	Venue	Position	Notes
1990	European Championships	Split, Yugoslavia	7th	75.82 m
1991	Mediterranean Games	Athens, Greece	2nd	74.78 m
1991	World Championships	Tokyo, Japan	16th	72.40 m
1992	Olympic Games	Barcelona, Spain	11th	72.98 m
1993	World Championships	Stuttgart, Germany	27th	63.58 m
1995	World Championships	Gothenburg, Sweden	18th	72.60 m
1996	Olympic Games	Atlanta, United States	9th	76.98 m
1997	Mediterranean Games	Bari, Italy	3rd	76.32 m
1997	World Championships	Athens, Greece	16th	74.70 m
1998	European Championships	Budapest, Hungary	16th	74.91 m

== See also ==
- Italian records in athletics
- Italian all-time top lists - Hammer throw
