= Szymon Ziółkowski =

Polish hammer thrower and politician

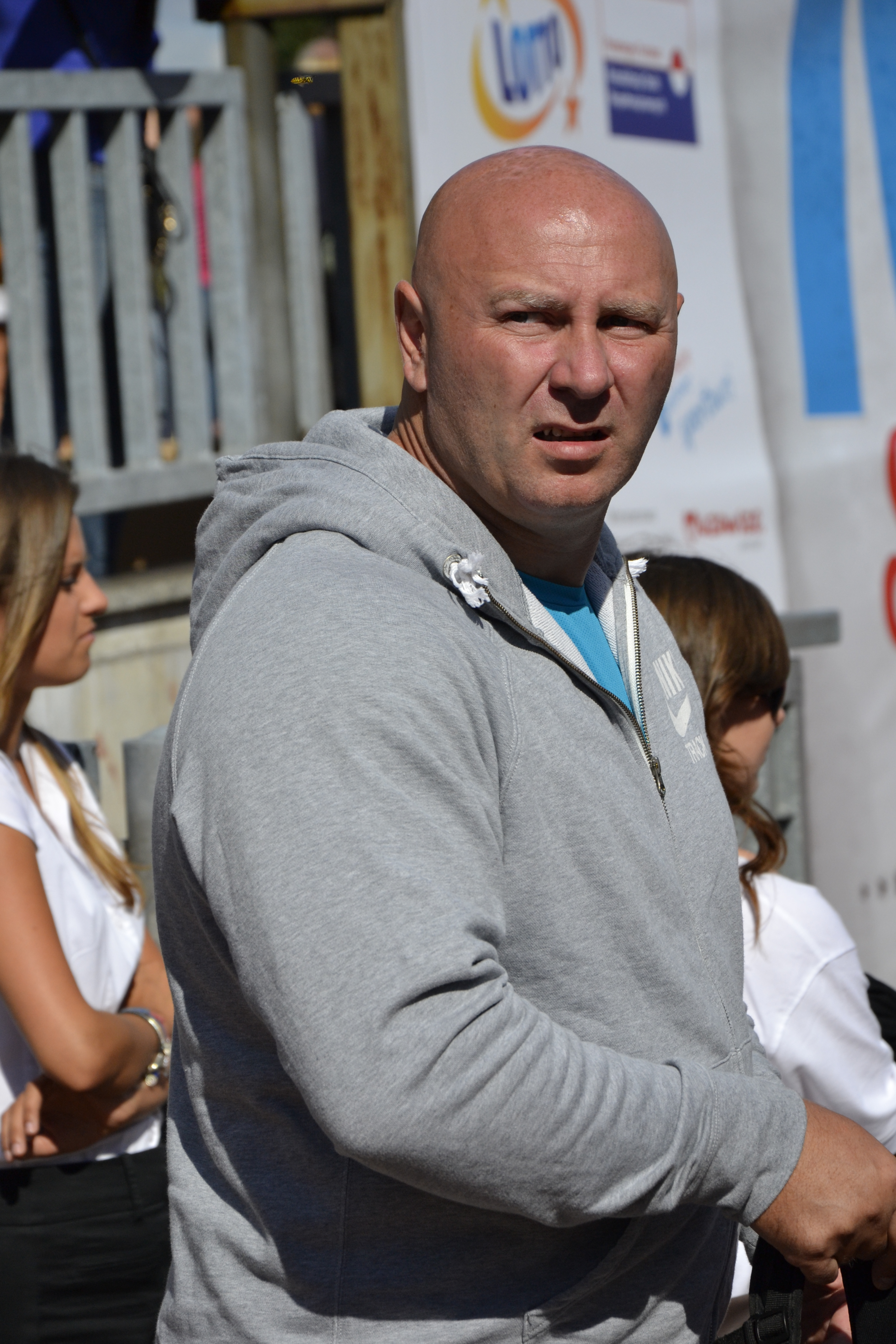
- Szymon Ziółkowski in 2013.

Personal information
- Nationality: Poland
- Born: 1 July 1976 (age 50) Poznań, Poland
- Height: 1.92 m (6 ft 3 1/2 in)
- Weight: 120 kg (265 lb) (2012)

Sport
- Sport: Athletics
- Event: Hammer throw
- Club: AZS AWF Poznan
Medal record
Men's athletics
Representing Poland
Olympic Games
Gold medal – first place	2000 Sydney	Hammer throw
World Championships
Gold medal – first place	2001 Edmonton	Hammer throw
Silver medal – second place	2005 Helsinki	Hammer throw
Silver medal – second place	2009 Berlin	Hammer throw
European Championships
Bronze medal – third place	2012 Helsinki	Hammer throw
European Team Championships
Silver medal – second place	2009 Leiria	Hammer throw
European Cup Winter Throwing
Gold medal – first place	2006 Tel Aviv	Hammer throw

Szymon Jerzy Ziółkowski (pronounced [ˈʂɨmɔn ʑuwˈkɔfskʲi]; born 1 July 1976 in Poznań) is a retired Polish hammer thrower and politician.

An Olympic gold medal winner from Sydney 2000, he also won a gold medal at the 2001 World Championships in Edmonton with a career best throw of 83.38 metres, and two silvers at the 2005 and 2009 editions in Helsinki and Berlin respectively.

After retiring from athletics he became a politician.

== Career ==
Before winning the 2000 Olympic gold medal he had won the gold medal at the 1994 World Junior Championships, finished tenth at the 1996 Olympic Games and fifth at the 1998 European Championships and competed at the 1995 and 1999 World Championships without reaching the final.

After the 2001 season three low-key seasons followed. He competed at the 2004 Olympic Games without reaching the final.

After the 2005 World Championships, he finished fifth at the 2006 European Championships, seventh at the 2007 World Championships and fifth at the 2008 Olympic Games. At the World Athletics Final he finished fifth in 2005, seventh in 2006 and eighth in 2007. In 2009 World Championships in Athletics in Berlin he won silver medal with the result of 79.30m finishing 50 cm behind the Olympic champion of Beijing Primož Kozmus.

As of 2015, he is a member of the Sejm.

== National honours ==
For his sport achievements, he received:
Knight's Cross of the Order of Polonia Restituta (5th Class) in 2000.
Officer's Cross of the Order of Polonia Restituta (4th Class) in 2009.

== Competition record ==
Year	Competition	Venue	Position	Notes
Representing Poland
1994	World Junior Championships	Lisbon, Portugal	1st	70.44 m
1995	European Junior Championships	Nyíregyháza, Hungary	1st	75.42 m
1995	World Championships	Gothenburg, Sweden	22nd (q)	71.84 m
1995	Universiade	Fukuoka, Japan	9th	72.94 m
1996	Olympic Games	Atlanta, United States	10th	76.64 m
1997	European U23 Championships	Turku, Finland	2nd	73.68 m
1998	European Championships	Budapest, Hungary	5th	78.16 m
1999	World Championships	Seville, Spain	23rd (q)	74.12 m
2000	Olympic Games	Sydney, Australia	1st	80.02 m
2001	World Championships	Edmonton, Canada	1st	83.38 m (CR, NR)
2001	Goodwill Games	Brisbane, Australia	2nd	80.71 m
2002	European Championships	Munich, Germany	15th (q)	77.17 m
2004	Olympic Games	Athens, Greece	14th (q)	76.17 m
2005	World Championships	Helsinki, Finland	2nd	79.35 m
2006	European Championships	Gothenburg, Sweden	5th	78.97 m
2007	World Championships	Osaka, Japan	7th	80.09 m
2008	Olympic Games	Beijing, China	7th	79.22 m
2009	World Championships	Berlin, Germany	2nd	79.30 m
2010	European Championships	Barcelona, Spain	5th	77.99 m
2011	World Championships	Daegu, South Korea	7th	77.64 m
2012	European Championships	Helsinki, Finland	3rd	76.67 m
2012	Olympic Games	London, United Kingdom	7th	77.10 m
2013	World Championships	Moscow, Russia	9th	76.84 m
2014	European Championships	Zürich, Switzerland	5th	78.41 m
