= Vítor Costa (hammer thrower) =

Portuguese hammer thrower (born 1974)

Personal information
- Born: 28 May 1974 (age 52) Braga, Portugal

Sport
- Sport: Track and field

Vítor Afonso Rodrigues da Costa (born 28 May 1974) is a Portuguese hammer thrower. His personal best is 76.86 metres, achieved in July 2004 in Reims.

He finished ninth at the 1992 World Junior Championships. On senior level he competed at the World Championships in 1997 and 1999 as well as the Olympic Games in 2000 and 2004 without reaching the final.

== Achievements ==
Year	Competition	Venue	Position	Notes
Representing Portugal
1992	World Junior Championships	Seoul, South Korea	9th	64.00 m
1993	European Junior Championships	San Sebastián, Spain	12th	52.36 m
1995	Universiade	Fukuoka, Japan	17th	65.68 m
1996	Ibero-American Championships	Medellín, Colombia	3rd	69.84 m
1997	Universiade	Catania, Italy	–	NM
1997	World Championships	Athens, Greece	35th (q)	70.04 m
1998	Ibero-American Championships	Lisbon, Portugal	2nd	71.17 m
1998	European Championships	Budapest, Hungary	28th (q)	72.28 m
1999	Universiade	Palma de Mallorca, Spain	11th	73.23 m
1999	World Championships	Seville, Spain	33rd (q)	69.28 m
2000	Ibero-American Championships	Rio de Janeiro, Brazil	2nd	72.36 m
2000	Olympic Games	Sydney, Australia	37th (q)	68.89 m
2002	European Championships	Munich, Germany	26th (q)	72.43 m
2004	Olympic Games	Athens, Greece	27th (q)	72.47 m
