= Vitaliy Khozhatelev =

Uzbekistani hammer thrower (born 1967)

Personal information
- Born: 12 August 1967 (age 59)
Medal record
Men's athletics
Representing Uzbekistan
Asian Championships
Bronze medal – third place	1995 Jakarta	Hammer throw

Vitaliy Khozhatelev (Russian: Виталий Хожателев; born 12 August 1967) is a retired Uzbekistani hammer thrower.

He won the bronze medal at the 1995 Asian Championships, and finished fourth at the 1998 Asian Games. He competed at the 1995 World Championships, the 1996 Olympic Games and the 2000 Olympic Games without reaching the final.

His personal best throw was 75.62 metres, achieved in June 2000 in Tashkent.
