= Gilles Dupray =

French hammer thrower

Personal information
- Born: 2 January 1970 (age 56) Lannion, France
- Height: 1.86 m (6 ft 1 in)
- Weight: 115 kg (254 lb)

Sport
- Sport: Track and field
- Event: Hammer throw
- Club: Trégor Goëlo Athlétisme

Gilles Dupray (born 2 January 1970) is a retired French athlete who specialised in the hammer throw. He represented his country at the 1996 and 2000 Summer Olympics as well as two World Championships without qualifying for the final. In addition he won the gold medal at the 1994 Jeux de la Francophonie.

His personal best in the event is 82.38 metres set in Chelles in 2000. This is the still standing national record.

== Competition record ==
Year	Competition	Venue	Position	Notes
Representing France
1993	Universiade	Buffalo, United States	8th	70.98 m
1994	Jeux de la Francophonie	Paris, France	1st	74.94 m
1994	European Championships	Helsinki, Finland	21st (q)	71.38 m
1995	World Championships	Gothenburg, Sweden	26th (q)	70.46 m
1995	Universiade	Fukuoka, Japan	12th	70.96 m
1996	Olympic Games	Atlanta, United States	19th (q)	74.04 m
1998	European Championships	Budapest, Hungary	21st (q)	73.92 m
1999	World Championships	Seville, Spain	25th (q)	73.32 m
2000	Olympic Games	Sydney, Australia	19th (q)	75.05 m
