= Sergey Alay =

Belarusian hammer thrower

Sergey Petrovich Alay (Belarusian: Сяргей Пегрович Алай; 11 June 1965 – October 2021) was a Belarusian hammer thrower, whose personal best throw is 82.00 metres, achieved in May 1992 in Stayki.

== Achievements ==
Year	Competition	Venue	Position	Notes
Representing Belarus
1993	World Championships	Stuttgart, Germany	4th	79.02 m
1995	World Championships	Gothenburg, Sweden	6th	76.66 m
1996	Summer Olympics	Atlanta, United States	8th	77.38 m
