= Balázs Kiss (hammer thrower) =

Hungarian hammer thrower

Personal information
- Nationality: Hungarian
- Born: 21 March 1972 (age 54) Veszprém, Hungary
- Height: 1.88 m (6 ft 2 in)
- Weight: 115 kg (254 lb)

Sport
- Country: Hungary
- Sport: Athletics
- Event: Hammer throw

Achievements and titles
- Personal best: 83.00 m (1998)
Medal record
Men's athletics
Representing Hungary
Olympic Games
| Gold medal – first place | 1996 Atlanta | Hammer throw |
European Championships
| Silver medal – second place | 1998 Budapest | Hammer throw |
Universiade
| Gold medal – first place | 1995 Fukuoka | Hammer throw |
| Gold medal – first place | 1997 Catania | Hammer throw |
| Silver medal – second place | 1993 Buffalo | Hammer throw |

Balázs Kiss (Hungarian pronunciation: [ˈbɒlaːʒ ˈkiʃ]; born 21 March 1972) is a retired Hungarian hammer thrower. He is the 1996 Olympic champion and the 1998 European Championships silver medalist, and has two fourth places from World Championships. His personal best throw was 83.00 metres, achieved during the 1998 Golden League circuit.

== Early career ==
Kiss was born in Veszprém. As a junior athlete he won the bronze medal at the 1991 European Junior Championships, with a throw of 68.40 metres. The same year he had thrown 70.66 metres.

Kiss then enrolled as a student in the United States. He won the 1993 National Collegiate Athletic Association Division I Outdoor Track and Field Championships with a throw of 75.24 metres, and later won three more titles in a row. In 1995 and 1996 he set new championship records with 79.62 metres and 80.86 metres respectively. He represented the University of Southern California (USC) in the U.S. where in 1994 he became the first USC athlete in 26 years to win consecutive titles at the NCAA Track and Field Championships.

== International career ==
Kiss finished twelfth at the 1994 European Championships. In 1995 he broke the 80-metre barrier for the first time, his season's best being 82.56 metres, achieved in Veszprém in August. He participated at the 1995 World Championships, and finished fourth. Kiss was almost two metres short of the bronze medal, which was won by compatriot Tibor Gécsek. However, Kiss won the gold medal at the 1995 Summer Universiade.

In 1996 Kiss won the Olympic gold medal with a throw of 81.24 metres. He also finished fourth at the Grand Prix Final. His season's best throw was 81.76 metres, achieved in July in Nice. In 1997 Kiss competed at the World Championships, but finished fourth for the second time. He did defend his Universiade gold medal, though, winning the 1997 Summer Universiade. Like in 1995, he finished ahead of a Ukrainian and a Russian. His 82.90 metre throw from Veszprém in July was a new personal best. In June 1998 Kiss threw the hammer 83.00 metres in the Meeting Gaz de France Golden League meet. This would be his lifetime best performance. He later won silver medals both at the European Championships, again behind Tibor Gécsek, and the Grand Prix Final.

Participations at the World Championships in 1999 and 2001 followed. In 1999 he failed to reach the final, whereas in 2001 he finished sixth. In 2002 he finished fourth at the European Championships and third at the Grand Prix Final. His best throw between 1999 and 2002 was 81.36 metres, achieved in July 2001 in Cottbus. Kiss became the Hungarian champion in 1995, 1998 and 2000, rivalling with Tibor Gécsek, Adrián Annus and Zsolt Németh.

He announced his retirement in July 2004. He stands 1.88 m (6 ft 2 in) tall, and during his active career he weighed 117 kilograms (258 lb).

Kiss was inducted into the USTFCCCA Collegiate Athlete Hall of Fame in 2024.

== Awards ==
- Hungarian athlete of the Year (3): 1995, 1996, 1997
- Order of Merit of the Republic of Hungary – Officer's Cross (1996)
