= Vasiliy Sidorenko =

Russian hammer thrower

Personal information
- Native name: Василий Викорович Сидоренко
- Full name: Vasiliy Viktorovich Sidorenko
- Nationality: Russian
- Born: May 1, 1961 (age 65) Stalingrad, Soviet Union
- Height: 1.85 m (6 ft 1 in)
- Weight: 109 kg (240 lb)

Sport
- Country: Russia
- Sport: Men's Athletics
- Event: Hammer throw
- Club: Dynamo Volgograd

Achievements and titles
- Personal best: 82.54 m (1992)
Medal record
Men's athletics
Representing Russia
World Championships
Bronze medal – third place	1997 Athens	Hammer
European Championships
Gold medal – first place	1994 Helsinki	Hammer

Vasiliy Viktorovich Sidorenko (Russian: Василий Викорович Сидоренко; born 1 May 1961 in Stalingrad) is a retired male hammer thrower who represented the USSR and later Russia. He is the 1994 European champion and won a bronze medal at the 1997 World Championships. His personal best throw is 82.54 metres, achieved in 1992.

== International competitions ==
Representing Russia
Year	Competition	Venue	Position	Notes
1993	World Championships	Stuttgart, Germany	5th	78.86 m
1994	European Championships	Helsinki, Finland	1st	81.10 m
1994	IAAF Grand Prix Final	Paris, France	3rd	79.12 m
1995	World Championships	Gothenburg, Sweden	23rd	71.78 m
1996	Olympic Games	Atlanta, United States	12th	74.68 m
1997	World Championships	Athens, Greece	3rd	80.76 m
1998	European Championships	Budapest, Hungary	13th	75.56 m
1999	World Championships	Seville, Spain	17th	74.85 m
2000	Olympic Games	Sydney, Australia	21st	74.72 m
2001	World Championships	Edmonton, Canada	21st	74.56 m
