= 1992 World Junior Championships in Athletics – Men's hammer throw =

The men's hammer throw event at the 1992 World Junior Championships in Athletics was held in Seoul, South Korea, at Olympic Stadium on 18 September. A 7257g (senior implement) hammer was used.

== Medalists ==
Gold	Vadym Grabovoyy; Commonwealth of Independent States
Silver	Alberto Sánchez; Cuba
Bronze	Andrey Yevgenyev; Commonwealth of Independent States

== Results ==
=== Final ===
18 September

Rank	Name	Nationality	Attempts						Result	Notes
Rank	Name	Nationality	1	2	3	4	5	6	Result	Notes
1st place, gold medalist(s)	Vadym Grabovoyy	Commonwealth of Independent States	67.40	71.64	67.82	70.58	73.00	70.10	73.00	
2nd place, silver medalist(s)	Alberto Sánchez	Cuba	68.72	x	x	67.56	x	69.78	69.78	
3rd place, bronze medalist(s)	Andrey Yevgenyev	Commonwealth of Independent States	x	69.24	x	68.92	x	x	69.24	
4	David Chaussinand	France	64.04	x	65.74	x	x	68.20	68.20	
5	Nicola Vizzoni	Italy	x	66.96	x	65.56	64.94	66.72	66.96	
6	Aléxandros Papadimitríou	Greece	64.20	65.42	65.16	x	x	66.96	66.96	
7	José Manuel Pérez	Spain	64.14	66.24	65.60	66.60	65.16	66.34	66.60	
8	Koji Murofushi	Japan	62.70	65.78	x	x	x	x	65.78	
9	Vítor Costa	Portugal	x	64.00	x				64.00	
10	Norbert Horváth	Hungary	x	62.48	63.96				63.96	
11	Adrián Annus	Hungary	57.52	63.18	x				63.18	
12	Achim Strohschänk	Germany	59.94	62.82	60.94				62.82	
13	Yosvani Suárez	Cuba	62.06	59.20	59.16				62.06	
14	Loris Paoluzzi	Italy	x	60.44	61.04				61.04	
15	Vladimír Maška	Czechoslovakia	x	57.92	59.48				59.48	
16	Héctor Bontempi	Argentina	59.48	x	57.26				59.48	
17	Ioánnis Bizios	Greece	56.64	x	58.78				58.78	
18	Dirk Tuschmo	Germany	x	x	58.28				58.28	
19	Nasser Al-Jarallah	Kuwait	57.94	x	x				57.94	
20	Matt Dwight	Australia	x	57.52	55.70				57.52	
21	Wu Lianyong	China	56.94	56.42	x				56.94	

== Participation ==
According to an unofficial count, 21 athletes from 15 countries participated in the event.

- Argentina (1)
- Australia (1)
- China (1)
- Commonwealth of Independent States (2)
- Cuba (2)
- Czechoslovakia (1)
- France (1)
- Germany (2)
- Greece (2)
- Hungary (2)
- Italy (2)
- Japan (1)
- Kuwait (1)
- Portugal (1)
- Spain (1)
