= Alberto Sánchez (hammer thrower) =

Cuban hammer thrower

Personal information
- Born: 2 February 1973 (age 53) Santiago de Cuba, Cuba

Sport
- Sport: Track and field
Medal record
Representing Cuba
Pan American Games
Silver medal – second place	1995 Mar del Plata	Hammer throw
Central American and Caribbean Games
Gold medal – first place	1993 Ponce	Hammer throw
Gold medal – first place	1998 Maracaibo	Hammer throw
World Junior Championships
Silver medal – second place	1992 Seoul	Hammer throw

Alberto Sánchez Escobar (born 2 February 1973 in Santiago de Cuba) is a retired Cuban hammer thrower, whose personal best throw is 77.78 metres, which he achieved in May 1998 in Havana. He competed twice at the World Championships without reaching the final; in 1993 and 1995. He competed at the 1996 Summer Olympics.

He competed as a guest athlete in the under-20 section of the Central American and Caribbean Junior Championships in Havana and placed third in 56.40 m, behind the two selected Cuban throwers.

== International competition record ==
Year	Competition	Venue	Position	Notes
Representing Cuba
1991	Pan American Junior Championships	Kingston, Jamaica	1st	63.52 m
1992	World Junior Championships	Seoul, South Korea	2nd	69.78 m
1993	Universiade	Buffalo, United States	7th	72.24 m
1993	Central American and Caribbean Championships	Cali, Colombia	1st	74.98 m
1993	World Championships	Stuttgart, Germany	19th (q)	71.00 m
1993	Central American and Caribbean Games	Ponce, Puerto Rico	1st	72.20 m CR
1995	Pan American Games	Mar del Plata, Argentina	2nd	73.94 m
1995	World Championships	Gothenburg, Sweden	—	NM
1996	Ibero-American Championships	Medellín, Colombia	1st	73.62 m
1996	Olympic Games	Atlanta, United States	13th (q)	74.82 m
1997	Central American and Caribbean Championships	San Juan, Puerto Rico	1st	72.10 m
1998	Ibero-American Championships	Lisbon, Portugal	1st	76.18 m CR
1998	Central American and Caribbean Games	Maracaibo, Venezuela	1st	74.25 m CR
1998	World Cup	Johannesburg, South Africa	4th	73.71 m
2003	Pan American Games	Santo Domingo, Dominican Republic	4th	69.37 m
