= David Smith (hammer thrower, born 1974) =

British hammer thrower (born 1974)

David W Smith
Personal information
- Nationality: British (English)
- Born: 2 November 1974 (age 51) Grimsby, England
- Height: 193 cm (6 ft 4 in)
- Weight: 110 kg (243 lb)

Sport
- Sport: Athletics
- Event: Hammer throw
- Club: City of Hull

David William Smith (born 2 November 1974) is a male retired hammer thrower who competed for Great Britain at the 1996 Summer Olympics.

== Biography ==
Smith, a member of the City of Hull AC, became the British hammer throw champion after winning the British AAA Championships title at the 1996 AAA Championships.

At the 1996 Olympic Games in Atlanta, Smith represented Great Britain in the men's hammer throw event throwning 69.32 metres in the qualifying round.

He represented England in the hammer throw event, at the 1998 Commonwealth Games in Kuala Lumpur, Malaysia.

In 2002 he was ranked as the country's number one, but he retired in 2003.

== Personal life ==
In 2015 Smith was sentenced to two years in prison for a sexual offence.

== International competitions ==
| Year | Competition | Venue | Position | Notes |
Representing Great Britain
| 1996 | Olympic Games | Atlanta, Georgia, United States | 18th | 69.32 m |
| 1997 | World Championships | Athens, Greece | 32nd | 70.94 m |
| 1998 | Commonwealth Games | Kuala Lumpur, Malaysia | 5th | 69.77 m |
