= 1988 World Junior Championships in Athletics – Men's hammer throw =

The men's hammer throw event at the 1988 World Junior Championships in Athletics was held in Sudbury, Ontario, Canada, at Laurentian University Stadium on 29 and 30 July. A 7257g (senior implement) hammer was used.

== Medalists ==
| Gold | Vadim Kolesnik; Soviet Union |
| Silver | Oleg Polyushik; Soviet Union |
| Bronze | Thomas Hommel; East Germany |

== Results ==
=== Final ===
30 July

| Rank | Name | Nationality | Attempts | | | | | | Result | Notes |
| Rank | Name | Nationality | 1 | 2 | 3 | 4 | 5 | 6 | Result | Notes |
|---|---|---|---|---|---|---|---|---|---|---|
| 1st place, gold medalist(s) | Vadim Kolesnik | Soviet Union | 69.52 | 68.54 | 68.80 | 67.24 | 66.26 | 67.44 | 69.52 | |
| 2nd place, silver medalist(s) | Oleg Polyushik | Soviet Union | 69.00 | x | x | x | x | x | 69.00 | |
| 3rd place, bronze medalist(s) | Thomas Hommel | East Germany | 65.44 | 62.98 | 62.88 | 64.34 | 64.04 | 66.06 | 66.06 | |
| 4 | Stefan Fischer | West Germany | 64.48 | 64.02 | 64.58 | 64.04 | 65.48 | x | 65.48 | |
| 5 | László Redei | Hungary | 62.88 | 63.70 | 62.74 | 65.08 | 64.78 | 61.86 | 65.08 | |
| 6 | János Verebes | Hungary | 64.78 | 64.34 | x | x | 63.56 | x | 64.78 | |
| 7 | Gareth Cook | United Kingdom | 59.46 | 61.84 | 62.40 | 60.06 | x | 62.58 | 62.58 | |
| 8 | Christoph Épalle | France | x | 62.14 | x | 61.94 | x | 62.04 | 62.14 | |
| 9 | Eleodor Rosca | Romania | x | x | 61.86 | | | | 61.86 | |
| 10 | Alex Marfull | Spain | 59.46 | 61.00 | 59.54 | | | | 61.00 | |
| 11 | Marko Wahlman | Finland | x | 58.58 | 60.20 | | | | 60.20 | |
| | Emilio Calabrò | Italy | x | x | x | | | | NM | |

=== Qualifications ===
29 Jul

==== Group A ====
| Rank | Name | Nationality | Attempts | | | Result | Notes |
| Rank | Name | Nationality | 1 | 2 | 3 | Result | Notes |
|---|---|---|---|---|---|---|---|
| 1 | Vadim Kolesnik | Soviet Union | 67.62 | - | - | 67.62 | Q |
| 2 | Oleg Polyushik | Soviet Union | 65.50 | - | - | 65.50 | Q |
| 3 | László Redei | Hungary | 64.76 | - | - | 64.76 | Q |
| 4 | János Verebes | Hungary | 64.08 | - | - | 64.08 | Q |
| 5 | Stefan Fischer | West Germany | 63.76 | - | - | 63.76 | Q |
| 6 | Christoph Épalle | France | x | 63.26 | - | 63.26 | Q |
| 7 | Emilio Calabrò | Italy | 62.96 | - | - | 62.96 | Q |
| 7 | Eleodor Rosca | Romania | 62.96 | - | - | 62.96 | Q |
| 9 | Thomas Hommel | East Germany | 62.28 | - | - | 62.28 | Q |
| 10 | Gareth Cook | United Kingdom | 59.92 | 60.60 | 62.12 | 62.12 | Q |
| 11 | Marko Wahlman | Finland | 62.04 | - | - | 62.04 | Q |
| 12 | Alex Marfull | Spain | 57.94 | 61.46 | - | 61.46 | Q |
| 13 | Steve Dering | United States | x | x | 60.66 | 60.66 | |
| 14 | Juha Paasonen | Finland | 58.02 | 58.18 | 59.44 | 59.44 | |
| 15 | Scott Bucyk | Canada | 55.24 | 54.68 | 54.92 | 55.24 | |
| | Sherif El-Hennawi | Egypt | x | x | x | NM | |

== Participation ==
According to an unofficial count, 16 athletes from 13 countries participated in the event.

- Canada (1)
- East Germany (1)
- Egypt (1)
- Finland (2)
- France (1)
- Hungary (2)
- Italy (1)
- Romania (1)
- Soviet Union (2)
- Spain (1)
- United Kingdom (1)
- United States (1)
- West Germany (1)
