= Ken Popejoy =

American hammer thrower (born 1972)

Personal information
- Born: 15 February 1972 (age 54) New York City, United States

Sport
- Sport: Track and field

David Kenneth Popejoy (born 15 February 1972) is a retired American hammer thrower.

Popejoy was an All-American thrower for the Stanford Cardinal track and field team, finishing 5th in the hammer throw at the 1995 NCAA Division I Outdoor Track and Field Championships.

He competed at the 1996 Olympic Games and the 1997 World Championships without reaching the final. He competed alongside his closest friend Kevin McMahon, who competed in both the 1996 Olympics and the 2000 Olympic Games.

His personal best throw was 74.26 metres, achieved in June 1996 in Atlanta.
