= Aleksandr Seleznyov =

Russian hammer thrower (1964–2024)

Personal information
- Born: 25 January 1964 Smolensk, Soviet Union
- Died: 12 February 2024 (aged 60) Smolensk, Russia

Sport
- Sport: Track and field

Aleksandr Ivanovich Seleznyov (Russian: Александр Иванович Селезнёв; 25 January 1964 – 12 February 2024) was a Russian hammer thrower. His personal best throw was 81.70 metres, achieved in May 1993 in Sochi.

Seleznyov was the trainer for Olga Kuzenkova, the first woman to throw the hammer more than 70 metres.

Aleksandr Seleznyov died on 12 February 2024, at the age of 60.

== Achievements ==
Year	Competition	Venue	Position	Notes
Representing Soviet Union
1983	European Junior Championships	Schwechat, Austria	2nd	
1991	Universiade	Sheffield, England	4th	
Representing Russia
1993	World Championships	Stuttgart, Germany	6th	78.58 m
1995	World Championships	Gothenburg, Sweden	8th	76.18 m
1995	Military World Games	Rome, Italy	1st	77.72 m
