= Karsten Kobs =

German hammer thrower (born 1971)

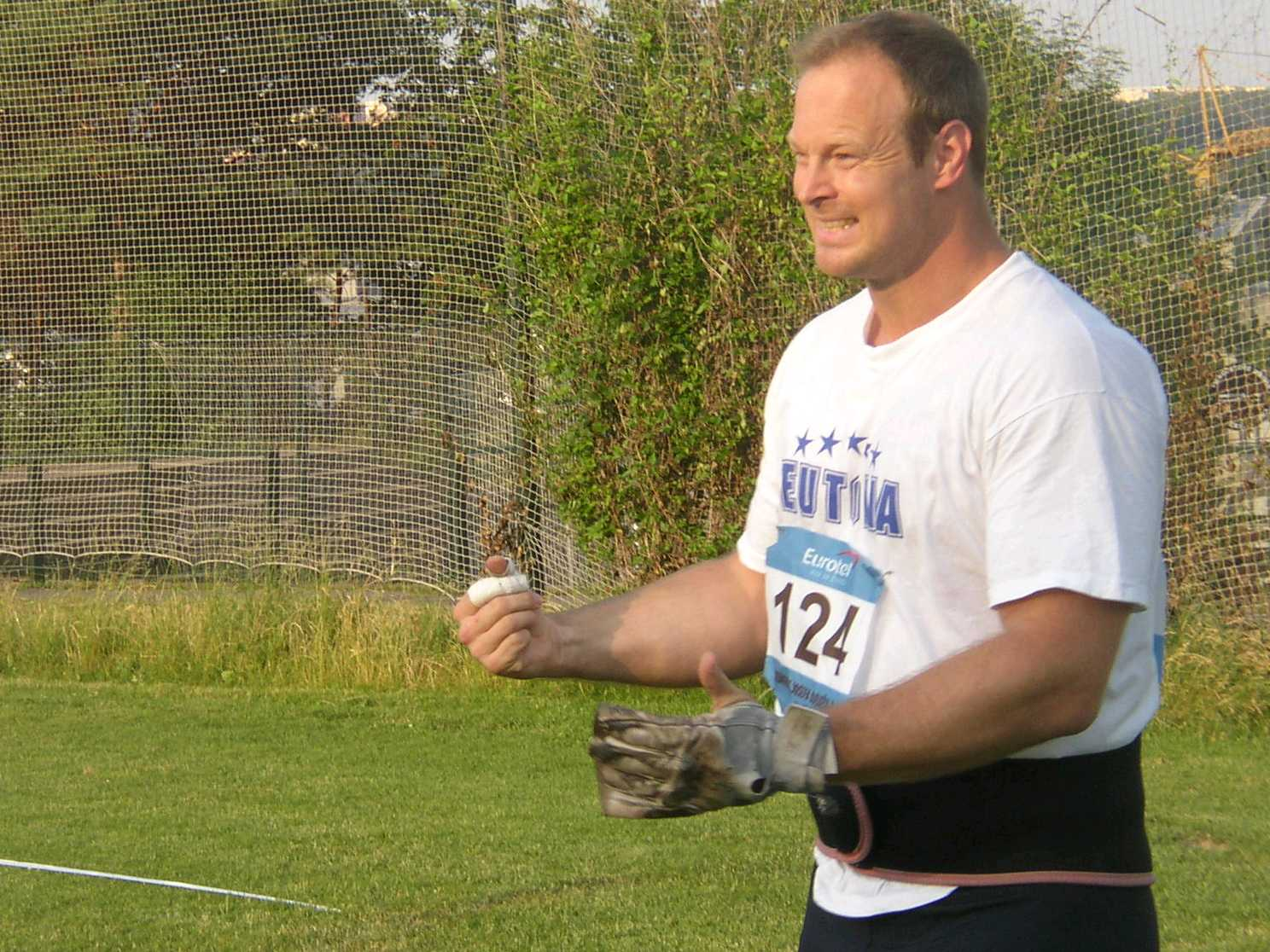
- Kobs at Josef Odložil Memorial, Prague, 2005

Personal information
- Born: 16 September 1971 (age 54) Dortmund, North Rhine-Westphalia, West Germany
- Years active: 1989–2008
- Height: 1.95 m (6 ft 5 in)
- Weight: 127 kg (280 lb)

Sport
- Sport: Men's Athletics
- Event: Men's Hammer throw
- Club: Bayer Leverkusen

Achievements and titles
- Personal best: 82.78 m (1999)
Medal record
Men's athletics
Representing Germany
World Championships
Gold medal – first place	1999 Seville	Hammer
European Championships
Bronze medal – third place	1998 Budapest	Hammer

Karsten Kobs (born 16 September 1971 in Dortmund) is a German hammer thrower, whose personal best throw is 82.78 metres, achieved in June 1999 in Dortmund. This ranks him third among German hammer throwers, only behind Ralf Haber and Heinz Weis.

== International competitions ==
Year	Competition	Venue	Position	Notes
Representing West Germany
1989	European Junior Championships	Varaždin, SFR Yugoslavia	10th	62.02 m
1990	World Junior Championships	Plovdiv, Bulgaria	4th	67.66 m
Representing Germany
1993	World Championships	Stuttgart, Germany	16th	71.82 m
1994	European Championships	Helsinki, Finland	10th	74.40 m
1995	World Student Games	Fukuoka, Japan	7th	73.32 m
1995	World Championships	Gothenburg, Sweden	16th	72.96 m
1996	Olympic Games	Atlanta, Georgia, United States	18th	74.20 m
1997	World Championships	Athens, Greece	9th	76.12 m
1998	European Championships	Budapest, Hungary	3rd	80.13 m
1999	World Championships	Seville, Spain	1st	80.24 m
2000	Olympic Games	Sydney, Australia	31st	72.29 m
2000	IAAF Grand Prix Final	Doha, Qatar	3rd	79.22 m
2001	World Championships	Edmonton, Canada	—	DNS
2002	European Championships	Munich, Germany	14th	77.44 m
2002	World Cup	Madrid, Spain	3rd	78.44 m
2003	World Championships	Paris, France	17th	75.55 m
2003	World Athletics Final	Szombathely, Hungary	8th	74.18 m
2004	Olympic Games	Athens, Greece	8th	76.30 m
2004	World Athletics Final	Szombathely, Hungary	7th	75.26 m
2006	European Championships	Gothenburg, Sweden	8th	77.93 m
