= Vadym Hrabovoyy =

Ukrainian hammer thrower

Personal information
- Born: April 5, 1973 (age 53)

Sport
- Sport: Track and field
Medal record
Representing Commonwealth of Independent States
World Junior Championships
Gold medal – first place	1992 Seoul	Hammer throw

Vadym Hrabovoyy (born April 5, 1973) is a retired male hammer thrower from Ukraine. He set his personal best (79.82 metres) on May 15, 2002 at a meet in Bila Tserkva.

== Achievements ==
Year	Competition	Venue	Position	Notes
Representing Soviet Union
1991	European Junior Championships	Thessaloniki, Greece	4th	67.92 m
Representing the Commonwealth of Independent States
1992	World Junior Championships	Seoul, South Korea	1st	73.00 m
Representing Ukraine
1995	Military World Games	Rome, Italy	2nd	75.46 m
