= Tibor Gécsek =

Hungarian hammer thrower

Personal information
- Nationality: Hungary
- Born: 22 September 1964 (age 61) Szentgotthárd, Hungary
- Height: 1.85 m (6 ft 1 in)
- Weight: 107 kg (236 lb)

Sport
- Country: Hungary
- Sport: Men's Athletics
- Event: Hammer throw

Achievements and titles
- Personal best: 83.68 m (1998)
Medal record
Men's athletics
Representing Hungary
World Championships
Bronze medal – third place	1993 Stuttgart	Hammer
Bronze medal – third place	1995 Gothenburg	Hammer
European Championships
Gold medal – first place	1998 Budapest	Hammer
Silver medal – second place	1990 Split	Hammer

Tibor Gécsek (born 22 September 1964 in Szentgotthárd) is a retired male hammer thrower from Hungary. Gécsek is of Hungarian Slovenian descent.

He won two consecutive World Championships bronze medals in 1993 and 1995. Later that year he received a four-year ban by the IAAF for a positive drugs test. The next year, however, IAAF shortened the maximum ban to two years. Gécsek was therefore reinstated after two years. His personal best throw was 81.68 metres, achieved in September 1988 in Szombathely, until he threw 82.87 metres to win the 1998 European Championships. This achievement earned him the title 1998 Hungarian Sportsman of the Year. Later that year he threw 83.68 metres in Zalaegerszeg to record his ultimate career best.

Gécsek was elected vice president of the Hungarian Athletic Federation on 10 November 2002.

== International competitions ==
Representing Hungary
Year	Competition	Venue	Position	Notes
1987	World Championships	Rome, Italy	7th	77.56 m
1988	Olympic Games	Seoul, South Korea	6th	78.36 m
1990	European Championships	Split, Yugoslavia	2nd	80.14 m
1991	World Championships	Tokyo, Japan	4th	78.98 m
1992	Olympic Games	Barcelona, Spain	4th	77.78 m
1992	IAAF World Cup	Havana, Cuba	1st	80.44 m
1993	World Championships	Stuttgart, Germany	3rd	79.54 m
1994	European Championships	Helsinki, Finland	5th	77.62 m
1995	World Championships	Gothenburg, Sweden	3rd	80.98 m
1998	European Championships	Budapest, Hungary	1st	82.87 m
1999	World Championships	Seville, Spain	4th	78.95 m
2000	Olympic Games	Sydney, Australia	7th	77.70 m
2002	European Championships	Munich, Germany	6th	79.25 m

== Awards ==
- Hungarian Athlete of the Year (5): 1988, 1992, 1993, 1998, 2000

== See also ==
- List of doping cases in athletics

Awards
Preceded by Botond Storcz	Hungarian Sportsman of The Year; 1998	Succeeded by Gábor Balogh
