= Pavel Sedláček (hammer thrower) =

Czech hammer thrower

Pavel Sedláček (born 5 April 1968 in Moravská Třebová) is a Czech retired hammer thrower, who competed at three consecutive Summer Olympics, starting in 1992 (Barcelona, Spain). He set his personal best (79.56 metres) on 8 September 1996 at a meet in Prague.

== Achievements ==
Year	Competition	Venue	Position	Notes
Representing Czechoslovakia
1992	Olympic Games	Barcelona, Spain	24th	67.76 m
Representing Czech Republic
1993	World Championships	Stuttgart, Germany	13th	73.90 m
1994	European Championships	Helsinki, Finland	22nd	71.36 m
1995	World Championships	Gothenburg, Sweden	33rd	67.94 m
1996	Olympic Games	Atlanta, United States	20th	73.98 m
1997	World Championships	Athens, Greece	18th	73.94 m
1998	European Championships	Budapest, Hungary	25th	72.68 m
1999	World Championships	Seville, Spain	28th	72.63 m
2000	Olympic Games	Sydney, Australia	18th	75.33 m
