= Igor Astapkovich =

Belarusian hammer thrower

Personal information
- Native name: Ігар Вячаслававіч Астапковіч
- Full name: Igor Vyacheslavovich Astapkovich
- Nationality: Belarusian
- Born: 4 January 1963 (age 63) Navapolatsk, Byelorussian SSR, Soviet Union
- Height: 1.92 m (6 ft 4 in)
- Weight: 120 kg (265 lb)
- Spouse: Iryna Yatchenko

Sport
- Country: Soviet Union (1986-1991); Unified Team (1992); Belarus (1993-2004)
- Sport: Athletics
- Event: Hammer throw

Achievements and titles
- Personal best: 84.62 m (1992)
Medal record
Men's athletics
Representing the Soviet Union
World Championships
Silver medal – second place	1991 Tokyo	Hammer
European Championships
Gold medal – first place	1990 Split	Hammer
Universiade
Gold medal – first place	1987 Zagreb	Hammer throw
Gold medal – first place	1989 Duisburg	Hammer throw
Representing Unified Team
Olympic Games
Silver medal – second place	1992 Barcelona	Hammer
Representing Belarus
Bronze medal – third place	2000 Sydney	Hammer
Representing Belarus
World Championships
Silver medal – second place	1993 Stuttgart	Hammer
Silver medal – second place	1995 Gothenburg	Hammer
European Championships
Silver medal – second place	1994 Helsinki	Hammer

Ihar Astapkovich (also Igor Vyacheslavovich Astapkovich, Belarusian: Ігар Вячаслававіч Астапковіч; born 4 January 1963, in Navapolatsk) is a hammer thrower who won two Olympic medals, first representing the Soviet Union and later his home country of Belarus.

He won silver medals at three consecutive World Championships, and became the 1990 European champion. His personal best throw of 84.62 metres, achieved in 1992, puts him 6th on the all-time performers' list.

Astapkovich is married to Iryna Yatchenko, herself a Belarusian Olympic medalist, in discus thrower.

== International competitions ==
Year	Competition	Venue	Position	Notes
Representing the Soviet Union
1987	World Student Games	Zagreb, Yugoslavia	1st	78.46 m
1989	World Student Games	Duisburg, Germany	1st	80.56 m
1990	Goodwill Games	Seattle, United States	1st	84.12 m
1990	European Championships	Split, Yugoslavia	1st	84.14 m
1991	World Championships	Tokyo, Japan	2nd	80.94 m
Representing Unified Team
1992	Olympic Games	Barcelona, Spain	2nd	81.96 m
Representing Belarus
1993	World Championships	Stuttgart, Germany	2nd	79.88 m
1994	European Championships	Helsinki, Finland	2nd	80.40 m
1995	World Championships	Gothenburg, Sweden	2nd	81.10 m
1996	Olympic Games	Atlanta, United States	7th	78.20 m
1996	IAAF Grand Prix Final	Milan, Italy	2nd	79.84 m
1997	World Student Games	Catania, Italy	7th	73.80 m
1997	World Championships	Athens, Greece	5th	79.70 m
1998	European Championships	Budapest, Hungary	7th	77.81 m
1998	IAAF Grand Prix Final	Budapest, Hungary	4th	78.02 m
1999	World Championships	Seville, Spain	9th	76.02 m
2000	Olympic Games	Sydney, Australia	3rd	79.17 m
2001	Goodwill Games	Brisbane, Australia	6th	74.85 m
2001	World Championships	Edmonton, Canada	7th	79.72 m
2002	IAAF Grand Prix Final	Paris, France	5th	78.40 m
2003	World Championships	Paris, France	—	NM
2004	Olympic Games	Athens, Greece	9th	76.22 m
