= Andriy Skvaruk =

Ukrainian hammer thrower

Personal information
- Native name: Андрій богданович Скварук
- Full name: Andriy Bohdanovych Skvaruk
- Nationality: Ukrainian
- Born: 9 March 1967 (age 59) Brodivsky, Soviet Union
- Height: 1.86 m (6 ft 1 in)
- Weight: 106 kg (234 lb)

Sport
- Country: Ukraine
- Sport: Athletics
- Event: Hammer throw
- Club: Rovno ZS

Achievements and titles
- Personal best: 82.62 m (2002)
Medal record
Men's Athletics
Representing Ukraine
World Championships
Silver medal – second place	1997 Athens	Hammer throw
European Cup
Bronze medal – third place	1993 Rome	Hammer throw
Military World Games
Gold medal – first place	1999 Zagreb	Hammer throw

Andriy Bohdanovych Skvaruk (Ukrainian: Андрій Богданович Скварук; born 9 March 1967 in Brodivsky, Lviv) is a retired hammer thrower from Ukraine, with a personal best of 82.62 m (271.1 ft), achieved in April 2002 in Koncha-Zaspa.

== Achievements ==
Year	Competition	Venue	Position	Notes
Representing Ukraine
1993	World Championships	Stuttgart, Germany	—	NM
1994	European Championships	Helsinki, Finland	11th	74.22 m
1996	Olympic Games	Atlanta, United States	4th	79.92 m
1997	World Championships	Athens, Greece	2nd	81.46 m
1998	European Championships	Budapest, Hungary	14th	75.56 m
1999	World Championships	Seville, Spain	5th	78.80 m
1999	World Military Games	Zagreb, Croatia	1st	79.76 m
2000	Olympic Games	Sydney, Australia	10th	75.50 m
2000	IAAF Grand Prix Final	Doha, Qatar	1st	81.43 m
2001	World Championships	Edmonton, Canada	5th	79.93 m
2002	European Championships	Munich, Germany	5th	80.15 m
2003	World Championships	Paris, France	4th	79.68 m
2003	World Athletics Final	Szombathely, Hungary	5th	78.76 m
2005	World Championships	Helsinki, Finland	9th	76.01 m
2006	European Championships	Gothenburg, Sweden	—	NM
