= Vadim Kolesnik =

Ukrainian hammer thrower

Personal information
- Born: 29 April 1969 (age 57)

Sport
- Sport: Track and field
Medal record
Representing Ukraine
Summer Universiade
Gold medal – first place	1993 Buffalo	Hammer throw
Silver medal – second place	1997 Catania	Hammer throw

Vadim Kolesnik (born 29 April 1969) is a retired Ukrainian hammer thrower. His personal best throw is 79.62 metres, achieved in July 1994 in Dnipropetrovsk.

== Achievements ==
Year	Competition	Venue	Position	Notes
Representing the Soviet Union
1988	World Junior Championships	Sudbury, Canada	1st	69.52 m
Representing Ukraine
1993	World Championships	Stuttgart, Germany	11th	73.08 m
1993	Summer Universiade	Buffalo, United States	1st	77.00 m
1994	European Championships	Helsinki, Finland	8th	75.22 m
1995	World Championships	Gothenburg, Sweden	11th	75.18 m
1997	Summer Universiade	Catania, Italy	2nd	77.16 m
1997	World Championships	Athens, Greece	14th	75.16 m
1999	World Championships	Seville, Spain	35th	68.14 m
