= Ilya Konovalov (hammer thrower) =

Russian hammer thrower

Personal information
- Native name: Илья Валерьевич Коновалов
- Full name: Ilya Valeryevich Konovalov
- Nationality: Russian
- Born: March 4, 1971 (age 55) Yefrosimovka, Soviet Union
- Height: 1.92 m (6 ft 4 in)
- Weight: 119 kg (262 lb)

Sport
- Country: Russia
- Sport: Men's Athletics
- Event: Hammer throw
- Club: Dynamo Kursk

Achievements and titles
- Personal best: 82.28 m (2000)
Medal record
World Championships
Bronze medal – third place	2001 Edmonton	Hammer throw
Summer Universiade
Bronze medal – third place	1997 Catania	Hammer throw

Ilya Valeryevich Konovalov (Russian: Илья Валерьевич Коновалов; born 4 March 1971 in Yefrosimovka, Kursk) is a retired male hammer thrower from Russia, whose personal best throw is 82.28 metres, achieved in August 2003 in Tula.

In 2007, Konovalov was found guilty of acetazolamide doping. The sample was delivered on 17 December 2006 in an in-competition test in Kursk, Russia. He received a suspension from February 2007 to February 2009.

== International competitions ==
Year	Competition	Venue	Position	Notes
Representing Russia
1993	Universiade	Buffalo, United States	5th	73.52 m
1995	World Championships	Gothenburg, Sweden	7th	76.50 m
1996	Olympic Games	Atlanta, United States	6th	78.72 m
1997	World Championships	Athens, Greece	6th	78.68 m
1997	Universiade	Catania, Italy	3rd	76.16 m
1998	European Championships	Budapest, Hungary	9th	
1998	Goodwill Games	Uniondale, United States	3rd	
1999	World Championships	Seville, Spain	10th	75.63 m
2000	Olympic Games	Sydney, Australia	5th	
2001	World Championships	Edmonton, Canada	3rd	
2002	European Championships	Munich, Germany	20th	76.79 m
2003	World Military Games	Catania, Italy	3rd	72.86 m
2003	World Championships	Paris, France	6th	
2003	World Athletics Final	Szombathely, Hungary	7th	
2004	Olympic Games	Athens, Greece	12th (q)	76.36 m
2004	World Athletics Final	Szombathely, Hungary	8th	
2005	World Championships	Helsinki, Finland	5th	
2005	World Athletics Final	Szombathely, Hungary	8th	
2006	World Cup	Athens, Greece	3rd	77.14 m

Note: At the 2004 Athens Olympics, Konovalov failed to reach the final. He originally finished 14th in the qualifying round but was promoted to 12th after two of the finalists were disqualified for failing drug tests.

== See also ==
- List of doping cases in athletics
