= Kevin McMahon (hammer thrower) =

American hammer thrower

Personal information
- Born: May 26, 1972 (age 54) San Jose, California, United States

Sport
- Sport: Track and field
Medal record
Representing United States
Pan American Games
Silver medal – second place	1999 Winnipeg	Hammer throw

Kevin McMahon (born May 26, 1972) is a retired track and field athlete from the United States, who competed in the hammer throw. He is also a successful designer and the founder of the Design Dojo educational organization.

In 1987, McMahon was introduced to the hammer throw by 3-time Olympian and 1984 US Olympic Team Flagbearer, Ed Burke. In 1990, he was the #1 ranked US high school hammer thrower, leading the nation with a mark of 66.80m. As a junior athlete (under 20), McMahon broke the USA Jr. National Record in 1991 in Spokane, WA while competing on the USA Junior National Track and Field Team.

As a collegiate athlete, McMahon compete for Georgetown University from 1991-1995 where he was coached by 7x World Record Holder and 1956 Olympic Gold Medalist, Hal Connolly. McMahon finished his collegiate career as a 6-time NCAA All-American (3x Indoors, 3x Outdoors). At the NCAA Outdoor Championships, McMahon finished in 2nd in 1992 and 3rd in 1995. McMahon graduated with honors in 1994 with BA degrees in English and Fine Arts. At graduation, McMahon was named the Robert A. Duffy Scholar-Athlete of the Year. He later also earned an MA in Liberal Studies from Georgetown. In 2015, McMahon was inducted into the Georgetown University Hall of Fame. His best collegiate marks in the hammer throw of 74.70m remains the record for both Georgetown University and the Big East Conference.

As a senior athlete, McMahon finished in the top 3 at the USA Track and Field National Championships 11 times (1993-2002, 2008). He was the USA National Champion in the hammer throw in 1997 and 2001. McMahon represented Team USA on 16 occasions including the 1996 and 2000 Summer Olympics, the 1995, 1997, 1999, and 2001 World Athletic Championships, and the 1999 Pan American Games where McMahon earned a silver medal.

After his athletic career, McMahon found equal success as a creative professional. His portfolio includes a wide range of work (logos, fonts, motion graphics, illustration) for a broad range of companies, most notably for Adobe - serving as the lead artist on for Adobe Character Animator, Adobe Express, and Project Primrose.) His collection of animated GIFs has reached nearly 1 billion views.

As a design educator, McMahon has been a member of the Faculty of Fine Arts at his alma mater Bellarmine College Preparatory since 1998 . In 2010, McMahon founded the Design Dojo, and educational resource serving over 2000 design teachers worldwide with unique education videos, design challenges, and other learning resources. His YouTube videos have reached over 1 million views.

McMahon is also a member of Art of the Olympians (AOTO)

== Achievements ==
Year	Competition	Venue	Position	Notes
Representing the United States
1991	Pan American Junior Championships	Kingston, Jamaica	3rd	59.48 m
1995	World Championships	Gothenburg, Sweden	28th	69.14 m
1996	Olympic Games	Atlanta, Georgia, United States	24th	73.46 m
1997	World Championships	Athens, Greece	23rd	72.42 m
1999	Pan American Games	Winnipeg, Manitoba, Canada	2nd	73.41 m
1999	World Championships	Seville, Spain	19th	74.62 m
2000	Olympic Games	Sydney, Australia	36th	69.48 m
2001	World Championships	Edmonton, Alberta, Canada	17th	75.62 m
