= Loris Paoluzzi =

Italian hammer thrower (born 1974)

Personal information
- Nationality: Italian
- Born: 14 March 1974 (age 52) Gorizia

Sport
- Country: Italy
- Sport: Athletics
- Event: Hammer throw
- Club: G.S. Fiamme Azzurre

Achievements and titles
- Personal best: Hammer throw: 80.98 m (1999)

Loris Paoluzzi (born 14 March 1974) is an Italian retired male hammer thrower, which participated at the 1999 and 2001 World Championships in Athletics.

== Biography ==
His personal best throw was 80.98 metres, achieved in July 1999 in Pescara.

== Achievements ==
Year	Competition	Venue	Position	Notes
1992	World Junior Championships	Seoul, South Korea	14th	61.04 m
1993	European Junior Championships	San Sebastian, Spain	6th	64.02 m
1994	European Championships	Helsinki, Finland	25th (q)	66.50 m
1996	Olympic Games	Atlanta, Georgia, United States	27th	72.82 m
1997	World Championships	Athens, Greece	30th	71.50 m
1998	European Championships	Budapest, Hungary	15th	75.00 m
1999	World Championships	Seville, Spain	21st	74.26 m
2000	Olympic Games	Sydney, Australia	6th	78.18 m
2001	World Championships	Edmonton, Alberta, Canada	20th	74.75 m

== See also ==
- Italian all-time top lists - Hammer throw
