= Sean Carlin =

Australian hammer thrower

Personal information
- Nationality: Australian
- Born: 29 November 1967 (age 58) Adelaide, Australia
- Height: 198 cm (6 ft 6 in)
- Weight: 110 kg (243 lb)

Sport
- Sport: Athletics
- Event: Hammer throw
- Club: Salisbury AC
Medal record
Athletics
Representing Australia
Commonwealth Games
Gold medal – first place	1990 Auckland	Hammer throw
Gold medal – first place	1994 Victoria	Hammer throw

Sean William Carlin (born 29 November 1967) is a retired hammer thrower from Adelaide, Australia, who represented his country in two consecutive Summer Olympics, starting in 1992. He won two gold medals at the Commonwealth Games in 1990 and 1994. Currently Carlin works with Athletics Australia and is employed as a teacher at a prominent private school in South Australia, and is co-host of Carlo & Laid's Sports Show Podcast produced by the Gawler Community Broadcasting Association Inc. He was inducted into the South Australian Athletics Hall of Fame in 2005. He also holds a record for the furthest tuna toss in the Tunarama Festival, in Port Lincoln.

Carlin was a three-times winner of the British AAA Championships title at the 1991 AAA Championships,1992 AAA Championships and 1995 AAA Championships.

== Achievements ==
Year	Competition	Venue	Position	Notes
Representing Australia
1986	World Junior Championships	Athens, Greece	7th	66.48 m
1990	Commonwealth Games	Auckland, New Zealand	1st	75.66 m
1991	Summer Universiade	Sheffield, United Kingdom	11th	66.54 m
1991	World Championships	Tokyo, Japan	9th	73.24 m
1992	Olympic Games	Barcelona, Spain	8th	76.12 m
1994	Commonwealth Games	Victoria, British Columbia	1st	73.48 m
1995	World Championships	Gothenburg, Sweden	14th	73.86 m
1996	Olympic Games	Atlanta, United States	25th	73.32 m
