= Hristos Polihroniou =

Greek hammer thrower (born 1972)

Personal information
- Born: April 9, 1972 (age 54) Athens, Greece

Sport
- Sport: Track and field
Medal record
Representing Greece
Summer Universiade
Silver medal – second place	1999 Palma de Mallorca	Hammer throw

Hristos Polihroniou (also Christos Polychroniou, Greek: Χρήστος Πολυχρονίου, born April 9, 1972) is a retired Greek hammer thrower.

His personal best throw is 80.08 metres, achieved in April 2002 in Athens. This ranks him second among Greek hammer throwers, only behind Alexandros Papadimitriou.

== Doping ==
He was suspended by the IAAF from May 2005 to May 2007, after he'd tested positive for clomiphene. In 2008 he was found guilty of refusal to submit to doping control, and received a life ban.

== Honours ==
Year	Competition	Venue	Position	Notes
Representing Greece
1990	World Junior Championships	Plovdiv, Bulgaria	9th	61.42 m
1991	European Junior Championships	Thessaloniki, Greece	5th	
1995	World Championships	Gothenburg, Sweden	—	NM
1996	Olympic Games	Atlanta, Georgia, United States	—	NM
1997	World Championships	Athens, Greece	27th	71.56 m
1998	European Championships	Budapest, Hungary	6th	77.97m
1999	World Championships	Seville, Spain	6th	78.31 m
1999	Summer Universiade	Palma de Mallorca, Spain	2nd	79.83 (NR)
2000	Olympic Games	Sydney, Australia	24th	74.02 m
2001	World Championships	Edmonton, Canada	26th	73.79 m
2002	European Championships	Munich, Germany	27th	71.70 m
