= Vadim Khersontsev =

Russian hammer thrower

Personal information
- Born: 8 July 1974 (age 52) Kursk, Soviet Union

Sport
- Sport: Track and field
Medal record
Representing Russia
European Junior Championships
Bronze medal – third place	1993 San Sebastian	Hammer throw

Vadim Khersontsev (Russian: Вадим Херсонцев; born 8 July 1974) is a retired male hammer thrower from Russia, whose personal best throw is 81.26 metres, achieved in July 2001 in Bryansk.

== International competitions ==
Representing Russia
Year	Competition	Venue	Position	Notes
1993	European Junior Championships	San Sebastián, Spain	3rd	65.44 m
1996	Olympic Games	Atlanta, Georgia, United States	15th	74.48 m
1997	Summer Universiade	Catania, Italy	4th	75.70 m
1997	World Championships	Athens, Greece	7th	77.42 m
1999	Summer Universiade	Palma de Mallorca, Spain	4th	77.87 m
1999	World Championships	Seville, Spain	8th	76.96 m
2001	Summer Universiade	Beijing, China	8th	73.47 m
2002	European Championships	Munich, Germany	16th	77.00 m
2005	World Championships	Helsinki, Finland	7th	77.59 m
2006	European Championships	Gothenburg, Sweden	16th	73.24 m
