= Oleksandr Krykun =

Ukrainian hammer thrower

Personal information
- Native name: Олександр Володимирович Крикун
- Full name: Oleksandr Volodymyrovych Krykun
- Nationality: Ukrainian
- Born: 1 March 1968 (age 58) Leipzig, Saxony, East Germany
- Height: 1.94 m (6 ft 4 in)
- Weight: 125 kg (276 lb)

Sport
- Country: Ukraine
- Sport: Athletics
- Event: Hammer throw

Achievements and titles
- Personal best: 81.66 m (2004)
Medal record
Men's Athletics
Representing Ukraine
Olympic Games
Bronze medal – third place	1996 Atlanta	Hammer
Summer Universiade
Silver medal – second place	1995 Fukuoka	Hammer
Representing Soviet Union
European Athletics U20 Championships
Silver medal – second place	1987 Birmingham	Hammer

Oleksandr Volodymyrovych Krykun (Ukrainian: Олександр Володимирович Крикун; born 1 March 1968 in Leipzig, Sachsen) is a former Ukrainian hammer thrower. At the 1996 Olympics in Atlanta, Krykun won a bronze medal in hammer throw, averaging heaves of 80.02 meters.

== Achievements ==
Year	Competition	Venue	Position	Notes
Representing Ukraine
1994	European Championships	Helsinki, Finland	6th	76.08 m
1995	World Championships	Gothenburg, Sweden	10th	75.52 m
1996	Olympic Games	Atlanta, United States	3rd	80.02 m
1997	World Championships	Athens, Greece	8th	77.14 m
2000	Olympic Games	Sydney, Australia	20th	74.83 m
2001	World Championships	Edmonton, Canada	22nd	74.43 m
2002	European Championships	Munich, Germany	18th	76.92 m
2003	World Championships	Paris, France	21st	73.58 m
2004	Olympic Games	Athens, Greece	18th	75.42 m
