= Aleksandr Krasko =

Belarusian hammer thrower

Personal information
- Nationality: Belarusian
- Born: 7 April 1972 (age 54) Navapolatsk, Byelorussian SSR, USSR

Sport
- Sport: Athletics
- Event: Hammer throw

Aleksandr Krasko (born 7 April 1972) is a Belarusian athlete. He competed in the men's hammer throw at the 1996 Summer Olympics.
