= Marko Wahlman =

Finnish hammer thrower

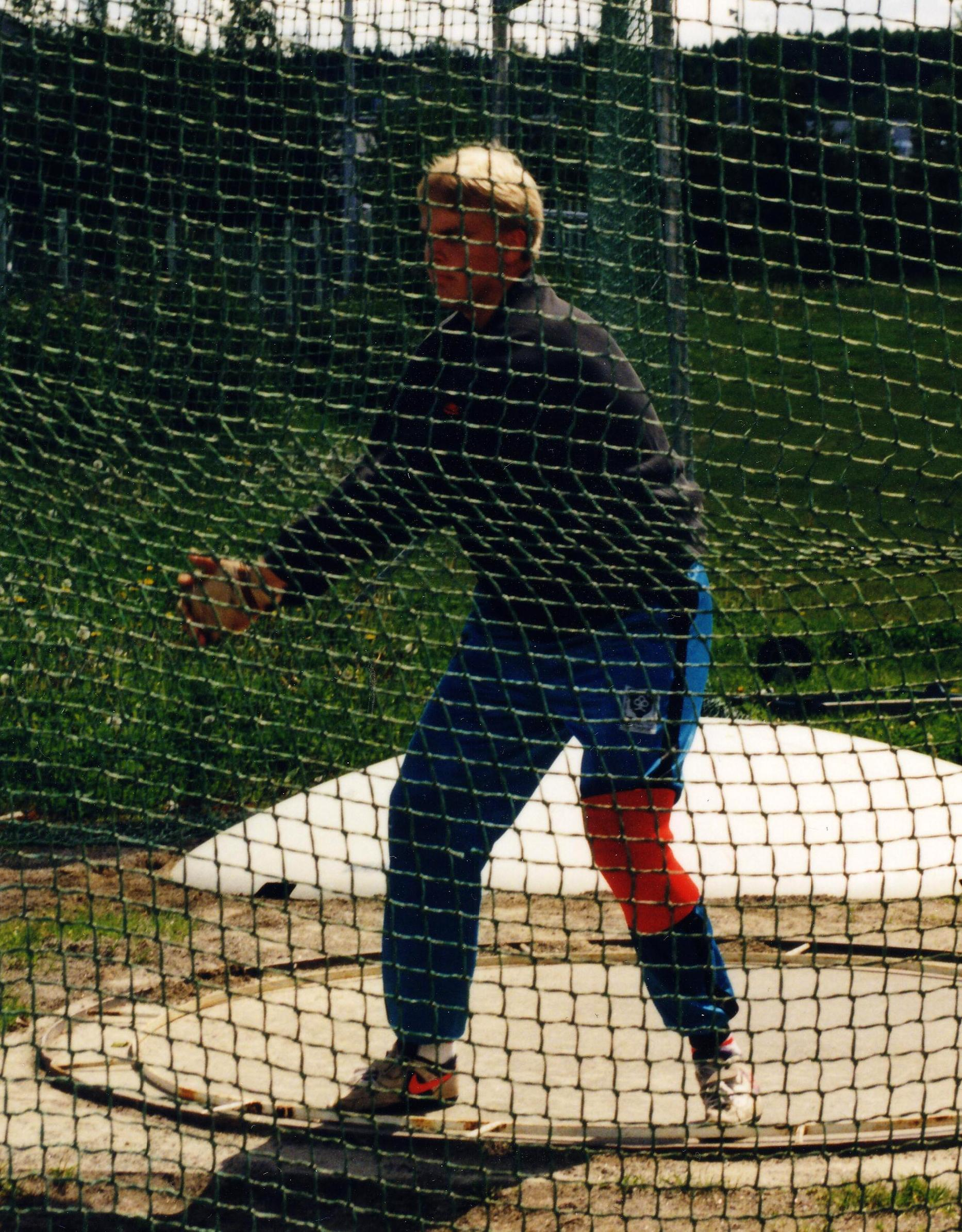
Wahlman, 1995

Marko Jaakko Tapani Wahlman (born 6 April 1969 in Pori) is a retired male hammer thrower from Finland. His personal best throw was 78.39 metres, which he achieved in July 1999 in Lappeenranta.

Wahlman was an NCAA champion thrower for the UTEP Miners track and field team, winning the weight throw at the 1993 NCAA Division I Indoor Track and Field Championships.

== Achievements ==
Year	Competition	Venue	Position	Notes
Representing Finland
1987	European Junior Championships	Birmingham, United Kingdom	9th	59.84 m
1988	World Junior Championships	Sudbury, Canada	11th	60.20 m
1993	World Championships	Stuttgart, Germany	20th	69.62 m
1994	European Championships	Helsinki, Finland	13th	73.96 m
1995	World Championships	Gothenburg, Sweden	12th	73.02 m
1996	Olympic Games	Atlanta, Georgia, United States	23rd	73.50 m
1997	World Championships	Athens, Greece	21st	73.60 m
1998	European Championships	Budapest, Hungary	—	NM
1999	World Championships	Seville, Spain	16th	75.04 m
