= Roman Linscheid =

Irish hammer thrower

Personal information
- Nationality: Irish
- Born: 29 December 1970 (age 55) Dublin, Ireland
- Height: 185 cm (6 ft 1 in)
- Weight: 114 kg (251 lb)

Sport
- Country: Ireland
- Sport: Hammer throw

Roman Linscheid (born 29 December 1970) is an Irish Olympic hammer thrower. He represented his country at the 1996 Summer Olympics. His best toss in those Olympics was a 68.14, while his personal best, set in 1999, was a 76.25. He is the brother of fellow Olympian Simon Linscheid, and competed domestically for Donore Harriers.

Linscheid competed for the St. John's Red Storm track and field team in the NCAA.
