= Heinz Weis =

German hammer thrower

Personal information
- Born: 14 July 1963 (age 62) Trier, Rhineland-Palatinate, West Germany
- Height: 1.93 m (6 ft 4 in)
- Weight: 125 kg (276 lb)

Sport
- Sport: Athletics
- Event: Hammer throw
- Club: TV 1863 Germania Trier; LG Bayer Leverkusen

Achievements and titles
- Personal best: 83.04 m (1997)
Medal record
Men's Athletics
Representing Germany
World Championships
| Gold medal – first place | 1997 Athens | Hammer |
| Bronze medal – third place | 1991 Tokyo | Hammer |
Universiade
Representing West Germany
| Gold medal – first place | 1985 Kobe | Hammer |
| Silver medal – second place | 1987 Zagreb | Hammer |
| Silver medal – second place | 1989 Duisburg | Hammer |
Representing Germany
| Bronze medal – third place | 1991 Sheffield | Hammer |
European Championships
| Bronze medal – third place | 1994 Helsinki | Hammer |

Heinz Weis (born 14 July 1963) is a male former hammer thrower from Germany. He competed for West Germany until 1990.

Weis was born in Trier, Rhineland-Palatinate, and at club level represented TV 1863 Germania Trier. He was coached initially by Ernst Klement and later by LG Bayer Leverkusen coaches Rudolf Hars and Bernhard Rieder. He competed in four Olympic Games. His personal best throw was 83.04 metres, achieved in June 1997 in Frankfurt. This ranks him second among German hammer throwers, only behind Ralf Haber.

While he was active he was 1.93 m and 125 kg. He has one daughter (Theresa).

== International competitions ==
| Year | Competition | Venue | Position | Notes |
Representing West Germany
| 1985 | World Student Games | Kobe, Japan | 1st | 76.00 m |
| 1987 | World Student Games | Zagreb, SFR Yugoslavia | 2nd | 76.98 m |
| 1987 | World Championships | Rome, Italy | 6th | 80.18 m |
| 1988 | Olympic Games | Seoul, South Korea | 5th | 79.16 m |
| 1989 | World Student Games | Duisburg, West Germany | 2nd | 79.58 m |
| 1989 | IAAF World Cup | Barcelona, Spain | 1st | 77.68 m |
| 1990 | European Championships | Split, Yugoslavia | 8th | 75.48 m |
Representing Germany
| 1991 | World Student Games | Sheffield, United Kingdom | 3rd | 75.62 m |
| 1991 | World Championships | Tokyo, Japan | 3rd | 80.44 m |
| 1992 | Olympic Games | Barcelona, Spain | 6th | 76.90 m |
| 1994 | European Championships | Helsinki, Finland | 3rd | 78.48 m |
| 1994 | IAAF World Cup | London, United Kingdom | 3rd | 80.32 m |
| 1995 | World Championships | Gothenburg, Sweden | — | DNS |
| 1996 | Olympic Games | Atlanta, Georgia, United States | 5th | 79.78 m |
| 1996 | IAAF Grand Prix Final | Milan, Italy | 3rd | 78.38 m |
| 1997 | World Championships | Athens, Greece | 1st | 81.78 m |
| 1998 | European Championships | Budapest, Hungary | 4th | 80.04 m |
| 1998 | IAAF World Cup | Johannesburg, South Africa | 2nd | 80.13 m |
| 1998 | IAAF Grand Prix Final | Moscow, Russia | 7th | 77.03 m |
| 1999 | World Championships | Seville, Spain | 18th | 74.71 m |
| 2000 | Olympic Games | Sydney, Australia | 26th | 73.51 m |
| 2000 | IAAF Grand Prix Final | Doha, Qatar | 5th | 77.97 m |
