= David Chaussinand =

French hammer thrower

Personal information
- Born: 19 April 1973 (age 53) Clermont-Ferrand, Auvergne, France

Sport
- Sport: Track and field

David Chaussinand (born 19 April 1973) is a retired male hammer thrower from France. He set his personal best (80.99 metres) on 19 August 2001 at a meet in Rüdlingen.

== Doping ==
Chaussinand tested positive for metenolone and clenbuterol in 2002 and received a three-year ban.

== Achievements ==
Year	Competition	Venue	Position	Notes
Representing France
1990	World Junior Championships	Plovdiv, Bulgaria	8th	62.38 m
1991	European Junior Championships	Thessaloniki, Greece	9th	61.88 m
1992	World Junior Championships	Seoul, South Korea	4th	68.20 m
1995	Summer Universiade	Fukuoka, Japan	8th	73.26 m
1997	World Championships	Athens, Greece	31st	71.20 m
1998	European Championships	Budapest, Hungary	23rd	73.30 m
1999	World Championships	Seville, Spain	24th	74.02 m
2000	Olympic Games	Sydney, Australia	11th	75.26 m
2001	World Championships	Edmonton, Canada	13th	76.66 m

== See also ==
- List of doping cases in athletics
