= Zsolt Németh (hammer thrower) =

Hungarian hammer thrower

Personal information
- Nationality: Hungary
- Born: 9 November 1971 (age 54) Szombathely, Hungary
- Height: 1.90 m (6 ft 3 in)
- Weight: 110 kg (243 lb)

Sport
- Country: Hungary
- Sport: Athletics
- Event: Hammer throw

Achievements and titles
- Personal best: 81.56 m (1999)
Medal record
Men's athletics
Representing Hungary
World Championships
Silver medal – second place	1999 Seville	Hammer throw
Summer Universiade
Gold medal – first place	1999 Palma de Mallorca	Hammer throw

Zsolt Németh (born 9 November 1971 in Szombathely, Vas) is a retired male hammer thrower from Hungary. His personal best throw was 81.56 metres, achieved in August 1999 in Veszprém. He is the son of coach Pál Németh.

== Achievements ==
Year	Competition	Venue	Position	Notes
Representing Hungary
1990	World Junior Championships	Plovdiv, Bulgaria	6th	64.00 m
1995	Summer Universiade	Fukuoka, Japan	6th	74.12 m
1996	Olympic Games	Atlanta, Georgia, United States	22nd	73.68 m
1997	World Championships	Athens, Greece	26th	71.80 m
1999	Summer Universiade	Palma de Mallorca, Spain	1st	80.40 m
1999	World Championships	Seville, Spain	2nd	79.05 m
2000	Olympic Games	Sydney, Australia	25th	73.95 m
2000	IAAF Grand Prix Final	Doha, Qatar	4th	78.67 m

== Awards ==
- Hungarian Athlete of the Year (1): 1999
