= Jan Bielecki (athlete) =

Danish hammer thrower

Personal information
- Nationality: Danish
- Born: 20 February 1971 (age 55) Copenhagen, Denmark

Sport
- Sport: Athletics
- Event: Hammer throw

Jan Bielecki (born 20 February 1971) is a Danish athlete. He competed in the men's hammer throw at the 1996 Summer Olympics and the 2000 Summer Olympics.

Bielecki competed for the Georgia Bulldogs track and field team in the NCAA.
