= Italy at the European Throwing Cup =

Italy team at athletics event

- WA code: ITA
- National federation: FIDAL
- Website: www.fidal.it
- Medals Ranked 7th: Gold 7 Silver 11 Bronze 17 Total 35

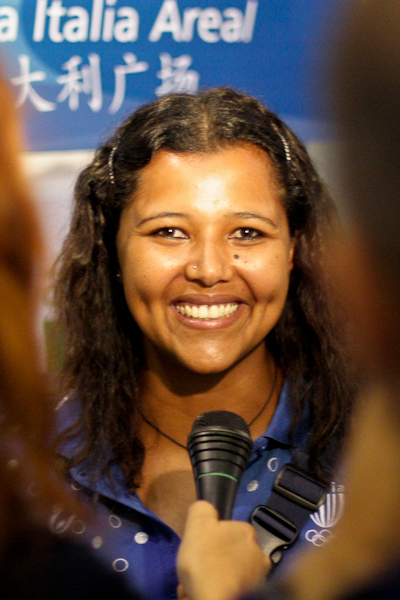
Zahra Bani, the Italian athlete with more appearances at the European Throwing Cup.

Italy at the European Throwing Cup participated at all editions of the European Throwing Cup from Nice 2001.

The event was called European Winter Throwing Challenge until 2004, than European Cup Winter Throwing until 2016.

== Medals ==
=== Individual ===
Edition	Event	Athlete	Medal
(France) Nice 2001	Men's shot put	Paolo Dal Soglio	2nd place, silver medalist(s)
(France) Nice 2001	Women's javelin throw	Claudia Coslovich	3rd place, bronze medalist(s)
(Croatia) Pula 2002	Women's javelin throw	Claudia Coslovich	1st place, gold medalist(s)
(Croatia) Pula 2002	Women's shot put	Assunta Legnante	2nd place, silver medalist(s)
(Italy) Gioia Tauro 2003	Men's hammer throw	Nicola Vizzoni	1st place, gold medalist(s)
(Italy) Gioia Tauro 2003	Women's shot put	Cristiana Checchi	3rd place, bronze medalist(s)
(Malta) Marsa 2004	Women's shot put	Assunta Legnante	2nd place, silver medalist(s)
(Turkey) Mersin 2005	Women's shot put	Assunta Legnante	2nd place, silver medalist(s)
(Ukraine) Yalta 2007	Women's shot put	Assunta Legnante	2nd place, silver medalist(s)
(Ukraine) Yalta 2007	Women's shot put	Chiara Rosa	3rd place, bronze medalist(s)
(Ukraine) Yalta 2007	Women's hammer throw	Ester Balassini	3rd place, bronze medalist(s)
(Ukraine) Yalta 2007	Women's javelin throw	Zahra Bani	3rd place, bronze medalist(s)
(Croatia) Split 2008	Men's hammer throw	Marco Lingua	1st place, gold medalist(s)
(Croatia) Split 2008	Women's shot put	Assunta Legnante	1st place, gold medalist(s)
(Croatia) Split 2008	Women's shot put	Chiara Rosa	3rd place, bronze medalist(s)
(Croatia) Split 2008	Women's javelin throw	Zahra Bani	3rd place, bronze medalist(s)
(Spain) Los Realejos 2009	Men's hammer throw	Marco Lingua	2nd place, silver medalist(s)
(Spain) Los Realejos 2009	Men's hammer throw	Nicola Vizzoni	3rd place, bronze medalist(s)
(Spain) Los Realejos 2009	Women's shot put	Chiara Rosa	3rd place, bronze medalist(s)
(Spain) Los Realejos 2009	Women's hammer throw	Silvia Salis	3rd place, bronze medalist(s)
(France) Arles 2010	Men's hammer throw	Nicola Vizzoni	1st place, gold medalist(s)
(France) Arles 2010	Women's hammer throw	Silvia Salis	2nd place, silver medalist(s)
(Bulgaria) Sofia 2011	Women's shot put	Chiara Rosa	3rd place, bronze medalist(s)
(Portugal) Leiria 2015	Women's shot put	Chiara Rosa	3rd place, bronze medalist(s)
(Romania) Arad 2016	Men's javelin throw	Norbert Bonvecchio	2nd place, silver medalist(s)
(Romania) Arad 2016	Men's shot put	Sebastiano Bianchetti	3rd place, bronze medalist(s)
(Romania) Arad 2016	Men's hammer throw	Marco Lingua	3rd place, bronze medalist(s)
(Spain) Gran Canaria 2017	Men's javelin throw	Roberto Bertolini	2nd place, silver medalist(s)
(Spain) Gran Canaria 2017	Men's hammer throw	Simone Falloni	3rd place, bronze medalist(s)
(Slovakia) Šamorín 2019	Men's javelin throw	Mauro Fraresso	3rd place, bronze medalist(s)
(Portugal) Leiria 2022	Men's dhot put	Zane Weir	1st place, gold medalist(s)
(Portugal) Leiria 2022	Men's dhot put	Nick Ponzio	2nd place, silver medalist(s)
(Portugal) Leiria 2022	Men's javelin throw	Roberto Orlando	3rd place, bronze medalist(s)
(Portugal) Leiria 2022	Women's discus throw	Daisy Osakue	1st place, gold medalist(s)
(Portugal) Leiria 2022	women's hammer throw	Sara Fantini	3rd place, bronze medalist(s)

=== Team ===
Edition	Men	Women
(France) Nice 2001	2nd place, silver medalist(s)	5
(Croatia) Pula 2002	4	2nd place, silver medalist(s)
(Italy) Gioia Tauro 2003	3rd place, bronze medalist(s)	3rd place, bronze medalist(s)
(Malta) Marsa 2004	3rd place, bronze medalist(s)	3rd place, bronze medalist(s)
(Turkey) Mersin 2005	3rd place, bronze medalist(s)	3rd place, bronze medalist(s)
(Israel) Tel Aviv 2006	2nd place, silver medalist(s)	2nd place, silver medalist(s)
(Ukraine) Yalta 2007	4	2nd place, silver medalist(s)
(Croatia) Split 2008	NC	1st place, gold medalist(s)
(Spain) Los Realejos 2009	NC	2nd place, silver medalist(s)
(France) Arles 2010	NC	4
(Spain) Gran Canaria 2017	1st place, gold medalist(s)	4
(Portugal) Leiria 2018	3rd place, bronze medalist(s)	5
(Slovakia) Šamorín 2019	2nd place, silver medalist(s)	8
~~(Portugal) Leiria 2020~~ (Note: Cancelled due to the COVID-19 pandemic)	Non disputed	
(Croatia) Split 2021	4	5
(Portugal) Leiria 2022	1st place, gold medalist(s)	2nd place, silver medalist(s)

== See also ==
- Italy national athletics team
