= Zahra Bani =

Somali-Italian javelin thrower

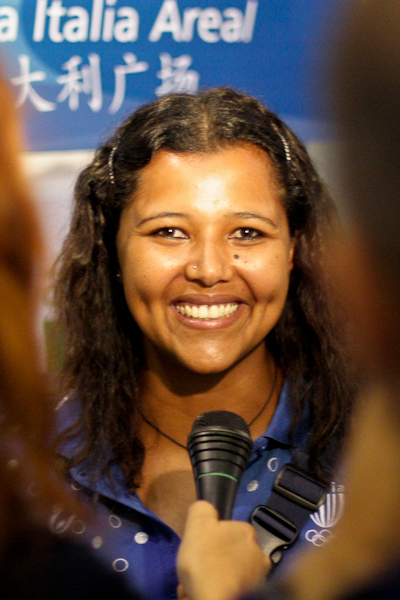

Personal information
- National team: Italy: 27 caps (2001-2021)
- Born: 31 December 1979 (age 46) Mogadishu, Somalia
- Height: 1.73 m (5 ft 8 in)
- Weight: 73 kg (161 lb)

Sport
- Sport: Athletics
- Event: Javelin throw
- Club: G.S. Fiamme Azzurre
- Coached by: Maria Marello

Achievements and titles
- Personal best: Javelin throw 62.75 m (2005)
Medal record
Event	1st	2nd	3rd
European Throwing Cup	0	0	2
European Team Championships	0	0	3
Mediterranean Games	0	2	0
Total	0	2	5
European Throwing Cup
Bronze medal – third place	2007 Yalta	Javelin Throw
Bronze medal – third place	2008 Split	Javelin Throw
European Team Championships
Bronze medal – third place	2005 Florence	Javelin Throw
Bronze medal – third place	2008 Annecy	Javelin Throw
Bronze medal – third place	2009 Leiria	Javelin Throw
Mediterranean Games
Silver medal – second place	2005 Almeria	Javelin Throw
Silver medal – second place	2009 Pescara	Javelin Throw

Zahra Bani (born 31 December 1979) is a Somali-born Italian javelin thrower.

== Biography ==
Bani was born in 1979 in Mogadishu, the capital of Somalia, to an Italian father and a Somali mother. In 1989, she moved to Turin, Italy with her family and started playing volleyball. She soon thereafter discovered her specialty: javelin. Bani's personal best throw is 62.75 metres, achieved at the 2005 World Championships in Helsinki. However, since 2005, she has been suffering from health problems, which have significantly hampered her athletic performances. Bani ranks second on the all-time Italian list behind Claudia Coslovich. She retired in 2022 and is now a coach in Turin, Italy.

== Achievements ==
Year	Competition	Venue	Position	Event	Measure	Notes
1998	World Junior Championships	Annecy, France	26th (q)	Javelin throw	44.38 m	(Note: Old speciality.)
1999	European U23 Championships	Gothenburg, Sweden	6th	Javelin throw	51.90 m	
2001	European Throwing Cup	Nice, France	13th	Javelin throw	51.10 m	
2001	European U23 Championships	Amsterdam, Netherlands	21st (q)	Javelin throw	43.78 m	
2003	European Throwing Cup	Gioia Tauro, Italy	9th	Javelin throw	54.10 m	
2005	World Championships	Helsinki, Finland	5th	Javelin throw	62.75 m	PB
2005	Universiade	İzmir, Turkey	6th	Javelin throw	55.02 m	
2005	European Cup (Super League)	Florence, Italy	3rd	Javelin throw	61.66 m	
2005	Mediterranean Games	Almería, Spain	2nd	Javelin throw	62.36 m	
2005	World Athletics Final	Monte Carlo, Monaco	8th	Javelin throw	55.02 m	
2006	European Throwing Cup	Tel Aviv, Israel	5th	Javelin throw	56.54 m	
2006	European Championships	Gothenburg, Sweden	9th	Javelin throw	57.91 m	
2006	World Athletics Final	Stuttgart, Germany	6th	Javelin throw	60.54 m	
2007	European Throwing Cup	Yalta, Ukraine	3rd	Javelin throw	58.95 m	
2007	World Championships	Osaka, Japan	14th	Javelin throw	59.02 m	
2008	European Throwing Cup	Split, Croatia	3rd	Javelin throw	59.42 m	
2008	European Cup (Super League)	Annecy, France	3rd	Javelin throw	58.13 m	
2008	Olympic Games	Beijing, China	—	Javelin throw	NM	
2008	World Athletics Final	Stuttgart, Germany	4th	Javelin throw	60.22 m	
2009	European Throwing Cup	Los Realejos, Spain	9th	Javelin throw	55.19 m	
2009	European Team Championships (SL)	Leiria, Portugal	3rd	Javelin throw	59.11 m	SB
2009	Mediterranean Games	Pescara, Italy	2nd	Javelin throw	60.65 m	
2010	European Throwing Cup	Arles, France	8th	Javelin throw	56.93 m	
2010	European Team Championships (SL)	Bergen, Norway	7th	Javelin throw	54.79 m	
2010	European Championships	Barcelona, Spain	11th	Javelin throw	53.67 m	
2011	European Throwing Cup	Sofia, Bulgaria	4th	Javelin throw	54.55 m	
2011	European Team Championships (SL)	Stockholm, Sweden	6th	Javelin throw	55.92 m	
2011	World Championships	Daegu, South Korea	13th	Javelin throw	58.92 m	
2012	European Throwing Cup	Bar, Montenegro	7th	Javelin throw	56.99 m	
2012	European Championships	Helsinki, Finland	12th	Javelin throw	53.40 m	
2015	European Throwing Cup	Leiria, Portugal	13th	Javelin throw	51,32 m	
2017	European Throwing Cup	Las Palmas, Spain	8th	Javelin throw	55,85 m	
2018	European Throwing Cup	Leiria, Portugal	5th	Javelin throw	56.48 m	SB
2021	European Throwing Cup	Split, Croatia	11th	Javelin throw	57.15 m	SB

== National titles ==
Bani won 17 national championships at individual senior level.

- Italian Athletics Championships
  - Javelin throw: 2005, 2006, 2009, 2010, 2011, 2012, 2017, 2021 (8)
- Italian Winter Throwing Championships
  - Javelin throw: 2006, 2008, 2009, 2010, 2011, 2012, 2013, 2015, 2017 (9)

== See also ==
- Italian Athletics Championships - Multi winners
- Italian all-time lists - Javelin throw
- Italy at the European Throwing Cup
- Naturalized athletes of Italy
- Italian Somalis
