= European Throwing Cup =

The European Throwing Cup (known as European Cup Winter Throwing until 2015) is an annual continental athletics competition for athletes specialising in the events of discus, javelin and hammer throwing and the shot put. The winter event, organised every March by the European Athletics Association, is intended as a counterbalance to the fact that indoor track and field meetings cannot host the longer throwing events. It allows athletes who specialise in throwing events to gauge their form for the forthcoming outdoor athletics season.

The event was first held in Nice, France, in 2001 as the European Winter Throwing Challenge. It was renamed as a European Cup event in 2005 when it was held in Mersin, Turkey.

== Editions ==
Edition	Year	Host City	Host Country	Dates	Athletes	Nations	Events
Name: European Cup Winter Throwing
Senior
1	2001	Nice	France	17–18 March	80 men/71 women	21	8
2	2002	Pula	Croatia	9–10 March	99 men/76 women	26	8
3	2003	Gioia Tauro	Italy	1–2 March	71 men/66 women	25	8
4	2004	Marsa	Malta	13–14 March	71 men/76 women	27	8
5	2005	Mersin	Turkey	12–13 March	89 men/85 women	30	8
6	2006	Tel Aviv	Israel	18–19 March	86 men/82 women	28	8
Senior + U23
7	2007	Yalta	Ukraine	17–18 March	96 men/98 women	28	16
8	2008	Split	Croatia	15–16 March	121 men/108 women	34	16
9	2009	Tenerife	Spain	14–15 March	119 men/107 women	29	16
10	2010	Arles	France	20–21 March	166 men/114 women	30	16
11	2011	Sofia	Bulgaria	19–20 March	125 men/123 women	33	16
12	2012	Bar	Montenegro	17–18 March	142 men/140 women	33	16
13	2013	Castellón	Spain	16–17 March	249	38	16
14	2014	Leiria	Portugal	15–16 March	280		16
15	2015	Leiria	Portugal	14–15 March	248		16
Name: European Throwing Cup
16	2016	Arad	Romania	12–13 March	282		16
17	2017	Las Palmas	Spain	11–12 March	249		16
18	2018	Leiria	Portugal	10–11 March	291	39	16
19	2019	Šamorín	Slovakia	9–10 March	170 men/159 women	38	16
	~~2020~~	~~Leiria~~	~~Portugal~~	~~21-22 March~~	Cancelled due to the COVID-19 pandemic		
20	2021	Split	Croatia	8–9 May	213 men/186 women	42	16
21	2022	Leiria	Portugal	12–13 March	155 men/146 women	38	16
22	2023	Leiria	Portugal	11–12 March	171 men/148 women	40	16
23	2024	Leiria	Portugal	9–10 March	152 men/149 women	41	16
24	2025	Nicosia	Cyprus	15–16 March	156+5(R) men/146+4(R) women	39	16
25	2026	Nicosia	Cyprus	14–15 March	147 men/137 women	35	16
26	2027	Nicosia	Cyprus	13–14 March			

== Championships records ==
=== Senior men ===
Event	Record	Athlete	Nation	Date	Meet	Ref
Shot put	21.99 m	Zane Weir	Italy	13 March 2022	2022 Leiria	
Discus throw	69.70 m	Gerd Kanter	Estonia	15 March 2009	2009 Tenerife	
Hammer throw	82.27 m	Aleksey Zagornyi	Russia	9 March 2002	2002 Pula	
Javelin throw	92.70 m	Johannes Vetter	Germany	11 March 2018	2018 Leiria	

=== Senior women ===
Event	Record	Athlete	Nation	Date	Meet	Ref
Shot put	20.03 m^{[a]}	Vita Pavlysh	Ukraine	10 March 2002	2002 Pula	
Discus throw	68.89 m	Nadine Müller	Germany	18 March 2012	2012 Bar	
Hammer throw	77.07 m	Silja Kosonen	Finland	15 March 2025	2025 Nicosia	
Javelin throw	71.40 m	Maria Andrejczyk	Poland	9 May 2021	2021 Split	

- ^{a} Nadzeya Astapchuk set a record of 20.29 m for the women's shot put in 2012, but this was later annulled following retesting of her doping violation as she tested positive for steroids at the 2005 World Championships in Athletics and again at the 2012 Olympic Games.

=== U-23 men ===
Event	Record	Athlete	Nation	Date	Meet	Ref
Shot put	20.27 m	Giorgi Mujaridze	Georgia	10 March 2019	2019 Šamorín	
Discus throw	64.37 m	Yauheni Bahutski	Belarus	8 May 2021	2021 Split	
Hammer throw	78.59 m	Yury Shayunou	Belarus	15 March 2009	2009 Tenerife	
Javelin throw	83.41 m	Maksym Bohdan	Ukraine	16 March 2014	2014 Leiria	

=== U-23 women ===
Event	Record	Athlete	Nation	Date	Meet	Ref
Shot put	17.92 m	Anita Márton	Hungary	19 March 2011	2011 Sofia	
Discus throw	67.19 m	Sandra Perković	Croatia	18 March 2012	2012 Bar	
Hammer throw	69.95 m	Alena Sobaleva	Belarus	15 March 2015	2015 Leiria	
Javelin throw	63.17 m	Liina Laasma	Estonia	15 March 2014	2014 Leiria	

== Senior Summary ==
=== Shot put (men) ===
Year	1st place, gold medalist(s)	Measure	2nd place, silver medalist(s)	Measure	3rd place, bronze medalist(s)	Measure
2001	Manuel Martínez (ESP)	20.27 m	Paolo Dal Soglio (ITA)	19.96 m	Gheorghe Gușet (ROU)	19.50 m
2002	Manuel Martínez (ESP)	20.92 m	Rutger Smith (NLD)	19.85 m	Leszek Sliwa (POL)	19.78 m
2003	Rutger Smith (NLD)	20.52 m	Ivan Yushkov (RUS)	19.54 m	Peter Sack (GER)	19.53 m
2004	Rutger Smith (NLD)	20.23 m	Miroslav Vodovnik (SVN)	19.65 m	Grigoriy Panfilov (RUS)	19.43 m
2005	Rutger Smith (NLD)	21.00 m	Gheorghe Gușet (ROU)	20.75 m	Manuel Martínez (ESP)	20.22 m
2006	Gheorghe Gușet (ROU)	20.41 m	Tomasz Majewski (POL)	20.26 m	Pavel Sofin (RUS)	20.19 m
2007	Yuriy Bilonoh (UKR)	19.95 m	Pavel Lyzhyn (BLR)	19.86 m	Dzimitry Hancharuk (BLR)	19.42 m
2008	Rutger Smith (NLD)	20.77 m	Marco Fortes (POR)	20.13 m	Hamza Alić (BIH)	20.13 m
2009	Lajos Kürthy (HUN)	20.06 m	Manuel Martínez (ESP)	20.00 m	Nedžad Mulabegović (CRO)	19.69 m
2010	Asmir Kolašinac (SRB)	20.15 m	Lajos Kürthy (HUN)	20.07 m	Marco Fortes (POR)	19.85 m
2011	Hamza Alić (BIH)	20.21 m	Marco Fortes (POR)	20.18 m	Soslan Tsirikhov (RUS)	19.45 m
2012	Marco Fortes (POR)	21.02 m	Asmir Kolašinac (SRB)	20.50 m	Borja Vivas (ESP)	20.06 m
2013	Borja Vivas (ESP)	20.00 m	Georgi Ivanov (BGR)	1968 m	Andriy Semenov (UKR)	19.55 m
2014	Aleksandr Lesnoy (RUS)	21.23 m	Marco Fortes (POR)	21.01 m	Georgi Ivanov (BGR)	20.59 m
2015	Borja Vivas (ESP)	20.15 m	Leif Arrhenius (SWE)	20.09 m	Carlos Tobalina (ESP)	20.04 m
2016	Andrei Gag (ROU)	20.96 m	Tsanko Arnaudov (POR)	19.85 m	Sebastiano Bianchetti (ITA)	19.78 m
2017	Mesud Pezer (BIH)	20.69 m	Carlos Tobalina (ESP)	20.57 m	Francisco Belo (POR)	20.52 m
2018	Aleksandr Lesnoy (ANA)	21.32 m	Michał Haratyk (POL)	21.18 m	Mesud Pezer (BIH)	20.71 m
2019	Francisco Belo (POR)	20.97 m	Maksim Afonin (ANA)	20.61 m	Bob Bertemes (LUX)	20.55 m
2021	Andrei Toader (ROU)	20.83 m	Francisco Belo (PRT)	20.47 m	Scott Lincoln (GBR)	20.25 m
2022	Zane Weir (ITA)	21.99 m	Nick Ponzio (ITA)	21.83 m	Marcus Thomsen (NOR)	20.63 m
2023	Roman Kokoško (UKR)	21.52 m	Bob Bertemes (LUX)	21.21 m	Zane Weir (ITA)	20.98 m
2024	Zane Weir (ITA)	21.55 m	Scott Lincoln (GBR)	20.98 m	Mesud Pezer (BIH)	20.58 m
2025	Nick Ponzio (ITA)	20.60 m	Silas Ristl (GER)	20.27 m	Jesper Arbinge (SWE)	19.93 m
2026	Konrad Bukowiecki (POL)	20.43 m	Nick Ponzio (ITA)	19.97 m	Eric Favors (IRL)	19.68 m

=== Discus throw (men) ===
Year	1st place, gold medalist(s)	Measure	2nd place, silver medalist(s)	Measure	3rd place, bronze medalist(s)	Measure
2001	Timo Tompuri (FIN)	61.79 m	Andrzej Krawczyk (POL)	61.60 m	Aleksandr Borichevskiy (RUS)	61.22 m
2002	David Martínez (ESP)	63.09 m	Aleksandr Borichevskiy (RUS)	61.72 m	Rutger Smith (NLD)	61.68 m
2003	Gerd Kanter (EST)	64.17 m	Mario Pestano (ESP)	63.71 m	Ionel Oprea (ROU)	62.29 m
2004	Gerd Kanter (EST)	63.21 m	Mario Pestano (ESP)	62.00 m	Rutger Smith (NLD)	59.84 m
2005	Gerd Kanter (EST)	66.05 m	Gábor Máté (HUN)	64.17 m	Rutger Smith (NLD)	62.80 m
2006	Piotr Małachowski (POL)	65.01 m	Mario Pestano (ESP)	63.40 m	Gerd Kanter (EST)	62.55 m
2007	Gerd Kanter (EST)	65.43 m	Piotr Małachowski (POL)	65.06 m	Ercüment Olgundeniz (TUR)	63.34 m
2008	Gerd Kanter (EST)	65.25 m	Robert Harting (GER)	64.34 m	Rutger Smith (NLD)	63.80 m
2009	Gerd Kanter (EST)	69.70 m	Frank Casañas (ESP)	64.70 m	Erik Cadée (NLD)	61.89 m
2010	Markus Münch (GER)	65.37 m	Mario Pestano (ESP)	63.78 m	Sergiu Ursu (ROU)	61.19 m
2011	Ercüment Olgundeniz (TUR)	63.31 m	Erik Cadée (NLD)	62.15 m	Sergiu Ursu (ROU)	62.00 m
2012	Erik Cadée (NLD)	64.09 m	Ercüment Olgundeniz (TUR)	63.59 m	Rutger Smith (NLD)	63.30 m
2013	Daniel Jasinski (GER)	64.69 m	Virgilijus Alekna (LTU)	64.66 m	Erik Cadée (NLD)	64.38 m
2014	Viktor Butenko (RUS)	64.38 m	Erik Cadée (NLD)	63.56 m	Christoph Harting (GER)	62.56 m
2015	Martin Kupper (EST)	66.67 m	Andrius Gudžius (LTU)	65.51 m	Viktor Butenko (RUS)	65.44 m
2016	Axel Härstedt (SWE)	62.73 m	Martin Kupper (EST)	62.20 m	Mykyta Nesterenko (UKR)	62.01 m
2017	Lukas Weißhaidinger (AUT)	65.73 m	Andrius Gudžius (LTU)	64.18 m	Martin Kupper (EST)	62.86 m
2018	Daniel Ståhl (SWE)	66.81 m	Simon Pettersson (SWE)	65.81 m	János Huszák (HUN)	63.45 m
2019	Philip Milanov (BEL)	62.63 m	Christoph Harting (GER)	62.61 m	Martin Kupper (EST)	62.11 m
2021	János Huszák (HUN)	65.35 m	Guðni Valur Guðnason (ISL)	63.66 m	Marek Bárta (CZE)	63.33 m
2022	Kristjan Čeh (SLO)	66.11 m	Daniel Ståhl (SWE)	65.95 m	Simon Pettersson (SWE)	63.80 m
2023	Kristjan Čeh (SVN)	68.30 m	Alin Firfirică (ROU)	63.78 m	Martin Marković (HRV)	62.20 m
2024	Alin Alexandru Firfirică (ROU)	66.07 m	Simon Pettersson (SWE)	63.08 m	Daniel Jasinski (GER)	61.84 m
2025	Henrik Janssen (GER)	65.77 m	Kristjan Čeh (SLO)	65.69 m	Martynas Alekna (LTU)	63.96 m
2026	Steven Richter (GER)	67.29 m	Alin Alexandru Firfircă (ROM)	65.95 m	Ruben Rolvink (NED)	65.47 m

=== Hammer throw (men) ===
Year	1st place, gold medalist(s)	Measure	2nd place, silver medalist(s)	Measure	3rd place, bronze medalist(s)	Measure
2001	David Chaussinand (FRA)	76.54 m	Vladyslav Piskunov (UKR)	76.41 m	Alexandros Papadimitriou (GRE)	76.36 m
2002	Aleksey Zagornyi (RUS)	82.27 m	Alexandros Papadimitriou (GRE)	79.67 m	Miloslav Konopka (SVK)	78.58 m
2003	Nicola Vizzoni (ITA)	75.35 m	Alexandros Papadimitriou (GRE)	74.74 m	Ilya Konovalov (RUS)	74.73 m
2004	Krisztián Pars (HUN)	79.69 m	Eşref Apak (TUR)	77.76 m	Alexandros Papadimitriou (GRE)	77.13 m
2005	Ivan Tsikhan (BLR)	80.79 m	Aleksey Zagornyi (RUS)	78.11 m	Ilya Konovalov (RUS)	77.35 m
2006	Szymon Ziółkowski (POL)	79.04 m	Vadim Khersontsev (RUS)	78.54 m	Dzmitry Shako (BLR)	77.00 m
2007	Primož Kozmus (SVN)	77.99 m	Ivan Tsikhan (BLR)	77.79 m	Eşref Apak (TUR)	76.68 m
2008	Marco Lingua (ITA)	77.87 m	Krisztián Pars (HUN)	77.06 m	Dzmitry Shako (BLR)	76.86 m
2009	Krisztián Pars (HUN)	80.38 m	Marco Lingua (ITA)	79.66 m	Nicola Vizzoni (ITA)	78.51 m
2010	Nicola Vizzoni (ITA)	76.63 m	Jury Szajunou (BLR)	76.30 m	Aleksey Zagornyi (RUS)	75.58 m
2011	Krisztián Pars (HUN)	79.84 m	Jury Szajunou (BLR)	77.41 m	Oleksly Sokyrskyy (UKR)	76.84 m
2012	Kirill Ikonnikov (RUS)	75.95 m	Siarhei Kalamoyets (BLR)	75.15 m	Kristóf Németh (HUN)	74.23 m
2013	Krisztián Pars (HUN)	76.80 m	Paweł Fajdek (POL)	75.52 m	Markus Esser (GER)	74.71 m
2014	Paweł Fajdek (POL)	78.75 m	Krisztián Pars (HUN)	77.96 m	Denis Lukyanov (RUS)	74.11 m
2015	Krisztián Pars (HUN)	79.24 m	Paweł Fajdek (POL)	76.19 m	Serghei Marghiev (MDA)	73.84 m
2016	Krisztián Pars (HUN)	75.21 m	Siarhei Kalamoyets (BLR)	75.17 m	Marco Lingua (ITA)	74.51 m
2017	Quentin Bigot (FRA)	76.55 m	Pavel Bareisha (BLR)	74.41 m	Simone Falloni (ITA)	74.37 m
2018	Paweł Fajdek (POL)	77.30 m	Marcel Lomnický (SVK)	75.97 m	Özkan Baltacı (TUR)	75.71 m
2019	Quentin Bigot (FRA)	78.14 m	Mihaíl Anastasákis (GRE)	76.38 m	Yevgeniy Korotovskiy (ANA)	76.33 m
2021	Eşref Apak (TUR)	75.99 m	Chris Bennett (GBR)	75.36 m	Yann Chaussinand (FRA)	74.54 m
2022	Bence Halász (HUN)	76.69 m	Javier Cienfuegos (ESP)	75.59 m	Ragnar Carlsson (SWE)	75.26 m
2023	Bence Halász (HUN)	74.65 m	Thomas Mardal (NOR)	73.94 m	Yann Chaussinand (FRA)	73.25 m
2024	Mykhaylo Kokhan (UKR)	78.13 m	Bence Halász (HUN)	76.22 m	Hristos Frantzeskakis (GRE)	74.96 m
2025	Bence Halász (HUN)	78.75 m	Volodymyr Myslyvčuk (CZE)	77.98 m	Thomas Mardal (NOR)	77.43 m
2026	Volodymyr Myslyvčuk (CZE)	80.69 m	Bence Halász (HUN)	80.31 m	Hilmar Örn Jónsson (ISL)	78.03 m

=== Javelin throw (men) ===
Year	1st place, gold medalist(s)	Measure	2nd place, silver medalist(s)	Measure	3rd place, bronze medalist(s)	Measure
2001	Peter Blank (GER)	82.10 m	Gregor Högler (AUT)	80.81 m	Björn Lange (GER)	78.60 m
2002	Aleksandr Ivanov (RUS)	81.71 m	Stefan Wenk (GER)	78.46 m	Marián Bokor (SVK)	76.91 m
2003	Christian Nicolay (GER)	83.80 m	Aleksandr Ivanov (RUS)	79.24 m	Dominique Pausé (FRA)	78.60 m
2004	Vadims Vasiļevskis (LVA)	82.44 m	Ainārs Kovals (LVA)	82.13 m	Teemu Wirkkala (FIN)	80.87 m
2005	Aleksandr Ivanov (RUS)	81.13 m	Igor Sukhomlinov (RUS)	80.02 m	Manuel Nau (GER)	76.76 m
2006	Igor Janik (POL)	81.16 m	Vladislav Shkurlatov (RUS)	79.27 m	Ainārs Kovals (LVA)	78.64 m
2007	Igor Sukhomlinov (RUS)	83.34 m	Magnus Arvidsson (SWE)	76.72 m	Ainārs Kovals (LVA)	76.64 m
2008	Ilya Korotkov (RUS)	81.52 m	Stephan Steding (GER)	79.55 m	Mihkel Kukk (EST)	78.41 m
2009	Tino Häber (GER)	77.68 m	Mihkel Kukk (EST)	76.60 m	Mervyn Luckwell (GBR)	74.86 m
2010	Ilya Korotkov (RUS)	83.28 m	Oleksandr Pyatnytsya (UKR)	79.38 m	Paweł Rakoczy (POL)	78.13 m
2011	Zigismunds Sirmais (LVA)	84.47 m	Oleksandr Pyatnytsya (UKR)	81.96 m	Valeriy Iordan (RUS)	79.49 m
2012	Fatih Avan (TUR)	81.09 m	Dmitry Tarabin (RUS)	79.94 m	Risto Mätas (EST)	78.74 m
2013	Zigismunds Sirmais (LTU)	82.51 m	Thomas Röhler (GER)	81.87 m	Risto Mätas (EST)	79.10 m
2014	Zigismunds Sirmais (LTU)	81.60 m	Thomas Röhler (GER)	81.17 m	Risto Mätas (EST)	80.58 m
2015	Valeriy Iordan (RUS)	83.00 m	Thomas Röhler (GER)	81.83 m	Fatih Avan (TUR)	81.45 m
2016	Uladzimir Kazlou (BLR)	79.34 m	Norbert Bonvecchio (ITA)	76.66 m	Zigismunds Sirmais (LVA)	75.41 m
2017	Julian Weber (GER)	85.85 m	Roberto Bertolini (ITA)	78.78 m	Paraskevás Batzávalis (GRE)	78.40 m
2018	Johannes Vetter (GER)	92.70 m	Bernhard Seifert (GER)	80.62 m	Mart ten Berge (NED)	79.92 m
2019	Matija Kranjc (SLO)	76.17 m	Norbert Rivasz-Tóth (HUN)	76.11 m	Mauro Fraresso (ITA)	75.00 m
2021	Johannes Vetter (DEU)	91.12 m	Andrian Mardare (MDA)	86.66 m	Pavel Mialeshka (BLR)	82.55 m
2022	Alexandru Novac (ROU)	80.49 m	Patriks Gailums (LAT)	79.49 m	Roberto Orlando (ITA)	78.19 m
2023	Leandro Ramos (PRT)	78.57 m	Dagbjartur Daði Jónsson (ISL)	78.56 m	Manu Quijera (ESP)	78.42 m
2024	Artur Felfner (UKR)	81.89 m	Alexandru Novac (ROU)	80.73 m	Ioannis Kiriazis (GRE)	80.52 m
2025	Ioannis Kiriazis (GRE)	84.38 m	Giovanni Frattini (ITA)	82.78 m	Cyprian Mrzygłód (POL)	82.46 m
2026	Nick Thumm (GER)	81.05 m	Simon Wieland (SUI)	80.76 m	Michele Fina (ITA)	79.95 m

=== Shot put (women) ===
Year	1st place, gold medalist(s)	Measure	2nd place, silver medalist(s)	Measure	3rd place, bronze medalist(s)	Measure
2001	Vita Pavlysh (UKR)	19.47 m	Larisa Peleshenko (RUS)	18.77 m	Lyudmila Sechko (RUS)	18.54 m
2002	Vita Pavlysh (UKR)	20.03 m	Assunta Legnante (ITA)	18.15 m	Irina Khudoroshkina (RUS)	17.88 m
2003	Irina Khudoroshkina (RUS)	18.47 m	Anna Romanova (RUS)	18.09 m	Cristiana Checchi (ITA)	17.91 m
2004	Nadine Kleinert (GER)	18.17 m	Assunta Legnante (ITA)	17.96 m	Irina Khudoroshkina (RUS)	17.70 m
2005	Olga Ryabinkina (RUS)	18.41 m	Assunta Legnante (ITA)	17.98 m	Kristin Marten (GER)	17.68 m
2006	Natallia Mikhnevich (BLR)	19.18 m	Olga Ryabinkina (RUS)	18.55 m	Nadine Kleinert (GER)	18.30 m
2007	Petra Lammert (GER)	18.67 m	Assunta Legnante (ITA)	18.31 m	Chiara Rosa (ITA)	18.14 m
2008	Assunta Legnante (ITA)	18.98 m	Anna Omarova (RUS)	18.38 m	Chiara Rosa (ITA)	18.05 m
2009	Nadzeya Astapchuk (BLR)	18.80 m	Anca Heltne (ROU)	18.76 m	Chiara Rosa (ITA)	18.55 m
2010	Nadzeya Astapchuk (BLR)	20.16 m	Natallia Mikhnevich (BLR)	19.55 m	Anca Heltne (ROU)	19.11 m
2011	Alena Abramchuk (BLR)	17.71 m	Jessica Cérival (FRA)	17.52 m	Chiara Rosa (ITA)	17.39 m
2012	Nadzeya Astapchuk (BLR)	20.29 m	Nadine Kleinert (GER)	19.12 m	Josephine Terlecki (GER)	18.59 m
2013	Yevgeniya Kolodko (RUS)	19.04 m	Alena Abramchuk (BLR)	18.18 m	Irina Tarasova (RUS)	17.98 m
2014	Yevgeniya Kolodko (RUS)	18.66 m	Alena Abramchuk (BLR)	18.58 m	Yuliya Leantsiuk (BLR)	18.55 m
2015	Yuliya Leantsiuk (BLR)	18.56 m	Anita Márton (HUN)	17.59 m	Chiara Rosa (ITA)	17.38 m
2016	Alena Abramchuk (BLR)	17.21 m	Jessica Cérival (FRA)	17.05 m	Markéta Červenková (CZE)	16.86 m
2017	Anita Márton (HUN)	18.05 m	Jessica Cérival (FRA)	17.50 m	Yuliya Leantsiuk (BLR)	17.48 m
2018	Anita Márton (HUN)	19.12 m	Aliona Dubitskaya (BLR)	18.47 m	Dimitriana Surdu (MDA)	18.45 m
2019	Fanny Roos (SWE)	18.44 m	Dimitriana Surdu (MDA)	17.99 m	Anita Márton (HUN)	17.85 m
2021	Sara Gambetta (DEU)	18.86 m	Aliona Dubitskaya (BLR)	18.79 m	Emel Dereli (TUR)	18.29 m
2022	Auriol Dongmo (POR)	19.68 m	Jessica Schilder (NED)	18.89 m	Fanny Roos (SWE)	18.64 m
2023	Jessica Inchude (PRT)	18.14 m	Yemisi Ogunleye (DEU)	18.09 m	Sara Lennman (SWE)	17.95 m
2024	Jessica Schilder (NED)	18.22 m	Julia Ritter (GER)	18.16 m	Eliana Bandeira (POR)	17.60 m
2025	Jessica Inchude (POR)	19.21 m	Katharina Maisch (GER)	18.58 m	María Belén Toimil (ESP)	17.37 m
2026	Katharina Maisch (GER)	18.32 m	Jessica Inchude (POR)	18.12 m	Eliana Bandeira (POR)	18.10 m

=== Discus throw (women) ===
Year	1st place, gold medalist(s)	Measure	2nd place, silver medalist(s)	Measure	3rd place, bronze medalist(s)	Measure
2001	Nicoleta Grasu (ROU)	65.52 m	Olena Antonova (UKR)	61.88 m	Mélina Robert-Michon (FRA)	61.67 m
2002	Valentina Ivanova (RUS)	60.28 m	Viktoriya Boyko (UKR)	60.07 m	Natalya Ampleyeva (RUS)	59.29 m
2003	Teresa Machado (POR)	63.65 m	Viktoriya Boyko (UKR)	60.63 m	Styliani Tsikouna (GRE)	59.73 m
2004	Franka Dietzsch (GER)	60.32 m	Natalya Sadova (RUS)	60.28 m	Mélina Robert-Michon (FRA)	58.69 m
2005	Natalya Sadova (RUS)	61.74 m	Nicoleta Grasu (ROU)	60.75 m	Jana Tucholke (GER)	57.84 m
2006	Wioletta Potępa (POL)	61.89 m	Oksana Esipchuk (RUS)	61.70 m	Nicoleta Grasu (RUS)	60.86 m
2007	Franka Dietzsch (GER)	66.15 m	Mélina Robert-Michon (FRA)	63.48 m	Natalia Semenova (UKR)	60.51 m
2008	Nicoleta Grasu (ROU)	60.25 m	Mélina Robert-Michon (FRA)	59.93 m	Dragana Tomašević (SRB)	59.64 m
2009	Nicoleta Grasu (ROU)	62.61 m	Żaneta Glanc (POL)	60.45 m	Vera Begić (CRO)	59.27 m
2010	Nadine Müller (GER)	64.30 m	Żaneta Glanc (POL)	59.95 m	Nicoleta Grasu (ROU)	59.92 m
2011	Olesya Korotkova (RUS)	60.30 m	Nicoleta Grasu (ROU)	59.44 m	Vera Karmishina-Ganeeva (RUS)	57.45 m
2012	Nadine Müller (GER)	68.82 m	Darya Pishchalnikova (RUS)	63.86 m	Mélina Robert-Michon (FRA)	63.03 m
2013	Nadine Müller (GER)	66.69 m	Mélina Robert-Michon (FRA)	61.26 m	Dragana Tomašević (SRB)	61.12 m
2014	Mélina Robert-Michon (FRA)	64.20 m	Anna Rüh (GER)	63.21 m	Dragana Tomašević (SRB)	59.26 m
2015	Nadine Müller (GER)	65.27 m	Mélina Robert-Michon (FRA)	64.75 m	Irina Rodrigues (POR)	63.25 m
2016	Mélina Robert-Michon (FRA)	62.05 m	Pauline Pousse (FRA)	58.24 m	Eliška Staňková (CZE)	55.55 m
2017	Mélina Robert-Michon (FRA)	62.35 m	Dragana Tomašević (SRB)	59.60 m	Chrysoula Anagnostopoulou (GRE)	59.47 m
2018	Nadine Müller (GER)	60.42 m	Irina Rodrigues (POR)	60.39 m	Yuliya Maltseva (ANA)	59.59 m
2019	Shanice Craft (GER)	59.79 m	Nadine Müller (GER)	59.74 m	Irina Rodrigues (POR)	58.05 m
2021	Liliana Cá (POR)	62.80 m	Irina Rodrigues (POR)	62.79 m	Shanice Craft (GER)	62.05 m
2022	Daisy Osakue (ITA)	61.56 m	Lisa Brix Pedersen (DEN)	61.23 m	Liliana Cá (POR)	60.74 m
2023	Shanice Craft (GER)	64.88 m	Liliana Cá (POR)	64.32 m	Mélina Robert-Michon (FRA)	61.70 m
2024	Irina Rodrigues (POR)	66.60 m	Shanice Craft (GER)	63.70 m	Mélina Robert-Michon (FRA)	62.46 m
2025	Vanessa Kamga (SWE)	63.25 m	Liliana Cá (POR)	62.66 m	Marike Steinacker (GER)	61.57 m
2026	Daria Zabawska (POL)	62.27 m	Melina Robert-Michon (FRA)	60.03 m	Marike Steinacker (GER)	59.72 m

=== Hammer throw (women) ===
Year	1st place, gold medalist(s)	Measure	2nd place, silver medalist(s)	Measure	3rd place, bronze medalist(s)	Measure
2001	Olga Kuzenkova (RUS)	71.30 m	Manuela Montebrun (FRA)	69.72 m	Lorraine Shaw (GBR)	68.15 m
2002	Susanne Keil (GER)	66.54 m	Vânia Silva (POR)	65.46 m	Lorraine Shaw (GBR)	64.81 m
2003	Manuela Montebrun (FRA)	72.18 m	Mihaela Melinte (ROU)	69.24 m	Olga Kuzenkova (RUS)	66.25 m
2004	Andrea Bunjes (GER)	67.99 m	Shirley Webb (GBR)	67.52 m	Sini Latvala (FIN)	67.49 m
2005	Ivana Brkljačić (CRO)	71.00 m	Mihaela Melinte (ROU)	70.40 m	Olga Kuzenkova (RUS)	70.11 m
2006	Kamila Skolimowska (POL)	73.32 m	Gulfiya Khanafeyeva (RUS)	72.01 m	Manuela Montebrun (FRA)	70.29 m
2007	Manuela Montebrun (FRA)	72.65 m	Tatyana Lysenko (RUS)	72.05 m	Ester Balassini (ITA)	68.70 m
2008	Anita Włodarczyk (POL)	71.84 m	Betty Heidler (GER)	71.10 m	Kathrin Klaas (GER)	69.04 m
2009	Anita Włodarczyk (POL)	75.05 m	Betty Heidler (GER)	73.45 m	Silvia Salis (ITA)	71.77 m
2010	Betty Heidler (GER)	72.48 m	Silvia Salis (ITA)	69.43 m	Tatyana Lysenko (RUS)	69.11 m
2011	Tatyana Lysenko (RUS)	73.70 m	Betty Heidler (GER)	72.71 m	Zalina Petrivskaya (MDA)	71.96 m
2012	Tatyana Lysenko (RUS)	72.87 m	Stéphanie Falzon (FRA)	72.60 m	Kateřina Šafránková (CZE)	71.16 m
2013	Tatyana Lysenko (RUS)	71.54 m	Kathrin Klaas (GER)	71.07 m	Tracey Andersson (SWE)	70.82 m
2014	Joanna Fiodorow (POL)	72.70 m	Éva Orbán (HUN)	72.49 m	Kathrin Klaas (GER)	70.99 m
2015	Anna Bulgakova (RUS)	72.06 m	Joanna Fiodorow (POL)	70.90 m	Alexandra Tavernier (FRA)	70.45 m
2016	Zalina Petrivskaya (MDA)	72.58 m	Alexandra Tavernier (FRA)	70.79 m	Betty Heidler (GER)	69.83 m
2017	Alexandra Tavernier (FRA)	71.71 m	Kathrin Klaas (GER)	71.06 m	Ida Storm (SWE)	70.97 m
2018	Hanna Malyshchyk (BLR)	72.62 m	Alexandra Tavernier (FRA)	71.20 m	Malwina Kopron (POL)	69.54 m
2019	Hanna Malyshik (BLR)	74.95 m	Joanna Fiodorow (POL)	73.22 m	Iryna Klymets (UKR)	72.53 m
2021	Malwina Kopron (POL)	72.82 m	Anita Włodarczyk (POL)	72.37 m	Alexandra Tavernier (FRA)	70.55 m
2022	Alexandra Tavernier (FRA)	70.13 m	Laura Redondo (ESP)	69.72 m	Sara Fantini (ITA)	69.60 m
2023	Sara Fantini (ITA)	73.26 m	Bianca Ghelber (ROU)	71.52 m	Katrine Koch Jacobsen (DNK)	71.08 m
2024	Katrine Koch Jacobsen (DEN)	71.95 m	Bianca Ghelber (ROU)	71.66 m	Sara Fantini (ITA)	70.58 m
2025	Silja Kosonen (FIN)	77.07 m	Rose Loga (FRA)	72.87 m	Sara Fantini (ITA)	72.37 m
2026	Katrine Koch Jacobsen (DEN)	75.52 m	Nicola Tuthill (IRL)	72.48 m	Guðrún Karítas Hallgrímsdóttir (ISL)	71.41 m

=== Javelin throw (women) ===
Year	1st place, gold medalist(s)	Measure	2nd place, silver medalist(s)	Measure	3rd place, bronze medalist(s)	Measure
2001	Tatyana Shikolenko (RUS)	63.96 m	Ana Mirela Țermure (ROU)	62.49 m	Claudia Coslovich (ITA)	57.89 m
2002	Claudia Coslovich (ITA)	63.27 m	Valeriya Zabruskova (RUS)	62.69 m	Dörthe Friedrich (GER)	59.02 m
2003	Steffi Nerius (GER)	62.50 m	Oksana Gromova (RUS)	61.12 m	Yekaterina Ivakina (RUS)	60.42 m
2004	Valeriya Zabruskova (RUS)	63.84 m	Steffi Nerius (GER)	62.80 m	Yekaterina Ivakina (RUS)	61.34 m
2005	Steffi Nerius (GER)	61.01 m	Lada Chernova (RUS)	60.05 m	Mariya Abakumova (RUS)	59.06 m
2006	Mareike Rittweg (GER)	60.06 m	Lada Chernova (RUS)	59.15 m	Mercedes Chilla (ESP)	57.28 m
2007	Steffi Nerius (GER)	63.14 m	Goldie Sayers (GBR)	60.02 m	Zahra Bani (ITA)	58.95 m
2008	Goldie Sayers (GBR)	63.65 m	Martina Ratej (SLO)	63.16 m	Zahra Bani (ITA)	59.42 m
2009	Mariya Abakumova (RUS)	61.87 m	Moonika Aava (EST)	60.76 m	Ásdís Hjálmsdóttir (ISL)	60.42 m
2010	Martina Ratej (SVN)	65.96 m	Mariya Abakumova (RUS)	65.21 m	Linda Stahl (GER)	60.56 m
2011	Hanna Hatsko-Fedusova (UKR)	58.35 m	Esther Eisenlauer (GER)	56.99 m	Ásdís Hjálmsdóttir (ISL)	56.44 m
2012	Martina Ratej (SVN)	63.59 m	Goldie Sayers (GBR)	62.75 m	Marina Maksimova (RUS)	60.33 m
2013	Mariya Abakumova (RUS)	69.34 m	Vera Rebrik (UKR)	63.42 m	Linda Stahl (GER)	61.97 m
2014	Linda Stahl (GER)	61.20 m	Katharina Molitor (GER)	60.97 m	Martina Ratej (SVN)	59.57 m
2015	Martina Ratej (SVN)	62.43 m	Linda Stahl (GER)	62.12 m	Katharina Molitor (GER)	62.08 m
2016	Christin Hussong (GER)	61.80 m	Līna Mūze (LVA)	61.26 m	Ásdís Hjálmsdóttir (ISL)	59.53 m
2017	Martina Ratej (SLO)	60.66 m	Ásdís Hjálmsdóttir (ISL)	59.20 m	Christin Hussong (GER)	59.00 m
2018	Sigrid Borge (NOR)	62.42 m	Christin Hussong (GER)	60.02 m	Katharina Molitor (GER)	59.80 m
2019	Tatsiana Khaladovich (BLR)	65.89 m	Christin Hussong (GER)	65.47 m	Eda Tugsuz (TUR)	64.83 m
2021	Maria Andrejczyk (POL)	71.40 m	Christin Hussong (GER)	66.44 m	Tatsiana Khaladovich (BLR)	62.88 m
2022	Līna Mūze (LAT)	58.12 m	Victoria Hudson (AUT)	57.64 m	Marija Vučenović (SRB)	57.26 m
2023	Elina Tzengko (GRE)	63.65 m	Marija Vučenović (SRB)	60.56 m	Adriana Vilagoš (SRB)	59.83 m
2024	Marie-Therese Obst (NOR)	61.69 m	Adriana Vilagoš (SRB)	61.17 m	Eda Tuğsuz (TUR)	60.50 m
2025	Adriana Vilagoš (SRB)	66.88 m	Sigrid Borge (NOR)	62.62 m	Sara Kolak (CRO)	59.66 m
2026	Jade Maraval (FRA)	60.02 m	Adriana Vilagoš (SRB)	59.85 m	Paola Padovan (ITA)	58.69 m

== Medals ==
=== U23 (2007-2026) ===
148 Gold, 148 Silver, 148 Bronze

=== Senior (2001-2026) ===
196 Gold, 196 Silver, 196 Bronze

=== Total (2001-2026) ===
Rank	Nation	Gold	Silver	Bronze	Total
1	Germany (GER)	51	40	36	127
2	Russia (RUS)	34	30	32	96
3	Ukraine (UKR)	25	28	17	70
4	Belarus (BLR)	21	24	18	63
5	Hungary (HUN)	20	24	9	53
6	France (FRA)	20	22	19	61
7	Poland (POL)	20	15	9	44
8	Turkey (TUR)	17	5	19	41
9	Romania (ROU)	13	16	11	40
10	Italy (ITA)	12	18	33	63
11	Sweden (SWE)	12	12	9	33
12	Slovenia (SLO)	11	7	4	22
13	Croatia (CRO)	10	4	9	23
14	Portugal (POR)	9	15	11	35
15	Estonia (EST)	9	3	8	20
16	Netherlands (NED)	8	8	13	29
17	Norway (NOR)	7	4	5	16
18	Spain (ESP)	6	11	13	30
19	Serbia (SRB)	5	6	6	17
20	Latvia (LAT)	5	4	2	11
21	Great Britain (GBR)	4	9	7	20
22	Finland (FIN)	4	5	10	19
23	Moldova (MDA)	4	3	6	13
24	Greece (GRE)	3	6	12	21
25	Czech Republic (CZE)	3	3	5	11
26	Bosnia and Herzegovina (BIH)	3	1	4	8
27	Montenegro (MNE)	3	1	0	4
28	Authorised Neutral Athletes (ANA)	2	2	2	6
29	Denmark (DEN)	2	1	5	8
30	Kosovo (KOS)	2	1	0	3
31	Belgium (BEL)	2	0	2	4
32	Ireland (IRL)	1	4	2	7
33	Lithuania (LTU)	1	3	3	7
34	Austria (AUT)	1	3	0	4
34	Cyprus (CYP)	1	3	0	4
36	Georgia (GEO)	1	0	0	1
37	Iceland (ISL)	0	5	5	10
38	Bulgaria (BUL)	0	2	1	3
38	Switzerland (SUI)	0	2	1	3
40	Slovakia (SVK)	0	1	2	3
41	Luxembourg (LUX)	0	1	1	2
42	Armenia (ARM)	0	0	1	1
Totals (42 entries)		352	352	352	1,056
