= 2002 European Athletics Championships – Women's shot put =

Women's shot put at the European Athletics Championships

These are the official results of the Women's shot put event at the 2002 European Championships in Munich, Germany. There were a total number of fifteen participating athletes. There was no qualification round. The final was held on Saturday August 10, 2002.

== Medalists ==
Gold	Irina Korzhanenko; Russia (RUS)
Silver	Vita Pavlysh; Ukraine (UKR)
Bronze	Svetlana Krivelyova; Russia (RUS)

== Schedule ==
- All times are Central European Time (UTC+1)

Qualification Round
Group A	Group B
—	—
Final Round
10.08.2002 – ??:??

== Abbreviations ==
- All results shown are in metres

Q	automatic qualification
q	qualification by rank
DNS	did not start
NM	no mark
WR	world record
AR	area record
NR	national record
PB	personal best
SB	season best

== Records ==
Standing records prior to the 2002 European Athletics Championships
World Record	Natalya Lisovskaya (URS)	22.63 m	June 7, 1987	Moscow, Soviet Union
Event Record	Vita Pavlysh (UKR)	21.69 m	August 20, 1998	Budapest, Hungary

== Final ==
Rank	Athlete	Attempts						Distance	Note
Rank	Athlete	1	2	3	4	5	6	Distance	Note
1st place, gold medalist(s)	Irina Korzhanenko (RUS)	19.91	20.26	20.64	19.98	X	X	20.64 m	
2nd place, silver medalist(s)	Vita Pavlysh (UKR)	20.02	X	X	X	18.97	X	20.02 m	
3rd place, bronze medalist(s)	Svetlana Krivelyova (RUS)	17.63	18.97	19.08	19.56	X	X	19.56 m	
4	Astrid Kumbernuss (GER)	19.06	X	18.78	18.88	19.22	X	19.22 m	
5	Nadezhda Ostapchuk (BLR)	X	18.29	18.85	X	19.07	X	19.07 m	
6	Nadine Kleinert (GER)	18.39	18.14	X	18.68	X	18.53	18.68 m	
7	Krystyna Zabawska (POL)	17.32	18.07	18.63	18.06	18.43	18.17	18.63 m	
8	Assunta Legnante (ITA)	17.85	18.23	X	18.00	X	18.00	18.23 m	
9	Nadine Beckel (GER)	18.18	17.95	17.98				18.18 m	
10	Lieja Tunks (NED)	17.44	17.51	17.54				17.54 m	
11	Elena Hila (ROM)	16.91	17.41	X				17.41 m	
12	Kalliopi Ouzouni (GRE)	17.38	17.00	X				17.38 m	
13	Valentina Fedjuschina (AUT)							17.11 m	
14	Cristiana Checchi (ITA)							15.81 m	
15	Sevda Kalkan (TUR)							14.63 m	

== See also ==
- 1999 Women's World Championships Shot Put (Seville)
- 2000 Women's Olympic Shot Put (Sydney)
- 2001 Women's World Championships Shot Put (Edmonton)
- 2002 Shot Put Year Ranking
- 2003 Women's World Championships Shot Put (Paris)
- 2004 Women's Olympic Shot Put (Athens)
- 2005 Women's World Championships Shot Put (Helsinki)
