= 2002 European Winter Throwing Challenge =

2002 European Throwing Cup
- Events: 8

The 2002 European Winter Throwing Challenge was held on 9 and 10 March at Stadion Veruda in Pula, Croatia. It was the second edition of the athletics competition for throwing events organised by the European Athletics Association. A total of 175 athletes from 26 countries entered the competition, an increase on the inaugural edition the previous year.

The competition featured men's and women's contests in shot put, discus throw, javelin throw and hammer throw. Athletes were seeded into "A" and "B" groups in several events due to the number of entries. Rutger Smith of the Netherlands defied his seeding in both the shot put and discus, managing to reach the overall podium in the events despite being in the weaker "B" group.

== Medal summary ==
=== Men ===
Event	Gold		Silver		Bronze	
Shot put	Manuel Martínez Gutiérrez (ESP)	20.92 m	Rutger Smith (NED)	19.85 m	Leszek Śliwa (POL)	19.78 m
Discus throw	David Martínez (ESP)	63.09 m	Aleksandr Borichevskiy (RUS)	61.72 m	Rutger Smith (NED)	61.68 m
Javelin throw	Alexandr Ivanov (RUS)	81.71 m	Stefan Wenk (GER)	78.46 m	Marián Bokor (SVK)	76.91 m
Hammer throw	Aleksey Zagornyi (RUS)	82.27 m	Alexandros Papadimitriou (GRE)	79.67 m	Miloslav Konopka (SVK)	78.58 m

=== Women ===
Event	Gold		Silver		Bronze	
Shot put	Vita Pavlysh (UKR)	20.03 m	Assunta Legnante (ITA)	18.15 m	Irina Khudoroshkina (RUS)	17.88 m
Discus throw	Valentina Ivanova (RUS)	60.28 m	Viktoriya Boyko (UKR)	60.07 m	Natalya Ampleyeva (RUS)	59.29 m
Javelin throw	Claudia Coslovich (ITA)	63.27 m	Valeriya Zabruskova (RUS)	62.69 m	Dörthe Friedrich (GER)	59.02 m
Hammer throw	Susanne Keil (GER)	66.54 m	Vânia Silva (POR)	65.46 m	Lorraine Shaw (GBR)	64.81 m

== Medal and points table ==
* Host nation (Croatia)

Rank	Nation	Gold	Silver	Bronze	Total
1	Russia (RUS)	3	2	2	7
2	Spain (ESP)	2	0	0	2
3	Germany (GER)	1	1	1	3
4	Italy (ITA)	1	1	0	2
4	Ukraine (UKR)	1	1	0	2
6	Netherlands (NED)	0	1	1	2
7	Greece (GRE)	0	1	0	1
7	Portugal (POR)	0	1	0	1
9	Slovakia (SVK)	0	0	2	2
10	Great Britain (GBR)	0	0	1	1
10	Poland (POL)	0	0	1	1
12	Croatia (CRO)*	0	0	0	0
12	France (FRA)	0	0	0	0
Totals (13 entries)		8	8	8	24

== Participation ==
- Bosnia and Herzegovina and the Republic of Macedonia entered several athletes, but none attended the competition. San Marino entered one athlete (Gabriele Mazza), but he did not compete.
- Austria
- Croatia
- Estonia
- Finland
- France
- Germany
- Great Britain
- Greece
- Israel
- Italy
- Netherlands
- Poland
- Portugal
- Romania
- Russia
- Slovenia
- Spain
- Switzerland
- Slovakia
- Sweden
- Turkey
- Ukraine
