= 2006 European Cup Winter Throwing =

2006 European Throwing Cup
- Events: 8

Official logo

The 2006 European Cup Winter Throwing was held on 18 and 19 March at Hadar Yosef Stadium in Tel Aviv, Israel. It was the sixth edition of the athletics competition for throwing events organised by the European Athletics Association. A total of 168 athletes from 28 countries entered the competition.

The competition featured men's and women's contests in shot put, discus throw, javelin throw and hammer throw. Athletes were seeded into "A" and "B" groups in each competition.

Polish and Russian athletes dominated the proceedings. Poland won five of the eight contests while Russia provided the silver medallist in six events. Russia was the winner in the men's and women's team points competition.

Andrei Mikhnevich of Belarus was the original winner of the shot put (and a frequent world medallist during the period). In 2013 all his results from August 2005 onwards were annulled after a retest of his doping sample from the 2005 World Championships in Athletics proved to be positive, resulting in a lifetime ban for the athlete. Romania's Gheorghe Guşet was promoted to first place in the European Cup field.

== Medal summary ==
Men
Event	Gold		Silver		Bronze	
Shot put	Gheorghe Guşet (ROM)	20.41 m	Tomasz Majewski (POL)	20.26 m	Pavel Sofin (RUS)	20.19 m
Discus throw	Piotr Małachowski (POL)	65.01 m	Mario Pestano (ESP)	63.40 m	Gerd Kanter (EST)	62.55 m
Javelin throw	Igor Janik (POL)	81.16 m	Vladislav Shkurlatov (RUS)	79.27 m	Ainārs Kovals (LAT)	78.64 m
Hammer throw	Szymon Ziółkowski (POL)	79.04 m	Vadim Khersontsev (RUS)	78.54 m	Dzmitry Shako (BLR)	77.00 m
WR world record | AR area record | CR championship record | GR games record | NR national record | OR Olympic record | PB personal best | SB season best | WL world leading (in a given season)

Women
Event	Gold		Silver		Bronze	
Shot put	Natallia Mikhnevich (BLR)	19.18 m	Olga Ryabinkina (RUS)	18.55 m	Nadine Kleinert (GER)	18.30 m
Discus throw	Wioletta Potępa (POL)	61.89 m	Oksana Esipchuk (RUS)	61.70 m	Nicoleta Grasu (ROM)	60.86 m
Javelin throw	Mareike Rittweg (GER)	60.06 m	Lada Chernova (RUS)	59.15 m	Mercedes Chilla (ESP)	57.28 m
Hammer throw	Kamila Skolimowska (POL)	73.32 m	Gulfiya Khanafeyeva (RUS)	72.01 m	Manuela Montebrun (FRA)	70.29 m

== Medal and points table ==
Key

The host country is highlighted in lavender blue

1	Poland	5	1	0	6	7662	—
2	Russia	0	6	1	7	8531	8178
3=	Belarus	1	0	1	2	5281^{[a]}	6137
3=	Germany	1	0	1	2	7339	—
5	Romania	1	0	0	1	4980	7732
6	Spain	0	1	1	2	—	6451
7=	Estonia	0	0	1	1	6533	—
7=	France	0	0	1	1	5020	7593
7=	Latvia	0	0	1	1	—	—
10=	Italy	0	0	0	0	7981	7834
10=	Israel	0	0	0	0	6428	3611
10=	Ukraine	0	0	0	0	5069	4956

- ^{a} Belarus's score in the men's team competition was originally 5373 points. Following Andrei Mikhnevich's disqualification in 2013, his points total of 1157 was replaced by that of his countryman Yury Bialou who was ninth with 1065 points.
