= 2003 European Winter Throwing Challenge =

2003 European Throwing Cup
- Events: 8

The 2003 European Winter Throwing Challenge was held on 1 and 2 March at Stadio Polivalente Gioia Tauro in Gioia Tauro, Italy. It was the third edition of the athletics competition for throwing events organised by the European Athletics Association. A total of 137 athletes from 24 countries entered the competition.

The competition featured men's and women's contests in shot put, discus throw, javelin throw and hammer throw. Several events were split into two groups due to the number of entries. Russia and Germany were the top performing nations at the competition. Russia won the women's division on points and had the largest medal haul with one gold, four silver and three bronze medals. Germany topped the men's points table and was the only nation to win two gold medals at the challenge. The host nation, Italy, ranked third in both the men's and women's categories.

Three medallists in Gioia Tauro went on to reach the podium at the 2003 World Championships in Athletics. Women's hammer throwers Manuela Montebrun and Olga Kuzenkova were world bronze and silver medallists, respectively, while Steffi Nerius (women's javelin winner at this competition) took the bronze on the global stage.

== Medal summary ==
=== Men ===
Event	Gold		Silver		Bronze	
Shot put	Rutger Smith (NED)	20.52 m	Ivan Yushkov (RUS)	19.54 m	Peter Sack (GER)	19.53 m
Discus throw	Gerd Kanter (EST)	64.17 m	Mario Pestano (ESP)	63.71 m	Ionel Oprea (ROM)	62.29 m
Javelin throw	Christian Nicolay (GER)	83.80 m	Alexandr Ivanov (RUS)	79.24 m	Dominique Pausé (FRA)	78.60 m
Hammer throw	Nicola Vizzoni (ITA)	75.35 m	Alexandros Papadimitriou (GRE)	74.74 m	Ilya Konovalov (RUS)	74.73 m

=== Women ===
Event	Gold		Silver		Bronze	
Shot put	Irina Khudoroshkina (RUS)	18.47 m	Anna Romanova (RUS)	18.09 m	Cristiana Checchi (ITA)	17.91 m
Discus throw	Teresa Machado (POR)	63.65 m	Viktoriya Boyko (UKR)	60.63 m	Styliani Tsikouna (GRE)	59.73 m
Javelin throw	Steffi Nerius (GER)	62.50 m	Oksana Gromova (RUS)	61.12 m	Yekaterina Ivakina (RUS)	60.42 m
Hammer throw	Manuela Montebrun (FRA)	72.18 m	Mihaela Melinte (ROM)	69.24 m	Olga Kuzenkova (RUS)	66.25 m

== Medal and points table ==
Key

The host country is highlighted in lavender blue

1	Germany	2	0	1	3	8482	7885
2	Russia	1	4	3	8	8296	8238
3=	France	1	0	1	2	6177	3149
3=	Italy	1	0	1	2	8161	7882
5=	Estonia	1	0	0	1	—N/a	—N/a
5=	Netherlands	1	0	0	1	—N/a	—N/a
5=	Portugal	1	0	0	1	2842	3933
8=	Greece	0	1	1	2	3053	—N/a
8=	Romania	0	1	1	2	3213	—N/a
10=	Spain	0	1	0	1	4104	2856
10=	Ukraine	0	1	0	1	3941	7705
12=	Great Britain	0	0	0	0	—N/a	4599
12=	Poland	0	0	0	0	3193	—N/a
12=	Sweden	0	0	0	0	—N/a	3318
12=	Turkey	0	0	0	0	3853	—N/a

== Participation ==
- Austria
- Belgium
- Croatia
- Czech Republic
- Estonia
- Finland
- France
- Germany
- Great Britain
- Greece
- Ireland
- Iceland
- Italy
- Netherlands
- Poland
- Portugal
- Romania
- Russia
- Slovenia
- Spain
- Switzerland
- Sweden
- Turkey
- Ukraine
