= Yesipchuk =

Yesipchuk or Esipchuk (Russian: Есипчук) is a gender-neutral surname. Notable people with the surname include:

- Dmitry Yesipchuk (born 1974), Russian race walker
- Oksana Esipchuk (born 1976), Russian discus thrower
