= 2004 European Winter Throwing Challenge =

2004 European Throwing Cup
- Events: 8

The 2004 European Winter Throwing Challenge was held on 13 and 14 March at St. John Athletic Stadium in Marsa, Malta. It was the fourth edition of the athletics competition for throwing events organised by the European Athletics Association. The 2004 event was the last to use the challenge name, as subsequent editions were known as European Cup Winter Throwing events. A total of 147 athletes from 28 countries entered the competition.

The competition featured men's and women's contests in shot put, discus throw, javelin throw and hammer throw. Athletes were seeded into "A" and "B" groups in each competition. Russia topped the points table in the women's and men's division of the team competition. With four medals, it shared the greatest medal haul alongside Germany, which was runner-up in the points table but was the only nation to have two winners from the eight events on offer.

The host nation, Malta, had only one athlete at the event – men's javelin thrower Jean Paul Callus. Callus broke the Maltese record with his opening throw, recording a new best mark of 59.93 m (196 ft 7 1/4 in) for his country. The weather was not conducive to high standard performances and Callus gave the sole record performance of the challenge.

Five athletes went on to take medals at the 2004 Athens Olympics: Eşref Apak was a bronze medallist, Vadims Vasiļevskis, Nadine Kleinert and Steffi Nerius took Olympic silver, and Natalya Sadova became the Olympic champion in women's discus. Despite going on to this success, among these only Vasiļevskis was a winner in the European Winter Throwing Challenge.

== Medal summary ==
=== Men ===
Event	Gold		Silver		Bronze	
Shot put	Rutger Smith (NED)	20.23 m	Miran Vodovnik (SLO)	19.65 m	Grigoriy Panfilov (RUS)	19.43 m
Discus throw	Gerd Kanter (EST)	63.21 m	Mario Pestano (ESP)	62.00 m	Rutger Smith (NED)	59.84 m
Javelin throw	Vadims Vasiļevskis (LAT)	82.44 m	Ainārs Kovals (LAT)	82.13 m	Teemu Wirkkala (FIN)	80.87 m
Hammer throw	Krisztián Pars (HUN)	79.69 m	Eşref Apak (TUR)	77.76 m	Alexandros Papadimitriou (GRE)	77.13 m
WR world record | AR area record | CR championship record | GR games record | NR national record | OR Olympic record | PB personal best | SB season best | WL world leading (in a given season)

=== Women ===
Event	Gold		Silver		Bronze	
Shot put	Vita Pavlysh (UKR)	19.39 m	Nadine Kleinert (GER)	18.17 m	Assunta Legnante (ITA)	17.96 m
Discus throw	Franka Dietzsch (GER)	60.32 m	Natalya Sadova (RUS)	60.28 m	Mélina Robert-Michon (FRA)	58.69 m
Javelin throw	Valeriya Zabruskova (RUS)	63.84 m	Steffi Nerius (GER)	62.80 m	Yekaterina Ivakina (RUS)	61.34 m
Hammer throw	Andrea Bunjes (GER)	67.99 m	Shirley Webb (GBR)	67.52 m	Sini Latvala (FIN)	67.49 m

== Medal and points table ==
Rank	Nation	Gold	Silver	Bronze	Total
1	Germany (GER)	2	2	0	4
2	Russia (RUS)	1	1	2	4
3	Latvia (LAT)	1	1	0	2
4	Netherlands (NED)	1	0	1	2
5	Estonia (EST)	1	0	0	1
5	Hungary (HUN)	1	0	0	1
5	Ukraine (UKR)	1	0	0	1
8	Great Britain (GBR)	0	1	0	1
8	Slovenia (SLO)	0	1	0	1
8	Spain (ESP)	0	1	0	1
8	Turkey (TUR)	0	1	0	1
12	Finland (FIN)	0	0	2	2
13	France (FRA)	0	0	1	1
13	Greece (GRE)	0	0	1	1
13	Italy (ITA)	0	0	1	1
16	Belarus (BLR)	0	0	0	0
Totals (16 entries)		8	8	8	24

- Team points given for nations with at least three athletes in a gender category

== Participation ==
- Albania
- Austria
- Azerbaijan
- Belgium
- Belarus
- Croatia
- Czech Republic
- Estonia
- Finland
- France
- Germany
- Great Britain
- Greece
- Hungary
- Italy
- Latvia
- Malta
- Netherlands
- Poland
- Portugal
- Romania
- Russia
- Slovenia
- Spain
- Switzerland
- Sweden
- Turkey
- Ukraine
