= Gerd Kanter =

Estonian discus thrower (born 1979)

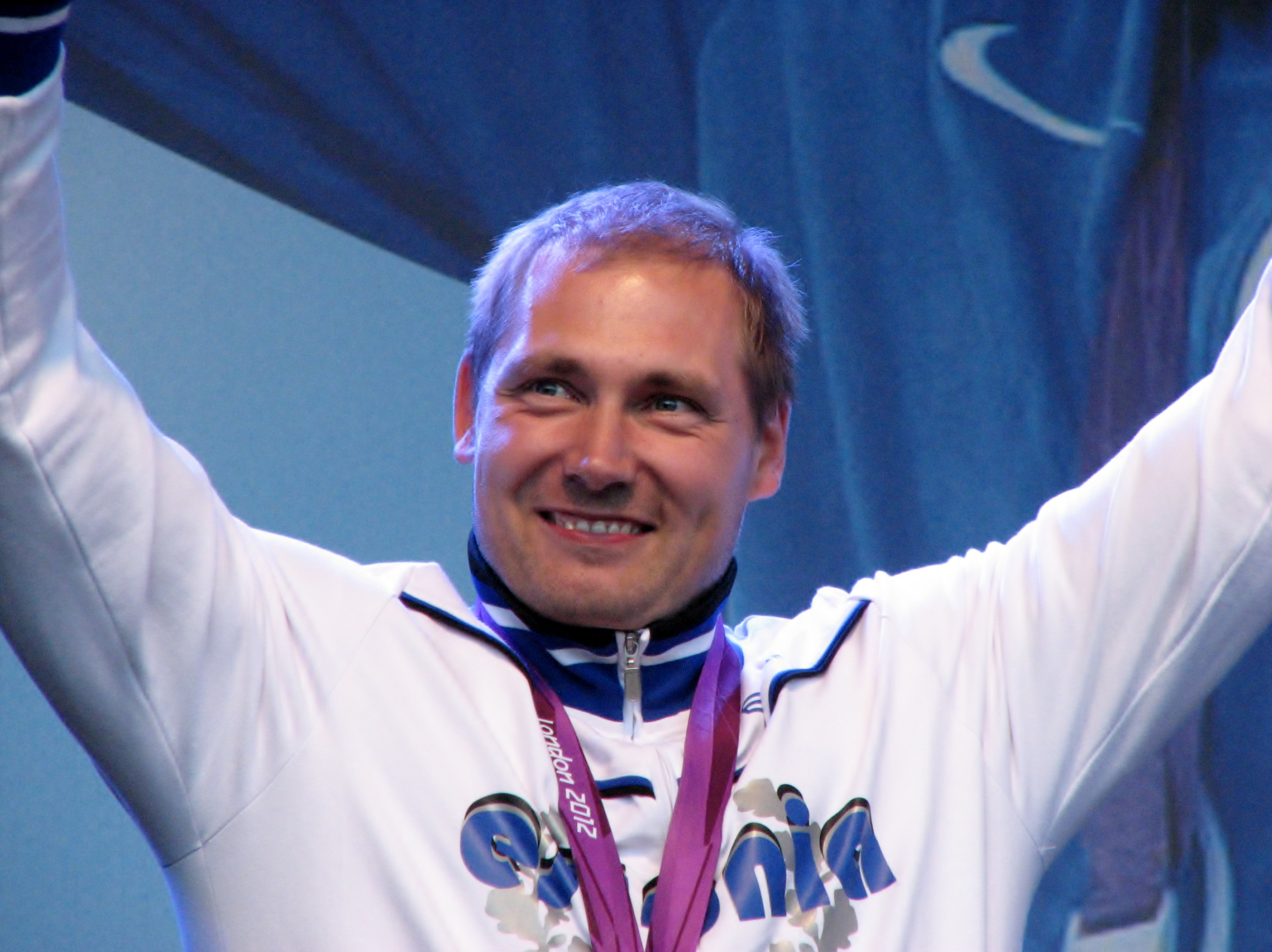

Personal information
- Nationality: Estonian
- Born: 6 May 1979 (age 47) Tallinn, then part of Estonian SSR, Soviet Union
- Height: 1.96 m (6 ft 5 in)
- Weight: 127 kg (280 lb)

Sport
- Country: Estonia
- Sport: Athletics
- Event: Discus

Achievements and titles
- Personal best: 73.38 m (2006)
Medal record
Event	1st	2nd	3rd
Olympic Games	1	0	1
World Championships	1	2	2
European Championships	0	3	1
Continental Cup	1	0	0
European Throwing Cup	6	0	1
Universiade	1	0	0
Total	10	5	5
Olympic Games
Gold medal – first place	2008 Beijing	Discus
Bronze medal – third place	2012 London	Discus
World Championships
Gold medal – first place	2007 Osaka	Discus
Silver medal – second place	2005 Helsinki	Discus
Silver medal – second place	2011 Daegu	Discus
Bronze medal – third place	2009 Berlin	Discus
Bronze medal – third place	2013 Moscow	Discus
European Championships
Silver medal – second place	2006 Gothenburg	Discus
Silver medal – second place	2012 Helsinki	Discus
Silver medal – second place	2014 Zurich	Discus
Bronze medal – third place	2016 Amsterdam	Discus
Continental Cup
Gold medal – first place	2014 Marrakesh	Discus
European Throwing Cup
Gold medal – first place	2003 Gioia Tauro	Discus
Gold medal – first place	2004 Marsa	Discus
Gold medal – first place	2005 Mersin	Discus
Gold medal – first place	2007 Yalta	Discus
Gold medal – first place	2008 Split	Discus
Gold medal – first place	2009 Tenerife	Discus
Bronze medal – third place	2006 Tel Aviv	Discus
Universiade
Gold medal – first place	2005 İzmir	Discus

Gerd Kanter (born 6 May 1979) is an Estonian retired discus thrower. He was the 2007 World Champion in the event and won the gold medal at the 2008 Summer Olympics, and bronze in London 2012. His personal best throw of 73.38 m is the Estonian record and the fourth best mark of all time.

He made his first Olympic appearance in 2004 and established himself a year later by taking the silver medal at the 2005 World Championships. He was runner-up at the 2006 European Athletics Championships and won further medals at the World Championships in 2009 (bronze) and 2011 (silver).

He won the 2012 and the 2013 IAAF Diamond League in discus throw.

== Career ==
He competed at the 2004 Olympics, but did not reach the final. The season 2005 was his breakthrough year as he won silver medals at the World Championships and World Athletics Final, took home a victory in the European Cup and won the World University Games. He also threw more than 70 metres for the first time.

On 4 September 2006 in Helsingborg, Sweden, Kanter threw more than 70 metres in four different rounds (69.46 – 72.30 – 70.43 – 73.38 – 70.51 – 65.88). The best mark of 73.38 m was an Estonian record and the third best in history – only Jürgen Schult (74.08 m, 1986) and Virgilijus Alekna (73.88 m, 2000) had thrown further.

Kanter was the silver medalist at the 2006 European Athletics Championships, finishing behind Virgilijus Alekna, and became the world champion in the discus at the 2007 World Championships in Athletics in Osaka. At the 2008 Beijing Olympics, he took the Olympic gold medal with a throw of 68.82 meters, one meter ahead of second-place finisher Piotr Małachowski of Poland.

In March 2009 he won the European Cup Winter Throwing event in Los Realejos, Tenerife, Spain with 69.70 m. On 22 March 2009, he set a world indoor best of 69.51 m in Växjö, Sweden. At the 2009 World Championships in Athletics he returned to defend his world title. He had a best throw of 66.88 m, which was enough for the World bronze medal. He took victory in the Wexiö Indoor Throwing competition in 2010, although his winning throw was some way behind his indoor record set the previous year. Still, he started strongly outdoors, having a long early-season throw of 71.45 m in California – the eleventh best throw ever at that point.

He finished just outside the medals at the 2010 European Athletics Championships, coming fourth, but managed to win the silver medal at the 2011 World Championships in Athletics behind Robert Harting. He ended that year with a season's best throw of 67.99 m at the Kamila Skolimowska Memorial.

He retired from competition after the 2018 season.

== Achievements ==
Year	Competition	Venue	Position	Result
Representing Estonia
2001	European U23 Championships	Amsterdam, Netherlands	5th	57.73 m
2002	European Championships	Munich, Germany	12th	55.14 m
2003	European Throwing Cup	Gioia Tauro, Italy	1st	64.17 m
2003	World Championships	Paris, France	25th (q)	56.63 m
2004	European Throwing Cup	Marsa, Malta	1st	63.21 m
2004	Olympic Games	Athens, Greece	19th (q)	60.05 m
2004	World Athletics Final	Monte Carlo, Monaco	5th	63.28 m
2005	European Throwing Cup	Mersin, Turkey	1st	66.05 m
2005	World Championships	Helsinki, Finland	2nd	68.57 m
2005	Universiade	İzmir, Turkey	1st	65.29 m
2005	World Athletics Final	Monte Carlo, Monaco	2nd	66.01 m
2006	European Throwing Cup	Tel Aviv, Israel	3rd	62.55 m
2006	European Championships	Gothenburg, Sweden	2nd	68.03 m
2006	World Athletics Final	Stuttgart, Germany	2nd	68.47 m
2007	European Throwing Cup	Yalta, Ukraine	1st	65.43 m
2007	World Championships	Osaka, Japan	1st	68.94 m
2007	World Athletics Final	Stuttgart, Germany	1st	66.54 m
2008	European Throwing Cup	Split, Croatia	1st	65.25 m
2008	Olympic Games	Beijing, China	1st	68.82 m
2008	World Athletics Final	Stuttgart, Germany	1st	68.38 m
2009	European Throwing Cup	Tenerife, Spain	1st	69.70 m
2009	World Championships	Berlin, Germany	3rd	66.88 m
2010	European Championships	Barcelona, Spain	4th	66.20 m
2011	World Championships	Daegu, South Korea	2nd	66.95 m
2012	European Championships	Helsinki, Finland	2nd	66.53 m
2012	Olympic Games	London, United Kingdom	3rd	68.03 m
2013	World Championships	Moscow, Russia	3rd	65.19 m
2014	European Championships	Zurich, Switzerland	2nd	64.75 m
2014	Continental Cup	Marrakesh, Morocco	1st	64.46 m
2015	World Championships	Beijing, China	4th	64.82 m
2016	European Championships	Amsterdam, Netherlands	3rd	65.27 m
2016	Olympic Games	Rio de Janeiro, Brazil	5th	65.10 m
2017	World Championships	London, United Kingdom	12th	60.00 m
2018	European Championships	Berlin, Germany	5th	64.34 m

== Honours ==
- Estonian Sportsman of the Year: 2007, 2008, 2011
- European Athlete of the Month: April 2009, April 2010, September 2014

=== Orders ===
Order of the Estonian Red Cross, 1st Class: 2009
Order of the White Star, 4th Class: 2006

Awards
Preceded by Andrus Veerpalu; Nikolai Novosjolov	Estonian Sportsman of the Year; 2007, 2008; 2011	Succeeded by Andrus Veerpalu; Heiki Nabi
