= Marco Lingua =

Italian hammer thrower (born 1978)

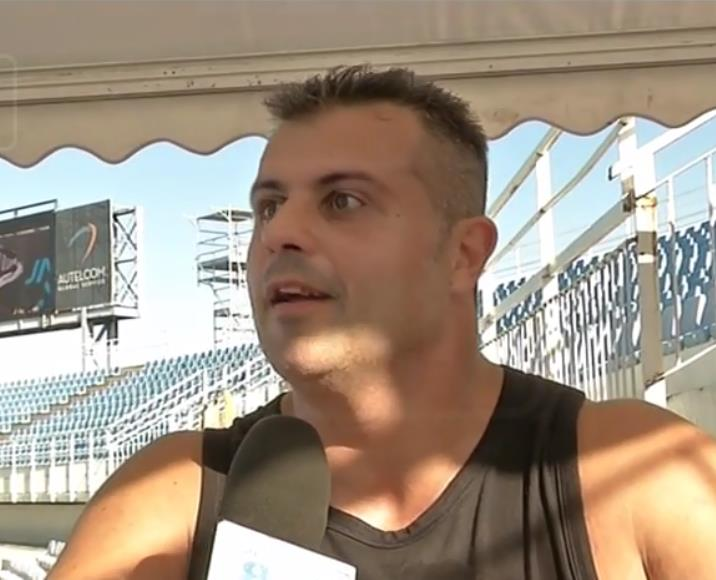
- Lingua in 2018.

Personal information
- Nationality: Italian
- Born: 4 June 1978 (age 48) Chivasso, Italy
- Height: 1.79 m (5 ft 10 1/2 in)
- Weight: 94 kg (207 lb)

Sport
- Country: Italy
- Sport: Athletics
- Event: Hammer throw
- Club: Marco Lingua 4ever

Achievements and titles
- Personal best: Hammer throw: 79.97 m (2008)
Medal record
European Cup Winter Throwing
Gold medal – first place	2008 Split	Hammer throw
Silver medal – second place	2009 Los Realejos	Hammer throw
Bronze medal – third place	2016 Arad	Hammer throw
World Military Championships
Silver medal – second place	2009 Sofia	Hammer throw

Marco Lingua (born 4 June 1978 in Chivasso, Piedmont) is an Italian hammer thrower, writer, actor, TV personality and former weightlifter. He finished eleventh at the 2006 European Championships. He also competed at the 2008 Olympic Games without reaching the final. His personal best throw is 79.97 metres, achieved in July 2008 in Bydgoszcz. For the results of the races in detail see the displayboards below.

== Biography ==
=== Sport activity: Militancy Societies ===
He started practicing athletics in 1994 at the age of 16, category Allievi, with a company in his hometown, the Chivassesi Sports Group. He then served in CUS Torino, in the Italian Air Force and from 1998 to 2014 in the Polisportiva Libertas Oranfresh Catania. He then moved on to the Fiamme Gialle with whom he competed from 1999 to 2014; in 2015 he was registered for Atletica Sandro Calvesi of Aosta and from 2016 he competed for ASD Marco Lingua 4ever by Mazzè.

=== Sport activity: Titles and Participations ===
In 1995 he won his first Italian youth title under 18. During the two-year juniors, 1996–1997, he doubles Italian under-20 titles. Also in 1997 he arrived seventh at the Junior European Championships in Ljubljana (Slovenia). The year 1998 sees him win three medals in the hammer at the Italian championships: silver promises of winter launches, gold under 23 and bronze to the absolutes of Rome. In the same year he also won the Italian junior weightlifting title.

In 1999 he won three medals at the Italian championships: gold under 23 and absolute bronze at the winter of pitches, gold at the national promises and bronze at the absolutes of Pescara. Participate in the under 23 European Championships in Gothenburg (Sweden) but remain out of the final. On 9 October, in Macerata, he signed the new best Italian performance Promesse with 76.72 m, beating the previous record of 75.60 m held by Loris Paoluzzi since 1996.

In 2000 Italian champion reconfirmed promises both to the winter of launches and the championships of the category; on the other hand, the absolute ends fourth at the winter of launches and conquers the bronze at the absolute of Milan.

In 2001 he won two bronzes, one for the winter of pitches and the other for the absolutes of Catania; he also graduates the absolute Italian champion of weightlifting in his category of +105 kg.

In 2002 he became the absolute Italian weightlifting champion (+105 kg category), bronze and absolute silver respectively for the winter launches and the Viareggio absolutes.

In 2003 he made his debut with the national team of the National seniors in the European Winter Cup of launches held in Italy in Gioia Tauro, the city where he had become the same year, for the first time in his career, Italian absolute runner-up in the winter launches; always at the national championships he reaches sixth in the cast of weight for indoor absolutes and wins the bronze at the Rieti absolutes. He competes, also in Italy, also at the Catania World Championships, finishing in seventh place.

During the two-year period 2004–2005 he finished sixth in Spain at the Mediterranean Games of Almería 2005 and, in the same year, eighth in the European Winter Cup of launches in Mersin (Turkey); at the absolute Italian championships instead he becomes vicevampione in Florence 2004 and then he graduates absolute champion to the winter of launches in 2005 (fourth to the absolute of Bressanone).

Year 2006: 11th at the Gothenburg European Championships in Sweden, eighth in Israel in Tel-Aviv in the specialty winter European Cup; gold to the winter of pitches and silver to the absolute of Turin, still silver even to the absolute weightlifting (did not compete with the Italian seniors of weights).

Year 2007: champion for both the absolute winter of pitches (no valid measure for the absolutes of Padua) and the absolute weightlifting (after the victory in the national seniors), second classified in France at the DécaNation of Paris and eighth in the Winter European Cup of launches in Yalta (Ukraine).

2008 is the year of his first Olympic Games: he takes part in China at the Olympic Games in Beijing, but he does three qualifying laps. Also in the international arena, he won the European Winter Cup for launches in Split, Croatia. In Italy he graduated as an absolute champion both in Cagliari (silver at the winter of one-quarter throws from the champion Vizzoni) and in the weightlifting (gold medal also for the Italian seniors).

Year 2009: Wins the silver medal in both the Winter European Cup of launches in Los Realejos (Spain) and the World Cup in Sofia (Bulgaria); in Italy at the Mediterranean Games in Pescara he made three throws in the final ended in 11th place. In the national championships he obtains three silver medals: winter of pitches, absolute of Milan and absolute weight lifting (he does not compete instead with the Italian seniors).

Year 2010: Absolute vice-champion both for the winter of specialties and for the absolute ones of Grosseto and seniors champion of weightlifting (silver medal for the absolute ones). He became the absolute vice-champion in Turin in 2011; while in winter the specialty does not make valid launches and instead the Italian weightlifting championships do not compete for seniors or absolutes.

The 2012 sees him present in Finland at the Europeans in Helsinki where he can not access the final; also at the Italian championships wins silver at the winter and bronze at the absolutes of Bressanone.

Year 2013: Wins a bronze and a silver respectively to the winter of launches and the absolutes of Milan; at the absolute national weightlifting ends in fifth place.

In 2014–2015 he obtains six medals at the absolute Italian championships: double silver in the hammer to the winter and the absolutes of Rovereto and bronze in weightlifting ('14), gold to the winter of specialty, bronze to the absolutes of Turin and silver to the national seniors of weightlifting, while the absolute does not finish the race ('15). Also in 2015 he took part in Russia at the European Championship for nations of Čeboksary, finishing in fifth position and then at the World Championships in Beijing in China, unable to reach the final.

Year 2016: Absolute Italian Champion title both at the winter launches and at the Rieti absolutes. In the international arena, he won the bronze medal in Romania in the Winter European Cup of launches in Arad; he also took part in both the Amsterdam European Championships in the Netherlands, finishing in 11th place and the Rio de Janeiro Olympic Games in Brazil, where he failed to gain access to the final.

Year 2017: In February he won in Rieti the absolute Italian title for the winter launches. Between the months of March and June he obtained twice the sixth position in continental seniors: on 12 March on the Spanish island of Gran Canaria, he competed in the Winter European Cup of launches, while on 25 June he competed in France in the Super League of the European Championships in Villeneuve d'Ascq / Lille. On 2 July, at the Italian absolute championships in Trieste, at the sixth and last launch available, he passed Simone Falloni and graduated with a 73.84 m national champion [7]. On 11 August he ranks 10th at the World Championships in London (Great Britain), with the measure of 75.13 m [8] (after having qualified for the final with the last available place).

On 24 February 2018 he won his 10th overall Italian title in Rieti (7 in the winter of launches and 3 in the absolute). 10 March ends in tenth place in Leiria in the European winter Cup of launches in Portugal.

=== Curiosity ===
His use of five turns is quite unique among elite hammer throwing at present.

=== Artistic activity ===
During the 1990s he participated in television programs Scommettiamo che...? (the Italian version of Wetten, dass..?) and 8mm. In 2007 he participated, as an actor in the same part of himself, to the web series NFDMT (episode Carnevale a Ivrea directed by Davide Lingua, of Verolengo, & Michele Melillo) and in 2008 he wrote the autobiographical book, together with G. Mario Castaldi, L'uomo che vinse due volte. Recently he participated in the television program Lo show dei record.

== Progression ==
These are his personal bests year by year.

The athlete for 27 consecutive seasons from 1998 to 2024, from 20 to 46 years old, managed to throw the hammer over 72 m.

Top 40 in world season list
Personal best

Year (age)	Performance	Venue	Date	World Ranking
2024 (46)	72.36	(Italy) Cuneo	16 June	84
2023 (45)	73.36	(Italy) Boissano	27 June	63
2022 (44)	75.56	(Italy) Boissano	9 April	37
2021 (43)	74.27	(Italy) Rovereto	27 June	59
2020 (42)	72.37	(Italy) Mariano Comense	1 Feb	55
2019 (41)	74.17	(Italy) La Spezia	16 July	51
2018 (40)	74.71	(Greece) Nikiti	20 June	39
2017 (39)	77.23	(Italy) Turin	7 May	16
2016 (38)	76.03	(Italy) Boissano	28 September	30
2015 (37)	78.29	(United Kingdom) Loughborough	18 July	8
2014 (36)	74.00	(Italy) Marano di Napoli	13 September	48
2013 (35)	74.58	(Puerto Rico) Ponce	18 May	46
2012 (34)	76.10	(France) Metz	7 June	47
2011 (33)	76.12	(Italy) Turin	26 June	34
2010 (32)	75.72	(Italy) Trento	24 April	38
2009 (31)	79.66	(Spain) Puerto de la Cruz	15 March	9
2008 (30)	79.97	(Poland) Bydgoszcz	1 July	15
2007 (29)	77.65	(France) Nice	28 April	21
2006 (28)	77.66	(Italy) Savona	11 May	25
2005 (27)	76.07	(Switzerland) Genève	11 June	38
2004 (26)	75.67	(Italy) Pavia	2 May	48
2003 (25)	74.97	(Switzerland) Genève	14 June	51
2002 (24)	75.19	(Italy) Benevento	26 May	46
2001 (23)	74.40	(Italy) Rome	3 June	51
2000 (22)	73.52	(Italy) Milan	7 September	74
1999 (21)	76.72	(Italy) Macerata	9 October	40
1998 (20)	73.38	(Italy) Macerata	10 October	72
1997 (19)	66.18	(Italy) Macerata	4 October	192

== Achievements ==
Year	Competition	Venue	Position	Event	Measure	Notes
2006	European Championships	Gothenburg	10th	Hammer throw	73.73 m	(Note: In qualifying he had launched a better measure of 74.69 m)
2008	European Cup Winter Throwing	Split	1st	Hammer throw	77.84 m	
2008	Olympic Games	Beijing	Qual.	Hammer throw	NM	
2008	World Athletics Final	Stuttgart	6th	Hammer throw	73.59 m	
2009	European Cup Winter Throwing	Los Realejos	2nd	Hammer throw	79.66 m	SB
2009	World Military Championships	Sofia	2nd	Hammer throw	78.80 m	
2012	European Championships	Helsinki	21st	Hammer throw	71.07 m	
2015	World Championships	Beijing	19th	Hammer throw	72.85 m	
2016	European Cup Winter Throwing	Arad	3rd	Hammer throw	74.51 m	
2016	European Championships	Amsterdam	10th	Hammer throw	70.00 m	(Note: He had throwed a better measure, 72.94 m, qualification)
2016	Olympic Games	Rio de Janeiro	Qual.	Hammer throw	NM	
2017	World Championships	London	10th	Hammer throw	75.13 m	
2018	European Championships	Berlin	Qual. (13th)	Hammer throw	73.07 m	(Note: First of the not admitted to the final.)
2022	Mediterranean Games	Oran	6th	Hammer throw	70.70 m	

== National titles ==
Marco Lingua has won 18 times the individual national championship.

- Italian Athletics Championships
  - Hammer throw: 2008, 2016, 2017, 2018, 2019, 2020, 2021, 2024 (8)
- Italian Winter Throwing Championships
  - Hammer throw: 2005, 2006, 2007, 2015, 2016, 2017, 2018, 2019, 2021, 2024 (10)

== See also ==
- Italian Athletics Championships - Multi winners
- Italian all-time lists – Hammer throw
