= Vita Pavlysh =

Ukrainian shot putter (born 1969)

Personal information
- Native name: Віктоҏія Анатоліївна Павпиш
- Full name: Viktoriya Anatoliïvna Pavlysh
- Nationality: Ukrainian
- Born: 15 January 1969 (age 57) Kharkov, Ukrainian SSR, Soviet Union
- Height: 174 cm (5 ft 9 in)
- Weight: 85 kg (187 lb)

Sport
- Country: Soviet Union (1987-1991); Unified Team (1992); Ukraine (1993-2004)
- Sport: Athletics
- Event: Shot put
- Turned pro: 1987
- Retired: 2004

Achievements and titles
- Personal best: 21.69 m (1998)
Medal record
Women's Athletics
Representing Ukraine
World Championships
Silver medal – second place	1997 Athens	Shot put
Bronze medal – third place	2001 Edmonton	Shot put
Bronze medal – third place	2003 Paris	Shot put
World Indoor Championships
Gold medal – first place	1997 Paris	Shot put
Disqualified	1999 Maebashi	Shot put
Disqualified	2004 Budapest	Shot put
European Championships
Gold medal – first place	1994 Helsinki	Shot put
Gold medal – first place	1998 Budapest	Shot put
European Indoor Championships
Gold medal – first place	2002 Vienna	Shot put
Silver medal – second place	1998 Valencia	Shot put
IAAF World Cup
Gold medal – first place	1998 Johannesburg	Shot put
World Athletics Final
Gold medal – first place	2003 Monte Carlo	Shot put
IAAF Grand Prix Final
Silver medal – second place	1997 Fukuoka	Shot put
Bronze medal – third place	1993 London	Shot put
European Throwing Cup
Gold medal – first place	2001 Nice	Shot put
Gold medal – first place	2002 Pula	Shot put
Gold medal – first place	2004 Marsa	Shot put

Viktoriya Anatoliïvna Pavlysh (Ukrainian: Вікторія Анатопіївна Павпиш; born 15 January 1969 in Kharkov, Ukrainian SSR, Soviet Union) is a former Ukrainian track and field athlete who specialized in the shot put.

Pavlysh was stripped of her 1999 IAAF World Indoor Championships gold medal after she had tested positive for anabolic steroid stanozolol at the event in Maebashi, Japan. She claimed that she may have taken the drug to aid her recovery from injury. For this offence she received a two-year ban.

Five years later at the 2004 IAAF World Indoor Championships in Budapest, Hungary she won the title again only to fail the drug test for the same reason. She was again stripped of her title and banned from athletics for life.

== See also ==
- List of sportspeople sanctioned for doping offences
