= Mauro Fraresso =

Italian male javelin thrower

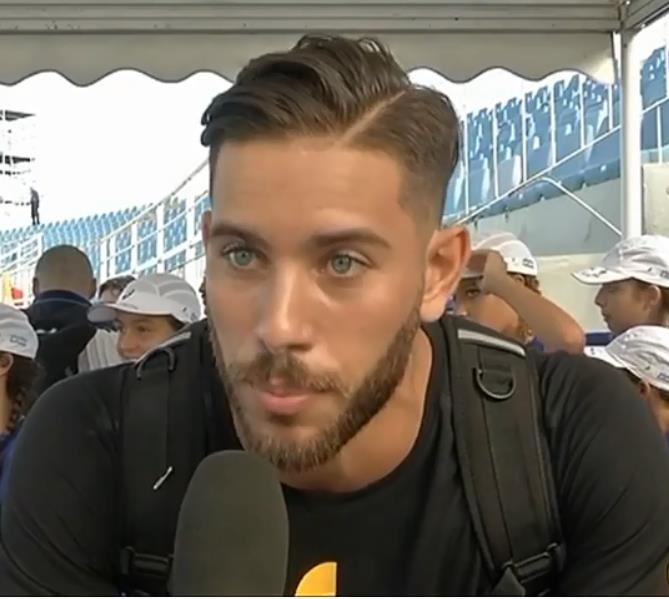
- Fraresso in 2018.

Personal information
- National team: Italy: 3 caps (2017-)
- Born: 19 January 1993 (age 33) Castelfranco Veneto
- Height: 193 cm (6 ft 4 in)
- Weight: 82 kg (181 lb)

Sport
- Country: Italy
- Sport: Athletics
- Event: Javelin throw
- Club: G.S. Fiamme Gialle
- Coached by: Emanuele Serafin

Achievements and titles
- Personal best: Javelin throw: 81.79 m (2019)
Medal record
European Throwing Cup
Bronze medal – third place	2019 Šamorín	Javelin throw

Mauro Fraresso (born 13 January 1993) is an Italian male javelin thrower.

== Biography ==
In winter 2019 he established the second best Italian measure of all-time and at that moment the best measure in the world top lists IAAF.

== Personal best ==
- Javelin throw: 81.79 m (Lucca, 24 February 2019)

== National titles ==
He has won 6 times the individual national championship.

- Italian Athletics Championships
  - Javelin throw: 2017, 2018, 2019
- Italian Winter Throwing Championships
  - Javelin throw: 2017, 2018, 2019

== See also ==
- Italian all-time lists - Javelin throw
