= Assunta Legnante =

Italian Paralympic shot putter

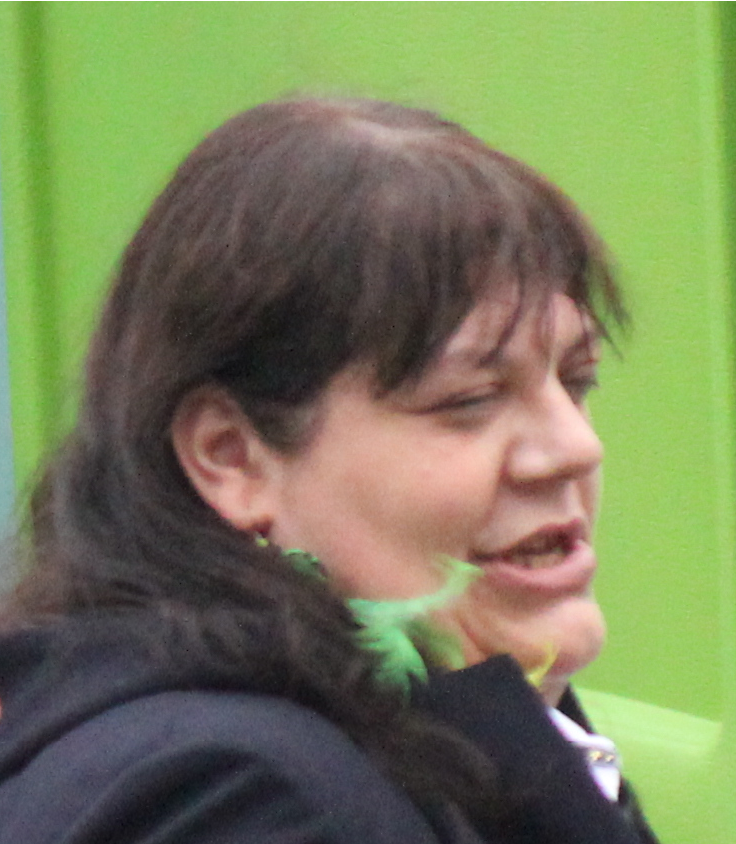

Personal information
- Nationality: Italian
- Born: 14 May 1978 (age 48) Naples, Italy
- Height: 1.89 m (6 ft 2 1/2 in)
- Weight: 122 kg (269 lb)

Sport
- Country: Italy
- Sport: Athletics; Paralympic athletics
- Disability: Visually impaired
- Disability class: T11
- Events: Shot put Discus throw
- Club: Italgest Athletic Club

Achievements and titles
- Personal bests: Shot put: 19.04 m (2006); Shot put indoor: 19.20 m (2002); Shot put F11: 17.32 m (2014); Discus Throw F11 : 32.72 m (2012)
Medal record
Women's athletics
Representing Italy
Paralympic Games
Gold medal – first place	2012 London	Shot put F11–12
Gold medal – first place	2016 Rio de Janeiro	Shot put – F12
Gold medal – first place	2024 Paris	Shot Put – F12
Silver medal – second place	2020 Tokyo	Discus throw – F11
Silver medal – second place	2020 Tokyo	Shot put – F12
Silver medal – second place	2024 Paris	Discus throw – F11
World Championships
Gold medal – first place	2015 Doha	Shot put – F12
Gold medal – first place	2019 Dubai	Discus throw – F11
Gold medal – first place	2023 Paris	Shot put – F12
Gold medal – first place	2025 New Delhi	Shot put – F12
Silver medal – second place	2025 New Delhi	Discus throw – F11
European Championships
Gold medal – first place	2014 Swansea	Shot put – F11/12
Gold medal – first place	2014 Swansea	Discus – F11/12
European Indoor Championships
Gold medal – first place	2007 Birmingham	Shot put
Silver medal – second place	2002 Vienna	Shot put
Mediterranean Games
Gold medal – first place	2001 Radès	Shot put
Silver medal – second place	2009 Pescara	Shot put
European Cup Winter Throwing
Gold medal – first place	2008 Split	Shot put
Silver medal – second place	2002 Pola	Shot put
Silver medal – second place	2004 Marsa	Shot put
Silver medal – second place	2005 Mersin	Shot put
Silver medal – second place	2007 Jalta	Shot put
European U23 Championships
Bronze medal – third place	1999 Gothenburg	Shot put
European Junior Championships
Bronze medal – third place	1997 Ljubljana	Shot put

Assunta Legnante (born 14 May 1978) is a visually impaired Italian shot putter. She has competed in both the Olympics and the Paralympics, one of the few athletes to do so. As of February 2013, she is the current F11 shot put world record holder. She competed at the 2020 Summer Paralympics, in Women's discus throw F11, and Women's shot put F12, winning silver medals.

== Non-disabled athletics career ==
Legnante won the silver medal at the 2002 and the gold medal at the 2007 European Indoor Athletics Championships, where she captained the Italian team. In 2009 she is Silver Medal in the same category at the Mediterranean Games

She finished fifth at the 2006 European Athletics Championships. She competed at the 2008 Summer Olympics in Beijing, having missed the 2004 Olympics due to dangerously high intraocular pressure.

Her personal best throw is 19.04 metres, achieved in September 2006 in Busto Arsizio. Her best indoor result is 19.20 metres, achieved in February 2002 in Genova.

== Blindness and Paralympics ==
Legnante was born with congenital glaucoma in both eyes. In 2009, she suddenly lost the sight in her better, right eye. Her left retina then deteriorated. She had a cataract removed in March 2012, but that did not improve her sight. She now has light perception in her left eye, but nothing more.

The 2007 European indoor champion did not lose heart and started a new career as a Paralympic athlete, training for the forthcoming 2012 Summer Paralympics.

At the 2012 Italian Paralympic Athletics Championships in Turin she set a new F11 shot put world record with a throw of 13.27 metres. On 8 June, at Memorial Primo Nebiolo in Turin, she improved the world record, three times, to 15.22 m. At the London Paralympics, she broke her own world record with a throw of 16.74 metres.

In 2014, she returned to international level throwing 17.09 on 20 June and 17.39 at the regional championships in Naples eight days later.

== Achievements ==
Year	Competition	Venue	Position	Event	Notes
Athletics
1996	World Junior Championships	Sydney, Australia	13th (q)	Shot put	13.44 m
1999	European U23 Championships	Gothenburg, Sweden	3rd	Shot put	16.53 m
2001	Mediterranean Games	Radès, Tunisia	1st	Shot put	17.23 m
2001	Universiade	Beijing, China	11th	Shot put	16.16 m
2002	European Indoor Championships	Vienna, Austria	2nd	Shot put	18.60 m
2002	European Championships	Munich, Germany	8th	Shot put	18.23 m = PB
2003	World Indoor Championships	Birmingham, United Kingdom	8th	Shot put	18.20 m
2003	World Championships	Paris, France	8th	Shot put	18.28 m
2004	World Athletics Final	Monte Carlo, Monaco	6th	Shot put	17.20 m
2005	European Indoor Championships	Madrid, Spain	6th	Shot put	17.76 m
2005	World Championships	Helsinki, Finland	12th	Shot put	16.99 m
2005	Universiade	İzmir, Turkey	4th	Shot put	17.31 m
2006	European Championships	Gothenburg, Sweden	5th	Shot put	18.83 m
2007	European Indoor Championships	Birmingham, United Kingdom	1st	Shot put	18.92 m
2009	Mediterranean Games	Pescara, Italy	2nd	Shot put	17.44 m
Paralympic Athletics
2012	Summer Paralympics	London, United Kingdom	1st	Shot put	16.74 m
2012	Summer Paralympics	London, United Kingdom	8th	Discus throw	30.81 m
2016	Summer Paralympics	Rio de Janeiro, Brazil	1st	Shot put	15.74 m
2016	Summer Paralympics	Rio de Janeiro, Brazil	4th	Discus throw	31.51 m

== See also ==
- List of athletes who have competed in the Paralympics and Olympics
- Italian all-time lists – shot put
