= 2008 European Cup Winter Throwing =

2008 European Throwing Cup
- Events: 16

The 2008 European Cup Winter Throwing was held on 15 and 16 March 2008 at Stadion Park mladeži in Split, Croatia. It was the eighth edition of the athletics competition for throwing events.

The competition featured men's and women's contests in shot put, discus throw, javelin throw and hammer throw. In addition to the senior competitions, there were also under-23 events for younger athletes.

== Medal summary ==
=== Senior men ===
Event	Gold		Silver		Bronze	
Shot put	Rutger Smith (NED)	20.77 m	Marco Fortes (POR)	20.13 m NR	Hamza Alić (BIH)	20.13 m
Discus throw	Gerd Kanter (EST)	65.25 m	Robert Harting (GER)	64.34 m	Rutger Smith (NED)	63.80 m
Hammer throw	Marco Lingua (ITA)	77.87 m	Krisztián Pars (HUN)	77.06 m	Dzmitry Shako (BLR)	76.86 m
Javelin throw	Ilya Korotkov (RUS)	81.52 m	Stephan Steding (GER)	79.55 m	Mihkel Kukk (EST)	78.41 m
WR world record | AR area record | CR championship record | GR games record | NR national record | OR Olympic record | PB personal best | SB season best | WL world leading (in a given season)

=== Senior women ===
Event	Gold		Silver		Bronze	
Shot put	Assunta Legnante (ITA)	18.98 m	Anna Omarova (RUS)	18.38 m	Chiara Rosa (ITA)	18.05 m
Discus throw	Nicoleta Grasu (ROM)	60.25 m	Mélina Robert-Michon (FRA)	59.93 m	Dragana Tomašević (SRB)	59.64 m
Hammer throw	Anita Włodarczyk (POL)	71.84 m	Betty Heidler (GER)	71.10 m	Kathrin Klaas (GER)	69.04 m
Javelin throw	Goldie Sayers (GBR)	63.65 m	Martina Ratej (SLO)	63.16 m NR	Zahra Bani (ITA)	59.42 m
WR world record | AR area record | CR championship record | GR games record | NR national record | OR Olympic record | PB personal best | SB season best | WL world leading (in a given season)

=== Under-23 men ===
Event	Gold		Silver		Bronze	
Shot put	Lajos Kürthy (HUN)	19.30 m	Nikola Kišanic (CRO)	18.91 m	Viktor Samolyuk (UKR)	17.76 m
Discus throw	Nikolay Sedyuk (RUS)	63.20 m	Ivan Hryshyn (UKR)	60.00 m	Siarhei Rohanau (BLR)	58.38 m
Hammer throw	Yury Shayunou (BLR)	73.32 m	Kristóf Németh (HUN)	71.37 m	Petri Mättölä (FIN)	69.78 m
Javelin throw	Roman Avramenko (UKR)	78.72 m	Ari Mannio (FIN)	78.01 m	Thomas Smet (BEL)	77.68 m

=== Under-23 women ===
Event	Gold		Silver		Bronze	
Shot put	Irina Tarasova (RUS)	16.73 m	Alena Kopets (BLR)	16.69 m	Catherine Timmermans (BEL)	16.35 m
Discus throw	Eden Francis (GBR)	55.90 m	Ionela Vartolomei (ROM)	52.53 m	Tatyana Kopytova (RUS)	52.14 m
Hammer throw	Mariya Bespalova (RUS)	66.13 m	Marina Marghiev (MDA)	65.47 m	Lena Solvin (FIN)	63.88 m
Javelin throw	Mariya Abakumova (RUS)	62.07 m	Maria Negoita (ROM)	54.62 m	Ivana Vukovic (CRO)	53.41 m
