= Nicola Vizzoni =

Italian hammer thrower

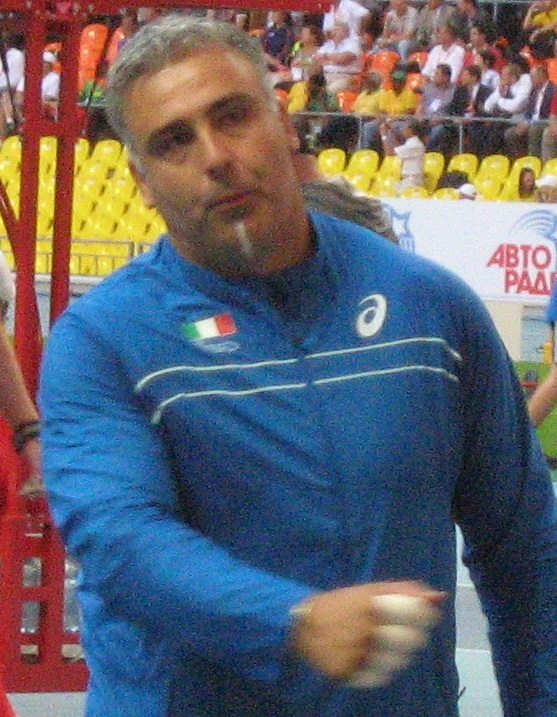
- Vizzoni at Moscow 2013.

Personal information
- Nickname: Ilvizzo
- Nationality: Italian
- Born: 4 November 1973 (age 52) Pietrasanta, Italy
- Height: 1.93 m (6 ft 4 in)
- Weight: 126 kg (278 lb)

Sport
- Country: Italy
- Sport: Athletics
- Event: Hammer throw
- Club: G.S. Fiamme Gialle
- Retired: 2016
Medal record
Event	1st	2nd	3rd
Olympic Games	0	1	0
European Championships	0	1	0
Summer Universiade	1	0	0
Mediterranean Games	2	0	1
World Military Games	0	2	0
World Military Championships	2	1	0
European Cup	1	3	1
European Cup Winter Throwing	2	0	1
Olympic Games
Silver medal – second place	2000 Sydney	Hammer throw
European Championships
Silver medal – second place	2010 Barcelona	Hammer throw
Summer Universiade
Gold medal – first place	2001 Beijing	Hammer throw
Mediterranean Games
Gold medal – first place	2001 Radès	Hammer throw
Gold medal – first place	2009 Pescara	Hammer throw
Bronze medal – third place	2013 Mersin	Hammer throw

Nicola Vizzoni (born 4 November 1973) is a male hammer thrower from Italy. He won the silver medal at the 2000 Summer Olympics and ten years later at the 2010 European Athletics Championships. His personal best throw is 80.50 metres, achieved in July 2001 in Formia.

He has won 19 medals (8 gold, 8 silver, 3 bronze) at the International athletics competitions. Vizzoni is the coach of the Italian national team for the hammer throw.

== Biography ==
He made his first appearance at the World Championships in Athletics in 1997 but he did not make the final. In 1999 he finished seventh in the hammer throw final and the next year he took the silver medal at the 2000 Sydney Olympics. He just missed out on the podium at the 2001 World Championships in Athletics, finishing fourth, but he gained regional honours with a gold at the 2001 Mediterranean Games and also won gold at the Summer Universiade.

He competed at the following two Olympic Games in 2004 and 2008, but was some distance off winning another medal. He became the Mediterranean champion for a second time with a win at the 2009 Mediterranean Games. Vizzoni made a strong start to the 2010 season, throwing 78.22 m early on and winning the gold at the 2010 European Cup Winter Throwing event.

He is engaged to former Italian athlete Claudia Coslovich, national record holder of the javelin throw.

== Progression ==
He finished the season 8 times in world top 25.

Year	Time	Venue	Date	World Rank
2013	75.03	(Portugal) Vila Real de S. António	25 May	
2012	76.42	(Finland) Helsinki	28 June	
2011	80.29	(Italy) Florence	4 June	7th
2010	79.12	(Spain) Barcelona	28 July	6th
2009	79.74	(Italy) Campi Bisenzio	17 May	6th
2008	78.79	(Italy) Lucca	10 June	25th
2007	78.21	(Portugal) Albufeira	26 May	17th
2006	76.89	(Italy) Faenza	27 September	
2005	74.82	(Italy) Florence	17 June	
2004	76.95	(Italy) Florence	10 July	
2003	77.69	(Italy) Viareggio	13 August	
2002	78.80	(Italy) Viareggio	23 August	
2001	80.50	(Italy) Formia	14 July	13th
2000	79.64	(Australia) Sydney	24 September	23rd
1999	79.59	(Italy) Padua	26 June	17th
1998	77.89	(Italy) Rome	9 July	
1997	77.10	San Marino	17 May	
1996	75.30	(South Africa) Pretoria	1 January	
1995	74.48	(Italy) Pescara	13 September	
1994	71.78	(Italy) Pescara	18 June	

== Achievements ==
Year	Competition	Venue	Position	Notes
Representing Italy
1991	European Junior Championships	Thessaloniki, Greece	8th	62.20 m
1992	World Junior Championships	Seoul, South Korea	5th	66.96 m
1995	Universiade	Fukuoka, Japan	13th	70.70 m
1997	Mediterranean Games	Bari, Italy	5th	74.86 m
1997	Universiade	Catania, Italy	5th	75.12 m
1997	World Championships	Athens, Greece	22nd	73.42 m
1998	European Championships	Budapest, Hungary	17th	74.65 m
1999	World Championships	Seville, Spain	7th	78.31 m
1999	World Military Games	Zagreb, Croatia	2nd	78.04 m
2000	Olympic Games	Sydney, Australia	2nd	79.64 m
2001	Mediterranean Games	İzmir, Tunisia	1st	78.48 m
2001	World Championships	Edmonton, Canada	4th	80.13 m
2001	World Military Championships	Beirut, Lebanon	1st	77.93 m
2001	Universiade	Beijing, China	1st	78.41 m
2002	European Championships	Munich, Germany	13th	77.57 m
2002	World Military Championships	Tivoli, Italy	1st	77.80 m
2003	European Cup Winter Throwing	Gioia Tauro, Italy	1st	75.35 m
2003	World Championships	Paris, France	15th	75.76 m
2004	Olympic Games	Athens, Greece	10th	74.27 m
2005	Mediterranean Games	Almeria, Spain	4th	73.64 m
2005	World Championships	Helsinki, Finland	25th	70.77 m
2006	European Championships	Gothenburg, Sweden	9th	76.55 m
2007	World Championships	Osaka, Japan	16th	73.64 m
2007	World Military Games	Hyderabad, India	2nd	74.97 m
2008	Olympic Games	Beijing, PR China	13th	75.01 m
2009	European Cup Winter Throwing	Tenerife, Spain	3rd	78.51 m
2009	Mediterranean Games	Pescara, Italy	1st	75.92 m
2009	World Championships	Berlin, Germany	9th	73.70 m
2009	World Military Championships	Sofia, Bulgaria	3rd	78.06 m
2010	European Cup Winter Throwing	Arles, France	1st	76.63 m
2010	European Championships	Barcelona, Spain	2nd	79.12 m
2011	World Championships	Daegu, South Korea	8th	77.04 m
2012	European Championships	Helsinki, Finland	5th	75.13 m
2012	Olympic Games	London, United Kingdom	8th	76.07 m
2013	Mediterranean Games	Mersin, Turkey	3rd	76.86 m
2013	World Championships	Moscow, Russia	7th	77.61 m

== Palmarès ==
Nicola Vizzoni has been a finalist 10 times in his 17 appearances in the three major International athletics competitions.

Olympic Games				World Championships									European Championships				
00	04	08	12	97	99	01	03	05	07	09	11	13	98	02	06	10	12
2	10	NF	8	NF	7	4	NF	NF	NF	9	8	7	NF	NF	9	2	5

== National titles ==
Nicola Vizzoni has won the individual national championship 28 times.

- 14 wins in the hammer throw (1998, 2000, 2001, 2002, 2003, 2004, 2005, 2006, 2007, 2009, 2010, 2011, 2013, 2014)
- 14 wins in the hammer throw at the Italian Winter Throwing Championships (1994, 1998, 1999, 2000, 2001, 2002, 2003, 2008, 2009, 2010, 2011, 2013, 2014)

== Honours ==

Officer: Ufficiale Ordine al Merito della Repubblica Italiana: 27 September 2004

== See also ==
- Athletes with most appearances at the World Championships
- Italian Athletics Championships – Multi winners
- Italy national athletics team – More caps
- Italian all-time top lists – Hammer throw
