= 2005 European Cup Winter Throwing =

2005 European Throwing Cup
- Events: 8

Official logo

The 2005 European Cup Winter Throwing was held on 12 and 13 March at Macit Özcan Sports Complex in Mersin, Turkey. It was the fifth edition of the athletics competition for throwing events organised by the European Athletics Association. A total of 174 athletes from 29 countries entered the competition. It was the first time that the competition was held with the Cup name, changing from the European Winter Throwing Challenge moniker it had since its initial edition in 2001.

The competition featured men's and women's contests in shot put, discus throw, javelin throw and hammer throw. Athletes were seeded into "A" and "B" groups in each competition. Lada Chernova of Russia was the sole "B" seeded athlete to take a medal, finishing as runner-up in the women's javelin throw.

Two national records were broken during the competition: men's shot put winner Rutger Smith of the Netherlands set a new Dutch record with his throw of 21.00 m (68 ft 10 3/4 in) and women's hammer throw gold medallist Ivana Brkljačić broke the Croatian record for the event with 71.00 m (232 ft 11 1/4 in).

Russia was easily the best performing nation of the tournament, taking the men's and women's titles on points and having the most medals, with three of each colour. Germany was runner-up in both men's and women's divisions and had the next most medals with one gold medal and three bronze.

Women's hammer bronze medallist Olga Kuzenkova was retrospectively found to be doping around 2004 to 2005, but due to limitations of retesting her disqualification was only for the period of August 2005 to 2007 and her mark in Mersin still stands.

== Medal summary ==
=== Men ===
Event	Gold		Silver		Bronze	
Shot put	Rutger Smith (NED)	21.00 m NR	Gheorghe Guşet (ROM)	20.75 m	Manuel Martínez Gutiérrez (ESP)	20.22 m
Discus throw	Gerd Kanter (EST)	66.05 m	Gábor Máté (HUN)	64.17 m	Rutger Smith (NED)	62.80 m
Javelin throw	Alexandr Ivanov (RUS)	81.13 m	Igor Sukhomlinov (RUS)	80.02 m	Manuel Nau (GER)	76.76 m
Hammer throw	Ivan Tsikhan (BLR)	80.79 m	Aleksey Zagornyi (RUS)	78.11 m	Ilya Konovalov (RUS)	77.35 m
WR world record | AR area record | CR championship record | GR games record | NR national record | OR Olympic record | PB personal best | SB season best | WL world leading (in a given season)

=== Women ===
Event	Gold		Silver		Bronze	
Shot put	Olga Ryabinkina (RUS)	18.41 m	Assunta Legnante (ITA)	17.98 m	Kristin Marten (GER)	17.68 m
Discus throw	Natalya Sadova (RUS)	61.74 m	Nicoleta Grasu (ROM)	60.75 m	Jana Tucholke (GER)	57.84 m
Javelin throw	Steffi Nerius (GER)	61.01 m	Lada Chernova (RUS)	60.05 m	Mariya Abakumova (RUS)	59.06 m
Hammer throw	Ivana Brkljačić (CRO)	71.00 m NR	Mihaela Melinte (ROM)	70.40 m	Olga Kuzenkova (RUS)	70.11 m

== Medal and points table ==
* Host nation (Turkey)

Rank	Nation	Gold	Silver	Bronze	Total
1	Russia (RUS)	3	3	3	9
2	Germany (GER)	1	0	3	4
3	Netherlands (NED)	1	0	1	2
4	Belarus (BLR)	1	0	0	1
4	Croatia (CRO)	1	0	0	1
4	Estonia (EST)	1	0	0	1
7	Romania (ROM)	0	3	0	3
8	Hungary (HUN)	0	1	0	1
8	Italy (ITA)	0	1	0	1
10	Spain (ESP)	0	0	1	1
11	Turkey (TUR)*	0	0	0	0
11	Ukraine (UKR)	0	0	0	0
Totals (12 entries)		8	8	8	24

== Participation ==
- Albania
- Belgium
- Belarus
- Croatia
- Czech Republic
- Estonia
- Finland
- France
- Germany
- Great Britain
- Greece
- Hungary
- Ireland
- Israel
- Italy
- Lithuania
- Moldova
- Netherlands
- Poland
- Portugal
- Romania
- Russia
- Serbia and Montenegro
- Slovenia
- Spain
- Switzerland
- Sweden
- Turkey
- Ukraine
