= 2007 European Cup Winter Throwing =

2007 European Throwing Cup
- Events: 16

The 2007 European Cup Winter Throwing was held on 17 and 18 March at Avangard Stadium in Yalta, Ukraine. It was the seventh edition of the athletics competition for throwing events organised by the European Athletics Association. A total of 203 athletes from 26 countries entered the competition – a new high for the event.

== Summary ==
The competition featured men's and women's contests in shot put, discus throw, javelin throw and hammer throw. In addition to the senior competitions, there were also under-23 events for younger athletes.

Athletes in the senior competitions were seeded into "A" and "B" groups. Igor Sukhomlinov of Russia surprised with a personal best of 83.34 m in the javelin throw to win the title despite being seeded in the "B" group. Dzimitry Hancharuk, Chiara Rosa, Nataliya Semenova were other "B" group athletes to take a medal, each of them a bronze.

Two national records were broken during the competition: men's discus throw bronze medallist Ercüment Olgundeniz improved the Turkish record to 64.34 metres, while under-23 athlete Melik Janoyan set a new Armenian best for the javelin with his throw of 69.34 metres.

Several athletes went on to take top honours at the 2007 World Championships in Athletics. Discus winners Gerd Kanter and Franka Dietzsch became world champions, while the men's hammer throwers Primož Kozmus and Ivan Tsikhan took the top two spots in Osaka as they did in Yalta.

== Medal winners ==
=== Senior ===
Men
Event	Gold		Silver		Bronze	
Shot put	Yuriy Bilonoh (UKR)	19.95 m	Pavel Lyzhyn (BLR)	19.86 m	Dzimitry Hancharuk (BLR)	19.42 m
Discus throw	Gerd Kanter (EST)	65.43 m	Piotr Małachowski (POL)	65.06 m	Ercüment Olgundeniz (TUR)	64.34 m NR
Javelin throw	Igor Sukhomlinov (RUS)	83.34 m	Magnus Arvidsson (SWE)	76.27 m	Ainārs Kovals (LAT)	74.64 m
Hammer throw	Primož Kozmus (SLO)	77.99 m	Ivan Tsikhan (BLR)	77.79 m	Eşref Apak (TUR)	76.68 m
WR world record | AR area record | CR championship record | GR games record | NR national record | OR Olympic record | PB personal best | SB season best | WL world leading (in a given season)

Women
Event	Gold		Silver		Bronze	
Shot put	Petra Lammert (GER)	18.67 m	Assunta Legnante (ITA)	18.31 m	Chiara Rosa (ITA)	18.14 m
Discus throw	Franka Dietzsch (GER)	66.14 m	Mélina Robert-Michon (FRA)	63.48 m	Nataliya Semenova (UKR)	60.51 m
Javelin throw	Steffi Nerius (GER)	63.14 m	Goldie Sayers (GBR)	60.02 m	Zahra Bani (ITA)	58.95 m
Hammer throw	Manuela Montebrun (FRA)	72.65 m	Tatyana Lysenko (RUS)	72.05 m	Ester Balassini (ITA)	68.70 m

=== Under-23 ===
Under-23 men
Event	Gold		Silver		Bronze	
Shot put	Luka Rujević (SRB)	19.45 m	Lajos Kürthy (HUN)	18.49 m	Daniel Anglés (ESP)	18.35 m
Discus throw	Dmytro Isnyuk (UKR)	58.23 m	Sergey Gribkov (RUS)	57.79 m	Mihai Grasu (ROM)	57.57 m
Javelin throw	Roman Avramenko (UKR)	73.96 m	Aleksey Tovarnov (RUS)	69.41 m	Melik Janoyan (ARM)	69.34 m NR
Hammer throw	Andrey Azarenkov (RUS)	72.41 m	Oleksiy Sokyrskyy (UKR)	67.61 m	Kristóf Németh (HUN)	67.40 m

Under 23 women
Event	Gold		Silver		Bronze	
Shot put	Anna Avdeyeva (RUS)	17.32 m	Alena Kopets (BLR)	15.74 m	Josephine Terlecki (GER)	15.37 m
Discus throw	Nadine Müller (GER)	60.35 m	Kateryna Karsak (UKR)	56.91 m	Liliana Cá (POR)	53.95 m
Javelin throw	Mariya Abakumova (RUS)	59.42 m	Sinta Ozoliņa-Kovala (LAT)	55.03 m	Linda Stahl (GER)	55.02 m
Hammer throw	Maryia Smaliachkova (BLR)	66.78 m	Bianca Perie (ROM)	66.00 m	Dorotea Habazin (CRO)	61.82 m

== Medal and points table ==
Rank	Nation	Gold	Silver	Bronze	Total
1	Russia (RUS)	4	3	0	7
2	Germany (GER)	4	0	2	6
3	Ukraine (UKR)	3	2	1	6
4	Belarus (BLR)	1	3	1	5
5	France (FRA)	1	1	0	2
6	Estonia (EST)	1	0	0	1
6	Serbia (SRB)	1	0	0	1
6	Slovenia (SLO)	1	0	0	1
9	Italy (ITA)	0	1	3	4
10	Hungary (HUN)	0	1	1	2
10	Latvia (LAT)	0	1	1	2
10	Romania (ROM)	0	1	1	2
13	Great Britain (GBR)	0	1	0	1
13	Poland (POL)	0	1	0	1
13	Sweden (SWE)	0	1	0	1
16	Turkey (TUR)	0	0	2	2
17	Armenia (ARM)	0	0	1	1
17	Croatia (CRO)	0	0	1	1
17	Portugal (POR)	0	0	1	1
17	Spain (ESP)	0	0	1	1
Totals (20 entries)		16	16	16	48

== Participation ==
- Armenia
- Belarus
- Belgium
- Croatia
- Cyprus
- Estonia
- France
- Finland
- Germany
- Great Britain
- Greece
- Hungary
- Israel
- Italy
- Latvia
- Moldova
- Poland
- Portugal
- Romania
- Russia
- Serbia
- Slovenia
- Spain
- Sweden
- Turkey
- Ukraine
