= Alena Abramchuk =

Belarusian track and field athlete

Personal information
- Born: 14 February 1988 (age 38) Davyd-Haradok, Byelorussian SSR, Soviet Union
- Height: 1.82 m (5 ft 11 1/2 in)
- Weight: 95 kg (209 lb)

Sport
- Country: Belarus
- Sport: Track and field
- Event: Shot put
Medal record
European Indoor Championships
Bronze medal – third place	2013 Gothenburg	Shot put

Alena Vasilyeuna Abramchuk, née Kapiets (Belarusian: Але́на Васі́леўна Абрамчу́к (Капе́ц); Russian: Еле́на Васи́льевна Абрамчу́к (Копе́ц); born 14 February 1988) is a Belarusian track and field athlete who competes in the shot put. She was the bronze medallist at the 2013 European Athletics Indoor Championships. Her personal best is 19.24 m (63 ft 1 1/4 in), set in 2013.

== Career ==
She began competing at national level as a teenager and made her international debut at the 2006 World Junior Championships in Athletics, competing in both the shot put and discus throw events. Her first international medals followed in 2007 with silver medals in the shot put at the 2007 European Athletics Junior Championships and in the under-23 section at the 2007 European Cup Winter Throwing. She was also fifth at the Military World Games. She began attending A.S. Pushkin Brest State University, studying in the physical education department.

Abramchuk focused more on shot put after 2007 and repeated her under-23 winter silver medal with a personal best of 16.69 m (54 ft 9 in) at the 2008 European Cup Winter Throwing, then again at the 2009 edition. She improved her best to 17.97 m (58 ft 11 1/4 in) that season and claimed a trio of bronze medals at the European Team Championships, Summer Universiade and the European Athletics U23 Championships. She added two centimetres to her best in 2010, but did not compete internationally. She established herself among the world's top throwers at the start of 2011, throwing a best of 18.82 m (61 ft 8 3/4 in) in Minsk, which ranked her in the top twenty shot putters that season.

Abramchuk won her first national title indoors in February 2011 then claimed her first international win at 2011 European Cup Winter Throwing, beating France's Jessica Cérival. She made her debut on the IAAF Diamond League circuit in Shanghai and ranked fifth at the Universiade. Another best of 18.90 m (62 ft 0 in) the following February saw her again ranked in the world's top twenty in 2012. She failed to match this form in major competition, being eliminated at the 2012 IAAF World Indoor Championships and placing fifth at the 2012 European Cup Winter Throwing.

She threw beyond nineteen metres for the first time in January 2013 with a mark of 19.06 m (62 ft 6 1/4 in). A bronze medal at the 2013 European Athletics Indoor Championships – her first podium finish at a major championship – marked a new high. She was the national champion indoors and outdoors that year and regularly threw beyond eighteen metres in competition. She placed second to Russia's Yevgeniya Kolodko at the 2013 European Cup Winter Throwing and had several top five finishes on the 2013 IAAF Diamond League circuit. Her best that year was 19.24 m (63 ft 1 1/4 in), set in Minsk, and she was a finalist at the 2013 World Championships in Athletics.

In the 2014 season she was eliminated in the qualifiers of the 2014 IAAF World Indoor Championships, but made the final of the 2014 European Athletics Championships, coming in ninth place. At the 2014 European Cup Winter Throwing she was again beaten by Kolodko of Russia. She came close to another continental bronze at the 2015 European Athletics Indoor Championships, beating narrowly beaten into fourth by Radoslava Mavrodieva. She set a best in the discus of 55.16 m (180 ft 11 1/2 in) in taking her first national title in that year, but missed the 2015 World Championships in Athletics.

== National titles ==
- Belarusian Athletics Championships
  - Shot put: 2013
  - Discus throw: 2015
- Belarusian Indoor Championships
  - Shot put: 2011, 2013, 2014

== International competitions ==
Year	Competition	Venue	Position	Event	Notes
2006	World Junior Championships	Beijing, China	17th (q)	Shot put	14.77 m
2006	World Junior Championships	Beijing, China	19th (q)	Discus throw	44.77 m
2007	European Cup Winter Throwing (U23)	Yalta, Ukraine	2nd	Shot put	15.74 m
2007	European Junior Championships	Hengelo, Netherlands	2nd	Shot put	16.10 m
2007	European Junior Championships	Hengelo, Netherlands	14th	Discus throw	45.84 m
2007	Military World Games	Hyderabad, India	5th	Shot put	14.91 m
2008	European Cup Winter Throwing (U23)	Split, Croatia	2nd	Shot put	16.69 m
2009	European Cup Winter Throwing (U23)	Los Realejos, Spain	2nd	Shot put	16.36 m
2009	European Team Championships 1st League	Bergen, Norway	3rd	Shot put	17.08 m
2009	Universiade	Belgrade, Serbia	3rd	Shot put	17.48 m
2009	European U23 Championships	Kaunas, Lithuania	3rd	Shot put	17.72 m
2011	European Indoor Championships	Paris, France	9th (q)	Shot put	17.11 m
2011	European Cup Winter Throwing	Sofia, Bulgaria	1st	Shot put	17.71
2011	Universiade	Shenzhen, China	5th	Shot put	17.07 m
2012	World Indoor Championships	Istanbul, Turkey	9th (q)	Shot put	17.80 m
2013	European Indoor Championships	Gothenburg, Sweden	3rd	Shot put	18.85 m
2013	European Cup Winter Throwing	Castellón de la Plana, Spain	2nd	Shot put	18.18 m
2013	World Championships	Moscow, Russia	12th	Shot put	17.70 m
2014	World Indoor Championships	Sopot, Poland	10th (q)	Shot put	17.73 m
2014	European Cup Winter Throwing	Leiria, Portugal	2nd	Shot put	18.58 m
2014	European Championships	Zurich, Switzerland	9th	Shot put	17.65 m
2015	European Indoor Championships	Prague, Czech Republic	4th	Shot put	17.63 m
2015	European Cup Winter Throwing	Leiria, Portugal	5th	Shot put	17.11 m
