= 2009 European Cup Winter Throwing =

2009 European Throwing Cup
- Events: 16

The 2009 European Cup Winter Throwing was held on 14 and 15 March at the Estadio de Los Realejos in Tenerife, Spain. It was the ninth edition of the athletics competition for throwing events and was organised by the European Athletics Association and the Real Federación Española de Atletismo (Spanish athletics federation). The competition featured men's and women's contests in shot put, discus throw, javelin throw and hammer throw. In addition to the senior competitions, there were also under-23 events for younger athletes. A total of 226 athletes from 29 nations entered the competition. It was the first time that Spain hosted the competition.

On the first day of competition, Anita Włodarczyk had a world-leading and personal best mark of 75.05 metres to win the women's hammer throw. Nicoleta Grasu was dominant in the women's discus, while Lajos Kürthy edged the host's Manuel Martínez in the men's shot put by six centimetres (both reached the 20-metre mark). Tino Häber took the men's javelin title with his first throw of 77.78 m.

The highest calibre performance on the second day came from Gerd Kanter, whose throw of 69.70 m won the men's discus by nearly five metres – only he threw further in the event that year. In the men's hammer, a close contest between Krisztián Pars and Marco Lingua resulted in the season's first throw over eighty metres, with Pars taking the win with 80.38 m. Nadzeya Astapchuk also had a duel against Anca Heltne in the women's shot put – in spite of being in comparatively poor form Astapchuk still won by a margin of four centimetres. Mariya Abakumova won the women's javelin, which had only moderate performances in the still conditions in Los Realejos.

In the under-23 section, Yury Shayunou's hammer throw of 78.59 m would have ranked him third in the senior competition. Meanwhile, in the under-23 women's javelin, the world junior record holder Vira Rebryk won by almost five metres.

Due to the number of entrants in some events (men's shot put, discus and hammer/women's discus, hammer and javelin), "A" and "B" fields competed separately, with higher ranked athletes going in the "A" category. The performances of each field were combined for the final standings. Three "B" group competitors reached the top three of their events: Markus Münch, Vera Begić and Ásdís Hjálmsdóttir. Three national records were broken during the competition. Petros Sofianos improved the Cypriot record in the men's hammer to 65.05 metres, while in the women's javelin Ásdís Hjálmsdóttir set an Icelandic best of 60.42 m ahead of Elisabeth Pauer's Austrian record of 58.37 m. Javier Cienfuegos, an eighteen-year-old Spaniard, achieved a national junior record in winning the javelin "B" competition with his throw of 73.18 m.

== Medal summary ==
=== Senior ===
Men
Event	Gold		Silver		Bronze	
Shot put	Lajos Kürthy (HUN)	20.06 m	Manuel Martínez (ESP)	20.00 m	Nedžad Mulabegović (CRO)	19.69 m
Discus throw	Gerd Kanter (EST)	69.70 m	Markus Münch (GER)	64.90 m	Frank Casañas (ESP)	64.70 m
Hammer throw	Krisztián Pars (HUN)	80.38 m	Marco Lingua (ITA)	79.66 m	Nicola Vizzoni (ITA)	78.51 m
Javelin throw	Tino Häber (GER)	77.78 m	Mihkel Kukk (EST)	76.60 m	Mervyn Luckwell (GBR)	74.86 m

Women
Event	Gold		Silver		Bronze	
Shot put	Nadzeya Astapchuk (BLR)	18.80 m	Anca Heltne (ROU)	18.76 m	Chiara Rosa (ITA)	18.55 m
Discus throw	Nicoleta Grasu (ROU)	62.61 m	Żaneta Glanc (POL)	60.45 m	Vera Begić (CRO)	59.27 m
Hammer throw	Anita Włodarczyk (POL)	75.05 m	Betty Heidler (GER)	73.45 m	Silvia Salis (ITA)	71.77 m
Javelin throw	Mariya Abakumova (RUS)	61.87 m	Moonika Aava (EST)	60.76 m	Ásdís Hjálmsdóttir (ISL)	60.42 m NR

=== Under-23 ===
Under-23 men
Event	Gold		Silver		Bronze	
Shot put	Aleksandr Bulanov (RUS)	18.54 m	Yeóryios Yeromarkákis (GRE)	18.17 m	Nick Petersen (DEN)	18.17 m
Discus throw	Ivan Hryshyn (UKR)	62.33 m	Nikolay Sedyuk (RUS)	59.81 m	Brett Morse (GBR)	57.49 m
Hammer throw	Yury Shayunou (BLR)	78.59 m	Anatoliy Pozdnyakov (RUS)	72.21 m	Dmytro Mykolaychuk (UKR)	69.26 m
Javelin throw	Mikko Kankaanpää (FIN)	77.11 m	Roman Avramenko (UKR)	76.67 m	Fatih Avan (TUR)	74.82 m

Under 23 women
Event	Gold		Silver		Bronze	
Shot put	Melissa Boekelman (NED)	16.97 m	Alena Kopets (BLR)	16.36 m	Anita Márton (HUN)	15.99 m
Discus throw	Eden Francis (GBR)	54.19 m	Kateryna Shyshkina (UKR)	52.89 m	Irina Rodrigues (POR)	52.65 m
Hammer throw	Zalina Marghieva (MDA)	68.81 m	Bianca Perie (ROM)	66.25 m	Barbara Špiler (SLO)	62.16 m NJR
Javelin throw	Vira Rebryk (UKR)	59.30 m	Elisabeth Eberl (AUT)	54.31 m	Tatjana Jelača (SRB)	54.14 m
