= 2001 European Winter Throwing Challenge =

2001 European Throwing Cup
- Events: 8

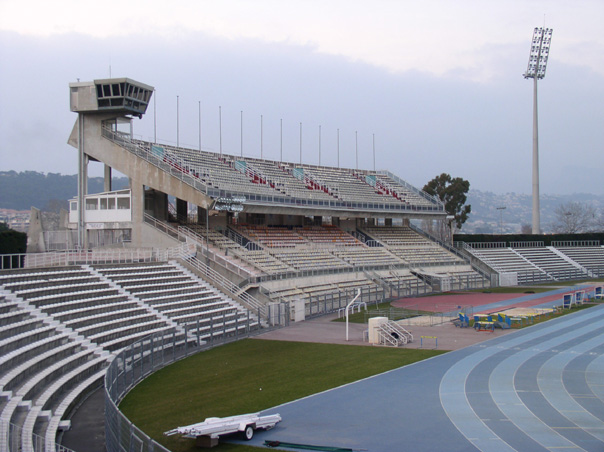
The track and stands at the host venue, Stade Charles-Ehrmann, in Nice

The 2001 European Winter Throwing Challenge was held on 17 and 18 March at Stade Charles-Ehrmann in Nice, France. It was the first edition of the athletics competition for throwing events organised by the European Athletics Association. A total of 151 athletes from 22 countries entered the competition.

The idea behind the creation of the challenge was to provide a venue for throwing athletes to compete during the European winter months. Indoor track and field competitions almost unanimously exclude long-distance throwing events. While colder climates are suitable for cross country running, most throwing athletes lacked a competitive outdoor venue during this period of the year. As a resolution, the European Athletics Association proposed the hosting of a throwing event to be held each March in the warmer areas of the continent. The competition featured men's and women's contests in shot put, discus throw, javelin throw and hammer throw. Athletes were seeded into "A" and "B" groups in several events due to the number of entries.

In the points tally, Olga Kuzenkova, a Russian hammer thrower, delivered the best individual performance of the tournament, gaining 1164 points with her throw of 71.30 m (233 ft 11 in). Spanish shot putter Manuel Martínez Gutiérrez produced the best mark in the men's side, earning 1136 points for his throw of 20.27 m (66 ft 6 in). Two national records were set during the competition, both in the women's hammer throw (an event which had only been added to the Olympic Games programme the previous year). Lorraine Shaw, third place overall, set a British record of 68.15 m (223 ft 7 in) and eighth-placed Cecilia Nilsson broke the Swedish record with her throw of 64.34 m (211 ft 1 in).

The inaugural edition of the event attracted a high calibre of participants, with ten Olympic or World Championships medallists in attendance. Three medallists in Nice went on to take medals on the global stage at the 2001 World Championships in Athletics later that year: women's shot put winner Vita Pavlysh was the world bronze medallist, while Olga Kuzenkova and women's discus winner Nicoleta Grasu were runner-up in their respective events.

== Medal summary ==
=== Men ===
Event	Gold		Silver		Bronze	
Shot put	Manuel Martínez Gutiérrez (ESP)	20.27 m	Paolo Dal Soglio (ITA)	19.96 m	Gheorghe Gușet (ROM)	19.50 m
Discus throw	Timo Tompuri (FIN)	61.79 m	Andrzej Krawczyk (POL)	61.60 m	Aleksandr Borichevskiy (RUS)	61.22 m
Javelin throw	Peter Blank (GER)	82.10 m	Gregor Högler (AUT)	80.81 m	Björn Lange (GER)	78.60 m
Hammer throw	David Chaussinand (FRA)	76.54 m	Vladyslav Piskunov (UKR)	76.41 m	Alexandros Papadimitriou (GRE)	76.36 m
WR world record | AR area record | CR championship record | GR games record | NR national record | OR Olympic record | PB personal best | SB season best | WL world leading (in a given season)

=== Women ===
Event	Gold		Silver		Bronze	
Shot put	Vita Pavlysh (UKR)	19.47 m	Larisa Peleshenko (RUS)	18.77 m	Lyudmila Sechko (RUS)	18.54 m
Discus throw	Nicoleta Grasu (ROM)	65.54 m	Olena Antonova (UKR)	61.88 m	Mélina Robert-Michon (FRA)	61.67 m
Javelin throw	Tatyana Shikolenko (RUS)	63.96 m	Ana Mirela Țermure (ROM)	62.49 m	Claudia Coslovich (ITA)	57.89 m
Hammer throw	Olga Kuzenkova (RUS)	71.30 m	Manuela Montebrun (FRA)	69.72 m	Lorraine Shaw (GBR)	68.15 m NR

== Medal and points table ==
* Host nation (France)

Rank	Nation	Gold	Silver	Bronze	Total
1	Russia (RUS)	2	1	2	5
2	Ukraine (UKR)	1	2	0	3
3	France (FRA)*	1	1	1	3
3	Romania (ROM)	1	1	1	3
5	Germany (GER)	1	0	1	2
6	Finland (FIN)	1	0	0	1
6	Spain (ESP)	1	0	0	1
8	Italy (ITA)	0	1	1	2
9	Austria (AUT)	0	1	0	1
9	Poland (POL)	0	1	0	1
11	Great Britain (GBR)	0	0	1	1
11	Greece (GRE)	0	0	1	1
13	Sweden (SWE)	0	0	0	0
Totals (13 entries)		8	8	8	24

== Participation ==
- Andorra
- Austria
- Belarus
- Croatia
- Finland
- France
- Germany
- Great Britain
- Greece
- Hungary
- Italy
- Lithuania
- Netherlands
- Poland
- Portugal
- Romania
- Russia
- Spain
- San Marino
- Switzerland
- Sweden
- Ukraine
