= Valeriya Zabruskova =

Russian javelin thrower

Valeriya Valerievna Zabruskova (Russian: Валерия Валерьевна Забрускова; born 29 July 1975) is a Russian track and field athlete who specializes in the javelin throw. Her personal best is 64.49 metres, achieved in June 2003 in Tula.

== International competitions ==
Representing Russia
Year	Competition	Venue	Position	Event	Result	Notes
2003	World Championships	Paris, France	9th	Javelin throw	59.51 m	
2003	World Athletics Final	Monte Carlo, Monaco	6th	Javelin throw	60.67 m	
2004	Olympic Games	Athens, Greece	27th (q)	Javelin throw	57.53 m	
2004	World Athletics Final	Monte Carlo, Monaco	7th	Javelin throw	58.63 m	
