= Irina Khudoroshkina =

Russian shot putter (born 1968)

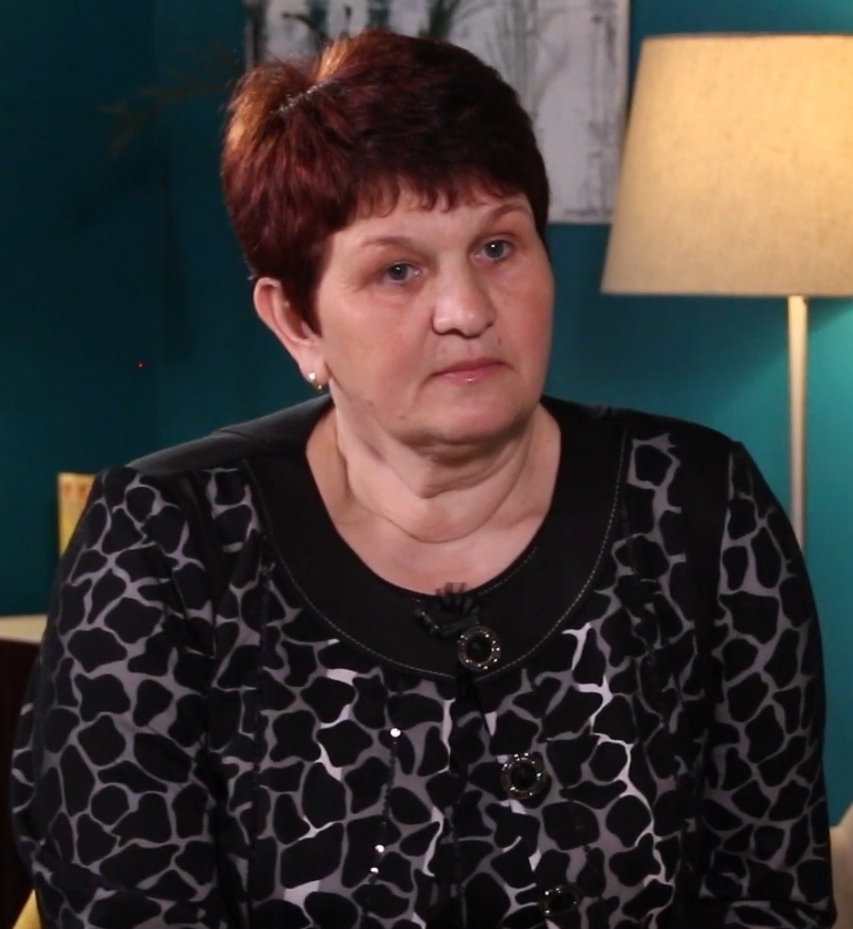

Medal record

Women's athletics

Representing Russia

Olympic Games
| Bronze medal – third place | 1996 Atlanta | Shot put |

Irina Alexandrovna Khudoroshkina (Russian: Ирина Александровна Худорошҝина); born October 13, 1968) is a Russian shot putter.

She won the bronze medal at the 1996 Summer Olympics in Atlanta. She also finished second at the 1996 European Indoor Championships.

In 2004, she was suspended for a doping offense, her suspension lasting from April 2004 to April 2006.

She returned to finish seventh at the 2006 European Championships and win the silver medal at the 2007 European Indoor Championships. She competed at the 2008 Olympic Games without reaching the final.

Her personal best throw is 20.32 metres, achieved in May 1996 in Sochi. After the turn of the 21st century she has 18.92 metres as her best result, achieved in Moscow 2002 and Tula 2008.

== See also ==
- List of doping cases in athletics
- List of Olympic medalists in athletics (women)
- List of 1996 Summer Olympics medal winners
- Shot put at the Olympics
- List of European Athletics Indoor Championships medalists (women)
