= Lada Chernova =

Russian javelin thrower

Lada Vladimirovna Chernova (Russian: Ла́да Влади́мировна Черно́ва; born 1 January 1970) is a Russian javelin thrower. Her personal best throw is 63.35 meters, achieved in August 2007 in Tula.

She finished seventh at the 2006 World Cup. She also competed at the 2006 European Athletics Championships and the 2007 World Championships without reaching the final.

Chernova was given a two-year ban from competition in 2008 after testing positive for the banned substance metenolone. After her return to competition, she failed a second drugs test - for bromantan in February 2012, and was handed a lifetime ban by the Russian Anti-Doping Agency RUSADA. Chernova successfully appealed the decision in a Russian court, but the ban was subsequently confirmed following a counter-appeal by the World Anti-Doping Agency to the Court of Arbitration for Sport.

== International competitions ==
Representing Russia
Year	Competition	Venue	Position	Event	Result	Notes
2007	World Championships	Osaka, Japan	16th	Javelin throw	58.12 m	

== See also ==
- List of doping cases in athletics
