= Cristiana Checchi =

Italian shot putter (born 1977)

Personal information
- Nationality: Italian
- Born: 8 July 1977 (age 48)

Sport
- Country: Italy
- Sport: Athletics
- Event(s): Shot put Discus throw

Achievements and titles
- Personal bests: Shot put: 18.59 m (2005); Discus throw: 59.74 m (2007)
Medal record
Mediterranean Games
Gold medal – first place	2005 Almería	Shot Put

Cristiana Checchi (born 8 July 1977) is an Italian shot putter.

== Biography ==
She finished seventh at the 2002 European Indoor Championships, fourteenth at the 2002 European Championships and eleventh at the 2006 European Championships. She also competed at the World Indoor Championships in 2003 and 2004 and the 2005 World Championships without reaching the final round.

Her personal best throw is 18.59 metres, achieved when she won the 2005 Mediterranean Games in Almería. She has 18.64 metres on the indoor track, achieved in February 2003 in Schio. She also has 59.74 metres in the discus throw, achieved in June 2007 in Milan. She failed a doping test in 2003. She has also competed internationally in the bobsleigh.

== See also ==
- Italian all-time lists - Shot put
- Italian all-time lists - Discus throw
