= Hammer throw at the World Athletics Championships =

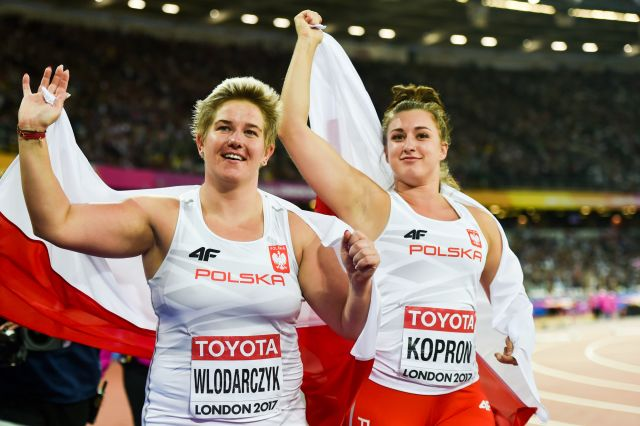
- Anita Włodarczyk and Malwina Kopron during the 2017 championships

Overview
- Gender: Men and women
- Years held: Men: 1983 – 2025; Women: 1999 – 2025

Championship record
- Men: 84.70 m Ethan Katzberg (2025)
- Women: 80.85 m Anita Włodarczyk (2015)

Reigning champion
- Men: Ethan Katzberg (CAN)
- Women: Camryn Rogers (CAN)

The hammer throw at the World Championships in Athletics has been contested by both men since the inaugural edition in 1983, and by women since 1999. The competition format typically has one qualifying round contested by two groups of athletes, with all those clearing the automatic qualifying distance or placing in top twelve overall advancing to the final round.

Poland is by far and away the most successful nation in the event, with 20 medals in total, 11 of them gold. They are the most successful nation in the men's event, as well as the women's event. Canada is the only nation aside from Poland that has won a gold medal in both the men's and the women's event.

Paweł Fajdek is the most successful athlete in the event, winning 5 gold medals in a row between 2013 and 2022. His 5 gold medals are the second-most for any athlete in a single individual event, a feat only bettered by Sergey Bubka in the pole vault. Anita Włodarczyk is the most successful woman, winning 4 gold medals between 2009 and 2017. Yipsi Moreno is the only other athlete besides Fajdek and Włodarczyk to have won more than 2 gold medals in the event.

The championship records for the event are 84.70 m for men, set by Ethan Katzberg in 2025, and 80.85 m for women, set by Włodarczyk in 2015.

Włodarczyk is the only athlete to have broken the world record at the championships, doing so in 2009.

The reigning world champions are Ethan Katzberg and Camryn Rogers, both from Canada.

== Age records ==
- All information from World Athletics.

Distinction	Male			Female		
Distinction	Athlete	Age	Date	Athlete	Age	Date
Youngest champion	Ethan Katzberg (CAN)	21 years, 137 days	20 Aug 2023	Yipsi Moreno (CUB)	20 years, 261 days	7 Aug 2001
Youngest medalist	Ethan Katzberg (CAN)	21 years, 137 days	20 Aug 2023	Yipsi Moreno (CUB)	20 years, 261 days	7 Aug 2001
Youngest finalist	Myhaylo Kokhan (UKR)	18 years, 253 days	2 Oct 2019	Zhang Wenxiu (CHN)	15 years, 138 days	7 Aug 2001
Youngest participant	Ashraf Amgad Elseify (QAT)	18 years, 171 days	10 Aug 2013	Zhang Wenxiu (CHN)	15 years, 137 days	6 Aug 2001
Oldest champion	Koji Murofushi (JPN)	36 years, 325 days	29 Aug 2011	Anita Włodarczyk (POL)	31 years, 364 days	7 Aug 2017
Oldest medalist	Koji Murofushi (JPN)	36 years, 325 days	29 Aug 2011	Olga Kuzenkova (RUS)	32 years, 328 days	28 Aug 2003
Oldest finalist	Igor Astapkovich (BLR)	40 years, 233 days	25 Aug 2003	Martina Hrašnová (SVK)	36 years, 191 days	28 Sep 2019
Oldest participant	Ed Burke (USA)	43 years, 157 days	8 Aug 1983	Elena Teloni (CYP)	38 years, 253 days	26 Aug 2003

== Medalists ==
=== Men ===
Championships	Gold	Silver	Bronze
1983 Helsinki	Sergey Litvinov (URS)	Yuriy Sedykh (URS)	Zdzisław Kwaśny (POL)
1987 Rome	Sergey Litvinov (URS)	Jüri Tamm (URS)	Ralf Haber (GDR)
1991 Tokyo	Yuriy Sedykh (URS)	Igor Astapkovich (URS)	Heinz Weis (GER)
1993 Stuttgart	Andrey Abduvaliyev (TJK)	Igor Astapkovich (BLR)	Tibor Gécsek (HUN)
1995 Gothenburg	Andrey Abduvaliyev (TJK)	Igor Astapkovich (BLR)	Tibor Gécsek (HUN)
1997 Athens	Heinz Weis (GER)	Andriy Skvaruk (UKR)	Vasiliy Sidorenko (RUS)
1999 Seville	Karsten Kobs (GER)	Zsolt Németh (HUN)	Vladyslav Piskunov (UKR)
2001 Edmonton	Szymon Ziółkowski (POL)	Koji Murofushi (JPN)	Ilya Konovalov (RUS)
2003 Saint-Denis	Ivan Tsikhan (BLR)	Adrián Annus (HUN)	Koji Murofushi (JPN)
2005 Helsinki	Szymon Ziółkowski (POL)	Markus Esser (GER)	Olli-Pekka Karjalainen (FIN)
2007 Osaka	Ivan Tsikhan (BLR)	Primož Kozmus (SLO)	Libor Charfreitag (SVK)
2009 Berlin	Primož Kozmus (SLO)	Szymon Ziółkowski (POL)	Aleksey Zagornyi (RUS)
2011 Daegu	Koji Murofushi (JPN)	Krisztián Pars (HUN)	Primož Kozmus (SLO)
2013 Moscow	Paweł Fajdek (POL)	Krisztián Pars (HUN)	Lukáš Melich (CZE)
2015 Beijing	Paweł Fajdek (POL)	Dilshod Nazarov (TJK)	Wojciech Nowicki (POL)
2017 London	Paweł Fajdek (POL)	Valeriy Pronkin (ANA)	Wojciech Nowicki (POL)
2019 Doha	Paweł Fajdek (POL)	Quentin Bigot (FRA)	Bence Halász (HUN); Wojciech Nowicki (POL)
2022 Eugene	Paweł Fajdek (POL)	Wojciech Nowicki (POL)	Eivind Henriksen (NOR)
2023 Budapest	Ethan Katzberg (CAN)	Wojciech Nowicki (POL)	Bence Halász (HUN)
2025 Tokyo	Ethan Katzberg (CAN)	Merlin Hummel (GER)	Bence Halász (HUN)

==== Medal table ====
Rank	Nation	Gold	Silver	Bronze	Total
1	Poland (POL)	7	3	4	14
2	Soviet Union (URS)	3	3	0	6
3	Germany (GER)	2	2	1	5
4	Belarus (BLR)	2	2	0	4
5	Tajikistan (TJK)	2	1	0	3
6	Canada (CAN)	2	0	0	2
7	Japan (JPN)	1	1	1	3
7	Slovenia (SLO)	1	1	1	3
9	Hungary (HUN)	0	4	5	9
10	Ukraine (UKR)	0	1	1	2
11	France (FRA)	0	1	0	1
–	Authorised Neutral Athletes (ANA)	0	1	0	1
12	Russia (RUS)	0	0	3	3
13	Czech Republic (CZE)	0	0	1	1
13	East Germany (GDR)	0	0	1	1
13	Finland (FIN)	0	0	1	1
13	Norway (NOR)	0	0	1	1
13	Slovakia (SVK)	0	0	1	1
Totals (17 entries)		20	20	21	61

==== Multiple medalists ====
Rank	Athlete	Nation	Period	Gold	Silver	Bronze	Total
1	Paweł Fajdek	Poland (POL)	2013-2022	5	0	0	5
2	Szymon Ziółkowski	Poland (POL)	2001-2009	2	1	0	3
3	Sergey Litvinov	Soviet Union (URS)	1983-1987	2	0	0	2
3	Andrey Abduvaliyev	Tajikistan (TJK)	1993-1995	2	0	0	2
3	Ivan Tsikhan	Belarus (BLR)	2003-2007	2	0	0	2
3	Ethan Katzberg	Canada (CAN)	2023-2025	2	0	0	2
7	Koji Murofushi	Japan (JPN)	2001-2011	1	1	1	3
7	Primož Kozmus	Slovenia (SLO)	2007-2011	1	1	1	3
9	Heinz Weis	Germany (GER)	1991-1997	1	0	1	2
10	Igor Astapkovich	Soviet Union (URS); Belarus (BLR)	1991-1995	0	3	0	3
11	Wojciech Nowicki	Poland (POL)	2015-2023	0	2	3	5
12	Krisztián Pars	Hungary (HUN)	2011-2013	0	2	0	2
13	Bence Halász	Hungary (HUN)	2019-2025	0	0	3	3
14	Tibor Gécsek	Hungary (HUN)	1993-1995	0	0	2	2

=== Women ===
Championships	Gold	Silver	Bronze
1999 Seville	Mihaela Melinte (ROU)	Olga Kuzenkova (RUS)	Lisa Misipeka (ASA)
2001 Edmonton	Yipsi Moreno (CUB)	Olga Kuzenkova (RUS)	Bronwyn Eagles (AUS)
2003 Saint-Denis	Yipsi Moreno (CUB)	Olga Kuzenkova (RUS)	Manuela Montebrun (FRA)
2005 Helsinki	Yipsi Moreno (CUB)	Tatyana Lysenko (RUS)	Manuela Montebrun (FRA)
2007 Osaka	Betty Heidler (GER)	Yipsi Moreno (CUB)	Zhang Wenxiu (CHN)
2009 Berlin	Anita Włodarczyk (POL)	Betty Heidler (GER)	Martina Hrašnová (SVK)
2011 Daegu	Tatyana Lysenko (RUS)	Betty Heidler (GER)	Zhang Wenxiu (CHN)
2013 Moscow	Anita Włodarczyk (POL)	Zhang Wenxiu (CHN)	Wang Zheng (CHN)
2015 Beijing	Anita Włodarczyk (POL)	Zhang Wenxiu (CHN)	Alexandra Tavernier (FRA)
2017 London	Anita Włodarczyk (POL)	Wang Zheng (CHN)	Malwina Kopron (POL)
2019 Doha	DeAnna Price (USA)	Joanna Fiodorow (POL)	Wang Zheng (CHN)
2022 Eugene	Brooke Andersen (USA)	Camryn Rogers (CAN)	Janee' Kassanavoid (USA)
2023 Budapest	Camryn Rogers (CAN)	Janee' Kassanavoid (USA)	DeAnna Price (USA)
2025 Tokyo	Camryn Rogers (CAN)	Zhao Jie (PRC)	Zhang Jiale (PRC)

==== Medal table ====
Rank	Nation	Gold	Silver	Bronze	Total
1	Poland (POL)	4	1	1	6
2	Cuba (CUB)	3	1	0	4
3	United States (USA)	2	1	2	5
4	Canada (CAN)	2	1	0	3
5	Russia (RUS)	1	4	0	5
6	Germany (GER)	1	2	0	3
7	Romania (ROU)	1	0	0	1
8	China (CHN)	0	4	5	9
9	France (FRA)	0	0	3	3
10	American Samoa (ASA)	0	0	1	1
10	Australia (AUS)	0	0	1	1
10	Slovakia (SVK)	0	0	1	1

==== Multiple medalists ====
Rank	Athlete	Nation	Period	Gold	Silver	Bronze	Total
1	Anita Włodarczyk	Poland (POL)	2009-2017	4	0	0	4
2	Yipsi Moreno	Cuba (CUB)	2001-2007	3	1	0	4
3	Camryn Rogers	Canada (CAN)	2022-2025	2	1	0	3
4	Betty Heidler	Germany (GER)	2007-2011	1	2	0	3
5	Tatyana Lysenko	Russia (RUS)	2005-2011	1	1	0	2
6	DeAnna Price	United States (USA)	2019-2023	1	0	1	2
7	Olga Kuzenkova	Russia (RUS)	1999-2003	0	3	0	3
8	Zhang Wenxiu	China (CHN)	2007-2015	0	2	2	4
9	Wang Zheng	China (CHN)	2013-2019	0	1	2	3
10	Janee' Kassanavoid	United States (USA)	2022-2023	0	1	1	2
11	Manuela Montebrun	France (FRA)	2003-2005	0	0	2	2

== Championship record progression ==
=== Men ===
Men's hammer throw World Championships record progression
Mark	Athlete	Nation	Year	Round	Date
75.78 m	Zdzisław Kwaśny	Poland (POL)	1983	Qualification	1983-08-08
78.50 m	Sergey Litvinov	Soviet Union (URS)	1983	Qualification	1983-08-08
79.22 m	Yuriy Sedykh	Soviet Union (URS)	1983	Final	1983-08-08
82.68 m	Sergey Litvinov	Soviet Union (URS)	1983	Final	1983-08-08
83.06 m	Sergey Litvinov	Soviet Union (URS)	1987	Final	1987-09-01
83.38 m	Szymon Ziółkowski	Poland (POL)	2001	Final	2001-08-05
~~83.89 m~~^{1}	~~Ivan Tsikhan~~	~~Belarus (BLR)~~	~~2005~~	~~Final~~	~~2005-08-08~~
83.63 m	Ivan Tsikhan	Belarus (BLR)	2007	Final	2007-08-27
84.70 m	Ethan Katzberg	Canada (CAN)	2025	Final	2025-09-16

^{1}Subsequently disqualified after failing a doping test

=== Women ===
Women's hammer throw World Championships record progression
Time	Athlete	Nation	Year	Round	Date
65.52 m	Debbie Sosimenko	Australia (AUS)	1999	Final	1999-08-24
71.57 m	Mihaela Melinte	Romania (ROM)	1999	Final	1999-08-24
73.23 m	Mihaela Melinte	Romania (ROM)	1999	Final	1999-08-24
75.20 m	Mihaela Melinte	Romania (ROM)	1999	Final	1999-08-24
75.27 m	Betty Heidler	Germany (GER)	2009	Qualification	2009-08-20
77.96 m WR	Anita Włodarczyk	Poland (POL)	2009	Final	2009-08-22
78.46 m	Anita Włodarczyk	Poland (POL)	2013	Final	2013-08-16
~~78.80 m~~^{1}	~~Tatyana Lysenko~~	~~Russia (RUS)~~	~~2013~~	~~Final~~	~~2013-08-16~~
78.52 m	Anita Włodarczyk	Poland (POL)	2015	Final	2015-08-27
80.27 m	Anita Włodarczyk	Poland (POL)	2015	Final	2015-08-27
80.85 m	Anita Włodarczyk	Poland (POL)	2015	Final	2015-08-27

^{1}Subsequently disqualified after failing a doping test.

== Best performances ==
=== Top ten furthest World Championship throws^{1} ===
Furthest men's throws at the World Championships
Rank	Distance (m)	Athlete	Nation	Year	Date
1	84.70 m	Ethan Katzberg	Canada	2025	2025-09-16
2	83.63 m	Ivan Tsikhan	Belarus	2007	2007-08-27
3	83.38 m	Szymon Ziółkowski	Poland	2001	2001-08-05
4	83.07 m	Sergey Litvinov	Soviet Union	1987	1987-09-01
5	83.05 m	Ivan Tsikhan	Belarus	2003	2003-08-25
6	82.92 m	Koji Murofushi	Japan	2001	2001-08-05
7	82.77 m	Merlin Hummel	Germany	2025	2025-09-16
8	82.69 m	Bence Halász	Hungary	2025	2025-09-16
9	82.68 m	Sergey Litvinov	Soviet Union	1983	1983-08-09
10	82.60 m	Vadim Devyatovskiy	Belarus	2005	2005-08-08

Furthest women's throws at the World Championships
Rank	Distance (m)	Athlete	Nation	Year	Date
1	80.85 m	Anita Włodarczyk	Poland	2015	2015-08-27
2	80.51 m	Camryn Rogers	Canada	2025	2025-09-15
3	78.96 m	Brooke Andersen	United States	2022	2022-07-17
4	78.46 m	Anita Włodarczyk	Poland	2013	2013-08-16
5	77.96 m	Anita Włodarczyk	Poland	2009	2009-08-22
6	77.90 m	Anita Włodarczyk	Poland	2017	2017-08-07
7	77.60 m	Zhao Jie	China	2025	2025-09-15
8	77.54 m	DeAnna Price	United States	2019	2019-09-28
9	77.52 m	Camryn Rogers	Canada	2025^{Q}	2025-09-15
10	77.22 m	Camryn Rogers	Canada	2023	2023-08-24

^{1}Does not include ancillary marks

== See also ==
- Hammer throw
- Hammer throw at the Olympics

== Bibliography ==
- Butler, Mark (2023). World Athletics Championships Budapest 2023 Statistics Book. World Athletics.
