= 2003 World Championships in Athletics – Men's hammer throw =

These are the official results of the Men's Hammer Throw event at the 2003 World Championships in Paris, France. There were a total number of 26 participating athletes, with the final held on Monday 25 August 2003.

== Medalists ==
Gold	Ivan Tsikhan; Belarus (BLR)
Silver	Adrián Annus; Hungary (HUN)
Bronze	Koji Murofushi; Japan (JPN)

== Schedule ==
- All times are Central European Time (UTC+1)

Qualification Round
Group A	Group B
23.08.2003 – 09:30h	23.08.2003 – 11:00h
Final Round
25.08.2003 – 18:00h

== Abbreviations ==
- All results shown are in metres

Q	automatic qualification
q	qualification by rank
DNS	did not start
NM	no mark
WR	world record
AR	area record
NR	national record
PB	personal best
SB	season best

== Records ==
Standing records prior to the 2003 World Athletics Championships
World Record	Yuriy Sedykh (URS)	86.74 m	August 30, 1986	Stuttgart, West Germany
Event Record	Szymon Ziółkowski (POL)	83.38 m	August 5, 2001	Edmonton, Canada
Season Best	Koji Murofushi (JPN)	84.86 m	June 29, 2003	Prague, Czech Republic

== Qualification ==
=== Group A ===
Rank	Overall	Athlete	Attempts			Distance
Rank	Overall	Athlete	1	2	3	Distance
1	1	Igor Astapkovich (BLR)	77.11	77.48	79.66	79.66 m
2	3	Koji Murofushi (JPN)	77.50	79.45	—	79.45 m
3	5	Ilya Konovalov (RUS)	78.45	—	—	78.45 m
4	8	Primož Kozmus (SLO)	X	76.88	78.10	78.10 m
5	8	Alexandros Papadimitriou (GRE)	75.82	77.53	75.95	77.53 m
6	10	Nicolas Figère (FRA)	76.79	76.26	X	76.79 m
7	13	Libor Charfreitag (SVK)	76.52	76.14	X	76.52 m
8	14	Olli-Pekka Karjalainen (FIN)	X	76.20	75.79	76.20 m
9	15	Nicola Vizzoni (ITA)	74.25	73.86	75.76	75.76 m
10	18	Maciej Pałyszko (POL)	75.20	X	75.42	75.42 m
11	19	Péter Botfa (HUN)	73.10	74.75	74.74	74.75 m
12	20	Sergey Kirmasov (RUS)	X	74.17	72.91	74.17 m
13	21	Oleksandr Krykun (UKR)	70.38	72.97	73.58	73.58 m

=== Group B ===
Rank	Overall	Athlete	Attempts			Distance
Rank	Overall	Athlete	1	2	3	Distance
1	2	Ivan Tsikhan (BLR)	X	79.64	—	79.64 m
2	4	Andriy Skvaruk (UKR)	76.77	78.50	—	78.50 m
3	2	Adrián Annus (HUN)	78.20	—	—	78.20 m
4	7	Vadim Devyatovskiy (BLR)	75.07	76.46	78.12	78.12 m
5	11	Miloslav Konopka (SVK)	76.58	73.55	75.81	76.58 m
6	12	Stuart Rendell (AUS)	75.57	76.56	X	76.56 m
7	16	Vladyslav Piskunov (UKR)	73.43	74.73	75.65	75.65 m
8	17	Karsten Kobs (GER)	75.21	74.90	75.55	75.55 m
9	22	Aleksey Zagornyi (RUS)	X	72.36	73.30	73.30 m
10	23	Christophe Épalle (FRA)	X	72.82	X	72.82 m
11	24	Juan Ignacio Cerra (ARG)	72.70	X	71.86	72.70 m
12	25	Wojciech Kondratowicz (POL)	X	70.79	X	70.79 m
—	—	Vladimír Maška (CZE)	X	X	X	DNS

== Final ==
Rank	Athlete	Attempts						Distance	Note
Rank	Athlete	1	2	3	4	5	6	Distance	Note
1st place, gold medalist(s)	Ivan Tsikhan (BLR)	X	80.69	81.77	X	X	83.05	83.05 m	
2nd place, silver medalist(s)	Adrián Annus (HUN)	77.26	78.48	79.22	79.01	78.49	80.36	80.36 m	
3rd place, bronze medalist(s)	Koji Murofushi (JPN)	79.87	78.64	79.99	79.91	80.12	79.07	80.12 m	
4	Andriy Skvaruk (UKR)	78.80	79.68	77.70	X	X	X	79.68 m	
5	Primož Kozmus (SLO)	78.16	X	78.00	74.76	78.72	79.68	79.68 m	
6	Ilya Konovalov (RUS)	76.49	X	76.06	76.81	76.10	78.55	78.55 m	
7	Vadim Devyatovskiy (BLR)	78.13	76.81	77.63	X	73.99	X	78.13 m	
8	Alexandros Papadimitriou (GRE)	75.62	77.79	77.05	77.70	X	75.62	77.79 m	
9	Miloslav Konopka (SVK)	75.86	75.18	X				75.86 m	
10	Stuart Rendell (AUS)	73.14	75.72	75.54				75.72 m	
11	Nicolas Figère (FRA)	73.97	70.98	74.06				74.06 m	
—	Igor Astapkovich (BLR)	X	X	X				NM	

== See also ==
- Athletics at the 2003 Pan American Games - Men's hammer throw
- 2003 Hammer Throw Year Ranking
