= 2001 World Championships in Athletics – Men's hammer throw =

The final of the Men's Hammer Throw event at the 2001 World Championships in Edmonton, Alberta, Canada was held on Sunday August 5, 2001. There were a total number of 32 participating athletes. The qualifying rounds were staged on Saturday August 4, with the mark set at 79.50 metres.

== Medalists ==
Gold	Szymon Ziółkowski; Poland (POL)
Silver	Koji Murofushi; Japan (JPN)
Bronze	Ilya Konovalov; Russia (RUS)

== Schedule ==
- All times are Mountain Standard Time (UTC-7)

Qualification Round
Group A	Group B
04.08.2001 – 10:00h	04.08.2001 – 12:08h
Final Round
05.08.2001 – 16:40h

== Abbreviations ==
- All results shown are in metres

Q	automatic qualification
q	qualification by rank
DNS	did not start
NM	no mark
WR	world record
AR	area record
NR	national record
PB	personal best
SB	season best

== Startlist ==
Order	№	Athlete	Season Best	Personal Best
GROUP A
1	1185	Kevin McMahon (USA)	76.52	79.26
2	480	Karsten Kobs (GER)	79.15	82.78
3	24	Juan Ignacio Cerra (ARG)	76.42	76.42
4	602	Loris Paoluzzi (ITA)	75.33	80.98
5	1048	Miloslav Konopka (SVK)	78.58	78.58
6	46	Stuart Rendell (AUS)	78.93	78.93
7	908	Szymon Ziółkowski (POL)	83.38	83.38
8	1125	Vladyslav Piskunov (UKR)	79.60	81.56
9	536	Adrián Annus (HUN)	83.39	83.39
10	505	Alexandros Papadimitriou (GRE)	79.52	80.45
11	540	Balázs Kiss (HUN)	81.36	83.00
12	1120	Oleksandr Krykun (UKR)	80.38	80.38
13	113	Ivan Tikhon (BLR)	75.92	79.85
14	377	Nicolas Figère (FRA)	80.88	80.88
15	972	Sergey Kirmasov (RUS)	80.07	82.62
16	435	Michael Jones (GBR)	76.43	76.43
GROUP B
1	105	Igor Astapkovich (BLR)	79.72	84.62
2	1045	Libor Charfreitag (SVK)	77.65	77.65
3	1128	Andriy Skvaruk (UKR)	82.34	82.34
4	974	Ilya Konovalov (RUS)	80.27	80.51
5	1055	Bengt Johansson (SWE)	76.32	76.32
6	478	Holger Klose (GER)	78.63	82.22
7	539	Tibor Gécsek (HUN)	81.76	83.68
8	353	Olli-Pekka Karjalainen (FIN)	78.66	80.55
9	151	Dylan Armstrong (CAN)	69.48	70.66
10	604	Nicola Vizzoni (ITA)	80.50	80.50
11	897	Maciej Pałyszko (POL)	79.29	80.25
12	992	Vasiliy Sidorenko (RUS)	80.03	82.54
13	259	Vladimír Maška (CZE)	80.09	81.28
14	651	Koji Murofushi (JPN)	83.47	83.47
15	506	Hristos Polihroniou (GRE)	78.34	79.83
16	370	David Chaussinand (FRA)	79.48	79.81

== Records ==
Standing records prior to the 2001 World Athletics Championships
World Record	Yuriy Sedykh (URS)	86.74 m	August 30, 1986	Stuttgart, West Germany
Event Record	Sergey Litvinov (URS)	83.06 m	September 1, 1987	Rome, Italy
Season Best	Koji Murofushi (JPN)	83.47 m	July 14, 2001	Toyota, Japan
Broken records during the 2001 World Athletics Championships
Event Record	Szymon Ziółkowski (POL)	83.38 m	August 5, 2001	Edmonton, Canada

== Qualification ==
=== Group A ===
Rank	Overall	Athlete	Attempts			Distance	Note
Rank	Overall	Athlete	1	2	3	Distance	Note
1	1	Szymon Ziółkowski (POL)	X	81.85	—	81.85 m	
2	2	Balázs Kiss (HUN)	78.09	77.22	79.60	79.60 m	
3	4	Nicolas Figère (FRA)	79.09	77.23	X	79.09 m	
4	9	Adrián Annus (HUN)	78.57	78.15	77.95	78.57 m	
5	14	Vladyslav Piskunov (UKR)	75.75	76.34	X	76.34 m	
6	15	Sergey Kirmasov (RUS)	75.79	X	74.84	75.79 m	
7	16	Alexandros Papadimitriou (GRE)	75.60	74.21	75.63	75.63 m	
8	17	Kevin McMahon (USA)	71.77	75.62	70.64	75.62 m	
9	19	Stuart Rendell (AUS)	73.14	75.00	X	75.00 m	
10	20	Loris Paoluzzi (ITA)	72.01	X	74.75	74.75 m	
11	22	Oleksandr Krykun (UKR)	73.44	74.43	X	74.43 m	
12	23	Ivan Tikhon (BLR)	X	74.43	X	74.43 m	
13	27	Michael Jones (GBR)	X	73.31	X	73.31 m	
14	28	Miloslav Konopka (SVK)	72.14	X	X	72.14 m	
15	29	Juan Ignacio Cerra (ARG)	70.70	69.92	68.23	70.70 m	
—	—	Karsten Kobs (GER)	—	—	—	DNS	

=== Group B ===
Rank	Overall	Athlete	Attempts			Distance	Note
Rank	Overall	Athlete	1	2	3	Distance	Note
1	3	Tibor Gécsek (HUN)	77.50	79.29	—	79.29 m	
2	5	Olli-Pekka Karjalainen (FIN)	78.82	75.91	78.78	78.82 m	
3	6	Andriy Skvaruk (UKR)	77.34	X	78.80	78.80 m	
4	7	Ilya Konovalov (RUS)	78.67	76.97	75.99	78.67 m	
5	8	Nicola Vizzoni (ITA)	78.66	X	78.52	78.66 m	
6	10	Koji Murofushi (JPN)	77.69	78.06	76.69	78.06 m	
7	11	Igor Astapkovich (BLR)	74.84	76.99	75.69	76.99 m	SB
8	12	Maciej Pałyszko (POL)	76.72	75.91	75.53	76.72 m	
9	13	David Chaussinand (FRA)	76.02	X	76.66	76.66 m	
10	18	Libor Charfreitag (SVK)	74.78	71.39	75.29	75.29 m	
11	21	Vasiliy Sidorenko (RUS)	74.56	72.29	73.86	74.56 m	
12	24	Vladimír Maška (CZE)	74.20	X	X	74.20 m	
13	25	Holger Klose (GER)	X	74.02	X	74.02 m	
14	26	Hristos Polihroniou (GRE)	73.79	X	72.30	73.79 m	
15	30	Bengt Johansson (SWE)	X	70.16	67.22	70.16 m	
16	31	Dylan Armstrong (CAN)	63.89	63.69	X	63.89 m	

== Final ==
Rank	Athlete	Attempts						Distance	Note
Rank	Athlete	1	2	3	4	5	6	Distance	Note
1st place, gold medalist(s)	Szymon Ziółkowski (POL)	81.88	79.69	X	80.32	83.38	80.39	83.38 m	CR
2nd place, silver medalist(s)	Koji Murofushi (JPN)	79.91	82.46	81.95	81.43	82.92	82.61	82.92 m	
3rd place, bronze medalist(s)	Ilya Konovalov (RUS)	80.27	79.42	79.09	78.94	76.26	X	80.27 m	SB
4	Nicola Vizzoni (ITA)	79.12	72.42	78.46	X	80.13	X	80.13 m	
5	Andriy Skvaruk (UKR)	77.95	X	79.93	X	X	X	79.93 m	
6	Balázs Kiss (HUN)	79.22	78.44	X	79.75	79.54	X	79.75 m	
7	Igor Astapkovich (BLR)	X	78.35	79.20	79.72	78.57	X	79.72 m	SB
8	Tibor Gécsek (HUN)	78.15	X	X	78.24	76.86	79.34	79.34 m	
9	Adrián Annus (HUN)	77.86	75.92	78.10				78.10 m	
10	Olli-Pekka Karjalainen (FIN)	X	76.76	75.86				76.76 m	
11	Maciej Pałyszko (POL)	74.81	75.34	75.94				75.94 m	
12	Nicolas Figère (FRA)	X	75.36	X				75.36 m	

== See also ==
- 2000 Men's Olympic Hammer Throw (Sydney)
- 2002 Men's European Championships Hammer Throw (Munich)
- 2001 Hammer Throw Year Ranking
- 2004 Men's Olympic Hammer Throw (Athens)
