= 2002 European Athletics Championships – Men's hammer throw =

Men's hammer throw at the European Athletics Championships

The final of the Men's hammer throw event at the 2002 European Championships in Munich, Germany was held on August 7, 2002. There were a total number of 31 participating athletes. The qualifying rounds were staged a day earlier, on August 6, with the mark set in 79.00 metres.

== Medalists ==
Gold	Adrián Annus; Hungary (HUN)
Silver	Vladyslav Piskunov; Ukraine (UKR)
Bronze	Alexandros Papadimitriou; Greece (GRE)

== Abbreviations ==
- All results shown are in metres

Q	automatic qualification
q	qualification by rank
DNS	did not start
NM	no mark
WR	world record
AR	area record
NR	national record
PB	personal best
SB	season best

== Records ==
Standing records prior to the 2002 European Athletics Championships
World Record	Yuriy Sedykh (URS)	86.74 m	August 30, 1986	Stuttgart, West Germany
Event Record	Yuriy Sedykh (URS)	86.74 m	August 30, 1986	Stuttgart, West Germany

== Qualification ==
=== Group A ===
Rank	Overall	Athlete	Attempts			Distance
Rank	Overall	Athlete	1	2	3	Distance
1	1	Aleksey Zagornyi (RUS)				80.16 m
2	3	Adrián Annus (HUN)				79.82 m
3	7	Nicolas Figère (FRA)				78.50 m
4	8	Alexandros Papadimitriou (GRE)				78.39 m
5	9	Ivan Tikhon (BLR)				78.24 m
6	10	Miloslav Konopka (SVK)				78.16 m
7	11	Vladyslav Piskunov (UKR)				78.06 m
8	13	Nicola Vizzoni (ITA)				77.57 m
9	14	Karsten Kobs (GER)				77.44 m
10	15	Szymon Ziółkowski (POL)				77.17 m
11	17	Holger Klose (GER)				76.98 m
12	20	Ilya Konovalov (RUS)				76.79 m
13	23	David Söderberg (FIN)				74.64 m
14	24	Vladimír Maška (CZE)				74.52 m
15	28	Bengt Johansson (SWE)				71.27 m
16	30	Dorian Collaku (ALB)				67.47 m

=== Group B ===
Rank	Overall	Athlete	Attempts			Distance
Rank	Overall	Athlete	1	2	3	Distance
1	2	Andriy Skvaruk (UKR)				79.96 m
2	4	Balázs Kiss (HUN)				79.32 m
3	5	Libor Charfreitag (SVK)				79.18 m
4	6	Tibor Gécsek (HUN)				79.03 m
5	12	Olli-Pekka Karjalainen (FIN)				77.78 m
6	16	Vadim Khersontsev (RUS)				77.00 m
7	18	Oleksandr Krykun (UKR)				76.92 m
8	19	Jan Bielecki (DEN)				76.82 m
9	21	Christophe Épalle (FRA)				76.27 m
10	22	Maciej Pałyszko (POL)				75.51 m
11	25	Primož Kozmus (SLO)				72.60 m
12	26	Vítor Costa (POR)				72.43 m
13	27	Christos Polychroniou (GRE)				71.70 m
14	29	Markus Esser (GER)				70.15 m
—	—	András Haklits (CRO)	X	X	X	NM

== Final ==
Rank	Athlete	Attempts						Distance	Note
Rank	Athlete	1	2	3	4	5	6	Distance	Note
1st place, gold medalist(s)	Adrián Annus (HUN)	76.00	78.65	80.62	81.17	80.37	—	81.17 m	
2nd place, silver medalist(s)	Vladyslav Piskunov (UKR)	X	78.23	79.58	X	80.39	X	80.39 m	
3rd place, bronze medalist(s)	Alexandros Papadimitriou (GRE)	76.81	78.31	78.51	77.86	80.21	78.61	80.21 m	
4	Balázs Kiss (HUN)	80.13	X	80.17	X	80.06	80.05	80.17 m	
5	Andriy Skvaruk (UKR)	79.22	X	80.15	78.68	X	79.23	80.15 m	
6	Tibor Gécsek (HUN)	79.25	78.62	X	X	76.91	78.52	79.25 m	
7	Libor Charfreitag (SVK)	79.20	X	X	X	76.93	X	79.20 m	
8	Olli-Pekka Karjalainen (FIN)	X	78.41	78.57	X	X	X	78.57 m	
9	Ivan Tsikhan (BLR)	72.60	77.86	X				77.86 m	
10	Miloslav Konopka (SVK)	76.69	76.94	77.33				77.33 m	
11	Aleksey Zagornyi (RUS)	77.01	X	X				77.01 m	
12	Nicolas Figère (FRA)	76.17	X	76.49				76.49 m	

== See also ==
- 2000 Men's Olympic Hammer Throw (Sydney)
- 2001 Men's World Championships Hammer Throw (Edmonton)
- 2002 Hammer Throw Year Ranking
- 2003 Men's World Championships Hammer Throw (Paris)
- 2004 Men's Olympic Hammer Throw (Athens)
