= 2001 European Athletics U23 Championships – Men's hammer throw =

The men's hammer throw event at the 2001 European Athletics U23 Championships was held in Amsterdam, Netherlands, at Olympisch Stadion on 14 and 15 July.

== Medalists ==
Gold	Nicolas Figère; France
Silver	Olli-Pekka Karjalainen; Finland
Bronze	Miloslav Konopka; Slovakia

== Results ==
=== Final ===
15 July

Rank	Name	Nationality	Attempts						Result	Notes
Rank	Name	Nationality	1	2	3	4	5	6	Result	Notes
1st place, gold medalist(s)	Nicolas Figère	France	75.66	x	79.92	74.32	76.04	80.88	80.88	CR
2nd place, silver medalist(s)	Olli-Pekka Karjalainen	Finland	78.34	x	x	78.76	80.54	x	80.54	
3rd place, bronze medalist(s)	Miloslav Konopka	Slovakia	75.33	75.64	76.28	75.28	73.94	x	76.28	
4	Wojciech Kondratowicz	Poland	74.29	75.29	x	71.78	73.51	73.04	75.29	
5	Dzmitry Shako	Belarus	71.95	73.00	x	74.57	73.14	x	74.57	
6	Yuriy Voronkin	Russia	71.89	72.49	71.88	x	72.44	68.29	72.49	
7	Markus Esser	Germany	71.99	x	68.97	72.36	70.70	67.69	72.36	
8	Moisés Campeny	Spain	69.50	x	71.19	70.35	70.79	65.57	71.19	
9	Péter Botfa	Hungary	70.62	70.94	69.39				70.94	
10	Aleksandr Vashchilo	Belarus	67.53	x	x				67.53	
11	Lukáš Melich	Czech Republic	x	66.41	65.99				66.41	
	David Söderberg	Finland	x	x	x				NM	

=== Qualifications ===
14 July
Qualifying 72.00 or 12 best to the Final

==== Group A ====
Rank	Name	Nationality	Result	Notes
1	Dmitriy Shako	Belarus	74.37	Q
2	Markus Esser	Germany	73.35	Q
3	Moisés Campeny	Spain	71.71	q
4	Péter Botfa	Hungary	70.70	q
5	David Söderberg	Finland	70.62	q
6	Marco Felice	Italy	68.24	
7	Primož Kozmus	Slovenia	68.11	
8	Xavier Dallet	France	66.62	
	Iulian Ocheana	Romania	NM	

==== Group B ====
Rank	Name	Nationality	Result	Notes
1	Olli-Pekka Karjalainen	Finland	79.19	Q
2	Miloslav Konopka	Slovakia	74.29	Q
3	Wojciech Kondratowicz	Poland	73.97	Q
4	Nicolas Figère	France	72.97	Q
5	Yuriy Voronkin	Russia	72.40	Q
6	Aleksandr Vashchilo	Belarus	70.19	q
7	Lukáš Melich	Czech Republic	69.35	q
8	Benjamin Boruschewski	Germany	68.18	
9	Alessandro Beschi	Italy	65.30	
10	Eric Albert	France	64.76	

== Participation ==
According to an unofficial count, 19 athletes from 13 countries participated in the event.

- Belarus (2)
- Czech Republic (1)
- Finland (2)
- France (3)
- Germany (2)
- Hungary (1)
- Italy (2)
- Poland (1)
- Romania (1)
- Russia (1)
- Slovakia (1)
- Slovenia (1)
- Spain (1)
