= 2010 European Athletics Championships – Men's hammer throw =

Men's hammer throw at the European Athletics Championships

The men's hammer throw at the 2010 European Athletics Championships was held at the Estadi Olímpic Lluís Companys on 27 and 28 July.

== Medalists ==
Gold	Libor Charfreitag; Slovakia
Silver	Nicola Vizzoni; Italy
Bronze	Krisztián Pars; Hungary

== Records ==
Standing records prior to the 2010 European Athletics Championships
World record	Yuriy Sedykh (URS)	86.74	Stuttgart, West Germany	30 August 1986
European record	Yuriy Sedykh (URS)	86.74	Stuttgart, West Germany	30 August 1986
Championship record	Yuriy Sedykh (URS)	86.74	Stuttgart, West Germany	30 August 1986
World Leading	Libor Charfreitag (SVK)	80.59	Walnut, United States	17 April 2010
European Leading	Libor Charfreitag (SVK)	80.59	Walnut, United States	17 April 2010

== Schedule ==
Date	Time	Round
27 July 2010	9:30	Qualification
28 July 2010	20:25	Final

== Results ==
=== Qualification ===
Qualification: Qualification Performance 75.50 (Q) or at least 12 best performers advance to the final.

Rank	Group	Athlete	Nationality	#1	#2	#3	Result	Notes
1	B	Libor Charfreitag	Slovakia	77.70			77.70	Q
2	A	Krisztián Pars	Hungary	74.23	71.06	76.48	76.48	Q
3	B	Nicolas Figère	France	75.85			75.85	Q
4	A	Szymon Ziółkowski	Poland	75.75			75.75	Q
5	A	Nicola Vizzoni	Italy	74.10	75.04	73.73	75.04	q
6	A	Igor Vinichenko	Russia	71.59	71.60	74.88	74.88	q
7	B	Valeri Sviatokha	Belarus	x	74.66	74.50	74.66	q
8	B	Mattias Jons	Sweden	71.30	x	74.56	74.56	q
9	B	Kristóf Németh	Hungary	69.76	69.94	74.28	74.28	q
10	A	Olli-Pekka Karjalainen	Finland	72.31	74.23	71.99	74.23	q
11	B	Wojciech Kondratowicz	Poland	74.22	74.10	72.76	74.22	q
12	B	Oleksiy Sokyrskyy	Ukraine	74.16	73.80	x	74.16	q
13	A	David Söderberg	Finland	x	x	73.87	73.87	
14	B	Igors Sokolovs	Latvia	71.24	73.29	70.69	73.29	
15	B	Tuomas Seppänen	Finland	72.94	x	70.56	72.94	
16	A	Pavel Kryvitski	Belarus	x	x	72.68	72.68	
17	B	Dzmitry Marshyn	Azerbaijan	71.29	67.55	72.43	72.43	
18	B	Javier Cienfuegos	Spain	70.27	72.19	71.28	72.19	SB
19	B	Markus Esser	Germany	x	71.83	71.89	71.89	
20	A	Yury Shayunou	Belarus	71.10	x	x	71.10	
21	A	András Haklits	Croatia	x	70.84	69.25	70.84	
22	B	Eivind Henriksen	Norway	69.98	x	66.71	69.98	
23	A	Miloslav Konopka	Slovakia	68.77	x	x	68.77	
24	A	Marcel Lomnicky	Slovakia	68.22	68.02	x	68.22	
25	A	Ainārs Vaičulēns	Latvia	65.43	x	x	65.43	

=== Final ===
Rank	Athlete	Nationality	#1	#2	#3	#4	#5	#6	Result	Notes
1st place, gold medalist(s)	Libor Charfreitag	Slovakia	75.50	80.02	x	x	77.29	–	80.02	
2nd place, silver medalist(s)	Nicola Vizzoni	Italy	75.72	77.29	78.03	77.66	77.95	79.12	79.12	SB
3rd place, bronze medalist(s)	Krisztián Pars	Hungary	77.34	79.06	77.36	78.94	x	77.87	79.06	
4	Valeri Sviatokha	Belarus	73.57	76.74	x	75.71	76.06	78.20	78.20	
5	Szymon Ziółkowski	Poland	75.24	75.97	77.99	x	77.55	75.45	77.99	SB
6	Oleksiy Sokyrskyy	Ukraine	73.14	x	75.36	76.62	x	x	76.62	PB
7	Wojciech Kondratowicz	Poland	74.96	x	x	72.87	72.78	75.30	75.30	
8	Igor Vinichenko	Russia	x	72.19	73.99	72.38	74.31	73.31	74.31	
9	Kristóf Németh	Hungary	72.66	73.93	x				73.93	
10	Olli-Pekka Karjalainen	Finland	73.35	73.70	73.30				73.70	
11	Nicolas Figère	France	69.77	72.56	x				72.56	
	Mattias Jons	Sweden	x	x	x				NM	
