= 2009 World Championships in Athletics – Men's hammer throw =

The Men's Hammer Throw event at the 2009 World Championships in Athletics was held at the Olympic Stadium on August 15 and August 17. With reigning champion Ivan Tsikhan banned from competition for doping offences, the 2008 Olympic gold and silver medallists Primož Kozmus and Krisztián Pars were the favourites in the event. Pars entered the competition with a world-leading throw of 81.43 m and an 18 competition win-streak. Belarusian Yuriy Shayunov and Russian Aleksey Zagornyi, the only other athletes to have thrown over eighty metres twice that season prior to the championships, were identified as possible podium finishers. Nicola Vizzoni, Igor Sokolov, Olli-Pekka Karjalainen, Szymon Ziółkowski, Koji Murofushi, and Libor Charfreitag were all predicted to have an outside chance of a medal.

On the first day of competition, Kozmus was the first to pass the automatic qualifying mark of 77.50 m. Pars had the best effort of the day with 78.68 m, while former world champion Ziółkowski led group A with a throw of 77.89 m. Aspiring medallists Sokolov, Shayunov and Karjalainen all failed to progress to the final of the competition. On the final day of the hammer throw, the favourite Kozmus delivered a best of 80.15 m to take the gold medal, Slovenia's first ever in the World Championships. Ziółkowski's 79.30 m, the best of his season, was enough to take the silver – his first medal at a major championships since 2005. The level of the competition, however, failed to live up to expectations: the world-leader Pars started poorly and, after a number of fouls, he never regained ground and finished in fourth place. Furthermore, the performance of bronze medallist Zagornyi (78.09) was the shortest-ever distance of a medal winner in championship history.

== Medalists ==
Gold	Primož Kozmus; Slovenia (SLO)
Silver	Szymon Ziółkowski; Poland (POL)
Bronze	Aleksey Zagornyi; Russia (RUS)

== Abbreviations ==
- All results shown are in metres

Q	automatic qualification
q	qualification by rank
DNS	did not start
NM	no mark
WR	world record
AR	area record
NR	national record
PB	personal best
SB	season best

== Records ==
World record	Yuriy Sedykh (URS)	86.74	Stuttgart, West Germany	30 August 1986
Championship record	Ivan Tsikhan (BLR)	83.89	Helsinki, Finland	8 August 2005
World Leading	Krisztián Pars (HUN)	81.43	Veszprém, Hungary	25 April 2009
African record	Chris Harmse (RSA)	80.63	Durban, South Africa	15 April 2004
Asian record	Koji Murofushi (JPN)	84.86	Prague, Czech Republic	29 June 2003
North American record	Lance Deal (USA)	82.52	Milan, Italy	7 September 1996
South American record	Juan Ignacio Cerra (ARG)	76.42	Trieste, Italy	25 July 2001
European record	Yuriy Sedykh (URS)	86.74	Stuttgart, West Germany	30 August 1986
Oceanian record	Stuart Rendell (AUS)	79.29	Varaždin, Croatia	6 July 2002

== Qualification standards ==
A standard	B standard
77.50m	74.30m

== Schedule ==
Date	Time	Round
August 15, 2009	12:00	Qualification
August 17, 2009	18:05	Final

== Results ==
=== Qualification ===
Qualification: Qualifying Performance 77.50 (Q) or at least 12 best performers (q) advance to the final.

Rank	Group	Athlete	Nationality	#1	#2	#3	Result	Notes
1	B	Krisztián Pars	Hungary	72.94	78.68		78.68	Q
2	A	Szymon Ziółkowski	Poland	77.89			77.89	Q
3	B	Pavel Kryvitski	Belarus	70.70	72.14	77.85	77.85	Q
4	A	Sergey Lytvynov Jr.	Germany	77.68			77.68	Q
5	A	Primož Kozmus	Slovenia	77.55			77.55	Q
6	A	Igor Vinichenko	Russia	77.54			77.54	Q
7	A	Nicola Vizzoni	Italy	76.71	x	76.95	76.95	q
8	B	Markus Esser	Germany	76.81	76.67	x	76.81	q
9	A	András Haklits	Croatia	75.50	76.39	75.73	76.39	q
10	B	Libor Charfreitag	Slovakia	69.71	75.39	76.29	76.29	q
11	A	Dilshod Nazarov	Tajikistan	73.84	74.73	75.83	75.83	q
12	B	Aleksey Zagornyi	Russia	75.38	74.93	73.75	75.38	q
13	A	Ali Al-Zinkawi	Kuwait	x	73.82	75.10	75.10	
14	B	Lukáš Melich	Czech Republic	74.40	72.98	74.47	74.47	
15	B	Thomas J. Freeman	United States	71.38	74.19	72.58	74.19	
16	A	Olli-Pekka Karjalainen	Finland	x	73.25	74.09	74.09	
17	B	Igors Sokolovs	Latvia	73.96	73.97	73.12	73.97	
18	B	David Söderberg	Finland	73.69	73.14	73.56	73.69	
19	B	Jérôme Bortoluzzi	France	x	73.09	70.69	73.09	
20	A	Mohsen El Anany	Egypt	71.42	72.68	72.05	72.68	
21	A	Michael Mai	United States	72.58	x	67.47	72.58	
22	B	Olexiy Sokyrskiyy	Ukraine	70.67	x	72.56	72.56	
23	B	Alexandros Papadimitriou	Greece	x	x	72.02	72.02	
24	B	Javier Cienfuegos	Spain	69.60	71.63	72.01	72.01	
25	B	Dzmitry Shako	Belarus	71.80	70.57	x	71.80	
26	A	Yury Shayunou	Belarus	71.37	x	x	71.37	
27	B	Eşref Apak	Turkey	x	70.70	x	70.70	
28	A	A. G. Kruger	United States	67.40	x	70.19	70.19	
29	A	Artem Rubanko	Ukraine	x	69.81	x	69.81	
30	B	Juan Ignacio Cerra	Argentina	66.77	67.98	69.37	69.37	
31	B	Bergur Ingi Pétursson	Iceland	67.32	68.62	x	68.62	
32	A	Ainārs Vaičulens	Latvia	65.70	66.89	x	66.89	
33	A	Amanmurad Hommadov	Turkmenistan	57.39	56.46	x	57.39	
	A	Chris Harmse	South Africa	x	x	x	NM	

Key: NM = no mark (i.e. no valid result), Q = qualification by place in heat, q = qualification by overall place

=== Final ===
Rank	Athlete	Nationality	#1	#2	#3	#4	#5	#6	Result	Notes
1st place, gold medalist(s)	Primož Kozmus	Slovenia	75.14	79.74	77.21	79.28	80.15	80.84	80.84	SB
2nd place, silver medalist(s)	Szymon Ziółkowski	Poland	77.44	79.30	77.85	77.66	78.09	76.89	79.30	SB
3rd place, bronze medalist(s)	Aleksey Zagornyi	Russia	76.11	x	77.42	x	75.11	78.09	78.09	
4	Krisztián Pars	Hungary	75.51	x	x	77.45	x	x	77.45	
5	Sergej Litvinov	Germany	74.50	74.49	75.88	76.58	76.00	74.45	76.58	
6	Markus Esser	Germany	68.07	76.27	74.07	x	x	x	76.27	
7	András Haklits	Croatia	72.60	75.12	75.09	x	74.82	76.26	76.26	
8	Pavel Kryvitski	Belarus	73.72	x	72.73	x	x	76.00	76.00	
9	Nicola Vizzoni	Italy	x	x	73.70				73.70	
10	Libor Charfreitag	Slovakia	x	72.63	x				72.63	
11	Dilshod Nazarov	Tajikistan	x	x	71.69				71.69	
	Igor Vinichenko	Russia	x	x	x				NM	

Key: NM = no mark (i.e. no valid result), SB = Seasonal best

== See also ==
- 2009 Hammer Throw Year Ranking
