= 1998 World Junior Championships in Athletics – Men's hammer throw =

The men's hammer throw event at the 1998 World Junior Championships in Athletics was held in Annecy, France, at Parc des Sports on 31 July and 1 August. A 7257g (senior implement) hammer was used.

== Medalists ==
Gold	Olli-Pekka Karjalainen; Finland
Silver	Yury Voronkin; Russia
Bronze	Wojciech Kondratowicz; Poland

== Results ==
=== Final ===
1 August

Rank	Name	Nationality	Attempts						Result	Notes
Rank	Name	Nationality	1	2	3	4	5	6	Result	Notes
1st place, gold medalist(s)	Olli-Pekka Karjalainen	Finland	x	72.40	72.31	x	x	71.85	72.40	
2nd place, silver medalist(s)	Yury Voronkin	Russia	66.97	67.98	67.51	x	69.66	x	69.66	
3rd place, bronze medalist(s)	Wojciech Kondratowicz	Poland	68.93	67.90	66.75	x	x	x	68.93	
4	Ioánnis Barlís	Greece	66.31	x	x	67.59	68.36	67.81	68.36	
5	Miloslav Konopka	Slovakia	64.69	x	66.36	66.58	67.09	x	67.09	
6	Nicolas Figère	France	x	63.50	65.98	62.15	x	65.21	65.98	
7	Péter Botfa	Hungary	64.15	64.26	65.08	62.84	x	63.36	65.08	
8	Marcin Szeszula	Poland	64.42	63.83	64.75	62.51	63.43	63.05	64.75	
9	Aleksey Mukhortov	Russia	61.59	63.07	63.39				63.39	
10	Lukáš Melich	Czech Republic	57.81	61.51	60.44				61.51	
11	Éric Albert	France	x	60.20	x				60.20	
12	Markus Esser	Germany	x	54.09	59.58				59.58	

=== Qualifications ===
31 Jul

==== Group A ====
Rank	Name	Nationality	Attempts			Result	Notes
Rank	Name	Nationality	1	2	3	Result	Notes
1	Olli-Pekka Karjalainen	Finland	69.39	-	-	69.39	Q
2	Miloslav Konopka	Slovakia	65.93	-	-	65.93	Q
3	Nicolas Figère	France	63.76	65.13	-	65.13	Q
4	Yury Voronkin	Russia	58.77	x	64.36	64.36	q
5	Lukáš Melich	Czech Republic	62.26	62.78	61.00	62.78	q
6	Marcin Szeszula	Poland	59.29	60.50	62.52	62.52	q
7	Dzmitry Shako	Belarus	62.08	61.25	61.14	62.08	
8	Dilshod Nazarov	Tajikistan	x	58.98	60.02	60.02	
9	Ross Corner	Australia	58.46	x	56.53	58.46	
10	Christian Fernández	Argentina	x	55.58	54.58	55.58	
11	Hrístos Tsintsos	Greece	54.50	53.16	51.77	54.50	

==== Group B ====
Rank	Name	Nationality	Attempts			Result	Notes
Rank	Name	Nationality	1	2	3	Result	Notes
1	Ioánnis Barlís	Greece	66.15	-	-	66.15	Q
2	Markus Esser	Germany	x	65.87	-	65.87	Q
3	Wojciech Kondratowicz	Poland	65.86	-	-	65.86	Q
4	Péter Botfa	Hungary	64.36	x	65.34	65.34	Q
5	Aleksey Mukhortov	Russia	63.87	62.53	64.07	64.07	q
6	Éric Albert	France	60.82	61.66	62.33	62.33	q
7	Fatih Eryildirim	Turkey	59.91	60.99	x	60.99	
8	John Badovinac	United States	58.27	57.27	x	58.27	
9	Hamad Saleh Al-Mahdi	Qatar	55.57	55.25	57.52	57.52	
10	Marco Felice	Italy	x	55.95	55.37	55.95	
11	Nabil Amroune	Algeria	54.49	x	x	54.49	
12	Dovletgeldy Mamedov	Turkmenistan	38.80	x	43.73	43.73	

== Participation ==
According to an unofficial count, 23 athletes from 19 countries participated in the event.

- Algeria (1)
- Argentina (1)
- Australia (1)
- Belarus (1)
- Czech Republic (1)
- Finland (1)
- France (2)
- Germany (1)
- Greece (2)
- Hungary (1)
- Italy (1)
- Poland (2)
- Qatar (1)
- Russia (2)
- Slovakia (1)
- Tajikistan (1)
- Turkey (1)
- Turkmenistan (1)
- United States (1)
