= Voronkin =

Voronkin (Russian: Воронкин), Voronkina is a surname. Notable people with the surname include:

- Artyom Voronkin (born 1986), Russian footballer
- Yuriy Voronkin (born 1979), Russian hammer thrower
- Elena Voronkina (born 1973), Ukrainian volleyball player
