= Fatih Eryıldırım =

Turkish hammer thrower (born 1979)

Fatih Eryıldırım (born 1 March 1979) is a Turkish retired hammer thrower. He was banned from competing for two years for doping.

== Biography ==
He finished ninth at the 2007 Universiade and sixth at the 2009 Mediterranean Games. He also competed at the 1998 World Junior Championships, the 2006 European Championships, the 2007 World Championships and the 2011 World Championships without reaching the final.

Eryıldırım became Turkish champion four times. In an out-of-competition test a week after the 2013 Turkish championships, he tested positive for doping and was suspended between June 2013 and December 2015.

Her personal best throw was 75.90 metres, achieved in June 2008 in İzmir.
