= Aliaksandr Vashchyla =

Belarusian hammer thrower

Aliaksandr Vashchyla (Belarusian: Аляксандар Вашчыла; born 30 August 1981) is a male hammer thrower from Belarus, who is best known for winning the gold medal at the 2007 Summer Universiade. He set his personal best (80.12 metres) in the hammer throw event on 7 June 2008 in Minsk.

== Achievements ==
Year	Competition	Venue	Position	Notes
Representing Belarus
2001	European U23 Championships	Amsterdam, Netherlands	10th	67.53 m
2003	European U23 Championships	Bydgoszcz, Poland	3rd	71.91 m
2007	Universiade	Bangkok, Thailand	1st	76.94 m
