= András Haklits =

Croatian hammer thrower

Personal information
- Born: 23 September 1977 (age 49) Szombathely, Hungary
- Education: University of Georgia
- Height: 1.89 m (6 ft 2 in)
- Weight: 103 kg (227 lb)

Sport
- Country: Hungary / Croatia
- Sport: Track and field
- Event: Hammer throw
- College team: Georgia Bulldogs; Louisiana–Monroe Warhawks
- Club: Mladost Zagreb

Achievements and titles
- Personal best: 80.41 m (2005)
Medal record
Representing Croatia
European U23 Championships
Silver medal – second place	1999 Gothenburg	Hammer throw

András Haklits (born 23 September 1977) is a Croatian hammer thrower and bobsledder. He represented Hungary until July 1998.

He finished tenth at the 2006 European Athletics Championships and eighth at the 2008 Olympic Games. In addition he competed at the World Championships in 1999, 2005 and 2007 and the Olympic Games in 2000 and 2004 without reaching the final.

His personal best is 80.41 metres, achieved in May 2005 in Marietta. He worked for Doyle Sports Management whilst living in Athens, Georgia, where he graduated in economics from the University of Georgia, and he now works for Babinyecz Management in Budapest.

Since 2009, Haklits has competed as a bobsledder. At the 2010 Winter Olympics in Vancouver, he finished 20th in the four-man event. His lone event outside the Winter Olympics was at Park City, Utah in November 2009 where he finished ninth in the four-man event.

His personal best in weight throw for distance is 24.43 m.

== Achievements ==
Year	Competition	Venue	Position	Notes
Representing Hungary
1996	World Junior Championships	Sydney, Australia	15th (q)	60.30 m
1997	European U23 Championships	Turku, Finland	13th (q)	65.32 m
Representing Croatia
1998	European Championships	Budapest, Hungary	22nd (q)	73.41 m
1999	Universiade	Palma de Mallorca, Spain	10th	73.23 m
1999	European U23 Championships	Gothenburg, Sweden	2nd	73.73 m
1999	World Championships	Seville, Spain	26th (q)	73.28 m
2000	Olympic Games	Sydney, Australia	29th (q)	72.66 m
2002	European Championships	Munich, Germany	—	NM
2004	Olympic Games	Athens, Greece	21st (q)	74.43 m
2005	Mediterranean Games	Almería, Spain	5th	73.08 m
2005	World Championships	Helsinki, Finland	16th (q)	73.26 m
2006	European Championships	Gothenburg, Sweden	10th	74.83 m
2007	World Championships	Osaka, Japan	18th (q)	73.04 m
2008	Olympic Games	Beijing, China	10th	76.58 m
2009	Mediterranean Games	Pescara, Italy	7th	71.31 m
2009	World Championships	Berlin, Germany	7th	76.26 m
2009	World Athletics Final	Thessaloniki, Greece	7th	75.35 m
2010	European Championships	Barcelona, Spain	21st (q)	70.84 m
2011	World Championships	Daegu, South Korea	25th (q)	70.93 m
2012	European Championships	Helsinki, Finland	27th (q)	69.31 m
2012	Olympic Games	London, United Kingdom	30th (q)	70.61 m
