= 2003 European Athletics U23 Championships – Men's hammer throw =

The men's hammer throw event at the 2003 European Athletics U23 Championships was held in Bydgoszcz, Poland, at Zawisza Stadion on 19 July.

== Medalists ==
Gold	Krisztián Pars; Hungary
Silver	Eşref Apak; Turkey
Bronze	Aliaksandr Vashchyla; Belarus

== Results ==
=== Final ===
19 July

Rank	Name	Nationality	Attempts						Result	Notes
Rank	Name	Nationality	1	2	3	4	5	6	Result	Notes
1st place, gold medalist(s)	Krisztián Pars	Hungary	x	72.13	77.25	64.66	74.88	75.39	77.25	
2nd place, silver medalist(s)	Eşref Apak	Turkey	73.23	76.52	x	75.06	75.21	x	76.52	
3rd place, bronze medalist(s)	Aliaksandr Vashchyla	Belarus	x	69.42	71.77	71.91	67.73	x	71.91	
4	Valeri Sviatokha	Belarus	62.63	x	67.95	70.28	69.14	x	70.28	
5	Petri Rautio	Finland	x	66.84	67.03	68.43	x	69.53	69.53	
6	Marcus Kahlmeyer	Germany	67.48	x	65.85	65.16	69.36	64.84	69.36	
7	Serhiy Karpovych	Ukraine	x	60.31	66.65	63.24	67.44	66.77	67.44	
8	Spiridon Zoullien	Greece	x	65.92	x	62.55	x	56.93	65.92	
9	Lasse Luotonen	Finland	65.80	64.56	64.47				65.80	
10	Jens Rautenkranz	Germany	60.31	65.37	64.32				65.37	
11	Alessandro Beschi	Italy	63.12	x	65.03				65.03	

== Participation ==
According to an unofficial count, 11 athletes from 8 countries participated in the event.

- Belarus (2)
- Finland (2)
- Germany (2)
- Greece (1)
- Hungary (1)
- Italy (1)
- Turkey (1)
- Ukraine (1)
