= Eşref Apak =

Turkish hammer thrower (born 1982)

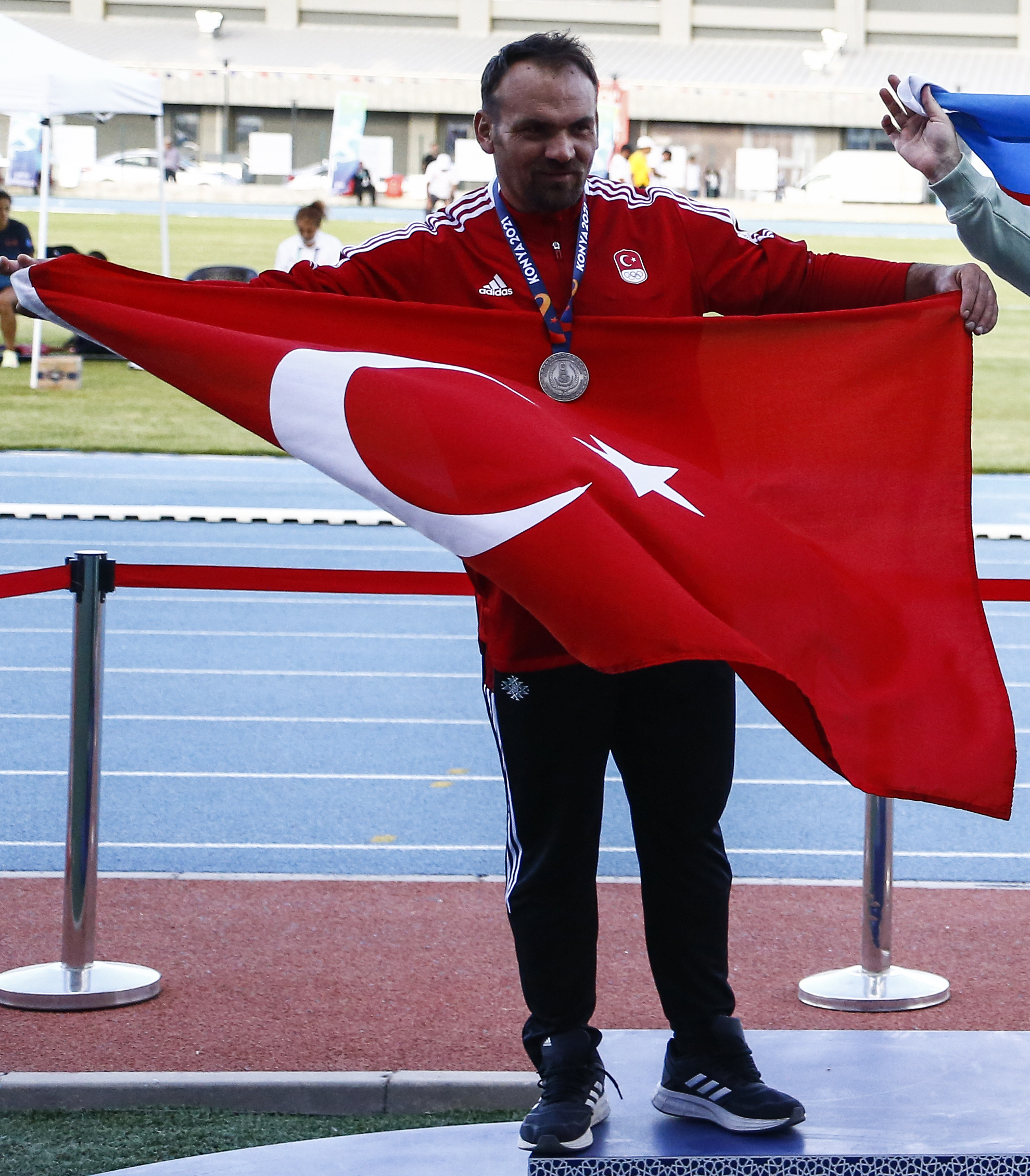
- Eşref Apak in 2022

Personal information
- Nationality: Turkish
- Born: 3 January 1982 (age 44) Kalecik, Ankara, Turkey
- Height: 185 cm (6 ft 1 in)
- Weight: 115 kg (254 lb)

Sport
- Country: Turkey
- Sport: Athletics
- Event: Hammer throw
- Club: Enkaspor
- Coached by: Artun Talay

Achievements and titles
- Personal best: 81.45 m (2005)
Medal record
Men's Athletics
Representing Turkey
Mediterranean Games
| Gold medal – first place | 2005 Almeria | Hammer throw |
Islamic Solidarity Games
| Gold medal – first place | 2017 Baku | Hammer throw |
| Silver medal – second place | 2021 Konya | Hammer throw |
European Team Championships
| Silver medal – second place | 2017 Lille | Hammer throw |
Universiade
| Silver medal – second place | 2005 İzmir | Hammer throw |
World Junior Championships
| Gold medal – first place | 2000 Santiago | Hammer throw |

Eşref Apak (born 3 January 1982 in Kalecik, Ankara) is a Turkish hammer thrower. Apak was a member of Fenerbahçe Athletics in Istanbul then transferred to Enkaspor, where he was coached by Artun Talay. The 185 cm (6 ft 1 in) tall athlete at 115 kg (254 lb) was a student of physical education and sports at Gazi University in Ankara.

Apak took part at the 2004 Summer Olympics in Athens and originally took a fource place with 79.51 m result. After a series of doping-related disqualifications he moved up to second place after the gold medalist Koji Murofushi of Japan. However, as he had been suspended from the sport for doping offenses since 2004, the IOC decided not to award the both silver and bronze medals. In 2005 Apak participated at the 2005 Mediterranean Games in Almería and won the gold medal.

Eşref Apak is married to sprinter Sema Aydemir, and the couple has a son Ali.

He served a 2-year doping ban for the use of a prohibited substance, Stanozolol. The ban lasted from 8 June 2013 to 25 June 2015.

== Achievements ==
| Year | Competition | Venue | Position | Notes |
Representing Turkey
| 2000 | World Junior Championships | Santiago, Chile | 1st | 69.97 m NJR |
| 2001 | Mediterranean Games | Tunis, Tunisia | 6th | 71.06 m |
| 2003 | European U23 Championships | Bydgoszcz, Poland | 2nd | 76.52 m |
| 2004 | Olympic Games | Athens, Greece | 2nd (without medal) | 79.51 m |
| 2005 | Universiade | İzmir, Turkey | 2nd | 76.18 m |
| 2005 | Mediterranean Games | Almería, Spain | 1st | 77.88 m |
| 2005 | World Championships | Helsinki, Finland | 17th (q) | 73.04 m |
| 2006 | European Championships | Gothenburg, Sweden | 19th (q) | 70.17 m |
| 2007 | World Championships | Osaka, Japan | 11th | 76.59 m |
| 2008 | Olympic Games | Beijing, China | 16th (q) | 74.45 m |
| 2009 | World Championships | Berlin, Germany | 27th (q) | 70.70 m |
| 2012 | Olympic Games | London, United Kingdom | 17th (q) | 73.47 m |
| 2015 | World Championships | Beijing, China | 17th (q) | 73.01 m |
| 2016 | European Championships | Amsterdam, Netherlands | – | NM |
| 2016 | Olympic Games | Rio de Janeiro, Brazil | 24th (q) | 70.08 m |
| 2017 | Islamic Solidarity Games | Baku, Azerbaijan | 1st | 74.32 m |
| 2017 | European Team Championships | Lille, France | 2nd | 71.53 m |
| 2017 | World Championships | London, United Kingdom | 16th (q) | 73.55 m |
| 2018 | European Championships | Berlin, Germany | 17th (q) | 72.70 m |
| 2021 | Olympic Games | Tokyo, Japan | 9th | 76.71 m |
| 2022 | Islamic Solidarity Games | Konya, Turkey | 2nd | 71.34 m |
