= Alexandros Papadimitriou =

Greek hammer thrower (born 1973)

Personal information
- Born: June 18, 1973 (age 53) Larissa, Greece
- Height: 1.83 m (6 ft 0 in)
- Weight: 120 kg (265 lb)

Sport
- Country: Greece
- Sport: Athletics
- Event: Hammer throw
Medal record
Men's athletics
Representing Greece
European Championships
Bronze medal – third place	2002 Munich	Hammer throw
Mediterranean Games
Silver medal – second place	2001 Tunis	Hammer throw
Silver medal – second place	2005 Almeria	Hammer throw
Bronze medal – third place	2009 Pescara	Hammer throw
- Updated on 14 August 2012

Alexandros Papadimitriou (Greek: Αλέξανδρος Παπαδημητρίου; born 18 June 1973) is a Greek hammer thrower. His personal best throw is 80.45 metres, achieved in July 2000 in Athens. This is the current Greek record.

Papadimitriou was born in Larissa and attended The University of Texas at El Paso in the U.S. He began his career in Iraklis, moving to AEK later on.

== Honours ==
Year	Competition	Venue	Position	Notes
Representing Greece
1991	European Junior Championships	Thessaloniki, Greece	7th	62.62 m
1992	World Junior Championships	Seoul, South Korea	6th	66.96 m
1996	Olympic Games	Atlanta, Georgia, United States	16th (q)	74.46 m
1997	Mediterranean Games	Bari, Italy	4th	75.70 m
1997	World Championships	Athens, Greece	19th (q)	73.92 m
1998	European Championships	Budapest, Hungary	27th (q)	72.47 m
1999	Universiade	Palma de Mallorca, Spain	7th	76.66 m
1999	World Championships	Seville, Spain	27th (q)	72.97 m
2000	Olympic Games	Sydney, Australia	12th	73.30 m
2001	World Championships	Edmonton, Canada	16th (q)	75.63 m
2001	Mediterranean Games	Radès, Tunisia	2nd	76.98 m
2002	European Championships	Munich, Germany	3rd	80.21 m
2003	World Championships	Paris, France	8th	77.79 m
2004	Olympic Games	Athens, Greece	17th (q)	75.55 m
2005	Mediterranean Games	Almería, Spain	2nd	75.57 m
2005	World Championships	Helsinki, Finland	11th (q)	74.99 m
2006	European Championships	Gothenburg, Sweden	17th (q)	72.94 m
2006	World Cup	Athens, Greece	5th	74.13 m
2007	World Championships	Osaka, Japan	22nd (q)	71.58 m
2008	Olympic Games	Beijing, PR China	18th (q)	74.33 m
2009	World Championships	Berlin, Germany	23rd (q)	72.02 m
2009	Mediterranean Games	Pescara, Italy	3rd	73.69 m
2012	Olympic Games	London, United Kingdom	37th (q)	67.19 m
