= Juan Ignacio Cerra =

Argentine hammer thrower

Personal information
- Born: 16 October 1976 (age 49) Santa Fe, Argentina
- Height: 1.80 m (5 ft 11 in)
- Weight: 100 kg (220 lb)

Sport
- Country: Argentina
- Sport: Athletics
- Event: Hammer throw
Medal record
Pan American Games
Gold medal – first place	2003 Santo Domingo	Hammer throw
Bronze medal – third place	1999 Winnipeg	Hammer throw
Bronze medal – third place	2007 Rio de Janeiro	Hammer throw
South American Games
Gold medal – first place	1998 Cuenca	Hammer throw
Bronze medal – third place	2014 Santiago	Hammer throw
South American Youth Championships
Gold medal – first place	1992 Santiago	Hammer throw
Silver medal – second place	1992 Santiago	Discus throw
- Updated on 5 May 2014

Juan Ignacio Cerra (born 16 October 1976 in Santa Fe) is a male hammer thrower from Argentina. His personal best throw is 76.42 metres, achieved in July 2001 in Trieste. This is also the South American record.

== Career ==
He won the gold medal at the 2003 Pan American Games. He also has a bronze medal from the 1999 Pan American Games, and won the 1998 South American Games. He participated at the World Championships in Athletics in 1999, 2001, 2003 and 2005 as well as the Summer Olympics in 2000, 2004, 2008 and 2012 without reaching the final. He won the Konex Award Merit Diploma in 2010 as one of the five best athletes from the last decade in Argentina.

== Personal bests ==
- Hammer throw: 76.42 m – (Italy) Trieste, 25 July 2001

== Competition record ==
Year	Competition	Venue	Position	Event	Notes
Representing Argentina
1992	South American Youth Championships	Santiago, Chile	2nd	Discus (1.5 kg)	49.74 m
1992	South American Youth Championships	Santiago, Chile	1st	Hammer (5 kg)	69.64 m
1993	Pan American Junior Championships	Winnipeg, Canada	3rd	Hammer	57.78 m
1993	South American Junior Championships	Puerto la Cruz, Venezuela	1st	Hammer	58.02 m
1994	South American Junior Championships	Santa Fe, Argentina	1st	Hammer	66.62 m
1994	World Junior Championships	Lisbon, Portugal	12th (q)	Hammer	60.44 m
1995	Pan American Junior Championships	Santiago, Chile	9th	Discus	40.92 m
1995	Pan American Junior Championships	Santiago, Chile	2nd	Hammer	64.24 m
1995	South American Junior Championships	Santiago, Chile	2nd	Discus	44.40 m
1995	South American Junior Championships	Santiago, Chile	1st	Hammer	67.12 m
1997	South American Championships	Mar del Plata, Argentina	3rd	Hammer	68.92 m
1998	Ibero-American Championships	Lisbon, Portugal	3rd	Hammer	70.83 m
1998	South American Games	Cuenca, Ecuador	1st	Hammer	68.56 m A
1999	South American Championships	Bogotá, Colombia	1st	Hammer	72.09 m
1999	Pan American Games	Winnipeg, Canada	3rd	Hammer	70.68 m
1999	World Championships	Seville, Spain	31st (q)	Hammer	71.24 m
2000	Ibero-American Championships	Rio de Janeiro, Brazil	1st	Hammer	74.32 m
2000	Olympic Games	Sydney, Australia	27th (q)	Hammer	72.86 m
2001	South American Championships	Manaus, Brazil	1st	Hammer	73.95 m
2001	World Championships	Edmonton, Canada	29th (q)	Hammer	70.70 m
2003	South American Championships	Barquisimeto, Venezuela	1st	Hammer	73.31 m
2003	Pan American Games	Santo Domingo, Dominican Republic	1st	Hammer	75.53 m
2003	World Championships	Paris, France	24th (q)	Hammer	72.70 m
2004	Ibero-American Championships	Huelva, Spain	1st	Hammer	73.34 m
2004	Olympic Games	Athens, Greece	26th (q)	Hammer	72.53 m
2005	South American Championships	Cali, Colombia	1st	Hammer	72.03 m
2005	World Championships	Helsinki, Finland	27th (q)	Hammer	68.44 m
2006	Ibero-American Championships	Ponce, Puerto Rico	1st	Hammer	69.38 m
2006	South American Championships	Tunja, Colombia	1st	Hammer	71.20 m
2007	South American Championships	São Paulo, Brazil	1st	Hammer	72.96 m
2007	Pan American Games	Rio de Janeiro, Brazil	3rd	Hammer	72.12 m
2008	Ibero-American Championships	Iquique, Chile	1st	Hammer	69.74 m
2008	Olympic Games	Beijing, China	30th (q)	Hammer	70.16 m
2009	South American Championships	Lima, Peru	1st	Hammer	69.42 m
2009	World Championships	Berlin, Germany	30th (q)	Hammer	69.37 m
2010	Ibero-American Championships	San Fernando, Spain	2nd	Hammer	71.37 m
2011	South American Championships	Buenos Aires, Argentina	1st	Hammer	72.12 m
2011	World Championships	Daegu, South Korea	34th (q)	Hammer	64.27 m
2011	Pan American Games	Guadalajara, Mexico	6th	Hammer	66.80 m
2012	Ibero-American Championships	Barquisimeto, Venezuela	3rd	Hammer	70.86 m
2012	Olympic Games	London, United Kingdom	36th (q)	Hammer	68.20 m
2013	South American Championships	Cartagena, Colombia	2nd	Hammer	69.33 m
2014	South American Games	Santiago, Chile	3rd	Hammer	66.34 m
2014	Ibero-American Championships	São Paulo, Brazil	5th	Hammer	67.96 m
2015	South American Championships	Lima, Peru	3rd	Hammer	67.70 m
