= Alfred Kruger =

American hammer thrower (born 1979)

Personal information
- Full name: Alfred George Kruger III
- Born: February 18, 1979 (age 46) Sheldon, Iowa, U.S.
- Height: 6 ft 4 in (193 cm)
- Weight: 276 lb (125 kg)

Sport
- Country: United States
- Sport: Athletics
- Event: Hammer throw

Alfred George Kruger III (born February 18, 1979) is a male hammer thrower from the United States.

== Career ==
His personal best is 79.26 metres, achieved in August 2004 in Berea.

He finished fourth at the 2006 IAAF World Cup. In addition, he competed at the 2004 Olympic Games, the 2005 World Championships, the 2007 World Championships, the 2008 Olympic Games, the 2009 World Championships, the 2012 Olympic Games and the 2013 World Championships without reaching the final.

He is from the same home town, Sheldon, Iowa, as Olympic gold medalist and University of Iowa wrestling coach Tom Brands. Kruger attended Morningside College in Sioux City, Iowa where he was a Division II student-athlete in both football and track and field. AG is the youngest child of Al and Linda Kruger. AG married his wife Laura in the fall of 2007. The two had their first child, a son, Alfred George Kruger IV in August 2011.

After dominating in life, he became the track coach at Ashland University in 2022, where he was able to return to the former workplace of his idol, Bill Goldring.

== Achievements ==
Year	Competition	Venue	Position	Notes
Representing the United States
2004	Olympic Games	Athens, Greece	32nd (q)	69.38 m
2005	World Championships	Helsinki, Finland	14th (q)	73.63 m
2006	World Cup	Athens, Greece	4th	75.53 m
2007	Pan American Games	Rio de Janeiro, Brazil	4th	68.71 m
2007	World Championships	Osaka, Japan	17th (q)	73.19 m
2008	Olympic Games	Beijing, PR China	27th (q)	71.21 m
2009	World Championships	Berlin, Germany	28th (q)	70.19 m
2012	Olympic Games	London, United Kingdom	25th (q)	72.13 m
2013	World Championships	Moscow, Russia	17th (q)	73.35 m
2015	World Championships	Beijing, China	24th (q)	71.56 m
