= David Söderberg =

Finnish hammer thrower

Personal information
- Born: August 11, 1979 (age 46) Vörå, Finland
- Height: 1.85 m (6 ft 1 in)
- Weight: 96 kg (212 lb)

Sport
- Country: Finland
- Sport: Athletics
- Event: Hammer throw
- Updated on 14 August 2012

David Söderberg (born 11 August 1979) is a Finnish hammer thrower. His personal best throw is 78.83 metres, achieved in July 2003 in Lahti.

He won the bronze medal at the 2003 Summer Universiade and finished fourth at the 2005 Summer Universiade. He also competed at the European Championships in 2002 and 2006 as well as the 2004 Olympic Games without reaching the final.

== Competition record ==
Year	Competition	Venue	Position	Notes
Representing Finland
2001	European U23 Championships	Amsterdam, Netherlands	10th (q)	70.62 m (Note: No mark in the final)
2002	European Championships	Munich, Germany	23rd (q)	74.64 m
2003	Universiade	Daegu, South Korea	3rd	72.84 m
2004	Olympic Games	Athens, Greece	22nd (q)	74.14 m
2005	Universiade	İzmir, Turkey	4th	73.55 m
2006	European Championships	Gothenburg, Sweden	18th (q)	72.49 m
2007	World Championships	Osaka, Japan	20th (q)	72.45 m
2009	World Championships	Berlin, Germany	18th (q)	73.69 m
2010	European Championships	Barcelona, Spain	13th (q)	73.87 m
2012	European Championships	Helsinki, Finland	-	NM
2012	Olympic Games	London, United Kingdom	26th (q)	71.76 m
2014	European Championships	Zurich, Switzerland	8th	76.55 m
2015	World Championships	Beijing, China	6th	76.92 m
2016	European Championships	Amsterdam, Netherlands	7th	74.22 m
2016	Olympic Games	Rio de Janeiro, Brazil	8th	74.61 m
2017	World Championships	London, United Kingdom	15th (q)	73.76 m
2018	European Championships	Berlin, Germany	28th (q)	69.18 m
