= Nikolay Davydov =

Kyrgyzstani hammer thrower

Medal record

Men's athletics

Representing Kyrgyzstan

Asian Championships
Bronze medal – third place	1998 Fukuoka	Hammer throw

Nikolay Valeryevich Davydov (Russian: Николай Васильевич Давыдов; born 11 April 1970) is a retired male hammer thrower from Kyrgyzstan. His personal best throw was 77.90 metres, achieved in July 1995 in Moscow.

== Achievements ==
Year	Competition	Venue	Position	Notes
Representing Kyrgyzstan
1998	Asian Championships	Fukuoka, Japan	3rd	70.31 m
1998	Asian Games	Bangkok, Thailand	3rd	68.10 m
1999	World Championships	Seville, Spain	37th	66.87 m
2000	Olympic Games	Sydney, Australia	—	NM
