= Athletics at the 2008 Summer Olympics – Men's hammer throw =

Men's hammer throw at the Games of the XXIX Olympiad
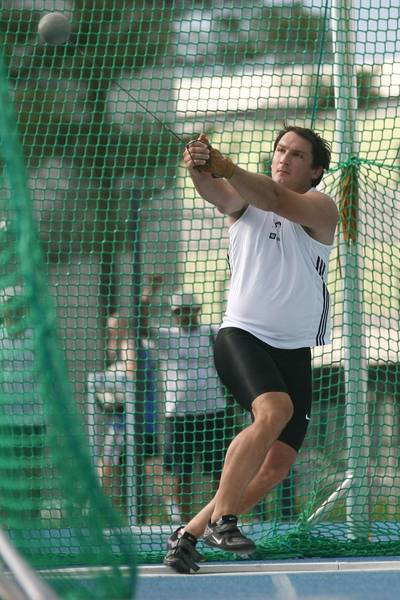
- Primož Kozmus (2011)
- Venue: Beijing National Stadium
- Dates: 15 August 2008 (qualifying); 17 August 2008 (final)
- Competitors: 33 from 26 nations
- Winning distance: 82.02

Medalists
| 1st place, gold medalist(s) | | Primož Kozmus; Slovenia |
| 2nd place, silver medalist(s) | | Vadim Devyatovskiy; Belarus |
| 3rd place, bronze medalist(s) | | Ivan Tsikhan; Belarus |

The men's hammer throw at the 2008 Summer Olympics took place on 15 August (qualifying) and 17 (final) at the Beijing National Stadium. There were 33 competitors from 26 nations. The event was won by Primož Kozmus of Slovenia, the nation's first medal in the event.

The original silver and bronze medalists, Vadim Devyatovskiy and Ivan Tsikhan of Belarus, were disqualified in December 2008 for testing positive for abnormal levels of testosterone. The medals were awarded to Krisztián Pars of Hungary and Koji Murofushi of Japan respectively. Tsikhan announced that he and Devyatovskiy intended to appeal the IOC's decision. In June 2010 the Court of Arbitration for Sport ruled that the disqualified Belarusians should get their original medals back due to errors at the Chinese medical lab.

== Background ==
This was the 25th appearance of the event, which has been held at every Summer Olympics except 1896. Nine of the 12 finalists from the 2004 Games returned: gold medalist (and 2000 finalist) Koji Murofushi of Japan, bronze medalist Eşref Apak of Turkey, fourth-place finisher Vadim Devyatovskiy of Belarus, fifth-place finisher Krisztián Pars of Hungary, sixth-place finisher Primož Kozmus of Slovenia, seventh-place finisher Libor Charfreitag of Slovakia, tenth-place finisher Nicola Vizzoni of Italy, eleventh-place finisher Markus Esser of Germany, and Ivan Tsikhan of Belarus, who at the time was the 2004 silver medalist but who would later be stripped of that medal. Tsikhan was also the three-time reigning (2003, 2005, 2007) World Champion (though the 2005 result would be stripped), with Kozmus the runner-up and Charfreitag third. Szymon Ziółkowski of Poland, the 2000 Olympic and 2001 World champion (and 2005 World Champion after Tsikhan's win was vacated), returned after not making the final in 2004.

Egypt, Iceland, Latvia, and Turkmenistan each made their debut in the event. The United States appeared for the 24th time, most of any nation, having missed only the boycotted 1980 Games.

== Qualification ==
The qualifying standards for the 2008 event were 78.50 m (257 ft 7 in) (A standard) and 74.00 m (242 ft 9 in) (B standard). Each National Olympic Committee (NOC) was able to enter up to three entrants providing they had met the A qualifying standard in the qualifying period (1 January 2007 to 23 July 2008). NOCs were also permitted to enter one athlete providing he had met the B standard in the same qualifying period. The maximum number of athletes per nation had been set at 3 since the 1930 Olympic Congress.

== Competition format ==
The competition used the two-round format introduced in 1936, with the qualifying round completely separate from the divided final. In qualifying, each athlete received three attempts; those recording a mark of at least 78.00 metres advanced to the final. If fewer than 12 athletes achieved that distance, the top 12 would advance. The results of the qualifying round were then ignored. Finalists received three throws each, with the top eight competitors receiving an additional three attempts. The best distance among those six throws counted.

== Records ==
Prior to this competition, the existing world and Olympic records were as follows:

| World record | Yuriy Sedykh (URS) | 86.74 | Stuttgart, Germany | 30 August 1986 |
| Olympic record | Sergey Litvinov (URS) | 84.80 | Seoul, South Korea | 26 September 1988 |

No new world or Olympic records were set for this event.

== Schedule ==
All times are China standard time (UTC+8)

| Date | Time | Round |
|---|---|---|
| Friday, 15 August 2008 | 10:40 | Qualifying |
| Sunday, 17 August 2008 | 19:10 | Final |

== Results ==
=== Qualifying ===
Qualification: 78.00 (Q) or at least 12 best performers (q) advance to the final.

| Rank | Group | Athlete | Nation | 1 | 2 | 3 | Distance | Notes |
|---|---|---|---|---|---|---|---|---|
| 1 | A | Krisztián Pars | Hungary | X | 80.07 | – | 80.07 | Q |
| 2 | B | Szymon Ziółkowski | Poland | 79.55 | – | – | 79.55 | Q, SB |
| 3 | B | Primož Kozmus | Slovenia | 79.44 | – | – | 79.44 | Q |
| 4 | B | Ivan Tsikhan | Belarus | 79.26 | – | – | 79.26 | Q |
| 5 | A | Koji Murofushi | Japan | 78.16 | – | – | 78.16 | Q |
| 6 | A | Markus Esser | Germany | X | 77.00 | 77.60 | 77.60 | q |
| 7 | A | Andras Haklits | Croatia | 74.27 | 77.12 | 76.23 | 77.12 | q |
| 8 | B | Olli-Pekka Karjalainen | Finland | 75.49 | X | 77.07 | 77.07 | q |
| 9 | B | Vadim Devyatovskiy | Belarus | 73.39 | 76.56 | 76.95 | 76.95 | q |
| 10 | B | Libor Charfreitag | Slovakia | 76.03 | X | 76.61 | 76.61 | q |
| 11 | B | James Steacy | Canada | 76.32 | X | 75.01 | 76.32 | q |
| 12 | A | Dilshod Nazarov | Tajikistan | 74.67 | 75.34 | 72.47 | 75.34 | q |
| 13 | B | Nicola Vizzoni | Italy | 72.82 | X | 75.01 | 75.01 | |
| 14 | A | Yevhen Vynohradov | Ukraine | 73.41 | 74.49 | X | 74.49 | |
| 15 | B | Artem Rubanko | Ukraine | 74.47 | 73.89 | X | 74.47 | |
| 16 | B | Eşref Apak | Turkey | X | 74.45 | X | 74.45 | |
| 17 | A | Valeriy Sviatokha | Belarus | 74.41 | X | X | 74.41 | |
| 18 | A | Alexandros Papadimitriou | Greece | X | 74.33 | 73.83 | 74.33 | |
| 19 | A | Igors Sokolovs | Latvia | 73.72 | 71.50 | X | 73.72 | |
| 20 | B | Ali Al-Zinkawi | Kuwait | X | 73.62 | X | 73.62 | |
| 21 | A | Kirill Ikonnikov | Russia | X | 72.04 | 72.33 | 72.33 | |
| 22 | B | Igor Vinichenko | Russia | X | 72.05 | X | 72.05 | |
| 23 | A | Miloslav Konopka | Slovakia | 71.76 | 71.96 | X | 71.96 | |
| 24 | A | Ihor Tuhay | Ukraine | 71.89 | X | 70.56 | 71.89 | |
| 25 | A | Bergur Ingi Pétursson | Iceland | 69.73 | X | 71.63 | 71.63 | |
| 26 | B | Roman Rozna | Moldova | 71.33 | 69.99 | 70.23 | 71.33 | |
| 27 | B | A.G. Kruger | United States | 70.58 | 71.21 | X | 71.21 | |
| 28 | B | Dorian Çollaku | Albania | 69.14 | 69.84 | 70.98 | 70.98 | |
| 29 | A | Lukas Melich | Czech Republic | 69.31 | 70.56 | 69.03 | 70.56 | |
| 30 | B | Juan Ignacio Cerra | Argentina | X | 70.16 | X | 70.16 | |
| – | A | Mohsen El Anany | Egypt | X | X | X | NM | |
| – | B | Amanmurad Hommadov | Turkmenistan | X | X | X | NM | |
| – | A | Marco Lingua | Italy | X | X | X | NM | |

=== Final ===
The final was held on 17 August. The eight highest-ranked competitors after three rounds qualified for the final three throws to decide the medals.

| Rank | Athlete | Nation | 1 | 2 | 3 | 4 | 5 | 6 | Distance | Notes |
|---|---|---|---|---|---|---|---|---|---|---|
| 1st place, gold medalist(s) | Primož Kozmus | Slovenia | 80.75 | 82.02 | 80.79 | 80.64 | 80.98 | 80.85 | 82.02 | SB |
| 2nd place, silver medalist(s) | Vadim Devyatovskiy | Belarus | 79.00 | 81.61 | X | X | 80.86 | X | 81.61 | |
| 3rd place, bronze medalist(s) | Ivan Tsikhan | Belarus | 78.49 | 80.56 | 79.59 | 78.89 | 81.51 | 80.87 | 81.51 | |
| 4 | Krisztián Pars | Hungary | 78.05 | 80.96 | X | 80.16 | 80.11 | 79.83 | 80.96 | |
| 5 | Koji Murofushi | Japan | 79.47 | 80.71 | 79.94 | 77.96 | 78.22 | 77.26 | 80.71 | |
| 6 | Olli-Pekka Karjalainen | Finland | 77.92 | 79.59 | 78.99 | X | 78.88 | X | 79.59 | SB |
| 7 | Szymon Ziółkowski | Poland | 75.92 | 79.22 | 79.07 | 79.04 | 76.16 | X | 79.22 | |
| 8 | Libor Charfreitag | Slovakia | X | 77.62 | 76.83 | 77.26 | 78.65 | X | 78.65 | |
| 9 | Markus Esser | Germany | 74.56 | X | 77.10 | Did not advance | | | 77.10 | |
| 10 | András Haklits | Croatia | X | 75.78 | 76.58 | Did not advance | | | 76.58 | |
| 11 | Dilshod Nazarov | Tajikistan | 72.97 | 76.54 | X | Did not advance | | | 76.54 | |
| 12 | James Steacy | Canada | 75.72 | 75.54 | 74.06 | Did not advance | | | 75.72 | |

== See also ==
- 2008 Hammer Throw Year Ranking
