= Lukáš Melich =

Czech hammer thrower (born 1980)

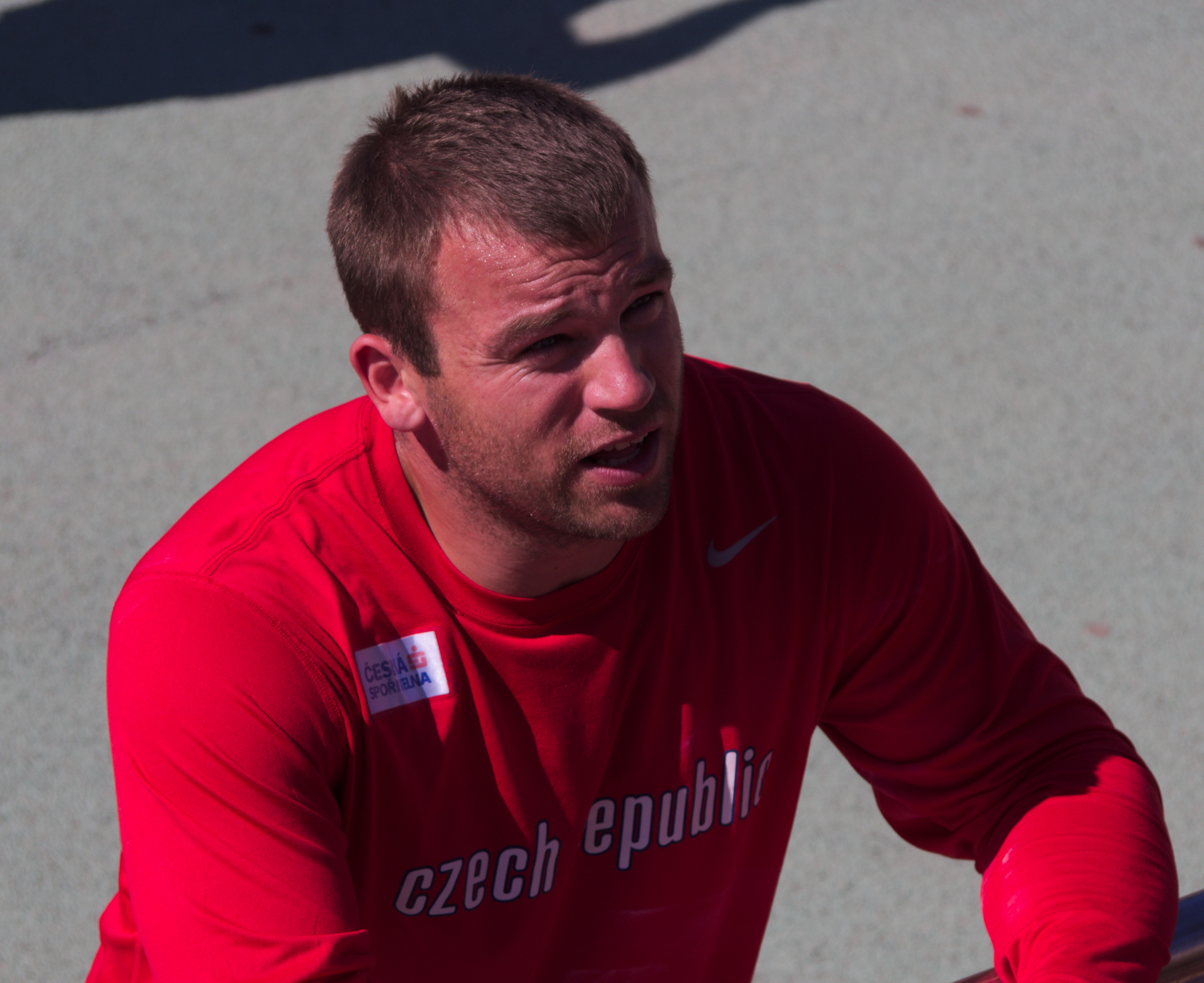
- Melich at the 2015 European Team Championship

Personal information
- Born: 16 September 1980 (age 45) Jilemnice, Czechoslovakia
- Height: 1.86 m (6 ft 1 in)
- Weight: 110 kg (243 lb)

Sport
- Country: Czech Republic
- Sport: Athletics
- Event: Hammer throw
Medal record
World Championships
| Bronze medal – third place | 2013 Moscow | Hammer throw |
- Updated on 12 August 2013

Lukáš Melich (Czech pronunciation: [ˈlukaːʃ ˈmɛlɪx]; born 16 September 1980) is a Czech hammer thrower. His personal best throw is 80.28 metres, achieved in 2013 in Szczecin.

== Achievements ==
| Year | Competition | Venue | Position | Notes |
Representing the Czech Republic
| 1998 | World Junior Championships | Annecy, France | 10th | 61.51 m |
| 1999 | European Junior Championships | Riga, Latvia | 5th | 64.20 m |
| 2001 | European U23 Championships | Amsterdam, Netherlands | 11th | 66.41 m |
| 2003 | Universiade | Daegu, South Korea | 4th | 71.26 m |
| 2005 | World Championships | Helsinki, Finland | 12th (q) | 74.53 m |
| 2006 | European Championships | Gothenburg, Sweden | 15th (q) | 73.77 m |
| 2008 | Olympic Games | Beijing, China | 29th (q) | 70.56 m |
| 2009 | World Championships | Berlin, Germany | 14th (q) | 74.47 m |
| 2012 | European Championships | Helsinki, Finland | 28th (q) | 68.92 m |
| 2012 | Olympic Games | London, United Kingdom | 6th | 77.17 m |
| 2013 | World Championships | Moscow, Russia | 3rd | 79.36 m |
| 2014 | European Championships | Zurich, Switzerland | 13th (q) | 73.48 m |
| 2015 | World Championships | Beijing, China | 20th (q) | 72.12 m |
| 2016 | European Championships | Amsterdam, Netherlands | 19th (q) | 70.50 m |
| 2016 | Olympic Games | Rio de Janeiro, Brazil | 15th (q) | 73.14 m |
