= Stuart Rendell =

Australian hammer thrower

Stuart Rendell (born 30 June 1972 in Canberra to Carole and Ralph Rendell) is an Australian retired hammer thrower. He competed in the 2000 and 2004 Olympics, but failed to qualify from his pool. His personal best throw is 79.29 metres, achieved in July 2002 in Varaždin. This is the current Oceanian record. He retired from athletics in 2006 after winning his second Commonwealth Games gold medal at the Melbourne Commonwealth Games, Australia, with a Games Record distance of 77.53m. Rendell taught at Miles Franklin Primary School from 2005 to 2008, before moving to the Garran Primary School at the start of 2009, but then moved to Calwell Primary School.

== Achievements ==
Year	Competition	Venue	Position	Notes
Representing Australia
1997	World Championships	Athens, Greece	17th (q)	74.28 m
1998	Commonwealth Games	Kuala Lumpur, Malaysia	1st	74.71 m
1999	World Championships	Seville, Spain	36th (q)	67.55 m
2000	Olympic Games	Sydney, Australia	28th (q)	72.78 m
2001	World Championships	Edmonton, Canada	19th (q)	75.00 m
2002	Commonwealth Games	Manchester, United Kingdom	4th	67.51 m
2003	World Championships	Paris, France	10th	75.72 m
2004	Olympic Games	Athens, Greece	25th (q)	72.61 m
2006	Commonwealth Games	Melbourne, Australia	1st	77.53 m
2006	World Cup	Athens, Greece	8th	71.99 m
