= Péter Botfa =

Hungarian hammer thrower

Péter Botfa (born 30 June 1979) is a retired male hammer thrower from Hungary. He set his personal best (80.67 metres) on 14 June 2003 in Zalaegerszeg.

== Achievements ==
Year	Competition	Venue	Position	Notes
Representing Hungary
1997	European Junior Championships	Ljubljana, Slovenia	9th	62.66 m
1998	World Junior Championships	Annecy, France	7th	65.08 m
1999	European U23 Championships	Gothenburg, Sweden	18th	65.60 m
2001	European U23 Championships	Amsterdam, Netherlands	9th	70.94 m
2003	World Student Games	Daegu, South Korea	2nd	74.41 m
2003	World Championships	Paris, France	19th	74.75 m
