= 2007 World Championships in Athletics – Men's hammer throw =

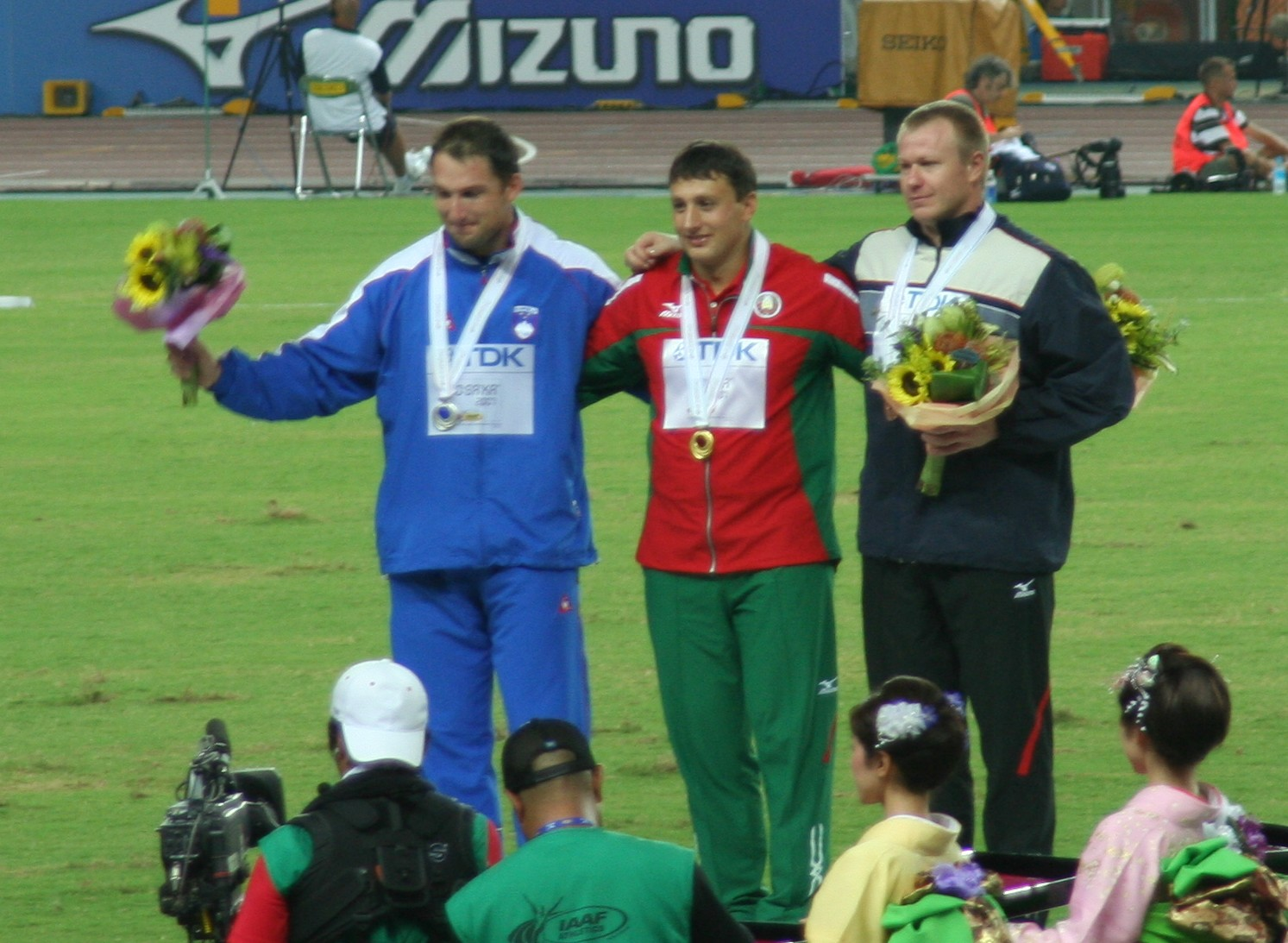
Victory ceremony

The men's hammer throw event at the 2007 World Championships in Athletics took place on 25 August 2007 (qualification) and 27 August 2007 (final) at the Nagai Stadium in Osaka, Japan.

== Medallists ==
Gold	Ivan Tsikhan; Belarus (BLR)
Silver	Primož Kozmus; Slovenia (SLO)
Bronze	Libor Charfreitag; Slovakia (SVK)

== Schedule ==
- All times are Japan Standard Time (UTC+9)

Qualification Round
Group A	Group B
25.08.2007 – 19:30h	25.08.2007 – 21:00h
Final Round
27.08.2007 – 19:30h

== Abbreviations ==
- All results shown are in metres

Q	automatic qualification
q	qualification by rank
DNS	did not start
NM	no mark
WR	world record
AR	area record
NR	national record
PB	personal best
SB	season best

== Records ==
Standing records prior to the 2007 World Athletics Championships
World Record	Yuriy Sedykh (URS)	86.74 m	August 30, 1986	Stuttgart, West Germany
Event Record	Ivan Tsikhan (BLR)	83.89 m	August 8, 2005	Helsinki, Finland
Season Best	Vadim Devyatovskiy (BLR)	82.94 m	July 28, 2007	Minsk, Belarus

== Qualification ==
=== Group A ===
Rank	Overall	Athlete	Nation	Attempts			Distance	Note
Rank	Overall	Athlete	Nation	1	2	3	Distance	Note
1	1	Libor Charfreitag	Slovakia	80.61	—	—	80.61 m	Q
2	3	Vadim Devyatovskiy	Belarus	76.85	79.30	—	79.30 m	Q
3	4	Krisztián Pars	Hungary	79.11	—	—	79.11 m	Q
4	8	Koji Murofushi	Japan	73.11	77.25	—	77.25 m	q
5	12	Eşref Apak	Turkey	75.27	73.34	74.04	75.27 m	q
6	13	James Steacy	Canada	74.11	X	73.07	74.11 m	
7	15	Yevhen Vynohradov	Ukraine	71.15	73.87	X	73.87 m	
8	16	Nicola Vizzoni	Italy	71.58	73.64	71.79	73.64 m	
9	18	András Haklits	Croatia	71.75	X	73.04	73.04 m	
10	19	Mohsen El Anany	Egypt	72.93	X	69.67	72.93 m	
11	20	David Söderberg	Finland	X	71.25	72.45	72.45 m	
12	21	Dilshod Nazarov	Tajikistan	71.70	70.71	X	71.70 m	
13	27	Dorian Collaku	Albania	66.63	68.30	63.86	68.30 m	SB
—	—	Kibwe Johnson	United States	X	X	X	NM	

=== Group B ===
Rank	Overall	Athlete	Nation	Attempts			Distance	Note
Rank	Overall	Athlete	Nation	1	2	3	Distance	Note
1	2	Miloslav Konopka	Slovakia	X	79.83	—	79.83 m	Q / SB
2	5	Szymon Ziółkowski	Poland	73.87	78.90	—	78.90 m	Q
3	6	Primož Kozmus	Slovenia	77.93	—	—	77.93 m	Q
4	7	Ivan Tsikhan	Belarus	X	77.75	—	77.75 m	Q
5	9	Ali Al-Zinkawi	Kuwait	X	76.49	X	76.49 m	q
6	10	Markus Esser	Germany	76.36	74.12	X	76.36 m	q
7	11	Olli-Pekka Karjalainen	Finland	75.04	X	76.12	76.12 m	q
8	14	Igors Sokolovs	Latvia	X	72.95	73.92	73.92 m	
9	17	A.G. Kruger	United States	73.19	69.39	X	73.19 m	
10	22	Alexandros Papadimitriou	Greece	71.58	X	X	71.58 m	
11	23	Cosmin Sorescu	Romania	70.43	71.49	69.42	71.49 m	
12	24	Chris Harmse	South Africa	71.07	X	X	71.07 m	
13	25	Aleksey Zagornyi	Russia	X	X	70.94	70.94 m	
14	26	Hiroaki Doi	Japan	67.57	69.89	X	69.89 m	
15	28	Fatih Eryildirim	Turkey	67.87	67.62	66.09	67.87 m	

== Final ==
Rank	Athlete	Nation	Attempts						Distance	Note
Rank	Athlete	Nation	1	2	3	4	5	6	Distance	Note
1st place, gold medalist(s)	Ivan Tsikhan	Belarus	X	X	79.35	X	80.77	83.63	83.63 m	SB
2nd place, silver medalist(s)	Primož Kozmus	Slovenia	80.68	79.62	82.12	X	X	82.29	82.29 m	
3rd place, bronze medalist(s)	Libor Charfreitag	Slovakia	X	80.93	79.10	76.88	81.60	80.48	81.60 m	SB
4	Vadim Devyatovskiy	Belarus	76.28	80.95	X	81.22	81.57	81.20	81.57 m	
5	Krisztián Pars	Hungary	78.29	79.49	79.55	79.63	77.29	80.93	80.93 m	
6	Koji Murofushi	Japan	76.94	79.46	80.38	79.56	80.13	80.46	80.46 m	SB
7	Szymon Ziółkowski	Poland	79.81	80.09	78.58	79.87	X	77.53	80.09 m	
8	Markus Esser	Germany	78.67	79.66	78.37	X	79.19	79.46	79.66 m	
9	Olli-Pekka Karjalainen	Finland	78.15	78.27	78.35				78.35 m	SB
10	Miloslav Konopka	Slovakia	X	78.09	X				78.09 m	
11	Eşref Apak	Turkey	75.67	X	76.59				76.59 m	
12	Ali Al-Zinkawi	Kuwait	X	72.88	76.04				76.04 m	

== See also ==
- 2007 in hammer throw
