= Primož Kozmus =

Slovenian hammer thrower

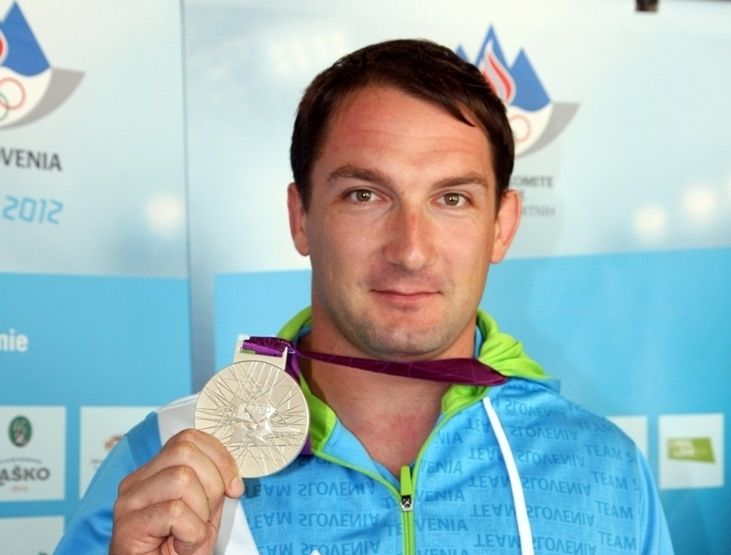
- Primož Kozmus in 2012.

Personal information
- Full name: Primož Kozmus
- Nationality: Slovenia
- Born: 30 September 1979 (age 47) Novo Mesto, SR Slovenia, SFR Yugoslavia
- Height: 1.88 m (6 ft 2 in)
- Weight: 106 kg (234 lb; 16.7 st)

Sport
- Country: Slovenia
- Sport: athletics
- Event: Hammer throw
Medal record
Men's athletics
Representing Slovenia
Olympic Games
Gold medal – first place	2008 Beijing	Hammer throw
Silver medal – second place	2012 London	Hammer throw
World Championships
Gold medal – first place	2009 Berlin	Hammer throw
Silver medal – second place	2007 Osaka	Hammer throw
Bronze medal – third place	2011 Daegu	Hammer throw
Military World Games
Gold medal – first place	2007 Hyderabad	Hammer throw

Primož Kozmus (born 30 September 1979) is a Slovenian hammer thrower. His gold medals in the 2008 Summer Olympics in Beijing and the 2009 World Championships in Berlin made him the first ever Slovenian athlete to win both titles.

His personal best throw and the Slovenian record is 82.58 metres, achieved in September 2009 in Celje, Slovenia.

On 8 October 2009, Kozmus unexpectedly announced his temporary retirement from athletics. On 25 October 2010, he announced his return. After moderate achievements in the 2011 season, Kozmus stated his goal at the 2011 World Championships in Athletics was to place in the top eight in the finals. He won bronze with 79.39 m. Since then, he has also won the silver medal at the 2012 Summer Olympics.

== Achievements ==
Year	Competition	Venue	Position	Notes
Representing Slovenia
1997	European Junior Championships	Ljubljana, Slovenia	22nd (q)	58.14 m
1999	European U23 Championships	Gothenburg, Sweden	12th	66.11 m
2000	Olympic Games	Sydney, Australia	38th (q)	68.83 m
2001	European U23 Championships	Amsterdam, Netherlands	15th (q)	68.11 m
2001	Mediterranean Games	Tunis, Tunisia	4th	71.12 m
2002	European Championships	Munich, Germany	25th (q)	72.60 m
2003	World Championship	Paris, France	5th	79.68 m
2003	World Athletics Final	Szombathely, Hungary	6th	78.59 m
2004	Olympic Games	Athens, Greece	5th	78.56 m
2004	World Athletics Final	Szombathely, Hungary	4th	77.21 m
2006	European Championships	Gothenburg, Sweden	7th	78.18 m
2006	World Athletics Final	Stuttgart, Germany	8th	76.39 m
2007	World Championships	Osaka, Japan	2nd	82.29 m
2007	World Athletics Final	Stuttgart, Germany	6th	76.78 m
2008	Olympic Games	Beijing, China	1st	82.02 m
2009	World Championships	Berlin, Germany	1st	80.84 m
2009	World Athletics Final	Thessaloniki, Greece	1st	79.80 m
2011	World Championships	Daegu, South Korea	3rd	79.39 m
2012	Olympic Games	London, United Kingdom	2nd	79.36 m
2013	World Championships	Moscow, Russia	4th	79.22 m
2014	European Championships	Zürich, Switzerland	6th	77.46 m
