= Libor Charfreitag =

Slovak hammer thrower

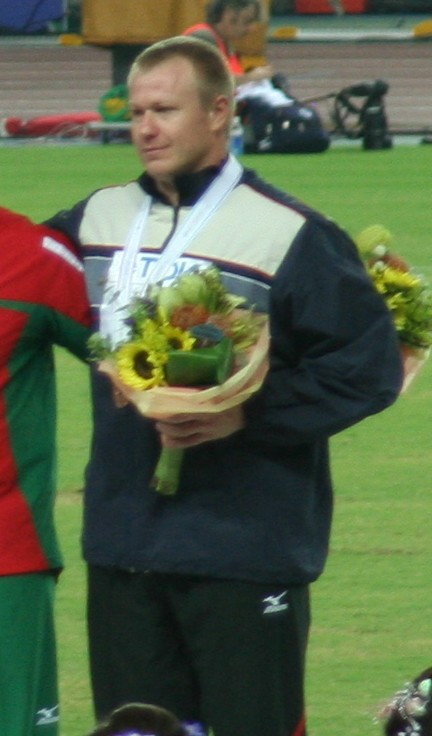
- Charfreitag at the 2007 World Championships

Personal information
- Nationality: Slovak
- Born: 11 September 1977 (age 49) Trnava, Czechoslovakia
- Height: 1.91 m (6 ft 3 in)
- Weight: 117 kg (258 lb)

Sport
- Country: Slovakia
- Sport: Athletics
- Event: Hammer throw
- Club: Slavia Trnava

Achievements and titles
- Personal best: 81.81 m (2003)
Medal record
Men's athletics
Representing Slovakia
World Championships
Bronze medal – third place	2007 Osaka	Hammer throw
European Championships
Gold medal – first place	2010 Barcelona	Hammer throw
Continental Cup
Gold medal – first place	2010 Split	Hammer throw

Libor Charfreitag (born 11 September 1977 in Trnava) is a former hammer thrower from Slovakia. His personal best throw is 81.81 metres, achieved in June 2003 in Prague.

== Career ==
He was chosen Slovak athlete of the year in 2003. He attended Southern Methodist University in Dallas, Texas.

He had a highly successful season in 2010: he won the gold medal at the 2010 European Athletics Championships, beat all-comers at the 2010 IAAF Continental Cup and finished third in the inaugural IAAF Hammer Throw Challenge series, finishing behind Asian throwers Koji Murofushi and Dilshod Nazarov.

== Achievements ==
Year	Competition	Venue	Position	Notes
Representing Slovakia
1996	World Junior Championships	Sydney, Australia	13th (q)	61.52 m
1999	Universiade	Palma de Mallorca, Spain	8th	75.18 m
1999	European U23 Championships	Gothenburg, Sweden	5th	72.82 m
1999	World Championships	Seville, Spain	32nd (q)	70.20 m
2000	Olympic Games	Sydney, Australia	30th (q)	72.52 m
2001	World Championships	Edmonton, Canada	18th (q)	75.29 m
2001	Universiade	Beijing, China	10th	69.49 m
2002	European Championships	Munich, Germany	7th	79.20 m
2003	World Championships	Paris, France	13th	76.52 m
2003	World Athletics Final	Szombathely, Hungary	2nd	81.22 m
2004	Olympic Games	Athens, Greece	6th	77.54 m
2004	World Athletics Final	Szombathely, Hungary	5th	76.99 m
2005	World Championships	Helsinki, Finland	8th	76.05 m
2005	World Athletics Final	Szombathely, Hungary	6th	76.59 m
2006	European Championships	Gothenburg, Sweden	14th (q)	74.13 m
2007	World Championships	Osaka, Japan	3rd	81.60 m
2007	World Athletics Final	Stuttgart, Germany	7th	75.89 m
2008	Olympic Games	Beijing, China	8th	78.65 m
2009	World Championships	Berlin, Germany	10th	72.63 m
2010	European Championships	Barcelona, Spain	1st	80.02 m
2011	World Championships	Daegu, South Korea	22nd (q)	72.20 m
2012	European Championships	Helsinki, Finland	26th (q)	69.65 m
2016	European Championships	Amsterdam, Netherlands	–	NM
