= Markus Esser =

German hammer thrower

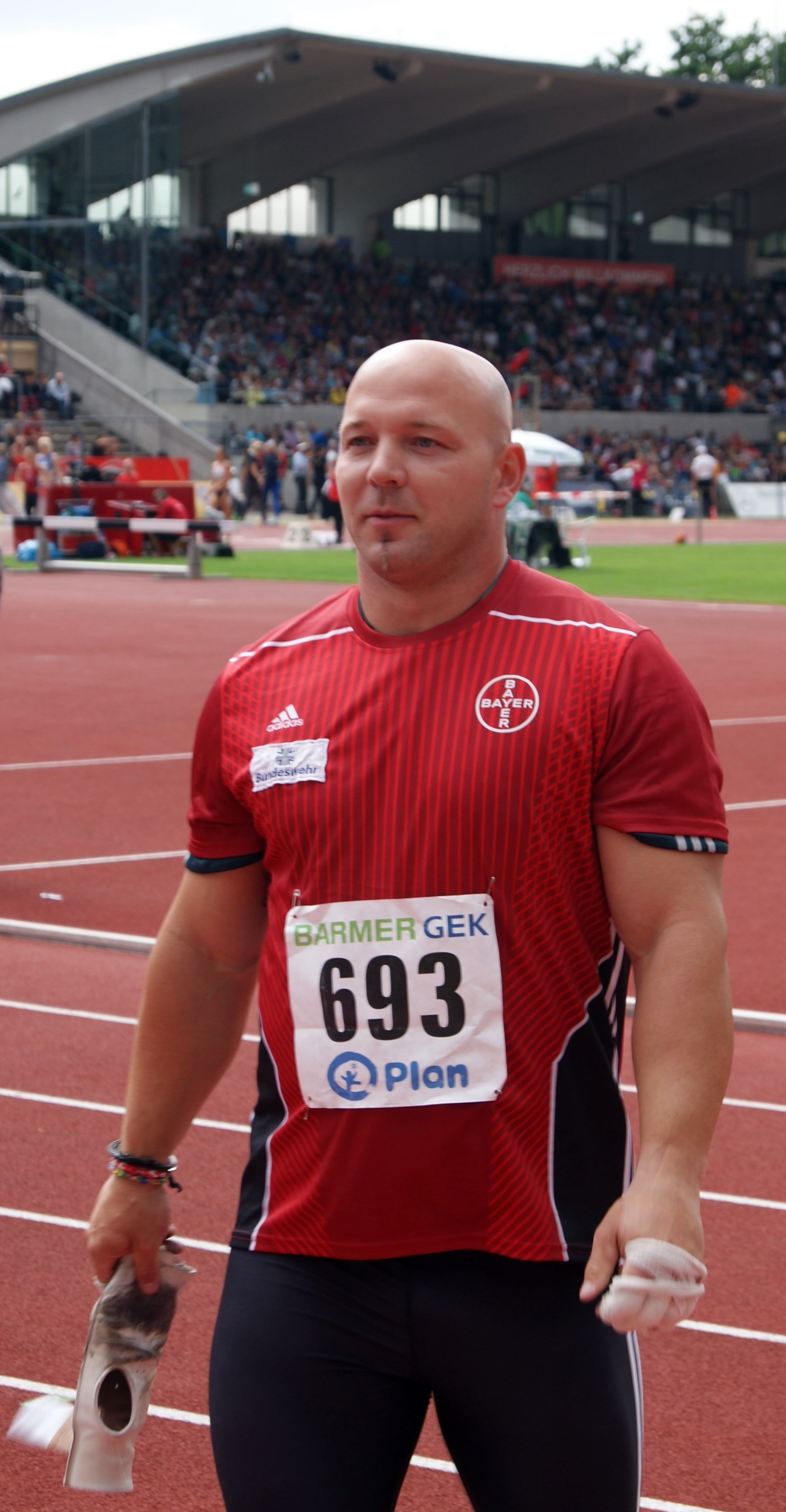
- Markus Esser in 2014

Personal information
- Nationality: Germany
- Born: February 3, 1980 (age 46) Leverkusen, West Germany
- Height: 1.80 m (5 ft 11 in)
- Weight: 99 kg (218 lb)

Sport
- Country: Germany
- Sport: Athletics
- Event: Hammer throw
- Club: Bayer Leverkusen

Achievements and titles
- Personal best: 81.10 m (2006)
Medal record
Representing Germany
World Championships
Bronze medal – third place	2005 Helsinki	Hammer throw
European Championships
Bronze medal – third place	2006 Gothenburg	Hammer throw

Markus Esser (born 3 February 1980 in Leverkusen) is a retired German hammer throw. His personal best is 81.10 metres, achieved in July 2006 in Leverkusen. This ranks him eighth among German hammer throwers, behind Ralf Haber, Heinz Weis, Karsten Kobs, Günther Rodehau, Holger Klose, Christoph Sahner and Klaus Ploghaus.

He won his only major international medal, the bronze at 2006 European Championships retrospectively after the disqualification of the original winner, Belarusian Ivan Tikhon.

== Achievements ==
Year	Competition	Venue	Position	Notes
Representing Germany
1997	European Junior Championships	San Sebastián, Spain	16th	60.58 m
1998	World Junior Championships	Annecy, France	12th	59.58 m
1999	European Junior Championships	Riga, Latvia	3rd	66.68 m
2000	Olympic Games	Sydney, Australia	35th (q)	69.51 m
2001	European U23 Championships	Amsterdam, Netherlands	7th	72.36 m
2002	European Championships	Munich, Germany	29th (q)	70.15 m
2004	Olympic Games	Athens, Greece	11th	72.51 m
2005	World Championships	Helsinki, Finland	3rd	79.16 m
2005	IAAF World Athletics Final	Monte Carlo, Monaco	7th	75.88 m
2006	European Championships	Gothenburg, Sweden	3rd	79.19 m
2006	IAAF World Athletics Final	Stuttgart, Germany	4th	79.19 m
2007	World Championships	Osaka, Japan	8th	79.66 m
2008	Olympic Games	Beijing, PR China	7th	77.10 m
2009	World Championships	Berlin, Germany	6th	76.27 m
2010	European Championships	Barcelona, Spain	19th (q)	71.89 m
2011	World Championships	Daegu, South Korea	4th	79.12 m
2012	European Championships	Helsinki, Finland	7th	74.49 m
2013	World Championships	Moscow, Russia	10th	76.25 m
