= Miloslav Konopka =

Slovak hammer thrower

Miloslav Konopka (born 23 January 1979 in Rimavská Sobota) is a male hammer thrower from Slovakia. His personal best throw is 81.33 metres, achieved in May 2004 in Banská Bystrica.

== International competitions ==
Year	Competition	Venue	Position	Notes
Representing Slovakia
1998	World Junior Championships	Annecy, France	5th	67.09 m
2000	Olympic Games	Sydney, Australia	32nd (q)	70.55 m
2001	European U23 Championships	Amsterdam, Netherlands	3rd	76.28 m
2001	World Championships	Edmonton, Canada	28th (q)	72.14 m
2002	European Championships	Munich, Germany	10th	77.33 m
2003	World Championships	Paris, France	9th	75.86 m
2003	World Military Games	Catania, Italy	1st	75.59 m
2004	Olympic Games	Athens, Greece	14th (q)	76.16 m
2005	World Championships	Helsinki, Finland	18th (q)	72.91 m
2006	European Championships	Gothenburg, Sweden	13th (q)	74.64 m
2007	World Championships	Osaka, Japan	10th	78.09 m
2007	World Athletics Final	Stuttgart, Germany	4th	77.95 m
2008	Olympic Games	Beijing, PR China	23rd (q)	71.96 m
