= Yuriy Voronkin =

Russian hammer thrower

Yuriy Voronkin (Russian: Юрий Воронкин; born 18 May 1979) is a Russian hammer thrower. His personal best throw is 78.69 metres, achieved in June 2003 in Tula.

He won the silver medal at the 1998 World Junior Championships. On senior level he competed at the 2004 Olympic Games without reaching the final.

== Achievements ==
Year	Competition	Venue	Position	Notes
Representing Russia
1998	World Junior Championships	Annecy, France	2nd	69.66 m
2001	European U23 Championships	Amsterdam, Netherlands	6th	72.49 m
2004	Olympic Games	Athens, Greece	24th	73.47 m
