= Wojciech Kondratowicz =

Polish hammer thrower (born 1980)

Wojciech Kondratowicz (born 18 April 1980) is a male hammer thrower from Poland. He set his personal best (81.35 metres) on 13 July 2003 in Bydgoszcz.

== Achievements ==
Year	Competition	Venue	Position	Notes
Representing Poland
1998	World Junior Championships	Annecy, France	3rd	68.93 m
1999	European Junior Championships	Riga, Latvia	2nd	74.12 m
2001	European U23 Championships	Amsterdam, Netherlands	4th	75.29 m
2003	World Championships	Paris, France	25th	70.79 m
2010	European Championships	Barcelona, Spain	7th	75.30 m
