= Olli-Pekka Karjalainen =

Finnish hammer thrower (born 1980)

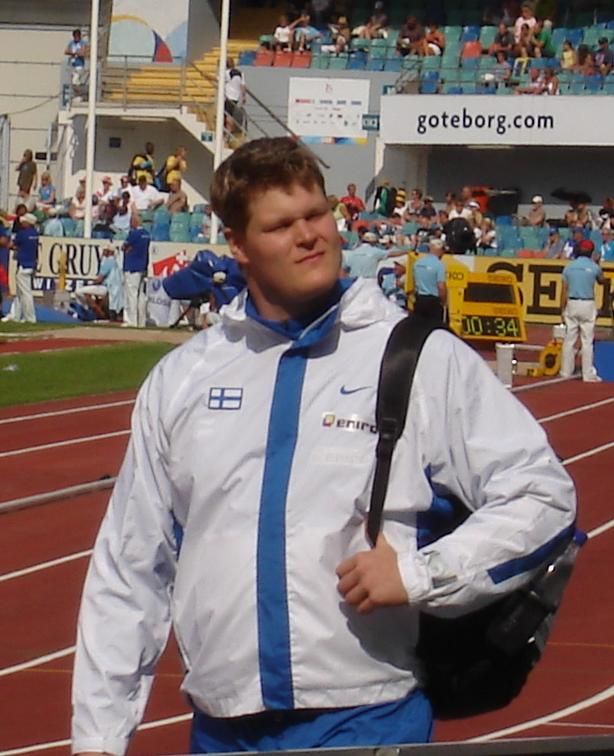
- Karjalainen in Gothenburg 2006

Personal information
- Nationality: Finnish
- Born: 7 March 1980 (age 46) Töysä, Finland
- Height: 1.94 m (6 ft 4 in)
- Weight: 115 kg (254 lb)

Sport
- Sport: Track and field
- Event: Hammer throw

Achievements and titles
- Personal best: 83.30 (NR)
Medal record
Men's athletics
Representing Finland
European Championships
Gold medal – first place	2006 Gothenburg

Olli-Pekka Karjalainen (born 7 March 1980) is a Finnish former hammer thrower. The 1998 World Junior Champion, Karjalainen is the world junior record holder with 78.33 metres (7.26 kg). His personal best throw and the Finnish record is 83.30, achieved in July 2004 in Lahti.

== European Championships 2006 ==
Karjalainen took his first medal at the 2006 European Championships by throwing 80.84. He finished second, but became the Champion in 2014 as IAAF decided to strip Ivan Tskikhan of Belarus of the gold medal for doping. Karjalainen was awarded with the gold medal in a ceremony arranged at the 2014 Finland-Sweden athletics international in Helsinki.

== Achievements ==
Year	Competition	Venue	Position	Notes
Representing Finland
1998	World Junior Championships	Annecy, France	1st	72.40 m
1998	European Championships	Budapest, Hungary	24th	73.13 m
1999	World Championships	Seville, Spain	11th	75.59 m
1999	European Junior Championships	Riga, Latvia	1st	75.80 m
2000	Olympic Games	Sydney, Australia	34th	69.64 m
2001	European U23 Championships	Amsterdam, Netherlands	2nd	80.54 m
2001	World Championships	Edmonton, Canada	10th	76.76 m
2002	European Championships	Munich, Germany	8th	78.57 m
2003	World Championships	Paris, France	14th	76.20 m
2004	Olympic Games	Athens, Greece	15th	76.11 m
2004	World Athletics Final	Szombathely, Hungary	1st	81.43 m
2005	World Championships	Helsinki, Finland	4th	78.77 m
2005	World Athletics Final	Szombathely, Hungary	1st	79.81 m
2006	European Championships	Gothenburg, Sweden	1st	80.84 m
2006	World Athletics Final	Stuttgart, Germany	6th	78.47 m
2007	World Championships	Osaka, Japan	9th	78.35 m
2008	Finnish Championships	Tampere, Finland	1st	77.93 m
2008	Olympic Games	Beijing, China	6th	79.59 m
2009	Finnish Championships	Espoo, Finland	1st	77.76 m
2009	World Championships	Berlin, Germany	16th	74.09 m
2010	European Championships	Barcelona, Spain	10th	73.70 m
2011	World Championships	Daegu, South Korea	9th	76.60 m
