= Vladyslav Piskunov =

Ukrainian hammer thrower

Personal information
- Native name: Владислав Юрійовин Ліскунов
- Full name: Vladyslav Yuriyovych Piskunov
- Nationality: Ukrainian
- Born: 7 June 1978 (age 48) Nova Kakhovka, Ukrainian SSR, Soviet Union
- Height: 1.83 m (6 ft 0 in)
- Weight: 106 kg (234 lb)

Sport
- Country: Ukraine
- Sport: Athletics
- Event: Hammer throw

Achievements and titles
- Personal best: 82.23 m (2002)
Medal record
Men's Athletics
Representing Ukraine
World Championships
Bronze medal – third place	1999 Seville	Hammer throw
European Championships
Silver medal – second place	2002 Munich	Hammer throw
Summer Universiade
Silver medal – second place	2001 Beijing	Hammer throw
Bronze medal – third place	1999 Palma de Mallorca	Hammer throw
European Throwing Cup
Silver medal – second place	2001 Nice	Hammer throw

Vladyslav Yuriyovych Piskunov (Ukrainian: Владислав Юрійович Піскунов; born 7 June 1978 in Nova Kakhovka, Kherson) is a former Ukrainian hammer thrower.

Piskunov originally won a gold medal at the 1994 World Junior Championships, but failed a drugs test and became disqualified. At the 2005 World Championships he failed another test and received a life ban.

His personal best throw was 82.23 metres, achieved in April 2002 in Koncha-Zaspa.

== Achievements ==
Year	Competition	Venue	Position	Notes
Representing Ukraine
1994	World Junior Championships	Lisbon, Portugal	—	DQ
1998	European Championships	Budapest, Hungary	10th	75.10 m
1999	European U23 Championships	Gothenburg, Sweden	1st	76.26 m
1999	World Championships	Seville, Spain	3rd	79.03 m
1999	Universiade	Palma de Mallorca, Spain	3rd	78.61 m
2000	Olympic Games	Sydney, Australia	14th	76.08 m
2001	Universiade	Beijing, PR China	2nd	77.99 m
2001	World Championships	Edmonton, Canada	14th	76.34 m
2002	European Championships	Munich, Germany	2nd	80.39 m
2003	Military World Games	Catania, Italy	2nd	74.88 m
2003	World Championships	Paris, France	16th	75.65 m
2004	Olympic Games	Athens, Greece	—	NM

== See also ==
- List of doping cases in athletics
