= Aleksey Zagornyi =

Russian hammer thrower

Personal information
- Native name: Алексей Сергеевич Эагорныӣ
- Full name: Aleksey Sergeyevich Zagornyi
- Born: May 31, 1978 (age 48) Yaroslavl, Soviet Union
- Height: 1.97 m (6 ft 5 1/2 in)
- Weight: 135 kg (298 lb)

Sport
- Country: Russia
- Sport: Men's athletics
- Event: Hammer throw

Achievements and titles
- Personal best: 83.43 m (2002)
Medal record
World Championships
Bronze medal – third place	2009 Berlin	Hammer
- Updated on 14 August 2012

Aleksey Sergeyevich Zagornyi (Russian: Алексей Сергеевич Загорный; born 31 May 1978 in Yaroslavl) is a Russian hammer thrower. His personal best is 83.43 metres, achieved in February 2002 in Adler.

== International competitions ==
Representing Russia
Year	Competition	Venue	Position	Notes
1999	European U23 Championships	Gothenburg, Sweden	7th	71.33 m
2000	Olympic Games	Sydney, Australia	22nd	74.63 m
2001	World Student Games	Beijing, China	4th	76.63 m
2002	European Championships	Munich, Germany	11th	77.01 m
2003	World Championships	Paris, France	22nd	73.30 m
2007	World Championships	Osaka, Japan	25th	70.94 m
2009	World Championships	Berlin, Germany	3rd	78.09 m
2009	World Athletics Final	Thessaloniki, Greece	4th	77.26 m
2010	European Cup Winter Throwing	Arles, France	3rd	75.58 m
