= Athletics at the 2004 Summer Olympics – Men's hammer throw =

Men's hammer throw at the Games of the XXVIII Olympiad
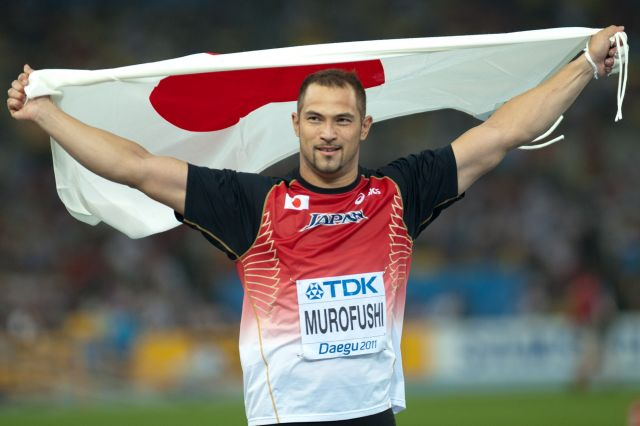
- Koji Murofushi (2011)
- Venue: Olympic Stadium
- Dates: 20–22 August
- Competitors: 35 from 24 nations
- Winning distance: 82.91

Medalists
1st place, gold medalist(s)		Koji Murofushi	Japan
2nd place, silver medalist(s)		not awarded	
3rd place, bronze medalist(s)		not awarded	

The men's hammer throw competition at the 2004 Summer Olympics in Athens was held at the Olympic Stadium on 20–22 August. There were 35 competitors from 24 nations. After a series of doping-related disqualifications, the event was won by Koji Murofushi of Japan, the nation's first medal in the event. All distances are given in metres.

== Disqualifications ==
The event was marred by doping-related disqualifications, with the original first- and third-place athletes being removed. Adrián Annus of Hungary originally won the competition, but he was disqualified after being found guilty of tampering with his sample at the doping control. The original runner-up, Koji Murofushi, was accordingly declared the 2004 Olympic champion.

Originally, Ivan Tsikhan won the bronze medal. With Annus's disqualification, Tsikhan moved up to the silver medal. However, he was disqualified in 2012 after a retest of his samples from 2004 were positive for methandienone. Tsikhan withdrew from the 2012 Summer Olympics as a result. The silver and bronze medal were not re-awarded. The athlete in a position to be elevated to the Olympic silver medal, Eşref Apak of Turkey, received a 2-year doping ban in 2013 for the use of a prohibited substance, which lasted from 8 June 2013 to 25 June 2015. The athlete in a position to be elevated to the Olympic bronze medal, Vadim Devyatovskiy of Belarus, had previously been subject to a court case by the International Olympic Committee regarding doping at the 2008 Summer Olympics. Аs the next two finishers Eşref Apak and Vadim Devyatovskiy had both been suspended from the sport for doping offenses since 2004, the IOC decided to declare the silver and bronze medals vacant, leaving the only medalists as Murofushi with gold (in the official publication of the results, Eşref Apak is listed second, but without getting a silver medal, Vadim Devyatovskiy is listed third, but without getting a bronze medal).

== Background ==
This was the 24th appearance of the event, which has been held at every Summer Olympics except 1896. Seven of the 12 finalists from the 2000 Games returned: gold medalist (and 1996 finalist) Szymon Ziółkowski of Poland, silver medalist Nicola Vizzoni of Italy, bronze medalist (and 1992 silver medalist and 1996 finalist) Igor Astapkovich of Belarus, fifth-place finisher (and 1996 finalist) Ilya Konovalov of Russia, eighth-place finisher Vladimír Maška of the Czech Republic, ninth-place finisher Koji Murofushi of Japan, and twelfth-place finisher Alexandros Papadimitriou of Greece. The last two World Champions were Ziółkowski (2001) and Ivan Tsikhan of Belarus (2003). Tikhon, 2002 European champion Adrián Annus of Hungary, and Murofushi (bronze medalist in the 2003 World Championship and who, in 2003, had the best throw of anyone since 1986—a mark that is still, in 2021, the fourth-best throw of all time) were the favorites.

Albania, Tajikistan, and Turkey each made their debut in the event. The United States appeared for the 23rd time, most of any nation, having missed only the boycotted 1980 Games.

== Qualification ==
The qualification period for Athletics was 1 January 2003 to 9 August 2004. For the men's hammer throw, each National Olympic Committee was permitted to enter up to three athletes that had thrown 78.65 metres or further during the qualification period. The maximum number of athletes per nation had been set at 3 since the 1930 Olympic Congress. If an NOC had no athletes that qualified under that standard, one athlete that had thrown 74.35 metres or further could be entered.

== Competition format ==
Each athlete received three throws in the qualifying round. All who achieved the qualifying distance of 78.00 metres progressed to the final. If fewer than twelve athletes achieved this mark, then the twelve furthest throwing athletes would reach the final. Each finalist was allowed three throws in last round, with the top eight athletes after that point being given three further attempts.

== Records ==
Prior to the competition, the existing world and Olympic records were as follows.

World record	Yuriy Sedykh (URS)	86.74	Stuttgart, West Germany	30 August 1986
Olympic record	Sergey Litvinov (URS)	84.80	Seoul, South Korea	26 September 1988

No new records were set during the competition.

== Schedule ==
All times are Greece Standard Time (UTC+2)

Date	Time	Round
Friday, 20 August 2004	9:15	Qualifying
Sunday, 22 August 2004	21:15	Final

== Results ==
=== Qualifying ===
Rule: Qualifying standard 78.00 (Q) or at least best 12 qualified (q).

Rank	Group	Athlete	Nation	1	2	3	Distance	Notes
1	B	Ivan Tsikhan	Belarus	77.85	77.12	80.78	80.78	Q
2	A	Adrián Annus	Hungary	79.59	—	—	79.59	Q
3	B	Krisztián Pars	Hungary	77.43	80.50	—	80.50	Q
4	B	Koji Murofushi	Japan	79.55	—	—	79.55	Q
5	B	Primož Kozmus	Slovenia	76.97	78.81	—	78.81	Q, SB
6	A	Markus Esser	Germany	76.39	75.29	77.49	77.49	q
7	B	Libor Charfreitag	Slovakia	X	X	77.30	77.30	q
8	A	Igor Astapkovich	Belarus	76.70	76.08	76.88	76.88	q
9	B	Nicola Vizzoni	Italy	76.84	75.35	75.03	76.84	q
10	A	Eşref Apak	Turkey	X	X	76.74	76.74	q
11	B	Vadim Devyatovskiy	Belarus	71.69	74.81	76.72	76.72	q
12	B	Karsten Kobs	Germany	76.69	X	X	76.69	q
13	A	Ilya Konovalov	Russia	75.40	X	76.36	76.36	
14	A	Szymon Ziółkowski	Poland	76.12	74.55	76.17	76.17	
15	B	Miloslav Konopka	Slovakia	74.42	X	76.16	76.16	
16	A	Olli-Pekka Karjalainen	Finland	X	74.51	76.11	76.11	
17	B	Sergey Kirmasov	Russia	75.12	73.68	75.83	75.83	
18	A	Aléxandros Papadimitríou	Greece	X	X	75.55	75.55	
19	A	Oleksandr Krykun	Ukraine	X	75.42	74.37	75.42	
20	B	Artem Rubanko	Ukraine	75.08	X	X	75.08	
21	B	James Parker	United States	73.15	74.09	75.04	75.04	
22	B	András Haklits	Croatia	X	73.51	74.43	74.43	
23	B	David Söderberg	Finland	X	X	74.14	74.14	
24	A	Patric Suter	Switzerland	72.45	X	73.54	73.54	
25	B	Yuriy Voronkin	Russia	73.47	71.97	X	73.47	
26	A	Stuart Rendell	Australia	X	72.61	X	72.61	
27	A	Juan Ignacio Cerra	Argentina	69.10	72.53	68.64	72.53	
28	A	Vítor Costa	Portugal	72.47	72.44	X	72.47	
29	A	Roman Rozna	Moldova	X	X	71.78	71.78	
30	A	Vladimír Maška	Czech Republic	71.76	X	X	71.76	
31	B	Ali Al-Zinkawi	Kuwait	70.67	71.06	70.68	71.06	
32	B	Dorian Çollaku	Albania	70.06	69.27	67.61	70.06	
33	A	A.G. Kruger	United States	69.38	68.03	X	69.38	
—	A	Vladyslav Piskunov	Ukraine	X	X	X	NM	
—	A	Dilshod Nazarov	Tajikistan	X	X	X	NM	

=== Final ===
Rank	Athlete	Nation	1	2	3	4	5	6	Distance	Notes
1st place, gold medalist(s)	Koji Murofushi	Japan	79.90	81.60	81.16	82.35	X	82.91	82.91	SB
	Silver medal not awarded									^{[note]}
	Bronze medal not awarded									^{[note]}
2	Eşref Apak	Turkey	75.79	79.51	X	79.23	75.15	76.34	79.51	^{[note]}
3	Vadim Devyatovskiy	Belarus	78.67	78.82	X	75.41	76.61	X	78.82	^{[note]}
4	Krisztián Pars	Hungary	76.94	78.16	77.55	78.73	X	77.26	78.73	
5	Primož Kozmus	Slovenia	75.82	77.08	76.45	78.56	77.61	78.24	78.56	
6	Libor Charfreitag	Slovakia	74.93	77.52	77.30	75.60	77.54	73.06	77.54	
7	Karsten Kobs	Germany	75.72	75.97	76.30	Did not advance			76.30	
8	Igor Astapkovich	Belarus	X	X	76.22	Did not advance			76.22	
9	Nicola Vizzoni	Italy	74.27	72.97	73.02	Did not advance			74.27	
10	Markus Esser	Germany	72.51	X	71.31	Did not advance			72.51	
—	Adrián Annus	Hungary	~~80.53~~	~~82.32~~	~~83.19~~	~~82.64~~	~~82.04~~	—	~~83.19~~	DPG
—	Ivan Tsikhan	Belarus	X	X	~~78.55~~	~~78.31~~	~~79.81~~	X	~~79.81~~	DPG

^{note} IOC decided to declare the silver and bronze medals vacant (in the official publication of the results, Eşref Apak is listed second, but without getting a silver medal, Vadim Devyatovskiy is listed third, but without getting a bronze medal).
