= Nicolas Figère =

French hammer thrower (born 1979)

Personal information
- Born: May 19, 1979 (age 46)
- Height: 1.76 m (5 ft 9 1/2 in)
- Weight: 70 kg (154 lb)

Sport
- Country: France
- Sport: Athletics
- Event: Hammer throw
- Updated on 14 August 2012

Nicolas Figère (born 19 May 1979 in Moulins) is a male hammer thrower from France. His personal best throw is 80.88 metres, achieved in July 2001 in Amsterdam.

In 2007 he tested positive for doping, in an in-competition test conducted at the 2007 European Cup in Munich. He received a one-month suspension.

== Achievements ==
Year	Competition	Venue	Position	Notes
Representing France
1998	World Junior Championships	Annecy, France	6th	65.98 m
1999	European U23 Championships	Gothenburg, Sweden	9th	69.36 m
2001	European U23 Championships	Amsterdam, Netherlands	1st	80.88 m
2001	World Championships	Edmonton, Canada	12th	75.36 m
2002	European Championships	Munich, Germany	12th	76.49 m
2003	World Championships	Paris, France	11th	74.06 m
2005	Mediterranean Games	Almería, Spain	3rd	75.30 m
2010	European Championships	Barcelona, Spain	11th	72.56 m
