= Dzmitry Shako =

Belarusian hammer thrower (born 1979)

Dzmitry Shako (Belarusian: Дзмітрый Шако; born 25 March 1979) is a male hammer thrower from Belarus. He set his personal best (78.54 metres) in the men's hammer throw event on 27 July 2008 in Minsk.

== Achievements ==
| Year | Competition | Venue | Position | Notes |
Representing Belarus
| 2009 | World Championships | Berlin, Germany | 25th | 71.80 m |
