= Adrián Annus =

Hungarian hammer thrower

Personal information
- Full name: Adrián Zsolt Annus
- Nationality: Hungarian
- Born: 28 June 1973 (age 53) Szeged, Hungary
- Height: 1.94 m (6 ft 4 in)
- Weight: 115 kg (254 lb)

Sport
- Country: Hungary
- Sport: Athletics
- Event: Hammer throw

Achievements and titles
- Personal best: 84.19 m (2003)
Medal record
Men's athletics
Olympic Games
| Disqualified | 2004 Athens | Hammer throw |
World Championships
| Silver medal – second place | 2003 Paris | Hammer throw |
European Championships
| Gold medal – first place | 2002 Munich | Hammer throw |
Summer Universiade
| Bronze medal – third place | 2001 Beijing | Hammer throw |

Adrián Zsolt Annus (born 28 June 1973 in Szeged) is a Hungarian hammer thrower, who was stripped of his gold medal at the 2004 Summer Olympic Games in Athens for a doping violation in a highly publicized scandal. The disqualification received heightened attention, as it came on the heels of several drug scandals at the Athens Games and came as Annus' teammate, discus thrower Róbert Fazekas was also stripped of his Olympic title for a doping violation. The incident also received attention, as Annus refused for several months to return his gold medal, relenting only after the International Olympic Committee put pressure on the Hungarian Olympic Committee and threatened sanctions.

== Career ==
Annus grew up in Gyula and moved to Szombathely in 1989. His first coach was Géza Annus, but joined Haladás VSE, the Szombathely sports club after his move. At Haladás Gyula Simon coached him, before Pál Németh took over. His first significant result came in 1992, when he finished eleventh in the discus throw at the World Junior Championship in Seoul.

In 1998, Adrián Annus finished eighth in the hammer at the European Championships in Budapest. This strong showing made Annus a potential contender for a medal at the 2000 Summer Olympic Games, but he was initially left out of the team due to stiff competition for a spot on the team. He eventually received a spot on the team due to an injury, but was not in top form to be a real contender and finished seventeenth.

Following the 2000 Olympics, Annus broke with his coach, Pál Németh, and joined József Vida.

2002 and 2003 were among his best years. In 2002 he won the European Championship and in 2003 he took silver at the World Championship. He also won the 2003 World Athletic Final. This achievement earned him the title 2003 Hungarian Sportsman of the Year.

== Drug scandal ==
In 2004, Annus was favored to win in Athens, but was stripped of his medal just a few days after winning, losing the gold medal to Koji Murofushi. The International Olympic Committee concluded, that his urine samples—taken before and after competition—showed evidence of belonging to different people, therefore indicating tampering. The IOC also attempted to test Annus shortly after his competition in Athens, but Annus refused the test, which by itself warranted his disqualification.

The IOC never officially concluded how it was possible for Annus to provide samples that belonged to different people, but track and field insiders said he likely used a device, which included a container for urine and a fake penis and emptied the container into the testing bottle when required to provide a sample.

Following a rejected appeal and a hearing by the Court of Arbitration for Sport, Annus was banned for two years. Following the ban, Annus began training and started competing in 2007.

== Results ==
- 1996: Atlanta, Olympic Games, 28th
- 1998: Budapest, European Championships 8th
- 2000: Sydney, Olympic Games 17th
- 2001: Edmonton, World Championships 9th
- 2001: Beijing, Summer Universiade, 3rd
- 2002: Münich, European Champions, 1st
- 2002: Madrid, World Cup, 1st
- 2002: Paris, Grand Prix, 2nd
- 2003: Szombathely, Hungary, MAL Cup, 84 meter 19 cm - Hungarian record
- 2003: Paris, World Championships, 2nd
- 2003: Szombathely (Hungary), World Athletics Final, 1st

== Awards ==
- Hungarian athlete of the Year (1): 2003

== See also ==
- List of sportspeople sanctioned for doping offences

Awards
| Preceded by Szilveszter Csollány | Hungarian Sportsman of The Year; 2003 | Succeeded by István Majoros |
