= Athletics at the 2003 Summer Universiade – Men's hammer throw =

The men's hammer throw event at the 2003 Summer Universiade was held on 27 August in Daegu, South Korea.

The winning margin was an astounding 8.36 metres which as of 2024 remains the only time the men's hammer throw was won by more than five metres at these games.

== Results ==
Rank	Athlete	Nationality	#1	#2	#3	#4	#5	#6	Result	Notes
1st place, gold medalist(s)	Ivan Tsikhan	Belarus	x	78.63	82.13	82.77	79.52	x	82.77	GR
2nd place, silver medalist(s)	Péter Botfa	Hungary	x	x	71.00	73.75	74.41	x	74.41	
3rd place, bronze medalist(s)	David Söderberg	Finland	71.15	x	71.61	x	x	72.84	72.84	
4	Lukáš Melich	Czech Republic	70.40	x	71.26	69.24	x	x	71.26	
5	Jarkko Paljakka	Finland	70.02	70.43	69.24	x	70.70	70.49	70.70	
6	Moisés Campeny	Spain	68.58	69.50	66.45	69.60	67.09	x	69.60	
7	Roman Rozna	Moldova	x	69.02	x	x	x	x	69.02	
8	Andrei Varantsou	Belarus	x	63.83	x	65.81	x	x	65.81	
9	Lee Ywun-chol	South Korea	62.89	61.43	63.52				63.52	
