= Athletics at the 2001 Summer Universiade – Men's hammer throw =

The men's hammer throw event at the 2001 Summer Universiade was held at the Workers Stadium in Beijing, China on 29 August.

== Results ==
Rank	Athlete	Nationality	Result	Notes
1st place, gold medalist(s)	Nicola Vizzoni	Italy	78.41	
2nd place, silver medalist(s)	Vladyslav Piskunov	Ukraine	77.99	
3rd place, bronze medalist(s)	Adrián Annus	Hungary	77.73	
4	Aleksey Zagornyi	Russia	76.63	
5	Chris Harmse	South Africa	76.07	
6	Ivan Tsikhan	Belarus	75.36	
7	Andrei Varantsou	Belarus	73.69	
8	Vadim Khersontsev	Russia	73.47	
9	Cosmin Sorescu	Romania	70.25	
10	Libor Charfreitag	Slovakia	69.49	
11	Roman Rozna	Moldova	66.71	
12	Dilshod Nazarov	Tajikistan	66.10	
13	Jay Harvard	United States	64.59	
14	Rosen Zhelev	Bulgaria	60.08	
15	Lucas Andino	Argentina	58.55	
	James Parker	United States	NM	
	Hamad Al-Mahdi	Qatar	DNS	
