= Conny Karlsson =

Conny Karlsson may refer to:

- Conny Karlsson (footballer) (born 1953), Swedish football manager and former player
- Conny Karlsson (shot putter) (born 1975), Finnish shot putter
