= Stefanie Biller =

German swimmer (born 1985)

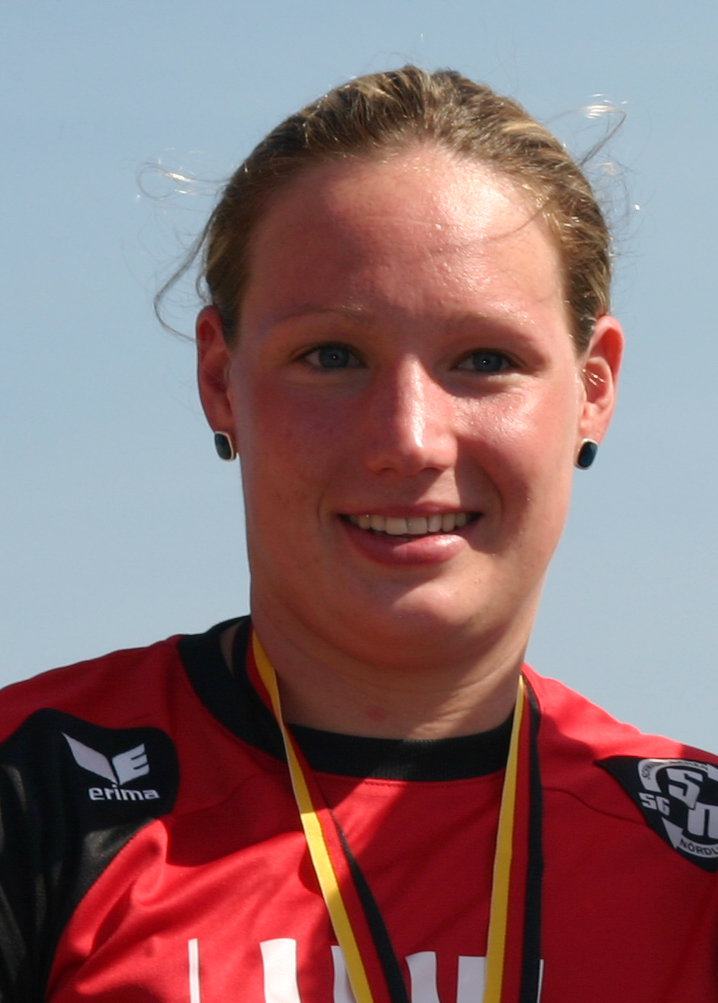
- Biller in 2009

Personal information
- Born: 30 October 1985 (age 40) Augsburg, Germany

Sport
- Sport: Swimming
- Club: Team Bath Swimming Club
Medal record
Representing Germany
European Championships
| Silver medal – second place | 2004 Madrid | 5 km open water |
| Bronze medal – third place | 2006 Budapest | 25 km open water |

Stefanie Bircher (née Biller, born 30 October 1985) is a long-distance swimmer from Germany. She has twice won medals at the European Championships, whereas her best achievements at the world championships were fourth place in 2004 and fifth place in 2006 in 25 km.

She previously trained at the University of Bath where she studied for a Foundation Degree in Sports Performance. She shared the same coach (Andrei Vorontsov) as her Bath team mate, British distance swimmer Alan Bircher whom she later married in 2011.
