= 1997 European Athletics U23 Championships – Men's hammer throw =

The men's hammer throw event at the 1997 European Athletics U23 Championships was held in Turku, Finland, on 10 and 11 July 1997.

== Medalists ==
Gold	Ivan Tikhon; Belarus
Silver	Szymon Ziółkowski; Poland
Bronze	Nikolay Avalasevich; Belarus

== Results ==
=== Final ===
11 July

Rank	Name	Nationality	Attempts						Result	Notes
Rank	Name	Nationality	1	2	3	4	5	6	Result	Notes
1st place, gold medalist(s)	Ivan Tikhon	Belarus	73.02	76.08	75.24	77.46	x	x	77.46	
2nd place, silver medalist(s)	Szymon Ziółkowski	Poland	73.10	x	x	x	x	73.68	73.68	
3rd place, bronze medalist(s)	Nikolay Avalasevich	Belarus	70.22	72.40	x	71.02	69.16	68.64	72.40	
4	Mikko Dannback	Finland	65.58	x	70.48	65.54	67.98	69.72	70.48	
5	Roman Konevtsov	Russia	67.76	70.24	69.76	64.88	68.22	70.30	70.30	
6	Stefan Paukner	Germany	67.96	x	69.56	x	66.90	67.12	69.56	
7	Igor Tugay	Ukraine	68.96	68.58	67.84	68.28	68.62	63.78	68.96	
8	Edi Marioni	Italy	66.24	68.00	65.14	65.50	x	x	68.00	
9	Oleg Sergeyev	Russia	66.76	67.38	65.26				67.38	
10	Tero Salmela	Finland	67.06	x	x				67.06	
11	Norbert Horváth	Hungary	65.40	65.84	64.42				65.84	
12	Xavier Tison	France	63.92	64.20	63.42				64.20	

=== Qualifications ===
10 July
Qualify: first to 12 to the Final

Rank	Name	Nationality	Result	Notes
1	Ivan Tikhon	Belarus	75.86	Q
2	Szymon Ziółkowski	Poland	71.66	Q
3	Nikolay Avalasevich	Belarus	70.26	Q
4	Igor Tugay	Ukraine	69.96	Q
5	Roman Konevtsov	Russia	68.18	Q
6	Oleg Sergeyev	Russia	67.96	Q
7	Stefan Paukner	Germany	67.60	Q
8	Mikko Dannback	Finland	67.58	Q
9	Tero Salmela	Finland	67.56	Q
10	Edi Marioni	Italy	67.10	Q
11	Xavier Tison	France	66.06	Q
12	Norbert Horváth	Hungary	66.00	Q
13	András Haklits	Hungary	65.32	
14	Cosmin Sorescu	Romania	64.26	
15	Bjørn Pettersen	Norway	64.08	
16	Dorian Çollaku	Albania	63.06	
17	Kamil Yardımcı	Turkey	52.94	

== Participation ==
According to an unofficial count, 17 athletes from 13 countries participated in the event.

- Albania (1)
- Belarus (2)
- Finland (2)
- France (1)
- Germany (1)
- Hungary (2)
- Italy (1)
- Norway (1)
- Poland (1)
- Romania (1)
- Russia (2)
- Turkey (1)
- Ukraine (1)
