= 1994 World Junior Championships in Athletics – Men's shot put =

The men's shot put event at the 1994 World Junior Championships in Athletics was held in Lisbon, Portugal, at Estádio Universitário de Lisboa on 22 and 23 July. A 7.26 kg (Senior implement) shot was used.

== Medalists ==
Gold	Adam Nelson; United States
Silver	Andreas Gustafsson; Sweden
Bronze	Ville Tiisanoja; Finland

== Results ==
=== Final ===
23 July

Rank	Name	Nationality	Attempts						Result	Notes
Rank	Name	Nationality	1	2	3	4	5	6	Result	Notes
1st place, gold medalist(s)	Adam Nelson	United States	18.34	17.80	17.89	x	17.46	16.92	18.34	
2nd place, silver medalist(s)	Andreas Gustafsson	Sweden	17.95	x	17.64	x	16.98	17.23	17.95	
3rd place, bronze medalist(s)	Ville Tiisanoja	Finland	17.90	16.87	x	17.37	x	17.57	17.90	
4	Leif Larsen	Norway	17.02	16.86	16.88	x	17.75	x	17.75	
5	Pavol Pankúch	Slovakia	16.86	17.16	16.61	16.56	16.67	x	17.16	
6	Conny Karlsson	Finland	15.13	16.58	16.43	17.08	16.58	16.99	17.08	
7	Gunnar Pfingsten	Germany	16.95	15.77	16.00	16.42	x	16.73	16.95	
8	Christian Nehme	Germany	16.25	16.16	16.63	x	16.29	15.78	16.63	
9	Carlos Gerones	Spain	16.49	14.97	15.96				16.49	
10	Jason Tunks	Canada	15.94	x	16.21				16.21	
11	Jason Stuke	United States	16.19	16.11	15.88				16.19	
12	Justin Anlezark	Australia	15.27	15.67	15.23				15.67	

=== Qualifications ===
22 Jul

==== Group A ====
Rank	Name	Nationality	Attempts			Result	Notes
Rank	Name	Nationality	1	2	3	Result	Notes
1	Adam Nelson	United States	15.90	x	17.56	17.56	Q
2	Andreas Gustafsson	Sweden	17.49	-	-	17.49	Q
3	Leif Larsen	Norway	17.30	-	-	17.30	Q
4	Ville Tiisanoja	Finland	16.75	-	-	16.75	Q
5	Jason Stuke	United States	16.11	16.39	16.62	16.62	Q
6	Gunnar Pfingsten	Germany	16.62	-	-	16.62	Q
7	Carlos Gerones	Spain	16.05	16.46	-	16.46	Q
8	Conny Karlsson	Finland	16.46	-	-	16.46	Q
9	Pavol Pankúch	Slovakia	16.23	16.09	x	16.23	q
10	Jason Tunks	Canada	15.66	15.51	16.17	16.17	q
11	Christian Nehme	Germany	16.17	x	15.64	16.17	q
12	Justin Anlezark	Australia	15.44	14.35	16.01	16.01	q
13	Emmanuel Hostache	France	x	15.71	x	15.71	
14	Brad Snyder	Canada	15.65	x	15.64	15.65	
15	Felix Hyde	Ghana	15.03	15.59	x	15.59	
16	Walid Jamil Mustapha	Egypt	x	13.68	-	13.68	
17	Jorge Vázquez	Paraguay	12.19	11.22	11.65	12.19	

== Participation ==
According to an unofficial count, 17 athletes from 13 countries participated in the event.

- Australia (1)
- Canada (2)
- Egypt (1)
- Finland (2)
- France (1)
- Germany (2)
- Ghana (1)
- Norway (1)
- Paraguay (1)
- Slovakia (1)
- Spain (1)
- Sweden (1)
- United States (2)
