= 1997 European Athletics U23 Championships – Men's shot put =

The men's shot put event at the 1997 European Athletics U23 Championships was held in Turku, Finland, on 10 July 1997.

== Medalists ==
Gold	Conny Karlsson; Finland
Silver	Gunnar Pfingsten; Germany
Bronze	Andreas Gustafsson; Sweden

== Results ==
=== Final ===
10 July

Rank	Name	Nationality	Attempts						Result	Notes
Rank	Name	Nationality	1	2	3	4	5	6	Result	Notes
1st place, gold medalist(s)	Conny Karlsson	Finland	19.27	19.13	19.35	19.48	x	18.96	19.48	
2nd place, silver medalist(s)	Gunnar Pfingsten	Germany	18.33	x	18.69	x	19.11	18.70	19.11	
3rd place, bronze medalist(s)	Andreas Gustafsson	Sweden	18.93	19.09	19.08	x	x	18.64	19.09	
4	Ville Tiisanoja	Finland	18.42	19.01	18.75	18.56	x	18.99	19.01	
5	Przemysław Zabawski	Poland	18.22	18.72	x	18.18	x	x	18.72	
6	Andrey Mikhnevich	Belarus	17.09	18.72	x	x	x	x	18.72	
7	Pavol Pankúch	Slovakia	17.50	18.16	18.39	18.42	18.26	18.09	18.42	
8	Leif Dolonen Larsen	Norway	17.30	17.96	x	17.90	17.31	17.33	17.96	
9	René Sack	Germany	17.40	17.75	17.69				17.75	
10	Petr Stehlík	Czech Republic	17.62	x	17.66				17.66	
11	Carles Geronés	Spain	17.38	17.54	x				17.54	
12	Sergio Mottin	Italy	x	17.00	17.22				17.22	

=== Qualifications ===
10 July
Qualify: first to 12 to the Final

Rank	Name	Nationality	Result	Notes
1	Andreas Gustafsson	Sweden	18.76	Q
2	Conny Karlsson	Finland	18.74	Q
3	Pavol Pankúch	Slovakia	18.25	Q
4	Ville Tiisanoja	Finland	18.12	Q
5	Petr Stehlík	Czech Republic	17.97	Q
6	Przemysław Zabawski	Poland	17.83	Q
7	Sergio Mottin	Italy	17.82	Q
8	Carles Geronés	Spain	17.77	Q
9	René Sack	Germany	17.73	Q
10	Gunnar Pfingsten	Germany	17.62	Q
11	Andrey Mikhnevich	Belarus	17.60	Q
12	Leif Dolonen Larsen	Norway	17.53	Q
13	Attila Pintér	Hungary	17.28	
14	Jaan Talts	Estonia	17.02	
15	Yves Niaré	France	16.90	
16	Roberto Carpene	Italy	16.73	
17	Håkan Andersson	Sweden	16.65	
18	Vitaliy Blinchik	Russia	16.60	
19	Zsolt Biber	Hungary	16.55	
	Sebastian Wenta	Poland	NM	

== Participation ==
According to an unofficial count, 20 athletes from 14 countries participated in the event.

- Belarus (1)
- Czech Republic (1)
- Estonia (1)
- Finland (1)
- France (1)
- Germany (2)
- Hungary (2)
- Italy (2)
- Norway (1)
- Poland (2)
- Russia (1)
- Slovakia (1)
- Spain (1)
- Sweden (3)
