= 2006 European Athletics Championships – Men's hammer throw =

Men's hammer throw at the European Athletics Championships

The final of the Men's Hammer Throw event at the 2006 European Championships in Gothenburg, Sweden was held on Saturday August 12, 2006. There were a total number of 24 participating athletes. The qualifying rounds were staged three days earlier, on Wednesday August 9, with the mark set in 77.50 metres.

Ivan Tsikhan had originally won the gold medal but later tested for doping and all his results between 22 August 2004 and 21 August 2006 were annulled.

== Medalists ==
Gold	Olli-Pekka Karjalainen; Finland (FIN)
Silver	Vadim Devyatovski; Belarus (BLR)
Bronze	Markus Esser; Germany (GER)

== Schedule ==
- All times are Central European Time (UTC+1)

Qualification Round
Group A	Group B
09.08.2006 – 10:05h	09.08.2006 – 11:30h
Final Round
12.08.2006 – 13:45h

== Abbreviations ==
- All results shown are in metres

Q	automatic qualification
q	qualification by rank
DNS	did not start
NM	no mark
WR	world record
AR	area record
NR	national record
PB	personal best
SB	season best

== Records ==
Standing records prior to the 2006 European Athletics Championships
World Record	Yuriy Sedykh (URS)	86.74 m	August 30, 1986	Stuttgart, West Germany
Event Record	Yuriy Sedykh (URS)	86.74 m	August 30, 1986	Stuttgart, West Germany

== Qualification ==
=== Group A ===
Rank	Overall	Athlete	Attempts			Distance
Rank	Overall	Athlete	1	2	3	Distance
1	2	Karsten Kobs (GER)	75.47	75.72	77.52	77.52 m
2	3	Krisztián Pars (HUN)	77.20	—	—	77.20 m
3	6	Szymon Ziółkowski (POL)	76.39	X	X	76.39 m
4	9	Andrey Vorontsov (BLR)	X	X	75.15	75.15 m
5	11	Marco Lingua (ITA)	74.69	X	X	74.69 m
6	13	Libor Charfreitag (SVK)	X	74.13	X	74.13 m
7	15	Vadim Khersontsev (RUS)	73.24	X	72.87	73.24 m
8	17	David Söderberg (FIN)	72.36	72.49	X	72.49 m
9	19	Christophe Épalle (FRA)	67.92	X	69.12	69.12 m
10	20	Vladimír Maška (CZE)	68.63	68.11	68.29	68.63 m
11	22	Fatih Eryildirim (TUR)	X	X	67.54	67.54 m
—	—	Andriy Skvaruk (UKR)	—	—	—	DNS

=== Group B ===
Rank	Overall	Athlete	Attempts			Distance
Rank	Overall	Athlete	1	2	3	Distance
1	1	Olli-Pekka Karjalainen (FIN)	79.00	—	—	79.00 m
2	4	Vadim Devyatovski (BLR)	X	76.86	76.87	76.87 m
3	5	Markus Esser (GER)	73.25	76.67	X	76.67 m
4	7	Primož Kozmus (SLO)	X	74.64	75.90	75.90 m
5	8	Nicola Vizzoni (ITA)	74.31	75.21	74.81	75.21 m
6	10	András Haklits (CRO)	X	74.96	X	74.96 m
7	12	Miloslav Konopka (SVK)	71.98	74.64	X	74.64 m
8	14	Lukáš Melich (CZE)	70.33	73.77	71.90	73.77 m
9	16	Alexandros Papadimitriou (GRE)	71.64	72.94	X	72.94 m
10	18	Eşref Apak (TUR)	70.17	X	X	70.17 m
11	21	Roman Rozna (MDA)	X	68.21	X	68.21 m
—	—	~~Ivan Tsikhan (BLR)~~	~~77.21~~	~~X~~	~~74.40~~	~~77.21 m~~

== Final ==
Rank	Athlete	Attempts						Distance	Note
Rank	Athlete	1	2	3	4	5	6	Distance	Note
1st place, gold medalist(s)	Olli-Pekka Karjalainen (FIN)	78.89	76.86	76.23	80.84	80.60	X	80.84 m	SB
2nd place, silver medalist(s)	Vadim Devyatovski (BLR)	77.44	77.89	78.55	80.76	79.78	75.69	80.76 m	
3rd place, bronze medalist(s)	Markus Esser (GER)	74.53	X	76.79	X	77.75	79.19	79.19 m	
4	Szymon Ziółkowski (POL)	X	78.89	78.97	X	X	74.82	78.97 m	
5	Krisztián Pars (HUN)	38.33	75.60	78.34	X	X	X	78.34 m	
6	Primož Kozmus (SLO)	77.10	78.18	X	76.07	75.49	77.47	78.18 m	
7	Karsten Kobs (GER)	76.32	77.69	X	X	77.84	77.93	77.93 m	
8	Nicola Vizzoni (ITA)	76.55	75.51	76.06				76.55 m	
9	András Haklits (CRO)	X	74.83	X				74.83 m	
10	Marco Lingua (ITA)	X	73.73	73.64				73.73 m	
—	Andrey Vorontsov (BLR)	X	X	X				NM	
—	~~Ivan Tsikhan (BLR)~~	~~76.39~~	~~75.51~~	~~81.11~~	~~78.98~~	~~X~~	~~80.34~~	~~81.11 m~~	DQ

== See also ==
- 2006 Hammer Throw Year Ranking
