= Yosmel Montes =

Cuban hammer thrower

Medal record

Athletics

Representing Cuba

CAC Junior Championships (U20)
Gold medal – first place	1996 San Salvador	Hammer throw

Yosmel Montes (born 26 June 1977) is a Cuban hammer thrower.

== Career ==
Montes won the gold medal at the 2001 Central American and Caribbean Championships. He became Cuban champion in 2000, 2001 and 2004, forming a rivalry with Yosvany Suárez and Erick Jiménez.

Montes achieved his personal best throw of 74.77 metres (245.3 ft) in April 2002 in Havana, beating his previous record, also set in Havana, of 71.77 metres (235.5 ft) in May 2001.

== Personal life ==
Montes and his family defected from Cuba in 2018. His son, Lázaro, is a professional baseball player.

== Achievements ==
Year	Competition	Venue	Position	Event	Notes
Representing Cuba
1994	World Junior Championships	Lisbon, Portugal	7th	Hammer	62.78 m
1996	Central American and Caribbean Junior Championships (U-20)	San Salvador, El Salvador	1st	Hammer	65.88 m
1996	World Junior Championships	Sydney, Australia	6th	Hammer	67.34 m
2001	Central American and Caribbean Championships	Guatemala City, Guatemala	1st	Hammer	69.24 m A
2002	Ibero-American Championships	Guatemala City, Guatemala	2nd	Hammer	69.38 m A
