= Yuriy Bilonoh =

Ukrainian shot putter (born 1974)

Personal information
- Born: March 9, 1974 (age 52) Bilopillia, Sumy Oblast, Ukrainian SSR, Soviet Union
Medal record
Men's Athletics
Representing Ukraine
Olympic Games
Disqualified	2004 Athens	Shot put
World Championships
Bronze medal – third place	2003 Paris	Shot put
World Indoor Championships
Gold medal – first place	1997 Paris	Shot put
Bronze medal – third place	1999 Maebashi	Shot put
Bronze medal – third place	2003 Birmingham	Shot put
European Athletics Championships
Gold medal – first place	2002 Munich	Shot put
Bronze medal – third place	1998 Budapest	Shot put
Summer Universiade
Gold medal – first place	1995 Fukuoka	Shot put
Gold medal – first place	1997 Catania	Shot put
Silver medal – second place	2001 Beijing	Shot put
World Athletics Final
Silver medal – second place	2003 Monte Carlo	Shot put
European Cup
Gold medal – first place	2002 Annecy	Shot put
Bronze medal – third place	1996 Madrid	Shot put
IAAF Grand Prix Final
Silver medal – second place	1998 Moscow	Shot put
Silver medal – second place	2000 Doha	Overall
Silver medal – second place	2002 Paris	Shot put
European Throwing Cup
Gold medal – first place	2007 Yalta	Shot put
Representing Unified Team
World Junior Championships
Gold medal – first place	1992 Seoul	Shot put
Representing Soviet Union
European Youth Olympic Festival
Gold medal – first place	1991 Brussels	Shot put

Yuriy Bilonoh (Ukrainian: Юрій Білоног, also romanized as Yuriy Bilonog; born March 9, 1974) is a Ukrainian shot putter.

== Biography ==
Born in Bilopillia, Sumy Oblast, he began athletics at a Children and Youth Sports School in Bilopillia, where his first trainer was Vladimir Belikov.

Bilonoh was initially awarded a gold medal at the 2004 Olympic Games, but this medal was withdrawn in 2012 as a result of an anti-doping case.

== Achievements ==
Year	Competition	Venue	Position	Notes
Representing Unified Team
1992	World Junior Championships	Seoul, South Korea	1st	18.46 m
Representing Ukraine
1995	World Indoor Championships	Barcelona, Spain	5th	19.74 m
1995	Summer Universiade	Fukuoka, Japan	1st	19.70 m
1997	World Indoor Championships	Paris, France	1st	21.02 m
1997	World Championships	Athens, Greece	4th	20.26 m
1997	Summer Universiade	Catania, Italy	1st	20.34 m
1998	European Championships	Budapest, Hungary	3rd	20.92 m
1998	IAAF Golden League (Grand Prix Final)	Moscow, Russia	2nd	20.62 m
1999	World Indoor Championships	Maebashi, Japan	3rd	20.89 m
1999	World Championships	Seville, Spain	5th	20.60 m
2000	Olympic Games	Sydney, Australia	5th	20.84 m
2000	IAAF Golden League (Grand Prix Final)	Doha, Qatar	4th	20.76 m
2001	World Indoor Championships	Lisbon, Portugal	8th	19.71 m
2001	World Championships	Edmonton, Canada	6th	20.83 m
2001	Summer Universiade	Beijing, China	2nd	20.16 m
2002	European Championships	Munich, Germany	1st	21.37 m
2002	IAAF Golden League (Grand Prix Final)	Paris, France	2nd	20.74 m
2002	IAAF World Cup	Madrid, Spain	5th	19.88 m
2003	World Indoor Championships	Birmingham, United Kingdom	3rd	21.13 m
2003	World Championships	Saint-Denis, France	3rd	21.10 m
2003	IAAF World Athletics Final	Monte Carlo, Monaco	2nd	20.53 m
2004	World Indoor Championships	Budapest, Hungary	8th	20.26 m
2004	Olympic Games	Athens, Greece	DQ (1st)	21.16 m
2004	IAAF World Athletics Final	Monte Carlo, Monaco	DQ (8th)	19.47 m
2005	World Championships	Helsinki, Finland	DQ (4th)	20.89 m
2005	IAAF World Athletics Final	Monte Carlo, Monaco	DQ (6th)	20.04 m
2006	European Cup	Málaga, Spain	DQ (5th)	20.15 m
2006	European Championships	Gothenburg, Sweden	DQ (6th)	20.32 m
2007	European Cup Winter Throwing	Yalta, Ukraine	1st	19.95 m
2008	World Indoor Championships	Valencia, Spain	17th	19.02 m
2008	Olympic Games	Beijing, China	5th	20.63 m
