= 1996 World Junior Championships in Athletics – Men's shot put =

The men's shot put event at the 1996 World Junior Championships in Athletics was held in Sydney, Australia, at International Athletic Centre on 23 and 25 August. A 7257g (Senior implement) shot was used.

== Medalists ==
Gold	Ralf Bartels; Germany
Silver	Justin Anlezark; Australia
Bronze	Clay Cross; Australia

== Results ==
=== Final ===
25 August

Rank	Name	Nationality	Attempts						Result	Notes
Rank	Name	Nationality	1	2	3	4	5	6	Result	Notes
1st place, gold medalist(s)	Ralf Bartels	Germany	16.31	16.61	17.92	x	17.49	18.71	18.71	
2nd place, silver medalist(s)	Justin Anlezark	Australia	17.76	17.47	18.06	18.20	18.21	16.53	18.21	
3rd place, bronze medalist(s)	Clay Cross	Australia	17.51	17.69	15.86	17.09	x	16.72	17.69	
4	Petr Stehlík	Czech Republic	16.84	16.59	17.10	x	17.35	x	17.35	
5	Mikuláš Konopka	Slovakia	17.33	17.09	16.41	x	16.79	16.63	17.33	
6	Ian Waltz	United States	17.21	16.90	17.09	17.29	17.31	x	17.31	
7	Jarkko Haukijärvi	Finland	16.80	16.86	16.96	16.74	17.09	16.92	17.09	
8	Iker Sukía	Spain	16.63	16.77	16.69	16.40	16.45	16.66	16.77	
9	Matthias Wiese	Germany	16.48	x	16.07				16.48	
10	Attila Pintér	Hungary	15.75	15.87	16.14				16.14	
11	Yves Niaré	France	15.44	16.12	x				16.12	
12	Mirosław Dec	Poland	x	15.10	15.74				15.74	

=== Qualifications ===
23 Aug

==== Group A ====
Rank	Name	Nationality	Attempts			Result	Notes
Rank	Name	Nationality	1	2	3	Result	Notes
1	Ralf Bartels	Germany	17.93	-	-	17.93	Q
2	Clay Cross	Australia	16.00	17.75	-	17.75	Q
3	Mikuláš Konopka	Slovakia	16.27	17.35	-	17.35	Q
4	Petr Stehlík	Czech Republic	17.15	-	-	17.15	Q
5	Iker Sukía	Spain	16.83	16.54	x	16.83	q
6	Yves Niaré	France	15.79	16.59	x	16.59	q
7	Váios Tíngas	Greece	16.12	16.20	16.25	16.25	
8	John Davis	United States	15.97	x	15.08	15.97	
9	Jhonny Rodríguez	Colombia	15.90	15.60	15.67	15.90	
10	Igor Tuchak	Russia	15.79	15.85	15.63	15.85	
11	Arpad Sinko	Yugoslavia	15.42	x	15.38	15.42	
12	Carl Myerscough	United Kingdom	x	14.57	x	14.57	

==== Group B ====
Rank	Name	Nationality	Attempts			Result	Notes
Rank	Name	Nationality	1	2	3	Result	Notes
1	Justin Anlezark	Australia	17.43	-	-	17.43	Q
2	Jarkko Haukijärvi	Finland	17.21	-	-	17.21	Q
3	Ian Waltz	United States	17.08	17.08	-	17.08	Q
4	Attila Pintér	Hungary	15.93	16.64	16.84	16.84	q
5	Mirosław Dec	Poland	16.68	16.67	16.20	16.68	q
6	Matthias Wiese	Germany	16.62	15.80	x	16.62	q
7	Miran Vodovnik	Slovenia	16.49	16.26	x	16.49	
8	Yevgeniy Belyakov	Russia	16.16	15.98	16.24	16.24	
9	Marius Vornicu	Romania	16.17	15.94	16.15	16.17	
10	Erwin Simpelaar	Netherlands	15.79	x	16.03	16.03	
11	Charles Winchester	Cook Islands	11.37	x	11.16	11.37	

== Participation ==
According to an unofficial count, 23 athletes from 19 countries participated in the event.

- Australia (2)
- Colombia (1)
- Cook Islands (1)
- Czech Republic (1)
- Finland (1)
- France (1)
- Germany (2)
- Greece (1)
- Hungary (1)
- Netherlands (1)
- Poland (1)
- Romania (1)
- Russia (2)
- Slovakia (1)
- Slovenia (1)
- Spain (1)
- United Kingdom (1)
- United States (2)
- Yugoslavia (1)
