= Ellina Anissimova =

Estonian hammer thrower

Ellina Anissimova (born 7 July 1992) is an Estonian hammer thrower.

Anissimova was born in Narva. On 29 July 2011, she won the Estonian adult national hammer throwing championship. On 16 September 2011, she achieved her personal best throw, 60.23 metres (197.6 ft), an Estonian Junior record.

Her coaches are Sergei Anissimov and Vadim Devyatovskiy.
