= Athletics at the 2002 Commonwealth Games – Men's shot put =

Men's shot put at the Commonwealth Games

The men's shot put event at the 2002 Commonwealth Games was held on 30–31 July.

== Medalists ==
Gold	Silver	Bronze
Justin Anlezark; Australia	Janus Robberts; South Africa	Carl Myerscough; England

== Results ==
=== Qualification ===
Qualification: 18.20 m (Q) or at least 12 best (q) qualified for the final.

Rank	Group	Athlete	Nationality	#1	#2	#3	Result	Notes
1	A	Janus Robberts	South Africa	19.47			19.47	Q
2	A	Justin Anlezark	Australia	19.33			19.33	Q
3	B	Bradley Snyder	Canada	18.73			18.73	Q
4	A	Chima Ugwu	Nigeria	17.63	17.58	18.64	18.64	Q
5	B	Clay Cross	Australia	18.44			18.44	Q
6	B	Carl Myerscough	England	18.36			18.36	Q
7	B	Emeka Udechuku	England	X	17.17	17.92	17.92	q, SB
8	A	Mark Proctor	England	17.10	17.61	x	17.61	q
9	B	Dave Stoute	Trinidad and Tobago	17.47	17.10	x	17.47	q
10	A	Ghufran Hussain	Pakistan	17.29	17.04	17.01	17.29	q
11	B	Lee Newman	Wales	15.75	16.38	16.69	16.69	q
12	A	Dong Enxin	Singapore	15.88	15.79	16.09	16.09	q
13	A	Anthony Soalla-Bell	Sierra Leone	13.90	16.01	16.01	16.01	NR
14	A	Robert Kidd	Belize	11.83	11.69	11.94	11.94	
	B	Navpreet Singh	India	x	x	x	NM	
	B	Kevin Brown	Jamaica				DNS	

=== Final ===
Rank	Athlete	Nationality	#1	#2	#3	#4	#5	#6	Result	Notes
1st place, gold medalist(s)	Justin Anlezark	Australia	18.43	19.94	19.68	20.29	19.70	20.91	20.91	GR
2nd place, silver medalist(s)	Janus Robberts	South Africa	19.03	x	19.35	x	19.97	19.53	19.97	
3rd place, bronze medalist(s)	Carl Myerscough	England	19.82	19.72	19.50	19.47	19.97	19.90	19.91	
4	Bradley Snyder	Canada	18.97	19.26	19.63	x	19.48	x	19.63	
5	Chima Ugwu	Nigeria	18.08	18.33	18.46	18.11	x	18.31	18.46	
6	Clay Cross	Australia	17.45	17.21	18.10	17.72	17.57	17.87	18.10	
7	Mark Proctor	England	17.55	x	x	17.56	17.77	18.08	18.08	
8	Dave Stoute	Trinidad and Tobago	16.91	17.60	x	x	x	–	17.60	
9	Emeka Udechuku	England	17.54	17.38	x				17.54	
10	Ghufran Hussain	Pakistan	16.50	17.40	17.37				17.40	
11	Lee Newman	Wales	16.08	16.23	16.59				16.59	
12	Dong Enxin	Singapore	15.72	15.37	15.65				15.72	
