= Tepa Reinikainen =

Finnish shot putter (born 1976)

Tepa Reinikainen (born 16 March 1976 in Kangasniemi, Southern Savonia) is a Finnish shot putter. His personal best put is 20.88 metres, achieved in July 2001 in Lapinlahti.

Reinikainen was an All-American thrower for the UTEP Miners track and field team, placing 7th in the shot put at the 1999 NCAA Division I Outdoor Track and Field Championships. He began throwing the shot put at 12 years old. At a time, he was the world's number one shot putter in the under-19 age group.

== Achievements ==
Year	Competition	Venue	Position	Notes
Representing Finland
1995	European Junior Championships	Nyíregyháza, Hungary	1st	17.20 m
2000	European Indoor Championships	Ghent, Belgium	6th	19.93 m
2002	European Indoor Championships	Vienna, Austria	10th (q)	19.55 m
2003	World Indoor Championships	Birmingham, United Kingdom	6th	20.59 m
2003	World Championships	Paris, France	6th	20.45 m
2004	Olympic Games	Athens, Greece	12th (q)	19.74 m
2005	World Championships	Helsinki, Finland	8th	20.09 m
