= 2003 IAAF World Indoor Championships – Men's shot put =

CHAMPIONSHIP HELD IN 2003

The men's shot put event at the 2003 IAAF World Indoor Championships was held on 14 March 2003.

The winning margin was 1 cm which as of July 2024 remains the only time the men's shot put was won by less than 8 cm at these championships.

== Medalists ==
Gold	Silver	Bronze
Manuel Martínez; Spain	John Godina; United States	Yuriy Bilonoh; Ukraine

== Results ==
=== Qualification ===
Qualifying performance 20.25 (Q) or 8 best performers (q) advanced to the Final.

Rank	Athlete	Nationality	#1	#2	#3	Result	Notes
1	John Godina	United States	20.88			20.88	Q, SB
2	Yuriy Bilonoh	Ukraine	20.55			20.55	Q
3	Joachim Olsen	Denmark	X	20.13	20.45	20.45	Q, SB
4	Manuel Martínez	Spain	20.13	20.36		20.36	Q, SB
5	Justin Anlezark	Australia	X	20.25		20.25	Q
6	Tepa Reinikainen	Finland	20.24	20.04	20.12	20.24	q
7	Arsi Harju	Finland	20.19	X	X	20.19	q
8	Milan Haborák	Slovakia	X	19.95	–	19.95	q
9	Pavel Chumachenko	Russia	19.71	X	X	19.71	
10	Rutger Smith	Netherlands	19.06	19.59	X	19.59	
11	Kevin Toth	United States	X	X	19.35	19.35	
12	Ralf Bartels	Germany	19.32	19.15	X	19.32	
	Paolo Dal Soglio	Italy	X	X	X	NM	
	Gheorghe Guset	Romania				NM	

=== Final ===
Rank	Athlete	Nationality	#1	#2	#3	#4	#5	#6	Result	Notes
1st place, gold medalist(s)	Manuel Martínez	Spain	20.73	21.14	21.07	21.01	20.70	21.24	21.24	SB
2nd place, silver medalist(s)	John Godina	United States	X	X	21.23	X	X	20.66	21.23	SB
3rd place, bronze medalist(s)	Yuriy Bilonoh	Ukraine	21.13	20.92	21.07	X	20.83	X	21.13	
4	Arsi Harju	Finland	X	20.64	20.71	20.96	20.90	X	20.96	
5	Justin Anlezark	Australia	20.04	X	20.65	20.03	X	19.91	20.65	
6	Tepa Reinikainen	Finland	20.13	20.44	20.53	20.52	X	20.59	20.59	
7	Milan Haborák	Slovakia	19.67	20.04	20.08	X	X	20.21	20.21	
8	Joachim Olsen	Denmark	20.12	X	X	X	X	19.93	20.12	
