= Maciej Pałyszko =

Polish hammer thrower

Maciej Pałyszko (born 2 January 1978 in Warsaw, Mazowieckie) is a retired male hammer thrower from Poland. He set his personal best (80.89 metres) on 13 July 2003 in Bydgoszcz.

== Achievements ==
Year	Competition	Venue	Position	Notes
1994	World Junior Championships	Lisbon, Portugal	10th	61.28 m
1995	European Junior Championships	Nyíregyháza, Hungary	5th	67.44 m
1996	World Junior Championships	Sydney, Australia	1st	71.24 m
1997	European Junior Championships	Ljubljana, Slovenia	1st	74.12 m
1997	World Championships	Athens, Greece	28th	71.54 m
1998	European Championships	Budapest, Hungary	29th	72.03 m
1999	European U23 Championships	Gothenburg, Sweden	3rd	73.50 m
1999	World Championships	Seville, Spain	29th	72.05 m
2000	Olympic Games	Sydney, Australia	13th	76.33 m
2001	World Championships	Edmonton, Canada	11th	75.94 m
2002	European Championships	Munich, Germany	22nd	75.51 m
2003	World Championships	Paris, France	18th	75.42 m
