= Vadim Devyatovskiy =

Belarusian hammer thrower

Vadim Devyatovsky
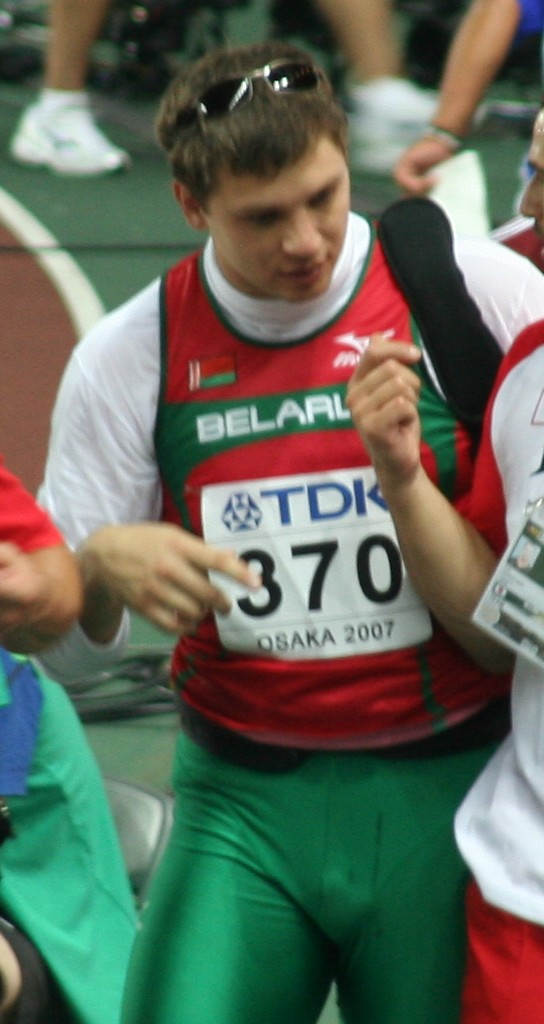
- Vadim Devyatovsky at the 2007 World Championships in Osaka

Personal information
- Native name: Вадзім Анатолевіч Дзевяоўскі
- Full name: Vadim Anatolyevich Devyatovsky
- Born: 20 March 1977 (age 49) Navapolatsk, Byelorussian SSR, Soviet Union (today Belarus)
- Height: 1.92 m (6 ft 4 in)
- Weight: 115 kg (254 lb)

Sport
- Sport: Athletics
- Event: Hammer throw
- Club: Dynamo Vitebsk

Achievements and titles
- Personal best: 84.90 m (2005)
Medal record
Men's Athletics
Representing Belarus
Olympic Games
Silver medal – second place	2008 Beijing	Hammer
World Championships
Gold medal – first place	2005 Helsinki	Hammer
European Championships
Silver medal – second place	2006 Gothenburg	Hammer
Universiade
Gold medal – first place	2005 İzmir	Hammer

Vadim Anatolyevich Devyatovsky (Belarusian: Вадзім Анатольевіч Дзевятоўскі, Vadzim Anatoljevič Dzieviatoŭski, Russian: Вади́м Анато́льевич Девято́вский; born 20 March 1977 in Navapołacak, Belarusian SSR, USSR) is a Belarusian hammer thrower.

He finished fourth at the 2004 Summer Olympics, and in 2005 he won the World Championships after his countryman Ivan Tsikhan was stripped of his gold medal because of doping violations. In July the same year he threw 84.90 metres, which currently is his personal best. He originally won a silver medal at the 2008 Summer Olympics, but was later taken away for doping, but reinstated afterwards.

Since 2008 he is a coach of Estonian hammer thrower Ellina Anissimova.

On 21 August 2020, during the 2020–21 Belarusian protests against the government of Alexander Lukashenko, Devyatovsky posted a message on his Facebook page in which he stated that "Lukashenko is not my President!!!!!" and stated that his previous support for the regime was a "delusion" and "betrayal of myself".

== Doping allegations ==
He was suspended from the sport for doping violations from 18 September 2000 to 17 September 2002.

On 4 September 2008 it was reported that Devyatovsky and the bronze medalist from the Olympics, fellow Belarusian Ivan Tsikhan, were under investigation by the International Olympic Committee for doping offenses. In December 2008, the IOC found him guilty of doping and took away his medal. He appealed the IOC's findings to the Court of Arbitration for Sport.

In June 2010 CAS ruled that the Beijing National Laboratory, which carried out the tests, had violated "documentation and reporting requirements" and granted his appeal for the reinstatement of the original competition results and the medal to be returned. It said the decision "should not be interpreted as an exoneration of the athletes," and the court did not say the athletes are free of any doping suspicion. CAS said the lab had provided no "plausible explanation" for interruption of the automated testing procedure of the IRMS—isotope ratio mass spectrometry—instruments and the lab breached international standards by having the same analyst test both the "A" and "B" samples. CAS further elaborated that the departure from these international standards "justify the annulment of the tests' results for both athletes".

== Achievements ==
Year	Competition	Venue	Position	Notes
Representing Belarus
1994	World Junior Championships	Lisbon, Portugal	5th	64.70 m
1996	World Junior Championships	Sydney, Australia	2nd	70.88 m
1999	European U23 Championships	Gothenburg, Sweden	4th	73.34 m
2003	World Championships	Paris, France	7th	78.13 m
2004	Olympic Games	Athens, Greece	4th	78.82 m
2004	World Athletics Final	Szombathely, Hungary	5th	76.54 m
2005	World Athletics Final	Szombathely, Hungary	2nd	78.98 m
2006	European Championships	Gothenburg, Sweden	2nd	80.76 m
2006	World Athletics Final	Stuttgart, Germany	5th	78.67 m
2007	World Championships	Osaka, Japan	4th	81.57 m
2007	World Athletics Final	Stuttgart, Germany	5th	77.81 m
2008	Olympic Games	Beijing, China	2nd	81.61 m
