= Pavel Chumachenko =

Russian shot putter

Pavel Leonidivuch Chumachenko (Cyrillic: Павел Леонидович Чумаченко; born 5 April 1971 in Bratsk) is a Russian shot putter.

His personal best is 20.54 metres, achieved in June 2001 in Bremen. He has an indoor personal best of 20.91 metres.

== International competitions ==
Year	Competition	Venue	Position	Notes
Representing Russia
1997	World Indoor Championships	Paris, France	18th (q)	18.88 m
1998	European Indoor Championships	Valencia, Spain	8th	19.68 m
1998	Goodwill Games	Uniondale, United States	8th	17.53 m
1999	World Indoor Championships	Maebashi, Japan	7th	19.82 m
2000	Olympic Games	Sydney, Australia	18th (q)	19.40 m
2001	World Indoor Championships	Lisbon, Portugal	10th	19.66 m
2001	World Championships	Edmonton, Canada	18th (q)	19.35 m
2001	Goodwill Games	Brisbane, Australia	8th	19.34 m
2002	European Indoor Championships	Vienna, Austria	3rd	20.30 m
2003	World Indoor Championships	Birmingham, United Kingdom	9th (q)	19.71 m
2003	World Championships	Paris, France	19th (q)	19.51 m
2004	Olympic Games	Athens, Greece	22nd (q)	19.38 m
