= 1994 World Junior Championships in Athletics – Men's hammer throw =

The men's hammer throw event at the 1994 World Junior Championships in Athletics was held in Lisbon, Portugal, at Estádio Universitário de Lisboa on 22 and 23 July. A 7257g (senior implement) hammer was used.

== Medalists ==
Gold	Szymon Ziółkowski; Poland
Silver	Igor Tugay; Ukraine
Bronze	Sergey Vasilyev; Russia

== Results ==
=== Final ===
23 July

Rank	Name	Nationality	Attempts						Result	Notes
Rank	Name	Nationality	1	2	3	4	5	6	Result	Notes
1st place, gold medalist(s)	Szymon Ziółkowski	Poland	70.44	x	70.42	x	69.50	x	70.44	
2nd place, silver medalist(s)	Igor Tugay	Ukraine	66.96	68.84	x	69.92	x	70.08	70.08	
3rd place, bronze medalist(s)	Sergey Vasilyev	Russia	65.90	66.14	x	65.42	64.60	65.98	66.14	
4	Tapio Kolunsarka	Finland	65.08	61.88	62.02	x	x	64.56	65.08	
5	Vadim Devyatovskiy	Belarus	x	63.34	62.14	60.66	64.70	x	64.70	
6	Norbert Horváth	Hungary	63.60	63.36	x	62.50	63.60	62.58	63.60	
7	Yosmel Montes	Cuba	59.70	62.78	61.40	60.42	x	x	62.78	
8	Steve Harnapp	Germany							62.22	
9	Karl Andrews	United Kingdom	61.64	62.14	x				62.14	
10	Maciej Pałyszko	Poland	61.28	x	60.84				61.28	
	Kalle Lehmusvuori	Finland							DNS	
	Vladislav Piskunov	Ukraine	68.54	69.26	70.02	71.66	70.80	71.48	DQ	IAAF rule 32.2

=== Qualifications ===
22 Jul

==== Group A ====
Rank	Name	Nationality	Attempts			Result	Notes
Rank	Name	Nationality	1	2	3	Result	Notes
1	Karl Andrews	United Kingdom	59.04	x	62.82	62.82	q
2	Norbert Horváth	Hungary	x	60.88	61.36	61.36	q
3	Steve Harnapp	Germany	x	61.00	61.04	61.04	q
4	Maciej Pałyszko	Poland	x	60.64	60.94	60.94	q
5	Kalle Lehmusvuori	Finland	x	60.60	59.74	60.60	q
6	Konstantin Balandin	Russia	x	59.34	59.98	59.98	
7	Wes Boudreau	Canada	57.18	59.94	56.08	59.94	
8	Bjarne Brøns	Denmark	55.72	x	57.62	57.62	
9	Anscar Salgado	Spain	x	57.00	x	57.00	
10	Xavier Tison	France	55.58	55.62	56.02	56.02	
11	Adam Connolly	United States	54.76	52.02	52.76	54.76	
12	Enton Dervishi	Albania	54.64	53.40	52.26	54.64	
	Aleksandr Kukharenko	Belarus	x	x	x	NM	
	Vladislav Piskunov	Ukraine	69.24	-	-	DQ	IAAF rule 32.2 Q

==== Group B ====
Rank	Name	Nationality	Attempts			Result	Notes
Rank	Name	Nationality	1	2	3	Result	Notes
1	Szymon Ziółkowski	Poland	69.00	-	-	69.00	Q
2	Igor Tugay	Ukraine	66.68	-	-	66.68	Q
3	Sergey Vasilyev	Russia	66.26	-	-	66.26	Q
4	Tapio Kolunsarka	Finland	64.40	-	-	64.40	Q
5	Vadim Devyatovskiy	Belarus	62.00	x	63.60	63.00	q
6	Yosmel Montes	Cuba	x	x	60.98	60.98	q
7	Juan Cerra	Argentina	56.38	60.44	x	60.44	
8	Cosmin Sorescu	Romania	58.28	x	59.22	59.22	
9	Sean McGehearty	United States	57.32	57.92	58.38	58.38	
10	Róbert Fazekas	Hungary	x	55.98	57.74	57.74	
11	Juan Barbosa	Spain	55.88	55.14	x	55.88	
12	Sergey Bakalear	Moldova	x	x	55.76	55.76	
13	Norman Leide	Germany	51.10	x	x	51.10	
	Mohamed Karim Horchani	Tunisia	x	x	x	NM	

== Participation ==
According to an unofficial count, 28 athletes from 19 countries participated in the event.

- Albania (1)
- Argentina (1)
- Belarus (2)
- Canada (1)
- Cuba (1)
- Denmark (1)
- Finland (2)
- France (1)
- Germany (2)
- Hungary (2)
- Moldova (1)
- Poland (2)
- Romania (1)
- Russia (2)
- Spain (2)
- Tunisia (1)
- Ukraine (2)
- United Kingdom (1)
- United States (2)
