= Patric Suter =

Swiss hammer thrower

Patric Suter (born 17 May 1977) is a retired male hammer thrower from Switzerland. His personal best is 80.51 metres, achieved in September 2003 in Löffingen, is the current Swiss record. Suter is also a five time national champion. In December 2007, Suter officially retired from athletics after a dispute with the national governing body. A member of the Hochwacht Zug club, Suter trained under the guidance of Vasiliy Sidorenko.

== International competitions ==
Year	Competition	Venue	Position	Notes
Representing Switzerland
1996	World Junior Championships	Sydney, Australia	23rd (q)	56.36 m
1999	European U23 Championships	Gothenburg, Sweden	8th	70.18 m
2004	Olympic Games	Athens, Greece	23rd (q)	73.54 m
2005	World Championships	Helsinki, Finland	26th (q)	68.54 m

== Double murder ==
In 2009, Suter was arrested for murdering a married couple and sentenced to life in prison.
