= James Parker (hammer thrower) =

American hammer thrower (1975–2023)

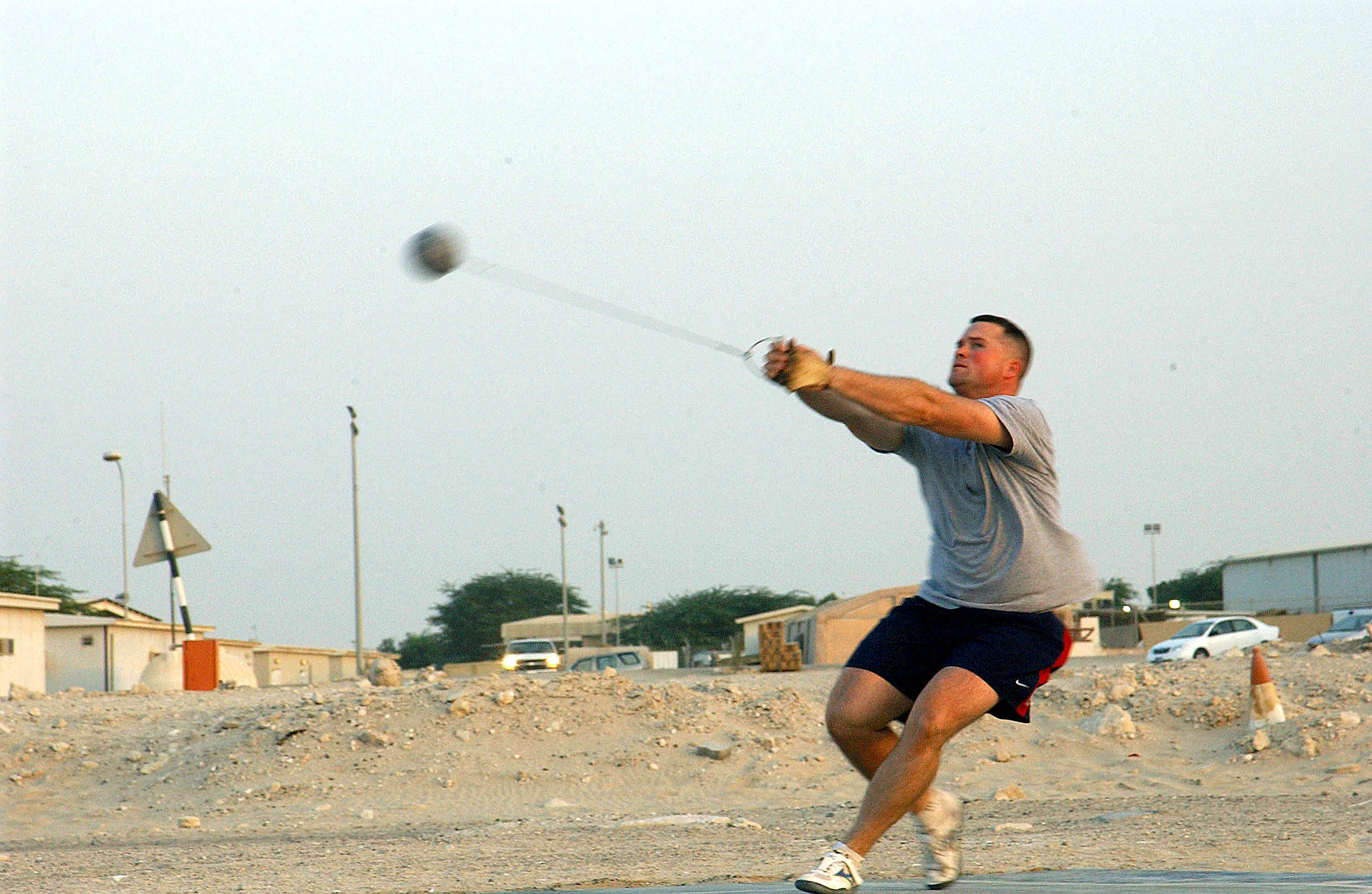

Personal information
- Full name: James Daniel Parker
- Born: December 3, 1975 Biloxi, Mississippi, U.S.
- Died: August 19, 2023 (aged 47) Huntsville, Utah, U.S.
- Height: 6 ft 0 in (183 cm)
- Weight: 245 lb (111 kg)
Medal record
Men's athletics
Representing United States
Pan American Games
Silver medal – second place	2003 Santo Domingo	Hammer throw

James Daniel Parker (December 3, 1975 – August 19, 2023) was an American track and field athlete who specialized in the hammer throw. He represented the United States at the 2004 Summer Olympics. He won the silver medal at the 2003 Pan American Games.

== Life and career ==
James D. Parker was born in Biloxi, Mississippi, on December 3, 1975. Parker grew up in Layton, Utah. At Layton's Northridge High School, Parker was a track and football athlete. He won the state championship in shot put his junior and senior year, and the discus as a senior. He graduated in 1994.

=== Utah State ===
For university, he joined the Utah State University athletics team where he would earn All-American track honors nine times. At Utah State, Parker competed in hammer throw and discus. In 2001, Parker graduated from Utah State in with degrees in exercise science and human biology.

=== Air Force and Olympics ===
After university, Parker would go on to join the U.S. Air Force, serving as first lieutenant and continuing his athletic career as part of the World Class Athlete Program. In 2004, he set a personal best in the hammer throw with a throw of 79.20 meters (259 feet 10 inches), qualifying him for the Olympics. That year, he was named Air Force Athlete of the Year. At the 2004 Summer Olympics, Parker caught a stomach ailment and failed to make it out of qualifying.

Parker would later rise to become deputy commander of the 380th Expeditionary Services Squadron. He was unsuccessful in his attempt to qualify for the 2008 Summer Olympics.

=== Chiropractic career ===
After leaving the military, Parker attended the University of Western States in Portland, Oregon, earning a doctorate in chiropractic practice. In 2011, he opened a private practice in Davis County, Utah.

In 2012, Parker was inducted into the Utah State University Athletics Hall of Fame. At the time, he was the most decorated athlete in Utah State's history.

Parker later coached Paralympian David Blair to a gold medal in the 2016 Summer Paralympics in Rio. Parker would later join the medical team for Team USA, travelling to Tokyo in 2021 as a chiropractor for the 2020 Summer Games and 2020 Paralympic Games.

=== Death ===
Parker died on August 19, 2023, at age 47 from a heart attack while hiking near Huntsville, Utah.

== Competition record ==
Year	Competition	Venue	Position	Event	Notes
Representing the United States
2001	Universiade	Beijing, China	–	Hammer throw	NM
2003	Pan American Games	Santo Domingo, Dominican Republic	2nd	Hammer throw	74.35 m
2004	Olympic Games	Athens, Greece	21st (q)	Hammer throw	75.04 m
2005	World Championships	Helsinki, Finland	20th (q)	Hammer throw	71.95 m
