= Athletics at the 1997 Summer Universiade – Men's shot put =

The men's shot put event at the 1997 Summer Universiade was held at the Stadio Cibali in Catania, Italy on 30 August.

== Medalists ==
Gold	Silver	Bronze
Yuriy Bilonoh; Ukraine	Paolo Dal Soglio; Italy	Brian Miller; United States

== Results ==
=== Qualification ===
Rank	Group	Athlete	Nationality	Result	Notes
1	B	Miroslav Menc	Czech Republic	19.89	Q
2	?	Cor Booysen	South Africa	18.89	Q
3	?	Yuriy Bilonoh	Ukraine	18.85	Q
4	?	Bradley Snyder	Canada	18.81	Q
5	?	Viktor Bulat	Belarus	18.51	Q
6	?	Przemysław Zabawski	Poland	18.42	Q
7	?	Paolo Dal Soglio	Italy	18.38	Q
8	A	Manuel Martínez	Spain	18.33	Q
9	?	Andrei Mikhnevich	Belarus	18.25	Q
10	?	Stevimir Ercegovac	Croatia	18.24	Q
11	?	Yuriy Parhomenko	Ukraine	18.23	Q
12	?	Brian Miller	United States	18.14	Q
13	?	Ole Hertel	Germany	18.09	Q
13	?	Brad Mears	United States	18.09	Q
15	?	Nerijus Kuzinkovas	Lithuania	18.00	Q
16	?	Jaan Talts	Estonia	17.12	
17	?	Roman Rozna	Moldova	16.55	
18	?	Ivan Emilianov	Moldova	16.23	
19	?	Marco Verni	Chile	15.74	
20	?	Mark Edwards	Great Britain	15.72	
21	?	Tarek Al-Najjar	Jordan	15.58	
22	?	José Rosario	Puerto Rico	15.57	

=== Final ===
Rank	Athlete	Nationality	Result	Notes
1st place, gold medalist(s)	Yuriy Bilonoh	Ukraine	20.34	
2nd place, silver medalist(s)	Paolo Dal Soglio	Italy	20.01	
3rd place, bronze medalist(s)	Brian Miller	United States	19.72	
4	Brad Mears	United States	19.57	
5	Miroslav Menc	Czech Republic	19.53	
6	Andrei Mikhnevich	Belarus	19.22	
7	Manuel Martínez	Spain	19.05	
8	Przemysław Zabawski	Poland	18.53	
9	Yuriy Parhomenko	Ukraine	18.53	
10	Ole Hertel	Germany	18.49	
11	Cor Booysen	South Africa	18.36	
12	Viktor Bulat	Belarus	18.31	
13	Nerijus Kuzinkovas	Lithuania	18.19	
14	Stevimir Ercegovac	Croatia	18.10	
15	Bradley Snyder	Canada	16.99	
