= 1999 IAAF World Indoor Championships – Men's shot put =

The men's shot put event at the 1999 IAAF World Indoor Championships was held on March 5.

== Results ==
Rank	Athlete	Nationality	#1	#2	#3	#4	#5	#6	Result	Notes
1st place, gold medalist(s)	Oleksandr Bagach	Ukraine	20.78	21.18	21.10	20.91	21.41	x	21.41	
2nd place, silver medalist(s)	John Godina	United States	20.68	20.68	x	20.31	20.28	21.06	21.06	SB
3rd place, bronze medalist(s)	Yuriy Bilonoh	Ukraine	20.24	20.89	20.43	20.35	20.21	20.74	20.89	SB
4	Manuel Martínez	Spain	20.53	x	19.73	20.20	x	20.79	20.79	NR
5	Arsi Harju	Finland	19.03	19.01	20.38	x	x	19.66	20.38	
6	Paolo Dal Soglio	Italy	20.10	19.92	20.00	x	19.94	19.88	20.10	
7	Pavel Chumachenko	Russia	19.27	19.64	x	19.61	19.82	19.70	19.82	
8	Andrei Mikhnevich	Belarus	19.30	x	x	19.44	18.95	x	19.44	
9	Andy Bloom	United States	x	18.76	18.74				18.76	
10	Yuji Okano	Japan	16.44	16.72	16.68				16.72	
