= Athletics at the 1998 Commonwealth Games – Men's shot put =

Men's shot put at the Commonwealth Games

The men's shot put event at the 1998 Commonwealth Games was held on 21 September in Kuala Lumpur.

== Results ==
Rank	Name	Nationality	Result	Notes
1st place, gold medalist(s)	Burger Lambrechts	South Africa	20.01	
2nd place, silver medalist(s)	Mihalis Louca	Cyprus	19.52	
3rd place, bronze medalist(s)	Shaun Pickering	Wales	19.33	
4	Clay Cross	Australia	19.16	
5	Janus Robberts	South Africa	19.15	
6	Aaron Neighbour	Australia	18.77	
7	Justin Anlezark	Australia	18.44	
8	Ian Winchester	New Zealand	18.35	
9	Stephan Hayward	Scotland	16.89	
10	Mark Proctor	England	16.78	
11	Jason Tunks	Canada	16.73	
12	Mark Edwards	England	16.59	
13	Ghufran Hussain	Pakistan	16.34	
14	Anthony Soalla-Bell	Sierra Leone	14.87	
