= Ihor Tuhay =

Ukrainian hammer thrower

Medal record
Men's athletics
Representing Ukraine
World Junior Championships
Silver medal – second place	1994 Lisbon	Hammer throw

Ihor Ivanovych Tuhay (Ukrainian: Ігор Іванович Тугай; born 22 March 1975) is a hammer thrower from Ukraine. His personal best throw is 79.46 metres, achieved in July 2008 in Kyiv.

== Achievements ==
Year	Competition	Venue	Position	Notes
Representing Ukraine
1994	World Junior Championships	Lisbon, Portugal	2nd	70.08 m
1997	European U23 Championships	Turku, Finland	7th	68.96 m
2005	World Championships	Helsinki, Finland	23rd (q)	70.85 m
2008	Olympic Games	Beijing, PR China	24th (q)	71.89 m
