= Athletics at the 1995 Summer Universiade – Men's shot put =

The men's shot put event at the 1995 Summer Universiade was held on 30–31 August at the Hakatanomori Athletic Stadium in Fukuoka, Japan.

== Medalists ==
Gold	Silver	Bronze
Yuriy Bilonoh; Ukraine	Viktor Bulat; Belarus	Thorsten Herbrand; Germany

== Results ==
=== Qualification ===
Qualification: 18.00 m (Q) or at least 12 best (q) qualified for the final.

Rank	Group	Athlete	Nationality	#1	#2	#3	Result	Notes
1	A	Thorsten Herbrand	Germany	18.84			18.84	Q
2	A	Yuriy Bilonoh	Ukraine	18.46			18.46	Q
3	B	Corrado Fantini	Italy	18.29			18.29	Q
4	A	Scott Petersen	United States	18.26			18.26	Q
5	B	Miroslav Menc	Czech Republic	18.19			18.19	Q
6	B	Viktor Bulat	Belarus	18.17			18.17	Q
7	B	Konstantinos Kollias	Greece	17.53	17.70	18.11	18.11	Q
8	B	John Gorddard	Australia	16.66	18.06		18.06	Q
9	B	Peter Kaligis	United States	18.06			18.06	Q
10	A	Andries Booysen	South Africa	17.76	17.40	17.63	17.76	q
11	A	Marc Sandmeier	Switzerland	17.11	x	17.65	17.65	q
12	A	Jakob Vujčić	Australia	16.04	16.59	16.37	16.59	q
13	A	Kenji Tanaka	Japan	x	16.57	x	16.57	
14	B	Yoshinori Nogawa	Japan	15.69	x	15.21	15.69	
15	A	Dean Bertoia	Canada	14.41	14.60	14.64	14.64	
16	A	Tareq Al-Najjar	Jordan	14.20	13.40	13.29	14.20	
17	A	Daniel Duarte	Peru	x	13.42	13.81	13.81	
18	B	Sylvanus Gwiboha	Tanzania	10.31	9.70	9.82	10.31	
	A	Chima Ugkiu	Nigeria				DNS	
	B	Nerijus Kuzinkovas	Lithuania				DNS	
	B	Ziad Chahwan	Lebanon				DNS	

=== Final ===
Rank	Athlete	Nationality	#1	#2	#3	#4	#5	#6	Result	Notes
1st place, gold medalist(s)	Yuriy Bilonoh	Ukraine	19.43	19.70	x	x	x	x	19.70	
2nd place, silver medalist(s)	Viktor Bulat	Belarus	17.76	19.40	x	x	x	19.69	19.69	
3rd place, bronze medalist(s)	Thorsten Herbrand	Germany	18.70	18.88	18.22	x	x	18.32	18.88	
4	Miroslav Menc	Czech Republic	18.73	18.82	18.65	18.47	18.58	18.61	18.82	
5	Peter Kaligis	United States	17.85	x	18.18	x	18.52	x	18.52	
6	Andries Booysen	South Africa	17.40	17.77	17.46	18.09	17.88	18.45	18.45	
7	Konstantinos Kollias	Greece	17.10	17.71	18.11	x	x	x	18.11	
8	John Gorddard	Australia	16.91	17.84	x	x	17.63	17.87	17.87	
9	Corrado Fantini	Italy	17.65	x	17.56				17.65	
10	Scott Petersen	United States	x	x	17.57				17.57	
11	Marc Sandmeier	Switzerland	17.23	17.46	17.47				17.47	
12	Jakob Vujčić	Australia	15.97	16.06	x				16.06	
