= Conny Karlsson (shot putter) =

Finnish shot putter (born 1975)

Personal information
- Born: 30 December 1975 (age 50) Dragsfjärd
- Height: 195 cm (6 ft 5 in)
- Weight: 124 kg (273 lb)

Achievements and titles
- Personal best: 20.78 m
Medal record
1997 European Athletics U23 Championships
Gold medal – first place	Men's shotput	19.48 m
2022 World Masters Athletics Championships
Bronze medal – third place	Men's shotput, age 45	15.05 m
Finnish Athletics Championships
Men's shotput
Bronze medal – third place	1996	18.29 m
Gold medal – first place	2001	20.49 m
Gold medal – first place	2002	20.34 m
Bronze medal – third place	2003	19.54 m
Silver medal – second place	2004	19.39 m
Bronze medal – third place	2005	20.13 m
Gold medal – first place	2006	19.45 m
Bronze medal – third place	2011	17.89 m
Finnish Indoor Athletics Championships
Men's shotput
Bronze medal – third place	1999	18.79 m
Silver medal – second place	2001	19.93 m
Gold medal – first place	2005	19.47 m
Silver medal – second place	2007	19.75 m
Gold medal – first place	2007	17.65 m
SAUL Finnish Championships
Men's shotput, age 40
Gold medal – first place	2017	16.17 m
Gold medal – first place	2019	15.20 m
Men's shotput, age 50
Gold medal – first place	2026	17.42 m
2026 Finlands svenska idrott
Second place	Men's shotput	15.84 m
- Updated on 30 September 2026

Conny Karlsson (born 30 December 1975 in Dragsfjärd, Finland) is a 195-cm tall former Finnish shot putter, who competed for Pargas IF and IF Raseborg. His personal best in the men's shot put currently stands at 20.78 m, which he put on 4 August 2001 in the World Championships in Edmonton, Canada. He was coached by Robert Malmberg.

Karlsson has eight medals from the Finnish Outdoor Championships, three of which are gold. In 2006, he placed second in the Finnish Championships, but was later on awarded the gold medal when the winner, Ville Tiisanoja, was caught doping and stripped of his gold medal. Karlsson also has five medals from the Finnish Indoor Athletics Championships, two of which are gold.

Karlsson was the eighteenth member to be inducted into the 20 meter club after he successfully putted the shot 20.45 m in a competition on 31 May 2001 in Espoo, Finland.

Karlsson's health began to decline in 2003. He had to end his career in April 2007 due to colitis ulcerosa. He returned to the sport several times since, beginning in 2009. In the 2017 Finnish Athletics Championships at Seinäjoki, he placed fifth with a distance of 17.02 m, while placing first in the Finnish men's shotput for 40-year-olds at Lohja with 16.17 m. Karlsson also placed first in the 2019 SAUL at Turku with a distance of 15.20 m.

At the 2022 World Masters Athletics Championships, he placed third in the men's shotput for 45-year-olds with a distance of 15.05 m. In 2026, he won second place in the Finlands svenska idrott championship competition in Pedersöre with a distance of 15.84 m. Karlsson also won gold and set a new record for the Finnish men's shotput for 50-year-olds with 17.42 m in the SAUL Finnish Championships at Turku in 2026.

== Personal life and education ==
Karlsson attended the Tammisaari University of Applied Sciences in the BBA program.

He is married with two children, living in Ekenäs.

== Achievements ==
International competitions
Representing Finland
Year	Competition	Venue	Position	Distance	Ref.
1994	World Junior Championships	Lisbon, Portugal	6th	17.08 m	
1997	European U23 Championships	Turku, Finland	1st	19.48 m	
1999	Universiade	Palma de Mallorca, Spain	5th	19.11 m	
2001	World Championships	Edmonton, Canada	7th	20.78 m	
2002	European Indoor Championships	Vienna, Austria	12th (q)	19.49 m	
2002	European Championships	Munich, Germany	14th (q)	19.66 m	
2003	World Championships	Paris, France	24th (q)	19.17 m	
2005	European Indoor Championships	Madrid, Spain	15th (q)	19.32 m	
2006	European Championships	Gothenburg, Sweden	17th	19.18 m	
2007	European Indoor Championships	Birmingham, United Kingdom	5th	20.09 m	
2022	World Masters Athletics Championships	Tampere, Finland	3rd	15.05 m	

Finnish Athletics Championships
Year	Venue	Position	Distance	Ref.
1996	Tampere	3rd	18.29 m	
2001	Turku	1st	20.49 m	
2002	Joensuu	1st	20.34 m	
2003	Helsinki	3rd	19.54 m	
2004	Vaasa	2nd	19.39 m	
2005	Pori	3rd	20.13 m	
2006	Jyväskylä	1st	19.45 m	
2011	Turku	3rd	17.89 m	

Finnish Indoor Athletics Championships
Year	Venue	Position	Distance	Ref.
1999	Jyväskylä	3rd	18.79 m	
2001	Oulu	2nd	19.93 m	
2005	Turku	1st	19.47 m	
2007	Rovaniemi	2nd	19.75 m	
2010	Turku	1st	17.65 m	
