= Paul Cross (rugby league) =

Australian rugby league footballer (born 1945)

Personal information
- Born: 15 August 1945 (age 81) Sydney, New South Wales, Australia

Playing information
- Position: Wing
Club
Years	Team	Pld	T	G	FG	P
1964–65	Eastern Suburbs	18	9	0	0	27
1966–74	Balmain Tigers	94	50	0	0	150
	Total	112	59	0	0	177
- Relatives: Ryan Cross (son); Clay Cross (son)

Paul Cross (Sydney) is an Australian former rugby league footballer who played in the 1960s and 1970s. He played in the New South Wales Rugby League premiership for Eastern Suburbs and Balmain Tigers, and in 1968 in the Canberra Rugby League for Queanbeyan Blues.

== Club career ==
An East's junior, Paul Cross began his first grade career at Eastern Suburbs, playing two season with them in 1964 and 1965.

He joined the Balmain Tigers in 1966 and played in the losing grand final team of that year. He played eight seasons at the Balmian Tigers, although he had one year at Queanbeyan in 1968. He returned to Balmain in 1969 (although he was not selected to play in the winning 1969 Grand Final team) and stayed at the club until he retired in 1974. He scored a club record 4 tries in a match against Canterbury-Bankstown in 1969.

A flamboyant winger, Cross was the NSWRFL season 1971 top try-scorer with 18 tries.

Paul Cross is the father of the rugby league, and rugby union footballer; Ryan Cross, and the Commonwealth Games athlete and four-time Australian shot put champion Clay Cross.
