= Sergey Kirmasov =

Russian hammer thrower

Sergey Stanislavovich Kirmasov (Сергей Станиславович Кирмасов; born 25 March 1970 in Mtsensk, Oryol) is a retired male hammer thrower from Russia. His personal best is 82.62 metres, achieved in May 1998 in Bryansk.

== International competitions ==
Year	Competition	Venue	Position	Notes
Representing Soviet Union
1989	European Junior Championships	Varaždin, Yugoslavia	1st	72.68 m
Representing Russia
1998	European Championships	Budapest, Hungary	18th	74.50 m
2001	World Military Championships	Zagreb, Croatia	3rd	77.02 m
2001	World Championships	Edmonton, Canada	15th	75.79 m
2003	World Championships	Paris, France	20th	74.17 m
2004	Olympic Games	Athens, Greece	16th	75.83 m
2005	World Championships	Helsinki, Finland	—	NM
