= Dorian Çollaku =

Albanian hammer thrower (born 1977)

Personal information
- Nationality: Albania
- Born: 2 June 1977 (age 49) Tirana, Albania
- Height: 1.83 m (6 ft 0 in)
- Weight: 96 kg (212 lb)

Sport
- Sport: Athletics
- Event: Hammer throw
- Club: Espoon Tapiot (FIN)

Achievements and titles
- Personal best: Hammer throw: 76.96 m (2008)

Dorian Çollaku (born 2 June 1977) is an Albanian hammer thrower.

Çollaku was born in Tirana. He competed at the 2004 Summer Olympics. He was placed thirty-first in the qualifying rounds of the competition, with a throw of 70.06 metres. At the 2008 Summer Olympics in Beijing, he successfully threw the hammer into the field on his third and final attempt, at 70.98 metres. Collaku, however, failed to advance into the hammer throw final, as he placed twenty-eighth overall in the qualifying rounds.

== Competition record ==
Year	Competition	Venue	Position	Event	Notes
Representing Albania
1996	World Junior Championships	Sydney, Australia	17th (q)	Hammer	59.72 m
1997	European U23 Championships	Turku, Finland	16th (q)	Hammer	63.06 m
1999	European U23 Championships	Gothenburg, Sweden	10th	Hammer	68.58 m
2002	European Championships	Munich, Germany	30th (q)	Hammer throw	67.47
2004	Olympic Games	Athens, Greece	31st (q)	Hammer throw	70.06
2005	European Cup Winter Throwing	Mersin, Turkey	1st (c)	Hammer throw	72.17
2005	World Championships	Helsinki, Finland	28th (q)	Hammer throw	58.83
2007	World Championships	Osaka, Japan	27th (q)	Hammer throw	66.63
2008	Olympic Games	Beijing, China	28th (q)	Hammer throw	70.98
2012	European Championships	Helsinki, Finland	30th (q)	Hammer throw	59.92
