= 2003 World Championships in Athletics – Men's shot put =

These are the official results of the Men's Shot Put event at the 2003 World Championships in Paris, France. There were a total number of 31 participating athletes, with the final held on Saturday 23 August 2003.

== Medalists ==
Gold	Andrei Mikhnevich; Belarus (BLR)
Silver	Adam Nelson; United States (USA)
Bronze	Yuriy Bilonoh; Ukraine (UKR)

== Schedule ==
- All times are Central European Time (UTC+1)

Qualification Round
Group A	Group B
23.08.2003 – 08:30h	23.08.2003 – 08:30h
Final Round
23.08.2003 – 19:25h

== Abbreviations ==
- All results shown are in metres

Q	automatic qualification
q	qualification by rank
DNS	did not start
NM	no mark
WR	world record
AR	area record
NR	national record
PB	personal best
SB	season best

== Qualification ==
- Held on Saturday 23 August 2003

RANK	FINAL	GROUP A
1.	Yuriy Bilonoh (UKR)	20.84 m
2.	Adam Nelson (USA)	20.23 m
3.	Joachim Olsen (DEN)	20.14 m
4.	Ralf Bartels (GER)	20.06 m
5.	Milan Haborák (SVK)	19.95 m
6.	Pavel Lyzhyn (BLR)	19.84 m
7.	Petr Stehlík (CZE)	19.70 m
8.	Gheorghe Guset (ROU)	19.61 m
9.	Carl Myerscough (GBR)	19.51 m
10.	Pavel Chumachenko (RUS)	19.51 m
11.	Yury Bialou (BLR)	19.32 m
12.	Marco Antonio Verni (CHI)	19.24 m
13.	Conny Karlsson (FIN)	19.17 m
14.	Janus Robberts (RSA)	19.02 m
15.	Zsolt Bíber (HUN)	18.99 m
—	Reese Hoffa (USA)	NM

RANK	FINAL	GROUP B
1.	John Godina (USA)	21.08 m
2.	Andrei Mikhnevich (BLR)	20.89 m
3.	Tepa Reinikainen (FIN)	20.55 m
4.	Ville Tiisanoja (FIN)	20.37 m
5.	Justin Anlezark (AUS)	20.28 m
6.	Roman Virastyuk (UKR)	20.28 m
7.	Bradley Snyder (CAN)	20.10 m
8.	Manuel Martínez (ESP)	19.78 m
9.	Dragan Peric (SCG)	19.55 m
10.	Miran Vodovnik (SLO)	19.23 m
11.	Rutger Smith (NED)	19.02 m
12.	Pavel Sofin (RUS)	18.66 m
13.	Yuriy Parkhomenko (UKR)	18.25 m
—	Kevin Toth (USA)	DQ
—	Chima Ugwu (NGR)	DNS

== Final ==
RANK	FINAL	DISTANCE
	Andrei Mikhnevich (BLR)	21.69 m
	Adam Nelson (USA)	21.26 m
	Yuriy Bilonoh (UKR)	21.10 m
4.	Justin Anlezark (AUS)	20.61 m
5.	Ralf Bartels (GER)	20.50 m
6.	Tepa Reinikainen (FIN)	20.45 m
7.	Ville Tiisanoja (FIN)	20.09 m
8.	John Godina (USA)	19.84 m
9.	Roman Virastyuk (UKR)	19.61 m
10.	Bradley Snyder (CAN)	19.38 m
—	Kevin Toth (USA)	DQ
—	Joachim Olsen (DEN)	DNS

== See also ==
- 2003 Shot Put Year Ranking
