= Brad Mears =

American professor and retired shot putter

Brad Mears, Ed.D.
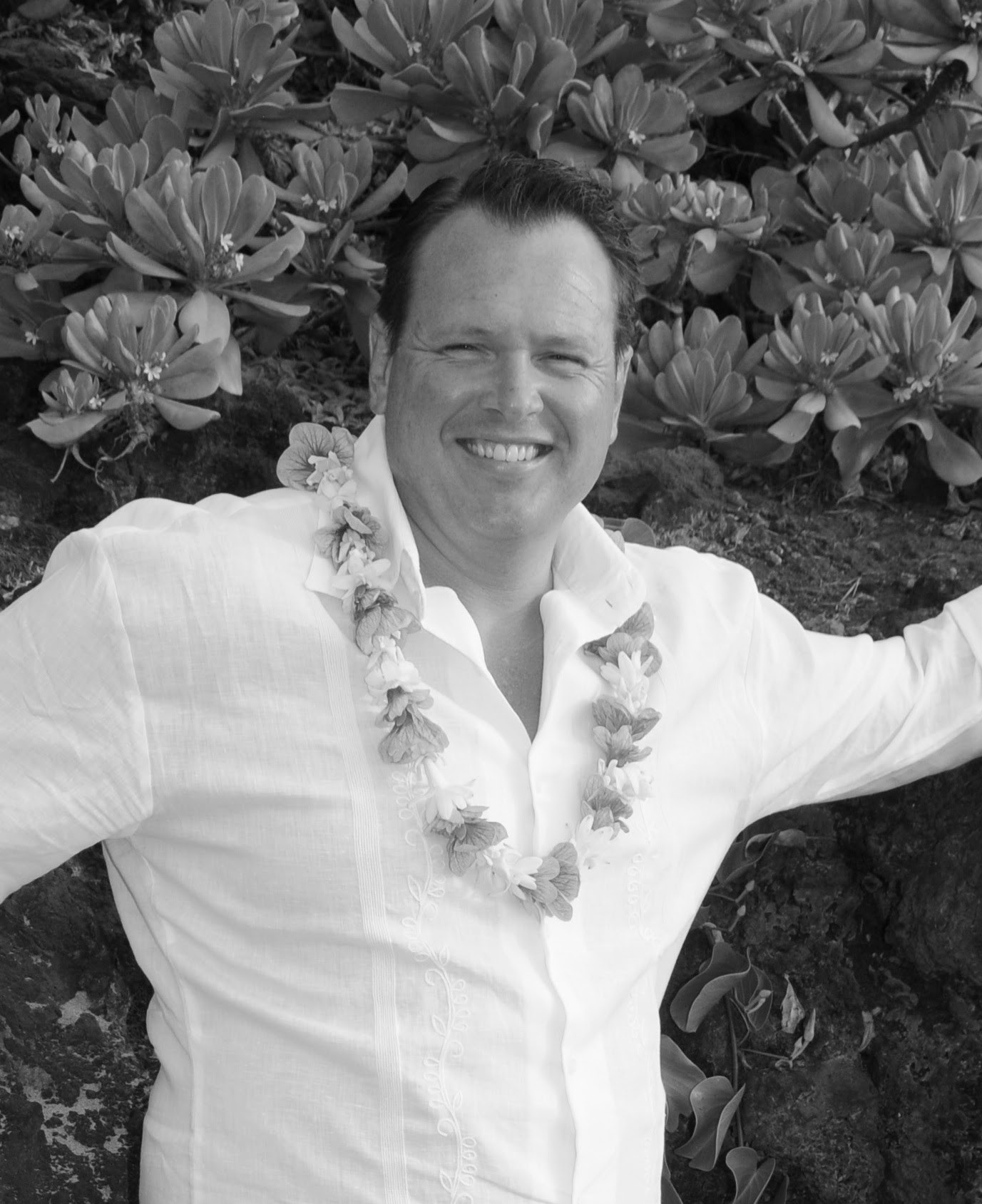

Personal information
- Born: December 24, 1970 (age 55) Neosho, Missouri, United States
Medal record
Men's Athletics
Representing the United States
Pan American Games
Gold medal – first place	1999 Winnipeg	Shot Put

Brad Mears (born December 24, 1970) is a University of Central Missouri professor and a retired American shot putter, who won the gold medal at the 1999 Pan American Games. His personal best throw is 21.30 meters (69 feet 11 inches), achieved in May 1999 in Greeley. He has earned a Doctorate in Pedagogy from the University of Northern Colorado in 2000, his master's from the University of Central Missouri in 1997 and his bachelor's degree from Central Missouri State University in 1994. He is a 1989 graduate of Neosho High School, Neosho Missouri.

As a Track and Field Athlete, Brad holds 9 Missouri All State titles for Neosho High School, and 7 All America Titles and a National Championship for the University of Central Missouri. He competed professionally in 1995–2000. Other athletic personal best are: Track and Field: Discus 61.60 meters (202 feet 1 inch), Javelin 63.90 meters (209 feet 8 inches). Olympic Weight Lifting Personal Bests (+109 group): Total 375 kilograms (827 pounds). Individual Lifts: Clean and Jerk 223 kilograms (492 pounds), Snatch 165 kilograms (364 pounds).

From 1994 to 1998, Brad was a public school teacher in the Warrensburg R-6 School District, Warrensburg, Missouri. During that time, he taught Early Childhood, Elementary, Middle School and High School Physical Education, Early Childhood, Middle School and High School Adapted Physical Education.

From 1994 to 1998, Brad was also a University of Central Missouri Track and Field Assistant Throws Coach, where he coached 7 All America titles and 1 National Champion.

As a professor of Pedagogy in Physical Education, at the University of Central Missouri, Brad's scholarly work has focused on human physical/structural development and function, related to the areas of Developmental Neurology, Brain Based Learning, Autism and Attention Deficit Disorder, Behavior Analysis and Child Development with over 200 publications and/or presentations worldwide.

Brad is also the President and CO-Founder of the Mears Foundation for Autism, a not for profit foundation that serves individuals, families, and communities impacted by autism.

== Achievements ==
Year	Competition	Venue	Position	Event	Notes
Representing the United States
1997	Universiade	Catania, Italy	4th	Shot put	19.57 m
1999	Pan American Games	Winnipeg, Canada	1st	Shot put	19.93 m
