= 2005 World Championships in Athletics – Men's hammer throw =

The Men's Hammer Throw event at the 2005 World Championships in Athletics was held at the Helsinki Olympic Stadium on August 6 and August 8.

== Medalists ==
Gold	Vadim Devyatovskiy; Belarus (BLR)
Silver	Szymon Ziółkowski; Poland (POL)
Bronze	Markus Esser; Germany (GER)

== Schedule ==
- All times are Eastern European Time (UTC+2)

Qualification Round
Group A	Group B
06.08.2005 – 11:30h	06.08.2005 – 13:05h
Final Round
08.08.2005 – 18:40h

== Abbreviations ==
- All results shown are in metres

Q	automatic qualification
q	qualification by rank
DNS	did not start
NM	no mark
WR	world record
AR	area record
NR	national record
PB	personal best
SB	season best

== Startlist ==
Order	№	Athlete	Season Best	Personal Best
GROUP A
1	7	Dorian Collaku (ALB)	75.78	76.96
2	876	Miloslav Konopka (SVK)	76.74	81.33
3	396	Holger Klose (GER)	79.23	82.22
4	814	Sergey Kirmasov (RUS)	78.97	82.62
5	944	Vladyslav Piskunov (UKR)	78.72	82.23
6	909	Dilshod Nazarov (TJK)	77.63	79.05
7	1000	A.G. Kruger (USA)	75.57	79.26
8	951	Ihor Tuhay (UKR)	78.85	79.46
9	782	Chris Harmse (RSA)	80.63	80.63
10	930	Eşref Apak (TUR)	81.45	81.45
11	21	Juan Ignacio Cerra (ARG)	74.78	76.42
12	812	Vadim Khersontsev (RUS)	79.47	81.26
13	71	Vadim Devyatovskiy (BLR)	84.90	84.90
14	169	András Haklits (CRO)	80.41	80.41
15	287	Olli-Pekka Karjalainen (FIN)	79.81	83.30
GROUP B
1	487	Nicola Vizzoni (ITA)	74.82	80.50
2	744	Szymon Ziółkowski (POL)	79.35	83.38
3	437	Krisztián Pars (HUN)	80.03	82.45
4	79	Ivan Tsikhan (BLR)	86.73	86.73
5	947	Andriy Skvaruk (UKR)	81.00	82.62
6	415	Alexandros Papadimitriou (GRE)	78.28	80.45
7	1017	James Parker (USA)	74.67	79.20
8	191	Lukáš Melich (CZE)	79.36	79.36
9	378	Markus Esser (GER)	80.00	81.10
10	213	Mohsen El Anany (EGY)	75.31	76.00
11	871	Patric Suter (SUI)	78.43	80.51
12	874	Libor Charfreitag (SVK)	80.85	81.81
13	815	Ilya Konovalov (RUS)	79.92	82.28
14	637	Roman Rozna (MDA)	75.80	76.62
15	594	Ali Al-Zinkawi (KUW)	76.25	77.37
16	81	Andrei Varantsou (BLR)	78.93	81.31

== Records ==
Standing records prior to the 2005 World Athletics Championships
World Record	Yuriy Sedykh (URS)	86.74 m	August 30, 1986	Stuttgart, West Germany
Event Record	Szymon Ziółkowski (POL)	83.38 m	August 5, 2001	Edmonton, Canada
Season Best	Ivan Tikhon (BLR)	86.73 m	July 3, 2005	Brest, Belarus
Broken records during the 2005 World Athletics Championships
Event Record	Ivan Tikhon (BLR)	83.89 m	August 8, 2005	Helsinki, Finland

== Qualification ==
Rank	Group	Athlete	#1	#2	#3	Result	Notes
1	A	Vadim Devyatovskiy (BLR)	76.86	81.20	—	81.20 m	
~~2~~	B	~~Ivan Tsikhan (BLR)~~	~~71.80~~	~~X~~	~~79.26~~	~~79.26 m~~	
2	B	Szymon Ziółkowski (POL)	75.47	78.34	—	78.34 m	
3	A	Olli-Pekka Karjalainen (FIN)	X	76.09	77.30	77.30 m	
4	B	Andriy Skvaruk (UKR)	75.69	X	77.21	77.21 m	
5	B	Krisztián Pars (HUN)	75.62	75.55	76.86	76.86 m	
6	A	Holger Klose (GER)	76.47	74.34	72.27	76.47 m	
7	B	Markus Esser (GER)	73.19	71.62	76.45	76.45 m	
8	B	Ilya Konovalov (RUS)	71.91	76.42	75.71	76.42 m	
9	B	Libor Charfreitag (SVK)	76.30	75.28	75.00	76.30 m	
~~11~~	A	~~Vladyslav Piskunov (UKR)~~	~~76.04~~	~~X~~	~~X~~	~~76.04 m~~	
10	A	Vadim Khersontsev (RUS)	74.94	X	75.92	75.92 m	
11	B	Alexandros Papadimitriou (GRE)	70.97	74.99	X	74.99 m	
12	B	Lukas Melich (CZE)	X	74.53	X	74.53 m	
13	A	Chris Harmse (RSA)	72.30	74.37	73.17	74.37 m	
14	A	A.G. Kruger (USA)	73.63	73.23	70.20	73.63 m	
15	A	Dilshod Nazarov (TJK)	73.34	73.38	69.43	73.38 m	
16	A	András Haklits (CRO)	73.26	71.51	X	73.26 m	
17	A	Eşref Apak (TUR)	73.00	X	73.04	73.04 m	
18	A	Miloslav Konopka (SVK)	X	72.91	X	72.91 m	
19	B	Ali Al-Zinkawi (KUW)	X	X	72.28	72.28 m	
20	B	James Parker (USA)	71.95	X	70.94	71.95 m	
21	B	Mohsen El Anany (EGY)	71.78	X	68.95	71.78 m	
22	B	Roman Rozna (MDA)	71.52	69.30	70.45	71.52 m	
23	A	Ihor Tuhay (UKR)	70.66	X	70.85	70.85 m	
24	B	Nicola Vizzoni (ITA)	X	70.77	X	70.77 m	
25	B	Andrei Varantsou (BLR)	X	69.71	X	69.71 m	
26	B	Patric Suter (SUI)	65.65	68.54	X	68.54 m	
27	A	Juan Ignacio Cerra (ARG)	67.72	68.44	67.50	68.44 m	
28	A	Dorian Collaku (ALB)	58.83	—	—	58.83 m	
—	A	Sergey Kirmasov (RUS)	X	X	X	NM	

== Final ==
Rank	Athlete	Attempts						Distance	Note
Rank	Athlete	1	2	3	4	5	6	Distance	Note
1st place, gold medalist(s)	Vadim Devyatovskiy (BLR)	78.11	80.45	82.60	X	80.47	82.19	82.60 m	
2nd place, silver medalist(s)	Szymon Ziółkowski (POL)	78.27	76.44	79.35	77.35	78.39	X	79.35 m	SB
3rd place, bronze medalist(s)	Markus Esser (GER)	78.57	79.11	76.88	79.16	77.11	X	79.16 m	
4	Olli-Pekka Karjalainen (FIN)	77.05	X	78.55	77.20	X	78.77	78.77 m	
5	Ilya Konovalov (RUS)	78.59	76.21	76.60	78.08	78.44	75.36	78.59 m	
6	Krisztián Pars (HUN)	76.21	X	77.26	78.03	76.85	X	78.03 m	
7	Vadim Khersontsev (RUS)	76.16	77.59	73.63	76.81	X	72.24	77.59 m	
8	Libor Charfreitag (SVK)	76.05	75.02	X				76.05 m	
9	Andriy Skvaruk (UKR)	74.81	72.69	76.01				76.01 m	
10	Holger Klose (GER)	74.41	X	74.80				74.80 m	
~~1~~	~~Ivan Tsikhan (BLR)~~	~~X~~	~~X~~	~~80.97~~	~~83.89~~	~~X~~	~~81.52~~	~~83.89 m~~	~~CR~~ DSQ
~~11~~	~~Vladyslav Piskunov (UKR)~~	~~74.78~~	~~73.44~~	~~74.32~~				~~74.78 m~~	DSQ

== See also ==
- 2005 Hammer Throw Year Ranking
