= Yuji Okano =

Japanese shot putter

Medal record

Men's athletics

Representing Japan

Asian Championships
Bronze medal – third place	1991 Kuala Lumpur	Shot put

Yuji Okano (born March 2, 1964) is a retired male shot putter from Japan. He set his personal best (17.65 metres) in the men's shot put event in Kuala Lumpur on 23 October 1991.

== International competitions ==
Representing Japan
Year	Competition	Venue	Position	Notes
1991	Asian Championships	Kuala Lumpur, Malaysia	3rd	17.65 m
1994	Asian Games	Hiroshima, Japan	7th	17.49 m
1999	World Indoor Championships	Maebashi, Japan	10th	16.72 m
