= Clay Cross (athlete) =

Australian shot putter

Clay Cross (born 26 November 1977 in Sydney) is an Australian shot putter. He won the Australian championships in 1996, 1997, 1999 and 2005.

Cross trained at the Randwick-Botany Little Athletics Club. He attended Waverley College. In 1994, he won the Australian championships in the under-18 category; in the same year, he won silver in the 1994 World School Sport Games; and he was awarded bronze in the 1996 World Junior Championships in Athletics. He trained with Oliver-Sven Buder.

His personal best is 19.42 metres, achieved in June 2004. This result makes him the all-time number one for New South Wales.

His brother Ryan Cross is a rugby league/rugby union player, and his father Paul played rugby league in the 1966 Grand Final.

== Achievements ==
Year	Competition	Venue	Position	Notes
Representing Australia
1996	World Junior Championships	Sydney, Australia	3rd	17.69 m
1998	Commonwealth Games	Kuala Lumpur, Malaysia	4th	19.16 m
2002	Commonwealth Games	Manchester, United Kingdom	6th	18.10 m
2003	Universiade	Daegu, South Korea	7th	18.71 m
2005	Universiade	İzmir, Turkey	8th	18.08 m
2006	Commonwealth Games	Melbourne, Australia	6th	18.44 m
