= Athletics at the 1999 Pan American Games – Men's shot put =

Men's shot put at the Pan American Games

The men's shot put event at the 1999 Pan American Games was held on July 24.

== Results ==
Rank	Name	Nationality	#1	#2	#3	#4	#5	#6	Result	Notes
1st place, gold medalist(s)	Brad Mears	United States	18.16	19.93	x	19.58	x	x	19.93	
2nd place, silver medalist(s)	Jamie Beyer	United States	17.64	x	18.65	x	18.95	x	18.95	
3rd place, bronze medalist(s)	Bradley Snyder	Canada	18.21	18.61	18.74	x	18.44	18.64	18.74	
4	Édson Miguel	Brazil	17.21	17.74	17.35	17.96	17.59	17.99	17.99	
5	Jason Tunks	Canada	16.50	16.86	17.35	17.04	x	17.66	17.66	
6	Marco Antonio Verni	Chile	15.97	16.40	x	16.49	16.65	x	16.65	
	Yojer Medina	Venezuela	x	–	–	–	–	–	NM	
