= 1999 European Athletics U23 Championships – Men's hammer throw =

The men's hammer throw event at the 1999 European Athletics U23 Championships was held in Gothenburg, Sweden, at Ullevi on 29 and 30 July 1999.

== Medalists ==
Gold	Vladislav Piskunov; Ukraine
Silver	András Haklits; Croatia
Bronze	Maciej Pałyszko; Poland

== Results ==
=== Final ===
30 July

Rank	Name	Nationality	Attempts						Result	Notes
Rank	Name	Nationality	1	2	3	4	5	6	Result	Notes
1st place, gold medalist(s)	Vladislav Piskunov	Ukraine	74.88	74.81	75.35	74.64	76.26	75.55	76.26	
2nd place, silver medalist(s)	András Haklits	Croatia	72.77	70.42	73.05	71.39	73.73	72.49	73.73	
3rd place, bronze medalist(s)	Maciej Pałyszko	Poland	68.48	72.76	72.93	73.50	70.19	72.68	73.50	
4	Vadim Devyatovskiy	Belarus	72.45	73.11	72.07	72.97	72.67	73.34	73.34	
5	Libor Charfreitag	Slovakia	x	69.70	71.48	x	71.86	72.82	72.82	
6	Mikko Dannbäck	Finland	69.74	71.20	x	x	71.67	71.35	71.67	
7	Aleksey Zagornyi	Russia	70.36	x	x	x	x	71.33	71.33	
8	Patric Suter	Switzerland	70.18	x	68.23	x	69.32	x	70.18	
9	Nicolas Figère	France	69.36	67.66	67.92				69.36	
10	Dorian Çollaku	Albania	66.93	68.58	67.52				68.58	
11	Oleg Sergeyev	Russia	65.21	68.34	68.47				68.47	
12	Primož Kozmus	Slovenia	66.11	x	x				66.11	

=== Qualifications ===
29 July
Qualifying 72.00 or 12 best to the Final

==== Group A ====
Rank	Name	Nationality	Result	Notes
1	Mikko Dannbäck	Finland	71.34	q
2	Aleksey Zagornyi	Russia	70.53	q
3	Libor Charfreitag	Slovakia	70.09	q
4	Dorian Çollaku	Albania	69.82	q
5	Primož Kozmus	Slovenia	68.01	q
6	Samu-Petri Simo	Finland	67.59	
7	Moisés Campeny	Spain	66.99	
8	Marco Lingua	Italy	66.62	
9	Nikolaos Koronákos	Greece	66.24	
10	Jérôme Soupe	France	62.85	
11	Michał Kozłowski	Poland	62.77	
12	Andrian Andreev	Bulgaria	57.39	

==== Group B ====
Rank	Name	Nationality	Result	Notes
1	Vladislav Piskunov	Ukraine	72.74	Q
2	Maciej Pałyszko	Poland	72.23	Q
3	Vadim Devyatovskiy	Belarus	71.45	q
4	Patric Suter	Switzerland	71.25	q
5	András Haklits	Croatia	70.92	q
6	Oleg Sergeyev	Russia	69.08	q
7	Nicolas Figère	France	68.26	q
8	Eric Albert	France	65.97	
9	Péter Botfa	Hungary	65.60	
10	Ioannis Barlis	Greece	64.45	
11	Jarkko Paljakka	Finland	61.77	

== Participation ==
According to an unofficial count, 23 athletes from 16 countries participated in the event.

- Albania (1)
- Belarus (1)
- Bulgaria (1)
- Croatia (1)
- Finland (3)
- France (3)
- Greece (2)
- Hungary (1)
- Italy (1)
- Poland (2)
- Russia (2)
- Slovakia (1)
- Slovenia (1)
- Spain (1)
- Switzerland (1)
- Ukraine (1)
