= 1996 World Junior Championships in Athletics – Men's hammer throw =

The men's hammer throw event at the 1996 World Junior Championships in Athletics was held in Sydney, Australia, at International Athletic Centre on 23 and 24 August. A 7257g (senior implement) hammer was used.

== Medalists ==
Gold	Maciej Pałyszko; Poland
Silver	Vadim Devyatovskiy; Belarus
Bronze	Roman Konevtsov; Russia

== Results ==
=== Final ===
24 August

Rank	Name	Nationality	Attempts						Result	Notes
Rank	Name	Nationality	1	2	3	4	5	6	Result	Notes
1st place, gold medalist(s)	Maciej Pałyszko	Poland	69.54	70.90	70.58	70.46	70.22	71.24	71.24	
2nd place, silver medalist(s)	Vadim Devyatovskiy	Belarus	68.26	70.88	65.56	67.66	68.40	69.24	70.88	
3rd place, bronze medalist(s)	Roman Konevtsov	Russia	x	69.44	x	70.32	x	68.84	70.32	
4	Sergey Martemyanov	Belarus	66.42	x	x	68.22	x	x	68.22	
5	Mikko Dannbäck	Finland	63.80	66.70	66.06	67.68	67.34	63.70	67.68	
6	Yosmel Montes	Cuba	x	67.34	x	x	64.90	65.70	67.34	
7	Oleg Sergeyev	Russia	65.90	67.12	63.64	x	64.78	63.04	67.12	
8	Ioánnis Barlís	Greece	x	65.38	65.10	66.14	65.02	66.52	66.52	
9	Samu-Petri Simo	Finland	64.88	x	65.18				65.18	
10	Xavier Tison	France	64.12	62.82	x				64.12	
11	Roman Tcherkachine	Ukraine	58.82	60.90	x				60.90	
	Frank Caspers	Germany	x	x	x				NM	

=== Qualifications ===
23 Aug

==== Group A ====
Rank	Name	Nationality	Attempts			Result	Notes
Rank	Name	Nationality	1	2	3	Result	Notes
1	Maciej Pałyszko	Poland	67.14	-	-	67.14	Q
2	Mikko Dannbäck	Finland	66.20	-	-	66.20	Q
3	Xavier Tison	France	x	63.18	64.74	64.74	Q
4	Ioánnis Barlís	Greece	x	64.06	-	64.06	Q
5	Sergey Martemyanov	Belarus	x	64.04	-	64.04	Q
6	Yosmel Montes	Cuba	62.28	63.70	63.76	63.76	q
7	Frank Caspers	Germany	62.76	61.48	60.02	62.76	q
8	Oleg Sergeyev	Russia	61.88	x	x	61.88	q
9	Libor Charfreitag	Slovakia	61.52	59.22	x	61.52	
10	Cameron Grant	Australia	x	57.64	58.32	58.32	
11	Patric Suter	Switzerland	56.36	x	x	56.36	
12	David Spitz	United States	x	x	53.48	53.48	
13	Hamoud Al-Anzi	Kuwait	x	x	42.00	42.00	

==== Group B ====
Rank	Name	Nationality	Attempts			Result	Notes
Rank	Name	Nationality	1	2	3	Result	Notes
1	Vadim Devyatovskiy	Belarus	65.38	-	-	65.38	Q
2	Roman Konevtsov	Russia	64.72	-	-	64.72	Q
3	Samu-Petri Simo	Finland	64.44	-	-	64.44	Q
4	Roman Tcherkachine	Ukraine	58.72	60.72	61.78	61.78	q
5	Thomas Bourgeois	France	60.14	61.18	x	61.18	
6	András Haklits	Hungary	60.30	x	x	60.30	
7	Patrick Hiemer	Germany	56.10	60.14	58.54	60.14	
8	Dorian Çollaku	Albania	59.58	59.08	59.72	59.72	
9	Anscar Salgado	Spain	59.24	58.92	x	59.24	
10	Nuno Coelho	Portugal	x	53.88	57.68	57.68	
11	Theoharis Hatziadamidis	Greece	52.92	54.30	57.06	57.06	
12	Yamine Hussein	Egypt	50.34	52.20	56.30	56.30	
13	Alexandre Kojokar	Moldova	x	53.04	53.14	53.14	
14	Oleg Toulaev	Tajikistan	x	44.30	x	44.30	

== Participation ==
According to an unofficial count, 27 athletes from 21 countries participated in the event.

- Albania (1)
- Australia (1)
- Belarus (2)
- Cuba (1)
- Egypt (1)
- Finland (2)
- France (2)
- Germany (2)
- Greece (2)
- Hungary (1)
- Kuwait (1)
- Moldova (1)
- Poland (1)
- Portugal (1)
- Russia (2)
- Slovakia (1)
- Spain (1)
- Switzerland (1)
- Tajikistan (1)
- Ukraine (1)
- United States (1)
