= Justin Anlezark =

Australian shot putter (born 1977)

Justin ("Judo") Anlezark (born 14 August 1977 in Katherine, Northern Territory) is an Australian male shot putter. His personal best throw is 20.96 metres, achieved in April 2003 in Brisbane.

Anlezark was the first Australian male to reach a World Championship Shot Put final in 2003, and his 4th-place finish remains the best ever performance by an Australian man in a throwing event at this level. He followed this up with a sixth-place finish at the 2004 Olympics, another best ever performance by an Australian in his event.

After the 2004 Olympics, Anlezark had a few mediocre seasons, but after throwing 20.33 and 20.41 at the Loughborough International meet in 2008, selectors nominated Anlezark to the Australian Olympic Committee for selection in the team for the 2008 Summer Olympics. He joined Scott Martin making this the first Olympics since Melbourne in 1956 that Australia was represented by two male shotputters. Neither of them reached the final round.

== Achievements ==
Year	Competition	Venue	Position	Event	Notes
Representing Australia
1994	World Junior Championships	Lisbon, Portugal	12th	Shot put	15.67 m
1994	World Junior Championships	Lisbon, Portugal	23rd (q)	Discus	45.18 m
1996	World Junior Championships	Sydney, Australia	2nd	Shot put	18.21 m
1996	World Junior Championships	Sydney, Australia	13th (q)	Discus	48.70 m
1998	World Cup	Johannesburg, South Africa	7th	Shot put	18.26 m
1998	Commonwealth Games	Kuala Lumpur, Malaysia	7th	Shot put	18.44 m
2001	World Championships	Edmonton, Canada	27th (q)	Shot put	18.70 m
2001	Goodwill Games	Brisbane, Australia	7th	Shot put	19.42 m
2002	Commonwealth Games	Manchester, United Kingdom	1st	Shot put	20.91 m
2002	World Cup	Madrid, Spain	2nd	Shot put	20.77 m
2003	World Indoor Championships	Birmingham, United Kingdom	5th	Shot put	20.65 m
2003	World Championships	Paris, France	4th	Shot put	20.61 m
2003	World Athletics Final	Monte Carlo, Monaco	7th	Shot put	19.96 m
2004	Olympic Games	Olympia, Greece	6th	Shot put	20.31 m
2008	Olympic Games	Beijing, China	16th (q)	Shot put	19.91 m
2009	World Championships	Berlin, Germany	13th (q)	Shot put	19.94 m

In 1996 he won the national title in the men's discus throw.
