= 2001 IAAF World Indoor Championships – Men's shot put =

The men's shot put event at the 2001 IAAF World Indoor Championships was held on March 9.

== Results ==
Rank	Athlete	Nationality	#1	#2	#3	#4	#5	#6	Result	Notes
1st place, gold medalist(s)	John Godina	United States	X	20.17	20.02	20.72	X	20.82	20.82	SB
2nd place, silver medalist(s)	Adam Nelson	United States	20.72	X	X	X	X	X	20.72	
3rd place, bronze medalist(s)	Manuel Martínez	Spain	19.87	20.10	19.84	19.83	X	20.67	20.67	
4	Timo Aaltonen	Finland	19.61	X	19.80	X	19.63	20.24	20.24	SB
5	Paolo Dal Soglio	Italy	19.97	X	19.84	20.17	X	X	20.17	
6	Miroslav Menc	Czech Republic	19.58	19.56	19.86	20.08	X	19.93	20.08	
7	Milan Haborák	Slovakia	19.60	20.05	X	X	X	X	20.05	
8	Yuriy Belonog	Ukraine	19.71	X	X	X	X	X	19.71	
9	Gheorghe Guset	Romania	19.26	19.68	19.45				19.68	
10	Pavel Chumachenko	Russia	19.55	19.66	19.45				19.66	
11	Bradley Snyder	Canada	18.53	X	19.56				19.56	
12	Roman Virastyuk	Ukraine	19.55	X	19.45				19.55	
	Alexis Paumier	Cuba	X	X	X				NM	
