= Bradley Snyder (shot putter) =

Canadian shot putter

Personal information
- Born: January 8, 1976 (age 50) Windsor, Ontario, Canada

Sport
- Sport: Track and field
Medal record
Representing Canada
Pan American Games
Bronze medal – third place	1999 Winnipeg	Shot put
Bronze medal – third place	2003 Santo Domingo	Shot put

Bradley "Brad" Snyder (born January 8, 1976) is a Canadian retired shot putter, whose personal best throw is 20.87 metres, achieved in June 2004 in Atlanta.

Born in Windsor, Ontario, Snyder earned a full-ride scholarship at the University of South Carolina from 1995 to 1999 and was a dominant force in collegiate athletics. Snyder never lost a Southeastern Conference championship. He was the school's first athlete to win eight SEC titles and was an all-American in seven-of-eight seasons (indoor and outdoor). In 1998, he won all 19 meets and was the SEC track and field athlete of the year and was later inducted into the school's sports hall of fame. He competed in three Olympics and retired after the 2004 season.

== International competitions ==
Year	Competition	Venue	Position	Event	Notes
Representing Canada
1994	World Junior Championships	Lisbon, Portugal	14th (q)	Shot put	15.65 m
1995	Pan American Junior Championships	Santiago, Chile	1st	Shot put	16.74 m
1996	Olympic Games	Atlanta, United States	31st (q)	Shot put	17.98 m
1997	World Championships	Athens, Greece	20th (q)	Shot put	18.94 m
1997	Universiade	Catania, Italy	15th	Shot put	16.99 m
1998	Goodwill Games	Uniondale, United States	6th	Shot put	19.62 m
1999	Universiade	Palma de Mallorca, Spain	4th	Shot put	19.80 m
1999	Universiade	Palma de Mallorca, Spain	16th (q)	Discus throw	57.34 m
1999	Pan American Games	Winnipeg, Manitoba, Canada	3rd	Shot put	18.74 m
2000	Olympic Games	Sydney, Australia	13th (q)	Shot put	19.77 m
2001	World Indoor Championships	Lisbon, Portugal	11th	Shot put	19.56 m
2001	Jeux de la Francophonie	Ottawa-Hull, Canada	1st	Shot put	19.64 m
2001	World Championships	Edmonton, Alberta, Canada	8th	Shot put	20.63 m
2002	Commonwealth Games	Manchester, United Kingdom	4th	Shot put	19.63 m
2003	Pan American Games	Santo Domingo, Dominican Republic	3rd	Shot put	20.10 m
2003	World Championships	Paris, France	10th	Shot put	19.38 m
2004	Olympic Games	Athens, Greece	19th (q)	Shot put	19.46 m

Preceded by Bruno Pauletto, 20.61 m	Canadian national record holder, shot put, 20.63 m 4 August 2001 –	Succeeded by
