= Ryan Cross =

Australia international rugby union & league footballer

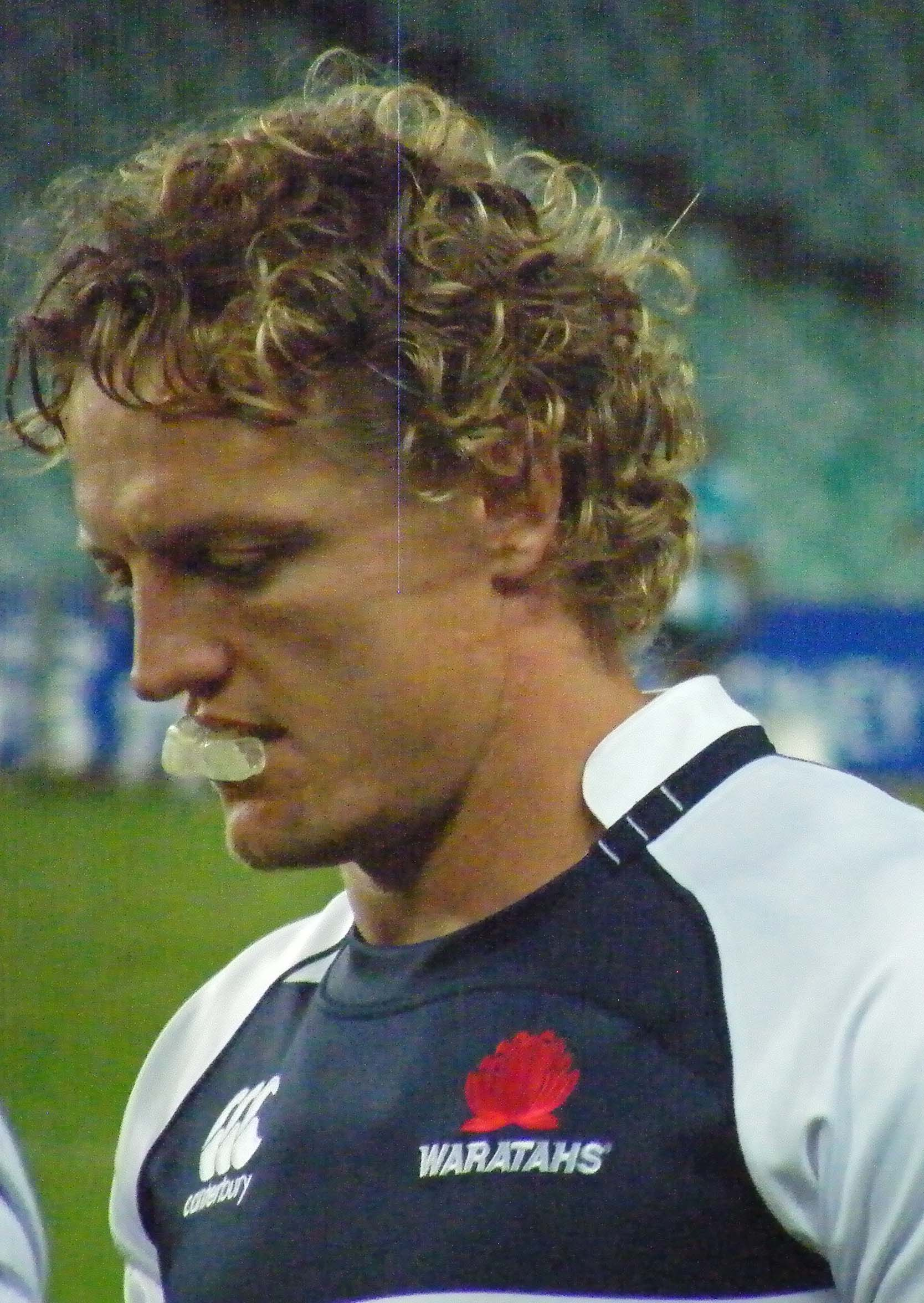

Personal information
- Full name: Ryan Cross
- Born: 6 October 1979 (age 47) Sydney, New South Wales, Australia

Playing information
- Height: 191 cm (6 ft 3 in)
- Weight: 102 kg (16 st 1 lb)

Rugby league
- Position: Centre, Wing
Club
Years	Team	Pld	T	G	FG	P
1998–06	Sydney Roosters	143	85	4	0	348
Representative
Years	Team	Pld	T	G	FG	P
2004–05	City Origin	2	2	0	0	8
2005	Prime Minister's XIII	1	2	0	0	8

Rugby union
- Position: Outside Centre
Club
Years	Team	Pld	T	G	FG	P
2007–10	Western Force	49	15	0	0	35
2007–08	Perth Spirit	8	3	0	0	15
2011	NSW Waratahs	16	8	0	0	40
2011–12	USA Perpignan	7	0	0	0	0
2012	Racing Metro 92	4	3	0	0	0
	Total	84	29	0	0	90
Representative
Years	Team	Pld	T	G	FG	P
1996–97	Australia Schoolboys	3	4	0	0	0
2006–07	Australia A	5	4	0	0	20
2008–10	Wallabies	19	6	0	0	30
- Education: Waverley College
- Father: Paul Cross
- Relatives: Clay Cross (brother)

Ryan Cross (born 6 October 1979) is a former Rugby Union footballer for Racing Metro 92 after signing from USA Perpignan in the French Top 14. He previously played for the Sydney Roosters in the National Rugby League (NRL) competition, the Western Force and the NSW Waratahs in Super Rugby and the Australia national rugby union team.

== Early life ==
Son of former professional rugby league footballer Paul Cross, a Coogee Randwick Wombats junior who played on the wing for the club in the 1964 and 1965 seasons, Ryan was a product of Waverley College, and was a member of the Australian Schools side in both 1996 and 1997, some of his teammates being future Wallabies Matt Dunning, Adam Freier, David Lyons, George Smith, Phil Waugh and Craig Wing. But he decided to switch codes and joined the Sydney Roosters rugby league club. His brother Clay is an international shot put athlete.

== Rugby league career ==
Cross made his first-grade debut on 17 April 1998, scoring two tries against the Manly-Warringah Sea Eagles. After a promising start to his league career, including an appearance at centre in the 2000 NRL Grand Final, the Roosters' first in 20 years, he had two serious leg injuries. A broken leg saw him miss much of the 2001 NRL season. Just a few matches into the 2002 NRL season he suffered a major knee injury that kept him out for the remainder of that year. That season, Sydney Roosters won the Premiership, their first in 27 years. Cross returned in the 2003 NRL season, finishing as the club's leading try-scorer. He played at centre in the Roosters' loss to the Panthers in the 2003 NRL Grand Final.

In 2004 Cross was chosen to represent City Origin. He then went on to play for the Roosters at centre in their loss to cross-Sydney rivals the Bulldogs in the 2004 NRL Grand Final.

In 2005 Cross was again chosen to represent City Origin. He was suspended for six weeks for eye-gouging Parramatta's Glenn Morrison in a match which the Roosters won 12–8. His absence proved costly for the Roosters as they just missed the finals that year. Cross was named the 2005 Sydney Roosters season player of the year.

In June 2006, after a period of speculation and rumour, Cross signed a two-year deal with the Australian Rugby Union and went to Perth to play for the new Super Rugby side, the Western Force. Cross left the Roosters as the fifth-highest try scorer in the club's history, with 85 tries from his 143 matches. He also played in three losing Grand Finals for the club.

== Rugby union career ==
Cross made his debut Super Rugby with the Western Force on 2 February 2007, against the Highlanders. He went on to play every match that season and scored three tries.

After an outstanding 2008 Super 14 season, in which he won The West Australian/Rosendorff Emirates Western Force Player of the Year Award, Cross was called up for national duty by new Wallabies coach Robbie Deans.

He scored his first Wallaby try against France at the Suncorp Stadium, Brisbane, in his second test on 5 July 2008, having come on as a Second-Half replacement. He followed this with another try later on in the game, both came from Matt Giteau passes.

Ryan Cross got his full test debut against New Zealand on 26 July in place of the injured Stirling Mortlock. He scored the first try which contributed to the 34–19 victory over the All Blacks.

In 2011 Cross signed with the NSW Waratahs and played in 15 matches during the 2011 Super Rugby season. After playing off the bench in the first few matches, Cross then played the remaining matches as the regular starting centre, including the semi-final loss to the Auckland Blues in Auckland.

At the conclusion of the 2011 Super Rugby season Cross signed for USA Perpignan in the French Top 14. The 3-month contract was cover for centres David Marty and Maxime Mermoz who were on 2011 Rugby World Cup duty with the French team who lost the final to host team New Zealand. He currently plays for Racing Metro 92.

Ryan stepped back into Suburban Rugby in Sydney and played for 2 seasons for Balmain Rugby who won the Kentwell cup competition as joint premiers in 2013..
