= Roman Rozna =

Moldovan hammer thrower

Personal information
- Born: 25 March 1976 (age 50) Grigoriopol, Moldavian SSR

Sport
- Sport: Track and field

Roman Rozna (born 25 March 1976) is a male hammer thrower from Moldova. His personal best throw is 76.62 metres, achieved in June 2003 in Minsk.

He finished twelfth at the 2001 Summer Universiade and seventh at the 2003 Summer Universiade. He also competed at the 2005 World Championships, the 2006 European Championships as well as the Olympic Games in 2000, 2004 and 2008 without reaching the final.

== Achievements ==
Year	Competition	Venue	Position	Event	Notes
Representing Moldova
1997	Universiade	Catania, Italy	17th (q)	Shot put	16.55 m
2000	Olympic Games	Sydney, Australia	40th (q)	Hammer throw	68.01 m
2001	Universiade	Beijing, China	11th	Hammer throw	66.71 m
2004	Olympic Games	Athens, Greece	28th (q)	Hammer throw	71.78 m
2005	World Championships	Helsinki, Finland	24th (q)	Hammer throw	71.52 m
2006	European Championships	Gothenburg, Sweden	22nd (q)	Hammer throw	68.21 m
2008	Olympic Games	Beijing, PR China	26th (q)	Hammer throw	71.33 m
