= 2022 World Masters Athletics Championships =

Coordinates: 61.4925°N 23.764167°E

- Dates: 29 June–10 July 2022
- Host city: Tampere, Finland
- Venue: Ratinan Stadion
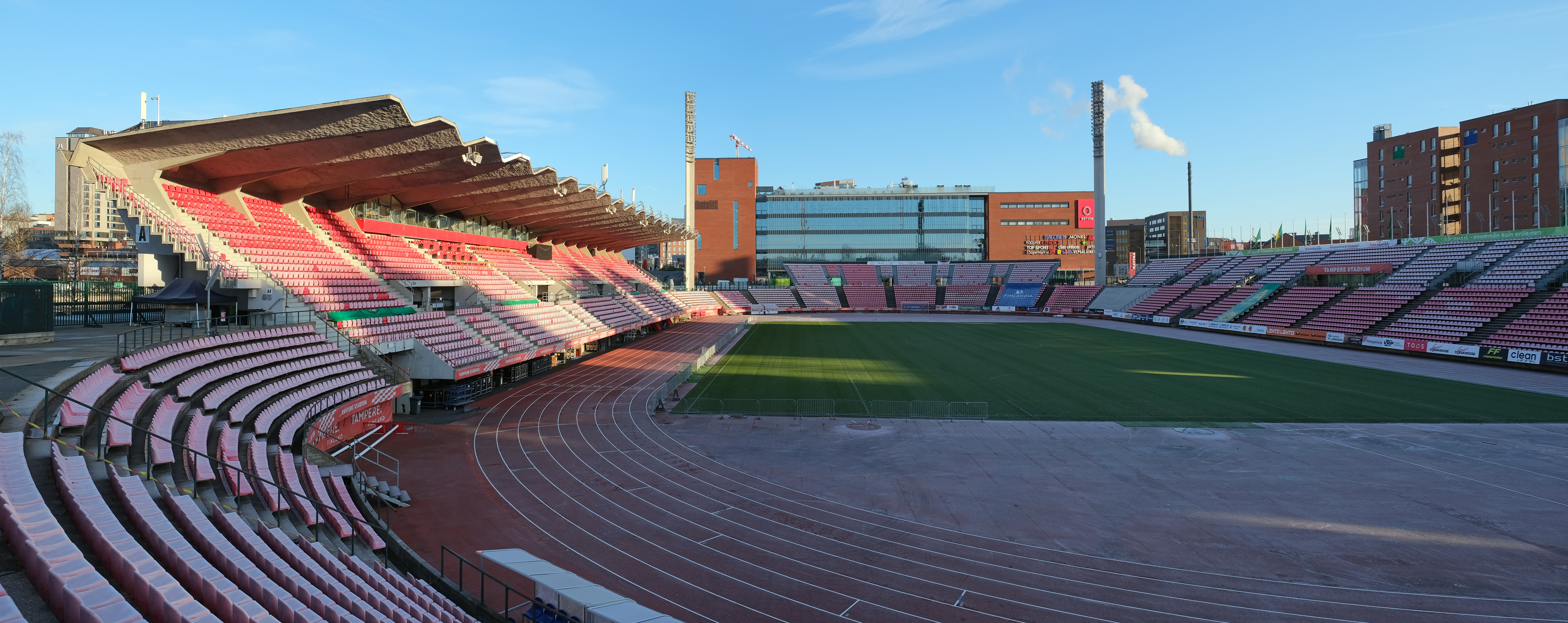
- Level: Masters
- Type: Outdoor
- Official website: www.wmatampere2022.com

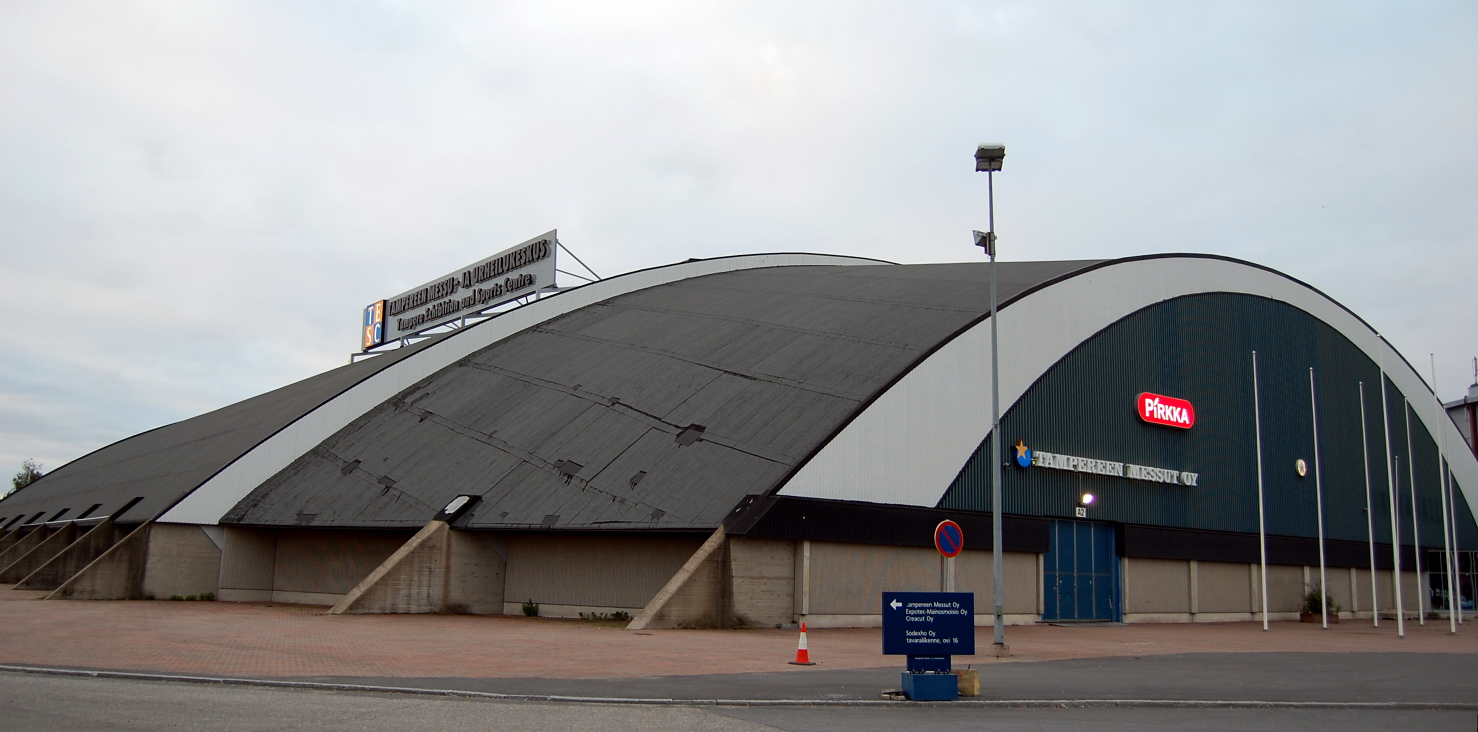
TESC

2022 World Masters Athletics Championships is the 24th in a series of World Masters Athletics Outdoor Championships that took place in Tampere, Finland, from 29 June to 10 July 2022.

The main venue was Ratinan Stadion (Tampere Stadium). Supplemental venues include Hervannan keskusurheilukenttä (Hervanta Sports Field), Pyynikin urheilukenttä (Pyynikki Sports Field), Tampere Exhibition and Sports Centre (TESC) for throwing events, and Pyynikki Ridge for Cross Country.

This edition was originally scheduled for 20 July to 1 August 2020 in Toronto, Canada, but that was cancelled due to the COVID-19 pandemic and rescheduled.

This Championships is organized by World Masters Athletics (WMA) in coordination with a Local Organising Committee (LOC): Juha Yli-Rajala (City of Tampere), Harri Aalto (Finnish Athletics).

The WMA is the global governing body of the sport of athletics for athletes 35 years of age or older, setting rules for masters athletics competition.

A full range of track and field events were held. In addition, non-stadia events included 8K Cross Country, 10K Race Walk, 20K Race Walk and Half Marathon.

== Results ==
Official results are archived at WMA.

== Medal table ==
Top ten nations

* Host nation (Finland)

Rank	Nation	Gold	Silver	Bronze	Total
1	Finland*	128	131	118	377
2	Germany	76	58	41	175
3	Great Britain	75	46	42	163
4	United States	64	57	41	162
5	Spain	35	45	23	103
6	France	32	27	24	83
7	Ireland	24	13	16	53
8	Australia	22	20	18	60
9	Italy	20	23	24	67
10	Sweden	18	18	26	62
Totals (10 entries)		494	438	373	1,305
