= Leif Larsen (American football) =

Norwegian athlete (born 1975)

Profile
- Position: Defensive tackle

Personal information
- Born: April 3, 1975 (age 51); Oslo, Norway
- Listed height: 6 ft 4 in (1.93 m)
- Listed weight: 300 lb (136 kg)

Career information
- College: UTEP
- NFL draft: 2000: 6th round, 194th overall pick

Career history
- Buffalo Bills (2000–2001)

Career NFL statistics
- Total tackles: 23
- Sacks: 2
- Stats at Pro Football Reference

Leif Olve Dolonen Larsen (born April 3, 1975) is a Norwegian athlete who has competed in shot put, American football and professional boxing.

== Shot put ==
In shot putting, Larsen finished thirteenth at the 1992 World Junior Championships and fourth at the 1994 World Junior Championships. His last international athletics competition was the 1997 European under-23 Championships, where he finished eighth. His personal best throw was 18.76 metres, achieved in April 1997 in Baton Rouge.

== American football ==
Pre-draft measurables
Height	Weight	Arm length	Hand span	40-yard dash	10-yard split	20-yard split	20-yard shuttle	Three-cone drill	Vertical jump	Broad jump	Bench press
6 ft 4 1/2 in (1.94 m)	300 lb (136 kg)	32 1/2 in (0.83 m)	9 1/4 in (0.23 m)	5.10 s	1.74 s	2.94 s	4.37 s	7.46 s	30.0 in (0.76 m)	9 ft 2 in (2.79 m)	45 reps
All values from NFL Combine

Larsen played college football for UTEP Miners and was drafted 194th overall by the Buffalo Bills in the 2000 NFL draft, therefore being one of the 198 players drafted before Tom Brady. Larsen appeared with the Bills in the 2000 and 2001 seasons. At the 2000 NFL Combine, Larsen bench pressed 225 lb (102 kg) 45 times, one of the best marks of all time.

== Boxing ==
Leif Larsen
Personal information
- Born: April 3, 1975 (age 51) Tofte, Norway
- Height: 6 ft 4 in (193 cm)
- Weight: Heavyweight

Boxing career
- Stance: Orthodox

Boxing record
- Total fights: 19
- Wins: 17
- Win by KO: 14
- Losses: 2

Larsen retired from football to pursue a boxing career. Since his first fight in 2003, he has won nine out of nine matches, eight of these by knockout.

He defeated British heavyweight boxer Danny Williams in Pabellon Municipal, Silla, Valencia, Comunidad Valenciana, Spain on 2 December 2011.
