= Ivan Tsikhan =

Belarusian hammer thrower (born 1976)

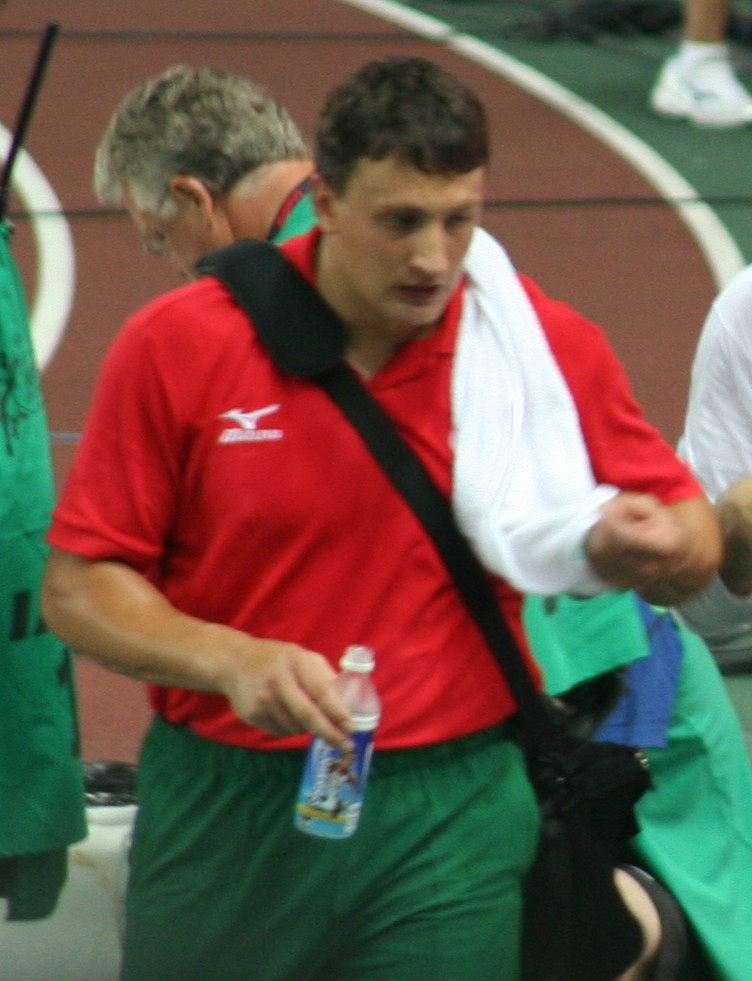
- Tsikhan at the 2007 World Championships

Personal information
- Native name: Іван Рыгоравіч Ціхан
- Full name: Ivan Ryhoravich Tsikhan
- Nationality: Belarusian
- Born: 24 July 1976 (age 49) Hloŭsievičy, Slonim District, Soviet Union
- Height: 1.86 m (6 ft 1 in)
- Weight: 110 kg (243 lb)

Sport
- Sport: Athletics
- Event: Hammer throw
- Club: Dynamo Hrodna
- Coached by: Sergey Litvinov

Achievements and titles
- Personal best: 84.51 m (2008)
Medal record
Representing Belarus
Olympic Games
| Disqualified | 2004 Athens | Hammer |
| Bronze medal – third place | 2008 Beijing | Hammer |
| Silver medal – second place | 2016 Rio de Janeiro | Hammer |
World Championships
| Gold medal – first place | 2003 Paris | Hammer |
| Disqualified | 2005 Helsinki | Hammer |
| Gold medal – first place | 2007 Osaka | Hammer |
European Championships
| Silver medal – second place | 2016 Amsterdam | Hammer |
| Disqualified | 2006 Gothenburg | Hammer |
IAAF World Cup in Athletics
| Silver medal – second place | 2006 Athens | Hammer |
IAAF World Athletics Final
| Disqualified | 2005 Monaco | Hammer |
| Gold medal – first place | 2007 Stuggart | Hammer |
| Disqualified | 2004 Monaco | Hammer |
| Silver medal – second place | 2006 Stuggart | Hammer |
| Bronze medal – third place | 2003 Monaco | Hammer |
Universiade
| Gold medal – first place | 2003 Daegu | Hammer |

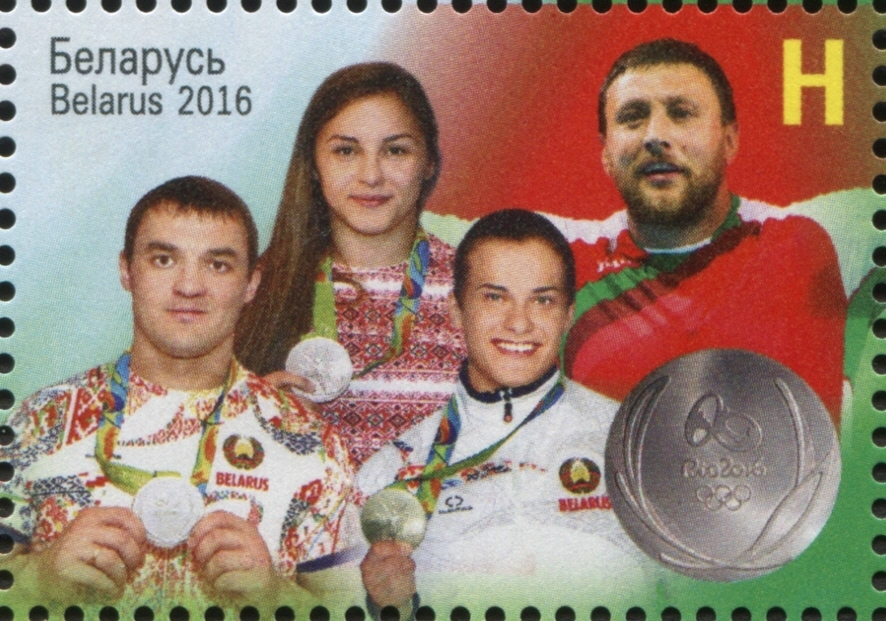
Tsikhan (right) on a 2016 stamp of Belarus

Ivan Ryhoravich Tsikhan (born 24 July 1976) is a Belarusian hammer thrower. He is a two-time world champion and an Olympic medalist.

== Personal life ==
Tsikhan was born in the village of Hloŭsievičy, Slonim district, Grodno Region, Belarusian SSR. He now lives in Grodno. His wife Volha is also an athlete, a discus thrower. Ivan and Volha have one son, Ivan. Tsikhan was coached by the former Olympic champion Sergey Litvinov.

== Sport career ==
Tsikhan competed at his first World Championships in 1997, he reached the final but failed to record a mark. He also failed to do so at the 1998 European Championships, but finished tied for third in the final at the 2000 Olympic Games. He was ranked fourth because he did not have a superior second best. He then finished sixth at the 2001 Summer Universiade and ninth at the 2002 European Championships, and competed at the 2001 World Championships without reaching the final.

The year 2003 was Tsikhan's break out season. He surpassed the 80-metre barrier for the first time. He became world champion for the first time in 2003 in Paris, with a throw of 83.03 meters. He won the 2003 Summer Universiade, and finished third at the inaugural World Athletics Final. He had a best of 84.32 metres, achieved in August in Minsk.

In 2004, At the 2004 Olympic Games in Athens Tsikhan won the silver medal with a throw of 79.81 metres, however, after retesting his doping sample in 2012 IOC disqualified him. At the World Athletics Final he took the silver. He had a best of 84.46 metres, achieved in August in Minsk.

In 2005, he came in first at the World Championships and World Athletics Final, but was later stripped of his gold medals from both events because doping violations. In the Belarusian national championship in Brest in July, he came within one centimeter of the world record of 86.74 held by Youri Sedykh since 1986.

In 2006, Tsikhan won the European Championships. He also finished second at the 2006 World Athletics Final and the 2006 World Cup. His season's best throw was 81.12 metres.

In 2007 Tsikhan won his third World Championships with a throw of 83.64 metres. This was his season's best. He again won the 2007 World Athletics Final.

In 2008, Tsikhan had a season's best of 84.51 metres, achieved in July in Grodno. He finished third at the 2008 Olympic Games with a throw of 81.51 metres.

In 2016, Tsikhan competed for Belarus at the 2016 Summer Olympics. He won silver with a throw of 77.79 metres. He was the flag bearer for Belarus during the closing ceremony.

== Doping offenses ==
Both Tsikhan and silver medalist and fellow Belarusian Vadim Devyatovskiy tested positive for abnormal levels of testosterone after the hammer throw finals on 12 August 2008 at the 2008 Summer Olympics. Both men were stripped of their medals by the International Olympic Committee and appealed to the Court of Arbitration for Sport (CAS). If the Court had rejected their appeal, Tsikhan would have served a two-year suspension and been banned from the 2012 Summer Olympics in London. However, In June 2010 the CAS ruled in his favor and due to discrepancies in drug testing he was reawarded his bronze medal. The CAS stated that he was not cleared of suspicion, insisting the verdict "should not be interpreted as an exoneration".

In May 2012, banned substances were found in Tsikhan's samples from the 2004 Summer Olympics after being retested, he was subsequently withdrawn from the 2012 Summer Games, and he was later disqualified by IOC.

Doping sanctions were announced for Tsikhan in the IAAF Newsletter in March 2014: in April 2014, the IAAF confirmed the annulment of all his results between 22 August 2004 and 21 August 2006.

== Personal best ==
- 84.51 m (Grodno 9 July 2008)

== Distance progression ==
- 2018 75.79 m Berlin 7 August 2018
- 2016 80.04 m Grodno 24 June 2016
- 2015 77.46 m Yerino 24 July 2015
- 2012 82.81 m Brest 25 May 2012
- 2008 84.51 m Grodno 9 July 2008
- 2007 83.63 m Osaka 27 August 2007
- 2006 81.12 m Stuttgart 10 September 2006
- 2004 84.46 m Minsk 7 May 2004
- 2003 84.32 m Minsk 8 August 2003
- 2002 79.04 m Minsk 29 June 2002
- 2001 78.73 m Brest 8 June 2001
- 2000 79.85 m Minsk 27 June 2000
- 1999 70.37 m 4 September 1999
- 1998 78.03 m Saint-Denis 4 June 1998
- 1997 77.46 m Turku 11 July 1997
- 1996 75.32 m Minsk 13 July 1996
- 1995 66.84 m 1 January 1995
- 1994 62.66 m 1 January 1994
- 1993 61.32 m 13 July 1993
- 1992 55.91 m 6 May 1992
