= Andrei Varantsou =

Belarusian hammer thrower

Andrei Varantsou (Belarusian: Андрэй Варанцоў; born 24 July 1975) is a male hammer thrower from Belarus. His personal best throw is 80.56 metres, achieved in June 2006 in Minsk.

== Doping ==
In 2013 Varantsou failed doping test. He received a life ban.

== Achievements ==
| Year | Competition | Venue | Position | Notes |
|---|---|---|---|---|
| 2001 | Summer Universiade | Beijing, PR China | 7th | |
| 2003 | Summer Universiade | Daegu, South Korea | 8th | |
| 2005 | World Championships | Helsinki, Finland | 27th | 69.71 m |
| 2006 | European Championships | Gothenburg, Sweden | 12th | |
