= Athletics at the 2013 Summer Universiade – Women's hammer throw =

The women's hammer throw event at the 2013 Summer Universiade was held on 10 July.

== Results ==
Rank	Athlete	Nationality	#1	#2	#3	#4	#5	#6	Result	Notes
1st place, gold medalist(s)	Jeneva McCall	United States	70.08	68.37	73.75	71.40	68.90	69.78	73.75	
2nd place, silver medalist(s)	Oksana Kondratyeva	Russia	69.42	69.24	70.43	70.75	72.22	69.85	72.22	
3rd place, bronze medalist(s)	Zalina Marghieva	Moldova	68.85	68.67	71.10	66.93	x	69.70	71.10	
4	Mariya Bespalova	Russia	69.20	x	x	18.65	x	x	69.20	
5	Bianca Perie	Romania	x	68.71	67.15	68.94	68.53	x	68.94	
6	Tereza Králová	Czech Republic	x	x	63.65	x	66.70	60.97	66.70	
7	Nikola Lomnická	Slovakia	63.36	x	60.73	61.08	65.78	x	65.78	
8	Julia Ratcliffe	New Zealand	x	64.76	x	x	65.17	x	65.17	
9	Micaela Mariani	Italy	59.13	58.58	62.74				62.74	
10	Iryna Novozhylova	Ukraine	60.22	x	62.04				62.04	
11	Wang Lu	China	59.87	61.33	61.49				61.49	
12	Johanna Salmela	Finland	58.38	61.03	60.61				61.03	
13	Jenny Ozorai	Hungary	58.04	56.12	x				58.04	
14	Alina Kastrova	Belarus	x	x	58.00				58.00	
15	Kristin Obrochta	Canada	51.85	55.15	56.76				56.76	
	Jillian Weir	Canada	x	x	x				NM	
