= Athletics at the 2020 Summer Olympics – Women's hammer throw =

Women's hammer throw at the Games of the XXXII Olympiad
- Olympic Athletics
- Venue: Japan National Stadium
- Dates: 1 August 2021 (qualifying); 3 August 2021 (final)
- Competitors: 31 from 21 nations
- Winning distance: 78.48 m

Medalists
1st place, gold medalist(s)		Anita Włodarczyk	Poland
2nd place, silver medalist(s)		Zheng Wang	China
3rd place, bronze medalist(s)		Malwina Kopron	Poland

The women's hammer throw event at the 2020 Summer Olympics took place on 1 and 3 August 2021 at the Japan National Stadium. Approximately 35 athletes competed; the exact number was dependent on how many nations use universality places to enter athletes in addition to the 32 qualifying through distance or ranking (no universality places were used in 2016).

== Summary ==
Since 2009, the dominant name in women's hammer throwing has been Anita Włodarczyk. She holds the world record and the top six throws in history. She is the defending two time Olympic Champion and the 2017 World Champion. She underwent knee surgery and took much of the 2019 and 2020 seasons off. In her absence, DeAnna Price won in 2019. Until June 26 of this year, Włodarczyk was the only woman to throw beyond 80 metres. Price became the second at the US Trials. The other two American qualifiers had moved up to the top six women in history, Brooke Andersen to #5 just in April. During the 2021 season, Włodarczyk was not showing the same form, throwing in the low 70's and losing multiple competitions. Four days after Price hit 80, Włodarczyk finally showed she still could do it, getting a 77.93m in Bydgoszcz. Other strong competitors included Włodarczyk's Polish teammates; Malwina Kopron and Joanna Fiodorow, both of whom had World Championship medals; and three time World Championship medalist Wang Zheng.

Włodarczyk made short work of qualifying, reaching her second best throw of the year, 76.99m, one and done. The only other thrower to reach automatic qualifying on their first attempt was Camryn Rogers. Wang, Andersen and Alexandra Tavernier took two attempts to reach automatic. None of the other qualifiers even made automatic. 71.68 made the top 12 and into the finals.

The finals got off to a lackluster start, Tavernier coming out of the round with the lead at 73.54m. In the second, Rogers moved up with 74.35m, then Wang took over with 75.30m. That lead lasted until Włodarczyk threw next in the ring, 76.01m was the answer. The third round eliminated two Americans, Andersen and Gwen Berry, with Price barely qualifying in eighth. Włodarczyk improved to 77.44m. The fourth round saw Włodarczyk improve again to 78.48 m (257 ft 5 in), which proved to be the winner. Kopron's fifth round 75.49m moved her into silver position. But Wang used her final effort to muscle out 77.03m to take the silver for good, leaving Kopron with the bronze. Włodarczyk's gold was her third consecutive, making her the first woman to achieve the feat in an athletics field event.

== Background ==
This was the 6th appearance of the event, having appeared in every Summer Olympics since 2000.

== Qualification ==
A National Olympic Committee (NOC) could enter up to 3 qualified athletes in the women's hammer throw event if all athletes meet the entry standard or qualify by ranking during the qualifying period. (The limit of 3 has been in place since the 1930 Olympic Congress.) The qualifying standard is 72.50 metres. This standard was "set for the sole purpose of qualifying athletes with exceptional performances unable to qualify through the IAAF World Rankings pathway." The world rankings, based on the average of the best five results for the athlete over the qualifying period and weighted by the importance of the meet, will then be used to qualify athletes until the cap of 32 is reached.

The qualifying period was originally from 1 May 2019 to 29 June 2020. Due to the COVID-19 pandemic, the period was suspended from 6 April 2020 to 30 November 2020, with the end date extended to 29 June 2021. The world rankings period start date was also changed from 1 May 2019 to 30 June 2020; athletes who had met the qualifying standard during that time were still qualified, but those using world rankings would not be able to count performances during that time. The qualifying time standards could be obtained in various meets during the given period that have the approval of the IAAF. Both outdoor and indoor meets are eligible. The most recent Area Championships may be counted in the ranking, even if not during the qualifying period.

NOCs can also use their universality place—each NOC can enter one female athlete regardless of time if they had no female athletes meeting the entry standard for an athletics event—in the hammer throw.

== Competition format ==
The 2020 competition continued to use the two-round format with divided final introduced in 1936. The qualifying round gave each competitor three throws to achieve a qualifying distance (73.50 metres); if fewer than 12 women did so, the top 12 would advance. The final provided each thrower with three throws; the top eight throwers received an additional three throws for a total of six, with the best to count (qualifying round throws were not considered for the final).

== Records ==
Prior to this competition, the existing world, Olympic, and area records were as follows.

World record	Anita Włodarczyk (POL)	82.98	Warsaw, Poland	28 August 2016
Olympic record	Anita Włodarczyk (POL)	82.29	Rio de Janeiro, Brazil	15 August 2016

Area	Distance (m)	Athlete	Nation
Africa (records)	75.49	Annette Echikunwoke	Nigeria
Asia (records)	77.68	Wang Zheng	China
Europe (records)	82.98 WR	Anita Włodarczyk	Poland
North, Central America and Caribbean (records)	80.31	DeAnna Price	United States
Oceania (records)	74.61	Lauren Bruce	New Zealand
South America (records)	73.74	Jennifer Dahlgren	Argentina

== Schedule ==
All times are Japan Standard Time (UTC+9)

The women's hammer throw took place over two separate days.

Date	Time	Round
Sunday, 1 August 2021	9:10	Qualifying
Tuesday, 3 August 2021	19:00	Final

== Results ==
=== Qualifying ===
Qualification rules: Qualifying performance 73.50 (Q) or at least 12 best performers (q) advance to the final.

Rank	Group	Athlete	Nation	1	2	3	Distance	Notes
1	A	Anita Włodarczyk	Poland	76.99	–	–	76.99	Q
2	B	Zheng Wang	China	71.69	74.29	–	74.29	Q, SB
3	A	Brooke Andersen	United States	71.32	74.00	–	74.00	Q
4	B	Camryn Rogers	Canada	73.97	–	–	73.97	Q
5	A	Alexandra Tavernier	France	72.34	73.51	–	73.51	Q
6	A	Julia Ratcliffe	New Zealand	73.20	68.89	70.87	73.20	q
7	B	Gwen Berry	United States	68.51	70.28	73.19	73.19	q
8	B	Malwina Kopron	Poland	73.06	x	x	73.06	q
9	B	DeAnna Price	United States	71.03	72.55	x	72.55	q
10	B	Joanna Fiodorow	Poland	72.32	x	x	72.32	q
11	B	Bianca Ghelber	Romania	69.78	70.80	71.72	71.72	q
12	A	Sara Fantini	Italy	71.68	69.26	69.27	71.68	q
13	A	Hanna Malyshchyk	Belarus	70.80	x	x	70.80	
14	B	Silja Kosonen	Finland	69.01	69.59	70.49	70.49	
15	A	Na Luo	China	69.86	69.62	x	69.86	
16	A	Hanna Skydan	Azerbaijan	67.93	x	69.57	69.57	
17	A	Zalina Petrivskaya	Moldova	69.29	x	67.86	69.29	
18	A	Stamatia Scarvelis	Greece	68.70	69.01	x	69.01	
19	A	Jillian Weir	Canada	68.55	x	68.68	68.68	
20	B	Laura Igaune	Latvia	68.35	68.53	66.89	68.53	
21	B	Iryna Klymets	Ukraine	66.63	x	68.29	68.29	
22	B	Rosa Rodríguez	Venezuela	x	67.25	68.23	68.23	
23	B	Lauren Bruce	New Zealand	67.71	66.01	66.15	67.71	
24	B	Samantha Borutta	Germany	57.00	67.38	66.47	67.38	
25	B	Martina Hrašnová	Slovakia	66.63	x	66.55	66.63	
26	A	Réka Gyurátz	Hungary	x	x	66.48	66.48	
27	A	Tuğçe Şahutoğlu	Turkey	64.23	66.06	65.66	66.06	
28	B	Nastassia Maslava	Belarus	60.52	x	65.15	65.15	
29	A	Laura Redondo Mora	Spain	x	x	62.42	62.42	
30	A	Iryna Novozhylova	Ukraine	x	58.77	59.85	59.85	
	A	Krista Tervo	Finland	x	x	x	—	NM

=== Final ===
Rank	Athlete	Nation	1	2	3	4	5	6	Distance	Notes
1st place, gold medalist(s)	Anita Włodarczyk	Poland	x	76.01	77.44	78.48	x	77.02	78.48	SB
2nd place, silver medalist(s)	Wang Zheng	China	73.21	75.30	x	71.09	x	77.03	77.03	SB
3rd place, bronze medalist(s)	Malwina Kopron	Poland	x	73.09	x	74.11	75.49	74.59	75.49	SB
4	Alexandra Tavernier	France	73.54	x	70.81	72.64	x	74.41	74.41	SB
5	Camryn Rogers	Canada	x	74.35	x	x	71.14	x	74.35	
6	Bianca Ghelber	Romania	70.15	x	74.18	70.32	71.70	x	74.18	PB
7	Joanna Fiodorow	Poland	x	73.09	73.46	x	73.83	x	73.83	SB
8	DeAnna Price	United States	x	72.87	x	72.69	x	73.09	73.09	
9	Julia Ratcliffe	New Zealand	72.61	72.69	71.79	did not advance			72.69	
10	Brooke Andersen	United States	72.16	x	x	did not advance			72.16	
11	Gwen Berry	United States	67.66	x	71.35	did not advance			71.35	
12	Sara Fantini	Italy	67.55	69.10	67.91	did not advance			69.10	
