= Athletics at the 2024 Summer Olympics – Women's hammer throw =

Women's hammer throw at the Games of the XXXIII Olympiad
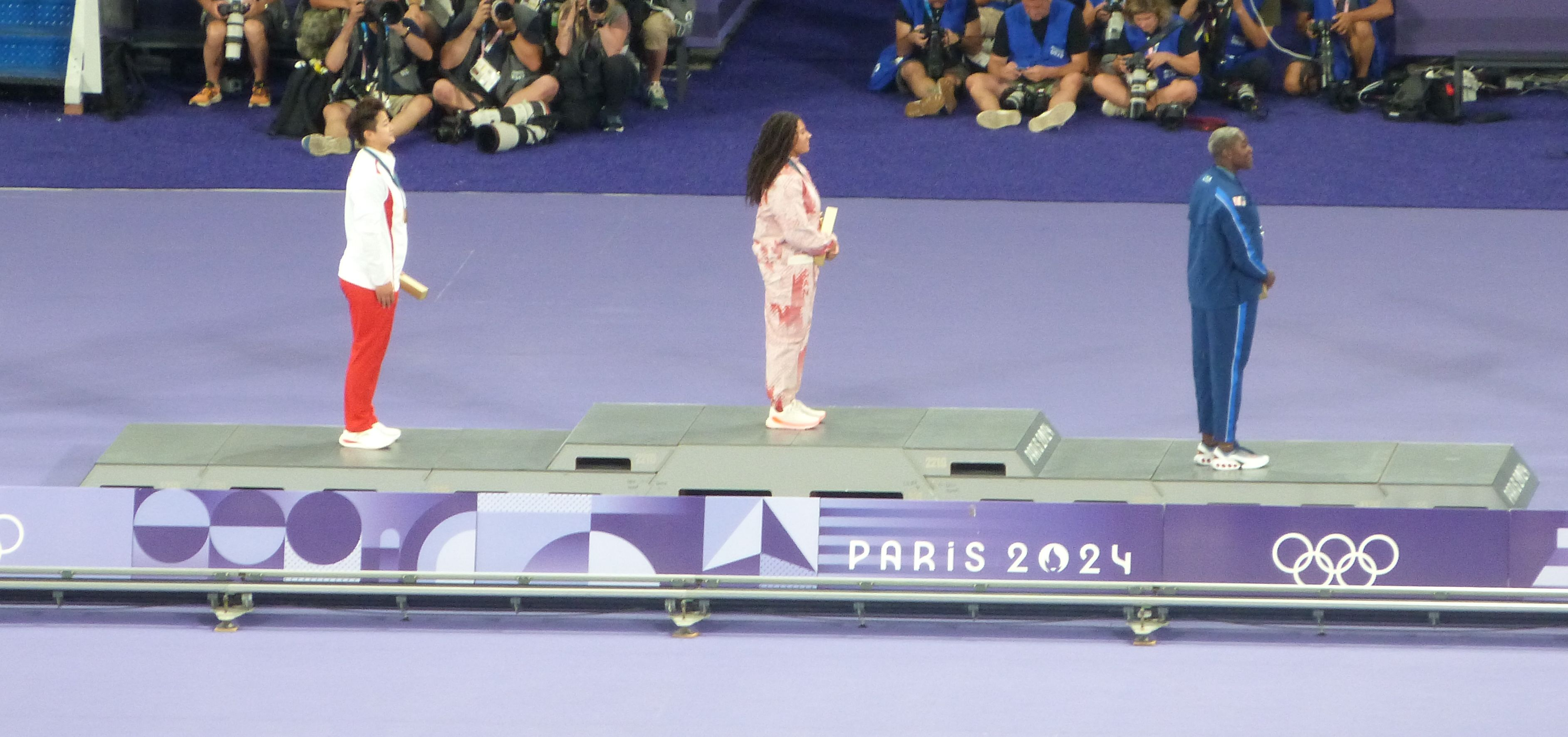
- The medal ceremony of the event.
- Venue: Stade de France, Paris, France
- Date: 4 August 2024 (qualification) 6 August 2024 (final)
- Winning distance: 76.97 m

Medalists
1st place, gold medalist(s)		Camryn Rogers	Canada
2nd place, silver medalist(s)		Annette Echikunwoke	United States
3rd place, bronze medalist(s)		Zhao Jie	China

The women's hammer throw at the 2024 Summer Olympics was held in Paris, France, on 4 and 6 August 2024. This was the 7th time that the event is contested at the Summer Olympics.

== Summary ==
World record holder, triple defending champion Anita Włodarczyk returned for a fourth. She turned 39 two days after competition. The rest of the podium Wang Zheng and Malwina Kopron were also back. World leader and #3 of all time Brooke Andersen would ordinarily be the favorite, but she could not land a fair throw at the US Trials and did not qualify. Anderson was the 2022 World Champion; the 2023 World Champion was Camryn Rogers who is also #2 on the world list, just ahead of 2019 World Champion, 2023 bronze medalist DeAnna Price.

Krista Tervo, Annette Echikunwoke, Katrine Koch Jacobsen, Rogers and Price were the auto qualifiers. Włodarczyk was the last qualifier for the final with 71.06m, her fifth final.

Zhao Jie started off the action with 72.20m. Rogers spun it out to 74.11m. Hanna Skydan moved into second with a 73.27m. Echikunwoke almost matched that with 73.11m. Włodarczyk proved she was still going to be a contender by throwing 73.17m. In the second round, Zhao took the lead with a throw of 74.27m. Silja Kosonen became the third over 74, though barely with a throw of 74.04m. In the third round Rogers took back the lead with a 74.47m. Five throws later, Echikunwoke pushed the competition a meter farther to 75.48m. In the fourth round, Rogers made it a lot closer, throwing 75.44m. It went to the fifth round, where Rogers got off the winner, 76.97 m (252 ft 6 in). Włodarczyk got off a 74.23m to just miss a fourth medal in a row. Along with Ethan Katzberg, Canada wins both hammer throw events at the Olympics.

== Background ==
The women's hammer throw has been present on the Olympic athletics programme since 2000.

Global records before the 2024 Summer Olympics
Record	Athlete (Nation)	Distance (m)	Location	Date
World record	Anita Włodarczyk (POL)	82.98	Warsaw, Poland	26 August 2016
Olympic record	Anita Włodarczyk (POL)	82.29	Rio de Janeiro, Brazil	15 August 2016
World leading	Brooke Andersen (USA)	79.92	Tucson, United States	20 April 2024

Area records before the 2024 Summer Olympics
Area Record	Athlete (Nation)	Distance (m)
Africa (records)	Annette Echikunwoke (NGR)	75.49
Asia (records)	Wang Zheng (CHN)	77.68
Europe (records)	Anita Włodarczyk (POL)	82.98 WR
North, Central America and Caribbean (records)	DeAnna Price (USA)	80.31
Oceania (records)	Lauren Bruce (NZL)	74.61
South America (records)	Jennifer Dahlgren (ARG)	73.74

== Qualification ==
For the women's hammer throw event, the qualification period was between 1 July 2023 and 30 June 2024. 32 athletes were able to qualify for the event, with a maximum of three athletes per nation, by throwing the entry standard of 74.00 m or further or by their World Athletics Ranking for this event.

== Results ==
=== Qualification ===
The qualification was held on 4 August, starting at 10:20 (UTC+2) for Group A and 11:45 (UTC+2) for Group B in the morning. 32 athletes qualified for the first round by qualification distance or world ranking.

Rank	Group	Athlete	Nation	1	2	3	Distance	Notes
1	B	Krista Tervo	Finland	x	74.79		74.79	Q, NR
2	A	Camryn Rogers	Canada	x	74.69	–	74.69	Q
3	B	DeAnna Price	United States	72.08	73.79	–	73.79	Q
4	A	Annette Echikunwoke	United States	73.52	–	–	73.52	Q
5	B	Katrine Koch Jacobsen	Denmark	72.36	x	73.04	73.04	Q
6	A	Hanna Skydan	Azerbaijan	69.58	69.04	72.55	72.55	q
7	A	Zhao Jie	China	70.78	72.49	72.24	72.49	q
8	B	Sara Fantini	Italy	72.40	69.93	71.08	72.40	q
9	B	Silja Kosonen	Finland	x	68.51	72.11	72.11	q
10	B	Rosa Rodríguez	Venezuela	x	67.28	71.76	71.76	q
11	A	Bianca Ghelber	Romania	71.42	x	71.34	71.42	q
12	B	Anita Włodarczyk	Poland	71.04	70.41	71.06	71.06	q
13	A	Li Jiangyan	China	x	70.54	x	70.54	
14	A	Erin Reese	United States	68.74	70.23	x	70.23	
15	A	Stephanie Ratcliffe	Australia	x	x	70.07	70.07	
16	B	Nicola Tuthill	Ireland	x	68.87	69.90	69.90	
17	B	Stamatia Scarvelis	Greece	69.38	66.86	x	69.38	
18	A	Thea Löfman	Sweden	64.13	68.92	69.12	69.12	
19	A	Rose Loga	France	68.94	63.10	x	68.94	
20	A	Lauren Bruce	New Zealand	x	67.03	68.93	68.93	
21	A	Suvi Koskinen	Finland	66.14	x	67.90	67.90	
22	B	Zalina Marghieva	Moldova	x	67.84	66.45	67.84	
23	A	Malwina Kopron	Poland	65.39	65.65	67.68	67.68	
24	B	Vanessa Sterckendries	Belgium	67.67	x	64.67	67.67	
25	A	Zahra Tatar	Algeria	66.06	66.99	66.90	66.99	
26	B	Iryna Klymets	Ukraine	66.95	66.61	65.70	66.95	
27	A	Beatrice Nedberge Llano	Norway	66.11	66.92	64.77	66.92	
28	B	Wang Zheng	China	66.92	x	x	66.92	
29	B	Oyesade Olatoye	Nigeria	x	64.36	66.41	66.41	
30	B	Réka Gyurátz	Hungary	x	64.77	63.86	64.77	
	A	Mayra Gaviria	Colombia	x	r	–	—	NM
	B	Alexandra Tavernier	France	x	x	x	—	NM

=== Final ===
The final was held on 6 August, starting at 20:00 (UTC+2) in the evening.

Rank	Athlete	Nation	1	2	3	4	5	6	Distance	Notes
1st place, gold medalist(s)	Camryn Rogers	Canada	74.11	x	74.47	75.44	76.97	x	76.97	
2nd place, silver medalist(s)	Annette Echikunwoke	United States	73.11	71.45	75.48	x	73.32	73.56	75.48	SB
3rd place, bronze medalist(s)	Zhao Jie	China	72.90	74.27	73.95	72.79	73.88	71.88	74.27	
4	Anita Włodarczyk	Poland	73.17	72.18	73.13	73.61	74.23	69.77	74.23	SB
5	Silja Kosonen	Finland	x	74.04	72.44	x	73.12	72.10	74.04	SB
6	Krista Tervo	Finland	x	73.83	x	72.56	71.25	x	73.83	
7	Hanna Skydan	Azerbaijan	73.27	72.48	71.39	73.66	72.91	73.27	73.66	SB
8	Rosa Rodríguez	Venezuela	71.02	72.98	x	71.22	70.85	x	72.98	SB
9	Bianca Ghelber	Romania	x	72.24	72.36	Did not advance			72.36	
10	Katrine Koch Jacobsen	Denmark	71.65	70.64	71.09	Did not advance			71.65	
11	DeAnna Price	United States	x	70.18	71.00	Did not advance			71.00	
12	Sara Fantini	Italy	69.20	69.58	x	Did not advance			69.58	
