= 2017 World Championships in Athletics – Women's hammer throw =

Women's hammer throw at the 2017 World Championships
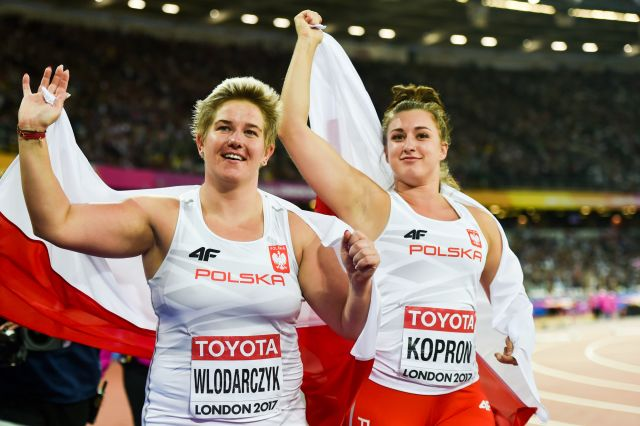
- The Polish gold and bronze medalists, Anita Włodarczyk and Malwina Kopron, during their lap of honour
- Venue: Olympic Stadium
- Dates: 5 August (qualification); 7 August (final)
- Competitors: 32 from 21 nations
- Winning distance: 77.90 m (255 ft 6 3/4 in)

Medalists
gold medal	Anita Włodarczyk	Poland
silver medal	Wang Zheng	China
bronze medal	Malwina Kopron	Poland

Video on YouTube Official Video

The women's hammer throw at the 2017 World Championships in Athletics was held at the Olympic Stadium on 5 and 7 August.

== Summary ==
As the only woman to have thrown over 80 metres, world record holder Anita Włodarczyk was the clear favourite. While she was the first to throw over 70 metres in this competition, the next thrower, the home team's Sophie Hitchon threw better. By the end of the round, four more women threw better, the early leader was Włodarczyk's Polish teammate Malwina Kopron with a throw of 74.46 metres. In the second round, Wang Zheng jumped from second to first with a throw of 75.94 metres. The third Pole in the competition Joanna Fiodorow moved into third place with a throw of 73.02 metres. In the third round, Fiodorow was displaced by Zhang Wenxiu, then three throwers later by Hanna Skydan with a throw of 73.38 metres. During that round, Włodarczyk had improved to 71.94 metres, but was in sixth place only 60 centimetres ahead of the last qualifying spot for the final three attempts. In the fourth round, Włodarczyk finally broke through getting off a throw of 77.39 metres to take the lead. Nobody would be able to improve upon that, but Włodarczyk wasn't done, throwing 77.90 metres in the fifth round. Wang threw her best of 75.98 metres on her final attempt but it couldn't catch Włodarczyk. Nobody else could beat Kopron's first round throw to get a medal.

== Records ==
Before the competition records were as follows:

Record	Perf.	Athlete	Nat.	Date	Location
World	82.98	Anita Włodarczyk	POL	28 Aug 2016	Warsaw, Poland
Championship	80.85	Anita Włodarczyk	POL	27 Aug 2015	Beijing, China
World leading	82.87	Anita Włodarczyk	POL	29 Jul 2017	Cetniewo, Poland
African	69.70	Amy Sène	SEN	25 May 2014	Forbach, France
Asian	77.68	Zheng Wang	CHN	29 Mar 2014	Chengdu, China
NACAC	76.77	Gwen Berry	USA	6 May 2017	Oxford, United States
South American	73.74	Jennifer Dahlgren	ARG	10 Apr 2010	Buenos Aires, Argentina
European	82.98	Anita Włodarczyk	POL	28 Aug 2016	Warsaw, Poland
Oceanian	71.12	Bronwyn Eagles	AUS	6 Feb 2003	Adelaide, Australia

No records were set at the competition.

== Qualification standard ==
The standard to qualify automatically for entry was 71.00 metres.

== Schedule ==
The event schedule, in local time (UTC+1), was as follows:

Date	Time	Round
5 August	11:35	Qualification
7 August	20:00	Final

== Results ==
=== Qualification ===
The qualification round took place on 5 August, in two groups, with Group A starting at 10:34 and Group B starting at 12:06. Athletes attaining a mark of at least 71.50 metres ( Q ) or at least the 12 best performers ( q ) qualified for the final. The overall results were as follows:

Rank	Group	Name	Nationality	Round			Mark	Notes
Rank	Group	Name	Nationality	1	2	3	Mark	Notes
1	A	Malwina Kopron	Poland	74.97			74.97	Q
2	B	Anita Włodarczyk	Poland	74.61			74.61	Q
3	A	Sophie Hitchon	Great Britain & N.I.	73.05			73.05	Q
4	A	Hanna Malyshchyk	Belarus	72.79			72.79	Q
5	B	DeAnna Price	United States	x	72.78		72.78	Q
6	B	Alexandra Tavernier	France	72.69			72.69	Q, SB
7	A	Wang Zheng	China	71.89			71.89	Q
8	B	Hanna Skydan	Azerbaijan	71.78			71.78	Q
9	B	Joanna Fiodorow	Poland	71.72			71.72	Q
10	B	Zhang Wenxiu	China	71.39	70.37	70.87	71.39	q
11	A	Kateřina Šafránková	Czech Republic	67.93	x	70.67	70.67	q
12	B	Kathrin Klaas	Germany	69.22	x	70.33	70.33	q
13	B	Luo Na	China	x	69.54	69.37	69.54	
14	A	Gwen Berry	United States	65.09	69.12	x	69.12	
15	A	Kivilcim Kaya	Turkey	66.33	67.76	66.93	67.76	
16	B	Réka Gyurátz	Hungary	x	67.48	60.93	67.48	
17	A	Ida Storm	Sweden	67.39	x	x	67.39	
18	B	Anna Maria Orel	Estonia	64.80	62.80	67.37	67.37	
19	A	Zalina Petrivskaya	Moldova	x	x	67.05	67.05	
20	B	Marinda Petersson	Sweden	63.11	66.46	xx	66.46	
21	B	Magdalyn Ewen	United States	x	66.24	65.14	66.24	
22	A	Berta Castells	Spain	63.09	66.11	66.05	66.11	
23	A	Iryna Novozhylova	Ukraine	65.78	66.02	65.52	66.02	
24	A	Bianca Perie-Ghelber	Romania	65.07	x	x	65.07	
25	A	Alyona Shamotina	Ukraine	62.63	64.03	64.88	64.88	
26	A	Julia Ratcliffe	New Zealand	64.67	64.72	61.88	64.72	
27	B	Marina Nikişenko	Moldova	63.72	62.92	64.63	64.63	
28	A	Nikola Lomnická	Slovakia	64.60	x	63.32	64.60	
29	B	Iryna Klymets	Ukraine	61.24	64.20	60.76	64.20	
30	A	Susen Küster	Germany	59.33	62.33	x	62.33	
	B	Jillian Weir	Canada	x	x	x	NM	
	B	Jennifer Dahlgren	Argentina	x	x	x	NM	

=== Final ===
The final took place on 7 August at 18:59. The results were as follows:

Rank	Name	Nationality	Round						Mark	Notes
Rank	Name	Nationality	1	2	3	4	5	6	Mark	Notes
1st place, gold medalist(s)	Anita Włodarczyk	Poland	70.45	x	71.94	77.39	77.90	73.91	77.90	
2nd place, silver medalist(s)	Wang Zheng	China	74.31	75.94	75.00	74.86	74.52	75.98	75.98	
3rd place, bronze medalist(s)	Malwina Kopron	Poland	74.76	x	x	x	69.90	71.66	74.76	
4	Zhang Wenxiu	China	69.70	x	73.19	70.62	74.53	72.21	74.53	SB
5	Hanna Skydan	Azerbaijan	72.45	72.38	73.38	71.70	x	71.77	73.38	
6	Joanna Fiodorow	Poland	x	73.02	72.41	73.04	71.69	72.67	73.04	
7	Sophie Hitchon	Great Britain & N.I.	71.47	71.62	71.80	x	70.81	72.32	72.32	
8	Kateřina Šafránková	Czech Republic	71.34	x	x	x	x	66.26	71.34	SB
9	DeAnna Price	United States	65.20	67.46	70.04				70.04	
10	Hanna Malyshchyk	Belarus	69.43	x	69.00				69.43	
11	Kathrin Klaas	Germany	67.83	68.91	x				68.91	
12	Alexandra Tavernier	France	x	66.31	66.01				66.31	
