= 2018 European Athletics Championships – Women's hammer throw =

Women's hammer throw at the 2018 European Athletics Championships
- Venue: Olympic Stadium
- Location: Berlin
- Dates: August 10 (qualification); August 12 (final)
- Competitors: 28 from 20 nations
- Winning result: 78.94

Medalists
gold medal	Anita Włodarczyk	Poland
silver medal	Alexandra Tavernier	France
bronze medal	Joanna Fiodorow	Poland

The women's hammer throw at the 2018 European Athletics Championships took place at the Olympic Stadium on 10 and 12 August.

== Records ==
Standing records prior to the 2018 European Athletics Championships
World record	Anita Włodarczyk (POL)	82.98 m	Warsaw, Poland	28 August 2016
European record	Anita Włodarczyk (POL)	82.98 m	Warsaw, Poland	28 August 2016
Championship record	Anita Włodarczyk (POL)	78.76 m	Zürich, Switzerland	15 August 2014
World Leading	Anita Włodarczyk (POL)	79.59 m	Lublin, Poland	22 July 2018
European Leading	Anita Włodarczyk (POL)	79.59 m	Lublin, Poland	22 July 2018
Broken records during the 2018 European Athletics Championships
Championship record	Anita Włodarczyk (POL)	78.94 m	Berlin, Germany	12 August 2018

== Schedule ==
Date	Time	Round
10 August 2018	10:00	Qualification
12 August 2018	19:30	Final

All times are local times (UTC+2)

== Results ==
=== Qualification ===
Qualification: 70.00 m (Q) or best 12 performers (q)

Rank	Group	Name	Nationality	#1	#2	#3	Result	Note
1	B	Anita Włodarczyk	Poland	69.81	75.10		75.10	Q
2	B	Hanna Skydan	Azerbaijan	74.02			74.02	Q, SB
3	B	Alexandra Tavernier	France	72.88			72.88	Q
4	A	Hanna Malyshchyk	Belarus	72.39			72.39	Q
5	A	Joanna Fiodorow	Poland	71.46			71.46	Q
6	B	Malwina Kopron	Poland	x	71.14		71.14	Q
7	B	Sofiya Palkina	Authorised Neutral Athletes	69.21	69.74	69.49	69.74	q
8	B	Réka Gyurátz	Hungary	x	69.45	–	69.45	q
9	B	Iryna Klymets	Ukraine	68.40	x	69.44	69.44	q
10	A	Zalina Petrivskaya	Moldova	x	69.17	69.04	69.17	q
11	B	Sophie Hitchon	Great Britain	x	68.69	x	68.69	q
12	A	Kathrin Klaas	Germany	66.12	68.64	x	68.64	q
13	A	Yelizaveta Tsareva	Authorised Neutral Athletes	67.40	66.50	68.35	68.35	
14	B	Kıvılcım Kaya	Turkey	67.72	66.86	68.10	68.10	
15	A	Stamatia Skarvelis	Greece	67.08	67.97	x	67.97	
16	B	Anna Maria Orel	Estonia	67.22	64.14	65.17	67.22	
17	B	Ida Storm	Sweden	64.52	65.22	66.66	66.66	
18	A	Martina Hrašnová	Slovakia	x	x	66.37	66.37	
19	A	Bianca Perie-Ghelber	Romania	x	65.77	66.17	66.17	
20	A	Inga Linna	Finland	63.11	63.77	65.46	65.46	
21	B	Krista Tervo	Finland	61.39	65.37	x	65.37	
22	A	Kateřina Šafránková	Czech Republic	x	64.64	64.85	64.85	
23	A	Iryna Novozhylova	Ukraine	x	64.70	x	64.70	
24	B	Marina Nichișenco	Moldova	x	62.22	64.37	64.37	
25	A	Anamari Kožul	Croatia	x	62.55	60.40	62.55	
26	B	Nicole Zihlmann	Switzerland	60.64	x	61.67	61.67	
27	A	Alyona Shamotina	Ukraine	x	61.51	61.66	61.66	
28	A	Éva Orbán	Hungary	x	x	59.16	59.16	

=== Final ===
Rank	Athlete	Nationality	#1	#2	#3	#4	#5	#6	Result	Notes
1st place, gold medalist(s)	Anita Włodarczyk	Poland	69.35	76.50	77.82	78.94	78.55	77.71	78.94	CR
2nd place, silver medalist(s)	Alexandra Tavernier	France	74.78	69.49	70.74	68.35	73.92	74.20	74.78	NR
3rd place, bronze medalist(s)	Joanna Fiodorow	Poland	69.55	71.41	74.00	73.72	71.70	x	74.00	
4	Malwina Kopron	Poland	x	x	72.20	71.53	x	x	72.20	
5	Hanna Skydan	Azerbaijan	x	67.22	71.92	68.55	71.42	72.10	72.10	
6	Zalina Petrivskaya	Moldova	70.98	70.65	71.80	70.53	71.00	x	71.80	
7	Kathrin Klaas	Germany	x	66.49	70.66	x	71.50	x	71.50	SB
8	Sophie Hitchon	United Kingdom	68.80	x	70.52	x	x	x	70.52	
9	Réka Gyurátz	Hungary	69.51	70.48	69.85				70.48	
10	Sofiya Palkina	Authorised Neutral Athletes	68.64	x	67.46				68.64	
11	Iryna Klymets	Ukraine	x	66.42	68.11				68.11	
	Hanna Malyshchyk	Belarus	x	x	x				NM	
