= Athletics at the 2011 Summer Universiade – Women's hammer throw =

The women's hammer throw event at the 2011 Summer Universiade was held on 17–19 August.

== Medalists ==
Gold	Silver	Bronze
Zalina Marghieva; Moldova	Éva Orbán; Hungary	Bianca Perie; Romania

== Results ==
=== Qualification ===
Qualification: 65.00 m (Q) or at least 12 best (q) qualified for the final.

Rank	Group	Athlete	Nationality	#1	#2	#3	Result	Notes
1	B	Éva Orbán	Hungary	68.63			68.63	Q
2	A	Zalina Marghieva	Moldova	x	67.84		67.84	Q
3	A	Oksana Kondrateva	Russia	x	63.88	66.99	66.99	Q
4	B	Joanna Fiodorow	Poland	64.28	66.07		66.07	Q
5	B	Elisa Palmieri	Italy	62.01	62.73	65.70	65.70	Q
6	A	Kateřina Šafránková	Czech Republic	65.63			65.63	Q
7	A	Hao Shuai	China	65.62			65.62	Q
8	B	Marina Marghieva	Moldova	65.48			65.48	Q
9	A	Bianca Perie	Romania	65.38			65.38	Q
10	A	Heather Steacy	Canada	63.03	63.85	x	63.85	q
11	B	Gabi Wolfarth	Germany	x	62.66	63.34	63.34	q
12	B	Ana Sušec	Slovenia	62.41	61.16	62.89	62.89	q
13	A	Jenny Ozorai	Hungary	62.63	62.02	62.65	62.65	
14	B	Maria Bespalova	Russia	61.50	62.28	x	62.28	
15	A	Lena Solvin	Finland	60.23	x	61.84	61.84	
16	B	Jessika Guehaseim	France	58.26	61.51	x	61.51	
17	B	Liu Jingnan	China	57.64	59.58	61.49	61.49	PB
18	A	Josefin Berg	Sweden	58.82	59.48	x	59.48	SB
19	B	Rana Ibrahim	Egypt	58.26	x	56.26	58.26	
20	A	Katja Vangsnes	Norway	53.71	54.72	57.83	57.83	
21	A	Tan Song Hwa	Malaysia	56.04	56.92	x	56.92	
22	B	Linda Oseso	Kenya	56.85	x	x	56.85	

=== Final ===
Rank	Athlete	Nationality	#1	#2	#3	#4	#5	#6	Result	Notes
1st place, gold medalist(s)	Zalina Marghieva	Moldova	70.69	72.93	69.76	x	x	x	72.93	NR
2nd place, silver medalist(s)	Éva Orbán	Hungary	71.33	x	69.85	x	67.64	x	71.33	NR
3rd place, bronze medalist(s)	Bianca Perie	Romania	69.80	x	71.18	67.62	x	x	71.18	
4	Hao Shuai	China	65.35	66.84	67.93	x	69.37	66.48	69.37	PB
5	Heather Steacy	Canada	66.71	x	x	x	67.72	65.48	67.72	
6	Oksana Kondrateva	Russia	67.40	64.89	66.91	66.25	66.90	65.46	67.40	
7	Kateřina Šafránková	Czech Republic	66.38	x	66.78	x	x	67.18	67.18	
8	Marina Marghieva	Moldova	x	64.50	x	x	65.83	65.48	65.83	
9	Joanna Fiodorow	Poland	63.40	x	61.72				63.40	
10	Elisa Palmieri	Italy	63.06	62.08	62.15				63.06	
11	Ana Sušec	Slovenia	62.13	62.90	61.34				62.90	SB
12	Gabi Wolfarth	Germany	61.81	62.81	60.68				62.81	
