= 2011 European Athletics U23 Championships – Women's hammer throw =

The Women's hammer throw event at the 2011 European Athletics U23 Championships was held in Ostrava, Czech Republic, at Městský stadion on 15 and 16 July.

== Medalists ==
Gold	Bianca Perie; Romania
Silver	Joanna Fiodorow; Poland
Bronze	Sophie Hitchon; United Kingdom

== Results ==
=== Final ===
16 July 2011 / 15:25

Rank	Name	Nationality	Attempts						Result	Notes
Rank	Name	Nationality	1	2	3	4	5	6	Result	Notes
1st place, gold medalist(s)	Bianca Perie	Romania	67.83	70.57	69.38	71.59	69.60	68.61	71.59	CR
2nd place, silver medalist(s)	Joanna Fiodorow	Poland	65.87	x	70.06	68.64	67.28	x	70.06	PB
3rd place, bronze medalist(s)	Sophie Hitchon	United Kingdom	67.95	69.59	x	63.13	68.68	67.77	69.59	NR
4	Kateřina Šafránková	Czech Republic	x	67.37	x	67.71	67.94	66.58	67.94	
5	Jessika Guehaseim	France	67.09	x	65.57	66.86	64.40	64.61	67.09	
6	Alina Kastrova	Belarus	65.09	x	61.91	x	62.14	x	65.09	
7	Tereza Králová	Czech Republic	64.73	62.58	x	x	x	65.05	65.05	
8	Jenny Ozorai	Hungary	62.66	63.44	63.48	x	x	x	63.48	
9	Gabi Wolfarth	Germany	63.30	x	61.51				63.30	
10	Trude Raad	Norway	62.73	x	60.56				62.73	PB
11	Jenni Penttilä	Finland	58.62	58.25	61.53				61.53	
12	Magdalena Szewa	Poland	59.06	60.40	60.52				60.52	

=== Qualifications ===
Qualified: qualifying perf. 63.00 (Q) or 12 best performers (q) to the advance to the Final

==== Summary ====
Rank	Name	Nationality	Result	Notes
1	Bianca Perie	Romania	69.91	Q
2	Joanna Fiodorow	Poland	68.97	Q PB
3	Kateřina Šafránková	Czech Republic	66.55	Q
4	Tereza Králová	Czech Republic	66.44	Q
5	Sophie Hitchon	United Kingdom	66.02	Q
6	Jessika Guehaseim	France	65.75	Q
7	Trude Raad	Norway	63.43	Q PB
8	Gabi Wolfarth	Germany	62.66	q
9	Jenni Penttilä	Finland	62.44	q
10	Alina Kastrova	Belarus	62.16	q
11	Jenny Ozorai	Hungary	61.72	q
12	Magdalena Szewa	Poland	61.13	q
13	Natallia Shayunova	Belarus	60.84	
14	Kristýna Kroužková	Czech Republic	60.75	
15	Johanna Salmela	Finland	60.52	
16	Jonna Miettinen	Finland	60.49	
17	Katja Vangsnes	Norway	60.19	
18	Ida Storm	Sweden	59.60	
19	Cintia Gergelics	Hungary	59.60	
20	Tatiana Massamba	France	52.79	

==== Details ====
===== Group A =====
15 July 2011 / 10:00

Rank	Name	Nationality	Attempts			Result	Notes
Rank	Name	Nationality	1	2	3	Result	Notes
1	Joanna Fiodorow	Poland	68.97			68.97	Q PB
2	Kateřina Šafránková	Czech Republic	66.55			66.55	Q
3	Tereza Králová	Czech Republic	66.44			66.44	Q
4	Sophie Hitchon	United Kingdom	x	66.02		66.02	Q
5	Jenni Penttilä	Finland	61.68	62.44	59.38	62.44	q
6	Natallia Shayunova	Belarus	x	60.84	60.18	60.84	
7	Johanna Salmela	Finland	x	60.52	x	60.52	
8	Katja Vangsnes	Norway	58.05	60.19	x	60.19	
9	Cintia Gergelics	Hungary	56.05	x	59.60	59.60	
10	Tatiana Massamba	France	52.79	x	x	52.79	

===== Group B =====
15 July 2011 / 11:05

Rank	Name	Nationality	Attempts			Result	Notes
Rank	Name	Nationality	1	2	3	Result	Notes
1	Bianca Perie	Romania	69.91			69.91	Q
2	Jessika Guehaseim	France	62.34	65.75		65.75	Q
3	Trude Raad	Norway	62.35	63.43		63.43	Q PB
4	Gabi Wolfarth	Germany	62.34	x	62.66	62.66	q
5	Alina Kastrova	Belarus	x	60.56	62.16	62.16	q
6	Jenny Ozorai	Hungary	61.72	x	60.78	61.72	q
7	Magdalena Szewa	Poland	x	58.15	61.13	61.13	q
8	Kristýna Kroužková	Czech Republic	60.75	x	x	60.75	
9	Jonna Miettinen	Finland	59.68	60.15	60.49	60.49	
10	Ida Storm	Sweden	59.60	57.63	56.80	59.60	

== Participation ==
According to an unofficial count, 20 athletes from 11 countries participated in the event.

- Belarus (2)
- Czech Republic (3)
- Finland (3)
- France (2)
- Germany (1)
- Hungary (2)
- Norway (2)
- Poland (2)
- Romania (1)
- Sweden (1)
- United Kingdom (1)
