= 2019 World Athletics Championships – Women's hammer throw =

Women's hammer throw at the 2019 World Championships
- Venue: Khalifa International Stadium
- Dates: 27 September (qualification); 28 September (final)
- Competitors: 30 from 20 nations
- Winning distance: 77.54

Medalists
gold medal	DeAnna Price	United States
silver medal	Joanna Fiodorow	Poland
bronze medal	Wang Zheng	China

Video on YouTube Official Video

The women's hammer throw at the 2019 World Athletics Championships was held at the Khalifa International Stadium in Doha from 27 to 28 September 2019.

== Summary ==
In the absence of world record holder Anita Włodarczyk, who has dominated hammer throwing since 2012, this was the first major championship opportunity for someone else. With the defending champion recovering from knee surgery, world leader DeAnna Price seized the opportunity on the second throw of the competition with a 76.87m that nobody would beat all day, except Price, who threw her best of 77.54 m (254 ft 4 in) in the third round. The next thrower into the ring was Włodarczyk's Polish teammate Joanna Fiodorow, who tried to pick up the slack, throwing her personal best 76.35m which dominated everybody else. Zalina Petrivskaya's first throw of the competition was dropped to third place after the first three throwers. She maintained that position until the middle of the fifth round when Wang Zheng's 74.76m grabbed bronze.

== Records ==
Before the competition records were as follows:

World record	Anita Włodarczyk (POL)	82.98 m	Warsaw, Poland	28 August 2016
Championship record	Anita Włodarczyk (POL)	80.85 m	Beijing, China	27 August 2015
World Leading	DeAnna Price (USA)	78.24 m	Des Moines, United States	27 July 2019
African Record	Amy Sene (SEN)	69.70 m	Forbach, France	25 May 2014
Asian Record	Wang Zheng (CHN)	77.68 m	Chengdu, China	29 March 2014
North, Central American and Caribbean record	DeAnna Price (USA)	78.24 m	Des Moines, United States	27 July 2019
South American Record	Jennifer Dahlgren (ARG)	73.74 m	Buenos Aires, Argentina	10 April 2010
European Record	Anita Włodarczyk (POL)	82.98 m	Warsaw, Poland	28 August 2016
Oceanian record	Julia Ratcliffe (NZL)	71.39 m	Townsville, Australia	28 June 2019

== Qualification standard ==
The standard to qualify automatically for entry was 71.00 m.

== Schedule ==
The event schedule, in local time (UTC+3), was as follows:

Date	Time	Round
27 September	16:40	Qualification
28 September	19:25	Final

== Results ==
=== Qualification ===
Qualification: Qualifying Performance 72.00 (Q) or at least 12 best performers (q) advanced to the final.

Rank	Group	Name	Nationality	Round			Mark	Notes
Rank	Group	Name	Nationality	1	2	3	Mark	Notes
1	B	DeAnna Price	United States	73.77			73.77	Q
2	B	Zalina Petrivskaya	Moldova	73.40			73.40	Q
3	A	Joanna Fiodorow	Poland	73.39			73.39	Q
4	B	Hanna Skydan	Azerbaijan	x	70.86	73.32	73.32	Q, SB
5	A	Iryna Klymets	Ukraine	71.51	72.93		72.93	Q, PB
6	A	Alexandra Tavernier	France	72.91			72.91	Q
7	B	Wang Zheng	China	72.65			72.65	Q
8	A	Hanna Malyshik	Belarus	71.42	71.03	72.59	72.59	Q
9	B	Martina Hrašnová	Slovakia	71.85	72.01		72.01	Q
10	A	Gwen Berry	United States	x	71.72	x	71.72	q
11	B	Alena Sobaleva	Belarus	70.26	70.28	71.52	71.52	q, SB
12	A	Luo Na	China	71.35	71.12	x	71.35	q
13	B	Malwina Kopron	Poland	x	x	70.46	70.46	
14	A	Julia Ratcliffe	New Zealand	67.07	70.45	68.21	70.45	
15	B	Yelizaveta Tsareva	Authorised Neutral Athletes	70.35	68.40	67.54	70.35	
16	B	Anastasya Kalamoyets	Belarus	x	x	69.67	69.67	
17	A	Stamatia Scarvelis	Greece	66.53	67.82	69.65	69.65	
18	B	Bianca Florentina Ghelber	Romania	68.01	68.65	x	68.65	
19	A	Sofiya Palkina	Authorised Neutral Athletes	67.53	68.53	67.26	68.53	
20	A	Brooke Andersen	United States	66.73	68.46	x	68.46	
21	B	Krista Tervo	Finland	x	66.47	68.25	68.25	
22	B	Laura Igaune	Latvia	67.14	67.77	66.39	67.77	
23	B	Réka Gyurátz	Hungary	67.28	67.41	x	67.41	
24	B	Alona Shamotina	Ukraine	64.14	67.30	x	67.30	
25	A	Liu Tingting	China	x	66.91	67.11	67.11	
26	A	Sara Fantini	Italy	65.15	66.58	x	66.58	
27	A	Barbara Špiler	Slovenia	65.55	x	65.76	65.76	
28	A	Beatrice Nedberge Llano	Norway	65.55	64.51	65.51	65.55	
29	B	Kateřina Šafránková	Czech Republic	62.65	63.55	65.46	65.46	
30	A	Iryna Novozhylova	Ukraine	60.66	65.31	63.63	65.31	

=== Final ===
The final was started on 28 September at 19:25.

Rank	Name	Nationality	Round						Mark	Notes
Rank	Name	Nationality	1	2	3	4	5	6	Mark	Notes
1st place, gold medalist(s)	DeAnna Price	United States	76.87	x	77.54	74.56	73.77	75.68	77.54	
2nd place, silver medalist(s)	Joanna Fiodorow	Poland	76.35	74.77	72.78	74.69	x	x	76.35	PB
3rd place, bronze medalist(s)	Wang Zheng	China	72.94	x	x	73.75	74.76	x	74.76	
4	Zalina Petrivskaya	Moldova	73.73	73.60	74.33	70.49	74.27	72.94	74.33	
5	Iryna Klymets	Ukraine	73.17	73.56	x	70.26	72.59	71.95	73.56	PB
6	Alexandra Tavernier	France	71.50	70.48	73.31	72.24	73.33	x	73.33	
7	Hanna Skydan	Azerbaijan	70.69	71.99	72.80	72.83	71.44	70.99	72.83	
8	Luo Na	China	71.33	72.04	70.83	70.41	71.03	x	72.04	
9	Martina Hrašnová	Slovakia	66.09	71.28	x				71.28	
10	Hanna Malyshik	Belarus	71.24	66.52	70.12				71.24	
11	Alena Sobaleva	Belarus	70.45	x	68.65				70.45	
	Gwen Berry	United States	x	x	x				NM	
