= 2015 European Athletics U23 Championships – Women's hammer throw =

The women's hammer throw event at the 2015 European Athletics U23 Championships was held in Tallinn, Estonia, at Kadriorg Stadium on 10 and 11 July.

== Medalists ==
Gold	Alexandra Tavernier; France
Silver	Alena Sobaleva; Belarus
Bronze	Malwina Kopron; Poland

== Results ==
=== Final ===
11 July

Rank	Name	Nationality	Attempts						Result	Notes
Rank	Name	Nationality	1	2	3	4	5	6	Result	Notes
1st place, gold medalist(s)	Alexandra Tavernier	France	71.68	70.12	71.77	69.56	69.91	72.50	72.50	
2nd place, silver medalist(s)	Alena Sobaleva	Belarus	x	x	67.98	70.00	70.13	71.20	71.20	
3rd place, bronze medalist(s)	Malwina Kopron	Poland	65.09	68.00	63.36	68.57	67.92	68.48	68.57	
4	Alexia Sedykh	France	65.38	66.41	67.37	65.77	x	64.10	67.37	
5	Fruzsina Fertig	Hungary	65.73	x	64.98	x	62.67	63.22	65.73	
6	Charlene Woitha	Germany	62.75	64.11	64.34	63.31	63.50	x	64.34	
7	Iryna Klymets	Ukraine	62.71	64.28	62.19	63.15	x	60.58	64.28	
8	Yelizaveta Tsareva	Russia	63.47	62.60	60.95	x	61.97	x	63.47	
9	Alyona Shamotina	Ukraine	61.82	x	x				61.82	
10	Bianca Lazăr	Romania	59.59	61.05	61.45				61.45	
11	Eleni Larsson	Sweden	x	60.99	x				60.99	
12	Inga Linna	Finland	59.50	60.73	60.39				60.73	

=== Qualifications ===
10 July

Rank	Name	Nationality	Attempts			Result	Notes
Rank	Name	Nationality	1	2	3	Result	Notes
1	Alexandra Tavernier	France	72.98			72.98	Q
2	Alena Sobaleva	Belarus	70.53			70.53	Q
3	Fruzsina Fertig	Hungary	67.34	–	–	67.34	q
4	Alexia Sedykh	France	63.54	65.37	66.38	66.38	q
5	Eleni Larsson	Sweden	x	x	65.66	65.66	q
6	Alyona Shamotina	Ukraine	62.49	65.15	65.34	65.34	q
7	Malwina Kopron	Poland	65.01	x	x	65.01	q
8	Bianca Lazăr	Romania	62.58	61.65	64.78	64.78	PB q
9	Charlene Woitha	Germany	x	64.56	64.72	64.72	q
10	Yelizaveta Tsareva	Russia	64.25	62.51	61.34	64.25	q
11	Iryna Klymets	Ukraine	60.70	64.12	60.34	64.12	q
12	Inga Linna	Finland	60.50	63.70	63.37	63.70	q
13	Nastassia Kalamoyets	Belarus	63.64	59.68	x	63.64	
14	Jolien Boumkwo	Belgium	x	53.74	63.24	63.24	
15	Iliána Korosídou	Greece	61.46	62.88	63.13	63.13	
16	Marinda Petersson	Sweden	61.45	59.09	62.19	62.19	
17	Veronika Kaňuchová	Slovakia	55.99	x	62.19	62.19	
18	Rachel Hunter	United Kingdom	x	59.74	61.16	61.16	
19	Celina Julin	Denmark	x	59.89	60.14	60.14	
20	Milja Jylhänniska	Finland	56.76	60.01	59.44	60.01	
21	Sara Savatović	Serbia	56.23	x	58.38	58.38	
22	Beatrix Banga	Hungary	54.26	54.09	58.24	58.24	
23	Catherine Beatty	Cyprus	57.72	56.72	x	57.72	
24	Heli Rinnekari	Finland	57.02	x	57.68	57.68	
25	Claudia Štravs	Slovenia	56.71	57.02	57.56	57.56	
26	Ksenia Safonova	Estonia	x	47.15	x	47.15	

== Participation ==
According to an unofficial count, 26 athletes from 19 countries participated in the event.

- Belarus (2)
- Belgium (1)
- Cyprus (1)
- Denmark (1)
- Estonia (1)
- Finland (3)
- France (2)
- Germany (1)
- Greece (1)
- Hungary (2)
- Poland (1)
- Romania (1)
- Russia (1)
- Serbia (1)
- Slovakia (1)
- Slovenia (1)
- Sweden (2)
- Ukraine (2)
- United Kingdom (1)
