= 2022 European Athletics Championships – Women's hammer throw =

Women's hammer throw at the 2022 European Athletics Championships
- Venue: Olympiastadion
- Location: Munich
- Dates: August 16 (qualification); August 17 (final)
- Competitors: 26 from 19 nations
- Winning distance: 72.72

Medalists
gold medal	Bianca Ghelber	Romania
silver medal	Ewa Różańska	Poland
bronze medal	Sara Fantini	Italy

The women's hammer throw at the 2022 European Athletics Championships took place at the Olympiastadion on 16 and 17 August.

== Records ==
Standing records prior to the 2022 European Athletics Championships
World record	Anita Włodarczyk (POL)	82.98 m	Warsaw, Poland	28 August 2016
European record	Anita Włodarczyk (POL)	82.98 m	Warsaw, Poland	28 August 2016
Championship record	Anita Włodarczyk (POL)	78.94 m	Berlin, Germany	18 August 2018
World Leading	Brooke Andersen (USA)	79.02 m	Tucson, United States	30 April 2022
Europe Leading	Anita Włodarczyk (POL)	78.06 m	Nairobi, Kenya	7 May 2022

== Schedule ==
Date	Time	Round
16 August 2022	12:15	Qualification
17 August 2022	21:00	Final

All times are local times (UTC+2)

== Results ==
=== Qualification ===
Qualification: 72.50 m (Q) or best 12 performers (q)

Rank	Group	Name	Nationality	#1	#2	#3	Result	Note
1	A	Hanna Skydan	Azerbaijan	70.18	74.57		74.57	Q, SB
2	A	Sara Fantini	Italy	73.40			73.40	Q
3	B	Bianca Ghelber	Romania	70.24	71.27	69.31	71.27	q
4	A	Alexandra Tavernier	France	68.85	68.99	67.41	68.99	q
5	A	Grete Ahlberg	Sweden	66.47	68.73	65.62	68.73	q
6	A	Réka Gyurátz	Hungary	68.63	65.96	x	68.63	q
7	A	Katrine Koch Jacobsen	Denmark	x	68.25	68.26	68.26	q
8	B	Ewa Różańska	Poland	65.48	68.26	x	68.26	q
9	A	Silja Kosonen	Finland	66.62	63.86	68.25	68.25	q
10	A	Iryna Klymets	Ukraine	x	67.87	x	67.87	q
11	B	Krista Tervo	Finland	65.76	67.80	x	67.80	q
12	B	Kıvılcım Kaya	Turkey	66.24	66.87	67.68	67.68	q
13	B	Laura Redondo	Spain	64.07	67.55	67.62	67.62	
14	A	Katarzyna Furmanek	Poland	64.85	67.62	x	67.62	
15	A	Samantha Borutta	Germany	65.51	67.40	66.47	67.40	
16	B	Zalina Marghieva	Moldova	67.15	65.31	x	67.15	
17	B	Stamatia Scarvelis	Greece	67.13	x	65.42	67.13	
18	A	Vanessa Sterckendries	Belgium	56.56	x	66.95	66.95	
19	B	Beatrice Nedberge Llano	Norway	x	66.32	x	66.32	
20	B	Rose Loga	France	66.27	x	x	66.27	
21	B	Veronika Kaňuchová	Slovakia	65.33	61.96	x	65.33	
22	B	Jessica Mayho	Great Britain	x	63.90	62.25	63.90	
	A	Sara Killinen	Finland	x	x	x	NM	
	B	Malwina Kopron	Poland	x	x	x	NM	
	A	Charlotte Payne	Great Britain	x	x	x	NM	
	B	Anna Purchase	Great Britain	x	x	x	NM	

=== Final ===
Rank	Name	Nationality	#1	#2	#3	#4	#5	#6	Result	Note
1st place, gold medalist(s)	Bianca Ghelber	Romania	72.22	72.06	71.22	71.36	71.75	72.72	72.72	
2nd place, silver medalist(s)	Ewa Różańska	Poland	71.63	70.92	71.03	x	x	72.12	72.12	PB
3rd place, bronze medalist(s)	Sara Fantini	Italy	71.51	x	69.84	x	x	71.58	71.58	
4	Hanna Skydan	Azerbaijan	64.08	68.79	70.88	x	x	69.04	70.88	
5	Silja Kosonen	Finland	68.81	x	69.27	68.55	x	69.45	69.45	
6	Iryna Klymets	Ukraine	68.72	x	68.57	x	69.18	67.92	69.18	
7	Réka Gyurátz	Hungary	68.16	66.97	69.02	68.62	69.01	x	69.02	
8	Krista Tervo	Finland	x	67.85	67.46	67.25	x	x	67.85	
9	Grete Ahlberg	Sweden	66.74	67.29	x				67.29	
10	Katrine Koch Jacobsen	Denmark	65.25	x	67.06				67.06	
11	Kıvılcım Kaya	Turkey	67.04	66.83	64.41				67.04	
12	Alexandra Tavernier	France	66.60	x	65.19				66.60	
