= Athletics at the 2019 Summer Universiade – Women's hammer throw =

The women's hammer throw event at the 2019 Summer Universiade was held on 10 and 12 July at the Stadio San Paolo in Naples.

== Medalists ==
Gold	Silver	Bronze
Iryna Klymets; Ukraine	Malwina Kopron; Poland	Katarzyna Furmanek; Poland

== Results ==
=== Qualification ===
Qualification: 68.00 m (Q) or at least 12 best (q) qualified for the final.

Rank	Name	Nationality	#1	#2	#3	Result	Notes
1	Réka Gyurátz	Hungary	68.05			68.05	Q
2	Iryna Klymets	Ukraine	x	62.42	68.01	68.01	Q
3	Malwina Kopron	Poland	67.98	x	–	67.98	q
4	Inga Linna	Finland	63.36	67.23	–	67.23	q, SB
5	Anamari Kožul	Croatia	x	66.62	62.61	66.62	q
6	Katarzyna Furmanek	Poland	64.49	61.62	62.55	64.49	q
7	Pavla Kuklová	Czech Republic	62.15	60.85	62.92	62.92	q
8	Mariana García	Chile	62.17	x	x	62.17	q
9	Lauren Bruce	New Zealand	61.47	x	x	61.47	q
10	Margaretha Cumming	South Africa	56.95	58.54	61.39	61.39	q, PB
11	Sina Holthuijsen	Netherlands	61.18	61.33	61.14	61.33	q, PB
12	Chanell Botsis	Canada	60.65	57.31	x	60.65	q
13	Jillian Shippee	United States	x	58.59	59.42	59.42	
14	Nadia Maffo	Italy	58.35	56.11	x	58.35	
15	Jordan McClendon	United States	55.54	x	x	55.54	
16	Lee Yu-ra	South Korea	50.84	52.22	51.23	52.22	
	Kaila Butler	Canada	x	x	x	NM	

=== Final ===
Official Video

Rank	Name	Nationality	#1	#2	#3	#4	#5	#6	Result	Notes
1st place, gold medalist(s)	Iryna Klymets	Ukraine	70.01	x	70.89	68.01	71.25	69.36	71.25	
2nd place, silver medalist(s)	Malwina Kopron	Poland	70.89	x	x	x	68.90	x	70.89	
3rd place, bronze medalist(s)	Katarzyna Furmanek	Poland	68.80	65.80	x	69.68	67.71	x	69.68	PB
4	Réka Gyurátz	Hungary	67.37	69.51	68.41	x	69.25	66.71	69.51	
5	Anamari Kožul	Croatia	68.28	x	66.89	x	x	63.20	68.28	
6	Inga Linna	Finland	55.01	63.80	55.30	x	61.23	59.84	63.80	
7	Lauren Bruce	New Zealand	61.64	61.90	x	x	62.50	61.97	62.50	
8	Pavla Kuklová	Czech Republic	61.34	x	60.21	x	x	x	61.34	
9	Chanell Botsis	Canada	60.16	60.14	60.16				60.16	
10	Sina Holthuijsen	Netherlands	x	57.24	59.20				59.20	
11	Margaretha Cumming	South Africa	x	x	58.80				58.80	
12	Mariana García	Chile	57.39	x	58.46				58.46	
