= Athletics at the 2015 Summer Universiade – Women's hammer throw =

The women's hammer throw event at the 2015 Summer Universiade was held on 9 July at the Gwangju Universiade Main Stadium.

== Results ==
Rank	Athlete	Nationality	#1	#2	#3	#4	#5	#6	Result	Notes
1st place, gold medalist(s)	Hanna Skydan	Azerbaijan	67.84	66.14	x	70.02	70.67	69.56	70.67	
2nd place, silver medalist(s)	Joanna Fiodorow	Poland	69.69	68.78	x	65.65	69.69	x	69.69	
3rd place, bronze medalist(s)	Julia Ratcliffe	New Zealand	64.80	62.72	67.54	62.43	x	66.61	67.54	
4	Luo Na	China	64.44	65.55	66.65	64.72	x	67.11	67.11	SB
5	Tereza Králová	Czech Republic	60.70	x	62.82	x	64.20	66.64	66.64	
6	Kati Ojaloo	Estonia	63.62	64.93	x	x	63.86	x	64.93	
7	Lara Nielsen	Australia	62.53	x	x	60.03	63.34	x	63.34	
8	Johanna Salmela	Finland	56.38	60.29	x	x	x	62.78	62.78	
9	Katja Vangsnes	Norway	56.67	56.83	55.44				56.83	
10	Anastasiya Aslanidu	Uzbekistan	49.60	50.09	48.76				50.09	
11	María Alejandra Beltrán	Colombia	44.25	x	46.64				46.64	
	Eva Reinders	Netherlands	x	x	x				NM	
