= DeAnna Price =

American hammer thrower (born 1993)

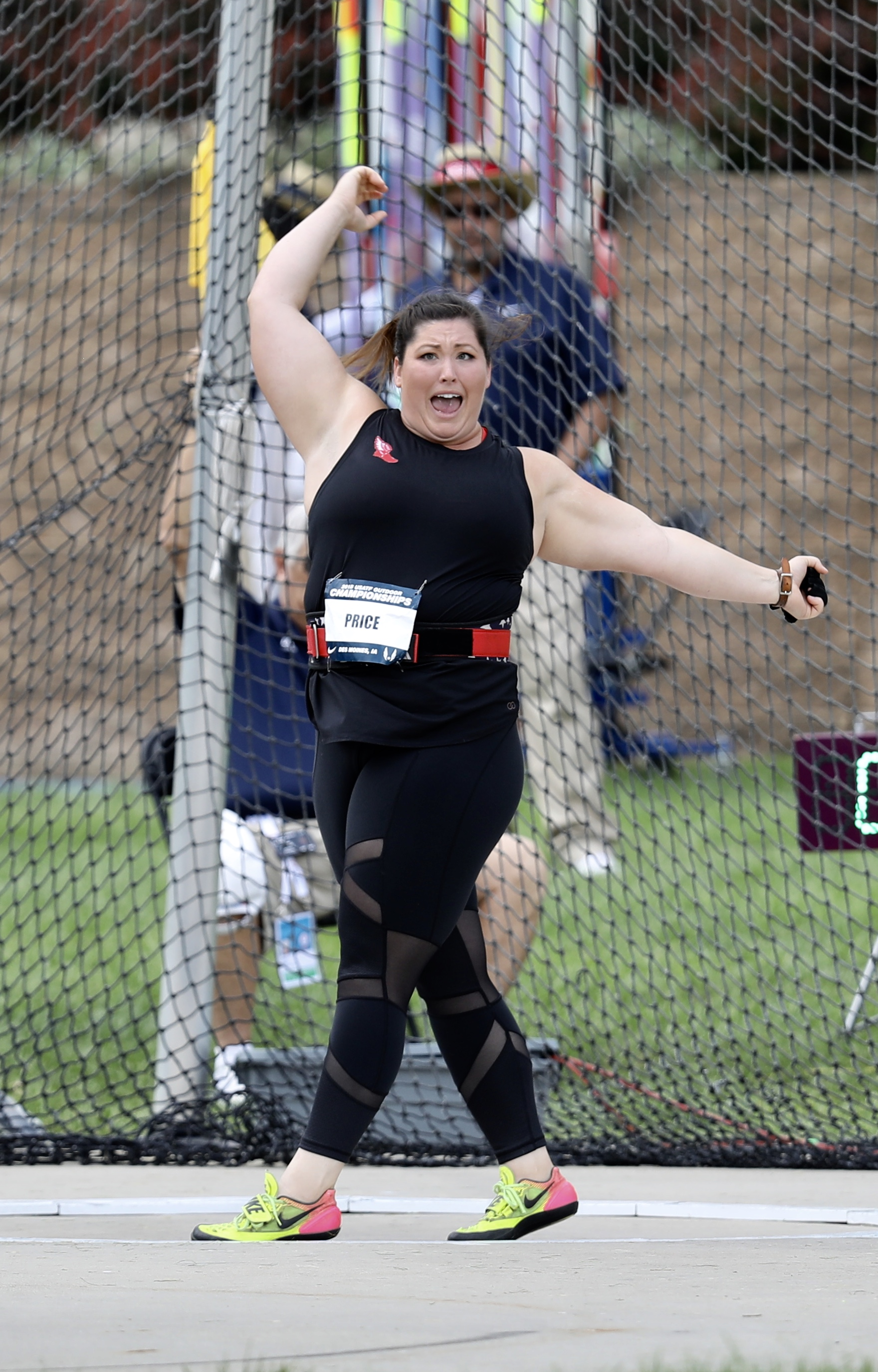
- Price at the 2018 USA Outdoor Track and Field Championships

Personal information
- Full name: DeAnna Marie Price
- Born: June 8, 1993 (age 33) St. Charles, Missouri, United States
- Height: 5 ft 8 in (1.72 m)
- Weight: 240 lb (109 kg)

Sport
- Country: United States
- Sport: Track and field
- Event: Hammer throw
- College team: Southern Illinois University

Achievements and titles
- Personal bests: 80.31 m (263 ft 5 3/4 in) NR, Eugene, 2021
Medal record
Women's athletics
Representing the United States
World Championships
Gold medal – first place	2019 Doha	Hammer throw
Bronze medal – third place	2023 Budapest	Hammer throw
Pan American Games
Gold medal – first place	2023 Santiago	Hammer throw
Representing Americas
Continental Cup
Gold medal – first place	2018 Ostrava	Hammer throw
- Updated on 28 September 2019

DeAnna Marie Price (born June 8, 1993) is an American track and field athlete competing primarily in the hammer throw. Price's personal best in the hammer is 80.31 m (263 ft 5 in), the American record, set at the 2020 US Olympic trials. The throw ranked her as the #3 women's thrower in history.

In February 2021, Price broke the women's world record in the indoor hammer-style 25-pound weight throw. Price, the former Southern Illinois University athlete, threw the weight 85-4¼, breaking the previous record of 83-11½ set by Gwen Berry in 2017.

== Career ==
Price attended Troy Buchanan High School in Troy, Missouri. There she was an All-State softball player and finished second in the discus and fifth in the shot put at the state track meet. Price had college scholarship offers in both softball and track and field.

While throwing for Southern Illinois University-Carbondale, she won back to back NCAA titles in the hammer throw. Price has endured a series of injuries and only has one kidney.

Price represented the USA at the 2015 World Championships in Beijing without qualifying for the final. A month before the World Championships, Price had finished fourth at the 2015 Pan American Games. Then, two weeks later, Price picked up her first international medal by taking a silver behind Amber Campbell at the 2015 NACAC Championships.

Price placed third in hammer behind Team USA teammates Amber Campbell and Gwen Berry at the 2016 United States Olympic Trials Price represented the United States at 2016 Summer Olympics, finishing eighth.

Price won the gold medal at the 2019 World Championships in Doha, becoming the first woman from the United States to medal in any women's throws event at a World Championships.

She was hired as an assistant coach for Illinois Fighting Illini in 2022.

Price competed in the women's hammer throw at the 2024 Summer Olympics. She threw 71 meters, placing 11th at the event.

== Competition record ==
Year	Competition	Venue	Position	Notes
Representing the United States
2012	World Junior Championships	Barcelona, Spain	18th (q)	57.82 m
2015	Pan American Games	Toronto, Canada	4th	68.84 m
2015	NACAC Championships	San José, Costa Rica	2nd	71.27 m
2015	World Championships	Beijing, China	18th (q)	68.69 m
2016	Olympic Games	Rio de Janeiro, Brazil	8th	70.95 m
2017	World Championships	London, United Kingdom	9th	70.04 m
2017	DécaNation	Angers, France	2nd	70.60 m
2018	NACAC Championships	Toronto, Canada	1st	74.60 m
2019	World Championships	Doha, Qatar	1st	77.54 m
2021	Olympic Games	Tokyo, Japan	8th	73.09 m
2023	World Championships	Budapest, Hungary	3rd	75.41 m
2023	Pan American Games	Santiago, Chile	1st	72.34 m
2024	Olympic Games	Paris, France	11th	71.00 m
2025	World Championships	Tokyo, Japan	5th	75.10 m

== Personal bests ==
Outdoor

- Shot put – 16.30 m (Mt. SAC Relays 2015)
- Hammer throw – 80.31 m (Olympic Trials, 2021)
- Discus – 53.46 m (MVC Outdoors 2015)

Indoor

- Shot put – 16.29 m (Carbondale 2014)
- Weight throw – 26.02 m (Albuquerque, 2023, World Record)
