= Zalina Marghieva =

Moldovan hammer thrower (born 1988)

Personal information
- Full name: Zalina Soslanovna Marghieva
- Born: 5 February 1988 (age 38) Vladikavkaz, Russian SFSR, Soviet Union
- Height: 1.70 m (5 ft 7 in)
- Weight: 80 kg (176 lb)

Sport
- Country: Moldova
- Sport: Athletics
- Event: Hammer throw
Medal record
Universiade
Gold medal – first place	2011 Shenzhen	Hammer throw
Bronze medal – third place	2013 Kazan	Hammer throw
European Athletics U23 Championships
Gold medal – first place	2009 Kaunas	Hammer throw
European Cup Winter Throwing
Gold medal – first place	2012 Split	Hammer throws
Gold medal – first place	2013 Split	Hammer throws
- Updated on 15 August 2016

Zalina Marghieva (Russian: Залина Сослановна Маргиева; born 5 February 1988) is a female hammer thrower who competes for Moldova. Born in Russia, she is the sister of Marina Marghieva and Serghei Marghiev, and is coached by her father Soslan.

As a junior, she finished fifth at the 2005 World Youth Championships, fourth at the 2006 World Junior Championships and fifth at the 2007 European Junior Championships. She then competed at the 2008 Olympic Games without reaching the final. At the 2009 European U23 Championships she won the gold medal.

She threw a personal best of 71.56 metres in January 2009 in Chişinău to break the national record. She improved this further at the 2011 national winter throws meeting in Chişinău, winning the event with a mark of 72.74 m.

== Doping ==
Similarly to her sister, Marina, she served a two-year ban from athletics after testing positive for prohibited substances dehydrochloromethyltestosterone and stanozolol back in 2009. She resumed competition when her ineligibility ended on 23 July 2015.

== Achievements ==
Year	Competition	Venue	Position	Notes
Representing Moldova
2006	World Junior Championships	Beijing, China	4th	63.24 m
2008	Olympic Games	Beijing, China	37th (q)	64.20 m
2009	Universiade	Belgrade, Serbia	8th	67.05 m
2009	European U23 Championships	Kaunas, Lithuania	1st	67.67 m
2009	World Championships	Berlin, Germany	26th (q)	66.70 m
2010	European Championships	Barcelona, Spain	5th	70.83 m
2011	Universiade	Shenzhen, China	1st	72.93 m
2011	World Championships	Daegu, South Korea	8th	70.27 m
2013	Universiade	Kazan, Russia	3rd	71.10 m
2015	World Championships	Beijing, China	8th	72.38 m
2016	European Championships	Amsterdam, Netherlands	5th	71.73 m
2016	Olympic Games	Rio de Janeiro, Brazil	5th	73.50 m
2017	World Championships	London, United Kingdom	19th (q)	67.05 m
2017	DécaNation	Angers, France	3rd	69.68 m
2018	European Championships	Berlin, Germany	6th	71.80 m
2019	World Championships	Doha, Qatar	4th	74.33 m
2021	Olympic Games	Tokyo, Japan	17th (q)	69.29 m
2022	Championships of the Small States of Europe	Marsa, Malta	1st	66.06 m
2022	World Championships	Eugene, United States	17th (q)	69.73 m
2022	European Championships	Munich, Germany	16th (q)	67.15 m
2024	Olympic Games	Paris, France	22nd (q)	67.84 m
