= Ariannis Vichy =

Cuban hammer thrower

Personal information
- Full name: Ariannis Vichy Saladre
- Born: 18 May 1989 (age 37) Santiago de Cuba, Cuba

Sport
- Country: Cuba
- Sport: Athletics
- Updated on 28 January 2015

Ariannis Vichy Saladre (born 18 May 1989) is a Cuban hammer thrower. She competed in the hammer throw event at the 2012 Summer Olympics.

== Personal bests ==
- Hammer throw: 71.50 m – Havana, Cuba, 29 June 2012

== Competition record ==
Year	Competition	Venue	Position	Notes
Representing Cuba
2007	Pan American Junior Championships	São Paulo, Brazil	2nd	59.46 m
2008	World Junior Championships	Bydgoszcz, Poland	5th	58.78 m
2009	ALBA Games	Havana, Cuba	4th	66.09 m
2009	Central American and Caribbean Championships	Havana, Cuba	5th	63.72 m
2011	ALBA Games	Barquisimeto, Venezuela	2nd	62.08 m
2012	Olympic Games	London, United Kingdom	25th (q)	67.48 m
2014	Pan American Sports Festival	Mexico City, Mexico	4th	68.74m A
2015	Pan American Games	Toronto, Canada	6th	65.60 m
2015	NACAC Championships	San José, Costa Rica	5th	66.60 m
