= 2008 World Junior Championships in Athletics – Women's hammer throw =

The women's hammer throw event at the 2008 World Junior Championships in Athletics was held in Bydgoszcz, Poland, at Zawisza Stadium on 8 and 9 July.

== Medalists ==
Gold	Bianca Perie; Romania
Silver	Kateřina Šafránková; Czech Republic
Bronze	Jenny Ozorai; Hungary

== Results ==
=== Final ===
9 July

Rank	Name	Nationality	Attempts						Result	Notes
Rank	Name	Nationality	1	2	3	4	5	6	Result	Notes
1st place, gold medalist(s)	Bianca Perie	Romania	64.66	67.95	63.53	65.51	x	66.65	67.95	
2nd place, silver medalist(s)	Kateřina Šafránková	Czech Republic	x	62.78	x	59.86	63.13	60.01	63.13	
3rd place, bronze medalist(s)	Jenny Ozorai	Hungary	x	58.82	54.07	59.54	60.80	x	60.80	
4	Barbara Špiler	Slovenia	51.03	55.70	58.03	60.18	x	59.77	60.18	
5	Arianni Vichy	Cuba	58.78	x	57.17	x	57.34	54.87	58.78	
6	Gabi Wolfarth	Germany	54.11	58.69	53.02	55.90	x	57.74	58.69	
7	Sophie Hitchon	United Kingdom	56.01	58.45	56.88	x	56.42	x	58.45	
8	Alina Kastrova	Belarus	58.03	57.41	56.71	57.27	x	x	58.03	
9	Natallia Shayunova	Belarus	57.50	58.00	57.16				58.00	
10	Andriana Papadopoúlou-Fatala	Greece	57.98	57.37	56.25				57.98	
11	Carolin Paesler	Germany	x	52.88	57.29				57.29	
12	Tereza Králová	Czech Republic	55.90	53.42	x				55.90	

=== Qualifications ===
8 July

==== Group A ====
Rank	Name	Nationality	Attempts			Result	Notes
Rank	Name	Nationality	1	2	3	Result	Notes
1	Arianni Vichy	Cuba	59.70	62.23	-	62.23	Q
2	Sophie Hitchon	United Kingdom	59.57	59.07	55.24	59.57	q
3	Barbara Špiler	Slovenia	56.47	x	59.48	59.48	q
4	Andriana Papadopoúlou-Fatala	Greece	59.42	x	56.32	59.42	q
5	Carolin Paesler	Germany	57.44	x	58.46	58.46	q
6	Alina Kastrova	Belarus	x	58.32	x	58.32	q
7	Kateřina Šafránková	Czech Republic	58.07	x	57.57	58.07	q
8	Eszter Németh	Hungary	55.69	57.21	57.79	57.79	
9	Trude Raad	Norway	57.67	56.24	57.41	57.67	
10	Karina Frolova	Russia	53.49	53.91	56.80	56.80	
11	Dagmara Stala	Poland	51.16	53.58	54.45	54.45	
12	D'Ana McCarty	United States	51.47	53.97	51.98	53.97	
13	Tatiana Massamba	France	x	52.76	x	52.76	
14	Erica Ekholm	Finland	x	52.06	50.86	52.06	

==== Group B ====
Rank	Name	Nationality	Attempts			Result	Notes
Rank	Name	Nationality	1	2	3	Result	Notes
1	Bianca Perie	Romania	61.10	-	-	61.10	Q
2	Natallia Shayunova	Belarus	56.32	58.64	x	58.64	q
3	Gabi Wolfarth	Germany	55.19	58.50	57.03	58.50	q
4	Jenny Ozorai	Hungary	x	57.95	53.10	57.95	q
5	Tereza Králová	Czech Republic	54.96	x	57.82	57.82	q
6	Jessika Guehaseim	France	56.07	57.53	x	57.53	
7	Jonna Miettinen	Finland	54.23	53.22	54.68	54.68	
8	Joanna Fiodorow	Poland	48.52	54.36	x	54.36	
9	Pasa Sehic	Bosnia and Herzegovina	52.79	x	54.29	54.29	
10	Lee Jae-Young	South Korea	53.26	x	52.14	53.26	
11	Rana Taha	Egypt	51.26	53.02	52.59	53.02	
12	Galina Mityaeva	Tajikistan	x	49.47	52.57	52.57	
13	Halyna Kaplun	Ukraine	x	52.22	x	52.22	
	Lauren Chambers	United States	x	x	x	NM	

== Participation ==
According to an unofficial count, 28 athletes from 20 countries participated in the event.

- Belarus (2)
- Bosnia and Herzegovina (1)
- Cuba (1)
- Czech Republic (2)
- Egypt (1)
- Finland (2)
- France (2)
- Germany (2)
- Greece (1)
- Hungary (2)
- Norway (1)
- Poland (2)
- Romania (1)
- Russia (1)
- Slovenia (1)
- South Korea (1)
- Tajikistan (1)
- Ukraine (1)
- United Kingdom (1)
- United States (2)
