= Athletics at the 2017 Summer Universiade – Women's hammer throw =

The women's hammer throw event at the 2017 Summer Universiade was held on 24 and 26 August 2017 at the Taipei Municipal Stadium.

== Medalists ==
| Gold | Silver | Bronze |
|---|---|---|
| Malwina Kopron; Poland | Hanna Malyshchyk; Belarus | Joanna Fiodorow; Poland |

== Results ==
=== Qualification ===
Qualification: 59.00 m (Q) or at least 12 best (q) qualified for the final.

| Rank | Group | Athlete | Nationality | #1 | #2 | #3 | Result | Notes |
|---|---|---|---|---|---|---|---|---|
| 1 | B | Malwina Kopron | Poland | 73.01 | | | 73.01 | Q |
| 2 | B | Hanna Malyshchyk | Belarus | 68.07 | | | 68.07 | Q |
| 3 | A | Joanna Fiodorow | Poland | 67.23 | | | 67.23 | Q |
| 4 | B | Tereza Králová | Czech Republic | x | 65.25 | | 65.25 | Q |
| 5 | B | Kıvılcım Kaya Salman | Turkey | x | 65.11 | | 65.11 | Q |
| 6 | B | Alexandra Tavernier | France | 64.20 | | | 64.20 | Q |
| 7 | A | Réka Gyurátz | Hungary | 63.38 | | | 63.38 | Q |
| 8 | A | Sara Fantini | Italy | 55.78 | 62.92 | | 62.92 | Q |
| 9 | B | Mariana Marcelino | Brazil | 62.07 | | | 62.07 | Q |
| 10 | A | Julia Ratcliffe | New Zealand | 58.57 | 60.66 | | 60.66 | Q |
| 11 | A | Veronika Kaňuchová | Slovakia | 60.45 | | | 60.45 | Q |
| 12 | B | Lara Nielsen | Australia | x | 58.15 | 60.42 | 60.42 | Q |
| 13 | B | Sophie Gimmler | Germany | 59.99 | | | 59.99 | Q |
| 14 | B | Letitia Janse van Vuuren | South Africa | 58.02 | 58.53 | 59.85 | 59.85 | Q |
| 15 | B | Agnes Esser | Canada | 57.42 | 57.26 | 57.61 | 57.61 | |
| 16 | A | Sina Holthuijsen | Netherlands | 55.30 | 53.72 | 54.98 | 55.30 | |
| 17 | A | Diana Nussupbekova | Kazakhstan | 54.46 | x | 53.18 | 54.46 | |
| 18 | A | Mikaila Martin | United States | 52.71 | x | x | 52.71 | |
| 19 | B | Taylor Scaife | United States | x | 51.34 | x | 51.34 | |
| 20 | A | Daniela Gómez | Argentina | 50.54 | x | 49.32 | 50.54 | |
| | A | María Beltrán | Colombia | x | x | x | NM | |
| | A | Hanna Skydan | Azerbaijan | x | x | x | NM | |
| | B | Mayra Gaviria | Colombia | x | x | x | NM | |

=== Final ===
| Rank | Name | Nationality | #1 | #2 | #3 | #4 | #5 | #6 | Result | Notes |
|---|---|---|---|---|---|---|---|---|---|---|
| 1st place, gold medalist(s) | Malwina Kopron | Poland | 76.85 | x | 74.78 | x | x | 73.78 | 76.85 | UR, PB |
| 2nd place, silver medalist(s) | Hanna Malyshchyk | Belarus | 72.13 | x | x | x | 73.49 | 74.93 | 74.93 | |
| 3rd place, bronze medalist(s) | Joanna Fiodorow | Poland | x | 70.34 | x | 71.33 | 70.45 | x | 71.33 | |
| 4 | Kıvılcım Kaya Salman | Turkey | 67.08 | 67.51 | 67.96 | 66.16 | 68.88 | 70.41 | 70.41 | |
| 5 | Alexandra Tavernier | France | 67.88 | 65.31 | 68.79 | 68.32 | 67.56 | 70.20 | 70.20 | |
| 6 | Lara Nielsen | Australia | 65.47 | x | 60.52 | x | x | 63.40 | 65.47 | |
| 7 | Mariana Marcelino | Brazil | x | 64.62 | 65.39 | x | x | 63.71 | 65.39 | |
| 8 | Tereza Králová | Czech Republic | 65.06 | x | x | x | x | 61.13 | 65.06 | |
| 9 | Réka Gyurátz | Hungary | x | x | 64.14 | | | | 64.14 | |
| 10 | Veronika Kaňuchová | Slovakia | 63.14 | 62.80 | 63.06 | | | | 63.14 | |
| 11 | Julia Ratcliffe | New Zealand | x | x | 61.39 | | | | 61.39 | |
| 12 | Sara Fantini | Italy | x | x | 60.82 | | | | 60.82 | |
| 13 | Sophie Gimmler | Germany | 54.30 | 54.39 | 60.71 | | | | 60.71 | |
| 14 | Letitia Janse van Vuuren | South Africa | 51.55 | 56.24 | 56.81 | | | | 56.81 | |
