= Malwina Kopron =

Polish hammer thrower (born 1994)

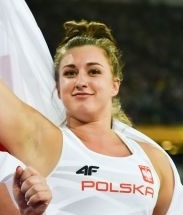
- Kopron at the 2017 World Championships

Personal information
- Born: 16 November 1994 (age 31) Puławy, Poland
- Education: Maria Curie-Skłodowska University
- Height: 167 cm (5 ft 6 in)
- Weight: 73 kg (161 lb)

Sport
- Country: Poland
- Sport: Track and field
- Event: Hammer throw
- Club: OŚ AZS Poznań
- Coached by: Witold Kopron
Medal record
Women's athletics
Representing Poland
Olympic Games
Bronze medal – third place	2020 Tokyo	Hammer throw
World Championships
Bronze medal – third place	2017 London	Hammer throw
European Team Championships
Silver medal – second place	2021 Chorzów	Hammer throw
European U23 Championships
Bronze medal – third place	2015 Tallinn	Hammer throw
Summer Universiade
Gold medal – first place	2017 Taipei	Hammer throw
Silver medal – second place	2019 Naples	Hammer throw
Military World Games
Bronze medal – third place	2019 Wuhan	Hammer throw

Malwina Kopron (born 16 November 1994) is a Polish athlete specialising in the hammer throw. She won the bronze medal at the 2017 World Championships in London and at the 2020 Summer Olympics in Tokyo. In addition, she also won the bronze at the 2015 European U23 Championships.

Her personal best in the event is 76.85 metres set in Taipei (during the Universiade) in 2017.

== Competition record ==
Year	Competition	Venue	Position	Event	Notes
Representing Poland
2011	World Youth Championships	Lille, France	2nd	Hammer throw	57.03 m
2012	World Junior Championships	Barcelona, Spain	–	Hammer throw	NM
2013	European Junior Championships	Rieti, Italy	4th	Hammer throw	63.13 m
2015	European U23 Championships	Tallinn, Estonia	3rd	Hammer throw	68.57 m
2015	World Championships	Beijing, China	14th (q)	Hammer throw	69.53 m
2016	European Championships	Amsterdam, Netherlands	6th	Hammer throw	70.91 m
2016	Olympic Games	Rio de Janeiro, Brazil	15th (q)	Hammer throw	69.69 m
2017	World Championships	London, United Kingdom	3rd	Hammer throw	74.76 m
2017	Universiade	Taipei, Taiwan	1st	Hammer throw	76.85 m
2017	DécaNation	Angers, France	1st	Hammer throw	72.03 m
2018	European Championships	Berlin, Germany	4th	Hammer throw	72.20 m
2019	Universiade	Naples, Italy	2nd	Hammer throw	70.89 m
2019	World Championships	Doha, Qatar	13th (q)	Hammer throw	70.46 m
2019	Military World Games	Wuhan, China	3rd	Hammer throw	67.12 m
2021	Olympic Games	Tokyo, Japan	3rd	Hammer throw	75.49 m
2022	World Championships	Eugene, United States	15th (q)	Hammer throw	70.50 m
2022	European Championships	Munich, Germany	–	Hammer throw	NM
2023	World Championships	Budapest, Hungary	9th (q)	Hammer throw	72.35 m^{1}
2024	European Championships	Rome, Italy	7th	Hammer throw	69.72 m
2024	Olympic Games	Paris, France	23rd (q)	Hammer throw	67.68 m

^{1}No mark in the final
