= Alexandra Tavernier =

French hammer thrower (born 1993)

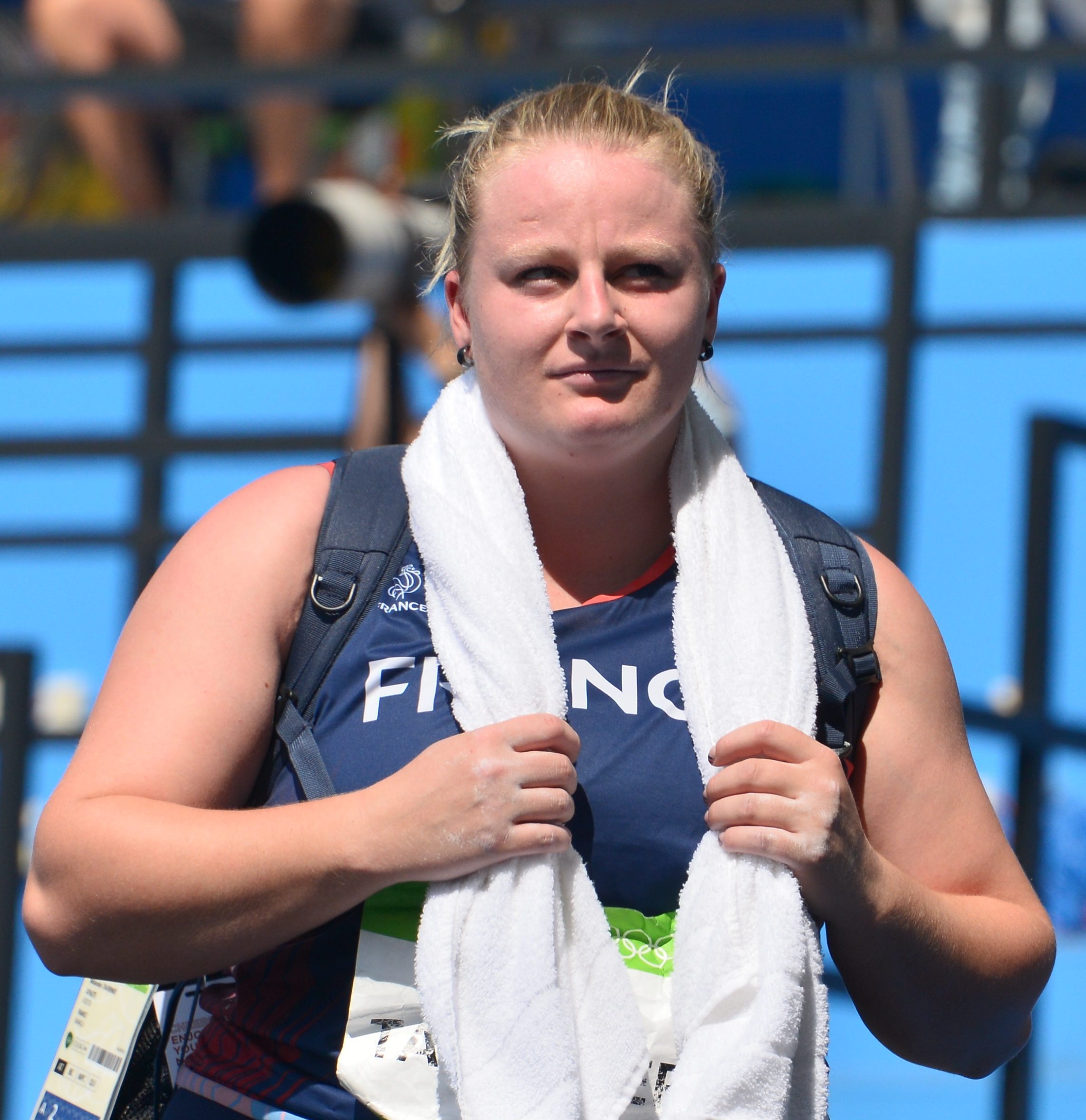
- Tavernier at the 2016 Olympics

Personal information
- Born: 13 December 1993 (age 32) Annecy, France
- Education: Ecole Catholique de Bretagne
- Height: 1.70 m (5 ft 7 in)
- Weight: 82 kg (181 lb)

Sport
- Country: France
- Sport: Track and field
- Event: Hammer throw
- Club: Annecy Haute-Savoie Athlétisme
- Coached by: Christophe Tavernier (−2014); Walter Ciofani (−2016); Guy Guerin (2016–)

Achievements and titles
- Personal best: 75.23 m (2020)
Medal record
Women's athletics
Representing France
World Championships
| Bronze medal – third place | 2015 Beijing | Hammer throw |
European Championships
| Silver medal – second place | 2018 Berlin | Hammer throw |

Alexandra Tavernier (born 13 December 1993) is a French hammer thrower. She finished sixth at the 2014 European Championships. She won gold medals at the 2015 European U23 Championships and 2012 World Junior Championships.

== Career ==
On 26 August 2015, when she participated in her first world championships, she improved her personal best by 34 cm in qualifying, bringing her personal best to 74.39 m; thus, she qualified for her first world championship final when she was only 21 years old. She was second in the qualifying round. The next day, she won the bronze medal, her first international medal in the senior ranks with a throw at 74.02 meters.

Tavernier took up athletics in 2004 and until 2014 was coached by her father Christophe. Her father and mother are retired hammer throwers, while her younger brother competes at a junior level.

== Competition record ==
| Year | Competition | Venue | Position | Event | Notes |
Representing France
| 2011 | European Junior Championships | Tallinn, Estonia | 6th | Hammer throw | 60.66 m |
| 2012 | World Junior Championships | Barcelona, Spain | 1st | Hammer throw | 70.62 m |
| 2013 | European U23 Championships | Tampere, Finland | – | Hammer throw | NM |
| 2013 | Jeux de la Francophonie | Nice, France | 3rd | Hammer throw | 69.95 m |
| 2014 | European Championships | Zürich, Switzerland | 6th | Hammer throw | 70.32 m |
| 2015 | European U23 Championships | Tallinn, Estonia | 1st | Hammer throw | 72.50 m |
| 2015 | World Championships | Beijing, China | 3rd | Hammer throw | 74.02 m |
| 2016 | European Championships | Amsterdam, Netherlands | – | Hammer throw | NM |
| 2016 | Olympic Games | Rio de Janeiro, Brazil | 11th (q) | Hammer throw | 65.18 m |
| 2017 | World Championships | London, United Kingdom | 12th | Hammer throw | 66.31 m |
| 2017 | Universiade | Taipei, Taiwan | 5th | Hammer throw | 70.20 m |
| 2018 | Mediterranean Games | Tarragona, Spain | 1st | Hammer throw | 73.67 m (GR) |
| 2018 | European Championships | Berlin, Germany | 2nd | Hammer throw | 74.78 m, NR |
| 2019 | World Championships | Doha, Qatar | 6th | Hammer throw | 73.33 m |
| 2021 | Olympic Games | Tokyo, Japan | 4th | Hammer throw | 74.41 m |
| 2022 | European Championships | Munich, Germany | 12th | Hammer throw | 66.60 m |
| 2023 | World Championships | Budapest, Hungary | 17th (q) | Hammer throw | 70.19 m |
| 2024 | European Championships | Rome, Italy | 18th (q) | Hammer throw | 67.11 m |
| 2024 | Olympic Games | Paris, France | – | Hammer throw | NM |
