= Susen Küster =

German hammer thrower

Personal information
- Nationality: German
- Born: 27 July 1994 (age 31)

Sport
- Sport: Athletics
- Event: Hammer throw

Susen Küster (born 27 July 1994) is a German hammer thrower. She competed in the women's hammer throw at the 2017 World Championships in Athletics.
