= Tereza Králová =

Czech hammer thrower (born 1989)

Personal information
- Born: 22 October 1989 (age 36) Brno, Czechoslovakia
- Education: Masaryk University
- Height: 1.75 m (5 ft 9 in)
- Weight: 85 kg (187 lb)

Sport
- Country: Czech Republic
- Sport: Track and field
- Event: Hammer throw
- Club: USK Praha
- Coached by: Lucie Plášilová
- Updated on 1 September 2015

Tereza Králová (born 22 October 1989) is a Czech athlete specialising in the hammer throw. She represented her country at two World Championships, in 2013 and 2015 without qualifying for the final.

Her personal best in the event is 70.21 metres in Kladno in 2013.

== Competition record ==
Year	Competition	Venue	Position	Event	Notes
Representing the Czech Republic
2008	World Junior Championships	Bydgoszcz, Poland	12th	Hammer throw	55.90 m
2011	European U23 Championships	Ostrava, Czech Republic	7th	Hammer throw	65.05 m
2012	European Championships	Helsinki, Finland	12th	Hammer throw	65.87 m
2013	Universiade	Kazan, Russia	6th	Hammer throw	66.70 m
2013	World Championships	Moscow, Russia	24th (q)	Hammer throw	64.74 m
2014	European Championships	Zürich, Switzerland	–	Hammer throw	NM
2015	Universiade	Gwangju, South Korea	5th	Hammer throw	66.64 m
2015	World Championships	Beijing, China	30th (q)	Hammer throw	61.39 m
2017	Universiade	Taipei, Taiwan	8th	Hammer throw	65.06 m
