= Iryna Novozhylova =

Ukrainian hammer thrower

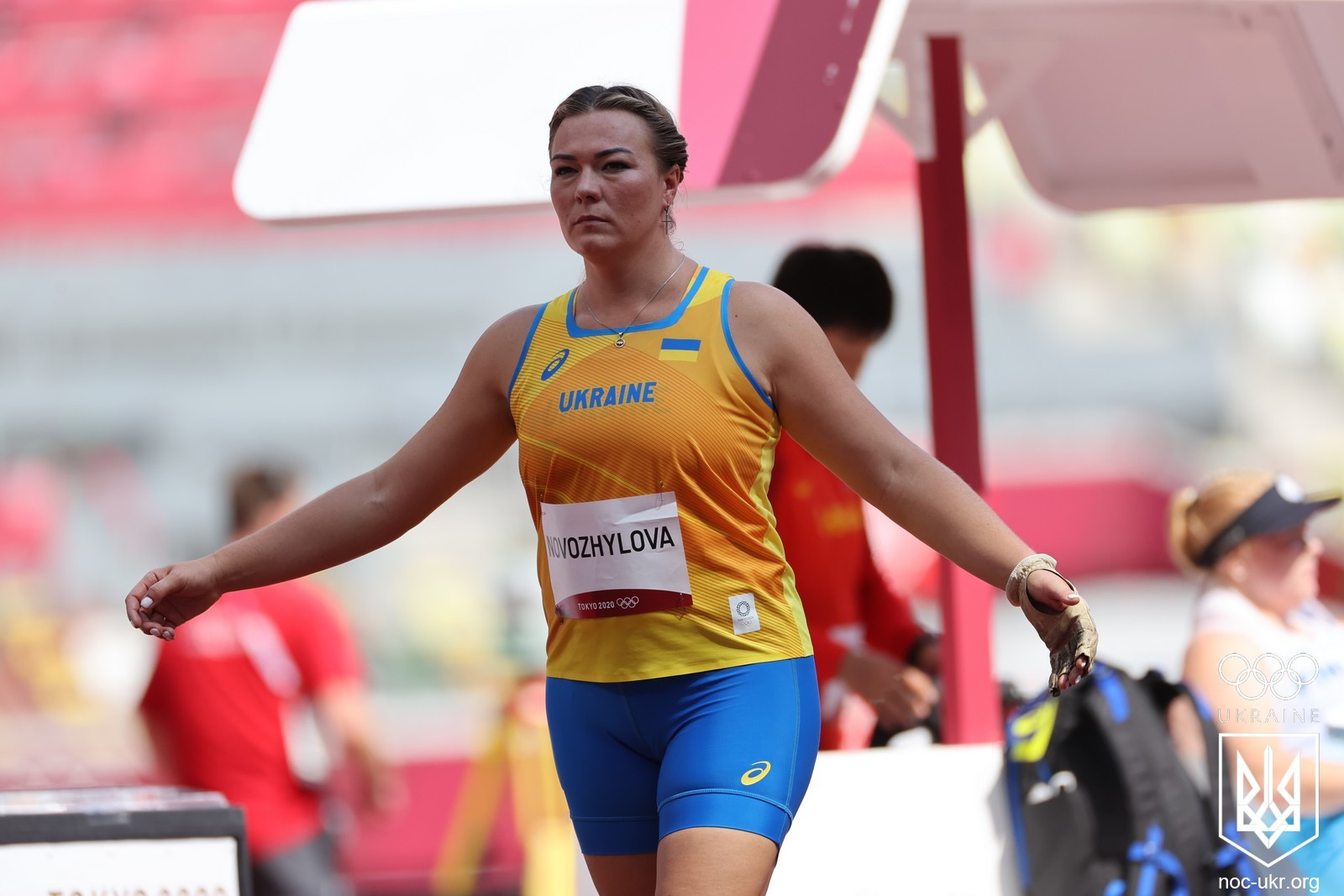
- Novozhylova at the 2020 Summer Olympics

Personal information
- Born: January 7, 1986 (age 40)
- Height: 1.75 m (5 ft 9 in)
- Weight: 85 kg (187 lb)

Sport
- Country: Ukraine
- Sport: Athletics
- Event: Hammer throw
- Updated on 14 August 2012

Iryna Oleksandrivna Novozhylova (Ukrainian: Ірина Олександрівна Новожилова; born 7 January 1986 in Shostka, Sumy) is a Ukrainian hammer thrower.

== Career ==
She competed at the 2008 Olympic Games and 2012 Olympic Games without reaching the final. Her personal best throw is 74.10 metres, achieved in May 2012 in Kyiv.

== Competition record ==
Year	Competition	Venue	Position	Notes
Representing Ukraine
2005	European Junior Championships	Kaunas, Lithuania	6th	58.40 m
2007	European U23 Championships	Debrecen, Hungary	7th	64.08 m
2008	Olympic Games	Beijing, China	19th (q)	68.11 m
2009	World Championships	Berlin, Germany	32nd (q)	64.90 m
2012	Olympic Games	London, United Kingdom	33rd (q)	65.35 m
2013	Universiade	Kazan, Russia	10th	62.04 m
2014	European Championships	Zürich, Switzerland	17th (q)	63.78 m
2015	World Championships	Beijing, China	27th (q)	65.65 m
2016	European Championships	Amsterdam, Netherlands	8th	70.18 m
2016	Olympic Games	Rio de Janeiro, Brazil	22nd (q)	66.70 m
2017	World Championships	London, United Kingdom	23rd (q)	66.02 m
2018	European Championships	Berlin, Germany	23rd (q)	64.70 m
2019	World Championships	Doha, Qatar	30th (q)	65.31 m
2021	Olympic Games	Tokyo, Japan	30th (q)	59.85 m
