= Hanna Skydan =

Ukrainian-Azerbaijani hammer thrower (born 1992)

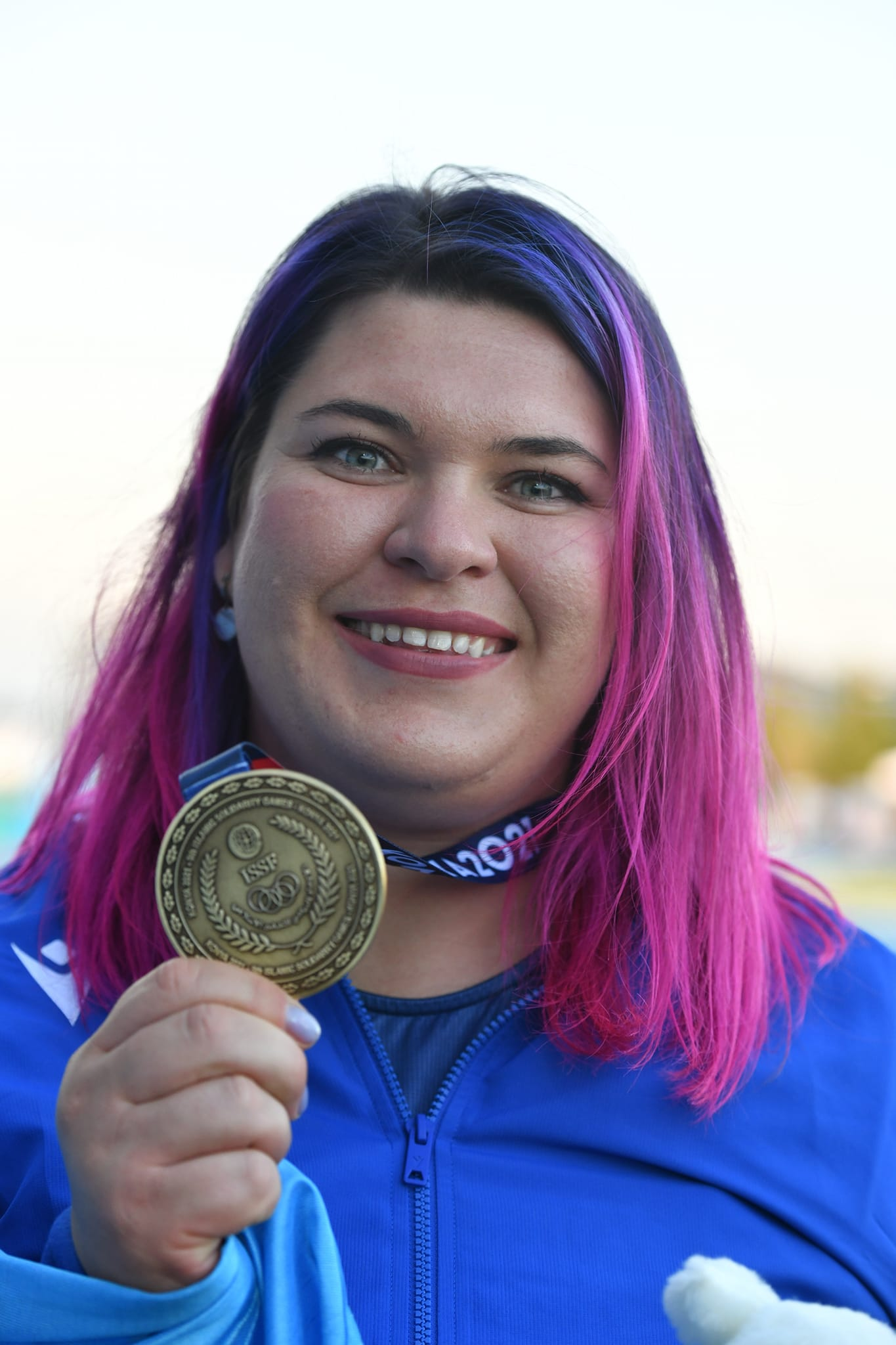
- Skydan in 2022.

Personal information
- Nationality: Ukraine (until 2014); Azerbaijan (since January 2015)
- Born: 14 May 1992 (age 34) Krasnyi Luch, Ukraine
- Education: Azerbaijan State Academy of Physical Culture and Sport
- Height: 1.78 m (5 ft 10 in)
- Weight: 105 kg (231 lb)

Sport
- Sport: Track and field
- Event: Hammer throw
Medal record
Women's athletics
Representing Azerbaijan
Islamic Solidarity Games
Gold medal – first place	2017 Baku	Hammer throw
European Championships
Bronze medal – third place	2016 Amsterdam	Hammer throw
Universiade
Gold medal – first place	2015 Gwangju	Hammer throw

Hanna Skydan (Ukrainian: Ганна Скидан, Azerbaijani: Anna Skidan; born 14 May 1992 in Krasnyi Luch, Ukraine) is a Ukrainian-born Azerbaijani hammer thrower. She competed for her country of birth at the 2012 Summer Olympics, and for Azerbaijan at the 2020 Summer Olympics, in Women's hammer throw.

== Career ==
For Azerbaijan she won the gold medals at the 2015 Summer Universiade and 2017 Islamic Solidarity Games.

Her personal best in the event is 75.29 metres set in Baku in 2017.

== Competition record ==
Year	Competition	Venue	Position	Event	Notes
Representing Ukraine
2009	European Youth Olympic Festival	Tampere, Finland	5th	Hammer throw	54.55 m
2009	World Youth Championships	Brixen, Italy	12th	Hammer throw	48.30 m
2010	World Junior Championships	Moncton, Canada	27th (q)	Hammer throw	48.78 m
2011	European Junior Championships	Tallinn, Estonia	–	Hammer throw	NM
2012	Olympic Games	London, United Kingdom	19th (q)	Hammer throw	68.50 m
Representing Azerbaijan
2015	Universiade	Gwangju, South Korea	1st	Hammer throw	70.67 m
2015	World Championships	Beijing, China	23rd (q)	Hammer throw	66.91 m
2016	Championships of the Small States of Europe	Marsa, Malta	1st	Hammer throw	71.41 m
2016	European Championships	Amsterdam, Netherlands	3rd	Hammer throw	73.83 m
2016	Olympic Games	Rio de Janeiro, Brazil	13th (q)	Hammer throw	70.09 m
2017	Islamic Solidarity Games	Baku, Azerbaijan	1st	Hammer throw	75.29 m
2017	World Championships	London, United Kingdom	5th	Hammer throw	73.38 m
2017	Universiade	Taipei, Taiwan	–	Hammer throw	NM
2018	European Championships	Berlin, Germany	5th	Hammer throw	72.10 m
2019	World Championships	Doha, Qatar	7th	Hammer throw	72.83 m
2021	Olympic Games	Tokyo, Japan	16th (q)	Hammer throw	69.57 m
2022	World Championships	Eugene, United States	11th	Hammer throw	69.01 m
2022	Islamic Solidarity Games	Konya, Turkey	1st	Hammer throw	70.23 m
2022	European Championships	Munich, Germany	4th	Hammer throw	70.88 m
2023	World Championships	Budapest, Hungary	4th	Hammer throw	74.18 m
2024	European Championships	Rome, Italy	10th	Hammer throw	68.10 m
2024	Olympic Games	Paris, France	7th	Hammer throw	73.66 m
