= Hanna Malyshchyk =

Belarusian hammer thrower

Hanna Malyshik
Personal information
- Nationality: Belarusian
- Born: February 4, 1994 (age 32) Drahichyn, Belarus
- Height: 1.75 m (5 ft 9 in)
- Weight: 90 kg (198 lb)

Sport
- Sport: Track and field
- Event: Hammer throw

Achievements and titles
- Personal best: Hammer throw: 74.94 m (2017)

Hanna Alyaksandrauna Malyshik (née Zinchuk; Belarusian: Ганна Аляксандраўна Малышчык (Зінчук); born 4 February 1994) is a Belarusian female track and field athlete who competes in the hammer throw. She represented her country at the 2016 Summer Olympics, placing seventh in the final. Her personal best is 72.31 m (237 ft 2 3/4 in), set in 2016.

At age category level, she won several medals, starting with a gold at the 2011 European Youth Olympic Festival. She progressed to junior gold at the 2013 European Athletics Junior Championships, then under-23 gold at the 2016 European Cup Winter Throwing. She represented Belarus at the 2016 European Athletics Championships.

Malyshchyk is currently serving a two-year suspension from competition for a doping violation due to expire in August 2025.

== International competitions ==
Year	Competition	Venue	Position	Event	Notes
2011	World Youth Championships	Lille, France	9th (q)	Hammer throw	52.73 m
2011	European Youth Olympic Festival	Trabzon, Turkey	1st	Hammer throw	59.48 m
2012	World Junior Championships	Barcelona, Spain	—	Hammer throw	NM
2013	European Throwing Cup (U23)	Castellón de la Plana, Spain	3rd	Hammer throw	63.78 m
2013	European Junior Championships	Rieti, Italy	1st	Hammer throw	65.44 m
2016	European Throwing Cup (U23)	Arad, Romania	1st	Hammer throw	68.76 m
2016	European Championships	Amsterdam, Netherlands	26th	Hammer throw	63.16 m
2016	Olympic Games	Rio de Janeiro, Brazil	7th	Hammer throw	71.90 m
2017	World Championships	London, United Kingdom	10th	Hammer throw	69.43 m
2017	Universiade	Taipei, Taiwan	2nd	Hammer throw	74.93 m
2018	European Championships	Berlin, Germany	4th (q)	Hammer throw	72.39 m^{1}
2019	World Championships	Doha, Qatar	10th	Hammer throw	71.24 m
2021	Olympic Games	Tokyo, Japan	13th (q)	Hammer throw	70.80 m

^{1}No mark in the final
