= Mariana Marcelino =

Brazilian athlete (born 1992)

Personal information
- Full name: Mariana Grasielly Marcelino
- Born: 16 July 1992 (age 33)
- Education: Santa Anna University Centre
- Height: 1.70 m (5 ft 7 in)
- Weight: 84 kg (185 lb)

Sport
- Sport: Athletics
- Event: Hammer throw

Mariana Grasielly Marcelino (born 16 July 1992) is a Brazilian athlete specialising in the hammer throw. She has won a gold medal at the 2017 South American Championships.

Her personal best in the event is 67.02 metres set in São Bernardo do Campo in 2017. This is the current national record.

== International competitions ==
Year	Competition	Venue	Position	Event	Notes
Representing Brazil
2008	South American Youth Championships	Lima, Peru	2nd	Shot put	13.45 m
2008	South American Youth Championships	Lima, Peru	2nd	Hammer throw	47.80 m
2009	World Youth Championships	Brixen, Italy	7th	Shot put	13.65 m
2011	Pan American Junior Championships	Miramar, United States	5th	Hammer throw	51.77 m
2011	South American Junior Championships	Medellín, Colombia	9th	Hammer throw	3.25 m
2012	South American U23 Championships	São Paulo, Brazil	2nd	Hammer throw	61.66 m
2014	Ibero-American Championships	São Paulo, Brazil	6th	Hammer throw	58.10 m
2014	South American U23 Championships	Montevideo, Uruguay	2nd	Hammer throw	61.18 m
2016	Ibero-American Championships	Rio de Janeiro, Brazil	3rd	Hammer throw	60.91 m
2017	South American Championships	Asunción, Paraguay	1st	Hammer throw	66.83 m
2017	Universiade	Taipei, Taiwan	7th	Hammer throw	65.39 m
2018	South American Games	Cochabamba, Bolivia	4th	Hammer throw	66.01 m
2018	Ibero-American Championships	Trujillo, Peru	6th	Hammer throw	65.78 m
2019	South American Championships	Lima, Peru	1st	Hammer throw	66.78 m
2019	Pan American Games	Lima, Peru	4th	Hammer throw	66.15 m
2021	South American Championships	Guayaquil, Ecuador	1st	Hammer throw	66.16 m
2022	Ibero-American Championships	La Nucía, Spain	2nd	Hammer throw	64.51 m
2022	World Championships	Eugene, United States	29th (q)	Hammer throw	64.72 m
2022	South American Games	Asunción, Paraguay	4th	Hammer throw	59.79 m
2023	South American Championships	São Paulo, Brazil	8th	Hammer throw	59.76 m
2023	Pan American Games	Santiago, Chile	9th	Hammer throw	58.32 m
2024	Ibero-American Championships	Cuiabá, Brazil	6th	Hammer throw	61.62 m
2025	South American Championships	Mar del Plata, Argentina	4th	Hammer throw	61.85 m
