= Joanna Fiodorow =

Polish hammer thrower (born 1989)

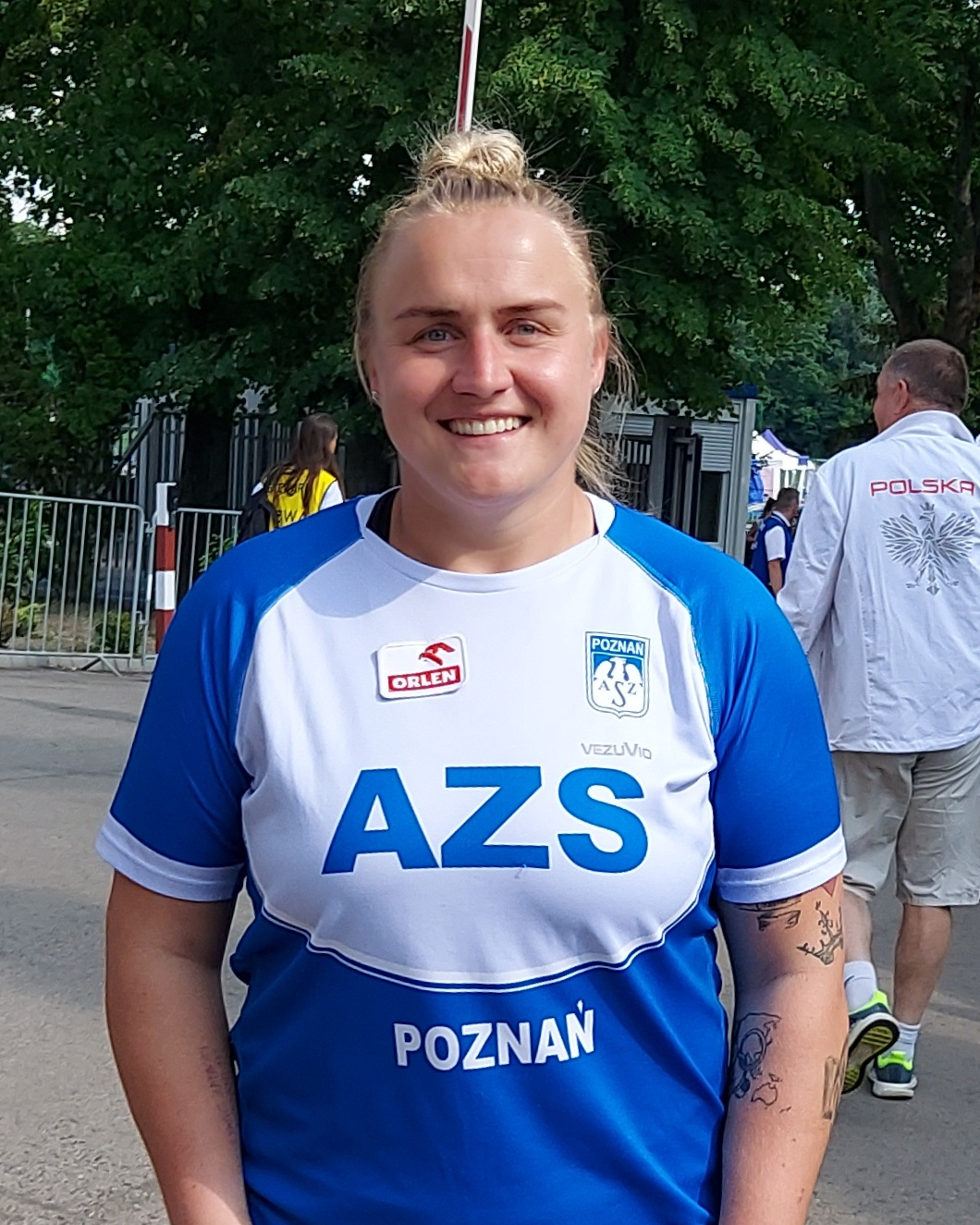

Personal information
- Nationality: Polish
- Born: 4 March 1989 (age 37) Augustów, Poland
- Height: 1.69 m (5 ft 7 in)
- Weight: 90 kg (198 lb)

Sport
- Country: Poland
- Sport: Athletics
- Event: Hammer throw
- Club: AZS Poznań
Medal record
Women's athletics
Representing Poland
World Championships
Silver medal – second place	2019 Doha	Hammer throw
European Championships
Bronze medal – third place	2014 Zürich	Hammer throw
Bronze medal – third place	2018 Berlin	Hammer throw
European Team Championships
Silver medal – second place	2014 Braunschweig	Hammer throw
Silver medal – second place	2019 Bydgoszcz	Hammer throw
European Cup Winter Throwing
Gold medal – first place	2014 Split	Hammer throws
European U23 Championships
Silver medal – second place	2011 Ostrava	Hammer throw
Summer Universiade
Silver medal – second place	2015 Gwangju	Hammer throw
Bronze medal – third place	2017 Taipei	Hammer throw

Joanna Fiodorow (born 4 March 1989) is a Polish retired athlete who specialized in the hammer throw.

In 2014 she won the bronze medal at the European Championships with a throw of 73.67 m.

She competed at the 2012 Olympic Games in London and the 2016 Olympic Games in Rio, taking 9th place in both finals.

Her personal best throw is 76.35 meters, achieved during 2019 World Championships in Doha.

In 2012 she was coached by Czesław Cybulski. After retiring in 2021 she became the coach of Wojciech Nowicki.

== Competition record ==
Year	Competition	Venue	Position	Notes
Representing Poland
2008	World Junior Championships	Bydgoszcz, Poland	19th (q)	54.36 m
2009	European U23 Championships	Kaunas, Lithuania	4th	62.49 m
2011	European U23 Championships	Ostrava, Czech Republic	2nd	70.06 m
2011	Universiade	Shenzhen, China	9th	63.40 m
2011	World Championships	Daegu, South Korea	21st (q)	66.88 m
2012	Olympic Games	London, United Kingdom	10th	72.37 m
2014	European Championships	Zürich, Switzerland	3rd	73.67 m
2015	Universiade	Gwangju, South Korea	2nd	69.69 m
2015	World Championships	Beijing, China	17th (q)	68.72 m
2016	European Championships	Amsterdam, Netherlands	10th	69.48 m
2016	Olympic Games	Rio de Janeiro, Brazil	9th	69.87 m
2017	World Championships	London, United Kingdom	6th	73.04 m
2017	Universiade	Taipei, Taiwan	3rd	71.33 m
2018	European Championships	Berlin, Germany	3rd	74.00 m
2019	World Championships	Doha, Qatar	2nd	76.35 m
2021	Olympic Games	Tokyo, Japan	7th	73.83 m
