= Réka Gyurátz =

Hungarian hammer thrower (born 1996)

Personal information
- Born: 31 May 1996 (age 30) Szombathely, Hungary
- Education: Eötvös Loránd University

Sport
- Country: Hungary
- Sport: Track and field
- Events: Hammer throw, discus throw
- Club: Dobó SE
- Coached by: László Németh; Zsolt Németh
- Updated on 29 August 2015

Réka Gyurátz (born 31 May 1996) is a Hungarian athlete specialising in the hammer throw. She competed at the 2015 World Championships in Beijing without qualifying for the final. In addition she won the gold medal at the 2013 World Youth Championships and the silver at the 2014 World Junior Championships. She also sometimes competes in the discus throw.

Her personal best in the hammer is 72.70 metres set in Budapest in 2019.

== Competition record ==
Year	Competition	Venue	Position	Event	Notes
Representing Hungary
2012	World Junior Championships	Barcelona, Spain	8th	Hammer throw	60.88 m
2013	World Youth Championships	Donetsk, Ukraine	1st	Hammer throw (3 kg)	73.20 m
2013	European Junior Championships	Rieti, Italy	2nd	Hammer throw	65.01 m
2014	World Junior Championships	Eugene, United States	29th (q)	Discus throw	42.70 m
2014	World Junior Championships	Eugene, United States	2nd	Hammer throw	64.68 m
2014	European Championships	Zürich, Switzerland	20th (q)	Hammer throw	62.14 m
2015	European Junior Championships	Eskilstuna, Sweden	5th	Hammer throw	62.94 m
2015	World Championships	Beijing, China	19th (q)	Hammer throw	68.26 m
2017	European U23 Championships	Bydgoszcz, Poland	4th	Hammer throw	66.67 m
2017	World Championships	London, United Kingdom	16th (q)	Hammer throw	67.48 m
2017	Universiade	Taipei, Taiwan	9th	Hammer throw	64.14 m
2018	European Championships	Berlin, Germany	9th	Hammer throw	70.48 m
2019	Universiade	Naples, Italy	4th	Hammer throw	69.51 m
2019	World Championships	Doha, Qatar	23rd (q)	Hammer throw	67.41 m
2021	Olympic Games	Tokyo, Japan	26th (q)	Hammer throw	66.48 m
2022	European Championships	Munich, Germany	7th	Hammer throw	69.02 m
2023	World Championships	Budapest, Hungary	33rd (q)	Hammer throw	66.81 m
2024	European Championships	Rome, Italy	12th	Hammer throw	66.68 m
2024	Olympic Games	Paris, France	30th (q)	Hammer throw	64.77 m
