= Sara Fantini =

Italian hammer thrower (born 1997)

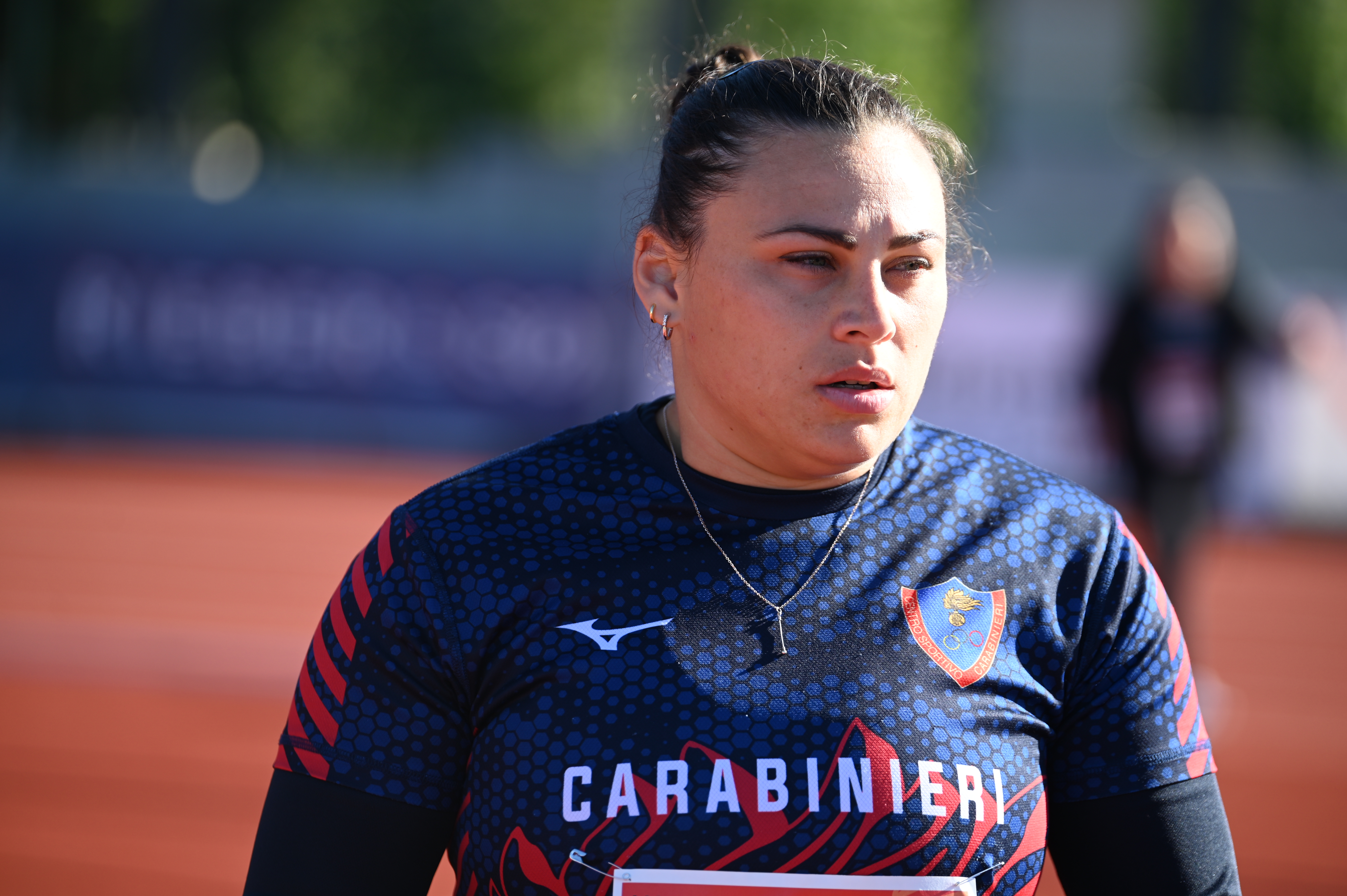
- Fantini in 2026

Personal information
- National team: Italy: 7 caps (2017-2021)
- Born: 16 September 1997 (age 28) Fidenza
- Height: 1.70 m (5 ft 7 in)
- Weight: 72 kg (159 lb)

Sport
- Sport: Athletics
- Event: Hammer throw
- Coached by: Marinella Vaccari

Achievements and titles
- Personal best: Hammer throw: 75.77 m (2022)
Medal record
Women's athletics
Representing Italy
European Championships
Gold medal – first place	2024 Rome	Hammer throw
Silver medal – second place	2026 Birmingham	Hammer throw
Bronze medal – third place	2022 Munich	Hammer throw
European Games
Gold medal – first place	2023 Kraków-Małopolska	Hammer throw
European Throwing Cup
Gold medal – first place	2023 Leiria	Hammer throw
Bronze medal – third place	2022 Leiria	Hammer throw
Bronze medal – third place	2025 Nicosia	Hammer Throw
European U23 Championships
Bronze medal – third place	2019 Gävle	Hammer throw
Mediterranean Games
Gold medal – first place	2026 Taranto	Hammer throw

Sara Fantini (born 16 September 1997) is an Italian hammer thrower European champion at Roma 2024.

== Career ==
Fantini has won 14 national championships at senior level, and ranked in the top 60, at 51st place, on the IAAF world leading list at the end of the 2017 outdoor season. She is the daughter of the former shot putter Corrado Fantini.

In 2019, Fantini's personal record 70.30 m, ranking 32nd of the world lists of the year. This qualified her for the IAAF for the 2019 World Athletics Championships. Fantini's national record under 23, ranks her 4th best all-time Italian performance.

Fantini competed at the 2020 Summer Olympics in hammer throw. She threw 71.68, placing 12th at the event.

Fantini competed at the 2024 Summer Olympics in the hammer throw. She threw 69.58 meters, placing 12th at the event.

=== National records ===
- Hammer throw: 75.77 m, ( (Spain) Madrid, 18 June 2022) - Current holder
- Hammer throw under-23: 70.30 m ( (Italy) Livorno, 29 June 2019)

=== Progression ===
Her personal best is 75.77 m established in 2022.

Updated to 15 June 2024.

Personal best

Year	Time	Venue	Date	World Rank
2014	55.60	(Italy) Milan	27/09/2014	
2015	61.75	(Italy) Jesolo	26/09/2015	
2016	62.44	(Italy) Caorle	10/09/2016	
2017	68.24	(Italy) Modena	02/06/2017	
2018	66.06	(Italy) Modena	23/06/2018	
2019	70.30	(Italy) Livorno	29/06/2019	
2020	70.73	(Italy) Udine	08/08/2020	
2021	72.31	(Spain) Madrid	19/06/2021	
2022	75.77	(Spain) Madrid	18/06/2022	5
2023	73.85	(Hungary) Leiria	24/08/2023	14
2024	74.18	(Italy) Rome	10/06/2024	9

=== Achievements ===
Year	Competition	Venue	Position	Event	Measure	Notes
2016	World U20 Championships	(Poland) Bydgoszcz	7th	Hammer throw	59.56 m	(Note: She throwed a better measure (61.62 m) in qualification)
2017	European U23 Championships	(Poland) Bydgoszcz	11th	Hammer throw	63.38 m	(Note: She throwed a better measure (67.55 m) in qualification)
2017	Universiade	(Taiwan) Taipei	12th	Hammer throw	60.82 m	(Note: She throwed a better measure (62.92 m) in qualification)
2019	European U23 Championships	(Sweden) Gävle	3rd	Hammer throw	68.35 m	
2019	World Championships	(Qatar) Doha	26th	Hammer throw	66.58 m	
2021	European Throwing Cup	(Croatia) Split	5th	Hammer throw	70.21 m	SB
2022	European Championships	(Germany) Munich	3rd	Hammer throw	71.58 m	(Note: She throws 73.40 m (Q) in qualify)
2024	European Championships	(Italy) Rome	1st	Hammer throw	74.18 m	SB

=== National titles ===
Fantini has won 18 national championships.

- Italian Athletics Championships
  - Hammer throw: 2017, 2018, 2019, 2020, 2021, 2022, 2023, 2024, 2025 (9)
- Italian Winter Throwing Championships
  - Hammer throw: 2017, 2018, 2019, 2021, 2022, 2023, 2024, 2025, 2026 (6)

== See also ==
- Italian all-time lists - Hammer throw
