= Bianca Ghelber =

Romanian hammer thrower (born 1990)

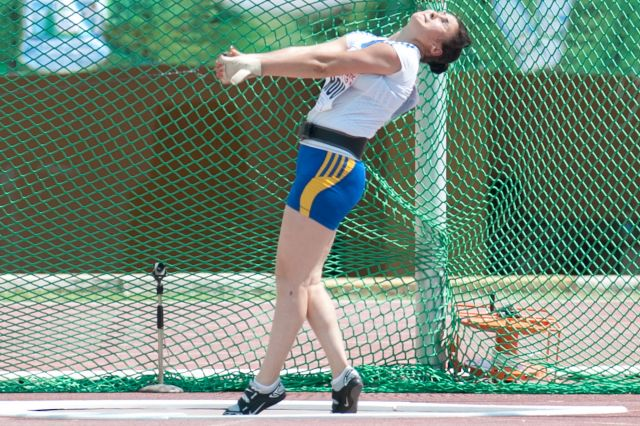
- Perie at the 2011 European Team Championships

Personal information
- Nationality: Romanian
- Born: Bianca Florentina Perie; 1 June 1990 (age 36) Roman, Romania
- Height: 1.70 m (5 ft 7 in)
- Weight: 75 kg (165 lb)

Sport
- Sport: Track and field
- Event: Hammer throw

Achievements and titles
- Personal best: Hammer throw: 74.18 m (2021)
Medal record
Women's athletics
Representing Romania
European Championships
Gold medal – first place	2022 Munich	Hammer throw
European Games
Silver medal – second place	2023 Kraków-Małopolska	Hammer throw
Summer Universiade
Bronze medal – third place	2011 Shenzhen	Hammer throw
World Junior Championships
Gold medal – first place	2008 Bydgoszcz	Hammer throw
- Updated on 19 May 2012

Bianca Florentina Ghelber (née Perie; born 1 June 1990) is a Romanian hammer thrower. Her personal best throw is 74.18 metres, achieved in August at Tokyo Olympics 2020.

== Career ==
Ghelber was born in Roman, Romania. As a junior, she was dominant in her field. She won gold medals at the 2005 World Youth Championships, the 2006 World Junior Championships, the 2007 World Youth Championships, the 2007 European Junior Championships and the 2008 World Junior Championships. She also competed at the 2007 World Championships and the 2008 and 2012 Olympic Games without reaching the final.

Ghelber participated in the women's hammer throw at the 2024 Summer Olympics. She threw 72.36 meters, placing 9th at the event.

== Achievements ==
Year	Competition	Venue	Position	Notes
Representing Romania
2005	World Youth Championships	Marrakesh, Morocco	1st	62.27 m
2006	World Junior Championships	Beijing, China	1st	67.38 m
2007	World Youth Championships	Ostrava, Czech Republic	1st	64.61 m
2007	European Junior Championships	Hengelo, Netherlands	1st	64.35 m
2007	World Championships	Osaka, Japan	27th (q)	64.18 m
2008	World Junior Championships	Bydgoszcz, Poland	1st	67.95 m
2008	Olympic Games	Beijing, China	18th (q)	68.21 m
2009	Universiade	Belgrade, Serbia	6th	68.16 m
2009	World Championships	Berlin, Germany	19th (q)	68.47 m
2009	Jeux de la Francophonie	Beirut, Lebanon	2nd	67.67 m
2010	European Championships	Barcelona, Spain	4th	71.62 m
2011	European U23 Championships	Ostrava, Czech Republic	1st	71.59 m
2011	Universiade	Shenzhen, China	3rd	71.18 m
2011	World Championships	Daegu, South Korea	6th	72.04 m
2012	European Championships	Helsinki, Finland	10th	67.24 m
2012	Olympic Games	London, United Kingdom	22nd (q)	68.34 m
2013	Universiade	Kazan, Russia	5th	68.94 m
2013	World Championships	Moscow, Russia	11th	71.25 m
2013	Jeux de la Francophonie	Nice, France	2nd	70.41 m
2014	European Championships	Zurich, Switzerland	7th	69.26 m
2017	Jeux de la Francophonie	Abidjan, Ivory Coast	1st	67.79 m
2017	World Championships	London, United Kingdom	24th (q)	65.07 m
2018	European Championships	Berlin, Germany	19th (q)	66.17 m
2019	World Championships	Doha, Qatar	18th (q)	68.65 m
2021	Olympic Games	Tokyo, Japan	6th	74.18 m
2022	World Championships	Eugene, United States	6th	72.26 m
2022	European Championships	Munich, Germany	1st	72.72 m
2023	Jeux de la Francophonie	Kinshasa, DR Congo	1st	73.20 m
2023	World Championships	Budapest, Hungary	7th	73.70 m
2024	European Championships	Rome, Italy	20th (q)	66.70 m
2024	Olympic Games	Paris, France	9th	72.36 m
2025	World Championships	Tokyo, Japan	17th (q)	69.61 m
