= Athletics at the 2023 Pan American Games – Women's hammer throw =

Women's hammer throw at the 2023 Pan American Games
- Venue: Julio Martínez National Stadium
- Dates: November 1
- Competitors: 11 from 10 nations
- Winning distance: 72.34

Medalists
Gold medal	DeAnna Price	United States
Silver medal	Rosa Rodríguez	Venezuela
Bronze medal	Kaila Butler	Canada

The women's hammer throw competition of the athletics events at the 2023 Pan American Games was held on November 1 at the Julio Martínez National Stadium of Santiago, Chile.

== Records ==
Prior to this competition, the existing world and Pan American Games records were as follows:

World record	Anita Wlodarczyk (POL)	82.98	Warsaw, Poland	August 28, 2016
Pan American Games record	Yipsi Moreno (CUB)	75.62	Guadalajara, Mexico	October 24, 2011

== Schedule ==
Date	Time	Round
November 1, 2023	17:31	Final

== Results ==
All times shown are in seconds.

KEY:	NR	National record	PB	Personal best	SB	Seasonal best	DQ	Disqualified

=== Final ===
The results were as follows:

Rank	Name	Nationality	#1	#2	#3	#4	#5	#6	Mark	Notes
1st place, gold medalist(s)	DeAnna Price	United States	72.34	X	69.62	X	70.35	72.34	72.34	
2nd place, silver medalist(s)	Rosa Rodríguez	Venezuela	71.24	69.69	68.14	X	X	71.59	71.59	
3rd place, bronze medalist(s)	Kaila Butler	Canada	X	X	63.22	X	65.10	64.01	65.10	
4	Mayra Gaviria	Colombia	64.42	61.18	62.22	X	X	X	64.42	
5	Mariana García	Chile	62.74	61.49	61.10	X	X	60.49	62.74	
6	Yaritza Martínez	Cuba	58.92	61.02	X	X	X	58.96	61.02	
7	Daniela Gómez	Argentina	55.95	60.26	55.42	55.86	X	X	60.26	
8	Ximena Zorrilla	Peru	59.99	X	X	X	X	X	59.99	
9	Mariana Marcelino	Brazil	55.46	X	58.32				58.32	
10	Nereida Santacruz	Ecuador	57.69	X	X				57.69	
	Brooke Andersen	United States	X	X	X				NM	
