= Jessika Guehaseim =

French hammer thrower (born 1989)

Personal information
- Nationality: French
- Born: 23 August 1989 (age 36) Montpellier, France

Sport
- Country: France
- Sport: Athletics
- Event: Hammer throw

Achievements and titles
- Personal best: Hammer throw: 70.44 m (2012)
Medal record
Mediterranean Games
Gold medal – first place	2013 Mersin	Hammer throw

Jessika Guehaseim (born 23 August 1989) is a former French hammer thrower, a journalist and a Rugby League player.

== Biography ==
Guehaseim won the gold medal at the 2013 Mediterranean Games.

== Achievements ==
Year	Competition	Venue	Position	Event	Notes
Representing France
2008	World Junior Championships	Bydgoszcz, Poland	15th (q)	Hammer	57.53 m
2011	European U23 Championships	Ostrava, Czech Republic	5th	Hammer	67.09 m
2013	Mediterranean Games	(Turkey) Mersin	1st	Hammer throw	67.14 m

=== Personal Bests ===
Records personnels
Event	Performance	Location	Date
Hammer Throw	70.44m	Aix-les-Bains	6 June 2012

== See also ==
- France at the 2013 Mediterranean Games
