= Ida Storm =

Swedish hammer thrower

Personal information
- Nationality: Swedish
- Born: 11 October 1991 (age 34)

Sport
- Sport: Athletics
- Event: Hammer throw

Ida Storm (born 11 October 1991) is a Swedish hammer thrower. She competed in the women's hammer throw at the 2017 World Championships in Athletics.

Storm was an All-American thrower for the UCLA Bruins track and field team, finishing runner-up in the weight throw at the 2012, 2013, and 2015 NCAA Division I Indoor Track and Field Championships.
