= Jenny Ozorai =

Hungarian athlete

Personal information
- Nationality: Hungarian
- Born: December 3, 1990 (age 35) Ajka, Hungary

Sport
- Country: Hungary
- Sport: hammer throw, discus throw
Medal record
Representing Hungary
Women's Hammer throw
European Cup Winter Throwing
Silver medal – second place	2010 Arles	U23 Hammer throw
European Athletics Championships
Silver medal – second place	2009 Novi Sad	Hammer throw
World Junior Championships in Athletics
Bronze medal – third place	2008 Bydgoszcz	Hammer throw

Jenny Ozorai (born 3 December 1990) is a Hungarian female hammer thrower and discus thrower. She competed at the 2008 World Junior Athletics Championships. She claimed the bronze medal, her first international medal in the women's hammer throw. She has also represented Hungary in the senior level especially participated at the 2013 Summer Universiade.

She has also clinched 2 silver medals at the Hungarian Athletics Championships in 2009 and in 2012. Jenny graduated from the University of Southern California.
