= Julia Ratcliffe =

New Zealand hammer thrower

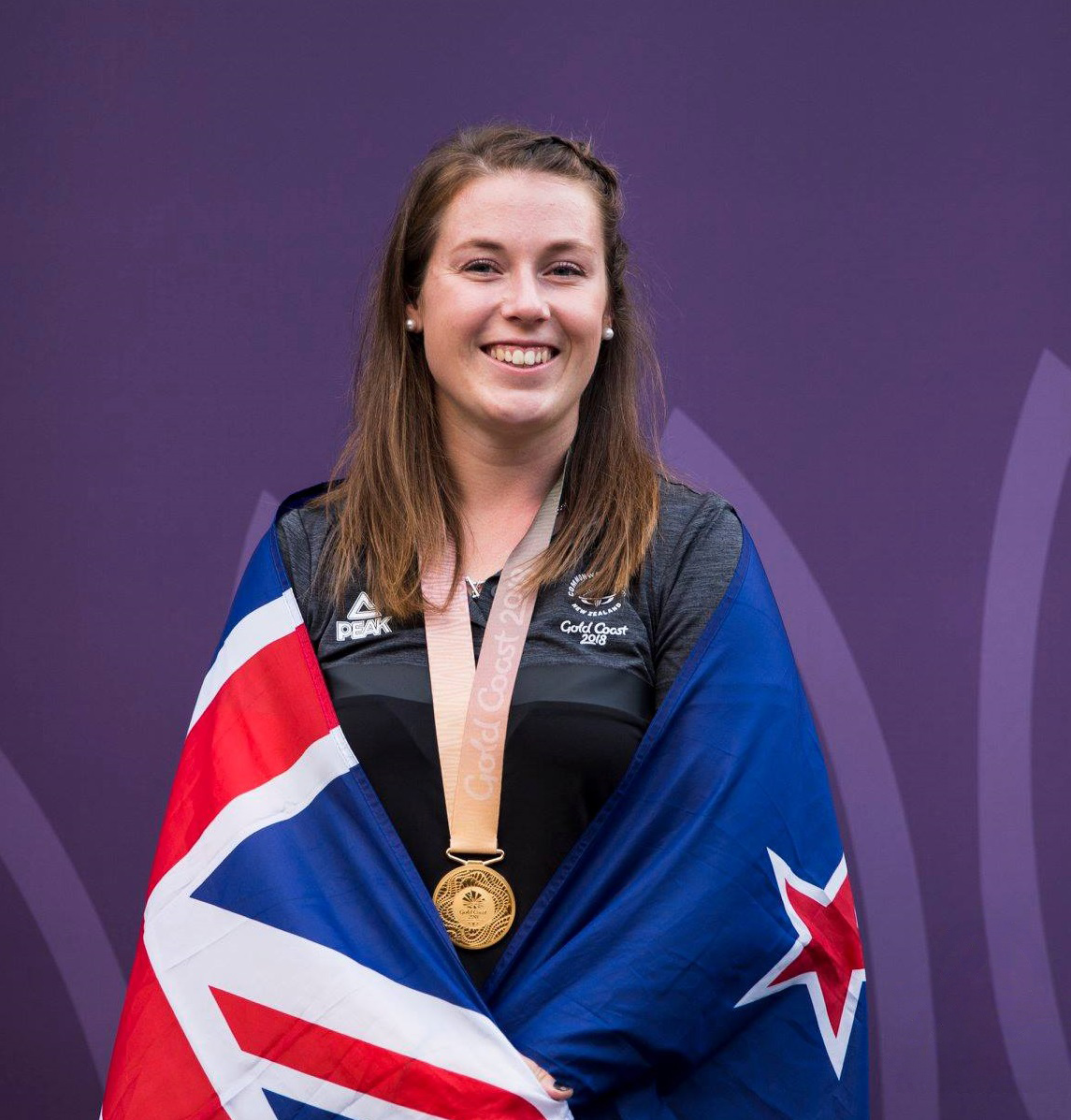
- Ratcliffe with 2018 Commonwealth Games gold medal

Personal information
- Born: 14 July 1993 (age 33) Hamilton, New Zealand
- Education: Princeton University
- Height: 1.69 m (5 ft 7 in)
- Weight: 80 kg (176 lb)

Sport
- Country: New Zealand
- Sport: Track and field athletics
- Event: Hammer throw
- College team: Princeton Tigers
- Club: Hamilton City Hawks
- Coached by: Dave Ratcliffe
Medal record
Track and field
Representing New Zealand
Commonwealth Games
Gold medal – first place	2018 Gold Coast	Hammer Throw
Silver medal – second place	2014 Glasgow	Hammer Throw
Silver medal – second place	2022 Birmingham	Hammer Throw
Oceania Championships
Gold medal – first place	2019 Townsville	Hammer Throw
World University Games
Bronze medal – third place	2015 Gwangju	Hammer Throw
Oceania Youth Championships
Gold medal – first place	2010 Sydney	Hammer Throw
Australian Youth Olympic Festival
Gold medal – first place	2009 Sydney	Hammer throw

Julia Ratcliffe (born 14 July 1993) is a retired New Zealand track and field athlete who specialised in the hammer throw. She won the gold medal at the 2018 Commonwealth Games in the Gold Coast, and won silver medals at both the 2014 Commonwealth Games and 2022 Commonwealth Games.

== Personal life ==
Ratcliffe was born in Hamilton to Dave and Sue Ratcliffe, and has one older sister, Sarah. She attended Waikato Diocesan School for Girls, where she was head girl and dux in her final year. In her youth, she participated in various sports including hockey, netball, and hurdling.

Ratcliffe attended Princeton University in New Jersey, United States. She graduated in 2017 with a Bachelor of Arts, with a major in economics and a certificate in political economy. As of April 2020, she works as an economic analyst for the Reserve Bank of New Zealand.

== Career ==
Ratcliffe began participating in hammer throw at age 12.

In 2014, Ratcliffe won the NCAA hammer throw title, becoming Princeton University's first female track and field NCAA champion.

Ratcliffe held the New Zealand national record in the hammer throw from July 2012 until September 2020. She reclaimed the national title in March 2021, setting a new national record of 73.55 metres at the New Zealand Track and Field Championships.

In April 2021, Ratcliffe was selected to compete at the 2020 Summer Olympics in Tokyo.

Ratcliffe announced her retirement on 13 January 2023.

== Statistics ==
=== Annual progression ===
Year	Performance	Competition	Location	Date
2008	48.05 m	Battle of the Cities 4	North Shore, New Zealand	29 November
2009	55.64 m	Mini-Hot Meet	North Shore, New Zealand	6 June
2010	61.32 m	Open meeting	Hamilton, New Zealand	4 December
2011	62.28 m	Porritt Classic	Hamilton, New Zealand	19 February
2012	67.00 m	World Junior Championships	Barcelona, Spain	14 July
2013	68.80 m NR	Larry Ellis Invitational	Princeton, United States	19 April
2014	70.28 m NR	Larry Ellis Invitational	Princeton, United States	19 April
2015	68.53 m	ECAC	Princeton, United States	16 May
2016	70.75 m NR	Southern League	London, United Kingdom	9 July
2017	70.35 m	NY Hammer Series #7	Princeton, United States	16 July
2018	69.94 m	Commonwealth Games	Gold Coast, Australia	10 April
2019	71.39 m AR	Oceania Championships	Townsville, Australia	28 June
2020	72.35 m AR	Porritt Classic	Hamilton, New Zealand	15 February
2021	73.55 m AR	New Zealand National Championships	Hastings, New Zealand	26 March

Source: Athletics New Zealand Records & Rankings

=== International results ===
Year	Event	Location	Place
2008	Pacific School Games	Canberra	1st
2009	Australian Youth Olympic Festival	Sydney	1st
2009	IAAF World Youth Championships	Brixen	10th
2010	Oceania Youth Championships	Sydney	1st
2010	Youth Olympic Games	Singapore	11th
2012	Bauhaus Junioren-Gala	Mannheim	1st
2012	IAAF World Junior Championships	Barcelona	4th
2013	World University Games	Kazan	8th
2014	Commonwealth Games	Glasgow	2nd
2015	World University Games	Gwangju	3rd
2017	IAAF World Championships	London	26th
2017	World University Games	Taipei	11th
2018	Commonwealth Games	Gold Coast	1st
2019	Oceania Championships in Athletics	Townsville	1st
2019	IAAF World Athletics Championships	Doha	14th
2021	Summer Olympics	Tokyo	9th
2022	World Athletics Championships	Eugene	16th
2022	Commonwealth Games	Birmingham	2nd
