= Iryna Klymets =

Ukrainian hammer thrower

Personal information
- Born: 4 October 1994 (age 31) Chetvertnia, Ukraine

Sport
- Country: Ukraine
- Sport: Athletics
- Event: Hammer throw

Iryna Volodymyrivna Klymets (Ukrainian: Ірина Володимирівна Климець) (born 4 October 1994 in Chetvertnia) is a Ukrainian hammer thrower.

== Career ==
She competed at the 2016 Summer Olympics in the women's hammer throw event; her result of 62.75 meters in the qualification round did not qualify her for the final round.
