= 2025 World Athletics Championships – Women's hammer throw =

Women's hammer throw at the 2025 World Athletics Championships
- Venue: National Stadium
- Location: Tokyo, Japan
- Dates: 14 September (qualification); 15 September (final)
- Competitors: 36 from 25 nations
- Winning distance: 80.51 m AR, WL

Medalists
gold medal	Camryn Rogers	Canada
silver medal	Zhao Jie	China
bronze medal	Zhang Jiale	China

The women's hammer throw at the 2025 World Athletics Championships was held at the National Stadium in Tokyo on 14 and 15 September 2025.

== Summary ==
Reigning Olympic champion Camryn Rogers was back to defend her 2023 title. Brooke Andersen came in as the world leader and was the 2022 World Champion. In 2023 Andersen became only the third woman to throw over 80 metres. The second woman to throw over 80 from 2021, DeAnna Price, the 2019 champion is also entered. World record holder, four time World champion, triple Olympic Gold medalist Anita Włodarczyk, was back again at 40 having set the Masters W40 world record earlier in the year. And she wasn't the oldest in the competition as 2008 Olympic Gold medalist, three time World xhampion Yipsi Moreno is also entered two months shy of her 45th birthday. Those five names pretty much represent gold medals at major championships this century. Neither Moreno or Andersen made it out of the qualification round. Three straight fouls is a situation that has plagued Andersen before. Zhao Jie, Silja Kosonen and Rogers hit the 74 metre auto qualifier on their first attempt. Price made it on her second.

As first thrower in the final, Rogers landed a 78.09 m, which no other competitor would surpass. Kosonen was next up, tossing a 74.66 m. That was dropped to third place when Zhang Jiale threw 76.22 m. At the end of the round, Zhao threw 76.54 m, pushing Zhang and Kosonen down. They didn't know it at the time, but that order would not change save a few seconds in the final round. The next thrower up was Rogers who unleashed an 80.51 m to become the second farthest thrower in history and the fourth over 80. Nothing changed until the final round, when Zhang popped a 77.10 m to move into second place. That last long enough for her teammate Zhao to step into the ring and throw half a metre further. It was a personal best and confirmed silver. Rogers used her final throw to go 79.11 m. Throughout the 6 rounds, Rogers had 4 throws that would have won the competition.

== Records ==
Before the competition records were as follows:

Record	Athlete & Nat.	Perf.	Location	Date
World record	Anita Włodarczyk (POL)	82.98 m	Warsaw, Poland	28 August 2016
Championship record	Anita Włodarczyk (POL)	80.85 m	Beijing, China	27 August 2015
World Leading	Brooke Andersen (USA)	79.29 m	Tucson, United States	24 May 2025
African Record	Annette Echikunwoke (NGR)	75.49 m	Tucson, United States	22 May 2021
Asian Record	Wang Zheng (CHN)	77.68 m	Chengdu, China	29 March 2014
European Record	Anita Włodarczyk (POL)	82.98 m	Warsaw, Poland	28 August 2016
North, Central American and Caribbean record	DeAnna Price (USA)	80.31 m	Eugene, United States	26 June 2021
Oceanian record	Lauren Bruce (NZL)	74.61 m	Tucson, United States	22 May 2021
South American Record	Jennifer Dahlgren (ARG)	73.74 m	Buenos Aires, Argentina	10 April 2010

== Qualification standard ==
The standard to qualify automatically for entry was 74.00 m.

== Schedule ==
The event schedule, in local time (UTC+9), is as follows:

Date	Time	Round
14 September	09:00	Qualification
15 September	21:00	Final

== Results ==
=== Qualification ===
All athletes over 74.00 m ( Q ) or at least the 12 best performers ( q ) advanced to the final.

==== Group A ====
Place	Athlete	Nation	Round			Mark	Notes
Place	Athlete	Nation	#1	#2	#3	Mark	Notes
1	Silja Kosonen	Finland	75.88			75.88 m	Q
2	DeAnna Price	United States	72.33	74.99		74.99 m	Q
3	Anita Włodarczyk	Poland	71.41	73.69	70.94	73.69 m	q
4	Zhang Jiale	China	70.37	x	72.02	72.02 m	q
5	Sara Fantini	Italy	71.06	70.73	67.30	71.06 m	q
6	Nicola Tuthill	Ireland	65.43	68.77	70.70	70.70 m	q
7	Rose Loga	France	69.03	70.28	70.44	70.44 m	
8	Bianca Ghelber	Romania	68.82	68.93	69.61	69.61 m	
9	Samantha Borutta	Germany	68.96	68.03	67.38	68.96 m	
10	Oyesade Olatoye	Nigeria	66.78	x	68.82	68.82 m	
11	Lara Roberts	Australia	68.55	67.97	67.63	68.55 m	
12	Nayoka Clunis	Jamaica	x	68.24	65.60	68.24 m	
13	Jillian Weir	Canada	67.98	x	67.20	67.98 m	
14	Katarzyna Furmanek	Poland	66.70	66.04	66.40	66.70 m	
15	Suvi Niiranen	Finland	66.37	x	x	66.37 m	
16	Valentina Savva	Cyprus	65.78	65.48	66.20	66.20 m	
17	Yipsi Moreno	Albania	65.38	x	x	65.38 m	
—	Brooke Andersen	United States	x	x	x	NM	

==== Group B ====
Place	Athlete	Nation	Round			Mark	Notes
Place	Athlete	Nation	#1	#2	#3	Mark	Notes
1	Camryn Rogers	Canada	77.52			77.52 m	Q
2	Zhao Jie	China	74.24			74.24 m	Q
3	Krista Tervo	Finland	x	x	73.73	73.73 m	q
4	Katrine Koch Jacobsen	Denmark	x	72.00	71.73	72.00 m	q
5	Janee' Kassanavoid	United States	71.33	71.95	70.65	71.95 m	q
6	Aileen Kuhn	Germany	69.55	70.85	x	70.85 m	q
7	Rebecka Hallerth	Sweden	67.41	70.43	x	70.43 m	SB
8	Beatrice Nedberge Llano	Norway	65.76	69.45	70.10	70.10 m	
9	Stamatia Scarvelis	Greece	70.05	67.18	x	70.05 m	
10	Anna Purchase	Great Britain & N.I.	x	69.35	x	69.35 m	
11	Lauren Bruce	New Zealand	x	69.19	x	69.19 m	
12	Stephanie Ratcliffe	Australia	x	66.70	68.42	68.42 m	
13	Ewa Różańska	Poland	x	68.28	68.34	68.34 m	
14	Zsanett Németh	Hungary	66.79	65.36	66.97	66.97 m	
15	Rachel Richeson	United States	x	66.95	x	66.95 m	
16	Iryna Klymets	Ukraine	x	66.58	66.52	66.58 m	
17	Zahra Tatar	Algeria	60.23	60.90	65.86	65.86 m	
18	Guðrún Karítas Hallgrímsdóttir	Iceland	63.45	64.24	64.94	64.94 m	

=== Final ===
Place	Athlete	Nation	Round						Mark	Notes
Place	Athlete	Nation	#1	#2	#3	#4	#5	#6	Mark	Notes
1st place, gold medalist(s)	Camryn Rogers	Canada	78.09	80.51	78.27	x	73.90	79.11	80.51 m	AR, WL
2nd place, silver medalist(s)	Zhao Jie	China	76.54	75.21	76.34	76.65	75.63	77.60	77.60 m	PB
3rd place, bronze medalist(s)	Zhang Jiale	China	76.22	68.02	x	74.54	x	77.10	77.10 m	
4	Silja Kosonen	Finland	74.66	74.94	74.16	75.28	73.79	x	75.28 m	
5	DeAnna Price	United States	74.45	72.47	x	73.32	75.10	71.37	75.10 m	
6	Anita Włodarczyk	Poland	72.32	73.44	72.81	x	74.64	73.42	74.64 m	
7	Sara Fantini	Italy	71.70	73.06	x	x	72.16		73.06 m	SB
8	Katrine Koch Jacobsen	Denmark	x	x	71.59	69.21	69.42		71.59 m	
9	Aileen Kuhn	Germany	69.30	69.64	71.57	70.52			71.57 m	
10	Janee' Kassanavoid	United States	x	35.43	70.35	70.10			70.35 m	
11	Nicola Tuthill	Ireland	69.49	68.52	69.33				69.49 m	
—	Krista Tervo	Finland	x	x	x				NM	
