= 2023 World Athletics Championships – Women's hammer throw =

Women's hammer throw at the 2023 World Championships
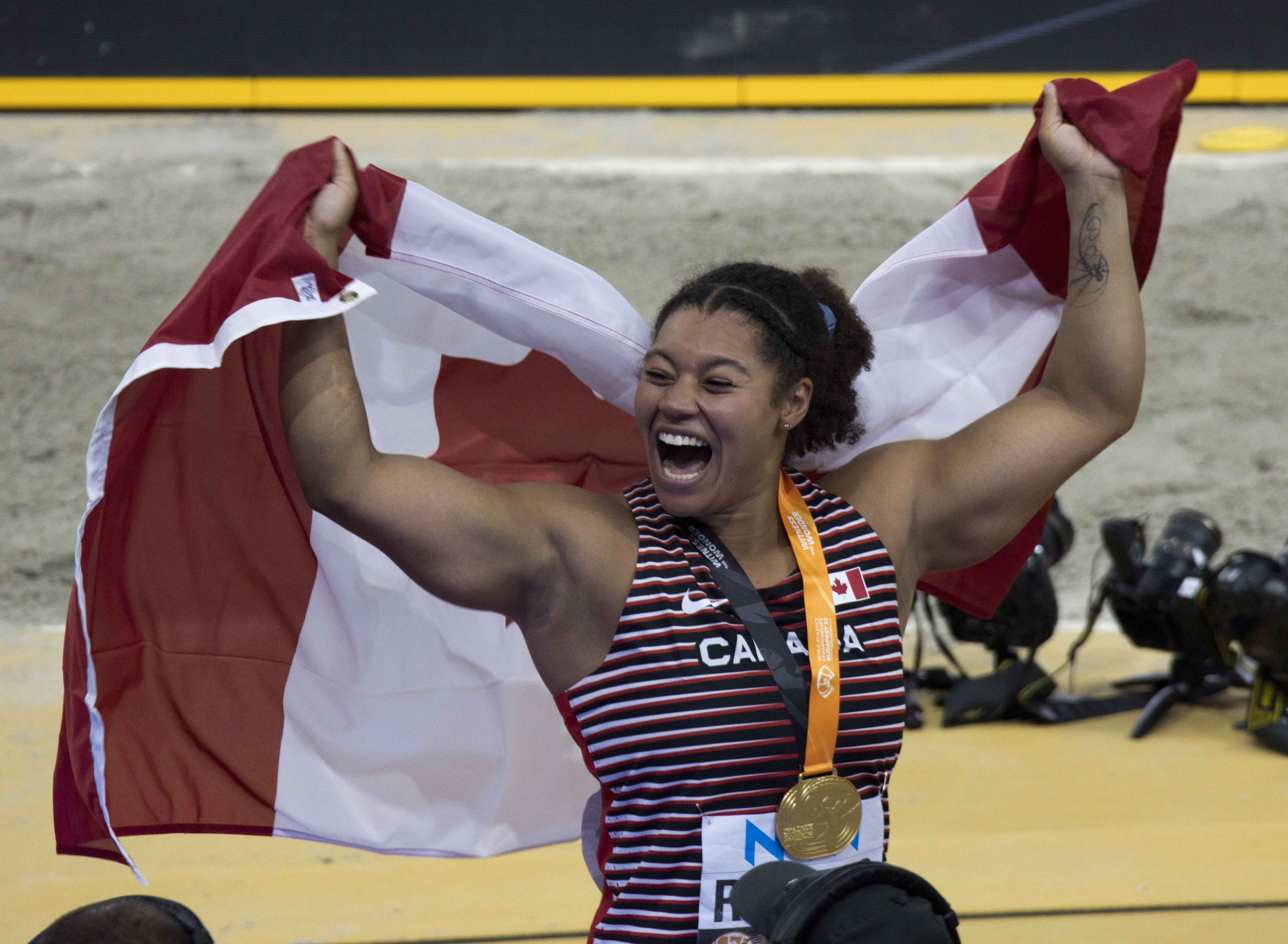
- Camryn Rogers shortly after winning the final.
- Venue: National Athletics Centre
- Dates: 23 August (Qualification); 24 August (Final)
- Competitors: 36 from 24 nations
- Winning distance: 77.22

Medalists
gold medal	Camryn Rogers	Canada
silver medal	Janee Kassanavoid	United States
bronze medal	DeAnna Price	United States

The women's hammer throw at the 2023 World Athletics Championships was held at the National Athletics Centre in Budapest on 23 and 24 August 2023.

== Summary ==
In the preliminary round, defending champion Brooke Andersen relinquished her opportunity to defend, struggling to put the hammer into the sector and only throwing 67.72m, almost 5 metres behind the last qualifying spot. Anita Włodarczyk was also unable to make the finals with a best of 71.17m.

Hanna Skydan had the first legal throw of the competition, 74.18m. Returning 4th place, Sara Fantini got close with a 73.89m At the end of the round, returning silver medalist Camryn Rogers launched a 77.22 m (253 ft 4 in) to take the lead. Starting the second round, the next thrower was returning bronze medalist Janee' Kassanavoid. Her 76.00m took over second place. Nobody else improved into the medals. Again in the third round, Kassanavoid improved to 76.36m while by the end of the round, seven women had thrown 73 metres or better, leaving Olympic silver medalist Wang Zheng in the last qualifying position. Barely one spot ahead of her, 2019 Champion DeAnna Price had only managed 73.28m but also qualified for three more throws. With the new life, in the fifth round, she spun a 75.41m to take the bronze medal position. Nobody was able to improve through the remaining two rounds.

Rogers threw consistently with four throws better than anyone else was able to produce in the competition.

== Records ==
Before the competition records were as follows:

Record	Athlete & Nat.	Perf.	Location	Date
World record	Anita Włodarczyk (POL)	82.98 m	Warsaw, Poland	28 August 2016
Championship record	Anita Włodarczyk (POL)	80.85 m	Beijing, China	27 August 2015
World Leading	Brooke Andersen (USA)	80.17 m	Tucson, United States	30 May 2023
African Record	Annette Echikunwoke (NGR)	75.49 m	Tucson, United States	22 May 2021
Asian Record	Wang Zheng (CHN)	77.68 m	Chengdu, China	29 March 2014
North, Central American and Caribbean record	DeAnna Price (USA)	80.31 m	Eugene, United States	26 June 2021
South American Record	Jennifer Dahlgren (ARG)	73.74 m	Buenos Aires, Argentina	10 April 2010
European Record	Anita Włodarczyk (POL)	82.98 m	Warsaw, Poland	28 August 2016
Oceanian record	Lauren Bruce (NZL)	74.61 m	Tucson, United States	22 May 2021

== Qualification standard ==
The standard to qualify automatically for entry was 73.60.

== Schedule ==
The event schedule, in local time (CEST), was as follows:

Date	Time	Round
23 August	19:00	Qualification
23 August	20:35	Qualification
24 August	19:00	Final

== Results ==
=== Qualification ===
Qualification: Qualifying Performance 73.00 (Q) or at least 12 best performers (q) advanced to the final.

Rank	Group	Name	Nationality	Round			Mark	Notes
Rank	Group	Name	Nationality	1	2	3	Mark	Notes
1	A	Hanna Skydan	Azerbaijan	77.10			77.10	Q, NR
2	A	DeAnna Price	United States	76.25			76.25	Q
3	B	Silja Kosonen	Finland	x	74.19		74.19	Q, PB
4	A	Camryn Rogers	Canada	70.97	73.95		73.95	Q
5	B	Bianca Florentina Ghelber	Romania	73.67			73.67	Q
6	A	Sara Fantini	Italy	73.28			73.28	Q, SB
7	A	Zhao Jie	China	69.13	73.23		73.23	Q, PB
8	B	Janee Kassanavoid	United States	71.04	x	72.70	72.70	q
9	A	Malwina Kopron	Poland	x	71.48	72.35	72.35	q, SB
10	A	Wang Zheng	China	66.73	71.93	71.08	71.93	q
11	B	Anna Purchase	Great Britain & N.I.	70.99	71.31	67.76	71.31	q
12	B	Katrine Koch Jacobsen	Denmark	70.63	71.25	70.32	71.25	q
13	B	Anita Włodarczyk	Poland	70.36	71.17	67.76	71.17	
14	B	Rosa Rodríguez	Venezuela	68.57	x	70.81	70.81	
15	A	Suvi Koskinen	Finland	67.78	70.81	67.83	70.81	
16	B	Ji Li	China	70.59	69.17	68.86	70.59	
17	B	Alexandra Tavernier	France	70.19	x	69.42	70.19	
18	A	Stephanie Ratcliffe	Australia	69.87	66.93	67.97	69.87	
19	B	Aleksandra Śmiech	Poland	67.33	x	69.76	69.76	
20	A	Charlotte Payne	Great Britain & N.I.	64.56	69.32	69.57	69.57	
21	B	Beatrice Nedberge Llano	Norway	69.11	67.98	66.57	69.11	
22	B	Grete Ahlberg	Sweden	68.51	66.94	69.05	69.05	
23	A	Krista Tervo	Finland	x	67.53	68.00	68.00	
24	A	Rose Loga	France	x	67.95	x	67.95	
25	B	Brooke Andersen	United States	x	x	67.72	67.72	
26	A	Stamatia Scarvelis	Greece	67.51	67.53	x	67.53	
27	B	Jillian Weir	Canada	65.97	65.14	67.48	67.48	
28	A	Lauren Bruce	New Zealand	67.10	67.04	x	67.10	
29	A	Laura Redondo	Spain	66.87	66.95	66.29	66.95	
30	B	Oyesade Olatoye	Nigeria	x	66.92	65.76	66.92	
31	B	Iryna Klymets	Ukraine	65.69	66.87	x	66.87	
32	A	Mayra Gaviria	Colombia	66.14	66.82	65.25	66.82	
33	B	Réka Gyurátz	Hungary	65.25	66.81	x	66.81	
34	A	Martina Hrašnová	Slovakia	57.17	64.83	66.28	66.28	
35	B	Nayoka Clunis	Jamaica	x	58.10	x	58.10	
	A	Jillian Shippee	United States	x	x	x	NM	

=== Final ===
The final was started on 24 August at 20:29.

Rank	Name	Nationality	Round						Mark	Notes
Rank	Name	Nationality	1	2	3	4	5	6	Mark	Notes
1st place, gold medalist(s)	Camryn Rogers	Canada	77.22	77.07	76.75	75.68	76.72	74.92	77.22	
2nd place, silver medalist(s)	Janee Kassanavoid	United States	x	76.00	76.36	73.13	75.27	75.06	76.36	
3rd place, bronze medalist(s)	DeAnna Price	United States	x	x	73.28	72.62	75.41	73.98	75.41	
4	Hanna Skydan	Azerbaijan	74.18	x	73.67	x	68.76	72.91	74.18	
5	Silja Kosonen	Finland	73.89	x	72.59	x	x	73.43	73.89	
6	Sara Fantini	Italy	71.94	73.85	69.42	71.79	71.82	x	73.85	SB
7	Bianca Florentina Ghelber	Romania	x	x	73.58	72.35	73.70	72.46	73.70	
8	Wang Zheng	China	70.29	72.14	x	x	x	x	72.14	
9	Katrine Koch Jacobsen	Denmark	69.89	71.33	70.04				71.33	SB
10	Zhao Jie	China	69.87	70.29	x				70.29	
11	Anna Purchase	Great Britain & N.I.	x	68.82	70.29				70.29	
	Malwina Kopron	Poland	x	x	x				NM	
