= 2024 Prefontaine Classic =

- Dates: 25 May 2024
- Host city: Eugene, Oregon, United States
- Venue: Hayward Field
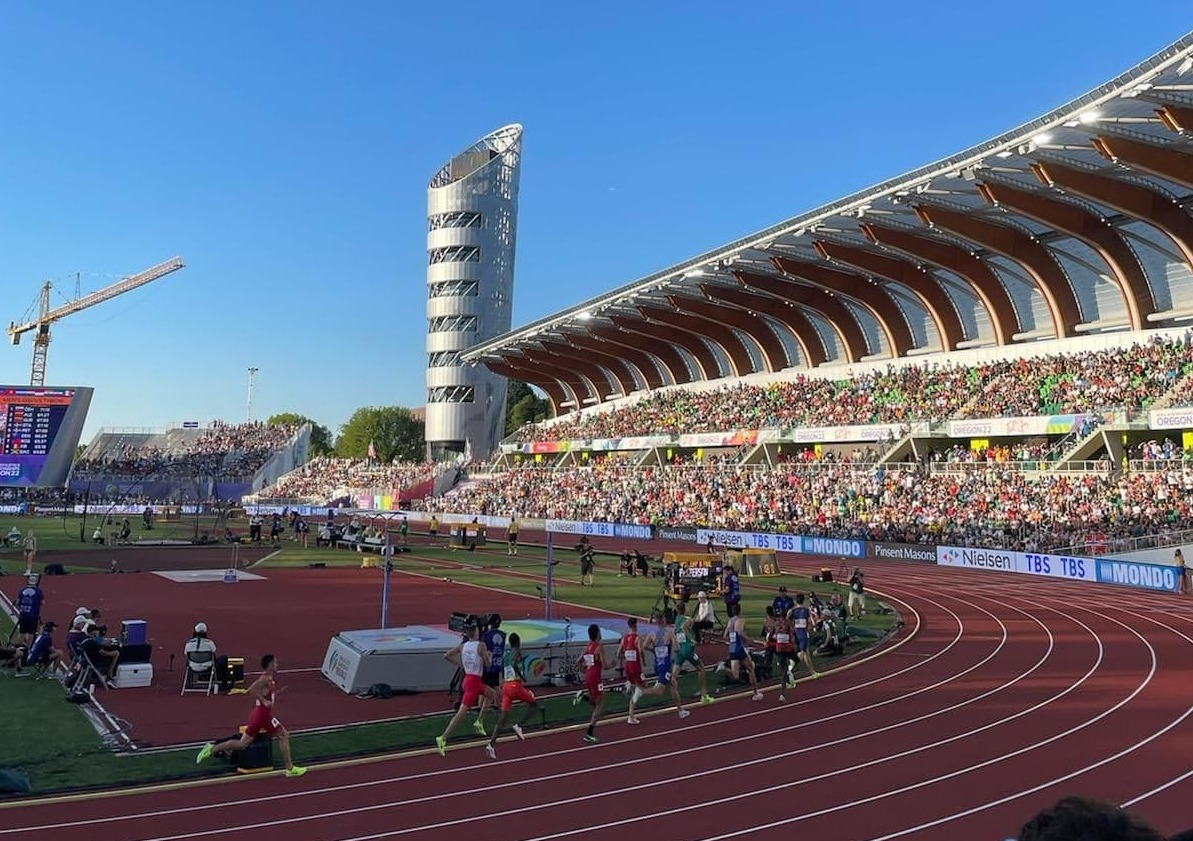
- Level: 2024 Diamond League

The 2024 Prefontaine Classic was the 49th edition of the annual outdoor track and field meeting in Eugene, Oregon, United States. Held on 25 May at Hayward Field, it was the 5th leg of the 2024 Diamond League – the highest-level international track and field circuit.

== Highlights ==
The meeting was highlighted by the Bowerman Mile. The race featured defending Olympic champion Jakob Ingebrigtsen as well as the last two world champions Josh Kerr and Jake Wightman against American mile record holder Yared Nuguse and 3000 m steeplechase world record holder Lamecha Girma. Kerr won the race in a new British record of 3:45.34.

Another highlight included a new world record in the women's 10,000 metres, set by Beatrice Chebet of Kenya in a time of 28:54.14.

== Results ==
Athletes competing in the Diamond League disciplines earned extra compensation and points which went towards qualifying for the 2024 Diamond League finals. First place earned 8 points, with each step down in place earning one less point than the previous, until no points are awarded in 9th place or lower. In the case of a tie, each tying athlete earns the full amount of points for the place.

=== Diamond Discipline ===
Men's 100 Metres (+1.2 m/s)
Place	Athlete	Age	Country	Time	Points
1st place, gold medalist(s)	Christian Coleman	28	United States	9.95	8
2nd place, silver medalist(s)	Ferdinand Omanyala	28	Kenya	9.98	7
3rd place, bronze medalist(s)	Brandon Hicklin	25	United States	10.08	6
4	Ackeem Blake	22	Jamaica	10.12	5
5	Sandrey Davison	21	Jamaica	10.13	4
6	Rikkoi Brathwaite	25	British Virgin Islands	10.19	3
7	Benjamin Azamati	26	Ghana	10.21	2
8	Hiroki Yanagita	20	Japan	10.26	1
9	Brandon Carnes	29	United States	10.33	

Men's 200 Metres (+1.8 m/s)
Place	Athlete	Age	Country	Time	Points
1st place, gold medalist(s)	Kenny Bednarek	25	United States	19.89	8
2nd place, silver medalist(s)	Courtney Lindsey	25	United States	20.09	7
3rd place, bronze medalist(s)	Kyree King	29	United States	20.15	6
4	Joseph Fahnbulleh	22	Liberia	20.16	5
5	Alexander Ogando	24	Dominican Republic	20.27	4
6	Aaron Brown	31	Canada	20.47	3
7	Jeremiah Curry	24	United States	20.69	2
8	Brandon Carnes	29	United States	20.83	1
9	Ian Kerr	28	Bahamas	20.87	

Men's Mile
Place	Athlete	Age	Country	Time	Points
1st place, gold medalist(s)	Josh Kerr	26	Great Britain	3:45.34	8
2nd place, silver medalist(s)	Jakob Ingebrigtsen	23	Norway	3:45.60	7
3rd place, bronze medalist(s)	Yared Nuguse	24	United States	3:46.22	6
4	Neil Gourley	29	Great Britain	3:47.74	5
5	Jake Wightman	29	Great Britain	3:47.83	4
6	Reynold Cheruiyot	19	Kenya	3:48.59	3
7	Cole Hocker	22	United States	3:48.95	2
8	Geordie Beamish	27	New Zealand	3:49.09	1
9	Olli Hoare	27	Australia	3:49.11	
10	Mario García	24	Spain	3:50.14	
11	Cameron Myers	17	Australia	3:50.15	
12	Abel Kipsang	27	Kenya	3:51.82	
13	Lamecha Girma	23	Ethiopia	3:53.82	
14	Cooper Teare	24	United States	3:53.92	
	Abraham Alvarado	28	United States	DNF	
	Hobbs Kessler	21	United States	DNF	

Men's 110 Metres Hurdles (−0.1 m/s)
Place	Athlete	Age	Country	Time	Points
1st place, gold medalist(s)	Grant Holloway	26	United States	13.03	8
2nd place, silver medalist(s)	Daniel Roberts	26	United States	13.13	7
3rd place, bronze medalist(s)	Freddie Crittenden	29	United States	13.16	6
4	Hansle Parchment	33	Jamaica	13.28	5
5	Trey Cunningham	25	United States	13.29	4
6	Asier Martínez	24	Spain	13.31	3
7	Shunsuke Izumiya	24	Japan	13.33	2
8	Jamal Britt	25	United States	13.36	1
9	Cordell Tinch	23	United States	13.38	

Men's 400 Metres Hurdles
Place	Athlete	Age	Country	Time	Points
1st place, gold medalist(s)	Gerald Drummond	29	Costa Rica	48.56	8
2nd place, silver medalist(s)	Rasmus Mägi	32	Estonia	48.85	7
3rd place, bronze medalist(s)	CJ Allen	29	United States	48.99	6
4	Roshawn Clarke	19	Jamaica	49.07	5
5	Malik James-King	24	Jamaica	49.51	4
6	Trevor Bassitt	26	United States	49.62	3
7	Jaheel Hyde	27	Jamaica	49.83	2

Men's Shot Put
Place	Athlete	Age	Country	Mark	Points
1st place, gold medalist(s)	Joe Kovacs	34	United States	23.13 m	8
2nd place, silver medalist(s)	Payton Otterdahl	28	United States	22.16 m	7
3rd place, bronze medalist(s)	Chukwuebuka Enekwechi	31	Nigeria	21.91 m	6
4	Josh Awotunde	28	United States	21.53 m	5
5	Tom Walsh	32	New Zealand	21.33 m	4
6	Roger Steen	32	United States	20.78 m	3
7	Rajindra Campbell	28	Jamaica	20.68 m	2
8	Adrian Piperi	25	United States	20.56 m	1

Women's 100 Metres (+1.5 m/s)
Place	Athlete	Age	Country	Time	Points
1st place, gold medalist(s)	Sha'Carri Richardson	24	United States	10.83	8
2nd place, silver medalist(s)	Julien Alfred	22	Saint Lucia	10.93	7
3rd place, bronze medalist(s)	Dina Asher-Smith	28	Great Britain	10.98	6
4	Daryll Neita	27	Great Britain	11.00	5
5	Melissa Jefferson	23	United States	11.02	4
6	Marie-Josée Ta Lou	35	Ivory Coast	11.05	3
7	Twanisha Terry	25	United States	11.19	2
8	Brittany Brown	29	United States	11.21	1
9	Elaine Thompson-Herah	31	Jamaica	11.30	

Women's 800 Metres
Place	Athlete	Age	Country	Time	Points
1st place, gold medalist(s)	Keely Hodgkinson	22	Great Britain	1:55.78	8
2nd place, silver medalist(s)	Mary Moraa	23	Kenya	1:56.71	7
3rd place, bronze medalist(s)	Jemma Reekie	26	Great Britain	1:57.45	6
4	Nia Akins	25	United States	1:57.98	5
5	Halimah Nakaayi	29	Uganda	1:58.18	4
6	Catriona Bisset	30	Australia	1:58.44	3
7	Sage Hurta	25	United States	1:58.48	2
8	Tsige Duguma	23	Ethiopia	1:58.70	1
9	Natoya Goule	33	Jamaica	1:59.92	
10	Worknesh Mesele	22	Ethiopia	2:01.53	
	Kaylin Whitney	26	United States	DNF	

Women's 1500 Metres
Place	Athlete	Age	Country	Time	Points
1st place, gold medalist(s)	Diribe Welteji	22	Ethiopia	3:53.75	8
2nd place, silver medalist(s)	Jessica Hull	27	Australia	3:55.97	7
3rd place, bronze medalist(s)	Elle Purrier St. Pierre	29	United States	3:56.00	6
4	Laura Muir	31	Great Britain	3:56.35	5
5	Nikki Hiltz	29	United States	3:59.64	4
6	Emily Mackay	26	United States	3:59.76	3
7	Katie Snowden	30	Great Britain	4:00.24	2
8	Georgia Bell	30	Great Britain	4:00.41	1
9	Sinclaire Johnson	26	United States	4:00.43	
10	Habitam Alemu	26	Ethiopia	4:00.44	
11	Susan Ejore	28	Kenya	4:01.09	
12	Linden Hall	32	Australia	4:01.97	
13	Elise Cranny	28	United States	4:03.08	
14	Cory McGee	31	United States	4:04.91	
	Jazz Shukla	25	Canada	DNF	

Women's 5000 Metres
Place	Athlete	Age	Country	Time	Points
1st place, gold medalist(s)	Tsigie Gebreselama	23	Ethiopia	14:18.76	8
2nd place, silver medalist(s)	Ejgayehu Taye	24	Ethiopia	14:18.92	7
3rd place, bronze medalist(s)	Freweyni Hailu	23	Ethiopia	14:20.61	6
4	Aynadis Mebratu	19	Ethiopia	14:22.76	5
5	Birke Haylom	18	Ethiopia	14:23.71	4
6	Hirut Meshesha	23	Ethiopia	14:33.44	3
7	Sifan Hassan	31	Netherlands	14:34.38	2
8	Fantaye Belayneh	23	Ethiopia	14:35.27	1
9	Weini Kelati	27	United States	14:35.43	
10	Senayet Getachew	18	Ethiopia	14:37.38	
11	Nozomi Tanaka	24	Japan	14:47.69	
12	Bosena Mulatie	22	Ethiopia	14:53.15	
13	Ayal Dagnachew	22	Ethiopia	14:53.85	
14	Karoline Bjerkeli Grøvdal	33	Norway	14:56.24	
15	Lauren Ryan	26	Australia	15:03.63	
16	Emily Infeld	34	United States	15:12.48	
17	Joselyn Brea	29	Venezuela	15:13.02	
18	Yenawa Nbret	17	Ethiopia	15:16.26	
19	Teresia Muthoni Gateri	22	Kenya	15:30.87	
	Lemlem Hailu	23	Ethiopia	DNF	
	Simone Plourde	23	Canada	DNF	

Women's 3000 Metres Steeplechase
Place	Athlete	Age	Country	Time	Points
1st place, gold medalist(s)	Peruth Chemutai	24	Uganda	8:55.09	8
2nd place, silver medalist(s)	Beatrice Chepkoech	32	Kenya	8:56.51	7
3rd place, bronze medalist(s)	Faith Cherotich	19	Kenya	9:04.45	6
4	Sembo Almayew	19	Ethiopia	9:07.26	5
5	Valerie Constien	28	United States	9:14.29	4
6	Courtney Wayment	25	United States	9:14.48	3
7	Gabrielle Jennings	25	United States	9:18.03	2
8	Kaylee Mitchell	24	United States	9:21.00	1
9	Winfred Yavi	24	Bahrain	9:21.62	
10	Norah Jeruto	28	Kazakhstan	9:22.91	
11	Krissy Gear	24	United States	9:24.42	
12	Marwa Bouzayani	27	Tunisia	9:24.84	
13	Jackline Chepkoech	20	Kenya	9:30.59	
14	Regan Yee	28	Canada	9:30.78	
15	Belén Casetta	29	Argentina	9:37.20	
16	Parul Chaudhary	29	India	9:46.74	
	Logan Jolly	25	United States	DNF	

Women's Pole Vault
Place	Athlete	Age	Country	Mark	Points
1st place, gold medalist(s)	Emily Grove	31	United States	4.63 m	8
2nd place, silver medalist(s)	Katie Moon	32	United States	4.53 m	7
3rd place, bronze medalist(s)	Robeilys Peinado	26	Venezuela	4.53 m	6
4	Gabriela Leon	24	United States	4.43 m	5
5	Bridget Williams	28	United States	4.43 m	4
6	Anicka Newell	30	Canada	4.28 m	3
7	Rachel Baxter	25	United States	4.28 m	2

Women's Triple Jump
Place	Athlete	Age	Country	Mark	Points
1st place, gold medalist(s)	Leyanis Pérez	22	Cuba	14.73 m (+2.1 m/s)	8
2nd place, silver medalist(s)	Thea LaFond	30	Dominica	14.62 m (−0.6 m/s)	7
3rd place, bronze medalist(s)	Shanieka Ricketts	32	Jamaica	14.55 m (−0.4 m/s)	6
4	Keturah Orji	28	United States	14.13 m (+0.2 m/s)	5
5	Tori Franklin	31	United States	13.97 m (−0.2 m/s)	4
6	Jasmine Moore	23	United States	13.93 m (+0.1 m/s)	3
7	Kimberly Williams	35	Jamaica	13.74 m (−0.1 m/s)	2
8	Ryann Porter	22	United States	12.79 m (−0.3 m/s)	1
Best wind-legal performances
	Leyanis Pérez	22	Cuba	14.56 m (−0.3 m/s)	

Women's Discus Throw
Place	Athlete	Age	Country	Mark	Points
1st place, gold medalist(s)	Valarie Allman	29	United States	67.36 m	8
2nd place, silver medalist(s)	Yaime Pérez	32	Cuba	67.25 m	7
3rd place, bronze medalist(s)	Jorinde van Klinken	24	Netherlands	64.88 m	6
4	Sandra Perković Elkasević	33	Croatia	64.69 m	5
5	Kristin Pudenz	31	Germany	62.24 m	4
6	Laulauga Tausaga	26	United States	62.01 m	3
7	Chioma Onyekwere	29	Nigeria	59.90 m	2

=== Promotional events ===
Women's 100 Metres Hurdles (−0.9 m/s)
Place	Athlete	Age	Country	Time
1st place, gold medalist(s)	Cyréna Samba-Mayela	23	France	12.52
2nd place, silver medalist(s)	Jasmine Camacho-Quinn	27	Puerto Rico	12.54
3rd place, bronze medalist(s)	Tonea Marshall	25	United States	12.55
4	Devynne Charlton	28	Bahamas	12.63
5	Alaysha Johnson	27	United States	12.65
6	Danielle Williams	31	Jamaica	12.65
7	Cindy Sember	29	Great Britain	12.76
8	Nia Ali	35	United States	12.80
9	Masai Russell	23	United States	12.80

Women's Hammer Throw
Place	Athlete	Age	Country	Mark
1st place, gold medalist(s)	Camryn Rogers	24	Canada	77.76 m
2nd place, silver medalist(s)	DeAnna Price	30	United States	76.74 m
3rd place, bronze medalist(s)	Brooke Andersen	28	United States	76.34 m
4	Janee' Kassanavoid	29	United States	74.65 m
5	Silja Kosonen	21	Finland	73.97 m
6	Annette Echikunwoke	27	United States	72.25 m
7	Janeah Stewart	27	United States	67.16 m
8	Jillian Weir	31	Canada	66.94 m

=== National events ===
Men's 10,000 Metres
Place	Athlete	Age	Country	Time
1st place, gold medalist(s)	Daniel Mateiko	25	Kenya	26:50.81
2nd place, silver medalist(s)	Nicholas Kimeli	25	Kenya	26:50.94
3rd place, bronze medalist(s)	Benard Kibet	24	Kenya	26:51.09
4	Edwin Kurgat	28	Kenya	26:51.54
5	Benson Kiplangat	20	Kenya	26:55.09
6	Kibiwott Kandie	27	Kenya	26:58.97
7	Stanley Mburu	24	Kenya	27:07.37
8	Daniel Ebenyo	28	Kenya	27:24.33
9	Francis Abong	28	Kenya	27:37.68
10	Ronald Kwemoi	28	Kenya	27:47.72
11	Peter Mwaniki Aila	29	Kenya	27:49.43
12	Weldon Langat	26	Kenya	28:02.55
13	Gideon Kipkertich Rono	21	Kenya	28:25.19
	Andrew Ernst		United States	DNF
	Kasey Knevelbaard	27	United States	DNF
	Samwel Chebolei Masai	23	Kenya	DNF

Women's 10,000 Metres
Place	Athlete	Age	Country	Time
1st place, gold medalist(s)	Beatrice Chebet	24	Kenya	28:54.14 WR
2nd place, silver medalist(s)	Gudaf Tsegay	27	Ethiopia	29:05.92
3rd place, bronze medalist(s)	Lilian Kasait Rengeruk	27	Kenya	29:26.89
4	Margaret Kipkemboi	31	Kenya	29:27.59
5	Janeth Chepngetich	25	Kenya	30:04.97
6	Catherine Amanang'ole	21	Kenya	30:07.42
7	Faith Chepkoech	21	Kenya	30:22.77
8	Sarah Chelangat	22	Uganda	30:24.04
9	Miriam Chebet	21	Kenya	30:27.30
10	Grace Nawowuna	20	Kenya	30:34.86
11	Loice Chemnung	27	Kenya	30:44.86
12	Daisy Jepkemei	28	Kazakhstan	30:52.43
	Emmaculate Anyango	24	Kenya	~~30:06.43~~ DSQ
	Selah Jepleting Busienei	32	Kenya	DNF
	Jesca Chelangat	26	Kenya	DNF
	Diana Chepkorir	22	Kenya	DNF
	Rachel McArthur	24	United States	DNF
	Mekedes Alemeshete	18	Ethiopia	DNF
	Saron Berhe	16	Ethiopia	DNF
