= 2022 World Athletics Championships – Women's hammer throw =

Women's hammer throw at the 2022 World Championships
- Venue: Hayward Field
- Dates: 15 July (qualification); 17 July (final)
- Competitors: 32 from 21 nations
- Winning distance: 78.96

Medalists
gold medal	Brooke Andersen	United States
silver medal	Camryn Rogers	Canada
bronze medal	Janee' Kassanavoid	United States

Video on YouTube Official Video

The women's hammer throw at the 2022 World Athletics Championships was held at the Hayward Field in Eugene on 15 and 17 July 2022.

== Records ==
Before the competition records were as follows:

Record	Athlete & Nat.	Perf.	Location	Date
World record	Anita Włodarczyk (POL)	82.98 m	Warsaw, Poland	28 August 2016
Championship record	Anita Włodarczyk (POL)	80.85 m	Beijing, China	27 August 2015
World Leading	Brooke Andersen (USA)	79.02 m	Tucson, United States	30 April 2022
African Record	Annette Echikunwoke (NGR)	75.49 m	Tucson, United States	22 May 2021
Asian Record	Wang Zheng (CHN)	77.68 m	Chengdu, China	29 March 2014
North, Central American and Caribbean record	DeAnna Price (USA)	80.31 m	Eugene, United States	26 June 2021
South American Record	Jennifer Dahlgren (ARG)	73.74 m	Buenos Aires, Argentina	10 April 2010
European Record	Anita Włodarczyk (POL)	82.98 m	Warsaw, Poland	28 August 2016
Oceanian record	Lauren Bruce (NZL)	74.61 m	Tucson, United States	22 May 2021

== Qualification standard ==
The standard to qualify automatically for entry was 72.50 m.

== Schedule ==
The event schedule, in local time (UTC−7), was as follows:

Date	Time	Round
15 July	12:05	Qualification
17 July	11:35	Final

== Results ==
=== Qualification ===
Qualification: Qualifying Performance 73.50 (Q) or at least 12 best performers (q) advanced to the final.

Rank	Group	Name	Nationality	Round			Mark	Notes
Rank	Group	Name	Nationality	1	2	3	Mark	Notes
1	A	Janee' Kassanavoid	United States	74.46			74.46	Q
2	B	Brooke Andersen	United States	74.37			74.37	Q
3	A	Krista Tervo	Finland	68.35	73.83		73.83	Q
4	A	Camryn Rogers	Canada	73.67			73.67	Q
5	B	Annette Echikunwoke	United States	69.38	72.60	66.65	72.60	q
6	B	Sara Fantini	Italy	69.20	71.76	72.38	72.38	q
7	B	Silja Kosonen	Finland	70.68	72.15	71.92	72.15	q
8	B	Bianca Ghelber	Romania	69.36	70.39	72.00	72.00	q
9	B	Jillian Weir	Canada	69.04	72.00	x	72.00	q
10	A	Luo Na	China	68.80	71.36	71.01	71.36	q
11	A	Hanna Skydan	Azerbaijan	70.93	70.71	x	70.93	q
12	A	Grete Ahlberg	Sweden	69.28	68.20	70.87	70.87	q, PB
13	A	Lauren Bruce	New Zealand	x	68.92	70.86	70.86	
14	A	Li Jiangyan	China	69.61	70.50	x	70.50	
15	B	Malwina Kopron	Poland	68.46	x	70.50	70.50	
16	B	Julia Ratcliffe	New Zealand	64.53	x	69.96	69.96	
17	A	Zalina Marghieva	Moldova	x	68.78	69.73	69.73	
18	A	Alexandra Hulley	Australia	64.46	68.83	68.49	68.83	
19	A	Laura Redondo	Spain	67.82	68.67	68.04	68.67	
20	B	Katrine Koch Jacobsen	Denmark	66.23	66.16	68.51	68.51	
21	B	Zhao Jie	China	65.89	x	68.18	68.18	
22	B	Iryna Klymets	Ukraine	68.12	x	67.72	68.12	
23	B	Suvi Koskinen	Finland	66.30	67.98	65.96	67.98	
24	B	Vanessa Sterckendries	Belgium	66.24	x	67.88	67.88	
25	A	Samantha Borutta	Germany	67.48	67.30	66.91	67.48	
26	B	Stamatia Scarvelis	Greece	67.20	66.56	64.39	67.20	
27	A	Oyesade Olatoye	Nigeria	62.53	65.71	64.82	65.71	
28	A	Beatrice Nedberge Llano	Norway	64.57	64.81	x	64.81	
29	B	Mariana Grasielly Marcelino	Brazil	62.53	64.72	61.53	64.72	
30	A	Nicole Bradley	New Zealand	x	62.88	x	62.88	

=== Final ===
Rank	Name	Nationality	Round						Mark	Notes
Rank	Name	Nationality	1	2	3	4	5	6	Mark	Notes
1st place, gold medalist(s)	Brooke Andersen	United States	74.81	x	72.74	77.42	77.56	78.96	78.96	
2nd place, silver medalist(s)	Camryn Rogers	Canada	72.61	x	75.52	75.18	75.05	74.36	75.52	
3rd place, bronze medalist(s)	Janee' Kassanavoid	United States	x	74.86	x	74.75	74.24	74.75	74.86	
4	Sara Fantini	Italy	71.45	73.18	70.80	x	71.05	71.04	73.18	
5	Jillian Weir	Canada	67.24	68.66	70.46	x	70.64	72.41	72.41	
6	Bianca Ghelber	Romania	70.09	72.26	70.83	70.25	x	x	72.26	
7	Silja Kosonen	Finland	69.46	70.32	70.49	70.81	x	70.75	70.81	
8	Luo Na	China	69.89	69.57	70.42	x	70.13	x	70.42	
9	Grete Ahlberg	Sweden	69.39	68.61	70.11				70.11	
10	Krista Tervo	Finland	x	69.04	x				69.04	
11	Hanna Skydan	Azerbaijan	65.62	64.76	69.01				69.01	
12	Annette Echikunwoke	United States	68.12	66.66	x				68.12	
