= 2025 Asian Athletics Championships – Women's hammer throw =

Women's hammer throw at the 2025 Asian Athletics Championships
- Venue: Gumi Civic Stadium
- Location: Gumi, South Korea
- Dates: 27 May
- Competitors: 12 from 7 nations
- Winning distance: 72.98 m

Medalists
gold medal	Ji Li	China
silver medal	Li Jiangyan	China
bronze medal	Yu Ya-chien	Chinese Taipei

The women's hammer throw event at the 2025 Asian Athletics Championships was held on 27 May.

== Records ==
Records before the 2025 Asian Athletics Championships
Record	Athlete (nation)	Distance (m)	Location	Date
World record	Anita Włodarczyk (POL)	82.98	Warsaw, Poland	28 August 2016
Asian record	Xiao Yanling (CHN)	77.68	Chengdu, China	29 March 2014
Championship record	Wang Zheng (CHN)	75.66	Doha, Qatar	22 April 2019
World leading	Brooke Andersen (USA)	79.29	Tucson, United States	23 May 2025
Asian leading	Zhao Jie (CHN)	75.48	Chengdu, China	2 April 2025

== Schedule ==
The event schedule, in local time (UTC+9), was as follows:

Date	Time	Round
27 May	12:00	Final

== Results ==
Place	Athlete	Nation	#1	#2	#3	#4	#5	#6	Result	Notes
1st place, gold medalist(s)	Ji Li	China	67.52	69.95	71.92	70.24	72.98	x	72.98 m	
2nd place, silver medalist(s)	Li Jiangyan	China	x	69.09	67.13	68.61	69.00	69.13	69.13 m	
3rd place, bronze medalist(s)	Yu Ya-chien	Chinese Taipei	62.89	63.64	60.05	64.25	62.97	63.30	64.25 m	
4	Joy McArthur	Japan	61.12	x	63.61	61.40	x	63.58	63.61 m	
5	Raika Murakami	Japan	62.29	62.61	63.60	x	x	61.61	63.60 m	
6	Mingkamon Koomphon	Thailand	57.19	57.91	61.28	59.75	59.93	61.42	61.42 m	
7	Kim Tae-hui	South Korea	58.25	61.13	59.03	x	60.65	60.67	61.13 m	
8	Park Syeo-jin	South Korea	60.66	58.38	x	x	59.52	59.43	60.66 m	SB
9	Melika Norouzi	Iran	59.02	x	59.18				59.18 m	
10	Grace Wong Xiu Mei	Malaysia	x	58.10	59.15				59.15 m	SB
11	Lee Yu-ra	South Korea	57.06	x	57.94				57.94 m	
12	Nurul Hidayah Lukman	Malaysia	x	46.60	45.98				46.60 m	
