= Camryn Rogers =

Canadian hammer thrower (born 1999)

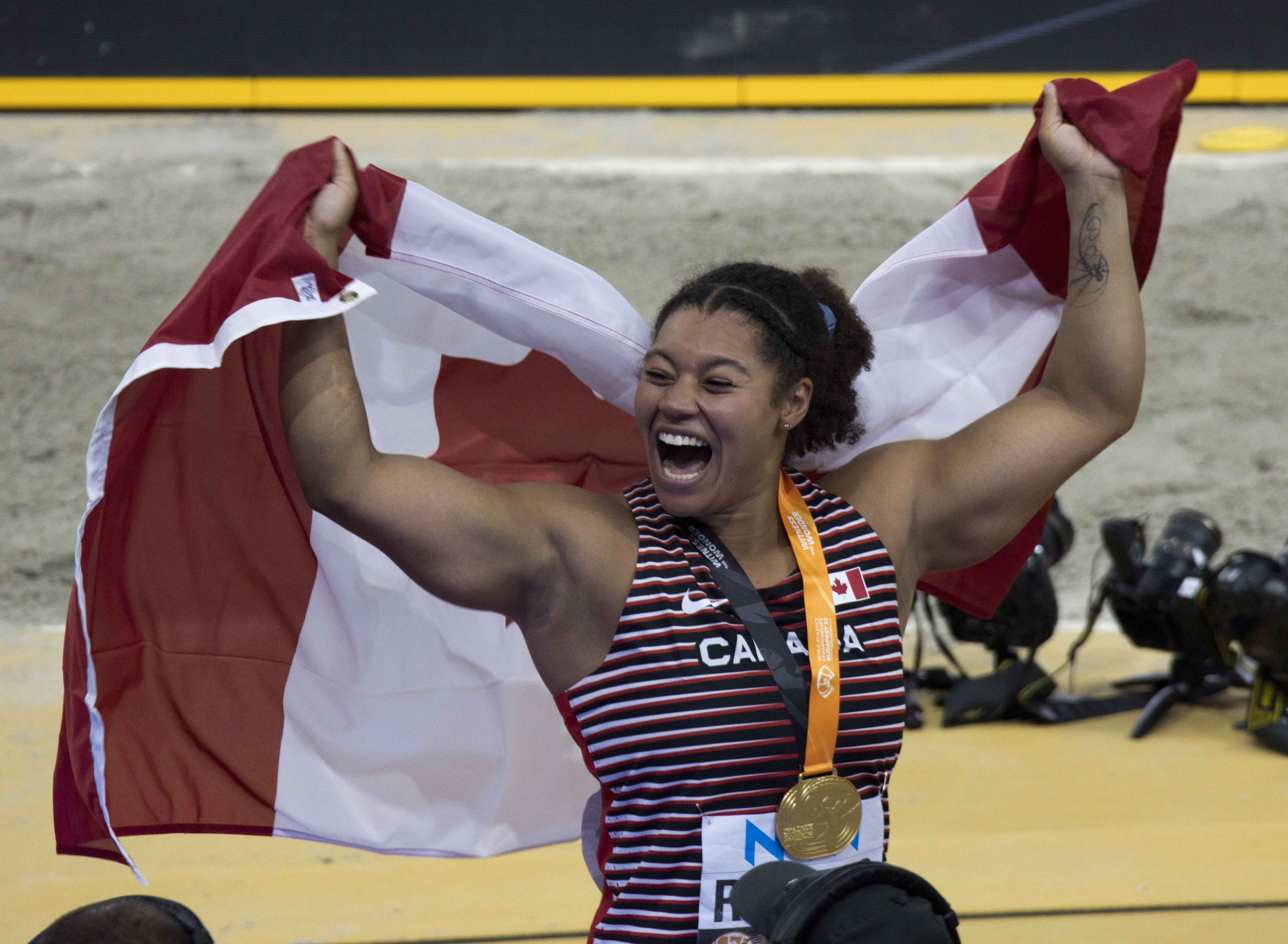
- Rogers in 2023

Personal information
- Born: June 7, 1999 (age 27) Richmond, British Columbia, Canada
- Height: 170 cm (5 ft 7 in)

Sport
- Country: Canada
- Sport: Track and field
- Event: Hammer throw
- College team: California Golden Bears (2018–2022)
- Coached by: Mo Saatara

Achievements and titles
- Highest world ranking: 1st (2023)
- Personal bests: 81.13 m (266 ft 2 in) NR, AR Austin, 2026
Medal record
Women's athletics
Representing Canada
Olympic Games
Gold medal – first place	2024 Paris	Hammer throw
World Championships
Gold medal – first place	2023 Budapest	Hammer throw
Gold medal – first place	2025 Tokyo	Hammer throw
Silver medal – second place	2022 Eugene	Hammer throw
Commonwealth Games
Gold medal – first place	2022 Birmingham	Hammer throw
Gold medal – first place	2026 Glasgow	Hammer throw
World U20 Championships
Gold medal – first place	2018 Tampere	Hammer throw
Pan American U20 Championships
Gold medal – first place	2017 Trujillo	Hammer throw

Camryn Rogers (born June 7, 1999) is a Canadian athlete specializing in the hammer throw. She is the 2024 Olympic champion and a two-time world champion (2023, 2025) in that discipline, in both instances the first Canadian woman to win that title. Rogers was only the second Canadian woman to win gold at the World Athletics Championships in any discipline, and was the first to win more than one. Her Olympic gold medal was the first for a Canadian woman in track and field in 96 years.

Rogers is also the 2022 World silver medallist, a two-time Commonwealth Games champion (2022, 2026), 2018 world U20 champion, and represented Canada at the 2020 Summer Olympics. She competed at the collegiate level as a member of the California Golden Bears track and field team, winning three NCAA outdoor titles.

== Early life ==
Rogers was born and raised in the Steveston neighbourhood of Richmond, British Columbia. Following her parents' divorce when she was three years old, she was raised by her mother, Shari Rogers, a hairdresser. Her mother would later say, "for many years, it was just her and I. Many struggles along the way. A lot of hardships." Rogers did not initially participate in any sports, but first tried the hammer throw on January 5, 2012, upon the recommendation of one of her mother's clients, who was a member of the Richmond Kajaks track club. She would later say, "fifteen minutes before the start of the first practice of the new year. I just decided I should go. There was no way of knowing until you did it." Rogers cited the 2012 Summer Olympics in London some months afterward as solidifying her interest in becoming an elite athlete.

In 2017, Rogers was a high school champion in hammer throw and was recruited by several American universities. She opted to attend the University of California, Berkeley, where she completed two academic degrees.

== Competitive career ==
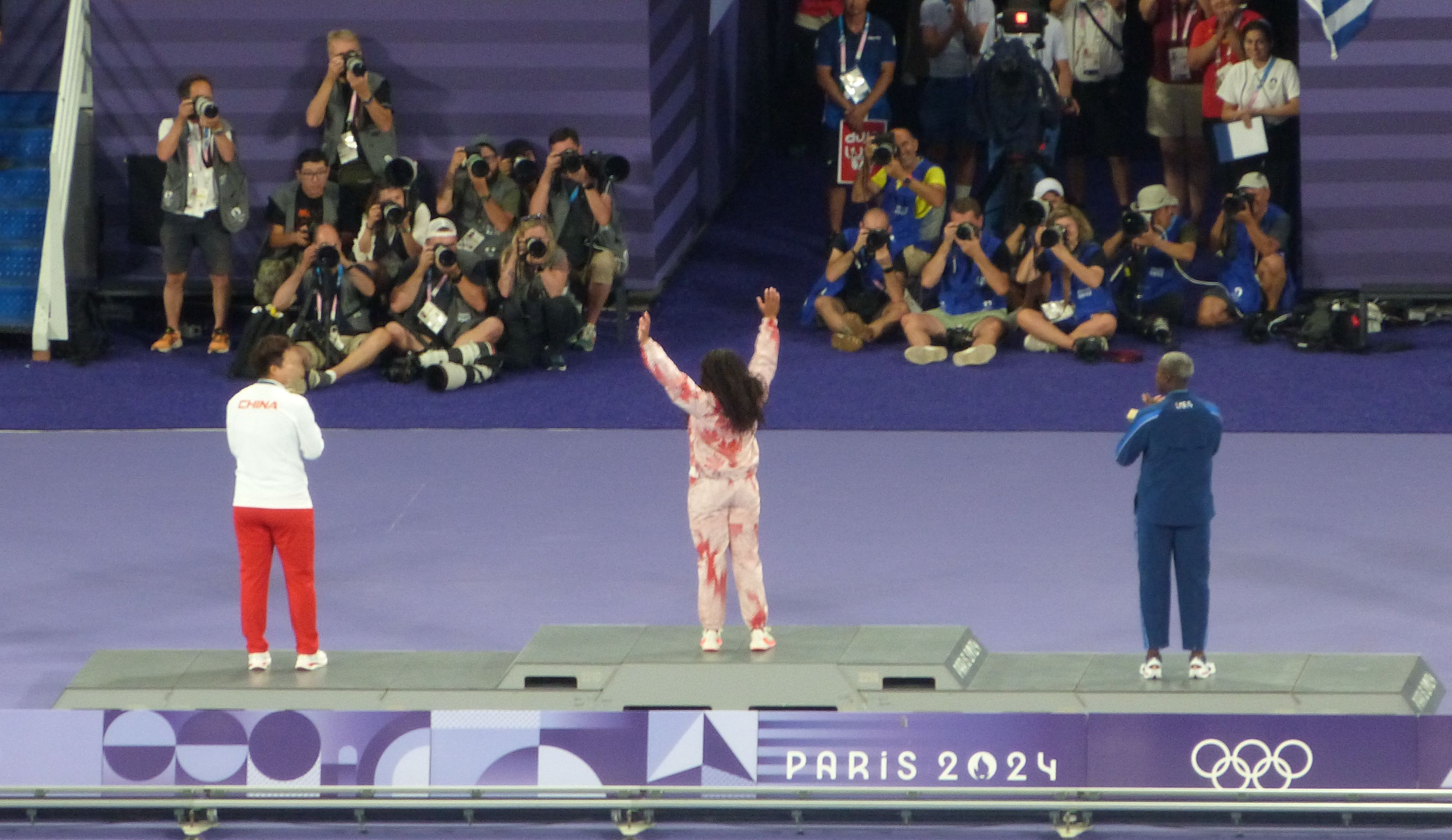
2024 Summer Olympics - Women's hammer throw Finale - Podium

=== 2017–2022: NCAA career and Tokyo Olympics ===
Following her high school graduation from McMath secondary school, she attended the University of California, Berkeley, then won the women's hammer throw event at the 2017 Canadian U20 Championships and then won the same event at the 2017 Pan American U20 Athletics Championships. She was initially named to the British Columbian team for the Canada Summer Games but withdrew in order to focus on preparations for her time at Berkeley. The following year, she won the women's hammer throw at the 2018 IAAF World U20 Championships, saying it was "really special. I think the thought of me being the world champion will really hit me later."

In 2019, Rogers won gold at the 2019 NCAA Division I Outdoor Track and Field Championships. This was a California student's first championship title in women's track and field since 2008. Athletics Canada awarded her the Eric E. Coy Trophy as national U20 athlete of the year. Rogers went on to make her debut at senior international championships, placing sixth in the hammer event at the 2019 Pan American Games in Lima.

The onset of the COVID-19 pandemic resulted in the cancellation of much of the 2020 athletics season and the delay by a full year of the 2020 Summer Olympics, where Rogers had hoped to compete. With the resumption of major competition in 2021, Rogers won her second women's hammer throw title at the 2021 NCAA Division I Outdoor Track and Field Championships. In the process, she broke the collegiate record twice in one day and set a personal best with a throw of 75.52 m (247 ft 9 in). Afterwards she was named to the Canadian team for the 2020 Summer Olympics in Tokyo. She advanced to the final of the hammer throw event, the first Canadian woman to ever do so, and finished fifth.

Rogers won the bronze medal in the weight throw at NCAA Indoor Track & Field Championships, setting a new national record in the event 24.06 m (78 ft 11 in). She then won her third title at the 2022 NCAA Division I Outdoor Track and Field Championships, setting another championship record with the ninth-best distance (77.67 m) in the history of women's hammer throw. Rogers then made her World Athletics Championships debut at the 2022 edition in Eugene, Oregon. Qualifying to the final of the hammer throw event, she won the silver medal with a best throw of 75.52 m. This was the first World medal for a Canadian woman in a field sport. In her second major international championship of the season, Rogers was part of the Canadian team for the 2022 Commonwealth Games in Birmingham. On her first and only throw in the qualification round of the hammer throw, she managed a distance of 74.68 m, breaking the Commonwealth Games record previously held by fellow Canadian Sultana Frizell. Rogers went on to win the title with a 74.08 m third throw in the final, finishing four and a half metres clear of silver medallist Julia Ratcliffe of New Zealand. Fellow Canadian thrower Jillian Weir joined her on the podium as bronze medallist. In recognition of her achievements, Athletics Canada named her their 2022 Athlete of the Year.

=== 2023–present: World and Olympic gold ===
Rogers graduated from Berkeley with her master's degree in cultural studies in sport and education in 2023, and started work as special education advocate in September 2023. Following her graduation, Rogers began her first full professional season. She was unsponsored going into the new season, necessitating new planning for her finances. Competing at the 2023 USATF Los Angeles Grand Prix in May, Rogers raised her Canadian national record to 78.62. This ranked her fifth in the world all-time list. On the 2023 World Athletics Continental Tour, Rogers finished second at both the Irena Szewińska Memorial in Poland and the Paavo Nurmi Games in Finland, in both cases coming behind reigning World champion Brooke Andersen.

Rogers entered the 2023 World Athletics Championships as a contender for the title, albeit with Andersen having recorded the five longest throws of the year to that point. After qualifying to the final, she won the gold medal based on her first throw of 77.22 metres. In so doing, she became the second Canadian woman to win gold at the World Athletics Championships, after Perdita Felicien's 2003 hurdles title. As well, she was part of a Canadian sweep of the hammer titles in Budapest, along with Ethan Katzberg's unexpected gold medal in the men's event. With her world championship gold in hand, she shortly afterwards acquired sponsorship from Nike, saying "I signed my name on the dotted line the day after the final."

Early in the 2024 athletics season, Rogers appeared at the Prefontaine Classic on the Diamond League, a circuit on which the hammer throw is not a regular feature. She won the event with a throw of 77.76 m, a new Diamond League record for the hammer throw. In the lead-up to the Parisian 2024 Summer Olympics, she was widely considered the favourite for the gold medal, which Rogers called "a testament to the work and the time and the sacrifices that my coach, my whole support system and I have made to really make this dream come true." Competing in the Olympic hammer throw, she was second in the qualification phase with a 74.69 m distance. In the final, Rogers initially led after the first round of throws, and retook the lead permanently with a 76.97 m throw in the penultimate fifth round, winning the gold medal. She finished almost 1.5 metres clear of American silver medalist Annette Echikunwoke. This was the first gold medal for a Canadian woman in track and field in 96 years, the two previous wins having come at the 1928 Summer Olympics, which saw women's athletics debut at the Olympics, as well as the first Canadian medal in women's hammer throw. With Katzberg having already claimed victory in the men's event, Canada swept the hammer throw at a second major championship.

Rogers won nine of her first ten events to start the 2025 season, with her only other result being a second-place finish. At the 2025 Prefontaine Classic on July 5, she improved the Canadian national record to 78.88 m. She entered the 2025 World Athletics Championships in Tokyo as the favourite to defend her title, four years after her Olympic debut in the same venue, which prompted her to note: "I was the youngest finalist up there competing, and there was so much that I still didn't know. I just feel like I've grown up a lot." At the hammer throw event in Tokyo, she won the gold medal with an 80.51 m throw. This was the seventh-longest throw of all time, and the longest by anyone other than Poland's Anita Włodarczyk, who told Rogers "welcome to the 80-metre club" after the close of competition. Rogers became the first individual Canadian to successfully defend a World Athletics title. The following day, Katzberg became the second to do so, giving Canada its third consecutive major double in the hammer events.

At the start of the 2026 athletics season, Rogers, took gold at the Clyde Littlefield Texas Relays event in Austin. Her winning distance was 81.13 metres, the fourth-longest throw in history, further improving her national and area records. She continued to have success on the World Athletics Continental Tour, and by the time of a July 10 victory in Dublin had won eight of her ten events of the season, albeit with a downtick in her distances achieved after three early victories clearing the 80-metre mark. Rogers joined the Canadian delegation to the 2026 Commonwealth Games in Glasgow, successfully defending her title with a winning throw of 74.91 m, despite heavy rain during the competition. She remarked that to "come out here knowing that I have the training to compete in these conditions, that you train for such a big chunk of your life to prepare for moments like this, and to get the job done when it matters the most, I think everything falls into place."

== Championship results ==
Representing Canada
Year	Competition	Venue	Position	Event	Result
2016	World U20 Championships	Bydgoszcz, Poland	24th (q)	Hammer throw	53.58 m
2017	Pan American U20 Championships	Trujillo, Peru	1st	Hammer throw	63.42 m
2018	World U20 Championships	Tampere, Finland	1st	Hammer throw	64.90 m
2019	Pan American Games	Lima, Peru	6th	Hammer throw	66.09 m
2021	Olympic Games	Tokyo, Japan	5th	Hammer throw	74.35 m
2022	World Championships	Eugene, United States	2nd	Hammer throw	75.52 m
2022	Commonwealth Games	Birmingham, United Kingdom	1st	Hammer throw	74.08 m
2023	World Championships	Budapest, Hungary	1st	Hammer throw	77.22 m
2024	Olympic Games	Paris, France	1st	Hammer throw	76.97 m
2025	World Championships	Tokyo, Japan	1st	Hammer throw	80.51 m
2026	Commonwealth Games	Glasgow, United Kingdom	1st	Hammer throw	74.91 m
