= Athletics at the 2022 Asian Games – Women's hammer throw =

Women's hammer throw at the 2022 Asian Games
- Venue: Hangzhou Olympic Expo Main Stadium
- Date: 29 September 2023
- Competitors: 11 from 8 nations

Medalists
gold medal	Wang Zheng	China
silver medal	Zhao Jie	China
bronze medal	Kim Tae-hui	South Korea

The women's hammer throw competition at the 2022 Asian Games took place on 29 September 2023 at the HOC Stadium, Hangzhou.

== Schedule ==
All times are China Standard Time (UTC+08:00)

Date	Time	Event
Friday, 29 September 2023	19:10	Final

== Records ==
Prior to this competition, the existing world, Asian and Games records were as follows.

World Record	Anita Włodarczyk (POL)	82.98	Warsaw, Poland	28 August 2016
Asian Record	Wang Zheng (CHN)	77.68	Chengdu, China	29 March 2014
Games Record	Zhang Wenxiu (CHN)	77.33	Incheon, South Korea	28 September 2014

== Results ==
Rank	Athlete	Attempt						Result	Notes
Rank	Athlete	1	2	3	4	5	6	Result	Notes
1st place, gold medalist(s)	Wang Zheng (CHN)	65.83	X	X	69.83	70.86	71.53	71.53	
2nd place, silver medalist(s)	Zhao Jie (CHN)	68.50	69.44	X	68.78	69.26	X	69.44	
3rd place, bronze medalist(s)	Kim Tae-hui (KOR)	59.93	54.28	56.73	59.05	64.14	X	64.14	
4	Yu Ya-chien (TPE)	59.93	X	X	58.91	63.21	62.54	63.21	
5	Zarinakhon Nosirjonova (UZB)	59.76	60.74	58.57	59.31	60.82	61.72	61.72	
6	Joy McArthur (JPN)	X	59.87	X	61.01	X	X	61.01	
7	Tanya Chaudhary (IND)	57.17	58.75	60.50	59.05	59.52	58.26	60.50	
8	Mingkamon Koomphon (THA)	58.80	60.30	53.50	59.53	55.55	59.05	60.30	
9	Rachna Kumari (IND)	57.65	58.13	55.04				58.13	
10	Grace Wong (MAS)	56.04	55.36	57.46				57.46	
11	Park Seo-jin (KOR)	54.75	55.54	X				55.54	
