= Athletics at the 2025 Summer World University Games – Women's hammer throw =

Women's hammer throw at the 2025 Summer World University Games
- Venue: Lohrheidestadion
- Location: Bochum, Germany
- Dates: 26 July (qualification); 27 July (final)
- Competitors: 25 from 20 nations
- Winning distance: 72.80 m

Medalists
| gold medal | Zhao Jie | China |
| silver medal | Nicola Tuthill | Ireland |
| bronze medal | Sara Killinen | Finland |

The women's hammer throw event at the 2025 Summer World University Games was held in Bochum, Germany, at Lohrheidestadion on 26 and 27 July.

== Records ==
Prior to the competition, the records were as follows:

| Record | Athlete (nation) | Distance (m) | Location | Date |
|---|---|---|---|---|
| Games record | Malwina Kopron (POL) | 76.85 m | Taipei, Taiwan | 26 August 2017 |

== Results ==
=== Qualification ===
All athletes over 68.00 m (Q) or at least the 12 best performers (q) advance to the final.

==== Group A ====
| Place | Athlete | Nation | #1 | #2 | #3 | Result | Notes |
|---|---|---|---|---|---|---|---|
| 1 | Zhao Jie | China | 70.01 | | | 70.01 m | Q |
| 2 | Sara Forssell | Sweden | 67.03 | 66.60 | x | 67.03 m | q, PB |
| 3 | Sara Killinen | Finland | 66.50 | x | x | 66.50 m | q |
| 4 | Mariana Pestana | Portugal | 64.45 | 65.44 | 65.78 | 65.78 m | q |
| 5 | Samantha Borutta | Germany | x | x | 65.06 | 65.06 m | q |
| 6 | Emilia Kolokotroni | Cyprus | x | x | 63.69 | 63.69 m | q |
| 7 | Kali Terza | United States | x | 62.42 | 63.07 | 63.07 m | |
| 8 | Rawan Barakat | Egypt | 62.82 | 62.30 | 61.73 | 62.82 m | |
| 9 | Kim Tae-hui | South Korea | 61.93 | 61.35 | x | 61.93 m | |
| 10 | Lara Roberts | Australia | x | 60.60 | 56.93 | 60.60 m | |
| 11 | Harshita Sehrawat | India | 56.75 | 57.46 | 57.35 | 57.46 m | |
| 12 | Chelsea MacIsaac | Canada | 56.29 | 54.46 | x | 56.29 m | |
| 13 | Maleeha Saleem | Pakistan | 36.48 | x | x | 36.48 m | |

==== Group B ====
| Place | Athlete | Nation | #1 | #2 | #3 | Result | Notes |
|---|---|---|---|---|---|---|---|
| 1 | Nicola Tuthill | Ireland | 67.66 | 69.57 | | 69.57 m | Q |
| 2 | Aileen Kuhn | Germany | 69.20 | | | 69.20 m | Q |
| 3 | Emma Robbins | United States | 65.00 | 64.06 | 67.30 | 67.30 m | q |
| 4 | Raika Murakami | Japan | 65.89 | x | x | 65.89 m | q |
| 5 | Villő Viszkeleti | Hungary | 64.15 | 63.57 | 62.01 | 64.15 m | q |
| 6 | Nereida Santa Cruz | Ecuador | 63.97 | 61.53 | 62.11 | 63.97 m | q, PB |
| 7 | Charlotta Sandkulla | Finland | 63.01 | x | 60.25 | 63.01 m | |
| 8 | Olena Khamaza | Ukraine | 62.80 | x | 62.41 | 62.80 m | |
| 9 | Tanya Chaudhary | India | 61.97 | x | 61.27 | 61.97 m | |
| 10 | Annika Emily Kelly | Estonia | 60.16 | 61.56 | 58.74 | 61.56 m | |
| 11 | Grace Wong Xiu Mei | Malaysia | 58.09 | 58.28 | 59.64 | 59.64 m | |
| 12 | Emma Holmgren-Löf | Sweden | x | 56.77 | x | 56.77 m | |

=== Final ===
| Place | Athlete | Nation | #1 | #2 | #3 | #4 | #5 | #6 | Result | Notes |
|---|---|---|---|---|---|---|---|---|---|---|
| 1st place, gold medalist(s) | Zhao Jie | China | 69.67 | 72.40 | 69.91 | 71.61 | 71.83 | 72.80 | 72.80 m | |
| 2nd place, silver medalist(s) | Nicola Tuthill | Ireland | 66.29 | x | 66.03 | 67.80 | 68.46 | 69.98 | 69.98 m | |
| 3rd place, bronze medalist(s) | Sara Killinen | Finland | 67.80 | x | 67.37 | 65.94 | 66.46 | 67.64 | 67.80 m | |
| 4 | Samantha Borutta | Germany | 65.16 | 63.93 | 64.68 | 64.63 | 65.19 | 67.35 | 67.35 m | |
| 5 | Aileen Kuhn | Germany | x | 67.02 | x | 65.51 | x | x | 67.02 m | |
| 6 | Emma Robbins | United States | 62.00 | 62.84 | 62.01 | 63.78 | 64.26 | 62.07 | 64.26 m | |
| 7 | Nereida Santa Cruz | Ecuador | x | 61.90 | 61.42 | x | 61.52 | 59.45 | 61.90 m | |
| 8 | Emilia Kolokotroni | Cyprus | 58.60 | 61.78 | 60.59 | 61.25 | 60.47 | 57.83 | 61.78 m | |
| 9 | Sara Forssell | Sweden | x | x | 60.66 | | | | 60.66 m | |
| 10 | Raika Murakami | Japan | 60.54 | x | x | | | | 60.54 m | |
| 11 | Mariana Pestana | Portugal | x | 57.79 | x | | | | 57.79 m | |
| — | Villő Viszkeleti | Hungary | x | x | x | | | | NM | |
