= Athletics at the 2022 Commonwealth Games – Women's hammer throw =

Women's hammer throw at the 2022 Commonwealth Games
- Venue: Alexander Stadium
- Dates: 4 August (qualification); 6 August (final)
- Competitors: 17 from 11 nations
- Winning distance: 74.08

Medalists
gold medal	Camryn Rogers	Canada
silver medal	Julia Ratcliffe	New Zealand
bronze medal	Jillian Weir	Canada

The women's hammer throw at the 2022 Commonwealth Games, as part of the athletics programme, took place in the Alexander Stadium on 4 and 6 August 2022.

The winning margin was 4.45 metres which as of 2024 is the only time the women's hammer throw has been won by more than four metres at these games.

== Records ==
Prior to this competition, the existing world and Games records were as follows:

World record	Anita Włodarczyk (POL)	82.98 m	Warsaw, Poland	28 August 2016
Commonwealth record	Camryn Rogers (CAN)	77.67 m	Tucson, United States	9 June 2022
Games record	Sultana Frizell (CAN)	71.97 m	Glasgow, Scotland	28 July 2014

== Schedule ==
The schedule was as follows:

Date	Time	Round
Thursday 4 August 2022	10:00	Qualification
Saturday 6 August 2022	19:00	Final

All times are British Summer Time (UTC+1)

== Results ==
=== Qualification ===
Across one groups, those who threw ≥68.00 m (Q) or at least the 12 best performers (q) advanced to the final.

Rank	Group	Athlete	#1	#2	#3	Result	Notes
1	A	Camryn Rogers (CAN)	74.68			74.68	GR, Q
2	A	Julia Ratcliffe (NZL)	66.41	68.73		68.73	Q
3	A	Anna Purchase (ENG)	66.45	x	x	66.45	q
4	A	Alexandra Hulley (AUS)	65.58	66.15	66.06	66.15	q
5	A	Amber Simpson (WAL)	64.56	65.67	x	65.67	q
6	A	Kaila Butler (CAN)	x	63.34	x	63.34	q
7	A	Chrystalla Kyriakou (CYP)	58.58	62.09	x	62.09	q
8	A	Nicole Bradley (NZL)	59.75	61.69	61.77	61.77	q
9	A	Oyesade Olatoye (NGR)	x	60.48	61.74	61.74	q
10	A	Jillian Weir (CAN)	x	60.96	60.51	60.96	q
11	A	Manju Bala (IND)	59.68	x	x	59.68	q
12	A	Grace Wong (MAS)	58.71	56.71	59.53	59.53	q
13	A	Sarita Singh (IND)	57.48	x	56.62	57.48	
14	A	Linda Oseso (KEN)	48.99	51.32	x	51.32	
15	A	Lucy Omondi (KEN)	46.13	48.33	47.86	48.33	
16	A	Tynelle Gumbs (IVB)	46.90	x	x	46.90	
	A	Lauren Bruce (NZL)	x	x	x	NM	

=== Final ===
The medals were determined in the final.

Rank	Name	#1	#2	#3	#4	#5	#6	Result	Notes
1st place, gold medalist(s)	Camryn Rogers (CAN)	x	x	74.08	x	x	73.89	74.08	
2nd place, silver medalist(s)	Julia Ratcliffe (NZL)	67.26	69.59	69.63	x	x	66.93	69.63	
3rd place, bronze medalist(s)	Jillian Weir (CAN)	67.14	x	67.35	x	x	x	67.35	
4	Oyesade Olatoye (NGR)	65.74	64.82	x	66.54	66.80	62.54	66.80	SB
5	Amber Simpson (WAL)	66.52	x	66.12	64.20	64.45	x	66.52	PB
6	Alexandra Hulley (AUS)	x	65.53	64.18	x	66.26	66.16	66.26	
7	Anna Purchase (ENG)	63.41	64.73	63.22	x	x	x	64.73	
8	Kaila Butler (CAN)	60.58	x	64.22	x	x	x	64.22	
9	Nicole Bradley (NZL)	60.96	63.10	61.33				63.10	
10	Grace Wong (MAS)	61.07	61.30	59.52				61.30	
11	Chrystalla Kyriakou (CYP)	57.46	60.37	60.97				60.97	
12	Manju Bala (IND)	57.26	59.95	60.96				60.96	
