= Athletics at the 2019 Pan American Games – Women's hammer throw =

Women's hammer throw at the 2019 Pan American Games
- Venue: Athletics Stadium
- Dates: August 10
- Competitors: 12 from 9 nations
- Winning distance: 74.62m

Medalists
Gold medal	Gwen Berry	United States
Silver medal	Brooke Andersen	United States
Bronze medal	Rosa Rodríguez	Venezuela

The women's hammer throw competition of the athletics events at the 2019 Pan American Games took place on the 10th of August at the 2019 Pan American Games Athletics Stadium. The defending Pan American Games champion was Rosa Rodríguez from Venezuela.

== Summary ==
Brooke Andersen took the lead with her first round 71.07m throw, with Rosa Rodríguez in second place. Andersen would not improve upon that throw throughout the competition. Rodríguez did improve with her second round 69.48m, but that was as far as she would go. Gwen Berry's second-round throw moved her from fourth place into the silver medal position. Berry improved on her fourth throw but did not get ahead of Andersen until her fifth-round throw. Berry put it all together for her final effort, 74.62 m (244 ft 9 in) to win by over 3 and a half meters.

== Awards ceremony ==
During the award ceremony, Berry cast worldwide attention for raising her fist during the National Anthem.Video on YouTube In what was seen as an extension of the National anthem protests, she called out against injustice in America "and a president who's making it worse."

"It's too important to not say something. Something has to be said. If nothing is said, nothing will be done, and nothing will be fixed, and nothing will be changed."

American fencer Race Imboden also made a protest at the games, taking a knee on the award stand.

== Records ==
Prior to this competition, the existing world and Pan American Games records were as follows:

World record	Anita Włodarczyk (POL)	82.98	Warsaw, Poland	August 28, 2016
Pan American Games record	Yipsi Moreno (CUB)	75.62	Guadalajara, Mexico	October 24, 2011

== Schedule ==
Date	Time	Round
August 10, 2019	14:00	Final

== Results ==
All times shown are in meters.

KEY:	q	Fastest non-qualifiers	Q	Qualified	NR	National record	PB	Personal best	SB	Seasonal best	DQ	Disqualified

=== Final ===
The results were as follows:

Rank	Name	Nationality	#1	#2	#3	#4	#5	#6	Mark	Notes
1st place, gold medalist(s)	Gwen Berry	United States	65.75	70.19	x	70.40	72.88	74.62	74.62	
2nd place, silver medalist(s)	Brooke Andersen	United States	71.07	x	68.90	67.95	70.89	x	71.07	
3rd place, bronze medalist(s)	Rosa Rodríguez	Venezuela	68.34	69.48	x	66.71	x	x	69.48	SB
4	Mariana Marcelino	Brazil	65.16	61.67	64.45	66.15	61.73	x	66.15	
5	Valeria Chiliquinga	Ecuador	66.11	65.61	64.77	65.78	64.56	64.68	66.11	
6	Camryn Rogers	Canada	65.64	x	65.97	x	64.81	66.09	66.09	
7	Yaritza Martínez	Cuba	62.89	65.91	59.65	65.27	56.68	64.25	65.91	
8	Jillian Weir	Canada	65.41	x	x	x	x	x	65.41	
9	Mariana García	Chile	62.16	x	63.39				63.39	
10	Jennifer Dahlgren	Argentina	x	60.29	63.22				63.22	
11	Amanda Almendáriz	Cuba	x	x	60.98				60.98	
12	Ximena Zorrilla	Peru	59.37	58.87	57.87				59.37	
