= Athletics at the 2026 Commonwealth Games – Women's hammer throw =

Women's hammer throw at the 2026 Commonwealth Games
- Venue: Scotstoun Stadium, Glasgow
- Dates: 27 July (qualification); 28 July (final)
- Competitors: 14 from 10 nations
- Winning distance: 74.91 m

Medalists
gold medal	Camryn Rogers	Canada
silver medal	Lauren Bruce	New Zealand
bronze medal	Lara Roberts	Australia

The women's hammer throw at the 2026 Commonwealth Games, as part of the athletics programme, was held in the Scotstoun Stadium on 27 and 28 July 2026.

== Records ==
Prior to this competition, the existing world, Commonwealth and Commonwealth Games records were as follows:

Women's Hammer throw
World record	82.98 m	Anita Włodarczyk (POL)	28 Aug 2016	Stadion PGE Narodowy, Warsaw, Poland
Commonwealth record	80.51 m	Camryn Rogers (CAN)	15 Sep 2025	Tokyo, Japan
Games record	74.68 m	Camryn Rogers (CAN)	4 Aug 2022	Birmingham, England

== Schedule ==
The schedule was as follows:

Date	Time	Round
27 July 2026	10:00	Qualification
28 July 2026	19:00	Final

All times are British Summer Time (UTC+1)

== Results ==
=== Qualification ===
The qualification round was held on the morning of 27 July.

Rank	Group	Athlete	Country	#1	#2	#3	Result	Notes
1	A	Camryn Rogers	Canada	x	68.81	x	68.81	q
2	A	Lauren Bruce	New Zealand	65.18	67.32	67.70	67.70	q
3	A	Lara Roberts	Australia	66.73	x	65.98	66.73	q
4	A	Charlotte Payne	England	63.30	66.72	x	66.72	q
5	A	Stephanie Ratcliffe	Australia	65.73	x	x	65.73	q
6	A	Valentina Savva	Cyprus	63.93	63.20	65.02	65.02	q
7	A	Jinaye Shomachuk	Canada	64.84	x	63.32	64.84	q
8	A	Nayoka Clunis	Jamaica	63.65	x	64.83	64.83	q
9	A	Jillian Weir	Canada	63.60	x	63.84	63.84	q
10	A	Oyesade Olatoye	Nigeria	x	62.75	x	62.75	q
11	A	Angela McAuslan-Kelly	Scotland	60.59	x	x	60.59	q
12	A	Tara Simpson-Sullivan	England	x	60.43	x	60.43	q
13	A	Amber Simpson	Wales	x	x	59.14	59.14	
14	A	Juliane Clair	Mauritius	52.11	51.49	52.53	52.53	SB

=== Final ===
The final was held on the evening of 28 July.

Rank	Athlete	Country	#1	#2	#3	#4	#5	#6	Result	Notes
1	Camryn Rogers	Canada	71.52	74.38	71.44	x	72.82	74.91	74.91	GR
2	Lauren Bruce	New Zealand	67.41	67.63	67.51	68.63	68.93	69.82	69.82	
3	Lara Roberts	Australia	65.58	68.05	64.02	67.22	66.86	x	68.05	
4	Charlotte Payne	England	66.09	67.28	x	x	65.75	67.34	67.34	
5	Jillian Weir	Canada	66.36	x	66.67	x	66.82	x	66.82	
6	Jinaye Shomachuk	Canada	x	61.88	64.25	63.45	62.87	61.62	64.25	
7	Stephanie Ratcliffe	Australia	x	x	64.01	x	x	x	64.01	
8	Oyesade Olatoye	Nigeria	61.90	x	63.27	62.15	x	60.65	63.27	
9	Tara Simpson-Sullivan	England	x	x	62.94				62.94	
10	Valentina Savva	Cyprus	60.83	x	62.27				62.27	
11	Angela McAuslan-Kelly	Scotland	x	54.26	x				54.26	
–	Nayoka Clunis	Jamaica	x	x	x				NM	
