= Echikunwoke =

- Gender: Male
- Language(s): Igbo

Origin
- Word/name: Nigeria
- Meaning: leader of men

Echikunwoke is a surname. Notable people with the surname include:

- Annette Echikunwoke (born 1996), Nigerian-American hammer thrower
- Megalyn Echikunwoke (born 1983), American actress
