= Athletics at the 2026 Asian Games – Women's hammer throw =

Women's hammer throw at the 2026 Asian Games
- Venue: Mizuho Park Athletic Stadium, Nagoya
- Date: 29 September 2026
- Competitors: 10 from 6 nations

Medalists
gold medal	Zhang Jiale	China
silver medal	Zhao Jie	China
bronze medal	Joy McArthur	Japan

The women's hammer throw competition at the 2026 Asian Games took place on 29 September 2026 at the Mizuho Park Athletic Stadium in Nagoya, Japan. Zhang Jiale of China won the gold medal, Zhao Jie of China won the silver, and Joy McArthur of Japan won the bronze.

== Schedule ==
All times are Japan Standard Time (UTC+09:00)

Schedule
Date	Time	Event
Tuesday, 29 September 2026	19:35	Final

== Records ==
Prior to this competition, the existing world, Asian and Games records were as follows.

World Record	Anita Włodarczyk (POL)	82.98	Warszawa, Poland	27 August 2016
Asian Record	Zhao Jie (CHN)	78.22	Chengdu, China	2 April 2026
Games Record	Zhang Wenxiu (CHN)	77.33	Incheon, South Korea	27 September 2014

== Results ==
Rank	Athlete	Attempt						Result	Notes
Rank	Athlete	1	2	3	4	5	6	Result	Notes
1st place, gold medalist(s)	Zhang Jiale (CHN)	74.11	74.55	75.19	78.27	X	X	78.27	AR
2nd place, silver medalist(s)	Zhao Jie (CHN)	72.47	72.48	74.83	73.07	73.55	74.74	74.83	
3rd place, bronze medalist(s)	Joy McArthur (JPN)	65.33	67.14	67.06	X	61.67	68.42	68.42	SB
4	Tanya Chaudhary (IND)	62.09	64.02	61.83	60.81	60.60	65.35	65.35	PB
5	Anushka Yadav (IND)	64.29	X	64.56	X	62.20	X	64.56	
6	Yu Ya-chien (TPE)	61.68	61.22	64.35	61.71	64.27	X	64.35	
7	Grace Wong Xiu Mei (MAS)	X	63.61	64.15	63.52	62.11	59.26	64.15	SB
8	Raika Murakami (JPN)	X	59.53	63.09	62.73	X	62.91	63.09	
9	Kim Tae-hui (KOR)	61.48	59.43	58.93				61.48	
10	Lee Yu-ra (KOR)	X	57.19	X				57.19	
