= 2023 Asian Athletics Championships – Women's hammer throw =

Women's hammer throw at the 2023 Asian Athletics Championships
- Venue: National Stadium
- Location: Bangkok, Thailand
- Dates: 13 July
- Competitors: 12 from 9 nations
- Winning distance: 69.39 m

Medalists
gold medal	Zhao Jie	China
silver medal	Joy McArthur	Japan
bronze medal	Raika Murakami	Japan

The women's hammer throw event at the 2023 Asian Athletics Championships was held on 13 July.

== Records ==
Records before the 2023 Asian Athletics Championships
Record	Athlete (nation)	Distance (m)	Location	Date
World record	Anita Włodarczyk (POL)	82.98	Warsaw, Poland	28 August 2016
Asian record	Xiao Yanling (CHN)	77.68	Chengdu, China	29 March 2014
Championship record	Wang Zheng (CHN)	75.66	Doha, Qatar	22 April 2019
World leading	Brooke Andersen (USA)	80.17	Tucson, United States	20 May 2023
Asian leading	Wang Zheng (CHN)	74.12	Chengdu, China	8 April 2023

== Results ==
Rank	Name	Nationality	#1	#2	#3	#4	#5	#6	Result	Notes
1st place, gold medalist(s)	Zhao Jie	China	67.30	69.39	69.38	68.58	69.27	67.75	69.39	
2nd place, silver medalist(s)	Joy McArthur	Japan	61.89	65.28	63.74	x	x	66.56	66.56	
3rd place, bronze medalist(s)	Raika Murakami	Japan	60.33	x	63.70	64.17	62.01	61.12	64.17	
4	Yu Ya-chien	Chinese Taipei	x	x	60.54	61.19	59.17	x	61.19	
5	Zarina Nosirshonova	Uzbekistan	58.47	60.34	59.54	57.57	57.59	61.06	61.06	
6	Park Seo-jin	South Korea	57.48	59.09	57.27	57.72	57.65	59.20	59.20	
7	Grace Wong Xiu Meijin	Malaysia	57.99	54.31	57.33	55.42	55.37	56.96	57.99	
8	Panwat Kimsrang	Thailand	57.14	54.72	55.72	52.98	x	x	57.14	
9	Mingkamon Koomphon	Thailand	56.36	52.99	57.13				57.13	
10	Elina Silamiyeva	Uzbekistan	53.89	x	56.46				56.46	
11	Zahra Arab Rostami	Iran	48.09	x	53.41				53.41	
12	Anastasiya Kaloshina	Kazakhstan	x	x	51.78				51.78	
