= Amber Simpson =

Welsh hammer thrower (born 1999)

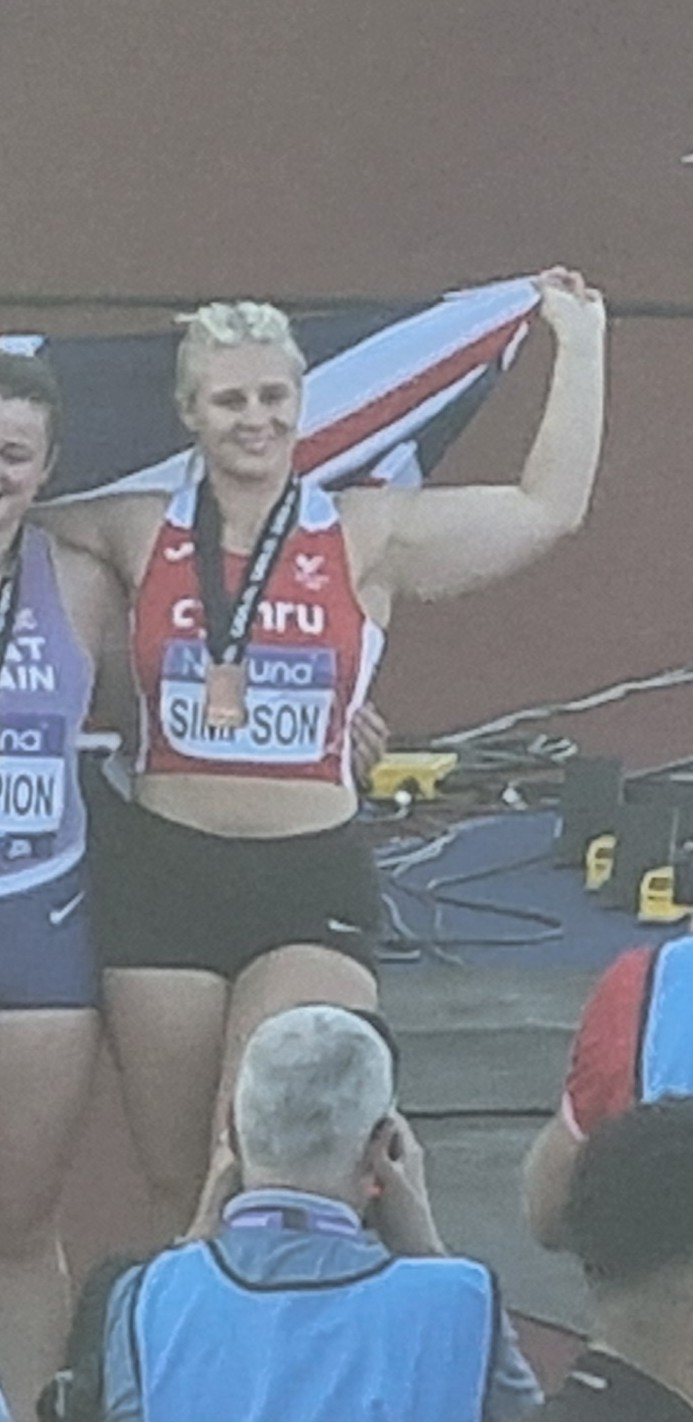
- Amber Simpson at the 2025 UK Athletics Championships

Personal information
- Nationality: British (Welsh)
- Born: 3 January 1999 (age 27)

Sport
- Sport: Athletics
- Event: Hammer throw
- Club: Wrexham AC

Achievements and titles
- Personal bests: Hammer: 70.21m (Champaign, 2024)

Amber Simpson (born 3 January 1999) is a Welsh hammer thrower. The Welsh national record holder, she finished fifth at the 2022 Commonwealth Games.

== Biography ==
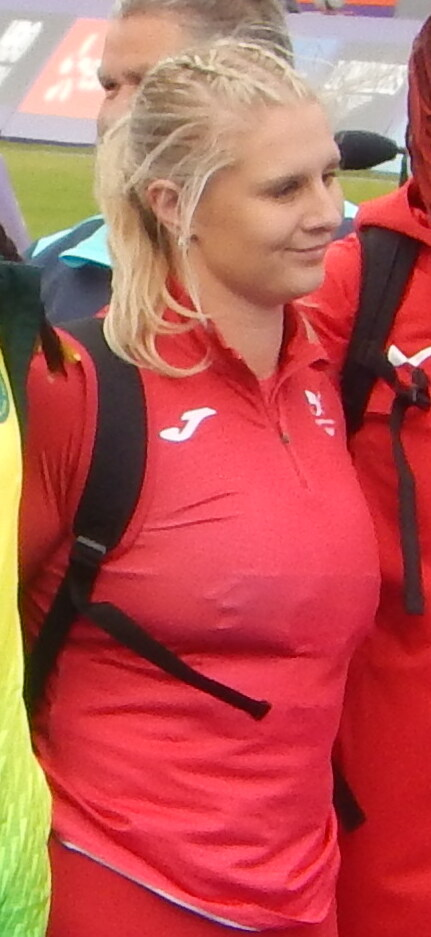
Amber Simpson at the 2026 Commonwealth Games

She is from Shotton, Flintshire and joined Deeside Athletics Club, initially as a track runner before transitioning into throwing events. She attended College at the University of Memphis and competed for Memphis Tigers track and field, in Tennessee, on a scholarship from 2019. After five years in Memphis she transferred to the University of Illinois.

She won the hammer title at the Welsh Athletics Championships in June 2022. She finished fifth overall at the 2022 Commonwealth Games in Birmingham, representing Wales with a distance of 66.52 metres. She joined Wrexham Athletics Club at the end of 2022.

She threw a distance of 67.08m in March 2023 to break the Welsh hammer record that had stood since 2014. Later that year, she retained her Welsh national title.

In April 2024, she set a new personal best of 70.21 metres competing in Illinois. coached by J.C.Lambert and Deanna Price. That summer, she finished in eighth place at the NCAA Championship with a throw of 67.73 meters to become the Fighting Illini's first All-American in the event.

She was named for her British debut for the 2025 European Throwing Cup in Cyprus. On 2 August, she placed third in the hammer throw at the 2025 UK Athletics Championships in Birmingham with 65.64 metres.

Simpson was selected to represent Wales in the hammer throw at the 2026 Commonwealth Games in Glasgow, Scotland.
