= Anna Purchase =

British athlete (born 1999)

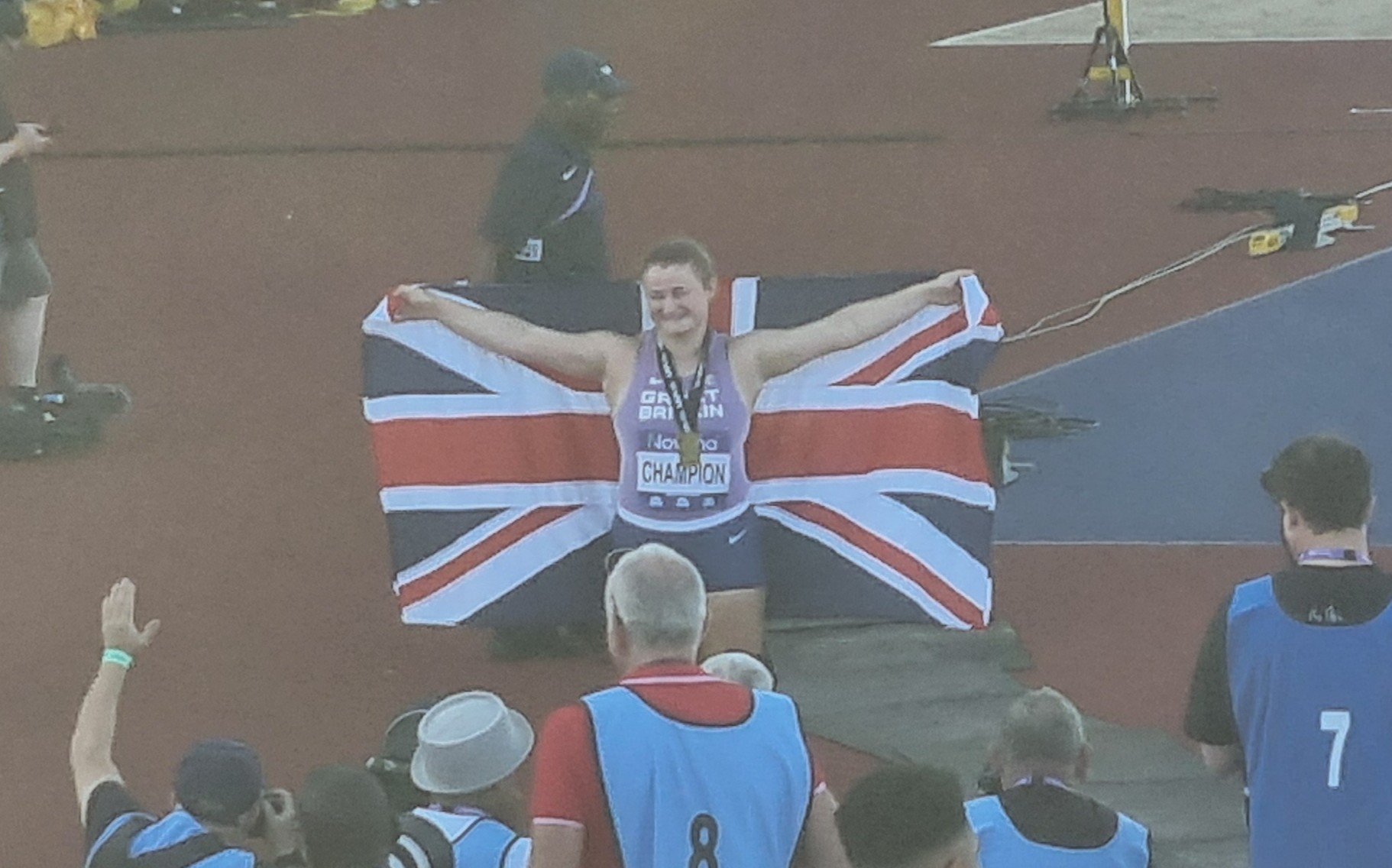
- Anna Purchase at the 2025 UK Athletics Championships

Personal information
- Nationality: British (English)
- Born: 15 September 1999 (age 26)

Sport
- Sport: Athletics
- Event: Hammer throw
- Club: Notts AC

Achievements and titles
- Personal best: 73.02m (2023)

Anna Purchase (born 15 September 1999) is an English international athlete based in the United States. She has represented England at the Commonwealth Games.

== Biography ==
Purchase was educated at the University of Nebraska and then the University of California, where she trained with future-World Champion, Camryn Rogers. She started throwing at the age of 13 and became only the second British woman to break the 70 metre barrier. She finished fourth at the 2021 European U23 Championships.

In 2022, she was selected for the women's hammer throw event at the 2022 Commonwealth Games in Birmingham. She was selected for the Great Britain and Northern Ireland squad at the 2023 World Athletics Championship in Budapest, where she reached the final.

In 2024, she became the British hammer throw champion after winning the title at the 2024 British Athletics Championships. Although Purchase met the qualification requirements for the Paris 2024 Olympics, she was not selected by British Athletics to compete and therefore was unable to take part.

Purchase won a second British title at the 2025 UK Athletics Championships, and a third the following year.
