= Ximena Zorrilla =

Peruvian hammer thrower

Personal information
- Full name: Ximena Juliana Zorrilla Suárez
- Born: 2 November 2000 (age 25)
- Education: César Vallejo University

Sport
- Sport: Athletics
- Event: Hammer throw
Medal record
Representing Peru
Women's athletics
Pan American Championships
Bronze medal – third place	2026 Medellín	Hammer throw
Ibero-American Championships
Gold medal – first place	2026 Lima	Hammer throw
Silver medal – second place	2024 Cuiabá	Hammer throw
South American Games
Silver medal – second place	2026 Santa Fe	Hammer throw
Bronze medal – third place	2022 Asunción	Hammer throw
South American Championships
Silver medal – second place	2025 Mar del Plata	Hammer throw
Bronze medal – third place	2023 São Paulo	Hammer throw
Bolivarian Games
Gold medal – first place	2022 Valledupar	Hammer throw
Bronze medal – third place	2025 Lima-Ayacucho	Hammer throw
South American U23 Championships
Gold medal – first place	2022 Cascavel	Hammer throw
Silver medal – second place	2018 Cuenca	Hammer throw
Silver medal – second place	2021 Guayaquil	Hammer throw
South American U20 Championships
Gold medal – first place	2019 Cali	Hammer throw
South American U18 Championships
Silver medal – second place	2016 Concordia	Hammer throw

Ximena Juliana Zorrilla Suárez (born 2 November 2000) is a Peruvian athlete specialising in the hammer throw. She has won multiple medals at regional level.

Her personal best in the event is 69.69 metres set in Lima in 2024. This is the standing national record.

== International competitions ==
Year	Competition	Venue	Position	Event	Notes
Representing Peru
2016	South American U18 Championships	Concordia, Argentina	2nd	Hammer throw (3 kg)	60.65 m
2017	World U18 Championships	Nairobi, Kenya	10th	Hammer throw (3 kg)	60.72 m
2017	Pan American U20 Championships	Trujillo, Peru	7th	Hammer throw	53.93 m
2018	World U20 Championships	Tampere, Finland	18th (q)	Hammer throw	56.55 m
2018	Ibero-American Championships	Trujillo, Peru	7th	Hammer throw	56.78 m
2018	South American U23 Championships	Cuenca, Ecuador	2nd	Hammer throw	61.84 m
2019	South American Championships	Lima, Peru	8th	Hammer throw	57.21 m
2019	South American U20 Championships	Cali, Colombia	1st	Hammer throw	59.19 m
2019	Pan American U20 Championships	San José, Costa Rica	6th	Hammer throw	57.04 m
2019	Pan American Games	Lima, Peru	12th	Hammer throw	59.37 m
2021	South American Championships	Guayaquil, Ecuador	4th	Hammer throw	62.34 m NU23R
2021	South American U23 Championships	Guayaquil, Ecuador	2nd	Hammer throw	60.57 m
2021	Junior Pan American Games (U23)	Cali, Colombia	6th	Hammer throw	61.41 m
2022	Ibero-American Championships	La Nucia, Spain	4th	Hammer throw	63.46 m
2022	Bolivarian Games	Valledupar, Colombia	1st	Hammer throw	66.96 m NR
2022	South American U23 Championships	Cascavel, Brazil	1st	Hammer throw	63.71 m
2022	South American Games	Asunción, Paraguay	3rd	Hammer throw	62.78 m
2023	South American Championships	São Paulo, Brazil	3rd	Hammer throw	65.92 m
2023	Pan American Games	Santiago, Chile	8th	Hammer throw	59.99 m
2024	Ibero-American Championships	Cuiabá, Brazil	2nd	Hammer throw	68.47 m
2025	South American Championships	Mar del Plata, Argentina	2nd	Hammer throw	67.52 m
2025	Bolivarian Games	Lima, Peru	3rd	Hammer throw	66.22 m
2026	Ibero-American Championships	Lima, Peru	1st	Hammer throw	66.32 m
2026	Pan American Championships	Medellín, Colombia	3rd	Hammer throw	69.39 m
2026	South American Games	Santa Fe, Argentina	2nd	Hammer throw	64.43 m
