= 2018 IAAF World U20 Championships – Women's hammer throw =

Women's hammer throw at the 2018 World U20 Championships
- Venue: Ratina Stadium
- Dates: 12 July (qualification); 14 July (final)
- Competitors: 32 from 24 nations
- Winning distance: 64.90 m

Medalists
gold medal	Camryn Rogers	Canada
silver medal	Alyssa Wilson	United States
bronze medal	Yaritza Martínez	Cuba

The women's hammer throw at the 2018 IAAF World U20 Championships was held at Ratina Stadium on 12 and 14 July.

== Records ==
Standing records prior to the 2018 IAAF World U20 Championships in Athletics
World U20 Record	Zhang Wenxiu (CHN)	73.24	Changsha, China	24 June 2005
Championship Record	Alexandra Tavernier (FRA)	70.62	Barcelona, Spain	14 July 2012
World U20 Leading	Alyssa Wilson (USA)	66.99	Eugene, United States	7 June 2018

== Results ==
=== Qualification ===
The qualification round took place on 12 July in two groups, with Group A starting at 09:40 and Group B starting at 10:55. Athletes attaining a mark of at least 62.00 metres ( Q ) or at least the 12 best performers ( q ) qualified for the final.

Rank	Group	Name	Nationality	Round			Mark	Notes
Rank	Group	Name	Nationality	1	2	3	Mark	Notes
1	A	Tatsiana Ramanovich	Belarus	62.84			62.84	Q
2	B	Yaritza Martínez	Cuba	58.76	62.58		62.58	Q
3	B	Huang Weilu	China	56.68	60.86	61.74	61.74	q
4	B	Kateřina Skypalová	Czech Republic	58.63	60.47	61.26	61.26	q
5	B	Ana Adela Stanciu	Romania	57.74	55.70	60.58	60.58	q
6	B	Mariana García	Chile	58.54	55.43	59.91	59.91	q
7	B	Kiira Väänänen	Finland	58.99	58.03	59.75	59.75	q
8	A	Samantha Borutta	Germany	58.21	59.36	x	59.36	q
9	B	Patrycja Maciejewska	Poland	58.53	x	59.02	59.02	q
10	A	Amanda Almendáriz	Cuba	x	58.84	x	58.84	q
11	B	Alyssa Wilson	United States	x	57.70	58.71	58.71	q
12	A	Jillian Shippee	United States	x	55.89	58.34	58.34	q
13	B	Dünya Ezgi Sayan	Turkey	56.67	55.98	57.76	57.76	
14	A	Zsanett Németh	Hungary	49.91	57.45	x	57.45	
15	B	Cecilia Desideri	Italy	57.18	x	x	57.18	
16	B	Katie Head	Great Britain	55.57	56.97	x	56.97	
17	A	Lise Lotte Jepsen	Denmark	56.61	56.26	x	56.61	
18	B	Ximena Zorrilla	Peru	56.55	54.96	55.37	56.55	
19	A	Gema Marti	Spain	54.78	56.01	55.36	56.01	
20	A	Antonella Creazzola	Venezuela	54.23	55.94	46.13	55.94	
21	B	Louise Mendes	Australia	x	53.12	55.49	55.49	
22	A	Jennifer Quick	Sweden	54.49	54.08	x	54.49	
23	B	Natalia Sánchez	Spain	x	53.79	53.95	53.95	
24	A	Lucilla Celeghini	Italy	50.67	53.32	53.54	53.54	
25	A	Elena Stefania Mitrea	Romania	52.90	x	x	52.90	
26	B	Franshesly Rodriguez	Puerto Rico	52.81	x	x	52.81	
27	B	Katsiaryna Valadkevich	Belarus	51.80	52.61	52.70	52.70	
28	A	Caitlyn Hester	Australia	51.01	52.67	50.23	52.67	
29	A	Alina Andriţchi	Moldova	x	46.75	49.46	49.46	
30	A	Nino Tsikvadze	Georgia	x	x	47.51	47.51	
	A	Camryn Rogers	Canada	x			NM	qJ
	A	Zhou Mengyuan	China	x	x	x	NM	

=== Final ===
The final took place on 14 July at 13:17.

Rank	Name	Nationality	Round						Mark	Notes
Rank	Name	Nationality	1	2	3	4	5	6	Mark	Notes
1st place, gold medalist(s)	Camryn Rogers	Canada	64.90	59.18	63.30	63.87	63.78	x	64.90	
2nd place, silver medalist(s)	Alyssa Wilson	United States	60.23	64.14	64.45	63.56	58.23	60.06	64.45	
3rd place, bronze medalist(s)	Yaritza Martínez	Cuba	60.75	60.69	x	61.72	63.82	x	63.82	
4	Huang Weilu	China	x	62.63	59.96	58.64	59.96	59.68	62.63	PB
5	Amanda Almendáriz	Cuba	61.82	x	x	x	x	x	61.82	
6	Jillian Shippee	United States	x	x	59.92	61.38	57.85	58.93	61.38	PB
7	Kateřina Skypalová	Czech Republic	59.15	59.20	61.21	61.37	x	x	61.37	
8	Kiira Väänänen	Finland	58.53	61.18	60.42	x	60.42	60.94	61.18	
9	Ana Adela Stanciu	Romania	59.70	58.04	x				59.70	
10	Mariana García	Chile	59.66	59.36	57.21				59.66	
11	Tatsiana Ramanovich	Belarus	55.60	x	59.35				59.35	
12	Samantha Borutta	Germany	56.70	58.02	58.04				58.04	
13	Patrycja Maciejewska	Poland	44.35	55.81	55.25				55.81	
