= Stephanie Ratcliffe =

Australian hammer thrower (born 2000)

Personal information
- Nationality: Australian
- Born: 29 December 2000 (age 25)
- Height: 1.79 m (5 ft 10 in)

Sport
- Sport: Athletics
- Event: Hammer throw

Achievements and titles
- Personal bests: Hammer: 73.63m (Austin, 2023) NR
Medal record
Women's athletics
Representing Australia
Oceania Championships
Silver medal – second place	2026 Darwin	Hammer throw

Stephanie Ratcliffe (born 29 December 2000) is an Australian hammer thrower. She won the Australian Athletics Championships in 2026, having previously won the 2023 and 2025 NCAA Outdoor Championships.

== Early and personal life ==
From Melbourne, she started athletics when she was five years-old. She attended Doncaster Secondary College. In 2019 she won the Australian U20 hammer throw title. Later that year, she began a scholarship at Harvard University. However, she returned to Australia at the onset of the COVID-19 pandemic and studied remotely for 18 months. She graduated with a neuroscience degree from Harvard in 2024. She was diagnosed with type 1 diabetes at the age of six years-old.

== Career ==
She represented Australia in senior competition at the Oceania Athletics Championships in 2019 and 2022.

She set an Australian national record in the hammer throw in May 2023 at the East Regional Conference Final with a collegiate-leading mark of 73.11 metres, breaking the Australian record of Bronwyn Eagles set in 2003 by two metres. She won the 2023 NCAA Division 1 Outdoor title in Austin, Texas in June 2023 with a new national record of 73.63 metres. In August 2023, she competed at the 2023 World Athletics Championships in Budapest.

After transferring to the University of Georgia, she was runner-up at the SEC Championships in May 2024. She competed in the hammer throw at the 2024 Paris Olympics.

She threw 71.37 metres to win the 2025 NCAA Outdoor Championships in Eugene, Oregon in June 2025, competing for the University of Georgia.

In September 2025, she competed in the hammer throw at the 2025 World Championships in Tokyo, Japan.

On 10 April, she won the hammer throw at the 2026 Australian Championships, with a best of 67.71 m to take the title. She was selected as part of the Australian team to compete at the 2026 Oceania Athletics Championships, winning the silver medal in the hammer throw behind defending champion Lauren Bruce of New Zealand in Darwin, Northern Territory on 20 May. She placed seventh in the final of the hammer throw at the 2026 Commonwealth Games in Glasgow, Scotland.
