= Zhao Jie =

Chinese athlete (born 2002)

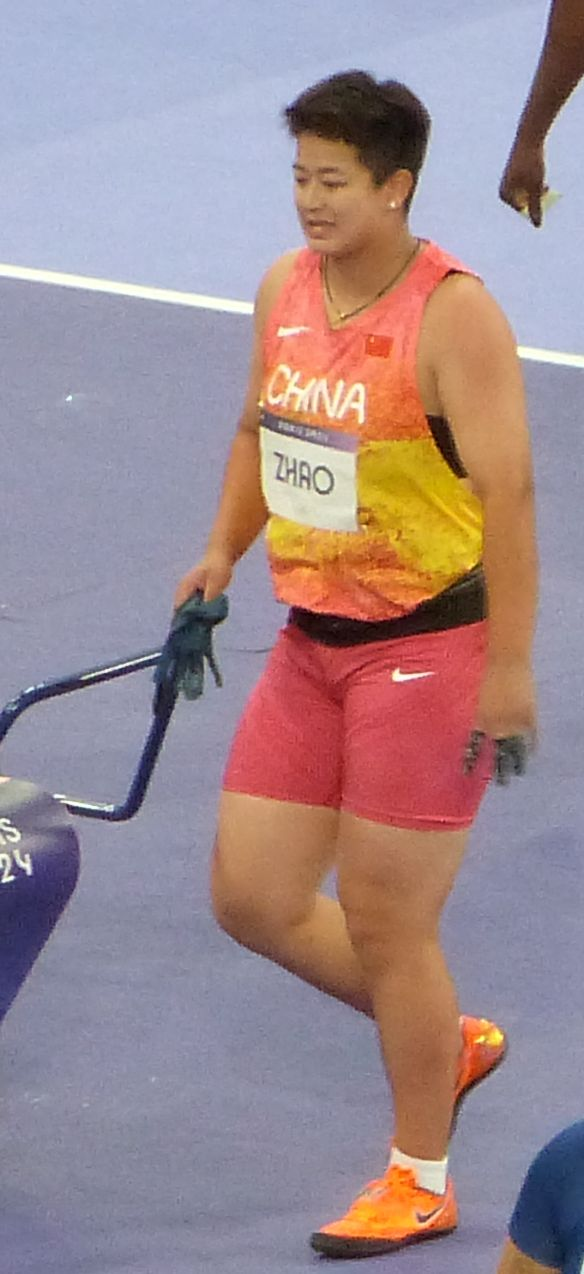
- Zhao in 2024

Personal information
- Nationality: Chinese
- Born: 13 October 2002 (age 23) Kunshan, China

Sport
- Sport: Athletics
- Event: Hammer throw

Achievements and titles
- Personal bests: Hammer: 78.22m (2026) AR
Medal record
Women's athletics
Representing China
Olympic Games
Bronze medal – third place	2024 Paris	Hammer throw
World Championships
Silver medal – second place	2025 Tokyo	Hammer throw
Asian Games
Silver medal – second place	2022 Hangzhou	Hammer throw
Silver medal – second place	2026 Nagoya	Hammer throw
Asian Championships
Gold medal – first place	2023 Bangkok	Hammer throw
Summer World University Games
Gold medal – first place	2025 Bochum	Hammer throw

Zhao Jie (born 13 October 2002) is a Chinese hammer thrower. She won the bronze medal at the 2024 Summer Olympics, and won the silver medal at the 2025 World Championships. She won the hammer throw at the 2023 Asian Athletics Championships and won the gold medal at the 2025 Summer World University Games. In 2026, she set a new Asian record of 78.22 metres.

== Biography ==
Coached by Ye Kuigang, a former international hammer thrower and two-time Chinese National Games champion, she is part of a training group with compatriot Zhang Jiale.

Zhao competed for China at the 2022 World Athletics Championships in the women's hammer throw in Eugene, Oregon. She won the silver medal the following year in the hammer throw at the delayed 2022 Asian Games in Hangzhou, China, in 2023. She also competed at the 2023 World Athletics Championships in Budapest, Hungary, in the hammer throw. She won the hammer throw at the 2023 Asian Athletics Championships in Bangkok.

In August 2024, she won the bronze medal representing China in the women's hammer throw at the 2024 Summer Olympics in Paris, France, where she made a throw of 74.27 meters to place third in the event.

She threw a personal best of 76.60m in winning the Hammerwurf-Meeting in Fränkisch-Crumbach, Germany in June 2025, finishing ahead of her compatriot Zhang Jiale who set a new under-20 world record. In July 2025, she won the gold medal with a throw of 72.80m at the 2025 World University Games in Bochum, Germany.

In September 2025, she won the silver medal in the hammer throw at the 2025 World Championships in Tokyo, Japan, throwing a new personal best distance of 77.60 metres.

In March 2026, she improved her personal best by one centimetre to 77.61m, and maintained her form on 3 April 2026, where she became the first Asian female hammer thrower to break the 78 metres barrier with 78.22 m in Chengdu, breaking the previous Asian record of 77.68m set by compatriot Wang Zheng in 2014, also in Chengdu. At the 2026 Asian Games in Japan in September, she threw 74.83 metres for the silver medal behind compatriot Zhang Jiale.
