= Joy McArthur =

Japanese hammer thrower (born 1999)

Personal information
- Full name: Joy Iris McArthur
- Born: July 5, 1999 (age 27) Mission Viejo, California, U.S.

Sport
- Sport: Athletics
- Event: Hammer throw

Achievements and titles
- Personal best: Hammer: 70.51 m (2024)
Medal record
Women's athletics
Representing Japan
Asian Games
Bronze medal – third place	2026 Nagoya	Hammer throw
Asian Championships
Silver medal – second place	2023 Bangkok	Hammer throw

Joy Iris McArthur (ジョイ・アイリス・マッカーサー, McArthur Joy Iris; born July 5, 1999) is a Japanese hammer thrower. In 2026, she won the bronze medal at the Asian Games in Nagoya. She also won the silver medal at the 2023 Asian Athletics Championships.

== Early life ==
Joy Iris McArthur was born in Mission Viejo, California on July 5, 1999. Her father is former professional basketball player Eric McArthur. Her mother is Japanese. Her older brother and younger sister are also basketball players. Because her father played for a Japanese team, McArthur came to Japan when she was five months old and grew up in Nagoya, Aichi until she was eight years old.

Following her father's departure from the team, the family returned to Dana Point, California. After returning home, McArthur took up track and field, becoming a discus thrower and shot putter. She attended Niguel Hills Middle School, Dana Hills High School, and the University of Southern California (USC).

== Athletic career ==
After enrolling at Dana Hills High School, McArthur began taking up hammer throw at the suggestion of her coach. She won the women's hammer throw at the 2016 U.S. Junior Athletics Championships with a throw of 62.07 m (203 ft 7 1/2 in). This earned her a spot on the U.S. team at the 2016 IAAF World U20 Championships in Bydgoszcz, Poland, where she finished in 9th place in Heat A in the preliminaries. She continued her athletic career while enrolled at the USC and its graduate school.

In February 2022, McArthur chose Japanese citizenship and set her sights on competing in international competitions as a Japanese representative. (Note: Under the provisions of Japanese nationality law, McArthur, who was born in the United States, had to choose between Japanese and American citizenship by the time she turned 22.) Following this, she applied to World Athletics for a change in nationality, and after approval, she became a Japanese athlete and registered with the Japan Association of Athletics Federations.

On April 7, 2023, McArthur won the women's hammer throw at the Ron & Sharlene Allice Trojan Invitational at the Felix Field and Loker Stadium in Los Angeles, California, throwing 69.89 m (229 ft 3 1/2 in), setting a Japanese record, beating Yuka Murofushi's 67.77 m (222 ft 4 in) in 2004, which had stood for 19 years. On June 3, she competed in the women's hammer throw at the Japan Championships in Athletics at Nagai Stadium in Osaka, throwing 63.31 m (207 ft 8 1/2 in) on her first attempt and maintained that lead to win her Japanese title. She won the silver medal at the 2023 Asian Athletics Championships in Bangkok, Thailand.

On March 22, 2024, McArthur broke her own Japanese record in the women's hammer throw at the Ron & Sharlene Allice Trojan Invitational in Los Angeles, with a throw of 70.51 m (231 ft 3 3/4 in). She finished in fourth place at the 2025 Asian Athletics Championships in Gumi, South Korea.

At the 2026 Asian Games, McArthur won the bronze medal in the women's hammer throw, with a throw of 68.42 m (224 ft 5 1/2 in), her best throw of the season.
