= Lara Roberts =

Australian hammer thrower (born 2003)

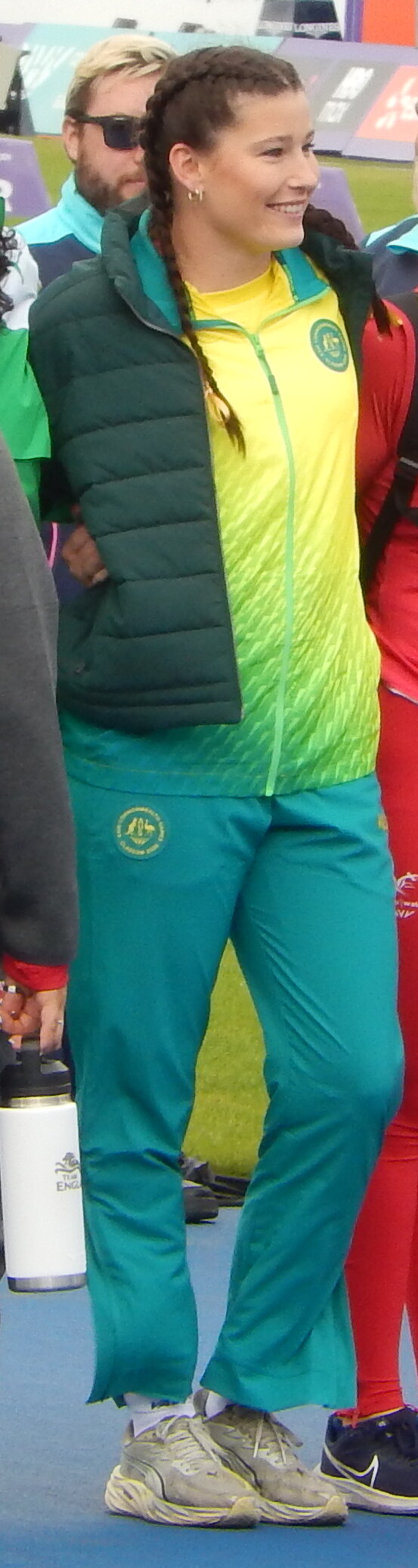

Personal information
- Nationality: Australian
- Born: 7 November 2003 (age 23)

Sport
- Sport: Athletics
- Event: Hammer throw

Achievements and titles
- Personal best: Hammer: 70.97 m (2025)
Medal record
Women's athletics
Representing Australia
Commonwealth Games
Bronze medal – third place	2026 Glasgow	Hammer throw

Lara Roberts (born 7 November 2003) is an Australian hammer thrower. She represented Australia at the 2025 World Athletics Championships and won the bronze medal at the 2026 Commonwealth Games.

== Biography ==
From Forestdale, Queensland, she attended Brisbane State High School. Her brother Ben Roberts is also an athlete, with both siblings representing Australia at the 2019 Oceania U18 Championships.

Roberts threw a personal best in the hammer throw of 70.97 metres at the Mt. SAC Relays in the United States in April 2025, competing for Texas State University. Roberts subsequently placed third overall in the hammer throw at the 2025 NCAA Championships with a throw of 70.42 metres in June. Later that year, Roberts competed for Australia at the 2025 World University Games in Germany, and the 2025 World Championships in Tokyo, Japan.

On 10 April 2026, she placed runner-up to Stephanie Ratcliffe in the hammer throw at the 2026 Australian Championships, with a best of 65.51 metres. Roberts placed sixth at the 2026 NCAA Division I Outdoor Track and Field Championships with a throw of 69.05 metres. Roberts was selected for the hammer throw at the 2026 Commonwealth Games in Glasgow, Scotland, qualifying for the final of the hammer throw on 27 July with a distance of 66.73 metres, prior to winning the bronze medal in the final the following day with a second round throw of 68.05 metres.
