= Nayoka Clunis =

Jamaican athlete (born 1995

Personal information
- Nationality: Jamaican
- Born: 7 October 1995 (age 31) Kingston, Jamaica

Sport
- Sport: Athletics
- Event: Hammer throw
- University team: Minnesota Gophers; Tennessee Lady Volunteers

Achievements and titles
- Personal best: Hammer: 72.03m (2026)
Medal record
Women's athletics
Representing Jamaica
NACAC Championships
Silver medal – second place	2025 Freeport	Hammer throw

Nayoka Clunis (born 7 October 1995) is a Jamaican hammer thrower. She is Jamaican national record holder and multiple-time national champion.

== Early life ==
A 2015 graduate of Excelsior High School where she competed in netball, volleyball, and track & field. She advanced to finals in the javelin, shot put, discus, and heptathlon at the 2015 ISSA Grace Kennedy Boys and Girls Championships. At the National Senior Trials, she placed fourth in the javelin, fifth in shot put, and 15th in discus. Notably in 2013, Nayoka won the Novel Brissett award for track and field.

Clunis moved to the United States to pursue academic qualification in conjunction with her sporting career. She attended the University of Minnesota to pursue human resource before transferring to the University of Tennessee to complete a graduate degree in sports management in 2020.

== Career ==
In 2023 Clunis won her fourth Jamaican national championship title in the hammer throw. That year, she set a lifetime best mark of 71.18 metres in Canada. She became the first Jamaican to compete in the Hammer Throw competition at the World Athletics Championships (man or woman) at the 2023 World Athletics Championships in Budapest. At the event she was hampered by discomfort in her back and did not throw 60 metres.

In May 2024, Clunis set a new national record with a 71.83m throw at the USATF Throws Festival in Tucson, Arizona breaking the previous national record of 71.48m set in 2016 by Daina Levy. That month, she was announced as one of five athletes to benefit from sponsorship by the Jamaica Olympic Association.

Although Clunis met the qualification standard for entry to the Paris 2024 Olympic Games, due to an administrative error by the Jamaica Athletic Administrative Association her name was omitted from the country's entry list to the games. Clunis was unsuccessful in an appeal to the Court of Arbitration for Sport to be allowed entry to the event.

She won the hammer throw at the 2025 Jamaican Athletics Championships in Kingston in June 2025 with a throw of 69.05 metres. She won the silver medal competing for the Jamaica at the 2025 NACAC Championships in Freeport, The Bahamas. In September 2025, she competed in the hammer throw at the 2025 World Championships in Tokyo, Japan.

In July 2026, she represented Jamaica in the hammer throw at the 2026 Commonwealth Games in Glasgow, Scotland.

== Personal life ==
Clunis is the daughter of Michelle Morgan and has one sibling, Deandre McIntosh.
