= Janee' Kassanavoid =

Native American hammer thrower (born 1995)

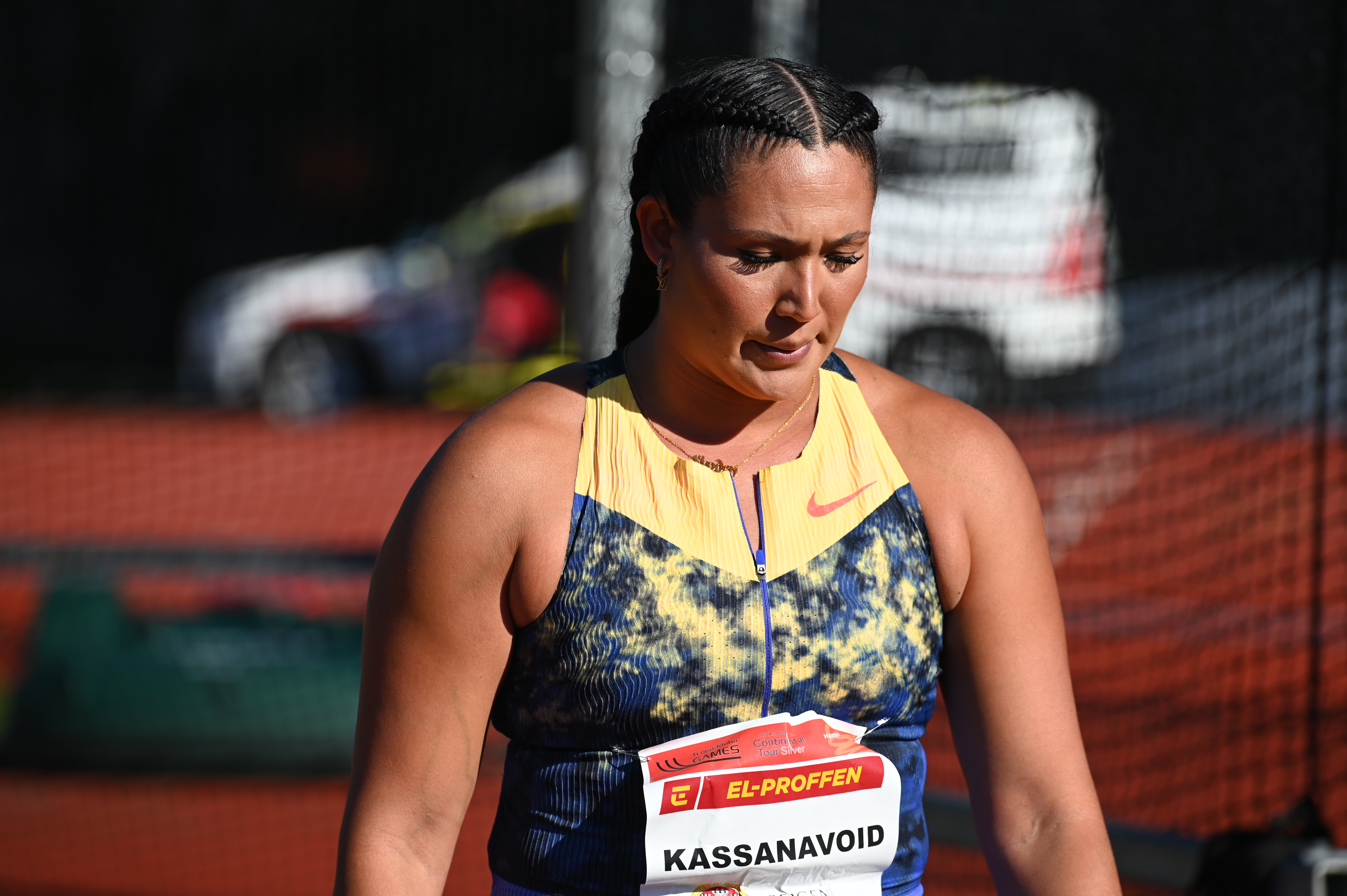
- Kassanavoid in 2026

Personal information
- Born: January 19, 1995 (age 31) Lawson, Missouri, U.S.
- Height: 175 cm (5 ft 9 in)

Sport
- Country: United States
- Sport: Track and field
- Event: Hammer throw
- College team: Kansas State University; Johnson County Community College
- Turned pro: 2018
Medal record
Women's athletics
Representing the United States
World Championships
Silver medal – second place	2023 Budapest	Hammer throw
Bronze medal – third place	2022 Eugene	Hammer throw
NACAC Championships
Gold medal – first place	2025 Freeport	Hammer throw

Janee' Kassanavoid (born January 19, 1995) is a Native American track and field athlete who specializes in the hammer throw.

== Professional career ==
Kassanavoid set her personal best of 78.00 m (255 ft 10 in) on April 30, 2022, in Tucson, Arizona. On July 17, 2022, at the 2022 World Athletics Championships in Eugene, Oregon, Kassanavoid won the bronze medal with a distance of 74.86 m. She is Native American—a member of the Comanche Nation—making her the first Native American woman to win a medal at the World Athletics Championships (including Olympics).

Year	Competition	Venue	Position	Event	Notes
Representing the United States
2023	2023 World Athletics Championships	Budapest, Hungary	2nd	Hammer throw	76.36 m (250 ft 6 in)
2022	2022 World Athletics Championships	Eugene, Oregon	3rd	Hammer throw	74.86 m (245 ft 7 in)
2019	The Match Europe v USA	Minsk, Belarus	4th	Hammer throw	71.26 m (233 ft 10 in)

=== US Track and Field Championships ===
Year	Competition	Venue	Position	Event	Notes
Representing Nike
2023	USA Outdoor Track and Field Championships	Eugene, Oregon	3rd	Hammer throw	76.44 m (250 ft 9 in)
2023	USA Indoor Track and Field Championships	Albuquerque, New Mexico	7th	Weight throw	23.57 m (77 ft 4 in)
2022	USA Outdoor Track and Field Championships	Eugene, Oregon	2nd	Hammer throw	76.04 m (249 ft 6 in)
2022	USA Indoor Track and Field Championships	Spokane, Washington	1st	Weight throw	24.28 m (79 ft 8 in)
Unattached
2021	United States Olympic Trials	Eugene, Oregon	4th	Hammer throw	73.45 m (241 ft 0 in)
2020	USA Indoor Track and Field Championships	Albuquerque, New Mexico	5th	Weight throw	22.40 m (73 ft 6 in)
2019	USA Outdoor Track and Field Championships	Des Moines, Iowa	5th	Hammer throw	72.02 m (236 ft 3 in)
Representing Kansas State Wildcats
2018	USA Outdoor Track and Field Championships	Des Moines, Iowa	15th	Hammer throw	48.26 m (158 ft 4 in)
2017	USA Outdoor Track and Field Championships	Sacramento, California	14th	Hammer throw	63.12 m (207 ft 1 in)

== Kansas State University and Johnson County Community College ==
Janee' Kassanavoid is a 7-time Track and field All-American and 3-time Big 12 Conference champion.

Representing Kansas State Wildcats track and field
Year	Championship	Event	Distance	Place
2018	NCAA 2018 NCAA Division I Outdoor Track and Field Championships	Hammer Throw	61.51 m (201 ft 10 in)	13th
2018	Big 12 Conference Outdoor Track and Field Championships	Hammer Throw	68.21 m (223 ft 9 in)	1st
2017	NCAA 2017 NCAA Division I Outdoor Track and Field Championships	Hammer Throw	66.58 m (218 ft 5 in)	4th
2017	Big 12 Conference Outdoor Track and Field Championships	Hammer Throw	63.07 m (206 ft 11 in)	1st
2017	NCAA 2017 NCAA Division I Indoor Track and Field Championships	Weight Throw	20.71 m (67 ft 11 in)	9th
2017	Big 12 Conference Indoor Track and Field Championships	Weight Throw	21.32 m (69 ft 11 in)	1st
2016	NCAA 2016 NCAA Division I Outdoor Track and Field Championships	Hammer Throw	61.46 m (201 ft 8 in)	9th
2016	Big 12 Conference Outdoor Track and Field Championships	Hammer Throw	57.50 m (188 ft 8 in)	6th
2016	Big 12 Conference Indoor Track and Field Championships	Weight Throw	19.64 m (64 ft 5 in)	3rd
Representing Johnson County Cavaliers
Year	Championship	Event	Distance	Place
2014	National Junior College Athletic Association Outdoor Track and Field Championships			
2014	National Junior College Athletic Association Outdoor Track and Field Championships	Shot Put	12.07 m (39 ft 7 in)	15th
2014	National Junior College Athletic Association Outdoor Track and Field Championships	Discus	38.89 m (127 ft 7 in)	12th
2014	National Junior College Athletic Association Outdoor Track and Field Championships	Hammer	53.37 m (175 ft 1 in)	1st

== High school ==
Kassanavoid is a 2013 alumnus of Lawson High School in Lawson, Missouri.

Representing Lawson High School Lady Cardinals
Year	Missouri State High School Activities Association Outdoor Track and Field Championships
2013	Shot Put 11.83 m (38 ft 10 in) 5th
2013	Discus 34.93 m (114 ft 7 in) 10th
2012	Shot Put 11.35 m (37 ft 3 in) 7th
2012	Discus 35.76 m (117 ft 4 in) 5th
2010	Shot Put 10.97 m (36 ft 0 in) 6th
