= Tanya Chaudhary =

Indian athlete (born 2003)

Tanya Chaudhary (born 21 September 2003) is an Indian athlete from Uttar Pradesh, who specializes in hammer throw. She qualified to represent India in the hammer throw event, along with Anushka Yadav, at the 2026 Asian Games at Nagoya, Aichi Prefecture, Japan from 19 September to 4 October 2026.

== Early life ==
Chaudhary was born in Baghpat, Uttar Pradesh. She used to train under coach Sachin Yadav at Sri Krishna Inter College Ground in Baghpat, Uttar Pradesh, which produced hammers throwers like Rakesh Yadav and Rachna Chaudhary.

== Career ==
Chaudhary won the gold medal with a throw of 61.09 metres at the 5th Indian Open Throws Competition at NIS, Patiala in March 2026. In April 2026, she also won the Indian Open athletics series 2 and 3 at Jaipur and New Delhi, respectively. She threw 62.18m at Jaipur and 61.29 at New Delhi.

On 10 September 2026, she came first again with an Indian National record of 68.35 metres at the Indian Athletics final series event at Jawaharlal Nehru Stadium, New Delhi. She improved the mark of her statemate Anushka Yadav's 67.02m set at Inter State National Championships at Bhubaneswar in June 2026.

In May 2023, she won a gold at the 26th National Federation Cup Senior Athletics Championships in Ranchi with a throw of 60.54m. In September 2023, she threw 62.60m to win the Indian Grand Prix 5 at Chandigarh.

In October 2022, she won the Indian U23 Championships at Bilaspur with a throw of 53.72m. In June 2022, she came first with a throw of 57.09m at the Indian U20 Federation Cup at Nadiad, Gujarat.
