= Brooke Andersen =

American hammer thrower (born 1995)

Personal information
- Born: August 23, 1995 (age 30) San Diego, California, US
- Height: 5 ft 9 in (175 cm)

Sport
- Country: United States
- Sport: Track and field
- Event: Hammer throw
- College team: Northern Arizona University
- Team: Nike
- Turned pro: 2018
- Coached by: Nathan Ott (2014–Present)

Achievements and titles
- Highest world ranking: 1st (2023)
- Personal bests: 80.17 m (263 ft 1/4 in), Tucson, 2023
Medal record
Women's athletics
Representing the United States
World Championships
| Gold medal – first place | 2022 Eugene | Hammer throw |
Pan American Games
| Silver medal – second place | 2019 Lima | Hammer throw |
NACAC Championships
| Silver medal – second place | 2022 Freeport | Hammer Throw |
| Bronze medal – third place | 2018 Toronto | Hammer Throw |

Brooke Andersen (born August 23, 1995) is an American track and field athlete known for throwing events. Her personal best in the hammer throw of 80.17 m (263 ft 0 in), set May 20, 2023 in Tucson, Arizona, ranks her as the #4 thrower of all time. Her personal best weight throw is 25.07 m (82 ft 3 in). On July 17, 2022, at the World Championships in Eugene, Oregon, Brooke Andersen won the gold medal with a hammer throw of 78.96 m (259 ft 1/2 in).

== NCAA career ==
Brooke Andersen was named to the 2018 Big Sky Conference student athlete team and NAU scholar-athlete of the year (2017-2018).

She competed collegiately for Northern Arizona University, finished second in the hammer at the 2017 and 2018 NCAA Championships.

In college she also threw the weight throw.

== High school career ==
Andersen won the 2013 Avocado West League discus championship with a throw of 37.27 m (122 ft 3 1/4 in).

While competing at Rancho Buena Vista High School in her hometown of Vista, California, Andersen threw the discus, placed ninth in the San Diego Section championship in 2013.

Jay Hibert, her high school coach with help from California Community College Athletic Association Hall of Fame coach Lloyd Higgins introduced her to the hammer as a high school athlete.

Brooke Andersen played 14 years of soccer as a youth through high school.

== Career ==
In the 2018 NACAC Championship, Andersen competed in the hammer for Team USA.

In both 2018 and 2019, she finished third behind DeAnna Price and Gwen Berry at the USA Outdoor Track and Field Championships (the number 4 and 5 throwers of all time respectively). The 2019 place guarantees her a spot on the American team at the 2019 World Athletics Championships. Later she won the silver medal at the 2019 Pan American Games behind Berry's last round Pan American Games record, both Americans defeating the defending champion Rosa Rodríguez. Andersen was on the medal stand when Berry raised her fist in protest of injustice in America "and a president who's making it worse".

At the 2021 Olympic Trials she placed second overall which secured her position on the Olympic Team in Tokyo. There she went on to hit the Automatic Qualifier mark and secure a spot in the Olympic final. Andersen managed to take tenth in her first Olympic Games.

In July 2022, Andersen signed with Nike.

== Achievements ==
| Year | Competition | Venue | Position | Event | Notes |
|---|---|---|---|---|---|
| 2014 | World Junior Championships | Eugene, United States | 21st (q) | Hammer throw | 54.64 m (179 ft 3 in) |
| 2018 | NACAC Championships | Toronto, Canada | 3rd | Hammer throw | 70.05 m (229 ft 9 3/4 in) |
| 2019 | Pan American Games | Lima, Peru | 2nd | Hammer throw | 71.07 m (233 ft 2 in) |
| 2019 | World Championships | Doha, Qatar | 20th (q) | Hammer throw | 68.46 m (224 ft 7 1/4 in) |
| 2021 | Olympic Games | Tokyo, Japan | 10th | Hammer throw | 72.16 m (236 ft 8 3/4 in) |
| 2022 | World Championships | Eugene, United States | 1st | Hammer throw | 78.96 m (259 ft 1/2 in) |
| 2022 | NACAC Championships | Freeport, Bahamas | 2nd | Hammer throw | 68.66 m (225 ft 3 in) |
| 2023 | World Championships | Budapest, Hungary | 25th (q) | Hammer throw | 67.72 m (222 ft 2 in) |
| 2023 | Pan American Games | Santiago, Chile | – | Hammer throw | NM |
| 2025 | World Championships | Tokyo, Japan | – | Hammer throw | NM |
