= Lauren Bruce =

New Zealand hammer thrower

Personal information
- Born: 23 March 1997 (age 29) Christchurch, New Zealand

Sport
- Country: New Zealand
- Sport: Athletics
- Event: Hammer throw

Achievements and titles
- National finals: Hammer throw champion (2022, 2023, 2024, 2025, 2026)
Medal record
Women's athletics
Representing New Zealand
Commonwealth Games
Silver medal – second place	2026 Glasgow	Hammer throw
Oceania Championships
Gold medal – first place	2024 Suva	Hammer throw

Lauren Bruce (born 23 March 1997) is a New Zealand hammer thrower who represented her country at the 2020 Summer Olympics, 2022 Commonwealth Games, 2024 Summer Olympics, and 2026 Commonwealth Games.

Between 20 September 2020 and 26 March 2021 Bruce held the Oceania Record in the hammer throw with her personal best distance of 73.47m. Bruce took the record from, and then lost the record to, fellow New Zealander Julia Ratcliffe.
