= Annette Echikunwoke =

Nigerian and American hammer thrower (born 1996)

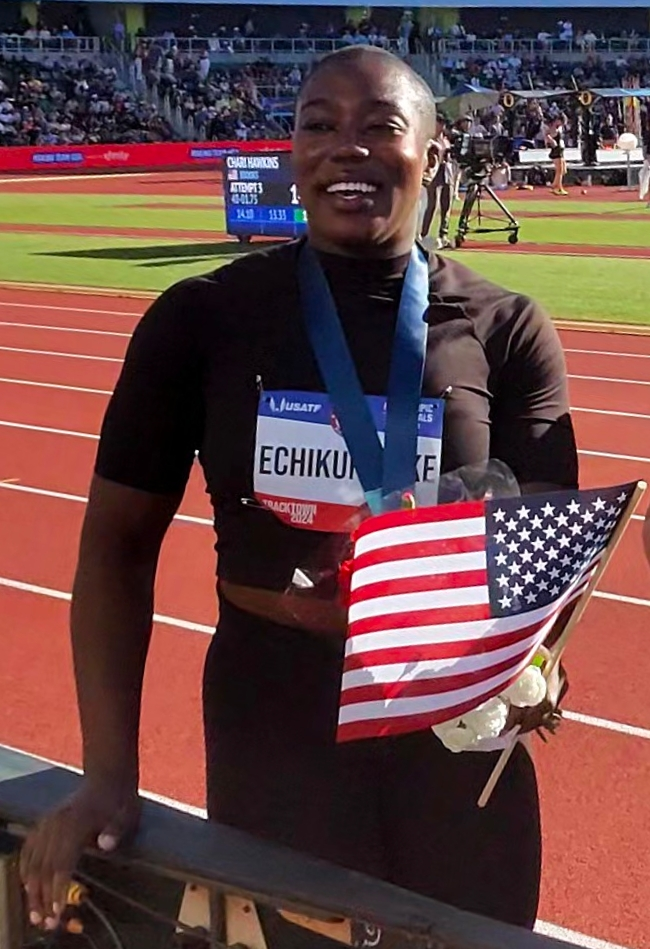
- Echikunwoke at the 2024 United States Olympic trials

Personal information
- Full name: Annette Nneka Echikunwoke
- Born: July 29, 1996 (age 29) Pickerington, Ohio, U.S.
- Height: 6 ft 0 in (183 cm)

Sport
- Country: United States
- Sport: Athletics
- Event: Hammer throw
Medal record
Women's athletics
Representing United States
Olympic Games
Silver medal – second place	2024 Paris	Hammer throw

Annette Nneka Echikunwoke (/əˌtʃiːkəˈwoʊkeɪ/ ə-CHEE-kə-WOH-kay; born July 29, 1996) is a Nigerian and American hammer thrower who lives in Ohio, United States. She was due to represent Nigeria at the 2020 Summer Olympics, but was disqualified due to the negligence of the Athletics Federation of Nigeria. She changed allegiance and represented the United States at the 2024 Summer Olympics, winning a silver medal in the event, the first Olympic medal for the U.S. in the women's hammer throw event. She holds the African area record in hammer throw, with a throw of 75.49 m in Tucson in 2021.

== Early life ==
Annette Echikunwoke started athletic throwing events in school after she won the shot put and discus throw at a sports day event, deciding that if she was good she might as well continue. Her cousin is actress Megalyn Echikunwoke.

== Career ==
Echikunwoke is from Pickerington, Ohio and attended the University of Cincinnati for both her undergraduate and master's degree, where she was on the track and field team. With Cincinnati she won the weight throw event at the 2017 NCAA Championship, also becoming the university's first NCAA champion in track and field. In 2020, she elected to represent her parents' home country of Nigeria in Olympic national selection.

In 2021, Echikunwoke threw four successive Nigerian and African records in hammer, setting the mark at 75.49 m USATF Throws Festival in Tucson, Arizona, on May 22, 2021. She is ranked #7 in the world in the women's hammer throw; she has previously been ranked #101 in the world in women's shot put with a personal best of 16.79 m in 2017. She also throws discus and 20lb weight (a US indoor equivalent to the hammer).

Echikunwoke was due to represent Nigeria at the 2020 Summer Olympics in Tokyo, but was told on July 29, 2021 that she could not compete due to the negligence of the Nigerian Federation not setting up drug tests and not relaying her need to share her whereabouts. Ten Nigerian athletes set to compete in 2021, a large percentage of the Nigeria Olympic Committee (NOC)'s delegation, were disqualified because of the negligence of the Athletics Federation of Nigeria. The AFN said that many of its athletes based in the United States did not keep the AFN updated on their location, though they did not name Echikunwoke; she claimed that the AFN requested her location for drug testing six times, and that she provided the location but no officials ever came to perform the tests.

Echikunwoke represented the United States in the women's hammer throw at the 2024 Summer Olympics. She threw 75.48 meters, placing 2nd at the event. Her silver medal for this was the first Olympic medal for the U.S. in the women's hammer throw event.

== National titles ==
- NCAA Division I Women's Indoor Track and Field Championships
  - Weight throw: 2017
