= Jillian Weir =

Canadian hammer thrower

Personal information
- Full name: Jillian Lydia Anne Weir
- Nationality: Canadian
- Born: 9 February 1993 (age 33) Menlo Park, California, U.S.
- Home town: Kingston, Ontario, Canada

Sport
- Sport: Athletics
- Event: Hammer throw
Medal record
Women's athletics
Representing Canada
Commonwealth Games
Bronze medal – third place	2022 Birmingham	Hammer throw
NACAC Championships
Silver medal – second place	2018 Toronto	Hammer throw
Bronze medal – third place	2022 Freeport	Hammer throw
Bronze medal – third place	2025 Freeport	Hammer throw

Jillian Lydia Anne Weir (born 9 February 1993) is an American-born Canadian hammer thrower and member of the Mohawks of the Bay of Quinte First Nation. She competed in the women's hammer throw at the 2017 World Championships in Athletics. In July 2021, Weir qualified to compete at the 2020 Summer Olympics. She competed at the 2022 Commonwealth Games, in Women's hammer throw, winning a bronze medal.

== Personal life ==
Weir was born to a Jamaican-English father and Canadian mother of Mohawk descent. Weir's father, Robert Weir represented Great Britain in the discus and hammer throw, winning multiple Commonwealth Games medals.
