= Iceland at the 2026 European Athletics Championships =

- WA code: ISL
- National federation: Icelandic Athletic Federation
- Website: fri.is

in Birmingham, United Kingdom
- Competitors: 8 (5 men and 3 women)
- Medals: Gold 0 Silver 0 Bronze 0 Total 0

European Athletics Championships appearances
- 1946; 1950; 1954; 1958; 1962; 1966; 1969; 1971; 1974; 1978; 1982; 1986; 1990; 1994; 1998; 2002; 2006; 2010; 2012; 2014; 2016; 2018; 2022; 2024; 2026

Iceland competed at the 2026 European Athletics Championships in Birmingham, United Kingdom, between 10 and 16 August 2026. Eight athletes (five male and three female) are sent to represent the country.

== Medals ==
Medal	Name	Event	Date

== Results ==
The following athletes are selected to compete by the Icelandic Athletic Federation.

- including alternates

Key

- Note–Ranks given for track events are within the athlete's heat only
- Q = Qualified by place in Track Events or by standard in Field Events
- q = Qualified by time in Track Events or without standard in Field Events
- qR= Advanced to the next round by referee.
- NR = National record
- CHB = Championship best
- WL = World Leading
- PB = Personal best
- SB = Season's best
- — = Round not applicable for the event
- Bye = Athlete not required to compete in round
- DNF = Did Not Finish (Running or Race Walking Events)
- DNS = Did not start
- DQ = Disqualified
- NM = No Mark (No valid trial recorded in Field Events

Track and road events

Athlete	Event	Heat		Semifinal		Final	
Athlete	Event	Result	Rank	Result	Rank	Result	Rank
Baldvin Magnusson	Men's 10,000 m	—N/a					
Hlynur Andrésson	Men's marathon	—N/a					

Field events

Athlete	Event	Qualification		Final	
Athlete	Event	Distance	Position	Distance	Position
Guðni Valur Guðnason	Men's discus throw	57.79	20	Did not advance	
Hilmar Örn Jónsson	Men's hammer throw	76.63	7 q	77.26	7
Sindri Hrafn Guðmundsson	Men's javelin throw	79.21	11 q		
Erna Sóley Gunnarsdóttir	Women's shot put	15.72	22	Did not advance	
Guðrún Karítas Hallgrímsdóttir	Women's hammer throw	70.31	6 q	67.24	12
Elísabet Rut Rúnarsdóttir	Women's hammer throw	67.50	14	Did not advance	
