= 2022 World Athletics U20 Championships – Women's hammer throw =

Women's hammer throw at the 2022 World Athletics U20 Championships
- Venue: Estadio Olímpico Pascual Guerrero
- Dates: 3 August (qualification); 5 August (final)
- Competitors: 24 from 18 nations
- Winning distance: 67.21 m

Medalists
gold medal	Rachele Mori	Italy
silver medal	Paola Bueno Calvillo	Mexico
bronze medal	Raika Murakami	Japan

The women's hammer throw at the 2022 World Athletics U20 Championships was held at Estadio Olímpico Pascual Guerrero on 3 and 5 August 2022.

== Records ==
Standing records prior to the 2022 World Athletics U20 Championships
World U20 Record	Silja Kosonen (FIN)	73.43	Vaasa, Finland	28 June 2021
Championship Record	Silja Kosonen (FIN)	71.64	Nairobi, Kenya	21 August 2021
World U20 Leading	Rachele Mori (ITA)	68.04	Lucca, Italy	28 May 2022

== Results ==
=== Qualification ===
The qualification round took place on 3 August, in two groups, with Group A starting at 09:11 and Group B starting at 10:30. Athletes attaining a mark of at least 62.00 metres ( Q ) or at least the 12 best performers ( q ) qualified for the final.

Rank	Group	Name	Nationality	Round			Mark	Notes
Rank	Group	Name	Nationality	1	2	3	Mark	Notes
1	A	Rachele Mori	Italy	64.83			64.83	Q
2	B	Jada Julien	Germany	63.20			63.20	Q
3	A	Paola Bueno Calvillo	Mexico	63.14			63.14	Q, NU20R
4	B	Nereida Santa Cruz	Ecuador	59.72	62.37		62.37	Q, NU20R
5	B	Jázmin Csatári	Hungary	58.78	60.79	61.98	61.98	q
6	B	Nicola Tuthill	Ireland	60.70	61.43	61.87	61.87	q, PB
7	A	Audrey Jacobs	Netherlands	61.06	61.81	x	61.81	q
8	B	Valentina Savva	Cyprus	60.39	59.12	61.43	61.43	q
9	A	Villő Viszkeleti	Hungary	x	57.41	61.29	61.29	q
10	A	Raika Murakami	Japan	61.28	57.79	x	61.28	q, SB
11	A	Lara Hundertmark	Germany	x	60.09	59.66	60.09	q
12	B	Leidis Viamonte	Cuba	58.56	58.99	56.88	58.99	q
13	A	Emilia Kolokotroni	Cyprus	56.06	58.90	57.75	58.90	
14	B	Barbora Štejfová	Czech Republic	58.55	x	x	58.55	
15	A	Emily Fink	United States	x	58.52	x	58.52	
16	B	Elina Silyamiyeva	Uzbekistan	55.83	58.42	57.77	58.42	PB
17	A	Charlotta Sandkulla	Finland	x	53.48	57.53	57.53	
18	A	Catalina Rodríguez	Colombia	50.88	56.50	x	56.50	PB
19	B	Yuliia Tokarieva	Ukraine	51.68	54.81	53.73	54.81	
20	A	Valentyna Kosiv	Ukraine	53.98	54.23	52.71	54.23	
21	B	Kali Terza	United States	53.08	x	x	53.08	
	B	Florella Freyche	France	x	x	x	NM	
	A	Saga Berg	Sweden	x	x	x	NM	
	B	Thea Löfman	Sweden	x	x	x	NM	

=== Final ===
The final was held on 3 August at 15:11.

Rank	Name	Nationality	Round						Mark	Notes
Rank	Name	Nationality	1	2	3	4	5	6	Mark	Notes
1st place, gold medalist(s)	Rachele Mori	Italy	60.63	62.97	63.82	65.84	67.21	x	67.21	
2nd place, silver medalist(s)	Paola Bueno Calvillo	Mexico	x	62.06	x	59.24	60.52	62.74	62.74	
3rd place, bronze medalist(s)	Raika Murakami	Japan	61.29	61.45	56.34	61.11	x	59.15	61.45	SB
4	Valentina Savva	Cyprus	x	59.69	60.96	60.19	61.17	x	61.17	
5	Villő Viszkeleti	Hungary	61.11	60.49	60.10	60.10	x	58.84	61.11	
6	Jada Julien	Germany	60.98	x	58.95	60.59	x	60.02	60.98	
7	Audrey Jacobs	Netherlands	x	x	60.68	x	58.40	60.83	60.83	
8	Nicola Tuthill	Ireland	60.47	58.24	57.08	55.61	58.58	57.53	60.47	
9	Jázmin Csatári	Hungary	60.16	x	59.46				60.16	
10	Nereida Santa Cruz	Ecuador	60.00	x	58.34				60.00	
11	Leidis Viamonte	Cuba	58.27	58.10	x				58.27	
12	Lara Hundertmark	Germany	57.56	x	x				57.56	
