= 2023 European Athletics U23 Championships – Women's hammer throw =

Women's hammer throw at the 2023 European Athletics U23 Championships
- Venue: Leppävaara Stadium
- Location: Espoo, Finland
- Dates: 13 July (qualification); 14 July (final)
- Competitors: 21 from 14 nations
- Winning distance: 73.71 m

Medalists
gold medal	Silja Kosonen	Finland
silver medal	Charlotte Payne	Great Britain
bronze medal	Aileen Kuhn	Germany

The women's hammer throw event at the 2023 European Athletics U23 Championships was held in Espoo, Finland, at Leppävaara Stadium on 13 and 14 July.

== Records ==
Prior to the competition, the records were as follows:

European U23 record	Tatyana Lysenko (RUS)	77.06 m	Moscow, Russia	15 July 2005
Championship U23 record	Alexandra Tavernier (FRA)	72.98 m	Tallinn, Estonia	10 July 2015

== Results ==
=== Qualification ===
Qualification rules: All athletes over 66.00 m (Q) or at least 12 best (q) will advance to the final

Rank	Group	Name	Nationality	#1	#2	#3	Mark	Notes
1	A	Silja Kosonen	Finland	71.33			71.33	Q
2	A	Charlotte Payne	Great Britain	65.11	66.92		66.92	Q
3	B	Nicola Tuthill	Ireland	66.23			66.23	Q
4	B	Aileen Kuhn	Germany	x	64.45	66.10	66.10	Q
5	B	Rose Loga	France	65.66	x	65.21	65.21	q
6	A	Mariana Pestana	Portugal	63.83	62.78	64.05	64.05	q
7	A	Rachele Mori	Italy	x	63.71	63.12	63.71	q
8	B	Elísabet Rut Rúnarsdóttir	Iceland	62.04	63.66	61.00	63.66	q
9	B	Thea Löfmann	Sweden	58.69	63.46	63.49	63.49	q
10	B	Aada Koppeli	Finland	60.69	63.27	x	63.27	q
11	B	Aleksandra Nowaczewska	Poland	60.08	63.05	60.36	63.05	q
12	A	Esther Imariagbee	Germany	61.16	62.75	62.54	62.75	q
13	B	Liv Winther	Denmark	x	x	62.45	62.45	
14	A	Guðrún Karítas Hallgrímsdóttir	Iceland	54.81	62.21	60.26	62.21	
15	B	Stavroula Kosmidou	Greece	x	60.18	61.11	61.11	
16	A	Valeriia Ivanenko-Kyrylina	Ukraine	60.54	60.79	57.22	60.54	
17	A	Karolina Bomba	Poland	59.48	58.91	60.03	60.03	
18	A	Hillevi Carlsson	Sweden	58.89	x	59.57	59.57	
19	B	Emma Holmgren-Löf	Sweden	56.58	58.41	57.90	58.41	
20	A	Annika Emily Kelly	Estonia	57.31	x	52.99	57.31	
21	A	Julia Kivinen	Finland	57.23	x	55.28	57.23	

=== Final ===
Rank	Name	Nationality	#1	#2	#3	#4	#5	#6	Mark	Notes
1st place, gold medalist(s)	Silja Kosonen	Finland	73.71	72.43	72.45	70.11	72.20	67.36	73.71	CR
2nd place, silver medalist(s)	Charlotte Payne	Great Britain	x	65.25	68.17	x	69.22	x	69.22	
3rd place, bronze medalist(s)	Aileen Kuhn	Germany	67.38	68.30	65.58	x	66.52	65.55	68.30	
4	Nicola Tuthill	Ireland	66.24	66.43	x	64.75	x	65.93	66.43	
5	Elísabet Rúnarsdóttir	Iceland	x	65.11	63.65	64.64	63.25	65.93	65.93	
6	Aada Koppeli	Finland	65.74	56.75	61.44	x	x	x	65.74	PB
7	Rachele Mori	Italy	57.21	x	65.14	x	65.36	64.49	65.36	
8	Esther Imariagbee	Germany	64.44	63.82	64.06	61.78	x	63.52	64.44	
9	Mariana Pestana	Spain	x	63.61	64.09				64.09	
10	Aleksandra Nowaczewska	Poland	62.92	61.84	63.79				63.79	
11	Rose Loga	France	61.61	62.63	x				62.63	
12	Thea Löfmann	Sweden	57.44	60.43	x				60.43	
