= 2025 European Athletics U23 Championships – Women's hammer throw =

Women's hammer throw at the 2025 European Athletics U23 Championships
- Venue: Fana Stadion
- Location: Bergen, Norway
- Dates: 17 July (qualification); 18 July (final)
- Competitors: 19 from 10 nations
- Winning distance: 72.53 m PB

Medalists
| gold medal | Aileen Kuhn | Germany |
| silver medal | Nicola Tuthill | Ireland |
| bronze medal | Valentina Savva | Cyprus |

The women's hammer throw event at the 2025 European Athletics U23 Championships was held in Bergen, Norway, at Fana Stadion on 17 and 18 July.

== Records ==
Prior to the competition, the records were as follows:

| Record | Athlete (nation) | Distance (m) | Location | Date |
|---|---|---|---|---|
| European U23 record | Tatyana Lysenko (RUS) | 77.06 m | Moscow, Russia | 15 July 2005 |
| Championship U23 record | Silja Kosonen (FIN) | 73.71 m | Espoo, Finland | 14 July 2023 |

== Results ==
=== Qualification ===
All athletes over 66.50 m (Q) or at least 12 best (q) will advance to the final.

| Place | Athlete | Nation | #1 | #2 | #3 | Result | Notes |
|---|---|---|---|---|---|---|---|
| 1 | Nicola Tuthill | Ireland | 66.17 | 71.33 | | 71.33 m | Q |
| 2 | Rachele Mori | Italy | x | 68.39 | | 68.39 m | Q, SB |
| 3 | Valentina Savva | Cyprus | 68.03 | | | 68.03 m | Q |
| 4 | Villő Viszkeleti | Hungary | 65.98 | 65.19 | x | 65.98 m | q |
| 5 | Kajsa Borrman | Sweden | 60.15 | 61.41 | 64.88 | 64.88 m | q |
| 6 | Jázmin Csatári | Hungary | 63.21 | 64.27 | 63.80 | 64.27 m | q, SB |
| 7 | Lara Hundertmark | Germany | 59.88 | 62.51 | 62.59 | 62.59 m | |
| 8 | Emmi Mäkäläinen | Finland | x | 58.33 | 56.53 | 58.33 m | |
| 9 | Valeriia Dmytrovska | Ukraine | 54.02 | x | 55.49 | 55.49 m | |
| — | Florella Freyche | France | x | x | x | NM | |

| Place | Athlete | Nation | #1 | #2 | #3 | Result | Notes |
|---|---|---|---|---|---|---|---|
| 1 | Aileen Kuhn | Germany | 67.96 | | | 67.96 m | Q |
| 2 | Malin Garbell | Sweden | 64.71 | 67.91 | | 67.91 m | Q, PB |
| 3 | Jada Julien | Germany | 61.07 | 60.55 | 65.43 | 65.43 m | q |
| 4 | Thea Löfman | Sweden | x | 64.14 | 65.01 | 65.01 m | q |
| 5 | Emilia Kolokotroni | Cyprus | 63.76 | 64.95 | 64.05 | 64.95 m | q |
| 6 | Audrey Jacobs | Netherlands | x | 60.20 | 64.19 | 64.19 m | q |
| 7 | Charlotta Sandkulla | Finland | x | 60.18 | 61.84 | 61.84 m | |
| 8 | Lili Zimmermann | Hungary | x | 58.68 | 58.33 | 58.68 m | |
| 9 | Keren Mbongo | Italy | 58.24 | 58.44 | x | 58.44 m | |

=== Final ===
| Place | Name | Nationality | #1 | #2 | #3 | #4 | #5 | #6 | Mark | Notes |
|---|---|---|---|---|---|---|---|---|---|---|
| 1st place, gold medalist(s) | Aileen Kuhn | Germany | x | 69.14 | 71.70 | 72.53 | x | x | 72.53 m | PB |
| 2nd place, silver medalist(s) | Nicola Tuthill | Ireland | 67.75 | 69.84 | 64.66 | 70.90 | 70.05 | x | 70.90 m | |
| 3rd place, bronze medalist(s) | Valentina Savva | Cyprus | 70.05 | x | 69.63 | 69.51 | 70.22 | 68.81 | 70.22 m | NR |
| 4 | Thea Löfman | Sweden | x | 66.85 | 65.04 | 66.53 | x | 68.31 | 68.31 m | |
| 5 | Rachele Mori | Italy | x | 66.67 | x | 68.02 | x | 67.70 | 68.02 m | |
| 6 | Malin Garbell | Sweden | 65.10 | 67.65 | 64.49 | 63.99 | x | 63.60 | 67.65 m | |
| 7 | Villő Viszkeleti | Hungary | x | 66.12 | 66.12 | 66.02 | 65.08 | 66.25 m | 66.25 | PB |
| 8 | Jada Julien | Germany | 63.66 | 66.06 | 62.73 | x | 65.60 | 62.47 | 66.06 m | |
| 9 | Emilia Kolokotroni | Cyprus | x | '64.39 | 63.60 | | | | 64.39 m | |
| 10 | Jázmin Csatári | Hungary | 61.19 | 63.04 | 63.68 | | | | 63.68 m | |
| 11 | Audrey Jacobs | Netherlands | 62.46 | 62.17 | 63.65 | | | | 63.65 m | |
| 12 | Kajsa Borrman | Sweden | x | x | x | | | | NM | |
