= 2026 European Athletics Championships – Women's hammer throw =

Women's hammer throw at the 2026 European Athletics Championships
- Venue: Alexander Stadium
- Location: Birmingham, United Kingdom
- Dates: 10 August 2026 (qualification) 12 August 2026 (final)
- Competitors: 30 (target)
- Winning distance: 76.28 m

Medalists
gold medal	Silja Kosonen	Finland
silver medal	Sara Fantini	Italy
bronze medal	Beatrice Nedberge Llano	Norway

The women's hammer throw at the 2026 European Athletics Championships took place over two rounds at the Alexander Stadium in Birmingham, United Kingdom, on 10 and 12 August 2026.

== Background ==
Records before the 2026 European Athletics Championships
Record	Athlete (nation)	Distance	Location	Date
World record	Anita Włodarczyk (POL)	82.98 m	Warsaw, Poland	28 August 2016
European record	Anita Włodarczyk (POL)	82.98 m	Warsaw, Poland	28 August 2016
Championship record	Anita Włodarczyk (POL)	78.94 m	Berlin, Germany	18 August 2018
World leading	Camryn Rogers (CAN)	81.13 m	Austin, United States	2 April 2026
European leading	Anastasiya Masalova (BLR)	77.67 m	Brest, Belarus	7 May 2026

== Qualification ==
For the women's hammer throw, the qualification period was from 27 July 2025 to 26 July 2026. Athletes qualified by achieving the entry standard of 71.50 m or better, by wildcard for the 2024 European Athletics Champion, or by their position on the World Athletics Rankings for the event. The target number was 30 athletes.

Qualification standings per 31 July 2026
QP	CP	Country	Athlete	PB	SB	Status	Details
1	1	Italy	Sara Fantini	75.77	75.62	Qualified by Wild Card	Defending European Champion
2	1	Finland	Krista Tervo	77.35	77.35	Qualified by Entry Standard	77.35 - Fana Stadion, Bergen (NOR) - 28 MAY 2026
3	2	Finland	Silja Kosonen	77.07	76.41	Qualified by Entry Standard	76.41 - Paavo Nurmen Stadion, Turku (FIN) - 03 JUN 2026
4	1	Denmark	Katrine Koch Jacobsen	75.52	75.52	Qualified by Entry Standard	75.52 - GPS Stadium, Nicosia (CYP) - 14 MAR 2026
5	1	France	Rose Loga	75.19	75.19	Qualified by Entry Standard	75.19 - Nyayo National Stadium, Nairobi (KEN) - 24 APR 2026
6	1	Poland	Anita Włodarczyk	82.98	75.01	Qualified by Entry Standard	75.01 - Estadio Vallehermoso, Madrid (ESP) - 16 JUL 2026
7	1	Iceland	Guðrún Karítas Hallgrímsdóttir	73.88	73.88	Qualified by Entry Standard	73.88 - Nyayo National Stadium, Nairobi (KEN) - 24 APR 2026
8	1	Norway	Beatrice Nedberge Llano	73.21	73.21	Qualified by Entry Standard	73.21 - Panellinios Sports Club Track, Athina (GRE) - 06 JUN 2026
9	2	Iceland	Elísabet Rut Rúnarsdóttir	73.19	73.19	Qualified by Entry Standard	73.19 - Hayward Field, Eugene, OR (USA) - 11 JUN 2026
10	1	Ireland	Nicola Tuthill	72.73	72.73	Qualified by Entry Standard	72.73 - Golęcin Stadion, Poznan (POL) - 28 JUN 2026
11	1	Great Britain & N.I.	Charlotte Payne	72.51	72.18	Qualified by Entry Standard	72.18 - Mestský Stadion Sletište, Kladno (CZE) - 09 JUN 2026
12	1	Sweden	Patricia Kamga	72.17	72.17	Qualified by Entry Standard	72.17 - Sola Arena, Karlstad (SWE) - 28 JUN 2026
13	1	Germany	Aileen Kuhn	72.53	72.11	Qualified by Entry Standard	72.11 - Sportplatz Langenbrand, Forbach (GER) - 10 MAY 2026
14	1	Greece	Stamatia Alexandra Scarvelis	71.95	69.11	Qualified by Entry Standard	71.95 - Panthessaliko Stadium, Volos (GRE) - 27 JUL 2025
15	1	Ukraine	Iryna Klymets	73.56	70.66	Qualified by World Rankings	18th - 1130 points
16	1	Hungary	Zsanett Németh	70.66	70.46	Qualified by World Rankings	19th - 1128 points
17	2	Germany	Samantha Borutta	72.14	70.28	Qualified by World Rankings	20th - 1126 points
18	2	Poland	Aleksandra Śmiech	71.14	70.84	Qualified by World Rankings	21st - 1125 points
19	2	Sweden	Malin Garbell	71.49	71.49	Qualified by World Rankings	22nd - 1124 points
20	3	Poland	Ewa Różańska	72.12	71.04	Qualified by World Rankings	23rd - 1124 points
21	3	Sweden	Rebecka Hallerth	72.62	70.29	Qualified by World Rankings	24th - 1123 points
22	1	Spain	Laura Redondo	72.00	70.89	Qualified by World Rankings	27th - 1113 points
23	1	Cyprus	Valentina Savva	70.22	69.68	Qualified by World Rankings	28th - 1113 points
reserve	4	Sweden	Grete Ahlberg	70.87	70.61	Qualified by World Rankings	31st - 1106 points
24	2	Spain	Andrea Sales	70.58	70.58	Qualified by World Rankings	35th - 1097 points
25	1	Czech Republic	Tereza Holcová	69.43	69.43	Qualified by World Rankings	38th - 1094 points
26	2	Hungary	Jázmin Csatári	69.01	69.01	Qualified by World Rankings	39th - 1091 points
27	3	Germany	Jada Julien	70.48	70.48	Qualified by World Rankings	40th - 1090 points
28	1	Albania	Yipsi Moreno	76.62	67.85	Qualified by World Rankings	43rd - 1077 points
29	1	Slovakia	Veronika Kaňuchová	69.98	68.58	Qualified by World Rankings	44th - 1077 points
30	2	Italy	Rachele Mori	69.04	68.79	Qualified by World Rankings	45th - 1071 points
reserve	3	Hungary	Réka Gyurátz	72.70	67.63	Next best by World Rankings	46th - 1068 points
reserve	3	Finland	Charlotta Sandkulla	69.37	67.31	Next best by World Rankings	50th - 1054 points
reserve	1	Portugal	Mariana Pestana	68.50	66.98	Next best by World Rankings	52nd - 1046 points
reserve	2	Greece	Stavroula Kosmidou	67.91	63.95	Next best by World Rankings	53rd - 1041 points
reserve	1	Estonia	Anna Maria Čeh	69.85	64.57	Next best by World Rankings	56th - 1034 points
reserve	4	Hungary	Villő Viszkeleti	66.47	64.58	Next best by World Rankings	58th - 1032 points
reserve	3	Italy	Keren Mbongo	65.69	65.69	Next best by World Rankings	59th - 1028 points
reserve	3	Greece	Paraskevi Poulli	64.47	64.47	Next best by World Rankings	69th - 1009 points

Bye to semi-finals	Reserve activated	Withdrawal / reserve unused

== Schedule ==
Date	Time	Round
10 August 2026	19:10	Qualification.
12 August 2026	19:45	Final

All times are local times (UTC+1)

== Results ==
=== Qualification ===
The qualification round was held on 10 August 2026, at 19:13 in the evening. All athletes meeting the Qualification Standard (Q) of 71.50 m or at least 12 best performers (q) advanced to the final.

==== Group A ====
Place	Athlete	Nation	Round			Result	Notes
Place	Athlete	Nation	#1	#2	#3	Result	Notes
1	Katrine Koch Jacobsen	Denmark	x	70.58	72.62	72.62 m	Q
2	Beatrice Nedberge Llano	Norway	72.09			72.09 m	Q
3	Krista Tervo	Finland	67.59	x	70.42	70.42 m	q
4	Aileen Kuhn	Germany	x	70.14	x	70.14 m	q
5	Aleksandra Śmiech	Poland	68.93	68.56	x	68.93 m	q
6	Elísabet Rut Rúnarsdóttir	Iceland	67.33	67.50	x	67.50 m	
7	Patricia Kamga	Sweden	67.26	x	x	67.26 m	
8	Zsanett Németh	Hungary	x	64.94	66.11	66.11 m	
9	Valentina Savva	Cyprus	65.21	65.50	x	65.50 m	
10	Jada Julien	Germany	64.66	61.76	63.04	64.66 m	
11	Tereza Holcová	Czech Republic	62.27	63.40	64.39	64.39 m	
12	Rose Loga	France	x	63.77	63.80	63.80 m	
13	Veronika Kaňuchová	Slovakia	62.24	x	62.71	62.71 m	
14	Laura Redondo	Spain	61.54	x	x	61.54 m	
15	Rachele Mori	Italy	x	59.44	60.25	60.25 m	

==== Group B ====
Place	Athlete	Nation	Round			Result	Notes
Place	Athlete	Nation	#1	#2	#3	Result	Notes
1	Silja Kosonen	Finland	72.02			72.02 m	Q
2	Sara Fantini	Italy	70.51	x	x	70.51 m	q
3	Guðrún Karítas Hallgrímsdóttir	Iceland	70.31	69.70	66.15	70.31 m	q
4	Nicola Tuthill	Ireland	67.11	70.09	67.60	70.09 m	q
5	Charlotte Payne	Great Britain & N.I.	66.52	64.55	68.89	68.89 m	q
6	Anita Włodarczyk	Poland	67.64	66.78	68.70	68.70 m	q
7	Stamatia Scarvelis	Greece	66.95	x	68.49	68.49 m	q
8	Samantha Borutta	Germany	67.62	66.38	65.61	67.62 m	
9	Iryna Klymets	Ukraine	67.38	x	x	67.38 m	
10	Grete Ahlberg	Sweden	65.53	65.13	x	65.53 m	
11	Ewa Różańska	Poland	x	65.24	x	65.24 m	
12	Malin Garbell	Sweden	64.90	x	x	64.90 m	
13	Jázmin Csatári	Hungary	64.55	61.83	62.86	64.55 m	
14	Yipsi Moreno	Albania	58.85	x	x	58.85 m	
—	Andrea Sales	Spain	x	x	x	NM	

=== Final ===
The final was held on 12 August 2026, at 19:45 in the evening.

Place	Athlete	Nation	Round						Result	Notes
Place	Athlete	Nation	#1	#2	#3	#4	#5	#6	Result	Notes
1st place, gold medalist(s)	Silja Kosonen	Finland	69.76	74.97	76.28	74.05	x	75.47	76.28 m	
2nd place, silver medalist(s)	Sara Fantini	Italy	74.35	x	73.81	74.11	73.41	72.14	74.35 m	
3rd place, bronze medalist(s)	Beatrice Nedberge Llano	Norway	72.88	x	70.38	71.86	71.27	70.23	72.88 m	
4	Anita Włodarczyk	Poland	69.75	71.81	72.37	72.23	71.24	71.67	72.37 m	
5	Nicola Tuthill	Ireland	70.30	67.30	x	70.33	69.57	69.78	70.33 m	
6	Charlotte Payne	Great Britain & N.I.	68.95	70.12	70.01	66.93	x	69.93	70.12 m	
7	Stamatia Scarvelis	Greece	67.90	68.98	67.97	x	69.42	69.54	69.54 m	SB
8	Aleksandra Śmiech	Poland	67.72	x	69.07	67.39	68.77	69.12	69.12 m	
9	Katrine Koch Jacobsen	Denmark	68.69	68.70	68.03				68.70 m	
10	Aileen Kuhn	Germany	67.71	64.05	68.24				68.24 m	
11	Krista Tervo	Finland	x	67.74	x				67.74 m	
12	Guðrún Karítas Hallgrímsdóttir	Iceland	x	x	67.24				67.24 m	
