= Iceland at the 2024 European Athletics Championships =

- Flag of Iceland
- WA code: ISL

in Rome, Italy 7 June 2024 – 12 June 2022
- Competitors: 8 (5 men and 3 women)

European Athletics Championships appearances
- 1946; 1950; 1954; 1958; 1962; 1966; 1969; 1971; 1974; 1978; 1982; 1986; 1990; 1994; 1998; 2002; 2006; 2010; 2012; 2014; 2016; 2018; 2022; 2024

Iceland competed at the 2024 European Athletics Championships in Rome, Italy from 7–12 June 2024.

== Results ==
Iceland entered the following athletes.

Key

- Q = Qualified for the next round
- q = Qualified for the next round as a fastest loser or, in field events, by position without achieving the qualifying target
- NR = National record
- PB = Personal best
- SB = Season best
- N/A = Round not applicable for the event

=== Men ===
Field events

Athlete	Event	Qualification		Final	
Athlete	Event	Distance	Position	Distance	Position
Daníel Ingi Egilsson	Long jump	7.92	14	Did not advance	
Guðni Valur Guðnason	Discus throw	59.15	24	Did not advance	
Sindri Hrafn Guðmundsson	Javelin throw	77.30	20	Did not advance	
Dagbjartur Dadi Jonsson	Javelin throw	70.44	26	Did not advance	
Hilmar Örn Jónsson	Hammer throw	72.05	24	Did not advance	

=== Women ===
Field events

Athlete	Event	Qualification		Final	
Athlete	Event	Distance	Position	Distance	Position
Erna Sóley Gunnarsdóttir	Shot put	16.26	19	Did not advance	
Guðrún Karítas Hallgrímsdóttir	Hammer throw	67.57	17	Did not advance	
Elísabet Rut Rúnarsdóttir	Hammer throw	68.02	15	Did not advance	
