= Aileen Kuhn =

German hammer thrower (born 2003)

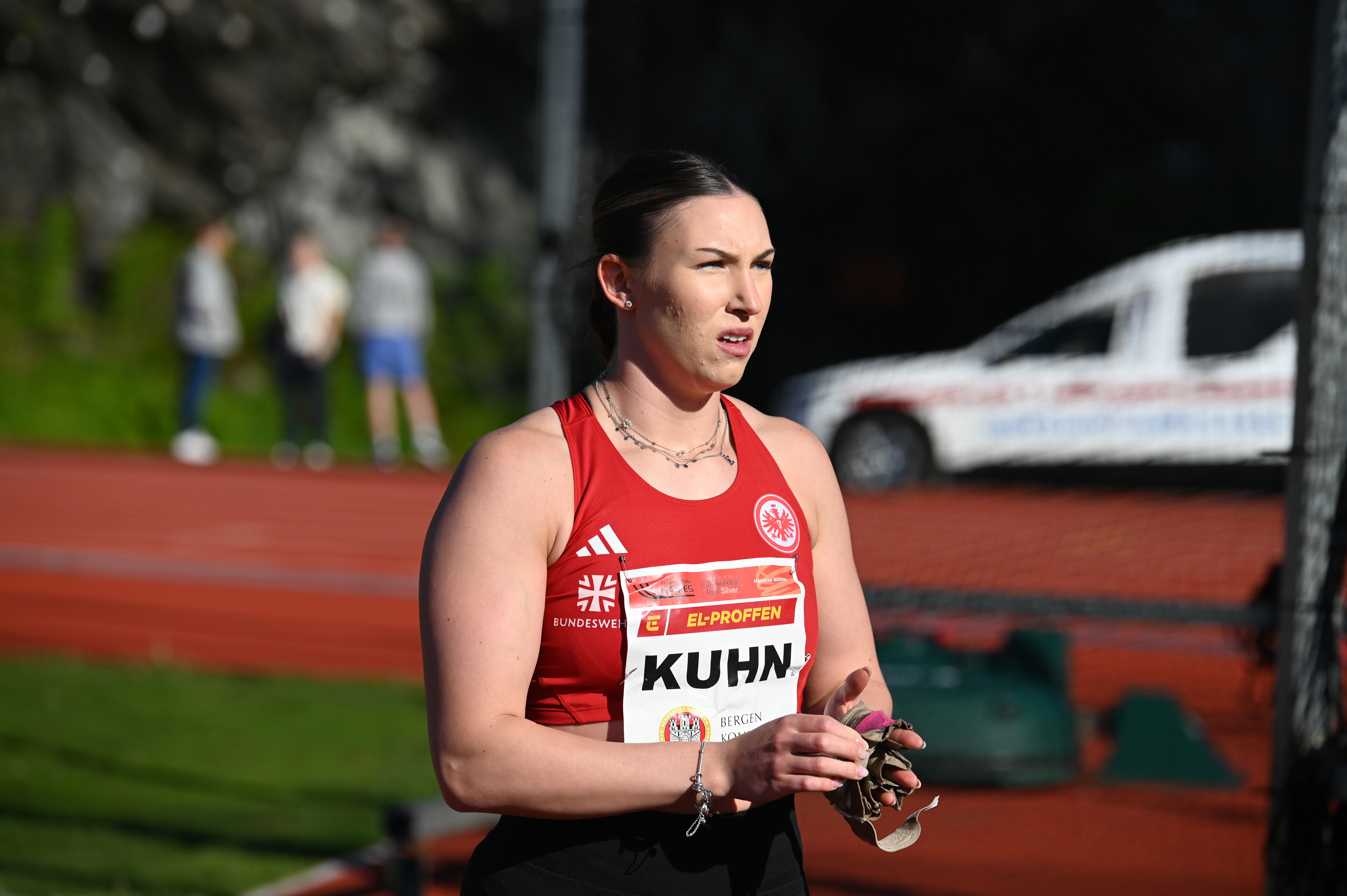
- Aileen Kuhn in 2026

Personal information
- Born: 26 November 2003 (age 22)

Sport
- Sport: Athletics
- Event: Hammer throw

Achievements and titles
- Personal bests: Hammer: 72.53 m (Bergen, 2025)
Medal record
Women's athletics
Representing Germany
European U23 Championships
Gold medal – first place	2025 Bergen	Hammer throw
Bronze medal – third place	2023 Espoo	Hammer throw

Aileen Kuhn (born 26 November 2003) is a German hammer thrower. She won the gold medal at the 2025 European Athletics U23 Championships.

== Biography ==
A member of LAZ Ludwigsburg she won the German U23 championships at the age of 19 years-old in 2023 with a throw of 68.71 metres. She won the bronze medal at the 2023 European Athletics U23 Championships in Espoo, Finland with a throw of 68.30 metres. She finished third at the senior German Athletics Championships in June 2024.

She finished third in the U23 hammer thrower at the European Throwing Cup in Nicosia, Cyprus in March 2025. She took the European U23 lead with a throw of 72.48 metres, thrown on 1 June in Forbach. She was selected for the 2025 European Athletics Team Championships First Division in Madrid, Spain on 28 June 2025, finishing fifth overall with a throw of 68.98 metres. She subsequently won the gold medal at the 2025 European Athletics U23 Championships in Bergen, Norway, throwing a lifetime best and new European U23 lead of 72.53 metres to finish ahead of Nicola Tuthill of Ireland and Valentina Savva of Cyprus, who both also threw over 70 metres on 18 July.

In September 2025, she was a finalist in the hammer throw at the 2025 World Championships in Tokyo, Japan.

In August 2026, she placed tenth in the final competing at the 2026 European Athletics Championships in Birmingham, England, in the hammer throw.
