= 2024 European Athletics Championships – Women's hammer throw =

Women's hammer throw at the 2024 European Athletics Championships
- Venue: Stadio Olimpico
- Location: Rome
- Dates: 9 June (qualification); 10 June (final)
- Competitors: 30 from 19 nations
- Winning mark: 74.18 m

Medalists
gold medal	Sara Fantini	Italy
silver medal	Anita Włodarczyk	Poland
bronze medal	Rose Loga	France

The women's hammer throw at the 2024 European Athletics Championships took place at the Stadio Olimpico on 9 and 10 June 2024.

== Records ==
Standing records prior to the 2024 European Athletics Championships
World record	Anita Włodarczyk (POL)	82.98 m	Warsaw, Poland	28 August 2016
European record	Anita Włodarczyk (POL)	82.98 m	Warsaw, Poland	28 August 2016
Championship record	Anita Włodarczyk (POL)	78.94 m	Berlin, Germany	18 August 2018
World Leading	Brooke Andersen (USA)	79.92 m	Tucson, United States	4 May 2024
Europe Leading	Zalina Marghieva (MDA)	75.95 m	Balchik, Bulgaria	21 May 2024

== Schedule ==
Date	Time	Round
9 June 2024	10:05	Qualification
10 June 2024	21:33	Final

All times are local times (UTC+2)

== Results ==
=== Qualification ===
Qualification: 71.50 m (Q) or best 12 performers (q)

Rank	Group	Name	Nationality	#1	#2	#3	Result	Note
1	A	Katrine Koch Jacobsen	Denmark	x	72.88		72.88	Q, SB
2	B	Sara Fantini	Italy	71.16	x	72.28	72.28	Q
3	B	Rose Loga	France	71.70			71.70	Q
4	B	Zalina Marghieva	Moldova	70.81	71.33	r	71.33	q
5	B	Anita Włodarczyk	Poland	69.18	71.08	71.27	71.27	q
6	B	Silja Kosonen	Finland	69.99	69.96	70.94	70.94	q
7	A	Nicola Tuthill	Ireland	65.76	69.04	69.85	69.85	q, NU23R
8	A	Malwina Kopron	Poland	67.56	68.59	69.13	69.13	q
9	A	Réka Gyurátz	Hungary	59.77	x	69.06	69.06	q, SB
10	A	Anna Purchase	Great Britain	68.91	64.56	66.44	68.91	q
11	A	Hanna Skydan	Azerbaijan	64.66	68.80	x	68.80	q
12	B	Katarzyna Furmanek	Poland	67.75	68.19	68.66	68.66	q
13	A	Rachele Mori	Italy	66.74	67.18	68.52	68.52	SB
14	B	Charlotte Payne	Great Britain	55.56	68.47	x	68.47	
15	A	Elísabet Rut Rúnarsdóttir	Iceland	x	68.02	x	68.02	
16	B	Samantha Borutta	Germany	x	68.00	x	68.00	
17	B	Guðrún Karítas Hallgrímsdóttir	Iceland	67.32	x	67.57	67.57	
18	A	Alexandra Tavernier	France	63.35	67.11	65.06	67.11	
19	B	Stamatia Scarvelis	Greece	66.06	65.93	67.10	67.10	
20	A	Bianca Florentina Ghelber	Romania	66.70	65.03	x	66.70	
21	B	Valentina Savva	Cyprus	66.58	65.91	x	66.58	
22	A	Beatrice Nedberge Llano	Norway	66.53	x	66.49	66.53	
23	A	Krista Tervo	Finland	66.16	x	65.36	66.16	
24	B	Iryna Klymets	Ukraine	64.69	66.11	x	66.11	
25	A	Grete Ahlberg	Sweden	65.18	65.47	x	65.47	
26	A	Thea Löfman	Sweden	54.65	x	64.31	64.31	
27	A	Veronika Kaňuchová	Slovakia	63.85	x	x	63.85	
28	B	Suvi Koskinen	Finland	62.72	60.59	x	62.72	
29	B	Martina Hrašnová	Slovakia	61.46	x	x	61.46	
	B	Rebecka Hallerth	Sweden	x	x	x	NM	

=== Final ===
The final was started on 10 June at 21:33. The tie between Jacobsen and Marghieva was broken by second-best throw, with Jacobsen's 70.46 metres beating Marghieva's 69.66 metres.

Rank	Name	Nationality	#1	#2	#3	#4	#5	#6	Result	Note
1st place, gold medalist(s)	Sara Fantini	Italy	70.05	72.30	72.61	74.18	70.77	70.71	74.18	SB
2nd place, silver medalist(s)	Anita Włodarczyk	Poland	71.42	71.93	71.91	72.92	72.24	71.20	72.92	SB
3rd place, bronze medalist(s)	Rose Loga	France	69.31	x	67.16	72.68	70.64	x	72.68	PB
4	Silja Kosonen	Finland	70.52	72.06	71.75	71.27	67.87	x	72.06	
5	Katrine Koch Jacobsen	Denmark	x	70.57	x	70.46	70.11	70.32	70.57	2nd best 70.46
6	Zalina Marghieva	Moldova	69.66	70.57	68.96	x	69.19	x	70.57	2nd best 69.66
7	Malwina Kopron	Poland	x	69.72	x	68.48	68.50	x	69.72	
8	Anna Purchase	Great Britain	68.15	65.78	69.24	65.96	65.84	x	69.24	
9	Nicola Tuthill	Ireland	66.85	69.09	66.29				69.09	
10	Hanna Skydan	Azerbaijan	66.27	68.10	x				68.10	
11	Katarzyna Furmanek	Poland	67.11	67.50	x				67.50	
12	Réka Gyurátz	Hungary	66.68	x	x				66.68	
