= 2021 World Athletics U20 Championships – Women's hammer throw =

Women's hammer throw at the 2021 World Athletics U20 Championships
- Venue: Kasarani Stadium
- Dates: 20 August (qualification); 21 August (final)
- Competitors: 16 from 12 nations
- Winning distance: 71.64 m

Medalists
gold medal	Silja Kosonen	Finland
silver medal	Rose Loga	France
bronze medal	Maryola Bukel	Belarus

The women's hammer throw at the 2021 World Athletics U20 Championships was held at the Kasarani Stadium on 20 and 21 August.

== Records ==
Standing records prior to the 2021 World Athletics U20 Championships
World U20 Record	Silja Kosonen (FIN)	73.43	Vaasa, Finland	28 June 2021
Championship Record	Alexandra Tavernier (FRA)	70.62	Barcelona, Spain	14 July 2012
World U20 Leading	Silja Kosonen (FIN)	73.43	Vaasa, Finland	28 June 2021

== Results ==
=== Qualification ===
The qualification took place on 20 August, in two groups, with Group A starting at 09:08 and Group B starting at 10:05. Athletes attaining a mark of at least 60.00 metres ( Q ) or at least the 12 best performers ( q ) qualified for the final.

Rank	Group	Name	Nationality	Round			Mark	Notes
Rank	Group	Name	Nationality	1	2	3	Mark	Notes
1	A	Silja Kosonen	Finland	68.46			68.46	Q
2	B	Maryola Bukel	Belarus	58.01	64.28		64.28	Q
3	B	Karolina Bomba	Poland	57.57	58.91	62.22	62.22	Q, PB
4	B	Rose Loga	France	60.72			60.72	Q
5	A	Rachele Mori	Italy	59.05	58.71	60.62	60.62	Q
6	B	Aada Koppeli	Finland	58.97	60.14		60.14	Q
7	A	Estelle Veillas	France	60.04			60.04	Q
8	B	Valentina Savva	Cyprus	58.21	59.97	55.66	59.97	q
9	A	Elísabet Rúnarsdóttir	Iceland	x	59.49	59.78	59.78	q
10	A	Barbora Štejfová	Czech Republic	59.45	x	x	59.45	q, PB
11	A	Ece Narttürk	Turkey	55.15	57.61	58.92	58.92	q
12	A	Valentina Clavería	Chile	x	56.53	58.46	58.46	q
13	B	Alisiya Naumova	Authorised Neutral Athletes	57.10	57.82	56.83	57.82	
14	B	Paola Bueno	Mexico	x	56.26	56.59	56.59	
15	A	Emilia Kolokotroni	Cyprus	54.26	53.17	x	54.26	
16	B	Emily Conte	Italy	x	54.11	x	54.11	

=== Final ===
The final was held on 21 August at 16:26.

Rank	Name	Nationality	Round						Mark	Notes
Rank	Name	Nationality	1	2	3	4	5	6	Mark	Notes
1st place, gold medalist(s)	Silja Kosonen	Finland	70.53	71.64	68.41	x	65.28	70.63	71.64	CR
2nd place, silver medalist(s)	Rose Loga	France	65.02	61.27	63.92	67.11	66.07	x	67.11	
3rd place, bronze medalist(s)	Maryola Bukel	Belarus	65.19	65.20	58.22	56.64	61.47	64.27	65.20	
4	Elísabet Rúnarsdóttir	Iceland	60.60	60.90	60.76	60.45	63.06	63.81	63.81	
5	Valentina Savva	Cyprus	59.78	62.18	x	61.50	61.21	56.97	62.18	NU20R
6	Rachele Mori	Italy	x	57.96	61.65	59.42	61.94	60.53	61.94	
7	Karolina Bomba	Poland	x	61.13	x	x	61.15	60.89	61.15	
8	Estelle Veillas	France	59.80	56.59	x	x	58.03	x	59.80	
9	Ece Narttürk	Turkey	57.56	55.92	55.65				57.56	
10	Aada Koppeli	Finland	x	56.81	x				56.81	
11	Barbora Štejfová	Czech Republic	56.64	55.03	x				56.64	
12	Valentina Clavería	Chile	x	51.46	52.41				52.41	
