= Iceland at the 2018 European Athletics Championships =

- WA code: ISL
- National federation: FRÍ
- Website: www.fri.is/forsida

in Berlin
- Competitors: 4

European Athletics Championships appearances
- 1946; 1950; 1954; 1958; 1962; 1966; 1969; 1971; 1974; 1978; 1982; 1986; 1990; 1994; 1998; 2002; 2006; 2010; 2012; 2014; 2016; 2018; 2022; 2024

Iceland competed at the 2018 European Athletics Championships in Berlin, Germany, from 6–12 August 2018. A delegation of 4 athletes were sent to represent the country.

The following athletes were selected to compete by the Icelandic Athletic Federation.

Men
Field events

Athletes	Event	Qualification		Final	
Athletes	Event	Distance	Position	Distance	Position
Guðni Valur Guðnason	Discus throw	61.36 m	16	did not advance	
Sindri Hrafn Guðmundsson	Javelin throw	74.91 m	20	did not advance	

Women
Track and road

Athletes	Event	Heats		Semifinal		Final	
Athletes	Event	Result	Rank	Result	Rank	Result	Rank
Aníta Hinriksdóttir	800 metres	2:02.15	11	DQ	DQ	did not advance	

Field events

Athletes	Event	Qualification		Final	
Athletes	Event	Distance	Position	Distance	Position
Ásdís Hjálmsdóttir	Javelin throw	58.64 m	13	did not advance	
