= 2024 World Athletics U20 Championships – Women's hammer throw =

Women's hammer throw at the 2024 World Athletics U20 Championships
- Venue: Estadio Atlético de la VIDENA
- Dates: 29 August 2024 (qualification); 31 August 2024 (final)
- Competitors: 21 from 16 nations
- Winning distance: 68.95 m

Medalists
gold medal	Zhang Jiale	China
silver medal	Valentina Savva	Cyprus
bronze medal	Villő Viszkeleti	Hungary

The women's hammer throw at the 2024 World Athletics U20 Championships was held at the Estadio Atlético de la VIDENA in Lima, Peru on 29 and 31 August 2024.

== Records ==
U20 standing records prior to the 2024 World Athletics U20 Championships were as follows:

Record	Athlete & Nationality	Mark	Location	Date
World U20 Record	Silja Kosonen (FIN)	73.43	Vaasa, Finland	28 June 2021
Championship Record	Silja Kosonen (FIN)	71.64	Nairobi, Kenya	21 August 2021
World U20 Leading	Zhang Jiale (CHN)	68.04	Huai'an, China	18 July 2024

== Results ==
=== Qualification ===
Athletes attaining a mark of at least 63.00 metres (Q) or at least the 12 best performers (q) qualified for the final.

==== Group A ====
Rank	Athlete	Nation	Round			Mark	Notes
Rank	Athlete	Nation	1	2	3	Mark	Notes
1	Zhang Jiale	China	60.31	65.73		65.73	Q
2	Nova Kienast	Germany	63.81			63.81	Q, PB
3	Villő Viszkeleti	Hungary	61.89	62.57	62.66	62.66	q
4	Emilia Kolokotroni	Cyprus	61.31	60.90	61.52	61.52	q
5	Marie Rougetet	France	59.51	60.62	58.68	60.62	q
6	Malin Garbell	Sweden	x	59.62	58.75	59.62	q
7	Ilona Verho	Finland	58.00	54.61	56.31	58.00	
8	Yarielis Torres	Puerto Rico	55.56	57.67	x	57.67	
9	Iben Dahl	Denmark	55.49	54.47	x	55.49	
10	Yenniver Veroes	Venezuela	x	55.43	x	55.43	
11	Jenna Gallaway	United States	49.08	50.97	46.80	50.97	

==== Group B ====
Rank	Athlete	Nation	Round			Mark	Notes
Rank	Athlete	Nation	1	2	3	Mark	Notes
1	Valentina Savva	Cyprus	x	65.61		65.61	Q
2	Taehui Kim	South Korea	61.70	63.45		63.45	Q
3	Polina Dzerozhynska	Ukraine	x	x	61.58	61.58	q
4	Li Zehan	China	59.38	61.36	60.48	61.36	q
5	Johanna Marrwitz	Germany	x	61.06	58.62	61.06	q
6	Emmi Mäkäläinen	Finland	60.05	x	60.36	60.36	q
7	Angela McAuslan-Kelly	Great Britain	53.31	56.46	59.31	59.31	
8	Giuliana Baigorria	Argentina	58.35	x	x	58.35	
9	Jordan Koskondy	United States	x	47.67	54.31	54.31	
10	Elvia Canela	Mexico	x	x	51.75	51.75	

=== Final ===
Rank	Athlete	Nation	Round						Mark	Notes
Rank	Athlete	Nation	1	2	3	4	5	6	Mark	Notes
1st place, gold medalist(s)	Zhang Jiale	China	68.95	63.13	67.17	68.53	x	x	68.95	
2nd place, silver medalist(s)	Valentina Savva	Cyprus	65.74	62.22	63.62	67.21	64.37	65.69	67.21	
3rd place, bronze medalist(s)	Villő Viszkeleti	Hungary	x	64.94	63.86	63.66	x	x	64.94	
4	Polina Dzerozhynska	Ukraine	62.61	62.34	59.26	61.72	x	64.07	64.07	PB
5	Nova Kienast	Germany	59.48	62.59	63.76	63.63	60.99	x	63.76	
6	Emilia Kolokotroni	Cyprus	61.33	x	63.38	61.73	63.03	63.25	63.38	
7	Johanna Marrwitz	Germany	55.79	59.07	63.10	60.76	x	60.31	63.10	
8	Malin Garbell	Sweden	61.25	62.51	61.23	x	61.58	x	62.51	
9	Li Zehan	China	54.41	59.72	60.79				60.79	
10	Taehui Kim	South Korea	60.40	60.49	x				60.49	
11	Marie Rougetet	France	x	59.99	57.64				59.99	
–	Emmi Mäkäläinen	Finland	x	x	x				NM	
