= 2022 European Throwing Cup =

International athletics competition

- Location: Leiria, Portugal
- Dates: 12–13 March

The 2022 European Throwing Cup was held from 12 to 13 March 2022 in Leiria, Portugal.

== Results ==
| WL - the best result on the world lists in 2022 | EL - the best result on European lists in 2022 | CR - European Cup record |
| NR - national record | PB - personal record | SB - the best result of the season |

=== Men ===
==== Seniors ====
| Event | Gold | | Silver | | Bronze | |
|---|---|---|---|---|---|---|
| Shot put Details Archived 2022-03-13 at the Wayback Machine | Zane Weir; Italy | 21.99 CR | Nick Ponzio; Italy | 21.83 PB | Marcus Thomsen; Norway | 20.63 |
| Discus throw Details Archived 2022-03-12 at the Wayback Machine | Kristjan Čeh; Slovenia | 66.11 | Daniel Ståhl; Sweden | 65.95 | Simon Pettersson; Sweden | 63.80 |
| Hammer Throw; Details | Bence Halász; Hungary | 76.69 | Javier Cienfuegos; Spain | 75.59 SB | Ragnar Carlsson; Sweden | 75.26 |
| Javelin throw Details Archived 2022-03-13 at the Wayback Machine | Alexandru Novac; Romania | 80.49 SB | Patriks Gailums; Latvia | 79.49 | Roberto Orlando; Italy | 78.19 SB |

==== U23 ====
| Event | Gold | | Silver | | Bronze | |
|---|---|---|---|---|---|---|
| Shot put Details Archived 2022-03-13 at the Wayback Machine | Alperen Karahan; Turkey | 19.81 EU23L | Muhamet Ramadani; Kosovo | 18.60 | Mattijs Mols; Netherlands | 18.56 |
| Discus throw Details | Martynas Alekna; Lithuania | 58.09 | Osman Kul; Turkey | 55.61 | Ruben Rolvink; Netherlands | 55.20 |
| Hammer throw Details Archived 2022-03-12 at the Wayback Machine | Mykhaylo Kokhan; Ukraine | 74.59 | Merlin Hummel; Germany | 71.73 | Giorgio Olivieri; Italy | 70.84 |
| Javelin throw Details Archived 2022-03-13 at the Wayback Machine | Teura’itera’i Tupaia; France | 77.21 SB | Leandro Ramos; Portugal | 76.48 | György Herczeg; Hungary | 74.87 |

=== Women ===
==== Seniors ====
| Event | Gold | | Silver | | Bronze | |
|---|---|---|---|---|---|---|
| Shot put Details | Auriol Dongmo; Portugal | 19.68 WL | Jessica Schilder; Netherlands | 18.89 NR | Fanny Roos; Sweden | 18.64 |
| Discus throw Details Archived 2022-03-13 at the Wayback Machine | Daisy Osakue; Italy | 61.56 | Lisa Brix Pedersen; Denmark | 61.23 | Liliana Cá; Portugal | 60.74 |
| Hammer Throw; Details Archived 2022-03-13 at the Wayback Machine | Alexandra Tavernier; France | 70.13 | Laura Redondo; Spain | 69.72 | Sara Fantini; Italy | 69.60 |
| Javelin throw Details Archived 2022-03-12 at the Wayback Machine | Līna Mūze; Latvia | 58.12 | Victoria Hudson; Austria | 57.64 | Marija Vučenović; Serbia | 57.26 |

==== U23 ====
| Event | Gold | | Silver | | Bronze | |
|---|---|---|---|---|---|---|
| Shot put Details Archived 2022-03-12 at the Wayback Machine | Pınar Akyol; Turkey | 16.30 | Amanda Ngandu-Ntumba; France | 15.93 SB | Jule Steuer; Germany | 15.81 SB |
| Discus throw Details Archived 2022-03-13 at the Wayback Machine | Amanda Ngandu-Ntumba; France | 55.38 | Alida van Daalen; Netherlands | 55.02 SB | Antonia Kinzel; Germany | 54.74 |
| Hammer Throw; Details Archived 2022-03-13 at the Wayback Machine | Ewa Różańska; Poland | 67.24 | Charlotte Payne; Great Britain | 66.72 | Elísabet Rúnarsdóttir; Iceland | 64.20 |
| Javelin throw Details Archived 2022-03-12 at the Wayback Machine | Adriana Vilagoš; Serbia | 60.72 WU20L | Kaja M. Peteersen; Norway | 58.44 PB | Julia Valtanen; Finland | 54.10 |

=== Medal table ===
==== Seniors ====
* Host nation (Portugal)

| Rank | Nation | Gold | Silver | Bronze | Total |
|---|---|---|---|---|---|
| 1 | Italy | 2 | 1 | 2 | 5 |
| 2 | Latvia | 1 | 1 | 0 | 2 |
| 3 | Portugal* | 1 | 0 | 1 | 2 |
| 4 | France | 1 | 0 | 0 | 1 |
| 4 | Hungary | 1 | 0 | 0 | 1 |
| 4 | Romania | 1 | 0 | 0 | 1 |
| 4 | Slovenia | 1 | 0 | 0 | 1 |
| 8 | Spain | 0 | 2 | 0 | 2 |
| 9 | Sweden | 0 | 1 | 3 | 4 |
| 10 | Austria | 0 | 1 | 0 | 1 |
| 10 | Denmark | 0 | 1 | 0 | 1 |
| 10 | Netherlands | 0 | 1 | 0 | 1 |
| 13 | Norway | 0 | 0 | 1 | 1 |
| 13 | Serbia | 0 | 0 | 1 | 1 |
| Totals (14 entries) | | 8 | 8 | 8 | 24 |

==== U23 ====
* Host nation (Portugal)

| Rank | Nation | Gold | Silver | Bronze | Total |
|---|---|---|---|---|---|
| 1 | France | 2 | 1 | 0 | 3 |
| 1 | Turkey | 2 | 1 | 0 | 3 |
| 3 | Lithuania | 1 | 0 | 0 | 1 |
| 3 | Poland | 1 | 0 | 0 | 1 |
| 3 | Serbia | 1 | 0 | 0 | 1 |
| 3 | Ukraine | 1 | 0 | 0 | 1 |
| 7 | Germany | 0 | 1 | 2 | 3 |
| 7 | Netherlands | 0 | 1 | 2 | 3 |
| 9 | Great Britain | 0 | 1 | 0 | 1 |
| 9 | Kosovo | 0 | 1 | 0 | 1 |
| 9 | Norway | 0 | 1 | 0 | 1 |
| 9 | Portugal* | 0 | 1 | 0 | 1 |
| 13 | Finland | 0 | 0 | 1 | 1 |
| 13 | Hungary | 0 | 0 | 1 | 1 |
| 13 | Iceland | 0 | 0 | 1 | 1 |
| 13 | Italy | 0 | 0 | 1 | 1 |
| Totals (16 entries) | | 8 | 8 | 8 | 24 |

== Participating Issue ==
Because of Russian invasion of Ukraine, Russia and Belarus were banned.
