= Iceland at the 2022 European Athletics Championships =

- Flag of Iceland
- WA code: ISL
- National federation: Icelandic Athletic Federation

in Munich, Germany 15 August 2022 – 21 August 2022
- Competitors: 3 (2 men and 1 woman) in 3 events
- Medals: Gold 0 Silver 0 Bronze 0 Total 0

European Athletics Championships appearances
- 1946; 1950; 1954; 1958; 1962; 1966; 1969; 1971; 1974; 1978; 1982; 1986; 1990; 1994; 1998; 2002; 2006; 2010; 2012; 2014; 2016; 2018; 2022; 2024

Iceland competed at the 2022 European Athletics Championships in Munich, Germany, between 15 and 21 August 2022

== Results ==
Iceland entered the following athletes.

Key

- Q = Qualified for the next round
- q = Qualified for the next round as a fastest loser or, in field events, by position without achieving the qualifying target
- NR = National record
- PB = Personal best
- SB = Season best
- N/A = Round not applicable for the event

=== Men ===
Field events

Athlete	Event	Qualification		Final	
Athlete	Event	Distance	Position	Distance	Position
Hilmar Örn Jónsson	Hammer throw	76.33 SB	7 q	70.03	12
Guðni Valur Guðnason	Discus throw	61.80	12 q	61.00	11

=== Women ===
Field events

Athlete	Event	Qualification		Final	
Athlete	Event	Distance	Position	Distance	Position
Erna Sóley Gunnarsdóttir	Shot put	16.41	22	did not advance	
