= Zhang Jiale =

Chinese hammer thrower

Personal information
- Born: 22 October 2006 (age 19) Zibo, China

Sport
- Sport: Athletics
- Event: Hammer throw
- Coached by: Ye Kuigang

Achievements and titles
- Personal bests: Hammer: 78.27 m (2026) WU20R
Medal record
Women's athletics
Representing China
World Championships
Bronze medal – third place	2025 Tokyo	Hammer throw
Asian Games
Gold medal – first place	2026 Nagoya	Hammer throw
World U20 Championships
Gold medal – first place	2024 Lima	Hammer throw
Asian U20 Championships
Gold medal – first place	2024 Dubai	Hammer throw
Asian U18 Championships
Gold medal – first place	2023 Tashkent	Hammer throw

Zhang Jiale (born 22 October 2006) is a Chinese hammer thrower. In 2025, she won the bronze medal at the senior World Athletics Championships in Tokyo, and became the U20 world record holder. She previously won the gold medal at the 2024 U20 World Championships and 2024 Asian U20 Athletics Championships, as well as the 2023 Asian U18 Championships.

== Biography ==
Born in Zibo, Shandong province, Zhang is coached by Ye Kuigang, a former international hammer thrower and two-time Chinese National Games champion, part of a training group with compatriot Zhao Jie.

Zhang threw 66.81 metres to win the hammer throw at the 2023 Asian U18 Athletics Championships in Tashkent, Uzbekistan, in April 2023. In April 2024, she won the hammer throw at the Asian Athletics U20 Championships in Dubai with a throw of 66.79 metres. She threw 68.95 metres to win the gold medal at the 2024 World Athletics U20 Championships in the hammer throw in Lima, Peru, having also qualified with the leading distance, a 65.73m effort in the second round.

She threw 75.14m at the Hammerwurf-Meeting in Fränkisch-Crumbach, Germany to break the U20 world record by 1.70 metres, in June 2025. The previous best mark was 73.43m set by the Silja Kosonen in 2021. She broke her own record in August at the Chinese Championships in Quzhou with a throw of 77.24m. In September 2025, she competed in the hammer throw at the 2025 World Championships in Tokyo, Japan, winning the bronze medal with a throw of 77.10 metres. By the end of the 2025 season, Zhang had thrown the ten furthest distances ever recorded by an under-20 athlete in the hammer throw, and had moved to fifteenth on the world all-time list. Subsequently, she won the 2025 World Athletics Rising Star Award.

In April 2026, she threw 77.15m to finish second to Zhao Jie at the Chinese throwing championships in Chengdu. On 4 July, Zhang threw a personal best 77.94 metres to win the 2026 Prefontaine Classic in the United States to move into the top-ten on the world all-time list. At the 2026 Asian Games, she set a new Asian record of 78.27 metres to win the gold medal ahead of Zhao Jie. In the weeks prior to the Games she had also thrown distance of 78.64m and 79.62m, with both throws awaiting ratification.
