= Iceland at the 2016 European Athletics Championships =

- WA code: ISL
- National federation: FRÍ
- Website: www.fri.is/forsida/

in Amsterdam
- Competitors: 5 (1 man and 4 women) in 5 events
- Medals: Gold 0 Silver 0 Bronze 0 Total 0

European Athletics Championships appearances
- 1946; 1950; 1954; 1958; 1962; 1966; 1969; 1971; 1974; 1978; 1982; 1986; 1990; 1994; 1998; 2002; 2006; 2010; 2012; 2014; 2016; 2018; 2022; 2024

Iceland competed at the 2016 European Athletics Championships in Amsterdam, Netherlands, between 6 and 10 July 2016.

== Results ==
Men

Field Events

Athlete	Event	Qualification		Final	
Athlete	Event	Distance	Rank	Distance	Rank
Guðni Valur Guðnason	Discus throw	61.20 SB	22	Did not advance	

Women

Track & road events

Athlete	Event	Heat		Semifinal		Final	
Athlete	Event	Result	Rank	Result	Rank	Result	Rank
Aníta Hinriksdóttir	800 m	2:02.44	4 Q	2:01.41	4 q	2:02.55	8
Arna Stefanía Gudmundsdóttir	400 m hurdles	57.14 PB	7 Q	57.24	18	Did not advance	

Field Events

Athlete	Event	Qualification		Final	
Athlete	Event	Distance	Rank	Distance	Rank
Hafdís Sigurdardóttir	Long jump	6.35	15	Did not advance	
Ásdís Hjálmsdóttir	Javelin throw	58.83 q	10	60.37	8
