= Patricia Kamga =

Swedish hammer thrower

Personal information
- Born: 27 July 2006 (age 20)

Sport
- Sport: Athletics
- Event: Hammer throw
Medal record
Women's athletics
Representing Sweden
European Throwing Cup
Gold medal – first place	2026 Nicosia	U23 Hammer
European Youth Olympic Festival
Gold medal – first place	2022 Banská Bystrica	Hammer

Patricia Kamga (born 27 July 2006) is a Swedish hammer thrower. She won the U23 competition at the 2026 European Throwing Cup. She previously set the Swedish national under-20 record.

== Biography ==
Kamga won the gold medal at the European Youth Olympic Festival in Banská Bystrica, Slovakia, in July 2022, with a hammer throw of 65.92 metres.

Kamga set a new Swedish junior record in the hammer throw on 16 May 2024 when she threw 67.43 metres. She set a new record of 68.01 metres in July 2025. That month, she won the Nordic under-20 title with 66.22m In August 2025, she was selected for the Swedish for the 2025 European Athletics U20 Championships in Tampere, Finland, where she qualified for the final with the best distance of all the qualifiers with 69.14m, prior to placing fourth overall.

Kamga the U23 women’s hammer throw competition with a personal best of 69.76 metres at the 2026 European Throwing Cup in Nicosia, Cyprus, on 15 March 2026. In August, she competed at the 2026 European Athletics Championships in Birmingham, England, in the hammer throw.

== Personal life ==
Kamga is the youngest sister of Swedish athlete Vanessa Kamga.
