= Albania at the 2018 European Athletics Championships =

- WA code: ALB
- National federation: AAF
- Website: www.aaf.al

in Berlin
- Competitors: 3 (2 men and 1 woman) in 3 events

European Athletics Championships appearances
- 1938; 1946–1962; 1966; 1969–1986; 1990; 1994; 1998; 2002; 2006; 2010; 2012; 2014; 2016; 2018; 2022; 2024

Albania competed at the 2018 European Athletics Championships in Berlin, Germany, from 6-12 August 2018. A delegation of 3 athletes were sent to represent the country.

The following athletes were selected to compete by the Albanian Athletics Federation.

Men
Track and road

Athletes	Event	Heats		Semifinal		Final	
Athletes	Event	Result	Rank	Result	Rank	Result	Rank
Franko Burraj	400 metres	47.56	28	did not advance			

Field events

Athletes	Event	Qualification		Final	
Athletes	Event	Distance	Position	Distance	Position
Izmir Smajlaj	Long jump	7.71 m	12	7.83 m	10

Women
Track and road

Athletes	Event	Heats		Semifinal		Final	
Athletes	Event	Result	Rank	Result	Rank	Result	Rank
Luiza Gega	3000 metres steeplechase	9:33.11	2	—		9:24.78	4
