= Federico Mori =

Italy international rugby union player

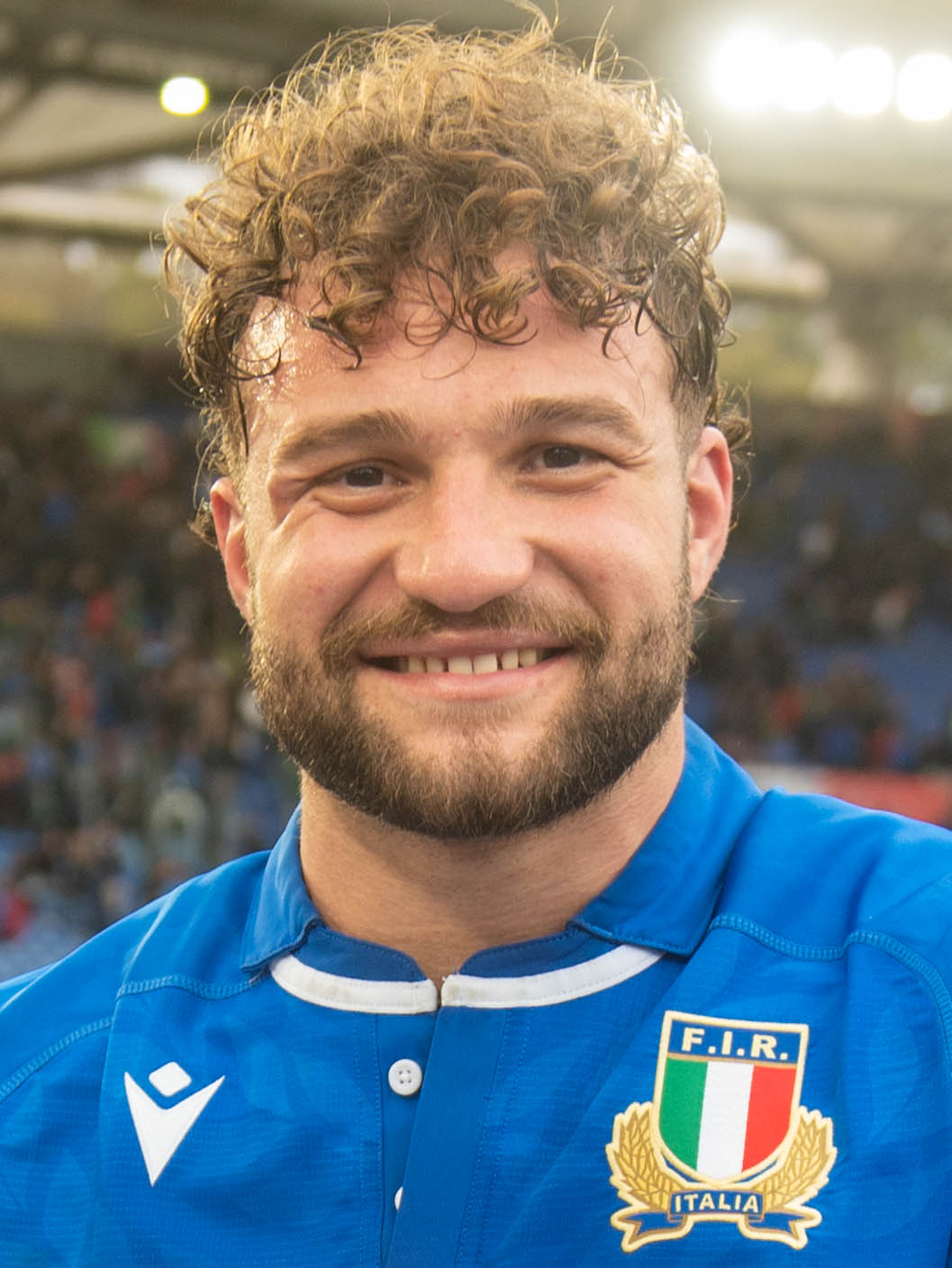
- Mori in 2024
- Born: 13 October 2000 (age 26) Cecina, Italy
- Height: 1.88 m (6 ft 2 in)
- Weight: 106 kg (16 st 10 lb; 234 lb)
- Notable relative(s): Rachele Mori (sister); Fabrizio Mori (uncle)

Rugby union career
- Position: Centre / Wing
- Current team: Bayonne
Youth career
- 2009−2015: Livorno
- 2015−2018: Granducato Livorno
Senior career
Years	Team	Apps	(Points)
2018−2019	F.I.R. Academy		
2019−2021	Calvisano	10	(20)
2019−2021	→Zebre	16	(20)
2021−2023	Bordeaux Bègles	28	(45)
2023-	Bayonne	10	(15)
- Correct as of 25 March 2024
International career
Years	Team	Apps	(Points)
2019−2020	Italy Under 20	13	(15)
2020−	Italy	17	(0)
- Correct as of 25 March 2024
National sevens team
Years	Team		Comps
2018	Italy Sevens		2

Federico Mori (born Cecina, 13 October 2000) is an Italian professional rugby union player. His usual position is Centre and he currently plays for Bayonne in the Top 14.

He is the brother of the hammer thrower Rachele Mori, both nephews of 1999 400 metres hurdles world champion Fabrizio Mori.

== Career ==
Under contract with Calvisano, for 2019–20 Pro14 and 2020–21 Pro14 seasons, he named as Permit Player for Zebre in Pro 14. From 2021 to 2023 he played for Bordeaux Bègles in Top14.

In 2018 Mori was named in the Italy Sevens squad for the 2018 Rugby Europe Sevens Grand Prix Series and in 2019 and 2020, he also was named in the Italy Under 20 squad. From October 2020 he is also part of Italy squad.
