= Albania at the 2012 European Athletics Championships =

- WA code: ALB

in Helsinki
- Competitors: 3
- Medals: Gold 0 Silver 0 Bronze 0 Total 0

European Athletics Championships appearances
- 1938; 1946–1962; 1966; 1969–1986; 1990; 1994; 1998; 2002; 2006; 2010; 2012; 2014; 2016; 2018; 2022; 2024

Albania was represented by three athletes at the 2012 European Athletics Championships in Helsinki, Finland.

== Results ==
=== Men ===
==== Field ====
| Event | Athletes | Qualification | | Final | |
| Event | Athletes | Result | Rank | Result | Rank |
|---|---|---|---|---|---|
| Shot put | Adriatik Hoxha | 17.00 | 24 | DNQ | |
| Hammer throw | Dorian Collaku | 59.92 | 30 | DNQ | |

=== Women ===
==== Track ====
| Event | Athletes | Heats | | Final | |
| Event | Athletes | Result | Rank | Result | Rank |
|---|---|---|---|---|---|
| 1500 m | Luiza Gega | 4:12.54 | 13 | DNQ | |
