= Meeting Città di Padova =

Annual track and field meet in Padua, Italy

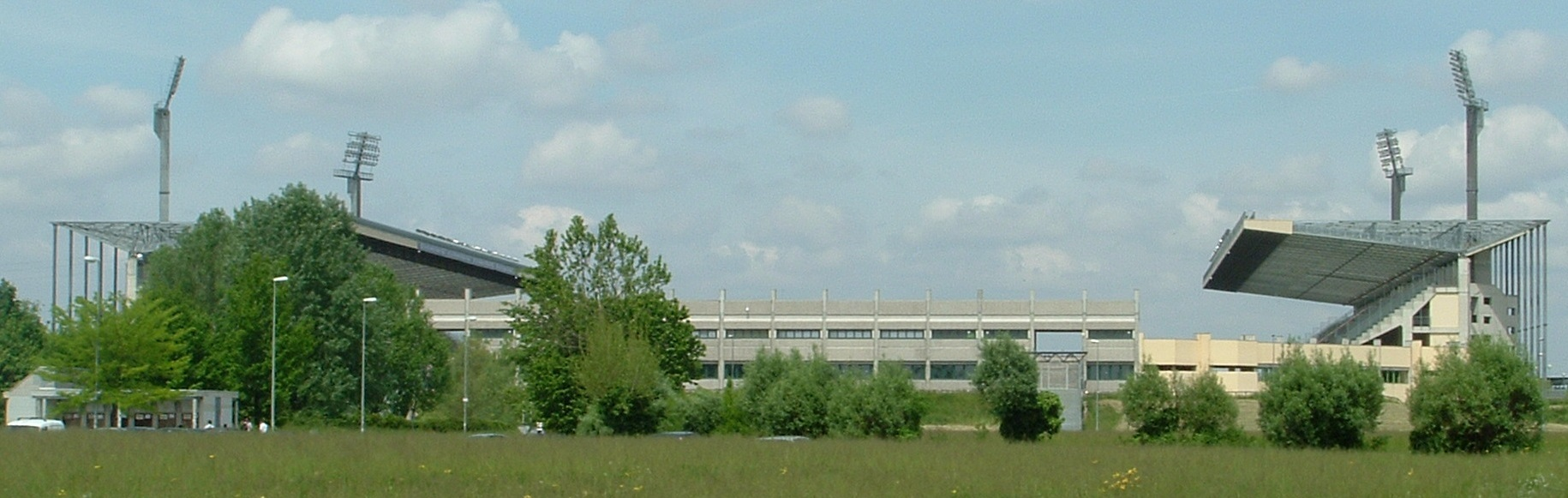
- Date: June–September
- Location: Stadio Euganeo, Padua, Italy
- Event type: Track and field
- Established: 1987

The Meeting Città di Padova is an annual track and field meet that takes place at the Daciano Colbachini Stadium in Padua, Italy. It was first held in 1987. From 1993 to 2018 the meeting was moved to the Stadio Euganeo until the Daciano Colbachini Stadium reopened the doors to athletics.

== Meeting records ==
=== Men ===
Men's meeting records of the Meeting Città di Padova
Event	Record	Athlete	Nationality	Date	Ref.
100 m	9.97 (−0.5 m/s)	Michael Norman	United States	5 September 2021	
200 m	20.25 (+1.1 m/s)	Aldemir da Silva Júnior	Brazil	16 July 2019	
400 m	44.76	Bryce Deadmon	United States	4 September 2022	
1500 m	3:33.26	Yared Nuguse	United States	4 September 2022	
110 m hurdles	13.09 (+1.7 m/s)	Sergey Shubenkov	Russia	2 September 2018	
Long jump	8.70 m	Iván Pedroso	Cuba	17 August 1995	
High jump	2.31 m	Jessé de Lima	Brazil	31 August 2008	
Shot put	22.44 m	Zane Weir	Italy	3 September 2023	
2000 m race walk	7:51.91	Massimo Stano	Italy	5 September 2021	

=== Women ===
Women's meeting records of the Meeting Città di Padova
Event	Record	Athlete	Nationality	Date	Ref.
100 m	10.94 (−1.4 m/s)	Marie-Joseé Ta Lou	Ivory Coast	4 September 2022	
400 m	50.43	Ana Fidelia Quirot	Cuba	15 September 1991	
800 m	1:57.75	Lyubov Gurina	Russia	29 August 1993	
1500 m	4:03.34	Nadia Battocletti	Italy	3 September 2023	
100 m hurdles	12.66 (+2.0 m/s)	Megan Tapper	Jamaica	16 July 2019	
400 m hurdles	53.84	Dalilah Muhammad	United States	4 September 2022	
Pole vault	4.75 m	Anzhelika Sidorova	Russia	2 September 2018	
Triple jump	14.87 m (+1.8 m/s)	Yulimar Rojas	Venezuela	16 July 2019	
2000 m race walk	9:07.67	Antonella Palmisano	Italy	5 September 2021	
