= Zane Weir =

Italian shot putter

Personal information
- Nationality: South African and Italian
- Born: 7 September 1995 (age 31) Amanzimtoti, South Africa
- Height: 190 cm (6 ft 3 in)
- Weight: 112 kg (247 lb)

Sport
- Country: Italy (2021- )
- Sport: Athletics
- Event: Shot put
- Club: Enterprise Sport & Service; G.A. Fiamme Gialle (2022- )
- Coached by: Paolo Dal Soglio

Achievements and titles
- Personal bests: Shot put outdoor: 22.44 m (2023); Shot put indoor: 22.06 m (2023) NR
Medal record
Men's athletics
Representing Italy
European Championships
Silver medal – second place	2026 Birmingham	Shot put
European Indoor Championships
Gold medal – first place	2023 Istanbul	Shot put
European Games
Gold medal – first place	2023 Kraków-Małopolska	Shot put
European Throwing Cup
Gold medal – first place	2022 Leiria	Shot put
Bronze medal – third place	2023 Leiria	Shot put

Zane Weir (born 7 September 1995) is an Italian shot putter of South African descent. He has represented Italy since February 2020, and competed for them at the 2020 Summer Olympics. He won the gold medal at the 2023 European Indoor Championships and the silver medal at the 2026 European Championships.

== Biography ==
=== Early and personal life ===
Weir was born and raised in Amanzimtoti, South Africa. He studied at Westville Boys' High School and the University of Cape Town. A South African with Italian heritage, Weir said it was his having listened to his grandfather Mario's sporting tales of his time in Italy, that made him decide to represent Italy after completing his degree in finance and accounting. His grandfather had been a keen sportsman.

He later trained in Italy alongside Leonardo Fabbri with coach Paolo Dal Soglio. Weir became a father in 2026.

== Career ==
=== 2021 ===
He produced a personal best of 21.11 m in February 2021 – 1 cm over the qualifying mark to book his spot for the trip to Japan and the delayed 2020 Tokyo Olympics.

In May 2021, at the Diamond League Meeting in Doha he finished 5th.

In the delayed 2020 Olympic Games held in Tokyo in 2021, he placed 5th overall in the Qualification round on 3 August 2021, after finishing 3rd in group B with a personal best toss of 21.25. Two days later, he placed again 5th in the Olympic final, with a new PB of 21.41.

He produced another new personal best on 5 September 2021, at the Meeting Città di Padova in Italy with a mark of 21.63 m, improving his personal best from Tokyo 2020 by 22 centimeters, improved again in Caorle on 19 September, to bring it to 21.66 m.

He improved his personal record on 13 March 2022 at the 2022 European Throwing Cup, in Leiria with a mark of 21.99 m, winning the competition.

=== 2023: European Indoor champion ===
Weir broke the Italian indoor national record on the way to throwing 22.06 and winning gold at the 2023 European Athletics Indoor Championships in Istanbul, on 3 March 2023.

He was selected for the shot put competition at the 2023 World Athletics Championships in Budapest, where he qualified for the final.

He improved his personal record on 3 September 2023 at the Meeting Città di Padova with a mark of 22.44 m.

=== 2024 ===
In February 2024, he won the Italian indoor national title with a throw of 21.69m. He competed in the shot put at the 2024 Summer Olympics in Paris in August 2024, placing eleventh in the final.

=== 2025 ===
On 4 February 2025, he took an early World lead with a distance of 21.39 metres to win the Czech Indoor Gala in Ostrava. He was runner-up to compatriot Leonardo Fabbri, who took over the world lead, at the Copernicus Cup on 16 February 2025. He was selected for the 2025 European Athletics Indoor Championships in Appeldoorn. He was selected for the 2025 World Athletics Indoor Championships in Nanjing in March 2025, where he placed eighth overall. He was runner-up at the 2025 Diamond League event at the 2025 Golden Gala in Rome on 6 June 2025. He competed at the 2025 World Championships in Tokyo, Japan.

=== 2026 ===
Competing at the 2026 European Championships in Birmingham, England, he won the silver medal behind Leonardo Fabbri in an Italian one-two of the medals on 10 August, with Weir's first round effort of 21.12 metres enough for the silver.

== Achievements ==
Year	Competition	Venue	Position	Event	Measure	Notes
2021	Olympic Games	(Japan) Tokyo	5th	Shot put	21.41 m	PB
2022	World Indoor Championships	(Serbia) Belgrade	6th	Shot put	21.67 m	
2022	European Throwing Cup	(Portugal) Leiria	1st	Shot put	21.99 m	CR PB
2023	European Indoor Championships	(Turkey) Istanbul	1st	Shot put	22.06 m	NR EL
2023	European Throwing Cup	(Portugal) Leiria	3rd	Shot put	20.98 m	

== See also ==
- Italian all-time lists - Shot put
