= Albania at the 2016 European Athletics Championships =

- WA code: ALB
- National federation: AAF
- Website: www.aaf.al

in Amsterdam
- Competitors: 2 (1 man and 1 woman) in 2 events
- Medals Ranked 24th: Gold 0 Silver 1 Bronze 0 Total 1

European Athletics Championships appearances
- 1938; 1946–1962; 1966; 1969–1986; 1990; 1994; 1998; 2002; 2006; 2010; 2012; 2014; 2016; 2018; 2022; 2024

Albania competed at the 2016 European Athletics Championships in Amsterdam, Netherlands, between 6 and 10 July 2016.

== Medals ==
| Medal | Name | Event | Date |
|---|---|---|---|
| Silver | Luiza Gega | Women's 3000 metres steeplechase | 10 July |

== Results ==
Men
Track & road events

| Event | Athletes | Qualification | | Final | |
| Event | Athletes | Result | Rank | Result | Rank |
|---|---|---|---|---|---|
| Long jump | Izmir Smajlaj | 7.92 | 10 q | 7.75 | 9 |

Women
Track & road events

| Event | Athletes | Heats | | Semifinal | | Final | |
| Event | Athletes | Result | Rank | Result | Rank | Result | Rank |
|---|---|---|---|---|---|---|---|
| 3000 m steeplechase | Luiza Gega | 9:38.87 | 1 Q | — | | 9:28.52 NR | 2nd place, silver medalist(s) |
