= Albania at the 2024 European Athletics Championships =

- Flag of Albania
- WA code: ALB

in Rome, Italy 7 June 2024 – 12 June 2022
- Competitors: 2 (1 man and 1 woman)

European Athletics Championships appearances
- 1938; 1946–1962; 1966; 1969–1986; 1990; 1994; 1998; 2002; 2006; 2010; 2012; 2014; 2016; 2018; 2022; 2024

Albania competed at the 2024 European Athletics Championships in Rome, Italy from 7–12 June 2024.

== Medallists ==
Medal	Name	Event	Date

== Results ==
Albania entered the following athletes.

Key

- Q = Qualified for the next round
- q = Qualified for the next round as a fastest loser or, in field events, by position without achieving the qualifying target
- NR = National record
- PB = Personal best
- SB = Season best
- N/A = Round not applicable for the event

=== Men ===
Field events

Athlete	Event	Qualification		Final	
Athlete	Event	Distance	Position	Distance	Position
Izmir Smajlaj	Long jump	7.78 SB	21	Did not advance	

=== Women ===
Track and road events

Athlete	Event	Heat		Semifinal		Final	
Athlete	Event	Result	Rank	Result	Rank	Result	Rank
Luiza Gega	3000 metres steeplechase	9:35.77	8 Q	—		9:22.92 SB	5
