= Albania at the 2022 European Athletics Championships =

- WA code: ALB
- National federation: Albanian Athletics Federation

in Munich 15 August 2022 – 21 August 2022
- Competitors: 1 (1 woman) in 1 event
- Medals Ranked 19th: Gold 1 Silver 0 Bronze 0 Total 1

European Athletics Championships appearances
- 1938; 1946–1962; 1966; 1969–1986; 1990; 1994; 1998; 2002; 2006; 2010; 2012; 2014; 2016; 2018; 2022; 2024

Albania competed at the 2022 European Athletics Championships in Munich from 15 August to 21 August 2022.

== Medallists ==
Medal	Name	Sport	Event	Date
Gold	Luiza Gega	Athletics	Women's 3000 metres steeplechase	20 August

== Results ==
Albania entered the following athletes.

Women
Track and road

Athlete	Event	Heats		Semifinal		Final	
Athlete	Event	Result	Rank	Result	Rank	Result	Rank
Luiza Gega	3000 m steeplechase	9:30.93	1 Q	—		9:11.31 CR	1st place, gold medalist(s)

== See also ==
- Albania at the 2022 European Championships
