= Katrine Koch Jacobsen =

Danish athlete

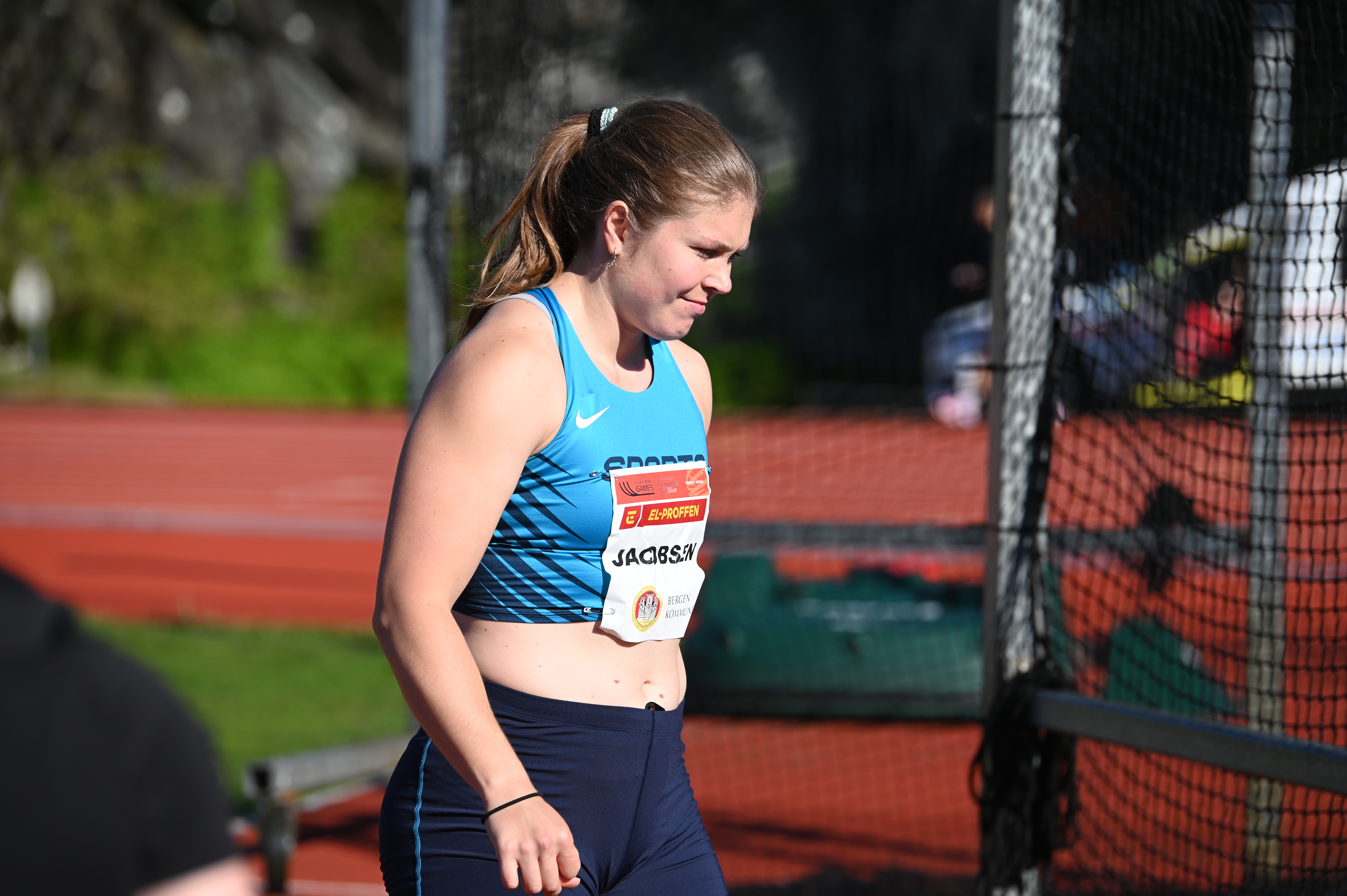
- Katrine Koch Jacobsen in 2026

Personal information
- Nationality: Danish
- Born: 24 June 1999 (age 27)

Sport
- Sport: Athletics
- Event: Hammer throw

Achievements and titles
- Personal bests: Hammer: 75.52m (2026) NR
Medal record
Women's athletics
Representing Denmark
European Throwing Cup
Gold medal – first place	2024 Lieria	Hammer throw
Gold medal – first place	2026 Nicosia	Hammer throw
Bronze medal – third place	2023 Lieria	Hammer throw

Katrine Koch Jacobsen (born 24 June 1999) is a Danish hammer thrower. She holds Denmark's national record in the hammer throw and has competed at multiple major championships, including the 2023 World Athletics Championships, 2024 Olympic Games, and 2026 European Athletics Championships. She won the hammer throw at the 2024 and 2026 European Throwing Cup.

== Biography ==
Jacobsen won her first national title at the Danish Athletics Championships in August 2020, with a throw of 60.97 metres. She set a new Danish national record for the hammer throw in March 2021, recording a distance of 64.68 metres. By September of that year she had extended that record a further eight times, culminating in breaking the 70 metres barrier. She also retained her title at the Danish Athletics Championships in June 2021 in Odense.

In June 2022, she broke the Danish national record for the tenth time in 15 months. That month, she won her third consecutive national title in Aalborg with a throw of 71.06 metres. She competed at the 2022 World Athletics Championships in the women's hammer in Eugene, Oregon, throwing 68.51 metres but nit qualifying for the final. She also competed at the 2022 European Athletics Championships in Munich, Germany where she qualified for the final and placed tenth overall.

Jacobsen won the bronze medal at the 2023 European Throwing Cup with a distance of 71.08 metres in Portugal in March 2023. She retained her national title at the 2023 Danish Athletics Championships in Aalborg in June 2023. She competed at the 2023 World Championships in Budapest, Hungary in the women's hammer throw, qualifying for the final and finishing ninth overall.

Jacobsen won the 2024 European Throwing Cup in Portugal with a best throw of 71.95 metres. She placed fifth overall at the 2024 European Athletics Championships in Rome, Italy, in the hammer throw. She competed at the 2024 Paris Olympics and threw the automatic qualification distance for the final with the fifth longest distance in qualifying. She placed tenth overall in the final.

Jacobsen threw 74.21 metres to finish runner-up at the Kip Keino Classic in Nairobi on 31 May 2025. In September 2025, she placed eighth overall competing in the hammer throw at the 2025 World Championships in Tokyo, Japan.

Jacobsen threw 75.52 metres to win the European Throwing Cup in Nicosia on 14 March 2026. By the end of May, she had thrown over 70 metres on six occasions in competition that year. In August, she competed at the 2026 European Athletics Championships in Birmingham, England, in the hammer throw, qualifying for the final and placing ninth overall.
