= Audrey Jacobs =

Dutch hammer thrower (born 2004)

Personal information
- Born: 21 March 2004 (age 22)

Sport
- Sport: Athletics
- Event: Hammer throw

Achievements and titles
- Personal best: Hammer: 64.94 m (2025)

Audrey Jacobs (born 21 March 2004) is a Dutch track and field athlete. In 2022 and 2023 she won Dutch national championships in the Hammer throw.

== Early life ==
From Veldhoven in the Netherlands, Jacobs studied at Valuascollege in Venlo before studying in the United States at the University of California, Berkeley, where she worked with throws coach Mohamad Saatara.

== Career ==
She won the hammer throw at the 2022 Dutch Athletics Championships in June 2022. In August 2022 Jacobs finished seventh at the 2022 World Athletics U20 Championships in the women's hammer throw event with a distance of 60.83 metres in Cali, Colombia.

She recorded a personal best distance of 64.57 metres in May 2023 in Sacramento, California. She represented her country in the women's hammer at the 2023 European Athletics Team Championships First Division in Silesia, Poland, in June 2023. She recorded a distance of 63.77 metres at the 2023 NCAA final in Texas in June 2023. She retained her Dutch national title in Breda in July 2023. She finished eighth at the 2023 European Athletics U20 Championships in August 2023, in Jerusalem, Israel.

In April 2024, injuries received following an automotor vehicle accident ruled her out of competitive action for the rest of the year. She returned to competing in March 2025 and later that season qualified for the 2025 NCAA Championships with a fifth-place finish and throw of 65.94 metres at the West Regionals. At the NCAA Championships in June, she qualified for the final in Eugene, Oregon, placing eighteenth in the hammer throw. The following month, she was named in the Dutch team for the 2025 European Athletics U23 Championships in Bergen, Norway.
