= Rose Loga =

French athlete (born 2002)

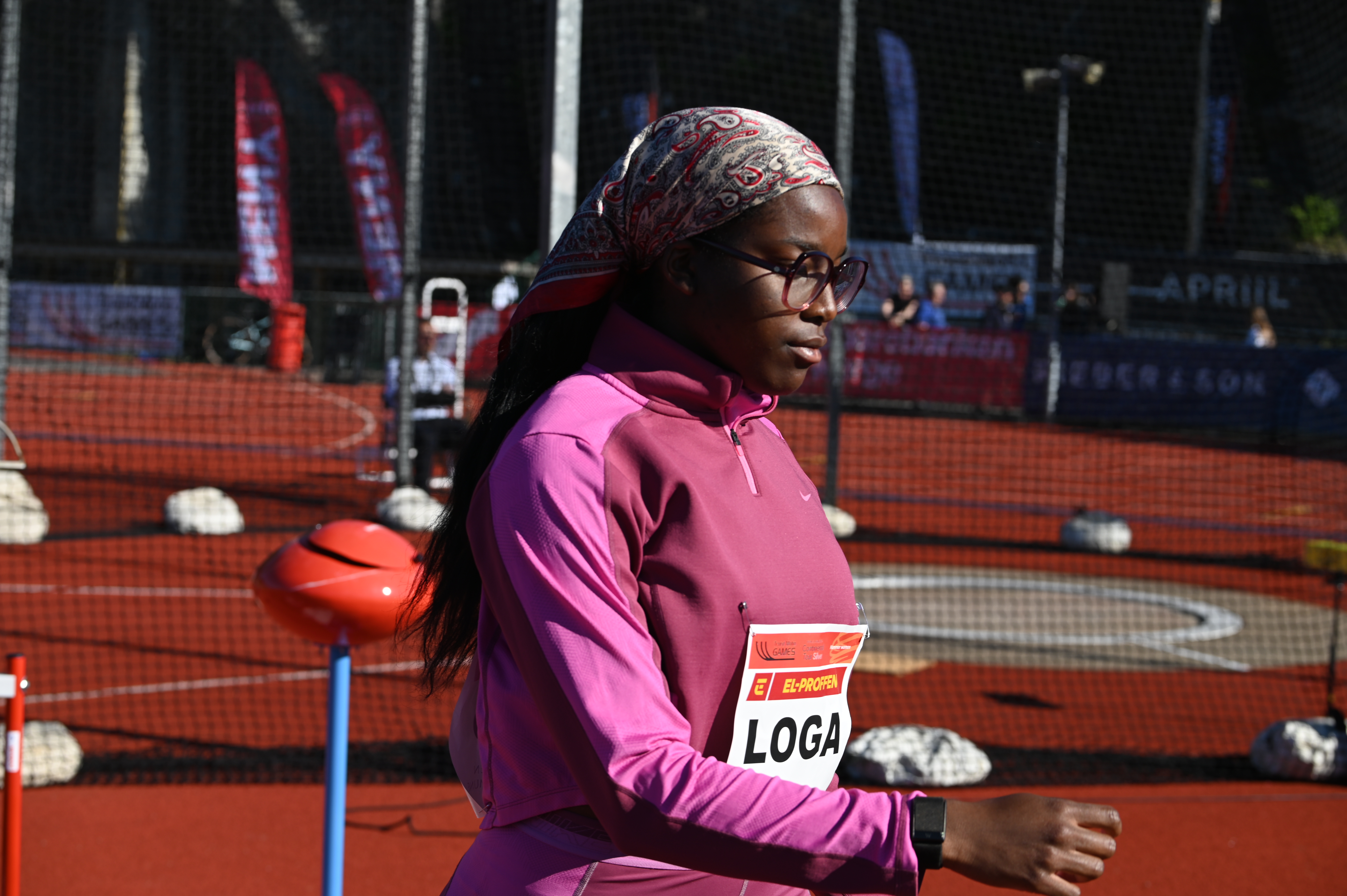
- Loga in 2026

Personal information
- Born: 27 July 2002 (age 24) Paris, France
- Height: 177 cm (5 ft 10 in)
- Weight: 70 kg (154 lb)

Sport
- Country: France
- Sport: Athletics
- Event: Hammer throw

Achievements and titles
- Personal bests: Hammer: 75.19m (Nairobi, 2026)
Medal record
Women's athletics
Representing France
European Championships
Bronze medal – third place	2024 Rome	Hammer throw
European Throwing Cup
Silver medal – second place	2025 Nicosia	Hammer Throw
World U20 Championships
Silver medal – second place	2021 Nairobi	hammer throw
European U20 Championships
Silver medal – second place	2021 Tallinn	hammer throw

Rose Loga (born 27 July 2002) is a French hammer thrower. She won the bronze medal at the 2024 European Athletics Championships and competed at the 2024 Olympic Games.

== Early life ==
She is from Mainvilliers, in the suburbs of Chartres, Eure-et-Loir.

== Career ==
She was a 2021 European Athletics U20 Championships silver medallist in Tallinn, Estonia, in July 2021. She was a 2021 World Athletics U20 Championships silver medallist in Nairobi, Kenya, in August 2021.

Having taken the step-up to the senior level, she won the bronze medal in the hammer throw at the 2022 French Athletics Championships in Caen. She competed at the 2022 European Athletics Championships in Munich, Germany, in August 2022 without proceeding to the final. She competed at the 2023 European Athletics Team Championships First Division in June 2023 in Chorzów, Poland. She was selected for the 2023 World Athletics Championships in Budapest, Hungary, and threw 67.95 metres without reaching the final.

She set a new personal best of 72.01 metres in May 2024. She competed at the 2024 European Athletics Championships in Rome, Italy where she set a new personal best of 72.68 metres and won the bronze medal. She competed in the hammer throw at the 2024 Paris Olympics, throwing 68.94 metres without qualifying for the final.

She won the 2025 French winter throwing championships in February 2025 with a throw of 71.54 metres. In March 2025, she won a silver medal at the European Throwing Cup in Nicosia, Cyprus, having made a best throw of 72.87 metres.

In September 2025, she competed in the hammer throw at the 2025 World Championships in Tokyo, Japan.

In February 2026, Loga improved her personal best to 73.81m to win the women’s hammer at the French Outdoor Throwing Championships. In April, she threw a personal best 75.19 metres at the 2026 Kip Keino Classic. In July, she won the hammer throw at the French Championships in Albi with a throw of 70.98 metres. In August, she competed at the 2026 European Athletics Championships in Birmingham, England, in the hammer throw.
