= Charlotte Payne =

British hammer thrower (born 2002)

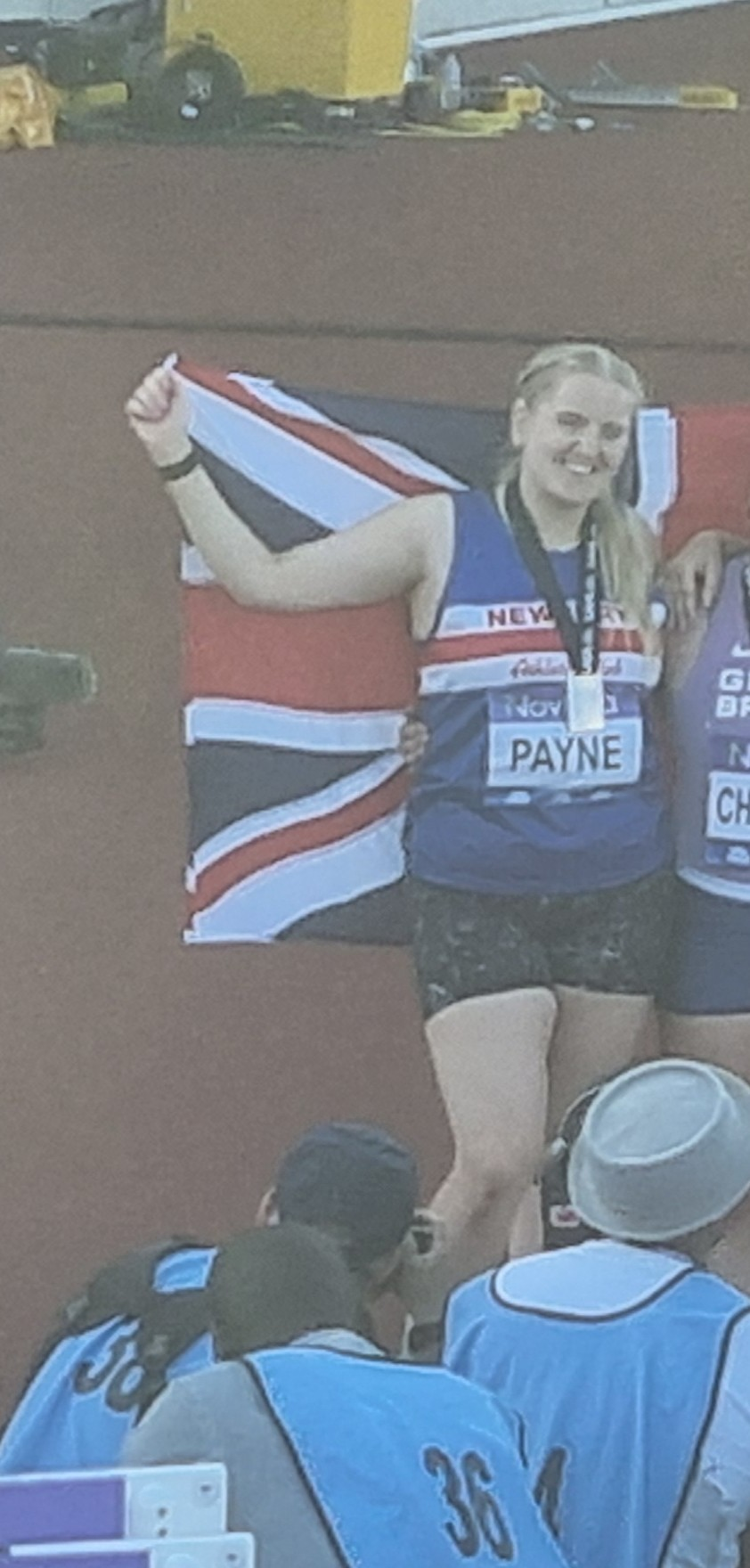
- Charlotte Payne at the 2025 UK Athletics Championships

Personal information
- Born: 20 March 2002 (age 24) Reading, Berkshire, England

Sport
- Sport: Hammer throw
- Club: [Newbury AC]

Achievements and titles
- Regional finals: 2022
- National finals: 2022, 2023
Medal record
British Athletics Championships
Gold medal – first place	2022 Manchester	Hammer throw
Gold medal – first place	2023 Manchester	Hammer throw
Silver medal – second place	2024 Manchester	Hammer throw
Representing Great Britain
European Throwing Cup
Silver medal – second place	2022 Leiria	U23 Hammer throw
European Athletics U23 Championships
Silver medal – second place	2023 Espoo	Hammer throw

Charlotte Payne (born 20 March 2002) is a British hammer thrower, who won the hammer throw events at the 2022 and 2023 British Athletics Championships, and came second in the under-23s events at the 2022 European Throwing Cup and 2023 European Athletics U23 Championships. Payne is deaf, and holds the world record for a deaf woman in the hammer throw.

== Early life ==
Payne was diagnosed as deaf at the age of three, and told that it would impact her balance. Payne started competing in sports at the age of six. After trying sprinting, long jump and shot put, she started competing in the hammer throw in 2013. Her first event was the Berkshire Championships, where she set a championship record. Payne is from Reading, Berkshire, England, and as of 2022, she lived in Cold Ash in Berkshire. Payne lost hearing in her better ear in 2023, and later had cochlear implant surgery.

== Career ==
Payne trains at Reading Athletic Club. She was selected for the 2020 European Throwing Cup, though the event was later cancelled due to the COVID-19 pandemic. At the 2021 European Athletics U20 Championships, Payne finished fourth in the hammer throw event, and was a captain of the British team. In December 2021, she was included in the British Athletics Futures programme. Payne was not selected for the 2022 Commonwealth Games, as Anna Purchase was chosen instead.

Payne came second in the under-23s hammer throw event at the 2022 European Throwing Cup. In 2022, she became the British hammer throw champion after winning the title at the 2022 British Athletics Championships; her throw of 70.59 metres was the third longest ever by a British woman, and made her the youngest British woman ever to throw more than 70 metres (230 ft) in the event. Payne won the event by over 5 metres (16 ft), and beat the world record for a deaf woman by nearly 5 metres (16 ft). Later in the year, she won the hammer throw events at the under-23 and senior England Athletics Championships, and competed at the 2022 European Athletics Championships. In December 2022, she was nominated for the British Deaf Sports Personality of the Year award.

Payne retained her British title at the 2023 British Athletics Championships. At the 2023 European Athletics U23 Championships, she finished second in the hammer throw competition. She came second in the hammer event at the 2024 British Athletics Championships.
