= Rachele Mori =

Italian hammer thrower (born 2003)

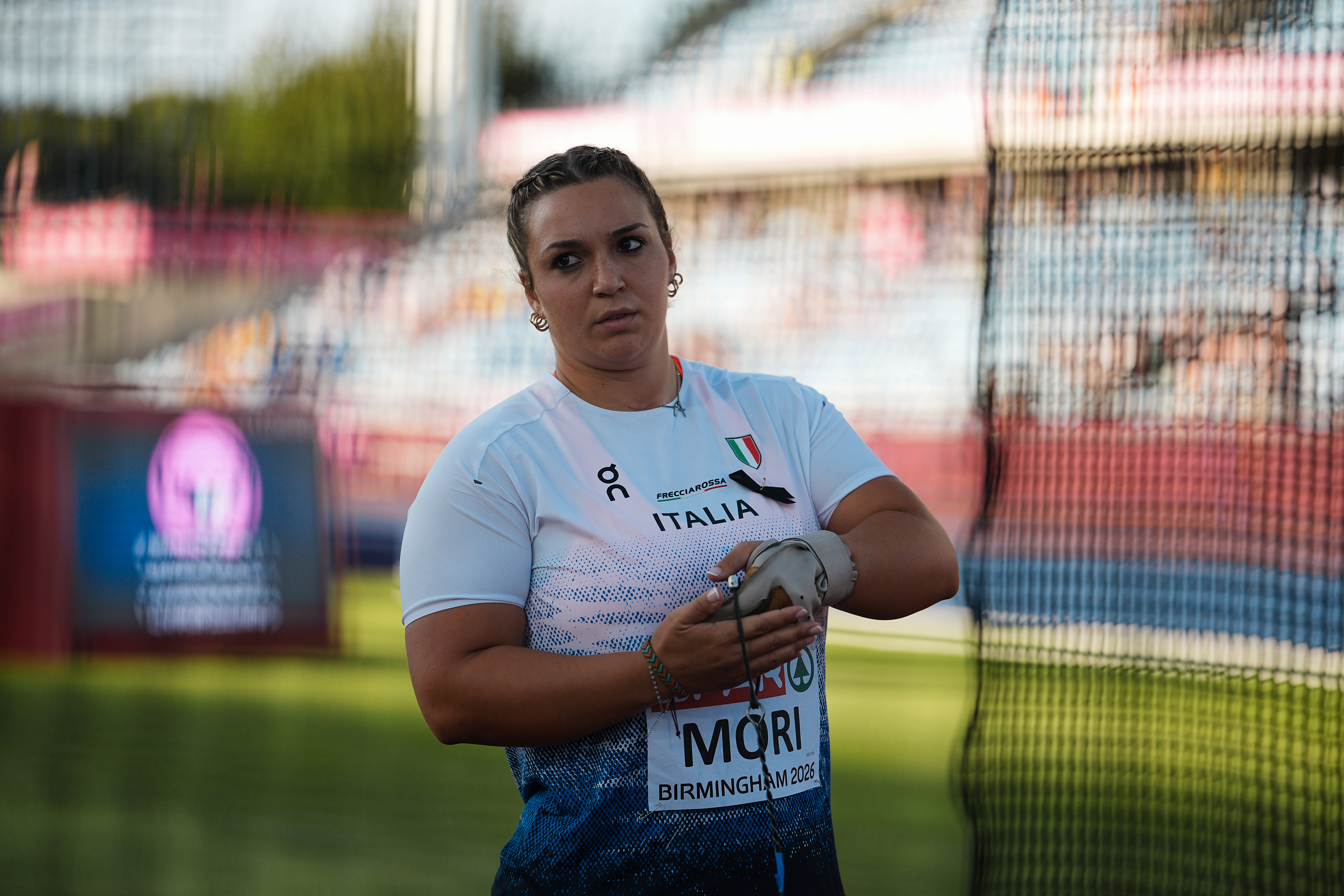

Personal information
- Born: 29 March 2003 (age 23) Cecina, Italy
- Height: 1.70 m (5 ft 7 in)
- Weight: 86 kg (190 lb)

Sport
- Country: Italy
- Sport: Athletics
- Event: Hammer throw
- Club: Fiamme Gialle
- Coached by: Massimo Terreni

Achievements and titles
- Personal best: Hammer throw: 69.04 m (2024)
Medal record
World U20 Championships
Gold medal – first place	2022 Cali	Hammer throw

Rachele Mori (born 29 March 2003) is an Italian hammer thrower who won the gold medal at the 2022 World Athletics U20 Championships.

== Personal life ==
She is the sister of the rugby union player Federico Mori, both nephews of the world champion of 400 m hs in Seville 1999 Fabrizio Mori.

== Career ==
Her personal best of 68.04 m in hammer throw, established in 2022 at the age of 19, in addition to being the new U20 Italian record, also represents the 5th best all-time performance in Italy at open level.

== National records ==
Under 20

- Hammer throw: 68.04 m, ( (Italy) Lucca, 28 May 2022) - Current holder

== Achievements ==
Year	Competition	Venue	Rank	Event	Measure	Notes
2021	World U20 Championships	(Kenya) Nairobi	6th	Hammer throw	61.94 m	
2022	World U20 Championships	(Colombia) Cali	1st	Hammer throw	67.21 m	
2024	European Championships	(Italy) Rome	Qual.	Hammer throw	68.52 m	SB
2026	European Championships	(United Kingdom) Birmingham	Qual.	Hammer throw	60.25 m	

== See also ==
- Italian all-time lists - Hammer throw
