= Thea Löfman =

Swedish hammer thrower

Thea Löfman (born 8 September 2003 ) is a Swedish track and field athlete who competes in the hammer throw. Löfman competed for Sweden in the 2024 Summer Olympics in Paris. In May 2024, she set a Swedish hammer throw record at the Heino Lipp Memorial in Estonia, breaking the previous record set by Ida Storm in 2017. Löfman finished fourth in the hammer throw at the 2025 European Athletics U23 Championships in Bergen.
