= Icelandic Athletic Federation =

Icelandic federation for sports

- Sport: Athletics
- Abbreviation: FRÍ
- Founded: 1947
- Affiliation: World Athletics
- Regional affiliation: EAA and AASSE
- Headquarters: Reykjavík
- President: Freyr Ólafsson
- Secretary: Guðmundur Karlsson

Official website
- www.fri.is
- (Iceland)

The Icelandic Athletic Federation (Icelandic: Frjálsíþróttasamband Íslands) is the governing body for the sport of athletics in Iceland.

== Affiliations ==
- World Athletics
- European Athletic Association (EAA)
- National Olympic and Sports Association of Iceland

== National records ==
FRÍ maintains the Icelandic records in athletics.
