= Valentina Savva =

Cypriot hammer thrower (born 2005)

- Savva at the 2026 Commonwealth Games

Personal information
- Born: 17 May 2005 (age 21)

Sport
- Sport: Athletics
- Event: Hammer throw

Achievements and titles
- Personal bests: Hammer: 70.22 m (2025) NR
Medal record
Women's athletics
Representing Cyprus
European U23 Championships
Bronze medal – third place	2025 Bergen	Hammer throw
World U20 Championships
Silver medal – second place	2024 Lima	Hammer throw
European U20 Championships
Gold medal – first place	2023 Jerusalem	Hammer
European U18 Championships
Gold medal – first place	2022 Jerusalem	Hammer

Valentina Savva (Greek: Βαλεντίνα Σάββα; born 17 May 2005) is a Cypriot hammer thrower. She is the national record holder at the discipline.

== Early life ==
She has a Ukrainian mother and a Cypriot father. She lived in Larnaca, Cyprus, and later attended the University of California, Berkeley, in the United States.

== Career ==
She won a gold medal at the 2022 European Athletics U18 Championships in Jerusalem. She placed fourth at the 2022 World Athletics U20 Championships in Cali, Colombia. Later that year, she was nominated by the European Athletics Association (EAA) Awards in the Women's Rising Star category.

She won a gold medal at the 2023 European Athletics U20 Championships in Jerusalem. She was a silver medalist at the 2023 Games of the Small States in Malta.

In early 2024, she changed coaching set-up from Giorgos Aresti, who she had known from the age of 12 years-old, to national coach Constantinos Stathelakos, however a few days later Stathelakos died in a road traffic accident in South Africa where the team was out for winter training. She worked later that year with Paraskevi Theodorou, Stathelakos’ widow. She was a bronze medalists at the Balkan Athletics Championships in İzmir, Turkey in May 2024. She was a silver medalist at the 2024 World Athletics U20 Championships in Lima, Peru with a throw of 67.21 metres.

She qualified for the 2025 NCAA Championships in the United States with a winning throw of 67.75 metres at the West Regionals finals. At the NCAA Championships in June, she qualified for the final in Eugene, Oregon, placing tenth in the hammer throw with a best effort of 66.84 metres. She threw a new national record in the hammer throw of 69.56m at the 2025 European Athletics Team Championships Second Division in Maribor in June 2025. She was selected to represent Cyprus at the 2025 European Athletics U23 Championships in Bergen, Norway, winning the bronze medal with a national record of 70.22m. In September 2025, she competed in the hammer throw at the 2025 World Championships in Tokyo, Japan.

Competing in May 2026 at the Atlantic Coast Conference Championships in the United States, Savva broke the ACC Championship record in the women’s hammer throw with 69.68 meters. Competing at the 2026 NCAA Division 1 West Outdoor Regionals in Fayetteville, Arkansas in May, Savva won ahead of Anthonett Nabwe in the women's hammer, throwing 69.18m. She placed tenth in the final of the hammer throw at the 2026 Commonwealth Games in Glasgow, Scotland. In August, she competed at the 2026 European Athletics Championships in Birmingham, England, in the hammer throw.
