= Silja Kosonen =

Finnish hammer thrower (born 2002)

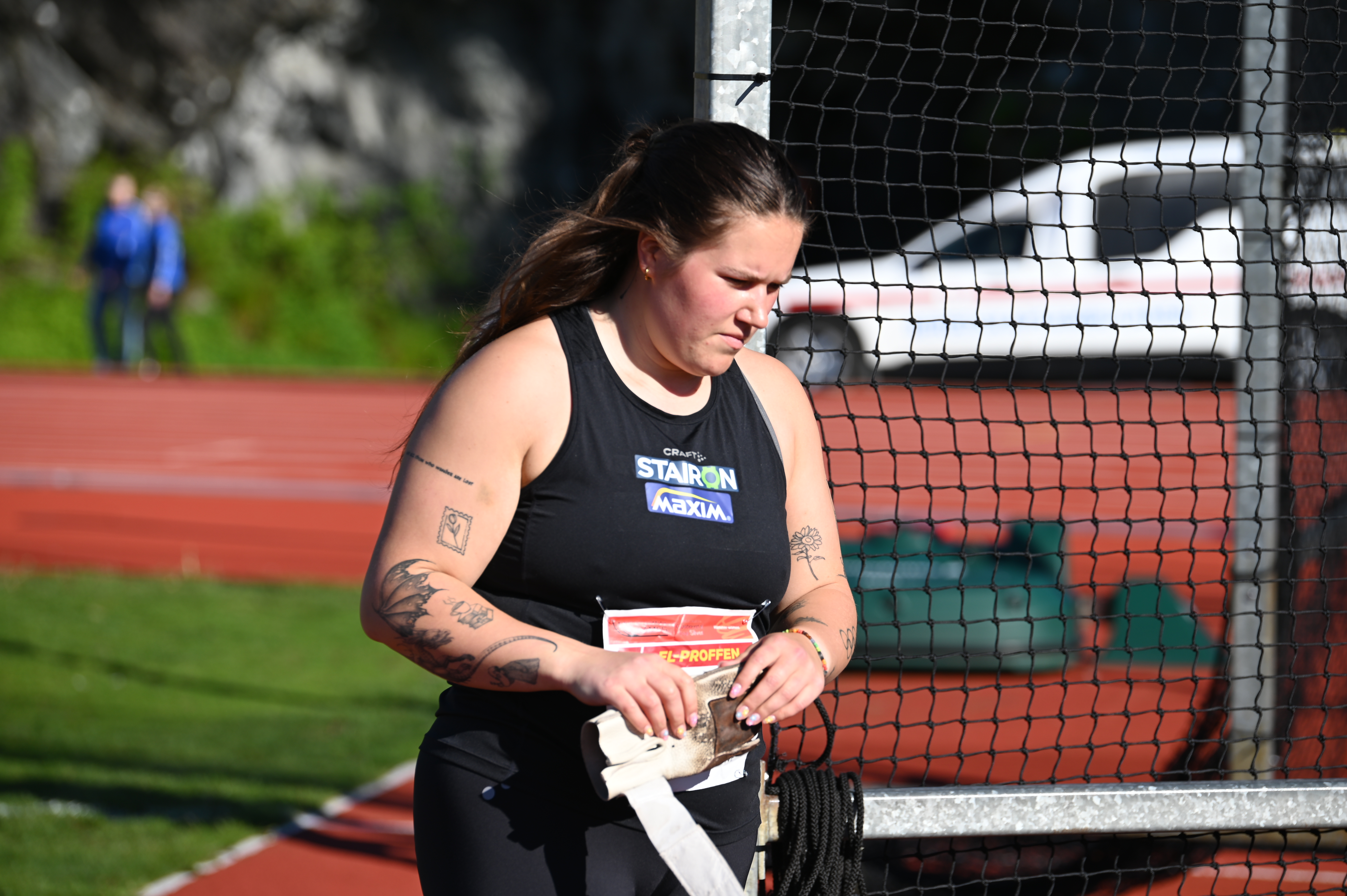
- Silje Kosonen in 2026

Personal information
- Nationality: Finland
- Born: 16 December 2002 (age 23) Raisio, Finland

Sport
- Sport: Athletics
Medal record
European Championships
Gold medal – first place	2026 Birmingham	Hammer throw
European Games
Bronze medal – third place	2023 Kraków-Małopolska	Hammer throw
European Throwing Cup
Gold medal – first place	2025 Nicosia	Hammer Throw
World U20 Championships
Gold medal – first place	2021 Nairobi	hammer throw
European U23 Championships
Gold medal – first place	2023 Espoo	hammer throw
European U20 Championships
Gold medal – first place	2021 Tallinn	hammer throw

Silja Kosonen (born 16 December 2002) is a Finnish hammer thrower. She competed in the 2020 Summer Olympics. She won the hammer throw event at the Birmingham 2026 European Athletics Championships and the World U20 Championship held in Nairobi, Kenya.

== Biography ==
The daughter of Kimmo and Johanna Kosonen, she grew up in Raisio, in the Southwest Finland region. As a child, she participated in several sports, including football, orienteering, and other athletics events. At around the age of eight, she took up the hammer throw after her parents took her to try the event; in one of her first youth competitions, she immediately set a club record. Her family continued to support her athletic career, also helping to create training facilities on the family property.

After attending upper secondary school, she enrolled at the University of Turku, where she studied languages, with German as her main subject and English among her secondary subjects.

Openly gay, in 2026 she made public her relationship with Finnish futsal player Senni Viren, whom she met at the beginning of the year. Viren plays for RaiFu, a team based in Raisio, Kosonen's hometown, and has also been called up to the Finnish national futsal team.

== Career ==
She rose to international prominence already in the junior categories. At the age of 16, she won the gold medal in the hammer throw at the 15th European Youth Summer Olympic Festival in Baku 2019, setting a championship record with a throw of 72.35 m. In 2021, she won the gold medal in the hammer throw at the European U20 Championships in Tallinn, with a throw of 71.06 m. In the same year, she competed at the 2020 Summer Olympics in Tokyo, where she was eliminated in qualifying with a throw of 70.49 m, and at the World U20 Championships in Nairobi, where she won gold with 71.64 m, setting a championship record.

In 2022, she made her debut at the World Championships in Eugene, Oregon, finishing seventh in the hammer throw with 70.81 m after recording 72.15 m in qualifying. At the European Championships in Munich, she finished fifth with 69.45 m.

She won the bronze medal in the hammer throw at the European Games in Chorzów 2023, with a throw of 72.34 m, in an event that also counted towards the European Athletics Team Championships. A few months later, she won the gold medal at the European U23 Championships in Espoo, setting a championship record of 73.71 m. At the World Championships in Budapest, she finished fifth, improving her personal best to 73.89 m.

She finished fourth at the European Championships in Rome with a throw of 72.06 m. At the 2024 Summer Olympics in Paris, she improved her personal best to 74.04 m and finished fifth in the hammer throw.

In 2025, she finished fourth at the World Championships in Tokyo, setting a personal best of 75.28 m.

She won the first senior international title of her career at the 2026 European Championships in Birmingham, where she threw 76.28 m in the final of the hammer throw, finishing ahead of Italy's Sara Fantini and Norway's Beatrice Nedberge Llano.

== Competition record ==
Year	Competition	Venue	Position	Event	Notes
Representing Finland
2019	European Youth Olympic Festival	Baku, Azerbaijan	1st place, gold medalist(s)	Hammer throw	72.35 m
2021	European U20 Championships	Tallinn, Estonia	1st place, gold medalist(s)	Hammer throw	71.06 m
2021	Olympic Games	Tokyo, Japan	14th (q)	Hammer throw	70.49 m
2021	World U20 Championships	Nairobi, Kenya	1st place, gold medalist(s)	Hammer throw	71.64 m
2022	World Championships	Eugene, United States	7th	Hammer throw	70.81 m
2022	European Championships	Munich, Germany	5th	Hammer throw	69.45 m
2023	European U23 Championships	Espoo, Finland	1st	Hammer throw	73.71 m
2023	World Championships	Budapest, Hungary	5th	Hammer throw	73.89 m
2024	European Championships	Rome, Italy	4th	Hammer throw	72.06 m
2024	Olympic Games	Paris, France	5th	Hammer throw	74.04 m
2025	European Team Championships	Madrid, Spain	2nd	Hammer throw	73,09 m
2025	World Championships	Tokyo, Japan	4th	Hammer throw	75.28 m
2026	European Championships	Birmingham, United Kingdom	1st place, gold medalist(s)	Hammer throw	76.28 m
