= Elísabet Rut Rúnarsdóttir =

Icelandic hammer (born 2002)

Personal information
- Born: 28 November 2002 (age 23)

Sport
- Sport: Athletics
- Event: Hammer throw

Achievements and titles
- Personal best: Hammer: 73.19m (2026)

Elísabet Rut Rúnarsdóttir (born 28 November 2002) is an Icelandic hammer thrower. She was the 2024 and 2026 NCAA champion in the United States.

== Biography ==
She set an Icelandic under-17 record of 61.91 metres for the hammer throw, competing in 2018 as a 17-year-old.

In April 2021, she set an Icelandic national hammer throw record of 64.39 metres. She finished seventh in the 2021 European Athletics U20 Championships in Tallinn. She finished fourth at the 2021 World Athletics U20 Championships in Nairobi, with a distance of 63.81 metres.

Competing for Texas State University, she threw 66.98 metres to finish seventh overall in the hammer throw at the 2023 NCAA Outdoor Championships in Austin, Texas in June 2023. She finished in fifth place in the hammer throw at the 2023 European Athletics U23 Championships in Espoo with a distance of 65.93 metres.

She won the hammer throw at the 2024 NCAA Outdoor Championships in Eugene, Oregon. She competed for Iceland at the 2024 European Athletics Championships in Rome, Italy in the women's hammer throw.

In March 2026, Elísabet equalised the Icelandic national hammer throw record of Guðrún Karítas Hallgrímsdóttir by throwing 71.41 metres at the 2026 UTSA Invitational in San Antonio, Texas. On 18 April 2026, with 72.89 metres she threw a new Icelandic record to win the 66th Annual Mt. SAC Relays in Walnut, California, only to lose that Icelandic record once more a few days later when Guðrún Karítas Hallgrímsdóttir placed third on 24 April 2026 at the 2026 Kip Keino Classic with a throw of 73.88 metres. On 11 June, Rúnarsdóttir won the 2026 NCAA Division I Outdoor Track and Field Championships with a personal best 73.19 metres. In August, she competed at the 2026 European Athletics Championships in Birmingham, England, in the hammer throw.
