= Nicola Tuthill =

Irish athlete (born 2003)

Personal information
- Born: 22 December 2003 (age 22)

Sport
- Sport: Athletics
- Event: Hammer throw

Achievements and titles
- Personal bests: Hammer: 72.48m (Nicosia, 2026)
Medal record
Women's athletics
Representing Ireland
European U23 Championships
Silver medal – second place	2025 Bergen	Hammer throw
European Throwing Cup
Silver medal – second place	2026 Nicosia	Hammer throw
Gold medal – first place	2025 Nicosia	U23 Hammer throw
Silver medal – second place	2023 Leiria	U23 Hammer throw
Silver medal – second place	2024 Leiria	U23 Hammer throw
Summer World University Games
Silver medal – second place	2025 Bochum	Hammer throw

Nicola Tuthill (born 22 December 2003) is an Irish hammer thrower. She is a multiple-time national champion and world finalist.

== Early life ==
She is from Kilbrittain, near Bandon, County Cork, where her parents Norman and Collette run a dairy farm. She has an older sister, Olivia and a younger sister, Aoife. Her father built her a throwing cage and circle on their farm in 2019. She studies biological, biomedical and biomolecular science at University College Dublin.

== Career ==
She won her first Irish senior hammer title in 2020 with a best of 60.04m, aged just 16 years-old, a new Irish U18 record. She qualified for the final at the World Athletics U20 Championships in Cali, Colombia, finishing in eighth place.

=== 2023 ===
Competing at her first senior international contortion for Ireland, she finished second in the 2023 European Team Championships in Silesia in Poland, throwing a lifetime best of 67.85m. This placed her second on the Irish senior all-time list behind national record holder Eileen O'Keeffe. She won the Irish under-23 title in Tullamore, County Offaly, setting a championship record 64.89m. She was the 2023 Athletics Ireland University Athlete of the Year.

=== 2024 ===
Competing at the Irish Universities Track and Field Championships in April 2024, Tuthill took victory with a new Irish U23 record throw of 68.65m. She threw a new personal best of 70.32 metres in Banská Bystrica in May 2024. She finished ninth in her first major final at the 2024 European Athletics Championships in Rome, having thrown a distance of 69.85 to rank seventh best qualifier for the final.

In July 2024, she qualified by ranking and competed in the hammer throw at the 2024 Paris Olympics.

=== 2025 ===
In March 2025, she won the gold medal in the U23 hammer throw at the European Throwing Cup in Nicosia. She was selected for the 2025 European Athletics Team Championships Second Division in Maribor in June 2025, finishing third overall with a throw of 70.50 metres. That month, she threw an Irish U-23 record of 71.71m in Finland and the following month backed that up by throwing 70.65 metres in Cork. She won a silver medal at the 2025 European Athletics U23 Championships in Bergen, Norway on 18 July. The following week, she won another silver medal with a throw of 69.98 metres at the 2025 World University Games in Germany. In September 2025, she competed in the hammer throw at the 2025 World Championships in Tokyo, Japan, qualifying for the final and placing eleventh overall.

=== 2026 ===
Tuthill won the silver medal at the 2026 European Throwing Cup in Nicosia, throwing a personal best 72.48 metres. In July, she had a best of 72.35m to finish second to Camryn Rogers at the Cork City Sports in Ireland. She also placed runner-up to Rogers in the same week at the Morton Games in Dublin. On 26 July, Tuthill won her fifth national title in the hammer at the 2026 Irish Championships, with a best throw of 70.16 metres. Tuthill threw 70.33m to finish fifth overall at the 2026 European Athletics Championships in Birmingham, England.
