= Albania at the 2010 European Athletics Championships =

Sporting event delegation

Albania was represented by 2 athletes at the 2010 European Athletics Championships held in Barcelona, Spain.

== Participants ==
=== Men ===
Event	Athletes	Qualification		Final	
Event	Athletes	Result	Rank	Result	Rank
Long jump	Admir Bregu	No mark		Did not advance	

=== Women ===
Event	Athlete	Heat		Semifinal		Final	
Event	Athlete	Result	Rank	Result	Rank	Result	Rank
200 m	Klodiana Shala	Did not start		Did not advance			

== Results ==
2010 Barcelona	Gold	Silver	Bronze	Total
Albania (ALB)	0	0	0	0
