= Iceland at the 2012 European Athletics Championships =

Iceland competed at the 2012 European Athletics Championships held in Helsinki, Finland, from 27 June to 1 July 2012.

== Results ==
=== Men ===
==== Track ====
| Event | Athletes | Heats | | Semifinal | | Final | |
| Event | Athletes | Result | Rank | Result | Rank | Result | Rank |
|---|---|---|---|---|---|---|---|
| 400 m | Trausti Stefánsson | 48.17 | 28 | DNQ | | | |

==== Field ====
| Event | Athletes | Qualification | | Final | |
| Event | Athletes | Result | Rank | Result | Rank |
|---|---|---|---|---|---|
| Long jump | Kristinn Torfason | 7.49 | 28 | DNQ | |
| Shot put | Ódinn Björn Thorsteinsson | 18.19 | 22 | DNQ | |

==== Combined ====
| Decathlon | Event | Einar Daði Lárusson | | |
| Decathlon | Event | Results | Points | Rank |
|---|---|---|---|---|
| | 100 m | 11.11 | 836 | 15 |
| | Long jump | 7.33 | 893 | 5 |
| | Shot put | 13.65 | 707 | 14 |
| | High jump | 2.00 | 803 | 3 |
| | 400 m | 49.07 | 858 | 10 |
| | 110 m hurdles | 14.72 | 884 | 12 |
| | Discus | 35.95 | 583 | 21 |
| | Pole vault | 4.60 | 790 | 14 |
| | Javelin | 51.75 | 615 | 16 |
| | 1500 m | 4:39.38 | 684 | 13 |
| Final | | | 7653 | 13 |

=== Women ===
==== Field ====
| Event | Athletes | Qualification | | Final | |
| Event | Athletes | Result | Rank | Result | Rank |
|---|---|---|---|---|---|
| Javelin throw | Ásdís Hjálmsdóttir | 55.29 | 13 | DNQ | |

== Sources ==
- "European Athletics - Event Website". sportresult.com. Archived from the original on 2012-07-06.
