= Athletics at the 2016 Summer Olympics – Women's hammer throw =

Women's hammer throw at the Games of the XXXI Olympiad
- Venue: Olympic Stadium
- Date: 12–15 August 2016
- Competitors: 32 from 19 nations
- Winning distance: 82.29 m WR

Medalists
1st place, gold medalist(s)		Anita Włodarczyk	Poland
2nd place, silver medalist(s)		Zhang Wenxiu	China
3rd place, bronze medalist(s)		Sophie Hitchon	Great Britain

Official Video Highlights

The women's hammer throw competition at the 2016 Summer Olympics in Rio de Janeiro, Brazil. The event was held at the Olympic Stadium on 12–15 August. Each athlete received three throws in the qualifying round. All who achieved the qualifying distance progressed to the final. Each finalist was allowed three throws in last round, with the top eight athletes after that point being given three further attempts.

The winning margin was a huge 5.54 metres which with the conclusion of the 2024 Paris Olympics remains the only time the women's hammer has been won by more than two metres at the Olympics.

== Summary ==
Anita Włodarczyk, the reigning World Champion and European Champion, was one of the stand-out gold medal favourites in the Olympic athletics programme, given that she held all ten of the best throws that year and a season's best of 80.26 m – the third best ever. The next best thrower that season was almost five metres behind on the rankings: Betty Heidler was the European runner-up. China's Zhang Wenxiu and Wang Zheng were the next highest ranked.

Włodarczyk continued her unbeaten streak since 2014 to top qualifying in 76.93 m. Zhang was second best in the round and Rosa Rodríguez of Venezuela was a surprise third automatic qualifier. The top-ranked athletes progressed, though non threw beyond 72 metres. Hanna Skydan of Azerbaijan and American Gwen Berry were the most significant of the eliminated athletes.

In the final, Włodarczyk assumed the lead with her first throw of 76.35 m, ahead of Zhang's 75.06 m and Heidler holding bronze position with 71.38 m. The second round saw Sophie Hitchon move into bronze position with a 73.29 m. On the next throw, Włodarczyk improved her position with an 80.40 m, that nobody would match. In the third round Zhang improved and so did Włodarczyk in a big way. Her third throw was 82.29 m (269 ft 11 in) a new world record. Her mark improved upon her own previous world record by 1.21 m and was 2.87 m (over 9 feet) further than any other woman (Heidler) has ever thrown. It was Włodarczyk's sixth world record and the fourth in succession since August 2014. In the fourth round Zalina Marghieva moved into bronze position with her best throw of 73.50 m. The fifth round saw Heidler edge back into bronze position with a 73.71 m, then Zhang solidified her silver position with her best throw of 76.75 m and Włodarczyk threw 81.74 m, only the second best throw in history to her third round throw. On her final throw, Hitchon leapfrogged back into the bronze medal with a 74.54 m British National Record.

The medals were presented by Irena Szewińska, IOC member, Poland and Svein Arne Hansen, Council Member of the IAAF.

Two weeks after the Olympics, Włodarczyk improved the world record again out to 82.98 m (272 ft 2 in).

== Schedule ==
All times are Brasília Time (UTC−3).

Date	Time	Round
Friday, 12 August 2016	20:40	Qualifications
Monday, 15 August 2016	10:40	Finals

== Records ==
Prior to the competition, the existing World and Olympic records were as follows.

World record	Anita Wlodarczyk (POL)	81.08 m	Władysławowo, Poland	1 August 2015
Olympic record	Anita Wlodarczyk (POL)	77.60 m	London, United Kingdom	11 August 2012
2016 World leading	Anita Wlodarczyk (POL)	80.26 m	Cetniewo, Poland	12 July 2016

The following records were established during the competition:

Date	Event	Name	Nationality	Distance	Record
16 August	Final	Anita Włodarczyk	Poland	80.40 m	OR
16 August	Final	Anita Włodarczyk	Poland	82.29 m	WR

The following national records were established during the competition:

Country	Athlete	Round	Distance	Notes
Poland	Anita Włodarczyk (POL)	Final	82.29 m	WR, OR, AR
Great Britain	Sophie Hitchon (GBR)	Final	74.54 m	

== Results ==
=== Qualification ===
Qualification rule: qualification standard 72.00 m (Q) or at least best 12 qualified (q).

Rank	Group	Name	Nationality	#1	#2	#3	Result	Notes
1	A	Anita Włodarczyk	Poland	76.93			76.93	Q
2	B	Zhang Wenxiu	China	x	70.72	73.58	73.58	Q
3	A	Rosa Rodriguez	Venezuela	x	69.34	72.41	72.41	Q, SB
4	B	Joanna Fiodorow	Poland	71.77	71.59	69.29	71.77	q
5	A	Zalina Marghieva	Moldova	68.80	71.72	70.90	71.72	q
6	B	Betty Heidler	Germany	71.17	66.62	68.60	71.17	q
7	B	Hanna Malyshchyk	Belarus	x	64.69	71.12	71.12	q
8	B	Amber Campbell	United States	71.09	x	x	71.09	q
9	A	DeAnna Price	United States	69.25	69.52	70.79	70.79	q
10	A	Wang Zheng	China	68.91	70.60	x	70.60	q
11	B	Sophie Hitchon	Great Britain	x	70.37	68.68	70.37	q
12	A	Alexandra Tavernier	France	x	68.42	70.30	70.30	q
13	B	Hanna Skydan	Azerbaijan	67.05	68.98	70.09	70.09	
14	A	Gwen Berry	United States	68.07	x	69.90	69.90	
15	B	Malwina Kopron	Poland	69.31	69.69	x	69.69	
16	A	Liu Tingting	China	67.40	69.14	63.35	69.14	
17	A	Katerina Safrankova	Czech Republic	66.52	68.33	65.30	68.33	
18	B	Kathrin Klaas	Germany	67.92	64.89	67.01	67.92	
19	A	Martina Hrasnova	Slovakia	67.63	66.10	64.32	67.63	
20	A	Alena Sobaleva	Belarus	x	66.71	67.06	67.06	
21	B	Tuğçe Şahutoğlu	Turkey	65.47	67.05	61.92	67.05	
22	A	Iryna Novozhylova	Ukraine	66.70	x	65.15	66.70	
23	A	Heather Steacy	Canada	66.01	x	63.78	66.01	
24	B	Marina Marghieva-Nikisenko	Moldova	65.19	63.82	65.10	65.19	
25	B	Amy Sene	Senegal	64.83	x	60.91	64.83	
26	A	Kıvılcım Kaya Salman	Turkey	x	x	64.79	64.79	
27	B	Jennifer Dahlgren	Argentina	63.03	x	x	63.03	
28	B	Iryna Klymets	Ukraine	62.00	x	62.75	62.75	
29	A	Charlene Woitha	Germany	x	x	62.50	62.50	
30	A	Daina Levy	Jamaica	x	60.35	x	60.35	
31	B	Nataliya Zolotukhina	Ukraine	56.60	x	56.96	56.96	
32	B	Yirisleydi Ford	Cuba	10.91	x	x	10.91	

=== Final ===
Rank	Athlete	Nationality	#1	#2	#3	#4	#5	#6	Result	Notes
1st place, gold medalist(s)	Anita Włodarczyk	Poland	76.35	80.40	82.29	x	81.74	79.60	82.29	WR
2nd place, silver medalist(s)	Zhang Wenxiu	China	75.06	74.04	76.19	74.65	76.75	70.93	76.75	SB
3rd place, bronze medalist(s)	Sophie Hitchon	Great Britain	x	73.29	71.73	72.28	72.89	74.54	74.54	NR
4	Betty Heidler	Germany	71.38	69.24	69.84	72.71	73.71	x	73.71	
5	Zalina Marghieva	Moldova	69.01	x	72.38	73.50	72.96	70.24	73.50	
6	Amber Campbell	United States	68.18	68.85	70.20	70.57	72.74	71.09	72.74	
7	Hanna Malyshchyk	Belarus	66.58	x	70.38	70.60	69.68	71.90	71.90	
8	DeAnna Price	United States	68.12	x	70.95	x	61.95	69.18	70.95	
9	Joanna Fiodorow	Poland	69.87	x	68.63	did not advance			69.87	
10	Rosa Rodríguez	Venezuela	67.94	66.87	69.26	did not advance			69.26	
11	Alexandra Tavernier	France	x	65.18	x	did not advance			65.18	
–	Wang Zheng	China	x	x	x	did not advance			NM	
