= 2006 World Junior Championships in Athletics – Women's hammer throw =

The women's hammer throw event at the 2006 World Junior Championships in Athletics was held in Beijing, China, at Chaoyang Sports Centre on 15 and 16 August.

== Medalists ==
| Gold | Bianca Perie; Romania |
| Silver | Anna Bulgakova; Russia |
| Bronze | Hao Shuai; China |

== Results ==
=== Final ===
16 August

| Rank | Name | Nationality | Attempts | | | | | | Result | Notes |
| Rank | Name | Nationality | 1 | 2 | 3 | 4 | 5 | 6 | Result | Notes |
|---|---|---|---|---|---|---|---|---|---|---|
| 1st place, gold medalist(s) | Bianca Perie | Romania | 62.80 | 67.38 | x | x | 65.45 | 63.76 | 67.38 | |
| 2nd place, silver medalist(s) | Anna Bulgakova | Russia | x | 60.29 | 65.73 | x | x | 65.23 | 65.73 | |
| 3rd place, bronze medalist(s) | Hao Shuai | China | 61.39 | 63.02 | 60.68 | 60.34 | 60.27 | 64.26 | 64.26 | |
| 4 | Zalina Marghieva | Moldova | x | x | 61.60 | 63.24 | x | 62.65 | 63.24 | |
| 5 | Alicja Filipkowska | Poland | x | 62.67 | x | x | 61.31 | x | 62.67 | |
| 6 | Natallia Shayunova | Belarus | 58.09 | 60.12 | 60.19 | x | 59.32 | 61.43 | 61.43 | |
| 7 | Karolina Pedersen | Sweden | 60.19 | x | x | x | x | x | 60.19 | |
| 8 | Annika Nurminen | Finland | 56.95 | 57.10 | 59.81 | 58.42 | x | 57.74 | 59.81 | |
| 9 | Wang Zheng | China | 59.12 | x | x | | | | 59.12 | |
| 10 | Anna Ksenofontova | Russia | x | x | 58.73 | | | | 58.73 | |
| 11 | Kateřina Šafránková | Czech Republic | 57.60 | x | 56.51 | | | | 57.60 | |
| 12 | Alena Krechyk | Belarus | x | x | 54.48 | | | | 54.48 | |

=== Qualifications ===
15 August

==== Group A ====
| Rank | Name | Nationality | Attempts | | | Result | Notes |
| Rank | Name | Nationality | 1 | 2 | 3 | Result | Notes |
|---|---|---|---|---|---|---|---|
| 1 | Anna Bulgakova | Russia | x | 60.49 | - | 60.49 | Q |
| 2 | Zalina Marghieva | Moldova | 59.71 | - | - | 59.71 | Q |
| 3 | Wang Zheng | China | x | x | 59.28 | 59.28 | Q |
| 4 | Karolina Pedersen | Sweden | x | x | 58.67 | 58.67 | Q |
| 5 | Annika Nurminen | Finland | x | 58.41 | 54.59 | 58.41 | q |
| 6 | Alena Krechyk | Belarus | 57.07 | 57.31 | 55.56 | 57.31 | q |
| 7 | Sarah Bensaad | France | 56.91 | x | x | 56.91 | |
| 8 | Sarah Holt | United Kingdom | 54.78 | 52.21 | x | 54.78 | |
| 9 | Tiffany Newton | Germany | 49.86 | 50.50 | 54.08 | 54.08 | |
| 10 | Lucija Kriznik | Slovenia | 53.00 | 53.31 | 49.18 | 53.31 | |
| 11 | Josipa Gasparovic | Croatia | 52.03 | 48.28 | 46.99 | 52.03 | |
| 12 | Andriana Papadopoúlou-Fatala | Greece | 51.42 | x | x | 51.42 | |
| 13 | Aysegül Alniacik | Turkey | 47.63 | x | x | 47.63 | |

==== Group B ====
| Rank | Name | Nationality | Attempts | | | Result | Notes |
| Rank | Name | Nationality | 1 | 2 | 3 | Result | Notes |
|---|---|---|---|---|---|---|---|
| 1 | Bianca Perie | Romania | 63.16 | - | - | 63.16 | Q |
| 2 | Hao Shuai | China | 56.94 | 60.79 | - | 60.79 | Q |
| 3 | Alicja Filipkowska | Poland | 55.47 | 60.73 | - | 60.73 | Q |
| 4 | Natallia Shayunova | Belarus | x | x | 60.44 | 60.44 | Q |
| 5 | Anna Ksenofontova | Russia | 59.38 | - | - | 59.38 | Q |
| 6 | Kateřina Šafránková | Czech Republic | 55.07 | 55.46 | 57.70 | 57.70 | q |
| 7 | Nikola Lomnicka | Slovakia | 55.87 | 56.91 | x | 56.91 | |
| 8 | Tuğçe Şahutoğlu | Turkey | 51.49 | 52.25 | 56.85 | 56.85 | |
| 9 | Marynna Dias | Brazil | 54.59 | x | 55.32 | 55.32 | |
| 10 | Kristin Steinert | Germany | 54.08 | 52.19 | x | 54.08 | |
| 11 | Dóra Lévai | Hungary | 52.31 | 53.19 | x | 53.19 | |
| 12 | Annabelle Rolnin | France | x | 51.27 | 49.32 | 51.27 | |

== Participation ==
According to an unofficial count, 25 athletes from 19 countries participated in the event.

- Belarus (2)
- Brazil (1)
- China (2)
- Croatia (1)
- Czech Republic (1)
- Finland (1)
- France (2)
- Germany (2)
- Greece (1)
- Hungary (1)
- Moldova (1)
- Poland (1)
- Romania (1)
- Russia (2)
- Slovakia (1)
- Slovenia (1)
- Sweden (1)
- Turkey (2)
- United Kingdom (1)
