= 2012 European Athletics Championships – Women's hammer throw =

Women's hammer throw at the European Athletics Championships

The women's hammer throw at the 2012 European Athletics Championships was held at the Helsinki Olympic Stadium on 29 June and 1 July.

== Medalists ==
Gold	Anita Włodarczyk; Poland
Silver	Martina Hrašnová; Slovakia
Bronze	Anna Bulgakova; Russia

== Records ==
Standing records prior to the 2012 European Athletics Championships
World record	Betty Heidler (GER)	79.42	Halle, Germany	21 May 2011
European record	Betty Heidler (GER)	79.42	Halle, Germany	21 May 2011
Championship record	Tatyana Lysenko (RUS)	76.67	Gothenburg, Sweden	8 August 2006
World Leading	Aksana Miankova (BLR)	78.19	Brest, Belarus	28 April 2012
World Leading	Aksana Miankova (BLR)	78.19	Minsk, Belarus	12 June 2012
European Leading	Aksana Miankova (BLR)	78.19	Brest, Belarus	28 April 2012
European Leading	Aksana Miankova (BLR)	78.19	Minsk, Belarus	12 June 2012

== Schedule ==
Date	Time	Round
29 June 2012	11:35	Qualification
1 July 2012	16:00	Final

== Results ==
=== Qualification ===
Qualification: Qualification Performance 71.00 (Q) or at least 12 best performers advance to the final

Rank	Group	Athlete	Nationality	#1	#2	#3	Result	Notes
1	B	Anita Włodarczyk	Poland	66.30	69.50	71.38	71.38	Q
DQ	A	Zalina Marghieva	Moldova	~~68.47~~	~~67.34~~	~~69.86~~	~~69.86~~	q, Doping
2	B	Martina Hrašnová	Slovakia	67.76	69.67	x	69.67	q
3	B	Kathrin Klaas	Germany	66.12	68.95	68.56	68.95	q
4	A	Berta Castells	Spain	68.11	67.26	68.52	68.52	q, SB
5	B	Anna Bulgakova	Russia	68.44	x	–	68.44	q
6	A	Stéphanie Falzon	France	x	68.42	x	68.42	q
7	A	Éva Orbán	Hungary	67.72	x	67.89	67.89	q
8	A	Tuğçe Şahutoğlu	Turkey	x	66.24	67.47	67.47	q
9	B	Bianca Perie	Romania	67.14	63.98	67.46	67.46	q
10	B	Sophie Hitchon	Great Britain	x	61.65	67.08	67.08	q
11	B	Tereza Králová	Czech Republic	66.89	66.09	x	66.89	q
12	A	Tracey Andersson	Sweden	63.40	x	66.65	66.65	
13	A	Kateřina Šafránková	Czech Republic	66.51	64.15	x	66.51	
14	B	Marina Marghiev	Moldova	65.44	x	65.11	65.44	
15	A	Barbara Špiler	Slovenia	63.71	x	65.37	65.37	
16	A	Betty Heidler	Germany	x	x	65.06	65.06	
17	A	Mona Holm Solberg	Norway	60.37	64.03	62.84	64.03	
18	B	Merja Korpela	Finland	64.03	63.83	61.14	64.03	
19	A	Vânia Silva	Portugal	61.53	62.81	61.04	62.81	
20	B	Alina Kastrova	Belarus	62.51	x	x	62.51	
21	A	Sarah Holt	Great Britain	61.06	59.12	61.18	61.18	
	B	Silvia Salis	Italy	x	x	x	NM	
	B	Laura Redondo	Spain	x	x	x	NM	

=== Final ===
Rank	Athlete	Nationality	#1	#2	#3	#4	#5	#6	Result	Notes
1st place, gold medalist(s)	Anita Włodarczyk	Poland	74.02	73.17	73.29	74.29	73.93	x	74.29	
2nd place, silver medalist(s)	Martina Hrašnová	Slovakia	70.57	73.34	x	68.38	x	x	73.34	SB
3rd place, bronze medalist(s)	Anna Bulgakova	Russia	70.84	x	71.47	70.80	67.70	x	71.47	
4	Kathrin Klaas	Germany	66.53	70.44	67.03	66.82	70.34	69.75	70.44	
5	Tuğçe Şahutoğlu	Turkey	68.12	70.21	68.23	67.63	x	66.05	70.21	
6	Stéphanie Falzon	France	63.05	67.80	68.03	66.59	67.02	x	68.03	
7	Éva Orbán	Hungary	66.81	x	67.92	x	x	66.83	67.92	
DQ	Zalina Marghieva	Moldova	~~67.92~~	~~x~~	~~x~~	~~x~~	~~x~~	~~65.53~~	~~67.92~~	Doping
8	Berta Castells	Spain	66.03	67.42	x				67.42	
9	Bianca Perie	Romania	66.92	x	67.24				67.24	
10	Sophie Hitchon	Great Britain	66.73	67.17	x				67.17	
11	Tereza Králová	Czech Republic	x	65.29	65.87				65.87	
