= Track and field at the 2015 Military World Games – Women's hammer throw =

The women's hammer throw event at the 2015 Military World Games was held on 7 October at the KAFAC Sports Complex.

== Records ==
Prior to this competition, the existing world and CISM record were as follows:

World Record	Anita Włodarczyk (POL)	81.08	Władysławowo, Poland	1 August 2015
CISM World Record	Zhang Wenxiu (CHN)	74.29	Rio de Janeiro, Brazil	22 July 2011

== Schedule ==
Date	Time	Round
7 October 2015	15:00	Final

== Medalists ==
Gold	Silver	Bronze
Wenxiu Zhang; China	Anna Bulgakova; Russia	Rosa Rodríguez; Venezuela

== Results ==
=== Final ===
Rank	Athlete	Nationality	#1	#2	#3	#4	#5	#6	Result	Notes
1st place, gold medalist(s)	Wenxiu Zhang	China	70.35	71.21	x	74.87	x	74.68	74.87	CR
2nd place, silver medalist(s)	Anna Bulgakova	Russia	x	x	62.56	64.98	x	68.01	68.01	
3rd place, bronze medalist(s)	Rosa Rodríguez	Venezuela	64.54	66.87	67.54	x	x	x	67.54	
4	Iryna Novozhylova	Ukraine	64.25	66.82	62.00	64.18	65.53	63.95	66.82	
5	Ni Yan	China	63.29	64.84	65.50	65.30	x	66.25	66.25	
6	Carolin Paesler	Germany	x	61.47	x	64.83	64.56	64.77	64.83	
7	Charlene Woitha	Germany	60.96	61.35	x	x	x	x	61.35	
	Ahymara Espinoza	Venezuela							DNS	
