= 2009 European Athletics U23 Championships – Women's hammer throw =

The women's hammer throw event at the 2009 European Athletics U23 Championships was held in Kaunas, Lithuania, at S. Dariaus ir S. Girėno stadionas (Darius and Girėnas Stadium) on 18 July.

== Medalists ==
Gold	Zalina Marghieva; Moldova
Silver	Kateřina Šafránková; Czech Republic
Bronze	Sarah Holt; United Kingdom

== Results ==
=== Final ===
18 July

Rank	Name	Nationality	Attempts						Result	Notes
Rank	Name	Nationality	1	2	3	4	5	6	Result	Notes
1st place, gold medalist(s)	Zalina Marghieva	Moldova	66.20	x	x	65.37	65.74	67.67	67.67	
2nd place, silver medalist(s)	Kateřina Šafránková	Czech Republic	59.16	x	61.05	60.88	63.01	61.11	63.01	
3rd place, bronze medalist(s)	Sarah Holt	United Kingdom	x	x	60.30	x	62.55	57.67	62.55	
4	Joanna Fiodorow	Poland	62.49	x	59.66	x	60.18	61.13	62.49	
5	Nikola Lomnická	Slovakia	56.37	60.04	57.70	61.49	59.79	55.10	61.49	
6	Annabelle Rolnin	France	59.49	x	58.40	x	59.79	56.92	59.79	
7	Natallia Shayunova	Belarus	x	58.57	x	x	59.05	x	59.05	
8	Dorotea Habazin	Croatia	55.30	58.17	x	x	55.98	x	58.17	
9	Laura Redondo	Spain	58.14	x	x				58.14	
10	Sarah Bensaad	France	56.19	54.46	58.13				58.13	
11	Karolina Pedersen	Sweden	x	57.49	56.95				57.49	
12	Dóra Lévai	Hungary	57.15	57.29	56.84				57.29	
13	Vaida Kelečiūtė	Lithuania	47.95	49.50	48.39				49.50	
	Alena Krechyk	Belarus	x	x	x				NM	

== Participation ==
According to an unofficial count, 14 athletes from 12 countries participated in the event.

- Belarus (2)
- Croatia (1)
- Czech Republic (1)
- France (2)
- Hungary (1)
- Lithuania (1)
- Moldova (1)
- Poland (1)
- Slovakia (1)
- Spain (1)
- Sweden (1)
- United Kingdom (1)
