= 2014 European Athletics Championships – Women's hammer throw =

Women's hammer throw at the European Athletics Championships

The women's hammer throw at the 2014 European Athletics Championships took place at the Letzigrund on 13 and 15 August.

== Medalists ==
Gold	Anita Włodarczyk; Poland
Silver	Martina Hrašnová; Slovakia
Bronze	Joanna Fiodorow; Poland

== Records ==
Standing records prior to the 2014 European Athletics Championships
World record	Betty Heidler (GER)	79.42 m	Halle, Germany	21 May 2011
European record	Betty Heidler (GER)	79.42 m	Halle, Germany	21 May 2011
Championship record	Tatyana Lysenko (RUS)	76.67 m	Gothenburg, Sweden	8 August 2006
World Leading	Anita Włodarczyk (POL)	78.17 m	Cetniewo, Poland	26 July 2014
European Leading	Anita Włodarczyk (POL)	78.17 m	Cetniewo, Poland	26 July 2014

== Schedule ==
Date	Time	Round
13 August 2014	13:15	Qualification
15 August 2014	20:40	Final

All times are local times (UTC+2)

== Results ==
=== Qualification ===
69.50 (Q) or at least 12 best performers (q) advanced to the Final.

Rank	Group	Name	Nationality	#1	#2	#3	Result	Note
1	B	Anita Włodarczyk	Poland	75.73			75.73	Q
2	A	Martina Hrašnová	Slovakia	73.05			73.05	Q
3	A	Joanna Fiodorow	Poland	71.33			71.33	Q
4	A	Alexandra Tavernier	France	70.91			70.91	Q, PB
5	B	Anna Bulgakova	Russia	65.91	x	70.58	70.58	Q
6	A	Betty Heidler	Germany	70.49			70.49	Q
7	B	Éva Orbán	Hungary	x	x	70.48	70.48	Q
8	B	Kathrin Klaas	Germany	69.78			69.78	Q
9	B	Carolin Paesler	Germany	68.47	67.95	67.88	68.47	q
10	A	Bianca Perie	Romania	67.82	67.42	x	67.82	q
11	B	Kateřina Šafránková	Czech Republic	x	67.26	x	67.26	q
12	B	Nikola Lomnická	Slovakia	x	x	67.18	67.18	q
13	B	Fruzsina Fertig	Hungary	x	65.46	x	65.46	
14	A	Aksana Miankova	Belarus	x	66.92	x	66.92	
15	A	Tracey Andersson	Sweden	65.72	x	x	65.72	
16	A	Barbara Špiler	Slovenia	x	52.29	64.48	64.48	
17	A	Iryna Novozhylova	Ukraine	63.78	x	x	63.78	
18	B	Merja Korpela	Finland	x	61.80	63.71	63.71	
19	B	Sophie Hitchon	Great Britain	62.93	x	x	62.93	
20	A	Réka Gyurátz	Hungary	62.14	x	x	62.14	
21	B	Ida Storm	Sweden	60.82	x	x	60.82	
22	B	Kati Ojaloo	Estonia	59.63	58.56	59.61	59.63	
	A	Berta Castells	Spain	x	x	x	NM	
	A	Tereza Králová	Czech Republic	x	x	x	NM	
	B	Alena Navahrodskaya	Belarus	x	x	x	NM	

=== Final ===
Rank	Name	Nationality	#1	#2	#3	#4	#5	#6	Result	Notes
1st place, gold medalist(s)	Anita Włodarczyk	Poland	x	x	75.88	76.18	78.76	x	78.76	WL, CR, NR
2nd place, silver medalist(s)	Martina Hrašnová	Slovakia	71.66	x	73.03	69.72	74.66	73.21	74.66	
3rd place, bronze medalist(s)	Joanna Fiodorow	Poland	72.24	68.54	69.01	72.77	72.48	73.67	73.67	
4	Kathrin Klaas	Germany	70.72	72.89	71.81	70.71	x	69.84	72.89	
5	Betty Heidler	Germany	67.65	70.44	x	71.04	72.39	72.06	72.39	
6	Alexandra Tavernier	France	69.49	63.63	x	68.17	70.32	x	70.32	
7	Bianca Perie	Romania	69.25	69.26	x	x	x	68.14	69.26	
8	Nikola Lomnická	Slovakia	x	65.95	67.39	x	x	x	67.39	
9	Kateřina Šafránková	Czech Republic	x	63.32	64.94				64.94	
10	Carolin Paesler	Germany	x	x	61.89				61.89	
DQ	Anna Bulgakova	Russia	x	x	x				NM	
	Éva Orbán	Hungary	x	x	x				NM	
