= 2016 European Athletics Championships – Women's hammer throw =

Women's hammer throw at the European Athletics Championships
- Venue: Olympic Stadium
- Location: Amsterdam
- Dates: 6 July (qualification); 8 July (final)
- Competitors: 30 from 16 nations
- Winning mark: 78.14 m

Medalists
gold medal	Anita Włodarczyk	Poland
silver medal	Betty Heidler	Germany
bronze medal	Hanna Skydan	Azerbaijan

The women's hammer throw at the 2016 European Athletics Championships took place at the Olympic Stadium on 6 and 8 July.

== Records ==
Standing records prior to the 2016 European Athletics Championships
World record	Anita Włodarczyk (POL)	81.08 m	Władysławowo, Poland	1 August 2015
European record	Anita Włodarczyk (POL)	81.08 m	Władysławowo, Poland	1 August 2015
Championship record	Anita Włodarczyk (POL)	78.76 m	Zürich, Switzerland	15 August 2014
World Leading	Anita Włodarczyk (POL)	79.61 m	Szczecin, Poland	18 June 2016
European Leading	Anita Włodarczyk (POL)	79.61 m	Szczecin, Poland	18 June 2016

== Schedule ==
Date	Time	Round
6 July 2016	10:45	Qualification
8 July 2016	18:10	Final

All times are local times (UTC+2)

== Results ==
=== Qualification ===
Qualification: 70.00 m (Q) or best 12 (q)

Rank	Group	Name	Nationality	#1	#2	#3	Result	Note
1	B	Anita Włodarczyk	Poland	65.79	73.94		73.94	Q
2	A	Betty Heidler	Germany	71.46			71.46	Q
3	B	Hanna Skydan	Azerbaijan	70.41			70.41	Q
4	A	Kateřina Šafránková	Czech Republic	63.61	70.04		70.04	Q
5	A	Zalina Marghieva	Moldova	x	70.04		70.04	Q
6	A	Sophie Hitchon	Great Britain	67.46	68.73	69.48	69.48	q
7	B	Iryna Novozhylova	Ukraine	65.33	69.42	66.80	69.42	q
8	B	Joanna Fiodorow	Poland	69.35	x	68.99	69.35	q
9	A	Malwina Kopron	Poland	68.21	68.64	69.23	69.23	q
10	B	Martina Hrašnová	Slovakia	68.37	x	65.00	68.37	q
11	B	Tracey Andersson	Sweden	62.76	65.89	68.08	68.08	q
12	B	Berta Castells	Spain	68.07	66.96	63.53	68.07	q
13	B	Merja Korpela	Finland	67.78	67.33	64.72	67.78	
14	B	Marina Nichișenco	Moldova	66.89	67.76	x	67.76	
15	A	Alena Sobaleva	Belarus	66.78	65.37	x	66.78	
16	A	Inga Linna	Finland	64.91	66.01	66.53	66.53	
17	B	Kıvılcım Salman	Turkey	x	65.97	62.23	65.97	
18	A	Éva Orbán	Hungary	x	65.86	65.40	65.86	
19	A	Alyona Shamotina	Ukraine	x	65.69	65.29	65.69	
20	B	Barbara Špiler	Slovenia	65.56	x	61.82	65.56	
21	A	Laura Redondo	Spain	65.23	63.82	x	65.23	
22	B	Charlene Woitha	Germany	62.72	63.82	64.90	64.90	
23	A	Marinda Petersson	Sweden	64.65	x	62.33	64.65	
24	A	Alena Krechyk	Belarus	64.42	61.30	x	64.42	
25	B	Kathrin Klaas	Germany	60.61	64.39	x	64.39	
26	B	Hanna Malyshchyk	Belarus	63.16	x	x	63.16	
27	A	Veronika Kaňuchová	Slovakia	62.86	x	x	62.86	
28	A	Tuğçe Şahutoğlu	Turkey	62.37	61.91	61.30	62.37	
	A	Alexandra Tavernier	France	x	x	x	NM	
	B	Fruzsina Fertig	Hungary	x	x	x	NM	

=== Final ===
Rank	Athlete	Nationality	#1	#2	#3	#4	#5	#6	Result	Notes
1st place, gold medalist(s)	Anita Włodarczyk	Poland	72.82	75.73	77.11	77.65	78.12	78.14	78.14	
2nd place, silver medalist(s)	Betty Heidler	Germany	71.27	73.19	75.77	71.31	73.64	74.35	75.77	SB
3rd place, bronze medalist(s)	Hanna Skydan	Azerbaijan	x	71.07	73.83	72.20	73.69	69.89	73.83	
4	Sophie Hitchon	Great Britain	70.91	71.74	71.33	70.03	71.59	71.41	71.74	
5	Zalina Marghieva	Moldova	70.26	68.25	71.04	70.49	68.77	71.73	71.73	
6	Malwina Kopron	Poland	70.91	68.32	67.66	x	x	69.41	70.91	
7	Martina Hrašnová	Slovakia	70.62	67.95	70.02	69.75	x	69.82	70.62	
8	Iryna Novozhylova	Ukraine	70.18	68.34	64.69	66.85	68.74	x	70.18	
9	Kateřina Šafránková	Czech Republic	69.55	68.37	x				69.55	
10	Joanna Fiodorow	Poland	68.80	69.35	69.48				69.48	
11	Tracey Andersson	Sweden	67.08	65.03	x				67.08	
12	Berta Castells	Spain	x	x	63.27				63.27	
