= 2012 World Junior Championships in Athletics – Women's hammer throw =

The women's hammer throw at the 2012 World Junior Championships in Athletics was held at the Estadi Olímpic Lluís Companys on 12 and 14 July.

== Medalists ==
| Gold | Silver | Bronze |
|---|---|---|
| Alexandra Tavernier; France | Alexia Sedykh; France | Alena Navahrodskaya; Belarus |

== Records ==
Prior to the competition, the existing world junior and championship records were as follows.

| World Junior Record | Zhang Wenxiu (CHN) | 73.24 m | Changsha, China | 24 June 2005 |
| Championship Record | Bianca Perie (ROU) | 67.95 m | Bydgoszcz, Poland | 9 July 2008 |
| World Junior Leading | Alexandra Tavernier (FRA) | 68.44 m | Forbach, France | 27 May 2012 |
Broken records during the 2012 World Junior Championships in Athletics
| Championship Record & World Junior Leading | Alexandra Tavernier (FRA) | 70.62 | Barcelona, Spain | 14 July 2012 |

=== Qualification ===
Qual. rule: qualification standard 62.00 m (Q) or at least best 12 qualified (q)

| Rank | Group | Name | Nationality | #1 | #2 | #3 | Result | Note |
|---|---|---|---|---|---|---|---|---|
| 1 | B | Alexandra Tavernier | France | 66.22 | | | 66.22 | Q |
| 2 | B | Alena Navahrodskaya | Belarus | 59.44 | 65.61 | | 65.61 | Q |
| 3 | A | Alexia Sedykh | France | 65.54 | | | 65.54 | Q |
| 4 | A | Julia Ratcliffe | New Zealand | X | 63.22 | | 63.22 | Q |
| 5 | B | Na Luo | China | 61.54 | X | 59.45 | 61.54 | q |
| 6 | A | Iliána Korosídou | Greece | 60.09 | X | 61.01 | 61.01 | q |
| 7 | B | Bianca Lazar Fazecas | Romania | X | 51.01 | 60.92 | 60.92 | q, PB |
| 8 | B | Abbi Carter | Great Britain | 60.75 | 58.70 | 55.87 | 60.75 | q, PB |
| 9 | A | Shelby Ashe | United States | X | 60.19 | X | 60.19 | q |
| 10 | A | Réka Gyurátz | Hungary | X | 56.22 | 60.01 | 60.01 | q |
| 11 | A | Elizabeta Tsareva | Russia | 59.93 | 54.34 | 53.34 | 59.93 | q |
| 12 | B | Eva Reinders | Netherlands | 59.32 | X | 57.57 | 59.32 | q |
| 13 | A | Danielle McConnell | Australia | 53.67 | 58.87 | 58.94 | 58.94 | |
| 14 | B | Viktoriya Sadova | Russia | 57.46 | 58.78 | X | 58.78 | |
| 15 | B | Heli Rinnekari | Finland | X | 57.99 | 58.01 | 58.01 | |
| 16 | B | Jennifer Nevado | Spain | X | 53.49 | 57.93 | 57.93 | |
| 17 | B | Mikayla Genge | Australia | 57.87 | X | X | 57.87 | PB |
| 18 | B | DeAnna Price | United States | 55.03 | 56.34 | 57.82 | 57.82 | |
| 19 | B | Valeriia Semenkova | Ukraine | 57.45 | X | X | 57.45 | SB |
| 20 | B | Petra Jakeljic | Croatia | 56.11 | 56.03 | 56.65 | 56.65 | |
| 21 | A | Roxana Perie | Romania | 50.13 | 56.18 | 54.84 | 56.18 | |
| 22 | A | Yolanda González | Mexico | 49.35 | 55.66 | 55.19 | 55.66 | |
| 23 | A | Claudia Štravs | Slovenia | 54.19 | 54.45 | 53.86 | 54.45 | |
| 24 | B | Veronika Kanuchová | Slovakia | X | 54.30 | X | 54.30 | |
| 25 | A | Génesis Olivera | Venezuela | 51.11 | X | 54.23 | 54.23 | |
| 26 | B | Paola Miranda | Paraguay | X | 53.14 | X | 53.14 | |
| 27 | A | Catherine Beatty | Cyprus | X | 52.42 | 52.19 | 52.42 | |
| 28 | A | Marinda Petersson | Sweden | 50.25 | 49.61 | X | 50.25 | |
| 29 | B | Agápi Proskinitopoúlou | Greece | X | 49.16 | X | 49.16 | |
| 30 | B | Sandra Malinowska | Poland | X | 45.19 | X | 45.19 | |
| – | A | Al'ona Shamotina | Ukraine | X | X | X | NM | |
| – | A | Daniela Gómez | Argentina | X | X | X | NM | |
| – | B | Ecem Akçakara | Turkey | X | X | X | NM | |
| – | B | Eleni Larsson | Sweden | X | X | X | NM | |
| – | B | Fruzsina Fertig | Hungary | X | X | X | NM | |
| – | A | Hanna Zinchuk | Belarus | X | X | X | NM | |
| – | A | Malwina Kopron | Poland | X | X | X | NM | |
| – | A | Mikaela Gerkman | Finland | X | X | X | NM | |
| – | A | Sara Savatovic | Serbia | X | X | X | NM | |

=== Final ===
| Rank | Name | Nationality | #1 | #2 | #3 | #4 | #5 | #6 | Result | Note |
|---|---|---|---|---|---|---|---|---|---|---|
| 1st place, gold medalist(s) | Alexandra Tavernier | France | 66.14 | X | X | 70.62 | 69.12 | X | 70.62 | CR |
| 2nd place, silver medalist(s) | Alexia Sedykh | France | 65.29 | 67.34 | 64.99 | 66.76 | 63.74 | 65.64 | 67.34 | |
| 3rd place, bronze medalist(s) | Alena Navahrodskaya | Belarus | 62.96 | 67.13 | X | 63.26 | X | 60.89 | 67.13 | PB |
| 4 | Julia Ratcliffe | New Zealand | 60.62 | 67.00 | 65.90 | X | 66.63 | 65.33 | 67.00 | AJ |
| 5 | Iliána Korosídou | Greece | 61.00 | 60.36 | 63.32 | 58.90 | 59.62 | X | 63.32 | PB |
| 6 | Na Luo | China | X | 60.28 | 63.19 | 59.77 | 59.89 | X | 63.19 | |
| 7 | Eva Reinders | Netherlands | 61.63 | 59.40 | X | X | 59.08 | 56.27 | 61.63 | |
| 8 | Réka Gyurátz | Hungary | 57.25 | 60.88 | 59.46 | X | 58.38 | 60.09 | 60.88 | |
| 9 | Elizabeta Tsareva | Russia | 58.70 | 55.85 | 60.72 | | | | 60.72 | |
| 10 | Shelby Ashe | United States | X | 58.62 | X | | | | 58.62 | |
| 11 | Bianca Lazar Fazecas | Romania | 57.67 | X | 58.09 | | | | 58.09 | |
| 12 | Abbi Carter | Great Britain | 56.46 | 56.49 | X | | | | 56.49 | |

== Participation ==
According to an unofficial count, 39 athletes from 27 countries participated in the event.

- Argentina (1)
- Australia (2)
- Belarus (2)
- China (1)
- Croatia (1)
- Cyprus (1)
- Finland (2)
- France (2)
- Greece (2)
- Hungary (2)
- Mexico (1)
- Netherlands (1)
- New Zealand (1)
- Paraguay (1)
- Poland (2)
- Romania (2)
- Russia (2)
- Serbia (1)
- Slovakia (1)
- Slovenia (1)
- Spain (1)
- Sweden (2)
- Turkey (1)
- Ukraine (2)
- United Kingdom (1)
- United States (2)
- Venezuela (1)
