= Belarus at the 2015 World Championships in Athletics =

- WA code: BLR

in Beijing
- Competitors: 18
- Medals Ranked 14th: Gold 1 Silver 0 Bronze 1 Total 2

World Championships in Athletics appearances
- 1993; 1995; 1997; 1999; 2001; 2003; 2005; 2007; 2009; 2011; 2013; 2015; 2017; 2019; 2022–2025

Belarus competed at the 2015 World Championships in Athletics in Beijing, China, from 22 to 30 August 2015. It won 1 gold and 1 bronze medal.

== Medalists ==
Medal	Athlete	Event	Date
Gold	Maryna Arzamasova	800 metres	29 August
Bronze	Alina Talay	100 metres hurdles	28 August

== Results ==
(q – qualified, NM – no mark, SB – season best)

=== Men ===
Track and road events

Athlete	Event	Heat		Semifinal		Final	
Athlete	Event	Result	Rank	Result	Rank	Result	Rank
Aliaksandr Linnik	400 metres	45.79	7	Did not advance			
Aliaksandr Liakhovich	20 kilometres walk	—N/a				DQ	
Dzianis Simanovich	20 kilometres walk	—N/a				1:23.54	23

Field events

Athlete	Event	Qualification		Final	
Athlete	Event	Distance	Position	Distance	Position
Kanstantsin Barycheuski	Long jump	7.89	17	Did not advance	
Pavel Bareisha	Hammer throw	71.41	25	Did not advance	
Yury Shayunou	Hammer throw	72.87	18	Did not advance	
Ivan Tsikhan	Hammer throw	71.88	21	Did not advance	

=== Women ===
Track and road events

Athlete	Event	Heat		Semifinal		Final	
Athlete	Event	Result	Rank	Result	Rank	Result	Rank
Maryna Arzamasova	800 metres	1:58.69 SB	1 Q	1:57.54 PB	2 Q	1:58.03	1st place, gold medalist(s)
Alina Talay	100 metres hurdles	12.87	3 Q	12.70 PB	3 q	12.66 NR	3rd place, bronze medalist(s)
Sviatlana Kudzelich	3000 metres steeplechase	DNF	–	—N/a		Did not advance	

Field events

Athlete	Event	Qualification		Final	
Athlete	Event	Distance	Position	Distance	Position
Nastassia Mironchyk-Ivanova	Long jump	6.76	6 Q	6.66	9
Volha Sudarava	Long jump	6.65	13	Did not advance	
Aliona Dubitskaya	Shot put	18.51	7 Q	18.52	6
Yuliya Leantsiuk	Shot put	17.96	11 q	18.25	7
Natallia Mikhnevich	Shot put	18.57	5 Q	18.24	8
Alena Krechyk	Hammer throw	NM		Did not advance	
Alena Sobaleva	Hammer throw	69.86	12 q	70.09	10
Tatsiana Khaladovich	Javelin throw	60.07	21	Did not advance	
