= 2013 European Athletics U23 Championships – Women's hammer throw =

The Women's hammer throw event at the 2013 European Athletics U23 Championships was held in Tampere, Finland, at Ratina Stadium on 12 and 13 July.

== Medalists ==
| Gold | Sophie Hitchon; United Kingdom |
| Silver | Barbara Špiler; Slovenia |
| Bronze | Alexia Sedykh; France |

== Results ==
=== Final ===
13 July 2013

| Rank | Name | Nationality | Attempts | | | | | | Result | Notes |
| Rank | Name | Nationality | 1 | 2 | 3 | 4 | 5 | 6 | Result | Notes |
|---|---|---|---|---|---|---|---|---|---|---|
| 1st place, gold medalist(s) | Sophie Hitchon | United Kingdom | 68.12 | 68.80 | x | x | 5.25 | 70.72 | 70.72 | |
| 2nd place, silver medalist(s) | Barbara Špiler | Slovenia | 67.43 | 64.96 | 68.98 | 69.69 | 68.30 | x | 69.69 | |
| 3rd place, bronze medalist(s) | Alexia Sedykh | France | 65.24 | x | 65.99 | 64.09 | 66.67 | 66.18 | 66.67 | |
| 4 | Fruzsina Fertig | Hungary | 66.01 | x | x | 63.82 | 60.24 | 66.28 | 66.28 | |
| 5 | Yelizaveta Tsareva | Russia | 65.39 | 63.80 | 64.38 | x | 63.83 | 66.23 | 66.23 | |
| 6 | Alena Navahrodskaya | Belarus | 4.76 | x | 63.89 | 65.39 | 66.10 | 65.06 | 66.10 | SB |
| 7 | Eleni Larsson | Sweden | 64.88 | 62.39 | 58.97 | 58.55 | 62.62 | 61.86 | 64.88 | |
| 8 | Elisa Magni | Italy | 59.66 | 59.70 | 62.96 | x | x | 61.07 | 62.96 | PB |
| 9 | Jenni Penttilä | Finland | 61.54 | 62.01 | 61.40 | | | | 62.01 | |
| 10 | Francesca Massobrio | Italy | 59.66 | 61.43 | 59.58 | | | | 61.43 | |
| 11 | Dagmara Stala | Poland | x | 60.52 | x | | | | 60.52 | |
| 12 | Bianca Lazăr | Romania | x | 57.12 | 58.42 | | | | 58.42 | |

=== Qualifications ===
Qualified: qualifying perf. 64.50 (Q) or 12 best performers (q) advance to the Final

==== Summary ====
| Rank | Name | Nationality | Result | Notes |
|---|---|---|---|---|
| 1 | Yelizaveta Tsareva | Russia | 67.59 | Q PB |
| 2 | Eleni Larsson | Sweden | 67.13 | Q PB |
| 3 | Sophie Hitchon | United Kingdom | 66.85 | Q |
| 4 | Barbara Špiler | Slovenia | 66.48 | Q |
| 5 | Alexia Sedykh | France | 66.44 | Q |
| 6 | Fruzsina Fertig | Hungary | 65.59 | Q |
| 7 | Dagmara Stala | Poland | 63.80 | q PB |
| 8 | Jenni Penttilä | Finland | 63.59 | q |
| 9 | Alena Navahrodskaya | Belarus | 62.48 | q |
| 10 | Francesca Massobrio | Italy | 62.23 | q |
| 11 | Bianca Lazăr | Romania | 61.87 | q |
| 12 | Elisa Magni | Italy | 61.48 | q |
| 13 | Cintia Gergelics | Hungary | 61.13 | |
| 14 | Ilse Kaaja | Finland | 60.94 | PB |
| 15 | Ida Storm | Sweden | 60.84 | |
| 16 | Katja Vangsnes | Norway | 60.45 | |
| 17 | Zeliha Uzunbilek | Turkey | 59.49 | |
| 18 | Malin Johansson | Sweden | 58.45 | |
| 19 | Sandra Malinowska | Poland | 58.40 | |
| 20 | Sara Savatović | Serbia | 57.34 | |
| 21 | Marte Rygg Årdal | Norway | 54.27 | |
| | Alexandra Tavernier | France | NM | |

==== Details ====
===== Group A =====
12 July 2013 / 10:00

| Rank | Name | Nationality | Attempts | | | Result | Notes |
| Rank | Name | Nationality | 1 | 2 | 3 | Result | Notes |
|---|---|---|---|---|---|---|---|
| 1 | Eleni Larsson | Sweden | 62.91 | 67.13 | | 67.13 | Q PB |
| 2 | Sophie Hitchon | United Kingdom | 66.85 | | | 66.85 | Q |
| 3 | Alexia Sedykh | France | 66.44 | | | 66.44 | Q |
| 4 | Alena Navahrodskaya | Belarus | x | 62.48 | 6.91 | 62.48 | q |
| 5 | Elisa Magni | Italy | 60.27 | 60.50 | 61.48 | 61.48 | q |
| 6 | Cintia Gergelics | Hungary | 56.58 | 60.84 | 61.13 | 61.13 | |
| 7 | Ilse Kaaja | Finland | 60.20 | 60.94 | 58.07 | 60.94 | PB |
| 8 | Ida Storm | Sweden | x | x | 60.84 | 60.84 | |
| 9 | Sandra Malinowska | Poland | 58.27 | 58.40 | 55.18 | 58.40 | |
| 10 | Sara Savatović | Serbia | 56.43 | 57.23 | 57.34 | 57.34 | |
| 11 | Marte Rygg Årdal | Norway | x | 54.27 | 28.81 | 54.27 | |

===== Group B =====
12 July 2013 / 11:15

| Rank | Name | Nationality | Attempts | | | Result | Notes |
| Rank | Name | Nationality | 1 | 2 | 3 | Result | Notes |
|---|---|---|---|---|---|---|---|
| 1 | Yelizaveta Tsareva | Russia | 67.59 | | | 67.59 | Q PB |
| 2 | Barbara Špiler | Slovenia | 66.48 | | | 66.48 | Q |
| 3 | Fruzsina Fertig | Hungary | 61.49 | 65.59 | | 65.59 | Q |
| 4 | Dagmara Stala | Poland | 60.60 | 60.95 | 63.80 | 63.80 | q PB |
| 5 | Jenni Penttilä | Finland | 63.46 | x | 63.59 | 63.59 | q |
| 6 | Francesca Massobrio | Italy | 60.10 | 62.23 | 61.30 | 62.23 | q |
| 7 | Bianca Lazăr | Romania | 58.40 | 61.87 | 58.11 | 61.87 | q |
| 8 | Katja Vangsnes | Norway | 60.45 | 57.87 | 60.19 | 60.45 | |
| 9 | Zeliha Uzunbilek | Turkey | 58.05 | 58.61 | 59.49 | 59.49 | |
| 10 | Malin Johansson | Sweden | x | 58.45 | x | 58.45 | |
| | Alexandra Tavernier | France | x | x | x | NM | |

== Participation ==
According to an unofficial count, 22 athletes from 14 countries participated in the event.

- Belarus (1)
- Finland (2)
- France (2)
- Hungary (2)
- Italy (2)
- Norway (2)
- Poland (2)
- Romania (1)
- Russia (1)
- Serbia (1)
- Slovenia (1)
- Sweden (3)
- Turkey (1)
- United Kingdom (1)
