= 2010 World Junior Championships in Athletics – Women's hammer throw =

Hammer throw event

The women's hammer throw event at the 2010 World Junior Championships in Athletics was held in Moncton, New Brunswick, Canada, at Moncton Stadium on 22 and 24 July.

== Medalists ==
Gold	Sophie Hitchon; United Kingdom
Silver	Barbara Špiler; Slovenia
Bronze	Zhang Li; China

== Results ==
=== Final ===
24 July

Rank	Name	Nationality	Attempts						Result	Notes
Rank	Name	Nationality	1	2	3	4	5	6	Result	Notes
1st place, gold medalist(s)	Sophie Hitchon	United Kingdom	62.72	64.55	x	63.41	63.72	66.01	66.01	
2nd place, silver medalist(s)	Barbara Špiler	Slovenia	61.33	64.44	62.42	65.07	65.28	58.54	65.28	
3rd place, bronze medalist(s)	Zhang Li	China	58.68	62.27	x	61.52	63.96	x	63.96	
4	Wang Yingying	China	59.43	58.11	59.19	x	58.91	57.58	59.43	
5	Jenni Penttilä	Finland	x	55.78	58.39	58.69	59.01	57.09	59.01	
6	Ayla Gill	New Zealand	x	x	56.57	57.28	x	53.39	57.28	
7	Elisa Magni	Italy	51.61	55.33	56.34	x	56.87	x	56.87	
8	Elina Uustalo	Finland	x	56.73	x	x	55.68	x	56.73	
9	Katja Vangsnes	Norway	x	55.55	55.90				55.90	
10	Cintia Gergelics	Hungary	x	55.56	x				55.56	
11	Dagmara Stala	Poland	x	x	54.44				54.44	
	Bianca Lazar	Romania	x	x	x				NM	

=== Qualifications ===
22 July

==== Group A ====
Rank	Name	Nationality	Attempts			Result	Notes
Rank	Name	Nationality	1	2	3	Result	Notes
1	Sophie Hitchon	United Kingdom	62.32	-	-	62.32	Q
2	Wang Yingying	China	57.53	55.99	56.18	57.53	q
3	Katja Vangsnes	Norway	54.18	55.28	53.31	55.28	q
4	Elina Uustalo	Finland	53.69	x	52.34	53.69	q
5	Elisa Magni	Italy	51.06	53.67	50.82	53.67	q
6	Petronella Vincze	Hungary	52.90	49.66	51.29	52.90	
7	Eva Reinders	Netherlands	x	52.89	49.06	52.89	
8	Galina Mityaeva	Tajikistan	x	x	52.81	52.81	
9	Nehal Kamal Fahmy	Egypt	52.54	x	x	52.54	
10	Jennifer Nevado	Spain	x	51.86	50.61	51.86	
11	Malin Johansson	Sweden	49.78	x	51.74	51.74	
12	Zeliha Uzunbilek	Turkey	50.86	x	46.23	50.86	
13	Shelby Ashe	United States	50.59	x	x	50.59	
14	Joanna Franke-Kuhn	Canada	49.37	48.73	x	49.37	
15	Sara Pizi	Italy	x	47.56	x	47.56	
	Yirisleydi Ford	Cuba	x	x	x	NM	
	Park Hee-Soen	South Korea	x	x	x	NM	

==== Group B ====
Rank	Name	Nationality	Attempts			Result	Notes
Rank	Name	Nationality	1	2	3	Result	Notes
1	Zhang Li	China	64.02	-	-	64.02	Q
2	Barbara Špiler	Slovenia	x	57.14	-	57.14	q
3	Jenni Penttilä	Finland	x	56.31	54.62	56.31	q
4	Bianca Lazar	Romania	54.56	x	51.31	54.56	q
5	Ayla Gill	New Zealand	54.16	x	53.61	54.16	q
6	Cintia Gergelics	Hungary	48.95	53.89	x	53.89	q
7	Dagmara Stala	Poland	x	46.45	53.39	53.39	q
8	Annemie Smith	South Africa	44.59	x	53.26	53.26	
9	Lara Nielsen	Australia	48.31	52.48	53.20	53.20	
10	Myra Perkins	United Kingdom	45.77	x	52.20	52.20	
11	Ellina Anissimova	Estonia	51.01	51.74	51.88	51.88	
12	Ida Storm	Sweden	48.49	49.01	x	49.01	
13	Hanna Skidan	Ukraine	x	48.78	x	48.78	
14	Lauren Chambers	United States	46.02	x	x	46.02	
	Rana Taha	Egypt	x	x	x	NM	
	Delphine Ramothe	France	x	x	x	NM	
	Irina Sarvilova	Russia	x	x	x	NM	

== Participation ==
According to an unofficial count, 34 athletes from 26 countries participated in the event.

- Australia (1)
- Canada (1)
- China (2)
- Cuba (1)
- Egypt (2)
- Estonia (1)
- Finland (2)
- France (1)
- Hungary (2)
- Italy (2)
- Netherlands (1)
- New Zealand (1)
- Norway (1)
- Poland (1)
- Romania (1)
- Russia (1)
- Slovenia (1)
- South Africa (1)
- South Korea (1)
- Spain (1)
- Sweden (2)
- Tajikistan (1)
- Turkey (1)
- Ukraine (1)
- United Kingdom (2)
- United States (2)
