= Yirisleydi Ford =

Cuban hammer thrower (born 1991)

Personal information
- Full name: Yirisleydi Lisbet Ford Carnonell
- Born: 18 August 1991 (age 35) Sancti Spíritus, Cuba
- Height: 1.68 m (5 ft 6 in)
- Weight: 66 kg (146 lb)

Sport
- Sport: Track and field
- Event: Hammer throw
- Updated on 29 August 2015

Yirisleydi Lisbet Ford Carnonell (born 18 August 1991 in Sancti Spíritus) is a Cuban athlete specialising in the hammer throw.

She competed at the 2015 World Championships in Beijing, narrowly missing the final.

Her personal best in the event is 72.40 metres set in Havana in 2015.

== Competition record ==
Year	Competition	Venue	Position	Notes
Representing Cuba
2007	World Youth Championships	Ostrava, Czech Republic	9th	53.14 m
2009	Pan American Junior Championships	Port of Spain, Trinidad and Tobago	1st	63.92 m
2010	World Junior Championships	Moncton, Canada	–	NM
2014	Pan American Sports Festival	Mexico City, Mexico	5th	68.44 m
2014	Central American and Caribbean Games	Veracruz, Mexico	2nd	69.62 m
2015	Pan American Games	Toronto, Canada	5th	65.73 m
2015	NACAC Championships	San José, Costa Rica	3rd	69.91 m
2015	World Championships	Beijing, China	15th (q)	69.43 m
2016	Olympic Games	Rio de Janeiro, Brazil	32nd (q)	10.91 m
