= Alena Krechyk =

Belarusian hammer thrower

Personal information
- Born: 20 July 1987 (age 38)

Sport
- Country: Belarus
- Sport: Track and field
- Event: Hammer throw
- Updated on 29 August 2015

Alena Krechyk (Belarusian: Алена Крэчык; born 20 July 1987) is a Belarusian athlete specialising in the hammer throw. She competed at the 2015 World Championships in Beijing without registering a valid mark.

Krechyk was an All-American thrower for the Kansas Jayhawks track and field team. She was said to lead the team during Big 12 Conference competition and finished 3rd in the hammer throw at the 2013 NCAA Division I Outdoor Track and Field Championships.

Her personal best in the event is 72.06 metres set in Brest in 2015.

== Competition record ==
Year	Competition	Venue	Position	Event	Notes
Representing Belarus
2006	World Junior Championships	Beijing, China	12th	Hammer throw	54.48 m
2009	European U23 Championships	Kaunas, Lithuania	–	Hammer throw	NM
2015	World Championships	Beijing, China	–	Hammer throw	NM
2016	European Championships	Amsterdam, Netherlands	24th (q)	Hammer throw	64.42 m

== See also ==
- Belarus at the 2015 World Championships in Athletics
