= Llorenç Cassi =

Spanish athlete (1940–2020)

Llorenç Cassi i Morató (14 May 1940 – 23 March 2020), was a Spanish Catalan athlete and coach, specialized in the disc, weight and hammer throw.

== Biography and career ==
Cassi was born in Barcelona on 14 May 1940 and was a disciple of Nemesi Ponsati at CN Barcelona, a club with which he competed. He was five times champion of Catalonia in hammer throw during the 1960s, three more in discus during the 1970s and twice in indoor shot put. He set the records of Catalonia and Spain in hammer throw. He was never Spanish champion, but he obtained two runner-up positions (1963, 1964) and two third places (1965, 1966) in hammer, and a third place in discus (1975). He was 6 times absolute international (1964–1975) and four times junior international (from 1959 to 1961).

Once he retired, he coached athletes such as his niece Sonia Godall, Laura Redondo, Berta Castells or Miguel Alberto Blanco, as well as being in charge of throwing events for the Catalan and Spanish federations and professor at the National School of Coaches.

== Death ==
He died on 23 March 2020, at the age of 79, as a result of COVID-19 during the pandemic in Spain.

== Achievements ==
- Champion of Catalonia:
  - hammer throw: 1961, 1963, 1964, 1965, 1966
  - disc throw: 1971, 1974, 1975
  - weight throw (indoor track): 1971, 1974
