= Laura Redondo =

Spanish hammer thrower

Personal information
- Full name: Laura Redondo Mora
- Nationality: Spanish
- Born: 3 July 1988 (age 38) Barcelona, Spain
- Height: 1.65 m (5 ft 5 in)
- Weight: 80 kg (176 lb)

Sport
- Sport: Track and field
- Event: Hammer throw
- Club: F.C. Barcelona
- Coached by: Llorenç Cassi
Medal record
Women's athletics
Representing Spain
Mediterranean Games
Silver medal – second place	2026 Taranto	Hammer throw
- Updated on 1 September 2015

Laura Redondo Mora (born 3 July 1988 in Barcelona) is a Spanish athlete specialising in the hammer throw. She competed at the 2015 World Championships in Beijing without qualifying for the final.

Her personal best in the event is 70,40 metres set in Montijo in 2021.

== Competition record ==
Year	Competition	Venue	Position	Event	Notes
Representing Spain
2007	European Junior Championships	Hengelo, Netherlands	13th	Hammer throw	52.58 m
2009	European U23 Championships	Kaunas, Lithuania	9th	Hammer throw	58.14 m
2010	Ibero-American Championships	San Fernando, Spain	4th	Hammer throw	63.38 m
2012	European Championships	Helsinki, Finland	–	Hammer throw	NM
2015	World Championships	Beijing, China	29th (q)	Hammer throw	63.86 m
2016	European Championships	Amsterdam, Netherlands	21st (q)	Hammer throw	65.23 m
2018	Mediterranean Games	Tarragona, Spain	5th	Hammer throw	63.89 m
2021	Olympic Games	Tokyo, Japan	29th (q)	Hammer throw	62.42 m
2022	Ibero-American Championships	La Nucia, Spain	1st	Hammer throw	68.68 m
2022	Mediterranean Games	Oran, Algeria	1st	Hammer throw	69.97 m
2022	World Championships	Eugene, United States	19th (q)	Hammer throw	68.67 m
2022	European Championships	Munich, Germany	13th (q)	Hammer throw	67.62 m
2023	European Games	Chorzów, Poland	13th	Hammer throw	67.05 m
2023	World Championships	Budapest, Hungary	29th (q)	Hammer throw	66.95 m
2026	European Championships	Birmingham, United Kingdom	27th (q)	Hammer throw	61.54 m
2026	Mediterranean Games	Taranto, Italy	2nd	Hammer throw	67.82 m
