= Kıvılcım Kaya =

Turkish hammer thrower (born 1992)

Kıvılcım Kaya Salman
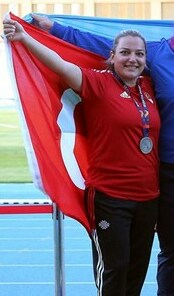
- Kıvılcım Kaya Salman in 2022

Personal information
- Nationality: Turkish
- Born: Kıvılcim Kaya; March 27, 1992 (age 34) Ankara, Turkey
- Height: 165 cm (5 ft 5 in)
- Weight: 70 kg (154 lb)

Sport
- Sport: Athletics
- Event: Hammer throw
- Club: EGO Spor, Ankara
- Coached by: Artun Talay

Achievements and titles
- Personal best: 72.55 m
Medal record
Women's Athletics
Representing Turkey
Mediterranean Games
Silver medal – second place	2018 Tarragona	Hammer throw
Silver medal – second place	2022 Oran	Hammer throw
European Team Championships
Gold medal – first place	2017 Lille	Hammer throw
Islamic Solidarity Games
Silver medal – second place	2017 Baku	Hammer throw
Silver medal – second place	2021 Konya	Hammer throw
World Youth Championships
Silver medal – second place	2009 Brixen	Hammer throw
European Junior Championships
Silver medal – second place	2011 Tallinn	Hammer throw
European Youth Olympic Festival
Silver medal – second place	2009 Tampere	Hammer throw

Kıvılcım Kaya Salman (pronounced [ˈcɯvɯlˈdʒɯm kaˈja]; born Kıvılcim Kaya on March 27, 1992, in Ankara) is a Turkish female hammer thrower.

She is the daughter of the former Turkish national wrestler Ziya Kaya. She began working with Artun Talay, who guided to Eşref Apak for Olympics bronze medal in Athens 2004. She made first big step to international scene at 2009 World Youth Championships in Brixen, after taking the silver medal in the girl's hammer throw competition. Then she broke national junior hammer record in Ankara with a 65.10 meter throw. She then took the silver medal at the 2011 European Junior Championships.

Kıvılcım threw 72.55 metres at the Turkish Championships.

At the 2013 Turkish championships, she tested positive for doping and was suspended between June 2013 and June 2015.

She competed at the 2012 Summer Olympics, the 2015 World Championships, the 2016 European Championships and the 2016 Summer Olympics without reaching the final.

At the 2022 Mediterranean Games, she won silver with a throw of 69.82 m. At Islamic Games of that year, she won silver with a throw of 65.68m.
