= Tracey Andersson =

Swedish hammer thrower

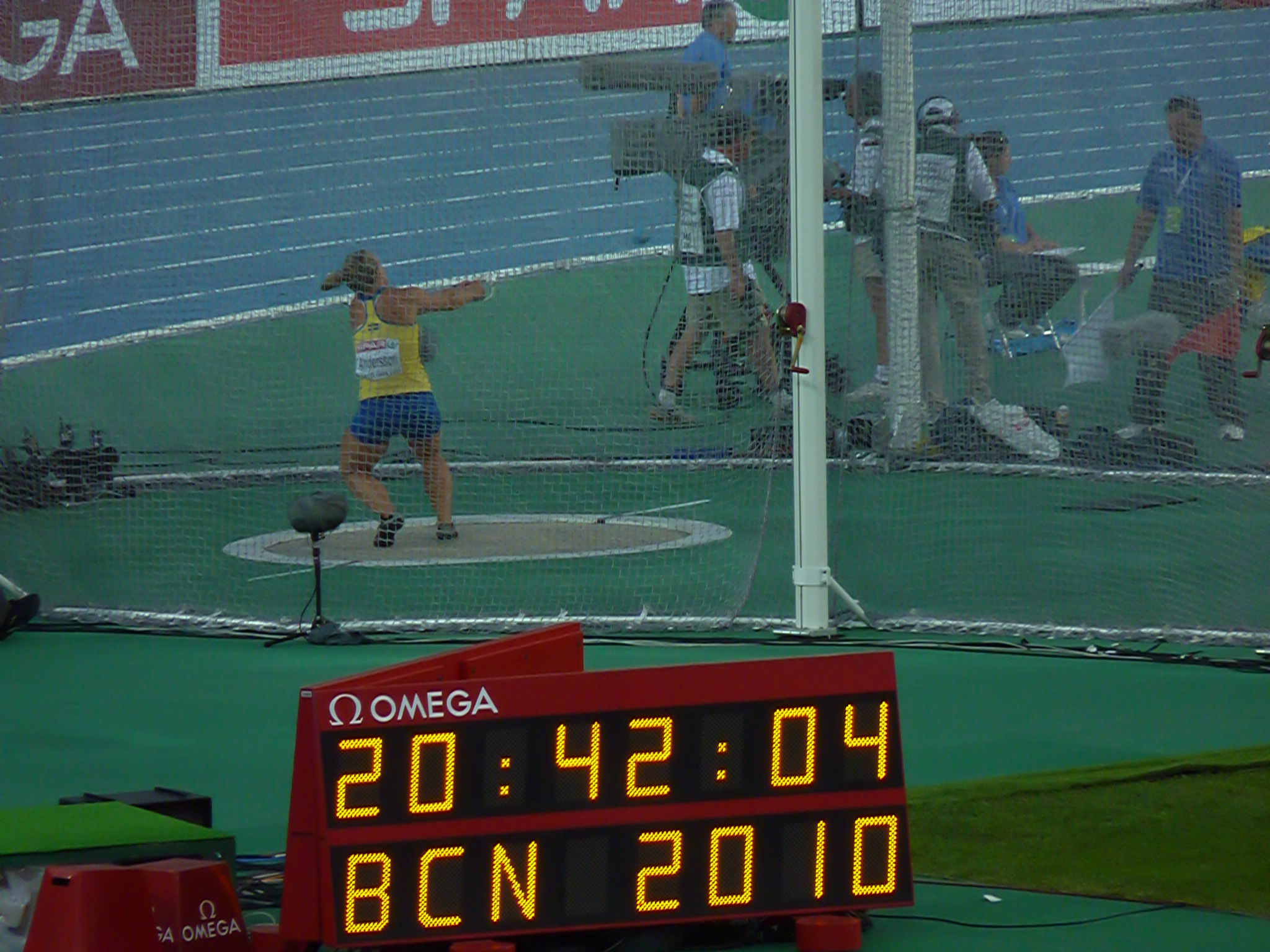

Tracey Andersson (born 5 December 1984 in Trelleborg) is a Swedish hammer thrower.

Her personal best in the event is 70.82 metres achieved in March 2013 in Castellón. This is the current national record.

== Achievements ==
| Year | Competition | Venue | Position | Notes |
Representing Sweden
| 2003 | European Junior Championships | Tampere, Finland | 20th (q) | 55.16 m |
| 2005 | European U23 Championships | Erfurt, Germany | 10th | 59.76 m |
| 2006 | European Championships | Gothenburg, Sweden | 38th (q) | 58.77 m |
| 2009 | European Cup Winter Throwing | Los Realejos, Spain | 19th | 63.04 m |
| 2010 | European Cup Winter Throwing | Arles, France | 18th | 61.53 m |
| 2010 | European Championships | Barcelona, Spain | 11th | 65.13 m |
| 2011 | European Cup Winter Throwing | Sofia, Bulgaria | 12th | 65.73 m |
| 2012 | European Cup Winter Throwing | Bar, Montenegro | 11th | 64.78 m |
| 2012 | European Championships | Helsinki, Finland | 13th (q) | 66.65 m |
| 2013 | European Cup Winter Throwing | Castellón, Spain | 4th | 70.82 m |
| 2013 | World Championships | Moscow, Russia | 26th (q) | 61.37 m |
| 2014 | European Cup Winter Throwing | Leiria, Portugal | 5th | 68.45 m |
| 2014 | European Championships | Zürich, Switzerland | 15th (q) | 65.72 m |
| 2015 | World Championships | Beijing, China | 26th (q) | 65.99 m |
| 2016 | European Championships | Amsterdam, Netherlands | 11th | 67.08 m |

== See also ==
- Tracy Anderson, an American fitness entrepreneur
