= Kateřina Šafránková =

Czech hammer thrower

Personal information
- Born: 8 June 1989 (age 37) Kolín, Czechoslovakia
- Height: 1.93 m (6 ft 4 in)
- Weight: 103 kg (227 lb)

Sport
- Country: Czech Republic
- Sport: Track and field
- Event: Hammer throw

Kateřina Šafránková (Czech pronunciation: [ˈkatɛr̝ɪna ˈʃafraːŋkovaː]; born 8 June 1989) is a Czech hammer thrower. She competed in the hammer throw event at the 2012 Summer Olympics. On 20 May 2016, she broke the national record in Ostrava with 72.34 m. She later beat that record with a mark of 72.47 in Kolin.

== Competition record ==
Year	Competition	Venue	Position	Notes
Representing the Czech Republic
2006	World Junior Championships	Beijing, China	11th	57.60 m
2007	European Junior Championships	Hengelo, Netherlands	2nd	62.95 m
2008	World Junior Championships	Bydgoszcz, Poland	2nd	63.13 m
2009	European U23 Championships	Kaunas, Lithuania	2nd	63.01 m
2010	European Championships	Barcelona, Spain	19th (q)	62.63 m
2011	European U23 Championships	Ostrava, Czech Republic	4th	67.94 m
2011	Universiade	Shenzhen, China	7th	67.18 m
2012	European Championships	Helsinki, Finland	14th (q)	66.51 m
2012	Olympic Games	London, United Kingdom	31st (q)	66.16 m
2014	European Championships	Zurich, Switzerland	9th	64.94 m
2016	European Championships	Amsterdam, Netherlands	9th	69.55 m
2016	Olympic Games	Rio de Janeiro, Brazil	17th (q)	68.33 m
2017	World Championships	London, United Kingdom	8th	71.34 m
2018	European Championships	Berlin, Germany	22nd (q)	64.85 m
2019	World Championships	Doha, Qatar	29th (q)	65.46 m
