= Barbara Špiler =

Slovenian hammer thrower

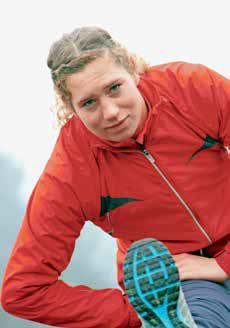
Barbara Špiler

Barbara Špiler (born 2 January 1992 in Brežice, Slovenia) is a Slovenian athlete who competes in the hammer throw. Špiler represented Slovenia at the 2012 Summer Olympics in London, where she finished 29th in the qualification round.

She participated in the 2013 and 2019 World Championships, and the 2012, 2014 and 2016 European Championships.

== Competition record ==
Year	Competition	Venue	Position	Notes
Representing Slovenia
2007	World Youth Championships	Ostrava, Czech Republic	3rd	55.97 m
2008	World Junior Championships	Bydgoszcz, Poland	4th	60.18 m
2009	European Cup Winter Throwing (U23)	Los Realejos, Spain	3rd	62.16 m
2010	European Cup Winter Throwing (U23)	Arles, France	3rd	62.99 m
2010	World Junior Championships	Moncton, Canada	2nd	65.28 m
2011	European Junior Championships	Tallinn, Estonia	1st	67.06 m
2012	European Cup Winter Throwing (U23)	Bar, Montenegro	4th	65.91 m
2012	European Championships	Helsinki, Finland	16th (q)	65.37 m
2012	Olympic Games	London, United Kingdom	29th (q)	67.21 m
2013	European U23 Championships	Tampere, Finland	2nd	69.69 m
2013	World Championships	Moscow, Russia	25th (q)	64.58 m
2014	European Championships	Zürich, Switzerland	16th (q)	64.48 m
2016	European Championships	Amsterdam, Netherlands	20th (q)	65.56 m
2019	World Championships	Doha, Qatar	27th (q)	65.76 m
