= Aliaksandr Liakhovich =

Belarusian racewalker

Personal information
- Full name: Aliaksandr Piatrovich Liakhovich
- Born: 4 July 1989 (age 36) Varnyany, Astravyets District, Grodno Oblast, Byelorussian SSR, Soviet Union

Sport
- Country: Belarus
- Sport: Track and field
- Event: racewalking
- Updated on 29 August 2015

Aliaksandr Piatrovich Liakhovich (Belarusian: Аляксандр Пятровіч Ляховіч; born 4 July 1989) is a male Belarusian racewalker. He competed in the 20 kilometres walk event at the 2015 World Championships in Athletics in Beijing, China, but was disqualified. In 2019, he competed in the men's 20 kilometres walk at the 2019 World Athletics Championships held in Doha, Qatar. He finished in 40th place.

== See also ==
- Belarus at the 2015 World Championships in Athletics
