= Alena Sobaleva =

Belarusian hammer thrower

Personal information
- Born: Alena Navahrodskaya; 11 May 1993 (age 33)
- Height: 1.78 m (5 ft 10 in)
- Weight: 87 kg (192 lb)

Sport
- Country: Belarus
- Sport: Track and field
- Event: Hammer throw
- Updated on 29 August 2015

Alena Aliaksandrauna Sobaleva, née Navahrodskaya (Belarusian: Алена Аляксандраўна Собалева (Навагродская); born 11 May 1993) is a Belarusian athlete specialising in the hammer throw. She competed at the 2015 World Championships in Beijing finishing tenth. In addition, she won the silver at the 2015 European U23 Championships.

Her personal best in the event is 72.86 metres set in Cheboksary in 2015.

== Competition record ==
Year	Competition	Venue	Position	Event	Notes
Representing Belarus
2009	World Youth Championships	Brixen, Italy	11th	Hammer throw	50.74 m
2009	European Youth Olympic Festival	Tampere, Finland	4th	Hammer throw	55.73 m
2010	Youth Olympic Games	Singapore	2nd	Hammer throw	57.34 m
2011	European Junior Championships	Tallinn, Estonia	4th	Hammer throw	61.83 m
2012	World Junior Championships	Barcelona, Spain	3rd	Hammer throw	67.13 m
2013	European U23 Championships	Tampere, Finland	6th	Hammer throw	66.10 m
2014	European Championships	Zurich, Switzerland	–	Hammer throw	NM
2015	European U23 Championships	Tallinn, Estonia	2nd	Hammer throw	71.20 m
2015	World Championships	Beijing, China	10th	Hammer throw	70.09 m
2016	European Championships	Amsterdam, Netherlands	15th (q)	Hammer throw	66.78 m
2016	Olympic Games	Rio de Janeiro, Brazil	20th (q)	Hammer throw	67.06 m
2019	World Championships	Doha, Qatar	11th	Hammer throw	70.45 m
