= Anna Bulgakova =

Russian hammer thrower

Anna Vladimirovna Bulgakova (Russian: Анна Владимировна Булгакова; born 17 January 1988 in Stavropol, Stavropol Krai) is a female hammer thrower from Russia. Her personal best throw is 73.79 metres, achieved in June 2008 in Krasnodar.

In 2017, she was given a two-year ban for breaking anti-doping regulations. In February 2019, the Court of Arbitration for Sport increased it to a four-year ban, starting from 29 March 2017 and disqualified her results retroactive from 30 June 2013 to 15 August 2015.

== International competitions ==
Representing Russia
Year	Competition	Venue	Position	Event	Result	Notes
2004	World Junior Championships	Grosseto, Italy	4th	Hammer throw	60.74 m	
2005	World Youth Championships	Marrakesh, Morocco	2nd	Hammer throw	62.05 m	
2006	World Junior Championships	Beijing, China	2nd	Hammer throw	65.73 m	
2007	European Junior Championships	Hengelo, Netherlands	4th	Hammer throw	62.14 m	
2007	Universiade	Bangkok, Thailand	6th	Hammer throw	64.83 m	
2008	Olympic Games	Beijing, China	20th (q)	Hammer throw	68.04 m	
2012	European Championships	Helsinki, Finland	3rd	Hammer throw	71.47 m	
2013	World Championships	Moscow, Russia	—	Hammer throw	74.62 m	Doping
2014	European Championships	Zürich, Switzerland	–	Hammer throw	NM	Doping

== See also ==
- List of doping cases in athletics
