= 2015 World Championships in Athletics – Women's hammer throw =

Women's hammer throw at the 2015 World Championships
- Venue: Beijing National Stadium
- Dates: 26 August (qualification); 27 August (final)
- Competitors: 31 from 21 nations
- Winning distance: 80.85 m (265 ft 3 in)

Medalists
gold medal	Anita Włodarczyk	Poland
silver medal	Zhang Wenxiu	China
bronze medal	Alexandra Tavernier	France

The women's hammer throw at the 2015 World Championships in Athletics was held at the Beijing National Stadium on 26 and 27 August.

The winning margin was 4.52 metres which as of 2024 remains the only time the women's hammer throw has been won by more than four metres at these championships, although Włodarczyk's winning margin at the Olympics the following year was greater.

The world championships also incorporated the 2015 IAAF Hammer Throw Challenge and Anita Włodarczyk was the series winner and world champion.

== Competition ==
2015 was Anita Włodarczyk's year. Already the world record holder, she threw the ball out to 81.08 less than four weeks before the championships to become the first woman to throw beyond 80 metres. Włodarczyk is the returning silver medalist and was the 2009 champion. The two-time defending champion and Olympic Champion Tatyana Lysenko, the number 3 thrower in history, did not return. No Russian athletes competed in this event. Zhang Wenxiu was the home favorite who has finished just behind Włodarczyk at every major championship (except 2011) since the Olympics were here seven years earlier.

The finals began with Włodarczyk throwing 74.40 to take the early lead in the first round. Alexandra Tavernier was close with a 74.02. In the second round, Włodarczyk threw 78.52, a distance which only three other women had ever achieved. One of those three was Betty Heidler but her 72.56 in the second round would prove to be her best effort of the day. At the end of the round Zhang threw 75.92 to move into second place. On her third throw, Włodarczyk threw 80.27, a distance only she has achieved. It was the second best throw in history. A month earlier it would have been a world record, at this meet it was only her second best throw of the day as her fourth round 80.85 set the Championship Record with a new second best throw in history. Moments before, Zhang threw her best of the day, 76.33 to solidify her hold on silver. Tavernier's first round throw held on for third, though Sophie Hitchon made a run at it with her British National Record 73.86 on her final toss.

== Records ==
Prior to the competition, the records were as follows:

World record	Anita Włodarczyk (POL)	81.08	Cetniewo, Poland	1 August 2015
Championship record	Tatyana Beloborodova (RUS)	78.80	Moscow, Russia	16 August 2013
World leading	Anita Włodarczyk (POL)	81.08	Cetniewo, Poland	1 August 2015
African record	Amy Sène (SEN)	69.70	Forbach, France	25 May 2014
Asian record	Zheng Wang (CHN)	77.68	Chengdu, China	29 March 2014
North, Central American and Caribbean record	Yipsi Moreno (CUB)	76.62	Zagreb, Croatia	9 September 2008
South American record	Jennifer Dahlgren (ARG)	73.74	Buenos Aires, Argentina	10 April 2010
European record	Anita Włodarczyk (POL)	81.08	Cetniewo, Poland	1 August 2015
Oceanian record	Bronwyn Eagles (AUS)	71.12	Adelaide, Australia	6 February 2003
The following records were established during the competition:
Championship record	Anita Włodarczyk (POL)	80.85	Beijing, China	27 August 2015

== Qualification standards ==
Entry standards
70.00

== Schedule ==
Date	Time	Round
26 August 2015	09:30	Qualification
27 August 2015	19:00	Final

All times are local times (UTC+8)

== Results ==
KEY:	Q	Qualified	q	12 best performers	NR	National record	PB	Personal best	SB	Seasonal best

=== Qualification ===
Qualification: Qualifying Performance 72.50 (Q) or at least 12 best performers (q) advanced to the final.

Rank	Group	Name	Nationality	No. 1	No. 2	No. 3	Mark	Notes
1	A	Anita Włodarczyk	Poland	75.01			75.01	Q
2	A	Alexandra Tavernier	France	74.39			74.39	Q, PB
3	A	Wang Zheng	China	69.85	73.06		73.06	Q
4	B	Zhang Wenxiu	China	72.92			72.92	Q, SB
5	B	Zalina Marghieva	Moldova	72.29	–	–	72.29	q
6	B	Amber Campbell	United States	72.06	–	–	72.06	q
7	A	Kathrin Klaas	Germany	71.38	71.41	67.81	71.41	q
8	A	Sophie Hitchon	Great Britain & N.I.	x	71.07	x	71.07	q
9	B	Betty Heidler	Germany	69.80	70.60	69.61	70.60	q
10	A	Rosa Rodríguez	Venezuela	70.57	x	x	70.57	q
11	A	Amanda Bingson	United States	66.99	x	69.99	69.99	q
12	A	Alena Sobaleva	Belarus	68.66	x	69.86	69.86	q
13	B	Sultana Frizell	Canada	69.66	67.54	69.37	69.66	
14	A	Malwina Kopron	Poland	69.53	66.13	67.85	69.53	
15	B	Yirisleydi Ford	Cuba	x	67.92	69.43	69.43	
16	B	Martina Hrašnová	Slovakia	68.80	67.28	67.63	68.80	
17	B	Joanna Fiodorow	Poland	68.72	x	x	68.72	
18	A	DeAnna Price	United States	x	x	68.69	68.69	
19	B	Réka Gyurátz	Hungary	64.94	68.26	65.37	68.26	
20	B	Kıvılcım Kaya	Turkey	67.98	x	66.98	67.98	
21	B	Jennifer Dahlgren	Argentina	66.89	67.68	x	67.68	
22	A	Liu Tingting	China	x	66.48	67.07	67.07	
23	B	Hanna Skydan	Azerbaijan	66.91	x	66.82	66.91	
24	B	Silvia Salis	Italy	64.43	x	66.80	66.80	
25	A	Marina Nichișenco	Moldova	x	66.63	x	66.63	
26	B	Tracey Andersson	Sweden	x	65.28	65.99	65.99	
27	A	Iryna Novozhylova	Ukraine	65.65	65.17	61.93	65.65	
28	A	Éva Orbán	Hungary	64.57	x	x	64.57	
29	B	Laura Redondo	Spain	62.46	63.86	63.45	63.86	
30	A	Tereza Králová	Czech Republic	61.13	61.39	x	61.39	
	B	Alena Krechyk	Belarus	x	x	x	NM	

=== Final ===
The final was started at 19:00

Rank	Name	Nationality	No. 1	No. 2	No. 3	No. 4	No. 5	No. 6	Mark	Notes
1st place, gold medalist(s)	Anita Włodarczyk	Poland	74.40	78.52	80.27	80.85	79.31	x	80.85	CR
2nd place, silver medalist(s)	Zhang Wenxiu	China	73.47	75.92	73.65	76.33	69.93	72.99	76.33	SB
3rd place, bronze medalist(s)	Alexandra Tavernier	France	74.02	69.59	x	67.83	69.93	70.60	74.02	
4	Sophie Hitchon	Great Britain & N.I.	71.20	71.44	73.65	71.06	72.10	73.86	73.86	NR
5	Wang Zheng	China	72.92	68.80	x	x	71.50	73.83	73.83	
6	Kathrin Klaas	Germany	70.61	72.72	73.13	72.65	71.64	73.18	73.18	SB
7	Betty Heidler	Germany	69.33	72.56	72.24	72.35	71.22	69.85	72.56	
8	Zalina Marghieva	Moldova	72.15	72.20	72.38	x	71.87	x	72.38	
9	Amanda Bingson	United States	72.35	68.86	x				72.35	SB
10	Alena Sobaleva	Belarus	63.52	67.80	70.09				70.09	
11	Rosa Rodríguez	Venezuela	x	x	67.78				67.78	
	Amber Campbell	United States	x	x	x				NM	
