= Sara Savatović =

Serbian track and field athlete (born 1993)

Personal information
- Born: 5 January 1993 (age 33)

Sport
- Country: Serbia
- Event: Hammer throw
- College team: Kansas State Wildcats

Achievements and titles
- Personal best(s): Hammer Throw: 66.41 NR (2015); Weight Throw: 20.66 NR (2015)
Medal record
Balkan Athletics Championships
Bronze medal – third place	2014 Pitești	Hammer Throw

Sara Savatović (born 5 January 1993) is a Serbian track and field athlete who holds Serbian records in the women's hammer throw and indoor weight throw. She is a seven-time Serbian national champion in the hammer throw.

== Career ==
Savatović began her career in 2008. She competed in the 2009 World Youth Championships in Athletics in Brixen, Italy. In January 2013, she moved to Manhattan, Kansas to compete in track and field for Kansas State University. She ended her athletic career as a three-time Big 12 Conference champion in the hammer throw and a two-time Big 12 Conference champion in the weight throw. She was the 2016 NCAA Division I Outdoor Track and Field Championships runner-up in the hammer throw.

== Personal bests ==
Outdoor	Indoor
Hammer throw – 66.41 (2015)	Weight Throw – 20.66 (2015)

== Hammer Throw Progression ==
Year	Mark	Date	Place
2009	46.63	19 September 2009	Moscow, Russia
2010	53.98	5 September 2010	Sremska Mitrovica, Serbia
2011	54.96	19 June 2011	Novi Sad, Serbia
2012	63.51	13 May 2012	Sremska Mitrovica, Serbia
2013	64.11	3 May 2013	(United States) Waco, Texas, USA
2014	65.19	27 March 2014	(United States) Austin, Texas, USA
2015	66.41	15 May 2015	(United States) Ames, Iowa, USA
2016	65.61	9 June 2016	(United States) Eugene, Oregon, USA
