= Sarah Holt =

British hammer thrower

Sarah Holt (born 17 April 1987) is a British athlete who specializes in the hammer throw, her personal best is 68.97m. She was born in Dewsbury, West Yorkshire, United Kingdom. Holt has represented Great Britain Athletics Team consistently since 2006. She began athletics at the age of 12, competing for Spenborough and District Athletics Club. She then went on to compete for Sale Harriers Manchester, her current club. Career highlights include European U23 bronze medallist (2009), Double England Champion (2011, 2012) and Commonwealth Games representative (2010). Holt attended Whitcliffe Mount School in Cleckheaton. where she had academic success, achieving straight A grades at A-Level (geography, psychology, physical education). Her academics continued at Loughborough University where she gained a BSc in Geography and Sport science (2:1).

== Career ==
=== Junior career ===
Holt began athletics at the age of 12 where she broke the UK age 12 national record, throwing 22.40m. Her training at this age was sporadic as she enjoyed participating in other sports and athletic events. In 2001/2, Holt was selected to represent England Schools, and was coached by Michael Morley. She had success at the English Schools Championships, achieving bronze, silver and gold medals (2003–2005). Holt represented Great Britain U20 team in 2006, competing at the World Junior Championships (Beijing).

In the under 23 age group Holt topped the British ranking for three years. and broke the British under 23 national record. In 2009, she threw 62.55m to gain a bronze medal in at the European under 23 Championships (Kaunas, Lithuania). Holt was also selected as team captain for these championships. Her coach at the time was John Pearson.

=== Senior career ===
Holt was first selected to represent the British senior team in 2010 at the European Team’s Championships in Bergen, Norway. She has continued her development and was a part of the European Championships team in Helsinki, Finland 2012. In addition, Holt represented England at the 2010 Commonwealth Games in Delhi. Her current coach is Robert Weir. who she has spent time training with in Eugene, Oregon, United States. Holt has improved her personal best every year since 1999.
