= Charlene Woitha =

German hammer thrower

Personal information
- Nationality: German
- Born: 21 August 1993 (age 32)
- Height: 1.78 m (5 ft 10 in)
- Weight: 77 kg (170 lb)

Sport
- Country: Germany
- Sport: Track and field
- Event: Hammer throw

Charlene Woitha (born 21 August 1993) is a German athlete who specialises in the hammer throw. She qualified for 2016 Summer Olympics. She finished in 29th place in the qualifying round and did not advance to the final.

== Personal bests ==
| Event | Record | Venue | Date |
|---|---|---|---|
| Hammer throw | 70.98 | Zeulenroda | 24 June 2016 |
