= Sophie Hitchon =

British hammer thrower

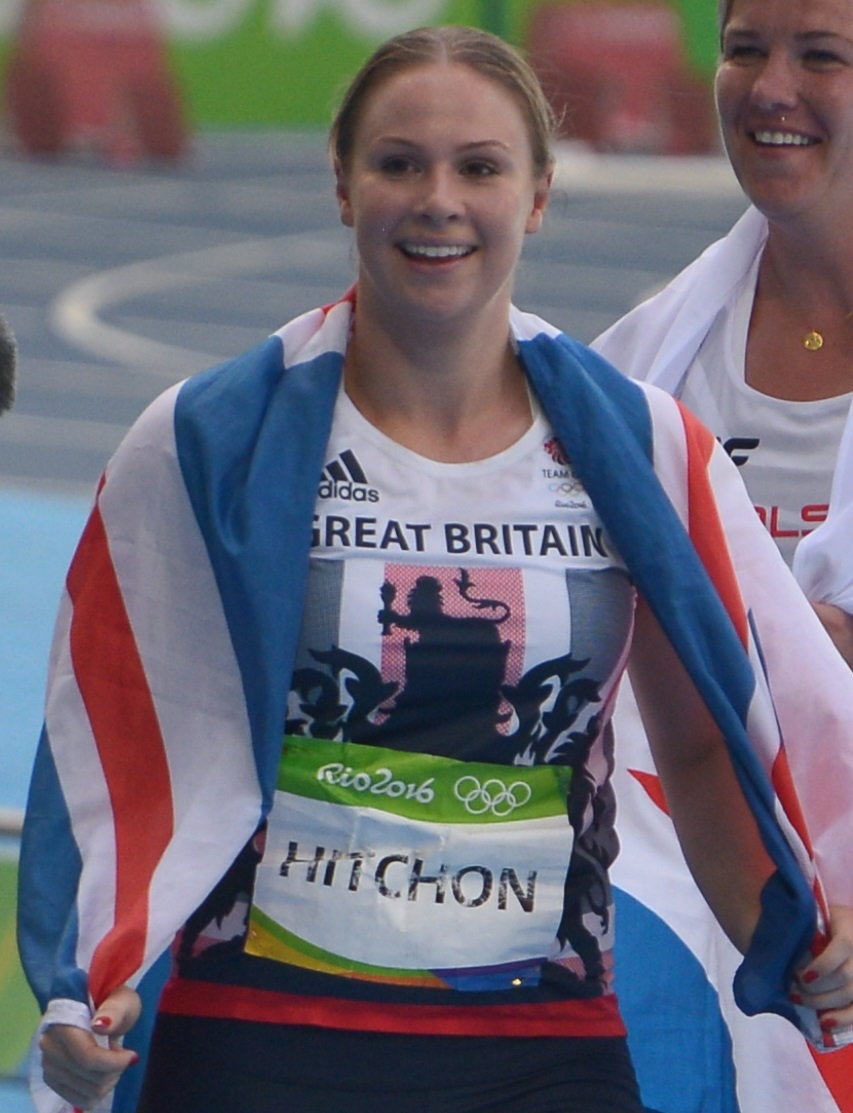
- Hitchon after winning the bronze medal at Rio 2016

Personal information
- Born: 11 July 1991 (age 35) Burnley, Lancashire, England
- Height: 1.70 m (5 ft 7 in)
- Weight: 74 kg (163 lb)

Sport
- Country: United Kingdom
- Sport: Athletics
- Event: Hammer throw
Medal record
Representing Great Britain
Olympic Games
Bronze medal – third place	2016 Rio de Janeiro	Hammer
World Hammer Challenge
Silver medal – second place	2016	Hammer
Athletics World Cup
Silver medal – second place	2018 London	Hammer
European U23 Championships
Gold medal – first place	2013 Tampere	Hammer
Bronze medal – third place	2011 Ostrava	Hammer
European U23 Throwing Cup
Silver medal – second place	2011 Sofia	Hammer
World Junior Championships
Gold medal – first place	2010 Moncton	Hammer
European Junior Championships
Bronze medal – third place	2009 Novi Sad	Hammer
Representing England
Commonwealth Games
Bronze medal – third place	2014 Glasgow	Hammer
Commonwealth Youth Games
Gold medal – first place	2008 Pune	Hammer
- Updated on 15 August 2022

Sophie Hitchon (born 11 July 1991) is a retired British hammer thrower. She is the British record-holder with a throw of 74.54 metres, set when winning the Olympic bronze medal at the 2016 Rio Games, Great Britain's first ever Olympic medal in the event. She also reached the hammer final at the 2012 London Olympics, and is the 2010 World Junior Champion, the 2013 European U23 Champion, and the 2014 Commonwealth Games bronze medallist.

== Early life ==
Hitchon was born in Burnley, Lancashire, and attended Wellfield Church Primary School, Ivy Bank Business and Enterprise College and Thomas Whitham Sixth Form. She pursued a BSc in Business and Sport Management from the University of Hertfordshire. Hitchon practiced ballet between the ages of 4 and 14 and credits it for teaching dedication to sport.

== Achievements ==
In April 2007, Hitchon set a new UK Under 17 Women's record with a throw of 49.61m at the Kingston-upon-Hull AC Open meeting. The previous record was 48.94m achieved by Frances Miller of Elgin Harriers at the 2001 IAAF World Youth Championships in Debrecen, Hungary.

In March 2008, at the age of 16, Hitchon set a new junior record with a throw of 59.74m at the UK Throws event in Birmingham, followed by a 59.49m throw at the Blackpool Open Meeting the same weekend.

In July 2009, Hitchon won bronze in the hammer at the European Junior Championships. In doing so she also improved her own national junior record to 63.18m and took Britain's first ever European Junior medal in the women's hammer.

A year later, Hitchon was captain of the UK women's team at the IAAF World Junior Championships (Moncton, Canada, 19–25 July), as well as remaining the UK junior hammer record holder.

In July 2011, Hitchon represented the UK in the European Under-23 Championships in Ostrava, Czech Republic (14–17 July), taking the bronze medal.

At the 2014 Commonwealth Games in Glasgow, Hitchon achieved a bronze medal in the women's Hammer throw with a distance of 68.72m. This was her first success at a senior level championship.

At the 2016 Rio Olympics, Hitchon achieved a bronze medal in the women's hammer throw with a distance of 74.54 metres on her sixth and final attempt, setting a new GB record in the process. It also made her the first British hammer thrower to win an Olympic medal and ended a 28-year Olympic medal drought for GB in women's field events since Fatima Whitbread's silver at Seoul in 1988.

Hitchon announced her retirement in May 2021.

== International competitions ==
Year	Competition	Venue	Position	Notes
Representing Great Britain
2007	World Youth Championships	Ostrava, Czech Republic	9th q	50.28 m
2008	World Junior Championships	Bydgoszcz, Poland	7th	58.45 m
2009	European Junior Championships	Novi Sad, Serbia	3rd	63.18 m
2010	World Junior Championships	Moncton, Canada	1st	66.01 m
2011	European U23 Championships	Ostrava, Czech Republic	3rd	69.59 m
2011	World Championships	Daegu, South Korea	13th q	64.93 m
2012	Olympic Games	London, United Kingdom	12th	69.33 m in qualifying: 71.98m - New British Record
2013	European Team Championships	Gateshead, Kingdom	3rd	72.97 m New British Record
2013	European U23 Championships	Tampere, Finland	1st	70.72 m
2015	World Championships	Beijing, China	4th	73.86 m New British Record
2016	Olympic Games	Rio de Janeiro, Brazil	3rd	74.54 m New British Record
2017	World Championships	London, United Kingdom	7th	72.32 m
2018	World Cup	London, United Kingdom	2nd	73.48 m
2018	European Championships	Berlin, Germany	8th	70.52 m
Representing England
2008	Commonwealth Youth Games	Pune, India	1st	58.43 m
2014	Commonwealth Games	Glasgow, United Kingdom	3rd	68.72 m
2018	Commonwealth Games	Gold Coast, Australia	—	NM

- q = in qualifying
