= Nikola Lomnická =

Slovak hammer thrower (born 1988)

Personal information
- Nationality: Slovak
- Born: 16 September 1988 (age 37)

Sport
- Sport: Athletics
- Event: Hammer throw
- College team: University of Georgia
- Club: Dukla Banská Bystrica
Medal record
Women's athletics
Representing Slovakia
European Games
Silver medal – second place	2015 Baku	Mixed team

Nikola Lomnická (born 16 September 1988) is a Slovak hammer thrower. She competed in the women's hammer throw at the 2017 World Championships in Athletics.

Competing for the Georgia Bulldogs women's track and field team, Lomnická won the 2010 NCAA Division I Outdoor Track and Field Championships in the hammer throw.
