= Tuğçe Şahutoğlu =

Turkish hammer thrower (born 1988)

Personal information
- Nationality: Turkish
- Born: 1 May 1988 (age 38) Mersin, Turkey
- Height: 172 cm (5 ft 8 in)
- Weight: 98 kg (216 lb)

Sport
- Country: Turkey
- Sport: Athletics
- Event: Hammer throw
- Club: Fenerbahçe Athletics
- Coached by: Muzaffer Tolun

Achievements and titles
- Personal bests: 74.17 m NR (2012)

Tuğçe Şahutoğlu (born 1 May 1988 in Mersin) is a Turkish female hammer thrower. The 1.80 m (5.9 ft) tall athlete at 115 kg (254 lb) was a member of Beşiktaş J.K. Athletics Team before she transferred to Fenerbahçe Athletics, where she is coached by Muzaffer Tolun. She was a student of physical education at the vocational college of Aksaray University.

Şahutoğlu began with hammer throw at the age of twelve promoted by her teacher of physical education. She holds records at the national level in several age categories. In May 2012, she improved her personal best from 70.09 m achieved in 2011 to 74.17 m breaking the national record that was held by Sviatlana Sudak with 70.74 m set in July 2008 at Minsk, Belarus.

Tuğçe Şahutoğlu participated in the hammer throw event at the 2012 Summer Olympics, where she finished 24th in the qualification round and failed to make the final.

Şahutoğlu tested positive for the anabolic steroid Stanozolol in May 2013 and was given a two-year ban from competition. The Turkish Athletics Federation named her in August 2013 as one of 31 Turkish athletes to have been sanctioned for a doping offence in that year. Her period of ineligibility lasted until 7 June 2015. She competed at the 2016 Summer Olympics, finishing 10th in her qualifying pool, not reaching the final.
