= 2017 European Athletics U23 Championships – Women's hammer throw =

The women's hammer throw event at the 2017 European Athletics U23 Championships was held in Bydgoszcz, Poland, at Zdzisław Krzyszkowiak Stadium on 14 and 15 July.

== Medalists ==
Gold	Alyona Shamotina; Ukraine
Silver	Camille Sainte-Luce; France
Bronze	Beatrice Nedberge Llano; Norway

== Results ==
=== Qualification ===
14 July

Qualification rule: 64.50 (Q) or the 12 best results (q) qualified for the final.

Rank	Group	Name	Nationality	#1	#2	#3	Results	Notes
1	A	Krista Tervo	Finland	x	67.98		67.98	Q
2	A	Sara Fantini	Italy	x	67.55		67.55	Q
3	B	Alyona Shamotina	Ukraine	64.09	67.42		67.42	Q
4	B	Réka Gyurátz	Hungary	62.78	67.33		67.33	Q
5	A	Anna Maria Orel	Estonia	61.07	65.39		65.39	Q
6	B	Iliana Korosidou	Greece	65.34			65.34	Q
7	A	Beatrice Nedberge Llano	Norway	63.71	65.11		65.11	Q
8	A	Katarzyna Furmanek	Poland	62.36	65.11		65.11	Q
9	A	Camille Sainte-Luce	France	63.87	64.75		64.75	Q
10	B	Sophie Gimmler	Germany	64.54			64.54	Q
11	A	Marinda Petersson	Sweden	x	61.20	63.71	63.71	q
12	A	Suvi Koskinen	Finland	x	63.60	62.56	63.60	q
13	A	Pavla Kuklová	Czech Republic	59.54	60.59	63.45	63.45	=PB
14	B	Marika Kaczmarek	Poland	60.61	62.73	60.28	62.73	
15	B	Nastassia Maslava	Belarus	59.30	60.11	62.21	62.21	
16	A	Vanessa Sterckendries	Belgium	61.75	61.44	59.76	61.75	
17	B	Helene Sofie Ingvaldsen	Norway	56.14	60.51	61.49	61.49	
18	A	Viktoriya Sakhno	Ukraine	58.80	x	61.26	61.26	
19	A	Stamatia Skarvelis	Greece	x	x	60.99	60.99	
20	B	Sina Mai Holthuijsen	Netherlands	60.77	60.21	58.50	60.77	
21	B	Inga Linna	Finland	60.57	60.43	x	60.57	
22	B	Frida Bååth	Sweden	59.55	59.34	59.68	59.68	
23	A	Osarumen Odeh	Spain	56.45	54.41	59.66	59.66	
24	B	Emma Thor	Sweden	59.47	x	x	59.47	
25	A	Agata Zienkowicz	Poland	59.36	58.74	x	59.36	
26	A	Chrystalla Kyriakou	Cyprus	55.25	51.36	57.62	57.62	
27	A	Vigdis Jónsdóttir	Iceland	x	57.40	x	57.40	
28	B	Polina Ciui	Moldova	56.29	56.60	55.71	56.60	
29	B	Aleksandra Ivanović	Serbia	x	x	54.28	54.28	
30	B	Nadia Maffo	Italy	52.81	52.67	51.79	52.81	
	B	Anamari Kožul	Croatia	x	x	x	NM	

=== Final ===
15 July

Rank	Name	Nationality	#1	#2	#3	#4	#5	#6	Result	Notes
1st place, gold medalist(s)	Alyona Shamotina	Ukraine	65.24	67.46	65.92	60.97	x	x	67.46	
2nd place, silver medalist(s)	Camille Sainte-Luce	France	64.50	66.98	64.52	64.89	64.42	65.82	66.98	
3rd place, bronze medalist(s)	Beatrice Nedberge Llano	Norway	x	63.53	65.41	66.74	64.80	65.35	66.74	
4	Réka Gyurátz	Hungary	66.67	x	66.60	66.21	x	65.42	66.67	
5	Marinda Petersson	Sweden	65.64	x	62.10	x	64.79	66.61	66.61	
6	Katarzyna Furmanek	Poland	66.13	66.07	66.45	64.95	x	64.62	66.45	
7	Iliana Korosidou	Greece	63.37	64.58	63.59	x	64.35	63.86	64.58	
8	Suvi Koskinen	Finland	64.50	x	x	63.48	61.37	61.75	64.50	
9	Krista Tervo	Finland	x	63.97	59.46				63.97	
10	Sophie Gimmler	Germany	63.79	61.27	61.89				63.79	
11	Sara Fantini	Italy	63.38	x	x				63.38	
12	Anna Maria Orel	Estonia	63.24	x	x				63.24	
