= 2013 World Youth Championships in Athletics – Girls' hammer throw =

Girls' hammer throw at the 2013 World Youth Championships in Athletics
- Venue: RSC Olimpiyskiy
- Dates: 12 July (qualification); 13 July (final)
- Competitors: 51
- Winning distance: 73.20 CR

Medalists
gold medal	Réka Gyurátz	Hungary
silver medal	Helga Völgyi	Hungary
bronze medal	Valeriya Semenkova	Ukraine

The girls' hammer throw at the 2013 World Youth Championships in Athletics was held on 12 and 13 July.

== Medalists ==
Gold	Silver	Bronze
Réka Gyurátz; Hungary	Helga Völgyi; Hungary	Valeriya Semenkova; Ukraine

== Records ==
Prior to the competition, the following records were as follows.

World Youth Best	Réka Gyurátz (HUN)	76.04	Zalaegerszeg, Hungary	23 June 2013
Championship Record	–	–	–	–
World Youth Leading	Réka Gyurátz (HUN)	76.04	Zalaegerszeg, Hungary	23 June 2013

== Qualification ==
Qualification rule: 64.50 (Q) or at least 12 best performers (q) qualified.

Rank	Group	Name	Nationality	#1	#2	#3	Result	Notes
1	A	Réka Gyurátz	Hungary	71.72			71.72	Q, CR
2	B	Katarzyna Furmanek	Poland	67.33			67.33	Q
3	B	Alexandra Hulley	Australia	58.87	63.16	67.31	67.31	Q, PB
4	B	Helga Völgyi	Hungary	x	67.05		67.05	Q
5	A	Anastasiya Maslova	Belarus	x	x	65.45	65.45	Q
6	B	Tiina Rinnekari	Finland	61.79	64.56		64.56	Q
7	B	Valeriya Semenkova	Ukraine	64.51			64.51	Q
8	B	Helene Ingvaldsen	Norway	59.21	63.46	64.41	64.41	q, PB
9	A	Audrey Ciofani	France	56.08	63.79	62.92	63.79	q
10	A	Beatrice Nedberge Llano	Norway	61.84	63.15	62.98	63.15	q, PB
11	A	Dimitra Zotou	Greece	54.80	59.28	63.13	63.13	q
12	B	Sophie Gimmler	Germany	x	61.51	63.06	63.06	q
13	A	Giulia Camporese	Italy	x	62.02	x	62.02	
14	A	Marika Kaczmarek	Poland	x	61.76	x	61.76	
15	A	Xin Yaru	China	58.93	61.29	59.29	61.29	PB
16	B	Che Yi-tzu	Chinese Taipei	x	55.97	60.94	60.94	PB
17	A	Sabrina Gaitán	Guatemala	59.22	60.47	60.93	60.93	PB
18	B	Chrystalla Kyriakou	Cyprus	60.39	58.55	x	60.39	PB
19	B	Victoria Villa	Mexico	x	x	59.98	59.98	
20	B	Rafailia Grigoriadou	Greece	58.76	59.95	57.67	59.95	
21	A	Nyla Woods	United States	x	x	59.68	59.68	
22	A	Bettina Weber	Austria	x	57.15	59.22	59.22	PB
23	B	Hanna Zayanchkouskaya	Belarus	59.01	58.74	x	59.01	
24	B	Camille Sainte-Luce	France	x	58.80	x	58.80	
25	B	Danna Restrepo	Colombia	x	x	57.92	57.92	PB
26	B	Daniela Paço	Portugal	57.56	54.84	x	57.56	
27	B	Ma Rui	China	57.47	x	x	57.47	
28	B	Elizabeth Mina	Ecuador	x	56.36	57.43	57.43	PB
29	A	Stefanie Greyling	South Africa	x	57.18	55.28	57.18	PB
30	A	Maryna Ihnatenko	Ukraine	x	55.71	56.91	56.91	
31	A	Kwon Young-hye	South Korea	56.61	x	56.38	56.61	PB
32	A	Stefani Vukajlović	Bosnia and Herzegovina	x	50.21	56.22	56.22	
33	A	Yuliya Dmitrachenkova	Russia	55.28	56.11	55.76	56.11	
34	B	Noa Ndimurwanko	Italy	55.83	55.22	54.83	55.83	
35	B	Alona Volodin	Israel	53.93	52.24	55.06	55.06	PB
36	B	Teagan Rasche	Canada	47.83	54.13	x	54.13	
37	A	Sofija Trifonova	Latvia	54.12	54.01	51.59	54.12	
38	A	Mayra Gaviria	Colombia	x	53.82	50.82	53.82	
39	A	Alice Ackers	Ireland	53.43	51.65	50.23	53.43	
40	B	Anna Maria Orel	Estonia	53.16	x	x	53.16	
41	B	Anamari Kožul	Croatia	x	52.67	53.00	53.00	
42	B	Bianca Blom	South Africa	x	52.60	49.09	52.60	
43	B	Luciana Acosta	Uruguay	x	x	52.59	52.59	PB
44	A	Courtney Neville-Rutherford	Canada	51.19	51.80	x	51.80	
45	A	Noelia Cáceres	Paraguay	x	49.66	50.04	50.04	
46	A	Lorena Rodríguez	Mexico	x	x	49.49	49.49	
47	B	Alexandra Gutiérrez	Peru	x	47.47	44.28	47.47	
48	A	Katri Karindi	Estonia	x	x	47.40	47.40	
	A	Mostafa Mohamed Esraa	Egypt	x	x	x	NM	
	B	Gabrijela Kumek	Slovenia	x	x	x	NM	
	A	Maija Valli	Finland	x	x	x	NM	

== Final ==
Rank	Name	Nationality	#1	#2	#3	#4	#5	#6	Result	Notes
1st place, gold medalist(s)	Réka Gyurátz	Hungary	70.90	73.20	x	x	72.76	71.49	73.20	CR
2nd place, silver medalist(s)	Helga Völgyi	Hungary	x	70.81	71.95	69.65	x	70.49	71.95	
3rd place, bronze medalist(s)	Valeriya Semenkova	Ukraine	x	67.55	x	68.62	67.31	x	68.62	PB
4	Beatrice Nedberge Llano	Norway	66.01	x	65.74	x	65.62	68.31	68.31	PB
5	Dimitra Zotou	Greece	63.49	67.20	x	x	66.25	66.82	67.20	PB
6	Katarzyna Furmanek	Poland	x	66.14	66.09	66.64	65.50	64.69	66.64	
7	Anastasiya Maslova	Belarus	65.40	x	61.23	x	62.68	x	65.40	
8	Helene Ingvaldsen	Norway	64.71	64.56	65.37	61.87	63.98	64.90	65.37	PB
9	Alexandra Hulley	Australia	64.06	63.13	65.35				65.35	
10	Sophie Gimmler	Germany	63.55	64.63	64.61				64.63	
11	Tiina Rinnekari	Finland	63.12	63.52	64.14				64.14	
12	Audrey Ciofani	France	62.94	x	64.08				64.08	
