= 2011 World Youth Championships in Athletics – Girls' hammer throw =

Girls' hammer throw at the 2011 World Youth Championships in Athletics
- Venue: Stadium Lille Métropole
- Dates: 8 July (qualification); 9 July (final)
- Competitors: 32
- Winning distance: 57.13 PB

Medalists
gold medal	Louisa James	Great Britain
silver medal	Malwina Kopron	Poland
bronze medal	Roxana Perie	Romania

The girls' hammer throw at the 2011 World Youth Championships in Athletics was held at the Stadium Lille Métropole on 8 and 9 July.

== Medalists ==
Gold	Silver	Bronze
Louisa James; Great Britain	Malwina Kopron; Poland	Roxana Perie; Romania

== Records ==
Prior to the competition, the following records were as follows.

World Youth Best	Zhang Wenxiu (CHN)	70.60	Nanning, China	5 April 2003
Championship Record	Bianca Perie (ROU)	64.61	Ostrava, Czech Republic	14 July 2007
World Youth Leading	Hanna Zinchuk (BLR)	60.11	Minsk, Belarus	16 February 2011

== Qualification ==
Qualification rule: qualification standard 55.50 m or at least best 12 qualified.

=== Group A ===
Rank	Name	Nationality	#1	#2	#3	Result	Notes
1	Heli Rinnekari	Finland	53.30	x	56.21	56.21	Q
2	Roxana Perie	Romania	x	53.62	55.86	55.86	Q, PB
3	Louisa James	Great Britain	x	x	55.20	55.20	q
4	Adrienn Kovács	Hungary	x	54.66	53.73	54.66	q
5	Petra Jakeljić	Croatia	x	53.53	x	53.53	q
6	Maria Grammatikaki	Greece	x	53.47	x	53.47	q
7	Malwina Kopron	Poland	50.34	50.85	53.42	53.42	q
8	María Barbaño	Spain	52.90	50.79	x	52.90	
9	Hanna Zinchuk	Belarus	x	52.73	48.75	52.73	
10	Yolanda González	Mexico	49.37	50.57	52.31	52.31	PB
11	Aya Ibrahim	Egypt	x	49.87	50.22	50.22	
12	Yan Mengchen	China	44.38	45.65	46.63	46.63	
13	Keyla Luna	Peru	x	45.49	x	45.49	
14	Paola Miranda	Paraguay	43.93	x	x	43.93	
15	Raphaëlle Rolnin	France	x	3.94	x	3.94	
	Vanessa Pfeifer	Germany	x	x	x	NM	

=== Group B ===
Rank	Name	Nationality	#1	#2	#3	Result	Notes
1	Hanna Bryl	Belarus	x	53.05	54.88	54.88	q
2	Kimberley Reed	Great Britain	x	54.62	x	54.62	q, PB
3	Alyona Shamotina	Ukraine	51.83	x	54.48	54.48	q
4	Sanni Saarinen	Finland	48.20	54.13	x	54.13	q
5	Beatrix Banga	Hungary	50.68	x	53.41	53.41	q
6	Danielle McConnell	Australia	49.89	51.68	53.21	53.21	
7	Margot Dubois	France	52.65	52.70	49.22	52.70	
8	Constanza Ávila	Chile	50.67	49.89	x	50.67	
9	Mona Ekroll Jaidi	Norway	50.32	x	x	50.32	
10	Giulia Rossetti	Italy	x	50.28	x	50.28	
11	Liu Miao	China	49.00	x	49.30	49.30	SB
12	Claudia Štravs	Slovenia	x	49.27	x	49.27	
13	Nabiha Guaddah	Tunisia	48.90	x	x	48.90	
14	Iliana Korosidou	Greece	x	48.47	x	48.47	
15	Ana Vásquez	Peru	43.92	47.24	48.12	48.12	
16	Menatalla Alaa	Egypt	x	43.24	41.68	43.24	

== Final ==
Rank	Name	Nationality	#1	#2	#3	#4	#5	#6	Result	Notes
1st place, gold medalist(s)	Louisa James	Great Britain	55.79	57.13	54.07	x	49.49	x	57.13	PB
2nd place, silver medalist(s)	Malwina Kopron	Poland	57.03	x	53.78	x	55.08	x	57.03	PB
3rd place, bronze medalist(s)	Roxana Perie	Romania	56.75	55.60	x	54.93	x	x	56.75	PB
4	Petra Jakeljić	Croatia	x	54.83	54.86	56.62	55.61	53.22	56.62	
5	Heli Rinnekari	Finland	54.58	53.69	x	56.01	29.60	x	56.01	
6	Beatrix Banga	Hungary	54.39	x	x	x	x	55.04	55.04	
7	Hanna Bryl	Belarus	53.90	x	x	x	54.58	x	54.58	
8	Alyona Shamotina	Ukraine	53.87	51.63	x	x	53.18	x	53.87	
9	Adrienn Kovács	Hungary	53.53	x	53.06				53.53	
10	Kimberley Reed	Great Britain	53.05	x	50.71				53.05	
11	Maria Grammatikaki	Greece	52.53	x	50.20				52.53	
12	Sanni Saarinen	Finland	52.07	x	48.61				52.07	
