= 2019 European Athletics U23 Championships – Women's hammer throw =

The women's hammer throw event at the 2019 European Athletics U23 Championships was held in Gävle, Sweden, at Gavlehov Stadium Park on 11 and 12 July.

== Medalists ==
Gold	Silver	Bronze
Sofiya Palkina; Authorised Neutral Athletes	Nastassia Maslava; Belarus	Sara Fantini; Italy

== Records ==
Prior to the competition, the records were as follows:

European U23 record	Tatyana Beloborodova (RUS)	77.06	Moscow, Russia	15 July 2005
Championship U23 record	Alexandra Tavernier (FRA)	72.98	Tallinn, Estonia	10 July 2015

== Results ==
The qualification will be held on July 11 at 10:30 and 11:35.

Qualification rule: 64.00 (Q) or the 12 best results (q) qualified for the final.

Rank	Group	Name	Nationality	#1	#2	#3	Results	Notes
1	B	Sofiya Palkina	Authorised Neutral Athletes	66.84			66.84	Q
2	A	Sara Fantini	Italy	65.45			65.45	Q
3	A	Grete Ahlberg	Sweden	65.27			65.27	Q
4	B	Aleksandra Śmiech	Poland	57.65	64.92		64.92	Q
5	B	Krista Tervo	Finland	x	62.32	63.33	63.33	q
6	A	Nastassia Maslava	Belarus	58.38	x	61.60	61.60	q
7	A	Kiira Väänänen	Finland	60.60	x	61.54	61.54	q
8	A	Anastasiya Borodulina	Authorised Neutral Athletes	x	56.03	61.35	61.35	q
9	A	Frida Bååth	Sweden	59.42	60.71	59.67	60.71	q
10	B	Yuliya Kysylyova	Ukraine	55.29	60.42	x	60.42	q
11	B	Emma Thor	Sweden	60.05	59.12	60.26	60.26	q
12	B	Kateřina Skýpalová	Czech Republic	60.11	56.69	x	60.11	q
13	B	Deniz Yaylacı	Turkey	53.99	58.09	59.49	59.49	
14	A	Nino Tsikvadze	Georgia	x	59.04	55.50	59.04	
15	B	Michaela Walsh	Ireland	52.87	58.01	57.30	58.01	
16	A	Adéla Korečková	Czech Republic	56.76	x	x	56.76	
	A	Patrycja Maciejewska	Poland	x	x	x	NM	

=== Final ===
12 July

Rank	Name	Nationality	#1	#2	#3	#4	#5	#6	Result	Notes
1st place, gold medalist(s)	Sofiya Palkina	Authorised Neutral Athletes	70.13	69.19	71.08	68.75	69.36	x	71.08	
2nd place, silver medalist(s)	Nastassia Maslava	Belarus	69.36	x	64.45	x	x	x	69.36	SB
3rd place, bronze medalist(s)	Sara Fantini	Italy	x	67.04	63.49	68.35	x	x	68.35	
4	Aleksandra Śmiech	Poland	59.97	62.07	66.87	62.40	x	64.61	66.87	PB
5	Grete Ahlberg	Sweden	x	56.22	62.90	65.88	63.46	55.80	65.88	
6	Krista Tervo	Finland	63.55	63.68	x	x	63.33	63.82	63.82	
7	Emma Thor	Sweden	x	x	63.10	x	x	60.38	63.10	
8	Frida Bååth	Sweden	56.04	61.48	62.57	61.56	x	56.88	62.57	
9	Kiira Väänänen	Finland	x	62.07	59.12				62.07	
10	Anastasiya Borodulina	Authorised Neutral Athletes	x	62.06	60.35				62.06	
11	Yuliya Kysylyova	Ukraine	58.08	61.76	60.33				61.76	
12	Kateřina Skýpalová	Czech Republic	60.56	56.51	59.85				60.56	
