= 2014 World Junior Championships in Athletics – Women's hammer throw =

The women's hammer throw event at the 2014 World Junior Championships in Athletics was held in Eugene, Oregon, USA, at Hayward Field on 22 and 23 July.

== Medalists ==
Gold	Al'ona Shamotina; Ukraine
Silver	Réka Gyurátz; Hungary
Bronze	Iliána Korosídou; Greece

== Results ==
=== Final ===
23 July
Start time: 17:26 Temperature: 18 °C Humidity: 64 %
End time: 18:32 Temperature: 18 °C Humidity: 56 %

Rank	Name	Nationality	Attempts						Result	Notes
Rank	Name	Nationality	1	2	3	4	5	6	Result	Notes
1st place, gold medalist(s)	Al'ona Shamotina	Ukraine	65.44	x	x	62.73	66.05	63.21	66.05	
2nd place, silver medalist(s)	Réka Gyurátz	Hungary	64.68	63.33	63.75	x	64.07	62.15	64.68	
3rd place, bronze medalist(s)	Iliána Korosídou	Greece	56.28	61.09	62.33	62.17	61.57	63.67	63.67	
4	Audrey Ciofani	France	62.31	62.32	63.30	62.04	x	62.22	63.30	PB
5	Beatrice Nedberge Llano	Norway	61.05	62.13	60.64	x	63.23	61.85	63.23	
6	Zsófia Bácskay	Hungary	61.81	62.51	62.50	x	60.00	x	62.51	
7	Katarzyna Furmanek	Poland	60.02	61.91	x	61.22	61.93	x	61.93	
8	Vanessa Sterckendries	Belgium	x	61.63	60.04	x	x	x	61.63	NJR
9	Marinda Petersson	Sweden	x	60.47	55.44				60.47	
10	Kimberley Reed	United Kingdom	59.96	60.17	x				60.17	
11	Emma O'Hara	Ireland	53.15	55.80	56.28				56.28	
12	Sophie Gimmler	Germany	55.32	55.50	x				55.50	

=== Qualifications ===
22 July
With qualifying standard of 59.50 (Q) or at least the 12 best performers (q) advance to the Final

==== Summary ====
Rank	Name	Nationality	Result	Notes
1	Al'ona Shamotina	Ukraine	64.78	Q
2	Réka Gyurátz	Hungary	63.73	Q
3	Beatrice Nedberge Llano	Norway	63.67	Q NJR
4	Iliána Korosídou	Greece	62.68	Q
5	Audrey Ciofani	France	62.48	Q
6	Marinda Petersson	Sweden	61.97	Q PB
7	Katarzyna Furmanek	Poland	61.13	Q
8	Zsófia Bácskay	Hungary	60.74	Q
9	Vanessa Sterckendries	Belgium	60.09	Q
10	Kimberley Reed	United Kingdom	58.57	q
11	Sophie Gimmler	Germany	57.35	q
12	Emma O'Hara	Ireland	57.17	q
13	Petra Jakeljić	Croatia	56.90	
14	Alessandra Wall	Sweden	56.72	
15	Helene Sofie Ingvaldsen	Norway	56.63	
16	Elianne Despaigne	Cuba	56.50	
17	Inga Linna	Finland	56.38	
18	Sabrina Denise Gaitán	Guatemala	56.31	
19	Anna Maria Orel	Estonia	55.87	
20	Roxana Perie	Romania	55.83	
21	Brooke Andersen	United States	54.64	
22	Hanna Zayanchkouskaya	Belarus	54.42	
23	Pavla Kuklová	Czech Republic	53.84	
24	Diana Nusupbekova	Kazakhstan	53.27	
25	Adriana Nataly Ojeda	Ecuador	52.57	
26	Giulia Camporese	Italy	52.56	
	Haley Showalter-Stevens	United States	NM	

==== Details ====
With qualifying standard of 59.50 (Q) or at least the 12 best performers (q) advance to the Final

===== Group A =====
23 July
Start time; 17:30 Temperature: 26 °C Humidity: 39 %
End time: 18:07 Temperature: 26 °C Humidity: 39 %

Rank	Name	Nationality	Attempts			Result	Notes
Rank	Name	Nationality	1	2	3	Result	Notes
1	Réka Gyurátz	Hungary	x	63.73		63.73	Q
2	Beatrice Nedberge Llano	Norway	55.07	63.67		63.67	Q NJR
3	Iliána Korosídou	Greece	62.68			62.68	Q
4	Audrey Ciofani	France	62.48			62.48	Q
5	Vanessa Sterckendries	Belgium	60.09			60.09	Q
6	Sophie Gimmler	Germany	57.13	57.28	57.35	57.35	q
7	Emma O'Hara	Ireland	55.51	57.17	x	57.17	q
8	Alessandra Wall	Sweden	x	56.72	56.52	56.72	
9	Inga Linna	Finland	56.38	x	54.62	56.38	
10	Anna Maria Orel	Estonia	55.87	53.26	52.34	55.87	
11	Brooke Andersen	United States	x	54.64	x	54.64	
12	Hanna Zayanchkouskaya	Belarus	x	x	54.42	54.42	
13	Diana Nusupbekova	Kazakhstan	49.43	53.27	53.00	53.27	

===== Group B =====
23 July
Start time; 18:56 Temperature: 27 °C Humidity: 39 %
End time: 19:31 Temperature: 26 °C Humidity: 42 %

Rank	Name	Nationality	Attempts			Result	Notes
Rank	Name	Nationality	1	2	3	Result	Notes
1	Al'ona Shamotina	Ukraine	64.78			64.78	Q
2	Marinda Petersson	Sweden	x	61.97		61.97	Q PB
3	Katarzyna Furmanek	Poland	x	61.13		61.13	Q
4	Zsófia Bácskay	Hungary	60.74			60.74	Q
5	Kimberley Reed	United Kingdom	57.69	56.53	58.57	58.57	q
6	Petra Jakeljić	Croatia	56.52	56.90	56.15	56.90	
7	Helene Sofie Ingvaldsen	Norway	56.18	56.53	56.63	56.63	
8	Elianne Despaigne	Cuba	x	x	56.50	56.50	
9	Sabrina Denise Gaitán	Guatemala	54.02	53.12	56.31	56.31	
10	Roxana Perie	Romania	55.51	x	55.83	55.83	
11	Pavla Kuklová	Czech Republic	x	x	53.84	53.84	
12	Adriana Nataly Ojeda	Ecuador	52.44	52.43	52.57	52.57	
13	Giulia Camporese	Italy	x	x	52.56	52.56	
	Haley Showalter-Stevens	United States	x	x	x	NM	

== Participation ==
According to an unofficial count, 27 athletes from 23 countries participated in the event.

- Belarus (1)
- Belgium (1)
- Croatia (1)
- Cuba (1)
- Czech Republic (1)
- Ecuador (1)
- Estonia (1)
- Finland (1)
- France (1)
- Germany (1)
- Greece (1)
- Guatemala (1)
- Hungary (2)
- Ireland (1)
- Italy (1)
- Kazakhstan (1)
- Norway (2)
- Poland (1)
- Romania (1)
- Sweden (2)
- Ukraine (1)
- United Kingdom (1)
- United States (2)
