= 2015 World Youth Championships in Athletics – Girls' hammer throw =

Girls' hammer throw at the 2015 World Youth Championships in Athletics
- Venue: Estadio Olímpico Pascual Guerrero
- Dates: 17–18 July
- Competitors: 20 from 16 nations
- Winning distance: 67.82

Medalists
gold medal	Sofiya Palkina	Russia
silver medal	Deniz Yaylacı	Turkey
bronze medal	Shang Ningyu	China

The girls' hammer throw at the 2015 World Youth Championships in Athletics was held at the Estadio Olímpico Pascual Guerrero in Cali, Colombia from 17 to 18 July 2015.

== Records ==
Prior to the competition, the following records were as follows.

World Youth Best	Réka Gyurátz (HUN)	76.04	Zalaegerszeg, Hungary	23 June 2013
Championship Record	Réka Gyurátz (HUN)	73.20	Donetsk, Ukraine	13 July 2013
World Youth Leading	Sofiya Palkina (RUS)	71.68	Armavir, Russia	23 February 2015

== Results ==
=== Qualification ===
With qualifying standard of 63.00 (Q) or at least the 12 best performers (q) advance to the final.

Rank	Group	Name	Nationality	1	2	3	Mark	Notes
1	B	Mélissa Coquillas	France	66.75			66.75	Q, PB
2	A	Sofiya Palkina	Russia	65.50			65.50	Q
3	A	Shang Ningyu	China	64.90			64.90	Q
4	B	Anastasiya Borodulina	Russia	60.69	x	64.89	64.89	Q
5	A	Deniz Yaylacı	Turkey	62.25	63.78		63.78	Q
6	B	Ayamey Medina	Cuba	63.49			63.49	Q
7	A	Michaela Walsh	Ireland	4.85	60.58	61.71	61.71	q
8	A	Dorleta Armendariz	Spain	55.27	60.35	59.79	60.35	q
9	B	Eszter Németh	Hungary	53.89	58.17	58.77	58.77	q
10	B	Alessia Beneduce	Italy	58.60	58.58	58.68	58.68	q
11	A	Eva Mustafić	Croatia	55.60	x	57.38	57.38	q
12	B	Araceli Nahuel	Argentina	x	x	57.32	57.32	q, SB
13	A	Lindsey Frederiksen	Canada	x	x	56.62	56.62	
14	A	Mariana García	Chile	x	55.71	x	55.71	
15	B	Blanca López	Spain	x	55.45	55.00	55.45	
16	B	Chanell Botsis	Canada	x	54.10	54.54	54.54	
17	B	Grete Ahlberg	Sweden	x	52.89	x	52.89	
18	A	Ana Fernandes	Portugal	51.31	x	4.14	51.31	
19	A	Leydy Quiñones	Colombia	x	x	49.24	49.24	
–	B	Yao Kailun	China	x	x	x	NM	

=== Final ===
Rank	Name	Nationality	1	2	3	4	5	6	Mark	Notes
1st place, gold medalist(s)	Sofiya Palkina	Russia	59.85	66.77	67.82	x	60.70	65.79	67.82	
2nd place, silver medalist(s)	Deniz Yaylacı	Turkey	65.56	59.12	57.83	63.07	65.51	67.01	67.01	PB
3rd place, bronze medalist(s)	Shang Ningyu	China	65.88	59.82	66.84	x	x	65.09	66.84	PB
4	Mélissa Coquillas	France	66.55	62.94	x	x	x	x	66.55	
5	Ayamey Medina	Cuba	x	62.15	54.72	x	59.03	62.96	62.96	
6	Eva Mustafić	Croatia	x	x	57.23	52.79	59.41	x	59.41	
7	Eszter Németh	Hungary	58.16	x	55.73	56.54	58.64	58.21	58.64	
8	Alessia Beneduce	Italy	55.46	57.02	x	x	58.28	58.36	58.36	
9	Dorleta Armendariz	Spain	54.68	x	x				54.68	
10	Michaela Walsh	Ireland	x	52.73	3.80				52.73	
11	Araceli Nahuel	Argentina	x	x	52.02				52.02	
–	Anastasiya Borodulina	Russia	x	x	x				NM	
