= Athletics at the 2010 Summer Youth Olympics – Girls' hammer throw =

Athletics – girls' 100 hammer throw at the I Summer Youth Olympic Games
- Venue: Bishan Stadium
- Date: August 19–23
- Competitors: 17 from 17 nations

Medalists
1st place, gold medalist(s)		Alexia Sedykh	France
2nd place, silver medalist(s)		Alena Navahrodskaya	Belarus
3rd place, bronze medalist(s)		Xia Youlian	China

The girls' hammer throw event at the 2010 Youth Olympic Games was held on 19–23 August 2010 in Bishan Stadium.

== Schedule ==
Date	Time	Round
19 August 2010	10:45	Qualification
23 August 2010	09:00	Final

== Results ==
=== Qualification ===
Rank	Athlete	1	2	3	4	Result	Notes	Q
1	Alena Navahrodskaya (BLR)	x	59.39	x	56.30	59.39	PB	FA
2	Alexia Sedykh (FRA)	58.02	58.90	58.00	59.02	59.02		FA
3	Shelby Ashe (USA)	57.33	55.64	58.01	x	58.01		FA
4	Xia Youlian (CHN)	x	x	58.00	x	58.00		FA
5	Agapi Proskynitpoulou (GRE)	x	54.68	55.60	56.60	56.60		FA
6	Sandra Malinowska (POL)	55.30	54.45	x	x	55.30		FA
7	Bianca Lazar Fazecas (ROU)	55.06	x	53.13	x	55.06		FA
8	Fruzsina Fertig (HUN)	x	53.91	53.84	x	53.91		FA
9	Junia Koivu (FIN)	50.94	50.92	51.14	x	51.14		FA
10	Francesca Massobrio (ITA)	46.59	50.73	50.31	49.55	50.73		FB
11	Julia Ratcliffe (NZL)	x	x	50.41	46.83	50.41		FB
12	Louisa James (GBR)	x	x	49.94	x	49.94		FB
13	Marianne Fuentes Diaz (CUB)	x	48.89	x	x	48.89		FB
14	Jennifer Nevado (ESP)	48.65	46.00	47.19	45.88	48.65		FB
15	Paola Miranda (PAR)	47.72	47.39	x	47.16	47.72		FB
16	Ashrakt Metwaly (EGY)	45.77	x	x	45.19	45.77		FB
17	Nabiha Gueddah (TUN)	x	42.72	43.92	x	43.92		FB

=== Finals ===
==== Final B ====
Rank	Athlete	1	2	3	4	Result	Notes
1	Louisa James (GBR)	52.81	53.21	52.96	52.85	53.21	
2	Julia Ratcliffe (NZL)	x	50.49	x	50.08	50.49	
3	Marianne Fuentes Diaz (CUB)	x	x	x	49.59	49.59	
4	Jennifer Nevado (ESP)	x	48.03	48.55	46.73	48.55	
5	Francesca Massobrio (ITA)	x	x	47.85	48.43	48.43	
6	Nabiha Gueddah (TUN)	47.95	47.05	45.27	x	47.95	
	Ashrakt Metwaly (EGY)					DNS	
	Paola Miranda (PAR)					DNS	

==== Final A ====
Rank	Athlete	1	2	3	4	Result	Notes
1st place, gold medalist(s)	Alexia Sedykh (FRA)	x	x	59.08	x	59.08	
2nd place, silver medalist(s)	Alena Navahrodskaya (BLR)	53.39	x	56.02	57.34	57.34	
3rd place, bronze medalist(s)	Xia Youlian (CHN)	55.38	55.88	54.38	56.62	56.62	
4	Sandra Malinowska (POL)	52.69	x	x	50.55	52.69	
5	Junia Koivu (FIN)	51.41	52.19	x	x	52.19	
6	Bianca Lazar Fazecas (ROU)	x	x	43.07	51.28	51.28	
7	Fruzsina Fertig (HUN)	x	51.01	49.73	x	51.01	
8	Shelby Ashe (USA)	x	49.16	x	48.63	49.16	
9	Agapi Proskynitopoulou (GRE)	x	48.76	47.98	48.29	48.76	
