= Kimberly Reed (disambiguation) =

Kimberly Reed can refer to:

- Kimberly Reed, American documentary filmmaker
- Kimberly A. Reed, American lawyer
- Kimberley Reed, Scottish athlete
