= 2016 IAAF World U20 Championships – Women's hammer throw =

The women's hammer throw event at the 2016 IAAF World U20 Championships was held at Zdzisław Krzyszkowiak Stadium on 21 and 23 July.

== Medalists ==
| Gold | Beatrice Nedberge Llano; Norway |
| Silver | Alexandra Hulley; Australia |
| Bronze | Suvi Koskinen; Finland |

== Records ==
Standing records prior to the 2016 IAAF World U20 Championships in Athletics
| World Junior Record | Zhang Wenxiu (CHN) | 73.24 | Changsha, China | 24 June 2005 |
| Championship Record | Alexandra Tavernier (FRA) | 70.62 | Barcelona, Spain | 14 July 2012 |
| World Junior Leading | Ayamey Medina (CUB) | 68.98 | Havana, Spain | 27 May 2016 |

== Results ==
=== Qualification ===
Qualification: 61.50 (Q) or at least 12 best performers (q) qualified for the final.

| Rank | Group | Name | Nationality | #1 | #2 | #3 | Result | Note |
|---|---|---|---|---|---|---|---|---|
| 1 | A | Krista Tervo | Finland | 56.65 | 58.86 | 64.63 | 64.63 | Q |
| 2 | A | Beatrice Nedberge Llano | Norway | 57.71 | 63.60 | | 63.60 | Q |
| 3 | B | Suvi Koskinen | Finland | 62.67 | | | 62.67 | Q, SB |
| 4 | B | Alexandra Hulley | Australia | 62.65 | | | 62.65 | Q |
| 5 | B | Sara Fantini | Italy | 61.62 | | | 61.62 | Q |
| 6 | A | Emma Thor | Sweden | x | x | 61.33 | 61.33 | q, SB |
| 7 | B | Grete Ahlberg | Sweden | 59.62 | 61.01 | x | 61.01 | q |
| 8 | B | Ayamey Medina | Cuba | x | 59.84 | x | 59.84 | q |
| 9 | A | Kinga Łepkowska | Poland | 59.01 | 59.79 | 59.46 | 59.79 | q |
| 10 | B | Anastasiya Maslova | Belarus | x | 59.52 | 58.31 | 59.52 | q |
| 11 | B | Shang Ningyu | China | 59.03 | x | 56.73 | 59.03 | q |
| 12 | A | Mayra Gaviria | Colombia | 58.87 | x | 58.06 | 58.87 | q |
| 13 | A | Xu Xinying | China | 57.44 | 58.71 | x | 58.71 | |
| 14 | A | Michelle Döpke | Germany | 57.96 | 58.30 | 58.63 | 58.63 | |
| 15 | B | Sade Olatoye | United States | x | 55.61 | 58.52 | 58.52 | |
| 16 | A | Lucia Prinetti Anzalapaya | Italy | 54.90 | 58.27 | 57.30 | 58.27 | |
| 17 | B | Viktoriia Sakhno | Ukraine | 57.85 | x | 53.61 | 57.85 | |
| 18 | A | Joy McArthur | United States | 57.04 | x | x | 57.04 | |
| 19 | A | Deniz Yaylacı | Turkey | 56.72 | x | x | 56.72 | |
| 20 | A | Eva Mustafić | Croatia | 56.44 | 55.32 | 56.61 | 56.61 | |
| 21 | A | Viktoriia Holda | Ukraine | 56.35 | 56.06 | x | 56.35 | |
| 22 | B | Nadějná Skypalová | Czech Republic | x | 55.55 | 18.17 | 55.55 | |
| 23 | B | Lauren Bruce | New Zealand | x | 55.17 | x | 55.17 | |
| 24 | B | Camryn Rogers | Canada | x | 53.58 | x | 53.58 | |
| 25 | B | Polina Ciui | Moldova | 53.57 | 51.76 | 52.57 | 53.57 | |
| 26 | A | Mariana García | Chile | x | x | 49.79 | 49.79 | |

=== Final ===
| Rank | Name | Nationality | #1 | #2 | #3 | #4 | Result | Note |
|---|---|---|---|---|---|---|---|---|
| 1st place, gold medalist(s) | Beatrice Nedberge Llano | Norway | 62.30 | 63.55 | 63.81 | 64.33 | 64.33 | |
| 2nd place, silver medalist(s) | Alexandra Hulley | Australia | x | 63.47 | 57.68 | 62.47 | 63.47 | |
| 3rd place, bronze medalist(s) | Suvi Koskinen | Finland | 62.49 | x | x | x | 62.49 | |
| 4 | Krista Tervo | Finland | x | 60.09 | x | 62.25 | 62.25 | |
| 5 | Mayra Gaviria | Colombia | 59.68 | x | x | 62.18 | 62.18 | NU20R |
| 6 | Kinga Łepkowska | Poland | x | 59.73 | 60.86 | 59.46 | 60.86 | PB |
| 7 | Sara Fantini | Italy | 59.56 | x | x | | 59.56 | |
| 8 | Grete Ahlberg | Sweden | 57.50 | 58.65 | 58.43 | | 58.65 | |
| 9 | Shang Ningyu | China | 57.95 | 58.30 | x | | 58.30 | |
| 10 | Ayamey Medina | Cuba | x | x | 58.27 | | 58.27 | |
| 11 | Emma Thor | Sweden | x | 55.34 | x | | 55.34 | |
| 12 | Anastasiya Maslova | Belarus | x | x | x | | NM | |
