= Mayra Gaviria =

Colombian hammer thrower (born 1997)

Personal information
- Full name: Mayra Alexandra Gaviria Maldonado
- Born: May 26, 1997 (age 29) Florencia, Colombia
- Height: 1.70 m (5 ft 7 in)
- Weight: 78 kg (172 lb)

Sport
- Country: Colombia
- Sport: Athletics
- Event: Hammer throw

Achievements and titles
- Personal best: Hammer throw: 68.76 m (2026)
Medal record
Representing Colombia
Women's athletics
Event	1st	2nd	3rd
Ibero-American Championships	0	1	2
CAC Games	1	0	1
South American Games	1	1	0
South American Championships	0	1	1
Bolivarian Games	0	2	0
Pan American U20 Championships	0	0	1
South American Youth Games	1	0	0
South American U23 Championships	2	0	0
South American U18 Championships	1	0	0
Total	6	5	5
Ibero-American Championships
Silver medal – second place	2026 Lima	Hammer throw
Bronze medal – third place	2022 Alicante	Hammer throw
Bronze medal – third place	2024 Cuiabá	Hammer throw
Central American and Caribbean Games
Gold medal – first place	2026 Santo Domingo	Hammer throw
Bronze medal – third place	2023 San Salvador	Hammer throw
South American Games
Gold medal – first place	2026 Santa Fe	Hammer throw
Silver medal – second place	2022 Asunción	Hammer throw
South American Championships
Silver medal – second place	2023 São Paulo	Hammer throw
Bronze medal – third place	2021 Guayaquil	Hammer throw
Bolivarian Games
Silver medal – second place	2022 Valledupar	Hammer throw
Silver medal – second place	2025 Lima-Ayacucho	Hammer throw
Pan American U20 Championships
Bronze medal – third place	2015 Edmonton	Hammer throw
South American Youth Games
Gold medal – first place	2013 Lima	Hammer throw
South American U23 Championships
Gold medal – first place	2016 Lima	Hammer throw
Gold medal – first place	2018 Cuenca	Hammer throw
South American U18 Championships
Gold medal – first place	2014 Cali	Hammer throw
- Updated on 16 March 2026

Mayra Alexandra Gaviria Maldonado (born 26 May 1997) is a Colombian athlete specialising in the hammer throw. She represented her country at the 2024 Summer Olympics but withdrew from competition after the first qualifying throw.

Her personal best in the event is 68.76 metres set in Bogotá in 2026.

== International competitions ==
Year	Competition	Venue	Position	Event	Notes
Representing Colombia
2013	World U18 Championships	Donetsk, Ukraine	38th (q)	Hammer throw (3 kg)	53.82 m
2013	South American Youth Games	Lima, Peru	1st	Hammer throw (3 kg)	58.54 m
2013	South American U20 Championships	Resistencia, Argentina	7th	Hammer throw	47.93 m
2014	Youth Olympic Games	Nanjing, China	11th	Hammer throw (3 kg)	57.50 m
2014	South American U18 Championships	Cali, Colombia	1st	Hammer throw (3 kg)	64.94 m CR
2015	Pan American U20 Championships	Edmonton, Canada	3rd	Hammer throw	57.78 m
2016	Ibero-American Championships	Rio de Janeiro, Brazil	4th	Hammer throw	57.35 m
2016	World U20 Championships	Bydgoszcz, Poland	5th	Hammer throw	62.18 m NU20R
2016	South American U23 Championships	Lima, Peru	1st	Hammer throw	61.55 m
2017	South American Championships	Asunción, Paraguay	4th	Hammer throw	61.21 m
2017	World University Games	Taipei, Taiwan	—N/a	Hammer throw	NM
2018	South American U23 Championships	Cuenca, Ecuador	1st	Hammer throw	62.10 m
2019	South American Championships	Lima, Peru	5th	Hammer throw	63.92 m
2021	South American Championships	Guayaquil, Ecuador	3rd	Hammer throw	62.46 m
2022	Ibero-American Championships	La Nucia, Spain	3rd	Hammer throw	64.44 m
2022	Bolivarian Games	Valledupar, Colombia	2nd	Hammer throw	64.93 m
2022	South American Games	Asunción, Paraguay	2nd	Hammer throw	65.40 m
2023	Central American and Caribbean Games	San Salvador, El Salvador	3rd	Hammer throw	68.61 m
2023	South American Championships	São Paulo, Brazil	2nd	Hammer throw	67.07 m
2023	World Championships	Budapest, Hungary	32nd (q)	Hammer throw	66.82 m
2023	Pan American Games	Santiago, Chile	4th	Hammer throw	64.42 m
2024	Ibero-American Championships	Cuiabá, Brazil	3rd	Hammer throw	66.92 m
2024	Olympic Games	Paris, France	—N/a	Hammer throw	NM
2025	Bolivarian Games	Lima, Peru	2nd	Hammer throw	68.06 m
2026	Ibero-American Championships	Lima, Peru	2nd	Hammer throw	66.20 m
2026	Pan American Championships	Medellín, Colombia	4th	Hammer throw	68.62 m
2026	Central American and Caribbean Games	Santo Domingo, Dominican Republic	1st	Hammer throw	67.59 m
2026	South American Games	Santa Fe, Argentina	1st	Hammer throw	66.35 m
