= Vanessa Sterckendries =

Belgian athletics competitor

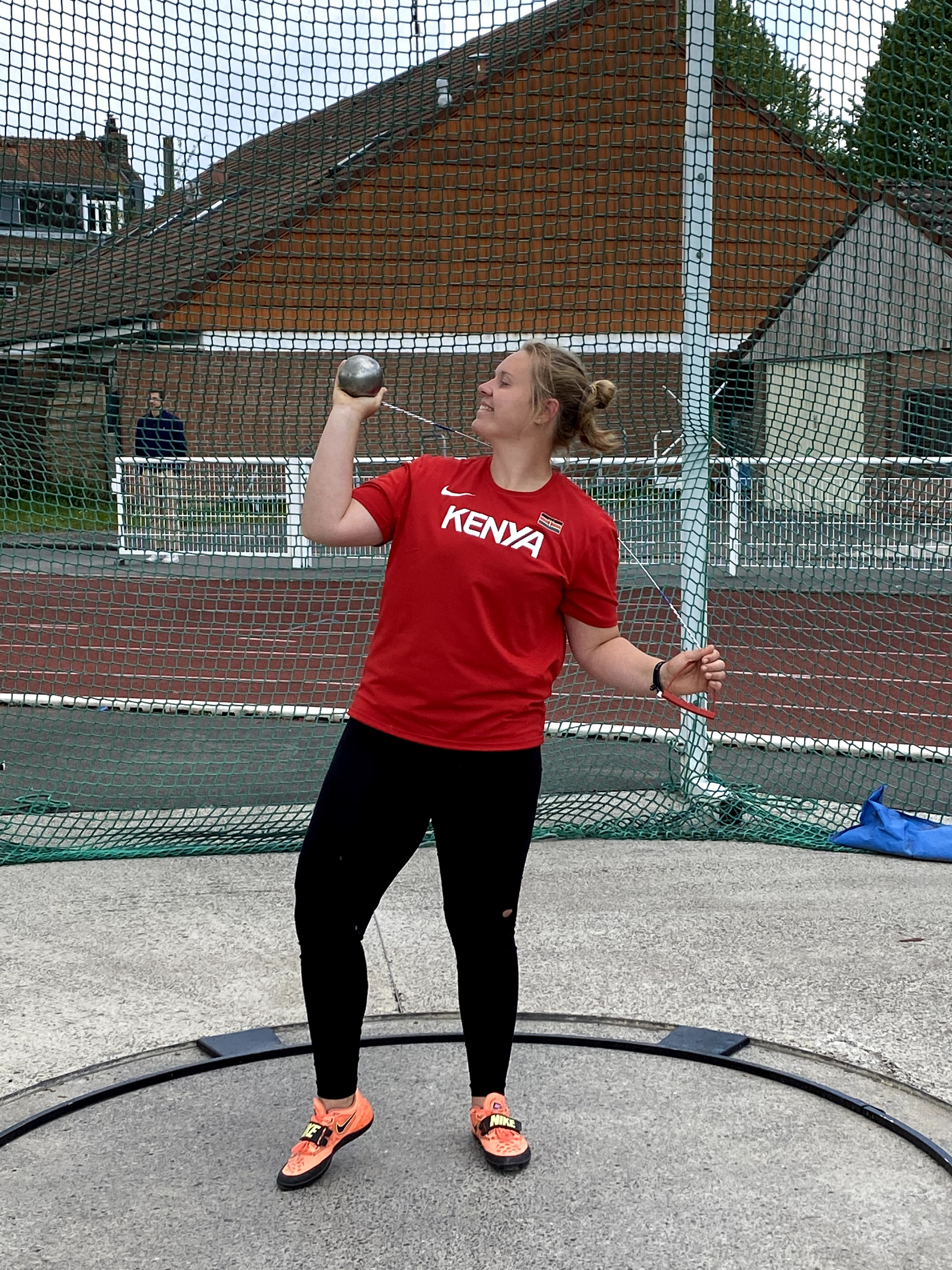

Personal information
- Born: 15 September 1995 (age 30) Leuven, Belgium

Sport
- Sport: Athletics
- Event: Hammer throw
- Club: Lille Métropole Athlétisme
- Coached by: Marie Jo Leroy

Vanessa Sterckendries (born 15 September 1995) is a Belgian athlete competing in the hammer throw. She holds the national record in the hammer throw and was the first ever female Belgian athlete to compete in the hammer throw at the European and World Athletics championships and the Summer Olympic Games.

== International competitions ==
Year	Competition	Venue	Position	Event	Notes
Representing Belgium
2014	World Junior Championships	Eugene, USA	8th	Hammer throw	61.63 m NJR
2017	European U23 Championships	Bydgoszcz, Poland	16th (q)	Hammer throw	61.75 m
2022	World Athletics Championships	Eugene, USA	24th (q)	Hammer throw	67.88 m
2022	European Athletics Championships	Munich, Germany	18th (q)	Hammer throw	66.95 m
2024	Summer Olympics	Paris, France	24th (q)	Hammer throw	67.67 m

== Personal bests ==
Outdoor

- Hammer throw – 69.91 m (Leverkusen 2020) NR
- Discus throw – 48.20 m (Kessel-Lo 2014)
- Shot put – 13.15 m (Nivelles 2016)
