= Midfield, County Mayo =

Midfield An Trian Láir
- Village
- Midfield plaque

- Location in Ireland
- Coordinates: 53.8971°N 8.9271°W
- Country: Ireland
- Province: Connacht
- County: County Mayo

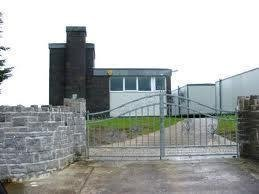
Midfield National School

Midfield (Irish: An Trian Láir, meaning 'middle third', anglicised to Treanlaur) is a village, in the barony of Gallen, in County Mayo, in Ireland. It is located close to the towns of Kilkelly, Kiltimagh, and Swinford, and to Ireland West (Knock) Airport.

== History ==
The village of Midfield lies in the townland of Treanlaur. Evidence of ancient settlement in the area includes a number of enclosures and ringforts within Treanlaur and in the neighbouring townland of Brackloon.

Midfield is in the Roman Catholic parish of Swinford, part of the Diocese of Achonry. The Church of St. Joseph's, which is in the middle of the village, was built c. 1875. The primary school was originally in Brackloon to the west, but this school closed in June 1965. A new school, St. Joseph's National School, was opened on the east side of the village after this.

== Community ==
A community group, the Midfield Development Association, was formed in 2007. The group has engaged in fundraising for local projects, including a Guinness Book of Records attempt in 2009, and produced a book entitled "A Story Told to Us Last Night" in 2010.

== Notable people ==
- Michaela Walsh, shotputter and hammer thrower, is a past pupil of St Joseph's National School.
- Mary Davis, activist, 2011 Irish presidential candidate and former CEO of Special Olympics International is from the nearby village of Kinaffe.

== Gallery ==
Carrabawn Rabawn & Castlebawn plaque

Midfield Parish Church

Midfield Parish Church interior with tabernacle and altar

Midfield Parish Church interior from choir gallery
