= Suvi Niiranen =

Finnish athlete (born 1997)

Personal information
- Nationality: Finnish
- Born: 24 April 1997 (age 29)

Sport
- Sport: Athletics
- Event: Hammer throw

Achievements and titles
- Personal best: Hanmer: 71.10m (2023)
Medal record
Women's athletics
Representing Finland
World Junior Championships
Bronze medal – third place	2016 Bydgoszcz	Hammer throw

Suvi Niiranen, née Koskinen, (born 24 April 1997) is a Finnish hammer thrower. She had competed for Finland at multiple major championships, including the 2024 Olympic Games.

== Career ==
She was a bronze medalist in the hammer throw at the 2016 IAAF World U20 Championships in Bydgoszcz, Poland with a best distance of 62.49 metres. In 2020, she increased her personal best to 67.69 metres. In August 2020, she finished third at the Finnish Athletics Championships with a throw of 65.17 metres.

In July 2021, she finished third at the Finnish Athletics Championships with a throw of 68.03 metres. She competed at the 2022 World Athletics Championships in Eugene, Oregon, the women's hammer where a throw of 67.98 metres was enough for a 23rd-place finish. She competed at the 2023 World Championships in Budapest, Hungary, throwing 70.81 metres but not qualifying for the final. In June 2023 in Kuortane, she threw a personal best hammer throw of 71.10 metres, this throw moved her into third place on Finland's all-time list behind Silja Kosonen and Krista Tervo. In July 2023, she finished runner-up to Silja Kosonen at the Finnish Athletics Championships with a throw of 71.09 metres.

She competed at the 2024 European Athletics Championships in Rome in the hammer throw, where she managed a distance of 70.94 metres without progressing to the final. In June 2024, she finished runner-up to Silja Kosonen at the Finnish Athletics Championships with a throw of 68.61 metres. She competed at the 2024 Olympics Games in Paris, however she expressed disappointment with her performance in throwing 67.90 metres which was not enough to make the final.

In September 2025, she competed in the hammer throw at the 2025 World Championships in Tokyo, Japan, throwing 66.37 metres without advancing to the final.

== Personal life ==
She is from the Ostrobothnia region.
