= Beatrice Nedberge Llano =

Norwegian hammer thrower (born 1997)

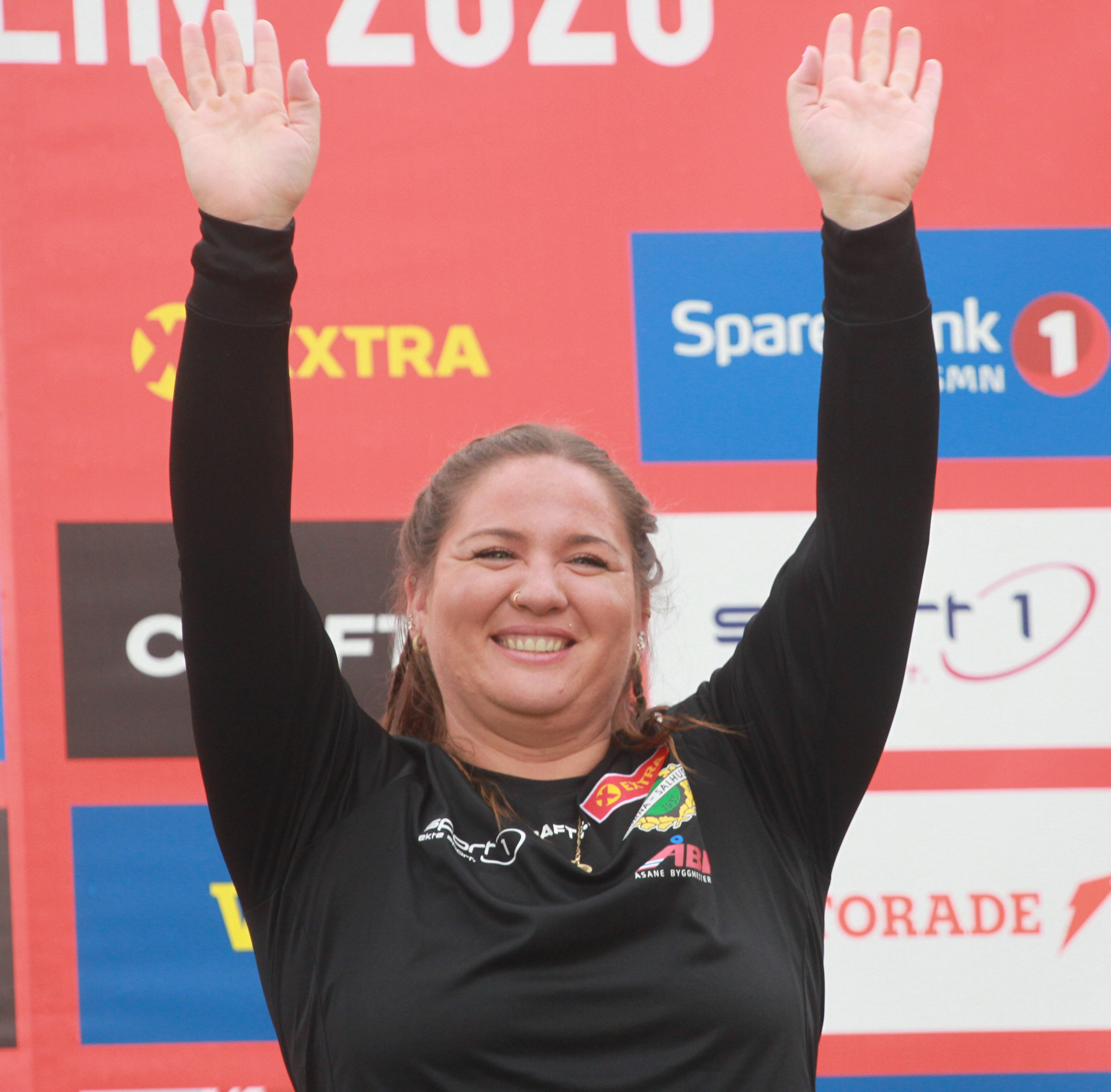
- Llano in 2026

Personal information
- Nicknames: Bea, B
- Born: 14 December 1997 (age 28) Bergen, Norway
- Education: Arizona State University
- Height: 1.71 m (5 ft 7 in)

Sport
- Sport: Athletics
- Event: Hammer throw
- College team: Arizona State
- Club: Norna-Salhus IL

Achievements and titles
- Personal best: Hammer throw: 73.21m (2026)
Medal record
Women's athletics
Representing Norway
European Championships
Bronze medal – third place	2026 Birmingham	Hammer throw
European U23 Championships
Bronze medal – third place	2017 Bydgoszcz	Hammer throw
World U20 Championships
Gold medal – first place	2016 Bydgoszcz	Hammer throw
European Junior Championships
Silver medal – second place	2015 Eskilstuna	Hammer throw

Beatrice Nedberge Llano (born 14 December 1997) is a Norwegian athlete specialising in the hammer throw. She is a European Championships bronze medallist and a nine-time national champion. Llano is also a European U23 Championships bronze medallist, World U20 Championships gold medallist and European Junior Championships silver medallist. She holds the national record with a personal best throw of 73.21 metres, set in Athens in 2026. Llano competed in the women's hammer throw event at the 2024 Olympic Games.

== Career ==
Llano became Norwegian champion in 2015, 2016, 2017, 2019, 2020, 2021, 2023, 2024, and 2025 representing Laksevåg TIL.

Llano was an All-American thrower for the Arizona State Sun Devils track and field team, finishing 3rd in the hammer throw at the 2022 NCAA Division I Outdoor Track and Field Championships.

She won the bronze medal in the hammer throw at the 2026 European Championships in Birmingham, England.

== Personal life ==
Llano hails from Bergen with a Norwegian mother and Chilean father. Her sister, Paula Nedberge Llano, was a pole vaulter on national level, with bronze medals at the Norwegian championships in 2010, 2013, 2014 and 2015.

== Achievements ==
Year	Competition	Venue	Position	Event	Notes
Representing Norway
2013	World Youth Championships	Donetsk, Ukraine	4th	Hammer throw (3 kg)	68.31 m
2014	World Junior Championships	Eugene, United States	5th	Hammer throw	63.23 m
2015	European Junior Championships	Eskilstuna, Sweden	2nd	Hammer throw	64.76 m
2016	World U20 Championships	Bydgoszcz, Poland	1st	Hammer throw	64.33 m
2017	European U23 Championships	Bydgoszcz, Poland	3rd	Hammer throw	66.74 m
2019	European Throwing Cup (U23)	Šamorín, Slovakia	3rd	Hammer throw	67.89 m
2019	World Championships	Doha, Qatar	28th (q)	Hammer throw	65.55 m
2022	World Championships	Eugene, Oregon	28th (q)	Hammer throw	64.81 m
2022	European Championships	Munich, Germany	19th (q)	Hammer throw	66.32 m
2023	World Championships	Budapest, Hungary	21st (q)	Hammer throw	69.11 m
2024	European Championships	Rome, Italy	22nd (q)	Hammer throw	66.53 m
2024	Olympic Games	Paris, France	27th (q)	Hammer throw	66.92 m
2025	World Championships	Tokyo, Japan	15th (q)	Hammer throw	70.10 m
2026	European Championships	Birmingham, United Kingdom	3rd	Hammer throw	72.88 m
