= Camille Sainte-Luce =

French hammer thrower

Personal information
- Born: 18 April 1996 (age 29) Le Blanc-Mesnil, France
- Height: 1.86 m (6 ft 1 in)
- Weight: 100 kg (220 lb)

Sport
- Sport: Athletics
- Event: Hammer throw
- Club: Savigny Senart Athletisme
- Coached by: Ciofani Walter

Camille Sainte-Luce (born 18 April 1996) is a French athlete specialising in the hammer throw. She won a silver medal at the 2017 European U23 Championships and bronze at the 2018 Mediterranean Games.

Her personal best in the event is 69.90 metres set in Tarragona in 2018.

== International competitions ==
Year	Competition	Venue	Position	Event	Notes
Representing France
2013	World Youth Championships	Donetsk, Ukraine	24th (q)	Hammer throw (3 kg)	58.80 m
2015	European Junior Championships	Eskilstuna, Sweden	9th	Hammer throw	59.15 m
2016	Mediterranean U23 Games	Tunis, Tunisia	3rd	Hammer throw	64.07 m
2017	European U23 Championships	Bydgoszcz, Poland	2nd	Hammer throw	66.98 m
2018	Mediterranean Games	Tarragona, Spain	3rd	Hammer throw	69.60 m
