= Sofiya Palkina =

Russian hammer thrower

Personal information
- Born: 9 June 1998 (age 28)

Sport
- Country: Russia
- Sport: Athletics
- Event: Hammer throw

Achievements and titles
- Personal best: Hammer throw: 72.18 m (2019)
Medal record
Representing Russia
World Youth Championships
| Gold medal – first place | 2015 Cali | Hammer throw |
Representing Authorised Neutral Athletes
European Junior Championships
| Gold medal – first place | 2019 Gävle | Hammer throw |

Sofiya Olegovna Palkina (Russian: Софья Олеговна Палкина; born 9 June 1998) is a Russian female hammer thrower, who won an individual gold medal at the 2015 World Youth Championships and at the 2019 European Athletics U23 Championships.
