= Anna Maria Orel =

Estonian hammer thrower

Anna Maria Čeh
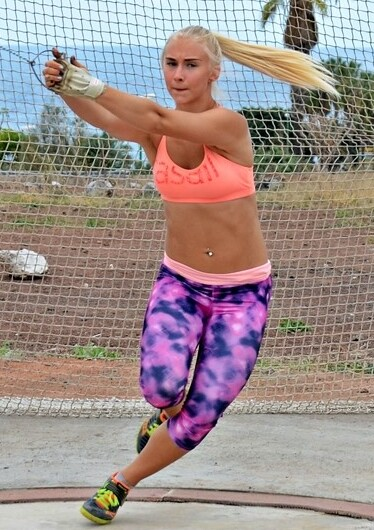
- Čeh in 2016

Personal information
- Born: 11 December 1996 (age 29) Jõhvi, Estonia

Sport
- Country: Estonia
- Sport: Athletics
- Event: Hammer throw

Achievements and titles
- Personal best: 69.85 (27.04.19)

Anna Maria Čeh (born as Anna Maria Orel) (11 December 1996) is an Estonian hammer thrower.

Čeh represented Estonia at the 2013 World Youth Championships, 2014 World Junior Championships and 2015 European Junior Championships, but was always eliminated in the qualifying round. She improved the Estonian junior record several times in 2015, finishing with 62.32 m. In 2016, she set two Estonian under-23 records (66.06 m and 66.44 m) and then threw 67.52 m in Lapinlahti on June 19, breaking her training partner Kati Ojaloo's outright Estonian record of 67.26 m.

Čeh is coached by Finnish hammer coach Jarmo Pöyry.

In September 2024 she married Slovenian disc thrower Kristjan Čeh.

== Competition record ==
Year	Competition	Venue	Position	Result
Representing Estonia
2014	World Junior Championships	Eugene, United States	19th (q)	55.87 m
2017	European U23 Championships	Bydgoszcz, Poland	12th	63.24 m
2017	World Championships	London, United Kingdom	18th (q)	67.37 m
2018	European Championships	Berlin, Germany	16th (q)	67.22 m
