= Krista Tervo =

Finnish hammer thrower (born 1997)

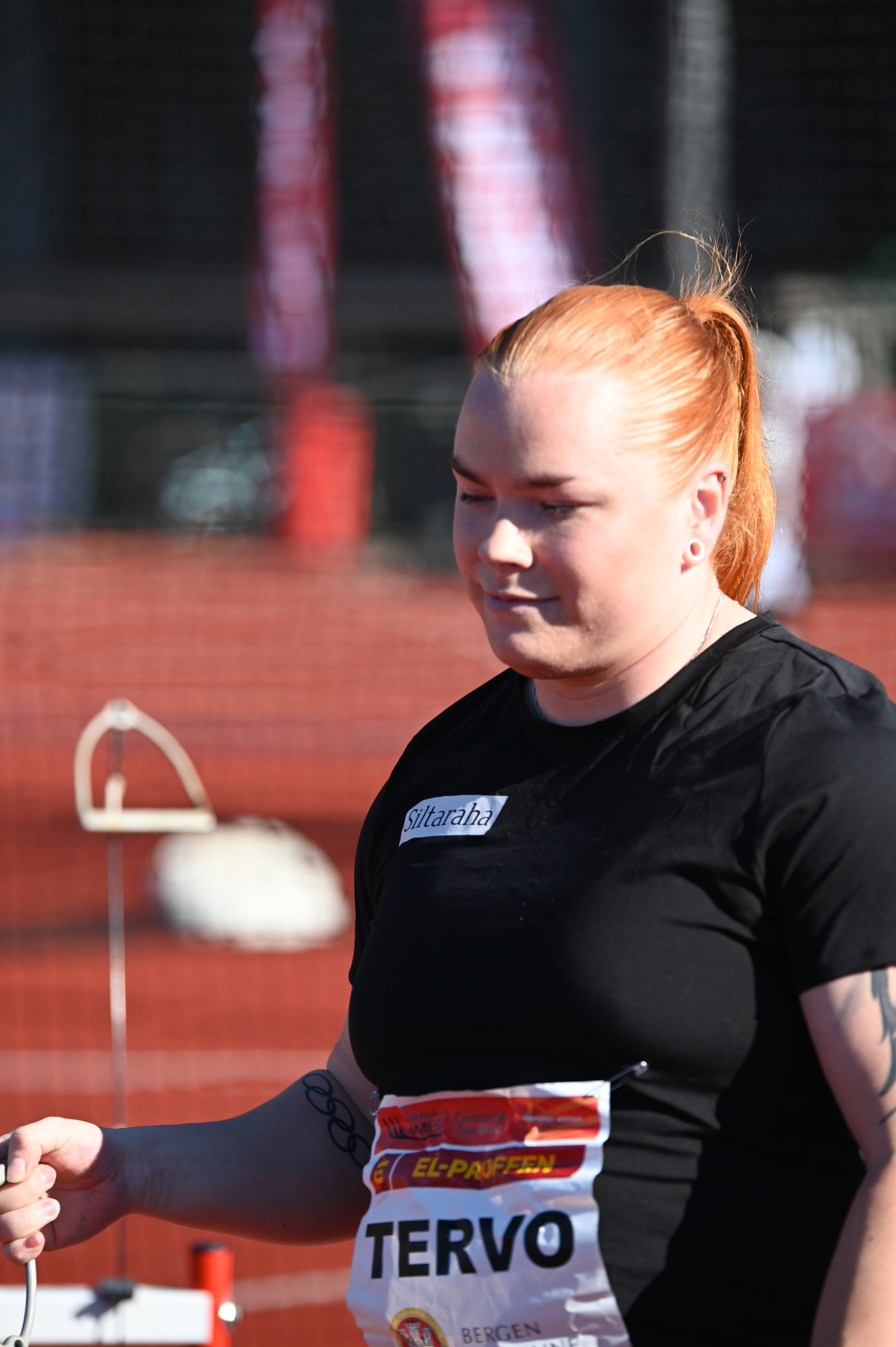
- Tervo in 2026

Personal information
- Full name: Krista Katariina Tervo
- Born: 15 November 1997 (age 28) Kotka, Finland

Sport
- Sport: Athletics
- Event: Hammer throw
- Club: Karhulan Urheilijat; Karhulan Katajaiset
- Coached by: Jukka Vihtonen

Krista Katariina Tervo (born 15 November 1997 in Kotka) is a Finnish athlete specialising in the hammer throw. She finished fourth at the 2016 World U20 Championships and ninth at the 2017 European U23 Championships.

Her personal best in the event is 77.35 meters, the current Finnish national record, set in May 2026.

== International competitions ==
Year	Competition	Venue	Position	Event	Notes
Representing Finland
2015	European Junior Championships	Eskilstuna, Sweden	11th	Hammer throw	58.28 m
2016	World U20 Championships	Bydgoszcz, Poland	4th	Hammer throw	62.25 m
2017	European U23 Championships	Bydgoszcz, Poland	9th	Hammer throw	63.97 m
2018	European Championships	Berlin, Germany	21st (q)	Hammer throw	65.37 m
2019	European U23 Championships	Gävle, Sweden	6th	Hammer throw	63.82 m
2019	World Championships	Doha, Qatar	21st (q)	Hammer throw	68.25 m
2021	Olympic Games	Tokyo, Japan	–	Hammer throw	NM
2022	World Championships	Eugene, United States	10th	Hammer throw	69.04 m
2022	European Championships	Munich, Germany	8th	Hammer throw	67.85 m
2023	World Championships	Budapest, Hungary	23rd (q)	Hammer throw	68.00 m
2024	European Championships	Rome, Italy	23rd (q)	Hammer throw	66.16 m
2024	Olympic Games	Paris, France	6th	Hammer throw	73.83 m
2025	World Championships	Tokyo, Japan	5th (q)	Hammer throw	73.73 m^{1}
2026	European Championships	Birmingham, United Kingdom	11th	Hammer throw	67.74 m

^{1} No mark in the final
