= Kimberley Reed =

Scottish hammer thrower

Kimberley Reed (born 18 February 1995) is a Scottish hammer thrower. Her personal best throw of 55.98 metres—achieved at the 2011 Scottish School's Championships in Grangemouth, Scotland—is the current British U17 record.

Reed was born in Edinburgh, Scotland.

== International competitions ==
Year	Competition	Venue	Position	Notes
Representing Scotland
2011	2011 Commonwealth Youth Games	Douglas, Isle of Man	2nd	54.22 m
Representing the United Kingdom
2014	World Junior Championships	Eugene, Oregon, United States	10th	60.17 m
