= Louisa James (athlete) =

British hammer thrower

Personal information
- Born: 5 July 1994 (age 31)

Sport
- Country: Great Britain
- Sport: Athletics
- Event: Hammer throw

Achievements and titles
- Personal best: Hammer throw: 62.30 m (2014)

Louisa James (born 5 July 1994) is a British hammer thrower, who won an individual gold medal at the Youth World Championships.
