= Michaela Walsh (athlete) =

Irish shot putter and hammer thrower

Personal information
- Nationality: Irish
- Born: 17 December 1998 (age 27)
- Height: 1.68

Sport
- Sport: Athletics

Michaela Walsh (born 17 December 1998) is an Irish junior record-holding hammer thrower and shotputter from Midfield, Swinford, County Mayo.

== Athletics career ==
Walsh's first experience at international competitions was at the European Youth Olympic Festival in Utrecht in 2013, where she finished tenth in the final. A year later, she qualified for the Summer Youth Olympics in Nanjing, China, where she attained sixth place in the shot-put final with 15.69 m. In 2015 she participated in the World Youth Championships in Cali, Colombia, and finishing ninth in the shot put and tenth with the hammer. A year later, she finished in eleventh place in the shot put with 14.73 m, at the World U20 Championships in Bydgoszcz, Poland. In 2017, while ranked fourth in the hammer and sixth in the shot, she entered the European U20 Championships in Grosseto, Italy, and winning bronze in the hammer with a throw of 61.27 meters. In addition, she finished in seventh place in the shot put.

In 2017 and 2018, Walsh became Irish Indoor Champion in Shot Put.

== Results ==
- Shot Put: 16.13 m, 17 June 2017 in Bedford
  - Shot Put (Indoor): 15.36 m, 17 February 2018 in Abbotstown
- Hammer: 63.01 m, 1 July 2017 in Tullamore

== Awards ==
- Mayo Association Dublin - Mayo Young Person of the Year Award
