= Marinda Petersson =

Swedish hammer thrower

Personal information
- Nationality: Swedish
- Born: 3 February 1995 (age 30)

Sport
- Sport: Athletics
- Event: Hammer throw

Marinda Petersson (born 3 February 1995) is a Swedish hammer thrower. She competed in the women's hammer throw at the 2017 World Championships in Athletics.
