= Nastassia Maslava =

Belarusian hammer thrower

Personal information
- Nationality: Belarus
- Born: 16 October 1997 (age 28) Drahichyn, Belarus

Sport
- Sport: Athletics

Nastassia Maslava (Belarusian: Наста́сься Ма́слава; born 16 October 1997) is a Belarusian hammer thrower. She competed in the 2020 Summer Olympics.
