= Alyona Shamotina =

Ukrainian hammer thrower (born 1995)

Personal information
- Nationality: Ukrainian
- Born: 27 December 1995 (age 30)

Sport
- Sport: Athletics
- Event: Hammer throw

Achievements and titles
- Personal best: Hammer throw: 72.17 m (2017)
Medal record
Women's athletics
Representing Ukraine
European Athletics U23 Championships
Gold medal – first place	2017 Bydgoszcz	Hammer throw
European Team Championships
Bronze medal – third place	2017 Lille	Hammer throw
World Junior Championships
Gold medal – first place	2014 Eugene	Hammer throw
European Youth Olympic Festival
Silver medal – second place	2011 Trabzon	Hammer throw

Alyona Shamotina (born 27 December 1995) is a Ukrainian hammer thrower. She competed in the women's hammer throw at the 2017 World Championships in Athletics.
