= 2024 European Athletics Championships – Men's shot put =

Men's shot put at the 2024 European Athletics Championships
- Venue: Stadio Olimpico
- Location: Rome
- Dates: 7 June (qualification); 8 June (final)
- Competitors: 29 from 19 nations
- Winning time: 22.45 CR

Medalists
gold medal	Leonardo Fabbri	Italy
silver medal	Filip Mihaljević	Croatia
bronze medal	Michał Haratyk	Poland

The men's shot put at the 2024 European Athletics Championships took place at the Stadio Olimpico on 7 and 8 June.

== Records ==
Standing records prior to the 2024 European Athletics Championships
World record	Ryan Crouser (USA)	23.56 m	Los Angeles, California, United States	27 May 2023
European record	Ulf Timmermann (GDR)	23.06 m	Chania, Greece	22 May 1988
Championship record	Werner Günthör (SUI)	22.22 m	Stuttgart, West Germany	28 August 1986
World Leading	Joe Kovacs (USA)	23.13 m	Eugene, Oregon, United States	25 May 2024
Europe Leading	Leonardo Fabbri (ITA)	22.95 m	Savona, Italy	15 May 2024

== Schedule ==
Date	Time	Round
7 June 2024	19:55	Qualification
8 June 2024	21:02	Final

All times are local times (UTC+2)

== Results ==
=== Qualification ===
Qualification: 20.70 m (Q) or best 12 performers (q)

Rank	Group	Name	Nationality	#1	#2	#3	Result	Note
1	A	Leonardo Fabbri	Italy	21.10			21.10	Q
2	A	Marcus Thomsen	Norway	20.69			20.69	q
3	A	Filip Mihaljević	Croatia	20.05	20.69		20.69	q
4	B	Wictor Petersson	Sweden	20.19	20.57	19.99	20.57	q
5	B	Tomáš Staněk	Czech Republic	20.53			20.53	q
6	B	Scott Lincoln	Great Britain	19.97	20.31		20.31	q
7	A	Bob Bertemes	Luxembourg	19.70	19.60	20.23	20.23	q
8	B	Francisco Belo	Portugal	20.18	20.02	x	20.18	q
9	B	Andrei Toader	Romania	19.29	20.13	19.78	20.13	q
10	A	Michał Haratyk	Poland	19.00	19.79	19.66	19.79	q
11	B	Mesud Pezer	Bosnia and Herzegovina	19.04	19.79	19.41	19.79	q
12	B	Zane Weir	Italy	18.80	x	19.71	19.71	q
13	A	Silas Ristl	Germany	19.38	19.15	19.64	19.64	
14	A	Eric Favors	Ireland	19.39	19.46	19.60	19.60	
15	A	Tsanko Arnaudov	Portugal	19.42	19.42	19.31	19.42	
16	B	Roman Kokoshko	Ukraine	x	19.41	19.30	19.41	
17	B	Konrad Bukowiecki	Poland	19.17	18.69	19.20	19.20	
18	B	Asmir Kolašinac	Serbia	19.17	19.19	x	19.19	
19	B	Jander Heil	Estonia	18.71	19.14	x	19.14	
20	B	Muhamet Ramadani	Kosovo	18.64	18.71	19.10	19.10	
21	A	Giorgi Mujaridze	Georgia	x	18.99	x	18.99	
22	A	Jesper Arbinge	Sweden	18.97	18.86	x	18.97	
23	B	Odysseas Mouzenidis	Greece	18.46	18.84	18.70	18.84	
24	A	Lorenzo del Gatto	Italy	18.46	18.83	18.82	18.83	
25	B	Szymon Mazur	Poland	18.35	18.76	x	18.76	
26	A	Tadeáš Procházka	Czech Republic	17.95	x	17.59	17.95	
27	A	Marius Musteață	Romania	17.46	x	x	17.46	
28	A	Anastasios Latifllari	Greece	16.83	x	x	16.83	
	A	Armin Sinančević	Serbia	x	x	x	NM	

=== Final ===
The final started on 8 June at 21:02.

Rank	Name	Nationality	#1	#2	#3	#4	#5	#6	Result	Note
1st place, gold medalist(s)	Leonardo Fabbri	Italy	20.42	22.12	x	x	22.45	21.93	22.45	CR
2nd place, silver medalist(s)	Filip Mihaljević	Croatia	21.10	20.69	20.96	20.63	x	21.20	21.20	
3rd place, bronze medalist(s)	Michał Haratyk	Poland	20.94	20.55	x	19.81	20.79	20.55	20.94	SB
4	Scott Lincoln	Great Britain	20.51	x	19.92	20.88	20.23	x	20.88	
5	Tomáš Staněk	Czech Republic	20.19	x	19.48	20.88	x	20.09	20.88	
6	Bob Bertemes	Luxembourg	19.60	x	20.86	x	x	x	20.86	
7	Andrei Toader	Romania	19.24	20.38	20.07	20.19	20.43	19.83	20.43	
8	Marcus Thomsen	Norway	19.98	20.42	20.24	20.11	20.34	20.20	20.42	
9	Mesud Pezer	Bosnia and Herzegovina	19.70	19.60	19.92				19.92	
10	Francisco Belo	Portugal	19.74	19.37	x				19.74	
11	Zane Weir	Italy	19.36	19.70	19.25				19.70	
12	Wictor Petersson	Sweden	19.45	19.41	x				19.45	
