= 2025 World Athletics Championships – Men's shot put =

Men's shot put at the 2025 World Athletics Championships
- Venue: National Stadium
- Location: Tokyo, Japan
- Dates: 13 September
- Competitors: 36 from 26 nations
- Winning distance: 22.34 m

Medalists
gold medal	Ryan Crouser	United States
silver medal	Uziel Muñoz	Mexico
bronze medal	Leonardo Fabbri	Italy

The men's shot put at the 2025 World Athletics Championships was held at the National Stadium in Tokyo on 13 September 2025.

== Summary ==
Crouser had not made a throw in a legitimate competition since September 2024. An injury to his right (throwing) elbow took a long time to heal. As defending champion, he had a bye into the meet. In his absence, Leonardo Fabbri came in as the world leader.

In the qualifying round Crouser took his first throw in a year, 21.37 m beating the auto qualifying mark of 21.35 by 2 cm. Only two other athletes, Adrian Piperi and Tom Walsh, the 2017 Champion and current world Indoor Champion made an auto mark, Walsh needing two attempts. It took a tiebreaker at 20.38 m to make the final. While it takes the special circumstance of a bye for a fourth athlete from a country to get into the competition, seven were born in the USA.

In the final, Walsh took the early lead with 21.58 m, Crouser pulled into second place with a 21.41m, a season's best. Fabbri dropped a 21.83 m which held up as the leader until Crouser's third throw of the season landed on the tape 22 meter line, measured at 21.99 m. Those three remained in that order to the fifth round. Walsh tickled the 22 meter line with a 21.94m, which Crouser said later, "woke up the competition." Fabbri answered with a 21.94 m of his own. The 21.83 m meant he still held on to second place. Then Crouser let loose his only throw of the season to have a full extension of his elbow. It flew well past 22, for 22.34 m. In the final round, Chukwuebuka Enekwechi threw 21.52 m to leapfrog from 8th to 4th. Then Uziel Muñoz hit the tape, then sprinted out of the ring in celebration. This one measured 21.97 m, a new Mexican record, to go from 6th to 2nd. Nobody else could improve in the final round so Crouser had his third consecutive Gold Medal without needing to take his last throw.

== Records ==
Before the competition records were as follows:

Record	Athlete & Nat.	Perf.	Location	Date
World Record	Ryan Crouser (USA)	23.56 m	Los Angeles, California	27 May 2023
Championship Record	Ryan Crouser (USA)	23.51 m	Budapest, Hungary	19 August 2023
World Leading	Leonardo Fabbri (ITA)	22.82 m	Caorle, Italy	3 August 2025
African Record	Chukwuebuka Enekwechi (NGR)	22.10 m	Eugene, United States	5 July 2025
Asian Record	Mohammed Tolo (KSA)	21.80 m	Madrid, Spain	21 June 2024
European Record	Ulf Timmermann (GDR)	23.06 m	Chania, Greece	22 May 1988
North, Central American and Caribbean Record	Ryan Crouser (USA)	23.56 m	Los Angeles, California	27 May 2023
Oceanian Record	Tom Walsh (NZL)	22.90 m	Doha, Qatar	5 October 2019
South American Record	Darlan Romani (BRA)	22.61 m	Palo Alto, United States	30 June 2019

== Qualification standard ==
The standard to qualify automatically for entry was 21.50 m.

== Schedule ==
The event schedule, in local time (UTC+9), was as follows:

Date	Time	Round
13 September	10:55	Qualification
13 September	21:10	Final

== Results ==
=== Qualification ===
All athletes over 21.35 m ( Q ) or at least the 12 best performers ( q ) advanced to the final.

==== Group A ====
Place	Athlete	Nation	Round			Mark	Notes
Place	Athlete	Nation	1	2	3	Mark	Notes
1	Adrian Piperi	United States	21.47			21.47 m	Q
2	Ryan Crouser	United States	21.37			21.37 m	Q, SB
3	Wictor Petersson	Sweden	21.02	21.14	x	21.14 m	q
4	Leonardo Fabbri	Italy	20.95	20.53	x	20.95 m	q
5	Chukwuebuka Enekwechi	Nigeria	20.83	20.71	20.83	20.83 m	q
6	Tomáš Staněk	Czech Republic	20.67	20.53	x	20.67 m	q
7	Andrei Toader	Romania	20.38	19.69	19.67	20.38 m	
8	Nick Ponzio	Italy	x	20.20	20.34	20.34 m	
9	Nick Palmer	New Zealand	20.18	19.55	19.37	20.18 m	
10	Armin Sinančević	Serbia	x	x	20.18	20.18 m	
11	Xing Jialiang	China	19.81	19.94	x	19.94 m	
12	Mohammad Reza Tayebi	Iran	18.02	18.48	19.85	19.85 m	
13	Willian Dourado	Brazil	19.73	x	19.78	19.78 m	
14	Mohamed Magdi Hamza	Egypt	x	19.49	x	19.49 m	
15	Giorgi Mujaridze	Georgia	19.10	19.34	x	19.34 m	
16	Aiden Smith	South Africa	19.32	19.32	19.28	19.32 m	
17	Eric Favors	Ireland	19.17	19.19	x	19.19 m	
18	Ali Peker	Turkey	18.36	17.86	x	18.36 m	

==== Group B ====
Place	Athlete	Nation	Round			Mark	Notes
Place	Athlete	Nation	1	2	3	Mark	Notes
1	Tom Walsh	New Zealand	21.13	21.74		21.74 m	Q
2	Scott Lincoln	Great Britain & N.I.	20.80	20.57	21.00	21.00 m	q
3	Josh Awotunde	United States	20.78	20.47	x	20.78 m	q
4	Uziel Muñoz	Mexico	20.48	20.56	20.77	20.77 m	q
5	Marcus Thomsen	Norway	20.48	x	x	20.48 m	q
6	Konrad Bukowiecki	Poland	x	20.38	20.28	20.38 m	q
7	Zhang Haochen	China	19.73	19.79	19.94	19.94 m	
8	Zane Weir	Italy	x	19.89	x	19.89 m	
9	Payton Otterdahl	United States	19.78	x	x	19.78 m	
10	Tsanko Arnaudov	Portugal	19.59	18.89	19.34	19.59 m	
11	Juan Carley Vázquez	Cuba	19.21	x	18.56	19.21 m	
12	Jesper Arbinge	Sweden	19.03	x	r	19.03 m	
13	Chris van Niekerk	South Africa	18.81	x	x	18.81 m	
14	Mohammed Tolo	Saudi Arabia	17.63	17.66	18.08	18.08 m	
—	Mesud Pezer	Bosnia and Herzegovina	x	x	x	NM	
—	Artem Levchenko	Ukraine	x	x	x	NM	
—	Djimon Gumbs	British Virgin Islands	x	x	x	NM	
—	Welington Morais	Brazil				DNS	

=== Final ===
Place	Athlete	Nation	Round						Mark	Notes
Place	Athlete	Nation	#1	#2	#3	#4	#5	#6	Mark	Notes
1st place, gold medalist(s)	Ryan Crouser	United States	21.41	21.99	21.79	x	22.34	–	22.34 m	SB
2nd place, silver medalist(s)	Uziel Muñoz	Mexico	20.58	21.29	x	21.50	21.47	21.97	21.97 m	NR
3rd place, bronze medalist(s)	Leonardo Fabbri	Italy	21.26	21.83	x	21.59	21.94	21.03	21.94 m	
4	Tom Walsh	New Zealand	21.58	x	20.72	21.19	21.94	21.08	21.94 m	SB
5	Chukwuebuka Enekwechi	Nigeria	20.90	x	20.59	21.34	x	21.52	21.52 m	
6	Adrian Piperi	United States	21.05	21.20	21.50	20.99	x	x	21.50 m	
7	Josh Awotunde	United States	19.79	21.14	x	19.09	21.11		21.14 m	
8	Scott Lincoln	Great Britain & N.I.	20.48	21.00	x	20.67	20.24		21.00 m	
9	Konrad Bukowiecki	Poland	20.20	20.42	20.64	20.66			20.66 m	
10	Marcus Thomsen	Norway	x	x	20.41	20.53			20.53 m	
11	Wictor Petersson	Sweden	19.99	20.35	20.32				20.35 m	
12	Tomáš Staněk	Czech Republic	x	19.63	19.91				19.91 m	
