= 2025 European Athletics Indoor Championships – Men's shot put =

Men's shot put at the 2025 European Athletics Indoor Championships
- Venue: Omnisport Apeldoorn
- Location: Apeldoorn, Netherlands
- Dates: 9 March 2025
- Competitors: 18 from 13 nations
- Winning mark: 21.27 m

Medalists
gold medal	Andrei Toader	Romania
silver medal	Wictor Petersson	Sweden
bronze medal	Tomáš Staněk	Czech Republic

The men's shot put at the 2025 European Athletics Indoor Championships was held on the short track of Omnisport in Apeldoorn, Netherlands, on 9 March 2025. This was the 18th time the event was contested at the European Athletics Indoor Championships. Athletes can qualify by achieving the entry standard or by their World Athletics Ranking in the event.

The qualifying round is scheduled for 9 March during the morning session. The final is scheduled for 9 March during the evening session.

== Background ==
The men's shot put was contested 37 times before 2025, at every previous edition of the European Athletics Indoor Championships (1970–2023). The 2025 European Athletics Indoor Championships will be held in Omnisport Apeldoorn in Apeldoorn, Netherlands. The removable indoor athletics track was retopped for these championships in September 2024.

Ryan Crouser is the world record holder in the event, with a distance of 22.82 m, set in 2021. Ulf Timmermann is the European record holder, with a distance of 22.55 m, set in 1989. Timmermann also holds the championship record, set at the 1987 championships.

Records before the 2025 European Athletics Indoor Championships
Record	Athlete (nation)	Distance (m)	Location	Date
World record	Ryan Crouser (USA)	22.82	Fayetteville, United States	24 January 2021
European record	Ulf Timmermann (GDR)	22.55	Senftenberg, East Germany	11 February 1989
Championship record	Ulf Timmermann (GDR)	22.19	Liévin, France	21 February 1987
World leading	Leonardo Fabbri (ITA)	21.95	Liévin, France	13 February 2025
European leading	Leonardo Fabbri (ITA)	21.95	Liévin, France	13 February 2025

== Qualification ==
For the men's shot put, the qualification period runs from 25 February 2024 until 23 February 2025. Athletes can qualify by achieving the entry standards of 21.40 m or by virtue of their World Athletics Ranking for the event. There is a target number of 18 athletes.

== Rounds ==
=== Qualification ===
The qualifying round was held on 9 March, starting at 10:05 (UTC+1) in the morning. Qualification rule: all athletes obtaining the qualifying performance 21.00 (Q) or being the top 8 positions (q) qualify for the final.

Results of the qualification round
Rank	Athlete	Nation	#1	#2	#3	Result	Notes	PB
1	Tomáš Staněk	Czech Republic	x	21.26		21.26	Q	22.17
2	Zane Weir	Italy	19.61	20.91	–	20.91	q	22.44
3	Wictor Petersson	Sweden	20.65	x	20.14	20.65	q	21.49
4	Andrei Toader	Romania	20.50	20.00	20.59	20.59	q	21.29
5	Scott Lincoln	Great Britain	20.54	x	19.77	20.54	q	21.31
6	Artem Levchenko	Ukraine	x	20.25	x	20.25	q. PB	20.25
7	Nick Ponzio	Italy	20.24	x	20.10	20.24	q	21.83
8	Armin Sinančević	Serbia	20.11	19.99	x	20.11	q	21.88
9	Eric Maihöfer	Germany	19.10	19.88	x	19.88		20.37
10	Konrad Bukowiecki	Poland	x	19.78	x	19.78		22.25
11	Tsanko Arnaudov	Portugal	19.77	x	19.26	19.77		21.56
12	Leonardo Fabbri	Italy	x	19.72	x	19.72		22.98
13	Giorgi Mujaridze	Georgia	19.37	x	x	19.37		21.21
14	Jesper Arbinge	Sweden	19.32	19.08	x	19.32		20.44
15	Tadeáš Procházka	Czech Republic	18.62	x	18.97	18.97		19.73
16	Odysseas Mousenidis	Greece	x	17.11	18.67	18.67		19.98
17	Muhamet Ramadani	Kosovo	x	17.94	18.26	18.26	SB	19.54
	Anastasios Latiflari	Greece	x	x	x	NM		19.93

=== Final ===
The final was held on 9 March, starting at 16:28 (UTC+1) in the afternoon.

Results of the final
Rank	Athlete	Nation	#1	#2	#3	#4	#5	#6	Result	Notes
1st place, gold medalist(s)	Andrei Toader	Romania	21.08	20.57	20.31	x	20,50	21.27	21.27	NR
2nd place, silver medalist(s)	Wictor Petersson	Sweden	20.88	x	x	20.70	21.04	x	21.04	
3rd place, bronze medalist(s)	Tomáš Staněk	Czech Republic	x	20.50	20.75	20.28	x	x	20.75	
4	Scott Lincoln	Great Britain	x	19.19	20.73	20.56	x	20.69	20.73	
5	Armin Sinančević	Serbia	20.49	x	x	x	x	20.00	20.49	
6	Nick Ponzio	Italy	19.81	x	x	20.26	x	x	20.26	
7	Artem Levchenko	Ukraine	x	19.34	19.72	19.60	x	x	19.72	
8	Zane Weir	Italy	x	x	x	19.57	x	x	19.57	
