= 2015 World Youth Championships in Athletics – Boys' shot put =

Boys' shot put at the 2015 World Youth Championships in Athletics
- Venue: Estadio Olímpico Pascual Guerrero
- Dates: 15 July
- Competitors: 32 from 26 nations
- Winning distance: 22.00

Medalists
gold medal	Adrian Piperi	United States
silver medal	Szymon Mazur	Poland
bronze medal	Wictor Petersson	Sweden

The boys' shot put at the 2015 World Youth Championships in Athletics was held at the Estadio Olímpico Pascual Guerrero in Cali, Colombia on 15 July 2015.

== Records ==
Prior to the competition, the following records were as follows.

World Youth Best	Jacko Gill (NZL)	24.45	Auckland, New Zealand	19 December 2011
Championship Record	Jacko Gill (NZL)	24.35	Lille, France	7 July 2011
World Youth Leading	Wictor Petersson (SWE)	21.26	Södertälje, Sweden	6 June 2015

== Results ==
=== Qualification ===
With qualifying standard of 19.45 (Q) or at least the 12 best performers (q) advance to the final.

Rank	Group	Name	Nationality	1	2	3	Mark	Notes
1	B	Shehab Mohamed Abdalaziz	Egypt	20.79			20.79	Q, PB
2	A	Szymon Mazur	Poland	20.77			20.77	Q
3	B	Wictor Petersson	Sweden	20.02			20.02	Q
4	B	Burger Lambrechts	South Africa	19.97			19.97	Q
5	A	Adrian Piperi	United States	19.87			19.87	Q
6	A	Patrick Duvenage	South Africa	19.42	x	19.73	19.73	Q
7	A	Joseph Maxwell	Canada	19.32	19.67		19.67	Q
8	A	Giorgi Mujaridze	Georgia	18.47	19.58		19.58	Q
9	B	Zhang Xinyuan	China	18.74	19.57		19.57	Q, PB
10	B	Marcus Thomsen	Norway	19.09	19.38	19.15	19.38	q
11	A	Alejandro Castillo	Mexico	19.24	x	18.87	19.24	q
12	B	Isaiah Rogers	United States	x	18.98	19.20	19.20	q
13	B	Odisséfs Mouzenídis	Greece	18.92	x	19.01	19.01	
14	A	Kevin Nedrick	Jamaica	18.39	19.00	x	19.00	PB
15	B	Paulius Gelažius	Lithuania	18.48	18.91	x	18.91	
16	B	Tobias Köhler	Germany	18.57	18.42	18.74	18.74	
17	A	Veljko Nedeljković	Serbia	x	18.66	x	18.66	
18	B	Ivan Karyuk	Ukraine	17.38	18.43	x	18.43	
19	A	Ned Weatherly	Australia	17.62	x	18.31	18.31	
20	B	Ionuț Apostu	Romania	16.89	17.86	18.23	18.23	
21	B	Ryan Ballantyne	New Zealand	18.06	x	18.21	18.21	
22	A	Arminas Čečkauskas	Lithuania	18.05	18.15	x	18.15	
23	A	Christos Moulistanos	Greece	17.98	x	17.15	17.98	
24	A	Mihail Mihalev	Bulgaria	17.86	17.55	17.94	17.94	
25	A	Ma Hau-we	Chinese Taipei	17.29	17.00	17.68	17.68	
26	B	Otoniel Badjana	Guinea-Bissau	17.37	16.88	x	17.37	
27	B	Jairo Morán	Mexico	x	17.31	17.30	17.31	
28	A	Ashish Bhalothia	India	17.29	16.83	16.34	17.29	
29	A	Luis Córdoba	Colombia	16.60	x	x	16.60	
30	B	Ariel Atias	Israel	x	16.52	16.17	16.52	
31	A	Jasmin Mujezin	Bosnia and Herzegovina	16.20	x	x	16.20	
–	B	Kyle Mitchell	Jamaica	x	x	x	NM	

=== Final ===
Rank	Name	Nationality	1	2	3	4	5	6	Mark	Notes
1st place, gold medalist(s)	Adrian Piperi	United States	20.02	22.00	x	21.50	21.16	22.00	22.00	WYL
2nd place, silver medalist(s)	Szymon Mazur	Poland	20.44	x	21.66	21.77	x	x	21.77	PB
3rd place, bronze medalist(s)	Wictor Petersson	Sweden	20.87	20.87	18.76	21.56	21.06	20.84	21.56	PB
4	Burger Lambrechts	South Africa	x	20.87	20.37	x	x	20.97	20.97	PB
5	Shehab Mohamed Abdalaziz	Egypt	19.32	20.76	20.79	x	x	x	20.79	PB
6	Joseph Maxwell	Canada	18.82	19.95	20.29	x	19.87	x	20.29	PB
7	Zhang Xinyuan	China	18.94	19.64	19.43	19.15	x	19.58	19.64	PB
8	Alejandro Castillo	Mexico	19.61	x	18.41	18.28	x	x	19.61	
9	Patrick Duvenage	South Africa	19.07	x	19.50				19.50	
10	Isaiah Rogers	United States	x	18.23	19.28				19.28	
11	Marcus Thomsen	Norway	19.16	x	x				19.16	
12	Giorgi Mujaridze	Georgia	18.54	18.90	17.86				18.90	
