= 2016 IAAF World U20 Championships – Men's shot put =

The men's shot put event at the 2016 IAAF World U20 Championships was held in Bydgoszcz, Poland, at Zdzisław Krzyszkowiak Stadium on 19 July. A 6 kg (junior implement) shot was used.

== Medalists ==
Gold	Bronson Osborn; United States
Silver	Wictor Petersson; Sweden
Bronze	Adrian Piperi; United States

== Results ==
=== Final ===
19 July

Rank	Name	Nationality	Attempts				Result	Notes
Rank	Name	Nationality	1	2	3	4	Result	Notes
~~1~~	Konrad Bukowiecki	Poland	~~22.46~~	x	~~23.34~~	x	~~23.34~~	~~WU20R~~ DQ
~~2~~	Andrei Toader	Romania	~~21.97~~	~~22.30~~	x	~~21.43~~	~~22.30~~	~~NU20R CR~~ DQ
1st place, gold medalist(s)	Bronson Osborn	United States	20.24	x	21.27	20.82	21.27	PB
2nd place, silver medalist(s)	Wictor Petersson	Sweden	17.63	20.51	20.65	19.60	20.65	PB
3rd place, bronze medalist(s)	Adrian Piperi	United States	x	20.21	20.48	20.62	20.62	PB
4	Szymon Mazur	Poland	19.45	19.74	20.40	x	20.40	PB
5	Tobias Kohler	Germany	19.72	19.76	x		19.76	PB
6	Burger Lambrechts, Jr.	South Africa	19.61	x	19.39		19.61	
7	Marcus Thomsen	Norway	18.70	x	19.39		19.39	
8	Jason van Rooyen	South Africa	17.92	x	19.38		19.38	
9	Cedric Trinemeier	Germany	x	19.07	18.71		19.07	
10	Shehab Mohamed Abdalaziz	Egypt	17.80	17.74	17.12		17.80	

=== Qualifications ===
19 July
With qualifying standard of 19.40 (Q) or at least the 12 best performers (q) advance to the Final

==== Summary ====
Rank	Name	Nationality	Result	Notes
~~1~~	Konrad Bukowiecki	Poland	~~21.73~~	DQ
~~2~~	Andrei Toader	Romania	~~21.26~~	~~Q NU20R~~
2	Szymon Mazur	Poland	19.64	Q
3	Bronson Osborn	United States	19.63	Q
4	Adrian Piperi	United States	19.57	Q
5	Marcus Thomsen	Norway	19.34	q
6	Cedric Trinemeier	Germany	19.22	q
7	Tobias Kohler	Germany	19.12	q
8	Wictor Petersson	Sweden	18.80	q
9	Jason van Rooyen	South Africa	18.79	q
10	Shehab Mohamed Abdalaziz	Egypt	18.65	q PB
11	Burger Lambrechts, Jr.	South Africa	18.44	q
12	Sanjae Lawrence	Jamaica	18.26	
13	Wout Zijlstra	Netherlands	18.20	
14	Paulius Gelazius	Lithuania	18.02	
15	Jose Lorenzo Hernandez	Spain	17.92	
16	Marius Constantin Musteata	Romania	17.91	
17	Shinichi Yukinaga	Japan	17.73	
18	Jose Miguel Ballivian	Chile	17.60	
19	Panu Tirkkonen	Finland	17.55	
20	Konstadinos Hatzimihail	Greece	17.49	
21	Kert Piirimäe	Estonia	17.45	
22	Ivan Kariuk	Ukraine	17.32	
23	Giorgi Mujaridze	Georgia	17.18	
24	Joseph Maxwell	Canada	16.84	
25	Odisseas Mouzenidis	Greece	16.66	
26	Kevin Nedrick	Jamaica	16.63	
27	Leonardo Fabbri	Italy	16.39	
	Raiarii Thompson	French Polynesia	NM	
	Jander Heil	Estonia	NM	
	Otoniel Badjana	Guinea-Bissau	DNS	

==== Details ====
With qualifying standard of 19.40 (Q) or at least the 12 best performers (q) advance to the Final

===== Group A =====
19 July

Rank	Name	Nationality	Attempts			Result	Notes
Rank	Name	Nationality	1	2	3	Result	Notes
~~1~~	Konrad Bukowiecki	Poland	~~21.73~~			~~21.73~~	Q
1	Adrian Piperi	United States	19.37	19.57		19.57	Q
2	Cedric Trinemeier	Germany	x	19.22		19.22	q
3	Wictor Petersson	Sweden	18.80	x	18.09	18.80	q
4	Burger Lambrechts, Jr.	South Africa	18.44	x	17.42	18.44	q
5	Sanjae Lawrence	Jamaica	x	18.26	17.92	18.26	
6	Paulius Gelazius	Lithuania	17.40	18.02	x	18.02	
7	Marius Constantin Musteata	Romania	x	17.91	17.58	17.91	
8	Shinichi Yukinaga	Japan	17.40	17.73	x	17.73	
9	Jose Miguel Ballivian	Chile	17.02	17.60	17.59	17.60	
10	Giorgi Mujaridze	Georgia	16.92	17.18	16.02	17.18	
11	Odisseas Mouzenidis	Greece	x	x	16.66	16.66	
12	Leonardo Fabbri	Italy	16.39	x	x	16.39	
	Raiarii Thompson	French Polynesia	x	x	x	NM	
	Jander Heil	Estonia	x	x	x	NM	

===== Group B =====
19 July

Rank	Name	Nationality	Attempts			Result	Notes
Rank	Name	Nationality	1	2	3	Result	Notes
~~1~~	~~Andrei Toader~~	Romania	~~21.26~~			~~21.26~~	~~Q NU20R~~
2	Szymon Mazur	Poland	17.99	19.64		19.64	Q
3	Bronson Osborn	United States	18.48	19.63		19.63	Q
4	Marcus Thomsen	Norway	18.01	18.47	19.34	19.34	q
5	Tobias Kohler	Germany	19.12	x	18.57	19.12	q
6	Jason van Rooyen	South Africa	18.53	18.79	x	18.79	q
7	Shehab Mohamed Abdalaziz	Egypt	16.02	17.00	18.65	18.65	q PB
8	Wout Zijlstra	Netherlands	17.79	17.98	18.20	18.20	
9	Jose Lorenzo Hernandez	Spain	x	x	17.92	17.92	
10	Panu Tirkkonen	Finland	17.55	x	x	17.55	
11	Konstadinos Hatzimihail	Greece	15.41	17.49	16.45	17.49	
12	Kert Piirimäe	Estonia	17.45	17.45	x	17.45	
13	Ivan Kariuk	Ukraine	16.47	17.32	17.07	17.32	
14	Joseph Maxwell	Canada	x	16.85	x	16.84	
15	Kevin Nedrick	Jamaica	16.63	x	x	16.63	
	Otoniel Badjana	Guinea-Bissau				DNS	
