= Athletics at the 2020 Summer Olympics – Men's shot put =

Men's shot put at the Games of the XXXII Olympiad
- Olympic Athletics
- Venue: Japan National Stadium
- Dates: 3 August 2021 (qualifying); 5 August 2021 (final)
- Competitors: 31 from 22 nations
- Winning distance: 23.30 OR

Medalists
1st place, gold medalist(s)		Ryan Crouser	United States
2nd place, silver medalist(s)		Joe Kovacs	United States
3rd place, bronze medalist(s)		Tom Walsh	New Zealand

The men's shot put event at the 2020 Summer Olympics took place between 3 and 5 August 2021 at the Japan National Stadium. Thirty-one athletes from 22 nations competed. For the first time in Olympic history, the same three competitors received the same medals in back-to-back editions of an individual event. Americans Ryan Crouser and Joe Kovacs and New Zealander Tom Walsh repeated their gold, silver, and bronze (respectively) performances from the 2016 Summer Olympics. They became the 15th, 16th, and 17th men to earn multiple medals in the shot put; Crouser was the 4th to repeat as champion.

== Background ==
This was the 29th appearance of the event, which is one of 12 athletics events to have been held at every Summer Olympics.

At the US Trials, Ryan Crouser broke the 29 year old world record by 25 centimetres. He was already the defending Olympic Champion. But the entire podium returned from Rio and silver medalist Joe Kovacs beat Crouser at the 2019 World Championships. Bronze medalist Thomas Walsh matched Crouser at the championships which Walsh won in 2017. Kovacs and Walsh were =#4 and #6 of all time respectively with their marks from that 2019 competition. #11 Darlan Romani, #17 Michał Haratyk, #19 Konrad Bukowiecki, #21 Bob Bertemes and #25 Tomáš Staněk were also in the field.

Bahrain made its men's shot put debut. The United States made its 28th appearance, most of any nation, having missed only the boycotted 1980 Games.

== Summary ==
Haratyk, Bukowiecki, Bertemes and Staněk didn't make the final.

On his first attempt at the final, Crouser threw 22.83 metres to improve upon his own Olympic Record from Rio. Romani threw 21.88 metres to take second for a few moments until Kovacs threw 22.19 metres. Crouser's second round throw improved the Olympic Record again, 22.93 metres. Only two other men had ever thrown that far, over 30 years before. Walsh got into the mix with 22.17 metres. After the throwers were re-ordered, Kovacs threw 22.65 metres to solidify his hold on silver. That looked significant because on his final attempt, Walsh dropped 22.47 metres, better than Kovacs' four other throws. Kovacs answered with 22.60 metres, not enough to catch Crouser. So with gold assured, Crouser wound up for one more throw, 23.30 m (76 ft 5 1/4 in); the second farthest throw in history, his third Olympic Record of the series and just 7 centimetres short of his month-old world record. Every one of Crouser's 6 throw series was farther than all but ten men have ever thrown. Crouser joined Ralph Rose (1904 & 1908), Parry O'Brien (1952 & 1956) (also Americans) and Tomasz Majewski of Poland (2008 & 2012), as the only men to defend their Olympic title in the shot put. For the first time in Olympic history the podium was a repeat of the previous Games, with Kovacs silver and Walsh bronze.

== Qualification ==
A National Olympic Committee (NOC) could enter up to 3 qualified athletes in the men's shot put event if all athletes meet the entry standard or qualify by ranking during the qualifying period. (The limit of 3 has been in place since the 1930 Olympic Congress.) The qualifying standard is 21.10 metres. This standard was "set for the sole purpose of qualifying athletes with exceptional performances unable to qualify through the IAAF World Rankings pathway." The world rankings, based on the average of the best five results for the athlete over the qualifying period and weighted by the importance of the meet, will then be used to qualify athletes until the cap of 32 is reached.

The qualifying period was originally from 1 May 2019 to 29 June 2020. Due to the COVID-19 pandemic, the period was suspended from 6 April 2020 to 30 November 2020, with the end date extended to 29 June 2021. The world rankings period start date was also changed from 1 May 2019 to 30 June 2020; athletes who had met the qualifying standard during that time were still qualified, but those using world rankings would not be able to count performances during that time. The qualifying time standards could be obtained at various meetings during the given period with the approval of the IAAF. Both outdoor and indoor meets are eligible. The most recent Area Championships may be counted in the ranking, even if not during the qualifying period.

NOCs can also use their universality place—each NOC can enter one male athlete regardless of time if they had no male athletes meeting the entry standard for an athletics event—in the shot put.

Entry number: 32. No ranking necessary to complete the field.

Qualification standard	No. of athletes	NOC	Nominated athletes
Entry standard – 21.10	3	Italy	Leonardo Fabbri; Nick Ponzio; Zane Weir
Entry standard – 21.10	3	United States	Ryan Crouser; Joe Kovacs; Payton Otterdahl
Entry standard – 21.10	2	Egypt	Mostafa Amr Hassan; Mohamed Magdi Hamza
Entry standard – 21.10	2	Georgia	~~Benik Abrahamyan~~; Giorgi Mujaridze
Entry standard – 21.10	2	New Zealand	Jacko Gill; Tom Walsh
Entry standard – 21.10	2	Poland	Konrad Bukowiecki; Michał Haratyk
Entry standard – 21.10	2	Serbia	Asmir Kolašinac; Armin Sinančević
Entry standard – 21.10	2	South Africa	Kyle Blignaut; Jason van Rooyen
Entry standard – 21.10	1	Bahrain	Abdelrahman Mahmoud
Entry standard – 21.10	1	Bosnia and Herzegovina	Mesud Pezer
Entry standard – 21.10	1	Brazil	Darlan Romani
Entry standard – 21.10	1	British Virgin Islands	~~Eldred Henry~~
Entry standard – 21.10	1	Canada	Tim Nedow
Entry standard – 21.10	1	Croatia	Filip Mihaljević
Entry standard – 21.10	1	Czech Republic	Tomáš Staněk
Entry standard – 21.10	1	Great Britain	Scott Lincoln
Entry standard – 21.10	1	India	Tajinderpal Singh Toor
Entry standard – 21.10	1	Luxembourg	Bob Bertemes
Entry standard – 21.10	1	Nigeria	Chukwuebuka Enekwechi
Entry standard – 21.10	1	Portugal	Francisco Belo
Entry standard – 21.10	0	ROC	~~Aleksandr Lesnoy~~
Entry standard – 21.10	1	Romania	Andrei Rares Toader
Entry standard – 21.10	1	Sweden	Wictor Petersson
Entry standard – 21.10	1	Ukraine	Ihor Musiyenko
World ranking	0		
Total	32		

== Competition format ==
The 2020 competition continued to use the two-round format with divided final introduced in 1936. The qualifying round gave each competitor three throws to achieve a qualifying distance (not yet set; 2016 used 20.65 metres); if fewer than 12 men did so, the top 12 would advance. The final provided each thrower with three throws; the top eight throwers received an additional three throws for a total of six, with the best to count (qualifying round throws were not considered for the final).

== Records ==
Prior to this competition, the existing world, Olympic, and area records were as follows.

World record	Ryan Crouser (USA)	23.37	Eugene, United States	18 June 2021
Olympic record	Ryan Crouser (USA)	22.52	Rio de Janeiro, Brazil	18 August 2016

Area	Distance (m)	Athlete	Nation
Africa (records)	21.97	Janus Robberts	South Africa
Asia (records)	21.49	TajinderPal Toor	India
Europe (records)	23.06	Ulf Timmermann	East Germany
North, Central America and Caribbean (records)	23.37 WR	Ryan Crouser	United States
Oceania (records)	22.90	Tom Walsh	New Zealand
South America (records)	22.61	Darlan Romani	Brazil

The following record was established during the competition:

Date	Event	Athlete	Nation	Distance (m)	Record
August 5	Final	Ryan Crouser	United States	23.30	OR

== Schedule ==
All times are Japan Standard Time (UTC+9)

The men's shot put took place over two separate days.

Date	Time	Round
Tuesday, 3 August 2021	19:00	Qualifying
Thursday, 5 August 2021	9:00	Final

== Results ==
=== Qualifying ===
Qualification Rules: Qualifying performance 21.20 (Q) or at least 12 best performers (q) advance to the Final.

Rank	Group	Athlete	Nation	1	2	3	Distance	Notes
1	B	Ryan Crouser	United States	22.05	—	—	22.05	Q
2	A	Tom Walsh	New Zealand	x	20.38	21.49	21.49	Q
3	B	Mesud Pezer	Bosnia and Herzegovina	20.41	21.33	—	21.33	Q
4	A	Darlan Romani	Brazil	21.00	21.31	—	21.31	Q
5	B	Zane Weir	Italy	20.84	21.25	—	21.25	Q, PB
6	A	Mostafa Amr Hassan	Egypt	x	20.65	21.23	21.23	Q, SB
7	B	Chukwuebuka Enekwechi	Nigeria	20.53	21.16	20.95	21.16	q
8	B	Kyle Blignaut	South Africa	20.30	20.97	20.56	20.97	q
9	B	Jacko Gill	New Zealand	20.65	20.52	20.96	20.96	q
10	A	Armin Sinančević	Serbia	20.50	20.96	x	20.96	q
11	A	Joe Kovacs	United States	20.81	20.93	20.81	20.93	q
12	A	Payton Otterdahl	United States	19.56	20.28	20.90	20.90	q
13	B	Michał Haratyk	Poland	20.58	20.86	20.72	20.86	
14	B	Leonardo Fabbri	Italy	19.42	20.80	x	20.80	
15	B	Filip Mihaljević	Croatia	x	20.09	20.67	20.67	
16	A	Francisco Belo	Portugal	x	20.58	20.24	20.58	
17	A	Tomáš Staněk	Czech Republic	20.23	20.47	19.78	20.47	
18	B	Scott Lincoln	Great Britain	20.42	19.60	x	20.42	
19	A	Jason van Rooyen	South Africa	18.92	20.06	20.29	20.29	
20	A	Nick Ponzio	Italy	x	20.28	x	20.28	
21	B	Bob Bertemes	Luxembourg	20.14	x	20.16	20.16	
22	A	Abdelrahman Mahmoud	Bahrain	18.95	20.14	19.93	20.14	
23	A	Konrad Bukowiecki	Poland	20.01	x	19.44	20.01	
24	A	Tajinderpal Singh Toor	India	19.99	x	x	19.99	
25	B	Mohamed Magdi Hamza	Egypt	19.33	x	19.82	19.82	
26	A	Andrei Toader	Romania	19.81	x	19.41	19.81	
27	A	Giorgi Mujaridze	Georgia	18.71	19.76	19.55	19.76	
28	B	Wictor Petersson	Sweden	19.64	x	19.73	19.73	
29	B	Asmir Kolašinac	Serbia	x	19.68	x	19.68	
30	B	Ihor Musiyenko	Ukraine	19.07	19.42	19.56	19.56	
31	A	Tim Nedow	Canada	x	19.27	19.42	19.42	

=== Final ===
Rank	Order	Athlete	Nation	1	2	3	4	5	6	Distance	Notes
1st place, gold medalist(s)	7	Ryan Crouser	United States	22.83	22.93	22.86	22.74	22.54	23.30	23.30	OR
2nd place, silver medalist(s)	11	Joe Kovacs	United States	22.19	20.95	21.95	22.65	22.29	22.60	22.65	
3rd place, bronze medalist(s)	4	Tom Walsh	New Zealand	21.09	22.17	x	21.37	22.18	22.47	22.47	SB
4	10	Darlan Romani	Brazil	21.88	21.22	20.96	x	x	20.70	21.88	SB
5	3	Zane Weir	Italy	20.85	20.25	20.68	21.40	21.41	x	21.41	PB
6	9	Kyle Blignaut	South Africa	20.29	x	21.00	20.96	20.46	x	21.00	
7	8	Armin Sinančević	Serbia	20.89	x	x	20.44	x	x	20.89	
8	6	Mostafa Amr Hassan	Egypt	20.51	20.73	x	x	20.63	20.73	20.73	
9	12	Jacko Gill	New Zealand	x	20.71	20.71	Did not advance			20.71	
10	5	Payton Otterdahl	United States	20.32	x	x	Did not advance			20.32	
11	1	Mesud Pezer	Bosnia and Herzegovina	x	x	20.08	Did not advance			20.08	
12	2	Chukwuebuka Enekwechi	Nigeria	x	18.87	19.74	Did not advance			19.74	
