= Athletics at the 2024 Summer Olympics – Men's shot put =

Men's shot put at the Games of the XXXIII Olympiad
- Venue: Stade de France, Paris, France
- Date: 2 August 2024 (qualification) 3 August 2024 (final)
- Competitors: 31 from 24 nations
- Winning distance: 22.90 m

Medalists
1st place, gold medalist(s)		Ryan Crouser	United States
2nd place, silver medalist(s)		Joe Kovacs	United States
3rd place, bronze medalist(s)		Rajindra Campbell	Jamaica

The men's shot put at the 2024 Summer Olympics was held in Paris, France, on 2 and 3 August 2024. This was the 30th time that the event is contested at the Summer Olympics.

== Summary ==
Since 2016, Ryan Crouser has virtually owned this event. Two successive Olympic Championships, two world records, two world championships and an indoor championship he added earlier in the season. Crouser was a world champion even back to the 2009 youth division. Crouser had been beaten before, most notably at the 2019 World Championships by Joe Kovacs by a single centimeter, in what might have been the greatest shot put competition ever. With Crouser nursing an injury the entire outdoor season, Kovacs beat him again at the U.S. Olympic Trials a month earlier. Kovacs had a history of finishing on the podium of every major championship since the 2015 World Championships, which he won. Crouser and Kovacs are the top two shot putters of all time. Earlier in the season, Leonardo Fabbri threw 22.95m to become #5. Also in the competition were #7 Tom Walsh, #13 Payton Otterdahl and #25 Rajindra Campbell.

In the qualifying round Tomáš Staněk, Otterdahl and Crouser were one and done, reaching the automatic qualifying mark of 21.35 on their first attempt. Jacko Gill and Walsh needed a second attempt to make it, while Fabbri took all three until he got off a 21.76m that led all qualifiers. Kovacs only managed 21.24m in three attempts, but that was enough to qualify seventh. Campbell had to rely on a first attempt 21.05m to squeak into the finals in tenth after two successive fouls.

As the rain began to fall, Otterdahl got the first legal throw 21.39m. Kovacs got the next, 21.69m. Crouser threw almost a meter farther, 22.64m on his first attempt to put the three Americans in the top three positions after the first round. In the second round, Otterdahl improved to second position at 21.98m. After Crouser improved to 22.69m, Campbell tossed a 22.15m to move ahead of Otterdahl. In the third round, Otterdahl made a slight improvement to 22.01m but remained in third. Then Crouser made a bigger improvement to 22.90 m (75 ft 1 1/2 in). Bronze medalist at the last two Olympics, competing with an injured groin strain, Walsh fouled his third attempt in a row and did not move into the final rounds. In heavier rain, none of the competitors could stay in the ring. The trend continued through the fifth round and into the sixth. 24 successive attempts only had three inferior legal throws. In fourth place, in bad conditions, Kovacs used his final attempt to throw 22.15m to equal Campbell. And because Kovacs had a better second best throw, he had rocketed into second place. Now off the podium, Otterdahl got off his best throw 22.03m, but it wouldn't catch Campbell. Campbell still had one last chance to improve only enough to beat Kovacs' second best 21.71m, but Campbell fouled. Already the three time gold medalist, Crouser accepted congratulations and did not step into the ring again. The winning throw equaled the 24th best in history, but Crouser had 14 better throws on that list already.

== Background ==
The men's shot put has been present on the Olympic athletics programme since the inaugural edition in 1896.

Global records before the 2024 Summer Olympics
Record	Athlete (Nation)	Distance (m)	Location	Date
World record	Ryan Crouser (USA)	23.56	Los Angeles, United States	27 May 2023
Olympic record	Ryan Crouser (USA)	23.30	Tokyo, Japan	5 August 2021
World leading	Joe Kovacs (USA)	23.13	Eugene, United States	25 May 2024

Area records before the 2024 Summer Olympics
Area Record	Athlete (Nation)	Distance (m)
Africa (records)	Janus Robberts (RSA)	21.97
Asia (records)	Mohammed Tolo (KSA)	21.80
Europe (records)	Ulf Timmermann (GDR)	23.06
North, Central America and Caribbean (records)	Ryan Crouser (USA)	23.56 WR
Oceania (records)	Tom Walsh (NZL)	22.90
South America (records)	Darlan Romani (BRA)	22.61

== Qualification ==
For the men's shot put event, the qualification period was between 1 July 2023 and 30 June 2024. 32 athletes were able to qualify for the event, with a maximum of three athletes per nation, by throwing the entry standard of 21.50 m or further or by their World Athletics Ranking for this event.

== Results ==
=== Qualification ===
The qualification was held on 2 August, starting at 20:10 (UTC+2). 32 athletes qualified for the first round by qualification time or world ranking. Qualification: 21.35 (Q) or at least 12 best performers (q) advance to the final.

Rank	Group	Athlete	Nation	1	2	3	Distance	Notes
1	A	Leonardo Fabbri	Italy	20.44	x	21.76	21.76	Q
2	A	Tomáš Staněk	Czech Republic	21.61	—	—	21.61	Q, SB
3	B	Payton Otterdahl	United States	21.52	—	—	21.52	Q
4	A	Ryan Crouser	United States	21.49	—	—	21.49	Q
5	B	Tom Walsh	New Zealand	20.65	21.48	—	21.48	Q
6	A	Jacko Gill	New Zealand	21.14	21.35	—	21.35	Q
7	B	Joe Kovacs	United States	20.65	21.06	21.24	21.24	q
8	B	Uziel Muñoz	Mexico	20.69	20.43	21.22	21.22	q
9	B	Chukwuebuka Enekwechi	Nigeria	21.13	21.00	x	21.13	q
10	A	Rajindra Campbell	Jamaica	21.05	x	x	21.05	q
11	B	Zane Weir	Italy	20.29	21.00	x	21.00	q
12	A	Marcus Thomsen	Norway	20.81	x	20.33	20.81	q
13	B	Kyle Blignaut	South Africa	x	20.03	20.78	20.78	
14	A	Filip Mihaljević	Croatia	20.09	20.04	20.75	20.75	
15	B	Mohammed Tolo	Saudi Arabia	20.63	x	20.65	20.65	
16	A	Tsanko Arnaudov	Portugal	20.02	19.80	20.31	20.31	
17	A	Bob Bertemes	Luxembourg	20.27	x	x	20.27	
18	B	Andrei Toader	Romania	20.24	20.00	20.10	20.24	
19	B	Michał Haratyk	Poland	19.41	19.87	19.94	19.94	
20	B	Mostafa Hassan	Egypt	19.70	x	x	19.70	
21	B	Scott Lincoln	Great Britain	x	x	19.69	19.69	
22	B	Roman Kokoshko	Ukraine	x	19.36	19.22	19.36	
23	A	Nazareno Sasia	Argentina	19.33	x	19.06	19.33	
24	B	Armin Sinančević	Serbia	x	19.31	x	19.31	
25	A	Mohamed Khalifa	Egypt	x	19.27	x	19.27	
26	A	Mesud Pezer	Bosnia and Herzegovina	19.01	19.03	18.94	19.03	
27	A	Eric Favors	Ireland	19.02	18.38	18.86	19.02	
28	A	Konrad Bukowiecki	Poland	x	18.34	18.83	18.83	
29	A	Tajinderpal Singh Toor	India	18.05	x	x	18.05	
	A	Welington Morais	Brazil	x	x	x	NM	
	B	Francisco Belo	Portugal	x	x	x	NM	

=== Final ===
The final was held on 3 August, starting at 19:35 (UTC+2) in the evening.

Rank	Order	Athlete	Nation	1	2	3	4	5	6	Distance	Notes
1st place, gold medalist(s)	6	Ryan Crouser	United States	22.64	22.69	22.90	x	x	—	22.90	SB
2nd place, silver medalist(s)	4	Joe Kovacs	United States	21.69	x	21.71	x	x	22.15	22.15	
3rd place, bronze medalist(s)	8	Rajindra Campbell	Jamaica	20.00	22.15	x	x	x	x	22.15	
4	2	Payton Otterdahl	United States	21.39	21.98	22.01	x	x	22.03	22.03	
5	11	Leonardo Fabbri	Italy	x	20.96	x	21.70	x	x	21.70	
6	9	Chukwuebuka Enekwechi	Nigeria	20.58	21.42	21.01	x	x	x	21.42	
7	3	Jacko Gill	New Zealand	x	20.81	21.15	x	19.23	20.47	21.15	
8	10	Uziel Muñoz	Mexico	20.68	20.88	20.80	x	20.29	x	20.88	
9	1	Marcus Thomsen	Norway	x	20.58	20.67	Did not advance			20.67	
10	5	Tomáš Staněk	Czech Republic	20.31	20.37	x	Did not advance			20.37	
11	7	Zane Weir	Italy	x	20.24	x	Did not advance			20.24	
12	12	Tom Walsh	New Zealand	x	x	x	Did not advance			NM	
