= 2023 World Athletics Championships – Men's shot put =

Men's shot put at the 2023 World Championships
- Venue: National Athletics Centre
- Dates: 19 August
- Competitors: 37 from 26 nations
- Winning distance: 23.51

Medalists
gold medal	Ryan Crouser	United States
silver medal	Leonardo Fabbri	Italy
bronze medal	Joe Kovacs	United States

The men's shot put at the 2023 World Athletics Championships was held at the National Athletics Centre in Budapest on 19 August 2023. The winning margin was 1.17 metres which as of 2024 is the only time the men's shot put has been won by more than a metre at these championships.

== Summary ==
With two Olympic Championships and multiple world record improvements, defending champion Ryan Crouser was the clear favorite, but Crouser revealed on Instagram that pain in his leg over the previous two weeks turned out to be two blood clots. With the advice of his doctor, he was able to take anticoagulants to mitigate the danger of his traveling to Hungary for these championships. His single throw in the preliminary round was tentative, 21.48m barely sufficient for an automatic qualifier in eighth place.

Crouser was the first thrower in the finals. His first throw of the competition was 22.63m. Only two people in this competition had ever thrown that far. With a 21.55m Joe Kovacs moved into second place, followed immediately by World Indoor Champion Darlan Romani throwing 21.31m to move into third. Crouser led off the second round with a 22.98m improvement on his own Championship Record. Tom Walsh moved into second with a 21.69m with his New Zealand teammate Jacko Gill lurking in fourth with 21.46m. In the third round Gill improved to second with a 21.76m, only to have Walsh also improve to 21.93m. He was followed immediately by Leonardo Fabbri throwing a personal best 22.34m to take everybody but Crouser down a notch. In the fifth round, Kovacs put out a 22.12m to move back to third place, the next thrower Walsh couldn't quite answer with a 22.05m. On their final throw, nobody could improve so by the time Crouser got to the ring, his championship defense was guaranteed. With nothing on the line, Crouser let loose a 23.51 m (77 ft 1 1/2 in) for another Championship Record, along with being the #2 throw in history, just 5cm short of the record he set at UCLA earlier in the season.

== Records ==
Before the competition records were as follows:

Record	Athlete & Nat.	Perf.	Location	Date
World record	Ryan Crouser (USA)	23.56 m	Los Angeles, United States	27 May 2023
Championship record	Ryan Crouser (USA)	22.94 m	Eugene, Oregon	17 July 2022
World Leading	Ryan Crouser (USA)	23.56 m	Los Angeles, United States	27 May 2023
African Record	Janus Robberts (RSA)	21.97 m	Eugene, United States	2 June 2001
Asian Record	Tajinderpal Singh Toor (IND)	21.77 m	Bhubaneswar, India	19 June 2023
North, Central American and Caribbean record	Ryan Crouser (USA)	23.56 m	Los Angeles, United States	27 May 2023
South American Record	Darlan Romani (BRA)	22.61 m	Stanford, United States	30 June 2019
European Record	Ulf Timmermann (GDR)	23.06 m	Chania, Greece	22 May 1988
Oceanian record	Tom Walsh (NZL)	22.90 m	Doha, Qatar	5 October 2019

The following records were established during the competition:

Date	Event	Name	Nationality	Distance	Record
19 August	Final	Ryan Crouser	USA	23.51	CR

== Qualification standard ==
The standard to qualify automatically for entry was 21.40.

== Schedule ==
The event schedule, in local time (CEST), was as follows:

Date	Time	Round
19 August	10:30	Qualification
19 August	20:37	Final

== Results ==
=== Qualification ===
Qualification: Qualifying Performance 21.20 (Q) or at least 12 best performers (q) advanced to the final.

Rank	Group	Name	Nationality	Round			Mark	Notes
Rank	Group	Name	Nationality	1	2	3	Mark	Notes
1	A	Darlan Romani	Brazil	22.37			22.37	Q, SB
2	A	Zane Weir	Italy	20.81	21.82		21.82	Q
3	B	Tom Walsh	New Zealand	21.73			21.73	Q
4	B	Joe Kovacs	United States	21.59			21.59	Q
5	B	Payton Otterdahl	United States	21.16	21.54		21.54	Q
6	A	Jacko Gill	New Zealand	20.83	21.49		21.49	Q
7	A	Ryan Crouser	United States	21.48			21.48	Q
8	A	Filip Mihaljević	Croatia	21.10	20.03		21.10	q
9	B	Armin Sinančević	Serbia	20.39	x	20.92	20.92	q
10	A	Rajindra Campbell	Jamaica	19.83	x	20.83	20.83	q
11	B	Mostafa Amr Hassan	Egypt	20.62	20.81	x	20.81	q
12	B	Leonardo Fabbri	Italy	19.41	x	20.74	20.74	q
13	A	Chukwuebuka Enekwechi	Nigeria	x	20.41	20.68	20.68	
14	A	Mohamed Magdi Hamza	Egypt	20.26	20.68	x	20.68	
15	B	Uziel Muñoz	Mexico	20.62	19.96	20.42	20.62	
16	B	Tomáš Staněk	Czech Republic	x	20.41	19.91	20.41	
17	B	Welington Morais	Brazil	20.30	19.87	19.95	20.30	
18	A	Scott Lincoln	Great Britain & N.I.	20.18	19.77	20.22	20.22	
19	A	Asmir Kolašinac	Serbia	20.01	x	19.95	20.01	
20	A	Josh Awotunde	United States	19.98	x	x	19.98	
21	B	Marcus Thomsen	Norway	19.97	x	x	19.97	
22	A	Mesud Pezer	Bosnia and Herzegovina	19.40	19.26	19.86	19.86	
23	A	Eric Favors	Ireland	19.34	19.52	19.65	19.65	
24	A	Burger Lambrechts Jr.	South Africa	19.46	19.52	x	19.52	
25	A	Michał Haratyk	Poland	19.27	19.49	19.51	19.51	
26	B	Nazareno Sasia	Argentina	x	x	19.51	19.51	
27	A	Francisco Belo	Portugal	19.24	x	x	19.24	
28	B	Konrad Bukowiecki	Poland	18.25	19.21	x	19.21	
29	A	Roman Kokoshko	Ukraine	18.56	19.09	19.17	19.17	
30	B	Tsanko Arnaudov	Portugal	x	19.03	19.17	19.17	
31	B	Odysseas Mouzenidis	Greece	18.48	x	19.08	19.08	
32	B	Fred Moudani-Likibi	France	x	x	18.88	18.88	
33	A	Mark Bujnowski	Canada	17.71	18.57	18.84	18.84	
34	B	Kyle Blignaut	South Africa	17.89	18.82	x	18.82	
35	A	Balázs Tóth	Hungary	17.37	x	17.27	17.37	
	B	Bob Bertemes	Luxembourg	x	x	x	NM	
	B	Andrei Toader	Romania	x	x	x	NM	

=== Final ===
The final started on August 19 at 20:40.

Rank	Name	Nationality	Round						Mark	Notes
Rank	Name	Nationality	1	2	3	4	5	6	Mark	Notes
1st place, gold medalist(s)	Ryan Crouser	United States	22.63	22.98	22.28	x	x	23.51	23.51	CR
2nd place, silver medalist(s)	Leonardo Fabbri	Italy	x	21.26	22.34	x	x	21.22	22.34	PB
3rd place, bronze medalist(s)	Joe Kovacs	United States	21.55	x	21.23	21.88	22.12	21.07	22.12	
4	Tom Walsh	New Zealand	x	21.69	21.93	21.40	22.05	21.51	22.05	
5	Payton Otterdahl	United States	20.08	20.47	21.01	21.78	21.86	21.73	21.86	
6	Jacko Gill	New Zealand	20.33	21.46	21.76	21.33	21.02	21.28	21.76	
7	Filip Mihaljević	Croatia	20.32	20.32	20.88	21.57	x	21.44	21.57	
8	Darlan Romani	Brazil	21.31	21.10	x	x	21.41	x	21.41	
9	Armin Sinančević	Serbia	20.78	20.18	x				20.78	
10	Mostafa Amr Hassan	Egypt	x	20.14	20.17				20.17	
11	Zane Weir	Italy	x	19.99	x				19.99	
	Rajindra Campbell	Jamaica	x	x	x				NM	
