= 2019 European Athletics U23 Championships – Men's shot put =

Athletics

The men's shot put event at the 2019 European Athletics U23 Championships will be held in Gävle, Sweden, at Gavlehov Stadium Park on 11–12 July 2019.

== Medalists ==
Gold	Silver	Bronze
Konrad Bukowiecki; Poland	Leonardo Fabbri; Italy	Wictor Petersson; Sweden

== Results ==
=== Qualification ===
Qualification rule: 18.80 (Q) or the 12 best results (q) qualified for the final.

Rank	Group	Name	Nationality	#1	#2	#3	Results	Notes
1	A	Konrad Bukowiecki	Poland	20.44			20.44	Q
2	B	Marcus Thomsen	Norway	x	19.94		19.94	Q, PB
3	B	Wictor Petersson	Sweden	19.76			19.76	Q
4	B	Leonardo Fabbri	Italy	18.39	19.69		19.69	Q
5	A	Giorgi Mujaridze	Georgia	18.57	18.33	19.41	19.41	Q
6	A	Dzmitry Karpuk	Belarus	x	18.83		18.83	Q
7	B	Odisseas Mouzenidis	Greece	18.75	18.47	18.20	18.75	q
8	A	Cedric Trinemeier	Germany	18.63	x	18.71	18.71	q
9	B	Kert Piirimäe	Estonia	18.39	18.39	x	18.39	q, PB
10	B	Szymon Mazur	Poland	17.25	17.95	18.32	18.32	q
11	B	Valentin Moll	Germany	17.71	x	18.31	18.31	q
12	A	Jander Heil	Estonia	17.10	x	18.30	18.30	q
13	B	Marius Constan Musteata	Romania	18.04	x	x	18.04	
14	A	Oleksandr Shylivskyy	Ukraine	17.03	17.76	x	17.76	
15	A	Jesper Arbinge	Sweden	17.23	x	17.71	17.71	
16	B	Eero Ahola	Finland	17.09	16.69	17.66	17.66	
17	B	Veljko Nedeljković	Serbia	17.17	x	17.18	17.18	
18	A	Viktor Klymuk	Ukraine	16.86	17.16	16.98	17.16	
19	A	Bogdan Zdravković	Serbia	17.13	x	x	17.13	
20	A	Samuli Kyrönviita	Finland	17.02	16.88	16.93	17.02	
21	B	Sven Poelmann	Netherlands	16.94	16.61	x	16.94	
22	B	Paulius Gelažius	Lithuania	16.92	x	x	16.92	
23	A	Stefan Wieland	Switzerland	16.83	16.83	x	16.83	
24	B	Panu Tirkkonen	Finland	x	x	16.69	16.69	
25	B	Dmytro Manzhay	Ukraine	15.73	x	16.59	16.59	
26	A	Anu Awonusi	Ireland	x	15.77	x	15.77	
27	A	Arminas Čečkauskas	Lithuania	x	x	15.01	15.01	
	A	Andrei Toader	Romania				DNS	

=== Final ===
Rank	Name	Nationality	#1	#2	#3	#4	#5	#6	Result	Notes
1st place, gold medalist(s)	Konrad Bukowiecki	Poland	19.16	x	20.79	21.51	21.38	x	21.51	
2nd place, silver medalist(s)	Leonardo Fabbri	Italy	19.72	x	20.39	19.98	20.22	20.50	20.50	
3rd place, bronze medalist(s)	Wictor Petersson	Sweden	19.12	19.41	x	19.53	18.26	18.96	19.53	
4	Marcus Thomsen	Norway	17.61	18.93	x	19.41	x	19.00	19.41	
5	Giorgi Mujaridze	Georgia	18.48	19.33	18.65	x	19.26	x	19.33	
6	Dzmitriy Karpuk	Belarus	18.40	19.29	18.54	19.01	18.90	19.22	19.29	
7	Odisseas Mouzenidis	Greece	18.19	18.42	18.99	x	x	17.99	18.99	
8	Cedric Trinemeier	Germany	18.46	17.62	18.58	18.98	x	x	18.98	
9	Jander Heil	Estonia	17.19	18.39	18.36				18.39	
10	Valentin Moll	Germany	17.00	x	18.25				18.25	
11	Szymon Mazur	Poland	17.65	18.16	17.79				18.16	
12	Kert Piirimäe	Estonia	17.57	x	17.62				17.62	
