= 2022 European Athletics Championships – Men's shot put =

Men's shot put at the 2022 European Athletics Championships
- Venue: Olympiastadion
- Location: Munich
- Dates: August 15
- Competitors: 22 from 17 nations
- Winning distance: 21.88 m

Medalists
| gold medal | Filip Mihaljević | Croatia |
| silver medal | Armin Sinančević | Serbia |
| bronze medal | Tomáš Staněk | Czech Republic |

The men's shot put at the 2022 European Athletics Championships took place at the Olympiastadion on 15 August.

== Records ==
Standing records prior to the 2022 European Athletics Championships
| World record | Ryan Crouser (USA) | 23.37 m | Eugene, United States | 18 June 2021 |
| European record | Ulf Timmermann (GDR) | 23.06 m | Chania, Greece | 22 May 1988 |
| Championship record | Werner Günthör (SUI) | 22.22 m | Stuttgart, West Germany | 28 August 1986 |
| World Leading | Ryan Crouser (USA) | 23.12 m | Eugene, United States | 25 June 2022 |
| Europe Leading | Zane Weir (ITA) | 21.99 m | Leiria, Portugal | 13 March 2022 |

== Schedule ==
| Date | Time | Round |
|---|---|---|
| 15 August 2022 | 10:00 | Qualification |
| 15 August 2022 | 20:58 | Final |

All times are local times (UTC+2)

== Results ==
=== Qualification ===
Qualification: 21.15 m (Q) or best 12 performers (q)

| Rank | Group | Name | Nationality | #1 | #2 | #3 | Result | Note |
|---|---|---|---|---|---|---|---|---|
| 1 | A | Armin Sinančević | Serbia | x | x | 21.82 | 21.82 | Q, SB |
| 2 | A | Tomáš Staněk | Czech Republic | 21.39 | | | 21.39 | Q |
| 3 | B | Konrad Bukowiecki | Poland | 18.97 | x | 20.96 | 20.96 | q |
| 4 | B | Michał Haratyk | Poland | 19.90 | 20.26 | 20.85 | 20.85 | q |
| 5 | A | Scott Lincoln | Great Britain | 20.28 | 20.64 | 20.36 | 20.64 | q |
| 6 | A | Andrei Toader | Romania | 20.12 | 20.23 | 20.50 | 20.50 | q |
| 7 | A | Nick Ponzio | Italy | 20.04 | 20.44 | 20.38 | 20.44 | q |
| 8 | A | Marcus Thomsen | Norway | 20.22 | 20.32 | 20.25 | 20.32 | q |
| 9 | B | Filip Mihaljević | Croatia | 19.12 | 20.00 | 20.30 | 20.30 | q |
| 10 | B | Leonardo Fabbri | Italy | 19.16 | 20.27 | – | 20.27 | q |
| 11 | B | Asmir Kolašinac | Serbia | 19.99 | x | 19.74 | 19.99 | q |
| 12 | B | Simon Bayer | Germany | 17.60 | 19.82 | 19.91 | 19.91 | q |
| 13 | B | Roman Kokoshko | Ukraine | x | 19.86 | 19.83 | 19.86 | |
| 14 | B | Bob Bertemes | Luxembourg | 19.10 | x | 19.77 | 19.77 | |
| 15 | A | Eric Favors | Ireland | 19.34 | 19.38 | 19.71 | 19.71 | |
| 16 | A | Carlos Tobalina | Spain | 19.12 | x | 19.58 | 19.58 | |
| 17 | A | Giorgi Mujaridze | Georgia | x | 19.36 | 19.43 | 19.43 | |
| 18 | B | Tsanko Arnaudov | Portugal | 19.42 | x | x | 19.42 | |
| 19 | A | Sebastiano Bianchetti | Italy | x | 19.37 | x | 19.37 | |
| 20 | B | Alperen Karahan | Turkey | 19.25 | x | x | 19.25 | |
| 21 | A | Jakub Szyszkowski | Poland | 19.19 | x | 19.15 | 19.19 | |
| 22 | B | Muhamet Ramadani | Kosovo | x | 18.26 | 17.77 | 18.26 | |

=== Final ===
The final was started on 15 August at 21:00.

| Rank | Name | Nationality | #1 | #2 | #3 | #4 | #5 | #6 | Result | Note |
|---|---|---|---|---|---|---|---|---|---|---|
| 1st place, gold medalist(s) | Filip Mihaljević | Croatia | 20.37 | 21.05 | 21.27 | 21.53 | 21.04 | 21.88 | 21.88 | SB |
| 2nd place, silver medalist(s) | Armin Sinančević | Serbia | 21.07 | x | 21.24 | 20.97 | 21.39 | 21.32 | 21.39 | |
| 3rd place, bronze medalist(s) | Tomáš Staněk | Czech Republic | x | 21.05 | 21.26 | x | 20.62 | 20.59 | 21.26 | |
| 4 | Nick Ponzio | Italy | 20.55 | 20.96 | 20.78 | 20.55 | 20.98 | 20.66 | 20.98 | |
| 5 | Michał Haratyk | Poland | 20.39 | x | x | 20.85 | x | 20.90 | 20.90 | |
| 6 | Konrad Bukowiecki | Poland | 20.56 | 19.30 | 19.99 | 20.02 | 20.74 | 20.47 | 20.74 | |
| 7 | Leonardo Fabbri | Italy | x | 20.01 | 19.91 | x | 20.43 | 20.72 | 20.72 | SB |
| 8 | Asmir Kolašinac | Serbia | 19.64 | 19.65 | 19.93 | 20.09 | 20.14 | 20.15 | 20.15 | |
| 9 | Marcus Thomsen | Norway | 19.36 | 19.91 | x | | | | 19.91 | |
| 10 | Scott Lincoln | Great Britain | 19.81 | 19.90 | x | | | | 19.90 | |
| 11 | Simon Bayer | Germany | 19.58 | 19.83 | x | | | | 19.83 | |
| 12 | Andrei Toader | Romania | x | 19.15 | x | | | | 19.15 | |
