= 2021 European Athletics U23 Championships – Men's shot put =

Men's shot put at the 2021 European Athletics U23 Championships
- Venue: Kadriorg Stadium, Tallinn
- Dates: 8 July
- Competitors: 28 from 16 nations
- Winning distance: 20.33

Medalists
| gold medal | Dzmitry Karpuk | Belarus |
| silver medal | Alperen Karahan | Turkey |
| bronze medal | Odysseas Mouzenidis | Greece |

The men's shot put event at the 2021 European Athletics U23 Championships was held in Tallinn, Estonia, at Kadriorg Stadium on 8 July.

== Records ==
Prior to the competition, the records were as follows:

| European U23 record | Konrad Bukowiecki (POL) | 22.25 | Chorzów, Poland | 14 September 2019 |
| Championship U23 record | Konrad Bukowiecki (POL) | 21.59 | Bydgoszcz, Poland | 14 July 2017 |

== Results ==
=== Qualification ===
Qualification rule: 19.00 (Q) or the 12 best results (q) qualified for the final.

| Rank | Group | Name | Nationality | #1 | #2 | #3 | Results | Notes |
|---|---|---|---|---|---|---|---|---|
| 1 | A | Dzmitry Karpuk | Belarus | 19.28 | | | 19.28 | Q |
| 2 | A | Odysseas Mouzenidis | Greece | 19.20 | | | 19.20 | Q |
| 3 | B | Alperen Karahan | Turkey | 19.05 | | | 19.05 | Q |
| 4 | A | Valentin Moll | Germany | 18.98 | x | – | 18.98 | q |
| 5 | A | Riccardo Ferrara | Italy | 18.17 | 18.97 | – | 18.97 | q |
| 6 | A | Arttu Korkeasalo | Finland | 17.88 | 18.89 | 18.31 | 18.89 | q |
| 7 | B | Eric Maihöfer | Germany | 18.61 | x | x | 18.61 | q |
| 8 | B | Aleh Tamashevich | Belarus | 18.54 | 18.59 | 18.30 | 18.59 | q |
| 9 | B | Piotr Goździewicz | Poland | 18.33 | 18.15 | 18.36 | 18.36 | q |
| 10 | B | Aliaksei Aleksandrovich | Belarus | x | 17.79 | 18.15 | 18.15 | q |
| 11 | B | Bogdan Zdravković | Serbia | 18.12 | 17.91 | x | 18.12 | q |
| 12 | A | David Tupý | Czech Republic | x | 16.87 | 18.11 | 18.11 | q |
| 13 | B | Tadeáš Procházka | Czech Republic | 17.52 | x | 18.06 | 18.06 | |
| 14 | B | Eero Ahola | Finland | 17.25 | 17.63 | 17.96 | 17.96 | |
| 15 | B | Balázs Tóth | Hungary | 17.50 | 17.94 | 17.72 | 17.94 | |
| 16 | A | Fred Moudani-Likibi | France | 16.86 | 17.89 | x | 17.89 | |
| 17 | A | Artem Levchenko | Ukraine | 17.88 | 17.81 | x | 17.88 | |
| 18 | B | Mattijs Mols | Netherlands | 17.65 | x | x | 17.65 | |
| 19 | A | Miguel Gómez | Spain | 16.77 | 17.52 | x | 17.52 | |
| 20 | A | László Kovács | Hungary | x | 17.44 | 17.21 | 17.44 | |
| 21 | B | Adrián Baran | Slovakia | 16.58 | x | 17.16 | 17.16 | |
| 22 | B | Francesco Trabacca | Italy | x | 17.06 | x | 17.06 | |
| 23 | A | Risto Drobnjak | Montenegro | 16.29 | 17.04 | 17.02 | 17.04 | |
| 24 | A | Jakub Héža | Czech Republic | 16.85 | x | 16.98 | 16.98 | |
| 25 | A | Fatih Alpaslan | Turkey | x | 16.90 | x | 16.90 | |
| 26 | B | Iason Machairas | Greece | 16.60 | x | 16.82 | 16.82 | |
| 27 | A | Dino Tumbul | Serbia | x | 16.65 | 16.68 | 16.68 | |
| 28 | B | Nermin Štitkovac | Bosnia and Herzegovina | 16.57 | 16.59 | x | 16.59 | |

=== Final ===
| Rank | Name | Nationality | #1 | #2 | #3 | #4 | #5 | #6 | Result | Notes |
|---|---|---|---|---|---|---|---|---|---|---|
| 1st place, gold medalist(s) | Dzmitry Karpuk | Belarus | 20.33 | 20.26 | 19.90 | 20.26 | 19.50 | 20.16 | 20.33 | |
| 2nd place, silver medalist(s) | Alperen Karahan | Turkey | 19.15 | 19.19 | 19.75 | x | x | 19.34 | 19.75 | |
| 3rd place, bronze medalist(s) | Odysseas Mouzenidis | Greece | 17.63 | 18.72 | x | 19.19 | x | 19.41 | 19.41 | |
| 4 | Aleh Tamashevich | Belarus | 18.12 | 18.90 | 18.75 | 18.74 | 19.29 | 19.21 | 19.29 | |
| 5 | Eric Maihöfer | Germany | 18.29 | 18.61 | 18.44 | 18.96 | 19.05 | 19.27 | 19.27 | |
| 6 | Riccardo Ferrara | Italy | 18.49 | x | x | 18.93 | 18.35 | 18.97 | 18.97 | |
| 7 | Arttu Korkeasalo | Finland | 18.29 | 18.21 | x | 18.93 | x | x | 18.93 | =PB |
| 8 | Piotr Goździewicz | Poland | x | 18.32 | x | x | x | x | 18.32 | |
| 9 | Valentin Moll | Germany | x | 18.17 | 15.57 | | | | 18.17 | |
| 10 | Bogdan Zdravković | Serbia | 17.82 | 17.98 | x | | | | 17.98 | |
| 11 | David Tupý | Czech Republic | 16.62 | 17.26 | x | | | | 17.26 | |
| | Aliaksei Aleksandrovich | Belarus | x | x | x | | | | NM | |
