= 2025 World Athletics Indoor Championships – Men's shot put =

Men's shot put at the 2025 World Athletics Indoor Championships
- Venue: Nanjing's Cube at Nanjing Youth Olympic Sports Park
- Location: Nanjing, China
- Dates: 23 March
- Competitors: 15 from 12 nations
- Winning distance: 21.65 m

Medalists
gold medal	Tom Walsh	New Zealand
silver medal	Roger Steen	United States
bronze medal	Adrian Piperi	United States

The men's shot put at the 2025 World Athletics Indoor Championships took place on the short track of the Nanjing's Cube at Nanjing Youth Olympic Sports Park in Nanjing, China, on 23 March 2025. This was the 21st time the event was contested at the World Athletics Indoor Championships. Athletes could qualify by achieving the entry standard or by their World Athletics Ranking in the event.

The final took place on 23 March during the evening session.

== Background ==
The men's shot put was contested 20 times before 2025, at every previous edition of the World Athletics Indoor Championships.

Records before the 2025 World Athletics Indoor Championships
Record	Athlete (nation)	Height (m)	Location	Date
World record	Ryan Crouser (USA)	23.56	Los Angeles, United States	27 May 2023
Championship record	Ryan Crouser (USA)	22.77	Glasgow, United Kingdom	1 March 2024
World leading	Leonardo Fabbri (ITA)	21.95	Liévin, France	13 February 2025

== Qualification ==
For the men's shot put, the qualification period ran from 1 September 2024 until 9 March 2025. Athletes could qualify by achieving the entry standards of 22.00 m. Athletes could also qualify by virtue of their World Athletics Ranking for the event or by virtue of their World Athletics Indoor Tour wildcard. There was a target number of 16 athletes.

== Final ==
The final was held on 23 March, starting at 19:38 (UTC+8).

Results of the final
Place	Athlete	Nation	Round						Result	Notes
Place	Athlete	Nation	#1	#2	#3	#4	#5	#6	Result	Notes
1st place, gold medalist(s)	Tom Walsh	New Zealand	21.65	x	21.11	20.95	21.19	21.48	21.65 m	SB
2nd place, silver medalist(s)	Roger Steen	United States	20.47	20.80	20.88	x	x	21.62	21.62 m	SB
3rd place, bronze medalist(s)	Adrian Piperi	United States	x	21.21	20.88	21.48	20.95	21.08	21.48 m	
4	Leonardo Fabbri	Italy	20.67	20.69	x	20.81	21.36	21.15	21.36 m	
5	Chukwuebuka Enekwechi	Nigeria	20.52	x	21.25	21.10	x	x	21.25 m	SB
6	Wictor Petersson	Sweden	20.03	20.73	20.24	x	x	20.87	20.87 m	
7	Andrei Toader	Romania	x	20.64	x	20.39	20.63		20.64 m	
8	Zane Weir	Italy	20.63	x	x	20.55	x		20.63 m	
9	Rajindra Campbell	Jamaica	19.18	19.74	20.45	x			20.45 m	SB
10	Willian Dourado	Brazil	19.85	x	20.24	x			20.24 m	
11	Welington Morais	Brazil	19.85	20.13	19.96				20.13 m	
12	Scott Lincoln	Great Britain	19.88	x	x				19.88 m	
13	Xing Jialiang	China	18.90	19.24	19.76				19.76 m	
14	Chris van Niekerk	South Africa	19.39	19.47	x				19.47 m	
—	Konrad Bukowiecki	Poland	x	x	x				NM	
