= 2017 European Athletics U23 Championships – Men's shot put =

The men's shot put event at the 2017 European Athletics U23 Championships was held in Bydgoszcz, Poland, at Zdzisław Krzyszkowiak Stadium on 13 and 14 July.

== Medalists ==
Gold	Konrad Bukowiecki; Poland
Silver	Denzel Comenentia; Netherlands
Bronze	Sebastiano Bianchetti; Italy

== Results ==
=== Qualification ===
13 July

Qualification rule: 18.40 (Q) or the 12 best results (q) qualified for the final.

Rank	Group	Name	Nationality	#1	#2	#3	Results	Notes
1	A	Konrad Bukowiecki	Poland	21.26			21.26	Q, CR
2	A	Simon Bayer	Germany	18.29	19.06		19.06	Q
3	B	Leonardo Fabbri	Italy	19.06			19.06	Q
4	B	Patrick Müller	Germany	18.85			18.85	Q
5	A	Denzel Comenentia	Netherlands	18.72			18.72	Q
6	A	Osman Can Özdeveci	Turkey	18.53			18.53	Q
7	A	Sebastiano Bianchetti	Italy	18.49			18.49	Q
8	A	Gian Piero Ragonesi	Italy	x	17.92	18.44	18.44	Q
9	A	Blaž Zupančič	Slovenia	18.38	x	x	18.38	q
10	A	Kiriakos Zotos	Greece	18.23	17.56	x	18.23	q
11	B	Jan Parol	Poland	17.15	18.13	17.11	18.13	q
12	B	Nace Pleško	Slovenia	17.97	x	17.90	17.97	q
13	B	Panu Tirkkonen	Finland	17.66	x	x	17.66	
14	B	Viktor Gardenkrans	Sweden	17.62	x	x	17.62	
15	B	Kristoffer Thomsen	Denmark	17.21	x	17.58	17.58	
16	A	Antonio Santana	Spain	17.56	17.21	x	17.56	
17	B	Frantsi Latifllari	Greece	17.52	x	17.49	17.52	
18	A	Roman Kokoshko	Ukraine	16.98	x	17.35	17.35	
19	B	Valentin Döbler	Germany	16.79	x	17.23	17.23	
20	A	Julius Malotkinas	Lithuania	x	17.05	x	17.05	
21	B	Daniel Pardo	Spain	16.50	16.73	x	16.73	
22	A	Aleksandar Novaković	Bosnia and Herzegovina	16.09	x	16.73	16.73	
23	B	Karolis Čekanavičius	Lithuania	15.86	16.37	16.70	16.70	
24	B	Matija Carek	Croatia	x	16.70	x	16.70	
25	B	Marius Constan Musteata	Romania	x	16.24	x	16.24	
26	A	John Kelly	Ireland	x	x	16.10	16.10	
27	A	Jander Heil	Estonia	x	16.01	x	16.01	

=== Final ===
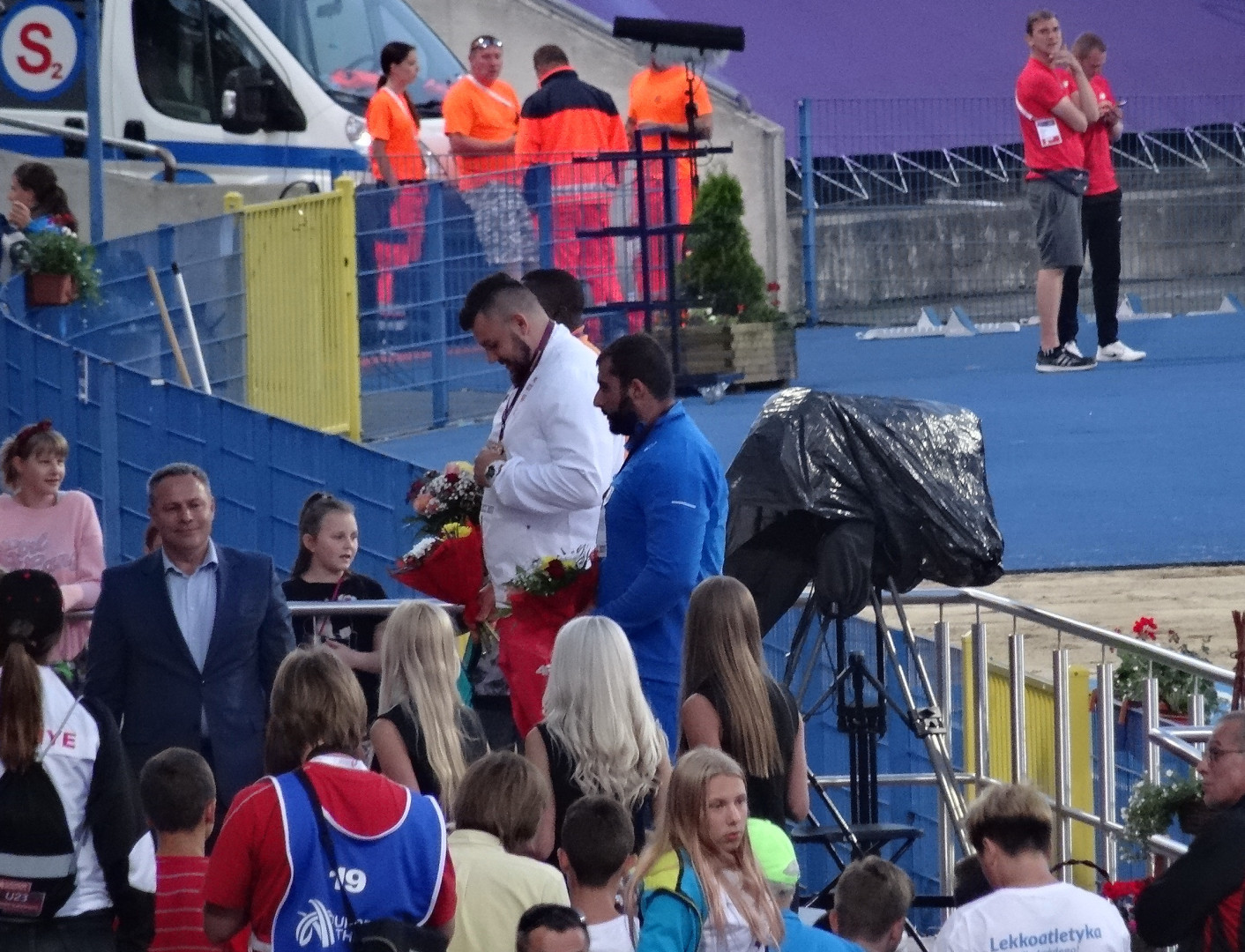
The medal ceremony

14 July

Rank	Name	Nationality	Attempts						Result	Notes
Rank	Name	Nationality	1	2	3	4	5	6	Result	Notes
1st place, gold medalist(s)	Konrad Bukowiecki	Poland	21.44	x	20.75	x	x	21.59	21.59	CR, EL
2nd place, silver medalist(s)	Denzel Comenentia	Netherlands	19.20	18.89	19.39	19.35	19.86	19.78	19.86	
3rd place, bronze medalist(s)	Sebastiano Bianchetti	Italy	19.07	19.59	19.64	19.18	19.69	x	19.69	
4	Osman Can Özdeveci	Turkey	19.00	x	18.99	x	19.37	19.63	19.63	
5	Simon Bayer	Germany	18.48	18.81	18.99	x	x	19.30	19.30	PB
6	Patrick Müller	Germany	18.69	x	19.06	x	x	19.23	19.23	SB
7	Leonardo Fabbri	Italy	19.12	x	x	18.59	x	x	19.12	
8	Jan Parol	Poland	17.95	x	18.60	x	18.51	x	18.60	
9	Nace Pleško	Slovenia	18.55	x	x				18.55	SB
10	Kiriakos Zotos	Greece	x	18.35	x				18.35	
11	Blaž Zupančič	Slovenia	18.33	17.94	17.90				18.33	
12	Gian Piero Ragonesi	Italy	17.93	x	18.28				18.28	
