= Armin Sinančević =

Serbian shot putter (born 1996)

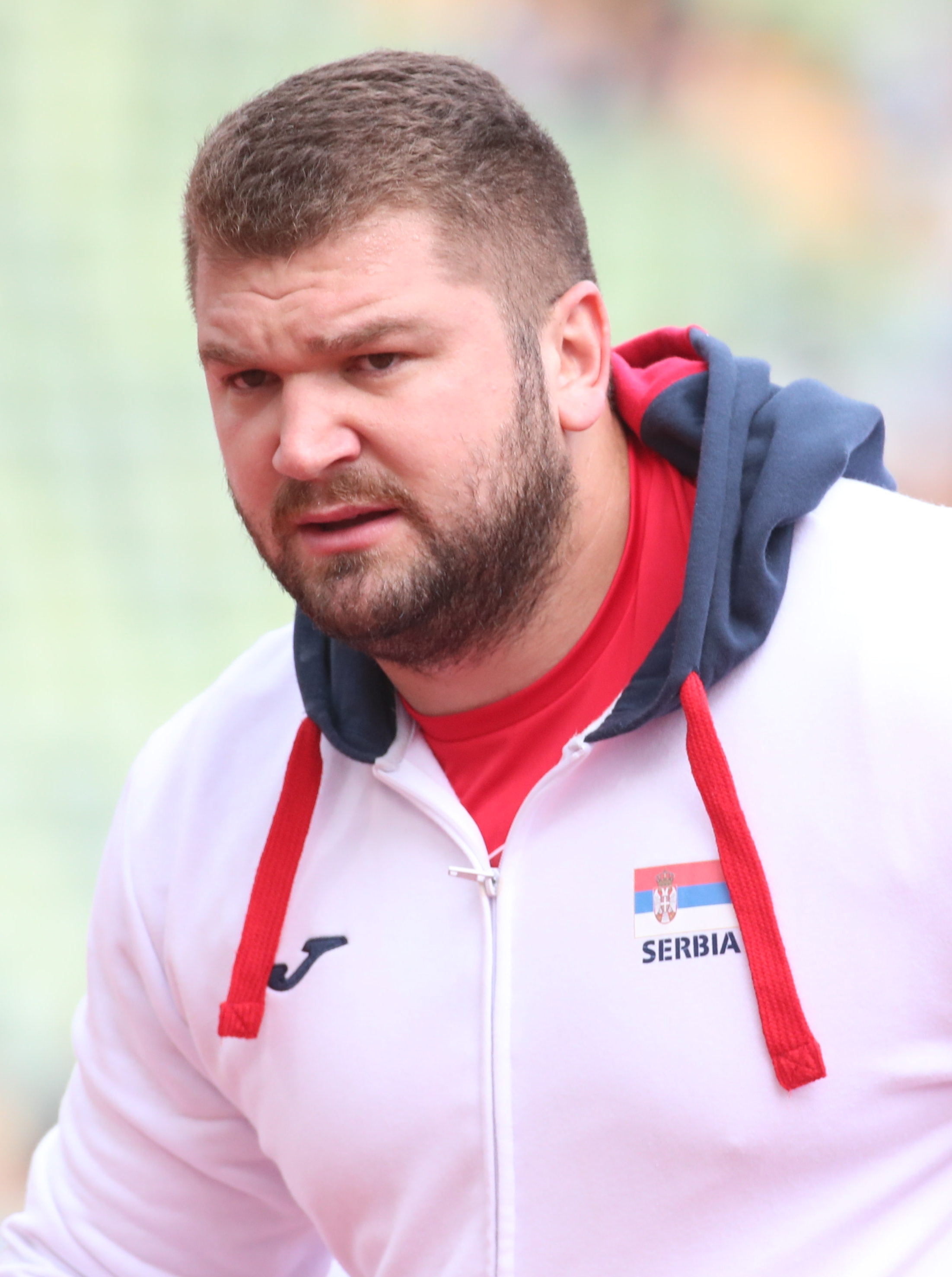

Personal information
- Born: 14 August 1996 (age 30) Prijepolje, Serbia, FR Yugoslavia
- Height: 1.92 m (6 ft 4 in)
- Weight: 145 kg (320 lb)

Sport
- Country: Serbia
- Sport: Track and field
- Event: Shot put
- Coached by: Dragan Perić

Achievements and titles
- Personal bests: Shot put (outdoor): 21.88 m (2021, 2x) (NR); Shot put (indoor): 21.25 m (2021) (NR)
Medal record
Men's athletics
Representing Serbia
European Championships
Silver medal – second place	2022 Munich	Shot put
Diamond League
Third place	2021	Shot put
Mediterranean Games
Gold medal – first place	2022 Oran	Shot put

Armin Sinančević (Serbian Cyrillic: Армин Синанчевић; born 14 August 1996 in Prijepolje, Serbia) is a Serbian shot putter.

== Career ==
=== 2019 ===
Sinančević competed in the men's shot put event at the World Athletics Championships held in Doha, Qatar. He progressed to the final with then-personal best of 21.51 m, but failed to record a mark in the final.

=== 2021 ===
Sinančević finished in 6th place in the men's shot put event at the European Athletics Indoor Championships held in Toruń, Poland.

In a Diamond League meeting in Doha in late May, he tied his own recently set national record of 21.88 m. It was the longest shot in the event, but he finished in third place under new "Final Three" format, where the three leading competitors through five rounds qualify for the sixth round, which is then solely used to determine the final ranking of the top three. Sinančević threw over 22 m in the final round, but his shot was ruled invalid.

In June, he finished second in a Diamond League Meet in Florence with a throw of 20.93 m in the decisive last-round, while his best shot of 21.60 m which was achieved in the fourth round was also second-best in the event.

Sinančević represented Serbia at the 2020 Summer Olympics in Tokyo, Japan. He finished the competition in 7th place in shot put final, where American Ryan Crouser broke olympic record three times.

In September, with old rules back in place, Sinančević took third place in Diamond League Final in Zurich with a shot of 21.86 m in the fifth round to finish ahead of Tom Walsh.

=== 2022 ===
Sinančević won the men's shot put event at the 2022 Mediterranean Games, setting new Games record with 21.29 m. He finished second at the European Athletics Championships in Munich with a throw of 21.39m.

== International competitions ==
Year	Competition	Venue	Position	Notes
2016	Balkan Championships	Pitești, Romania	13th	16.75 m
2018	Balkan Championships	Stara Zagora, Bulgaria	6th	18.49 m
2019	Balkan Indoor Championships	Istanbul, Turkey	10th	17.61 m
2019	Balkan Championships	Pravets, Bulgaria	2nd	20.58 m
2019	World Championships	Doha, Qatar	–	NM
2020	Balkan Indoor Championships	Istanbul, Turkey	3rd	19.77 m
2021	Balkan Indoor Championships	Istanbul, Turkey	1st	20.63 m
2021	European Indoor Championships	Toruń, Poland	6th	20.74 m
2021	Balkan Championships	Smederevo, Serbia	1st	21.50 m CR
2021	Olympic Games	Tokyo, Japan	7th	20.89 m
2022	Mediterranean Games	Oran, Algeria	1st	21.29 m GR
2022	European Championships	Munich, Germany	2nd	21.39 m
2023	European Indoor Championships	Istanbul, Turkey	–	NM
2023	World Championships	Budapest, Hungary	9th	20.78 m
2024	European Championships	Rome, Italy	–	NM
2024	Olympic Games	Paris, France	24th (q)	19.31 m
2025	European Indoor Championships	Apeldoorn, Netherlands	5th	20.49 m
2025	World Championships	Tokyo, Japan	16th (q)	20.18 m
2026	European Championships	Birmingham, United Kingdom	8th	20.02 m
2026	Mediterranean Games	Taranto, Italy	5th	19.83 m

== Personal bests ==
Outdoor

- Shot put – 21.88 m (Bar 2021, Doha 2021) NR

Indoor

- Shot put – 21.25 m (Belgrade 2021) NR

== See also ==
- List of Serbian records in athletics
