= Willian Dourado =

Brazilian shot putter (born 1994)

Personal information
- Full name: Willian Denilson Venâncio Dourado
- Born: 6 January 1994 (age 32) Penápolis, Brzil

Sport
- Sport: Track and field
- Event: Shot put

Willian Denilson Venâncio Dourado (born 6 January 1994) is a Brazilian shot putter. He represented his country at the 2022 World Championships without qualifying for the final.

In August 2025, he became the 2nd best shot putter in Brazilian history (behind only Darlan Romani) by achieving a throw of 21.41m at the Brazil Trophy.

== International competitions ==
Year	Competition	Venue	Position	Event	Notes
Representing Brazil
2013	South American Junior Championships	Resistencia, Argentina	2nd	Shot put (6 kg)	18.39 m
2014	South American U23 Championships	Montevideo, Uruguay	2nd	Shot put	17.61 m
2016	Ibero-American Championships	Rio de Janeiro, Brazil	3rd	Shot put	18.96 m
2016	South American U23 Championships	Lima, Peru	1st	Shot put	18.99 m
2017	South American Championships	Asunción, Paraguay	2nd	Shot put	19.95 m
2017	Universiade	Taipei, Taiwan	7th	Shot put	19.25 m
2019	South American Championships	Lima, Peru	2nd	Shot put	19.09 m
2020	South American Indoor Championships	Cochabamba, Bolivia	1st	Shot put	19.09 m
2022	South American Indoor Championships	Cochabamba, Bolivia	2nd	Shot put	19.83 m
2022	World Championships	Eugene, United States	21st (q)	Shot put	19.73 m
2022	South American Games	Asunción, Paraguay	2nd	Shot put	19.77 m
2023	South American Championships	São Paulo, Brazil	3rd	Shot put	19.45 m
2025	South American Indoor Championships	Cochabamba, Bolivia	2nd	Shot put	20.60 m
2025	World Indoor Championships	Nanjing, China	10th	Shot put	20.24 m
2025	South American Championships	Mar del Plata, Argentina	1st	Shot put	20.65 m
2025	World Championships	Tokyo, Japan	21st (q)	Shot put	19.78 m
2026	South American Indoor Championships	Cochabamba, Bolivia	2nd	Shot put	20.25 m
2026	Ibero-American Championships	Lima, Peru	1st	Shot put	20.07 m
2026	Pan American Championships	Medellín, Colombia	1st	Shot put	20.53 m
2026	South American Games	Santa Fe, Argentina	1st	Shot put	20.27 m

== Personal bests ==
Outdoor

- Shot put – 21.41 (São Paulo 2025)
- Discus throw – 52.78 (Votuporanga 2018)

Indoor

- Shot put – 20.60 (Cochabamba 2025)
