= Konrad Bukowiecki =

Polish athlete (born 1997)

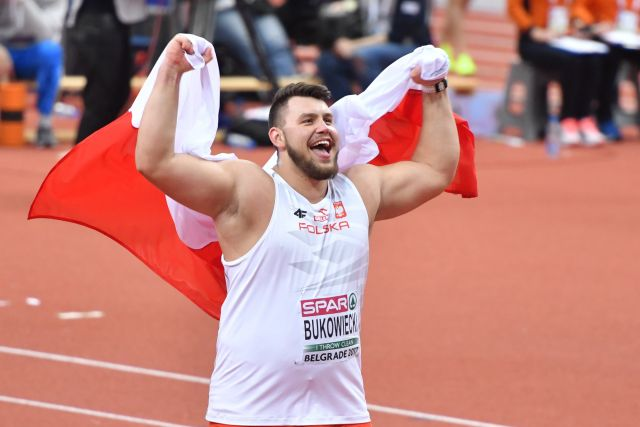
- Bukowiecki in 2017

Personal information
- Born: March 17, 1997 (age 29) Szczytno, Warmian-Masurian Voivodeship, Poland
- Education: Police Academy in Szczytno
- Height: 1.91 m (6 ft 3 in)
- Weight: 140 kg (309 lb)

Sport
- Country: Poland
- Sport: Athletics
- Event: Shot Put
- Club: PKS Gwardia Szczytno Playas de Castellón (esp)
- Coached by: Ireneusz Bukowiecki

Achievements and titles
- Personal bests: Outdoor: 22.25 m (2019); Indoor: 22.00 m (2018)
Medal record
Athletics
Representing Poland
European Championships
Silver medal – second place	2018 Berlin	Shot put
European Indoor Championships
Gold medal – first place	2017 Belgrade	Shot put
World Junior Championships
Gold medal – first place	2014 Oregon	Shot put
European U23 Championships
Gold medal – first place	2017 Bydgoszcz	Shot put
Gold medal – first place	2019 Naples	Shot put
European Junior Championships
Gold medal – first place	2015 Eskilstuna	Shot put
Youth Olympic Games
Gold medal – first place	2014 Nanjing	Shot put
European Youth Olympic Festival
Gold medal – first place	2013 Utrecht	Shot put
Silver medal – second place	2013 Utrecht	Discus throw
Summer World University Games
Gold medal – first place	2019 Naples	Shot put
Gold medal – first place	2021 Chengdu	Shot put
Silver medal – second place	2017 Taipei	Shot Put
Military World Games
Silver medal – second place	2019 Wuhan	Shot Put

Konrad Bukowiecki (Polish pronunciation: [ˈkɔnrad bukɔˈvjɛt͡skʲi]; born 17 March 1997) is a Polish athlete competing primarily in the shot put. He won the silver medal at the 2018 European Championships, gold medals at the 2017 and 2019 European Under-23 Championships, and gold at the 2017 European Indoor Championships.

In 2014 at age 17, Bukowiecki was the World junior champion and, the following year, European junior champion; he was voted European Athletics Male Rising Star of the Year that season. He is the Polish indoor record holder and a four-time national champion.

== Career ==
Bukowiecki is coached by his father. He won the gold medal at the 2014 World Junior Championships and at the 2014 Summer Youth Olympics. In addition, he currently holds the junior indoor world record with the 6 kg implement, as well as world youth indoor bests with the 6 kg and 5 kg implements.

In his debut at the senior level competition, he finished sixth at the 2015 European Indoor Championships with the European absolute best with the 7.26 kg shot. Later that season he added the European Junior title to his accolades and competed at the 2015 World Championships where he, however, failed to record a valid mark.

During the 2016 indoor season Bukowiecki further bettered his European junior best with the senior implement to 20.61 metres. He later finished fourth at the 2016 World Indoor Championships in Portland. He initially won at the 2016 World Junior Championships in Athletics, but was disqualified for an anti-doping offense. It was later proved he took the substance (higenamine) unknowingly in the form of a diet supplement with a "doping free" inscription on the label and the IAAF only punished him with a "public reprimand".

At the 2016 Olympic Games in Rio de Janeiro, Bukowiecki fouled out in the first three rounds of the final, failing to move into the final three rounds.

In 2019, he set his personal best result by beating the 22 meters barrier and achieving 22.25 m during the Kamila Skolimowska Memorial held at the Silesian Stadium in Chorzów.

== Personal life ==
Konrad Bukowiecki was born in Szczytno. His father, Ireneusz Bukowiecki, is a former decathlete. On 28 September 2024, Bukowiecki married Polish sprinter Natalia Kaczmarek with whom he had been in a relationship since 2018.

== Achievements ==
=== International competitions ===
Representing Poland
Year	Competition	Venue	Position	Event	Notes
2013	World Youth Championships	Donetsk, Ukraine	5th	Shot put (5 kg)	20.10 m
2013	European Youth Olympic Festival	Utrecht, Netherlands	1st	Shot put (5 kg)	21.41 m
2013	European Youth Olympic Festival	Utrecht, Netherlands	2nd	Discus throw (1.5 kg)	58.35 m
2014	World Junior Championships	Eugene, United States	1st	Shot put (6 kg)	22.06 m
2014	World Junior Championships	Eugene, United States	25th (q)	Discus throw (1.75 kg)	52.92 m
2014	Youth Olympic Games	Nanjing, China	1st	Shot put (5 kg)	23.17 m
2015	European Indoor Championships	Prague, Czech Republic	6th	Shot put	20.46 m
2015	European Junior Championships	Eskilstuna, Sweden	1st	Shot put (6 kg)	22.62 m
2015	European Junior Championships	Eskilstuna, Sweden	13th (q)	Discus throw (1.75 kg)	54.43 m
2015	World Championships	Beijing, China	—	Shot put	NM
2016	World Indoor Championships	Portland, United States	4th	Shot put	20.53 m
2016	European Championships	Amsterdam, Netherlands	4th	Shot put	20.58 m
2016	World U20 Championships	Bydgoszcz, Poland	DQ	Shot put (6 kg)	DQ (Doping)
2016	World U20 Championships	Bydgoszcz, Poland	DQ	Discus throw (1.75 kg)	DQ
2016	Olympic Games	Rio de Janeiro, Brazil	6th (q)	Shot put	20.71 m^{1}
2017	European Indoor Championships	Belgrade, Serbia	1st	Shot put	21.97 m WL PB
2017	European U23 Championships	Bydgoszcz, Poland	1st	Shot put	21.59 m CR
2017	World Championships	London, United Kingdom	8th	Shot put	20.89 m
2017	Universiade	Taipei, Taiwan	2nd	Shot put	20.16 m
2018	World Indoor Championships	Birmingham, United Kingdom	8th	Shot put	20.99 m
2018	European Championships	Berlin, Germany	2nd	Shot put	21.66 m
2019	European Indoor Championships	Glasgow, United Kingdom	11th (q)	Shot put	20.18 m
2019	Universiade	Naples, Italy	1st	Shot put	21.54 m
2019	European U23 Championships	Gävle, Sweden	1st	Shot put	21.51 m
2019	World Championships	Doha, Qatar	6th	Shot put	21.46 m
2019	Military World Games	Wuhan, China	2nd	Shot put	21.84 m
2021	Olympic Games	Tokyo, Japan	23rd (q)	Shot put	20.01 m
2022	World Indoor Championships	Belgrade, Serbia	10th	Shot put	20.79 m
2022	World Championships	Eugene, United States	13th (q)	Shot put	20.24 m
2022	European Championships	Munich, Germany	6th	Shot put	20.74 m
2023	World University Games	Chengdu, China	1st	Shot put	20.23 m
2023	World Championships	Budapest, Hungary	28th (q)	Shot put	19.21 m
2024	European Championships	Rome, Italy	17th (q)	Shot put	19.20 m
2024	Olympic Games	Paris, France	28th (q)	Shot put	18.83 m
2025	European Indoor Championships	Apeldoorn, Netherlands	10th (q)	Shot put	19.78 m
2025	World Indoor Championships	Nanjing, China	—	Shot put	NM
2025	World Championships	Tokyo, Japan	9th	Shot put	20.66 m
2026	World Indoor Championships	Toruń, Poland	8th	Shot put	20.62 m
2026	European Championships	Birmingham, United Kingdom	7th	Shot put	20.38 m

^{1}No mark in the final

=== National titles ===
- Polish Athletics Championships: 2016, 2019
- Polish Indoor Athletics Championships: 2017, 2022

=== Personal bests ===
- Shot put – 22.25 (Chorzów 2019)
  - Shot put indoor – 22.00 (Toruń 2018) NR
- Shot put (6 kg) – 22.94 (Bojanowo 2016)
  - Shot put (6 kg) indoor – 22.96 (Spała 2016) NU20R
- Shot put (5 kg) – 23.17 (Nanjing 2014)
  - Shot put (5 kg) indoor – 24.24 (Spała 2014) NU18R
- Discus throw – 58.42 (Suwałki 2017)
- Discus throw (1.75 kg) – 62.20 (Białystok 2016)
- Discus throw (1.5 kg) – 66.52 (Warsaw 2014) NU18R

Awards and achievements
Preceded by (United Kingdom) Adam Gemili	Men's European Athletics Rising Star of the Year; 2015	Succeeded by (Germany) Max Heß
