= Marcus Thomsen =

Norwegian shot putter (born 1998)

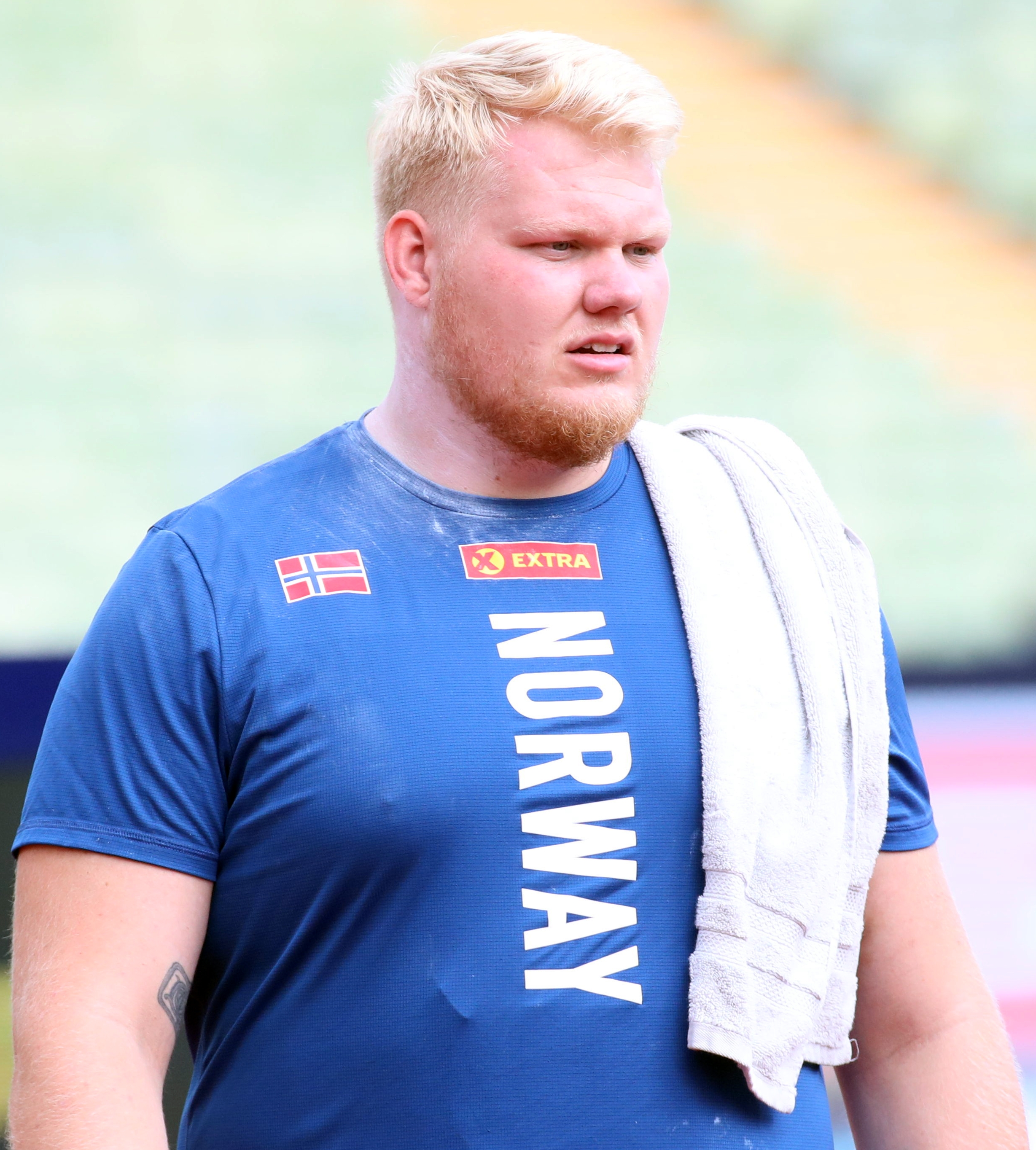
- Thomsen at the 2022 European Championships

Personal information
- Born: 7 January 1998 (age 28) Voss Municipality, Norway
- Height: 1.86 m (6 ft 1 in)

Sport
- Sport: Athletics
- Event: Shot put
- Club: IK Tjalve
- Coached by: Simon Stewart, Vesteinn Hafsteinsson

Marcus Thomsen (born 7 January 1998 in Voss Municipality) is a Norwegian athlete specialising in the shot put. He won a gold medal at the 2017 European U20 Championships. He also reached the final at the European Indoor Championships finishing seventh.

His family moved from Voss to Aarhus, Denmark in 2012, and Thomsen spent his teenage years there. When breaking through as a youth athlete he did not represent any Norwegian club, eventually being recruited by Oslo-based club IK Tjalve.

His personal bests in the event are 21.23 metres outdoors, achieved in June 2025 at Bottnaryd, Sweden and 21.09 metres indoors, achieved in February 2021 at Växjö, Sweden, both which also are the national records.

He placed tenth in shot put at the 2025 World Athletics Championships.

== International competitions ==
Year	Competition	Venue	Position	Event	Notes
Representing Norway
2015	World Youth Championships	Cali, Colombia	11th	Shot put (5 kg)	19.16 m
2016	World U20 Championships	Bydgoszcz, Poland	7th	Shot put (6 kg)	19.39 m
2017	European Throwing Cup (U23)	Las Palmas, Spain	3rd	Shot put	18.20 m
2017	European U20 Championships	Grosseto, Italy	1st	Shot put (6 kg)	21.36 m
2018	European Throwing Cup (U23)	Leiria, Portugal	1st	Shot put	19.61 m
2018	European Championships	Berlin, Germany	16th (q)	Shot put	19.59 m
2019	European Indoor Championships	Glasgow, United Kingdom	7th	Shot put	20.22 m
2019	European U23 Championships	Gävle, Sweden	4th	Shot put	19.41 m
2021	European Indoor Championships	Toruń, Poland	7th	Shot put	20.28 m
2022	World Championships	Eugene, United States	10th	Shot put	20.66 m
2022	European Championships	Munich, Germany	9th	Shot put	19.91 m
2023	European Indoor Championships	Istanbul, Turkey	6th	Shot put	20.66 m
2023	World Championships	Budapest, Hungary	21st (q)	Shot put	19.97 m
2024	European Championships	Rome, Italy	8th	Shot put	20.42 m
2024	Olympic Games	Paris, France	9th	Shot put	20.67 m
2025	World Championships	Tokyo, Japan	10th	Shot put	20.53 m
2026	World Indoor Championships	Toruń, Poland	14th	Shot put	19.41 m
