= Joe Kovacs =

American track and field athlete (1989)

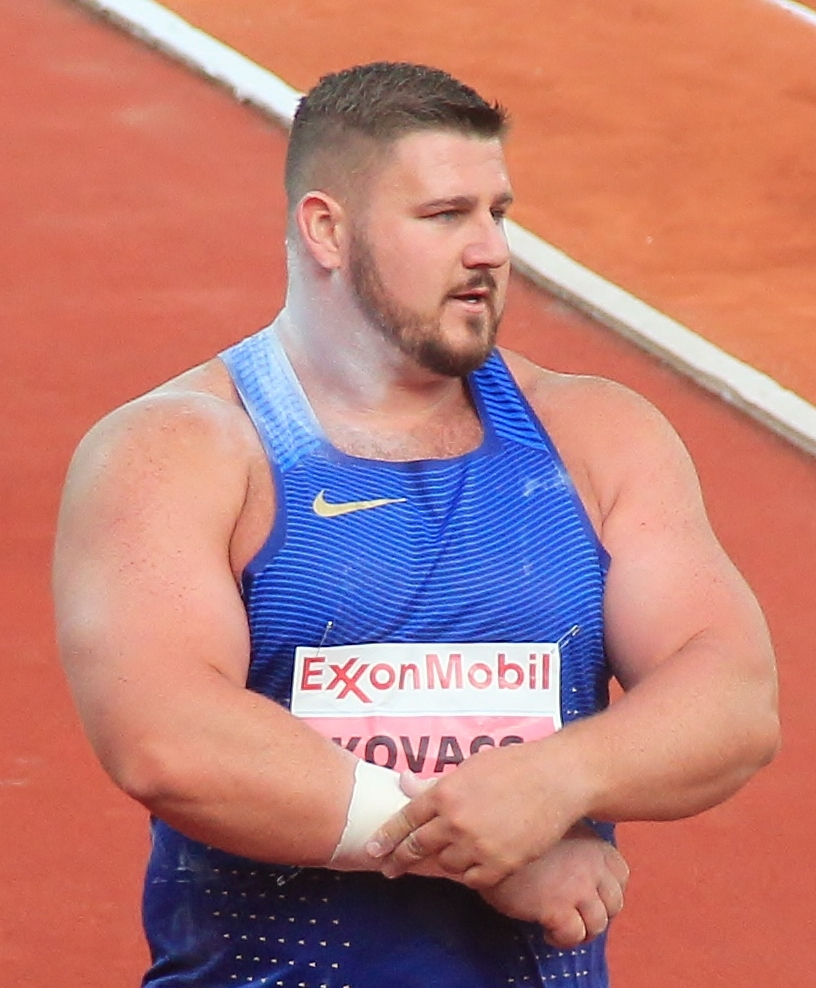
- Kovacs in June 2016

Personal information
- Full name: Joseph Mathias Kovacs
- Born: June 28, 1989 (age 37) Nazareth, Pennsylvania, U.S.
- Height: 6 ft 0 in (183 cm)
- Weight: 295 lb (134 kg)

Sport
- Country: United States
- Sport: Track and field
- Event: Shot put
- College team: Penn State (2008–2012)
- Coached by: Ashley Kovacs

Achievements and titles
- Personal bests: Shot put: Outdoor 23.23 m (76 ft 2 1/2 in) (Zürich 2022); Indoor 22.05 m (72 ft 4 in) (Geneva 2021)
Medal record
Men's athletics
Representing the United States
Olympic Games
Silver medal – second place	2016 Rio de Janeiro	Shot put
Silver medal – second place	2020 Tokyo	Shot put
Silver medal – second place	2024 Paris	Shot put
World Championships
Gold medal – first place	2015 Beijing	Shot put
Gold medal – first place	2019 Doha	Shot put
Silver medal – second place	2017 London	Shot put
Silver medal – second place	2022 Eugene	Shot put
Bronze medal – third place	2023 Budapest	Shot put
Diamond League
First place	2022	Shot put
First place	2023	Shot put
First place	2025	Shot put

Joseph Mathias Kovacs (/ˈkoʊvæks/ KOH-vaks; born June 28, 1989) is an American track and field athlete who competes in the shot put and has a personal record of 23.23 meters outdoors and 22.05 meters indoors. He won gold medals at the 2015 and 2019 World Championships. He won silver medals at the 2017 World Championships, 2016, 2020, and 2024 Summer Olympics. His personal best of 23.23 metres makes him the second best competitor all-time in the shot put event.

== Early life and education ==
Kovacs was born in Nazareth, Pennsylvania, on June 28, 1989. He excelled at Bethlehem Catholic High School in track and field, winning PIAA titles in discus and shot put during his senior season. The winning shot put mark of 64 ft 10.75 in (19.7803 m) is the PIAA Class AA state record.

Kovacs attended Pennsylvania State University, where he earned his undergraduate degree in Earth and Mineral Science. He completed graduate classes in Counselor Education while participating on the Nittany Lions' track and field team.

== Track and field career ==
In his first year as a professional, Kovacs was sponsored by Nike, Inc. He missed the podium with a 4th-place finish in the United States Olympic Trials with a best throw of 21.08m/69-2, placed 4th at the NCAA Division I outdoor championships with a best throw of 19.58 m (65–1.5 feet), but won the shot put at the Big Ten Conference outdoor championships with a best throw of 20.85 m (68–5 feet). He enjoyed a success filled summer on the European track circuit with 2nd in Paris (20.44 meters, 67–0.75 feet); 2nd in Madrid (19.56 meters, 64–2.25 feet) and 6th in London (19.61 meters, 64–4 feet).

Kovacs, in his second year as a professional, threw a season best of 20.82 meters (68–3.75 feet) at Tucson Elite Meet on May 18, 2013, which ranked him 6th in the US.

Kovacs won the New Balance Indoor Grand Prix with his first 70-foot throw. He then placed 3rd at the USA Indoor Track and Field Championships with a throw of 70 ft 5.5 in (21.476 m). On June 25, 2014, Joe Kovacs won the 2014 USA Outdoor Track and Field Championships at a special venue in front of the California State Capitol, with a personal best of 22.03 m (72 ft 3 in), the top throw in the world for 2014.

As a guest competitor at the Rafer Johnson/Jackie Joyner Kersee Invitational at UCLA on April 11, 2015, Kovacs improved his personal best with a 22.35 m (73 ft 3 3/4 in) to again take the early season world lead, by almost a full meter at the time. It was the farthest throw in the world since 2010 and ranked him as the No. 12 performer of all time. He backed that up with his following throw over 21.70 m (71 ft 2 1/4 in). After winning his second National Championship in June, Kovacs improved again, adding another 21 cm to throw 22.56 m (74 ft 0 in) at the Herculis meet in Monaco. That throw moved him past four Americans to the number 8 performer in history and the best throw since 2003.

In July 2016, Kovacs qualified for his first Olympic team by finishing in second place at the Olympic Trials. He then won a silver medal at the 2016 Olympics with a throw of 21.78 meters (71 feet 5 inches). He finished behind teammate Ryan Crouser, who threw an Olympic Record 22.52 meters (73 feet 11 inches). On October 5, 2019, Kovacs won the gold medal at the Outdoor World Championships with a 22.91 meter Shot Put on his final throw of the event. He was coached by his wife and they are featured in an Olympic Channel feature commercial together.

Joe Kovacs placed 3rd at the 2023 World Athletics Championship in Budapest.

Kovacs won silver medal in the 2024 Olympic Games in Paris, behind teammate Ryan Crouser.

== Personal life ==
Kovacs is a Hungarian-American and a Catholic. He is married to former collegiate shot-putter and Vanderbilt throwing coach Ashley Kovacs (née Muffet). In 2019, Ashley began coaching Joe professionally.

== See also ==
- List of Pennsylvania State University Olympians
