= Leonardo Fabbri =

Italian shot putter (born 1997)

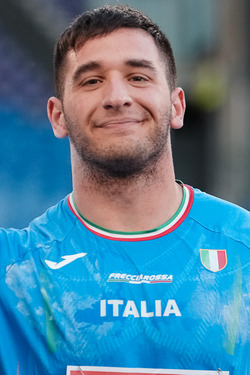
- Fabbri in 2024

Personal information
- National team: Italy: 14 caps (2018-2023)
- Born: 15 April 1997 (age 29) Bagno a Ripoli, Italy
- Height: 200 cm (6 ft 7 in)
- Weight: 130 kg (287 lb)

Sport
- Sport: Athletics
- Event: Shot put
- Club: Aeronautica Militare; Atletica Firenze Marathon
- Coached by: Paolo Dal Soglio

Achievements and titles
- Personal bests: Shot put (outdoor): 22.98 m (2024); Shot put (indoor): 21.60 m (2023)
Medal record
Men's athletics
Representing Italy
World Championships
| Silver medal – second place | 2023 Budapest | Shot put |
| Bronze medal – third place | 2025 Tokyo | Shot put |
World Indoor Championships
| Bronze medal – third place | 2024 Glasgow | Shot put |
Diamond League
| First place | 2024 Brussels | Shot put |
European Championships
| Gold medal – first place | 2024 Rome | Shot put |
| Gold medal – first place | 2026 Birmingham | Shot put |
European U23 Championships
| Silver medal – second place | 2019 Gävle | Shot put |
European Youth Olympic Festival
| Bronze medal – third place | 2013 Utrecht | Shot put |
Mediterranean U23 Championships
| Gold medal – first place | 2018 Jesolo | Shot put |

Leonardo Fabbri (born 15 April 1997) is an Italian shot putter. He has won two European Championships in 2024 and 2026. He competed at the 2020 and 2024 Olympics.

== Career ==
In winter 2019, at 22 years, his explosion, with 16th world best measure (his personal best 20.69 m) in the world top lists IAAF and the qualification at the 2019 European Athletics Indoor Championships.

On 14 September 2024, Fabbri won the shot put at the 2024 Diamond League final in Brussels, Belgium, with a meeting record of 22.98 metres.

== Statistics ==
=== National records ===
- Shot put (under-23): 20.99 m, Vicenza, Italy, 19 July 2019 – Current holder

=== Personal best ===
Outdoor

- Shot put: 22.98 m, Brussels, Belgium, 14 September 2024

Indoor

- Shot put: 21.96 m, Glasgow, United Kingdom, 1 March 2024

=== Progression ===
Personal Best

| Year (age) | Measure | Venue | Date | Note |
|---|---|---|---|---|
| 2026 (29) | 22.74 | Eugene, United States | 4 July | WL |
| 2025 (28) | 22.82 | Caorle, Italy | 3 August | |
| 2024 (27) | 22.98 | Brussels, Belgium | 14 September | NR |
| 2023 (26) | 22.34 | Budapest, Hungary | 19 August | |
| 2022 (25) | 21.16 | Padua, Italy | 4 September | |
| 2021 (24) | 21.71 | Florence, Italy | 10 June | |
| 2020 (23) | 21.99 | Padua, Italy | 30 August | |
| 2019 (22) | 20.99 | Vicenza, Italy | 19 July | |
| 2018 (21) | 20.07 | Leiria, Portugal | 14 July | |
| 2017 (20) | 19.33 | Trieste, Italy | 1 July | |

== Achievements ==
| Year | Competition | Venue | Position | Event | Measure | Notes |
|---|---|---|---|---|---|---|
| 2017 | European U23 Championships | Bydgoszcz, Poland | 7th | Shot put | 19.12 m | |
| 2018 | Mediterranean Athletics U23 Championships | Jesolo, Italy | 1st | Shot put | 19.40 m | |
| 2018 | Mediterranean Games | Tarragona, Spain | 12th | Shot put | 17.72 m | (Note: He threw a better measure in qualification: 18.55 m.) |
| 2018 | European Championships | Berlin, Germany | Qual | Shot put | 18.04 m | |
| 2019 | European U23 Championships | Gävle, Sweden | 2nd | Shot put | 20.50 m | |
| 2019 | World Championships | Doha, Qatar | 13th | Shot put | 20.75 m | (Note: He was the first thrower not admitted to the final.) |
| 2021 | Olympic Games | Tokyo, Japan | Qual | Shot put | 20.28 m | |
| 2022 | World Championships | Eugene, United States | Qual | Shot put | 19.73 m | (Note: He threw 21.35 (Q) in qualify.) |
| 2022 | European Championships | Munich, Germany | 7th | Shot put | 20.72 m | SB |
| 2023 | European Indoor Championships | Istanbul, Turkey | Finalist | Shot put | NM | |
| 2023 | World Championships | Budapest, Hungary | 2nd | Shot put | 22.34 m | SB |
| 2024 | World Indoor Championships | Glasgow, United Kingdom | 3rd | Shot put | 21.96 | |
| 2024 | European Championships | Rome, Italy | 1st | Shot put | 22.45 m | CR |
| 2024 | Olympic Games | Paris, France | 5th | Shot put | 21.70 m | |
| 2025 | European Indoor Championships | Apeldoorn, Netherlands | Qual | Shot put | 19.72 m | |
| 2025 | World Indoor Championships | Nanjing, China | 4th | Shot put | 21.36 m | |
| 2025 | World Championships | Tokyo, Japan | 3rd | Shot put | 21.94 m | |
| 2026 | European Championships | Birmingham, United Kingdom | 1st | Shot put | 22.31 m | |

== National titles ==
Fabbri won 12 national championships at individual senior level.

- Italian Athletics Championships
  - Shot put: 2019, 2020, 2023, 2024, 2025 (5)
- Italian Athletics Indoor Championships
  - Shot put: 2018, 2019, 2020, 2021, 2023, 2025, 2026 (7)

== See also ==
- Italian all-time lists - Shot put
