= Wictor Petersson =

Swedish shot putter (born 1998)

Personal information
- Born: 17 April 1998 (age 28)

Sport
- Sport: Athletics
- Event: Shot put
- Club: Hässleholms AIS (−2013); Malmö AI (2014−)
Medal record
Men's athletics
Representing Sweden
European Championships
Bronze medal – third place	2026 Birmingham	Shot put
European Indoor Championships
Silver medal – second place	2025 Apeldoorn	Shot put

Wictor Petersson (born 1 May 1998) is a Swedish athlete specialising in the shot put. He represented his country at the 2019 World Championships in Doha without reaching the final. Earlier that year he won a bronze medal at the European U23 Championships.

His personal bests in the event are 21.16 meters outdoors (Varberg 2025) and 21.49 meters indoors (Växjö 2025). He is the national record holder in both indoors and outdoors. He ranked 8th in the world for shot put as of mid-2025, but only ranked 15th as of 5 September 2025. He failed to get into the Top Ten for shot pot in the 2025 World Athletics Championships at Tokyo, ranking 11th in those games.

Petersson won the bronze medal in the shot put at the 2026 European Championships in Birmingham, England.

== International competitions ==
Year	Competition	Venue	Position	Event	Notes
Representing Sweden
2015	World Youth Championships	Cali, Colombia	3rd	Shot put (5 kg)	21.56
2015	World Youth Championships	Cali, Colombia	11th	Discus throw (1.5 kg)	53.02 m
2016	World U20 Championships	Bydgoszcz, Poland	2nd	Shot put (6 kg)	20.65 m
2016	World U20 Championships	Bydgoszcz, Poland	4th	Discus throw (1.75 kg)	61.23 m
2017	European U20 Championships	Grosseto, Italy	6th	Shot put (6 kg)	19.80 m
2017	European U20 Championships	Grosseto, Italy	8th	Discus throw (1.75 kg)	54.90 m
2019	European U23 Championships	Gävle, Sweden	3rd	Shot put	19.53 m
2019	World Championships	Doha, Qatar	19th (q)	Shot put	20.31 m
2021	European Indoor Championships	Toruń, Poland	5th	Shot put	20.75 m
2021	Olympic Games	Tokyo, Japan	28th (q)	Shot put	19.73 m
2022	World Indoor Championships	Belgrade, Serbia	12th	Shot put	20.33 m
2024	European Championships	Rome, Italy	12th	Shot put	19.45 m
2025	European Indoor Championships	Apeldoorn, Netherlands	2nd	Shot put	21.04 m
2025	World Indoor Championships	Nanjing, China	6th	Shot put	20.87 m
2025	World Championships	Tokyo, Japan	11th	Shot put	20.35 m
2026	World Indoor Championships	Toruń, Poland	5th	Shot put	21.12 m
2026	European Championships	Birmingham, United Kingdom	3rd	Shot put	20.97 m
