= Jason van Rooyen =

South African athlete (born 1997)

Personal information
- Full name: Jason Jullian van Rooyen
- Born: 3 February 1997 (age 29)

Sport
- Country: South Africa
- Sport: Athletics
- Event: Shot put

Achievements and titles
- Personal best: 21.14 m (69 ft 4 1/4 in) (2021)

Jason Jullian van Rooyen (born 4 February 1997) is a South African athlete who competes in the shot put.

He won gold at the 2014 African Youth Games in Botswana with a throw of 18.97m. At the 2014 Summer Youth Olympics in Nanjing, China, van Rooyen threw personal bests of 19.73m in qualifying and then 19.82m in the final, finishing fourth overall.

He competed in Taipei at the Athletics at the 2017 Summer Universiade – Men's shot put qualifying for the final with a throw of 18.90m who he didn’t better. He competed in Naples and the Athletics at the 2019 Summer Universiade – Men's shot put, finishing sixth with a throw of 19.53m.

Van Rooyen won on 29 April 2021 in Potchefstroom with a distance of 21.14 metres, qualifying for the delayed 2020 Tokyo Olympic Games. Along with Kyle Blignaut, it is the first time that two South African shot-putters have gone past the 21-metre marker in the same year. His personal best throw placed van Rooyen third on the all time South African list.
