= Nick Ponzio =

Italian shot putter

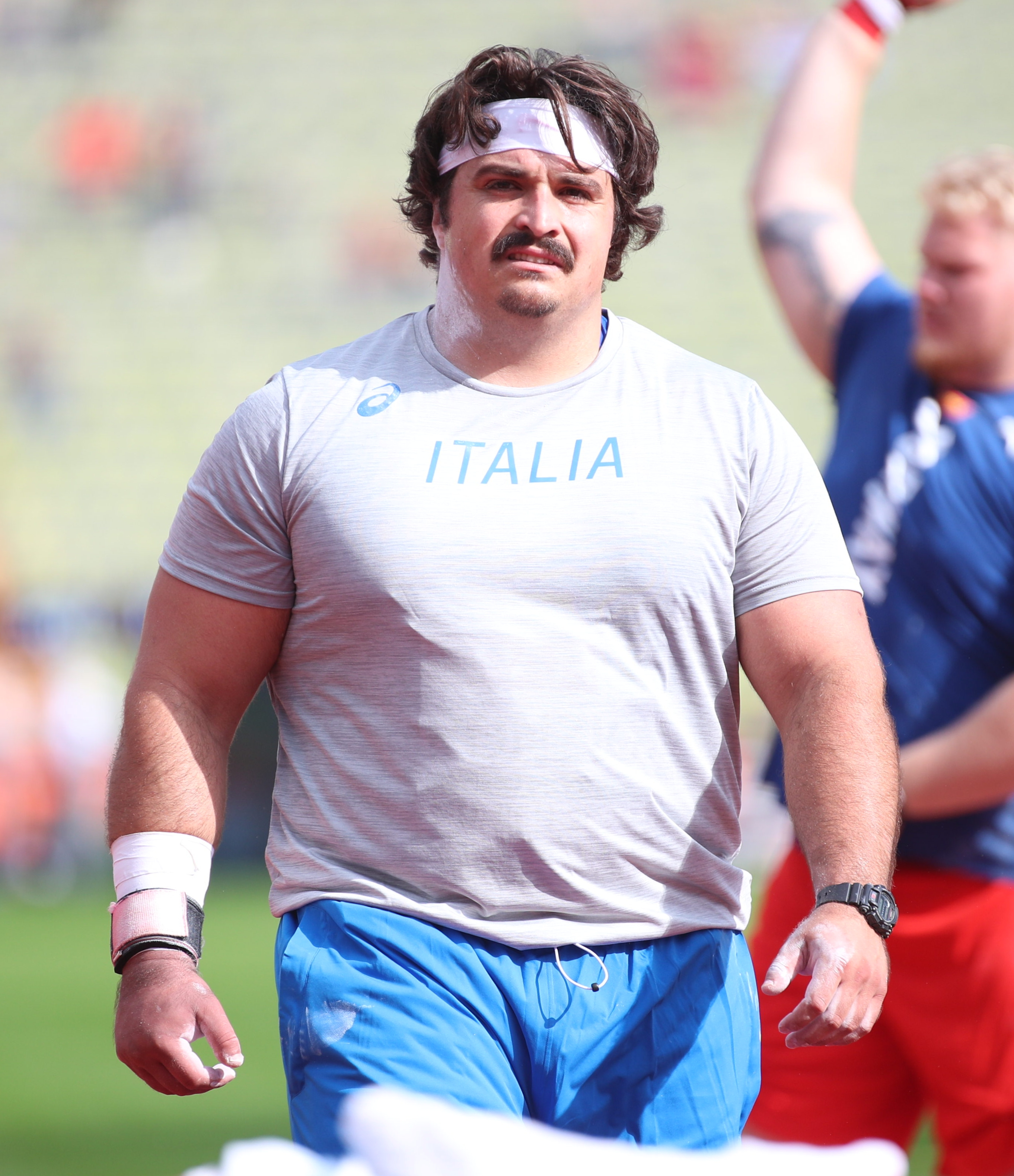
- Ponzio in 2022

Personal information
- Full name: Nicholas James Ponzio
- National team: Italy
- Born: 4 January 1995 (age 31) San Diego, California, United States

Sport
- Sport: Athletics
- Event: Shot put
- Club: Athletic Club 96 Alperia

Achievements and titles
- Personal bests: Shot put outdoor: 21.83 m (2022); Shot put indoor: 21.61 m (2022)
Medal record
Men's athletics
Representing Italy
European Throwing Cup
Gold medal – first place	2025 Nicosia	Shot put
Silver medal – second place	2022 Leiria	Shot put
Mediterranean Games
Gold medal – first place	2026 Taranto	Shot put

Nicholas James "Nick" Ponzio (born 4 January 1995) is an American-born Italian shot putter. He competed at the 2020 Summer Olympics.

Ponzio received an eighteen month competition ban to run from February 2023 to August 2024 for a whereabouts rules violation, although he never tested positive for drug use, he was given the ban for failing to update his whereabouts while competing in Europe.

== Career ==
Nick Ponzio obtained Italian citizenship on June 15 and the process for the recognition of eligibility to wear the azzurro jersey, at 27 June 2021, day after he won his first Italian national title was underway. On 29 June 2021, World Athletics gave him clearance from 15 June to qualify him for 2020 Olympics

== Personal bests ==
- Shot put: 21.83 m (Leiria, Portugal 13 March 2022)

== Achievements ==
Year	Competition	Venue	Rank	Event	Measure	Notes
2021	Olympic Games	(Japan) Tokyo	Qual	Shot put	20.80 m	
2022	European Throwing Cup	(Portugal) Leiria	2nd	Shot put	21.83 m	PB
2022	World Indoor Championships	(Serbia) Belgrade	7th	Shot put	21.30 m	
2022	World Championships	(United States) Eugene	9th	Shot put	20.81 m	(Note: He threw 21.35 (Q) in qualify)
2022	European Championships	(Germany) Munich	4th	Shot put	20.98 m	

== National titles ==
Ponzio won three national championship at individual senior level.

- Italian Athletics Championships
  - Shot put: 2021, 2022
- Italian Athletics Indoor Championships
  - Shot put: 2022
