= Jesper Arbinge =

Swedish shot putter

Personal information
- Born: 27 March 1997 (age 29)

Sport
- Sport: Athletics
- Event(s): Shot put, Hammer throw

Achievements and titles
- Personal best(s): Shot put: 20.44 m (2024); Hammer: 56.52 m (2025)
Medal record
Men's athletics
Representing Sweden
European Throwing Cup
| Bronze medal – third place | 2025 Nicosia | Shot put |

Jesper Arbinge (born 27 March 1997) is a Swedish athlete who competes in the shot put and the hammer throw. He has won the Swedish Athletics Championships in the shot put and in 2025 was a bronze medalist at the European Throwing Cup.

== Career ==
He is a member of Spårvägens FK. Having a second place finish and three third-place finishes at the Swedish national championships prior to 2022, Arbinge won the Swedish Athletics Championships in the shot put for the first time in August 2022.

He threw a personal best 19.84 metres in finishing as runner-up to Wictor Petersson at the 2024 Swedish Indoor Athletics Championships. He set a new personal best going over 20 metres for the first time that year, before increasing it again whilst competing outdoors in May, increasing his best by 41 centimetres, with a throw of 20.44 metres. He competed for Sweden in the shot put at the 2024 European Athletics Championships in Rome, Italy but his longest throw of 18.97 metres was not enough to progress to the final.

He won a bronze medal in the shot put at the 2025 European Throwing Cup in Nicosia in March 2025. He competed at the 2025 World Championships in Tokyo, Japan.
