= Adrian Piperi =

American shot putter

Personal information
- Nationality: United States
- Born: January 20, 1999 (age 27)

Sport
- Sport: Athletics
- Event: Shot put

Achievements and titles
- Personal bests: Shot put: 21.74 m (2021) indoor 22.29 m (2025) outdoor
Medal record
Men's athletics
Representing the United States
World Indoor Championships
Bronze medal – third place	2025 Nanjing	Shot put
World U20 Championships
Silver medal – second place	2018 Tampere	Shot put
World U18 Championships
Gold medal – first place	2015 Calì	Shot put

Adrian "Tripp" Piperi III (born January 20, 1999) is an American male shot putter who won the individual gold medal at the Youth World Championships. Three years later, he won the silver medal, a scant centimeter behind gold at the 2018 World U20 (Junior) Championships.

Competing for The Woodlands High School, he completed an undefeated senior season with the 2017 Texas State Championship in the shot put. Collegiately, he competed for the University of Texas.
