= Filip Mihaljević (shot putter) =

Croatian discus thrower and shot putter (born 1994)

Personal information
- Nationality: Croatian
- Born: 31 July 1994 (age 32) Livno, Bosnia and Herzegovina
- Height: 2.01 m (6 ft 7 in)
- Weight: 253 lb (115 kg)

Sport
- Sport: Track and field
- Events: Discus throw, Shot put
- Club: ASK Split

Achievements and titles
- Personal bests: DT: 63.76 m (Eugene, Oregon, 2017); SP: 21.94 m NR (Karlovac, 2021)
Medal record
Men's athletics
Representing Croatia
World Indoor Championships
Bronze medal – third place	2016 Portland	Shot put
European Championships
Gold medal – first place	2022 Munich	Shot put
Silver medal – second place	2024 Rome	Shot put
European Indoor Championships
Bronze medal – third place	2021 Toruń	Shot put
European Games
Silver medal – second place	2023 Kraków-Małopolska	Shot put
European Athletics U23 Championships
Gold medal – first place	2015 Tallinn	Shot put
European Junior Championships
Silver medal – second place	2013 Rieti	Shot put

Filip Mihaljević (born 31 July 1994) is a Croatian discus thrower and shot putter. He became European champion in shot put in 2022. He also won bronze medals at the 2016 World Indoor Championships and 2021 European Indoor Championships.

He holds Croatian national record in shot put.

== Early life ==
He was born in Livno in Herzegovina but moved to Split, Croatia. Until the age of 17 he played football, eventually switching to shot put.

== NCAA ==
He lived in Charlottesville, Virginia while attending the University of Virginia, where he trained under the tutelage of UVA Throws coach Martin Maric. Filip Mihaljević is a 3 time NCAA Division I Champion, 10 time All-American, 10 time Atlantic Coast Conference Champion, 2017 The Bowerman Award Semifinalist & 2017 ACC Outdoor Field Performer of the Year.

representing Virginia Cavaliers track and field
2017 NCAA Division I Outdoor Track and Field Championships	Shot Put	21.30 m (69 ft 10 1/2 in)	(gold) 1st
2017 NCAA Division I Outdoor Track and Field Championships	Discus	63.76 m (209 ft 2 in)	(gold) 1st
2017 Atlantic Coast Conference Outdoor Track and Field Championships	Shot Put	19.60 m (64 ft 3 1/2 in)	(gold) 1st
2017 Atlantic Coast Conference Outdoor Track and Field Championships	Discus	58.55 m (192 ft 1 in)	(gold) 1st
2017 NCAA Division I Indoor Track and Field Championships	Shot Put	Foul	16th
2017 Atlantic Coast Conference Indoor Track and Field Championships	Shot Put	19.97 m (65 ft 6 in)	(gold) 1st
2016 NCAA Division I Outdoor Track and Field Championships	Shot Put	21.71 m (71 ft 2 1/2 in)	(gold) 1st
2016 NCAA Division I Outdoor Track and Field Championships	Discus	60.28 m (197 ft 9 in)	5th
2016 Atlantic Coast Conference Outdoor Track and Field Championships	Shot Put	19.83 m (65 ft 1/2 in)	(gold) 1st
2016 Atlantic Coast Conference Outdoor Track and Field Championships	Discus	62.43 m (204 ft 9 3/4 in)	(gold) 1st
2016 NCAA Division I Indoor Track and Field Championships	Shot Put	20.47 m (67 ft 1 3/4 in)	(silver) 2nd
2016 Atlantic Coast Conference Indoor Track and Field Championships	Shot Put	20.04 m (65 ft 8 3/4 in)	(gold) 1st
2015 NCAA Division I Outdoor Track and Field Championships	Shot Put	19.51 m (64 ft 0 in)	9th
2015 NCAA Division I Outdoor Track and Field Championships	Discus	61.39 m (201 ft 4 3/4 in)	(bronze) 3rd
2015 Atlantic Coast Conference Outdoor Track and Field Championships	Shot Put	19.10 m (62 ft 7 3/4 in)	(gold) 1st
2015 Atlantic Coast Conference Outdoor Track and Field Championships	Discus	60.57 m (198 ft 8 1/2 in)	(gold) 1st
2015 NCAA Division I Indoor Track and Field Championships	Shot Put	18.40 m (60 ft 4 1/4 in)	14th
2015 Atlantic Coast Conference Indoor Track and Field Championships	Shot Put	18.88 m (61 ft 11 1/4 in)	(gold) 1st
2014 NCAA Division I Outdoor Track and Field Championships	Shot Put	19.56 m (64 ft 2 in)	7th
2014 NCAA Division I Outdoor Track and Field Championships	Discus	58.86 m (193 ft 1 1/4 in)	8th
2014 Atlantic Coast Conference Outdoor Track and Field Championships	Shot Put	17.79 m (58 ft 4 1/4 in)	(bronze) 3rd
2014 Atlantic Coast Conference Outdoor Track and Field Championships	Discus	55.38 m (181 ft 8 1/4 in)	(gold) 1st

== Career ==
He won a silver medal at the 2013 European Athletics Junior Championships shot put event, with a throw of 20.23 m (66 ft 4 in).

He won a gold medal at the 2015 European Athletics U23 Championships shot put event, with a throw of 19.35 m (63 ft 6 in).

On 23 January 2016 Mihaljević won the shot put competition at Rod McCravy Memorial in Lexington, Kentucky with 20.69 m and thus qualified to the 2016 Olympic Games in Rio de Janeiro.

On 18 March 2016, competing at his very first senior world championships, in Portland, Mihaljević won the bronze medal in shot put competition with 20.87 m, his personal best.

In 2017, Filip become one of the few throwers who managed to capture both NCAA Outdoor Shot Put and Discus titles with 21.30m and 63.76m respectively.
