= Giorgi Mujaridze =

Georgian shot putter

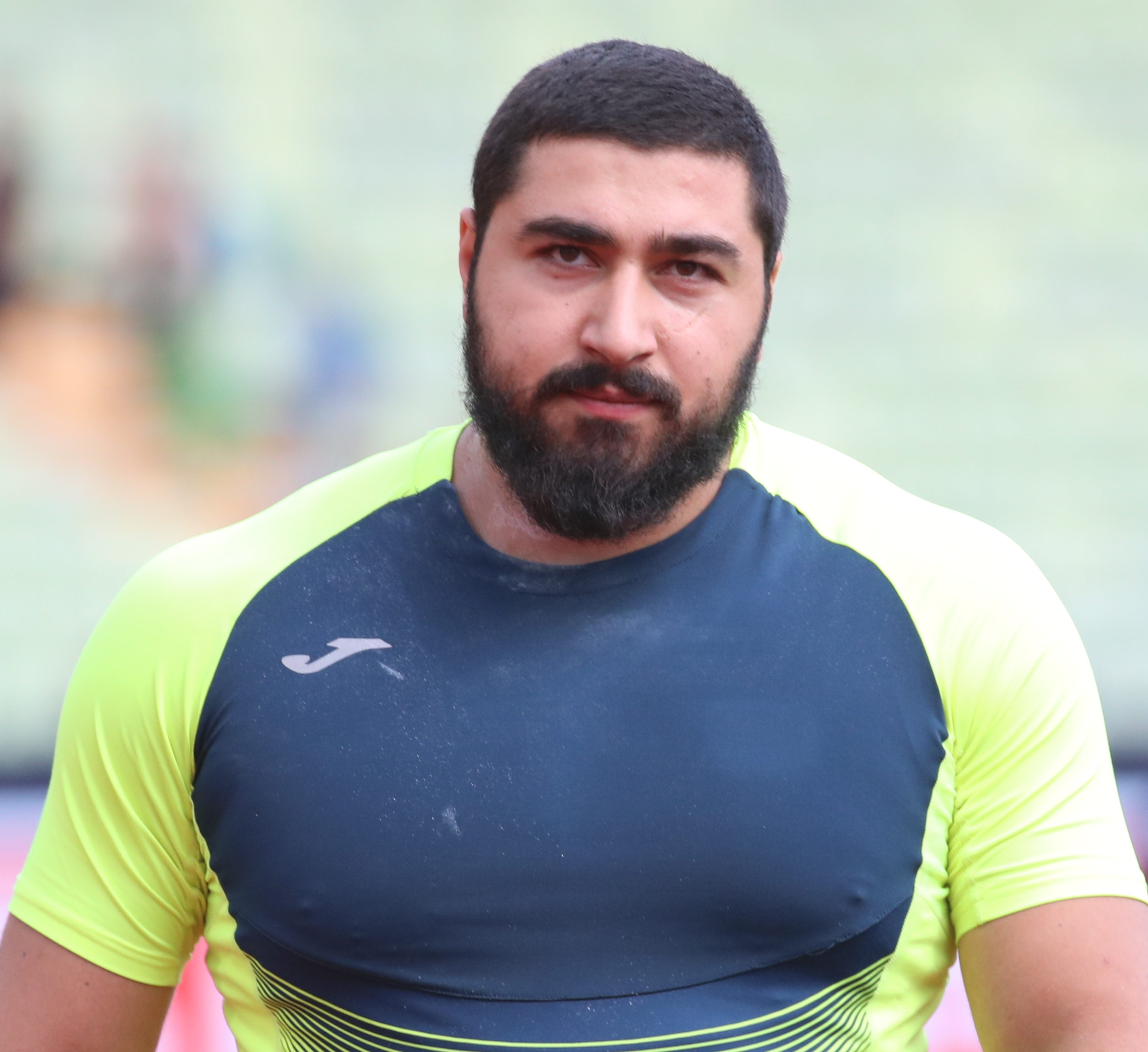
- Mujaridze in 2022

Personal information
- Born: 22 March 1998 (age 28) Gori, Georgia
- Height: 189 cm (6 ft 2 in)
- Weight: 122 kg (269 lb)

Sport
- Sport: Athletics
- Event: Shot put
- Coached by: Davit mantidze

Giorgi Mujaridze (Georgian: გიორგი მუჯარიძე; born 22 March 1998) is a Georgian athlete specialising in the shot put. He won a gold medal in the event at the 2018 Championships of the Small States of Europe.

His personal bests are 20.27 metres outdoors (Cairo 2016) and 21.21 metres indoors, the latter being a national record.

Giorgi Mujaridze has won a historic victory at the European Throwing Cup 2019 in shot put.

The athlete threw 20.27 meters in the shot put competition, obtaining the best result for the 23 and under age group in Samorin, Slovakia.

Giorgi Mujaridze has broken the championship's record and was ranked first among his 14 rivals.

Mujairdze is the first athlete to win gold on behalf of Georgia in this competition.

He competed in the shot put at the 2020 Summer Olympics.
