= Scott Lincoln =

English shot putter (born 1993)

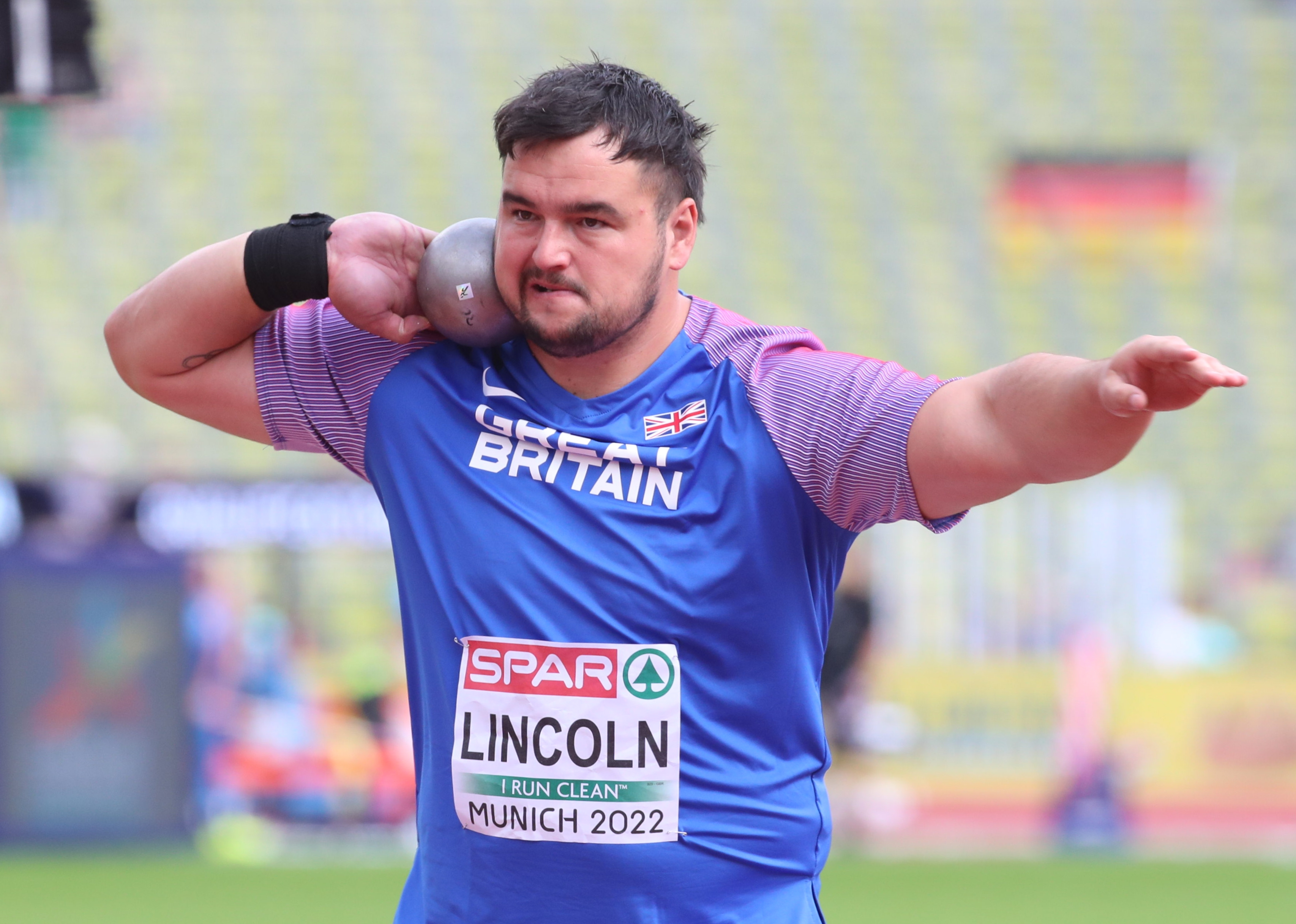
- Lincoln in 2022

Personal information
- Born: 7 May 1993 (age 33) Northallerton, England

Sport
- Sport: Athletics
- Event: Shot put
- Club: City of York
- Coached by: Paul Wilson
Medal record
Athletics
Representing Great Britain
European Games
Bronze medal – third place	2023 Kraków-Małopolska	Shot put
Representing England
Commonwealth Games
Bronze medal – third place	2022 Birmingham	Shot put
Bronze medal – third place	2026 Glasgow	Shot put

Scott T. Lincoln (born 7 May 1993) is an English athlete specialising in the shot put. He is a ten-time British champion outdoors and competed at the 2020 Summer Olympics and 2024 Summer Olympics.

== Biography ==
In 2020 he became a six times British champion when winning the shot put event at the 2020 British Athletics Championships with a throw of 19.65 metres. At the delayed 2020 Olympic Games in Tokyo, he represented Great Britain for his first Olympic appearance.

He represented England at the 2022 Commonwealth Games in Birmingham, where he won a bronze medal.

After winning the shot put gold medal at the 2024 British Athletics Championships (his 10th consecutive British title and equalling the record by Carl Mysercough), Lincoln was subsequently named in the Great Britain team for the 2024 Summer Olympicsbut he failed to make the final.

He threw a personal best of 21.31m at the Golden Spike Grand Prix in Ostrava in May 2024. Lincoln moved to Melbourne, Australia and returned to the UK to break Myerscough's record by winning his 11th British title at the 2025 UK Athletics Championships. After an eighth-placed finish at the 2025 World Athletics Championships in Tokyo, Lincoln won his tenth national indoor title at the 2026 British Indoor Athletics Championships on 15 February 2026.
