= Tom Walsh (shot putter) =

New Zealand shot putter

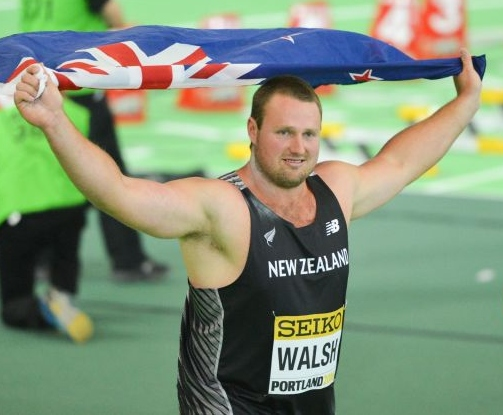
- Walsh in 2016, after winning gold at the World Indoor Championships

Personal information
- Full name: Tomas Walsh
- Nationality: New Zealand
- Born: 1 March 1992 (age 34) Timaru, New Zealand
- Height: 1.85 m (6 ft 1 in)
- Weight: 120 kg (265 lb)

Sport
- Country: New Zealand
- Sport: Track and field
- Event: Shot put
- Club: South Canterbury Athletic Club
- Coached by: Ian Baird

Achievements and titles
- National finals: Shot put champion (2012, 2013, 2014, 2015, 2016, 2017, 2018, 2019, 2020, 2021, 2022, 2025, 2026)
- Personal bests: 22.90 m (outdoor); 22.31 m (indoor) (CR)
Medal record
Men's athletics
Representing New Zealand
Olympic Games
Bronze medal – third place	2016 Rio de Janeiro	Shot put
Bronze medal – third place	2020 Tokyo	Shot put
World Championships
Gold medal – first place	2017 London	Shot put
Bronze medal – third place	2019 Doha	Shot put
World Indoor Championships
Gold medal – first place	2016 Portland	Shot put
Gold medal – first place	2018 Birmingham	Shot put
Gold medal – first place	2025 Nanjing	Shot put
Gold medal – first place	2026 Toruń	Shot put
Silver medal – second place	2024 Glasgow	Shot put
Bronze medal – third place	2014 Sopot	Shot put
Bronze medal – third place	2022 Belgrade	Shot put
Commonwealth Games
Gold medal – first place	2022 Birmingham	Shot put
Gold medal – first place	2018 Gold Coast	Shot put
Silver medal – second place	2014 Glasgow	Shot put
Silver medal – second place	2026 Glasgow	Shot put

Tomas Walsh (born 1 March 1992) is a New Zealand athlete who competes mainly in the shot put. He is the current national record holder both outdoors and indoors for the event. His personal best of 22.90 m (75 ft 1 1/2 in), set in Doha, 5 October 2019, is also the Oceanian record and makes him the seventh best shot putter in history.

Walsh was the bronze medallist at the 2014 IAAF World Indoor Championships, the silver medallist at the 2014 Commonwealth Games, 4th at the 2015 World Championships in Athletics, winner of the 2016 IAAF World Indoor Championships, the bronze medallist at the 2016 Summer Olympics, the gold medallist at the 2017 World Championships and the bronze medallist at the 2019 World Championships, 2022 World Athletics Indoor Championships and the 2020 Summer Olympics, and gold medallist at the 2022 Commonwealth Games.

== Athletics career ==
Walsh made his international debut at the 2009 World Youth Championships in Athletics, where he placed sixth in the shot put and also competed in the qualifying of the discus throw. On 12 December 2009 Walsh threw 20.21 m (66 ft 3 1/2 in) with the 5 kg shot to win the Senior Boys title at the New Zealand National Secondary School Track and Field Championships. This performance was a New Zealand Youth (Under 18) record, which was broken the following day by Jacko Gill when winning the Junior Boys (Under 16) title.

Walsh broke the New Zealand junior record on 18 March 2010 with a put of 18.82 m (61 ft 8 3/4 in) with the 6 kg shot but this was broken 9 days later by Gill with 19.92 m (65 ft 4 1/4 in). At the 2010 World Junior Championships in Athletics Walsh failed to qualify for the final of the shot put which was won by Gill.

In 2012 Walsh won his first senior national shot put title which he retained the following season and also added the discus title. On 12 December 2013 Walsh broke Gill's New Zealand senior shot put record with 20.61 m (67 ft 7 1/4 in) in Melbourne, Australia which he improved with 21.16 m (69 ft 5 in) on 22 March 2014, also in Melbourne.

At the 2014 IAAF World Indoor Championships, in his first senior international competition and first ever competition indoors, Walsh finished third in the men's shot put. He set an indoor national record of 20.41 m (66 ft 11 1/2 in) in the qualifying round and improved upon this mark three times in the final finishing with 21.26 m (69 ft 9 in) which was an Oceanian indoor record and the same distance as the Oceanian outdoor record.

Later in 2014, Walsh improved his outdoor personal best and the New Zealand record with 21.23 m (69 ft 7 3/4 in) at the 2014 IAAF Diamond League meet in Glasgow on 11 July, before improving again to 21.24 m (69 ft 8 in) on 27 July, during the qualifying round at the 2014 Commonwealth Games, which was a Commonwealth Games record. In the final, Walsh won the silver medal behind O'Dayne Richards.

In 2015, Walsh defended his New Zealand shot put title with a throw of 20.73 m (68 ft 0 in) on 8 March, before setting a new Oceanian record of 21.37 m (70 ft 1 1/4 in) on 21 March at the Melbourne Track Classic.

Walsh finished fourth at the 2015 World Championships on 23 August in Beijing, throwing a new personal best of 21.58m. He was just 11 cm off the bronze medal. He improved his personal best to 21.62m on 8 September in winning the shot put at the Hanžeković Memorial in Zagreb. On 11 September Walsh won his first Diamond League meet with a throw of 21.39m in Brussels.

In the 2016 World Indoor Championships, Walsh won the gold medal with a throw of 21.78m, breaking his own New Zealand national and Oceania area indoor records three times in the process. He went on to take the bronze medal at the Rio de Janeiro Olympic Games, with 21.36m, and the following year won the 2017 IAAF World Championships with 22.03m.

Walsh retained his World Indoor title at the 2018 World Indoor Championships, with a then personal best of 22.31m. He surpassed this with 22.67m on 25 March the same year, at the Sir Graeme Douglas International Track Challenge in West Auckland, New Zealand, moving him into the top-10 World All-Time.

At the 2018 Commonwealth Games in Gold Coast, Australia, Walsh threw 22.45m, setting a new Commonwealth Games record en route to qualify for the Shot Put Men's final.

In 2019, Walsh threw 22.90m in the first round of the 2019 World Athletics Championships to set a new Oceanian record. He finished in third place.

At the 2020 Summer Olympics in Tokyo, Walsh took third place once again, with a throw of 22.47m. At the 2022 World Athletics Indoor Championships, Walsh equalled his own indoor Oceanian record.

== Personal life ==
Walsh works part-time as a builder in Timaru.

Tom's father, Peter, won the New Zealand junior men's shot put in the 1964–65 season and was a member of the 1974 South Canterbury Rugby side that won the Ranfurly Shield.

== Statistics ==
=== Personal bests ===
Outdoor

- Shot put – 22.90 m (75 ft 1 1/2 in) Doha (2019) Commonwealth Record AR NR
- Discus throw – 53.58 m (175 ft 9 1/4 in) (2014)

Indoor

- Shot put – 22.31 m (73 ft 2 1/4 in) (2018, 2022) AR NR

=== Shot put season's best ===
Senior implement weight (7.26 kg) only.

Year	Performance	Competition	Location	Date	World ranking
2010	17.57 m		Waitakere, New Zealand	20 February	
2011	18.83 m		North Shore, New Zealand	5 December	123
2012	19.33 m		Amiens, France	30 June	111=
2013	20.61 m		Melbourne, Australia	12 December	22=
2014	21.26 m (i)	World Indoor Championships	Sopot, Poland	7 March	11
2014	21.24 m	Commonwealth Games	Glasgow, Scotland	27 July	11
2015	21.62 m	Hanžeković Memorial	Zagreb, Croatia	7 September	5
2016	22.21 m	Hanžeković Memorial	Zagreb, Croatia	5 September	2
2017	22.14 m	World Championships	London, England	5 August	
2018	22.31 m	2018 IAAF World Indoor Championships	Birmingham, England	3 March	
2018	22.67 m	Sir Graeme Douglas International Track Challenge	West Auckland, New Zealand	25 March	
2019	22.90 m	2019 World Athletics Championships	Doha, Qatar	5 October	=2
2020	21.70 m	New Zealand National Champs	Christchurch, New Zealand	6 March	

== Competition record ==
Year	Competition	Venue	Position	Event	Result	Notes
2009	World Youth Championships	Brixen, Italy	6th	Shot put (5 kg)	19.60 m	
2009	World Youth Championships	Brixen, Italy	31st (q)	Discus throw (1.5 kg)	48.83 m	
2010	World Junior Championships	Moncton, Canada	16th (q)	Shot put (6 kg)	17.92 m	
2014	World Indoor Championships	Sopot, Poland	3rd	Shot put	21.26 m	
2014	Commonwealth Games	Glasgow, United Kingdom	2nd	Shot put	21.19 m	
2015	World Championships	Beijing, China	4th	Shot put	21.58 m	
2016	World Indoor Championships	Portland, United States	1st	Shot put	21.78 m	
2016	Olympic Games	Rio de Janeiro, Brazil	3rd	Shot put	21.36 m	
2017	World Championships	London, United Kingdom	1st	Shot put	22.03 m	
2018	World Indoor Championships	Birmingham, United Kingdom	1st	Shot put	22.31 m	
2018	Commonwealth Games	Gold Coast, Australia	1st	Shot put	21.41 m	(Note: 22.45 m GR in qualifying)
2019	World Championships	Doha, Qatar	3rd	Shot put	22.90 m	
2021	Olympic Games	Tokyo, Japan	3rd	Shot put	22.47 m	
2022	World Indoor Championships	Belgrade, Serbia	3rd	Shot put	22.31 m	
2022	World Championships	Eugene, United States	4th	Shot put	22.08 m	
2022	Commonwealth Games	Birmingham, United Kingdom	1st	Shot put	22.26m	
2023	World Championships	Budapest, Hungary	4th	Shot put	22.05 m	
2024	World Indoor Championships	Glasgow, United Kingdom	2nd	Shot put	22.07 m	
2024	Olympic Games	Paris, France	5th (q)	Shot put	21.48 m	(Note: No mark in the final)
2025	World Indoor Championships	Nanjing, China	1st	Shot put	21.65 m	
2025	World Championships	Tokyo, Japan	4th	Shot put	21.94 m	
2026	World Indoor Championships	Torun, Poland	1st	Shot put	21.82 m	
2026	Commonwealth Games	Glasgow, United Kingdom	2nd	Shot put	21.03 m	

== Notes ==
Awards
Preceded by Mahé Drysdale	New Zealand's Sportsman of the Year; 2017, 2018	Succeeded by Israel Adesanya
Preceded by Emirates Team New Zealand	Halberg Awards – Supreme Award; 2018	Succeeded by Silver Ferns
