= 2017 World Championships in Athletics – Men's shot put =

Men's shot put at the 2017 World Championships
- Venue: Olympic Stadium
- Dates: 5 August (qualification); 6 August (final)
- Competitors: 32 from 21 nations
- Winning distance: 22.03 m (72 ft 3 1/4 in)

Medalists
| gold medal | Tomas Walsh | New Zealand |
| silver medal | Joe Kovacs | United States |
| bronze medal | Stipe Žunić | Croatia |

Video on YouTube Official Video

The men's shot put at the 2017 World Championships in Athletics was held at the Olympic Stadium on 5–6 August.

== Summary ==
2016 Olympic champion, #7 all-time and the 2017 season leader Ryan Crouser was the favourite, having won every single meet of the season leading up to the Championships. Nine athletes reached the automatic qualification mark of 20.75m in the qualification round. The defending world champion Joe Kovacs and the European U23 champion Konrad Bukowiecki qualified for the final as non-automatic qualifiers.

In the final Joe Kovacs led after the first round with a put of 21.48 metres, and in the second round he was overtaken by Tomas Walsh with 21.64 metres while Stipe Žunić moved into third with 21.46 metres. The order of the top three never subsequently changed, although Walsh and Kovacs both improved their distances in the third round. In the final round Kovacs put beyond the 22 metre line, but this was a foul throw. Already the winner, Walsh finished with his best put of 22.03 metres.

== Records ==
Before the competition records were as follows:

| Record | Perf. | Athlete | Nat. | Date | Location |
|---|---|---|---|---|---|
| World | 23.12 | Randy Barnes | USA | 20 May 1990 | Westwood, CA, United States |
| Championship | 22.23 | Werner Günthör | SUI | 29 Aug 1987 | Rome, Italy |
| World leading | 22.65 | Ryan Crouser | USA | 25 Jun 2017 | Sacramento, CA, United States |
| African | 21.97 | Janus Robberts | RSA | 2 Jun 2001 | Eugene, OR, United States |
| Asian | 21.13 | Sultan Abdulmajeed Al-Hebshi | KSA | 8 May 2009 | Doha, Qatar |
| NACAC | 23.12 | Randy Barnes | USA | 20 May 1990 | Westwood, CA, United States |
| South American | 21.82 | Darlan Romani | BRA | 3 Jun 2017 | São Bernardo do Campo, Brazil |
| European | 23.06 | Ulf Timmermann | GDR | 22 May 1988 | Chania, Greece |
| Oceanian | 22.21 | Tomas Walsh | NZL | 5 Sep 2016 | Zagreb, Croatia |

No records were set at the competition.

== Qualification standard ==
The standard to qualify automatically for entry was 20.50 metres.

== Schedule ==
The event schedule, in local time (UTC+1), was as follows:

| Date | Time | Round |
|---|---|---|
| 5 August | 10:00 | Qualification |
| 6 August | 20:35 | Final |

== Results ==
=== Qualification ===
The qualification round took on 5 August, in two groups, with Group A starting at 10:00 and Group B starting at 10:01. Athletes attaining a mark of at least 20.75 metres ( Q ) or at least the 12 best performers ( q ) qualified for the final. The overall results were as follows:

| Rank | Group | Name | Nationality | Round | | | Mark | Notes |
| Rank | Group | Name | Nationality | 1 | 2 | 3 | Mark | Notes |
|---|---|---|---|---|---|---|---|---|
| 1 | A | Tomas Walsh | New Zealand | 22.14 | | | 22.14 | Q, SB |
| 2 | B | David Storl | Germany | 21.41 | | | 21.41 | Q |
| 3 | A | Michał Haratyk | Poland | 21.27 | | | 21.27 | Q |
| 4 | A | Darrell Hill | United States | x | x | 21.11 | 21.11 | Q |
| 5 | B | Jacko Gill | New Zealand | 20.96 | | | 20.96 | Q |
| 6 | B | Ryan Crouser | United States | 20.90 | | | 20.90 | Q |
| 7 | B | Stipe Žunić | Croatia | 20.86 | | | 20.86 | Q |
| 8 | B | Ryan Whiting | United States | 20.84 | | | 20.84 | Q |
| 9 | B | Tomáš Stanek | Czech Republic | 20.76 | | | 20.76 | Q |
| 10 | A | Joe Kovacs | United States | 20.62 | 20.67 | x | 20.67 | q |
| 11 | A | Andrei Gag | Romania | 20.31 | x | 20.61 | 20.61 | q, SB |
| 12 | B | Konrad Bukowiecki | Poland | x | 20.11 | 20.55 | 20.55 | q |
| 13 | A | Jakub Szyszkowski | Poland | 19.13 | 19.50 | 20.54 | 20.54 | |
| 14 | A | Filip Mihaljević | Croatia | x | x | 20.33 | 20.33 | |
| 15 | B | Darlan Romani | Brazil | x | 20.21 | 19.91 | 20.21 | |
| 16 | A | Tim Nedow | Canada | 19.66 | 20.09 | 20.03 | 20.09 | |
| 17 | A | Tsanko Arnaudov | Portugal | 19.83 | 20.02 | 20.08 | 20.08 | |
| 18 | A | Ladislav Prášil | Czech Republic | 20.04 | 19.76 | 19.92 | 20.04 | |
| 19 | A | O'Dayne Richards | Jamaica | x | 19.84 | 19.95 | 19.95 | |
| 20 | B | Damien Birkinhead | Australia | 19.90 | 19.79 | 19.50 | 19.90 | |
| 21 | A | Mesud Pezer | Bosnia and Herzegovina | x | 19.51 | 19.88 | 19.88 | |
| 22 | A | Carlos Tobalina | Spain | 19.38 | 19.87 | x | 19.87 | |
| 23 | A | Orazio Cremona | South Africa | 19.81 | 19.61 | 19.35 | 19.81 | |
| 24 | A | Franck Elemba | Congo | 19.18 | 19.74 | 19.40 | 19.74 | |
| 25 | B | Chukwuebuka Enekwechi | Nigeria | 19.27 | 19.70 | 19.72 | 19.72 | |
| 26 | A | Aleksandr Lesnoy | Authorised Neutral Athletes | x | 19.67 | x | 19.67 | |
| 27 | B | Jaco Engelbrecht | South Africa | 18.62 | 19.59 | 19.56 | 19.59 | |
| 28 | B | Aliaksei Nichypar | Belarus | 19.39 | 19.54 | 19.41 | 19.54 | |
| 29 | B | Francisco Belo | Portugal | 18.28 | 19.47 | x | 19.47 | |
| 30 | B | Mostafa Amr Hassan | Egypt | 19.23 | x | 19.15 | 19.23 | |
| 31 | B | Bob Bertemes | Luxembourg | x | 18.93 | 19.10 | 19.10 | |
| 32 | B | Hamza Alić | Bosnia and Herzegovina | x | 18.95 | x | 18.95 | |

=== Final ===
The final took place on 6 August at 20:35. The results were as follows:

| Rank | Name | Nationality | Round | | | | | | Mark | Notes |
| Rank | Name | Nationality | 1 | 2 | 3 | 4 | 5 | 6 | Mark | Notes |
|---|---|---|---|---|---|---|---|---|---|---|
| 1st place, gold medalist(s) | Tomas Walsh | New Zealand | 21.38 | 21.64 | 21.75 | 21.70 | 21.63 | 22.03 | 22.03 | |
| 2nd place, silver medalist(s) | Joe Kovacs | United States | 21.48 | 20.88 | 21.66 | x | 21.17 | x | 21.66 | |
| 3rd place, bronze medalist(s) | Stipe Žunić | Croatia | 21.01 | 21.46 | 21.04 | 21.08 | x | x | 21.46 | |
| 4 | Tomáš Staněk | Czech Republic | 21.04 | 21.41 | x | x | x | 20.99 | 21.41 | |
| 5 | Michał Haratyk | Poland | 20.49 | 20.52 | 21.00 | 20.83 | 21.41 | 20.98 | 21.41 | |
| 6 | Ryan Crouser | United States | 21.07 | 21.09 | x | x | 21.20 | 21.14 | 21.20 | |
| 7 | Ryan Whiting | United States | 20.82 | x | 20.66 | x | x | 21.09 | 21.09 | |
| 8 | Konrad Bukowiecki | Poland | x | 20.65 | 20.89 | x | x | x | 20.89 | |
| 9 | Jacko Gill | New Zealand | 20.36 | 19.82 | 20.82 | | | | 20.82 | |
| 10 | David Storl | Germany | x | x | 20.80 | | | | 20.80 | |
| 11 | Darrell Hill | United States | 20.79 | 20.56 | x | | | | 20.79 | |
| 12 | Andrei Gag | Romania | 19.96 | x | x | | | | 19.96 | |
