= Athletics at the 2019 Pan American Games – Men's shot put =

Men's shot put at the 2019 Pan American Games
- Venue: Athletics Stadium
- Dates: August 7
- Competitors: 13 from 10 nations
- Winning distance: 22.07

Medalists
Gold medal	Darlan Romani	Brazil
Silver medal	Jordan Geist	United States
Bronze medal	Uziel Muñoz	Mexico

The men's shot put competition of the athletics events at the 2019 Pan American Games took place on 7 August at the 2019 Pan American Games Athletics Stadium. The defending Pan American Games champion was O'Dayne Richards from Jamaica.

== Records ==
Prior to this competition, the existing world and Pan American Games records were as follows:

World record	Randy Barnes (USA)	23.12 m	Los Angeles, United States	May 20, 1990
Pan American Games record	O'Dayne Richards (JAM)	21.69 m	Toronto, Canada	July 21, 2015

== Schedule ==
Date	Time	Round
August 7, 2019	17:50	Final

== Results ==
All distances shown are in meters.

KEY:	q	Fastest non-qualifiers	Q	Qualified	NR	National record	PB	Personal best	SB	Seasonal best	DQ	Disqualified

=== Final ===
The results were as follows:

Rank	Name	Nationality	#1	#2	#3	#4	#5	#6	Mark	Notes
1st place, gold medalist(s)	Darlan Romani	Brazil	20.81	20.92	21.19	21.16	21.54	22.07	22.07	GR
2nd place, silver medalist(s)	Jordan Geist	United States	19.07	20.16	19.56	19.27	19.78	20.67	20.67	
3rd place, bronze medalist(s)	Uziel Muñoz	Mexico	20.06	20.03	x	20.32	20.35	20.56	20.56	
4	Tim Nedow	Canada	20.47	19.58	20.09	19.84	19.76	20.48	20.48	
5	O'Dayne Richards	Jamaica	x	19.27	x	19.71	19.92	20.07	20.07	
6	Eldred Henry	British Virgin Islands	18.51	19.82	18.90	x	19.19	x	19.82	
7	Welington Morais	Brazil	x	19.09	18.77	18.57	19.22	18.98	19.22	
8	Ashinia Miller	Jamaica	x	18.62	19.17	18.65	x	x	19.17	
9	Olayinka Awotunde	United States	18.53	x	19.04				19.04	
10	Zachary Short	Honduras	18.34	18.62	18.28				18.62	
11	Santiago Basso	Chile	18.17	18.38	x				18.38	
12	Wimana Stewart	Trinidad and Tobago	18.25	17.86	17.87				18.25	
	Dillon Simon	Dominica	x	x	x				NM	
