= Athletics at the 2022 Commonwealth Games – Men's shot put =

Men's shot put at the 2022 Commonwealth Games
- Venue: Alexander Stadium
- Dates: 5 August
- Competitors: 11 from 8 nations
- Winning distance: 22.26

Medalists
gold medal	Tom Walsh	New Zealand
silver medal	Jacko Gill	New Zealand
bronze medal	Scott Lincoln	England

The men's shot put at the 2022 Commonwealth Games, as part of the athletics programme, took place in the Alexander Stadium on 5 August 2022.

== Records ==
Prior to this competition, the existing world and Games records were as follows:

World record	Ryan Crouser (USA)	23.37 m	Eugene, United States	18 June 2021
Commonwealth record	Tom Walsh (NZL)	22.90 m	Doha, Qatar	5 October 2019
Games record	Tom Walsh (NZL)	22.45 m	Gold Coast, Australia	8 April 2018

== Schedule ==
The schedule was as follows:

Date	Time	Round
Friday 5 August 2022	19:06	Final

All times are British Summer Time (UTC+1)

== Results ==
=== Final ===
The medals were determined in the final.

Rank	Name	#1	#2	#3	#4	#5	#6	Result	Notes
1st place, gold medalist(s)	Tom Walsh (NZL)	21.98	21.46	21.52	21.84	21.05	22.26	22.26	
2nd place, silver medalist(s)	Jacko Gill (NZL)	20.48	20.88	20.41	21.20	21.29	21.90	21.90	PB
3rd place, bronze medalist(s)	Scott Lincoln (ENG)	19.80	x	19.67	x	20.57	20.11	20.57	
4	Chukwuebuka Enekwechi (NGR)	x	19.97	20.33	20.32	20.24	20.36	20.36	
5	Eldred Henry (IVB)	x	19.97	19.61	x	19.12	x	19.97	SB
6	O'Dayne Richards (JAM)	18.57	19.08	19.13	18.99	19.39	19.90	19.90	
7	Kyle Blignaut (RSA)	18.78	19.23	x	x	x	x	19.23	
8	Akeem Stewart (TTO)	18.01	18.03	18.56	x	x	–	18.56	
9	Dillon Simon (DMA)	16.97	x	17.42				17.42	
10	Djimon Gumbs (IVB)	17.18	x	16.75				17.18	
11	Mohammad Jamshad Ali (PAK)	x	15.72	x				15.72	
12	Jonathan-Deiwea Detageouwa (NRU)	15.12	15.41	x				15.41	PB
