= Darrell Hill (shot putter) =

American shot putter (born 1993)

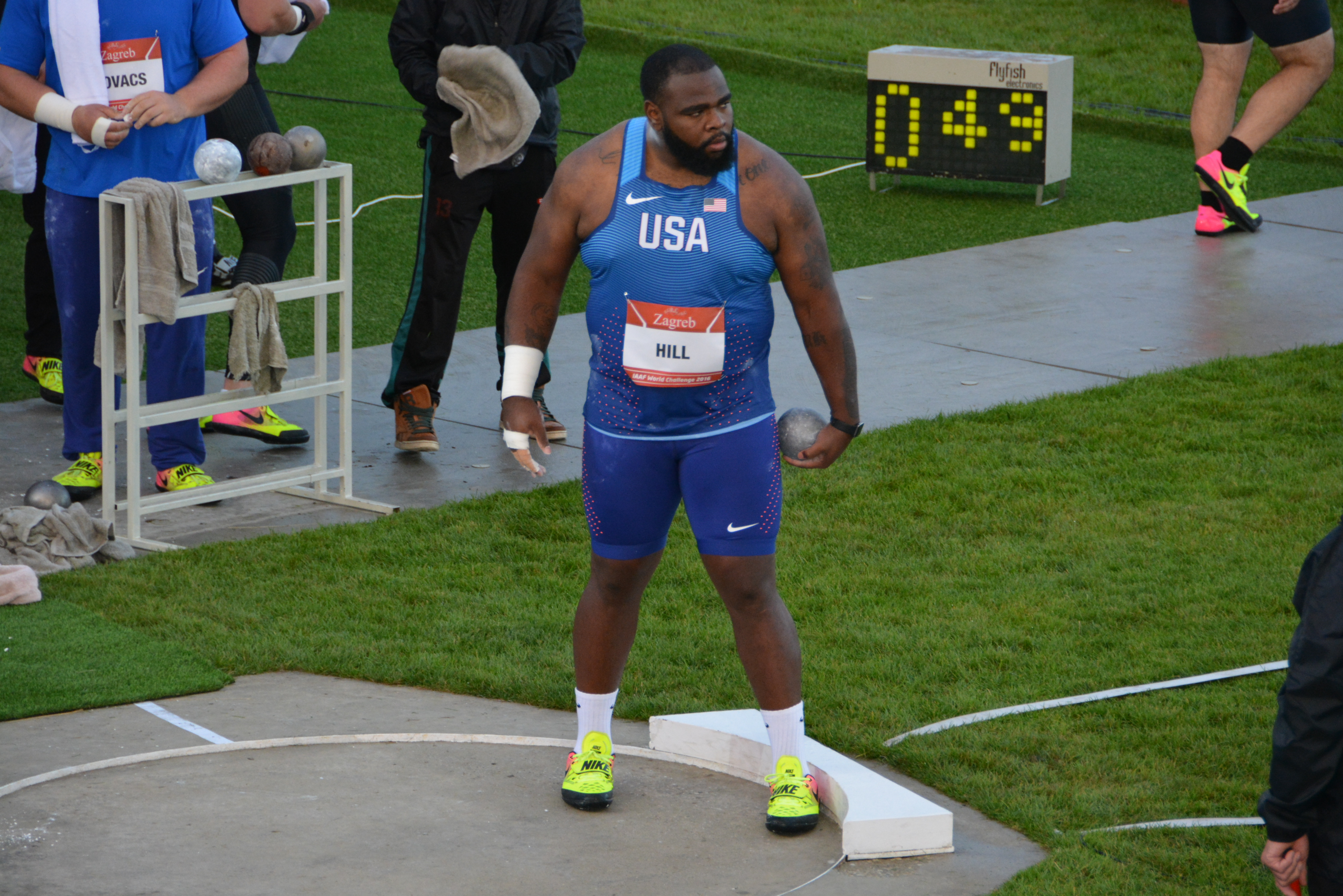
- Hill at the 2016 Hanžeković Memorial

Personal information
- Full name: Darrell Marquee Hill
- Born: August 17, 1993 (age 33) Darby, Pennsylvania, U.S.
- Height: 6 ft 3 in (191 cm)
- Weight: 320 lb (145 kg)

Sport
- Country: United States
- Sport: Athletics
- Event: Shot put

Achievements and titles
- Personal best: 22.44 m (73 ft 7 1/4 in)
Medal record
Men's athletics
Representing United States
Diamond League
| Winner | 2017 | Shot put |
NACAC Championships
| Gold medal – first place | 2018 Toronto | Shot Put |
NACAC U-23 Championships
| Silver medal – second place | 2014 British Columbia | Shot put |
- Updated on April 13, 2017

Darrell Marquee Hill (born August 17, 1993) is an American track and field athlete known for the shot put. On July 1, 2016, at the 2016 Olympic Trials, Hill threw a new personal best of 21.63 m (70 ft 11 1/2 in) to finish third and qualify for the 2016 Olympics. His previous personal best of 21.16m was set just two weeks earlier at the Olympic Training Center in Chula Vista, California.

Hill's father was able to watch his son in the Olympics after a crowdfunding campaign was started by a passenger whom he met while driving for Uber.

== Professional ==
Hill, sponsored by Nike, trained with USOC coach Art Venegas through 2017. From 2018, Hill was coached by Gregory Garza based at San Diego State University through April 2020. In April 2020, Hill moved to Phoenix, Arizona to be coached by Ryan Whiting with professional group Desert High Performance.

On July 1, 2016, at the 2016 Olympic Trials, Hill threw a new 2016 season-best of 21.63 m (70 ft 11 1/2 in) to finish third and qualify for the 2016 Olympics. His previous personal best of 21.16 m (69 ft 5 in) was set just two weeks earlier at the Olympic Training Center in Chula Vista, California.

Darrell placed 4th in 2017 opener in shot put at 2017 USA Indoor Track and Field Championships throwing 20.16 m (66 ft 2 in).

On September 1, 2017, Hill threw a personal best of 22.44 m (73 ft 7 1/4 in) at the 2017 Diamond League Brussels meet Memorial Van Damme. The throw moved him to #13 of all time.

Hill won the US Shot Put title at 2018 USA Outdoor Track and Field Championships.

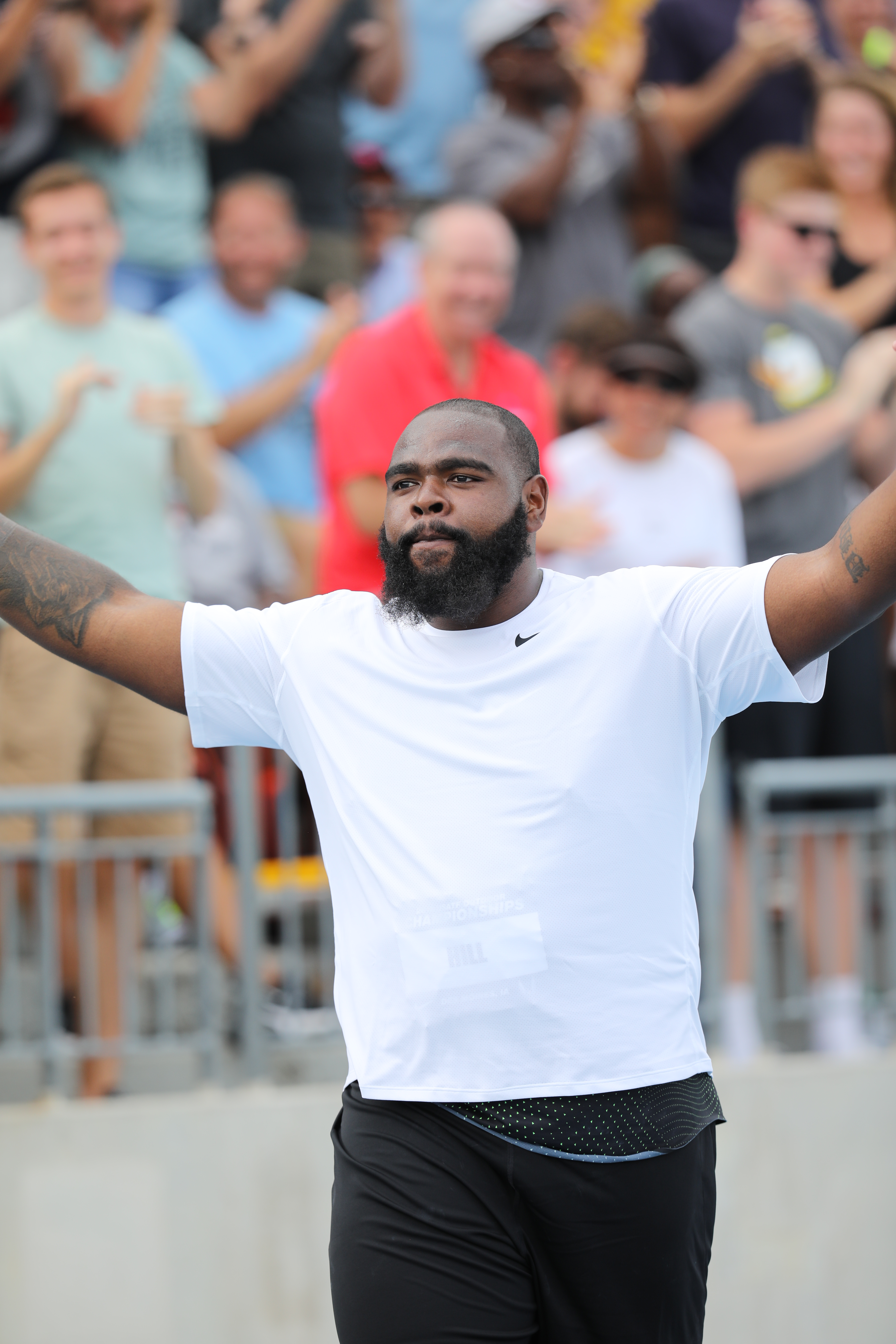
USATF day 3 2018 (42256915504)

representing United States
| 2019 World Championships in Athletics | Shot Put | 21.65 m (71 ft 1/4 in) | 5th |
| 2019 The Match Europe v USA | Shot Put | 22.35 m (73 ft 3 3/4 in) | 1st place, gold medalist(s) |
| 2019 Diamond League Final | Shot Put | 21.50 m (70 ft 6 1/4 in) | 2nd place, silver medalist(s) |
| 2018 Diamond League Final | Shot Put | 22.40 m (73 ft 5 3/4 in) | 2nd place, silver medalist(s) |
| 2018 Athletics World Cup | Shot Put | 21.43 m (70 ft 3 1/2 in) | 2nd place, silver medalist(s) |
| 2018 NACAC Championships | Shot Put | 21.68 m (71 ft 1 1/2 in) | 1st place, gold medalist(s) |
| 2018 IAAF World Indoor Championships | Shot Put | 21.06 m (69 ft 1 in) | 6th |
| 2017 Diamond League Final | Shot Put | 22.44 m (73 ft 7 1/4 in) | 1st place, gold medalist(s) |
| 2017 World Championships in Athletics | Shot Put | 20.79 m (68 ft 2 1/2 in) | 11th |
| 2016 IAAF World Challenge Final | Shot Put | 21.44 m (70 ft 4 in) | 3rd place, bronze medalist(s) |
| 2016 Diamond League Final | Shot Put | 20.33 m (66 ft 8 1/4 in) | 3rd place, bronze medalist(s) |
| 2016 Summer Olympics | Shot Put | 19.56 m (64 ft 2 in) | 23rd |
| 2015 Pan American Games | Shot Put | 20.10 m (65 ft 11 1/4 in) | 4th |
| 2015 NACAC Championships | Shot Put | 19.67 m (64 ft 6 1/4 in) | 2nd place, silver medalist(s) |
| 2014 NACAC Under-23 Championships in Athletics | Shot Put | 18.85 m (61 ft 10 in) | 2nd place, silver medalist(s) |
representing Nike
| 2019 USA Outdoor Track and Field Championships | Shot Put | 22.11 m (72 ft 6 1/4 in) | 3rd place, bronze medalist(s) |
| 2018 USA Outdoor Track and Field Championships | Shot Put | 21.57 m (70 ft 9 in) | 1st place, gold medalist(s) |
| 2018 USA Indoor Track and Field Championships | Shot Put | 20.02 m (65 ft 8 in) | 2nd place, silver medalist(s) |
| 2017 USA Outdoor Track and Field Championships | Shot Put | 20.60 m (67 ft 7 in) | 4th |
| 2016 United States Olympic Trials (track and field) | Shot Put | 21.63 m (70 ft 11 1/2 in) | 3rd place, bronze medalist(s) |
| 2015 USA Outdoor Track and Field Championships | Shot Put | 20.80 m (68 ft 2 3/4 in) | 6th |
| 2014 USA Outdoor Track and Field Championships | Shot Put | 19.54 m (64 ft 1 1/4 in) | 11th |
| 2012 U20 USA Outdoor Track and Field Championships | Shot Put | 18.62 m (61 ft 1 in) | 4th |

== NCAA ==
Hill competed for Penn State University, finishing second at the 2015 NCAA Division I Outdoor Track and Field Championships before graduating with a degree in Rehabilitation and Human Service. Earlier in that same year he finished fourth in the 2015 NCAA Division I Indoor Track and Field Championships.

Hill holds the Penn State school record indoors 20.51 m (67 ft 3 1/4 in). Olympic teammate Joe Kovacs holds the outdoor record 21.02 m (68 ft 11 1/2 in) just ahead of Hill's 20.86 m (68 ft 5 1/4 in).

Previously Hill competed for the University of Houston during his freshman year before transferring to Penn State University.

Hill placed 4th in the shot put at 2012 USA Junior Track and Field Championships at University of Indiana, Bloomington.

representing Penn State Nittany Lions
| 2015 NCAA Division I Outdoor Track and Field Championships | Shot Put | 20.78 m (68 ft 2 in) | 2nd place, silver medalist(s) |
| 2015 Big Ten Conference Outdoor track and field Championship | Shot Put | 20.20 m (66 ft 3 1/4 in) | 1st place, gold medalist(s) |
| 2015 NCAA Division I Indoor Track and Field Championships | Shot Put | 19.71 m (64 ft 7 3/4 in) | 4th |
| 2015 Big Ten Conference Indoor track and field Championship | Shot Put | 20.27 m (66 ft 6 in) | 1st place, gold medalist(s) |
| 2014 NCAA Division I Outdoor Track and Field Championships | Shot Put | 19.14 m (62 ft 9 1/2 in) | 15th |
| 2014 Big Ten Conference Outdoor track and field Championship | Shot Put | 20.57 m (67 ft 5 3/4 in) | 1st place, gold medalist(s) |
| 2014 Big Ten Conference Indoor track and field Championship | Shot Put | 18.08 m (59 ft 3 3/4 in) | 6th |
| 2013 Big Ten Conference Outdoor track and field Championship | Shot Put | 18.84 m (61 ft 9 1/2 in) | 3rd place, bronze medalist(s) |
| 2013 Big Ten Conference Indoor track and field Championship | Shot Put | 18.15 m (59 ft 6 1/2 in) | 7th |
representing University of Houston Cougars
| 2012 Conference USA Outdoor Championships | Shot Put | 16.87 m (55 ft 4 in) | 4th |
| 2012 Conference USA Indoor Championships | Shot Put | 17.02 m (55 ft 10 in) | 6th |

== Prep ==
Born in Darby, Pennsylvania, Hill finished in second place at the 2011 PIAA Track and Field Championships in the shot put. In high school, Hill competed for Penn Wood High School in Lansdowne, Pennsylvania.

Hill grew up playing high school football, high school basketball, high school wrestling, and throwing shot put and discus (starting 2009).

New Balance Indoor Nationals
| 2011 | Shot Put | 18.49 m (60 ft 7 3/4 in); 7th place |
Representing Penn Wood High School at Pennsylvania Interscholastic Athletic Association state track and field championship
| Year | Season Best | Shot Put state performance |
| 2011 | 18.49 m (60 ft 7 3/4 in) | 2nd place 17.22 m (56 ft 5 3/4 in) |
| 2010 | 16.28 m (53 ft 4 3/4 in) | 8th place 15.445 m (50 ft 8 in) |
| 2009 | 13.185 m (43 ft 3 in) | DNQ |

== See also ==
- List of Pennsylvania State University Olympians
