= 2018 IAAF World Indoor Championships – Men's shot put =

Men's shot put at the 2018 IAAF World Indoor Championships
- Venue: Arena Birmingham
- Dates: 3 March
- Competitors: 16 from 14 nations
- Winning distance: 22.31 CR

Medalists
gold medal	Tomas Walsh	New Zealand
silver medal	David Storl	Germany
bronze medal	Tomáš Staněk	Czech Republic

The men's shot put at the 2018 IAAF World Indoor Championships took place on 3 March 2018.

== Summary ==
Thomas Walsh came in as the defending champion. Five throws into the competition, he threw 22.13 m (72 ft 7 1/4 in) to improve upon his own Oceanian record set while winning the previous championships. Nobody would beat that mark in the competition, except Walsh himself, first equalling it in the third round then throwing 22.31 m (73 ft 2 1/4 in) as the final attempt of the day. Indoor marks now being acceptable, that mark moved him to the number 15# performer in the shot put of all time, displacing Ryan Whiting who was in the competition.

The race for the other medals was much more competitive. On their first attempts, Whiting threw 20.96m, Darrell Hill threw 21.06m, David Storl threw 21.14m and Darlan Romani threw 21.23m. Romani and Storl held those positions until the fourth round when, Tomáš Staněk threw 21.44m to move into silver position. Two throws later, Storl matched that mark exactly. With a superior 2nd (and 3rd) best throw, Storl held the tiebreaker. In the final round, Romani couldn't get back on the podium with his 21.37m, a new South American indoor record, then Storl improved on his tie breaking position again.

== Results ==
The final was started at 11:57.

Rank	Athlete	Nationality	#1	#2	#3	#4	#5	#6	Result	Notes
1st place, gold medalist(s)	Tomas Walsh	New Zealand	22.13	x	22.13	x	x	22.31	22.31	CR, AR
2nd place, silver medalist(s)	David Storl	Germany	21.14	21.15	21.08	21.44	x	21.18	21.44	SB
3rd place, bronze medalist(s)	Tomáš Staněk	Czech Republic	20.28	21.12	x	21.44	x	20.27	21.44	
4	Darlan Romani	Brazil	21.23	x	21.09	20.97	21.04	21.37	21.37	AR
5	Mesud Pezer	Bosnia and Herzegovina	20.36	20.31	21.15	20.58	20.73		21.15	NR
6	Darrell Hill	United States	21.06	x	20.79	x	x		21.06	PB
7	Ryan Whiting	United States	20.96	x	20.28	20.45	21.03		21.03	SB
8	Konrad Bukowiecki	Poland	18.35	20.99	20.15	x	x		20.99	
9	Tim Nedow	Canada	20.09	20.82	20.69				20.82	SB
10	Michał Haratyk	Poland	19.89	19.89	20.69				20.69	
11	O'Dayne Richards	Jamaica	19.93	19.72	19.90				19.93	PB
12	Tsanko Arnaudov	Portugal	x	19.93	x				19.93	
13	Maksim Afonin	Authorised Neutral Athletes	19.84	x	x				19.84	
14	Chukwuebuka Enekwechi	Nigeria	18.62	19.78	x				19.78	
15	Asmir Kolašinac	Serbia	19.29	x	19.34				19.34	
16	Damien Birkinhead	Australia	19.10	19.11	x				19.11	
