= Athletics at the 2014 Commonwealth Games – Men's shot put =

Sports competition

Men's shot put at the Commonwealth Games

The Men's shot put at the 2014 Commonwealth Games as part of the athletics programme took place at Hampden Park on 27 and 28 July 2014.

== Results ==
=== Qualifying round ===
Final qualification mark was set at 20.00 metres, and athletes reaching that marked qualified for the final. Where less than twelve made the mark, the first twelve athletes were to qualify for the final as of right. In the event, three athletes qualified through reaching the mark; the next nine qualified for the final without reaching the mark.

New Zealand's Tomas Walsh was the best mark from the first round, at 21.24 metres, a new Commonwealth Games record

Rank	Group	Name	#1	#2	#3	Result	Notes
1	A	Tomas Walsh (NZL)	21.24			21.24	Q GR
2	B	O'Dayne Richards (JAM)	20.24			20.24	Q
3	B	Orazio Cremona (RSA)	18.69	19.79	20.03	20.03	Q
4	B	Tim Nedow (CAN)	17.92	19.33	19.84	19.84	q
5	B	Jacko Gill (NZL)	19.54	x	x	19.54	q
6	A	Damien Birkinhead (AUS)	19.04	19.20	18.31	19.20	q
7	A	Justin Rodhe (CAN)	x	19.14	x	19.14	q
8	B	Om Prakash Singh Karhana (IND)	17.67	18.54	18.98	18.98	q
9	A	Zane Duquemin (JER)	17.40	18.32	18.90	18.90	q
10	A	Scott Rider (ENG)	18.33	18.40	17.82	18.40	q
11	B	Dillon Simon (DMA)	18.11	18.40	17.99	18.40	q
12	A	Raymond Brown (JAM)	x	15.89	18.11	18.11	q
13	B	Robert Collingwood (TRI)	16.78	17.41	17.83	17.83	
14	A	Stephen Mozia (NGR)	17.57	x	17.76	17.76	
15	A	Gareth Winter (WAL)	17.33	16.44	17.16	17.33	
16	A	Eldred Henry (IVB)	16.93	x	17.08	17.08	
17	B	Ryan Jones (WAL)	16.27	x	16.78	16.78	
18	B	Sylvain Pierre Louis (MRI)	15.23	x	x	15.23	
19	B	Dean William (SEY)	12.89	12.21	11.81	12.89	
20	A	Raobu Tarawa (KIR)	x	12.08	11.25	12.08	

=== Final ===
Rank	Name	#1	#2	#3	#4	#5	#6	Result	Notes
1st place, gold medalist(s)	O'Dayne Richards (JAM)	20.94	20.83	20.70	21.61	x	20.20	21.61	GR
2nd place, silver medalist(s)	Tomas Walsh (NZL)	20.73	20.96	20.90	21.19	20.84	x	21.19	
3rd place, bronze medalist(s)	Tim Nedow (CAN)	19.62	19.59	x	20.59	20.24	20.01	20.59	
4	Orazio Cremona (RSA)	19.19	19.80	20.13	19.73	19.84	x	20.13	
5	Damien Birkinhead (AUS)	19.12	18.23	19.59	x	x	18.84	19.59	
6	Om Prakash Singh Karhana (IND)	18.44	18.73	17.08	18.26	16.95	18.33	18.73	
7	Dillon Simon (DMA)	x	x	18.66	x	17.84	x	18.66	
8	Raymond Brown (JAM)	18.38	18.58	18.65	x	18.40	18.63	18.65	
9	Zane Duquemin (JER)	18.16	x	17.65				18.16	
10	Scott Rider (ENG)	18.06	x	18.12				18.12	
11	Jacko Gill (NZL)	x	16.70	18.05				18.05	
	Justin Rodhe (CAN)	x	x	x				NM	
