= 2016 IAAF World Indoor Championships – Men's shot put =

Men's shot put

Men's shot put at the 2016 IAAF World Indoor Championships
- Venue: Oregon Convention Center
- Dates: March 18
- Competitors: 19 from 15 nations
- Winning distance: 21.78

Medalists
gold medal	Tomas Walsh	New Zealand
silver medal	Andrei Gag	Romania
bronze medal	Filip Mihaljevic	Croatia

The men's shot put at the 2016 IAAF World Indoor Championships took place on March 18, 2016.

While Andrei Gag and Filip Mihaljevic were the leaders after the first round, in the second round Tomas Walsh took the lead. Any one of his remaining five throws would have won the competition, with a best of 21.78 on his final attempt. Gag finished second with his first round attempt of 20.89, while Mihaljevic's personal best 20.87 in round 5 saw him finish third.

== Results ==
The final was started at 18.45.

Rank	Name	Nationality	#1	#2	#3	#4	#5	#6	Result	Notes
1st place, gold medalist(s)	Tomas Walsh	New Zealand	20.38	21.60	21.40	21.64	21.49	21.78	21.78	WL
2nd place, silver medalist(s)	Andrei Gag	Romania	20.89	20.08	x	x	20.23	x	20.89	SB
3rd place, bronze medalist(s)	Filip Mihaljević	Croatia	20.64	20.06	20.42	20.49	20.87	x	20.87	PB
4	Konrad Bukowiecki	Poland	x	20.53	x	20.43	x	20.42	20.53	
5	Jonathan Jones	United States	18.88	20.01	x	20.31	x		20.31	
6	Germán Lauro	Argentina	19.92	19.85	20.21	x	20.24		20.24	
7	Tim Nedow	Canada	19.52	20.23	19.95	20.03	19.60		20.23	
8	Tobias Dahm	Germany	19.40	20.22	x	19.42	19.06		20.22	
9	Jacko Gill	New Zealand	19.49	x	19.93				19.93	
10	Carlos Tobalina	Spain	19.41	19.86	x				19.86	
11	Borja Vivas	Spain	19.63	19.85	19.75				19.85	
12	Stephen Mozia	Nigeria	19.84	x	x				19.84	
13	Mostafa Amr Hassan	Egypt	19.81	x	19.39				19.81	
14	Michał Haratyk	Poland	18.90	19.48	19.35				19.48	
15	Bob Bertemes	Luxembourg	18.63	19.48	x				19.48	SB
16	Tomáš Staněk	Czech Republic	x	19.46	x				19.46	
17	Franck Elemba	Republic of the Congo	x	19.24	19.34				19.34	
18	Darlan Romani	Brazil	18.50	x	x				18.50	NR
19	Kurt Roberts	United States	x	x	17.94				17.94	
