= Kurt Roberts =

American shot putter (born 1988)

Personal information
- Born: Kurt Roberts; January 20, 1988 (age 38)

Kurt Roberts (born February 20, 1988) is an American track and field athlete who competes in the shot put. He set his personal record for the event in 2014, throwing 21.50 m (70 ft 6 1/4 in) to take second at the USA Indoor Track and Field Championships.

He was a late starter in the sport and competed in NCAA Division II competition with Ashland University. He won once at the NCAA Men's Division II Outdoor Track and Field Championships and two titles at the NCAA DII Indoor Championships. His performance of 19.80 m (64 ft 11 1/2 in) in 2010 is the best by any NCAA Division II athlete. He was the gold medallist at the 2010 NACAC Under-23 Championships in Athletics.

== Biography ==
=== Early life and college ===
Born in Lancaster, Ohio, he attended Athens High School and began to compete in the shot put around the age of sixteen. He progressively became more serious about the sport as he got older. He attended Ashland University and competed for the Ashland Eagles in NCAA Division II. In his first year, he was runner-up indoors and out in the Great Lakes Intercollegiate Athletic Conference (GLIAC) and managed third place at the NCAA Men's Division II Outdoor Track and Field Championships with a throw of 17.81 m (58 ft 5 in). He improved further the following year to win both GLIAC titles as well as the NCAA DII outdoor title, setting a personal record and seasonal division best of 18.78 m (61 ft 7 1/4 in).

Roberts achieved the best mark ever for an NCAA Division II athlete when he won the NCAA DII Indoor title with a put of 19.80 m (64 ft 11 1/2 in) – a mark which ranked him second among American collegians that season. He was only third at the NCAA outdoor meet. He made his national debut at the 2010 USA Outdoor Track and Field Championships, taking 15th place. He also made his international debut and won a gold medal at the 2010 NACAC Under-23 Championships in Athletics. He retained his NCAA indoor title the following year, but failed to record a valid mark at the outdoor meet. He threw over twenty metres for the first time at the beginning of 2011 and his mark of 20.30 m (66 ft 7 in) ranked him in the top ten nationally that year.

=== Professional ===
Roberts began to shot put professionally in 2012. He competed at the USA Indoor Track and Field Championships and placed eighth. Outdoors he rapidly improved, throwing 20.33 m (66 ft 8 1/4 in) and then 21.14 m (69 ft 4 1/4 in) (the latter performance placed him tenth in the world in the event that year). His put of 20.75 m (68 ft 3/4 in) at the 2012 United States Olympic Trials did not bring him a place on the American Olympic team, but his ranking of fifth overall marked him out as one of the best throwers in the country. At those trials a photograph of him competing, taken mid-throw by Matt Slocum for the Associated Press, gained widespread coverage due to his unusually distorted face and gruff features. This raised the profile of the athlete, who was still supporting himself by working as a physical education teacher at an elementary school in Ohio.

Still without sponsor, he took third place at the 2013 USA Indoor Championships, throwing 20.89 m (68 ft 6 1/4 in) to place behind Ryan Whiting and Cory Martin. Outdoors, he won at the Mt. SAC Relays meet and had a season's best of 20.98 m (68 ft 9 3/4 in) in May. He peaked too early, as he failed to record a mark at the 2013 USA Outdoor Track and Field Championships. Roberts improved his personal record in February at the 2014 USA Indoor Championships – he took the lead with a large throw of 21.50 m (70 ft 6 1/4 in), but was then beaten into second place by Whiting, who set a lifetime best himself. This ranked Roberts second in the world at the point he was chosen to represent his country at the 2014 IAAF World Indoor Championships.

== Personal records ==
- Shot put (outdoors) – 21.14 m (69 ft 4 1/4 in) (2012)
- Shot put (outdoors) – 21.50 m (70 ft 6 1/4 in) (2014)
- Weight throw (indoors) – 18.59 m (60 ft 11 3/4 in) (2009)

== International competitions ==
Year	Competition	Venue	Position	Notes
2010	NACAC Under-23 Championships	Miramar, Florida, United States	1st	18.60 m (61 ft 1/4 in)
2014	World Indoor Championships	Sopot, Poland	10th (q)	20.17 m
2016	World Indoor Championships	Portland, United States	19th	17.94 m
