= Darlan Romani =

Brazilian shot putter (born 1991)

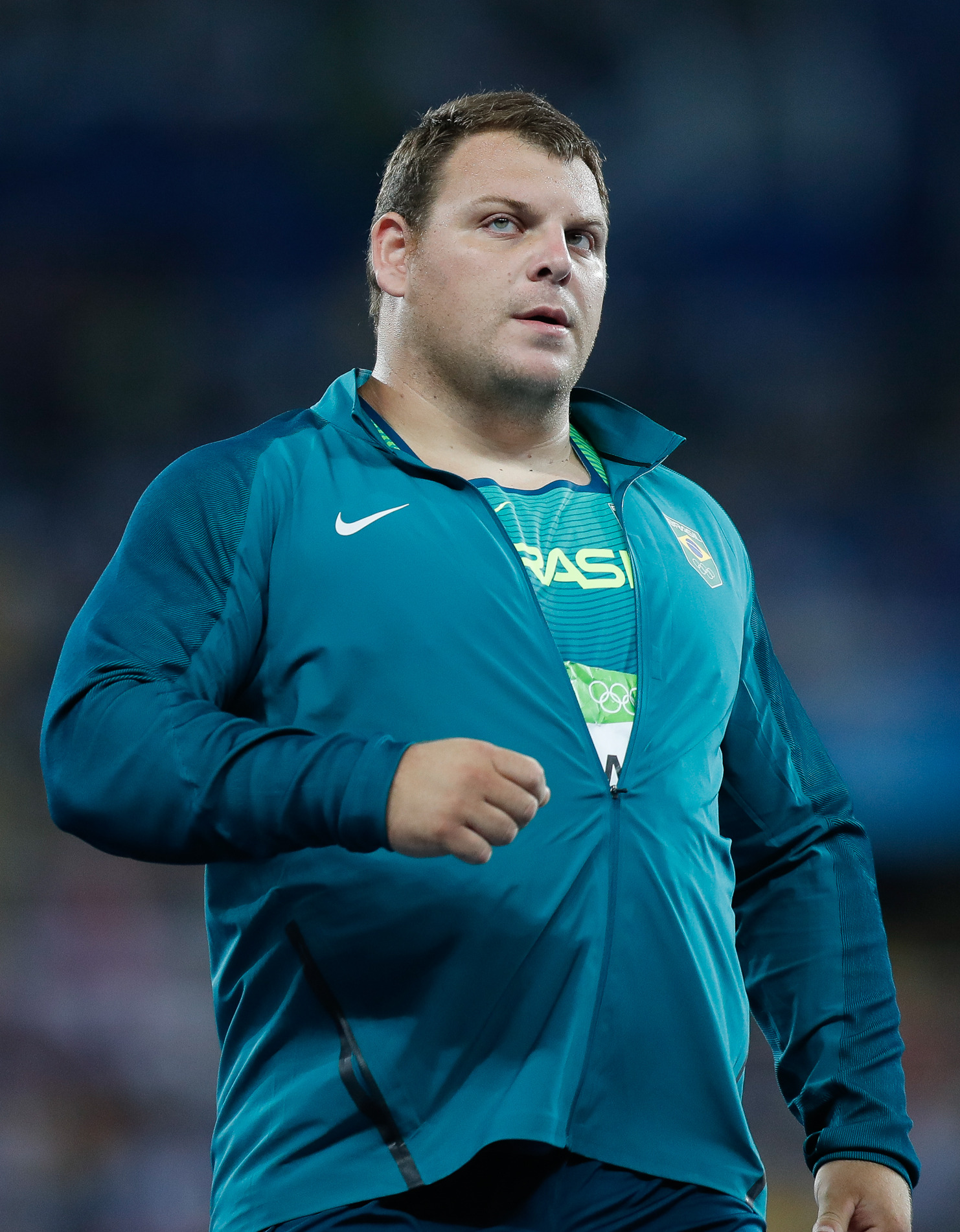
- Romani at the 2016 Summer Olympics

Personal information
- Nicknames: Sr. Incrivel; English: Mr. Incredible
- Born: 9 April 1991 (age 35) Concórdia, Santa Catarina, Brazil
- Height: 1.88 m (6 ft 2 in)
- Weight: 140 kg (309 lb)

Sport
- Sport: Track and field
- Event: Shot put
Medal record
Men's athletics
Representing Brazil
World Indoor Championships
Gold medal – first place	2022 Belgrade	Shot put
Pan American Games
Gold medal – first place	2019 Lima	Shot put
Gold medal – first place	2023 Santiago	Shot put
Military World Games
Gold medal – first place	2015 Mungyeong	Shot put
Gold medal – first place	2019 Wuhan	Shot put
South American Games
Gold medal – first place	2018 Cochabamba	Shot put
Silver medal – second place	2014 Santiago	Shot put
South American Championships
Gold medal – first place	2017 Asunción	Shot put
Gold medal – first place	2019 Lima	Shot put
Silver medal – second place	2013 Cartagena	Shot put
Silver medal – second place	2015 Lima	Shot put
Ibero-American Championships
Gold medal – first place	2016 Rio de Janeiro	Shot put
Silver medal – second place	2014 São Paulo	Shot put
Bronze medal – third place	2012 Barquisimeto	Shot put
Representing Americas
Continental Cup
Gold medal – first place	2018 Ostrava	Shot put
- Updated on 19 March 2022

Darlan Romani (born 9 April 1991) is a Brazilian track and field athlete specialising in the shot put. He was the Indoor World Champion in 2022, finished 4th at the 2020 Olympic Games, 4th at the 2019 World Championships, and was champion of the 2019 and 2023 Pan American Games.

== Professional athletics career ==
Romani has held the Brazilian shot put record since 2012. He surpassed the mark again in early 2015 when he reached 20.90m.

At the 2016 Summer Olympics, in the Men's shot put, he broke the Brazilian record twice (20.94 metres in the qualifying round and 21.02 metres in the final), finishing 5th. It was the best participation of a Brazilian in the event.

In March 2018, he finished 4th place in the Indoor World Championship, with a 21.37 mark, a new indoor South American record.

In early September 2018, representing the Americas in the IAAF Continental Cup, Darlan won gold with a 21.89 weight-shot, defeating 2017 World Champion Tom Walsh.

On 15 September 2018, he became the first South American to reach the mark of 22 m. In the Brazil Trophy, he got the exact mark of 22.00, again breaking the South American record. Fewer than 30 athletes have achieved this mark throughout the history of the event.

At the end of 2018, he won the trophy for Best Athlete in Athletics at the Brazil Olympic Award.

In June 2019, at the Eugene stage of the Diamond League, he obtained the 10th-best mark (by athlete) in History in the Shot Put, 22.61. He broke the South American record three times in the same event (22.46, 22.55, and 22.61).

At the 2019 Pan American Games held in Lima, Peru, even though he had a throat infection that left him with a severe fever the day before the race, Romani won the gold medal, beating the Pan American Games record with the mark of 22.07 m.

At the 2019 World Athletics Championships held in Doha, Qatar, the greatest and strongest competition of all time in the Shot Put was held. Tom Walsh threw 22.90m on the first try. Romani threw 22.53m on his second attempt, which put him in second place at that moment. American Ryan Crouser threw 22.71m on his fourth attempt, putting Romani back in 3rd place. On their last puts, the American Joe Kovacs threw 22.91m, and Crouser got 22.90m, both finishing with gold and silver, with Walsh finishing with the bronze. Romani finished in 4th place, the only one who put over 22 m, along with the three medalists. It was the best result for Brazil in the World Championships in this competition. Since 1990 no one had thrown a weight over 22.80m, and the top four places in this competition (including Romani) broke the World Championship record of 22.23m.

In the Diamond League 2019, he finished as runner-up overall.

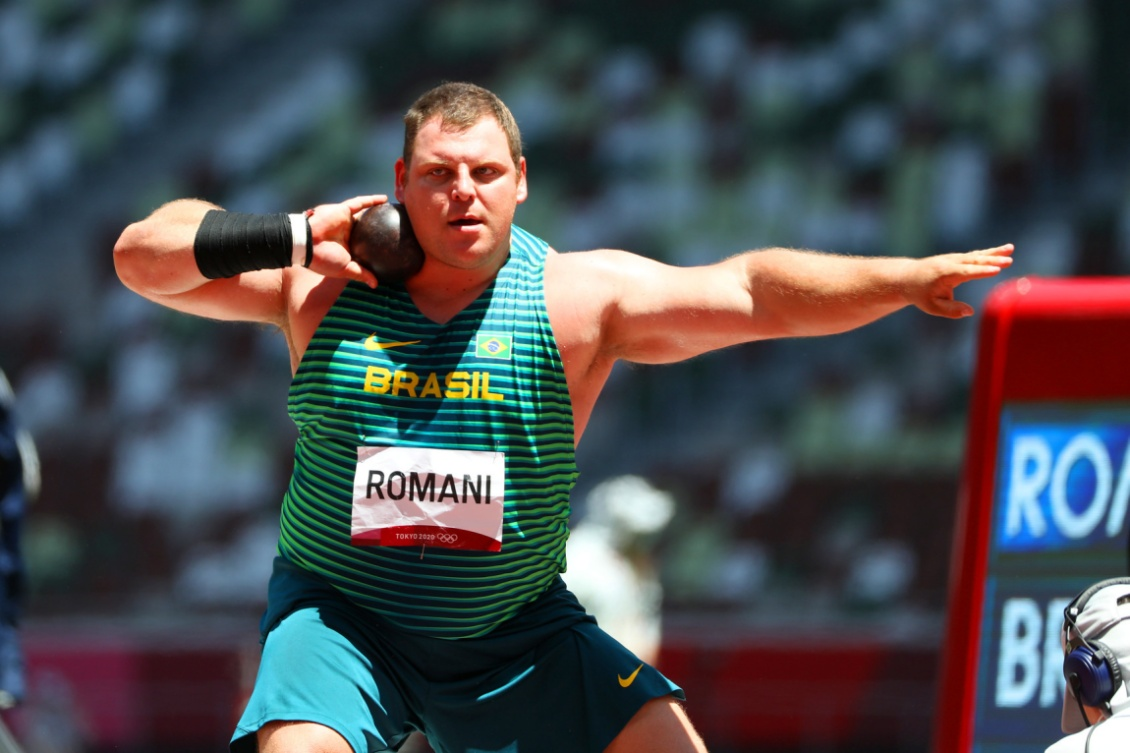
Romani at Tokyo 2020.

Romani had several complications with training in 2020 and 2021: he and his family contracted COVID. Romani lost 10 kg in 14 days. Because his training centre was closed in 2020, he had to improvise on the ground next to his house. Without proper training equipment, in early 2021, pain from a herniated disc forced him to take a break for 45 days of rehabilitation. He also had problems with not being able to train with his coach for several months. Romani overcame these adversities and qualified for the Olympics. Taking part in the 2020 Olympic Games in Tokyo, Romani calmly qualified for the final with a mark of 21.31. In the final, Romani had a good first shot of 21.88, but, not being in his best form due to problems in the period before the Games, he couldn't get a shot over 22 meters in the later shots, finishing in 4th place. The bronze medal went to Tom Walsh with 22.47. The 4th position, however, is the best in the history of Brazil in this event in the Olympic Games.

On 19 March 2022, Romani became World Champion, defeating Ryan Crouser, world record holder and Olympic champion of the event, who had not lost a competition in the last three years. Romani surpassed his South American indoor record of 21.71, which had been set a month earlier. He achieved the mark of 22.53, beating the record of the World Athletics Indoor Championships.

At the 2022 World Athletics Championships, Romani was unable to throw over 22m in the final, finishing 5th, with a mark of 21.92.

At the 2023 World Athletics Championships, Romani qualified in 1st place with a mark of 22.37m. However, in the final, he finished 8th with a mark of 21.41m.

At the 2023 Pan American Games, Romani became two-time champion of the event, winning gold with a mark of 21.36 m.

A few days before participating in the 2024 Olympic Games, Romani had to withdraw from the competition after a medical evaluation detected a herniated disc in the shot putter, who would have to undergo surgery.

== Competition record ==
Year	Competition	Venue	Position	Event	Result
Representing Brazil
2008	South American Youth Championships	Lima, Peru	2nd	Shot put (5 kg)	17.06 m
2009	South American Junior Championships	São Paulo, Brazil	2nd	Shot put (6 kg)	16.99 m
2010	World Junior Championships	Moncton, Canada	7th	Shot put (6 kg)	18.58 m
2012	Ibero-American Championships	Barquisimeto, Venezuela	3rd	Shot put	18.93 m
2012	South American U23 Championships	São Paulo, Brazil	1st	Shot put	19.93 m
2013	South American Championships	Cartagena, Colombia	2nd	Shot put	19.64 m
2014	South American Games	Santiago, Chile	2nd	Shot put	19.96 m
2014	Ibero-American Championships	São Paulo, Brazil	2nd	Shot put	19.64 m
2014	Pan American Sports Festival	Mexico City, Mexico	2nd	Shot put	20.03 m A
2015	South American Championships	Lima, Peru	2nd	Shot put	20.32 m
2015	Pan American Games	Toronto, Canada	6th	Shot put	19.74 m
2015	World Championships	Beijing, China	15th (q)	Shot put	19.86 m
2015	Military World Games	Mungyeong, South Korea	1st	Shot put	20.08 m
2016	World Indoor Championships	Portland, United States	18th	Shot put	18.50 m (NR)
2016	Ibero-American Championships	Rio de Janeiro, Brazil	1st	Shot put	19.67 m
2016	Olympic Games	Rio de Janeiro, Brazil	5th	Shot put	21.02 m (NR)
2017	South American Championships	Asunción, Paraguay	1st	Shot put	21.02 m
2017	World Championships	London, United Kingdom	15th (q)	Shot put	20.21 m
2018	World Indoor Championships	Birmingham, United Kingdom	4th	Shot put	21.37 m
2018	South American Games	Cochabamba, Bolivia	1st	Shot put	21.21 m
2018	Ibero-American Championships	Trujillo, Peru	1st	Shot put	20.74 m
2018	Continental Cup	Ostrava, Czech Republic	1st	Shot put	21.89 m
2019	South American Championships	Lima, Peru	1st	Shot put	21.00 m
2019	Pan American Games	Lima, Peru	1st	Shot put	22.07 m
2019	World Championships	Doha, Qatar	4th	Shot put	22.53 m
2019	Military World Games	Wuhan, China	1st	Shot put	22.36 m
2021	Olympic Games	Tokyo, Japan	4th	Shot put	21.88 m
2022	South American Indoor Championships	Cochabamba, Bolivia	1st	Shot put	21.71 m
2022	World Indoor Championships	Belgrade, Serbia	1st	Shot put	22.53 m
2022	Ibero-American Championships	La Nucía, Spain	1st	Shot put	21.70 m
2022	World Championships	Eugene, United States	5th	Shot put	21.92 m
2023	World Championships	Budapest, Hungary	8th	Shot put	21.41 m
2023	Pan American Games	Santiago, Chile	1st	Shot put	21.36 m
2024	South American Indoor Championships	Cochabamba, Bolivia	1st	Shot put	21.10 m
2024	World Indoor Championships	Glasgow, United Kingdom	7th	Shot put	21.11 m
2024	Ibero-American Championships	Cuiabá, Brazil	2nd	Shot put	20.53 m

== Personal bests ==
- Shot put (outdoor): 22.61 m – Palo Alto, United States, 30 June 2019
- Shot put (indoor): 22.53 m – Belgrade, Serbia, 19 March 2022

== Season's best ==
- 2012 – 20.48
- 2013 – 20.08
- 2014 – 20.84
- 2015 – 20.90
- 2016 – 21.02
- 2017 – 21.82
- 2018 – 22.00
- 2019 – 22.61
- 2020 – 21.52
- 2021 – 21.88
- 2022 – 22.53
- 2023 – 22.37
- 2024 – 21.52
