= 2010 World Junior Championships in Athletics – Men's shot put =

The men's shot put event at the 2010 World Junior Championships in Athletics was held in Moncton, New Brunswick, Canada, at Moncton Stadium on 21 July. A 6 kg (junior implement) shot was used.

== Medalists ==
Gold	Jacko Gill; New Zealand
Silver	Božidar Antunović; Serbia
Bronze	Ding Yongheng; China

== Results ==
=== Final ===
21 July

Rank	Name	Nationality	Attempts						Result	Notes
Rank	Name	Nationality	1	2	3	4	5	6	Result	Notes
1st place, gold medalist(s)	Jacko Gill	New Zealand	20.24	20.76	19.54	x	19.45	x	20.76	
2nd place, silver medalist(s)	Božidar Antunović	Serbia	19.90	19.87	19.64	20.20	20.16	20.10	20.20	
3rd place, bronze medalist(s)	Ding Yongheng	China	19.69	20.14	x	x	19.67	x	20.14	
4	Nicholas Vena	United States	19.05	19.54	x	19.05	x	19.72	19.72	
5	Li Meng	China	18.65	18.66	19.17	18.95	18.91	x	19.17	
6	Lukas Weisshaidinger	Austria	x	18.68	x	18.62	19.03	18.95	19.03	
7	Darlan Romani	Brazil	18.58	18.45	17.64	17.99	x	18.49	18.58	
8	Frédéric Dagée	France	18.26	18.49	18.41	18.09	x	x	18.49	
9	Marcel Bosler	Germany	15.19	x	18.45				18.45	
10	Maksim Zakharenka	Belarus	18.44	18.19	18.42				18.44	
	Hayden Baillio	United States	x	x	x				NM	
	Jacek Wiśniewski	Poland	x	17.95	17.69				DQ	IAAF rule 32.2

=== Qualifications ===
21 July

==== Group A ====
Rank	Name	Nationality	Attempts			Result	Notes
Rank	Name	Nationality	1	2	3	Result	Notes
1	Nicholas Vena	United States	19.90	-	-	19.90	Q
2	Li Meng	China	19.36	-	-	19.36	Q
3	Jacko Gill	New Zealand	x	x	19.28	19.28	Q
4	Darlan Romani	Brazil	17.41	18.65	18.98	18.98	q
5	Frédéric Dagée	France	18.30	18.87	17.89	18.87	q
6	Marcel Bosler	Germany	17.94	x	18.87	18.87	q
7	Tommaso Parolo	Italy	x	16.83	17.60	17.60	
8	Ashinia Miller	Jamaica	16.20	16.26	17.44	17.44	
9	Andrew Welch	Canada	15.72	17.30	x	17.30	
10	Matthew Cowie	Australia	17.08	17.16	17.27	17.27	
11	Maksim Afonin	Russia	17.09	16.80	x	17.09	
12	Luka Mustafic	Croatia	x	16.72	16.82	16.82	
	Martin Novák	Czech Republic	x	x	x	NM	
	Arwid Koskinen	Sweden	x	x	x	NM	
	Jacek Wiśniewski	Poland	17.97	18.66	19.09	DQ	IAAF rule 32.2 q

==== Group B ====
Rank	Name	Nationality	Attempts			Result	Notes
Rank	Name	Nationality	1	2	3	Result	Notes
1	Ding Yongheng	China	20.10	-	-	20.10	Q
2	Božidar Antunović	Serbia	19.43	-	-	19.43	Q
3	Hayden Baillio	United States	x	19.40	-	19.40	Q
4	Lukas Weisshaidinger	Austria	18.93	x	x	18.93	q
5	Maksim Zakharenka	Belarus	18.76	18.90	18.25	18.90	q
6	Jakub Szyszkowski	Poland	x	18.74	18.32	18.74	
7	Chad Wright	Jamaica	17.69	17.76	18.33	18.33	
8	Daniele Secci	Italy	18.25	17.69	18.03	18.25	
9	Francisco Belo	Portugal	16.45	18.16	x	18.16	
10	Tomas Walsh	New Zealand	17.92	16.85	17.63	17.92	
11	Ben Getemans	Bulgaria	17.01	17.73	x	17.73	
12	Vitali Kuzmintshuk	Israel	17.14	17.20	17.06	17.20	
13	Apostolos Tsakkistos	Cyprus	15.98	x	16.94	16.94	
14	Jorge García	Mexico	16.51	x	16.18	16.51	
15	Daniel Ståhl	Sweden	x	x	16.36	16.36	

== Participation ==
According to an unofficial count, 30 athletes from 23 countries participated in the event.

- Australia (1)
- Austria (1)
- Belarus (1)
- Brazil (1)
- Bulgaria (1)
- Canada (1)
- China (2)
- Croatia (1)
- Cyprus (1)
- Czech Republic (1)
- France (1)
- Germany (1)
- Israel (1)
- Italy (2)
- Jamaica (2)
- Mexico (1)
- New Zealand (2)
- Poland (2)
- Portugal (1)
- Russia (1)
- Serbia (1)
- Sweden (2)
- United States (2)
