= Athletics at the 2023 Pan American Games – Men's shot put =

Men's shot put at the 2023 Pan American Games
- Venue: Julio Martínez National Stadium
- Dates: November 3
- Competitors: 13 from 9 nations
- Winning distance: 21.36

Medalists
Gold medal	Darlan Romani	Brazil
Silver medal	Uziel Muñoz	Mexico
Bronze medal	Jordan Geist	United States

The men's shot put competition of the athletics events at the 2023 Pan American Games took place on November 3 at the Julio Martínez National Stadium.

== Records ==
Prior to this competition, the existing world and Pan American Games records were as follows:

World record	Ryan Crouser (USA)	23.37 m	Eugene, United States	June 18, 2021
Pan American Games record	Darlan Romani (BRA)	22.07 m	Lima, Peru	August 7, 2019

== Schedule ==
Date	Time	Round
November 3, 2023	17:27	Final

== Results ==
All marks shown are in meters.

KEY:	q	Fastest non-qualifiers	Q	Qualified	NR	National record	PB	Personal best	SB	Seasonal best	DQ	Disqualified

=== Final ===
The results were as follows:

Rank	Name	Nationality	#1	#2	#3	#4	#5	#6	Mark	Notes
1st place, gold medalist(s)	Darlan Romani	Brazil	x	20.33	20.86	20.98	21.36	21.02	21.36	
2nd place, silver medalist(s)	Uziel Muñoz	Mexico	20.33	20.60	21.15	20.91	x	20.48	21.15	
3rd place, bronze medalist(s)	Jordan Geist	United States	20.17	20.02	20.30	20.53	19.98	20.34	20.53	
4	Roger Steen	United States	20.47	19.95	20.51	20.35	x	20.19	20.51	
5	Welington Morais	Brazil	19.53	20.26	19.83	x	19.68	19.88	20.26	
6	Nazareno Sasia	Argentina	18.97	19.67	19.66	x	19.61	19.69	19.69	
7	Ignacio Carballo	Argentina	19.24	18.85	18.74	18.52	x	19.62	19.62	
8	Rajindra Campbell	Jamaica	19.27	x	x	x	x	x	19.27	
9	O'Dayne Richards	Jamaica	18.30	18.37	x				18.37	
10	Zachary Short	Honduras	17.81	x	x				17.81	
11	Eldred Henry	British Virgin Islands	x	16.98	x				16.98	
12	Matías Puschel	Chile	16.20	x	16.07				16.20	
	Djimon Gumbs	British Virgin Islands	x	x	x				NM	
