= Athletics at the 2018 Commonwealth Games – Men's shot put =

Men's shot put at the 2018 Commonwealth Games
- Venue: Carrara Stadium
- Dates: 8 April (qualifying round); 9 April (final)
- Competitors: 16 from 13 nations
- Winning distance: 21.41 m

Medalists
gold medal	Tomas Walsh	New Zealand
silver medal	Chukwuebuka Enekwechi	Nigeria
bronze medal	Tim Nedow	Canada

The men's shot put at the 2018 Commonwealth Games, as part of the athletics programme, took place in the Carrara Stadium on 8 and 9 April 2018.

== Records ==
Prior to this competition, the existing world and Games records were as follows:

World record	Randy Barnes (USA)	23.12 m	Los Angeles, United States	20 May 1990
Games record	O'Dayne Richards (JAM)	21.61 m	Glasgow, Scotland	28 July 2014

== Schedule ==
The schedule was as follows:

Date	Time	Round
Sunday 8 April 2018	16:35	Qualification
Monday 9 April 2018	20:25	Final

All times are Australian Eastern Standard Time (UTC+10)

== Results ==
=== Qualifying round ===
Across two groups, those who threw ≥19.00 m (Q) or at least the 12 best performers (q) advanced to the final.

Rank	Group	Athlete	#1	#2	#3	Result	Notes	Qual.
1	A	Tomas Walsh (NZL)	22.45			22.45	GR	Q
2	A	Chukwuebuka Enekwechi (NGR)	20.66			20.66		Q
3	B	Damien Birkinhead (AUS)	20.47			20.47		Q
4	B	O'Dayne Richards (JAM)	18.90	19.65		19.65		Q
5	A	Dillon Simon (DMA)	18.29	19.44		19.44	SB	Q
6	A	Ashinia Miller (JAM)	18.87	19.35		19.35		Q
7	A	Orazio Cremona (RSA)	19.24			19.24		Q
8	B	Tim Nedow (CAN)	19.21			19.21		Q
9	B	Akeem Stewart (TTO)	18.93	19.12		19.12	SB	Q
10	A	Tejinder Pal Singh (IND)	18.49	18.43	19.10	19.10		Q
11	B	Eldred Henry (IVB)	18.19	x	17.82	18.19		q
12	B	Eke Kalu (NGR)	17.62	17.56	x	17.62		q
13	A	Henry Baptiste (MRI)	16.78	17.20	x	17.20		
14	B	Mustafa Fall (FIJ)	15.72	15.55	14.92	15.72		
15	A	Nia Misikea (NIU)	11.69	12.13	x	12.13	NR	
16	B	Loe Kaufisi (NIU)	x	9.67	10.62	10.62		

=== Final ===
The medals were determined in the final.

Rank	Name	#1	#2	#3	#4	#5	#6	Result	Notes
1st place, gold medalist(s)	Tomas Walsh (NZL)	20.40	21.21	x	21.41	x	x	21.41	
2nd place, silver medalist(s)	Chukwuebuka Enekwechi (NGR)	20.25	20.70	21.14	20.40	x	20.17	21.14	PB
3rd place, bronze medalist(s)	Tim Nedow (CAN)	20.09	20.00	20.65	20.57	20.41	20.91	20.91	SB
4	O'Dayne Richards (JAM)	20.15	20.80	x	x	x	x	20.80	
5	Damien Birkinhead (AUS)	20.50	20.60	20.44	x	x	20.77	20.77	
6	Orazio Cremona (RSA)	19.87	x	x	20.51	x	20.09	20.51	
7	Ashinia Miller (JAM)	19.68	x	x	x	x	x	19.68	
8	Tejinder Pal Singh (IND)	18.84	18.83	19.42	18.87	x	18.63	19.42	
9	Akeem Stewart (TTO)	18.39	19.10	x	—N/a			19.10	
10	Dillon Simon (DMA)	17.99	18.44	x	—N/a			18.44	
11	Eldred Henry (IVB)	18.19	17.63	x	—N/a			18.19	
12	Eke Kalu (NGR)	16.77	17.66	17.86	—N/a			17.86	
