= 2014 IAAF World Indoor Championships – Men's shot put =

The men's Shot Put at the 2014 IAAF World Indoor Championships took place on 7 March 2014.

== Medalists ==
Gold	Silver	Bronze
Ryan Whiting; United States	David Storl; Germany	Tomas Walsh; New Zealand

== Records ==
Standing records prior to the 2014 IAAF World Indoor Championships
World record	Randy Barnes (USA)	22.66	Los Angeles, United States	20 January 1989
Championship record	Ulf Timmermann (GDR)	22.24	Indianapolis, United States	7 March 1987
World Leading	Ryan Whiting (USA)	22.23	Albuquerque, United States	23 February 2014
African record	Janus Robberts (RSA)	21.47	Norman, United States	1 December 2001
Asian record	Zhang Jun (CHN)	20.16	Nanjing, China	13 February 2012
European record	Ulf Timmermann (GDR)	22.55	Senftenberg, East Germany	11 February 1989
North and Central American and Caribbean record	Randy Barnes (USA)	22.66	Los Angeles, United States	20 January 1989
Oceanian Record	Scott Martin (AUS)	20.83	Valencia, Spain	7 March 2008
South American record	Germán Lauro (ARG)	21.04	Prague, Czech Republic	25 February 2014
Records broken during the 2014 IAAF World Indoor Championships
Oceanian Record	Tomas Walsh (NZL)	21.26	Sopot, Poland	7 March 2014

== Qualification standards ==
Indoor	Outdoor
20.30

== Schedule ==
Date	Time	Round
7 March 2014	10:15	Qualification
7 March 2014	20:05	Final

== Results ==
=== Qualification ===
Qualification: 20.70 (Q) or at least 8 best performers (q) qualified for the final.

Rank	Athlete	Nationality	#1	#2	#3	Result	Notes
1	David Storl	Germany	20.61	x	21.24	21.24	Q
2	Ryan Whiting	United States	20.75			20.75	Q
3	Germán Lauro	Argentina	20.65	20.73		20.73	Q
4	Tomasz Majewski	Poland	19.99	20.60	x	20.60	q
5	Georgi Ivanov	Bulgaria	20.45	19.83	19.53	20.45	q
6	Tomas Walsh	New Zealand	20.18	20.08	20.41	20.41	q, NR
7	Orazio Cremona	South Africa	20.28	x	19.63	20.28	q, SB
8	Aleksandr Lesnoy	Russia	19.67	19.70	20.26	20.26	q
9	Borja Vivas	Spain	19.65	20.19	19.73	20.19	
10	Kurt Roberts	United States	x	x	20.17	20.17	
11	Marco Fortes	Portugal	20.12	20.06	19.95	20.12	
12	Tomáš Staněk	Czech Republic	19.87	20.06	19.27	20.06	
13	Asmir Kolašinac	Serbia	20.04	x	x	20.04	
14	O'Dayne Richards	Jamaica	x	18.72	19.77	19.77	
15	Kemal Mešić	Bosnia and Herzegovina	x	19.49	19.50	19.50	
16	Maksim Sidorov	Russia	18.98	x	x	18.98	
17	Stephen Mozia	Nigeria	x	18.91	x	18.91	
18	Frank Elemba	Congo	x	x	17.74	17.74	NR
19	Jaco Engelbrecht	South Africa	x	16.82	17.59	17.59	SB
	Om Prakash Singh Karhana	India				DNS	

=== Final ===
Rank	Athlete	Nationality	#1	#2	#3	#4	#5	#6	Result	Notes
1st place, gold medalist(s)	Ryan Whiting	United States	20.89	21.47	x	22.05	21.95	21.11	22.05	
2nd place, silver medalist(s)	David Storl	Germany	21.35	21.79	x	x	x	21.19	21.79	SB
3rd place, bronze medalist(s)	Tomas Walsh	New Zealand	x	x	20.12	20.46	20.88	21.26	21.26	AR
4	Tomasz Majewski	Poland	20.76	20.92	20.83	21.04	20.80	20.77	21.04	SB
5	Georgi Ivanov	Bulgaria	x	20.08	21.02	x	x	x	21.02	NR
6	Germán Lauro	Argentina	19.76	20.50	20.06	20.36	x	x	20.50	
7	Orazio Cremona	South Africa	x	x	20.06	x	x	20.49	20.49	PB
8	Aleksandr Lesnoy	Russia	19.50	x	20.16	20.13	x	19.99	20.16	
