= Athletics at the 2016 Summer Olympics – Men's shot put =

Men's shot put at the Games of the XXXI Olympiad
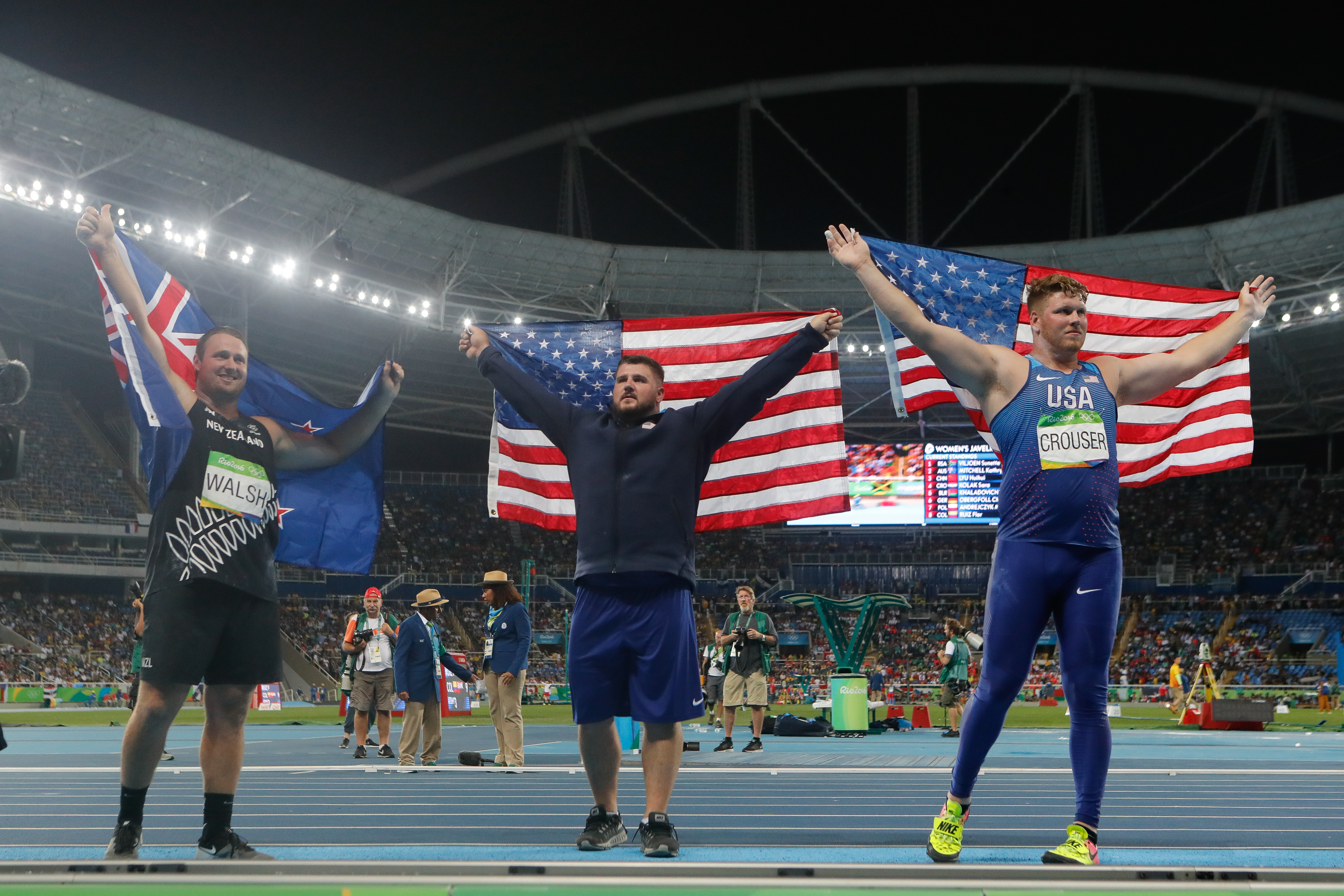
- Left to right: Walsh, Kovacs, Crouser
- Venue: Olympic Stadium
- Date: 18 August 2016
- Competitors: 34 from 24 nations
- Winning distance: 22.52 OR

Medalists
1st place, gold medalist(s)		Ryan Crouser; United States
2nd place, silver medalist(s)		Joe Kovacs; United States
3rd place, bronze medalist(s)		Tomas Walsh; New Zealand

Official Video Highlights

The men's shot put competition at the 2016 Summer Olympics in Rio de Janeiro, Brazil. The event was held at the Olympic Stadium on 18 August. Thirty-four athletes from 24 nations competed. The event was won by Ryan Crouser of the United States, the nation's first victory in the event since 2004 (and 18th overall). His teammate Joe Kovacs took silver. Tomas Walsh earned New Zealand's first medal in the men's shot put (in the country's first appearance in the event since 1972).

== Summary ==
In the final, the surprise find of the season Ryan Crouser set the tone with a 21.15 m on the first throw of the competition. Two throwers later, O'Dayne Richards also set his tone with a big first throw, but his foot went over the toe board. Two time defending champion Tomasz Majewski and his Polish teammate, two time world junior champion Konrad Bukowiecki also had foul trouble. Bukowiecki never got a legal throw in. On the fourth throw of the competition, the home crowd got a thrill as Darlan Romani threw the Brazilian National Record 21.02 m, beating the mark he set earlier in the morning. Two more throws later, Franck Elemba threw 21.20 m to take the lead and set the new national record for the Congo. On the tenth throw, the 2016 world leader Joe Kovacs threw 21.78 m to take over the lead at the end of the first round. Starting the second round, Crouser tossed 22.22 m, to not only take the lead but to become tied for the number 17 thrower in history. Near the end of the round, Tomas Walsh threw 21.20 m, to equal Elemba's distance, but with his second throw of 21.00 Elemba held the tiebreaker for bronze position. For his third round throw, Crouser improved his best to 22.26 m, to advance to become the number 14 thrower in history. After dropping off four competitors and changing the throwing order, Walsh moved into the bronze medal position with a 21.36 m in the fifth round. Then Crouser put the exclamation point on his night's work with a 22.52 m (73 ft 10 1/2 in), beating Ulf Timmermann's Olympic Record from 1988; the days of East German doping dominance. It moved him into a tie for the number 10 thrower in history. Since 2004, only Kovacs has thrown farther.

The medals were presented by Issa Hayatou, IOC member, Cameroon and Karim Ibrahim, Council Member of the IAAF.

== Background ==
This was the 28th appearance of the event, which is one of 12 athletics events to have been held at every Summer Olympics. The returning finalists from the 2012 Games were two-time defending gold medalist Tomasz Majewski of Poland, silver medalist David Storl of Germany, sixth-place finisher Germán Lauro of Argentina, and seventh-place finisher Asmir Kolašinac of Serbia. Storl had won the world championships on either side of the London Games (2011 and 2013), while Joe Kovacs had beaten him in 2015 (Storl came second). Ryan Crouser had a strong performance at the U.S. trials, joining Storl and Kovacs among the favorites for 2016.

The British Virgin Islands, the Republic of the Congo, and Georgia each made their debut in the men's shot put. The United States made its 27th appearance, most of any nation, having missed only the boycotted 1980 Games.

== Qualification ==
A National Olympic Committee (NOC) could enter up to 3 qualified athletes in the men's shot put event if all athletes meet the entry standard during the qualifying period. (The limit of 3 has been in place since the 1930 Olympic Congress.) The qualifying standard was 20.50 metres. The qualifying period was from 1 May 2015 to 11 July 2016. The qualifying distance standards could be obtained in various meets during the given period that have the approval of the IAAF. Only outdoor meets were accepted. NOCs could also use their universality place—each NOC could enter one male athlete regardless of time if they had no male athletes meeting the entry standard for an athletics event—in the shot put.

== Competition format ==
Each athlete received three throws in the qualifying round. All who achieved the qualifying distance of 20.65 metres progressed to the final. If fewer than twelve athletes achieved this mark, then the twelve furthest throwing athletes reached the final. Each finalist was allowed three throws in last round, with the top eight athletes after that point being given three further attempts.

== Records ==
Prior to the competition, the existing world and Olympic records were as follows.

World record	Randy Barnes (USA)	23.12	Westwood, United States	20 May 1990
Olympic record	Ulf Timmermann (GDR)	22.47	Seoul, South Korea	23 September 1988

2016 World leading	Joe Kovacs (USA)	22.13	Eugene, Oregon, United States	22 May 2016

Ryan Crouser broke the 28-year-old Olympic record with his fifth throw of the final, hitting a mark of 22.52 metres. The following national records were established during the competition:

Nation	Athlete	Round	Distance	Notes
Brazil	Darlan Romani	Qualifying	20.94	
Congo	Franck Elemba	Final	21.20	
Brazil	Darlan Romani	Final	21.02	

== Schedule ==
All times are Brasilia Time (UTC-3)

Date	Time	Round
Thursday, 18 August 2016	9:55; 20:30	Qualifying; Final

== Results ==
=== Qualifying round ===
Qualification rule: qualification standard 20.65m (Q) or at least best 12 qualified (q).

Rank	Group	Athlete	Nation	1	2	3	Distance	Notes
1	B	Ryan Crouser	United States	21.59	—	—	21.59	Q
2	B	Tomas Walsh	New Zealand	21.03	—	—	21.03	Q
3	B	Darlan Romani	Brazil	20.94	—	—	20.94	Q, NR
4	A	Jacko Gill	New Zealand	20.19	19.80	20.80	20.80	Q
5	A	Joe Kovacs	United States	19.59	20.73	—	20.73	Q
6	B	Konrad Bukowiecki	Poland	X	20.71	—	20.71	Q
7	A	Tomasz Majewski	Poland	19.87	20.56	20.15	20.56	q
8	A	Stipe Žunić	Croatia	20.52	20.47	20.32	20.52	q
9	B	Damien Birkinhead	Australia	20.32	20.41	20.50	20.50	q
10	B	David Storl	Germany	20.47	X	20.30	20.47	q
11	A	Franck Elemba	Republic of the Congo	19.94	19.94	20.45	20.45	q
12	B	O'Dayne Richards	Jamaica	19.38	20.40	X	20.40	q
13	A	Andrei Gag	Romania	X	X	20.40	20.40	
14	A	Borja Vivas	Spain	19.62	20.25	20.21	20.25	
15	B	Asmir Kolašinac	Serbia	19.86	X	20.16	20.16	
16	A	Tim Nedow	Canada	X	20.00	19.72	20.00	
17	B	Carlos Tobalina	Spain	19.98	19.81	X	19.98	
18	B	Michał Haratyk	Poland	19.36	X	19.97	19.97	
19	A	Germán Lauro	Argentina	19.89	19.56	19.61	19.89	
20	A	Tomáš Staněk	Czech Republic	19.76	X	19.64	19.76	
21	B	Filip Mihaljević	Croatia	19.18	19.69	19.52	19.69	
22	A	Tobias Dahm	Germany	19.62	19.59	19.34	19.62	
23	A	Darrell Hill	United States	18.99	19.56	19.50	19.56	
24	B	Mesud Pezer	Bosnia and Herzegovina	19.06	19.29	19.55	19.55	
25	B	Georgi Ivanov	Bulgaria	19.08	19.49	X	19.49	
26	A	Hamza Alić	Bosnia and Herzegovina	19.48	X	X	19.48	
27	A	Nicholas Scarvelis	Greece	19.07	X	19.37	19.37	
28	A	Stephen Mozia	Nigeria	X	X	18.98	18.98	
29	B	Tsanko Arnaudov	Portugal	X	18.88	X	18.88	
30	A	Kemal Mešić	Bosnia and Herzegovina	18.84	X	18.78	18.78	
31	B	Benik Abrahamyan	Georgia	18.08	18.72	18.35	18.72	
32	B	Ivan Emilianov	Moldova	X	X	17.83	17.83	
33	A	Ivan Ivanov	Kazakhstan	X	17.38	X	17.38	
34	B	Eldred Henry	British Virgin Islands	17.07	X	17.07	17.07	

=== Final ===
Rank	Athlete	Nation	1	2	3	4	5	6	Distance	Notes
1st place, gold medalist(s)	Ryan Crouser	United States	21.15	22.22	22.26	21.93	22.52	21.74	22.52	OR
2nd place, silver medalist(s)	Joe Kovacs	United States	21.78	X	21.52	X	X	21.35	21.78	
3rd place, bronze medalist(s)	Tomas Walsh	New Zealand	20.54	21.20	X	20.75	21.36	21.25	21.36	
4	Franck Elemba	Republic of the Congo	21.20	21.00	20.69	20.76	20.11	X	21.20	NR
5	Darlan Romani	Brazil	21.02	20.60	20.26	X	20.61	X	21.02	NR
6	Tomasz Majewski	Poland	X	X	20.72	X	X	20.52	20.72	
7	David Storl	Germany	X	20.48	20.64	X	20.46	20.60	20.64	
8	O'Dayne Richards	Jamaica	X	20.64	20.34	X	X	X	20.64	
9	Jacko Gill	New Zealand	20.15	20.50	20.26	Did not advance			20.50	
10	Damien Birkinhead	Australia	20.45	X	20.02	Did not advance			20.45	
11	Stipe Žunić	Croatia	19.93	20.04	19.92	Did not advance			20.04	
—	Konrad Bukowiecki	Poland	X	X	X	Did not advance			NM	
