= 2024 World Athletics Indoor Championships – Men's shot put =

Men's shot put at the 2024 World Athletics Indoor Championships
- Venue: Commonwealth Arena
- Dates: 1 March
- Competitors: 16 from 13 nations
- Winning distance: 22.77 CR

Medalists
gold medal	Ryan Crouser	United States
silver medal	Tom Walsh	New Zealand
bronze medal	Leonardo Fabbri	Italy

The men's shot put at the 2024 World Athletics Indoor Championships took place on 1 March 2024.

== Results ==
The final started at 20:19.

Rank	Athlete	Nationality	#1	#2	#3	#4	#5	#6	Result	Notes
1st place, gold medalist(s)	Ryan Crouser	United States	22.36	x	22.00	22.51	22.77	22.69	22.77	CR
2nd place, silver medalist(s)	Tom Walsh	New Zealand	22.07	21.65	21.06	22.03	21.92	21.51	22.07	
3rd place, bronze medalist(s)	Leonardo Fabbri	Italy	21.96	x	20.58	21.82	x	x	21.96	
4	Zane Weir	Italy	x	20.80	21.31	21.85	x	21.13	21.85	SB
5	Jacko Gill	New Zealand	20.76	21.18	20.82	21.69	21.49	21.13	21.69	SB
6	Chukwuebuka Enekwechi	Nigeria	x	21.28	21.21	21.60	21.32	x	21.60	
7	Darlan Romani	Brazil	x	21.11	20.67	20.04	20.83	x	21.11	SB
8	Filip Mihaljević	Croatia	20.28	20.73	x	20.56	x	x	20.73	
9	Mesud Pezer	Bosnia and Herzegovina	19.78	20.41	x				20.41	
10	Scott Lincoln	Great Britain	20.23	20.23	20.36				20.36	
11	Tomáš Staněk	Czech Republic	x	20.15	20.31				20.31	
12	Bob Bertemes	Luxembourg	19.74	20.30	x				20.30	
13	Roger Steen	United States	x	19.97	x				19.97	
14	Mostafa Amr Hassan	Egypt	x	19.75	19.88				19.88	SB
15	Uziel Muñoz	Mexico	19.04	19.28	x				19.28	SB
	Rajindra Campbell	Jamaica	x	x	x				NM	
