= Ashinia Miller =

Jamaican shot putter (born 1993)

Personal information
- Born: 6 June 1993 (age 33) Kingston, Jamaica
- Height: 1.92 m (6 ft 4 in)

Sport
- Country: Jamaica
- Sport: Athletics
- Event: shot put
- College team: Georgia Bulldogs
- Coached by: Don Babbitt
Medal record
Men's athletics
Representing Jamaica
Central American and Caribbean Games
Silver medal – second place	2018 Barranquilla	shot Put
Pan American Junior Championships
Gold medal – first place	2011 Miramar	shot put
CAC Junior Championships
Gold medal – first place	2012 San Salvador	shot put
CARIFTA Games (Junior)
Silver medal – second place	2010 George Town	shot put
Gold medal – first place	2011 Montego Bay	shot put
Gold medal – first place	2012 Hamilton	shot put
Bronze medal – third place	2012 Hamilton	discus throw
CARIFTA Games (Youth)
Gold medal – first place	2009 Vieux Fort	shot put
Gold medal – first place	2009 Vieux Fort	discus throw
- Updated on 11 August 2019

Ashinia Miller (born 6 June 1993 in Kingston) is a Jamaican shot putter. He was studied at University of Georgia, United States between 2013-2016. He represented Jamaica at the 2018 Commonwealth Games.

== Career ==
He won a gold medal in the shot put at the 2011 Pan American Junior Athletics Championships, and the 2012 Central American and Caribbean Junior Championships.

His personal bests stand at 20.54 m (67.4 ft) indoor and 20.93 m (68.7 ft) outdoor.

== Personal best ==
Event	Result	Venue	Date
Outdoor
Shot put	20.93 m	(Bermuda) Hamilton	11 May 2018
Discus throw	54.35 m	(United States) Athens	16 March 2013
Indoor
Shot put	20.54 m	(United States) New York	9 February 2019

== Achievements ==
Year	Competition	Venue	Position	Event	Notes
Representing Jamaica
2009	CARIFTA Games (U17)	Vieux Fort, Saint Lucia	1st	shot put (5 kg)	16.62 m
2009	CARIFTA Games (U17)	Vieux Fort, Saint Lucia	1st	discus throw (1.5 kg)	49.21 m
2010	CARIFTA Games (U20)	George Town, Cayman Islands	2nd	shot put (6 kg)	18.41 m
2010	CAC Junior Championships (U20)	Santo Domingo, Dominican Republic	4th	shot put (6 kg)	17.21 m
2010	World Junior Championships	Moncton, Canada	20th (h)	shot put (6 kg)	17.44 m
2010	Summer Youth Olympics	Bishan, Singapore	14th (final B)	shot put (5 kg)	17.76 m
2011	CARIFTA Games (U20)	Montego Bay, Jamaica	1st	shot put (6 kg)	19.47 m CR
2011	CARIFTA Games (U20)	Montego Bay, Jamaica	4th	discus throw (1.75 kg)	49.20 m
2011	Pan American Junior Championships	Miramar, United States	1st	shot put (6 kg)	19.97 m NJR
2012	CARIFTA Games (U20)	Hamilton, Bermuda	1st	shot put (6 kg)	18.96 m
2012	CARIFTA Games (U20)	Hamilton, Bermuda	3rd	discus throw (1.75 kg)	50.37 m
2012	CAC Junior Championships (U20)	San Salvador, El Salvador	1st	shot put (6 kg)	19.70 m CR
2012	World Junior Championships	Barcelona, Spain	11th	shot put (6 kg)	18.70 m
2015	NACAC Championships	San José, Costa Rica	6th	shot put	18.35 m
2018	Commonwealth Games	Gold Coast, Australia	7th	shot put	19.68 m
2018	Central American and Caribbean Games	Barranquilla, Colombia	2nd	shot put	20.19 m
2018	NACAC Championships	Toronto, Canada	4th	shot put	20.85 m
2019	Pan American Games	Lima, Peru	8th	shot put	19.17 m
