= Uziel Muñoz =

Mexican shot putter (born 1995)

Personal information
- Full name: Uziel Muñoz Galarza
- Born: 8 September 1995 (age 30) Nuevo Casas Grandes, Chihuahua, Mexico
- Education: Universidad Autónoma de Ciudad Juárez
- Height: 1.85 m (6 ft 1 in)
- Weight: 121 kg (267 lb)

Sport
- Sport: Athletics
- Event: Shot put
Medal record
Men's athletics
Representing Mexico
World Championships
Silver medal – second place	2025 Tokyo	Shot put
NACAC Championships
Silver medal – second place	2025 Freeport	Shot put
Pan American Games
Silver medal – second place	2023 Santiago	Shot put
Bronze medal – third place	2019 Lima	Shot put
Central American and Caribbean Games
Gold medal – first place	2023 San Salvador	Shot put
CAC Junior Championships
Silver medal – second place	2014 Morelia	Shot put
Silver medal – second place	2014 Morelia	Discus throw
Universiade
Bronze medal – third place	2019 Naples	Shot put

Uziel Muñoz Galarza (born 8 September 1995) is a Mexican athlete specialising in the shot put. He won the silver medal at the 2025 World Athletics Championships, to become the first Mexican to win a medal in a throwing event at the World Athletics Championships.

Born in Nuevo Casas Grandes, his personal bests in the event are 21.97 metres outdoors (2025 Tokyo World Championships) and 19.67 metres indoors (Albuquerque 2019).

== Personal bests ==
- Shot put (outdoor): 21.97 m NR – National Stadium, Tokyo, Japan, 13 September 2025
- Shot put (indoor): 19.67 m – Albuquerque, USA, 26 January 2019

== International competitions ==
Year	Competition	Venue	Position	Event	Notes
Representing Mexico
2014	Central American and Caribbean; Junior Championships (U20)	Morelia, Mexico	2nd	Shot put (6 kg)	17.35 m
2014	Central American and Caribbean; Junior Championships (U20)	Morelia, Mexico	2nd	Discus throw (1.75 kg)	51.87 m
2018	Central American and Caribbean Games	Barranquilla, Colombia	4th	Shot put	19.87 m
2019	Universiade	Naples, Italy	3rd	Shot put	20.45 m
2019	Pan American Games	Lima, Peru	3rd	Shot put	20.56 m
2019	World Championships	Doha, Qatar	34th (q)	Shot put	19.06 m
2022	World Championships	Eugene, United States	11th	Shot put	20.65 m
2023	Central American and Caribbean Games	San Salvador, El Salvador	1st	Shot put	20.81 m
2023	Central American and Caribbean Games	San Salvador, El Salvador	5th	Discus throw	55.22 m
2023	World Championships	Budapest, Hungary	15th (q)	Shot put	20.62 m
2023	Pan American Games	Santiago, Chile	2nd	Shot put	21.15 m
2024	World Indoor Championships	Glasgow, United Kingdom	15th	Shot put	19.28 m
2024	Olympic Games	Paris, France	8th	Shot put	20.88 m
2025	NACAC Championships	Freeport, Bahamas	2nd	Shot put	20.89 m
2025	World Championships	Tokyo, Japan	2nd	Shot put	21.97 m
2026	World Indoor Championships	Toruń, Poland	10th	Shot put	20.30 m
2026	Central American and Caribbean Games	Santo Domingo, Dominican Republic	1st	Shot put	20.51 m
