= Benik Abrahamyan =

Georgian shot putter (born 1985)

Benik Abrahamyan (born 31 July 1985) is an Armenian-Georgian shot putter. He competed at the 2016 Summer Olympics in the men's shot put event. His result of 18.72 meters in the qualifying round did not qualify him for the final.

Abrahamyan received a two-year ban in 2011 for a doping violation. He also received a seven-year ban for a second doping violation just prior to the Tokyo 2020 Olympic Games.
