= Damien Birkinhead =

Australian shot putter (born 1993)

Personal information
- Born: 8 April 1993 (age 33) Whittington, Australia
- Height: 1.90 m (6 ft 3 in)
- Weight: 140 kg (309 lb)

Sport
- Sport: Athletics
- Event: Shot put
- Club: Corio
- Coached by: Scott Martin (2012–)

Damien Birkinhead (born 8 April 1993) is an Australian shot putter who competed in the 2016 Summer Olympics in Rio de Janeiro. He placed tenth in the final. His personal bests are 21.35 metres outdoors (Hobart 2016) and 19.11 metres indoors (Birmingham 2018).

== International competitions ==
Year	Competition	Venue	Position	Event	Notes
Representing Australia
2009	World Youth Championships	Brixen, Italy	18th (q)	Shot put (5 kg)	17.99 m
2010	Youth Olympic Games	Singapore	4th	Shot put (5 kg)	20.55 m
2012	World Junior Championships	Barcelona, Spain	3rd	Shot put (6 kg)	21.14 m
2014	CommonwealthGames	Glasgow, United Kingdom	5th	Shot put	19.59 m
2016	Olympic Games	Rio de Janeiro, Brazil	10th	Shot put	20.45 m
2017	World Championships	London, United Kingdom	20th (q)	Shot put	19.90 m
2018	World Indoor Championships	Birmingham, United Kingdom	16th	Shot put	19.90 m
2018	Commonwealth Games	Gold Coast, Queensland	5th	Shot put	20.77 m
