= Jacko Gill =

New Zealand shot putter (born 1994)

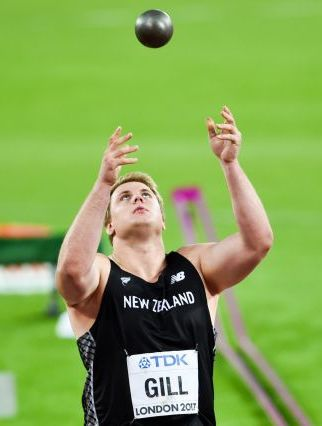
- Gill at the 2017 World Championships

Personal information
- Full name: Jackson Gill
- Born: 20 December 1994 (age 31) Auckland, New Zealand
- Height: 1.90 m (6 ft 3 in) (2011)
- Weight: 118 kg (260 lb) (2012)

Sport
- Country: New Zealand
- Sport: Athletics
- Event: Shot put

Achievements and titles
- National finals: Shot put champion (2023)
- Personal bests: 5 kg: 24.45 m (2011, WYB); 6 kg: 23.00 m (2013, WJR); 7.26 kg: 22.12 m (2023)
Medal record
Men's athletics
Representing New Zealand
Commonwealth Games
Silver medal – second place	2022 Birmingham	Shot put
Oceania Athletics Championships
Gold medal – first place	2014 Rarotonga	Shot put
Gold medal – first place	2019 Townsville	Shot put
Gold medal – first place	2026 Darwin	Shot put
World Junior Championships
Gold medal – first place	2012 Barcelona	Shot put
Gold medal – first place	2010 Moncton	Shot put
Summer Youth Olympics
Silver medal – second place	2010 Singapore	Shot put
World Youth Championships
Gold medal – first place	2011 Lille	Shot put
Oceania Youth Championships
Gold medal – first place	2010 Sydney	Shot put
Gold medal – first place	2010 Sydney	Discus throw

Jackson Gill (born 20 December 1994) is a New Zealand track and field athlete who competes in the shot put. Gill throws with his right hand, using the spin technique. In 2010, he won gold in the shot put at the World Junior Championships at the age of 15 years, 213 days, which made him the youngest ever male gold medalist at the World Junior Championships (surpassing Usain Bolt who was 15 years, 332 days old when he won the 200 metres in 2002). In 2012, he defended his title at the 2012 World Junior Championships.

== Career ==
Gill first came to prominence in late 2009 when he set world age-14 bests with the 5 kg Shot (20.42m) and 6 kg Shot (17.41m). At the 2010 World Junior Championships in Athletics, as a 15-year-old, Gill won the gold in the shot put (6 kg) with a distance of 20.76m, beating 18- and 19-year-olds and becoming the youngest-ever male junior champion.

In 2010, prior to the World Junior Championships, Gill threw the 5 kg shot 22.53m at an event in Stockholm, Sweden, exceeding the best-known performances with that weight for 15- and 16-year-olds. He improved to 22.60m in finishing second at the inaugural Youth Olympic Games despite being unwell. On 11 December 2010, at the New Zealand National Secondary Schools Championships, Gill set a youth (under-18) world-best performance of 23.86m (5 kg).

On 26 March 2011, at the New Zealand National Championships, Gill achieved 21.34m with the 6 kg shot, at the time ranking him 4th on the all-time IAAF junior list for shot put.

On 23 April 2011, at 16 years of age, Gill threw 20.01m with the senior shot (7.26 kg). Gill's throw broke the 44-year-old New Zealand national record set by Les Mills in 1967. This performance surpassed the standard for the 2011 Athletics World Championships, however the rules for that competition exclude anyone of Jacko's age competing in any throwing events. An appeal to the IAAF for an exception to be made to this regulation to allow Gill to compete was rejected. The performance also surpassed the B standard for the 2012 Olympics however not only was it outside the qualifying period (which started on 1 May) it was also less than the qualification standard (20.30m) subsequently set by Athletics New Zealand. On 5 December 2011 he qualified for the 2012 Olympics by throwing 20.38m. On the same occasion he threw 22.31 with the 6 kg shot to become the second furthest junior (under-20) thrower ever with that weight. Gill has been reported as the youngest and one of the lightest athletes to throw over 20m.

On 7 July 2011 at the 2011 World Youth Championships in Athletics in Lille Métropole, France, Gill won the gold medal by 4m with a World Youth Best Performance of 24.35m, which he subsequently improved later that year with a throw of 24.45m in Auckland on 12 December.

On 20 July 2013 Gill broke the Oceania Junior Record with 22.32m at Brisbane, Australia. He surpassed this with 22.54m at the North Shore, Auckland on 4 August. On 18 August, also at the North Shore in Auckland, he threw 23.00 to break the World Junior Record.

On 25 June 2014 in Rarotonga, Gill improved his personal best to 20.70m in winning the shot put title at the 2014 Oceania Area Championships in Athletics.

== Personal life ==
Gill's father, Walter, is a former discus thrower and national shot-put champion, and his mother, Nerida, is a former discus thrower. He attended Takapuna Grammar School until 2010. Jacko was the subject of a "feature" interview for the IAAF's March 2013 monthly on-line newsletter, in which he said he had a keen interest in the shot from an early age: "Since about 10 years old I've decided to write all of my lifting programs and schedules for my training. I didn't really fit in well at gyms, so I decided to do all weights in our garage at home. I enjoy weight-lifting, power-lifting mainly, so will lift for around four hours a day, and throw only a couple of times per week. " He also said that his athletic "hero" is Ricky Bruch, a former Discus World record-holder from Sweden.

=== Coaching ===
Gill was coached by Didier Poppé during the years of his World Youth and World Junior Championships campaigns. In late 2012 he began training under the direction of former New Zealand shot champion Courtney Ireland and was later coached by Kirsten Hellier.

== Achievements ==
Year	Competition	Venue	Position	Event	Notes
Representing New Zealand
2010	Oceania Youth Championships	Sydney, Australia	1st	Shot put (5 kg)	20.62 m
2010	Oceania Youth Championships	Sydney, Australia	1st	Discus throw (1.5 kg)	56.64 m
2010	World Junior Championships	Moncton, Canada	1st	Shot put (6 kg)	20.76 m
2010	Youth Olympic Games	Singapore	2nd	Shot put (5 kg)	22.60 m
2011	World Youth Championships	Lille, France	1st	Shot put (5 kg)	24.35 m
2012	World Junior Championships	Barcelona, Spain	1st	Shot put (6 kg)	22.20 m
2014	Oceania Championships	Avarua, Cook Islands	1st	Shot put	20.70 m
2014	Commonwealth Games	Glasgow, United Kingdom	11th	Shot put	18.05 m
2015	World Championships	Beijing, China	8th	Shot put	20.11 m
2016	World Indoor Championships	Portland, United States	9th	Shot put	19.93 m
2016	Olympic Games	Rio de Janeiro, Brazil	9th	Shot put	20.50 m
2017	World Championships	London, United Kingdom	9th	Shot put	20.82 m
2019	Oceania Championships	Townsville, Australia	1st	Shot put	20.75 m
2019	World Championships	Doha, Qatar	7th	Shot put	21.45 m
2021	Olympic Games	Tokyo, Japan	9th	Shot put	20.71 m
2022	World Championships	Eugene, United States	7th	Shot put	21.40 m
2022	Commonwealth Games	Birmingham, United Kingdom	2nd	Shot put	21.90 m
2023	World Championships	Budapest, Hungary	6th	Shot put	21.76 m
2024	World Indoor Championships	Glasgow, United Kingdom	5th	Shot put	21.69 m
2024	Olympic Games	Paris, France	7th	Shot put	21.15 m

Awards
Preceded by Gareth Kean	Halberg Awards – Emerging Talent Award; 2011	Succeeded by Lydia Ko
