= Athletics at the 2015 Pan American Games – Men's shot put =

Men's shot put at the 2015 Pan American Games
- Venue: CIBC Pan Am and Parapan Am Athletics Stadium
- Dates: July 21
- Competitors: 12 from 8 nations
- Winning distance: 21.69

Medalists
Gold medal	O'Dayne Richards	Jamaica
Silver medal	Tim Nedow	Canada
Bronze medal	Germán Lauro	Argentina

The men's shot put competition of the athletics events at the 2015 Pan American Games took place on July 21 at the CIBC Pan Am and Parapan Am Athletics Stadium. The defending Pan American Games champion is Dylan Armstrong of Canada.

== Records ==
Prior to this competition, the existing world and Pan American Games records were as follows:

World record	Randy Barnes (USA)	23.12	Westwood, United States	May 20, 1990
Pan American Games record	Dylan Armstrong (CAN)	21.30	Guadalajara, Mexico	October 25, 2011

== Qualification ==
Each National Olympic Committee (NOC) was able to enter up to two entrants providing they had met the minimum standard (18.14) in the qualifying period (January 1, 2014 to June 28, 2015).

== Schedule ==
Date	Time	Round
July 21, 2015	18:10	Final

== Results ==
All results shown are in meters.

KEY:	q	Best non-qualifiers	Q	Qualified	NR	National record	PB	Personal best	SB	Seasonal best	DQ	Disqualified

=== Final ===
Rank	Name	Nationality	#1	#2	#3	#4	#5	#6	Mark	Notes
1st place, gold medalist(s)	O'Dayne Richards	Jamaica	20.36	21.69	20.50	20.07	20.23	x	21.69	PR, NR
2nd place, silver medalist(s)	Tim Nedow	Canada	19.42	19.25	19.49	20.09	20.53	20.46	20.53	SB
3rd place, bronze medalist(s)	Germán Lauro	Argentina	x	20.24	x	x	x	x	20.24	
4	Darrell Hill	United States	20.10	x	x	x	x	x	20.10	
5	Jonathan Jones	United States	19.88	19.56	x	19.54	x	x	19.88	
6	Darlan Romani	Brazil	18.90	19.74	x	x	19.37	x	19.74	
7	Dillon Simon	Dominica	18.49	19.55	x	19.27	18.96	19.54	19.55	
8	Stephen Sáenz	Mexico	18.55	x	18.58	18.45	x	x	18.58	
9	Raymond Brown	Jamaica	17.68	17.59	18.39				18.39	
10	Timothy Hendry-Gallagher	Canada	18.24	x	x				18.24	
11	Mario Cota	Mexico	17.35	17.53	x				17.53	
12	Eldred Henry	British Virgin Islands	16.47	x	x				16.47	
