= Eldred Henry =

British Virgin Island shot putter and discus thrower

Personal information
- Born: 18 September 1994 (age 31) Road Town, British Virgin Islands
- Education: Central Arizona College
- Height: 1.96 m (6 ft 5 in)
- Weight: 180 kg (397 lb)

Sport
- Sport: Athletics
- Events: Shot put, discus throw

Eldred Henry (born 18 September 1994) is an athlete from the British Virgin Islands competing in the shot put and discus throw. He represented his country at the 2016 Summer Olympics finishing last in the qualifying round. Earlier, he competed at the 2014 Commonwealth Games and 2015 Pan American Games. He is the current national record holder in several events.

== International competitions ==
Year	Competition	Venue	Position	Event	Notes
Representing British Virgin Islands
2012	Central American and Caribbean; Junior Championships (U20)	San Salvador, El Salvador	6th	Shot put (6 kg)	16.32 m
2012	Central American and Caribbean; Junior Championships (U20)	San Salvador, El Salvador	4th	Discus throw (1.75 kg)	44.59 m
2013	CARIFTA Games (U20)	Nassau, Bahamas	3rd	Shot put (6 kg)	18.01 m
2013	CARIFTA Games (U20)	Nassau, Bahamas	3rd	Discus throw (1.75 kg)	52.06 m
2014	Commonwealth Games	Glasgow, United Kingdom	16th (q)	Shot put	17.08 m
2014	Commonwealth Games	Glasgow, United Kingdom	15th (q)	Discus throw	51.39 m
2014	NACAC U23 Championships	Kamloops, Canada	5th	Shot put	16.98 m
2014	NACAC U23 Championships	Kamloops, Canada	4th	Discus throw	52.15 m
2015	Pan American Games	Toronto, Canada	12th	Shot put	16.47 m
2015	Pan American Games	Toronto, Canada	–	Discus throw	NM
2015	NACAC Championships	San José, Costa Rica	5th	Shot put	18.49 m
2015	NACAC Championships	San José, Costa Rica	6th	Discus throw	52.82 m
2016	NACAC U23 Championships	San Salvador, El Salvador	3rd	Shot put	19.11 m
2016	NACAC U23 Championships	San Salvador, El Salvador	3rd	Discus throw	56.45 m
2016	Olympic Games	Rio de Janeiro, Brazil	34th (q)	Shot put	17.07 m
2018	Commonwealth Games	Gold Coast, Australia	11th	Shot put	18.19 m
2018	Commonwealth Games	Gold Coast, Australia	11th	Discus throw	50.96 m
2018	Central American and Caribbean Games	Barranquilla, Colombia	3rd	Shot put	20.18 m
2018	NACAC Championships	Toronto, Canada	5th	Shot put	20.63 m
2019	Pan American Games	Lima, Peru	6th	Shot put	19.82 m
2019	World Championships	Doha, Qatar	21st (q)	Shot put	20.13 m
2022	NACAC Championships	Freeport, Bahamas	4th	Shot put	18.78 m
2023	Central American and Caribbean Games	San Salvador, El Salvador	6th	Shot put	18.12 m
2023	Pan American Games	Santiago, Chile	11th	Shot put	16.98 m

== Personal bests ==
Outdoor

- Shot put – 21.47 (Kingsville 2019) NR and CR and NCAA DII Record
- Weight throw – 18.32 (Coolidge 2015) NR
- Discus throw – 61.90 (La Jolla 2014) NR
- Hammer throw – 47.48 (Hutchinson 2015) NR

Indoor

- Shot put – 20.61 (Glendale 2015) NR
- Weight throw – 17.97 (Albuquerque 2015) NR
