= Ryan Whiting =

American shot putter (born 1986)

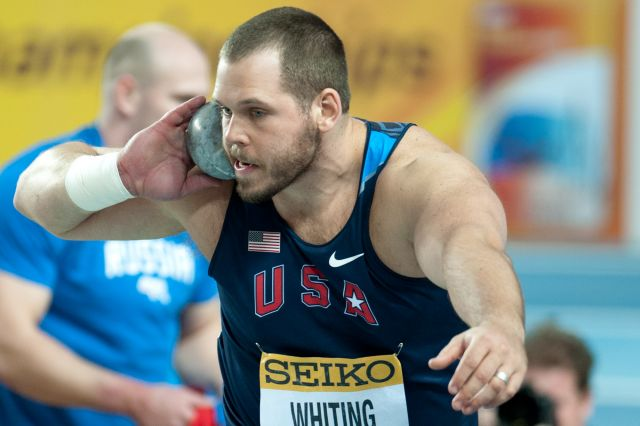
- Whiting during 2012 IAAF World Indoor Championships in Istanbul.

Personal information
- Full name: Ryan Keith Whiting
- Nationality: American
- Born: November 24, 1986 (age 39) Harrisburg, Pennsylvania, U.S.
- Height: 6 ft 3 in (191 cm)
- Weight: 295 lb (134 kg)

Sport
- Country: United States
- Sport: Track and field
- Event: Shot put
- College team: Arizona State University
- Coached by: David Dumble

Achievements and titles
- Personal bests: Shot put: 22.28 m (73 ft 1 in); Shot put (indoors): 22.35 m (73 ft 3 3/4 in)
Medal record
Men's athletics
Representing the United States
World Championships
Silver medal – second place	2013 Moscow	Shot put
World Indoor Championships
Gold medal – first place	2012 Istanbul	Shot put
Gold medal – first place	2014 Sopot	Shot put
Pan American Junior Championships
Gold medal – first place	2005 Windsor	Discus throw
Gold medal – first place	2005 Windsor	Shot put

Ryan Keith Whiting (born November 24, 1986) is an American track and field coach and retired athlete who competed in shot put. His biggest international success as an athlete was first place at the 2012 World Indoor Championships. He represented the United States at the 2011 World Championships in Athletics, 2013 World Championships in Athletics, 2014 IAAF World Indoor Championships and the 2012 London Olympics.

He competed for the Arizona State Sun Devils collegiately and won six NCAA titles while there. His throw of 21.73 m (71 ft 3 1/2 in) to win the 2008 NCAA Indoor title is the best mark by a college student indoors. He was the 2011, 2013, and 2014 American indoor champion.

== Early life and career ==
Ryan Whiting was born in Harrisburg, Pennsylvania, the son of Kent and Jill Whiting. Whiting attended Central Dauphin High School and started competing in shot put and discus throw events as a teenager. Whiting made his international debut at the 2005 Pan American Junior Athletics Championships, where he won both events with personal record marks. He was chosen as the Gatorade Male Track and Field Athlete of the year, ranking him as the top American high school track-and-fielder. Entering the senior ranks, he cleared 19 metres in the shot put for the first time at the USA Indoor Track and Field Championships, placing eighth with a throw of 19.36 m. By the end of the season he had improved his personal records to 19.75 m (64 ft 9 1/2 in) for the shot and 59.44 m (195 ft 0 in) for the discus.

He started a majoring in civil engineering at Arizona State University in 2006 and began competing athletically for the Arizona State Sun Devils in 2007. In his first indoor season for the team he raised the school record to 20.01 m (65 ft 7 3/4 in) to take third in the shot at the NCAA Men's Indoor Track and Field Championship. Outdoors he was third at the Pac-10 championships and fourth at the NCAA Men's Outdoor Track and Field Championship. He improved his overall best in the shot to 20.35 m (66 ft 9 in).

=== NCAA titles ===
Whiting was much improved in his second season for the Sun Devils and secured the NCAA Indoor title in the shot put with a throw of 21.73 m (71 ft 3 1/2 in) – this was an American collegiate indoor record and raised him to thirteenth on the all-time indoor lists. He threw a personal record of 61.11 m (200 ft 5 3/4 in) for the discus in March. He did not bring his indoor form to the outdoor season and was runner-up in the shot at both the Pac-10 and NCAA outdoor championships. He also ranked top ten in the discus at the NCAA meet and placed sixth in the shot put at the USA Outdoor Track and Field Championships. He performed well at the season-ending 2008 NACAC Under-23 Championships in Athletics, taking the shot put gold and discus silver medals.

In his third year of competition for Arizona State, he was dominant in collegiate events. He defended his NCAA Indoor shot put title with a throw of 20.16 m (66 ft 1 1/2 in). He had a string of victories outdoors, taking the Pac-10, NCAA West, and NCAA Outdoor titles. His throw of 20.99 m (68 ft 10 1/4 in) at the NCAA West Regionals was his best outdoors and a school record. He also qualified for the NCAA finals in the discus throw and finished as runner-up by a narrow margin. He again was ranked top ten in the shot put at the USA national championships.

In his final season for the Sun Devils he won a third NCAA indoor title with a throw of 21.52 m. He swept the Pac-10 outdoor shot put and discus throw titles before going on to claim the same double at the NCAA Outdoor Championships. In winning the shot put title, he threw a mark of 21.97 m (72 ft 3/4 in) – a personal record and three centimetres off the overall collegiate record of 22 metres held by John Godina.

Over the course of his four years competing for Arizona State University, he earned nine NCAA All-American honours and six NCAA titles (three indoor shot put, two outdoor shot put, one discus). The U.S. Track & Field and Cross Country Coaches Association selected him as the American indoor performer of the year for 2008. In addition, he excelled off the field with his studies: he was twice chosen for the second team of the Academic All-America student-athlete program and received a number of Pac-10 and USTFCCCA All-Academic honours.

== Professional career ==
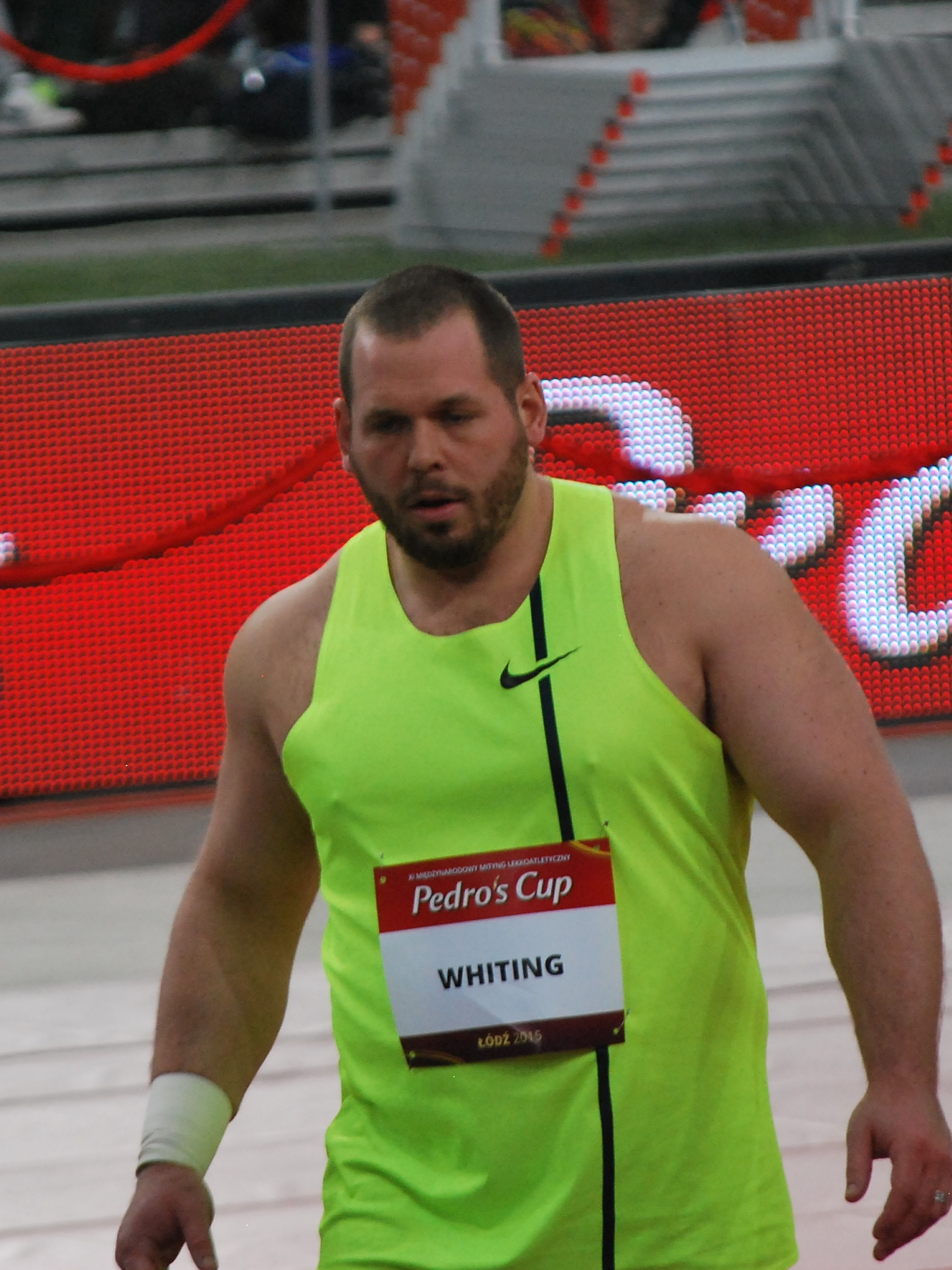
Ryan Whiting in 2015.

Whiting signed up with Nike Inc. in 2010, while still at Arizona State, and began to compete on the American track and field circuit that year. He was runner-up to Christian Cantwell at the 2010 USA Indoor Championships and placed fifth at the USA Outdoors. Following his graduation from Arizona State in 2010, he began to focus on shot putting full-time. Returning to his native Pennsylvania, Whiting became a volunteer coach on the Penn State University track and field staff. He secured his first national title at the 2011 USA Indoor Championships, easily beating second-placed Dan Taylor. He came fourth at the 2011 USA Outdoor Track and Field Championships, but because Cantwell automatically entered as defending champion, Whiting still gained a spot for the 2011 World Championships in Athletics. On his global debut, he came seventh in the men's shot put final. He also performed well on the IAAF Diamond League circuit, having top three finishes on the Doha, Lausanne and Zürich legs in 2011. In 2012, Ryan was USA indoor runner-up.

He established his place among the world's top throwers with a win at the 2012 IAAF World Indoor Championships, winning the gold medal with a throw of 22 m (72 ft 2 in). He did not match this form outdoors that year, but still managed a number of podium finishes on the 2011 IAAF Diamond League circuit (Shanghai, Stockholm and Zürich). His best outdoor throw of the year came at the 2012 United States Olympic Trials, where his mark of 21.66 m brought him second place behind Reese Hoffa. Representing the United States at the Olympics for the first time, he reached his second outdoor global final, this time placing ninth with a mark of 20.64 m.

Whiting finished 1st in the Shot Put on 7 March 2014 at the 2014 IAAF World Indoor Championships.

== Personal life ==
He has two brothers, Evan and Ross. He married his wife, Ashley, in 2011.

== Major competition record ==
Year	Competition	Venue	Position	Event	Notes
Representing the United States
2005	Pan American Junior Championships	Windsor, Canada	1st	Shot put (6 kg)	19.75 m
2005	Pan American Junior Championships	Windsor, Canada	1st	Discus throw (1.750 kg)	61.40 m
2008	NACAC U23 Championships	Toluca, Mexico	1st	Shot put	19.46 m A
2008	NACAC U23 Championships	Toluca, Mexico	2nd	Discus throw	53.47 m A
2011	World Championships	Daegu, South Korea	6th	Shot put	20.75 m
2012	World Indoor Championships	Istanbul, Turkey	1st	Shot put	22.00 m
2012	Olympic Games	London, United Kingdom	9th	Shot put	20.64 m
2013	World Championships	Moscow, Russia	2nd	Shot put	21.57 m
2014	World Indoor Championships	Sopot, Poland	1st	Shot put	22.05 m
2017	World Championships	London, United Kingdom	7th	Shot put	21.09 m
2018	World Indoor Championships	Birmingham, United Kingdom	7th	Shot put	21.03 m

== Personal bests ==
Event	Best (m)	Venue	Date
Shot put (outdoor)	22.28	Doha, Qatar	May 10, 2013
Shot put (indoor)	22.23	Albuquerque, New Mexico	February 23, 2014
Discus throw (outdoor)	61.11	Tempe, Arizona	March 29, 2008

- All information taken from IAAF profile.

== See also ==
- List of Pennsylvania State University Olympians
