= O'Dayne Richards =

Jamaican athletics competitor

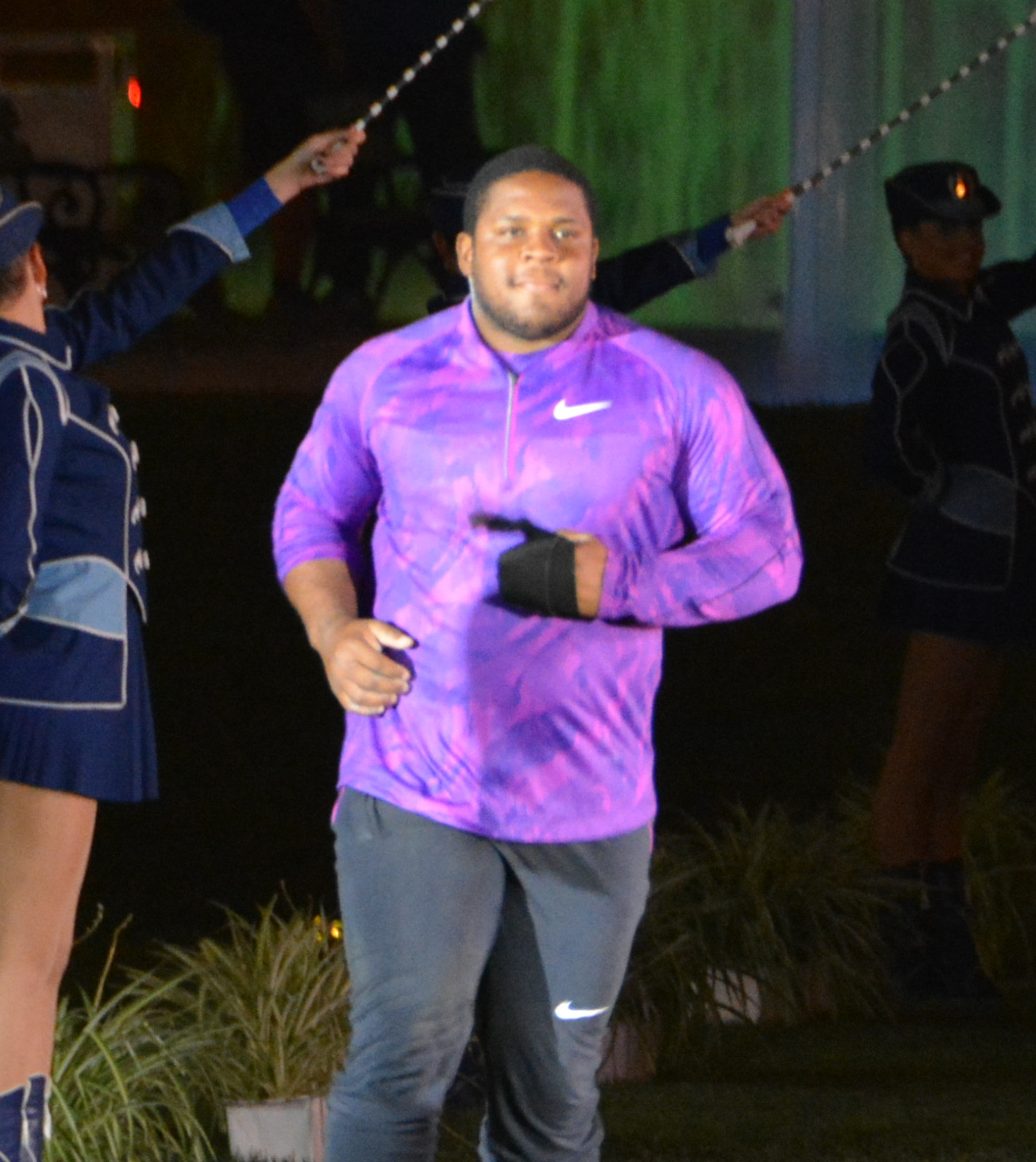
- Richards at the 2015 Hanžeković Memorial

Personal information
- Full name: O'Dayne Valentin Richards
- Born: December 14, 1988 (age 37) Saint Andrew, Jamaica
- Height: 1.78 m (5 ft 10 in)
- Weight: 118 kg (260 lb)

Sport
- Country: Jamaica
- Sport: Track and field
- Event: Shot put

Achievements and titles
- Personal best: Outdoor 21.96 m (72 ft 1/2 in)
Medal record
Men's athletics
Representing Jamaica
World Championships
Bronze medal – third place	2015 Beijing	Shot put
Commonwealth Games
Gold medal – first place	2014 Glasgow	Shot put
Pan American Games
Gold medal – first place	2015 Toronto	Shot put
NACAC Championships
Bronze medal – third place	2022 Freeport	Shot put
Bronze medal – third place	2018 Toronto	Shot put
Central American and Caribbean Games
Gold medal – first place	2018 Barranquilla	Shot put
Silver medal – second place	2010 Mayagüez	Shot put
CAC Championships
Gold medal – first place	2011 Mayagüez	Shot put
Gold medal – first place	2013 Morelia	Shot put

O'Dayne Valentin Richards (born December 14, 1988) is a Jamaican athlete competing in the shot put and discus throw. He studied at the University of Technology, Jamaica.

== Achievements ==
Year	Competition	Venue	Position	Event	Notes
Representing Jamaica
2010	NACAC U23 Championships	Miramar, United States	3rd	Shot put	18.03 m
2010	Central American and Caribbean Games	Mayagüez, Puerto Rico	2nd	Shot put	18.74 m
2010	Central American and Caribbean Games	Mayagüez, Puerto Rico	4th	Discus throw	54.10 m
2011	Central American and Caribbean Championships	Mayagüez, Puerto Rico	1st	Shot put	19.16 m
2011	Universiade	Shenzhen, China	1st	Shot put	19.93 m
2011	Universiade	Shenzhen, China	21st (q)	Discus throw	47.46 m
2013	Central American and Caribbean Championships	Morelia, Mexico	1st	Shot put	20.97 m
2013	World Championships	Moscow, Russia	20th (q)	Shot put	19.08 m
2014	World Indoor Championships	Sopot, Poland	14th (q)	Shot put	19.77 m
2014	Commonwealth Games	Glasgow, United Kingdom	1st	Shot put	21.61 m
2015	Pan American Games	Toronto, Canada	1st	Shot put	21.69 m
2015	World Championships	Beijing, China	3rd	Shot put	21.69 m
2016	Olympic Games	Rio de Janeiro, Brazil	8th	Shot put	20.64 m
2017	World Championships	London, United Kingdom	19th (q)	Shot put	19.95 m
2018	World Indoor Championships	Birmingham, United Kingdom	11th	Shot put	19.93 m
2018	Commonwealth Games	Gold Coast, Australia	4th	Shot put	20.80 m
2018	Central American and Caribbean Games	Barranquilla, Colombia	1st	Shot put	21.02 m
2018	NACAC Championships	Toronto, Canada	3rd	Shot put	20.89 m
2019	Pan American Games	Lima, Peru	5th	Shot put	20.07 m
2019	World Championships	Doha, Qatar	22nd (q)	Shot put	20.07 m
2019	NACAC Championships	Freeport, Bahamas	3rd	Shot put	20.05 m
2023	Pan American Games	Santiago, Chile	9th	Shot put	18.37 m

== Personal bests ==
Outdoor

- Shot Put – 21.96 (Rabat 2017)
- Discus Throw – 58.31 (Kingston 2012)

Indoor

- Shot Put – 19.93 (Birmingham 2018)
