= Justin Rodhe =

American born Canadian shot putter

Personal information
- Nationality: Canadian
- Born: October 17, 1984 (age 41) Bainbridge, Ohio
- Height: 6 ft 0 in (1.83 m)
- Weight: 280 lb (130 kg; 20 st)

Sport
- Sport: Track and field
- Event: Shot put

Achievements and titles
- Personal bests: Shot put: 21.29, Des Moines, 2013

Justin Rodhe (born October 17, 1984) is an American born Canadian shot putter.

Born in Bainbridge, Ohio, Rodhe moved to Canada in 2008 and became a Canadian citizen on November 1, 2011. The change of citizenship made him ineligible for the 2012 world indoor track and field championships and jeopardized his chance of competing for Canada at the 2012 Summer Olympics. An International Association of Athletics Federations rule requires an athlete be a citizen for two years before representing a country internationally; this would have made him ineligible until 2013, but an appeal by Athletics Canada was successful, and he competed in the shot put event for Canada; throwing three foot fouls.

== Achievements ==
- Lawrence Meeting, Kansas City – third place (April 18, 2012)
- Personal best: 21.29 metres (2013 IAAF season)
