= Tim Nedow =

Canadian track and field athlete (born 1990)

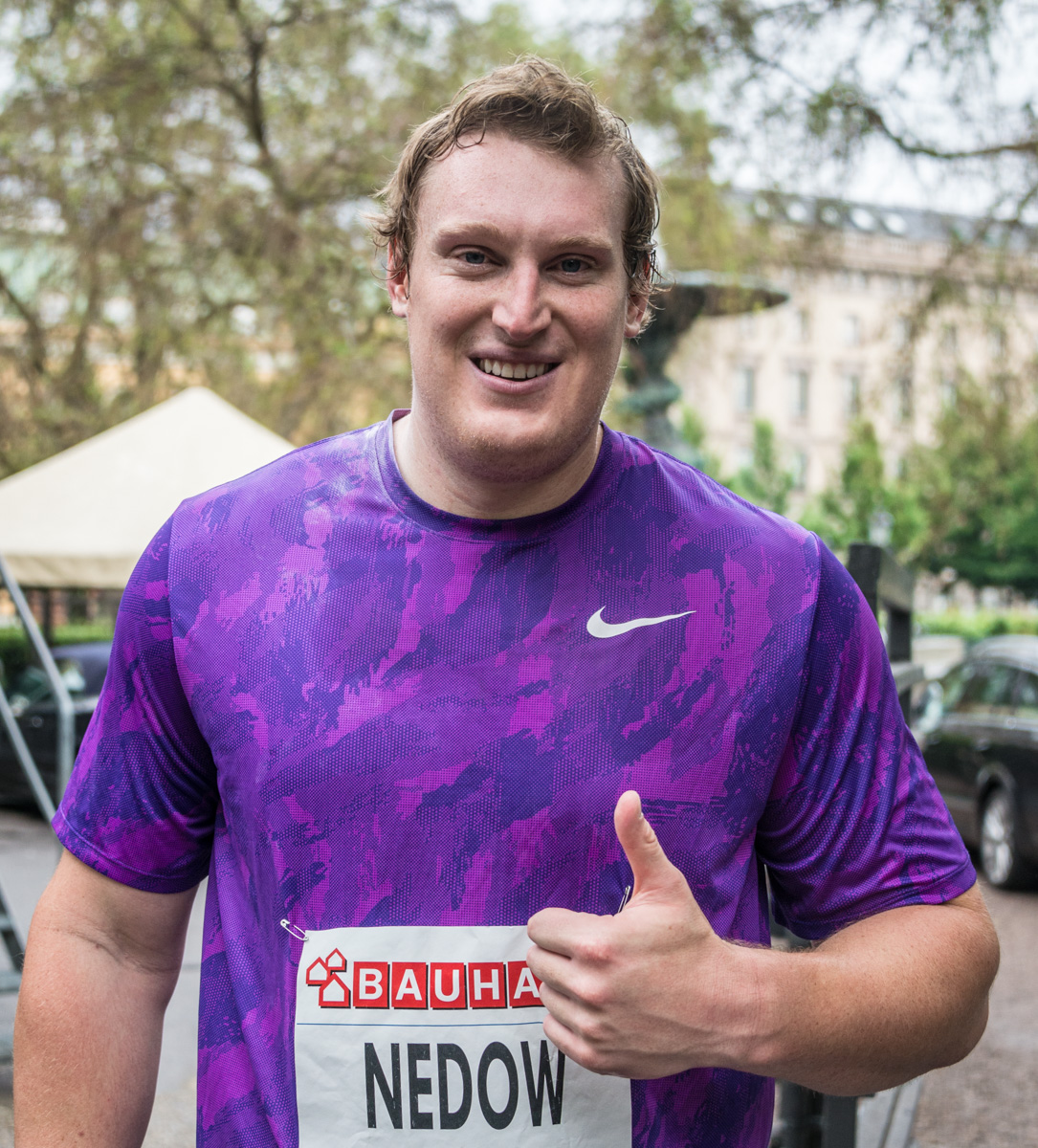
- Nedow in 2015

Personal information
- Full name: Timothy Nedow
- Born: October 16, 1990 (age 36) Brockville, Canada
- Height: 1.95 m (6 ft 5 in)
- Weight: 140 kg (309 lb) (2014)

Sport
- Sport: Athletics
- Event: Shot put

Achievements and titles
- Personal bests: Outdoor: 21.02, Toronto 2018; Indoor: 21.33, Stockholm 2016
Medal record
Men's athletics
Representing Canada
North American, Central American and Caribbean Championships
Silver medal – second place	2018 Toronto	Shot put
Pan American Games
Silver medal – second place	2015 Toronto	Shot put
Commonwealth Games
Bronze medal – third place	2014 Glasgow	Shot put
Bronze medal – third place	2018 Gold Coast	Shot put
Francophonie Games
Bronze medal – third place	2013 Nice	Shot put

Timothy "Tim" Nedow (born October 16, 1990) is a Canadian track and field athlete who competes in the shot put and discus throw. He has personal bests of 21.33 m (69 ft 11 3/4 in) in the shot put and 61.49 m (201 ft 8 3/4 in) in the discus throw. He was the bronze medalist at the 2014 Commonwealth Games and the 2013 Francophonie Games and a five-time champion of the Canadian Track and Field Championships (2011 discus, both shot put and discus in 2013 and 2014). He has also competed at the World Championships in Athletics, in 2013, and twice at the Summer Universiade. He studied and competed athletically at the University of Tulsa and DePaul University.

== Career ==
=== Early life ===
Born in Brockville to Jim and Wendy Nedow, he was initially a versatile athlete, competing in the high jump, basketball, shot put and triple jump. He grew quickly in his teenage years and reached 1.95 m (6 ft 5 in). He switched to focus on throwing events in his late teens and was the Canadian junior (under-20) champion in the shot put. He attended Thousand Islands Secondary School before going on to major in arts and sciences at the University of Tulsa. He competed collegiately for the Tulsa Golden Hurricane and in his first season won the Conference USA title in the discus with a throw of 49.79 m (163 ft 4 in) – the second best ever mark by a Tulsa college athlete. His international debut for Canada came at the 2009 Pan American Junior Athletics Championships, where he set a personal record of 19.00 m (62 ft 4 in) to take the bronze medal in the junior implement shot put.

=== DePaul University ===
Nedow changed college after his first year and began studying at DePaul University, gaining a place on their DePaul Blue Demons track team. There he worked under coach Dave Dopek, a former NCAA indoor champion. He was third in the shot put at the Big East Conference indoor meet. Outdoors he was fourth in the shot put and sixth in the discus at the Big East Championships, then was a finalist at the NCAA Men's Outdoor Track and Field Championship. He ended the season with bests of 17.90 m (58 ft 8 1/2 in) for the shot put and 53.89 m (176 ft 9 1/2 in) for the discus. He was a much improved athlete in 2011 and threw a personal record of 19.18 m (62 ft 11 in) in January. He won the Big East shot put titles indoors and out, as well as a fourth-place finish in the discus throw at the outdoor meet. His appearance at the NCAA Men's Indoor Track and Field Championship broke a nine-year absence for DePaul University, although Nedow failed to record a valid mark. He placed in the top twenty of both throws at the 2011 NCAA Outdoor meet. He began to establish himself at national level, coming second in the shot put at the Canadian Track and Field Championships. He made his second international appearance through the Summer Universiade and he finished twelfth at the event in Shenzhen, China.

Nedow opened his 2012 indoor season with seven straight shot put wins, including a school record of 20.51 m (67 ft 3 1/4 in) to retain the Big East title. At the NCAA Indoor Championships he was two metres shorter, ended the competition in thirteenth. Outdoor personal bests followed at the Drake Relays where he won both his throwing specialities with a mark of 19.69 m (64 ft 7 in) in the shot and 58.30 m (191 ft 3 1/4 in) in the discus. He improved his discus best at the Big East Outdoor Championships, winning his first title in the event with a best of 58.60 m (192 ft 3 in). He was below-par in the shot put, however, coming in second place with a sub-18-metre throw. He preceded the 2012 Canadian Championships in a discus best of 59.24 m (194 ft 4 1/4 in) and went on to win his first national title in the event that June. In the shot put, he placed third with a new best of 20.21 m (66 ft 3 1/2 in) behind the more established Dylan Armstrong and Justin Rodhe. He did not qualify for the 2012 Olympics as he did not have the "A" standard, but he represented his country at the 2012 NACAC Under-23 Championships in Athletics, coming fourth in the shot and sixth in the discus.

=== Professional career ===
Nedow turned professional after finishing university and began to train with fellow Canadian thrower Dylan Armstrong and his coach Anatoliy Bondarchuk. He threw a shot put best of 20.74 m (68 ft 1/2 in) in April then went on to complete a shot put/discus double at the 2013 Canadian Championships. He failed to register a mark at the 2013 Universiade, but was selected for the shot put 2013 World Championships in Athletics (his first senior global event) and competed in the first round only. He ended the year with a bronze medal performance in the shot put at the Francophonie Games.

He added to his personal best in the shot put at the beginning of 2014, throwing 20.98 m (68 ft 9 3/4 in) in La Jolla, California. He won both shot put and discus titles at the 2014 Canadian Championships. This earned him a place at the 2014 Commonwealth Games. A put of 20.59 m (67 ft 6 1/2 in) in the final of that competition brought him the bronze medal.

Nedow has qualified to compete at the 2020 Summer Olympics.

== Personal bests ==
- Shot put – 20.98 m (68 ft 9 3/4 in) (2014)
  - Indoor – 21.33 m (69 ft 11 3/4 in) (2016)
- Discus throw – 61.49 m (201 ft 8 3/4 in) (2015)
