= 2019 European Throwing Cup =

- Dates: 9–10 March
- Host city: Šamorín, Slovakia
- Venue: Šamorín x-bionic® sphere
- Events: 16
- Participation: 329 athletes from 38 nations

The 2019 European Throwing Cup was hold on 9–10 March in Šamorín, Slovakia. It is the 19th edition of the athletics competition for throwing events and was jointly organised by the European Athletic Association. The competition featured men's and women's contests in shot put, discus throw, javelin throw and hammer throw. In addition to the senior competitions, there were also under-23 events for younger athletes.

== Medal summary ==
=== Senior ===
Men
Event	Gold		Silver		Bronze	
Shot put	Francisco Belo (POR)	20.97 m PB=	Maksim Afonin (ANA)	20.61 m	Bob Bertemes (LUX)	20.55 m
Discus throw	Philip Milanov (BEL)	62.63 m	Christoph Harting (GER)	62.61 m SB	Martin Kupper (EST)	62.11 m
Hammer throw	Quentin Bigot (FRA)	78.14 m WL	Mihaíl Anastasákis (GRE)	76.38 m	Yevgeniy Korotovskiy (ANA)	76.33 m
Javelin throw	Matija Kranjc (SLO)	76.17 m SB	Norbert Rivasz-Tóth (HUN)	76.11 m	Mauro Fraresso (ITA)	75.00 m

Women
Event	Gold		Silver		Bronze	
Shot put	Fanny Roos (SWE)	18.44 m	Dimitriana Surdu (MDA)	17.99 m	Anita Márton (HUN)	17.85 m
Discus throw	Shanice Craft (GER)	59.79 m	Nadine Müller (GER)	59.74 m	Irina Rodrigues (POR)	58.05 m
Hammer throw	Hanna Malyshik (BLR)	74.95 m WL	Joanna Fiodorow (POL)	73.22 m	Iryna Klymets (UKR)	72.53 m SB
Javelin throw	Tatsiana Khaladovich (BLR)	65.89 m WL	Christin Hussong (GER)	65.47 m	Eda Tugsuz (TUR)	64.83 m SB

=== Under-23 ===
Under-23 men
Event	Gold		Silver		Bronze	
Shot put	Giorgi Mujaridze (GEO)	20.27 m CR	Aleh Tamashevich (BLR)	19.38 m	Alperen Karahan (TUR)	18.47 m PB
Discus throw	Kristjan Čeh (SLO)	62.90 m NUR	Yauheni Bahutski (BLR)	61.28 m PB	Ruslan Valitov (UKR)	55.93 m
Hammer throw	Mykhaylo Kokhan (UKR)	76.68 m PB	Bence Halász (HUN)	75.41 m SB	Aliaksandr Shymanovich (BLR)	72.36 m
Javelin throw	Aliaksei Katkavets (BLR)	82.45 m WL	Cyprian Mrzygłód (POL)	79.41 m	Alexandru Novac (ROU)	78.74 m SB

Under-23 women
Event	Gold		Silver		Bronze	
Shot put	Jorinde van Klinken (NED)	16.38 m	Violetta Veiland (HUN)	15.81 m	Ashley Bologna (FRA)	15.50 m
Discus throw	Marija Tolj (CRO)	57.76 m	Vanessa Kamga (SWE)	57.73 m	Jorinde van Klinken (NED)	55.86 m
Hammer throw	Sofiya Palkina (ANA)	69.18 m	Nastassia Maslava (BLR)	68.13 m	Beatrice Nedberge Llano (NOR)	67.89 m NUR
Javelin throw	Sara Zabarino (ITA)	58.62 m NUR	Aliaksandra Konshyna (BLR)	55.27 m	Géraldine Ruckstuhl (SUI)	53.50 m NUR

=== Medal table ===
* Host nation (Slovakia)

Rank	Nation	Gold	Silver	Bronze	Total
1	Belarus (BLR)	3	4	1	8
2	Slovenia (SLO)	2	0	0	2
3	Germany (GER)	1	3	0	4
–	Authorised Neutral Athletes (ANA)	1	1	1	3
4	Sweden (SWE)	1	1	0	2
5	Ukraine (UKR)	1	0	2	3
6	France (FRA)	1	0	1	2
6	Italy (ITA)	1	0	1	2
6	Netherlands (NED)	1	0	1	2
6	Portugal (POR)	1	0	1	2
10	Belgium (BEL)	1	0	0	1
10	Croatia (CRO)	1	0	0	1
10	Georgia (GEO)	1	0	0	1
13	Hungary (HUN)	0	3	1	4
14	Poland (POL)	0	2	0	2
15	Greece (GRE)	0	1	0	1
15	Moldova (MDA)	0	1	0	1
17	Turkey (TUR)	0	0	2	2
18	Estonia (EST)	0	0	1	1
18	Luxembourg (LUX)	0	0	1	1
18	Norway (NOR)	0	0	1	1
18	Romania (ROU)	0	0	1	1
18	Switzerland (SUI)	0	0	1	1
Totals (22 entries)		16	16	16	48

== Teams Standings ==
=== Senior men ===
Rank	Team	Points
1st place, gold medalist(s)	Poland	4263
2nd place, silver medalist(s)	Italy	4255
3rd place, bronze medalist(s)	Ukraine	4191
4	France	4128
5	Turkey	4052
6	Romania	3989
7	Belarus	3570

=== Senior women ===
Rank	Team	Points
1st place, gold medalist(s)	Germany	4326
2nd place, silver medalist(s)	Belarus	4312
3rd place, bronze medalist(s)	Poland	4269
4	Ukraine	4120
5	Hungary	4020
6	Turkey	4009
7	France	3970
8	Italy	3947

=== Under-23 men ===
Rank	Team	Points
1st place, gold medalist(s)	Belarus	4380
2nd place, silver medalist(s)	Ukraine	4104
3rd place, bronze medalist(s)	France	3973
4	Romania	3899
5	Italy	3883
6	Hungary	3857
7	Portugal	3775
8	Turkey	3686

=== Under-23 women ===
Rank	Team	Points
1st place, gold medalist(s)	Ukraine	3689
2nd place, silver medalist(s)	Poland	3685
3rd place, bronze medalist(s)	Belarus	3615
4	Turkey	3575
5	France	3536
6	Ireland	3419

== Results ==
=== Men ===
==== Shot put (senior) ====
Rank	Athlete	Result	Note	1	2	3	4	5	6
1st place, gold medalist(s)	Francisco Belo (POR)	20.97	PB	19.60	20.23	20.97	20.89	X	20.36
2nd place, silver medalist(s)	Maksim Afonin (ANA)	20.61		X	20.60	X	20.02	19.87	20.61
3rd place, bronze medalist(s)	Bob Bertemes (LUX)	20.55		19.59	X	X	20.55	X	X
4	Jakub Szyszkowski (POL)	20.14		18.99	19.82	X	20.14	20.14	19.77
5	Leonardo Fabbri (ITA)	20.02		19.60	X	20.02	19.78	X	19.73
6	Carlos Tobalina (ESP)	19.69		19.57	19.69	19.11	X	19.37	19.40
7	Andrei Gag (ROU)	19.29		18.55	18.85	19.29	X	X	R
8	Tsanko Arnaudov (POR)	19.07		X	19.07	X	X	X	X
9	Aliaksei Nichypar (BLR)	18.93		18.57	18.74	18.90	18.91	18.58	18.93
10	Frederic Dagee (FRA)	18.59		X	X	X	X	X	18.59

=== Women ===
==== Javelin throw (senior) ====
Rank	Athlete	Result	Note	1	2	3	4	5	6
1st place, gold medalist(s)	Tatsiana Khaladovich (Belarus)	65.89	WL	62.98	62.14	63.07	X	60.62	65.89
2nd place, silver medalist(s)	Christin Hussong (Germany)	65.47		61.42	62.92	65.47	X	62.32	60.85
3rd place, bronze medalist(s)	Eda Tugsuz (Turkey)	64.83	SB	62.45	62.49	64.83	61.15	X	X
4	Sigrid Borge (Norway)	62.20		56.53	55.80	62.20	X	56.91	55.56
5	Maria Andrejczyk (POL)	60.56		57.12	53.23	57.86	56.19	60.56	57.31
6	Victoria Hudson (AUT)	59.98	SB	53.81	54.03	52.29	59.98	X	57.12
7	Hanna Hatsko-Fedusova (UKR)	59.13	SB	55.58	58.16	59.13	57.71	X	58.69
8	Sara Jemai (ITA)	57.17	SB	X	57.17	54.68	X	X	57.14
9	Carolina Visca (ITA)	56.36		55.57	53.77	X	56.30	56.01	56.36

==== Javelin throw (under-23) ====
Rank	Athlete	Result	Note	1	2	3	4	5	6
1st place, gold medalist(s)	Sara Zabarino (ITA)	58.62	PB NUR	54.01	58.62	54.32	53.30	54.63	51.63
2nd place, silver medalist(s)	Aliaksandra Konshyna (BLR)	55.27		50.79	55.27	48.65	49.83	X	X
3rd place, bronze medalist(s)	Géraldine Ruckstuhl (SUI)	53.50	NUR	47.18	48.50	50.87	49.11	53.50	47.37
4	Evelina Mendes (FRA)	53.37		50.52	51.28	53.37	51.13	X	47.13
5	Zoja Šušteršič (SLO)	51.56	PB	49.43	51.56	X	X	51.41	50.59
6	Alina Shukh (UKR)	51.49		X	51.49	48.44	50.28	X	47.05
7	Mali Ingeborg Vollan Marstad (NOR)	50.92		50.57	46.35	X	50.65	50.92	X
8	Emma Hamplett (GBR)	50.88		46.47	49.57	50.88	50.35	X	50.23
