= 2018 European Athletics Championships – Men's shot put =

Men's shot put at the 2018 European Athletics Championships
- Venue: Olympic Stadium
- Location: Berlin
- Dates: August 6 (qualification); August 7 (final)
- Competitors: 30 from 23 nations
- Winning distance: 21.72

Medalists
gold medal	Michał Haratyk	Poland
silver medal	Konrad Bukowiecki	Poland
bronze medal	David Storl	Germany

The men's shot put at the 2018 European Athletics Championships took place at the Olympic Stadium on 6 and 7 August. The qualifications took place at a temporary venue at Breitscheidplatz.

== Records ==
Standing records prior to the 2018 European Athletics Championships
World record	Randy Barnes (USA)	23.12 m	Los Angeles, United States	20 May 1990
European record	Ulf Timmermann (GDR)	23.06 m	Chania, Greece	22 May 1988
Championship record	Werner Günthör (SUI)	22.22 m	Stuttgart, West Germany	28 August 1986
World Leading	Tomas Walsh (NZL)	22.67 m	Auckland, New Zealand	25 March 2018
Europe Leading	Michał Haratyk (POL)	22.08 m	Ostrava, Czech Republic	13 June 2018

== Schedule ==
Date	Time	Round
6 August 2018	17:35	Qualification
7 August 2018	20:33	Final

All times are local times (UTC+2)

== Results ==
=== Qualification ===
Qualification: 20.40 m (Q) or best 12 performers (q)

Rank	Group	Name	Nationality	#1	#2	#3	Result	Note
1	B	David Storl	Germany	20.63			20.63	Q
2	B	Stipe Žunić	Croatia	20.61			20.61	Q
3	B	Michał Haratyk	Poland	20.59			20.59	Q
4	B	Aleksandr Lesnoy	Authorised Neutral Athletes	19.36	20.47		20.47	Q
5	A	Maksim Afonin	Authorised Neutral Athletes	20.04	20.33	20.15	20.33	q
6	B	Nicholas Scarvelis	Greece	19.91	19.73	20.24	20.24	q, SB
7	A	Mesud Pezer	Bosnia and Herzegovina	19.57	19.96	20.16	20.16	q
8	A	Aliaksei Nichypar	Belarus	19.97	x	19.90	19.97	q
9	B	Tsanko Arnaudov	Portugal	18.96	19.89	x	19.89	q
10	A	Konrad Bukowiecki	Poland	17.73	19.89	x	19.89	q
11	B	Tomáš Staněk	Czech Republic	x	19.77	19.76	19.77	q
12	A	Bob Bertemes	Luxembourg	19.70	19.64	x	19.70	q
13	A	Jakub Szyszkowski	Poland	19.05	19.24	19.67	19.67	
14	A	Francisco Belo	Portugal	18.83	19.66	x	19.66	
15	A	Ihor Musiyenko	Ukraine	18.65	18.59	19.61	19.61	
16	B	Marcus Thomsen	Norway	19.44	19.59	19.58	19.59	
17	A	Frederic Dagee	France	x	19.56	19.55	19.56	
18	A	Carlos Tobalina	Spain	18.50	18.77	19.41	19.41	
19	B	Georgi Ivanov	Bulgaria	17.79	19.40	19.09	19.40	SB
20	B	Hamza Alić	Bosnia and Herzegovina	19.30	19.34	x	19.34	
21	A	Tomaš Đurović	Montenegro	18.96	18.92	19.33	19.33	
22	A	Filip Mihaljević	Croatia	x	19.32	x	19.32	
23	B	Andrei Gag	Romania	19.26	x	18.47	19.26	
24	B	Giorgi Mujaridze	Georgia	19.18	x	x	19.18	
25	B	Blaž Zupančič	Slovenia	18.65	x	18.83	18.83	
26	A	Osman Can Özdeveci	Turkey	18.22	18.60	18.77	18.77	
27	A	Kemal Mešić	Bosnia and Herzegovina	x	x	18.70	18.70	
28	B	Arttu Kangas	Finland	x	x	18.17	18.17	
29	A	Leonardo Fabbri	Italy	18.04	x	x	18.04	
	B	Asmir Kolašinac	Serbia	x	x	x	NM	

=== Final ===
Rank	Athlete	Nationality	#1	#2	#3	#4	#5	#6	Result	Notes
1st place, gold medalist(s)	Michał Haratyk	Poland	20.94	21.72	x	21.50	x	21.66	21.72	
2nd place, silver medalist(s)	Konrad Bukowiecki	Poland	20.01	21.66	20.96	x	x	20.84	21.66	NU23R
3rd place, bronze medalist(s)	David Storl	Germany	21.41	x	x	21.34	x	x	21.41	
4	Tomáš Staněk	Czech Republic	20.56	21.16	x	x	x	21.15	21.16	
5	Aleksandr Lesnoy	Authorised Neutral Athletes	20.10	x	20.38	20.57	21.04	20.80	21.04	
6	Bob Bertemes	Luxembourg	20.55	21.00	19.82	20.07	x	19.81	21.00	NR
7	Stipe Žunić	Croatia	20.24	20.73	x	x	x	x	20.73	
8	Maksim Afonin	Authorised Neutral Athletes	x	19.59	20.38	20.68	20.06	x	20.68	
9	Tsanko Arnaudov	Portugal	19.93	20.05	20.33				20.33	
10	Aliaksei Nichypar	Belarus	19.35	19.98	20.27				20.27	
11	Nicholas Scarvelis	Greece	19.63	20.11	x				20.11	
12	Mesud Pezer	Bosnia and Herzegovina	19.91	x	19.80				19.91	
