= 2013 European Athletics U23 Championships – Men's shot put =

The Men's shot put event at the 2013 European Athletics U23 Championships was held in Tampere, Finland, at Ratina Stadium on 11 July.

== Medalists ==
Gold	Jakub Szyszkowski; Poland
Silver	Dominik Witczak; Poland
Bronze	Mikhal Abramchuk; Belarus

== Results ==
=== Final ===
11 July 2013

Rank	Name	Nationality	Attempts						Result	Notes
Rank	Name	Nationality	1	2	3	4	5	6	Result	Notes
1st place, gold medalist(s)	Jakub Szyszkowski	Poland	19.07	18.76	19.48	19.49	19.27	19.78	19.78	
2nd place, silver medalist(s)	Dominik Witczak	Poland	19.10	18.54	19.33	18.61	19.63	x	19.63	PB
3rd place, bronze medalist(s)	Mikhal Abramchuk	Belarus	19.19	18.58	18.96	18.74	19.42	x	19.42	
4	Zane Duquemin	United Kingdom	19.19	x	x	18.51	18.26	19.17	19.19	PB
5	Tomáš Staněk	Czech Republic	18.85	x	x	19.18	x	x	19.18	
6	Martin Novák	Czech Republic	17.77	18.87	x	18.83	18.98	18.83	18.98	
7	Arttu Kangas	Finland	x	x	18.24	18.94	x	x	18.94	PB
8	Šarūnas Banevičius	Lithuania	18.14	18.57	18.75	x	x	18.47	18.75	
9	Maksim Afonin	Russia	x	18.15	18.18				18.18	
10	Aliaksei Nichypar	Belarus	x	x	17.69				17.69	
11	Lukas Weißhaidinger	Austria	x	x	17.42				17.42	
	Christian Jagusch	Germany	x	x	x				NM	

=== Qualifications ===
Qualified: qualifying perf. 18.70 (Q) or 12 best performers (q) advance to the Final

==== Summary ====
Rank	Name	Nationality	Result	Notes
1	Dominik Witczak	Poland	18.91	Q
2	Mikhal Abramchuk	Belarus	18.79	Q
3	Martin Novák	Czech Republic	18.76	Q
4	Šarūnas Banevičius	Lithuania	18.69	q
5	Jakub Szyszkowski	Poland	18.55	q
6	Tomáš Staněk	Czech Republic	18.53	q
7	Lukas Weißhaidinger	Austria	18.50	q
8	Arttu Kangas	Finland	18.42	q
9	Christian Jagusch	Germany	18.28	q
10	Maksim Afonin	Russia	18.19	q
11	Zane Duquemin	United Kingdom	18.11	q
12	Aliaksei Nichypar	Belarus	18.07	q
13	Bob Bertemes	Luxembourg	17.94	
14	Jan Josef Jeuschede	Germany	17.83	
15	Ivan Mikhalchuk	Belarus	17.68	
16	Francisco Belo	Portugal	17.63	
17	Alejandro Noguera	Spain	17.59	
18	Daniele Secci	Italy	17.56	
19	Jacek Wiśniewski	Poland	17.47	
20	Matus Olej	Slovakia	17.42	
21	Marius Šilenskis	Lithuania	17.35	
22	Tsanko Arnaudov	Portugal	17.14	
23	Itamar Levi	Israel	16.93	
24	Murat Gündüz	Turkey	16.76	
25	Mantas Jusis	Lithuania	16.45	
26	Tommaso Parolo	Italy	15.82	
	Luka Mustafić	Croatia	NM	
	Mehmet Yarimay	Turkey	NM	
	Danijel Furtula	Montenegro	DNS	

==== Details ====
===== Group A =====
11 July 2013 / 10:20

Rank	Name	Nationality	Attempts			Result	Notes
Rank	Name	Nationality	1	2	3	Result	Notes
1	Dominik Witczak	Poland	17.46	18.91		18.91	Q
2	Mikhal Abramchuk	Belarus	18.79			18.79	Q
3	Martin Novák	Czech Republic	18.76			18.76	Q
4	Šarūnas Banevičius	Lithuania	18.67	18.69	x	18.69	q
5	Arttu Kangas	Finland	x	18.14	18.42	18.42	q
6	Maksim Afonin	Russia	17.53	18.19	18.06	18.19	q
7	Jan Josef Jeuschede	Germany	17.83	x	17.82	17.83	
8	Ivan Mikhalchuk	Belarus	17.55	17.68	17.35	17.68	
9	Francisco Belo	Portugal	16.79	17.63	x	17.63	
10	Marius Šilenskis	Lithuania	x	17.35	x	17.35	
11	Tommaso Parolo	Italy	15.71	15.82	x	15.82	
	Luka Mustafić	Croatia	x	x	x	NM	
	Mehmet Yarimay	Turkey	x	x	-	NM	
	Danijel Furtula	Montenegro				DNS	

===== Group B =====
11 July 2013 / 10:20

Rank	Name	Nationality	Attempts			Result	Notes
Rank	Name	Nationality	1	2	3	Result	Notes
1	Jakub Szyszkowski	Poland	18.28	18.14	18.55	18.55	q
2	Tomáš Staněk	Czech Republic	18.02	18.53	-	18.53	q
3	Lukas Weißhaidinger	Austria	18.50	x	18.43	18.50	q
4	Christian Jagusch	Germany	17.01	18.28	17.77	18.28	q
5	Zane Duquemin	United Kingdom	18.11	x	18.09	18.11	q
6	Aliaksei Nichypar	Belarus	x	17.39	18.07	18.07	q
7	Bob Bertemes	Luxembourg	16.62	17.72	17.94	17.94	
8	Alejandro Noguera	Spain	17.07	x	17.59	17.59	
9	Daniele Secci	Italy	17.56	17.39	x	17.56	
10	Jacek Wiśniewski	Poland	x	17.47	x	17.47	
11	Matus Olej	Slovakia	16.58	16.92	17.42	17.42	
12	Tsanko Arnaudov	Portugal	16.62	17.14	x	17.14	
13	Itamar Levi	Israel	16.75	x	16.93	16.93	
14	Murat Gündüz	Turkey	16.66	16.76	16.70	16.76	
15	Mantas Jusis	Lithuania	x	16.34	16.45	16.45	

== Participation ==
According to an unofficial count, 28 athletes from 17 countries participated in the event.

- Austria (1)
- Belarus (3)
- Croatia (1)
- Czech Republic (2)
- Finland (1)
- Germany (2)
- Israel (1)
- Italy (2)
- Lithuania (3)
- Luxembourg (1)
- Poland (3)
- Portugal (2)
- Russia (1)
- Slovakia (1)
- Spain (1)
- Turkey (2)
- United Kingdom (1)
