= 2019 European Athletics Indoor Championships – Men's shot put =

The men's shot put event at the 2019 European Athletics Indoor Championships was held on 1 March at 11:30 (qualification) and at 20:35 (final) local time.

== Medalists ==
Gold	Silver	Bronze
Michał Haratyk; Poland	David Storl; Germany	Tomáš Staněk; Czech Republic

== Records ==
Standing records prior to the 2019 European Athletics Indoor Championships
World record	Randy Barnes (USA)	22.66	Los Angeles, United States	20 January 1989
European record	Ulf Timmermann (GDR)	22.55	Senftenberg, East Germany	11 February 1989
Championship record	Ulf Timmermann (GDR)	22.19	Liévin, France	21 February 1987
World Leading	Ryan Crouser (USA)	22.33	New York City, United States	9 February 2019
European Leading	David Storl (GER)	21.32	Leipzig, Germany	16 February 2019

== Results ==
=== Qualification ===
Qualification: Qualifying performance 20.90 (Q) or at least 8 best performers (q) advance to the Final

Rank	Athlete	Nationality	#1	#2	#3	Result	Note
1	Mesud Pezer	Bosnia and Herzegovina	20.22	20.32	21.08	21.08	Q, SB
2	Michał Haratyk	Poland	20.16	20.51	20.98	20.98	Q, SB
3	Bob Bertemes	Luxembourg	20.49	x	20.97	20.97	Q
4	Tomáš Staněk	Czech Republic	20.90			20.90	Q
5	David Storl	Germany	20.13	20.58	20.61	20.61	q
6	Marcus Thomsen	Norway	20.30	20.41	20.41	20.41	q, NU23R
7	Nikolaos Skarvelis	Greece	19.70	20.34	20.30	20.34	q, SB
8	Francisco Belo	Portugal	19.93	20.31	20.15	20.31	q
9	Maksim Afonin	Authorised Neutral Athletes	20.30	20.14	x	20.30	
10	Jakub Szyszkowski	Poland	20.28	20.24	19.85	20.28	
11	Konrad Bukowiecki	Poland	19.60	x	20.18	20.18	
12	Tsanko Arnaudov	Portugal	19.86	x	19.08	19.86	
13	Asmir Kolašinac	Serbia	19.46	19.82	19.45	19.82	
14	Leonardo Fabbri	Italy	19.60	x	19.71	19.71	
15	Andrei Gag	Romania	19.70	x	19.31	19.70	
16	Giorgi Mujaridze	Georgia	18.24	19.20	19.46	19.46	
17	Osman Can Özdeveci	Turkey	19.13	x	x	19.13	PB
18	Carlos Tobalina	Spain	17.11	18.66	19.06	19.06	

=== Final ===
Rank	Athlete	Nationality	#1	#2	#3	#4	#5	#6	Result	Note
1st place, gold medalist(s)	Michał Haratyk	Poland	21.65 EL	21.33	21.43	X	X	X	21.65	PB
2nd place, silver medalist(s)	David Storl	Germany	21.16	21.54	X	X	X	20.57	21.54	SB
3rd place, bronze medalist(s)	Tomáš Staněk	Czech Republic	X	21.25	20.37	X	X	20.30	21.25	SB
4	Francisco Belo	Portugal	20.59	20.97	20.65	20.56	X	X	20.97	PB
5	Bob Bertemes	Luxembourg	X	X	20.70	X	X	20.60	20.70	
6	Mesud Pezer	Bosnia and Herzegovina	20.10	X	20.29	20.69	20.44	20.67	20.69	
7	Marcus Thomsen	Norway	19.65	20.21	19.98	20.22	19.90	20.09	20.22	
8	Nikolaos Skarvelis	Greece	19.49	19.87	19.68	X	19.92	20.13	20.13	
