= Track and field at the 2015 Military World Games – Men's shot put =

Military World Games Competition

The men's shot put event at the 2015 Military World Games was held on 6 October at the KAFAC Sports Complex.

== Records ==
Prior to this competition, the existing world and CISM record were as follows:

World Record	Randy Barnes (USA)	23.12	Westwood, United States	20 May 1990
CISM World Record	Paolo Dal Soglio (ITA)	20.39	Zagreb, Croatia	August 1999

== Schedule ==
Date	Time	Round
6 October 2015	14:00	Final

== Medalists ==
Gold	Silver	Bronze
Darlan Romani; Brazil	Bob Bertemes; Luxembourg	Georgi Ivanov; Bulgaria

== Results ==
=== Final ===
Rank	Athlete	Nationality	#1	#2	#3	#4	#5	#6	Mark	Notes
1st place, gold medalist(s)	Darlan Romani	Brazil	20.08	x	19.46	x	x	19.46	20.08	
2nd place, silver medalist(s)	Bob Bertemes	Luxembourg	18.93	19.00	19.60	x	19.58	19.36	19.60	
3rd place, bronze medalist(s)	Georgi Ivanov	Bulgaria	x	18.20	19.21	19.37	x	x	19.37	
4	Tian Zizhong	China	18.80	18.93	19.13	18.77	x	18.59	19.13	
5	Sultan Al-Hebshi	Saudi Arabia	17.86	x	18.42	18.35	19.04	x	19.04	
6	Jakub Szyszkowski	Poland	17.96	17.59	17.36	18.33	x	18.93	18.93	
7	Anton Tikhomirov	Russia	17.83	18.09	x	18.10	18.69	x	18.69	
8	Musab Momani	Jordan	17.78	17.79	17.79	17.48	x	x	17.79	
9	Arttu Kangas	Finland	17.74	x	17.78				17.78	
10	Ronald Julião	Brazil	14.88	x	15.10				15.10	
	Pethias Barclays Gondwe Mdoka	Malawi							DNS	
	Emmanuel Chimdzeka	Malawi							DNS	
	Jili Wen	China							DNS	
