= 2015 European Athletics U23 Championships – Men's shot put =

The men's shot put event at the 2015 European Athletics U23 Championships was held in Tallinn, Estonia, at Kadriorg Stadium on 12 July.

== Medalists ==
Gold	Filip Mihaljević; Croatia
Silver	Bob Bertemes; Luxembourg
Bronze	Andrzej Regin; Poland

== Results ==
=== Final ===
12 July

Rank	Name	Nationality	Attempts						Result	Notes
Rank	Name	Nationality	1	2	3	4	5	6	Result	Notes
1st place, gold medalist(s)	Filip Mihaljević	Croatia	x	18.60	x	18.85	x	19.35	19.35	
2nd place, silver medalist(s)	Bob Bertemes	Luxembourg	17.95	18.98	18.80	x	19.29	x	19.29	
3rd place, bronze medalist(s)	Andrzej Regin	Poland	18.38	18.26	18.74	18.76	19.08	18.99	19.08	PB
4	Mesud Pezer	Bosnia and Herzegovina	18.22	18.85	18.98	x	18.78	18.59	18.98	
5	Dennis Lewke	Germany	18.80	18.91	18.97	18.83	18.69	x	18.97	
6	Nikólaos Skarvéli	Greece	x	x	18.56	18.83	x	18.96	18.96	
7	Jaromír Mazgal	Czech Republic	18.37	18.39	18.53	18.61	18.67	18.78	18.78	PB
8	Bodo Göder	Germany	18.26	18.40	x	18.74	x	x	18.74	
9	Arttu Kangas	Finland	x	x	18.27				18.27	
10	Krzysztof Brzozowski	Poland	18.16	x	x				18.16	
11	Jan Josef Jeuschede	Germany	x	17.98	x				17.98	
12	Aliaksei Nichypor	Belarus	x	x	17.84				17.84	

=== Qualifications ===
12 July

Rank	Name	Nationality	Attempts			Result	Notes
Rank	Name	Nationality	1	2	3	Result	Notes
1	Filip Mihaljević	Croatia	18.38	x	19.16	19.16	Q
2	Nikólaos Skarvéli	Greece	18.65	17.71	18.87	18.87	q
3	Jaromír Mazgal	Czech Republic	18.69	–	–	18.69	PB q
4	Bodo Göder	Germany	17.73	18.08	18.62	18.62	q
5	Mesud Pezer	Bosnia and Herzegovina	x	18.15	18.54	18.54	q
6	Andrzej Regin	Poland	17.96	18.11	18.49	18.49	q
7	Dennis Lewke	Germany	18.47	x	18.16	18.47	q
8	Bob Bertemes	Luxembourg	x	x	18.41	18.41	q
9	Arttu Kangas	Finland	x	18.15	18.31	18.31	q
10	Jan Josef Jeuschede	Germany	18.28	x	17.45	18.28	q
11	Aliaksei Nichypor	Belarus	16.68	x	18.27	18.27	q
12	Krzysztof Brzozowski	Poland	x	16.88	18.05	18.05	q
13	Timo Kööpikkä	Finland	x	17.16	17.80	17.80	
14	Dawid Krzyżan	Poland	17.70	x	17.05	17.70	
15	Osman Can Özdeveci	Turkey	17.32	17.48	17.65	17.65	
16	Alejandro Noguera	Spain	x	17.64	17.42	17.64	
17	Nicolai Ceban	Moldova	17.10	16.64	17.63	17.63	
18	Demir Kolarević	Croatia	16.77	17.36	17.02	17.36	
19	Tomaš Đurović	Montenegro	16.83	17.31	17.13	17.31	
20	Gian Piero Ragonesi	Italy	16.22	17.21	17.04	17.21	
21	Stefán Velemir	Iceland	17.17	x	x	17.17	
22	Blaž Zupančič	Slovenia	17.09	16.86	16.78	17.09	
23	Denzel Comenentia	Netherlands	x	x	17.04	17.04	
24	Julius Malotkinas	Lithuania	16.82	16.57	16.93	16.93	
25	Karl Koha	Estonia	16.16	x	16.51	16.51	
26	Murat Gündüz	Turkey	15.55	x	16.37	16.37	
	Péter Simon	Hungary	x	x	x	NM	

== Participation ==
According to an unofficial count, 27 athletes from 20 countries participated in the event.

- Belarus (1)
- Bosnia and Herzegovina (1)
- Croatia (2)
- Czech Republic (1)
- Estonia (1)
- Finland (2)
- Germany (3)
- Greece (1)
- Hungary (1)
- Iceland (1)
- Italy (1)
- Lithuania (1)
- Luxembourg (1)
- Moldova (1)
- Montenegro (1)
- Netherlands (1)
- Poland (3)
- Slovenia (1)
- Spain (1)
- Turkey (2)
