= 2017 European Athletics Indoor Championships – Men's shot put =

The men's shot put event at the 2017 European Athletics Indoor Championships was held on 4 March 2015 at 11:00 (qualification) and at 19:20 (final) local time.

== Medalists ==
Gold	Silver	Bronze
Konrad Bukowiecki; Poland	Tomáš Staněk; Czech Republic	David Storl; Germany

== Records ==
Standing records prior to the 2013 European Athletics Indoor Championships
World record	Randy Barnes (USA)	22.66	Los Angeles, United States	20 January 1989
European record	Ulf Timmermann (GDR)	22.55	Senftenberg, East Germany	11 February 1989
Championship record	Ulf Timmermann (GDR)	22.19	Liévin, France	21 February 1987
World Leading	David Storl (GER)	21.37	Rochlitz, Germany	5 February 2017
European Leading	David Storl (GER)	21.37	Rochlitz, Germany	5 February 2017

== Results ==
=== Qualification ===
Qualification: Qualifying performance 20.50 (Q) or at least 8 best performers (q) advance to the Final.

Rank	Athlete	Nationality	#1	#2	#3	Result	Note
1	David Storl	Germany	21.16			21.16	Q
2	Konrad Bukowiecki	Poland	21.06			21.06	Q
3	Tomáš Staněk	Czech Republic	x	20.94		20.94	Q
4	Ladislav Prášil	Czech Republic	20.68			20.68	Q
5	Tsanko Arnaudov	Portugal	20.52			20.52	Q
5	Stipe Žunić	Croatia	20.52			20.52	Q
7	Mesud Pezer	Bosnia and Herzegovina	19.78	x	20.13	20.13	q
8	Mikhail Abramchuk	Belarus	19.82	19.61	19.99	19.99	q, SB
9	Borja Vivas	Spain	19.86	19.97	19.89	19.97	
10	Frédéric Dagée	France	19.97	x	x	19.97	
11	Asmir Kolašinac	Serbia	19.96	x	x	19.96	
12	Filip Mihaljević	Croatia	x	x	19.94	19.94	
13	Carlos Tobalina	Spain	19.64	19.22	19.83	19.83	
14	Andrei Gag	Romania	19.24	x	x	19.24	
15	Francisco Belo	Portugal	19.55	x	19.25	19.55	
16	Bob Bertemes	Luxembourg	19.47	x	19.42	19.47	
17	Arttu Kangas	Finland	18.86	19.42	x	19.42	
18	Rafał Kownatke	Poland	x	19.28	x	19.28	
19	Michał Haratyk	Poland	x	19.18	19.05	19.18	
20	Georgi Ivanov	Bulgaria	18.94	x	x	18.94	
21	Aliaksei Nichypar	Belarus	x	x	18.90	18.90	
22	Mihaíl Stamatóyiannis	Greece	x	18.83	x	18.83	
23	Matúš Olej	Slovakia	17.79	x	18.21	18.21	

=== Final ===
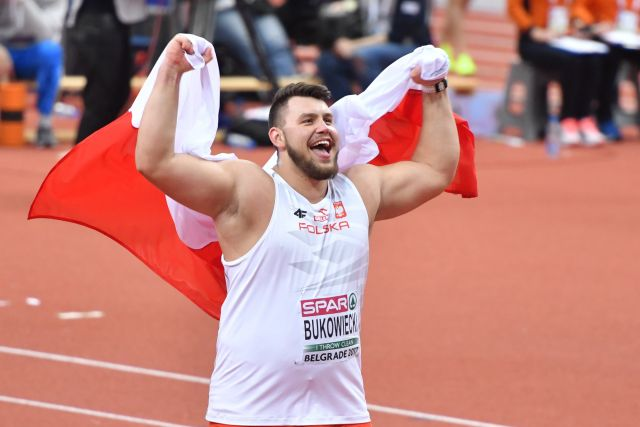
The winner Konrad Bukowiecki

Rank	Athlete	Nationality	#1	#2	#3	#4	#5	#6	Result	Note
1st place, gold medalist(s)	Konrad Bukowiecki	Poland	x	21.97	20.69	20.85	x	20.98	21.97	EU23R, WL, NR
2nd place, silver medalist(s)	Tomáš Staněk	Czech Republic	20.56	x	20.36	20.25	21.43	–	21.43	PB
3rd place, bronze medalist(s)	David Storl	Germany	21.15	x	20.88	21.19	21.30	21.15	21.30	
4	Tsanko Arnaudov	Portugal	20.49	20.16	x	19.81	19.50	21.08	21.08	NR
5	Stipe Žunić	Croatia	x	20.37	x	20.08	21.04	20.66	21.04	SB
6	Ladislav Prášil	Czech Republic	20.73	x	20.72	20.24	x	20.47	20.73	
7	Mesud Pezer	Bosnia and Herzegovina	20.37	20.26	20.16	20.30	x	x	20.37	
8	Mikhail Abramchuk	Belarus	x	x	19.38	x	x	x	19.38	
