= Athletics at the 2017 Summer Universiade – Men's shot put =

The men's shot put event at the 2017 Summer Universiade was held on 23 August at the Taipei Municipal Stadium.

== Medalists ==
Gold	Silver	Bronze
Francisco Belo; Portugal	Konrad Bukowiecki; Poland	Andrei Gag; Romania

== Results ==
=== Qualification ===
Qualification: 19.50 m (Q) or at least 12 best (q) qualified for the final.

Rank	Group	Athlete	Nationality	#1	#2	#3	Result	Notes
1	B	Andrei Gag	Romania	19.38	20.45		20.45	Q
2	A	Jakub Szyszkowski	Poland	19.34	19.98		19.98	Q
3	B	Konrad Bukowiecki	Poland	x	19.95		19.95	Q
4	A	Francisco Belo	Portugal	18.56	x	19.75	19.75	Q
5	A	Willian Dourado	Brazil	18.08	18.62	19.51	19.51	Q
6	A	Aliaksei Nichypar	Belarus	19.19	19.37	19.41	19.41	q
7	A	Tomaš Đurović	Montenegro	18.84	19.20	–	19.20	q
8	B	Šarūnas Banevičius	Lithuania	18.23	x	19.00	19.00	q
9	B	Jason van Rooyen	South Africa	18.90	18.30	x	18.90	q
10	A	Osman Can Özdeveci	Turkey	18.10	18.40	18.14	18.40	q
11	B	Coy Blair	United States	17.49	x	18.17	18.17	q
12	A	Cameron Cornelius	United States	16.81	17.67	15.02	17.67	q
13	B	Itamar Levi	Israel	17.34	x	17.36	17.36	
14	B	Ivan Ivanov	Kazakhstan	x	17.22	x	17.22	
15	A	Sullivan Parker	Canada	16.50	16.81	17.14	17.14	
16	A	Karl Koha	Estonia	16.83	x	x	16.83	
17	A	Remco Goetheer	Netherlands	x	x	16.71	16.71	
18	A	Matías Rodrigo López	Chile	x	16.64	x	16.64	
19	A	Ji Hyun-woo	South Korea	16.49	x	16.54	16.54	
20	B	Peter Millman	Canada	16.16	16.25	x	16.25	
21	B	Eduardo Espín	Ecuador	15.77	x	15.22	15.77	
22	B	Faridun Ashurov	Tajikistan	11.32	11.59	12.23	12.23	
	B	Lin You-ting	Chinese Taipei	x	x	x	NM	

=== Final ===
Rank	Name	Nationality	#1	#2	#3	#4	#5	#6	Result	Notes
1st place, gold medalist(s)	Francisco Belo	Portugal	19.24	x	20.86	x	20.64	x	20.86	PB
2nd place, silver medalist(s)	Konrad Bukowiecki	Poland	18.73	19.83	x	20.16	x	x	20.16	
3rd place, bronze medalist(s)	Andrei Gag	Romania	19.68	20.12	20.05	x	19.87	x	20.12	
4	Aliaksei Nichypar	Belarus	20.09	x	19.12	x	19.80	x	20.09	
5	Jakub Szyszkowski	Poland	18.96	19.87	x	x	19.25	x	19.87	
6	Šarūnas Banevičius	Lithuania	18.56	19.72	x	x	x	x	19.72	PB
7	Willian Dourado	Brazil	18.85	19.25	18.82	x	18.90	19.09	19.25	
8	Coy Blair	United States	18.00	18.48	18.98	18.27	x	18.48	18.98	
9	Osman Can Özdeveci	Turkey	17.89	18.08	18.52				18.52	
10	Tomaš Đurović	Montenegro	18.39	18.39	x				18.39	
11	Jason van Rooyen	South Africa	17.92	17.99	x				17.99	
12	Cameron Cornelius	United States	17.31	x	17.48				17.48	
