= Arttu Kangas =

Finnish shot putter (born 1993)

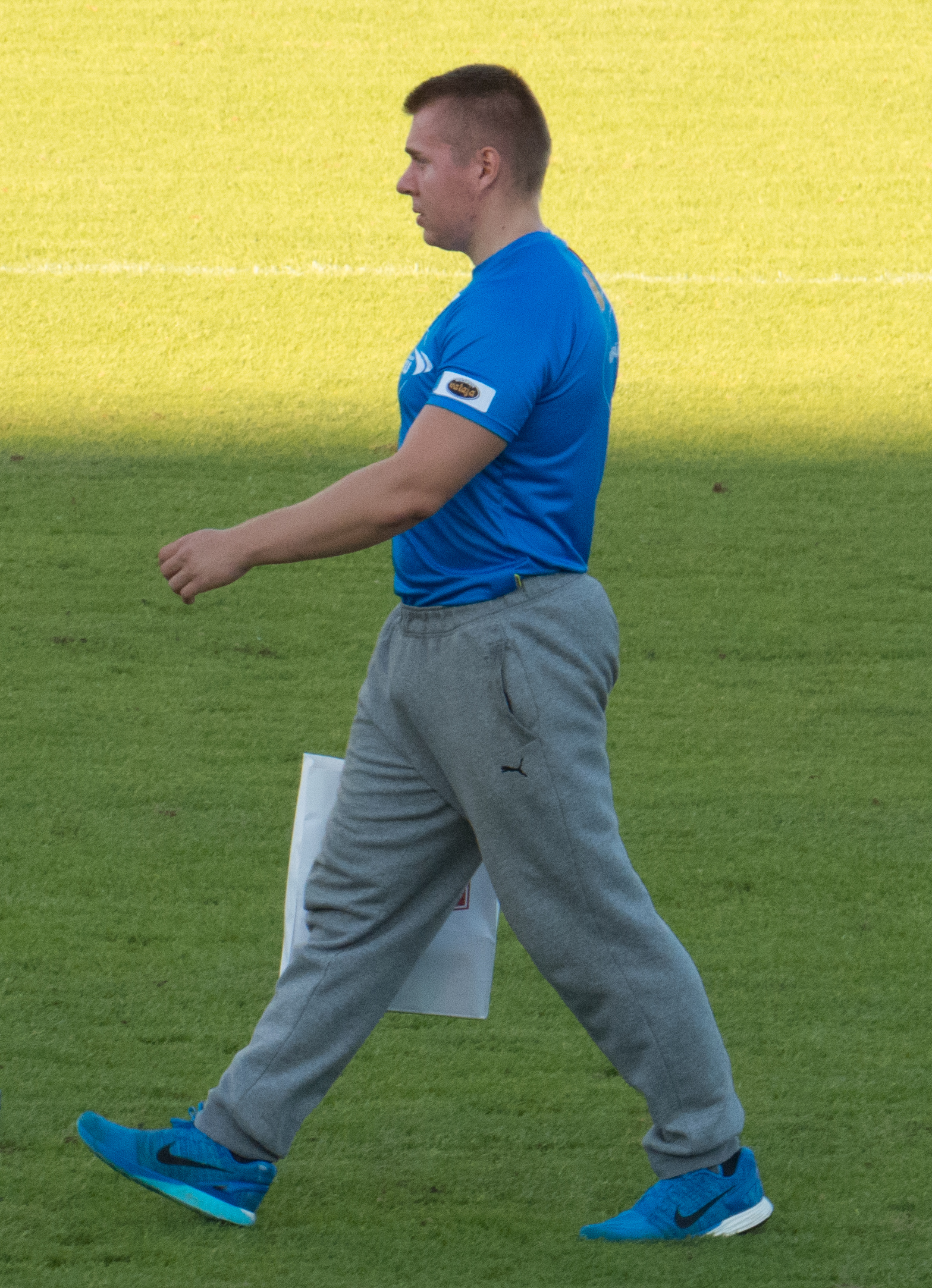
- Arttu Kangas in 2016

Personal information
- Born: 13 July 1993 (age 32)
- Height: 1.86 m (6 ft 1 in)
- Weight: 108 kg (238 lb)

Sport
- Sport: Athletics
- Event: Shot put
- Club: Kankaanpään seudun Leisku
- Coached by: Matti Yrjölä

Arttu Kangas (born 13 July 1993) is a Finnish athlete specialising in the shot put. He represented his country at three outdoor and two indoor European Championships without qualifying for the final.

His personal bests in the event are 20.30 metres outdoors (Raseborg 2016) and 20.18 metres indoors (Jyväskylä 2017).

== International competitions ==
Year	Competition	Venue	Position	Event	Notes
Representing Finland
2010	Youth Olympic Games	Singapore	5th	Shot put (5 kg)	20.45 m
2011	European Junior Championships	Tallinn, Estonia	30th (q)	Shot put (6 kg)	16.96 m
2012	World Junior Championships	Barcelona, Spain	4th	Shot put (6 kg)	19.85 m
2013	European U23 Championships	Tampere, Finland	7th	Shot put	18.94 m
2014	European Championships	Zürich, Switzerland	21st (q)	Shot put	19.07 m
2015	European Indoor Championships	Prague, Czech Republic	–	Shot put	NM
2015	European U23 Championships	Tallinn, Estonia	9th	Shot put	18.27 m
2015	Military World Games	Mungyeong, South Korea	9th	Shot put	17.78 m
2016	European Championships	Amsterdam, Netherlands	20th (q)	Shot put	18.91 m
2017	European Indoor Championships	Belgrade, Serbia	17th (q)	Shot put	19.42 m
2018	European Championships	Berlin, Germany	28th (q)	Shot put	18.17 m
