= Athletics at the 2010 Summer Youth Olympics – Boys' shot put =

Athletics – Boys' 100 metres at the I Summer Youth Olympic Games
- Venue: Bishan Stadium
- Date: August 18–22
- Competitors: 16 from 16 nations

Medalists
1st place, gold medalist(s)		Krzysztof Brzozowski	Poland
2nd place, silver medalist(s)		Jackson Gill	New Zealand
3rd place, bronze medalist(s)		Dennis Lewke	Germany

The boys' shot put competition at the 2010 Youth Olympic Games was held on 18–22 August 2010 in Bishan Stadium.

== Schedule ==
Date	Time	Round
18 August 2010	10:55	Qualification
22 August 2010	10:15	Final

== Results ==
=== Qualification ===
Rank	Athlete	1	2	3	4	Result	Notes	Q
1	Krzysztof Brzozowski (POL)	22.50	22.21	22.30	–	22.50	PB	FA
2	Jackson Gill (NZL)	20.78	21.73	x	–	21.73		FA
3	Damien Birkinhead (AUS)	x	20.89	x	–	20.89		FA
4	Frans Schutte (RSA)	x	20.24	x	x	20.24	PB	FA
5	Dennis Lewke (GER)	20.04	20.23	x	–	20.23		FA
6	Li Meng (CHN)	19.81	19.85	20.18	–	20.18		FA
7	Arttu Kangas (FIN)	19.93	x	19.89	–	19.93		FA
8	Joaquín Ballivián (CHI)	19.60	19.05	18.56	18.59	19.60	PB	FA
9	Mantas Jusis (LTU)	18.46	x	x	x	18.46		FB
10	Dimitrios Senikidis (GRE)	17.96	18.43	18.35	x	18.43		FB
11	Ashinia Miller (JAM)	x	18.30	x	x	18.30	PB	FB
12	Ifeanyi Augustine Nwoye (NGR)	16.84	17.80	18.02	17.76	18.02	PB	FB
13	Dmytro Ostrovskyy (UKR)	16.84	17.54	x	17.71	17.71		FB
14	Oscar Vestlund (SWE)	17.56	x	17.68	x	17.68		FB
15	Alejandro Noguera (ESP)	17.38	x	x	–	17.38		FB
16	Panyawut Bumroong (THA)	15.28	16.40	16.28	16.30	16.40		FB

=== Finals ===
==== Final B ====
Rank	Athlete	1	2	3	4	Result	Notes
1	Mantas Jusis (LTU)	18.61	x	18.96	18.89	18.96	
2	Oscar Vestlund (SWE)	17.30	18.93	x	17.81	18.93	PB
3	Dimitrios Senikidis (GRE)	18.18	18.47	17.97	18.50	18.50	
4	Alejandro Noguera (ESP)	17.89	x	18.40	x	18.40	
5	Ifeanyi Augustine Nwoye (NGR)	17.74	18.08	18.22	x	18.22	PB
6	Ashinia Miller (JAM)	17.15	17.63	17.76	x	17.76	
7	Dmytro Ostrovskyy (UKR)	17.31	17.47	x	x	17.47	
8	Panyawut Bumroong (THA)	16.03	16.04	x	x	16.04	

==== Final A ====
Rank	Athlete	1	2	3	4	Result	Notes
1st place, gold medalist(s)	Krzysztof Brzozowski (POL)	23.23	22.75	23.02	23.14	23.23	WYB
2nd place, silver medalist(s)	Jackson Gill (NZL)	21.50	22.60	x	22.56	22.60	PB
3rd place, bronze medalist(s)	Dennis Lewke (GER)	21.21	21.22	21.21	21.00	21.22	PB
4	Damien Birkinhead (AUS)	20.55	x	20.13	19.22	20.55	
5	Arttu Kangas (FIN)	19.67	19.83	20.45	x	20.45	
6	Joaquín Ballivián (CHI)	20.36	x	19.23	x	20.36	PB
7	Li Meng (CHN)	20.25	x	x	x	20.25	
	Frans Schutte (RSA)	x	x	x	x	NM	
