= Nicholas Scarvelis =

American-born Greek athlete (born 1993)

Personal information
- Nationality: Greek-American
- Born: February 2, 1993 (age 33) Santa Barbara, California, U.S.
- Height: 1.86 m (6 ft 1 in)

Sport
- Country: Greece
- Sport: Field
- Events: Shot put, Discus
- College team: UCLA Bruins
- Team: G.S. Trikala
- Turned pro: 2016
- Coached by: John Frazier

Achievements and titles
- Personal bests: 21.05 m NR; 20.38 m (i) NR

Nicholas Scarvelis (born February 2, 1993) is an American-born Greek former athlete. He represented Greece at the 2016 Olympics throwing the shot put. Previously he represented the United States at the 2012 World Junior Championships. His sister is Stamatia Scarvelis.

== Prep ==
Prior to his Olympic experience, he went to Dos Pueblos High School in Goleta, California. He was the 2011 CIF California State Meet Champion in the shot put throwing a school record 65 ft 4 in (19.91 m).

== NCAA ==
Next Nicholas Scarvelis threw for UCLA. He was the Pac-12 champion in the shot put three times and the discus once. He finished fourth at the 2016 NCAA Championships. He has the fourth-best shot put mark in UCLA history of 67 ft 7 1/2 in (20.61 m). Ahead of him on that list are John Godina, John Brenner and Dave Laut, all medalists at the Olympics or World Championships. His sister Stamatia is also a thrower for Tennessee Volunteers and previously competed for UCLA Bruins. His sister, Stamatia Scarvelis is the 2013 Pan American Junior Shot Put Champion, competing for USA. She has since also switched to compete for Greece.

Year	MPSF indoor	NCAA indoor	Pac-12 Outdoor	NCAA Outdoor
2015-16	Shot put 19.88 m (65 ft 2 1/2 in) 1st	Shot put 19.54 m (64 ft 1 1/4 in) 6th	Shot put 20.54 m (67 ft 4 1/2 in) 1st	Shot put 20.17 m (66 ft 2 in) 4th
2015-16			Discus 57.26 m (187 ft 10 1/4 in) 1st	Discus 54.50 m (178 ft 9 1/2 in) 18th
2014-15	Shot put 19.54 m (64 ft 1 1/4 in) 1st	Shot put 18.46 m (60 ft 6 3/4 in) 10th	Shot put 19.64 m (64 ft 5 in) 1st	Shot put 18.91 m (62 ft 1/4 in) 15th
2014-15			Discus 53.52 m (175 ft 7 in) 7th	
2013-14	Shot put 19.15 m (62 ft 9 3/4 in) 1st		Shot put 19.46 m (63 ft 10 in) 1st	Shot put 19.27 m (63 ft 2 1/2 in) 10th
2013-14			Discus 53.09 m (174 ft 2 in) 6th	
2012-13	Shot put 18.69 m (61 ft 3 3/4 in) 2nd		Shot put 17.88 m (58 ft 7 3/4 in) 2nd	Shot put 17.91 m (58 ft 9 in) 25th

== Professional ==
In early 2020, Scarvelis broke Michalis Stamatogiannis's previous Greek National Indoor Record of 20.36 Greek National Indoor Record, throwing 20.38m in a meet in Iowa City, Iowa.

Scarvelis placed second represented Greece at the 2017 national championship throwing the shot put 19.23 m (63 ft 1 in).

Scarvelis represented Greece at the 2016 Olympics throwing the shot put 19.37 m (63 ft 6 1/2 in) to place 27th.

Previously he represented the United States at the 2012 World Junior Championships. Nicholas threw 18.66 m (61 ft 2 1/2 in) at 2012 World Junior Championships in Athletics – Men's shot put to place 19th.

== International competitions ==
Year	Competition	Venue	Position	Notes
Representing Greece
2016	European Championships	Amsterdam, Netherlands	11th	19.55 m
2016	Olympic Games	Rio de Janeiro, Brazil	27th (q)	19.37 m
2018	European Championships	Berlin, Germany	11th	20.11 m
2019	European Indoor Championships	Glasgow, UK	8th	20.13 m
2022	World Championships	Eugene, United States	25th (q)	19.55 m
