= Mesud Pezer =

Bosnian shot putter

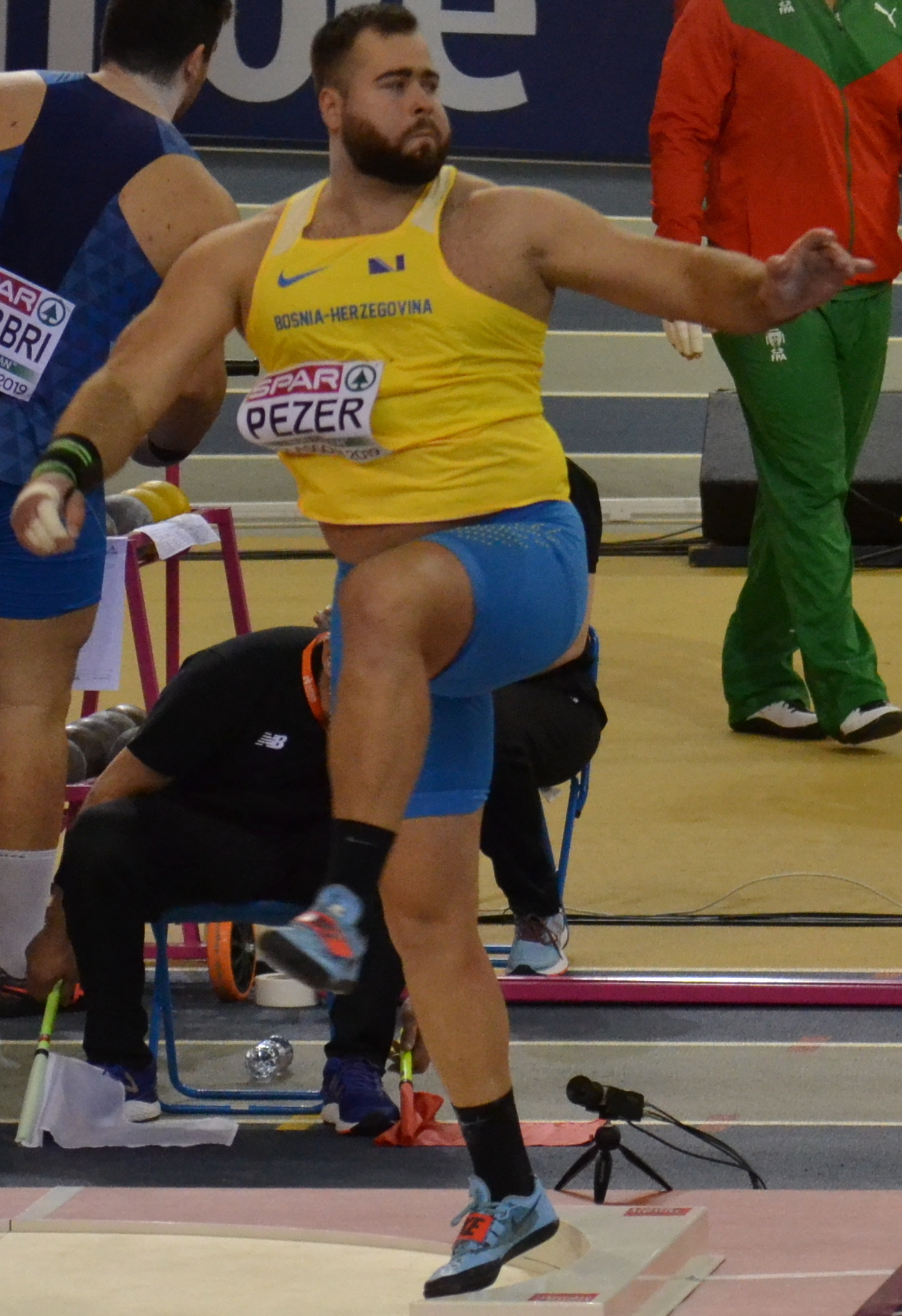
- Pezer in 2019

Personal information
- Born: 27 August 1994 (age 32) Zenica, Bosnia and Herzegovina
- Height: 1.97 m (6 ft 6 in)
- Weight: 120 kg (265 lb)

Sport
- Country: Bosnia and Herzegovina
- Sport: Track and field
- Event: Shot put
- Club: AK Zenica
- Coached by: Mehmed Skender

Achievements and titles
- Personal bests: Outdoor: 21.48 m NR (2019); Indoor: 21.15 m NR (2018)
Medal record
Representing Bosnia and Herzegovina
Mediterranean Games
| Bronze medal – third place | 2018 Tarragona | Shot Put |

Mesud Pezer (born 27 August 1994) is a Bosnian shot putter. He holds both national records in the shot put discipline. He competed at the 2016, 2020, and 2024 Summer Olympics and is the 2018 Mediterranean Games bronze medalist.

== Career ==
Pezer won a bronze medal in the 5 kg shot put at the 2011 European Youth Olympic Festival. He won a gold medal in the 6 kg shot put at the 2013 European Junior Championships.

Pezer threw for 20.58 metres at the 2016 Irvine Steve Scott Invitational and met the qualification standard for the 2016 Summer Olympics. There, he finished 24th in the qualifications and did not advance to the shot put final.

Pezer won the bronze medal at the 2018 Mediterranean Games behind fellow Bosnian Hamza Alić and Croatia's Stipe Žunić. He then finished 12th at the 2018 European Championships. He finished 20th in the qualifications of the 2019 World Championships.

Pezer competed at the 2020 Summer Olympics and qualified for the shot put final with a best throw of 21.33 metres. He went on to finish in 11th place. He finished eighth at the 2022 World Indoor Championships.

Pezer placed seventh in the shot put final at the 2023 European Indoor Championships. He then finished 22nd in the qualifications of the 2023 World Championships.

Pezer finished ninth at the 2024 World Indoor Championships. He then finished ninth at the 2024 European Championships. He then represented Bosnia and Herzegovina at the 2024 Summer Olympics but did not advance to the shot put final after finishing 26th in the qualifications.

== International competitions ==
| Year | Competition | Venue | Position | Event | Notes |
Representing Bosnia and Herzegovina
| 2011 | World Youth Championships | Lille, France | 6th | Shot put (5 kg) | 19.79 m |
| 2011 | European Youth Olympic Festival | Trabzon, Turkey | 3rd | Shot put (5 kg) | 19.13 m |
| 2012 | World Junior Championships | Tallinn, Estonia | 5th | Shot put (6 kg) | 19.83 m |
| 2013 | European Junior Championships | Rieti, Italy | 1st | Shot put (6 kg) | 20.44 m |
| 2015 | European U23 Championships | Tallinn, Estonia | 4th | Shot put | 18.98 m |
| 2016 | European Championships | Amsterdam, Netherlands | 12th | Shot put | 19.49 m |
| 2016 | Olympic Games | Rio de Janeiro, Brazil | 24th (q) | Shot put | 19.55 m |
| 2017 | European Indoor Championships | Belgrade, Serbia | 7th | Shot put | 20.37 m |
| 2017 | World Championships | London, United Kingdom | 21st (q) | Shot put | 19.88 m |
| 2017 | DécaNation | Angers, France | 3rd | Shot put | 20.18 m |
| 2018 | World Indoor Championships | Birmingham, United Kingdom | 5th | Shot put | 21.15 m |
| 2018 | Mediterranean Games | Tarragona, Spain | 3rd | Shot put | 19.82 m |
| 2018 | European Championships | Berlin, Germany | 12th | Shot put | 19.91 m |
| 2019 | European Indoor Championships | Glasgow, United Kingdom | 6th | Shot put | 20.69 m |
| 2019 | World Championships | Doha, Qatar | 20th (q) | Shot put | 20.17 m |
| 2021 | European Indoor Championships | Toruń, Poland | 8th | Shot put | 19.77 m |
| 2021 | Olympic Games | Tokyo, Japan | 11th | Shot put | 20.08 m |
| 2022 | World Indoor Championships | Belgrade, Serbia | 8th | Shot put | 20.94 m |
| 2023 | European Indoor Championships | Istanbul, Turkey | 7th | Shot put | 19.94 m |
| 2023 | World Championships | Budapest, Hungary | 22nd (q) | Shot put | 19.86 m |
| 2024 | World Indoor Championships | Glasgow, United Kingdom | 9th | Shot put | 20.41 m |
| 2024 | European Championships | Rome, Italy | 9th | Shot put | 19.92 m |
| 2024 | Olympic Games | Paris, France | 26th (q) | Shot put | 19.03 m |
| 2025 | World Championships | Tokyo, Japan | – | Shot put | NM |
| 2026 | European Championships | Birmingham, United Kingdom | 19th (q) | Shot put | 18.89 m |
| 2026 | Mediterranean Games | Taranto, Italy | 9th | Shot put | 18.78 m |

^{Note: This table only includes major athletics championships and does not include Diamond League or World Athletics Continental Tour/IAAF World Challenge meets.}
