= 2019 World Athletics Championships – Men's shot put =

Men's shot put at the 2019 World Championships
- Venue: Khalifa International Stadium
- Dates: 3 October (qualification); 5 October (final)
- Competitors: 34 from 25 nations
- Winning distance: 22.91 CR

Medalists
gold medal	Joe Kovacs	United States
silver medal	Ryan Crouser	United States
bronze medal	Tomas Walsh	New Zealand

Video on YouTube Official Video

The men's shot put at the 2019 World Athletics Championships was held at the Khalifa International Stadium in Doha from 3 to 5 October 2019. The winning margin was 1 cm which as of 2024 is the only time the men's shot put has been won by under 5 cm at these championships.

== Summary ==
It took 20.90 to automatically qualify. Exactly 12 men made that distance, eight of them on their first attempt. There were no further place qualifiers to the final.

This capped a buildup of several outstanding athletes. Four members of the 74-foot club competed, with Darlan Romani joining in 2019 and Ryan Crouser improving his personal best to sixth all time. Four more athletes had surpassed 22 metres in the previous two seasons.

With 22 metres the standard, the first throw of the competition was 22.36m by Crouser. Three throws later, Romani moved into second with a 21.61m. As the last thrower throughout the competition, Tomas Walsh launched a new Oceana continental record 22.90 m (75 ft 1 1/2 in). It was the longest throw in 29 years, making him the #4 thrower in history. On his second throw, Romani threw 22.53m, just short of 74 feet, which put him into second place. Crouser duplicated his first throw in the third. It took 21.18m just to get three more throws.

In the fourth round, Joe Kovacs threw 21.95m to move into fourth, then Crouser threw 22.71m to move into second place. In the fifth round, Walsh landed his second best throw, 22.56m.

In the final round, Kovacs stepped into the ring and tossed it 22.91 m (75 ft 1 3/4 in), equalling Alessandro Andrei for the #3 thrower in history. More importantly, he took the lead. A couple of throws later, Crouser stepped in to throw his best 22.90 m (75 ft 1 1/2 in) to tie Walsh. Walsh fouled again. With his 22.71m second best throw, compared to 22.56m for Walsh, Crouser took second. In the space of 5 minutes, Walsh went from the #4 thrower in history, to third place in the competition. Romani's best throw of 22.53m would have been good enough to win the gold medal in every World and Olympic shot put competition prior to this championship, however it was not enough to secure even the bronze here as he finished in 4th place.

This has been called the greatest shot put competition in history.

== Records ==
Before the competition records were as follows:

World record	Randy Barnes (USA)	23.12 m	Westwood, United States	20 May 1990
Championship record	Werner Günthör (SUI)	22.23 m	Rome, Italy	29 August 1987
World Leading	Ryan Crouser (USA)	22.74 m	Long Beach, United States	20 April 2019
African Record	Janus Robberts (RSA)	21.97 m	Eugene, United States	2 June 2001
Asian Record	Sultan Al-Hebshi (KSA)	21.13 m	Doha, Qatar	8 May 2009
North, Central American and Caribbean record	Randy Barnes (USA)	23.12 m	Westwood, United States	20 May 1990
South American Record	Darlan Romani (BRA)	22.61 m	Palo Alto, United States	30 June 2019
European Record	Ulf Timmermann (GDR)	23.06 m	Chania, Greece	22 May 1988
Oceanian record	Tomas Walsh (NZL)	22.67 m	Auckland, New Zealand	25 March 2018

The following records were established during the competition:

Date	Event	Name	Nationality	Time	Record
5 October	Final	Joe Kovacs	USA	22.91	CR
5 October	Final	Tom Walsh	NZL	22.90	AR

== Qualification standard ==
The standard to qualify automatically for entry was 20.70 m.

== Schedule ==
The event schedule, in local time (UTC+3), was as follows:

Date	Time	Round
3 October	19:20	Qualification
5 October	20:05	Final

== Results ==
=== Qualification ===
Qualification: Qualifying Performance 20.90 (Q) or at least 12 best performers (q) advanced to the final.

Rank	Group	Name	Nationality	Round			Mark	Notes
Rank	Group	Name	Nationality	1	2	3	Mark	Notes
1	A	Tomas Walsh	New Zealand	21.92			21.92	Q
2	A	Darlan Romani	Brazil	21.69			21.69	Q
3	B	Ryan Crouser	United States	21.67			21.67	Q
4	A	Armin Sinančević	Serbia	20.48	21.51		21.51	Q, PB
5	A	Darrell Hill	United States	21.25			21.25	Q
6	A	Konrad Bukowiecki	Poland	21.16			21.16	Q
7	B	Jacko Gill	New Zealand	21.12			21.12	Q
8	A	Tomáš Staněk	Czech Republic	20.43	20.73	21.02	21.02	Q
9	B	Filip Mihaljević	Croatia	21.00			21.00	Q
10	A	Tim Nedow	Canada	20.51	20.53	20.94	20.94	Q
11	A	Chukwuebuka Enekwechi	Nigeria	20.12	20.94		20.94	Q
12	B	Joe Kovacs	United States	20.92			20.92	Q
13	A	Leonardo Fabbri	Italy	x	20.75	x	20.75	
14	B	Mostafa Amr Hassan	Egypt	20.23	20.55	x	20.55	
15	A	Jakub Szyszkowski	Poland	20.55	x	19.85	20.55	
16	B	Michał Haratyk	Poland	20.44	20.52	20.11	20.52	
17	B	Andrei Gag	Romania	20.50	18.91	x	20.50	
18	B	Tejinder Pal Singh Toor	India	20.43	x	19.55	20.43	SB
19	B	Wictor Petersson	Sweden	20.31	x	x	20.31	
20	B	Mesud Pezer	Bosnia and Herzegovina	20.17	x	19.55	20.17	
21	A	Eldred Henry	British Virgin Islands	19.31	x	20.13	20.13	
22	A	O'Dayne Richards	Jamaica	19.75	19.02	20.07	20.07	
23	B	Denzel Comenentia	Netherlands	x	20.03	19.64	20.03	
24	B	Orazio Cremona	South Africa	x	x	19.98	19.98	
25	A	Mohamed Magdi Hamza	Egypt	x	19.91	x	19.91	
26	B	Bob Bertemes	Luxembourg	x	19.40	19.89	19.89	
27	B	Asmir Kolašinac	Serbia	19.78	x	19.86	19.86	
28	A	Maksim Afonin	Authorised Neutral Athletes	19.76	19.55	19.82	19.82	
29	B	Franck Elemba	Congo	19.43	19.76	19.59	19.76	SB
30	A	Ivan Ivanov	Kazakhstan	19.57	19.73	x	19.73	
31	B	Aleksandr Lesnoy	Authorised Neutral Athletes	19.43	19.62	x	19.62	
32	B	Francisco Belo	Portugal	18.99	x	19.52	19.52	
33	A	Kemal Mešić	Bosnia and Herzegovina	19.49	19.19	19.44	19.49	
34	B	Uziel Muñoz	Mexico	x	x	19.06	19.06	
	A	Kristo Galeta	Estonia				DNS	

=== Final ===
The final was started on 5 October at 20:05.

Rank	Name	Nationality	Round						Mark	Notes
Rank	Name	Nationality	1	2	3	4	5	6	Mark	Notes
1st place, gold medalist(s)	Joe Kovacs	United States	20.90	21.63	21.24	21.95	21.94	22.91	22.91	CR
2nd place, silver medalist(s)	Ryan Crouser	United States	22.36	x	22.36	22.71	x	22.90	22.90	PB
3rd place, bronze medalist(s)	Tomas Walsh	New Zealand	22.90	x	x	x	22.56	x	22.90	AR
4	Darlan Romani	Brazil	21.61	22.53	22.03	22.13	x	x	22.53	
5	Darrell Hill	United States	20.58	21.38	21.65	x	21.23	x	21.65	
6	Konrad Bukowiecki	Poland	20.73	21.46	x	20.36	x	x	21.46	
7	Jacko Gill	New Zealand	21.41	21.27	20.74	x	21.01	21.45	21.45	
8	Chukwuebuka Enekwechi	Nigeria	21.18	x	20.90	20.98	20.59	21.01	21.18	
9	Tim Nedow	Canada	x	20.50	20.85				20.85	
10	Tomáš Staněk	Czech Republic	20.61	20.79	20.46				20.79	
11	Filip Mihaljević	Croatia	20.33	20.38	20.48				20.48	
	Armin Sinančević	Serbia	x	x	x				NM	
