= Michał Haratyk =

Polish shot putter (born 1992)

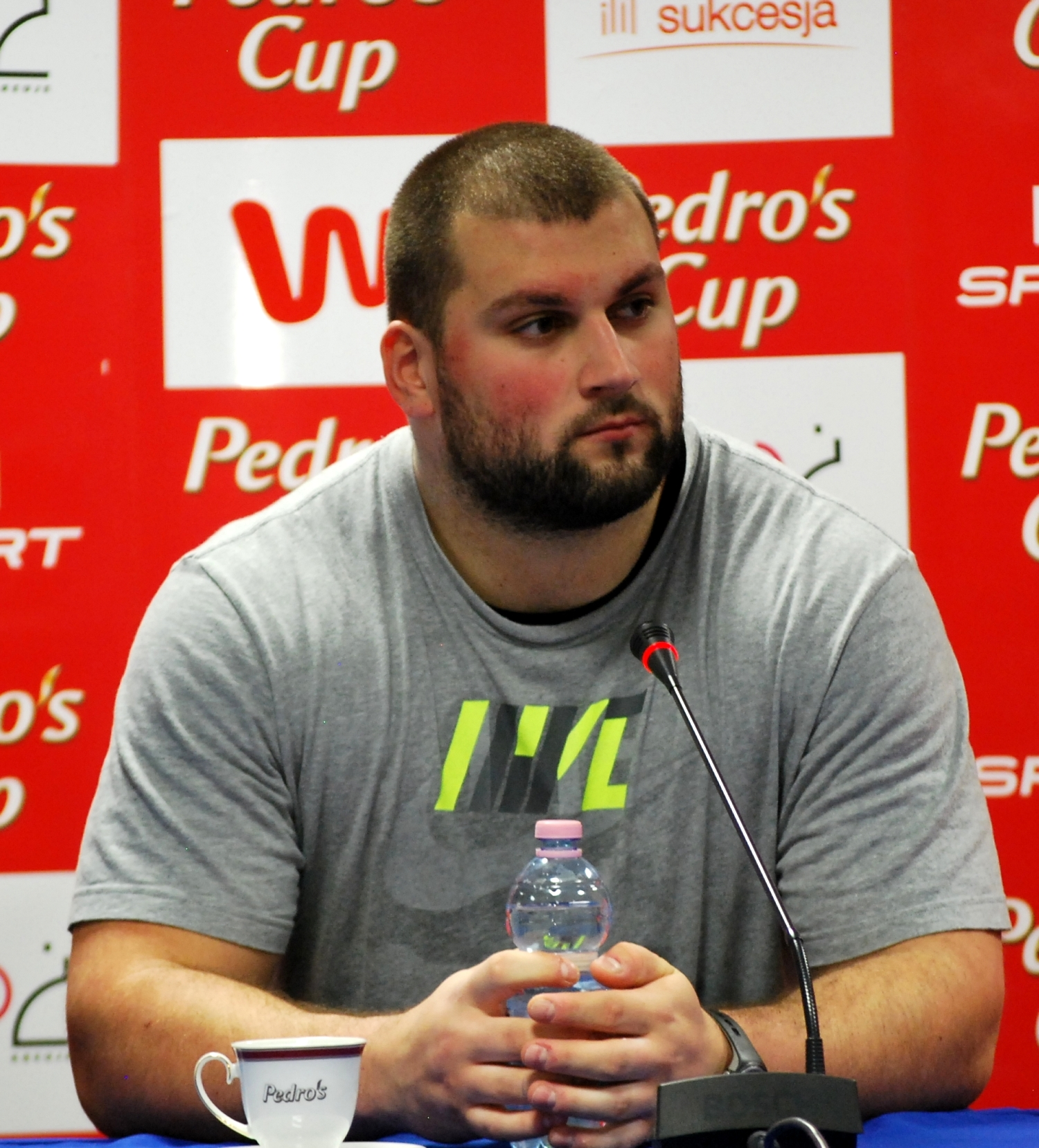
- Haratyk in 2016

Personal information
- Born: 10 April 1992 (age 34) Cieszyn, Poland
- Height: 1.94 m (6 ft 4 in)
- Weight: 136 kg (300 lb)

Sport
- Sport: Athletics
- Event: Shot put
- Club: KS AZS AWF Kraków; KS Sprinter Bielsko-Biała
- Coached by: Piotr Galon
Medal record
Men's athletics
Representing Poland
European Championships
Gold medal – first place	2018 Berlin	Shot put
Silver medal – second place	2016 Amsterdam	Shot put
Bronze medal – third place	2024 Rome	Shot put
European Indoor Championships
Gold medal – first place	2019 Glasgow	Shot put
Silver medal – second place	2021 Toruń	Shot put
European Team Championships
Gold medal – first place	2019 Bydgoszcz	Shot put
Gold medal – first place	2021 Chorzów	Shot put
Representing Europe
Continental Cup
Bronze medal – third place	2018 Ostrava	Shot put

Michał Haratyk (born 10 April 1992 in Cieszyn) is a Polish athlete specialising in the shot put.

== Career ==
He made his international debut at the 2016 World Indoor Championships where he finished distant fourteenth despite having the third-farthest throw that indoor season. Later that year he achieved his biggest success to date by winning the silver medal in Amsterdam at the 2016 European Championships. His Olympic debut, however, was not as successful as he failed to qualify for the final at the Rio Games a month later.

He achieved 21.97 metres outdoors at the 2018 IAAF Diamond League meeting in Eugene. His personal best indoors is 21.47 metres (Toruń, 2018). In 2018, he set the new Polish record in shot put by achieving 22.08 metres at the Golden Spike Ostrava meeting. In 2019, he beat his previous record by achieving 22.32 metres at a sports meeting in Warsaw, which makes it the best result by a European shot putter in 21st century and moves him to fifth on the European outdoor all-time list.

Haratyk's older brother, Łukasz, was also a shot putter.

== Competition record ==
Year	Competition	Venue	Position	Notes
Representing Poland
2016	World Indoor Championships	Portland, United States	14th	19.48 m
2016	European Championships	Amsterdam, Netherlands	2nd	21.19 m
2016	Olympic Games	Rio de Janeiro, Brazil	18th (q)	19.97 m
2017	European Indoor Championships	Belgrade, Serbia	19th (q)	19.18 m
2017	World Championships	London, United Kingdom	5th	21.41 m
2017	DécaNation	Angers, France	2nd	21.38 m
2018	World Indoor Championships	Birmingham, United Kingdom	10th	20.69 m
2018	IAAF Diamond League	Eugene, United States	2nd	21.97 m
2018	Golden Spike Ostrava	Ostrava, Czech Republic	2nd	22.08 m
2018	Athletics World Cup	London, United Kingdom	1st	21.95 m
2018	European Championships	Berlin, Germany	1st	21.72 m
2019	European Indoor Championships	Glasgow, Scotland	1st	21.65 m
2019	World Championships	Doha, Qatar	16th (q)	20.52 m
2021	European Indoor Championships	Toruń, Poland	2nd	21.47 m
2021	European Team Championships	Chorzów, Poland	1st	21.34 m
2021	Olympic Games	Tokyo, Japan	13th (q)	20.86 m
2022	World Indoor Championships	Belgrade, Serbia	9th	20.88 m
2022	World Championships	Eugene, United States	14th (q)	20.13 m
2022	European Championships	Munich, Germany	5th	20.90 m
2023	European Indoor Championships	Istanbul, Turkey	–	NM
2023	World Championships	Budapest, Hungary	25th (q)	19.51 m
2024	European Championships	Rome, Italy	3rd	20.94 m
2024	Olympic Games	Paris, France	19th (q)	19.94 m
