= 2012 World Junior Championships in Athletics – Men's shot put =

The men's shot put at the 2012 World Junior Championships in Athletics was held at the Estadi Olímpic Lluís Companys on 11 July.

== Medalists ==
Gold	Jacko Gill; New Zealand
Silver	Krzysztof Brzozowski; Poland
Bronze	Damien Birkinhead; Australia

== Records ==
Prior to the competition, the existing world junior and championship records were as follows.

World Junior Record	David Storl (GER)	22.73	Osterode, Germany	14 July 2009
Championship Record	Edis Elkasević (CRO)	21.47	Kingston, Jamaica	16 July 2002
World Junior Leading	Jacko Gill (NZL)	22.30	Waitakere, New Zealand	24 March 2012

== Results ==
=== Qualification ===
Qualification: Standard 19.30 m (Q) or at least best 12 qualified (q)

Rank	Group	Name	Nationality	#1	#2	#3	Result	Note
1	B	Jacko Gill	New Zealand	21.50			21.50	Q, CR
2	A	Damien Birkinhead	Australia	20.01			20.01	Q
3	A	Mesud Pezer	Bosnia and Herzegovina	18.92	19.17	19.96	19.96	Q, NJ
4	B	Stephen Mozia	United States	19.14	19.81		19.81	Q
5	A	Krzysztof Brzozowski	Poland	X	19.77		19.77	Q
6	A	Ashinia Miller	Jamaica	18.56	18.58	19.71	19.71	Q
7	B	Arttu Kangas	Finland	19.27	19.26	19.61	19.61	Q
8	B	Bob Bertemes	Luxembourg	19.33			19.33	Q
9	A	Alejandro Noguera	Spain	19.28	X	–	19.28	q, NJ
10	B	Li Jun	China	19.19	X	18.79	19.19	q
11	A	Joaquín Ballivián	Chile	18.15	X	19.18	19.18	q
12	B	Bodo Göder	Germany	19.03	19.14	19.15	19.15	q
13	B	Ahmed Ahmed Hassan	Egypt	X	18.40	19.05	19.05	PB
14	A	Li Meng	China	18.66	18.87	18.57	18.87	
15	A	Matti Sivonen	Finland	18.73	18.55	X	18.73	PB
16	B	Vladyslav Chernikov	Ukraine	17.38	18.15	18.72	18.72	
17	B	Boris Vain	France	17.73	X	18.72	18.72	
18	A	Jaromír Mazgal	Czech Republic	18.69	18.23	X	18.69	SB
19	A	Nicholas Scarvelis	United States	18.43	18.47	18.66	18.66	
20	A	Jan Josef Jeuschede	Germany	18.52	18.26	X	18.52	
21	B	Aliaksei Nichypar	Belarus	X	X	18.39	18.39	
22	B	Murat Gündüz	Turkey	17.77	17.78	18.35	18.35	
23	A	Dimítrios Senikídis	Greece	18.21	X	17.96	18.21	PB
24	B	Alex Sales	Brazil	17.79	18.19	X	18.19	
25	A	Nelson Fernandes	Brazil	18.08	X	X	18.08	
26	B	Mantas Jusis	Lithuania	X	17.75	17.90	17.90	
27	A	Mykola Bagach	Ukraine	16.93	16.90	17.90	17.90	
28	B	Andrzej Regin	Poland	17.43	17.49	17.83	17.83	
29	A	Tibor Rakovszky	Hungary	17.79	X	X	17.79	
30	A	Jordan Young	Canada	17.28	17.61	X	17.61	
31	A	Hezekiel Romeo	Trinidad and Tobago	17.15	X	17.50	17.50	
32	A	Viktor Gardenkrans	Sweden	17.37	X	X	17.37	
33	A	Tomaš Durovic	Montenegro	17.27	16.72	15.99	17.27	PB
34	B	Mohamed Omar Moussa Abdulqadri	Saudi Arabia	17.16	16.38	X	17.16	
35	B	Sindri Lárusson	Iceland	16.82	16.39	16.77	16.82	
36	B	David Daniš	Slovakia	16.59	X	16.59	16.59	
37	B	Sullivan Parker	Canada	15.73	X	15.56	15.73	PB
–	B	Emmanuel Onyia	Jamaica	X	X	X	NM	
–	A	Praduman Singh	India	X	X	X	NM	
–	B	Ifeanyi Augustine Nwoye	Nigeria	–	–	–	–	DNS

=== Final ===
Rank	Name	Nationality	#1	#2	#3	#4	#5	#6	Result	Note
1st place, gold medalist(s)	Jacko Gill	New Zealand	21.74	22.19	22.15	21.84	22.20	22.02	22.20	CR
2nd place, silver medalist(s)	Krzysztof Brzozowski	Poland	21.78	X	X	20.88	21.37	X	21.78	NJ
3rd place, bronze medalist(s)	Damien Birkinhead	Australia	20.44	20.60	21.03	20.83	21.14	20.40	21.14	NJ
4	Arttu Kangas	Finland	19.52	19.69	X	X	19.73	19.85	19.85	
5	Mesud Pezer	Bosnia and Herzegovina	X	18.80	19.83	X	18.81	X	19.83	
6	Li Jun	China	18.35	19.00	19.72	X	19.38	19.46	19.72	
7	Bodo Göder	Germany	19.27	18.96	19.70	19.52	X	X	19.70	
8	Alejandro Noguera	Spain	19.08	19.55	X	X	X	19.42	19.55	
9	Joaquín Ballivián	Chile	18.78	19.47	18.70				19.47	
10	Stephen Mozia	United States	19.45	X	19.22				19.45	
11	Ashinia Miller	Jamaica	17.57	18.70	16.86				18.70	
12	Bob Bertemes	Luxembourg	X	X	X				NM	

== Participation ==
According to an unofficial count, 39 athletes from 30 countries participated in the event.

- Australia (1)
- Belarus (1)
- Bosnia and Herzegovina (1)
- Brazil (2)
- Canada (2)
- Chile (1)
- China (2)
- Czech Republic (1)
- Egypt (1)
- Finland (2)
- France (1)
- Germany (2)
- Greece (1)
- Hungary (1)
- Iceland (1)
- India (1)
- Jamaica (2)
- Lithuania (1)
- Luxembourg (1)
- Montenegro (1)
- New Zealand (1)
- Poland (2)
- Saudi Arabia (1)
- Slovakia (1)
- Spain (1)
- Sweden (1)
- Trinidad and Tobago (1)
- Turkey (1)
- Ukraine (2)
- United States (2)
