= Aleksandr Lesnoy =

Russian shot putter (born 1988)

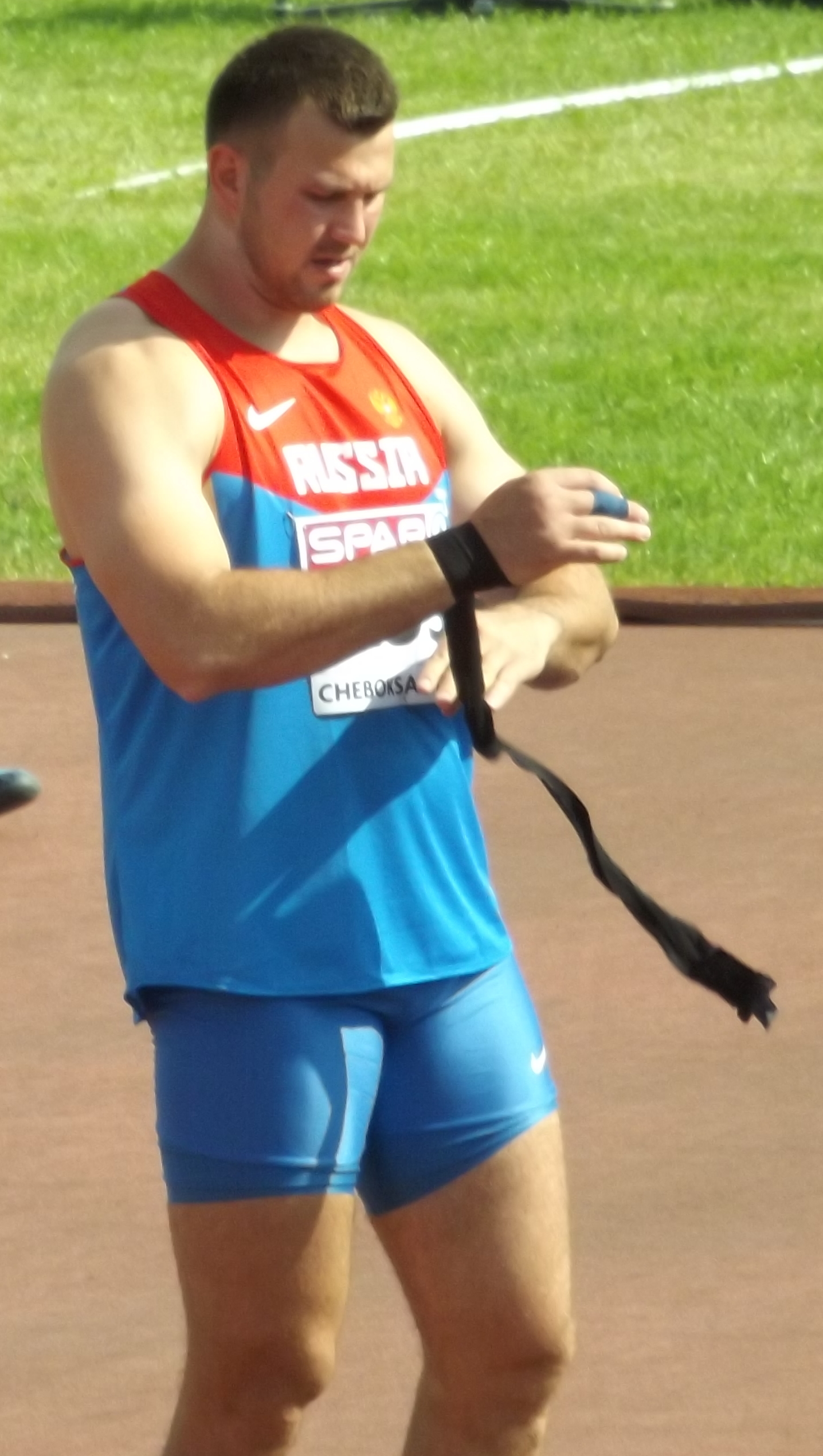
- Lesnoy at the 2015 European Team Championships.

Personal information
- Full name: Aleksandr Mikhailovich Lesnoy
- Nationality: (Russia) Russian
- Born: 29 July 1988 (age 37) Moscow, Russian SFSR, Soviet Union

Sport
- Country: Russia
- Sport: shot put

Aleksandr Mikhailovich Lesnoy (Russian: Александр Михайлович Лесной; born 28 July 1988) is a Russian athlete specialising in the shot put. He won the gold medal at the 2013 Summer Universiade.

His personal bests in the event are 21.40 metres outdoors (Sochi 2014) and 20.51 metres indoors (Moscow 2014).

== International competitions ==
Year	Competition	Venue	Position	Event	Notes
Representing Russia
2013	Universiade	Kazan, Russia	1st	Shot put	20.30 m
2013	World Championships	Moscow, Russia	21st (q)	Shot put	19.01 m
2014	World Indoor Championships	Sopot, Poland	8th	Shot put	20.16 m
2014	European Championships	Zürich, Switzerland	10th	Shot put	19.83 m
2015	European Indoor Championships	Prague, Czech Republic	10th (q)	Shot put	19.91 m
2015	World Championships	Beijing, China	16th (q)	Shot put	19.78 m
Competing as neutral
2017	World Championships	London, Great Britain	26th (q)	Shot put	19.67 m
2018	European Championships	Berlin, Germany	5th	Shot put	21.04 m
2019	World Championships	Doha, Qatar	31st (q)	Shot put	19.62 m
