= 2014 European Athletics Championships – Men's shot put =

Men's shot put at the European Athletics Championships

The men's shot put at the 2014 European Athletics Championships took place at the Letzigrund on 12 August.

== Medalists ==
Gold	David Storl; Germany
Silver	Borja Vivas; Spain
Bronze	Tomasz Majewski; Poland

== Records ==
Standing records prior to the 2014 European Athletics Championships
World record	Randy Barnes (USA)	23.12 m	Westwood, United States	20 May 1990
European record	Ulf Timmermann (GDR)	23.06 m	Chania, Greece	22 May 1988
Championship record	Werner Günthör (SUI)	22.22 m	Stuttgart, West Germany	28 August 1986
World Leading	Joe Kovacs (USA)	22.03 m	Sacramento, United States	25 June 2014
European Leading	David Storl (GER)	21.97 m	London, Great Britain	20 July 2014

== Schedule ==
Date	Time	Round
12 August 2014	10:04	Qualification
12 August 2014	19:34	Final

All times are local times (UTC+2)+

== Results ==
=== Qualification ===
20.10 m (Q) or at least 12 best performers (q) advanced to the Final.

Rank	Group	Name	Nationality	#1	#2	#3	Mark	Note
1	B	David Storl	Germany	20.76			20.76	Q
2	A	Borja Vivas	Spain	20.53			20.53	Q
3	B	Tomasz Majewski	Poland	20.50			20.50	Q
4	B	Gaëtan Bucki	France	20.05	20.21		20.21	Q, PB
5	B	Georgi Ivanov	Bulgaria	20.18			20.18	Q
6	A	Asmir Kolašinac	Serbia	19.82	20.15		20.15	Q
7	B	Valeriy Kokoyev	Russia	19.78	x	20.09	20.09	q
8	A	Jan Marcell	Czech Republic	19.23	20.09	19.60	20.09	q
9	B	Carlos Tobalina	Spain	18.04	20.06	20.04	20.06	q
10	B	Marco Fortes	Portugal	19.19	18.86	20.03	20.03	q
11	A	Stipe Žunić	Croatia	19.67	19.94	19.80	19.94	q
12	A	Aleksandr Lesnoy	Russia	19.27	19.52	19.88	19.88	q
13	B	Ladislav Prášil	Czech Republic	19.83	x	x	19.83	
14	A	Tomáš Stanek	Czech Republic	x	18.39	19.61	19.61	
15	A	Yioser Toledo	Spain	18.85	19.59	x	19.59	
16	B	Marin Premeru	Croatia	x	18.95	19.55	19.55	
17	B	Leif Arrhenius	Sweden	19.11	19.30	19.54	19.54	
18	A	Jakub Szyszkowski	Poland	19.15	x	19.46	19.46	
19	B	Hamza Alić	Bosnia and Herzegovina	x	19.10	19.36	19.36	
20	A	Andrei Gag	Romania	19.18	19.08	18.88	19.18	
21	A	Arttu Kangas	Finland	18.17	18.62	19.07	19.07	
22	A	Kemal Mešić	Bosnia and Herzegovina	x	18.81	x	18.81	
23	A	Māris Urtāns	Latvia	18.35	x	x	18.35	

=== Final ===
Rank	Athlete	Nationality	#1	#2	#3	#4	#5	#6	Result	Notes
1st place, gold medalist(s)	David Storl	Germany	21.41	x	x	20.75	x	20.98	21.41	
2nd place, silver medalist(s)	Borja Vivas	Spain	20.07	20.86	20.59	20.69	x	20.38	20.86	
3rd place, bronze medalist(s)	Tomasz Majewski	Poland	20.56	20.83	20.65	20.76	20.57	20.50	20.83	
4	Stipe Žunić	Croatia	20.02	20.68	x	x	19.73	19.86	20.68	PB
5	Asmir Kolašinac	Serbia	x	20.11	20.36	x	x	20.55	20.55	
6	Jan Marcell	Czech Republic	19.31	20.48	20.17	19.77	x	x	20.48	
7	Marco Fortes	Portugal	19.65	20.32	20.35	x	20.21	19.66	20.35	
8	Valeriy Kokoyev	Russia	18.93	19.59	20.23	x	x	x	20.23	SB
9	Carlos Tobalina	Spain	19.80	20.04	x				20.04	
10	Aleksandr Lesnoy	Russia	19.52	19.49	19.83				19.83	
11	Gaëtan Bucki	France	19.75	19.55	19.50				19.75	
12	Georgi Ivanov	Bulgaria	x	x	x				NM	
