= Daniele Secci =

Italian shot putter

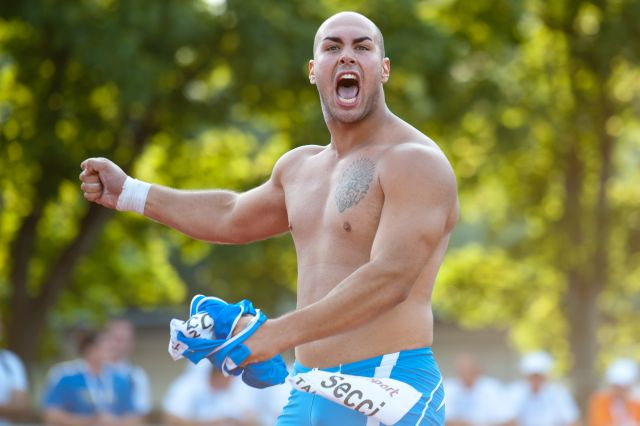
- Secci at the 2011 European Junior Championships

Personal information
- Born: 9 March 1992 (age 34) Rome, Italy
- Height: 1.93 m (6 ft 4 in)
- Weight: 110 kg (240 lb)

Sport
- Country: Italy
- Sport: Athletics
- Event: Shot put
- Club: G.S. Fiamme Gialle

Achievements and titles
- Personal bests: Shot put: 19.03 m (2014); Shot put (i): 19.25 m (2014)
Medal record
European Junior Championships
Silver medal – second place	2011 Tallinn	Shot put

Daniele Secci (born 9 March 1992) is an Italian shot putter.

== Biography ==
He won a silver medal at the 2011 European Athletics Junior Championships, behind Youth Olympic champion Krzysztof Brzozowski.

== National titles ==
Daniele Secci has won 2 time the individual national championship.

- 1 win in the shot put outdoor (2014)
- 1 win in the shot put indoor (2014)
