= Tomáš Staněk =

Czech shot putter (born 1991)

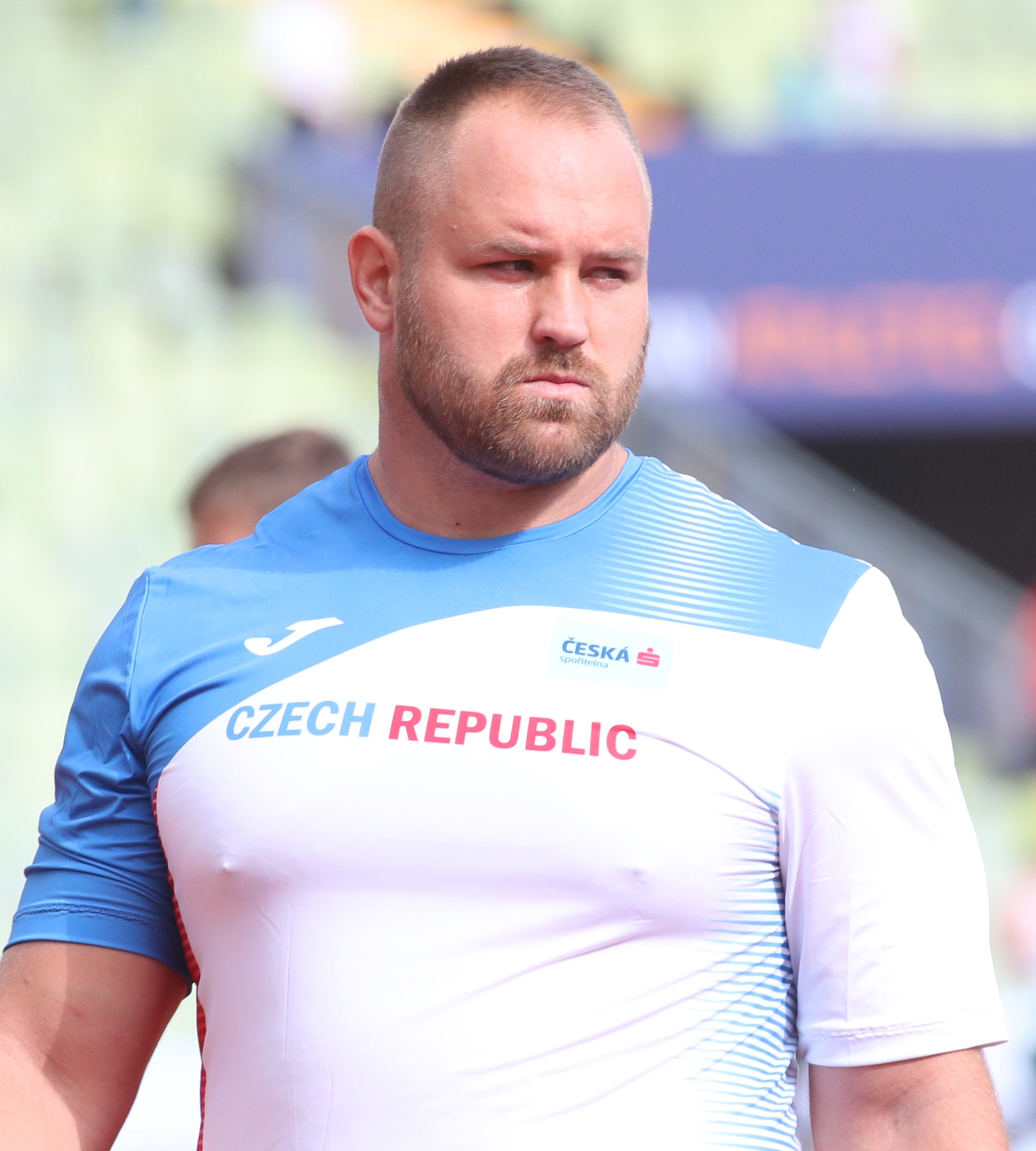
- Tomáš Staněk at the 2022 European Championships

Personal information
- Born: 13 June 1991 (age 35) Prague, Czechoslovakia
- Height: 1.90 m (6 ft 3 in)
- Weight: 125 kg (276 lb)

Sport
- Country: Czech Republic
- Sport: Athletics
- Event: Shot put

Achievements and titles
- Personal bests: 22.01 m (NR) (outdoor); 22.17 m (indoor)
Medal record
Men's athletics
Representing Czech Republic
World Indoor Championships
Bronze medal – third place	2018 Birmingham	Shot put
European Championships
Bronze medal – third place	2022 Munich	Shot put
European Indoor Championships
Gold medal – first place	2021 Toruń	Shot put
Silver medal – second place	2017 Belgrade	Shot put
Silver medal – second place	2023 Istanbul	Shot put
Bronze medal – third place	2019 Glasgow	Shot put
Bronze medal – third place	2025 Apeldoorn	Shot put

Tomáš Staněk (born 13 June 1991) is a Czech athlete specialising in the shot put. He represented his country at the 2017 World Championships, finishing fourth. He won the silver medal at the 2017 European Indoor Championships.

His personal bests in the event are 22.01 metres outdoors (Schönebeck 2017) and 22.17 indoors (Düsseldorf 2018).

== Competition record ==
Year	Competition	Venue	Position	Event	Notes
Representing the Czech Republic
2013	European U23 Championships	Tampere, Finland	5th	Shot put	19.18 m
2014	World Indoor Championships	Sopot, Poland	12th (q)	Shot put	20.06 m
2014	European Championships	Zurich, Switzerland	14th (q)	Shot put	19.61 m
2015	European Indoor Championships	Prague, Czech Republic	–	Shot put	NM
2015	World Championships	Beijing, China	19th (q)	Shot put	19.64 m
2016	World Indoor Championships	Portland, United States	16th	Shot put	19.46 m
2016	Olympic Games	Rio de Janeiro, Brazil	20th (q)	Shot put	19.76 m
2017	European Indoor Championships	Belgrade, Serbia	2nd	Shot put	21.43 m
2017	World Championships	London, United Kingdom	4th	Shot put	21.41 m
2018	World Indoor Championships	Birmingham, United Kingdom	3rd	Shot put	21.44 m
2018	European Championships	Berlin, Germany	4th	Shot put	21.16 m
2019	European Indoor Championships	Glasgow, United Kingdom	3rd	Shot put	21.25 m
2019	World Championships	Doha, Qatar	10th	Shot put	20.79 m
2021	European Indoor Championships	Toruń, Poland	1st	Shot put	21.62 m
2021	Olympic Games	Tokyo, Japan	17th (q)	Shot put	20.47 m
2022	World Indoor Championships	Belgrade, Serbia	14th	Shot put	19.93 m
2022	European Championships	Munich, Germany	3rd	Shot put	21.26 m
2023	European Indoor Championships	Istanbul, Turkey	2nd	Shot put	21.90 m
2023	World Championships	Budapest, Hungary	16th (q)	Shot put	20.41 m
2024	World Indoor Championships	Glasgow, United Kingdom	11th	Shot put	20.31 m
2024	European Championships	Rome, Italy	5th	Shot put	20.88 m
2024	Olympic Games	Paris, France	10th	Shot put	20.37 m
2025	European Indoor Championships	Apeldoorn, Netherlands	3rd	Shot put	20.75 m
2025	World Championships	Tokyo, Japan	12th	Shot put	19.91 m
2026	European Championships	Birmingham, United Kingdom	9th	Shot put	19.68 m
