= 2023 European Athletics Indoor Championships – Men's shot put =

Men's shot put at the 2023 European Athletics Indoor Championships
- Venue: Ataköy Athletics Arena
- Location: Istanbul, Turkey
- Dates: 2 March 2023 (qualification); 3 March 2023 (final)
- Competitors: 16 from 13 nations
- Winning mark: 22.06 m EL, NR

Medalists
gold medal	Zane Weir	Italy
silver medal	Tomáš Staněk	Czech Republic
bronze medal	Roman Kokoshko	Ukraine

The men's shot put event at the 2023 European Athletics Indoor Championships was held on 2 March at 19:12 (qualification) and on 3 March at 19:25 (final) local time.

== Records ==
Standing records prior to the 2023 European Athletics Indoor Championships
World record	Ryan Crouser (USA)	23.38	Pocatello, United States	18 February 2023
European record	Ulf Timmermann (GDR)	22.55	Senftenberg, East Germany	11 February 1989
Championship record	Ulf Timmermann (GDR)	22.19	Liévin, France	21 February 1987
World Leading	Ryan Crouser (USA)	23.38	Pocatello, United States	18 February 2023
European Leading	Bob Bertemes (LUX)	21.93	Kirchberg, Luxembourg	19 February 2023

== Results ==
=== Qualification ===
Qualification: Qualifying performance 21.20 (Q) or at least 8 best performers (q) advance to the Final.

Rank	Athlete	Nationality	#1	#2	#3	Result	Note
1	Zane Weir	Italy	20.70	21.46		21.46	Q, =SB
2	Filip Mihaljević	Croatia	20.40	21.20		21.20	Q
3	Leonardo Fabbri	Italy	x	x	21.17	21.17	q
4	Bob Bertemes	Luxembourg	20.92	20.49	x	20.92	q
5	Marcus Thomsen	Norway	20.71	20.45	20.02	20.71	q
6	Tomáš Staněk	Czech Republic	x	20.09	20.70	20.70	q
7	Roman Kokoshko	Ukraine	20.43	x	x	20.43	q
8	Mesud Pezer	Bosnia and Herzegovina	20.18	19.98	20.20	20.20	q
9	Andrei Toader	Romania	20.15	19.43	19.86	20.15	
10	Nick Ponzio	Italy	19.83	x	19.73	19.83	
11	Asmir Kolašinac	Serbia	x	x	19.63	19.63	
12	Francisco Belo	Portugal	x	x	19.61	19.61	
13	Giorgi Mujaridze	Georgia	18.92	19.05	18.70	19.05	SB
14	Muhamet Ramadani	Kosovo	x	17.93	17.29	17.93	NR
	Michał Haratyk	Poland	x	x	x	NM	
	Armin Sinančević	Serbia	x	x	x	NM	

=== Final ===
Rank	Athlete	Nationality	#1	#2	#3	#4	#5	#6	Result	Note
1st place, gold medalist(s)	Zane Weir	Italy	21.18	21.89	22.06	x	x	x	22.06	EL NR
2nd place, silver medalist(s)	Tomáš Staněk	Czech Republic	20.54	21.90	x	21.45	x	21.06	21.90	SB
3rd place, bronze medalist(s)	Roman Kokoshko	Ukraine	21.25	20.57	x	x	x	21.84	21.84	NR
4	Filip Mihaljević	Croatia	21.13	20.73	21.42	21.25	20.84	21.43	21.43	
5	Bob Bertemes	Luxembourg	19.88	x	x	x	21.00	x	21.00	
6	Marcus Thomsen	Norway	x	x	20.49	20.48	20.66	20.49	20.66	
7	Mesud Pezer	Bosnia and Herzegovina	x	x	19.80	x	19.94	x	19.94	
	Leonardo Fabbri	Italy	x	x	x	x	x	x	NM	
