= 2022 World Athletics Indoor Championships – Men's shot put =

Men's shot put at the 2022 World Athletics Indoor Championships
- Venue: Štark Arena
- Dates: 19 March
- Competitors: 18 from 15 nations
- Winning distance: 22.53

Medalists
gold medal	Darlan Romani	Brazil
silver medal	Ryan Crouser	United States
bronze medal	Tomas Walsh	New Zealand

The men's shot put at the 2022 World Athletics Indoor Championships took place on 19 March 2022.

== Results ==
The final was started at 19:25.

Rank	Athlete	Nationality	#1	#2	#3	#4	#5	#6	Result	Notes
1st place, gold medalist(s)	Darlan Romani	Brazil	21.74	21.79	22.53	21.31	x	22.18	22.53	CR AR
2nd place, silver medalist(s)	Ryan Crouser	United States	22.44	21.55	21.86	22.32	x	21.93	22.44	
3rd place, bronze medalist(s)	Tomas Walsh	New Zealand	22.29	x	21.78	x	x	22.31	22.31	=AR
4	Filip Mihaljević	Croatia	21.51	21.05	x	21.83	21.03	21.81	21.83	
5	Josh Awotunde	United States	20.74	21.41	21.70	x	x	x	21.70	
6	Zane Weir	Italy	21.34	x	x	x	x	21.67	21.67	NR
7	Nick Ponzio	Italy	x	21.15	x	x	20.64	21.30	21.30	
8	Mesud Pezer	Bosnia and Herzegovina	20.64	20.94	x	x	x	20.70	20.94	SB
9	Michał Haratyk	Poland	x	20.42	20.88				20.88	
10	Konrad Bukowiecki	Poland	19.79	20.79	x				20.79	
11	Asmir Kolašinac	Serbia	20.64	x	x				20.64	
12	Wictor Petersson	Sweden	20.33	x	x				20.33	
13	Bob Bertemes	Luxembourg	20.10	x	x				20.10	
14	Tomáš Staněk	Czech Republic	x	19.93	x				19.93	
15	Francisco Belo	Portugal	19.87	x	x				19.87	
16	Scott Lincoln	Great Britain	19.33	19.45	19.65				19.65	
17	Andrei Toader	Romania	19.10	19.60	19.33				19.60	
	Tajinderpal Singh Toor	India	x	x	x				NM	
