= Francisco Belo =

Portuguese shot putter (born 1991)

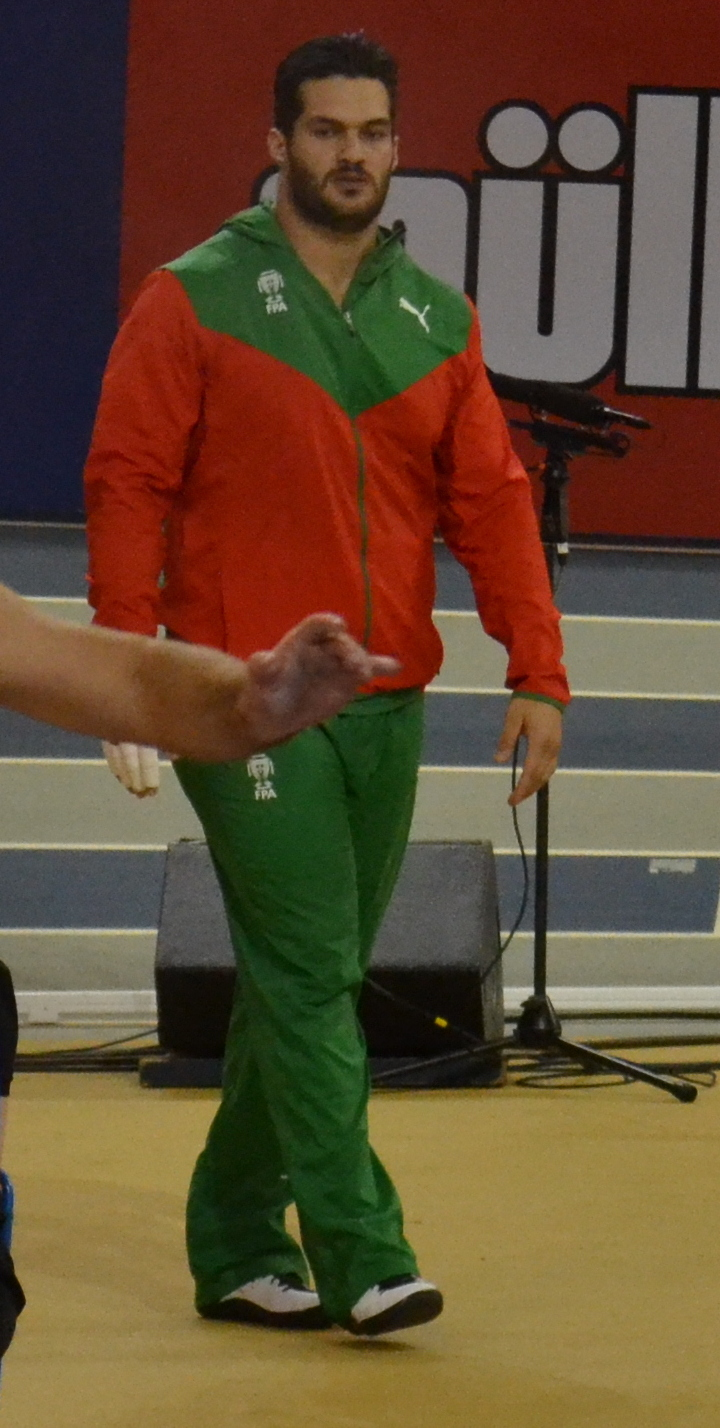
- Belo in 2019

Personal information
- Nationality: Portuguese
- Born: 27 March 1991 (age 35) Castelo Branco, Portugal
- Education: Faculdade de Medicina da Universidade de Lisboa
- Height: 1.93 m (6 ft 4 in)
- Weight: 135 kg (298 lb)

Sport
- Sport: Athletics
- Events: Shot put, discus throw
- Club: Benfica
- Coached by: Volodymyr Zinchenko

Francisco Miguel Pereira Boavida Pires Belo (born 27 March 1991) is a Portuguese athlete specialising in the shot put. He represented his country at the 2017 World Championships without qualifying for the final. In addition, he finished fourth at the 2019 European Indoor Championships.

== International competitions ==
Year	Competition	Venue	Position	Event	Notes
Representing Portugal
2010	World Junior Championships	Moncton, Canada	15th (q)	Shot put (6 kg)	18.16 m
2011	European U23 Championships	Ostrava, Czech Republic	15th (q)	Shot put	17.04 m
2013	European U23 Championships	Tampere, Finland	16th (q)	Shot put	17.63 m
2013	European U23 Championships	Tampere, Finland	25th (q)	Discus throw	50.38 m
2015	Universiade	Gwangju, South Korea	12th	Shot put	17.06 m
2015	Universiade	Gwangju, South Korea	13th	Discus throw	52.40 m
2017	European Indoor Championships	Belgrade, Serbia	15th (q)	Shot put	19.55 m
2017	European Throwing Cup	Las Palmas, Spain	3rd	Shot put	20.52 m
2017	World Championships	London, United Kingdom	29th (q)	Shot put	19.47 m
2017	Universiade	Taipei, Taiwan	1st	Shot put	20.86 m
2017	Universiade	Taipei, Taiwan	5th	Discus throw	59.78 m
2018	Mediterranean Games	Tarragona, Spain	7th	Shot put	19.39 m
2018	European Championships	Berlin, Germany	14th (q)	Shot put	19.66 m
2019	European Indoor Championships	Glasgow, United Kingdom	4th	Shot put	20.97 m
2019	European Throwing Cup	Šamorín, Slovakia	1st	Shot put	20.97 m
2019	World Championships	Doha, Qatar	32nd (q)	Shot put	19.52 m
2021	European Indoor Championships	Toruń, Poland	4th	Shot put	21.28 m
2021	Olympic Games	Tokyo, Japan	16th (q)	Shot put	20.58 m
2022	World Indoor Championships	Belgrade, Serbia	15th	Shot put	19.87 m
2023	European Indoor Championships	Istanbul, Turkey	12th (q)	Shot put	19.61 m
2023	World Championships	Budapest, Hungary	27th (q)	Shot put	19.24 m
2024	Ibero-American Championships	Cuiabá, Brazil	1st	Shot put	20.78 m
2024	European Championships	Rome, Italy	10th	Shot put	19.74 m
2024	Olympic Games	Paris, France	–	Shot put	NM

== Personal bests ==
Outdoor

- Shot put – 21.27 (Kladno 2021)
- Discus throw – 62.01 (Vagos 2017) NR

Indoor

- Shot put – 21.28 (Toruń 2021) NR
