= 2021 European Athletics Indoor Championships – Men's shot put =

The men's shot put event at the 2021 European Athletics Indoor Championships was held on 5 March at 11:18 (qualification) and at 20:35 (final) local time.

== Medalists ==
Gold	Silver	Bronze
Tomáš Staněk; Czech Republic	Michał Haratyk; Poland	Filip Mihaljević; Croatia

== Records ==
Standing records prior to the 2021 European Athletics Indoor Championships
World record	Randy Barnes (USA)	22.66	Los Angeles, United States	20 January 1989
European record	Ulf Timmermann (GDR)	22.55	Senftenberg, East Germany	11 February 1989
Championship record	Ulf Timmermann (GDR)	22.19	Liévin, France	21 February 1987
World Leading	Ryan Crouser (USA)	22.82	Fayetteville, United States	24 January 2021
European Leading	Michał Haratyk (POL)	21.83	Łódź, Poland	12 February 2021

== Results ==
=== Qualification ===
Qualification: Qualifying performance 21.00 (Q) or at least the 8 best performers (q) advance to the Final.

Rank	Athlete	Nationality	#1	#2	#3	Result	Note
1	Francisco Belo	Portugal	18.62	20.17	21.04	21.04	Q, PB
2	Michał Haratyk	Poland	20.64	21.02		21.02	Q
3	Tomáš Staněk	Czech Republic	20.97	–	r	20.97	q
4	Wictor Petersson	Sweden	19.72	20.00	20.60	20.60	q
5	Filip Mihaljević	Croatia	20.40	x	r	20.40	q
6	Mesud Pezer	Bosnia and Herzegovina	19.99	20.30	x	20.30	q
7	Armin Sinančević	Serbia	19.93	20.11	20.29	20.29	q
8	Marcus Thomsen	Norway	20.13	20.07	20.27	20.27	q
9	Bob Bertemes	Luxembourg	19.70	20.16	19.96	20.16	
10	Jakub Szyszkowski	Poland	19.74	19.75	20.12	20.12	
11	Leonardo Fabbri	Italy	x	19.96	19.77	19.96	
12	Dzmitry Karpuk	Belarus	x	18.83	19.40	19.40	
13	Giorgi Mujaridze	Georgia	x	19.22	19.18	19.22	

=== Final ===
Rank	Athlete	Nationality	#1	#2	#3	#4	#5	#6	Result	Note
1st place, gold medalist(s)	Tomáš Staněk	Czech Republic	x	20.36	21.24	x	21.62	–	21.62	SB
2nd place, silver medalist(s)	Michał Haratyk	Poland	20.89	x	21.33	21.14	21.47	21.21	21.47	
3rd place, bronze medalist(s)	Filip Mihaljević	Croatia	20.64	21.17	21.31	x	21.27	x	21.31	
4	Francisco Belo	Portugal	x	21.28	20.96	20.82	x	x	21.28	NR
5	Wictor Petersson	Sweden	20.52	x	x	20.75	20.13	x	20.75	
6	Armin Sinančević	Serbia	x	x	20.74	x	x	x	20.74	
7	Marcus Thomsen	Norway	19.74	20.25	20.28	20.16	x	20.19	20.28	
8	Mesud Pezer	Bosnia and Herzegovina	19.77	x	x	x	x	x	19.77	
