= Krzysztof Brzozowski =

Polish shot putter (born 1993)

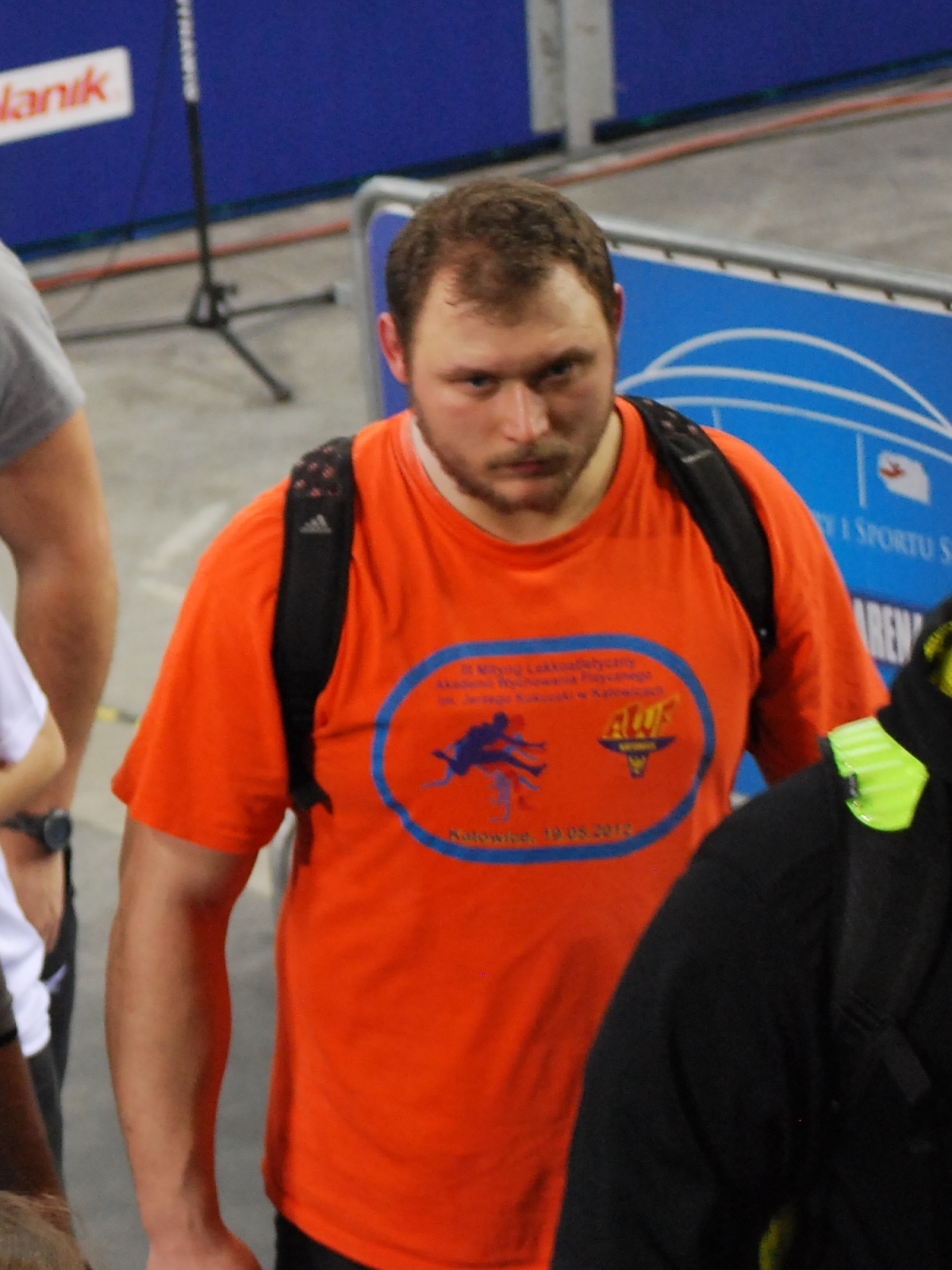
- Krzysztof Brzozowski in 2015

Personal information
- Nationality: Poland
- Born: 15 July 1993 (age 32) Katowice, Poland

Sport
- Sport: Track and field
- Event: Shot put

Achievements and titles
- Personal best(s): 7.2 kg: 19.63 m (Sosnowiec 2012) 6 kg: 21.78 m (Barcelona 2012) 5 kg: 23.23 m (Singapore 2010)
Medal record
Representing Poland
Men's athletics
World Junior Championships
Silver medal – second place	2012 Barcelona	Shot put
European Junior Championships
Gold medal – first place	2011 Tallinn	Shot put
Youth Olympic Games
Gold medal – first place	2010 Singapore	Shot put
World Youth Championships
Silver medal – second place	2009 Bressanone	Shot put

Krzysztof Brzozowski (born 15 July 1993) is a Polish shot putter.

He won a gold medal at the inaugural 2010 Summer Youth Olympics, with a then-World Youth Best of 23.23 m.

== Competition record ==
Year	Competition	Venue	Position	Event	Notes
Representing Poland
2009	World Youth Championships	Brixen, Italy	2nd	Shot put (5 kg)	20.89 m
2010	Youth Olympic Games	Singapore	1st	Shot put (5 kg)	23.23 m (WYB)
2011	European Junior Championships	Tallinn, Estonia	1st	Shot put (6 kg)	20.92 m
2012	World Junior Championships	Barcelona, Spain	2nd	Shot put (6 kg)	21.78 m (NJR)
2015	European U23 Championships	Tallinn, Estonia	10th	Shot put	18.16 m
