= Carlos Tobalina (athlete) =

Spanish shot putter (born 1985)

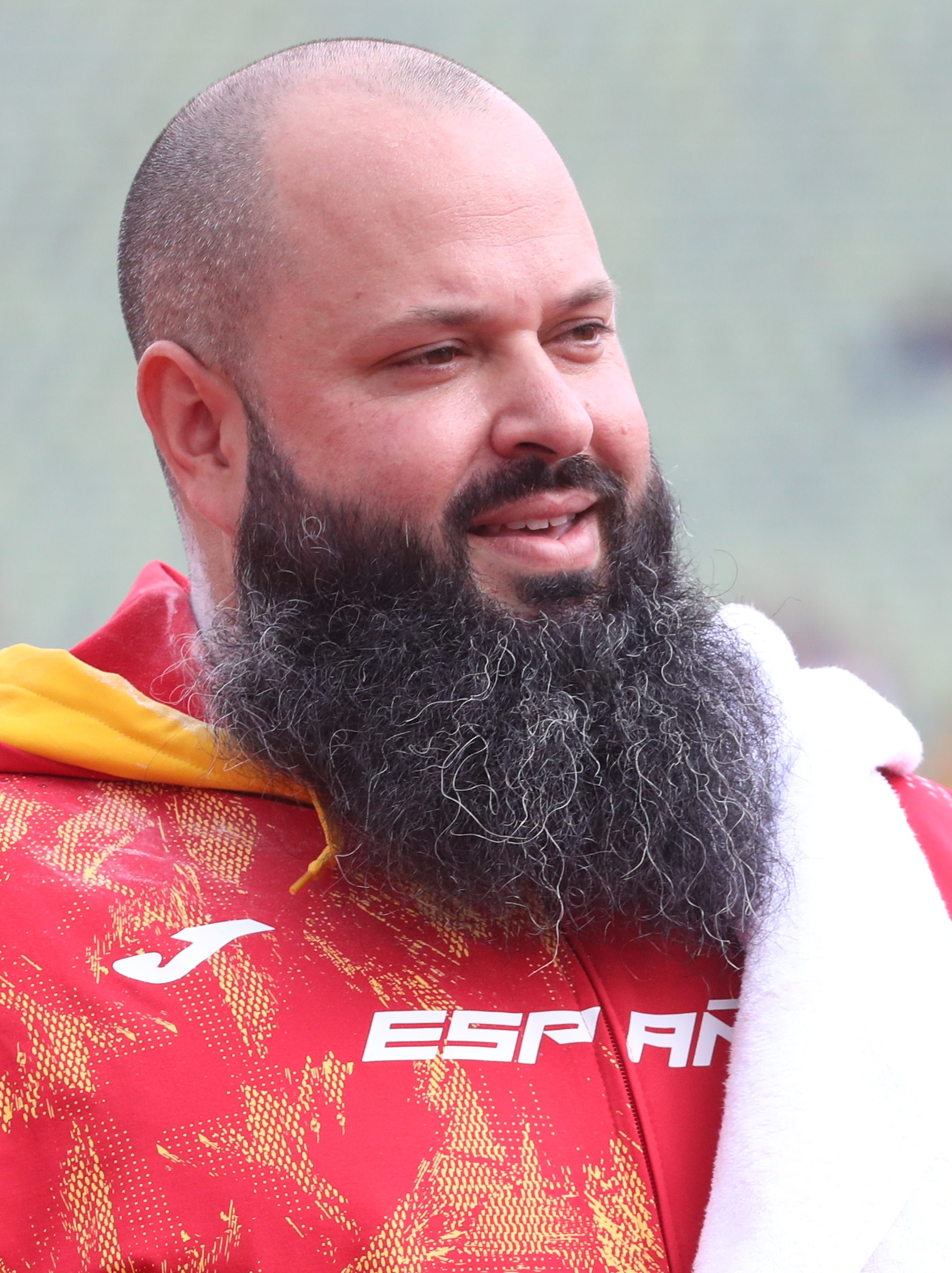
- Carlos Tobalina in 2022

Personal information
- Born: 2 August 1985 (age 40) Castro Urdiales, Spain
- Height: 1.87 m (6 ft 2 in)
- Weight: 127 kg (280 lb)

Sport
- Sport: Athletics
- Event: Shot put
- Club: FC Barcelona
- Coached by: Carlos Burón

Carlos Tobalina Aspirez (born 2 August 1985 in Barakaldo) is a Spanish athlete specialising in the shot put. He represented his country at the 2016 World Indoor Championships, finishing tenth.

His personal bests in the event are 20.32 metres outdoors (Leiria 2014) and 20.50 metres indoors (Madrid 2016).

== Competition record ==
Year	Competition	Venue	Position	Notes
Representing Spain
2012	Ibero-American Championships	Barquisimeto, Venezuela	6th	18.47 m
2014	European Championships	Zürich, Switzerland	9th	20.04 m
2015	European Indoor Championships	Prague, Czech Republic	17th (q)	19.18 m
2016	World Indoor Championships	Portland, United States	10th	19.86 m
2016	European Championships	Amsterdam, Netherlands	10th	19.85 m
2016	Olympic Games	Rio de Janeiro, Brazil	17th (q)	19.98 m
2017	European Indoor Championships	Belgrade, Serbia	13th (q)	19.83 m
2017	World Championships	London, United Kingdom	22nd (q)	19.87 m
2018	Mediterranean Games	Tarragona, Spain	8th	19.28 m
2018	European Championships	Berlin, Germany	18th (q)	19.41 m
2019	European Indoor Championships	Glasgow, United Kingdom	18th (q)	19.06 m
2022	Ibero-American Championships	La Nucía, Spain	4th	20.20 m
2022	World Championships	Eugene, United States	24th (q)	19.70 m
2022	European Championships	Munich, Germany	16th (q)	19.58 m
2023	European Games	Chorzów, Poland	10th	20.19
