= Bob Bertemes =

Luxembourgish shot putter (born 1993)

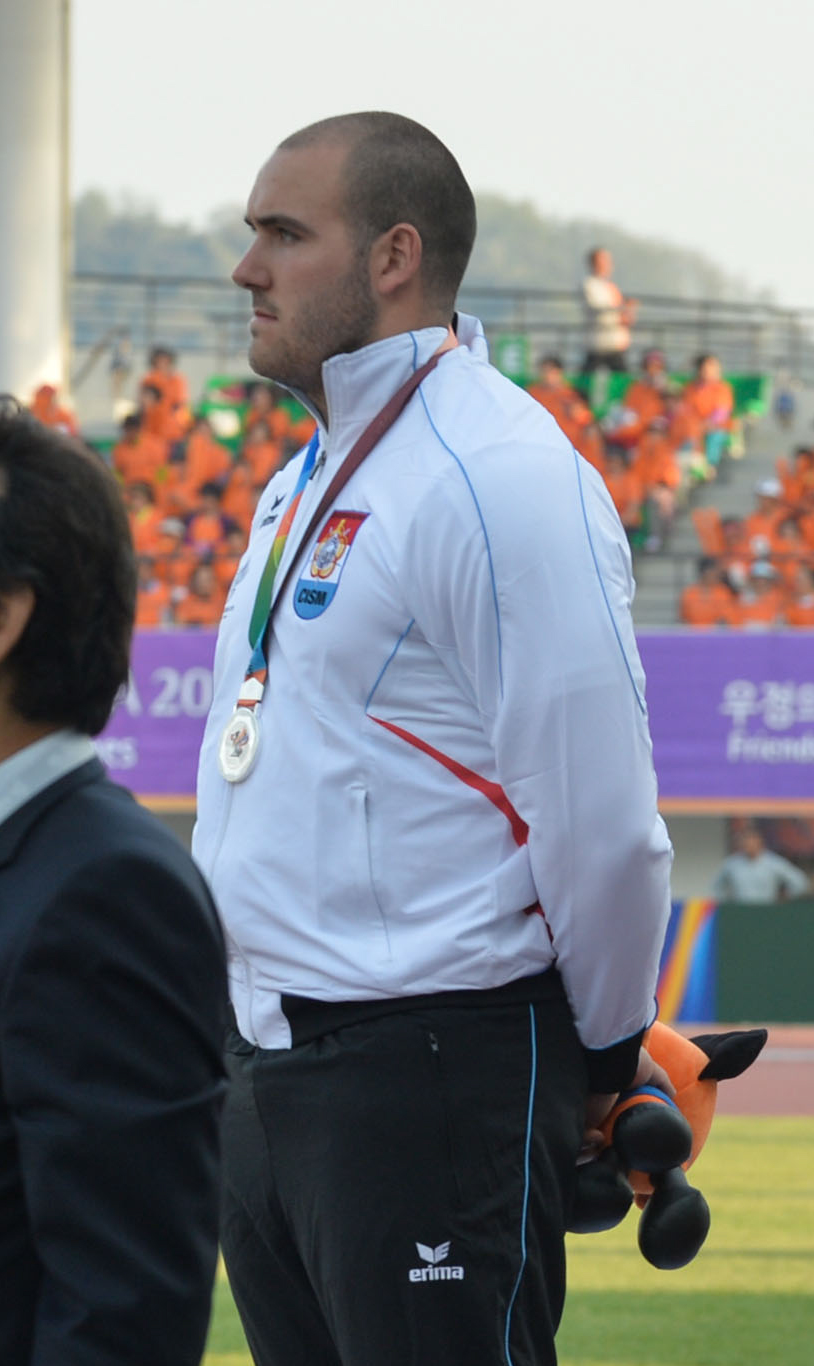
- Bob Bertemes at the 2015 Military World Games

Personal information
- Nationality: Luxembourgish
- Born: May 24, 1993 (age 33) Luxembourg City, Luxembourg
- Height: 1.87 m (6 ft 2 in)
- Weight: 118 kg (260 lb)

Sport
- Sport: Athletics
- Event: Shot put

Achievements and titles
- Personal bests: Outdoor: 22.22 m Indoor: 21.03 m

Bob Bertemes (born 24 May 1993) is a retired Luxembourgish athlete who specialised in the shot put. He finished fifth at the 2015 European Indoor Championships.

His personal bests in the event are 22.22 metres outdoors (Luxembourg City 2019) and 21.03 metres indoors (Potsdam 2019). Both are current national records.

== Competition record ==
Year	Competition	Venue	Position	Event	Notes
Representing Luxembourg
2011	Games of the Small States of Europe	Schaan, Liechtenstein	3rd	Shot put	16.75 m
2011	European Junior Championships	Tallinn, Estonia	23rd (q)	Shot put (6 kg)	17.42 m
2012	World Junior Championships	Barcelona, Spain	8th (q)	Shot put (6 kg)	19.33 m^{1}
2013	Games of the Small States of Europe	Luxembourg, Luxembourg	3rd	Shot put	17.65 m
2013	European U23 Championships	Tampere, Finland	13th (q)	Shot put	17.94 m
2013	Jeux de la Francophonie	Nice, France	4th	Shot put	18.78 m
2015	European Indoor Championships	Prague, Czech Republic	5th	Shot put	20.48 m
2015	Games of the Small States of Europe	Reykjavík, Iceland	1st	Shot put	19.11 m
2015	European U23 Championships	Tallinn, Estonia	2nd	Shot put	19.29 m
2015	World Championships	Beijing, China	14th	Shot put	19.87 m
2015	Military World Games	Mungyeong, South Korea	2nd	Shot put	19.60 m
2016	World Indoor Championships	Portland, United States	15th	Shot put	19.48 m
2016	Championships of the Small States of Europe	Marsa, Malta	1st	Shot put	19.99 m
2016	European Championships	Amsterdam, Netherlands	17th (q)	Shot put	19.39 m
2017	European Indoor Championships	Belgrade, Serbia	16th (q)	Shot put	19.47 m
2017	Jeux de la Francophonie	Abidjan, Ivory Coast	2nd	Shot put	19.55 m
2017	World Championships	London, United Kingdom	31st (q)	Shot put	19.10 m
2018	European Championships	Berlin, Germany	6th	Shot put	21.00 m
2019	European Indoor Championships	Glasgow, United Kingdom	5th	Shot put	20.70 m
2019	World Championships	Doha, Qatar	26th (q)	Shot put	19.89 m
2021	European Indoor Championships	Toruń, Poland	9th (q)	Shot put	20.16 m
2021	Olympic Games	Tokyo, Japan	21st (q)	Shot put	20.16 m
2022	World Indoor Championships	Belgrade, Serbia	13th	Shot put	20.10 m
2022	Championships of the Small States of Europe	Marsa, Malta	2nd	Discus throw	57.47 m
2022	European Championships	Munich, Germany	14th (q)	Shot put	19.77 m
2023	European Indoor Championships	Istanbul, Turkey	5th	Shot put	21.00 m
2023	Games of the Small States of Europe	Marsa, Malta	1st	Shot put	20.51 m
2023	Games of the Small States of Europe	Marsa, Malta	2nd	Discus throw	59.16 m
2023	World Championships	Budapest, Hungary	–	Shot put	NM
2024	World Indoor Championships	Glasgow, United Kingdom	12th	Shot put	20.30 m
2024	European Championships	Rome, Italy	6th	Shot put	20.86 m
2024	Olympic Games	Paris, France	17th (q)	Shot put	20.27 m

^{1}No mark in the final
