= Aliaksei Nichypar =

Belarusian shot putter (born 1993)

Personal information
- Born: 10 April 1993 (age 33)
- Education: I.P. Shamyakin State Pedagogical University
- Height: 1.93 m (6 ft 4 in)
- Weight: 135 kg (298 lb)

Sport
- Sport: Athletics
- Event: Shot put

Aliaksei Mikalayevich Nichypar (Belarusian: Аляксей Мікалаевіч Нічыпар; born 10 April 1993) is a Belarusian athlete specialising in the shot put. He represented his country at the 2017 World Championships without qualifying for the final.

His personal bests in the event are 20.52 metres outdoors (Minsk 2017) and 20.40 metres indoors (Mogilyov 2018).

== International competitions ==
Year	Competition	Venue	Position	Event	Notes
Representing Belarus
2009	World Youth Championships	Brixen, Italy	8th	Shot put (5 kg)	18.55 м m
2009	European Youth Olympic Festival	Tampere, Finland	3rd	Shot put (5 kg)	19.06 m
2012	World Junior Championships	Barcelona, Spain	21st (q)	Shot put (6 kg)	18.39 m
2013	European U23 Championships	Tampere, Finland	10th	Shot put	17.69 m
2015	European U23 Championships	Tallinn, Estonia	12th	Shot put	17.84 m
2016	European Championships	Amsterdam, Netherlands	18th (q)	Shot put	19.34 m
2017	European Indoor Championships	Belgrade, Serbia	21st (q)	Shot put	18.90 m
2017	World Championships	London, United Kingdom	28th (q)	Shot put	19.54 m
2017	Universiade	Taipei, Taiwan	4th	Shot put	20.09 m
2018	European Championships	Berlin, Germany	10th	Shot put	20.27 m
