= Maksim Afonin =

Russian shot putter

Personal information
- Born: 6 January 1992 (age 34)
- Height: 1.84 m (6 ft 0 in)
- Weight: 115 kg (254 lb)

Sport
- Sport: Athletics
- Event: Shot put
- Club: CSKA
- Coached by: Nikolay Kolodko

Maksim Sergeyevich Afonin (Russian: Максим Сергеевич Афонин; born 6 January 1992) is a Russian athlete specialising in the shot put. He competed at the 2018 World Indoor Championships as an Authorised Neutral Athlete due to Russia's ban from international competition.

His personal bests in the event are 21.07 metres outdoors (Moscow 2017) and 21.39 metres indoors (Moscow 2018).

== International competitions ==
Year	Competition	Venue	Position	Event	Notes
Representing Russia
2009	World Youth Championships	Brixen, Italy	8th	Shot put (5 kg)	18.55 м m
2009	European Youth Olympic Festival	Tampere, Finland	3rd	Shot put (5 kg)	19.06 m
2010	World Junior Championships	Moncton, Canada	23rd (q)	Shot put (6 kg)	17.09 m
2012	European Cup Winter Throwing (U23)	Bar, Montenegro	3rd	Shot put	18.73 m
2013	European Cup Winter Throwing (U23)	Castellón, Spain	3rd	Shot put	18.00 m
2013	European U23 Championships	Tampere, Finland	9th	Shot put	18.18 m
Competing as Authorised Neutral Athlete
2018	World Indoor Championships	Birmingham, United Kingdom	13th	Shot put	19.84 m
2018	European Championships	Berlin, Germany	8th	Shot put	20.68 m
2019	European Indoor Championships	Glasgow, United Kingdom	9th (q)	Shot put	20.30 m
2019	World Championships	Doha, Qatar	28th (q)	Shot put	19.82 m
