= Jakub Szyszkowski =

Polish shot putter (born 1991)

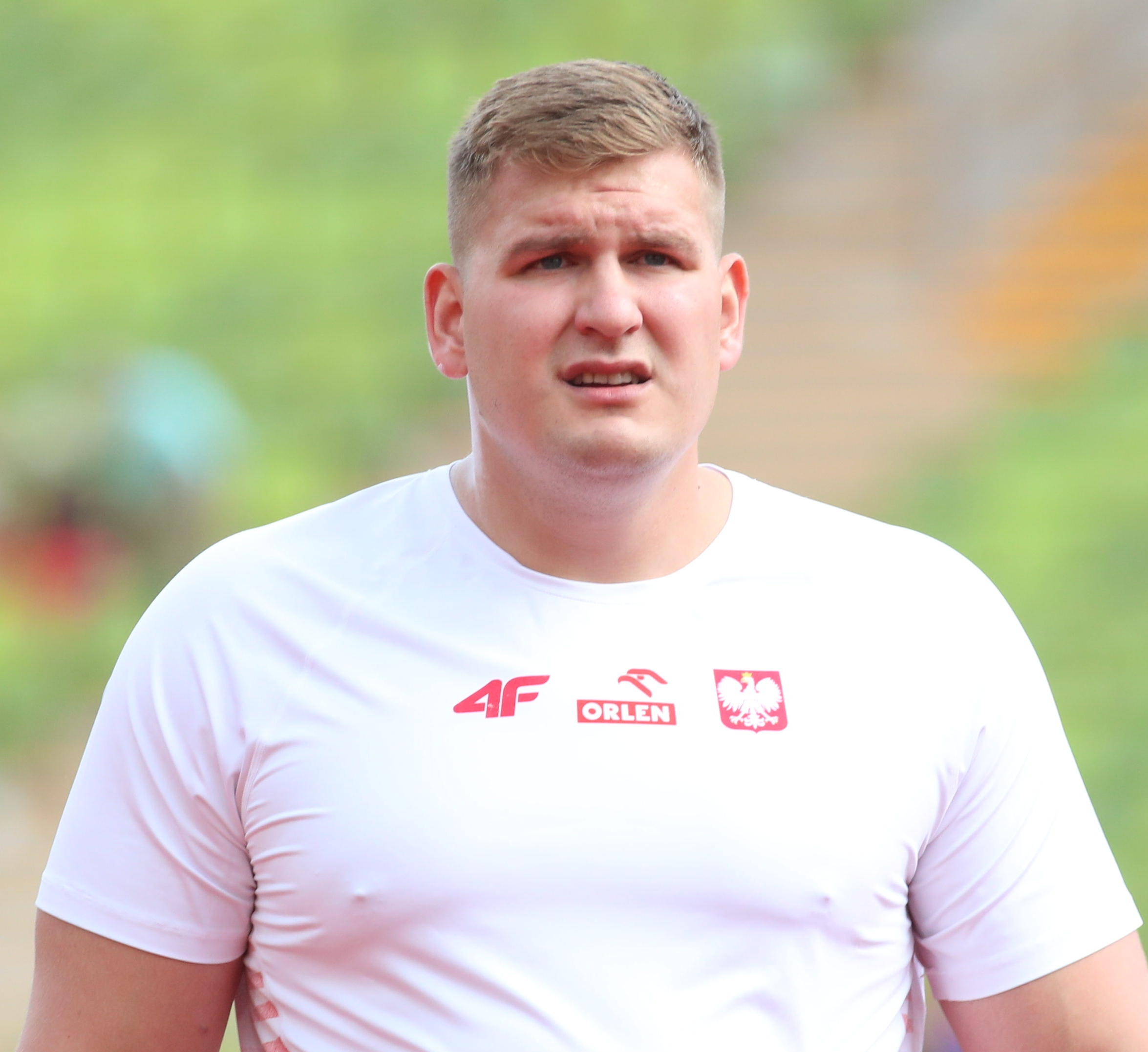
- Jakub Szyszkowski in 2022

Personal information
- Full name: Jakub Tomasz Szyszkowski
- Nationality: Polish
- Born: August 21, 1991 (age 34)
- Education: Academy of Physical Education in Wrocław
- Height: 1.87 m (6 ft 2 in)
- Weight: 105 kg (231 lb)

Sport
- Sport: Athletics
- Event: Shot put
- Club: WKS Śląsk Wrocław
Medal record
European U23 Championships
Gold medal – first place	2013 Tampere	shot put

Jakub Szyszkowski (born 21 August 1991) is a Polish athlete specialising in the shot put. He won the gold medal at the 2013 European U23 Championships. In addition, he represented his country at the 2013 World Championships without qualifying for the final.

His personal bests in the event are 20.92 metres outdoors (Wrocław 2017) and 20.55 metres indoors (Toruń 2015).

== Competition record ==
Year	Competition	Venue	Position	Event	Notes
Representing Poland
2010	World Junior Championships	Moncton, Canada	12th (q)	Shot put (6 kg)	18.74 m
2013	European U23 Championships	Tampere, Finland	1st	Shot put	19.78 m
2013	World Championships	Moscow, Russia	17th (q)	Shot put	19.36 m
2014	European Championships	Zürich, Switzerland	18th (q)	Shot put	19.46 m
2015	European Indoor Championships	Prague, Czech Republic	–	Shot put	NM
2017	World Championships	London, United Kingdom	13th (q)	Shot put	20.54 m
2017	Universiade	Taipei, Taiwan	5th	Shot put	19.87 m
2018	European Championships	Berlin, Germany	13th (q)	Shot put	19.67 m
2019	European Indoor Championships	Glasgow, United Kingdom	10th (q)	Shot put	20.28 m
2019	World Championships	Doha, Qatar	15th (q)	Shot put	20.55 m
2021	European Indoor Championships	Toruń, Poland	10th (q)	Shot put	20.12 m
2022	European Championships	Munich, Germany	21st (q)	Shot put	19.19 m
