= Osman Can Özdeveci =

Turkish shot putter (born 1995)

Personal information
- Nationality: Turkey
- Born: 23 August 1995 (age 30) Selçuklu, Konya Province, Turkey
- Height: 1.96 m (6 ft 5 in)
- Weight: 100 kg (220 lb)

Sport
- Sport: Shot put
- Club: Fenerbahçe Athletics

Achievements and titles
- Personal best: 19.70 m (2014)
Medal record
Men's athletics
Representing Turkey
European Team Championships
Silver medal – second place	2017 Lille	Shot put
Islamic Solidarity Games
Gold medal – first place	2017 Baku	Shot put

Osman Can Özdeveci (born 23 August 1995) is a Turkish track and field athlete competing in shot put. He is a member of Fenerbahçe Athletics. He studies Coaching at Adnan Menderes University in Aydın.

He won the gold medal at the 2017 Islamic Solidarity Games held in Baku, Azerbaijan.
