= Tsanko Arnaudov =

Bulgaria-born Portuguese shot putter (born 1992)

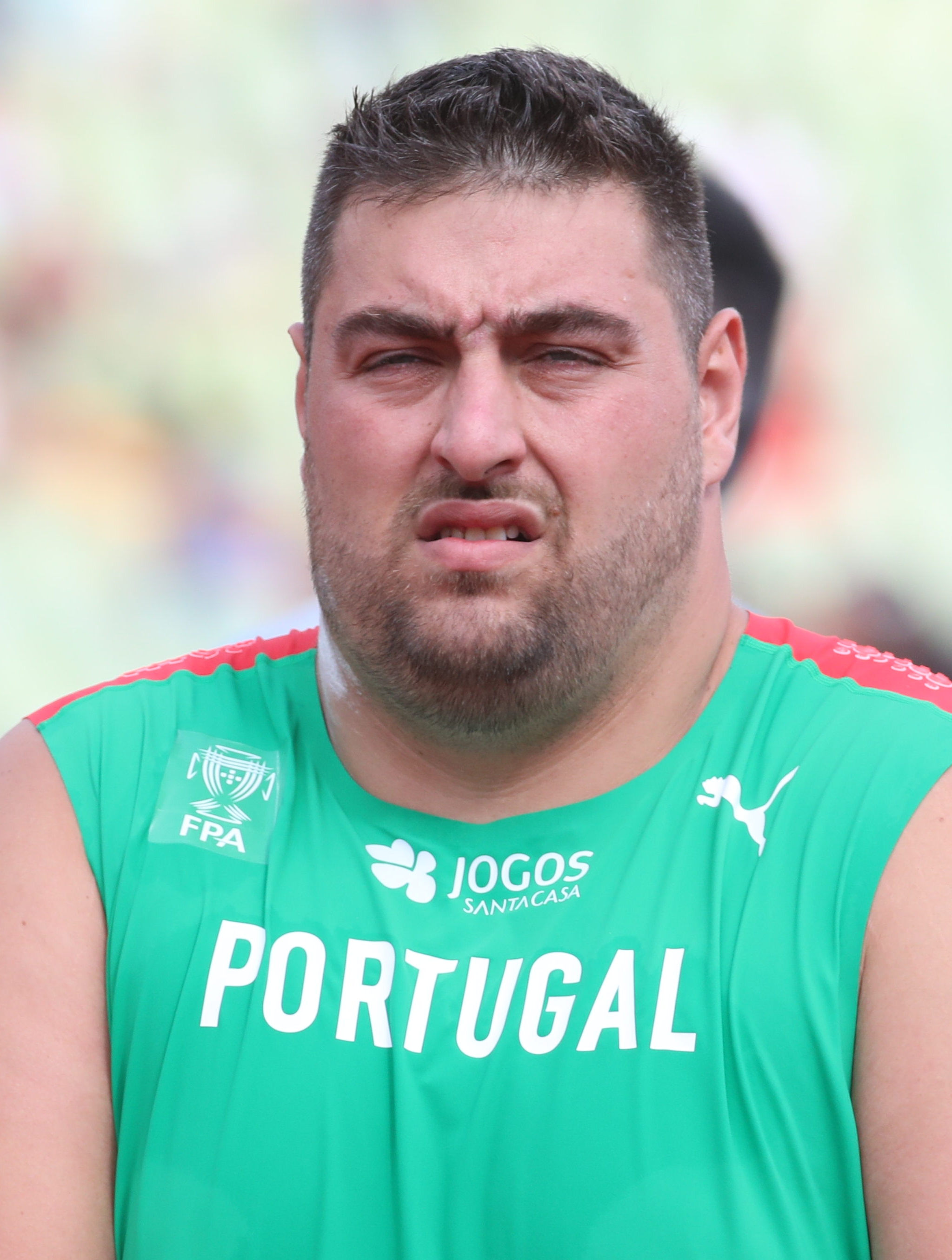
- Arnaudov in 2022

Personal information
- Full name: Tsanko Rosenov Arnaudov
- National team: Portugal
- Citizenship: Portuguese
- Born: 14 March 1992 (age 34) Bulgaria
- Years active: 2009–present
- Height: 1.98 m (6 ft 6 in)
- Weight: 155 kg (342 lb)

Sport
- Country: Portugal
- Sport: Track and field
- Event: Shot put
- Club: Sporting Portugal
- Coached by: Volodymyr Zinchenko
Medal record
Representing Portugal
Shot put
European Championships
Bronze medal – third place	2016 Amsterdam	Shot put

Tsanko Rosenov Arnaudov MedM (Bulgarian: Цанко Росенов Арнаудов; born 14 March 1992) is a Portuguese athlete who represents Sporting Portugal at club level. He holds the Portuguese record in men's shot put with 21.56 m.

== Career ==
Arnaudov was born in Bulgaria in 1992. Son of Bulgarian emigrants in Portugal since the age of 12, he acquired Portuguese citizenship on 2 July 2010 (aged 18). Since then he represented Portugal at the 2011 European Junior Championships and the 2013 European U23 Championships in shot put, but was eliminated in the qualifying round both times. In 2014 he broke the Portuguese under-23 record with a throw of 18.80 m.

Arnaudov's results improved rapidly in 2015. He first broke 20 metres in Lisbon on 17 May, and went on to break 21 metres on his next attempt in the same competition; his result of 21.06 m broke Marco Fortes's Portuguese record of 21.02 m from 2012. He broke 20 metres again in his next two meets, winning at the European Champion Clubs Cup and placing second to Jakub Szyszkowski at the FBK Games. Arnaudov made his Diamond League debut at the Herculis meeting in Monaco on 17 July, but placed last with a best put of 19.45 m. He won his first Portuguese outdoor championship title the following week, defeating Fortes with 19.79 m in a close competition.

Arnaudov represented Portugal at 2015 World Championships in Beijing. On 10 July 2016, he achieved the bronze medal with 20.59 m at the European Athletics Championships in Amsterdam. It was the first medal ever for Portugal in shot put. In 2017 he broke his own record at the European Athletics Indoor Championships in Belgrade, with a 21.08 throw, which gave him 4th place.

== Personal life ==
He is in a relationship with Portugal and Sporting Portugal sprinter Cátia Azevedo.
