= 2013 World Youth Championships in Athletics – Boys' shot put =

Boys' shot put at the 2013 World Youth Championships in Athletics
- Venue: RSC Olimpiyskiy
- Dates: 10 July (qualification & final)
- Competitors: 34
- Winning distance: 22.02 PB

Medalists
gold medal	Patrick Müller	Germany
silver medal	Henning Prüfer	Germany
bronze medal	Mohamed Magdi Hamza	Egypt

The boys' shot put at the 2013 World Youth Championships in Athletics was held on 10 July.

== Medalists ==
Gold	Silver	Bronze
Patrick Müller; Germany	Henning Prüfer; Germany	Mohamed Magdi Hamza; Egypt

== Records ==
Prior to the competition, the following records were as follows.

World Youth Best	Jacko Gill (NZL)	24.45	Auckland, New Zealand	19 December 2011
Championship Record	Jacko Gill (NZL)	24.35	Lille, France	7 July 2011
World Youth Leading	Konrad Bukowiecki (POL)	22.33	Warsaw, Poland	26 May 2013

== Qualification ==
Qualification rule: 19.40 (Q) or at least 12 best performers (q) qualified.

Rank	Group	Name	Nationality	#1	#2	#3	Result	Notes
1	B	Patrick Müller	Germany	21.25			21.25	Q
2	A	Ahamed Sherif Adel Salem	Egypt	20.36			20.36	Q
3	A	Martin Marković	Croatia	19.29	20.10		20.10	Q
4	A	Konrad Bukowiecki	Poland	18.70	19.96		19.96	Q
5	B	Mohamed Magdi Hamza	Egypt	19.12	19.93		19.93	Q
6	A	Henning Prüfer	Germany	19.81			19.81	Q
7	B	Yang Kang	China	19.58			19.58	Q
8	B	Antoine Duponchel	France	18.82	18.42	19.21	19.21	q
9	A	Gennadiy Degtyarev	Russia	19.13	18.77	x	19.13	q
10	A	Kai Jones	Great Britain	x	19.09	17.87	19.09	q
11	A	Amir Patterson	United States	19.09	x	x	19.09	q
12	B	Sebastiano Bianchetti	Italy	18.32	18.79	x	18.79	q
13	B	Shakti Solanki	India	18.72	18.34	17.90	18.72	
14	B	Shahin Jafari	Iran	18.61	18.58	x	18.61	
15	B	Nace Pleško	Slovenia	18.00	18.48	18.41	18.48	
16	A	Kiriakos Zotos	Greece	16.19	17.02	18.43	18.43	PB
17	B	Matija Carek	Croatia	18.37	17.63	x	18.37	PB
18	A	Demar Gayle	Jamaica	18.34	17.96	17.29	18.34	PB
19	A	Sebastián Lazen	Chile	17.86	18.24	x	18.24	
20	A	Maksim Padzina	Belarus	17.72	17.94	18.20	18.20	
21	B	John Kelly	Ireland	17.77	x	18.07	18.07	
22	B	Adrian Walczyński	Poland	17.94	18.06	x	18.06	
23	A	Artyom Davletov	Uzbekistan	16.91	17.96	17.66	17.96	
24	A	Benedict Chong Wong	New Zealand	17.96	17.57	x	17.96	
25	A	Hilmar Örn Jónsson	Iceland	x	17.15	17.86	17.86	
26	B	Daniel Pardo	Spain	17.37	x	x	17.37	
27	A	Leonardo Fabbri	Italy	17.14	16.97	x	17.14	
28	B	Julián Pereira	Argentina	15.36	16.64	17.07	17.07	
29	A	Nazariy Shariy	Ukraine	16.39	16.80	x	16.80	
30	B	Kenejah Williams	Trinidad and Tobago	x	16.80	x	16.80	
31	A	Cheng Yulong	China	16.58	x	x	16.58	
32	B	Pavol Ženčár	Slovakia	x	16.01	16.45	16.45	
33	B	Matthew Bloxham	New Zealand	16.10	x	x	16.10	
34	B	Yuriy Fedosov	Ukraine	14.85	x	x	14.85	

== Final ==
Rank	Name	Nationality	#1	#2	#3	#4	#5	#6	Result	Notes
1st place, gold medalist(s)	Patrick Müller	Germany	22.02	21.63	x	21.85	21.20	x	22.02	PB
2nd place, silver medalist(s)	Henning Prüfer	Germany	21.94	x	x	x	x	21.18	21.94	PB
3rd place, bronze medalist(s)	Mohamed Magdi Hamza	Egypt	18.94	19.75	20.11	20.58	20.43	19.92	20.58	
4	Martin Marković	Croatia	19.35	20.54	x	x	x	x	20.54	
5	Konrad Bukowiecki	Poland	20.10	x	x	19.43	x	x	20.10	
6	Yang Kang	China	19.92	19.74	19.18	20.04	20.03	19.38	20.04	PB
7	Antoine Duponchel	France	17.36	19.85	19.01	x	19.46	18.32	19.85	PB
8	Amir Patterson	United States	x	17.89	19.69	x	x	x	19.69	
9	Ahamed Sherif Adel Salem	Egypt	19.63	19.41	x				19.63	
10	Gennadiy Degtyarev	Russia	19.10	x	18.80				19.10	
11	Kai Jones	Great Britain	16.85	x	19.04				19.04	
	Sebastiano Bianchetti	Italy	x	x	x				NM	
