= 2013 World Youth Championships in Athletics – Boys' discus throw =

Boys' discus throw at the 2013 World Youth Championships in Athletics
- Venue: RSC Olimpiyskiy
- Dates: 13 July (qualification & final)
- Competitors: 35
- Winning distance: 67.54 WYL

Medalists
gold medal	Matthew Denny	Australia
silver medal	Henning Prüfer	Germany
bronze medal	Cheng Yulong	China

The boys' discus throw at the 2013 World Youth Championships in Athletics was held on 13 July.

== Medalists ==
Gold	Silver	Bronze
Matthew Denny; Australia	Henning Prüfer; Germany	Cheng Yulong; China

== Records ==
Prior to the competition, the following records were as follows.

World Youth Best	Mykyta Nesterenko (UKR)	77.50	Kyiv, Ukraine	19 May 2008
Championship Record	Mykyta Nesterenko (UKR)	70.67	Ostrava, Czech Republic	13 July 2007
World Youth Leading	Matthew Denny (AUS)	67.28	Brisbane, Australia	23 February 2013

== Qualification ==
Qualification rule: 58.00 (Q) or at least 12 best performers (q) qualified.

Rank	Group	Name	Nationality	#1	#2	#3	Result	Notes
1	B	Matthew Denny	Australia	65.66			65.66	Q
2	A	Domantas Poška	Lithuania	60.85			60.85	Q
3	B	Bartłomiej Stój	Poland	x	60.26		60.26	Q
4	B	Cheng Yulong	China	59.61			59.61	Q
5	A	Henning Prüfer	Germany	x	x	59.54	59.54	Q
6	A	Chen Liangyu	China	x	59.48		59.48	Q
7	B	Martin Marković	Croatia	58.81			58.81	Q
8	A	Bence Halász	Hungary	57.25	57.79	x	57.79	q
9	B	Giulio Anesa	Italy	54.96	x	57.61	57.61	q, PB
10	B	Reno Tuufuli	United States	56.04	x	57.35	57.35	q
11	A	Oskari Perälampi	Finland	56.93	x	x	56.93	q
12	A	Kyriakos Zotos	Greece	x	55.96	56.76	56.76	q
13	B	Johan Scholtz	South Africa	x	56.31	56.41	56.41	PB
14	B	Marko Perić	Serbia	55.56	53.33	52.61	55.56	PB
15	A	Evgeniy Kozyrev	Russia	x	x	55.01	55.01	
16	A	Amir Patterson	United States	54.53	54.67	x	54.67	
17	B	Ahmed Sherif Adel Salem	Egypt	54.62	52.78	x	54.62	
18	B	Samiuela Ulufonua	New Zealand	x	52.58	54.15	54.15	
19	A	Artjom Nikitin	Estonia	53.86	x	51.62	53.86	
20	B	Thor Olav Rosvold	Norway	51.42	53.34	x	53.34	
21	B	Eduardo Espín	Ecuador	52.13	52.73	53.25	53.25	
22	A	Charlie Gamble	New Zealand	53.11	x	x	53.11	
23	A	Sven van Niekerk	South Africa	52.78	x	51.52	52.78	
24	A	Mohamed Magdi Hamza	Egypt	49.03	52.56	x	52.56	
25	B	Bohdan Myronenko	Ukraine	50.97	46.80	52.21	52.21	
26	A	Pavol Žencár	Slovakia	51.68	50.13	51.96	51.96	
27	A	Vladyslav Podavalov	Ukraine	50.89	50.94	51.70	51.70	
28	A	Jakob Gardenkrans	Sweden	49.94	51.12	x	51.12	
29	B	Douglas Borges	Brazil	50.32	49.03	50.34	50.34	
30	A	Davi Ferreira Junior	Brazil	45.25	x	39.10	45.25	
	A	Drexel Maycock	Bahamas	x	x	x	NM	
	A	Marco Primaveri	Italy	x	x	x	NM	
	B	Nace Pleško	Slovenia	x	x	x	NM	
	B	Tony Zeuke	Germany	x	x	x	NM	
	B	Viktar Trus	Belarus	x	x	x	NM	

== Final ==
Rank	Name	Nationality	#1	#2	#3	#4	#5	#6	Result	Notes
1st place, gold medalist(s)	Matthew Denny	Australia	64.63	59.10	x	67.54	65.38	64.80	67.54	WYL
2nd place, silver medalist(s)	Henning Prüfer	Germany	65.62	64.35	x	x	63.35	x	65.62	
3rd place, bronze medalist(s)	Cheng Yulong	China	62.29	57.53	x	61.04	62.80	61.63	62.80	PB
4	Chen Liangyu	China	59.63	60.75	60.15	61.11	59.59	56.57	61.11	
5	Bartłomiej Stój	Poland	x	59.57	x	x	60.74	x	60.74	
6	Domantas Poška	Lithuania	54.85	57.81	x	54.67	56.58	60.73	60.73	
7	Reno Tuufuli	United States	53.75	59.90	x	54.89	57.37	56.85	59.90	PB
8	Bence Halász	Hungary	x	55.71	57.83	x	x	x	57.83	
9	Martin Marković	Croatia	x	56.32	56.52				56.52	
10	Kyriakos Zotos	Greece	48.55	49.07	55.22				55.22	
11	Giulio Anesa	Italy	x	52.91	x				52.91	
	Oskari Perälampi	Finland							DNS	
