= 2022 European Athletics Championships – Men's discus throw =

Men's discus throw at the 2022 European Athletics Championships
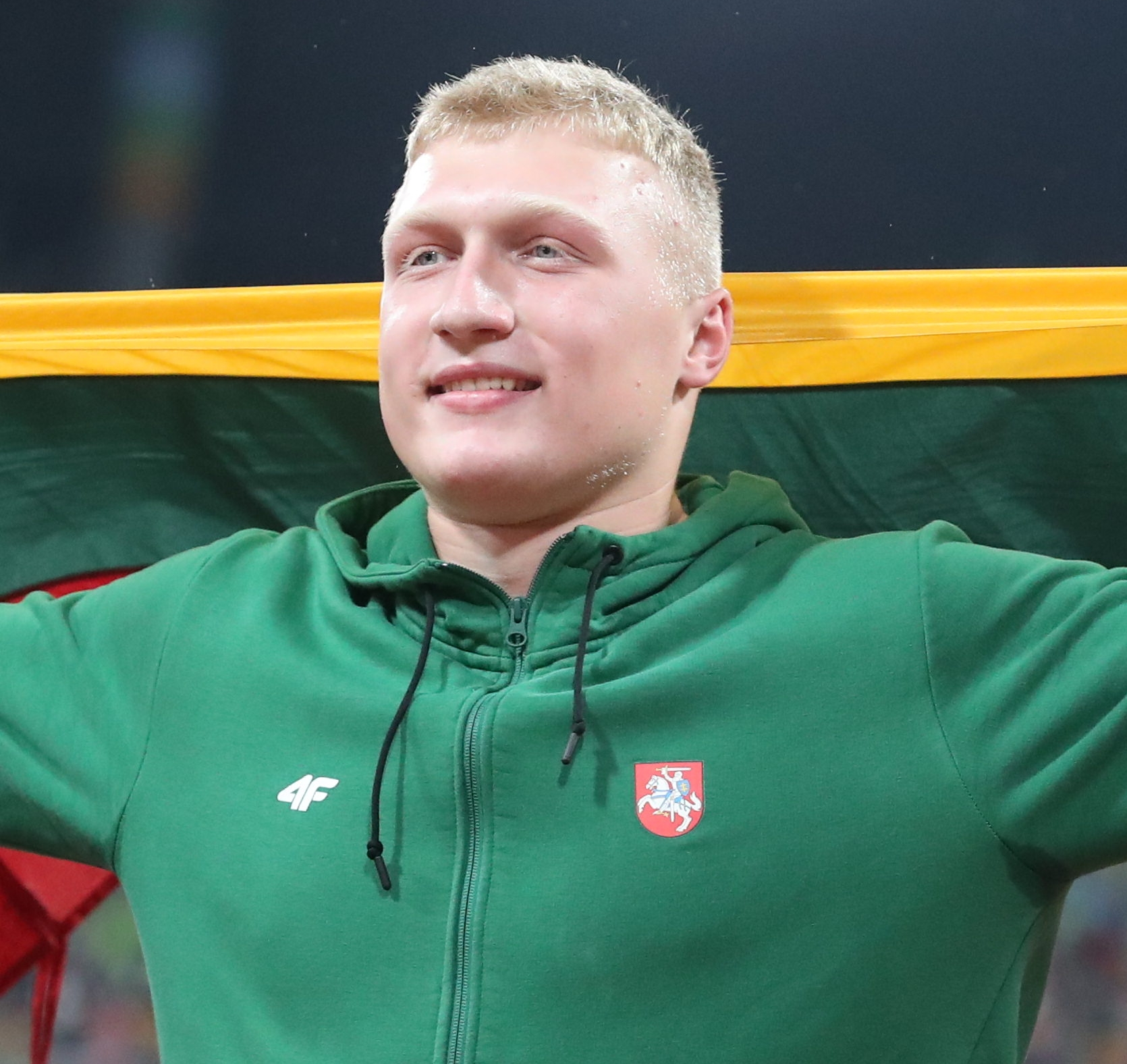
- Venue: Olympiastadion
- Location: Munich
- Dates: August 17 (qualification); August 19 (final)
- Competitors: 25 from 18 nations
- Winning distance: 69.78

Medalists
| gold medal | Mykolas Alekna | Lithuania |
| silver medal | Kristjan Čeh | Slovenia |
| bronze medal | Lawrence Okoye | Great Britain |

The men's discus throw at the 2022 European Athletics Championships took place at the Olympiastadion on 17 and 19 August.

== Records ==
Standing records prior to the 2022 European Athletics Championships
| World record | Jürgen Schult (GDR) | 74.08 m | Neubrandenburg, East Germany | 6 June 1986 |
| European record | Jürgen Schult (GDR) | 74.08 m | Neubrandenburg, East Germany | 6 June 1986 |
| Championship record | Piotr Małachowski (POL) | 68.87 m | Barcelona, Spain | 1 August 2010 |
| World Leading | Daniel Ståhl (SWE) | 71.47 m | Uppsala, Sweden | 21 June 2022 |
| Europe Leading | Daniel Ståhl (SWE) | 71.47 m | Uppsala, Sweden | 21 June 2022 |

== Schedule ==
| Date | Time | Round |
|---|---|---|
| 17 August 2022 | 12:20, 13:35 | Qualification |
| 19 August 2022 | 20:20 | Final |

All times are local times (UTC+2)

== Results ==
=== Qualification ===
Qualification: 66.00 m (Q) or best 12 performers (q).

| Rank | Group | Name | Nationality | #1 | #2 | #3 | Result | Note |
|---|---|---|---|---|---|---|---|---|
| 1 | A | Kristjan Čeh | Slovenia | 69.06 | | | 69.06 | Q, CR |
| 2 | B | Andrius Gudžius | Lithuania | 66.70 | | | 66.70 | Q |
| 3 | B | Daniel Ståhl | Sweden | 66.39 | | | 66.39 | Q |
| 4 | A | Mykolas Alekna | Lithuania | 63.91 | 61.82 | 65.48 | 65.48 | q |
| 5 | B | Lukas Weißhaidinger | Austria | 62.27 | 65.48 | x | 65.48 | q |
| 6 | B | Alin Firfirică | Romania | 64.17 | x | 60.35 | 64.17 | q |
| 7 | B | Henrik Janssen | Germany | 58.56 | 62.60 | x | 62.60 | q |
| 8 | B | Lawrence Okoye | Great Britain | 60.22 | 62.56 | x | 62.56 | q |
| 9 | B | Oskar Stachnik | Poland | 62.52 | 60.62 | x | 62.52 | q |
| 10 | A | Simon Pettersson | Sweden | x | 62.39 | x | 62.39 | q |
| 11 | B | Apostolos Parellis | Cyprus | 60.34 | 61.95 | 60.56 | 61.95 | q |
| 12 | B | Guðni Valur Guðnason | Iceland | 61.10 | 61.80 | 61.12 | 61.80 | q |
| 13 | A | Róbert Szikszai | Hungary | 61.29 | 61.32 | x | 61.32 | |
| 14 | A | Nicholas Percy | Great Britain | 60.97 | 60.26 | 61.26 | 61.26 | |
| 15 | A | Philip Milanov | Belgium | | 60.43 | 61.04 | 61.04 | |
| 16 | A | Ola Stunes Isene | Norway | x | x | 60.55 | 60.55 | |
| 17 | A | Robert Urbanek | Poland | | 60.17 | 60.47 | 60.47 | |
| 18 | A | Martin Marković | Croatia | 60.30 | 57.46 | 59.04 | 60.30 | |
| 19 | B | Ruben Rolvink | Netherlands | 56.33 | x | 60.12 | 60.12 | |
| 20 | B | János Huszák | Hungary | 59.18 | 59.99 | x | 59.99 | |
| 21 | A | Danijel Furtula | Montenegro | x | x | 59.10 | 59.10 | |
| 22 | B | Marek Bárta | Czech Republic | 53.77 | 58.37 | 58.10 | 58.37 | |
| 23 | A | Mykyta Nesterenko | Ukraine | 57.59 | x | x | 57.59 | |
| 24 | A | Torben Brandt | Germany | 56.33 | x | x | 56.33 | |
| | B | Sven Martin Skagestad | Norway | x | x | x | NM | |
| | A | Martin Wierig | Germany | DNS | | | | |

=== Final ===
| Rank | Name | Nationality | #1 | #2 | #3 | #4 | #5 | #6 | Result | Note |
|---|---|---|---|---|---|---|---|---|---|---|
| 1st place, gold medalist(s) | Mykolas Alekna | Lithuania | 66.67 | 67.26 | 66.82 | x | 69.78 | 66.18 | 69.78 | CR |
| 2nd place, silver medalist(s) | Kristjan Čeh | Slovenia | x | 67.62 | 67.81 | 67.64 | 68.28 | x | 68.28 | |
| 3rd place, bronze medalist(s) | Lawrence Okoye | Great Britain | 67.14 | 65.84 | 64.11 | x | 60.51 | 64.71 | 67.14 | SB |
| 4 | Simon Pettersson | Sweden | 67.12 | x | x | x | 63.82 | x | 67.12 | |
| 5 | Daniel Ståhl | Sweden | 66.39 | 65.80 | 64.76 | 63.42 | 65.94 | 66.00 | 66.39 | |
| 6 | Andrius Gudžius | Lithuania | | 65.17 | x | x | 63.31 | 65.40 | 65.40 | |
| 7 | Alin Firfirică | Romania | 64.35 | x | 64.32 | 62.69 | 63.01 | 62.83 | 64.35 | |
| 8 | Apostolos Parellis | Cyprus | 63.32 | 62.23 | 62.13 | 62.39 | 60.70 | 59.36 | 63.32 | |
| 9 | Lukas Weißhaidinger | Austria | x | x | 63.02 | | | | 63.02 | |
| 10 | Henrik Janssen | Germany | x | 58.21 | 61.11 | | | | 61.11 | |
| 11 | Guðni Valur Guðnason | Iceland | x | x | 61.00 | | | | 61.00 | |
| 12 | Oskar Stachnik | Poland | x | x | 60.36 | | | | 60.36 | |
