= Charlie Gamble =

New Zealand rugby union player (born 1996)

- Born: Charles Gamble; 25 April 1996 (age 30) Christchurch, Canterbury, New Zealand
- Height: 185 cm (6 ft 1 in)
- Weight: 107 kg (236 lb)
- School: St Bede's College, Christchurch

Rugby union career
- Position(s): Flanker, Number 8
- Current team: JR East Green Warriors
Youth career
- –2013: St Bede's College
- 2014–2016: Crusaders Academy
- 2015–2016: Canterbury U19
Amateur team(s)
Years	Team	Apps	(Points)
2018	Petersham		
2019–2025	Eastern Suburbs	29	(30)
2026	Gordon		
Senior career
Years	Team	Apps	(Points)
2018–2019	Sydney	5	(10)
2020–2026	Waratahs	67	(30)
2026–	JR East Green Warriors	0	(0)
- Correct as of 17 June 2026
International career
Years	Team	Apps	(Points)
2025	First Nations & Pasifika XV	1	(0)
- Sports career
- Country: New Zealand
- Sport: Track and field
- Events: Shot put; Discus throw

Sports achievements and titles
- Personal bests: 48.10 m (Discus throw); 13.22 m (Shot put)

Charles Gamble (born 25 April 1996) is a New Zealand professional rugby union player who currently plays as a flanker for Japan Rugby League One, Division 2 club Green Warriors Tokatsu. Formerly a youth track and field athlete, Gamble played most of his professional career for the New South Wales Waratahs in the Super Rugby, Gamble's playing position is typically openside flanker (No. 7), however he has been deployed across the back row.

== Early life and athletics ==
Gamble was born in Christchurch, Canterbury, New Zealand in 1996. He attended St Bede's College, Christchurch and represented their 1st XV before leaving school in 2013.

In his youth, Gamble was a track and field athlete, specialising in shot put and discus throw. Gamble represented New Zealand in athletics, and was notably a competitor at the Australian Youth Olympic Festival (AYOF) in 2013 and the IAAF World Youth Championships in Athletics in 2013. The latter event, which took place in Donetsk, Ukraine, saw Gamble finish 18th in the heats of the boys' discus throw. As at 2020, Gamble held the St Bede's College Athletic record for 5 kg shot put in under-14s and under-19s age groups and 1.25 kg discus throw in under-14s and under-16s age groups.

== Career ==
=== Early career ===
Gamble played his early rugby for St Bede's College, playing his first match for the school at 14-years-old and being named Man of the Match. He spent a total of three years with the school's 1st XV before leaving in 2013 and took up an invitation to the Crusaders Academy. Gamble played for the region's under-19 side (Canterbury) and played openside flanker for the Crusaders' "B" team, known as the Crusaders Knights.

The 2015/16 Crusaders Academy cohort featured notable peers such as George Bridge and Braydon Ennor. Gamble was then called up to the New Zealand U20 team under coach Scott Robertson. He played in a trial match with the side, however was not called up again, and did not earn an international cap for the team.

=== Senior career ===
After a long-term foot injury prevented Gamble from playing rugby, he contemplated a return to athletics. After allegedly putting his CV on a rugby website, Gamble was approached by the "subbies" club Petersham in Sydney alongside a part-time delivery job. Gamble stated that he had not lived anywhere outside of Christchurch and left for Sydney within two weeks.

Gamble was Petersham's first team openside flanker for 2018. The team, whom were the Kentwell Cup defending champions, won the premiership in 2018. Following a highly successful season with Petersham, Gamble was swiftly headhunted by Eastern Suburbs after head coach Pauli Taumoepeau sought reinforcements in the back-row for his injury-depleted squad, which had also suffered the retirement of first-choice flanker Rowan Perry. While there, Gamble established himself in the starting lineup and quickly emerged as one of the standout performers in the 2019 Shute Shield season.

In August 2019, Gamble was named in the Sydney 33-man squad ahead of the 2019 National Rugby Championship (NRC). He made his formal debut for Sydney on 14 September 2019 (Round 3) against Queensland Country. Scoring in the first two minutes of the match, Gamble earned a score assist in the first half in an overall dominating performance from the team. Winning 47–26,

Gamble was credited by the Green and Gold Rugby (GAGR) blog for his outstanding performance and declared him a "rising star". Gamble followed up this performance with another appearance in the subsequent round, which culminated in a heavy 76–29 defeat to the Fijian Drua. Over the course of the 2019 National Rugby Championship season, he made a total of five appearances for Sydney. That year, Sydney concluded the competition at the bottom of the standings, earning the wooden spoon.

=== Waratahs ===
In October 2019, the New South Wales Waratahs announced the signing of Charlie Gamble on a one-year contract ahead of the 2020 Super Rugby season. Gamble was not a part of the team that played in the cancelled 2020 season between January and March 2020 or the newly created Super Rugby AU for the remainder of 2020.

Gamble made his Waratahs debut on 2 April 2021 against the ACT Brumbies at the Sydney Cricket Ground. Debuting in Round 7 of the 2021 Super Rugby AU season, Gamble came on as a substitute in the 61st minute, replacing openside flanker Carlo Tizzano. The Waratahs lost at home 22–24. Gamble featured in two additional fixtures during the 2021 Super Rugby AU season, a campaign in which the Waratahs endured a winless run and ultimately finished at the bottom of the table.

In the ensuing Super Rugby Trans-Tasman competition (2021), which introduced cross-border fixtures against New Zealand team, he was named as the starting openside flanker in two of the Waratahs' five matches, a first for Gamble with the Waratahs. Ultimately, the team continued to struggle, as they extended their winless streak and once again finished in last place. In 2022, Gamble became a first-team choice in the Waratahs' back-row, securing the starting role at openside flanker in fourteen of the team's fifteen fixtures during the Super Rugby Pacific season. His performances did not go unnoticed: he was named the Waratahs' Forward of the Season, and prompted The Sydney Morning Herald's Iain Payten to remark in April: "Such was the impact of Gamble's form that [Michael] Hooper's absence was scarcely felt. Even upon the Wallabies captain's return, head coach Darren Coleman was compelled to shift Gamble to the No. 6 jersey, a testament to the fact that he had been NSW's standout performer in nearly every match."

In 2023, Gamble's involvement was curtailed during a season in which the Waratahs were heavily impacted by injuries across the squad. He started in two of the opening four matches of the Super Rugby campaign, but a shoulder injury sustained in Round 4 sidelined him until Round 9. Upon his return, Gamble primarily featured as a substitute, with limited minutes overall making for a disrupted and injury-stricken season for the team.

In 2023 Gamble signed a one-year contract extension with the Waratahs.

Despite a dismal 2024 Super Rugby Pacific season for the Waratahs, whom finished last on the ladder with just two wins from fourteen matches, Gamble re-established himself as the team's starting openside flanker, following the retirement of the former captain Michael Hooper in late 2023. Gamble stepped into a key role, starting in twelve of the team's fourteen fixtures and contributing two tries over the course of the season, and also underwent surgery to treat a leg laceration early in the teams campaign in a squad plagued by injuries.

Gamble returned to the Eastern Suburbs in September 2024 to play in the Shute Shield Grand Final, where he played a key role in helping the club secure its first premiership in 55 years. His leadership qualities were further recognised during the Waratahs' 2025 pre-season tour of Japan in November 2024, where he was named co-captain, alongside Hugh Sinclair, for their match against the Kubota Spears.

In 2024 Gamble signed a two-year contract with the Waratahs.

2025 marked another standout year for Gamble, who played a pivotal role in a revitalised Waratahs side. Starting in eleven of the team's fourteen regular-season matches, he amassed an impressive 140 tackles and secured nine turnovers. While the Waratahs ultimately fell short of a finals berth, the team showed marked improvement under new head coach Dan McKellar, with Gamble emerging as one of their most dependable performers. Gamble delivered a standout performance in the post-season clash against the touring British & Irish Lions; playing the full 80 minutes at Sydney Football Stadium, he recorded 12 tackles with a perfect 100% success rate and effected four turnovers, showcasing his breakdown expertise in a hard-fought 10–21 defeat. His impact was such that teammate Hugh Sinclair publicly stated Gamble had done enough to warrant selection for the national squad. RugbyPass analyst John Ferguson echoed that sentiment in his post-match review, writing: "Gamble is the first top-tier openside flanker the Lions have faced on their tour — and it showed." He went on to note: "Wallabies coach Joe Schmidt would've liked what he saw, and he could do far worse than bring Gamble into the national camp should injury affect his flanker stocks."

In March 2026, The Sydney Morning Herald reported that Gamble, who was in his last year contract with the Waratahs, was likely to leave the team at the conclusion of the season. Gamble stated that he was open to everything, but having not been selected for the Wallabies, had found keen interest from the Japanese Rugby League One (JRLO) clubs. The Waratahs later confirmed in June that Gamble was one of nine players to depart the club at the end of the season.

=== Green Warriors Tokatsu ===
After exiting the Waratahs, Gamble joined the JR East Green Warriors Tokatsu in the second division of the Japan Rugby League One, being confirmed as their latest signing in August 2026.

== Personal life ==
Gamble is of Tongan descent. In February 2025, ahead of the 2025 Super Rugby season's Culture Round, Gamble wrote an article in Rugby.com.au about his pride of ancestry (Tonga, New Zealand) and how the sport of rugby connects people through its diversity of cultures.
