= 2014 World Junior Championships in Athletics – Men's shot put =

The men's shot put event at the 2014 World Junior Championships in Athletics was held in Eugene, Oregon, USA, at Hayward Field on 24 July. A 6 kg (junior implement) shot was used.

== Medalists ==
Gold	Konrad Bukowiecki; Poland
Silver	Denzel Comenentia; Netherlands
Bronze	Braheme Days; United States

== Results ==
=== Final ===
24 July
Start time: 18:04 Temperature: 23 °C Humidity: 47 %
End time: 19:03 Temperature: 22 °C Humidity: 46 %

Rank	Name	Nationality	Attempts						Result	Notes
Rank	Name	Nationality	1	2	3	4	5	6	Result	Notes
1st place, gold medalist(s)	Konrad Bukowiecki	Poland	21.17	22.06	22.01	x	x	x	22.06	WJL
2nd place, silver medalist(s)	Denzel Comenentia	Netherlands	x	18.68	20.17	x	18.90	19.16	20.17	PB
3rd place, bronze medalist(s)	Braheme Days	United States	20.01	x	19.28	19.25	x	x	20.01	
4	Mohamed Magdi Hamza Khalifa	Egypt	19.09	19.50	18.85	x	19.69	19.85	19.85	PB
5	Osman Can Özdeveci	Turkey	19.30	19.21	19.58	19.32	x	19.07	19.58	NJR
6	Martin Marković	Croatia	18.75	19.18	19.57	x	x	x	19.57	PB
7	Amir Ali Patterson	United States	17.98	19.20	18.23	17.93	18.64	18.47	19.20	
8	Mostafa Amr Ahmed Ahmed Hassan	Egypt	19.20	x	x	x	x	x	19.20	
9	Andrei Toader	Romania	18.02	18.44	19.18				19.18	
10	Nace Pleško	Slovenia	19.15	x	18.84				19.15	
11	Henning Prüfer	Germany	18.26	19.01	x				19.01	
12	Patrick Müller	Germany	x	19.00	18.98				19.00	

=== Qualifications ===
24 July
With qualifying standard of 19.25 (Q) or at least the 12 best performers (q) advance to the Final

==== Summary ====
Rank	Name	Nationality	Result	Notes
1	Mostafa Amr Ahmed Ahmed Hassan	Egypt	19.84	Q
2	Braheme Days	United States	19.61	Q
3	Mohamed Magdi Hamza Khalifa	Egypt	19.55	Q PB
4	Patrick Müller	Germany	19.38	Q
5	Denzel Comenentia	Netherlands	19.33	Q
6	Konrad Bukowiecki	Poland	19.30	Q
7	Martin Marković	Croatia	19.14	q
8	Henning Prüfer	Germany	19.14	q
9	Osman Can Özdeveci	Turkey	19.12	q
10	Nace Pleško	Slovenia	19.05	q
11	Amir Ali Patterson	United States	18.88	q
12	Andrei Toader	Romania	18.83	q
13	Jan Parol	Poland	18.62	
14	Willy Vicaut	France	18.48	
15	Valdivino dos Santos	Brazil	18.45	
16	Pavlo Drach	Ukraine	18.23	
17	Nicolai Ceban	Moldova	18.15	
18	Maurits Damsteegt	Netherlands	17.90	
19	Alin Alexandru Firfirica	Romania	17.55	
20	Demir Kolarević	Croatia	17.35	
21	Andrejs Samburs	Latvia	17.24	
22	Mario Alberto Lozano	Mexico	16.85	
	Blaž Zupančič	Slovenia	NM	
	Gian Piero Ragonesi	Italy	NM	
	Julius Malotkinas	Lithuania	NM	
	Sebastiano Bianchetti	Italy	NM	

==== Details ====
With qualifying standard of 19.25 (Q) or at least the 12 best performers (q) advance to the Final

===== Group A =====
24 July
Start time; 10:15 Temperature: 16 °C Humidity: 68 %
End time: 10:47 Temperature: 16 °C Humidity: 68 %

Rank	Name	Nationality	Attempts			Result	Notes
Rank	Name	Nationality	1	2	3	Result	Notes
1	Braheme Days	United States	x	19.61		19.61	Q
2	Mohamed Magdi Hamza Khalifa	Egypt	x	x	19.55	19.55	Q PB
3	Konrad Bukowiecki	Poland	18.70	19.30		19.30	Q
4	Henning Prüfer	Germany	18.71	x	19.14	19.14	q
5	Nace Pleško	Slovenia	x	19.05	18.25	19.05	q
6	Andrei Toader	Romania	18.43	18.83	x	18.83	q
7	Valdivino dos Santos	Brazil	18.45	18.01	18.30	18.45	
8	Pavlo Drach	Ukraine	16.89	17.05	18.23	18.23	
9	Maurits Damsteegt	Netherlands	x	x	17.90	17.90	
10	Demir Kolarević	Croatia	x	17.35	x	17.35	
11	Andrejs Samburs	Latvia	15.39	17.24	16.94	17.24	
12	Mario Alberto Lozano	Mexico	x	16.09	16.85	16.85	
	Sebastiano Bianchetti	Italy	x	x	x	NM	

===== Group B =====
24 July
Start time; 10:15 Temperature: 16 °C Humidity: 68 %
End time: 10:53 Temperature: 16 °C Humidity: 68 %

Rank	Name	Nationality	Attempts			Result	Notes
Rank	Name	Nationality	1	2	3	Result	Notes
1	Mostafa Amr Ahmed Ahmed Hassan	Egypt	19.84			19.84	Q
2	Patrick Müller	Germany	x	19.38		19.38	Q
3	Denzel Comenentia	Netherlands	18.39	19.33		19.33	Q
4	Martin Marković	Croatia	18.99	19.14	18.73	19.14	q
5	Osman Can Özdeveci	Turkey	18.24	x	19.12	19.12	q
6	Amir Ali Patterson	United States	18.88	18.52	x	18.88	q
7	Jan Parol	Poland	18.38	x	18.62	18.62	
8	Willy Vicaut	France	18.48	18.22	x	18.48	
9	Nicolai Ceban	Moldova	18.10	x	18.15	18.15	
10	Alin Alexandru Firfirica	Romania	x	17.51	17.55	17.55	
	Julius Malotkinas	Lithuania	x	x	x	NM	
	Blaž Zupančič	Slovenia	x	x	x	NM	
	Gian Piero Ragonesi	Italy	x	x	x	NM	

== Participation ==
According to an unofficial count, 26 athletes from 17 countries participated in the event.

- Brazil (1)
- Croatia (2)
- Egypt (2)
- France (1)
- Germany (2)
- Italy (2)
- Latvia (1)
- Lithuania (1)
- Mexico (1)
- Moldova (1)
- Netherlands (2)
- Poland (2)
- Romania (2)
- Slovenia (2)
- Turkey (1)
- Ukraine (1)
- United States (2)
