= 2017 European Throwing Cup =

- Dates: 11–12 March
- Host city: Las Palmas, Spain
- Events: 16
- Participation: 249 athletes

The 2017 European Throwing Cup was held on 11 and 13 March at the Gran Canaria Sport Complex "Martín Freire" in Las Palmas, Spain. It was the seventeenth edition of the athletics competition for throwing events and was jointly organised by the European Athletic Association. The competition featured men's and women's contests in shot put, discus throw, javelin throw and hammer throw. In addition to the senior competitions, there were also under-23 events for younger athletes.

== Medal summary ==
=== Senior ===
Men
Event	Gold		Silver		Bronze	
Shot put	Mesud Pezer (BIH)	20.69 m	Carlos Tobalina (ESP)	20.57 m	Francisco Belo (POR)	20.52 m
Discus throw	Lukas Weisshaidinger (AUT)	65.73 m	Andrius Gudžius (LTU)	64.18 m	Martin Kupper (EST)	62.86 m
Hammer throw	Quentin Bigot (FRA)	76.55 m	Pavel Bareisha (BLR)	74.41 m	Simone Falloni (ITA)	74.37 m
Javelin throw	Julian Weber (GER)	85.85 m	Roberto Bertolini (ITA)	78.78 m	Paraskevás Batzávalis (GRE)	78.40 m

Women
Event	Gold		Silver		Bronze	
Shot put	Anita Márton (HUN)	18.05 m	Jessica Cérival (FRA)	17.50 m	Yuliya Leantsiuk (BLR)	17.48 m
Discus throw	Mélina Robert-Michon (FRA)	62.35 m	Dragana Tomašević (SRB)	59.60 m	Hrisoula Anagnostopoulou (GRE)	59.47 m
Hammer throw	Alexandra Tavernier (FRA)	71.71 m	Kathrin Klaas (GER)	71.06 m	Ida Storm (SWE)	70.97 m
Javelin throw	Martina Ratej (SLO)	60.66 m	Ásdís Hjálmsdóttir (ISL)	59.20 m	Christin Hussong (GER)	59.00 m

=== Under-23 ===
Under-23 men
Event	Gold		Silver		Bronze	
Shot put	Osman Can Özdeveci (TUR)	19.61 m	Patrick Müller (GER)	18.62 m	Marcus Thomsen (NOR)	18.20 m
Discus throw	Alin Firfirică (ROU)	59.62 m	Guðni Valur Guðnason (ISL)	59.33 m	Domantas Poška (LTU)	58.87 m
Hammer throw	Alexej Mikhailov (GER)	71.56 m	Bence Halász (HUN)	71.51 m	Volodymyr Myslyvchuk (UKR)	69.47 m
Javelin throw	Adrian Mardari (MDA)	82.34 m	Norbert Rivasz-Tóth (HUN)	79.04 m	Jonas Bonewit (GER)	78.13 m

Under 23 women
Event	Gold		Silver		Bronze	
Shot put	Fanny Roos (SWE)	17.53 m	Alena Pasechnik (BLR)	16.33 m	Adele Nicoll (GBR)	16.21 m
Discus throw	Claudine Vita (GER)	58.76 m	Veronika Domjan (SLO)	55.73 m	Alexandra Emilianov (MDA)	54.66 m
Hammer throw	Marinda Petersson (SWE)	67.95 m	Réka Gyurátz (HUN)	67.70 m	Alyona Shamotina (UKR)	66.31 m
Javelin throw	Sara Kolak (CRO)	61.01 m	Eda Tuğsuz (TUR)	60.98 m	Sigrid Borge (NOR)	56.65 m

== Team standings ==
+ Seniors
Place	State	Points
1.	Italy	4329
2.	Ukraine	4245
3.	Spain	4182
4.	Portugal	4118
5.	Belarus	4079

+ Seniors
Place	State	Points
1.	France	4239
2.	Germany	4219
3.	Ukraine	4090
4.	Italy	3843

+ Youth U23 men
Place	State	Points
1.	Germany	4184
2.	Turkey	3988
3.	Ukraine	3937
4.	Romania	3876
5.	Italy	3743

+ Youth U23 women
Place	State	Points
1.	Germany	3881
2.	Italy	3803
3.	Estonia	3634
4	Turkey	3630
5	Ukraine	3549
