= Patrick Müller =

Patrick Müller may refer to:

- Patrick Müller (footballer) (born 1976), Swiss footballer
- Patrick Müller (cyclist) (born 1996), Swiss cyclist
- Patrick Müller (shot putter) (born 1996), German shot putter
