= 2015 European Athletics U23 Championships – Men's discus throw =

The men's discus throw event at the 2015 European Athletics U23 Championships was held in Tallinn, Estonia, at Kadriorg Stadium on 9 and 10 July.

== Medalists ==
| Gold | Alin Firfirică; Romania |
| Silver | Wojciech Praczyk; Poland |
| Bronze | Róbert Szikszai; Hungary |

== Results ==
=== Final ===
10 July

| Rank | Name | Nationality | Attempts | | | | | | Result | Notes |
| Rank | Name | Nationality | 1 | 2 | 3 | 4 | 5 | 6 | Result | Notes |
|---|---|---|---|---|---|---|---|---|---|---|
| 1st place, gold medalist(s) | Alin Firfirică | Romania | 59.21 | 60.64 | x | 57.77 | 57.37 | 59.43 | 60.64 | |
| 2nd place, silver medalist(s) | Wojciech Praczyk | Poland | 58.29 | 58.96 | 58.62 | 58.12 | 58.87 | 58.30 | 58.96 | |
| 3rd place, bronze medalist(s) | Róbert Szikszai | Hungary | x | 54.77 | 56.55 | x | 56.98 | 58.82 | 58.82 | |
| 4 | Filip Mihaljević | Croatia | 57.14 | 57.16 | 58.76 | 58.28 | x | 56.72 | 58.76 | |
| 5 | Simon Pettersson | Sweden | 55.86 | 58.05 | x | x | x | x | 58.05 | |
| 6 | Paweł Pasiński | Poland | x | 55.31 | 55.98 | 57.08 | x | x | 57.08 | |
| 7 | Damian Kamiński | Poland | 57.07 | x | x | x | 55.67 | x | 57.07 | |
| 8 | János Káplár | Hungary | x | 56.21 | x | x | x | x | 56.21 | |
| 9 | Sebastian Scheffel | Germany | 52.44 | x | 55.51 | | | | 55.51 | |
| 10 | Valery Halubkovich | Belarus | 55.49 | x | 55.38 | | | | 55.49 | |
| 11 | Sven Martin Skagestad | Norway | x | x | 52.68 | | | | 52.68 | |
| | Ola Stunes Isene | Norway | x | x | x | | | | NM | |

=== Qualifications ===
9 July

| Rank | Name | Nationality | Attempts | | | Result | Notes |
| Rank | Name | Nationality | 1 | 2 | 3 | Result | Notes |
|---|---|---|---|---|---|---|---|
| 1 | Ola Stunes Isene | Norway | 57.46 | 59.16 | 53.17 | 59.16 | q |
| 2 | Filip Mihaljević | Croatia | 58.49 | 57.12 | x | 58.49 | q |
| 3 | Róbert Szikszai | Hungary | x | x | 58.34 | 58.34 | q |
| 4 | Wojciech Praczyk | Poland | 57.88 | 58.14 | 56.15 | 58.14 | q |
| 5 | Sven Martin Skagestad | Norway | 57.25 | 56.57 | 57.65 | 57.65 | q |
| 6 | Alin Firfirică | Romania | 54.62 | 57.63 | x | 57.63 | q |
| 7 | Sebastian Scheffel | Germany | x | 56.18 | 56.97 | 56.97 | q |
| 8 | Damian Kamiński | Poland | 54.63 | 55.70 | 54.48 | 55.70 | q |
| 9 | Simon Pettersson | Sweden | 55.39 | 55.69 | x | 55.69 | q |
| 10 | Paweł Pasiński | Poland | 51.94 | 52.98 | 55.29 | 55.29 | q |
| 11 | Valery Halubkovich | Belarus | 52.95 | 47.81 | 55.27 | 55.27 | q |
| 12 | János Káplár | Hungary | 54.04 | 54.91 | x | 54.91 | q |
| 13 | Viktor Gardenkrans | Sweden | 52.57 | 52.38 | 54.33 | 54.33 | |
| 14 | Stefano Petrei | Italy | 51.28 | 52.31 | 53.93 | 53.93 | |
| 15 | Guðni Valur Guðnason | Iceland | 53.66 | 52.95 | x | 53.66 | |
| 16 | Andreas Christou | Cyprus | 53.56 | x | 53.45 | 53.56 | PB |
| 17 | Nicolai Ceban | Moldova | 53.31 | 50.86 | x | 53.31 | |
| 18 | Gian Piero Ragonesi | Italy | x | 52.63 | 52.32 | 52.63 | |
| 19 | Martin Pilato | Italy | 47.80 | 51.82 | x | 51.82 | |
| 20 | Raphail Antoniou | Cyprus | 51.43 | 48.66 | 49.43 | 51.43 | |
| 21 | Andreas Høyby Ellegaard | Denmark | 49.35 | 48.93 | 49.95 | 49.95 | |
| 22 | Sami Aartolahti | Finland | 49.91 | 48.53 | 48.34 | 49.91 | |
| | John-Caspar Jaanus | Estonia | x | x | x | NM | |

== Participation ==
According to an unofficial count, 23 athletes from 15 countries participated in the event.

- Belarus (1)
- Croatia (1)
- Cyprus (2)
- Denmark (1)
- Estonia (1)
- Finland (1)
- Germany (1)
- Hungary (2)
- Iceland (1)
- Italy (3)
- Moldova (1)
- Norway (2)
- Poland (3)
- Romania (1)
- Sweden (2)
