= 2014 World Junior Championships in Athletics – Men's discus throw =

The men's discus throw event at the 2014 World Junior Championships in Athletics was held in Eugene, Oregon, USA, at Hayward Field on 25 and 26 July. A 1.75 kg (junior implement) discus was used.

== Medalists ==
Gold	Martin Marković; Croatia
Silver	Henning Prüfer; Germany
Bronze	Sven Martin Skagestad; Norway

== Results ==
=== Final ===
26 July
Start time: 16:05 Temperature: 30 °C Humidity: 31 %
End time: 17:02 Temperature: 31 °C Humidity: 27 %

Rank	Name	Nationality	Attempts						Result	Notes
Rank	Name	Nationality	1	2	3	4	5	6	Result	Notes
1st place, gold medalist(s)	Martin Marković	Croatia	64.70	x	66.94	x	x	x	66.94	WJL
2nd place, silver medalist(s)	Henning Prüfer	Germany	62.20	63.70	x	62.47	64.18	x	64.18	PB
3rd place, bronze medalist(s)	Sven Martin Skagestad	Norway	55.46	60.67	63.21	x	61.41	59.90	63.21	
4	Matthew Denny	Australia	61.65	x	58.98	58.47	62.73	60.10	62.73	
5	Ola Stunes Isene	Norway	61.83	58.16	x	59.93	x	x	61.83	
6	Mitchell Cooper	Australia	61.29	x	60.54	x	x	61.77	61.77	PB
7	Gian Piero Ragonesi	Italy	60.47	57.78	59.66	58.43	x	x	60.47	PB
8	Ryan Njegovan	United States	56.30	59.56	x	56.78	x	x	59.56	
9	Kord Ferguson	United States	57.75	x	59.54				59.54	
10	Valeri Golubkovich	Belarus	59.30	59.08	57.77				59.30	
11	Nicolai Ceban	Moldova	54.65	58.65	57.86				58.65	NJR
12	Maximilian Klaus	Germany	55.10	x	54.30				55.10	

=== Qualifications ===
25 July
With qualifying standard of 59.00 (Q) or at least the 12 best performers (q) advance to the Final

==== Summary ====
Rank	Name	Nationality	Result	Notes
1	Martin Marković	Croatia	63.71	Q
2	Matthew Denny	Australia	62.38	Q
3	Valeri Golubkovich	Belarus	62.35	Q NJR
4	Gian Piero Ragonesi	Italy	60.30	Q PB
5	Sven Martin Skagestad	Norway	59.97	Q
6	Henning Prüfer	Germany	59.93	Q
7	Ryan Njegovan	United States	59.89	Q PB
8	Mitchell Cooper	Australia	59.31	Q PB
9	Kord Ferguson	United States	59.20	Q
10	Nicolai Ceban	Moldova	59.17	Q NJR
11	Ola Stunes Isene	Norway	59.16	Q
12	Maximilian Klaus	Germany	58.61	q
13	Alin Alexandru Firfirica	Romania	58.23	
14	Irfan Shamsuddin	Malaysia	57.74	
15	Yusuf Yalçinkaya	Turkey	57.12	NJR
16	Glenford Watson	Jamaica	56.30	PB
17	Bartłomiej Stój	Poland	55.92	
18	Domantas Poška	Lithuania	55.77	
19	Giulio Anesa	Italy	55.57	
20	Aleksey Khudyakov	Russia	55.17	
21	Kiriákos Zótos	Greece	53.88	
22	Demir Kolarević	Croatia	53.85	
23	Gustav Liberg	Sweden	53.12	
24	Sachin Dalal Singh	India	52.93	
25	Konrad Bukowiecki	Poland	52.92	
26	Viktor Gardenkrans	Sweden	52.72	
27	Maurits Damsteegt	Netherlands	46.90	
	Suren Khachatryan	Armenia	NM	
	Mustafa Kazem Dagher	Iraq	DNS	

==== Details ====
With qualifying standard of 59.00 (Q) or at least the 12 best performers (q) advance to the Final

===== Group A =====
26 July
Start time; 09:58 Temperature: 14 °C Humidity: 82 %
End time: 10:33 Temperature: 18 °C Humidity: 64 %

Rank	Name	Nationality	Attempts			Result	Notes
Rank	Name	Nationality	1	2	3	Result	Notes
1	Martin Marković	Croatia	63.71			63.71	Q
2	Ryan Njegovan	United States	57.54	57.92	59.89	59.89	Q PB
3	Mitchell Cooper	Australia	53.38	55.14	59.31	59.31	Q PB
4	Nicolai Ceban	Moldova	x	58.57	59.17	59.17	Q NJR
5	Ola Stunes Isene	Norway	59.16			59.16	Q
6	Maximilian Klaus	Germany	58.61	x	x	58.61	q
7	Glenford Watson	Jamaica	56.30	x	54.89	56.30	PB
8	Bartłomiej Stój	Poland	55.92	x	x	55.92	
9	Domantas Poška	Lithuania	55.77	x	x	55.77	
10	Giulio Anesa	Italy	x	54.17	55.57	55.57	
11	Aleksey Khudyakov	Russia	55.17	x	53.03	55.17	
12	Kiriákos Zótos	Greece	50.50	53.58	53.88	53.88	
13	Viktor Gardenkrans	Sweden	50.84	52.61	52.72	52.72	
14	Maurits Damsteegt	Netherlands	x	x	46.90	46.90	

===== Group B =====
26 July
Start time; 11:09 Temperature: 18 °C Humidity: 64 %
End time: 11:38 Temperature: 21 °C Humidity: 53 %

Rank	Name	Nationality	Attempts			Result	Notes
Rank	Name	Nationality	1	2	3	Result	Notes
1	Matthew Denny	Australia	62.38			62.38	Q
2	Valeri Golubkovich	Belarus	x	62.35		62.35	Q NJR
3	Gian Piero Ragonesi	Italy	60.30			60.30	Q PB
4	Sven Martin Skagestad	Norway	59.97			59.97	Q
5	Henning Prüfer	Germany	52.57	59.93		59.93	Q
6	Kord Ferguson	United States	59.20			59.20	Q
7	Alin Alexandru Firfirica	Romania	58.23	x	x	58.23	
8	Irfan Shamsuddin	Malaysia	57.74	x	53.23	57.74	
9	Yusuf Yalçinkaya	Turkey	57.12	x	56.88	57.12	NJR
10	Demir Kolarević	Croatia	53.85	x	51.46	53.85	
11	Gustav Liberg	Sweden	x	53.12	x	53.12	
12	Sachin Dalal Singh	India	x	x	52.93	52.93	
13	Konrad Bukowiecki	Poland	x	52.92	x	52.92	
	Suren Khachatryan	Armenia	x	x	x	NM	
	Mustafa Kazem Dagher	Iraq				DNS	

== Participation ==
According to an unofficial count, 28 athletes from 20 countries participated in the event.

- Armenia (1)
- Australia (2)
- Belarus (1)
- Croatia (2)
- Germany (2)
- Greece (1)
- India (1)
- Italy (2)
- Jamaica (1)
- Lithuania (1)
- Malaysia (1)
- Moldova (1)
- Netherlands (1)
- Norway (2)
- Poland (2)
- Romania (1)
- Russia (1)
- Sweden (2)
- Turkey (1)
- United States (2)
