= Athletics at the 2018 Commonwealth Games – Men's discus throw =

Men's discus throw at the 2018 Commonwealth Games
- Venue: Carrara Stadium
- Dates: 12 April (qualifying round); 13 April (final)
- Competitors: 15 from 11 nations
- Winning distance: 68.20 m GR

Medalists
| gold medal | Fedrick Dacres | Jamaica |
| silver medal | Traves Smikle | Jamaica |
| bronze medal | Apostolos Parellis | Cyprus |

The men's discus throw at the 2018 Commonwealth Games, as part of the athletics programme, took place in the Carrara Stadium in Queensland on 12 and 13 April 2018.

The winning margin was 4.22 metres which as of 2024 remains the greatest winning margin in the men's discus throw at these games, beating the previous record set at the 1958 Cardiff games by 1 cm.

== Records ==
Prior to this competition, the existing world and Games records were as follows:

| World record | Jürgen Schult (GDR) | 74.08 m | Neubrandenburg, East Germany | 6 June 1986 |
| Games record | Frantz Kruger (RSA) | 66.39 m | Manchester, England | 27 July 2002 |

== Schedule ==
The schedule was as follows:

| Date | Time | Round |
|---|---|---|
| Thursday 12 April 2018 | 10:00 | Qualification |
| Friday 13 April 2018 | 19:45 | Final |

All times are Australian Eastern Standard Time (UTC+10)

== Results ==
=== Qualifying round ===
Across two groups, those who threw ≥62.00 m (Q) or at least the 12 best performers (q) advanced to the final.

| Rank | Athlete | Group | #1 | #2 | #3 | Result | Notes | Qual. |
|---|---|---|---|---|---|---|---|---|
| 1 | A | Fedrick Dacres (JAM) | 66.20 | | | 66.20 | | Q |
| 2 | B | Traves Smikle (JAM) | 61.29 | 64.69 | | 64.69 | | Q |
| 3 | B | Matthew Denny (AUS) | 59.66 | 64.67 | | 64.67 | SB | Q |
| 4 | A | Benn Harradine (AUS) | 55.63 | 59.88 | 61.64 | 61.64 | | q |
| 5 | B | Apostolos Parellis (CYP) | 60.19 | 61.45 | x | 61.45 | | q |
| 6 | B | Stephen Mozia (NGR) | 56.27 | x | 59.95 | 59.95 | SB | q |
| 7 | B | Mitchell Cooper (AUS) | 46.75 | 56.24 | 59.68 | 59.68 | | q |
| 8 | A | Alex Rose (SAM) | 57.19 | x | 59.11 | 59.11 | | q |
| 9 | A | Zane Duquemin (JEY) | 45.72 | 57.66 | x | 57.66 | | q |
| 10 | B | Eldred Henry (IVB) | 50.43 | x | x | 50.43 | SB | q |
| 11 | A | De'bono Paraka (PNG) | 49.02 | x | 48.53 | 49.02 | | q |
| 12 | B | Mustafa Fall (FIJ) | x | x | 39.68 | 39.68 | | q |
| – | A | Andreas Christou (CYP) | x | x | x | NM | | |
| – | B | Muhammad Irfan Shamshuddin (MAS) | x | x | x | NM | | |
| – | A | Akeem Stewart (TTO) | | | | DNS | | |

=== Final ===
The medals were determined in the final.

| Rank | Name | #1 | #2 | #3 | #4 | #5 | #6 | Result | Notes |
|---|---|---|---|---|---|---|---|---|---|
| 1st place, gold medalist(s) | Fedrick Dacres (JAM) | 65.55 | 66.09 | 68.20 | 67.14 | 67.51 | 65.00 | 68.20 | GR |
| 2nd place, silver medalist(s) | Traves Smikle (JAM) | 63.21 | 63.01 | 63.83 | 63.98 | 62.87 | 63.45 | 63.98 | |
| 3rd place, bronze medalist(s) | Apostolos Parellis (CYP) | 63.61 | 62.87 | 62.53 | 61.54 | x | 61.26 | 63.61 | |
| 4 | Matthew Denny (AUS) | 62.14 | x | 62.53 | x | 60.25 | x | 62.53 | |
| 5 | Mitchell Cooper (AUS) | x | 59.39 | x | 59.10 | x | 60.40 | 60.40 | |
| 6 | Benn Harradine (AUS) | 59.35 | x | 59.99 | 59.03 | 59.92 | 58.38 | 59.92 | |
| 7 | Stephen Mozia (NGR) | x | 59.08 | x | 59.58 | x | x | 59.58 | |
| 8 | Alex Rose (SAM) | 58.97 | 59.45 | 59.56 | 58.85 | 58.66 | 57.23 | 59.56 | |
| 9 | Zane Duquemin (JEY) | 45.64 | 54.84 | 55.64 | — | | | 55.64 | |
| 10 | De'bono Paraka (PNG) | 50.35 | x | 52.60 | — | | | 52.60 | NR |
| 11 | Eldred Henry (IVB) | 50.96 | 49.98 | x | — | | | 50.96 | SB |
| 12 | Mustafa Fall (FIJ) | 43.50 | x | x | — | | | 43.50 | |
