= Mitchell Cooper =

Australian discus thrower

Personal information
- Born: 2 June 1995 (age 31) Kippa-Ring, Queensland, Australia, Australia
- Education: University of Kansas
- Height: 1.96 m (6 ft 5 in)
- Weight: 136 kg (300 lb)
- Spouse: Zoe Cooper (October 2019)

Sport
- Sport: Athletics
- Event: Discus throw
- College team: Kansas Jayhawks
- Coached by: Ken Harradine; Garth Cooper; Andriy Kokhanovsky

Mitchell Cooper (born 2 June 1995) is an Australian athlete specialising in the discus throw. He represented his country at the 2017 World Championships without qualifying for the final.

Cooper is from Burpengary, Queensland, Australia. He was an All-American thrower for the Kansas Jayhawks track and field team, finishing 6th in the discus at the 2017 NCAA Division I Outdoor Track and Field Championships.

His personal best in the event is 63.98 metres set in Lawrence in 2017.

== International competitions ==
Year	Competition	Venue	Position	Event	Notes
Representing Australia
2011	Commonwealth Youth Games	Douglas, Isle of Man	4th	Discus throw (1.5 kg)	60.54 m
2011	Commonwealth Youth Games	Douglas, Isle of Man	7th	Hammer throw (5 kg)	55.37 m
2012	World Junior Championships	Barcelona, Spain	14th (q)	Discus throw (1.75 kg)	56.25 m
2014	World Junior Championships	Eugene, United States	6th	Discus throw (1.75 kg)	61.77 m
2017	World Championships	London, United Kingdom	28th (q)	Discus throw	57.26 m
2018	Commonwealth Games	Gold Coast, Australia	5th	Discus throw	60.40 m
