= Athletics at the 2017 Summer Universiade – Men's discus throw =

The men's discus throw event at the 2017 Summer Universiade was held on 26 and 28 August at the Taipei Municipal Stadium.

== Medalists ==
Gold	Silver	Bronze
Reginald Jagers III; United States	Alin Alexandru Firfirică; Romania	Róbert Szikszai; Hungary

== Results ==
=== Qualification ===
Qualification: 60.00 m (Q) or at least 12 best (q) qualified for the final.

Rank	Group	Athlete	Nationality	#1	#2	#3	Result	Notes
1	B	Alin Alexandru Firfirică	Romania	56.82	59.69	61.98	61.98	Q, SB
2	A	Róbert Szikszai	Hungary	56.16	56.64	61.01	61.01	Q
3	A	Reginald Jagers III	United States	56.01	57.71	60.43	60.43	Q
4	B	János Huszák	Hungary	59.47	–	–	59.47	q
5	B	Mario Cota	Mexico	57.39	58.25	55.28	58.25	q
6	B	Gregory Thompson	Great Britain	57.12	56.30	57.94	57.94	q
7	B	Francisco Belo	Portugal	57.41	57.09	57.73	57.73	q
8	A	Muhammad Shamshuddin	Malaysia	53.34	57.42	56.43	57.42	q
9	A	Maximilian Klaus	Germany	56.20	55.37	56.11	56.20	q
10	B	Domantas Poška	Lithuania	55.42	51.90	56.70	56.70	q
11	A	Douglas dos Reis	Brazil	50.10	x	55.94	55.94	q
12	A	Martin Marković	Croatia	55.40	x	x	55.40	q, SB
13	A	Andreas Ellegaard	Denmark	53.25	x	53.63	53.63	
14	B	Torben Brandt	Germany	50.78	x	50.24	50.78	
15	A	Kim Dong-hyuk	South Korea	x	49.11	48.90	49.11	
16	B	Jason van Rooyen	South Africa	45.07	47.15	x	47.15	
17	A	Eduardo Espín	Ecuador	43.72	44.62	43.56	44.62	
18	B	Carlo Caong	Philippines	x	38.73	x	38.73	
	A	Faridun Ashurov	Tajikistan	x	x	x	NM	
	A	Itamar Levi	Israel	x	x	x	NM	
	B	Bartłomiej Stój	Poland	x	x	x	NM	

=== Final ===
Rank	Name	Nationality	#1	#2	#3	#4	#5	#6	Result	Notes
1st place, gold medalist(s)	Reginald Jagers III	United States	60.00	x	59.39	59.10	61.24	x	61.24	
2nd place, silver medalist(s)	Alin Alexandru Firfirică	Romania	x	61.13	60.15	60.35	60.75	60.56	61.13	
3rd place, bronze medalist(s)	Róbert Szikszai	Hungary	52.88	57.52	60.91	x	x	58.47	60.91	
4	Mario Cota	Mexico	56.98	60.07	x	59.21	x	57.61	60.07	
5	Francisco Belo	Portugal	59.56	59.78	57.19	x	57.76	55.39	59.78	
6	János Huszák	Hungary	57.80	59.69	x	59.08	x	x	59.69	
7	Douglas dos Reis	Brazil	x	59.37	x	x	x	56.34	59.37	
8	Gregory Thompson	Great Britain	56.57	x	57.52	x	x	x	57.52	
9	Domantas Poška	Lithuania	57.38	x	x				57.38	
10	Martin Marković	Croatia	x	53.86	56.49				56.49	SB
11	Maximilian Klaus	Germany	56.42	56.44	55.03				56.44	
12	Muhammad Shamshuddin	Malaysia	x	53.25	53.48				53.48	
