= Sven Martin Skagestad =

Norwegian discus thrower (born 1995)

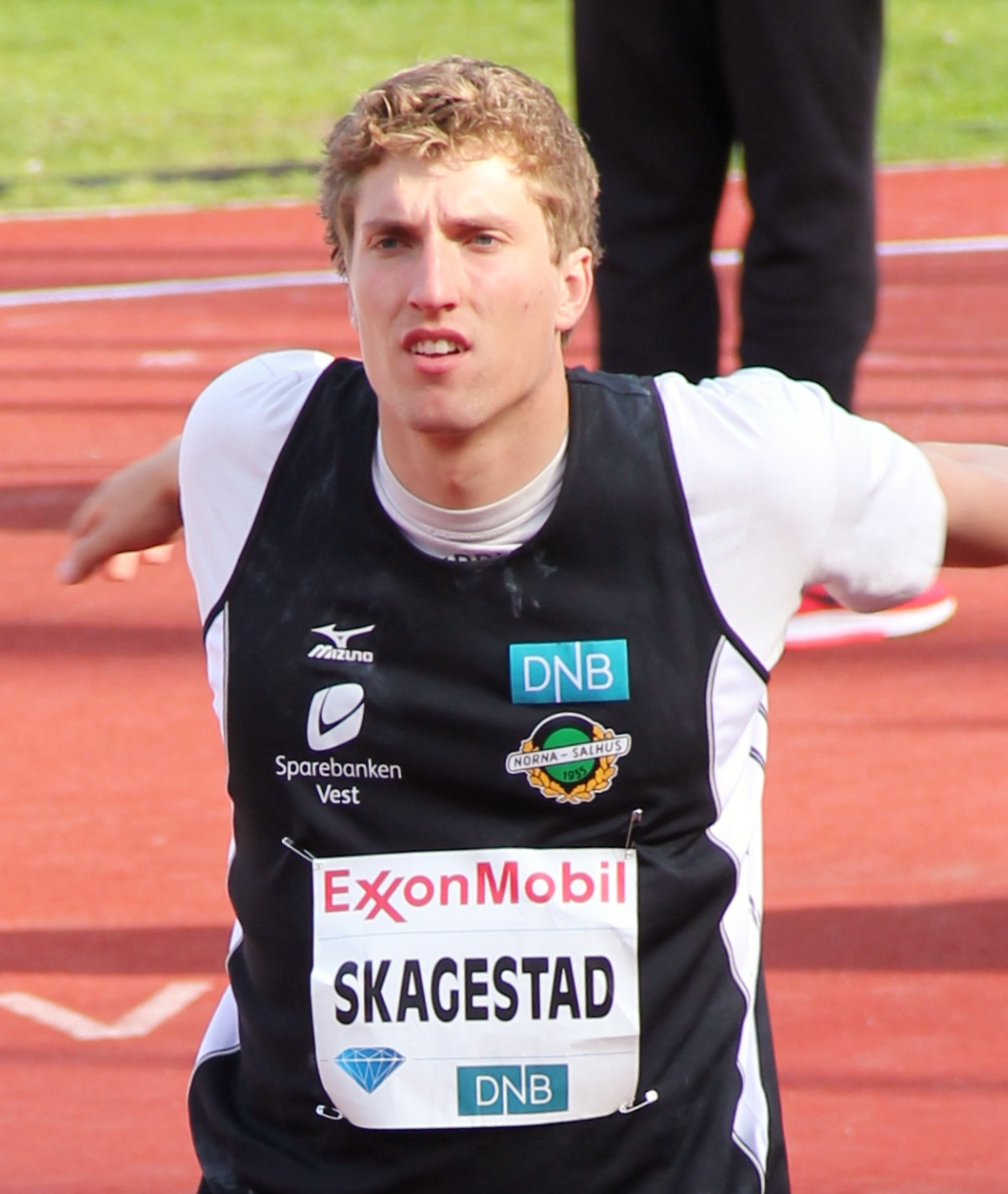
- Sven Martin Skagestad in 2015

Personal information
- Born: 13 January 1995 (age 31)
- Height: 2.01 m (6 ft 7 in)

Sport
- Sport: Athletics
- Event: Discus throw
- Club: IL Norna-Salhus
- Coached by: Einar Kristian Tveitå

Sven Martin Skagestad (born 13 January 1995) is a Norwegian athlete specialising in the discus throw. He won the bronze medal at the 2014 World Junior Championships.

His personal best in the event is 65.20 metres set in Wiesbaden in 2016.

== International competitions ==
Year	Competition	Venue	Position	Event	Notes
Representing Norway
2011	European Youth Olympic Festival	Trabzon, Turkey	8th	Discus throw (1.5 kg)	69.26 m
2013	European Junior Championships	Rieti, Italy	28th (q)	Discus throw (1.75 kg)	46.53 m
2014	World Junior Championships	Eugene, United States	3rd	Discus throw (1.75 kg)	63.21 m
2015	European U23 Championships	Tallinn, Estonia	11th	Discus throw	52.68 m
2016	European Championships	Amsterdam, Netherlands	16th (q)	Discus throw	62.04 m
2016	Olympic Games	Rio de Janeiro, Brazil	13th (q)	Discus throw	62.45 m
2017	European U23 Championships	Bydgoszcz, Poland	1st	Discus throw	61.00 m
2017	World Championships	London, United Kingdom	26th (q)	Discus throw	58.86 m
2022	European Championships	Munich, Germany	–	Discus throw	NM
