= 2017 European Athletics U23 Championships – Men's discus throw =

The men's discus throw event at the 2017 European Athletics U23 Championships was held in Bydgoszcz, Poland, at Zdzisław Krzyszkowiak Stadium on 15 and 16 July.

== Medalists ==
Gold	Sven Martin Skagestad; Norway
Silver	Alin Alexandru Firfirică; Romania
Bronze	Clemens Prüfer; Germany

== Results ==
=== Qualification ===
15 July

Qualification rule: 57.50 (Q) or the 12 best results (q) qualified for the final.

Rank	Group	Name	Nationality	#1	#2	#3	Results	Notes
1	B	Sven Martin Skagestad	Norway	60.93			60.93	Q
2	A	Bartłomiej Stój	Poland	x	59.57		59.57	Q
3	B	Alin Alexandru Firfirică	Romania	56.88	56.12	59.41	59.41	Q
4	B	Clemens Prüfer	Germany	54.07	x	57.56	57.56	Q
5	B	Domantas Poška	Lithuania	56.30	x	57.27	57.27	q
6	A	Guðni Valur Guðnason	Iceland	54.29	x	56.57	56.57	q
7	B	Viktar Trus	Belarus	55.95	56.45	x	56.45	q
8	B	Viktor Gardenkrans	Sweden	52.38	56.29	55.68	56.29	q
9	A	Gian Piero Ragonesi	Italy	56.11	x	x	56.11	q
10	A	Ola Stunes Isene	Norway	55.24	55.42	x	55.42	q
11	A	Maximilian Klaus	Germany	51.57	50.43	55.04	55.04	q
12	B	Krystian Pawelczyk	Poland	45.57	54.50	x	54.50	q
13	A	Jakob Gardenkrans	Sweden	52.22	54.42	53.24	54.42	
14	A	Torben Brandt	Germany	x	54.27	x	54.27	
15	B	Martin Marković	Croatia	x	53.91	x	53.91	
16	A	Kiriakos Zotos	Greece	53.57	52.60	x	53.57	
17	A	Edujose Lima	Portugal	x	52.40	53.39	53.39	
18	B	Gustav Liberg	Sweden	52.61	52.50	49.53	52.61	
19	B	Oskari Perälampi	Finland	52.05	x	x	52.05	
20	B	Stefan Mura	Moldova	x	x	51.96	51.96	
21	A	Marko Perić	Serbia	49.00	46.78	51.68	51.68	
22	A	Simonas Martišius	Lithuania	48.69	x	51.42	51.42	
23	A	Ivan Povalyashko	Ukraine	49.87	49.54	50.08	50.08	
24	B	Yusuf Yalçınkaya	Turkey	x	49.61	49.93	49.93	
25	A	Raphail Antoniou	Cyprus	x	x	49.08	49.08	
	B	Lukas Laima	Lithuania	x	x	x	NM	

=== Final ===
16 July

Rank	Name	Nationality	#1	#2	#3	#4	#5	#6	Result	Notes
1st place, gold medalist(s)	Sven Martin Skagestad	Norway	57.69	59.28	x	57.88	61.00	x	61.00	
2nd place, silver medalist(s)	Alin Alexandru Firfirică	Romania	60.17	x	58.95	58.70	x	x	60.17	
3rd place, bronze medalist(s)	Clemens Prüfer	Germany	58.21	x	60.08	x	x	58.63	60.08	
4	Viktar Trus	Belarus	58.47	x	57.75	55.38	55.10	55.78	58.47	
5	Guðni Valur Guðnason	Iceland	54.02	57.31	x	56.51	x	x	57.31	
6	Maximilian Klaus	Germany	53.80	56.39	57.18	56.67	54.78	56.96	57.18	
7	Gian Piero Ragonesi	Italy	51.00	56.76	x	56.86	x	x	56.86	
8	Krystian Pawelczyk	Poland	x	x	56.75	x	x	x	56.75	
9	Domantas Poška	Lithuania	56.14	x	56.32				56.32	
10	Viktor Gardenkrans	Sweden	52.33	55.17	x				55.17	
11	Ola Stunes Isene	Norway	54.95	x	53.44				54.95	
	Bartłomiej Stój	Poland	x	x	x				NM	
