= 2012 World Junior Championships in Athletics – Men's discus throw =

The men's discus throw at the 2012 World Junior Championships in Athletics was held at the Estadi Olímpic Lluís Companys on 10 and 12 July.

== Medalists ==
Gold	Fedrick Dacres; Jamaica
Silver	Wojciech Praczyk; Poland
Bronze	Gerhard de Beer; South Africa

== Records ==
Prior to the competition, the existing world junior and championship records were as follows.

World Junior Record	Mykyta Nesterenko (UKR)	70.13 m	Halle, Germany	24 May 2008
Championship Record	Margus Hunt (EST)	67.32 m	Beijing, China	16 August 2006
World Junior Leading	Wojciech Praczyk (POL)	64.22 m	Białystok, Poland	24 June 2012

== Results ==
=== Qualification ===
Qualification: Standard 59.40 m (Q) or at least best 12 qualified (q)

Rank	Group	Name	Nationality	#1	#2	#3	Result	Note
1	A	Wojciech Praczyk	Poland	59.32	60.72		60.72	Q
2	A	Mauricio Ortega	Colombia	59.84			59.84	Q, NU20R
3	B	Jordan Young	Canada	51.53	59.54		59.54	Q
4	B	Gerhard de Beer	South Africa	X	56.74	59.01	59.01	q
5	B	Viktor Butenko	Russia	58.98	58.55	X	58.98	q
6	A	Fedrick Dacres	Jamaica	13.31	57.48	58.90	58.90	q
7	A	Behnam Shiri	Iran	58.23	X	57.56	58.23	q
8	B	Dalton Rowan	United States	56.48	55.48	57.65	57.65	q, PB
9	A	Arjun Arjun	India	47.51	56.00	57.60	57.60	q, PB
10	B	Nicholas Percy	Great Britain	56.89	51.67	53.32	56.89	q
11	A	Sebastian Scheffel	Germany	X	53.84	56.85	56.85	q
12	A	Felipe Lorenzon	Brazil	X	56.78	X	56.78	q
13	A	Róbert Szikszai	Hungary	55.68	52.65	56.51	56.51	
14	B	Mitchell Cooper	Australia	56.25	53.61	52.91	56.25	
15	A	Jan-Louw Kotze	South Africa	53.60	55.59	54.31	55.59	
16	A	Giacomo Grotti	Italy	51.88	54.59	55.25	55.25	
17	B	Jaromír Mazgal	Czech Republic	54.72	52.46	53.49	54.72	
18	A	Rodney Brown	United States	54.66	X	53.03	54.66	
19	B	Damian Kamiński	Poland	53.87	54.50	54.31	54.50	
20	B	Philipp van Dijck	Germany	X	53.49	54.42	54.42	
21	A	Jaka Žulic	Slovenia	52.71	X	X	52.71	
22	A	Søren Børsting	Denmark	51.71	51.37	X	51.71	
23	A	Nikola Cankovic	Serbia	X	X	49.39	49.39	
24	B	Juan Ignacio Solito	Argentina	53.41	53.10	49.60	53.41	
25	B	Viktor Gardenkrans	Sweden	53.24	51.74	X	53.24	
26	B	Stefano Petrei	Italy	50.64	X	52.48	52.48	
27	B	Andreas Ellegaard	Denmark	X	51.98	50.61	51.98	
–	B	Murat Gündüz	Turkey	X	X		NM	

=== Final ===
Rank	Name	Nationality	#1	#2	#3	#4	#5	#6	Result	Note
1st place, gold medalist(s)	Fedrick Dacres	Jamaica	60.46	62.80	X	61.20	X	61.29	62.80	PB
2nd place, silver medalist(s)	Wojciech Praczyk	Poland	62.66	X	X	X	59.61	62.75	62.75	
3rd place, bronze medalist(s)	Gerhard de Beer	South Africa	56.56	60.13	61.25	61.57	X	X	61.57	
4	Viktor Butenko	Russia	58.96	59.96	X	59.12	59.04	61.48	61.48	
5	Felipe Lorenzon	Brazil	X	X	61.18	57.39	X	X	61.18	PB
6	Jordan Young	Canada	57.45	X	57.68	60.44	59.89	X	60.44	
7	Dalton Rowan	United States	58.75	57.55	X	X	X	59.31	59.31	PB
8	Nicholas Percy	Great Britain	56.47	54.83	57.79	X	X	56.98	57.79	
9	Mauricio Ortega	Colombia	51.29	57.41	57.50				57.50	
10	Sebastian Scheffel	Germany	X	56.71	56.77				56.77	
11	Arjun Arjun	India	54.56	X	52.75				54.56	
	Behnam Shiri Jabilou	Iran	X	X	X				NM	

== Participation ==
According to an unofficial count, 28 athletes from 22 countries participated in the event.

- Argentina (1)
- Australia (1)
- Brazil (1)
- Canada (1)
- Colombia (1)
- Czech Republic (1)
- Denmark (2)
- Germany (2)
- Hungary (1)
- India (1)
- Iran (1)
- Italy (2)
- Jamaica (1)
- Poland (2)
- Russia (1)
- Serbia (1)
- Slovenia (1)
- South Africa (2)
- Sweden (1)
- Turkey (1)
- United Kingdom (1)
- United States (2)
