= Bartłomiej Stój =

Polish discus thrower (born 1996)

Personal information
- Full name: Bartłomiej Paweł Stój
- Born: 15 May 1996 (age 30) Przędzel, Poland
- Education: Opole University of Technology
- Height: 1.92 m (6 ft 4 in)

Sport
- Sport: Athletics
- Event: Discus throw
- Club: KKS Victoria Stalowa Wola (2011–2016); AZS KU Politechniki Opolskiej (2017–)
- Coached by: Stanisław Anioł; Jacek Łyp; Witold Suski

Bartłomiej Paweł Stój (pronounced [bartˈwɔmiɛj ˈstuj]; born 15 May 1996) is a Polish athlete specialising in the discus throw. He won a gold medal at the 2015 European Junior Championships in Eskilstuna.

His personal best in the event is 64.64 metres set in Bydgoszcz in 2016.

== International competitions ==
Year	Competition	Venue	Position	Event	Notes
Representing Poland
2013	World Youth Championships	Donetsk, Ukraine	5th	Discus throw (1.5 kg)	60.74 m
2014	World Junior Championships	Eugene, United States	17th (q)	Discus throw (1.75 kg)	55.92 m
2015	European Junior Championships	Eskilstuna, Sweden	1st	Discus throw (1.75 kg)	68.02 m
2016	European Championships	Amsterdam, Netherlands	21st (q)	Discus throw	61.30 m
2017	European U23 Championships	Bydgoszcz, Poland	2nd (q)	Discus throw	59.57 m^{1}
2017	Universiade	Taipei, Taiwan	–	Discus throw	NM
2019	Universiade	Naples, Italy	6th	Discus throw	61.09 m
2019	World Championships	Doha, Qatar	22nd (q)	Discus throw	61.79 m
2021	Olympic Games	Tokyo, Japan	14th (q)	Discus throw	62.84 m

^{1}No mark in the final
