= Nicholas Percy =

Scottish discus thrower

Nicholas Percy OLY
Personal information
- Born: 5 December 1994 (age 31) Glasgow, Scotland
- Education: University of Nebraska–Lincoln
- Height: 1.89 m (6 ft 2 in)
- Weight: 125 kg (276 lb)

Sport
- Sport: Athletics
- Event: Discus throw
- College team: Nebraska Cornhuskers
- Club: Shaftesbury Barnet Harriers
- Coached by: Raymond Scovell (–2010); John Hillier (2012–2013); William Bushnell (2011–2011); Vésteinn Hafsteinsson (2014–2020); Zane Duquemin (2020–)
Medal record
Representing United Kingdom
European Junior Championships
Silver medal – second place	2013 Rieti	Discus throw
Representing Scotland
Commonwealth Youth Games
Silver medal – second place	2011 Douglas	Discus throw
Bronze medal – third place	2011 Douglas	Hammer throw
British Championships
Gold medal – first place	2016 Birmingham	Discus throw
Gold medal – first place	2017 Birmingham	Discus throw
Gold medal – first place	2019 Birmingham	Discus throw
Gold medal – first place	2020 Manchester	Discus throw
Gold medal – first place	2022 Manchester	Discus throw
Silver medal – second place	2021 Manchester	Discus throw
Silver medal – second place	2023 Manchester	Discus throw
Silver medal – second place	2024 Manchester	Discus throw
Silver medal – second place	2025 Birmingham	Discus throw
Silver medal – second place	2026 Birmingham	Discus throw
Bronze medal – third place	2018 Birmingham	Discus throw
Representing Isle of Wight
Island Games
Gold medal – first place	2023 Guernsey	Discus throw
Representing Nebraska Cornhuskers
NCAA Division I Championships
Gold medal – first place	2016 Eugene	Discus throw

Nicholas Percy (born 5 December 1994) is a Scottish athlete specialising in the discus throw. He has competed at multiple major Championships, including the 2024 Olympic Games.

== Biography ==
Born in Glasgow, he later became based on the Isle of Wight. He won a silver medal at the 2013 European Junior Championships in Rieti, Italy, with a discus throw of 62.04 metres. He won the NCAA Championships in 2016. That year, he won his first British Athletics Championships title. He retained his title the following year and subsequently, Percy represented Great Britain at the 2017 World Championships without reaching the final.

He became British champion for the fifth time when winning the discus throw event at the 2022 British Athletics Championships with a throw of 65.00. He finished fifth representing Scotland in the discus throw at the 2022 Commonwealth Games in Birmingham. In 2022, he also represented Great Britain at the 2022 World Athletics Championships and the 2022 European Athletics Championships. However, a back injury waylaid his forward progress and in 2023 he managed a season's best throw of 64.73 metres, and he missed the World Championships that year.

He threw a personal best in the event of 67.73 metres, set at the Oklahoma Throws Series, Ramona, Oklahoma, USA, on 6 April 2024. This Improved his PB by more than two metres and his ranking from No.10 to No.2 on the UK all-time list, with only UK record-holder Lawrence Okoye having thrown further. Percy also improved his own Scottish record of 65.00m, which he had previously set at the UK Championships in 2022.

After winning the discus silver medal at the 2024 British Athletics Championships, Percy was subsequently named in the Great Britain team for the 2024 Summer Olympics where he failed to qualify for the final.

On 17 April 2025 Percy threw 67:86 at the Oklahoma Throw Series #13; improving his PB by 13 centimetres and breaking his own Scottish national record.

== International competitions ==
Year	Competition	Venue	Position	Event	Notes
Representing Great Britain and Scotland
2011	World Youth Championships	Lille, France	7th	Discus throw (1.5 kg)	58.95 m
2011	Commonwealth Youth Games	Douglas, Isle of Man	2nd	Discus throw (1.5 kg)	62.96 m
2011	Commonwealth Youth Games	Douglas, Isle of Man	3rd	Hammer throw (5 kg)	64.96 m
2012	World Junior Championships	Barcelona, Spain	8th	Discus throw (1.75 kg)	57.79 m
2013	European Junior Championships	Rieti, Italy	2nd	Discus throw (1.75 kg)	62.04 m
2014	Commonwealth Games	Glasgow, United Kingdom	13th (q)	Discus throw	56.71 m
2017	World Championships	London, United Kingdom	29th (q)	Discus throw	56.93 m
2019	Universiade	Naples, Italy	7th	Discus throw	60.92 m
2022	World Championships	Eugene, United States	14th (q)	Discus throw	63.20 m
2022	European Championships	Munich, Germany	14th (q)	Discus throw	61.26 m
2022	Commonwealth Games	Birmingham, United Kingdom	5th	Discus throw	63.53 m
2024	Olympic Games	Paris, France	20th (q)	Discus throw	61.81 m
2026	Commonwealth Games	Glasgow, United Kingdom	7th	Discus throw	58.28 m
