= Andrei Toader =

Romanian shot putter

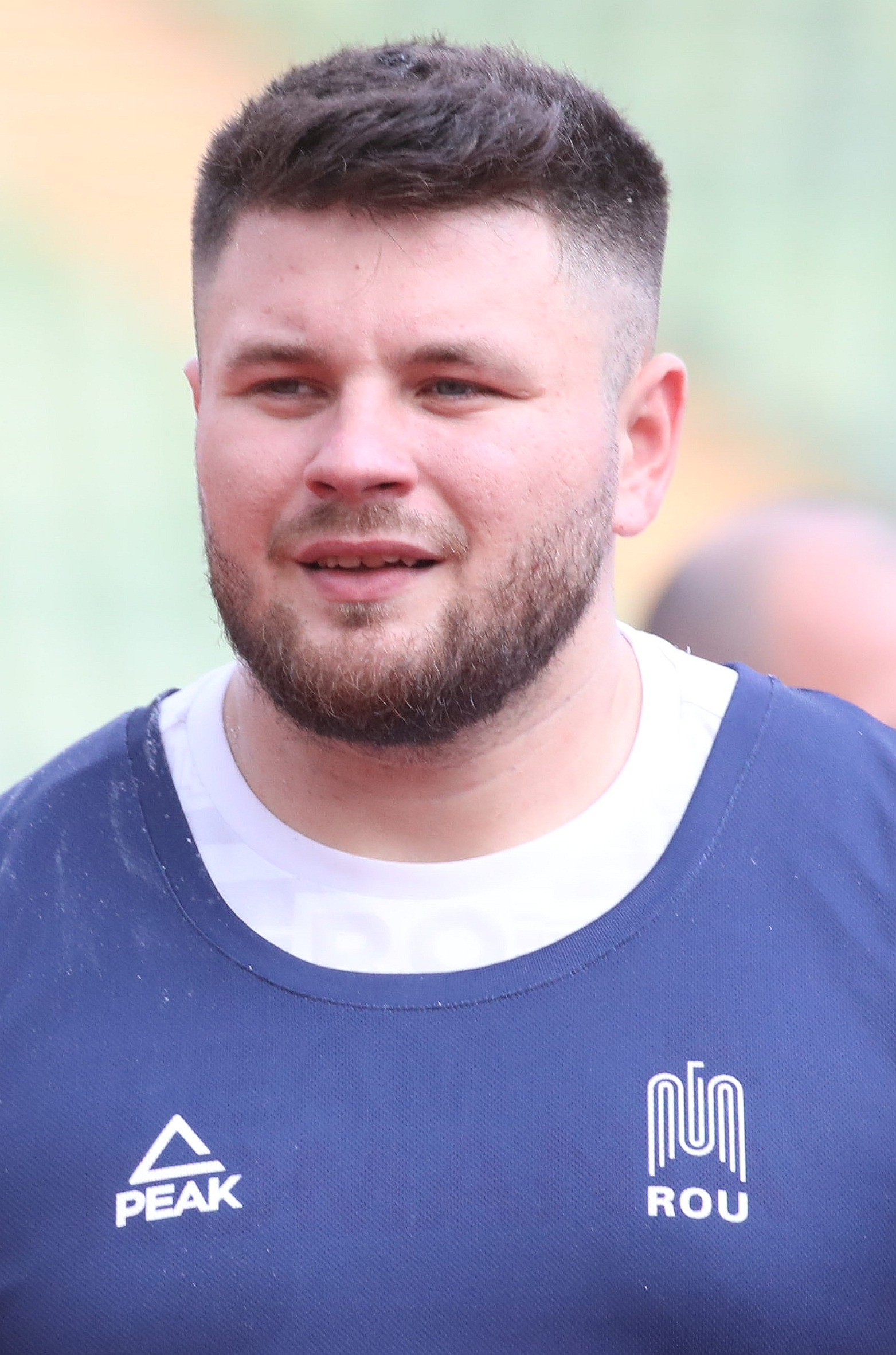

Personal information
- Born: May 26, 1997 (age 29) Râmnicu Vâlcea
- Height: 1.84 m (6 ft 0 in)
- Weight: 105 kg (231 lb)

Sport
- Sport: Athletics
- Event: Shot put
Medal record
Men's athletics
Representing Romania
European Indoor Championships
Gold medal – first place	2025 Apeldoorn	Shot put

Andrei Rareș Toader (born 26 May 1997) is a Romanian shot putter. He won several medals in age category competitions.

His personal bests in the shot put is 21.29 metres outdoors (Brno 2021) and 21.27 m indoors (Apeldoorn, 2025).

== Competition record ==
Year	Competition	Venue	Position	Event	Notes
Representing Romania
2013	European Youth Olympic Festival	Utrecht, Netherlands	2nd	Shot put (5 kg)	18.53 m
2013	European Youth Olympic Festival	Utrecht, Netherlands	3rd	Discus throw (1.5 kg)	56.49 m
2014	World Junior Championships	Eugene, United States	9th	Shot put (6 kg)	19.18 m
2014	Youth Olympic Games	Nanjing, China	2nd	Shot put (5 kg)	21.00 m
2015	European Junior Championships	Eskilstuna, Sweden	2nd	Shot put (6 kg)	20.78 m
2016	European Championships	Amsterdam, Netherlands	6th	Shot put	20.26 m
2021	Olympic Games	Tokyo, Japan	26th (q)	Shot put	19.81 m
2022	World Indoor Championships	Belgrade, Serbia	17th	Shot put	19.60 m
2022	World Championships	Eugene, United States	18th (q)	Shot put	19.83 m
2022	European Championships	Munich, Germany	12th	Shot put	19.15 m
2023	European Indoor Championships	Istanbul, Turkey	9th (q)	Shot put	20.15 m
2023	World Championships	Budapest, Hungary	–	Shot put	NM
2024	European Championships	Rome, Italy	7th	Shot put	20.43 m
2024	Olympic Games	Paris, France	18th (q)	Shot put	20.24 m
2025	European Indoor Championships	Apeldoorn, Netherlands	1st	Shot put	21.27 m
2025	World Indoor Championships	Nanjing, China	7th	Shot put	20.64 m
2025	World Championships	Tokyo, Japan	13th (q)	Shot put	20.38 m
2026	World Indoor Championships	Toruń, Poland	12th	Shot put	19.91 m
2026	European Championships	Birmingham, United Kingdom	5th	Shot put	20.80 m
