= Alin Firfirică =

Romanian discus thrower (born 1995)

Personal information
- Full name: Alin Alexandru Firfirică
- Born: 3 November 1995 (age 30) Timișoara
- Education: Ștefan cel Mare University of Suceava

Sport
- Sport: Athletics
- Event: Discus throw

Alin Alexandru Firfirică (born 3 November 1995) is a Romanian athlete specialising in the discus throw. In 2015 he won a gold medal at the 2015 European U23 Championships. Later he won silver medals at the 2017 European U23 Championships and 2017 Summer Universiade.

His personal best in the event is 67.32 metres set in Chorzów in 2019.

== International competitions ==
Year	Competition	Venue	Position	Event	Notes
Representing Romania
2013	European Junior Championships	Rieti, Italy	24th (q)	Discus throw (1.75 kg)	48.62 m
2014	World Junior Championships	Eugene, United States	19th (q)	Shot put (6 kg)	17.55 m
2014	World Junior Championships	Eugene, United States	13th (q)	Discus throw (1.75 kg)	58.23 m
2015	European Cup Winter Throwing (U23)	Leiria, Portugal	3rd	Discus throw	56.42 m
2015	European U23 Championships	Tallinn, Estonia	1st	Discus throw	60.64 m
2016	European Throwing Cup (U23)	Arad, Romania	2nd	Discus throw	59.28 m
2017	European Throwing Cup (U23)	Las Palmas, Spain	1st	Discus throw	59.62 m
2017	European U23 Championships	Bydgoszcz, Poland	2nd	Discus throw	60.17 m
2017	Universiade	Taipei, Taiwan	2nd	Discus throw	61.13 m
2018	European Championships	Berlin, Germany	7th	Discus throw	63.73 m
2019	Universiade	Naples, Italy	2nd	Discus throw	63.74 m
2019	World Championships	Doha, Qatar	4th	Discus throw	66.46 m
2019	Military World Games	Wuhan, China	1st	Discus throw	63.88 m
2021	Olympic Games	Tokyo, Japan	16th (q)	Discus throw	61.90 m
2022	World Championships	Eugene, United States	7th	Discus throw	65.57 m
2022	European Championships	Munich, Germany	7th	Discus throw	64.35 m
2023	Jeux de la Francophonie	Kinshasa, DR Congo	1st	Discus throw	64.39 m
2023	World Championships	Budapest, Hungary	29th (q)	Discus throw	61.03 m
2024	European Championships	Rome, Italy	14th (q)	Discus throw	61.72 m
2024	Olympic Games	Paris, France	11th	Discus throw	64.45 m
2026	European Championships	Birmingham, United Kingdom	14th (q)	Discus throw	61.85 m
