= Athletics at the 2019 Summer Universiade – Men's discus throw =

The men's discus throw event at the 2019 Summer Universiade was held on 11 and 13 July at the Stadio San Paolo in Naples.

== Medalists ==
Gold	Silver	Bronze
Matthew Denny; Australia	Alin Firfirică; Romania	Henning Prüfer; Germany

== Results ==
=== Qualification ===
Qualification: 62.00 m (Q) or at least 12 best (q) qualified for the final.

Rank	Group	Name	Nationality	#1	#2	#3	Result	Notes
1	A	Matthew Denny	Australia	60.32	61.46	61.61	61.61	q
2	B	Bartłomiej Stój	Poland	x	61.00	60.07	61.00	q
3	B	Henning Prüfer	Germany	53.19	59.80	60.93	60.93	q
4	B	Nicholas Percy	Great Britain	x	58.10	60.61	60.61	q
5	A	Gregory Thompson	Great Britain	x	59.57	58.97	59.57	q
6	A	Viktar Trus	Belarus	x	59.01	x	59.01	q
7	A	Maximilian Klaus	Germany	x	x	58.83	58.83	q
8	B	Alin Firfirică	Romania	x	58.60	58.73	58.73	q
9	A	Róbert Szikszai	Hungary	56.79	x	58.64	58.64	q
10	B	Werner Visser	South Africa	54.61	57.27	56.44	57.27	q
11	B	Shehab Abdalaziz	Egypt	53.27	56.59	53.44	56.59	q
12	B	Domantas Poška	Lithuania	55.28	55.87	x	55.87	q
13	B	Yusuf Yalçınkaya	Turkey	47.34	54.63	x	54.63	
14	A	Irfan Shamsuddin	Malaysia	52.75	53.03	54.28	54.28	
15	A	Rodrigo Cárdenas	Chile	x	52.49	48.09	52.49	
16	B	Edujose Lima	Portugal	52.18	x	x	52.18	
17	A	Simonas Martišius	Lithuania	x	47.19	47.49	47.49	
18	A	Juan Ignacio Carballo	Argentina	x	41.97	45.18	45.18	
	A	Mohamed Magdi Hamza Khalif	Egypt				DNS	

=== Final ===
Rank	Name	Nationality	#1	#2	#3	#4	#5	#6	Result	Notes
1st place, gold medalist(s)	Matthew Denny	Australia	63.89	62.29	62.30	63.90	65.27	64.36	65.27	
2nd place, silver medalist(s)	Alin Firfirică	Romania	61.13	61.61	63.74	62.01	x	x	63.74	
3rd place, bronze medalist(s)	Henning Prüfer	Germany	59.68	x	63.52	x	x	61.90	63.52	PB
4	Gregory Thompson	Great Britain	x	x	61.07	60.91	62.46	61.68	62.46	
5	Róbert Szikszai	Hungary	59.66	61.51	60.15	59.55	x	60.22	61.51	
6	Bartłomiej Stój	Poland	x	59.85	61.09	60.42	x	x	61.09	
7	Nicholas Percy	Great Britain	59.33	60.75	58.56	59.90	60.92	x	60.92	
8	Viktar Trus	Belarus	x	59.95	59.14	x	x	59.94	59.95	
9	Domantas Poška	Lithuania	x	56.54	59.26			59.94	59.26	
10	Werner Visser	South Africa	x	55.65	57.97			59.94	57.97	
11	Shehab Abdalaziz	Egypt	55.21	x	x			59.94	55.21	
12	Maximilian Klaus	Germany	53.81	x	x			59.94	53.81	
