= 2019 Shute Shield season =

146th season of a premier rugby union competition in Sydney

2019 Super Rugby season
- Champions: Sydney University
- Matches played: 93
- Tries scored: 717 (7.71 per match)
- Top try scorer(s): Jack Grant (Eastern Suburbs); 14 tries
- Official website: shuteshield.com

The 2019 Shute Shield season is 146th season of a premier rugby union competition in Sydney and the 97th season of the Shute Shield. The 2019 season is featuring 11 teams, following Penrith's cutting from the competition in 2018. The premiers were Sydney University, defeating Warringah by 5 points in the grand final, held at Bankwest Stadium.

== Competition format ==
The 2019 Shute Shield season will be played across 18 rounds, with each team playing each other once and eight other teams twice in a home and away format. This will be followed by a six-team play-off post season, culminating with a grand final on 24 August.

=== Teams ===
Club	Location	Home ground	Nickname	First season	Premierships
Eastern Suburbs	Upper Eastern Suburbs	Woollahra Oval, Rose Bay	The Beasties	1900	9
Eastwood	The Hills	TG Millner Field, Marsfield	The Woodies	1947	6
Gordon	Upper North Shore	Chatswood Oval, Chatswood	Highlanders	1936	8
Manly	Lower Northern Beaches	Manly Oval, Manly	The Marlins	1906	7
Northern Suburbs	Lower North Shore	North Sydney Oval, North Sydney	The Shoreman, Norths, The Red and Blacks	1900	7
Parramatta	Parramatta	Granville Park, Merrylands	Two Blues	1934	3
Randwick	Lower Eastern Suburbs	Coogee Oval, Coogee	Galloping Greens, The Wicks	1914	32
Southern Districts	St. George and The Shire	Forshaw Park, Sylvania Waters	The Rebels	1989	0
Sydney University	Camperdown	University Oval No. 2, Camperdown	The Students	1900	40
Warringah	Upper Northern Beaches	Pittwater Park, Warriewood	The Rats, Ratties	1971	1
West Harbour	Inner West	Concord Oval, Concord	Pirates	1900	2

== Standings ==
2019 Shute Shield standings
Pos	Team	P	W	D	L	PF	PA	PD	TF	TA	TB	LB	Pts
1	Sydney University	17	12	0	5	617	304	+313	93	39	13	3	64
2	Eastwood	17	12	0	5	550	420	+130	78	59	13	2	63
3	Warringah	17	13	0	4	488	408	+80	65	54	10	0	62
4	Northern Suburbs	16	9	0	7	470	426	+44	68	58	10	3	49
5	Eastern Suburbs	16	9	0	7	449	425	+24	62	53	9	2	47
6	Manly	16	8	1	7	444	465	−21	64	66	8	4	46
7	Gordon	16	8	1	7	454	391	+63	59	55	6	4	44
8	Randwick	16	7	0	9	440	441	−1	58	62	7	2	37
9	Southern Districts	17	6	0	11	446	514	−68	63	71	9	4	37
10	West Harbour	16	3	2	11	388	574	−186	46	83	5	3	24
11	Parramatta	16	1	0	15	261	639	−378	40	96	4	0	8

- Source: Shute Shield

== Play-offs ==
=== Week 1 ===
10 August
15:00

Sydney University	47–31	Manly
Try: Harry Johnson-Holmes (2); Tom Horton; Rohan O'Regan; Ben Hughes; Guy Porter; Harry Potter; Con: James Kane (5); Ben Hughes; Cards: James Kane (yellow card)	Scoreboard	Try: Michael Adams (2); Alex Dalzell; Con: Beaudein Waaka (3); Pen: Beaudein Waaka

Sydney University Football Ground

10 August
15:10

Warringah	24–7	Northern Suburbs
Try: Samuel Ward; Josh Holmes; Liam Windon; Max Girdler; Con: Harley Attwater (2)	Scoreboard	Try: Nathan Russell; Con: Angus Sinclair

Pittwater Park

10 August
15:10

Eastwood	24–21	Eastern Suburbs
Try: Rhys Allen; Barton Picone; Mark Nawaqanitawase; Con: Tayler Adams	Scoreboard	Try: Rowan Perry (2); Lalakai Foketi; Con: Mack Mason (3); Cards: Jack Turley (yellow card); Jack Grant (yellow card)

TG Millner Field

=== Week 2 ===
17 August
13:10

Eastwood	15–22	Warringah
Try: Patrick Sio; James Sarks; Con: Tayler Adams; Pen: Tayler Adams; Cards: Barton Picone (yellow card)	Scoreboard	Try: Harry Jones (2); Con: Harley Attwater; Pen: Harley Attwater; Cards: Samuel Ward (yellow card)

North Sydney Oval

17 August
15:10

Sydney University	40–7	Northern Suburbs
Try: Jake Gordon (2); Declan Moore; Rohan O'Regan; Guy Porter; Mitch Whiteley; Con: James Kane (5); Cards: Lachlan Swinton (yellow card)	Scoreboard	Try: Cameron Clark; Con: Angus Sinclair; Cards: Will Miller (yellow card)

North Sydney Oval

=== Grand Final ===
24 August
15:15

Sydney University	21–16	Warringah
	https://www.sydneyunirugby.com.au/article/match-report-students-win-back-to-back-shute-shield-premierships-with-second-half-resurgence

Bankwest Stadium
