= Guðni Valur Guðnason =

Icelandic discus thrower (born 1995)

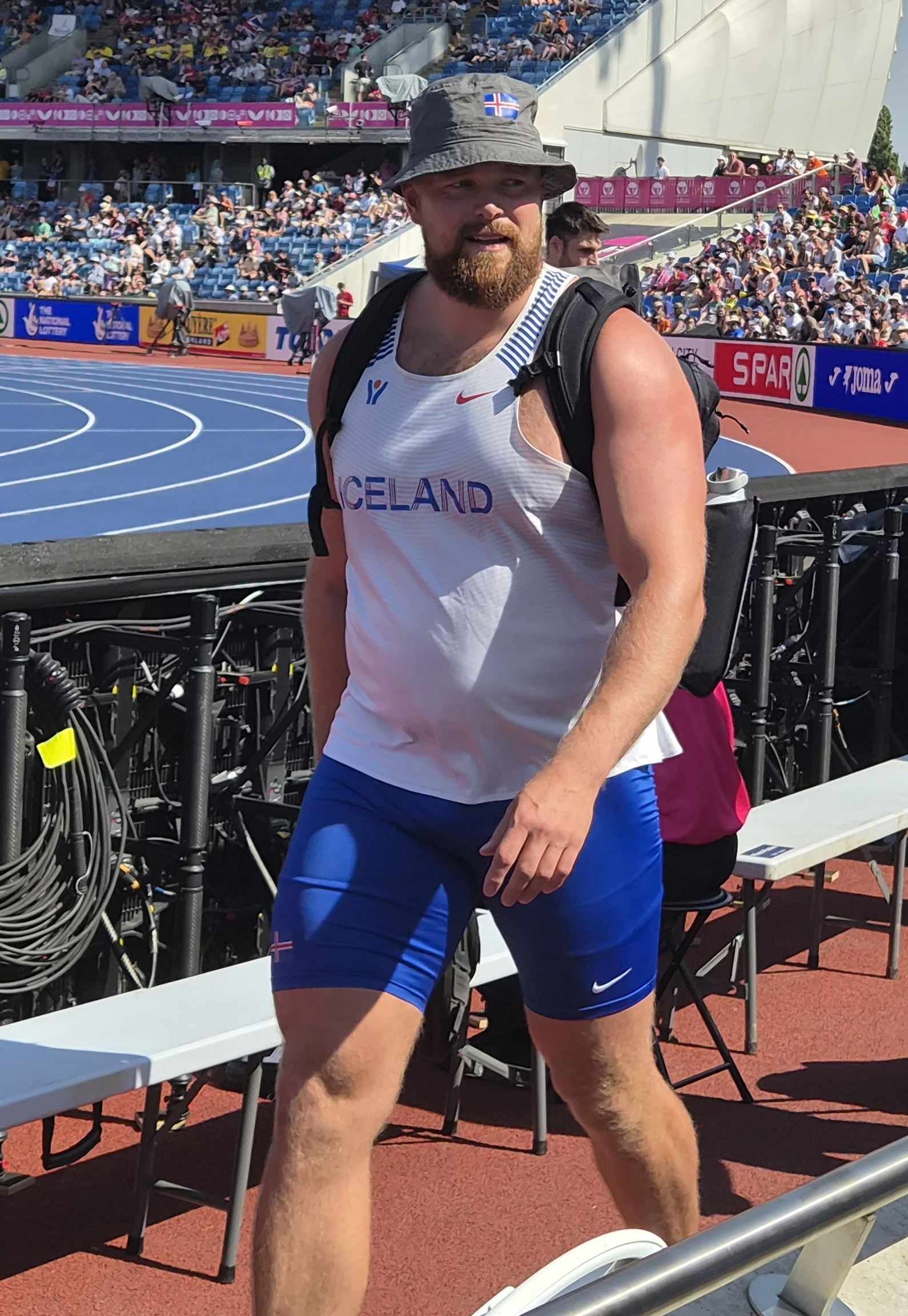
- 2026 European Championships

Personal information
- Born: 11 October 1995 (age 30)

Sport
- Sport: Athletics
- Event: Discus throw
Medal record
Men's athletics
Games of the Small States of Europe
Gold medal – first place	2015 Iceland	Discus
Gold medal – first place	2017 Serravalle	Discus
Silver medal – second place	2019 Budva	Discus
Bronze medal – third place	2019 Budva	Shot

Guðni Valur Guðnason (born 11 October 1995) is an Icelandic discus thrower who was selected to compete at the 2016 Summer Olympics in Rio de Janeiro. He failed to qualify to the finals.

His personal best in the event is 69.35 metres set in Laugardalur in 2020. He is the current Icelandic record holder.

Guðni qualified for the 2020 Summer Olympics in Tokyo, Japan.

== International competitions ==
Year	Competition	Venue	Position	Event	Notes
Representing Iceland
2015	Games of the Small States of Europe	Reykjavík, Iceland	1st	Discus throw	56.40 m
2015	European U23 Championships	Tallinn, Estonia	15th (q)	Discus throw	53.66 m
2016	Championships of the Small States of Europe	Marsa, Malta	1st	Discus throw	60.05 m
2016	European Championships	Amsterdam, Netherlands	22nd (q)	Discus throw	61.20 m
2016	Olympic Games	Rio de Janeiro, Brazil	21st (q)	Discus throw	60.45 m
2017	Games of the Small States of Europe	Serravalle, San Marino	4th	Shot put	16.96 m
2017	Games of the Small States of Europe	Serravalle, San Marino	1st	Discus throw	59.98 m
2017	European U23 Championships	Bydgoszcz, Poland	5th	Discus throw	57.31 m
2018	Championships of the Small States of Europe	Schaan, Liechtenstein	1st	Discus throw	60.25 m
2018	European Championships	Berlin, Germany	16th (q)	Discus throw	61.36 m
2019	Games of the Small States of Europe	Budva, Montenegro	3rd	Shot put	17.83 m
2019	Games of the Small States of Europe	Budva, Montenegro	2nd	Discus throw	57.64 m
2019	World Championships	Doha, Qatar	32nd (q)	Discus throw	53.91 m
2021	Olympic Games	Tokyo, Japan	–	Discus throw	NM
2022	European Championships	Munich, Germany	11th	Discus throw	61.00 m
2023	World Championships	Budapest, Hungary	22nd (q)	Discus throw	62.28 m
2024	European Championships	Rome, Italy	24th (q)	Discus throw	59.15 m
2024	Championships of the Small States of Europe	Gibraltar	1st	Discus throw	60.40 m
2026	European Championships	Birmingham, United Kingdom	20th (q)	Discus throw	57.79 m
