= Matthew Denny =

Australian athlete (born 1996)

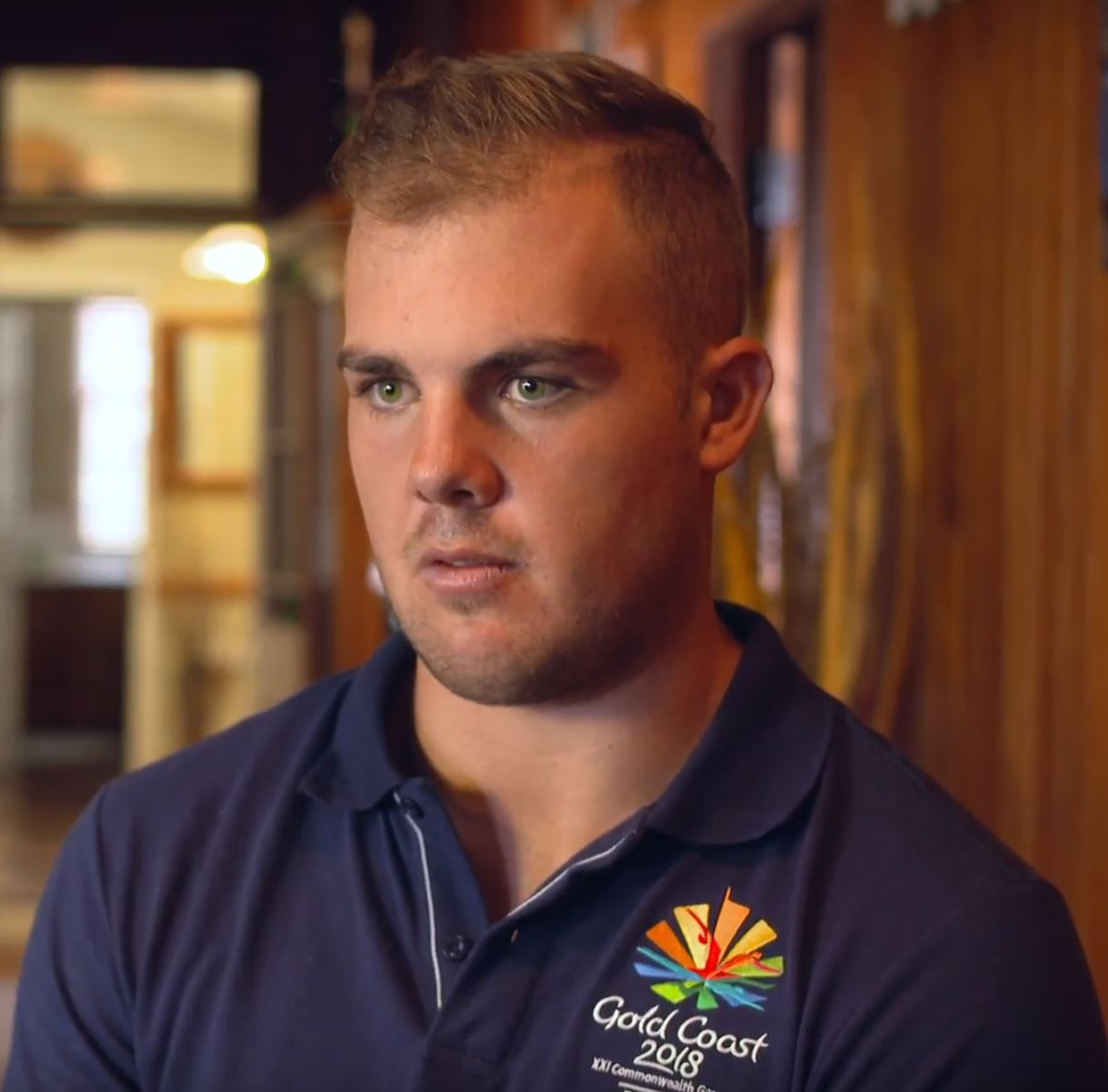
- Denny in 2018

Personal information
- Nickname: Matty
- Nationality: Australian
- Born: 2 June 1996 (age 30) Toowoomba, Queensland Australia
- Education: Toowoomba Grammar School, Griffith University
- Height: 1.96 m (6 ft 5 in)
- Weight: 120 kg (265 lb)

Sport
- Sport: Athletics
- Events: Discus throw, hammer throw
Medal record
Men's athletics
Representing Australia
Olympic Games
Bronze medal – third place	2024 Paris	Discus throw
Diamond League
First place	2023	Discus Throw
First place	2024	Discus Throw
Commonwealth Games
Gold medal – first place	2022 Birmingham	Discus throw
Gold medal – first place	2026 Glasgow	Discus throw
Silver medal – second place	2018 Gold Coast	Hammer throw

Matthew Denny (born 2 June 1996) is an Australian athlete specialising in the discus throw. He won the bronze medal in the men's discus throw at the Paris 2024 Olympics.

== Early life ==
Denny grew up in the small Queensland town of Allora (population 1000), located 60 km outside Toowoomba and 150 km south-west of Brisbane. He had plenty of space to throw things. For example, in Grade 1 at primary school he threw bean bags as shot puts and vortexes as javelins. His main focus, though, until grade 8 or 9, was rugby league. Denny was one of eight siblings and just wanted to be as good as his rugby-playing brothers.

In his teens Denny turned his attention to athletics and built a homemade discus circle on his family's rural property. In 2013, he won the World Under 18 Youth Championships discus title and then came fourth at the 2014 Under 20 World Junior Championships. He then won a silver medal at the 2015 Summer Universiade.

== Achievements ==
In April 2016, Denny won the national discus title with a throw of 60.47m and the hammer title with 68.44m. He became just the second athlete in the near 100-year history of the event to win this double and the first since Keith Pardon in 1953 – 63 years earlier.

Denny represented Australia in the discus throw at the 2016 Summer Olympics in Rio de Janeiro. At the 2018 Commonwealth Games held in Brisbane, Australia, Denny competed in both the discus and hammer throw events, coming second in the hammer throw with a PB of 74.88 metres and fourth in the discus throw. He was the second Australian athlete, and first in 68 years, to compete in both events at the Commonwealth Games, following Keith Pardon who competed in the same pair at the 1938 and 1950 Empire Games.

In February 2020 in Wellington New Zealand, Denny threw a personal best discus throw of 65.47m. In March 2021 he won the national discus title with 63.88m. In June 2021, on the Gold Coast, Queensland, he threw a 68 cm personal best of 66.15m which both qualified him for discus throw at the 2020 Summer Olympics and moved him from fifth to third Australian all-time. He competed in the final of the 2020 Olympic discus throw, throwing 67.02 m, just 0.05 m less than the bronze medalist, Lukas Weißhaidinger of Austria.

Denny won gold in the discus throw at the 2022 Commonwealth Games with a PB of 67.26 m (all five of his other throws were over 65.25 m). He won the 2023 Diamond League Final.

In the Paris 2024 Olympics, Denny secured the bronze medal in the men's discus throw with a throw of 69.31 meters, earning a spot on the podium alongside gold medalist Rojé Stona and silver medalist Mykolas Alekna. His throw was amongst the longest in Olympic history. He then threw a meeting record 69.96m to win the 2024 Diamond League final in Brussels, Belgium.

Denny set a new Australian and Oceanian record of 72.07 metres at a meet on 6 April 2025 at the Seal Throwing Club LLC / Throw Town, Ramona, Oklahoma, USA, the 5th longest discus throw in history. All five of his other throws were over 69 metres.

On 10 April 2025 Denny threw 74.25 m at the Oklahoma Throws Series, just 10cm shy of the world record, and, with a series of 71.03m, 73.46m, 74.25, 72.93m, 71.14m and 73.56m, he achieved a series average of 72.72 m, the best in history. Three days later at the same field, he bettered his own Oceania record with a 74.78m, but fell short of Mykolas Alekna's new world record of 75.56m. His mark still places him second all-time today.

== International competitions ==
Year	Competition	Venue	Position	Event	Notes
Representing Australia
2013	World Youth Championships	Donetsk, Ukraine	1st	Discus throw (1.5 kg)	67.54 m
2013	World Youth Championships	Donetsk, Ukraine	3rd	Hammer throw (5 kg)	78.67 m
2014	World Junior Championships	Eugene, United States	4th	Discus throw (1.75 kg)	62.73 m
2014	World Junior Championships	Eugene, United States	23rd (q)	Hammer throw (6 kg)	69.16 m
2015	Universiade	Gwangju, South Korea	2nd	Discus throw	62.58 m
2016	Olympic Games	Rio de Janeiro, Brazil	19th (q)	Discus throw	61.16 m
2018	Commonwealth Games	Gold Coast, Australia	4th	Discus throw	62.53 m
2018	Commonwealth Games	Gold Coast, Australia	2nd	Hammer throw	74.88 m
2019	Universiade	Naples, Italy	1st	Discus throw	65.27 m
2019	World Championships	Doha, Qatar	6th	Discus throw	65.43 m
2021	Olympic Games	Tokyo, Japan	4th	Discus throw	67.02 m
2022	World Championships	Eugene, Oregon	6th	Discus throw	66.47 m
2022	Commonwealth Games	Birmingham, England	1st	Discus throw	67.26 m PB
2023	World Championships	Budapest, Hungary	4th	Discus throw	68.24 m
2024	Australian Athletics Championships	Adelaide, Australia	1st	Discus throw	69.35 m NR
2024	Olympic Games	Paris, France	3rd	Discus throw	69.31 m
2025	World Championships	Tokyo, Japan	4th	Discus throw	65.57 m
2026	Commonwealth Games	Glasgow, United Kingdom	1st	Discus throw	67.73 m
