= Róbert Szikszai =

Hungarian discus thrower (born 1994)

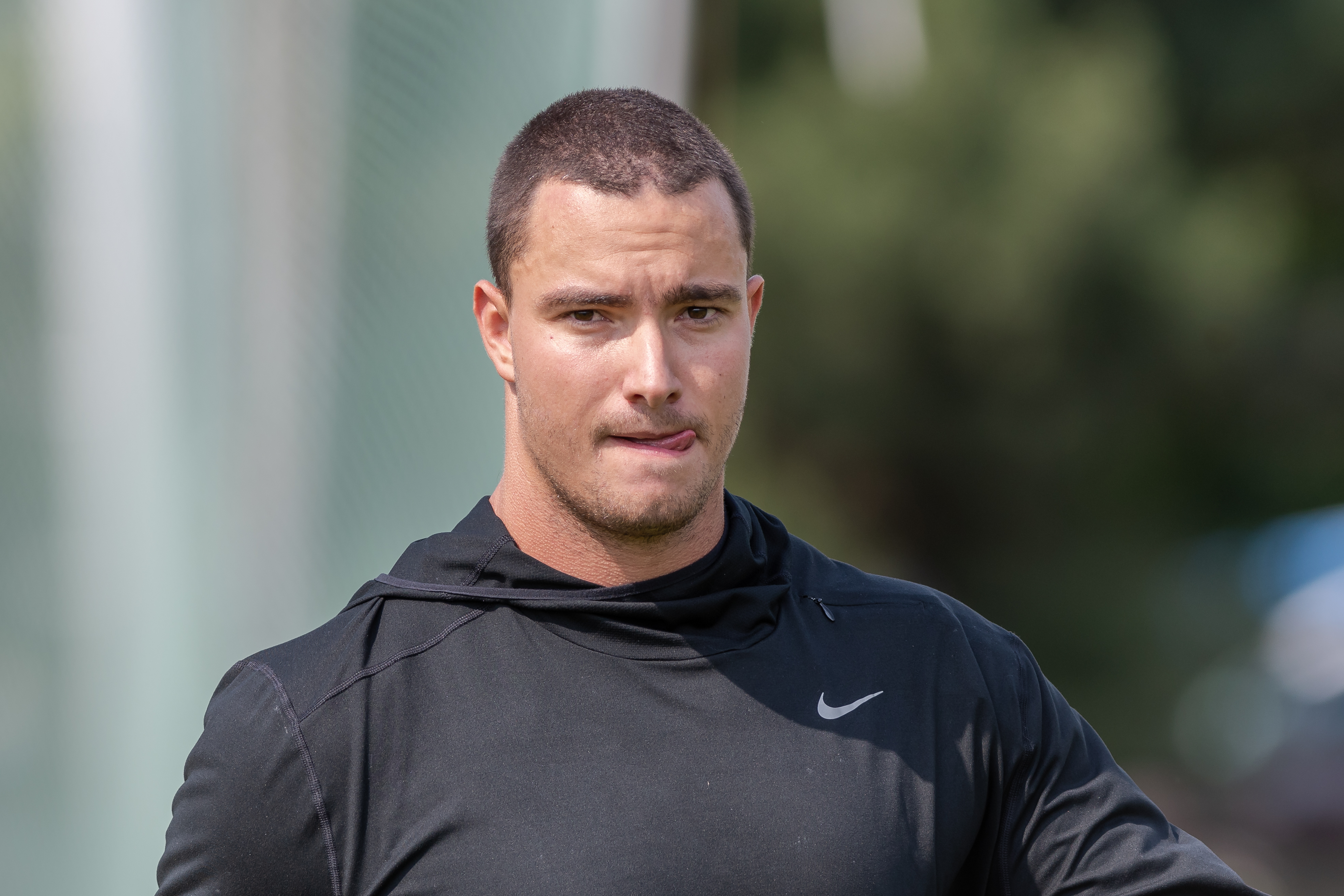

Personal information
- Born: 30 September 1994 (age 31)
- Height: 2.00 m (6 ft 7 in)
- Weight: 118 kg (260 lb)

Sport
- Sport: Athletics
- Event: Discus throw

Róbert Szikszai (born 30 September 1994) is a Hungarian athlete specialising in the discus throw. He won bronze medals at the 2015 European U23 Championships and 2017 Summer Universiade.

His personal best in the event is 66.93m set in Pusztai László Sporttelep,Szentes in 2021.

== International competitions ==
Year	Competition	Venue	Position	Event	Notes
Representing Hungary
2012	World Junior Championships	Barcelona, Spain	13th (q)	Discus throw (1.75 kg)	56.51 m 185.4 ft
2013	European Junior Championships	Rieti, Italy	1st	Discus throw (1.75 kg)	64.75 m 212.4 ft
2014	European Championships	Zürich, Switzerland	–	Discus throw	NM
2015	European U23 Championships	Tallinn, Estonia	3rd	Discus throw	58.82 m 193.0 ft
2016	European Championships	Amsterdam, Netherlands	26th (q)	Discus throw	58.01 m 190.3 ft
2017	Summer Universiade	Taipei, Taiwan	3rd	Discus throw	60.91 m 199.8 ft
2018	European Championships	Berlin, Germany	15th (q)	Discus throw	61.82 m 202.8 ft
2019	Universiade	Naples, Italy	5th	Discus throw	61.51 m 201.8 ft
2026	European Championships	Birmingham, United Kingdom	26th (q)	Discus throw	55.54 m
