= Ola Stunes Isene =

Norwegian discus thrower (born 1995)

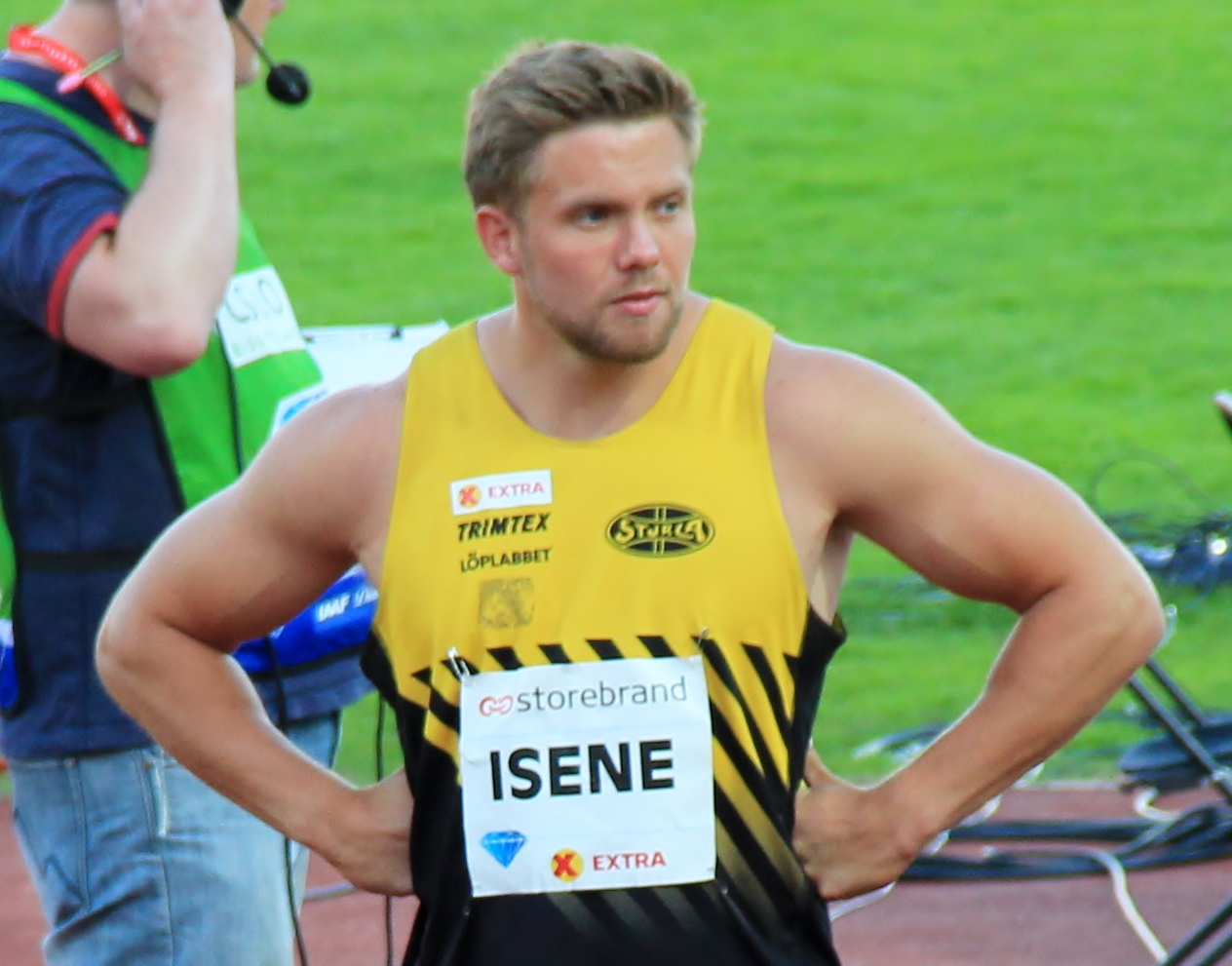
Isene at the 2018 Bislett Games

Ola Stunes Isene (born 29 January 1995, in Lier) is a Norwegian discus thrower.

He finished fifth at the 2014 World Junior Championships, eleventh at the 2017 European U23 Championships, eleventh at the 2018 European Championships and tenth at the 2019 World Championships.

He also competed at the 2013 European Junior Championships without reaching the final; and did reach the final, but did not start at the 2015 European U23 Championships.

In 2019 he made his breakthrough by throwing a giant personal best of 67.78 metres near Albufeira, then competing in the Doha Diamond League, winning the 1st League meet of the 2019 European Team Championships and placing third in The Match Europe v USA.

At the Norwegian championships he progressed from bronze medal in 2015 via silver medals in 2016 and 2017 to gold medals in 2018 and 2019. In the shot put he took the silver medal in 2015 and bronze in 2016 and 2018. Isene also won the silver medals in standing high jump in 2017 and 2018, and in the standing long jump he won the gold medal in 2017 and silver in 2018. He hails from Lier and represents the club IF Sturla.

Ola Stunes Isene's great-grandfather Torbjørn Isene was a brother to opera singer and actor Ola Isene.
