= Henning Prüfer =

German athletics competitor

Personal information
- Born: 7 March 1996 (age 30) Rostock, Germany

Sport
- Sport: Athletics
- Event: Discus throw
- Club: SC Potsdam
- Coached by: Jörg Schulte

Henning Prüfer (born 7 March 1996) is a German athlete specialising in the discus throw. He won a bronze medal at the 2019 Summer Universiade. Earlier he won a silver at the 2014 World Junior Championships.

His personal best in the event is 65.26 metres set in UNION-Stadion, Schönebeck in 2021.

His brother Clemens is also a discus thrower.

== International competitions ==
| Year | Competition | Venue | Position | Event | Notes |
Representing Germany
| 2013 | World Youth Championships | Donetsk, Ukraine | 2nd | Shot put (5 kg) | 21.94 m |
| 2013 | World Youth Championships | Donetsk, Ukraine | 2nd | Discus throw (1.5 kg) | 65.62 m |
| 2014 | World Junior Championships | Eugene, United States | 11th | Shot put (6 kg) | 19.01 m |
| 2014 | World Junior Championships | Eugene, United States | 2nd | Discus throw (1.75 kg) | 64.18 m |
| 2015 | European Junior Championships | Eskilstuna, Sweden | 3rd | Discus throw (1.75 kg) | 64.18 m |
| 2019 | Universiade | Naples, Italy | 3rd | Discus throw | 63.52 m |
