= Sebastiano Bianchetti =

Italian shot putter

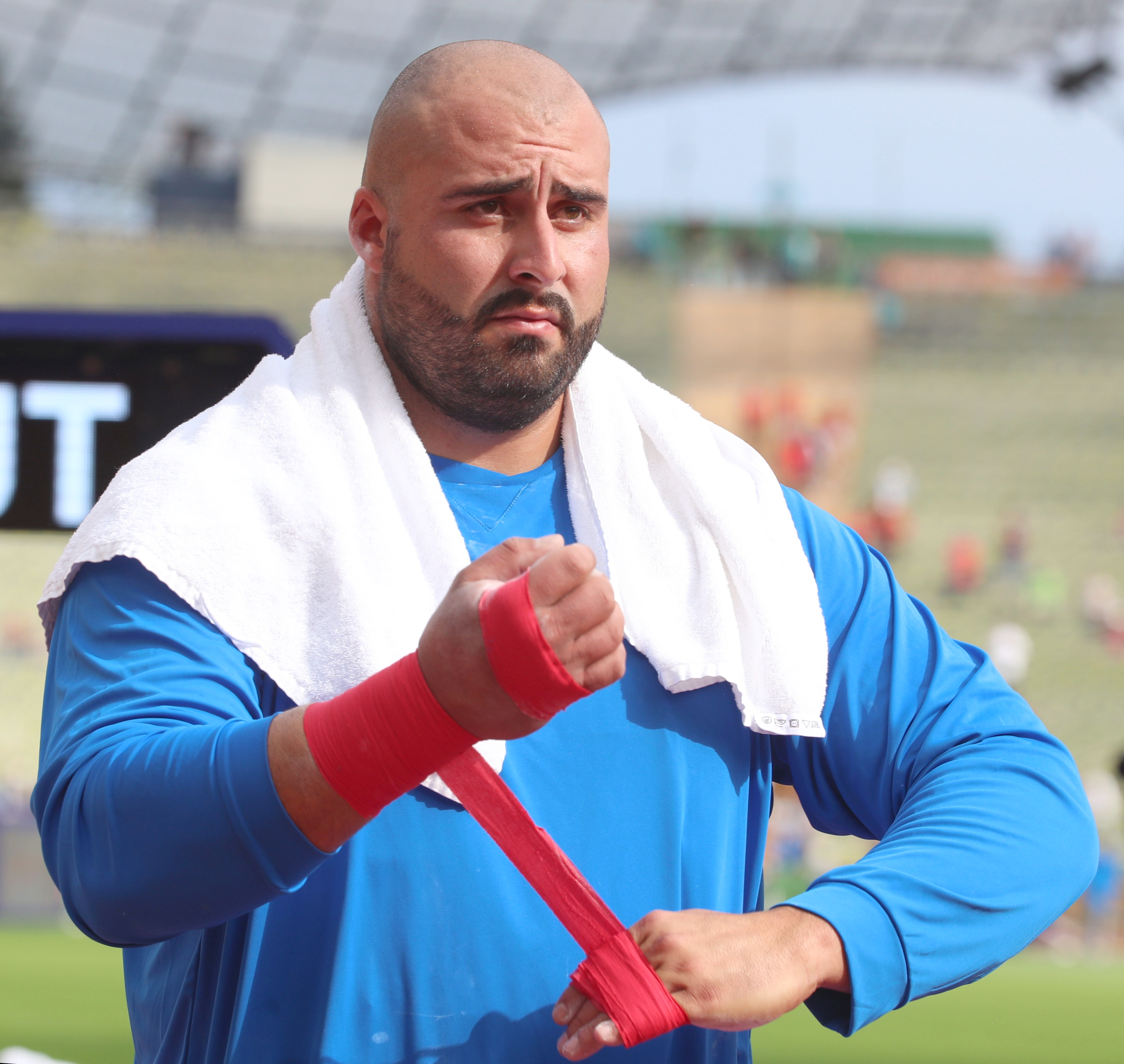
- Sebastiano Bianchetti in 2022

Personal information
- Nickname: Pippo
- Nationality: Italian
- Born: 20 January 1996 (age 30) Contigliano
- Height: 187 cm (6 ft 2 in)
- Weight: 127 kg (280 lb)

Sport
- Country: Italy
- Sport: Athletics
- Event: Shot put
- Club: G.S. Fiamme Oro
- Coached by: Paolo Dal Soglio

Achievements and titles
- Personal bests: Shot put outdoor 20.41 m (2022); Shot put indoor: 19.52 m (2017)
Medal record
European U23 Championships
Bronze medal – third place	2017 Bydgoszcz	Shot put
European Junior Championships
Bronze medal – third place	2015 Eskilstuna	Shot put

Sebastiano Bianchetti (born 20 January 1996) is an Italian male shot putter.

== Biography ==
He won two bronze medal at 2017 European Athletics U23 Championships and at 2015 European Athletics Junior Championships.

== Achievements ==
Year	Competition	Venue	Position	Event	Measure	Notes
2015	European Junior Championships	(Sweden) Eskilstuna	3rd	Shot put	20.71 m	
2016	European Throwing Cup	(Turkey) Arad	3rd	Shot put	19.78 m	
2016	Mediterranean U23 Championships	(Tunisia) Tunis	2nd	Shot put	18.77 m	
2017	European U23 Championships	(Poland) Bydgoszcz	3rd	Shot put	19.69 m	

== National titles ==
He won four national championships.

- Italian Athletics Championships
  - Shot put: 2016, 2017, 2018
- Italian Athletics Indoor Championships
  - Shot put: 2017

== See also ==
- Italian all-time lists - Shot put
