= Martin Marković =

Croatian discus thrower

Personal information
- Born: 13 January 1996 (age 29) Zagreb, Croatia
- Height: 1.85 m (6 ft 1 in)

Sport
- Country: Croatia
- Event: Discus throw
- Club: Dinamo-Zrinjevac

Martin Marković (born 13 January 1996) is a Croatian discus thrower.

He won the gold medal at the 2014 World Junior Championships (and finished sixth in the shot put), won the silver medal at the 2015 European Junior Championships, finished tenth at the 2017 Universiade and sixth at the 2018 Mediterranean Games. He also competed at the 2017 European U23 Championships without reaching the final.

His personal best throw is 65.69 metres, achieved at Budapest in 2023.
