= 2013 World Youth Championships in Athletics =

- Host city: Donetsk, Ukraine
- Events: 40
- Dates: 10–14 July
- Main venue: RSC Olimpiyskiy

The 2013 World Youth Championships in Athletics was the eighth edition of the biennial international athletics competition for youth (under-18) athletes. The five-day competition took place between 10 and 14 July at the RSC Olimpiyskiy stadium in Donetsk, Ukraine.

A record 1532 athletes (840 boys and 713 girls) from 165 nations entered themselves for the competition. Eligible athletes were aged 16 or 17 on 31 December 2013 (born in 1996 or 1997).

== Medal summary ==
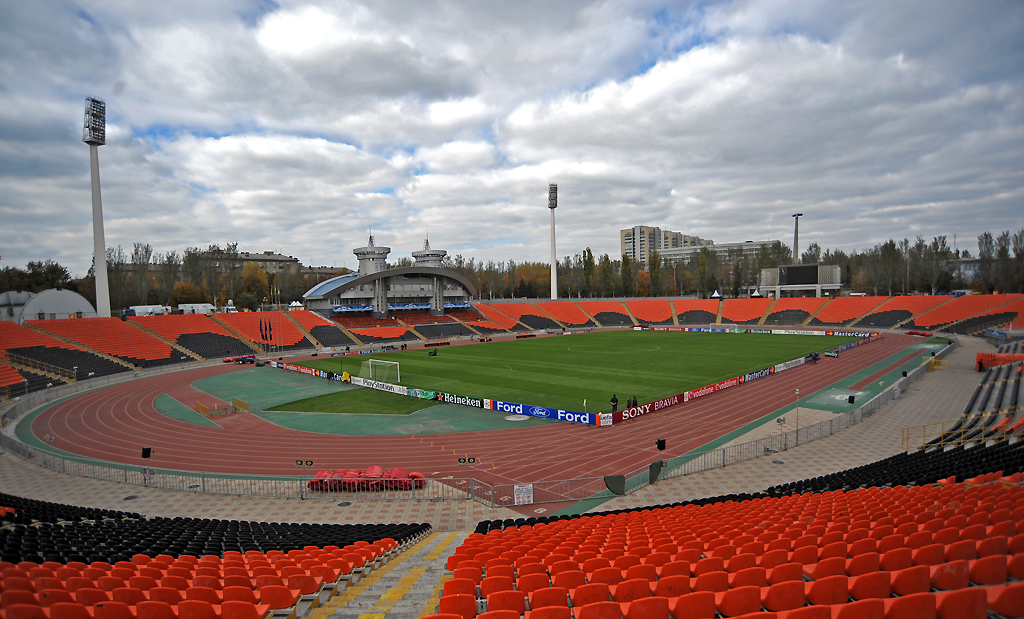
The host stadium in Donetsk

=== Boys ===
Event	Gold		Silver		Bronze	
100 metres	Mo Youxue; China	10.35; WYL	Ojie Edoburun; Great Britain	10.35; PB	Reynier Mena; Cuba	10.37; PB
200 metres	Michael O'Hara; Jamaica	20.63; WYL	Vitor Hugo dos Santos; Brazil	20.67; PB	Reynier Mena; Cuba	20.79
400 metres	Martin Manley; Jamaica	45.89; WYL	Ryan Clark; United States	46.46	Alexander Lerionka Sampao; Kenya	46.78; PB
800 metres	Alfred Kipketer; Kenya	1:48.01; PB	Konstantin Tolokonnikov; Russia	1:48.29; PB	Kyle Langford; Great Britain	1:48.32; PB
1500 metres	Robert Kiptoo Biwott; Kenya	3:36.77; CR	Tesfu Tewelde; Eritrea	3:42.14; PB	Titus Kipruto Kibiego; Kenya	3:42.97
3000 metres	Yomif Kejelcha; Ethiopia	7:53.56; PB	Vedic Kipkoech; Kenya	7:55.60	Alexander Mutiso Munyao; Kenya	7:56.86; PB
110 metres hurdles	Jaheel Hyde; Jamaica	13.13; CR	Marlon Humphrey; United States	13.24; PB	Lu Yang; China	13.33; PB
400 metres hurdles	Marvin Williams; Jamaica	50.39; WYL	Wang Yang; China	50.78	Kenneth Selmon; United States	51.30
2000 metres steeplechase	Meresa Kahsay; Ethiopia	5:19.99; WYB	Nicholas Kiptanui Bett; Kenya	5:20.92; PB	Justus Kipkorir Lagat; Kenya	5:30.00; PB
Medley relay	Waseem Williams; Michael O'Hara; Okeen Williams; Martin Manley; Jamaica	1:49.23; WYB	Jaalen Jones; Noah Lyles; Taylor McLaughlin; Ryan Clark; United States	1:50.14; SB	Daiki Oda; Shunto Nagata; Kakeru Yamaki; Kaisei Yui; Japan	1:50.52; PB
10,000 metres walk	Toshikazu Yamanishi; Japan	41:53.80; PB	Maksim Krasnov; Russia	42:03.10; PB	Diego García; Spain	42:03.32; PB
High jump	Woo Sang-Hyuk; South Korea	2.20; PB	Bai Jiaxu; China	2.18; PB	Christoff Bryan; Jamaica	2.16
Pole vault	Harry Coppell; Great Britain	5.25; PB	Huang Bokai; China	5.20; PB	Lev Skorish; Israel	5.10; PB
Long jump	Anatoliy Ryapolov; Russia	7.79	Fang Yaoqing; China	7.53	Isaiah Moore; United States	7.53; PB
Triple jump	Lázaro Martínez; Cuba	16.63 =CR	Fang Yaoqing; China	16.48; PB	Dimitri Antonov; Germany	16.02; PB
Shot put	Patrick Müller; Germany	22.02; PB	Henning Prüfer; Germany	21.94; PB	Mohamed Magdi Hamza; Egypt	20.58
Discus throw	Matthew Denny; Australia	67.54; WYL	Henning Prüfer; Germany	65.62	Cheng Yulong; China	62.80; PB
Hammer throw	Matija Greguric; Croatia	79.38; PB	Pavel Paliakou; Belarus	79.02; PB	Matthew Denny; Australia	78.67
Javelin throw	Matija Muhar; Slovenia	78.84; PB	Norbert Rivasz-Tóth; Hungary	78.27	Pablo Bugallo; Spain	76.63
Octathlon	Karsten Warholm; Norway	6451; PB	Feliks Shestopalov; Russia	6260; PB	Jan Doležal; Czech Republic	6222; PB

=== Girls ===
Event	Gold		Silver		Bronze	
100 metres	Ky Westbrook; United States	11.33; PB	Ariana Washington; United States	11.40	Ángela Tenorio; Ecuador	11.41
200 metres	Irene Ekelund; Sweden	22.92; CR	Ángela Tenorio; Ecuador	23.13; PB	Ariana Washington; United States	23.20
400 metres	Sabrina Bakare; Great Britain	52.77; PB	Olivia Baker; United States	53.38	Tiffany James; Jamaica	53.56
800 metres	Aníta Hinriksdóttir; Iceland	2:01.13; CR	Dureti Edao; Ethiopia	2:03.25; PB	Raevyn Rogers; United States	2:03.32; PB
1500 metres	Tigist Gashaw; Ethiopia	4:14.25	Dawit Seyaum; Ethiopia	4:15.51	Alexa Efraimson; United States	4:16.07
3000 metres	Lilian Kasait Rengeruk; Kenya	8:58.74; WYL	Berhan Demiesa; Ethiopia	9:00.06; PB	Silenat Yismaw; Ethiopia	9:01.63; PB
100 metres hurdles	Yanique Thompson; Jamaica	12.94; WYB	Dior Hall; United States	13.01; PB	Mikiah Brisco; United States	13.29; PB
400 metres hurdles	Helene Swanepoel; South Africa	58.08; WYL	Tia-Adana Belle; Barbados	58.42; PB	Lisa-Marie Jacoby; Germany	58.75; PB
2000 metres steeplechase	Rosefline Chepngetich; Kenya	6:14.60	Daisy Jepkemei; Kenya	6:15.12; PB	Weynshet Ansa; Ethiopia	6:30.05
Medley relay	Dior Hall; Ky Westbrook; Raevyn Rogers; Olivia Baker; United States	2:05.15; WYL	Taylor Hill; Nelda Huggins; Jonel Lacey; Tarika Moses; British Virgin Islands	2:07.40; PB	Mizuki Nakamura; Nana Fujimori; Seika Aoyama; Nanako Matsumoto; Japan	2:07.61; PB
5000 metres walk	Olga Shargina; Russia	22:13.91; WYL	Momoko Mizota; Japan	22:42.77; PB	Noemi Stella; Italy	22:48.95
High jump	Eleanor Patterson; Australia	1.88; PB	Erika Furlani; Italy	1.82; PB	Rhizlane Siba; Morocco; Julia du Plessis; South Africa	1.79
Pole vault	Robeilys Peinado; Venezuela	4.25	Alayna Lutkovskaya; Russia	4.15	Krista Obižajeva; Latvia	4.05
Long jump	Florentina Marincu; Romania	6.42	Keturah Orji; United States	6.39; PB	Natalia Chacińska; Poland	6.22; PB
Triple jump	Florentina Marincu; Romania	13.75; WYL	Wang Rong; China	13.69	Keturah Orji; United States	13.69; PB
Shot put	Emel Dereli; Turkey	20.14; CR	Alena Bugakova; Russia	18.60	Ashlie Blake; United States	17.57
Discus throw	Xie Yuchen; China	56.34; CR	Claudine Vita; Germany	52.59; PB	Liang Xinyun; China	51.50; PB
Hammer throw	Réka Gyurátz; Hungary	73.20; CR	Helga Völgyi; Hungary	71.95	Valeriia Semenkova; Ukraine	68.62; PB
Javelin throw	Mackenzie Little; Australia	61.47; CR	Yulenmis Aguilar; Cuba	59.94; PB	Anete Kocina; Latvia	54.26
Heptathlon	Celina Leffler; Germany	5747; WYB	Emma Stenlöf; Sweden	5590; PB	Louisa Grauvogel; Germany	5581

== Medal table ==
* Host nation (Ukraine)

Rank	Nation	Gold	Silver	Bronze	Total
1	Jamaica (JAM)	6	0	2	8
2	Kenya (KEN)	4	3	4	11
3	Ethiopia (ETH)	3	3	2	8
4	Australia (AUS)	3	0	2	5
5	United States (USA)	2	7	8	17
6	China (CHN)	2	6	3	11
7	Russia (RUS)	2	5	0	7
8	Germany (GER)	2	3	3	8
9	Great Britain (GBR)	2	1	1	4
10	Romania (ROU)	2	0	0	2
11	Hungary (HUN)	1	2	0	3
12	Cuba (CUB)	1	1	2	4
12	Japan (JPN)	1	1	2	4
14	Sweden (SWE)	1	1	0	2
15	South Africa (RSA)	1	0	1	2
16	Croatia (CRO)	1	0	0	1
16	Iceland (ISL)	1	0	0	1
16	Norway (NOR)	1	0	0	1
16	Slovenia (SLO)	1	0	0	1
16	South Korea (KOR)	1	0	0	1
16	Turkey (TUR)	1	0	0	1
16	Venezuela (VEN)	1	0	0	1
23	Ecuador (ECU)	0	1	1	2
23	Italy (ITA)	0	1	1	2
25	Barbados (BAR)	0	1	0	1
25	Belarus (BLR)	0	1	0	1
25	Brazil (BRA)	0	1	0	1
25	British Virgin Islands (IVB)	0	1	0	1
25	Eritrea (ERI)	0	1	0	1
30	Latvia (LAT)	0	0	2	2
30	Spain (ESP)	0	0	2	2
32	Czech Republic (CZE)	0	0	1	1
32	Egypt (EGY)	0	0	1	1
32	Israel (ISR)	0	0	1	1
32	Morocco (MAR)	0	0	1	1
32	Poland (POL)	0	0	1	1
32	Ukraine (UKR)*	0	0	1	1
Totals (37 entries)		40	40	42	122
