= Patrick Müller (shot putter) =

German shot putter

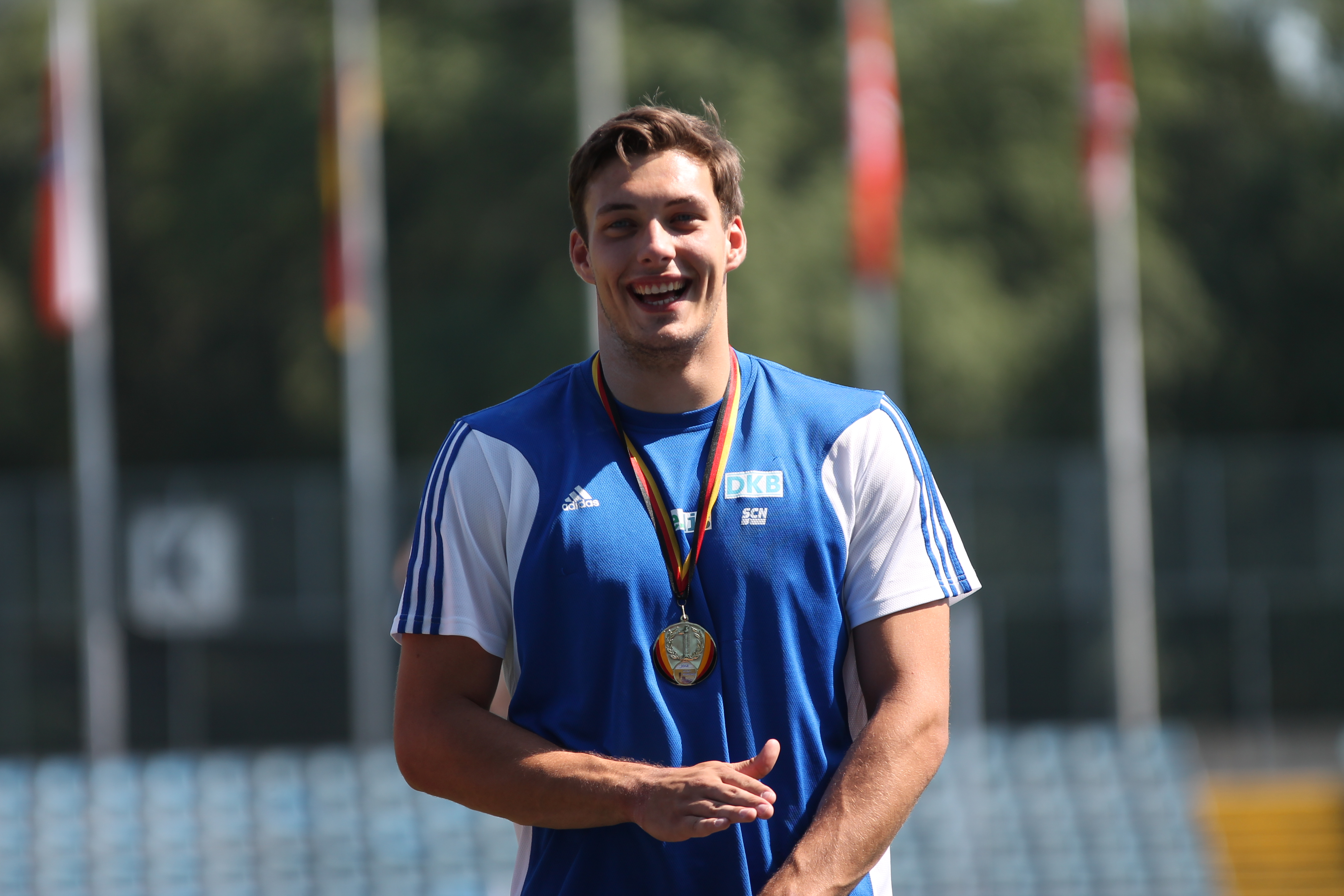

Personal information
- Born: 4 February 1996 (age 30)

Sport
- Country: Germany
- Sport: Athletics
- Event: Shot put

Achievements and titles
- Personal best: Shot put: 19.25 m (2016)

Patrick Müller (born 4 February 1996) is a German male shot putter who won two individual gold medal at the Youth World Championships.
