= 2019 in the sport of athletics =

2019 in athletics
- Major world events: 2019 World Athletics Championships

In 2019, the main athletic events were the 2019 IAAF World Cross Country Championships, the 2019 IAAF World Relays, and the 2019 World Athletics Championships.

== Major championships ==
=== World ===
- World Championships
- World Cross Country Championships
- World Relays
- World Mountain Running Championships
- World Long Distance Mountain Running Championships
- World Masters Indoor Championships
- World Para Championships
- IAU 50 km World Championships
- IAU 24 Hour World Championships
- IAU Trail World Championships
- Universiade
- World Police and Fire Games

=== Regional ===
- African Games
- African U20 Championships
- Arab Championships
- Asian Championships
- Asian Marathon Championships
- Asian Race Walking Championships
- Asian Youth Championships
- Southeast Asian Games
- South Asian Games
- East Asian Youth Games (cancelled)
- European Games
- European Athletics U23 Championships
- European Athletics U20 Championships
- European Cross Country Championships
- European Combined Events Team Championships
- European Throwing Cup
- European Cup 10,000m
- European Indoor Championships
- European Mountain Running Championships
- European Race Walking Cup
- European Team Championships
- Balkan Championships
- Games of the Small States of Europe
- European Youth Olympic Festival
- Island Games
- CARIFTA Games
- NACAC Combined Events Championships
- NACAC Cross Country Championships
- NACAC Race Walking Championships
- NACAC U18 & U23 Championships
- NACAC U20 Championships
- Pacific Games
- Pan American Games
- Pan American U20 Championships
- Pan American Race Walking Cup
- South American Championships
- South American Cross Country Championships
- South American Half Marathon Championships
- South American U20 Championships
- South American Marathon Championships
- South American Mountain Running Championships
- South American Road Mile Championships
- South American Trail Championships

== World and continental athletics events ==
- March 30: 2019 IAAF World Cross Country Championships in (Denmark) Aarhus
  - Ethiopia won both the gold and overall medal tallies.
- April 21 – 24: 2019 Asian Athletics Championships in (Qatar) Doha
  - Bahrain won the gold medal tally. China won the overall medal tally.
- May 11 & 12: 2019 IAAF World Relays in Yokohama
  - Final Rankings: 1. The United States, 2. Jamaica, 3. Japan, 4. Germany, 5. Poland
- May 24 – 26: 2019 South American Championships in Athletics in (Peru) Lima
  - Brazil won both the gold and overall medal tallies.
- June 25–28: 2019 Oceania Athletics Championships in Townsville
  - Australia won both the gold and overall medal tallies.
- September 27 – October 6: 2019 World Athletics Championships in (Qatar) Doha
  - The United States won both the gold and overall medal tallies.

== World records ==
=== Indoor ===
Event	Athlete	Nation	Result	Location	Date
Men's 1500 metres	Samuel Tefera	Ethiopia	3:31.04	Birmingham	16 February 2019
Men's Mile	Yomif Kejelcha	Ethiopia	3:47.01	Boston	3 March 2019

=== Outdoor ===
Event	Athlete	Nation	Result	Location	Date
Women's Mile	Sifan Hassan	Netherlands	4:12.33	Monaco	12 July 2019
Men's 5 km (road)	Julien Wanders	Switzerland	13:29	Monaco	17 February 2019
Women's 5 km (road)	Sifan Hassan	Netherlands	14:44	Monaco	17 February 2019
Women's 50 km walk (road)	Liu Hong	China	3:59:15	Huangshan	9 March 2019
Women's 400 meters hurdles	Dalilah Muhammad	United States	52.20	Des Moines	28 July 2019
Women's 400 meters hurdles	Dalilah Muhammad	United States	52.16	Doha	4 October 2019
Women's 2000 metres steeplechase	Gesa-Felicitas Krause	Germany	5:52.80 (Note: The 2,000 metres steeplechase is not a recognised event for record purposes, however, this represents the world's best performance)	Berlin	1 September 2019
Men's half marathon (road)	Geoffrey Kamworor	Kenya	58:01	Copenhagen	15 September 2019
Mixed 4 × 400 metres relay	Tyrell Richard; Jessica Beard; Jasmine Blocker; Obi Igbokwe	United States	3:12.42	Doha	28 September 2019
Mixed 4 × 400 metres relay	Wil London; Allyson Felix; Courtney Okolo; Michael Cherry	United States	3:09.34	Doha	29 September 2019

== Competition winners ==
=== 2019 World Marathon Majors ===
- March 3: (Japan) 2019 Tokyo Marathon
  - Winners: (Ethiopia) Birhanu Legese (m) / (Ethiopia) Ruti Aga (f)
- April 15: (United States) 2019 Boston Marathon
  - Winners: (Kenya) Lawrence Cherono (m) / (Ethiopia) Worknesh Degefa (f)
- April 28: (United Kingdom) 2019 London Marathon
  - Winners: (Kenya) Eliud Kipchoge (m) / (Kenya) Brigid Kosgei (f)
- September 29: (Germany) 2019 Berlin Marathon
  - Winners: (Ethiopia) Kenenisa Bekele (m) / (Ethiopia) Ashete Bekere (f)
- October 13: (United States) 2019 Chicago Marathon
  - Winners: (Kenya) Lawrence Cherono (m) / (Kenya) Brigid Kosgei (f) (World Record)
- November 3: (United States) 2019 New York City Marathon
  - Winners: (Kenya) Geoffrey Kamworor (m) / (Kenya) Joyciline Jepkosgei (f)

=== 2019 IAAF Diamond League ===
- May 3: Doha Diamond League in Qatar

- 200 m winners: (Turkey) Ramil Guliyev (m) / (United Kingdom) Dina Asher-Smith (f)
- 800 m winners: (Botswana) Nijel Amos (m) / (South Africa) Caster Semenya (f)
- Men's 1500 m winner: (Kenya) Elijah Manangoi
- Men's 3000 m Steeplechase winner: (Morocco) Soufiane El Bakkali
- Men's Pole Vault winner: (United States) Sam Kendricks
- Men's Shot Put winner: (United States) Ryan Crouser
- Men's Discus Throw winner: (Sweden) Daniel Ståhl

- Women's 3000 m winner: (Kenya) Hellen Obiri
- Women's 100 m Hurdles winner: (Jamaica) Danielle Williams
- Women's 400 m Hurdles winner: (United States) Dalilah Muhammad
- Women's High Jump winner: (Ukraine) Yaroslava Mahuchikh
- Women's Long Jump winner: (Colombia) Caterine Ibargüen

- May 18: IAAF Diamond League Shanghai in China (Note: The men's 200 m event does not count for points & prize money here.)

- 100 m winners: (United States) Noah Lyles (m) / (United States) Aleia Hobbs (f)
- 400 m winners: (United States) Fred Kerley (m) / (Bahrain) Salwa Eid Naser (f)
- Javelin Throw winners: (Germany) Andreas Hofmann (m) / (China) Lü Huihui (f)
- Men's 110 m Hurdles winner: (Jamaica) Omar McLeod
- Men's 400 m Hurdles winner: (Qatar) Abderrahman Samba
- Men's 5000 m winner: (Ethiopia) Yomif Kejelcha
- Men's High Jump winner: (China) Wang Yu
- Men's Long Jump winner: (Jamaica) Tajay Gayle

- Women's 1500 m winner: (Morocco) Rababe Arafi
- Women's 3000 m Steeplechase winner: (Kenya) Beatrice Chepkoech
- Women's Pole Vault winner: (Greece) Katerina Stefanidi
- Women's Shot Put winner: (United States) Chase Ealey

- May 30: Bauhaus-Galan in (Sweden) Stockholm (Note: Six events does not count for points & prize money here.)

- 200 m winners: (Canada) Aaron Brown (m) / (United Kingdom) Dina Asher-Smith (f)
- Discus Throw winners: (Sweden) Daniel Ståhl (m) / (Cuba) Denia Caballero (f)
- Men's 400 m winner: (United States) Michael Norman
- Men's 1500 m winner: (Kenya) Timothy Cheruiyot
- Men's 400 m Hurdles winner: (Norway) Karsten Warholm
- Men's Pole Vault winner: (United States) Sam Kendricks
- Men's Long Jump winner: (Sweden) Thobias Montler

- Women's 800 m winner: (United States) Ajeé Wilson
- Women's 5000 m winner: (Kenya) Agnes Jebet Tirop
- Women's 100 m Hurdles winner: (United States) Kendra Harrison
- Women's High Jump winner: (Authorised Neutral Athletes) Mariya Lasitskene (Russia)

- June 6: Golden Gala Pietro Mennea in (Italy) Rome (Note: Two events does not count for points & prize money here.)

- Men's 200 m winner: (United States) Michael Norman
- Men's 800 m winner: (United States) Donavan Brazier
- Men's 5000 m winner: (Ethiopia) Telahun Haile Bekele
- Men's 110 m Hurdles winner: (Authorised Neutral Athletes) Sergey Shubenkov (Russia)
- Men's High Jump winner: (Ukraine) Bohdan Bondarenko
- Men's Triple Jump winner: (United States) Omar Craddock
- Men's Shot Put winner: (Poland) Konrad Bukowiecki

- Women's 100 m winner: (Jamaica) Elaine Thompson
- Women's 400 m winner: (Bahrain) Salwa Eid Naser
- Women's 1500 m winner: (Ethiopia) Genzebe Dibaba
- Women's 400 m Hurdles winner: (United States) Dalilah Muhammad
- Women's Pole Vault winner: (Sweden) Angelica Bengtsson
- Women's Long Jump winner: (Germany) Malaika Mihambo
- Women's Javelin Throw winner: (China) Lü Huihui

- June 13: Bislett Games in (Norway) Oslo (Note: Three events does not count for points & prize money here.)

- 400 m Hurdles winners: (Norway) Karsten Warholm (m) / (United States) Sydney McLaughlin (f)
- Men's 100 m winner: (United States) Christian Coleman
- Men's 3000 m winner: (Ethiopia) Selemon Barega
- Men's Dream Mile winner: (Poland) Marcin Lewandowski
- Men's Pole Vault winner: (United States) Sam Kendricks
- Men's Javelin Throw winner: (Germany) Johannes Vetter

- Women's 200 m winner: (Netherlands) Dafne Schippers
- Women's 3000 m Steeplechase winner: (Kenya) Norah Jeruto
- Women's 100 m Hurdles winner: (United States) Christina Clemons
- Women's High Jump winner: (Authorised Neutral Athletes) Mariya Lasitskene (Russia)
- Women's Triple Jump winner: (Colombia) Caterine Ibargüen
- Women's Shot Put winner: (China) Gong Lijiao

- June 16: Meeting International Mohammed VI d'Athlétisme de Rabat in Morocco (Note: Two events does not count for points & prize money here.)

- 800 m winners: (Botswana) Nijel Amos (m) / (Kenya) Nelly Jepkosgei (f)
- Discus Throw winners: (Jamaica) Fedrick Dacres (m) / (Cuba) Yaime Pérez (f)
- Men's 200 m winner: (Canada) Andre De Grasse
- Men's 3000 m Steeplechase winner: (Ethiopia) Getnet Wale
- Men's 110 m Hurdles winner: (Authorised Neutral Athletes) Sergey Shubenkov (Russia)
- Men's High Jump winner: (Ukraine) Bohdan Bondarenko
- Men's Long Jump winner: (Cuba) Juan Miguel Echevarría

- Women's 100 m winner: (Nigeria) Blessing Okagbare
- Women's 400 m winner: (Bahrain) Salwa Eid Naser
- Women's 1500 m winner: (Ethiopia) Genzebe Dibaba
- Women's Pole Vault winner: (United States) Sandi Morris

- June 30: Prefontaine Classic in (United States) Eugene (Note: Three events does not count for points & prize money here.)

- Shot Put winners: (Brazil) Darlan Romani (m) / (China) Gong Lijiao (f)
- Men's 100 m winner: (United States) Christian Coleman
- Men's 400 m winner: (United States) Michael Norman
- Men's One Mile winner: (Kenya) Timothy Cheruiyot
- Men's 110 m Hurdles winner: (Spain) Orlando Ortega
- Men's 400 m Hurdles winner: (United States) Rai Benjamin
- Men's Pole Vault winner: (Sweden) Armand Duplantis

- Women's 200 m winner: (Nigeria) Blessing Okagbare
- Women's 800 m winner: (South Africa) Caster Semenya
- Women's 3000 m winner: (Netherlands) Sifan Hassan
- Women's 3000 m Steeplechase winner: (Kenya) Beatrice Chepkoech
- Women's High Jump winner: (Authorised Neutral Athletes) Mariya Lasitskene (Russia)

- July 5: Athletissima in (Switzerland) Lausanne (Note: Five events does not count for points & prize money here.)

- Men's 200 m winner: (United States) Noah Lyles
- Men's 800 m winner: (Kenya) Wycliffe Kinyamal
- Men's 1500 m winner: (Kenya) Timothy Cheruiyot
- Men's 5000 m winner: (Ethiopia) Yomif Kejelcha
- Men's 110 m Hurdles winner: (Spain) Orlando Ortega
- Men's Pole Vault winner: (Poland) Piotr Lisek
- Men's Long Jump winner: (Cuba) Juan Miguel Echevarría

- Women's 100 m winner: (Jamaica) Shelly-Ann Fraser-Pryce
- Women's 400 m winner: (Bahrain) Salwa Eid Naser
- Women's 400 m Hurdles winner: (United States) Shamier Little
- Women's High Jump winner: (Authorised Neutral Athletes) Mariya Lasitskene (Russia)
- Women's Triple Jump winner: (Colombia) Caterine Ibargüen
- Women's Shot Put winner: (Germany) Christina Schwanitz
- Women's Javelin Throw winner: (Germany) Christin Hussong

- July 12: Herculis in (Monaco) Fontvieille (Note: Two events does not count for points & prize money here.)

- Triple Jump winners: (United States) Christian Taylor (m) / (Venezuela) Yulimar Rojas (f)
- Men's 100 m winner: (United States) Justin Gatlin
- Men's 400 m winner: (The Bahamas) Steven Gardiner
- Men's 800 m winner: (Botswana) Nijel Amos
- Men's 3000 m Steeplechase winner: (Morocco) Soufiane El Bakkali
- Men's Pole Vault winner: (Poland) Piotr Lisek
- Men's Javelin Throw winner: (Germany) Andreas Hofmann

- Women's 200 m winner: (The Bahamas) Shaunae Miller-Uibo
- Women's Mile winner: (Netherlands) Sifan Hassan
- Women's 100 m Hurdles winner: (United States) Kendra Harrison
- Women's 400 m Hurdles winner: (United States) Sydney McLaughlin
- Women's High Jump winner: (Authorised Neutral Athletes) Mariya Lasitskene (Russia)

- July 20 & 21: Müller Anniversary Games in (United Kingdom) London (Note: Eight events does not count for points & prize money here.)

- 100 m winners: (South Africa) Akani Simbine (m) / (Jamaica) Shelly-Ann Fraser-Pryce (f)
- 400 m winners: (Jamaica) Akeem Bloomfield (m) / (Jamaica) Shericka Jackson (f)
- Men's 800 m winner: (Kenya) Ferguson Cheruiyot Rotich
- Men's Triple Jump winner: (Portugal) Pedro Pablo Pichardo
- Men's High Jump winner: (Syria) Majd Eddin Ghazal
- Men's Discus Throw winner: (Sweden) Daniel Ståhl

- Women's 1500 m winner: (United Kingdom) Laura Muir
- Women's 5000 m winner: (Kenya) Hellen Obiri
- Women's 100 m Hurdles winner: (Jamaica) Danielle Williams
- Women's 400 m Hurdles winner: (Jamaica) Rushell Clayton
- Women's Pole Vault winner: (Authorised Neutral Athletes) Anzhelika Sidorova (Russia)
- Women's Long Jump winner: (Germany) Malaika Mihambo
- Women's Javelin Throw winner: (Belarus) Tatsiana Khaladovich

- August 18: Müller Grand Prix Birmingham in Great Britain (Note: Four events does not count for points & prize money here.)

- Men's 100 m winner: (Jamaica) Yohan Blake
- Men's 400 m winner: (Jamaica) Akeem Bloomfield
- Men's 400 m Hurdles winner: (Turkey) Yasmani Copello
- Men's High Jump winner: (Australia) Brandon Starc
- Men's Javelin Throw winner: (Chinese Taipei) Cheng Chao-tsun

- Women's 200 m winner: (The Bahamas) Shaunae Miller-Uibo
- Women's 800 m winner: (United States) Ajeé Wilson
- Women's Mile winner: (Germany) Konstanze Klosterhalfen
- Women's 3000 m Steeplechase winner: (Kenya) Beatrice Chepkoech
- Women's 100 m Hurdles winner: (Jamaica) Danielle Williams
- Women's Pole Vault winner: (Greece) Katerina Stefanidi
- Women's Long Jump winner: (Belgium) Nafissatou Thiam
- Women's Discus Throw winner: (Cuba) Yaime Pérez

- August 24: Meeting de Paris in France (Note: Two events does not count for points & prize money here.)

- Triple Jump winners: (United States) Will Claye (m) / (Venezuela) Yulimar Rojas (f)
- Men's 200 m winner: (United States) Noah Lyles
- Men's 1500 m winner: (Uganda) Ronald Musagala
- Men's 3000 m Steeplechase winner: (Morocco) Soufiane El Bakkali
- Men's 110 m Hurdles winner: (United States) Daniel Roberts
- Men's 400 m Hurdles winner: (Norway) Karsten Warholm
- Men's High Jump winner: (Canada) Michael Mason
- Men's Shot Put winner: (New Zealand) Tom Walsh

- Women's 100 m winner: (Jamaica) Elaine Thompson
- Women's 400 m winner: (Jamaica) Stephenie Ann McPherson
- Women's 800 m winner: (United States) Hanna Green
- Women's Pole Vault winner: (Canada) Alysha Newman
- Women's Discus Throw winner: (Cuba) Denia Caballero

- August 29: Weltklasse Zürich in Switzerland (Note: Three events does not count for points & prize money here.)

- 400 m Hurdles winners: (Norway) Karsten Warholm (m) / (United States) Sydney McLaughlin (f)
- Javelin Throw winners: (Estonia) Magnus Kirt (m) / (China) Lü Huihui (f)
- Men's 100 m winner: (United States) Noah Lyles
- Men's 800 m winner: (United States) Donavan Brazier
- Men's 5000 m winner: (Uganda) Joshua Cheptegei
- Men's High Jump winner: (Ukraine) Andriy Protsenko
- Men's Pole Vault winner: (United States) Sam Kendricks
- Men's Long Jump winner: (Cuba) Juan Miguel Echevarría

- Women's 200 m winner: (The Bahamas) Shaunae Miller-Uibo
- Women's 400 m winner: (Bahrain) Salwa Eid Naser
- Women's 1500 m winner: (Netherlands) Sifan Hassan
- Women's 3000 m Steeplechase winner: (Kenya) Beatrice Chepkoech
- Women's Triple Jump winner: (Jamaica) Shanieka Ricketts
- Women's Shot Put winner: (China) Gong Lijiao

- September 6: Memorial Van Damme (final) in (Belgium) Brussels (Note: Two events does not count for points & prize money here.)

- Discus Throw winners: (Sweden) Daniel Ståhl (m) / (Cuba) Yaime Pérez (f)
- Men's 200 m winner: (United States) Noah Lyles
- Men's 400 m winner: (United States) Michael Norman
- Men's 1500 m winner: (Kenya) Timothy Cheruiyot
- Men's 3000 m Steeplechase winner: (Ethiopia) Getnet Wale
- Men's 110 m Hurdles winner: (Spain) Orlando Ortega
- Men's Triple Jump winner: (United States) Christian Taylor
- Men's Shot Put winner: (New Zealand) Tom Walsh

- Women's 100 m winner: (United Kingdom) Dina Asher-Smith
- Women's 800 m winner: (United States) Ajeé Wilson
- Women's 5000 m winner: (Netherlands) Sifan Hassan
- Women's 100 m Hurdles winner: (Jamaica) Danielle Williams
- Women's High Jump winner: (Authorised Neutral Athletes) Mariya Lasitskene (Russia)
- Women's Pole Vault winner: (Greece) Katerina Stefanidi
- Women's Long Jump winner: (Germany) Malaika Mihambo

=== 2019 IAAF World Challenge & IAAF Hammer Throw Challenge ===
- April 28: Grande Premio Brasil Caixa de Atletismo in (Brazil) Bragança Paulista

- 400 m Hurdles winners: (Brazil) Alison dos Santos (m) / (Jamaica) Nikita Tracey (f)
- Shot Put winners: (Nigeria) Chukwuebuka Enekwechi (m) / (United States) Jessica Ramsey (f)
- Men's 200 m winner: (Colombia) Bernardo Baloyes
- Men's 800 m winner: (Kenya) Alfred Kipketer
- Men's 1500 m winner: (Kenya) Michael Kibet
- Men's 110 m Hurdles winner: (Brazil) Gabriel Constantino
- Men's Pole Vault winner: (Brazil) Augusto Dutra de Oliveira
- Men's Long Jump winner: (Uruguay) Emiliano Lasa
- Men's Hammer Throw winner: (United Kingdom) Nick Miller

- Women's 400 m winner: (Sierra Leone) Maggie Barrie
- Women's 3000 m winner: (Kenya) Daisy Jepkemei
- Women's 100 m Hurdles winner: (Costa Rica) Andrea Carolina Vargas
- Women's Discus Throw winner: (United States) Valarie Allman

- May 19: Golden Grand Prix in (Japan) Osaka

- 100 m winners: (United States) Justin Gatlin (m) / (United States) Mikiah Brisco (f)
- 200 m winners: (United States) Michael Norman (m) / (Bulgaria) Ivet Lalova-Collio (f)
- 800 m winners: (Kenya) Jonathan Kitilit (m) / (Benin) Noélie Yarigo (f)
- 3000 m Steeplechase winners: (Kenya) Philemon Kiplagat Ruto (m) / (Japan) Yukari Ishizawa (f)
- 400 m Hurdles winners: (Japan) Masaki Toyoda (m) / (United States) Dalilah Muhammad (f)
- Long Jump winners: (Japan) Natsuki Yamakawa (m) / (Australia) Brooke Stratton (f)
- Javelin Throw winners: (Lithuania) Edis Matusevičius (m) / (China) YU Yuzhen (f)
- Men's 400 m winner: (United States) Vernon Norwood
- Men's 110 m Hurdles winner: (Japan) Shunsuke Izumiya
- Men's High Jump winner: (Japan) Naoto Tobe
- Men's Pole Vault winner: (China) Huang Bokai
- Men's Triple Jump winner: (United States) Omar Craddock

- Women's 100 m Hurdles winner: (United States) Sharika Nelvis
- Women's Hammer Throw winner: (China) Wang Zheng

- May 21: 2019 Nanjing World Challenge in China

- 800 m winners: (Botswana) Nijel Amos (m) / (Kenya) Nelly Jepkosgei (f)
- Long Jump winners: (Jamaica) Tajay Gayle (m) / (United Kingdom) Jazmin Sawyers (f)
- Men's 100 m winner: (United States) Mike Rodgers
- Men's 3000 m Steeplechase winner: (Kenya) Benjamin Kigen
- Men's 110 m Hurdles winner: (Spain) Orlando Ortega
- Men's 400 m Hurdles winner: (Japan) Takatoshi Abe
- Men's High Jump winner: (China) Wang Yu
- Men's Triple Jump winner: (United States) Christian Taylor
- Men's Javelin Throw winner: (Germany) Thomas Röhler

- Women's 200 m winner: (Jamaica) Elaine Thompson
- Women's 1500 m winner: (Ethiopia) Gudaf Tsegay
- Women's 100 m Hurdles winner: (United States) Brianna Rollins-McNeal
- Women's Shot Put winner: (China) Gong Lijiao
- Women's Hammer Throw winner: (China) Wang Zheng

- June 9: Fanny Blankers-Koen Games in (Netherlands) Hengelo (World Challenge only)

- 100 m winners: (Ivory Coast) Arthur Cissé (m) / (Netherlands) Dafne Schippers (f)
- 5000 m winners: (Ethiopia) Telahun Haile Bekele (m) / (Kenya) Margaret Chelimo Kipkemboi (f)
- Men's 400 m winner: (United States) Michael Cherry
- Men's 800 m winner: (Kenya) Cornelius Tuwei
- Men's 110 m Hurdles winner: (Spain) Orlando Ortega
- Men's Pole Vault winner: (United States) Sam Kendricks
- Men's Long Jump winner: (South Africa) Luvo Manyonga

- Women's 100 m Hurdles winner: (United States) Nia Ali
- Women's High Jump winner: (Sweden) Erika Kinsey

- June 11: Paavo Nurmi Games in (Finland) Turku

- 100 m winners: (United States) Mike Rodgers (m) / (Canada) Crystal Emmanuel (f)
- Triple Jump winners: (China) Zhu Yaming (m) / (Bulgaria) Gabriela Petrova (f)
- Men's 800 m winner: (Kenya) Cornelius Tuwei
- Men's 3000 m Steeplechase winner: (United States) Andrew Bayer
- Men's 110 m Hurdles winner: (Brazil) Eduardo de Deus
- Men's Long Jump winner: (China) Zhang Yaoguang
- Men's Discus Throw winner: (Jamaica) Fedrick Dacres
- Men's Javelin Throw winner: (Estonia) Magnus Kirt

- Women's 1500 m winner: (Uganda) Winnie Nanyondo
- Women's 100 m Hurdles winner: (United States) Christina Clemons
- Women's Pole Vault winner: (Canada) Alysha Newman
- Women's Shot Put winner: (United States) Chase Ealey
- Women's Hammer Throw winner: (Poland) Anita Włodarczyk

- June 12: 19th European Athletics Festival Bydgoszcz in Poland (Hammer Throw Challenge only)
  - Men's Hammer Throw winner: (Poland) Wojciech Nowicki
- June 16: Janusz Kusociński Memorial in (Poland) Chorzów (Hammer Throw Challenge only)
  - Men's Hammer Throw winner: (Poland) Paweł Fajdek
- June 20: Golden Spike Ostrava in the Czech Republic

- Javelin Throw winners: (Estonia) Magnus Kirt (m) / (Croatia) Sara Kolak (f)
- Men's 100 m winner: (United States) Mike Rodgers
- Men's 200 m winner: (Canada) Andre De Grasse
- Men's 400 m winner: (The Bahamas) Steven Gardiner
- Men's 800 m winner: (Bosnia and Herzegovina) Amel Tuka
- Men's One Mile winner: (United Kingdom) Charlie Grice
- Men's Pole Vault winner: (United States) Sam Kendricks
- Men's Long Jump winner: (Cuba) Juan Miguel Echevarría
- Men's Shot Put winner: (New Zealand) Tom Walsh

- Women's 300 m winner: (The Bahamas) Shaunae Miller-Uibo
- Women's 1500 m winner: (Ethiopia) Gudaf Tsegay
- Women's High Jump winner: (Authorised Neutral Athletes) Mariya Lasitskene (Russia)
- Women's Hammer Throw winner: (China) Wang Zheng

- July 9: István Gyulai Memorial in (Hungary) Székesfehérvár (Hammer Throw Challenge only)
  - Men's Hammer Throw winner: (Poland) Paweł Fajdek
- August 27: Pál Németh Memorial in (Hungary) Szombathely (Hammer Throw Challenge only)
  - Hammer Throw winners: (Hungary) Bence Halász (m) / (United States) DeAnna Price (f)
- September 1: ISTAF Berlin in Germany (World Challenge only)

- 100 m winners: (Canada) Andre De Grasse (m) / (Poland) Ewa Swoboda (f)
- Men's 1500 m winner: (United States) Joshua Thompson
- Men's 110 m Hurdles winner: (Jamaica) Omar McLeod
- Men's 400 m Hurdles winner: (Germany) Luke Campbell
- Men's High Jump winner: (Germany) Mateusz Przybylko
- Men's Pole Vault winner: (Sweden) Armand Duplantis
- Men's Discus Throw winner: (Poland) Piotr Małachowski
- Men's Javelin Throw winner: (Germany) Johannes Vetter

- Women's 5000 m winner: (Kenya) Daisy Jepkemei
- Women's 2000 m Steeplechase winner: (Germany) Gesa-Felicitas Krause
- Women's 100 m Hurdles winner: (Nigeria) Oluwatobiloba Amusan
- Women's Long Jump winner: (Germany) Malaika Mihambo
- Women's Triple Jump winner: (Jamaica) Shanieka Ricketts
- Women's Shot Put winner: (Canada) Brittany Crew

- September 3: IWC Zagreb 2019 in Croatia (World Challenge only & final)

- Men's 100 m winner: (United States) Mike Rodgers
- Men's 800 m winner: (Bosnia and Herzegovina) Amel Tuka
- Men's 3000 m Steeplechase winner: (Canada) Matthew Hughes
- Men's 110 m Hurdles winner: (Barbados) Shane Brathwaite
- Men's Long Jump winner: (South Africa) Luvo Manyonga
- Men's Triple Jump winner: (United States) Chris Benard
- Men's Shot Put winner: (New Zealand) Tom Walsh

- Women's 200 m winner: (Slovenia) Maja Mihalinec
- Women's 400 m winner: (United States) Phyllis Francis
- Women's 1500 m winner: (United States) Kate Grace
- Women's 100 m Hurdles winner: (United States) Sharika Nelvis
- Women's Discus Throw winner: (Croatia) Sandra Perković
- Women's Javelin Throw winner: (Croatia) Sara Kolak

- September 27 – October 6: Part of the 2019 World Athletics Championships in (Qatar) Doha (Hammer Throw Challenge only & final)
  - Winners: (Poland) Paweł Fajdek (m) / (United States) DeAnna Price (f)

=== 2019 IAAF World Indoor Tour ===
- January 26: New Balance Indoor Grand Prix in (United States) Boston

- 300 m winners: (United States) Rai Benjamin (m) / (United States) Kendall Ellis (f)
- One Mile winners: (Ethiopia) Yomif Kejelcha (m) / (Canada) Gabriela Stafford (f)
- Men's 400 m winner: (United States) Nathan Strother
- Men's 800 m winner: (United States) Donavan Brazier
- Men's 3000 m winner: (Ethiopia) Hagos Gebrhiwet
- Men's 60 m Hurdles winner: (United States) Jarret Eaton

- Women's 60 m winner: (Trinidad and Tobago) Michelle-Lee Ahye
- Women's 500 m winner: (United States) Sydney McLaughlin
- Women's 600 m winner: (United States) Raevyn Rogers
- Women's 5000 m winner: (Germany) Konstanze Klosterhalfen
- Women's Pole Vault winner: (United States) Katie Nageotte
- Women's Shot Put winner: (United States) Magdalyn Ewen

- February 2: Weltklasse in Karlsruhe in Germany

- Men's 400 m winner: (Germany) Marc Koch
- Men's 800 m winner: (Sweden) Andreas Kramer
- Men's 1500 m winner: (Kenya) Vincent Kibet
- Men's High Jump winner: (Japan) Naoto Tobe
- Men's Long Jump winner: (Sweden) Thobias Nilsson Montler

- Women's 60 m winner: (Poland) Ewa Swoboda
- Women's 3000 m winner: (United Kingdom) Melissa Courtney
- Women's 60 m Hurdles winner: (Netherlands) Nadine Visser
- Women's Pole Vault winner: (Canada) Alysha Newman
- Women's Triple Jump winner: (Spain) Ana Peleteiro

- February 6: Copernicus Cup in (Poland) Toruń

- 400 m winners: (United States) Nathan Strother (m) / (Poland) Anna Kiełbasińska (f)
- 800 m winners: (United States) Erik Sowinski (m) / (Ethiopia) Habitam Alemu (f)
- 60 m Hurdles winners: (Spain) Orlando Ortega (m) / (Germany) Pamela Dutkiewicz (f)
- Men's 1500 m winner: (Ethiopia) Samuel Tefera
- Men's High Jump winner: (Authorised Neutral Athletes) Ilya Ivanyuk (Russia)
- Men's Pole Vault winner: (United States) Sam Kendricks
- Men's Long Jump winner: (Cuba) Juan Miguel Echevarría

- Women's 60 m winner: (Poland) Ewa Swoboda
- Women's Shot Put winner: (Germany) Christina Schwanitz

- February 8: Madrid Indoor Meeting in Spain

- 60 m winners: (United States) Mike Rodgers (m) / (Poland) Ewa Swoboda (f)
- 1500 m winners: (Kenya) Bethwell Birgen (m) / (Poland) Sofia Ennaoui (f)
- Men's 400 m winner: (United States) Nathan Strother
- Men's 800 m winner: (Kenya) Cornelius Tuwei
- Men's 60 m Hurdles winner: (United States) Jarret Eaton
- Men's Long Jump winner: (Greece) Miltiadis Tentoglou
- Men's Shot Put winner: (Germany) David Storl

- Women's 3000 m winner: (Ethiopia) Alemaz Samuel
- Women's Pole Vault winner: (Authorised Neutral Athletes) Anzhelika Sidorova (Russia)
- Women's Triple Jump winner: (Venezuela) Yulimar Rojas

- February 16: Müller Indoor Grand Prix Birmingham in Great Britain

- 60 m winners: (China) Su Bingtian (m) / (Jamaica) Elaine Thompson (f)
- 400 m winners: (United States) Nathan Strother (m) / (Jamaica) Stephenie Ann McPherson (f)
- 800 m winners: (Australia) Joseph Deng (m) / (United Kingdom) Shelayna Oskan-Clarke (f)
- 60 m Hurdles winners: (United States) Jarret Eaton (m) / (United States) Evonne Britton (f)
- Long Jump winners: (Cuba) Juan Miguel Echevarría (m) / (Serbia) Ivana Španović (f)
- Men's 1500 m winner: (Ethiopia) Samuel Tefera
- Men's High Jump winner: (Japan) Naoto Tobe

- Women's One Mile winner: (United Kingdom) Laura Muir
- Women's 3000 m winner: (Ethiopia) Alemaz Samuel
- Women's Pole Vault winner: (United Kingdom) Holly Bradshaw

- February 20: PSD Bank Meeting (final) in (Germany) Düsseldorf

- 60 m winners: (China) Su Bingtian (m) / (Ivory Coast) Marie-Josée Ta Lou (f)
- 400 m winners: (United States) Nathan Strother (m) / (Germany) Lena Naumann (f)
- 800 m winners: (Spain) Álvaro de Arriba (m) / (Ethiopia) Habitam Alemu (f)
- Men's 1500 m winner: (Norway) Jakob Ingebrigtsen
- Men's 60 m Hurdles winner: (Spain) Orlando Ortega
- Men's High Jump winner: (Japan) Naoto Tobe

- Women's Pole Vault winner: (Authorised Neutral Athletes) Anzhelika Sidorova (Russia)
- Women's Triple Jump winner: (Venezuela) Yulimar Rojas
- Women's Shot Put winner: (Germany) Christina Schwanitz

=== 2019 IAAF Combined Events Challenge ===
- April 27 & 28: Multistars in (Italy) Lana
  - Decathlon winner: (Czech Republic) Jan Doležal (8,117 points)
  - Heptathlon winner: (United States) Annie Kunz (5,971 points)
- May 25 & 26: Hypo-Meeting in (Austria) Götzis
  - Decathlon winner: (Canada) Damian Warner (8,711 points)
  - Heptathlon winner: (United Kingdom) Katarina Johnson-Thompson (6,813 points)
- June 8 & 9: IX Meeting Internacional Arona 2019 in Spain
  - Decathlon winner: (Norway) Martin Roe (8,037 points)
  - Heptathlon winner: (Austria) Verena Preiner (6,472 points)
- June 22 & 23: Décastar in (France) Talence
  - Decathlon winner: (Canada) Pierce Lepage (8,453 points)
  - Heptathlon winner: (Belgium) Nafissatou Thiam (6,819 points)
- June 29 & 30: Stadtwerke Ratingen Mehrkampf-Meeting in Germany
  - Decathlon winner: (Germany) Kai Kazmirek (8,444 points)
  - Heptathlon winner: (Austria) Verena Preiner (6,591 points)
- July 6 & 7: European Cup Combined Events – Super League in (Ukraine) Lutsk
  - Decathlon winner: (Belarus) Vital Zhuk (8,237 points)
  - Heptathlon winner: (Ukraine) Daryna Sloboda (6,165 points)
- July 6 & 7: European Cup Combined Events – First & Second League in (Portugal) Ribeira Brava, Madeira
  - First League winners: (Czech Republic) Jiří Sýkora (Decathlon -> 8,104 points) / (Czech Republic) Kateřina Cachová (Heptathlon -> 6,034 points)
  - Second League winners: (Belgium) Niels Pittomvils (Decathlon -> 7,837 points) / (Belgium) Noor Vidts (Heptathlon -> 6,027 points)
  - League Team winners: Czech Republic (40,519 points) (First League) / Belgium (38,165 points) (Second League)
- July 25–28: Part of the 2019 USA Outdoor Track and Field Championships in (United States) Des Moines, Iowa
  - Decathlon winner: (Georgia (U.S. state)) Devon Williams (8,295 points)
  - Heptathlon winner: (Tennessee) Erica Bougard (6,663 points)
- September 27 – October 6: Part of the 2019 World Championships in Athletics (final) in (Qatar) Doha
  - Decathlon winner: (Germany) Niklas Kaul (8,691 points)
  - Heptathlon winner: (United Kingdom) Katarina Johnson-Thompson (6,981 points)

=== 2019 IAAF Cross Country Permit ===
- November 11, 2018: Cross de Atapuerca in (Spain) Burgos
  - Winners: (Uganda) Jacob Kiplimo (m) / (Ethiopia) Senbere Teferi (f)
- November 18, 2018: Cross Internacional de Soria in (Spain) Soria
  - Winners: (Uganda) Jacob Kiplimo (m) / (Kenya) Gloria Kite (f)
- November 25, 2018: Cross Internacional de la Constitución in (Spain) Alcobendas
  - Winners: (Uganda) Jacob Kiplimo (m) / (Kenya) Eva Cherono (f)
- January 6: Campaccio in (Italy) San Giorgio su Legnano
  - Winners: (Ethiopia) Hagos Gebrhiwet (m) / (Turkey) Yasemin Can (f)
- January 13: Cross Internacional Juan Muguerza in (Spain) Elgoibar
  - Winners: (Kenya) Rhonex Kipruto (m) / (Kenya) Hellen Obiri (f)
- January 19: Northern Ireland International Cross Country in (United Kingdom) Dundonald (Belfast)
  - Winners: (Bahrain) Birhanu Balew (m) / (Ethiopia) Meskerem Mamo (f)
- January 20: Cross Internacional de Itálica in (Spain) Seville
  - Winners: (Uganda) Jacob Kiplimo (m) / (Kenya) Beatrice Chepkoech (f)
- January 27: Cinque Mulini in (Italy) San Vittore Olona
  - Winners: (Kenya) Jairus Birech (m) / (Bahrain) Winfred Mutile Yavi (f)
- February 3: Almond Blossom Cross Country (final) in (Portugal) Albufeira
  - Winners: (Uganda) Jacob Kiplimo (m) / (Kenya) Fancy Cherono (f)

=== 2019 IAAF Race Walking Challenge ===
- February 10: Oceania Race Walking Championships (20 km) in (Australia) Adelaide
  - 20 km winners: (Sweden) Perseus Karlström (m) / (Colombia) Sandra Arenas (f)
- March 17: Asian Race Walking Championships (20 km) in (Japan) Nomi
  - 20 km winners: (Japan) Toshikazu Yamanishi (m) / (China) MA Zhenxia (f)
- April 6: Grande Prémio Internacional de Rio Maior em Marcha Atlética in (Portugal) Rio Maior
  - 20 km winners: (Colombia) Éider Arévalo (m) / (China) Qieyang Shenjie (f)
- April 20 & 21: IAAF Race Walking Challenge and Pan American 50 km Race Walking Cup in (Mexico) Lázaro Cárdenas, Michoacán
  - 10 km (U20) winners: (Mexico) Cesar Córdoba Fernandez (m) / (Ecuador) Glenda Morejón (f)
  - 20 km winners: (Sweden) Perseus Karlström (m) / (Brazil) Érica de Sena (f)
  - 50 km winners: (Mexico) Isaac Palma (m) / (Peru) Evelyn Inga (f)
- May 11 & 12: 2019 IAAF Race Walking Challenge in (China) Taicang
  - 20 km winners: (China) Wang Kaihua (m) / (China) Qieyang Shenjie (f)
- May 19: 2019 European Race Walking Cup in (Lithuania) Alytus
  - 20 km winners: (Sweden) Perseus Karlström (m) / (Lithuania) Živilė Vaiciukevičiūtė (f)
  - 50 km winners: (France) Yohann Diniz (m) / (Italy) Eleonora Giorgi (f)
- June 8: Gran Premio Cantones de La Coruña in (Spain) A Coruña
  - 20 km winners: (Japan) Toshikazu Yamanashi (m) / (Ecuador) Glenda Morejón (f)
- June 26: Oceania Race Walking Championships (10 km) in (Australia) Townsville
  - 10,000 m winners: (Australia) Rhydian Cowley (m) / (Australia) Jemima Montag (f)
- September 27 – October 6: Part of the 2019 World Championships in Athletics in (Qatar) Doha
  - 20 km winners: (Japan) Toshikazu Yamanishi (m) / (China) Liu Hong (f)
  - 50 km winners: (Japan) Yusuke Suzuki (m) / (China) Liang Rui (f)
- October 20–22: Around Taihu International Race Walking 2019 (final) in (China) Suzhou
  - 20 km winners: (Sweden) Perseus Karlström (m) / (Brazil) Érica de Sena (f)

=== 2019 IAAF Road Race Label Events (Gold) ===
- January 6: Xiamen International Marathon in China
  - Winners: (Ethiopia) Dejene Debela (m) / (Ethiopia) Medina Deme Armino (f)
- January 20: Houston Half Marathon in the United States
  - Winners: (Ethiopia) Shura Kitata Tola (m) / (Kenya) Brigid Kosgei (f)
- January 20: Mumbai Marathon in India
  - Winners: (Kenya) Cosmas Lagat (m) / (Ethiopia) Worknesh Alemu (f)
- January 25: Dubai Marathon in the United Arab Emirates
  - Winners: (Ethiopia) Getaneh Molla (m) / (Kenya) Ruth Chepngetich (f)
- January 27: Osaka International Ladies Marathon in Japan (women only)
  - Winner: (Ethiopia) Fatuma Sado
- February 10: eDreams Mitja Marató de Barcelona in Spain
  - Winners: (Kenya) Eric Kiptanui (m) / (Ethiopia) Roza Dereje (f)
- February 17: Hong Kong Marathon in Hong Kong
  - Winners: (Kenya) Barnabas Kiptum (m) / (Belarus) Volha Mazuronak (f)
- February 17: Seville Marathon in Spain
  - Winners: (Ethiopia) Ayana Tsedat (m) / (Ethiopia) Guteni Shone (f)
- February 24: Medio Maratón Internacional Electrolit Guadalajara in Mexico
  - Winners: (Kenya) Mathew Kisorio (m) / (Ethiopia) Afera Godfay Berha (f)
- March 10: Lake Biwa Marathon in Japan (men only)
  - Winner: (Morocco) Salah Eddine Bounasr
- March 10: Roma-Ostia Half Marathon in Italy
  - Winners: (Ethiopia) Guye Adola (m) / (Israel) Lonah Chemtai Salpeter (f)
- March 10: Nagoya Women's Marathon in Japan (women only)
  - Winner: (Namibia) Helalia Johannes
- March 17: Lisbon Half Marathon in Portugal
  - Winners: (Ethiopia) Mosinet Geremew (m) / (Kenya) Vivian Cheruiyot (f)
- March 17: Seoul International Marathon in South Korea
  - Winners: (Kenya) Thomas Kiplagat Rono (m) / (Bahrain) Desi Jisa Mokonin (f)
- March 31: Chongqing International Marathon in China
  - Winners: (Ethiopia) Jimma Shambel (m) / (Ethiopia) Aberu Mekuria (f)
- April 6: Prague Half Marathon in the Czech Republic
  - Winners: (Kenya) Bernard Kimeli (m) / (Kenya) Caroline Chepkoech Kipkirui (f)
- April 7: Istanbul Half Marathon in Turkey
  - Winners: (Kenya) Benard Ngeno (m) / (Kenya) Ruth Chepngetich (f)
- April 7: Rotterdam Marathon in the Netherlands
  - Winners: (Kenya) Marius Kipserem (m) / (Ethiopia) Ashete Bekere (f)
- April 7: Vienna City Marathon in Austria
  - Winners: (Kenya) Vincent Kipchumba (m) / (Kenya) Nancy Kiprop (f)
- April 14: Paris Marathon in France
  - Winners: (Ethiopia) Abrha Milaw (m) / (Ethiopia) Gelete Burka (f)
- April 20: Yellow River Estuary International Marathon in China
  - Winners: (Kenya) Felix Kimutai (m) / (Ethiopia) Afera Godfay (f)
- April 21: Yangzhou Jianzhen International Half Marathon in China
  - Winners: (Ethiopia) Berehanu Tsegu (m) / (Kenya) Perine Nengampi (f)
- April 27: Madrid Marathon in Spain
  - Winners: (Kenya) Reuben Kerio (m) / (Ethiopia) Shaso Insermu (f)
- April 28: Gifu Seiryu Half Marathon in Japan
  - Winners: (Kenya) Amos Kurgat (m) / (Kenya) Ruth Chepngetich (f)
- May 5: Prague Marathon in the Czech Republic
  - Winners: (Morocco) Almahjoub Dazza (m) / (Israel) Lonah Chemtai Salpeter (f)
- May 19: World 10K Bangalore in India
  - Winners: (Ethiopia) Andamlak Belihu (m) / (Kenya) Agnes Jebet Tirop (f)
- May 19: Riga Marathon in Latvia
  - Winners: (Ethiopia) Andualem Belay (m) / (Ethiopia) Beyene Debele (f)
- May 25 & 26: Ottawa Race Weekend in Canada
  - 10 km winners: (Morocco) Mohammed Ziani (m) / (Kenya) Dorcas Kimeli (f)
  - Marathon winners: (Kenya) Albert Korir (m) / (Ethiopia) Tigist Girma (f)
- June 2: Lanzhou International Marathon in China
  - Winners: (Kenya) Justus Kimutai (m) / (Ethiopia) Worknesh Edesa (f)
- July 7: Gold Coast Marathon in Australia
  - Winners: (Japan) Yuta Shitara (m) / (Kenya) Rodah Chepkorir Tanui (f)
- July 28: Bogotá Half Marathon in Colombia
  - Winners: (Ethiopia) Tamirat Tola (m) / (Kenya) Ruth Chepngetich (f)
- August 25: Mexico City Marathon in Mexico
  - Winners: (Kenya) Duncan Maiyo (m) / (Kenya) Vivian Kiplagat (f)
- September 7: Prague Grand Prix in the Czech Republic
  - Winners: (Kenya) Geoffrey Koech (m) / (Kenya) Sheila Chepkirui (f)
- September 8: Taiyuan International Marathon in China
  - Winners: (Bahrain) Marius Kimutai (m) / (Ethiopia) Belainesh Yami Gurmu (f)
- September 15: Sydney Marathon in Australia
  - Winners: (Kenya) Felix Kiprotich (m) / (Kenya) Stellah Barsosio (f)
- September 15: Copenhagen Half Marathon in Denmark
  - Winners: (Kenya) Geoffrey Kipsang Kamworor (m) / (Ethiopia) Birhane Dibaba (f)
- September 15: Cape Town Marathon in South Africa
  - Winners: (Kenya) Edwin Koech (m) / (Kenya) Celestine Chepchirchir (f)
- September 21: Ústí nad Labem Half Marathon in the Czech Republic
  - Winners: (Germany) Hendrik Pfeiffer (m) / (United Kingdom) Jess Piasecki (f)
- September 22: Hengshui Lake International Marathon in China
  - Winners: (Ethiopia) Aychew Bantie (m) / (Ethiopia) Marta Lema Megra (f)
- October 20: Amsterdam Marathon in the Netherlands
  - Winners: (Kenya) Vincent Kipchumba (m) / (Ethiopia) Degitu Azmeraw (f)
- October 20: Luso Meia Maratona in Portugal
  - Winners: (Kenya) Titus Ekiru (m) / (Kenya) Peres Jepchirchir (f)
- October 20: Delhi Half Marathon in India
  - Winners: (Ethiopia) Andamlak Belihu (m) / (Ethiopia) Tsehay Gemechu (f)
- October 20: Toronto Waterfront Marathon in Canada
  - Winners: (Kenya) Philemon Rono (m) / (Kenya) Magdelyne Masai (f)
- October 27: Frankfurt Marathon in Germany
  - Winners: (Ethiopia) Fikre Tefera (m) / (Kenya) Valary Aiyabei (f)
- October 27: Ljubljana Marathon in Slovenia
  - Winners: (Ethiopia) Kelkile Gezahegn (m) / (Kenya) Bornes Chepkirui Kitur (f)
- October 27: Valencia Half Marathon in Spain
  - Winners: (Ethiopia) Yomif Kejelcha (m) / (Ethiopia) Senbere Teferi (f)
- November 3: Istanbul Marathon in Turkey
  - Winners: (Kenya) Daniel Kipkore Kibet (m) / (Ethiopia) Hirut Tibebu (f)
- November 3: Hangzhou International Marathon in China
  - Winners: (Bahrain) Marius Kimutai (m) / (Kenya) Agnes Barsosio (f)
- November 3: Beijing Marathon in China
  - Winners: (Kenya) Mathew Kisorio (m) / (Ethiopia) Sutume Asefa (f)
- November 17: Shanghai Marathon in China
  - Winners: (Kenya) Paul Lonyangata (m) / (Ethiopia) Yebrgual Melese (f)
- November 30: Singapore Marathon in Singapore
  - Winners: (Kenya) Joshua Kipkorir (m) / (Kenya) Priscah Cherono (f)
- December 1: Valencia Marathon in Spain
  - Winners: (Ethiopia) Kinde Atanaw (ETH) (m) / (Ethiopia) Roza Dereje (f)
- December 1: Fukuoka Marathon in Japan
  - Winners: (Morocco) El Mahjoub Dazza
- December 8: Guangzhou Marathon in China
  - Winners: (Ethiopia) Gebretsadik Abraha (m) / (Ethiopia) Hiwot Gebrekidan Gebremarya (f)
- December 15: Shenzhen Marathon in China
  - Winners: (Ethiopia) Tadese Tola Woldegeberel (m) / (Ethiopia) Belainesh Yami Gurmu (f)
- December 31: San Silvestre Vallecana in (Spain) Madrid

=== 2019 IAAF Road Race Label Events (Silver) ===
- January 20: Houston Marathon in the United States
  - Winners: (Kenya) Albert Korir (m) / (Ethiopia) Biruktayit Degefa (f)
- February 3: Kagawa Marugame Half Marathon in Japan
  - Winners: (Netherlands) Abdi Nageeye (m) / (Kenya) Betsy Saina (f)
- March 17: New Taipei City Wan Jin Shi Marathon in Chinese Taipei
  - Winners: (Kenya) Mathew Kipsaat (m) / (Kenya) Naomi Jepkogei Maiyo (f)
- March 31: PZU Warsaw Half Marathon in Poland
  - Winners: (Kenya) Gilbert Masai (m) / (Kenya) Gladys Kipkoech (f)
- April 7: Daegu Marathon in South Korea
  - Winners: (Kenya) Felix Kipchirchir (m) / (Kenya) Pamela Rotich (f)
- April 7: Hanover Marathon in Germany
  - Winners: (Kenya) Silas Mwetich (m) / (Kenya) Racheal Mutgaa (f)
- April 7: Milano City Marathon in Italy
  - Winners: (Kenya) Titus Ekiru (m) / (Kenya) Vivian Jerono Kiplagat (f)
- April 7: Rome Marathon in Italy
  - Winners: (Ethiopia) Tebalu Zawude (m) / (Ethiopia) Megertu Alemu (f)
- April 14: Orlen Warsaw Marathon in Poland
  - Winners: (Ethiopia) Regasa Mindaye (m) / (Kenya) Sheila Jerotich (f)
- May 12: Dalian International Marathon in China
  - Winners: (Ethiopia) Tsegaye Getachew (m) / (Ethiopia) Mulu Seboka (f)
- May 25: Okpekpe Intn'l 10 km Road Race in Nigeria
  - Winners: (Bahrain) Dawit Fikadu (m) / (Kenya) Sheila Chelangat (f)
- September 15: Minsk Half Marathon in Belarus
  - Winners: (Ethiopia) Berhane Afewerki (m) / (Belarus) Nina Savina (f)
- September 22: Dam tot Damloop in the Netherlands
  - Winners: (Ethiopia) Solomon Berihu (m) / (Kenya) Evaline Chirchir (f)
- October 6: Cardiff Half Marathon in Great Britain
  - Winners: (Kenya) Leonard Langat (m) / (Kenya) Lucy Cheruiyot (f)
- October 6: Košice Peace Marathon in Slovakia
  - Winners: (Kenya) Hillary Kipsambu Kibiwott (m) / (Ethiopia) Kumeshi Sichala (f)
- October 13: 20 Kilomètres de Paris in France
  - Winners: (Kenya) Enos Kales (m) / (Kenya) Naomi Jebet (f)
- October 20: Lisbon Marathon in Portugal
  - Winners: (Ethiopia) Andualem Shiferaw (m) / (Ethiopia) Sechale Dalasa (f)
- November 10: Hefei International Marathon in China
  - Winners: (Ethiopia) Yihunilign Adana Amsalu (m) / (Ethiopia) Ftaw Zeray Bezabh (f)
- December 1: 10K Valencia Trinidad Alfonso in Spain
  - Winners: (Uganda) Joshua Cheptegei (m) / (Sudan) Linn Monica Nilsson (f)
- December 8: Saitama International Marathon in Japan
  - Winners: (Kenya) Peres Jepchirchir
- December 15: Bangsaen21 Half Marathon in (Thailand) Chonburi Province
  - Winners: (Ethiopia) Sisay Lemma Kasaye (m) / (Bahrain) Shitaye Eshete Habtegebrel (f)
- December 15: Tata Steel Kolkata 25K in India
  - Winners: (Kenya) Leonard Barsoton (m) / (Ethiopia) Guteni Shone (f)
- December 29: Corrida de Houilles in France

=== 2019 IAAF Road Race Label Events (Bronze) ===
- January 13: 10k Valencia Ibercaja in Spain
  - Winners: (Ethiopia) Chala Ketema Regasa (m) / (Ethiopia) Tsehay Gemechu (f)
- February 2: Lagos City Marathon in Nigeria
  - Winners: (Ethiopia) Sintayehu Legese (m) / (Ethiopia) Dinke Meseret (f)
- March 10: Barcelona Marathon in Spain
  - Winners: (Bahrain) Alemu Bekele (m) / (Ethiopia) Kuftu Tahir (f)
- March 17: Gdynia Half Marathon in Poland
  - Winners: (Norway) Sondre Nordstad Moen (m) / (Ethiopia) Genet Gashie (f)
- March 24: Beverly Wuxi Marathon in China
  - Winners: (Ethiopia) Asnake Dubre Negawo (m) / (Ethiopia) Tsehay Gebre Getiso (f)
- April 7: Kyiv Half Marathon in Ukraine
  - Winners: (Kenya) Bernard Sang (m) / (Kenya) Daisy Kimeli (f)
- April 7: Madrid Half Marathon in Spain
  - Winners: (Kenya) Kipkemoi Kiprono (m) / (Ethiopia) Tigist Teshome (f)
- April 7: Pyongyang Marathon in North Korea
  - Winners: (North Korea) RI Kang-bom (m) / (North Korea) RI Kwang-ok (f)
- April 7: Maratona de São Paulo in Brazil
  - Winners: (Kenya) Pharis Kimani (m) / (Ethiopia) Sifan Melaku (f)
- April 14: Dongfeng Renault Wuhan Marathon in China
  - Winners: (Kenya) Andrew Ben Kimutai (m) / (Ethiopia) Fantu Jimma (f)
- April 21: Nagano Olympic Commemorative Marathon in Japan
  - Winners: (Uganda) Jackson Kiprop (m) / (Ethiopia) Meskerem Hunde (f)
- April 28: Cracovia Marathon in Poland
  - Winners: (Kenya) Cyprian Kimurgor Kotut (m) / (Ukraine) Viktoriya Khapilina (f)
- May 12: Geneva Marathon in Switzerland
  - Winners: (Kenya) Bernard Too (m) / (Kenya) Josephine Chepkoech (f)
- May 19: Copenhagen Marathon in Denmark
  - Winners: (Kenya) Jackson Limo (m) / (Ethiopia) Etalemahu Habtewold (f)
- May 19: Cape Town Marathon in South Africa
  - Winners: (Kenya) Morris Gachanga (m) / (Kenya) Brillian Kipkoech (f)
- May 19: Happy 10K Guangzhou in China
  - Winners: (Bahrain) Dawit Fikadu Admasu (m) / (Kenya) Sandrafelis Chebet Tuei (f)
- June 8: 15K Nocturna Valencia Banco Mediolanum in Spain
  - Winners: (Kenya) Abel Kipchumba (m) / (Ethiopia) Zeineba Yimer (f)
- June 15: Corrida de Langueux in France
  - Winners: (Kenya) Emmanuel Bor (m) / (Ethiopia) Tesfaye Nigsti Haftu (f)
- June 22: Vidovdanska Trka 10 km in Bosnia and Herzegovina
  - Winners: (Eritrea) Afewerki Berhane (m) / (Poland) Karolina Jarzyńska (f)
- June 29: Le 10 km de Port-Gentil in Gabon
  - Winners: (Uganda) Abdallah Mande (m) / (Kenya) Sheila Chelangat (f)
- July 28: Liupanshui Summer International Marathon in China
  - Winners: (Kenya) Robert Kipkemboi (m) / (Bahrain) Eunice Chumba (f)
- August 4: Sunshine Coast Half Marathon in Australia
  - Winners: (Republic of Ireland) Kevin Batt (m) / (Australia) Lisa Jane Weightman (f)
- September 22: Porto Half Marathon in Portugal
  - Men's winners (tie): (Uganda) Maxwell Kortek Rotich & (Ethiopia) Enyew Mekonnen Alem
  - Women's winner: (Kenya) Antonina Kwambai
- September 22: Buenos Aires Marathon in Argentina
  - Winners: (Kenya) Evans Chebet (m) / (Kenya) Rodah Tanui (f)
- September 29: 20 km International de Marrakesh in Morocco
  - Winners: (Morocco) Hamza Lemqartesse (m) / (Morocco) Fatiha Asmid (f)
- October 6: Amgen Singelloop Breda in the Netherlands
  - Winners: (Eritrea) Berhane Tesfay (m) / (Kenya) Naom Jebet (f)
- October 13: Bucharest Marathon in Romania
  - Winners: (Romania) Hosea Kipkemboi (m) / (Kenya) Sophia Chesir (f)
- October 13: Wizz Air Sofia Marathon in Bulgaria
  - Winners: (Kenya) Hosea Tuei (m) / (Ethiopia) Hayelom Shegae (f)
- October 13: Changzhou West Taihu Lake Half Marathon in China
  - Winners: (Ethiopia) Taye Girma (m) / (Ethiopia) Fantu Jimma (f)
- October 13: FNB Durban 10K CITYSURFRUN in South Africa
  - Winners: (South Africa) Stephen Mokoka (m) / (Kenya) Sheila Chepkirui (f)
- October 20: PKO Poznań Marathon in Poland
  - Winners: (Kenya) Cosmas Kyeva (m) / (Poland) Monica Stefanowicz (f)
- October 27: Changsha International Marathon in China
  - Winners: (Ethiopia) Abdi Kebede (m) / (Ethiopia) Tigist Teshome (f)
- October 27: Venice Marathon in Italy
  - Winners: (Ethiopia) Tesfaye Lencho Anbesa (m) / (Kenya) Judith Korir (f)
- November 1: La Corsa dei Santi 10 km in Italy
  - Winners: (Kenya) James Mburugu (m) / (Ukraine) Sofia Yaremchuk (f)
- November 3: Porto Marathon in Portugal
  - Winners: (Ethiopia) Deso Gelmisa (m) / (Ethiopia) Bontu Bekele Gada (f)
- November 3: Maratón Internacional Megacable Guadalajara in Mexico
  - Winners: (Kenya) Kiprotich Kirui (m) / (Ethiopia) Mamitu Daska Molisa (f)
- November 9: Xichang Qionghai Lake Wetland International Marathon in China
  - Winners: (Ethiopia) Shume Tafa (m) / (Ethiopia) Aberash Demisse Korsa (f)
- November 10: Nanjing Marathon in China
  - Winners: (Kenya) Stephen Kiplimo (m) / (Ethiopia) Melkam Gizaw Tola (f)
- November 10: Nanchang International Marathon in China
  - Winners: (Kenya) Moses Kiptoo Kurgat (m) / (Mongolia) Bayartsogt Munkhzaya (f)
- November 17: Kobe Marathon in Japan
  - Winners: (Uganda) Geofret Kusuro (m) / (Japan) Haruka Yamaguchi (f)
- November 17: Boulogne-Billancourt Half Marathon in France
  - Winners: (Kenya) Felix Kipkoec (m) / (Kenya) Nancy Jelagat Meto (f)
- November 24: Florence Marathon in Italy
  - Winners: (Ethiopia) Nigussie Bekele Sahlesilassie (m) / (United Kingdom) Jess Piasecki (f)
- December 1: Marathon COMAR de la ville de Tunis in Tunisia
  - Winners: (Kenya) Bernard Sang (m) / (Kenya) Pauline Wangui (f)
- December 1: SCO Kunming International Marathon in China
  - Winners: (Ethiopia) Dereje Debele Tulu (m) / (Ethiopia) Mulu Seboka Seyfu (f)
- December 1: GSEZ Marathon du Gabon in Libreville
  - Winners: (Kenya) Alex Bartilol (m) / (Kenya) Leah Jerotich (f)
- December 15: Taipei Marathon in Chinese Taipei
  - Winners: (Kenya) Kenneth Mburu Mungara (m) / (Kenya) Antonina Kwambai (f)
- December 15: Zurich Maratón Málaga in Spain
  - Winners: (Kenya) Martin Cheruiyot (m) / (Ethiopia) Selamawit Getnet Tsegaw (f)
- December 31: Saint Silvester Road Race in (Brazil) São Paulo
- December 31: BOclassic in (Italy) Bolzano

=== EA Major Competitions ===
- February 3: 2019 ECCC Cross Country in (Portugal) Albufeira
  - Individual winners: (Uganda) Jacob Kiplimo (m) / (Kenya) Fancy Cherono (f)
  - Junior individual winners: (Kenya) Edward Zakayo (m) / (Turkey) Emine Akbingöl (f)
  - Team winners: (Spain) Atletismo Bikila (m) / (Portugal) Sporting CP (f)
  - Junior Team winners (Turkey) Darıca Belediyesi (m) / (Turkey) Fenerbahçe (f)
- March 1–3: 2019 European Athletics Indoor Championships in (United Kingdom) Glasgow
  - 60 m winners: (Slovakia) Ján Volko (m) / (Poland) Ewa Swoboda (f)
  - 400 m winners: (Norway) Karsten Warholm (m) / (Switzerland) Léa Sprunger (f)
  - 800 m winners: (Spain) Álvaro de Arriba (m) / (United Kingdom) Shelayna Oskan-Clarke (f)
  - 1,500 m winners: (Poland) Marcin Lewandowski (m) / (United Kingdom) Laura Muir (f)
  - 3,000 m winners: (Norway) Jakob Ingebrigtsen (m) / (United Kingdom) Laura Muir (f)
  - 60 m Hirdles winners: (Cyprus) Milan Trajkovic (m) / (Netherlands) Nadine Visser (f)
  - High Jump winners: (Italy) Gianmarco Tamberi (m) / (Authorised Neutral Athletes) Mariya Lasitskene (f)
  - Pole Vault winners: (Poland) Paweł Wojciechowski (m) / (Authorised Neutral Athletes) Anzhelika Sidorova (f)
  - Long Jump winners: (Greece) Miltiádis Tentóglou (m) / (Serbia) Ivana Španović (f)
  - Triple Jump winners: (Azerbaijan) Nazim Babayev (m) / (Spain) Ana Peleteiro (f)
  - Shot Put winners: (Poland) Michał Haratyk (m) / (Bulgaria) Radoslava Mavrodieva (f)
  - 4 × 400 m winners: Belgium (Julien Watrin, Dylan Borlée, Jonathan Borlée, Kevin Borlée) (m) / Poland (Anna Kiełbasińska, Iga Baumgart-Witan, Małgorzata Hołub-Kowalik, Justyna Święty-Ersetic) (f)
  - Men's Heptathlon winner: (Spain) Jorge Ureña
  - Women's Pentathlon winner: (United Kingdom) Katarina Johnson-Thompson
- March 9 & 10: 2019 European Throwing Cup in (Slovakia) Šamorín
  - Shot Put winners: (Portugal) Francisco Belo (m) / (Sweden) Fanny Roos (f)
  - U23 Shot Put winners: (Georgia (country)) Giorgi Mujaridze (m) / (Netherlands) Jorinde van Klinken (f)
  - Discus Throw winners: (Belgium) Philip Milanov (m) / (Germany) Shanice Craft (f)
  - U23 Discus Throw winners: (Slovenia) Kristjan Čeh (m) / (Croatia) Marija Tolj (f)
  - Javelin Throw winners: (Slovenia) Matija Kranjc (m) / (Belarus) Tatsiana Khaladovich (f)
  - U23 Javelin Throw winners: (Belarus) Aliaksei Katkavets (m) / (Italy) Sara Žabarino (f)
  - Hammer Throw winners: (France) Quentin Bigot (m) / (Belarus) Hanna Malyshchyk (f)
  - U23 Hammer Throw winners: (Ukraine) Mykhaylo Kokhan (m) / (Russia) Sofiya Palkina (f)
  - Teams winners: Poland (4246 p.) (m) / Germany (4276 p.) (f)
  - U23 Teams winners: Belarus (4363 p.) (m) / Ukraine (3648 p.) (f)
- May 25 & 26: 2019 ECCC Track and Field seniors— Group A in (Spain) Castellón
  - Winners: (Spain) Club Atletismo Playas de Castellón (m) (122 p.) / (Turkey) Enka SK (f) (133 p.)
- May 25: 2019 ECCC Track and Field seniors — Group B in (Finland) Tampere
  - Winners: (Belgium) RESC (m) (151 p.) / (Slovenia) Atletsko društvo Mass Ljubljana (f) (136 p.)
- July 6: 2019 European 10,000m Cup in (United Kingdom) London
- July 7: 2019 European Mountain Running Championships in (Switzerland) Zermatt
- July 11–14: 2019 European Athletics U23 Championships in (Sweden) Gävle
- July 18–21: 2019 European Athletics U20 Championships in (Sweden) Borås
- August 9–11: 2019 European Team Championships — Super League in (Poland) Bydgoszcz
- August 9–11: 2019 European Team Championships — First League in (Norway) Sandnes
- August 10 & 11: 2019 European Team Championships — Second League in (Croatia) Varaždin
- August 10 & 11: 2019 European Team Championships — Third League in (North Macedonia) Skopje
- September 9 & 10: Europe – United States match in (Belarus) Minsk
- September 21: 2019 ECCC Track and Field U20 — Group A in TBD
- September 21: 2019 ECCC Track and Field U20 — Group B in (Portugal) Leiria
- December 8: 2019 European Cross Country Championships in (Portugal) Lisbon

=== ABAF competitions ===
- February 10: Balkan U20 Indoor Championships in (Turkey) Istanbul
  - 60 m winners: (Bulgaria) Vesselin Jivkov (m) / (Israel) Eden Finkelstein (f)
  - 400 m winners: (Ukraine) Yaroslav Demchenko (m) / (Ukraine) Mariana Shostak (f)
  - 800 m winners: (Slovenia) Jan Vukovič (m) / (Turkey) Tugba Toptaş (f)
  - 1,500 m winners: (Ukraine) Andrii Krakovetskyi (m) / (Turkey) Inci Kalkan (f)
  - 3,000 m winners: (Turkey) Ayetullah Aslanhan (m) / (Turkey) Urkış Işık (f)
  - 60 m Hurdles winners: (Slovenia) Filip Jakob Demšar (m) / (Ukraine) Krystyna Yurchuk (f)
  - Long Jump winners: (Ukraine) Andriy Avramenko (m) / (Israel) Eden Finkelstein (f)
  - Triple Jump winners: (Serbia) Dimitrije Novakovic (m) / (Greece) Spyridoula Karydi (f)
  - High Jump winners: (Ukraine) Oleh Doroshchuk (m) / (Turkey) Rümeysa Öktem (f)
  - Pole Vault winners: (Ukraine) Artur Bortnikov (m) / (Turkey) Mesure Tutku Yilmaz (f)
  - Shot Put winners: (Turkey) Alperen Karahan (m) / (Turkey) Pinar Akyol (f)
  - 4 × 400 m winners: Croatia (m) / Croatia (f)
- February 16: 2019 Balkan Athletics Indoor Championships in (Turkey) Istanbul
  - 60 m winners: (Turkey) Emre Zafer Barnes (m) / (Israel) Diana Vaisman (f)
  - 400 m winners: (Turkey) Yavuz Can (m) / (Cyprus) Eleni Artymata (f)
  - 800 m winners: (Ukraine) Yevhen Hutsol (m) / (Slovenia) Jerneja Smonkar (f)
  - 1,500 m winners: (Serbia) Elzan Bibić (m) / (Serbia) Amela Terzić (f)
  - 3,000 m winners: (Bulgaria) Mitko Tsenov (m) / (Albania) Luiza Gega (f)
  - 60 m Hurdles winners: (Turkey) Mikdat Sevler (m) / (Turkey) Şevval Ayaz (f)
  - Long Jump winners: (Romania) Gabriel Bitan (m) / (Ukraine) Maryna Bekh (f)
  - Triple Jump winners: (Armenia) Levon Aghasyan (m) / (Ukraine) Anna Krasutska (f)
  - High Jump winners: (Bulgaria) Tihomir Ivanov (m) / (Romania) Daniela Stanciu (f)
  - Pole Vault winners: (Israel) Lev Skorish (m) / (Greece) Eleni Pollak (f)
  - Shot Put winners: (Bosnia and Herzegovina) Mesud Pezer (m) / (Bulgaria) Radoslava Mavrodieva (f)
  - 4 × 400 m winners: Croatia (Mateo Parlov, David Salamon, Gabrijel Stojanović, Mateo Ružić) (m) / Ukraine (Kateryna Klymiuk, Tetyana Melnyk, Anastasiia Bryzgina, Hanna Ryzhykova) (f)
- April 7: 2019 Balkan Half Marathon Championships in (Ukraine) Kyiv
  - Winners: (Ukraine) Roman Romanenko (m) / (Ukraine) Dariya Mikhaylova (f)
  - Team winners: Turkey
- April 20: 2019 Balkan Race Walking Championships in (Greece) Alexandroupolis
  - 20 km winners: (Greece) Alexandros Papamichail (m) / (Greece) Panayiota Tsinopoulou (f)
  - U20 10 km winners: (Turkey) Selman Ilhan (m) / (Turkey) Evin Demir (f)
  - U18 10 km winners: (Turkey) Mustafa Tekdal (m) / (Turkey) Songül Koçer (f)
- May 18: 2019 Balkan Mountain Running Championships in (Romania) Câmpulung Moldovenesc
  - Senior 12 km winners: (Turkey) Yüksel Gültekin (m) / (Slovenia) Mojca Koligar (f)
  - U20 6 km winners: (Turkey) Matur Yusuf (m) / (Turkey) Öner Mihriban (f)
  - U20 6 km Team winners: Turkey (m) / Turkey (f)
  - Teams winners: Turkey (m) / Turkey (Eylem Gur, Mert Elif, Gülsün Tunc, Gulen Gul Betul) (f)
- June 22: Balkan 10k Road Race in (Bosnia and Herzegovina) Brčko
  - Winners: (Eritrea) Afewerki Berhane (m) / (Poland) Karolina Jarzyńska (f)
- July 2 & 3: 2019 Balkan U20 Championships in (Romania) Cluj-Napoca
- July 13: 2019 Balkan U18 Championships in (Serbia) Kraljevo
- July 24 & 25: Balkan Relays in (Turkey) Erzurum
- September 2 & 3: 2019 Balkan Athletics Championships in (Bulgaria) Pravets
- November 3: 2019 Balkan Marathon Championships in (Serbia) Belgrade
- November 9: 2019 Balkan Cross Country Championships in (Montenegro) Berane

=== 2018–2019 EA Cross Country Permit Races ===
- September 29, 2018: #1 (TCS Lidingoloppet) in (Sweden) Lidingö
  - Winners: (Sweden) Napoleon Solomon (m) / (Kenya) Sylvia Mmboga Medugu (f)
- November 18, 2018: #2 (Cross de l'Acier) in (France) Leffrinckoucke
  - Winners: (Ethiopia) Berihu Solomon (m) / (Ethiopia) Letesenbet Gidey (f)
- November 24, 2018: #3 (Skanderborg Cross) in (Denmark) Skanderborg
  - Winners: (Denmark) Magnus Nyman Hall (m) / (Denmark) Anna Emilie Møller (f)
- November 25, 2018: #4 (Darmstadt Cross) in (Germany) Darmstadt
  - Winners: (Germany) Samuel Fitwi Sibhatu (m) / (Germany) Elena Burkard (f)
- November 25, 2018: #5 (International Warandecross) in (Netherlands) Tilburg
  - Winners: (Netherlands) Michel Butter (m) / (Netherlands) Susan Krumins (f)
- December 2, 2018: #6 (Cross Internacional de la Constitución) in (Spain) Aranda de Duero
  - Winners: (Ethiopia) Tigist Gashaw (m) / (Spain) Gema Martín Borgas (f)
- January 6: #7 (Cross Zornotza) in (Spain) Amorebieta-Etxano
  - Winners: (Kenya) Stanley Waithaka (m) / (Ethiopia) Trihas Gebre (f)
- January 12: #8 (Great Stirling Run) in (United Kingdom) Stirling
  - Winners: (United States) Hillary Bor (m) / (Germany) Elena Burkard (f)
- January 20: #9 (Abdijcross) in (Netherlands) Kerkrade
  - Winners: (Germany) Samuel Fitwi Sibhatu (m) / (Germany) Anna Gehring (f)
- January 20: #10 (Cross della Vallagarina) in (Italy) Rovereto
  - Winners: (Ethiopia) Telahun Haile Bekele (m) / (Czech Republic) Moira Stewartová (f)
- January 20: #11 (Lotto Cross Cup) Hannut in (Belgium) Hannut (final)
  - Winners: (Uganda) Thomas Ayeko (m) / (Poland) Anna Gosk (f)

=== EA Indoor Permit Meetings ===
- January 27: Meeting de Paris in (France) Paris
  - 60 m winners: (Ivory Coast) Arthur Cissé (m) / (France) Orlann Ombissa-Dzangue (f)
  - 60 m Hurdles winners: (Spain) Orlando Ortega (m) / (Croatia) Andrea Ivančević (f)
  - Men's Pole Vault winner: (United States) Sam Kendricks
  - Men's Triple Jump winner: (Burkina Faso) Hugues Fabrice Zango
- February 1: Meeting de l'Eure in (France) Val-de-Reuil
  - 60 m winners: (United States) Mike Rodgers (m) / (Belarus) Krystsina Tsimanouskaya (f)
  - Women's 200 m winner: (France) Anne Maquet
  - Men's 400 m winner: (France) Muhammad Abdalla Kounta
  - 800 m winners: (Kenya) Cornelius Tuwei (m) / (Ethiopia) Diribe Welteji (f)
  - Men's 1,500 m winner: (France) Samir Dahmani
  - 60 m Hurdles winners: (Spain) Orlando Ortega (m) / (United States) Evonne Britton (f)
  - High Jump winners: (Russia) Ilya Ivanyuk (m) / (Greece) Tatiána Goúsin (f)
  - Men's Triple Jump winner: (Finland) Simo Lipsanen
- February 2 & 3: European Athletics Permit Meeting Combined Events in (Estonia) Tallinn
  - Men's Heptathlon winner: (Estonia) Janek Õiglane
  - Women's Pentathlon winner: (Latvia) Laura Ikauniece-Admidiņa
- February 3: Reykjavik International Games in Reykjavík
  - 60 m winners: (United States) Marcellus Moore (m) / (United Kingdom) Finette Agyapong (f)
  - 400 m winners: (United States) Ashton Allen (m) / (Iceland) Thórdís Eva Steinsdóttir (f)
  - 800 m winners: (Iceland) Sæmundur Ólafsson (m) (m) / (United Kingdom) Shelayna Oskan-Clarke (f)
  - Men's 1,500 m winner: (Iceland) Hlynur Andrésson
  - High Jump winners: (Iceland) Benjamín Jóhann Johnsen (m) / (Sweden) Ellen Huldén (f)
  - Long Jump winners: (United Kingdom) James Lelliott (m) / (Iceland) Hafdís Sigurdardóttir (f)
  - Shot Put winners: (United Kingdom) Scott Lincoln (m) / (Iceland) Irma Gunnarsdóttir (f)
  - 4 × 200 m winners: United States (Marcellus Moore, Malcolm Johnson, Mordecai McDaniel, Ashton Allen) (m) / Iceland (Melkorka Rán Hafliðadóttir, Gudbjörg Jóna Bjarnadóttir, Glódís Edda Þuríðardóttir) (f)
- February 4: Orlen Cup 2019 in (Poland) Łódź
  - 60 m winners: (United States) Mike Rodgers (m) / (Poland) Ewa Swoboda (f)
  - 60 m Hurdles winners: (Spain) Orlando Ortega (m) / (United States) Evonne Britton (f)
  - Men's High Jump winner: (Poland) Sylwester Bednarek (m)
  - Men's Pole Vault winner: (Poland) Piotr Lisek
  - Shot Put winners: (Poland) Konrad Bukowiecki (m) / (Belarus) Aliona Dubitskaya (f)
- February 4: Folksam GP Indoor Stockholm in (Sweden) Stockholm
  - 60 m winners: (United Kingdom) Confidence Lawson (m) / (Sweden) Iréne Ekelund (f)
  - Women's 400 m winner: (Latvia) Gunta Vaičule
  - 800 m winners: (Sweden) Andreas Kramer (m) / (Belgium) Renée Eykens (f)
  - Women's 1,500 winner: (Czech Republic) Simona Vrzalová
  - Men's 3000 m winner: (Australia) Stewart McSweyn
  - Women's 60 m Hurdles winner: (Hungary) Gréta Kerekes
  - Women's Pole Vault winner: (Sweden) Angelica Bengtsson
  - Men's High Jump winner: (The Bahamas) Jamal Wilson
  - Long Jump winners: (Sweden) Andreas Otterling (m) / (Sweden) Khaddi Sagnia (f)
  - Shot Put winners: (Bosnia and Herzegovina) Mesud Pezer (m) / (Sweden) Fanny Roos (f)
- February 9: Gugl Indoor Meeting in (Austria) Linz
  - 60 m winners: (United States) D'Angelo Cherry (m) / (Austria) Alexandra Toth (f)
  - 400 m winners: (Netherlands) Tony van Diepen (m) / (Hungary) Evelin Nádházy (f)
  - Women's 60 m Hurdles winner: (Croatia) Ivana Lončarek
  - Women's 1,500 m winner: (Slovenia) Maruša Mišmaš
  - Men's 3,000 m winner: (Netherlands) Mike Foppen
  - Men's Pole Vault winner: (Latvia) Mareks Ārents
  - Men's Triple Jump winner: (Poland) Adrian Świderski
  - Women's Long Jump winner: (Hungary) Anasztázia Nguyen
- February 9: IFAM Meeting in (Belgium) Ghent
  - 60 m winners: (Japan) Takuya Kawakami (m) / (Netherlands) Marije van Hunenstijn (f)
  - 400 m winners: (Latvia) Austris Karpinskis (m) / (Belgium) Camille Laus (f)
  - 800 m winners: (Belgium) Aaron Botterman (m) / (Italy) Elena Bellò (f)
  - 1,500 m winners: (Denmark) Nick Jensen (m) / (Netherlands) Elsbeth Ciesluk (f)
  - Men's 3,000 m winner: (Iceland) Hlynur Andrésson
  - 60 m Hurdles winners: (Belgium) Michael Obasuyi (m) / (Netherlands) Nadine Visser (f)
  - Men's High Jump winner: (The Bahamas) Jamal Wilson
  - Pole Vault winners: (China) Zhang Wei (m) / (China) Li Ling (f)
  - Men's Long Jump winners: (Cuba) Geovany Paz
- February 9: Banskobystrická latka 2019 in (Slovakia) Banská Bystrica
  - High Jump winners: (Japan) Naoto Tobe (m) / (Russia) Mariya Lasitskene (f)
- February 10: International Indoor Meeting de Liévin in (France) Liévin
  - 60 m winners: (Ivory Coast) Arthur Cissé (m) / (Ivory Coast) Marie-Josée Ta Lou (f)
  - 400 m winners: (Belgium) Kevin Borlée (m) / (Poland) Iga Baumgart-Witan (f)
  - 800 m winners: (Poland) Marcin Lewandowski (m) / (Ethiopia) Habitam Alemu (f)
  - Women's 1,000 m winner: (Ethiopia) Genzebe Dibaba
  - Men's 1,500 m winner: (Ethiopia) Samuel Tefera
  - Men's 2,000 m winner: (Bahrain) Birhanu Balew
  - 60 m Hurdles winners: (France) Pascal Martinot-Lagarde (m) / (Belarus) Elvira Herman (f)
  - Pole Vault winners: (United States) Sam Kendricks (m) / (United States) Katie Nageotte (f)
  - Men's Triple Jump winner: (Burkina Faso) Hugues Fabrice Zango
- February 10: Meeting Metz Moselle Athlélor in (France) Metz
  - 60 m winners: (Turkey) Emre Zafer Barnes (m) / (Switzerland) Mujinga Kambundji (f)
  - Men's 200 m winner: (Colombia) Bernardo Baloyes
  - Women's 300 m winner: (Switzerland) Léa Sprunger
  - 800 m winners: (France) Clément Dhainaut (m) / (Sweden) Lovisa Lindh (f)
  - Men's 1,500 m winner: (Algeria) Abderrahmane Anou
  - Men's 3,000 m winner: (Australia) Stewart McSweyn
  - 60 m Hurdles winners: (United States) Jarret Eaton (m) / (Finland) Nooralotta Neziri (f)
  - Women's Long Jump winner: (Belarus) Nastassia Mironchyk-Ivanova
  - Men's Triple Jump winner: (Azerbaijan) Nazim Babayev
- February 12: Czech Indoor Gala in Ostrava
  - 60 m winners: (United States) Mike Rodgers (m) / (Bulgaria) Inna Eftimova (f)
  - 300 m winners: (Czech Republic) Pavel Maslák (m) / (Latvia) Gunta Vaičule (f)
  - 800 m winners: (Bosnia and Herzegovina) Amel Tuka (m) / (Slovakia) Alexandra Štuková (f)
  - Women's 1,500 m winner: (Poland) Sofia Ennaoui
  - Women's High Jump winner: (Ukraine) Yuliya Chumachenko
  - Women's Pole Vault winner: (Czech Republic) Amálie Švábíková
  - Long Jump winners: (Japan) Shontaro Shiroyama (m) / (Hungary) Anasztázia Nguyen (f)
  - Men's Shot Put winner: (Canada) Tim Nedow
  - Women's 4 × 400 m winners: Czech Republic (Lada Vondrová, Tereza Petržilková, Marcela Pírková, Martina Hofmanová)
- February 13: AIT Grand Prix 2019 in (Republic of Ireland) Athlone
  - 60 m winners: (China) Su Bingtian (m) / (Jamaica) Gayon Evans (f)
  - 400 m winners: (Netherlands) Tony van Diepen (m) / (United Kingdom) Meghan Beesley (f)
  - 800 m winners: (Republic of Ireland) Mark English (m) / (Republic of Ireland) Claire Mooney (f)
  - 1,500 m winners: (Poland) Marcin Lewandowski (m) / (Republic of Ireland) Ciara Mageean (f)
  - Men's 60 m Hurdles winner: (United Kingdom) David King
  - Men's Pole Vault winner: (Finland) Tommi Holttinen
  - Men's Long Jump winner: (Republic of Ireland) Donal Kearns
  - Women's High Jump winner: (Greece) Tatiána Goúsin
- February 17: Istanbul Indoor Cup in (Turkey) Istanbul
  - 60 m winners: (United States) D'Angelo Cherry (m) / (Bulgaria) Inna Eftimova (f)
  - 400 m winners: (Ukraine) Vitaliy Butrym (m) / (Ukraine) Tetyana Melnyk (f)
  - 60 m Hurdles winners: (Belarus) Vitali Parakhonka (m) / (Romania) Anamaria Nesteriuc (f)
  - Women's 1,500 m winner: (Serbia) Amela Terzić
  - Men's 3,000 m winner: (Serbia) Elzan Bibić
  - Men's Long Jump winner: (Turkey) Muammer Demir
  - Men's High Jump winner: (Turkey) Alperen Acet
  - Shot Put winners: (Portugal) Francisco Belo (m) / (Turkey) Emel Dereli (f)
- February 20: Serbian Open Indoor Meeting in (Serbia) Belgrade
  - 60 m winners: (Turkey) Aykut Ay (m) / (Serbia) Milana Tirnanić (f)
  - 400 m winners: (Bosnia and Herzegovina) Amel Tuka (m) / (Slovenia) Anita Horvat (f)
  - 1,500 m winners: (Serbia) Elzan Bibić (m) / (Serbia) Amela Terzić (f)
  - 60 m Hurdles winners: (Serbia) Luka Trgovčević (m) / (Croatia) Ivana Lončarek (f)
  - Long Jump winners: (Serbia) Strahinja Jovančević (m) / (Serbia) Ivana Španović (f)
  - Men's High Jump winner: (Serbia) Jasmin Halili
  - Men's Shot Put winner: (Bosnia and Herzegovina) Mesud Pezer
- February 24: All Star Perche in (France) Clermont-Ferrand (final)
  - Pole Vault winners: (Poland) Piotr Lisek (m) / (Sweden) Angelica Bengtsson (f)

=== EA Race Walking Permit Meetings ===
- March 23: Dudinská Päťdesiatka in (Slovakia) Dudince
  - 20 km winners: (Lithuania) Arturas Mastianica (m) / (Colombia) Sandra Galvis (f)
  - 50 km winners: (Norway) Håvard Haukenes (m) / (Slovakia) Mária Czaková (f)
  - U20 10 km winners: (Mexico) Carlos Mercenario Jr. (m) / (Slovakia) Hana Burzalová (f)
  - Men's U18 10 km winner: (Hungary) Máté Ferenc Varga
- April 6: Podebrady Walking in (Czech Republic) Poděbrady
  - 5 km winners: (Germany) Steffen Borsch (m) / (Germany) Bianca Schenker (f)
  - 20 km winners: (Authorised Neutral Athletes) Vasiliy Mizinov (m) / (Italy) Eleonora Anna Giorgi (f)
  - U20 10 km winners: (Mexico) César Córdova Fernández (m) / (Mexico) Karla Serrano (f)
  - U18 10 km winners: (Slovakia) Patrik Nemčok (m) / (Germany) Mathilde Frenzl (f)
- April 13: Naumburg Race Walking in (Germany) Naumburg (final)
  - 20 km winners: (Germany) Nils Brembach (m) / (France) Marine Quennehen (f)
  - U23 20 km winners: (Germany) Leo Köpp (m) / (Germany) Saskia Feige (f)
  - Women's U18 winner: (Germany) Mathilde Frenzl

=== EA Outdoor Classic Meetings ===
- June 3: Memoriál Josefa Odložila in (Czech Republic) Prague
  - Men's 100 m winner: (Ivory Coast) Arthur Cissé
  - Men's 400 m winner: (Botswana) Baboloki Thebe
  - Women's 800 m winner: (Morocco) Malika Akkaoui
  - Men's 1,500 m winner: (Kenya) Hillary Ngetich
  - Women's 100 m Hurdles winner: (Nigeria) Oluwatobiloba Amusan
  - 400 m Hurdles winners: (Algeria) Abdelmalik Lahoulou (m) / (Czech Republic) Zuzana Hejnová (f)
  - Men's Pole Vault winner: (France) Axel Chapelle
  - Men's Javelin Throw winner: (Czech Republic) Jakub Vadlejch
  - Women's High Jump winner: (Croatia) Ana Šimić
  - Men's Long Jump winner: (Czech Republic) Radek Juška
  - Men's Shot Put winner: (United States) Joe Kovacs
- June 4: Clean Air Games in Oslo
  - Women's 200 m winner: (Trinidad and Tobago) Semoy Hackett
  - Men's 300 m winner: (United States) Michael Berry
  - 800 m winners: (Slovenia) Žan Rudolf (m) / (Italy) Irene Baldessari (f)
  - Men's 110 m Hurdles winner: (Netherlands) Koen Smet
  - Women's 100 m Hurdles winner: (United States) Jade Barber
  - 400 m Hurdles winners: (United States) Johnny Dutch (m) / (United States) Kaila Barber (f)
  - Men's Long Jump winner: (Germany) Julian Howard
  - Discus Throw winners: (Jamaica) Traves Smikle (m) / (United States) Vanessa Kamga (f)
  - Hammer Throw winners: (Hungary) Bence Halász (m) / (Sweden) Ida Storm (f)
  - Pole Vault winners: (Norway) Eirik G. Dolve (m) / (Norway) * Birgitte Kjuus (f)
  - Men's Shot Put winner: (Norway) Martin Roe
  - 4 × 100 m winners: United States (m) / Norway (f)
- June 9: Venizelia – Chania in (Greece) Chania
  - 100 m winners: (United Kingdom) Richard Kilty (m) / (Jamaica) Remona Burchell (f)
  - 400 m winners: (United States) Kyle Clemons (m) / (Greece) Maria Belimpasaki (f)
  - 800 m winners: (Hungary) Balázs Vindics (m) / (Ukraine) Olha Lyakhova (f)
  - Women's 100 m Hurdles winner: (Greece) Elisavet Pesiridou
  - Long Jump winners: (Greece) Miltiadis Tentoglou (m) / (United States) Quanesha Burks (f)
  - Men's Hammer Throw winner: (United Kingdom) Nick Miller
  - Women's Javelin Throw winner: (Czech Republic) Irena Šedivá
  - Men's Shot Put winner: (Authorised Neutral Athletes) Maksim Afonin
- June 11: Meeting de Montreuil in France
  - 100 m winners: (Japan) Yuki Koike (m) / (France) Carolle Zahi (f)
  - 400 m winners: (United States) Vernon Norwood (m) / (Botswana) Christine Botlogetswe (f)
  - 800 m winners: (Kenya) Collins Kipruto (m) / (United Kingdom) Laura Muir (f)
  - Men's 110 m Hurdles winner: (France) Wilhem Belocian
  - Women's 100 m Hurdles winner: (United States) Kendell Williams
  - Men's 400 m Hurdles winner: (Algeria) Abdelmalik Lahoulou
  - Men's 1500 m winner: (Uganda) Ronald Musagala
  - Women's 2000 m winner: (South Africa) Caster Semenya
  - Men's Triple Jump winner: (United States) Christian Taylor
  - Women's Hammer Throw winner: (Moldova) Zalina Petrivskaya
- June 11–12: Irena Szewinska Memorial in (Poland) Bydgoszcz
  - 100 m winners: (South Africa) Simon Magakwe (m) / (United States) Morolake Akinosun (f)
  - 400 m winners: (Bahrain) Abbas Abubakar Abbas (m) / (Niger) Aminatou Seyni (f)
  - Women's U20 400 m winner: (Poland) Susane Lächele
  - 800 m winners: (Poland) Adam Kszczot (m) / (Ethiopia) Frewoni Hailu (f)
  - Men's 110 m Hurdles winner: (Poland) Damian Czykier
  - Women's 100 m Hurdles winner: (Italy) Luminosa Bogliolo
  - Men's 3000 m Steeplechase winner: (Kenya) Barnabas Kipyego
  - Women's Long Jump winner: (Hungary) Anasztázia Nguyen
  - Men's Triple Jump winner: (Poland) Adrian Świderski
  - Men's Hammer Throw winner: (Poland) Wojciech Nowicki
  - Men's Pole Vault winner: (Poland) Paweł Wojciechowski
  - Men's Shot Put winner: (Poland) Michał Haratyk
- June 15: AtletiCAGenève in (Switzerland) Geneva
  - Note: Due to heavy thunderstorm, the meet had to be stopped at around 16h45. The following events did not finish: Men's High Jump, Men's 100 m (only 1 heat), Men's 110 m Hurdles (only heats), Women's Pole Vault, Women's 100 m Hurdles (only heats).
  - Note: The following events have been canceled: Men's 200 m, Women's Triple Jump, Women's 200 m, Mixed 4 × 400 m.
  - Women's 100 m winner: (Switzerland) Ajla Del Ponte
  - 400 m winners: (Italy) Davide Re (m) / (France) Déborah Sananes (f)
  - Women's 800 m winner: (United Kingdom) Mari Smith
  - Men's 1500 m winner: (Lithuania) Simas Bertašius
  - 400 m Hurdles winners: (United Kingdom) Sebastian Rodger (m) / (Netherlands) Femke Bol (f)
  - High Jump winners: (Germany) Jossie Graumann (f)
  - Long Jump winners: (Italy) Filippo Randazzo (m) / (China) LU Minja (f)
  - Women's Discus Throw winner: (United Kingdom) Amy Holder
  - Men's Javeline Throw winner: (Hungary) Norbert Rivasz-Tóth
  - Men's Pole Vault winner: (United Kingdom) Charlie Myers
  - 4 × 100 m winners: Netherlands (Chris Garia, Churandy Martina, Hensley Paulina, Taymir Burnet) (m) / Netherlands (Eefje Boons, Marije van Hunenstijn, Madiea Ghafoor, Naomi Sedney) (f)
- June 15: P-T-S Meeting in (Slovakia) Šamorín
  - Men's 100 m winner: (United States) Christopher Belcher
  - Women's 400 m winner: (Greece) Maria Belimpasaki
  - Women's 800 m winner: (Ethiopia) Freweyni Hailu
  - Women's 100 m Hurdles winner: (Ukraine) Hanna Plotitsyna
  - 400 m Hurdles winners: (United States) Johnny Dutch (m) / (United States) Kiah Seymour (f)
  - Men's 1000 m winner: (Djibouti) Ayanleh Souleiman
  - Women's 3000 m Race Walk winner: (Slovakia) Mária Czaková
  - Men's 3000 m steeplechase winner: (Ethiopia) Tafese Soboka
  - Men's High Jump winner: (Syria) Majededdin Ghazal
  - Women's Long Jump winner: (United States) Kendell Williams
  - Men's Triple Jump winner: (United States) Christian Taylor
  - Men's Javelin Throw winner: (Poland) Cyprian Mrzygłód
- June 16: 65. Janusz Kusociński Memorial in (Poland) Chorzów
  - 100 m winners: (United States) Mike Rodgers (m) / (Poland) Ewa Swoboda (f)
  - 400 m winners: (Bahrain) Abbas Abubakar Abbas (m) / (United States) Dalilah Muhammad (f)
  - Men's 800 m winner: (Kenya) Alfred Kipketer
  - Women's 1500 m winner: (Belarus) Daryia Barysevich
  - Women's 100 m Hurdles winner: (Poland) Karolina Kołeczek
  - Men's 110 m Hurdles winner: (Cuba) Roger Iribarne
  - Women's High Jump winner: (Authorised Neutral Athletes) Mariya Lasitskene
  - Men's Long Jump winner: (Poland) Tomasz Jaszczuk
  - Hammer Throw winners: (Poland) Paweł Fajdek (m) / (United States) Gwen Berry (f)
  - Men's Pole Vault winner: (United States) Sam Kendricks
  - Shot Put winners: (New Zealand) Tom Walsh (m) / (Belarus) Aliona Dubitskaya (f)
- June 18: Copenhagen Athletics Games in (Denmark) Copenhagen
  - 100 m winners: (Zambia) Sydney Siame (m) / (United Kingdom) Rachel Miller (f)
  - Men's 400 m winner: (United States) Michael Berry
  - Women's 1500 m winners: (Kenya) Evans Kipchumba (m) / (Denmark) Anna Emilie Møller (f)
  - Men's 3000 m steeplechase winner: (South Africa) Rantso Mokopane
  - Men's 110 m Hurdles winner: (Brazil) João Vítor de Oliveira
  - Women's 100 m Hurdles winner: (United States) Jade Barber
  - 400 m Hurdles winners: (United States) Johnny Dutch (m) / (Czech Republic) Zuzana Hejnová (f)
  - Men's Long Jump winner: (India) Sreeshankar Murali
  - Women's Triple Jump winner: (Dominica) Thea LaFond
  - Discus Throw winners: (Norway) Ola Stunes Isene (m) / (Germany) Kristin Pudenz (f)
- June 18: Sollentuna GP in (Sweden) Sollentuna
  - 100 m winners: (United States) Christopher Belcher (m) / (Canada) Crystal Emmanuel (f)
  - 400 m winners: (United Kingdom) Rabah Yousif (m) / (United Kingdom) Emily Diamond (f)
  - 800 m winners: (Tunisia) Abdessalem Ayouni (m) / (Sweden) Lovisa Lindh (f)
  - 1500 m winners: (Sweden) Andreas Almgren (m) / (India) P. U. Chitra (f)
  - Men's 3000 m steeplechase winner: (Australia) Ben Buckingham
  - 5000 m winners: (Norway) Narve Gilje Nordås (m) / (Sweden) Samrawit Mengsteab (f)
  - Women's 100 m Hurdles winner: (United States) Evonne Britton
  - Men's 400 m Hurdles winner: (The Bahamas) Jeffery Gibson
  - High Jump winners: (Chinese Taipei) Hsiang Chun-hsien (m) / (Australia) Nicola McDermott (f)
  - Men's Long Jump winner: (Belarus) Uladzilau Bulakhau
  - Women's Javelin Throw winner: (Chinese Taipei) Li Hui-jun
  - Men's Discus Throw winner: (Sweden) Daniel Ståhl
  - Women's Pole Vault winner: (Sweden) Angelica Bengtsson
- June 21: Meeting Iberoamericano de Atletismo in (Spain) Huelva
  - 400 m winners: (Colombia) Anthony Zambrano (m) / (Cuba) Roxana Gómez (f)
  - Men's 800 m winner: (Spain) Álvaro de Arriba
  - 400 m Hurdles winners: (Argentina) Guillermo Ruggeri (m) / (Cuba) Zurian Hechavarría (f)
  - 1500 m winners: (Spain) Adel Mechaal (m) / (Uganda) Esther Chebet (f)
  - 3000 m steeplechase winners: (Eritrea) Yemane Haileselassie (m) / (Kenya) Daisy Jepkemei (f)
  - Men's 5000 m winner: (Ethiopia) Tades Worku
  - Women's 5000 m Race Walk winner: (Spain) Laura García-Caro
  - Women's Discus Throw winner: (Cuba) Denia Caballero
  - Men's Hammer Throw winner: (Greece) Mihail Anastasakis
  - Women's Triple Jump winner: (Venezuela) Yulimar Rojas
- June 22: Kuortane Meeting in (Finland) Kuortane
  - Men's 100 m winner: (United Kingdom) Samuel Osewa
  - Women's 200 m winner: (Sierra Leone) Maggie Barrie
  - Men's 800 m winner: (Finland) Joonas Rinne
  - Women's 1500 m winner: (Finland) Sara Kuivisto
  - Men's 3000 m Steeplechase winner: (Morocco) Mohamed Tindouft
  - Men's 110 m Hurdles winner: (United Kingdom) David King
  - Women's 100 m Hurdles winner: (Poland) Karolina Kołeczek
  - Women's 400 m Hurdles winner: (United States) Kiah Seymour
  - Women's High Jump winner: (Croatia) Ana Šimić
  - Men's Triple Jump winner: (United Kingdom) Nathan Douglas
  - Men's Hammer Throw winner: (United Kingdom) Nick Miller
  - Javelin Throw winners: (Estonia) Magnus Kirt (m) / (China) Liu Shiying (f)
  - Women's Pole Vault winner: (United Kingdom) Holly Bradshaw
- June 22: Meeting Stanislas in (France) Nancy
  - 100 m winners: (United States) Bryce Robinson (m) / (France) Orlann Ombissa-Dzangue (f)
  - Women's 400 m winner: (Niger) Aminatou Seyni
  - 800 m winners: (Kenya) Alfred Kipketer (m) / (Uganda) Winnie Nanyondo (f)
  - Men's 1500 m winner: (Uganda) Ronald Musagala
  - Men's 110 m Hurdles winner: (France) Wilhem Belocian
  - Women's 100 m Hurdles winner: (Italy) Luminosa Bogliolo
  - Men's Long Jump winner: (France) Yann Randrianasolo
  - Men's Discus Throw winner: (Poland) Robert Urbanek
  - Men's Hammer Throw winner: (Poland) Paweł Fajdek
  - Women's Pole Vault winner: (China) Xu Huiqin
- June 22: Soundtrack Meeting in (Germany) Tübingen
  - Meeting cancelled
- June 30: Résisprint in (Switzerland) La Chaux-de-Fonds
  - 100 m winners: (Antigua and Barbuda) Cejhae Greene (m) / (South Africa) Tebogo Mamatu (f)
  - 200 m winners: (Switzerland) Alex Wilson (m) / (Netherlands) Lieke Klaver (f)
  - 400 m winners: (Colombia) Anthony Zambrano (m) / (United Kingdom) Jodie Williams (f)
  - 800 m winners: (Italy) Enrico Parigi (m) / (Lesotho) Tsepang Sello (f)
  - Men's 110 m Hurdles winner: (Brazil) Eduardo de Deus
  - Women's 100 m Hurdles winner: (Italy) Luminosa Bogliolo
  - 400 m Hurdles winners: (Brazil) Alison Santos (m) / (Jamaica) Nikita Tracey (f)
  - Women's Pole Vault winner: (Switzerland) Nicole Büchler
  - Triple Jump winners: (China) Zhu Yaming (m) / (Lithuania) Diana Zagainova (f)
  - Long Jump winners: (China) Zhang Yaoguang (m) / (Brazil) Eliane Martins (f)
  - High Jump winners: (Switzerland) Vivien Streit (m) / (Switzerland) Salome Lang (f)
  - Javelin Throw winners: (South Africa) Phil-Mar van Rensburg (m) / (Switzerland) Caroline Agnou (f)
- July 2: Meeting de Marseille in (France) Marseille
  - Men's 100 m winner: (France) Jimmy Vicaut
  - Women's 200 m winner: (United Kingdom) Ashleigh Nelson
  - Men's 400 m winner: (United States) Tyrell Richard
  - 800 m winners: (Morocco) Mostafa Smaili (m) / (Kenya) Nelly Jepkosgei (f)
  - 1500 m winners: (United Kingdom) Charlie Grice (m) / (Ethiopia) Tigist Ketema (f)
  - Women's 100 m Hurdles winner: (France) Solène Ndama
  - Women's 400 m Hurdles winner: (United States) Sydney McLaughlin
  - Men's High Jump winner: (Puerto Rico) Luis Castro
  - Women's Long Jump winner: (United States) Kate Hall
  - Men's Javelin Throw winner: (Poland) Cyprian Mrzygłód
- July 3: Karlstad GP in (Sweden) Karlstad
  - 100 m winners: (Antigua and Barbuda) Cejhae Greene (m) / (Jamaica) Natalliah Whyte (f)
  - Men's 200 m winner: (United Kingdom) Delano Williams
  - 800 m winners: (Australia) Peter Bol (m) / (Norway) Hedda Hynne (f)
  - Men's 1500 m winner: (Kenya) Vincent Keter
  - Men's 110 m Hurdles winner: (Sweden) Max Hrelja
  - Women's 100 m Hurdles winner: (Sweden) Maja Rogemyr
  - 400 m Hurdles winners: (Sweden) Isak Andersson (m) / (Sweden) Minna Svärd (f)
  - High Jump winners: (Japan) Naoto Hasegawa (m) / (Montenegro) Marija Vuković (f)
  - Pole Vault winners: (Sweden) Melker Svärd Jacobsson (m) / (Ukraine) Maryna Kylypko (f)
  - Long Jump winners: (Sweden) Andreas Carlsson (m) / (Sweden) Tilde Johansson (f)
  - Shot Put winners: (United Kingdom) Scott Lincoln (m) / (Canada) Brittany Crew
  - Men's Discus Throw winner: (Sweden) Daniel Ståhl
  - Men's Javelin Throw winner: (Germany) Thomas Röhler
- July 16: Meeting Città di Padova in (Italy) Padua
  - 100 m winners: (Italy) Marcell Jacobs (m) / (Jamaica) Shelly-Ann Fraser-Pryce (f)
  - Men's 200 m winner: (Brazil) Aldemir da Silva Júnior
  - 400 m winners: (Nigeria) Emmanuele Bamidele (m) / (United States) Phyllis Francis (f)
  - Women's 800 m winner: (Kenya) Eunice Sum
  - Men's 110 m hurdles winner: (United States) Freddie Crittenden
  - Women's 100 m Hurdles winner: (The Bahamas) Pedrya Seymour
  - Men's 400 m Hurdles winner: (United States) Byron Robinson
  - Women's High Jump winner: (Authorised Neutral Athletes) Mariya Lasitskene
  - Men's Long Jump winner: (United States) Trumaine Jefferson
  - Women's Triple Jump winner: (Venezuela) Yulimar Rojas
  - Men's Pole Vault winner: (Philippines) Ernest Obiena
  - Men's Shot Put winner: (Jamaica) O'Dayne Richards
- July 16: Meeting International de Sotteville-lès-Rouen in (France) Sotteville-lès-Rouen
  - 100 m winners: (Ivory Coast) Arthur Cissé (m) / (South Africa) Carina Horn (f)
  - Men's 200 m winner: (France) Christophe Lemaitre
  - Women's 400 m winner: (United Kingdom) Laviai Nielsen
  - Men's 800 m winner: (Kenya) Alfred Kipketer
  - Women's 1500 m winner: (Kenya) Quailyne Kiprop
  - Men's 3000 m winner: (Morocco) Abdalaati Iguider
  - Men's 110 m Hurdles winner: (Kuwait) Yaqoub Al-Youha
  - Women's 100 m Hurdles winner: (Nigeria) Tobi Amusan
  - Men's High Jump winner: (Bulgaria) Tihomir Ivanov
  - Men's Triple Jump winner: (Brazil) Alexsandro Melo
  - Women's Discus Throw winner: (Cuba) Yaimé Pérez
  - Women's Javelin Throw winner: (Poland) Maria Andrejczyk
  - Women's Pole Vault winner: (Cuba) Yarisley Silva
- July 17: Meeting International de Liège in (Belgium) Liège
  - 100 m winners: (Antigua and Barbuda) Cejhae Greene (m) / (Trinidad and Tobago) Michelle-Lee Ahye (f)
  - Men's 300 m winner: (South Africa) Clarence Munyai
  - 400 m winners: (Qatar) Femi Ogunode (m) / (Barbados) Tia-Adana Belle (f)
  - 800 m winners: (South Africa) Tshepo Tshite (m) / (Kenya) Emily Cherotich Tuei (f)
  - 1500 m winners: (Japan) Kazuto Iizawa (m) / (Israel) Selamawit Dagnachew (f)
  - 400 m Hurdles winners: (France) Mamadou Kassé Hanne (m) / (Jamaica) Ristananna Tracey (f)
  - 3000m Steeplechase winners: (Kenya) Wilberforce Kones (m) / (Canada) Geneviève Lalonde (f)
  - Men's 110 m Hurdles winner: (Barbados) Shane Brathwaite
  - Women's 100 m Hurdles winner: (Belgium) Anne Zagré
  - Women's High Jump winner: (Saint Lucia) Levern Spencer
  - Women's Long Jump winner: (Hungary) Anasztázia Nguyen
  - Men's Pole Vault winner: (Netherlands) Rutger Koppelaar
- July 20: KBC Night of Athletics in (Belgium) Heusden-Zolder
- July 24: Joensuu Meeting in (Finland) Joensuu
- August 16: Gothenburg Athletic GP in (Sweden) Gothenburg
- September 1: Galà dei Castelli in (Switzerland) Bellinzona
- September 4: Meeting Guadalajara in (Spain) Guadalajara
- September 6: Meeting de Andújar in (Spain) Andújar
- September 14: Kamila Skolimowska Memorial Meeting in (Poland) Chorzów

=== EA Area Permit Meetings ===
- January 6: Cross Zornotza in (Spain) Amorebieta-Etxano
  - Winners: (Kenya) Stanley Waithaka (m) / (Ethiopia) Trihas Gebre (f)
- January 26: Just Pole Vault in (Sweden) Stockholm
  - Winners: (Norway) Pål Haugen Lillefosse (m) / (Sweden) Angelica Bengtsson (f)
- January 27: Cross de San Sebastián) in (Spain) San Sebastián
  - Winners: (Bahrain) Hassan Chani (m) / (Spain) Irene Sánchez-Escribano (f)
- February 2 & 3: Combined event in (Sweden) Uppsala
  - Men's Decathlon winner: (Sweden) Fredrik Samuelsson
  - Women's Heptatlon winner: (Sweden) Tilde Johansson
- February 2: International Indoor Meeting in Luxembourg City
  - 50 m winners: (South Africa) Gerrit Wickens (m) / (Luxembourg) Patrizia van der Weken (f)
  - 60 m winners: (South Africa) Gerrit Wickens (m) / (Luxembourg) Patrizia van der Weken (f)
  - 400 m winners: (Netherlands) Tony van Diepen (m) / (Germany) Nadine Gonska (f)
  - 800 m winners: (France) Renaud Rosiere (m) / (Czech Republic) Renata Vocásková (f)
  - 1,500 m winners: (Algeria) Abderrahmane Anou (m) / (Luxembourg) Charline Mathias (f)
  - Women's 60 m Hurdles winner: (France) Pauline Lett
  - Men's Long Jump winner: (France) Augustin Bey
  - Women's Triple Jump winner: (Portugal) Susana Costa
  - Men Shot Put winner: (Luxembourg) Bob Bertemes
- February 10: 10 km Donostia Gimnastica de Ulia in (Spain) San Sebastián
  - Winners: (Spain) David Palacio (m) / (Spain) Gema Martín Borgas (f)
- March 1–3: RM Winterthrow in (Sweden) Gothenburg
  - Shot Put winners: (Sweden) Gabriel Heen (m) / (Sweden) Maria Nilsson (f)
  - Discus Throw winners: (Sweden) Theodor Walther (m) / (Sweden) Emma Ljungberg (f)
  - Hammer Throw winners: (Sweden) Tim Söderqvist (m) / (Sweden) Tracey Andersson (f)
  - Javelin Throw winners: (Sweden) Sebastian Thörngren (m) / (Estonia) Mari Klaup (f)
- March 30: XVII Media Marathon Azkoitiapeitia Memorial Diego Garcia in (Spain) Azpeitia
  - Winners: (Kenya) Emmanuel Bett (m) / (Sweden) Meraf Bahta (f)
- April 6: XIV Milla Internacional de Bilbao in (Spain) Bilbao
  - Winners: (Morocco) Brahim Elasri (m) / (Spain) Iris Fuentes-Pila (f)
- April 20: Trophy of Montenegro in Bar
  - No full result found
- May 1: Caucasus Cup in (Georgia (country)) Tbilisi
  - No full result found
- May 26: International IX Meeting of Castiglione in (Italy) Castiglione della Pescaia
  - 100 m winners: (Italy) Marcell Jacobs (m) / (Italy) Irene Siragusa (f)
  - Men's 200 m winner: (Canada) Brendon Rodney
  - Women's 400 m winner: (Cyprus) Eleni Artymata
  - 800 m winners: (Bosnia and Herzegovina) Amel Tuka (m) / (Italy) Elena Bellò (f)
  - 3,000 m winners: (Uganda) Oscar Chelimo (m) / (Italy) Martina Merlo (f)
  - Men's 3,000 m Steeplechase winner: (Kenya) Hosea Kimeli Kisorio
- May 26: #13 Meeting Elite de Forbach in (France) Forbach
  - 100 m winners: (Nigeria) Usheoritse Itsekiri (m) / (France) Marie-Ange Rimlinger (f)
  - 400 m winners: (Republic of the Congo) Gilles Anthony Afoumba (m) / (Niger) Aminatou Seyni (f)
  - 800 m winners: (South Africa) Tshepo Tshite (m) / (Benin) Souliath Saka (f)
  - Men's 110 m Hurdles winner: (France) Dimitri Bascou
  - Men's High Jump winner: (Mexico) Edgar Rivera
  - Men's Pole Vault winner: (France) Alioune Sene
  - Women's 100 m Hurdles winner: (France) Fanny Quenot
  - Triple Jump winners: (Burkina Faso) Hugues Fabrice Zango (m) / (Israel) Hanna Knyazyeva-Minenko
  - Hammer Throw winners: (Poland) Pawel Fajdek (m) / (Poland) Joanna Fiodorow
  - Men's Shot Put winner: (Poland) Michał Haratyk
- May 29: 8th Meeting International Citta di Savona in (Italy) Savona
  - 100 m winners: (Italy) Marcell Jacobs (m) / (United Kingdom) Kristal Awuah (f)
  - 200 m winners: (Canada) Brendon Rodney (m) / (United Kingdom) Georgina Adam (f)
  - 400 m winners: (United States) Michael Berry (m) / (United Kingdom) Zoey Clark (f)
  - Men's 800 m winner: (United Kingdom) Abedin Mujezinović
  - Men's 110 m Hurdles winner: (Italy) Lorenzo Perini
  - Women's 100 m Hurdles winner: (Italy) Luminosa Bogliolo
  - Men's Long Jump winner: (Italy) Filippo Randazzo
  - Men's Triple Jump winner: (Italy) Tobia Bocchi
  - Javelin Throw winners: (Italy) Mauro Fraresso (m) / (Italy) Zahra Bani (f)
  - Men's Shot Put winner: (South Africa) Orazio Cremona
- May 29: International Military T&F Championship – 19th E. Listos Memorial in (Poland) Wrocław
  - 100 m winners: (Poland) Remigiusz Olszewski (m) / (Poland) Katarzyna Sokólska (f)
  - 200 m winners: (Poland) Patryk Wykrota (m) / (Poland) Anna Kiełbasińska (f)
  - 400 m winners: (Poland) Przemysław Waściński (m) / (Poland) Anna Dobek (f)
  - 800 m winners: (Poland) Michał Rozmys (m) / (Poland) Natalia Gulczyńska (f)
  - 1,500 m winners: (Poland) Patryk Kozłowski (m) / (Poland) Paulina Kaczyńska (f)
  - 5,000 m winners: (Poland) Robert Głowala (m) / (Poland) Izabela Trzaskalska (f)
  - Men's 110 m Hurdles winner: (United Kingdom) Miguel Perera
  - Men's 300 m Hurdles winner: (Poland) Patryk Dobek
  - Women's 400 m Hurdles winner: (Poland) Joanna Linkiewicz
  - 3000 m steeplechase winners: (Ukraine) Roman Rostykus (m) / (Poland) Patrycja Kapała (f)
  - Men's High Jump winner: (Poland) Norbert Kobielski
  - Pole Vault winners: (Poland) Tomasz Bialic (m) / (Poland) Anna Łyko (f)
  - Men's Long Jump winner: (Poland) Mateusz Jopek
  - Men's Triple Jump winner: (Poland) Adrian Świderski
  - Shot Put winners: (Poland) Jakub Szyszkowski (m) / (Poland) Paulina Guba (f)
  - Men's Discus Throw winner: (Poland) Piotr Małachowski
  - Javelin Throw winners: (Poland) Marcin Krukowski (m) / (Poland) Julia Chuda (f)
- June 15–16: Baltic Team Championships/ President's Cup in (Latvia) Riga
  - 100 m winners: (Belarus) Stanislau Darahakupets (m) / (Lithuania) Akvilė Andriukaitytė (f)
  - 200 m winners: (Lithuania) Gediminas Truskauskas (m) / (Lithuania) Akvilė Andriukaitytė (f)
  - 400 m winners: (Latvia) Austris Karpinskis (m) / (Belarus) Katsiaryna Kharashkevich (f)
  - 800 m winners: (Lithuania) Benediktas Mickus (m) / (Lithuania) Monika Elenska (f)
  - 1500 m winners: (Estonia) Kaur Kivistik (m) / (Lithuania) Monika Elenska (f)
  - 5000 m winners: (Lithuania) Egidijus Adomkaitis (m) / (Lithuania) Monika Bytautienė (f)
  - 3000 m steeplechase winners: (Lithuania) Justinas Beržanskis (m) / (Estonia) Saina Mamedova (f)
  - Women's 5000 m winner: (Estonia) Jekaterina Mirotvortseva
  - Men's 10000 m winner: (Belarus) Uladzimir Kalesnik
  - 4 × 100 m winners: Belarus (Stanislau Darahakupets, Maksim Hrabarenka, Pavel Dyrda, Yuriy Zabolotnyy (m) / Lithuania (Karolina Deliautaitė, Augustė Regalaitė, Akvilė Andriukaitytė, Ugnė Jankauskaitė) (f)
  - 4 × 400 m winners: Estonia (Karl Erik Nazarov, Marek Niit, Rivar Tipp, Erik Jagor) (m) / Estonia (Annika Sakkarias, Helin Meier, Piibe Kirke Aljas, Liis Roose) (f)
  - Men's 110 m Hurdles winner: (Belarus) Vitali Parakhonka
  - Women's 100 m Hurdles winner: (Estonia) Grit Šadeiko
  - 400 m Hurdles winners: (Estonia) Erik Jagor (m) / (Lithuania) Gabija Galvydytė (f)
  - Long Jump winners: (Estonia) Hans-Christian Hausenberg (m) / (Estonia) Kreete Verlin (f)
  - Triple Jump winners: (Belarus) Maksim Niastsiarenka (m) / (Lithuania) Dovilė Dzindzaletaitė (f)
  - High Jump winners: (Lithuania) Adrijus Glebauskas (m) / (Latvia) Laura Ikauniece-Admidiņa (f)
  - Pole Vault winners: (Lithuania) Mareks Ārents (m) / (Estonia) Marleen Mülla (f)
  - Shot Put winners: (Estonia) Kristo Galeta (m) / (Belarus) Viktoryia Kolb (f)
  - Discus Throw winners: (Estonia) Martin Kupper (m) / (Lithuania) Ieva Zarankaitė (f)
  - Javelin Throw winners: (Lithuania) Edis Matusevičius (m) / (Lithuania) Liveta Jasiūnaitė (f)
  - Hammer Throw winners: (Belarus) Siarhei Kalamoyets (m) / (Estonia) Anna Maria Orel (f)
- June 19: Jyväskylä Games in (Finland) Jyväskylä
  - 100 m winners: (Finland) Hanna-Maari Latvala (f)
  - Women's 400 m winner: (United States) Kiah Seymour
  - Men's 800 m winner: (Morocco) Mohamed Aboutahiri
  - Women's 3000 m steeplechase winner: (Finland) Camilla Richardsson
  - Men's 5000 m winner: (Ukraine) Stanislav Maslov
  - Men's 110 m Hurdles winner: (Finland) Elmo Lakka
  - Women's 100 m Hurdles winner: (Poland) Klaudia Siciarz
  - Men's Long Jump winner: (Finland) Roni Ollikainen
  - Women's Triple Jump winner: (Finland) Senni Salminen
  - Hammer Throw winners: (Ukraine) Myhaylo Kokhan (m) / (Finland) Krista Tervo (f)
  - Men's Pole Vault winner: (Finland) Urho Kujanpää
- June 25: Meeting Elite in (France) Montgeron
  - 100 m winners: (South Africa) Simon Magakwe (m) / (South Africa) Carina Horn (f)
  - 400 m winners: (United States) Myles Pringle (m) / (Poland) Małgorzata Hołub-Kowalik (f)
  - 800 m winners: (Morocco) Hamza Belmer (m) / (France) Cynthia Anaïs (f)
  - Men's 3000 m winner: (Portugal) Rui Pinto
  - Men's 110 m Hurdles winner: (South Africa) Antonio Alkana
  - Women's 100 m Hurdles winner: (Haiti) Vanessa Clervaux
  - Women's High Jump winner: (Uzbekistan) Svetlana Radzivil
  - Triple Jump winners: (Cuba) Andy Díaz (m) / (Portugal) Susana Costa (f)
  - Discus Throw winners: (Cyprus) Apostolos Parellis (m) / (Germany) Kristin Pudenz (f)
- June 28: XXIII Meeting Internazionale Citta di Nembro in (Italy) Nembro
  - 100 m winners: (South Africa) Dlodlo Thando (m) / (South Africa) Tamzin Thomas (f)
  - 400 m winners: (Bosnia and Herzegovina) Amel Tuka (m) / (Italy) Ayomide Folorunso (f)
  - 800 m winners: (Qatar) Abdirahman Saeed Hassan (m) / (Italy) Serena Troiani (f)
  - 3000 m winners: (South Africa) Jerry Mustav (m) / (Italy) Marta Zenoni (f)
  - Men's 3000 m Steeplechase winner: (Italy) Pietro Arese
  - Men's 110 m Hurdles winner: (United States) Janet Eaton
  - Women's 100 m Hurdles winner: (Venezuela) Génesis Romero
  - Long Jump winners: (Italy) Gabriele Chilà (m) / (South Africa) Lynique Beneke (f)
  - Women's Pole Vault winner: (Italy) Helen Falda
  - Men's Javelin Throw winner: (Italy) Mauro Fraresso
  - Women's Discus Throw winner: (Brazil) Andressa de Morais
- July 3: Tamperen Games in (Finland) Tampere
  - Men's 200 m winner: (Bahrain) Yaqoob Salem Eid
  - Women's 800 m winner: (Finland) Sara Kuivisto
  - Men's 1500 m winner: (South Africa) Ashley Smith
  - Women's 100 m Hurdles winner: (Finland) Reetta Hurske
  - 400 m Hurdles winners: (Hungary) Tibor Koroknai (m) / (Bahrain) Aminat Yusuf Jamal (f)
  - Men's Pole Vault winner: (Finland) Tommi Holttinen
  - High Jump winners: (Finland) Daniel Kosonen (m) / (Finland) Ella Junnila (f)
  - Women's Long Jump winner: (Finland) Maria Huntington
  - Women's Discus Throw winner: (Germany) Anna Rüh
  - Men's Javelin Throw winner: (Trinidad and Tobago) Keshorn Walcott
- July 6: 12th Triveneto Meeting International in (Italy) Trieste
  - 100 m winners: (South Africa) Thando Dlodlo (m) / (Jamaica) Natalliah Whyte (f)
  - 400 m winners: (Jamaica) Akeem Bloomfield (m) / (Jamaica) Junelle Bromfield (f)
  - Women's 800 m winner: (Italy) Joyce Mattagliano
  - Men's 1500 m winner: (Italy) Matteo Spanu
  - Men's 110 m Hurdles winner: (Australia) Nicholas Hough
  - Men's 100 m Hurdles winner: (Jamaica) Megan Simmonds
  - Men's Long Jump winner: (Norway) Ingar Kiplesund
  - Men's Javelin Throw winner: (Poland) Kacper Oleszczuk
- July 7: Mityng na Rynku Kościuszki in (Poland) Białystok
  - High Jump winners: (Authorised Neutral Athletes) Ilya Ivanyuk (m) / (Poland) Kamila Lićwinko (f)
  - Men's Pole Vault winner: (Poland) Piotr Lisek
  - Shot Put winners: (Brazil) Darlan Romani (m) / (Jamaica) Danniel Thomas-Dodd (f)
- July 9: 30th Meeting Internazionale di Atletica Leggera Sport Soudarieta in (Italy) Lignano Sabbiadoro
  - 100 m winners: (United States) Mike Rodgers (m) / (Brazil) Rosângela Santos (f)
  - Men's 400 m winner: (Trinidad and Tobago) Machel Cedenio
  - 800 m winners: (United Kingdom) Jamie Webb (m) / (Kenya) Eunice Sum (f)
  - 1500 m winners: (Australia) Matthew Ramsden (m) / (United States) Rachel Schneider (f)
  - Women's 100 m Hurdles winner: (Puerto Rico) Jasmine Camacho-Quinn
  - Men's 400 m Hurdles winner: (United States) Robert Grant
  - Women's High Jump winner: (Slovenia) Maruša Černjul
  - Women's Long Jump winner: (United States) Kate Hall
  - Men's Discus Throw winner: (Montenegro) Danijel Furtula
- July 15: Varberg GP in (Sweden) Varberg
  - 100 m winners: (Jamaica) Everton Clarke (m) / (Denmark) Astrid Glenner-Frandsen
  - Women's 200 m winner: (Sweden) Moa Hjelmer
  - 800 m winners: (Sweden) Berhe Kidane (m) / (Australia) Catriona Bisset
  - Men's 110 m Hurdles winner: (Sweden) Fredrick Ekholm
  - Women's 100 m Hurdles winner: (Denmark) Thea Haahr
  - Men's 1000 m winner: (Kenya) Collins Kipruto
  - Women's 3000 m winner: (Sweden) Samrawit Mengsteab
  - Women's High Jump winner: (Montenegro) Marija Vuković
  - Long Jump winners: (Sweden) Andreas Carlsson (m) / (Sweden) Tilde Johansson (f)
  - Shot Put winners: (Sweden) Wictor Petersson (m) / (Sweden) Fanny Roos (f)
  - Discus Throw winners: (Sweden) Daniel Ståhl (m) / (Germany) Anna Rüh (f)
  - Women's Pole Vault winner: (Canada) Alysha Newman
- July 17: Savo Games in (Finland) Lapinlahti
  - Men's 100 m winner: (Malaysia) Jonathan Nyepa
  - Women's 200 m winner: (Sierra Leone) Hafsatu Kamara
  - 1500 m winners: (Germany) Timo Benitz (m) / (Finland) Janica Rauma (f)
  - Men's 3000 m steeplechase winner: (Algeria) Bilal Tabti
  - Women's 5000 m winner: (Belarus) Katsiaryna Karneyenka
  - Women's 100 m Hurdles winner: (Finland) Annimari Korte
  - Women's Discus Throw winner: (Germany) Anna Rüh
  - Men's Javelin Throw winner: (Lithuania) Edis Matusevičius
  - Men's Long Jump winner: (South Africa) Zarck Visser
  - Men's Pole Vault winner: (Finland) Urho Kujanpää
  - Women's Shot Put winner: (Finland) Senja Mäkitörmä
- July 18: 31st Arcobaleno Atletica Europa in (Italy) Celle Ligure
  - 100 m winners: (Nigeria) Jerry Japka (m) / (Nigeria) Joy Udo-Gabriel (f)
  - 200 m winners: (Nigeria) Jerry Japka (m) / (Nigeria) Joy Udo-Gabriel (f)
  - 400 m winners: (United Kingdom) Dan Putnam (m) / (Hungary) Evelin Nádházy (f)
  - 800 m winners: (Italy) Abdessalam Machmach (m) / (Italy) Irene Vian (f)
  - Men's 110 m Hurdles winner: (Brazil) Paulo Henrique da Silva
  - Women's 100 m Hurdles winner: (Hungary) Petra Répási
  - 400 m Hurdles winners: (Japan) Keisuke Nozawa (m) / (South Africa) Zenéy van der Walt (f)
  - High Jump winners: (South Africa) Mpho Links (m) / (Italy) Aurora Burdese (f)
  - Long Jump winners: (Italy) Alessandro Li Veli (m) / (France) Éloyse Lesueur-Aymonin (f)
  - Shot Put winners: (Hungary) Balázs Detrik (m) / (Italy) Sofia Kila (f)
- August 3: #29 (Citius Meeting) in (Switzerland) Bern
- August 3: #30 (Kamila Skolimowska Throwing Festival) in (Poland) Władysławowo
- August 14: #31 (Cork City Games) in (Republic of Ireland) Cork
- August 18: #32 (Meeting International Schifflange) in (Luxembourg) Schifflange
- August 21: #33 (Morten Games) in (Republic of Ireland) Dublin
- August 24 & 25: #34 (Finnkampen Sweden vs Finland) in Stockholm
- September 13: #35 (Madrid Street Athletics) in (Spain) Madrid
- October 5: #36 (32nd Milla Internacional de Berango) in (Spain) Berango
- November 24: #37 (42nd Zurich Marathon San Sebastián) in (Spain) San Sebastián
- November 25: #38 (XXX Carrera Internacional Desde Santurce a Bilbao) in (Spain) Santurtzi-Bilbao

=== EA Outdoor Special Premium Meetings ===
- June 12: Filothei Women Gala in (Greece) Filothei
  - Women's 100 m winner: (Jamaica) Remona Burchell
  - 100 m Hurdles winner: (Belarus) Ruslana Rashkovan
  - Women's High Jump winner: (Greece) Tatiana Gousin
  - Women's Long Jump winner: (United Kingdom) Abigail Irozuru
  - Women's Triple Jump winner: (Germany) Jenny Elbe
  - Women's Pole Vault winner: (Greece) Katerina Stefanidi
- June 21: (Athens Street Pole Vault 2019) in (Greece) Athens
  - Men's Pole Vault winner: (Poland) Piotr Lisek

=== EA Premium Meetings ===
- July 9: Gyulai István Memorial in (Hungary) Székesfehérvar
  - 200 m winners: (United States) Christian Coleman (m) / (The Bahamas) Shaunae Miller-Uibo (f)
  - Women's 400 m winner: (Bahrain) Salwa Eid Naser
  - Women's 2000 m winner: (Ethiopia) Genzebe Dibaba
  - Men's 3000 m winner: (Kenya) Michael Kibet
  - Men's 110 m Hurdles winner: (United States) Grant Holloway
  - Women's 100 m Hurdles winner: (United States) Kendra Harrison
  - 400 m Hurdles winners: (United States) Byron Robinson (m) / (United States) Ashley Spencer (f)
  - Men's High Jump winner: (Authorised Neutral Athletes) Ilya Ivanyuk
  - Women's Long Jump winner: (Authorised Neutral Athletes) Yelena Sokolova
  - Men's Triple Jump winner: (United States) Christian Taylor
  - Men's Discus Throw winner: (Sweden) Daniel Ståhl
  - Hammer Throw winners: (Poland) Paweł Fajdek (m) / (France) Alexandra Tavernier (f)
  - Women's Shot Put winner: (Jamaica) Danniel Thomas-Dodd
- July 9: Spitzen Leichtathletik Luzern in (Switzerland) Luzern
  - 100 m winners: (South Africa) Akani Simbine (m) / (Germany) Gina Lückenkemper (f)
  - 200 m winners: (Jamaica) Akeem Bloomfield (m) / (The Bahamas) Tynia Gaither (f)
  - Women's 400 m winner: (Jamaica) Junelle Bromfield
  - Women's 800 m winner: (United Kingdom) Sarah McDonald
  - 1500 m winners: (Switzerland) Michael Curti (m) / (Switzerland) Nicole Egger (f)
  - Men's 3000 m winner: (Ethiopia) Tadese Worku
  - Men's 110 m Hurdles winner: (China) Xie Wenjun
  - Women's 100 m Hurdles winner: (Nigeria) Oluwatobiloba Amusan
  - 400 m Hurdles winners: (Algeria) Abdelmalik Lahoulou (m) / (Jamaica) Nikita Tracey (f)
  - Men's Long Jump winner: (South Africa) Ruswahl Samaai
  - Hammer Throw winners: (Germany) Tristan Schwandke (m) / (Germany) Charlene Woitha (f)
  - Javelin Throw winners: (Germany) Thomas Röhler (m) / (Australia) Kelsey-Lee Roberts (f)
  - Women's Pole Vault winner: (Canada) Alysha Newman
- August 27: #3 (55th Palio Citta della Quercia) in (Italy) Rovereto
- September 8: #4 (Rieti Meeting) in (Italy) Rieti

=== CAA Major Events ===
- April 16 – 20: 2019 African U20 Championships in Athletics & African Youth Athletics Championships in (Ivory Coast) Abidjan

=== OAA ===
Permit Meetings

- January 18: Capital Classic in Wellington
  - 100 m winners: (New Zealand) Jake Paul (m) / (New Zealand) Sophie Williams (f)
  - 200 m winners: (New Zealand) Edward Nketia (m) / (New Zealand) Zoe Hobbs (f)
  - 400 m winners: (New Zealand) Luke Mercieca (m) / (New Zealand) Emma Osborne (f)
  - 800 m: (New Zealand) Samuel Tanner (m) / (New Zealand) Katherine Camp (f)
  - Women's 100 m Hurdles winner: (New Zealand) Amy Robertson
  - 400 m Hurdles winners: (New Zealand) Louis Andrews (m) / (New Zealand) Portia Bing (f)
  - Women's High Jump winner: (New Zealand) Josephine Reeves
  - Men's Long Jump winner: (New Zealand) Jordan Peters
  - Women's Triple Jump winner: (New Zealand) Ellie Hurley-Langton
  - Discus Throw winners: (New Zealand) Connor Bell (m) / (New Zealand) Siositina Hakeai (f)
  - Javelin Throw winners: (New Zealand) Cam Robinson (m) / (New Zealand) Lexi Maples (f)
  - 4 × 100 m Relay winners: New Zealand Blue (m) / New Zealand A (f)
- January 25: Hunter Track Classic in (Australia) Newcastle
  - 100 m winners: (Australia) Anas Abu-Ganaba (m) / (Australia) Michelle Jenneke (f)
  - 600 m winners: (Australia) Peter Bol (m) / (Australia) Morgan Mitchell (f)
  - 1,500 m winners: (Australia) Luke Mathews (m) / (United Kingdom) Madeleine Murray
  - Men's 3,000 m Steeplechase winner: (Australia) Max Stevens
  - Women's 100 m Hurdles winner: (Australia) Michelle Jenneke
  - High Jump winners: (Australia) Zachary Hayward (m) / (Australia) Hannah Joye (f)
  - Triple Jump winners: (Australia) Connor Murphy (m) / (Australia) Desleigh Owusu (f)
  - Men's Discus Throw winner: (Australia) Lachlan McEntyre
  - Women's Hammer Throw winner: (Australia) Alexandra Hulley
  - Men's Shot Put winner: (Australia) Damien Birkinhead
  - Mixed 1 Mile winner: (Australia) Matthew Joyce
- January 27 & 28: Canberra Track Classic in (Australia) Canberra
  - 100 m winners: (Australia) Jack Hale (m) / (Australia) Celeste Mucci (f)
  - 200 m winners: (New Zealand) Edward Nketia (m) / (Australia) Maddie Coates (f)
  - 400 m winners: (Australia) Tyler Gunn (m) / (Australia) Angeline Blackburn (f)
  - Women's 800 m winner: (New Zealand) Katherine Camp
  - Men's 1,500 m winner: (Republic of Ireland) Sean Antion Tobin
  - Men's 110 m Hurdles winner: (Australia) Nicholas Hough
  - 400 m Hurdles winners: (New Zealand) Michael Cochrane (m) / (Australia) Sarah Carli (f)
  - Long Jump winners: (Australia) Henry Smith (m) / (Australia) Brooke Stratton (f)
  - Women's Triple Jump winner: (Ukraine) Mariia Sinei
  - Men's Pole Vault winner: (Australia) Kurtis Marschall
  - Women's Discus Throw winner: (Australia) Taryn Gollshewsky
  - Hammer Throw winners: (Australia) William Brown (m) / (Australia) Alexandra Hulley (f)
  - Javelin Throw winners: (New Zealand) Ben Langton Burnell (m) / (New Zealand) Tori Peeters (f)
  - Men's Shot Put winner: (Australia) Damien Birkinhead
- February 9: Porritt Classic in (New Zealand) Hamilton
  - 100 m winners: (New Zealand) Edward Nketia (m) / (New Zealand) Brooke Somerfield (f)
  - 200 m winners: (New Zealand) Edward Nketia (m) / (New Zealand) Abby Goldie (f)
  - 400 m winners: (New Zealand) Luke Mercieca (m) / (New Zealand) Charlotte Holland (f)
  - 800 m winners: (New Zealand) Dominic Devlin (m) / (New Zealand) Stella Pearless (f)
  - 1,500 m winners: (New Zealand) Jacob Priddey (m) / (New Zealand) Katherine Camp (f)
  - 100 m Hurdles winners: (New Zealand) Zachary Saunders (m) / (New Zealand) Fiona Morrison (f)
  - Men's 110 m Hurdles winners: (New Zealand) Joshua Hawkins
  - 400 m Hurdles winners: (New Zealand) Olly Parkinson (m) / (New Zealand) Alessandra Macdonald (f)
  - High Jump winners: (New Zealand) Hamish Kerr (m) / (New Zealand) Keeley O'Hagan (f)
  - Long Jump winners: (New Zealand) Jordan Peters (m) / (Australia) Corinna Minko (f)
  - Javelin Throw: (Japan) Genki Dean (m) / (New Zealand) Tori Peeters (f)
  - Shot Put winners: (New Zealand) Jacko Gill (m) / (New Zealand) Maddi Wesche (f)
  - Mixed Discus Throw winner: (New Zealand) Siositina Hakeai
  - Mixed Hammer Throw winner: (New Zealand) Antony Nobilo
- February 23: Sydney Track Classic in (Australia) Sydney
  - Men's 100 m winner: (Australia) Jack Hale
  - Women's 200 m winner: (New Zealand) Olivia Eaton
  - 400 m winners: (Australia) Alexander Beck (m) / (Australia) Anneliese Rubie-Renshaw (f)
  - 800 m winners: (New Zealand) Brad Mathas (m) / (Australia) Georgia Griffith (f)
  - 1,500 m winners: (Australia) Ryan Gregson (m) / (United Kingdom) Madeleine Murray (f)
  - Men's 3,000 m Steeplechase winner: (Australia) Max Stevens
  - 5,000 m winners: (Australia) Jordan Gusman (m) / (Australia) Melissa Duncan (f)
  - Women's 100 m Hurdles winner: (Australia) Celeste Mucci
  - Men's 110 m Hurdles winner: (Australia) Nicholas Andrews
  - 400 m Hurdles winners: (Australia) Ian Dewhurst (m) / (New Zealand) Portia Bing (f)
  - Women's High Jump winner: (Australia) Nicola McDermott
  - Women's Long Jump winner: (Australia) Brooke Stratton
  - Men's Triple Jump winner: (Australia) Alwyn Jones
  - Pole Vault winners: (Australia) Angus Armstrong (m) / (New Zealand) Olivia McTaggart (f)
  - Women's Discus Throw winner: (Australia) Kim Mulhall
  - Hammer Throw winners: (Australia) William Brown (m) / (Australia) Alexandra Hulley (f)
  - Javelin Throw winners: (Australia) Hamish Peacock (m) / (Australia) Katrina Blackett (f)
  - Women's Shot Put winner: (New Zealand) Victoria Owers
  - Mixed 4 × 400 m Relay winners: (Australia) Ryde Little Athletics
- March 2: Sir Peter Snell International Meeting in (New Zealand) Whanganui
  - Women's 100 m winner: (New Zealand) Sophie Williams
  - Men's 200 m winner: (New Zealand) Joseph Millar
  - 400 m winners: (New Zealand) Travis Bayler (m) / (New Zealand) Tayla Brunger (f)
  - Men's 800 m winner: (New Zealand) Brad Mathas
  - Long Jump winners: (New Zealand) Jordan Peters (m) / (New Zealand) Genna Maples (f)
  - Women's Hammer Throw winner: (New Zealand) Nicole Bradley
  - Shot Put winners: (New Zealand) Josefa Tamaniyaga (m) / (New Zealand) Nicole Bennett (f)
  - Men's 1 Mile winner: (Australia) Rorey Hunter
  - Mixed 800 m winner: (New Zealand) Rebecca Baker
- March 16: Perth Track Classic in (Australia) Perth
  - 100 m winners: (Australia) Jack Hale (m) / (Australia) Sophie White (f)
  - 200 m winners: (Australia) Rohan Browning (m) / (Australia) Sophie White (f)
  - Men's 400 m winner: (Australia) Adam Kopp
  - 800 m winners: (Australia) Luke Mathews (m) / (Australia) Georgia Griffith (f)
  - Women's 100 m Hurdles winner: (Australia) Brianna Beahan
  - Men's 110 m Hurdles winner: (Australia) Nicholas Andrews
  - 400 m Hurdles winners: (Australia) Ian Dewhurst (m) / (Australia) Alanah Yukich (f)
  - High Jump winners: (Australia) Grant Szalek (m) / (Australia) Nicola McDermott
  - Long Jump winners: (Australia) Darcy Roper (m) / (Australia) Naa Anang (f)
  - Pole Vault winners: (Australia) Declan Carruthers (m) / (Australia) Lauren Hyde-Cooling
  - Javelin Throw winners: (Australia) Hamish Peacock (m) / (Australia) Lara Ilievski (f)
  - Men's 1 Mile winner: (Australia) Matthew Ramsden
  - Mixed Discus Throw winner: (Australia) Matthew Denny
  - Mixed Shot Put winner: (Australia) Etienne Rousseau
  - Mixed 1 Mile winner: (Australia) Cameron Quirk
  - Mixed 4 × 100 m winners: (Australia) City of Melville
- March 21: Sir Graeme Douglas International in Auckland
  - 100 m winners: (New Zealand) Edward Nketia (m) / (New Zealand) Portia Bing (f)
  - Men's 400 m winner: (New Zealand) Luke Mercieca
  - 800 m winners: (New Zealand) Sam Petty (m) / (New Zealand) Katherine Camp (f)
  - Men's 5,000 m winner: (New Zealand) Oli Chignell
  - Women's High Jump winner: (New Zealand) Josephine Reeves
  - Pole Vault winners: (New Zealand) Nick Southgate (m) / (New Zealand) Olivia McTaggart (f)
  - Shot Put winners: (Poland) Konrad Bukowiecki (m) / (United States) Chase Ealey (f)
  - Mixed 4 × 100 m winners: New Zealand Men (Jacob Stockwell, Matteus Pio, Tyron Hilton, Mogammad Smith)
- March 23: Queensland Track Classic in Brisbane
  - 100 m winners: (Japan) Yoshihide Kiryū (m) / (New Zealand) Zoe Hobbs (f)
  - 200 m winners: (Japan) Yoshihide Kiryū (m) / (Australia) Nana-Adoma Owusu-Afriyie (f)
  - 400 m winners: (Japan) Julian Walsh (m) / (Australia) Ellie Beer (f)
  - Men's 800 m winner: (Australia) Mason Cohen (m) /
  - 1,500 m winners: (Australia) Luke Mathews (m) / (United Kingdom) Madeleine Murray (f)
  - Men's 110 m Hurdles winner: (Australia) Nicholas Hough
  - Women 100 m Hurdles winner: (Australia) Michelle Jenneke
  - 400 m Hurdles winners: (Japan) Ryo Kajiki (m) / (Japan) Mayu Saito (f)
  - High Jump winners: (New Zealand) Hamish Kerr (m) / (Australia) Cassie Purdon (f)
  - Triple Jump winners: (Malaysia) Muhammad Hakimi Ismail (m) / (Australia) Ellen Pettitt (f)
  - Long Jump winners: (Australia) Darcy Roper (m) / (Australia) Brooke Stratton (f)
  - Discus Throw winners: (Australia) Matthew Denny (m) / (Australia) Taryn Gollshewsky (f)
  - Javelin Throw winners: (Australia) Liam O'Brien (m) / (Australia) Kelsey-Lee Barber (f)
  - Men's Shot Put winner: (Australia) Damien Birkinhead
  - Mixed 3,000 m Relay winner: (Australia) Dane Bird-Smith
  - Men's 4 × 100 m Relay winners: Australia (Jake Doran, Rohan Browning, Jack Hale, Alex Hartmann)
  - Mixed 4 × 400 m Relay winners: Australia (Ian Halpin, Tyler Gunn, Alexander Beck, Steven Solomon)
- June 21: Oceania Invitational in (Australia) Townsville
- July 6: Fiji International Grand Prix in Lautoka (final)
  - 100 m winners: (Fiji) Banuve Tabakaucoro (m) / (Fiji) Heleina Young (f)
  - 200 m winners: (Fiji) Banuve Tabakaucoro (m) / (Tonga) Taina Halasima (f)
  - 400 m winners: (Fiji) Kameli Ravuci (m) / (Fiji) Ana Baleveicau (f)
  - 800 m winners: (Fiji) Petero Veitagomaki (m) / (Guam) Genina Criss (f)
  - 3000 m winners: (Fiji) Avikash Lal (m) / (Fiji) Vilimaina Naituku (f)
  - Men's 110 m Hurdles winner: (Tonga) Talatala Po'oi
  - Women's 100 m Hurdles winner: (Fiji) Elenani Tinal
  - High Jump winners: (Tonga) Mosese Foliaki (m) / (Fiji) Shawntell Lockington (f)
  - Long Jump winners: (Japan) Ryuji Yamazaki (m) / (Fiji) Elenani Tinal (f)
  - Triple Jump winners: (Fiji) Eugene Vollmer (m) / (Fiji) Fane Savvakacolo (f)
  - Javelin Throw winners: (Japan) Takuya Mayajima (m) / (Fiji) Elena Caucau (f)
  - Discus Throw winners: (Fiji) Mustafa Fall (m) / (Tonga) Atamaama Tu'utafaiva (f)
  - Shot Put winners: (Fiji) Mustafa Fall (m) / (Tonga) Atamaama Tu'utafaiva (f)
  - Mixed 4 × 100 m Relay winners: Fiji B
  - Mixed 4 × 400 m Relay winners: Fiji B

Major Events

- February 17: Oceania 10 km Road Championships in (Australia) Hobart
  - Winners: (Australia) Brett Robinson (m) / (Australia) Milly Clark (f)
- June 25–28: Oceania Area Championships in (Australia) Townsville
- June 28: Oceania 10 km Racewalk Championships in (Australia) Townsville
- July 7: Oceania Marathon and Half Marathon Championships in (Australia) Gold Coast
- August 31 – September 7: Oceania Masters Athletics Championships in TBD place
- December 2: Oceania 50 km Racewalk Championships in (Australia) Melbourne

=== AAA Major Events and Asian Permit Meetings ===
- March 2 & 3: Southeast Asian Youth Athletics Championships in (Philippines) Ilagan
  - (gold) : Thailand
  - (silver) : Vietnam
  - (bronze) : Malaysia
  - 4th: Indonesia
- March 15–17: 2019 Asian Youth Athletics Championships in Hong Kong
  - (gold) : China
  - (silver) : India
  - (bronze) : Japan
  - 4th: Chinese Taipei
- April 21 – 24: 2019 Asian Athletics Championships in (Qatar) Doha
  - (gold) : China
  - (silver) : Bahrain
  - (bronze) : Japan
  - 4th: India

Asian Permit Meetings

- April 21: 67th Hyōgo Relay Carnival in (Japan) Kobe (PM #1)
- April 27 – 29: 53rd Oda Memorial Meet in (Japan) Hiroshima (PM #2)
- May 3: 35th Shizuoka International Meet in (Japan) Fukuroi
- May 6: Michitaka Kinami Memorial Meet in (Japan) Osaka
- May 25: Taiwan Open Athletics Championships in Taipei
  - 100 m winners: (Canada) Andre De Grasse (m) / (Hong Kong) Lam On Ki (f)
  - 200 m winners: (Japan) Kenji Fujimitsu (m) / (Singapore) Veronica Shanti Pereira (f)
  - 400 m: (Japan) Kentarō Satō (m) / (Japan) Nanako Matsumoto (f)
  - 800 m winners: (Japan) Taichi Ichino (m) / (Chinese Taipei) Shen Chia-ni (f)
  - 1,500 m winners: (Chinese Taipei) Wen-Lien Chung (m) / (North Korea) Kim Kuk-hyang (f)
  - 5,000 m winners: (Chinese Taipei) Lee Chi-ju (m) / (Vietnam) Nguyễn Thị Oanh (f)
  - Men's 10,000 m winner: (Chinese Taipei) Ho Chin-ping
  - 3000 m steeplechase winners: (Chinese Taipei) Lee Chi-ju (m) / (Vietnam) Nguyễn Thị Oanh (f)
  - Men's 110 m Hurdles winner: (Chinese Taipei) Chen Kuei-ru
  - Women's 100 m Hurdles winner: (Japan) Hitomi Shimura
  - 400 m Hurdles winners: (Chinese Taipei) Chen Chieh (m) / (Philippines) Robyn Brown (f)
  - High Jump winners: (Japan) Keitarō Fujita (m) / (Thailand) Wanida Boonwan (f)
  - Long Jump winners: (Chinese Taipei) Lin Yu-tang (m) / (Hong Kong) Yue Ya Xin (f)
  - Triple Jump winners: (United States) Christian Taylor (m) / (Vietnam) Hà Vũ Thị Ngọc (f)
  - Discus Throw winners: (Japan) Masateru Yugami (m) / (Thailand) Subenrat Insaeng (f)
  - Hammer Throw winners: (Japan) Ryota Kashimura (m) / (Japan) Akane Watanabe
  - Javelin Throw: (Chinese Taipei) Cheng Chao-tsun (m) / (Chinese Taipei) Chiu Yu-ting (f)
  - Pole Vault winners: (South Korea) Jin Min-sub (m) / (Chinese Taipei) Shen Yi-Ju (f)
  - Shot Put: (South Korea) Jung Il-woo (m) / (Chinese Taipei) Lin Jia-ying (f)
  - 4 × 100 m winners: Chinese Taipei (Wei Tai-sheng, Wang Wei-hsu, Yang Chun-han, Cheng Po-yu) (m) / Thailand (Sureewan Runan, Kwanrutai Pakdee, Tassaporn Wannakit, Supawan Thipat) (f)
  - 4 × 400 m winners: Chinese Taipei (Lai Kuan-yu, Yu Chen-yi, Chen Chieh, Yang Lung-Hsiang) (m) / Thailand (Sureewan Runan, Arisa Weruwanarak, Ratchada Talee, Chinenye Josephine Onuorah) (f)

=== NACAC Permit Meetings ===
- February 22: Gibson – McCook Relays in (Jamaica) Kingston (PM #1)
  - 100 m winners: (Jamaica) Andrew Fisher (m) / (Jamaica) Kemba Nelson (f)
  - 400 m winners: (Jamaica) Malik James-King (m) / (Barbados) Sada Williams (f)
  - 1,600 m winners: (Jamaica) Chadoye Dawson (m) / (Jamaica) Samantha James (f)
  - High Jump winners: (Jamaica) Carlington Moulton (m) / (Jamaica) Janique Burgher (f)
  - Long Jump winners: (Jamaica) Wayne Pinnock (m) / (The Bahamas) Tamara Myers (f)
  - Men's Pole Vault winner: (Jamaica) Andrew Betton (m)
- March 15 & 16: 14TH Spring Break Classic in (Puerto Rico) Gurabo (PM #2)
  - 100 m winners: (Dominican Republic) Raymond Moises Urbino Tejada (m) / (Venezuela) Aries Sánchez (f)
  - 200 m winners: (Puerto Rico) Adrian Agosto (m) / (Puerto Rico) Grace Claxton (f)
  - 400 m winners: (Puerto Rico) Michael Jordan (m) / (Jamaica) Asaine Hall (f)
  - 800 m winners: (Jamaica) Shevan Parks (m) / (Puerto Rico) Angelin Figueroa (f)
  - 1,500 m winners: (Puerto Rico) Erik Estrada (m) / (Colombia) Angie Nocua (f)
  - 3000 metres steeplechase winners: (Colombia) Yuber Echeverri (m) / (Argentina) Carolina Lozano (f)
  - Men's 5,000 m winner: (Puerto Rico) Nahir Pinto
  - Women's 10,000 m winner: (Puerto Rico) Ashley Laureano
  - Men's 110 m winner: (United States) Sidney Gibbons
  - Women's 100 m winner: (United States) Sophia Myers
  - 400 m Hurdles winners: (Puerto Rico) Ramfis Vega (m) / (Puerto Rico) Grace Claxton (f)
  - Pole Vault winners: (United States) Luis Martinez (m) / (Puerto Rico) Yaritza Diaz (f)
  - High Jump winners: (Puerto Rico) Joshua Medina (m) / (Puerto Rico) Ariana Maldonado (f)
  - Long Jump winners: (Puerto Rico) Michael Williams (m) / (Venezuela) Aries Sánchez (f)
  - Triple Jump winners: (Venezuela) Edinson Luna (m) / (Peru) Candy Toche (f)
  - Discus Throw winners: (Puerto Rico) Ediberto Gonzalez (m) / (Jamaica) Venique Harris (f)
  - Hammer Throw winners: (Puerto Rico) Jerome Vega (m) / (Puerto Rico) Franshesly Rodríguez Torres (f)
  - Javelin Throw winners: (Puerto Rico) Félix Torres (m) / (Puerto Rico) Coralys Ortiz (f)
  - Shot Put winners: (Puerto Rico) Albert Crespo (m) / (United States) Tara Belisnky
  - 4 × 100 m winners: (Puerto Rico) Interamerican University (Ricardo Feliciano Pineir, Raymond Moises Urbino Tejada, Alexis Ojeda, Jose Mojica) (m) / (United States) Fairleigh Dickinson (Jazmyn Lewis, Kylia Smith, Shanice Watkins, Madeline Price)
  - 4 × 400 m winners: (United States) University at Albany (Alex Velazquez, Matt Leliever, Walter Briggs, Jan Michael Gutierrez) (m) / (Puerto Rico) Interamerican University (Yamilette Gonzalez, Nilitza Malave, Magaly Correa, Geisha Castro)
- April 6: 3rd Barbados and Trinidad & Tobago Youth Dual in (Trinidad and Tobago) Port of Spain (PM #3)
  - Cancelled
- April 6: Kim Collins Invitational in Saint Kitts and Nevis (PM #4)
  - Cancelled
- April 13: Blas Beato Memoriam Track Meet in (Cuba) Havana (PM #5)
- April 26 & 27: Drake Relays in (United States) Des Moines (PM #6)
  - 1,500 m winners: (United States) Jed Helker (m) / (United Kingdom) Scarlet Dale (f)
  - 3,000 m Steeplechase winners: (United States) Awet Yohannes (m) / (United States) Breanna Sieracki (f)
  - 5,000 m winners: (United States) Reed Fischer (m) / (United States) Maddie Van Beek (f)
  - 10,000 m winners: (United States) Brogan Austin (m) / (United States) Megan Billington (f)
  - Pole Vault winners: (United States) Andrew Irwin (m) / (United States) Emily Grove (f)
  - Men's Decathlon winner: (United States) Teddy Frid
  - Women's Heptathlon winner: (United States) Emilyn Dearman
- April 27: Penn Relays in Philadelphia
  - Sprint Medley winners: Kenya (Mike Mokamba Nyang'au, Alphas Kishoyian, Collins Omae Gichana, Collins Kipruto) (m) / United States (Dezerea Bryant, Aaliyah Brown, Destiny Carter, Raevyn Rogers) (f)
  - 4 × 100 m winners: United States Red (Christopher Belcher, Bryce Robinson, Isiah Young, Mike Rodgers) (m) / Jamaica (Shelly-Ann Fraser-Pryce, Natasha Morrison, Shillonie Calvert, Shashalee Forbes) (f)
  - 4 × 400 m winners: United States Red (Mylik Kerley, Michael Cherry, Dontavius Wright, Je'von Hutchison) (m) / Jamaica Gold (Shericka Jackson, Janieve Russell, Christine Day, Stephenie Ann McPherson) (f)
- May 4: Quadrangular Meet (Haiti, Dominican Republic, TKS, Martinique) in Santo Domingo
- June 1: Cayman Islands Invitational in George Town
- June 7: Speed River Inferno Guelph in Canada
  - 100 m winners: (United States) Kenzo Cotton (m) / (Canada) Shaina Harrison (f)
  - 400 m winners: (Canada) Philip Osei (m) / (Canada) Alicia Brown (f)
  - 800 m winners: (Canada) Stephen Evans (m) / (Canada) Melissa Bishop (f)
  - 1,500 m winners: (Canada) Craig Klomp (m) / (Canada) Geneviève Lalonde (f)
  - Pole Vault winners: (Serbia) Miloš Savić (m) / (Canada) Alysha Newman (f)
  - Men's High Jump winner: (United States) Herbert Gary
- June 8: Racers Grand Prix in (Jamaica) Kingston
- June 29: BVI Twilight Meeting in British Virgin Islands
- July 1: Harry Jerome Classic in (Canada) Vancouver
- October 19: Guadeloupe Petit-Bourg NACAC 10K in Guadeloupe

=== NACAC Major Events ===
- January 27: CADICA Cross Country Championships in (Costa Rica) San José
  - 10 km winners: (Costa Rica) Juan Ramón Fallas (m) / (El Salvador) Idelma Delgado (f)
  - U20 8 km winners: (Costa Rica) Jorge Jesus Prendas (m) / (Costa Rica) Noelia Vargas (f)
- February 16: 2019 NACAC Cross Country Championships in (Trinidad and Tobago) Port of Spain
  - U20 winners: (Canada) Evan Burke (b) / (Canada) Taryn O'Neill (g)
  - Senior winners: (United States) Abbabiya Simbassa (m) / (United States) Breanna Sieracki (f)
- February 23 & 24: 2019 CADICA Race Walking Championships in Guatemala City
  - 50 km winners: (Guatemala) Erick Barrondo (m) / (Guatemala) Mirna Ortiz (f)
  - 20 km winners: (Guatemala) José Calel (m) / (Guatemala) Maritza Poncio (f)
- May 17 – 19: 2019 CADICA U18 – U20 Championships in San Salvador
  - 1st place: Costa Rica, 2nd place: El Salvador, 3rd place: Guatemala, 4th place: Panama, 5th place: Nicaragua, 6th place: Belize, 7th place: HON
- June 21–23: 2019 Central American Championships in Athletics in Managua
  - 1st place: Costa Rica, 2nd place: Guatemala, 3rd place: Panama, 4th place: El Salvador, 5th place: Nicaragua, 6th place: Belize, 7th place: HON
- July 5–7: 2019 NACAC U23 Championships in Athletics in Querétaro
  - Ranking after medals (U18): 1. Mexico, 2. Jamaica, 3. Canada, 4. Barbados, 5. Bahamas, El Salvador, Puerto Rico, Trinidad and Tobago, 6. Costa Rica, 7. Bermuda, 8. Antigua and Barbuda, Dominica, Saint Vincent and the Grenadines
  - Ranking after medals (U23): 1. United States, 2. Jamaica, 3. Mexico
- July 6 & 7: 2019 Pan American Combined Events Cup in (Canada) Ottawa
- July 19–21: 2019 Pan American U20 Athletics Championships in (Costa Rica) San José
- November 22–24: 2019 Central American Age Group Championships in Athletics in Panama City

=== CONSUDATLE ===
CONSUDATLE Permit Meetings

- March 23 & 24: Grand Prix Estrella Puente in Montevideo
  - 100 m winners: (Paraguay) Mateo Vargas (m) / (Brazil) Anny Caroline de Bassi
  - 400 m winners: (Brazil) Bruno Rihan Suello da Silva (m) / (Chile) Poulette Cardoch Ramos (f)
  - Women's 800 m winner: (Brazil) Jaqueline Beatriz Weber
  - Men's 1,500 m winner: (Argentina) Fabián Manrique
  - 5,000 m winners: (Colombia) Cristian Moreno (m) / (Colombia) Angie Moreno (f)
  - Women's 10,000 m winner: (Uruguay) Natalie Bengoa
  - 3,000 m steeplechase winners: (Argentina) Antonio Ruiz (m) / (Brazil) Tatiane Raquel da Silva (f)
  - High Jump winners: (Uruguay) Mauro Pons (m) / (Uruguay) Lorena Aires (f)
  - Men's Long Jump winner: (Brazil) Lucas Marcelino dos Santos
  - Pole Vault winners: (Brazil) Abel Curtinove (m) / (Brazil) Bruna Rigo (f)
  - Discus Throw winners: (Uruguay) Rodolfo Casanova (m) / (Brazil) Adriele Petini (f)
  - Hammer Throw winners: (Brazil) Leanderson Souza Ferreira (m) / (Brazil) Tania Milena Ancelmo da Silva (f)
  - Javelin Throw winners: (Uruguay) Lautaro Techera (m) / (Argentina) Martina Corra (f)
  - 4 × 400 m winners: Uruguay (m) / Uruguay (f)
- March 24: Grand Prix Darwin Piñeyrúa in (Uruguay) Montevideo
  - 200 m winners: (Brazil) Bruno Rihan Suello da Silva (m) / (Brazil) Anny Caroline de Bassi (f)
  - Men's 800 m winner: (Uruguay) Jairo Moreira
  - Women's 1,500 m winner: (Brazil) Tatiane Raquel da Silva
  - Men's 10,000 m winner: (Argentina) Luis Molina
  - 400 m Hurdles winners: (Chile) Alfredo Sepúlveda (m) / (Argentina) Rocío Donnet (f)
  - Women's Long Jump winner: (Brazil) Eduarda Schmitt da Silva
  - Triple Jump winners: (Argentina) Maximiliano Díaz (m) / (Brazil) Pyetra Romero Barcellos (f)
  - Shot Put winners: (Brazil) Saymon Rangel Hoffmann (m) / (Brazil) Adriele Petini (f)
  - 4 × 100 m winners: Brazil (m) / Brazil (f)
- March 29: Grand Prixs Sudamericano Noemí Simonetto in (Argentina) Concepción del Uruguay
  - 100 m winners: (Argentina) Otilio Rosa Puntiel (m) / (Brazil) Vitória Cristina Rosa (f)
  - 800 m winners: (Venezuela) Lucirio Antonio Garrido (m) / (Argentina) Mariana Borelli (f)
  - Men's 5000 m winner: (Argentina) José Zabala
  - 400 m Hurdles winners: (Chile) Alfredo Sepúlveda (m) / (Brazil) Alessandra Santos Silva
  - Men's High Jump winner: (Brazil) Guilherme Cobbo
  - Men's Long Jump winner: (Brazil) Tiago Da Silva
  - Men's Hammer Throw winner: (Chile) Humberto Mansilla
  - Men's Javeline Throw winner: (Argentina) Braian Toledo
  - Men's Pole Vault winner: (Argentina) Germán Chiaraviglio
- March 30: Grand Prixs Sudamericano 50 Aniversario del CEF N° 3 in (Argentina) Concepción del Uruguay
  - Men's 200 m winner: (Argentina) Otilio Rosa Puntiel
  - 400 m winners: (Chile) Alfredo Sepúlveda (m) / (Argentina) Noelia Anahí Martínez (f)
  - Women's 5,000 m winner: (Argentina) Florencia Borelli
  - Men's 110 m Hurdles winner: (Argentina) Agustín Carrera
  - Women's 100 m Hurdles winner: (Chile) María Ignacia Eguiguren
  - Women's High Jump winner: (Uruguay) Lorena Aires
  - Women's Long Jump winner: (Chile) Macarena Reyes
  - Men's Triple Jump winner: (Suriname) Miguel van Assen
  - Women's Discus Throw winner: (Chile) Karen Gallardo
  - Women's Hammer Throw winner: (Argentina) Jennifer Dahlgren
  - Women's Javelin Throw winner: (Argentina) Johana Arias Dominella
  - Women's Pole Vault winner: (Argentina) Sofia Hryncyszyn
  - Shot Put winners: (Argentina) Germán Lauro (m) / (Chile) Ivana Gallardo (f)
- March 31: Grand Prixs Sudamericano Hugo La Nasa in Concepción del Uruguay
  - 100 m winners: (Argentina) Otilio Rosa Puntiel (m) / (Brazil) Vitória Cristina Rosa (f)
  - 1,500 m winners: (Venezuela) Lucirio Antonio Garrido (m) / (Argentina) Florencia Borelli (f)
  - Men's 110 m Hurdles winner: (Argentina) Agustín Carrera
  - Men's High Jump winner: (Brazil) Talles Silva
  - Men's Long Jump winner: (Chile) Daniel Pineda
  - Hammer Throw winners: (Chile) Gabriel Kehr (m) / (Brazil) Mariana Marcelino (f)
  - Men's Javeline Throw winner: (Colombia) Arley Ibargüen
  - Men's Pole Vault winner: (Brazil) Augusto Dutra de Oliveira
  - Shot Put winners: (Argentina) Germán Lauro (m) / (Chile) Ivana Gallardo (f)
  - 4 × 400 m winners: Argentina 1 (Damián Moretta, Matías Falchetti, Pedro Garrido, Elián Larregina) (m) / Argentina 1 (María Ayelén Diogo, Fiorella Chiappe, Valeria Mariana Baron, Noelia Anahí Martínez)
- April 4: Grand Prix Ciudad de Concepción in (Chile) Concepción
  - Women's 100 m winner: (Brazil) Vitória Cristina Rosa
  - Men's 400 m winner: (Brazil) Mahagu Sogimati
  - Men's 800 m winner: (Chile) Lucirio Antonio Garrido
  - Women's 1,500 m winner: (Uruguay) María Pía Fernández
  - Men's 5,000 m winner: (Argentina) Fabián Manrique
  - Men's Long Jump winner: (Brazil) Alexsandro de Melo
- April 6: Grand Prix Orlando Guaita in (Chile) Santiago
  - Women's 100 m winner: (Brazil) Vitória Cristina Rosa
  - 400 m winners: (Chile) Alfredo Sepúlveda (m) / (Argentina) Noelia Martínez (f)
  - 1,500 m winners: (Venezuela) Lucirio Antonio Garrido (m) / (Uruguay) María Pía Fernández (f)
  - Women's Long Jump winner: (Brazil) Keila Costa
  - Men's Triple Jump winner: (Brazil) Alexsandro de Melo
  - Men's Hammer Throw winner: (Chile) Gabriel Kehr
  - Men's Javeline Throw winner: (Argentina) Braian Toledo
- April 13 & 14: Grand Prix Richard Boroto in (Ecuador) Cuenca
  - 200 m winners: (Ecuador) Andreson Marquinez (m) / (Peru) Diana Bazalar (f)
  - Women's 800 m winner: (Ecuador) Andrea Calderon
  - Women's 100 m Hurdles winner: (Peru) Diana Bazalar
  - Men's Discus Throw winner: (Colombia) Mauricio Ortega
  - Women's Hammer Throw winner: (Ecuador) Valeria Chiliquinga
  - Javelin Throw winners: (Ecuador) José Escobar (m) / (Colombia) María Lucelly Murillo (f)
  - Triple Jump winners: (Ecuador) Frixon Chila (m) / (Ecuador) Liuba Maria Zaldívar (f)
  - Men's Pole Vault winner: (Ecuador) Dyander Pacho
  - Women's 4 × 100 m Relay winner: Peru
- April 24: Grand Prix Mario Paz in (Bolivia) Cochabamba
  - 100 m winners: (Paraguay) Christopher Ortiz (m) / (Chile) Javiera Cañas (f)
  - 200 m winners: (Brazil) Jhonatan Chavez (m) / (Chile) María Fernanda Mackenna (f)
  - 400 m winners: (Bolivia) Andres Sotomayor Arebalo (m) / (Bolivia) Cecilia Evangelina Gomez Lopez (f)
  - 5,000 m winners: (Bolivia) Daniel Toroya Paqui (m) / (Bolivia) Brianda Escalera (f)
  - Women's 100 m Hurdles winner: (Paraguay) Ana Camila Pirelli
  - Long Jump winners: (Bolivia) Erick Suarez Lima (m) / (Brazil) Keila Costa (f)
  - Triple Jump winners: (Brazil) Alexandro do Nascemento (m) / (Brazil) Gabrielle Souza Santos (f)
  - Men's Javeline Throw winner: (Brazil) Mauricio Britos
  - Men's Shot Put winner: (Brazil) Willian Braido
- April 26: Grand Prix Julia Iriarte in (Bolivia) Cochabamba
  - 100 m winners: (Chile) Enrique Polanco (m) / (Chile) Isidora Jiménez (f)
  - 200 m winners: (Brazil) Jhonatan Chavez (m) / (Chile) Isidora Jiménez (f)
  - 400 m winners: (Bolivia) Andres Sotomayor Arebalo (m) / (Chile) María Fernanda Mackenna (f)
  - 1,500 m winners: (Bolivia) Rubén Toroya Paqui (m) / (Bolivia) Helen Daniela Baltazar (f)
  - Long Jump winners: (Uruguay) Emiliano Lasa (m) / (Brazil) Keila Costa (f)
  - Triple Jump winners: (Brazil) Mateus de Sá (m) / (Brazil) Gabrielle Souza Santos (f)
  - Men's Javelin Throw winner: (Brazil) Mauricio de Brito Filgueiras
  - Men's Shot Put winner: (Brazil) Willian Braido
  - Men's 4 × 100 m winners: Chile (Rodrigo Opazo, Enrique Polanco, Enzo Faulman, Ignacio Nordetti)
- May 1: Grand Prix Internacional Ximena Restrepo in (Colombia) Medellín
  - 100 m winners: (Cuba) Arnaldo Romero Crespo (m) / (Colombia) Darlenys Obregón (f)
  - Men's 200 m winner: (Colombia) Bernardo Baloyes
  - 400 m winners: (Colombia) Anthony Zambrano (m) / (Jamaica) Asaine Hall (f)
  - 800 m winners: (Cuba) Jorge Félix Liranzo Martínez (m) / (Colombia) Johana Arrieta
  - Men's 3000 metres steeplechase winner: (Colombia) Fabian Hinestroza
  - 5000 m winners: (Colombia) Carlos San Martín (m) / (Colombia) Grey Kelly Delgado (f)
  - Men's 110 m hurdles winner: (Colombia) Fanor Escobar
  - Women's 100 m Hurdles winner: (Colombia) Eliecith Palacios
  - High Jump winners: (Colombia) Yohan Chaverra (m) / (Colombia) María Fernanda Murillo (f)
  - Men's Long Jump winner: (Colombia) Raúl Mena
  - Women's Triple Jump winner: (Colombia) Yosiris Urrutia
  - Men's Discus Throw winner: (Jamaica) Chad Dimitri Wright
  - Women's Hammer Throw winner: (Colombia) Mayra Gaviria
  - Shot Put winners: (Colombia) Jhon Freddy Zea (m) / (Colombia) Anyela Marcela Rivas (f)
- May 3 & 4: Grand Prix Memorial Brigido Iriarte in (Venezuela) Caracas
- May 4: Grand Prix de Paraguay in Asunción
  - 100 m winners: (Brazil) Erik Cardoso (m) / (Paraguay) Hiebert Noreen Xenia Klassen (f)
  - 200 m winners: (Paraguay) Christopher Josue Ortiz Gonzalez (m) / (Paraguay) Ana Camila Pirelli (f)
  - 400 m winners: (Brazil) Cleverson da Silva Pereira (m) (non GP) / (Brazil) Érica Geni Barbosa Cavalheiro (f) (non GP)
  - Men's 800 m winner: (Argentina) Diego Facundo Alegre
  - 5000 m winners: (Paraguay) Derlis Ayala (m) / (Paraguay) María Leticia Añazco Colman (f)
  - Women's 100 m Hurdles winner: (Paraguay) Ana Camila Pirelli
  - 400 m Hurdles winners: (Paraguay) Ivan Mathias Cubas Paredes (m) (non GP) / (Paraguay) Fátima Denisse Amarilla Gaona (f)
  - Long Jump winners: (Paraguay) Noelia Giselle Vera Aguilar (f) (non GP)
  - Women's Hammer Throw winner: (Brazil) Gracielly Pereira Pinzan (non GP)
  - Men's Javelin Throw winner: (Paraguay) Víctor Fatecha
  - Women's Shot Put winner: (Paraguay) Ana Camila Pirelli
- May 5: Grand Prix Manuel Consiglieri in (Peru) Lima
  - Men's 200 m winner: (Brazil) Aldemir da Silva Júnior
  - Men's 1,500 m winner: (Argentina) Fabián Manrique
  - Men's 5,000 m winner: (Peru) Jesús Yana Pineda
  - Men's 110 m Hurdles winner: (Brazil) Eduardo de Deus
  - Women's 100 m Hurdles winner: (Venezuela) Génesis Romero
  - Women's 3000 metres steeplechase winner: (Brazil) Tatiane Raquel da Silva
  - High Jump winners: (Venezuela) Eure Yáñez (m) / (Brazil) Eliane Martins (f)
  - Women's Triple Jump winner: (Peru) Silvana Daniela Segura Sánchez
  - Women's 10 km Relay winner: (Peru) Mary Luz Andía
- May 10: Grand Prix Memorial Máximo Viloria in (Venezuela) Barquisimeto
  - 100 m winners: (Venezuela) David Vivas Larua (m) / (Venezuela) Génesis Romero (f)
  - 400 m winners: (Venezuela) Kelvis Jose Padrino Villasana (m) / (Venezuela) Odellanis Monjes (f)
  - Women's Shut Put winner: (Venezuela) Ahymara Espinoza
  - Women's 100 m Hurdles winner: (Venezuela) Génesis Romero

CONSUDATLE Major Events

- February 23: South American Cross Country Championships in Ecuador
  - Winners: (Peru) José Luis Rojas (m) / (Ecuador) Silvia Patricia Ortiz (f)
  - U20 winners: (Colombia) Jagannatha Sánchez (m) / (Peru) Liz Campos (f)
  - U18 winners: (Peru) Guido Bustamante (m) / (Peru) Jhenyfer Melchor (f)
- July 15 & 16: 2019 South American U20 Championships in Athletics in (Colombia) Cali
- August 25: South American Half Marathon Championships in (Paraguay) Asunción
- October 27: South American Road Mile Championships in (Chile) Santiago
