= 2011 IAAF World Challenge =

- Edition: 2nd
- Start date: 3 March
- End date: 13 September
- Meetings: 14

The 2011 IAAF World Challenge was the second edition of the annual, global circuit of one-day track and field competitions organized by the International Association of Athletics Federations (IAAF). The series featured a total of fourteen meetings – one more than the previous year as the Jamaica International Invitational was added to the schedule.

== Schedule ==
Number	Date	Meet	Stadium	City	Country	Events (M+W)
1	Melbourne Track Classic	3 March	Olympic Park Stadium	Melbourne	Australia	
2	Jamaica International Invitational	7 May	Independence Park	Kingston	Jamaica	
3	Golden Grand Prix Kawasaki	8 May	Kawasaki Todoroki Stadium	Kawasaki	Japan	
4	Colorful Daegu Championships Meeting	12 May	Daegu Stadium	Daegu	South Korea	
5	Grande Premio Brasil Caixa de Atletismo	26 May	Estádio Olímpico Nilton Santos	Rio de Janeiro	Brazil	
6	IAAF World Challenge Dakar	28 May	Stade Léopold Sédar Senghor	Dakar	Senegal	
7	Fanny Blankers-Koen Games	29 May	Fanny Blankers-Koen Stadion	Hengelo	Netherlands	
8	Golden Spike Ostrava	31 May	Městský stadion	Ostrava	Czech Republic	
9	Meeting de Rabat	5 June	Prince Moulay Abdellah Stadium	Rabat	Morocco	
10	Brothers Znamensky Memorial	3 July	Meteor Stadium	Zhukovsky	Russia	
11	Meeting de Atletismo Madrid	9 July	Centro Deportivo Municipal Moratalaz	Madrid	Spain	
12	Rieti Meeting	10 September	Stadio Raul Guidobaldi	Rieti	Italy	
13	ISTAF Berlin	11 September	Olympiastadion	Berlin	Germany	
14	Hanžeković Memorial	13 September	Sportski Park Mladost	Zagreb	Croatia	
