= 2013 IAAF World Challenge =

- Edition: 4th
- Start date: 6 April
- End date: 8 September
- Meetings: 15

The 2013 IAAF World Challenge was the fourth edition of the annual, global circuit of one-day track and field competitions organized by the International Association of Athletics Federations (IAAF). The series featured a total of fifteen meetings – one more than the previous year as the IAAF World Challenge Dakar and IAAF World Challenge Beijing meetings were added to the schedule while the Colorful Daegu Championships Meeting was dropped.

== Schedule ==
Number	Date	Meet	Stadium	City	Country	Events (M+W)
1	Melbourne Track Classic	6 April	Lakeside Stadium	Melbourne	Australia	
2	Jamaica International Invitational	4 May	Independence Park	Kingston	Jamaica	
3	Golden Grand Prix Tokyo	5 May	National Stadium	Tokyo	Japan	
4	Grande Premio Brasil Caixa de Atletismo	12 May	Estádio Olímpico do Pará	Belém	Brazil	
5	Ponce Grand Prix de Atletismo	18 May	Estadio Francisco Montaner	Ponce	Puerto Rico	
6	IAAF World Challenge Beijing	21 May	Beijing National Stadium	Beijing	China	
7	Fanny Blankers-Koen Games	8 June	Fanny Blankers-Koen Stadion	Hengelo	Netherlands	
8	Meeting de Rabat	9 June	Prince Moulay Abdellah Stadium	Rabat	Morocco	
9	Moscow Challenge	11 June	Luzhniki Stadium	Moscow	Russia	
10	IAAF World Challenge Dakar	12 June	Stade Léopold Sédar Senghor	Dakar	Senegal	
11	Golden Spike Ostrava	27 June	Městský stadion	Ostrava	Czech Republic	
12	Meeting de Atletismo Madrid	13 July	Centro Deportivo Municipal Moratalaz	Madrid	Spain	
13	ISTAF Berlin	1 September	Olympiastadion	Berlin	Germany	
14	Hanžeković Memorial	3 September	Sportski Park Mladost	Zagreb	Croatia	
15	Rieti Meeting	8 September	Stadio Raul Guidobaldi	Rieti	Italy	
