= 2012 IAAF World Challenge =

- Edition: 3rd
- Start date: 3 March
- End date: 9 September
- Meetings: 14

The 2012 IAAF World Challenge was the third edition of the annual, global circuit of one-day track and field competitions organized by the International Association of Athletics Federations (IAAF). The series featured a total of fourteen meetings – the same number as the previous year as the IAAF World Challenge Dakar and Brothers Znamensky Memorial meetings were dropped to the schedule while the Moscow Challenge and Ponce Grand Prix de Atletismo were added.

== Schedule ==
Number	Date	Meet	Stadium	City	Country	Events (M+W)
1	Melbourne Track Classic	3 March	Lakeside Stadium	Melbourne	Australia	
2	Jamaica International Invitational	5 May	Independence Park	Kingston	Jamaica	
3	Golden Grand Prix Kawasaki	6 May	Kawasaki Todoroki Stadium	Kawasaki	Japan	
4	Ponce Grand Prix de Atletismo	12 May	Estadio Francisco Montaner	Ponce	Puerto Rico	
5	Colorful Daegu Championships Meeting	16 May	Daegu Stadium	Daegu	South Korea	
6	Grande Premio Brasil Caixa de Atletismo	20 May	Estádio Olímpico Nilton Santos	Rio de Janeiro	Brazil	
7	Golden Spike Ostrava	25 May	Městský stadion	Ostrava	Czech Republic	
8	Meeting de Rabat	27 May	Prince Moulay Abdellah Stadium	Rabat	Morocco	
9	Fanny Blankers-Koen Games	27 May	Fanny Blankers-Koen Stadion	Hengelo	Netherlands	
10	Moscow Challenge	11 June	Luzhniki Stadium	Moscow	Russia	
11	Meeting de Atletismo Madrid	7 July	Centro Deportivo Municipal Moratalaz	Madrid	Spain	
12	ISTAF Berlin	2 September	Olympiastadion	Berlin	Germany	
13	Hanžeković Memorial	4 September	Sportski Park Mladost	Zagreb	Croatia	
14	Rieti Meeting	9 September	Stadio Raul Guidobaldi	Rieti	Italy	
