= 2014 IAAF World Challenge =

- Edition: 5th
- Start date: 22 March
- End date: 7 September
- Meetings: 13

The 2014 IAAF World Challenge was the fifth edition of the annual, global circuit of one-day track and field competitions organized by the International Association of Athletics Federations (IAAF). The series featured a total of thirteen meetings as the meeting – both the Moscow Challenge and IAAF World Challenge Dakar were dropped from the programme.

== Schedule ==
Number	Date	Meet	Stadium	City	Country	Events (M+W)
1	Melbourne Track Classic	22 March	Lakeside Stadium	Melbourne	Australia	
2	Jamaica International Invitational	3 May	Independence Park	Kingston	Jamaica	
3	Golden Grand Prix Tokyo	11 May	National Stadium	Tokyo	Japan	
4	Ponce Grand Prix de Atletismo	17 May	Estadio Francisco Montaner	Ponce	Puerto Rico	
5	IAAF World Challenge Beijing	21 May	Beijing National Stadium	Beijing	China	
6	Meeting de Marrakech	8 June	Marrakesh Stadium	Marrakesh	Morocco	
7	Fanny Blankers-Koen Games	8 June	Fanny Blankers-Koen Stadion	Hengelo	Netherlands	
8	Golden Spike Ostrava	17 June	Městský stadion	Ostrava	Czech Republic	
9	Meeting de Atletismo Madrid	19 July	Centro Deportivo Municipal Moratalaz	Madrid	Spain	
10	Grande Premio Brasil Caixa de Atletismo	10 August	Estádio Olímpico do Pará	Belém	Brazil	
11	ISTAF Berlin	31 August	Olympiastadion	Berlin	Germany	
12	Hanžeković Memorial	2 September	Sportski Park Mladost	Zagreb	Croatia	
13	Rieti Meeting	7 September	Stadio Raul Guidobaldi	Rieti	Italy	
