= 2016 IAAF World Challenge =

- Edition: 7th
- Start date: 5 March
- End date: 6 September
- Meetings: 12

The 2016 IAAF World Challenge was the seventh edition of the annual, global circuit of one-day track and field competitions organized by the International Association of Athletics Federations (IAAF). The series featured a total of twelve meetings – one fewer than the previous year as the Ponce Grand Prix de Atletismo and Meeting de Rabat were dropped while the Grande Premio Brasil Caixa de Atletismo returned. The Rieti Meeting was originally scheduled for 11 September, but the meeting folded due to financial issues.

== Schedule ==
Number	Date	Meet	Stadium	City	Country	Events (M+W)
1	Melbourne Track Classic	5 March	Lakeside Stadium	Melbourne	Australia	
2	Jamaica International Invitational	7 May	Independence Park	Kingston	Jamaica	
3	Golden Grand Prix	8 May	Kawasaki Todoroki Stadium	Kawasaki	Japan	
4	IAAF World Challenge Beijing	18 May	Beijing National Stadium	Beijing	China	
5	Golden Spike Ostrava	20 May	Městský stadion	Ostrava	Czech Republic	
6	Fanny Blankers-Koen Games	22 May	Fanny Blankers-Koen Stadion	Hengelo	Netherlands	
7	IAAF World Challenge Dakar	25 May	Stade Léopold Sédar Senghor	Dakar	Senegal	
8	Grande Premio Brasil Caixa de Atletismo	19 June	Arena Caixa	São Bernardo do Campo	Brazil	
9	Meeting de Atletismo Madrid	23 June	Centro Deportivo Municipal Moratalaz	Madrid	Spain	
10	ISTAF Berlin	3 September	Olympiastadion	Berlin	Germany	
11	Hanžeković Memorial	6 September	Sportski Park Mladost	Zagreb	Croatia	
12	Rieti Meeting	11 September	Stadio Raul Guidobaldi	Rieti	Italy	Not held
