= 2015 IAAF World Challenge =

- Edition: 6th
- Start date: 21 March
- End date: 13 September
- Meetings: 13

The 2015 IAAF World Challenge was the sixth edition of the annual, global circuit of one-day track and field competitions organized by the International Association of Athletics Federations (IAAF). The series featured a total of thirteen meetings – the same number as the previous year as the Grande Premio Brasil Caixa de Atletismo was dropped and the IAAF World Challenge Dakar was added to the schedule.

== Schedule ==
Number	Date	Meet	Stadium	City	Country	Events (M+W)
1	Melbourne Track Classic	21 March	Lakeside Stadium	Melbourne	Australia	
2	Jamaica International Invitational	9 May	Independence Park	Kingston	Jamaica	
3	Golden Grand Prix	10 May	Kawasaki Todoroki Stadium	Kawasaki	Japan	
4	IAAF World Challenge Beijing	20 May	Beijing National Stadium	Beijing	China	
5	IAAF World Challenge Dakar	23 May	Stade Léopold Sédar Senghor	Dakar	Senegal	
6	Fanny Blankers-Koen Games	24 May	Fanny Blankers-Koen Stadion	Hengelo	Netherlands	
7	Golden Spike Ostrava	26 May	Městský stadion	Ostrava	Czech Republic	
8	Meeting de Rabat	14 June	Prince Moulay Abdellah Stadium	Rabat	Morocco	
9	Meeting de Atletismo Madrid	11 July	Centro Deportivo Municipal Moratalaz	Madrid	Spain	
10	ISTAF Berlin	6 September	Olympiastadion	Berlin	Germany	
11	Hanžeković Memorial	8 September	Sportski Park Mladost	Zagreb	Croatia	
12	Rieti Meeting	13 September	Stadio Raul Guidobaldi	Rieti	Italy	
