= 2010 IAAF World Challenge =

- Edition: 1st
- Start date: 4 March
- End date: 1 September
- Meetings: 13

The 2010 IAAF World Challenge was the inaugural edition of the annual, global circuit of one-day track and field competitions organized by the International Association of Athletics Federations (IAAF). The series began with a total of thirteen meetings.

It replaced the 2009 IAAF World Athletics Tour. Most of the thirteen meetings had been part of the IAAF Grand Prix circuit the previous year, with the exception of the ISTAF Berlin (which had been part of the 2009 IAAF Golden League) and the Meeting de Rabat and Brothers Znamensky Memorial (which had been Area Permit Meetings).

== Schedule ==
Number	Date	Meet	Stadium	City	Country	Events (M+W)
1	Melbourne Track Classic	4 March	Olympic Park Stadium	Melbourne	Australia	
2	IAAF World Challenge Dakar	24 April	Stade Léopold Sédar Senghor	Dakar	Senegal	
3	Osaka Grand Prix	8 May	Yanmar Stadium Nagai	Osaka	Japan	
4	Colorful Daegu Pre-Championships Meeting	19 May	Daegu Stadium	Daegu	South Korea	
5	Grande Premio Brasil Caixa de Atletismo	23 May	Estádio Olímpico Nilton Santos	Rio de Janeiro	Brazil	
6	Golden Spike Ostrava	27 May	Městský stadion	Ostrava	Czech Republic	
7	Fanny Blankers-Koen Games	30 May	Fanny Blankers-Koen Stadion	Hengelo	Netherlands	
8	Meeting de Rabat	6 June	Prince Moulay Abdellah Stadium	Rabat	Morocco	
9	Brothers Znamensky Memorial	26 June	Meteor Stadium	Zhukovsky	Russia	
10	Meeting de Atletismo Madrid	2 July	Centro Deportivo Municipal Moratalaz	Madrid	Spain	
11	ISTAF Berlin	22 August	Olympiastadion	Berlin	Germany	
12	Rieti Meeting	29 August	Stadio Raul Guidobaldi	Rieti	Italy	
13	Hanžeković Memorial	1 September	Sportski Park Mladost	Zagreb	Croatia	
