= 2017 IAAF World Challenge =

- Edition: 8th
- Start date: 20 May
- End date: 29 August
- Meetings: 9

The 2017 IAAF World Challenge was the eighth edition of the annual, global circuit of one-day track and field competitions organized by the International Association of Athletics Federations (IAAF). The series featured a total of nine meetings – three fewer than the previous year as the Rieti Meeting, Melbourne Track Classic, Meeting Grand Prix IAAF de Dakar and IAAF World Challenge Beijing all dropped out and the only new addition was the Paavo Nurmi Games. The Rieti Meeting was originally scheduled for 3 September, but the meeting folded due to financial issues.

== Schedule ==
Number	Date	Meet	Stadium	City	Country	Events (M+W)
1	Jamaica International Invitational	20 May	Independence Park	Kingston	Jamaica	
2	Golden Grand Prix	21 May	Kawasaki Todoroki Stadium	Kawasaki	Japan	
3	Grande Premio Brasil Caixa de Atletismo	3 June	Arena Caixa	São Bernardo do Campo	Brazil	
4	Fanny Blankers-Koen Games	11 June	Fanny Blankers-Koen Stadion	Hengelo	Netherlands	
5	Paavo Nurmi Games	13 June	Paavo Nurmi Stadium	Turku	Finland	
6	Golden Spike Ostrava	27–28 June	Městský stadion	Ostrava	Czech Republic	
7	Meeting de Atletismo Madrid	14 July	Centro Deportivo Municipal Moratalaz	Madrid	Spain	
8	ISTAF Berlin	27 August	Olympiastadion	Berlin	Germany	
9	Hanžeković Memorial	29 August	Sportski Park Mladost	Zagreb	Croatia	
