= 2019 IAAF World Challenge =

Track and field events

- Edition: 10th
- Start date: 28 April
- End date: 3 September
- Meetings: 8

The 2019 IAAF World Challenge was the tenth edition of the annual IAAF World Challenge, a nine-leg series of track and field meetings. The Jamaica International Invitational was cancelled at the last minute due to financial issues and thus the series this year comprises only eight meetings. The Meeting de Atletismo Madrid was not part of the series for the first time, but was replaced by a new meeting, the Nanjing World Challenge.

== Schedule ==
The following nine meetings were scheduled to be included in the 2019 season:

Number	Date	Meet	Stadium	City	Country	Events (M+W)
1	28 April	Brazil Grand Prix of Athletics	Arena Caixa Atletismo	Bragança Paulista	Brazil	7 + 7 = 14
2	4 May	Jamaica International Invitational	Kingston (National Stadium)	Kingston	Jamaica	7 + 6 = 13
3	19 May	Golden Grand Prix Osaka	Yanmar Stadium Nagai	Osaka	Japan	7 + 6 = 13
4	21 May	Nanjing World Challenge	Nanjing Olympic Sports Centre	Nanjing	China	7 + 6 = 13
5	9 June	Fanny Blankers-Koen Games	Fanny Blankers-Koen Stadion	Hengelo	Netherlands	8 + 5 = 13
6	11 June	Paavo Nurmi Games	Paavo Nurmi Stadium	Turku	Finland	6 + 8 = 14
7	20 June	Golden Spike Ostrava	Mestský Stadion	Ostrava	Czech Republic	7 + 7 = 14
8	1 September	ISTAF Berlin	Olympiastadion	Berlin	Germany	7 + 8 = 15
9	3 September	Hanžeković Memorial	Sportski Park Mladost	Zagreb	Croatia	7 + 6 = 13

== Season overview ==
- Events held at IAAF World Challenge meets, but not included in the IAAF World Challenge points race, are marked in grey background.
- IAAF World Challenge winners are marked with light blue background.

=== Men ===
==== Track ====
#	Meeting	100 m	200 m	400 m	800 m	1500 m	5000 m	110 m h	400 m h	3000 m st
1	Bragança Paulista	-	Bernardo Baloyes (COL); 20.08 SB	-	Alfred Kipketer (KEN); 1:47.16 SB	Michael Kibet (KEN); 3:38.85 SB	-	Gabriel Constantino (BRA); 13.24w	Alison dos Santos (BRA); 48.84 PB	-
2	Kingston	Canceled								
3	Osaka	Justin Gatlin (USA); 10.00 SB	Michael Norman (USA); 19.84 =PB	Vernon Norwood (USA); 45.79	Jonathan Kitilit (KEN); 1:46.37	-	-	Shunsuke Izumiya (JPN); 13.26w	Masaki Toyoda (JPN); 50.38	Philemon Ruto (KEN); 8:22.65 SB
4	Nanjing	Mike Rodgers (USA); 10.09 SB	-	-	Nijel Amos (BOT); 1:44.38	-	-	Orlando Ortega (ESP); 13.27 SB	Takatoshi Abe (JPN); 49.16 SB	Benjamin Kigen (KEN); 8:08.94 SB
5	Hengelo	Arthur Gue Cissé (CIV); 10.05	-	Michael Cherry (USA); 45.15 SB	Cornelius Tuwei (KEN); 1:45.67	-	Telahun Haile (ETH); 12:57.56	Orlando Ortega (ESP); 13.27 =SB	-	-
6	Turku	Mike Rodgers (USA); 10.00 SB	-	-	Cornelius Tuwei (KEN); 1:46.37	-	-	Eduardo de Deus (BRA); 13.42	-	Andy Bayer (USA); 8:18.29
7	Ostrava	Mike Rodgers (USA); 10.04	Andre De Grasse (CAN); 19.91 SB	Steven Gardiner (BAH); 44.95 SB	Amel Tuka (BIH); 1:44.95 SB	Charlie Grice (GBR); 3:56.95 (Mile)	-	-	-	-
8	Berlin	Andre De Grasse (CAN); 9.97 SB	-	-	-	Joshua Thompson (USA); 3:35.01 PB	-	Omar McLeod (JAM); 13.07 SB	Luke Campbell (GER); 49.43	-
9	Zagreb	Mike Rodgers (USA); 10.04	-	-	Amel Tuka (BIH); 1:44.78	-	-	Shane Brathwaite (BAR); 13.47	-	Matt Hughes (CAN); 8:23.42

==== Field ====
#	Meeting	Long jump	Triple jump	High jump	Pole vault	Shot put	Discus	Hammer	Javelin
1	Bragança Paulista	Emiliano Lasa (URU); 8.21w	-	-	Augusto Dutra de Oliveira (BRA); 5.75 SB	Chuk Enekwechi (NGR); 21.77 NR	-	Nick Miller (GBR); 73.81 SB	-
2	Kingston	Canceled							
3	Osaka	Natsuki Yamakawa (JPN); 7.87 SB	Omar Craddock (USA); 17.16	Naoto Tobe (JPN); 2.27 SB	Huang Bokai (CHN); 5.61	-	-	-	Edis Matusevičius (LTU); 84.55 SB
4	Nanjing	Tajay Gayle (JAM); 8.21	Christian Taylor (USA); 17.47 SB	Wang Yu (CHN); 2.31 =WL SB	-	-	-	-	Thomas Röhler (GER); 86.39 SB
5	Hengelo	Luvo Manyonga (RSA); 8.35 =SB	-	-	Sam Kendricks (USA); 5.91 SB	-	-	-	-
6	Turku	Zhang Yaoguang (CHN); 7.87	Zhu Yaming (CHN); 17.36w	-	-	-	Fedrick Dacres (JAM); 66.74	-	Magnus Kirt (EST); 88.32
7	Ostrava	Juan Miguel Echevarría (CUB); 8.32	-	-	Sam Kendricks (USA); 5.93 SB	Tomas Walsh (NZL); 22.27 SB	-	-	Magnus Kirt (EST); 90.34 NR WL PB
8	Berlin	-	-	Mateusz Przybylko (GER); 2.30 =SB	Armand Duplantis (SWE); 5.80	-	Piotr Małachowski (POL); 65.17	-	Johannes Vetter (GER); 85.40
9	Zagreb	Luvo Manyonga (RSA); 8.03	Chris Benard (USA); 16.97 SB	-	-	Tom Walsh (NZL); 21.98	-	-	-

=== Women ===
==== Track ====
#	Meeting	100 m	200 m	400 m	800 m	1500 m	5000 m	100 m h	400 m h	3000 m st
1	Bragança Paulista	-	-	Maggie Barrie (SLE); 52.62 SB	-	-	Daisy Jepkemei (KEN); 8:52.16 WL PB (3,000m)	Andrea Vargas (CRC); 12.78w	Nikita Tracey (JAM); 55.53 SB	-
2	Kingston	Canceled								
3	Osaka	Mikiah Brisco (USA); 11.33 SB	Ivet Lalova-Collio (BUL); 22.55 SB	-	Noélie Yarigo (BEN); 2:03.18 SB	-	-	Sharika Nelvis (USA); 12.70 SB	Dalilah Muhammad (USA); 53.88	Yukari Ishizawa (JPN); 10:12.12
4	Nanjing	-	Elaine Thompson (JAM); 22.40 SB	-	Nelly Jepkosgei (KEN); 1:59.98	Gudaf Tsegay (ETH); 3:59.57 WL SB	-	Brianna McNeal (USA); 12.78 SB	-	-
5	Hengelo	Dafne Schippers (NED); 11.06 SB	-	-	-	-	Margaret Kipkemboi (KEN); 14:37.22 WL	Nia Ali (USA); 12.75 SB	-	-
6	Turku	Crystal Emmanuel (CAN); 11.19 SB	-	-	-	Winnie Nanyondo (UGA); 4:06.21	-	Christina Clemons (USA); 12.85	-	-
7	Ostrava	-	-	Shaunae Miller-Uibo (BAH); 34.41 AR WL PB (300 m)	-	Gudaf Tsegay (ETH); 4:02.95	-	-	-	-
8	Berlin	Ewa Swoboda (POL); 11.07 PB	-	-	-	-	Daisy Jepkemei (KEN); 14:51.72 PB	Tobi Amusan (NGR); 12.51	-	Gesa-Felicitas Krause (GER); 5:52.80 WB WL MR NR PB (2000m st)
9	Zagreb	-	Maja Mihalinec (SLO); 22.88 PB	Phyllis Francis (USA); 51.02	-	Kate Grace (USA); 4:07.91	-	Sharika Nelvis (USA); 12.73	-	-

==== Field ====
#	Meeting	Long jump	Triple jump	High jump	Pole vault	Shot put	Discus	Hammer	Javelin
1	Bragança Paulista	-	-	-	-	Jessica Ramsey (USA); 18.90 SB	Valarie Allman (USA); 65.39	-	-
2	Kingston	Canceled							
3	Osaka	Brooke Stratton (AUS); 6.66	-	-	-	-	-	Wang Zheng (CHN); 75.27	Yu Yuzhen (CHN); 60.88
4	Nanjing	Jazmin Sawyers (GBR); 6.56 SB	-	-	-	Gong Lijiao (CHN); 19.84 WL	-	Wang Zheng (CHN); 75.27	-
5	Hengelo	-	-	Erika Kinsey (SWE); 1.96 SB	-	-	-	-	-
6	Turku	-	Gabriela Petrova (BUL); 14.29w	-	Alysha Newman (CAN); 4.62	Chase Ealey (USA); 19.38	-	Anita Włodarczyk (POL); 75.61 SB	-
7	Ostrava	-	-	Mariya Lasitskene (ANA); 2.06 WL =PB	-	-	-	Wang Zheng (CHN); 75.80 SB	Sara Kolak (CRO); 64.45 SB
8	Berlin	Malaika Mihambo (GER); 6.99	Shanieka Ricketts (JAM); 14.63	-	-	Brittany Crew (CAN); 19.28 NR PB	-	-	-
9	Zagreb	-	-	-	-	-	Sandra Perković (CRO); 67.78	-	Sara Kolak (CRO); 66.42 SB
