= 2018 IAAF World Challenge =

- Edition: 9th
- Start date: 19 May
- End date: 4 September
- Meetings: 9

The 2018 IAAF World Challenge was the ninth edition of the annual, global circuit of one-day track and field competitions organized by the International Association of Athletics Federations (IAAF). The series featured a total of nine meetings, with the meetings remaining unchanged from the previous year. The host venue of the Brazilian leg of the series moved from São Bernardo do Campo to Bragança Paulista.

== Schedule ==
Number	Date	Meet	Stadium	City	Country	Events (M+W)
1	Jamaica International Invitational	19 May	Independence Park	Kingston	Jamaica	
2	Golden Grand Prix Osaka	20 May	Kawasaki Todoroki Stadium	Kawasaki	Japan	
3	Fanny Blankers-Koen Games	3 June	Fanny Blankers-Koen Stadion	Hengelo	Netherlands	
4	Paavo Nurmi Games	5 June	Paavo Nurmi Stadium	Turku	Finland	
5	Golden Spike Ostrava	13 June	Městský stadion	Ostrava	Czech Republic	
5	Meeting de Atletismo Madrid	22 June	Centro Deportivo Municipal Moratalaz	Madrid	Spain	
3	Grande Premio Brasil Caixa de Atletismo	8 July	Bragança Paulista National Training Centre	Bragança Paulista	Brazil	
8	ISTAF Berlin	2 September	Olympiastadion	Berlin	Germany	
9	Hanžeković Memorial	3–4 September	Sportski Park Mladost	Zagreb	Croatia	
