= List of track and field stadiums by capacity =

This list contains stadiums with at least a 45,000 capacity that include facilities for athletics events.

== Athletics stadiums with a capacity of 45,000 or higher ==
1	Rungrado 1st of May Stadium	113,281	Pyongyang	North Korea	Futebol, Arirang Festival and Mass Games	Association football	
2	Bukit Jalil National Stadium	87,411	Kuala Lumpur	Malaysia	1998 Commonwealth Games, 2001 Southeast Asian Games, 2017 Southeast Asian Games, 2017 ASEAN Para Games	Association football	
3	Guangdong Olympic Stadium	80,012	Guangzhou	China	2001 National Games of China, 2009 Asian Championships, 2010 Asian Games, 2010 Asian Para Games	Association football	
4	Beijing National Stadium	80,000	Beijing	China	IAAF World Challenge (IAAF World Challenge Beijing), 2008 Summer Olympics, 2008 Summer Paralympics, 2015 World Championships, 2027 World Athletics Championships	Association football	
5	National Sports Stadium	80,000	Harare	Zimbabwe		Association football	
6	Azadi Stadium	78,166	Tehran	Iran	1974 Asian Games	Association football	
7	Gelora Bung Karno Stadium	77,193	Jakarta	Indonesia	1962 Asian Games, 1985, 1995, and 2000 Asian Athletics Championships, 2018 Asian Games, 2018 Asian Para Games	Association football	
8	Atatürk Olympic Stadium	76,092	Istanbul	Turkey		Association football	
9	Naghsh-e Jahan Stadium	75,000	Isfahan	Iran		Association football	
10	Cairo International Stadium	75,000	Cairo	Egypt	1991 All-Africa Games	Association football	
11	Stade de France	69,000	Saint-Denis	France	IAAF Diamond League (Meeting de Paris; 1999-2016), 2003 World Championships, 2024 Summer Olympics, 2024 Summer Paralympics	Association football, rugby union, rugby league	
12	Olympiastadion	71,000	Berlin	Germany	IAAF World Challenge (ISTAF Berlin), 1936 Summer Olympics, 2009 World Championships, 2018 European Championships	Association football	
13	International Stadium Yokohama	72,237	Yokohama	Japan	2019 IAAF World Relays	Association football, rugby union	
14	Stadio Olimpico	67,585	Rome	Italy	IAAF Diamond League (Golden Gala), 1960 Summer Olympics, 1974, 2024 European Championships, 1975 Summer Universiade, 1987 World Championships, 2001 Summer Deaflympics	Association football	
15	Olimpiyskiy National Sports Complex	70,050	Kyiv	Ukraine		Association football	
16	Seoul Olympic Stadium	60,000	Seoul	South Korea	1986 Asian Games, 1988 Summer Olympics, 1988 Summer Paralympics	Association football	
17	Athens Olympic Stadium	69,618	Athens	Greece	1982 European Championships, 1997 World Championships, 2004 Summer Olympics, 2004 Summer Paralympics,	Association football	
18	Olympiastadion	63,118	Munich	Germany	1972 Summer Olympics, 1999 IAAF Grand Prix Final, 2002, 2022 European Championships	Association football	
19	Estadio Olímpico Universitario	68,954	Mexico City	Mexico	1954 Central American and Caribbean Games, 1955 Pan American Games, 1968 Summer Olympics, 1975 Pan American Games, 1979 Summer Universiade, 1990 Central American and Caribbean Games	Association football	
20	Yadegar-e Emam Stadium	68,833	Tabriz	Iran		Association football	
21	Baku Olympic Stadium	68,700	Baku	Azerbaijan	2015 European Games, 2017 Islamic Solidarity Games	Association football	
22	Salt Lake Stadium	68,000	Kolkata	India	1987 South Asian Games	Association football	
23	Japan National Stadium	68,000	Tokyo	Japan	2020 Summer Olympics, 2020 Summer Paralympics	Association football, rugby union	
24	Daegu Stadium	66,422	Daegu	South Korea	2003 Summer Universiade, 2011 World Championships	Association football	
25	Basra International Stadium	65,227	Basra	Iraq		Association football	
26	Tripoli Stadium	45,000	Tripoli	Libya		Association football	
27	Stade du 5 Juillet	64,000	Algiers	Algeria	1975 Mediterranean Games, 1978 All-Africa Games, 2000 African Championships in Athletics, 2004 Pan Arab Games, 2007 All-Africa Games, 2018 African Youth Games	Association football	
28	Shanxi Sports Centre Stadium	62,000	Taiyuan	China	2019 China National Youth Games	Association football	
29	Nanjing Olympic Sports Center	61,443	Nanjing	China	IAAF World Challenge (Nanjing World Challenge), 2005 National Games of China, 2014 Summer Youth Olympics	Association football	
30	Dalian Sports Centre Stadium	61,000	Dalian	China		Association football	
31	Moshood Abiola National Stadium	60,491	Abuja	Nigeria	2003 All-Africa Games	Association football	
32	Shenzhen Universiade Sports Centre	60,334	Shenzhen	China	2011 Summer Universiade	Association football	
33	Jawaharlal Nehru Stadium	58,000	Delhi	India	1982 Asian Games, 2010 Commonwealth Games	Association football	
34	Stade Olympique Hammadi Agrebi	60,000	Radès	Tunisia	2001 Mediterranean Games	Association football	
35	National Heroes Stadium	50,000	Lusaka	Zambia		Association football	
36	Jaber Al-Ahmad International Stadium	60,000	Kuwait City	Kuwait		Association football	
37	Shenyang Olympic Sports Centre Stadium	60,000	Shenyang	China	2013 National Games of China	Association football	
38	Hefei Olympic Sports Center Stadium	60,000	Hefei	China		Association football	
39	Guangxi Sports Center	60,000	Nanning	China		Association football	
40	Chongqing Olympic Sports Center	58,860	Chongqing	China		Association football	
41	Stadio San Nicola	58,270	Bari	Italy	1997 Mediterranean Games	Association football	
42	Estadio Mario Alberto Kempes	57,000	Córdoba	Argentina		Association football	
43	Jinan Olympic Sports Center Stadium	56,808	Jinan	China	2009 National Games of China	Association football	
44	Estadi Olímpic Lluís Companys	55,926	Barcelona	Spain	1955 Mediterranean Games, 1998 IAAF World Cup, 1992 Summer Olympics, 1992 Summer Paralympics, 2010 European Athletics Championships, 2012 World Junior Championships in Athletics	Association football	
45	Stadion Śląski	55,211	Chorzów	Poland	2021 World Athletics Relays, 2021 European Athletics Team Championships Super League, 2028 European Athletics Championships	Association football	
46	Kasarani Stadium	55,000	Nairobi	Kenya	1987 All-Africa Games, 2017 IAAF World U18 Championships, 2029 World Athletics Championships	Association football	
47	Kaohsiung National Stadium	55,000	Kaohsiung	Taiwan	2009 World Games	Association football	
48	Helong Sports Center Stadium	55,000	Changsha	China			
49	Tianhe Stadium	54,856	Guangzhou	China	1987 National Games of China	Association football	
50	Tianjin Olympic Center	54,696	Tianjin	China	2017 National Games of China	Association football	
51	Boris Paichadze Stadium	54,549	Tbilisi	Georgia		Association football, rugby union	
52	Wuhan Sports Center Stadium	54,000	Wuhan	China	2015 Asian Athletics Championships,	Association football	
53	Mangueirão	53,635	Belém	Brazil	2002 South American Games, 2002, 2003, 2004, 2005, 2006, 2007, 2008, 2009, 2013, and 2014 Brazilian Athletics Gran Prix	Association football	
54	Aleppo International Stadium	53,200	Aleppo	Syria		Association football	
55	Rajko Mitić Stadium	53,000	Belgrade	Serbia		Association football	
56	Yellow Dragon Sports Center	52,672	Hangzhou	China		Association football	
57	Franklin Field	52,593	Philadelphia	United States	Liberty Bell Classic, Penn Relays	American football	
58	Guiyang Olympic Sports Center	51,638	Guiyang	China		Association football	
59	Hohhot City Stadium	51,632	Hohhot	China		Association football	
60	Shizuoka Stadium	50,889	Fukuroi	Japan		Association football, rugby union	
61	Ernst Happel Stadion	50,865	Vienna	Austria	1938 European Championships	Association football	
62	King Baudouin Stadium	50,024	Brussels	Belgium	IAAF Diamond League (Memorial Van Damme), 1950 European Championships	Association football	
63	Singapore National Stadium	50,000	Singapore	Singapore	2015 Southeast Asian Games, 2015 ASEAN Para Games	Associention football, Cricket, rugby sevens	
64	Nagai Stadium	47,000	Osaka	Japan	2007 World Championships	Association football	
65	Jiangxi Olympic Sports Center	50,000	Nanchang	China		Association football	
66	Xinjiang Sports Centre	48,000	Ürümqi	China		Association football	
67	Khalifa International Stadium	45,000	Doha	Qatar	IAAF Diamond League (Qatar Athletic Super Grand Prix), 2006 Asian Games, 2019 Asian Championships, 2019 World Championships	Association football	
68	Pars Shiraz Stadium	50,000	Shiraz	Iran		Association football	
69	Rajamangala National Stadium	49,722	Bangkok	Thailand	2025 Southeast Asian Games		Association football
70	Camille Chamoun Sports City Stadium	49,500	Beirut	Lebanon		Association football	
71	Miyagi Stadium	49,133	Rifu	Japan		Association football	
72	Incheon Munhak Stadium	49,084	Incheon	South Korea		Association football	
73	Nilton Santos Olympic Stadium	46,931	Rio de Janeiro	Brazil	2007 Pan American Games, 2007 Parapan American Games, 2010, 2011 and 2012 Brazilian Athletics Gran Prix, 2011 Military World Games, 2016 Summer Olympics, 2016 Summer Paralympics	Association football	
74	Stade Mohammed V	45,891	Casablanca	Morocco	1983 Mediterranean Games	Association football	
75	Gelora Bung Tomo Stadium	45,000	Surabaya	Indonesia		Association football	
76	Tuanku Abdul Rahman Stadium	45,000	Seremban	Malaysia		Association football	
77	Kobe Universiade Memorial Stadium	45,000	Kobe	Japan	1985 Summer Universiade	Association football	

== See also ==
- List of sports venues by capacity
- List of stadiums
- List of future stadiums
