= Meeting International Mohammed VI d'Athlétisme de Rabat =

Annual athletics event in Rabat, Morocco

- Date: May – July
- Location: Rabat, Morocco
- Event type: Track and field
- World Athletics Cat.: GW
- Established: 14 June 2008; 18 years ago
- Website: Diamond League Rabat/Marrakech
- 2026 Meeting International Mohammed VI d'Athlétisme de Rabat

The Meeting International Mohammed VI d'Athlétisme de Rabat is an annual track and field competition at the Rabat Olympic Stadium in Rabat, Morocco as part of the IAAF World Challenge Meetings. It was first organized in 2008, and in 2014 and 2024 it was instead held in Marrakesh Stadium in Marrakesh. Its name honours Mohammed VI of Morocco, the present king of Morocco. In 2016 the meeting replaces Adidas Grand Prix in New York for the 2016 IAAF Diamond League season.

== Editions ==
Editions of Meeting International Mohammed VI d'Athlétisme de Rabat
| Ed. | Meeting | Series | Date | Ref. |
|---|---|---|---|---|
| 1st | 2008 Meeting International Mohammed VI d'Athlétisme de Rabat | | 14 Jun 2008 | |
| 2nd | 2009 Meeting International Mohammed VI d'Athlétisme de Rabat | 2009 IAAF Super Grand Prix | 23 May 2009 | |
| 3rd | 2010 Meeting International Mohammed VI d'Athlétisme de Rabat | 2010 IAAF World Challenge | 6 Jun 2010 | |
| 4th | 2011 Meeting International Mohammed VI d'Athlétisme de Rabat | 2011 IAAF World Challenge | 5 Jun 2011 | |
| 5th | 2012 Meeting International Mohammed VI d'Athlétisme de Rabat | 2012 IAAF World Challenge | 27 May 2012 | |
| 6th | 2013 Meeting International Mohammed VI d'Athlétisme de Rabat | 2013 IAAF World Challenge | 9 Jun 2013 | |
| 7th | 2014 Meeting International Mohammed VI d'Athlétisme de Rabat | 2014 IAAF World Challenge | 8 Jun 2014 | |
| 8th | 2015 Meeting International Mohammed VI d'Athlétisme de Rabat | 2015 IAAF World Challenge | 14 Jun 2015 | |
| 9th | 2016 Meeting International Mohammed VI d'Athlétisme de Rabat | 2016 Diamond League | 22 May 2016 | |
| 10th | 2017 Meeting International Mohammed VI d'Athlétisme de Rabat | 2017 Diamond League | 16 Jul 2017 | |
| 11th | 2018 Meeting International Mohammed VI d'Athlétisme de Rabat | 2018 Diamond League | 13 Jul 2018 | |
| 12th | 2019 Meeting International Mohammed VI d'Athlétisme de Rabat | 2019 Diamond League | 16 Jun 2019 | |
| 13th | 2022 Meeting International Mohammed VI d'Athlétisme de Rabat | 2022 Diamond League | 5 Jun 2022 | |
| 14th | 2023 Meeting International Mohammed VI d'Athlétisme de Rabat | 2023 Diamond League | 28 May 2023 | |
| 15th | 2024 Meeting International Mohammed VI d'Athlétisme de Rabat | 2024 Diamond League | 19 May 2024 | |
| 16th | 2025 Meeting International Mohammed VI d'Athlétisme de Rabat | 2025 Diamond League | 25 May 2025 | |
| 17th | 2026 Meeting International Mohammed VI d'Athlétisme de Rabat | 2026 Diamond League | 31 May 2026 | |

== Meeting records ==
=== Men ===
Men's meeting records of Meeting International Mohammed VI d'Athlétisme de Rabat
| Event | Record | Athlete | Nationality | Date | Meet | Ref. |
|---|---|---|---|---|---|---|
| 100 m | 9.94 (+0.1 m/s) | Fred Kerley | United States | 28 May 2023 | 2023 | |
| 200 m | 19.69 (+0.3 m/s) | Kenny Bednarek | United States | 31 May 2026 | 2026 | |
| 400 m | 44.11 | Jacory Patterson | United States | 31 May 2026 | 2026 | |
| 800 m | 1:42.70 | Tshepiso Masalela | Botswana | 25 May 2025 | 2025 | |
| 1000 m | 2:15.31 | Amine Laâlou | Morocco | 5 June 2011 | 2011 | |
| 1500 m | 3:30.35 | Yared Nuguse | United States | 31 May 2026 | 2026 | |
| 3000 m | 7:32.93 | Yomif Kejelcha | Ethiopia | 13 July 2018 | 2018 | |
| 5000 m | 12:59.28 | Vincent Kiprop Chepkok | Kenya | 27 May 2012 | 2012 | |
| 110 m hurdles | 13.08 (−1.3 m/s) | Rasheed Broadbell | Jamaica | 28 May 2023 | 2023 | |
| 400 m hurdles | 48.25 | Khallifah Rosser | United States | 5 June 2022 | 2022 | |
| 3000 m steeplechase | 7:56.68 | Soufiane El Bakkali | Morocco | 28 May 2023 | 2023 | |
| High jump | 2.39 m | Bohdan Bondarenko | Ukraine | 8 June 2014 | 2014 | |
| Pole vault | 5.86 m | Sam Kendricks | United States | 13 July 2018 | 2018 | |
| Long jump | 8.38 m (+0.6 m/s) | Yahya Berrabah | Morocco | 23 May 2009 | 2009 | |
| Long jump | 8.38 m (+0.8 m/s) | Rushwal Samaai | South Africa | 22 May 2016 | 2016 | |
| Triple jump | 17.10 m (−0.4 m/s) | Lázaro Martínez | Cuba | 19 May 2024 | 2024 | |
| Shot put | 22.58 m | Joe Kovacs | United States | 31 May 2026 | 2026 | |
| Discus throw | 70.78 m | Fedrick Dacres | Jamaica | 16 June 2019 | 2019 | |
| Hammer throw | 79.90 m | Paweł Fajdek | Poland | 14 June 2015 | 2015 | |
| Javelin throw | 89.75 m | Magnus Kirt | Estonia | 13 July 2018 | 2018 | |

=== Women ===
Women's meeting records of Meeting International Mohammed VI d'Athlétisme de Rabat
| Event | Record | Athlete | Nationality | Date | Meet | Ref. |
|---|---|---|---|---|---|---|
| 100 m | 10.83 (+0.3 m/s) | Elaine Thompson-Herah | Jamaica | 5 June 2022 | 2022 | |
| 200 m | 21.98 (+0.8 m/s) | Shericka Jackson | Jamaica | 28 May 2023 | 2023 | |
| 400 m | 49.80 | Shaunae Miller-Uibo | Bahamas | 16 July 2017 | 2017 | |
| 800 m | 1:56.56 | Audrey Werro | Switzerland | 31 May 2026 | 2026 | |
| 1000 m | 2:31.01 | Caster Semenya | South Africa | 13 July 2018 | 2018 | |
| 1500 m | 3:54.03 | Gudaf Tsegay | Ethiopia | 28 May 2023 | 2023 | |
| 3000 m | 8:11.56 | Beatrice Chebet | Kenya | 25 May 2025 | 2025 | |
| 5000 m | 14:16.31 | Almaz Ayana | Ethiopia | 22 May 2016 | 2016 | |
| 100 m hurdles | 12.28 (+1.2 m/s) | Tobi Amusan | Nigeria | 31 May 2026 | 2026 | |
| 400 m hurdles | 52.46 | Femke Bol | Nederland | 25 May 2025 | 2025 | |
| 3000 m steeplechase | 9:16.14 | Hiwot Ayalew | Ethiopia | 27 May 2012 | 2012 | |
| High jump | 2.01 m | Yaroslava Mahuchikh | Ukraine | 28 May 2023 | 2023 | |
| Pole vault | 4.82 m | Sandi Morris | United States | 16 June 2019 | 2019 | |
| Long jump | 6.93 m (+0.2 m/s) | Tianna Bartoletta | United States | 8 June 2014 | 2014 | |
| Triple jump | 14.96 m (+0.1 m/s) | Caterine Ibarguen | Colombia | 13 July 2018 | 2018 | |
| Shot put | 20.00 m | Chase Jackson | United States | 19 May 2024 | 2024 | |
| Discus throw | 68.75 m | Valarie Sion | United States | 31 May 2026 | 2026 | |
| Hammer throw | 73.30 m | Kathrin Klaas | Germany | 8 June 2014 | 2014 | |
| Javelin throw | 64.76 m | Madara Palameika | Latvia | 22 May 2016 | 2016 | |
