= IAAF World Challenge =

International track and field competition

- Sport: Track and field
- Founded: 2010
- Ceased: 2019
- Continent: global
- Official website: IAAF World Challenge

The IAAF World Challenge was an annual, global circuit of one-day track and field competitions organized by the International Association of Athletics Federations (IAAF). First held in 2010, it replaced the IAAF Grand Prix and IAAF Super Grand Prix series to form the second tier of international one-day meetings, after the IAAF Diamond League. Unlike the Diamond League, the IAAF World Challenge comprised stand-alone meetings, and no overall winners are crowned. The series was made defunct at the end of 2019 and was replaced by the World Athletics Continental Tour, which includes series winners for non-Diamond League events.

== Editions ==
| Edition | Year | Start date | End date | Meets | Ref. |
|---|---|---|---|---|---|
| 1 | 2010 | 4 March | 1 September | 13 | |
| 2 | 2011 | 3 March | 13 September | 14 | |
| 3 | 2012 | 3 March | 9 September | 14 | |
| 4 | 2013 | 6 April | 8 September | 15 | |
| 5 | 2014 | 22 March | 7 September | 13 | |
| 6 | 2015 | 21 March | 13 September | 13 | |
| 7 | 2016 | 5 March | 6 September | 12 | |
| 8 | 2017 | 20 May | 29 August | 9 | |
| 9 | 2018 | 19 May | 4 September | 9 | |
| 10 | 2019 | 28 April | 3 September | 9 | |

- The Rieti Meeting was included in the original series schedule in 2016, but was later cancelled

== Meetings ==
| Meeting | City | Country | 2010 | 2011 | 2012 | 2013 | 2014 | 2015 | 2016 | 2017 | 2018 | 2019 | Years |
|---|---|---|---|---|---|---|---|---|---|---|---|---|---|
| Golden Spike Ostrava | Ostrava | Czech Republic | X | X | X | X | X | X | X | X | X | X | 10 |
| Fanny Blankers-Koen Games | Hengelo | Netherlands | X | X | X | X | X | X | X | X | X | X | 10 |
| ISTAF Berlin | Berlin | Germany | X | X | X | X | X | X | X | X | X | X | 10 |
| Hanžeković Memorial | Zagreb | Croatia | X | X | X | X | X | X | X | X | X | X | 10 |
| Meeting de Atletismo Madrid | Madrid | Spain | X | X | X | X | X | X | X | X | X | — | 9 |
| Grande Premio Brasil Caixa de Atletismo | Belém | Brazil | X | X | X | X | X | — | X | X | X | X | 9 |
| Golden Grand Prix | Kawasaki | Japan | — | X | X | X | X | X | X | X | X | X | 9 |
| Jamaica International Invitational | Kingston | Jamaica | — | X | X | X | X | X | X | X | X | X | 9 |
| Rieti Meeting | Rieti | Italy | X | X | X | X | X | X | X | — | — | — | 7 |
| Melbourne Track Classic | Melbourne | Australia | X | X | X | X | X | X | X | — | — | — | 7 |
| Meeting de Rabat | Rabat | Morocco | X | X | X | X | X | X | — | — | — | — | 6 |
| Ponce Grand Prix de Atletismo | Ponce | Puerto Rico | — | — | X | X | X | X | — | — | — | — | 6 |
| IAAF World Challenge Dakar | Dakar | Senegal | X | X | — | X | — | X | X | — | — | — | 5 |
| IAAF World Challenge Beijing | Beijing | China | — | — | — | X | X | X | X | — | — | — | 4 |
| Paavo Nurmi Games | Turku | Finland | — | — | — | — | — | — | — | X | X | X | 3 |
| Colorful Daegu Championships Meeting | Daegu | South Korea | X | X | X | — | — | — | — | — | — | — | 3 |
| Moscow Challenge | Moscow | Russia | — | — | X | X | — | — | — | — | — | — | 2 |
| Brothers Znamensky Memorial | Zhukovsky | Russia | X | X | — | — | — | — | — | — | — | — | 2 |
| Osaka Grand Prix | Osaka | Japan | X | — | — | — | — | — | — | — | — | — | 1 |
| Nanjing World Challenge | Nanjing | China | — | — | — | — | — | — | — | — | — | X | 1 |

== Series records ==
=== Men ===
| Event | Record | Name | Date | Place | Ref. |
|---|---|---|---|---|---|
| 100 m | 9.78 (+0.9 m/s) | Nesta Carter (JAM) | 2010 | Rieti | |
| 200 m | 19.77 (+0.0 m/s) | Isaac Makwala (BOT) | 2017 | Madrid | |
| 300 m | 30.81 | Wayde van Niekerk (RSA) | 2017 | Ostrava | |
| 400 m | 44.16 | LaShawn Merritt (USA) | 2014 | Ostrava | |
| 800 m | 1:41.01 | David Rudisha (KEN) | 2010 | Rieti | |
| 1500 m | 3:29.90 | Nixon Chepseba (KEN) | 2012 | Hengelo | |
| Mile | 3:56.95 | Charlie Grice (GBR) | 20 June 2019 | Ostrava | |
| 3000 m | 7:28.70 | Tariku Bekele (ETH) | 2010 | Rieti | |
| 5000 m | 12:57.56 | Telahun Haile Bekele (ETH) | 2019 | Hengelo | |
| 110 m hurdles | 12.97 (+1.2 m/s) | Aries Merritt (USA) | 2012 | Berlin | |
| 400 m hurdles | 47.66 | L. J. van Zyl (RSA) | 2011 | Ostrava | |
| 3000 m steeplechase | 8:02.55 | Paul Kipsiele Koech (KEN) | 2011 | Ostrava | |
| High jump | 2.40 m | Bohdan Bondarenko (UKR) | 2014 | Tokyo | |
| Pole vault | 5.92 m | Renaud Lavillenie (FRA) | 2013 | Ostrava | |
| Long jump | 8.66 m (+1.0 m/s) | Juan Miguel Echevarría (CUB) | 13 June 2018 | Ostrava | |
| Triple jump | 17.57 m (−1.1 m/s) | Christian Taylor (USA) | 2017 | Ostrava | |
| Shot put | 22.28 m | Ryan Crouser (USA) | 2016 | Zagreb | |
| Discus throw | 71.84 m | Piotr Małachowski (POL) | 2013 | Hengelo | |
| Hammer throw | 83.44 m | Paweł Fajdek (POL) | 2017 | Ostrava | |
| Javelin throw | 91.28 m | Thomas Röhler (GER) | 2016 | Turku | |

=== Women ===
| Event | Record | Name | Date | Place | Ref. |
|---|---|---|---|---|---|
| 100 m | 10.76 (+1.1 m/s) | Veronica Campbell-Brown (JAM) | 2011 | Ostrava | |
| 200 m | 22.02 (−0.3 m/s) | Dafne Schippers (NED) | 2016 | Hengelo | |
| 300 m | 34.41 | Shaunae Miller-Uibo (BAH) | 2019 | Ostrava | |
| 400 m | 49.95 | Sanya Richards-Ross (USA) | 2015 | Kingston | |
| 800 m | 1:55.68 | Caster Semenya (RSA) | 2016 | Berlin | |
| 1500 m | 3:56.14 | Sifan Hassan (NED) | 2017 | Hengelo | |
| Mile | 4:22.45 | Marta Pen (POR) | 2018 | Berlin | |
| 3000 m | 8:22.22 | Almaz Ayana (ETH) | 2015 | Rabat | |
| 5000 m | 14:37.22 | Margaret Chelimo Kipkemboi (KEN) | 9 June 2019 | Hengelo | |
| 100 m hurdles | 12.39 (+2.0 m/s) | Jasmin Stowers (USA) | 2015 | Kingston | |
| 400 m hurdles | 53.32 | Zuzana Hejnová (CZE) | 2013 | Ostrava | |
| 2000 m steeplechase | 5:52.80 | Gesa-Felicitas Krause (GER) | 1 September 2019 | Berlin | |
| 3000 m steeplechase | 9:03.70 | Norah Jeruto (KEN) | 2017 | Berlin | |
| High jump | 2.06 m | Mariya Lasitskene (RUS) | 20 June 2019 | Ostrava | |
| Pole vault | 4.90 m | Yarisley Silva (CUB) | 2013 | Hengelo | |
| Long jump | 6.96 m (+1.1 m/s) | Ivana Španović (SRB) | 2016 | Zagreb | |
| Triple jump | 15.02 m (−0.4 m/s) | Yulimar Rojas (VEN) | 2016 | Madrid | |
| Shot put | 20.88 m | Valerie Adams (NZL) | 2013 | Ostrava | |
| Discus throw | 70.83 m | Sandra Perković (CRO) | 2017 | Zagreb | |
| Hammer throw | 79.72 m | Anita Włodarczyk (POL) | 2017 | Ostrava | |
| Javelin throw | 70.53 m | Mariya Abakumova (RUS) | 2013 | Berlin | |
