= Brothers Znamensky Memorial =

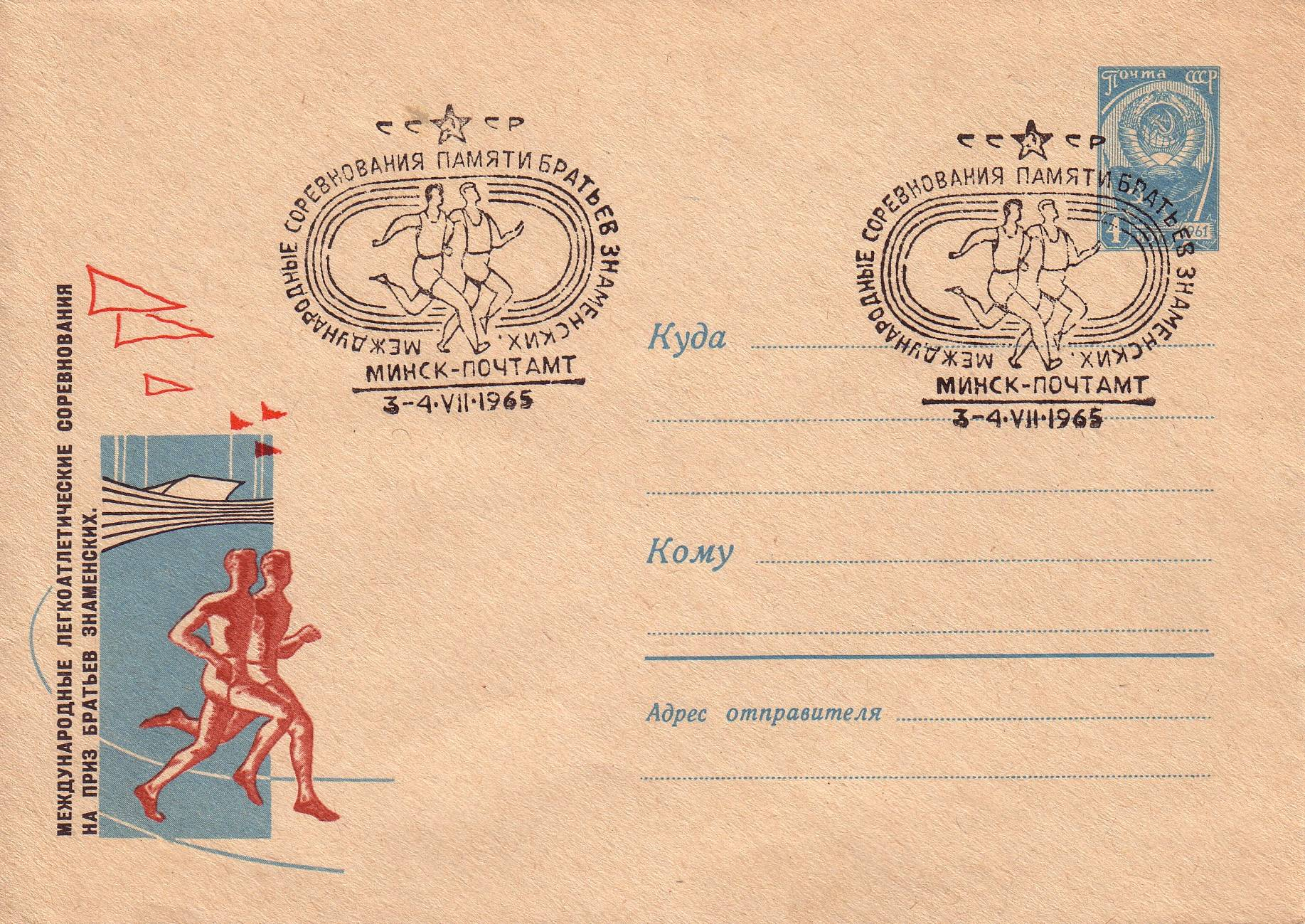
- 1965 Soviet postal envelope dedicated to the Brothers Znamensky Memorial
- Date: Late June/Early July
- Location: Zhukovsky, Russia
- Event type: Track and field
- Established: 1949 (1958)

The Brothers Znamensky Memorial (Мемориал братьев Знаменских) is an annual track and field competition which is held at the Meteor Stadium in Zhukovsky, Russia.

The event is held in memory of Seraphim and Georgy Znamensky, the 1930s Soviet champions in long-distance running who died in 1942 and 1946, respectively. It was established in 1949, and received an international status in 1958, as only Soviet (Russian) athletes competed in 1949–1950 and 1998, and there was a break in the event between 1950 and 1958.

Each edition features memorial races over distances from 1500 metres to 10,000 metres. The event has attracted many high-profile runners throughout the decades, from Gaston Roelants and Pyotr Bolotnikov to Kip Keino and Evgeni Ignatov, through to Noureddine Morceli and Daniel Komen. The memorial is a highly international competition: athletes from over 50 countries have reached the podium at the Brothers Znamensky meet. The meeting typically features ten events for national level competitors and sixteen events with international fields.

The meeting has held an IAAF status from 2000 onwards. Initially it was part of the IAAF Grand Prix circuit, then became part of the IAAF World Athletics Tour and the IAAF World Challenge Meetings until 2011 when it was replaced by the Moscow Challenge. Currently it is one of the European Athletics Outdoor Classic Meetings. The competition was previously held at various locations in Russia, but following the completion of the Meteor Stadium the event became an annual fixture in Zhukovsky. The current meeting director is Mikhail Butov.

== Meeting records ==
=== Men ===
Men's meeting records of the Brothers Znamensky Memorial
Event	Record	Athlete	Nationality	Date	Ref.
100 m	10.03	Viktor Bryzhin	Soviet Union	1986	
100 m	10.03	Olapade Adeniken	Nigeria	1996	
200 m	20.20	Robson Caetano da Silva	Brazil	1987	
400 m	45.04	Donald Sanford	Israel	19 July 2015	
800 m	1:43.76	Amine Laalou	Morocco	2010	
1500 m	3:33.22	Noureddine Morceli	Algeria	1996	
3000 m	7:37.67	Daniel Komen	Kenya	1997	
5000 m	13:17.48	Leonard Patrick Komon	Kenya	2008	
10,000 m	27:58.35	Wodajo Bulti	Ethiopia	1988	
110 m hurdles	13.20	Aleksandr Markin	Soviet Union	1988	
400 m hurdles	48.08	Derrick Adkins	United States	1995	
3000 m steeplechase	8:10.59	Roba Gary	Ethiopia	2010	
High jump	2.33 m	Andrey Silnov	Russia	2010	
Pole vault	5.91 m	Yevgeniy Lukyanenko	Russia	2008	
Long jump	8.40 m	Jaime Jefferson	Cuba	1987	
Long jump	8.40 m	Robert Emmiyan	Soviet Union	1987	
Triple jump	17.78 m	Nikolay Musiyenko	Soviet Union	1986	
Shot put	21.79 m	Sergey Smirnov	Soviet Union	1986	
Discus throw	68.06 m	Lars Riedel	Germany	1995	
Hammer throw	84.58 m	Yuriy Sedykh	Soviet Union	1986	
Javelin throw	88.90 m	Alexandr Ivanov	Russia	2003	

=== Women ===
Women's meeting records of the Brothers Znamensky Memorial
Event	Record	Athlete	Nationality	Date	Ref.
60 m	7.13 (−0.6 m/s)	Liranyi Alonso	Dominican Republic	6 June 2026	
100 m	10.92	Anelia Nuneva	Bulgaria	1987	
100 m	10.92	Merlene Ottey	Jamaica	1996	
200 m	22.45	Natalya Bochina	Soviet Union	1980	
400 m	49.79	Aelita Yurchenko	Soviet Union	1988	
800 m	1:55.10	Olga Mineyeva	Soviet Union	1980	
1500 m	3:55.00	Tatyana Kazankina	Soviet Union	1980	
3000 m	8:34.35	Tatyana Pozdnyakova	Soviet Union	1984	
5000 m	15:12.62	Irina Bondarchuk	Soviet Union	1982	
10,000 m	31:56.66	Svetlana Guskova	Soviet Union	1986	
100 m hurdles	12.48	Nataliya Grygoryeva	Soviet Union	1988	
400 m hurdles	53.10	Yuliya Pechenkina	Russia	2002	
3000 m steeplechase	9:14.37	Gulnara Galkina-Samitova	Russia	2007	
High jump	2.03 m	Blanka Vlašić	Croatia	2008	
Pole vault	4.50 m	Yelena Isinbaeva	Russia	2002	
Pole vault	4.50 m	Tatyana Polnova	Russia	2003	
Pole vault	4.50 m	Anastasiya Savchenko	Russia	30 June 2013	
Long jump	7.52 m	Galina Chistyakova	Soviet Union	1988	
Triple jump	14.95 m	Inessa Kravets	Soviet Union	1991	
Shot put	22.63 m	Natalya Lisovskaya	Soviet Union	1987	
Discus throw	71.58 m	Ellina Zvereva	Soviet Union	1988	
Hammer throw	77.41 m	Tatyana Lysenko	Russia	2006	
Javelin throw	64.49 m	Valeria Zabruskova	Russia	2003	
