= Meteor Stadium (Zhukovsky) =

Multi-use stadium in Zhukovsky, Russia

Coordinates: 55°35′18″N 38°07′29″E

- Interactive map of Meteor Stadium
- Full name: Meteor Stadium
- Location: Zhukovsky, Russia
- Capacity: 7,500

Construction
- Opened: 1955
- Renovated: 2005

Tenant
- FC Saturn-2 Moscow Oblast Znamensky Memorial

Meteor Stadium is a multi-use stadium in Zhukovsky, Russia. It is used mostly for football matches, on club level by FC Saturn-2 Moscow Oblast of the Russian Second Division. It is also used for athletics competitions, including the Znamensky Memorial. The stadium has a capacity of 7,500 spectators.
