= Colorful Daegu Championships Meeting =

Athletics tournament in Daegu, South Korea

- Date: May
- Location: Daegu, South Korea
- Event type: Track and field
- Established: 2005
- Last held: 2012
- Website: Colorful Daegu Championships Meeting

The Colorful Daegu Championships Meeting was an annual track and field competition at the Daegu Stadium in Daegu, South Korea as part of the IAAF World Challenge Meetings. The first edition took place in 2005 under the name Colorful Daegu Pre-Championship Meeting. The event was last organized in 2012.

== Meet records ==
=== Men ===
Men's meeting records of the Colorful Daegu Championships Meeting
Event	Record	Athlete	Nationality	Date	Ref.	Video
100 m	9.86 (+0.1 m/s)	Usain Bolt	Jamaica	19 May 2010		
200 m	19.65 (±0.0 m/s)	Wallace Spearmon	United States	28 September 2006		
400 m	44.72	Kirani James	Grenada	16 May 2012		
800 m	1:43.51	Mohammed Aman	Ethiopia	16 May 2012		
1500 m	3:53.09	Philemon Kimutai	Kenya	28 September 2006		
5000 m	13:24.92	Joseph Kitur Kiplimo	Kenya	25 September 2009		
110 m hurdles	13.11 (−0.2 m/s)	David Oliver	United States	19 May 2010		
400 m hurdles	48.72	L. J. van Zyl	South Africa	25 September 2008		
3000 m steeplechase	8:12.08	Hillary Kipsang Yego	Kenya	12 May 2011		
High jump	2.30 m	Stefan Holm	Sweden	28 September 2006		
Pole vault	5.56 m	Brad Walker	United States	2005		
Long jump	7.99 m (+0.8 m/s)	Ignisious Gaisah	Ghana	16 May 2012		
Triple jump	17.50 m	Aarik Wilson	United States	3 October 2007		
Shot put	21.14 m	Ryan Whiting	United States	16 May 2012		
Javelin throw	86.95 m	Teemu Wirkkala	Finland	25 September 2009		
4 × 400 m relay	3:01.04	Kei Takase; Yuzo Kanemaru; Yusuke Ishitsuka; Hiroyuki Nakano	Japan	16 May 2012		

=== Women ===
Women's meeting records of the Colorful Daegu Championships Meeting
Event	Record	Athlete	Nationality	Date	Ref.	Video
100 m	10.83 (−0.4 m/s)	Carmelita Jeter	United States	25 September 2009		
200 m	22.38 (+0.4 m/s)	Allyson Felix	United States	12 May 2011		
800 m	2:00.51	Kenia Sinclair	Jamaica	19 May 2010		
1500 m	4:03.52	Anna Mishchenko	Ukraine	12 May 2011		
5000 m	16:30.57	Tirunesh Dibaba	Ethiopia	2005		
100 m hurdles	12.60	Brigitte Foster-Hylton	Jamaica	25 September 2009		
3000m steeplechase	9:24.51	Ruth Bisibori Nyangau	Kenya	3 October 2007		
High jump	1.94 m	Xingjuan Zheng	China	12 May 2011		
High jump	1.94 m	Marina Aitova	Kazakhstan	12 May 2011		
Pole vault	4.80 m	Elena Isinbaeva	Russia	3 October 2007		
Long jump	6.90 m	Tatyana Lebedeva	Russia	3 October 2007		
Hammer throw	77.24 m	Betty Heidler	Germany	16 May 2012		
Javelin throw	66.37 m	Maria Abakumova	Russia	25 September 2009		
