= Moscow Challenge =

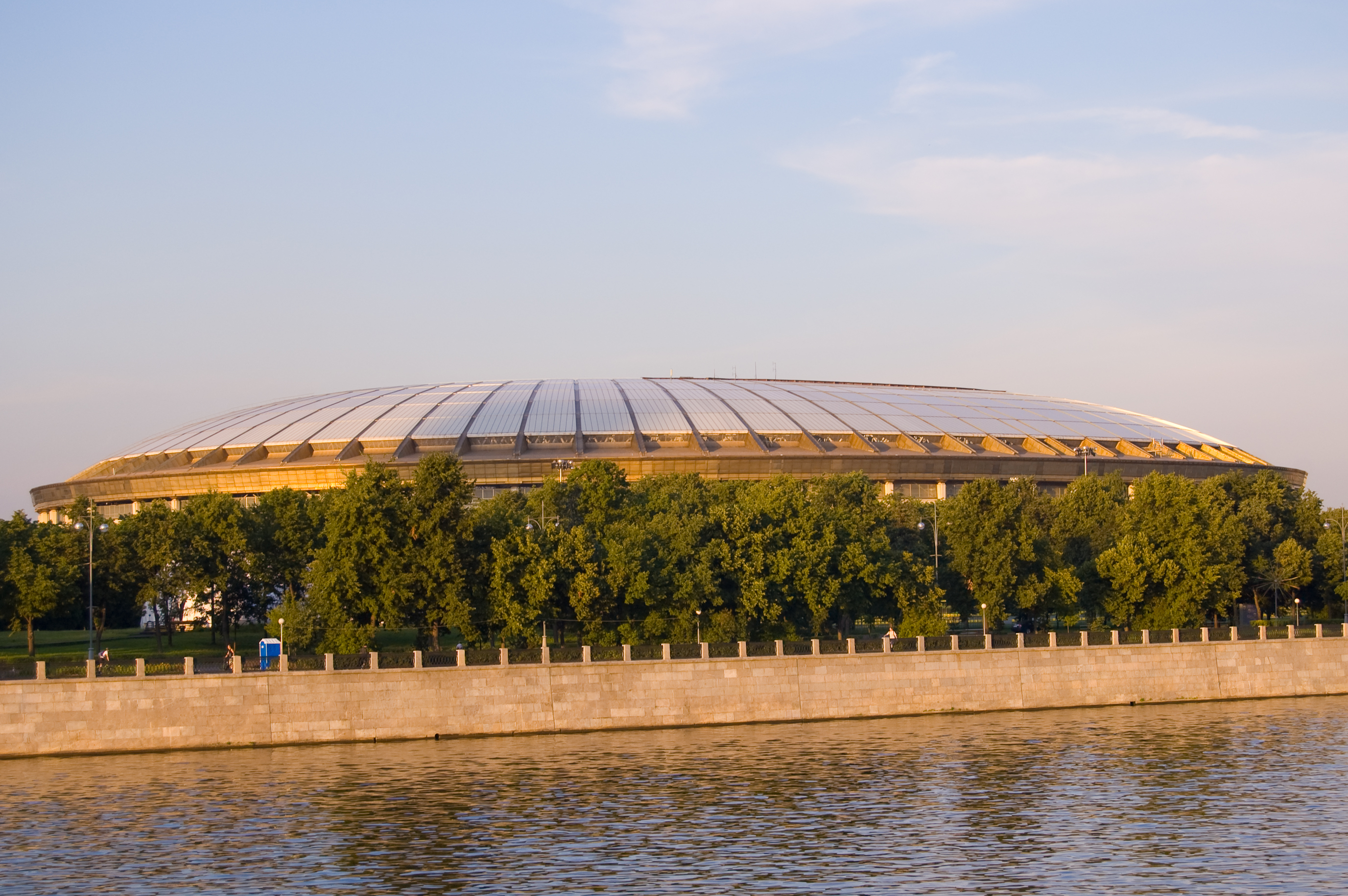
- Luzhniki Stadium
- Date: June
- Location: Moscow, Russia
- Event type: Track and field
- Established: 2011
- Last held: 2014
- Website: Moscow Challenge

The Moscow Challenge was a track and field competition at the Luzhniki Stadium in Moscow, Russia as part of the IAAF World Challenge Meetings. The first edition took place in 2011 and it was last organized in 2014.

== Meet records ==
=== Men ===
Men's meeting records of the Moscow Challenge
Event	Record	Athlete	Nationality	Date	Ref.
100 m	10.32 (−0.2 m/s)	Dwain Chambers	Great Britain	11 June 2013	
200 m	20.58 (−0.3 m/s)	Aleksandr Brednev	Russia	11 June 2012	
400 m	45.51	Pavel Trenikhin	Russia	11 June 2012	
800 m	1:44.93	André Olivier	South Africa	11 June 2013	
3000 m	7:59.89	Cornelius Kipruto Kangogo	Kenya	11 June 2012	
10,000 m	28:34.95	Yevgeny Rybakov	Russia	11 June 2013	
110 m hurdles	13.34 (+0.4 m/s)	Ryan Brathwaite	Barbados	11 June 2013	
400 m hurdles	49.87	Vladimir Antmanis	Russia	11 June 2012	
3000 m steeplechase	8:20.55	Birhan Getahun	Ethiopia	11 June 2012	
High jump	2.28 m	Bohdan Bonderenko	Ukraine	11 June 2013	
Pole vault	5.60 m	Przemyslaw Czerwinski	Poland	11 June 2012	
Pole vault	5.60 m	Anton Ivakin	Russia	11 June 2013	
Pole vault	5.60 m	Artem Burya	Russia	11 June 2013	
Triple jump	16.65 m (+0.6 m/s)	Yoann Rapinier	France	11 June 2013	
Shot put	20.86 m	Maksim Sidorov	Russia	11 June 2012	
Discus throw	64.20 m	Bogdan Pishchalnikov	Russia	11 June 2012	
Hammer throw	79.20 m	Dilshod Nazarov	Tajikistan	11 June 2014	

=== Women ===
Women's meeting records of the Moscow Challenge
Event	Record	Athlete	Nationality	Date	Ref.
100 m	11.19 (−0.1 m/s)	Tameka Williams	Saint Kitts and Nevis	11 June 2012	
200 m	22.73 (+0.5 m/s)	Mariya Ryemyen	Ukraine	11 June 2013	
400 m	50.78	Natalya Nazarova	Russia	11 June 2012	
800 m	1:57.93	Mariya Savinova	Russia	11 June 2012	
1500 m	4:09.06	Yekaterina Ishova	Russia	11 June 2013	
10,000 m	31:07.88	Elizaveta Grechishnikova	Russia	11 June 2012	
100 m hurdles	13.12 (+0.5 m/s)	Tatyana Dektyareva	Russia	11 June 2013	
3000 m steeplechase	9:35.72	Natalya Gorchakova	Russia	11 June 2012	
High jump	1.98 m	Svetlana Shkolina	Russia	11 June 2012	
Long jump	6.79 m (+0.5 m/s)	Veronika Mosina	Russia	11 June 2013	
Triple jump	14.36 m (+0.6 m/s)	Yekaterina Koneva	Russia	11 June 2012	
Shot put	18.39 m	Nadine Kleinert	Germany	11 June 2013	
Hammer throw	74.28 m	Anita Włodarczyk	Poland	10 June 2013	
Javelin throw	65.94 m	Mariya Abakumova	Russia	11 June 2013	
