= IAAF World Challenge Beijing =

Track and field competition in Beijing, China

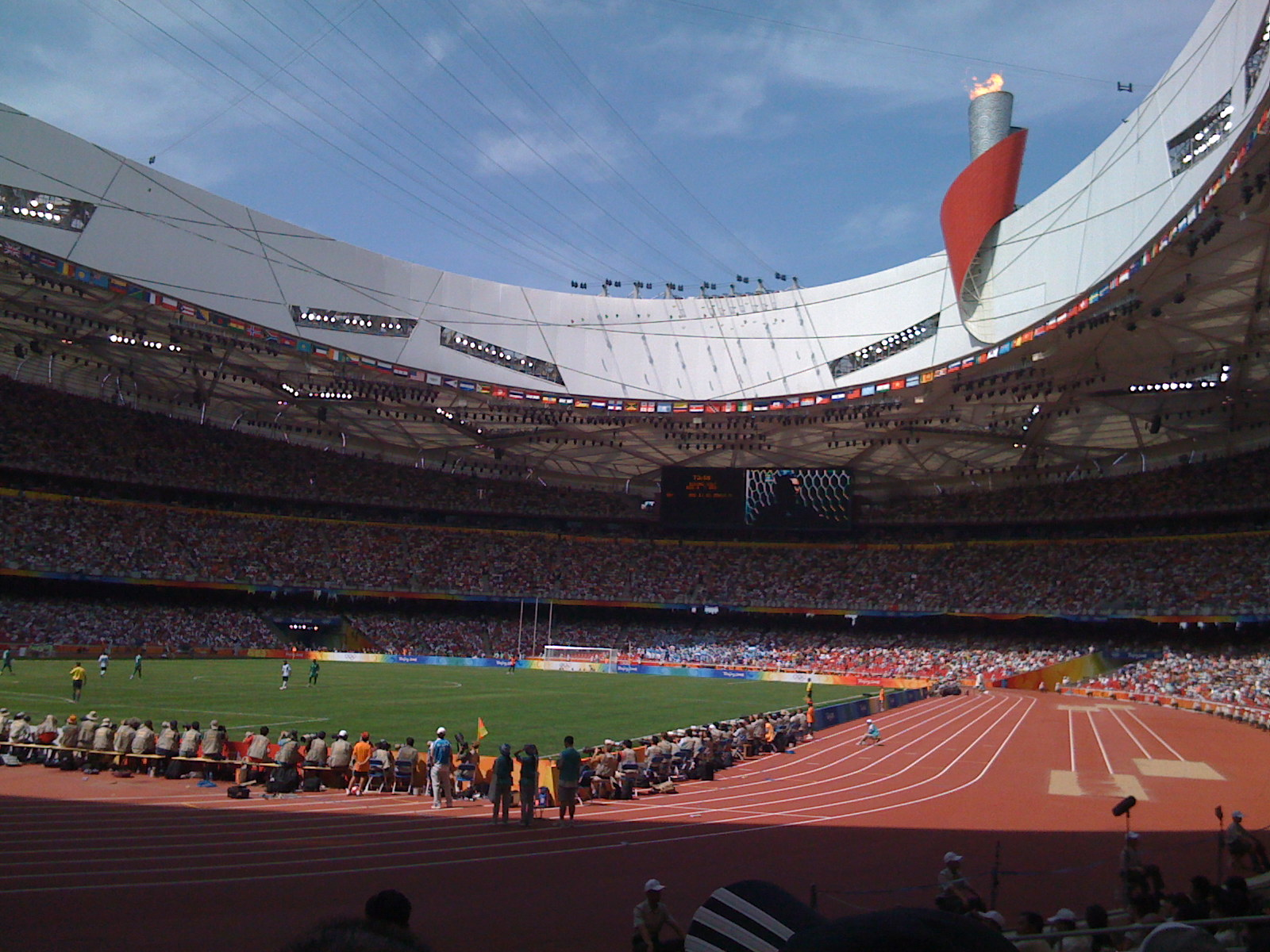
- The host stadium – National Stadium (Birds Nest)
- Date: May
- Location: Beijing, China
- Event type: Track and field
- Established: 2013
- Website: IAAF World Challenge Beijing Website

IAAF World Challenge Beijing is an annual track and field competition held in Beijing, China, in May. First held in 2013, it takes place at the Beijing National Stadium, the venue for the Athletics at the 2008 Summer Olympics. It is part of the IAAF World Challenge circuit, the second tier of international track and field competitions after the IAAF Diamond League.

== Meet records ==
=== Men ===
Men's meeting records of the IAAF World Challenge Beijing
Event	Record	Athlete	Nationality	Date	Ref.
100 m	9.87 (±0.0 m/s)	Justin Gatlin	United States	21 May 2014	
200 m	20.40 (+0.3 m/s)	LaShawn Merritt	United States	21 May 2013	
800 m	1:45.45	Alfred Kipketer	Kenya	20 May 2015	
110 m hurdles	13.15 (+0.6 m/s)	David Oliver	United States	20 May 2015	
3000 m steeplechase	8:06.04	Paul Kipsiele Koech	Kenya	21 May 2014	
High jump	2.36 m	Ivan Ukhov	Russia	21 May 2014	
High jump	2.36 m	Majd Eddin Ghazal	Syria	18 May 2016	
Pole vault	5.92 m	Sam Kendricks	United States	18 May 2016	
Long jump	8.31 m (+0.1 m/s)	Li Jinzhe	China	21 May 2013	
Triple jump	16.72 m (+0.2 m/s)	Cao Shuo	China	21 May 2013	
Javelin throw	83.94 m	Keshorn Walcott	Trinidad and Tobago	21 May 2014	
4 × 100 m relay	38.21	Yang Yang; Xie Zhenye; Su Bingtian; Zhang Peimeng	China	18 May 2016	

=== Women ===
Women's meeting records of the IAAF World Challenge Beijing
Event	Record	Athlete	Nationality	Date	Ref.
100 m	11.04 (+1.2 m/s)	Blessing Okagbare	Nigeria	21 May 2013	
200 m	22.29 (+0.2 m/s)	Veronica Campbell-Brown	Jamaica	18 May 2016	
1500 m	4:02.11	Hellen Obiri	Kenya	18 May 2016	
100 m hurdles	12.58 (+0.2 m/s)	Brianna Rollins	United States	21 May 2014	
400 m hurdles	54.37	Wenda Nel	South Africa	20 May 2015	
3000 m steeplechase	9:25.68	Purity Kirui	Kenya	21 May 2014	
High jump	2.02 m	Anna Chicherova	Russia	21 May 2013	
Pole vault	4.50 m	Li Ling	China	21 May 2013	
Long jump	6.58 m (+0.1 m/s)	Tori Polk	United States	21 May 2013	
Shot put	20.77 m	Christina Schwanitz	Germany	20 May 2015	
Hammer throw	77.73 m	Anita Włodarczyk	Poland	20 May 2015	
Javelin throw	64.37 m	Kathryn Mitchell	Australia	18 May 2016	
4 × 100 m relay	42.65	Yuan Qiqi; Wei Yongli; Ge Manqi; Liang Xiaojing	China	18 May 2016	
