= Stadio Raul Guidobaldi =

Athletics stadium in Rieti, Italy

Coordinates: 42°24′01″N 12°51′02″E

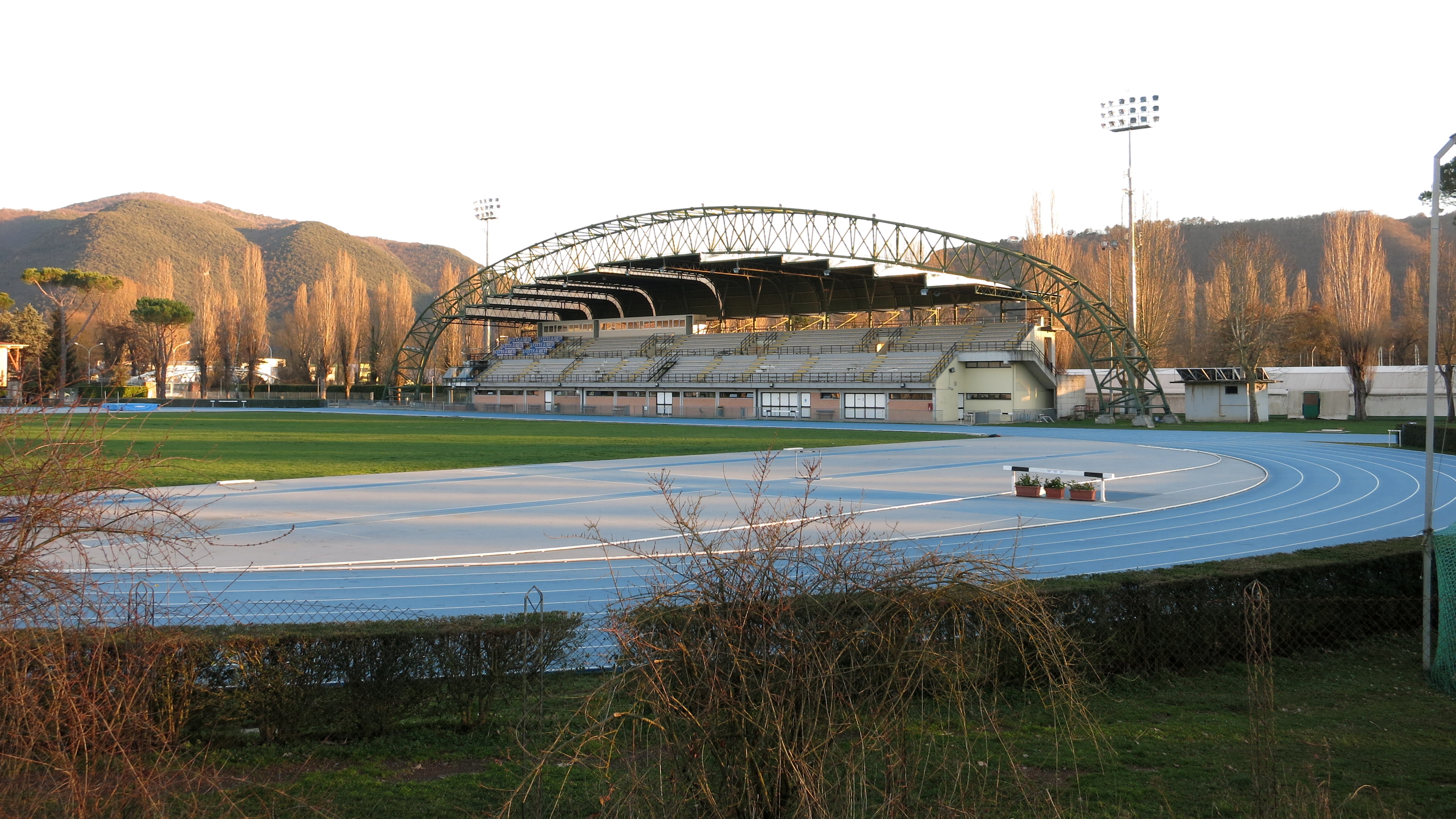
- The main track and the Velino grandstand
- Interactive map of Stadio Raul Guidobaldi
- Full name: Stadio Raul Guidobaldi
- Location: Rieti, Italy
- Capacity: 5,000

Construction
- Built: 1960

Tenant
- Rieti Meeting

Stadio Raul Guidobaldi is an athletics stadium located in Rieti, Italy. Every year since 1971 the stadium hosts the Rieti Meeting; it also hosted the 2013 European Athletics Junior Championships.

Eight world records have been set in the stadium, including the 9.74 record for the 100 metres by Asafa Powell in 2007. Steve Cram has called the stadium a Mecca for middle-distance runners.

== History ==
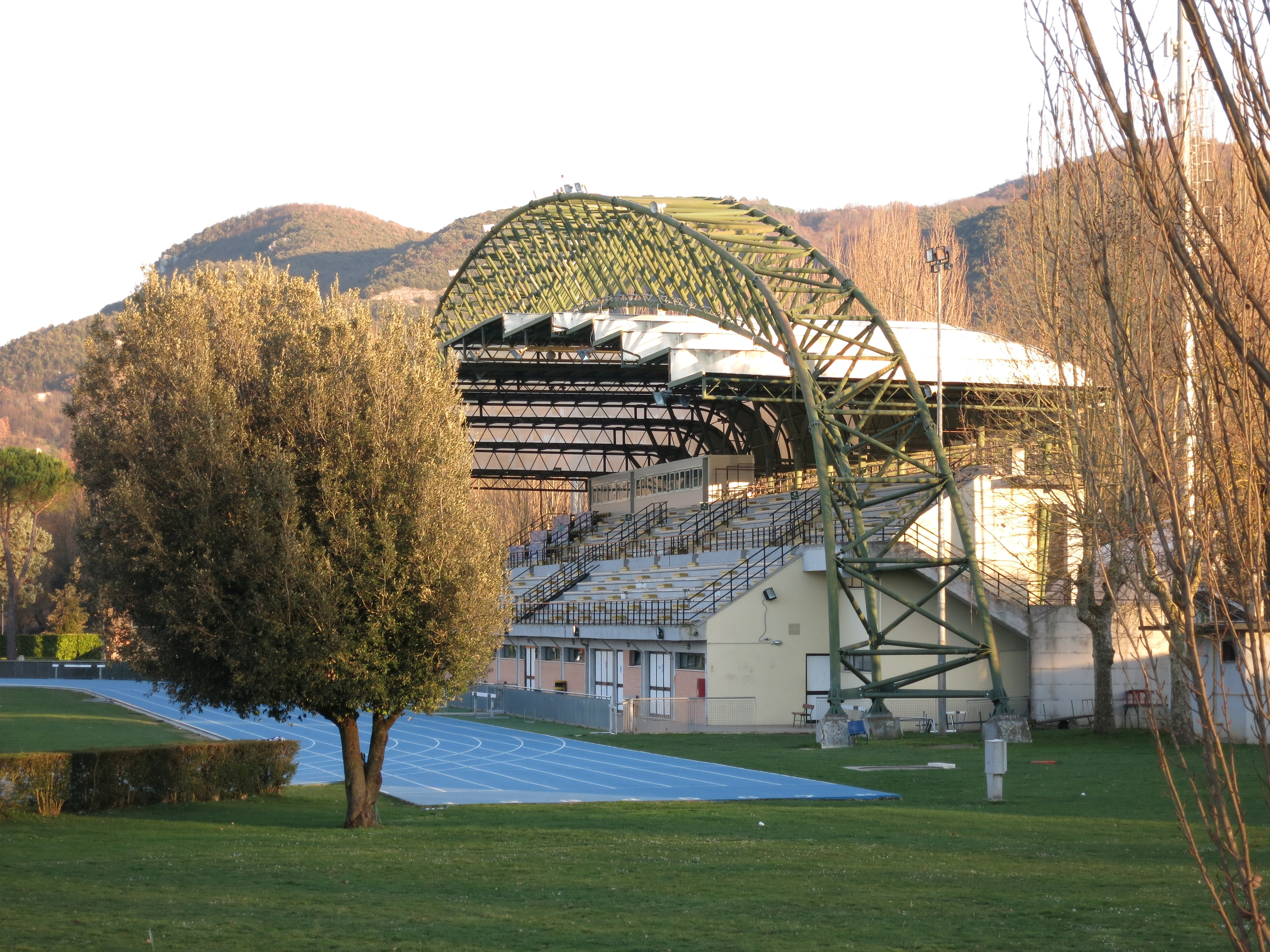
The Velino grandstand

The stadium was built as part of the construction program for the 1960 Summer Olympics and inaugurated on 23 July 1960. In the 1980s a second grandstand and a marquee with an indoor track were built. In 1999 a roof was built for the main grandstand and the track was expanded to eight lanes. In 2011-2012 all tracks were rebuilt in sportflex material and painted in blue by company Mondo.

== Description ==
The stadium is located in south-west Rieti, near other sport facilities, and is bordered by the Velino river. The main track is made of sportflex and is 8 lane wide. Along each straight is a grandstand, with a total capacity of 5,000 spectators: the main one, called "Velino", has a roof supported by large steel arches and also hosts the changing rooms and the press station; the smaller one is called "Terminillo" and is not covered.

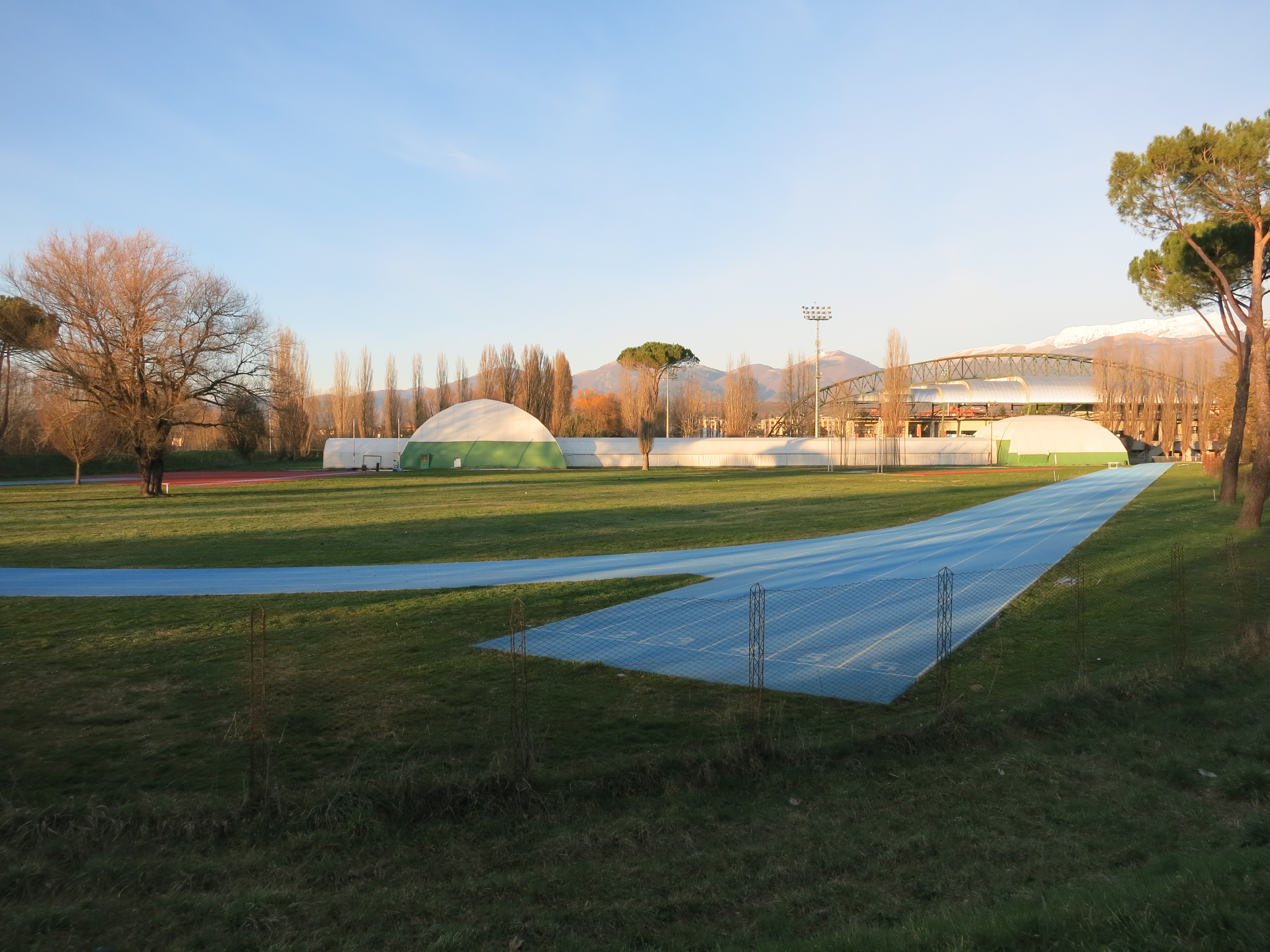
The warming up area on the back

Behind the main track is an area reserved to training and warming up, with a 250-metres-long 6-lane track, an area equipped for the long jump and javelin, and a marquee with a heated indoor track for winter trainings.
