= Centro Deportivo Municipal Moratalaz =

Sports complex in Madrid, Spain

Coordinates: 40.398031°N 3.631409°W

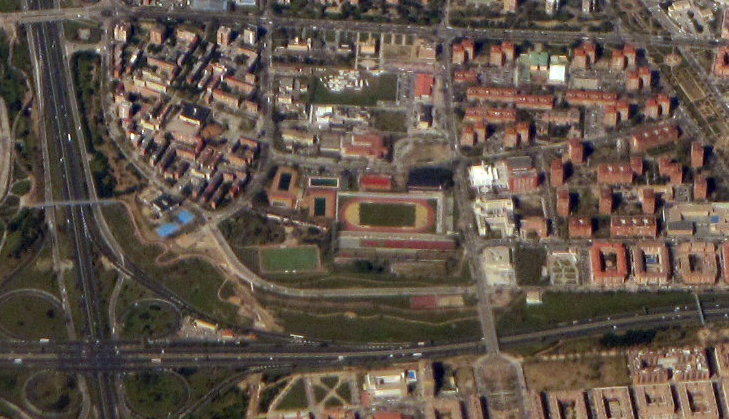
- Aerial view of the complex
- Interactive map of Centro Deportivo Municipal Moratalaz
- Location: CalleValdebernardo, 2. 28030; Moratalaz, Madrid, Spain
- Owner: Community of Madrid

The Centro Deportivo Municipal Moratalaz, also known as the Polideportivo de Moratalaz, is a sports complex located in the Moratalaz district of Madrid, Spain. The 108.3 m² facility in the Pavones ward includes the following sports venues: an athletics track, an outdoor football pitch, three indoor soccer courts, two fronton courts for basque pelota, a handball court, six tennis courts, a beach volleyball court, and outdoor and an indoor swimming pool, an archery range, an ice rink for skating, and a multi-use indoor sports hall. It also as facilities to support padel, rhythmic gymnastics and bodybuilding.

An annual track and field event, the Meeting de Atletismo Madrid, is hosted at the athletics stadium, which had a blue track installed in 2014. The competition has regularly been a part of the IAAF World Challenge series since 2010, was an IAAF Grand Prix level meeting from 2006 to 2009, and was an IAAF Super Grand Prix meeting from 2003 to 2005. It has also hosted IAAF Hammer Throw Challenge events regularly since 2010.
