= Golden Grand Prix =

Athletics tournament held in Kawasaki, Japan

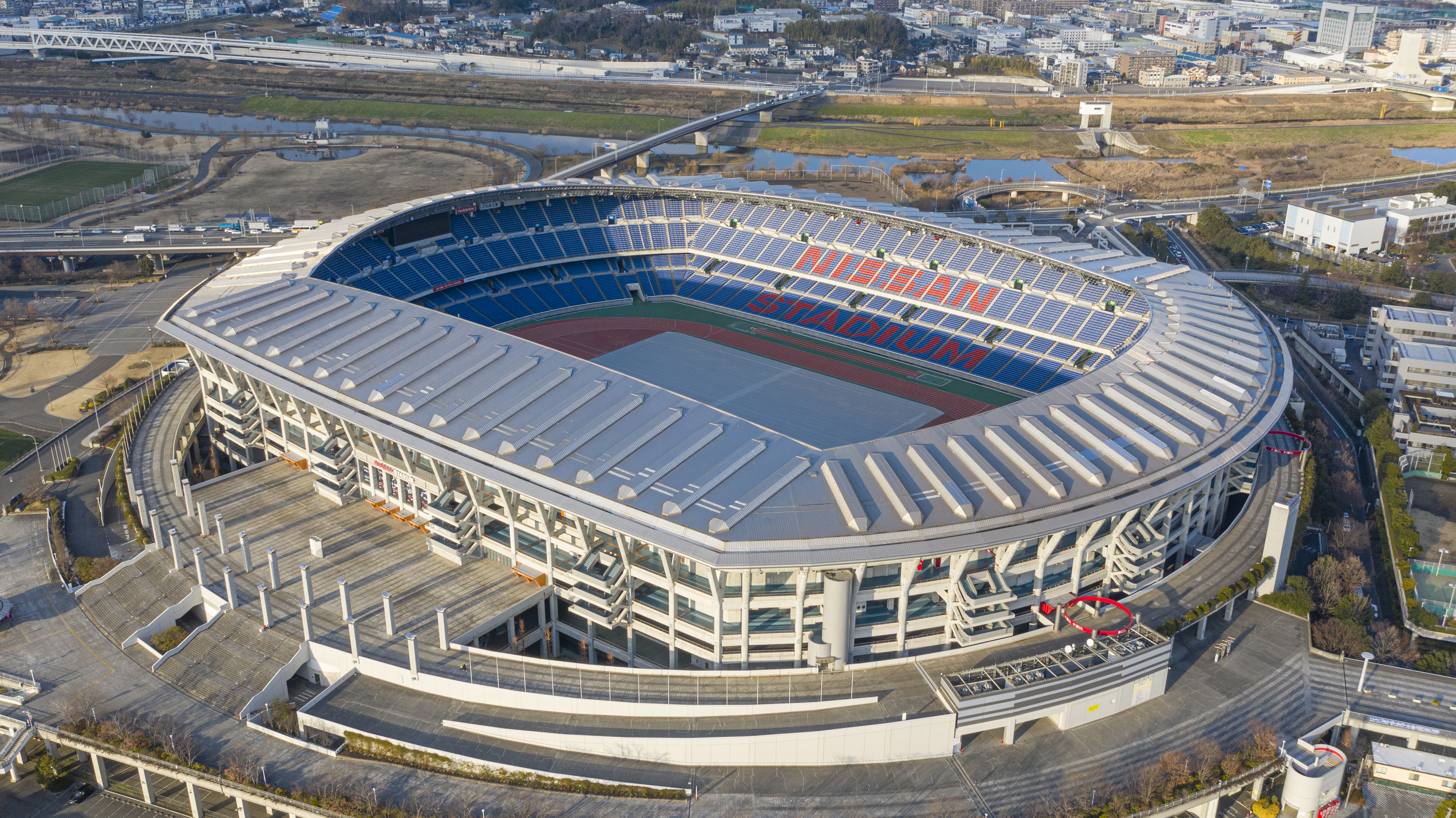
- Nissan International Stadium
- Date: May
- Location: Yokohama, Japan
- Event type: Track and field
- Established: 2011
- Website: goldengrandprix-japan.com

The Seiko Golden Grand Prix, formerly known as the Golden Grand Prix Kawasaki, is a track and field competition at the International Stadium Yokohama, Japan as part of the World Athletics Continental Tour. It was first organized in 2011 at the Todoroki Athletics Stadium in Kawasaki and sponsored by Seiko. It replaced the Osaka Grand Prix as the major athletics meet in Japan.

In 2013 the Seiko Golden Grand Prix Japanese leg of IAAF World Challenge moved from Kawasaki to Japan National Stadium in Tokyo. Meanwhile the 2018 edition moved back to Yanmar Stadium Nagai in Osaka. From 2020 until 2022 the meeting again was held in Tokyo before it moved to Yokohama in 2023.

== Meet records ==
=== Men ===
Men's meeting records of the Golden Grand Prix
Event	Record	Athlete	Nationality	Date	Place	Ref.
100 m	9.88 (+1.5 m/s)	Fred Kerley	United States	21 May 2023	Yokohama	
200 m	19.84 (−0.4 m/s)	Michael Norman	United States	19 May 2019	Osaka	
400 m	44.62	Michael Norman	United States	8 May 2022	Tokyo	
800 m	1:45.75	Sho Kawamoto	Japan	11 May 2014		
1500 m	3:37.72	Ryan Gregson	Australia	20 May 2018	Osaka	
3000 m	7:38.98	Nagiya Mori	Japan	17 May 2026	Tokyo	
5000 m	13:18.94	Emmanuel Moi Maru	Kenya	19 May 2024	Tokyo	
110 m hurdles	13.07 (+0.8 m/s)	Shunsuke Izumiya	Japan	21 May 2023	Yokohama	
400 m hurdles	48.36	Ken Toyoda	Japan	19 May 2024	Tokyo	
3000 m steeplechase	8:15.26	Jairus Kipchoge Birech	Kenya	5 May 2013	Tokyo	
High jump	2.40 m	Bohdan Bondarenko	Ukraine	11 May 2014		
Pole vault	5.62 m	Shawnacy Barber	Canada	8 May 2016		
Long jump	8.26 m (+1.0 m/s)	Hiromichi Yoshida	Japan	21 May 2023	Yokohama	
Triple jump	17.18 m (+1.7 m/s)	Ruiting Wu	China	21 May 2017		
Shot put	21.33 m	Christian Cantwell	United States	11 May 2014		
Discus throw	63.98 m	Rodney Brown	United States	8 May 2016		
Hammer throw	79.47 m	Krisztián Pars	Hungary	8 May 2011		
Javelin throw	86.76 m	Jakub Vadlejch	Czech Republic	8 May 2016		
4 × 100 m relay	37.85	Ryoto Yamagata; Shoto Iizuka; Yoshihide Kiryu; Aska Cambridge	Japan	20 May 2018	Osaka	
4 × 400 m relay	3:04.15		Japan	6 May 2012		

=== Women ===
Women's meeting records of the Golden Grand Prix
Event	Record	Athlete	Nationality	Date	Place	Ref.
100 m	11.17 (−0.3 m/s)	Zoe Hobbs	New Zealand	19 May 2024	Tokyo	
200 m	22.55 (+0.5 m/s)	Ivet Lalova	Bulgaria	19 May 2019		
400 m	49.85	Yemi Mary John	Great Britain	17 May 2026	Tokyo	
800 m	2:00.22	Emily Cherotich Tuei	Kenya	20 May 2018	Osaka	
1500 m	4:01.10	Georgia Griffith	Australia	18 May 2025	Tokyo	
3000 m	8:39.24	Janet Jepkoech	Kenya	17 May 2026	Tokyo	
5000 m	14:41.65	Rose Davies	Australia	19 May 2024	Tokyo	
100 m hurdles	12.54 (+0.7 m/s)	Tonea Marshall	United States	18 May 2025	Tokyo	
400 m hurdles	55.23	Lauren Wells	Australia	8 May 2016		
3000 m steeplechase	9:31.30	Caroline Chepkurui	Kenya	8 May 2016		
High jump	1.96 m	Yaroslava Mahuchikh	Ukraine	18 May 2025	Tokyo	
Pole vault	4.61 m	Kristen Hixson	United States	20 May 2018	Osaka	
Long jump	6.88 m (+2.0 m/s)	Darya Klishina	Russia	11 May 2014		
Triple jump	14.08 m (+0.3 m/s)	Saly Sarr	Senegal	19 May 2024	Tokyo	
Shot put	18.94 m	Anita Márton	Hungary	10 May 2015		
Hammer throw	75.27 m	Wang Zheng	China	19 May 2019		
Javelin throw	67.12 m	Liu Shiying	China	20 May 2018	Osaka	
4 × 100 m relay	42.83	Yuan Qiqi; Wei Yongli; Ge Manqi; Liang Xiaojing	China	8 May 2016		
4 × 400 m relay	3:33.72	Seika Aoyama; Kana Ichikawa; Kaede Kashiyama; Manami Kira	Japan	8 May 2016		
