= IAAF World Challenge Dakar =

Athletics tournament in Dakar, Senegal

- Stade Léopold Sédar Senghor
- Date: May
- Location: Dakar, Senegal
- Event type: Track and field
- Established: 2003
- Website: meeting-dakar.com

The IAAF World Challenge Dakar is an annual one-day track and field competition at the Stade Leopold Senghor in Dakar, Senegal as part of the IAAF World Challenge Meetings. It was first organized in 2003 as the Meeting International d'Athletisme de la Ville de Dakar. From 2006 to 2009 the IAAF classified it among IAAF Grand Prix meetings, and it was known as the Meeting Grand Prix IAAF de Dakar as a result.

== Meet records ==
=== Men ===
Men's meeting records of IAAF World Challenge Dakar
Event	Record	Athlete	Nationality	Date	Ref.
100 m	9.98 (+3.5 m/s)	Aziz Zakari	Ghana	4 April 2003	
200 m	20.56	Uchenna Emedolu	Nigeria	2003	
400 m	45.29	Young Talkmore Nyongani	Zimbabwe	2004	
800 m	1:45.40	Ferguson Rotich	Kenya	12 June 2013	
1500 m	3:35.15	Daniel Kipchirchir Komen	Kenya	12 June 2013	
3000 m	7:43.99	Mohamed Moustaoui	Morocco	28 May 2011	
110 m hurdles	13.60	David Oliver	United States	2006	
400 m hurdles	48.68	Angelo Taylor	United States	28 April 2007	
High jump	2.30 m	Aleksey Dmitrik	Russia	28 May 2011	
Pole vault	5.55 m	Denis Yurchenko	Ukraine	17 May 2008	
Pole vault	5.55 m	Jurij Rovan	Slovenia	17 May 2008	
Long jump	8.27 m	Ndiss Kaba Badji	Senegal	24 April 2010	
Triple jump	17.08 m	Randy Lewis	Grenada	17 May 2008	
Shot put	21.53 m	Christian Cantwell	United States	2009	
Discus throw	64.93 m	Gábor Máté	Hungary	17 May 2008	
Hammer throw	75.29 m	Pavel Bareisha	Belarus	25 May 2016	
Javelin throw	81.10 m	Andreas Thorkildsen	Norway	2007	

=== Women ===
Women's meeting records of IAAF World Challenge Dakar
Event	Record	Athlete	Nationality	Date	Ref.
100 m	11.10 (+1.7 m/s)	Oludamola Osayomi	Nigeria	17 May 2008	
200 m	23.20	Sheri-Ann Brooks	Jamaica		
200 m	23.20 (±0.0 m/s)	Aida Diop	Senegal	23 March 2002	
400 m	50.94	Amy Mbacké Thiam	Senegal		
400 m	50.94	Amantle Montsho	Botswana	2010	
800 m	2:00.61	Caster Semenya	South Africa	28 May 2011	
3000 m	8:44.30	Almaz Ayana	Ethiopia	12 June 2013	
100 m hurdles	12.94	Tacko Diouf	Senegal	2000	
100 m hurdles	12.94 (+0.1 m/s)	Christina Manning	United States	25 May 2016	
400 m hurdles	55.84	Surita Febraio	South Africa	2005	
High jump	1.94 m	Doreen Amata	Nigeria	23 May 2015	
Pole vault	4.40 m	Robeilys Peinado	Venezuela	25 May 2016	
Long jump	6.74 m (+1.8 m/s)	Keila Costa	Brazil	28 April 2007	
Triple jump	14.22 m (±0.0 m/s)	Susana Costa	Portugal	23 May 2015	
Shot put	19.51 m	Nadine Kleinert	Germany	17 May 2008	
Discus throw	59.38 m	Sabine Rumpf	Germany	12 June 2013	
Hammer throw	75.33 m	Betty Heidler	Germany	28 May 2011	
Javelin throw	60.48 m	Līna Mūze	Latvia	23 May 2015	
