= Rieti Meeting =

Athletics tournament held in Rieti, Italy

The Rieti Meeting is an annual athletics event at the Stadio Raul Guidobaldi in Rieti, Italy that takes place in late August or early September. Previously one of the IAAF Grand Prix events, it is now part of the IAAF World Challenge.

It was first organized in 1971 based on an idea by Sandro Giovannelli, today's member of the IAAF Competition Commission.

== World records ==
Over the course of its history, numerous world records have been set at the Rieti Grand Prix.

World records set at the Rieti Meeting
Year	Event	Record	Athlete	Nationality
1982	Mile	4:17.44	Maricica Puică	Romania
1983	1500 m	3:30.77	Steve Ovett	United Kingdom
1992	1500 m	3:28.86	Noureddine Morceli	Algeria
1993	Mile	3:44.39	Noureddine Morceli	Algeria
1996	3000 m	7:20.67	Daniel Komen	Kenya
1999	1000 m	2:11.96	Noah Ngeny	Kenya
2007	100 m	9.74 (+1.7 m/s)	Asafa Powell	Jamaica
2010	800 m	1:41.01	David Rudisha	Kenya

== Meeting records ==
=== Men ===
Men's meeting records of the Rieti Meeting
Event	Record	Athlete	Nationality	Date	Ref.
100 m	9.74 (+1.7 m/s)	Asafa Powell	Jamaica	9 September 2007	
200 m	19.85 (+0.6 m/s)	Wallace Spearmon	United States	29 August 2010	
300 m	31.93	Karol Zalewski	Poland	7 September 2014	
400 m	44.21	Michael Johnson	United States	9 September 1990	
800 m	1:41.01	David Rudisha	Kenya	29 August 2010	
1000 m	2:11.96	Noah Ngeny	Kenya	5 September 1999	
1500 m	3:26.96	Hicham El Guerrouj	Morocco	8 September 2002	
Mile	3:44.39	Noureddine Morceli	Algeria	1993	
2000 m	4:49.00	Vénuste Niyongabo	Burundi	1997	
Two miles	8:13.40	Moses Kiptanui	Kenya	1995	
3000 m	7:20.67	Daniel Komen	Kenya	1 September 1996	
5000 m	13:04.43	Daniel Komen	Kenya	3 September 2000	
110 m hurdles	13.01 (+0.8 m/s)	David Oliver	United States	29 August 2010	
400 m hurdles	47.91	Samuel Matete	Zambia	1992	
3000 m steeplechase	8:00.54	Moses Kiptanui	Kenya	1997	
High jump	2.38 m	Igor Paklin	Soviet Union	7 September 1986	
Pole vault	5.96 m	Brad Walker	United States	2005	
Long jump	8.45 m (±0.0 m/s)	Larry Myricks	United States	9 September 1981	
Triple jump	17.54 m	Khristo Markov	Bulgaria	1987	
Shot put	21.00 m	Paolo Dal Soglio	Italy	1 September 1996	
Discus throw	68.38 m	Luis Delís	Cuba	2 September 1984	
Hammer throw	82.62 m	Koji Murofushi	Japan	9 September 2007	
Javelin throw	84.26 m	Lars Hamann	Germany	13 September 2015	
4 × 100 m relay	39.76	Gianfranco Lazzer; Mauro Zuliani; Luciano Caravani; Massimo Clementoni	Italy	1979	
4 × 400 m relay	3:03.55	Walter McCoy; Mike Franks; Darrell Robinson; Mark Rowe	United States	1988	

=== Women ===
Men's meeting records of the Rieti Meeting
Event	Record	Athlete	Nationality	Date	Ref.
100 m	10.81	Irina Privalova	Russia	1992	
200 m	21.88	Irina Privalova	Russia	1993	
400 m	49.02	Jarmila Kratochvílová	Czech Republic	2 September 1984	
800 m	1:56.29	Janeth Jepkosgei	Kenya	9 September 2007	
1500 m	3:56.18	Maryam Jamal	Bahrain	27 August 2006	
Mile	4:17.44	Maricica Puică	Romania	1982	
2000 m	5:30.39	Maricica Puică	Romania	1985	
3000 m	8:30.25	Vivian Cheruiyot	Kenya	9 September 2007	
100 m hurdles	12.64 (+0.5 m/s)	Sally Pearson	Australia	8 September 2013	
400 m hurdles	53.34	Sandra Glover	United States	7 September 2003	
3000 m steeplechase	9:13.92	Ruth Bisibori Nyangau	Kenya	6 September 2009	
High jump	2.06 m	Stefka Kostadinova	Bulgaria	1987	
Pole vault	4.74 m	Fabiana Murer	Brazil	29 August 2010	
Long jump	7.19 m	Heike Drechsler	Germany	1991	
Triple jump	14.94 m	Tatyana Lebedeva	Russia	2008	
Shot put	20.77 m	Valerie Adams	New Zealand	9 September 2012	
Discus throw	66.12 m	Sandra Perković	Croatia	8 September 2013	
Hammer throw	76.57 m	Anita Włodarczyk	Poland	8 September 2013	
Javelin throw	66.64 m	Natalya Khoroneko	Belarus	7 September 1986	
4 × 100 m relay	44.97	International team: Andrea Lynch; Liliana Cragno; Leleith Hodges; Jacqueline Pusey		1975	

== See also ==
- Golden Gala
- Notturna di Milano
- Memorial Primo Nebiolo
