= Jamaica International Invitational =

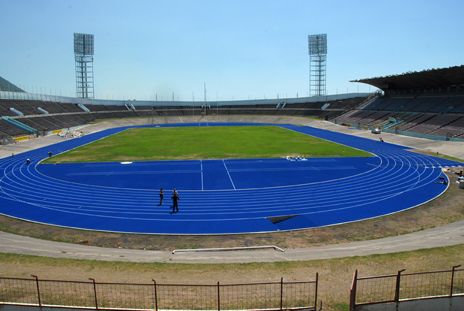
- National Stadium, Jamaica
- Date: May
- Location: Kingston, Jamaica
- Event type: Track and field
- Established: 2004
- Website: jainvite.com

The Jamaica International Invitational is an annual track and field competition at the National Stadium in Kingston, Jamaica as part of the IAAF World Challenge Meetings. It was first organized in 2004.

== Meet records ==
=== Men ===
Men's meeting records of the Jamaica International Invitational
Event	Record	Athlete	Nationality	Date	Ref.
100 m	9.76 (+1.8 m/s)	Usain Bolt	Jamaica	3 May 2008	
200 m	19.56 (−0.8 m/s)	Usain Bolt	Jamaica	1 May 2010	
400 m	44.59	Yousef Masrahi	Saudi Arabia	9 May 2015	
800 m	1:45.67	Khadevis Robinson	United States	4 May 2009	
1500 m	3:35.92	Aman Wote	Ethiopia	5 May 2012	
3000 m	7:59.92	Juan Luis Barrios	Mexico	9 May 2015	
110 m hurdles	13.16 (+1.0 m/s)	Aleec Harris	United States	9 May 2015	
400 m hurdles	47.79	Kerron Clement	United States	2 May 2008	
3000 m steeplechase	8:34.17	Ben Bruce	United States	5 May 2012	
High jump	2.28 m	Adam Shunk	United States	7 May 2005	
High jump	2.28 m	Jamal Wilson	Bahamas	19 May 2018	
Pole vault	5.80 m	Sam Kendricks	United States	20 May 2017	
Long jump	7.95 m (+1.6 m/s)	James Beckford	Jamaica	7 May 2005	
Triple jump	16.80 m NWI	Samyr Lainé	Haiti	7 May 2011	
Shot put	21.85 m	Christian Cantwell	United States	3 May 2014	
Discus throw	66.36 m	Fedrick Dacres	Jamaica	20 May 2017	
Javelin throw	76.30 m	Shakiel Waithe	Trinidad and Tobago	7 May 2016	

=== Women ===
Women's meeting records of the Jamaica International Invitational
Event	Record	Athlete	Nationality	Date	Ref.
100 m	10.81 (+1.0 m/s)	Carmelita Jeter	United States	5 May 2012	
200 m	22.09 (+0.5 m/s)	Elaine Thompson	Jamaica	20 May 2017	
400 m	49.89	Sanya Richards	United States	6 May 2006	
800 m	1:58.41	Kenia Sinclair	Jamaica	7 May 2011	
1500 m	4:08.37	Alexa Efraimson	United States	7 May 2016	
3000 m	9:41.12	Amela Terzić	Serbia	3 May 2014	
100 m hurdles	12.39 (+2.0 m/s)	Jasmin Stowers	United States	9 May 2015	
400 m hurdles	54.20	Lashinda Demus	United States	6 May 2006	
High jump	2.00 m	Chaunté Howard-Lowe	United States	1 May 2010	
Pole vault	4.50 m	Kylie Hutson	United States	3 May 2014	
Long jump	6.82 m (+0.2 m/s)	Ese Brume	Nigeria	19 May 2018	
Triple jump	14.87 m (+0.3 m/s)	Caterine Ibargüen	Colombia	9 May 2015	
Shot put	19.22 m	Michelle Carter	United States	5 May 2012	
Discus throw	62.41 m	Gia Lewis-Smallwood	United States	4 May 2013	
Hammer throw	76.27 m	DeAnna Price	United States	19 May 2018	
