= Fanny Blankers-Koen Stadion =

Multi-use stadium in Hengelo, Netherlands

Coordinates: 52°15′11.32″N 6°48′30.51″E

- Fanny Blankers-Koen Stadion
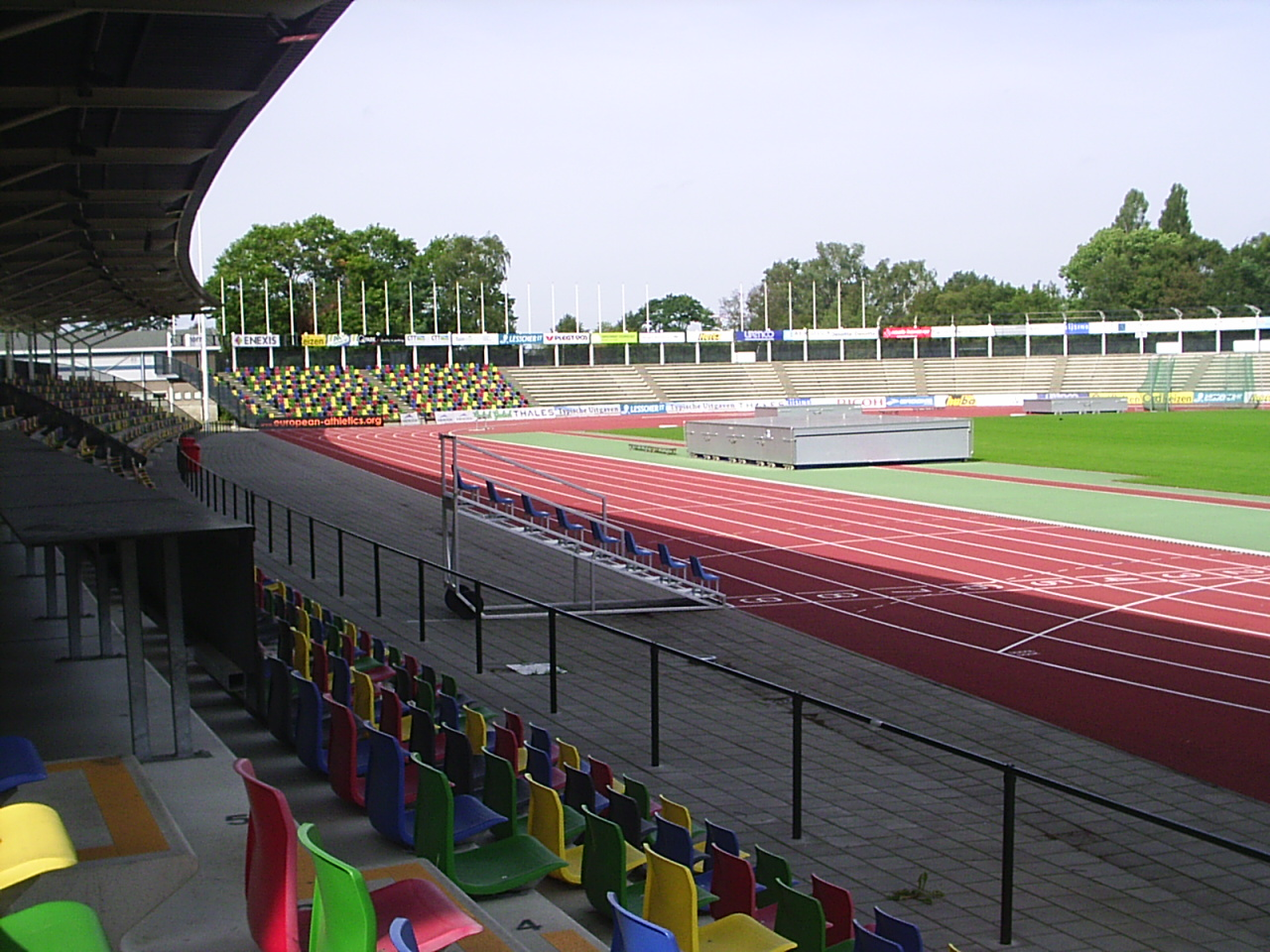
- Interactive map of Fanny Blankers-Koen Stadion
- Full name: Fanny Blankers-Koen Stadion
- Former names: Stadion Veldwijk (1948-1982)
- Location: Hengelo, Netherlands
- Capacity: 8,000+

Construction
- Opened: 1948
- Renovated: 2004–2007

Tenant
- Fanny Blankers-Koen Games

Fanny Blankers-Koen Stadion (Dutch pronunciation: [ˈfɑni ˈblɑŋkərs ˈkun ˌstaːdijɔn]) is a multi-use stadium in Hengelo, Netherlands. It is currently used mostly for athletics meets, especially the annual Fanny Blankers-Koen Games, and also was the venue for the European Athletics Junior Championships in July 2007. It holds more than 8,000 people and is named after the Dutch athlete Fanny Blankers-Koen. The stadium was originally known as Stadion Veldwijk (Dutch pronunciation: [ˈstaːdijɔɱ ˈvɛltʋɛik]), but changed to its current name in 1982.
