= Meeting de Atletismo Madrid =

Athletics tournament held in Madrid, Spain

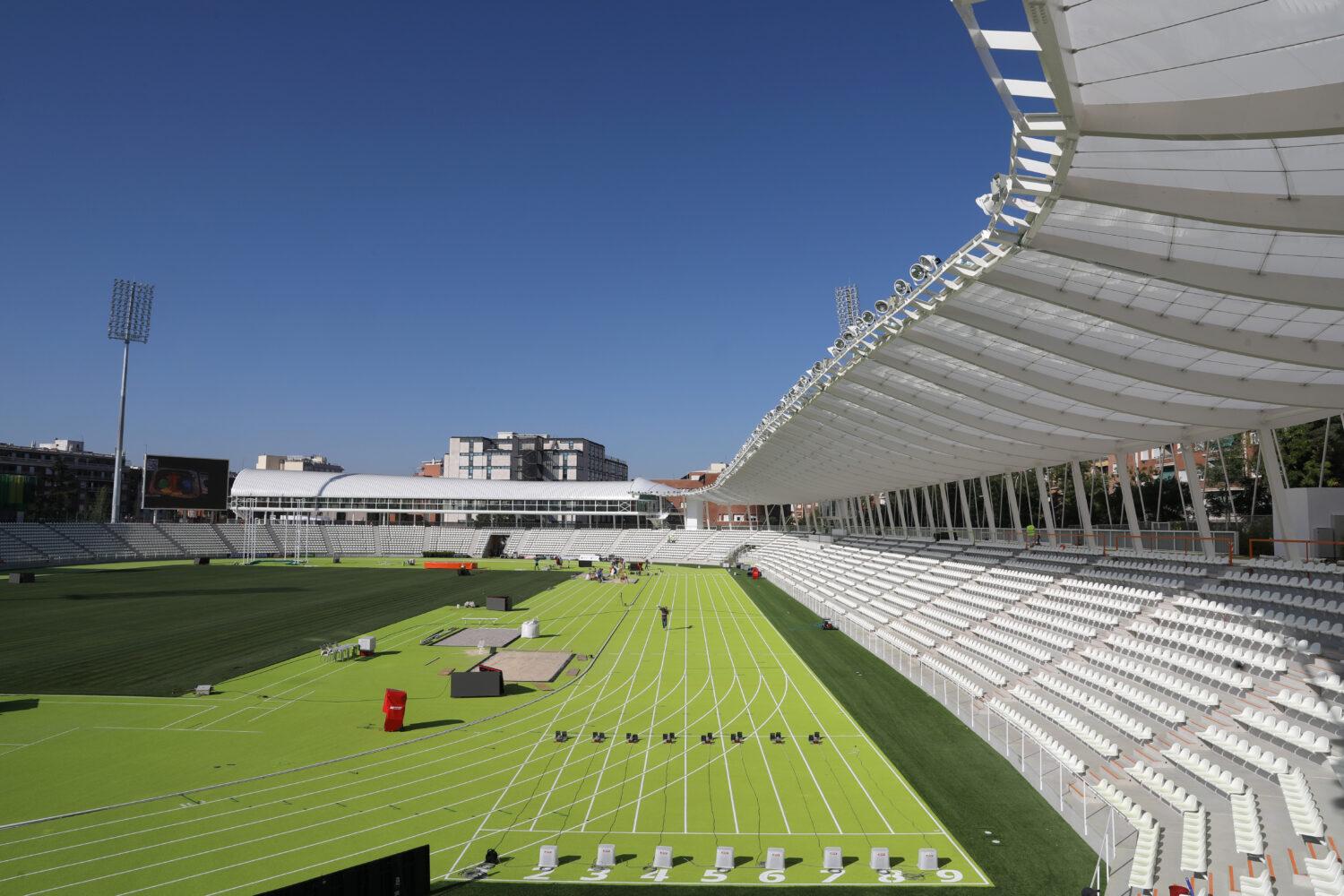
- Meeting venue at Estadio de Vallehermoso
- Date: July
- Location: Madrid, Spain
- Event type: Track and field
- Established: 1979
- Website: madridathletics.es

The Meeting de Atletismo Madrid is an annual international athletics meeting that takes place at the Estadio de Vallehermoso in Madrid, Spain.

== Activity ==
The first edition took place in 1979 at Estadio de Vallehermoso. In 1994, the meeting moved to the recently built Estadio de la Comunidad de Madrid. When this stadium closed for major reforms in 2004, the meeting went back to Vallehermoso until 2007, when the stadium was demolished and the meeting moved again, this time to Centro Deportivo Municipal Moratalaz. In 2019, Estadio de Vallehermoso reopened after reconstruction and the meeting went back to its original site. Until 2020, the meeting was part of the IAAF World Challenge and is now a World Athletics Continental Tour Silver meeting.

== World records ==
Over the course of its history, one world record has been set at the Meeting de Atletismo Madrid.

World records set at Meeting de Atletismo Madrid
Year	Event	Record	Athlete	Nationality
2005	Pole vault	4.95 m	Yelena Isinbayeva	Russia

== Meeting records ==
=== Men ===
Men's meeting records of the Meeting de Atletismo Madrid
Event	Record	Athlete	Nationality	Date	Ref.
100 m	9.87 (+1.8 m/s)	Nesta Carter	Jamaica	13 July 2013	
200 m	19.77 (±0.0 m/s)	Isaac Makwala	Botswana	14 July 2017	
400 m	43.90	Michael Johnson	United States	6 September 1994	
800 m	1:43.53	Djamel Sedjati	Algeria	19 July 2025	
1000 m	2:15.91	Vénuste Niyongabo	Burundi	6 September 1994	
1500 m	3:33.65	Robert Rono	Kenya	7 July 2001	
Mile	3:55.94	José Luis Carreira	Spain	9 June 1989	
2000 m	4:54.98	Saïd Aouita	Morocco	4 June 1985	
3000 m	7:37.49	Mushir Salem Jawher	Bahrain	17 July 2004	
5000 m	13:53.41	Jordi García	Spain	29 May 1984	
110 m hurdles	12.99	Colin Jackson	United Kingdom	6 September 1994	
400 m hurdles	47.56	Danny Harris	United States	4 June 1987	
2000 m steeplechase	5:25.35	Julius Korir	Kenya	20 June 1986	
3000 m steeplechase	8:21.94	Wesley Kiprotich	Kenya	5 July 2008	
High jump	2.37 m	Javier Sotomayor	Cuba	6 September 1994	
Pole vault	5.93 m	Aleksandr Averbukh	Israel	19 July 2003	
Long jump	8.50 m (+1.3 m/s)	Godfrey Mokoena	South Africa	4 July 2009	
Triple jump	17.69 m (+0.2 m/s)	Pedro Pichardo	Portugal	19 June 2021	
Shot put	22.22 m	Rajindra Campbell	Jamaica	22 July 2023	
Discus throw	70.67 m	Virgilijus Alekna	Lithuania	16 July 2005	
Hammer throw	80.85 m	Krisztián Pars	Hungary	7 July 2012	
Javelin throw	83.50 m	Juha Laukkanen	Finland	6 September 1994	
5000 m walk	21:34.01	Jesús Ángel García	Spain	6 September 1994	
4 × 100 m relay	38.30	Marius Broening; Tobias Unger; Alexander Kosenkow; Till Helmke	Germany	17 July 2004	
4 × 400 m relay	3:03.20	Lidio Andrés Feliz; Wilber Encarnacion; Luguelín Santos; Alexander Ogando	Dominican Republic	18 June 2021	
4 × 1500 m relay	14:46.16	Larios AAM Club Team	Spain	5 September 1997	

=== Women ===
Women's meeting records of the Meeting de Atletismo Madrid
Event	Record	Athlete	Nationality	Date	Ref.
100 m	10.83 (−0.1 m/s)	Shelly-Ann Fraser-Pryce	Jamaica	22 July 2023	
200 m	22.45	Galina Malchugina	Russia	3 June 1993	
400 m	50.07	Natalia Bukowiecka	Poland	19 July 2025	
800 m	1:55.55	María Mutola	Mozambique	19 July 2003	
1000 m	2:42.68	Letitia Vriesde	Suriname	9 June 1990	
1500 m	3:59.60	Gudaf Tsegay	Ethiopia	22 June 2018	
3000 m	8:37.68	Isabella Ochichi	Kenya	17 July 2004	
100 m hurdles	12.52	Ludmila Engquist	Sweden	12 June 1996	
400 m hurdles	53.67	Sandra Glover	United States	17 July 2004	
3000 m steeplechase	9:33.11	Nataliya Strebkova	Ukraine	18 June 2022	
High jump	2.06 m	Blanka Vlašić	Croatia	5 July 2008	
Pole vault	4.95 m	Yelena Isinbayeva	Russia	16 July 2005	
Long jump	7.23 m	Heike Drechsler	Germany	7 June 1991	
Triple jump	15.19 m (+1.4 m/s)	Yulimar Rojas	Venezuela	19 June 2021	
Shot put	20.79 m	Helena Fibingerová	Czechoslovakia	29 May 1984	
Discus throw	64.72 m	Yarelis Barrios	Cuba	2 July 2010	
Hammer throw	78.09 m	Camryn Rogers	Canada	19 July 2025	
Javelin throw	67.87 m	Osleidys Menéndez	Cuba	17 July 2004	
4 × 100 m relay	43.04	Virgen Benavides; Roxana Díaz; Dainelky Pérez; Misleidys Lazo	Cuba	17 July 2004	
4 × 400 m relay	3:38.18		Cuba	12 June 1992	
