= Fanny Blankers-Koen Games =

Athletics tournament held in Hengelo, Netherlands

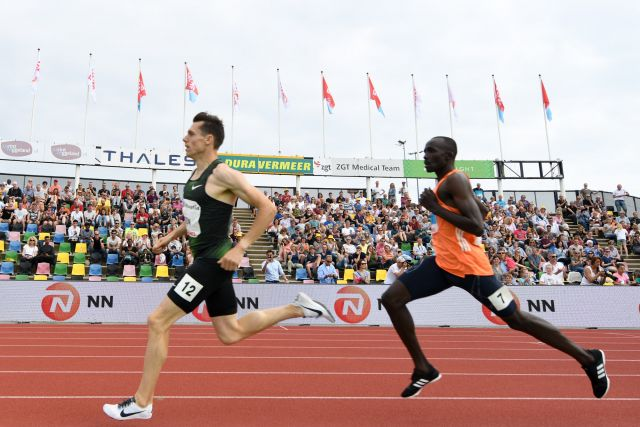
- Bram Som and Jonathan Kitilit during the 800 metres of the 2018 edition
- Date: May–August
- Location: Hengelo, Netherlands
- Event type: Track and field
- World Athletics Cat.: A
- Established: 6 June 1981
- Website: www.fbkgames.nl/en/

The Fanny Blankers-Koen Games, abbreviated as FBK Games, is an annual track and field event at the Fanny Blankers-Koen Stadion in Hengelo, Netherlands. It is named after Fanny Blankers-Koen in 1981, but was named Adriaan Paulen Memorial after Adriaan Paulen between 1987 and 2000. It has been part of the World Athletics Continental Tour since 2021.

== History ==
The first edition was organized on 6 June 1981. Its name honours Fanny Blankers-Koen, who won four gold medals at the 1948 Olympic Games.

It was known as the 'Adriaan Paulen Memorial' from 1987 to 2000, in memory of another Dutch athlete, but when Fanny Blankers-Koen was elected as the best female athlete of the 20th century by the IAAF in 2000, it was decided to use the original name "FBK-Games" again.

From 2003 to 2009 IAAF classified the FBK Games among IAAF Grand Prix meetings and from 2010 to 2019 it was a IAAF World Challenge meeting. The 2020 event was canceled due to the COVID-19 pandemic. Since 2021 it is a World Athletics Continental Tour Gold level meeting.

== World records ==
Over the course of its history, half a dozen world records have been set at the FBK Games.

World records set at the FBK Games
Year	Event	Record	Athlete	Nation	Ref.
1994	5000 m	12:56.96	Haile Gebrselassie	Ethiopia	
1995	10,000 m	26:43.53	Haile Gebrselassie	Ethiopia	
1997	Two miles	8:01.08	Haile Gebrselassie	Ethiopia	
1998	10,000 m	26:22.75	Haile Gebrselassie	Ethiopia	
2004	5000 m	12:37.35	Kenenisa Bekele	Ethiopia	
2021	10,000 m	29:06.82	Sifan Hassan	Netherlands	

== Meeting records ==
=== Men ===
Men's meeting records of the FBK Games
Event	Record	Athlete	Nationality	Date	Ref.
100 m	9.95 (+1.4 m/s)	Richard Thompson	Trinidad and Tobago	8 June 2014	
200 m	20.23 (+2.0 m/s)	Churandy Martina	Netherlands	8 June 2013	
400 m	44.35	Abdalleleh Haroun	Qatar	3 June 2018	
800 m	1:43.05	Wilfred Bungei	Kenya	1 June 2003	
1000 m	2:14.37	Niels Laros	Netherlands	7 July 2024	
1500 m	3:29.51	Hicham El Guerrouj	Morocco	31 May 1997	
Mile	3:50.39	James Kwalia	Kenya	1 June 2003	
3000 m	7:29.49	Haile Gebrselassie	Ethiopia	27 May 1996	
Two miles	8:01.08	Haile Gebrselassie	Ethiopia	31 May 1997	
5000 m	12:37.35	Kenenisa Bekele	Ethiopia	31 May 2004	
10,000 m	26:22.75	Haile Gebrselassie	Ethiopia	1 June 1998	
One hour	20,822.36 m	Haile Gebrselassie	Ethiopia	1 June 2009	
110 m hurdles	13.03 (+0.4 m/s)	Grant Holloway	United States	4 June 2023	
400 m hurdles	48.08	Edwin Moses	United States	19 July 1987	
3000 m steeplechase	8:01.05	Paul Kipsiele Koech	Kenya	26 May 2007	
High jump	2.33 m	Andriy Protsenko	Ukraine	8 June 2014	
Pole vault	6.11 m	Armand Duplantis	Sweden	4 June 2023	
Long jump	8.73 m (+1.2 m/s)	Irving Saladino	Panama	24 May 2008	
Triple jump	17.57 m (+1.7 m/s)	Hugues Fabrice Zango	Burkina Faso	7 July 2024	
Shot put	21.87 m	Reese Hoffa	United States	28 May 2011	
Discus throw	71.84 m	Piotr Małachowski	Poland	8 June 2013	
Hammer throw	80.90 m	Igor Astapkovich	Belarus	28 May 2000	
Javelin throw	90.75 m	Anderson Peters	Grenada	6 June 2022	
4 × 100 m relay	38.29	Santa Monica Track Club	United States	4 June 1994	
4 × 200 m relay	1:20.43	Santa Monica Track Club	United States	13 August 1989	
4 × 400 m relay	3:09.59	Dutch national team	Netherlands	19 July 1987	

=== Women ===
Women's meeting records of the FBK Games
Event	Record	Athlete	Nationality	Date	Ref.
100 m	10.92 (+0.8 m/s)	Dina Asher-Smith	Great Britain	6 June 2021	
200 m	22.02 (−0.3 m/s)	Dafne Schippers	Netherlands	22 May 2016	
400 m	50.02	Femke Bol	Netherlands	7 July 2024	
800 m	1:55.76	Pamela Jelimo	Kenya	24 May 2008	
1000 m	2:34.65	Mary Decker	United States	19 July 1987	
1500 m	3:56.14	Sifan Hassan	Netherlands	11 June 2017	
Mile	4:25.71	Jennifer Simpson	United States	3 June 2018	
2000 m	5:40.71	Elly van Hulst	Netherlands	13 August 1989	
3000 m	8:30.43	Zahra Ouaziz	Morocco	1 June 1998	
5000 m	14:35.37	Meseret Defar	Ethiopia	28 May 2006	
10,000 m	29:06.82	Sifan Hassan	Netherlands	6 June 2021	
100 m hurdles	12.39 (+1.6 m/s)	Jasmine Camacho-Quinn	Puerto Rico	7 July 2024	
400 m hurdles	52.51	Femke Bol	Netherlands	9 June 2025	
3000 m steeplechase	9:07.06	Sofia Assefa	Ethiopia	11 June 2017	
High jump	2.04 m	Mariya Lasitskene	Russia	11 June 2017	
Pole vault	4.90 m	Yarisley Silva	Cuba	8 June 2013	
Long jump	6.88 m NWI	Larissa Berezhnaya	Soviet Union	13 August 1989	
Triple jump	14.63 m (+1.7 m/s)	Caterine Ibarguen	Colombia	8 June 2014	
Shot put	20.86 m	Astrid Kumbernuss	Germany	31 May 1997	
Discus throw	67.42 m	Ilke Wyludda	Germany	25 June 1991	
Hammer throw	71.54 m	Manuela Montebrun	France	1 June 2003	
Javelin throw	63.90 m	Tatsiana Khaladovich	Belarus	11 June 2017	
4 × 100 m relay	42.25	Alexandra Burghardt; Lisa Mayer; Gina Lückenkemper; Rebekka Haase	Germany	11 June 2017	
