= Grande Prêmio Brasil Caixa de Atletismo =

Athletics tournament held in Brazil

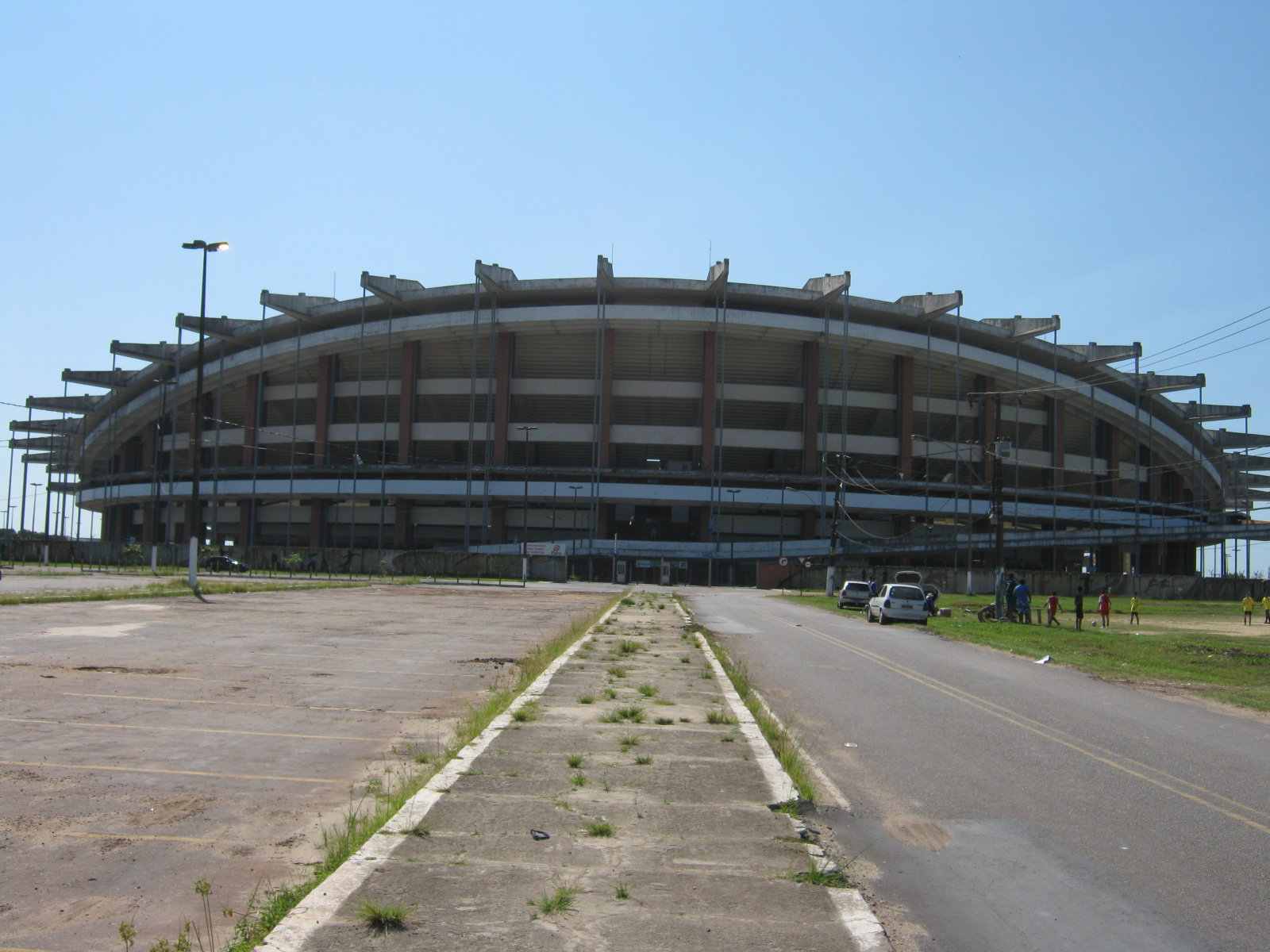
- The current host stadium – Estádio Olímpico do Pará
- Date: May
- Location: São Paulo, Brazil
- Event type: Track and field
- Established: 1985
- Website: Grande Prêmio Brasil Caixa de Atletismo

The Grande Prêmio Brasil Caixa de Atletismo (or Grande Prêmio Internacional Brasil Loterias Caixa de Atletismo) is an annual athletics event in São Paulo, Brazil as part of the World Athletics Continental Tour. It was first organized in 1985, held at the Estádio Ícaro de Castro Melo, São Paulo. From 1998 to 2009 IAAF classified the Grande Prêmio Brasil Caixa de Atletismo among IAAF Grand Prix meetings. From 2010 to 2019 it was part of the IAAF World Challenge.

== Editions ==
Editions of Grande Prêmio Brasil Caixa de Atletismo
Year	Edition	City	Stadium	Circuit	Date	Ref.
1985	I	São Paulo	Estádio Ícaro de Castro Melo	Meeting Internacional de São Paulo	10 June	
1986	II	São Paulo	Estádio Ícaro de Castro Melo	Meeting Internacional de São Paulo	21 September	
1987	III	São Paulo	Estádio Ícaro de Castro Melo	Meeting Internacional de São Paulo		
1988	IV	São Paulo	Estádio Ícaro de Castro Melo	Meeting Internacional de São Paulo		
1989	V	São Paulo	Estádio Ícaro de Castro Melo	Meeting Internacional de São Paulo		
1990	VI	São Paulo	Estádio Ícaro de Castro Melo	IAAF Grand Prix	20 May	
1991	VII	São Paulo	Estádio Ícaro de Castro Melo	IAAF Grand Prix	19 May	
1992	VIII	São Paulo	Estádio Ícaro de Castro Melo	IAAF Grand Prix	17 May	
1993	IX	São Paulo	Estádio Ícaro de Castro Melo	IAAF Grand Prix	16 May	
1994	X	São Paulo	Estádio Ícaro de Castro Melo	IAAF Grand Prix	21 May	
1995	XI	São Paulo	Estádio Ícaro de Castro Melo	IAAF Grand Prix	14 May	
1996	XII	Rio de Janeiro	Estádio Célio de Barros	IAAF Grand Prix	4 May	
1997	XIII	Rio de Janeiro	Estádio Célio de Barros	IAAF Grand Prix	4 May	
1998	XIV	Rio de Janeiro	Estádio Célio de Barros	IAAF Grand Prix	3 May	
1999	XV	Rio de Janeiro	Estádio Célio de Barros	IAAF Grand Prix	25 April	
2000	XVI	Rio de Janeiro	Estádio Célio de Barros	IAAF Grand Prix	14 May	
2001	XVII	Rio de Janeiro	Estádio Célio de Barros	IAAF Grand Prix	6 May	
2002	XVIII	Belém	Estádio Olímpico do Pará	IAAF Grand Prix	5 May	
2003	XIX	Belém	Estádio Olímpico do Pará	IAAF Grand Prix	4 May	
2004	XX	Belém	Estádio Olímpico do Pará	IAAF Grand Prix	23 May	
2005	XXI	Belém	Estádio Olímpico do Pará	IAAF Grand Prix	22 May	
2006	XXII	Belém	Estádio Olímpico do Pará	IAAF Grand Prix	21 May	
2007	XXIII	Belém	Estádio Olímpico do Pará	IAAF Grand Prix	20 May	
2008	XXIV	Belém	Estádio Olímpico do Pará	IAAF Grand Prix	25 May	
2009	XXV	Belém	Estádio Olímpico do Pará	IAAF Grand Prix	24 May	
2010	XXVI	Rio de Janeiro	Estádio Olímpico João Havelange	IAAF World Challenge	23 May	
2011	XXVII	Rio de Janeiro	Estádio Olímpico João Havelange	IAAF World Challenge	26 May	
2012	XXVIII	Rio de Janeiro	Estádio Olímpico João Havelange	IAAF World Challenge	20 May	
2013	XXIX	Belém	Estádio Olímpico do Pará	IAAF World Challenge	12 May	
2014	XXX	Belém	Estádio Olímpico do Pará	IAAF World Challenge	10 August	
2015		no edition				
2016	XXXI	São Bernardo do Campo	Arena Caixa Atletismo	IAAF World Challenge	19 June	
2017	XXXII	São Bernardo do Campo	Arena Caixa Atletismo	IAAF World Challenge	3 June	
2018	XXXIII	Bragança Paulista	National Athletics Development Centre's (CNDA) Stadium	IAAF World Challenge	8 July	
2019	XXXIV	Bragança Paulista	National Athletics Development Centre's (CNDA) Stadium	IAAF World Challenge	28 April	
2020	XXXV	Bragança Paulista	National Athletics Development Centre's (CNDA) Stadium	World Athletics Continental Tour	6 December	
2021		no edition				
2022	XXXVI	São Paulo	COTP Stadium	World Athletics Continental Tour	1 May	
2023	XXXVII	São Paulo	COTP Stadium	World Athletics Continental Tour	10 May	
2024	XXXVIII	Cuiabá	Universidade Federal de Mato Grosso	World Athletics Continental Tour	15 May	
2024	XXXIX	Niterói	Universidade Federal Fluminense	World Athletics Continental Tour	19 May	
2025	XXXX	Bragança Paulista	National Athletics Development Centre's (CNDA) Stadium	World Athletics Continental Tour	24 August	

== Meeting records ==
=== Men ===
Men's meeting records of Grande Prêmio Brasil Caixa de Atletismo
Event	Record	Athlete	Nationality	Date	Ref.
100 m	9.99 (−0.3 m/s)	Daniel Bailey	Antigua and Barbuda	24 May 2009	
200 m	20.02 (+0.5 m/s)	Michael Johnson	United States	19 May 1991	
400 m	44.45	Leonard Byrd	United States	5 May 2002	
800 m	1:44.52	Gilbert Kipchoge	Kenya	25 May 2008	
1000 m	2:18.70	Justus Koech	Kenya	21 May 2006	
1500 m	3:34.99	Noureddine Morceli	Algeria	3 May 1998	
3000 m	7:43.15	Simon Chemoiywo	Kenya	14 May 1995	
5000 m	13:17.64	Abraham Chebii	Kenya	23 May 2010	
10,000 m	28:21.25	Robert Kipngetich	Kenya	24 May 2009	
110 m hurdles	13.30 (−0.8 m/s)	Jack Pierce	United States	14 May 1995	
110 m hurdles	13.30 (+0.5 m/s)	Redelén dos Santos	Brazil	22 May 2005	
110 m hurdles	13.30 (+1.8 m/s)	LaFranz Clifton Campbell	Jamaica	24 August 2025	
400 m hurdles	48.12	Samuel Matete	Zambia	4 May 1996	
3000 m steeplechase	8:26.95	Patrick Langat	Kenya	25 May 2008	
High jump	2.36 m	Javier Sotomayor	Cuba	21 May 1994	
Pole vault	5.92 m	Dean Starkey	United States	21 May 1994	
Long jump	8.51 m (+1.7 m/s)	Roland McGhee	United States	14 May 1995	
Triple jump	17.90 m (+0.4 m/s)	Jadel Gregório	Brazil	20 May 2007	
Shot put	21.82 m	Darlan Romani	Brazil	3 June 2017	
Discus throw	67.02 m	Attila Horvath	Hungary	19 May 1991	
Hammer throw	79.90 m	Primož Kozmus	Slovenia	24 May 2009	
Javelin throw	88.20 m	Jan Železný	Czech Republic	14 May 1995	
4 × 100 m relay	38.63	Carlos Roberto Pio de Moraes Junior; Sandro Viana; Nilson André; Diego Cavalcanti	Brazil	20 May 2012	
4 × 400 m relay	3:01.88	Albert Bravo; Arturo Ramirez; Jose Meléndez; Omar Longart	Venezuela	20 May 2012	

=== Women ===
Women's meeting records of Grande Prêmio Brasil Caixa de Atletismo
Event	Record	Athlete	Nationality	Date	Ref.
100 m	11.05 (+1.7 m/s)	Ana Cláudia Lemos	Brazil	12 May 2013	
200 m	22.43 (−2.0 m/s)	Gwen Torrence	United States	14 May 1995	
400 m	50.38	Rochelle Stevens	United States	17 May 1992	
800 m	1:57.38	Maria Mutola	Mozambique	16 May 1993	
1500 m	4:12.03	Mardrea Hyman	Jamaica	5 May 2002	
3000 m	8:52.16	Daisy Jepkemei	Kenya	28 April 2019	
100 m hurdles	12.64 (+0.7 m/s)	Brigitte Foster	Jamaica	5 May 2002	
100 m hurdles	12.64	Priscilla Lopes	Canada	20 May 2007	
400 m hurdles	53.56	Lashinda Demus	United States	22 May 2005	
2000 m steeplechase	6:26.11	Tatiane Raquel da Silva	Brazil	24 August 2025	
3000 m steeplechase	9:31.03	Salima El Ouali Alami	Morocco	20 May 2012	
High jump	2.00 m	Stefka Kostadinova	Bulgaria	21 September 1986	
Pole vault	4.75 m	Fabiana Murer	Brazil	23 May 2010	
Long jump	7.10 m (+1.6 m/s)	Inessa Kravets	Ukraine	20 May 1990	
Triple jump	14.81 m (+1.7 m/s)	Trecia Smith	Jamaica	22 May 2005	
Shot put	20.73 m	Vita Pavlysh	Ukraine	4 May 1997	
Discus throw	66.67 m	Yelena Antonova	Ukraine	14 May 2000	
Hammer throw	78.00 m	Anita Włodarczyk	Poland	3 June 2017	
Javelin throw	62.52 m	Jucilene Sales de Lima	Brazil	15 May 2024	
4 × 100 m relay	43.01	Ana Cláudia Lemos; Vanda Ferreira Gomes; Evelyn dos Santos; Rosângela Santos	Brazil	20 May 2012	
4 × 400 m relay	3:31.79	Geisa Coutinho; Lucimar Teodoro; Joelma Sousa; Jailma de Lima	Brazil	20 May 2012	
