= 2015 IAAF Hammer Throw Challenge =

- Edition: 6th
- Dates: 21 March–13 September
- Meetings: 14

The 2015 IAAF Hammer Throw Challenge was the sixth edition of the annual, global series of hammer throw competitions organised by the International Association of Athletics Federations. The winners were Paweł Fajdek (248.01 metres) and Anita Włodarczyk (235.28 metres), both of Poland. This was Włodarczyk's third straight title and Fajdek's second title, after his win in 2013. Fajdek and Włodarczyk each improved the challenge record totals. Włodarczyk twice broke the hammer throw world record that year, but these marks were achieved outside of the series.

A total of fourteen meetings featured on the circuit, with nine women's and ten men's contests spread across those events. The point scoring format was cumulative – the final standings were decided by the sum of athletes' three best throws on the circuit. Only the best throw by an athlete from each meet was taken into consideration.

== Calendar ==
The 2015 series continued the model of the 2013 by featuring a combination of IAAF World Challenge meetings and non-IAAF meetings in Europe.

The IAAF Melbourne World Challenge became the first Oceanian leg to the series and made the series the longest yet, with its March date. The Brothers Znamensky Memorial and Meeting Grand Prix IAAF de Dakar returned to the series. Performances at the 2015 World Championships in Athletics also counted towards the series total, as they had in 2013. The Ponce Grand Prix de Atletismo, Meeting de Atletismo Madrid, and Moscow Challenge were all dropped from the schedule.

Meeting	City	Country	Date	Type
IAAF Melbourne World Challenge	Melbourne	Australia	21 March	Men
Golden Grand Prix	Kawasaki	Japan	11 May	Women
IAAF World Challenge Beijing	Beijing	China	20 May	Women
IAAF World Challenge Dakar	Dakar	Senegal	23 May	Women
Golden Spike Ostrava	Ostrava	Czech Republic	26 May	Both
Meeting International Mohammed VI d'Athlétisme de Rabat	Rabat	Morocco	14 June	Men
Paavo Nurmi Games	Turku	Finland	25 June	Men
István Gyulai Memorial	Székesfehérvár	Hungary	7 July	Both
Brothers Znamensky Memorial	Zhukovsky	Russia	18 July	Both
Karlstad Grand Prix	Karlstad	Sweden	22 July	Men
Janusz Kusociński Memorial	Szczecin	Poland	9 August	Both
2015 World Championships in Athletics	Beijing	China	22–30 August	Men & Women
Internationales Stadionfest	Berlin	Germany	6 September	Women
Rieti Meeting	Rieti	Italy	13 September	Men

== Final standings ==
=== Men ===
A total of ten men recorded valid marks at three or more meetings and made the final standings. Marks in bold are those which counted towards the final score.

Rank	Athlete	Nation	Melbourne	Ostrava	Rabat	Turku	Székes-fehérvár	Zhukovsky	Karlstad	Szczecin	WC	Rieti	Final score
1	Paweł Fajdek	Poland	-	80.75	79.90	80.71	**83.12**	-	-	**83.93**	80.88	**80.96**	248.01
2	Dilshod Nazarov	Tajikistan	-	**79.36**	76.95	77.47	76.88	**78.29**	77.95	-	**78.55**	75.98	236.20
3	Krisztián Pars	Hungary	-	**77.71**	**77.81**	77.70	**79.23**	-	-	-	77.32	-	234.75
4	Sergey Litvinov	Russia	-	75.12	73.77	74.30	**76.91**	**77.00**	-	74.89	**77.24**	75.94	231.15
5	Mostafa Al-Gamel	Egypt	-	**77.06**	76.51	**77.17**	-	-	-	-	**76.81**	-	231.04
6	Marcel Lomnický	Slovakia	-	**76.16**	73.56	71.97	-	**77.50**	**76.48**	75.03	75.79	75.96	230.14
7	Wojciech Nowicki	Poland	-	75.37	75.31	74.46	**76.09**	-	-	75.01	**78.55**	**75.40**	230.04
8	Nick Miller	Great Britain	-	-	-	-	-	-	**77.55**	**75.56**	**72.94**	-	226.05
9	Ashraf Amgad Elseify	Qatar	-	-	-	**74.12**	-	72.26	**74.93**	-	**74.09**	-	223.14
10	Lukáš Melich	Czech Republic	-	**75.38**	-	-	**73.98**	-	**73.54**	71.26	-	67.66	222.90

=== Women ===
A total of fourteen women recorded valid marks at three or more meetings and made the final standings – a new high for the competition. Marks in bold are those which counted towards the final score.

Rank	Athlete	Nation	Kawasaki	Beijing	Dakar	Ostrava	Székesfehérvár	Zhukovsky	Szczecin	WC	Berlin	Final score
1	Anita Włodarczyk	Poland	-	**77.73**	-	76.61	75.48	-	**76.70**	**80.85**	-	235.28
2	Betty Heidler	Germany	-	-	-	**75.00**	**73.91**	-	**73.37**	72.56	-	222.28
3	Martina Hrašnová	Slovakia	**74.27**	**73.80**	-	**74.13**	67.26	-	68.18	-	-	222.20
4	Wang Zheng	China	**73.68**	**73.99**	-	72.83	-	-	-	**73.83**	-	221.50
5	Kathrin Klaas	Germany	-	-	-	**72.49**	62.10	-	71.76	**73.18**	**72.09**	217.76
6	Sophie Hitchon	Great Britain	69.45	-	-	-	**70.19**	-	**72.23**	**73.86**	-	216.28
7	Sultana Frizell	Canada	**73.66**	**71.23**	-	**70.94**	-	-	-	-	-	215.83
8	Amanda Bingson	United States	-	68.48	-	**70.94**	**70.74**	-	-	**72.35**	-	214.03
9	Joanna Fiodorow	Poland	**70.10**	**71.67**	-	68.68	**71.18**	-	67.26	-	67.11	212.95
10	Gwen Berry	United States	**70.84**	**72.26**	**69.50**	-	-	-	69.29	-	-	212.60
11	Amber Campbell	United States	-	**69.39**	-	-	**69.26**	-	-	-	**70.94**	209.59
12	Alena Sobaleva	Belarus	-	-	-	-	-	**69.95**	-	**70.09**	**67.12**	207.16
13	Éva Orbán	Hungary	-	**70.14**	-	-	**69.25**	-	-	-	**65.02**	204.41
14	Iryna Novozhylova	Ukraine	**66.86**	-	**67.50**	-	-	**67.77**	-	-	-	202.13

== See also ==
- 2015 IAAF Diamond League
