= IAAF Hammer Throw Challenge =

Annual international hammer throw competitions

- Sport: Hammer throw
- Founded: 2010
- Ceased: 2019
- Continent: Global
- Official website: Hammer Throw

The IAAF Hammer Throw Challenge was an annual hammer throw series, organized by the International Association of Athletics Federations (IAAF) from 2010 until the end of 2019 season. The series of hammer throw competitions for men and women were primary held at meetings with IAAF World Challenge status. The rankings were decided by combining the total (in metres) of each athlete's three greatest throws at the permit events during the season. Further points could be gained by those who broke or equalled the world record mark for the event.

The competition's creation was a result of the IAAF Golden League being replaced by the IAAF Diamond League in 2010 – hammer throw was the sole track and field event not to feature on the new top level circuit. The challenge was designed to allow hammer throwers to compete in a global seasonal competition, similar to that found for other track and field events on the Diamond League. In 2020, World Athletics launched the World Continental Tour including hammer throw competitions.

The total prize money available in 2010 was US$202,000, split evenly between male and female athletes. The male and female winners each received $30,000, while second and third placed athletes were entitled to $20,000 and $14,000 respectively. Increasingly smaller prizes were given to the remaining throwers who rank in the top twelve. The eleven meetings which had permit status in 2010 offered either a men's contest, a women's contest, or both – an arrangement which gave athletes of each sex a total of seven opportunities to score points for the challenge.

The most successful athlete of the series was Poland's Anita Włodarczyk, who won the women's title six times straight from 2013 to 2018. Her compatriot Paweł Fajdek was the most successful man, with five victories. Germany's Betty Heidler and Hungarian Krisztián Pars have each won the title on three occasions. Fajdek holds the men's series record score of 248.48 metres while Włodarczyk is the women's series record holder with 240.44 metres.

== Editions ==
IAAF Hammer Throw Challenge editions
Ed.	Year	Start date	End date	Meets	Ref.
1	2010	24 April	1 September	11	
2	2011	8 May	13 September	9	
3	2012	6 May	9 September	8	
4	2013	5 May	8 September	15	
5	2014	11 May	7 September	13	
6	2015	21 March	13 September	14	
7	2016	5 March	19 August	11	
8	2017	21 May	11 August	9	
9	2018	19 May	22 August	10	
10	2019	28 April	2 October	10	

== Meetings ==
Key:

- M : Men
- W : Men
- B : Both

IAAF Hammer Throw Challenge meetings
#	Meeting	Arena	City	Country	2010	2011	2012	2013	2014	2015	2016	2017	2018	2019
1	IAAF World Challenge Dakar	Stade Léopold Sédar Senghor	Dakar	Senegal	W	W		W		W	B			
2	Golden Grand Prix Osaka	Yanmar Stadium Nagai	Osaka	Japan	M	M	M	M	W	W		W	M	W
3	Colorful Daegu Championships Meeting	Daegu Stadium	Daegu	South Korea	W	W	W							
4	Grande Premio Brasil Caixa de Atletismo	Estádio Olímpico Nilton Santos	Rio de Janeiro	Brazil	B	B	B				W	W	M	M
5	Golden Spike Ostrava	Městský stadion	Ostrava	Czech Republic	B	B	B	B	B	B	B	B	B	W
6	Fanny Blankers-Koen Games	Fanny Blankers-Koen Stadion	Hengelo	Netherlands	M									
7	Paavo Nurmi Games	Paavo Nurmi Stadium	Turku	Finland					M	M	M	M	M	W
8	Brothers Znamensky Memorial	Meteor Stadium	Zhukovsky	Russia	W	B				B				
9	Gyulai István Memorial	Bregyó közi Regionális Atlétika Központ	Székesfehérvár	Hungary				M	B	B	B	W	W	B
10	Meeting de Atletismo Madrid	Centro Deportivo Moratalaz	Madrid	Spain	M	M	M		M			M	W	
11	ISTAF Berlin	Olympiastadion	Berlin	Germany	W		W	W	W	W				
12	Rieti Meeting	Stadio Raul Guidobaldi	Rieti	Italy	B	B	B	B	M	M				
13	Hanžeković Memorial	Sportski Park Mladost	Zagreb	Croatia	M	M	M							
14	Ponce Grand Prix de Atletismo	Estadio Francisco Montaner	Ponce	Puerto Rico				M	B					
15	IAAF World Challenge Beijing	Beijing National Stadium	Beijing	China				W	W	W	W			
16	Prefontaine Classic	Hayward Field	Eugene	United States				W			M			
17	Moscow Challenge	Luzhniki Stadium	Moscow	Russia				W	B					
18	Janusz Kusociński Memorial	City Athletics Stadium	Szczecin	Poland				B	M	B	B	B	B	B
19	Karlstad Grand Prix	Tingvalla IP	Karlstad	Sweden				M	M	M				
20	World Championships	Varies	Varies	Varies				B		B		B		B
21	Rabat Meeting	Prince Moulay Abdellah Stadium	Rabat	Morocco					W	M				
22	Melbourne Track Classic	Lakeside Stadium	Melbourne	Australia						M	M			
23	Jamaica International Invitational	Independence Park	Kingston	Jamaica							W		W	
24	Olympic Games	Varies	Varies	Varies							B			
25	PTS Meeting Šamorín	x-bionic sphere	Šamorín	Slovakia								B	M	
26	Kamila Skolimowska Memorial	Silesian Stadium	Chorzów	Poland									W	
27	Nanjing World Challenge	Nanjing Olympic Sports Centre	Nanjing	China										W
28	European Athletics Festival Bydgoszcz	Zdzisław Krzyszkowiak Stadium	Bydgoszcz	Poland										M
29	Pál Németh Memorial	IAAF Training Centre	Szombathely	Hungary										B

- The Osaka meet was held at the Kawasaki Todoroki Stadium in Kawasaki, Kanagawa in 2011, 2012, 2015 and 2017, and was held at the National Stadium in Tokyo in 2013 and 2014
- The 2013 Gyulai István Memorial was held in Budapest
- The 2014 Rabat meeting was held in Marrakesh
- The Brazilian meet was held at the Arena Caixa Atletismo in São Bernardo do Campo in 2016 and 2017, and at the National Training Centre in Bragança Paulista in 2018 and 2019
- The 2018 and 2019 Janusz Kusociński Memorial was held at the Silesian Stadium in Chorzów

== Medalists ==
=== Men ===
Year	Gold		Silver		Bronze	
2010	Koji Murofushi; Japan (JPN)	238.52	Dilshod Nazarov; Tajikistan (TJK)	236.02	Libor Charfreitag; Slovakia (SVK)	235.26
2011	Krisztián Pars; Hungary (HUN)	239.03	Dilshod Nazarov; Tajikistan (TJK)	235.72	Primož Kozmus; Slovenia (SLO)	233.90
2012	Krisztián Pars; Hungary (HUN)	242.35	Paweł Fajdek; Poland (POL)	236.47	Aleksey Sokirskiy; Ukraine (UKR)	233.39
2013	Paweł Fajdek; Poland (POL)	244.23	Krisztián Pars; Hungary (HUN)	244.17	Lukáš Melich; Czech Republic (CZE)	239.80
2014	Krisztián Pars; Hungary (HUN)	244.84	Paweł Fajdek; Poland (POL)	241.49	Dilshod Nazarov; Tajikistan (TJK)	241.37
2015	Paweł Fajdek; Poland (POL)	248.01	Dilshod Nazarov; Tajikistan (TJK)	236.20	Krisztián Pars; Hungary (HUN)	234.75
2016	Paweł Fajdek; Poland (POL)	242.89	Dilshod Nazarov; Tajikistan (TJK)	236.37	Wojciech Nowicki; Poland (POL)	232.63
2017	Paweł Fajdek; Poland (POL)	248.48	Wojciech Nowicki; Poland (POL)	236.32	Dilshod Nazarov; Tajikistan (TJK)	231.40
2018	Wojciech Nowicki; Poland (POL)	241.89	Paweł Fajdek; Poland (POL)	240.04	Bence Halász; Hungary (HUN)	232.46
2019	Paweł Fajdek; Poland (POL)	241.86	Wojciech Nowicki; Poland (POL)	237.47	Bence Halász; Hungary (HUN)	234.99

=== Women ===
Year	Gold		Silver		Bronze	
2010	Betty Heidler; Germany (GER)	225.88	Anita Włodarczyk; Poland (POL)	225.30	Tatyana Lysenko; Russia (RUS)	223.96
2011	Betty Heidler; Germany (GER)	228.09	Yipsi Moreno; Cuba (CUB)	220.46	Kathrin Klaas; Germany (GER)	219.77
2012	Betty Heidler; Germany (GER)	230.49	Anita Włodarczyk; Poland (POL)	223.13	Tatyana Lysenko; Russia (RUS)	222.05
2013	Anita Włodarczyk; Poland (POL)	233.83	Tatyana Lysenko; Russia (RUS)	227.59	Betty Heidler; Germany (GER)	226.93
2014	Anita Włodarczyk; Poland (POL)	232.52	Betty Heidler; Germany (GER)	228.54	Kathrin Klaas; Germany (GER)	222.65
2015	Anita Włodarczyk; Poland (POL)	235.28	Betty Heidler; Germany (GER)	222.28	Martina Hrašnová; Slovakia (SVK)	222.20
2016	Anita Włodarczyk; Poland (POL)	240.44	Sophie Hitchon; Great Britain & N.I. (GBR)	218.11	Zalina Petrivskaya; Moldova (MDA)	217.80
2017	Anita Włodarczyk; Poland (POL)	235.62	Wang Zheng; China (CHN)	225.77	Hanna Skydan; Azerbaijan (AZE)	221.75
2018	Anita Włodarczyk; Poland (POL)	228.12	Gwen Berry; United States (USA)	223.31	Joanna Fiodorow; Poland (POL)	222.03
2019	DeAnna Price; United States (USA)	226.55	Wang Zheng; China (CHN)	226.34	Joanna Fiodorow; Poland (POL)	224.46

== See also ==
- IAAF Race Walking Challenge
- IAAF World Cross Challenge
- IAAF Combined Events Challenge
