= 2014 IAAF Hammer Throw Challenge =

- Edition: 5th
- Dates: 11 May–7 September
- Meetings: 13
- Records set: 79.58 m (Anita Włodarczyk)

The 2014 IAAF Hammer Throw Challenge was the fifth edition of the annual, global series of hammer throw competitions organised by the International Association of Athletics Federations. The winners were Krisztián Pars of Hungary (244.84 metres) and Anita Włodarczyk (232.52 metres) of Poland. This was Włodarczyk's second title, defending her win from the previous year, and a third career win for Pars (the 2011 and 2012 winner). Pars also regained the position of challenge record holder, improving on the total set by Paweł Fajdek in 2013. Włodarczyk was the stand out courtesy of her hammer throw world record of 79.58 m (261 ft 1 in) at the ISTAF Berlin meet.

A total of thirteen meetings featured on the circuit, with eight women's and nine men's contests spread across those events. The point scoring format was cumulative – the final standings were decided by the sum of athletes' three best throws on the circuit. Only the best throw by an athlete from each meet was taken into consideration.

== Calendar ==
The 2014 series continued the model of the 2013 by featuring a combination of IAAF World Challenge meetings and non-IAAF meetings in Europe.

There were two new additions to the tour: the Mohammed VI Meeting de Marrakesh and the Paavo Nurmi Games. The Grande Premio Brasil Caixa de Atletismo and Meeting Grand Prix IAAF de Dakar – long-standing presences – were dropped from the series. The Prefontaine Classic, a Diamond League meeting, did not return.

Meeting	City	Country	Date	Type
Golden Grand Prix	Tokyo	Japan	11 May	Women
Ponce Grand Prix de Atletismo	Ponce	Puerto Rico	17 May	Both
IAAF World Challenge Beijing	Beijing	China	21 May	Women
Janusz Kusociński Memorial	Szczecin	Poland	7 June	Men
Mohammed VI Meeting de Marrakesh	Marrakesh	Morocco	8 June	Women
Moscow Challenge	Moscow	Russia	11 June	Both
Golden Spike Ostrava	Ostrava	Czech Republic	17 June	Both
Paavo Nurmi Games	Turku	Finland	25 June	Men
István Gyulai Memorial	Székesfehérvár	Hungary	8 July	Both
Karlstad Grand Prix	Karlstad	Sweden	16 July	Men
Meeting de Atletismo Madrid	Madrid	Spain	19 July	Men
Internationales Stadionfest	Berlin	Germany	31 August	Women
Rieti Meeting	Rieti	Italy	6 September	Men

== Final standings ==
=== Men ===
A total of eleven men recorded valid marks at three meetings and made the final standings. Marks in bold are those which counted towards the final score.

Rank	Athlete	Nation	Ponce	Szczecin	Moscow	Ostrava	Turku	Székesfehérvár	Karlstad	Madrid	Rieti	Final score
1	Krisztián Pars	Hungary	79.31	79.35	-	**81.57**	79.83	**82.49**	-	-	**80.78**	244.84
2	Paweł Fajdek	Poland	-	78.15	-	**79.65**	-	**80.73**	-	-	**81.11**	241.49
3	Dilshod Nazarov	Tajikistan	-	78.08	79.20	**80.62**	77.93	**80.24**	79.62	**80.51**	-	241.37
4	Mostafa Al-Gamel	Egypt	-	-	-	75.66	73.88	**78.07**	-	**78.23**	**78.50**	234.80
5	Marcel Lomnický	Slovakia	77.48	**78.40**	-	**77.91**	-	75.90	**77.93**	-	76.39	234.24
6	Pavel Kryvitski	Belarus	-	**77.69**	**78.22**	-	-	76.68	-	-	**76.85**	232.76
7	Sergey Litvinov	Russia	-	-	-	-	74.71	**74.81**	**74.94**	-	**75.88**	225.63
8	Szymon Ziółkowski	Poland	-	**74.39**	**75.37**	-	73.56	73.50	**75.40**	-	72.56	225.16
9	Aleksiy Sokirskiy	Ukraine	-	-	**75.34**	**75.89**	-	**73.28**	-	-	-	224.51
10	Markus Esser	Germany	-	**75.29**	-	-	**74.27**	**74.28**	-	-	-	223.84
11	Lukáš Melich	Czech Republic	-	-	-	**72.75**	-	**71.25**	-	**71.86**	-	215.86

=== Women ===
A total of twelve women recorded valid marks at three meetings and made the final standings. Marks in bold are those which counted towards the final score.

Rank	Athlete	Nation	Tokyo	Ponce	Beijing	Marrakesh	Moscow	Ostrava	Székesfehérvár	Berlin	Final score
1	Anita Włodarczyk	Poland	-	-	-	-	-	**76.41**	**75.53**	**79.58**	232.52
2	Betty Heidler	Germany	**72.69**	-	-	-	-	**78.00**	**75.34**	75.20	228.54
3	Kathrin Klaas	Germany	-	-	-	73.38	-	**74.61**	**74.62**	**73.42**	222.65
4	Wang Zheng	China	-	-	**75.23**	-	**73.89**	-	-	**72.33**	221.45
5	Martina Hrašnová	Slovakia	-	-	**71.89**	-	70.88	**74.39**	**72.56**	71.82	218.84
6	Amanda Bingson	United States	**71.71**	**72.16**	-	**70.42**	-	-	-	-	214.29
7	Joanna Fiodorow	Poland	-	-	-	-	-	**71.80**	**70.24**	**71.04**	213.08
8	Gwen Berry	United States	**71.13**	**71.46**	-	**69.15**	-	-	-	-	211.74
9	Éva Orbán	Hungary	-	-	**69.63**	-	**70.60**	68.70	**70.45**	-	210.68
10	Bianca Perie	Romania	-	-	-	**70.57**	**68.93**	-	**70.19**	-	209.69
11	Jeneva Stevens	United States	**69.18**	**70.78**	-	**68.41**	-	-	-	-	208.37
12	Tatyana Lysenko	Russia	**67.35**	-	**68.72**	**65.40**	61.09	-	-	-	201.47

== See also ==
- 2014 IAAF Diamond League
