= 2013 IAAF Hammer Throw Challenge =

- Edition: 4th
- Dates: 5 May–8 September
- Meetings: 15

The 2013 IAAF Hammer Throw Challenge was the fourth edition of the annual, global series of hammer throw competitions organised by the International Association of Athletics Federations. The winners were Paweł Fajdek (244.23 metres) and Anita Włodarczyk (233.83 metres), both of Poland. Both the final scores were records for the challenge.

A total of fifteen meetings featured on the circuit, with nine women's and nine men's contests spread across those events. The point scoring format was cumulative – the final standings were decided by the sum of athletes' three best throws on the circuit. Only the best throw by an athlete from each meet was taken into consideration.

== Calendar ==
The 2013 edition marked a move away from the series' alignment with the IAAF World Challenge circuit. Instead, the series was expanded and featured nine World Challenge meetings, one IAAF Diamond League meeting (Prefontaine Classic), and four non-IAAF meetings in Europe. Performances at the 2013 World Championships in Athletics were also included in series for the first time. The Rieti Meeting leg spanned two days, with a qualification round and a final the following day.

New additions to the tour included the Ponce Grand Prix de Atletismo, IAAF World Challenge Beijing, Moscow Challenge, Janusz Kusociński Memorial, István Gyulai Memorial, Karlstad Grand Prix and the Athletics Bridge. The Colorful Daegu Pre-Championships meet, Hanžeković Memorial and Meeting de Atletismo Madrid were dropped.

Meeting	City	Country	Date	Type
Golden Grand Prix	Tokyo	Japan	5 May	Men
Grande Premio Brasil Caixa de Atletismo	Rio de Janeiro	Brazil	12 May	Men
Ponce Grand Prix de Atletismo	Ponce	Puerto Rico	18 May	Men
IAAF World Challenge Beijing	Beijing	China	21 May	Women
Prefontaine Classic	Eugene	United States	31 May	Women
Moscow Challenge	Moscow	Russia	10 June	Women
Meeting Grand Prix IAAF de Dakar	Dakar	Senegal	12 June	Women
Janusz Kusociński Memorial	Szczecin	Poland	15 June	Both
Golden Spike Ostrava	Ostrava	Czech Republic	26 June	Both
István Gyulai Memorial	Budapest	Hungary	10 July	Men
Karlstad Grand Prix	Karlstad	Sweden	23 July	Men
World Championships	Moscow	Russia	10, 12, 14 & 16 August	Men & Women
Internationales Stadionfest	Berlin	Germany	1 September	Women
Rieti Meeting	Rieti	Italy	7–8 September	Both

== Final standings ==
=== Men ===
A total of twelve men recorded valid marks at three meetings and made the final standings.

Rank	Athlete	Nation	Tokyo	Rio	Ponce	Szczecin	Ostrava	Budapest	Karlstad	WC	Rieti	Final score
1	Paweł Fajdek	Poland										244.23
2	Krisztián Pars	Hungary										244.17
3	Lukáš Melich	Czech Republic										239.80
4	Dilshod Nazarov	Tajikistan										236.22
5	Primož Kozmus	Slovenia										234.89
6	Marcel Lomnický	Slovakia										233.63
7	Szymon Ziółkowski	Poland										233.07
8	Aleksiy Sokirskiy	Ukraine										229.71
9	Markus Esser	Germany										229.28
10	Sergey Litvinov	Russia										228.70
11	Nicola Vizzoni	Italy										226.30
12	Hassan Mohamed Mahmoud	Egypt										213.84

=== Women ===
A total of eleven women recorded valid marks at three meetings and made the final standings.

Rank	Athlete	Nation	Beijing	Eugene	Moscow	Dakar	Szczecin	Ostrava	WC	Berlin	Rieti	Final score
1	Anita Włodarczyk	Poland										233.83
2	Tatyana Lysenko	Russia										227.59
3	Betty Heidler	Germany										226.93
4	Yipsi Moreno	Cuba										220.74
5	Jeneva Stevens	United States										218.76
6	Éva Orbán	Hungary										218.24
7	Kathrin Klaas	Germany										214.10
8	Martina Hrašnová	Slovakia										212.57
9	Zalina Marghieva	Moldova										212.51
10	Gulfiya Khanafeyeva	Russia										208.06
11	Amanda Bingson	United States										206.94
