= 2016 IAAF Hammer Throw Challenge =

- Edition: 7th
- Dates: 5 March–11 September
- Meetings: 11

The 2016 IAAF Hammer Throw Challenge is the seventh edition of the annual, global series of hammer throw competitions organised by the International Association of Athletics Federations.

A total of thirteen meetings will feature on the circuit, with nine women's and ten men's contests spread across those events. The point scoring format is cumulative – the final standings were decided by the sum of athletes' three best throws on the circuit. Only the best throw by an athlete from each meet was taken into consideration.

== Calendar ==
The 2016 series calendar mainly comprised IAAF World Challenge meetings, supplemented by the Prefontaine Classic (a Diamond League meet) and three non-IAAF meetings: the Grande Premio Brasil Caixa de Atletismo, István Gyulai Memorial and Paavo Nurmi Games. Performances from the Olympic Games are also valid for the series. The Golden Grand Prix, Meeting International Mohammed VI d'Athlétisme de Rabat, Brothers Znamensky Memorial and Karlstad Grand Prix were also dropped from the programme. The Jamaica International Invitational made its debut on the series. The FBK Games, Hanžeković Memorial and Rieti Meeting were initially to be included, but were later dropped.

Meeting	City	Country	Date	Type
IAAF Melbourne World Challenge	Melbourne	Australia	5 March	Men
Jamaica International Invitational	Kingston	Jamaica	7 May	Women
IAAF World Challenge Beijing	Beijing	China	18 May	Women
Golden Spike Ostrava	Ostrava	Czech Republic	19 May	Both
IAAF World Challenge Dakar	Dakar	Senegal	25 May	Both
Prefontaine Classic	Eugene	United States	28 May	Men
Janusz Kusociński Memorial	Szczecin	Poland	18 June	Both
Grande Premio Brasil Caixa de Atletismo	São Bernardo do Campo	Brazil	26 June	Women
Paavo Nurmi Games	Turku	Finland	29 June	Men
István Gyulai Memorial	Székesfehérvár	Hungary	19 July	Both
Olympic Games	Rio de Janeiro	Brazil	5–21 August	Men & Women

== Results ==
=== Men ===
Meet	First		Second		Third	
Melbourne	Matthew Denny (AUS)	68.63 m	Huw Peacock (AUS)	65.51 m	Matthew Bloxham (NZL)	61.30 m
Ostrava	Paweł Fajdek (POL)	80.66 m	Dilshod Nazarov (TJK)	78.82 m	Marcel Lomnický (SVK)	77.48 m

=== Women ===
Meet	First		Second		Third	
Kingston	Gwen Berry (USA)	73.82 m	Jeneva Stevens (USA)	71.06 m	Sophie Hitchon (GBR)	70.65 m
Beijing	Zhang Wenxiu (CHN)	75.58 m	Zalina Marghieva (MDA)	72.39 m	Amber Campbell (USA)	72.12 m
Ostrava	Anita Włodarczyk (POL)	78.54 m	Wang Zheng (CHN)	73.80 m	Joanna Fiodorow (POL)	72.77 m
