= 2012 IAAF Hammer Throw Challenge =

- Edition: 3rd
- Dates: 6 May–9 September
- Meetings: 8

The 2012 IAAF Hammer Throw Challenge was the third edition of the annual, global series of hammer throw competitions organised by the International Association of Athletics Federations. The winners were Krisztián Pars of Hungary (242.35 metres) and Betty Heidler of Germany (230.49 metres). Both retained their titles from 2011 and for Heidler this was a third straight victory. Both the final scores were records for the challenge.

A total of eight meetings featured on the circuit, with five women's and six men's contests spread across those events. The point scoring format was cumulative – the final standings were decided by the sum of athletes' three best throws on the circuit. Only the best throw by an athlete from each meet was taken into consideration.

== Calendar ==
Roughly contiguous with the IAAF World Challenge circuit, a permit hammer throw event was held at eight of the fourteen meetings of that circuit. Compared to the previous year, one less meeting featured on the series. The Meeting Grand Prix IAAF de Dakar and Brothers Znamensky Memorial were dropped and the Internationales Stadionfest in Berlin was included.

Meeting	City	Country	Date	Type
Golden Grand Prix	Kawasaki	Japan	6 May	Men
Colorful Daegu Pre-Championships	Daegu	South Korea	16 May	Women
Grande Premio Brasil Caixa de Atletismo	Rio de Janeiro	Brazil	20 May	Both
Golden Spike Ostrava	Ostrava	Czech Republic	25 May	Both
Meeting de Atletismo Madrid	Madrid	Spain	7 July	Men
Internationales Stadionfest	Berlin	Germany	2 September	Women
Hanžeković Memorial	Zagreb	Croatia	4 September	Men
Rieti Meeting	Rieti	Italy	9 September	Both

== Final standings ==
=== Men ===
A total of seven men recorded valid marks at three meetings and made the final standings.

Rank	Athlete	Nation	Kawasaki	Rio de Janeiro	Ostrava	Madrid	Zagreb	Rieti	Final score
1	Krisztián Pars	Hungary							242.35
2	Paweł Fajdek	Poland							236.47
3	Aleksiy Sokirskiy	Ukraine							233.39
4	Lukáš Melich	Czech Republic							227.44
5	Dilshod Nazarov	Tajikistan							224.97
6	Mattias Jons	Sweden							223.92
7	Szymon Ziółkowski	Poland							223.44

=== Women ===
A total of seven women recorded valid marks at three meetings and made the final standings.

Rank	Athlete	Nation	Daegu	Rio de Janeiro	Ostrava	Berlin	Rieti	Final score
1	Betty Heidler	Germany						230.49
2	Anita Włodarczyk	Poland						223.13
3	Tatyana Lysenko	Russia						222.05
4	Kathrin Klaas	Germany						216.60
5	Zalina Marghieva	Moldova						216.43
6	Martina Hrašnová	Slovakia						212.30
7	Sultana Frizell	Canada						204.61
