= 2011 IAAF Hammer Throw Challenge =

- Edition: 2nd
- Dates: 8 May–13 September
- Meetings: 9

The 2011 IAAF Hammer Throw Challenge was the second edition of the annual, global series of hammer throw competitions organised by the International Association of Athletics Federations. The winners were Krisztián Pars of Hungary (239.03 metres) and Betty Heidler of Germany (228.09 metres). Heidler retained her title from 2010, making her the first athlete to win the series twice. Both the final scores were records for the challenge.

A total of nine meetings featured on the circuit, with six women's and seven men's contests spread across those events. The point scoring format was cumulative – the final standings were decided by the sum of athletes' three best throws on the circuit. Only the best throw by an athlete from each meet was taken into consideration.

== Calendar ==
Roughly contiguous with the IAAF World Challenge circuit, a permit hammer throw event was held at nine of the fourteen meetings of that circuit.

Meeting	City	Country	Date	Type
Golden Grand Prix	Kawasaki	Japan	8 May	Men
Colorful Daegu Pre-Championships	Daegu	South Korea	12 May	Women
Grande Premio Brasil Caixa de Atletismo	Rio de Janeiro	Brazil	26 May	Both
Meeting Grand Prix IAAF de Dakar	Dakar	Senegal	28 May	Women
Golden Spike Ostrava	Ostrava	Czech Republic	31 May	Both
Brothers Znamensky Memorial	Zhukovsky	Russia	3 July	Both
Meeting de Atletismo Madrid	Madrid	Spain	9 July	Men
Rieti Meeting	Rieti	Italy	10 September	Both
Hanžeković Memorial	Zagreb	Croatia	13 September	Men

== Final standings ==
=== Men ===
A total of twelve men recorded valid marks at three meetings and made the final standings.

Rank	Athlete	Nation	Kawasaki	Rio de Janeiro	Ostrava	Zhukovsky	Madrid	Rieti	Zagreb	Final score
1	Krisztián Pars	Hungary								239.03
2	Dilshod Nazarov	Tajikistan								235.72
3	Primož Kozmus	Slovenia								233.90
4	Sergey Litvinov	Russia								232.56
5	Nicola Vizzoni	Italy								232.44
6	Markus Esser	Germany								231.92
7	Aleksey Zagornyi	Russia								229.59
8	Kibwe Johnson	United States								229.44
9	Paweł Fajdek	Poland								226.98
10	Igors Sokolovs	Latvia								223.96
11	Anatoly Pozdnyakov	Russia								221.08
12	Szymon Ziółkowski	Poland								221.00

=== Women ===
A total of nine women recorded valid marks at three meetings and made the final standings.

Rank	Athlete	Nation	Kawasaki	Daegu	Rio de Janeiro	Ostrava	Zhukovsky	Rieti	Final score
1	Betty Heidler	Germany							228.09
2	Yipsi Moreno	Cuba							220.46
3	Kathrin Klaas	Germany							219.77
4	Tatyana Beloborodova	Russia							218.51
5	Zalina Marghieva	Moldova							214.58
6	Marina Marghieva-Nikisenko	Moldova							204.75
7	Martina Hrasnová	Slovakia							203.53
8	Amber Campbell	United States							201.75
9	Gulfiya Agafonova	Russia							191.54
