= 2010 IAAF Hammer Throw Challenge =

- Edition: 1st
- Dates: 24 April–1 September
- Meetings: 11

The 2010 IAAF Hammer Throw Challenge was the inaugural edition of the IAAF Hammer Throw Challenge, an international series of hammer throw competitions around the world.

Koji Murofushi of Japan won the men's challenge, while Betty Heidler of Germany prevailed on women's side.

== Origin ==
2010 marked the first edition of the IAAF Diamond League, which replaced the IAAF Golden League as the highest level of international track and field meetings. The Diamond League sought to showcase all the events, but according to IAAF, hammer throw could not be included for infrastructure reasons. Therefore, a separate Hammer Throw Challenge was created.

== Awards ==
On February 19, IAAF announced a US$202,000 prize fund for the Challenge, to be split equally between men and women. The overall winners would pocket $30,000 each. In addition, each of the fourteen competitions would award $7,500 in prize money, with $2,000 going to the winner.

== Format and calendar ==
The 2010 IAAF Hammer Throw Challenge consisted of a total of 14 competitions (seven for men and seven for women), in a total of 11 meets (three meets would feature both men and women). Points were scored simply by adding together an athlete's three best results from the Challenge (no more than one per meet). An athlete could compete in as many meets as they liked, but only the three best results would count. Any athlete achieving a new (and ratified) world record would receive a 1-meter bonus.

| Meeting | City | Country | Date | Type |
|---|---|---|---|---|
| Meeting Grand Prix IAAF de Dakar | Dakar | Senegal | April 24 | Women |
| Osaka Grand Prix | Osaka | Japan | May 8 | Men |
| Colorful Daegu Pre-Championships | Daegu | South Korea | May 19 | Women |
| Grande Premio Brasil Caixa de Atletismo | Rio de Janeiro | Brazil | May 23 | Both |
| Golden Spike Ostrava | Ostrava | Czech Republic | May 26 | Both |
| Fanny Blankers-Koen Games | Hengelo | Netherlands | May 30 | Men |
| Brothers Znamensky Memorial | Zhukovsky | Russia | June 26 | Women |
| Meeting de Atletismo Madrid | Madrid | Spain | July 2 | Men |
| ISTAF Berlin | Berlin | Germany | August 22 | Women |
| Rieti Meeting | Rieti | Italy | August 28-29 | Both |
| Hanžeković Memorial | Zagreb | Croatia | September 1 | Men |

== Results ==
=== Men ===
(Japan) Osaka, May 8
| Pos | Athlete | Country | Result |
| 1 | Dilshod Nazarov | (Tajikistan) | 78.84 |
| 2 | Yury Shayunou | (Belarus) | 77.95 |
| 3 | Koji Murofushi | (Japan) | 77.86 |
| 4 | Nicola Vizzoni | (Italy) | 75.80 |
| 5 | Artem Rubanko | (Ukraine) | 75.64 |
| 6 | Aleksey Zagorniy | (Russia) | 75.15 |
| 7 | Igors Sokolovs | (Latvia) | 74.99 |
| 8 | Ali Mohamed Al-Zinkawi | (Kuwait) | 74.80 |
| 9 | Marco Lingua | (Italy) | 72.67 |

(Brazil) Rio de Janeiro, May 23
| Pos | Athlete | Country | Result |
| 1 | Dilshod Nazarov | (Tajikistan) | 77.38 |
| 2 | Igors Sokolovs | (Latvia) | 77.09 |
| 3 | Artem Rubanko | (Ukraine) | 76.54 |
| 4 | Jérôme Bortoluzzi | (France) | 72.48 |
| 5 | Wagner Domingos | (Brazil) | 70.92 |
| 6 | Juan Ignacio Cerra | (Argentina) | 69.77 |
| 7 | Marcos dos Santos | (Brazil) | 63.91 |
| 8 | Allan Wolski | (Brazil) | 61.92 |

(Czech Republic) Ostrava, May 26
| Pos | Athlete | Country | Result |
| 1 | Krisztián Pars | (Hungary) | 79.15 |
| 2 | Dilshod Nazarov | (Tajikistan) | 78.69 |
| 3 | Sergej Litvinov | (Germany) | 77.64 |
| 4 | Markus Esser | (Germany) | 76.45 |
| 5 | Olli-Pekka Karjalainen | (Finland) | 75.87 |
| 6 | Ali Mohamed Al-Zinkawi | (Kuwait) | 75.00 |
| 7 | Aleksey Zagorniy | (Russia) | 74.99 |
| 8 | Szymon Ziólkowski | (Poland) | 72.50 |
| 9 | Marco Lingua | (Italy) | 70.34 |
| | Libor Charfreitag | (Slovakia) | NM |

(Netherlands) Hengelo, May 30
| Pos | Athlete | Country | Result |
| 1 | Sergej Litvinov | (Germany) | 78.98 |
| 2 | Dilshod Nazarov | (Tajikistan) | 78.29 |
| 3 | Krisztián Pars | (Hungary) | 77.14 |
| 4 | Olli-Pekka Karjalainen | (Finland) | 76.94 |
| 5 | Libor Charfreitag | (Slovakia) | 75.91 |
| 6 | Ali Mohamed Al-Zinkawi | (Kuwait) | 75.65 |
| 7 | Yury Shayunou | (Belarus) | 74.49 |
| 8 | Igors Sokolovs | (Latvia) | 74.12 |
| 9 | Markus Esser | (Germany) | 72.58 |
| 10 | Szymon Ziólkowski | (Poland) | 71.08 |
| 11 | Marco Lingua | (Italy) | 68.19 |

(Spain) Madrid, July 2
| Pos | Athlete | Country | Result |
| 1 | Dilshod Nazarov | (Tajikistan) | 78.49 |
| 2 | Libor Charfreitag | (Slovakia) | 78.40 |
| 3 | Krisztián Pars | (Hungary) | 78.23 |
| 4 | Sergej Litvinov | (Germany) | 77.00 |
| 5 | Igors Sokolovs | (Latvia) | 76.39 |
| 6 | Szymon Ziólkowski | (Poland) | 75.80 |
| 7 | Nicolas Figère | (France) | 75.10 |
| 8 | Nicola Vizzoni | (Italy) | 74.76 |
| 9 | Wojciech Kondratowicz | (Poland) | 74.63 |
| 10 | Javier Cienfuegos | (Spain) | 68.04 |
| 11 | Isaac Vicente | (Spain) | 66.99 |

(Italy) Rieti, August 28-29
| Pos | Athlete | Country | Result |
| 1 | Koji Murofushi | (Japan) | 80.96 |
| 2 | Libor Charfreitag | (Slovakia) | 79.62 |
| 3 | Dilshod Nazarov | (Tajikistan) | 78.34 |
| 4 | Sergej Litvinov | (Germany) | 76.77 |
| 5 | Pavel Kryvitski | (Belarus) | 76.45 |
| 6 | Nicola Vizzoni | (Italy) | 76.39 |
| 7 | Krisztián Pars | (Hungary) | 75.81 |
| 8 | Szymon Ziólkowski | (Poland) | 75.73 |
| 9 | Olli-Pekka Karjalainen | (Finland) | 73.82 |
| 10 | Yury Shayunou | (Belarus) | 72.92 |
| 11 | Valeri Sviatokha | (Belarus) | 72.31 |
| 12 | Marco Lingua | (Italy) | 70.03 |

(Croatia) Zagreb, September 1
| Pos | Athlete | Country | Result |
| 1 | Koji Murofushi | (Japan) | 79.71 |
| 2 | Libor Charfreitag | (Slovakia) | 77.24 |
| 3 | Krisztián Pars | (Hungary) | 76.96 |
| 4 | Markus Esser | (Germany) | 76.19 |
| 5 | Dilshod Nazarov | (Tajikistan) | 75.95 |
| 6 | Yury Shayunou | (Belarus) | 75.35 |
| 7 | Szymon Ziólkowski | (Poland) | 74.48 |
| 8 | Ali Mohamed Al-Zinkawi | (Kuwait) | 73.42 |
| 9 | Olli-Pekka Karjalainen | (Finland) | 71.89 |
| 10 | Andras Haklits | (Croatia) | 71.83 |
| | Sergej Litvinov | (Germany) | NM |

35-year-old Koji Murofushi of Japan, Olympic gold medalist from 2004, managed to beat Tajikistan's Dilshod Nazarov by two and a half meters despite only competing three times. Libor Charfreitag, who won the European championship in 2010, placed third.

Final Standings
| Pos | Athlete | Country | (Japan) | (Brazil) | (Czech Republic) | (Netherlands) | (Spain) | (Italy) | (Croatia) | Total |
| 1 | Koji Murofushi | (Japan) | 77.86 | | | | | 80.96 | 79.71 | 238.52 |
| 2 | Dilshod Nazarov | (Tajikistan) | 78.94 | 77.38 | 78.69 | 78.29 | 78.49 | 78.34 | 75.95 | 236.02 |
| 3 | Libor Charfreitag | (Slovakia) | | | NM | 75.91 | 78.40 | 79.62 | 77.24 | 235.26 |
| 4 | Krisztián Pars | (Hungary) | | | 79.15 | 77.14 | 78.23 | 75.81 | 76.96 | 234.52 |
| 5 | Sergej Litvinov | (Germany) | | | 77.64 | 78.98 | 77.00 | 76.77 | NM | 233.62 |
| 6 | Igors Sokolovs | (Latvia) | 74.99 | 77.09 | | 74.12 | 76.39 | | | 228.47 |
| 7 | Yury Shayunou | (Belarus) | 77.95 | | | 74.49 | | 72.92 | 75.35 | 227.79 |
| 8 | Nicola Vizzoni | (Italy) | 75.80 | | | | 74.76 | 76.39 | | 226.95 |
| 9 | Olli-Pekka Karjalainen | (Finland) | | | 75.87 | 76.94 | | 73.82 | 71.89 | 226.63 |
| 10 | Szymon Ziólkowski | (Poland) | | | 72.50 | 71.08 | 75.80 | 75.73 | 74.48 | 226.01 |
| 11 | Ali Mohamed Al-Zinkawi | (Kuwait) | 74.80 | | 75.00 | 75.65 | | | 73.42 | 225.45 |
| 12 | Markus Esser | (Germany) | | | 76.45 | 72.58 | | | 76.19 | 225.21 |
| 13 | Marco Lingua | (Italy) | 72.67 | | 70.34 | 68.19 | | 70.03 | | 213.04 |

=== Women ===
(Senegal) Dakar, April 24
| Pos | Athlete | Country | Result |
| 1 | Anita Włodarczyk | (Poland) | 75.13 |
| 2 | Marina Marghieva | (Moldova) | 72.14 |
| 3 | Tatyana Lysenko | (Russia) | 70.02 |
| 4 | Clarissa Claretti | (Italy) | 69.20 |
| 5 | Silvia Salis | (Italy) | 68.36 |
| 6 | Jennifer Dahlgren | (Argentina) | 67.94 |
| 7 | Amber Campbell | (United States) | 67.83 |
| 8 | Nataliya Zolotukhina | (Ukraine) | 66.95 |
| 9 | Maryia Smaliachkova | (Belarus) | 64.18 |
| 10 | Volha Tsander | (Belarus) | 61.72 |
| 11 | Amy Sène | (France) | 58.51 |

(South Korea) Daegu, May 19
| Pos | Athlete | Country | Result |
| 1 | Betty Heidler | (Germany) | 75.28 |
| 2 | Tatyana Lysenko | (Russia) | 72.36 |
| 3 | Kathrin Klaas | (Germany) | 72.12 |
| 4 | Anita Włodarczyk | (Poland) | 71.86 |
| 5 | Sultana Frizell | (Canada) | 71.23 |
| 6 | Zalina Marghieva | (Moldova) | 70.75 |
| 7 | Amber Campbell | (United States) | 69.01 |
| 8 | Iryna Sekachova | (Ukraine) | 68.21 |
| 9 | Andrea Bunjes | (Germany) | 60.31 |
| 10 | Na-ru Kang | (South Korea) | 55.58 |

(Brazil) Rio de Janeiro, May 23
| Pos | Athlete | Country | Result |
| 1 | Darya Pchelnik | (Belarus) | 73.01 |
| 2 | Stéphanie Falzon | (France) | 69.65 |
| 3 | Jessica Cosby | (United States) | 68.63 |
| 4 | Marina Marghieva | (Moldova) | 67.85 |
| 5 | Rosa Rodríguez | (Venezuela) | 65.00 |
| 6 | Barbara Špiler | (Slovenia) | 64.92 |
| 7 | Jennifer Dahlgren | (Argentina) | 64.52 |
| 8 | Johana Moreno | (Venezuela) | 64.15 |
| 9 | Josiane Soares | (Brazil) | 62.78 |
| 10 | Anna Paula Pereira | (Brazil) | 54.77 |

(Czech Republic) Ostrava, May 26
| Pos | Athlete | Country | Result |
| 1 | Anita Włodarczyk | (Poland) | 75.74 |
| 2 | Betty Heidler | (Germany) | 75.25 |
| 3 | Darya Pchelnik | (Belarus) | 73.00 |
| 4 | Kathrin Klaas | (Germany) | 72.32 |
| 5 | Jennifer Dahlgren | (Argentina) | 72.18 |
| 6 | Tatyana Lysenko | (Russia) | 71.00 |
| 7 | Zalina Marghieva | (Moldova) | 70.21 |
| 8 | Clarissa Claretti | (Italy) | 69.16 |
| 9 | Stéphanie Falzon | (France) | 68.71 |
| 10 | Marina Marghieva | (Moldova) | 67.83 |
| 11 | Katerina Šafránková | (Czech Republic) | 63.52 |
| 12 | Romana Grómanová | (Czech Republic) | 59.41 |

(Russia) Zhukovsky, June 26
| Pos | Athlete | Country | Result |
| 1 | Tatyana Lysenko | (Russia) | 76.03 |
| 2 | Yipsi Moreno | (Cuba) | 75.19 |
| 3 | Stéphanie Falzon | (France) | 72.37 |
| 4 | Darya Pchelnik | (Belarus) | 72.17 |
| 5 | Sultana Frizell | (Canada) | 71.32 |
| 6 | Oksana Kondrateva | (Russia) | 68.84 |
| 7 | Iryna Sekachova | (Ukraine) | 66.24 |
| 8 | Marina Marghieva | (Moldova) | 65.03 |
| 9 | Anna Bulgakova | (Russia) | 61.84 |

(Germany) Berlin, August 22
| Pos | Athlete | Country | Result |
| 1 | Betty Heidler | (Germany) | 75.35 |
| 2 | Anita Włodarczyk | (Poland) | 74.43 |
| 3 | Tatyana Lysenko | (Russia) | 73.14 |
| 4 | Kathrin Klaas | (Germany) | 71.66 |
| 5 | Yipsi Moreno | (Cuba) | 70.22 |
| 6 | Bianca Perie | (Romania) | 70.02 |
| 7 | Amber Campbell | (United States) | 69.47 |
| 8 | Jennifer Dahlgren | (Argentina) | 68.14 |
| 9 | Stéphanie Falzon | (France) | 65.03 |
| 10 | Darya Pchelnik | (Belarus) | 63.08 |

(Italy) Rieti, August 28-29
| Pos | Athlete | Country | Result |
| 1 | Tatyana Lysenko | (Russia) | 74.80 |
| 2 | Yipsi Moreno | (Cuba) | 73.78 |
| 3 | Zhang Wenxiu | (China) | 73.70 |
| 4 | Anita Włodarczyk | (Poland) | 73.57 |
| 5 | Jennifer Dahlgren | (Argentina) | 70.43 |
| 6 | Amber Campbell | (United States) | 69.87 |
| 7 | Zalina Marghieva | (Moldova) | 69.15 |
| 8 | Nataliya Zolotukhina | (Ukraine) | 68.92 |
| 9 | Stéphanie Falzon | (France) | 66.44 |
| | Darya Pchelnik | (Belarus) | NM |

2007 World champion Betty Heidler edged out reigning champion and world record holder Anita Włodarczyk in a close race. 2006 European champion Tatyana Lysenko placed third.

Final Standings
| Pos | Athlete | Country | (Senegal) | (South Korea) | (Brazil) | (Czech Republic) | (Russia) | (Germany) | (Italy) | Total |
| 1 | Betty Heidler | (Germany) | | 75.28 | | 75.25 | | 75.35 | | 225.88 |
| 2 | Anita Włodarczyk | (Poland) | 75.13 | 71.86 | | 75.74 | | 74.43 | 73.57 | 225.30 |
| 3 | Tatyana Lysenko | (Russia) | 70.03 | 72.36 | | 71.00 | 76.03 | 73.14 | 74.80 | 223.96 |
| 4 | Yipsi Moreno | (Cuba) | | | | | 75.19 | 70.22 | 73.78 | 219.19 |
| 5 | Darya Pchelnik | (Belarus) | | | 73.01 | 73.00 | 72.17 | 63.08 | NM | 218.18 |
| 6 | Kathrin Klaas | (Germany) | | 72.12 | | 72.32 | | 71.66 | | 216.10 |
| 7 | Jennifer Dahlgren | (Argentina) | 67.94 | | 64.52 | 72.18 | | 68.14 | 70.43 | 210.75 |
| 8 | Stéphanie Falzon | (France) | | | 69.65 | 68.71 | 72.37 | 65.03 | 66.44 | 210.73 |
| 9 | Zalina Marghieva | (Moldova) | | 70.75 | | 70.21 | | | 69.15 | 210.11 |
| 10 | Amber Campbell | (United States) | 67.83 | 69.01 | | | | 69.47 | 69.87 | 208.35 |
| 11 | Marina Marghieva | (Moldova) | 72.14 | | 67.85 | 67.83 | 65.03 | | | 207.82 |
