= Hungary at the 2013 World Championships in Athletics =

- WA code: HUN
- National federation: Magyar Atlétikai Szövetség
- Website: www.masz.hu

in Moscow
- Competitors: 11
- Medals Ranked 26th: Gold 0 Silver 1 Bronze 0 Total 1

World Championships in Athletics appearances
- 1976; 1980; 1983; 1987; 1991; 1993; 1995; 1997; 1999; 2001; 2003; 2005; 2007; 2009; 2011; 2013; 2015; 2017; 2019; 2022; 2023; 2025

Hungary competed at the 2013 World Championships in Athletics from August 10 to August 18 in Moscow, Russia.

== Medallists ==
Medal	Name	Event	Date
Silver	Krisztián Pars	Hammer throw	12 August

== Results ==
=== Men ===
Track and road events

Athlete	Event	Heat		Semifinal		Final	
Athlete	Event	Result	Rank	Result	Rank	Result	Rank
Balázs Baji	110 metres hurdles	13.36	7 Q	13.49	12	did not advance	
Tamás Kazi	800 metres	1:46.48	12 q	1:46.40	16	did not advance	
Máté Helebrandt	20 km walk	—N/a				1:28.49	41
Sándor Rácz	50 km walk	—N/a				4:12:18	45

Field events

Athlete	Event	Qualification		Final	
Athlete	Event	Distance	Position	Distance	Position
Ákos Hudi	Hammer throw	74.30	15	did not advance	
Krisztián Pars	Hammer throw	79.06	1 Q	80.30	Silver medal

=== Women ===
Track and road events

Athlete	Event	Final	
Athlete	Event	Result	Rank
Viktória Madarász	20 km walk	1:34:10	37

Field events

Athlete	Event	Qualification		Final	
Athlete	Event	Distance	Position	Distance	Position
Anita Márton	Shot put	17.32	20	did not advance	
Éva Orbán	Hammer throw	70.62	11 q	72.70	8
Barbara Szabó	High jump	1.83	=20	did not advance	

Combined events – Heptathlon

Athlete	Event	100H	HJ	SP	200 m	LJ	JT	800 m	Final	Rank
Györgyi Zsivoczky-Farkas	Result	14.09	1.80	13.13	25.66	6.16	45.43	2:15.28	6067	15
Györgyi Zsivoczky-Farkas	Points	966	978	736	827	899	772	889	6067	15
