= 2013 World Championships in Athletics – Men's hammer throw =

Men's hammer throw at the 2013 World Championships
- Venue: Luzhniki Stadium
- Dates: 10 August (qualification); 12 August (final)
- Competitors: 28 from 22 nations
- Winning distance: 81.97 m (268 ft 11 in)

Medalists
gold medal	Paweł Fajdek; Poland
silver medal	Krisztián Pars; Hungary
bronze medal	Lukáš Melich; Czech Republic

The men's hammer throw at the 2013 World Championships in Athletics was held at the Luzhniki Stadium on 10–12 August.

Performances in the World Championships contributed to the final scoring of the 2013 IAAF Hammer Throw Challenge – a first for the series. Paweł Fajdek was victorious in both the World Championships and the seasonal challenge

== Records ==
Prior to the competition, the records were as follows:

World record	Yuriy Sedykh (URS)	86.74	Stuttgart, West Germany	30 August 1986
Championship record	Ivan Tsikhan (BLR)	83.89	Helsinki, Finland	8 August 2005
World leading	Krisztián Pars (HUN)	81.02	Szczecin, Poland	15 June 2013
African record	Chris Harmse (RSA)	80.63	Durban, South Africa	15 April 2005
Asian record	Koji Murofushi (JPN)	84.86	Prague, Czech Republic	29 June 2003
North, Central American and Caribbean record	Lance Deal (USA)	82.52	Milan, Italy	7 September 1996
South American record	Juan Ignacio Cerra (ARG)	76.42	Trieste, Italy	25 July 2001
European record	Yuriy Sedykh (URS)	86.74	Stuttgart, West Germany	30 August 1986
Oceanian record	Stuart Rendell (AUS)	79.29	Varaždin, Croatia	6 July 2002

== Qualification standards ==
A result	B result
79.00	76.00

== Schedule ==
Date	Time	Round
10 August 2013	17:05	Qualification
12 August 2013	20:30	Final

All times are local times (UTC+4)

== Results ==
KEY:	Q	Qualified	q	12 best performers	NR	National record	PB	Personal best	SB	Seasonal best

=== Qualification ===
Qualification: 77.00 m (Q) and at least 12 best (q) advanced to the final.

Rank	Group	Name	Nationality	No. 1	No. 2	No. 3	Mark	Notes
1	A	Krisztián Pars	Hungary	75.21	79.06		79.06	Q
2	A	Lukáš Melich	Czech Republic	78.52			78.52	Q
3	B	Primož Kozmus	Slovenia	78.10			78.10	Q
DQ	B	Dilshod Nazarov	Tajikistan	~~71.70~~	~~77.93~~		~~77.93~~	Doping
4	B	Sergej Litvinov	Russia	75.08	74.20	77.41	77.41	q
5	A	Marcel Lomnický	Slovakia	74.11	76.97	76.60	76.97	q
6	B	Szymon Ziółkowski	Poland	76.19	76.85	75.15	76.85	q
7	A	Koji Murofushi	Japan	74.10	x	76.27	76.27	q
8	A	Paweł Fajdek	Poland	x	76.17	75.18	76.17	q
9	B	Markus Esser	Germany	70.44	72.54	75.90	75.90	q
10	B	Nicola Vizzoni	Italy	74.65	74.02	75.38	75.38	q
11	B	Yury Shayunou	Belarus	x	74.15	75.18	75.18	q
12	B	Quentin Bigot	France	73.69	70.46	74.98	74.98	
DQ	B	Pavel Kryvitski	Belarus	~~74.45~~	~~x~~	~~x~~	~~74.45~~	Doping
13	B	Ákos Hudi	Hungary	70.56	74.30	73.72	74.30	
14	A	Mattias Jons	Sweden	73.47	x	x	73.47	
15	A	A. G. Kruger	United States	x	73.35	73.23	73.35	
16	A	Yevhen Vynohradov	Ukraine	71.05	x	72.90	72.90	
17	B	Igors Sokolovs	Latvia	72.78	x	x	72.78	
18	B	Dzmitry Marshin	Azerbaijan	72.43	x	x	72.43	
19	A	Valeriy Sviatokha	Belarus	x	70.35	72.05	72.05	
20	A	Hassan Mohamed Mahmoud	Egypt	70.11	71.88	x	71.88	
21	A	Roberto Janet	Cuba	71.73	x	69.07	71.73	
22	B	Chris Harmse	South Africa	71.42	x	x	71.42	
23	A	Javier Cienfuegos	Spain	70.79	70.05	x	70.79	
24	A	Mohamed Ashraf Amjad Al-Saifi	Qatar	69.70	x	x	69.70	
25	B	Aleksey Korolev	Russia	69.69	x	x	69.69	
	A	Aleksey Zagornyi	Russia	x	x	x	NM	
	A	Ali Al-Zinkawi	Kuwait				DNS	

=== Final ===
The final was started at 20:30.

Rank	Name	Nationality	No. 1	No. 2	No. 3	No. 4	No. 5	No. 6	Mark	Notes
1st place, gold medalist(s)	Paweł Fajdek	Poland	81.97	80.92	x	78.41	x	79.57	81.97	WL, PB
2nd place, silver medalist(s)	Krisztián Pars	Hungary	80.30	79.47	79.61	78.90	79.02	x	80.30	
3rd place, bronze medalist(s)	Lukáš Melich	Czech Republic	70.66	77.11	79.36	76.88	x	75.52	79.36	
4	Primož Kozmus	Slovenia	77.80	79.21	79.22	78.26	x	x	79.22	
DQ	Dilshod Nazarov	Tajikistan	~~72.45~~	~~x 75.89~~	~~77.69~~	~~78.31~~	~~77.27~~	~~77.84~~	~~78.31~~	Doping
5	Koji Murofushi	Japan	78.03	75.38	77.17	77.63	77.92	76.03	78.03	SB
6	Nicola Vizzoni	Italy	75.33	77.61	75.29	x	75.42	x	77.61	SB
7	Marcel Lomnický	Slovakia	76.62	x	77.57	x	76.46	76.48	77.57	
8	Szymon Ziółkowski	Poland	75.93	76.84	76.50				76.84	
9	Markus Esser	Germany	74.07	76.25	x				76.25	
10	Sergej Litvinov	Russia	75.90	x	x				75.90	
11	Yury Shayunou	Belarus	73.68	x	72.64				73.68	
