= Pál Németh =

Hungarian sportsperson

Pál Németh (20 June 1937 – 9 January 2009) was a Hungarian sportsperson and later coach in hammer throwing.

Born in Szentkirály, he was the son of athletics coach László Németh. During his own sporting career, Pál Németh played volleyball and basketball, both in the highest Hungarian league. He took up hammer throwing at the age of 23, and opened his own training centre in 1964.

He trained his own son Zsolt Németh, Tibor Gécsek, Krisztián Pars and Adrián Annus, among others. He was decorated several times, including the 1998 Coach of the Year award. He was also an exhibited painter.

He died on 9 January 2009 from heart failure. An annual hammer throwing meeting was established in his honour that same year – the Pál Németh Memorial. Held in Szombathely in September, Hungarian number one Krisztián Pars won the first two meetings, which also attracted Olympic gold medallists Primož Kozmus and Szymon Ziółkowski among others.
