= Mattias Jons =

Swedish hammer thrower (born 1982)

Mattias Jons (born 19 November 1982) is a Swedish hammer thrower and coach. He finished sixth at the 2012 European Championships, competed at two World Championships, became Swedish champion seven times in a row as well as Swedish indoor champion four times in a row.

== Early career ==
Jons grew up in Ängebo near Bjuråker. He represented the club Järvsö IF before changing to the national elite club Hässelby SK.

Jons competed at his first Finland–Sweden Athletics International in 2002 and won his first medals at the Swedish championships, bronze medals in 2002 and 2003. He upgraded to silver at the Swedish nationals in 2004, also breaking the 65 metre barrier with a throw of 67.47 metres in Gothenburg in July. During the early 2000s, Jons attended Boise State University and competed for the Boise State Broncos. He finished second at the 2005 NCAA Division I Championships and 2006 NCAA Division I Championships, before appearing in his first European Cup First League contest. At the 2006 NCAA championship, he also broke the 70 metre barrier with a throw of 71.31 metres, which he improved to 71.61 in Boise in April 2007.

Bronze in 2005 and silver in 2006 at the Swedish championships were followed by his first gold in 2007; in 2008 he secured back-to-back titles, this time with a personal best of 72.63. In 2008 he also competed at another European Cup First League event, and got his first podium at the Finland–Sweden International, with a third place. The Swedish title and the Finnkampen third place were repeated in 2009, along with a tenth place at the 2009 European Team Championships Super League. Another personal best was set in June 2009 in Nyköping, this time with 74.23 metres.

== International breakthrough ==
Mattias Jons started 2010 with his first Swedish indoor title, coming in the weight throw. He won four times in a row until 2013. He reached a length of 23.18 metres, which is the Swedish indoor record.

He competed at the 2010 European Winter Throwing Cup and the 2010 European Team Championships First League, and in June 2010 he set another personal best, this time 74.76 metres in Järvsjö. Entering the 2010 European Championships, he threw 74.56 metres in the qualifying round to reach the final. However, in the final he failed to register a valid throw.

He bounced back by becoming Swedish champion again in 2010 and 2011. He finished tenth at the 2011 European Team Championships Super League and competed at the 2011 World Championships without reaching the final, before achieving another podium at the Finland–Sweden International. He achieved a new personal best of 74.85 metres in June 2012 in Florø, then finished sixth at the 2012 European Championships. In July 2012, he continued with back-to-back personal bests, first 74.99 in Lillestrøm and 76.12 at the Meeting de Atletismo Madrid. He was therefore dejected and angry when he was not selected for the 2012 Summer Olympics. The Olympic Committee claimed that he was not a candidate for finishing in the top 8; however, Jons pointed to his personal bests, his sixth place at the Euros and fifth in Madrid. "I don't know how the fuck one can interpret this in any other way, than me reaching the top 8 in the first big meet before the Olympics".

He stabilized himself over 75 metres, recording 75.18 in Karlstad and 75.00 in Kuortane before the month of July was over. Jons wrapped up 2012 by becoming Swedish champion again, finishing second in the Finland–Sweden International and achieving his second best throw of 75.64 during a 2012 IAAF Hammer Throw Challenge meet in Zagreb.

Jons began his 2013 outdoor season at the 2013 European Winter Throwing Cup, doing four meets in the 72–73 metre range. At the 2013 European Team Championships First League, he got no valid mark and thus did not score any points for Sweden. He bounced back at a series of meets in Finland, throwing 76.31 metres in July in Mänttä, and was selected for the 2013 World Championships, though he again bowed out in the qualifying round. His penultimate competition was the Swedish championships, throwing 75.24 to take his seventh national title in a row, and his ultimate event was the 2013 Finland–Sweden International. Jons rejoiced as he achieved a lifetime best of 76.39 metres, which also secured Sweden's first victory over Finland in the men's hammer throw since 1997.

By 2014, he was injured and underwent knee surgery in April. He felt like he was in a "no man's land" regarding a continuation of his athletics career. His knee did not improve enough to continue as an elite athlete. Jons announced his retirement in December 2014. He was indicted into the Swedish version of the hall of fame, receiving a Stora grabbars märke in 2017.

== Coaching career ==
Jons took a coaching education, dividing his work between the sports school in Falun and the Swedish Olympic Committee. From May 2015 he coached Tracey Andersson. He later coached Ragnar Carlsson. Jons thus became accredited as a coach for the 2024 Summer Olympics, for the first time being included in a Swedish Olympic team.

At the 2023 gala of Swedish athletics, Mattias Jons received the Coach of the Year award. He also received a European Athletics honorary badge in 2023 (awarded in 2024).

== International championships ==
Representing Sweden
Year	Competition	Venue	Position	Event	Result
2010	European Championships	Barcelona, Spain	12th	Hammer throw	NM
2011	World Championships	Daegu, South Korea	32nd (q)	Hammer throw	67.93 m
2012	European Championships	Helsinki, Finland	6th	Hammer throw	74.44 m
2013	World Championships	Moscow, Russia	16th (q)	Hammer throw	73.47 m
