= Artem Rubanko =

Ukrainian hammer thrower

Personal information
- Born: March 21, 1974 (age 52) Kyiv, Ukrainian SSR, Soviet Union
- Height: 1.91 m (6 ft 3 in)
- Weight: 106 kg (234 lb)

Sport
- Country: Ukraine
- Sport: Athletics
- Event: Hammer throw
- Updated on 14 August 2012

Artem Borysovych Rubanko (Ukrainian: Артем Борисович Рубанко; born 21 August 1974 in Kyiv, in the Ukrainian SSR of the Soviet Union) is a Ukrainian hammer thrower. His personal best throw is 80.44 metres, achieved in May 2004 in Kyiv. He competed at the 2004, 2008 Olympic Games and 2012 Olympic Games without reaching the final.

== Achievements ==
Year	Competition	Venue	Position	Notes
Representing Ukraine
2004	Olympic Games	Athens, Greece	19th	75.08 m
2008	Olympic Games	Beijing, PR China	15th	74.47 m
2009	World Championships	Berlin, Germany	29th	69.81 m
