= Paavo Nurmi Stadium =

Sports venue in Turku, Finland

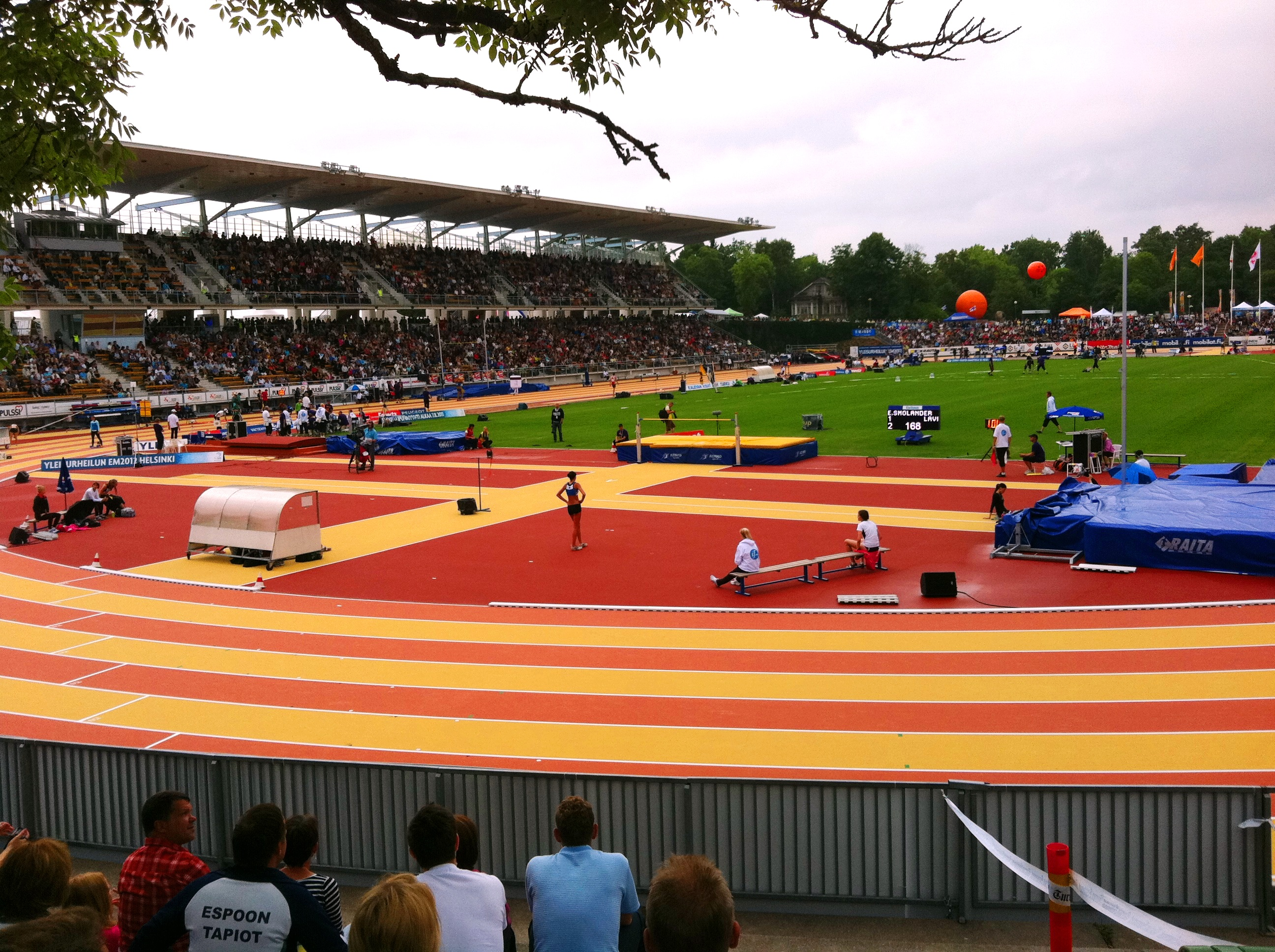
- 2011 Finnish Championships in Athletics at Paavo Nurmi Stadium
- Interactive map of Paavo Nurmi Stadium
- Location: Turku, Finland
- Coordinates: 60°26′33″N 022°15′39″E
- Owner: City of Turku
- Operator: City of Turku
- Capacity: 13,000

Construction
- Opened: 1890s
- Renovated: 1997

Website
- www.turku.fi/...

Paavo Nurmi Stadium (Finnish: Paavo Nurmen stadion, Swedish: Paavo Nurmis stadion) is a multi-use stadium in Turku, Finland. It is currently used mostly for football matches and athletics meets. It holds 13,000 people and is named after the Turku-born runner Paavo Nurmi. Twenty athletics world records have been set at the stadium. John Landy broke the world records for the 1,500 m and the mile (1954), Nurmi for the 3,000 m (1922), Emil Zátopek (1950) and Ron Clarke (1965) for the 10,000 m, Viljo Heino for the one-hour run (1945) and the 20 km (1949), Matti Järvinen for the javelin throw (1932) and Charles Hoff for the pole vault (1925).

Paavo Nurmi Games, a track and field meet, is held at the stadium annually.
