= Kuwait at the 2011 World Championships in Athletics =

- WA code: KUW
- National federation: Kuwait Association of Athletics Federation

in Daegu
- Competitors: 2
- Medals: Gold 0 Silver 0 Bronze 0 Total 0

World Championships in Athletics appearances
- 1983; 1987; 1991; 1993; 1995; 1997; 1999; 2001; 2003; 2005; 2007; 2009; 2011; 2013; 2015; 2017; 2019; 2022; 2023

Kuwait competed at the 2011 World Championships in Athletics from August 27 to September 4 in Daegu, South Korea. One athlete was announced to represent the country in the event. Another athlete, hammer thrower Ali Mohamed Al-Zinkawi appeared on the official start list.

== Results ==
=== Men ===
Athlete	Event	Preliminaries		Heats		Semifinals		Final	
Athlete	Event	Time Width Height	Rank	Time Width Height	Rank	Time Width Height	Rank	Time Width Height	Rank
Mohammad Al-Azemi	800 metres			1:46.64	14	DNF		Did not advance	
Ali Mohamed Al-Zinkawi	Hammer throw	75.35	13					Did not advance	
