= Ponce Grand Prix de Atletismo =

Track and field competition held yearly in Ponce, Puerto Rico

Coordinates: 18.002422°N 66.631785°W

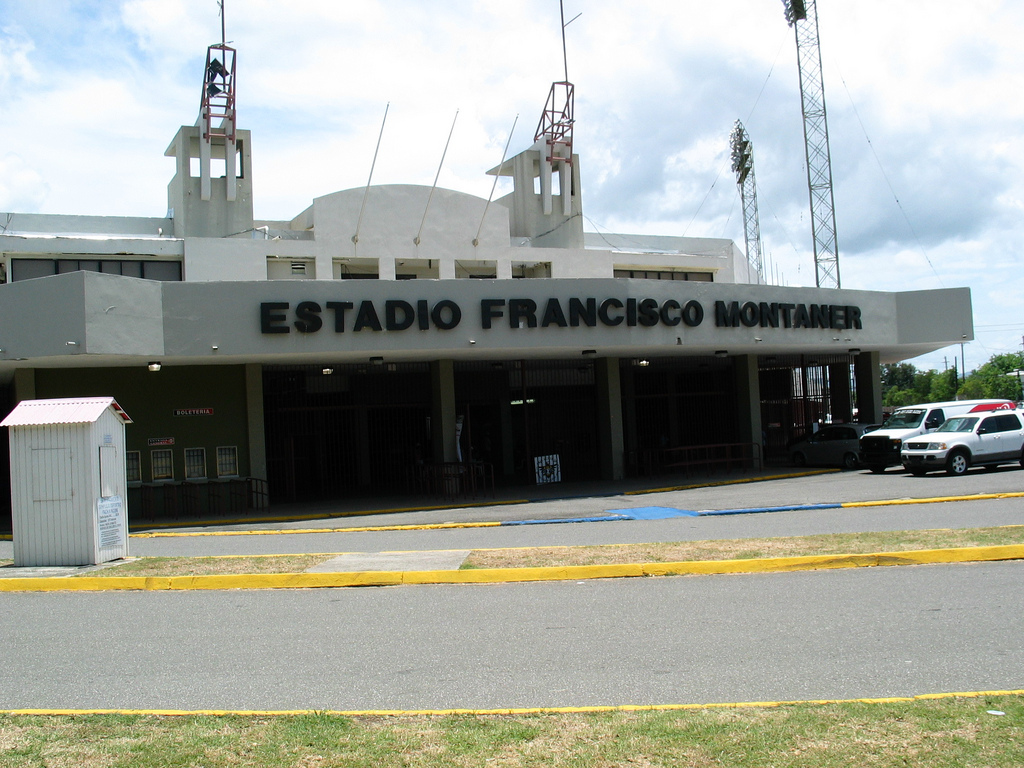
- The host stadium – Francisco "Paquito" Montaner Stadium
- Purpose: Track and field sports, athletes worldwide participate
- Frequency: Yearly
- Inaugurated: 2007; 19 years ago
- Most recent: 23 May 2015; 11 years ago
- Presidente: José E. Costas Loyola
- Headquarters: Ponce, Puerto Rico
- Remarks: Organized by Voluntarios por Ponce, Inc.
- Website: purclassic.com

The Ponce Grand Prix de Atletismo is a track and field competition held yearly in Ponce, Puerto Rico at the Francisco Montaner Stadium. The event started in 2007, after the successful hosting of the 2006 Ibero-American Championships. It was considered among the most important athletic events in the Caribbean based on the competitive and organizational quality of the event. Starting with the 2012 season, the Ponce Grand Prix joined the IAAF World Challenge competitions until 2015 and represented the only other city in the Americas, outside Kingston, Jamaica, and Rio de Janeiro, Brazil in the circuit. The event was relaunched in 2022 named Puerto Rico International Athletics Classic as part of the silver level scheduled World Athletics Continental Tour.

== History ==
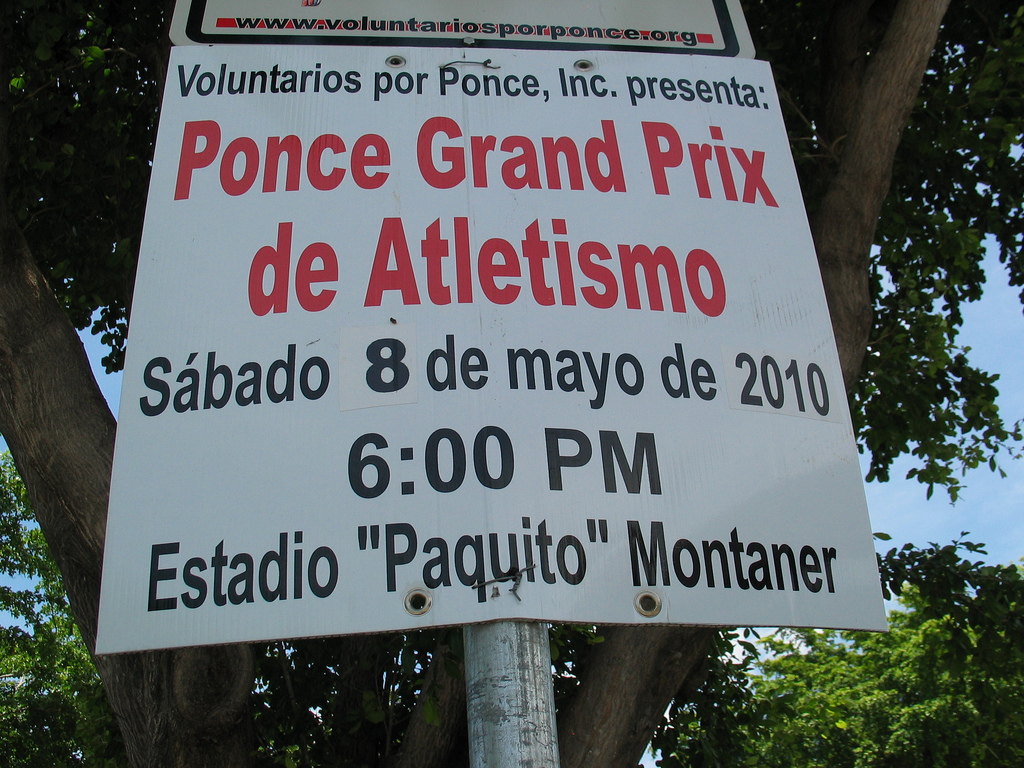
Sign on the grounds of the Paquito Montaner Stadium announces the Ponce Grand Prix

In early seasons the event was one of three competitions in the IAAF-NACAC circuit beside the Adidas Track Classic in Carson, California, and the Jamaica Invitational in Kingston, Jamaica, where competitors accumulated points in the IAAF rankings system.

The 2009 Ponce Grand Prix was witnessed live by some 9,000 fans at the Francisco Montaner Stadium, plus hundreds of thousands more throughout the Americas via satellite television. This edition was considered to have initiated “the greatest feat in Puerto Rican sports history”, as new records were established, and a local hero surfaced, Javier Culson, competing in the 400 metres hurdles. He was later crowned Athlete of the Year in Puerto Rico.

The relaunched 2022 edition saw eleven meet records fall with eight of them were Puerto Rican all-comers' records.

== Meet records ==
=== Men ===
Men's meeting records of the Ponce Grand Prix de Atletismo
Event	Record	Athlete	Nationality	Date	Ref.
100 m	9.92 (−0.2 m/s)	Trayvon Bromell	United States	12 May 2022	
200 m	20.21 (+1.2 m/s)	Brendan Christian	Antigua and Barbuda	17 May 2008	
300 m	31.52	Steven Gardiner	Bahamas	12 May 2022	
400 m	44.14	Lashawn Merritt	United States	17 May 2014	
800 m	1:44.79	Duane Solomon	United States	17 May 2014	
1500 m	3:36.64	Geoffrey Kipkoech Rono	Kenya	19 May 2007	
3000 m	8:02.71	Andrew Poore	United States	18 May 2013	
110 m hurdles	13.12 (±0.0 m/s)	David Oliver	United States	8 May 2010	
400 m hurdles	47.72	Javier Culson	Puerto Rico	8 May 2010	
Pole vault	5.60 m	Lázaro Borges	Cuba	12 May 2012	
Long jump	8.27 m (+0.9 m/s)	Brian Johnson	United States	17 May 2008	
Triple jump	16.88 m (+2.0 m/s)	Donald Scott	United States	12 May 2022	
Shot put	22.75 m	Ryan Crouser	United States	12 May 2022	
Hammer throw	79.31 m	Krisztián Pars	Hungary	17 May 2014	
Javelin throw	75.32 m	Curtis Moss	Canada	12 May 2012	
4 × 100 m relay	38.83	Brian Mariano; Geronimo Goeloe; Prince Kwidama; Churandy Martina	Netherlands Antilles	17 May 2008	
4 × 400 m relay	3:04.93	Yoel Tapia; Arismendy Peguero; Pedro Mejía; Félix Sánchez	Dominican Republic	19 May 2007	

=== Women ===
Men's meeting records of the Ponce Grand Prix de Atletismo
Event	Record	Athlete	Nationality	Date	Ref.
100 m	10.93 (−0.8 m/s)	Elaine Thompson-Herah	Jamaica	12 May 2022	
200 m	22.37 (+0.3 m/s)	Tianna Madison	United States	12 May 2012	
400 m	50.42	Athing Mu	United States	12 May 2022	
800 m	1:59.35	Rose Mary Almanza	Cuba	23 May 2015	
1500 m	4:05.96	Adelle Tracey	Great Britain	12 May 2022	
3000 m	8:53.38	Gabe Grunewall	United States	17 May 2014	
100 m hurdles	12.50 (+0.3 m/s)	Alaysha Johnson	United States	12 May 2022	
400 m hurdles	54.09	Janieve Russell	Jamaica	12 May 2022	
3000 m steeplechase	9:37.62	Genevieve Lacaze	Australia	18 May 2013	
Pole vault	4.72 m	Sandi Morris	United States	12 May 2022	
Long jump	6.78 m (+0.5 m/s)	Ese Brume	Nigeria	12 May 2022	
Triple jump	13.66 m (+0.5 m/s)	Luvia Saldivar	Cuba	18 May 2013	
Hammer throw	72.16 m	Amanda Bingson	United States	17 May 2014	
Javelin throw	59.47 m	Yainelis Ribeaux	Cuba	12 May 2012	
4 × 100 m relay	43.58	USA Team A Kellie Wells; Moushami Robinson; Tianna Madison; Gloria Asumnu	United States	8 May 2010	
