= Gwen Berry =

American track and field athlete

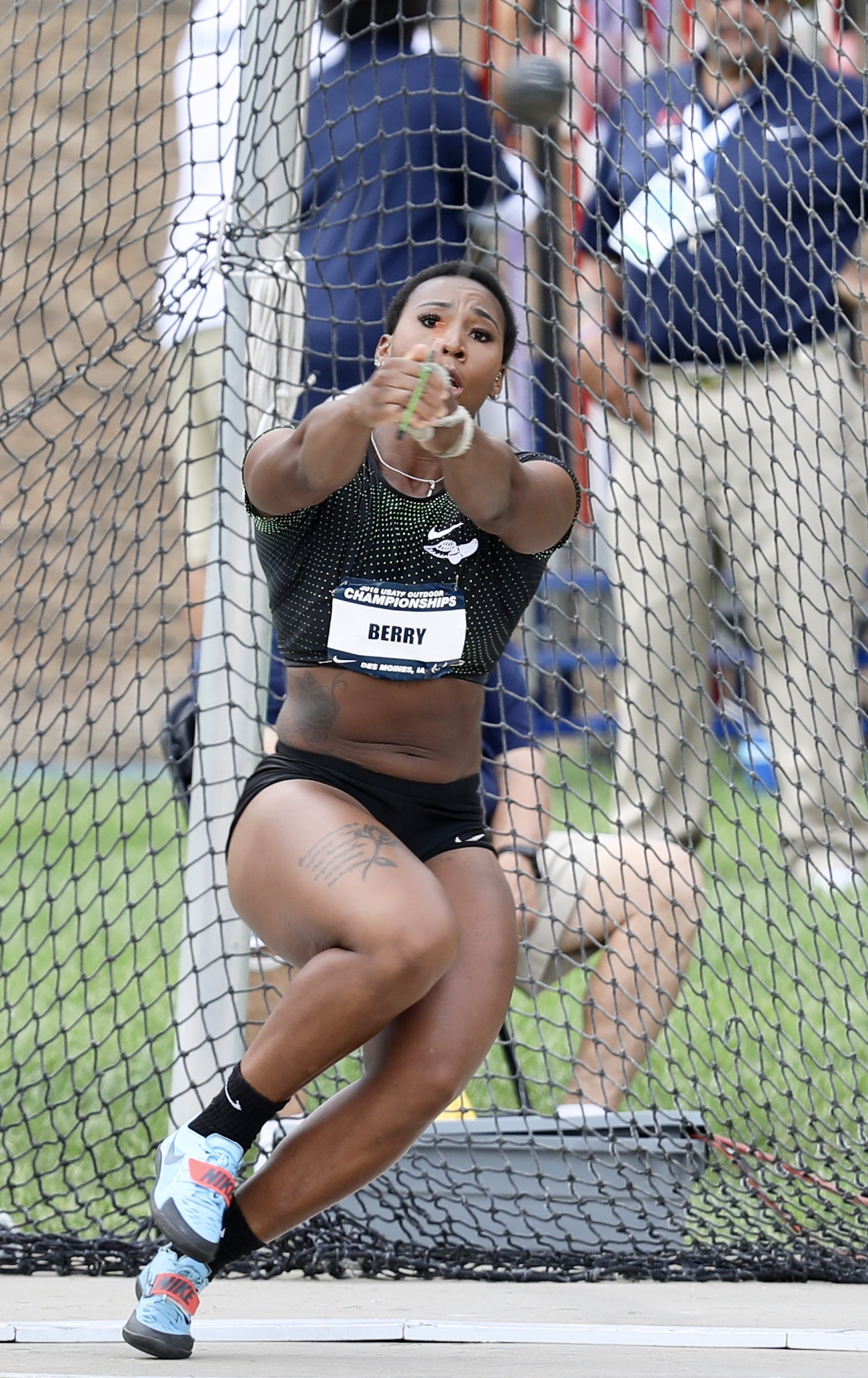
- Berry in 2018

Personal information
- Born: June 29, 1989 (age 37) St. Louis, Missouri, U.S.
- Height: 5 ft 10 in (178 cm)
- Weight: 88 kg (194 lb)

Sport
- Country: United States
- Sport: Track and field
- Event: Hammer throw
- College team: Southern Illinois University Carbondale
- Club: NYAC & NIKE
- Turned pro: 2011
Medal record
Pan American Games
Gold medal – first place	2019 Lima	Hammer
Pan American Sports Festival
Gold medal – first place	2014 Mexico City	Hammer

Gwendolyn Denise Berry (born June 29, 1989) is an American track and field athlete who specializes in the hammer throw. Her mark of 77.78 m (255 ft 2 in) on June 8, 2018, ranks her #7 on the all-time list. She also holds the world record in the weight throw with a mark of 25.60 m (83 ft 11 3/4 in) set in March 2017. She is a three-time national champion in the weight throw at the USA Indoor Track and Field Championships. She was the gold medalist in the hammer at the 2014 Pan American Sports Festival. She is also the 2019 Pan American Games Champion.

== Career ==
=== Early life and college ===
Gwen Berry was born to Michael Berry and Laura Hayes; she grew up in Florissant, Missouri and attended McCluer High School. While there she was a basketball player but started taking part in track in the off-season and competed in the triple jump. She began studying for a degree in psychology and criminal justice at Southern Illinois University Carbondale in 2007. She took up throwing events for the Southern Illinois Salukis collegiate team and came fourth in the hammer throw at the 2008 USA Junior Championships.

Her throwing improved the following year and she was the Missouri Valley Conference (MVC) champion in the weight throw and shot put and reached eleventh in the former event at the NCAA Indoor Championships. In 2010, she earned NCAA All-American honours in the weight throw and shot put indoors and the hammer throw outdoors (taking fourth at the 2010 NCAA Outdoors). That season she set bests of 16.30 m (53 ft 5 1/2 in) for the shot put, 20.48 m (67 ft 2 1/4 in) for the weight throw and 62.55 m (205 ft 2 1/2 in) for the hammer throw.

Berry's international debut for the United States came at the 2010 NACAC Under-23 Championships in Athletics. She took the hammer bronze, behind Heather Steacy and fellow Salukis athlete Jeneva McCall.

In her last season at Southern Illinois, Berry reached new peaks. A shot put best of 16.99 m (55 ft 8 3/4 in) brought her the MVC outdoor title and she later placed twelfth at the 2011 Championships. In the weight throw she 22.71 m (74 ft 6 in) in Bloomington, Indiana, which placed her second in the world for the event that year behind Amber Campbell. She entered as favourite for the weight throw at the NCAA Indoor Championships, but performed poorly, ending in tenth, and commented that she was psychologically affected by being one of the smaller athletes there. Moving to the outdoor season, she threw a personal record to win the hammer at the Drake Relays. Her mark of 70.52 m (231 ft 4 1/4 in) ranked her in the world's top 25 athletes for the year. Nerves again affected her at the 2012 NCAA Outdoor Championships, as she failed to reach the final despite being the country's third best thrower that year, behind Jessica Cosby and Amber Campbell.

=== Professional ===
After graduation, Berry continued competing with a focus on weight throw in the indoor season and hammer throw in the outdoor season. At the 2011 USA Outdoor Track and Field Championships she ranked sixth. In the 2012 season she came third in the weight throw at the 2012 USA Indoor Track and Field Championships. A new hammer best of 71.95 m (236 ft 1/2 in) came in April and she entered the 2012 United States Olympic Trials as the number two ranked American woman after Jessica Cosby. She did not live up to her previous performance, however, and ended in seventh with a mark of 68.84 m (225 ft 10 in). Despite the failure, she was approached by New York Athletic Club, who encouraged her to join them and remain in the sport.

Berry secured her first national title at the 2013 USA Indoors, launching the weight throw 24.70 m (81 ft 1/4 in) to beat out a field including Amber Campbell and Jeneva McCall. She achieved a best of 73.81 m (242 ft 1 3/4 in) for the hammer that year, but again did not perform well at the 2013 USA Outdoor Track and Field Championships, placing ninth. She defended her weight throw national title in 2014. The 2014 season marked her first foray into the international professional circuit and she ranked eighth on the 2014 IAAF Hammer Throw Challenge. She was seventh at the 2014 USA Outdoor Track and Field Championships, but was still selected for the Pan American Sports Festival. There, she came away with a gold medal in a season's best of 72.04 m (236 ft 4 in) and beat three-time world champion Yipsi Moreno of Cuba, whose career was an inspiration for Berry. She enjoyed her highest world ranking that season, placing 17th overall.

Berry skipped the 2015 indoor season and again competed on the circuit, placing tenth in the 2015 IAAF Hammer Throw Challenge final standings (second only to Amanda Bingson among Americans). Berry cleared seventy metres for the first time nationally at the 2015 USA Outdoor Track and Field Championships, but strong performances by Campbell, DeAnna Price and Bingson left her in fifth place overall.

At the start of 2016, Berry was dominant in the weight throw, winning four straight meetings with throws over 24 meters, including a third career win at the 2016 USA Indoor Track and Field Championships, and ranking number one globally for the season. Her hammer throw was also much improved with consistent throws beyond seventy meters. Although a throw of 76.31 m (250 ft 4 1/4 in) at the Tucson Elite Classic was initially recorded as a national record, that distance along with all of Berry's performances from March to June 2016 were annulled due to violation of anti-doping procedures.

Berry placed second in hammer throw behind Team USA teammates Amber Campbell, ahead of DeAnna Price at 2016 Olympic Trials and represented the United States at 2016 Summer Olympics. She placed 14th.

At the 2020 Olympic Trials, Berry placed third in the hammer throw behind DeAnna Price and Brooke Anderson and represented the United States at the 2020 Summer Olympics, where she qualified for the final and finished 11th.

== Doping violations ==
Berry has received two doping violation suspensions issued by USADA during her career. In 2016 she received a three-month suspension for using a prohibited medication. In August 2023, Berry was given a 16-month suspension by USADA after testing positive for spironolactone.

== Support for U.S. national anthem kneeling protests ==
During the award ceremony in the 2019 Pan American Games in Lima, Peru, Berry was awarded the gold medal for the hammer throw. She raised her fist at the end of the playing of "The Star-Spangled Banner" in protest against “injustice” in America "and a president who's making it worse." Berry's protests led the U.S. Olympic and Paralympic Committee to issue new guidelines in order to allow peaceful expressions of protest "in support of racial and social justice for all human beings." Berry has stated: "I'm here to represent those who died [due] to this systemic racism."

The International Olympic Committee reprimanded Berry and placed her on probation for 12 months, prohibiting her from any form of protest for a year. Her act cost her sponsorships, and she estimated that she lost $50,000.

In June 2021, during the U.S. Olympic track and field trials for the 2020 Tokyo Olympics, Berry turned away from the U.S. flag during the playing of "The Star-Spangled Banner". She said of the national anthem's timing that "I feel like it was a set-up". According to a spokesperson for USA Track and Field who stated, "The national anthem is played every day according to a previously published schedule", the anthem was scheduled to be played at 5:20 p.m., though on this occasion the music started at 5:25 p.m. Berry says an official told her the anthem would play prior to her arrival on the podium. Berry has accused critics of her protest of favoring "patriotism over basic morality."

== Personal records ==
Outdoor

- Shot put – 16.99 m (2011) Cedar Falls (USA)
- Hammer throw – 77.78 m (2018)

Indoor

- Shot put – 16.30 m (2010) Charleston (USA)
- Weight throw – 25.60m (2017) (WR) Albuquerque (USA)

== International competitions ==
Year	Competition	Venue	Position	Event	Notes
2010	NACAC U23 Championships	Miramar, United States	3rd	Hammer throw	62.55 m
2014	Pan American Sports Festival	Mexico City, Mexico	1st	Hammer throw	72.04 m
2016	Olympic Games	Rio de Janeiro, Brazil	14th (q)	Hammer throw	69.90 m
2017	World Championships	London, United Kingdom	14th (q)	Hammer throw	69.12 m
2019	Pan American Games	Lima, Peru	1st	Hammer throw	74.62 m
2019	World Championships	Doha, Qatar	10th (q)	Hammer throw	71.72 m^{1}
2021	Olympic Games	Tokyo, Japan	11th	Hammer throw	71.35 m

^{1}No mark in the final

== National titles ==
- USA Indoor Track and Field Championships
  - Weight throw: 2013, 2014, 2016
- USA Outdoor Track and Field Championships
  - Hammer throw: 2017

== See also ==
- Olympic Games
- United States at the Olympics
- Women's sports
- Performative activism
