= Kuwait at the 2017 World Championships in Athletics =

- WA code: KUW

in London
- Competitors: 3 in 2 events
- Medals: Gold 0 Silver 0 Bronze 0 Total 0

World Championships in Athletics appearances
- 1983; 1987; 1991; 1993; 1995; 1997; 1999; 2001; 2003; 2005; 2007; 2009; 2011; 2013; 2015; 2017; 2019; 2022; 2023

Kuwait competed at the 2017 World Championships in Athletics in London, United Kingdom, from 4–13 August 2017.

== Results ==
(q – qualified, NM – no mark, SB – season best)

=== Men ===
Track and road events

Athlete	Event	Heat		Semifinal		Final	
Athlete	Event	Result	Rank	Result	Rank	Result	Rank
Ebrahim Al-Zofairi	800 metres	1:46.29 PB	16 q	1:46.68	18	Did not advance	
Abdulaziz Al-Mandeel	110 metres hurdles	13.63	29	Did not advance			
Yaqoub Mohamed Al-Youha	110 metres hurdles	13.56	21 q	DNF	–	Did not advance	
