= Amanda Bingson =

American hammer thrower (born 1990)

Personal information
- Born: February 20, 1990 (age 36) Victorville, California
- Height: 1.75 m (5 ft 9 in)
- Weight: 96 kg (212 lb)

Sport
- Country: United States
- Sport: Athletics
- Event: Hammer throw
- College team: UNLV Rebels Texas State University
- Club: New York Athletic Club
- Turned pro: 2013

Achievements and titles
- Personal bests: Hammer throw – 75.73 m (248 ft 5 1/4 in) (2016) Des Moines (USA); Weight throw – 22.42 m (73 ft 6 1/2 in) (2013) Albuquerque (USA)

Amanda Yvette Bingson (born February 20, 1990) is an American track and field athlete specializing in the hammer throw. She is the former American record holder in the event with a distance of 75.73 m (248 ft 5 1/4 in) set at the 2013 USA Outdoor Track and Field Championships.

Bingson attended school at the University of Nevada, Las Vegas where she is a school record holder and majored in interdisciplinary studies. She had only taken up the hammer throw in 2009 as a college freshman and has continued to improve since then. A month before the trials, she finished fourth at the NCAA Women's Outdoor Track and Field Championships. Prior to that, she was a shot put and discus thrower at Silverado High School in Las Vegas, where her team won the state championship twice and where she finished second in the 2008 shot put.

She qualified to join the Olympic team by finishing second in the hammer throw at the 2012 United States Olympic Trials, throwing 71.78 m (235 ft 5 3/4 in) (reaching the A standard) in the 4th round. At the Olympics, she did not advance past the qualifying round, finishing 28th overall.

Bingson appeared on one of the covers for the 2015 ESPN The Magazine The Body Issue.

Amanda Bingson placed fourth in hammer behind Team USA teammates Amber Campbell, Gwen Berry and DeAnna Price at 2016 United States Olympic Trials (track and field) and was an alternate to represent the United States in the hammer at the 2016 Olympics.

== Education ==
- Silverado High School in Las Vegas, Nevada, 2008
- University of Nevada, Las Vegas, Interdisciplinary Studies, formerly Sociology, 2013

== Family ==
She and her older sister, Morgan, are the two daughters of Sue and Pat Bingson of Paradise, Nevada.

== Achievements ==
Year	Competition	Venue	Position	Notes
Representing the United States
2012	NACAC U23 Championships	Irapuato, Mexico	1st	71.39 m (234 ft 2 1/2 in) A
2012	Olympic Games	London, United Kingdom	28th (q)	67.29 m (220 ft 9 in)
2013	World Championships	Moscow, Russia	10th	72.56 m (238 ft 1/2 in)
2014	World Continental Cup	Marrakesh, Morocco	2nd	72.38 m (237 ft 5 1/2 in)
2015	World Championships	Beijing, China	9th	72.35 m (237 ft 4 1/4 in)
