= Paavo Nurmi Games =

Finnish track and field meet

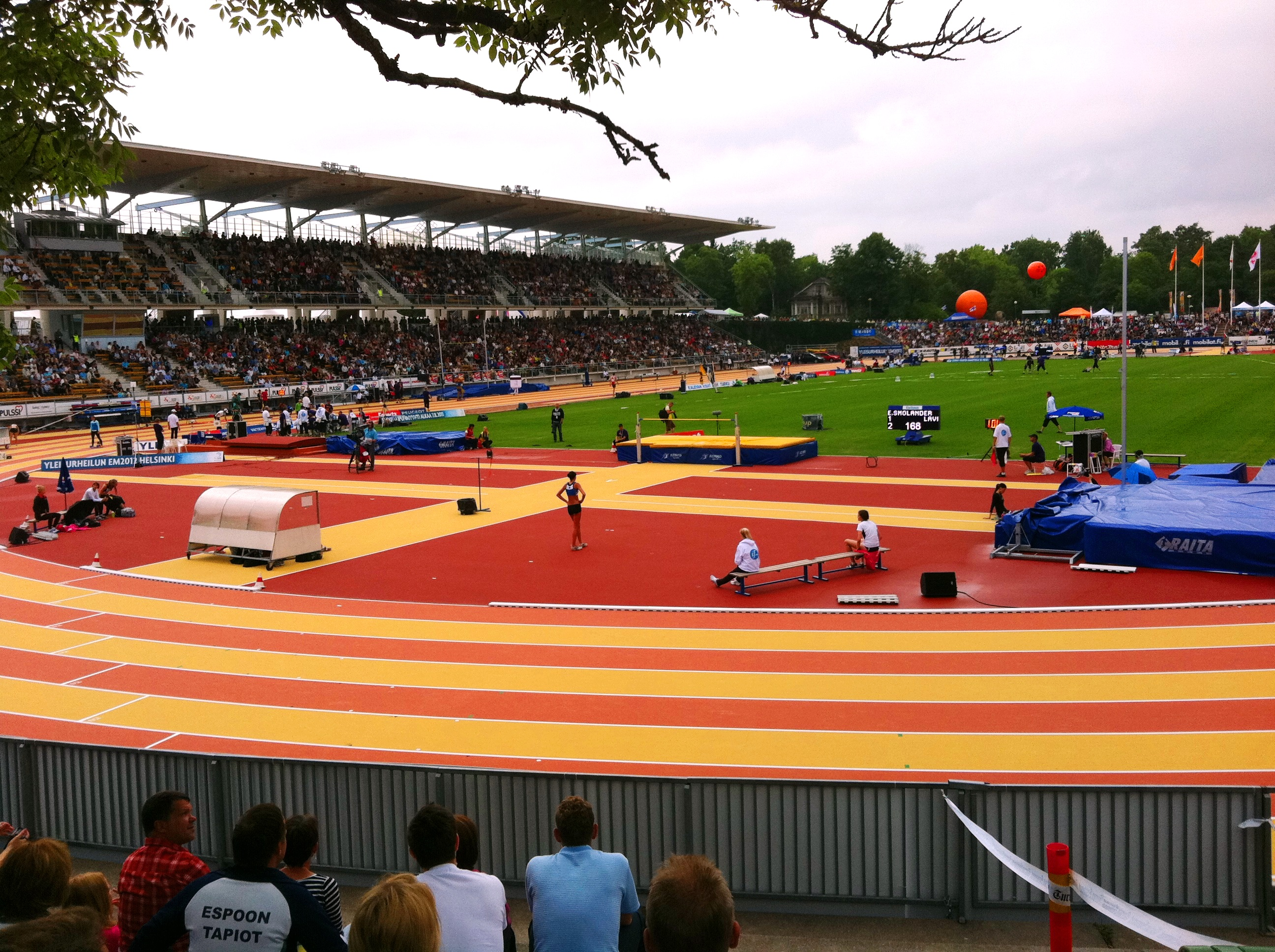
- Date: June–August
- Location: Paavo Nurmi Stadium, Turku, Finland
- Event type: Track and field
- Established: 1957
- Website: paavonurmigames.fi/en/

The Paavo Nurmi Games is an annual track and field meet that takes place at Paavo Nurmi Stadium in Turku, Finland. It was first held in 1957. The competition has been part of the IAAF World Challenge since 2017.

== Meeting records ==
=== Men ===
Men's meeting records of the Paavo Nurmi Games
Event	Record	Athlete	Nationality	Date	Ref.
100 m	9.92 (+1.5 m/s)	Marcell Jacobs	Italy	18 June 2024	
200 m	20.23 (±0.0 m/s)	Ramil Guliyev	Turkey	5 June 2018	
800 m	1:43.52	Max Burgin	United Kingdom	14 June 2022	
1500 m	3:31.82	Mohamed Attaoui	Spain	3 June 2026	
3000 m	7:44.36	Sadik Mikhou	Bahrain	13 June 2017	
5000 m	12:55.95	Josephat Menjo	Kenya	18 August 2010	
110 m hurdles	13.17 (+1.1 m/s)	Andrew Pozzi	United Kingdom	11 August 2020	
400 m hurdles	47.82	Rasmus Mägi	Estonia	14 June 2022	
3000 m steeplechase	8:11.52	Mohamed Tindouft	Morocco	3 June 2026	
Pole vault	6.00 m	Emmanouil Karalis	Greece	3 June 2026	
Long jump	8.14 (−1.9 m/s)	Godfrey Mokoena	South Africa	24 June 2009	
Triple jump	17.21 (+1.6 m/s)	Zhu Yaming	China	11 June 2019	
Shot put	21.23 m	Al Feuerbach	United States	1 August 1974	
Shot put	21.23 m	Augie Wolf	United States	26 June 1984	
Discus throw	70.62 m	Daniel Ståhl	Sweden	14 June 2022	
Hammer throw	82.40 m	Paweł Fajdek	Poland	13 June 2017	
Javelin throw	91.49 m	Johannes Vetter	Germany	11 August 2020	

=== Women ===
Women's meeting records of the Paavo Nurmi Games
Event	Record	Athlete	Nationality	Date	Ref.
100 m	11.09 (−0.8 m/s)	Daryll Neita	United Kingdom	14 June 2022	
800 m	1:58.73	Anita Horvat	Slovenia	13 June 2023	
1500 m	4:03.69	Melissa Courtney-Bryant	United Kingdom	11 August 2020	
3000 m	8:38.65	Meskerem Mamo	Ethiopia	5 June 2018	
100 m hurdles	12.48 (+1.6 m/s)	Nia Ali	United States	14 June 2022	
400 m hurdles	54.32	Jessie Knight	Great Britain	13 June 2023	
3000 m steeplechase	9:16.18	Alemnat Walle	Ethiopia	3 June 2026	
High jump	2.01 m	Nicola Olyslagers	Australia	13 June 2023	
Pole vault	4.80 m	Nina Kennedy	Australia	18 June 2024	
Long jump	6.88 m (+0.7 m/s)	Monae' Nichols	United States	3 June 2026	
Triple jump	14.51 (+0.4 m/s)	Senni Salminen	Finland	8 June 2021	
Shot put	20.66 m	Chase Jackson	United States	3 June 2026	
Discus throw	66.22 m	Sandra Perković	Croatia	5 June 2018	
Hammer throw	80.09 m	Camryn Rogers	Canada	3 June 2026	
Javelin throw	66.63 m	Christin Hussong	Germany	7 June 2021	
