= Janusz Kusociński Memorial =

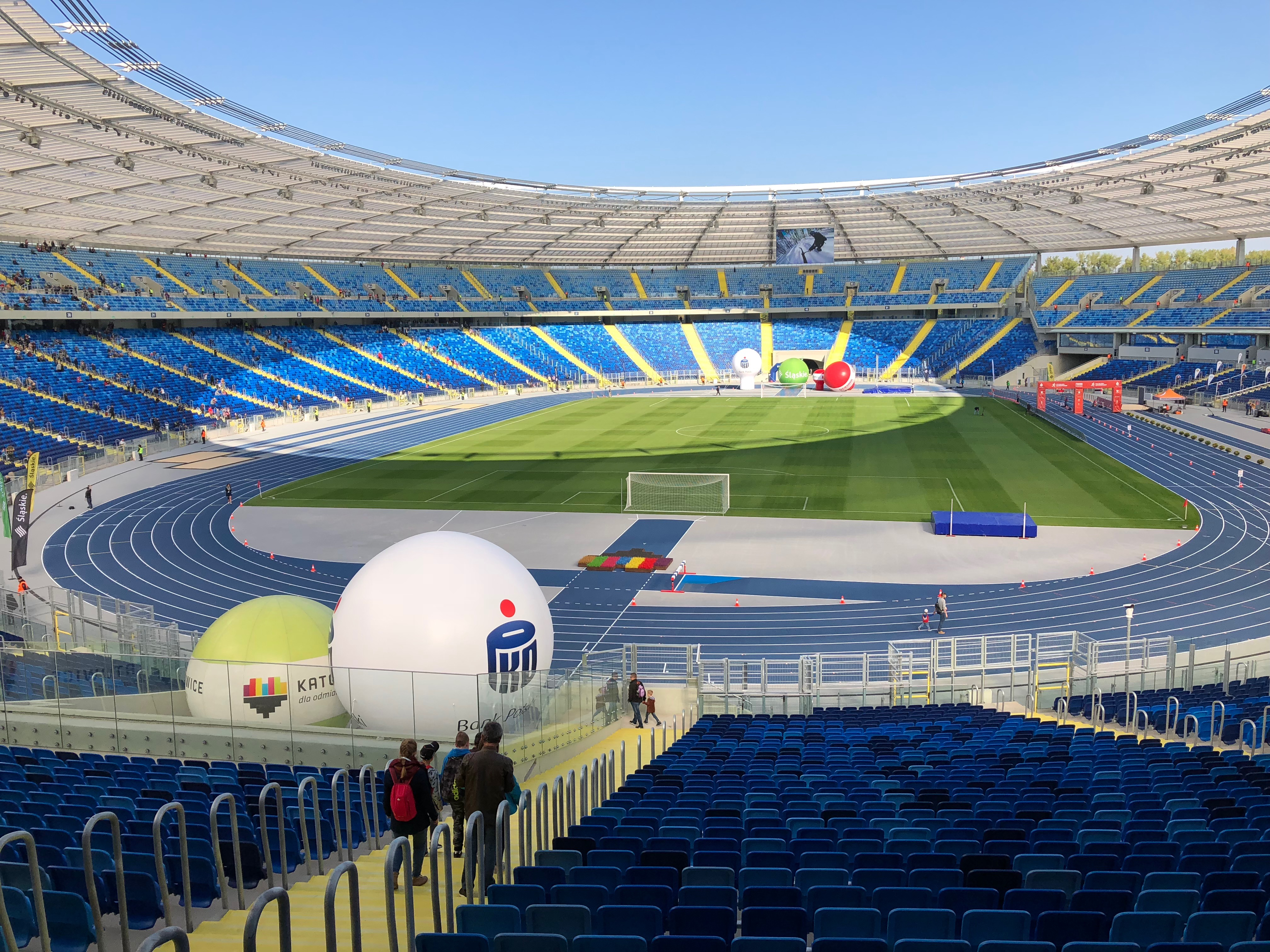
- Silesian Stadium
- Date: June–August
- Location: Chorzów, Poland
- Event type: Track and field
- Established: 1954
- Website: Janusz Kusociński Memorial

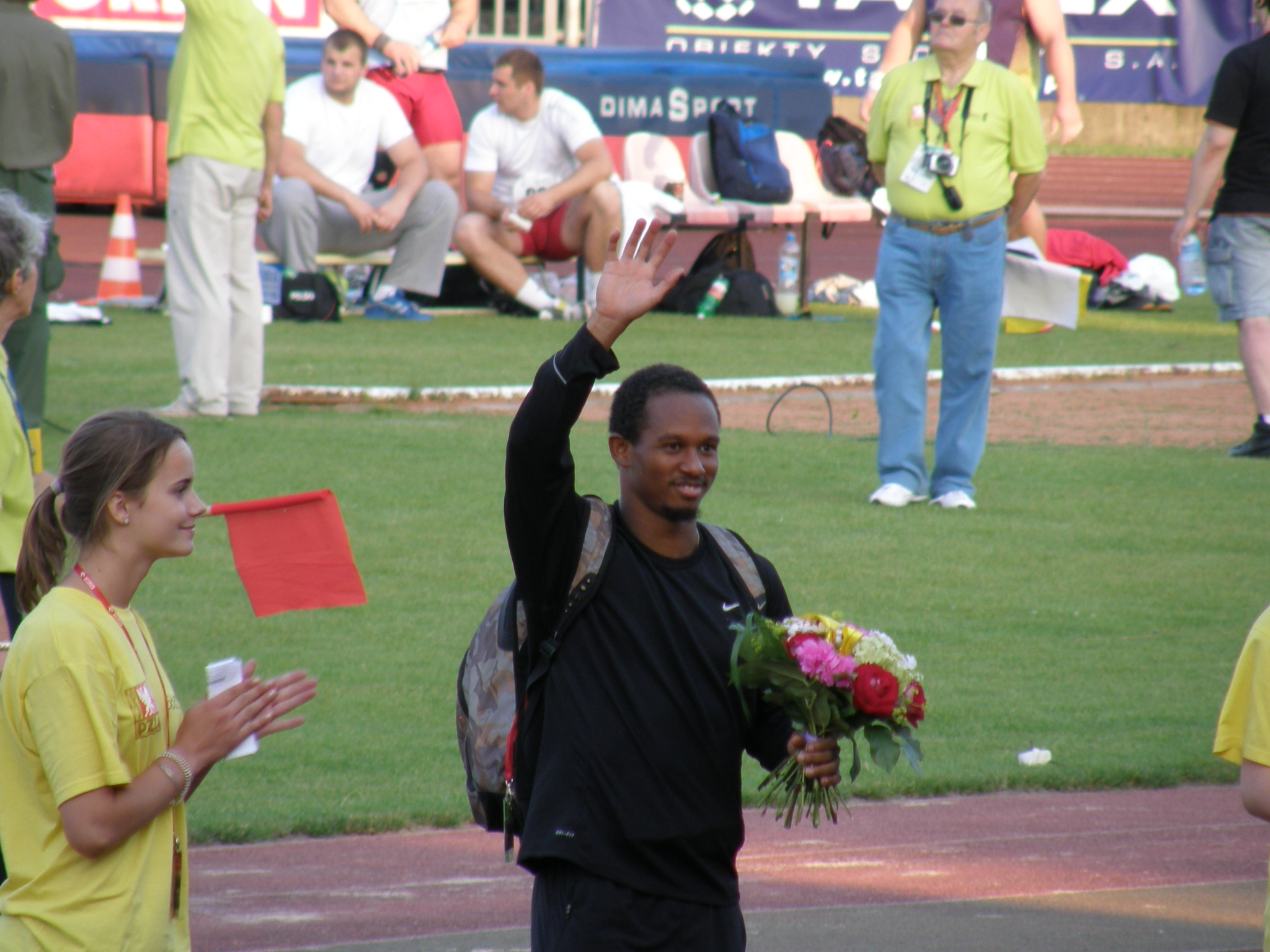
Jamaican sprinter Michael Frater receiving a garland at the 2010 event

The Janusz Kusociński Memorial (Polish: Memoriał Janusza Kusocińskiego) is an annual track and field meeting at different venues in Poland, in recent times at the Silesian Stadium in Chorzów, Poland.

The meeting was first held in 1954 in memory of the Polish runner Janusz Kusociński, the 1932 Olympic champion over 10,000 metres, who was killed on 21 June 1940 during the German AB-Aktion Operation. The event was located at the 10th-Anniversary Stadium in Warsaw for much of its early history. Later on, the meet venue changed to a rotational basis and the memorial was held in cities such as Lublin, Bydgoszcz, Poznań, Szczecin and most recently Chorzów. In 2022 the meeting was part of the 2022 World Athletics Continental Tour on gold level.

From its inception to the present day, the Janusz Kusociński Memorial has attracted world record holders and Olympic medallists. Initially attracting top Eastern European athletes (including Soviet Olympic champion Vladimir Kuts at the first competition), Frenchman Michel Jazy, American Bill Nieder, and China's Ni Zhiqin were among the participants in its first decade. The 1970s saw runners Ron Clarke and Filbert Bayi compete, while the 1980s featured performers including Wolfgang Schmidt and Sergey Bubka. Among the world record breakers to appear at the memorial in the 1990s were Svetlana Masterkova, Wilson Kipketer and Jan Železný. Numerous Olympic, World and European Championship level athletes continue to take part on an annual basis.

Each edition features a long-distance memorial race. This event has been dominated by East African athletes in the last decade. In addition to the memorial race, the meeting typically has high calibre performances in the throwing events.

The meeting, which holds European Athletics Outdoor Meetings status, is among the foremost Polish track and field competitions, alongside the annual Pedro's Cup events.

== Meet records ==
=== Men ===
Men's meeting records of the Janusz Kusociński Memorial
Event	Record	Athlete	Nationality	Date	Venue	Ref.
100 m	10.00 (+2.0 m/s)	Marian Woronin	Poland	1984	Warsaw	
200 m	20.06	Silvio Leonard	Cuba	1978		
400 m	44.47	Isaac Makwala	Botswana	20 June 2021	Chorzów	
800 m	1:43.66	Alberto Juantorena	Cuba	1977		
1500 m	3:35.77	Nicholas Kemboi	Kenya	2010	Warsaw	
3000 m	7:43.67	Sammy Kipketer	Kenya	1999		
5000 m	13:31.09	Hansjörg Kunze	East Germany	1979		
10,000 m	28:41.02	Ryszard Kopijasz	Poland	1980		
Marathon	2:36:06	Józef Russek	Poland	1956		
110 m hurdles	13.25 (+0.5 m/s)	Sergey Shubenkov	Russia		Chorzów	
110 m hurdles	13.25 (+1.0 m/s)	Orlando Ortega	Spain	25 August 2020	Chorzów	
400 m hurdles	49.00	Kemel Thompson	Jamaica	2000		
3000 m steeplechase	8:21.2 h	Bronisław Malinowski	Poland	1974		
High jump	2.36 m	Artur Partyka	Poland	1996		
Pole vault	5.92 m	Chris Nilsen	United States	5 June 2022	Chorzów	
Long jump	8.37 m	James Beckford	Jamaica	2007		
Triple jump	17.48 m	Danil Burkenya	Russia	2007		
Shot put	22.31 m	Tomas Walsh	New Zealand	5 June 2022	Chorzów	
Discus throw	68.50 m	Virgilijus Alekna	Lithuania	21 July 2012	Szczecin	
Hammer throw	83.93 m	Paweł Fajdek	Poland	9 August 2015	Szczecin	
Javelin throw	91.50 m	Jan Železný	Czechoslovakia	1994		
Decathlon	8118 pts	Ryszard Skowronek	Poland	1973		
Mile walk	5:35.49	Maher Ben Hlima	Poland	4 June 2023	Chorzów	
5000 m walk (track)	18:41.79	Robert Korzeniowski	Poland	1997		
10,000 m walk (track)	40:32.8	Daniel Bautista	Mexico	1978		
20 km walk (road)	1:20.52	Zdzisław Szlapkin	Poland	1988		
20 km walk (road)	1:20.52	Robert Korzeniowski	Poland	1995		
4 × 100 m relay	38.65	Zbigniew Tulin; Łukasz Chyła; Marcin Jędrusiński; Marcin Urbaś	Poland	2004		
4 × 400 m relay	3:06.6 h		Great Britain	1964		

=== Women ===
Women's meeting records of the Janusz Kusociński Memorial
Event	Record	Athlete	Nationality	Date	Venue	Ref.
100 m	11.03 (−0.7 m/s)	Marie-Josée Ta Lou	Ivory Coast	4 June 2023	Chorzów	
100 m	11.03 (+0.4 m/s)	Ewa Swoboda	Poland	4 June 2023	Chorzów	
200 m	22.61	Ewa Kasprzyk	Poland	1985	Warsaw	
400 m	49.75	Irena Szewińska	Poland	1976	Bydgoszcz	
600 m	1:25.04	Joanna Jóźwik	Poland	9 August 2015	Szczecin	
800 m	1:56.2	Anita Weiß	East Germany	1978		
1500 m	3:54.01	Gudaf Tsegay	Ethiopia	20 June 2021	Chorzów	
3000 m	9:07.57	Purity Rionoripo	Kenya	21 July 2012	Szczecin	
100 m hurdles	12.36 (+1.9 m/s)	Grażyna Rabsztyn	Poland	12 June 1980	Warsaw	
400 m hurdles	54.73	Vania Stambolova	Bulgaria	2011	Szczecin	
3000 m steeplechase	9:39.51	Mercy Wanjiku	Kenya	2010	Warsaw	
High jump	1.99 m	Kamila Lićwinko	Poland	18 June 2016	Szczecin	
Pole vault	4.70 m	Svetlana Feofanova	Russia	2011	Szczecin	
Long jump	6.91 m	Agata Karczmarek	Poland	1996		
Triple jump	14.50 m	Olha Saladukha	Ukraine	2010	Warsaw	
Shot put	21.41 m	Helena Fibingerová	Czech Republic	1980	Warsaw	
Discus throw	66.58 m	Ilke Wyludda	Germany	1995		
Hammer throw	79.61 m	Anita Włodarczyk	Poland	18 June 2016	Szczecin	
Javelin throw	56.72 m	Barbara Madejczyk	Poland	21 July 2012	Szczecin	
Mile walk (track)	6:27.76	Olga Chojecka	Poland	4 June 2023	Chorzów	
3000 m walk (track)	13:01.72	Katarzyna Mosio	Poland	1992		
5000 m walk (track)	26:10.5	Agnieszka Wyszyńska	Poland	1981		
10,000 m walk (track)	43:28	Katarzyna Radtke	Poland	1995		
4 × 100 m relay	43.58		Poland	1999		
4 × 400 m relay	3:34.0 h		Poland	1972		
