= Golden Spike Ostrava =

Annual track and field meeting

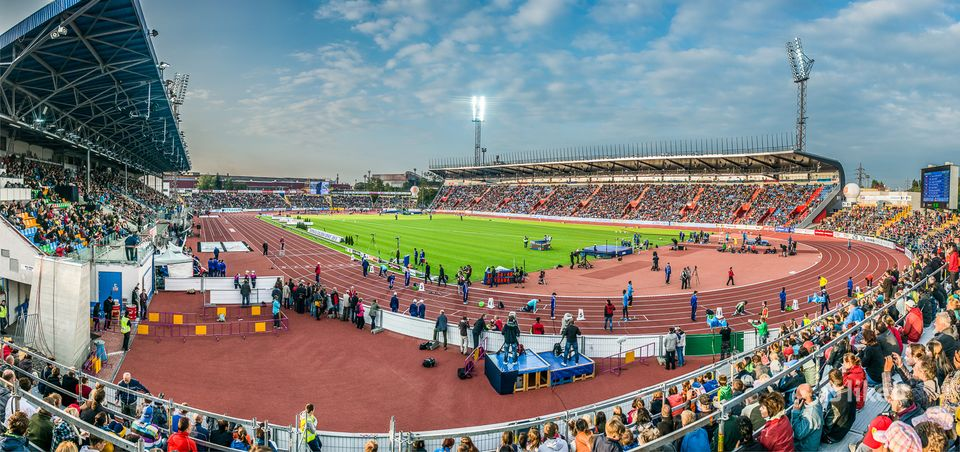
- Golden Spike in 2013
- Date: May–June
- Location: Ostrava, Czech Republic
- Event type: Track and field
- Established: 1961
- Website: zlatatretra.cz/eng/home-en

Golden Spike (Czech: Zlatá tretra) is an annual athletics event at the Městský Stadion in Ostrava-Vítkovice, Czech Republic as part of the IAAF World Challenge Meetings. It is a Gold-level meeting on the World Athletics Continental Tour — one of the top tiers just below the Diamond League. It was first organized in 1961.

The history of the meeting was interrupted in 1999, when the meeting was not held due to the apparent lack of interest of sponsors. From 2003 to 2009 the IAAF classified the Zlatá tretra meeting among IAAF Grand Prix meetings.

== World records ==
Over the course of its history, numerous world records have been set at the Golden Spike.

World records set at the Golden Spike Ostrava
Year	Event	Record	Athlete	Nationality
1973	100 m	10.9 h	Renate Stecher	East Germany
1975	100 m	9.9 h	Silvio Leonard	Cuba
2002	3000 m steeplechase	9:21.72	Alesya Turova	Belarus
2004	Pole vault	4.83 m	Stacy Dragila	United States
2004	10,000 m	26:20.31	Kenenisa Bekele	Ethiopia
2007	20,000 m (track)	56:25.98+	Haile Gebrselassie	Ethiopia
2007	One hour	21,285 m	Haile Gebrselassie	Ethiopia
2008	One hour	18,517 m	Dire Tune	Ethiopia
2008	110 m hurdles	12.87 (+0.9 m/s)	Dayron Robles	Cuba
2010	100 y	9.07+ (−0.5 m/s) ^{[WB]}	Asafa Powell	Jamaica
2011	100 y	9.91+ (+1.1 m/s) ^{[WB]}	Veronica Campbell-Brown	Jamaica
2017	300 m	30.81 ^{[WB]}	Wayde van Niekerk	South Africa
2019	300 m	34.41 ^{[WB]}	Shaunae Miller-Uibo	Bahamas
2022	300 m hurdles	36.86 ^{[WB]}	Femke Bol	Netherlands
2026	150m (bend)	14.67 (±0.0 m/s) ^{[WB]}	Noah Lyles	United States

== Meeting records ==
=== Men ===
Men's meeting records of the Golden Spike Ostrava
Event	Record	Athlete	Nationality	Date	Ref.
100 y	9.07+ (−0.5 m/s)	Asafa Powell	Jamaica	27 May 2010	
100 m	9.83 (−0.5 m/s)	Asafa Powell	Jamaica	27 May 2010	
150 m	14.67 (±0.0 m/s)	Noah Lyles	United States	16 June 2026	
200 m	19.83 (+0.3 m/s)	Usain Bolt	Jamaica	12 June 2008	
300 m	30.81	Wayde van Niekerk	South Africa	28 June 2017	
400 m	44.16	LaShawn Merritt	United States	17 June 2014	
600 m	1:16.02	Adam Kszczot	Poland	26 May 2015	
800 m	1:43.24	Wilfred Bungei	Kenya	12 June 2003	
1000 m	2:15.08	Ilham Tanui Özbilen	Turkey	17 June 2014	
1500 m	3:29.05	Phanuel Koech	Kenya	24 June 2025	
Mile	3:49.44	Nathan Green	United States	16 June 2026	
3000 m	7:31.66	Caleb Ndiku	Kenya	17 June 2014	
5000 m	12:48.63	Jacob Kiplimo	Uganda	8 September 2020	
10,000 m	26:20.31	Kenenisa Bekele	Ethiopia	8 June 2004	
20,000 m (track)	56:25.98+	Haile Gebrselassie	Ethiopia	27 June 2007	
One hour	21,285 m	Haile Gebrselassie	Ethiopia	27 June 2007	
110 m hurdles	12.87 (+0.9 m/s)	Dayron Robles	Cuba	12 June 2008	
400 m hurdles	47.62	Karsten Warholm	Norway	8 September 2020	
2000 m steeplechase	5:27.89	Nikolay Matyushenko	Soviet Union	29 July 1989	
3000 m steeplechase	7:58.68	Lamecha Girma	Ethiopia	31 May 2022	
High jump	2.38 m	Mutaz Essa Barshim	Qatar	13 June 2018	
Pole vault	6.13 m	Armand Duplantis	Sweden	24 June 2025	
Long jump	8.66 m (+1.0 m/s)	Juan Miguel Echevarría	Cuba	13 June 2018	
Triple jump	17.57 m (−1.1 m/s)	Christian Taylor	United States	28 June 2017	
Shot put	22.63 m	Ryan Crouser	United States	27 June 2023	
Discus throw	68.55 m	Kristjan Čeh	Slovenia	27 June 2023	
Hammer throw	83.44 m	Paweł Fajdek	Poland	27 June 2017	
Javelin throw	95.52 m (old design)	Uwe Hohn	East Germany	12 June 1985	
Javelin throw	94.64 m (current design)	Jan Železný	Czechoslovakia	31 May 1996	
10,000 m walk (track)	41:58.6 h	Alexander Bílek	Czech Republic	9 July 1969	
4 × 100 m relay	38.43	Jeremiah Azu; Zharnel Hughes; Richard Kilty; Nethaneel Mitchell-Blake	Great Britain	31 May 2022	
4 × 400 m relay	3:01.49	Jerome Davis; Derek Mills; James Carter; Danny McCray	United States	31 May 2001	

=== Women ===
Women's meeting records of the Golden Spike Ostrava
Event	Record	Athlete	Nationality	Date	Ref.
100 y	9.91+ (+1.1 m/s)	Veronica Campbell-Brown	Jamaica	31 May 2011	
100 m	10.76 (+1.1 m/s)	Veronica Campbell-Brown	Jamaica	31 May 2011	
150 m	16.56 (+0.6 m/s)	Dafne Schippers	Netherlands	8 September 2020	
200 m	22.07 (−1.0 m/s)	Jarmila Kratochvílová	Czechoslovakia	3 June 1981	
300 m	34.41	Shaunae Miller-Uibo	Bahamas	20 June 2019	
400 m	49.15	Salwa Eid Naser	Bahrain	24 June 2025	
800 m	1:54.45	Audrey Werro	Switzerland	16 June 2026	
1000 m	2:40.08	Irina Krakoviak	Lithuania	9 June 2005	
1500 m	3:57.38	Diribe Welteji	Ethiopia	27 June 2023	
2000 m	5:27.50	Genzebe Dibaba	Ethiopia	17 June 2014	
3000 m	8:38.55	Belaynesh Oljira	Ethiopia	20 May 2016	
5000 m	14:30.18	Meseret Defar	Ethiopia	27 June 2007	
10,000 m	30:26.67	Tirunesh Dibaba	Ethiopia	27 June 2013	
One hour	18,517 m	Dire Tune	Ethiopia	12 June 2008	
20,000 m (track)	1:05:35.3	Dire Tune	Ethiopia	17 June 2009	
100 m hurdles	12.42 (±0.0 m/s)	Jasmine Camacho-Quinn	Puerto Rico	27 June 2023	
300 m hurdles	36.86	Femke Bol	Netherlands	31 May 2022	
400 m hurdles	53.32	Zuzana Hejnova	Czech Republic	27 June 2013	
3000 m steeplechase	9:11.33	Norah Jeruto	Kenya	13 June 2018	
High jump	2.06 m	Mariya Lasitskene	Authorised Neutral Athletes	20 June 2019	
Pole vault	4.84 m	Molly Caudery	Great Britain	28 May 2024	
Long jump	7.00 m (+0.1 m/s)	Eva Murková	Czech Republic	23 May 1984	
Triple jump	15.00 m (±0.0 m/s)	Yamilé Aldama	Cuba	12 June 2003	
Shot put	21.96 m	Helena Fibingerová	Czech Republic	8 June 1977	
Discus throw	69.52 m	Zdeňka Šilhavá	Czech Republic	10 June 1987	
Hammer throw	79.72 m	Anita Włodarczyk	Poland	27 June 2017	
Javelin throw	67.78 m	Barbora Špotáková	Czechoslovakia	25 May 2012	
3000 m walk (track)	11:52.38	Anežka Drahotová	Czech Republic	26 May 2015	
4 × 100 m relay	43.56	Gréta Kerekes; Jusztina Csóti; Boglárka Takács; Alexa Sulyán	Hungary	27 June 2023	
4 × 400 m relay	3:33.9	Edit Molnár; Agnes Kozáry; Noémi Bátori; Judit Forgács	Hungary	3 August 1991	
