= Krisztián Pars =

Hungarian hammer thrower

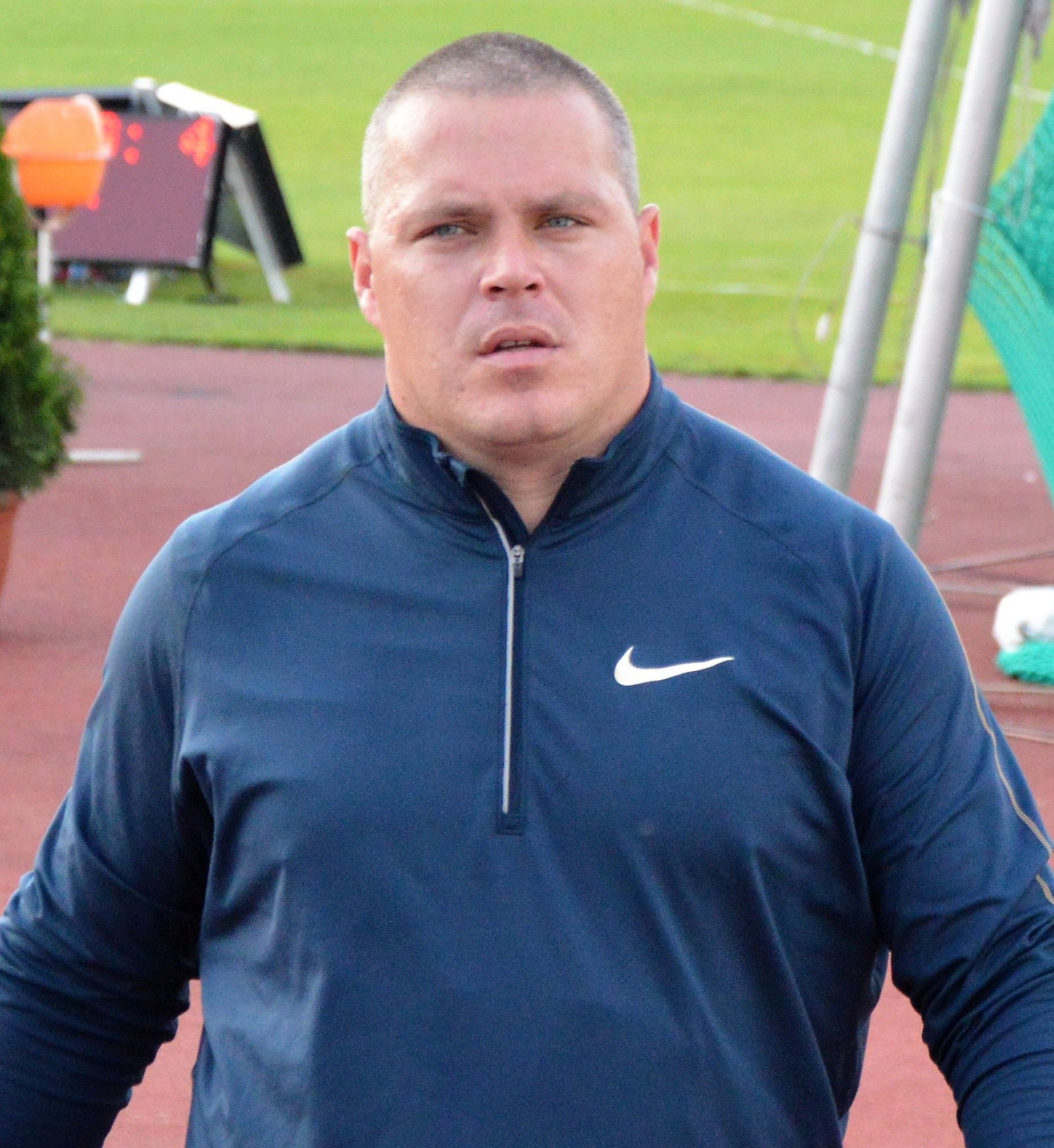
- Pars in 2013

Personal information
- Born: 18 February 1982 (age 44) Körmend, Hungary
- Height: 1.88 m (6 ft 2 in)
- Weight: 117 kg (258 lb)

Sport
- Country: Hungary
- Sport: Athletics
- Event: Hammer Throw
- Coached by: Zsolt Németh

Achievements and titles
- Personal best: 82.69 m
Medal record
Olympic Games
Gold medal – first place	2012 London	Hammer throw
World Championships
Silver medal – second place	2011 Daegu	Hammer throw
Silver medal – second place	2013 Moscow	Hammer throw
European Championships
Gold medal – first place	2012 Helsinki	Hammer throw
Gold medal – first place	2014 Zurich	Hammer throw
Bronze medal – third place	2010 Barcelona	Hammer throw
Continental Cup
Gold medal – first place	2014 Marrakesh	Hammer throw

Krisztián Pars (Hungarian pronunciation: [ˈkristiaːn ˈpɒrʃ]; born 18 February 1982) is a Hungarian hammer thrower. He competed at the Summer Olympics in 2004, 2008, and 2012, winning the gold medal in 2012. He also won the 2012 and 2014 European championships.

== Career ==
His personal best throw is 82.69 metres, achieved at the 2014 European Championships in Zurich. Pars previously held the world junior record (6 kg) with 81.35 metres, achieved in September 2001 in Szombathely. He took fourth place at the 2008 Beijing Olympics. He was initially upgraded to the silver medal after the doping disqualification of original medallists Vadim Devyatovskiy and Ivan Tsikhan in December 2008, but both had their medals reinstated two years later. That same year he won the silver medal in the hammer at the 2008 European Winter Throwing Cup meeting in Split and another silver at the 2008 IAAF World Athletics Final.

In the 2009 season, he began well with a victory at the 2009 European Winter Throwing Cup, but missed out on a major medal at the 2009 World Championships in Athletics with a fourth-place finish. He took the bronze at the 2009 IAAF World Athletics Final, the last year the competition was held.

He won the bronze medal at the 2010 European Athletics Championships, his first medal of the championships. At the end of the year he took part in the Pál Németh Memorial (a meeting in honour of his mentor Pál Németh), winning his second title of the competition with a throw of 78.34 metres. At the 2012 London Olympics he took the gold in the hammer throw with a winning toss of 80.59 m.

On 10 April 2018, he was banned until July 2019 because of a doping violation. He apologized to everybody for making a bad decision in a hard situation at a birthday party, as he tried something he had never before while being drunk. Later, based on public information from the AIU (Athletics Integrity Unit), it was revealed that cocaine was found in his blood.

== Achievements ==
Year	Competition	Venue	Position	Notes
Representing Hungary
1999	World Youth Championships	Bydgoszcz, Poland	1st	74.76 m (5 kg)
2003	European U23 Championships	Bydgoszcz, Poland	1st	77.25 m
2004	Olympic Games	Athens, Greece	4th	78.73 m
2004	World Athletics Final	Szombathely, Hungary	3rd	79.17 m
2005	World Championships	Helsinki, Finland	5th	78.03 m
2005	World Athletics Final	Szombathely, Hungary	5th	78.32 m
2006	European Championships	Gothenburg, Sweden	6th	78.34 m
2006	World Athletics Final	Stuttgart, Germany	3rd	80.41 m
2007	World Championships	Osaka, Japan	5th	80.93 m
2007	World Athletics Final	Stuttgart, Germany	2nd	78.42 m
2008	Olympic Games	Beijing, China	4th	80.96 m
2008	World Athletics Final	Stuttgart, Germany	2nd	79.37 m
2009	World Championships	Berlin, Germany	4th	77.45 m
2009	World Athletics Final	Thessaloniki, Greece	3rd	77.49 m
2010	European Championships	Barcelona, Spain	3rd	79.06 m
2011	World Championships	Daegu, South Korea	2nd	81.18 m
2012	European Championships	Helsinki, Finland	1st	79.72 m
2012	Olympic Games	London, United Kingdom	1st	80.59 m
2013	World Championships	Moscow, Russia	2nd	80.30 m
2014	European Championships	Zurich, Switzerland	1st	82.69 m
2015	World Championships	Beijing, China	4th	77.32 m
2016	Olympic Games	Rio de Janeiro, Brazil	7th	75.28 m
2017	World Championships	London, United Kingdom	14th (q)	74.08 m
2019	World Championships	Doha, Qatar	22nd (q)	73.05 m
2022	European Championships	Munich, Germany	–	NM

== Awards ==
- Hungarian youth athlete of the year (1): 1999
- Hungarian junior athlete of the year (1): 2001, 2002
- Cross of Merit of the Republic of Hungary – Bronze Cross (2004)
- Hungarian athlete of the Year (8): 2007, 2008, 2009, 2011, 2012, 2013, 2014, 2015
- Person of the year in Vas County (2008)
- Order of Merit of the Republic of Hungary – Knight's Cross (2008)
- For Homeland honour (2012)
- Honorary Citizen of Szentgotthárd (2012)
- Order of Merit of Hungary – Officer's Cross (2012)
