= Ugarci =

Ugarci may refer to:

- Ugarci (Bosansko Grahovo), a village in Bosnia and Herzegovina
- Ugarci (Trebinje), a village in Bosnia and Herzegovina
- Ugarci, Croatia, a village in Croatia
