= Vidovci shooting =

1995 mass shooting in Croatia

- Location: Vidovci, Požega, Požega-Slavonia County, Slavonia, Croatia
- Date: 6 July 1995
- Attack type: Mass shooting, bombing, murder–suicide
- Weapon: Zastava M70
- Deaths: 7 (including the perpetrator)
- Perpetrator: Josip Capan Joko

The Vidovci shooting was a mass shooting that occurred on July 6, 1995, at Vidovci, Požega, Požega-Slavonia County, Slavonia, Croatia. Josip Capan Joko killed 6 members of the Tolić family.

== Shooting ==
On the evening of 5 July 1995, in Vidovci, former legionnaire Josip Capan Joko, then aged 44, was arrested for masturbating in front of the Tolić family home. He then decided to take revenge for it. On 6 July 1995, Josip Capan fatally shot six members of the Tolić family in the head. The victims consisted of a father, mother, three children and a grandmother. He then detonated an explosive device in their home, killing himself.
