= Crkveni Vrhovci =

- Village
- Location within Croatia
- Coordinates: 45°17′18″N 17°39′06″E
- Country: Croatia
- Region: Slavonia
- County: Požega-Slavonia County
- City: Požega

Area
  - Total: 7.0 km^{2} (2.7 sq mi)
- Elevation: 351 m (1,152 ft)

Population (2021)
  - Total: 18
  - Density: 2.6/km^{2} (6.7/sq mi)
- Time zone: UTC+1 (CET)
  - Summer (DST): UTC+2 (CEST)
- Postal code: 34000
- Area code: 034

Crkveni Vrhovci is a village in Požega-Slavonia County, Croatia. The village is administered as a part of the city of Požega. According to national census of 2011, population of the village is 30.
