= Dervišaga =

- Village
- Location within Croatia
- Coordinates: 45°19′46″N 17°44′13″E
- Country: Croatia
- Region: Slavonia
- County: Požega-Slavonia County
- City: Požega

Area
  - Total: 5.3 km^{2} (2.0 sq mi)
- Elevation: 143 m (469 ft)

Population (2021)
  - Total: 732
  - Density: 140/km^{2} (360/sq mi)
- Time zone: UTC+1 (CET)
  - Summer (DST): UTC+2 (CEST)
- Postal code: 34000
- Area code: 034

Dervišaga is a village in Požega-Slavonia County, Croatia. The village is administered as a part of the City of Požega.

According to national census of 2011, population of the village is 890. It is connected by the D38 state road.
