= Alilovci =

Settlement in Požega-Slavonia County, Croatia

- settlement
- Interactive map of Alilovci
- Location within Croatia
- Coordinates: 45°23′46″N 17°42′11″E
- Country: Croatia
- County: Požega-Slavonia
- Municipality: Kaptol

Area
  - Total: 4.0 km^{2} (1.5 sq mi)

Population (2021)
  - Total: 318
  - Density: 80/km^{2} (210/sq mi)
- Time zone: UTC+1 (CET)
  - Summer (DST): UTC+2 (CEST)
- Postal code: 34000 Požega
- Area code: +385 (0)34

Alilovci is a settlement in the Municipality of Kaptol in Croatia. In 2021, its population was 318.

== Demographics ==
Alilovci: Population trends 1857–2021
v

population	192	197	194	226	269	299	314	358	355	359	358	416	463	454	470	410	318
	1857	1869	1880	1890	1900	1910	1921	1931	1948	1953	1961	1971	1981	1991	2001	2011	2021

Sources: Croatian Bureau of Statistics publications
