= Novo Selo, Požega-Slavonia County =

Novo Selo
- Village
- Location within Croatia
- Coordinates: 45°19′08″N 17°37′56″E
- Country: Croatia
- Region: Slavonia
- County: Požega-Slavonia County
- City: Požega

Area
  - Total: 5.1 km^{2} (2.0 sq mi)
- Elevation: 177 m (581 ft)

Population (2021)
  - Total: 370
  - Density: 73/km^{2} (190/sq mi)
- Time zone: UTC+1 (CET)
  - Summer (DST): UTC+2 (CEST)
- Postal code: 34000
- Area code: 034

Novo Selo is a village in Požega-Slavonia County, Croatia. The village is administered as a part of the City of Požega. According to national census of 2001, population of the village is 414. The etymology of the village comes from Slavic languages meaning new village, Novo Selo.
