= Gradski Vrhovci =

- Village
- Location within Croatia
- Coordinates: 45°18′01″N 17°38′17″E
- Country: Croatia
- Region: Slavonia
- County: Požega-Slavonia County
- City: Požega

Area
  - Total: 7.7 km^{2} (3.0 sq mi)
- Elevation: 339 m (1,112 ft)

Population (2021)
  - Total: 16
  - Density: 2.1/km^{2} (5.4/sq mi)
- Time zone: UTC+1 (CET)
  - Summer (DST): UTC+2 (CEST)
- Postal code: 34000
- Area code: 034

Gradski Vrhovci is a village in Požega-Slavonia County, Croatia. The village is administered as a part of the City of Požega. According to national census of 2011, population of the village is 46.
