= Turnić =

Turnić may refer to:

- Turnić, Požega-Slavonia County, a village near Požega, Croatia
- Turnić, Rijeka, a section of Rijeka, Croatia
