= Bankovci =

Bankovci can refer to one of the following towns:

- Bankovci, Požega-Slavonia County, a village near Požega, Croatia
- Bankovci, Virovitica-Podravina County, a village near Zdenci, Croatia
- Bankovci, Serbia, a village near Crna Trava
