= Kunovci =

Kunovci can refer to one of the following towns:

- Kunovci, Bosnia and Herzegovina
- Kunovci, Croatia
