= Seoci =

Seoci, which translates as Villages from Serbo-Croatian, can refer to one of the following settlements:

== In Bosnia and Herzegovina ==
- Seoci (Gornji Vakuf)
- Seoci (Jajce)
- Seoci (Vareš)

== In Croatia ==
- Seoci, Croatia
