= Laze Prnjavor =

- Village
- Location within Croatia
- Coordinates: 45°17′09″N 17°42′05″E
- Country: Croatia
- Region: Slavonia
- County: Požega-Slavonia County
- City: Požega

Area
  - Total: 6.0 km^{2} (2.3 sq mi)
- Elevation: 328 m (1,076 ft)

Population (2021)
  - Total: 7
  - Density: 1.2/km^{2} (3.0/sq mi)
- Time zone: UTC+1 (CET)
  - Summer (DST): UTC+2 (CEST)
- Postal code: 34000
- Area code: 034

Laze Prnjavor is a village in Požega-Slavonia County, Croatia. The village is administered as a part of the City of Požega. According to national census of 2011, the population of the village is 7.
