= Emovački Lug =

- Village
- Location within Croatia
- Coordinates: 45°21′09″N 17°37′40″E
- Country: Croatia
- Region: Slavonia
- County: Požega-Slavonia County
- City: Požega

Area
  - Total: 1.3 km^{2} (0.50 sq mi)
- Elevation: 206 m (676 ft)

Population (2021)
  - Total: 23
  - Density: 18/km^{2} (46/sq mi)
- Time zone: UTC+1 (CET)
  - Summer (DST): UTC+2 (CEST)
- Postal code: 34000
- Area code: 034

Emovački Lug is a village in Požega-Slavonia County, Croatia. The village is administered as a part of the City of Požega. According to national census of 2011, population of the village is 32.
