= Nova Lipa, Croatia =

Nova Lipa
- Village
- Location within Croatia
- Coordinates: 45°21′38″N 17°36′47″E
- Country: Croatia
- Region: Slavonia
- County: Požega-Slavonia County
- City: Požega

Area
  - Total: 2.4 km^{2} (0.93 sq mi)
- Elevation: 218 m (715 ft)

Population (2021)
  - Total: 61
  - Density: 25/km^{2} (66/sq mi)
- Time zone: UTC+1 (CET)
  - Summer (DST): UTC+2 (CEST)
- Postal code: 34000
- Area code: 034

Nova Lipa is a village in Požega-Slavonia County, Croatia. The village is administered as a part of the City of Požega. According to national census of 2011, population of the village is 88.
