= Novi Štitnjak =

- Village
- Location within Croatia
- Coordinates: 45°21′40″N 17°39′15″E
- Country: Croatia
- Region: Slavonia
- County: Požega-Slavonia County
- City: Požega

Area
  - Total: 0.9 km^{2} (0.35 sq mi)
- Elevation: 202 m (663 ft)

Population (2021)
  - Total: 92
  - Density: 100/km^{2} (260/sq mi)
- Time zone: UTC+1 (CET)
  - Summer (DST): UTC+2 (CEST)
- Postal code: 34000
- Area code: 034

Novi Štitnjak is a village in Požega-Slavonia County, Croatia. The village is administered as a part of the City of Požega. According to the national census of 2001, the population of the village is 112.
