= Stara Lipa, Croatia =

Stara Lipa
- Village
- Location within Croatia
- Coordinates: 45°20′49″N 17°36′46″E
- Country: Croatia
- Region: Slavonia
- County: Požega-Slavonia County
- City: Požega

Area
  - Total: 4.7 km^{2} (1.8 sq mi)
- Elevation: 190 m (620 ft)

Population (2021)
  - Total: 159
  - Density: 34/km^{2} (88/sq mi)
- Time zone: UTC+1 (CET)
  - Summer (DST): UTC+2 (CEST)
- Postal code: 34000
- Area code: 034

Stara Lipa is a village in Požega-Slavonia County, Croatia. The village is administered as part of the City of Požega. According to the national census of 2011, the population of the village is 213.
