= Capan =

Capan is a surname. Notable people with the surname include:

- Josip Capan Joko, perpetrator of the Vidovci shooting
- Luka Capan (born 1995), Croatian footballer
- Marko Capan (born 2004), Croatian footballer
- Roger Capan (1945–2013), American speed skater
