= Šeovci =

- Village
- Location within Croatia
- Coordinates: 45°22′29″N 17°42′47″E
- Country: Croatia
- Region: Slavonia
- County: Požega-Slavonia County
- City: Požega

Area
  - Total: 2.2 km^{2} (0.85 sq mi)
- Elevation: 172 m (564 ft)

Population (2021)
  - Total: 102
  - Density: 46/km^{2} (120/sq mi)
- Time zone: UTC+1 (CET)
  - Summer (DST): UTC+2 (CEST)
- Postal code: 34000
- Area code: 034

Šeovci is a village in Požega-Slavonia County, Croatia. The village is administered as a part of the City of Požega. According to national census of 2011, population of the village is 121.
