= Krivaj =

Krivaj may refer to:

- Krivaj, Požega-Slavonia County, a village near Požega, Croatia
- Krivaj, Sisak-Moslavina County, a village near Lipovljani, Croatia
- Krivaj Sunjski, a village near Sunja, Sisak-Moslavina County, Croatia
