= Marindvor =

Marindvor may refer to:

- Marindvor (Požega), a village in the City of Požega, Croatia
- Marijin Dvor (Sarajevo), a neighborhood in Sarajevo, FBiH, BiH
