= Drškovci =

- Village
- Location within Croatia
- Coordinates: 45°19′35″N 17°38′58″E
- Country: Croatia
- Region: Slavonia
- County: Požega-Slavonia County
- City: Požega

Area
  - Total: 1.7 km^{2} (0.66 sq mi)
- Elevation: 157 m (515 ft)

Population (2021)
  - Total: 351
  - Density: 210/km^{2} (530/sq mi)
- Time zone: UTC+1 (CET)
  - Summer (DST): UTC+2 (CEST)
- Postal code: 34000
- Area code: 034

Drškovci is a village in Požega-Slavonia County, Croatia. The village is administered as a part of the City of Požega. According to national census of 2011, the population of the village is 411.
