= Kaptol, Požega-Slavonia County =

Kaptol
- Municipality
- Općina Kaptol; Municipality of Kaptol
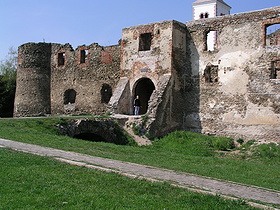

- Location within Croatia
- Coordinates: 45.4347°N 17.7261°E
- Country: Croatia
- Region: Slavonia (Požega Valley)
- County: Požega-Slavonia County

Government
  - Municipal mayor: Mile Pavičić (HDZ)

Area
  - Municipality: 85.4 km^{2} (33.0 sq mi)
  - Urban: 23.7 km^{2} (9.2 sq mi)

Population (2021)
  - Municipality: 2,605
  - Density: 30.5/km^{2} (79.0/sq mi)
  - Urban: 1,040
  - Urban density: 43.9/km^{2} (114/sq mi)
- Time zone: UTC+1 (Central European Time)
- Postal code: 34334
- Vehicle registration: PŽ
- Website: opcina-kaptol.com

Kaptol is a village and a municipality in central Slavonia, Croatia. It is located on the slopes of Papuk mountain, east of Velika and northeast of Požega.

The population of the municipality was 3,472 in 2011, in the following settlements:

- Alilovci, population 410
- Bešinci, population 88
- Češljakovci, population 268
- Doljanovci, population 244
- Golo Brdo, population 325
- Kaptol, population 1,409
- Komarovci, population 177
- Novi Bešinci, population 83
- Podgorje, population 253
- Ramanovci, population 215

In the 2011 census, 97% were Croats.
