= List of prefects of Požega-Slavonia County =

This is a list of prefects of Požega-Slavonia County.

== Prefects of Požega-Slavonia County (1993–present) ==
Croatian Democratic Union (HDZ)
Social Democratic Party of Croatia (SDP)

No.	Portrait	Name (Born–Died)	Term of Office		Party
1		Anto Bagarić (1954–)	4 May 1993	2 February 2006	HDZ
—		Željko Žilić (1952–); Acting Prefect	2 February 2006	12 May 2006	
2		Zdravko Ronko (1949–)	12 May 2006	27 December 2007	SDP
3		Rastislav Navratil (1945–)	27 December 2007	4 June 2009	SDP
4		Marijan Aladrović (1956–)	4 June 2009	6 June 2013	HDZ
5		Alojz Tomašević (1961–)	6 June 2013	20 May 2021	
6		Antonija Jozić (1978–)	21 May 2021	Incumbent	HDZ

== See also ==
- Požega-Slavonia County
