= Bankovci, Požega-Slavonia County =

Bankovci
- Village
- Location within Croatia
- Coordinates: 45°23′10″N 17°37′57″E
- Country: Croatia
- Region: Slavonia
- County: Požega-Slavonia County
- City: Požega

Area
  - Total: 1.8 km^{2} (0.69 sq mi)
- Elevation: 198 m (650 ft)

Population (2021)
  - Total: 93
  - Density: 52/km^{2} (130/sq mi)
- Time zone: UTC+1 (CET)
  - Summer (DST): UTC+2 (CEST)
- Postal code: 34000
- Area code: 034

Bankovci is a village in Požega-Slavonia County, Croatia. The village is administered as a part of the city of Požega. According to national census of 2011, population of the village is 109.
