= Zlatko Bourek =

- Born: 4 September 1929; Požega, Kingdom of Yugoslavia, (now Croatia)
- Died: 11 May 2018 (aged 88); Zagreb, Croatia
- Education: University of Zagreb

Zlatko Bourek (4 September 1929 – 11 May 2018) was a Croatian-Jewish film director, screenwriter, production designer, cartoonist and expert on Jewish culture.

== Biography ==
Bourek was born in Požega. He was raised in Osijek, where he moved at the age of 4, by his Jewish mother and Serbian stepfather. Bourek graduated in sculpture and painting at the Academy of Dramatic Art, University of Zagreb in 1955. During his career he made several theater set designs, and had many solo and group exhibitions. He had solo exhibitions in Duisburg, New York, Dubrovnik, Varaždin, Osijek and Zagreb. In 1959, Bourek started doing graphics work and in 1963 he exhibited the paintings that had all the features of his artistic creation, turned to grotesque humor and surrealistic feel of the folk element.

== Bibliography ==
- Snješka Knežević, Aleksander Laslo (2011). Židovski Zagreb. Zagreb: AGM, Židovska općina Zagreb. ISBN 978-953-174-393-8.
