= Turnić, Požega-Slavonia County =

Turnić
- Village
- Location within Croatia
- Coordinates: 45°22′48″N 17°42′20″E
- Country: Croatia
- Region: Slavonia
- County: Požega-Slavonia County
- City: Požega

Area
  - Total: 2.3 km^{2} (0.89 sq mi)
- Elevation: 166 m (545 ft)

Population (2021)
  - Total: 61
  - Density: 27/km^{2} (69/sq mi)
- Time zone: UTC+1 (CET)
  - Summer (DST): UTC+2 (CEST)
- Postal code: 34000
- Area code: 034

Turnić is a village in Požega-Slavonia County, Croatia. The village is administered as a part of the City of Požega. According to national census of 2011, population of the village was 75.
