= Seoci, Croatia =

Seoci
- Village
- Location within Croatia
- Coordinates: 45°18′22″N 17°40′33″E
- Country: Croatia
- Region: Slavonia
- County: Požega-Slavonia County
- City: Požega

Area
  - Total: 3.1 km^{2} (1.2 sq mi)
- Elevation: 243 m (797 ft)

Population (2021)
  - Total: 84
  - Density: 27/km^{2} (70/sq mi)
- Time zone: UTC+1 (CET)
  - Summer (DST): UTC+2 (CEST)
- Postal code: 34000
- Area code: 034

Seoci is a village in Požega-Slavonia County, Croatia. The village is administered as a part of the City of Požega. According to national census of 2011, population of the village is 108.
