= Vidovci =

- Village
- Location within Croatia
- Coordinates: 45°19′50″N 17°42′53″E
- Country: Croatia
- Region: Slavonia
- County: Požega-Slavonia County
- City: Požega

Area
  - Total: 5.6 km^{2} (2.2 sq mi)
- Elevation: 147 m (482 ft)

Population (2021)
  - Total: 1,264
  - Density: 230/km^{2} (580/sq mi)
- Time zone: UTC+1 (CET)
  - Summer (DST): UTC+2 (CEST)
- Postal code: 34000
- Area code: 034

Vidovci is a village in Požega-Slavonia County, Croatia. The village is administered as a part of the City of Požega. According to the 2011 national census of 2011, the population of the village is 1,582. It is connected by the D38 state road.
