= Požgaj =

Požgaj (Serbian Cyrillic: Пожгај) is a Serbo-Croatian surname. It is derived from the town of Požega, Croatia. In 1556, a Jovan Požgaj was mentioned along with 7 other Komárom vajda (vojvoda). For a longer time it is found in the Zagreb County and Međimurje County, and includes Hungarian linguistical elements, as does other surnames found in Međimurje. The family name is present from the 17th century on, also in the variant of Požegaj, while the forms have been confirmed earlier, such as Latin: Posegaj. In Hungarian, the name is spelled Poszgai or Poszgay. It may refer to:

- Zvonimir Požgaj, Croatian architect
- Aleksandar Požgaj, Serbian politician and businessman

== See also ==
- Požgajić
