= Ugarci, Croatia =

Ugarci
- Village
- Location within Croatia
- Coordinates: 45°22′34″N 17°35′53″E
- Country: Croatia
- Region: Slavonia
- County: Požega-Slavonia County
- Town: Požega

Area
  - Total: 3.9 km^{2} (1.5 sq mi)
- Elevation: 227 m (745 ft)

Population (2021)
  - Total: 43
  - Density: 11/km^{2} (29/sq mi)
- Time zone: UTC+1 (CET)
  - Summer (DST): UTC+2 (CEST)
- Postal code: 34000
- Area code: 034

Ugarci is a village in Požega-Slavonia County, Croatia. The village is administered as a part of the City of Požega. According to national census of 2011, population of the village is 57.
