= Croatian Minute Movie Cup =

Croatian Minute Movie Cup (Croatian: Hrvatski festival jednominutnih filmova) is the longest running international film festival in Croatia, held every year in Požega. The festival began in 1993.

Between 1993, when the festival began, and 2015, more than 5000 films from 79 countries were submitted.

== Sources ==
- "Hrvatski festival jednominutnih filmova". hfs.hr (in Croatian). Croatian Film Association.
- "Hrvatski festival jednominutnih filmova u kinu "Velebit"". koprivnica.hr (in Croatian). City of Koprivnica.
