= Požega villages massacre =

Mass murder of elderly Croatian Serbs

- Location: Villages near Požega, Western Slavonia, Croatia
- Date: 29 October 1991
- Target: Croatian Serb civilians
- Attack type: Mass killing
- Deaths: 44–70
- Perpetrators: 121st Brigade from Nova Gradiška and 123rd Brigade from Slavonski Požega of the Croatian Army (HV)

The Požega villages massacre was the mass murder of predominantly elderly Croatian Serbs from villages surrounding the city of Požega on 29 October 1991 by the 121st Brigade from Nova Gradiška and 123rd Brigade from Slavonski Požega units of the Croatian Army (HV).

The Slavonska Požega Crisis Committee issued an order on 28 October 1991 which was broadcast on the radio and posted on banners in the streets, for the evacuation of 26 predominantly Serb-populated villages and gave the inhabitants 48 hours to leave. The order was reportedly issued under the pretext that the villages would be protected. Shortly after the deadline, Croatian troops, led by Miljenko Crnjac, marched into the area, pillaging and burning the villages. Three were spared because they had a few Croat inhabitants. Though most of the villagers abandoned their homes, the elderly did not. Those who could not or did not want to leave were killed during the operation. The villages targeted included Vučjak Čečavački, Šnjegavić, Jeminovac and Ruševac. The Zagreb-based Serbian Democratic Forum estimates that 44 civilians were killed, more than 1,000 homes and other buildings destroyed and over 1,400 people made homeless by the operation.
