= Kunovci, Croatia =

Kunovci
- Village
- Location within Croatia
- Coordinates: 45°22′43″N 17°37′25″E
- Country: Croatia
- Region: Slavonia
- County: Požega-Slavonia County
- City: Požega

Area
  - Total: 4.3 km^{2} (1.7 sq mi)
- Elevation: 200 m (660 ft)

Population (2021)
  - Total: 82
  - Density: 19/km^{2} (49/sq mi)
- Time zone: UTC+1 (CET)
  - Summer (DST): UTC+2 (CEST)
- Postal code: 34000
- Area code: 034

Kunovci is a village in Požega-Slavonia County, Croatia. The village is administered as a part of the City of Požega. According to the national census of 2011, the population of the village is 88.

== Geography ==
Kunovci is located about 6 km north of Požega, neighboring settlements are Krivaj and Bankovci in the north, Marindvor in the south, Nova Lipa in the southwest and Ugarci in the west.
