= Krivaj, Požega-Slavonia County =

Krivaj
- Village
- Location within Croatia
- Coordinates: 45°23′59″N 17°36′59″E
- Country: Croatia
- Region: Slavonia
- County: Požega-Slavonia County
- City: Požega

Area
  - Total: 2.7 km^{2} (1.0 sq mi)
- Elevation: 230 m (750 ft)

Population (2021)
  - Total: 62
  - Density: 23/km^{2} (59/sq mi)
- Time zone: UTC+1 (CET)
  - Summer (DST): UTC+2 (CEST)
- Postal code: 34000
- Area code: 034

Krivaj is a village in Požega-Slavonia County, Croatia. The village is administered as part of the City of Požega. According to the 2001 national census, the village's population is 77.
