= Armin Pavić =

Croatian linguist

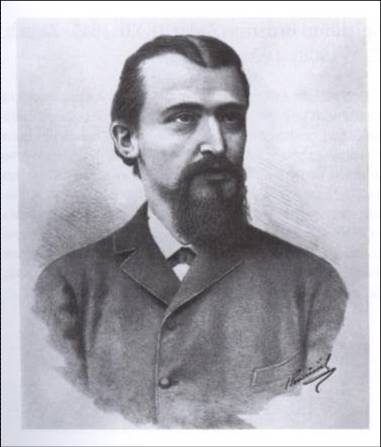
Armin Pavić

Armin Pavić (March 29, 1844 – February 11, 1914) was a Croatian linguist, university professor and rector of the University of Zagreb.

Born in Požega, he received a degree in Classical philology and Slavic studies in Vienna in 1864. After his service as a high school professor, he was elected as a professor of Croatian language and literature at the Cathedra for Serbo-Croatian language at the Faculty of Humanities and Social Sciences, University of Zagreb. In 1880 he was appointed as a full professor. He served as a dean of the faculty in two mandates, before being elected as a rector of the university in the academic year 1896/1897. After his rectorship mandate expired, he served as a prorector the following academic year.

As a university professor Pavić strove to keep the coherence of Serbo-Croatian studies, teaching simultaneously linguistic and literary-scientific courses. He became regular member of the Yugoslav Academy of Sciences and Arts in 1874. In the period of 1898-1904 he served as a head of the departments for theology and teaching, and as a parliament representative.

Pavić published theater and literary critics in many magazines, mostly in Vienac. He studied Palmotić and Gundulić, especially his Osman on which he published three papers. He died in Zagreb.
