= Antun Kanižlić =

- Born: 20 November 1699; Požega, Kingdom of Croatia-Slavonia, Habsburg Monarchy
- Died: 24 August 1777 (aged 77); Požega, Kingdom of Croatia-Slavonia, Habsburg Monarchy
- Occupations: Poet, theologist
- Writing career
- Notable works: Sveta Rožalija; Kamen pravi, smutnje velike
- Movements: Baroque, Rococo

Antun Kanižlić (20 November 1699, Požega – 24 August 1777, Požega) was a Croatian Jesuit and poet.

== Biography ==
Antun Kanižlić was born on 20 November 1699 in Požega. After finishing the gymnasium in Požega, he continued his education in Zagreb. He acted as a teacher for a few years in Zagreb and Varaždin before continuing his education in theology in Graz and Trnava. In 1721 and 1722, when he was supervising the pupil's theatre in the collegium in Zagreb, he directed and likely wrote drama pieces Pro Deo et Rege, sive Croatiae semper in Deum fides, fidelitasque pro domo Austriae (For God and the King, or Croatia's faith always in God, and loyalty to the house of Austria) and Exilium Melancholiae ex Utopia (The Exile of Melancholy from Utopia). He then became a preacher active in Zagreb, Požega, Osijek, Petrovaradin and Varaždin. From 1752 until his death, he resided in his native Požega.

He is the author of a wide array of religious and didactic books, partly original, partly translated which he wrote as his age was advancing. The most popular one Mala i svakomu potribna bogoslovica to jest nauk kerstjanski (1773), was issued five times. These religious works often contain sections written in verse, the most notable poems being Pripovijest o mladiću Urbanu (Story of young Urban) and Pisma od svetoga Alojzija (Letters of Saint Alosius), notable for their Baroque depiction of divine love, both were published in Primogući i sardce nadvladajući uzroci (Zagreb, 1760).

His most prominent work Sveta Rožalija (written c. 1759, published posthumously in 1780, Vienna), an epic poem covering the life of Saint Rosalia, makes Kanižlić one of the most representative writers of Baroque in Slavonia. The poem was highly praised, among others, by poet and aesthetics theorist Matija Petar Katančić in his De poesi illyrica (1817).

He died on 24 August 1777.

== Works ==
- Obilato duhovno mliko. Pritiskano u Zagrebu po Antunu Reineru Hervatskoga Kralyestva pritiskaru, 1754
- Bogolyubstvo na poʃctenye svetoga Francescka Saverie, Druxbe Isusove. Pritiskano u Trnavi, 1759.
- Utocsiscte Blaxenoj Divici Marii ugodno, i prietno a nami velle koriʃtno, i potribito. Na posctenye Gospe Almascke, Majke od Utocsiscta nazvane. U Mnecih, pritiskano od Antona Bassanesa, 1759.
- Mala i svakomu potribna bogoslovica. Pritiskana u Ternavi (1760, 1762), 1764, 1766, 1773
- Primoguchi i sardce nadvladajuchi uzroci. Pritiskano u Zagrebu, od Cajetana Franc. Härl, 1760
- Bogolyubnost molitvena, na poctenye Prisvete Troice jedinoga Boga, Blaxene Divice Marie, i svetih, s-razlicsitimih naucih, i iʃtomacsenyem svetih obicsajah cerkvenih. Pritiskana u Ternavi, 1766

=== Published posthumously ===
- Kamen pravi smutnye velike illiti Pocsetak, i uzrok istiniti rastavlyenya Cerkve istocsne od Zapadne. U Osiku kod Ivana Martina Divalta, 1780.
- Sveta Rožalija, full title Sveta Rožalija Panormitanska divica nakićena i ispivana po Antunu Kanižliću Požežaninu
- Kamen pravi, smutnje velike
