= Hanžeković Memorial =

Athletics event in Zagreb

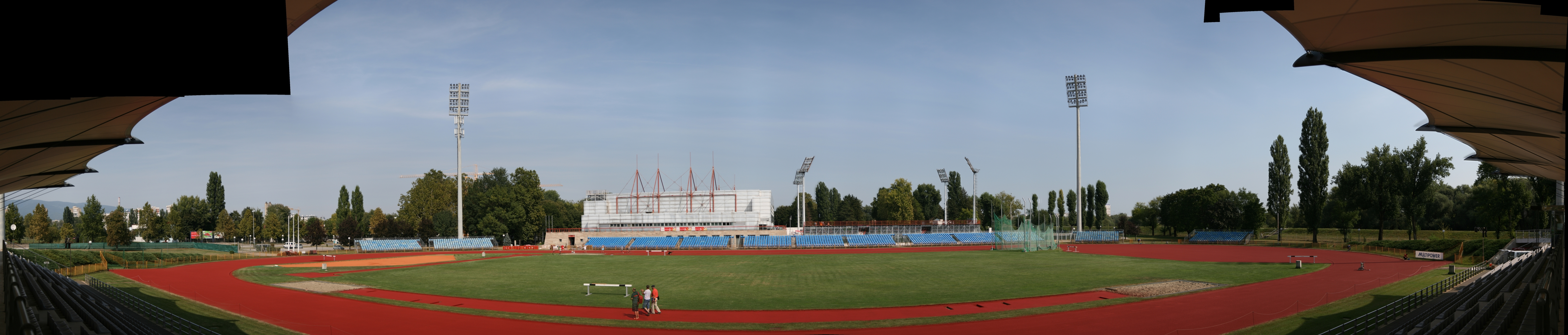
- The host stadium – Sports park Mladost
- Date: June–September
- Location: Zagreb, Croatia
- Event type: Track and field
- Established: 1951
- Website: zagreb-meeting.com?lang=en

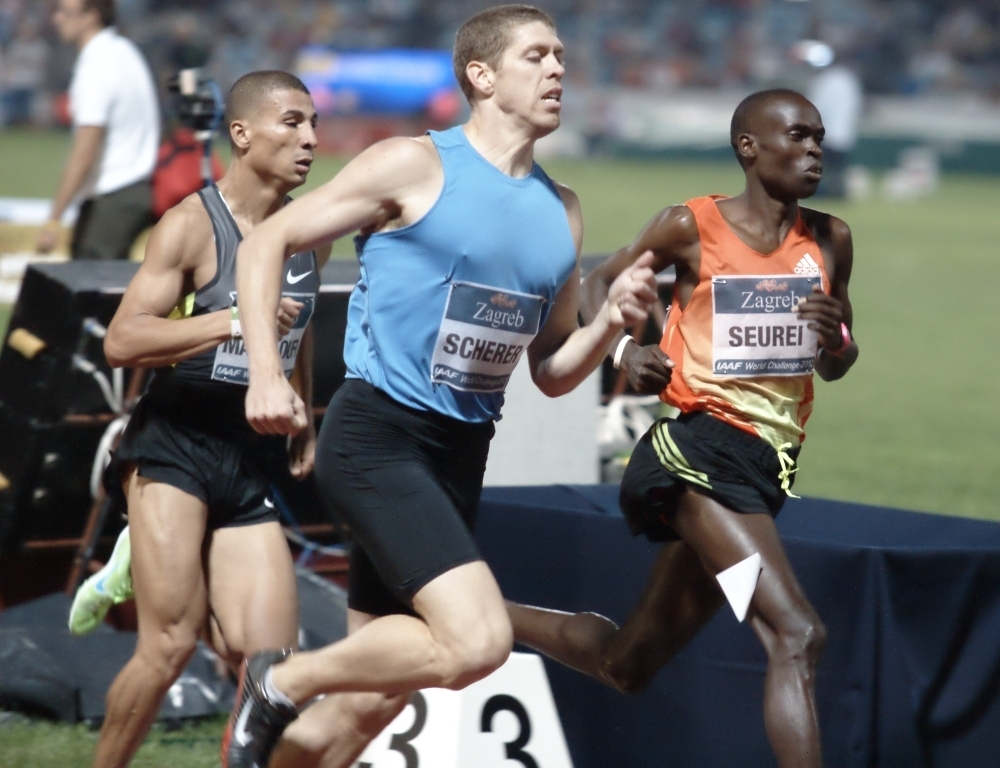
1500 m race in 2012

Hanžeković Memorial (Croatian: Hanžekovićev memorijal), known also as Zagreb Meeting and Hanžek (hypocorism of the surname Hanžeković), is an annual three-day athletics event held first weekend of September at three different locations in Zagreb, Croatia as part of the IAAF World Challenge Meetings. It was first organized in 1951. Long jump and pole vault competition Zagreb CIty Challenge is held at the Ban Jelačić Square, shot put Ivan Ivančić Memorial in front of the National and University Library and all other competitions at the Sports park Mladost athletic stadium.

Hanžek (which is the popular name of meeting) was first held in 1951 as a local level meeting. Seven years later, in 1958, it became an international competition. From 2000 to 2009 the IAAF classified the Hanžeković Memorial among IAAF Grand Prix meetings and it gained IAAF World Challenge meeting status upon the inauguration of that series in 2010.

The meeting was named in memory of the renowned Zagreb runner Boris Hanžeković who was killed by the fascists during World War II in Yugoslavia.

Sandra Perković won the Memorial a record 11 times.

== Meeting records ==
=== Men ===
Men's meeting records of the Hanžeković Memorial
Event	Record	Athlete	Nationality	Date	Ref.
100 m	9.85 (+0.1 m/s)	Usain Bolt	Jamaica	13 September 2011	
200 m	19.88 (−0.4 m/s)	Ramil Guliyev	Turkey	8 September 2015	
400 m	44.46	Kirani James	Grenada	14 September 2021	
800 m	1:44.08	Nijel Amos	Botswana	4 September 2018	
1000 m	2:13.13	Marco Arop	Canada	8 September 2024	
1500 m	3:30.94	Nixon Kiplimo Chepseba	Kenya	13 September 2011	
Mile	3:50.68	Noureddine Morceli	Algeria	7 Juli 1998	
2000 m	4:54.29	Isaac Kimeli	Belgium	8 September 2024	
3000 m	7:33.95	Dominic Lokinyomo Lobalu	South Sudan	10 September 2023	
5000 m	13:03.17	Denis Kipkoech	Kenya	24 May 2025	
110 m hurdles	12.98 (+0.6 m/s)	Mark Crear	United States	5 July 1999	
110 m hurdles	12.98 (+1.2 m/s)	Jamal Britt	United States	26 June 2026	
400 m hurdles	48.24	Kemel Thompson	Jamaica	7 July 2003	
2000 m steeplechase	5:14.06	Soufiane El Bakkali	Morocco	11 September 2022	
3000 m steeplechase	8:06.33	Leonard Kipkemoi Bett	Kenya	8 September 2024	
High jump	2.34 m	Kwaku Boateng	Canada	3 July 2000	
Pole vault	5.88 m	Emmanouil Karalis	Greece	8 September 2024	
Long jump	8.46 m (−0.3 m/s)	Luvo Manyonga	South Africa	4 September 2018	
Triple jump	17.16 m (+0.3 m/s)	Onochie Achike	Great Britain	3 July 2000	
Shot put	22.93 m	Ryan Crouser	United States	7 September 2024	
Discus throw	72.34 m	Kristjan Čeh	Slovenia	24 May 2025	
Hammer throw	81.91 m	Yann Chaussinand	France	24 May 2025	
Javelin throw	86.36 m	Tero Pitkämäki	Finland	3 September 2013	

=== Women ===
Women's meeting records of the Hanžeković Memorial
Event	Record	Athlete	Nationality	Date	Ref.
100 m	10.91 (+0.9 m/s)	Elaine Thompson-Herah	Jamaica	26 June 2026	
200 m	22.04 (+0.3 m/s)	Christine Mboma	Namibia	14 September 2021	
400 m	49.48	Stacey-Ann Williams	Jamaica	26 June 2026	
800 m	1:57.00	Nelly Chepchirchir	Kenya	8 September 2024	
1000 m	2:36.33	Jolanda Čeplak	Slovenia	11 July 2005	
1500 m	3:58.14	Gudaf Tsegay	Ethiopia	24 May 2025	
Mile	4:21.10	Linden Hall	Australia	11 September 2022	
2000 m	5:21.56	Francine Niyonsaba	Burundi	14 September 2021	
3000 m	8:33.37	Lilian Rengeruk	Kenya	4 September 2018	
100 m hurdles	12.43 (−0.2 m/s)	Alaysha Johnson	United States	26 June 2026	
400 m hurdles	53.54	Rushell Clayton	Jamaica	26 June 2026	
2000 m steeplechase	5:47.42	Beatrice Chepkoech	Kenya	10 September 2023	
3000 m steeplechase	9:04.56	Norah Jeruto	Kenya	29 August 2017	
High jump	2.08 m	Blanka Vlašić	Croatia	31 August 2009	
Pole vault	4.61 m	Tina Sutej	Slovenia	9 September 2022	
Long jump	6.96 m (+1.1 m/s)	Ivana Španović	Serbia	6 September 2016	
Triple jump	15.25 m (+1.8 m/s)	Thea LaFond	Dominica	26 June 2026	
Shot put	20.33 m	Astrid Kumbernuss	Germany	22 June 1995	
Discus throw	70.83 m	Sandra Perković	Croatia	29 August 2017	
Hammer throw	76.62 m	Yipsi Moreno	Cuba	9 September 2008	
Javelin throw	66.42 m	Sara Kolak	Croatia	3 September 2019	
