= Požega, Croatia =

Požega
- City
- Grad Požega; City of Požega
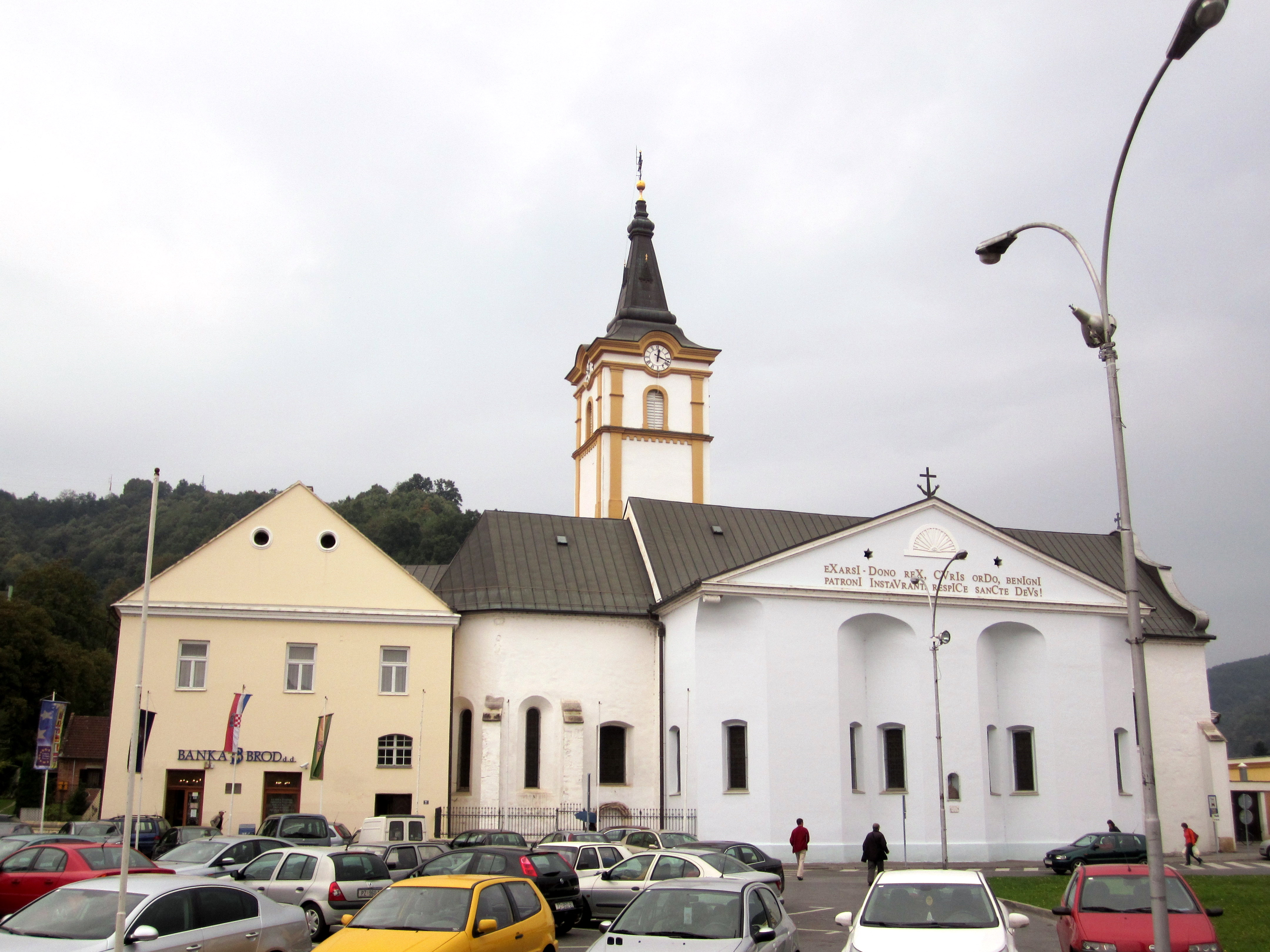
- Church of Holy Ghost

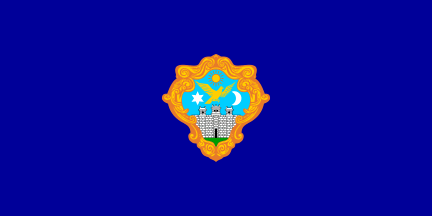
- Flag
- Interactive map of Požega
- Country: Croatia
- Region: Slavonia (Požega Valley)
- County: Požega-Slavonia County
- Founded: 12th century

Government
  - Mayor: Borislav Miličević (HDZ)

Area
  - City: 133.8 km^{2} (51.7 sq mi)
  - Urban: 24.6 km^{2} (9.5 sq mi)
- Elevation: 311 m (1,020 ft)

Population (2021)
  - City: 22,294
  - Density: 166.6/km^{2} (431.5/sq mi)
  - Urban: 16,867
  - Urban density: 686/km^{2} (1,780/sq mi)
- Time zone: UTC+1 (CET)
  - Summer (DST): UTC+2 (CEST)
- Postal code: HR-34 000
- Area code: +385 34
- Vehicle registration: PŽ
- Website: pozega.hr

Požega (pronounced [pôʒeɡa]) is a city in western Slavonia, eastern Croatia, with a total population of 22,364 (census 2021). It is the administrative center of the Požega-Slavonia County.

== Name ==
Between 1921 and 1991, the town was known as Slavonska Požega. In German, the town is known as Poschegg, in Hungarian as Pozsega, in Turkish as Pojega, and in Latin as Incerum (-i, n.) and Possega. There is a town in Serbia with same name (see: Požega, Serbia). "Požega" is supposed to be related to the Croatian word "požar", meaning "forest fire". "Incerum" is supposed to come from Proto-Indo-European words *h1eyn (valley) and *kjer (heart), so that it means "the heart of the valley".

== Geography ==
Požega (elevation: 152 m (499 ft)) is located in the south-western part of the Valley of Požega, or Požega basin, in Croatian: Požeška kotlina. This fertile valley has been important since the antiquity - its Roman name was Vallis Aurea, meaning "golden valley".

The valley is formed by the Slavonian mountains of Požeška Gora, Psunj, Papuk, Krndija and Dilj.

Two state roads run concurrently through the city: the D38 Pakrac — Požega — Pleternica — Đakovo and the D51 Nova Gradiška — Požega — Našice, as well as a railroad: Nova Kapela/Batrina — Pleternica — Požega — Velika.

== Climate ==
Since records began in 1949, the highest temperature recorded at the local weather station was 40.0 °C (104.0 °F), on 6 August 2012. The coldest temperature was −27.6 °C (−17.7 °F), on 16 January 1963.

== Demographics ==
The total population of the city administrative area is 22,364 according 2021 census. Population decreased 14.79 per cent from 26,248 in 2011, when constituent settlements had this population:

- Alaginci, population 198
- Bankovci, population 109
- Crkveni Vrhovci, population 30
- Ćosine Laze, population 27
- Dervišaga, population 890
- Donji Emovci, population 181
- Drškovci, population 411
- Emovački Lug, population 32
- Golobrdci, population 332
- Gornji Emovci, population 138
- Gradski Vrhovci, population 46
- Komušina, population 82
- Krivaj, population 79
- Kunovci, population 88
- Laze Prnjavor, population 10
- Marindvor, population 116
- Mihaljevci, population 752
- Nova Lipa, population 88
- Novi Mihaljevci, population 291
- Novi Štitnjak, population 136
- Novo Selo, population 432
- Požega, population 19,506
- Seoci, population 108
- Stara Lipa, population 213
- Šeovci, population 121
- Škrabutnik, population 22
- Štitnjak, population 54
- Turnić, population 88
- Ugarci, population 57
- Vasine Laze, population 29
- Vidovci, population 1,582

By ethnicity, the population is 93.24% Croats, 4.66% Serbs, 0.56% undeclared, 0.38% Albanians, 0.15% Czechs, and others.

City of Požega: Population trends 1857–2021
v

population	5191	6139	6310	7871	9437	11020	12054	12393	13715	15450	19508	24939	26708	28157	28201	26248	22294
	1857	1869	1880	1890	1900	1910	1921	1931	1948	1953	1961	1971	1981	1991	2001	2011	2021

Sources: Croatian Bureau of Statistics publications

== Politics ==
=== Minority councils ===
Directly elected minority councils and representatives are tasked with consulting tasks for the local or regional authorities in which they are advocating for minority rights and interests, integration into public life and participation in the management of local affairs. At the 2023 Croatian national minorities councils and representatives elections Serbs of Croatia fulfilled legal requirements to elect 15 members minority council of the Town of Požega.

== History ==
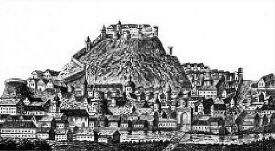
Fortress and city of Požega (early 18th century)

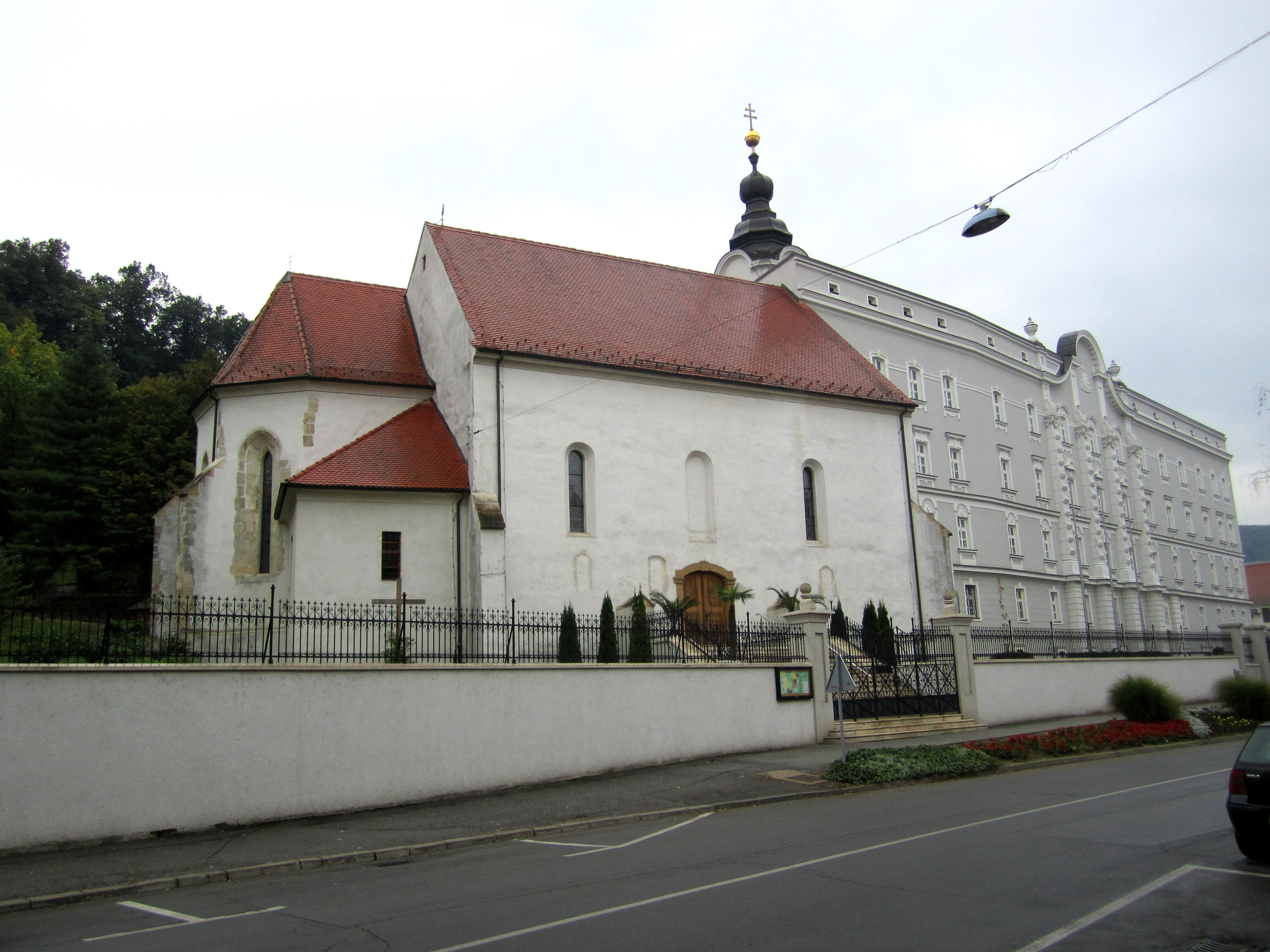
Bishop's Palace

The first mention of the city of Požega is found in the Gesta Hungarorum, by an anonymous notary of Béla III (1172–1196) where he mentions the conquest of three forts in Slavonia - as the area between rivers Danube and Sutla was then called: Zagreb, Vlco (Vukovar) and Posega. The fortress of Požega, an elongated hexagonal fortification located on a hill in the present-day city center, was probably built during the 11th century, although the first documents that clearly mention Požega county date from 1210, while the city of Požega was documented for the first time in a charter of Andrew II on January 11, 1227.

Požega was originally the residential estate of the Croatian-Hungarian queen and was exempt from the authority of the viceroy and the county. Although no such charter survives, the privileges that citizens enjoyed fully corresponded to a free royal city.

The fortress doesn't exist anymore, and the irregularly-shaped central city square is Romanic in nature. Only fragments of walls remain to remind that there once stood a fortress. The remaining monuments from that age are the Church of St. Lawrence (first mentioned in 1303), and the Church of the Holy Spirit (built in 1235).

By the late 14th century, the city started to decline economically due to insecurity from Ottoman raids. In the 15th century, city walls were built, replacing a moat that existed before. This proved an insufficient defense as the Turks seized Požega in 1537.

During the 150-year-long Ottoman rule, Požega was seat of a Sanjak of Požega and given certain prominence. After a considerable economic decline, in 1537, at the time of the Ottoman conquest, Požega reportedly had 110 houses and 15 businesses. However, by 1579, there were 160 craftsmen in Požega as a result of improved security and an increase in population.

The death of Hasan Predojević the Požega Sanjak Bey in the Battle of Sisak in 1593, marked the first Ottoman defeat in Europe, and after years of steady decline, Ottoman rule grew weaker until Požega was finally liberated on 12 March 1688 by citizens led by friar Luka Ibrišimović. This day is now celebrated as the day of the city. However, Ottomans retook Požega in 1690 and held it for a year.

After the liberation in 1691, Požega came under Habsburg rule, and in 1745, Požega county was restored and the city thus returned to the authority of Croatian viceroy. Požega underwent a period of vigorous development: In 1699, a grammar school opened - only the fifth in Croatia. In 1727, Jesuits built a theatre, and in 1740, the city's first pharmacy. Today the city theater (Požega City Theater) is located on Square of the Holy Trinity (Trg Svetog Trojstva). There used to be also a philosophical college for Franciscan novices - the first such institution in Slavonia since the Ottoman rule. Finally, the Academia Posegana opened in 1760, placing Požega, along with Zagreb, among the first Croatian centres of highest education.

In 1765, Empress Maria Theresa granted Požega a royal free city charter and supported the construction of the present-day Cathedral of St.Teresa of Ávila.

In 1847, Požega was the first city in Croatia to introduce the Croatian language in official use, and the achievements of its notable citizens earned it the nickname of "Slavonian Athens".

In the late 19th century and early 20th century, Požega was the seat of the Požega County of the Kingdom of Croatia-Slavonia.

From 1941 to 1945, Požega was part of the Independent State of Croatia. During this period war crimes were committed against the Serb and Jewish population, allegedly under former police chief Milivoj Ašner. The DVD Zvečevo of Požega was founded in 1942.

On October 29, 1991, during the Croatian War of Independence, 26 predominantly Serb villages in Požega were targeted by Croatian forces. It is estimated that 44 Serbs were killed, thousands displaced and over 1,000 buildings and homes destroyed in the operation.

Požega County was abolished along with other Croatian counties in 1923, and was restored in 1993, following the independence of Croatia. Furthermore, in the footsteps of its tradition as an educational center as well as a church center, Požega became a diocesan see in 1997, and a graduate-degree college was opened in 1998.

== Economy ==
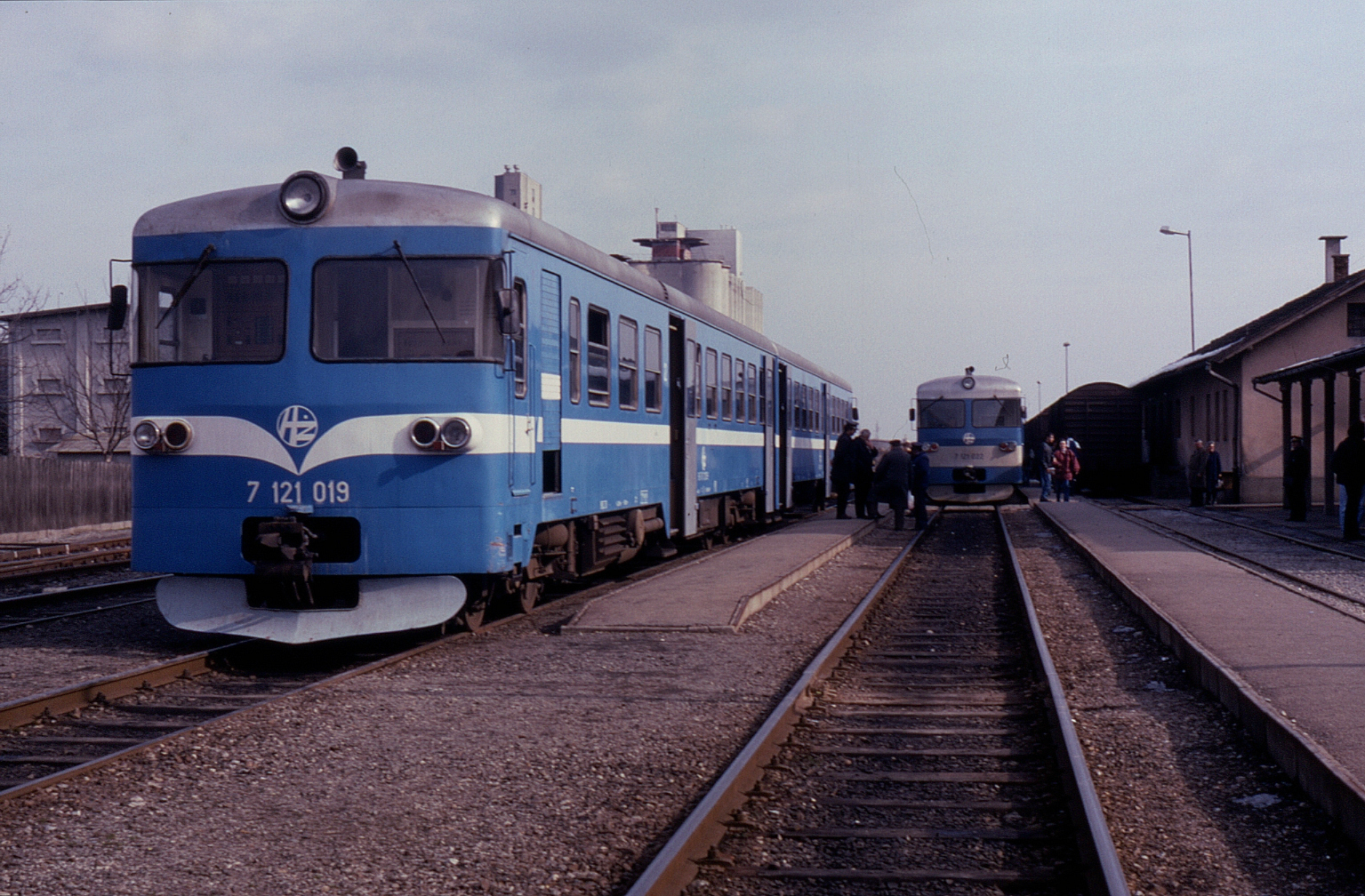
Požega railway station in 1997

Chief occupations include farming, viticulture, livestock breeding, metal-processing (foundry, machines and tractors, household appliances), foodstuffs (chocolate, sweets and drinks), textiles (ready-made), wood and timber, building material (bricks, roof tiles) and printing industries.

== Festivities and events ==
The city has an 800-year-old cultural and historical heritage. Its traditions underlie the tourist development of Požega.

The central town square with a number of buildings (the church of the Holy Spirit, the Franciscan monastery, the Town House, etc.) and a plague column is considered one of the most beautiful squares in Croatia.

Požega hosts a number of traditional cultural events and performances. Grgurevo or St. Gregory's Day is a traditional show of canons and mortars, exhibited on the central square (12 March). The event includes the mortar fire in Požega vineyards, which symbolizes the chasing of the Ottomans from the region and commemorates the victory over the Turks on Sokolovac Hill in 1688. The Croatian Minute Movie Cup — an international festival featuring one-minute-long movies — and the national dog show are held in May The events in June are St. John's Bonfire (21 June), Kulenijada — a special event dedicated to presentation and tasting of the very best kulen (Slavonian paprika-flavoured sausages), served with quality local wines.

The events in September are Fišijada (fishing and preparing of Slavonian-style fish specialities) and the important music festival Golden Strings of Slavonia (first weekend in September). This event is a contest of folk music performers and singers but also includes other events (grape harvest, beauty contest, the most "swaggering" peasant girl, national costumes show, etc.). Organ music evenings are organized on the occasion of the town's day and in commemoration of its patroness, St. Teresa of Avila (15 October). There is a quiz contest each April, "Spring Open Vallis Aurea" (SOVA), organized by the Quiz lover's club. SOVA arouse from Pub quiz, a popular event that is usually organized on Fridays bi-weekly, and become probably the largest independent quiz contest in the country.

== Education ==
There are three primary schools and seven secondary schools in Požega.

The Gymnasium in Požega was founded in 1699 and it is one of Croatia's oldest educational institutions. From 1761 to 1776 it was part of the high schools listed under the name of Academia Posegana, and had two faculties – the Faculty of Philosophy and the Faculty of Theology.

Today the Gymnasium is an independent high school which carries out general and natural sciences-mathematics syllabus and curriculum.

== Sports and recreation ==
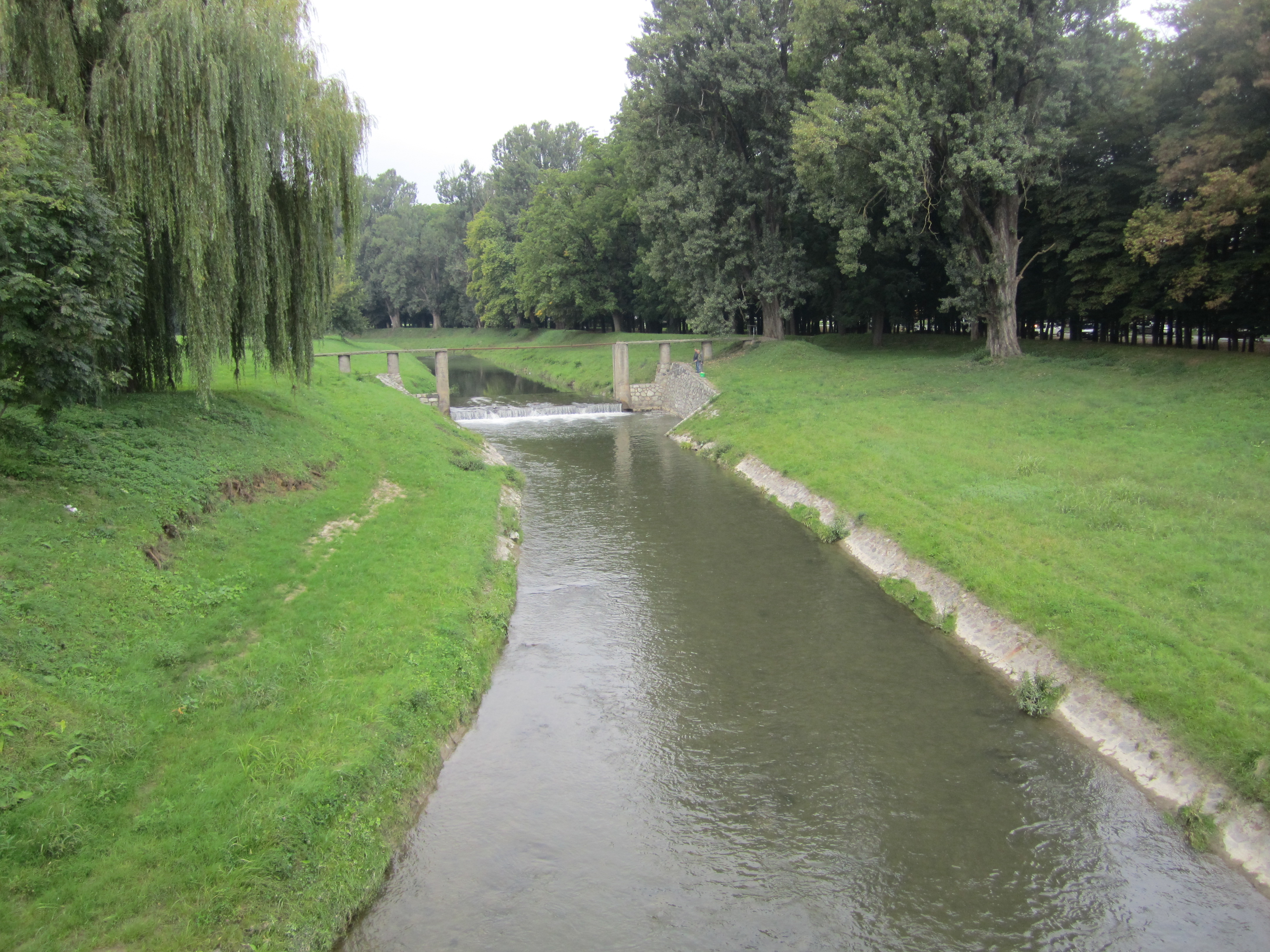
Orljava river

Internationally, the most important sporting event in Požega is the annual international judo tournament held in October, organized by the local Judokan judo club.

Among other significant sporting events in Požega, in May there is a motocross race as a part of the Croatian championship, in June there is car race held on Glavica race track, and in September there is a basketball tournament.

The sports hall Grabrik, the Orljava river and the surrounding hills are the major sports and recreational areas of Požega. Angling opportunities are provided on the Orljava and Veličanka rivers, and there is also small game hunting in the lowlands and high game in the nearby hills. Traditional Slavonian specialities and wines are offered throughout the region.

The local chapter of the HPS is HPD "Sokolovac", which had 106 members in 1936 under the Julije Strepački presidency. Membership fell to 97 in 1937, and to 96 in 1938 under the Antun Mihelčić presidency.

On 17 May 2013 the first ever professional boxing event was held in Grabrik sports hall with Mark de Mori fighting Adnan Buharalija for the WBU Heavyweight World title. de Mori, whose wife Milijana Vojnovic is from Pozega, won the bout in the 5th round when Buharalija retired in his corner. The event was promoted by Pozegans Nail Mahmutović and Tomislav Jakobovic.

The NK Slavonija Požega is the major football club who play in the third tier of the Croatian football pyramid.

== Notable people ==
- Luka Ibrišimović (1626–1698), friar and military commander in the Ottoman wars
- Antun Kanižlić (1699–1777), writer, among the first "Slavonian spiritual rebirth" authors
- Julije Kempf (1864–1934), historian, writer, teacher, founder of the City Museum
- Miroslav Kraljević (1885–1913), born in Gospić, family originally from Požega area, painter, among the founders of Croatian modern painting, created his most important works in Požega
- Friedrich Salomon Krauss (1859–1938), sexologist, ethnographer, folklorist, and Slavist
- Dragutin Lerman (1863–1918), writer, African explorer, East Congo commissioner
- Ante Šercer (1896–1968), physician, academician
- Andrija Štampar (1888–1958), physician, founder of School of Public Health in Zagreb
- Armin Pavić (1844–1914), literary historian
- Mia Oremović (1918-2010), actress
- Stjepan Mesić (born 1934), born in Orahovica, attended Požega gymnasium, President of Croatia (2000–2010)
- Marko Kopljar (born 1986), handball player
- Predrag Stojaković (born 1977), Serbian NBA basketball player
- Vesna Pisarović (born 1978), singer
- Dino Jelusić, singer, winner of the Junior Eurovision Song Contest 2003
- Ivana Kindl (born 1978), singer
- Boris Hanžeković, (1916-1945), athlete
- Matej Mitrović (born 1993), footballer, member of the Croatia national football team
- Zlatko Bourek (1929-2018), Croatian Jewish film director
- Predrag Matić (born 1962), Member of European Parliament
- Vjekoslav Babukić (1812-1875), linguist, translator, revivalist
- Dobriša Cesarić (1902-1980), poet, translator
- Tvrtko Jakovina (born 1972), historian
- Dejana Milosavljević (born 1994), Croatian handball player
- Dino Jelusić (born 1992), rocksinger
- Leo Mikić (born 1997), Croatian footballer

== International relations ==
Požega is twinned with:

- Yokneam, Israel and
- Gornji Milanovac, Serbia.

== See also ==
- Požgaj
