= Ugarci, Trebinje =

Ugarci Угарци
- Village
- Location within Bosnia and Herzegovina
- Coordinates: 42°49′01″N 18°18′26″E
- Country: Bosnia and Herzegovina
- Entity: Republika Srpska
- Municipality: Trebinje
- Time zone: UTC+1 (CET)
  - Summer (DST): UTC+2 (CEST)

Ugarci (Serbian Cyrillic: Угарци) is a village in the municipality of Trebinje, Republika Srpska, Bosnia and Herzegovina.
