= Boris Hanžeković =

Boris Hanžeković (10 October 1916 – 22 April 1945) was a Croatian track and field athlete from the interwar period. The Hanžeković Memorial is named after him.

Hanžeković was the junior state champion in 100 and 200-meter races multiple times, in the 110 m hurdles and in both 4 x 100 metres relay and 4 x 400 metres relay. He ran for HŠK Concordia.

During World War II in Yugoslavia, Hanžeković refused to run for the Independent State of Croatia (NDH). Charged with associating with the Partisans, he was imprisoned in the Jasenovac concentration camp where he was killed in an inmate breakout on 22 April 1945.

In his honour, a 110 metres hurdles race held in Zagreb since 1952 became known as the "Boris Hanžeković memorial race" (Memorijalna utrka Borisa Hanžekovića).
