= Požega-Slavonia County =

County in Croatia

Coordinates: 45.311°N 17.740°E

Požega-Slavonia County Požeško-slavonska županija (Croatian)
- County
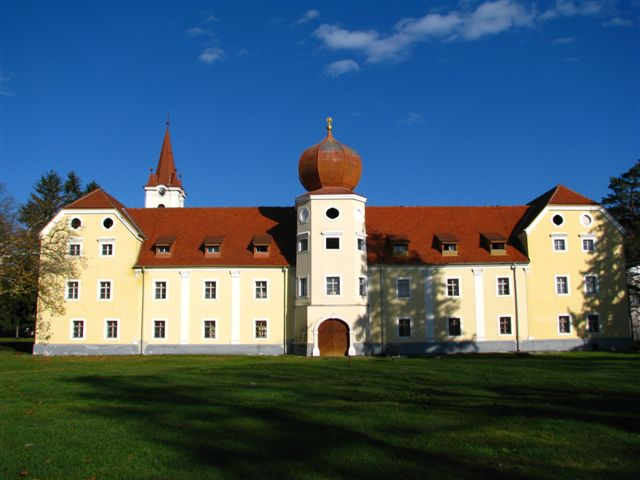
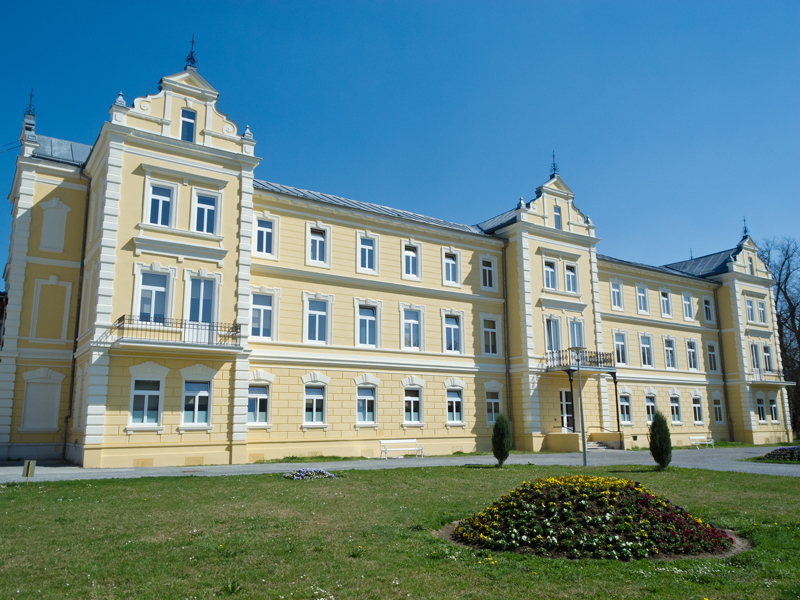
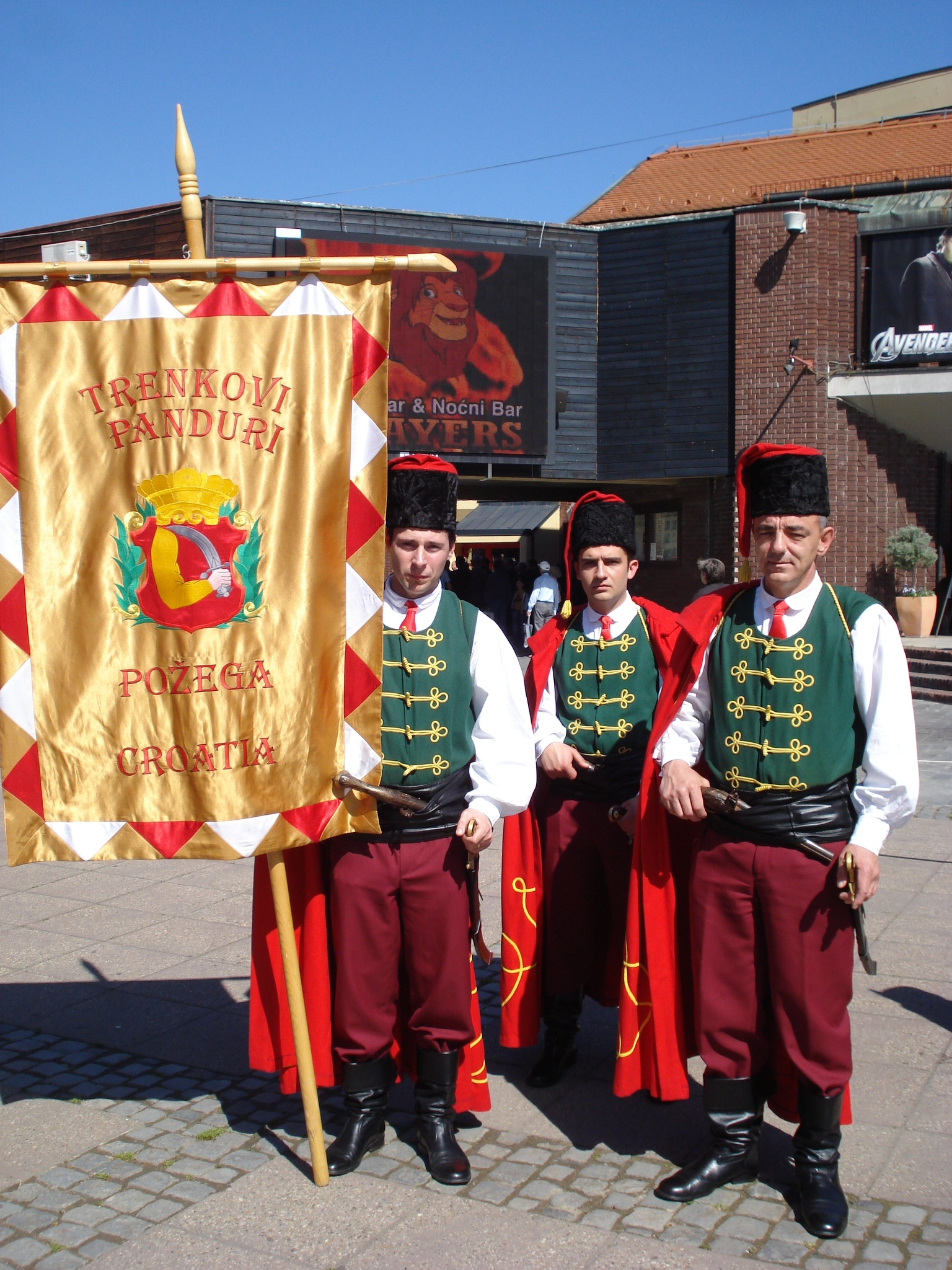
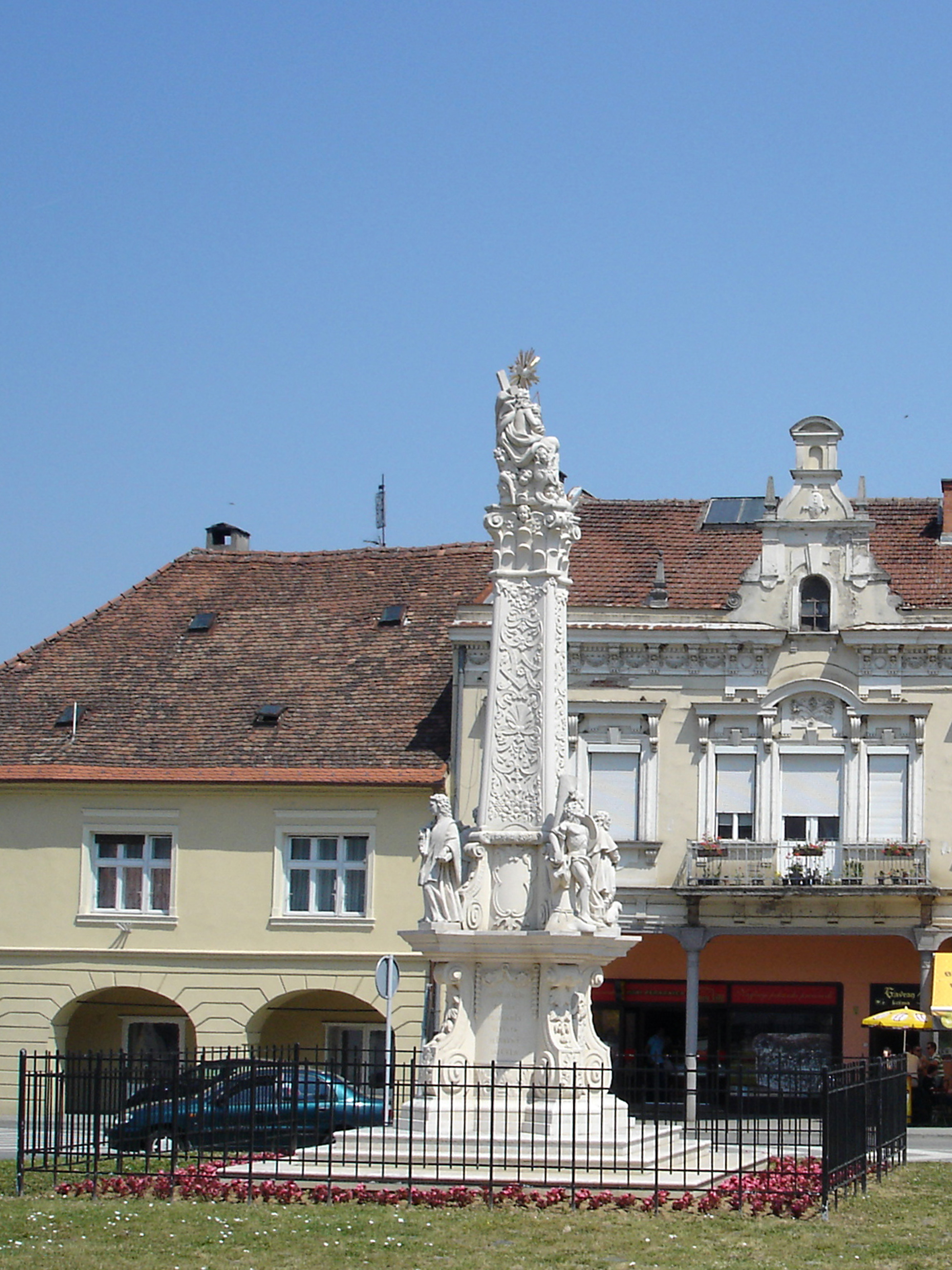
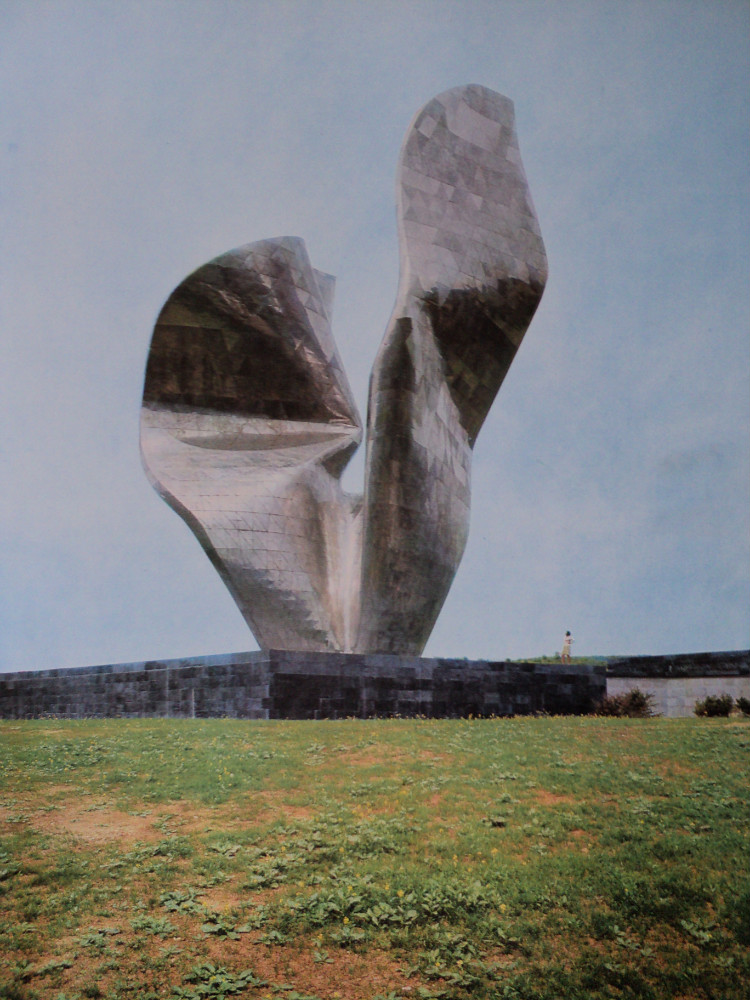
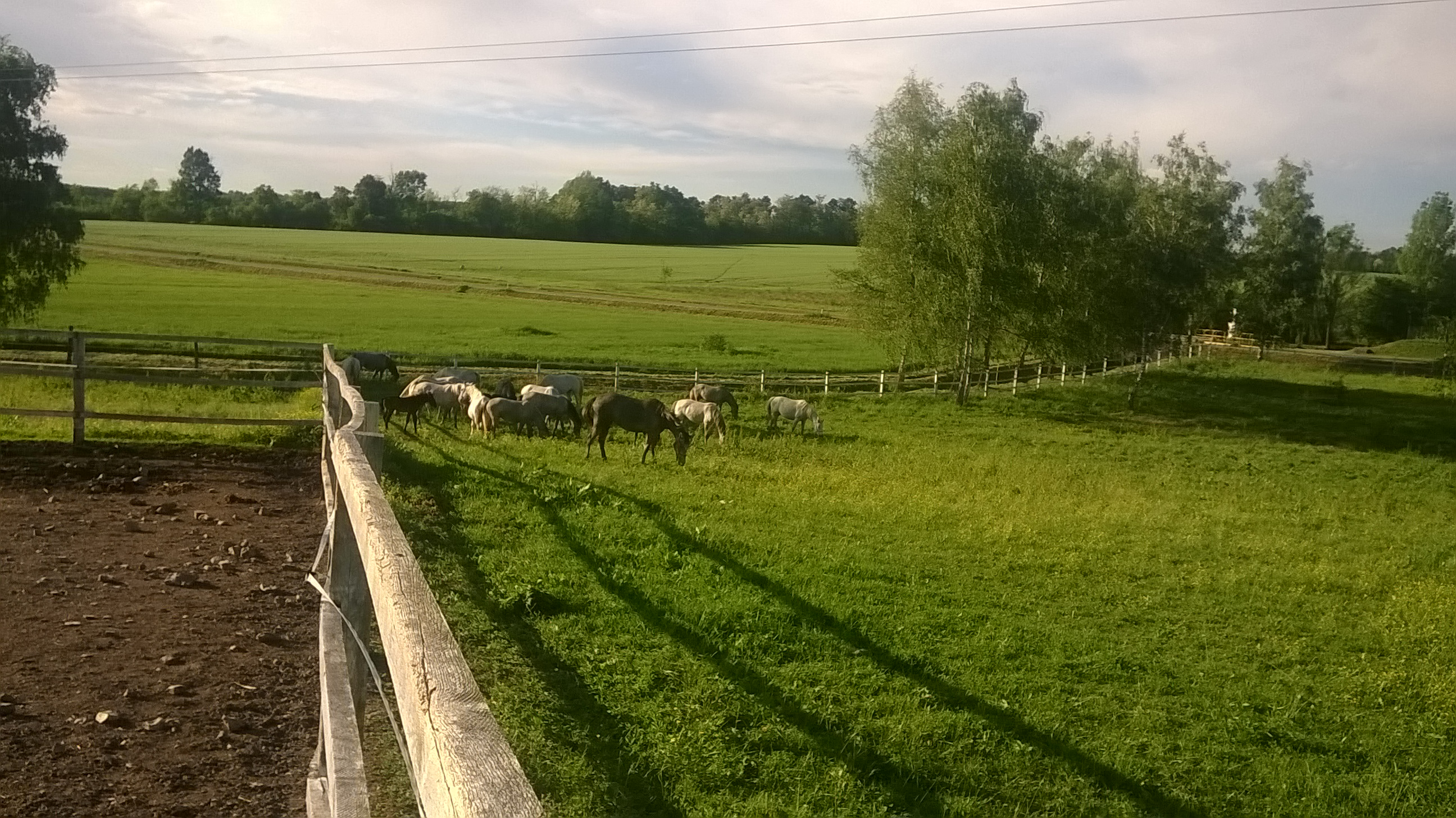
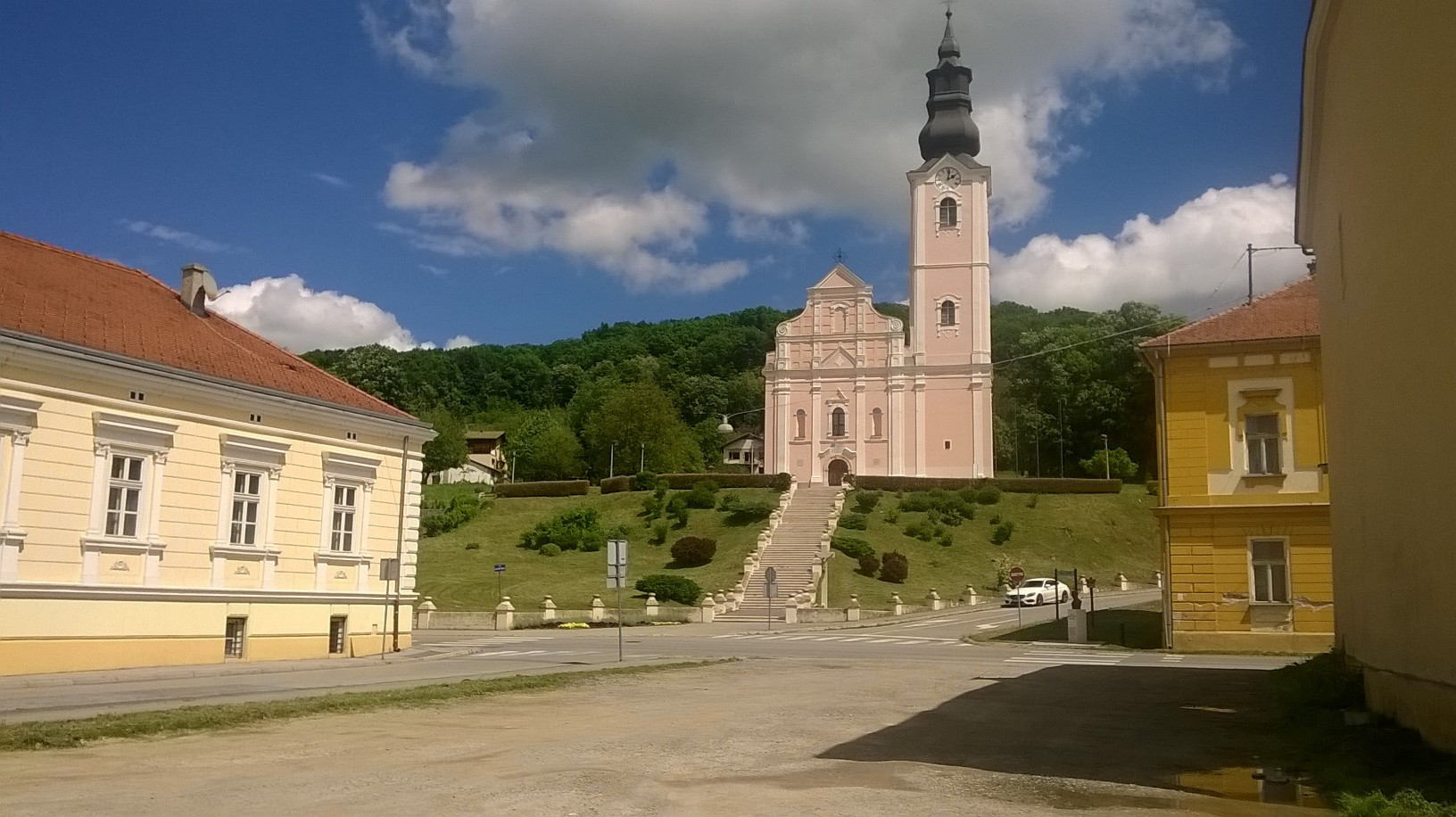
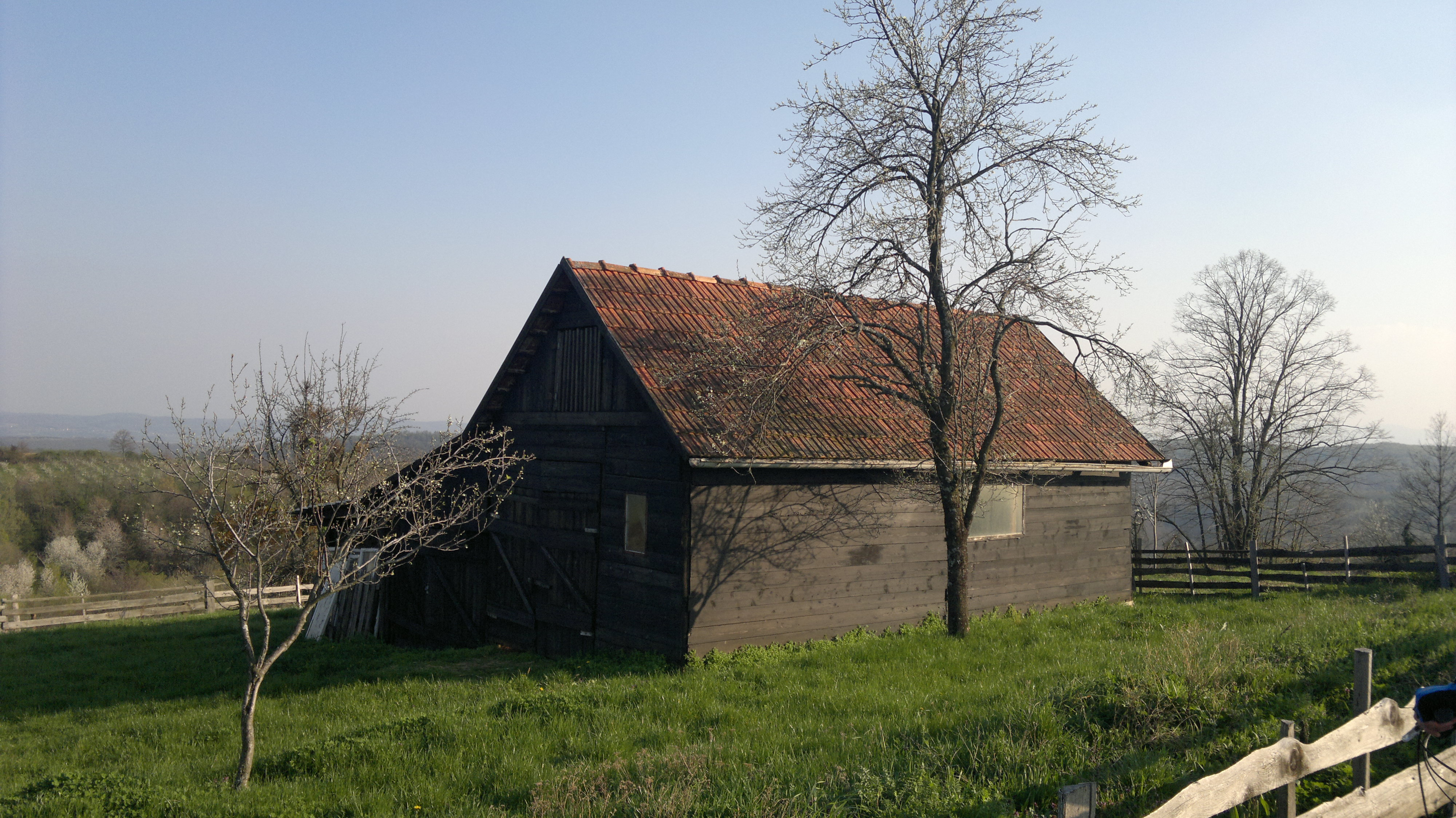
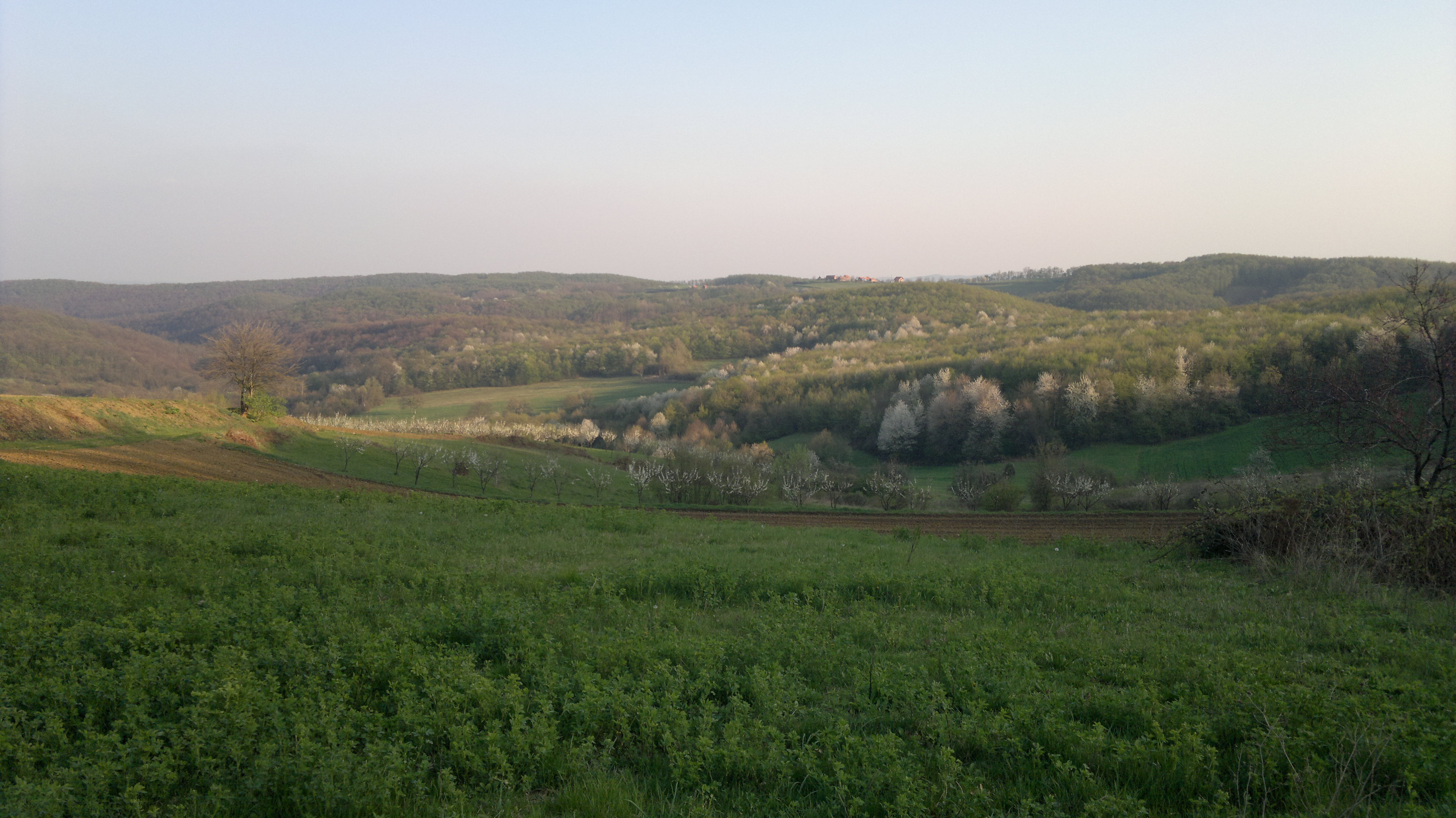

- Flag Coat of arms

- Požega-Slavonia County within Croatia
- Country: Croatia
- County seat: Požega

Government
  - Župan (Prefect): Antonija Jozić (HDZ)

Area
  - Total: 1,823 km^{2} (704 sq mi)

Population (2021)
  - Total: 64,420
  - Density: 35.34/km^{2} (91.52/sq mi)
- Area code: 034
- ISO 3166 code: HR-11
- HDI (2022): 0.825 very high · 20th
- Website: www.pszupanija.hr

Požega-Slavonia County (Croatian: Požeško-slavonska županija [pôʒeʃko-slǎʋoːnskaː ʒupǎnija]) is a Croatian county in western Slavonia. Its capital is Požega. Its population was 78,034 at the 2011 census.

Alongside the City of Zagreb and Bjelovar-Bilogora County, it is one of three Croatian counties that do not border another nation.

== Geography ==
Požega-Slavonia county borders on Bjelovar-Bilogora County in the northwest, Virovitica-Podravina County in the north, Osijek-Baranja County in the northeast, Brod-Posavina County in the south, and Sisak-Moslavina County in the southwest.

== Administrative divisions ==
Požega-Slavonija County is divided into:

- City of Požega (county seat)
- Town of Lipik
- Town of Pakrac
- Town of Kutjevo
- Town of Pleternica
- Municipalities:

Municipality	Area (km^{2})	Population (2011 census)	Settlements
Brestovac	279.53	3,726	Amatovci • Bogdašić • Bolomače • Boričevci • Brestovac • Busnovi • Crljenci • Čečavac • Čečavački Vučjak • Daranovci • Deževci • Dolac • Donji Gučani • Gornji Gučani • Ivandol • Jaguplije • Jeminovac • Kamenska • Kamenski Šeovci • Kamenski Vučjak • Koprivna • Kruševo • Kujnik • Mihajlije • Mijači • Mrkoplje • Novo Zvečevo • Nurkovac • Oblakovac • Orljavac • Pasikovci • Pavlovci • Perenci • Podsreće • Požeški Brđani • Rasna • Ruševac • Sažije • Skenderovci • Sloboština • Striježevica • Šnjegavić • Šušnjari • Vilić Selo • Vranić • Zakorenje • Završje • Žigerovci
Kaptol	90	3,472	Alilovci • Bešinci • Češljakovci • Doljanovci • Golo Brdo • Kaptol • Komarovci • Novi Bešinci • Podgorje • Ramanovci
Čaglin	179	2,723	Čaglin • Darkovac • Djedina Rijeka • Dobra Voda • Dobrogošće • Draganlug • Duboka • Imrijevci • Ivanovci • Jasik • Jezero • Jurkovac • Kneževac • Latinovac • Migalovci • Milanlug • Mokreš • Nova Lipovica • Nova Ljeskovica • Novi Zdenkovac • Paka • Ruševo • Sapna • Sibokovac • Sovski Dol • Stara Ljeskovica • Stari Zdenkovac • Stojčinovac • Veliki Bilač • Vlatkovac • Vukojevica
Velika	154	5,607	Antunovac • Biškupci • Bratuljevci • Doljanci • Draga • Gornji Vrhovci • Kantrovci • Klisa • Lučinci • Markovac • Milanovac • Milivojevci • Nježić • Oljasi • Ozdakovci • Poljanska • Potočani • Radovanci • Smoljanovci • Stražeman • Toranj • Trenkovo • Trnovac • Velika
Jakšić	43.70	4,058	Bertelovci • Cerovac • Eminovci • Granje • Jakšić • Radnovac • Rajsavac • Svetinja • Tekić • Treštanovci

== Demographics ==
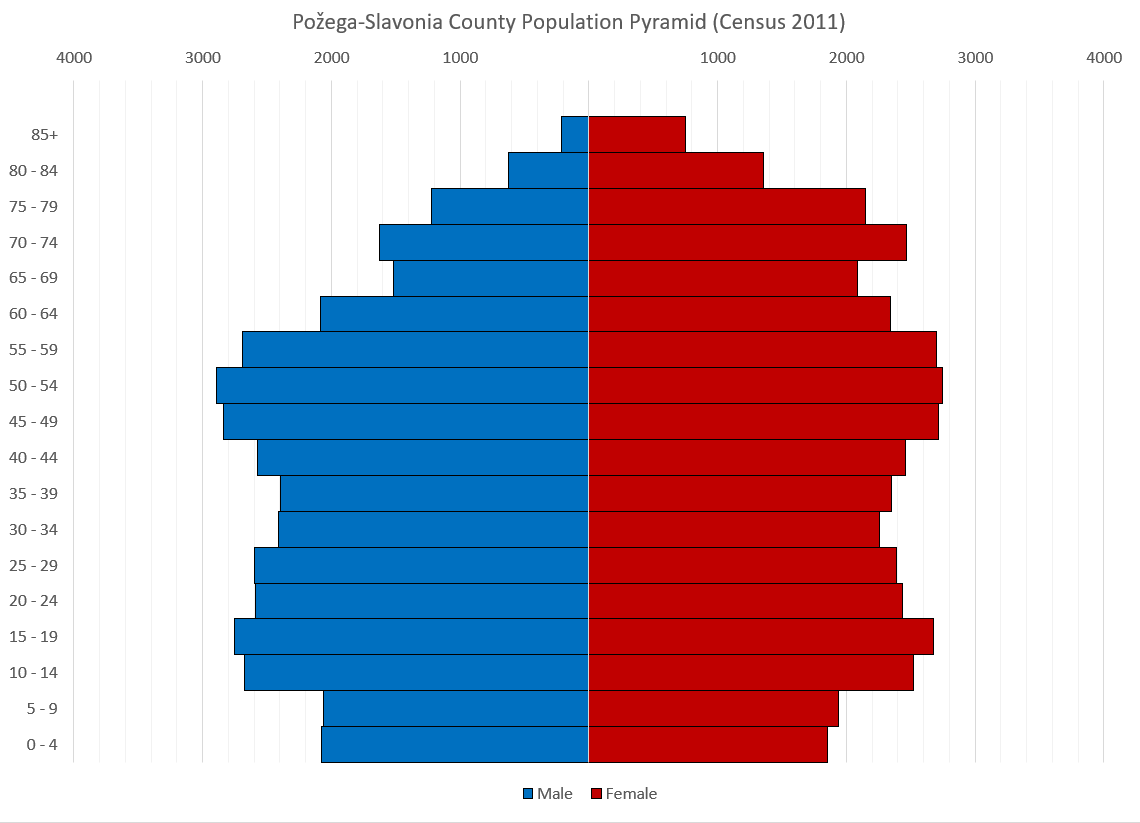
Population pyramid of Požega-Slavonia County per 2011 Census.

Historical populations of Požega-Slavonia County

Year	Pop.	±%
1857	47,877	—
1869	53,532	+11.8%
1880	54,183	+1.2%
1890	68,101	+25.7%
1900	79,141	+16.2%
1910	91,272	+15.3%
1921	91,076	−0.2%
1931	99,657	+9.4%
1948	89,646	−10.0%

Year	Pop.	±%
1953	94,761	+5.7%
1961	99,340	+4.8%
1971	101,745	+2.4%
1981	99,096	−2.6%
1991	99,334	+0.2%
2001	85,831	−13.6%
2011	78,034	−9.1%
2021	64,420	−17.4%

Source: Naselja i stanovništvo Republike Hrvatske 1857–2001, Croatian Bureau of Statistics, Zagreb, 2005

As of the 2021 census, the county had 64,420 residents. The population density is 35 people per km^{2}.

Požega-Slavonia County: Population trends 1857–2021
v

population	47877	53532	54183	68101	79141	91272	91076	99657	89646	94761	99340	101745	99096	99334	85831	78034	64420
	1857	1869	1880	1890	1900	1910	1921	1931	1948	1953	1961	1971	1981	1991	2001	2011	2021

Sources: Croatian Bureau of Statistics publications

Ethnic Croats form the majority with 90.4% of the population, followed by Serbs at 6.0%.

== Politics ==
=== County Assembly ===
Following the 2025 Croatian local elections the Assembly of the Požega-Slavonia County was composed of 31 elected representatives. Out of a total of 59,998 eligible voters 24,624 (41.04%) participated in the elections and 24,620 (41.03%) submitted their ballots. There were 23,508 (95.48%) valid and 1,112 (4.52%) invalid ballots.

The Croatian Democratic Union in coalition with Croatian Party of Pensioners got 12,631 (53.73%) ballots and 18 elected representatives. The Social Democratic Party of Croatia in coalition with Croatian Peasant Party got 6,276 ballots (26.69%) and 9 elected representatives. Homeland Movement got 1,715 ballots (7.29%) and 2 elected representatives. Coalition of Home and National Rally, Croatian Sovereignists, Croatian Party of Rights, Bloc Pensioners Together and Croatian Peasant Party Radić Brothers got 1,676 ballots (7.12%) and 2 elected representatives. The Law and Justice got 777 ballots (3.30%) while Independent Democratic Serb Party got 433 ballots (1.84%) which was both under the threshold to enter into the assembly.

In accordance with the Constitutional Act on the Rights of National Minorities in the Republic of Croatia in counties, cities, towns, and municipalities where the regular elections resulted in the underrepresentation of national minorities or ethnic Croats, additional elections were held on 5 October 2025. As Serbs of Croatia were underrepresented in the county assembly compared to their number in county's population they elected one additional representative from the Independent Democratic Serb Party. This increased the total number of elected representative to 32.

Summary of the 2025 Croatian local elections
Party	Votes	%	Seats
Croatian Democratic Union; Croatian Party of Pensioners	12,631	53.73	18
Social Democratic Party of Croatia; Croatian Peasant Party	6,276	26.69	9
Homeland Movement	1,715	7.29	2
Home and National Rally; Croatian Sovereignists; Croatian Party of Rights; Bloc Pensioners Together; Croatian Peasant Party Radić Brothers	1,676	7.12	2
Law and Justice	777	3.30	0
Independent Democratic Serb Party	433	1.84	0 +1 (additional elections)
Invalid/blank votes	1,112	4,52	—
Total	24,620	100	—
Registered voters/turnout	59,998	41.03	—
Source: (in Croatian)

=== Minority councils and representatives ===
Directly elected minority councils and representatives are tasked with consulting tasks for the local or regional authorities in which they are advocating for minority rights and interests, integration into public life and participation in the management of local affairs. At the 2023 Croatian national minorities councils and representatives elections Serbs of Croatia fulfilled legal requirements to elect 25 members minority council of the Požega-Slavonia County while Albanians, Czechs, Hungarians and Italians of Croatia elected individual representatives. Certain municipalities, towns or cities in the county elected their own local minority councils and representatives as well.

== See also ==
- Požega County of the Kingdom of Croatia-Slavonia
