= Belarus at the 2009 World Championships in Athletics =

- WA code: BLR
- National federation: Belarus Athletic Federation

in Berlin
- Competitors: 26
- Medals: Gold 0 Silver 0 Bronze 0 Total 0

World Championships in Athletics appearances
- 1993; 1995; 1997; 1999; 2001; 2003; 2005; 2007; 2009; 2011; 2013; 2015; 2017; 2019; 2022; 2023

Belarus competed at the 2009 World Championships in Athletics from 15–23 August. A team of 26 athletes was announced in preparation for the competition. Selected athletes have achieved one of the competition's qualifying standards. Among the stronger members of the team are reigning Olympic hammer throw champion Aksana Miankova and 2008 Olympic silver medallists Andrei Krauchanka and Natallia Mikhnevich.

== Team selection ==
Track and road events

Event	Athletes	
Event	Men	Women
100 metres		Yulia Nestsiarenka
200 metres		Alena Kievich
110 metres hurdles	Maksim Lynsha	—
20 km race walk	Dzianis Simanovich	Sniazhana Yurchanka
4×100 metres relay		Hanna Bahdanovich; Yulia Bulykina; Aksana Drahun; Alena Kievich; Yulia Nestsiarenka

Field and combined events

Event	Athletes	
Event	Men	Women
High jump	Artsiom Zaitsau	
Long jump		Nastassia Mironchyk
Triple jump	Dzmitry Dziatsuk	
Shot put	Yury Bialou; Pavel Lyzhyn; Andrei Mikhnevich	Natallia Mikhnevich
Discus throw		Iryna Yatchenko; Ellina Zvereva
Hammer throw	Pavel Kryvitski; Dzmitry Shako; Yury Shayunou	Aksana Miankova; Darya Pchelnik
Javelin throw	Aliaksandr Ashomka	Maryna Novik
Decathlon	Andrei Krauchanka	—

== Results ==
=== Men ===
Track and road events

Event	Athletes	Heat Round 1		Heat Round 2		Semifinal		Final	
Event	Athletes	Result	Rank	Result	Rank	Result	Rank	Result	Rank
110 m hurdles	Maksim Lynsha	13.61	18 q	-		13.46 PB	14	did not advance	
20 km walk	Dzianis Simanovich	-						1:23.36	22

Field events

Event	Athletes	Qualification		Final	
Event	Athletes	Result	Rank	Result	Rank
Triple jump	Dzmitry Dziatsuk	16.58	23	did not advance	
High jump	Artsiom Zaitsau	2.15	28	did not advance	
Shot put	Yury Bialou	19.75	9	did not advance	
Shot put	Pavel Lyzhyn	20.72	2 Q	20.98 PB	6
Shot put	Andrei Mikhnevich	20.65	1 Q	20.74	7
Javelin throw	Aliaksandr Ashomka	76.85	25	did not advance	
Hammer throw	Pavel Kryvitski	77.85	2 Q	76.00	8
Hammer throw	Dzmitry Shako	71.80	14	did not advance	
Hammer throw	Yury Shayunou	71.37	12	did not advance	
Decathlon	Andrei Krauchanka	-		8281	10

=== Women ===
Track and road events

Event	Athletes	Heat Round 1		Heat Round 2		Semifinal		Final	
Event	Athletes	Result	Rank	Result	Rank	Result	Rank	Result	Rank
100 m	Yulia Nestsiarenka	DNS							
200 m	Alena Kievich	23.59	30	-		did not advance			
4 × 100 m relay	Hanna Bahdanovich; Yulia Bulykina; Aksana Drahun; Alena Kievich; Yulia Nestsiarenka								
20 km walk	Sniazhana Yurchanka	-						1:34.57	15

Field and combined events

Event	Athletes	Qualification		Final	
Event	Athletes	Result	Rank	Result	Rank
Long jump	Nastassia Mironchyk	6.55	9 q	6.29	11
Shot put	Natallia Mikhnevich	19.12	3 Q	19.66	4
Discus throw	Iryna Yatchenko	NM		did not advance	
Discus throw	Ellina Zvereva	NM		did not advance	
Javelin throw	Maryna Novik	56.44	21	did not advance	
Hammer throw	Aksana Miankova	69.58	13	did not advance	
Hammer throw	Darya Pchelnik	69.58	15	did not advance	
