= Masters W35 hammer throw world record progression =

This is the progression of world record improvements of the hammer throw W35 division of Masters athletics.

Key

Incomplete information Pending

Distance	Athlete	Nationality	Birthdate	Location	Date	Ref
78.48 m	Anita Wlodarczyk	Poland	8 August 1985	Tokyo	3 August 2021	
77.93 m	Anita Wlodarczyk	Poland	8 August 1985	Bydgoszcz	30 June 2021	
74.06 m	Anita Wlodarczyk	Poland	8 August 1985	Poznań	26 June 2021	
74.03 m	Amber Campbell	United States	5 June 1981	Eugene	6 July 2016	
