= Marina Nichișenco =

Moldovan hammer thrower

Marina Nichișenco (Marghieva)
Personal information
- Born: 28 June 1986 (age 39) Vladikavkaz, Russian SFSR, Soviet Union
- Height: 1.86 m (6 ft 1 in)
- Weight: 82 kg (181 lb)

Sport
- Country: Moldova
- Sport: Track and field
- Event: Hammer throw

Marina Nichișenco, née Marghieva (Russian: Марина Сослановна Маргиева, Marina Soslanovna Margieva; born 28 June 1986) is a female hammer thrower who competes for Moldova. Her personal best throw is 71.50 metres, achieved in January 2009 in Chişinău. She is a former national record holder. Born in Russia, she is the older sister of Zalina Marghieva and Serghei Marghiev, and is coached by her father Soslan.

Nichișenco was due to compete at the 2012 Olympic Games but was withdrawn by her National Olympic Committee after her A-sample tested positive for stanozolol during a drug test. She was suspended for 2 years.

== Achievements ==
Year	Competition	Venue	Position	Notes
Representing Moldova
2007	European U23 Championships	Debrecen, Hungary	15th (q)	57.95 m
2007	Universiade	Bangkok, Thailand	15th	58.66 m
2008	Olympic Games	Beijing, PR China	43rd (q)	62.12 m
2009	Universiade	Belgrade, Serbia	7th	68.10 m
2009	World Championships	Berlin, Germany	33rd (q)	64.83 m
2009	World Athletics Final	Thessaloniki, Greece	7th	65.29 m
2010	European Championships	Barcelona, Spain	6th	70.77 m
2011	Universiade	Shenzhen, China	8th	65.83 m
2011	World Championships	Daegu, South Korea	17th (q)	67.95 m
2012	Olympic Games*	London, United Kingdom	DNC	0.00
2015	World Championships	Beijing, China	25th (q)	66.63 m
2016	European Championships	Amsterdam, Netherlands	14th (q)	67.76 m
2016	Olympic Games	Rio de Janeiro, Brazil	24th (q)	65.19 m
2017	World Championships	London, United Kingdom	27th (q)	64.63 m
2018	European Championships	Berlin, Germany	24th (q)	64.37 m

Note: Was scheduled to compete, withdrawn due to positive results from a drug test.
