= Athletics at the 2012 Summer Olympics – Women's hammer throw =

Women's hammer throw at the Games of the XXX Olympiad
- Venue: Olympic Stadium
- Date: 8–10 August
- Competitors: 37 from 25 nations
- Winning distance: 77.60 OR

Medalists
1st place, gold medalist(s)		Anita Włodarczyk	Poland
2nd place, silver medalist(s)		Betty Heidler	Germany
3rd place, bronze medalist(s)		Zhang Wenxiu	China

Official Video Highlights

The women's hammer throw competition at the 2012 Summer Olympics in London, United Kingdom. The event was held at the Olympic Stadium on 8–10 August. Each athlete receives three throws in the qualifying round. All who achieve the qualifying distance progress to the final. If less than twelve athletes achieve this mark, then the twelve furthest throwing athletes reach the final. Each finalist is allowed three throws in last round, with the top eight athletes after that point being given three further attempts.

== Summary ==
Eight entrants achieve the auto qualifier, five on their first attempt. It took 70.48 to make the final. Sophie Hitchon improved her own National record in the process.

In the first round of the final, reigning world champion Tatyana Lysenko was out to continue that success, tossing a new Olympic record 77.56. In the second round Zhang Wenxiu moved into second place. Kathrin Klaas made her best throw in the third round to move into third place, while world record holder Betty Heidler barely earned her final three throws in eighth place. In the fifth round, Heidler finally put one throw together, landing about 77 metres. But after a delay, the electronic measurement system only attributed 72.34 meters as the distance (actually the measurement of the following competitor Zalina Marghieva's throw). Confused officials couldn't find a proper solution, ultimately giving the struggling Heidler another throw. The extra throw was so bad Heidler walked out of the ring, deliberately fouling. Anita Włodarczyk moved into second place only 44 cm behind Lysenko's record. As the last thrower in the round, Lysenko improved the Olympic record to 78.18, solidifying her hold on gold, which turned out to be important as Włodarczyk's final throw of 77.60 beat Lysenko's first round record by 4 cm. After the competition was over, the measurement operators found a measurement of 77.13 in the system memory and credited it to Heidler, giving her third place, knocking Zhang out of what would have been her second consecutive bronze medal.

=== Disqualification of Tatyana Lysenko ===
On 11 October 2016, IOC announced the disqualification of the gold medalist, Tatyana Lysenko, due to an anti-doping rule violation. Lysenko was ordered to return the medal and the IAAF was requested to modify the result of the event accordingly. Anita Włodarczyk is next in line to the gold medal, promoting Betty Heidler to second place and Zhang Wenxiu to third. On 30 March 2017, Gulfiya Khanafeyeva and Mariya Bespalova were also disqualified and had their results deleted.

== Schedule ==
Entry List by Event. IAAF (2012-07-27). Retrieved on 2012-07-29. All times are British Summer Time (UTC+1)

Date	Time	Round
Wednesday, 8 August 2012	10:00	Qualifications
Friday, 10 August 2012	19:35	Finals

== Records ==
Prior to the competition, the existing World and Olympic records were as follows.

World record	Betty Heidler (GER)	79.42 m	Halle, Germany	21 May 2011
Olympic record	Aksana Miankova (BLR) (Later disqualified for doping)	*76.34 m*	Beijing, China	20 August 2008
~~2012 World leading~~	~~Aksana Miankova (BLR)~~	~~78.69 m~~	~~Minsk, Belarus~~	~~8 July 2012~~

The following records were established during the competition:

Date	Event	Name	Nationality	Distance	Record
10 August	Final	~~Tatyana Lysenko~~	Russia	~~78.18 m~~	~~OR~~
10 August	Final	Anita Włodarczyk	Poland	77.60 m	OR

== Results ==
=== Qualifying round ===
- 40 Entrants as of 27 July 2012.

Qual. rule: qualification standard 73.00m (Q) or at least best 12 qualified (q).

Rank	Group	Name	Nationality	#1	#2	#3	Result	Notes
1	A	Anita Włodarczyk	Poland	75.68	–	–	75.68	Q
2	B	Zhang Wenxiu	China	74.53	–	–	74.53	Q
3	A	Betty Heidler	Germany	72.63	74.44	–	74.44	Q
DSQ	A	Tatyana Lysenko	Russia	74.43	–	–	74.43	Q
5	B	Kathrin Klaas	Germany	74.14	–	–	74.14	Q
6	A	Yipsi Moreno	Cuba	73.95	–	–	73.95	Q
DSQ	B	Mariya Bespalova	Russia	72.83	73.56	–	73.56	Q
DSQ	B	Aksana Miankova	Belarus	69.04	X	73.10	73.10	Q
DSQ	B	Zalina Marghieva	Moldova	71.89	72.19	X	72.19	q
10	A	Sophie Hitchon	Great Britain	67.21	X	71.98	71.98	q, NR
11	B	Stéphanie Falzon	France	70.96	71.67	69.55	71.67	q
12	B	Joanna Fiodorow	Poland	70.48	68.48	69.89	70.48	q
13	A	Amber Campbell	United States	X	69.93	67.30	69.93	
14	A	Jessica Cosby	United States	67.36	69.65	68.97	69.65	
15	A	Kıvılcım Kaya	Turkey	69.50	68.45	67.84	69.50	
DSQ	B	Gulfiya Khanafeyeva	Russia	68.20	69.43	69.19	69.43	
17	B	Éva Orbán	Hungary	X	68.64	63.08	68.64	
18	A	Johana Moreno	Colombia	68.53	X	68.12	68.53	
19	A	Hanna Skydan	Ukraine	68.50	66.68	57.69	68.50	
20	A	Martina Hrašnová	Slovakia	67.69	68.41	67.75	68.41	
21	B	Berta Castells	Spain	67.74	68.41	65.26	68.41	
22	A	Bianca Perie	Romania	X	68.34	X	68.34	
23	B	Arasay Thondike	Cuba	67.93	65.81	X	67.93	
24	B	Tuğçe Şahutoğlu	Turkey	67.58	64.11	66.56	67.58	
25	A	Ariannis Vichy	Cuba	X	67.48	64.25	67.48	
26	A	Sultana Frizell	Canada	66.07	67.45	X	67.45	
27	A	Rosa Rodríguez	Venezuela	66.66	X	67.34	67.34	
28	B	Amanda Bingson	United States	65.96	66.32	67.29	67.29	
29	B	Barbara Špiler	Slovenia	65.69	62.83	67.21	67.21	
DSQ	A	Alena Matoshka	Belarus	66.85	67.03	65.22	67.03	
31	B	Kateřina Šafránková	Czech Republic	66.16	X	65.25	66.16	
32	A	Amy Sène	Senegal	65.49	65.43	X	65.49	
33	B	Iryna Novozhylova	Ukraine	65.35	63.98	64.29	65.35	
34	B	Heather Steacy	Canada	62.99	61.79	63.40	63.40	
35	B	Vânia Silva	Portugal	62.81	62.18	X	62.81	
36	A	Silvia Salis	Italy	X	10.84	X	10.84	
–	B	Jennifer Dahlgren	Argentina	X	X	X	NM	

=== Final ===
Rank	Name	Nationality	#1	#2	#3	#4	#5	#6	Result	Notes
1st place, gold medalist(s)	Anita Włodarczyk	Poland	75.01	76.02	75.72	X	77.10	77.60	77.60	OR, SB
2nd place, silver medalist(s)	Betty Heidler	Germany	73.90	71.52	72.77	X	77.13	72.77	77.13	
3rd place, bronze medalist(s)	Zhang Wenxiu	China	72.96	76.34	73.81	68.20	75.56	X	76.34	
4	Kathrin Klaas	Germany	x	72.79	76.05	74.66	72.88	X	76.05	PB
5	Yipsi Moreno	Cuba	74.60	X	X	X	71.97	X	74.60	
6	Stephanie Falzon	France	73.06	69.29	71.10	—N/a	—N/a	—N/a	73.06	SB
7	Joanna Fiodorow	Poland	62.34	72.37	X	—N/a	—N/a	—N/a	72.37	
8	Sophie Hitchon	Great Britain	69.33	65.75	X	—N/a	—N/a	—N/a	69.33	
DSQ	Tatyana Lysenko	Russia	77.56	75.86	74.39	77.12	78.18	77.28	~~78.18~~	
DSQ	Aksana Miankova	Belarus	69.50	X	74.40	72.06	X	X	~~74.40~~	
DSQ	Zalina Marghieva	Moldova	73.77	74.06	72.32	72.91	72.34	70.72	~~74.06~~	
DSQ	Mariya Bespalova	Russia	71.13	X	68.15	—N/a	—N/a	—N/a	~~71.13~~	
