= Sultana Frizell =

Canadian hammer thrower

Personal information
- Born: 24 October 1984 (age 41) Perth, Ontario, Canada
- Height: 6 ft 0 in (183 cm)
- Weight: 260 lb (118 kg)

Sport
- Country: Canada
- Sport: Hammer throw
- Club: Ottawa Lions

Achievements and titles
- Personal bests: Hammer throw: 75.04 m, Tucson, 2012
Medal record
Women's hammer throw
Commonwealth Games
Gold medal – first place	2010 Delhi	Hammer throw
Gold medal – first place	2014 Glasgow	Hammer throw
Pan American Games
Silver medal – second place	2011 Guadalajara	Hammer throw
Bronze medal – third place	2015 Toronto	Hammer throw

Sultana Frizell (born 24 October 1984) is a Canadian track and field athlete competing in the hammer throw. Frizell currently trains under the guidance of Derek Evely in Kamloops, British Columbia. She competed at the 2008 Olympic Games in Beijing and the 2012 Olympic Games in London. Frizell is the former Commonwealth Games champion in the hammer throw and Commonwealth Games record holder for the event as well.

== Career ==
Frizell was born in Perth, Ontario and started her athletic career in figure skating before taking up track and field in high school. While attending Perth and District Collegiate Institute, she competed in the shot put, discus, javelin, and hammer throw. She won gold medals in hammer and shot put and silver in discus at 2003 Canadian junior championships. She also took fourth in the hammer and sixth in shot put at 2003 Pan Am junior championships. Although she set a Canadian High School Record in the shot put, she ultimately decided to focus on the hammer throw.

Frizell graduated from high school in 2003 and immediately enrolled at the University of Georgia where she competed for three seasons. In her first season, Frizell showed tremendous improvement. She placed ninth at the NCAA Championships and third at the Canadian Track and Field Championships. She also improved her personal bests in the shot put and javelin. She finished the season with a best of 63.36 meters in the hammer throw. In 2005, Frizell improved her best to 66.42 meters. She improved her placing at both the NCAA Championships and Canadian Championships, finishing sixth and second respectively.

For the 2006 season, Frizell returned to her native Ontario to train. She continued to progress and won her first Canadian national title in 2007. She also qualified for the 2007 Pan American Games where she placed seventh. On 1 November 2007, Frizell relocated to Kamloops, British Columbia to train under the guidance of former world record holder Anatoliy Bondarchuk. During the 2008 season, Frizell broke the Canadian senior women's hammer throw record four times and improved her personal best by over three meters. Her personal best throw of 70.94 meters was in July 2008 at the Canadian Track and Field Championships in Windsor, Ontario. That mark qualified her for the 2008 Olympic Games in Beijing, where she placed 33rd out of 50 competitors.

=== Repeat Commonwealth champion ===
Frizell came back even stronger during the 2009 season and set two more national records. She also qualified for her first World Championships final and placed tenth in Berlin at the 12th IAAF World Championships in Athletics. In 2010, she set another national record of 72.24 meters came at the Fränkisch-Crumbach Hammer Meeting in Germany. She concluded her season with a gold medal and meet record performance at the Commonwealth Games in Delhi. The following year, Frizell won a silver medal at the 2011 Pan American Games. This event fell on her birthday, thus Frizell was able achieve a personal gift for herself.

The 2012 Summer Olympics in London were a disappointment for Frizell, as her first and best throw did not count due to a glitch in the computerized measuring system. Her following two throws also failed to count and she did not qualify for the finals. At the 2014 Commonwealth Games in Glasgow Frizell broke her own Games record three times, throwing a high of 71.97 metres to defend her Commonwealth Games title. She was named Canada's flag-bearer for the Games' closing ceremonies.

== Honours ==
In 2012 Frizell was awarded the Queen Elizabeth II Diamond Jubilee Medal.

== Achievements ==
Year	Competition	Venue	Position	Event	Notes
Representing Canada
2004	NACAC U23 Championships	Sherbrooke, Canada	5th	Shot put	13.72 m
2004	NACAC U23 Championships	Sherbrooke, Canada	3rd	Hammer throw	57.38 m
2005	Universiade	İzmir, Turkey	13th	Shot put	13.30 m
2005	Universiade	İzmir, Turkey	15th (q)	Hammer throw	59.03 m
2006	NACAC U23 Championships	Santo Domingo, Dominican Republic	3rd	Shot put	15.18 m
2006	NACAC U23 Championships	Santo Domingo, Dominican Republic	4th	Hammer throw	60.61 m
2007	Pan American Games	Rio de Janeiro, Brazil	7th	Hammer throw	63.25 m
2008	Olympic Games	Beijing, China	33rd (q)	Hammer throw	65.44 m
2009	World Championships	Berlin, Germany	10th	Hammer throw	70.88 m
2009	World Athletics Final	Thessaloniki, Greece	6th	Hammer throw	68.07 m
2010	Commonwealth Games	Delhi, India	1st	Hammer throw	68.57 m
2011	Pan American Games	Guadalajara, Mexico	2nd	Hammer throw	70.11 m
2012	Olympic Games	London, United Kingdom	26th (q)	Hammer throw	67.45 m
2013	World Championships	Moscow, Russia	16th (q)	Hammer throw	69.06 m
2013	Jeux de la Francophonie	Nice, France	4th	Hammer throw	67.85 m
2014	Commonwealth Games	Glasgow, United Kingdom	1st	Hammer throw	71.97 m
2015	Pan American Games	Toronto, Canada	3rd	Hammer throw	69.51 m
2015	World Championships	Beijing, China	13th (q)	Hammer throw	69.66 m
2018	Commonwealth Games	Gold Coast, Australia	4th	Hammer throw	63.94 m
