= Małgorzata Zadura =

Polish hammer thrower

Personal information
- Nationality: Poland
- Born: 3 October 1982 (age 43) Lubań, Poland
- Height: 1.71 m (5 ft 7 1/2 in)
- Weight: 85 kg (187 lb)

Sport
- Sport: Athletics
- Event: Hammer throw
- Club: AZS Warszawa
- Coached by: Marcin Góra

Achievements and titles
- Personal best: Hammer throw: 70.36 m (2010)

Małgorzata Zadura (born October 3, 1982 in Lubań) is a retired Polish hammer thrower. Zadura represented Poland at the 2008 Summer Olympics in Beijing, where she competed for the women's hammer throw, along with her compatriots Anita Włodarczyk and Kamila Skolimowska. She performed the best throw of 64.13 metres on her second attempt, finishing thirty-eighth overall in the qualifying rounds.

Her personal best in the event is 70.36 metres, set in 2010 in Lublin.

== Competition record ==
Year	Competition	Venue	Position	Notes
Representing Poland
2003	European U23 Championships	Bydgoszcz, Poland	14th (q)	59.81 m
2008	Olympic Games	Beijing, China	38th (q)	64.13 m
2009	Universiade	Belgrade, Serbia	11th (q)	63.98 m
2010	European Championships	Barcelona, Spain	16th (q)	65.45 m
