= Kathrin Klaas =

German hammer thrower

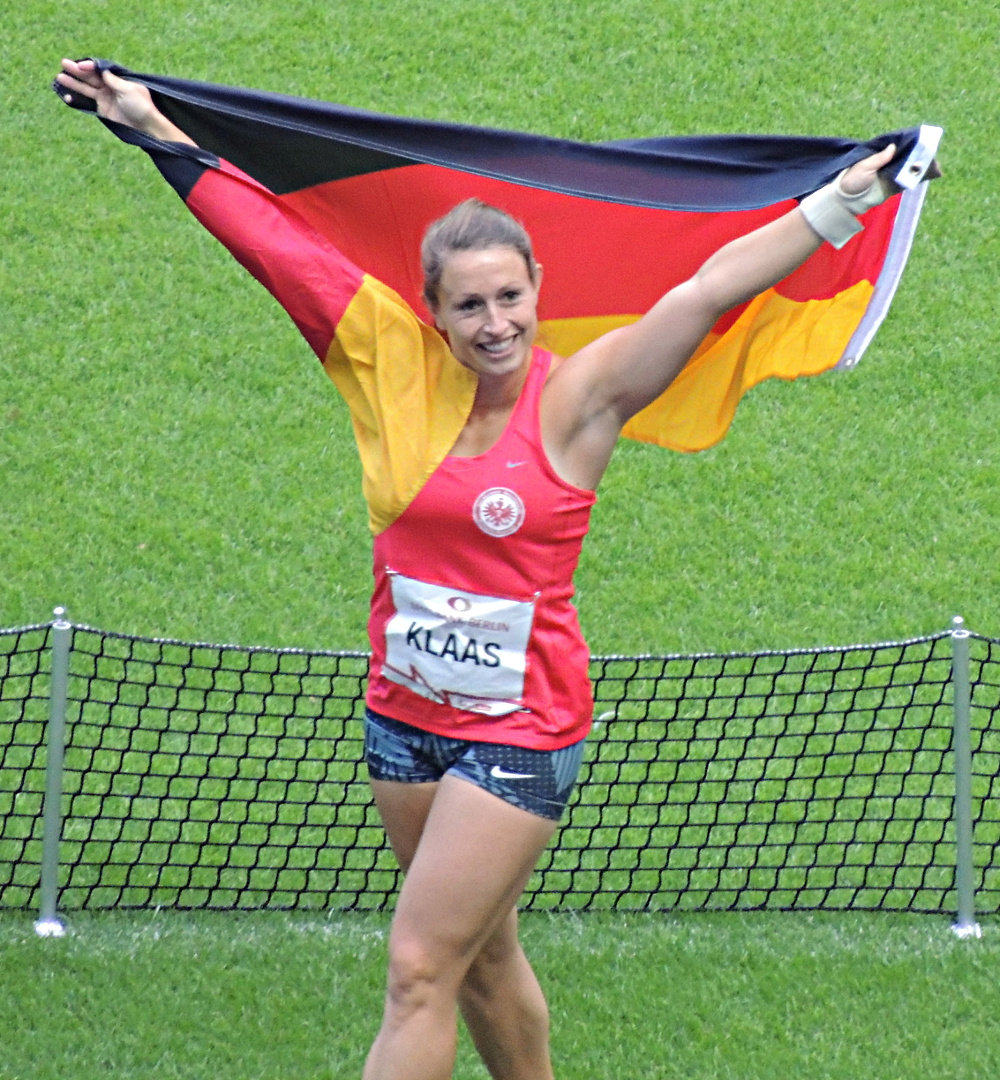
- Kathrin Klaas at the 2015 ISTAF Berlin meet.

Personal information
- Born: February 6, 1984 (age 42) Haiger, Hesse, West Germany
- Height: 1.68 m (5 ft 6 in)
- Weight: 72 kg (159 lb)

Sport
- Country: Germany
- Sport: Athletics
- Event: Hammer throw

Achievements and titles
- Personal best: 76.05 m (2012)
- Updated on 14 August 2012

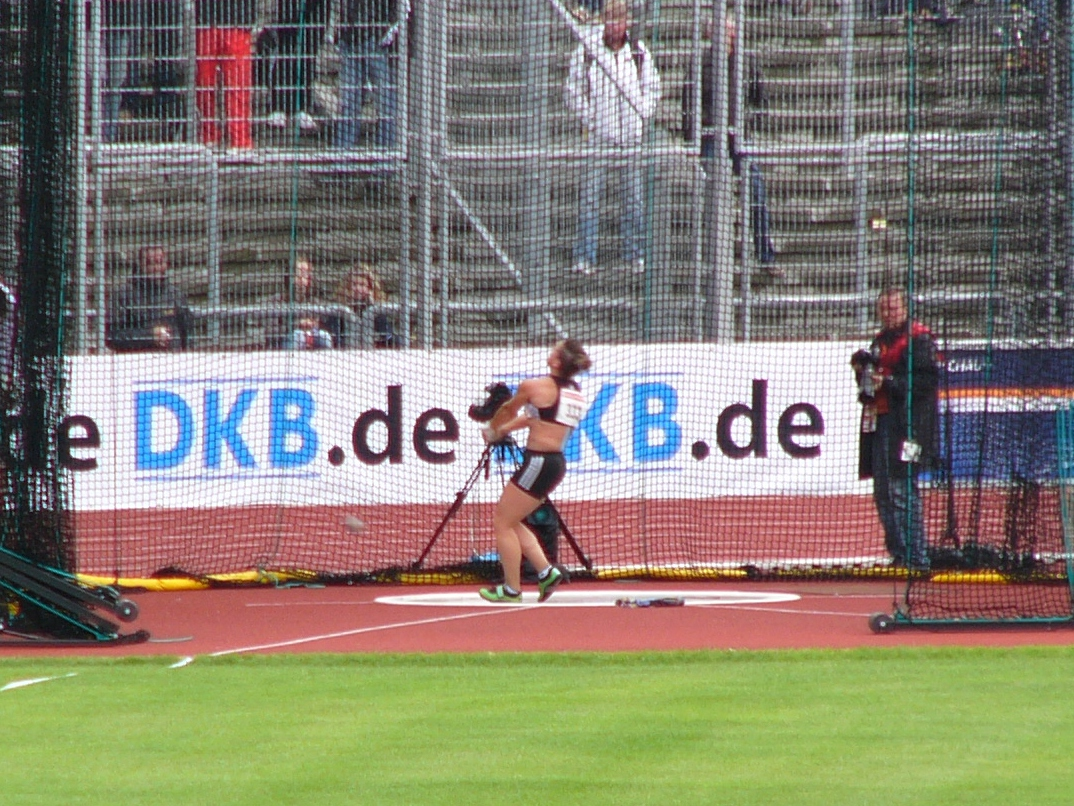
Kathrin Klaas at the 2011 German Athletics Championships.

Kathrin Klaas (born 6 February 1984 in Haiger, Hesse) is a female hammer thrower from Germany. She is member of the Eintracht Frankfurt athletes team.

Her personal best throw is 76.05 metres, set at the 2012 Summer Olympics.

== Achievements ==
| Year | Competition | Venue | Position | Notes |
Representing Germany
| 2003 | European Junior Championships | Tampere, Finland | 8th | 58.94 m |
| 2005 | European U23 Championships | Erfurt, Germany | 4th | 66.50 m |
| 2005 | World Championships | Helsinki, Finland | — | NM |
| 2006 | European Championships | Gothenburg, Sweden | 6th | 70.59 m |
| 2006 | World Athletics Final | Stuttgart, Germany | 7th | 66.38 m |
| 2007 | World Championships | Osaka, Japan | 28th (q) | 64.00 m |
| 2007 | World Athletics Final | Stuttgart, Germany | 6th | 69.00 m |
| 2008 | Olympic Games | Beijing, China | 24th (q) | 67.54 m |
| 2009 | World Championships | Berlin, Germany | 4th | 74.23 m |
| 2009 | Universiade | Belgrade, Serbia | 3rd | 70.97 m |
| 2009 | World Athletics Final | Thessaloniki, Greece | 4th | 69.50 m |
| 2010 | European Championships | Barcelona, Spain | 15th (q) | 65.82 m |
| 2011 | World Championships | Berlin, Germany | 7th | 71.89 m |
| 2012 | European Championships | Helsinki, Finland | 4th | 70.44 m |
| 2012 | Olympic Games | London, United Kingdom | 5th | 76.05 m |
| 2013 | World Championships | Moscow, Russia | 20th (q) | 68.34 m |
| 2014 | European Championships | Zürich, Switzerland | 4th | 72.89 m |
| 2015 | World Championships | Beijing, China | 6th | 73.18 m |
| 2016 | European Championships | Amsterdam, Netherlands | 25th (q) | 64.39 m |
| 2016 | Olympic Games | Rio de Janeiro, Brazil | 18th (q) | 67.92 m |
| 2017 | World Championships | London, United Kingdom | 11th | 68.91 m |
| 2018 | European Championships | Berlin, Germany | 7th | 71.50 m |
