= Athletics at the 2008 Summer Olympics – Women's hammer throw =

Women's hammer throw at the Games of the XXIX Olympiad
- Venue: Beijing National Stadium
- Date: 18 August 2008 (qualification); 20 August 2008 (final)
- Competitors: 50 from 34 nations
- Winning distance: 76.34 OR

Medalists
1st place, gold medalist(s)		Yipsi Moreno	Cuba
2nd place, silver medalist(s)		Zhang Wenxiu	China
3rd place, bronze medalist(s)		Manuela Montebrun	France

The women's hammer throw event at the 2008 Summer Olympics took place on 18–20 August at the Beijing National Stadium.

The qualifying standards were 69.50 m (A standard) and 67.00 m (B standard).

In 2016, it was announced that reanalysis of samples from 2008 resulted in doping violations by Aksana Miankova and Darya Pchelnik being detected, and they were disqualified. Medals have been reallocated by IAAF.

== Schedule ==
All times are China standard time (UTC+8)

Date	Time	Round
Monday, 18 August 2008	09:10	Qualifications
Wednesday, 20 August 2008	19:20	Finals

== Records ==
Prior to the competition, the existing World and Olympic records were as follows.

World record	Tatyana Lysenko (RUS)	77.80 m	Tallinn, Estonia	15 August 2006
Olympic record	Olga Kuzenkova (RUS)	75.02 m	Athens, Greece	25 August 2004

The following new Olympic record was set during this competition:

Date	Event	Athlete	Time	Notes
~~20 August~~	~~Final~~	~~Aksana Miankova (BLR)~~	~~76.34~~	~~OR~~

== Results ==
=== Qualifying round ===
Qualification: 71.50 (Q) or at least 12 best performers (q) advance to the final.

Rank	Group	Athlete	Nationality	#1	#2	#3	Result	Notes
1	A	Yipsi Moreno	Cuba	71.31	x	73.92	73.92	Q
2	B	Zhang Wenxiu	China	73.36			73.36	Q
3	A	Martina Danišová-Hrašnová	Slovakia	70.03	x	72.87	72.87	Q
4	B	Manuela Montebrun	France	69.80	69.86	72.81	72.81	Q
5	B	Clarissa Claretti	Italy	67.15	71.82		71.82	Q
6	A	Anita Włodarczyk	Poland	71.76			71.76	Q
7	A	Betty Heidler	Germany	66.28	71.51		71.51	Q
8	A	Darya Pchelnik	Belarus	69.43	71.30	69.24	71.30	DSQ
9	B	Yelena Priyma	Russia	70.69	69.79	65.64	70.69	q
10	B	Kamila Skolimowska	Poland	65.97	69.79	67.01	69.79	q
DSQ	B	Aksana Miankova	Belarus	62.95	65.55	69.77	69.77	q
12	A	Stiliani Papadopoulou	Greece	66.68	69.36	69.29	69.36	q
13	A	Maryia Smaliachkova	Belarus	x	69.22	x	69.22	
14	A	Stéphanie Falzon	France	x	68.93	x	68.93	
15	B	Arasay Thondike	Cuba	x	66.68	68.74	68.74	
16	A	Ivana Brkljacić	Croatia	66.54	x	68.38	68.38	
17	B	Sviatlana Sudak-Torun	Turkey	68.22	67.36	67.18	68.22	
18	A	Bianca Perie	Romania	68.21	66.29	x	68.21	
19	A	Iryna Novozhylova	Ukraine	67.36	x	68.11	68.11	
20	A	Anna Bulgakova	Russia	x	68.04	x	68.04	
21	B	Amber Campbell	United States	67.86	x	x	67.86	
22	A	Yelena Konevtseva	Russia	66.81	67.83	x	67.83	
23	B	Eileen O'Keeffe	Ireland	62.53	62.05	67.66	67.66	
24	B	Kathrin Klaas	Germany	66.39	67.54	66.95	67.54	
25	B	Iryna Sekachova	Ukraine	62.83	x	67.47	67.47	
26	B	Lenka Ledvinová	Czech Republic	65.98	65.23	67.17	67.17	
27	A	Inna Sayenko	Ukraine	x	66.92	x	66.92	
28	B	Alexandra Papageorgiou	Greece	66.72	65.73	x	66.72	
29	B	Jennifer Dahlgren	Argentina	58.60	x	66.35	66.35	
30	A	Merja Korpela	Finland	62.70	65.76	66.29	66.29	
31	B	Yunaika Crawford	Cuba	66.16	65.00	64.08	66.16	
32	A	Wang Zheng	China	65.64	61.36	x	65.64	
33	A	Sultana Frizell	Canada	x	60.43	65.44	65.44	
34	A	Éva Orbán	Hungary	65.12	x	65.41	65.41	
35	A	Zoe Derham	Great Britain	64.74	64.61	64.57	64.74	
36	B	Johana Moreno	Colombia	x	64.31	64.66	64.66	
37	A	Zalina Marghieva	Moldova	x	64.20	x	64.20	
38	B	Małgorzata Zadura	Poland	63.35	64.13	x	64.13	
39	A	Loree Smith	United States	62.25	62.33	63.60	63.60	
40	B	Candice Scott	Trinidad and Tobago	63.03	62.53	x	63.03	
41	B	Berta Castells	Spain	62.44	61.76	x	62.44	
42	A	Silvia Salis	Italy	x	x	62.28	62.28	
43	B	Marina Marghieva	Moldova	61.03	x	62.12	62.12	
44	B	Paraskevi Theodorou	Cyprus	x	61.00	x	61.00	
45	B	Sanja Gavrilovic	Croatia	60.55	60.37	60.36	60.55	
46	A	Vânia Silva	Portugal	x	58.10	59.42	59.42	
47	A	Galina Mityaeva	Tajikistan	x	48.59	51.38	51.38	
	A	Jessica Cosby	United States	x	x	x	NM	
	B	Amélie Perrin	France	x	x	x	NM	
	B	Georgina Toth	Cameroon	x	x	x	NM	

AR area record | CR championship record | GR games record | NR national record | OR Olympic record | PB personal best | SB season best | WL world leading (in a given season)
DNS = did not start | DQ = disqualification | NM = no mark (i.e. no valid result) | Q = qualification by place in heat | q = qualification by overall place

=== Finals ===
Rank	Athlete	Nationality	1	2	3	4	5	6	Result	Notes
DSQ	Aksana Miankova	Belarus	74.40	x	72.23	x	76.34	51.72	76.34	OR
1st place, gold medalist(s)	Yipsi Moreno	Cuba	x	73.95	72.61	x	74.70	75.20	75.20	
2nd place, silver medalist(s)	Zhang Wenxiu	China	74.00	74.32	73.40	73.50	70.75	73.53	74.32	SB
DSQ	Darya Pchelnik	Belarus	69.10	72.46	72.82	71.00	72.83	73.65	73.65	
3rd place, bronze medalist(s)	Manuela Montebrun	France	67.63	70.55	70.01	72.54	71.92	70.63	72.54	
4	Anita Włodarczyk	Poland	69.39	x	71.56	70.86	x	x	71.56	
5	Clarissa Claretti	Italy	x	71.33	x	x	x	x	71.33	
6	Martina Danišová-Hrasnová	Slovakia	68.28	x	71.00	x	70.19	x	71.00	
7	Betty Heidler	Germany	x	x	70.06				70.06	
8	Yelena Priyma	Russia	68.19	69.72	67.33				69.72	
9	Stilianí Papadopoúlou	Greece	x	x	64.97				64.97	
	Kamila Skolimowska	Poland	x	x	x				NM	
