= Oksana Kondratyeva =

Russian hammer thrower (born 1985)

Personal information
- Native name: Оксана Кондратьева
- Full name: Oksana Yuryevna Kondratieva
- Born: 22 November 1985 (age 40) Moscow, Russian SFSR, Soviet Union

Oksana Kondratyeva
Medal record

Women's athletics

Representing Russia

Universiade
Disqualified	2013 Kazan	Hammer throw

Oksana Yurevna Kondratyeva (Russian: Оксана Юрьевна Кондратьева; born 22 November 1985) is a Russian track and field athlete competing in the hammer throw. Her personal best of 77.13 m (253 ft 1/2 in) ranks her in the all-time top ten of the event. She represented Russia at the 2013 World Championships in Athletics, placing seventh.

She is a four-time participant at the Summer Universiade, with her best performance coming in 2013, when she won the silver medal. She holds the title of Russia Master of Sport – International Class. She is the daughter of hammer thrower Yuriy Sedykh and sprinter Lyudmila Kondratyeva.

== Career ==
=== Early life and career ===
Raised in Moscow, she is the daughter of two Soviet Olympic champions: 1976 and 1980 Olympic hammer throw champion Yuriy Sedykh and 100 metres Olympic champion Lyudmila Kondratyeva. Her half-sister Alexia Sedykh is also an international hammer thrower and was the 2010 Summer Youth Olympics champion competing for France. Oksana Kondratyeva became a member of the Moscow Youth Sports Club and began competing in the hammer in her late teens.

In 2004, she placed third in the Russian junior category and was third in the Moscow regional championship. She won the Moscow under-23 competition the following year, clearing sixty metres for the first time, and ranked seventh nationally in the national winter throws and Russian Athletics Championships. Her best performance in 2005 was a throw of 62.24 m (204 ft 2 1/4 in) for fifth at the Russian Athletics Cup. She competed sparingly in 2006 while studying, but managed to win the Russian under-23 title. She had a new best at the 2007 Russian Winter Throwing event, placing third with a mark of 65.76 m (215 ft 8 3/4 in). This earned her a spot at the 2007 Summer Universiade in Bangkok, although with a throw of 53.93 m (176 ft 11 in) she was well below par on her international debut.

=== First senior competitions ===
Kondratyeva entered the full senior ranks in 2008 and continued to improve, first throwing 65.10 m (213 ft 6 3/4 in) for fourth at the Brothers Znamensky Memorial then 66.08 m (216 ft 9 1/2 in) as runner-up at the Moscow Championships. She won at the Kuts Memorial, but ranked seventh at the national championships. She had three straight wins at the start of 2009, setting new bests each time to end up with 67.19 m (220 ft 5 1/4 in) and the Russian Team Championships title. She gained her second call-up for Russia at the 2009 Summer Universiade and placed thirteenth in the final. Her season peaked with a best of 67.84 m (222 ft 6 3/4 in) for second place at the Russian Championships, but this did not gain her selection for the 2009 World Championships in Athletics as she did not hold the "A" qualifying standard.

Her upward trend continued into 2010, when she threw over 68 metres several times and placed second at the Russian Winter Championships and third in her group at the 2010 European Cup Winter Throwing. At the Russian Athletics Cup she cleared seventy metres for the first time to place second to Tatyana Lysenko with a new personal best of 71.90 m (235 ft 10 1/2 in). This made her the 14th best hammer thrower globally that year. Despite this, she was below sixty metres and out of the top eight at that year's national championships.

At the start of 2011 she competed on the global circuit for the first time and placed fourth at the Meeting Grand Prix IAAF de Dakar. Her best throw that season came in the final of the Russian Championships, where her mark of 69.87 m (229 ft 2 3/4 in) left her again runner-up to Lysenko. Having opted for post-graduate study, she was eligible for the 2011 Summer Universiade and had her best finish at the games by coming sixth overall. Kondratyeva cleared seventy metres on numerous occasions in 2012, although improved national depth meant she did not place much higher: she had a best of 73.31 m (240 ft 6 in) in Moscow in June, but her mark of 72.22 m (236 ft 11 1/4 in) at the Russian Championships left her in fifth place. She ranked twentieth in the world that year internationally.

=== 2013 World Championships ===
Kondratyeva, after five years in the senior ranks, finally reached international level performances. She began with a win at the Yuliya Pechonkina Prizes meet then was victorious at the Russian Cup with 74.82 m (245 ft 5 1/2 in). A throw of 77.13 m (253 ft 1/2 in) to win at the Znamensky Memorial put her at the top of the yearly rankings. This moved her up to sixth place on the all-time women's hammer throw lists. Her fourth consecutive appearance at the Summer Universiade (held on home soil in Kazan) brought her first international medal in the form of a silver behind American Jeneva McCall. A third place at the Russian Championships with a mark of 74.52 m (244 ft 5 3/4 in) meant she was chosen to represent Russia at the 2013 World Championships in Athletics in Moscow. She performed well on her first appearance on the global championship stage: her opening throw of 73.89 m (242 ft 5 in) made her the fifth best in qualifying and her best mark in the hammer throw final of 72.76 m (238 ft 8 1/2 in) meant she finished seventh in the event (national rival Lysenko won the competition and another Russian, Anna Bulgakova, was fifth).

At the beginning of 2014 she ranked in the top eight at the Golden Grand Prix and World Challenge Beijing meetings.

=== Doping ===
On 7 April 2021, Kondratyeva was banned for four years by the Court of Arbitration for Sport for an anti doping rule violation with all her results from 2 July 2013 onwards disqualified, including her silver medal at the 2013 Universiade and her 7th placed finish at the 2013 world championships.

== Personal bests ==
- Hammer throw – 77.13 m (253 ft 1/2 in) (2013)

== International competition record ==
Year	Competition	Venue	Position	Notes
2007	Universiade	Bangkok, Thailand	19th	53.93 m
2009	Universiade	Belgrade, Serbia	13th	63.98 m
2011	Universiade	Shenzhen, China	5th	67.40 m
2013	Universiade	Kazan, Russia	2nd	72.22 m
2013	World Championships	Moscow, Russia	7th	72.76 m
