= 2009 World Championships in Athletics – Women's hammer throw =

Women's Hammer Throw 2009 event

The Women's Hammer Throw event at the 2009 World Championships in Athletics was held at the Olympic Stadium on August 20 and August 22.

== Medalists ==
Gold	Anita Włodarczyk; Poland (POL)
Silver	Betty Heidler; Germany (GER)
Bronze	Martina Hrašnová; Slovakia (SVK)

== Abbreviations ==
- All results shown are in metres

Q	automatic qualification
q	qualification by rank
DNS	did not start
NM	no mark
WR	world record
AR	area record
NR	national record
PB	personal best
SB	season best

== Records ==
Prior to the competition, the existing records were as follows.

World Record	Tatyana Lysenko (RUS)	77.80	Tallinn, Estonia	15 August 2006
Championship Record	Mihaela Melinte (ROU)	75.20	Seville, Spain	24 August 1999
World Leading	Anita Włodarczyk (POL)	77.20	Cottbus, Germany	8 August 2009
African Record	Marwa Hussein (EGY)	68.48	Cairo, Egypt	18 February 2002
Asian Record	Zhang Wenxiu (CHN)	74.86	Shijiazhuang, China	3 August 2007
North American record	Yipsi Moreno (CUB)	76.62	Zagreb, Croatia	9 September 2008
South American record	Jennifer Dahlgren (ARG)	72.94	Athens, Georgia, United States	13 April 2007
European Record	Tatyana Lysenko (RUS)	77.80	Tallinn, Estonia	15 August 2006
Oceanian Record	Bronwyn Eagles (AUS)	71.12	Adelaide, Australia	6 February 2003

The following records were set during this competition.

Date	Event	Athlete	Distance	Records broken
22 August	Final	Anita Włodarczyk (POL)	77.96 m	WR, CR, WL, ER

== Qualification standards ==
A standard	B standard
70.00m	67.50m

== Schedule ==
Date	Time	Round
August 20, 2009	14:15	Qualification
August 22, 2009	19:30	Final

== Results ==
=== Qualification ===
Qualification: Qualifying Performance 72.00 (Q) or at least 12 best performers (q) advance to the final.

Rank	Group	Athlete	Nationality	#1	#2	#3	Result	Notes
1	A	Betty Heidler	Germany	75.27			75.27	Q, CR
2	A	Anita Włodarczyk	Poland	74.54			74.54	Q
3	B	Zhang Wenxiu	China	72.72			72.72	Q, SB
4	A	Jessica Cosby	United States	72.21			72.21	Q, PB
5	B	Tatyana Lysenko	Russia	70.16	x	71.73	71.73	q
6	A	Stéphanie Falzon	France	70.35	x	71.54	71.54	q
7	B	Martina Hrašnová	Slovakia	x	70.97	71.50	71.50	q
8	B	Sultana Frizell	Canada	67.53	70.98	69.33	70.98	q
9	B	Manuela Montebrun	France	68.65	62.49	70.66	70.66	q
10	B	Amber Campbell	United States	68.48	70.54	69.95	70.54	q
11	B	Kathrin Klaas	Germany	70.53	68.82	x	70.53	q
12	B	Clarissa Claretti	Italy	68.99	69.93	70.01	70.01	q
13	A	Aksana Miankova	Belarus	x	67.47	69.58	69.58	
14	B	Éva Orbán	Hungary	67.57	67.57	69.39	69.39	
15	B	Darya Pchelnik	Belarus	69.14	67.61	69.30	69.30	
16	B	Arasay Thondike	Cuba	x	x	68.97	68.97	
17	A	Jennifer Dahlgren	Argentina	68.90	65.42	64.56	68.90	
18	A	Silvia Salis	Italy	68.55	67.46	64.36	68.55	
19	A	Bianca Perie	Romania	67.74	68.47	62.67	68.47	
20	B	Merja Korpela	Finland	66.89	68.34	68.02	68.34	
21	A	Stiliani Papadopoulou	Greece	x	67.33	x	67.33	
22	A	Berta Castells	Spain	67.32	x	x	67.32	
23	A	Jennifer Joyce	Canada	x	66.59	67.07	67.07	
24	A	Andrea Bunjes	Germany	67.01	x	-	67.01	
25	B	Erin Gilreath	United States	65.64	66.72	66.25	66.72	
26	B	Zalina Marghieva	Moldova	66.70	x	62.56	66.70	
27	A	Iryna Sekachova	Ukraine	x	66.69	66.26	66.69	
28	B	Alexandra Papageorgiou	Greece	66.33	x	62.78	66.33	
29	B	Nataliya Zolotukhina	Ukraine	65.95	64.88	65.71	65.95	
30	B	Rosa Rodríguez	Venezuela	65.88	65.39	60.27	65.88	
31	A	Johana Moreno	Colombia	65.05	64.35	x	65.05	
32	B	Iryna Novozhylova	Ukraine	62.98	x	64.90	64.90	
33	A	Marina Marghiev	Moldova	x	x	64.83	64.83	
34	B	Cecilia Nilsson	Sweden	61.00	63.77	63.31	63.77	
35	A	Eileen O'Keeffe	Ireland	63.20	x	x	63.20	
36	A	Lenka Ledvinová	Czech Republic	62.92	x	58.72	62.92	
37	A	Vânia Silva	Portugal	62.66	62.86	62.67	62.86	
38	A	Florence Ezeh	Togo	59.76	59.61	58.34	59.76	
39	A	Galina Mityaeva	Tajikistan	x	56.31	x	56.31	
	A	Paraskevi Theodorou	Cyprus	x	x	x	NM	
	B	Zoe Derham	Great Britain & N.I.	x	x	x	NM	

Key: NM = no mark (i.e. no valid result), Q = qualification by place in heat, q = qualification by overall place

=== Final ===
Rank	Athlete	Nationality	#1	#2	#3	#4	#5	#6	Result	Notes
1st place, gold medalist(s)	Anita Włodarczyk	Poland	74.86	77.96	-	-	-	x	77.96	WR
2nd place, silver medalist(s)	Betty Heidler	Germany	75.10	75.38	75.73	73.45	76.44	77.12	77.12	NR
3rd place, bronze medalist(s)	Martina Hrašnová	Slovakia	67.84	72.72	73.07	69.50	74.79	65.65	74.79	
4	Kathrin Klaas	Germany	72.02	x	74.23	66.28	x	x	74.23	PB
5	Zhang Wenxiu	China	69.42	72.57	x	71.80	70.83	71.03	72.57	
6	Tatyana Lysenko	Russia	72.22	x	71.36	x	71.51	70.16	72.22	
7	Jessica Cosby	United States	x	72.17	69.94	68.10	x	71.35	72.17	
8	Clarissa Claretti	Italy	71.56	69.42	70.97	70.91	70.24	x	71.56	
9	Stéphanie Falzon	France	71.40	70.80	x				71.40	
10	Sultana Frizell	Canada	69.63	70.88	68.47				70.88	
11	Amber Campbell	United States	64.62	70.08	x				70.08	
12	Manuela Montebrun	France	x	69.92	69.75				69.92	

Key: NR = National record, PB = Personal best, WR = World record

== See also ==
- 2009 Hammer Throw Year Ranking
