= Paraskevi Theodorou =

Cypriot hammer thrower (born 1986)

Personal information
- Nationality: Cyprus
- Born: 15 March 1986 (age 40) Limassol, Cyprus
- Height: 1.67 m (5 ft 5 1/2 in)
- Weight: 85 kg (187 lb) (2014)

Sport
- Sport: Athletics
- Event: Hammer throw

Achievements and titles
- Personal best: Hammer throw: 69.29 m (2009)

Paraskevi Theodorou (Greek: Παρασκευή Θεοδώρου; born March 15, 1986, in Limassol) is a Cypriot hammer thrower. Theodorou represented Cyprus at the 2008 Summer Olympics in Beijing, where she competed for the women's hammer throw. She performed the best throw of 61.00 metres on her second attempt, finishing forty-fourth overall in the qualifying rounds.

== Competition record ==
Year	Competition	Venue	Position	Notes
Representing Cyprus
2005	Games of the Small States of Europe	Andorra la Vella, Andorra	1st	53.09 m
2005	European Junior Championships	Kaunas, Lithuania	19th (q)	51.31 m
2006	Commonwealth Games	Melbourne, Australia	–	NM
2007	European U23 Championships	Debrecen, Hungary	11th	60.44 m
2007	Universiade	Bangkok, Thailand	17th (q)	57.45 m
2008	Olympic Games	Beijing, China	44th (q)	61.00 m
2009	Mediterranean Games	Pescara, Italy	8th	61.95 m
2009	Universiade	Belgrade, Serbia	16th (q)	60.43 m
2009	World Championships	Berlin, Germany	–	NM
2010	European Championships	Barcelona, Spain	21st (q)	60.16 m
2010	Commonwealth Games	Delhi, India	12th	59.55 m
2014	Commonwealth Games	Glasgow, United Kingdom	14th (q)	57.00 m
