= Inna Sayenko =

Ukrainian hammer thrower (born 1982)

Inna Oleksandrivna Sayenko (Ukrainian: Інна Олександрівна Саєнко; born 8 March 1982 in Mariupol, Donetsk) is a Ukrainian hammer thrower. Her personal best throw is 70.96 metres, achieved in July 2008 in Kyiv. She competed at the 2008 Olympic Games without reaching the final.

== Competition record ==
Year	Competition	Venue	Position	Notes
Representing Ukraine
2007	Universiade	Bangkok, Thailand	10th	62.05 m
2008	Olympic Games	Beijing, China	27th (q)	66.92 m
2009	Universiade	Belgrade, Serbia	10th	65.91 m
