= 2010 European Athletics Championships – Women's hammer throw =

Women's hammer throw at the European Athletics Championships

The women's hammer throw at the 2010 European Athletics Championships was held at the Estadi Olímpic Lluís Companys on 28 and 30 July.

== Medalists ==
Gold	Betty Heidler; Germany (GER)
Silver	Tatyana Lysenko; Russia (RUS)
Bronze	Anita Włodarczyk; Poland (POL)

== Records ==
Standing records prior to the 2010 European Athletics Championships
World record	Anita Włodarczyk (POL)	78.30	Bydgoszcz, Poland	6 June 2010
European record	Anita Włodarczyk (POL)	78.30	Bydgoszcz, Poland	6 June 2010
Championship record	Tatyana Lysenko (RUS)	76.67	Gothenburg, Sweden	8 August 2006
World Leading	Anita Włodarczyk (POL)	78.30	Bydgoszcz, Poland	6 June 2010
European Leading	Anita Włodarczyk (POL)	78.30	Bydgoszcz, Poland	6 June 2010

== Schedule ==
Date	Time	Round
28 July 2010	10:10	Qualification
30 July 2010	20:20	Final

== Results ==
=== Qualification ===
Qualification: Qualification Performance 69.00 (Q) or at least 12 best performers advance to the final

Rank	Group	Athlete	Nationality	#1	#2	#3	Result	Notes
1	B	Tatyana Lysenko	Russia	x	72.36		72.36	Q
2	B	Betty Heidler	Germany	71.85			71.85	Q
3	A	Anita Włodarczyk	Poland	71.17			71.17	Q
4	A	Silvia Salis	Italy	70.33			70.33	Q
5	A	Nataliya Zolotuhina	Ukraine	63.76	65.79	69.31	69.31	Q
DQ	B	Zalina Marghieva	Moldova	~~69.22~~			~~69.22~~	Q, Doping
6	B	Bianca Perie	Romania	68.61	68.67	x	68.67	q
7	B	Éva Orbán	Hungary	64.55	68.59	—	68.59	q
8	A	Marina Marghieva	Moldova	x	67.47	67.84	67.84	q
9	B	Merja Korpela	Finland	66.06	67.58	66.45	67.58	q
10	B	Berta Castells	Spain	66.61	65.95	65.26	66.61	q
11	A	Tracey Andersson	Sweden	x	62.07	66.48	66.48	q
12	A	Mona Holm	Norway	62.72	66.10	66.18	66.18	
13	A	Alexándra Papayeoryíou	Greece	65.12	65.70	65.88	65.88	
14	A	Kathrin Klaas	Germany	65.82	65.49	x	65.82	
15	B	Małgorzata Zadura	Poland	62.26	65.45	64.78	65.45	
16	B	Stéphanie Falzon	France	64.30	x	64.34	64.34	
17	A	Volha Tsander	Belarus	x	62.69	x	62.69	
18	B	Kateřina Šafránková	Czech Republic	x	62.63	x	62.63	
19	A	Lenka Ledvinová	Czech Republic	x	x	60.74	60.74	
20	B	Paraskevi Theodorou	Cyprus	57.50	59.68	60.16	60.16	
	A	Daryia Pchelnik	Belarus	x	x	x	NM	Doping

=== Final ===
Rank	Athlete	Nationality	#1	#2	#3	#4	#5	#6	Result	Notes
1st place, gold medalist(s)	Betty Heidler	Germany	69.68	75.92	x	72.58	76.38	72.27	76.38	SB
2nd place, silver medalist(s)	Tatyana Lysenko	Russia	74.63	71.53	73.16	75.65	74.89	x	75.65	
3rd place, bronze medalist(s)	Anita Włodarczyk	Poland	73.05	73.34	x	72.65	70.58	73.56	73.56	
4	Bianca Perie	Romania	69.92	71.62	70.01	70.01	x	x	71.62	
	Zalina Marghieva	Moldova	~~69.43~~	~~70.83~~	~~68.11~~	x	~~69.04~~	~~68.59~~	~~70.83~~	Doping
6	Marina Marghieva	Moldova	x	67.02	70.77	63.82	x	66.93	70.77	
7	Silvia Salis	Italy	66.98	68.85	x	x	68.35	67.51	68.85	
8	Merja Korpela	Finland	68.21	67.15	66.20	x	x	63.96	68.21	
9	Berta Castells	Spain	68.20	66.07	x				68.20	
10	Nataliya Zolotuhina	Ukraine	x	67.53	66.99				67.53	
11	Tracey Andersson	Sweden	x	65.13	x				65.13	
12	Éva Orbán	Hungary	x	64.99	30.58				64.99	
