= 2007 European Athletics U23 Championships – Women's hammer throw =

The women's hammer throw event at the 2007 European Athletics U23 Championships was held in Debrecen, Hungary, at Gyulai István Atlétikai Stadion on 13 and 14 July.

== Medalists ==
Gold	Mariya Smaliachkova; Belarus
Silver	Lenka Ledvinová; Czech Republic
Bronze	Nataliya Zolotuhina; Ukraine

== Results ==
=== Final ===
14 July

Rank	Name	Nationality	Attempts						Result	Notes
Rank	Name	Nationality	1	2	3	4	5	6	Result	Notes
1st place, gold medalist(s)	Mariya Smaliachkova	Belarus	69.34	69.16	x	67.03	x	65.56	69.34	
2nd place, silver medalist(s)	Lenka Ledvinová	Czech Republic	65.43	67.37	67.63	67.20	66.54	63.17	67.63	
3rd place, bronze medalist(s)	Nataliya Zolotuhina	Ukraine	66.15	65.05	66.92	64.74	67.00	65.93	67.00	
4	Silvia Salis	Italy	64.92	x	63.13	64.23	62.10	x	64.92	
5	Noémi Németh	Hungary	x	61.31	62.96	61.59	64.59	60.70	64.59	
6	Malwina Sobierajska	Poland	63.92	64.25	x	61.51	x	64.01	64.25	
7	Iryna Novozhylova	Ukraine	64.08	63.59	58.77	60.54	57.87	54.68	64.08	
8	Laura Gibilisco	Italy	x	60.98	63.00	63.15	63.19	x	63.19	
9	Anita Włodarczyk	Poland	59.09	60.17	62.11				62.11	
10	Annika Nurminen	Finland	x	60.50	x				60.50	
11	Paraskevi Theodorou	Cyprus	60.44	60.11	x				60.44	
12	Vanda Nickl	Hungary	x	59.26	x				59.26	

=== Qualifications ===
13 July
Qualifying 63.00 or 12 best to the Final

==== Group A ====
Rank	Name	Nationality	Result	Notes
1	Mariya Smaliachkova	Belarus	67.87	Q
2	Silvia Salis	Italy	63.98	Q
3	Iryna Novozhylova	Ukraine	63.89	Q
4	Malwina Sobierajska	Poland	63.34	Q
5	Annika Nurminen	Finland	62.95	q
6	Paraskevi Theodorou	Cyprus	62.79	q
7	Vanda Nickl	Hungary	62.49	q
8	Ana Sušec	Slovenia	59.47	
9	Annika Hjelm	Sweden	55.81	

==== Group B ====
Rank	Name	Nationality	Result	Notes
1	Nataliya Zolotuhina	Ukraine	65.62	Q
2	Lenka Ledvinová	Czech Republic	65.04	Q
3	Laura Gibilisco	Italy	64.08	Q
4	Anita Włodarczyk	Poland	63.74	Q
5	Noémi Németh	Hungary	62.90	q
6	Lena Solvin	Finland	62.37	
7	Marina Marghiev	Moldova	57.95	
8	Amy Sène	France	57.85	
9	Josefin Berg	Sweden	56.53	
10	Alicja Filipkowska	Poland	54.60	

== Participation ==
According to an unofficial count, 19 athletes from 12 countries participated in the event.

- Belarus (1)
- Cyprus (1)
- Czech Republic (1)
- Finland (2)
- France (1)
- Hungary (2)
- Italy (2)
- Moldova (1)
- Poland (3)
- Slovenia (1)
- Sweden (2)
- Ukraine (2)
