= Women's hammer throw world record progression =

The first world record in the hammer throw for women (athletics) was recognised by the International Association of Athletics Federations in 1994.

Up to today, the IAAF has ratified 25 world records in the event.

== Record Progression ==
Mark	Athlete	Date	Location	Ref.
66.84 m (219 ft 3 in)	Olga Kuzenkova (RUS)	23 February 1994	Adler, Russia	
66.86 m (219 ft 4 in)	Mihaela Melinte (ROM)	4 March 1995	Bucharest, Romania	
67.00 m (219 ft 9 in)	Olga Kuzenkova (RUS)	24 May 1995	Moscow, Russia	
68.14 m (223 ft 6 in)	Olga Kuzenkova (RUS)	5 June 1995	Moscow, Russia	
68.16 m (223 ft 7 in)	Olga Kuzenkova (RUS)	18 June 1995	Moscow, Russia	
69.42 m (227 ft 9 in)	Mihaela Melinte (ROM)	12 May 1996	Bucharest, Romania	
69.58 m (228 ft 3 in)	Mihaela Melinte (ROM)	8 March 1997	Bucharest, Romania	
71.22 m (233 ft 7 in)	Olga Kuzenkova (RUS)	22 June 1997	Munich, Germany	
73.10 m (239 ft 9 in)	Olga Kuzenkova (RUS)	22 June 1997	Munich, Germany	
73.14 m (239 ft 11 in)	Mihaela Melinte (ROM)	16 July 1998	Poiana Brasov, Romania	
75.29 m (247 ft 0 in)	Mihaela Melinte (ROM)	13 May 1999	Clermont-Ferrand, France	
75.97 m (249 ft 2 in)	Mihaela Melinte (ROM)	13 May 1999	Clermont-Ferrand, France	
76.05 m (249 ft 6 in)	Mihaela Melinte (ROM)	29 August 1999	Rüdlingen, Switzerland	
76.07 m (249 ft 6 in)	Mihaela Melinte (ROM)	29 August 1999	Rüdlingen, Switzerland	
77.06 m (252 ft 9 in)	Tatyana Lysenko (RUS)	15 July 2005	Moscow, Russia	
77.26 m (253 ft 5 in)	Gulfiya Khanafeyeva (RUS)	12 June 2006	Tula, Russia	
77.41 m (253 ft 11 in)	Tatyana Lysenko (RUS)	24 June 2006	Zhukovsky, Russia	
77.80 m (255 ft 2 in)	Tatyana Lysenko (RUS)	15 August 2006	Tallinn, Estonia	
77.96 m (255 ft 9 in)	Anita Włodarczyk (POL)	22 August 2009	Berlin, Germany	
78.30 m (256 ft 10 in)	Anita Włodarczyk (POL)	6 June 2010	Bydgoszcz, Poland	
79.42 m (260 ft 6 in)	Betty Heidler (GER)	21 May 2011	Halle/Saale, Germany	
79.58 m (261 ft 1 in)	Anita Włodarczyk (POL)	31 August 2014	Berlin, Germany	
81.08 m (266 ft 0 in)	Anita Włodarczyk (POL)	1 August 2015	Władysławowo, Poland	
82.29 m (269 ft 11 in)	Anita Włodarczyk (POL)	15 August 2016	Rio de Janeiro, Brazil	
82.98 m (272 ft 2 in)	Anita Włodarczyk (POL)	28 August 2016	Warsaw, Poland	

== See also ==
- Men's hammer throw world record progression
