= Athletics at the 2005 Summer Universiade – Women's hammer throw =

The women's hammer throw event at the 2005 Summer Universiade was held on 15–16 August in İzmir, Turkey.

== Medalists ==
Gold	Silver	Bronze
Kamila Skolimowska; Poland	Liu Yinghui; China	Ester Balassini; Italy

== Results ==
=== Qualification ===
Rank	Group	Athlete	Nationality	Result	Notes
1	A	Kamila Skolimowska	Poland	68.42	Q
2	B	Liu Yinghui	China	68.05	Q
3	A	Aksana Miankova	Belarus	67.77	Q
4	B	Ester Balassini	Italy	66.25	Q
5	B	Berta Castells	Spain	66.20	Q
6	B	Gulfiya Khanafeyeva	Russia	66.03	Q
7	A	Clarissa Claretti	Italy	65.20	Q
8	A	Susanne Keil	Germany	64.83	Q
9	B	Darya Pchelnik	Belarus	63.01	Q
10	A	Zoe Derham	Great Britain	62.54	q
11	A	María José Conde	Portugal	62.47	q
12	A	Eileen O'Keeffe	Ireland	61.28	q
13	B	Lucie Vrbenská	Czech Republic	59.84	
14	B	Odette Palma	Chile	59.61	
15	A	Sultana Frizell	Canada	59.03	
16	B	Zübeyde Yıldız	Turkey	58.20	
17	B	Vânia Silva	Portugal	57.01	
18	B	Crystal Smith	Canada	56.53	
19	A	Vanessa Steen Mortensen	Denmark	52.30	
20	B	Malvina Zaporojan	Moldova	52.02	
21	A	Anastasiya Saznyeva	Kazakhstan	51.02	
22	B	Leung Yee Mei	Hong Kong	48.68	NR
23	?	Arvisa Aliaj	Albania	48.49	
24	?	Rose Herlinda	Indonesia	46.31	
25	?	Rukshona Aslitdinova	Tajikistan	38.34	
	A	Yelena Priyma	Russia	NM	
	B	Yipsi Moreno	Cuba	NM	

=== Final ===
Rank	Athlete	Nationality	#1	#2	#3	#4	#5	#6	Result	Notes
1st place, gold medalist(s)	Kamila Skolimowska	Poland	69.88	68.81	x	67.25	67.79	72.75	72.75	
2nd place, silver medalist(s)	Liu Yinghui	China	65.35	69.85	72.19	x	72.04	72.51	72.51	PB
3rd place, bronze medalist(s)	Ester Balassini	Italy	x	65.91	69.53	x	69.94	70.13	70.13	
4	Clarissa Claretti	Italy	65.92	64.76	63.07	67.57	69.35	66.52	69.35	
5	Aksana Miankova	Belarus	66.67	x	66.85	68.37	69.09	66.08	69.09	
6	Eileen O'Keeffe	Ireland	65.02	64.02	67.61	66.25	x	67.08	67.61	
7	Susanne Keil	Germany	63.82	67.22	x	x	67.50	x	67.50	
8	Gulfiya Khanafeyeva	Russia	64.95	65.90	x	67.17	67.05	66.14	67.17	
9	Berta Castells	Spain	63.42	61.94	64.00				64.00	
10	Darya Pchelnik	Belarus	x	63.89	63.00				63.89	
11	Zoe Derham	Great Britain	61.72	x	62.54				62.54	
12	María José Conde	Portugal	62.02	x	60.24				62.02	
