= Darya Pchelnik =

Belarusian hammer thrower

Personal information
- Native name: Дарья Пчельник (Russian); Дар'я Пчэльнік (Belarusian)
- Nationality: Belarusian
- Born: Darya Vladimirovna Pchelnik Grodno, Byelorussian SSR, Soviet Union
- Height: 186 cm (6 ft 1 in)
- Weight: 91 kg (201 lb)

Sport
- Country: Belarus
- Sport: Athletics
- Event: Hammer throw
- Club: Dynamo Hrodna
- Coached by: Igor Tsitsorin

Achievements and titles
- Personal best: 76.33 m (2008)
Medal record
Women's athletics
Representing Belarus
Universiade
Gold medal – first place	2007 Bangkok	Hammer throw

Darya Vladimirovna Pchelnik (also Daria or Dariya, Russian: Дарья Владимировна Пчельник, romanized: Darʹya Vladimirovna Pchelʹnik; Belarusian: Дар'я Уладзіміраўна Пчэльнік, romanized: Darja Uladzimiraŭna Pčeĺnik; born 20 December 1980 or 20 December 1981), is a Belarusian hammer thrower. Her personal best is 76.33 metres, achieved in June 2008 in Minsk.

Pchelnik was born in Grodno in the Byelorussian Soviet Socialist Republic of the Soviet Union. She first tried the hammer throw at age 18 under the coaching of Igor Tsitsorin and quickly committed to the event. She finished tenth at the 2005 Summer Universiade, won the 2007 Summer Universiade and finished fourth at the 2008 Olympic Games. In addition she competed at the 2005 World Championships without reaching the final. She had a strong start to the 2010 season after throwing 75.42 m to win at the Grande Prêmio Caixa Governo do Pará in May.

In 2016, Pchelnik's stored urine samples from the 2008 Olympic Games underwent re-analysis, which resulted in a positive test for the prohibited substance turinabol, an anabolic–androgenic steroid. On 10 January 2017, Pchelnik was officially disqualified from the 2008 Olympic Games due to doping violations. Her fourth place result was annulled and the diploma she obtained in the event was withdrawn.

== Achievements ==
Year	Competition	Venue	Position	Notes
2005	World Championships	Helsinki, Finland	15th (q)	65.54 m
2005	Universiade	İzmir, Turkey	10th	63.89 m
2007	Universiade	Bangkok, Thailand	1st	68.74 m
2008	Olympic Games	Beijing, China	DSQ	73.65 m
2009	World Championships	Berlin, Germany	DSQ	69.30 m
2009	World Athletics Final	Thessaloniki, Greece	DSQ	69.00 m
2010	European Championships	Barcelona, Spain	DSQ	NM
