= Athletics at the 2007 Summer Universiade – Women's hammer throw =

The women's hammer throw event at the 2007 Summer Universiade was held on 10 August.

== Results ==
Rank	Athlete	Nationality	#1	#2	#3	#4	#5	$6	Result	Notes
1st place, gold medalist(s)	Darya Pchelnik	Belarus	x	66.89	68.74	65.44	67.18	x	68.74	
2nd place, silver medalist(s)	Eileen O'Keeffe	Ireland	67.97	x	61.95	68.46	67.27	65.04	68.46	
3rd place, bronze medalist(s)	Lenka Ledvinová	Czech Republic	65.23	65.66	64.27	x	64.40	66.41	66.41	
4	Lætitia Bambara	France	64.08	65.34	x	61.27	59.98	x	65.34	
5	Martina Danišová	Slovakia	x	62.56	62.43	64.95	62.47	64.68	64.95	
6	Anna Bulgakova	Russia	62.82	62.31	63.04	x	64.83	61.19	64.83	
7	Maryia Smaliachkova	Belarus	x	64.53	x	x	62.26	x	64.53	
8	Vanda Nickl	Hungary	62.01	62.77	61.59	62.38	63.20	x	63.20	
9	Silvia Salis	Italy	60.72	61.99	62.18				62.18	
10	Inna Sayenko	Ukraine	x	62.05	x				62.05	
11	Katarzyna Kita	Poland	x	60.43	59.21				60.43	
12	Éva Orbán	Hungary	58.11	x	60.19				60.19	
13	Laura Gibilisco	Italy	59.85	58.91	x				59.85	
14	Zoe Derham	Great Britain	x	59.14	x				59.14	
15	Marina Marghiev	Moldova	56.04	58.66	x				58.66	
16	Gu Yuan	China	56.07	56.93	58.03				58.03	
17	Paraskevi Theodorou	Cyprus	56.01	57.45	x				57.45	
18	Ana Sušec	Slovenia	56.10	54.33	55.46				56.10	
19	Oksana Kondratyeva	Russia	53.66	x	53.93				53.93	
20	Arvisa Aliaj	Albania	x	41.49	x				41.49	
21	Sawae Atit	Thailand	38.20	37.48	x				38.20	SB
22	Siwaporn Warapiang	Thailand	x	33.31	35.17				35.17	
