= Éva Orbán =

Hungarian hammer thrower

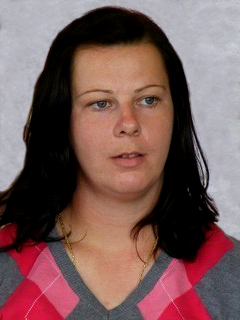

Personal information
- Full name: Éva Orbán
- Nationality: Hungarian
- Born: 29 November 1984 (age 41) Pápa, Hungary
- Height: 1.73 m (5 ft 8 in)
- Weight: 75 kg (165 lb)

Sport
- Sport: Hammer throw

Achievements and titles
- Personal best: 73.44 m
Medal record
Representing Hungary
Summer Universiade
Silver medal – second place	2011 Shenzhen	Hammer throw

Éva Orbán (born 29 November 1984 in Pápa) is a Hungarian hammer thrower. She set her personal best and a Hungarian national record with a throw of 71.33 metres on the 2011 Summer Universiade in Shenzhen, with that she won the silver medal of the event.

Representing the USC Trojans track and field team, Orbán won the 2008 NCAA Division I Outdoor Track and Field Championships in the hammer throw.

== Achievements ==
Year	Competition	Venue	Position	Notes
Representing Hungary
2002	World Junior Championships	Kingston, Jamaica	—	NM
2003	European Junior Championships	Tampere, Finland	6th	62.33 m
2004	Olympic Games	Athens, Greece	24th (q)	65.76 m
2005	European U23 Championships	Erfurt, Germany	11th	57.26 m
2005	World Championships	Helsinki, Finland	21st (q)	64.26 m
2006	European Championships	Gothenburg, Sweden	25th (q)	62.55 m
2007	Universiade	Bangkok, Thailand	12th	60.19 m
2008	Olympic Games	Beijing, PR China	34th (q)	65.41 m
2009	World Championships	Berlin, Germany	14th (q)	69.39 m
2010	European Championships	Barcelona, Spain	12th	64.99 m
2011	Universiade	Shenzhen, China	2nd	71.33 m
2011	World Championships	Daegu, South Korea	13th (q)	68.89 m
2012	European Championships	Helsinki, Finland	7th	67.92 m
2012	Olympic Games	London, United Kingdom	17th (q)	68.64 m
2013	World Championships	Moscow, Russia	8th	72.70 m
2014	European Championships	Zürich, Switzerland	–	NM
2015	World Championships	Beijing, China	28th (q)	64.57 m
2016	European Championships	Amsterdam, Netherlands	18th (q)	65.86 m
2018	European Championships	Berlin, Germany	28th (q)	59.16 m

== Awards ==
- Hungarian athlete of the Year (3): 2011, 2012, 2013
