= Athletics at the 2009 Summer Universiade – Women's hammer throw =

The women's hammer throw event at the 2009 Summer Universiade was held on 8–10 July.

== Medalists ==
Gold	Silver	Bronze
Betty Heidler; Germany	Martina Hrašnová; Slovakia	Kathrin Klaas; Germany

== Results ==
=== Qualification ===
Qualification: 63.00 m (Q) or at least 12 best (q) qualified for the final.

Rank	Group	Athlete	Nationality	#1	#2	#3	Result	Notes
1	B	Betty Heidler	Germany	73.75			73.75	Q
2	A	Kathrin Klaas	Germany	69.19			69.19	Q
3	B	Maryia Smaliachkova	Belarus	x	68.56		68.56	Q
4	A	Eileen O'Keeffe	Ireland	68.08			68.08	Q
5	A	Silvia Salis	Italy	66.66			66.66	Q
6	A	Martina Hrašnová	Slovakia	66.22			66.22	Q
7	A	Merja Korpela	Finland	x	65.98		65.98	Q
8	B	Zalina Marghieva	Moldova	65.92			65.92	Q
9	A	Lenka Ledvinová	Czech Republic	64.41			64.41	Q
9	A	Marina Marghiev	Moldova	64.41			64.41	Q
11	B	Małgorzata Zadura	Poland	x	x	63.98	63.98	Q
12	B	Oksana Kondratyeva	Russia	61.86	63.87		63.87	Q
13	A	Inna Sayenko	Ukraine	x	63.44		63.44	Q
14	B	Bianca Perie	Romania	63.30			63.30	Q
15	B	Lena Solvin	Finland	57.91	61.46	60.02	61.46	
16	B	Paraskevi Theodorou	Cyprus	58.17	x	60.43	60.43	
17	B	Elisa Palmieri	Italy	60.43	x	x	60.43	PB
18	A	Aleksandra Lushcheko	Russia	57.86	59.86	x	59.86	
19	B	Nikola Lomnická	Slovakia	59.33	56.88	x	59.33	

=== Final ===
Rank	Athlete	Nationality	#1	#2	#3	#4	#5	#6	Result	Notes
1st place, gold medalist(s)	Betty Heidler	Germany	75.83	73.18	x	71.65	70.99	70.77	75.83	GR
2nd place, silver medalist(s)	Martina Hrašnová	Slovakia	59.46	72.85	x	71.84	x	70.62	72.85	
3rd place, bronze medalist(s)	Kathrin Klaas	Germany	68.72	70.97	x	70.25	x	x	70.97	
4	Merja Korpela	Finland	69.56	x	x	66.22	64.05	65.76	69.56	PB
5	Silvia Salis	Italy	68.74	67.70	67.18	x	66.85	66.84	68.74	
6	Bianca Perie	Romania	67.62	x	x	68.00	68.16	x	68.16	
7	Marina Marghiev	Moldova	68.10	66.03	67.21	x	66.84	x	68.10	
8	Zalina Marghieva	Moldova	64.23	67.05	x	64.40	x	x	67.05	
9	Eileen O'Keeffe	Ireland	66.97	66.46	x				66.97	
10	Inna Sayenko	Ukraine	65.08	65.91	65.72				65.91	
11	Lenka Ledvinová	Czech Republic	63.41	65.53	x				65.53	
12	Maryia Smaliachkova	Belarus	x	65.08	x				65.08	
13	Oksana Kondratyeva	Russia	63.60	63.98	x				63.98	
	Małgorzata Zadura	Poland	x	x	x				NM	
