= Eileen O'Keeffe =

Irish hammer thrower

Eileen O'Keeffe (born 31 May 1981) is an Irish former hammer thrower. Her personal best throw of 73.21 metres, achieved in July 2007 at the national championships in Dublin, is the Irish record for the event. Over her career, she represented Ireland at the 2008 Beijing Olympics, competed three times at the World Championships in Athletics (2005, 2007, 2009), and took part in the European Athletics Championships on two occasions. She won nine consecutive national hammer titles and also six titles in the discus throw.

She finished fourth at the 2003 Summer Universiade, sixth at the 2005 Summer Universiade, won the silver medal at the 2007 Summer Universiade and finished sixth at the 2007 World Championships. She also competed at the 2002 European Championships, the 2005 World Championships, the 2006 European Championships and the 2008 Olympic Games without reaching the final.

In a January 2008 interview on RTÉ's The Panel, O'Keeffe said that she learned the sport from a Hal Connolly DVD her brother bought from a pound shop.

She retired from competition in 2011 at the age of 29, having failed to return to form following a serious knee injury.

== Competition record ==
Year	Competition	Venue	Position	Notes
Representing Ireland
2000	World Junior Championships	Santiago, Chile	26th (q)	50.13 m
2001	European U23 Championships	Amsterdam, Netherlands	17th (q)	57.08 m
2002	European Championships	Munich, Germany	30th (q)	59.64 m
2003	European U23 Championships	Bydgoszcz, Poland	15th (q)	59.64 m
2003	Universiade	Daegu, South Korea	4th	62.96 m
2005	World Championships	Helsinki, Finland	24th (q)	64.09 m
2005	Universiade	İzmir, Turkey	6th	67.61 m
2006	European Championships	Gothenburg, Sweden	17th (q)	65.07 m
2007	Universiade	Bangkok, Thailand	2nd	68.46 m
2007	World Championships	Osaka, Japan	6th	70.93 m
2008	Olympic Games	Beijing, China	23rd (q)	67.66 m
2009	Universiade	Belgrade, Serbia	9th	66.97 m
2009	World Championships	Berlin, Germany	35th (q)	63.20 m
