= Arasay Thondike =

Cuban hammer thrower

Personal information
- Full name: Arasay María Thondike Santovenia
- Born: May 28, 1986 (age 40) Sagua La Grande, Villa Clara
- Height: 1.68 m (5 ft 6 in)
- Weight: 71 kg (157 lb)

Sport
- Country: Cuba
- Sport: Athletics
- Event: Hammer throw
Medal record
Pan American Games
Silver medal – second place	2007 Rio de Janeiro	Hammer throw
- Updated on 27 June 2013

Arasay María Thondike Santovenia (also spelled Thondique or Tondike; born 28 May 1986 in Sagua La Grande, Villa Clara) is a female hammer thrower from Cuba. She set a personal best throw of 71.14 metres in June 2007 in Warsaw. This personal best stood for two years until she significantly improved upon it with a throw of 71.72 m at the Barrientos Memorial in Cuba.

== Biography ==
She finished seventh at the 2003 World Youth Championships, won the silver medal at the 2007 Pan American Games, finished ninth at the 2007 World Championships and fifth at the 2007 World Athletics Final. She also competed at the 2008 Olympic Games without reaching the final.

== Personal best ==
- Hammer throw: 73.90 m – (Cuba) La Habana, 18 July 2009

== Achievements ==
Year	Competition	Venue	Position	Event	Notes
Representing Cuba
2003	World Youth Championships	Sherbrooke, Canada	7th	Hammer	54.43 m
2005	ALBA Games	La Habana, Cuba	1st	Hammer	63.30 m
2005	Central American and Caribbean Championships	Nassau, Bahamas	4th	Hammer	60.49 m
2005	Pan American Junior Championships	Windsor, Canada	1st	Hammer	64.80 m
2006	NACAC U23 Championships	Santo Domingo, Dominican Republic	2nd	Hammer	66.28 m
2007	Pan American Games	Rio de Janeiro, Brazil	2nd	Hammer	68.70 m
2007	World Championships	Osaka, Japan	9th	Hammer	70.20 m
2008	Olympic Games	Beijing, China	15th (q)	Hammer	68.74 m
2009	ALBA Games	La Habana, Cuba	2nd	Hammer	68.89 m
2009	Central American and Caribbean Championships	Havana, Cuba	1st	Hammer	71.32 m
2009	World Championships	Berlin, Germany	16th (q)	Hammer	69.97 m
2011	Pan American Games	Guadalajara, Mexico	4th	Hammer	68.88 m
2012	Olympic Games	London, United Kingdom	23rd (q)	Hammer	67.93 m
