= Clarissa Claretti =

Italian hammer thrower (born 1980)

Personal information
- Born: 7 October 1980 (age 45) Fermo, Italy
- Height: 1.70 m (5 ft 7 in)
- Weight: 70 kg (154 lb)

Sport
- Country: Italy
- Sport: Athletics
- Event: Hammer throw
- Club: C.S. Aeronautica Militare
- Retired: 2010

Achievements and titles
- Personal best: Hammer throw: 72.46 (2008)
Medal record
Mediterranean Games
Silver medal – second place	2005 Almeria	Hammer throw
Silver medal – second place	2009 Pescara	Hammer throw

Clarissa Claretti (born 7 October 1980) is an Italian former hammer thrower.

== Personal best ==
Her personal best throw is 72.46 metres, achieved in July 2008 in Cagliari.

== Achievements ==
Year	Competition	Venue	Position	Notes
Representing Italy
1999	European Junior Championships	Riga, Latvia	15th (q)	56.51 m
2001	European U23 Championships	Amsterdam, Netherlands	19th (q)	56.51 m
2002	European Championships	Munich, Germany	8th	66.25 m
2003	World Championships	Paris, France	27th (q)	62.19 m
2004	Olympic Games	Athens, Greece	28th (q)	65.06 m
2005	Mediterranean Games	Almería, Spain	2nd	69.24 m
2005	World Championships	Helsinki, Finland	9th	64.76 m
2005	Universiade	İzmir, Turkey	4th	69.35 m
2006	European Championships	Gothenburg, Sweden	7th	69.78 m
2006	World Athletics Final	Stuttgart, Germany	5th	66.87 m
2007	World Championships	Osaka, Japan	7th	70.74 m
2007	World Athletics Final	Stuttgart, Germany	3rd	70.34 m
2008	Olympic Games	Beijing, China	7th	71.33 m
2009	Mediterranean Games	Pescara, Italy	2nd	69.35 m
2009	World Championships	Berlin, Germany	8th	71.56 m
2009	World Athletics Final	Thessaloniki, Greece	2nd	70.56 m

== National titles ==
She has won 7 national championships at senior level.

- Italian Athletics Championships
  - Hammer throw: 2002, 2003, 2006, 2007, 2008, 2009
- Italian Winter Throwing Championships
  - Hammer throw: 2007
