= 2013 World Championships in Athletics – Women's hammer throw =

Sports competition

Women's hammer throw at the 2013 World Championships
- Venue: Luzhniki Stadium
- Dates: 14 August (qualification); 16 August (final)
- Competitors: 26 from 18 nations
- Winning distance: 78.80 m (258 ft 6 1/4 in)

Medalists
gold medal	Anita Włodarczyk; Poland
silver medal	Zhang Wenxiu; China
bronze medal	Wang Zheng; China

The women's hammer throw at the 2013 World Championships in Athletics was held at the Luzhniki Stadium on 14–16 August.

After feeling out the ring, there were six automatic qualifiers to the final, most making it on their second attempt. It took 70.47 to make the final. Among the non-qualifiers was the world record holder Betty Heidler.

In the final, Jeneva McCall's first attempt 72.33 held up through the first 9 throwers until Tatyana Lysenko let loose a 77.58. Zhang Wenxiu answered that with a 74.62 to move into second place. The second round got more serious with three more throwers over 74 meters, with Wang Zheng moving into second with a personal best 74.90. Lysenko had a second throw out over 77. In the third round, Anita Włodarczyk moved into the lead, her 77.79 tickling her own championship record from 2009, what was at the time the world record. Zhang moved past her teammate back into third with a 75.09. And after leading most of the first round, McCall's day was done. After the short break to rearrange the order, the fourth round was the decider. The five competitors all fouled consecutively, then Zhang shored up her third place with a 75.58. Next into the ring, Lysenko sent it out 78.80 a new championship record. And following her, Włodarczyk set a new Polish national record with her 78.46. In the final two rounds, nobody came within a meter of improving.

Performances in the World Championships contributed to the final scoring of the 2013 IAAF Hammer Throw Challenge – a first for the series.

== Records ==
Prior to the competition, the records were as follows:

World record	Betty Heidler (GER)	79.42	Halle, Germany	21 May 2011
Championship record	Anita Włodarczyk (POL)	77.96	Berlin, Germany	22 August 2009
World leading	Tatyana Lysenko (RUS)	78.24	Moscow, Russia	24 July 2013
African record	Amy Séné (SEN)	69.10	Angers, France	17 June 2012
Asian record	Zhang Wenxiu (CHN)	76.99	Ostrava, Czech Republic	24 May 2012
North, Central American and Caribbean record	Yipsi Moreno (CUB)	76.62	Zagreb, Croatia	9 September 2008
South American record	Jennifer Dahlgren (ARG)	73.74	Buenos Aires, Argentina	10 April 2010
European record	Betty Heidler (GER)	79.42	Halle, Germany	21 May 2011
Oceanian record	Bronwyn Eagles (AUS)	71.12	Adelaide, Australia	6 February 2003

== Qualification standards ==
A result	B result
72.00	69.50

== Schedule ==
Date	Time	Round
14 August 2013	9:30	Qualification
16 August 2013	19:00	Final

All times are local times (UTC+4)

== Results ==
KEY:	Q	Qualified	q	12 best performers	NR	National record	PB	Personal best	SB	Seasonal best

=== Qualification ===
Qualification: 73.00 m (Q) and at least 12 best (q) advanced to the final.

Rank	Group	Name	Nationality	No. 1	No. 2	No. 3	Mark	Notes
1	B	Anita Włodarczyk	Poland	x	76.18		76.18	Q
2	A	Zhang Wenxiu	China	71.99	75.15		75.15	Q, SB
DSQ	A	Anna Bulgakova	Russia	68.86	74.83		74.83	Q
DSQ	A	Tatyana Lysenko	Russia	x	74.60		74.60	Q
5	B	Oksana Kondrateva	Russia	73.89			73.89	Q
6	B	Wang Zheng	China	71.33	73.17		73.17	Q, PB
7	B	Gulfiya Khanafeyeva	Russia	69.67	69.62	72.47	72.47	q
8	B	Amanda Bingson	United States	71.90	x	x	71.90	q
9	B	Yipsi Moreno	Cuba	71.69	x	x	71.69	q
10	B	Bianca Perie	Romania	70.19	69.58	71.32	71.32	q, SB
11	A	Éva Orbán	Hungary	x	69.45	70.62	70.62	q
12	A	Jeneva McCall	United States	70.47	x	69.14	70.47	q
13	B	Amber Campbell	United States	69.86	66.92	67.40	69.86	
14	B	Liu Tingting	China	69.07	x	69.68	69.68	
15	A	Rosa Rodríguez	Venezuela	67.48	69.35	x	69.35	
16	A	Sultana Frizell	Canada	67.86	69.06	68.77	69.06	
17	A	Jennifer Dahlgren	Argentina	67.63	66.86	68.90	68.90	
18	A	Betty Heidler	Germany	68.83	66.41	x	68.83	
19	B	Sophie Hitchon	Great Britain & N.I.	68.56	67.62	65.86	68.56	
20	B	Kathrin Klaas	Germany	x	66.93	68.34	68.34	
21	A	Martina Hrašnová	Slovakia	x	x	68.00	68.00	
22	B	Aksana Miankova	Belarus	62.19	66.65	x	66.65	
23	B	Amy Sène	Senegal	x	64.96	65.58	65.58	SB
24	A	Tereza Králová	Czech Republic	63.68	x	64.74	64.74	
25	A	Barbara Špiler	Slovenia	x	x	64.58	64.58	
26	B	Tracey Andersson	Sweden	x	61.37	x	61.37	
	A	Iryna Syekachova	Ukraine				DNS	

=== Final ===
The final started at 19:00.

Rank	Name	Nationality	No. 1	No. 2	No. 3	No. 4	No. 5	No. 6	Mark	Notes
1st place, gold medalist(s)	Anita Włodarczyk	Poland	70.75	74.21	77.79	78.46	72.85	71.39	78.46	NR
2nd place, silver medalist(s)	Zhang Wenxiu	China	74.62	73.60	75.08	75.58	72.70	x	75.58	SB
3rd place, bronze medalist(s)	Wang Zheng	China	68.46	74.90	x	73.94	x	72.35	74.90	PB
5	Yipsi Moreno	Cuba	68.96	74.16	71.06	x	x	72.68	74.16	SB
6	Oksana Kondrateva	Russia	71.46	72.76	71.21	68.80	x	68.61	72.76	
7	Éva Orbán	Hungary	67.17	72.70	70.18	70.57	x	67.39	72.70	
8	Jeneva McCall	United States	72.33	72.61	72.65				72.65	
9	Amanda Bingson	United States	x	72.56	x				72.56	
10	Bianca Perie	Romania	71.15	70.40	71.25				71.25	
11	Gulfiya Khanafeyeva	Russia	71.07	69.52	69.00				71.07	
DSQ	Tatyana Lysenko	Russia	77.58	77.33	76.34	78.80	76.90	74.49	78.80	CR
DSQ	Anna Bulgakova	Russia	x	72.69	74.62	72.80	x	73.33	74.62	
