= Lenka Valešová =

Czech hammer thrower

Personal information
- Nationality: Czech
- Born: August 11, 1985 (age 40) Domažlice, Czechoslovakia

Sport
- Country: Czech Republic
- Sport: Track and field, weightlifting
- Event: Hammer thrower

Achievements and titles
- Personal best: 70.51 m (May 2009, Sušice)
Medal record
Women's athletics
European U23 Championships
Silver medal – second place	2007 Debrecen	Hammer throw
Universiade
Bronze medal – third place	2007 Bangkok	Hammer throw
- Updated on 1 September 2012

Lenka Valešová (née Ledvinová; born 11 August 1985) is a Czech hammer thrower. She has represented the Czech Republic at the Summer Olympics, World Athletics Championships, European Athletics Championships and twice at the Summer Universiade.

== Biography ==
Valešová was born on 11 August 1985 in Domažlice.

== Career ==
She finished sixth at the 2004 World Junior Championships and won the silver medal at the 2007 Summer Universiade. She also competed at the 2002 European Championships, the 2006 European Championships, the 2007 World Championships and the 2008 Olympic Games without reaching the final.

Ledvinová improved the Czech national record three times. Her personal best throw is 70.51 metres, achieved in May 2009 in Sušice. She was selected to represent her country at the 2009 World Championships in Athletics, and competed in qualifying only.

She switched sports to Olympic weightlifting in 2010 and won the national championship and set a national record in the clean and jerk for +90 kg category, with a lift of 96 kg. She fell to fifth place at the 2011 national championships. She returned her focus to athletics and won a fifth hammer throw title at the 2020 Czech Athletics Championships.

== Competition record ==
Representing Czech Republic
Year	Competition	Venue	Position	Notes
2002	World Junior Championships	Kingston, Jamaica	15th (q)	55.50 m
2002	European Championships	Munich, Germany	43rd (q)	47.65 m
2004	World Junior Championships	Grosseto, Italy	6th	60.18 m
2006	European Championships	Gothenburg, Sweden	32nd (q)	60.85 m
2007	European U23 Championships	Debrecen, Hungary	2nd	67.63 m
2007	World Championships	Osaka, Japan	21st (q)	66.57 m
2007	Universiade	Bangkok, Thailand	3rd	66.41 m
2008	Olympic Games	Beijing, China	26th (q)	67.17 m
2009	Universiade	Belgrade, Serbia	11th	65.53 m
2009	World Championships	Berlin, Germany	36th (q)	62.92 m
2010	European Championships	Barcelona, Spain	20th (q)	60.74 m

== National titles ==
- Czech Athletics Championships
  - Hammer throw: 2006, 2007, 2009, 2010, 2020

== See also ==
- List of Universiade medalists in athletics (women)
- List of Czech Athletics Championships winners
- Czech Republic at the 2008 Summer Olympics
- Czech Republic at the 2009 World Championships in Athletics
- Czech Republic at the 2010 European Athletics Championships
