= Betty Heidler =

German hammer thrower

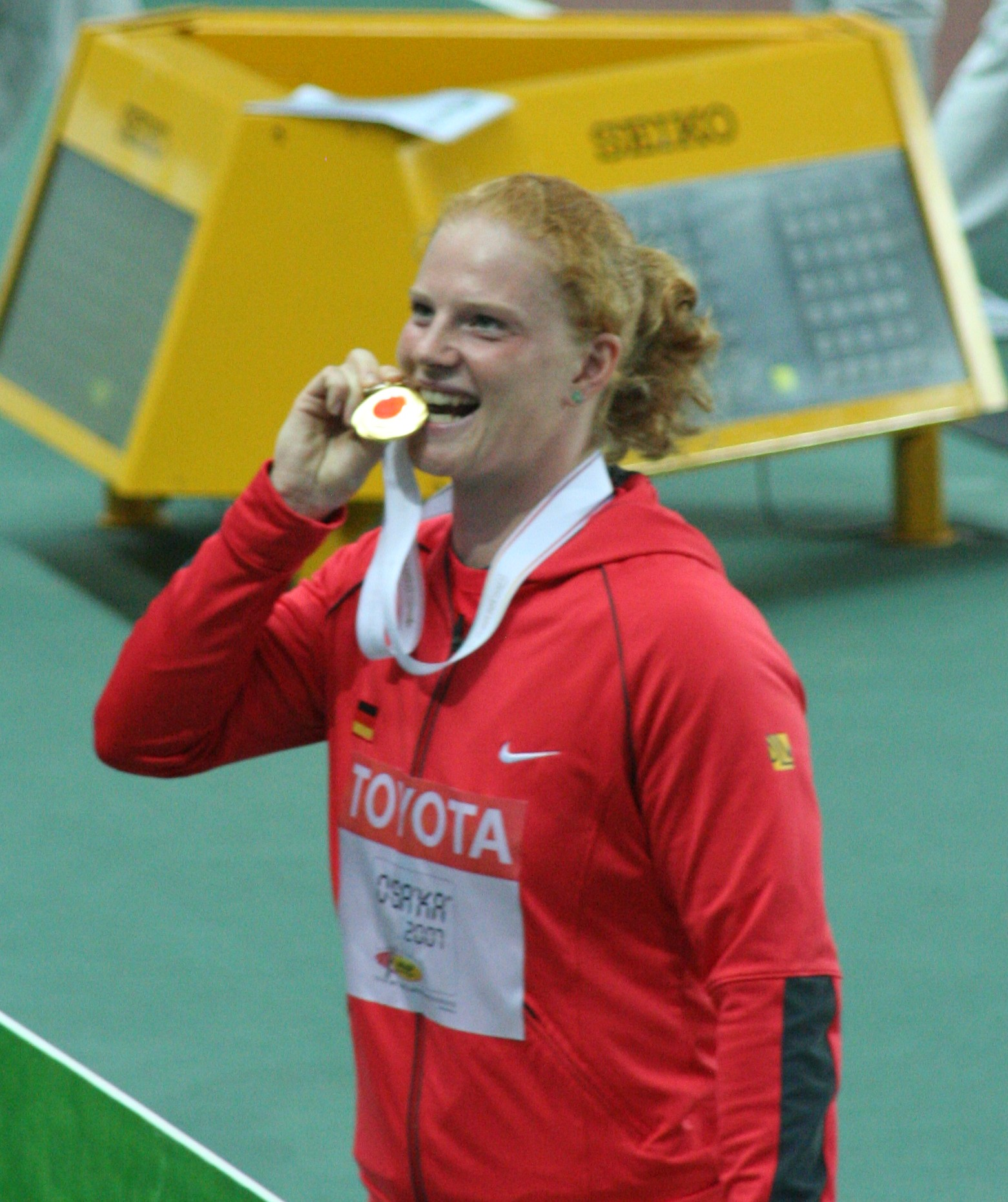
- Heidler at the 2007 World Championships

Personal information
- Nationality: German
- Born: October 14, 1983 (age 42) East Berlin, East Germany
- Education: University of Hagen (LLB)
- Height: 1.75 m (5 ft 9 in)
- Weight: 83 kg (183 lb)

Sport
- Country: Germany
- Sport: Athletics
- Event: Hammer throw
- Club: LG Eintracht Frankfurt
- Turned pro: 2004
- Coached by: Bernd Madler

Achievements and titles
- Olympic finals: 2012 Summer Olympics: Hammer throw – Silver
- World finals: 2007 Osaka: Hammer throw – Gold; 2009 Berlin: Hammer throw – Silver; 2011 Daegu: Hammer throw – Silver
- Regional finals: 2010 Barcelona: Hammer throw – Gold
- Personal best: Hammer throw: 79.42 (2011, WR)
Medal record
Women's athletics
Representing Germany
Olympic Games
Silver medal – second place	2012 London	Hammer throw
World Championships
Gold medal – first place	2007 Osaka	Hammer throw
Silver medal – second place	2009 Berlin	Hammer throw
Silver medal – second place	2011 Daegu	Hammer throw
European Championships
Gold medal – first place	2010 Barcelona	Hammer throw
Silver medal – second place	2016 Amsterdam	Hammer throw
Universiade
Gold medal – first place	2009 Belgrade	Hammer throw
- Updated on 13 August 2012

Betty Heidler (born 14 October 1983) is a retired German track and field athlete who competed in the hammer throw. She held the world record from 2011 until 2014 with her personal best throw of 79.42 m (260 ft 6 in). She is the 2012 Olympic silver medallist, the 2007 World champion and the 2009 and 2011 World Championship silver medallist. She also finished fourth in the Olympic finals in 2004 and 2016.

== Career ==
Heidler now lives in Frankfurt and is a member of the Eintracht Frankfurt athletics team. She works for the German Federal Police where she is a member of the sports support group and started studying Bachelor of Laws at the Fernuniversität Hagen in 2007.

She put in a dominant performance at the 2010 European Cup Winter Throwing with a winning mark of 72.48 m, beating her nearest rival by more than three metres.

Heidler won the inaugural IAAF Hammer Throw Challenge in 2010, finishing at the top of the rankings ahead of Anita Wlodarczyk. She won the gold medal at the 2010 European Athletics Championships then went on to take the silver medal at the 2011 World Championships in Athletics. In May 2011, in Halle, she achieved a new world record hammer throw, of 79.42 m. She began the 2012 season with a series of wins, performing at the Colorful Daegu Meeting, Golden Spike Ostrava, and Prefontaine Classic.

Heidler won a medal at the 2012 London Olympics. The event was not without controversy as the referees first failed to correctly measure Heidler's bronze-winning throw. She was later promoted to the silver medal position, after Tatyana Lysenko was disqualified for a doping violation in 2016 in reanalysis of her stored doping samples.

== Achievements ==
Year	Competition	Venue	Position	Notes
Representing Germany
2000	World Junior Championships	Santiago, Chile	19th (q)	52.18 m
2002	World Junior Championships	Kingston, Jamaica	17th (q)	53.82 m
2003	European U23 Championships	Bydgoszcz, Poland	4th	66.49 m
2003	World Championships	Paris, France	11th	65.81 m
2004	Olympic Games	Athens, Greece	4th	72.73 m
2004	World Athletics Final	Szombathely, Hungary	6th	69.65 m
2005	European U23 Championships	Erfurt, Germany	2nd	69.64 m
2005	World Championships	Helsinki, Finland	29th (q)	61.91 m
2005	World Athletics Final	Szombathely, Hungary	6th	69.95 m
2006	European Championships	Gothenburg, Sweden	5th	70.89 m
2006	World Athletics Final	Stuttgart, Germany	1st	75.44 m (CR)
2007	World Championships	Osaka, Japan	1st	74.76 m
2008	Olympic Games	Beijing, China	9th	70.06 m
2008	World Athletics Final	Stuttgart, Germany	5th	69.72 m
2009	Universiade	Belgrade, Serbia	1st	75.83 m (GR)
2009	World Championships	Berlin, Germany	2nd	77.12 m (NR)
2009	World Athletics Final	Thessaloniki, Greece	1st	72.03 m
2010	European Cup Winter Throwing	Arles, France	1st	72.48 m
2010	European Championships	Barcelona, Spain	1st	76.38 m
2011	World Championships	Daegu, South Korea	2nd	76.06 m
2012	European Championships	Helsinki, Finland	17th (q)	65.06 m
2012	Olympic Games	London, Great Britain	2nd	77.13 m
2013	World Championships	Moscow, Russia	18th (q)	68.83 m
2014	European Championships	Zürich, Switzerland	5th	72.39 m
2015	World Championships	Beijing, China	7th	72.56 m
2016	European Championships	Amsterdam, Netherlands	2nd	75.77 m
2016	Olympic Games	Rio de Janeiro, Brazil	4th	73.71 m

Records
Preceded by (Poland) Anita Włodarczyk	Women's Hammer World Record Holder; 21 May 2011 – August 31, 2014	Succeeded by (Poland) Anita Włodarczyk
