= Aksana Miankova =

Belarusian hammer thrower

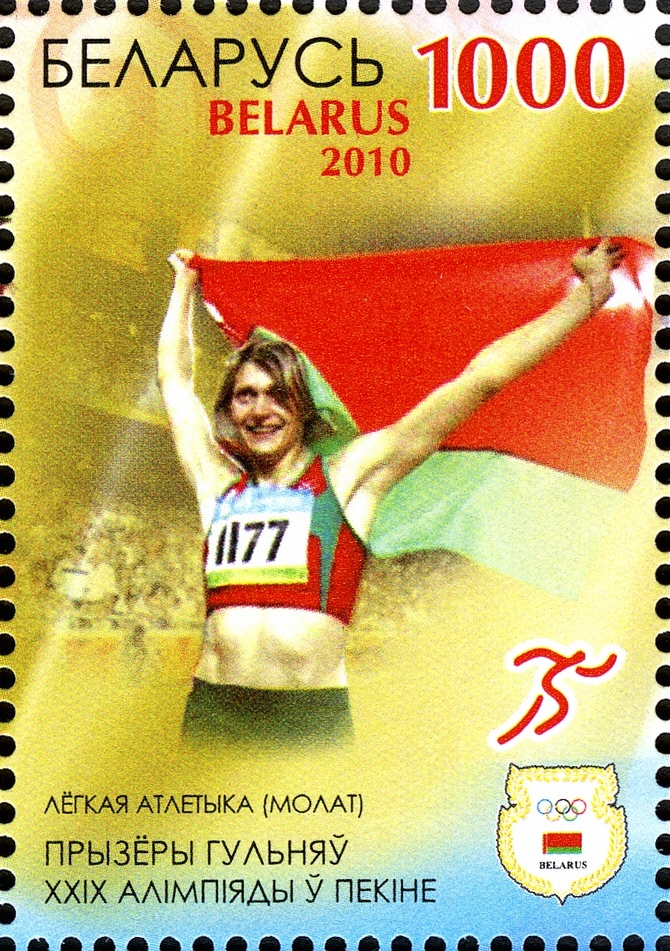
- Miankova 2010 on a Belarusian stamp

Personal information
- Nationality: Belarusian
- Born: 28 March 1982 (age 44) Krychaw, Byelorussian SSR, Soviet Union
- Height: 1.86 m (6 ft 1 in)
- Weight: 85 kg (187 lb)

Sport
- Country: Belarus
- Sport: Athletics
- Event: Hammer throw
- Club: RTsFVS Mahilyow

Achievements and titles
- Personal best: 79.12 m (2012)

Aksana Miankova, also transliterated as Oksana Menkova (Belarusian: Аксана Мянькова; born 28 March 1982), is a Belarusian former hammer thrower.

== Career ==
Miankova began learning the hammer throw in her late teens. Women's hammer competitions were still a developing sport at that point and she soon won a number of regional competitions. She competed in the qualifying rounds of the 2002 European Athletics Championships and, after a silver medal at the 2003 European Athletics U23 Championships, she represented Belarus at the 2003 World Championships in Athletics. Her health suffered in the winter months during this period, however, and her lack of training time hindered her performance in her early career.

She finished fifth at the 2005 Summer Universiade and took part in the 2007 World Championships without reaching the final.

Miankova originally won the gold medal at 2008 Beijing Olympics with a throw of 76.34 metres, an Olympic record. In 2016, she was stripped of her Olympic medal after a re-analysis of her drug sample tested positive.

On 25 November 2016 the IOC disqualified her from both the 2008 and 2012 Olympic Games and struck her results from the record for failing a drugs test in a re-analysis of her doping samples from 2008 and 2012.

She missed some of the 2010 season due to taking maternity leave from the sport. She gave birth to a daughter, Arina Menkova, in September that year and she vowed to return to top form in 2011.

Miankova had a personal best throw of 78.19 metres in April 2012 in Brest. This was the third longest throw by a woman. She equalled this feat at the Olympic Champions meeting in Minsk two months later, then improved to 78.69 m in July, moving up to second of all time behind Betty Heidler.

== Achievements ==
Year	Competition	Venue	Position	Notes
Representing Belarus
2001	European Junior Championships	Grosseto, Italy	5th	59.24 m
2002	European Championships	Munich, Germany	27th (q)	60.13 m
2003	European U23 Championships	Bydgoszcz, Poland	2nd	67.58 m
2003	World Championships	Paris, France	22nd (q)	64.11 m
2005	Universiade	İzmir, Turkey	5th	69.09 m
2006	European Championships	Gothenburg, Sweden	23rd (q)	62.85 m
2007	World Championships	Osaka, Japan	—	NM
2008	Olympic Games	Beijing, China	DSQ	76.34 m
2009	World Championships	Berlin, Germany	DSQ	69.58 m
2012	Olympic Games	London, United Kingdom	DSQ	74.40 m
2013	World Championships	Moscow, Russia	DSQ	66.65 m
