= Galina Mityaeva =

Tajikistani hammer thrower

Personal information
- Nationality: Tajikistan
- Born: 29 April 1991 (age 35) Shahrtuz, Khatlon, Tajik SSR, Soviet Union
- Height: 1.72 m (5 ft 7 1/2 in)
- Weight: 70 kg (154 lb)

Sport
- Sport: Athletics
- Event: Hammer throw

Achievements and titles
- Personal best: Hammer throw: 63.43 m (2009)

Galina Mityaeva (Tajik: Галина Митяева; born 29 April 1991 in Shahrtuz, Khatlon) is a Tajikistani hammer thrower. Mityaeva represented Tajikistan at the 2008 Summer Olympics in Beijing, where she competed for the women's hammer throw. She performed the best throw of 51.38 metres on her third and final attempt, finishing forty-seventh overall in the qualifying rounds.
