= Anna Bagdanovich =

Belarusian sprinter

Hanna Bahdanovich (Belarusian: Ганна Багдановіч; born October 14, 1983), also transliterated as Anna Bagdanovich, is a track and field sprint athlete who competes internationally for Belarus.

Bahdanovich represented Belarus at the 2008 Summer Olympics in Beijing. She competed at the 4 × 100 metres relay together with Yuliya Nestsiarenka, Aksana Drahun and Nastassia Shuliak. In their first round heat they placed sixth with a time of 43.69 seconds, which was the 9th time overall out of sixteen participating nations. With this result they failed to qualify for the final.
