= Silvia Salis =

Italian politician

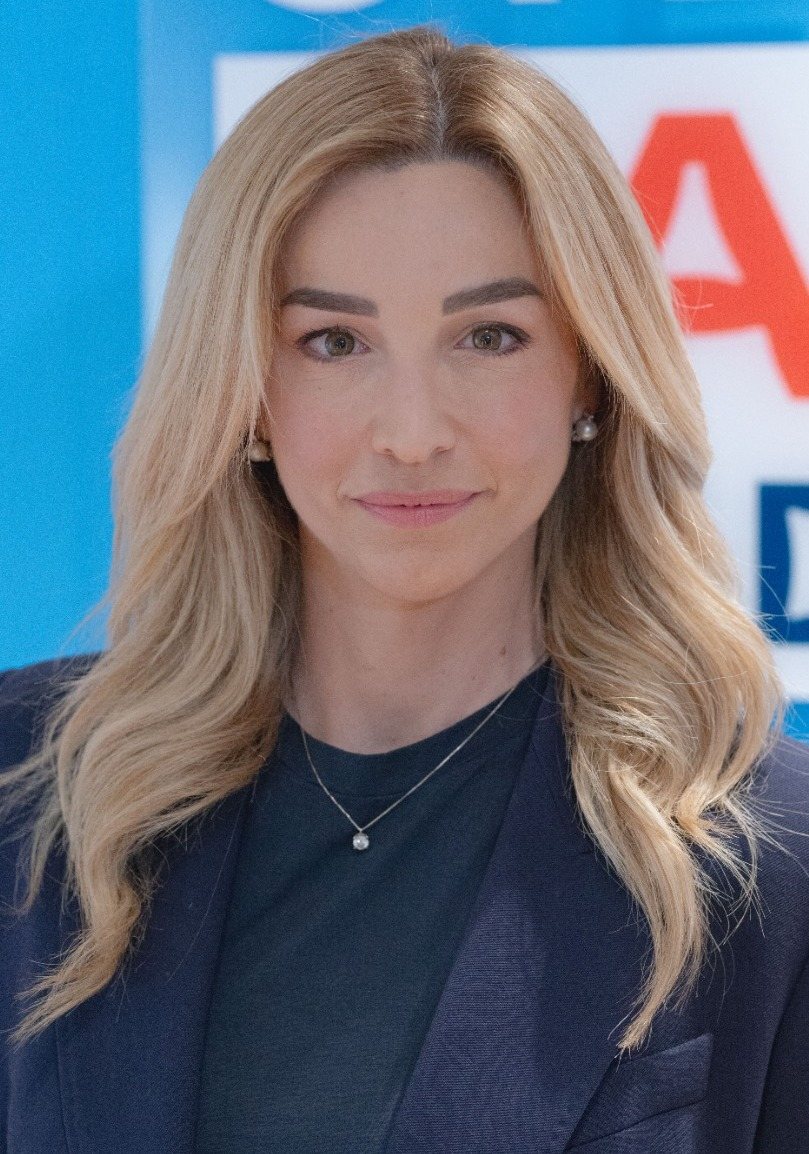
- Salis in 2025

Mayor of Genoa
- Incumbent
- Assumed office 30 May 2025
- Preceded by: Marco Bucci

Metropolitan Mayor of the Genoa
- Incumbent
- Assumed office 30 May 2025
- Preceded by: Antonio Segalerba (acting)

Personal details
- Born: 17 September 1985 (age 41) Genoa, Italy
- Party: Independent
- Other political affiliations: Centre-left coalition
- Spouse: Fausto Brizzi (m. 2020)
- Children: 1
- Education: Link Campus University
- Occupation: Politician; sports manager; athlete
- Sports career
- Height: 1.79 m (5 ft 10 in)
- Weight: 73 kg (161 lb; 11 st 7 lb)
- Country: Italy
- Sport: Athletics
- Event: Hammer throw
- Club: G.S. Fiamme Azzurre

Sports achievements and titles
- Personal best: 71.93 m (2011)
Medal record
Mediterranean Games
| Gold medal – first place | 2009 Pescara | Hammer Throw |
| Bronze medal – third place | 2013 Mersin | Hammer Throw |
European Cup Winter Throwing
| Bronze medal – third place | 2009 Tenerife | Hammer Throw |
| Silver medal – second place | 2010 Arles | Hammer Throw |

Silvia Salis (born 17 September 1985) is an Italian politician, former sports manager and retired hammer thrower. In May 2025, she was elected Mayor of Genoa.

Since 2021, she has served as Vice President of the National Council of the Italian National Olympic Committee.

== Biography ==
=== Early life ===
Silvia Salis was born in Genoa, Liguria, and grew up in the district of Sturla. Her father, Eugenio, originally from Sorso, Sardinia, worked as a groundskeeper at the Villa Gentile athletics field and was an active member of the Italian Communist Party. Her mother was employed by the municipality.

=== Youth career ===
Salis began training in track and field in 1993 at the age of eight. Initially interested in the long jump, she eventually shifted her focus to throwing events under the guidance of coach Valter Superina, himself a former hammer thrower.

Salis's first national successes came in 2001, when she won youth titles and represented Italy at the World Youth Championships in Debrecen. Over the following years, she claimed multiple Italian junior and under-23 titles and took part in major international competitions, including the European and World Junior Championships, as well as the European U23 Championships.

=== Rise to the National Team and the Beijing Olympics ===
Salis made her senior debut with the Italian national team at the 2006 European Championships in Gothenburg, though she did not advance to the final. In 2007, she finished fourth at the European U23 Championships and ninth at the Universiade in Bangkok. The following year she won several national medals, including gold at the university championships and silver at both the indoor and outdoor national competitions. Internationally, she placed seventh at the European Winter Throwing Cup in Split and fifth at the European Cup in Annecy. In 2008 she surpassed the 70-meter mark for the first time, qualifying for the Beijing Olympics. However, she did not reach the final.

=== International breakthrough and medals (2009–2011) ===
In 2009, Salis won two national titles and earned a bronze medal at the European Winter Throwing Cup in the Canary Islands. That summer, she won gold at the Mediterranean Games in Pescara. She also placed fifth at the Universiade in Belgrade and competed at the World Championships in Berlin without reaching the final. Over the next two years, she continued to dominate at the national level, claiming both winter and summer titles. Internationally, she finished seventh at the 2010 European Championships in Barcelona and took silver at the Winter Throwing Cup in Arles. In 2011, she set her personal best of 71.93 meters at a meet in Savona. That season also included top-eight finishes at the Winter Throwing Cup in Sofia, the European Team Championships in Stockholm, and the World Championships in Daegu, where she placed eighth.

=== London Olympics and final seasons (2012–2015) ===
Salis began 2012 with three national titles—indoor, outdoor, and university—but experienced setbacks internationally. She finished ninth at the European Winter Throwing Cup in Montenegro and failed to register a valid throw in qualification at the European Championships in Helsinki. At the London Olympics, she did not progress beyond the qualification round, registering only one legal throw that hit the cage and landed at 10.84 meters.

In the years that followed, she remained a prominent figure in national competitions. In 2013 she was seventh at the European Team Championships in Gateshead. In 2014, she won another national title and placed fourth at the European Winter Throwing Cup in Leiria and fifth at the European Team Championships in Braunschweig. She continued competing in 2015, winning her tenth national title at the Italian Championships in Turin and finishing seventh again in Leiria.

=== Transition to Sports administration ===
In April 2016, Salis retired from competition due to injury. She soon transitioned into a leadership role, becoming a sports executive for the Fiamme Azzurre, the police sports group she had long represented. Later that year, she was elected to the Federal Council of the Italian Athletics Federation (FIDAL). In 2017, she joined the National Council of the Italian National Olympic Committee (CONI), and in May 2021, she was elected Deputy Vice President of CONI.

=== Political career ===
On 26 May 2025, she was elected Mayor of Genoa, defeating the centre-right candidate Pietro Piciocchi. Salis entered politics in early 2025 when she was announced as the centre-left coalition's candidate for mayor of Genoa in the local elections. Her candidacy was backed by the Democratic Party, the Five Star Movement, the Green and Left Alliance, and several civic lists, including one bearing her name, "Silvia Salis Sindaca".

== Personal life ==
She graduated from Link Campus University with a bachelor's degree in political science in 2018.

She married the writer and director Fausto Brizzi in 2020, and their first child was born on 5 October 2023.

== Records ==
=== Progression ===
| Year | Performance | Location | Date | World Rank |
|---|---|---|---|---|
| 2015 | 70.42 m | (Italy) Rieti | 15 June | |
| 2014 | 70.48 m | (Italy) Lucca | 22 February | |
| 2013 | 69.68 m | (Germany) Halle | 25 May | 40ª |
| 2012 | 70.20 m | (Italy) Lucca | 25 February | 45ª |
| 2011 | 71.93 m | (Italy) Savona | 18 May | 15ª |
| 2010 | 71.25 m | (Italy) San Benedetto del Tronto | 7 March | 18ª |
| 2009 | 71.77 m | (Spain) Los Realejos | 14 March | 19ª |
| 2008 | 70.42 m | (Italy) Savona | 8 July | 30ª |
| 2007 | 66.19 m | (Italy) Padua | 27 July | 78ª |
| 2006 | 65.61 m | (Italy) Genova | 20 May | 68ª |
| 2005 | 64.96 m | (Italy) Padua | 2 July | 75ª |
| 2004 | 61.70 m | (Italy) Ascoli Piceno | 28 February | 136ª |
| 2003 | 58.24 m | (Finland) Tampere | 24 July | 217ª |
| 2002 | 55.33 m | (Italy) Savona | 4 May | 287ª |
| 2001 | 52.80 m | (Italy) Genova | 15 September | 345ª |

=== Palmarès ===
| Year | Competition | Venue | Position | Notes |
Representing Italy
| 2003 | European Junior Championships | Tampere, Finland | 10th | 56.14 m |
| 2004 | World Junior Championships | Grosseto, Italy | 12th | 53.76 m |
| 2005 | European U23 Championships | Erfurt, Germany | 13th (q) | 59.59 m |
| 2006 | European Championships | Gothenburg, Sweden | 28th (q) | 61.69 m |
| 2007 | European U23 Championships | Debrecen, Hungary | 4th | 64.92 m |
| 2007 | Universiade | Bangkok, Thailand | 9th | 62.18 m |
| 2008 | Olympic Games | Beijing, China | 42nd (q) | 62.28 m |
| 2009 | Mediterranean Games | Pescara, Italy | 1st | 70.39 m |
| 2009 | World Championships | Berlin, Germany | 18th (q) | 68.55 m |
| 2009 | Universiade | Belgrade, Serbia | 5th | 68.74 m |
| 2010 | European Cup Winter Throwing | Arles, France | 2nd | 69.43 m |
| 2010 | European Championships | Barcelona, Spain | 7th | 68.85 m |
| 2011 | World Championships | Daegu, South Korea | 9th | 69.88 m |
| 2013 | Mediterranean Games | Mersin, Turkey | 3rd | 62.52 m |
| 2015 | World Championships | Beijing, China | 24th (q) | 66.80 m |

=== National titles ===
She has won the individual national championship eight times.

- 3 wins in the hammer throw (2010, 2011, 2012)
- 5 wins in the hammer throw at the Italian Winter Throwing Championships (2009, 2010, 2011, 2012, 2014)
Detailed Championship titles

National Titles
| Year | Competition | Location | Event | Performance |
|---|---|---|---|---|
| 2001 | Italian Senior and Junior Winter Throwing Championships | Pietrasanta | Hammer throw (youth) | 45.38 m |
| 2001 | Italian Youth Championships | Fano | Hammer throw | 56.89 m |
| 2002 | Italian Senior and Junior Winter Throwing Championships | Ascoli Piceno | Hammer throw (youth) | 52.44 m |
| 2002 | Italian Senior Championships | Viareggio | Hammer throw | 55.23 m |
| 2002 | Italian Youth Championships | Turin | Hammer throw | 50.33 m |
| 2003 | Italian Senior and Junior Winter Throwing Championships | Gioia Tauro | Hammer throw (junior) | 57.09 m |
| 2003 | Italian Junior and Under-23 Championships | Grosseto | Hammer throw | 54.17 m |
| 2004 | Italian Senior and Junior Winter Throwing Championships | Ascoli Piceno | Hammer throw (junior) | 61.70 m |
| 2005 | Italian Senior and Junior Winter Throwing Championships | Vigna di Valle | Hammer throw | 63.67 m |
| 2005 | Italian Senior and Junior Winter Throwing Championships (Under-23) | Vigna di Valle | Hammer throw | 63.67 m |
| 2005 | Italian Junior and Under-23 Championships | Grosseto | Hammer throw | 64.13 m |
| 2005 | Italian Senior Championships | Bressanone | Hammer throw | 64.67 m |
| 2006 | Italian Senior and Junior Winter Throwing Championships | Ascoli Piceno | Hammer throw | 63.61 m |
| 2006 | Italian Senior and Junior Winter Throwing Championships (Under-23) | Ascoli Piceno | Hammer throw | 63.61 m |
| 2006 | Italian Senior Championships | Turin | Hammer throw | 62.52 m |
| 2007 | Italian Senior and Junior Winter Throwing Championships | Bari | Hammer throw | 64.46 m |
| 2007 | Italian Senior and Junior Winter Throwing Championships (Under-23) | Bari | Hammer throw | 64.46 m |
| 2007 | Italian University Championships | Jesolo | Hammer throw | 63.92 m |
| 2007 | Italian Senior Championships | Padua | Hammer throw | 66.19 m |
| 2007 | Italian Junior and Under-23 Championships | Bressanone | Hammer throw | 65.87 m |
| 2008 | Italian Winter Throwing Championships | San Benedetto del Tronto | Hammer throw | 66.84 m |
| 2008 | Italian University Championships | Pisa | Hammer throw | 69.67 m |
| 2008 | Italian Senior Championships | Cagliari | Hammer throw | 69.72 m |
| 2009 | Italian Winter Throwing Championships | Bari | Hammer throw | 67.63 m |
| 2009 | Italian University Championships | Lignano Sabbiadoro | Hammer throw | 68.53 m |
| 2009 | Italian Senior Championships | Milan | Hammer throw | 68.59 m |
| 2010 | Italian Winter Throwing Championships | San Benedetto del Tronto | Hammer throw | 71.25 m |
| 2010 | Italian Senior Championships | Grosseto | Hammer throw | 70.23 m |
| 2011 | Italian Winter Throwing Championships | Viterbo | Hammer throw | 67.45 m |
| 2012 | Italian Winter Throwing Championships | Lucca | Hammer throw | 70.20 m |
| 2012 | Italian University Championships | Messina | Hammer throw | 65.15 m |
| 2012 | Italian Senior Championships | Bressanone | Hammer throw | 70.18 m |
| 2014 | Italian Winter Throwing Championships | Lucca | Hammer throw | 70.48 m |
| 2015 | Italian Winter Throwing Championships | Lucca | Hammer throw | 69.36 m |
| 2015 | Italian Senior Championships | Turin | Hammer throw | 67.51 m |

=== Other international competitions ===
| Year | Championship | Country | Placement | Event | Performance |
|---|---|---|---|---|---|
| 2008 | European Cup Winter Throwing | Croatia (Split) | 7th | Hammer throw | 67.17 m |
| 2008 | European Cup | France (Annecy) | 5th | Hammer throw | 70.05 m |
| 2008 | Meeting Internazionale Città di Rieti | Italy (Rieti) | 5th | Hammer throw | 69.59 m |
| 2009 | European Cup Winter Throwing | Spain (Los Realejos) | 3rd (Bronze) | Hammer throw | 71.77 m |
| 2010 | European Cup Winter Throwing | France (Arles) | 2nd (Silver) | Hammer throw | 69.43 m |
| 2010 | IAAF World Challenge Dakar | Senegal (Dakar) | 5th | Hammer throw | 68.36 m |
| 2011 | European Cup Winter Throwing | Bulgaria (Sofia) | 6th | Hammer throw | 68.58 m |
| 2011 | European Team Championships | Sweden (Stockholm) | 8th | Hammer throw | 66.55 m |
| 2012 | European Cup Winter Throwing | Montenegro (Bar) | 9th | Hammer throw | 65.66 m |
| 2013 | European Team Championships | United Kingdom (Gateshead) | 7th | Hammer throw | 64.76 m |
| 2014 | European Cup Winter Throwing | Portugal (Leiria) | 4th | Hammer throw | 68.75 m |
| 2014 | European Team Championships | Germany (Braunschweig) | 5th | Hammer throw | 67.98 m |
| 2015 | European Cup Winter Throwing | Portugal (Leiria) | 7th | Hammer throw | 68.85 m |

== Bibliography ==
- Salis, Silvia (2022). La bambina più forte del mondo (in Italian). Illustrated by Roberto Irace. Milan: Salani. ISBN 978-88-310-1135-8.

== Electoral history ==
2025 Genoa mayoral election
| Candidate | Party | Coalition | First round | |
| Candidate | Party | Coalition | Votes | % |
|---|---|---|---|---|
| Silvia Salis | Ind | PD-AVS-M5S-IV-A-Volt | 124,720 | 51.48 |
| Pietro Piciocchi | FdI | FdI-FI-L-NM-UDC | 107,091 | 44.20 |
| Others | | | 10,449 | 4.32 |
| Eligible voters | | | 479,974 | 100.00 |
| Voted | | | 249,115 | 51.90 |
| Blank or invalid ballots | | | 6,855 | |
| Total valid votes | | | 242,260 | |

Political offices
| Preceded by Marco Bucci | Mayor of Genoa since 2025 | Incumbent |
