= Amber Campbell =

American hammer thrower

Personal information
- Born: June 5, 1981 (age 45) Cincinnati, Ohio
- Height: 1.70 m (5 ft 7 in)
- Weight: 91 kg (201 lb)

Sport
- Country: United States
- Sport: Athletics
- Event: Hammer throw

Achievements and titles
- Personal best: 74.03 metres (242.9 ft) (2016)
Medal record
Pan American Games
Silver medal – second place	2015 Toronto	Hammer
Bronze medal – third place	2011 Guadalajara	Hammer
NACAC Championships
Gold medal – first place	2015 Costa Rica	Hammer
- Updated on 7 October 2012

Amber Campbell (born June 5, 1981) is an American hammer thrower. Campbell attended Coastal Carolina University in South Carolina and competed for the Chanticleer track team. She had her first international competition at the 2005 World Championships. She then competed in the 2009, 2011, 2013, and 2015 World Championships. Her first Olympic berth came at the 2008 Olympic Games in Beijing, China. She then went on to compete at the 2012 Olympic Games as well. At the 2016 Summer Olympics in Brazil, Campbell advanced to the finals placing 6th finishing as the highest placing American woman ever.

Her personal best is 74.03 m (242 ft 10 in), which was her winning mark at the 2016 United States Olympic Trials in Eugene. The mark is the former W35 Masters World Record.

== International competitions ==
Year	Competition	Venue	Position	Notes
Representing the United States
2002	NACAC U-25 Championships	San Antonio, Texas, United States	2nd	62.71 m
2005	World Championships	Helsinki, Finland	18th (q)	65.48 m
2008	Olympic Games	Beijing, PR China	21st (q)	67.86 m
2009	World Championships	Berlin, Germany	11th	70.08 m
2011	Pan American Games	Guadalajara, Mexico	3rd	69.93 m
2012	Olympic Games	London, United Kingdom	13th (q)	69.93 m
2013	World Championships	Moscow, Russia	13th (q)	69.86 m
2015	Pan American Games	Toronto, Canada	2nd	71.22 m
2015	NACAC Championships	San José, Costa Rica	1st	72.41 m
2015	World Championships	Beijing, China	–	NM
2016	Olympic Games	Rio de Janeiro, Brazil	6th	72.74 m
