= Anita Włodarczyk =

Polish hammer thrower (born 1985)

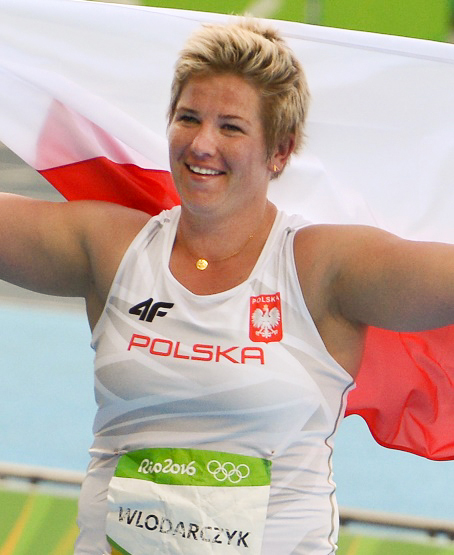
- Anita Włodarczyk in 2016 Rio Olympics

Personal information
- Born: 8 August 1985 (age 41) Rawicz, Poland
- Height: 1.76 m (5 ft 9 in)
- Weight: 100 kg (220 lb)

Sport
- Sport: Athletics
- Event: Hammer throw
- Club: Skra Warszawa
Medal record
Women's athletics
Representing Poland
Event	1st	2nd	3rd
Olympic Games	3	0	0
World Championships	4	0	0
European Championships	4	1	1
Continental Cup	1	0	0
European Team Championships	3	1	0
Total	15	2	1
Olympic Games
Gold medal – first place	2012 London	Hammer throw
Gold medal – first place	2016 Rio de Janeiro	Hammer throw
Gold medal – first place	2020 Tokyo	Hammer throw
World Championships
Gold medal – first place	2009 Berlin	Hammer throw
Gold medal – first place	2013 Moscow	Hammer throw
Gold medal – first place	2015 Beijing	Hammer throw
Gold medal – first place	2017 London	Hammer throw
European Championships
Gold medal – first place	2012 Helsinki	Hammer throw
Gold medal – first place	2014 Zürich	Hammer throw
Gold medal – first place	2016 Amsterdam	Hammer throw
Gold medal – first place	2018 Berlin	Hammer throw
Silver medal – second place	2024 Rome	Hammer throw
Bronze medal – third place	2010 Barcelona	Hammer throw
European Team Championships
Gold medal – first place	2009 Leiria	Hammer throw
Gold medal – first place	2015 Cheboksary	Hammer throw
Gold medal – first place	2025 Madrid	Hammer throw
Silver medal – second place	2013 Gateshead	Hammer throw
Continental Cup
Gold medal – first place	2014 Marrakech	Hammer throw
European Cup Winter Throwing
Gold medal – first place	2008 Split	Hammer throws
Gold medal – first place	2009 Split	Hammer throw
Jeux de la Francophonie
Gold medal – first place	2013 Nice	Hammer throw

Anita Włodarczyk (Polish pronunciation: [aˈɲita vwɔˈdart͡ʂɨk]; born 8 August 1985) is a Polish hammer thrower. She is the 2012, 2016 and 2020 Olympic champion, and the first woman in history to throw the hammer over 80 m; she currently holds the women's world record of 82.98 m. She is widely considered the greatest female hammer thrower of all time.

She was voted the Polish Sports Personality of the Year in 2016 and received the Commander's Cross with Star of the Order of Polonia Restituta in 2021 for her outstanding achievements in sport.

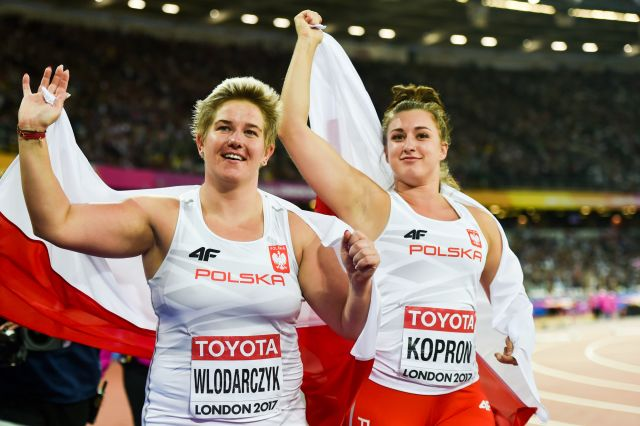
Włodarczyk (on the left) celebrating her gold medal of 2017 World Championships with teammate and bronze medalist Malwina Kopron.

== Career ==
=== Early life and competition ===
Włodarczyk won her first national U23 championships in 2007, and went on to compete in the 2007 European Athletics U23 Championships, although she did not progress beyond the qualifying round. She finished fourth in the hammer throw competition at the 2008 Olympic Games.

Włodarczyk qualified for the 2008 World Athletics Final and won a bronze medal. The following year, she took part in the 2009 European Team Championships, winning her first gold medal at a major international competition.

Włodarczyk achieved a personal best throw of 76.20 metres (250.0 ft), achieved on 30 May 2009 in Biała Podlaska, beating her previous record by 81 cm and improve 76.59 m in Golden Spike Ostrava. Prior to the 2009 World Championships in Athletics, she produced a national record-breaking performance in Cottbus, winning the competition with a world-leading 77.20-metre (253.3 ft) throw. This was fourth longest throw by a woman in hammer throw.

=== First world record ===
On 22 August 2009, during the World Championships in Athletics in Berlin, Germany, Włodarczyk set a world record with a throw of 77.96 metres (255 ft 9 in). Her season ended prematurely when she twisted her left ankle during her celebration. Returning to competition at the Meeting Grand Prix IAAF de Dakar in April 2010, she easily won her event with a throw of 75.13 m. She then proceeded to break her existing world record with a 78.30-metre (256.9 ft) hammer throw at the Enea Cup in Bydgoszcz on 6 June 2010. She won the bronze at the 2010 European Athletics Championships and was ranked second overall for the season in the IAAF Hammer Throw Challenge, finishing behind Betty Heidler. She finished outside of the medals at the 2011 World Championships in Athletics, coming fifth overall.

=== Olympic Games and further successes ===
In 2012, Włodarczyk finished third at the Ostrava Golden Spike and was the runner-up at the Prefontaine Classic. At the 2012 Summer Olympics, she won the silver medal with a throw of 77.60 m. On 11 October 2016, she was retroactively awarded gold after Russia's Tatyana Lysenko was stripped of the medal after testing positive for the prohibited substance dehydrochlormethyltestosterone (turinabol) in reanalysis of her stored doping samples.

In 2014, Włodarczyk won the European Championship with a throw of 78.76, which was a championship and national record.

On 1 August 2015 Włodarczyk set a new world record with a throw of 81.08 metres (266.0 ft) and became the first woman to throw the hammer over 80 metres (260 ft). She went on to win the gold medal at the World Championships, once again throwing over 80 metres (260 ft).

On 15 August 2016 Włodarczyk won the gold medal at the Olympic Games in Rio, setting a new world record with a throw of 82.29 metres (270.0 ft). On 28 August 2016, she threw 82.98 metres (272.2 ft), setting a new world record just two weeks after the Olympics at the EAA 7th Kamila Skolimowska Memorial in Warsaw. In competition, Włodarczyk uses some of the equipment that belonged to the late Skolimowska, as a tribute to her fellow hammer thrower.

In 2014, 2016 and 2017 she was given Track & Field News Athlete of the Year award.

In 2017, she received Polish Sportspersonality of the Year Award for her sports achievements in the previous year. She finished the year with a 42 contests winning streak which began in July 2014.

As of 2020, she holds all of the top 15 women's hammer throw results and 27 out of the top 30.

=== Third consecutive Olympic gold medal ===
At the 2020 Summer Olympics, she won the hammer throw event with a throw of 78.48 m. Włodarczyk is the only woman to ever win this event three times in a row (in the men's competition, only John Flanagan did so, winning the event at the 1900, 1904 and 1908 Summer Olympics). She is also the first woman to win a specific individual athletics event three times in a row at the Olympic Games. With three Olympic gold medals, she ranks third in the all-time medal table among Polish athletes who competed at the Summer Olympics, behind racewalker Robert Korzeniowski and sprinter Irena Szewińska.

== Awards and accolades ==
Some of the selected awards and honours she received for her sports achievements include:

- Knight's Cross of the Order of Polonia Restituta, 2009
- Officer's Cross of the Order of Polonia Restituta, 2016
- Polish Sports Personality of the Year awarded by the Przegląd Sportowy magazine, 2016
- Honorary Citizen of the town of Rawicz, 2016
- Commander's Cross with Star of the Order of Polonia Restituta, 2021
- In 2021, Mattel announced the creation of a Shero Barbie doll with Włodarczyk's image for her "inspiration to others" in pursuing their dreams. She became the third Polish woman to have one after Martyna Wojciechowska and Iwona Blecharczyk.

== International competitions ==
Year	Competition	Venue	Position	Notes
2007	European U23 Championships	Debrecen, Hungary	9th	63.74 m
2008	European Winter Throwing Cup	Split, Croatia	1st	71.84 m
2008	Olympic Games	Beijing, China	4th	71.56 m
2008	World Athletics Final	Stuttgart, Germany	3rd	70.97 m
2009	European Team Championships	Leiria, Portugal	1st	75.23 m
2009	World Championships	Berlin, Germany	1st	77.96 m
2010	European Championships	Barcelona, Spain	3rd	73.56 m
2011	World Championships	Daegu, South Korea	5th	73.56 m
2012	European Championships	Helsinki, Finland	1st	74.29 m
2012	Olympic Games	London, United Kingdom	1st	77.60 m
2013	World Championships	Moscow, Russia	1st	78.46 m
2013	Jeux de la Francophonie	Nice, France	1st	75.62 m
2014	European Championships	Zürich, Switzerland	1st	78.76 m
2014	Continental Cup	Marrakesh, Morocco	1st	75.21 m
2015	World Championships	Beijing, China	1st	80.85 m
2016	European Championships	Amsterdam, Netherlands	1st	78.14 m
2016	Olympic Games	Rio de Janeiro, Brazil	1st	82.29 m OR
2017	World Championships	London, United Kingdom	1st	77.90 m
2018	Athletics World Cup	London, United Kingdom	1st	78.74 m
2018	European Championships	Berlin, Germany	1st	78.94 m
2021	Olympic Games	Tokyo, Japan	1st	78.48 m
2023	World Championships	Budapest, Hungary	13th (q)	71.17 m
2024	European Championships	Rome, Italy	2nd	72.92 m
2024	Olympic Games	Paris, France	4th	74.23 m
2025	World Championships	Tokyo, Japan	6th	74.64 m
2026	European Championships	Birmingham, United Kingdom	4th	72.37 m

== See also ==
- Sport in Poland
- List of Polish records in athletics
- List of Polish track and field athletes

Records
Preceded by Tatyana Lysenko; Betty Heidler	Women's Hammer World Record Holder; 22 August 2009 – 21 May 2011; 31 August 2014 –	Succeeded by Betty Heidler; Incumbent
Awards
Preceded by Valerie Adams; Genzebe Dibaba	Women's Track & Field Athlete of the Year; 2014; 2016, 2017	Succeeded by Genzebe Dibaba; Caster Semenya
