= Tatyana Lysenko =

Russian hammer thrower

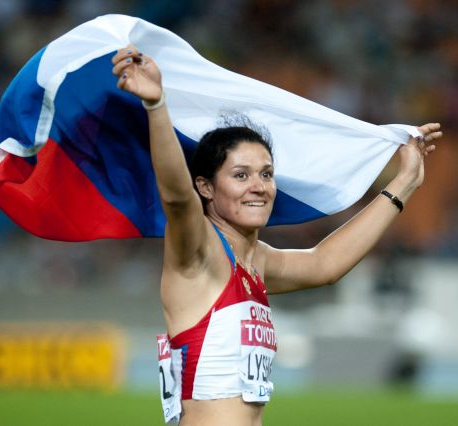
- Lysenko in 2011

Personal information
- Native name: Татьяна Викторовна ԓысенко
- Full name: Tatyana Viktorovna Lysenko
- Born: 9 October 1983 (age 42) Bataysk, Soviet Union
- Height: 1.86 m (6 ft 1 1/4 in)
- Weight: 81 kg (179 lb)

Sport
- Country: Russia
- Sport: Women's athletics
- Event: Hammer throw

Achievements and titles
- Personal best: 78.80 m (2013)
Medal record
Olympic Games
Disqualified	2012 London	Hammer
World Championships
Gold medal – first place	2011 Daegu	Hammer
Disqualified	2013 Moscow	Hammer
Silver medal – second place	2005 Helsinki	Hammer
European Championships
Gold medal – first place	2006 Gothenburg	Hammer
Silver medal – second place	2010 Barcelona	Hammer

Tatyana Viktorovna Lysenko (Russian: Татьяна Викторовна Лысенко, born 9 October 1983 in Bataysk) is a Russian hammer thrower. Her career has been blighted by repeated doping infractions. In February 2019, the Court of Arbitration for Sport handed her an eight-year ban for doping, starting from 2 July 2016.

== Career ==
Lysenko's first world record was a 77.06-metre throw, achieved on 15 July 2005 in Moscow, beating the old record of Mihaela Melinte by 0.99 metres. On 12 June 2006 she lost the record to her compatriot Gulfiya Khanafeyeva, who threw 77.26 metres at the Russian athletics championships in Tula. However, Lysenko threw 77.41 metres on June 24 in Zhukovsky and 77.80 metres in Tallinn, Estonia on August 15. On 21 July 2007 it was reported that she failed a drug test, testing positive for a women's hormone blocker. In 2008, she was found guilty of using 6α-methylandrostendione and received a two-year ban (15.07.07 – 14.07.09) and disqualification of all results from 9 May 2007, including her world record of 78.61 m set on 26 May 2007.

Lysenko returned to competition in July 2009, taking the Russian title with a 76.41 m throw. She won the gold at the 2010 IAAF Continental Cup and ranked third in the inaugural IAAF Hammer Throw Challenge at the end of the year, with a combined score of 223.96 metres for her three best throws. In 2011, she won her first world championship in the first world championships where the top three women all went over 75 m. She was awarded the hammer throw gold medal at the 2012 London Olympics with a throw of 78.18 m. She won the 2013 World Championships with a world leading throw of 78.80 m.

In May 2016 La Gazzetta dello Sport reported that a retest of Lysenko's samples from the 2012 Summer Olympics had tested positive for doping products, her third failure. If confirmed in the B sample, she stood to lose her Olympic and second World titles and faced a lifetime ban from the sport. In October, she was stripped of her Olympic gold medal.

== International competitions ==
Representing Russia
Year	Competition	Venue	Position	Event	Result	Notes
2003	European U23 Championships	Bydgoszcz, Poland	5th	Hammer throw	64.48 m	
2004	Olympic Games	Athens, Greece	19th	Hammer throw	66.82 m	
2005	World Championships	Helsinki, Finland	2nd	Hammer throw	72.46 m	
2006	European Championships	Gothenburg, Sweden	1st	Hammer throw	76.67 m	CR
2006	World Cup	Athens, Greece	2nd	Hammer throw	74.44 m	
2009	World Championships	Berlin, Germany	6th	Hammer throw	72.22 m	
2010	European Cup Winter Throwing	Arles, France	3rd	Hammer throw	69.11 m	
2010	European Championships	Barcelona, Spain	2nd	Hammer throw	75.65 m	
2010	Continental Cup	Split, Croatia	1st	Hammer throw	73.88 m	
2010	DécaNation	Annecy, France	1st	Hammer throw	72.95 m	
2011	World Championships	Daegu, South Korea	1st	Hammer throw	77.13 m	
2011	DécaNation	Nice, France	1st	Hammer throw	74.17 m	
2012	Olympic Games	London, United Kingdom	DQ	Hammer throw	~~78.18 m~~	Doping
2013	World Championships	Moscow, Russia	DQ	Hammer throw	~~78.80 m~~	~~CR~~, Doping

== See also ==
- List of doping cases in athletics
- List of World Athletics Championships medalists (women)
- List of European Athletics Championships medalists (women)
- Doping at the Olympic Games
- List of 2012 Summer Olympics medal winners
- List of stripped Olympic medals
- List of Russian sportspeople
- List of hammer throwers

Records
Preceded by Mihaela Melinte	Women's hammer world record holder 15 July 2005 – 12 June 2006	Succeeded by Gulfiya Khanafeyeva
Preceded by Gulfiya Khanafeyeva	Women's hammer world record holder 24 June 2006 — 22 August 2009	Succeeded by Anita Włodarczyk
