= 2009 IAAF World Athletics Final =

International track and field competition

- Host city: Thessaloniki, Greece
- Events: 36
- Dates: 12 – 13 September
- Main venue: Kaftanzoglio Stadium
- Individual prize money (US$): 3,020,000 in total

The 7th IAAF World Athletics Final was held at the Kaftanzoglio Stadium in Thessaloniki, Greece on September 12 and September 13, 2009. The competition represented the culmination of the 2009 IAAF World Athletics Tour, a selection of athletics meetings which began on September 20, 2008 at the Shanghai Golden Grand Prix. The Hellenic Amateur Athletic Association (SEGAS) won the rights to hold the event in April 2008.

The competitors in each event were decided by the final standings of the 2009 World Athletics Tour. Having scored points for their performances at specified meetings throughout the season, the seven athletes with the most points in each event qualified to compete, while eleven athletes were selected for races of 1500 metres and above. One additional athlete, a wildcard, was allocated to each event by the IAAF and replacement athletes were admitted to take the place of qualified athletes who could not attend the final.

== Results ==
=== Men ===
| Event | Gold | | Silver | | Bronze | |
|---|---|---|---|---|---|---|
| 100 m | Tyson Gay; United States | 9.88 | Asafa Powell; Jamaica | 9.90 | Darvis Patton; United States | 10.00 |
| 200 m | Usain Bolt; Jamaica | 19.68 =CR | Wallace Spearmon; United States | 20.21 | Brendan Christian; Antigua and Barbuda | 20.65 |
| 400 m | LaShawn Merritt; United States | 44.93 | Chris Brown; Bahamas | 45.49 | David Neville; United States | 45.60 |
| 800 m | David Rudisha; Kenya | 1:44.85 CR | Gary Reed; Canada | 1:45.23 | Mbulaeni Mulaudzi; South Africa | 1:45.53 |
| 1500 m | William Biwott Tanui; Kenya | 3:35.04 | Leonel Manzano; United States | 3:35.40 | Augustine Kiprono Choge; Kenya | 3:35.46 |
| 3000 m | Kenenisa Bekele; Ethiopia | 8:03.79 | Bernard Lagat; United States | 8:04.00 | Sammy Alex Mutahi; Kenya | 8:04.64 |
| 5000 m | Imane Merga; Ethiopia | 13:29.75 | Micah Kipkemboi Kogo; Kenya | 13:29.76 | Edwin Soi; Kenya | 13:29.76 |
| 3000 m steeplechase | Ezekiel Kemboi; Kenya | 8:04.38 | Paul Kipsiele Koech; Kenya | 8:05.47 | Bouabdellah Tahri; France | 8:09.14 |
| 110 m hurdles | Ryan Brathwaite; Barbados | 13.16 | Dexter Faulk; United States | 13.26 | Dwight Thomas; Jamaica | 13.29 |
| 400 m hurdles | Kerron Clement; United States | 48.11 | L. J. van Zyl; South Africa | 48.74 | Periklis Iakovakis; Greece | 48.90 |
| High jump | Yaroslav Rybakov; Russia | 2.34 | Jaroslav Bába; Czech Republic | 2.32 | Jesse Williams; United States | 2.29 |
| Pole vault | Maksym Mazuryk; Ukraine | 5.70 | Derek Miles; United States | 5.60 | Damiel Dossévi; France | 5.60 |
| Long jump | Fabrice Lapierre; Australia | 8.33w | Dwight Phillips; United States | 8.24 | Godfrey Khotso Mokoena; South Africa | 8.17 |
| Triple jump | Arnie David Giralt; Cuba | 17.45 | Leevan Sands; Bahamas | 17.19 | Momchil Karailiev; Bulgaria | 17.18 |
| Shot put | Christian Cantwell; United States | 22.07 CR | Tomasz Majewski; Poland | 21.21 | Pavel Sofin; Russia | 20.82 PB |
| Discus | Virgilijus Alekna; Lithuania | 67.63 | Robert Harting; Germany | 66.37 | Piotr Małachowski; Poland | 65.60 |
| Hammer | Primož Kozmus; Slovenia | 79.80 | Igors Sokolovs; Latvia | 79.32 | Krisztián Pars; Hungary | 77.49 |
| Javelin | Andreas Thorkildsen; Norway | 87.75 | Tero Pitkämäki; Finland | 84.09 | Mark Frank; Germany | 82.46 |
WR world record | AR area record | CR championship record | GR games record | NR national record | OR Olympic record | PB personal best | SB season best | WL world leading (in a given season)

=== Women ===
| Event | Gold | | Silver | | Bronze | |
|---|---|---|---|---|---|---|
| 100 m | Carmelita Jeter; United States | 10.67 CR | Shelly-Ann Fraser; Jamaica | 10.89 | Kerron Stewart; Jamaica | 10.90 |
| 200 m | Allyson Felix; United States | 22.29 | Sanya Richards; United States | 22.29 SB | Kerron Stewart; Jamaica | 22.42 SB |
| 400 m | Sanya Richards; United States | 49.95 | Novlene Williams-Mills; Jamaica | 50.34 | Shericka Williams; Jamaica | 50.49 |
| 800 m | Anna Willard; United States | 2:00.20 | Maggie Vessey; United States | 2:00.31 | Jennifer Meadows; Great Britain | 2:00.41 |
| 1500 m | Nancy Lagat; Kenya | 4:13.63 | Hannah England; Great Britain | 4:14.05 | Christin Wurth-Thomas; United States | 4:14.10 |
| 3000 m | Meseret Defar; Ethiopia | 8:30.15 WL | Vivian Cheruiyot; Kenya | 8:30.61 PB | Wude Ayalew; Ethiopia | 8:30.93 SB |
| 5000 m | Meseret Defar; Ethiopia | 15:25.43 | Tirunesh Dibaba; Ethiopia | 15:25.92 | Vivian Cheruiyot; Kenya | 15:26.21 |
| 3000 m steeplechase | Ruth Bosibori; Kenya | 9:13.43 CR | Milcah Chemos Cheywa; Kenya | 9:20.19 | Gladys Kipkemoi; Kenya | 9:21.18 |
| 100 m hurdles | Brigitte Foster-Hylton; Jamaica | 12.58 | Dawn Harper; United States | 12.61 | Delloreen Ennis-London; Jamaica | 12.61 |
| 400 m hurdles | Melaine Walker; Jamaica | 53.36 CR | Kaliese Spencer; Jamaica | 53.99 | Josanne Lucas; Trinidad and Tobago | 54.31 |
| High jump | Blanka Vlašić; Croatia | 2.04 CR | ~~Anna Chicherova(xo)~~; Russia | ~~2.00(xo)~~ (DSQ) | Antonietta Di Martino; Italy | 1.97 |
| Pole vault | Yelena Isinbayeva; Russia | 4.80 | Fabiana Murer; Brazil; Monika Pyrek; Poland | 4.60 | | |
| Long jump | Brittney Reese; United States | 7.08 CR | Yelena Sokolova; Russia | 6.81 | Tatyana Lebedeva; Russia | 6.79 |
| Triple jump | Mabel Gay; Cuba | 14.62 | Biljana Topić; Serbia | 14.56 NR | Tatyana Lebedeva; Russia | 14.48 SB |
| Shot put | Valerie Vili; New Zealand | 21.07 CR | Nadzeya Ostapchuk; Belarus | 19.56 | Natallia Mikhnevich; Belarus | 19.27 |
| Discus | Yarelis Barrios; Cuba | 65.86 CR | Żaneta Glanc; Poland | 63.36 | Mélina Robert-Michon; France | 61.74 |
| Hammer | Betty Heidler; Germany | 72.03 | Clarissa Claretti; Italy | 70.56 | Martina Hrašnová; Slovakia | 70.45 |
| Javelin | Vacant | | Barbora Špotáková; Czech Republic | 63.45 | Steffi Nerius; Germany | 62.59 |
WR world record | AR area record | CR championship record | GR games record | NR national record | OR Olympic record | PB personal best | SB season best | WL world leading (in a given season)
