= Yipsi Moreno =

Cuban hammer thrower

Personal information
- Born: 19 November 1980 (age 45) Agramonte, Camagüey, Cuba
- Height: 1.75 m (5 ft 9 in)
- Weight: 78 kg (172 lb)

Sport
- Country: Cuba (until 2014); Albania (from 2025)
- Sport: Athletics
- Event: Hammer throw
Medal record
Olympic Games
Gold medal – first place	2008 Beijing	Hammer
Silver medal – second place	2004 Athens	Hammer
World Championships
Gold medal – first place	2001 Edmonton	Hammer
Gold medal – first place	2003 Paris	Hammer
Gold medal – first place	2005 Helsinki	Hammer
Silver medal – second place	2007 Osaka	Hammer
Pan American Games
Gold medal – first place	2003 Santo Domingo	Hammer
Gold medal – first place	2007 Rio de Janeiro	Hammer
Gold medal – first place	2011 Guadalajara	Hammer
Silver medal – second place	1999 Winnipeg	Hammer
- Updated on 9 January 2015

Yipsi Moreno González (born 19 November 1980) is a Cuban-born naturalized Albanian hammer thrower. She is a triple world champion and Olympic gold medalist, a former world junior record holder and current area record holder.

In 2016, after the 2008 Olympic gold medallist Belarus athlete Aksana Miankova received a disqualification by IAAF, Moreno became Olympic hammer throw champion for Cuba in the 2008 Olympic Games in Beijing.

== Early life and education ==
At the age of 11, she was recruited by the Cerro Pelado Sports School in her hometown, where she started practicing shot put and discus throw. Hammer throw was not a regular women's event at the time, but following its introduction in Cuba in 1993, she eventually concentrated on this event and she earned a place on the national junior team in 1996.

== Athletics career ==
=== 1997–2000 ===
In 1997, Moreno won the Pan American Junior Championships in Havana with a throw of 55.74 metres, improving the two-year-old championship record with ten metres. She beat the second-place finisher Maureen Griffin by a 46 centimetre margin. This year she threw past the 60 metre mark for the first time, with 61.96 m. The next year, she finished fourth at the 1998 World Junior Championships, this time 29 centimetres behind Griffin. After the World Junior Championships, Moreno started working with a new coach Eladio Hernández, himself a former hammer thrower. The cooperation paid off almost immediately as Moreno established a new world junior record on 29 May 1999 with 66.34 metres at altitude in Mexico City.

Later that year, she won the silver medal at the Pan American Games with 63.03 metres, only beaten by Dawn Ellerbe who threw 65.36. At the World Championships the same year her only valid throw measured 58.68 metres, giving her an eighteenth place in the final (there was no qualification round). At her next major competition, the 2000 Olympics, she improved to fourth place.

=== 2001–2002 ===
In 2001, she broke the 70 metre barrier for the first time, and improved her personal best to 70.65 metres as she won the World Championships in Edmonton. Three weeks later she won the silver medal at the 2001 Summer Universiade behind Manuela Montebrun of France, who had finished fifth in Edmonton. In 2002, she improved to 71.47 metres in Madrid in July. She was selected to represent the Americas at the 2002 World Cup held in the same city two months later, and finished second.

=== 2003–2005 ===
In July 2003, she improved further to 75.14 metres. At the Pan American Games she won the gold ahead of compatriot Yunaika Crawford, smashing Dawn Ellerbe's championship record with a 74.25 metres throw. At the World Championships in August she defended her title with a second round effort of 73.33 metres. Her third round result of 72.52 m further secured the gold as runner-up Olga Kuzenkova managed no more than 71.71 m. Commenting on her victory, Moreno stated that she "was happy for Cuba and my family". The inaugural World Athletics Final in Szombathely, where she obtained another triumph, concluded the season. At the end of the year she was named Cuban Sportswoman of the Year for 2003.

2004 was an Olympic year and Moreno was considered the pre-event favourite for the hammer throw contest. Not only was she in lead of the world ranking, her new personal best and South American record of 75.18 metres from the National Cuban Olympics in Havana in April was the world leading result. In the Olympic final, however, her chance of winning soon dwindled as Olga Kuzenkova took the lead and Moreno fouled her first throw. Moreno went on to foul on three of her five remaining efforts, managing 73.36 metres in the fourth round, while Kuzenkova had improved to 75.02 metres in the third round. Yunaika Crawford took the bronze medal behind Moreno.

The 2004 Olympic Games was the only major competition for Moreno in 2004. She did not compete at the World Athletics Final and experienced a foot injury which sidelined her for the first half of 2005. This meant she was dethroned from the leading position at the world ranking, but she recovered the position after a gold medal at the 2005 World Championships and a victory at the 2005 World Athletics Final. For the first time in her career, however, she went a whole season without improving her personal best.

=== 2006–2007 ===
In early 2006, Moreno won her first Central American and Caribbean Games title, setting another championship record with 70.22 metres. In August she again lost her top ranking position, this time to Russia's Tatyana Lysenko who had established a new world record of 77.80 m. Moreno's season best mark was 74.69 m from the Ostrava Super Grand Prix in May. She finished third at the 2006 World Athletics Final and the 2006 World Cup, both times behind Kamila Skolimowska of Poland.

On 3 March 2007, she broke her own area record as she threw 75.64 metres in Kingston, Jamaica. Establishing the new record in the fifth round of the competition, she followed this up with a 75.43 metres throw in the final round, again longer than her previous personal best. "I have had a good start this year, without physical problems", Moreno explained. On 17 June she improved the record again, with a 76.36 m throw from the second round in the Janusz Kusocinski Memorial, Warsaw.

=== 2008 ===
At the 2008 Olympics Women's Hammer Throw final, Moreno again won a silver medal, this time behind Aksana Miankova of Belarus, who threw an Olympic Record distance of 76.34 meters in her second-to-last round. Moreno was in the silver medal position with one throw left, and in her final effort, she fell short of Miankova with a throw of 75.20 meters, although it was her best throw of the final.

She was declared 2008 Olympic Champion in 2016, after Belarusian Aksana Miankova was disqualified for using prohibited substances.

== Personal bests ==
- Hammer throw: 76.62 m – Zagreb, Croatia, 9 September 2008

== Achievements ==
Year	Competition	Venue	Position	Notes
Representing Cuba
1997	Pan American Junior Championships	Havana, Cuba	1st	55.74 m
1998	Ibero-American Championships	Lisbon, Portugal	2nd	57.97 m
1998	World Junior Championships	Annecy, France	4th	59.85 m
1999	Pan American Games	Winnipeg, Canada	2nd	63.03 m
1999	World Championships	Seville, Spain	18th (q)	58.68 m
2000	Olympic Games	Sydney, Australia	4th	68.33 m
2001	World Championships	Edmonton, Canada	1st	70.65 m
2001	Universiade	Beijing, China	2nd	68.39 m
2001	Goodwill Games	Brisbane, Australia	4th	67.83 m
2002	World Cup	Madrid, Spain	2nd	69.65 m
2003	Pan American Games	Santo Domingo, Dominican Republic	1st	74.25 m
2003	World Championships	Paris, France	1st	73.33 m
2003	World Athletics Final	Szombathely, Hungary	1st	73.42 m
2004	Ibero-American Championships	Huelva, Spain	1st	71.06 m
2004	Olympic Games	Athens, Greece	2nd	73.36 m
2005	World Championships	Helsinki, Finland	1st	73.08 m
2005	World Athletics Final	Szombathely, Hungary	1st	74.75 m
2006	Central American and Caribbean Games	Cartagena, Colombia	1st	70.22 m
2006	World Athletics Final	Stuttgart, Germany	3rd	71.85 m
2006	World Cup	Athens, Greece	3rd	73.99 m
2007	ALBA Games	Caracas, Venezuela	1st	70.44 m
2007	Pan American Games	Rio de Janeiro, Brazil	1st	75.20 m
2007	World Championships	Osaka, Japan	2nd	74.74 m
2007	World Athletics Final	Stuttgart, Germany	1st	73.76 m
2008	Olympic Games	Beijing, China	1st	75.20 m
2008	World Athletics Final	Stuttgart, Germany	1st	74.09 m
2010	Ibero-American Championships	San Fernando, Spain	—	NM
2010	Continental Cup	Split, Croatia	3rd	72.73 m
2011	World Championships	Daegu, South Korea	4th	74.48 m
2011	Pan American Games	Guadalajara, Mexico	1st	75.62 m A
2012	Olympic Games	London, United Kingdom	5th	74.60 m
2013	World Championships	Moscow, Russia	5th	74.16 m
2014	Pan American Sports Festival	Mexico City, Mexico	2nd	69.65 m A
2014	Central American and Caribbean Games	Xalapa, Mexico	1st	71.35 m A
Representing Albania
2025	World Championships	Tokyo, Japan	34th (q)	65.38 m
2026	Balkan Championships	Volos, Greece	2nd	67.85 m
2026	European Championships	Birmingham, United Kingdom	29th (q)	58.85 m
2026	Mediterranean Games	Taranto, Italy	6th	65.99 m
