= Athletics at the 2001 Goodwill Games – Results =

These are the official results of the athletics competition at the 2001 Goodwill Games which took place on September 4–7, 2001 in Brisbane, Australia.

== Men's results ==
=== 100 meters ===
September 5

Rank	Lane	Name	Nationality	Time	Notes
1st place, gold medalist(s)	4	Dwain Chambers	Great Britain	10.11	
2nd place, silver medalist(s)	6	Tim Montgomery	United States	10.27	
3rd place, bronze medalist(s)	8	Matt Shirvington	Australia	10.30	
4	7	Aziz Zakari	Ghana	10.30	
5	5	Ato Boldon	Trinidad and Tobago	10.41	
6	3	Dennis Mitchell	United States	10.46	
7	2	Jonathan Barbour	Great Britain	10.47	
8	9	Joshua J. Johnson	United States	10.51	

=== 200 meters ===
September 6

Rank	Lane	Name	Nationality	Time	Notes
1st place, gold medalist(s)	8	Shawn Crawford	United States	20.17	
2nd place, silver medalist(s)	7	Christopher Williams	Jamaica	20.38	
3rd place, bronze medalist(s)	3	Joshua J. Johnson	United States	20.54	
4	2	Marlon Devonish	Great Britain	20.74	
5	5	Christian Malcolm	Great Britain	20.77	
7	6	Kevin Little	United States	20.90	
8	3	Stéphan Buckland	Mauritius	20.92	
9	9	David Baxter	Australia	21.39	

=== 400 meters ===
September 4

Rank	Lane	Name	Nationality	Time	Notes
1st place, gold medalist(s)	5	Greg Haughton	Jamaica	45.02	
2nd place, silver medalist(s)	6	Avard Moncur	Bahamas	45.31	
3rd place, bronze medalist(s)	7	Leonard Byrd	United States	45.56	
4	4	Eric Milazar	Mauritius	45.65	
5	3	Hamdan Odha Al-Bishi	Saudi Arabia	45.86	
6	2	Sanderlei Parrela	Brazil	45.96	
7	9	Clinton Hill	Australia	46.65	
	8	Antonio Pettigrew	United States	DQ	Doping

=== 800 meters ===
September 5

Rank	Name	Nationality	Time	Notes
1st place, gold medalist(s)	William Yiampoy	Kenya	1:46.49	
2nd place, silver medalist(s)	Jean-Patrick Nduwimana	Burundi	1:46.79	
3rd place, bronze medalist(s)	Wilfred Bungei	Kenya	1:47.15	
4	Paweł Czapiewski	Poland	1:47.21	
5	David Krummenacker	United States	1:47.40	
6	Grant Cremer	Australia	1:47.64	
7	Trinity Gray	United States	1:47.71	
8	David Lelei	Kenya	1:48.44	
9	David Kiptoo	Kenya	1:52.50	

=== Mile ===
September 6

Rank	Name	Nationality	Time	Notes
1st place, gold medalist(s)	Noah Ngeny	Kenya	3:56.64	
2nd place, silver medalist(s)	Kevin Sullivan	Canada	3:56.81	
3rd place, bronze medalist(s)	Laban Rotich	Kenya	3:56.88	
4	William Chirchir	Kenya	3:56.94	
5	Bernard Lagat	Kenya	3:57.10	
6	Craig Mottram	Australia	3:58.24	
7	John Mayock	Great Britain	3:58.49	
8	Brian Berryhill	United States	4:00.26	
	Andy Downin	United States	DNF	

=== 5000 meters ===
September 6

Rank	Name	Nationality	Time	Notes
1st place, gold medalist(s)	Paul Bitok	Kenya	15:26.10	
2nd place, silver medalist(s)	Luke Kipkosgei	Kenya	15:26.61	
3rd place, bronze medalist(s)	John Kibowen	Kenya	15:26.63	
4	Hailu Mekonnen	Ethiopia	15:26.70	
5	Sammy Kipketer	Kenya	15:27.94	
6	Richard Limo	Kenya	15:28.00	
7	Million Wolde	Ethiopia	15:30.51	
	Michael Power	Australia	DNS	

=== 10,000 meters ===
September 7

Rank	Name	Nationality	Time	Notes
1st place, gold medalist(s)	Assefa Mezgebu	Ethiopia	28:06.48	
2nd place, silver medalist(s)	Benjamin Maiyo	Kenya	28:06.80	
3rd place, bronze medalist(s)	Albert Chepkurui	Kenya	28:06.86	
4	Yibeltal Admassu	Ethiopia	28:07.53	
5	Abdihakem Abdirahman	United States	28:08.02	
6	Aloÿs Nizigama	Burundi	28:35.91	
7	Shaun Creighton	Australia	29:06.70	
8	John Henwood	New Zealand	29:16.70	

=== 110 meters hurdles ===
September 5

Rank	Lane	Name	Nationality	Time	Notes
1st place, gold medalist(s)	6	Allen Johnson	United States	13.16	
2nd place, silver medalist(s)	5	Anier García	Cuba	13.20	
3rd place, bronze medalist(s)	4	Larry Wade	United States	13.46	
4	8	Terrence Trammell	United States	13.49	
5	9	Colin Jackson	Great Britain	13.63	
6	2	Mark Crear	United States	13.63	
7	3	Dudley Dorival	Haiti	13.64	
8	7	Dawane Wallace	United States	13.68	
9	1	Stuart Anderson	Australia	14.11	

=== 400 meters hurdles ===
September 4

Rank	Lane	Name	Nationality	Time	Notes
1st place, gold medalist(s)	5	Félix Sánchez	Dominican Republic	48.47	
2nd place, silver medalist(s)	3	Llewellyn Herbert	South Africa	48.93	
3rd place, bronze medalist(s)	7	Hadi Soua'an Al-Somaily	Saudi Arabia	48.94	
4	8	Boris Gorban	Russia	48.98	
5	4	Paweł Januszewski	Poland	49.27	
6	2	Calvin Davis	United States	50.14	
7	9	Blair Young	Australia	50.79	
	6	Angelo Taylor	United States	DNS	

=== 3000 meters steeplechase ===
September 5

Rank	Name	Nationality	Time	Notes
1st place, gold medalist(s)	Brahim Boulami	Morocco	8:17.73	
2nd place, silver medalist(s)	Reuben Kosgei	Kenya	8:18.63	
3rd place, bronze medalist(s)	Stephen Cherono	Kenya	8:19.98	
4	Bouabdellah Tahri	France	8:20.25	
5	Tim Broe	United States	8:20.75	
6	Luis Miguel Martín	Spain	8:24.03	
7	Raymond Yator	Kenya	8:27.19	
8	Tom Chorny	United States	9:24.26	

=== 4 × 100 meters relay ===
September 7

Rank	Nation	Competitors	Time	Notes
1st place, gold medalist(s)	Great Britain	Jonathan Barbour, Christian Malcolm, Marlon Devonish, Dwain Chambers	38.71	
2nd place, silver medalist(s)	Jamaica	Maurice Wignall, Julien Dunkley, Raymond Stewart, Christopher Williams	38.92	
3rd place, bronze medalist(s)	Australia	Matt Shirvington, Paul Di Bella, Steve Brimacombe, Adam Basil	39.12	
4	Cuba	José Ángel César, Luis Alberto Pérez-Rionda, Iván García, Juan Pita	39.61	
	United States	Kevin Little, Terrence Trammell, Dennis Mitchell, Joshua J. Johnson	DQ	

=== 4 × 400 meters relay ===
September 7

Rank	Nation	Competitors	Time	Notes
1st place, gold medalist(s)	Jamaica	Michael McDonald, Danny McFarlane, Ian Weakley, Michael Blackwood	3:01.57	
2nd place, silver medalist(s)	Bahamas	Tim Munnings, Troy McIntosh, Carl Oliver, Avard Moncur	3:01.67	
3rd place, bronze medalist(s)	Poland	Rafał Wieruszewski, Jacek Bocian, Filip Walotka, Paweł Januszewski	3:04.79	
4	Australia	Michael Rehardt, Paul Pearce, Blair Young, Clinton Hill	3:05.20	
	United States	Leonard Byrd, Derrick Brew, Antonio Pettigrew, Michael Johnson	DQ	

=== 20,000 meters walk ===
September 4

Rank	Name	Nationality	Time	Notes
1st place, gold medalist(s)	Nathan Deakes	Australia	1:19:48.1	GR
2nd place, silver medalist(s)	Robert Korzeniowski	Poland	1:19:52.0	
3rd place, bronze medalist(s)	Roman Rasskazov	Russia	1:21:09.0	
4	Viktor Burayev	Russia	1:21:29.2	
5	Ilya Markov	Russia	1:22:09.8	
6	Juan Manuel Molina	Spain	1:22:31.8	
7	Vladimir Andreyev	Russia	1:24:08.1	
8	Curt Clausen	United States	1:29:03.6	

=== High jump ===
September 7

Rank	Name	Nationality	2.20	2.24	2.28	2.31	2.33	2.35	Result	Notes
1st place, gold medalist(s)	Stefan Holm	Sweden	o	xo	o	xo	o	xxx	2.33	
2nd place, silver medalist(s)	Vyacheslav Voronin	Russia	–	o	xxo	o	xxx		2.31	
3rd place, bronze medalist(s)	Yaroslav Rybakov	Russia	o	o	xo	xo	xxx		2.31	
4	Mark Boswell	Canada	o	o	–	xxo	xxx		2.31	
5	Javier Sotomayor	Cuba	o	–	o	xxx			2.28	
6	Nathan Leeper	United States	xo	xxo	xxx				2.24	
7	Sergey Klyugin	Russia	o	xxx					2.20	
8	Nick Moroney	Australia	xxo	xxx					2.20	

=== Pole vault ===
September 7

Rank	Name	Nationality	5.45	5.60	5.75	5.80	5.85	Result	Notes
1st place, gold medalist(s)	Tim Mack	United States	xo	xo	xo	o	xxx	5.80	
2nd place, silver medalist(s)	Aleksandr Averbukh	Israel	–	o	–	xo	xxx	5.80	
3rd place, bronze medalist(s)	Dmitri Markov	Australia	–	o	xo	–	xxx	5.75	
4	Jeff Hartwig	United States	–	o	xxx			5.60	
5	Christian Tamminga	Netherlands	xo	o	–	xxx		5.60	
6	Viktor Chistiakov	Australia	–	xxo	xxx			5.60	
	Nick Hysong	United States	–	xxx				NM	

=== Long jump ===
September 6

Rank	Name	Nationality	#1	#2	#3	#4	#5	#6	Result	Notes
1st place, gold medalist(s)	Iván Pedroso	Cuba	x	7.76	7.77	x	8.16	8.16	8.16	
2nd place, silver medalist(s)	James Beckford	Jamaica	7.38	x	7.93	x	7.98	8.07	8.07	
3rd place, bronze medalist(s)	Hussain Al-Sabee	Saudi Arabia	x	7.65	7.56	x	7.94	7.97	7.97	
4	Kevin Dilworth	United States	7.81	5.88	7.70	5.99	7.76	7.97	7.97	
5	Luis Méliz	Cuba	7.49	7.88	7.73	x	5.89	7.73	7.88	
6	Olexiy Lukashevych	Ukraine	7.56	x	7.48	7.56	7.80	7.87	7.87	
7	Roman Shchurenko	Ukraine	7.74	x	x	–	7.19	7.76	7.76	
8	Danil Burkenya	Russia	7.65	7.57	7.67	7.41	x	x	7.67	
9	Savanté Stringfellow	United States	7.42	7.52	7.61	x	7.58	x	7.61	

=== Triple jump ===
September 4

Rank	Name	Nationality	#1	#2	#3	#4	#5	#6	Result	Notes
1st place, gold medalist(s)	Jonathan Edwards	Great Britain	x	16.03	x	17.26	–	x	17.26	
2nd place, silver medalist(s)	Christian Olsson	Sweden	16.65	16.85	16.77	x	–	x	16.85	
3rd place, bronze medalist(s)	LaMark Carter	United States	16.27	16.40	16.62	16.59	16.65	16.83	16.83	
4	Andrew Murphy	Australia	16.52	16.53	x	16.38	16.48	16.37	16.53	
5	Larry Achike	Great Britain	16.36	x	x	x	x	16.16	16.36	
6	Igor Spasovkhodskiy	Russia	15.80	16.20	–	15.57	–	15.67	16.20	
7	Brian Wellman	Bermuda	15.81	x	15.59	15.97	–	x	15.97	

=== Shot put ===
September 7

Rank	Name	Nationality	#1	#2	#3	#4	#5	#6	Result	Notes
1st place, gold medalist(s)	Adam Nelson	United States	20.35	20.80	20.79	20.91	x	20.12	20.91	
2nd place, silver medalist(s)	John Godina	United States	20.76	20.63	x	x	20.32	x	20.76	
3rd place, bronze medalist(s)	Manuel Martínez	Spain	20.44	20.26	x	20.27	19.92	x	20.44	
4	Arsi Harju	Finland	x	19.50	19.50	19.72	19.88	x	19.88	
5	John Davis	United States	18.15	19.55	18.91	x	x	x	19.55	
6	Andy Bloom	United States	18.86	19.51	x	x	x	x	19.51	
7	Justin Anlezark	Australia	19.42	18.53	18.56	18.75	19.03	18.80	19.42	
8	Pavel Chumachenko	Russia	x	19.34	x	x	18.41	x	19.34	

=== Discus throw ===
September 5

Rank	Name	Nationality	#1	#2	#3	#4	#5	#6	Result	Notes
1st place, gold medalist(s)	Frantz Kruger	South Africa	63.48	67.84	67.07	62.42	66.66	63.44	67.84	GR
2nd place, silver medalist(s)	Virgilijus Alekna	Lithuania	64.58	64.78	66.07	x	65.01	64.49	66.07	
3rd place, bronze medalist(s)	Dmitriy Shevchenko	Russia	60.22	63.53	60.83	61.49	62.01	–	63.53	
4	Adam Setliff	United States	57.43	61.30	61.68	63.01	x	x	63.01	
5	Vasiliy Kaptyukh	Belarus	58.47	59.99	61.81	61.10	61.98	62.52	62.52	
6	Aleksander Tammert	Estonia	60.12	61.70	x	62.10	62.43	60.55	62.43	
7	Jason Tunks	Canada	59.20	61.70	x	x	x	61.27	61.70	
8	John Godina	United States	x	60.64	61.05	59.90	x	x	61.05	
9	Andy Bloom	United States	54.71	x	54.25	58.00	x	x	58.00	

=== Hammer throw ===
September 7

Rank	Name	Nationality	#1	#2	#3	#4	#5	#6	Result	Notes
1st place, gold medalist(s)	Koji Murofushi	Japan	x	79.17	80.13	80.91	82.94	81.67	82.94	
2nd place, silver medalist(s)	Szymon Ziółkowski	Poland	77.08	78.58	79.23	79.23	80.71	80.25	80.71	
3rd place, bronze medalist(s)	Balázs Kiss	Hungary	x	76.80	77.39	79.51	x	x	79.51	
4	Nicola Vizzoni	Italy	79.23	77.58	77.39	x	78.56	78.63	79.23	
5	Ilya Konovalov	Russia	75.31	76.05	75.88	75.28	72.87	–	76.05	
6	Igor Astapkovich	Belarus	74.55	74.85	x	73.98	x	x	74.85	
7	Kevin McMahon	United States	69.90	70.09	69.87	69.73	x	x	70.09	

=== Javelin throw ===
September 6

Rank	Name	Nationality	#1	#2	#3	#4	#5	#6	Result	Notes
1st place, gold medalist(s)	Jan Železný	Czech Republic	x	82.85	x	87.52	x	x	87.52	GR
2nd place, silver medalist(s)	Breaux Greer	United States	81.32	80.74	80.73	x	x	85.86	85.86	
3rd place, bronze medalist(s)	Ēriks Rags	Latvia	80.19	78.85	82.11	80.05	82.60	84.68	84.68	
4	Steve Backley	Great Britain	81.47	83.34	81.41	x	80.19	x	83.34	
5	Boris Henry	Germany	80.98	x	82.34	81.91	x	x	82.34	
6	Andrew Currey	Australia	81.44	x	77.29	80.17	77.92	77.60	81.44	
7	Raymond Hecht	Germany	75.85	78.68	78.10	x	74.01	76.42	78.68	
	Emeterio González	Cuba							DNS	

=== Decathlon ===
September 6–7

The highest mark recorded in each event is highlighted in yellow

Rank	Athlete	Nationality	100m	LJ	SP	HJ	400m	110m H	DT	PV	JT	1500m	Points	Notes
1st place, gold medalist(s)	Tomáš Dvořák	Czech Republic	10.78	7.61	16.16	1.97	48.77	13.98	47.62	4.70	69.22	4:46.58	8514	
2nd place, silver medalist(s)	Erki Nool	Estonia	10.73	7.35	14.46	1.94	47.44	14.82	42.56	5.40	68.83	4:42.81	8420	
3rd place, bronze medalist(s)	Tom Pappas	United States	10.84	7.24	15.30	2.18	50.27	14.05	45.43	4.90	62.19	4:57.10	8323	
4	Lev Lobodin	Russia	10.93	7.26	15.83	2.03	49.73	14.25	47.33	5.00	53.61	4:42.19	8227	
5	Phillip McMullen	United States	11.42	6.72	14.88	1.91	50.17	15.02	47.90	5.00	56.81	4:28.68	7856	
6	Jiří Ryba	Czech Republic	11.31	6.82	13.09	1.97	49.08	14.65	43.88	4.80	55.21	4:34.64	7736	
7	Michael Nolan	Canada	11.57	6.79	15.15	1.88	50.50	15.32	52.64	4.80	51.36	4:46.34	7625	
8	Kip Janvrin	United States	11.26	6.63	13.31	1.82	49.11	14.94	40.68	NM	57.65	4:57.26	6531	

== Women's results ==
=== 100 meters ===
September 4

Rank	Lane	Name	Nationality	Time	Notes
1st place, gold medalist(s)	6	Marion Jones	United States	10.84	GR
2nd place, silver medalist(s)	5	Zhanna Pintusevich-Block	Ukraine	11.01	
3rd place, bronze medalist(s)	7	Chandra Sturrup	Bahamas	11.13	
4	4	Chryste Gaines	United States	11.14	
5	9	Glory Alozie	Spain	11.27	
6	3	Debbie Ferguson	Bahamas	11.34	
7	8	Inger Miller	United States	11.37	
8	2	Lauren Hewitt	Australia	11.50	

=== 200 meters ===
September 5

Rank	Lane	Name	Nationality	Time	Notes
1st place, gold medalist(s)	6	Debbie Ferguson	Bahamas	22.80	
2nd place, silver medalist(s)	5	Kelli White	United States	23.05	
3rd place, bronze medalist(s)	3	Juliet Campbell	Jamaica	23.17	
4	4	Myriam Léonie Mani	Cameroon	23.18	
5	7	Beverly McDonald	Jamaica	23.34	
6	8	Mercy Nku	Nigeria	23.41	
7	9	Alenka Bikar	Slovenia	23.47	
8	2	Lauren Hewitt	Australia	23.81	

=== 400 meters ===
September 4

Rank	Lane	Name	Nationality	Time	Notes
1st place, gold medalist(s)	6	Ana Guevara	Mexico	50.32	
2nd place, silver medalist(s)	4	Lorraine Fenton	Jamaica	50.76	
3rd place, bronze medalist(s)	5	Amy Mbacké Thiam	Senegal	51.25	
4	3	Jearl Miles Clark	United States	51.44	
5	9	Sandie Richards	Jamaica	51.80	
6	2	Michele Collins	United States	51.85	
7	7	Olesya Zykina	Russia	52.11	
8	8	Kaltouma Nadjina	Chad	52.16	

=== 800 meters ===
September 5

Rank	Name	Nationality	Time	Notes
1st place, gold medalist(s)	Maria Mutola	Mozambique	1:58.76	
2nd place, silver medalist(s)	Kelly Holmes	Great Britain	1:59.27	
3rd place, bronze medalist(s)	Stephanie Graf	Austria	2:00.93	
4	Zulia Calatayud	Cuba	2:00.94	
5	Faith Macharia	Kenya	2:01.57	
6	Jolanda Čeplak	Slovenia	2:01.78	
7	Svetlana Cherkasova	Russia	2:04.48	
8	Tamsyn Lewis	Australia	2:05.79	

=== Mile ===
September 6

Rank	Name	Nationality	Time	Notes
1st place, gold medalist(s)	Violeta Szekely	Romania	4:38.03	
2nd place, silver medalist(s)	Tatyana Tomashova	Russia	4:38.13	
3rd place, bronze medalist(s)	Carla Sacramento	Portugal	4:39.18	
4	Lidia Chojecka	Poland	4:39.96	
5	Lyudmila Vasilyeva	Russia	4:40.79	
6	Sarah Schwald	United States	4:41.01	
7	Naomi Mugo	Kenya	4:41.32	
8	Georgie Clarke	Australia	4:43.84	

=== 5000 meters ===
September 4

Rank	Name	Nationality	Time	Notes
1st place, gold medalist(s)	Olga Yegorova	Russia	15:12.22	
2nd place, silver medalist(s)	Berhane Adere	Ethiopia	15:12.97	
3rd place, bronze medalist(s)	Kathy Butler	Great Britain	15:17.96	
4	Benita Willis	Australia	15:22.31	
5	Susie Power	Australia	15:23.87	
6	Naomi Mugo	Kenya	15:33.02	
7	Mardrea Hyman	Jamaica	16:03.71	

=== 10,000 meters ===
September 7

Rank	Name	Nationality	Time	Notes
1st place, gold medalist(s)	Derartu Tulu	Ethiopia	31:48.19	GR
2nd place, silver medalist(s)	Ayelech Worku	Ethiopia	31:48.57	
3rd place, bronze medalist(s)	Susie Power	Australia	31:50.36	
4	Lyudmila Biktasheva	Russia	31:54.06	
5	Kathy Butler	Great Britain	32:18.36	
6	Ejegayehu Dibaba	Ethiopia	32:24.20	
7	Kerryn McCann	Australia	32:43.67	
8	Kimberly Fitchen	United States	33:37.39	

=== 100 meters hurdles ===
September 4

Rank	Lane	Name	Nationality	Time	Notes
1st place, gold medalist(s)	5	Gail Devers	United States	12.61	
2nd place, silver medalist(s)	4	Jenny Adams	United States	12.87	
3rd place, bronze medalist(s)	6	Anjanette Kirkland	United States	12.92	
4	7	Glory Alozie	Spain	12.96	
5	8	Dionne Rose-Henley	Jamaica	13.01	
6	9	Melissa Morrison	United States	13.08	
7	3	Vonette Dixon	Jamaica	13.12	
8	2	Jacquie Munro	Australia	13.22	

=== 400 meters hurdles ===
September 5

Rank	Lane	Name	Nationality	Time	Notes
1st place, gold medalist(s)	3	Tetyana Tereshchuk-Antipova	Ukraine	54.47	
2nd place, silver medalist(s)	8	Tonja Buford-Bailey	United States	54.75	
3rd place, bronze medalist(s)	7	Yuliya Nosova	Russia	55.27	
4	4	Debbie-Ann Parris	Jamaica	56.03	
5	5	Nezha Bidouane	Morocco	56.10	
6	6	Daimí Pernía	Cuba	56.32	
7	9	Sonia Brito	Australia	56.73	
8	2	Sandra Glover	United States	1:54.52	

=== 3000 meters steeplechase ===
September 4

Rank	Name	Nationality	Time	Notes
1st place, gold medalist(s)	Melissa Rollison	Australia	9:30.70	GR
2nd place, silver medalist(s)	Irene Limika	Kenya	9:39.65	
3rd place, bronze medalist(s)	Yekaterina Volkova	Russia	9:41.54	
4	Elizabeth Jackson	United States	9:41.94	
5	Cristina Iloc-Casandra	Romania	9:46.56	
6	Lisa Nye	United States	9:53.97	

=== 4 × 100 meters relay ===
September 7

Rank	Nation	Competitors	Time	Notes
1st place, gold medalist(s)	World Select team	Glory Alozie, Mercy Nku, Myriam Léonie Mani, Zhanna Pintusevich-Block	42.95	
2nd place, silver medalist(s)	United States	Jenny Adams, Kelli White, Inger Miller, Chryste Gaines	42.98	
3rd place, bronze medalist(s)	Jamaica	Astia Walker, Juliet Campbell, Beverly McDonald, Merlene Frazer	43.13	
4	Russia	Olga Khalandyreva, Irina Khabarova, Marina Kislova, Larisa Kruglova	44.40	
5	Australia	Bindee Goon Chew, Rachel Jackson, Lauren Hewitt, Sarah Mulan	45.00	

=== 4 × 400 meters relay ===
September 7

Rank	Nation	Competitors	Time	Notes
1st place, gold medalist(s)	United States	Jearl Miles Clark, Monique Hennagan, Michele Collins, Suziann Reid	3:24.63	
2nd place, silver medalist(s)	Jamaica	Sandie Richards, Catherine Scott, Debbie-Ann Parris, Lorraine Fenton	3:24.87	
3rd place, bronze medalist(s)	World Select team	Daimí Pernía, Zulia Calatayud, Kaltouma Nadjina, Ana Guevara	3:28.07	
4	Russia	Natalya Shevtsova, Irina Rosikhina, Anastasiya Kapachinskaya, Olesya Zykina	3:30.49	
5	Australia	Rebecca Sadler, Sonia Brito, Renee Robson, Tamsyn Lewis	3:30.94	

=== 20,000 meters walk ===
September 6

Rank	Name	Nationality	Time	Notes
1st place, gold medalist(s)	Olimpiada Ivanova	Russia	1:26:52.3	WR
2nd place, silver medalist(s)	Yelena Nikolayeva	Russia	1:27:49.3	
3rd place, bronze medalist(s)	Eva Pérez	Spain	1:32:22.4	
4	Valentina Tsybulskaya	Belarus	1:33:25.5	
5	Kerry Saxby-Junna	Australia	1:33:40.2	
6	Jill Zenner	United States	1:43:33.4	

=== High jump ===
September 6

Rank	Name	Nationality	1.85	1.89	1.93	1.97	2.00	2.05	Result	Notes
1st place, gold medalist(s)	Hestrie Cloete	South Africa	o	o	o	o	o	xxx	2.00	
2nd place, silver medalist(s)	Kajsa Bergqvist	Sweden	o	o	o	xo	xxx		1.97	
3rd place, bronze medalist(s)	Vita Palamar	Ukraine	o	o	xo	xxx			1.93	
3rd place, bronze medalist(s)	Amy Acuff	United States	o	o	xo	xxx			1.93	
5	Blanka Vlašić	Croatia	o	o	xxo	xxx			1.93	
6	Dóra Győrffy	Hungary	o	xo	xxx				1.89	
7	Venelina Veneva	Bulgaria	xo	xxo	xxx				1.89	
8	Yelena Yelesina	Russia	o	xxx					1.85	

=== Pole vault ===
September 5

Rank	Name	Nationality	4.05	4.20	4.35	4.45	4.55	4.70	Result	Notes
1st place, gold medalist(s)	Stacy Dragila	United States	–	o	o	o	xxo	xxx	4.55	GR
2nd place, silver medalist(s)	Svetlana Feofanova	Russia	–	o	xo	o	xxx		4.45	
3rd place, bronze medalist(s)	Tatiana Grigorieva	Australia	–	o	o	xo	xxx		4.45	
4	Monika Pyrek	Poland	xo	o	xxo	xxx			4.35	
5	Kellie Suttle	United States	o	xxo	xxx				4.20	
6	Mary Sauer	United States	xo	xxo	xxx				4.20	
7	Melissa Mueller	United States	xo	xxx					4.05	
	Jenny Dryburgh	New Zealand							DNS	

=== Long jump ===
September 7

Rank	Name	Nationality	#1	#2	#3	#4	#5	#6	Result	Notes
1st place, gold medalist(s)	Maurren Maggi	Brazil	6.33	6.81	6.83	6.56	6.72	6.94	6.94	
2nd place, silver medalist(s)	Bronwyn Thompson	Australia	6.78	6.52	6.65	4.99	6.88	6.01	6.88	
3rd place, bronze medalist(s)	Tatyana Kotova	Russia	6.74	4.97	6.73	6.84	6.59	x	6.84	
4	Olga Rublyova	Russia	6.55	x	6.59	x	6.81	x	6.81	
5	Niurka Montalvo	Spain	x	x	x	6.78	x	x	6.78	
6	Nicole Boegman	Australia	6.71	x	x	x	x	6.51	6.71	
7	Chantal Brunner	New Zealand	6.17	5.78	6.28	3.98	6.06	6.12	6.28	
8	DeDee Nathan	United States	6.18	6.20	6.08	6.02	–	–	6.20	

=== Triple jump ===
September 6

Rank	Name	Nationality	#1	#2	#3	#4	#5	#6	Result	Notes
1st place, gold medalist(s)	Tatyana Lebedeva	Russia	14.28	14.36	14.58	14.30	x	14.45	14.58	
2nd place, silver medalist(s)	Tereza Marinova	Bulgaria	14.37	x	x	14.11	14.14	14.11	14.37	
3rd place, bronze medalist(s)	Olena Hovorova	Ukraine	14.12	x	13.83	14.09	14.17	14.25	14.25	
4	Magdelín Martínez	Italy	x	14.12	14.10	x	x	x	14.12	
5	Yelena Oleynikova	Russia	13.94	13.72	13.74	13.72	13.47	13.81	13.94	
6	Tiombe Hurd	United States	13.01	x	x	13.10	13.40	x	13.40	
7	Nicole Mladenis	Australia	13.32	x	x	13.11	x	13.19	13.32	
8	Heli Koivula	Finland	x	13.23	x	13.13	x	x	13.23	

=== Shot put ===
September 5

Rank	Name	Nationality	#1	#2	#3	#4	#5	#6	Result	Notes
1st place, gold medalist(s)	Larisa Peleshenko	Russia	18.07	18.46	x	x	x	18.65	18.65	
2nd place, silver medalist(s)	Yumileidi Cumbá	Cuba	x	18.37	x	x	x	18.41	18.41	
3rd place, bronze medalist(s)	Krystyna Danilczyk-Zabawska	Poland	17.33	18.23	x	17.54	17.54	x	18.23	
4	Astrid Kumbernuss	Germany	16.03	18.09	x	x	x	x	18.09	
5	Yanina Korolchik	Belarus	17.66	16.85	17.88	17.66	x	17.74	17.88	
6	Svetlana Krivelyova	Russia	16.29	17.60	17.37	16.88	17.46	17.73	17.73	
7	Lieja Koeman	Netherlands	x	17.72	17.54	x	x	17.57	17.72	
8	Connie Price-Smith	United States	16.63	x	x	x	16.42	x	16.63	
9	Seilala Sua	United States	16.19	16.52	x	16.48	x	x	16.52	

=== Discus throw ===
September 6

Rank	Name	Nationality	#1	#2	#3	#4	#5	#6	Result	Notes
1st place, gold medalist(s)	Ellina Zvereva	Belarus	61.16	65.61	x	x	66.36	65.86	66.36	
2nd place, silver medalist(s)	Natalya Sadova	Russia	x	63.68	64.11	62.69	61.91	63.10	64.11	
3rd place, bronze medalist(s)	Franka Dietzsch	Germany	62.59	x	x	61.33	61.34	x	62.59	
4	Kris Kuehl	United States	60.39	62.39	x	x	62.05	61.60	62.39	
5	Seilala Sua	United States	59.17	x	58.59	61.70	x	x	61.70	
6	Iryna Yatchenko	Belarus	59.31	59.30	x	x	x	59.74	59.74	
7	Alison Lever	Australia	55.94	56.28	x	x	57.19	58.84	58.84	
8	Monique Nacsa	Australia	x	x	53.54	52.04	52.42	53.70	53.70	

=== Hammer throw ===
September 4

Rank	Name	Nationality	#1	#2	#3	#4	#5	#6	Result	Notes
1st place, gold medalist(s)	Kamila Skolimowska	Poland	66.39	70.31	x	x	x	x	70.31	
2nd place, silver medalist(s)	Olga Kuzenkova	Russia	67.51	69.98	x	x	x	x	69.98	
3rd place, bronze medalist(s)	Manuela Montebrun	France	67.99	67.03	69.55	69.80	67.67	x	69.80	
4	Yipsi Moreno	Cuba	x	67.83	67.65	x	x	x	67.83	
5	Bronwyn Eagles	Australia	x	60.78	x	65.15	64.44	65.38	65.38	
6	Lyudmila Gubkina	Belarus	61.31	63.85	62.75	62.27	63.84	64.24	64.24	
7	Dawn Ellerbe	United States	x	x	53.97	61.21	61.51	61.16	61.51	
8	Karyne Di Marco	Australia	60.65	56.68	54.48	57.76	60.33	60.54	60.65	

=== Javelin throw ===
September 4

Rank	Name	Nationality	#1	#2	#3	#4	#5	#6	Result	Notes
1st place, gold medalist(s)	Osleidys Menéndez	Cuba	63.32	66.14	63.48	64.12	63.78	x	66.14	
2nd place, silver medalist(s)	Nikola Tomečková	Czech Republic	58.73	62.22	63.95	x	x	64.70	64.70	
3rd place, bronze medalist(s)	Mikaela Ingberg	Finland	55.23	60.01	60.68	60.24	60.46	60.59	60.68	
4	Tatyana Shikolenko	Russia	57.85	57.18	x	x	x	x	57.85	
5	Kim Kreiner	United States	47.10	53.08	49.32	48.96	x	50.06	53.08	

=== Heptathlon ===
September 4–5

The highest mark recorded in each event is highlighted in yellow

Rank	Athlete	Nationality	100m H	HJ	SP	200m	LJ	JT	800m	Points	Notes
1st place, gold medalist(s)	Natalya Roshchupkina	Russia	13.98	1.77	14.35	23.49	6.16	45.25	2:11.93	6373	
2nd place, silver medalist(s)	Yelena Prokhorova	Russia	13.79	1.80	12.62	24.65	6.34	49.31	2:11.52	6352	
3rd place, bronze medalist(s)	Natallia Sazanovich	Belarus	13.44	1.80	14.77	24.43	6.33	44.97	2:22.85	6323	
4	DeDee Nathan	United States	13.50	1.74	14.59	24.54	6.32	44.67	2:17.79	6275	
5	Larissa Netšeporuk	Estonia	14.30	1.74	13.56	25.33	6.16	48.00	2:21.55	5984	
6	Jane Jamieson	Australia	14.10	1.80	13.55	25.29	5.90	45.51	2:29.06	5863	
7	Claire Thompson	Australia	13.98	1.68	11.72	25.62	5.62	39.62	2:28.66	5390	
