= 2001 World Championships in Athletics – Women's hammer throw =

The final of the Women's Hammer Throw event at the 2001 World Championships in Edmonton, Alberta, Canada was held on Tuesday August 7, 2001. There were a total number of 34 participating athletes. The qualifying rounds were staged on Monday August 6, with the mark set at 67.00 metres.

== Medalists ==
Gold	Yipsi Moreno; Cuba (CUB)
Silver	Olga Kuzenkova; Russia (RUS)
Bronze	Bronwyn Eagles; Australia (AUS)

== Schedule ==
- All times are Mountain Standard Time (UTC-7)

Qualification Round
Group A	Group B
06.08.2001 – 13:00h	06.08.2001 – 14:50h
Final Round
07.08.2001 – 20:05h

== Startlist ==
Order	№	Athlete	Season Best	Personal Best
GROUP A
1	202	Marwa Hussein (EGY)	62.16	62.16
2	29	Karyne Di Marco (AUS)	64.32	65.38
3	758	Martina Danišová (SVK)	68.50	68.50
4	685	Olga Kuzenkova (RUS)	73.62	75.68
5	193	Lucie Vrbenská (CZE)	65.41	65.41
6	278	Manuela Montebrun (FRA)	70.28	71.18
7	253	Mia Strömmer (FIN)	69.63	69.63
8	424	Ester Balassini (ITA)	68.50	68.50
9	841	Melissa Price (USA)	66.25	66.25
10	348	Kirsten Münchow (GER)	68.09	69.28
11	371	Evdokia Tsamoglou (GRE)	65.83	65.83
12	66	Lyudmila Gubkina (BLR)	65.57	69.92
13	608	Agnieszka Pogroszewska (POL)	67.98	67.98
14	170	Ivana Brkljačić (CRO)	66.49	68.18
15	838	Anna Norgren (USA)	66.88	66.88
16	141	Zhang Wenxiu (CHN)	66.30	66.30
17	463	Masumi Aya (JPN)	62.13	62.13
GROUP B
1	340	Susanne Keil (GER)	68.07	68.07
2	594	Tasha Williams (NZL)	65.91	65.91
3	206	Nancy Guillén (ESA)	62.43	62.43
4	313	Lorraine Shaw (GBR)	68.15	68.15
5	819	Dawn Ellerbe (USA)	70.62	70.62
6	763	Cecilia Nilsson (SWE)	64.53	64.53
7	252	Sini Pöyry (FIN)	66.31	66.31
8	71	Olga Tsander (BLR)	68.94	69.81
9	187	Markéta Hajdu (CZE)	65.91	65.91
10	22	Bronwyn Eagles (AUS)	68.83	68.83
11	182	Yipsi Moreno (CUB)	70.41	70.41
12	19	Lisa Misipeka (ASA)	67.00	67.55
13	614	Kamila Skolimowska (POL)	68.48	71.16
14	264	Florence Ezeh (FRA)	66.85	66.85
15	126	Caroline Wittrin (CAN)	62.03	63.47
16	15	Karina Moya (ARG)	62.16	62.16
17	627	Vânia Silva (POR)	63.64	63.64

== Abbreviations ==
- All results shown are in metres

Q	automatic qualification
q	qualification by rank
DNS	did not start
NM	no mark
WR	world record
AR	area record
NR	national record
PB	personal best
SB	season best

== Records ==
Standing records prior to the 2001 World Athletics Championships
World Record	Mihaela Melinte (ROM)	76.07 m	August 29, 1999	Rüdlingen, Switzerland
Event Record	Mihaela Melinte (ROM)	75.20 m	August 24, 1999	Seville, Spain
Season Best	Olga Kuzenkova (RUS)	73.62 m	February 24, 2001	Adler, Russia

== Qualification ==
=== Group A ===
Rank	Overall	Athlete	Attempts			Distance
Rank	Overall	Athlete	1	2	3	Distance
1	1	Olga Kuzenkova (RUS)	70.43	—	—	70.43 m
2	3	Manuela Montebrun (FRA)	67.92	—	—	67.92 m
3	7	Kirsten Münchow (GER)	65.69	X	63.77	65.69 m
4	8	Melissa Price (USA)	65.65	62.54	X	65.65 m
5	10	Ivana Brkljačić (CRO)	63.47	63.79	65.01	65.01 m
6	11	Zhang Wenxiu (CHN)	64.52	X	61.05	64.52 m
7	17	Anna Norgren (USA)	X	63.26	63.74	63.74 m
8	18	Agnieszka Pogroszewska (POL)	X	63.59	X	63.59 m
9	19	Lyudmila Gubkina (BLR)	61.63	63.58	X	63.58 m
10	21	Evdokia Tsamoglou (GRE)	61.50	60.00	61.97	61.97 m
11	23	Martina Danisová (SVK)	57.25	60.79	61.26	61.26 m
12	24	Mia Strömmer (FIN)	60.52	X	61.04	61.04 m
13	25	Lucie Vrbenská (CZE)	X	56.76	60.01	60.01 m
14	26	Karyne Di Marco (AUS)	59.42	X	59.80	59.80 m
15	29	Masumi Aya (JPN)	58.84	56.89	58.70	58.84 m
16	30	Marwa Hussein (EGY)	54.50	58.41	X	58.41 m
—	—	Ester Balassini (ITA)	X	X	X	NM

=== Group B ===
Rank	Overall	Athlete	Attempts			Distance
Rank	Overall	Athlete	1	2	3	Distance
1	2	Bronwyn Eagles (AUS)	68.35	—	—	68.35 m
2	4	Kamila Skolimowska (POL)	67.43	—	—	67.43 m
3	5	Yipsi Moreno (CUB)	65.01	X	66.60	66.60 m
4	6	Florence Ezeh (FRA)	65.71	61.92	65.57	65.71 m
5	9	Olga Tsander (BLR)	65.18	62.24	X	65.18 m
6	12	Lorraine Shaw (GBR)	64.37	X	63.61	64.37 m
7	13	Dawn Ellerbe (USA)	64.34	63.66	61.62	64.34 m
8	14	Susanne Keil (GER)	64.06	X	X	64.06 m
9	15	Tasha Williams (NZL)	62.09	63.79	63.83	63.83 m
10	16	Sini Pöyry (FIN)	61.59	63.76	X	63.76 m
11	20	Lisa Misipeka (ASA)	X	63.34	60.73	63.34 m
12	22	Cecilia Nilsson (SWE)	61.07	61.53	59.63	61.53 m
13	27	Caroline Wittrin (CAN)	59.30	X	X	59.30 m
14	28	Vânia Silva (POR)	58.50	58.85	58.91	58.91 m
15	31	Nancy Guillén (ESA)	X	57.96	X	57.96 m
16	32	Karina Moya (ARG)	X	56.77	57.01	57.01 m
17	33	Markéta Hajdu (CZE)	53.09	55.77	X	55.77 m

== Final ==
Rank	Athlete	Attempts						Distance	Note
Rank	Athlete	1	2	3	4	5	6	Distance	Note
1st place, gold medalist(s)	Yipsi Moreno (CUB)	69.55	69.34	70.65	61.45	68.84	66.95	70.65 m	AR
2nd place, silver medalist(s)	Olga Kuzenkova (RUS)	70.61	69.94	X	X	X	69.78	70.61 m	
3rd place, bronze medalist(s)	Bronwyn Eagles (AUS)	67.62	68.87	64.64	63.81	68.17	67.43	68.87 m	
4	Kamila Skolimowska (POL)	67.74	67.88	67.07	68.05	67.93	68.02	68.05 m	
5	Manuela Montebrun (FRA)	67.78	66.82	X	X	67.74	X	67.78 m	
6	Lorraine Shaw (GBR)	64.04	65.89	63.68	63.66	64.95	62.38	65.89 m	
7	Florence Ezeh (FRA)	63.66	65.30	64.93	65.88	65.76	64.66	65.88 m	
8	Ivana Brkljačić (CRO)	65.43	X	X	X	62.94	X	65.43 m	
9	Kirsten Münchow (GER)	62.51	X	64.39				64.39 m	
10	Volha Tsander (BLR)	X	64.10	X				64.10 m	
11	Zhang Wenxiu (CHN)	61.61	60.15	60.70				61.61 m	
12	Melissa Price (USA)	61.57	60.58	59.51				61.57 m	

== See also ==
- 2000 Women's Olympic Hammer Throw (Sydney)
- 2001 Women's Summer Universiade Hammer Throw (Beijing)
- 2001 Hammer Throw Year Ranking
- 2002 Women's European Championships Hammer Throw (Munich)
- 2004 Women's Olympic Hammer Throw (Athens)
