= Athletics at the 2001 Summer Universiade – Women's hammer throw =

The Women's Hammer Throw competition at the 2001 Summer Universiade took place on August 28 (qualification round) and August 30, 2001 in Beijing, PR China.

== Medalists ==
Gold	Manuela Montebrun; France (FRA)
Silver	Yipsi Moreno; Cuba (CUB)
Bronze	Lyudmila Gubkina; Belarus (BLR)

== Abbreviations ==
- All results shown are in metres

Q	automatic qualification
q	qualification by rank
DNS	did not start
NM	no mark
WR	world record
AR	area record
NR	national record
PB	personal best
SB	season best

== Records ==
Standing records prior to the 2001 Summer Universiade
World Record	Mihaela Melinte (ROM)	76.07 m	August 29, 1999	Rüdlingen, Switzerland
Event Record	Mihaela Melinte (ROM)	74.24 m	July 9, 1999	Palma de Mallorca, Spain
Season Best	Olga Kuzenkova (RUS)	73.62 m	February 24, 2001	Adler, Russia

== Results ==
=== Qualification ===
Rank	Group	Athlete	Attempts			Distance	Note
Rank	Group	Athlete	1	2	3	Distance	Note
1	B	Yipsi Moreno (CUB)				65.41 m	
2	A	Florence Ezeh (FRA)				64.74 m	
3	B	Manuela Montebrun (FRA)				64.40 m	
4	A	Lyudmila Gubkina (BLR)				63.88 m	
5	A	Zhao Wei (CHN)				63.39 m	
6	B	Volha Tsander (BLR)				63.16 m	
7	B	Liu Yinghui (CHN)				63.13 m	
8	B	Ester Balassini (ITA)				62.77 m	
9	B	Iryna Sekachova (UKR)				62.28 m	
10	A	Evdokia Tsamoglou (GRE)				62.13 m	
11	B	Agnieszka Pogroszewska (POL)				61.98 m	
12	A	Susanne Keil (GER)				61.58 m	
13	A	Melissa Myerscough (USA)				61.06 m	
14	B	Barbara Sugar (HUN)				60.30 m	
15	B	Vânia Silva (POR)				59.41 m	
16	B	Nancy Guillén (ESA)				59.30 m	
17	B	Wendy Koolhaas (NED)				59.26 m	
18	B	Maureen Griffin (USA)				58.48 m	
19	A	Dolores Pedrares (ESP)				57.79 m	
20	A	Zübeyde Yıldız (TUR)				57.62 m	
21	A	Wang Shu-chuan (TPE)				56.50 m	
22	A	Virginia Băluţ (ROU)				56.17 m	
23	A	Liz Pidgeon (GBR)				54.29 m	
24	B	Simona Kozmus (SLO)				53.09 m	
25	A	Nia Meilani (INA)				48.17 m	
	A	Nathalie Thenor (CAN)				NM	
	B	Carla Pavan (CAN)				NM	

=== Final ===
Rank	Athlete	Attempts						Distance	Note
Rank	Athlete	1	2	3	4	5	6	Distance	Note
1st place, gold medalist(s)	Manuela Montebrun (FRA)							69.78 m	
2nd place, silver medalist(s)	Yipsi Moreno (CUB)							68.39 m	
3rd place, bronze medalist(s)	Lyudmila Gubkina (BLR)							67.97 m	
4	Volha Tsander (BLR)							65.95 m	
5	Agnieszka Pogroszewska (POL)							64.70 m	
6	Susanne Keil (GER)							64.38 m	
7	Florence Ezeh (FRA)							63.59 m	
8	Zhao Wei (CHN)							63.46 m	
9	Liu Yinghui (CHN)							63.26 m	
10	Iryna Sekachova (UKR)							62.87 m	
11	Evdokia Tsamoglou (GRE)							62.03 m	
12	Ester Balassini (ITA)							61.22 m	

== See also ==
- 2001 Hammer Throw Year Ranking
- 2001 World Championships in Athletics – Women's hammer throw
