= Strömmer =

Strömmer is a surname. Notable people with the surname include:

- Åke Strömmer (1936–2005), Swedish sports journalist
- Bertel Strömmer (1890–1962), Finnish architect
- Gunnar Strömmer (born 1972), Swedish politician
- Mia Strömmer (born 1974), Finnish female hammer thrower
