= Dawane Wallace =

American track and field hurdler (born 1976)

Personal information
- Born: October 13, 1976 (age 50) Mount Vernon, Washington, United States

Sport
- Sport: Track and field
Medal record
Representing United States
Summer Universiade
Bronze medal – third place	1999 Palma de Mallorca	110m hurdles

Dawane Wallace (born October 13, 1976) is an American track and field hurdler who competed in the 110-meter hurdles. He was a bronze medallist at the 1999 Summer Universiade and a finalist at the 2001 World Championships in Athletics. His personal record is 13.22 seconds – a time he achieved on four occasions.

Collegiately he competed for the University of Tennessee's Tennessee Volunteers track team. He also competed at the 2001 Goodwill Games and 2001 IAAF Grand Prix Final.

== International competitions ==
Year	Competition	Venue	Position	Event	Notes
1999	Universiade	Palma de Mallorca, Spain	3rd	110 m hurdles	13.59
2001	World Championships	Edmonton, Canada	7th	110 m hurdles	13.76
2001	IAAF Grand Prix Final	Melbourne, Australia	6th	110 m hurdles	13.72
2001	Goodwill Games	Brisbane, Australia	8th	110 m hurdles	13.68

== Personal records ==
- 110-meter hurdles – 13.22 (2000)
- 100-meter dash – 10.52 (2002)
- 200-meter dash – 21.34 (1999)

Indoors

- 55-meter dash – 6.40 (2001)
- 60-meter dash – 6.86 (2004)
- 200-meter dash – 21.77 (2003)
- 400-meter dash – 48.89 (1999)
- 50-meter hurdles – 6.59 (2001)
- 55-meter hurdles – 7.13 (2000)
- 60-meter hurdles – 7.58 (2002)
- All information from All-Athletics.
