= Amy Palmer =

American hammer thrower

Amy Marie Palmer (also known as Amy Christiansen Palmer; born April 20, 1975, in Tooele, Utah) is a retired female hammer thrower from the United States. Her personal best throw was 68.28 metres, achieved on April 29, 2000, in Philadelphia.

Palmer is from Grantsville, Utah. She was an All-American thrower for the BYU Cougars track and field team, placing runner-up in the shot put at the 1998 NCAA Division I Indoor Track and Field Championships and in the hammer throw at the 1998 NCAA Division I Outdoor Track and Field Championships. She also competed in the javelin and discus.

She was the bronze medalist at the 1998 Goodwill Games. At the 1999 World Championships in Athletics she competed in the earlier stages but she reached the final at the 2000 Sydney Olympics, finishing in eighth place.

== Achievements ==
| Year | Competition | Venue | Position | Notes |
Representing the United States
| 1998 | Goodwill Games | Uniondale, United States | 3rd | 66.33 m |
| 1999 | World Championships | Seville, Spain | 17th (q) | 59.80 m |
| 2000 | Olympic Games | Sydney, Australia | 8th | 66.15 m |
