= Manuela Montebrun =

French hammer thrower

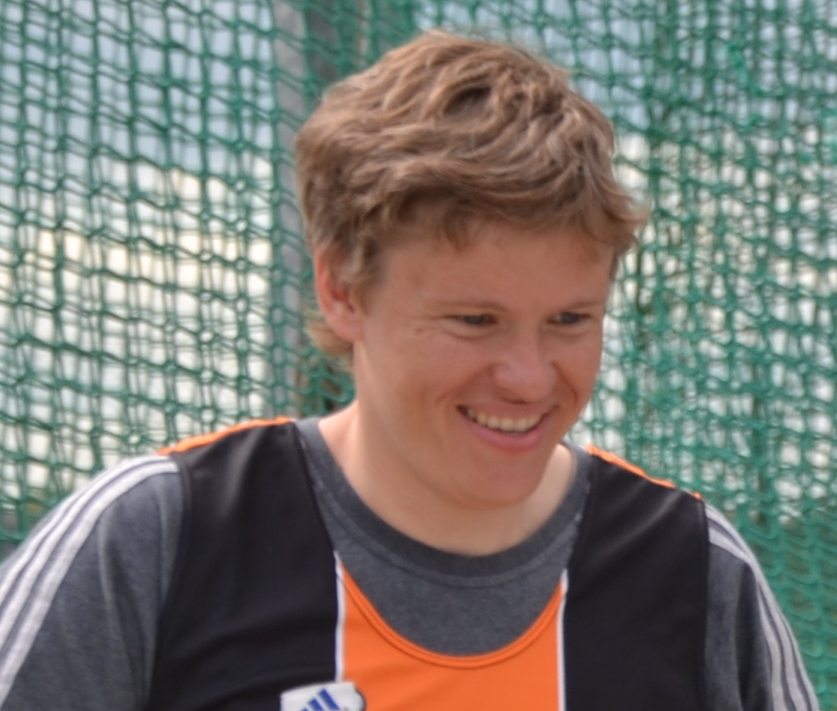
- Manuela Montebrun

Personal information
- Nationality: French
- Born: 13 November 1979 (age 46)
- Height: 1.75 m (5 ft 9 in)
- Weight: 90 kg (198 lb)

Sport
- Country: France
- Sport: Athletics
- Event: Hammer throw

Achievements and titles
- Personal best: outdoor - 74.66 m (2005)
Medal record
Representing France
Olympic Games
Bronze medal – third place	2008 Beijing	Hammer throw
World Championships
Bronze medal – third place	2003 Paris	Hammer throw
Bronze medal – third place	2005 Helsinki	Hammer throw
Universiade
Gold medal – first place	2001 Beijing	Hammer throw
Bronze medal – third place	1999 Palma de Mallorca	Hammer throw
Goodwill Games
Bronze medal – third place	2001 Brisbane	Hammer throw
European Championships
Bronze medal – third place	2002 Munich	Hammer throw
Jeux de la Francophonie
Gold medal – first place	2009 Beirut	Hammer throw
European U23 Championships
Gold medal – first place	2001 Amsterdam	Hammer throw
- Updated on 24 October 2013

Manuela Montebrun (born 13 November 1979) is a retired, female hammer thrower from France. She is an Olympic bronze medallist and two-time World Championship bronze medallist.

== Career ==
Born in Laval, Mayenne, Montebrun won two back-to-back World Championship bronze medals in 2003 and 2005. She had finished fourth in the final of the 2005 World Championships, but was belatedly awarded the bronze medal in 2013 when the 2005 World Championships gold medallist Olga Kuzenkova was stripped of her gold medal for doping.

Montebrun's outdoor, personal best throw is 74.66 metres, achieved on 11 July 2005 in Zagreb, Croatia.

Montebrun retired from athletics in June 2012.

Originally fifth in the 2008 Olympic final, Montebrun was promoted to the bronze medal position in 2016, after the drugs disqualifications of Aksana Miankova and Darya Pchelnik.

== Results in international competitions ==
Note: Only the position and distance in the final are indicated, unless otherwise stated. If the athlete did not qualify for the final, the overall position and distance in the qualification round are indicated.

Year	Competition	Venue	Position	Notes
Representing France
1998	World Junior Championships	Annecy, France	5th	58.28 m
1998	European Championships	Budapest, Hungary	25th (q)	54.13 m
1999	Universiade	Palma de Mallorca, Spain	3rd	68.11 m
1999	European U23 Championships	Gothenburg, Sweden	4th	61.95 m
1999	World Championships	Seville, Spain	12th	62.44 m
2000	European Cup	Gateshead, England	3rd	67.73 m
2000	Olympic Games	Sydney, Australia	24th (q)	57.77 m
2001	European Athletics U23 Championships	Amsterdam, Netherlands	1st	66.73 m
2001	World Championships	Edmonton, Canada	5th	67.78 m
2001	Universiade	Beijing, China	1st	69.78 m
2001	Goodwill Games	Brisbane, Australia	3rd	69.80 m
2002	European Cup	Annecy, France	2nd	68.53 m
2002	European Championships	Munich, Germany	3rd	72.04 m
2003	European Cup	Florence, Italy	1st	74.43 m
2003	World Championships	Paris, France	3rd	70.92 m
2003	World Athletics Final	Szombathely, Hungary	4th	68.88 m
2004	Olympic Games	Athens, Greece	15th (q)	67.90 m
2004	World Athletics Final	Szombathely, Hungary	3rd	70.63 m
2005	European Cup	Florence, Italy	2nd	71.10 m
2005	World Championships	Helsinki, Finland	3rd	71.41 m
2005	World Athletics Final	Szombathely, Hungary	7th	69.70 m
2007	World Championships	Osaka, Japan	8th	70.36 m
2008	Olympic Games	Beijing, China	3rd	72.54 m
2009	World Championships	Berlin, Germany	12th	69.92 m
2009	Jeux de la Francophonie	Beirut, Lebanon	1st	70.26 m
