= Vânia Silva =

Portuguese hammer thrower (born 1980)

Personal information
- Born: 8 June 1980 (age 46) Leiria, Portugal
- Height: 1.73 m (5 ft 8 in)
- Weight: 80 kg (176 lb)

Sport
- Country: Portugal
- Sport: Athletics
- Event: Hammer throw
- Updated on 14 August 2012

Vânia Sofia de Sousa Silva (born 8 June 1980) is a Portuguese female hammer thrower. Her personal best throw is 69.55 metres, achieved in May 2011 in Vila Real de Santo António, Portugal. She competed at the World Championships in 2001, 2003, 2007, 2009 and 2011 as well as the Olympic Games in 2004, 2008 and 2012 without reaching the final.

== Achievements ==
Year	Competition	Venue	Position	Notes
Representing Portugal
1998	World Junior Championships	Annecy, France	20th (q)	51.83 m
1999	European Junior Championships	Riga, Latvia	9th (q)	54.01 m
2000	Ibero-American Championships	Rio de Janeiro, Brazil	3rd	57.35 m
2001	European U23 Championships	Amsterdam, Netherlands	4th	63.64 m
2001	World Championships	Edmonton, Canada	28th (q)	58.91 m
2001	Universiade	Beijing, China	15th (q)	59.41 m
2002	Ibero-American Championships	Guatemala City, Guatemala	1st	65.02 m
2002	European Championships	Munich, Germany	33rd (q)	58.22 m
2003	World Championships	Paris, France	24th (q)	63.82 m
2004	Ibero-American Championships	Huelva, Spain	4th	63.44 m
2004	Olympic Games	Athens, Greece	34th (q)	63.81 m
2005	Universiade	İzmir, Turkey	17th (q)	57.01 m
2006	Ibero-American Championships	Ponce, Puerto Rico	2nd	64.59 m
2006	European Championships	Gothenburg, Sweden	33rd (q)	60.51 m
2007	World Championships	Osaka, Japan	34th (q)	61.81 m
2008	Olympic Games	Beijing, China	46th (q)	59.42 m
2009	World Championships	Berlin, Germany	37th (q)	62.86 m
2010	Ibero-American Championships	San Fernando, Spain	5th	63.05 m
2011	World Championships	Daegu, South Korea	25th (q)	65.40 m
2012	European Championships	Helsinki, Finland	20th (q)	62.81 m
2012	Olympic Games	London, United Kingdom	35th (q)	62.81 m
