= Yelena Konevtseva =

Russian hammer thrower

Yelena Konevtseva known by her full name Yelena Nikolayevna Konevtseva (Russian: Елена Николаевна Коневцева; born 11 March 1981 in Klin, Moscow Oblast) is a hammer thrower from Russia. Her personal best is 76.21 metres, achieved in May 2007 in Sochi.

She finished tenth at the 2000 World Junior Championships and fifth at the 2007 World Championships. In addition she competed at the 2002 European Athletics Championships, the 2003 World Championships, the 2004 Olympic Games and the 2008 Olympic Games without reaching the final.

== International competitions ==
Representing Russia
Year	Competition	Venue	Position	Event	Result	Notes
2003	World Championships	Paris, France	25th	Hammer throw	63.00 m	
2004	Olympic Games	Athens, Greece	16th	Hammer throw	67.83 m	
2007	World Championships	Osaka, Japan	5th	Hammer throw	72.45 m	
2008	Olympic Games	Beijing, China	22nd	Hammer throw	67.83 m	
