= Sanja Gavrilović =

Croatian hammer thrower

Sanja Gavrilović (born 20 September 1982 in Split, Split-Dalmacija) is a female hammer thrower from Croatia. Her personal best throw is 70.07 metres, achieved in July 2008 in Ljubljana.

== Competition record ==
| Year | Competition | Venue | Position | Notes |
Representing Croatia
| 2002 | European Championships | Munich, Germany | 36th (q) | 56.98 m |
| 2003 | European U23 Championships | Bydgoszcz, Poland | 7th | 63.88 m |
| 2003 | World Championships | Paris, France | — | NM |
| 2004 | Olympic Games | Athens, Greece | 45th (q) | 56.79 m |
| 2005 | Mediterranean Games | Almería, Spain | 9th | 62.58 m |
| 2008 | Olympic Games | Beijing, PR China | 45th (q) | 60.55 m |
