= 1998 World Junior Championships in Athletics – Women's hammer throw =

The women's hammer throw event at the 1998 World Junior Championships in Athletics was held in Annecy, France, at Parc des Sports on 28 and 29 July.

== Medalists ==
Gold	Bianca Achilles; Germany
Silver	Sini Pöyry; Finland
Bronze	Maureen Griffin; United States

== Results ==
=== Final ===
29 July

Rank	Name	Nationality	Attempts						Result	Notes
Rank	Name	Nationality	1	2	3	4	5	6	Result	Notes
1st place, gold medalist(s)	Bianca Achilles	Germany	60.07	56.73	61.42	61.79	61.47	x	61.79	
2nd place, silver medalist(s)	Sini Pöyry	Finland	61.76	57.37	60.66	60.64	61.15	x	61.76	
3rd place, bronze medalist(s)	Maureen Griffin	United States	x	60.14	x	57.38	x	54.84	60.14	
4	Yipsi Moreno	Cuba	59.05	x	59.85	x	x	59.81	59.85	
5	Manuela Montebrun	France	53.20	56.17	54.30	58.28	58.15	54.97	58.28	
6	Júlia Tudja	Hungary	56.67	56.11	56.27	56.81	57.73	x	57.73	
7	Céline Vandeville	France	54.24	57.36	x	56.02	55.44	56.19	57.36	
8	Bronwyn Eagles	Australia	54.38	56.77	53.92	53.47	55.99	x	56.77	
9	Yunaika Crawford	Cuba	55.93	50.13	56.01				56.01	
10	Natalya Samusenkova	Russia	53.55	53.08	x				53.55	
11	Janna Wren	United States	49.06	x	52.17				52.17	
	Cecilia Nilsson	Sweden	x	x	x				NM	

=== Qualifications ===
28 Jul

==== Group A ====
Rank	Name	Nationality	Attempts			Result	Notes
Rank	Name	Nationality	1	2	3	Result	Notes
1	Bianca Achilles	Germany	60.13	-	-	60.13	Q
2	Yipsi Moreno	Cuba	x	56.87	58.41	58.41	Q
3	Céline Vandeville	France	54.29	55.33	57.95	57.95	Q
4	Júlia Tudja	Hungary	56.45	57.41	-	57.41	Q
5	Maureen Griffin	United States	x	57.37	-	57.37	Q
6	Natalya Samusenkova	Russia	54.94	54.44	55.51	55.51	q
7	Bronwyn Eagles	Australia	54.77	52.31	x	54.77	q
8	Ivana Brkljačić	Croatia	51.64	x	53.81	53.81	
9	Ainhoa Cabré	Spain	53.44	x	53.80	53.80	
10	Sónia Alves	Portugal	48.27	x	50.37	50.37	
11	Jennifer Joyce	Canada	x	50.07	x	50.07	
12	Evaggelía Dervéni	Greece	46.35	x	49.78	49.78	
13	Jessica Ponce	Mexico	49.67	47.12	47.28	49.67	
14	Merja Korpela	Finland	x	x	49.34	49.34	
15	Anabelle Gómez	Venezuela	46.73	x	48.38	48.38	
16	Albana Panga	Albania	x	43.40	43.38	43.40	

==== Group B ====
Rank	Name	Nationality	Attempts			Result	Notes
Rank	Name	Nationality	1	2	3	Result	Notes
1	Sini Pöyry	Finland	59.35	-	-	59.35	Q
2	Yunaika Crawford	Cuba	57.03	-	-	57.03	Q
3	Manuela Montebrun	France	55.35	54.58	56.38	56.38	q
4	Janna Wren	United States	50.89	53.02	55.39	55.39	q
5	Cecilia Nilsson	Sweden	53.77	x	55.29	55.29	q
6	Rachael Beverley	United Kingdom	54.64	53.97	x	54.64	
7	Nesrin Kaya	Turkey	53.77	53.86	54.29	54.29	
8	Olga Markevich	Belarus	51.24	52.98	53.70	53.70	
9	Madlen Döhring	Germany	49.73	52.59	52.15	52.59	
10	Brooke Krueger	Australia	x	52.15	x	52.15	
11	Vânia Silva	Portugal	x	51.83	x	51.83	
12	Barbara Németh	Hungary	51.33	51.16	x	51.33	
13	Lucie Krouzová	Czech Republic	x	43.30	46.17	46.17	
14	Dubraska Rodríguez	Venezuela	x	44.85	x	44.85	

== Participation ==
According to an unofficial count, 30 athletes from 21 countries participated in the event.

- Albania (1)
- Australia (2)
- Belarus (1)
- Canada (1)
- Croatia (1)
- Cuba (2)
- Czech Republic (1)
- Finland (2)
- France (2)
- Germany (2)
- Greece (1)
- Hungary (2)
- Mexico (1)
- Portugal (2)
- Russia (1)
- Spain (1)
- Sweden (1)
- Turkey (1)
- United Kingdom (1)
- United States (2)
- Venezuela (2)
