= Aldenay Vasallo =

Cuban hammer thrower

Aldenay Vasallo Machado (born February 25, 1977) is a female hammer thrower from Cuba. She set her personal best throw (69.72 metres) on June 20, 2003, at a meet in Havana, Cuba.

== Achievements ==
Year	Tournament	Venue	Result	Event
Representing Cuba
1998	Central American and Caribbean Games	Maracaibo, Venezuela	1st	61.46 m
2002	Ibero-American Championships	Guatemala City, Guatemala	2nd	63.75 m
2003	World Championships	Paris, France	36th (q)	58.96 m
2004	Ibero-American Championships	Huelva, Spain	5th	62.65 m
2004	Olympic Games	Athens, Greece	37th (q)	62.64 m
