= Kamila Skolimowska =

Polish hammer thrower

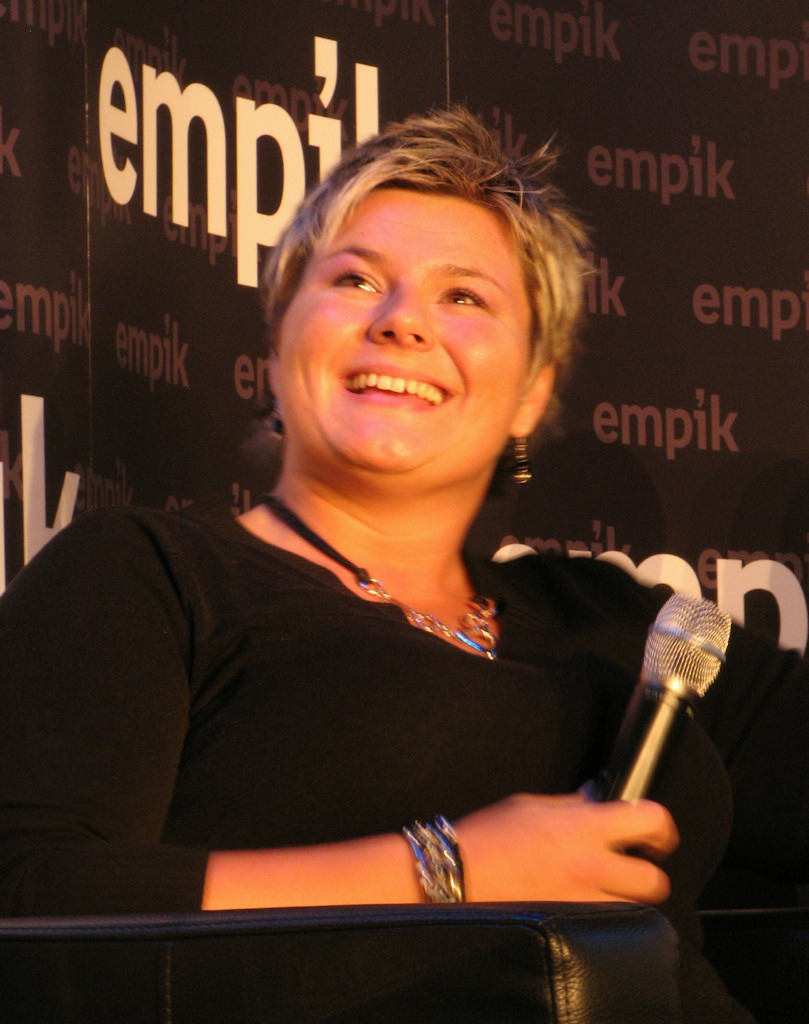
- Skolimowska in 2008

Personal information
- Full name: Kamila Skolimowska
- Nationality: Polish
- Born: 4 November 1982 Warsaw, Poland
- Died: 18 February 2009 (aged 26) Vila Real de Santo António, Portugal

Sport
- Sport: Athletics
- Event: Hammer throw
Medal record
Women's athletics
Representing Poland
Olympic Games
Gold medal – first place	2000 Sydney	Hammer throw
European Championships
Silver medal – second place	2002 Munich	Hammer throw
Bronze medal – third place	2006 Gothenburg	Hammer throw
European Cup Winter Throwing
Gold medal – first place	2006 Tel Aviv	Hammer throw
Universiade
Gold medal – first place	2005 İzmir	Hammer throw
European U23 Championships
Gold medal – first place	2003 Bydgoszcz	Hammer throw
World Youth Championships
Gold medal – first place	1999 Bydgoszcz	Hammer throw
European Junior Championships
Gold medal – first place	1997 Ljubljana	Hammer throw

Kamila Skolimowska (4 November 1982 – 18 February 2009) was a Polish hammer thrower. She is best known for her gold medal in the Sydney 2000 Summer Olympics, which made her the youngest Olympic hammer champion, as well as for her two medals from the European Championships. Her personal best throw, and former Polish record, was 76.83 metres, achieved in May 2007 in Doha. She died on 18 February 2009 in Vila Real de Santo António, Portugal at the Polish national team training camp.

== Early life and career ==
She was born in Warsaw. Her father is super heavyweight weightlifter Robert Skolimowski who competed at the 1980 Summer Olympics and won the bronze medal at the 1986 World Weightlifting Championships. Skolimowska first made herself known at age fifteen, when she won the hammer throw event at the 1997 European Junior Championships; the first time hammer throw was staged at the European Junior Championships. She was actually fourteen years and 264 days at the time, and had become Polish national champion and record holder the year before. Her personal best in 1997 was 63.48 metres. She improved her personal best to 66.62 metres in 1999. She also finished seventh at the 1998 European Championships, won the 1999 World Youth Championships and finished twenty-first at the 1999 World Championships.

== Olympic champion ==
At the 2000 Summer Olympics she won a gold medal in the hammer throw, with a new personal best throw of 71.16 metres. Gold medal favourite Mihaela Melinte was disqualified shortly before the start of the qualifying round for failing a drugs test. At age 17 years and 331 days, Skolimowska became the youngest Olympic hammer champion. As it was the first time that the women's hammer throw was staged at the Olympics, she also set an Olympic record, which stood for four years. She received the Polish Golden Cross of Merit for her achievement.

== Career after the Olympic gold ==
In the 2001 season, she finished fourth at the 2001 World Championships in Edmonton, with a throw of 68.05 metres. One month later she improved her national record to 71.71 metres, which was enough to win the IAAF Grand Prix Final in Melbourne. In 2002, she took her first championships medal since the Olympic victory, at the 2002 European Championships. Throwing 72.46 metres to take the silver medal behind Olga Kuzenkova, she almost improved on her 72.60 result achieved in June in Bydgoszcz. Toward the end of the season she finished fifth at the 2002 World Cup.

Skolimowska did not set new national records in 2003 and 2004. In 2003, she finished eighth both at the 2003 World Championships and the 2003 World Athletics Final. In the final round of the hammer throw at the 2004 Summer Olympics in Athens she recorded a season best of 72.57 metres, placing fifth overall in the event. She again finished fifth at the 2004 World Athletics Final.

== New records ==
In July 2005 Skolimowska improved her national record to 74.27 metres, the result being achieved in Madrid. Exactly one month later she won the gold medal at the Universiade, four days after finishing seventh at the 2005 World Championships. At the 2005 World Athletics Final she finished second. In 2006 Skolimowska improved her national record again; to 75.29 as she won the 2006 World Cup meet in September in Athens. The record crowned a successful year, with a bronze medal at the 2006 European Championships and a second place at the 2006 World Athletics Final earlier in the season. In 2007 Skolimowska improved with more than a metre, throwing 76.83 in May at the Super Grand Prix meet in Doha. She finished fourth at both the 2007 World Championships and the 2007 World Athletics Final.

2008, however, was an unsuccessful year. Her season's best was only 73.50, achieved in June in Warsaw. In the Olympic competition, she did progress from the qualifying round, but failed to register a valid mark in the final, thus finishing unplaced.

== Death ==
Skolimowska died unexpectedly at the age of 26 during a training session in Portugal. The cause of her death (originally reported in many media as likely a heart attack) was confirmed by autopsy to be pulmonary embolism.

The Kamila Skolimowska Memorial was established in the year of her death, initially as a hammer throw competition before evolving into an annual track and field event.

== Competition record ==
Year	Competition	Venue	Position	Notes
Representing Poland
1997	European Junior Championships	Ljubljana, Slovenia	1st	59.72 m
1998	European Championships	Budapest, Hungary	7th	62.68 m
1999	World Youth Championships	Bydgoszcz, Poland	1st	63.94 m
1999	World Championships	Seville, Spain	21st (q)	50.38 m
2000	Olympic Games	Sydney, Australia	1st	71.16 m
2000	World Junior Championships	Santiago, Chile	20th (q)	51.84 m
2001	World Championships	Edmonton, Canada	4th	68.05 m
2001	Goodwill Games	Brisbane, Australia	1st	70.31 m
2002	European Championships	Munich, Germany	2nd	72.46 m
2003	European U23 Championships	Bydgoszcz, Poland	1st	71.38 m
2003	World Championships	Paris, France	8th	68.39 m
2004	Olympic Games	Athens, Greece	5th	72.57 m
2005	World Championships	Helsinki, Finland	7th	68.96 m
2005	Universiade	İzmir, Turkey	1st	72.75 m
2006	European Championships	Gothenburg, Sweden	3rd	72.58 m
2007	World Championships	Osaka, Japan	4th	73.75 m
2008	Olympic Games	Beijing, China	12th	NM
