= Cecilia Nilsson (athlete) =

Swedish hammer thrower

Cecilia Nilsson (born 22 June 1979) is a retired female hammer thrower from Sweden. She set her personal best (69.09 metres) on 24 May 2008 at a meet in Halle, Saxony-Anhalt.

== Achievements ==
Year	Competition	Venue	Position	Notes
Representing Sweden
1998	World Junior Championships	Annecy, France	11th (q)	55.29 m
1999	European U23 Championships	Gothenburg, Sweden	8th	59.28 m
2001	European U23 Championships	Amsterdam, Netherlands	3rd	64.06 m
2001	World Championships	Edmonton, Canada	22nd	61.53 m
2002	European Championships	Munich, Germany	15th	62.85 m
2003	World Championships	Paris, France	33rd	61.14 m
2005	World Championships	Helsinki, Finland	28th	62.27 m
2006	European Championships	Gothenburg, Sweden	16th	65.23 m
2007	World Championships	Osaka, Japan	14th	68.09 m
2009	World Championships	Berlin, Germany	34th	63.77 m
