= Ester Balassini =

Italian hammer thrower (born 1977)

Personal information
- National team: Italy: 28 caps (1998-2008)
- Born: 28 October 1977 (age 48) Bologna

Sport
- Country: Italy
- Sport: Athletics
- Event: Hammer throw
Medal record
Event	1st	2nd	3rd
Summer Universiade	0	0	1
Mediterranean Games	1	1	0
Total	1	1	1

Ester Balassini (born 20 October 1977) is an Italian hammer thrower. Her personal best throw is 73.59 metres, achieved in June 2005 in Brixen.

She is married to the former discus thrower Cristiano Andrei.

== Achievements ==
Year	Competition	Venue	Position	Notes
Representing Italy
1997	European U23 Championships	Turku, Finland	10th	55.12 m
1998	European Championships	Budapest, Hungary	19th (q)	56.42 m
1999	Universiade	Palma de Mallorca, Spain	12th	61.22 m
1999	European U23 Championships	Gothenburg, Sweden	5th	60.82 m
2000	Olympic Games	Sydney, Australia	—	NM
2001	World Championships	Edmonton, Canada	—	NM
2001	Mediterranean Games	Tunis, Tunisia	2nd	64.13 m
2001	Universiade	Beijing, China	12th	61.22 m
2002	European Championships	Munich, Germany	6th	67.27 m
2003	World Championships	Paris, France	17th (q)	64.77 m
2004	Olympic Games	Athens, Greece	26th (q)	65.58 m
2005	Mediterranean Games	Almería, Spain	1st	71.17 m
2005	World Championships	Helsinki, Finland	—	NM
2005	Universiade	İzmir, Turkey	3rd	70.13 m
2005	World Athletics Final	Szombathely, Hungary	5th	70.63 m
2006	European Championships	Gothenburg, Sweden	19th (q)	64.20 m
2006	World Athletics Final	Stuttgart, Germany	6th	66.66 m

== National titles ==
Balassini won five national championships at individual senior level.

- Italian Athletics Championships
  - Hammer throw: 1998, 1999, 2000, 2001, 2005 (5)
