= Markéta Hajdu =

Czech hammer thrower

Markéta Hajdu (born Markéta Procházková; 9 September 1974) is a Czech retired hammer thrower.

In the 1990s, she was among the pioneers of the Czech women hammer throw and she increased the Czech record in the hammer throw several times (first time in 1993 with a throw of 44.18 metres). She set her personal best throw (65.91 metres) on 2 June 2001 at a meet in Prague, earning her a berth for the 2001 World Championships in Edmonton, Canada.

== Achievements ==
Year	Competition	Venue	Position	Notes
Representing Czech Republic
2001	World Championships	Edmonton, Canada	33rd	55.77 m
