= Athletics at the 2000 Summer Olympics – Women's hammer throw =

Women's hammer throw at the Games of the XXVII Olympiad
- Venue: Stadium Australia
- Dates: 27 September 2000 (qualification); 29 September 2000 (final)
- Competitors: 28 from 20 nations
- Winning distance: 71.16 OR

Medalists
| 1st place, gold medalist(s) | | Kamila Skolimowska; Poland |
| 2nd place, silver medalist(s) | | Olga Kuzenkova; Russia |
| 3rd place, bronze medalist(s) | | Kirsten Münchow; Germany |

The Women's Hammer Throw event at the 2000 Summer Olympics as part of the athletics program was held at the Olympic Stadium on Wednesday, 27 September and Friday, 29 September.

The qualifying athletes progressed through to the final where the qualifying distances are scrapped and they start afresh with up to six throws. The qualifying distance was 65.50 metres. For all qualifiers who did not achieve the standard, the remaining spaces in the final were filled by the longest throws until a total of 12 qualifiers.

== Medalists ==
| Gold | Kamila Skolimowska; Poland |
| Silver | Olga Kuzenkova; Russia |
| Bronze | Kirsten Münchow; Germany |

== Schedule ==
- All times are Australian Eastern Standard Time (UTC+10)

Qualification Round
| Group A | Group B |
|---|---|
| 27.09.2000 – 09:00h | 27.09.2000 – 11:00h |
Final Round
29.09.2000 – 19:00h

== Abbreviations ==
| Q | automatic qualification |
| q | qualification by rank |
| DNS | did not start |
| NM | no mark |
| OR | olympic record |
| WR | world record |
| AR | area record |
| NR | national record |
| PB | personal best |
| SB | season best |

== Records ==
Standing records prior to the 2000 Summer Olympics
| World Record | Mihaela Melinte (ROM) | 76.06 m | 29 August 1999 | Rüdlingen, Switzerland |
| Olympic Record | New Event | | | |
| Seasons Best | Olga Kuzenkova (RUS) | 75.68 m | 4 June 2000 | Tula, Russia |
Broken records during the 2000 Summer Olympics
| Olympic Record | Olga Kuzenkova (RUS) | 70.60 m | 27 September 2000 | Sydney, Australia |
| Olympic Record | Kamila Skolimowska (POL) | 71.16 m | 29 September 2000 | Sydney, Australia |

== Qualifying ==
=== Group A ===
| Rank | Athlete | Country | Attempts | | | Distance | Note |
| Rank | Athlete | Country | 1 | 2 | 3 | Distance | Note |
|---|---|---|---|---|---|---|---|
| 1 | Olga Kuzenkova | Russia | 70.60 | — | — | 70.60 m | OR |
| 2 | Kamila Skolimowska | Poland | 66.30 | — | — | 66.30 m | |
| 3 | Yipsi Moreno | Cuba | 65.74 | — | — | 65.74 m | |
| 4 | Dawn Ellerbe | United States | 64.91 | 63.27 | 57.99 | 64.91 m | |
| 5 | Svetlana Sudak | Belarus | X | X | 63.83 | 63.83 m | |
| 6 | Lorraine Shaw | Great Britain | 63.21 | 62.60 | 57.09 | 63.21 m | |
| 7 | Amy Palmer | United States | 61.96 | 62.49 | 62.78 | 62.78 m | |
| 8 | Iryna Sekachova | Ukraine | 61.44 | 60.62 | X | 61.44 m | |
| 9 | Tasha Williams | New Zealand | 50.96 | 54.14 | 61.18 | 61.18 m | |
| 10 | Alla Davydova | Russia | 60.86 | X | X | 60.86 m | |
| 11 | Karyne Perkins | Australia | 55.18 | 59.49 | 55.22 | 59.49 m | |
| 12 | Mia Strömmer | Finland | 57.33 | X | 59.43 | 59.43 m | |
| 13 | Michelle Fournier | Canada | X | 55.72 | 59.15 | 59.15 m | |
| 14 | Caroline Fournier | Mauritius | X | 53.60 | 56.18 | 56.18 m | |
| — | Ester Balassini | Italy | X | X | X | NM | |

=== Group B ===
| Rank | Athlete | Country | Attempts | | | Distance | Note |
| Rank | Athlete | Country | 1 | 2 | 3 | Distance | Note |
|---|---|---|---|---|---|---|---|
| 1 | Kirsten Münchow | Germany | 59.09 | 67.64 | — | 67.64 m | |
| 2 | Ivana Brkljačić | Croatia | 65.01 | 62.59 | X | 65.01 m | |
| 3 | Deborah Sosimenko | Australia | 64.01 | 61.18 | 59.53 | 64.01 m | |
| 4 | Sini Pöyry | Finland | 63.80 | 60.12 | 61.81 | 63.80 m | |
| 5 | Lyudmila Gubkina | Belarus | 62.40 | 63.13 | 63.29 | 63.29 m | |
| 6 | Katalin Divós | Hungary | 61.88 | X | 62.74 | 62.74 m | |
| 7 | Lisa Misipeka | American Samoa | 61.74 | 58.74 | X | 61.74 m | |
| 8 | Tatyana Konstantinova | Russia | 57.24 | 61.14 | 61.48 | 61.48 m | |
| 9 | Jesseca Cross | United States | 56.98 | 60.85 | 60.51 | 60.85 m | |
| 10 | Zhao Wei | China | 59.54 | 57.44 | 55.98 | 59.54 m | |
| 11 | Manuela Montebrun | France | 57.60 | X | 57.77 | 57.77 m | |
| 12 | Aneliya Yordanova | Bulgaria | X | 54.92 | 54.69 | 54.92 m | |
| — | Olga Tsander | Belarus | X | X | X | NM | |

=== Overall Qualifying results ===
| Place | Athlete | Country | Group | Mark | Qual | Extra |
|---|---|---|---|---|---|---|
| 1 | Olga Kuzenkova | Russia | A | 70.60 | Q | OR |
| 2 | Kirsten Münchow | Germany | B | 67.64 | Q | |
| 3 | Kamila Skolimowska | Poland | A | 66.30 | Q | |
| 4 | Yipsi Moreno | Cuba | A | 65.74 | Q | |
| 5 | Ivana Brkljačić | Croatia | B | 65.01 | Q | |
| 6 | Dawn Ellerbe | United States | A | 64.91 | Q | |
| 7 | Deborah Sosimenko | Australia | B | 64.01 | Q | |
| 8 | Svetlana Sudak | Belarus | A | 63.83 | Q | |
| 9 | Sini Pöyry | Finland | B | 63.80 | Q | |
| 10 | Lyudmila Gubkina | Belarus | B | 63.29 | Q | |
| 11 | Lorraine Shaw | Great Britain | A | 63.21 | Q | |
| 12 | Amy Palmer | United States | A | 62.78 | Q | |
| 13 | Katalin Divós | Hungary | B | 62.74 | | |
| 14 | Lisa Misipeka | American Samoa | B | 61.74 | | |
| 15 | Tatyana Konstantinova | Russia | B | 61.48 | | |
| 16 | Iryna Sekachova | Ukraine | A | 61.44 | | |
| 17 | Tasha Williams | New Zealand | A | 61.18 | | |
| 18 | Alla Davydova | Russia | A | 60.68 | | |
| 19 | Jesseca Cross | United States | B | 60.85 | | |
| 20 | Zhao Wei | China | B | 59.54 | | |
| 21 | Karyne Perkins | Australia | A | 59.49 | | |
| 22 | Mia Strömmer | Finland | A | 59.43 | | |
| 23 | Michelle Fournier | Canada | B | 59.15 | | |
| 24 | Manuela Montebrun | France | B | 57.77 | | |
| 25 | Caroline Fournier | Mauritius | A | 56.18 | | |
| 26 | Aneliya Yordanova | Bulgaria | B | 54.92 | | |
| — | Ester Balassini | Italy | A | NM | | |
| — | Olga Tsander | Belarus | B | NM | | |

== Final ==
| Rank | Athlete | Attempts | | | | | | Distance | Extra |
| Rank | Athlete | 1 | 2 | 3 | 4 | 5 | 6 | Distance | Extra |
|---|---|---|---|---|---|---|---|---|---|
| 1st place, gold medalist(s) | Kamila Skolimowska (POL) | X | 66.33 | 71.16 | 66.06 | 69.91 | — | 71.16 m | OR |
| 2nd place, silver medalist(s) | Olga Kuzenkova (RUS) | X | 67.18 | 69.64 | 69.77 | X | X | 69.77 m | |
| 3rd place, bronze medalist(s) | Kirsten Münchow (GER) | 66.42 | X | 67.81 | 66.03 | 69.28 | 67.96 | 69.28 m | NR |
| 4 | Yipsi Moreno (CUB) | 65.79 | 67.16 | 67.04 | 64.88 | 68.33 | 67.43 | 68.33 m | |
| 5 | Deborah Sosimenko (AUS) | 67.95 | 64.24 | 65.49 | 66.39 | X | X | 67.95 m | AR |
| 6 | Lyudmila Gubkina (BLR) | 66.04 | 66.16 | X | 67.08 | 66.77 | 66.95 | 67.08 m | |
| 7 | Dawn Ellerbe (USA) | 62.50 | 64.51 | 66.80 | 64.40 | 66.16 | 64.71 | 66.80 m | |
| 8 | Amy Palmer (USA) | X | 60.21 | 66.15 | 59.42 | X | X | 66.15 m | |
| 9 | Lorraine Shaw (GBR) | 64.27 | 56.96 | 63.65 | | | | 64.27 m | |
| 10 | Svetlana Sudak (BLR) | X | 64.21 | X | | | | 64.21 m | |
| 11 | Ivana Brkljačić (CRO) | 61.25 | 63.20 | X | | | | 63.20 m | |
| 12 | Sini Pöyry (FIN) | 62.49 | X | 62.21 | | | | 62.49 m | |

== See also ==
- 2000 Hammer Throw Year Ranking
