= Brooke Krueger-Billett =

Australian hammer thrower

Brooke Krueger-Billett (born 9 July 1980 in Tailem Bend) is a female hammer thrower from Australia.

She finished fourth at the 2002 Commonwealth Games, won the gold medal at the 2006 Commonwealth Games and finished seventh at the 2006 IAAF World Cup. In addition she competed at the 2003 World Championships and the 2004 Olympic Games, without reaching the final.

Her personal best is 70.72 metres, achieved in February 2006 in Sydney.

Her uncle Brian Booth is a former cricket and field hockey player. Booth captained Australia's cricketers in two Test matches and was a member of the 1956 Summer Olympics field hockey team for Australia.

== Achievements ==
Year	Competition	Venue	Position	Notes
Representing Australia
1998	World Junior Championships	Annecy, France	19th (q)	52.15 m
2002	Commonwealth Games	Manchester, United Kingdom	4th	63.13 m
2003	World Championships	Paris, France	16th	64.84 m
2004	Olympic Games	Athens, Greece	33rd	63.88 m
2006	Commonwealth Games	Melbourne, Australia	1st	67.90 m
2006	World Cup	Athens, Greece	7th	65.92 m
