= Agnieszka Pogroszewska =

Polish hammer thrower

Agnieszka Pogroszewska (born 20 February 1977) is a retired female hammer thrower from Poland. She set her personal best (67.98 metres) on 8 June 2001 at a meet in Poznań.

She represented Poland at the 2001 World Championships in Athletics and competed at the European Athletics Championships in 1998 and 2002. Pogroszewska has also taken part in the Summer Universiade, finishing eleventh in 2001 and improving to win the bronze medal at the 2003 Summer Universiade.

== Competition record ==
Year	Competition	Venue	Position	Notes
Representing Poland
1997	European U23 Championships	Turku, Finland	12th	54.12 m
1998	European Championships	Budapest, Hungary	13th (q)	58.88 m
1999	European U23 Championships	Gothenburg, Sweden	6th	60.58 m
2001	World Championships	Edmonton, Canada	18th (q)	63.59 m
2001	Universiade	Beijing, China	5th	64.70 m
2002	European Championships	Munich, Germany	24th (q)	60.87 m
2003	Universiade	Daegu, South Korea	3rd	64.27 m
