= Evdokia Tsamoglou =

Greek hammer thrower

Evdokia Tsamoglou (Greek: Ευδοκία Τσάμογλου; born December 15, 1978, in Thessaloniki) is a female hammer thrower from Greece. Her personal best throw is 68.12 metres, achieved in August 2003 in Nikiti, Sithonia. This places her third on the Greek all-time list, behind Alexandra Papayeoryiou and Stiliani Papadopoulou.

== Honours ==
Year	Competition	Venue	Position	Notes
Representing Greece
2001	World Championships	Edmonton, Canada	21st (q)	61.97 m
2001	Universiade	Beijing, China	11th	62.03 m
2002	European Championships	Munich, Germany	12th	64.19 m
2003	World Championships	Paris, France	30th (q)	61.44 m
2004	Olympic Games	Athens, Greece	35th (q)	62.76 m
