= Alla Davydova =

Russian hammer thrower

Alla Davydova, née Fyodorova (Russian: Алла Давыдова; born 21 May 1966 in Bishkek) is a retired female hammer thrower from Russia. Her personal best throw was 69.17 metres (226.9 ft), achieved in May 2003 in Valencia. At the time, this throw set a world record for the women's 35–40 age group.

== International competitions ==
Representing Russia
| Year | Competition | Venue | Position | Event | Result | Notes |
|---|---|---|---|---|---|---|
| 1998 | European Championships | Budapest, Hungary | 8th | Hammer throw | 62.36 m | |
| 2000 | Olympic Games | Sydney, Australia | 18th | Hammer throw | 60.68 m | |
| 2002 | European Championships | Munich, Germany | 9th | Hammer throw | 65.92 m | |
| 2003 | World Championships | Paris, France | 31st (q) | Hammer throw | 61.43 m | |
