= Katalin Divós =

Hungarian hammer thrower

Katalin Divós (born 11 May 1974 in Szombathely) is a female hammer thrower from Hungary. Her personal best is 70.79 metres, achieved in May 2001 in .

== Achievements ==
Year	Competition	Venue	Position	Event	Notes
Representing Hungary
1992	World Junior Championships	Seoul, South Korea	17th (q)	Discus	46.38 m
1998	European Championships	Budapest, Hungary	5th	Hammer	63.74 m
1999	World Championships	Seville, Spain	4th	Hammer	65.86 m
2000	Olympic Games	Sydney, Australia	13th	Hammer	62.74 m
2003	World Championships	Paris, France	26th	Hammer	62.58 m
2004	Olympic Games	Athens, Greece	17th	Hammer	67.64 m
2004	World Athletics Final	Szombathely, Hungary	4th	Hammer	69.94 m
2006	European Championships	Gothenburg, Sweden	30th	Hammer	60.91 m
2007	World Championships	Osaka, Japan	36th	Hammer	59.45 m

== See also ==
- List of sportspeople sanctioned for doping offences
