= Athletics at the 2004 Summer Olympics – Women's hammer throw =

Women's hammer throw at the Games of the XXVIII Olympiad
- Olympic Athletics
- Venue: Olympic Stadium
- Dates: 23–25 August
- Competitors: 48 from 27 nations
- Winning distance: 75.02 OR

Medalists
1st place, gold medalist(s)		Olga Kuzenkova	Russia
2nd place, silver medalist(s)		Yipsi Moreno	Cuba
3rd place, bronze medalist(s)		Yunaika Crawford	Cuba

The women's hammer throw competition at the 2004 Summer Olympics in Athens was held at the Olympic Stadium on 23–25 August.

== Competition format ==
Each athlete receives three throws in the qualifying round. All who achieve the qualifying distance progress to the final. If less than twelve athletes achieve this mark, then the twelve furthest throwing athletes reach the final. Each finalist is allowed three throws in last round, with the top eight athletes after that point being given three further attempts.

== Schedule ==
All times are Greece Standard Time (UTC+2)

Date	Time	Round
Monday, 23 August 2004	09:00	Qualification
Wednesday, 25 August 2004	22:10	Final

== Records ==
Prior to the competition, the existing World and Olympic records were as follows:

World record	Mihaela Melinte (ROM)	76.06 m	Rüdlingen, Switzerland	29 August 1999
Olympic record	Kamila Skolimowska (POL)	71.16 m	Sydney, Australia	29 September 2000

The following records were established during the competition:

Date	Event	Name	Nationality	Result	Record
21 August	Qualification A	Gu Yuan	China	71.65 m	OR
21 August	Qualification B	Olga Kuzenkova	Russia	73.71 m	OR
23 August	Final	Olga Kuzenkova	Russia	75.02 m	OR

== Results ==
=== Qualifying round ===
Rule: Qualifying standard 68.50 (Q) or at least best 12 qualified (q).

Rank	Group	Name	Nationality	#1	#2	#3	Result	Notes
1	B	Olga Kuzenkova	Russia	73.71	—	—	73.71	Q, OR
2	B	Yunaika Crawford	Cuba	71.74	—	—	71.74	Q
3	A	Gu Yuan	China	71.65	—	—	71.65	Q, AS
4	A	Iryna Sekachova	Ukraine	66.57	71.63	—	71.63	Q
5	B	Zhang Wenxiu	China	71.56	—	—	71.56	Q
6	A	Andrea Bunjes	Germany	70.73	—	—	70.73	Q, PB
7	A	Yipsi Moreno	Cuba	70.56	—	—	70.56	Q
8	B	Betty Heidler	Germany	66.20	69.81	—	69.81	Q
9	B	Volha Tsander	Belarus	66.20	x	69.61	69.61	Q
10	A	Kamila Skolimowska	Poland	67.29	68.66	—	68.66	Q
11	B	Alexandra Papageorgiou	Greece	64.59	68.58	—	68.58	Q
12	B	Candice Scott	Trinidad and Tobago	x	66.97	68.27	68.27	q
13	A	Ivana Brkljačić	Croatia	63.21	68.21	68.15	68.21	
14	B	Liu Yinghui	China	66.67	66.30	68.12	68.12	
15	B	Manuela Montebrun	France	64.31	67.74	67.90	67.90	
16	A	Yelena Konevtseva	Russia	66.88	67.83	x	67.83	
17	A	Katalin Divós	Hungary	67.39	67.64	x	67.64	
18	A	Julianna Tudja	Hungary	62.80	65.94	66.85	66.85	
19	B	Tatyana Lysenko	Russia	x	66.82	65.57	66.82	
20	A	Erin Gilreath	United States	66.71	65.46	66.52	66.71	
21	B	Susanne Keil	Germany	66.35	x	x	66.35	
22	A	Berta Castells	Spain	64.30	x	66.05	66.05	
23	B	Sini Pöyry	Finland	66.05	x	64.35	66.05	
24	B	Éva Orbán	Hungary	65.76	63.68	63.31	65.76	
25	A	Maryia Smaliachkova	Belarus	65.68	65.31	x	65.68	
26	A	Ester Balassini	Italy	x	54.97	65.58	65.58	
27	A	Yuka Murofushi	Japan	65.33	x	63.42	65.33	
28	A	Clarissa Claretti	Italy	62.43	x	65.06	65.06	
29	B	Anna Mahon	United States	64.11	64.99	61.65	64.99	
30	B	Lorraine Shaw	Great Britain	63.06	63.13	64.79	64.79	
31	B	Sviatlana Sudak	Belarus	x	x	64.42	64.42	
32	A	Bronwyn Eagles	Australia	x	64.09	x	64.09	
33	A	Brooke Krueger	Australia	63.00	x	63.88	63.88	
34	A	Vânia Silva	Portugal	63.81	61.77	61.44	63.81	
35	A	Evdokia Tsamoglou	Greece	57.56	62.76	x	62.76	
36	B	Violeta Guzmán	Mexico	62.76	58.18	61.45	62.76	
37	B	Aldenay Vasallo	Cuba	62.64	60.71	61.08	62.64	
38	B	Marwa Hussein	Egypt	62.27	x	57.24	62.27	
39	B	Jackie Jeschelnig	United States	58.00	x	62.23	62.23	
40	B	Stiliani Papadopoulou	Greece	61.48	61.61	x	61.61	
41	A	Shirley Webb	Great Britain	61.60	x	x	61.60	
42	A	Lucie Vrbenská	Czech Republic	x	60.14	60.29	60.29	
43	A	Jennifer Dahlgren	Argentina	x	x	59.52	59.52	
44	B	Deborah Sosimenko	Australia	x	57.79	57.62	57.79	
45	A	Sanja Gavrilović	Croatia	56.79	x	x	56.79	
46	B	Marina Lapina	Azerbaijan	55.34	50.60	x	55.34	
	A	Eleni Teloni	Cyprus	x	—	—	NM	
	B	Lisa Misipeka	American Samoa	x	x	—	NM	

=== Final ===
Rank	Name	Nationality	1	2	3	4	5	6	Result	Notes
1st place, gold medalist(s)	Olga Kuzenkova	Russia	73.18	74.27	75.02	x	72.60	74.92	75.02	OR
2nd place, silver medalist(s)	Yipsi Moreno	Cuba	x	72.68	x	x	73.36	x	73.36	
3rd place, bronze medalist(s)	Yunaika Crawford	Cuba	70.98	71.43	73.16	x	x	70.06	73.16	PB
4	Betty Heidler	Germany	x	67.71	72.73	72.47	70.21	68.49	72.73	NR
5	Kamila Skolimowska	Poland	69.91	68.50	72.57	x	x	67.06	72.57	SB
6	Volha Tsander	Belarus	66.17	70.15	72.27	65.01	x	68.63	72.27	
7	Zhang Wenxiu	China	x	72.03	x	68.03	x	x	72.03	
8	Iryna Sekachova	Ukraine	69.40	70.11	67.34	66.40	70.40	x	70.40	
9	Candice Scott	Trinidad and Tobago	63.13	69.94	68.51				69.94	NR
10	Gu Yuan	China	67.59	68.62	69.76				69.76	
11	Andrea Bunjes	Germany	68.40	61.78	68.22				68.40	
12	Alexandra Papageorgiou	Greece	x	63.26	66.83				66.83	
