= Eleni Teloni =

Cypriot hammer thrower (born 1964)

Eleni Teloni (Greek: Ελένη Τελώνη; born December 16, 1964, in Limassol) is a retired female hammer thrower from Cyprus. She set her personal best throw (65.04 metres) on July 24, 2003, at a meet in Athens, Greece.

== Achievements ==
Year	Competition	Venue	Position	Event	Notes
Representing Cyprus
1991	Games of the Small States of Europe	Andorra la Vella, Andorra	3rd	Javelin throw	48.26 m
1991	Mediterranean Games	Athens, Greece	6th	Javelin throw	49.20 m
1993	Games of the Small States of Europe	Valletta, Malta	2nd	Javelin throw	43.62 m
2001	Mediterranean Games	Radès, Tunisia	10th	Hammer throw	53.10 m
2002	Commonwealth Games	Manchester, United Kingdom	12th	Shot put	13.88 m
2002	Commonwealth Games	Manchester, United Kingdom	17th (q)	Hammer throw	54.82 m
2002	European Championships	Munich, Germany	39th (q)	Hammer throw	55.81 m
2003	World Championships	Paris, France	40th (q)	Hammer throw	55.20 m
2004	Olympic Games	Athens, Greece	—	Hammer throw	NM

== See also ==
- Cypriot records in athletics
