= Athletics at the 2002 Commonwealth Games – Women's shot put =

Women's shot put at the Commonwealth Games

The women's shot put event at the 2002 Commonwealth Games was held on 27–28 July.

== Medalists ==
Gold	Silver	Bronze
Vivian Chukwuemeka; Nigeria	Valerie Vili; New Zealand	Veronica Abrahamse; South Africa

== Results ==
=== Qualification ===
Qualification: 16.50 m (Q) or at least 12 best (q) qualified for the final.

Rank	Group	Athlete	Nationality	#1	#2	#3	Result	Notes
1	A	Valerie Adams	New Zealand	17.63			17.63	Q, NR
2	B	Vivian Chukwuemeka	Nigeria	17.13			17.13	Q
3	A	Cleopatra Borel	Trinidad and Tobago	16.14	16.04	16.90	16.90	Q, NR
4	B	Veronica Abrahamse	South Africa	15.44	15.14	16.48	16.48	q
5	A	Myrtle Augee	England	15.93	15.74	16.32	16.32	q
6	B	Joanne Duncan	England	15.53	16.00	15.66	16.00	q
7	A	Julie Dunkley	England	15.59	15.72	15.80	15.80	q
8	B	Michelle Haage	Australia	15.42	15.27	x	15.42	q
9	B	Ana Po'Uhila	Tonga	15.04	14.91	15.25	15.25	q, SB
10	B	Candice Scott	Trinidad and Tobago	14.88	15.05	15.18	15.18	q
11	A	Tina Akowe	Nigeria	15.03	14.43	14.74	15.03	q
12	B	Eleni Teloni	Cyprus	14.58	14.61	14.81	14.81	q
13	B	Mellisa Gibbons	Jamaica	14.76	14.65	14.15	14.76	
14	A	Olympia Menelaou	Cyprus	x	14.34	14.38	14.38	
15	A	Eva Massey	Northern Ireland	x	13.81	14.27	14.27	
16	A	Zeenat Parveen	Pakistan	11.70	11.70	11.92	11.92	

=== Final ===
Rank	Athlete	Nationality	#1	#2	#3	#4	#5	#6	Result	Notes
1st place, gold medalist(s)	Vivian Chukwuemeka	Nigeria	17.09	17.53	17.09	x	17.48	x	17.53	
2nd place, silver medalist(s)	Valerie Adams	New Zealand	16.87	x	17.45	17.23	17.16	17.13	17.45	
3rd place, bronze medalist(s)	Veronica Abrahamse	South Africa	15.32	16.77	16.58	16.37	16.19	16.19	16.77	
4	Cleopatra Borel	Trinidad and Tobago	16.20	x	15.34	x	16.27	x	16.27	
5	Myrtle Augee	England	15.49	16.05	x	x	15.18	15.64	16.05	
6	Joanne Duncan	England	14.44	15.70	15.34	15.84	15.76	15.99	15.99	
7	Julie Dunkley	England	15.26	x	15.62	15.81	x	x	15.81	
8	Candice Scott	Trinidad and Tobago	15.33	15.14	x	14.90	x	15.10	15.33	
9	Tina Akowe	Nigeria	15.23	14.52	x				15.23	
10	Ana Po'Uhila	Tonga	14.99	15.09	14.61				15.09	
11	Michelle Haage	Australia	x	14.83	x				14.83	
12	Eleni Teloni	Cyprus	13.88	13.60	13.67				13.88	
