= Lucie Vrbenská =

Czech hammer thrower (born 1977)

Lucie Vrbenská (born 12 May 1977 in Prague) is a Czech hammer thrower. Her personal best throw is 67.86 metres, achieved in July 2003 in Olomouc.

== Competition record ==
Year	Competition	Venue	Position	Notes
Representing the Czech Republic
1999	European U23 Championships	Gothenburg, Sweden	16th (q)	54.43 m
2001	World Championships	Edmonton, Canada	25th (q)	60.01 m
2002	European Championships	Munich, Germany	13th (q)	63.17 m
2003	World Championships	Paris, France	38th (q)	57.73 m
2004	Olympic Games	Athens, Greece	42nd (q)	60.29 m
2005	Universiade	İzmir, Turkey	13th (q)	59.84 m
2006	European Championships	Gothenburg, Sweden	36th (q)	69.94 m
