= 1999 European Athletics U23 Championships – Women's hammer throw =

European Under23 Championships of Women Hammer throw in 1999

The women's hammer throw event at the 1999 European Athletics U23 Championships was held in Gothenburg, Sweden, at Ullevi on 30 July and 1 August 1999.

== Medalists ==
Gold	Florence Ezeh; France
Silver	Kirsten Münchow; Germany
Bronze	Manuela Priemer; Germany

== Results ==
=== Final ===
1 August

Rank	Name	Nationality	Attempts						Result	Notes
Rank	Name	Nationality	1	2	3	4	5	6	Result	Notes
1st place, gold medalist(s)	Florence Ezeh	France	64.56	63.78	x	x	63.44	63.29	64.56	
2nd place, silver medalist(s)	Kirsten Münchow	Germany	63.68	59.73	61.18	61.23	61.13	x	63.68	
3rd place, bronze medalist(s)	Manuela Priemer	Germany	58.40	59.26	61.11	61.85	62.36	61.58	62.36	
4	Manuela Montebrun	France	59.63	x	x	61.95	57.60	x	61.95	
5	Ester Balassini	Italy	60.82	x	x	x	60.31	58.90	60.82	
6	Agnieszka Pogroszewska	Poland	55.97	58.81	59.58	60.58	x	x	60.58	
7	Elizabeth Pidgeon	United Kingdom	60.37	57.35	54.70	57.40	59.81	58.69	60.37	
8	Cecilia Nilsson	Sweden	55.61	58.74	x	57.25	57.91	59.28	59.28	
9	Susanne Keil	Germany	56.52	x	x				56.52	
10	Anne-Laure Gremillet	France	53.92	54.32	x				54.32	
11	Julianna Tudja	Hungary	53.08	52.11	51.50				53.08	
12	Sónia Alves	Portugal	49.69	x	52.51				52.51	

=== Qualifications ===
30 July
Qualifying 60.00 or 12 best to the Final

==== Group A ====
Rank	Name	Nationality	Result	Notes
1	Manuela Montebrun	France	61.85	Q
2	Ester Balassini	Italy	60.85	Q
3	Kirsten Münchow	Germany	59.51	q
4	Elizabeth Pidgeon	United Kingdom	58.52	q
5	Cecilia Nilsson	Sweden	56.18	q
6	Julianna Tudja	Hungary	54.71	q
7	Nesrin Kaya	Turkey	54.68	
8	Olga Markevich	Belarus	54.67	
9	Evlókia Tsámoglou	Greece	53.27	
10	Sónia Martins	Portugal	52.69	
	Ainhoa Cabre	Spain	NM	

==== Group B ====
Rank	Name	Nationality	Result	Notes
1	Florence Ezeh	France	63.77	Q
2	Manuela Priemer	Germany	59.82	q
3	Susanne Keil	Germany	59.46	q
4	Agnieszka Pogroszewska	Poland	59.22	q
5	Anne-Laure Gremillet	France	55.59	q
6	Sónia Alves	Portugal	54.95	q
7	Rachael Beverley	United Kingdom	54.46	
8	Lucie Vrbenská	Czech Republic	54.43	
9	Natalya Samusenkova	Russia	54.41	
10	Barbara Sugár	Hungary	52.53	

== Participation ==
According to an unofficial count, 21 athletes from 14 countries participated in the event.

- Belarus (1)
- Czech Republic (1)
- France (3)
- Germany (3)
- Greece (1)
- Hungary (2)
- Italy (1)
- Poland (1)
- Portugal (2)
- Russia (1)
- Spain (1)
- Sweden (1)
- Turkey (1)
- United Kingdom (2)
