= Anna Mahon =

American hammer thrower

Personal information
- Born: 19 December 1974 (age 51) Stamford, Connecticut, United States

Sport
- Sport: Track and field

Anna Mahon, née Norgren (born 19 December 1974) is a retired female hammer thrower from the United States. Her personal best is 72.01 metres, achieved in July 2002 in Walnut, California. She holds the position of Assistant Superintendent of Brookfield Schools. Mahon formerly held the position of principal at Amity Regional High School. She previously served as an English teacher, English department chairperson, and associate principal at the same school. Her husband, Sean Mahon, who still works at Amity High School, is a P. E. teacher and indoor girls' track coach.

== International competitions ==
Year	Competition	Venue	Position	Notes
Representing the United States
2001	World Championships	Edmonton, Canada	17th	63.74 m
2002	World Cup	Madrid, Spain	4th	
2003	Pan American Games	Santo Domingo, Dominican Republic	4th	
2003	World Championships	Paris, France	7th	68.45 m
2003	World Athletics Final	Szombathely, Hungary	6th	
2004	Olympic Games	Athens, Greece	29th	64.99 m
2004	World Athletics Final	Szombathely, Hungary	9th	
