= Zhao Wei (hammer thrower) =

Chinese hammer thrower

Zhao Wei (趙 巍, born January 27, 1979) is a retired female hammer thrower from PR China. She set her personal best (70.67 metres) on April 5, 2003, at a meet in Nanning.

== Achievements ==
Year	Competition	Venue	Position	Notes
Representing China
2000	Olympic Games	Sydney, Australia	20th (q)	59.54 m
2001	East Asian Games	Osaka, Japan	1st	63.98 m
2001	Universiade	Beijing, PR China	8th	63.46 m
2003	World Championships	Paris, France	23rd (q)	63.85 m
2003	Afro-Asian Games	Hyderabad, India	2nd	65.22 m

== See also ==
- China at the World Championships in Athletics
