= Melissa Myerscough =

American hammer thrower

Personal information
- Born: September 5, 1979 (age 47) Orange, California, United States

Sport
- Sport: Track and field

Melissa Myerscough (née Price; born September 5, 1979) is an American former hammer thrower.

Price competed for the Nebraska Cornhuskers track and field team in the NCAA.

She finished twelfth at the 2001 World Championships.

Her personal best throw was 67.59 metres, achieved in May 2003 in Lincoln, Nebraska.

== Achievements ==
Year	Competition	Venue	Position	Notes
Representing the United States
2000	NACAC U-25 Championships	Monterrey, Mexico	1st	61.83m
2001	World Championships	Edmonton, Canada	12th	61.57 m
2001	Universiade	Beijing, China	13th	61.06 m
2003	World Championships	Paris, France	—	DSQ

== See also ==
- List of sportspeople sanctioned for doping offences
