= 2003 World Championships in Athletics – Women's hammer throw =

These are the official results of the Women's Hammer Throw event at the 2003 World Championships in Paris, France. There were a total number of 44 participating athletes, with the final held on Thursday 28 August 2003.

== Medalists ==
Gold	Yipsi Moreno; Cuba (CUB)
Silver	Olga Kuzenkova; Russia (RUS)
Bronze	Manuela Montebrun; France (FRA)

== Schedule ==
- All times are Central European Time (UTC+1)

Qualification Round
Group A	Group B
26.08.2003 – 10:05h	26.08.2003 – 12:00h
Final Round
28.08.2003 – 20:45h

== Abbreviations ==
- All results shown are in metres

Q	automatic qualification
q	qualification by rank
DNS	did not start
NM	no mark
WR	world record
AR	area record
NR	national record
PB	personal best
SB	season best

== Records ==
Standing records prior to the 2003 World Athletics Championships
World Record	Mihaela Melinte (ROM)	76.07 m	August 29, 1999	Rüdlingen, Switzerland
Event Record	Mihaela Melinte (ROM)	75.20 m	August 24, 1999	Seville, Spain
Season Best	Yipsi Moreno (CUB)	75.14 m	July 17, 2003	Savona, Italy

== Startlist ==
Order	№	Athlete	Season Best	Personal Best
GROUP A
1	202	Volha Tsander (BLR)	70.02	76.66
2	424	Andrea Bunjes (GER)	69.33	70.73
3	489	Evdokia Tsamoglou (GER)	68.12	68.12
4	46	Brooke Krueger (AUS)	67.40	70.72
5	566	Clarissa Claretti (ITA)	67.43	71.98
6	904	Alla Davydova (RUS)	69.17	69.17
7	1127	Dawn Ellerbe (USA)	68.33	70.62
8	927	Olga Kuzenkova (RUS)	74.98	75.68
9	1034	Cecilia Nilsson (SWE)	63.49	69.03
10	1154	Melissa Myerscough (USA)	67.59	67.59
11	855	Vânia Silva (POR)	68.14	68.82
12	370	Manuela Montebrun (FRA)	74.50	74.66
13	444	Susanne Keil (GER)	71.93	72.74
14	615	Masumi Aya (JPN)	64.04	67.26
15	168	Gu Yuan (CHN)	72.03	72.36
16	233	Yunaika Crawford (CUB)	70.69	73.16
17	843	Kamila Skolimowska (POL)	71.38	76.83
18	244	Aldenay Vasallo (CUB)	69.72	69.72
19	225	Sanja Gavrilovic (CRO)	67.72	68.48
20	185	Zhao Wei (CHN)	70.67	70.67
21	289	Berta Castells (ESP)	65.70	68.87
22	1071	Candice Scott (TRI)	69.79	71.45
GROUP B
1	276	Marwa Hussein (EGY)	65.26	68.48
2	521	Katalin Divós (HUN)	67.40	70.79
3	224	Ivana Brkljačić (CRO)	68.03	75.08
4	921	Yelena Konevtseva (RUS)	69.59	76.21
5	341	Sini Pöyry (FIN)	67.64	69.16
6	409	Lorraine Shaw (GBR)	68.93	68.93
7	351	Florence Ezeh (FRA)	67.51	68.03
8	879	Mihaela Melinte (ROU)	71.99	76.07
9	183	Zhang Wenxiu (CHN)	70.60	74.86
10	1100	Iryna Sekachova (UKR)	72.96	74.31
11	109	Aksana Miankova (BLR)	67.58	76.86
12	439	Betty Heidler (GER)	70.42	76.55
13	1144	Anna Mahon (USA)	71.33	72.01
14	31	Lisa Misipeka (ASA)	69.24	69.24
15	242	Yipsi Moreno (CUB)	75.14	76.36
16	44	Bronwyn Eagles (AUS)	71.12	71.12
17	249	Eleni Teloni (CYP)	65.04	65.04
18	564	Ester Balassini (ITA)	70.43	73.59
19	113	Sviatlana Sudak (BLR)	68.55	69.80
20	484	Alexandra Papayeoryiou (GRE)	69.98	70.33
21	208	Siniva Marsters (COK)	48.47	48.47
22	259	Lucie Vrbenská (CZE)	67.86	67.86

== Qualification ==
=== Group A ===
Rank	Overall	Athlete	Attempts			Distance
Rank	Overall	Athlete	1	2	3	Distance
1	1	Manuela Montebrun (FRA)	71.36	—	—	71.36 m
2	3	Olga Kuzenkova (RUS)	X	67.89	69.53	69.53 m
3	5	Candice Scott (TRI)	67.27	65.86	63.10	67.27 m
4	8	Kamila Skolimowska (POL)	66.38	66.01	X	66.38 m
5	9	Susanne Keil (GER)	61.56	66.30	61.10	66.30 m
6	10	Melissa Price (USA)	66.13	X	X	66.13 m
7	11	Gu Yuan (CHN)	61.14	64.03	66.02	66.02 m
8	16	Brooke Krueger (AUS)	63.97	64.84	X	64.84 m
9	19	Yunaika Crawford (CUB)	59.59	X	64.59	64.59 m
10	23	Zhao Wei (CHN)	60.50	63.85	61.91	63.85 m
11	24	Vânia Silva (POR)	62.75	X	63.82	63.82 m
12	27	Clarissa Claretti (ITA)	X	58.99	62.19	62.19 m
13	29	Dawn Ellerbe (USA)	61.66	56.00	60.19	61.66 m
14	30	Evdokia Tsamoglou (GRE)	X	X	61.44	61.44 m
15	31	Alla Davydova (RUS)	60.93	60.84	61.43	61.43 m
16	33	Cecilia Nilsson (SWE)	X	60.09	61.14	61.14 m
17	34	Masumi Aya (JPN)	60.51	X	60.78	60.78 m
18	36	Aldenay Vasallo (CUB)	58.96	58.71	58.43	58.96 m
19	37	Berta Castells (ESP)	57.64	58.13	X	58.13 m
—	—	Sanja Gavrilovic (CRO)	X	X	X	NM
—	—	Olga Tsander (BLR)	X	X	X	NM
—	—	Andrea Bunjes (GER)	X	X	X	NM
—	—	Melissa Myerscough (USA)	X	X	X	DSQ

=== Group B ===
Rank	Overall	Athlete	Attempts			Distance
Rank	Overall	Athlete	1	2	3	Distance
1	2	Yipsi Moreno (CUB)	66.78	67.20	70.91	70.91 m
2	4	Betty Heidler (GER)	67.46	X	X	67.46 m
3	6	Mihaela Melinte (ROM)	67.23	65.39	67.27	67.27 m
4	7	Anna Mahon (USA)	66.83	66.16	67.25	67.25 m
5	10	Lorraine Shaw (GBR)	66.10	63.53	64.60	66.10 m
6	12	Svetlana Sudak (BLR)	65.29	61.92	X	65.29 m
7	13	Zhang Wenxiu (CHN)	65.09	X	X	65.09 m
8	14	Sini Pöyry (FIN)	60.49	65.00	65.01	65.01 m
9	15	Bronwyn Eagles (AUS)	64.82	64.97	61.25	64.97 m
10	17	Ester Balassini (ITA)	64.04	64.77	60.57	64.77 m
11	18	Alexandra Papayeoryiou (GRE)	64.72	59.94	X	64.72 m
12	20	Marwa Hussein (EGY)	64.53	63.92	64.21	64.53 m
13	21	Lisa Misipeka (ASA)	63.10	61.49	64.42	64.42 m
14	22	Aksana Miankova (BLR)	X	64.11	61.60	64.11 m
15	25	Yelena Konevtseva (RUS)	63.00	59.40	62.88	63.00 m
16	26	Katalin Divós (HUN)	X	59.60	62.58	62.58 m
17	28	Florence Ezeh (FRA)	62.12	57.41	61.73	62.12 m
18	32	Iryna Sekachova (UKR)	X	61.23	56.91	61.23 m
19	35	Ivana Brkljačić (CRO)	56.16	60.06	X	60.06 m
20	38	Lucie Vrbenská (CZE)	X	56.69	57.73	57.73 m
21	39	Eleni Teloni (CYP)	55.20	X	52.83	55.20 m
22	40	Siniva Marsters (COK)	X	41.54	39.60	41.54 m

== Final ==
Rank	Athlete	Attempts						Distance	Note
Rank	Athlete	1	2	3	4	5	6	Distance	Note
1st place, gold medalist(s)	Yipsi Moreno (CUB)	71.02	73.33	72.52	69.84	64.98	X	73.33 m	
2nd place, silver medalist(s)	Olga Kuzenkova (RUS)	68.71	71.14	X	71.71	70.73	65.86	71.71 m	
3rd place, bronze medalist(s)	Manuela Montebrun (FRA)	69.38	68.61	68.37	70.92	69.64	X	70.92 m	
4	Gu Yuan (CHN)	68.68	69.66	70.77	X	X	66.13	70.77 m	
5	Susanne Keil (GER)	69.43	X	69.17	X	68.38	67.41	69.43 m	
6	Mihaela Melinte (ROM)	68.04	68.69	X	68.03	X	X	68.69 m	
7	Anna Mahon (USA)	66.48	65.42	68.45	64.55	68.30	67.34	68.45 m	
8	Kamila Skolimowska (POL)	66.05	68.39	X	65.83	X	65.85	68.39 m	
9	Candice Scott (TRI)	66.75	66.80	67.73				67.73 m	
10	Lorraine Shaw (GBR)	65.66	65.95	63.92				65.95 m	
11	Betty Heidler (GER)	65.81	64.20	X				65.81 m	
—	Melissa Price (USA)	X	X	62.34				DSQ	

== See also ==
- Athletics at the 2003 Pan American Games - Women's hammer throw
- 2003 Hammer Throw Year Ranking
