= Bronwyn Eagles =

Australian hammer thrower

Personal information
- Nationality: Australia
- Born: 23 August 1980 (age 45) Camden, New South Wales
- Height: 1.78 m (5 ft 10 in)
- Weight: 100 kg (220 lb)

Sport
- Sport: Athletics
Medal record
Women's athletics
Representing Australia
World Championships
Bronze medal – third place	2001 Edmonton	Hammer throw
Commonwealth Games
Silver medal – second place	2002 Manchester	Hammer throw
Oceania Championships
Gold medal – first place	2010 Cairns	Hammer throw
- Updated on 24 April 2013

Bronwyn Eagles (born 23 August 1980) is an Australian Olympic athlete who competes in the hammer throw.

Eagles won one junior and six Australian Championships in the women's hammer throw event in her career. Other career highlights include a bronze medal at the World Championships and a silver medal at the Commonwealth Games.

In 2008, two years after her retirement, Eagles resumed competition and went on to win her sixth national title at the Australian Championships.

== Achievements ==
Year	Competition	Venue	Position	Event	Notes
Representing Australia
1998	World Junior Championships	Annecy, France	8th	Hammer	56.77 m
2001	World Championships	Edmonton, Canada	3rd	Hammer throw	68.87 m
2002	Commonwealth Games	Manchester, United Kingdom	2nd	Hammer throw	65.24 m
2003	World Championships	Paris, France	15th	Hammer throw	64.97 m
2004	Olympic Games	Athens, Greece	32nd	Hammer throw	64.09 m
2010	Oceania Championships	Cairns, Australia	1st	Hammer throw	62.99 m CR

== National championships ==
- Hammer throw: 2001, 2002, 2004, 2005, 2008, 2009 (6)

== See also ==
- Australian athletics champions (Women)
