= Iryna Sekachova =

Ukrainian hammer thrower

Personal information
- Born: 21 July 1976 (age 50) Vasylkiv, Kyiv, Soviet Union

Sport
- Sport: Track and field

Iryna V'iacheslavivna Sekachova (Ukrainian: Ірина В'ячеславівна Секачова; born 21 July 1976) is a Ukrainian hammer thrower. Her personal best throw is 74.52 metres, achieved in July 2008 in Kyiv.

== Achievements ==
| Year | Competition | Venue | Position | Notes |
Representing Ukraine
| 1998 | European Championships | Budapest, Hungary | 21st | 55.37 m |
| 2000 | Olympic Games | Sydney, Australia | 16th | 61.44 m |
| 2001 | Universiade | Beijing, China | 10th | 62.87 m |
| 2002 | European Championships | Munich, Germany | 14th | 63.13 m |
| 2003 | World Championships | Paris, France | 32nd | 61.23 m |
| 2003 | World Athletics Final | Szombathely, Hungary | 7th | 66.46 m |
| 2004 | Olympic Games | Athens, Greece | 8th | 70.40 m |
| 2004 | World Athletics Final | Szombathely, Hungary | 7th | 69.43 m |
| 2005 | World Championships | Helsinki, Finland | 6th | 69,65 m |
| 2006 | European Championships | Gothenburg, Sweden | 8th | 69.08 m |
| 2008 | Olympic Games | Beijing, PR China | 25th | 67.47 m |
| 2009 | World Championships | Berlin, Germany | 27th | 66.69 m |
