= Mia Strömmer =

Finnish hammer thrower

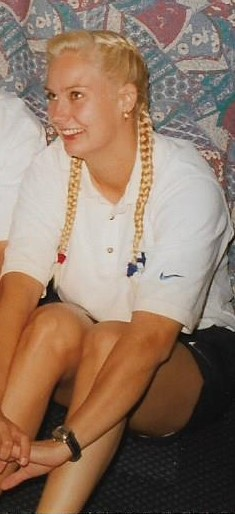
MiaStrommerBudapest1998

Mia Marianne Strömmer (born February 26, 1974, in Tampere) is a retired female hammer thrower from Finland. She set her personal best throw (69.63 metres) on March 24, 2001, in Potchefstroom. That mark was the national record until 2019.

== Achievements ==
Year	Competition	Venue	Position	Notes
Representing Finland
1998	European Championships	Budapest, Hungary	18th	57.40 m
2000	Olympic Games	Sydney, Australia	22nd	59.43 m
2001	World Championships	Edmonton, Canada	24th	61.04 m
2002	European Championships	Munich, Germany	18th	57.40 m
