= Lyudmila Gubkina =

Belarusian hammer thrower

Personal information
- Born: 13 August 1973 (age 53) Novopolotsk, Soviet Union

Sport
- Sport: Track and field
Medal record
Representing Belarus
Summer Universiade
Silver medal – second place	1999 Palma de Mallorca	Hammer throw
Bronze medal – third place	2001 Beijing	Hammer throw

Lyudmila Gubkina (Belarusian: Людміла Губкіна; born 13 August 1973) is a Belarusian hammer thrower. Her personal best is 69.92 metres, achieved in August 2000 in Minsk.

== Achievements ==
Year	Competition	Venue	Position	Notes
Representing Belarus
1997	Summer Universiade	Catania, Italy	4th	63.48 m
1998	European Championships	Budapest, Hungary	6th	63.03 m
1999	World Championships	Seville, Spain	6th	65.44 m
1999	Summer Universiade	Palma de Mallorca, Spain	2nd	68.27 m
2000	Olympic Games	Sydney, Australia	6th	67.08 m
2001	Summer Universiade	Beijing, China	3rd	67.97 m
2001	World Championships	Edmonton, Canada	19th	63.58 m
2002	European Championships	Munich, Germany	18th	62.18 m
