= Athletics at the 2001 Goodwill Games =

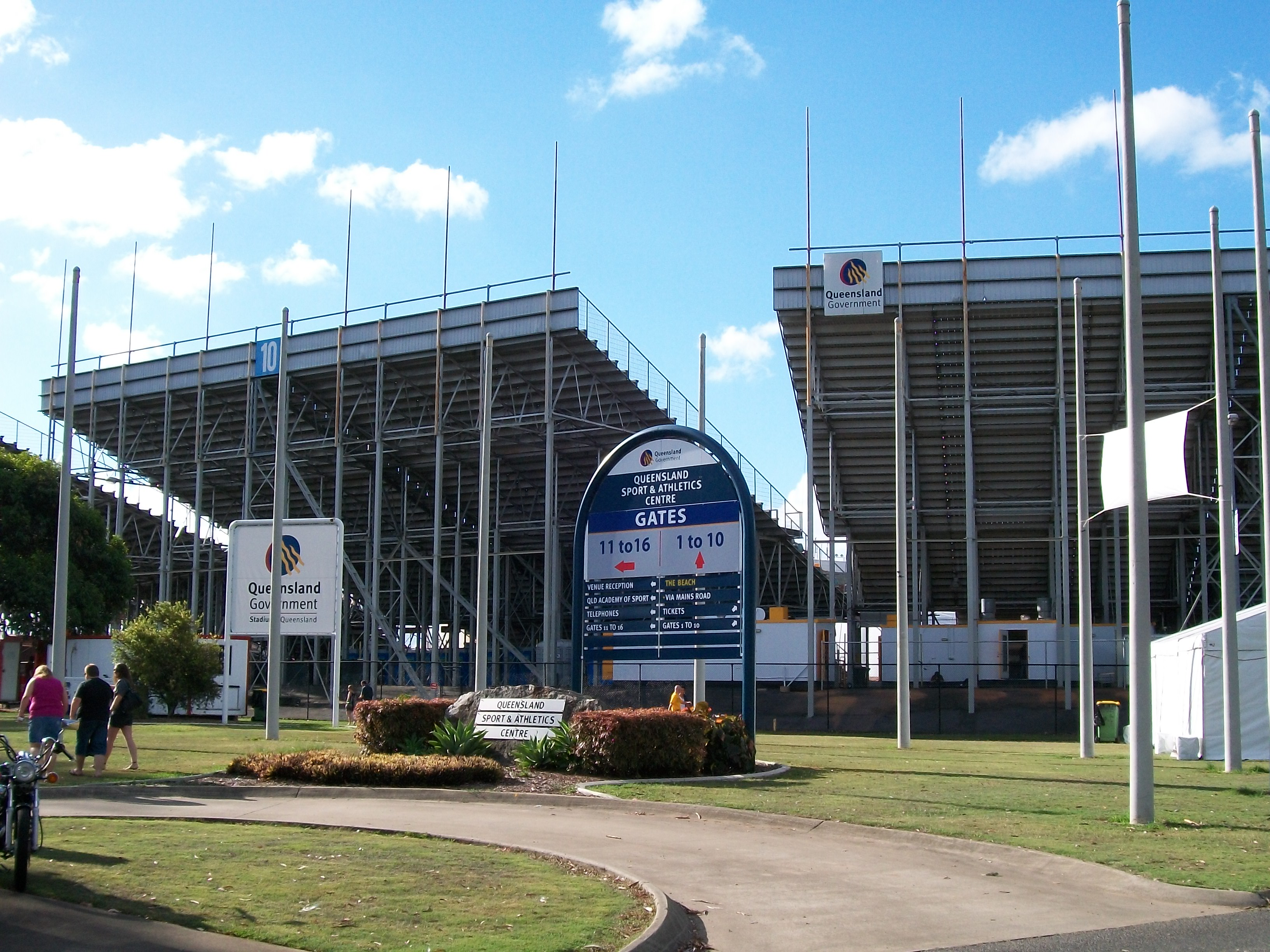
- Dates: 4–7 September
- Host city: Brisbane, Australia
- Venue: ANZ Stadium
- Events: 44
- Participation: 337 athletes from 51 nations
- Records set: 1 world record 7 Games records

At the 2001 Goodwill Games, the athletics events were held at the ANZ Stadium in Brisbane, Australia from 4–7 September. A total of 44 events were contested, with 22 events each for male and female athletes.

== Records ==
Name	Event	Country	Record	Type
Olimpiada Ivanova	20,000 metres track walk	Russia	1:26:52.3	WR
Key:WR — World record • AR — Area record • GR — Games record • NR — National record

== Medal summary ==
=== Men ===
Event	Gold		Silver		Bronze	
100 metres	Dwain Chambers (GBR)	10.11	Tim Montgomery (USA)	10.27	Matt Shirvington (AUS)	10.30
200 metres	Shawn Crawford (USA)	20.17	Christopher Williams (JAM)	20.38	Joshua J. Johnson (USA)	20.54
400 metres	Leonard Byrd (USA)	45.02	Greg Haughton (JAM)	45.31	Avard Moncur (BAH)	45.56
800 metres	William Yiampoy (KEN)	1:46.49	Jean-Patrick Nduwimana (BDI)	1:46.79	Wilfred Bungei (KEN)	1:47.15
One mile	Noah Ngeny (KEN)	3:56.64	Kevin Sullivan (CAN)	3:56.81	Laban Rotich (KEN)	3:56.88
5000 metres	Paul Bitok (KEN)	15:26.10	Luke Kipkosgei (KEN)	15:26.61	John Kibowen (KEN)	15:26.63
10,000 metres	Assefa Mezgebu (ETH)	28:06.48	Benjamin Maiyo (KEN)	28:06.80	Albert Chepkurui (KEN)	28:06.86
110 metre hurdles	Allen Johnson (USA)	13.16	Anier García (CUB)	13.20	Larry Wade (USA)	13.46
400 metre hurdles	Félix Sánchez (DOM)	48.47	Llewellyn Herbert (RSA)	48.93	Hadi Soua'an Al-Somaily (KSA)	48.94
3000 metre steeplechase	Brahim Boulami (MAR)	8:17.73	Reuben Kosgei (KEN)	8:18.63	Stephen Cherono (KEN)	8:19.98
4 × 100 metre relay	Great Britain (GBR); Jonathan Barbour; Christian Malcolm; Marlon Devonish; Dwain Chambers	38.71	Australia (AUS); Matt Shirvington; Paul Di Bella; Steve Brimacombe; Adam Basil	38.92	Jamaica (JAM); Maurice Wignall; Julien Dunkley; Raymond Stewart; Christopher Williams	39.12
4 × 400 metre relay	Jamaica (JAM); Michael McDonald; Danny McFarlane; Ian Weakley; Michael Blackwood	3:01.57	Bahamas (BAH); Tim Munnings; Troy McIntosh; Carl Oliver; Avard Moncur	3:01.67	Poland (POL); Rafał Wieruszewski; Jacek Bocian; Filip Walotka; Paweł Januszewski	3:04.79
20,000 m track walk	Nathan Deakes (AUS)	1:19:48.1	Robert Korzeniowski (POL)	1:19:52.0	Roman Rasskazov (RUS)	1:21:09.0
High jump	Stefan Holm (SWE)	2.33	Vyacheslav Voronin (RUS)	2.31	Yaroslav Rybakov (RUS)	2.31
Pole vault	Tim Mack (USA)	5.80	Aleksandr Averbukh (ISR)	5.80	Dmitri Markov (AUS)	5.75
Long jump	James Beckford (JAM)	8.16	Hussein Taher Al-Sabee (KSA)	8.07	Iván Pedroso (CUB)	7.97
Triple jump	Jonathan Edwards (GBR)	17.26	Christian Olsson (SWE)	16.85	LaMark Carter (USA)	16.83
Shot put	Adam Nelson (USA)	20.91	John Godina (USA)	20.76	Manuel Martínez (ESP)	20.44
Discus throw	Dmitriy Shevchenko (RUS)	67.84	Frantz Kruger (RSA)	66.07	Virgilijus Alekna (LTU)	63.53
Hammer throw	Koji Murofushi (JPN)	82.94	Szymon Ziółkowski (POL)	80.71	Balázs Kiss (HUN)	79.51
Javelin throw	Jan Železný (CZE)	87.52	Breaux Greer (USA)	85.86	Ēriks Rags (LAT)	84.68
Decathlon	Tomáš Dvořák (CZE)	8514	Tom Pappas (USA)	8420	Erki Nool (EST)	8323

=== Women ===
Event	Gold		Silver		Bronze	
100 metres	Marion Jones (USA)	10.84	Zhanna Pintusevich-Block (UKR)	11.01	Chandra Sturrup (BAH)	11.13
200 metres	Debbie Ferguson (BAH)	22.80	Juliet Campbell (JAM)	23.17	Myriam Léonie Mani (CMR)	23.18
400 metres	Ana Guevara (MEX)	50.32	Lorraine Fenton (JAM)	50.76	Amy Mbacké Thiam (SEN)	51.25
800 metres	Maria Mutola (MOZ)	1:58.76	Kelly Holmes (GBR)	1:59.27	Stephanie Graf (AUT)	2:00.93
One mile	Violeta Szekely (ROM)	4:38.03	Tatyana Tomashova (RUS)	4:38.13	Carla Sacramento (POR)	4:39.18
5000 metres	Olga Yegorova (RUS)	15:12.22	Berhane Adere (ETH)	15:12.97	Kathy Butler (GBR)	15:17.96
10,000 metres	Derartu Tulu (ETH)	31:48.19	Ayelech Worku (ETH)	31:48.57	Susie Power (AUS)	31:50.36
100 metre hurdles	Gail Devers (USA)	12.61	Jenny Adams (USA)	12.87	Anjanette Kirkland (USA)	12.92
400 metre hurdles	Tatyana Tereshchuk (UKR)	54.47	Tonja Buford-Bailey (USA)	54.75	Yuliya Nosova (RUS)	55.27
3000 metre steeplechase	Melissa Rollison (AUS)	9:30.70	Irene Limika (KEN)	9:39.65	Yekaterina Volkova (RUS)	9:41.54
4 × 100 metre relay	World Select team Glory Alozie (NGA); Mercy Nku (NGA); Myriam Léonie Mani (CMR); Zhanna Pintusevich-Block (UKR)	42.95	United States (USA); Jenny Adams; Kelli White; Inger Miller; Chryste Gaines	42.98	Jamaica (JAM); Astia Walker; Juliet Campbell; Beverly McDonald; Merlene Frazer	43.13
4 × 400 metre relay	United States (USA); Jearl Miles Clark; Monique Hennagan; Michelle Collins; Suziann Reid	3:24.63	Jamaica (JAM); Sandie Richards; Catherine Scott; Debbie-Ann Parris; Lorraine Fenton	3:24.87	World Select team Daimí Pernía; Zulia Calatayud; Kaltouma Nadjina; Ana Guevara	3:28.07
20,000 metres track walk	Olimpiada Ivanova (RUS)	1:26:52.3 WR	Yelena Nikolayeva (RUS)	1:27:49.3	Eva Pérez (ESP)	1:32:22.4
High jump	Hestrie Cloete (RSA)	2.00	Kajsa Bergqvist (SWE)	1.97	Amy Acuff (USA); Vita Palamar (UKR)	1.93
Pole vault	Stacy Dragila (USA)	4.55	Svetlana Feofanova (RUS)	4.45	Tatiana Grigorieva (AUS)	4.45
Long jump	Maurren Maggi (BRA)	6.94	Bronwyn Thompson (AUS)	6.88	Tatyana Kotova (RUS)	6.84
Triple jump	Tatyana Lebedeva (RUS)	14.58	Tereza Marinova (BUL)	14.37	Olena Hovorova (UKR)	14.25
Shot put	Larisa Peleshenko (RUS)	18.65	Yumileidi Cumbá (CUB)	18.41	Krystyna Zabawska (POL)	18.23
Discus throw	Ellina Zvereva (BLR)	66.36	Natalya Sadova (RUS)	64.11	Franka Dietzsch (GER)	62.59
Hammer throw	Kamila Skolimowska (POL)	70.31	Olga Kuzenkova (RUS)	69.98	Manuela Montebrun (FRA)	69.80
Javelin throw	Osleidys Menéndez (CUB)	66.14	Nikola Tomecková (CZE)	64.70	Mikaela Ingberg (FIN)	60.68
Heptathlon	Natalya Roshchupkina (RUS)	6373	Yelena Prokhorova (RUS)	6352	Natalya Sazanovich (BLR)	6323

== Medal table ==
* Host nation (Australia)

Rank	Nation	Gold	Silver	Bronze	Total
1	United States (USA)	9	5	7	21
2	Russia (RUS)	5	7	7	19
3	Kenya (KEN)	3	4	5	12
4	United Kingdom (UKB)	3	1	1	5
5	Cuba (CUB)	2	2	0	4
5	Ethiopia (ETH)	2	2	0	4
7	Australia (AUS)*	2	1	4	7
8	Czech Republic (CZE)	2	1	0	3
8	South Africa (SAF)	2	1	0	3
10	Jamaica (JAM)	1	8	0	9
11	Poland (POL)	1	2	1	4
12	Sweden (SWE)	1	2	0	3
13	Bahamas (BAH)	1	1	2	4
13	Ukraine (UKR)	1	1	2	4
15	Belarus (BLR)	1	0	1	2
15	World Select team	1	0	1	2
17	Brazil (BRA)	1	0	0	1
17	Dominican Republic (DOM)	1	0	0	1
17	Japan (JPN)	1	0	0	1
17	Mexico (MEX)	1	0	0	1
17	Morocco (MAR)	1	0	0	1
17	Mozambique (MOZ)	1	0	0	1
17	Romania (ROU)	1	0	0	1
24	Bulgaria (BUL)	0	1	0	1
24	Burundi (BDI)	0	1	0	1
24	Canada (CAN)	0	1	0	1
24	Estonia (EST)	0	1	0	1
24	Israel (ISR)	0	1	0	1
24	Lithuania (LTU)	0	1	0	1
30	Saudi Arabia (KSA)	0	0	2	2
30	Spain (ESP)	0	0	2	2
32	Austria (AUT)	0	0	1	1
32	Cameroon (CMR)	0	0	1	1
32	Finland (FIN)	0	0	1	1
32	France (FRA)	0	0	1	1
32	Germany (GER)	0	0	1	1
32	Hungary (HUN)	0	0	1	1
32	Latvia (LAT)	0	0	1	1
32	Portugal (POR)	0	0	1	1
32	Senegal (SEN)	0	0	1	1
Totals (40 entries)		44	44	44	132

== Participation ==
- Australia (52)
- Austria (1)
- Bahamas (6)
- Belarus (8)
- Bermuda (1)
- Brazil (2)
- Bulgaria (2)
- Burundi (2)
- Cameroon (1)
- Canada (4)
- Chad (1)
- Croatia (1)
- Cuba (13)
- Czech Republic (3)
- Dominican Republic (1)
- Estonia (3)
- Ethiopia (8)
- Finland (3)
- France (2)
- Germany (4)
- Ghana (1)
- Great Britain (11)
- Haiti (1)
- Hungary (1)
- Israel (1)
- Italy (2)
- Jamaica (21)
- Japan (1)
- Kenya (21)
- Latvia (1)
- Lithuania (1)
- Mauritius (2)
- Mexico (1)
- Morocco (2)
- Mozambique (1)
- Netherlands (2)
- New Zealand (2)
- Nigeria (1)
- Poland (11)
- Portugal (1)
- Romania (1)
- Russia (37)
- Saudi Arabia (3)
- Senegal (1)
- Slovenia (2)
- South Africa (3)
- Spain (6)
- Sweden (3)
- Trinidad and Tobago (1)
- Ukraine (6)
- United States (71)
