= Olga Kuzenkova =

Russian hammer thrower (born 1970)

Personal information
- Native name: Ольга Сергеевна Кузенкова
- Nationality: Russian
- Born: 4 October 1970 (age 56) Smolensk, Russian SFSR, Soviet Union
- Height: 1.76 m (5 ft 9 in)
- Weight: 76 kg (168 lb)

Sport
- Country: Russia
- Sport: Women's Athletics
- Event: Hammer throw
- Club: Dynamo Smolensk

Achievements and titles
- Personal best: 75.68 m (2000)
Medal record
Women's athletics
Representing Russia
Olympic Games
Gold medal – first place	2004 Athens	Hammer throw
Silver medal – second place	2000 Sydney	Hammer throw
World Championships
Silver medal – second place	1999 Seville	Hammer throw
Silver medal – second place	2001 Edmonton	Hammer throw
Silver medal – second place	2003 Paris	Hammer throw
European Championships
Gold medal – first place	2002 Munich	Hammer throw
Silver medal – second place	1998 Budapest	Hammer throw
Summer Universiade
Silver medal – second place	1997 Catania	Hammer throw

Olga Sergeyevna Kuzenkova (Russian: Ольга Серге́евна Кузенкова; born 4 October 1970 in Smolensk) is a Russian track and field athlete, the first woman to throw the hammer more than 70 meters. She has tested positive for doping.

She won gold in the women's hammer throw event at the 2004 Summer Olympics in Athens.

She trained with Aleksandr Seleznyov.

== Doping ==
In December 2012, her samples from the 2004 Olympics were retested, and she tested positive for anabolic steroids; subsequently she was under investigation by the International Amateur Athletics Federation. In 2013, samples from the 2005 World Championships were retested and Kuzenkova was found to have been doping there as well. In March 2013, she was banned from competitions for two years.

== International competitions ==
Representing Russia
Year	Competition	Venue	Position	Event	Result	Notes
1997	Universiade	Catania, Italy	2nd	Hammer throw	65.96 m	
1998	European Championships	Budapest, Hungary	2nd	Hammer throw	69.28 m	
1999	World Championships	Seville, Spain	2nd	Hammer throw	72.56 m	
2000	Olympic Games	Sydney, Australia	2nd	Hammer throw	69.77 m	
2001	World Championships	Edmonton, Canada	2nd	Hammer throw	70.61 m	
2001	Goodwill Games	Brisbane, Australia	2nd	Hammer throw	69.98 m	
2002	European Championships	Munich, Germany	1st	Hammer throw	72.94 m	
2002	World Cup	Madrid, Spain	3rd	Hammer throw	66.98 m	
2003	World Championships	Paris, France	2nd	Hammer throw	71.71 m	
2004	Olympic Games	Athens, Greece	1st	Hammer throw	75.02 m	
2005	World Championships	Helsinki, Finland	DQ (1st)	Hammer throw	75.10 m	Doping
2007	World Championships	Osaka, Japan	22nd (q)	Hammer throw	66.56 m	
dq = disqualified (q) = qualifying round

== See also ==
- List of doping cases in athletics
- List of Olympic medalists in athletics (women)
- List of World Athletics Championships medalists (women)
- List of European Athletics Championships medalists (women)
- List of Australian athletics champions (women)
- List of 2004 Summer Olympics medal winners
- List of 2000 Summer Olympics medal winners
- List of hammer throwers
- List of masters athletes
- List of Russian sportspeople
- Hammer throw at the Olympics
- Russia at the World Athletics Championships
- Doping at the World Athletics Championships

Records
Preceded by Mihaela Melinte	Women's Hammer World Record Holder; 5 June 1995 – 3 March 1997	Succeeded by Mihaela Melinte
Preceded by Mihaela Melinte	Women's Hammer World Record Holder; 11 June 1997 – 13 May 1999	Succeeded by Mihaela Melinte
