= Track and field at the 2011 Military World Games – Women's hammer throw =

The women's hammer throw event at the 2011 Military World Games was held on 22 July at the Estádio Olímpico João Havelange.

== Records ==
Prior to this competition, the existing world and CISM record were as follows:

World Record	Betty Heidler (GER)	81.08	Halle, Germany	21 May 2011
CISM World Record	Wenxiu Zhang (CHN)	72.25	Hyderabad, India	15 October 2007

== Schedule ==
Date	Time	Round
22 July 2011	09:40	Final

== Medalists ==
Gold	Silver	Bronze
Wenxiu Zhang; China	Nataliya Zolotukhina; Ukraine	Rosa Rodríguez; Venezuela

== Results ==
=== Final ===
Rank	Athlete	Nationality	#1	#2	#3	#4	#5	#6	Result	Notes
1st place, gold medalist(s)	Wenxiu Zhang	China	73.88	71.11	x	74.29	72.24	x	74.29	CR
2nd place, silver medalist(s)	Nataliya Zolotukhina	Ukraine	65.37	67.46	66.70	66.86	67.93	67.01	67.93	
3rd place, bronze medalist(s)	Rosa Rodríguez	Venezuela	x	62.73	67.16	x	66.71	66.55	67.16	
4	Martina Hrasnova	Slovakia	65.35	64.20	66.10	62.96	66.08	x	66.10	
5	Xia Youlian	China	57.43	59.05	59.33	55.69	58.30	53.52	59.33	
	Ahymara Espinoza	Venezuela	x	DNF					DNF	
