= 2002 World Junior Championships in Athletics – Women's hammer throw =

The women's hammer throw event at the 2002 World Junior Championships in Athletics was held in Kingston, Jamaica, at National Stadium on 19 and 20 July.

== Medalists ==
Gold	Ivana Brkljačić; Croatia
Silver	Martina Danisová; Slovakia
Bronze	Yuliya Rozenfeld; Russia

== Results ==
=== Final ===
20 July

Rank	Name	Nationality	Attempts						Result	Notes
Rank	Name	Nationality	1	2	3	4	5	6	Result	Notes
1st place, gold medalist(s)	Ivana Brkljačić	Croatia	63.80	x	64.77	65.18	65.39	64.23	65.39	
2nd place, silver medalist(s)	Martina Danisová	Slovakia	61.38	x	62.14	63.91	60.17	62.63	63.91	
3rd place, bronze medalist(s)	Yuliya Rozenfeld	Russia	58.58	60.83	58.23	57.27	56.85	51.70	60.83	
4	Gabrielle Neighbour	Australia	56.28	57.94	60.17	x	55.22	56.21	60.17	
5	Jennifer Dahlgren	Argentina	57.99	53.48	59.48	56.67	56.29	54.49	59.48	
6	Stéphanie Falzon	France	56.26	x	56.71	x	58.52	58.72	58.72	
7	Nataliya Zolotukhina	Ukraine	51.56	56.71	57.04	58.47	x	58.01	58.47	
8	Karin Engström	Sweden	57.01	x	51.88	x	x	56.81	57.01	
9	Berta Castells	Spain	54.82	55.41	52.61				55.41	
10	Mariya Smolyachkova	Belarus	x	45.28	53.37				53.37	
11	Yekaterina Khoroshikh	Russia	x	53.22	x				53.22	
12	Emma Olsson	Sweden	51.91	51.08	x				51.91	

=== Qualifications ===
19 Jul

==== Group A ====
Rank	Name	Nationality	Attempts			Result	Notes
Rank	Name	Nationality	1	2	3	Result	Notes
1	Berta Castells	Spain	x	60.45	-	60.45	Q
2	Yuliya Rozenfeld	Russia	56.73	59.66	-	59.66	Q
3	Ivana Brkljačić	Croatia	59.63	-	-	59.63	Q
4	Karin Engström	Sweden	51.36	x	58.36	58.36	q
5	Mariya Smolyachkova	Belarus	58.10	x	x	58.10	q
6	Gabrielle Neighbour	Australia	57.36	56.97	57.80	57.80	q
7	Stéphanie Falzon	France	54.83	56.07	56.98	56.98	q
8	Laura Douglas	United Kingdom	52.30	x	52.65	52.65	
9	Zhang Wenxiu	China	x	52.31	x	52.31	
10	Mona Holm	Norway	49.00	x	52.03	52.03	
11	Maris Rõngelep	Estonia	x	51.73	x	51.73	
12	Izabela Olszewska	Poland	x	49.37	x	49.37	
13	Olga Shogoleva	Uzbekistan	46.67	x	43.26	46.67	
	Jennifer Hadfield	Germany	x	x	x	NM	
	Éva Orbán	Hungary	x	x	x	NM	
	Ana Durão	Portugal	x	x	x	NM	

==== Group B ====
Rank	Name	Nationality	Attempts			Result	Notes
Rank	Name	Nationality	1	2	3	Result	Notes
1	Nataliya Zolotukhina	Ukraine	59.20	-	-	59.20	Q
2	Martina Danisová	Slovakia	59.04	-	-	59.04	Q
3	Yekaterina Khoroshikh	Russia	x	58.23	x	58.23	q
4	Emma Olsson	Sweden	55.80	57.11	x	57.11	q
5	Jennifer Dahlgren	Argentina	55.74	57.05	50.29	57.05	q
6	Kristen Michalski	United States	56.97	x	53.99	56.97	
7	Adriana Benaventa	Venezuela	x	56.04	55.85	56.04	
8	Lenka Ledvinová	Czech Republic	53.12	55.50	x	55.50	
9	Sarah Luyimi-Mbala	Belgium	50.70	54.29	x	54.29	
10	Betty Heidler	Germany	53.82	x	x	53.82	
11	Nicola Dudman	United Kingdom	x	51.08	52.56	52.56	
12	Nina Cotolupenco	Moldova	x	46.93	50.29	50.29	
13	Olivia Waldet	France	x	50.20	x	50.20	
14	Andrea Kéri	Hungary	x	x	49.43	49.43	
15	Valentina Srsa	Croatia	x	48.67	x	48.67	

== Participation ==
According to an unofficial count, 31 athletes from 24 countries participated in the event.

- Argentina (1)
- Australia (1)
- Belarus (1)
- Belgium (1)
- China (1)
- Croatia (2)
- Czech Republic (1)
- Estonia (1)
- France (2)
- Germany (2)
- Hungary (2)
- Moldova (1)
- Norway (1)
- Poland (1)
- Portugal (1)
- Russia (2)
- Slovakia (1)
- Spain (1)
- Sweden (2)
- Ukraine (1)
- United Kingdom (2)
- United States (1)
- Uzbekistan (1)
- Venezuela (1)
