= 2001 European Athletics U23 Championships – Women's hammer throw =

The women's hammer throw event at the 2001 European Athletics U23 Championships was held in Amsterdam, Netherlands, at Olympisch Stadion on 12 and 13 July.

== Medalists ==
Gold	Manuela Montebrun; France
Silver	Sini Pöyry; Finland
Bronze	Cecilia Nilsson; Sweden

== Results ==
=== Final ===
13 July

Rank	Name	Nationality	Attempts						Result	Notes
Rank	Name	Nationality	1	2	3	4	5	6	Result	Notes
1st place, gold medalist(s)	Manuela Montebrun	France	57.58	65.61	62.63	66.40	66.73	65.04	66.73	
2nd place, silver medalist(s)	Sini Pöyry	Finland	62.40	63.96	64.43	x	x	64.71	64.71	
3rd place, bronze medalist(s)	Cecilia Nilsson	Sweden	60.14	61.72	x	61.65	64.06	x	64.06	
4	Vânia Silva	Portugal	x	63.01	63.64	60.25	60.58	63.49	63.64	
5	Merja Korpela	Finland	58.70	62.44	60.16	62.71	63.51	57.65	63.51	
6	Tatyana Gromoda	Belarus	59.20	58.47	55.88	62.06	60.88	63.13	63.13	
7	Bianca Achilles	Germany	x	60.41	x	x	61.07	60.28	61.07	
8	Julianna Tudja	Hungary	57.93	x	60.00	x	x	60.52	60.52	
9	Livia Marx	Hungary	57.31	58.80	59.14				59.14	
10	Wendy Koolhaas	Netherlands	56.83	58.47	58.51				58.51	
11	Kaisa Kintonen	Finland	x	55.56	x				55.56	
12	Alexandra Papageorgiou	Greece	52.54	x	x				52.54	

=== Qualifications ===
12 July
Qualifying 63.00 or 12 best to the Final

==== Group A ====
Rank	Name	Nationality	Result	Notes
1	Bianca Achilles	Germany	60.80	q
2	Merja Korpela	Finland	60.33	q
3	Tatyana Gromoda	Belarus	60.07	q
4	Julianna Tudja	Hungary	59.10	q
5	Kaisa Kintonen	Finland	58.29	q
6	Wendy Koolhaas	Netherlands	57.94	q
7	Sónia Alves	Portugal	57.70	
8	Barbara Németh	Hungary	57.66	
9	Yelena Tauryanina	Russia	57.53	
10	Clarissa Claretti	Italy	56.51	
11	Amélie Perrin	France	56.33	
12	Maria José Conde	Portugal	55.21	
13	Marie Hilmersson	Sweden	53.71	
14	Zübeyde Yıldız	Turkey	50.75	

==== Group B ====
Rank	Name	Nationality	Result	Notes
1	Manuela Montebrun	France	64.03	Q
2	Vânia Silva	Portugal	62.18	q
3	Sini Pöyry	Finland	61.32	q
5	Livia Marx	Hungary	59.31	q
6	Alexandra Papageorgiou	Greece	58.32	q
7	Olga Markevich	Belarus	57.36	
8	Eileen O'Keeffe	Ireland	57.08	
9	Debby van der Schilt	Netherlands	56.68	
10	Eva Danielsen	Norway	55.76	
11	Zoe Derham	United Kingdom	55.53	
12	Eva Charfreitagová	Slovakia	54.55	
13	Virginia Balut	Romania	53.67	
14	Klára Chytrá	Czech Republic	51.33	

== Participation ==
According to an unofficial count, 28 athletes from 18 countries participated in the event.

- Belarus (2)
- Czech Republic (1)
- Finland (3)
- France (2)
- Germany (1)
- Greece (1)
- Hungary (3)
- Ireland (1)
- Italy (1)
- Netherlands (2)
- Norway (1)
- Portugal (3)
- Romania (1)
- Russia (1)
- Slovakia (1)
- Sweden (2)
- Turkey (1)
- United Kingdom (1)
