= Athletics at the 2015 Pan American Games – Women's hammer throw =

Women's hammer throw at the 2015 Pan American Games
- Venue: CIBC Pan Am and Parapan Am Athletics Stadium
- Dates: July 21
- Competitors: 9 from 6 nations
- Winning distance: 71.61

Medalists
Gold medal	Rosa Rodríguez	Venezuela
Silver medal	Amber Campbell	United States
Bronze medal	Sultana Frizell	Canada

The women's hammer throw competition of the athletics events at the 2015 Pan American Games took place on July 21 at the CIBC Pan Am and Parapan Am Athletics Stadium. The defending Pan American Games champion is Yipsi Moreno of Cuba.

== Records ==
Prior to this competition, the existing world and Pan American Games records were as follows:

World record	Betty Heidler (GER)	79.42	Halle, Germany	May 21, 2011
Pan American Games record	Yipsi Moreno (CUB)	75.62	Guadalajara, Mexico	October 24, 2011

== Qualification ==
Each National Olympic Committee (NOC) was able to enter up to two entrants providing they had met the minimum standard (61.85) in the qualifying period (January 1, 2014 to June 28, 2015).

== Schedule ==
Date	Time	Round
July 21, 2015	19:35	Final

== Results ==
All results shown are in meters.

KEY:	q	Best non-qualifiers	Q	Qualified	NR	National record	PB	Personal best	SB	Seasonal best	DQ	Disqualified

=== Final ===
Rank	Name	Nationality	#1	#2	#3	#4	#5	#6	Mark	Notes
1st place, gold medalist(s)	Rosa Rodríguez	Venezuela	68.06	71.14	67.44	71.02	71.61	x	71.61	
2nd place, silver medalist(s)	Amber Campbell	United States	x	68.12	70.99	x	71.22	71.12	71.22	
3rd place, bronze medalist(s)	Sultana Frizell	Canada	68.90	x	63.70	x	69.51	68.82	69.51	
4	DeAnna Price	United States	66.17	67.78	67.00	66.71	65.55	68.84	68.84	
5	Yirisleydi Ford	Cuba	x	x	65.21	65.73	x	x	65.73	
6	Ariannis Vichy	Cuba	65.60	63.17	x	x	x	63.24	65.60	
7	Jennifer Dahlgren	Argentina	x	63.06	x	65.33	x	x	65.33	
	Heather Steacy	Canada	x	x	x				NM	
	Daina Levy	Jamaica	x	x	x				NM	
