= 2003 European Athletics U23 Championships – Women's hammer throw =

The women's hammer throw event at the 2003 European Athletics U23 Championships was held in Bydgoszcz, Poland, at Zawisza Stadion on 17 and 20 July.

== Medalists ==
Gold	Kamila Skolimowska; Poland
Silver	Aksana Menkova; Belarus
Bronze	Gulfiya Khanafeyeva; Russia

== Results ==
=== Final ===
20 July

Rank	Name	Nationality	Attempts						Result	Notes
Rank	Name	Nationality	1	2	3	4	5	6	Result	Notes
1st place, gold medalist(s)	Kamila Skolimowska	Poland	69.24	71.38	65.75	69.48	–	62.48	71.38	CR
2nd place, silver medalist(s)	Aksana Menkova	Belarus	65.12	x	67.58	65.83	66.40	65.71	67.58	
3rd place, bronze medalist(s)	Gulfiya Khanafeyeva	Russia	65.08	66.98	64.73	65.38	x	65.39	66.98	
4	Betty Heidler	Germany	x	60.97	63.22	66.49	65.57	x	66.49	
5	Tatyana Lysenko	Russia	63.58	51.76	64.48	63.31	63.74	x	64.48	
6	Merja Korpela	Finland	60.85	63.02	58.96	63.04	64.44	63.24	64.44	
7	Sanja Gavrilović	Croatia	61.37	63.10	x	62.69	63.39	63.88	63.88	
8	Ivana Brkljačić	Croatia	62.92	x	x	63.04	x	x	63.04	
9	Bianca Achilles	Germany	62.51	x	59.54				62.51	
10	Debby van der Schilt	Netherlands	59.52	61.90	x				61.90	
11	Shirley Webb	Great Britain	58.71	x	59.81				59.81	
	Marina Lapina	Azerbaijan	x	x	x				NM	

=== Qualifications ===
17 July
Qualifying 64.50 or 12 best to the Final

==== Group A ====
Rank	Name	Nationality	Result	Notes
1	Gulfiya Khanafeyeva	Russia	65.28	Q
2	Merja Korpela	Finland	63.97	q
3	Ivana Brkljačić	Croatia	63.31	q
4	Bianca Achilles	Germany	63.01	q
5	Martina Danišová	Slovakia	60.36	
6	Małgorzata Zadura	Poland	59.81	
7	Eileen O'Keeffe	Ireland	59.64	
8	Stiliani Papadopoulou	Greece	58.68	
9	Katariina Lahti	Finland	57.95	
10	Marie Hilmersson	Sweden	54.43	
11	Aurélie Philippon	France	53.92	
12	Rebecka Kvist	Sweden	47.95	
	Alina Joaca Bine	Romania	NM	

==== Group B ====
Rank	Name	Nationality	Result	Notes
1	Kamila Skolimowska	Poland	66.02	Q
2	Aksana Menkova	Belarus	65.98	Q
3	Betty Heidler	Germany	63.41	q
4	Sanja Gavrilović	Croatia	62.93	q
5	Shirley Webb	Great Britain	61.90	q
6	Debby van der Schilt	Netherlands	61.57	q
7	Tatyana Lysenko	Russia	61.32	q
8	Marina Lapina	Azerbaijan	61.18	q
9	Stéphanie Falzon	France	59.15	
10	Mona Holm	Norway	57.31	
11	Elisa Palmieri	Italy	53.57	
12	Johanna Doyle	Ireland	53.19	
13	Jenni Viljanen	Finland	52.88	
	Karin Engström	Sweden	NM	

== Participation ==
According to an unofficial count, 27 athletes from 17 countries participated in the event.

- Azerbaijan (1)
- Belarus (1)
- Croatia (2)
- Finland (3)
- France (2)
- Germany (2)
- Great Britain (1)
- Greece (1)
- Ireland (2)
- Italy (1)
- Netherlands (1)
- Norway (1)
- Poland (2)
- Romania (1)
- Russia (2)
- Slovakia (1)
- Sweden (3)
