= Alexandra Papageorgiou =

Greek hammer thrower

Alexandra Papageorgiou (Greek: Αλεξάνδρα Παπαγεωργίου, born December 17, 1980) is a hammer thrower from Athens, Greece. Her personal best throw is 70.73 metres, achieved on August 1, 2009, in Thessaloniki. This places her second on the Greek all-time list, behind Stiliani Papadopoulou.

== Achievements ==
Year	Competition	Venue	Position	Notes
Representing Greece
1999	European Junior Championships	Riga, Latvia	21st (q)	49.23 m
2001	European U23 Championships	Amsterdam, Netherlands	12th	52.54 m
2001	Mediterranean Games	Tunis, Tunisia	3rd	62.87 m
2002	European Championships	Munich, Germany	7th	66.49 m
2003	World Championships	Paris, France	18th (q)	64.72 m
2004	Olympic Games	Athens, Greece	12th	66.83 m
2005	Mediterranean Games	Almería, Spain	3rd	67.13 m
2006	European Championships	Gothenburg, Sweden	9th	67.95 m
2006	World Cup	Athens, Greece	8th	65.22 m
2007	World Championships	Osaka, Japan	18th (q)	66.88 m
2008	Olympic Games	Beijing, PR China	28th (q)	66.72 m
2009	World Championships	Berlin, Germany	28th (q)	66.33 m
2011	World Championships	Daegu, South Korea	22nd (q)	66.77 m
