= 2007 World Championships in Athletics – Women's hammer throw =

The Women's Hammer Throw event at the 2007 World Championships in Athletics took place on August 28, 2007 (qualification) and August 30, 2007 (final) at the Nagai Stadium in Osaka, Japan. The qualification standard was set at 71.00 metres.

The winning margin was 2 cm. As of 2024, this remains the only time the women's hammer throw was won by less than 4 cm at these championships.

== Medalists ==
Gold	Betty Heidler; Germany (GER)
Silver	Yipsi Moreno; Cuba (CUB)
Bronze	Zhang Wenxiu; China (CHN)

== Schedule ==
- All times are Japan Standard Time (UTC+9)

Qualification Round
Group A	Group B
28.08.2007 – 10:00h	28.08.2007 – 11:35h
Final Round
30.08.2007 – 19:30h

== Abbreviations ==
- All results shown are in metres

Q	automatic qualification
q	qualification by rank
DNS	did not start
NM	no mark
WR	world record
AR	area record
NR	national record
PB	personal best
SB	season best

== Records ==
Standing records prior to the 2007 World Athletics Championships
World Record	Tatyana Lysenko (RUS)	77.80 m	August 15, 2006	Tallinn, Estonia
Championships Record	Mihaela Melinte (ROM)	75.20 m	August 24, 1999	Seville, Spain
Season Best	Tatyana Lysenko (RUS)	77.30 m	April 22, 2007	Bogatyr Adler, Russia

== Qualification ==
=== Group A ===
Rank	Overall	Athlete	Nation	Attempts			Distance	Note
Rank	Overall	Athlete	Nation	1	2	3	Distance	Note
1	1	Ivana Brkljačić	Croatia	74.69	—	—	74.69 m	Q
2	3	Betty Heidler	Germany	X	72.27	—	72.27 m	Q
3	8	Manuela Montebrun	France	69.02	69.77	69.40	69.77 m	q
4	10	Arasay Thondike	Cuba	69.14	68.39	X	69.14 m	q
5	11	Gulfiya Khanafeyeva	Russia	65.91	X	68.65	68.65 m	q
6	13	Martina Danišová	Slovakia	X	67.13	68.15	68.15 m	
7	14	Cecilia Nilsson	Sweden	68.09	67.01	64.30	68.09 m	
8	18	Alexandra Papayeoryiou	Greece	66.88	X	X	66.88 m	
9	19	Yelena Priyma	Russia	X	61.79	66.84	66.84 m	
10	23	Sviatlana Sudak-Torun	Turkey	65.65	65.22	X	65.65 m	
11	25	Jennifer Dahlgren	Argentina	65.64	X	X	65.64 m	
12	30	Berta Castells	Spain	63.32	X	60.93	63.32 m	
13	31	Liu Yinghui	China	X	62.83	62.62	62.83 m	
14	32	Masumi Aya	Japan	61.55	62.68	59.43	62.68 m	
15	33	Mihaela Melinte	Romania	X	X	62.40	62.40 m	
16	34	Vânia Silva	Portugal	X	56.28	61.81	61.81 m	
17	36	Katalin Divós	Hungary	57.22	59.45	58.61	59.45 m	
18	38	Brittany Riley	United States	X	X	55.72	55.72 m	
—	—	Susanne Keil	Germany	X	X	X	NM	
—	—	Aksana Miankova	Belarus	X	X	X	NM	

=== Group B ===
Rank	Overall	Athlete	Nation	Attempts			Distance	Note
Rank	Overall	Athlete	Nation	1	2	3	Distance	Note
1	2	Yipsi Moreno	Cuba	72.87	—	—	72.87 m	Q SB
2	4	Zhang Wenxiu	China	X	71.31	—	71.31 m	Q
3	5	Eileen O'Keeffe	Ireland	71.07	—	—	71.07 m	Q
4	6	Yelena Konevtseva	Russia	70.29	70.65	—	70.65 m	q
5	7	Kamila Skolimowska	Poland	66.57	69.57	70.18	70.18 m	q
6	9	Clarissa Claretti	Italy	X	X	69.53	69.53 m	q
7	12	Yunaika Crawford	Cuba	65.64	66.80	68.55	68.55 m	q
8	15	Jessica Cosby	United States	63.44	67.90	66.36	67.90 m	
9	16	Merja Korpela	Finland	67.87	65.89	X	67.87 m	
10	17	Stéphanie Falzon	France	66.37	66.82	67.19	67.19 m	
11	20	Amélie Perrin	France	X	66.67	66.51	66.67 m	
12	21	Lenka Ledvinová	Czech Republic	66.57	63.22	65.71	66.57 m	
13	22	Olga Kuzenkova	Russia	66.56	X	65.09	66.56 m	
14	24	Mona Holm	Norway	X	63.16	65.65	65.65 m	
15	26	Kristal Yush	United States	61.74	64.24	64.63	64.63 m	
16	27	Bianca Perie	Romania	64.18	60.09	62.10	64.18 m	
17	28	Kathrin Klaas	Germany	X	X	64.00	64.00 m	
18	29	Nataliya Zolotukhina	Ukraine	61.27	63.64	62.58	63.64 m	
19	35	Rosa Rodríguez	Venezuela	58.43	61.77	61.56	61.77 m	
20	37	Hao Shuai	China	X	59.09	X	59.09 m	

== Final ==
Rank	Athlete	Nation	Attempts						Distance	Note
Rank	Athlete	Nation	1	2	3	4	5	6	Distance	Note
1st place, gold medalist(s)	Betty Heidler	Germany	X	74.76	X	73.73	71.31	73.10	74.76 m	
2nd place, silver medalist(s)	Yipsi Moreno	Cuba	72.84	X	X	74.33	70.87	74.74	74.74 m	
3rd place, bronze medalist(s)	Zhang Wenxiu	China	X	73.11	X	74.21	74.39	X	74.39 m	
4	Kamila Skolimowska	Poland	73.75	70.54	65.69	70.78	70.06	70.77	73.75 m	
5	Yelena Konevtseva	Russia	72.45	70.11	X	X	70.35	68.90	72.45 m	
6	Eileen O'Keeffe	Ireland	70.93	64.27	69.06	66.90	69.21	69.38	70.93 m	
7	Clarissa Claretti	Italy	X	70.25	70.73	67.56	70.74	X	70.74 m	
8	Manuela Montebrun	France	69.77	70.36	67.42	69.16	66.41	69.92	70.36 m	
9	Arasay Thondike	Cuba	65.84	70.20	67.65				70.20 m	
10	Gulfiya Khanafeyeva	Russia	67.79	X	69.08				69.08 m	
11	Ivana Brkljačić	Croatia	68.16	X	X				68.16 m	
12	Yunaika Crawford	Cuba	67.30	X	67.56				67.56 m	

== See also ==
- 2007 in hammer throw
