= 2004 World Junior Championships in Athletics – Women's hammer throw =

The women's hammer throw event at the 2004 World Junior Championships in Athletics was held in Grosseto, Italy, at Stadio Olimpico Carlo Zecchini on 13 and 14 July.

== Medalists ==
Gold	Mariya Smolyachkova; Belarus
Silver	Yang Qiaoyu; China
Bronze	Laura Gibilisco; Italy

== Results ==
=== Final ===
14 July

Rank	Name	Nationality	Attempts						Result	Notes
Rank	Name	Nationality	1	2	3	4	5	6	Result	Notes
1st place, gold medalist(s)	Mariya Smolyachkova	Belarus	66.81	x	x	x	64.49	x	66.81	
2nd place, silver medalist(s)	Yang Qiaoyu	China	59.67	61.67	60.12	60.13	61.67	x	61.67	
3rd place, bronze medalist(s)	Laura Gibilisco	Italy	60.95	x	x	x	54.90	x	60.95	
4	Anna Bulgakova	Russia	x	60.74	x	x	x	51.79	60.74	
5	Vanda Nickl	Hungary	59.61	58.35	x	x	60.37	53.11	60.37	
6	Lenka Ledvinová	Czech Republic	x	60.18	55.80	58.31	58.09	x	60.18	
7	Malwina Sobierajska	Poland	x	58.59	x	x	x	57.09	58.59	
8	Liliya Razynkova	Ukraine	57.41	x	57.45	56.50	56.59	57.32	57.45	
9	Orsolya Németh	Hungary	x	x	57.32				57.32	
10	Nataliya Zolotukhina	Ukraine	54.98	53.71	55.55				55.55	
11	Julie Roux-Bonnardel	France	x	53.61	54.53				54.53	
12	Silvia Salis	Italy	53.76	52.91	x				53.76	

=== Qualifications ===
13 July

==== Group A ====
Rank	Name	Nationality	Attempts			Result	Notes
Rank	Name	Nationality	1	2	3	Result	Notes
1	Nataliya Zolotukhina	Ukraine	60.11	64.35	-	64.35	Q
2	Vanda Nickl	Hungary	60.36	54.53	56.12	60.36	q
3	Malwina Sobierajska	Poland	60.04	x	x	60.04	q
4	Anna Bulgakova	Russia	58.18	59.70	x	59.70	q
5	Silvia Salis	Italy	59.65	55.95	57.45	59.65	q
6	Lenka Ledvinová	Czech Republic	x	x	57.85	57.85	q
7	Julie Roux-Bonnardel	France	56.61	x	52.12	56.61	q
8	Valentina Srsa	Croatia	x	x	55.60	55.60	
9	Melanie Motzenbäcker	Germany	54.90	x	53.68	54.90	
10	Nina Schvedoff	Finland	x	52.55	x	52.55	
11	Ana Durão	Portugal	52.13	x	52.10	52.13	
12	Eman Al-Ashry	Egypt	40.61	51.42	50.62	51.42	
13	Tuğçe Şahutoğlu	Turkey	x	50.07	x	50.07	
	Laci Heller	United States	x	x	x	NM	

==== Group B ====
Rank	Name	Nationality	Attempts			Result	Notes
Rank	Name	Nationality	1	2	3	Result	Notes
1	Mariya Smolyachkova	Belarus	60.47	x	x	60.47	q
2	Yang Qiaoyu	China	59.91	60.38	60.06	60.38	q
3	Laura Gibilisco	Italy	x	x	59.01	59.01	q
4	Orsolya Németh	Hungary	54.19	57.09	53.50	57.09	q
5	Liliya Razynkova	Ukraine	55.26	56.69	x	56.69	q
6	Dorota Stonoga	Poland	x	55.91	56.14	56.14	
7	Johanna Hoppe	Germany	52.58	55.86	x	55.86	
8	Kristen Callan	United States	52.93	55.84	x	55.84	
9	Georgiana Artenie	Romania	x	54.90	49.12	54.90	
10	Mariya Bespalova	Russia	54.42	x	x	54.42	
11	Rosa Andreina Rodríguez	Venezuela	53.10	51.41	x	53.10	
12	Enxhi Toska	Albania	48.08	47.10	52.83	52.83	
13	Marisa Fernandes	Portugal	51.53	51.69	52.23	52.23	
14	Annika Hjelm	Sweden	51.72	x	x	51.72	
15	Dorotea Habazin	Croatia	x	51.64	46.25	51.64	

== Participation ==
According to an unofficial count, 29 athletes from 20 countries participated in the event.

- Albania (1)
- Belarus (1)
- China (1)
- Croatia (2)
- Czech Republic (1)
- Egypt (1)
- Finland (1)
- France (1)
- Germany (2)
- Hungary (2)
- Italy (2)
- Poland (2)
- Portugal (2)
- Romania (1)
- Russia (2)
- Sweden (1)
- Turkey (1)
- Ukraine (2)
- United States (2)
- Venezuela (1)
