= 2000 World Junior Championships in Athletics – Women's hammer throw =

The women's hammer throw event at the 2000 World Junior Championships in Athletics was held in Santiago, Chile, at Estadio Nacional Julio Martínez Prádanos on 17 and 18 October.

== Medalists ==
Gold	Ivana Brkljačić; Croatia
Silver	Virginia Balut; Romania
Bronze	Yunaika Crawford; Cuba

== Results ==
=== Final ===
18 October

Rank	Name	Nationality	Attempts						Result	Notes
Rank	Name	Nationality	1	2	3	4	5	6	Result	Notes
1st place, gold medalist(s)	Ivana Brkljačić	Croatia	62.22	60.12	61.65	60.84	61.79	x	62.22	
2nd place, silver medalist(s)	Virginia Balut	Romania	x	58.28	60.23	x	x	x	60.23	
3rd place, bronze medalist(s)	Yunaika Crawford	Cuba	59.98	59.44	59.88	57.09	56.02	57.96	59.98	
4	Merja Korpela	Finland	56.92	x	59.59	x	56.15	x	59.59	
5	Martina Danisová	Slovakia	56.74	55.09	x	57.75	x	x	57.75	
6	Natalya Kravchenko	Ukraine	56.51	54.87	53.88	54.68	x	55.29	56.51	
7	Yuliya Denisova	Russia	x	x	55.56	x	x	55.10	55.56	
8	Debby van der Schilt	Netherlands	49.48	x	55.15	x	x	x	55.15	
9	Silke Grundmann	Germany	53.08	55.08	52.46				55.08	
10	Yelena Tauryanina	Russia	53.01	54.86	x				54.86	
11	Carrie Soong	United States	x	x	54.44				54.44	
12	Eva Danielsen	Norway	x	x	47.28				47.28	

=== Qualifications ===
17 October

==== Group A ====
Rank	Name	Nationality	Attempts			Result	Notes
Rank	Name	Nationality	1	2	3	Result	Notes
1	Martina Danisová	Slovakia	59.60	-	-	59.60	Q
2	Merja Korpela	Finland	58.29	-	-	58.29	Q
3	Yuliya Denisova	Russia	55.55	51.48	54.44	55.55	q
4	Natalya Kravchenko	Ukraine	54.34	51.57	53.64	54.34	q
5	Deborah Lovely	Australia	53.11	x	52.99	53.11	
6	Katherine Johnston	United States	52.81	x	52.38	52.81	
7	Yang Meiping	China	52.58	x	51.92	52.58	
8	Nathalie Thénor	Canada	52.20	x	x	52.20	
9	Betty Heidler	Germany	x	x	52.18	52.18	
10	Kamila Skolimowska	Poland	x	x	51.84	51.84	
11	Jennifer Dahlgren	Argentina	50.49	x	x	50.49	
12	Eileen O'Keeffe	Ireland	x	50.13	49.59	50.13	
13	Sarah Luyimi-Mbala	Belgium	49.03	x	49.81	49.81	
14	Mhairi Walters	United Kingdom	39.33	47.62	48.77	48.77	
15	Maria Mercedes Melogno	Uruguay	x	x	45.63	45.63	
16	Odette Palma	Chile	x	x	43.91	43.91	

==== Group B ====
Rank	Name	Nationality	Attempts			Result	Notes
Rank	Name	Nationality	1	2	3	Result	Notes
1	Ivana Brkljačić	Croatia	62.05	-	-	62.05	Q
2	Yunaika Crawford	Cuba	59.53	-	-	59.53	Q
3	Carrie Soong	United States	58.22	-	-	58.22	Q
4	Virginia Balut	Romania	53.48	x	56.16	56.16	q
5	Yelena Tauryanina	Russia	52.40	x	55.96	55.96	q
6	Debby van der Schilt	Netherlands	55.06	55.90	x	55.90	q
7	Eva Danielsen	Norway	53.55	x	54.32	54.32	q
8	Silke Grundmann	Germany	x	54.15	53.32	54.15	q
9	Dubraska Rodríguez	Venezuela	53.82	50.97	50.80	53.82	
10	Carys Parry	United Kingdom	51.99	53.80	52.69	53.80	
11	Nicole Robertson	Australia	x	51.69	x	51.69	
12	Erin Riste	Canada	x	47.08	51.13	51.13	
13	Andrea Kéri	Hungary	50.45	47.18	50.21	50.45	
14	Monika Královenská	Slovakia	x	x	50.26	50.26	
15	Stéphanie Falzon	France	x	49.77	x	49.77	
16	Mariana La Nasa	Argentina	45.34	47.17	45.44	47.17	

== Participation ==
According to an unofficial count, 32 athletes from 24 countries participated in the event.

- Argentina (2)
- Australia (2)
- Belgium (1)
- Canada (2)
- Chile (1)
- China (1)
- Croatia (1)
- Cuba (1)
- Finland (1)
- France (1)
- Germany (2)
- Hungary (1)
- Ireland (1)
- Netherlands (1)
- Norway (1)
- Poland (1)
- Romania (1)
- Russia (2)
- Slovakia (2)
- Ukraine (1)
- United Kingdom (2)
- United States (2)
- Uruguay (1)
- Venezuela (1)
