= 2005 European Athletics U23 Championships – Women's hammer throw =

The women's hammer throw event at the 2005 European Athletics U23 Championships was held in Erfurt, Germany, at Steigerwaldstadion on 16 and 17 July.

== Medalists ==
| Gold | Yekaterina Khoroshikh; Russia |
| Silver | Betty Heidler; Germany |
| Bronze | Nataliya Zolotuhina; Ukraine |

== Results ==
=== Final ===
17 July

| Rank | Name | Nationality | Attempts | | | | | | Result | Notes |
| Rank | Name | Nationality | 1 | 2 | 3 | 4 | 5 | 6 | Result | Notes |
|---|---|---|---|---|---|---|---|---|---|---|
| 1st place, gold medalist(s) | Yekaterina Khoroshikh | Russia | 71.51 | x | 69.15 | x | 70.65 | 66.78 | 71.51 | CR |
| 2nd place, silver medalist(s) | Betty Heidler | Germany | 67.20 | 68.43 | x | 69.16 | 69.64 | x | 69.64 | |
| 3rd place, bronze medalist(s) | Nataliya Zolotuhina | Ukraine | 67.08 | 62.46 | 61.97 | 62.69 | 67.75 | x | 67.75 | |
| 4 | Kathrin Klaas | Germany | x | 66.50 | 65.34 | x | 62.76 | x | 66.50 | |
| 5 | Nadzeya Pauliukouskaya | Belarus | 65.72 | x | 66.38 | x | x | x | 66.38 | |
| 6 | Maryia Smaliachkova | Belarus | x | 62.99 | x | 66.16 | 65.63 | x | 66.16 | |
| 7 | Olivia Waldet | France | 59.72 | 62.59 | 64.31 | x | x | x | 64.31 | |
| 8 | Stéphanie Falzon | France | x | 62.76 | 62.48 | 60.46 | 60.94 | x | 62.76 | |
| 9 | Yelena Priyma | Russia | x | 60.95 | x | | | | 60.95 | |
| 10 | Tracey Andersson | Sweden | 59.76 | 58.48 | x | | | | 59.76 | |
| 11 | Éva Orbán | Hungary | 57.05 | 57.26 | x | | | | 57.26 | |
| | Berta Castells | Spain | x | x | x | | | | NM | |

=== Qualifications ===
16 July
Qualifying 64.50 or 12 best to the Final

==== Group A ====
| Rank | Name | Nationality | Result | Notes |
|---|---|---|---|---|
| 1 | Yekaterina Khoroshikh | Russia | 68.76 | Q |
| 2 | Nataliya Zolotuhina | Ukraine | 66.70 | Q |
| 3 | Éva Orbán | Hungary | 65.71 | Q |
| 4 | Nadzeya Pauliukouskaya | Belarus | 65.54 | Q |
| 5 | Kathrin Klaas | Germany | 65.45 | Q |
| 6 | Tracey Andersson | Sweden | 61.95 | q |
| 7 | Stéphanie Falzon | France | 61.76 | q |
| 8 | Laura Douglas | Great Britain | 57.42 | |
| 9 | Malwina Sobierajska | Poland | 57.33 | |
| 10 | Elisa Palmieri | Italy | 57.07 | |
| 11 | Maris Röngelep | Estonia | 56.64 | |

==== Group B ====
| Rank | Name | Nationality | Result | Notes |
|---|---|---|---|---|
| 1 | Betty Heidler | Germany | 65.62 | Q |
| 2 | Maryia Smaliachkova | Belarus | 65.31 | Q |
| 3 | Berta Castells | Spain | 64.50 | Q |
| 4 | Yelena Priyma | Russia | 63.24 | q |
| 5 | Olivia Waldet | France | 62.94 | q |
| 6 | Silvia Salis | Italy | 59.59 | |
| 7 | Laëtitia Bambara | France | 59.24 | |
| 8 | Mona Holm | Norway | 58.54 | |
| 9 | Vanda Nickl | Hungary | 58.37 | |
| 10 | Katarzyna Kita | Poland | 57.10 | |
| 11 | Karin Engström | Sweden | 56.65 | |

== Participation ==
According to an unofficial count, 22 athletes from 13 countries participated in the event.

- Belarus (2)
- Estonia (1)
- France (3)
- Germany (2)
- Great Britain (1)
- Hungary (2)
- Italy (2)
- Norway (1)
- Poland (2)
- Russia (2)
- Spain (1)
- Sweden (2)
- Ukraine (1)
