= 2002 European Athletics Championships – Women's hammer throw =

Women's hammer throw at the European Athletics Championships

The final of the Women's hammer throw event at the 2002 European Championships in Munich, Germany was held on August 9, 2002. There were a total number of 44 participating athletes. The qualifying rounds were staged two days earlier, on August 7, with the mark set at 66.00 metres.

On 8 March 2013, the IAAF announced that following retesting of samples taken at the championships, it had been found that Olga Kuzenkova of Russia had taken a banned substance. It was not announced whether this would mean an alteration in the medal result.

== Medalists ==
Gold	Olga Kuzenkova; Russia (RUS)
Silver	Kamila Skolimowska; Poland (POL)
Bronze	Manuela Montebrun; France (FRA)

== Abbreviations ==
- All results shown are in metres

Q	automatic qualification
q	qualification by rank
DNS	did not start
NM	no mark
WR	world record
AR	area record
NR	national record
PB	personal best
SB	season best

== Records ==
Standing records prior to the 2002 European Athletics Championships
World Record	Mihaela Melinte (ROM)	76.07 m	August 29, 1999	Rüdlingen, Switzerland
Event Record	Mihaela Melinte (ROM)	71.17 m	August 22, 1998	Budapest, Hungary
Broken records during the 2002 European Athletics Championships
Event Record	Olga Kuzenkova (RUS)	72.30 m	August 9, 2002	Munich, Germany
Event Record	Olga Kuzenkova (RUS)	72.94 m	August 9, 2002	Munich, Germany

== Qualification ==
=== Group A ===
Rank	Overall	Athlete	Attempts			Distance
Rank	Overall	Athlete	1	2	3	Distance
1	1	Olga Kuzenkova (RUS)				68.45 m
2	2	Manuela Montebrun (FRA)				67.74 m
3	4	Susanne Keil (GER)				66.67 m
4	6	Ester Balassini (ITA)				65.84 m
5	9	Alexandra Papageorgiou (GRE)				64.74 m
6	14	Iryna Sekachova (UKR)				63.13 m
7	17	Ivana Brkljačić (CRO)				62.46 m
8	20	Lorraine Shaw (GBR)				61.50 m
9	21	Julianna Tudja (HUN)				61.46 m
10	22	Volha Tsander (BLR)				61.39 m
11	23	Yelena Tauryanina (RUS)				61.22 m
12	24	Agnieszka Pogroszewska (POL)				60.87 m
13	28	Dolores Pedrares (ESP)	57.85	59.93	58.30	59.93 m
14	29	María José Conde (POR)				59.87 m
15	30	Eileen O'Keeffe (IRL)				59.64 m
16	31	Manuela Priemer (GER)				59.30 m
17	34	Katri Rasanen (FIN)				57.61 m
18	37	Eva Danielsen (NOR)				56.48 m
19	39	Eleni Teloni (CYP)				55.81 m
20	41	Wendy Koolhaas (NED)				53.99 m
21	42	Emilijana Ciko (ALB)				53.65 m
22	43	Lenka Ledvinová (CZE)				47.65 m

=== Group B ===
Rank	Overall	Athlete	Attempts			Distance
Rank	Overall	Athlete	1	2	3	Distance
1	3	Florence Ezeh (FRA)				66.84 m
2	5	Kamila Skolimowska (POL)				66.11 m
3	7	Clarissa Claretti (ITA)				65.43 m
4	8	Sini Pöyry (FIN)				64.87 m
5	10	Evdokia Tsamoglou (GRE)				64.70 m
6	11	Andrea Bunjes (GER)				64.38 m
7	12	Alla Davydova (RUS)				63.38 m
8	13	Lucie Vrbenská (CZE)				63.17 m
9	15	Cecilia Nilsson (SWE)				62.85 m
10	16	Sonia Alves (POR)				62.50 m
11	18	Lyudmila Gubkina (BLR)				62.18 m
12	19	Marina Rezanova (UKR)				61.77 m
13	25	Merja Korpela (FIN)				60.67 m
14	26	Martina Denisová (SVK)				60.28 m
15	27	Aksana Miankova (BLR)				60.13 m
16	32	Monica Torazzi (ITA)				58.38 m
17	33	Vânia Silva (POR)				58.22 m
18	35	Berta Castells (ESP)	X	57.15	56.98	57.15 m
19	36	Sanja Gavrilović (CRO)				56.98 m
20	38	Livia Marx (HUN)				56.20 m
21	40	Zübeyde Yıldız (TUR)				54.32 m
—	—	Debbie van der Schilt (NED)	X	X	X	NM

== Final ==
Rank	Athlete	Attempts						Distance	Note
Rank	Athlete	1	2	3	4	5	6	Distance	Note
1st place, gold medalist(s)	Olga Kuzenkova (RUS)	72.30	68.41	X	72.94	72.89	72.71	72.94 m	CR
2nd place, silver medalist(s)	Kamila Skolimowska (POL)	69.38	68.62	68.35	72.46	65.94	X	72.46 m	
3rd place, bronze medalist(s)	Manuela Montebrun (FRA)	70.69	63.36	72.04	X	68.78	70.34	72.04 m	
4	Florence Ezeh (FRA)	X	64.94	66.82	68.03	X	65.86	68.03 m	PB
5	Sini Pöyry (FIN)	67.47	66.73	67.05	64.13	65.76	65.85	67.47 m	
6	Ester Balassini (ITA)	64.85	66.29	67.27	X	66.86	X	67.27 m	
7	Alexandra Papageorgiou (GRE)	63.32	66.49	63.74	59.41	61.23	64.05	66.49 m	
8	Clarissa Claretti (ITA)	57.84	66.25	X	64.19	X	X	66.25 m	
9	Alla Davydova (RUS)	62.53	65.30	65.92				65.92 m	
10	Susanne Keil (GER)	63.85	63.61	65.20				65.20 m	
11	Andrea Bunjes (GER)	64.92	X	X				64.92 m	
12	Evdokia Tsamoglou (GRE)	64.19	61.81	64.16				64.19 m	

== See also ==
- 2000 Women's Olympic Hammer Throw (Sydney)
- 2001 Women's World Championships Hammer Throw (Edmonton)
- 2002 Hammer Throw Year Ranking
- 2003 Women's World Championships Hammer Throw (Paris)
- 2004 Women's Olympic Hammer Throw (Athens)
