= Stéphanie Falzon =

French hammer thrower

Personal information
- Born: 7 January 1983 (age 43)
- Height: 1.70 m (5 ft 7 in)
- Weight: 68 kg (150 lb)

Sport
- Country: France
- Sport: Athletics
- Event: Hammer throw

Achievements and titles
- Personal bests: outdoor - 73.40 m (2008 and 2010)
Medal record
Representing France
Jeux de la Francophonie
Gold medal – first place	2005 Niamey	Hammer throw
- Updated on 31 August 2013

Stéphanie Falzon (born 7 January 1983 in Bordeaux, France) is a female hammer thrower from France.

She competed in major international competitions such as the Olympic Games, the World Championships, and the European Championships.

Her personal best is 73.40 metres, which she achieved at the French Athletics Championships on 26 July 2008 in Albi and in June 2010 in Montreuil-sous-Bois.

== Results in international competitions ==
Note: Only the position and distance in the final are indicated, unless otherwise stated. If the athlete did not qualify for the final, the overall position and distance in the qualification round are indicated.

Year	Competition	Venue	Position	Notes
Representing France
2000	World Junior Championships	Santiago, Chile	31st (q)	49.77 m
2001	European Junior Championships	Grosseto, Italy	8th	55.15 m
2002	World Junior Championships	Kingston, Jamaica	6th	58.72 m
2003	European U23 Championships	Bydgoszcz, Poland	16th (q)	59.15 m
2005	European U23 Championships	Erfurt, Germany	8th	62.76 m
2005	Jeux de la Francophonie	Niamey, Niger	1st	65.12 m
2006	European Championships	Gothenburg, Sweden	15th (q)	65.71 m
2007	World Championships	Osaka, Japan	17th	67.19 m
2008	Olympic Games	Beijing, China	14th (q)	68.93 m
2008	IAAF World Athletics Final	Stuttgart, Germany	7th	68.85 m
2009	World Championships	Berlin, Germany	9th	71.40 m
2010	European Championships	Barcelona, Spain	17th (q)	64.34 m
2011	World Championships	Daegu, South Korea	12th	66.57 m
2012	European Cup Winter Throwing	Bar, Montenegro	3rd	72.60 m
2012	European Championships	Helsinki, Finland	6th	68.03 m
2012	Olympic Games	London, United Kingdom	9th	73.06 m.
