= 2005 World Championships in Athletics – Women's hammer throw =

The Women's Hammer Throw event at the 2005 World Championships in Athletics was held at the Helsinki Olympic Stadium on August 10 and August 12. The qualification standard was set at 70.00 metres or at least the best 12 qualified for the final round.

== Medalists ==
Gold	Yipsi Moreno; Cuba (CUB)
Silver	Tatyana Lysenko; Russia (RUS)
Bronze	Manuela Montebrun; France (FRA)

== Schedule ==
- All times are Eastern European Time (UTC+2)

Qualification Round
Group A	Group B
10.08.2005 – 14:00h	10.08.2005 – 15:40h
Final Round
12.08.2005 – 19:50h

== Abbreviations ==
- All results shown are in metres

Q	automatic qualification
q	qualification by rank
DNS	did not start
NM	no mark
WR	world record
AR	area record
NR	national record
PB	personal best
SB	season best

== Records ==
Standing records prior to the 2005 World Athletics Championships
World Record	Tatyana Lysenko (RUS)	77.06 m	July 15, 2005	Moscow, Russia
Event Record	Mihaela Melinte (ROM)	75.20 m	August 24, 1999	Seville, Spain
Season Best	Tatyana Lysenko (RUS)	77.06 m	July 15, 2005	Moscow, Russia

== Qualification ==
=== Group A ===
Rank	Overall	Athlete	Attempts			Distance
Rank	Overall	Athlete	1	2	3	Distance
1	1	Yipsi Moreno (CUB)	72.67	—	—	72.67 m
2	3	Tatyana Lysenko (RUS)	71.14	—	—	71.14 m
3	4	Kamila Skolimowska (POL)	69.26	70.28	—	70.28 m
4	6	Mihaela Melinte (ROU)	67.83	68.31	66.63	68.31 m
5	7	Clarissa Claretti (ITA)	63.06	68.21	66.39	68.21 m
6	11	Zhang Wenxiu (CHN)	X	66.73	X	66.73 m
7	12	Nataliya Zolotukhina (UKR)	65.49	66.36	66.27	66.36 m
8	15	Darya Pchelnik (BLR)	X	X	65.54	65.54 m
9	16	Berta Castells (ESP)	X	63.56	65.50	65.50 m
10	20	Éva Orbán (HUN)	X	64.26	64.10	64.26 m
11	21	Sini Pöyry (FIN)	X	64.24	X	64.24 m
12	24	Bethany Hart (USA)	63.97	61.95	X	63.97 m
13	27	Cecilia Nilsson (SWE)	X	60.24	62.27	62.27 m
14	28	Betty Heidler (GER)	X	X	61.91	61.91 m
—	—	Jennifer Dahlgren (ARG)	X	X	X	NM
—	—	Yekaterina Khoroshikh (RUS)	X	X	X	NM
—	—	Kathrin Klaas (GER)	X	X	X	NM

=== Group B ===
Rank	Overall	Athlete	Attempts			Distance
Rank	Overall	Athlete	1	2	3	Distance
1	2	Manuela Montebrun (FRA)	68.64	71.63	—	71.63 m
2	5	Iryna Sekachova (UKR)	67.08	68.55	X	68.55 m
3	8	Susanne Keil (GER)	67.82	X	X	67.82 m
4	9	Erin Gilreath (USA)	67.41	63.15	65.19	67.41 m
5	10	Candice Scott (TRI)	66.85	64.99	59.70	66.85 m
6	13	Volha Tsander (BLR)	X	X	66.07	66.07 m
7	14	Ivana Brkljačić (CRO)	65.63	63.62	65.32	65.63 m
8	17	Amber Campbell (USA)	61.20	65.48	61.43	65.48 m
9	18	Stiliani Papadopoulou (GRE)	64.23	64.99	61.68	64.99 m
10	19	Jennifer Joyce (CAN)	61.88	X	64.34	64.34 m
11	20	Shirley Webb (GBR)	X	64.16	63.91	64.16 m
12	21	Eileen O'Keeffe (IRL)	X	64.09	63.71	64.09 m
13	25	Yunaika Crawford (CUB)	X	63.79	X	63.79 m
14	26	Yuka Murofushi (JPN)	56.43	62.83	X	62.83 m
15	29	Amarilys Alméstica (PUR)	56.66	X	X	56.66 m
—	—	Gu Yuan (CHN)	X	X	X	NM
—	—	Ester Balassini (ITA)	X	X	X	NM
n/a	n/a	Olga Kuzenkova (RUS)	~~X~~	~~71.97~~	—	~~71.97 m~~

== Final ==
Rank	Athlete	Attempts						Distance	Note
Rank	Athlete	1	2	3	4	5	6	Distance	Note
1st place, gold medalist(s)	Yipsi Moreno (CUB)	70.39	X	70.88	71.26	73.08	73.04	73.08 m	
2nd place, silver medalist(s)	Tatyana Lysenko (RUS)	X	70.30	68.44	68.92	72.46	71.68	72.46 m	
3rd place, bronze medalist(s)	Manuela Montebrun (FRA)	67.92	68.93	66.99	71.41	71.02	70.80	71.41 m	
4	Zhang Wenxiu (CHN)	68.16	65.90	68.31	69.82	66.68	68.53	69.82 m	
5	Iryna Sekachova (UKR)	69.65	67.26	67.59	68.62	68.08	68.15	69.65 m	
6	Kamila Skolimowska (POL)	68.96	67.14	68.76	68.34	67.01	X	68.96 m	
7	Candice Scott (TRI)	66.55	63.16	63.79	X	X	63.32	66.55 m	
8	Clarissa Claretti (ITA)	X	64.28	64.76				64.76 m	
9	Erin Gilreath (USA)	64.54	64.01	63.38				64.54 m	
10	Mihaela Melinte (ROM)	64.31	X	63.94				64.31 m	
11	Susanne Keil (GER)	X	X	63.25				63.25 m	
n/a	Olga Kuzenkova (RUS)	~~X~~	~~68.94~~	~~70.70~~	~~70.80~~	~~74.03~~	~~75.10~~	~~75.10 m~~	DQ

== See also ==
- 2005 Hammer Throw Year Ranking
