= Gulfiya Khanafeyeva =

Russian hammer thrower

Personal information
- Born: June 4, 1982 (age 44)
- Height: 1.73 m (5 ft 8 in)
- Weight: 70 kg (154 lb)

Sport
- Country: Russia
- Sport: Athletics
- Event: Hammer throw

Achievements and titles
- Personal best: 77.26 m (2006)
- Updated on 14 August 2012

Gulfiya Raifovna Khanafeyeva (Russian: Гульфия Раифовна Ханафеева, Tatar: Гөлфия Рәиф кызы Хәнәфиева, romanized: Gɵlfiə Rəif qızı Xənəfieva, born on 12 June 1982) is a Russian hammer thrower of Tatar ethnicity.

Her international breakthrough came following her world record breaking throw of 77.26 metres from 12 June 2006 in Tula. She beat fellow Russian Tatyana Lysenko, however Lysenko threw 77.41 metres on 24 June in Zhukovsky to regain the world record. Later in 2006 Khanafeyeva won a silver medal with 74.50 metres at the 2006 European Championships, her first international medal.

In 2007 Khanafeyeva improved to 77.36 m.

She participated in the 2012 Summer Olympics in London but did not qualify for the finals.

== Doping ==
In 2002 IAAF announced that Khanafeyeva had tested positive at the Russian Championships and that she had received a 3-month doping ban.

On 31 July 2008, Khanafeyeva was one of seven female Russian athletes suspended by the IAAF, due to doping test irregularities.

On 20 October 2008, it was announced that Khanafeyeva, along with 6 other Russian athletes would receive two-year doping bans for manipulating drug samples.

On 30 March 2017, she was disqualified, and her 2012 Olympics results were annulled, after her second probe came positive for banned substances. In February 2019, the Court of Arbitration for Sport handed her an eight-year ban for doping, starting from 6 January 2017.

== International competitions ==
Representing Russia
Year	Competition	Venue	Position	Event	Result	Notes
2003	European U23 Championships	Bydgoszcz, Poland	3rd	Hammer throw	66.98 m	
2003	Universiade	Daegu, South Korea	2nd	Hammer throw	65.12 m	
2006	European Championships	Gothenburg, Sweden	2nd	Hammer throw	74.50 m	
2007	World Championships	Osaka, Japan	10th	Hammer throw	69.08 m	

== See also ==
- List of doping cases in athletics
- Doping at the Olympic Games
- List of European Athletics Championships medalists (women)
- Russia at the World Athletics Championships
- Doping at the World Athletics Championships

Records
Preceded by Tatyana Lysenko	Women's Hammer World Record Holder; 12 June 2006 – 24 June 2006	Succeeded by Tatyana Lysenko
