= Maryia Smaliachkova =

Belarusian hammer thrower

Personal information
- Born: Mariya Viktorovna Smolyachkova; February 10, 1985 (age 41) Minsk, Belarus
- Height: 1.77 m (5 ft 10 in)

Sport
- Country: Belarus
- Sport: Track and field
- Event: Hammer throw

Achievements and titles
- Personal best: 74.65 m

Maryia Viktorovna Smolyachkova (Belarusian: Марыя Віктараўна Смалячкова; born 10 February 1985 in Minsk) is a female hammer thrower from Belarus. Her personal best throw is 74.65 metres, achieved in July 2008 in Minsk.

== Achievements ==
Year	Competition	Venue	Position	Notes
Representing Belarus
2001	World Youth Championships	Debrecen, Hungary	3rd	59.16 m
2002	World Junior Championships	Kingston, Jamaica	10th	53.37 m
2003	Universiade	Daegu, South Korea	7th	61.48 m
2003	European Junior Championships	Tampere, Finland	2nd	65.89 m
2004	World Junior Championships	Grosseto, Italy	1st	66.81 m
2004	Olympic Games	Athens, Greece	25th (q)	65.68 m
2005	European U23 Championships	Erfurt, Germany	6th	66.16 m
2006	European Championships	Gothenburg, Sweden	4th	71.87 m
2006	World Cup	Athens, Greece	5th	68.93 m
2007	European U23 Championships	Debrecen, Hungary	1st	69.34 m
2007	Universiade	Bangkok, Thailand	7th	64.53 m
2008	Olympic Games	Beijing, PR China	13th (q)	69.22 m
2009	Universiade	Belgrade, Serbia	12th	65.08 m
