= Susanne Keil =

German hammer thrower

Personal information
- Born: 18 May 1978 (age 48) Frankfurt, West Germany

Sport
- Sport: Track and field
Medal record
Representing Germany
European Junior Championships
Bronze medal – third place	1997 Ljubljana	Hammer throw

Susanne Keil (born 18 May 1978) is a female hammer thrower from Germany. Her personal best throw is 72.74 metres, achieved in July 2005 in Nikiti. This ranks her third among German hammer throwers, behind Betty Heidler and Kathrin Klaas. A member of LG Eintracht Frankfurt Keil is a two-time national champion in the women's hammer throw (2002 and 2003)

== Achievements ==
Year	Competition	Venue	Position	Notes
Representing Germany
1997	European Junior Championships	Ljubljana, Slovenia	3rd	59.22 m
1999	Universiade	Palma de Mallorca, Spain	7th	62.10 m
1999	European U23 Championships	Gothenburg, Sweden	9th	56.52 m
2001	World Championships	Edmonton, Canada	14th (q)	64.06 m
2001	Universiade	Beijing, China	6th	64.38 m
2002	European Championships	Munich, Germany	10th	65.20 m
2002	World Cup	Madrid, Spain	6th	64.62 m
2003	World Championships	Paris, France	5th	69.43 m
2003	World Athletics Final	Szombathely, Hungary	5th	67.78 m
2004	Olympic Games	Athens, Greece	21st (q)	66.35 m
2005	World Championships	Helsinki, Finland	12th	63.25 m
2005	Universiade	İzmir, Turkey	7th	67.50 m
2006	European Championships	Gothenburg, Sweden	13th (q)	66.45 m
2007	World Championships	Osaka, Japan	—	NM
