= Sini Latvala =

Finnish hammer thrower

Personal information
- Full name: Sini Tuuli Susanne Latvala (née Pöyry)
- Nickname: "Sintsa"
- Nationality: Finland
- Born: February 3, 1980 (age 46) Kankaanpää, Finland

Sport
- Sport: Athletics
- Event: Hammer throw

Achievements and titles
- Personal best(s): Hammer throw — 69.16 m (Kaustinen, July 2004)

Sini Tuuli Susanne Latvala (née Pöyry, born 3 February 1980 in Kankaanpää) is a retired female hammer thrower from Finland. Her personal best throw is 69.16 metres, achieved in July 2004 in Kaustinen. She was nicknamed "Sintsa".

== Achievements ==
Year	Competition	Venue	Position	Notes
Representing Finland
1998	World Junior Championships	Annecy, France	2nd	61.76 m
1998	European Championships	Budapest, Hungary	15th	58.61 m
2000	Olympic Games	Sydney, Australia	12th	62.49 m
2001	European U23 Championships	Amsterdam, Netherlands	2nd	64.71 m
2001	World Championships	Edmonton, Canada	16th	63.76 m
2002	European Championships	Munich, Germany	5th	67.47 m
2003	World Championships	Paris, France	14th	65.01 m
2004	Olympic Games	Athens, Greece	23rd	66.05 m
2005	World Championships	Helsinki, Finland	22nd	64.24 m
2006	European Championships	Gothenburg, Sweden	14th	65.72 m
