= Yekaterina Khoroshikh =

Russian hammer thrower

Yekaterina Khoroshikh (Russian: Екатерина Хороших; born 21 January 1983 in Rostov Oblast) is a female hammer thrower from Russia. Her personal best is 76.63 metres, achieved in June 2006 in Zhukovsky.

== Doping ban ==
Khoroshikh tested positive for 6α-methylandrostendione in May 2007 and was subsequently handed a two-year ban from sports

== Achievements ==
Year	Competition	Venue	Position	Notes
Representing Russia
2002	World Junior Championships	Kingston, Jamaica	11th	53.22 m
2005	European U23 Championships	Erfurt, Germany	1st	71.51 m
2005	World Championships	Helsinki, Finland	—	NM
2006	European Championships	Gothenburg, Sweden	22nd	62.97 m

== See also ==
- List of sportspeople sanctioned for doping offences
