= Bethany Hart =

American hammer thrower (born 1977)

Bethany Hart (born April 10, 1977) is an American retired hammer thrower.

Hart competed for the UConn Huskies track and field team in the NCAA.

She competed at the 2005 World Championships without reaching the final.

Her personal best throw was 69.89 metres, achieved in June 2008 in West Point.
