= Berta Castells =

Spanish hammer thrower (born 1984)

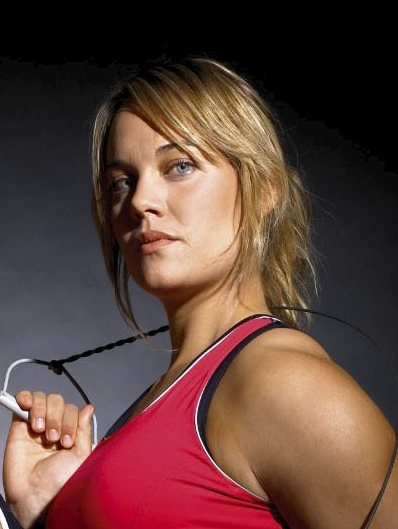
- Berta Castells in 2006

Personal information
- Full name: Berta Castells Franco
- Born: 24 January 1984 (age 42) Torredembarra, Spain
- Height: 1.74 m (5 ft 9 in)
- Weight: 78 kg (172 lb)

Sport
- Country: Spain
- Sport: Athletics
- Event: Hammer throw
- Club: Valencia Esports
- Coached by: José Luis Velasco
Medal record
Women's Athletics
Representing Spain
Mediterranean Games
Silver medal – second place	Mersin 2013	Hammer throw
- Updated on 21 January 2013

Berta Castells Franco (born 24 January 1984) is a Spanish female hammer thrower. Her personal best throw is 70.52 metres, achieved in 2016 in Manresa (Spain).

== Achievements ==
Year	Competition	Venue	Position	Notes
Representing Spain
2001	World Youth Championships	Debrecen, Hungary	2nd	59.65 m
2001	European Junior Championships	Grosseto, Italy	3rd	59.98 m
2001	Mediterranean Games	Radès, Tunisia	6th	60.10 m
2002	World Junior Championships	Kingston, Jamaica	9th	55.41 m
2002	European Championships	Munich, Germany	35th (q)	57.15 m
2002	World Cup	Madrid, Spain	8th	63.49 m
2003	European Junior Championships	Tampere, Finland	3rd	65.04 m
2003	World Championships	Paris, France	37th (q)	58.13 m
2004	Ibero-American Championships	Huelva, Spain	2nd	64.96 m
2004	Olympic Games	Athens, Greece	22nd (q)	66.05 m
2005	Mediterranean Games	Almería, Spain	5th	66.02 m
2005	European U23 Championships	Erfurt, Germany	8th (q)	64.50 m
2005	World Championships	Helsinki, Finland	17th (q)	65.50 m
2005	Universiade	İzmir, Turkey	9th	63.89 m
2006	European Championships	Gothenburg, Sweden	37th (q)	58.93 m
2007	World Championships	Osaka, Japan	30th (q)	63.32 m
2008	Olympic Games	Beijing, China	41st (q)	62.44 m
2009	Mediterranean Games	Pescara, Italy	4th	66.73 m
2009	World Championships	Berlin, Germany	22nd (q)	67.32 m
2010	Ibero-American Championships	San Fernando, Spain	2nd	68.37 m
2010	European Championships	Barcelona, Spain	9th	68.20 m
2011	World Championships	Daegu, South Korea	18th (q)	67.74 m
2012	European Championships	Helsinki, Finland	9th	67.42 m
2012	Olympic Games	London, United Kingdom	21st (q)	68.41 m
2013	Mediterranean Games	Mersin, Turkey	2nd	66.16 m
2014	European Championships	Zurich, Switzerland	–	NM
2016	European Championships	Amsterdam, Netherlands	12th	63.27 m
2017	World Championships	London, United Kingdom	22nd (q)	66.11 m
2018	Mediterranean Games	Tarragona, Spain	4th	67.53 m
2018	Ibero-American Championships	Trujillo, Peru	3rd	66.68 m
