= Mona Holm =

Norwegian hammer thrower

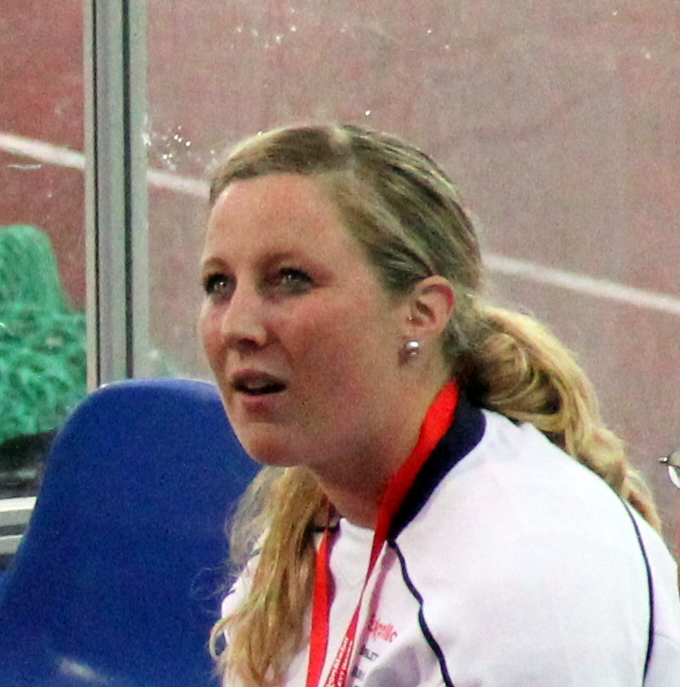
- Mona Holm in 2011

Personal information
- Full name: Mona Christine Holm
- Born: August 15, 1983 (age 42)
- Home town: Kolvereid, Norway
- Height: 1.69 m (5 ft 7 in)

Sport
- Country: Norway
- Event: Hammer throw
- Club: Kolvereid IL; IL Norna-Salhus; IK Tjalve
- Coached by: Einar Brynemo
- Retired: 2016

Achievements and titles
- National finals: 9 titles
- Personal best: 70.43 m

Mona Christine Holm, formerly married Solberg (born 5 August 1983) is a Norwegian hammer thrower.

== Career ==
=== Early career ===
She grew up in Kolvereid. As a young girl she tried football, handball, badminton, cross-country skiing, cross-country running and the discus throw. She was discovered during a discus meetup in Oslo and advised to try the hammer throw. Lacking a training field, she used to stand on a remote road and throw the hammer into the adjacent woodlands. She attended upper secondary school in Namsos, but still without a group of throwers to train with, so she continued playing handball throughout her teenages. She later took higher education as a physiotherapist.

In the international age-specific competitions, she competed at the 2001 European Junior Championships, the 2002 World Junior Championships, the 2003 European U23 Championships and the 2005 European U23 Championships without reaching the final.

=== International career and national titles ===
Her stint in senior international competitions started at the 2006 European Championships, continuing with the 2007 World Championships, the 2010 European Championships, the 2011 World Championships and the 2012 European Championships. She reached the final on neither occasion. She tried qualifying for the 2012 Olympic Games, but was not given the green light by the Norwegian Athletics Association. She announced that this was the probable end of her elite career.

Mona Holm won her first national medal in the hammer throw in 2002, when she took the silver. She proceeded to become Norwegian champion 9 times, every year in a row from 2004 throughout 2012. She won the King's Cup, the award for the best female result at the national championships, in 2007 and 2011. During her heyday, she represented the clubs IL Norna-Salhus and IK Tjalve. As the undisputed best hammer thrower for a decade, she represented Norway in several European Cups and European Team Championships, as well as European Winter Throwing Cups.

Her main coach was Einar Brynemo. During her career, she also managed to win the bronze medal in discus throw at two Norwegian championships; in 2004 and 2010. After sitting out the 2013 Norwegian championships due to childbirth, Mona Holm Solberg tried to win her tenth hammer title in 2014, but succumbed to Trude Raad. Holm Solberg took her last hammer medal at the nationals, another silver medal to bring her silver count to four, in 2016.

=== Records ===
Holm broke the Norwegian record in the hammer throw a total of ten times. The record stood at a modest 60.56 metres when Holm threw 60.84 in May 2004 in Szombathely. Three weeks later, she improved to 60.92 metres at the 2004 European Cup Second League Group A meet in Reykjavík. In 2005, the record took a leap to 62.19 metres in Gävle, at the 2005 European Cup First League Group A competition, before Holm reached 62.82 metres at the Norwegian championships at Fana stadion.

Another improvement to 64.20 metres, set in April 2006 while conducting pre-season training in Poros, was not acknowledged as the stadium was "not certified". Instead, she went via 63.39 metres at another European Cup meet—the 2006 European Cup Second League Group A in Banská Bystrica—before even surpassing her unofficial record with back-to-back throws of 64.50 metres at the Öresundsspelen in Helsingborg and 64.89 at the Bottnaryd Throwing Meeting in Bottnaryd, both in Sweden. She also came close at the national championships at Bislett stadion, where she threw 64.68 metres.

2007 would see her largest record improvement so far. At the Hallescher Werfertage in May 2007 she broke the record twice, first with 66.66 metres (as an ancillary record) and finally with 67.80 metres. This would stand for three years, until an elite meeting in Tønsberg in June 2010, when she surpassed it with 67.96 metres. This too would stand for some time, until August 2011 when Holm reached her final best throw of 70.43 at the Norwegian championships in Byrkjelo. This was also the Nordic record at the time. Her Norwegian record stood until 2019 when overtaken by Beatrice Nedberge Llano.

== Personal life ==
She married Paul Solberg, a former javelin thrower and now coach, in Prestebakke in April 2012. The couple settled in his hometown Halden. She later moved to Fredrikstad and worked at the sport school Wang Ung.
