= Jennifer Dahlgren =

Argentine hammer thrower (born 1984)

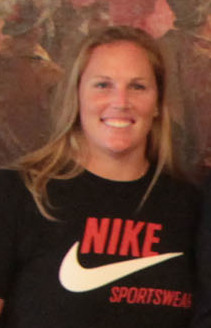
- Jennifer Dahlgren in 2012

Personal information
- Full name: Jennifer Dahlgren Fitzner
- Nationality: Argentina
- Born: 21 April 1984 (age 42) Buenos Aires, Argentina
- Height: 1.82 m (6 ft 0 in)
- Weight: 112 kg (247 lb)

Sport
- Sport: Athletics
- Event: Hammer throw
- College team: University of Georgia
Medal record
Women's athletics
Representing Argentina
Pan American Games
Bronze medal – third place	2007 Rio de Janeiro	Hammer throw
South American Championships
Gold medal – first place	2005 Cali	Hammer throw
Gold medal – first place	2006 Tunja	Hammer throw
Gold medal – first place	2011 Buenos Aires	Hammer throw
Bronze medal – third place	2009 Lima	Hammer throw
Bronze medal – third place	2013 Cartagenas	Hammer throw
Pan American Junior Championships
Gold medal – first place	2003 Bridgetown	Hammer throw
Bronze medal – third place	2003 Bridgetown	Shot put
South American Youth Championships
Gold medal – first place	2000 Bogotá	Hammer throw
Silver medal – second place	2000 Bogotá	Discus throw
- Updated on 28 January 2015

Jennifer Dahlgren Fitzner (born 21 April 1984) is a retired Argentine hammer thrower. Having spent much of her life in the United States, she competed as an amateur for the University of Georgia. She set the US collegiate hammer record and was the NCAA Outdoor champion in both 2006 and 2007. She is a three-time gold medallist at the South American Championships and won the bronze medal at the 2007 Pan American Games.

Dahlgren has represented Argentina at the 2004 and 2008 Summer Olympics, as well as competed at the World Championships in Athletics on three occasions. She first broke the South American record in the discipline in 2004 and has raised it several metres to her current best of 73.74 m. She is one of the continent's top performers in the event, in which South American athletes are historically weak. In 2010 she won the Konex Award Merit Diploma as one of the five best athletes from the last decade in Argentina.

== Career ==
Dahlgren's first major tournament was the 2000 World Junior Championships in Athletics, but she did not make the final, finishing 11th in the qualifying stages. She finished fourth at the 2001 World Youth Championships, but won the South American Junior Championships and placed second at the Pan American Junior Championships that year. Dahlgren placed fifth at the World Junior Championships in Athletics the following year and again topped the podium in the 2002 South American Junior Championships in Athletics. The 2003 season proved to be a breakthrough year: she set the South American junior record in the discipline and won at the Pan American Junior Championships.

Dahlgren reached the championship podium three times in 2004, finishing third at the NCAA Women's Outdoor Track and Field Championship for the University of Georgia with a South American record of 66.12 m, taking the gold at the South American U23 Championships in Athletics and winning a bronze medal at the 2004 Ibero-American Championships. However, she did not fare as well at the 2004 Summer Olympics, managing a throw of only 59.52 m. In 2005, she improved her record to 67.07 m and bettered her previous performance at the NCAA Championships with a second-place finish. She set a championship record of 65.05 m to win the 2005 South American Championships in Athletics – her first senior title. She did not continue her momentum into the 2005 World Championships in Athletics and threw three fouls to be eliminated in the qualifying round.

In 2006, she won the NCAA Indoor Weight throw title and set a new US collegiate record in the hammer with a throw of 71.78 m at the SEC Championships – the fourth time she had improved her South American record that year. She went on to win her first outdoor NCAA hammer throw title a few months later. Dahlgren improved her championship record to 69.07 m to take a second continental gold at the 2006 South American Championships in Athletics. She also won at the 2006 South American Games, which acted as the South American Under-23 Athletics Championships that year.

She started 2007 by winning the NCAA championships with a mark of 70.72 m (her final amateur title) and throwing a new South American record of 72.01 m soon afterwards in Greensboro, North Carolina. She scored her first major championship medal at the 2007 Pan American Games, taking the bronze with a throw of 68.37 m behind Cubans Yipsi Moreno and Arasay Thondike. Representing Argentina at the 2007 World Championships in Athletics, she threw 65.64 m in the qualifying round but this was not enough to progress to the final.

She suffered a foot injury in 2008, which affected her performances early in the season. She recovered somewhat in time for the 2008 Ibero-American Championships and was the silver medallist behind Rosa Rodríguez. She had a best mark of 66.35 m at the 2008 Summer Olympics, leaving her as the best South American performer but in 29th place overall. She had a below par performance at the 2009 South American Championships in Athletics, throwing 63.81 m for the bronze medal. Despite this, she was also the best South American performer in the hammer at the 2009 World Championships in Athletics, where her throw of 68.90 m was good enough for 17th, but not enough to make the final round.

She came under the tutelage of fellow Argentine Marcelo Pugliese, a former Olympic hammer thrower. At the start of the 2010 season, Dahlgren set another best of 73.74 m in Buenos Aires.

== Personal life ==
Dahlgren frequently moved with her family in her youth, which meant that she spent much time living in the United States. She returned to Argentina at the age of 13, but took time to feel comfortable with the language and settle into her school. However, after settling she was once again uprooted as her family moved to Texas. Her mother Irene Fitzner competed for Argentina as a sprint athlete at the 1972 Summer Olympics. Dahlgren's younger brother, Paul, attended Baylor University in Waco, Texas.

Dahlgren's great-grandfather was Swedish, hence her Swedish surname.

Dahlgren married on 11 May 2024 in Houston, TX.

== Personal bests ==
Event	Best (m)	Venue	Date
Shot put (indoor)	15.54	Blacksburg, Virginia, United States	14 February 2004
20 lb weight throw (indoor)	24.04	Fayetteville, Arkansas, United States	10 March 2006
Hammer throw	73.74	Buenos Aires, Argentina	10 April 2010

- All information taken from IAAF profile.

== Achievements ==
Year	Competition	Venue	Position	Event	Notes
Representing Argentina
1999	South American Junior Championships	Concepción, Chile	8th	Shot put	10.79 m
1999	South American Junior Championships	Concepción, Chile	7th	Discus throw	37.46 m
1999	South American Junior Championships	Concepción, Chile	5th	Hammer throw	46.36 m
2000	South American Junior Championships	São Leopoldo, Brazil	6th	Discus throw	39.09 m
2000	South American Junior Championships	São Leopoldo, Brazil	1st	Hammer throw	54.95 m
2000	World Junior Championships	Santiago, Chile	23rd (q)	Hammer throw	50.49 m
2000	South American Youth Championships	Bogotá, Colombia	2nd	Discus throw	39.55 m A
2000	South American Youth Championships	Bogotá, Colombia	1st	Hammer throw	56.68 m A
2001	World Youth Championships	Debrecen, Hungary	4th	Hammer throw	56.96 m
2001	South American Junior Championships	Santa Fe, Argentina	6th	Shot put	12.47 m
2001	South American Junior Championships	Santa Fe, Argentina	1st	Hammer throw	57.50 m
2001	Pan American Junior Championships	Santa Fe, Argentina	2nd	Hammer throw	57.18 m
2002	World Junior Championships	Kingston, Jamaica	5th	Hammer throw	59.48 m (AJR)
2002	South American Junior Championships / South American Games	Belém, Brazil	2nd	Shot put	13.61 m
2002	South American Junior Championships / South American Games	Belém, Brazil	2nd	Discus throw	41.41 m
2002	South American Junior Championships / South American Games	Belém, Brazil	1st	Hammer throw	55.73 m
2003	Pan American Junior Championships	Bridgetown, Barbados	3rd	Shot put	14.26 m
2003	Pan American Junior Championships	Bridgetown, Barbados	1st	Hammer throw	58.61 m
2004	South American U23 Championships	Barquisimeto, Venezuela	3rd	Shot put	14.34 m
2004	South American U23 Championships	Barquisimeto, Venezuela	6th	Discus	42.62 m
2004	South American U23 Championships	Barquisimeto, Venezuela	1st	Hammer	65.17 m
2004	Ibero-American Championships	Huelva, Spain	3rd	Hammer throw	63.72 m
2004	Olympic Games	Athens, Greece	43rd (q)	Hammer throw	59.52 m
2005	South American Championships	Cali, Colombia	1st	Hammer throw	65.05 m
2005	World Championships	Helsinki, Finland	—	Hammer throw	NM
2006	South American Championships	Tunja, Colombia	1st	Hammer throw	69.07 m (CR)
2006	South American U23 Championships / South American Games	Buenos Aires, Argentina	1st	Hammer throw	66.48 m
2007	Pan American Games	Rio de Janeiro, Brazil	3rd	Hammer throw	68.37 m
2007	World Championships	Osaka, Japan	25th (q)	Hammer throw	65.64 m
2008	Ibero-American Championships	Iquique, Chile	2nd	Hammer throw	64.89 m
2008	Olympic Games	Beijing, China	29th (q)	Hammer throw	66.35 m
2009	South American Championships	Lima, Peru	3rd	Hammer throw	63.81 m
2009	World Championships	Berlin, Germany	17th (q)	Hammer throw	68.90 m
2010	Ibero-American Championships	San Fernando, Spain	1st	Hammer throw	70.91 m
2010	Continental Cup	Split, Croatia	5th	Hammer throw	66.25 m
2011	South American Championships	Buenos Aires, Argentina	1st	Hammer throw	72.70 m
2011	World Championships	Daegu, South Korea	9th	Hammer throw	69.72 m
2011	Pan American Games	Guadalajara, Mexico	6th	Hammer throw	67.11 m
2012	Ibero-American Championships	Barquisimeto, Venezuela	2nd	Hammer throw	71.23 m
2012	Olympic Games	London, United Kingdom	–	Hammer throw	NM
2013	South American Championships	Cartagena, Colombia	3rd	Hammer throw	65.82 m
2013	World Championships	Moscow, Russia	17th (q)	Hammer throw	68.90 m
2014	South American Games	Santiago, Chile	2nd	Hammer throw	67.94 m
2014	Ibero-American Championships	São Paulo, Brazil	1st	Hammer throw	66.84 m
2014	Pan American Sports Festival	Mexico City, Mexico	6th	Hammer throw	68.37m A
2015	South American Championships	Lima, Peru	3rd	Hammer throw	64.76 m
2015	Pan American Games	Toronto, Canada	7th	Hammer throw	65.33 m
2015	World Championships	Beijing, China	21st (q)	Hammer throw	67.68 m
2016	Ibero-American Championships	Rio de Janeiro, Brazil	1st	Hammer throw	67.34 m
2016	Olympic Games	Rio de Janeiro, Brazil	27th (q)	Hammer throw	63.03 m
2017	South American Championships	Asunción, Paraguay	2nd	Hammer throw	64.76 m
2017	World Championships	London, United Kingdom	–	Hammer throw	NM
2018	South American Games	Cochabamba, Bolivia	1st	Hammer throw	70.98 m
2018	Ibero-American Championships	Trujillo, Peru	1st	Hammer throw	68.89 m
2019	South American Championships	Lima, Peru	3rd	Hammer throw	65.06 m
2019	Pan American Games	Lima, Peru	10th	Hammer throw	63.22 m
