= Yunaika Crawford =

Cuban hammer thrower (born 1982)

Personal information
- Full name: Yunaika Crawford Rogert
- Born: November 2, 1982 (age 43) Marianao, Havana, Cuba
- Height: 1.64 m (5 ft 5 in)
- Weight: 78 kg (172 lb)

Sport
- Country: Cuba
- Sport: Athletics
Medal record
Women's Athletics
Representing Cuba
Olympic Games
Bronze medal – third place	2004 Athens	Hammer
Pan American Games
Silver medal – second place	2003 Santo Domingo	Hammer
- Updated on 27 June 2013

Yunaika Crawford Rogert (Spanish pronunciation: [ʝuˈnajka ˈkɾofoɾ(ð)]; born November 2, 1982) is a Cuban hammer thrower who won the Olympic bronze medal in 2004 with a personal best throw of 73.16 metres.

== Early career ==
Crawford made an early debut on the international stage. At the age of sixteen, she competed at the 1998 World Junior Championships, finishing ninth. She had set a season's best throw of 57.03 metres in the qualifying round. The next year she won the silver medal at the inaugural World Youth Championships, for athletes aged seventeen and less. She threw 57.56 metres to win that medal, but had managed a personal best of 62.71 metres in Havana in March. One year after that, in March 2000, she improved to 65.88 metres in Las Tunas. The 2000 World Junior Championships were staged in Santiago de Chile, with Crawford winning the bronze medal. It was the second championships that included the women's hammer throw.

In her last season as a junior, Crawford won the Pan American Junior Championships. She did so in a new championship record of 63.20 metres, and her season's best was 65.67 m, from Santiago de Cuba in July. She also won the 2001 Central American and Caribbean Championships, again in a championship record, this time 58.68 metres.

== Senior career ==
In 2002 Crawford broke the 70-metre barrier for the first time, with 70.62 metres achieved during a meet in Madrid in July. She improved slightly the next year, with 70.69 from Havana in May. She won the silver medal at the 2003 Pan American Games, behind countryfellow Yipsi Moreno. She also competed at the 2003 World Championships, but with a 64.59 throw in the qualifying round, she did not reach the top twelve, who progressed to the final.

In 2004, Crawford beat her 2003 best result several times. Having started the season with a couple of competitions in the 60-metre range, she launched a 71.62 metre throw in Havana in March. She then dropped below 70 metres in the next competition, before returning with a 70.44 m throw in Seville, 71.75 in Guadalajara, 71.40 in Padua and 70.33 in Kazan. Entering the Olympic Games, she threw 71.74 metres in the qualifying round and progressed safely to the final. Here, she reached new levels to throw a career best of 73.16 metres. This was enough to win the Olympic bronze medal. Ahead of her on the podium were Russian Olga Kuzenkova, who had started with a 73.18 metre throw and been leading throughout the competition, and pre-event favourite Yipsi Moreno who had to settle for silver.

In 2005, she only managed a season's best of 69.30 metres, from Havana in March. She competed at the 2005 World Championships, but fell through in the qualification round. With only 63.79 metres she was far from securing a place in the final round. She did however win the silver medal at the 2005 Central American and Caribbean Championships, this time behind Trinidadian Candice Scott. The next year her season's best throw was 71.92 metres. However, no major events were staged this year, except for the 2006 Central American and Caribbean Games, where she won another silver medal behind Yipsi Moreno.

In 2007, she managed to reach an international final again, at the 2007 World Championships, but in the final round she finished twelfth and last following two throws in the 67-metre range. She then competed at the 2008 Olympic Games, but did not reach the final round and finishing with a 31st place.

== Personal best ==
- Hammer throw: 73.16 m – (China) Beijing, 25 August 2004

== Achievements ==
Year	Competition	Venue	Position	Event	Notes
Representing Cuba
1998	Ibero-American Championships	Lisbon, Portugal	5th	Hammer throw	55.80 m
1998	World Junior Championships	Annecy, France	9th	Hammer throw	56.01 m
1999	World Youth Championships	Bydgoszcz, Poland	2nd	Hammer throw	57.56 m
2000	World Junior Championships	Santiago, Chile	3rd	Hammer throw	59.98 m
2001	Central American and Caribbean Championships	Guatemala City, Guatemala	1st	Hammer throw	58.68 m A
2001	Pan American Junior Championships	Santa Fe, Argentina	1st	Hammer throw	63.20 m
2003	Pan American Games	Santo Domingo, Dominican Republic	2nd	Hammer throw	69.57 m
2003	World Championships	Saint-Denis, France	9th (q)	Hammer throw	64.59 m
2004	Ibero-American Championships	Huelva, Spain	2nd	Hammer throw	70.28 m
2004	Olympic Games	Athens, Greece	3rd	Hammer throw	73.16 m
2005	Central American and Caribbean Championships	Nassau, Bahamas	2nd	Hammer throw	66.75 m
2005	World Championships	Helsinki, Finland	13th (q)	Hammer throw	63.79 m
2006	Central American Games	Cartagena, Colombia	2nd	Hammer throw	67.88 m
2007	World Championships	Osaka, Japan	11th	Hammer throw	67.56 m
2008	Central American and Caribbean Championships	Cali, Colombia	2nd	Hammer throw	69.03 m A
2008	Olympic Games	Beijing, China	31st (q)	Hammer throw	66.16 m
2009	ALBA Games	Havana, Cuba	1st	Hammer throw	70.66 m
2012	Ibero-American Championships	Barquisimeto, Venezuela	4th	Hammer throw	66.25 m
