= Yelena Rigert =

Russian hammer thrower

Yelena Aleksandrovna Rigert (née Priyma Russian: Прийма; Russian: Елена Александровна Ригерт; born 2 December 1983) is a female hammer thrower from Russia. She was born in Rostov-na-Donu, Rostov Oblast. Her personal best throw is 75.09 m (246 ft 4 1/4 in), achieved in Moscow in May 2013. This ranks her in the all-time top 25 for the event. She represented her country at the 2008 Summer Olympics and the 2007 World Championships in Athletics.

== International competitions ==
Year	Competition	Venue	Position	Notes
Representing Russia
2005	European U23 Championships	Erfurt, Germany	9th	60.95 m
2007	World Championships	Osaka, Japan	19th	66.84 m
2008	Olympic Games	Beijing, PR China	10th	69.72 m
