= Noémi Németh =

Hungarian hammer thrower (born 1986)

Noémi Németh (born 7 April 1986) is a Hungarian hammer thrower.

She finished ninth at the 2005 World Athletics Final.

Her personal best throw is 64.09 metres, achieved in June 2005 in Szombathely.

== See also ==
- List of hammer throwers
