= Erin Gilreath =

American hammer thrower (born 1980)

Personal information
- Nationality: United States
- Born: August 11, 1980 (age 45) Gainesville, Florida
- Height: 5 ft 9 in (1.75 m)
- Weight: 203 lb (92 kg)

Sport
- Sport: Track and field
- Event: Hammer throw
- College team: University of Florida
- Club: New York Athletic Club

Erin Gilreath (born August 11, 1980) is an American hammer thrower.

Her personal best is 73.87 meters, achieved in June 2005 in Carson, California. She attended the University of Florida.

== International competitions ==
Year	Competition	Venue	Position	Notes
2004	Olympic Games	Athens, Greece	20th	66.71 m
2004	World Athletics Final	Szombathely, Hungary	8th	
2005	World Championships	Helsinki, Finland	10th	64.54 m
2006	World Athletics Final	Stuttgart, Germany	8th	
2006	World Cup	Athens, Greece	6th	67.39 m
2009	World Championships	Berlin, Germany	25th	66.72 m

== See also ==
- Florida Gators
- List of University of Florida Olympians
