= Keelin Godsey =

Transgender athlete

Personal information
- Born: 2 January 1984 (age 41) Massachusetts, United States

Sport
- Sport: Track and field
- Club: Bates Bobcats

Keelin Godsey (born Kelly Godsey, January 2, 1984) was the first openly transgender athlete to compete for a spot on the United States Olympic team. Godsey was assigned female at birth, has openly identified as male (they/he) since 2005, and competed in women's hammer throw competitions.

== Early life and education ==
Godsey graduated in 2006 with a bachelor's degree in English from Bates College.

== Women's hammer throw ==
=== Collegiate competition ===
Godsey won two national collegiate championships in the women's hammer throw. They set the NCAA Division III record in the hammer throw twice (in 2005 and 2006), a record which they still held as of May 2015. They earned All-America status in four different throwing disciplines: shot put, weight throw, discus throw, and hammer throw. They were named USTFCCCA New England Region track and field athlete of the year twice, and was named to the NCAA Silver Anniversary Division III track and field championship team.

=== U.S. Olympic trials and international competition ===
At the 2008 U.S. Olympic trials for the 2008 summer Olympics, Godsey finished in eighth place in the hammer throw.

In 2011, Godsey finished third at the USATF national championships, earning a spot on the U.S. team at the 2011 Pan Am Games, where they finished fifth in the hammer throw.

At the U.S. Olympic trials for the London 2012 summer Olympics, Godsey placed fifth in the women's hammer throw competition at Nike headquarters in Beaverton, Oregon, with a mark of 70.48 metres (231 ft 3 in), missing a spot on the three-member U.S. team by 0.29 metres (11 in).

== Hammer throw season bests ==
Year	Performance	Place	Date
2012	70.48	Beaverton, Oregon	21 June
2011	68.90	Eugene, Oregon	25 June
2010	64.20	Cambridge, Massachusetts	21 May
2009	66.99	Tucson, Arizona	23 May
2008	66.22	Eugene, Oregon	3 July
2007	64.64	Cambridge, Massachusetts	13 July
2006	62.92	Lisle, Illinois	26 May
2005	62.82	Jersey City, New Jersey	20 May
2004	60.41	Springfield, Massachusetts	1 May
