= Laura Gibilisco =

Italian hammer thrower

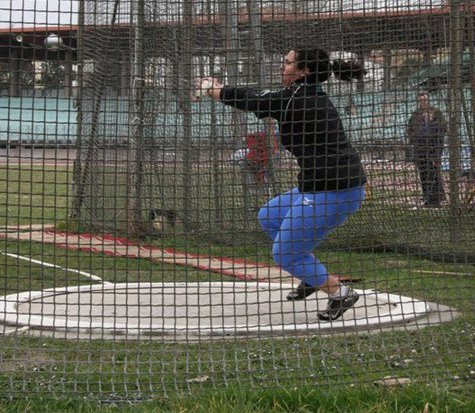

Personal information
- Nationality: Italian
- Born: January 17, 1986 (age 40) Syracuse, Italy
- Height: 1.63 m (5 ft 4 in)
- Weight: 85 kg (187 lb)

Sport
- Country: Italy
- Sport: Athletics
- Event: Hammer throw
- Club: G.S. Fiamme Azzurre

Achievements and titles
- Personal best: Hammer throw: 66.90 m (2008)
Medal record
World Junior Championships
Bronze medal – third place	2004 Grosseto	Hammer throw
European Junior Championships
Bronze medal – third place	2005 Kaunas	Hammer throw

Laura Gibilisco (born 17 January 1986 in Syracuse) is an Italian hammer thrower.

== Biography ==
Her personal best throw is 66.90 metres, achieved in April 2008 in Syracuse. She is not related to the Italian pole vaulter Giuseppe Gibilisco.

== Achievements ==
Year	Competition	Venue	Position	Event	Notes
Representing Italy
2004	World Junior Championships	Grosseto, Italy	3rd	Hammer throw	60.95 m
2005	European Junior Championships	Kaunas, Lithuania	3rd	Hammer throw	62.58 m
2007	European U23 Championships	Debrecen, Hungary	8th	Hammer throw	63.19 m
