= Athletics at the 2003 Summer Universiade – Women's hammer throw =

The women's hammer throw event at the 2003 Summer Universiade was held on 26 August in Daegu, South Korea.

== Results ==
Rank	Athlete	Nationality	#1	#2	#3	#4	#5	#6	Result	Notes
1st place, gold medalist(s)	Liu Yinghui	China	60.79	66.00	67.94	67.15	69.05	68.21	69.05	
2nd place, silver medalist(s)	Gulfiya Khanafeyeva	Russia	62.06	65.12	64.34	63.95	64.13	64.63	65.12	
3rd place, bronze medalist(s)	Agnieszka Pogroszewska	Poland	63.57	x	62.46	63.34	63.09	64.27	64.27	
4	Eileen O'Keeffe	Ireland	60.60	59.75	62.96	x	x	60.74	62.96	
5	Tatyana Lysenko	Russia	62.04	60.82	60.55	59.06	58.58	60.78	62.04	
6	Maria José Conde	Portugal	57.55	58.35	60.30	61.10	59.87	61.74	61.74	
7	Maryia Smaliachkova	Belarus	x	61.48	x	58.96	57.93	61.02	61.48	
8	Shirley Webb	Great Britain	56.81	59.60	61.07	60.78	x	59.77	61.07	
9	Julianna Tudja	Hungary	x	57.55	x				57.55	
10	Jéssica Ponce de Leon	Mexico	52.85	54.45	x				54.45	
11	Amarilys Alméstica	Puerto Rico	x	x	53.58				53.58	
12	Jang Pok-Sim	South Korea	x	x	53.29				53.29	
13	Huang Chih-Feng	Chinese Taipei	x	52.02	52.80				52.80	
14	Violeta Guzmán	Mexico	x	x	52.70				52.70	
15	Hayat El Ghazi	Morocco	x	x	52.57				52.57	
16	Carol Stevenson	Canada	52.25	49.98	49.27				52.25	
17	Zübeyde Yıldız	Turkey	50.42	51.90	51.68				51.90	
18	Yurita Ariani Arsyad	Indonesia	50.60	45.73	50.78				50.78	
19	Odette Palma	Chile	x	50.28	50.53				50.53	
20	Siti Shahida Abdullah	Malaysia	x	x	49.61				49.61	
21	Rukhsora Aslidinova	Tajikistan	35.65	35.30	x				35.65	
