= Volha Tsander =

Belarusian hammer thrower

Volha Mikhaylovna Tsander (Belarusian: Вольга Міхайлаўна Цандар; born 18 May 1976 in Grodno) is a Belarusian hammer thrower. Her personal best throw is 76.66 metres, achieved in July 2005 in Minsk.

== Achievements ==
Year	Competition	Venue	Position	Event	Notes
Representing Belarus
1994	World Junior Championships	Lisbon, Portugal	17th (q)	Shot put	14.26 m
1994	World Junior Championships	Lisbon, Portugal	5th	Discus	51.90 m
1997	European U23 Championships	Turku, Finland	8th	Discus	52.52 m
2000	Olympic Games	Sydney, Australia	—	Hammer	NM
2001	World Championships	Edmonton, Canada	10th	Hammer	64.10 m
2001	Universiade	Beijing, China	4th	Hammer	65.95 m
2002	European Championships	Munich, Germany	22nd	Hammer	61.39 m
2003	World Championships	Paris, France	—	Hammer	NM
2004	Olympic Games	Athens, Greece	6th	Hammer	72.27 m
2004	World Athletics Final	Szombathely, Hungary	2nd	Hammer	72.06 m
2005	World Championships	Helsinki, Finland	14th	Hammer	66.07 m
2005	World Athletics Final	Szombathely, Hungary	7th	Hammer	68.35 m
2006	European Championships	Gothenburg, Sweden	—	Hammer	NM
