= Julianna Tudja =

Hungarian hammer thrower

Júlianna ("Júlia") Tudja (born 13 October 1979 in Vác, Pest) is a female hammer thrower from Hungary. Her personal best is 67.52 metres, achieved in April 2004 in Walnut, California.

Tudja was an All-American thrower for the USC Trojans track and field team, finishing runner-up in the hammer throw at the 2003 NCAA Division I Outdoor Track and Field Championships.

== Achievements ==
Year	Competition	Venue	Position	Notes
1998	World Junior Championships	Annecy, France	6th	57.73 m
1998	European Championships	Budapest, Hungary	20th (q)	55.90 m
1999	European U23 Championships	Gothenburg, Sweden	11th	53.08 m
2001	European U23 Championships	Amsterdam, Netherlands	8th	60.52 m
2002	European Championships	Munich, Germany	21st (q)	61.46 m
2003	Universiade	Daegu, South Korea	9th	57.55 m
2004	Olympic Games	Athens, Greece	18th (q)	66.85 m
