= Croatia at the 2007 World Championships in Athletics =

- WA code: CRO
- National federation: Croatian Athletics Federation

in Osaka
- Competitors: 4
- Medals: Gold 1 Silver 0 Bronze 0 Total 1

World Championships in Athletics appearances
- 1993; 1995; 1997; 1999; 2001; 2003; 2005; 2007; 2009; 2011; 2013; 2015; 2017; 2019; 2022; 2023; 2025

Other related appearances
- Yugoslavia (1983–1991)

Croatia competed at the 2007 World Championships in Athletics with 4 athletes.

== Competitors ==
=== Men ===
Hammer Throw: András Haklits
Shot Put: Nedžad Mulabegović

=== Women ===
Hammer Throw: Ivana Brkljačić
High Jump: Blanka Vlašić
