= 2006 European Athletics Championships – Women's hammer throw =

Women's hammer throw at the European Athletics Championships

The Women's Hammer Throw event at the 2006 European Championships in Gothenburg, Sweden had a total number of 40 participating athletes. The final was held on Tuesday August 8, 2006, and the qualifying round on Monday August 7, 2006 with the mark set at 70.00 metres.

== Medalists ==
Gold	Tatyana Lysenko; Russia (RUS)
Silver	Gulfiya Khanafeyeva; Russia (RUS)
Bronze	Kamila Skolimowska; Poland (POL)

== Schedule ==
- All times are Central European Time (UTC+1)

Qualification Round
Group A	Group B
07.08.2006 – 10:15h	07.08.2006 – 12:30h
Final Round
08.08.2006 – 19:30h

== Abbreviations ==
- All results shown are in metres

Q	automatic qualification
q	qualification by rank
DNS	did not start
NM	no mark
WR	world record
AR	area record
NR	national record
PB	personal best
SB	season best

== Records ==
Standing records prior to the 2006 European Athletics Championships
World Record	Tatyana Lysenko (RUS)	77.41 m	June 24, 2006	Zhukovsky, Russia
Event Record	Olga Kuzenkova (RUS)	72.94 m	August 9, 2002	Munich, Germany
Broken records during the 2006 European Athletics Championships
Event Record	Tatyana Lysenko (RUS)	73.23 m	August 7, 2006	Gothenburg, Sweden
Event Record	Tatyana Lysenko (RUS)	74.85 m	August 8, 2006	Gothenburg, Sweden
Event Record	Tatyana Lysenko (RUS)	76.67 m	August 8, 2006	Gothenburg, Sweden

== Qualification ==
=== Group A ===
Rank	Overall	Athlete	Attempts			Distance	Note
Rank	Overall	Athlete	1	2	3	Distance	Note
1	5	Kamila Skolimowska (POL)	X	66.75	68.92	68.92 m	
2	6	Iryna Sekachyova (UKR)	68.81	X	68.31	68.81 m	
3	9	Volha Tsander (BLR)	67.54	65.72	X	67.54 m	
4	10	Gulfiya Khanafeyeva (RUS)	X	67.53	X	67.53 m	
5	11	Amélie Perrin (FRA)	66.10	59.83	67.28	67.28 m	
6	12	Alexandra Papayeoryiou (GRE)	65.37	X	66.81	66.81 m	
7	13	Susanne Keil (GER)	65.90	66.45	X	66.45 m	
8	14	Sini Pöyry (FIN)	64.12	62.24	65.72	65.72 m	
9	16	Cecilia Nilsson (SWE)	64.64	X	65.23	65.23 m	
10	17	Eileen O'Keeffe (IRL)	62.36	65.07	X	65.07 m	
11	19	Ester Balassini (ITA)	64.20	63.48	X	64.20 m	
12	23	Aksana Miankova (BLR)	X	62.85	X	62.85 m	
13	24	Mona Holm (NOR)	X	62.65	X	62.65 m	
14	25	Éva Orbán (HUN)	60.64	62.55	60.27	62.55 m	
15	27	Dolores Pedrares (ESP)	X	61.69	60.68	61.69 m	
16	32	Lenka Ledvinová (CZE)	60.85	60.47	X	60.85 m	
17	33	Vânia Silva (POR)	59.29	59.96	60.51	60.51 m	
18	34	Shirley Webb (GBR)	59.84	X	60.30	60.30 m	
19	35	Maris Rõngelep (EST)	X	56.09	60.10	60.10 m	
20	40	Vanessa Steen Mortensen (DEN)	55.33	55.68	X	55.68 m	

=== Group B ===
Rank	Overall	Athlete	Attempts			Distance	Note
Rank	Overall	Athlete	1	2	3	Distance	Note
1	1	Tatyana Lysenko (RUS)	73.23	—	—	73.23 m	CR
2	2	Betty Heidler (GER)	71.40	—	—	71.40 m	
3	3	Maryna Smalyachkova (BLR)	67.58	69.19	X	69.19 m	
4	4	Clarissa Claretti (ITA)	68.43	67.33	69.02	69.02 m	
5	7	Nataliya Zolotukhina (UKR)	65.78	64.56	68.65	68.65 m	SB
6	8	Kathrin Klaas (GER)	66.78	67.59	X	67.59 m	
7	15	Stéphanie Falzon (FRA)	X	65.53	65.71	65.71 m	
8	18	Katarzyna Kita (POL)	64.77	X	X	64.77 m	
9	20	Mihaela Melinte (ROM)	63.96	X	63.48	63.96 m	
10	21	Ivana Brkljačić (CRO)	63.31	56.66	X	63.31 m	
11	22	Yekaterina Khoroshikh (RUS)	X	X	62.97	62.97 m	
12	26	Martina Danisová (SVK)	62.39	X	X	62.39 m	
13	28	Silvia Salis (ITA)	57.60	X	61.69	61.69 m	
14	29	Vanda Nickl (HUN)	61.64	57.70	56.88	61.64 m	
15	30	Katalin Divós (HUN)	57.86	60.91	X	60.91 m	
16	31	Merja Korpela (FIN)	55.76	60.86	60.64	60.86 m	
17	36	Lucie Vrbenská (CZE)	55.83	59.94	X	59.94 m	
18	37	Berta Castells (ESP)	X	X	58.93	58.93 m	
19	38	Tracey Andersson (SWE)	X	58.77	X	58.77 m	
20	39	Zoe Derham (GBR)	56.94	X	X	56.94 m	

== Final ==
Rank	Athlete	Attempts						Distance	Note
Rank	Athlete	1	2	3	4	5	6	Distance	Note
1st place, gold medalist(s)	Tatyana Lysenko (RUS)	74.85	73.00	76.67	72.35	73.37	X	76.67 m	CR
2nd place, silver medalist(s)	Gulfiya Khanafeyeva (RUS)	70.40	X	71.04	68.47	74.50	73.94	74.50 m	
3rd place, bronze medalist(s)	Kamila Skolimowska (POL)	72.58	67.35	67.73	X	X	X	72.58 m	
4	Maryna Smalyachkova (BLR)	69.27	71.54	69.10	69.40	71.87	71.80	71.87 m	
5	Betty Heidler (GER)	X	70.89	69.61	70.12	70.11	65.55	70.89 m	
6	Kathrin Klaas (GER)	68.81	70.59	64.29	X	X	66.06	70.59 m	
7	Clarissa Claretti (ITA)	64.27	68.47	66.76	69.00	X	69.78	69.78 m	
8	Iryna Sekachyova (UKR)	67.51	X	68.50	69.08	65.36	68.97	69.08 m	
9	Alexandra Papayeoryiou (GRE)	X	X	67.95				67.95 m	
10	Nataliya Zolotukhina (UKR)	65.30	63.56	X				65.30 m	
11	Amélie Perrin (FRA)	62.36	X	X				62.36 m	
—	Volha Tsander (BLR)	X	X	X				NM	

== See also ==
- 2006 Hammer Throw Year Ranking
