= Stiliani Papadopoulou =

Greek hammer thrower

Stiliani ("Stella") Papadopoulou (Greek: Στυλιανή "Στέλλα" Παπαδοπούλου, born March 15, 1982) is a hammer thrower from Greece. She was born in Thessaloniki. Her personal best throw is 72.10 metres, achieved in July 2008 in Nikiti. This is the Greek record.

She finished eleventh at the 2008 Olympic Games. She also competed at the 2004 Olympic Games and the 2005 World Championships without reaching the finals.

== Achievements ==
Year	Competition	Venue	Position	Notes
Representing Greece
2003	European U23 Championships	Bydgoszcz, Poland	17th (q)	58.68 m
2004	Olympic Games	Athens, Greece	40th (q)	61.61 m
2005	World Championships	Helsinki, Finland	19th (q)	64.99 m
2008	Olympic Games	Beijing, PR China	11th	64.97 m
2009	World Championships	Berlin, Germany	21st (q)	67.33 m
2009	Mediterranean Games	Pescara, Italy	3rd	67.35 m
2009	World Athletics Final	Thessaloniki, Greece	8th	64.90 m
