= Athletics at the 2011 Pan American Games – Women's hammer throw =

Women's hammer throw at the 2011 Pan American Games
- Venue: Telmex Athletics Stadium
- Dates: October 24
- Competitors: 14 from 11 nations

Medalists
Gold medal	Yipsi Moreno	Cuba
Silver medal	Sultana Frizell	Canada
Bronze medal	Amber Campbell	United States

The women's hammer throw competition of the athletics events at the 2011 Pan American Games took place on the 24 of October at the Telmex Athletics Stadium. The defending Pan American Games champion is Yipsi Moreno of Cuba.

== Records ==
Prior to this competition, the existing world and Pan American Games records were as follows:

World record	Betty Heidler (GER)	79.42	Halle, Germany	May 21, 2011
Pan American Games record	Yipsi Moreno (CUB)	75.20	Rio de Janeiro, Brazil	July 23, 2007

== Qualification ==
Each National Olympic Committee (NOC) was able to enter up to two entrants providing they had met the minimum standard (58.00 meters) in the qualifying period (January 1, 2010 to September 14, 2011).

== Schedule ==
Date	Time	Round
October 24, 2011	14:25	Final

== Abbreviations ==
- All distances shown are in meters:centimeters

PR	Pan American Games record
WR	World record
NR	National record
PB	Personal best
SB	Season's best

== Results ==
14 athletes from 11 countries competed.

=== Final ===
Rank	Athlete	Nationality	#1	#2	#3	#4	#5	#6	Result	Notes
1st place, gold medalist(s)	Yipsi Moreno	Cuba	73.67	x	x	x	x	75.62	75.62	PR
2nd place, silver medalist(s)	Sultana Frizell	Canada	65.09	x	66.96	68.90	70.11	25.74	70.11	
3rd place, bronze medalist(s)	Amber Campbell	United States	66.54	x	x	69.93	x	x	69.93	
4	Arasay Thondike	Cuba	68.88	x	x	x	x	64.97	68.88	
5	Keelin Godsey	United States	67.84	65.06	x	67.24	62.61	61.41	67.84	
6	Jennifer Dahlgren	Argentina	x	65.59	x	x	67.11	x	67.11	
7	Odette Palma	Chile	x	x	63.69	x	x	64.79	64.79	
8	Rosa Rodríguez	Venezuela	64.07	64.78	x	x	x	63.08	64.78	
9	Josiane Soares	Brazil	59.73	x	61.47				61.47	
10	Crystal Smith	Canada	x	60.26	x				60.26	
11	Althea Charles	Antigua and Barbuda	52.86	56.89	59.49				59.49	PB
12	Eli Moreno	Colombia	x	56.91	59.23				59.23	
13	Natalie Grant	Jamaica	x	x	57.73				57.73	
14	Zuleyma Mina	Ecuador	57.16	x	56.72				57.16	
