= Merja Korpela =

Finnish hammer thrower (born 1981)

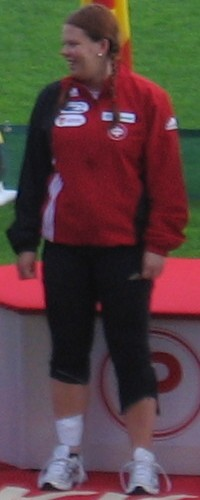
- Korpela in Kalevan kisat 2008

Personal information
- Nationality: Finnish
- Born: May 15, 1981 (age 45) Soini, Finland

Sport
- Sport: Athletics
- Event: Hammer

Achievements and titles
- Olympic finals: 30th (2008)
- Personal best: 69.56 m
- Updated on 20 August 2016

Merja Tuulikki Korpela (born 15 May 1981 in Soini) is a female hammer thrower from Finland. Her personal best throw is 69.56 metres, achieved in July 2009 in Belgrade.

She finished fourth at the 2000 World Junior Championships. She also competed at the 2002 European Championships, the 2006 European Championships and the 2007 World Championships and the 2008 Olympic Games without reaching the final.

== Competition record ==
Year	Competition	Venue	Position	Notes
Representing Finland
1998	World Junior Championships	Annecy, France	26th (q)	49.34 m
1999	European Junior Championships	Riga, Latvia	3rd	59.51 m
2000	World Junior Championships	Santiago, Chile	4th	59.59 m
2001	European U23 Championships	Amsterdam, Netherlands	5th	63.51 m
2002	European Championships	Munich, Germany	25th (q)	60.67 m
2003	European U23 Championships	Bydgoszcz, Poland	6th	64.44 m
2006	European Championships	Gothenburg, Sweden	31st (q)	60.86 m
2007	World Championships	Osaka, Japan	16th (q)	67.87 m
2008	Finnish Championships	Tampere, Finland	1st	67.43 m
2008	Olympic Games	Beijing, China	30th (q)	66.29 m
2009	Finnish Championships	Espoo, Finland	1st	66.91 m
2009	Universiade	Belgrade, Serbia	4th	69.56 m
2009	World Championships	Berlin, Germany	20th (q)	68.34 m
2010	European Championships	Barcelona, Spain	8th	68.21 m
2011	World Championships	Daegu, South Korea	24th (q)	65.64 m
2012	European Championships	Helsinki, Finland	19th (q)	64.03 m
2014	European Championships	Zürich, Switzerland	18th (q)	63.71 m
2016	European Championships	Amsterdam, Netherlands	13th (q)	67.78 m
