= Ivana Brkljačić =

Croatian hammer thrower (born 1983)

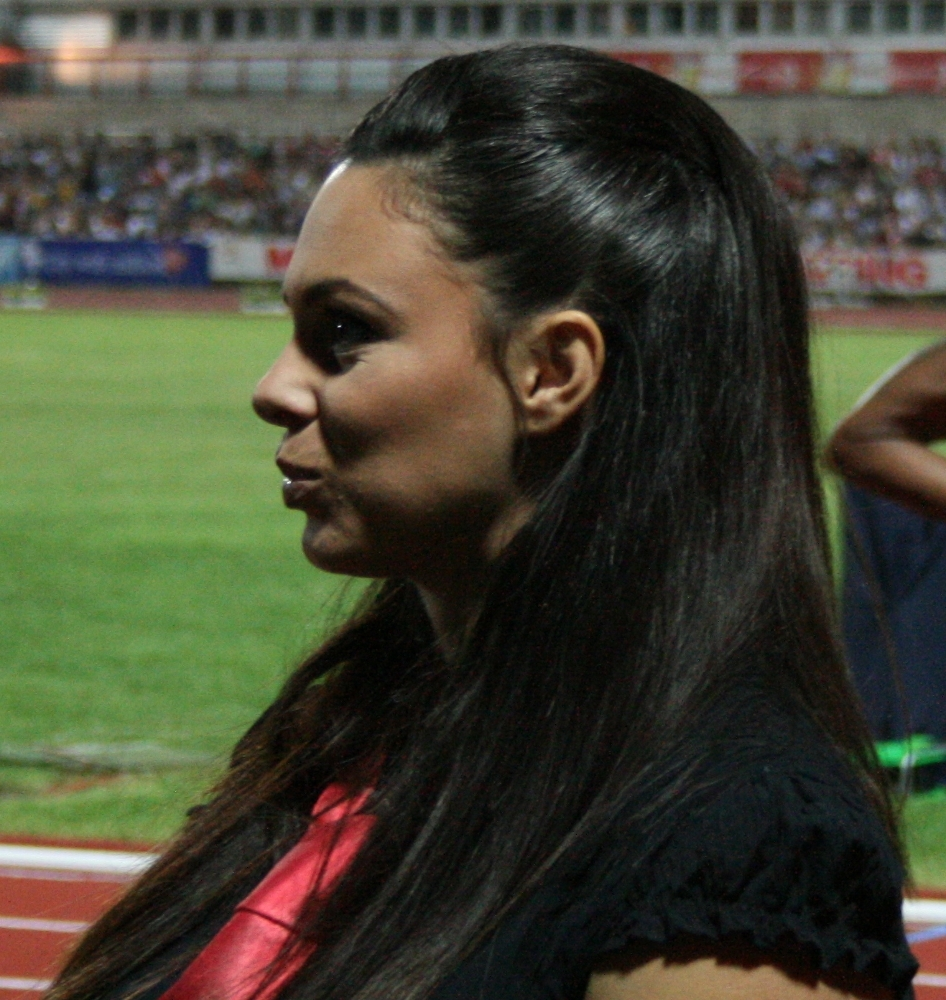
- Ivana Brkljačić in Zagreb, 2009

Personal information
- National team: Croatia
- Born: 25 January 1983 (age 43)

Sport
- Sport: Athletics
- Event: Hammer throw

Achievements and titles
- Personal best: Hammer throw: 75.08 m (2007)

Ivana Brkljačić (born 25 January 1983 in Villingen-Schwenningen, West Germany) is a female former hammer thrower from Croatia.

== Career ==
She achieved good results as a teenager, winning the World Junior Championships twice and finishing 11th in the 2000 Olympic finals at the age of 17. In the hammer throw contest at the 2004 Olympics she missed qualification to the final round by 6 centimetres.

Her personal best throw, and also a national record, is 75.08 metres, set at the June 2007 EAA meeting in Warsaw.

In 2009 Brkljačić became a director of the Hanžeković Memorial, a member of the IAAF World Challenge series of athletics meetings.

On 27 May 2010 Brkljačić announced her retirement from professional sport. Her last competition appearance was at the 2008 IAAF World Athletics Final in Stuttgart.

== Achievements ==
Year	Competition	Venue	Position	Notes
Representing Croatia
1998	World Junior Championships	Annecy, France	15th (q)	53.81 m
1998	European Championships	Budapest, Hungary	—	NM
1999	World Youth Championships	Bydgoszcz, Poland	3rd	55.69 m
1999	European Junior Championships	Riga, Latvia	5th	58.08 m
2000	Olympic Games	Sydney, Australia	11th	63.20 m
2000	World Junior Championships	Santiago, Chile	1st	62.22 m
2001	European Junior Championships	Grosseto, Italy	1st	64.18 m
2001	World Championships	Edmonton, Canada	8th	65.43 m
2001	Mediterranean Games	Radès, Tunisia	4th	61.44 m
2002	World Junior Championships	Kingston, Jamaica	1st	65.39 m
2002	European Championships	Munich, Germany	17th (q)	62.46 m
2003	European U23 Championships	Bydgoszcz, Poland	8th	63.04 m
2003	World Championships	Paris, France	35th (q)	60.06 m
2004	Olympic Games	Athens, Greece	13th (q)	68.21 m
2005	Mediterranean Games	Almería, Spain	7th	64.88 m
2005	World Championships	Helsinki, Finland	15th (q)	65.63 m
2006	European Championships	Gothenburg, Sweden	21st (q)	63.31 m
2006	World Athletics Final	Stuttgart, Germany	4th	66.90 m
2007	World Championships	Osaka, Japan	11th	68.16 m
2007	World Athletics Final	Stuttgart, Germany	2nd	73.22 m
2008	Olympic Games	Beijing, PR China	16th (q)	68.38 m
