= Nataliya Zolotukhina =

Ukrainian hammer thrower

Personal information
- Born: January 4, 1985 (age 41)
- Height: 1.80 m (5 ft 11 in)
- Weight: 87 kg (192 lb)

Sport
- Country: Ukraine
- Sport: Track and field
- Event: Hammer throw

Nataliya Zolotukhina (Ukrainian: Наталія Золотухіна; born 4 January 1985 in Kharkiv, in the Ukrainian SSR of the Soviet Union) is a female hammer thrower from Ukraine. Her personal best throw is 70.30 metres, achieved in May 2010 in Yalta. She competed at the 2016 Summer Olympics.

== Achievements ==
Year	Competition	Venue	Position	Notes
Representing Ukraine
2001	World Youth Championships	Debrecen, Hungary	5th	56.26 m
2002	World Junior Championships	Kingston, Jamaica	7th	58.47 m
2003	European Junior Championships	Tampere, Finland	5th	63.14 m
2004	World Junior Championships	Grosseto, Italy	10th	55.55 m
2005	European U23 Championships	Erfurt, Germany	3rd	67.75 m
2005	World Championships	Helsinki, Finland	13th (q)	66.36 m
2006	European Championships	Gothenburg, Sweden	10th	65.30 m
2007	European U23 Championships	Debrecen, Hungary	3rd	67.00 m
2007	World Championships	Osaka, Japan	29th (q)	63.64 m
2009	World Championships	Berlin, Germany	29th (q)	65.95 m
2010	European Championships	Barcelona, Spain	10th	67.53 m
2011	World Championships	Daegu, South Korea	19th (q)	67.57 m
2016	Olympic Games	Rio de Janeiro, Brazil	31st (q)	56.96 m
