= Marina Lapina =

Russian-born Azerbaijani hammer thrower

Personal information
- Full name: Marina Lapina
- Nationality: Azerbaijan
- Born: 6 March 1981 (age 45) Volgograd, Russian SFSR, Soviet Union
- Height: 1.75 m (5 ft 9 in)
- Weight: 85 kg (187 lb)

Sport
- Sport: Athletics
- Event: Hammer throw

Achievements and titles
- Personal bests: Hammer throw: 64.26 (2004)

Marina Lapina (born 6 March 1981 in Volgograd, Russian SFSR) is a retired Russian-born Azerbaijani hammer thrower. She was selected to compete for the Azerbaijan Olympic squad in the hammer throw at the 2004 Summer Olympics, after launching her personal best throw of 64.26 metres from the national athletics meet in Baku.

Lapina qualified as a lone female for the Azerbaijani athletics squad in the women's hammer throw at the 2004 Summer Olympics in Athens. Two months before the Games, she improved her personal best of 64.26 metres to attain an Olympic B-standard from the national athletics meet in Baku. During the prelims, Lapina tossed a hammer with a mediocre effort of 55.34 on her opening attempt, missing the target by nine metres from her personal best throw. As she continued to produce a second toss by a five-metre deficit from her first and granted a single foul on her third attempt, Lapina became the last among the forty-six remaining hammer throwers to earn a spot on the overall standings at the end of the qualifying stage.
