= Martina Hrašnová =

Slovak hammer thrower

Personal information
- Born: 21 March 1983 (age 43) Bratislava, Slovakia
- Height: 1.76 m (5 ft 9 in)
- Weight: 75 kg (165 lb)

Sport
- Country: Slovakia
- Now coaching: Jozef Hanušovský

Achievements and titles
- Olympic finals: 8th (Beijing, 2008)
- World finals: 3rd (Berlin, 2009)
- Regional finals: 2nd (Helsinki, 2012)
- Personal best: Hammer Throw : 76.90 m
Medal record
Women's athletics
Representing Slovakia
World Championships
Bronze medal – third place	2009 Berlin	Hammer throw
European Championships
Silver medal – second place	2012 Helsinki	Hammer throw
Silver medal – second place	2014 Zürich	Hammer throw
European Games
Gold medal – first place	2015 Baku	Mixed team
World Athletics Final
Silver medal – second place	2008 Stuttgart	Hammer throw
Bronze medal – third place	2009 Thessaloniki	Hammer throw
Universiade
Silver medal – second place	2009 Belgrade	Hammer throw
World Junior Championships
Silver medal – second place	2002 Kingston	Hammer throw
European Junior Championships
Silver medal – second place	2001 Grosseto	Hammer throw

Martina Danišová-Hrašnová, née Danišová (21 March 1983) is a Slovak hammer thrower. Her personal best throw is 76.90 metres, achieved in May 2009 in Trnava. She was suspended from the sport from August 2003 to August 2005, because a doping out-of-competition test found nandrolon in her body. She was taking maternity in the 2010 season.

== Achievements ==
Year	Competition	Venue	Position	Notes
Representing Slovakia
1999	World Youth Championships	Bydgoszcz, Poland	12th	46.38 m
2000	World Junior Championships	Santiago, Chile	5th	57.75 m
2001	European Junior Championships	Grosseto, Italy	2nd	61.97 m
2001	World Championships	Edmonton, Canada	23rd (q)	61.26 m
2002	World Junior Championships	Kingston, Jamaica	2nd	63.91 m
2002	European Championships	Munich, Germany	26th (q)	60.28 m
2003	European U23 Championships	Bydgoszcz, Poland	13th (q)	60.36 m
2006	European Championships	Gothenburg, Sweden	26th (q)	62.39 m
2007	Universiade	Bangkok, Thailand	5th	64.95 m
2007	World Championships	Osaka, Japan	13th (q)	68.15 m
2008	Olympic Games	Beijing, PR China	8th	71.00 m
2008	World Athletics Final	Stuttgart, Germany	2nd	71.40 m
2009	Universiade	Belgrade, Serbia	2nd	72.85 m
2009	World Championships	Berlin, Germany	3rd	74.79 m
2009	World Athletics Final	Thessaloniki, Greece	3rd	70.45 m
2012	European Championships	Helsinki, Finland	2nd	73.34 m
2014	European Championships	Zurich, Switzerland	2nd	73.05 m
2015	World Championships	Beijing, China	16th (q)	68.80 m
2016	European Championships	Amsterdam, Netherlands	7th	70.62 m
2016	Olympic Games	Rio de Janeiro, Brazil	19th (q)	67.63 m
2018	European Championships	Berlin, Germany	18th (q)	66.37 m
2019	World Championships	Doha, Qatar	9th	71.28 m
2021	Olympic Games	Tokyo, Japan	25th (q)	66.63 m
2023	World Championships	Budapest, Hungary	34th (q)	66.28 m
2024	European Championships	Rome, Italy	29th (q)	61.46 m
