= Rosa Rodríguez =

Venezuelan hammer thrower (born 1986)

Personal information
- Full name: Rosa Andreína Rodríguez Pargas
- Born: 2 July 1986 (age 40) Acarigua, Portuguesa, Venezuela
- Height: 1.80 m (5 ft 11 in)
- Weight: 85 kg (187 lb)

Sport
- Country: Venezuela
- Sport: Women's Athletics
Medal record
Women's athletics
Representing Venezuela
Military World Games
Bronze medal – third place	2011 Rio de Janeiro	Hammer throw
Pan American Games
Gold medal – first place	2015 Toronto	Hammer
Bronze medal – third place	2019 Lima	Hammer
CAC Games
Silver medal – second place	2010 Mayagüez	Hammer throw
South American Games
Bronze medal – third place	2026 Santa Fe	Hammer throw
Bolivarian Games
Silver medal – second place	2005 Armenia	Hammer throw
Silver medal – second place	2009 Sucre	Hammer throw
Bronze medal – third place	2009 Sucre	Shot put
Bronze medal – third place	2009 Sucre	Discus throw
CAC Championships
Silver medal – second place	2009 Havana	Hammer throw
Silver medal – second place	2011 Mayagüez	Hammer throw
- Updated on 15 June 2013

Rosa Andreína Rodríguez Pargas (Note: In this name that follows Hispanic American naming customs, the first or paternal surname is Rodríguez and the second or maternal family name is Pargas.) (born 2 July 1986) is a Venezuelan hammer thrower. She is the Venezuelan record holder for the event with her personal best of 72.83 metres, set in May 2012, which she improved to 73.64 in 2013. Rodríguez represented Venezuela at the World Championships in Athletics in 2007, 2009, 2013 and 2015.

A former South American hammer champion at youth and junior levels, she won her first major medal at the South American Championships in 2005. She is a two-time Ibero-American gold medallist (2008, 2012) and two-time runner-up at the Central American and Caribbean Championships (2009, 2011). She competed at the 2011 Pan American Games and has also won medals at the Central American and Caribbean Games and Military World Games.

== Career ==
As a youth Rodríguez competed in a variety of throwing events. At the 2001 World Youth Championships in Athletics she was a finalist in the shot put. The 2002 South American Youth Championships saw her win both the discus throw and hammer throw events, as well as a bronze medal in the shot put. She was a hammer finalist at the World Youth Championships, but was knocked out in qualifying at the 2004 World Junior Championships. She was crowned the South American Junior hammer champion in 2005.

In 2005, she won her first senior medal at the South American Championships in Cali, taking the bronze in the hammer. Later that year she set a South American junior record of 61.73 m in the event, while taking second place at the 2005 Bolivarian Games, and ended the year by improving this mark to 62.85 m. She broke the Venezuelan senior record in 2006 with a throw of 64.22 m in Barquisimeto. Her sole international medal that year came at the South American Under-23 Championships, where she came third behind Jennifer Dahlgren and Johana Moreno. She improved further in 2007, throwing the hammer 66.96 m in July. She was a silver medallist at the 2007 ALBA Games and represented Venezuela at the 2007 World Championships for the first time, competing in the qualifying round.

Rodríguez did not achieve the Olympic "B" standard of 67 metres in 2008 and missed the 2008 Beijing Olympics as a result. She was successful in regional competition, however, winning the titles at the Ibero-American and South American Under-23 Championships, as well as fifth place at the 2008 CAC Championships.

She missed out on the medals at the 2009 South American Championships, finishing fourth, but rebounded with a national record of 69.06 m at the 2009 CAC Championships to take second behind Arasay Thondike. She bettered that mark at the Bogotá leg of the South American Athletics Grand Prix, winning with 69.46 m. Returning to the world stage, she was eliminated in the qualification at the 2009 World Championships. That November she won shot put and hammer medals at the 2009 Bolivarian Games. Her 2010 season was highlighted by a bronze medal at the Ibero-American Championships, a silver medal at the 2010 Central American and Caribbean Games, and a year's best throw of 69.10 m to win the national title.

Rodríguez competed in many international events for Venezuela in 2011. She won her first continental medal since 2005 at the South American Championships, taking third place. She was runner-up at the 2011 CAC Championships, repeating her feat from 2009 and finishing behind Johana Moreno. She was a bronze medallist at the Military World Games held in Rio de Janeiro, won at the 2011 ALBA Games, and was eighth in the final at the Pan American Games. She began 2012 in top form and in May she improved her personal best to 72.83 m at a meeting in Croatia. A month later, the 2012 Ibero-American Championships in Athletics was hosted in her home town and she responded by winning the title in a championship record of 71.76 m.

== Personal bests ==
- Shot put: 15.07 m – Barquisimeto, Venezuela, 14 May 2011
- Discus throw: 44.63 m – Barquisimeto, Venezuela, 14 December 2011
- Hammer throw: 73.64 m – Barquisimeto, Venezuela, 16 May 2013

== International competitions ==
Year	Competition	Venue	Position	Event	Notes
Representing Venezuela
2001	World Youth Championships	Debrecen, Hungary	12th	Shot (4 kg)	12.63 m
2002	South American Youth Championships	Asunción, Paraguay	3rd	Shot	13.26 m
2002	South American Youth Championships	Asunción, Paraguay	1st	Discus	43.87 m
2002	South American Youth Championships	Asunción, Paraguay	1st	Hammer	57.90 m
2003	World Youth Championships	Sherbrooke, Canada	13th	Hammer	51.93 m
2004	South American U23 Championships	Barquisimeto, Venezuela	6th	Shot put	13.33 m
2004	South American U23 Championships	Barquisimeto, Venezuela	7th	Discus	42.55 m
2004	South American U23 Championships	Barquisimeto, Venezuela	5th	Hammer	55.98 m
2004	World Junior Championships	Grosseto, Italy	20th (q)	Hammer	53.10 m
2005	ALBA Games	Havana, Cuba	3rd	Hammer	60.02 m
2005	South American Championships	Cali, Colombia	3rd	Hammer	61.51 m
2005	Bolivarian Games	Armenia, Colombia	2nd	Hammer	61.73 m A
2005	South American Junior Championships	Rosario, Argentina	1st	Hammer	57.90 m
2006	South American U23 Championships / South American Games	Buenos Aires, Argentina	7th	Discus	40.59 m
2006	South American U23 Championships / South American Games	Buenos Aires, Argentina	3rd	Hammer	59.77 m
2007	ALBA Games	Caracas, Venezuela	2nd	Hammer	61.93 m
2007	World Championships	Osaka, Japan	35th (q)	Hammer	61.77 m
2008	Ibero-American Championships	Iquique, Chile	3rd	Hammer	65.96 m
2008	Central American and Caribbean Championships	Cali, Colombia	5th	Hammer	63.76 m
2008	South American U23 Championships	Lima, Peru	1st	Hammer	64.76 m
2009	ALBA Games	Havana, Cuba	5th	Hammer	62.79 m
2009	South American Championships	Lima, Peru	4th	Hammer	60.66 m
2009	Central American and Caribbean Championships	Havana, Cuba	2nd	Hammer	69.06 m
2009	World Championships	Berlin, Germany	30th (q)	Hammer	65.88 m
2009	Bolivarian Games	Sucre, Bolivia	3rd	Shot	14.32 m A
2009	Bolivarian Games	Sucre, Bolivia	3rd	Discus	39.72 m A
2009	Bolivarian Games	Sucre, Bolivia	2nd	Hammer	66.98 m A
2010	Ibero-American Championships	San Fernando, Spain	3rd	Hammer	67.58 m
2010	Central American and Caribbean Games	Mayagüez, Puerto Rico	2nd	Hammer	64.16 m
2011	South American Championships	Buenos Aires, Argentina	3rd	Hammer	67.28 m
2011	Central American and Caribbean Championships	Mayagüez, Puerto Rico	2nd	Hammer	65.09 m
2011	Military World Games	Rio de Janeiro, Brazil	3rd	Hammer	67.16 m
2011	ALBA Games	Barquisimeto, Venezuela	1st	Hammer	67.25 m
2011	Pan American Games	Guadalajara, Mexico	8th	Hammer	64.78 m
2012	Ibero-American Championships	Barquisimeto, Venezuela	1st	Hammer	71.76 m
2012	Olympic Games	London, United Kingdom	27th (q)	Hammer	67.34 m
2013	South American Championships	Cartagena, Colombia	1st	Hammer	68.38 m
2013	World Championships	Moscow, Russia	15th (q)	Hammer	69.35 m
2013	Bolivarian Games	Trujillo, Peru	1st	Hammer	73.36 m
2014	South American Games	Santiago, Chile	1st	Hammer	68.61 m
2014	Central American and Caribbean Games	Xalapa, Mexico	4th	Hammer	67.47 m A
2015	South American Championships	Lima, Peru	8th	Shot	13.66 m
2015	South American Championships	Lima, Peru	1st	Hammer	71.66 m
2015	Pan American Games	Toronto, Canada	1st	Hammer	71.61 m
2015	World Championships	Beijing, China	11th	Hammer	67.78 m
2016	Olympic Games	Rio de Janeiro, Brazil	10th (q)	Hammer	69.26 m
2017	Bolivarian Games	Santa Marta, Colombia	1st	Hammer	66.31 m
2018	South American Games	Cochabamba, Bolivia	2nd	Hammer	70.93 m
2018	Central American and Caribbean Games	Barranquilla, Colombia	1st	Hammer	67.91 m
2018	Ibero-American Championships	Trujillo, Peru	2nd	Hammer	67.93 m
2019	South American Championships	Lima, Peru	2nd	Hammer	66.45 m
2019	Pan American Games	Lima, Peru	3rd	Hammer	69.48 m
2021	Olympic Games	Tokyo, Japan	22nd (q)	Hammer	68.23 m
2022	South American Games	Asunción, Paraguay	1st	Hammer	68.12 m
2023	Central American and Caribbean Games	San Salvador, El Salvador	1st	Hammer	71.62 m
2023	South American Championships	São Paulo, Brazil	1st	Hammer	22.22 m
2023	World Championships	Budapest, Hungary	14th (q)	Hammer	70.81 m
2023	Pan American Games	Santiago, Chile	2nd	Hammer	71.59 m
2024	Ibero-American Championships	Cuiabá, Brazil	1st	Hammer	70.95 m
2024	Olympic Games	Paris, France	8th	Hammer	72.98 m
2025	South American Championships	Mar del Plata, Argentina	1st	Hammer	71.04 m
2025	Bolivarian Games	Lima, Peru	1st	Hammer	69.97 m
2026	Central American and Caribbean Games	Santo Domingo, Dominican Republic	2nd	Hammer	66.17 m
2026	South American Games	Santa Fe, Argentina	3rd	Hammer	64.34 m
