= Andrea Kéri =

Hungarian hammer thrower

Personal information
- Born: 2 July 1984 (age 41)

Sport
- Country: Hungary
- Sport: Athletics
- Event: Hammer throw

Achievements and titles
- Personal best: Hammer throw: 63.27 m (2003)

Andrea Kéri (born 3 July 1984) is a Hungarian female hammer thrower, who won an individual gold medal at the Youth World Championships.
