= Valentina Srša =

Croatian hammer thrower

Personal information
- Born: 16 January 1986 (age 40)

Sport
- Country: Croatia
- Sport: Athletics
- Event: Hammer throw

Achievements and titles
- Personal best: Hammer throw: 63.19 m (2003)

Valentina Srša (born 16 January 1986) is a Croatian hammer thrower, who won an individual gold medal at the Youth World Championships.
