= 1998 European Athletics Championships – Women's hammer throw =

Women's hammer throw at the European Athletics Championships

The final of the Women's Hammer Throw event at the 1998 European Championships in Budapest, Hungary was held on Saturday August 22, 1998. There were a total number of 35 participating athletes. The qualifying rounds were staged a day earlier, on Friday August 21, with the mark set at 61.50 metres. It was the first time in history that women competed in the hammer throw at the European Championships.

== Medalists ==
Gold	Mihaela Melinte; Romania (ROM)
Silver	Olga Kuzenkova; Russia (RUS)
Bronze	Kirsten Münchow; Germany (GER)

== Abbreviations ==
- All results shown are in metres

Q	automatic qualification
q	qualification by rank
DNS	did not start
NM	no mark
WR	world record
AR	area record
CR	championship record
NR	national record
PB	personal best
SB	season best

== Records ==
Standing records prior to the 1998 European Athletics Championships
World Record	Mihaela Melinte (ROM)	73.14 m	July 16, 1998	Poiana Brasov, Romania
Event Record	New Event			
Season Best	Olga Kuzenkova (RUS)	73.80 m	May 15, 1998	Togliattigrad, Russia
Broken records during the 1998 European Athletics Championships
Event Record	Mihaela Melinte (ROM)	71.17 m	August 22, 1998	Budapest, Hungary

== Qualification ==
=== Final ranking ===
Rank	Athlete	Attempts			Distance	Note
Rank	Athlete	1	2	3	Distance	Note
1	Mihaela Melinte (ROM)				68.65 m	
2	Kirsten Münchow (GER)				66.81 m	
3	Svetlana Sudak (BLR)				64.12 m	
4	Olga Kuzenkova (RUS)				64.10 m	
5	Kamila Skolimowska (POL)				62.72 m	SB
6	Alla Davydova (RUS)				62.69 m	
7	Lyudmila Gubkina (BLR)				62.46 m	
8	Simone Mathes (GER)				62.25 m	
9	Katalin Divós (HUN)				61.62 m	
10	Lorraine Shaw (GBR)				61.11 m	
11	Lyn Sprules (GBR)				60.64 m	SB
12	Manuela Priemer (GER)				59.15 m	
13	Agnieszka Pogroszewska (POL)				58.88 m	
14	Florence Ezeh (FRA)				58.72 m	
15	Sini Pöyry (FIN)				58.61 m	
16	Tatyana Konstantinova (RUS)				58.35 m	
17	Jolanta Borawska (POL)				57.79 m	
18	Mia Strömmer (FIN)				57.40 m	
19	Ester Balassini (ITA)				56.42 m	
20	Julianna Tudja (HUN)				55.90 m	
21	Iryna Sekachova (UKR)				55.37 m	
22	Cécile Lignot-Maubert (FRA)				54.68 m	
23	Dolores Pedrares (ESP)	52.10	54.34	51.01	54.34 m	
24	Barbara Sugar (HUN)				54.29 m	
25	Manuela Montebrun (FRA)				54.13 m	
26	Maria Tranchina (ITA)				53.87 m	
27	Jennifer Petit (BEL)				53.63 m	
28	Unn Merete Lie (NOR)				53.01 m	
29	Nicola Coffey (IRL)				52.63 m	
30	Nesrin Kaya (TUR)				51.70 m	
31	Sonia Martins (POR)				50.70 m	
32	Charlotte Wahlin (DEN)				50.62 m	
—	Ivana Brkljačić (CRO)	X	X	X	NM	
—	Olivia Kelleher (IRL)	X	X	X	NM	

== Final ==
Rank	Athlete	Attempts						Distance	Note
Rank	Athlete	1	2	3	4	5	6	Distance	Note
1st place, gold medalist(s)	Mihaela Melinte (ROM)	68.41	66.19	69.02	X	70.63	71.17	71.17 m	CR
2nd place, silver medalist(s)	Olga Kuzenkova (RUS)	69.23	69.28	63.72	X	X	X	69.28 m	
3rd place, bronze medalist(s)	Kirsten Münchow (GER)	X	61.28	X	61.03	X	65.61	65.61 m	
4	Simone Mathes (GER)	56.29	63.60	X	X	62.96	64.05	64.05 m	
5	Katalin Divós (HUN)	63.74	58.90	X	60.04	61.93	X	63.74 m	NR
6	Lyudmila Gubkina (BLR)	62.15	X	X	X	X	63.03	63.03 m	
7	Kamila Skolimowska (POL)	X	61.50	62.68	X	59.63	X	62.68 m	
8	Alla Davydova (RUS)	60.47	60.88	60.91	62.36	61.92	61.62	62.36 m	
9	Svetlana Sudak (BLR)	60.14	X	60.12				60.14 m	
10	Manuela Priemer (GER)	58.07	59.47	X				59.47 m	
11	Lorraine Shaw (GBR)	X	54.55	58.19				58.19 m	
12	Lyn Sprules (GBR)	X	57.68	X				57.68 m	

== See also ==
- 1998 Hammer Throw Year Ranking
