= Lesley Brannan =

Welsh hammer thrower

Personal information
- Nationality: British (Welsh)
- Born: 13 September 1976 (age 49) Connah's Quay, Flintshire, Wales

Sport
- Sport: Athletics
- Event: hammer throw
- Club: Wrexham AC

Lesley Brannan (born 13 September 1976) is a Welsh hammer thrower.

== Biography ==
Brannan was born in Connah's Quay, Flintshire. She represented Wales at the 2002 Commonwealth Games in Manchester.

Her personal best throw is 63.05 metres, achieved in February 2006 in Manchester, which placed her sixth on the British outdoor all-time list at the time, behind Lorraine Shaw, Shirley Webb, Zoe Derham, Lyn Sprules and Liz Pidgeon. The same year, Brannan finished third behind Eileen O'Keeffe in the hammer throw event at the 2006 AAA Championships.

Brannan participated in a second Commonwealth Games when she represented the 2006 Welsh team at the 2006 Commonwealth Games in Melbourne.

== International competitions ==
Year	Competition	Venue	Position	Notes
Representing Wales
2002	Commonwealth Games	Manchester, England	14th (q)	55.90 m
2006	Commonwealth Games	Melbourne, Australia	8th	61.55 m
