= Laura Douglas (athlete) =

Welsh hammer thrower

Laura Jones (born 4 January 1983) is a Welsh hammer thrower.

Jones was born in Wrexham. Her personal best throw is 64.74 metres, achieved in August 2010 in Hendon. This places her seventh on the British outdoor all-time list, behind Lorraine Shaw, Shirley Webb, Zoe Derham, Carys Parry, Sophie Hitchon and Sarah Holt. Jones is also ranked second all-time amongst Welsh throwers, behind Parry. She represented Wales at the Commonwealth Games for a third consecutive time in 2010. Laura now teaches at a primary school in Cheshire. Since this series of events, she has been married and is now known as Laura Jones.

== International competitions ==
Year	Competition	Venue	Position	Notes
Representing Great Britain and Wales
2002	Commonwealth Games	Manchester, England	19th (q)	50.12 m
2002	World Junior Championships	Kingston, Jamaica	18th (q)	52.65 m
2005	European U23 Championships	Erfurt, Germany	17th (q)	57.42 m
2006	Commonwealth Games	Melbourne, Australia	9th	60.35 m
