= Athletics at the 2006 Commonwealth Games – Women's hammer throw =

Women's hammer throw at the Commonwealth Games

The women's hammer throw event at the 2006 Commonwealth Games was held on 20 March 2006.

The winning margin was 61 cm which as of 2024 remains the only time the women's hammer throw was won by under a metre at these games.

== Results ==
Rank	Athlete	Nationality	#1	#2	#3	#4	#5	#6	Result	Notes
1st place, gold medalist(s)	Brooke Krueger	Australia	64.39	x	64.76	67.90	65.86	x	67.90	GR
2nd place, silver medalist(s)	Jennifer Joyce	Canada	x	67.29	x	64.93	65.94	65.83	67.29	
3rd place, bronze medalist(s)	Lorraine Shaw	England	57.60	63.56	64.15	61.46	66.00	63.92	66.00	SB
4	Karyne di Marco	Australia	62.06	61.64	61.06	59.75	62.23	61.19	62.23	
5	Zoe Derham	England	59.36	57.56	60.91	61.92	60.63	59.68	61.92	
6	Carys Parry	Wales	59.65	60.97	59.99	56.91	61.80	61.09	61.80	PB
7	Gabrielle Neighbour	Australia	54.35	61.55	x	61.21	58.65	x	61.55	
8	Lesley Brannan	Wales	60.89	60.78	57.79	x	61.07	61.55	61.55	
9	Laura Douglas	Wales	57.65	60.35	59.42				60.35	
10	Shirley Webb	Scotland	x	59.16	59.31				59.31	
11	Olufunke Adeoye	Nigeria	57.26	56.65	56.84				57.26	
	Paraskevi Theodorou	Cyprus	x	x	x				NM	
