= Athletics at the 2010 Commonwealth Games – Women's hammer throw =

Women's hammer throw at the Commonwealth Games

The Women's hammer throw at the 2010 Commonwealth Games as part of the athletics programme was held at the Jawaharlal Nehru Stadium on Wednesday 6 October and Thursday 7 October 2010.

== Records ==
World Record	78.30	Anita Włodarczyk	POL	Bydgoszcz, POL	6 June 2010
Games Record	67.90	Brooke Krueger	AUS	Melbourne, Australia	2006

== Results ==
=== Qualifying round ===
Qualification: Qualifying Performance 62.00 (Q) or at least 12 best performers (q) advance to the Final.

Rank	Athlete	Group	1	2	3	Result	Notes
1	Carys Parry (WAL)	A	63.53	–	–	63.53	Q
2	Sultana Frizell (CAN)	B	x	x	63.46	63.46	Q
3	Zoe Derham (ENG)	A	62.33	–	–	62.33	Q
4	Megann Rodhe (CAN)	B	x	x	62.06	62.06	Q
5	Gabrielle Neighbour (AUS)	A	61.39	61.44	61.76	61.76	q
6	Crystal Smith (CAN)	A	x	56.84	60.94	60.94	q
7	Karyne di Marco (AUS)	A	59.89	60.77	60.55	60.77	q
8	Bronwyn Eagles (AUS)	B	57.47	58.56	60.37	60.37	q
9	Natalie Grant (JAM)	B	60.18	56.74	58.40	60.18	q, SB
10	Paraskevi Theodorou (CYP)	A	56.23	59.96	x	59.96	q
11	Hardeep Kaur (IND)	B	59.63	59.72	59.73	59.73	q
12	Laura Douglas (WAL)	B	x	58.69	59.52	59.52	q
13	Linda Benin (GHA)	A	51.81	58.05	59.33	59.33	PB
14	Sarah Holt (ENG)	B	x	57.91	x	57.91	
15	Manju Bala (IND)	A	x	51.72	54.84	54.84	
16	Althea Charles (ANT)	B	54.16	53.08	51.46	54.16	
17	Linda Oseso (KEN)	B	52.14	49.41	x	52.14	

=== Final ===
Rank	Athlete	1	2	3	4	5	6	Result	Notes
1st place, gold medalist(s)	Sultana Frizell (CAN)	59.87	68.57	x	66.47	68.07	x	68.57	GR
2nd place, silver medalist(s)	Carys Parry (WAL)	62.29	64.93	64.76	64.19	x	63.94	64.93	SB
3rd place, bronze medalist(s)	Zoe Derham (ENG)	64.04	61.76	57.52	61.06	61.51	x	64.04	
4	Gabrielle Neighbour (AUS)	59.97	63.00	60.83	63.46	63.06	62.48	63.46	
5	Bronwyn Eagles (AUS)	56.31	61.03	63.43	58.91	62.40	63.11	63.43	
6	Karyne di Marco (AUS)	60.64	62.38	61.99	62.37	59.37	62.34	62.38	
7	Megann Rodhe (CAN)	62.36	61.64	x	x	x	61.92	62.36	
8	Laura Douglas (WAL)	61.05	58.67	59.59	x	60.45	x	61.05	
9	Natalie Grant (JAM)	59.31	60.26	58.08				60.26	SB
10	Hardeep Kaur (IND)	x	x	59.96				59.96	
11	Crystal Smith (CAN)	x	59.65	x				59.65	
12	Paraskevi Theodorou (CYP)	58.89	x	59.55				59.55	
