= Tatyana Konstantinova =

Tatyana Konstantinova may refer to:

- Tatyana Konstantinova (athlete) (born 1970), Russian retired hammer thrower
- Tatyana Konstantinova (handballer) (born 1984), team handball player from Kazakhstan
