= Athletics at the 1997 Summer Universiade – Women's hammer throw =

Women's hammer throw competition at the 1997 Summer Universiade took place on August 29, 1997 in Catania, Italy. The event was contested for the first time at the Summer Universiade.

== Medalists ==
Gold	Silver	Bronze
Mihaela Melinte; Romania	Olga Kuzenkova; Russia	Deborah Sosimenko; Australia

== Results ==
=== Qualification ===
Rank	Group	Athlete	Nationality	Result	Notes
1	A	Mihaela Melinte	Romania	68.26	Q
2	A	Olga Kuzenkova	Russia	64.86	Q
3	?	Deborah Sosimenko	Australia	60.44	Q
4	?	Lyudmila Gubkina	Belarus	59.74	Q
4	?	Nataliya Kunytska	Ukraine	59.74	Q
6	?	Inga Beyer	Germany	59.46	Q
7	?	Renetta Seiler	United States	59.20	Q
8	?	Dawn Ellerbe	United States	58.58	Q
9	?	Caroline Fournier	Mauritius	56.34	Q
10	?	Norbi Balantén	Cuba	55.86	
11	?	Svetlana Sudak	Belarus	55.74	
12	?	Diana Holden	Great Britain	53.86	
13	?	Brenda MacNaughton	Australia	53.38	
14	?	Renate Beunder	Netherlands	52.84	
15	?	Olivia Kelleher	Ireland	52.12	
16	?	Chiao Man	Chinese Taipei	50.50	
17	?	Claudia Becerril	Mexico	50.40	
18	?	Violeta Guzmán	Mexico	49.64	
19	?	Dragana Simić	Croatia	49.38	
20	?	Simona Kozmus	Slovenia	46.90	
21	?	Helena Engman	Sweden	44.10	
22	?	Loreta Zengjinazi	Albania	42.84	
23	?	Ana Lucía Espinoza	Guatemala	40.78	

=== Final ===
Rank	Athlete	Attempts						Distance	Note
Rank	Athlete	1	2	3	4	5	6	Distance	Note
1st place, gold medalist(s)	Mihaela Melinte (ROM)							69.84 m	
2nd place, silver medalist(s)	Olga Kuzenkova (RUS)							65.96 m	
3rd place, bronze medalist(s)	Deborah Sosimenko (AUS)							65.02 m	
4	Lyudmila Gubkina (BLR)							63.48 m	
5	Svetlana Sudak (BLR)							61.70 m	
6	Dawn Ellerbe (USA)							61.52 m	
7	Caroline Fournier (MRI)							59.84 m	
8	Nataliya Kunytska (UKR)							57.52 m	
9	Renetta Seiler (USA)							57.42 m	
10	Norbi Balantén (CUB)							56.18 m	
11	Inga Beyer (GER)							55.52 m	
12	Diana Holden (GBR)							52.54 m	

== See also ==
- 1997 Hammer Throw Year Ranking
