= Athletics at the 2003 Pan American Games – Women's hammer throw =

Women's hammer throw at the Pan American Games

The final of the Women's Hammer Throw event at the 2003 Pan American Games took place on Tuesday August 5, 2003.

== Medalists ==
Gold	Yipsi Moreno; Cuba
Silver	Yunaika Crawford; Cuba
Bronze	Candice Scott; Trinidad and Tobago

== Records ==
World Record	Mihaela Melinte (ROM)	76.07 m	August 29, 1999	Rüdlingen, Switzerland
Pan Am Record	Dawn Ellerbe (USA)	65.36 m	July 24, 1999	Winnipeg, Canada

== Results ==
Rank	Athlete	Attempts						Result
Rank	Athlete	1	2	3	4	5	6	Result
1	Yipsi Moreno (CUB)	X	73.75	73.05	74.25	73.89	X	74.25 m
2	Yunaika Crawford (CUB)	63.57	X	X	65.07	69.57	67.99	69.57 m
3	Candice Scott (TRI)	X	X	64.16	X	69.06	X	69.06 m
4	Anna Mahon (USA)	63.83	67.00	64.80	64.37	66.28	67.09	67.09 m
5	Dawn Ellerbe (USA)	63.23	X	65.75	X	60.81	64.28	65.75 m
6	Natalie Grant (JAM)	57.44	57.28	X	X	59.13	59.99	59.99 m
7	Violeta Guzmán (MEX)	57.99	58.31	X	56.99	X	57.44	58.31 m
8	Nancy Guillén (ESA)	56.82	X	X	X	56.30	57.30	57.30 m
9	Jennifer Joyce (CAN)	55.51	X	X				55.51 m
10	Odette Palma (CHI)	53.51	54.14	52.46				54.14 m
11	Mary Mercedes (DOM)	51.50	50.36	X				51.50 m
12	Anneris Méndez (DOM)	X	45.86	47.41				47.41 m
—	Kimberly Barrett (JAM)	—	—	—				DNS

== See also ==
- 2003 World Championships in Athletics – Women's hammer throw
- 2003 Hammer Throw Year Ranking
- Athletics at the 2004 Summer Olympics – Women's hammer throw
