= 1999 World Championships in Athletics – Women's hammer throw =

These are the official results of the Women's Hammer Throw event at the 1999 IAAF World Championships in Athletics in Seville, Spain. There were a total number of 21 participating athletes, with the final held on Tuesday 24 August 1999 at 18:00h.

This marked the debut of the event at the World Championships in Athletics.

== Medalists ==
Gold	Mihaela Melinte; Romania (ROM)
Silver	Olga Kuzenkova; Russia (RUS)
Bronze	Lisa Misipeka; American Samoa (ASA)

== Schedule ==
- All times are Central European Time (UTC+1)

Final Round
24.08.1999 – 18:00h

== Startlist ==
Order	№	Athlete	Season Best	Personal Best
1	42	Deborah Sosimenko (AUS)	66.78	67.16
2	431	Kirsten Münchow (GER)	66.08	66.82
3	217	Yipsi Moreno (CUB)	66.34	66.34
4	338	Florence Ezeh (FRA)	66.12	66.12
5	1000	Amy Palmer (USA)	67.24	67.24
6	793	Mihaela Melinte (ROM)	75.97	75.97
7	433	Manuela Priemer (GER)	66.30	66.30
8	348	Cécile Lignot-Maubert (FRA)	65.39	65.39
9	838	Tatyana Konstantinova (RUS)	72.09	72.09
10	96	Svetlana Sudak (BLR)	68.21	68.21
11	8	Lisa Misipeka (ASA)	67.00	67.00
12	844	Olga Kuzenkova (RUS)	74.30	74.30
13	85	Lyudmila Gubkina (BLR)	68.27	68.27
14	352	Manuela Montebrun (FRA)	68.11	68.11
15	1012	Dawn Ellerbe (USA)	70.16	70.16
16	120	Anelia Yordanova (BUL)	65.10	65.10
17	426	Simone Mathes (GER)	67.13	67.13
18	490	Katalin Divós (HUN)	67.20	67.20
19	275	Dolores Pedrares (ESP)	61.28	61.28
20	754	Kamila Skolimowska (POL)	66.62	66.62
21	385	Lorraine Shaw (GBR)	67.21	66.75

== Records ==
Standing records prior to the 1999 World Athletics Championships
World Record	Mihaela Melinte (ROM)	75.97 m	May 13, 1999	Clermont-Ferrand, France
Event Record	New Event			
Season Best	Olga Kuzenkova (RUS)	74.30 m	June 4, 1999	Moscow, Russia
Broken records during the 1999 World Athletics Championships
Event Record	Mihaela Melinte (ROM)	75.20 m	August 24, 1999	Seville, Spain

== Final ==
Rank	Athlete	Attempts						Distance
Rank	Athlete	1	2	3	4	5	6	Distance
1st place, gold medalist(s)	Mihaela Melinte (ROM)	71.57	73.23	74.21	70.58	X	75.20	75.20 m
2nd place, silver medalist(s)	Olga Kuzenkova (RUS)	X	68.18	71.79	69.23	X	72.56	72.56 m
3rd place, bronze medalist(s)	Lisa Misipeka (ASA)	65.02	65.02	X	64.44	66.06	65.85	66.06 m
4	Katalin Divós (HUN)	64.63	X	65.86	X	X	X	65.86 m
5	Deborah Sosimenko (AUS)	65.52	X	61.56	62.92	63.79	63.85	65.52 m
6	Lyudmila Gubkina (BLR)	64.12	X	62.99	65.33	65.44	65.44	65.44 m
7	Simone Mathes (GER)	64.93	X	63.08	64.66	63.08	62.36	64.93 m
8	Kirsten Münchow (GER)	X	X	64.03	59.91	63.58	63.05	64.03 m
9	Svetlana Sudak (BLR)	62.81	62.88	63.99				63.99 m
10	Dawn Ellerbe (USA)	X	59.73	63.55				63.55 m
11	Tatyana Konstantinova (RUS)	59.39	62.52	62.16				62.52 m
12	Manuela Montebrun (FRA)	62.44	X	X				62.44 m
13	Cécile Lignot-Maubert (FRA)	X	X	62.14				62.14 m
14	Lorraine Shaw (GBR)	62.09	61.54	X				62.09 m
15	Manuela Priemer (GER)	61.99	60.44	59.16				61.99 m
16	Florence Ezeh (FRA)	57.58	58.82	60.74				60.74 m
17	Amy Palmer (USA)	59.24	58.76	59.80				59.80 m
18	Yipsi Moreno (CUB)	X	X	58.68				58.68 m
19	Dolores Pedrares (ESP)	X	57.66	54.84				57.66 m
20	Anelia Yordanova (BUL)	X	53.20	X				53.20 m
21	Kamila Skolimowska (POL)	50.38	X	X				50.38 m

== See also ==
- Athletics at the 1999 Pan American Games - Women's hammer throw
- 1999 Hammer Throw Year Ranking
