= Athletics at the 1999 Summer Universiade – Women's hammer throw =

The women's hammer throw event at the 1999 Summer Universiade was held at the Estadio Son Moix in Palma de Mallorca, Spain on 8 and 9 July.

== Medalists ==
Gold	Silver	Bronze
Mihaela Melinte; Romania	Lyudmila Gubkina; Belarus	Manuela Montebrun; France

== Results ==
=== Qualification ===
Qualification: 62.00 (Q) or at least 12 best performers (q) advance to the final

Rank	Group	Athlete	Nationality	#1	#2	#3	Result	Notes
1	A	Mihaela Melinte	Romania	69.61			69.61	Q
2	B	Dawn Ellerbe	United States	61.20	65.05		65.05	Q
3	A	Lyudmila Gubkina	Belarus	64.30			64.30	Q
4	B	Volha Tsander	Belarus				63.36	Q
5	B	Deborah Sosimenko	Australia				62.81	Q
6	A	Ester Balassini	Italy				61.04	q
7	A	Karyne Perkins	Australia				61.00	q
8	B	Manuela Montebrun	France				60.50	q
9	B	Susanne Keil	Germany				60.02	q
10	A	Melissa Price	United States				59.85	q
11	A	Rachel Beverley	Great Britain				59.33	q
12	A	Nataliya Kunytska	Ukraine				59.15	q
13	B	Iryna Sekachova	Ukraine				59.14	
14	B	Norbi Balantén	Cuba				58.82	
15	B	Michelle Fournier	Canada				58.70	
16	B	Nancy Guillén	El Salvador				58.61	
17	B	Tasha Williams	New Zealand				58.44	
18	A	Cécile Lignot	France				57.35	
19	B	Nesrin Kaya	Turkey				57.03	
20	A	Olivia Kelleher	Ireland				55.79	
21	A	Dolores Pedrares	Spain	55.00	x	55.61	55.61	
22	A	Charlotte Wahlin	Denmark				55.42	
23	B	Nicola Coffey	Ireland				53.66	
24	A	Wendy Koolhaas	Netherlands				53.45	
25	A	Patti Pilsner-Steinke	Canada				52.79	
26	B	Simona Kozmus	Slovenia				49.82	
27	A	Helena Engman	Sweden				48.10	
	B	Mari Närhi	Finland				NM	
	A	Ana Lucia Espinosa	Guatemala				DNS	
	B	Violeta Guzmán	Mexico				DNS	

=== Final ===
Rank	Athlete	Nationality	#1	#2	#3	#4	#5	#6	Result	Notes
1st place, gold medalist(s)	Mihaela Melinte	Romania	71.43	71.10	74.24	x	74.10	x	74.24	UR
2nd place, silver medalist(s)	Lyudmila Gubkina	Belarus	x	65.73	66.31	66.83	x	68.27	68.27	PB
3rd place, bronze medalist(s)	Manuela Montebrun	France	x	63.05	63.47	68.11	60.42	64.32	68.11	
4	Dawn Ellerbe	United States	67.52	67.27	62.23	x	65.45	60.51	67.52	
5	Deborah Sosimenko	Australia							62.88	
6	Volha Tsander	Belarus							62.84	
7	Susanne Keil	Germany							62.10	
8	Karyne Perkins	Australia							60.85	
9	Rachel Beverley	Great Britain							59.06	
10	Ester Balassini	Italy							58.91	
11	Melissa Price	United States							58.78	
12	Nataliya Kunytska	Ukraine							57.71	
