= Athletics at the 1998 Commonwealth Games – Women's hammer throw =

Women's hammer throw at the Commonwealth Games

The women's hammer throw event at the 1998 Commonwealth Games was held on 16 September in Kuala Lumpur.

This was the first time that this event was contested at the Commonwealth Games.

== Results ==
Rank	Name	Nationality	#1	#2	#3	#4	#5	#6	Result	Notes
1st place, gold medalist(s)	Deborah Sosimenko	Australia	x	64.85	66.56	64.49	61.89	x	66.56	
2nd place, silver medalist(s)	Lorraine Shaw	England	x	x	61.81	x	62.66	x	62.66	
3rd place, bronze medalist(s)	Caroline Wittrin	Canada	58.16	61.67	60.61	58.10	59.03	58.37	61.67	PB
4	Karyne Perkins	Australia	60.65	x	59.96	59.42	58.39	x	60.65	
5	Denise Passmore	Australia	57.33	x	59.10	x	57.76	55.88	59.10	
6	Caroline Fournier	Mauritius	56.01	x	58.42	59.02	x	57.39	59.02	
7	Lyn Sprules	England	58.32	x	x	57.83	59.01	57.75	59.01	
8	Michelle Fournier	Canada	57.78	x	56.59	56.88	56.43	x	57.78	
9	Patti Pilsner-Steinke	Canada	52.59	56.14	56.23				56.23	
10	Tasha Williams	New Zealand	56.21	x	56.05				56.21	
11	Rachael Beverley	England	55.34	54.58	54.64				55.34	
12	Sarah Louise Moore	Wales	x	47.79	x				47.79	
