= Athletics at the 1999 Pan American Games – Women's hammer throw =

Women's hammer throw at the Pan American Games

The final of the Women's Hammer Throw event at the 1999 Pan American Games took place on July 24, 1999. America's Dawn Ellerbe won the first ever Pan Am medal in the event since the women's hammer throw made its debut in Winnipeg, Manitoba, Kingdom of Canada

== Medalists ==
Gold	Dawn Ellerbe; United States
Silver	Yipsi Moreno; Cuba
Bronze	Caroline Wittrin; Canada

== Records ==
Standing records prior to the 1999 Pan American Games
World Record	Mihaela Melinte (ROM)	75.97 m	May 13, 1999	Clermont-Ferrand, France
Pan Am Record	New Event			

== Results ==
Rank	Athlete	Attempts						Result	Note
Rank	Athlete	1	2	3	4	5	6	Result	Note
1st place, gold medalist(s)	Dawn Ellerbe (USA)	63.66	61.74	61.86	63.01	54.97	65.36	65.36 m	GR
2nd place, silver medalist(s)	Yipsi Moreno (CUB)	60.65	x	61.67	61.14	63.03	61.51	63.03 m	
3rd place, bronze medalist(s)	Caroline Wittrin (CAN)	59.64	x	56.62	x	60.08	61.28	61.28 m	
4	Norbi Balantén (CUB)	x	59.05	x	57.96	60.46	x	60.46 m	
5	Michelle Fournier (CAN)	x	58.03	60.33	x	59.09	56.29	60.33 m	
6	Tamika Powell (USA)	x	x	53.05	58.90	57.24	57.87	58.90 m	
7	Nancy Guillén (ESA)	53.13	56.43	55.24	54.92	48.82	57.75	57.75 m	
8	Violeta Guzmán (MEX)	51.37	55.32	x	54.49	53.21	56.26	56.26 m	
9	Karina Moya (ARG)	x	51.91	49.87				51.91 m	
10	Claudia Becerril (MEX)	51.09	50.58	47.87				51.09 m	
	María Eugenia Villamizar (COL)							DNS	

== See also ==
- 1999 World Championships in Athletics – Women's hammer throw
- 1999 Hammer Throw Year Ranking
