= Athletics at the 2002 Commonwealth Games – Women's hammer throw =

Women's hammer throw at the Commonwealth Games

The women's hammer throw event at the 2002 Commonwealth Games was held on 26 July.

== Medalists ==
Gold	Silver	Bronze
Lorraine Shaw; England	Bronwyn Eagles; Australia	Karyne Di Marco; Australia

== Results ==
=== Qualification ===
Qualification: 63.00 m (Q) or at least 12 best (q) qualified for the final.

Rank	Athlete	Nationality	#1	#2	#3	Result	Notes
1	Lorraine Shaw	England	66.10			66.10	Q, SB
2	Tasha Williams	New Zealand	59.55	62.37	x	62.37	q
3	Karyne Di Marco	Australia	59.58	62.16	x	62.16	q
4	Candice Scott	Trinidad and Tobago	58.70	61.46	60.50	61.46	q
5	Michelle Fournier	Canada	60.26	59.08	x	60.26	q
6	Zoe Derham	England	54.62	x	60.22	60.22	q
7	Brooke Krueger	Australia	60.12	59.56	x	60.12	q
8	Caroline Fournier	Mauritius	58.58	59.09	59.91	59.91	q
9	Bronwyn Eagles	Australia	x	x	59.33	59.33	q
10	Jennifer Joyce	Canada	59.11	58.96	x	59.11	q
11	Suzanne Roberts	England	57.46	58.85	x	58.85	q, PB
12	Mhairi Walters	Scotland	x	52.66	56.03	56.03	q
13	Hardeep Kaur	India	55.98	55.39	55.52	55.98	
14	Lesley Brannan	Wales	55.90	51.93	51.16	55.90	
15	Natalie Grant	Jamaica	55.65	x	53.07	55.65	
16	Shirley Webb	Scotland	x	55.58	55.34	55.58	
17	Eleni Teloni	Cyprus	52.89	53.18	54.82	54.82	
18	Sarah Moore	Wales	x	51.43	50.44	51.43	
19	Laura Douglas	Wales	43.87	50.12	x	50.12	
20	Siniva Marsters	Cook Islands	x	40.40	39.45	40.40	

=== Final ===
Rank	Athlete	Nationality	#1	#2	#3	#4	#5	#6	Result	Notes
1st place, gold medalist(s)	Lorraine Shaw	England	64.51	x	66.83	63.84	x	x	66.83	GR
2nd place, silver medalist(s)	Bronwyn Eagles	Australia	63.76	x	65.24	x	x	x	65.24	
3rd place, bronze medalist(s)	Karyne Di Marco	Australia	x	62.69	59.73	61.45	63.40	60.16	63.40	
4	Brooke Krueger	Australia	62.39	62.74	63.13	60.52	60.45	61.48	63.13	
5	Candice Scott	Trinidad and Tobago	60.93	x	59.93	58.83	58.69	53.51	60.93	
6	Tasha Williams	New Zealand	59.77	59.41	x	58.40	60.43	59.78	60.43	
7	Jennifer Joyce	Canada	58.10	57.10	58.82	59.03	57.22	60.39	60.39	
8	Zoe Derham	England	58.71	59.57	58.94	x	x	59.38	59.57	
9	Suzanne Roberts	England	55.15	56.97	58.66				58.66	
10	Caroline Fournier	Mauritius	56.65	55.75	56.08				56.65	
11	Michelle Fournier	Canada	x	56.46	x				56.46	
12	Mhairi Walters	Scotland	54.09	52.75	x				54.09	
