= Charlton Rafaela =

Dutch Antillean sprinter

Personal information
- Born: 23 July 1977 (age 48) Willemstad, Netherlands Antilles

Sport
- Sport: Track and field

Charlton Rafaela (born 23 July 1977 in Willemstad) is an Antillean sprinter, who specializes in the 100 metres.

Rafaela is a former track and field athlete of the Interamerican University of Puerto Rico in San Germán. He graduated in physical Education at a secondary level and finished his master's degree in sports training and teaching in physical education.

Rafaela finished sixth in the 4 x 100 metres relay at the 2005 World Championships, together with teammates Geronimo Goeloe, Jairo Duzant and Churandy Martina.

== Achievements ==
Year	Competition	Venue	Position	Event	Notes
Representing the Netherlands Antilles
2002	Central American and Caribbean Games	San Salvador, El Salvador	7th	100m	10.49 w (wind: 2.1 m/s)
2002	Central American and Caribbean Games	San Salvador, El Salvador	5th (h)	200m	21.50 (wind: 0.4 m/s)
2002	Central American and Caribbean Games	San Salvador, El Salvador	6th	4 × 100 m relay	42.14
2004	South American U23 Championships	Barquisimeto, Venezuela	1st	4 × 100 m relay	39.18
