= Athletics at the 2002 Central American and Caribbean Games – Results =

These are the full results of the athletics competition at the 2002 Central American and Caribbean Games which took place between December 1 and December 6, 2002, at Estadio Jorge "Mágico" González in San Salvador, El Salvador.

== Men's results ==
=== 100 meters ===
Heat 1 - Wind: 2.5 m/s

Rank	Name	Nationality	Time	Notes
1	Jesús Carrión	Puerto Rico	10.37 w	Q
2	Yoel Báez	Dominican Republic	10.39 w	Q
3	Mario Rolando Blanco	Guatemala	10.42 w	q
4	Dion Rodriguez	Trinidad and Tobago	10.58 w	
5	Julio Felix	U.S. Virgin Islands	10.65 w	
6	Jorge Conde	Nicaragua	11.21 w	
7	Wladimir Afriani	Haiti	11.35 w	

Heat 2 - Wind: 2.5 m/s

Rank	Name	Nationality	Time	Notes
1	Juan Sainfleur	Dominican Republic	10.47 w	Q
2	Lerone Clarke	Jamaica	10.52 w	Q
3	Churandy Martina	Netherlands Antilles	10.54 w	q
4	Irvin Browne	Saint Kitts and Nevis	10.94 w	
5	Moroni Rubio	Mexico	11.02 w	
6	Lionel Rabel	Haiti	11.41 w	
-	Jorge Richardson	Puerto Rico	DQ	

Heat 3 - Wind: 1.3 m/s

Rank	Name	Nationality	Time	Notes
1	Charlton Rafaela	Netherlands Antilles	10.39	Q
2	Dion Crabbe	British Virgin Islands	10.48	Q
3	Everton Evelyn	Barbados	10.79	
4	Jorge Solórzano	Guatemala	10.79	
5	Delwayne Delaney	Saint Kitts and Nevis	10.85	
6	Oliver Lopez	Grenada	10.91	

Final – 2 December - Wind: 2.1 m/s

Rank	Name	Nationality	Time	Notes
1st place, gold medalist(s)	Dion Crabbe	British Virgin Islands	10.28 w	
2nd place, silver medalist(s)	Jesús Carrión	Puerto Rico	10.32 w	
3rd place, bronze medalist(s)	Mario Rolando Blanco	Guatemala	10.34 w	
4	Yoel Báez	Dominican Republic	10.46 w	
5	Juan Sainfleur	Dominican Republic	10.47 w	
6	Lerone Clarke	Jamaica	10.49 w	
7	Charlton Rafaela	Netherlands Antilles	10.49 w	
8	Churandy Martina	Netherlands Antilles	10.55 w	

=== 200 meters ===
Heat 1 - Wind: 1.6 m/s

Rank	Name	Nationality	Time	Notes
1	José Carabalí	Venezuela	21.23	Q
2	Churandy Martina	Netherlands Antilles	21.47	Q
3	Andrew Tynes	Bahamas	21.48	
4	Kenneth Telemaque	U.S. Virgin Islands	21.65	
5	Kevin Arthurton	Saint Kitts and Nevis	21.71	
6	Jorge Solórzano	Guatemala	21.77	
7	Hugh Reid	Barbados	22.08	
8	Oliver Saint-Aude	Haiti	22.80	

Heat 2 - Wind: 0.0 m/s

Rank	Name	Nationality	Time	Notes
1	Dion Crabbe	British Virgin Islands	21.04	Q
2	Hely Ollarves	Venezuela	21.07	Q
3	Jorge Richardson	Puerto Rico	21.16	q
4	Ainsley Waugh	Jamaica	21.22	
5	Larry Enote Inanga	Saint Kitts and Nevis	22.14	
6	Michael Charles	Dominica	22.52	
7	Jorge Conde	Nicaragua	22.89	

Heat 3 - Wind: 0.4 m/s

Rank	Name	Nationality	Time	Notes
1	Juan Pedro Toledo	Mexico	21.03	Q
2	Christopher Williams	Jamaica	21.11	Q
3	Mario Rolando Blanco	Guatemala	21.17	q
4	Osvaldo Nieves	Puerto Rico	21.49	
5	Charlton Rafaela	Netherlands Antilles	21.50	
6	Julio Felix	U.S. Virgin Islands	21.53	
7	Darvin Lopez	Grenada	22.75	

Final – 5 December - Wind: -0.4 m/s

Rank	Name	Nationality	Time	Notes
1st place, gold medalist(s)	Juan Pedro Toledo	Mexico	20.97	
2nd place, silver medalist(s)	Christopher Williams	Jamaica	21.04	
3rd place, bronze medalist(s)	José Carabalí	Venezuela	21.13	
4	Dion Crabbe	British Virgin Islands	21.15	
5	Jorge Richardson	Puerto Rico	21.21	
6	Hely Ollarves	Venezuela	21.29	
7	Mario Rolando Blanco	Guatemala	21.41	
8	Churandy Martina	Netherlands Antilles	21.89	

=== 400 meters ===
Heat 1

Rank	Name	Nationality	Time	Notes
1	Simon Pierre	Trinidad and Tobago	46.90	Q
2	Gerardo Peralta	Dominican Republic	47.25	Q
3	Eder Robles	Mexico	48.33	
4	Larry Enote Inanga	Saint Kitts and Nevis	48.77	
5	Kenneth Telemaque	U.S. Virgin Islands	48.82	
6	Andre Burton	Cayman Islands	52.53	

Heat 2

Rank	Name	Nationality	Time	Notes
1	William Hernández	Venezuela	47.23	Q
2	Lansford Spence	Jamaica	47.40	Q
3	Juan Pedro Toledo	Mexico	47.50	q
4	Geronimo Goeloe	Netherlands Antilles	48.32	q
5	Adrian Durant	U.S. Virgin Islands	49.04	
6	Erick García	El Salvador	53.18	

Heat 3

Rank	Name	Nationality	Time	Notes
1	Carlos Santa	Dominican Republic	46.57	Q
2	Luis Luna	Venezuela	47.50	Q
3	Hugh Reid	Barbados	48.90	
4	Michael Charles	Dominica	49.19	
5	Marcelo Figueroa	El Salvador	49.68	
6	Henry Lizama	Guatemala	50.00	

Final – 2 December

Rank	Name	Nationality	Time	Notes
1st place, gold medalist(s)	Carlos Santa	Dominican Republic	45.83	NR
2nd place, silver medalist(s)	Lansford Spence	Jamaica	46.31	
3rd place, bronze medalist(s)	Juan Pedro Toledo	Mexico	46.79	
4	Gerardo Peralta	Dominican Republic	47.01	
5	William Hernández	Venezuela	47.17	
6	Simon Pierre	Trinidad and Tobago	47.22	
7	Luis Luna	Venezuela	47.28	
8	Geronimo Goeloe	Netherlands Antilles	48.14	

=== 800 meters ===
Final – 5 December

Rank	Name	Nationality	Time	Notes
1st place, gold medalist(s)	José Manuel González	Venezuela	1:48.71	
2nd place, silver medalist(s)	Germaine Myers	Jamaica	1:48.89	
3rd place, bronze medalist(s)	Marvin Watts	Jamaica	1:49.11	
4	Jean Destine	Haiti	1:49.79	
5	Heleodoro Navarro	Mexico	1:50.37	
6	Ricardo Etheridge	Puerto Rico	1:50.40	
7	Isidro Pimentel	Dominican Republic	1:51.02	
8	Rodolfo Gómez	Mexico	1:51.56	
9	Jean Ignatius	Netherlands Antilles	1:55.23	
10	César Arias	El Salvador	1:55.44	

=== 1500 meters ===
Final – 2 December

Rank	Name	Nationality	Time	Notes
1st place, gold medalist(s)	Juan Luis Barrios	Mexico	3:43.71	
2nd place, silver medalist(s)	Alexander Greaux	Puerto Rico	3:45.75	
3rd place, bronze medalist(s)	Michael Tomlin	Jamaica	3:49.33	
4	Mauricio Ladino	Colombia	3:51.03	
5	Isidro Pimentel	Dominican Republic	3:51.78	
6	Emigdio Delgado	Venezuela	3:52.68	
7	Rodolfo Gómez	Mexico	3:53.31	
8	José Manuel González	Venezuela	3:56.37	
9	Ricardo Etheridge	Puerto Rico	3:56.96	
10	William Bohlke	U.S. Virgin Islands	3:58.93	
11	Kevin Webb	Jamaica	4:14.86	

=== 5000 meters ===
Final – 3 December

Rank	Name	Nationality	Time	Notes
1st place, gold medalist(s)	Pablo Olmedo	Mexico	14:07.82	
2nd place, silver medalist(s)	Freddy González	Venezuela	14:08.45	
3rd place, bronze medalist(s)	David Galván	Mexico	14:11.95	
4	William Naranjo	Colombia	14:13.69	
5	José Amado García	Guatemala	14:33.50	
6	Emigdio Delgado	Venezuela	14:43.38	
7	Mauricio Ladino	Colombia	14:45.62	
8	José Zayas	Dominican Republic	15:22.92	
9	William Bohlke	U.S. Virgin Islands	15:54.62	

=== 10,000 meters ===
Final – 1 December

Rank	Name	Nationality	Time	Notes
1st place, gold medalist(s)	Pablo Olmedo	Mexico	28:36.67	GR
2nd place, silver medalist(s)	Teodoro Vega	Mexico	28:42.86	
3rd place, bronze medalist(s)	William Naranjo	Colombia	29:12.13	
4	Diego Colorado	Colombia	29:46.03	
5	José Amado García	Guatemala	30:30.30	
6	Sergio de León	Guatemala	30:30.35	

=== Marathon ===
Final – 6 December

Rank	Name	Nationality	Time	Notes
1st place, gold medalist(s)	Procopio Franco	Mexico	2:17:38	
2nd place, silver medalist(s)	Luis Fonseca	Venezuela	2:20:13	
3rd place, bronze medalist(s)	Juan Carlos Cardona	Colombia	2:21:27	
4	Alfredo Arévalo	Guatemala	2:21:53	
5	Francisco Bautista	Mexico	2:28:09	
6	Rafael Yax	Guatemala	2:28:10	
	Jacinto Rodríguez	Puerto Rico	DNF	
	Rubén Maza	Venezuela	DNF	
	Leonso Jiménez	Colombia	DNS	

=== 110 meters hurdles ===
Final – 2 December - Wind: 2.6 m/s

Rank	Name	Nationality	Time	Notes
1st place, gold medalist(s)	Dudley Dorival	Haiti	13.82 w	
2nd place, silver medalist(s)	Paulo Villar	Colombia	13.94 w	
3rd place, bronze medalist(s)	Ricardo Melbourne	Jamaica	14.02 w	
4	Gabriel Burnett	Barbados	14.03 w	
5	Hugh Henry	Barbados	14.16 w	
6	Luis López	Mexico	14.58 w	
	Wagner Marseille	Haiti	DNS	

=== 400 meters hurdles ===
Final – 5 December

Rank	Name	Nationality	Time	Notes
1st place, gold medalist(s)	Óscar Juanz	Mexico	50.46	
2nd place, silver medalist(s)	Miguel García	Dominican Republic	51.05	
3rd place, bronze medalist(s)	José Carvajal	Mexico	51.62	
4	Ryan King	Barbados	51.68	
5	Damarius Cash	Bahamas	51.94	
6	Roberto Cortés	El Salvador	52.79	
7	Ronald Forbes	Cayman Islands	55.01	
8	Henry Lizama	Guatemala	55.99	

=== 3000 meters steeplechase ===
Final – 6 December

Rank	Name	Nationality	Time	Notes
1st place, gold medalist(s)	Alexander Greaux	Puerto Rico	8:42.39	
2nd place, silver medalist(s)	Salvador Miranda	Mexico	8:48.18	
3rd place, bronze medalist(s)	Néstor Nieves	Venezuela	8:53.56	
4	Gustavo Castillo	Mexico	8:56.22	
5	Erick Bonilla	El Salvador	9:27.86	

=== 4 × 100 meters relay ===
Heat 1

Rank	Nation	Time	Notes	
1	Netherlands Antilles		40.23	Q
2	Guatemala		40.65	Q
3	Barbados		41.24	Q
4	Haiti		42.51	q
-	Saint Kitts and Nevis		DQ	

Heat 2

Rank	Nation	Time	Notes	
1	Dominican Republic		39.70	Q
2	Puerto Rico		39.94	Q
3	Venezuela		40.27	Q
4	Trinidad and Tobago		40.51	q
-	Jamaica		DNF	

Final – 6 December

Rank	Nation	Competitors	Time	Notes
1st place, gold medalist(s)	Dominican Republic	Leonardo Matos; Juan Sainfleur; Luis Morillo; Yoel Báez	39.41	NR
2nd place, silver medalist(s)	Venezuela	Juan Morillo; José Carabalí; William Hernández; Hely Ollarves	39.87	
3rd place, bronze medalist(s)	Trinidad and Tobago	Alvin Henry; Shane Dyer; Andre Brown; Dion Rodriguez	40.08	
4	Guatemala	Mario Rolando Blanco; Álvaro Paiz; Óscar Meneses; Jorge Solórzano	40.84	
5	Barbados	Everton Evelyn; Hugh Henry; Hugh Reid; Gabriel Burnett	41.82	
6	Netherlands Antilles	Guiseppi Josephia; Geronimo Goeloe; Charlton Rafaela; Churandy Martina	42.14	
	Puerto Rico	Osvaldo Nieves; Jorge Richardson; Jesús Carrión; Rogelio Pizarro	DNF	
	Haiti		DNS?	

=== 4 × 400 meters relay ===
Final – 6 December

Rank	Nation	Competitors	Time	Notes
1st place, gold medalist(s)	Dominican Republic	Leonardo Matos; Gerardo Peralta; Carlos Santa; Felix Sánchez	3:04.15	NR
2nd place, silver medalist(s)	Jamaica	Germaine Myers; Michael McDonald; Michael Williams; Lansford Spence	3:05.40	
3rd place, bronze medalist(s)	Venezuela	Danny Núñez; Jonathan Palma; Luis Luna; William Hernández	3:05.71	
4	Mexico	Eder Robles; Óscar Juanz; Roberto Carvajal; Juan Pedro Toledo	3:09.64	
5	El Salvador	Marcelo Figueroa; Erick García; César Arias; Roberto Cortés	3:18.94	

=== 20 kilometers walk ===
Final – 1 December

Rank	Name	Nationality	Time	Notes
1st place, gold medalist(s)	Alejandro López	Mexico	1:26:32	
2nd place, silver medalist(s)	Luis Fernando García	Guatemala	1:27:51	
3rd place, bronze medalist(s)	Fredy Hernández	Colombia	1:28:48	
4	Salvador Mira	El Salvador	1:33:43	
	Julio René Martínez	Guatemala	DNF	
	Ricardo Reyes	El Salvador	DQ	
	Claudio Erasmo Vargas	Mexico	DQ	
	Rogelio Sánchez	Mexico	DNS	

=== High jump ===
Final – 6 December

Rank	Name	Nationality	Result	Notes
1st place, gold medalist(s)	Gerardo Martínez	Mexico	2.18	
2nd place, silver medalist(s)	Omar Camacho	Puerto Rico	2.15	
3rd place, bronze medalist(s)	Gilmar Mayo	Colombia	2.15	
4	Damon Thompson	Barbados	2.05	
5	Octavius Gillespie	Guatemala	2.05	
6	James Rolle	Bahamas	2.05	
7	Tulio Ernesto Quiroz	Honduras	1.95	
8	Alton Berry	Belize	1.90	
	Edgar Torres	Mexico	NM	
	Huguens Jean	Haiti	NM	

=== Pole vault ===
Final – 1 December

Rank	Name	Nationality	Result	Notes
1st place, gold medalist(s)	Dominic Johnson	Saint Lucia	5.41	GR
2nd place, silver medalist(s)	Jorge Tienda	Mexico	5.00	
3rd place, bronze medalist(s)	Óscar Hernández	El Salvador	4.70	NR
4	Jorge Solórzano	Guatemala	4.50	

=== Long jump ===
Final – 5 December

Rank	Name	Nationality	Result	Notes
1st place, gold medalist(s)	Sergio Sauceda	Mexico	7.48 (+1.2 m/s)	
2nd place, silver medalist(s)	José Mercedes	Dominican Republic	7.32 (+0.2 m/s)	
3rd place, bronze medalist(s)	Kevin Arthurton	Saint Kitts and Nevis	7.26 (+1.1 m/s)	
4	Wayne McSween	Grenada	7.10 (+0.1 m/s)	
5	Vicente Ríos	Mexico	6.82 (+0.4 m/s)	
6	Ralston Henry	British Virgin Islands	6.68 (+0.5 m/s)	
7	James Rolle	Bahamas	6.67 (+1.4 m/s)	

=== Triple jump ===
Final – 2 December

Rank	Name	Nationality	Result	Notes
1st place, gold medalist(s)	Alvin Rentería	Colombia	15.57 (-1.1 m/s)	
2nd place, silver medalist(s)	Jhonny Rodríguez	Venezuela	15.42 (-2.5 m/s)	
3rd place, bronze medalist(s)	Wayne McSween	Grenada	15.12 (-1.4 m/s)	
4	Gerardo Carrasco	Mexico	15.12 (-2.5 m/s)	
5	Álvaro Paiz	Guatemala	14.80 (-2.8 m/s)	
6	Nicholas Neufville	Jamaica	14.62 (-1.6 m/s)	
	Juan Carlos Nájera	Guatemala	NM	

=== Shot put ===
Final – 6 December

Rank	Name	Nationality	Result	Notes
1st place, gold medalist(s)	Yojer Medina	Venezuela	19.63	GR
2nd place, silver medalist(s)	Manuel Repollet	Puerto Rico	16.93	
3rd place, bronze medalist(s)	José Ventura	Dominican Republic	16.46	
4	Jason Morgan	Jamaica	16.06	
5	Expedi Peña	Dominican Republic	15.60	
6	Ivorn McKnee	Barbados	15.60	
7	Edson Monzón	Guatemala	15.28	
8	Daniel Ríos	Mexico	15.09	
9	Charles Walcott	Barbados	14.17	

=== Discus throw ===
Final – 1 December

Rank	Name	Nationality	Result	Notes
1st place, gold medalist(s)	Héctor Hurtado	Venezuela	55.43	
2nd place, silver medalist(s)	Alfredo Romero	Puerto Rico	52.87	
3rd place, bronze medalist(s)	Yojer Medina	Venezuela	51.98	
4	Expedi Peña	Dominican Republic	49.52	
5	Jason Morgan	Jamaica	48.26	
6	Herberth Rodríguez	El Salvador	47.85	
7	Ivorn McKnee	Barbados	47.81	
8	Jesús Sánchez	Mexico	45.79	
9	Paul Phillip	Grenada	42.79	
10	Luis Squires	Panama	42.52	
11	Cliff Williams	British Virgin Islands	42.38	
12	Edson Monzón	Guatemala	39.69	
13	Erick Rivas	El Salvador	39.07	

=== Hammer throw ===
Final – 3 December

Rank	Name	Nationality	Result	Notes
1st place, gold medalist(s)	Raúl Rivera	Guatemala	65.99	NR
2nd place, silver medalist(s)	Santos Vega	Puerto Rico	65.35	NR
3rd place, bronze medalist(s)	Aldo Bello	Venezuela	65.35	
4	Carlos Valencia	Mexico	59.88	
5	Vicente Franco	El Salvador	53.25	

=== Javelin throw ===
Final – 5 December

Rank	Name	Nationality	Result	Notes
1st place, gold medalist(s)	Manuel Fuenmayor	Venezuela	75.32	
2nd place, silver medalist(s)	Noraldo Palacios	Colombia	75.11	
3rd place, bronze medalist(s)	Ronald Noguera	Venezuela	74.91	
4	Javier Ugarte	Nicaragua	65.23	
5	Mike Modeste	Grenada	62.55	
6	Daniel Alonzo	Dominican Republic	62.54	
7	Octavius Gillespie	Guatemala	61.98	
8	Luiggy Llanos	Puerto Rico	61.32	
9	Manuel Nuila	El Salvador	56.93	
10	Henry Butler	Bahamas	55.10	
11	Gustavo Siller	Mexico	52.21	

== Women's results ==
=== 100 meters ===
Heat 1 - Wind: 1.3 m/s

Rank	Name	Nationality	Time	Notes
1	Heather Samuel	Antigua and Barbuda	11.68	Q
2	Melocia Clarke	Jamaica	11.70	Q
3	Norma González	Colombia	11.78	Q
4	Ruth Grajeda	Mexico	12.11	q
5	Aura Amaya	El Salvador	12.86	

Heat 2 - Wind: 1.1 m/s

Rank	Name	Nationality	Time	Notes
1	Liliana Allen	Mexico	11.61	Q
2	Melisa Murillo	Colombia	12.06	Q
3	Winsome Howell	Jamaica	12.12	Q
4	Nadine Faustin	Haiti	12.31	q
-	Marcela Navarro	El Salvador	DQ	

Final – 2 December - Wind: 2.3 m/s

Rank	Name	Nationality	Time	Notes
1st place, gold medalist(s)	Liliana Allen	Mexico	11.34 w	
2nd place, silver medalist(s)	Heather Samuel	Antigua and Barbuda	11.44 w	
3rd place, bronze medalist(s)	Melocia Clarke	Jamaica	11.57 w	
4	Norma González	Colombia	11.69 w	
5	Ruth Grajeda	Mexico	11.95 w	
6	Melisa Murillo	Colombia	12.04 w	
7	Winsome Howell	Jamaica	12.26 w	
8	Nadine Faustin	Haiti	12.38 w	

=== 200 meters ===
Heat 1 - Wind: 1.1 m/s

Rank	Name	Nationality	Time	Notes
1	Norma González	Colombia	23.82	Q
2	Liliana Allen	Mexico	23.97	Q
3	Heather Samuel	Antigua and Barbuda	24.35	Q
4	Jenice Daley	Jamaica	24.42	q
5	Tricia Flores	Belize	26.38	q

Heat 2 - Wind: 0.9 m/s

Rank	Name	Nationality	Time	Notes
1	Anita Edwards	Haiti	24.14	Q
2	Ruth Grajeda	Mexico	24.87	Q
3	Amada Martínez	El Salvador	25.52	Q
-	Melisa Murillo	Colombia	DNF	

Final – 5 December - Wind: 0.0 m/s

Rank	Name	Nationality	Time	Notes
1st place, gold medalist(s)	Liliana Allen	Mexico	23.34	
2nd place, silver medalist(s)	Norma González	Colombia	23.73	
3rd place, bronze medalist(s)	Heather Samuel	Antigua and Barbuda	24.13	
4	Anita Edwards	Haiti	24.54	
5	Jenice Daley	Jamaica	24.79	
6	Amada Martínez	El Salvador	25.66	
7	Tricia Flores	Belize	26.36	
	Ruth Grajeda	Mexico	DNS	

=== 400 meters ===
Heat 1

Rank	Name	Nationality	Time	Notes
1	Ana Guevara	Mexico	53.45	Q
2	Clara Hernández	Dominican Republic	54.53	Q
3	Ángela Alfonso	Venezuela	55.47	Q
4	Karla Hernández	El Salvador	58.13	

Heat 2

Rank	Name	Nationality	Time	Notes
1	Gabriela Medina	Mexico	54.15	Q
2	Eliana Pacheco	Venezuela	54.32	Q
3	Mirtha Brock	Colombia	54.80	q
4	Verónica Quijano	El Salvador	56.59	q
-	Lorena de la Rosa	Dominican Republic	DQ	Q, Doping^{†}

^{†}: Lorena de la Rosa from the Dominican Republic initially qualified for the final (53.85s), but was tested positive for nandrolone and disqualified.

Final – 2 December

Rank	Name	Nationality	Time	Notes
1st place, gold medalist(s)	Ana Guevara	Mexico	51.87	
2nd place, silver medalist(s)	Eliana Pacheco	Venezuela	53.18	
3rd place, bronze medalist(s)	Clara Hernández	Dominican Republic	53.81	
4	Gabriela Medina	Mexico	54.40	
5	Mirtha Brock	Colombia	55.02	
6	Ángela Alfonso	Venezuela	55.20	
	Verónica Quijano	El Salvador	DNF	
	Lorena de la Rosa	Dominican Republic	DQ	Doping^{†}

^{†}: Lorena de la Rosa from the Dominican Republic was initially 2nd (53.09s), but was tested positive for nandrolone and disqualified.

=== 800 meters ===
Final – 5 December

Rank	Name	Nationality	Time	Notes
1st place, gold medalist(s)	Letitia Vriesde	Suriname	2:04.50	
2nd place, silver medalist(s)	Lysaira del Valle	Puerto Rico	2:06.09	
3rd place, bronze medalist(s)	Gabriela Medina	Mexico	2:06.55	
4	Sandra Moya	Puerto Rico	2:06.72	
5	Yenny Mejías	Venezuela	2:07.06	
6	Ana Hurtado	Guatemala	2:11.03	
	Marie-Lyne Joseph	Dominica	DNS	

=== 1500 meters ===
Final – 6 December

Rank	Name	Nationality	Time	Notes
1st place, gold medalist(s)	Dulce María Rodríguez	Mexico	4:18.91	
2nd place, silver medalist(s)	Korene Hinds	Jamaica	4:22.03	
3rd place, bronze medalist(s)	Bertha Sánchez	Colombia	4:27.75	
4	Angélica Sánchez	Mexico	4:35.33	
5	Janill Williams	Antigua and Barbuda	4:39.26	
6	Dina Cruz	Guatemala	4:39.45	
7	Elsa Monterroso	Guatemala	4:39.48	
8	Elsa Campos	El Salvador	4:44.55	
9	Ruth David	U.S. Virgin Islands	5:21.85	

=== 5000 meters ===
Final – 5 December

Rank	Name	Nationality	Time	Notes
1st place, gold medalist(s)	Dulce María Rodríguez	Mexico	16:38.92	GR
2nd place, silver medalist(s)	Bertha Sánchez	Colombia	16:39.23	
3rd place, bronze medalist(s)	Nora Rocha	Mexico	16:42.18	
4	Elsa Monterroso	Guatemala	17:03.41	NR
5	Dina Cruz	Guatemala	17:35.23	
6	Elsa Campos	El Salvador	17:47.85	
7	Janill Williams	Antigua and Barbuda	19:20.29	
8	Ruth David	U.S. Virgin Islands	19:44.46	

=== Marathon ===
Final – 6 December

Rank	Name	Nationality	Time	Notes
1st place, gold medalist(s)	Isabel Orellana	Mexico	2:54:14	
2nd place, silver medalist(s)	Paola Cabrera	Mexico	2:56:05	
3rd place, bronze medalist(s)	Lourdes Cruz	Puerto Rico	2:59:46	
4	Margarita Conde	Guatemala	3:04:08	
5	Krisia García	El Salvador	3:04:49	
6	Myriam Pulido	Colombia	3:06:12	
7	Adelaide Carrington	Saint Vincent and the Grenadines	3:27:58	NR

=== 100 meters hurdles ===
Final – 3 December - Wind: 1.1 m/s

Rank	Name	Nationality	Time	Notes
1st place, gold medalist(s)	Dionne Rose-Henley	Jamaica	13.67	
2nd place, silver medalist(s)	Princesa Oliveros	Colombia	13.72	
3rd place, bronze medalist(s)	Nadine Faustin	Haiti	13.84	
4	Lucilia Contreras	Mexico	14.01	
5	Juana Castillo	Dominican Republic	14.96	
6	Laura Valldeperas	El Salvador	15.81	

=== 400 meters hurdles ===
Final – 5 December

Rank	Name	Nationality	Time	Notes
1st place, gold medalist(s)	Yvonne Harrison	Puerto Rico	57.39	NR
2nd place, silver medalist(s)	Yamelis Ortiz	Puerto Rico	57.52	
3rd place, bronze medalist(s)	Princesa Oliveros	Colombia	57.72	
4	Verónica Quijano	El Salvador	58.29	NR
5	Sheryl Morgan	Jamaica	58.66	
6	Lucilia Contreras	Mexico	59.73	
7	Yasmin Rodríguez	Dominican Republic	1:00.29	

=== 4 × 100 meters relay ===
Final – 6 December

Rank	Nation	Competitors	Time	Notes
1st place, gold medalist(s)	Colombia	Digna Murillo; Melisa Murillo; Mirtha Brock; Princesa Oliveros	45.34	
2nd place, silver medalist(s)	El Salvador	Marcela Navarro; Karla Hernández; Verónica Quijano; Aura Amaya	46.95	
3rd place, bronze medalist(s)	Jamaica	Melocia Clarke; Dionne Rose-Henley; Jenice Daley; Winsome Howell	50.62	
	Dominican Republic	Yelmi Martínez; Lorena de la Rosa; Claudia Rosa; Clara Hernández	DQ	Doping^{†}

^{†}: The relay team from the Dominican Republic was initially 1st (44.90s), but Lorena de la Rosa was tested positive for nandrolone, and the team was disqualified.

=== 4 × 400 meters relay ===
Final – 6 December

Rank	Nation	Competitors	Time	Notes
1st place, gold medalist(s)	Mexico	America Rangel; Magaly Yánez; Gabriela Medina; Ana Guevara	3:31.24	NR
2nd place, silver medalist(s)	Puerto Rico	Beatriz Cruz; Sandra Moya; Yamelis Ortiz; Militza Castro	3:35.94	
3rd place, bronze medalist(s)	Venezuela	Yusmelis García; Ángela Alfonso; Yenny Mejías; Eliana Pacheco	3:37.86	
4	Jamaica	Melocia Clarke; Winsome Howell; Korene Hinds; Sheryl Morgan	3:38.90	
5	El Salvador	Verónica Quijano; Ana Gabriela Quezada; Karla Hernández; Amada Martínez	3:48.24	NR
	Dominican Republic	Claudia Rosa; Yelmi Martínez; Lorena de la Rosa; Clara Hernández	DQ	Doping^{†}

^{†}: The relay team from the Dominican Republic was initially 2nd (3:32.88min), but Lorena de la Rosa was tested positive for nandrolone, and the team was disqualified.

=== 20 kilometers walk ===
Final – 1 December

Rank	Name	Nationality	Time	Notes
1st place, gold medalist(s)	Victoria Palacios	Mexico	1:36:16	GR
2nd place, silver medalist(s)	María del Rosario Sánchez	Mexico	1:36:44	
3rd place, bronze medalist(s)	Teresita Collado	Guatemala	1:42:07	
4	Sandra Zapata	Colombia	1:44:00	
	Ivis Martínez	El Salvador	DNF	
	María Guadalupe Sánchez	Mexico	DNS	

=== High jump ===
Final – 2 December

Rank	Name	Nationality	Result	Notes
1st place, gold medalist(s)	Juana Rosario Arrendel	Dominican Republic	1.97	GR
2nd place, silver medalist(s)	María Romary Rifka	Mexico	1.85	
3rd place, bronze medalist(s)	Caterine Ibargüen	Colombia	1.79	
4	Karen Beautle	Jamaica	1.79	
5	Lizeth Castillo	Mexico	1.70	
6	Gabriela Cuéllar	El Salvador	1.60	

=== Pole vault ===
Final – 3 December

Rank	Name	Nationality	Result	Notes
1st place, gold medalist(s)	Milena Agudelo	Colombia	3.90	GR
2nd place, silver medalist(s)	Alejandra Meza	Mexico	3.80	
3rd place, bronze medalist(s)	Andrea Zambrana	Puerto Rico	3.80	NR
4	Citlalli Huerta	Mexico	3.30	
5	Michelle Rivera	El Salvador	3.00	

=== Long jump ===
Final – 1 December

Rank	Name	Nationality	Result	Notes
1st place, gold medalist(s)	María Espencer	Dominican Republic	6.20 (-2.0 m/s)	
2nd place, silver medalist(s)	Yuridia Bustamante	Mexico	6.11 (-2.0 m/s)	
3rd place, bronze medalist(s)	Yesenia Rivera	Puerto Rico	6.03 (-2.9 m/s)	
4	Jennifer Arveláez	Venezuela	5.71 (-2.2 m/s)	
5	Nyota Peters	Guyana	5.63 (-2.2 m/s)	
6	Daphne Saunders	Bahamas	5.60 (-1.9 m/s)	
7	Tricia Flores	Belize	5.53 (-2.8 m/s)	
8	Juana Castillo	Dominican Republic	5.53 (-1.1 m/s)	
	Sabrina Asturias	Guatemala	NM	

=== Triple jump ===
Final – 6 December

Rank	Name	Nationality	Result	Notes
1st place, gold medalist(s)	María Espencer	Dominican Republic	13.57 (-2.5 m/s)	
2nd place, silver medalist(s)	Caterine Ibargüen	Colombia	13.17 (-1.4 m/s)	
3rd place, bronze medalist(s)	Jennifer Arveláez	Venezuela	13.10 (-1.0 m/s)	
4	María José Paiz	Guatemala	12.92 (-2.2 m/s)	
5	Paola Moncayo	Mexico	12.40 (-1.0 m/s)	
6	María Gabriela Carrillo	El Salvador	11.66 (-1.6 m/s)	

=== Shot put ===
Final – 2 December

Rank	Name	Nationality	Result	Notes
1st place, gold medalist(s)	Fior Vásquez	Dominican Republic	17.04	NR
2nd place, silver medalist(s)	Luz Dary Castro	Colombia	15.98	
3rd place, bronze medalist(s)	Isabella Charles	Dominica	12.84	
4	María Lourdes Ruiz	Nicaragua	9.95	
	Tamara Lechuga	Mexico	DNS	

=== Discus throw ===
Final – 6 December

Rank	Name	Nationality	Result	Notes
1st place, gold medalist(s)	Luz Dary Castro	Colombia	55.11	
2nd place, silver medalist(s)	Flor Acosta	Mexico	48.12	
3rd place, bronze medalist(s)	Ana Lucía Espinoza	Guatemala	46.61	
4	Fior Vásquez	Dominican Republic	39.98	
5	María Lourdes Ruiz	Nicaragua	36.64	
	Isabella Charles	Dominica	DNS	

=== Hammer throw ===
Final – 2 December

Rank	Name	Nationality	Result	Notes
1st place, gold medalist(s)	Amarilys Alméstica	Puerto Rico	60.39	NR
2nd place, silver medalist(s)	Violeta Guzmán	Mexico	58.48	
3rd place, bronze medalist(s)	Nancy Guillén	El Salvador	57.10	
4	María Eugenia Villamizar	Colombia	55.29	
5	Ana Lucía Espinoza	Guatemala	48.40	
	Jéssica Ponce de León	Mexico	DNS	

=== Javelin throw ===
Final – 3 December

Rank	Name	Nationality	Result	Notes
1st place, gold medalist(s)	Zuleima Araméndiz	Colombia	56.63	
2nd place, silver medalist(s)	Sabina Moya	Colombia	55.73	
3rd place, bronze medalist(s)	Nereida Ríos	Mexico	46.51	
4	Dalila Rugama	Nicaragua	44.91	
5	Karen Villafuerte	El Salvador	44.01	

=== Heptathlon ===
Final – 6 December

The highest mark recorded in each event is highlighted in yellow

Rank	Name	Nationality	100m H	HJ	SP	200m	LJ	JT	800m	Points	Notes
1st place, gold medalist(s)	Francia Manzanillo	Dominican Republic	14.61	1.57	10.03	25.05	5.63	40.83	2:18.09	5279	
2nd place, silver medalist(s)	Yudith Méndez	Dominican Republic	14.46	1.54	11.42	24.91	5.32	45.84	2:26.65	5261	
3rd place, bronze medalist(s)	Nyota Peters	Guyana	15.94	1.63	8.54	26.15	5.37	30.65	2:22.20	4657	
4	Laura Valldeperas	El Salvador	15.45	1.60	9.88	25.96	5.44	32.93	2:46.19	4561	
5	Beatriz Pompa	Mexico	15.83	1.57	8.45	26.93	5.00	31.96	2:24.28	4421	
6	María Gabriela Carrillo	El Salvador	16.02	1.66	8.60	27.23	6.18	33.87	2:46.81	4305	
