= Michelle Fournier =

Canadian hammer thrower

Personal information
- Born: May 9, 1977 (age 49) Edmundston, New Brunswick, Canada

Sport
- Sport: Track and field

Michelle Fournier (born May 9, 1977) is a retired female hammer thrower from Canada. Her personal best throw was 65.63 metres, achieved on July 22, 2000 in Lethbridge.

== Achievements ==
Year	Competition	Venue	Position	Event	Notes
Representing Canada and Quebec
1994	Jeux de la Francophonie	Bondoufle, France	8th	Shot put	12.56 m
1994	Jeux de la Francophonie	Bondoufle, France	12th	Discus throw	42.68 m
1998	Commonwealth Games	Kuala Lumpur, Malaysia	9th	Discus throw	45.49 m
1998	Commonwealth Games	Kuala Lumpur, Malaysia	8th	Hammer throw	57.78 m
1999	Universiade	Palma de Mallorca, Spain	15th (q)	Hammer throw	58.70 m
1999	Pan American Games	Winnipeg, Canada	5th	Hammer throw	60.33 m
2000	Olympic Games	Sydney, Australia	23rd (q)	Hammer throw	59.15 m
2002	Commonwealth Games	Manchester, United Kingdom	11th	Hammer throw	56.46 m
2004	NACAC U-23 Championships	Sherbrooke, Canada	3rd	Hammer throw	58.14 m
2005	Jeux de la Francophonie	Niamey, Niger	5th	Hammer throw	59.86 m
