= 1997 European Athletics U23 Championships – Women's hammer throw =

The women's hammer throw event at the 1997 European Athletics U23 Championships was held in Turku, Finland, on 10 and 12 July 1997.

== Medalists ==
Gold	Mihaela Melinte; Romania
Silver	Simone Mathes; Germany
Bronze	Lyn Sprules; Great Britain

== Results ==
=== Final ===
12 July

Rank	Name	Nationality	Attempts						Result	Notes
Rank	Name	Nationality	1	2	3	4	5	6	Result	Notes
1st place, gold medalist(s)	Mihaela Melinte	Romania	64.32	70.26	69.94	68.56	67.68	69.70	70.26	
2nd place, silver medalist(s)	Simone Mathes	Germany	58.90	64.38	60.72	60.40	x	63.18	64.38	
3rd place, bronze medalist(s)	Lyn Sprules	Great Britain	x	61.70	61.30	x	60.48	60.36	61.70	
4	Cristina Fechita	Romania	58.84	59.06	60.50	x	59.18	60.88	60.88	
5	Kirsten Münchow	Germany	x	58.86	x	58.00	x	58.10	58.86	
6	Veronika Ushakova	Russia	54.82	54.82	58.64	56.22	53.90	53.74	58.64	
7	Marina Savitskaya	Belarus	x	56.92	53.56	57.38	x	55.64	57.38	
8	Irina Kuznetsova	Russia	55.26	56.22	56.98	x	54.68	55.66	56.98	
9	Angélique Rondel	France	55.36	52.80	55.18				55.36	
10	Ester Balassini	Italy	55.12	54.94	54.44				55.12	
11	Irina Martynenko	Ukraine	54.28	54.70	54.30				54.70	
12	Agnieszka Pogroszewska	Poland	54.12	x	x				54.12	

=== Qualifications ===
10 July
Qualify: first to 12 to the Final

Rank	Name	Nationality	Result	Notes
1	Mihaela Melinte	Romania	64.84	Q
2	Lyn Sprules	Great Britain	60.04	Q
3	Simone Mathes	Germany	59.74	Q
4	Marina Savitskaya	Belarus	59.04	Q
5	Kirsten Münchow	Germany	56.64	Q
6	Irina Martynenko	Ukraine	56.18	Q
7	Veronika Ushakova	Russia	55.78	Q
8	Irina Kuznetsova	Russia	55.78	Q
9	Cristina Fechita	Romania	55.18	Q
10	Ester Balassini	Italy	54.72	Q
11	Agnieszka Pogroszewska	Poland	53.66	Q
12	Angélique Rondel	France	52.90	Q
13	Silvia Lazzari	Italy	52.72	
14	Dina Holden	Great Britain	52.56	
15	Jolanta Borawska	Poland	50.40	
16	Nicola Coffey	Ireland	49.84	
17	Birsen Elma	Turkey	49.22	
18	Olivia Kelleher	Ireland	48.86	

== Participation ==
According to an unofficial count, 18 athletes from 11 countries participated in the event.

- Belarus (1)
- France (1)
- Germany (2)
- Great Britain (2)
- Ireland (2)
- Italy (2)
- Poland (2)
- Romania (2)
- Russia (2)
- Turkey (1)
- Ukraine (1)
