= Karyne Di Marco =

Australian hammer thrower

Personal information
- Nationality: Australia
- Born: Perkins; 14 March 1978 (age 48) Whyalla, South Australia

Sport
- Sport: Athletics
- Retired: 2010

Achievements and titles
- Personal best: 67.44m
Medal record
Women's athletics
Representing Australia
Commonwealth Games
Bronze medal – third place	2002 Manchester	Hammer throw
Oceania Championships
Bronze medal – third place	2010 Cairns	Hammer throw
- Updated on 24 April 2013

Karyne Di Marco (née Perkins; born 14 March 1978) is an Australian female hammer thrower. Her personal best is 67.44 metres, achieved in March 2004 in Adelaide.

== Achievements ==
Year	Competition	Venue	Position	Event	Notes
Representing Australia
1998	Commonwealth Games	Kuala Lumpur, Malaysia	4th	Hammer throw	60.65 m
1999	Universiade	Palma de Mallorca, Spain	8th	Hammer throw	60.85 m
2000	Olympic Games	Sydney, Australia	21st	Hammer throw	59.49 m
2001	World Championships	Edmonton, Canada	26th	Hammer throw	59.80 m
2001	Goodwill Games	Brisbane, Australia	8th	Hammer throw	60.65 m
2001	IAAF Grand Prix Final	Melbourne, Australia	7th	Hammer throw	60.42 m
2002	Commonwealth Games	Manchester, United Kingdom	3rd	Hammer throw	63.40 m
2006	Commonwealth Games	Melbourne, Australia	4th	Hammer throw	62.23 m
2010	Oceania Championships	Cairns, Australia	3rd	Hammer throw	61.89 m
2010	Commonwealth Games	Delhi, India	6th	Hammer throw	62.38 m
