= Dawn Ellerbe =

American hammer thrower

Personal information
- Born: April 3, 1974 (age 52) Central Islip, New York, U.S.
- Years active: 1997–2003
Medal record
Representing United States
Pan American Games
Gold medal – first place	1999 Winnipeg	Hammer throw

Dawn L. Ellerbe (born April 3, 1974) is a former track and field athlete who specialized in the hammer throw. She is currently the assistant athletic director at California State University, Northridge and a popular fashion model and blogger. Ellerbe is a member of the University of South Carolina Athletics Hall of Fame and is on the Board of Directors for the United Way of the Midlands in Columbia, South Carolina.

Ellerbe was featured in the New York Times article, "Sports of The Times; At Sydney, the First Toss Goes to the Women" by George Vecsey. and by CNN Sports Illustrated, "Ellerbe leads U.S. in debut of hammer throw." Her interest in fashion was profiled in "My Way: Dawn Ellerbe" in skirt!Columbia.

During her time as a student athlete at the University of South Carolina, Ellerbe was a four-time NCAA champion, six-time All-American and five-time Southeastern Conference champion. After receiving her bachelor's degree in journalism from the University of South Carolina in 1996, Ellerbe continued competition.

Ellerbe is a six-time USA Indoor champion (1996–2001) and six-time USA Outdoor champion in the hammer throw (1995–2001). Ellerbe also claimed the gold medal at the 1999 Pan American Games in Winnipeg, Manitoba, Canada.

Then representing the United States in the 2000 Summer Olympics, Ellerbe finished in 7th place in the women's hammer throw competition with a distance of 66.80 metres.

== International competitions ==
Year	Competition	Venue	Position	Notes
Representing the United States
1997	Universiade	Catania, Italy	6th	61.52 m
1998	Goodwill Games	Uniondale, United States	6th	62.78 m
1999	Universiade	Palma de Mallorca, Spain	4th	67.52 m
1999	Pan American Games	Winnipeg, Manitoba, Canada	1st	65.36 m
1999	World Championships	Seville, Spain	10th	63.55 m
2000	Olympic Games	Sydney, Australia	7th	66.80 m
2001	World Championships	Edmonton, Canada	13th (q)	64.34 m
2001	Goodwill Games	Brisbane, Australia	7th	61.51 m
2003	Pan American Games	Santo Domingo, Dominican Republic	5th	65.75 m
2003	World Championships	Paris, France	29th (q)	61.66 m
