= Sergio Sauceda =

Mexican long jumper

Personal information
- Born: October 14, 1973 (age 52) Mazatlán, Mexico

Sport
- Sport: Track and field
Medal record
Representing Mexico
Central American and Caribbean Games
Gold medal – first place	2002 El Salvador	Long jump

Sergio Manuel Sauceda Raygoza (born October 14, 1973) is a male retired track and field athlete from Mexico, who competed in the men's long jump during his career. He had a personal best of 7.76 m in the long jump. He is also the co-author of the book Manufacturing 4.0 released in 2018. The book and its professional life is into the marge of new technologies and manufacturing process.

He started training in 1993 and after few months later he achieved 7.30 m in the long jump. In the 1995 season he began with a jump of 7.47 m and closed with a best of 7.76 m at the Memorial Barrientos event in Havana, Cuba. That same year, he was included in the Mexican team for the Central American and Caribbean Championships in Guatemala and the Summer Universiade in Fukuoka, Japan.

In 1996 while he was training for the Olympics qualifying rounds, he had to stop due to health problems. In 2000, he returned to the track and won the long jump at the Mexican national championships three times consecutively from 2000 to 2002. He won the long jump at the 2002 Central American and Caribbean Games in El Salvador. Sauceda retired in 2006.

== Achievements ==
Year	Competition	Venue	Position	Event	Notes
1995	Universiade	Fukuoka, Japan	30th	Long jump	7.35 m
1995	Memorial Barrientos	Havana, Cuba	4th	Long jump	7.76 m
2002	CAC Games	El Salvador, Salvador	1st	Long jump	7.48 m (wind: +1.2 m/s)

Other results

- 2004: Triton Invitational UCSD in San Diego, CA, USA, 3rd (7.21 m)
- 2003: Grand Prix International in Xalapa, Ver. Mexico, 1st (7.27 m)
- 2003: Grand Prix International in Guadalajara, Mexico, 2nd (7.53 m)
