= Carys Parry =

Welsh hammer thrower

Carys Parry (born 24 July 1981) is a Welsh hammer thrower.

Parry was born in Church Village, Rhondda Cynon Taf. She finished sixth at the 2006 Commonwealth Games in Melbourne with a personal best throw of 61.80 metres.

Her current personal best throw is 66.31 metres, achieved in June 2008 in Birmingham. This is a Welsh record and places Parry fourth amongst British hammer throwers, behind Commonwealth champions Lorraine Shaw and Shirley Webb, as well as Zoe Derham. She won the silver medal at the Commonwealth Games in Dehli.

Having missed out on qualification for the London 2012 Olympic Games, coming third in qualifiers to Sophie Hitchon, she later qualified for the 2014 Commonwealth Games in Glasgow.
