= 1996 Oceania Athletics Championships =

III Oceania Athletics Championships
- Dates: November 28–30
- Host city: Townsville, Australia
- Level: Senior
- Events: 42 (22 men, 20 women)
- Participation: 16 nations
- Records set: 13

The 1996 Oceania Athletics Championships were held in Townsville, Australia, between November 28–30, 1996.

A total of 42 events were contested, 22 by men and 20 by women.

== Medal summary ==
Medal winners were published. Complete results can be found as compiled by Bob Snow from Athletics PNG.

=== Men ===
Event	Gold		Silver		Bronze	
100 metres (wind: +1.7 m/s)	Toluta'u Koula; Tonga	10.56 CR	Justin Smith; Australia	10.61	Aminiasi Babitu; Fiji	10.82
200 metres (wind: +3.4 m/s)	Soloveni Nakaunicina; Fiji	21.54w	Laurence Jack; Vanuatu	22.02w	Aminiasi Babitu; Fiji	22.19w
400 metres	Bjorn Jansen; New Zealand	47.43	Soloveni Nakaunicina; Fiji	47.55	Baptiste Firiam; Vanuatu	48.97
800 metres	Mark Turner; New Zealand	1:53.61	Sebastine Sena; Papua New Guinea	1:54.49	Andrew Keane; Australia	1:55.67
1500 metres	Mark Turner; New Zealand	3:58.52	Mark McDonald; New Zealand	3:59.69	Sebastine Sena; Papua New Guinea	4:00.82
5000 metres	Isireli Naikelekelevesi; Fiji	15:54.65	Jonas Sumu; Vanuatu	16:10.76	Morris Manai; Papua New Guinea	16:17.81
10000 metres	Primo Higa; Solomon Islands	34:04.45	Isireli Naikelekelevesi; Fiji	35:27.94	Rendelius Germinaro; Federated States of Micronesia	38:24.32
Half Marathon	Charles Martel; Australia	1:14:18 CR	Primo Higa; Solomon Islands	1:15:28	/Georges Richmond; French Polynesia	1:16:54
3000 metres steeplechase	Primo Higa; Solomon Islands	9:41.87	Jonas Sumu; Vanuatu	9:48.30	Morris Manai; Papua New Guinea	9:48.31
110 metres hurdles (wind: +1.5 m/s)	Avele Tanielu; Samoa	15.15 CR	Graham Pether; Australia	15.37	Steven Heard; Australia	15.49
400 metres hurdles	Callum Stuart; New Zealand	53.74	Brendan Mallyon; Australia	55.24	Avele Tanielu; Samoa	67.51
High jump	Zane Dockray; Australia	2.07 CR	Hapo Maliaki; Papua New Guinea	1.99	Benetti Schwalger; Samoa	1.96
Pole vault	Lee Brown; Australia	4.20	Latu Tufunga; Tonga	4.20	Steven May; Australia	4.00
Long jump	Robert Tubaga; Vanuatu	6.99 (wind: +1.0 m/s)	Lee Brown; Australia	6.83 (wind: +1.1 m/s)	Colin Kerr; New Zealand	6.81 (wind: +0.5 m/s)
Triple jump	Clinton Joyce; Australia	15.20w (wind: +3.5 m/s)	Josh Ferguson; Australia	15.10w (wind: +3.5 m/s)	Avele Tanielu; Samoa	13.31w (wind: +5.1 m/s)
Shot put	Chris Gaviglio; Australia	15.92	Richard Thompson; New Zealand	15.89	Kevin Galea; Australia	15.17
Discus throw	Chris Boccalatte; Australia	49.90 CR	Patrick Hellier; New Zealand	49.90 CR	Chris Gaviglio; Australia	49.80
Hammer throw	Patrick Hellier; New Zealand	63.60 CR	Brentt Jones; Norfolk Island	52.10	Daniel Goulding; Australia	41.26
Javelin throw	Andrew Harrison; New Zealand	65.26	Ian Swarbrick; Australia	60.36	Blair Stewart; New Zealand	59.64
10 Kilometres Road Walk	Nick McDonald; New Zealand	51:17 CR	Dip Chand; Fiji	54:30		
4 x 100 metres relay	Fiji	42.36	Vanuatu	42.39	Australia	42.75
4 x 400 metres relay	Papua New Guinea	3:21.51	Vanuatu	3:22.34	Australia	3:22.38

=== Women ===
Event	Gold		Silver		Bronze	
100 metres (wind: +1.6 m/s)	Siulolo Liku; Tonga	12.26	Tasha Williams; New Zealand	12.27	Melissa Toigo; Australia	12.51
200 metres (wind: +2.6 m/s)	Renee Robson; Australia	24.51w	Anita Sutherland; New Zealand	25.13w	Rossa Maira; Papua New Guinea	25.40w
400 metres	Renee Robson; Australia	55.27 CR	Rossa Maira; Papua New Guinea	57.78	Rachael Savage; New Zealand	58.47
800 metres	Vasa Tulahe; Tonga	2:23.37				
1500 metres	Salome Tabuatalei; Fiji	4:52.05	Vasa Tulahe; Tonga	4:54.25	Sieni Skelton; American Samoa	5:51.48
5000 metres	Salome Tabuatalei; Fiji	19:17.56	Vasa Tulahe; Tonga	19:34.12		
Half Marathon	Marion Canute; Australia	1:21:43 CR	Monique Greenoff-Gaffney; Australia	1:43:07	Sieni Skelton; American Samoa	1:59:15
100 metres hurdles (wind: +2.6 m/s)	Siulolo Liku; Tonga	14.61w	Melina Hamilton; New Zealand	14.92w	Elaine Glen; Australia	15.88w
400 metres hurdles	Megan Minehane; Australia	65.15				
High jump	Belinda Lavarack; Australia	1.74	Vicki Collins; Australia	1.74		
Pole vault	Melina Hamilton; New Zealand	3.60 CR				
Long jump	Melissa Toigo; Australia	6.11 (wind: +1.8 m/s) CR	Siulolo Liku; Tonga	5.96 (wind: +1.3 m/s)	Anita Sutherland; New Zealand	5.79w (wind: +2.2 m/s)
Triple jump	Siulolo Liku; Tonga	12.29 (wind: +1.5 m/s)	Caryn Morris; Australia	11.91w (wind: +2.5 m/s)	Megan Minehane; Australia	11.61w (wind: +2.4 m/s)
Shot put	Raylene Bates; New Zealand	13.11	Maria Disolokai; Fiji	12.18	Joanne Morris; Australia	12.17
Discus throw	Raylene Bates; New Zealand	42.08	Maria Disolokai; Fiji	37.70	Helen Wallis; Australia	36.06
Hammer throw	Tasha Williams; New Zealand	53.24 CR	Raylene Bates; New Zealand	46.36	Sharyn Tennent; Australia	39.80
Javelin throw (old implement)	Hayley Wilson; New Zealand	45.68	Renee Jacobsen; New Zealand	40.86	Brooke Stevenson; Australia	38.50
10 Kilometres Road Walk	Angela Keogh; Norfolk Island	57:14				
4 x 100 metres relay	New Zealand	47.67	Australia	49.84		
4 x 400 metres relay	New Zealand	3:59.83	Australia	4:07.35		

== Medal table (unofficial) ==
* Host nation (Australia)

Rank	Nation	Gold	Silver	Bronze	Total
1	New Zealand (NZL)	14	8	4	26
2	Australia (AUS)*	12	11	15	38
3	Fiji (FIJ)	5	5	2	12
4	Tonga (TON)	5	4	0	9
5	Solomon Islands (SOL)	2	1	0	3
6	Vanuatu (VAN)	1	5	1	7
7	Papua New Guinea (PNG)	1	3	4	8
8	Norfolk Island (NFI)	1	1	0	2
9	Samoa (SAM)	1	0	3	4
10	American Samoa (ASA)	0	0	2	2
11	Federated States of Micronesia (FSM)	0	0	1	1
11	French Polynesia (TAH)	0	0	1	1
Totals (12 entries)		42	38	33	113

== Participation (unofficial) ==
The participation of athletes from 16 countries was reported by the Pacific Islands Athletics Statistics publication.

- American Samoa
- Australia
- Cook Islands
- Fiji
- Guam
- Federated States of Micronesia
- Nauru
- New Zealand
- Norfolk Island
- Northern Mariana Islands
- Papua New Guinea
- Samoa
- Solomon Islands
- (French Polynesia) /Tahiti
- Tonga
- Vanuatu
