= Nancy Guillén =

Salvadoran hammer thrower

Personal information
- Full name: Nancy Guillén López
- Born: October 14, 1976 (age 50)

Sport
- Country: El Salvador
- Sport: Women's Athletics
- Event: Hammer throw
Medal record
Women's Athletics
Representing El Salvador
Central American Games
Gold medal – first place	2001 Guatemala City	Hammer throw
- Updated on 31 August 2012

Nancy Margarita Guillén López (born October 14, 1976) is a retired female hammer thrower from El Salvador. She set her personal best throw (62.43 metres) on June 9, 2001 at a meet in San Salvador. This is the current Salvadorean record.

She attended Oklahoma State University in Stillwater, Oklahoma and Southern Methodist University in Dallas, Texas.

== Achievements ==
Year	Competition	Venue	Position	Event	Notes
Representing El Salvador
1997	Central American and Caribbean Championships	San Juan, Puerto Rico	2nd	Hammer	52.98 m
1998	Ibero-American Championships	Lisbon, Portugal	7th	Hammer	53.98 m
1998	Central American and Caribbean Games	Maracaibo, Venezuela	7th	Hammer	54.69 m
1999	Universiade	Palma de Mallorca, Spain	16th (q)	Hammer	58.61 m
1999	Central American and Caribbean Championships	Bridgetown, Barbados	1st	Hammer	57.84 m
1999	Pan American Games	Winnipeg, Canada	7th	Hammer	57.75 m
2000	NACAC U-25 Championships	Monterrey, Mexico	4th	Hammer	58.19m
2001	Central American and Caribbean Championships	Guatemala City, Guatemala	2nd	Hammer	58.24 m
2001	World Championships	Edmonton, Canada	31st (q)	Hammer	57.96 m
2001	Universiade	Beijing, PR China	16th	Hammer	59.30 m
2001	Central American Games	Guatemala City, Guatemala	1st	Hammer	55.99 m A GR
2002	Central American and Caribbean Games	San Salvador, El Salvador	3rd	Hammer	57.10 m
2003	Pan American Games	Santo Domingo, Dominican Republic	8th	Hammer	57.30 m
2004	Ibero-American Championships	Huelva, Spain	13th	Hammer	56.95 m
