= Tasha Williams (athlete) =

New Zealand athlete (born 1973)

- Full name: Tasha Aimee Williams
- Born: 31 July 1973 (age 53) Dunedin, New Zealand
- Height: 1.75 m (5 ft 9 in)
- Weight: 74 kg (163 lb)

Rugby union career
International career
Years	Team	Apps	(Points)
1994	New Zealand	1	(10)
National sevens team
Years	Team		Comps
1997	New Zealand		
Medal record
Women's athletics
Representing New Zealand
Oceania Championships
Gold medal – first place	1996 Townsville	Hammer throw
Silver medal – second place	1996 Townsville	100 m

Tasha Aimee Williams (born 31 July 1973 in Dunedin) is a retired athlete who has represented New Zealand in rugby union, athletics, bobsleigh, weightlifting and powerlifting. Her personal best throw in the hammer throw was 65.91 metres, achieved on 24 February 2001 in Hastings.

== Biography ==
Williams has represented New Zealand in rugby union, athletics, bobsleigh, weightlifting and powerlifting.

=== Rugby career ===
At the age of 17, she featured for the Black Ferns at RugbyFest 1990 on 28 August against a Russia XV's team. She made her international rugby union debut on 2 September 1994 against Australia at Sydney.

== Achievements ==
Year	Competition	Venue	Position	Event	Notes
Representing New Zealand
1996	Oceania Championships	Townsville	2nd	100 m	12.27 s (wind: +1.6 m/s)
1996	Oceania Championships	Townsville	1st	Hammer throw	53.24 m
1998	Commonwealth Games	Kuala Lumpur	10th	Hammer throw	56.21 m
1999	Universiade	Palma de Mallorca	17th (q)	Hammer throw	58.44 m
2000	Olympic Games	Sydney	17th (q)	Hammer throw	61.18 m
2001	World Championships	Edmonton	15th (q)	Hammer throw	63.83 m
2002	Commonwealth Games	Manchester	6th	Hammer throw	60.43 m

== See also ==
- New Zealand records in athletics
