= Kirsten Münchow =

German hammer thrower

Personal information
- Nationality: Germany
- Born: 21 January 1977 (age 49) Auetal, Niedersachsen, West Germany
- Height: 1.72 m (5 ft 8 in)
- Weight: 75 kg (165 lb)

Sport
- Country: Germany
- Sport: Women's athletics
- Event: Women's Hammer throw
- Club: LG Eintracht Frankfurt

Achievements and titles
- Personal best: 69.28 (2000)
Medal record
Women's athletics
Representing Germany
Olympic Games
Bronze medal – third place	2000 Sydney	Hammer
European Championships
Bronze medal – third place	1998 Budapest	Hammer

Kirsten Münchow (born 21 January 1977), known as Kirsten Klose from 2002 until 2007, is a German hammer thrower who won the Olympic bronze medal in 2000 with a personal best throw of 69.28 metres.

This result followed the bronze medal she won at the 1998 European Athletics Championships. Her personal best throw of 69.28 metres ranks her fifth among German hammer throwers, behind Betty Heidler, Susanne Keil, Kathrin Klaas and Andrea Bunjes.

Münchow was born in Auetal-Rehren, and first competed for TuS Eintracht Minden, but in 2000 she switched to LG Eintracht Frankfurt, coached by Michael Deyhle. In 2002, she married fellow hammer thrower Holger Klose and the couple had a son, Sören Klose. Münchow is a two-time national champion in the women's hammer throw (2000 and 2001).

Münchow divorced in 2007 and is known again by her maiden name.

== Achievements ==
Year	Competition	Venue	Position	Event	Notes
Representing Germany
1997	European U23 Championships	Turku, Finland	5th	Hammer	58.86 m
1998	European Championships	Budapest, Hungary	3rd	Hammer throw	65.61 m
1999	European U23 Championships	Gothenburg, Sweden	2nd	Hammer throw	63.68 m
1999	World Championships	Seville, Spain	8th	Hammer throw	64.03 m
2000	Olympic Games	Sydney, Australia	3rd	Hammer throw	69.28 m, NR
2001	World Championships	Edmonton, Canada	9th	Hammer throw	64.39 m
