= Unn Merete Jæger =

Norwegian athlete (born 1971)

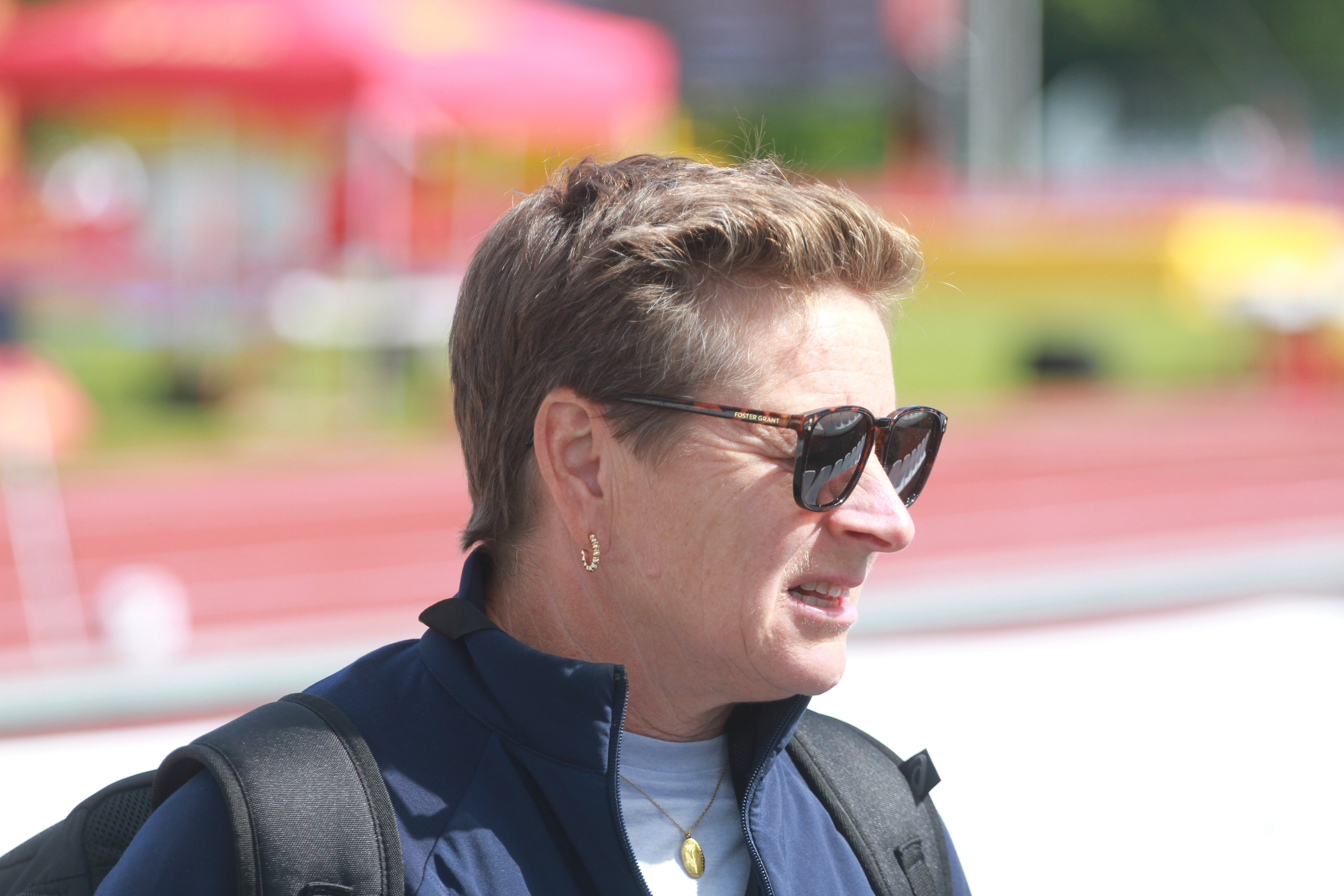
Jæger in July 2026.

Unn Merete Jæger, née Lie (born 18 January 1971) is a Norwegian athletics coach and former javelin thrower, hammer thrower and weightlifter. She won several Norwegian titles, competed at the European Championships in both athletics and weightlifting and held the Norwegian hammer throw record from 1997 to 2002.

== Athletics career ==
Hailing from Aremark, she represented the club Aremark IF before joining Halden IL in 1987.

In Norwegian javelin throw, Trine Hattestad enjoyed an almost two-decade long winning streak at the Norwegian Championships. Lie won two editions of the Norwegian Championships that took place without Hattestad, in 1990 and 1997. Lie also won the silver medal in 1991 and bronze medals in 1992, 1993, 1995, 1996 and 1999. She represented the clubs Halden IL, Aremark IF and SK Vidar. Her lifetime best was 51.94 metres with the old javelin type, achieved in June 1966 at Bislett stadion.

In the hammer throw, which was introduced as a women's event while Lie was active, she set a Norwegian record in May 1997, throwing 50.12 metres at Lisleby stadion. The old record belonged to Mette Bergmann. Lie broke her own record only three days later, then three times in 1998 and three times in 1999. Major incremental improvements include from 50.66 to 53.84 in May 1998, from 53.97 to 54.88 in July 1998, lastly followed by 56.86 in May 1999, 58.21 in May 1999, and 59.39 metres in July 1999 in Tampere. Lie finally lost her record in 2002 when Eva Danielsen became Norway's first 60-metre thrower. Her main goal was qualification to the 2000 Summer Olympics, in which she did not succeed.

Internationally, in the javelin throw she competed at the 1991 European Cup. In the hammer throw, she competed at the 1998 European Championships without reaching the final, as well as finishing seventh at both the 1997, 1998 and 2000 European Cups.

Lie also competed in weightlifting. Qualifying for the 1998 European Weightlifting Championships, she had to move from the 63 kg to the 69 kg weight class. She finished tenth in both the snatch, the clean and jerk as well as overall. All her lifts were Norwegian records: 72.5 kg in the snatch, 92.5 in the clean and jerk and 165 kg overall.

== Coaching career ==
Unn Merete Lie married fellow athlete Lars Martin Jæger in Aremark Church in June 2002.

Unn Merete Jæger rose to prominence as the coach of her own daughter, 400 metres specialist Henriette Jæger. In 2024 Unn Merete quit her civic job to coach full-time, with hundreds of travel days and appearances at the World Championships, Olympics and European Championships. The two was one of the very few mother–daughter coach–athlete duos on the highest level of athletics. In 2025, Unn Merete Jæger was nominated for Coach of the Year at Idrettsgallaen 2026. As Henriette Jæger was nominated for prizes too, they were the first mother–daughter duo in Idrettsgallaen's history to be concurrently nominated.

Unn Merete Jæger also coached her other daughter, Karoline. Karoline Jæger finished tenth in the triple jump at the 2017 European Youth Olympic Festival and competed at the 2018 European U18 Championships before becoming a police officer.
