= Jennifer Joyce =

Canadian hammer thrower (born 1980)

Personal information
- Born: September 25, 1980 (age 46) Vancouver, Canada

Sport
- Sport: Track and field
- Club: California Golden Bears
Medal record
Representing Canada
Commonwealth Games
Silver medal – second place	2006 Melbourne	Hammer throw

Jennifer Joyce (born September 25, 1980) is a Canadian hammer thrower.

While growing up outside of Vancouver, Joyce excelled in multiple sports as a child. In addition to athletics, she participated in soccer and volleyball, earning a spot on the British Columbia soccer provincial team in 1994. However, her greatest success came in hammer throw, in which she won three national junior titles from 1997 to 1999. As a freshman at the University of California, Berkeley, Joyce continued her success and set a Canadian junior national record of 58.90m. Through the course of her successful career as a Golden Bear, Joyce became a Pac-10 Champion and two NCAA All-American. She also was a four-time qualifier for the NCAA Championships, placing as high as fourth in 2000.

In 2003, her first year as a post-collegiate athlete, Joyce continued to train in California and won her first Canadian senior title. She successfully defended her title in 2004 and 2005 and earned a spot on the Canadian team for the 2005 World Championships. Joyce also set a national record of 68.48 meters that season. She then followed up her successful 2005 season with a silver medal at the 2006 Commonwealth Games.

In 2009, Joyce won her fourth national title and improved her personal best to 70.35m, becoming just the second Canadian to surpass 70 meters.

In addition to throwing, Joyce served as an assistant coach for the University of California's track and field team from 2003 until 2007. During her tenure, she coached several NCAA All-Americans and guided Kelechi Anyanwu to the first NCAA women's discus title in school history. She also coached Amin Nikfar to gold at the 2004 Asian Indoor Championships. Since 2008, she has lived in Kamloops, British Columbia, where she continues to train and also works as a personal trainer.

She sits on the Athletics Canada Board of Directors as an Athlete Representative since 2013.

== Achievements ==
Year	Competition	Venue	Position	Notes
Representing Canada
1998	World Junior Championships	Annecy, France	23rd (q)	50.07 m
2002	Commonwealth Games	Manchester, England	7th	60.39 m
2002	NACAC U-25 Championships	San Antonio, Texas, United States	3rd	58.61m
2003	Pan American Games	Santo Domingo, Dominican Republic	9th	55.51 m
2005	World Championships	Helsinki, Finland	20th	64.34 m
2006	Commonwealth Games	Melbourne, Australia	2nd	67.29 m
2009	World Championships	Berlin, Germany	23rd	67.07 m
