= Deborah Sosimenko =

Australian hammer thrower

Personal information
- Born: 5 April 1974 (age 52) Sydney, Australia

Sport
- Sport: Track and field
Medal record
Representing Australia
Commonwealth Games
Gold medal – first place	1998 Kuala Lumpur	Hammer throw
Summer Universiade
Bronze medal – third place	1997 Catania	Hammer throw

Deborah Anne "Debbie" Sosimenko (born 5 April 1974) is a retired female hammer thrower from Australia, who represented her native country at two consecutive Summer Olympics, starting in 2000. She won a total number of eight national titles during the 1990s and early 2000s.

== Achievements ==
Year	Competition	Venue	Position	Notes
Representing Australia
1997	Summer Universiade	Catania, Italy	3rd	65.02 m
1998	Goodwill Games	Uniondale, United States	4th	65.82 m
1998	Commonwealth Games	Kuala Lumpur, Malaysia	1st	66.56 m
1999	Summer Universiade	Palma de Mallorca, Spain	5th	62.88 m
1999	World Championships	Seville, Spain	5th	65.52 m
2000	Olympic Games	Sydney, Australia	5th	67.95 m
2004	Olympic Games	Athens, Greece	44th (q)	57.79 m
