= Caroline Wittrin =

Canadian hammer thrower

Personal information
- Born: December 10, 1968 (age 57) Vancouver, Canada

Sport
- Sport: Track and field
Medal record
Representing Canada
Commonwealth Games
Bronze medal – third place	1998 Kuala Lumpur	Hammer throw
Pan American Games
Bronze medal – third place	1999 Winnipeg	Hammer throw

Caroline Wittrin (born December 10, 1968) is a retired hammer thrower from Canada. She set her personal best throw (63.47 metres) on July 19, 1999 at a meet in Flagstaff, Arizona.

== Achievements ==
Year	Competition	Venue	Position	Notes
Representing Canada
1998	Commonwealth Games	Kuala Lumpur, Malaysia	3rd	61.67 m
1999	Pan American Games	Winnipeg, Canada	3rd	61.28 m
2001	Jeux de la Francophonie	Ottawa, Canada	5th	59.90 m
2001	World Championships	Edmonton, Canada	27th (q)	59.30 m
