= Cécile Lignot-Maubert =

French hammer thrower

Cécile Lignot
Personal information
- Nationality: French
- Born: 19 November 1971 (age 54) Bastia, France
- Years active: 1990s

Sport
- Event: Hammer throw

Cécile Lignot-Maubert (née Lignot; born 19 November 1971 in Bastia, Corsica) is a retired female hammer thrower from France. She set her personal best (65.39 metres) on 8 August 1999 at a meet in Castres.

She won the French female Hammer Throw Championships three times: in 1994, 1997 and 1999.

She set the French Hammer record four times, hurling respectively 58.60m, 59.74m and 63.88m in 1997, then 64.15m in 1998.

== Titles ==
- French Athletic Championships :
  - 3 times winner of female Hammer Throw in 1994, 1997 and 1999.

== Achievements ==
Year	Competition	Venue	Position	Notes
Representing France
1998	European Championships	Budapest, Hungary	22nd (q)	54.68 m
1999	Universiade	Palma de Mallorca, Spain	18th (q)	57.35 m
1999	World Championships	Seville, Spain	13th	62.14 m
