= 2002 African Championships in Athletics – Women's hammer throw =

The women's hammer throw event at the 2002 African Championships in Athletics was held in Radès, Tunisia on August 9.

== Results ==
Rank	Name	Nationality	Result	Notes
1st place, gold medalist(s)	Marwa Hussein	Egypt	61.64	CR
2nd place, silver medalist(s)	Caroline Fournier	Mauritius	58.39	
3rd place, bronze medalist(s)	Hayat El Ghazi	Morocco	58.27	
4	Mouna Dani	Morocco	55.07	
5	Ines Boujanfa	Tunisia	52.31	
6	Ramila Mindjou	Algeria	44.18	
7	Karia Mouhoubi	Algeria	43.72	
8	Nene Semega	Senegal	37.58	
9	Ramila El Meskaoui	Algeria	32.96	
	Darine Hajabi	Tunisia	NM	
