= Geronimo Goeloe =

Dutch Antillean sprinter

Personal information
- Nationality: kurasoleño
- Born: 18 November 1981 (age 44) Willemstad, Curaçao

Sport
- Sport: Running
- Events: 100 metres, 200 metres, 400 metres

Achievements and titles
- Personal bests: 100 m: 10.27 s (El Paso 2008); 200 m: 20.73 s (St George's 2004); 400 m: 46.53 (Bogotá 2005)
Medal record
Men's Athletics
Representing Netherlands Antilles
South American Championships
Bronze medal – third place	2005 Cali	200 m

Geronimo Goeloe (born 18 November 1981) is a sprinter, specializing in the 100 and 200 metres. He competed for the Netherlands Antilles until the dissolution of that country and now represents Aruba. He also holds the current national record, with a time of 10.42 seconds.

== Biography ==
Goeloe finished sixth in 4×100 metres relay at the 2005 World Championships, together with teammates Charlton Rafaela, Jairo Duzant and Churandy Martina.

On the individual level he won a bronze medal at the 2005 South American Championships. Participating in 200 m at the 2004 Summer Olympics, he was knocked out in the heats.

Goeloe is also a three times MVP of the LAI 2004-2005-2006 (Liga Inter Universitaria held in Puerto Rico). He won the 100 m and the 400 m for three consecutive years, the 200 m for two years in a row and finished third in the 200 m in his third year.

He has a bachelor's degree in physical education learning and teaching, and a master's degree in Education: ESL {English as a second language}

== Achievements ==
Year	Competition	Venue	Position	Event	Notes
Representing the Netherlands Antilles
2002	NACAC U-25 Championships	San Antonio, Texas, United States	8th	400m	47.55
2002	Central American and Caribbean Games	San Salvador, El Salvador	8th	400m	48.14
2002	Central American and Caribbean Games	San Salvador, El Salvador	6th	4 × 100 m relay	42.14
2004	South American U23 Championships	Barquisimeto, Venezuela	1st	4 × 100 m relay	39.18

bronze medal 200m at the 2005 South American Championships.
