= Manuela Priemer =

German hammer thrower

Manuela Priemer (born 19 November 1978 in Weiden in der Oberpfalz, Bavaria) is a retired female hammer thrower from Germany. She set her personal best (67.26 metres) on 4 June 2003 at a meet in Cottbus.

== Achievements ==
Year	Competition	Venue	Position	Notes
Representing Germany
1998	European Championships	Budapest, Hungary	10th	59.47 m
1999	European U23 Championships	Gothenburg, Sweden	3rd	62.36 m
1999	World Championships	Seville, Spain	15th	61.99 m
2002	European Championships	Munich, Germany	31st	59.30 m
