= Maria Tranchina =

Italian athletics competitor

Personal information
- Nationality: Italian
- Born: 10 February 1968 (age 58) Palermo
- Height: 1.75 m (5 ft 9 in)
- Weight: 75 kg (165 lb)

Sport
- Country: Italy
- Sport: Athletics
- Events: Shot put Hammer throw

Achievements and titles
- Personal bests: Shot Put: 17.04i (1995); Hammer throw: 61.41 m (1998)

Maria Tranchina (born 10 February 1968) is a former Italian female shot putter and hammer thrower, later became masters athlete. She won two gold medals at the 2007 World Masters Championships held in Riccione.

== Biography ==
She has won three national championships at senior level. Her personal best 17.04 m, set in 1995, ranked in the top 60 on the IAAF indoor world lists at the end of the season.

== Achievements ==
Masters

Year	Competition	Venue	Event	Position	Measure	Notes
2007	World Masters Championships	(Italy) Riccione	Hammer throw W35	1st	49.20 m	
2007	World Masters Championships	(Italy) Riccione	Weight throw W35	1st	15.66 m	NR
2007	World Masters Championships	(Italy) Riccione	Shot put W35	2nd	13.33 m	
2007	World Masters Championships	(Italy) Riccione	Pentathlon throw W35	2nd	3791 pts	

== Personal bests ==
- Shot put: 17.04 m ( (Italy) Schio, 16 February 1995)
- Hammer throw: 61.41 m ( (Italy) Formia, 17 May 1998)

== National titles ==
- Italian Athletics Championships
  - shot put: 1995
  - hammer throw: 1997
- Italian Winter Throwing Championships
  - hammer throw: 1996

== See also ==
- Italian all-time lists – shot put
