= Caroline Fournier =

Mauritian athlete (born 1975)

Personal information
- Born: 7 May 1975 (age 51)

Sport
- Sport: Track and field
Medal record
Representing Mauritius
African Championships
Gold medal – first place	1998 Dakar	Hammer throw
Gold medal – first place	2000 Algiers	Hammer throw
Silver medal – second place	1996 Yaoundé	Discus throw
Silver medal – second place	1998 Dakar	Discus throw
Silver medal – second place	2002 Radès	Hammer throw

Caroline Fournier (born 7 May 1975) is a retired Mauritian athlete who competed in the discus and hammer throw. She represented her country at the 2000 Summer Olympics in Sydney without reaching the final. She was a two-time African champion in the hammer throw and was also a gold medallist at the 1999 All-Africa Games. Fournier also was twice runner-up in the discus at the African Championships and once runner-up in the hammer.

She has personal bests of 51.54 metres in the discus and 62.06 metres in the hammer, both set in 1996. Both results are also standing Mauritian records.

== Competition record ==
Year	Competition	Venue	Position	Event	Notes
Representing Mauritius
1994	Jeux de la Francophonie	Bondoufle, France	14th	Discus throw	40.42 m
1994	World Junior Championships	Lisbon, Portugal	13th (q)	Discus throw	47.16 m
1995	World Championships	Gothenburg, Sweden	30th (q)	Discus throw	45.18 m
1995	All-Africa Games	Harare, Zimbabwe	3rd	Discus throw	45.12 m
1996	African Championships	Yaoundé, Cameroon	2nd	Discus throw	48.80 m
1997	Universiade	Catania, Italy	7th	Hammer throw	59.84 m
1998	African Championships	Dakar, Senegal	2nd	Discus throw	50.28 m
1998	African Championships	Dakar, Senegal	1st	Hammer throw	54.29 m
1998	Commonwealth Games	Manchester, United Kingdom	10th	Discus throw	45.13 m
1998	Commonwealth Games	Manchester, United Kingdom	8th	Hammer throw	59.02 m
1999	All-Africa Games	Johannesburg, South Africa	1st	Hammer throw	58.83 m
2000	African Championships	Algiers, Algeria	1st	Hammer throw	59.60 m
2000	Olympic Games	Sydney, Australia	25th (q)	Hammer throw	56.18 m
2001	Jeux de la Francophonie	Ottawa, Canada	7th	Hammer throw	54.09 m
2002	Commonwealth Games	Manchester, United Kingdom	10th	Hammer throw	56.65 m
2002	African Championships	Radès, Tunisia	2nd	Hammer throw	58.39 m
