= Simone Mathes =

German hammer thrower (born 1975)

Simone Mathes (born 13 March 1975 in Stadtsteinach, Bavaria) is a retired female hammer thrower from Germany. She set her personal best (67.97 metres) on 31 May 2004 at a meet in Fränkisch-Crumbach. Mathes also competed in the discus throw and the shot put. She is a five-time national champion in the women's hammer throw (1993, 1994, 1997, 1998, and 1999).

== Achievements ==
- All results in the women's hammer throw event

Year	Competition	Venue	Position	Notes
Representing Germany
1997	European U23 Championships	Turku, Finland	2nd	64.38 m
1998	European Championships	Budapest, Hungary	4th	64.05 m
1999	World Championships	Seville, Spain	7th	64.93 m
