= Violeta Guzmán =

Mexican hammer thrower (born 1977)

Personal information
- Born: 14 May 1977 (age 49) Mexico City, Mexico

Sport
- Sport: Track and field
Medal record
Representing Mexico
Central American and Caribbean Games
Silver medal – second place	2002 San Salvador	Hammer throw

Violeta Guzmán Magaña (born 14 May 1977) is a Mexican hammer thrower. She failed to qualify for the final at the 2004 Summer Olympics. Her personal best, from 2004, is 64.21 metres, a former national record. Her older brother, Guillermo Guzmán, was also a hammer thrower.

== Competition record ==
Year	Competition	Venue	Position	Event	Notes
Representing Mexico
1996	Ibero-American Championships	Medellín, Colombia	7th	Hammer	47.68 m
1996	Central American and Caribbean Junior Championships	San Salvador, El Salvador	1st	Hammer	51.46 m
1997	Central American and Caribbean Championships	San Juan, Puerto Rico	3rd	Hammer	52.70 m
1997	Universiade	Catania, Italy	18th (q)	Hammer	49.64 m
1998	Ibero-American Championships	Lisbon, Portugal	3rd	Hammer	56.92 m
1998	Central American and Caribbean Games	Maracaibo, Venezuela	4th	Hammer	56.09 m
1999	Central American and Caribbean Championships	Bridgetown, Barbados	2nd	Hammer	56.72 m
1999	Pan American Games	Winnipeg, Canada	8th	Hammer	56.26 m
2000	NACAC U25 Championships	Monterrey, Mexico	3rd	Hammer	58.84 m
2001	Central American and Caribbean Championships	Guatemala City, Guatemala	3rd	Hammer	54.92 m
2002	Central American and Caribbean Games	San Salvador, El Salvador	2nd	Hammer	58.48 m
2003	Central American and Caribbean Championships	St. George's, Grenada	1st	Hammer	55.72 m
2003	Pan American Games	Santo Domingo, Dom. Rep.	7th	Hammer	58.31 m
2003	Universiade	Daegu, South Korea	14th	Hammer	52.70 m
2004	Ibero-American Championships	Huelva, Spain	7th	Hammer	60.58 m
2004	Olympic Games	Athens, Greece	36th (q)	Hammer	62.76 m
