= Zoe Derham =

English hammer thrower

Personal information
- Nationality: British (English)
- Born: 24 November 1980 (age 44) Bristol, England
- Height: 178 cm (5 ft 10 in)
- Weight: 103 kg (227 lb)

Sport
- Sport: Athletics
- Event: hammer throw
- Club: Birchfield Harriers

Zoe Lianne Derham (born 24 November 1980) is an English hammer thrower who competed at the 2008 Summer Olympics.

== Biography ==
Derham competed at the European U23 Championships and during the same month finished third behind Lorraine Shaw in the hammer throw event at the 2001 AAA Championships.

Derham represented England at the 2002 Commonwealth Games in Manchester, finishing in eighth place in the hammer throw and four years later represented the England team again at the 2006 Commonwealth Games in Melbourne.

Derham became the British hammer throw champion after winning the British AAA Championships title at the 2007 British Athletics Championships.

Derham retained her British title an then at the 2008 Olympic Games in Beijing, Derham represented Great Britain. Her personal best throw is 68.63 metres, achieved in July 2008 in Loughborough. This places her fourth on the British all-time list, behind Lorraine Shaw, who is also her coach.

A third consecutive British title was won in 2009, in addition to appearing at the World Championships and the following year Derham won her fourth and last British title before participating in the Women's hammer throw event at the 2010 Commonwealth Games.

== International competitions ==
| Year | Competition | Venue | Position | Notes |
Representing Great Britain and England
| 1999 | European Junior Championships | Riga, Latvia | 20th (q) | 49.47 m |
| 2001 | European U23 Championships | Amsterdam, Netherlands | 22nd (q) | 55.53 m |
| 2002 | Commonwealth Games | Manchester, United Kingdom | 8th | 59.57 m |
| 2005 | World Student Games | İzmir, Turkey | 11th | 62.54 m |
| 2006 | Commonwealth Games | Melbourne, Australia | 5th | 61.92 m |
| 2006 | European Championships | Gothenburg, Sweden | 39th (q) | 56.94 m |
| 2007 | World Student Games | Bangkok, Thailand | 14th | 59.14 m |
| 2008 | Olympic Games | Beijing, China | 35th (q) | 64.74 m |
| 2009 | World Championships | Berlin, Germany | — | NM |
| 2010 | Commonwealth Games | Delhi, India | 3rd | 64.04 m |
