= Mihaela Melinte =

Romanian hammer thrower

Personal information
- Full name: Mihaela Melinte
- Nationality: Romanian
- Born: March 27, 1975 (age 51) Bacău, Romania
- Height: 1.70 m (5 ft 7 in)
- Weight: 84 kg (185 lb)

Sport
- Country: Romania
- Sport: Athletics
- Event: Hammer throw

Achievements and titles
- Personal best: 76.07 m (1999)
Medal record
Women's Athletics
Representing Romania
World Championships
Gold medal – first place	1999 Seville	Hammer throw
European Championships
Gold medal – first place	1998 Budapest	Hammer throw
Summer Universiade
Gold medal – first place	1997 Catania	Hammer throw
Gold medal – first place	1999 Palma de Mallorca	Hammer throw

Mihaela Melinte (born 27 March 1975) is a Romanian hammer thrower. She holds the world junior record, and with 76.07 metres she held the world record until Tatyana Lysenko beat it in July 2005. The twelve-time Romanian national champion, Melinte is also a former European and World champion, but has never participated in the Olympics.

She failed a drugs test at the Notturna di Milano meeting in 2000 (ruling her out of the 2000 Sydney Olympics) and she was banned from the sport for two years for taking nandrolone (an anabolic steroid). Following her ban, she never again reached a major global podium or threw over 72 metres – some way off her previous world record mark.

She took second place in the women's hammer at the 2005 European Cup Winter Throwing, but was less successful at the 2006 edition, where she finished eleventh overall. She finished fourth in both the 2007 and 2008 European Cup Winter Throwing events. She was the bronze medallist at the 2005 Jeux de la Francophonie.

== Achievements ==
Year	Competition	Venue	Position	Notes
Representing Romania
1997	Summer Universiade	Catania, Italy	1st	69.84 m
1997	European U23 Championships	Turku, Finland	1st	70.26 m
1998	Goodwill Games	New York, United States	1st	72.64 m
1998	European Championships	Budapest, Hungary	1st	71.17 m
1999	Summer Universiade	Palma de Mallorca, Spain	1st	74.24 m
1999	World Championships	Sevilla, Spain	1st	75.20 m
2003	World Championships	Paris, France	6th	68.69 m
2003	World Athletics Final	Szombathely, Hungary	3rd	69.27 m
2005	World Championships	Helsinki, Finland	11th	64.31 m
2005	Jeux de la Francophonie	Niamey, Niger	3rd	61.96 m
2006	European Championships	Gothenburg, Sweden	20th	63.96 m
2007	World Championships	Osaka, Japan	33rd	62.40 m

== See also ==
- List of doping cases in athletics

Records
Preceded by (Belarus) Svetlana Sudak	Women's Hammer World Record Holder; 4 March 1995 – 5 June 1995	Succeeded by (Russia) Olga Kuzenkova
Preceded by (Russia) Olga Kuzenkova	Women's Hammer World Record Holder; 3 March 1997 – 11 June 1997	Succeeded by (Russia) Olga Kuzenkova
Preceded by (Russia) Olga Kuzenkova	Women's Hammer World Record Holder; 13 May 1999 – 15 July 2005	Succeeded by (Russia) Tatyana Lysenko
