= Tatyana Konstantinova (hammer thrower) =

Russian hammer thrower

Tatyana Konstantinova (Russian: Татьяна Константинова; born November 8, 1970, in Pechersk, Kyiv) is a retired female hammer thrower from Russia. Her personal best throw was 72.09 metres, achieved on June 4, 1999, in Moscow.

== Achievements ==
Year	Competition	Venue	Position	Notes
Representing Russia
1998	European Championships	Budapest, Hungary	16th	58.35 m
1999	World Championships	Seville, Spain	11th	62.52 m
2000	Olympic Games	Sydney, Australia	15th	61.48 m
