= Sviatlana Sudak =

Belarus-born Turkish hammer thrower

Personal information
- Nationality: Turkish
- Born: 20 March 1971 (age 55) Grodno, Byelorussian SSR, Soviet Union

Sport
- Country: Belarus Turkey
- Sport: Athletics
- Event: Hammer throw
- Club: Enkaspor

Achievements and titles
- Personal best: 70.74 m (2008)

Sviatlana Sudak (Belarusian: Сьвятлана Судак; born 20 March 1971) is a Turkish female hammer thrower of Belarusian origin. She was born in Grodno, Belarus.

== Career ==
=== Belarus ===
On 5 June 1994, she set a new world record with 67.34 metres. Unfortunately, this happened before the IAAF recognized world records in hammer throw for women, so when Mihaela Melinte threw 66.86 metres on 4 March 1995 she set the first official world record. In June the same year Olga Kuzenkova improved it to 68.14 metres. Sudak later improved her personal best to 69.80 metres, well behind Tatyana Lysenko who had set a new world record of 77.06 metres a week earlier.

In competitions, she finished fifth at the 1997 Summer Universiade, ninth at the 1998 European Championships, ninth at the 1999 World Championships and tenth at the 2000 Olympic Games. She also competed at the 2003 World Championships and the 2004 Olympic Games without reaching the final round.

=== Turkey ===
She then became a citizen of Turkey. She competed at the 2007 World Championships and the 2008 Olympic Games without reaching the finals. Her personal best throw was improved to 70.74 metres, in July 2008 in Minsk.
