= Shirley Webb =

British hammer thrower

Shirley Addison née Webb
Personal information
- Nationality: British (English/Scottish)
- Born: 28 September 1981 (age 44) Whitley Bay, Tyne & Wear, England
- Height: 176 cm (5 ft 9 in)
- Weight: 90 kg (198 lb)

Sport
- Sport: Athletics
- Event: hammer throw
- Club: City of Edinburgh AC

Shirley Catherine Addison (née Webb) (born 28 September 1981) is an English born former hammer thrower who represented Scotland. She performed in the Gladiators series as Battleaxe.

== Biography ==
She was born in Whitley Bay, Tyne & Wear, England, and is the daughter of Andrew Webb, a Scottish international hurdler who competed at the Commonwealth Games. She attended The King's School, Tynemouth and graduated from the University of Edinburgh with a degree in Mathematics.

Webb represented the Scotland team at the 2002 Commonwealth Games in Manchester, finishing 16th in the hammer throw event. The following year Webb, finished second behind Lorraine Shaw at the 2003 AAA Championships and produced the same result at the 2004 AAA Championships.

At the 2004 Olympic Games in Athens, Webb represented Great Britain.

In 2005, she won the European Cup for Great Britain. This was the same year that she became the British hammer throw champion after winning the British AAA Championships title at the 2005 AAA Championships. She represented the Scotland team again at the 2006 Commonwealth Games in Melbourne.

Her personal best throw is 67.58 m (221 ft 8 1/2 in) which is the Scottish record, and places her fifth on the British outdoor all-time list.

Webb became a patron of Meningitis UK after suffering from viral meningitis.

== International competitions ==
Year	Competition	Venue	Position	Notes
Representing Great Britain and Scotland
2002	Commonwealth Games	Manchester, United Kingdom	16th (q)	55.58 m
2003	European U23 Championships	Bydgoszcz, Poland	11th	59.81 m
2003	Universiade	Daegu, South Korea	8th	61.07 m
2004	Olympic Games	Athens, Greece	41st (q)	61.60 m
2005	World Championships	Helsinki, Finland	23rd (q)	64.16 m
2006	Commonwealth Games	Melbourne, Australia	10th	59.31 m
2006	European Championships	Gothenburg, Sweden	34th (q)	60.30 m
