= Lorraine Shaw =

English hammer thrower

Personal information
- Nationality: British (English)
- Born: 2 April 1968 (age 58) Gloucester, Gloucestershire, England
- Height: 171 cm (5 ft 7 in)
- Weight: 91 kg (201 lb)

Sport
- Sport: Athletics
- Event: hammer throw
- Club: Sale Harriers Manchester
Medal record
Athletics
Representing England
Commonwealth Games
Silver medal – second place	1998 Kuala Lumpur	hammer
Gold medal – first place	2002 Manchester	hammer
Bronze medal – third place	2006 Melbourne	hammer

Lorraine Amanda Shaw (born 2 April 1968) is an English hammer thrower who competed at two Olympic Games.

== Biography ==
Shaw's personal best throw, and the previous British record, is 68.93 metres, achieved in June 2003 in Loughborough. She competed at four consecutive Commonwealth Games; starting in 1994 when she represented England in the hammer throw event, at the 1994 Commonwealth Games in Victoria, Canada. Four years later she represented England and won a silver medal, at the 1998 Commonwealth Games in Kuala Lumpur, Malaysia. This was followed by a gold medal at the 2002 Commonwealth Games in Manchester and a bronze medal at the 2006 Commonwealth Games.

Domestically, Shaw won seven AAA hammer throw titles in 1994, 1998, 2000, 2001, 2002, 2003 and 2004.

== International competitions ==
Year	Competition	Venue	Position	Event	Notes
Representing Great Britain and England
1994	Commonwealth Games	Victoria, Canada	10th	Discus throw	50.50 m
1998	Commonwealth Games	Kuala Lumpur, Malaysia	2nd	Hammer throw	62.66 m
1998	European Championships	Budapest, Hungary	11th	Hammer throw	58.19 m
1999	World Championships	Seville, Spain	14th	Hammer throw	62.09 m
2000	Olympic Games	Sydney, Australia	9th	Hammer throw	64.27 m
2001	World Championships	Edmonton, Canada	6th	Hammer throw	65.89 m
2002	Commonwealth Games	Manchester, United Kingdom	1st	Hammer throw	66.83 m
2002	European Championships	Munich, Germany	20th (q)	Hammer throw	61.50 m
2003	World Championships	Paris, France	10th	Hammer throw	65.95 m
2004	Olympic Games	Athens, Greece	30th (q)	Hammer throw	64.79 m
2006	Commonwealth Games	Melbourne, Australia	3rd	Hammer throw	66.00 m
